= Van der Graaf Generator discography =

- Studio albums: 13
- Live albums: 9
- Compilation albums: 8
- Singles: 7
- Video albums: 4

This discography covers the work of the English band Van der Graaf Generator.

== Albums ==
=== Studio albums ===
Year	Album details	Peak chart positions			
Year	Album details	UK	GER	NLD	ITA
1969	The Aerosol Grey Machine: Release date: September 1969; Label: Mercury/Fontana	—	—	—	—
1970	The Least We Can Do Is Wave to Each Other: Release date: February 1970; Label: Charisma/Probe	47	—	—	15
1970	H to He, Who Am the Only One: Release date: December 1970; Label: Charisma/Dunhill	—	—	—	—
1971	Pawn Hearts: Release date: 12 November 1971; Label: Charisma	—	—	—	12
1975	Godbluff: Release date: October 1975; Label: Charisma/Mercury	—	—	—	—
1976	Still Life: Release date: 16 April 1976; Label: Charisma/Mercury	—	—	—	—
1976	World Record: Release date: October 1976; Label: Charisma/Mercury	—	—	—	—
1977	The Quiet Zone/The Pleasure Dome: Release date: 2 September 1977; Label: Charisma/Mercury	—	—	—	—
2005	Present: Release date: 25 April 2005; Label: Charisma	103	100	—	34
2008	Trisector: Release date: 17 March 2008; Label: Virgin/EMI	—	—	—	83
2011	A Grounding in Numbers: Release date: 14 March 2011; Label: Esoteric	—	—	81	—
2012	ALT: Release date: 25 June 2012; Label: Esoteric	—	—	—	—
2016	Do Not Disturb: Release date: 30 September 2016; Label: Esoteric	88	—	96	48

=== Live albums ===
Year	Album details
1978	Vital: Release date: 14 July 1978; Label: Charisma/PVC
1994	Maida Vale: Release date: 13 June 1994; Label: Band of Joy
2007	Real Time: Release date: 5 March 2007; Label: Fie!
2009	Live at the Paradiso: Release date: June 2009; Label: Voiceprint
2012	Live at Metropolis Studios 2010: Release date: June 2012; Label: Salvo; With DVD live from 18 December 2010
2015	Merlin Atmos: Release date: February 2015; Label: Esoteric Antenna
2015	After the Flood: At the BBC 1968-1977: Release date: April 2015; Label:
2018	Live at Rockpalast – Leverkusen 2005: Release date: May 2018; Label: Mig Music; With DVD live from 5 November 2005
2023	The Bath Forum Concert: Label: Esoteric Antenna; Box set of 2 CDs + DVD + BluRay; Recorded 1 March 2022

=== Compilation and demo albums ===
Year	Album details
1972	68–71: Release date: August 1972; Label: Charisma
1980	Repeat Performance: Release date: 5 September 1980; Label: Charisma
1982	Time Vaults: Release date: 1982; Label: Sofa Sound
1987	First Generation (Scenes from 1969 to 1971): Release date: February 1987; Label: Virgin
1987	Second Generation (Scenes from 1975 to 1977): Release date: February 1987; Label: Virgin
1993	I Prophesy Disaster: Release date: 31 August 1993; Label: Virgin
2000	An Introduction: From The Least to The Quiet Zone: Release date: November 2000; Label: Virgin
2000	The Box: Release date: November 2000; Label: Virgin
2021	The Charisma Years 1970–1978: Release date: 3 September 2021; Label: Universal Music

== Singles ==
UK releases, except where noted.

Year	Single	Release date	Album
1969	"People You Were Going To" / "Firebrand"	17 January 1969 (Note: This single was withdrawn shortly after release)	non-album single
1969	"Afterwards" / "Necromancer"	December 1969 (Note: released in US)	The Aerosol Grey Machine
1970	"Refugees" / "The Boat of a Million Years"	24 April 1970	The Least We Can Do Is Wave to Each Other
1972	"Theme One" / "W"	18 February 1972 (Note: also released in various EU and Australia)	non-album single
1976	"Wondering" / "Meurglys III" (excerpt)	October 1976	World Record
1977	"Cat's Eye" / "Ship of Fools"	September 1977 (Note: released in France)	The Quiet Zone/The Pleasure Dome
2011	"Highly strung" / "Elsewhere"	April 2011 (Note: Record Store Day release)	A Grounding in Numbers

== Videos ==
Year	Video details	Notes
2003	Masters from the Vaults: Release date: February 2003; Label: Intense Gmbh	Belgian TV session, March 1972, incorrectly labelled as 1971
2003	Godbluff Live 1975: Release date: July 2003; Label: Classic Rock	Live in Charleroi 1975 + the same Belgian session
2005	Inside VdGG: Release date: June 2005; Label: Classic Rock	Includes the two mentioned above + Beat Club 1970
2009	Live at the Paradiso: Release date: June 2009; Label: Voiceprint	Live at Paradiso, Amsterdam, 14 April 2007
