= Real Time (Van der Graaf Generator album) =

Real Time: Royal Festival Hall, London, 06.05.05

Live album by Van der Graaf Generator
- Released: 5 March 2007
- Recorded: 6 May 2005
- Venue: Royal Festival Hall (London)
- Genre: Progressive rock
- Length: 128:46
- Label: Fie! Records
- Producer: Van der Graaf Generator

Van der Graaf Generator chronology
Present (2005)	Real Time: Royal Festival Hall, London, 06.05.05 (2007)	Trisector (2008)

Professional ratings
Review scores
Source	Rating
AllMusic	4/5 stars

Real Time: Royal Festival Hall, London, 06.05.05 is a live album by Van der Graaf Generator, released in 2007 on Fie! Records (the label owned by the group's singer and principal songwriter Peter Hammill). It contains the entire recording of the group's reunion concert at the Royal Festival Hall in London, England, on 6 May 2005. The album includes at least one song from every album released between 1970 and 1976, plus their 2005 reunion album Present. Nothing is included from 1969's Aerosol Grey Machine and The Quiet Zone/The Pleasure Dome, released in 1977 after Hugh Banton and David Jackson left the group. The album also contains "(In the) Black Room", a song performed live by Van der Graaf Generator in 1972 (a rehearsal recording was released on the collection Time Vaults); following the band's August 1972 breakup, it was released on Peter Hammill's 1973 solo album Chameleon in the Shadow of the Night, with Banton, Evans and Jackson all performing on the track.

The Japanese release of the album includes a bonus disc of three songs recorded live at the reunion tour that followed the Royal Festival Hall concert, plus one track of improvisation recorded while the group were soundchecking ("Gibberish").

== Track listing ==
Disc one
No.	Title	Writer(s)	Studio release	Length
1.	"The Undercover Man"	Peter Hammill	Godbluff (1975)	8:29
2.	"Scorched Earth"	Hammill, David Jackson	Godbluff (1975)	10:05
3.	"Refugees"	Hammill	The Least We Can Do Is Wave to Each Other (1970)	6:01
4.	"Every Bloody Emperor"	Hammill	Present (2005)	7:36
5.	"Lemmings"	Hammill	Pawn Hearts (1971)	13:20
6.	"(In the) Black Room"	Hammill	Chameleon in the Shadow of the Night (1973)*	11:16
7.	"Nutter Alert"	Hammill	Present (2005)	6:05
8.	"Darkness (11/11)"	Hammill	The Least We Can Do Is Wave to Each Other (1970)	7:20

(*) Peter Hammill solo album.

Disc two
No.	Title	Writer(s)	Studio release	Length
1.	"Masks"	Hammill	World Record (1976)	6:47
2.	"Childlike Faith in Childhood's End"	Hammill	Still Life (1976)	12:34
3.	"The Sleepwalkers"	Hammill	Godbluff (1975)	10:44
4.	"Man-Erg"	Hammill	Pawn Hearts (1971)	11:36
5.	"Killer"	Hammill, Chris Judge Smith, Hugh Banton	H to He, Who Am the Only One (1970)	9:55
6.	"Wondering"	Banton, Hammill	World Record (1976)	7:01

Disc Three on the Japanese edition (released on Strange Days Records)
No.	Title	Writer(s)	Studio release	Length
1.	"Pilgrims" (recorded Paris, 12 July 2005)	Hammill, Jackson	Still Life (1976)	7:30
2.	"When She Comes" (recorded Amsterdam, 23 July 2005)	Hammill	World Record (1976)	8:08
3.	"Still Life" (recorded Taormina, 15 July 2005)	Hammill	Still Life (1976)	7:51
4.	"Gibberish" (recorded Amsterdam soundcheck, 23 July 2005)	Banton, Evans, Hammill, Jackson	N/A	13:37

== Personnel ==
Van der Graaf Generator

- Peter Hammill – vocals, guitar, pianos
- David Jackson – saxophones, flute
- Hugh Banton – organ, bass pedals
- Guy Evans – drums
