= Merlin Atmos =

Merlin Atmos: Live Performances 2013

Live album by Van der Graaf Generator
- Released: 2 February 2015
- Recorded: June 2013
- Genre: Progressive rock
- Length: 45:35 (vinyl); 70:59 (CD); 142:12 (Special edition)
- Label: Esoteric Antenna
- Producer: Van der Graaf Generator

Van der Graaf Generator chronology
ALT (2012)	Merlin Atmos: Live Performances 2013 (2015)	After the Flood: At the BBC 1968-1977 (2015)

Merlin Atmos: Live Performances 2013 is a live album by English progressive rock band Van der Graaf Generator, released in February 2015. The album was recorded during the band's European tour in June 2013 and includes a full onstage performance of the suite "A Plague of Lighthouse Keepers", originally recorded for Pawn Hearts in 1971.

In addition to the regular version of the album, a special edition containing an extra CD called "Bonus Atmos" and a vinyl version including just the two long suites ("Flight" and "A Plague of Lighthouse Keepers") were also issued.

== Track listing ==
All tracks written by Peter Hammill except where noted.

=== Regular album ===
No.	Title	Writer(s)	Studio release	Length
1.	"Flight"		A Black Box (1980)*	21:30
2.	"Lifetime"		Trisector (2008)	5:11
3.	"All That Before"	Hammill, Hugh Banton, Guy Evans	Trisector (2008)	7:46
4.	"Bunsho"	Hammill, Banton, Evans	A Grounding in Numbers (2011)	5:48
5.	"A Plague of Lighthouse Keepers"	Hammill, Banton, Evans, David Jackson	Pawn Hearts (1971)	24:05
6.	"Gog"		In Camera (1974)*	6:39

=== Bonus Atmos ===
No.	Title	Writer(s)	Studio release	Length
1.	"Interference Patterns"	Hammill, Banton, Evans	Trisector (2008)	4:28
2.	"Over the Hill"	Hammill, Banton, Evans	Trisector (2008)	12:36
3.	"Your Time Starts Now"	Hammill, Banton, Evans	A Grounding in Numbers (2011)	4:14
4.	"Scorched Earth"	Hammill, Jackson	Godbluff (1975)	10:14
5.	"Meurglys III, The Songwriter's Guild"		World Record (1976)	15:24
6.	"Man-Erg"		Pawn Hearts (1971)	11:30
7.	"Childlike Faith in Childhood's End"		Still Life (1976)	12:37

(*) Peter Hammill solo album.

=== Vinyl ===
Side one
No.	Title	Writer(s)	Length
1.	"Flight" i. "Flying Blind" ii. "The White Cane Fandango" iii. "Controll" iv. "Cockpit" v. "Six Worm Wings" vi. "Nothing is Nothing" vii. "A Black Box"	Hammill	21:30

Side two
No.	Title	Writer(s)	Length
1.	"A Plague of Lighthouse Keepers i. "Eyewitness" ii. "Pictures/Lighthouse" iii. "Eyewitness" iv. "SHM" v. "Presence of the Night" vi. "Kosmos Tours" vii. "(Custard's) Last Stand" viii. "The Clot Thickens" ix. "Land's End (Sineline)" x. "We Go Now"	Hammill, Banton, Evans, Jackson	24:05

== Personnel ==
Van der Graaf Generator

- Peter Hammill – vocals, guitar, keyboards
- Hugh Banton – organ, bass pedals
- Guy Evans – drums

== Charts ==
Chart (2015)	Peak position
UK Independent Albums (OCC)	23
UK Rock & Metal Albums (OCC)	12
