= Do Not Disturb (Van der Graaf Generator album) =

Studio album by Van der Graaf Generator
- Released: 30 September 2016
- Recorded: End of 2015/ Spring 2016
- Genre: Progressive rock, art rock
- Length: 57:07
- Label: Esoteric Recordings

Van der Graaf Generator chronology
Merlin Atmos (2015)	Do Not Disturb (2016)

Professional ratings
Review scores
Source	Rating
RTÉ	4/5 stars

Do Not Disturb is the thirteenth studio album by British progressive rock band Van der Graaf Generator. It was released, on Esoteric Recordings, on 30 September 2016.

== Background ==
Reviewing the album for TeamRock, Kris Needs reported that vocalist Peter Hammill had sent organist Hugh Banton and drummer Guy Evans a CD of the new songs, which they spent a week rehearsing, another week recording backing tracks, then six months overdubbing and tweaking at their home studios. Of the album, Needs said:

If, as Peter Hammill has indicated, this is the last Van der Graaf album, these winners of Prog’s Lifetime Achievement award this year are going out with the kind of mind-joltingly gorgeous roller coaster that made them one of the greatest genuinely progressive bands of all time. But there’s also a noticeably reflective aura and sense of closure around their 13th album...

== Reception ==
Reviewing the album for RTÉ, Paddy Kehoe describes the track "(Oh No I Must Have Said) Yes" as "so prog it kind of parodies the genre itself.. " In the tracks "Brought to Book" and "Go", Kehoe sees the spirit of Richard Wright "somehow wafting about." Kehoe writes:

There is sometimes on the album a languorous air of Pink Floyd's haunted pastoralism, or you could imagine Floyd’s keyboards maestro, the late Richard Wright singing one or two of the songs. "Alfa Berlina" opens with choral voices looped backwards and traffic noises. "I’ve got a lifetime's library of unreliable mementos" begin the lyrics – these guys have lived, and then some. Forever Falling's Gibson guitar groove is reminiscent of Jethro Tull, and, like many of the other tracks, it suddenly shifts tempo about a minute in. How on earth did they rehearse these things? One gathers a lot of earnest work went into the creation of this record.

Reviewing the album in The Quietus, Richard Rees Jones suggested it did not match the group's earlier work, and suggested that those unfamiliar with that begin with Still Life, Godbluff or Pawn Hearts. Nevertheless, he called the album ".. a worthy addition to the group's canon and – if this is indeed their last album – a fitting end to an illustrious career":

"To a greater extent here than on previous trio outings, VdGG make efforts to compensate for the absence of Jackson with a more varied instrumental palette. These songs are like compressed multi-part epics, lurching deliriously from moments of piano-led tranquillity to ragged guitar-and-drums freakouts. Banton augments his organ work with deep, resonant bass and tender washes of accordion, there’s a (tad overlong, to tell the truth) jazzy break in the middle of the exuberant rocker "(Oh No I Must Have Said) Yes", while the frenetic instrumental coda to "Almost the Words" is as wild and driven as anything you’ll hear all year. Only on the plaintive closing track "Go" does the mood finally darken, with Hammill’s tone of weary resignation looming over Banton’s desolate organ: "more or less, all for the best, in the end it’s all behind you."

== Track listing ==
No.	Title	Length
1.	"Aloft"	7:20
2.	"Alfa Berlina"	6:40
3.	"Room 1210"	6:48
4.	"Forever Falling"	5:40
5.	"Shikata Ga Nai"	2:29
6.	"(Oh No! I Must Have Said) Yes"	7:44
7.	"Brought to Book"	7:57
8.	"Almost the Words"	7:54
9.	"Go"	4:35

== Personnel ==
=== Musicians ===
- Peter Hammill – vocals, guitars, pianos
- Hugh Banton – organs, keyboards, bass, accordion, glockenspiel
- Guy Evans – drums, percussion

=== Technical ===
- Coordinator – Mark Powell, Vicky Powell
- Design, artwork – Paul Ridout
- Engineer – Ben Turner
- Mastering – Christian Wright
- Photography – Tamra Gray

== Charts ==
Chart (2016)	Peak position
Dutch Albums (Album Top 100)	96
Italian Albums (FIMI)	48
Scottish Albums (Official Charts)	57
UK Albums (Official Charts)	88
UK Independent Albums (Official Charts)	17
UK Rock & Metal Albums (Official Charts)	6
