= A Plague of Lighthouse Keepers =

Song by Van der Graaf Generator

from the album Pawn Hearts
- Released: 12 November 1971
- Recorded: July–September 1971
- Genre: Progressive rock
- Length: 23:04
- Label: Charisma
- Composers: Peter Hammill, Hugh Banton, Guy Evans, David Jackson
- Lyricist: Peter Hammill
- Producer: John Anthony

"A Plague of Lighthouse Keepers" is a song by the English rock band Van der Graaf Generator, from their fourth album Pawn Hearts (1971). It is a concept piece over 23 minutes long, which comprises the whole B-side of the album. "A Plague of Lighthouse Keepers" evolved in the studio, recorded in small sections and pieced together during mixing. The song has many changes in time signature and key signature, and incorporates some musique concrète.

== Recording ==
"A Plague of Lighthouse Keepers" was recorded at intervals between gigs. It was recorded in small sections that were pieced together during mixing, and it took about three to four months to record, non-continuous. According to producer John Anthony, the track features a lot more studio experimentation than on previous albums, saying "we pushed the facilities at Trident to the limit and had involved the use of every single tape machine in Trident at some stage." The experiments included tape manipulation and Hugh Banton experimenting with Mellotron and synthesizer. According to David Jackson, one section of it features the entire band overdubbed 16 times. Robert Fripp provided a cameo appearance on electric guitar, which can be heard in a brief portion of "Presence of the Night".

== Lyrics ==
Peter Hammill, interviewed by Sounds, said: "It's just the story of the lighthouse keeper, that's it on its basic level. And there's the narrative about his guilt and his complexes about seeing people die and letting people die, and not being able to help. In the end – well, it doesn't really have an end, it's really up to you to decide. He either kills himself, or he rationalises it all and can live in peace... Then on the psychic/religious level it's about him coming to terms with himself, and at the end there is either him losing it all completely to insanity, or transcendence; it's either way at the end... And then it's also about the individual coming to terms with society – that's the third level..."

== Live performance ==
In between tours of Italy, in March 1972 the band made an appearance on Belgian television performing "Theme One" and "A Plague of Lighthouse Keepers". Since the studio recording of "A Plague of Lighthouse Keepers" was a collage of multiple recordings, impossible to reproduce live in one setting, the band had individual sections of the song filmed and spliced them together in the editing suite. "We spent two hours working out 'Lighthouse Keepers' because we hadn't played it in months. We had to re-learn it", said Guy Evans. And Banton said: "It was very difficult, we had to film it in two halves", although from watching the DVD it seems there was more than one cut. The recording was released on DVD in February 2003 as Masters from the Vaults (incorrectly labelled as having been recorded in 1971). It is the only confirmed live performance of the song of the era, although it is mentioned that it was played live in Leeds in October 1971.

In 1977 and 1978, Van der Graaf, in a line-up of voice, piano, guitar, bass guitar, drums, violin and cello now and then played a medley in their set, called "Medley: A Plague of Lighthouse Keepers/Sleepwalkers". This song consisted of parts of "A Plague of Lighthouse Keepers" and the second part of "The Sleepwalkers" (from the album Godbluff), glued together. Parts from "A Plague of Lighthouse Keepers" that are used include "Eyewitness" and "The Clot Thickens". A rendition of this medley can be heard on the live album Vital (recorded January 1978), where it is 13:41 long in total. In concerts in 1978, 1979 and 1980 Peter Hammill played the medley solo on piano/keyboard (or with violin accompaniment) a number of times live.

In March 2013, Peter Hammill announced that Van der Graaf Generator would play each night complete renditions of "A Plague of Lighthouse Keepers" in the subsequent tour. A live version finally appeared on their live album Merlin Atmos, released in February 2015.

== Reception ==
AllMusic calls the song "monumental", but believes it is "not as concise as it might've been". Paul Stump, in his 1997 History of Progressive Rock, described "A Plague of Lighthouse Keepers" as the culmination of that period of Van der Graaf Generator. He analyzed that "When tone-clusters are not used, the harmonic language of the piece is perverse, especially in the tart and unsettling chordal sequence of the finale's hollow grandiosity, which sounds as if it is being played by a ghostly silver band. Such two-fisted vehemence was unique in rock at the time, let alone in Progressive - it was the stuff cults were made of." Mojo notes "From one viewpoint, [it] was quite preposterous". The album Pawn Hearts was not a success in the UK, but proved highly successful in Italy, topping the chart there for 12 weeks.

== Song parts ==
All parts written by Peter Hammill, except where indicated.

"A Plague of Lighthouse Keepers" – 23:04

- "Eyewitness" (2:25)
- "Pictures/Lighthouse" (Hammill, Banton) (3:10)
- "Eyewitness" (0:54)
- "S.H.M." (1:57)
- "Presence of the Night" (3:51)
- "Kosmos Tours" (Evans) (1:17)
- "(Custard's) Last Stand" (2:48)
- "The Clot Thickens" (Hammill, Banton, Evans, Jackson) (2:51)
- "Land's End (Sineline)" (Jackson) (2:01)
- "We Go Now" (Jackson, Banton) (1:51)

There is some confusion over the writing credits for the song parts. The booklet of The Box names Banton and Jackson as writers of "Pictures/Lighthouse", but the booklet of the 2005 remaster of Pawn Hearts says that same song part was written by Hammill and Banton.

== Sources ==
- Christopulos, Jim; Smart, Phil (2005). Van der Graaf Generator – The Book. Phil and Jim Publishers. ISBN 978-0-955-13370-1.
- Banks, Joe (2025). Rock and Role: The Visionary Songs of Peter Hammill and Van der Graaf Generator. Kingmaker Publishing. ISBN 978-1-838-49189-5.
