= Van der Graaf Generator =

English rock band formed in 1967

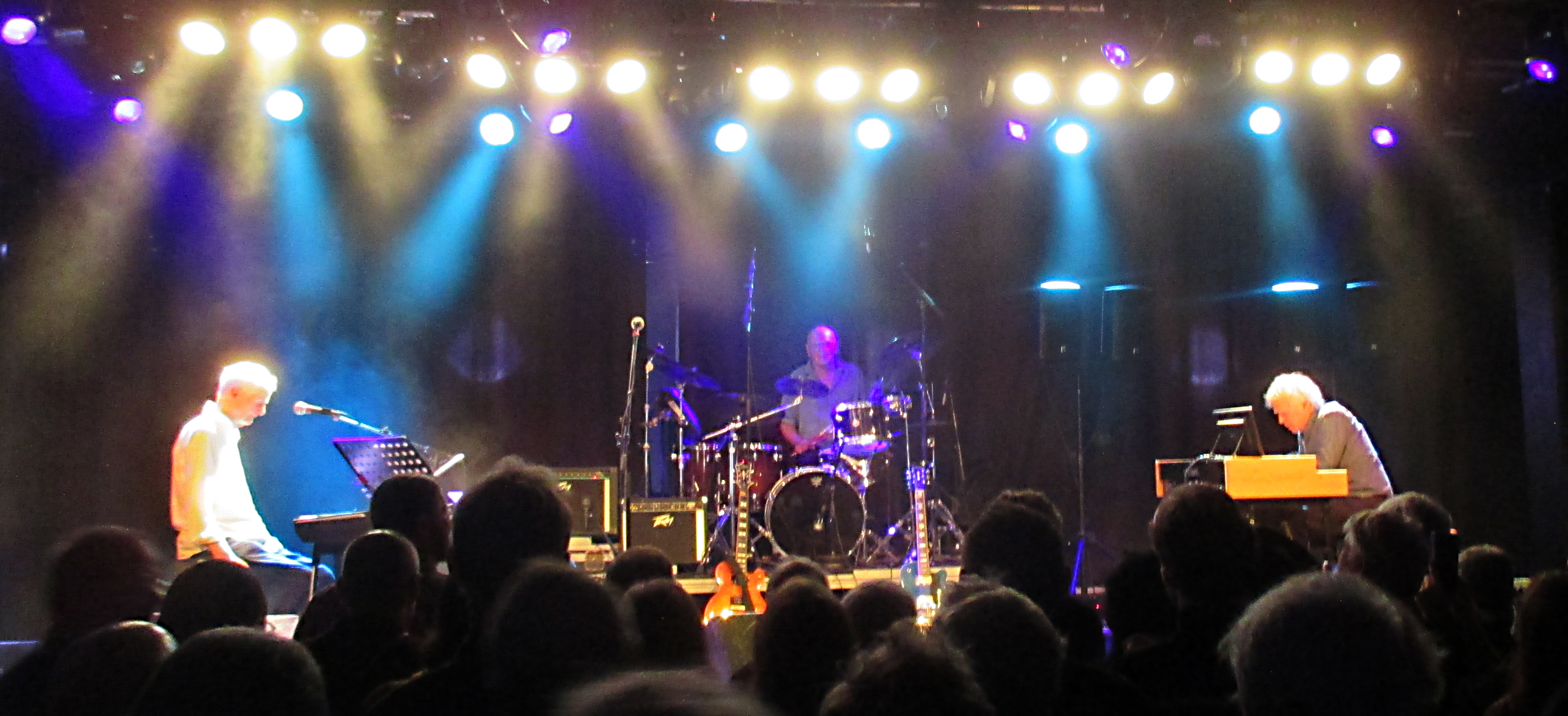
- Van der Graaf Generator on stage in 2021

Background information
- Origin: Manchester, England
- Genres: Progressive rock; experimental rock; art rock
- Works: Van der Graaf Generator discography
- Years active: 1967–1972; 1975–1978; 2005–present
- Labels: Mercury; Charisma; Fontana; Vertigo; Probe; Dunhill; Virgin
- Members: Peter Hammill; Hugh Banton; Guy Evans
- Past members: Chris Judge Smith; Nick Pearne; Keith Ellis; Nic Potter; David Jackson; Graham Smith; Charles Dickie

Van der Graaf Generator are an English progressive rock band, formed in 1967 in Manchester by singer-songwriters Peter Hammill and Chris Judge Smith. They were the first act signed by Charisma Records. They did not experience much commercial success in the UK, but became popular in Italy during the 1970s. In 2005 the band reformed, and are still musically active with a line-up of Hammill, organist Hugh Banton and drummer Guy Evans.

The band formed at the University of Manchester, but settled in London where they signed with Charisma. They went through several incarnations in their early years, including a brief split in 1969. When they reformed, they found minor commercial success with The Least We Can Do Is Wave to Each Other (released in early 1970; their only album to chart in the UK), and after the follow-up album, H to He, Who Am the Only One (December 1970), stabilised around a line-up of Hammill, Banton, Evans and saxophonist David Jackson. The quartet subsequently achieved significant success in Italy with the release of Pawn Hearts in 1971. After several exhausting tours of Italy, the band split in 1972. They reformed in 1975, releasing Godbluff and frequently touring Italy again, before a major line-up change and a slight rename to Van der Graaf. The band split in 1978. After many years apart, the band finally reunited at a gig at the Royal Festival Hall and a short tour in 2005. Since then, the band has continued as a trio of Hammill, Banton, and Evans, who record and tour regularly in between Hammill's concurrent solo career.

The group's albums have tended to be both lyrically and musically darker in atmosphere than many of their progressive rock peers (a trait they shared with King Crimson, whose guitarist Robert Fripp guested on two of their albums), and guitar solos were the exception rather than the rule, preferring to use Banton's classically influenced organ, and, until his departure, Jackson's multiple saxophones. While Hammill is the primary songwriter for the band, and members have contributed to his solo albums, the band arranges all its material collectively. Hammill's lyrics covered themes of mortality, due to his love of science fiction writers such as Robert A. Heinlein and Philip K. Dick, along with his confessed warped and obsessive nature. His voice has been a distinctive component of the band throughout its career, with Hammill himself having been described as "a male Nico" or "the Hendrix of the voice". Though the group have generally been commercially unsuccessful, they have inspired several musicians across various genres.

== History ==
=== Formation and early years (1967–69) ===
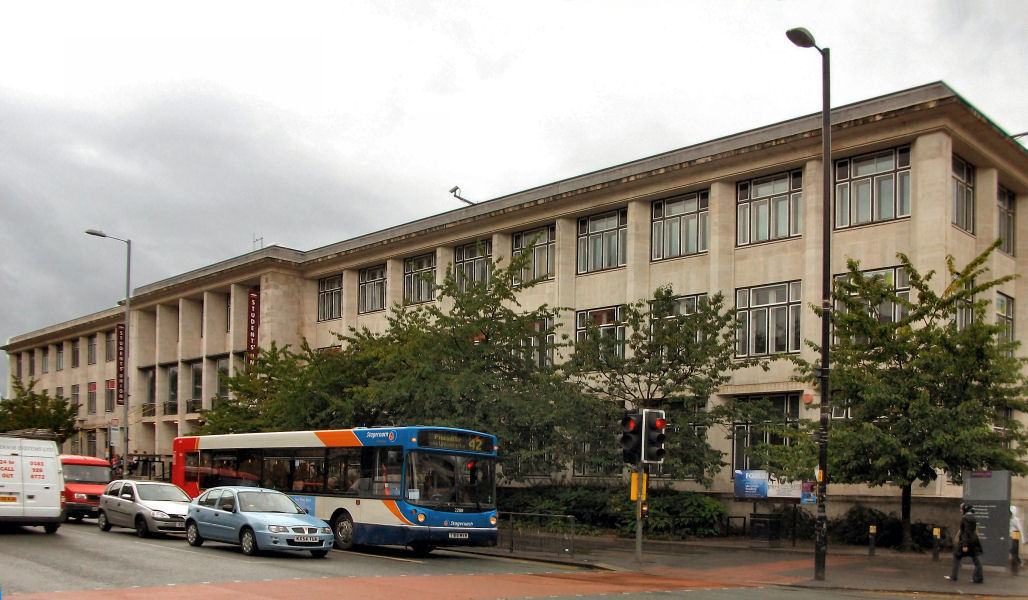
The band were originally formed by students at the University of Manchester.

The band formed in 1967 at the University of Manchester, after Chris Judge Smith, who had already played in several British rhythm and blues groups whilst a pupil in Oundle School, returned from a trip to San Francisco and, inspired by the bands he had seen, put together a list of possible band names to form a new group. After an unsatisfactory audition they had both attended in response to an advert to form a band, he met fellow student Peter Hammill, who was playing some of his original songs. Hammill had begun writing songs and poetry at the age of 12 while at prep school, and progressed to playing in bands while a pupil at Beaumont College. He was then briefly employed as a computer programmer, during which time he subsequently claimed to have written much of the band's early material, before enrolling at Manchester. Smith was so impressed with the quality of Hammill's original material that the two agreed to form a band together. The band name chosen from Smith's list was based on a Van de Graaff generator, an electro-mechanical device that produces static electricity with lightning-like flashes – the misspelling is accidental. Smith recalls the reason for this may have been that the device's inventor, the American physicist Robert Van de Graaff, died in 1967, which was widely reported in the media.

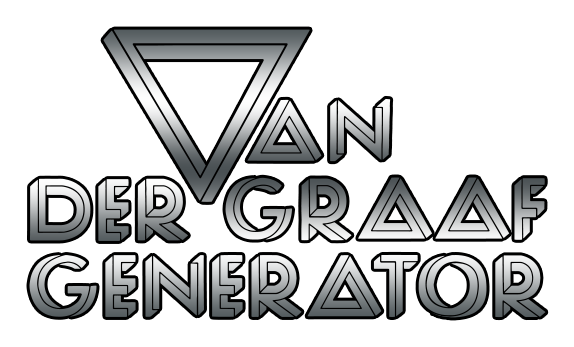
The band's logo

Among the bands that regularly played the university, including Cream, Jimi Hendrix, and Pink Floyd, they were particularly impressed by The Crazy World of Arthur Brown, and recruited an organist, Nick Pearne, to match the format of Arthur Brown's band. Along with two female dancers, the initial line-up was Hammill on guitar and vocals, Smith on drums, wind instruments and vocals, and Pearne on organ (though he did not initially have an instrument). According to Smith, the band initially played as a two-piece, with Smith occasionally using a typewriter as a percussion instrument; their first gig as a three-piece was in the student union, which lasted five minutes before the group's amplifiers blew up.

The band managed to persuade fellow student Caleb Bradley to manage them, and by the start of 1968, the band had managed to record a demo tape influenced by blues and jazz, sending it to Lou Reizner, then the U.K. head of Mercury Records, who offered the trio of Hammill, Smith, and Pearne a recording contract in May. At this point, the band had to make a decision whether to stay on at university, or quit their courses and move to London to turn professional. Pearne was not keen to abandon his studies, so decided to leave the group.

On arrival in London, Hammill and Smith met up with classically trained organist Hugh Banton, who was a brother of one of their friends back in Manchester. Later that year, they met Tony Stratton Smith, who agreed to sign a management contract with them in December. Through him, the band acquired a bass guitar player, Keith Ellis, with drummer Guy Evans joining not too long afterwards. This line-up recorded a series of demos for Mercury, before recording a single ("People You Were Going To" b/w "Firebrand") on Polydor Records, which was released in January 1969. Melody Maker said the single was "one of the best records of the week". But the single was quickly withdrawn under pressure from Mercury, since it violated the contract band members Hammill and Smith signed the previous year. Smith, feeling superfluous to requirements, left the band, amicably, shortly after the recording of the single. He later released demos featuring his time in Van der Graaf Generator on a CD, Democrazy. The remaining 4 members performed for John Peel on BBC Radio 1's Top Gear radio show in November, and played several gigs in England in the next months.

Meanwhile, Mercury refused to let the band record, and at the same time Stratton Smith refused to let the other members of the band sign to Mercury too, as he did not think the deal was fair to the band (only Hammill remained now of the original three who had signed with Mercury). On top of that in late January 1969 the band's van and equipment were stolen. The theft aggravated their financial difficulties. Although the band was touring successfully, which included a concert in February at the Royal Albert Hall in support of Jimi Hendrix, they broke up in June after playing a final gig at Nottingham's Pop & Blues Festival on 10 May entirely with borrowed equipment. John Peel, who was compering the show, announced their break-up to the audience.

In July 1969, Hammill had begun performing solo at the Marquee Club in London, and since there was no group, he decided to record what was intended to be his first solo album at Trident Studios on 31 July and 1 August, with Banton, Evans, and Ellis as session musicians. However, through a deal worked out by Stratton Smith, the album, The Aerosol Grey Machine, was released in September 1969 by Mercury under the group's name in return for releasing them from their contract. The album was initially only released in the United States with hardly any promotion at all, so sales were minimal, but the group decided to reform in the middle of the recording session. Ellis had already committed to joining Juicy Lucy and was replaced by Evans' former bandmate in The Misunderstood, Nic Potter. The band had also enjoyed flautist Jeff Peach's contributions to the album and wanted to recruit a further instrumentalist. "There was always the idea of having another melodic instrument," recalled Evans. "He [Banton]'ll play a solo, sure, and really give it something, but he doesn't want to do that all the time." Peach was approached to become a full-time member, but dropped out after one rehearsal, doubting that his playing style fitted the band. The position was eventually filled by saxophonist and flautist David Jackson, who had previously played alongside Smith in a band called Heebalob. Hammill had already sat in with Heebalob at the Plumpton National Jazz Festival on 9 August, and, impressed by Jackson's playing, invited him to join the band, partly because he also needed a flatmate to help to pay the rent.

=== Signing to Charisma (1969–70) ===
"After the Flood"
This track, from The Least We Can Do Is Wave to Each Other, features Peter Hammill's voice with electronic distortion.

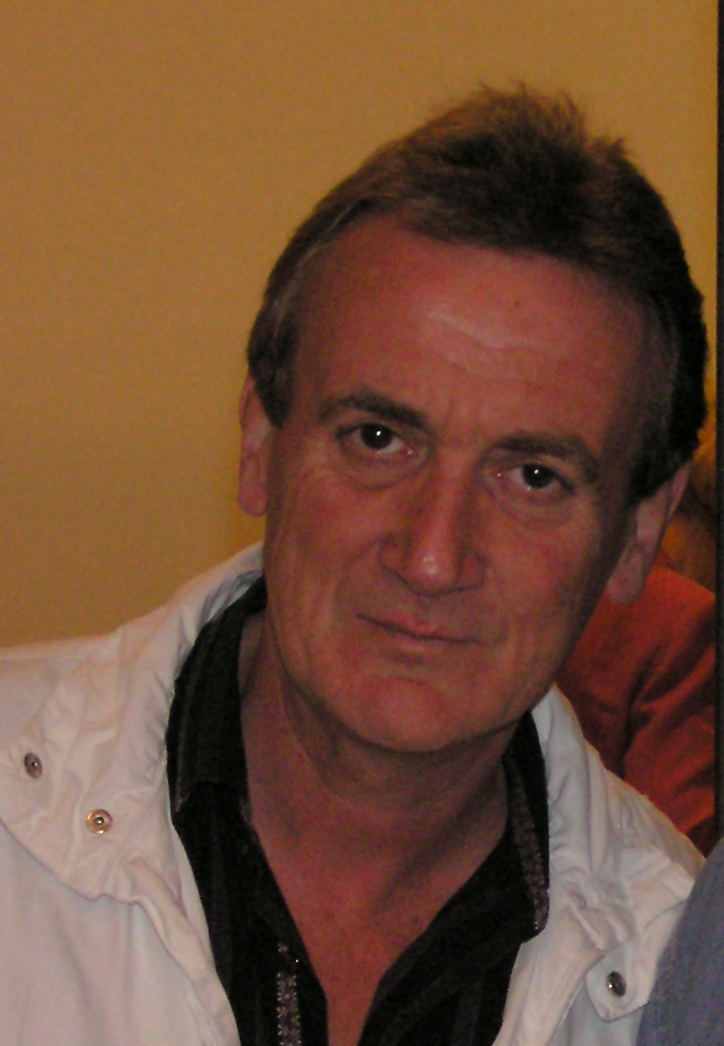
Nic Potter (pictured in 2007) joined the band in 1969 and played bass with them until August 1970, then again from 1977 to 1978

In September, the new five-piece band began rehearsals in Notting Hill Gate and began to change its sound. Banton, influenced by the effects pedals popularised by Jimi Hendrix, used his electronic skills to modify a Farfisa organ, giving it a wider variety of sounds. Jackson was inspired by jazz musicians, particularly Rahsaan Roland Kirk, and began to play multiple saxophones (usually alto and tenor) simultaneously. Hammill, for his part, elected to sing in received pronunciation, exploring the full range of his vocal capabilities. "We were all megalomaniacs", said Banton. "We grabbed our own space as best we could." The band started to gig regularly, including the first of several live appearances at the Friars Aylesbury in November.

Tony Stratton Smith formed Charisma Records and signed the band as his first act, who recorded their second album, The Least We Can Do Is Wave to Each Other from 11–14 December 1969 with producer John Anthony in Trident Studios. Hammill's voice was electronically treated on "After the Flood", while "Refugees" and "White Hammer" featured cello and cornet respectively. Because the band finished ahead of their rehearsal schedule, Potter decided to overdub some electric guitar – an instrument he had never played before. The album was released in February 1970 and made the top 50 in the UK, Melody Maker said "If all our groups were as together as this, the British music scene would improve ten-fold."

Potter, however, did not feel he fitted into the increasingly experimental sound the band was developing, and tended to wait until the others had worked out their parts during rehearsals, adding his bass lines on top at the last minute. After recording three tracks of their third album, H to He, Who Am the Only One, he decided to quit the band. His last gig was on 9 August at the 1970 Plumpton Festival. The remaining members auditioned Dave Anderson, roadie for Brinsley Schwarz and friend of the band, but after a week's rehearsal found that things weren't working out musically. Banton, meanwhile, had become influenced by Vincent Crane's work in Atomic Rooster, where Crane played the bass lines on a Hammond organ's bass pedals and suggested that he could do this as well. With just days to go before the next gig, they tried rehearsing as a four-piece, and it was successful. Banton later played bass guitar on certain songs, having already learned the instrument in the mid-1960s, and Hammill expanded his instrumental capabilities on stage to cover piano and keyboards as well as guitar. Jackson modified his saxophones to be completely electric, as opposed to simply being amplified through a microphone, and combined the sound with a wah-wah pedal and an octave divider.

H to He continued to be recorded sporadically throughout 1970, and featured Robert Fripp of King Crimson contributing guitar on "The Emperor in His War-Room". Producer John Anthony knew Fripp socially and invited him to a session as a guest, something Fripp had never done before at that point. According to Jackson, Fripp "put headphones on and started searing away", listening to the track once, then performing two takes. "Killer", later to become a live favourite, recycled a middle eight from an old Heebalob song, and Smith received a co-composition credit on the track. The album was released in December, but didn't sell as well as The Least We Can Do... because of the lack of a hit. Charisma proposed "Killer" as a single, but the band rejected this. Reviewing the album, Sounds particularly praised Jackson's saxophone work, but critical reception overall was mixed.

=== The classic line-up (1971–72) ===
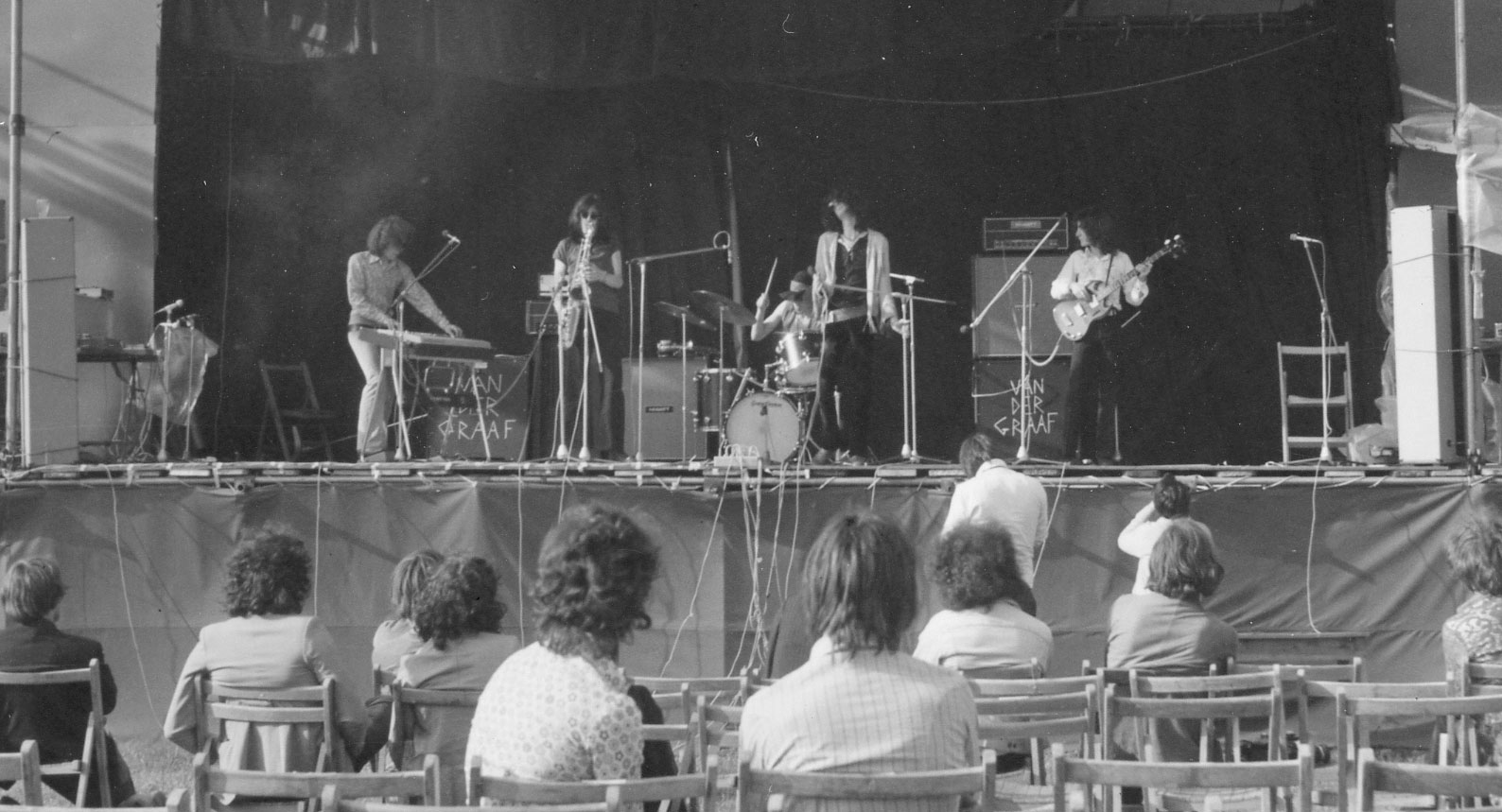
The band performing in 1970 in Plumpton

The Hammill/Banton/Jackson/Evans quartet that resulted from H to He, Who Am the Only One is now considered the "classic" line-up. The group played on the 'Six Bob Tour' (Note: "Six Bob" referred to the price of tickets and was British slang for six shillings, equivalent to £4 in 2025) in early 1971 with fellow Charisma labelmates Genesis and Lindisfarne. Despite the complexity of their music, the band were well received on the tour, with Hammill noting "at nearly all the gigs, most of the audience have known most of the songs ... It was like a big family actually, exactly as all of us had pictured it in our wildest dreams."

While on tour, the band started working out compositions between gigs for their next album, which would become Pawn Hearts. The intention was to release a double album, and the band recorded the material; however, for economic reasons, the released recording was a single album containing three tracks – "Lemmings", "Man-Erg", and the 23 minute concept piece "A Plague of Lighthouse Keepers". Reflecting on this, Hammill said: "Charisma Records felt that it wasn't appropriate for us to release a double album and they vetoed the live studio recordings and the solo tracks by Guy, David, and Hugh." The master tape of the recording sessions has been lost. Fripp again provided a cameo appearance on guitar. While "Man-Erg" had already been performed on stage, "A Plague of Lighthouse Keepers" evolved in the studio, recorded in small sections and pieced together during mixing. According to producer John Anthony, the track features a lot more studio experimentation than on previous albums, saying "we pushed the facilities at Trident to the limit and had involved the use of every single tape machine in Trident at some stage." The experiments included tape manipulation and Banton playing Mellotron and synthesizer. According to Jackson, one section of it features the entire band overdubbed 16 times. The album was released in October 1971 and was not a success in the U.K, but proved highly successful in Italy, topping the chart there for 12 weeks. The following single, "Theme One", reached number one in Italy, too. "Theme One" was an instrumental piece, originally written by Beatles producer George Martin as a fanfare for the BBC radio station Radio 1, later to appear on US pressings of Pawn Hearts.

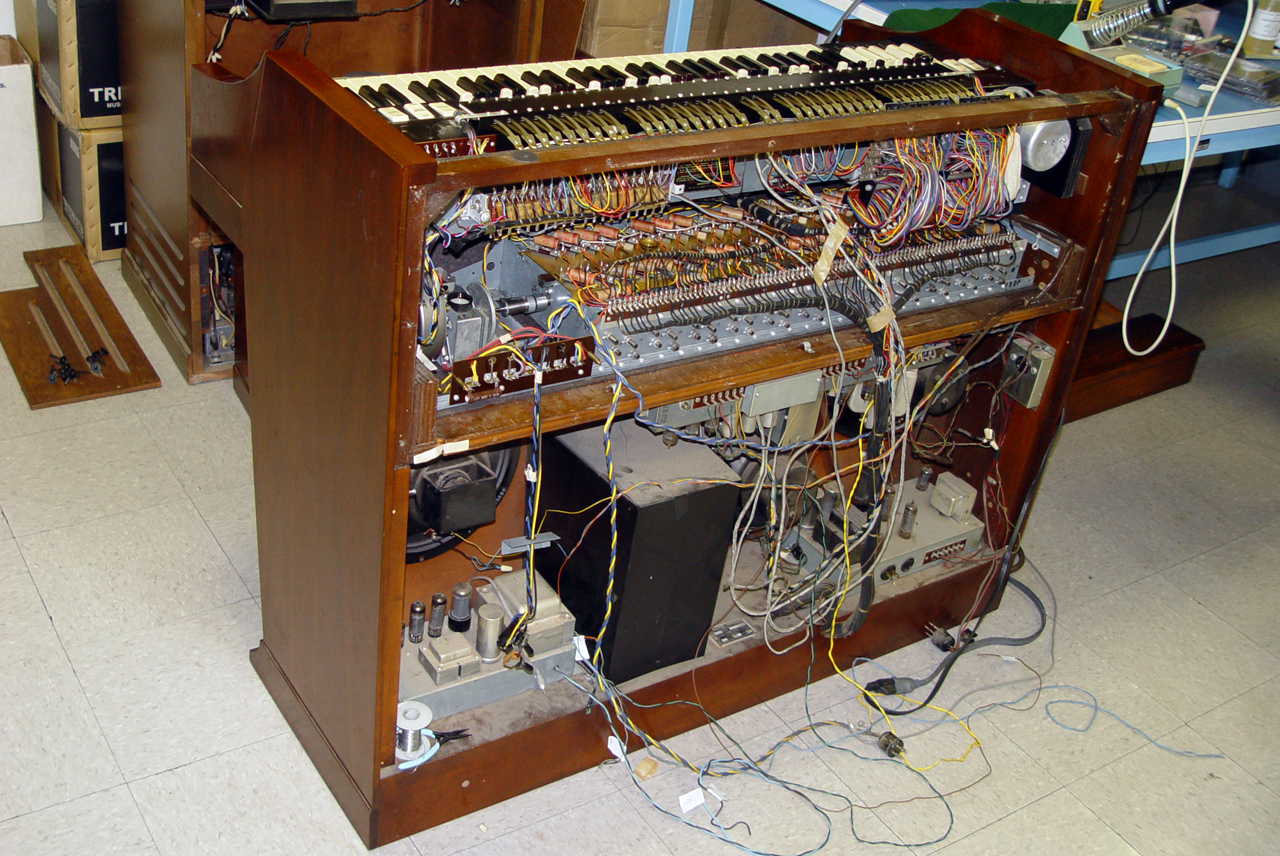
Hugh Banton used a Hammond E-112 organ, modified with electronics, as a key ingredient of the band's early sound

Following commercial success in Italy, the band did a six-week tour there at the start of 1972. The band were apprehensive about touring there, concerned they might be playing to half empty venues, but they were all shocked by the sheer volume of the crowds that came to see them. "Pawn Hearts was seen as the ultimate album by the ultimate band," said Jackson, who at times found it difficult to walk down the street in parts of Italy without being recognised. "The tour was like the prophets have landed ... you couldn't go anywhere without this lunatic 'Generator Mania' breaking out." After the tour, the group was immediately offered another Italian tour, this time doing up to three shows a day. In between the tours, the band made an appearance on Belgian television performing "Theme One" and "A Plague of Lighthouse Keepers". Since the studio recording of "A Plague of Lighthouse Keepers" was a collage of multiple recordings, impossible to reproduce live in one setting, the band simply filmed individual sections of the song and spliced them together in the editing suite. It was the only live performance of the song until 2013.

By June, the band had performed another Italian tour (the third that year) and wanted to start recording new material (some of which ended up on Hammill's 1973 solo album Chameleon in the Shadow of the Night). However, the combination of working for too long without a break, combined with a lack of support from Stratton Smith and Charisma and continued financial difficulties caused the band to implode, and Hammill left to pursue a solo career in mid-1972.

The three remaining members recorded an instrumental album with Nic Potter, Ced Curtis, and Pietro Messina, under the name 'The Long Hello'. Their self-titled album (The Long Hello) was released in 1974.

=== First reunion (1975–78) ===
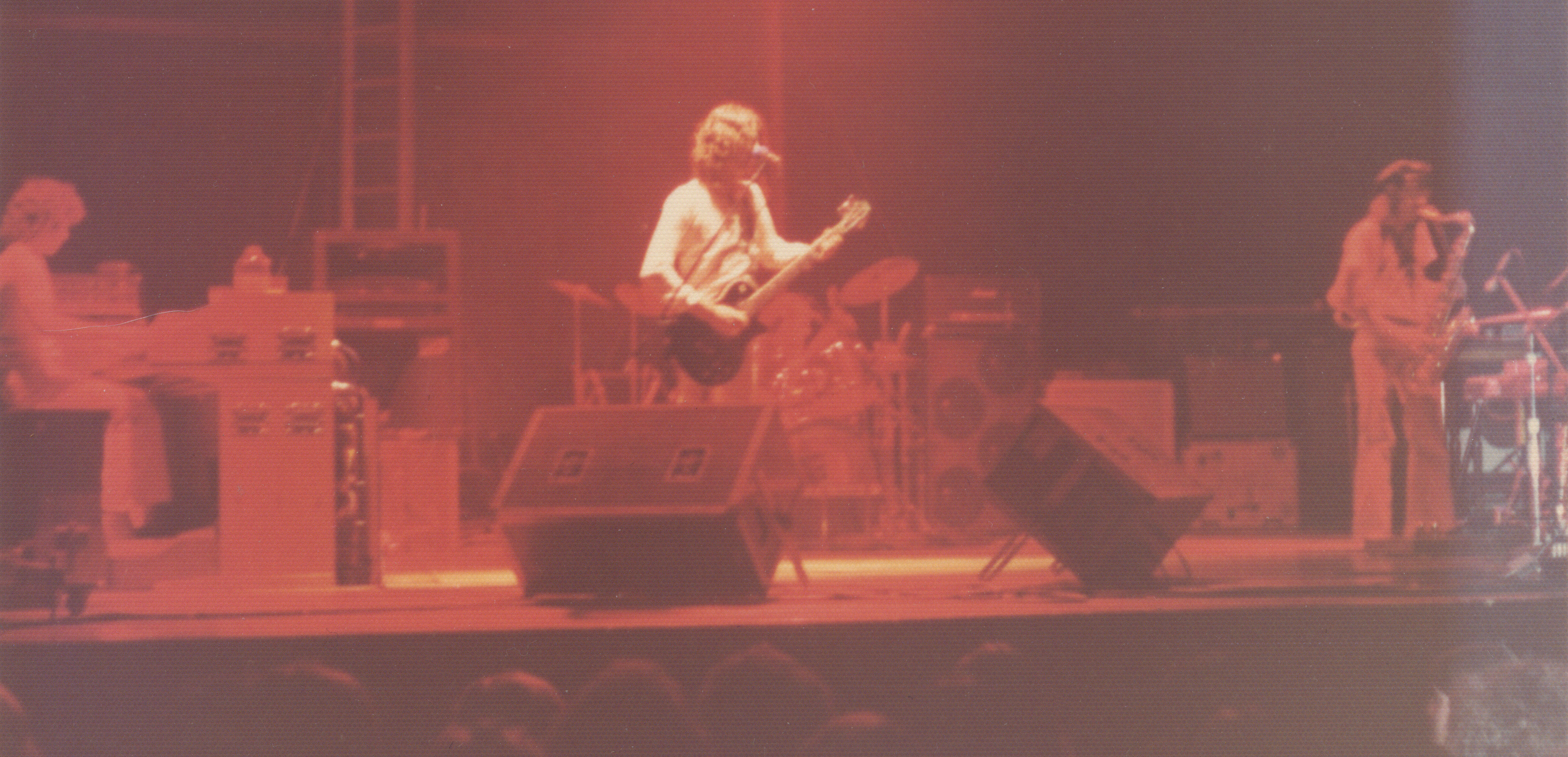
The band performing in 1976 at Massey Hall in Toronto

Hammill's split with the group was amicable, and Banton, Jackson, and Evans, among others, all contributed to his solo work at various times. By February 1975, the members of the band were ready to work with each other in a full-time capacity again, and they decided to reform the band. All the members were keen on carrying on with new music, with no nostalgia for their previous era, and did not want to play earlier stage favourites such as "Killer" (the opening track on H to He, Who Am the Only One) and "Theme One". "We didn't want to continue as if nothing had happened," said Hammill. Banton was in the middle of building a custom organ at the time, and halted the project to join the reformed group, using a rented Hammond C3 organ instead. Hammill began playing electric guitar in the band, which had been conspicuously absent earlier in their career.

The reformed band worked at a prolific pace, rehearsing, and touring France before recording three new albums in just 12 months, beginning with Godbluff (October 1975). Unlike the earlier work with John Anthony at Trident, the sessions were produced by the band themselves, and both the Melody Maker and Sounds thought they were a tighter and more cohesive unit than previously. The album in particular saw Hammill making significant use of the Hohner clavinet keyboard. Still Life followed on 15 April 1976. Banton considers this album one of his favourites by the group.

In the summer of 1975, the band gigged in Italy without incident, but when they returned to tour there in November, the intense political situation the country was going through caught up with them. The opening concert in Padua was marked with clashes with communists delivering political speeches, and the audience started throwing missiles towards the stage. After a gig without incident in Genoa, the third day of the tour at the PalaSport in Rome, in front of 40,000 people, saw similar confrontations to the Padua gig. A fire broke out at the venue, but was brought under control. The next day, the band learned that most of their gear had been stolen from the tour van, including Hammill's blue Fender Stratocaster, christened "Meurglys". Despite threats from promoters that the band would continue the tour using hired equipment (which Jackson considered impossible given the electronic modifications he had made to his saxophones), they abandoned the tour. Miraculously, all of Jackson's saxophones had survived the theft.

In December 1976, following the World Record tour, Banton quit, and in January 1977, Potter returned to replace him alongside the violinist Graham Smith (formerly of Charisma folk-rock band String Driven Thing). Jackson then also decided to leave, resulting in a four-piece line-up with a quite different sound, to play the spring tour. They produced the album The Quiet Zone/The Pleasure Dome, which was released in September 1977, and it was for that release that "the Generator bit was dropped with little fuss" for a shortened name of Van der Graaf. Cellist and keyboardist Charles Dickie joined the band in August and remained with them for their last year. A further studio album was never recorded, but this line-up recorded a live double-album Vital in January 1978, featuring several new songs. Jackson reunited with the band as guest for these concerts and appeared on six tracks. By the time the album was released in July 1978, the band had already split because of lack of record company support in the United States and financial difficulties.

In 1982 a collection of out-takes and rehearsal recordings from the 1972–1975 hiatus was released (initially on cassette only), called Time Vaults. Intended only as a gift for hardcore fans these are mostly not studio-quality recordings, some of them have even a quite bad audio quality full of distortions.

=== Second reunion (2005) ===
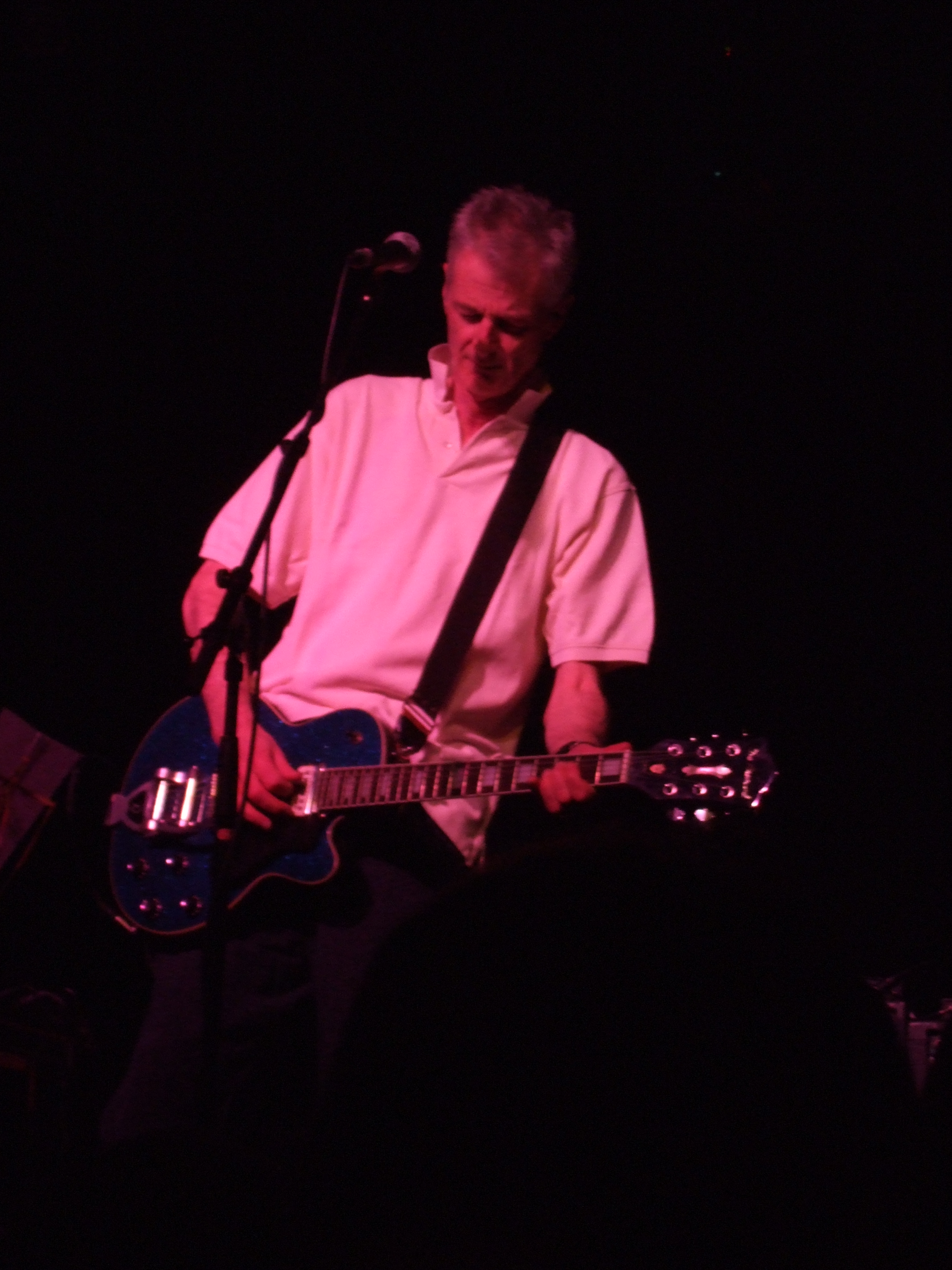
Peter Hammill playing guitar with the band in Amsterdam in 2008

Despite the 1978 split, Banton recalled that the group "never descended very far into our sub-conscience". Banton, Jackson and Evans appeared on Hammill's solo albums, and all four occasionally played together. In 1996, the quartet appeared on stage during a concert by Hammill and Evans at the Union Chapel in London to perform "Lemmings", which was later in March 1997 released as The Union Chapel Concert. In 2003, Banton, Jackson, and Evans joined with Hammill to perform "Still Life" at the Queen Elizabeth Hall in London.

Following the Queen Elizabeth Hall performance, the band members discussed working together. In mid-2004, they began to write and rehearse new material. The result was a double CD, Present, released in April 2005. Critical response was favourable; BBC Music's Peter Marsh said the group was "willing to push the envelope a little, and bless them for that", while AllMusic's Dave Thompson said the group "never made a less than fabulous album in their lives. And they're not about to start now." A reunion concert took place at the Royal Festival Hall, London, on 6 May 2005, which was released as Real Time in March 2007. The Festival Hall concert was followed by several European dates in the summer and autumn. The concert in Leverkusen, Germany on 5 November was filmed for the Westdeutscher Rundfunk TV show Rockpalast, which was broadcast on 16 January 2006.

Hammill stated in a December 2005 newsletter that there were no plans for further recordings or performances by the "classic" Van der Graaf Generator line-up of himself, Banton, Evans and Jackson. Hammill subsequently announced that the band would be continuing as a trio, for live and studio work, without Jackson. He later stated that the reason for Jackson's departure was that he "seemed to have difficulty in understanding what we had mutually agreed" and that he clashed with the other band members. Relationships between Jackson and the others became strained, and Hammill, Banton and Evans realised that the only way the group could continue was without him.

=== Trio (2006 – present) ===
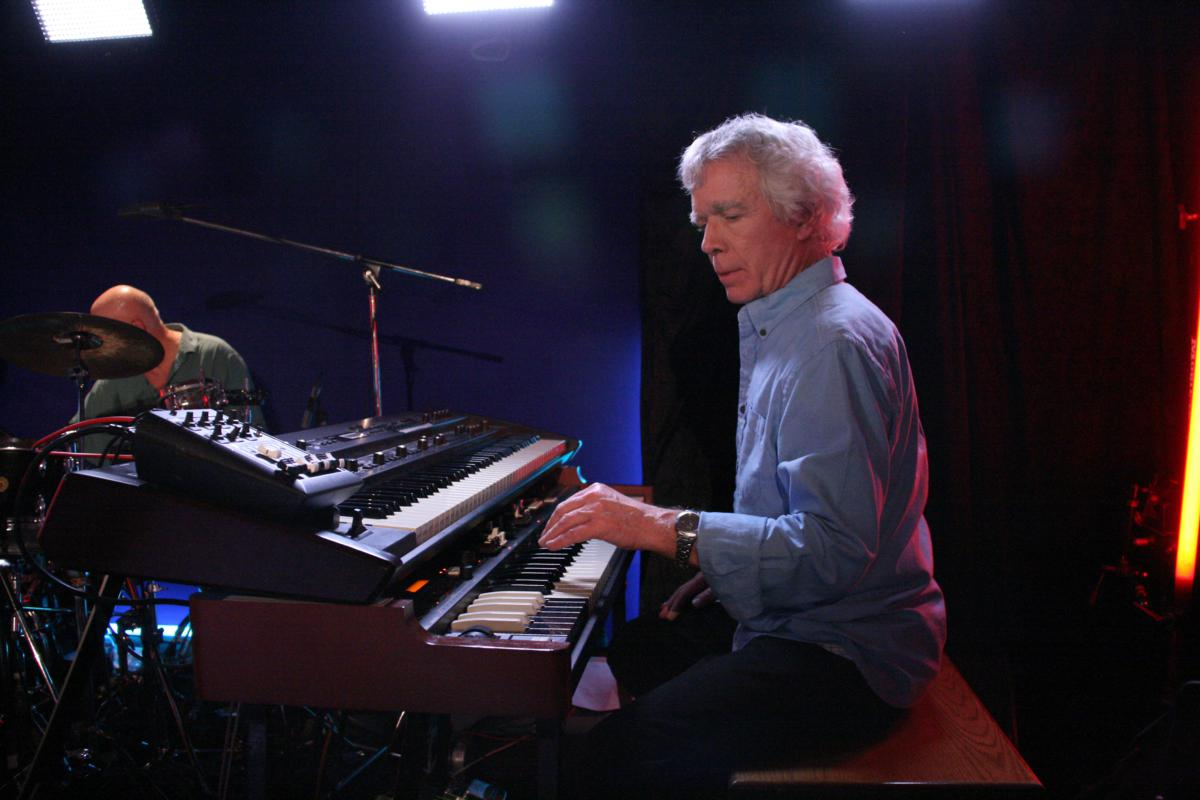
Hugh Banton on stage with Van der Graaf Generator in 2010

After Jackson's departure, the group took a break before touring as a trio in April and July 2007 over Europe. A concert on 14 April 2007 in the Paradiso in Amsterdam was recorded and streamed on the FabChannel website until March 2009, and was released on DVD and CD that June.

The first trio recording, Trisector, was released on 17 March 2008. Live concerts were played in Europe in March and April, and in Japan in June, among them, one at the Gouveia Art Rock Festival. There were further concerts in January 2009 in Europe, and the band played several concerts in Canada and the United States in the summer of 2009, among them a performance at NEARfest in Bethlehem, Pennsylvania. It was only the second time the band had visited the United States, the first being to New York City in 1976.

In spring 2010, the group recorded a new album in Devon. A Grounding in Numbers was released on 14 March 2011. Live at Metropolis Studios 2010 was released as a 2CD/1DVD set by Salvo/Union Square Music on 4 June 2012. The band then toured the eastern part of the United States and Canada during June and July 2012, including an appearance at NEARfest Apocalypse in Bethlehem, Pennsylvania on 22 June. An album of out-takes and in-studio jams, similar to the second disc of Present, called ALT was released in June 2012. Hammill has stated that he has enjoyed the current reunion, as "the activity has reinvigorated me. Going from one thing to another is an energizing thing."

Hammill revealed via his website that the band's former bassist Nic Potter died on the night of 16 January 2013, aged 61.

The group continued to tour in 2013, including the first live performance of "A Plague of Lighthouse Keepers". In 2014, the group collaborated with Soviet dissident artist Vladislav Shabalin for an art venture titled the Earlybird Project. The title comes from the track of the same name on ALT. In 2015, the group released the live album, Merlin Atmos featuring tracks recorded during the 2013 tour, and After the Flood, an album of BBC recordings from 1968–1977. A new album, Do Not Disturb was released in September 2016. It included the song "Alfa Berlina" which documented the group's 1970s Italian tours. Critics speculated that it would be the band's last album, though this has not been confirmed.

In 2021 the band embarked on a European tour, due to continue until May 2022. On 24 and 25 October 2021 the band played for the first time in Finland, in two concerts at the Savoy Theatre in Helsinki. Hammill and Banton performed as a duo as Evans was not allowed to cross the border when his passport was found to be no longer valid, due to recent increased severity in the Brexit regulations. The passport issue was resolved before the band went on to two shows in Stockholm and Gothenburg, Sweden and one in Oslo, Norway.

In February 2026 (in an interview with Louder) Hammill confirmed that Van der Graaf Generator were "currently dormant", although it was "not impossible" that they would play live again, and that he "wasn't ruling out" the recording of another album despite "[not having] come up with that material yet. But again, never say never."

== Musical style ==
No one is likely to confuse the savage energy of King Crimson and Van der Graaf Generator in their mid-1970s incarnations with the disinterested density of Gentle Giant or the more pastoral, at times delicate, stylizations of Genesis or Renaissance (or even Yes in their quieter moments).

— Edward Macan,

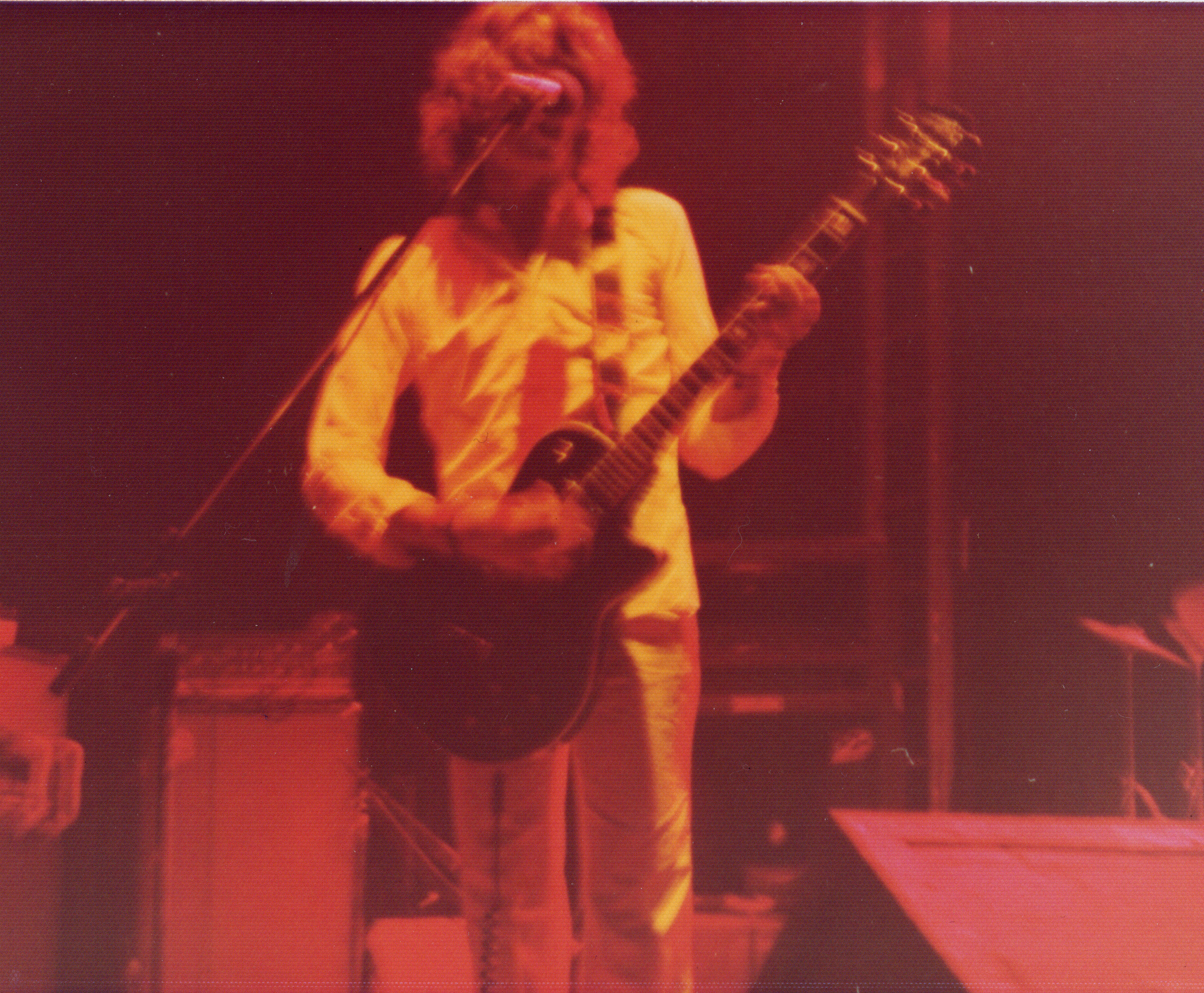
Hammill performing in 1976

Van der Graaf Generator are a progressive rock band. Writing in Record Collector, Toby Manning said the music was "philosophical, even intellectual, complex .. at times, terrifying". While the music on The Aerosol Grey Machine (September 1969) has a more pastoral, hippie feel, with prominent use of Hammill's acoustic guitar, later work featured more complex instrumentation and arrangements. Hammill thinks the style of the band evolved due to the culture of music in the late 1960s, stating "the whole of music was laid out in front of you ... it was the blues in wonky time signatures." Both Hammill and Banton have stated that Jimi Hendrix was an influence on the band's sound, with Hammill remarking that "there'd been distortion before, but there hadn't been that real out-there attitude to sound in itself". The group's experimental style has also been compared to Krautrock bands such as Can. Because of their musical influences and line-up, the band tended to play darker musical themes than other progressive bands, with the possible exception of King Crimson. However, Hammill has stated that the group is still fun to work with, stating "as far as we're concerned, it's serious fun, but fun nonetheless." Promoting Do Not Disturb, he said "We love making a racket, and that has to do with chaos, which is pretty punk".

"My Room (Waiting for Wonderland)"
From the 1976 album Still Life

Hammill's lyrics frequently covered themes of mortality, due to his love of science fiction writers such as Robert A. Heinlein and Philip K. Dick, along with his self-confessed warped and obsessive nature. His voice has been a distinctive component of the band throughout its career. It has been described as "a male Nico" and would later on be cited as an influence by Goth bands in the 1980s.

Unlike several other notable prog rock keyboardists, such as Rick Wakeman or Keith Emerson, Banton considers himself primarily an organist, due to his background in classical and church music, and only ever used that instrument on stage, albeit heavily modified with customised electronics and devices. Hammill said that "Hugh is one of the most instinctive, baffling, and brilliant people I've known and his intuitive hold on the worlds of music and electronics has always astonished me." Banton used clonewheel organs during the 2005 reformation, but since 2009 he has used the Hammond XK-3c, and thinks Hammond have "cracked that sound at long last".

Although Hammill has written the vast majority of the songs in the band's catalogue, and all of the lyrics, he is keen to stress that the arrangements of the music comes from all the group's members. In 1976, being interviewed for the Melody Maker, he said that "VDGG is a band, a real band ... of course [it] is something special, it releases in individual terms parts of us that wouldn't be aired otherwise. In 2013, he reiterated, "Some people don't think Van der Graaf is a democracy, but believe me, it's entirely democratic, with everyone having very vocal and forceful opinions." Since the band has stabilised around Hammill, Banton and Evans, the members think there is a good balance of opinion, with somebody always having the casting vote.

The band have been compared with Genesis due to being label-mates at Charisma Records, sharing management with Tony Stratton Smith and performing on the same bill on the 'Six Bob Tour'. Hammill and Banton both reject this comparison, with Hammill noting that Genesis were far more driven to be commercially successful, whereas he prefers to release music without interference from record companies. In particular, he has mentioned that while he himself continues to release albums on a regular basis in the 21st century, Peter Gabriel's "average output has been about 0.2 albums a year".

== Influence ==
Though the group have generally been commercially unsuccessful outside of early 1970s Italy, they have inspired notable musicians, including Rush and Julian Cope. Philip Oakey of the Human League said, "The band we really cared about was Van der Graaf Generator. That music was so committed."

They were also namechecked by the likes of Graham Coxon, Mikael Åkerfeldt, Cedric Bixler-Zavala and Omar Rodríguez-López of The Mars Volta, Marc Almond, Stephen Morris, Jello Biafra, Mark E. Smith and John Lydon. Coxon is particularly fond of "House with No Door" from H to He (1970), saying the track is "extremely beautiful, with Jackson's truly lovely sax-and-flute instrumental section." Almond recalled hearing "Killer" for the first time saying, "I'd never heard anything like it before. It wasn't just Peter's snarling operatic vocal, it was the mix of instruments ... I became an instant fan." Mentioning their reputation as something of an acquired taste, Lydon said, "There's a few Van der Graaf things I like, but I'm not going to recommend anything to anyone. It might not be for them. Music doesn't come with a set of guidelines." Bruce Dickinson – a fan of the band since he saw them at Oundle School aged 13 – hailed Hammill as one of his childhood heroes.

Although Van der Graaf Generator are generally categorised as progressive rock, Cope was keen to distance the band from that movement: "Their music was like some Brechtian bar band – the opposite of prog rock, really". Nevertheless, the band have been acknowledged as an influence on the neo-prog subgenre that emerged in the 1980s, producing Marillion as its most successful band. Hammill's singing style influenced Marillion singer Fish and he was a support act on Marillion's first album tour.

== Members ==
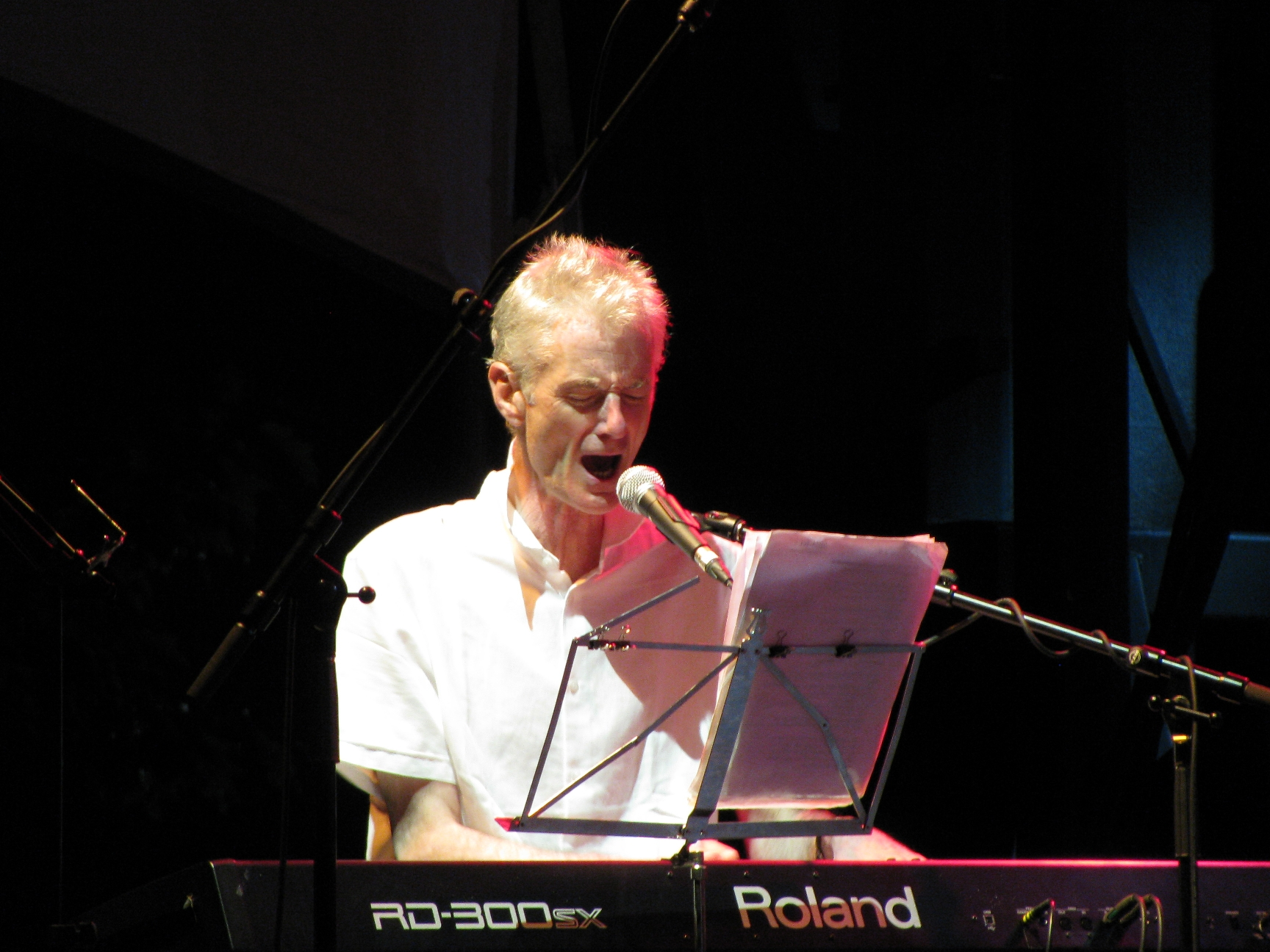
Hammill

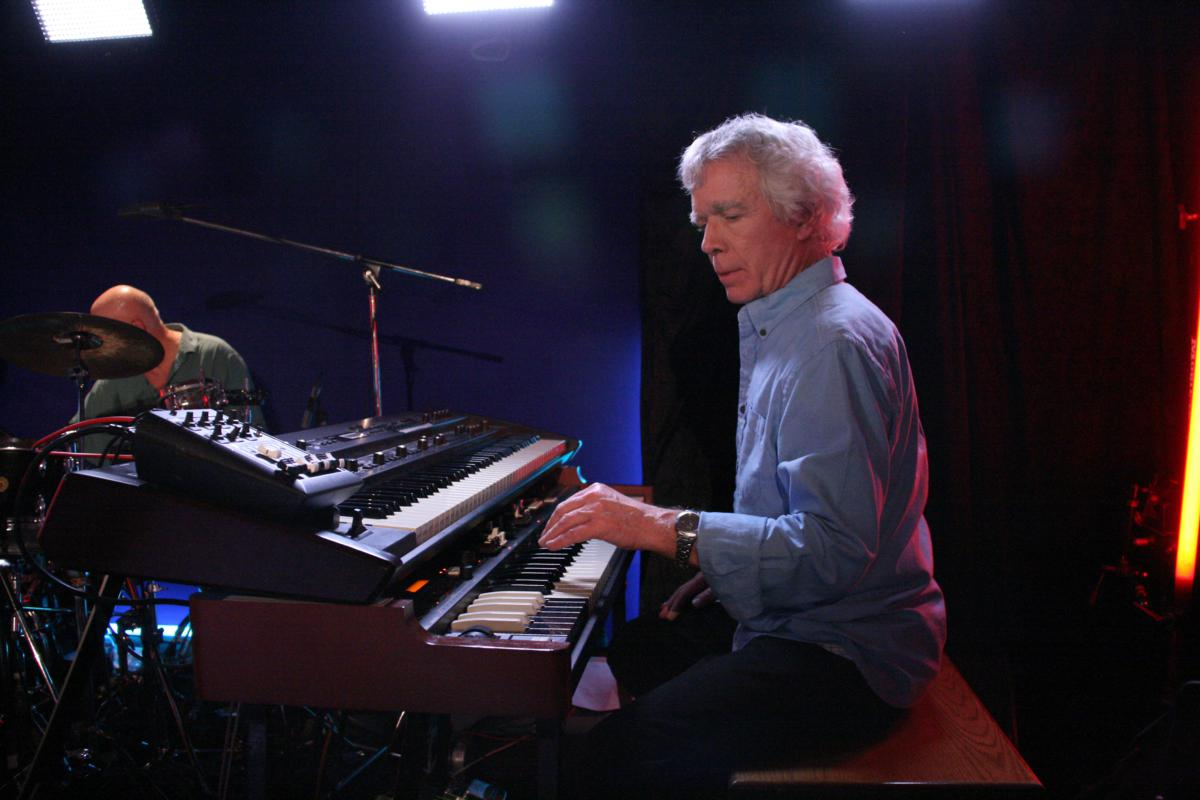
Banton

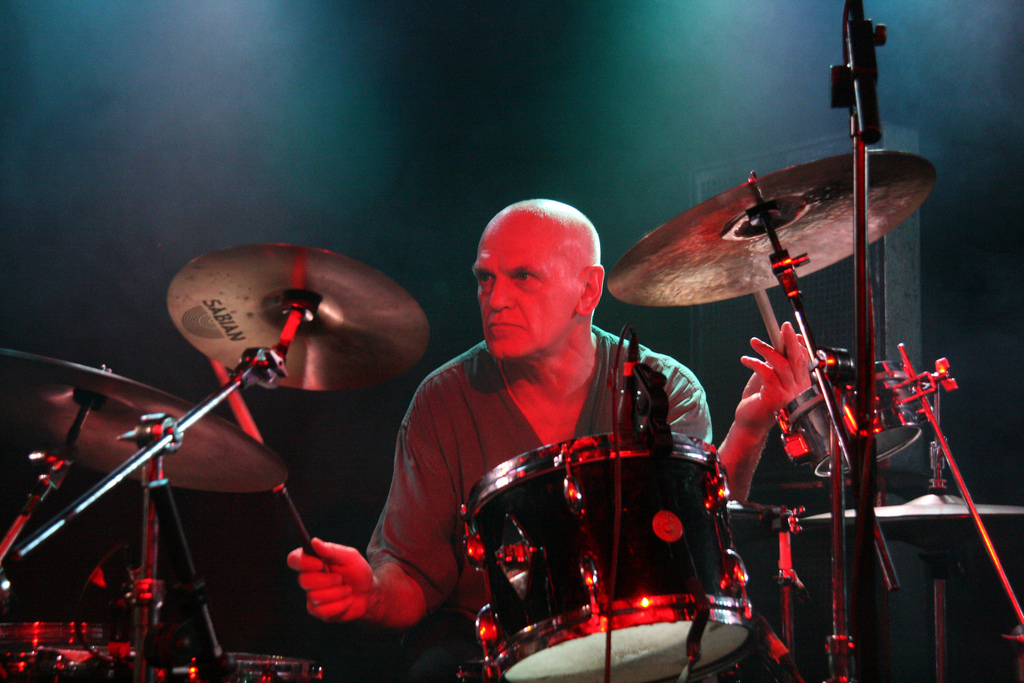
Evans

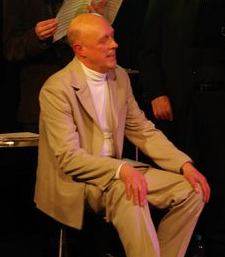
Smith

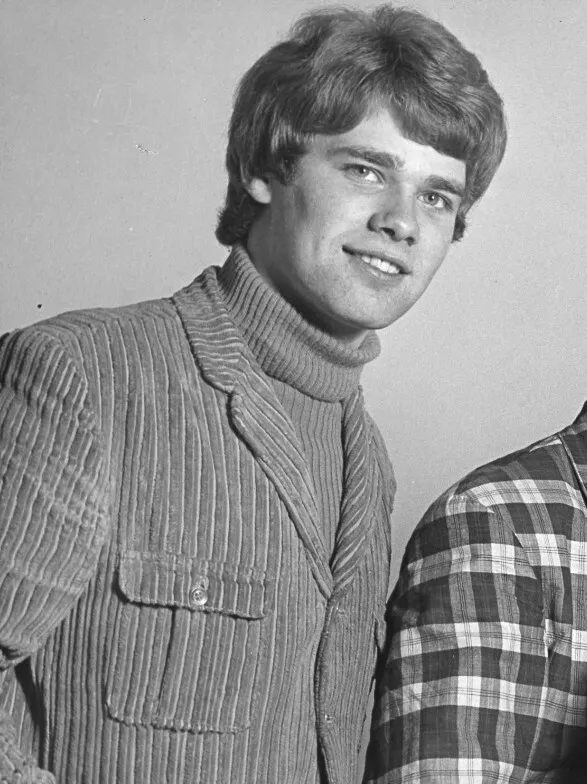
Ellis

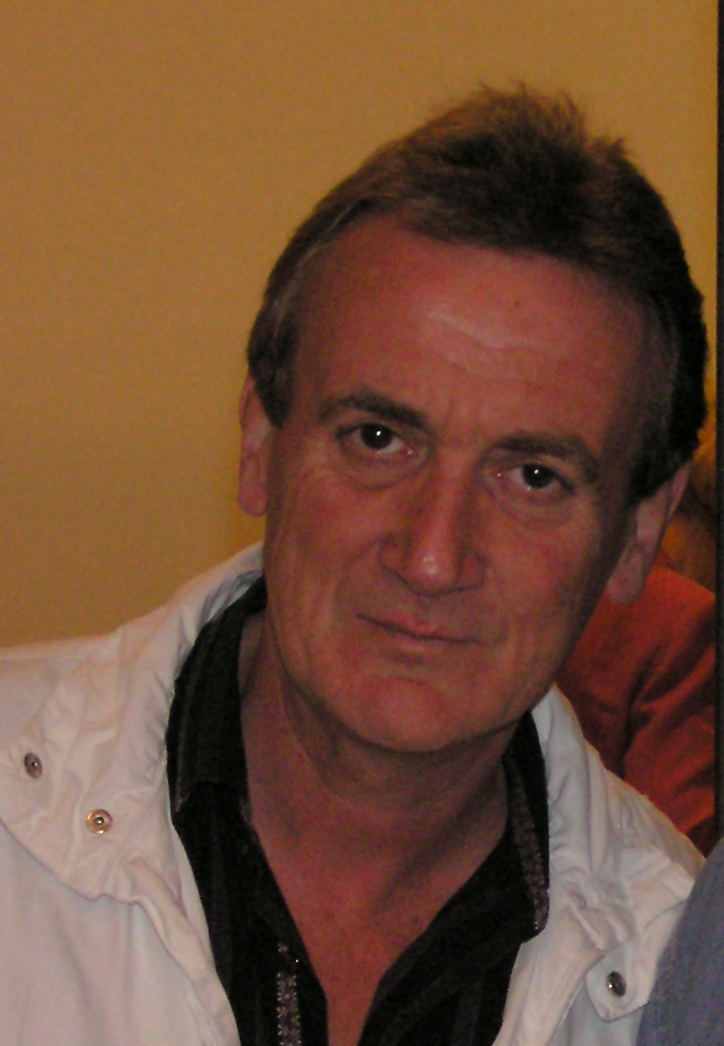
Potter

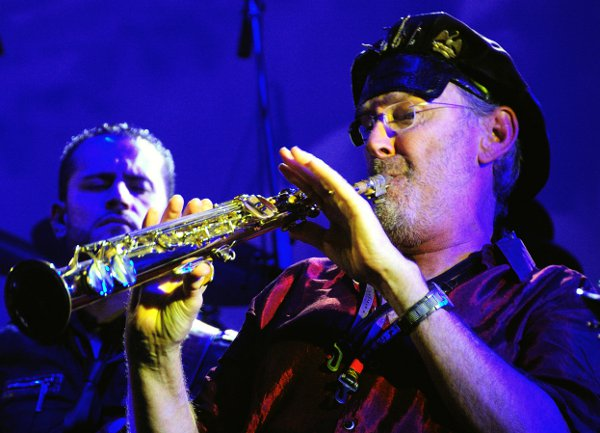
Jackson

Current members

- Peter Hammill – lead and backing vocals, guitars, electric and acoustic piano, keyboards, bass (1967–1972, 1975–1978, 2005–present)
- Hugh Banton – organ, piano, keyboards, bass pedals, bass guitar, backing vocals (1968–1972, 1975–1976, 2005–present)
- Guy Evans – drums, percussion (1968–1972, 1975–1978, 2005–present)

Former members

- Chris Judge Smith – drums, percussion, wind instruments, backing and lead vocals (1967–1968)
- Nick Pearne – organ (1967–1968)
- Keith Ellis – bass guitar (1968–1969; died 1978)
- Nic Potter – bass guitar, guitar (1969–1970, 1977–1978; died 2013)
- David Jackson – alto, tenor, baritone and soprano saxophones, flute, piano, backing vocals (1969–1972, 1975–1977, 1978 (guest for two concerts), 2005–2006)
- Graham Smith – violin (1977–1978)
- Charles Dickie – cello, piano, synthesizer (1977–1978)

=== Lineups ===
1967	1967–1968	1968	1968
Peter Hammill – guitar, piano, keyboards, vocals; Chris Judge Smith – vocals, drums, wind instruments	Peter Hammill – guitar, piano, keyboards, vocals; Chris Judge Smith – vocals, drums, wind instruments; Nick Pearne – organ	Peter Hammill – guitar, piano, keyboards, vocals; Chris Judge Smith – vocals, drums, wind instruments; Hugh Banton – organ, bass pedals, bass	Peter Hammill – guitar, piano, keyboards, vocals; Chris Judge Smith – vocals, percussion, wind instruments; Hugh Banton – organ; Keith Ellis – bass; Guy Evans – drums
1968–1969	1969–1970	1970–1972	1972–1974
Peter Hammill – guitar, piano, keyboards, vocals; Hugh Banton – organ; Keith Ellis – bass; Guy Evans – drums	Peter Hammill – guitar, piano, keyboards, vocals; Hugh Banton – organ; Guy Evans – drums; Nic Potter – bass, guitar; David Jackson – saxophone, flute	Peter Hammill – guitar, piano, keyboards, vocals; Hugh Banton – organ, bass pedals, bass; Guy Evans – drums; David Jackson – saxophone, flute	Disbanded
1975–1976	1977	1977–1978	1978–2004
Peter Hammill – guitar, piano, keyboards, vocals; Hugh Banton – organ, bass pedals, bass; Guy Evans – drums; David Jackson – saxophone, flute	Peter Hammill – guitar, piano, keyboards, vocals; Guy Evans – drums; Nic Potter – bass; Graham Smith – violin	Peter Hammill – guitar, piano, keyboards, vocals; Guy Evans – drums; Nic Potter – bass; Graham Smith – violin; Charles Dickie – cello, keyboards	Disbanded
2005–2006	2006–present
Peter Hammill – guitar, piano, keyboards, vocals; Guy Evans – drums; Hugh Banton – organ, bass pedals, bass; David Jackson – saxophone, flute	Peter Hammill – guitar, piano, keyboards, vocals; Guy Evans – drums; Hugh Banton – organ, bass pedals, bass

== Discography ==
- The Aerosol Grey Machine (1969)
- The Least We Can Do Is Wave to Each Other (1970)
- H to He, Who Am the Only One (1970)
- Pawn Hearts (1971)
- Godbluff (1975)
- Still Life (1976)
- World Record (1976)
- The Quiet Zone/The Pleasure Dome (1977)
- Present (2005)
- Trisector (2008)
- A Grounding in Numbers (2011)
- ALT (2012)
- Do Not Disturb (2016)
