= Morgen (band) =

American psychedelic rock band

- Morgen's 1969 self-titled album.

Background information
- Origin: Long Island, New York, United States
- Genres: Psychedelic rock; acid rock
- Years active: 1968–1969
- Labels: Probe, Command
- Past members: Steve Morgen; Bobby Rizzo; Mike Ratti; Barry Stock; Murray Schiffrin

Morgen was an American psychedelic rock band formed in 1967 in Long Island, New York. Their only album, Morgen, was released in 1969. The band was initially referred to as "Morgen’s Dreame Spectrum".

== Style ==
Morgen's musical style has been likened to Love, The Doors and Jimi Hendrix.

"Welcome to the Void", the first track of their self-titled album, references fairy tales and folklore, including Jack Be Nimble and Peter Pan.
