= ALT (album) =

Studio album by Van der Graaf Generator
- Released: 25 June 2012
- Recorded: 2011–2012
- Genres: Progressive rock, art rock, experimental rock, instrumental rock, free improvisation
- Length: 61:01
- Label: Esoteric Recordings
- Producer: Peter Hammill

Van der Graaf Generator chronology
A Grounding in Numbers (2011)	ALT (2012)	Merlin Atmos (2015)

Professional ratings
Review scores
Source	Rating
AllMusic	3.5/5 stars

ALT is the twelfth studio album by English progressive rock band Van der Graaf Generator. It was released 25 June 2012. There are only instrumental songs on the album.

The opening track "Earlybird" has inspired the Earlybird Project (2014-2015), a non-profit environmental art project, an appeal for the preservation of the world. This project is the result of the collaboration between the Italian-Russian artist Vladislav Shabalin, who works with fossils, and Van der Graaf Generator.

== Track listing ==
CD
No.	Title	Length
1.	"Earlybird"	4:01
2.	"Extractus"	1:39
3.	"Sackbutt"	1:54
4.	"Colossus"	6:33
5.	"Batty Loop"	1:11
6.	"Splendid"	3:46
7.	"Repeat After Me"	7:37
8.	"Elsewhere"	4:17
9.	"Here's One I Made Earlier"	5:41
10.	"Midnite Or So"	3:32
11.	"D'Accord"	2:25
12.	"Mackerel Ate Them"	4:47
13.	"Tuesday, The Riff"	2:42
14.	"Dronus"	10:37

=== Vinyl ===
Side one
No.	Title	Length
1.	"Colossus"	6:33
2.	"Repeat After Me"	7:37
3.	"Earlybird"	4:01
4.	"Elsewhere"	4:17
5.	"Loop J 2"	0:48

Side two
No.	Title	Length
6.	"D'Accord"	2:25
7.	"Mackerel Ate Them"	4:47
8.	"Here's One I Made Earlier"	5:41
9.	"Dronus"	10:37

== Personnel ==
Van der Graaf Generator

- Peter Hammill − guitars, keyboards
- Hugh Banton − organ, bass, bass pedals
- Guy Evans − drums
