= Probe Records =

- Parent company: ABC Records
- Founded: 1968
- Defunct: 1970 (US), 1974 (UK)
- Status: Defunct
- Distributors: ABC (US), EMI (international)
- Genre: Psychedelic rock, progressive rock
- Country of origin: United States
- Location: New York City
- Official website: http://bsnpubs.com/abc/probe.html

Probe Records was a sub-label of ABC Records. It was started in 1968 as their label for psychedelic rock and progressive rock, but was deactivated in 1970. Between 1970 and 1974, the label was also used for international distribution of material made by ABC and its Dunhill Records subsidiary.

== US Album Releases ==
Number - Title - Artist [Release Date] (Chart)

- CPLP 4500 - The Soft Machine - The Soft Machine [1968] (12-68, #160)
- CPLP 4501 - The Mystic Number National Bank - The Mystic Number National Bank [1969]
- CPLP 4502 - The Love Songs Of A. Wilbur Meshel - Billy Meshel [1969]
- CPLP 4503 - Guy and David - Guy & David [1969]
- CPLP 4504 - Emerge - The Litter [1969] (8-69, #175)
- CPLP 4505 - Volume Two - The Soft Machine [1969]
- CPLP 4506 - Over the Hills/Bastich - Saint Steven [1969]
- CPLP 4507 - Morgen - Morgen [1969]
- CPLP 4508 - Reincarnation - Fat City [1969]
- CPLP 4509 - Rock Slides - Scott Bradford [1969]
- CPLP 4510 - Zephyr - Zephyr [1969] (12-69, #48)
- CPLP 4511 - From Here To There - Frummox [1969]
- CPLP 4512 - White Hot Soul - Dick Jensen [1969]
- CPLP 4513 - The Seven Deadly Sins - Plus [1969]
- CPLP 4514 - Rare Bird - Rare Bird [1970] (3-70, #117) UK: Charisma CAS 1005
- CPLP 4515 - The Least We Can Do Is Wave To Each Other - Van der Graaf Generator [1970] UK: Charisma CAS 1007
- CPLP 4516 - Classical Heads - Joseph Eger [1970] UK: Charisma CAS 1008
- CPLP 4517 - I Shall Be Released - Freddie Scott [1970]

Probe's 1970-74 European logo

== See also ==
- List of record labels
