= Hugh Banton =

British musician

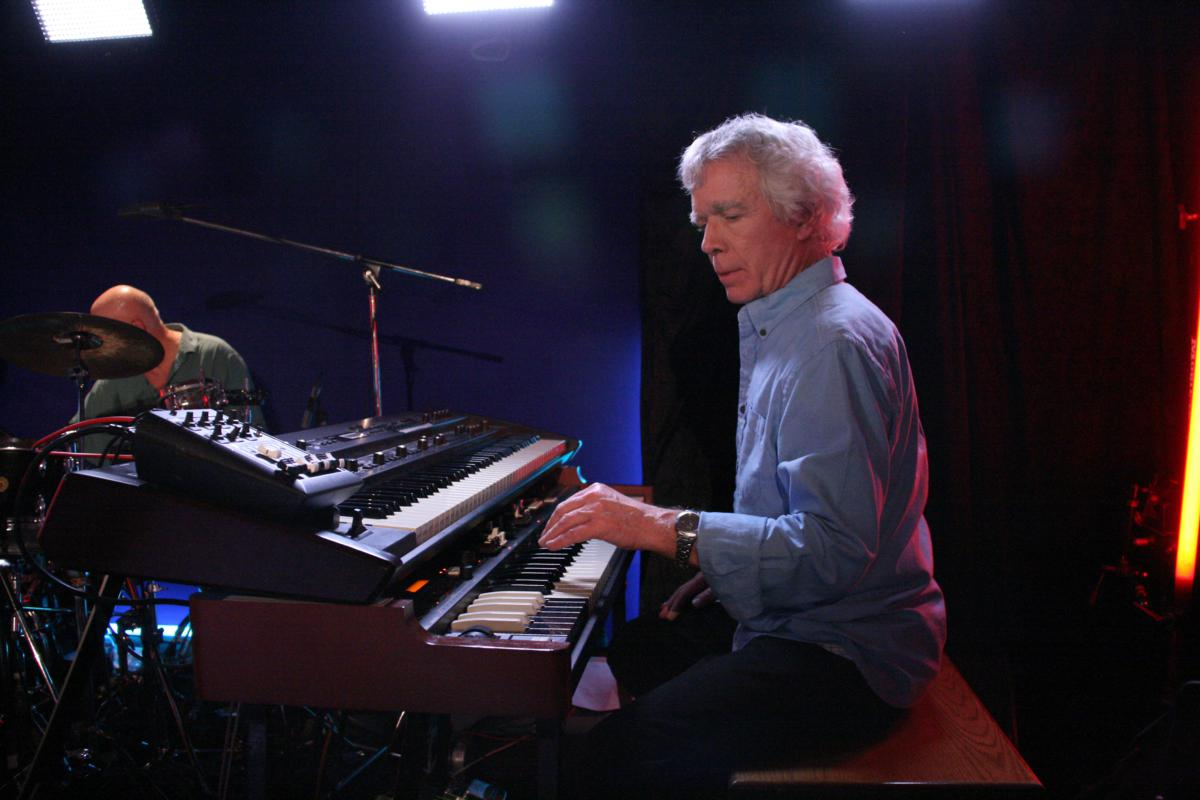
- Banton playing the organ with Van der Graaf Generator

Background information
- Born: Hugh Robert Banton; 25 April 1949 (age 77); Yeovil, Somerset, England
- Occupations: Musician, organ builder
- Instruments: Organ, keyboards, bass
- Years active: 1968–present
- Member of: Van der Graaf Generator

Hugh Robert Banton (born 25 April 1949) is a British musician and electronic organ builder, most widely known for playing organ and keyboards with the group Van der Graaf Generator.

== Career ==
Banton was born in April 1949 in Yeovil, Somerset, into a musical family. His father played the piano, his mother regularly sang along to music on the radio, and two uncles were church organists. He started playing the piano at age four, and began taking formal lessons at age seven. He was influenced by the family classical record collection and by music heard on Radio Luxembourg. In his teens he studied classical piano and organ while attending Silcoates School in Yorkshire under Dr Percy G. Saunders, the organist at Wakefield Cathedral. He continued to enjoy both rock 'n' roll and classical music.

After leaving school, he trained as a television engineer with the BBC in Evesham, and subsequently in London. He joined Van der Graaf Generator in May 1968 when the group (then consisting of just Peter Hammill and Judge Smith) moved from Manchester to London. In performance with this group he played Farfisa and Hammond organs, adding a wide range of effects including phasing, tape echo, distortion and overdrive.

In 1970 he took over the bass player role within the group, using the organ foot pedals. He also played bass guitar on recordings. He modified his Hammond E112 organ to allow separate amplification, with different effects, of the output from the two keyboards and pedalboard, and he devised a stereo reverb unit. In 1975 he began building a custom organ based on a Hammond but with added electronic oscillators to approximate a full pipe organ sound. Electronics, particularly the development of organs, have been a parallel interest since his early teens.

Banton changed career at the end of 1976 and left Van der Graaf Generator to work on the development, design and installation of electronic church organs for Makin Organs, a company in Oldham, Lancashire, where he became Technical Director. In 1992, he set up his own company, The Organ Workshop at Lymm in Cheshire, and latterly in Evesham, Worcestershire. His organs use digitally generated waveforms to emulate the sound of pipe organ stops, and a recent specialty is combining digital organ stops within conventional wind-driven pipe organs, to create a larger hybrid instrument. His company have installed organs of all sizes both in the UK and abroad. Commencing in 2017, Banton has been developing a PC software project - HB3 - which further researches the real-time production of pipe-organ sounds by digital means.

Since the reunion of Van der Graaf Generator in 2005, Hugh has regularly contributed to concerts and recordings with former members; the band has continued as a trio with Peter Hammill and Guy Evans.

== Discography ==
=== Solo ===
- The Goldberg Variations - J.S. Bach (organ) (2002)
- The Planets - Gustav Holst (organ) (2009)
- J.S. Bach - HB plays JSB on HB3 (HB3 organ system) (2019)
- 100 Up, Vol 1 - compositions from 1870-1899 (HB3 organ system) (2021)
- 100 Up, Vol 2 - compositions from 1900-1921 (HB3 organ system) (2021)

=== Van der Graaf Generator ===
- Aerosol Grey Machine (1969)
- The Least We Can Do Is Wave To Each Other (1970)
- H to He, Who Am the Only One (1970)
- Pawn Hearts (1971)
- Godbluff (1975)
- Still Life (1976)
- World Record (1976)
- Time Vaults (1982)
- Maida Vale (1994)
- An Introduction: From The Least To The Quiet Zone (2000)
- The Box (2000)
- Present (2005)
- Real Time (2007)
- Trisector (2008)
- Live At The Paradiso (2009)
- A Grounding in Numbers (2011)
- ALT (2012)
- Do Not Disturb (2016)

=== Other collaborations ===
- Fool's Mate (Peter Hammill) (1971)
- Chameleon in the Shadow of the Night (Peter Hammill) (1973)
- The Long Hello (Guy Evans, David Jackson, Nic Potter, Hugh Banton) (1973)
- The Silent Corner and the Empty Stage (Peter Hammill) (1974)
- Nadir's Big Chance (Peter Hammill) (1975)
- Psi-Fi (Seventh Wave) (1975)
- The Love Songs (Peter Hammill) (1984)
- Skin (Peter Hammill) (1985)
- Gentlemen Prefer Blues (Hugh Banton, Guy Evans, David Jackson) (1985)
- Everyone You Hold (Peter Hammill) (1997)
- The Union Chapel Concert (Guy Evans, Peter Hammill) (1997)
- Curly's Airships (Judge Smith) (2000)
