= John Anthony (music producer) =

English music producer

John Anthony (born 3 December 1944) is an English music producer. He has worked with Van der Graaf Generator, Genesis, Queen, Roxy Music and Peter Hammill.

== Career ==
Anthony was born in North Shields, then in Northumberland now in North Tyneside. He started out in 1966 as a DJ in Windsor, Berkshire, where two years later he sang briefly with two bands: the Soul Agents, and Hogsnort Rupert and the Good Good Band. After moving to London, he worked as a club DJ at The Roundhouse, the UFO Club, and Middle Earth, and then in 1968 at the Speakeasy. After having produced and recorded a demonstration disc for Yes in 1968, he started his years as a music producer, eventually producing all the acts in the 1971 "Six Bob Tour", featuring Genesis, Lindisfarne, and Van der Graaf Generator. He had a saying for producing music: "There's one right way to do an album, and four hundred wrong ones."

In 1969 as an artists and repertoire (A&R) man for Mercury Records in London, Anthony was asked by Lou Reizner to produce an album by Van der Graaf Generator. Tony Stratton Smith, the manager of Van der Graaf Generator, was so impressed with the resulting The Aerosol Grey Machine that he hired Anthony as an A&R man and staff producer at the newly formed Charisma Records. In late 1971 Anthony formed Neptune Productions, his own production company with the owners of Trident Studios and signed Queen the following spring.

Anthony moved to the US in 1975 and became head of A&R at A&M Records in New York.

== Credits ==
Release date	Artist	Album title
September 1969	Van der Graaf Generator	The Aerosol Grey Machine
late 1969	Rare Bird	Rare Bird
February 1970	Van der Graaf Generator	The Least We Can Do Is Wave to Each Other
Spring 1970	Affinity	Affinity
23 October 1970	Genesis	Trespass
November 1970	Lindisfarne	Nicely Out of Tune
December 1970	Van der Graaf Generator	H to He, Who Am the Only One
1971	Colin Scot	Colin Scot
July 1971	Peter Hammill	Fool's Mate
October 1971	Van der Graaf Generator	Pawn Hearts
12 November 1971	Genesis	Nursery Cryme
1972	Home	Home
1 January 1972	Al Stewart	Orange
1973	Home	The Alchemist
24 March 1973	Roxy Music	For Your Pleasure
May 1973	Peter Hammill	Chameleon in the Shadow of the Night
13 July 1973	Queen	Queen
1974	Ace	Five-A-Side
1974	A Foot in Coldwater	All Around Us
1974	Al Stewart	Past, Present, and Future
1974	Headstone	Bad Habit
1975	Headstone	Headstone
1976	Piper	Piper
Spring 1976	Arrogance	Rumors
1977	The Tubes	Now
November 1977	Roxy Music	Greatest Hits
29 November 2004	Genesis	Platinum Collection
2008	Queen	Queen: The Singles Collection Volume 1
10 November 2008	Genesis	Genesis 1970–1975

== Bibliography ==
- Bronson, Paul (2003). The Billboard Book of Number One Hits, 5th ed. Billboard Books.
- Christopulos, J., & Smart, P. (2005). Van der Graaf Generator, The Book: A History of the Band Van der Graaf Generator 1967 to 1978. Phil and Jim Publishers.
- Frith, Simon (1981). Sound Effects: Youth, Leisure, and the Politics of Rock 'n' Roll. Pantheon Books.
- Thompson, Dave (2004). Turn It On Again: Peter Gabriel, Phil Collins & Genesis. Hal Leonard Corporation.
