= A Grounding in Numbers =

Studio album by Van der Graaf Generator
- Released: 14 March 2011
- Recorded: 3–9 April 2010
- Studio: Propagation House, Holsworthy, Devon, UK
- Genre: Progressive rock, math rock, electronic rock
- Length: 48:50
- Label: Esoteric Recordings
- Producer: Van der Graaf Generator

Van der Graaf Generator chronology
Trisector (2008)	A Grounding in Numbers (2011)	ALT (2012)

Professional ratings
Review scores
Source	Rating
Classic Rock	8/10 stars
Mojo	4/5 stars
Sunday Times	3/5 stars
Uncut	3/5 stars

A Grounding in Numbers is the eleventh studio album by the British rock group Van der Graaf Generator. Released on 14 March 2011, the date, if written as 3,14, comprises the first three digits of the number π. The second track, "Mathematics" refers to Euler's identity, sometimes known as the mathematical poem. The album's release signals a continuation in the direction set by the current trio lineup, but it is released on a new label, Esoteric Recordings, a departure from previous releases on Virgin/Charisma. Hugh Padgham is the mixer of the album.

== Background ==
Preparations for the work on the new album began in late 2008 and early 2009, when the band members started gathering song fragments and exchanging "ideas, theories, policies and directions". In April 2010 the band met up for intensive sessions in Cornwall where the whole album was arranged, rehearsed and recorded in the course of one week. Over the next months, the tracks were overdubbed, edited and adapted by the band members (who were continuing to exchange files over the internet or on CD-R) in their own studios. By September 2010, the material was ready to be mixed, and at that point Hugh Padgham was approached. After three weeks in his London studio, Sofasound, the album was completed.

== Track listing ==
All songs by Hugh Banton, Guy Evans and Peter Hammill.

No.	Title	Length
1.	"Your Time Starts Now"	4:13
2.	"Mathematics"	3:37
3.	"Highly Strung"	3:37
4.	"Red Baron"	2:24
5.	"Bunsho"	5:03
6.	"Snake Oil"	5:20
7.	"Splink"	2:37
8.	"Embarrassing Kid"	3:07
9.	"Medusa"	2:12
10.	"Mr. Sands"	5:23
11.	"Smoke"	2:30
12.	"5533"	2:42
13.	"All Over The Place"	6:01

== Personnel ==
Van der Graaf Generator

- Peter Hammill – voice, piano, electric guitar (and Ashbory bass on "Splink")
- Hugh Banton – organs (including bass pedals), bass guitar (and harpsichord, piano, glockenspiel, 10 string bass, guitar on "Smoke")
- Guy Evans – drums, percussion (and guitar on "5533")

== Charts ==
Chart (2011)	Peak position
Dutch Albums (Album Top 100)	81
UK Independent Albums (OCC)	13
