= The Least We Can Do Is Wave to Each Other =

Studio album by Van der Graaf Generator
- Released: February 1970
- Recorded: 11–14 December 1969
- Studio: Trident, London
- Genre: Progressive rock
- Length: 43:50
- Label: Charisma (UK); Probe (US)
- Producer: John Anthony

Van der Graaf Generator chronology
The Aerosol Grey Machine (1969)	The Least We Can Do Is Wave to Each Other (1970)	H to He, Who Am the Only One (1970)

The Least We Can Do Is Wave to Each Other is the second album by the British progressive rock band Van der Graaf Generator, released in February 1970 on Charisma Records. It was the group's first album to be released in the UK and their only one to chart in the top 50 in that country.

The songs on the album were mostly composed by group leader Peter Hammill but arranged and rehearsed by the whole band. The lyrics covered a variety of themes including relationships with friends, witchcraft and apocalyptic catastrophes, while the music ranged from ballads such as "Refugees" to unusual and aggressive playing on "White Hammer" and "After the Flood". In addition to having brief commercial success, the album was well received by critics and continues to be praised.

== Background ==
After the Flood
"One of the scariest moments in the history of British prog rock."

Although this is the second album in the Van der Graaf Generator catalogue, it was the first to be released in the UK, and the band considered it their first proper album. The earlier The Aerosol Grey Machine (September 1969) had been written and recorded as a solo record by singer and main songwriter Peter Hammill for Mercury Records. Through a deal worked out by manager Tony Stratton Smith, the album was released under the Van der Graaf Generator name in exchange for a release from the group's contract.

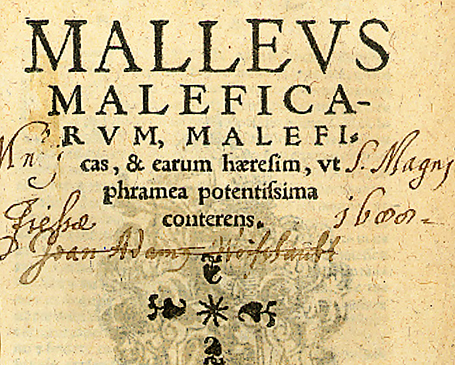
The song "White Hammer" was written about the Malleus Maleficarum, documenting mediaeval witchcraft.

The group began rehearsals for a new album in September 1969, practicing every day. Hammill wrote most of the songs and presented them to the band as finished pieces he could play along to, but arrangements were worked out by everyone in the group, particularly organist Hugh Banton and new member, saxophonist David Jackson, and the whole group improvised several pieces together. Banton had a background as a church organist, and he found his enthusiasm for modern French classic music combined well with Hammill's songwriting.

"Darkness (11/11)" got its title from being written on 11 November 1968, and was the first piece to feature Jackson's Roland Kirk influenced double horn section, playing alto and tenor saxophone simultaneously. "Refugees" was written by Hammill for ex-flatmates Mike McLean and Susan Penhaligon, while "White Hammer" was about the Malleus Maleficarum and witchcraft in the Middle Ages. "Whatever Would Robert Have Said?" referred to Robert J. Van de Graaff, the inventor of the Van de Graaff generator that the group took their name from. Jackson wrote the music to "Out of My Book" on piano, which was completed by Hammill on guitar.

The final track, "After the Flood" was a science fiction number that showed the fallout of an apocalyptic flood, and featured a twelve tone figure arranged by Jackson and a variety of different mood and style changes. The lyrics partially quoted Albert Einstein expressing his concern about the arms race between the US and the Soviet Union that led to the Cold War. (Note: The lyrics are slightly different. Einstein wrote "more and more clearly general annihilation", Hammill sung "more and more clearly total annihilation".)

"Boat of Millions of Years", a recording from the sessions which was released as a non-album B-side, draws on Egyptian mythology with lyrics that tell of a conflict between the gods Horus, Osiris, and Set.

== Recording ==
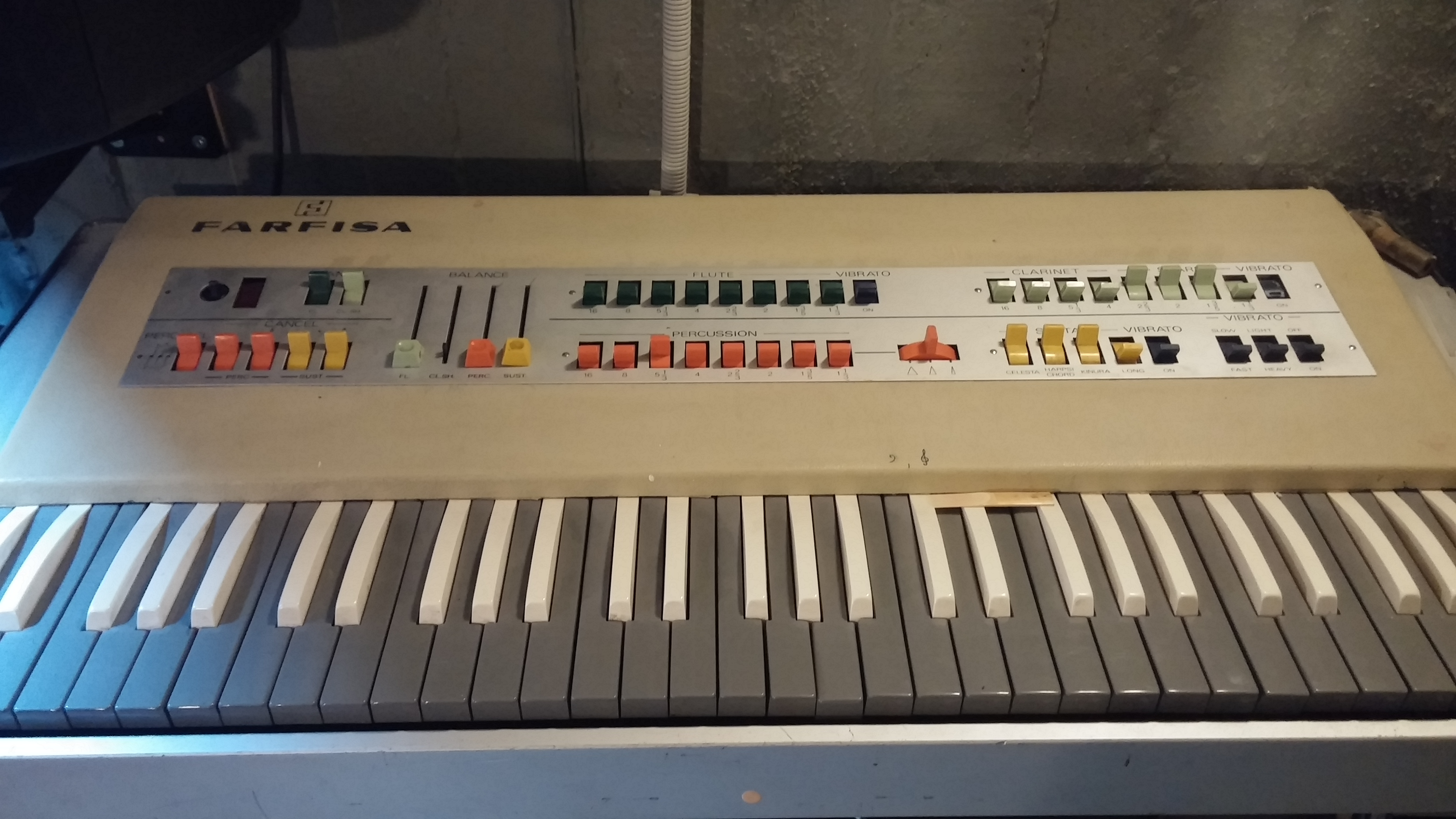
A Farfisa Professional organ, similar to the one Hugh Banton used on the album.

Tony Stratton Smith founded Charisma Records in late 1969, signing Van der Graaf Generator as one of its first acts. The album was recorded over four days at Trident Studios, London, from 11 to 14 December 1969 with producer John Anthony. Smith kept a "hands-off" approach to recording, allowing the band artistic freedom. Drummer Guy Evans recalled that Anthony was "a very good organiser" who recognised Hammill's intelligence and artistic capabilities. Trident had some of the most advanced studio equipment at the time; most of the album was recorded on an 8-track reel-to-reel machine, except for "After the Flood", which used a 16-track.

Anthony added sound effects from the BBC sound library at the start of "Darkness" and fed Hammill's voice through tremolo and distortion boxes for a section of "After the Flood". Mike Hurwitz played cello on "Refugees". Banton was credited writing the part, but not given an actual songwriting credit. He also arranged a nine-piece orchestra for a re-recording of the track that was later released as a single. Gerry Salisbury played cornet on "White Hammer". The band was well rehearsed and completed recording quickly, allowing bassist Nic Potter time to overdub electric guitar onto some tracks.

== Release ==
The album was released in the UK in February 1970. Stratton Smith was unhappy with Anthony's production and asked Shel Talmy to remix it. The first pressing of the album was released with Talmy's mix, but the band were unhappy and convinced Charisma to allow Anthony to remix it, which appeared on all subsequent releases. The sleeve dedicated the album to "L & M, without whom everyone would have been much happier", a criticism of Lou Reizner and Mercury Records. The first US issue of the album was released by the Probe Records division of ABC Records, also in 1970. It featured a different cover than the U.K. version.

The title is taken from artist John Minton: "We're all awash in a sea of blood, and the least we can do is wave to each other."

To promote the album, the group played "Darkness (11/11)" and "After the Flood" on a session for BBC Radio 1. These recordings were later released on the box set The Box. In April 1970, the group performed "Darkness" and "Whatever Would Robert Have Said?" for the German television show Beat Club, with Jethro Tull appearing on the same show.

== Reception ==
Professional ratings
Review scores
Source	Rating
AllMusic	4/5 stars

The album was the first (and only) by the band to reach the top 50 in the UK. Critical reception was favourable; a review in International Times said the album was the best debut since King Crimson's In the Court of the Crimson King, while a reviewer in Time Out said it was "the strongest thing I've heard in a long time".

In the Q and Mojo Classic Special Edition Pink Floyd & The Story of Prog Rock, the album came #15 in its list of "40 Cosmic Rock Albums".

François Couture, reviewing the album in AllMusic, described Hammill's distorted delivery of the word "Annihilation" in "After the Flood" to be "one of the scariest moments in the history of British prog rock". In his 1997 History of Progressive Rock, Paul Stump assessed that while the album is harmonically and structurally similar to contemporary progressive rock works by Genesis and Yes, it does contain hints of the more unique work Van der Graaf Generator would later produce, particularly Jackson's "snaggling, niggling Coltrane-ish saxophone". Jackson decided not to play "White Hammer" to a friend while his children were present, afraid they would be frightened by the music.

== Track listing ==
All songs written by Peter Hammill, except as noted. (Published by Stratsong Ltd.)

Side one
No.	Title	Length
1.	"Darkness (11/11)"	7:28
2.	"Refugees"	6:23
3.	"White Hammer"	8:15

Side two
No.	Title	Writer(s)	Length
4.	"Whatever Would Robert Have Said?"		6:07
5.	"Out of My Book"	Hammill, David Jackson	4:08
6.	"After the Flood"		11:27

Bonus tracks on reissue , originally the B- and A-sides of an April 1970 single
No.	Title	Length
7.	"Boat of Millions of Years"	3:50
8.	"Refugees"	5:24

== Personnel ==
Van der Graaf Generator

- Peter Hammill – acoustic guitar and lead vocals; piano on "Refugees"
- David Jackson – tenor and alto saxophone, flute and backing vocals
- Hugh Banton – organ, piano and backing vocals
- Nic Potter – bass guitar and electric guitar
- Guy Evans – drums and percussion

Additional musicians

- Mike Hurwitz – cello on "Refugees"
- Gerry Salisbury – cornet on "White Hammer"

Production

- Van der Graaf Generator – arrangements
- John Anthony – producer
- Robin Geoffrey Cable – recording and engineering

== Charts ==
Chart (1970–1972)	Peak position
Italian Albums (Musica e Dischi)	15
UK Albums (OCC)	47

Chart (2022)	Peak position
Scottish Albums (OCC)	96
