= Time Vaults =

Demo album by Van der Graaf Generator
- Released: 1982
- Recorded: Crowborough 1971, Ross-on-Wye 1972, Rockfield 1973/1974 and Norton Canon 1975
- Genre: Progressive rock
- Length: 45:18
- Label: Sofa Sound (original cassette release SS3)

Van der Graaf Generator chronology
Vital (1978)	Time Vaults (1982)	Maida Vale (1994)

Professional ratings
Review scores
Source	Rating
Allmusic	2/5 stars

Time Vaults is an album by Van der Graaf Generator. It was originally released in 1982 on cassette only, almost four years after the break-up of Van der Graaf Generator in 1978. In May 1985 it was released as a vinyl LP, and in 1992 it was released on CD.

The album contains outtakes and rehearsals from the period 1972-1975, when the band was on hiatus. The recordings "are not studio-quality recordings", according to Peter Hammill. It contains previously unreleased songs taken from rehearsals by the reformed band in 1975, plus a few live numbers from mid-1972, originally intended for a projected album in late 1972.

"Coil Night" features Peter Hammill on bass guitar and David Jackson on piano. The title track "Time Vaults" is a collage consisting of several unreleased pieces mixed with studio chatter. A different version of "Black Room" appeared on Peter Hammill's solo album Chameleon in the Shadow of the Night. "Faint and Forsaken" is a combination of the instrumental middle passages of "Forsaken Gardens" and "Faint-Heart and the Sermon", different versions of which appeared on Peter Hammill's solo albums The Silent Corner and the Empty Stage and In Camera respectively.

== Track listing ==
Side one
No.	Title	Writer(s)	Length
1.	"The Liquidator"	Peter Hammill	5:24
2.	"Rift Valley"	Hammill, David Jackson, Guy Evans	4:40
3.	"Tarzan"	Hammill, Jackson, Evans, Banton	2:09
4.	"Coil Night"	Jackson	4:12
5.	"Time Vaults"		3:33
6.	"Drift (I Hope It Won't)"	Hugh Banton	2:40

Side two
No.	Title	Writer(s)	Length
7.	"Roncevaux"	Hammill	6:55
8.	"It All Went Red"	Hammill, Jackson, Evans	4:07
9.	"Faint And Forsaken"	Hammill	2:45
10.	"Black Room"	Hammill	8:52

== Personnel ==
Van der Graaf Generator

- Peter Hammill – vocals, guitar, piano, bass (except 6)
- David Jackson – saxophone, piano
- Hugh Banton – organ, bass (except 2, 4, 8)
- Guy Evans – drums
