= The Aerosol Grey Machine =

Studio album by Van der Graaf Generator
- Released: September 1969 (US)
- Recorded: January 1969; 31 July – 1 August 1969
- Studios: Marquee and Trident Studios, London, England
- Genres: Progressive rock; psychedelic rock
- Length: 46:58
- Labels: Mercury (USA), Fontana (Germany), Vertigo (Italy & Netherlands)
- Producer: John Anthony

Van der Graaf Generator chronology
The Aerosol Grey Machine (1969)	The Least We Can Do Is Wave to Each Other (1970)

The Aerosol Grey Machine is the debut studio album by English progressive rock band Van der Graaf Generator. It was first released in the United States in 1969 by Mercury Records.

== Content ==
The album was originally intended as a solo album by the band's lead singer and main songwriter, Peter Hammill. When the band signed with Charisma Records, a deal was worked out whereby The Aerosol Grey Machine would be released under the Van der Graaf Generator name, in return for Mercury releasing Hammill from his earlier contract.

== Releases ==
The Aerosol Grey Machine was released in September 1969 by Mercury, in the US only. An initial edition contained the song "Giant Squid" instead of "Necromancer", but that was a mis-print which was corrected immediately. On the sleeve and on the LP label of the misprint only "Necromancer" is named, but the song is mentioned in the song album credits though, which makes it very likely that initially the LP should feature it. The LP was released in June 1974 by Fontana Records in Germany and by Vertigo in some other European countries. The first UK release was in February 1975 also by Fontana.

The album was reissued on CD in 1997 by Repertoire Records in Germany, using the original running order of the album as released on LP, and featuring the first single as bonus tracks.

In the same year Peter Hammill's own UK record label FIE! Records also released the album, but in a different edition. The Fie CD uses a slightly different running order and adds "Giant Squid" along with a previously unreleased early version of "Ferret and Featherbird" as part of the album, and not as bonus tracks at the end of the CD. For this release Hammill also united both parts of "Orthenthian Street" into one song by an initially intended cross fade.

== Reception ==
Professional ratings
Review scores
Source	Rating
AllMusic	3/5 stars

In his retrospective review, Steven McDonald of AllMusic called it "A raw, energetic effort that sometimes did little to show off the young Hammill's talents" that "nevertheless has some fine moments that hint at the possibilities for future releases". Paul Stump, in his 1997 History of Progressive Rock, commented that the album "said little unsaid elsewhere at the time; it was poetically skewed pop, arcanely arranged and cautiously extended."

== Track listing ==
All tracks are written by Peter Hammill, except as indicated.

Side A
No.	Title	Writer(s)	Length
1.	"Afterwards"		4:55
2.	"Orthenthian St (Parts I & II)"		6:18
3.	"Running Back"		6:35
4.	"Into a Game"	Hammill, Hugh Banton, Keith Ellis, Guy Evans	6:57

Side B
No.	Title	Writer(s)	Length
1.	"Aerosol Grey Machine"		0:47
2.	"Black Smoke Yen"	Banton, Ellis, Evans	1:26
3.	"Aquarian"		8:22
4.	"Necromancer"		3:30
5.	"Octopus"		8:00

1997 German CD bonus tracks
No.	Title	Length
10.	"People You Were Going To"	2:44
11.	"Firebrand"	4:08

1997 FIE! CD
No.	Title	Writer(s)	Length
1.	"Afterwards"		4:58
2.	"Orthenthian St"		6:19
3.	"Running Back"		6:36
4.	"Into a Game"	Hammill, Hugh Banton, Keith Ellis, Guy Evans	6:57
5.	"Ferret & Featherbird"		4:34
6.	"Aerosol Grey Machine"		0:46
7.	"Black Smoke Yen"	Banton, Ellis, Evans	1:27
8.	"Aquarian"		8:21
9.	"Giant Squid"	Hammill, Banton, Ellis, Evans	3:19
10.	"Octopus"		7:57
11.	"Necromancer"		3:30

== Personnel ==
Van der Graaf Generator

- Peter Hammill – lead vocals, acoustic guitar
- Hugh Banton – Farfisa organ, piano, percussion, backing vocals, electric guitar on "Firebrand"
- Keith Ellis – bass guitar, backing vocals
- Guy Evans – drums, percussion

Additional personnel

- Jeff Peach – flute on "Running Back" and "Ferret & Featherbird"
- Chris Judge Smith (only on bonus tracks) – slide-saxophone and harmony vocals on "People You Were Going To", co-lead vocals on "Firebrand"

== Charts ==
Chart (2019)	Peak position
UK Independent Albums (Official Charts)	48
UK Rock & Metal Albums (Official Charts)	9
