= Trisector =

Studio album by Van der Graaf Generator
- Released: 17 March 2008
- Recorded: 2–13 July 2007
- Studio: The Gaia Centre, Delabole, Cornwall
- Genre: Progressive rock, art rock
- Length: 53:45
- Label: Virgin/EMI
- Producer: VdGG

Van der Graaf Generator chronology
Real Time (2007)	Trisector (2008)	A Grounding in Numbers (2011)

Professional ratings
Review scores
Source	Rating
AllMusic	3.5/5.0 stars
Classic Rock	7/10 stars
Mojo	3/5 stars
Uncut	4/5 stars

Trisector is the tenth studio album by the British rock group Van der Graaf Generator. It was released on Virgin/EMI Records in March 2008. It is the first album the band has recorded as a trio. Saxophonist David Jackson departed the band following the 2005 tour.

== Track listing ==
All songs by Hugh Banton, Guy Evans and Peter Hammill except where noted.

No.	Title	Length
1.	"The Hurlyburly"	4:38
2.	"Interference Patterns"	3:50
3.	"The Final Reel"	5:47
4.	"Lifetime"	4:45
5.	"Drop Dead"	4:47
6.	"Only In A Whisper"	6:44
7.	"All That Before"	6:26
8.	"Over The Hill"	12:26
9.	"(We Are) Not Here"	4:06

== Personnel ==
Van der Graaf Generator

- Peter Hammill – voice, piano, electric guitar
- Hugh Banton – organs (including bass pedals), bass guitar
- Guy Evans – drums, percussion

== Charts ==
Chart (2008)	Peak position
Italian Albums (FIMI)	83
