= Godbluff =

Studio album by Van der Graaf Generator
- Released: October 1975
- Recorded: 9–29 June 1975
- Studio: Rockfield Studios, Monmouthshire
- Genre: Progressive rock
- Length: 37:44
- Label: UK Charisma Records; USA Mercury Records
- Producer: Van der Graaf Generator

Van der Graaf Generator chronology
Pawn Hearts (1971)	Godbluff (1975)	Still Life (1976)

Godbluff is the fifth album released by English progressive rock band Van der Graaf Generator, released in October 1975 via Charisma-Mercury. It was the first album after the band reformed in 1975 and was recorded after a European tour.

As the first self-produced album by the band, it featured a tighter, more pared-down sound than the band's earlier recordings with producer John Anthony. Hammill said "we did not want to make 'Son of Pawn Hearts' with a big long side two and lots of studio experiments". Van der Graaf Generator would never work with an outside producer from this point forward. Hammill made extensive use of the Hohner Clavinet D6 keyboard, which he had first started using on his previous solo album, Nadir's Big Chance (1975).

The first release of the record in the United States was on Mercury Records. The 2005 reissue added live performances by the band of two songs from Peter Hammill's album The Silent Corner and the Empty Stage (1974), recorded at a concert at L'Altro Mondo, Rimini, Italy.

== Artwork ==
Godbluff's album cover was minimal, consisting of a band logo and "stamped" red album title on an otherwise black sleeve. The band logo that first appeared here was designed by John Pasche; it would also be used on the next two albums, Still Life (April 1976) and World Record (October 1976).

== Reception ==
Professional ratings
Review scores
Source	Rating
AllMusic	4/5 stars
Christgau's Record Guide	D+

Sleepwalkers Sample
An audio sample of "Sleepwalkers", written by Peter Hammill, (1975)

In Melody Maker, the reviewer said that "in a very real sense, [Godbluff] is the sound of the mid-seventies: uncomfortable, coherent, unremitting, courageous". Geoff Barton of Sounds deemed Godbluff "simply, an essential buy". A negative review appeared in the Lancashire Evening Post in November 1975, in which Bob Papworth wrote that the album contained "the type of studiously avant-garde rock which so many other groups play infinitely better". Papworth added that "Guy Evans couldn't drum his way out of a paper bag and David Jackson's saxes and flutes are a little too simplistic to be credible."

In a May 2002 review in Mojo magazine, Julian Cope praised the album. A retrospective review in 2011 by AllMusic's Steve McDonald wrote: "Godbluff was a bravura comeback – only four cuts, but all were classics."

== Track listing ==
All tracks written by Peter Hammill, except "Scorched Earth" by Hammill and David Jackson.

Side one
No.	Title	Length
1.	"The Undercover Man"	7:32
2.	"Scorched Earth"	9:44

Side two
No.	Title	Length
3.	"Arrow"	9:48
4.	"The Sleepwalkers"	10:40

2005 CD bonus tracks - Recorded live at L'Altro Mondo, Rimini, Italy on 9 August 1975
No.	Title	Length
5.	"Forsaken Gardens"	12:23
6.	"A Louse Is Not a Home"	10:26

== Personnel ==
Van der Graaf Generator

- Peter Hammill – vocals, piano, clavinet, electric guitar
- David Jackson – saxophones and flute
- Hugh Banton – Hammond organ (including bass pedals), bass guitar
- Guy Evans – drums and percussion

Technical

- Produced by Van der Graaf Generator
- Engineered by Pat Moran
- Cut by George Peckham at The Master Room

== Charts ==
Chart (2022)	Peak position
Scottish Albums (OCC)	77
UK Rock & Metal Albums (OCC)	23
