= Still Life (Van der Graaf Generator album) =

Studio album by Van der Graaf Generator
- Released: 16 April 1976
- Recorded: 12–25 January 1976 (except "Pilgrims" and "La Rossa": June 1975 during Godbluff sessions)
- Studios: Rockfield (Rockfield, Wales)
- Genre: Progressive rock
- Length: 44:57
- Labels: UK Charisma Records; USA Mercury Records
- Producer: Van der Graaf Generator

Van der Graaf Generator chronology
Godbluff (1975)	Still Life (1976)	World Record (1976)

Professional ratings
Review scores
Source	Rating
AllMusic	4/5 stars

Still Life is the sixth album by English progressive rock band Van der Graaf Generator, originally released in April 1976. It was their second album after reforming in 1975, the first being Godbluff. One live bonus track was added for the 2005 re-mastered re-release. A new remaster, along with new Stereo and 5.1 surround sound remixes by Stephen W Tayler, was released on 3 September 2021.

== Cover ==
The album front cover, photographed by Paul Brierley, shows a Lichtenberg figure. The image was described by journalist Geoff Barton in Sounds: "It's actually a frozen-in-action shot of an electrical discharge from a real Van de Graaff generator machine, set in acrylic."

== Response ==
Geoff Barton of Sounds wrote: "Where 'Still Life' scores over past LPs is in its precise and accurate reproduction of leader Hammill's vocals. He never really sings, rather he murmurs, shouts, screams or speaks, and this wide range of tonality has presented in the past often insurmountable problems for engineers, technicians and suchlike. Here, however, every subtle nuance of the 'chords has been captured successfully, providing greater variation, an abundance of light and shade. ... 'Still Life' is an essential album. If you think you have problems, listen to Hammill's and you'll probably never be able to worry about anything insignificant ever again."

Jonathan Barnett of New Musical Express, describing the songs on the album, wrote: "They start off with the kind of morbid over-sensibility, y'know ... smart ass existentialist one-liners like that, accompanied by furtive, lurching manic melodies that emphasise the personality disorientation of the whole thing."

Steven McDonald, for AllMusic, notes that Hammill songs take "... a dead run at a grandiose concept or two – the consequences of immortality on the title track, and the grand fate of humanity on the epic "Childlike Faith in Childhood's End." McDonald concludes: "The true highlight, however, is the beautiful, pensive "My Room (Waiting for Wonderland)", with its echoes of imagination and loss. Hammill did not achieve such a level of painful beauty again until "This Side of the Looking Glass" on Over."

Interviewed by Mojo in 2002, Hugh Banton said: "I remember doing Still Life, which is possibly my favourite Van der Graaf album of all, and Charisma came along and said 'Oh, this is just a stop-gap album'. The stop-gap album!? We don't make stop-gap albums!"

== Track listing ==
All songs written by Peter Hammill, except "Pilgrims" by Hammill and David Jackson.

Side one
No.	Title	Length
1.	"Pilgrims"	7:12
2.	"Still Life"	7:25
3.	"La Rossa"	9:53

Side two
No.	Title	Length
4.	"My Room (Waiting for Wonderland)"	8:03
5.	"Childlike Faith in Childhood's End"	12:24

2005 CD bonus track - Recorded live at Theatr Gwynedd, Bangor, Wales, on 10 May 1975
No.	Title	Length
6.	"Gog"	10:26

My Room Sample
An audio sample of "My Room (Waiting for Wonderland)", written by Peter Hammill, 1976)

== Personnel ==
=== Musicians ===
- Peter Hammill – vocals, guitar, piano
- David Jackson – tenor and soprano saxophones, flute
- Hugh Banton – Hammond organ, bass, Mellotron, piano
- Guy Evans – drums, percussion

=== Technical ===
- Pat Moran – engineer, mixing
- Arun – lacquer cut
- Mike Van der Vord – photography (back cover)
- Paul Brierley – photography (front cover)
