= Pawn Hearts =

Studio album by Van der Graaf Generator
- Released: 12 November 1971
- Recorded: July–September 1971
- Studios: Trident, London
- Genre: Progressive rock
- Length: 45:08 (original release); 48:03 (US/Canada release)
- Label: Charisma
- Producer: John Anthony

Van der Graaf Generator chronology
H to He, Who Am the Only One (1970)	Pawn Hearts (1971)	Godbluff (1975)

Audio sample
- "Man-Erg": file; help

Pawn Hearts is the fourth album by English progressive rock band Van der Graaf Generator, released on 12 November 1971 on Charisma Records. The original album features just three tracks, including the side-long suite "A Plague of Lighthouse Keepers". The album was not commercially successful in the UK, but reached number one in Italy. It has since seen retrospective critical praise and was reissued on CD in 2005 with extra material.

The songs for the album were worked out while on tour in 1971, with further development and arranging at manager Tony Stratton Smith's house in Crowborough, Sussex over a two-month period. The original plan had been to release more material, making up a double album, but Charisma vetoed the idea. A non-album single, "Theme One" was included on some releases in the US and Canada. The album's strong commercial showing in Italy resulted in a number of lucrative promotional tours there, but the resulting pressure led to the band's split in August 1972.

The album's title came from a spoonerism by Jackson, who once said, "I'll go down to the studio and dub on some more porn harts", meaning "horn parts".

== Background and writing ==
By 1971, Van der Graaf Generator's line-up had stabilised as frontman and songwriter Peter Hammill, saxophonist David Jackson, organist and bassist Hugh Banton and drummer Guy Evans. The group had been gigging extensively and became close friends after a particularly gruelling tour of Germany. Hammill wrote "A Plague of Lighthouse Keepers" during the tour, and the group began performing "Man-Erg" towards its end. To alleviate the tedium of touring, the group invented games including "Crowborough Tennis" which involved bouncing a ball off a table, a photograph of which was eventually used as the inner sleeve for the album.

Following the tour and in preparation for the album, Hammill invited producer John Anthony to his home, where Hammill played songs intended for the album unaccompanied on acoustic guitar and piano, allowing Anthony to take recording notes. "Man-Erg" was written about the conflict between good and evil, represented as "angels" and "killers" in the song. "A Plague of Lighthouse Keepers" was inspired by Hammill's fascination with the sea, and the narrative is about a lighthouse keeper who keeps seeing people die offshore. He feels guilty about not being able to help, and the song's ending is left open, leaving the listener to decide if the keeper has committed suicide or rationalised events to live in peace. Banton was against putting "A Plague of Lighthouse Keepers" on the album, wanting more commercial material such as the previous album H to He, Who Am the Only One's "Killer", but after a band meeting he agreed to rehearse the song and worked out an arrangement. The group moved to manager Tony Stratton Smith's house, Luxford House, Crowborough, Sussex for two months in summer 1971 to rehearse material.

== Recording and production ==
Recording ran from July to September 1971 in Trident Studios. In addition to the band and Anthony, Robin Cable, David Hentschel and Ken Scott helped with engineering. The first tracks to be recorded were "Theme One", a cover of the George Martin composition used as the original closing theme to BBC Radio 1, and "W", which was ultimately left off the album. The music, particularly "A Plague of Lighthouse Keepers" was recorded in short sections between two and five minutes, which were later edited together. In addition to Hammill's original suite, Banton contributed the "Pictures/Lighthouse" section, an Olivier Messiaen-influenced organ piece, Evans wrote "Kosmos Tours" around a short piano riff, and Jackson wrote the music to the closing theme, "We Go Now". The piece was edited together by Banton and Anthony towards the end of the session. Banton used an effect called a "psychedelic razor", a customised tape recorder that could rewind and record simultaneously. The device appealed to the band's sense of humour. At one stage, every tape machine in the studio had to be used for mixing.

The album was originally conceived as a double album similar to Pink Floyd's Ummagumma (1969). The first half was made up of the album as released, while the second was to be divided between personal projects and live-in-studio versions of older Van der Graaf Generator songs such as "Killer" and "Octopus". Charisma ultimately felt that the group should simply release a single album, and vetoed the live and solo recordings.

== Release ==
The album was originally released on 12 November 1971 on Charisma Records. In the US and Canada, the album was distributed via Buddah Records and contained "Theme One" as an extra track between "Lemmings" and "Man-Erg", which was done without the band's approval. In Europe, where Pawn Hearts only contained the three tracks, "Theme One" was released as a single in February 1972, with "W" as its B-side.

When the Van der Graaf Generator catalogue was remastered for reissue in 2005, several of the tracks from the missing half of the album were found and added as bonus tracks. A live, in-studio version of "Squid/Octopus" was added to the H to He, Who Am the Only One reissue, while the Pawn Hearts reissue added "Angle of Incidents", "Ponker's Theme", and "Diminutions". The CD also contained the original mix of "Theme One", which is different to the one released as a single, and an earlier take of "W". "Theme One" was also released on the 2003 compilation CD The Best Prog Rock Album in the World... Ever.

== Composition and music ==
Sean Murphy of PopMatters described the album as being "for people to whom even Gentle Giant is not out-there enough". He explained: "Here it is, for better or worse, work that embodies many of the best accolades and worst epithets of the genre: ambitious, self-conscious, literate, sprawling, obscure, and unadulterated." Evans contributed an avant-garde piece "Angle of Incidents", which featured drums being recorded backwards and the sound of a fluorescent lighting tube being dropped down the studio's stairs. Jackson recorded "Ponker's Theme", a short jazz piece, and a longer piece, "Archimedes Agnostic", with Latin lyrics written by Hammill.

== Artwork ==
The cover was designed by regular Charisma album artist Paul Whitehead, who was told by Hammill: "no matter if you're a king, a pauper or whatever – you're a pawn", which led to a design containing the Earth and a curtain. The inner gatefold picture was taken by Keith Morris at Luxford House and featured the band playing Crowborough Tennis while appearing to give Nazi salutes to each other, though Banton later said that this was simply the band attempting to look ridiculous in the vein of Monty Python.

== Reception and legacy ==
Professional ratings
Review scores
Source	Rating
AllMusic	4/5 stars
Mojo	4/5 stars

The album was not commercially successful in the UK. A Record Mirror review said: "I have to confess complete ignorance of precisely what Van der Graaf Generator are trying to achieve", though Melody Maker were more enthusiastic, saying: "'A Plague of Lighthouse Keepers' is one of the most fascinating and dramatic items I've ever heard". However, the album reached number one on the Italian album charts. The group toured Italy to promote the album, where they were treated like superstars and surrounded by army vehicles and riot police. They followed this with a short European tour, during which they filmed a live version of "A Plague of Lighthouse Keepers" for Belgian television. The production took two hours to film as the band had not intended to perform the song live and had forgotten it. The resulting film shows Hammill singing the song while reading a lyric sheet. Regular tours of Europe followed over the next four months, but the strain of the workload became too much for the band, and they split up in August 1972.

Retrospective reviews have been favourable. Q magazine called the album a "misunderstood masterpiece", while Mojo said that it was "one of the most extraordinary albums of its era". Singer-songwriter Fish is a fan of the album, particularly of "A Plague of Lighthouse Keepers". Julian Cope has called the album "a masterpiece". Hammill has said: "although a fairly extreme musical statement, [the album] contains some of our most cohesive work".

Though "Theme One" did not chart as a single in the UK, John Peel replaced Martin's original orchestral version with the group's before closing down Radio 1 each night. The BBC subsequently carried on using Van der Graaf Generator's version. Martin enjoyed the group's cover, calling it "a powerful recording that respected the original".

== Track listing ==
Side one
No.	Title	Writer(s)	Length
1.	"Lemmings (Including 'Cog')"	Peter Hammill	11:35
2.	"Theme One" (only on original US and Canada releases)	George Martin	2:55
3.	"Man-Erg"	Hammill	10:19
Total length:			21:54 (23:49)

Side two
No.	Title	Writer(s)	Length
1.	"A Plague of Lighthouse Keepers": a. "Eyewitness" (2:25); b. "Pictures/Lighthouse" (music: Banton, Jackson) (3:10); c. "Eyewitness" (0:54); d. "S.H.M." (1:57); e. "Presence of the Night" (3:51); f. "Kosmos Tours" (music: Evans; lyrics: Hammill) (1:17); g. "(Custard's) Last Stand" (2:48); h. "The Clot Thickens" (music: Hammill, Banton, Evans, Jackson; lyrics: Hammill) (2:51); i. "Land's End (Sineline)" (music: Jackson; lyrics: Hammill) (2:01); j. "We Go Now" (music: Jackson, Banton) (1:51)	Hammill, Hugh Banton, Guy Evans, David Jackson	23:04
Total length:			23:04

Tracks on 2005 reissue
No.	Title	Writer(s)	Length
1.	"Lemmings"	Hammill	11:40
2.	"Man-Erg"	Hammill	10:26
3.	"A Plague of Lighthouse Keepers"	Hammill, Banton, Evans, Jackson	23:13
4.	"Theme One (original mix)" (different mix from US/Canada LP and UK single versions)	Martin	3:16
5.	"W (first version)" (February 1972 single used the second version)	Anonymous (Note: Some overseas releases of the "Theme One" single on Philips Records use placeholder songwriter credits for "W", among them "Unknown" and "Van Der Graaf Generator". Most releases of the song (including the original Charisma issue of the "Theme One" single, the 2005 CD issue of Pawn Hearts, and the 2021 Pawn Hearts boxed set) provide no songwriting credit for it at all.)	5:04
6.	"Angle of Incidents"	Evans	4:48
7.	"Ponker's Theme"	Jackson	1:28
8.	"Dimunitions"	Banton	6:00
Total length:			65:55

== Personnel ==
Van der Graaf Generator

- Peter Hammill – lead and backing vocals, piano, Hohner pianet, acoustic and slide guitar
- David Jackson – tenor, alto and soprano saxophones, flute, vocals
- Hugh Banton – Hammond E & C and Farfisa Professional organs, piano, Mellotron, ARP synthesizer, bass pedals, bass guitar, psychedelic razor, vocals
- Guy Evans – drums, timpani, percussion, piano

Additional personnel

- Robert Fripp – electric guitar on "A Plague of Lighthouse Keepers"

Technical

- John Anthony – production
- Robin Cable, David Hentschel, Ken Scott – engineering
- Mike and Dave C – tape op
- Howard – brightest hope
- Paul Whitehead – sleeve design
- Keith Morris – inner sleeve photography

== Charts ==
Chart (1972)	Peak position
Italian Albums (Musica e Dischi)	12

Chart (2021–2022)	Peak position
Scottish Albums (Official Charts)	52
UK Rock & Metal Albums (Official Charts)	19
