= World Record (Van der Graaf Generator album) =

Studio album by Van der Graaf Generator
- Released: October 1976
- Recorded: 10–30 May 1976
- Studio: Rockfield Studios, Monmouthshire
- Genre: Progressive rock
- Length: 52:19
- Label: UK Charisma Records, Virgin Records; USA Mercury Records
- Producer: Van der Graaf Generator

Van der Graaf Generator chronology
Still Life (1976)	World Record (1976)	The Quiet Zone/The Pleasure Dome (1977)

Professional ratings
Review scores
Source	Rating
AllMusic	3/5 stars

World Record is the seventh studio album by the British progressive rock group Van der Graaf Generator, originally released in 1976 on Charisma Records. Bonus tracks were added for the 2005 rerelease.

It was the last album recorded by the classic line-up of the band until their 2005 reunion: Hugh Banton and David Jackson departed in December 1976 and January 1977 respectively. Banton's departure was a result of financial troubles and his then-recent marriage, but he stayed to finish touring commitments. Jackson continued with Peter Hammill and Guy Evans to rehearse with the new line-up in January 1977, which featured returning bassist Nic Potter and newcomer violinist Graham Smith (of Scottish folk-rock act String Driven Thing), but left shortly after the band started rehearsing, just before the next tour.

== Track listing ==
All songs written by Peter Hammill, except where noted.

Side one
No.	Title	Length
1.	"When She Comes"	8:02
2.	"A Place to Survive"	10:05
3.	"Masks"	7:01

Side two
No.	Title	Writer(s)	Length
4.	"Meurglys III, The Songwriter's Guild"		20:50
5.	"Wondering"	Banton, Hammill	6:33

2005 CD bonus tracks - Recorded for the BBC Radio One "The John Peel Show", 11 November 1976
No.	Title	Length
6.	"When She Comes"	8:10
7.	"Masks"	7:24

== Personnel ==
Van der Graaf Generator

- Peter Hammill – vocals, guitar, piano
- David Jackson – tenor, alto and soprano saxophones, flute
- Hugh Banton – Hammond organ, bass pedals, Mellotron
- Guy Evans – drums, percussion, cymbal
