= Peter Hammill discography =

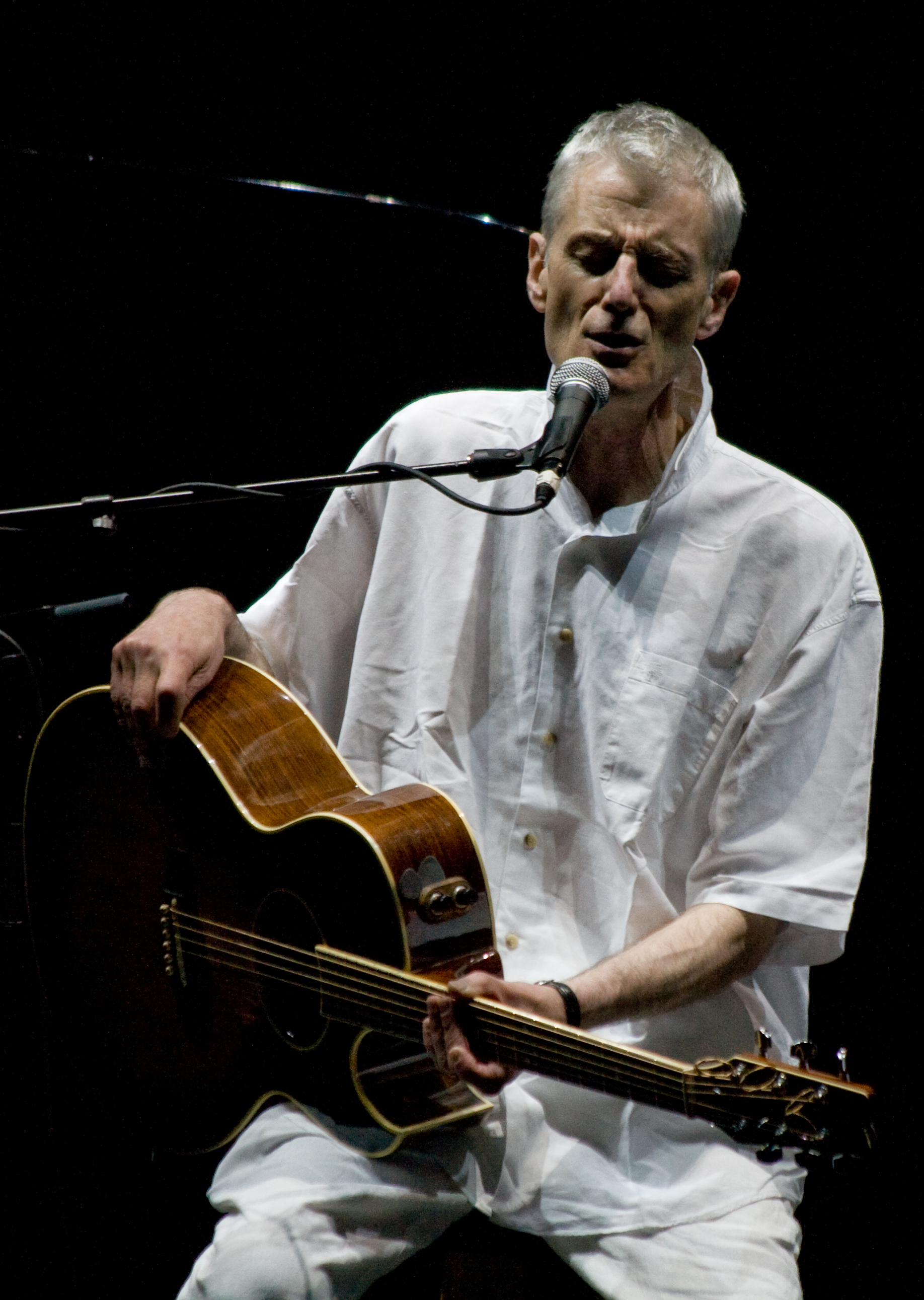
- Peter Hammill onstage at Nearfest, Bethlehem, Pennsylvania, June 2008
- Studio albums: 41
- Live albums: 13
- Compilation albums: 10
- Singles: 11
- Video albums: 2

This is the discography of Peter Hammill, English singer-songwriter, and a founding member of progressive rock band Van der Graaf Generator. For albums released by Van der Graaf Generator, see Van der Graaf Generator discography.

== Studio albums ==
- Fool's Mate (July 1971)
- Chameleon in the Shadow of the Night (May 1973)
- The Silent Corner and the Empty Stage (February 1974)
- In Camera (September 1974)
- Nadir's Big Chance (February 1975)
- Over (April 1977)
- The Future Now (September 1978)
- pH7 (September 1979)
- A Black Box (August 1980)
- Sitting Targets (June 1981)
- Enter K (October 1982)
- Loops and Reels (June 1983)
- Patience (August 1983)
- Skin (March 1986)
- And Close As This (November 1986)
- Spur of the Moment (February 1988, instrumental, with Guy Evans)
- In a Foreign Town (November 1988, reworked version released as In a Foreign Town 2023 in November 2023)
- Out of Water (February 1990, reworked version released as Out of Water 2023 in November 2023)
- The Fall of the House of Usher (November 1991, deconstructed and rebuilt released in November 1999)
- Fireships (March 1992)
- The Noise (March 1993)
- Roaring Forties (September 1994)
- X My Heart (March 1996)
- Sonix (November 1996)
- Everyone You Hold (June 1997)
- This (October 1998)
- The Appointed Hour (November 1999, instrumental, with Roger Eno)
- None of the Above (April 2000)
- What, Now? (June 2001)
- Unsung (October 2001, instrumental)
- Clutch (October 2002)
- Incoherence (March 2004)
- Singularity (December 2006)
- Thin Air (June 2009)
- Consequences (April 2012)
- Other World (February 2014, with Gary Lucas)
- ...All That Might Have Been... (November 2014)
- From the Trees (November 2017)
- In Amazonia (2019, with Isildurs Bane)
- In Translation (May 2021)
- In Disequilibrium (24 September 2021, with Isildurs Bane)
- Tears In Time (25 September 2026)

== Live albums ==
- The Margin (February 1985)
- Room Temperature (November 1990)
- There Goes The Daylight (November 1993)
- The Peel Sessions (November 1995, BBC radio sessions 1974–1988)
- The Union Chapel Concert (March 1997, with Guy Evans and others)
- Typical (April 1999)
- The Margin + (May 2002)
- Veracious (February 2006)
- Pno Gtr Vox (October 2011)
- Pno Gtr Vox Box (February 2012)
- Peter Hammill & The K Group Live at Rockpalast 26/11/81 (26 August 2016)
- X/Ten (November 2018)
- Not Yet Not Now (March 2019)

== Singles ==
- "Red Shift 1" c/w "Red Shift 2" (Italy, February 1974)
- "Birthday Special" c/w "Shingle Song" (UK, February 1975, released under the alias of Rikki Nadir)
- "If I Could" c/w "The Future Now" (Canada, September 1978)
- "The Polaroid" c/w "The Old School Tie" (UK and Australia, August 1979)
- "My Experience" c/w "Glue" (UK, May 1981)
- "My Experience" c/w "What I Did" (Netherlands, May 1981)
- "Paradox Drive" c/w "Now More Than Ever" (UK, Netherlands and Spain, September 1982)
- "Film Noir" c/w "Seven Wonders" (UK, September 1983)
- "Just Good Friends" c/w "Just Good Friends (instr)" (UK, May 1985)
- "Painting By Numbers" c/w "You Hit Me Where I Live" (UK and Spain, March 1986)

== Videos ==
- In The Passionskirche (1992, concert of 11 April 1992)
- Peter Hammill & The K Group Live at Rockpalast 26/11/81 (26 August 2016)

== Compilations ==
- Vision (1978)
- The Love Songs (August 1984, re-recorded back catalogue)
- The Essential Collection (1986, Enter K and Patience collected)
- A Fix On The Mix (November 1992, EP)
- The Storm (Before The Calm) (July 1993, more aggressive Virgin-era material)
- The Calm (After The Storm) (July 1993, Virgin-era ballads)
- Offensichtlich Goldfisch (July 1993, songs re-recorded in German)
- After The Show (January 1996)
- Past Go: Collected (September 1996)
- The Thin Man Sings Ballads (May 2002)

== Other compilation album appearances (incomplete) ==
- Charisma Disturbance (1973, double LP, Charisma TSS1) – track 4: "German Overalls"
- Charisma Festival (1977, double LP, Charisma Germany 6641 701) – track 16: "Crying Wolf"
- Music and Rhythm (1982, double LP, WEA K 68045) – track 16: "A Ritual Mask"
- The Enigma Variations (1987, double LP, Enigma Records, SQBB-73247) – side 2, track 5: "Too Many of My Yesterdays"; side 4, track 5: "Painting by Numbers"
- The Enigma Variations (1987, CD, Enigma Records, CDEX-73247) – track 10: "Too Many of My Yesterdays"
- Der Sampler 1 (1986, LP, Line Records, LILP 4.00201E) – track 3, side 2: "Painting by Numbers"
- Der Sampler 16 (1986, LP, Line Records, LILP 4.00256) – track 1, side 2: "Too Many Of My Yesterdays"
- Der Sampler 31 (1989, CD, Line Records, LICD 9.00621J) – track 1: "Hemlock"
- Der Sampler 36 (1989, CD, Line Records, LICD 9.00806J) – track 6: "Painting by Numbers"
- Der Sampler 39 (1989, CD, Line Records, LICD 9.00809J) – track 21: "Too Many Of My Yesterdays"
- Plus from Us (1993, CD, Real World Records, 0777 7 87858 2 8) – track 3: "Oasis"
- Sometimes God Hides: The Young Person's Guide to Discipline, Volume 1 (1996, CD, DGM Records, DGM9605) – track 11: "A Better Time (Acapella)"
- Sometimes God Smiles: The Young Person's Guide to Discipline, Volume 2 (1998, CD, DGM Records, DGM9808) – track 9: "Nothing Comes"
- The Roots Of The Sex Pistols (15 Tracks That Inspired A Revolution) (2005, CD, Mojo Magazine) – track 12: "Nadir's Big Chance"
- Refugees: A Charisma Records Anthology 1969-78 (17 November 2009, 3CD, CASBOX 2) – CD1 track 8: "Re-awakening"; CD2 track 15: "Red Shift"; CD3 track 3: "Nadir's Big Chance"
- Separate Paths Together: An Anthology of British Male Singer-Songwriters 1965-75 (August 2021, 3CD, Grapefruit/Cherry Red Records, CRSE GBOX 096) – CD1 track 15: "Easy to Slip Away"
- Steven Wilson Presents: Intrigue - Progressive Sounds In UK Alternative Music 1979–89 (10 February 2023, 4CD, Edsel Records EDSL0133) – CD3 track 7: "Comfortable"
- Round and Round – Progressive Sounds of 1974 (30 June 2023, 2CD, Esoteric/Cherry Red Records, ECLEC42831) – CD2 track 2: "Tapeworm"; CD4 track 7: "Red Shift"

== Guest appearances ==
- Colin Scot, Colin Scot (1971) – provided backing vocals on several tracks
- Le Orme, Felona and Sorona (1974) – wrote English language lyrics for the Charisma Records UK release of the Italian album Felona e Sorona (1973)
- Robert Fripp, Exposure (June 1979) – co-wrote and sang lead vocals on "Disengage", sang lead vocals on "Chicago", and duetted with Terre Roche on "I May Not Have Had Enough of Me but I've Had Enough of You"
- Ludus, The Visit (1980, 12 inch) – provided "attention and advice"
- Peter Gabriel, Security (September 1982) – sang backing vocals on "The Family and the Fishing Net", "Shock the Monkey" and "Lay Your Hands on me"
- Georgia II, The Flag / Tunnel Vision (1982, 7 inch and 12 inch) – sang backing vocals and played guitar
- The Long Hello, The Long Hello Volume 3 (David Jackson) (1982) – played organ solo and keyboard sounds on "The Honing of Homer"
- Miguel Bosé, Bandido (1984) – wrote the lyrics of "South of the Sahara" and "Domine Mundi"
- Islo Mob, Wir Sind das Abendland (1985) – sang backing vocals
- Damian Hawkyard, Ill at Ease (1986, EP) – sang backing vocals on one track
- Ayuo, Nova Carmina (1986) – sang lead vocals on some tracks
- Kazue Sawai, Eye To Eye (1987) – contributed on "A Song To Fallen Blossoms"
- Herbert Grönemeyer, What's All This (1988) – wrote the English lyrics
- Crazy House, Still Looking For Heaven On Earth (1988) – played piano on "Feel That Way"
- Alice, Il sole nella pioggia (1989) – co-wrote and sang on "Now and Forever"
- Nic Potter, The Blue Zone (1990) – played guitar on "Ocean Blue"
- Judge Smith, Democrazy (1991) – co-wrote and played on various songs
- Peter Gabriel, Us (September 1992) – sang backing vocals on "Digging in the Dirt"
- Christian Demand, Kleine Fluchten (1993) – sang and played midi-guitar
- The Stranglers, The Stranglers and Friends – Live in Concert (1995) – sang on "Tank" and "The Raven"
- Ayuo, Songs from a Eurasian Journey (1997) – sang lead vocals on several tracks
- Saro Cosentino, Ones And Zeros (1997) – co-wrote and sang on "Phosphorescence" and "From Far Away"
- David Cross, Exiles (1997) – sang lead vocals on "Tonk" and "Troppo"
- Moondog, Sax Pax for a Sax (November 1997) – sang backing vocals
- Wolfram Huschke, Alien Diary (1998) – sang lead vocals on "Black Rose"
- Pale Orchestra conducted by David Thomas, Mirror Man Act 1: Jack & The General (1998) – played harmonium, guitar and keyboards
- Alice, Exit (1998) – wrote the lyrics of "Open Your Eyes"
- Various Artists, Hommage to Polnareff (1999) – sang lead vocals on "Jour Après Jour"
- Jackie Leven, Defending Ancient Springs (2000) – played harmonium, guitar and keyboard on "Morbid Sky"
- Judge Smith, Curly's Airships (October 2000) – performed the part of Lord Thomson
- Ayuo, Earth Guitar – 1000 Springs And Other Stories (2000) – sang the gothic choir and did poetry reading
- Premiata Forneria Marconi, PFM Live in Japan 2002 (2002) – sang lead vocals on "Sea of Memory"
- David Rhodes, Bittersweet (2009) – sang backing vocals
- Memories of Machines, Warm Winter (May 2011) – played guitar
- Tim Bowness, Stupid Things That Mean the World (July 2015) – backing vocals and slide guitar
- Notopia, Celebrating Life (November 2017) – lead vocals on "Celebrate" and "Connect"
- Tim Bowness, Flowers at the Scene (March 2019) – vocals, guitar on "It's the World"; vocals on "Killing to Survive"
- Tim Bowness & Peter Chilvers, Modern Ruins (May 2020) – stealth guitar on "Blog Remember Me"
- Jakko Jakszyk, Secrets & Lies (October 2020) – vocals, guitar and co-wrote one song
- The Amorphous Androgynous, We Persuade Ourselves We Are Immortal (2020) – co-writer; lead vocals
- Lush Fresh Handmade Sound, Tales of Bath (19 March 2021) – vocals on Track 6 "The Cutty Wren"; voice on Track 10 "In a Bath Teashop"
- Tim Bowness, Butterfly Mind (2022) – vocals, guitar on "Say Your Goodbyes", "We Feel"
- Saro Cosentino, The Road To Now (2022) – vocals, guitar on "The Joke", "November", "Time to Go", "When Your Parents Danced"

== As producer ==
- Random Hold, Random Hold (1979, 5-song EP, later included in Avalanche)
- Random Hold, The View From Here (1979, LP, later included in Avalanche)
- Random Hold, Etceteraville / Precarious Timbers (1979, SP, later included in Avalanche)
- Random Hold, Cause & Effect / What Happened (1980, SP, later included in Avalanche)
- Random Hold, Etceteraville (1980, US release LP, later included in Avalanche)
- Random Hold, Avalanche (1980, double LP); re-released as The View From Here (2001, double CD)
- Essential Bop, The Bristol Recorder 3 (1981, LP)
- Julia Downes, Playing For Time / Romantic(1982, SP) – track "Romantic"
- Julia Downes, Let Sleeping Dogs Lie (1983, LP) – two tracks
- Essential Bop, The Flick Was Boss (1984, LP)
- Crazy House, Still Looking For Heaven On Earth (1988, CD) - track "Feel That Way"
- Crazy House, Burning Rain / Garden Of Luck (1988, SP) – track "Burning Rain"
- David Jackson, Fractal Bridge (1996, CD)
- Tim Bowness & Peter Chilvers, Modern Ruins (May 2020, CD) – album mixing
