= Vital (Van der Graaf Generator album) =

Vital: Van der Graaf Live

Live album by Van der Graaf
- Released: 14 July 1978
- Recorded: 16 January 1978
- Venues: Marquee Club, London
- Genres: Progressive rock, punk rock
- Length: 86:14
- Labels: UK Charisma Records; USA PVC Records
- Producer: Guy Evans

Van der Graaf chronology
The Quiet Zone/The Pleasure Dome (1977)	Vital: Van der Graaf Live (1978)	Time Vaults (1982)

Professional ratings
Review scores
Source	Rating
AllMusic	3/5 stars

Vital: Van der Graaf Live is the first live album by English progressive rock band Van der Graaf Generator. It was recorded 16 January 1978 at the Marquee Club in London and was released in July, one month after the band's 1978 break-up. The album (on vinyl and, later, on CD) was credited under the abbreviated name Van der Graaf, like the previous year's The Quiet Zone/The Pleasure Dome (1977), and featured the same line-up plus newcomer cellist/keyboardist Charles Dickie, who had officially joined the band in August 1977, and original saxophonist and flautist David Jackson, who re-joined the band for this recording.

The album is noted for its sometimes radical reworking of the older material. Although Van der Graaf Generator were seldom less than intense on stage, the 1977 and 1978 tours were remarkable for their ferocity. The absence of Hugh Banton, whose organ work was a hallmark of the group's sound before his departure in 1976, as well as frontman Peter Hammill's increased duties as a rhythm guitarist, account for much of this.

== Background ==
Van der Graaf Generator, in their 'Van der Graaf' incarnation, debuted on 20 February 1977 at the Roundhouse in London. After a European tour with Charisma Records labelmates Hawkwind and a concert at Brunel University on 25 March, the band spent a month recording their next album, The Quiet Zone/The Pleasure Dome, at the Foel, Rockfield, and Morgan recording studios. Following two concerts in Ibiza, cellist Charles Dickie was added to the line-up in August. Dickie debuted with Van der Graaf in September at the First Rider Open Air Festival Scheeßel. For the rest of 1977, the band toured in Portugal, Belgium, the United Kingdom, France, Switzerland and Germany.

After this, a two-night stint at the Marquee Club in London was scheduled for 15–16 January 1978, and David Jackson, who had left almost exactly one year before for financial, personal, and musical reasons, was invited to join Van der Graaf for these shows. As a guest, Jackson played only in the second part of the shows, but as the two opening songs ("Cat's Eye/Yellow Fever" and "The Sphinx in the Face") were omitted for the album, there were only four songs left on Vital on which he wasn't featured. The two opening tracks of the concert "Cat's Eye/Yellow Fever" and "The Sphinx in the Face" are still considered to be lost.

== Recording ==
The original 1978 album notes stated that a 16-track mobile recording unit was used to record Van der Graaf's second performance of their Marquee stint, and Guy Evans used these tapes to mix what would become Vital at Foel Studio. Notes later added to the 2005 reissue state that a 24-track recorder was used. At this time, Peter Hammill was touring in America and completing his next solo album, The Future Now (1978). Evans discovered a technical problem with the tapes. Jackson said about this:

Because of the technical restrictions placed upon the recording I was only allocated one track of the 24 available on the tape. When Guy came to mix the tapes he discovered that my track was completely silent. There had been a fault on the line to the tape machines. Guy had to search through all the other tracks to find those where my saxophone had bled onto them, such as the vocal track. He then had to take out my sax, clean it up, and boost the level. That's what you hear on the finished album.

== Songs ==
"Ship of Fools" was the B-side to the 1977 "Cat's Eye" single, only released in France. A first release on CD appeared on the compilation album "I Prophesy Disaster", and the same reissue series, that released Vital in its entirety, made the studio version again available as a bonus track on the release of The Quiet Zone/The Pleasure Dome (1977). "Door" was another song from around this time, and a long unknown studio recording was featured both on The Box and the aforementioned reissue of The Quiet Zone/The Pleasure Dome. A studio version of "Mirror Images" would later appear on Peter Hammill's 1979 solo album pH7, and "Nadir's Big Chance" was the title track to his 1975 studio album of the same name. Hammill would also re-record "Sci-Finance" as "Sci-Finance (Revisited)" with some altered lyrics on his 1988 solo album In a Foreign Town. In his review for AllMusic, Greg Prato called "Sci-Finance (Revisited)" "Talking Heads-like." "Urban" was a composition that was sometimes played in 1975 (without the instrumental section taken from "Killer"), but was the only then new song of which no studio version was recorded. The newly reformed Van der Graaf returned to Urban for the spring tour 1977, now with the added section from "Killer", then dropped the track again for the rest of the year, before it came back to the set in 1978. It is now the only song from Vital of which no studio version is known. The "Medley" is a combination of the "A Plague of Lighthouse Keepers" sections "Eyewitness" and "The Clot Thickens" with the 2nd part of "The Sleepwalkers". A studio version of this unique track was recorded for a Peel session in Oct 1977, and has been released on the VdGG BBC compilation After the Flood: At the BBC 1968-1977.

The studio version of "Still Life" was on the eponymous 1976 album, a studio version of "Last Frame" was on The Quiet Zone/The Pleasure Dome, and studio versions of "Killer" and "Pioneers Over c" are the bookends of H to He, Who Am the Only One (1970). The studio version of "The Sleepwalkers" is on Godbluff (1975), and the studio version of "A Plague of Lighthouse Keepers" is on Pawn Hearts (1971).

== Track listing ==
All tracks are written by Peter Hammill except where indicated.

Side one
No.	Title	Studio release	Length
1.	"Ship of Fools"	B-side of "Cat's Eye" single (1977)	6:44
2.	"Still Life"	Still Life (1976)	9:44
3.	"Last Frame"	The Quiet Zone/The Pleasure Dome (1977)	9:05

Side two
No.	Title	Writer(s)	Studio release	Length
4.	"Mirror Images"		ph7 (1979)*	5:51
5.	"Medley: A Plague of Lighthouse Keepers / The Sleepwalkers"	Hammill, Hugh Banton, Guy Evans, David Jackson / Hammill	Pawn Hearts (1971) / Godbluff (1975)	13:43

Side three
No.	Title	Writer(s)	Studio release	Length
6.	"Pioneers over c"	Hammill, Jackson	H to He, Who Am the Only One (1970)	17:08
7.	"Sci-Finance"		In a Foreign Town (1988)*	6:13

Side four
No.	Title	Writer(s)	Studio release	Length
8.	"Door"		The Box (2000), The Quiet Zone/The Pleasure Dome bonus track (2005 reissue)	5:30
9.	"Urban / Killer / Urban"	Hammill / Hammill, Chris Judge Smith, Banton / Hammill	none / H to He, Who Am the Only One (1970)	8:18
10.	"Nadir's Big Chance"		Nadir's Big Chance (1975)*	3:59

Note: Peter Hammill solo album are marked (*)

== Release ==
The European release was a double LP on Charisma Records, ref'ed CVL0D101; the US release on double vinyl LP was on PVC Records, PVC 9901. The album was originally issued twice on CD in the UK (CVLCD101, 1989), first with the entire 2LP track listing on the cover and label, but only actually containing sides one and two, and then reissued restoring some of the songs from sides three and four (excluding "Sci-Finance" and "Nadir's Big Chance") and correcting the cover and label. The entire album was only originally issued on CD in Japan (VJD-25023~24, 1989), and this had a booklet with incorrect lyrics (for instance "Sit down with the greats" on "Still Life" instead of the correct "Citadel reverberates"). In 2005, a remastered double CD version (CVLCDR101) restored the omitted tracks, as part of a Van der Graaf Generator reissue series from Virgin Records, who revived the Charisma Records imprint to commemorate the 2005 reunion album Present. Vital was again (and better) remastered for a release on The Charisma Years (2021) box set.

== Response ==
Vital has been reviewed twice on AllMusic. Bruce Eder's review refers to the CVLCD101 CD pressing (which omits "Sci-Finance" and "Nadir's Big Chance"), while Dave Thompson's review covers the 2005 re-release, which on a 2CD features all songs from the initial double LP. Eder writes that "the group presents the raw, up-close, in-your-face approach that made Van Der Graaf Generator favorites of the punk bands despite the group's prog rock origins – between Hammill's loud, raspy vocals and his crunchy overamplified guitar, 'Still Life', 'Door', and 'Pioneers Over c' all sound almost like punk band performances." Both reviews give Vital a three-star rating out of five.

At the time, critical response was generally positive. A positive review appeared in Melody Maker that called VdGG "a band with enough enigma to keep Sherlock Holmes on the case for three volumes," and stated that "[Vital] indicates more fully than ever the inspired maelstrom of bitter vision and controlled desolate grandeur that Van der Graaf can create". John Gill, reviewing for Sounds said "Unashamedly betraying my partisan affections, 'Vital' really is," and that "[the album] captures the dark soul of VdG, laying past and present musical nightmares on to vinyl".

A negative review published in NME by John Gray said "...even endless ecstasy can be boring." While Gray praised Vital's revamp of "Pioneers over c" as sounding "well-rehearsed and complete," favourably compared Nic Potter's bass sound to Jannick Top of Magma, and approved of some of the violin and cello work, he was critical of "torturous renditions of two of Hammill's best songs" ("Still Life", "Last Frame"), claimed the deliberately omitted lyrics in the medley of "A Plague of Lighthouse Keepers" and "Sleepwalkers" "rendered [them] ineffective", and responded to the "Nadir's Big Chance" lyric "jerks in leather bondage suits" by writing "what Hammill doesn't realize is that there's more bondage in his songs than there will ever be down the Kings Road."

== Personnel ==
Van der Graaf

- Peter Hammill – vocals, piano, guitar
- Nic Potter – bass
- Graham Smith – violin
- Charles Dickie – cello, electric piano, synthesizer
- David Jackson – saxophones and flute (plays on tracks 4–7, 9-10)
- Guy Evans – drums

Technical

- Mike Dunne – recording engineer
- Mixed at Foel Studio, Llanfaircaereinion, Powys
- Dave Anderson – engineer
- Guy Evans – producer
- Peter Hammill – existential producer
- Cover photo by Gordian Troeller
- Stage equipment by: Faraday & John Goodman
- Sound by: H.H.B., Martin Westwood, Noel Mawer & Graham Hayes
- 16 track by: Brian
- Gordianisation [sic] by: Troeller
