= The Love Songs (Peter Hammill album) =

Studio album by Peter Hammill
- Released: 20 August 1984
- Studio: Sofa Sound, Surrey
- Genre: Art rock
- Length: 41:53
- Label: Charisma
- Producer: Peter Hammill, David Lord

Peter Hammill chronology
Patience (1983)	The Love Songs (1984)	The Margin (1985)

Professional ratings
Review scores
Source	Rating
Allmusic	2/5 stars

The Love Songs is an album by Peter Hammill, originally released on Charisma Records in 1984.

The album is a compilation of ballads from Hammill's previous solo albums, re-recorded in new versions — all reworked, redubbed and remixed to form this album. The lead vocals were re-recorded on all tracks, except "Been Alone So Long". All tracks were based on the original multitracks, except "Again" and "If I Could", which are based on live K Group performances taken from the 1983 Margin Tour.

== Track listing ==
All songs written by Peter Hammill, except "Been Alone So Long" written by Chris Judge Smith.

Side one
No.	Title	Original albums	Length
1.	"Just Good Friends"	Patience	4:00
2.	"My Favourite"	pH7	2:58
3.	"Been Alone So Long"	Nadir's Big Chance	5:00
4.	"Ophelia"	Sitting Targets	3:05
5.	"Again"	In Camera	3:30
Total length:			18:33

Side two
No.	Title	Original album	Length
6.	"If I Could"	The Future Now	4:58
7.	"Vision"	Fool's Mate	3:14
8.	"Don't Tell Me"	Enter k	4:38
9.	"The Birds"	Fool's Mate	3:35
10.	"This Side of the Looking Glass"	Over	6:55
Total length:			23:20

== Personnel ==
- Peter Hammill – vocals, guitar, keyboards, bass, drums
- Graham Smith – violin (2)
- David Jackson – saxophone (3, 8, 9)
- Nic Potter – bass (5, 6, 9)
- Guy Evans – drums (3, 5, 6, 9)
- Hugh Banton – bass (3), piano (7), organ (9)
- Stuart Gordon – violin (1, 7)
- John Ellis – guitar (5, 6, 8)
- Manny Elias – drums (1)
- David Lord – synthesizer (1)
- Robert Fripp – guitar (9)

Technical

- Paul Ridout – cover
- Adrian Peacock – photography
