= H to He, Who Am the Only One =

1970 studio album by Van der Graaf Generator

Studio album by Van der Graaf Generator
- Released: December 1970
- Recorded: June–November 1970
- Studio: Trident, London, England
- Genre: Progressive rock
- Length: 47:15
- Label: Charisma (UK); Dunhill (US)
- Producer: John Anthony

Van der Graaf Generator chronology
The Least We Can Do Is Wave to Each Other (1970)	H to He, Who Am the Only One (1970)	Pawn Hearts (1971)

H to He, Who Am the Only One is the third album by the British progressive rock band Van der Graaf Generator. It was released in December 1970 on Charisma Records.

The band recorded the album in several stages throughout mid-1970 in Trident Studios with producer John Anthony. The songs' lyrics refer to a killer shark in "Killer", isolation and loneliness in "House With No Door", lost love in "Lost" and science fiction material in "Pioneers Over c". Bassist Nic Potter left the group in August partway through recording, with organist Hugh Banton covering on bass guitar in the studio and playing bass pedals in concert. King Crimson's Robert Fripp made a guest appearance on guitar, and the cover was the first of several by the band to feature the artwork of Paul Whitehead.

The album did not chart in the UK, and contemporary reviews were mixed, but it has since been regarded as a good example of progressive rock albums by critics. "Killer" has been singled out for praise as a fan favourite.

== Background ==
The group's previous album, The Least We Can Do Is Wave to Each Other (February 1970) had achieved a small amount of commercial success and critical acclaim in the UK and Europe. The next project the group attempted was recording the soundtrack to the 1970 film Eyewitness, but it was rejected, largely for being too sinister. They started to develop a live following during 1970, counting film director Anthony Minghella as one of their fans, but things backfired after a show at the Royal Festival Hall in June that drew negative reviews from Melody Maker's Chris Welch. Around this time, the band decided to write some new material for a follow-up album.

The first song to be attempted was "Killer", which came out of a rehearsal which tried to join fragments of songs together in a deliberate attempt to create something that would be commercially successful. The track was a composite of a basic song structure written by group leader Peter Hammill in 1968, an old song written by founding member Judge Smith called "A Cloud as Big as a Man's Hand", and a rock riff composed by organist Hugh Banton that he later said was influenced by The Move's "Brontosaurus". The lyrics referred to a shark in the ocean, who becomes lonely through killing everything. "Killer" quickly became a live favourite with fans, and the group's signature track.

Hammill wrote "The Emperor in His War Room" about a tyrant who tortures people indiscriminately but is ultimately haunted by those he has tormented. The music joined together two different sections, a sombre opening and closing combined with a bass-driven rock section in the middle. "Lost" was, uncharacteristically for the band, a straightforward song about lost love and the group added several different instrumental sections into the basic structure.

"We are the ones they're going to build
a statue for
Ten centuries ago
Or were going to fifteen forward"

— "Pioneers Over c"

"Pioneers Over c" was co-written by Hammill and saxophonist David Jackson. The song had a strong science fiction premise and was about a group of astronauts who travel faster than the speed of light (hence the lower case "c" in the title) on a relativistic one-way journey that takes them beyond the physical universe. The lyrics are a first-person account of the experience from an astronaut's point of view. The whole band helped with the arrangement, coming up with musical themes to match the lyrical themes of isolation and dissolution.

The last track to be written for the album was "House with No Door". Hammill wrote the song on piano, which was about someone who had difficulty forming friendships and was unable to have meaningful contact with other people. The song is one of several by Hammill to use a house as a metaphor, which would be revisited in subsequent solo work.

== Recording ==
As with previous Van der Graaf Generator albums, the band collaborated with producer John Anthony at Trident Studios, who had established a good working relationship with the band. However, recording for H to He was sporadic, and occurred intermittently between gigs throughout 1970.

Hammill wanted King Crimson's guitarist and bandleader Robert Fripp to play on "The Emperor In His War Room". Fripp had never played as a session musician at that point, but had enjoyed listening to The Least We Can Do ... and was persuaded to take part by Anthony. Jackson recalled that Fripp "set up all of his stuff, put his headphones on, and started searing away." Fripp played the guitar part twice, having never heard the track before, and a composite of both takes appears on the final recording. Fripp has subsequently introduced Anthony as "the guy who gave me my first session" at events. Fripp would collaborate again with Van der Graaf Generator on their next album, Pawn Hearts, released the following year.

The group took a break from recording to play several festivals throughout the summer of 1970. In July, they played at the Munich and Aachen Festivals with Deep Purple, Pink Floyd, Black Sabbath and Fairport Convention. In August, the group played a show as part of BBC Radio 1's "In Concert" series, which included "Killer", and performed at the 10th National Jazz and Blues Festival at Plumpton on 9 August.

Immediately after the show, bassist Nic Potter quit the band, before the album was completed (he played on the already recorded tracks "Killer", "The Emperor in His War Room" and "Lost"). The group quickly auditioned Dave Anderson, roadie for Brinsley Schwarz who knew Van der Graaf Generator socially, but the group struggled during rehearsals to form a cohesive sound. As an alternative, Banton, who had a background in classical and church organ music, suggested he could simply play all the bass parts on bass pedals instead, purchasing a Hammond organ to augment his existing Farfisa. Anderson was retained as a roadie. To further expand the sound, Jackson started working with electric saxophones, playing them through effects boxes including a wah-wah.

Banton decided to play bass guitar as well as organ for the remaining studio sessions, being familiar with the instrument. "Pioneers Over c" was recorded in sections in the studio, then edited together, making it impossible to perform live in concert. Banton used an oscillator as a musical device to complement that track's lyrical theme. By contrast, "House with No Door" was mostly put down live. The group found the sessions enjoyable despite some of the downbeat themes present on the album, and all found fun in some of the esoteric sounds they were creating.

To promote the album, the band went on Charisma's "Six Bob Tour" with Genesis and Lindisfarne. As Van der Graaf Generator had been signed to Charisma the longest, they were the headline act.

== Artwork ==
The cover was drawn by Paul Whitehead, and was inspired by "Pioneers Over c". The front cover was a painting he had already completed, called "Birthday", which showed a beam of light focusing on London, illustrating Whitehead's birth. The inner gatefold picture was called "Checkmate". "H to He" in the title refers to the fusion of hydrogen nuclei to form helium nuclei, a basic exothermic reaction that takes place in the Sun and other stars.

The first U.S. issue of the album was on the Dunhill Records division of ABC Records. It featured a revised cover with a white background instead of purple. The mid-priced "Charisma Classics" re-issue from the early 1980s had a blue cover. A re-mastered version of this album added bonus tracks and was released in 2005. One of the additions is a studio version of "Squid / Octopus", a song that had been a staple of early Van der Graaf Generator concerts.

Whitehead would go on to draw several other covers for the band, and for other Charisma artists, including Genesis. He became something of a "house artist" for the label in the early 1970s.

== Reception ==
Professional ratings
Review scores
Source	Rating
AllMusic	4/5 stars

The album was released in December 1970, but did not sell as well as The Least We Can Do, and did not reach the album charts in the UK. Charisma hoped the group could produce another single like "Refugees", released earlier in the year. There was some interest in releasing "Killer" as a single, but the band rejected this as they might have been pigeonholed as a hard rock band. The group felt there was some conflict of interest by having Tony Stratton Smith both as manager and record company owner.

Contemporary reviews of the album were mainly positive to mixed. Melody Maker praised "the brilliance of the songs", Sounds enjoyed Jackson's sax playing, and Record Mirror thought the band would be "one of the groups most likely to succeed in 1971". Disc & Music Echo were less favourable, complaining that the group's sound was "distinctive but somehow mainly boring".

Retrospective reviews have been positive. In 2000, Q Magazine listed the album as one of the best progressive rock albums of all time, saying "texturally, they were unmistakable. No guitars, just thick dark layers of organ and saxophone." AllMusic's Mike DeGagne rated the album 4 out of 5, noting that "the brooding tones of synthesizer and oscillator along with Peter Hammill's distinct and overly ominous voice make it one of this British band's best efforts." Paul Stump commented in his 1997 History of Progressive Rock, "The deep soundstage and paradoxically close miking, the gruffly roaring timbres of Hugh Banton's organ and sudden acoustic blips - such as Jackson's astonishing shift into a choked, suffocating acoustic on 'Pioneers Over C' - shaped a nightmare. Odd chords and odd ostinati ('House with No Door') helped - indeed the whole project was by now infested with grotesquerie." Iron Maiden's Bruce Dickinson and Blur's Graham Coxon have both spoken favourably about the album.

== Track listing ==
All tracks are written by Peter Hammill, except where indicated.

Side one
No.	Title	Writer(s)	Length
1.	"Killer"	Hammill, Chris Judge Smith, Hugh Banton	8:24
2.	"House with No Door"		6:37
3.	"The Emperor in His War Room" a. "The Emperor" b. "The Room"		8:15

Side two
No.	Title	Writer(s)	Length
4.	"Lost" a. "The Dance in Sand and Sea" b. "The Dance in Frost"		11:17
5.	"Pioneers Over c (Note: Credited as "The Pioneers Over C." in the lyrics on the rear cover)"	Hammill, David Jackson	12:42

Bonus tracks on 2005 reissue
No.	Title	Length
6.	"Squid 1 / Squid 2 / Octopus" (Recorded during the sessions for Pawn Hearts)	15:24
7.	"The Emperor in His War Room" (first version)	8:50

== Personnel ==
Taken from the sleeve notes

=== Van der Graaf Generator ===
- Peter Hammill – lead vocals, acoustic guitar, piano on "House with No Door"
- David Jackson – alto, tenor, and baritone saxophone and devices, flute, vocals
- Hugh Banton – Hammond and Farfisa organs, piano, oscillator, vocals; bass guitar on "House with No Door" and "Pioneers Over c."
- Nic Potter – bass guitar on "Killer", "The Emperor in His War Room", "Lost", and "The Emperor in His War Room (First version)"
- Guy Evans – drums, timpani, percussion

=== Additional personnel ===
- Robert Fripp – guitar on "The Emperor in His War Room"

=== Production ===
- John Anthony – producer
- Robin Cable – engineer
- David Hentschel – assistant engineer
- Paul Whitehead – front and back cover ("Birthday"), middle cover ("Checkmate")

== Charts ==
Chart (2022)	Peak position
Scottish Albums (OCC)	83
UK Rock & Metal Albums (OCC)	24
