= Paul Whitehead =

British painter and graphic artist

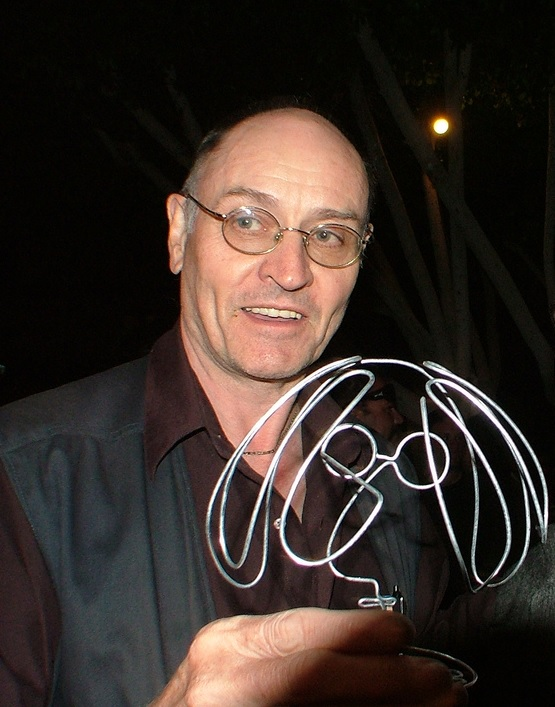
Paul Whitehead with a wire sculpture of John Lennon.

Paul Whitehead is a British painter and graphic artist known for his surrealistic album covers for artists on the Charisma Records label in the 1970s, such as Genesis and Van der Graaf Generator.

== Life and work ==
=== England: Liberty Records and Charisma Records ===
An art show in London in the mid-sixties led to Whitehead being picked up as an in-house artist for the London office of Jazz record label Liberty Records. Previously, he had been studying at the University of Oxford on an art scholarship. The first record cover he designed was for a repackaged Fats Domino album. This was followed by a series of work for other reissues for the UK market. In 1968, Whitehead became the original art director for Time Out in London magazine, which led him to further commissions for album covers.

After a meeting with producer John Anthony, Whitehead was introduced to Tony Stratton Smith, the founder of Charisma Records. Smith introduced Whitehead to Genesis, and he was hired to do the cover to their 1970 album, Trespass. Charisma Records allowed Whitehead complete creative control over his work. Fruitful work in collaboration with Genesis, Van der Graaf Generator, Lindisfarne, and Peter Hammill followed at Charisma. Additionally, Whitehead is also credited as a performer on the Peter Hammill albums Fool's Mate (drums) and In Camera (percussion).

=== United States ===
In 1973, Whitehead moved to Los Angeles, where he continued to work on album covers as a freelancer. He is still most associated with progressive rock, and designed the 2000 logo for NEARfest.

As a founder of the Eyes and Ears Foundation, he conceived of and organised the "Drive Though Art Gallery" Artboard Festival in February 1977, where artists painted on donated billboards. He has also created murals and designed corporate logos. Whitehead was in the Guinness Book of World Records for the largest indoor mural, which he painted at the Vegas World casino (since demolished and replaced by the Stratosphere casino) in Las Vegas.

== Selected artworks ==
=== Album covers ===
Genesis
- 1970 Trespass
- 1971 Nursery Cryme
- 1972 Foxtrot
- 1973 Genesis Live (title lettering only)
Van der Graaf Generator
- 1970 H to He, Who Am the Only One
- 1971 Pawn Hearts
Peter Hammill
- 1971 Fool's Mate
- 1973 Chameleon in the Shadow of the Night
Le Orme
- 1975 Smogmagica
- 2001 Elementi
- 2004 L'infinito
Alex Carpani
- 2004 Waterline
- 2010 The Sanctuary
Other

- 1968 Johnny Hallyday – Rêve et Amour
- 1969 High Tide – Sea Shanties
- 1971 Renaissance – Illusion
- 1975 Tom Fogerty - Myopia
- 2001 Submarine Silence - Submarine Silence
- 2004 Various artists - The Colossus of Rhodes
- 2004 Systems Theory - Soundtracks for Imaginary Movies
- 2006 Akacia - Fading Time
- 2007 Systems Theory - Codetalkers
- 2007 Holding Pattern - Breaking the Silence
- 2013 Days Between Stations - In Extremis
- 2014 Gnu Quartet - Karma
- 2016 Ilenia Volpe - Mondo al contrario
- 2018 Fernando Perdomo - Out to Sea
- 2018 Robbie Gennet - Gleams
- 2019 Fernando Perdomo - Out to Sea 2
- 2020 Fernando Perdomo - Out to Sea 3

=== Miscellaneous ===
- 1977 "Solar Carte" (mural)
- 1978 Armando Gallo - Genesis: The Evolution of a Rock Band (book cover)
- 2001 Kevin Holm-Hudson - Progressive Rock Reconsidered (book cover "Storm In a Teacup")
