= PH7 =

PH7 may refer to:

- The center of the pH scale, describing a solution in water that is neither basic nor acidic.
- pH7 (Peter Hammill album), an album by Peter Hammill
