= Paul Whitehead (disambiguation) =

Paul Whitehead is a British painter and graphic artist known for his surrealistic album covers.

Paul Whitehead may also refer to:

- Paul Whitehead (satirist) (1710–1774), member of the notorious 18th-century Hellfire Club
- Paul Whitehead (politician), American politician who stood for the Republican party in the United States House of Representatives elections, 2004
