= The Appointed Hour =

Studio album by Roger Eno and Peter Hammill
- Released: November 22, 1999
- Recorded: April 1999
- Genre: Ambient
- Length: 59:55
- Label: Fie! Records
- Producer: Roger Eno, Peter Hammill

Roger Eno chronology
Damage (1999)	The Appointed Hour (1999)	The Long Walk (2000)

Peter Hammill chronology
Typical (1999)	The Appointed Hour (1999)	None of the Above (2000)

Professional ratings
Review scores
Source	Rating
Allmusic	4.5/5 stars

The Appointed Hour is a collaborative album by singer and guitarist Peter Hammill and ambient musician Roger Eno. It was released in January 2001 by Fie! Records.

The music on the album was based on an agreement between Roger Eno and Peter Hammill that they both would improvise for one hour on a previously agreed upon time (1 April 1999, between 13:00 and 14:00 GMT). The only pre-arrangement was that both musicians would start in D minor, but other than that neither of them knew what the other was doing. The album was created by adding the two recordings together (and deleting only some of it - according to Hammill there are no overdubs).

== Track listing ==
All tracks written by Roger Eno and Peter Hammill.

1. "Up" – 2:34
2. "Are They" – 2:01
3. "Your Heart" – 5:57
4. "And Let This" – 2:25
5. "Wise Men" – 4:01
6. "So How" – 1:43
7. "To Know" – 1:40
8. "Fools" – 3:32
9. "In" – 1:14
10. "Where" – 2:59
11. "To Tread" – 2:01
12. "Fool Rush" – 2:56
13. "Fear" – 3:22
14. "Open" – 1:34
15. "Never" – 3:36
16. "Rush In" – 0:57
17. "But" – 3:11
18. "In Love" – 5:13
19. "Angels" – 5:02
20. "Fall" – 4:09
