= Spur of the Moment =

Spur of the Moment may refer to:

- "Spur of the Moment" (The Twilight Zone), an episode of the American television anthology series The Twilight Zone
- Spur of the Moment (album), a 1988 album by Peter Hammill and Guy Evans
- Spur of the Moment (film), a 1931 Australian film directed by A.R. Harwood
- Spur of the Moment (play), a 2010 play by Anya Reiss
