= Fool's Mate (album) =

Studio album by Peter Hammill
- Released: July 1971
- Recorded: 20–28 April 1971
- Studios: Trident, London
- Genre: Art rock
- Length: 44:28
- Label: Charisma
- Producer: John Anthony

Peter Hammill chronology
Fool's Mate (1971)	Chameleon in the Shadow of the Night (1973)

Fool's Mate is the debut solo album by Peter Hammill of progressive rock band Van der Graaf Generator. The title is both a chess and tarot reference. It was produced by Trident Studios' in-house producer John Anthony. The album was recorded in 1971, in the midst of one of Van der Graaf Generator's most prolific periods. Hammill used the album to record a backlog of songs which were much shorter and simpler than his Van der Graaf Generator material, and declared on the original album sleeve: "This isn't intended to be any kind of statement of my present musical position, but at the same time, it is an album which involves a great deal of me, the person, basically a return to the roots."

Guest musicians on the album included the members of Van der Graaf Generator, members of his label mates Lindisfarne, and guitarist Robert Fripp.

Fool's Mate includes one of Hammill's most celebrated love songs, "Vision", which he still performs in concert. Both "Vision" and "The Birds" were re-worked for Hammill's 1984 album The Love Songs.

In 2005 Fool's Mate was issued in remastered form by EMI Virgin Records, supplemented with bonus demo recordings of several songs.

== Cover art ==
The cover was designed by Paul Whitehead, who at the time was the favourite cover artist for Van der Graaf Generator and fellow Charisma band Genesis.

== Background and recording ==
Fool's Mate is a collection of songs written over four years (from 1967 through 1971) which fell into a lighter, more mellow vein than that of Hammill's band Van der Graaf Generator. Realizing that the songs would never be recorded by Van der Graaf Generator, Hammill asked Charisma Records president Tony Stratton-Smith, who was also Van der Graaf Generator's manager, if he could record a solo album. The entire album was recorded in a single two-day session at Trident Studios, in between Van der Graaf Generator tour dates.

Two drummers perform on the album: Guy Evans and Martin Pottinger. On each track, one or the other is featured. On "Imperial Zeppelin," they both play.

== Reception ==
Professional ratings
Review scores
Source	Rating
Allmusic	3/5 stars

The UK music press was generally very positive about Fool's Mate. Melody Maker saw it as "one of THE albums of the year".

Paul Stump, in his History of Progressive Rock, called Fool's Mate "a revamped corpus of pre-Van der Graaf Generator and pre-university songs of plumptious psychedelic pop hedging its bets between Syd Barrett and Al Stewart." He remarked that some of the songs seem more like "warm-up exercises" for longer, better works, but he found the tunes "Summer Song in Autumn" and "Sunshine" very catchy and pleasing, and praised the "spine-tingling" three-part organ chord which concludes the album.

== Track listing ==
All tracks composed by Peter Hammill, except "Imperial Zeppelin" and "Viking" co-written with Chris Judge Smith.

Side one
No.	Title	Length
1.	"Imperial Zeppelin"	3:36
2.	"Candle"	4:16
3.	"Happy"	2:36
4.	"Solitude"	4:56
5.	"Vision"	3:13
6.	"Re-Awakening"	4:01
Total length:		22:41

Side two
No.	Title	Length
7.	"Sunshine"	3:54
8.	"Child"	4:20
9.	"Summer Song In The Autumn"	2:14
10.	"Viking"	4:41
11.	"The Birds"	3:35
12.	"I Once Wrote Some Poems"	2:43
Total length:		21:53

Bonus tracks on 2005 reissue
No.	Title	Length
13.	"Re-Awakening" (Demo)	4:33
14.	"Summer Song In The Autumn" (Demo)	2:46
15.	"The Birds" (Demo)	3:18
16.	"Sunshine" (Demo)	3:50
17.	"Happy" (Demo)	2:46

== Personnel ==
Adapted from liner notes.

- Peter Hammill – all lead vocals (1–12); acoustic guitar, piano (1–4, 6–10, 12)
- Robert Fripp – electric guitar (1, 7, 8, 10–12)
- Guy Evans – drums, percussion (1, 3, 6, 7, 9, 11)
- Martin Pottinger – drums (1, 2, 4, 10)
- Hugh Banton – piano, organ (1, 3, 5–9, 11)
- Rod Clements – bass, violin (2, 4, 10)
- Nic Potter – bass (1, 3, 6–9, 11)
- Ray Jackson – harp, mandolin (2, 4, 10)
- David Jackson – alto and tenor saxophones, flute (1, 3, 6–8, 10)
- Paul Whitehead – tam tam (10)
- Fluctuating Chorale: Guy, Hugh, Dave, Ray, John, Norman, Alastair, John, Peter

=== Technical ===
- John Anthony – producer
- Robin Cable – engineer (Trident Studios, London)
- Paul Whitehead – artwork
- Sebastian Rich – photography
