= In Camera (Peter Hammill album) =

Studio album by Peter Hammill
- Released: September 1974
- Recorded: December 1973 – April 1974
- Studios: Sofa Sound, Sussex; Trident Studios, London
- Genres: Art rock, progressive rock, experimental rock
- Length: 47:47
- Label: Charisma
- Producer: Peter Hammill

Peter Hammill chronology
The Silent Corner and the Empty Stage (1974)	In Camera (1974)	Nadir's Big Chance (1975)

Professional ratings
Review scores
Source	Rating
Allmusic	3/5 stars

In Camera is the fourth solo album from the English singer-songwriter Peter Hammill. It was released in September 1974.

Much of the material was recorded in Hammill's home studio on simple four-track equipment. He then took the tapes to Trident Studios, where additional elements such as drumming from Van der Graaf Generator colleague Guy Evans, and layers of ARP 2600 analogue synthesizer were added. The album has a predominantly dark, gothic, claustrophobic feel, with the lyrics laced with apocalyptic, religious and existential imagery. "Gog" is a particularly intense and demonic song, featuring (even by Hammill's standards) strident and aggressive vocals, grandiose harmonium chords, and powerful drumming. This segués into "Magog", which is virtually a musique concrète piece of sinister drones, percussive noises, and including a ring modulated spoken vocal. Songs such as "Ferret and Featherbird" and "Again" are gentler offerings, and Hammill refers to the first as "something approaching a 'sweet' song". The album was dedicated to Hammill's brother, Andrew.

"Again" was re-worked for Hammill's 1984 album The Love Songs.

== Track listing ==
All tracks are written by Peter Hammill.

Side one
No.	Title	Length
1.	"Ferret and Featherbird"	3:43
2.	"(No More) the Sub-mariner"	5:47
3.	"Tapeworm"	4:20
4.	"Again"	3:44
5.	"Faint-Heart and the Sermon"	6:42
Total length:		24:26

Side two
No.	Title	Length
6.	"The Comet, the Course, the Tail"	6:00
7.	"Gog"	7:40
8.	"Magog (in Bromine Chambers)"	9:41
Total length:		23:21

2006 CD bonus tracks from BBC One John Peel Sessions
No.	Title	Length
9.	"The Emperor in His War Room"	6:39
10.	"Faint-Heart and the Sermon"	6:05
11.	"(No More) the Sub-mariner"	6:12

Some CDs index "Gog" and "Magog..." as one track.

== Personnel ==
- Peter Hammill – vocals, piano (1–5, 8), acoustic and electric guitars (1, 3–6, 8), bass guitar (2–4, 6, 7), ARP 2600 synthesizer (2, 5, 6, 8), Mellotron (5, 8), harmonium (7)
- Guy Evans – drums (3, 7)
- Chris Judge Smith – percussion, spoken word (8)
- Paul Whitehead – percussion (8)

=== Technical ===
- Peter Hammill – recording engineer (Sofa Sound, Sussex)
- David Hentschel – recording engineer, ARP programming, mixing, "studio wizardry" (Trident Studios, London)
