= This (Peter Hammill album) =

Studio album by Peter Hammill
- Released: October 1998
- Recorded: January – July 1998
- Studio: Terra Incognita, Bath
- Genre: Art rock
- Length: 49:47
- Label: Fie!
- Producer: Peter Hammill

Peter Hammill chronology
Everyone You Hold (1997)	This (1998)	Typical (1999)

This is the 25th studio album by Peter Hammill, released on his Fie! label in 1998. There is a large variety in the compositions, ranging from the minimalism of the final song, "The Light Continent", to the rough, almost Nadir-like sound of "Always is Next", the complex "Unrehearsed" and the ballad "Since the Kids". Peter Hammill performed the song "Unrehearsed" live many times. "Nightman" can be heard on the live-album Veracious (2006).

== Production and instrumentation ==
The album was recorded, mixed and mastered at Peter Hammill's own studio, Terra Incognita in Bath, between January and July 1998. All instruments were played and all voices sung by Hammill, except for violin and viola by Stuart Gordon, saxophones and flute by David Jackson, and drums and percussion by Manny Elias. Hammill himself regards the album as "not in any sense a 'band' disc", and considers "the unifying factors [to be] song and voice rather than instrumentation". The songs are interspersed with small instrumental fragments (according to Hammill, "their presence is essential in order to glue the whole thing together").

== Cover ==
The cover shows a tree stump and a collection of objects, signifying the passing of time. There is a tachograph disc, ripped out of the machine at high speed on one of the tours, and a picture of a wristwatch that used to belong to Hammill's father. The design was done by RidArt (Paul Ridout).

== Track listing ==
All songs written by Peter Hammill.

No.	Title	Length
1.	"Frozen In Place (Fragment)"	0:46
2.	"Unrehearsed"	7:05
3.	"Stupid"	4:26
4.	"Since The Kids"	5:57
5.	"Nightman"	6:17
6.	"Fallen (The City Of Night)"	5:37
7.	"Unready (Fragment)"	0:43
8.	"Always Is Next"	3:59
9.	"Unsteady (Fragment)"	0:58
10.	"The Light Continent"	14:03

== Personnel ==
All instruments and voices by Peter Hammill except:

- Manny Elias – drums & percussion (2, 3, 6, 8)
- Stuart Gordon – violin & viola (2, 5, 6, 7, 8, 9, 10)
- David Jackson – saxophones & flute (2, 3, 5, 8, 10)

=== Technical ===
- Peter Hammill – recording engineer, mixing (Terra Incognita, Bath)
- Paul Ridout – design & art direction
