= ...All That Might Have Been... =

Studio album by Peter Hammill
- Released: November 2014
- Genre: Experimental, art rock
- Length: 47:32
- Label: Fie!
- Producer: Peter Hammill

Peter Hammill chronology
Other World (2014)	...All That Might Have Been... (2014)	From the Trees (2017)

...All That Might Have Been... is British singer-songwriter Peter Hammill's 34th solo album, released on his own Fie! Records in November 2014. Similarly to 2004's Incoherence, on the standard edition of the album there is only one epic, multi-part song. The special edition box contains two additional discs with bonus material.

== Track listing ==
All songs written by Peter Hammill.

=== Disc One - The Cine ===
1. "In Overview" (2:48)
2. "The Last Time" (1:42)
3. "Never Wanted" (2:16)
4. "As for Him" (1:52)
5. "Nowhere Special" (1:38)
6. "Piper Smile" (1:13)
7. "Wanted to Belong" (1:52)
8. "This Might..." (1:51)
9. "Inklings, Darling" (3:31)
10. "Be Careful" (1:38)
11. "Alien Clock" (5:52)
12. "Drifting Through" (2:16)
13. "Washed Up" (2:07)
14. "Rumpled Sheets" (3:02)
15. "Fool-Proof" (1:50)
16. "Can't Get Home" (1:48)
17. "Washed Away" (1:41)
18. "Back Road" (2:12)
19. "The Line Goes Dead" (2:01)
20. "He Turns Away" (1:58)
21. "Hooks" (2:14)

Disc Two - The Songs
No.	Title	Length
1.	"Upon A Sixpence"	4:58
2.	"Someday (The Piper Smile)"	5:02
3.	"Vai Lentissimo"	5:11
4.	"Disrespect (In Kabuki-Cho)"	6:16
5.	"An Outlier"	5:43
6.	"The Whole Thing Through"	3:50
7.	"Best Wishes"	4:16
8.	"Passing Clouds"	4:37
9.	"Not Going Anywhere"	4:34
10.	"Until"	4:28

Disc Three - The Retro
No.	Title	Length
1.	"SixSlowOut"	9:11
2.	"KabukiCloudSome"	7:19
3.	"TenorElseAny"	6:39
4.	"57WishesUntil"	7:46

== Personnel ==
- Peter Hammill – vocals, all instruments

=== Technical ===
- Peter Hammill – recording engineer, mixing (Terra Incognita, Wiltshire)
- Paul Ridout – design, photography, artwork
