= In a Foreign Town =

Studio album by Peter Hammill
- Released: 21 November 1988
- Recorded: October 1987 – January 1988
- Genre: Art rock
- Length: 45:00
- Label: Enigma
- Producer: Peter Hammill

Peter Hammill chronology
Spur of the Moment (1988)	In a Foreign Town (1988)	Out of Water (1990)

Professional ratings
Review scores
Source	Rating
AllMusic	3/5 stars
Q	4/5 stars

In a Foreign Town is the 16th studio album by the English singer-songwriter Peter Hammill. It was originally released in 1988 on Enigma Records, and was subsequently reissued on Hammill's own Fie! label.

Reactions to the album are mixed due largely to the rather dated 1980s rhythm tracks and production. However, others value it highly because it is one of Hammill's most politically engaged albums, covering such topics as apartheid ("Sun City Nightlife"), big business ("Sci-Finance (Revisited)" – a reworking of "Sci-Finance", the Van der Graaf song from Vital) and global politics ("Hemlock"). "Time to Burn" was a goodbye to Tony Stratton Smith who had died just prior to this. The song "This Book" is a cover of the song "Abrir y Cerrar" that appeared on the album "Bandido" by the Spanish artist Miguel Bosé, published by CBS in 1986. In this production Peter Hammil is credited as co-writer of other songs.

Last two tracks appear only on CD releases.

== Track listing ==
All tracks written by Peter Hammill; except where indicated

No.	Title	Writer(s)	Length
1.	"Hemlock"		6:29
2.	"Invisible Ink"		4:19
3.	"Sci-Finance (Revisited)"		4:22
4.	"This Book"	Gianpiero Ameli, Peter Hammill, Roberto Colombo	5:14
5.	"Time To Burn"		3:44
6.	"Auto"		3:58
7.	"Vote Brand X"		4:03
8.	"Sun City Night Life"		4:34
9.	"The Play's The Thing"		4:54
10.	"Under Cover Names"		4:19
11.	"Smile"	Herbert Grönemeyer, Peter Hammill	5:18
12.	"Time To Burn (Instrumental)"		3:43

== Personnel ==
- Peter Hammill – vocals, guitar, keyboards, percussion
- Stuart Gordon – violin on (1)

=== Technical ===
- Peter Hammill – recording engineer (Sofa Sound, Avon)
- Paul Ridout – engineer, artwork
- David Lord – mixing (Crescent Studios, Bath)
- Paul Ridout – cover design
- Armando Gallo, Hilary Hammill – photography
