= A Black Box =

Studio album by Peter Hammill
- Released: August 1980
- Recorded: November 1979 – April 1980
- Studio: Sofa Sound, Wiltshire
- Genre: Art rock
- Length: 41:31
- Label: S-Type
- Producer: Peter Hammill

Peter Hammill chronology
pH7 (1979)	A Black Box (1980)	Sitting Targets (1981)

Professional ratings
Review scores
Source	Rating
AllMusic	3/5 stars
Record Mirror	(elusive)

A Black Box is the ninth studio album by Peter Hammill, released on S-Type Records in August 1980.

Hammill performed nearly all the instrumentation himself, including the drum parts, a task he had first undertaken on his previous album pH7. His ex-Van der Graaf Generator colleague David Jackson also made a guest appearance, along with David Ferguson of the new-wave band Random Hold, whose debut album Hammill had produced.

Side 1 of the record featured a collection of songs, while side 2 was devoted to "Flight", a lengthy multi-section song. This was the first time Hammill had included a lengthy song of this type on one of his solo albums.

The short-lived S-Type label (the name was a pun on "stereo-type"), on which the album was originally released, was set up by Hammill and his then manager Gail Colson. Colson had formerly been a director at Hammill's previous record company, Charisma Records, who had dropped him from their roster just prior to the recording of A Black Box. The S-Type label does not appear to have been a successful business project, and the album was later licensed to Virgin Records, which has since also acquired Hammill's Charisma catalogue.

== Track listing ==
All songs written by Peter Hammill, except where noted.

Side one
No.	Title	Writer(s)	Length
1.	"Golden Promises"		2:55
2.	"Losing Faith in Words"		3:38
3.	"Jargon King"		2:43
4.	"Fogwalking"		4:06
5.	"The Spirit"		2:38
6.	"In Slow Time"	Hammill, David Ferguson	3:26
7.	"The Wipe"		1:51
Total length:			21:15

Side two
No.	Title	Length
1.	"Flight": I. "Flying Blind"; II. "The White Cane Fandango"; III. "Control"; IV. "Cockpit"; V. "Silk-Worm Wings"; VI. "Nothing Is Nothing"; VII. "A Black Box"	19:37
Total length:		19:37

== Personnel ==
- Peter Hammill – vocals, guitar, keyboards, drums, bass
- David Jackson – saxophone, flute on 4 and 8
- David Ferguson – synthesizer and tambourine on 4, 6 and 7

=== Technical ===
- Peter Hammill – recording engineer (Sofa Sound, Wiltshire)
- David Lord – mixing (Crescent Studios, Bath)
