= Incoherence (album) =

Studio album by Peter Hammill
- Released: March 2004
- Recorded: March–December 2003
- Genre: Art rock
- Length: 41:38
- Label: Fie!
- Producer: Peter Hammill

Peter Hammill chronology
Clutch (2002)	Incoherence (2004)	Singularity (2006)

Incoherence is the 30th studio album by Peter Hammill, released on his Fie! label in March 2004. Incoherence is a concept album about language, containing 14 tracks with soft transitions between them. The album was produced and played by Hammill himself, with contributions from Stuart Gordon on violin and David Jackson on flute and saxophones. Incoherence is recognized by critics as ambitious and one of Hammill's major works.

== Production and instrumentation ==
Incoherence is Hammill's fourth (either with Van der Graaf Generator or solo) long piece of music with continuous transitions between sections which can be identified as single songs. At 41 minutes, however, it is twice as long as the earlier examples, "A Plague of Lighthouse Keepers" (1971 with Van der Graaf Generator), "Flight" (1980) and "A Headlong Stretch" (1994).

Musically, the 14 sections vary widely from calm, harmonic songs to difficult and highly demanding sections, tied together by Hammill's unusual voice, a focus on keyboards and the concept of the album: language.

Incoherence was produced in Hammill's studio Terra Incognita in Wiltshire between March and September 2003. Hammill completed the mixing of the album just two days before he suffered a heart attack in December 2003.

The instrumentation of Incoherence is complex and symphonic, but never overdone and leaving some rather simple musical structures, mainly in the beginning and the end. Beneath keyboards in classical as well as in processed forms, Hammill used guitars, backing vocals and some overdubs by the violins of Stuart Gordon and the saxophones of David Jackson. This kind of instrumentation was Hammill's main form of producing since the 1990s, but this time with an even higher level of complexity and without the use of drums.

== Lyrics ==
In Incoherence Hammill discusses the contradictions and shortcomings of language, given that "our capacities for communication and comprehension define us both socially and personally". In multi-levelled ways, the words of this album describe the "incoherent" use and the impossibilities of words. It has been argued that Peter Hammill referenced the infamous Iraq speech of Tony Blair.

== Cover ==
The cover, designed by Paul Ridout, shows corroded and burnt surfaces with lines of text. Folded out, the booklet contains a tower built with the lines of the songs of Incoherence, a reference to the Tower of Babel.

== Reception ==
Professional ratings
Review scores
Source	Rating
Allmusic	4/5 stars

Critics received Incoherence favourably, speaking of a "major work, challenging pop's conventional limits yet again" (The Independent), being "Hammill's most ambitious undertaking since 'Flight', and representing a high mark in the man's artistic creativity" (Allmusic). It was also pointed out that Incoherence "demands absorption throughout time and repeated listens" (Maelstrom).

== Track listing ==
All songs written by Peter Hammill. Hammill himself refers to the album as "a continuous 41 minute + piece".

No.	Title	Length
1.	"When Language Corrodes"	2:47
2.	"Babel"	4:36
3.	"Logodaedalus"	2:18
4.	"Like Perfume"	1:32
5.	"Your Word"	1:09
6.	"Always And A Day"	2:09
7.	"Cretans Always Lie"	3:25
8.	"All Greek"	4:15
9.	"Call That A Conversation?"	3:14
10.	"The Meanings Changed"	1:57
11.	"Converse"	2:10
12.	"Gone Ahead"	5:40
13.	"Power Of Speech"	2:42
14.	"If Language Explodes"	3:47

== Personnel ==
- Peter Hammill - vocals, instruments
- Stuart Gordon - violins
- David Jackson - saxophones, flutes

=== Technical ===
- Peter Hammill - recording engineer, mixing (Terra Incognita, Bath)
- Paul Ridout - design, art direction
