= Chameleon in the Shadow of the Night =

Studio album by Peter Hammill
- Released: 4 May 1973
- Recorded: February and March 1973
- Studio: Sofa Sound, Sussex; Rockfield Studios, Monmouthshire; Trident Studios, London
- Genre: Progressive rock, psychedelic rock
- Length: 50:21
- Label: Charisma
- Producer: John Anthony

Peter Hammill chronology
Fool's Mate (1971)	Chameleon in the Shadow of the Night (1973)	The Silent Corner and the Empty Stage (1974)

Professional ratings
Review scores
Source	Rating
AllMusic	3/5 stars

Chameleon in the Shadow of the Night is the second solo album by British singer-songwriter Peter Hammill. It followed in the aftermath of the breakup of Hammill's band Van der Graaf Generator, and (as with many of Hammill's solo albums from this period) other ex-members of Van der Graaf Generator perform on the album.

The album was produced by John Anthony at Rockfield Studios, Wales, for the first time using pre-recorded parts done by Peter Hammill in his home studio in Worth. For final mixing the then much better equipped Trident Studios were used. The album was released in May 1973 on Charisma Records.

Some of the songs ("German Overalls" and "In the End") relate to Van der Graaf Generator's decision to split, following an exhausting, demoralising and poverty-stricken experience of being a touring rock band. "German Overalls" name-checks bandmates Hugh Banton and David Jackson.

Hammill has continued to perform "Easy to Slip Away" in concert to the present day. The song relates to him losing touch with student housemates Mike and actress Susan Penhaligon (who were also namechecked in the Van der Graaf Generator song "Refugees").

The complex and atmospheric "(In the) Black Room/The Tower" was originally planned for inclusion on Van der Graaf Generator's album following Pawn Hearts, an album that because of the band's split never came to be. But the song was already performed on stage by Van der Graaf Generator in 1972, and a recording of it from July 1972 rehearsals (albeit in bad audio quality) is included on the compilation Time Vaults. The album version from Chameleon in the Shadow of the Night features Van der Graaf Generator's ex-members Banton, Jackson and Evans. Later, when the band reformed in 1975 and 1976, "(In the) Black Room" was again part of their live sets, and also during their 2005 reunion.

== Cover ==
The cover was designed by Paul Whitehead, who also was the artist for Fool's Mate as well as sleeves for Van der Graaf Generator (The Least We Can Do is Wave to Each Other and Pawn Hearts) and Charisma labelmates Genesis (Trespass, Nursery Cryme and Foxtrot). It shows Peter Hammill's astrological sign Scorpio twice, as a painting of a real scorpion and as part of a personal logo which Hammill introduced with this album and which would appear on the covers of many coming releases. The photo of Hammill on the front side was taken by Bettina Hohls in Hamburg.

== Track listing ==
All tracks are written by Peter Hammill

Side one
No.	Title	Length
1.	"German Overalls"	7:04
2.	"Slender Threads"	4:57
3.	"Rock and Rôle"	6:41
4.	"In the End"	7:21
Total length:		26:03

Side two
No.	Title	Length
5.	"What's it Worth"	3:56
6.	"Easy to Slip Away"	5:18
7.	"Dropping the Torch"	4:11
8.	"(In the) Black Room/The Tower"	10:53
Total length:		24:18

2006 CD reissue bonus tracks
No.	Title	Notes	Length
9.	"Rain 3 AM"	Recorded during studio sessions	4:45
10.	"Easy to Slip Away"	Live at the All Souls Unitarian Church, Kansas City, on 16 February 1978	4:47
11.	"In the End"	Live at the All Souls Unitarian Church, Kansas City, on 16 February 1978	7:23

== Personnel ==
- Peter Hammill – vocals, acoustic and electric guitars (1–3, 5, 7), piano (3, 4, 6, 8), Mellotron (6), harmonium (credited with "tesseraschizoid warbling...one flight of mellotrons and some Gothic harmonium")
- Hugh Banton – Hammond organ (8), piano, bass pedals, bass guitar (credited with "Bomber, banshee, organ and leaping piano, foot and hand bass, the Rack")
- Guy Evans – drums, cymbals (3, 8) (credited with "The Thundering Horseman of the Darkest Dawn")
- David Jackson – acoustic and electric tenor and alto saxophone, flute (1, 3, 5, 6, 8) (credited with "screams in the night and icy waterfalls")
- Nic Potter – bass guitar (3, 6) (credited with "Cortina")

=== Technical ===
- John Anthony – producer
- Peter Hammill – recording engineer (Sofa Sound, Sussex)
- Pat Moran, Ralph Down – recording engineers (Rockfield Studios, Monmouth)
- David Hentschel – mixing (Trident Studios, London)
- Paul Whitehead – artwork
- John Pasche – art direction
- Bettina Hohls – photography
