= The Silent Corner and the Empty Stage =

The Silent Corner and The Empty Stage

Studio album by Peter Hammill
- Released: 8 February 1974
- Recorded: April, September and October 1973
- Studio: Sofa Sound (Sussex); Rockfield (Rockfield, Wales); Trident (London)
- Genre: Progressive rock, psychedelic rock
- Length: 49:50
- Label: Charisma Records
- Producer: Peter Hammill

Peter Hammill chronology
Chameleon in the Shadow of the Night (1973)	The Silent Corner and The Empty Stage (1974)	In Camera (1974)

Professional ratings
Review scores
Source	Rating
Allmusic	3/5 stars
Julian Cope's Unsung	(timeless)

The Silent Corner and the Empty Stage is the third album by British singer-songwriter Peter Hammill. It was released on Charisma Records in 1974, during a hiatus in the activities of Hammill's progressive rock band Van der Graaf Generator. Other ex-members of Van der Graaf Generator also perform on the recording.

The cover was designed by Bettina Hohls, ex-member of the psychedelic German rock band Ash Ra Tempel. Hohls also contributed to the cover of Hammill's earlier album Chameleon in the Shadow of the Night.

The lengthy "A Louse is not a Home" is a song about the nature of identity. It was originally written for Van der Graaf Generator's album following Pawn Hearts, an album that because of the band's split never came to be. It features Van der Graaf Generator's ex-members and was (just like "In the Black Room" from the previous album) played live by the group already in mid 1972 (just before the split) and again with the reformed band in 1975. "Forsaken Gardens" (also played live in 1975) and "Red Shift" are two more songs which feature ex-VdGG members. "The Lie (Bernini's Saint Theresa)" partly alludes to the Ecstasy of St Theresa by Bernini. "Red Shift" features Spirit guitarist Randy California on lead guitar. Hammill has often performed the song "Modern" in concert. "Wilhelmina" is written for Guy Evans' newborn baby girl, Tamra.

== Track listing ==
All tracks are written by Peter Hammill

Side one
No.	Title	Length
1.	"Modern"	7:28
2.	"Wilhelmina"	5:18
3.	"The Lie (Bernini's Saint Theresa)"	5:41
4.	"Forsaken Gardens"	6:16
Total length:		24:43

Side two
No.	Title	Length
5.	"Red Shift"	8:11
6.	"Rubicon"	4:41
7.	"A Louse is Not a Home"	12:15
Total length:		25:07

2006 CD reissue bonus tracks
No.	Title	Notes	Length
8.	"The Lie (Bernini's Saint Theresa)"	Live at the All Souls Unitarian Church, Kansas City, on 16 February 1978	6:31
9.	"Rubicon"	BBC session, February 1974	5:02
10.	"Red Shift"	BBC session, February 1974	5:51

== Personnel ==
- Peter Hammill – vocals, electric and acoustic guitars (1, 2, 5, 6), piano (2, 3, 4, 7), Mellotron (1, 2), bass guitar (1, 2, 6), harmonium (1), oscillator (6)
- Hugh Banton – Hammond organ, bass pedals and bass guitar (3, 4, 7), Farfisa organ (5), backing vocals
- Guy Evans – percussion, drums (4, 5, 7)
- David Jackson – flute, alto, tenor, and soprano saxophones (4, 5, 7)
- Randy California – lead guitar (5)

=== Technical ===
- Peter Hammill – recording engineer (Sofa Sound, Sussex)
- Pat Moran – recording engineer (Rockfield Studios, Monmouth)
- David Hentschel – mixing (Trident Studios, London)
- Bettina Hohls – artwork
