= Thin Air (album) =

Studio album by Peter Hammill
- Released: June 2009
- Recorded: August 2008 – March 2009
- Genre: Art rock
- Length: 46:48
- Label: Fie!
- Producer: Peter Hammill

Peter Hammill chronology
Singularity (2006)	Thin Air (2009)	Consequences (2012)

Professional ratings
Review scores
Source	Rating
Allmusic	4/5 stars
BBC Music	(favourable)

Thin Air is British singer-songwriter Peter Hammill's 32nd solo album, released on his own Fie! Records label in June 2009. It was additionally made available as digital download through Burning Shed Records.

As on his previous release, Singularity, Hammill played all instruments, wrote all the songs and produced the album.

The main theme of the album is disappearance, as Hammill told British music magazine Mojo in February 2009: "it became apparent fairly quickly that strong thematic links were running through the songs' lyrics: disappearance, change, loss, dislocation in various forms were stitched through all of them."

Another topic reappearing in several songs is that of the World Trade Center along with images of planes, though Hammill denied "any direct" reference to 9/11.

According to François Couture of AllMusic, Thin Air: "... may be less experimental than Singularity, but bleaker – and a more cohesive, consistent artistic proposition." The songs contain "almost no percussion, just acoustic guitars, piano, some gnarly electric guitar lines, bass, and those massed and intertwined back vocals that have become his signature".

The album's cover was again created by Paul Ridout, using stills from his video work "Minutely Observed Horizon".

== Your Face on the Street ==
While living in Bath, Hammill had the inspiration for the song "Your Face on the Street" from the disappearance of Melanie Hall in the same city. Some of the song's lyrics were written at the time of Hall's disappearance, and when the album came out, the discovery of her remains had yet to be made.

== Track listing ==
All tracks composed by Peter Hammill

No.	Title	Length
1.	"The Mercy"	6:22
2.	"Your Face On The Street"	5:22
3.	"Stumbled"	4:48
4.	"Wrong Way Round"	2:41
5.	"Ghosts Of Planes"	5:24
6.	"If We Must Part Like This"	4:38
7.	"Undone"	4:25
8.	"Diminished"	6:11
9.	"The Top Of The World Club"	7:04

== Personnel ==
- Peter Hammill – vocals, instruments, author

=== Technical ===
- Peter Hammill – recording engineer, mixing (Terra Incognita, Wiltshire)
- Paul Ridout – design, photography
