= Other World (album) =

Otherworld

Studio album by Peter Hammill & Gary Lucas
- Released: February 3, 2014
- Recorded: January–June 2013
- Genre: Progressive rock
- Length: 59:51
- Label: Esoteric Recordings
- Producer: Peter Hammill, Gary Lucas

Peter Hammill chronology
Consequences (2012)	Otherworld (2014)	...All That Might Have Been... (2014)

Gary Lucas chronology
The Ordeal of Civility (2011)	Otherworld (2014)

Professional ratings
Review scores
Source	Rating
Allmusic	4/5 stars

Otherworld is a collaborative album by English singer Peter Hammill and American guitarist Gary Lucas. It was released in February 2014 by Esoteric Recordings.

Although on the album cover the title is spelled as "Other World", on Peter Hammill's official website Sofa Sound the title is spelled as one word, "Otherworld".

== Track listing ==
All songs written by Gary Lucas and Peter Hammill.

No.	Title	Length
1.	"Spinning Coins"	2:54
2.	"Some Kind Of Fracas"	5:15
3.	"Of Kith & Kin"	5:30
4.	"Cash"	2:56
5.	"Built From Scratch"	4:26
6.	"Attar Of Roses"	4:19
7.	"This Is Showbiz"	3:05
8.	"Reboot"	6:56
9.	"Black Ice"	4:59
10.	"The Kid"	4:17
11.	"Glass"	3:27
12.	"2 Views"	3:07
13.	"Means To An End"	1:37
14.	"Slippery Slope"	7:03

== Personnel ==
- Peter Hammill – guitars, instruments, vocals
- Gary Lucas – guitars

=== Technical ===
- Peter Hammill – recording engineer, mixing (Terra Incognita, Wiltshire)
- Paul Ridout – design
