= Consequences (Peter Hammill album) =

Studio album by Peter Hammill
- Released: 16 April 2012
- Genre: Art rock
- Length: 50:27
- Label: Fie!
- Producer: Peter Hammill

Peter Hammill chronology
Thin Air (2009)	Consequences (2012)	Other World (2014)

Professional ratings
Review scores
Source	Rating
Allmusic	4/5 stars

Consequences is British singer-songwriter Peter Hammill's 33rd solo album, released on his own Fie! Records label in April 2012. As on his previous release, Thin Air, Hammill played all instruments, wrote all the songs and produced the album.

== Track listing ==
No.	Title	Length
1.	"Eat My Words, Bite My Tongue"	5:29
2.	"That Wasn't What I Said"	5:18
3.	"Constantly Overheard"	4:18
4.	"New Pen-pal"	4:04
5.	"Close To Me"	4:05
6.	"All The Tiredness"	5:54
7.	"Perfect Pose"	7:02
8.	"Scissors"	5:17
9.	"Bravest Face"	4:39
10.	"A Run Of Luck"	3:55

== Personnel ==
- Peter Hammill – vocals, guitars, percussions, keyboards

=== Technical ===
- Peter Hammill – recording engineer, mixing (Terra Incognita, Wiltshire)
- Paul Ridout – design, photography, artwork
