= And Close As This =

Studio album by Peter Hammill
- Released: 3 November 1986
- Recorded: 7 August – 15 September 1986
- Genre: Art rock
- Length: 40:06
- Label: Virgin Records
- Producer: Peter Hammill

Peter Hammill chronology
| Skin (1986) | And Close As This (1986) | Spur of the Moment (1988) |

Professional ratings
Review scores
| Source | Rating |
|---|---|
| Allmusic | 4/5 stars |
| Sounds | 4.5/5 stars |
| Tentative Reviews | 4/5 stars |

And Close As This is the 14th studio album by Peter Hammill, released on Virgin Records in 1986. Each track is a song played and sung by Hammill solo at a keyboard, with the keyboard parts played in a single take. Two of the songs use a grand piano as the keyboard instrument; for the others, Hammill plays a MIDI master keyboard, using it to trigger a variety of MIDI sound modules, mainly electric piano and organ sounds. Keith Emerson collaborated as composer for the song "Empire of Delight" but did not play on the album.

== Track listing ==
All songs written by Hammill, except where indicated:

Side one
| No. | Title | Writer(s) | Length |
|---|---|---|---|
| 1. | "Too Many Of My Yesterdays" | | 4:37 |
| 2. | "Faith" | | 4:17 |
| 3. | "Empire Of Delight" | Emerson, Hammill | 4:03 |
| 4. | "Silver" | | 5:21 |
| Total length: | | | 18:48 |

Side two
| No. | Title | Length |
|---|---|---|
| 5. | "Beside The One You Love" | 5:02 |
| 6. | "Other Old Clichés" | 3:57 |
| 7. | "Confidence" | 6:27 |
| 8. | "Sleep Now" | 4:35 |
| Total length: | | 20:01 |

== Personnel ==
- Peter Hammill – vocals, grand piano, MIDI Master keyboard

=== Technical ===
- Peter Hammill – recording engineer, mixing (Sofa Sound, Bath)
- Paul Ridout – computers, MIDI
- Arun Chakraverty – original mastering
- Anton Corbijn – photography
- Phil Smee – packaging
