= X My Heart (album) =

Studio album by Peter Hammill
- Released: 18 March 1996
- Recorded: February–November 1995
- Studio: Terra Incognita, Bath
- Genre: Art rock
- Length: 50:28
- Label: Fie! Records
- Producer: Peter Hammill

Peter Hammill chronology
Roaring Forties (1994)	X My Heart (1996)	Everyone You Hold (1997)

Professional ratings
Review scores
Source	Rating
Allmusic	2.5/5 stars

X My Heart is the 22nd studio album by Peter Hammill, originally released on Hammill's own Fie! Records in 1996. It is the last of Hammill's albums to date performed in what might be described as a full band style; the later albums have been more solo and intimate in style.

Two of the songs on the album, "A Better Time" and "Amnesiac", have been performed live regularly by Hammill since the album was released.

== Track listing ==
All songs written by Peter Hammill.

No.	Title	Length
1.	"A Better Time (Acapella)"	5:14
2.	"Amnesiac"	5:36
3.	"Ram Origami"	5:28
4.	"A Forest Of Pronouns"	5:18
5.	"Earthbound"	5:23
6.	"Narcissus (Bar And Grill)"	6:45
7.	"Material Possession"	6:09
8.	"Come Clean"	5:02
9.	"A Better Time"	5:33

== Personnel ==
- Peter Hammill – vocals, guitar, keyboards, bass
- David Jackson – saxophone, flute
- Stuart Gordon – violin, viola, string arrangement
- Manny Elias – drums, percussion

=== Technical ===
- Peter Hammill – recording engineer, mixing (Terra Incognita, Bath)
- Paul Ridout – cover
