= Singularity (Peter Hammill album) =

Studio album by Peter Hammill
- Released: December 2006
- Recorded: January – August 2006
- Genre: Art rock
- Length: 44:51
- Label: Fie!
- Producer: Peter Hammill

Peter Hammill chronology
Incoherence (2004)	Singularity (2006)	Thin Air (2009)

Professional ratings
Review scores
Source	Rating
Allmusic	4/5 stars

Singularity is the 31st studio album by Peter Hammill, released on his own Fie! Records label in December 2006.

The album was the first Hammill recorded after suffering a heart attack in 2003. Some of the songs ("Our Eyes Give It Shape", "Event Horizon") refer directly to his brush with death. Others address questions of mortality in related ways ("Meanwhile My Mother" is about his mother's decline, "Friday Afternoon" about the untimely death of his piano tuner).

Unlike most recent Hammill albums, Singularity is a completely solo effort, i.e. it was written, played and produced entirely by him. It has been hailed by some as one of his best albums since the 1980s.

The cover was again designed by frequent Hammill collaborator Paul Ridout. Using a photo by Dinu and playing with the term "Singularity" it shows Peter's face on the back cover a second time as a mirror-image.

== Track listing ==
All songs written by Peter Hammill.

No.	Title	Length
1.	"Our Eyes Give It Shape"	4:33
2.	"Event Horizon"	6:04
3.	"Famous Last Word"	5:51
4.	"Naked To The Flame"	5:27
5.	"Meanwhile My Mother"	4:31
6.	"Vainglorious Boy"	5:12
7.	"Of Wire, Of Wood"	1:35
8.	"Friday Afternoon"	5:04
9.	"White Dot"	6:22

== Personnel ==
- Peter Hammill – vocals, all instruments

=== Technical ===
- Peter Hammill – recording engineer, mixing (Terra Incognita, Bath)
- Paul Ridout – cover
