= Skin (Peter Hammill album) =

Studio album by Peter Hammill
- Released: March 1986
- Recorded: 1985
- Studio: Sofa Sound and The Wool Hall
- Genre: Art rock
- Length: 38:21
- Label: Foundry
- Producer: Peter Hammill

Peter Hammill chronology
The Margin (1985)	Skin (1986)	And Close As This (1986)

Professional ratings
Review scores
Source	Rating
Allmusic	2.5/5 stars
Melody Maker	(bent on success)
Vox	(challenging)

Skin is the 13th studio album by Peter Hammill, originally released on vinyl on Foundry Records in 1986 and later re-released on CD on Virgin Records.

The album was notable for spawning a Peter Hammill single, "Painting by Numbers". The B-side was the non-album track "You Hit Me Where I Live".

The album sees Hammill employing the Yamaha DX7, the first commercially successful digital synthesiser, an instrument which was typical for the sound of the 1980s and which he plays until today. He also made use of an Emu Drumulator drum machine.

== Track listing ==
All songs by Peter Hammill, except where indicated.

Side one
No.	Title	Length
1.	"Skin"	4:12
2.	"After The Show"	4:15
3.	"Painting By Number"	4:00
4.	"Shell"	4:10
5.	"All Said And Done"	3:35
Total length:		20:12

Side two
No.	Title	Writer(s)	Length
6.	"A Perfect Date"		4:10
7.	"Four Pails"	Chris Judge Smith, Max Hutchinson	4:24
8.	"Now Lover"		9:45
Total length:			18:09

== Personnel ==
- Peter Hammill – guitar, keyboards, vocals
- Guy Evans – percussion, drums
- Hugh Banton – cello
- Stuart Gordon – violin
- David Coulter – didjeridu
- David Jackson – saxophone
- David Luckhurst – voices

=== Technical ===
- Peter Hammill – recording engineer (Sofa Sound)
- Coach, Neil Perry, Stephen Street – recording engineers, mixing (The Wool Hall, near Bath)
- Paul Ridout – engineer, cover art
- Arun Chakraverty – original mastering
