= Clutch (Peter Hammill album) =

Studio album by Peter Hammill
- Released: October 2002
- Genre: Art rock
- Length: 44:58
- Label: Fie!
- Producer: Peter Hammill

Peter Hammill chronology
| What, Now? (2001) | Clutch (2002) | Incoherence (2004) |

Professional ratings
Review scores
| Source | Rating |
|---|---|
| Allmusic | 4.5/5 stars |

Clutch is the 29th studio album by Peter Hammill, released on his Fie! label in 2002. Clutch contains nine tracks played exclusively on acoustic guitar with accompaniments on saxophones and other instruments. The album was produced and played by Hammill himself, with contributions from Stuart Gordon on violin and David Jackson on flute and saxes. In the liner notes he states that even though the instrumentation is mostly acoustic, it is not a "folk" album. As usual a lot of the songs deal with dark subject matter and his vocals are quite intense in places. The liner notes say "the palette is restricted but the canvas is broad".

== Track listing ==
All tracks composed by Peter Hammill

| No. | Title | Length |
|---|---|---|
| 1. | "We Are Written" | 3:58 |
| 2. | "Crossed Wires" | 3:44 |
| 3. | "Driven" | 3:57 |
| 4. | "Once You Called Me" | 4:44 |
| 5. | "The Ice Hotel" | 5:20 |
| 6. | "This Is The Fall" | 6:52 |
| 7. | "Just A Child" | 4:08 |
| 8. | "Skinny" | 4:48 |
| 9. | "Bareknuckle Trade" | 8:01 |

== Personnel ==
- Peter Hammill - vocals, keyboards, lead and acoustic guitars, percussion and drum programming, sequencer & other instruments
- Stuart Gordon - violins
- David Jackson - saxophones, flutes

=== Technical ===
- Peter Hammill - recording engineer, mixing (Terra Incognita, Bath)
- Paul Ridout - design, art direction
