= What, Now? (Peter Hammill album) =

Studio album by Peter Hammill
- Released: June 2001
- Genre: Art rock
- Length: 48:56
- Label: Fie!
- Producer: Peter Hammill

Peter Hammill chronology
None of the Above (2000)	What, Now? (2001)	Clutch (2002)

Professional ratings
Review scores
Source	Rating
AllMusic	3.5/5 stars

What, Now? is the 27th studio album by singer-songwriter Peter Hammill, released on his Fie! label in June 2001. According to the booklet it was "recorded, mixed and mastered at Terra Incognita, Bath between, oh, sometime in the late XXth Century and 11:23 (GMT) March 23rd 2001." It was produced by Peter Hammill.

== Track listing ==
All tracks composed by Peter Hammill.

No.	Title	Length
1.	"Here Come The Talkies"	9:41
2.	"Far-Flung (Across The Sky)"	3:21
3.	"The American Girl"	3:06
4.	"Wendy & The Lost Boy"	3:26
5.	"Lunatic In Knots"	8:04
6.	"Edge Of The Road"	10:03
7.	"Fed To The Wolves"	6:22
8.	"Enough"	4:53

== Personnel ==
All instruments and voices by Peter Hammill except:

- Stuart Gordon – violin & viola (1, 3, 5, 7)
- David Jackson – saxophones, flute & whistles (3, 6)
- Manny Elias – drums (1, 5, 6, 7)

=== Technical ===
- Peter Hammill – recording engineer, mixing (Terra Incognita, Bath)
- Paul Ridout – design, photography
