= Gail Colson =

Music manager

- Occupation: Music manager
- Organization: Gailforce Management Ltd.

Gail Colson is a retired music manager, whose company Gailforce Management Ltd. represented clients including Peter Gabriel (until December 1989), The Pretenders, Morrissey (briefly), Alison Moyet and Peter Hammill.

Colson initially worked as personal assistant to the record producer, Shel Talmy, then joined Tony Stratton Smith at Charisma Records, as label manager and joint managing director. She left to form her own company in the late 1970s, and retired in 2012.

She served on the advisory board of Music Managers Forum.

Her other clients included Random Hold, whose first album was produced by Hammill at her instigation, and the record producer, Stephen Street.

Hammill has stated that:

Gail and I never had a contract. Everything has been on the basis of trust.
