= Everyone You Hold =

Studio album by Peter Hammill
- Released: 13 October 1997
- Recorded: April 1995 – June 1997
- Genre: Art rock
- Length: 51:48
- Label: Discipline (UK)
- Producer: Peter Hammill

Peter Hammill chronology
X My Heart (1996)	Everyone You Hold (1997)	This (1998)

Professional ratings
Review scores
Source	Rating
Allmusic	3/5 stars

Everyone You Hold is the 24th studio album by Peter Hammill, released in 1997.

== Track listing ==
All tracks written by Peter Hammill except where noted.

No.	Title	Writer(s)	Length
1.	"Everyone You Hold"		5:59
2.	"Personality"	Holly Hammill, Peter Hammill	6:04
3.	"Nothing Comes"		3:56
4.	"From The Safe House"		6:13
5.	"Phosphorescence"	Peter Hammill, Saro Cosentino	5:12
6.	"Falling Open"		6:14
7.	"Bubble"		6:30
8.	"Can Do"		6:49
9.	"Tenderness"		4:51

== Personnel ==
- Peter Hammill – vocals, guitars, keyboards, bass
- David Lord – keyboards on "Everyone You Hold"
- Manny Elias – drums, percussion on "Personality", "Phosphorescence", "Can Do" and "Tenderness"
- Hugh Banton – organ on "Personality" and "Bubble"
- Beatrice and Holly Hammill – soprano vocals on "Phosphorescence"
- Stuart Gordon – violin on "Nothing Comes" and "Phosphorescence"

=== Technical ===
- Peter Hammill – recording engineer, mixing (Terra Incognita, Bath)
- Paul Ridout – design and art direction
- Leo Vaca – photography
