= Nic Potter =

English bassist, composer and painter (1951–2013)

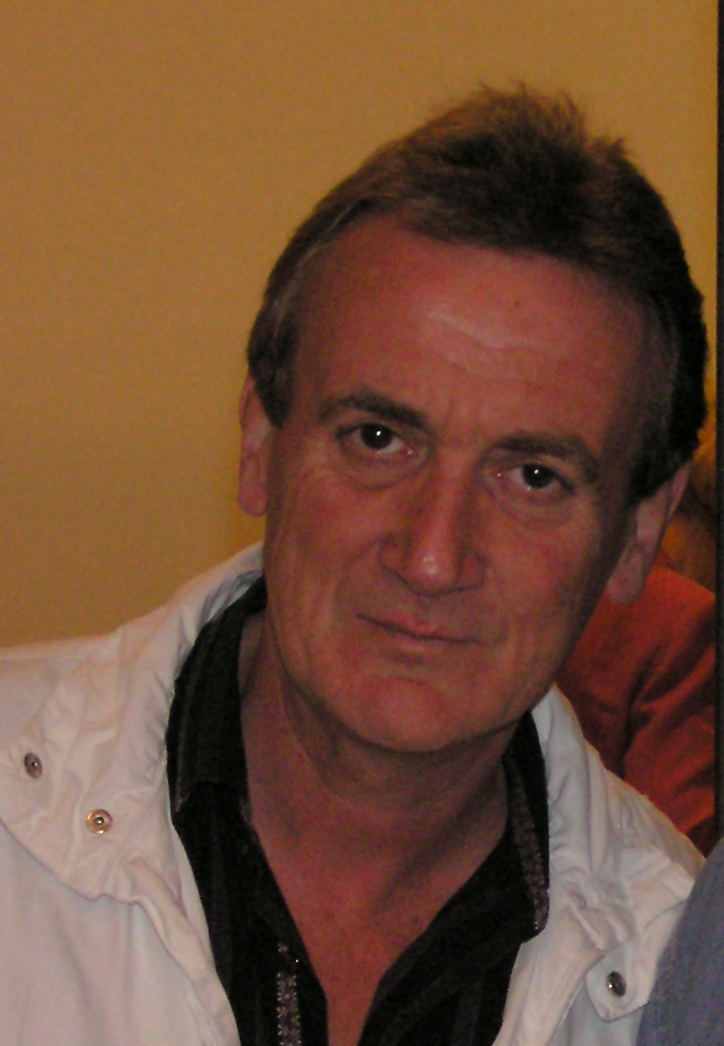
- Nic Potter in 2007

Background information
- Also known as: Mozart
- Born: Nic Potter; 18 October 1951; Wiltshire, England
- Died: 16 January 2013 (aged 61) London, England
- Occupations: Bassist, composer
- Instruments: Bass guitar, electric guitar
- Years active: 1968–2013

Nic Potter (18 October 1951 – 16 January 2013) was an English bassist, composer and painter, best known for his work with the group Van der Graaf Generator in the 1970s.

== Biography ==
Nic Potter was born in Wiltshire and left school at 15, originally to train in carpentry. His older sister Sally is a well-known film director. At the age of 16, he joined a late line-up of The Misunderstood, at the same time as drummer Guy Evans, who had joined from Van der Graaf Generator, then on a brief hiatus. When Van der Graaf decided to reform after the release The Aerosol Grey Machine, and earlier bassist Keith Ellis deciding to join Juicy Lucy instead, Evans recommended that Potter join as a replacement.

Potter first appeared on the album The Least We Can Do Is Wave to Each Other, also playing some electric guitar on a few tracks in addition to his usual bass. Halfway during the recording of the following album H to He, Who Am the Only One (1970), he left the group after recording three tracks ("Killer", "The Emperor in his War Room" and "Lost"). The remainder of the album's bass tracks were completed by organist Hugh Banton, who took over the bass lines on bass pedals in concert.

Potter remained in touch with the band, and in 1971, he played bass guitar on Peter Hammill's first solo album, Fool's Mate, on Colin Scot's album Colin Scot and with the band Magna Carta. At an early 1971 Van der Graaf Generator concert at the Lyceum Ballroom, Banton's bass pedals failed during the opening number; since Potter happened to be in the audience, the band persuaded him to come on stage and play bass for the entire set. In the 1970s he also played with Jeff Beck, Chuck Berry, Rare Bird, and Steve Swindells. In 1973 he collaborated on The Long Hello project. His playing can also be heard on Peter Hammill's album Over (1977).

In 1977, after Hugh Banton and David Jackson had left Van der Graaf Generator, Potter was asked to re-join. He plays on both The Quiet Zone/The Pleasure Dome (1977) and the double live album Vital (1978). However, he was still uncomfortable with the dynamic of the band as he had been previously, stating "sometimes it felt like a cloud coming down – a very ominous feeling." He was particularly concerned at a gig in Annecy, France where he claimed someone was trying to perform an exorcism of the band's music while onstage, and had to be helped back to the dressing room, feeling very shaken.

Throughout the 1980s and early 1990s Potter continued to record and tour with Hammill, including playing bass for the K-Group (from 1981 to 1985), and with the Tigers (in 1980), and Duncan Browne (in 1984). In 1983 he started a solo career, and released a number of albums with mostly electronic music. In 1995 Potter produced and played bass on the posthumous album Songs of Love and War by Duncan Browne. In 2008 Potter published the live album Live in Italy.

All Potter's solo albums were published and remastered in 2009.

During the last two years of his life, Potter suffered from Pick's disease. In January 2013, Potter was admitted to University College Hospital suffering from pneumonia. He died there in the later hours of 16 January.

== Discography ==
=== Solo albums ===
- Mountain Music (1983, LP, reissued on CD in 1993)
- Sketches in Sound (1986, LP, reissued on CD in 1993)
- Self Contained (1987, CD/LP)
- Dreams in View 81–87 (1988, compilation CD, reissued in 1997)
- The Blue Zone (1990, CD/LP)
- The Blue Zone Party (1991, limited edition cassette tape) live on 29 May 1991 in London, The Dome
- New Europe-Rainbow Colours (1992, CD)
- Dreamworld (1997, CD)
- Live in Italy (2008, CD) with a.o. David Jackson, Tolo Marton and Tony Pagliuca
- All Contained (2009, CD) box set of remastered CD's of the Zom-Art catalogue

=== as member of The Misunderstood ===
- Golden Glass (The Misunderstood) (1969)

=== as member of Van der Graaf Generator ===
- The Least We Can Do Is Wave to Each Other (1970)
- H to He, Who Am the Only One (1970) (on tracks "Killer", "The Emperor in His War Room", and "Lost")
- The Quiet Zone/The Pleasure Dome (1977)
- Vital (1978)

=== as member of Rare Bird ===
- Epic Forest (1972)
- Somebody's Watching (1973)

=== as member of the Tigers ===
- Savage Music (1980)

=== with Peter Hammill ===
- Fool's Mate (1971)
- Chameleon in the Shadow of the Night (1973)
- Over (1977)
- Enter K (1982)
- Patience (1983)
- The Love Songs (1984)
- The Margin (1985, live)
- Out of Water (1990)
- Room Temperature (1990, live)
- Fireships (1992)
- The Noise (1993)
- Offensichtlich Goldfisch (1993)
- There Goes The Daylight (1993, live)
- Roaring Forties (1994)

=== Other collaborations ===
- Songs from Wasties Orchard (Magna Carta) (1971)
- The London Chuck Berry Sessions (Chuck Berry) (1972)
- Colin Scot (Colin Scot) (1971) – uncredited
- The Long Hello (1974)
- Fresh Blood (Steve Swindells) (1980)
- The Long Hello Volume Two (1981 Potter/Evans)
- Travelling Man (Duncan Browne) (1984)
- Final Adjustments (The Pool Sharks) (1987, released on CD in 2010)
- Songs of Love and War (Duncan Browne) (1995)
- Mistaken Identities (Steve Hyams) (1997)
- Bloodlines (Spirits Burning & Bridget Wishart) (2009)
