= None of the Above (album) =

Studio album by Peter Hammill
- Released: April 2000
- Recorded: Jan 1999 – Feb 2000
- Genre: Art rock
- Length: 44:32
- Label: Fie!
- Producer: Peter Hammill

Peter Hammill chronology
Typical (1999)	None of the Above (2000)	What, Now? (2001)

None of the Above is the 26th studio album by Peter Hammill, released on his Fie! label in 2000.

== Production and instrumentation ==
Hammill recorded None of the Above in his home studio, Terra Incognita, between January 1999 and February 2000, playing, producing and arranging nearly all instruments and singing nearly all voices. Some contributions were made by Stuart Gordon (violin, viola) on three tracks and Manny Elias (drums, percussion) on one track. Peter Hammill's daughters Holly and Beatrice Hammill sing backing soprano voices on two tracks. The instrumentation is dominated by guitars (more as a "colour-wash", as Hammill wrote in his newsletter), keyboards and some strings.

The long recording time is due to Hammill's parallel work on a remastered 4-CD compilation of Van der Graaf Generator called The Box.

== Title ==
The title of the album is the English phrase "None of the above", meaning none of the other choices are appropriate. The expression can be seen here as a metaphor for "people in earthy and/or earthly circumstances", i.e. as the opposite to heavenly conditions.

== Mood and style ==
The mood of the album is calm and melancholic. A typical song is "Naming the Rose", a chamber music-like arrangement for lead vocals, keyboards (in Hammond organ sound), violas and background choirs. It is about a gardener who names his last creation – a damask rose – after his wife who died on the very day the best blossom opened. The rose breeder fertilizes the seeds of the variety with the ashes of his wife. Thus the couple that had no children both live on in the new rose.

The first seven tracks all have the same topic as "Naming the Rose": people coming to an end of a phase in their life, in very different circumstances. But the eighth song ("Astart") says: every end can be a new start. In his newsletter from April 2000, Hammill comments:

This song doesn't hold out the possibility of changing one's past or even one's present; but it does propose that one should embrace both and go forward in expectation....

== Cover ==
The cover shows a serious-looking Hammill photographed by Dinu and the back cover – again alluding to the title of the album – a section of the star-spangled sky.

The booklet was designed by Paul Ridout. Each double page shows a washed-out photo presenting a staircase or a ladder ending nowhere or against a bricked entrance or upon an empty floor with black garbage bags lying around. Only the last double page for the song "Astart" shows busy people on an elevator rolling into some kind of shop scene.

== Reception ==
Professional ratings
Review scores
Source	Rating
Allmusic	3/5 stars

The music press did not take much notice of None of the Above. In allmusic.com Simon Cantlon gave 3 out of 5 stars for "poignant musical snapshots" and "atmosphere" but found "points on this release when things become a bit too monotonous". With 3 out of 5 stars the same rating is given on the fan site Progarchives.

== Track listing ==
All songs written by Peter Hammill.

No.	Title	Length
1.	"Touch And Go"	4:05
2.	"Naming The Rose"	5:16
3.	"How Far I Fell"	5:55
4.	"Somebody Bad Enough"	4:03
5.	"Tango For One"	6:43
6.	"Like Veronica"	5:54
7.	"In A Bottle"	8:01
8.	"Astart"	4:17

== Personnel ==
All tracks are played and sung by Peter Hammill with the following contributions:

- Stuart Gordon – violin, viola (2, 5, 8)
- Manny Elias – drums, percussion (6)
- Holly Hammill – vocals (2, 8)
- Beatrice Hammill – vocals (2, 8)

=== Technical ===
- Peter Hammill – recording engineer, mixing (Terra Incognita, Bath)
- Paul Ridout – design
