= The Future Now =

Studio album by Peter Hammill
- Released: 8 September 1978
- Recorded: 18 March – 26 April 1978
- Studios: Sofa Sound, Byfleet, Surrey
- Genre: Art rock
- Length: 41:21
- Label: Charisma
- Producer: Peter Hammill

Peter Hammill chronology
Over (1977)	The Future Now (1978)	pH7 (1979)

Professional ratings
Review scores
Source	Rating
Allmusic	4.5/5 stars

The Future Now is the seventh studio album by Peter Hammill, released on Charisma Records in 1978. It was the first solo album Hammill released following the 1978 breakup of his band Van der Graaf Generator, although he had released numerous solo albums while Van der Graaf Generator were active. The album contains twelve short songs, several in the new wave style of Van der Graaf Generator's last studio album, The Quiet Zone/The Pleasure Dome.

The song "Pushing Thirty" mentions "Nicky" Lowe and David Hemmings, as well as Hammill's alter ego Rikki Nadir (previously featured in Nadir's Big Chance).

The album cover shows a set of photographs by Brian Griffin, portraying Peter Hammill with half of his moustache and beard shaven.

"If I Could" was re-worked for Hammill's 1984 album The Love Songs.

== Track listing ==
All tracks are written by Peter Hammill.

Side one
No.	Title	Length
1.	"Pushing Thirty"	4:21
2.	"The Second Hand"	3:29
3.	"Trappings"	3:34
4.	"The Mousetrap (Caught In)"	4:07
5.	"Energy Vampires"	2:57
6.	"If I Could"	4:43
Total length:		23:08

Side two
No.	Title	Length
7.	"The Future Now"	4:14
8.	"Still in the Dark"	3:41
9.	"Mediaevil"	3:07
10.	"A Motor-Bike in Afrika"	3:11
11.	"The Cut"	4:21
12.	"Palinurus (Castaway)"	4:10
Total length:		22:42

2006 CD reissue bonus tracks
No.	Title	Length
13.	"If I Could" (Live)	4:41
14.	"The Mousetrap (Caught In)" (Live)	4:50

- Track 9 is incorrectly labelled as "Mediaeval" on the back of the CD version of album
- Tracks 13 and 14 recorded live at The All Souls Unitarian Church, Kansas City, Missouri, USA on 16 February 1978

== Personnel ==
- Peter Hammill – guitars, vocals, keyboards, harmonica, electronics
- David Jackson – saxophone (1, 2, 12)
- Graham Smith (of String Driven Thing) – violin (5, 6, 12)

=== Technical ===
- Peter Hammill – recording engineer (Sofa Sound, in Byfleet, Surrey)
- Pat Moran – mixing (Rockfield Studios, in Monmouth)
- Brian Griffin – photography
