= Nadir's Big Chance =

Studio album by Peter Hammill
- Released: February 1975
- Recorded: 1–7 December 1974
- Studios: Rockfield Studios, Monmouthshire; Trident Studios, London
- Genres: Progressive rock, garage rock, proto-punk, art rock
- Length: 48:24
- Label: Charisma
- Producer: Peter Hammill

Peter Hammill chronology
In Camera (1974)	Nadir's Big Chance (1975)	Over (1977)

Professional ratings
Review scores
Source	Rating
Allmusic	3/5 stars
Sounds	(favourable)
Tentative Reviews	4/5 stars

Nadir's Big Chance is the fifth solo album by Peter Hammill, released on Charisma Records in 1975.

It was recorded shortly after a decision to re-form the band Van der Graaf Generator (of which Hammill was the singer and principal songwriter) and Nadir's Big Chance is actually performed by the reformed Van der Graaf Generator line-up.

The title track tells a story about the fictitious character of Rikki Nadir, who is an attitude-filled rocker and can be considered an alter-ego of Hammill.

The album's songs vary greatly in style, as acknowledged by Hammill in the sleeve notes, which refer to "the beefy punk songs, the weepy ballads, the soul struts".

In a 1977 Capital Radio broadcast, John Lydon of the Sex Pistols played two tracks from the album, "The Institute of Mental Health, Burning" and "Nobody's Business", and expressed his admiration for Hammill.

The album includes two of Hammill's most frequently performed ballads at concerts and radio interviews, "Been Alone So Long" (written by Judge Smith) and "Shingle Song", and a reworking of Van der Graaf Generator's first single from 1968, "People You Were Going To".

The album presented Hammill's first use of the Hohner clavinet D6 keyboard, which featured prominently on the next few Van der Graaf Generator albums (particularly Godbluff).

In the song "Pushing Thirty" (from The Future Now, 1978), Hammill claims that he "still can be Nadir". The Rikki Nadir persona returned in October 1979, when Hammill released a single titled "The Polaroid" under the name, with "The Old School Tie" from pH7 as the B-side. It was included on some American pressings of pH7.

"Been Alone So Long" was re-worked for Hammill's 1984 album The Love Songs.

== Track listing ==
All tracks are written by Peter Hammill, except where noted.

Side one
No.	Title	Writer	Length
1.	"Nadir's Big Chance"		3:27
2.	"The Institute of Mental Health, Burning"	Hammill, Chris Judge Smith	3:50
3.	"Open Your Eyes"		5:10
4.	"Nobody's Business"		4:15
5.	"Been Alone So Long"	Chris Judge Smith	4:20
6.	"Pompeii"		4:50
Total length:			26:02

Side two
No.	Title	Length
7.	"Shingle Song"	4:16
8.	"Airport"	3:05
9.	"People You Were Going To"	5:06
10.	"Birthday Special"	3:36
11.	"Two Or Three Spectres"	6:21
Total length:		22:22

== Personnel ==
- Peter Hammill – voice, acoustic and electric guitars, Hohner clavinet, piano (7, 9), bass (11)
- David Jackson – saxophone (all tracks)
- Hugh Banton – bass guitar (1–10), piano (2, 6, 11), Hammond organ (3, 9)
- Guy Evans – drums, percussion (all tracks)

=== Technical ===
- Pat Moran – recording engineer (Rockfield Studios, Monmouth)
- Mike Stone – mixing (Trident Studios, London)
- Dinu M'Brela (alias of Peter Hammill) – cover design
