= Spur of the Moment (album) =

Studio album by Peter Hammill and Guy Evans
- Released: 27 June 1988
- Genre: Art rock, experimental music
- Length: 56:19
- Label: Red Hot
- Producer: Peter Hammill

Peter Hammill and Guy Evans chronology
| And Close As This (1986) | Spur of the Moment (1988) | In a Foreign Town (1988) |

Professional ratings
Review scores
| Source | Rating |
|---|---|
| Option Magazine | (not rated) |

Spur of the Moment is an album of experimental music by Peter Hammill and Guy Evans, originally released as cassette tape on the Red Hot label in 1988, and on CD by DaTE, a division of Line Music GmbH.

Hammill plays the grand piano, guitar and keyboards driving samplers and synthesizers, and Evans plays acoustic and electronic drumkits. The music is instrumental and entirely improvised. According to the booklet, instruments and fundamental note-patterns were decided upon prior to performing a piece, but no further structure was arranged in advance.

Both players regularly play each other's instruments. As the booklet states: "In much of this music the straight edges of the conventional instrument/instrumentalist picture become blurred; often the overall effect is of one instrument being played by four hands in some strange modern variant on the traditional piano duet."

A number of songs from Spur of the Moment were played live in a small number of concerts by Hammill and Evans in 1988 and again in 1996. A recording of one of these concerts from 1996 was released as The Union Chapel Concert.

A 20 second snippet of "Sweating it Out" was used as the theme music for a Boots the Opticians TV commercial.

== Album cover ==
The album cover shows parchment with lines of red and green paint, and in some places a "2" or "two" is discernable.

== Track listing ==
All songs written by Peter Hammill and Guy Evans, except where noted.

| No. | Title | Writer(s) | Length |
|---|---|---|---|
| 1. | "Sweating It Out" | | 6:34 |
| 2. | "Surprise/Little Did He Know" | | 9:31 |
| 3. | "Without A Glitch" | | 3:29 |
| 4. | "Anatol's Proposal" | | 4:01 |
| 5. | "You Think Not?" | | 4:33 |
| 6. | "Multiman" | Evans, Ridout, Hammill | 8:07 |
| 7. | "Deprogramming Archie" | | 1:46 |
| 8. | "Always So Polite" | | 5:24 |
| 9. | "An Imagined Brother" | | 5:21 |
| 10. | "Bounced" | Evans, Ridout, Hammill | 5:11 |
| 11. | "Roger And Out" | | 1:37 |

== Personnel ==
- Peter Hammill – grand piano, guitar and keyboards driving samplers and synthesizers
- Guy Evans – acoustic and electronic drum kits

=== Technical ===
- Peter Hammill – recording engineer, mixing (Sofa Sound, Bath)
- Paul Ridout – engineer, sequencing, artwork
