= Tony Stratton Smith =

British music executive (1933–1987)

- Born: 11 August 1933; Wolverhampton, England
- Died: 19 March 1987 (aged 53); St Helier, Jersey
- Other name: "Strat"
- Occupation: Music manager
- Known for: Charisma Records, The Koobas, The Nice, Van der Graaf Generator, Genesis, Bonzo Dog Doo-Dah Band, Monty Python

Tony Stratton Smith (born Anthony Mills Smith; 11 August 1933 – 19 March 1987) was an English rock music manager and entrepreneur. He founded the London-based record label Charisma Records in 1969 and managed rock groups such as the Nice, Van der Graaf Generator and Genesis.

== Early life ==
Smith was born in Wolverhampton, England. (Note: The website of The Marquee Club listed his birth place as Birmingham.)

== Career ==
Smith started his career as a sports journalist, mainly reporting on football for the Daily Sketch and the Daily Express. To avoid confusion with another journalist named Tony Stevens, while working for the Daily Sketch in 1954, he changed his name from Tony Smith to Tony Stratton Smith, which some mistakenly took for a hyphenated surname. In later years, he became known as "Strat", in particular to his associates in the music business.

While at the Daily Express, Smith was assigned to cover the Manchester United v Red Star Belgrade European Cup match in Yugoslavia in 1958, but their chief football correspondent Henry Rose pulled rank and decided to go instead. The aircraft bringing back the team, officials and press crashed in what became known as the Munich air disaster, and Rose was one of the fatalities.

Later on Smith began to be influenced by the Beatles, in particular their manager Brian Epstein, and decided to enter the music business. One of the earliest bands he managed were the Liverpool-based the Koobas, taking over from Epstein. He subsequently took over management of the Nice in 1968 from Andrew Loog Oldham and, frustrated with the workings of Oldham's Immediate Records label, decided to form his own.

Smith's later signings included the Bonzo Dog Band and Van der Graaf Generator. In 1969 he signed Genesis to his record and management companies, and released Trespass (1970), the band's second album. Genesis became pioneers of progressive rock and the label's most commercially successful group. Smith released many records by Monty Python and helped to finance the film Monty Python and the Holy Grail (1975). He also recorded former Bonzo frontman Vivian Stanshall and financed Stanshall's film Sir Henry at Rawlinson End (1980), as well as being credited as its producer. Other artists Smith was closely associated with include Atomic Rooster, Audience, Brand X, Phil Collins, Peter Gabriel, Steve Hackett, Peter Hammill, Lindisfarne, Julian Lennon, Robert John Godfrey, String Driven Thing, and Rare Bird. According to Hackett, Smith missed an opportunity to sign Queen, whose demos had been brought in to Charisma. Gail Colson worked with him at Charisma, as label manager and joint managing director. She left to form her own company in the late 1970s and would manage the solo careers of Gabriel and Hammill, among others.

In the United States, Charisma Records recordings were often licensed to other labels such as ABC Records (including subsidiary labels Dunhill Records & Probe Records), Elektra Records, Buddah Records, Atlantic Records, Mercury Records, and Arista Records. The label was eventually sold to Virgin Records in 1983. Virgin re-activated the Charisma name with a new logo for a short time during the late 1980s. The vast majority of the Charisma catalogue is now owned by EMI.

"Strat" as he was known to his friends was known for his sense of humour and flair for promotion. His sense of humour was often reflected in promotional materials and record label art. With an ear for unusual and creative talent he made Charisma successful, especially in its early years. Though usually known as "Charisma Records", the company also promoted itself as "the famous Charisma label", as printed on the original "scroll" record label logo.

== Personal life ==
Smith was gay.

== Death ==
Smith died of pancreatic cancer on 19 March 1987, aged 53. A memorial service was held for him at St Martin-in-the-Fields, London.

Marillion's album Clutching at Straws (released shortly after Smith's death in 1987) was dedicated to him in the sleeve credits. The song "Time to Burn" by Peter Hammill (1988) is "something of a goodbye to Tony Stratton Smith", and 3, the band of Keith Emerson, Carl Palmer and Robert Berry, dedicated the closing track, "On My Way Home", of their only album To the Power of Three (1988), to Smith. Steve Hackett dedicated the track "Concert For Munich" from his album Momentum (1988) to Smith.
