= Guy Evans =

British drummer

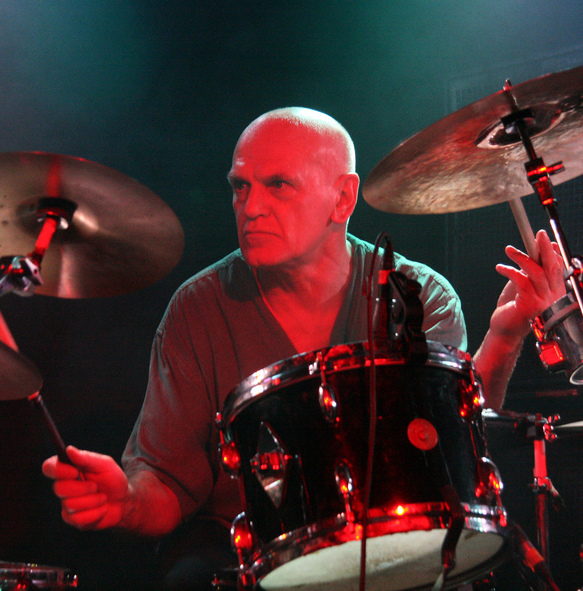
- Evans in 2011

Background information
- Born: Guy Randolph Evans; 17 June 1947 (age 79); Birmingham, England
- Genres: Progressive rock
- Occupation: Musician
- Instruments: Drums, percussion
- Years active: 1968–present
- Member of: Van der Graaf Generator; Echo City; Subterraneans

Guy Randolph Evans (born 17 June 1947) is an English drummer. He is best known as a member of the progressive rock band Van der Graaf Generator, appearing on each of their studio albums. He is also a member of Echo City and Subterraneans.

== Career ==
Whilst at the University of Warwick (1965–68), Evans played in the university band The New Economic Model. The band, which mainly played American soul music of the 1960s, played at university dances and supported bands such as Pink Floyd and The Move. There is a picture of Evans with the rest of the New Economic Model in "Van der Graaf Generator – The Book".

Evans has been a member of Van der Graaf Generator from 1968 until 1978, and since their reformation in 2005.

In addition to his work in Van der Graaf Generator, Evans has collaborated with other musicians, frequently with other (ex-) members of Van der Graaf Generator, as on The Long Hello project and in the K Group. He also works with Echo_City, building outdoor constructions which can be used to make music, called "sonic playgrounds". Evans also worked for a number of years at Shape Arts in an administrative role and as a workshop leader.

He has been the drummer in Subterraneans since 2002.

== Discography ==
=== Band member ===
With Van der Graaf Generator:

- The Aerosol Grey Machine (1969 album)
- The Least We Can Do Is Wave to Each Other (1970 album)
- H to He, Who Am the Only One (1970 album)
- Pawn Hearts (1971 album)
- Godbluff (1975 album)
- Still Life (1976 album)
- World Record (1976 album)
- The Quiet Zone/The Pleasure Dome (1977 album) – as Van der Graaf
- Vital (1978 live album) – as Van der Graaf
- Maida Vale (1994 live-in-studio album)
- An Introduction: From The Least To The Quiet Zone (2000)
- The Box (2000)
- Present (2005 album)
- Real Time (2007 live album)
- Trisector (2008 album)
- Live at the Paradiso (2009 live album)
- A Grounding in Numbers (2011 album)
- ALT (2012 album)
- Do Not Disturb (2016 album)

With The Misunderstood:

- Tuff Enough / Little Red Rooster (1969 single)
- Never Had A Girl (Like You Before) / Golden Glass (1969 single)

With Echo City:

- Gramophone (1987 album)
- The Sound of Music (1992 album)
- Sonic Sport 1983–88 Part One (1995 album)
- Loss of the Church 1997 (1997 album)
- Echo City (1999 CD single)
- Single2000 (2000 CD single)
- Union (2019 digital album release) as Echo City with Tchad Blake

With Subterraneans:

- Orly Flight (2003 compilation album)
- Themes for Maya Deren (2004 instrumental album)
- Soul Mass Transit (2006 album)
- Live in Berlin (2008 album)
- Eights and Rhymes (2008 instrumental album)
- This Too Shall Pass (2011 album)
- Goodbye Voyager (2017 album)

=== Solo ===
With Nic Potter:

- The Long Hello (1974 album)
- Dolphins / Welcombe Mouth (1980 single)
- The Long Hello Volume Two (1981 album)

With David Jackson and Life of Riley:

- The Long Hello Volume Four (1982 album)

With David Jackson and Hugh Banton:

- Gentlemen Prefer Blues (1985 album)

With Peter Hammill:

- Spur of the Moment (1988 album)
- The Union Chapel Concert (1997 live album)

With Big Buddha:

- Buddhology – Revelations from Under the Encounter (1993 cassette only album)
- The Dogford Chronicles (1993 cassette only album)

=== Collaborations ===
With Peter Hammill:

- Fool's Mate (1971 album)
- Chameleon in the Shadow of the Night (1973 album)
- The Silent Corner and the Empty Stage (1974 album)
- In Camera (1974 album)
- Nadir's Big Chance (1975 album)
- Over (1977 album)
- Sitting Targets (1981 album)
- Enter K (1982 album)
- Paradox Drive / Now More Than Ever (1982 single)
- Patience (1983 album)
- Film Noir / Seven Wonders (1983 single)
- The Margin (1985 album)
- Skin (1986 album)

With Charlie and The Wide Boys:

- Gilly I Do (1974 EP)
- Great Country Rockers (1976 album)

With Footsbarn Present's:

- The Circus Tosov (1980 album)

With Didier Malherbe and Yan Emerich:

- Melodic Destiny (cassette only album)

With Mother Gong:

- Robot Woman (1982 album)
- Rober Woman 2 (1982 album)
- Words Fail Me (1982 cassette only)
- Live at Glastonbury 1981 (1982 cassette only)
- Glastonbury '79–'81 (2005 album)

With Amon Düül UK:

- Meetings With Menmachines Inglorious Heroes of the Past... (1983 album)
- Die Lösung (1989 album)
- Fool Moon (1989 album)

With Nigel Mazlyn Jones:

- Breaking Cover (1982 album)
- Water From The Well (1987 cassette only album)
- Angels Over Water (1993 album)
- Behind the Stone (2002 album)

With Peter Blegvad:

- Knights Like This (1985 album)
- U Ugly I (1985 single)
- Special Delivery (1985 single)

With Frank Tovey:

- Snakes And Ladders (1986 album)

With Kazue Sawai:

- Eye To Eye (1987 album)

With Anthony Phillips and Harry Williamson:

- Tarka (1988 album)
