= PH7 (Peter Hammill album) =

pH7

Studio album by Peter Hammill
- Released: September 1979
- Recorded: Spring 1979
- Studio: Sofa Sound, Wiltshire
- Genre: Art rock, progressive rock
- Length: 43:40
- Label: Charisma
- Producer: Peter Hammill

Peter Hammill chronology
The Future Now (1978)	pH7 (1979)	A Black Box (1980)

pH7 is an album by the English musician Peter Hammill. It was released on Charisma Records in September 1979. It was Hammill's eighth solo album and his last release on the Charisma label.

The song "Porton Down" refers to the Porton Down military research facility in Wiltshire, England, while the lyrics of "Imperial Walls" are a translation of the first few lines of the Anglo-Saxon poem "The Ruin".

The song "Not For Keith" is a tribute to Keith Ellis, a former member of the band Van der Graaf Generator, who had then died just recently.

"Cover note: The photographs were all taken late at night in NYC. As we left Dan's [the photographer's] place in search of a cab Graham [Smith] and I ran into some trouble from which, frankly, we were lucky to escape...".

"My Favourite" was re-worked for Hammill's 1984 album The Love Songs.

"Faculty X" is a reference to extrasensory perception in the books of Colin Wilson.

In 2006, the album was remastered and expanded, adding alternative versions of "Mr X (Gets Tense)" and "Faculty X" recorded for John Peel's BBC Radio 1 programme, as well as a new sleeve note by Hammill.

== Critical reception ==
Professional ratings
Review scores
Source	Rating
AllMusic	3/5 stars
Sounds	5/5 stars

The Quad-City Times wrote that Hammill's "quirky rhythms, spare arrangements and eerie synthesizer lines are chilling rather than pretentious."

== Track listing ==
All tracks composed by Peter Hammill; except where noted.

Side one
No.	Title	Length
1.	"My Favourite"	2:53
2.	"Careering"	4:09
3.	"Porton Down"	3:45
4.	"Mirror Images"	3:54
5.	"Handicap and Equality"	4:04
6.	"Not for Keith"	2:31
Total length:		21:14

Side two
No.	Title	Writer(s)	Length
1.	"The Old School Tie"		5:02
2.	"Time for a Change"	Chris Judge Smith, Steve Robshaw	3:11
3.	"Imperial Walls"		4:15
4.	"Mr X (Gets Tense)"		6:05
5.	"Faculty X"		4:50
Total length:			23:13

2006 CD reissue bonus tracks
No.	Title	Length
1.	"Mr X (Gets Tense)"	6:05
2.	"Faculty X"	4:50

US/Canada vinyl pressings have an additional track at the end of side one, "The Polaroid".

Side one
No.	Title	Length
1.	"My Favourite"	2:53
2.	"Careering"	4:09
3.	"Porton Down"	3:45
4.	"Mirror Images"	3:54
5.	"Handicap and Equality"	4:04
6.	"Not for Keith"	2:31
7.	"The Polaroid"	2:33
Total length:		23:47

Side two
No.	Title	Writer(s)	Length
1.	"The Old School Tie"		5:10
2.	"Time for a Change"	Chris Judge Smith, Steve Robshaw	3:18
3.	"Imperial Walls"		4:18
4.	"Mr X (Gets Tense)"		6:06
5.	"Faculty X"		4:25
Total length:			23:13

== Personnel ==
- Peter Hammill – voice, guitar, keyboards, bass, drums, drum machine
- Graham Smith – violin (1, 3, 10, 11)
- David Jackson – saxophone, flute (2, 3, 11)

Technical

- Peter Hammill – recording engineer (Sofa Sound, Wiltshire)
- Pat Moran – mixing (Rockfield Studios, Monmouth)
- Rocking Russian – artwork
- Daniel C. Kirk – photography
