= Judge Smith =

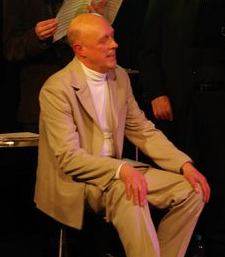
- Judge Smith performing The Climber in USF Verftet, Bergen, Norway, 9 May 2009

Background information
- Born: Christopher John Judge Smith; 1 July 1948 (age 78); England
- Genres: Progressive rock; musical; opera
- Occupations: Singer; musician; songwriter
- Instruments: Vocals; drums; percussion; saxophone; ocarina
- Years active: 1967–present
- Label: Masters of Art
- Formerly of: Van der Graaf Generator
- Website: judge-smith.com

Christopher John Judge Smith (born 1 July 1948) is an English songwriter, author, composer and performer, and a founder member of progressive rock band Van der Graaf Generator. Initially working under the name Chris Judge Smith, he has been known simply as Judge Smith since 1994. Since leaving Van der Graaf Generator in 1968, he has composed songs, stage musicals and operas, in addition to releasing solo albums, including three collections of "Songstories".

== Biography ==
=== Early years ===
In 1967, with Peter Hammill, Smith founded the band Van der Graaf Generator. He was originally a singing drummer and percussionist (sometimes playing a typewriter), but after drummer Guy Evans joined the band, Smith found there was not much of a role for him, since he was reduced to being a backing vocalist. After participating in recording the first Van der Graaf Generator single ("People You Were Going To" b/w "Firebrand"), Smith amicably left the band in 1968.

He went on to form a jazz-rock band called Heebalob, which included saxophonist David Jackson, who would later join Van der Graaf Generator. After the demise of Heebalob, Smith pursued a solo career, and wrote and recorded many songs, some of which appeared on his (currently unavailable) first solo album Democrazy (1991). Smith also wrote several stage musicals as lyricist with composer Maxwell Hutchinson. These included The Kibbo Kift (produced at the Traverse Theatre for the Edinburgh Festival of 1976 and at the Crucible Theatre in Sheffield the following year) and The Ascent of Wilberforce III (subtitled "The White Hell of Iffish Odorabad", and produced at the Traverse Theatre, in 1981, and at the Lyric Theatre, Hammersmith, London in 1982). His own chamber opera, The Book of Hours, was directed by Mel Smith at the Young Vic Theatre, London in 1978. Mata Hari (staged at the Lyric Theatre in 1982), was his last musical, co-written with Lene Lovich and Les Chappell, and starring Lovich.

Around 1973, Smith, together with Van der Graaf Generator co-founder Peter Hammill, began work on an opera based on the short story The Fall of the House of Usher by Edgar Allan Poe, Smith writing the libretto and Hammill composing the music. The album was finally released in 1991 on Some Bizzare Records, with a cast of singers including Lene Lovich, Andy Bell, Sarah Jane Morris and Herbert Grönemeyer. A reworked version, titled The Fall of the House of Usher – deconstructed & rebuilt, was released on Hammill's Fie! label in 1999. The new version is notable for having a cleaner, better produced sound, additional guitars and (unlike the first version) no percussion.

Peter Hammill has recorded a number of songs written by Smith, including "Been Alone So Long" and the jointly-written "The Institute of Mental Health, Burning" (both on Nadir's Big Chance, 1975), "Time for a Change" (on pH7, 1979), "Imperial Zeppelin" and "Viking" (on Fool's Mate, 1971), and "Four Pails" (on Skin, 1986), and plays them live on a regular basis. Lene Lovich also recorded songs written by Smith, including "What Will I Do Without You" and "You Can't Kill Me" (both on Flex, 1979).

In 1974 Smith wrote and directed a short film titled The Brass Band, which has won several international awards.

Smith also wrote music for the television comedy series Not The Nine O'Clock News in the 1980s, including the punk rock parody "Gob on You".

=== Recent years ===
In 1993, Dome of Discovery was released, Smith's first CD proper. Apart from the vocals, virtually every note on the album came from the sampled sounds of real instruments. Smith spent months making his own samples, hiring various musicians and recording individual notes. Since 2006, a remastered version has been available for download at iTunes.

After many years of work developing a new form of narrative music he calls "Songstory", Smith completed and released, in 2000, the double CD Curly's Airships, about the 1924 Imperial Airship Scheme and the R101 airship disaster of 1930. Among many others, Peter Hammill, Hugh Banton, Arthur Brown, David Jackson, John Ellis and Pete Brown performed on the project. Smith believes that the 2 hr 20 min work might be the largest and most ambitious single piece of rock music ever recorded. Curly's Airships was to be the first of three Songstories so far written and composed by Smith.

On the same day that Van der Graaf Generator played their reunion concert in the Royal Festival Hall in London, 6 May 2005, Smith played an afternoon concert at the Cobden Club in London. At this concert his new album, The Full English was launched, and Smith played (among others) all the songs from the album. He was accompanied by John Ellis on electric guitar, Michael Ward-Bergeman on accordion and René van Commenée on percussion.

A DVD recording of a concert by Smith in Guastalla, Italy, Live in Italy 2005, was released on DVD on 20 March 2006.

2006 also saw the release of The Vesica Massage, an album of instrumental music designed for use by massage therapists.

In October 2007, Smith released a two-song single CD, "The Light of the World" / "I Don't Know What I'm Doing", under the name of The Tribal Elders. This band consisted of Judge Smith, David Jackson, John Ellis, Michael Ward-Bergeman and Rikki Patten.

In January 2008, the full-length album Long-Range Audio Device was released, under the name of L-RAD, a collaboration between Judge Smith and American artist Steve Defoe. Defoe is a founder of The Larry Mondello Band, who released numerous cassette tapes of their lo-fi music in the 1980s and 1990s.

In May 2009 Smith performed the premiere of his second songstory, The Climber (written in 2005). The work was performed with a Norwegian male-voice choir, the Fløyen Voices, and no other instruments apart from a double bass, at USF Verftet in Bergen, Norway. A studio recording was released on 17 May 2010.

Between 2007 and 2011, Smith and David Jackson performed their piece The House That Cried six times live in Italy, with a choir and orchestra.

Smith released his third songstory, Orfeas, on 9 May 2011. It is a retelling of the ancient myth of Orpheus, performed by seven separate ensembles, each playing an entirely different kind of music. It features performances by, amongst others, John Ellis (as George Orfeas), Lene Lovich (as Eurydice) and David Jackson (as the saxophone player in the George Orfeas Band).

Smith's album Zoot Suit was released 17 March 2013, a collection of songs, produced by David Minnick. The album includes a duet with Lene Lovich, a studio recording of "Been Alone So Long", an extract from The Book of Hours, and a goodbye of sorts to recording, "I'm Through".

In 2013, Smith published his first book, "The Universe Next Door", about life after death. It is subtitled "Book One of the Judex Trilogy". Book Two, "The Vibrating Spirit", was published in 2014.

2016 saw the release of the CD Requiem Mass, Smith's setting of the Latin Mass for the Dead, with lyrics in Latin. The Requiem Mass was originally written in 1975. It features performances by The Crouch End Festival Chorus, conducted by David Temple, a four-piece rock band, and baritone lead singer Nigel Richards. Requiem Mass was performed for the first time on 12 July 2025 at Holy Sepulchre Church, Holborn Viaduct, London, in a concert conducted by David Temple, with Hertfordshire Chorus, a four-piece rock band, the brass section from London Orchestra da Camera, the organist Rufus Frowde and the soloist Alastair Brookshaw. The concert also featured Paul Patterson's "Magnificat".

== Discography ==
- Democrazy (a collection of recordings from 1968–1977, 1991)
- Dome of Discovery (1993, remastered version available on iTunes only, 2006)
- Curly's Airships (songstory, double CD, 2000)
- The Full English (2005)
- Live in Italy 2005 (DVD, 2006)
- The Vesica Massage (2006)
- The Light of the World (2007, two-song CD single, as The Tribal Elders)
- Long-Range Audio Device (2008, as L-RAD)
- The Climber (songstory, 2010)
- Orfeas (songstory, 2011)
- Zoot Suit (2013)
- Requiem Mass (2016)
- Towers Open Fire (2020, with Brakeman)
- The Solar Heresies and the Lunar Sequence (2020)
- Old Man in a Hurry (2021)
- The Trick of the Lock (2023, with Robert Pettigrew)
- The Overstayer (songstory, as download only, 2025)

== Bibliography ==
- The Universe Next Door – Book One of the Judex Trilogy (2013)
- The Vibrating Spirit – Book Two of the Judex Trilogy (2014)
- The Universe is Made of Voices – The replacement of the previous two books with additional material, restructuring the original planned trilogy into one book (2017)
- The Collected Lyrics of Judge Smith - Masters of Art (ISBN 978-1-3999-8893-3, 2024)
