= Peter Hammill =

English musician and recording artist (born 1948)

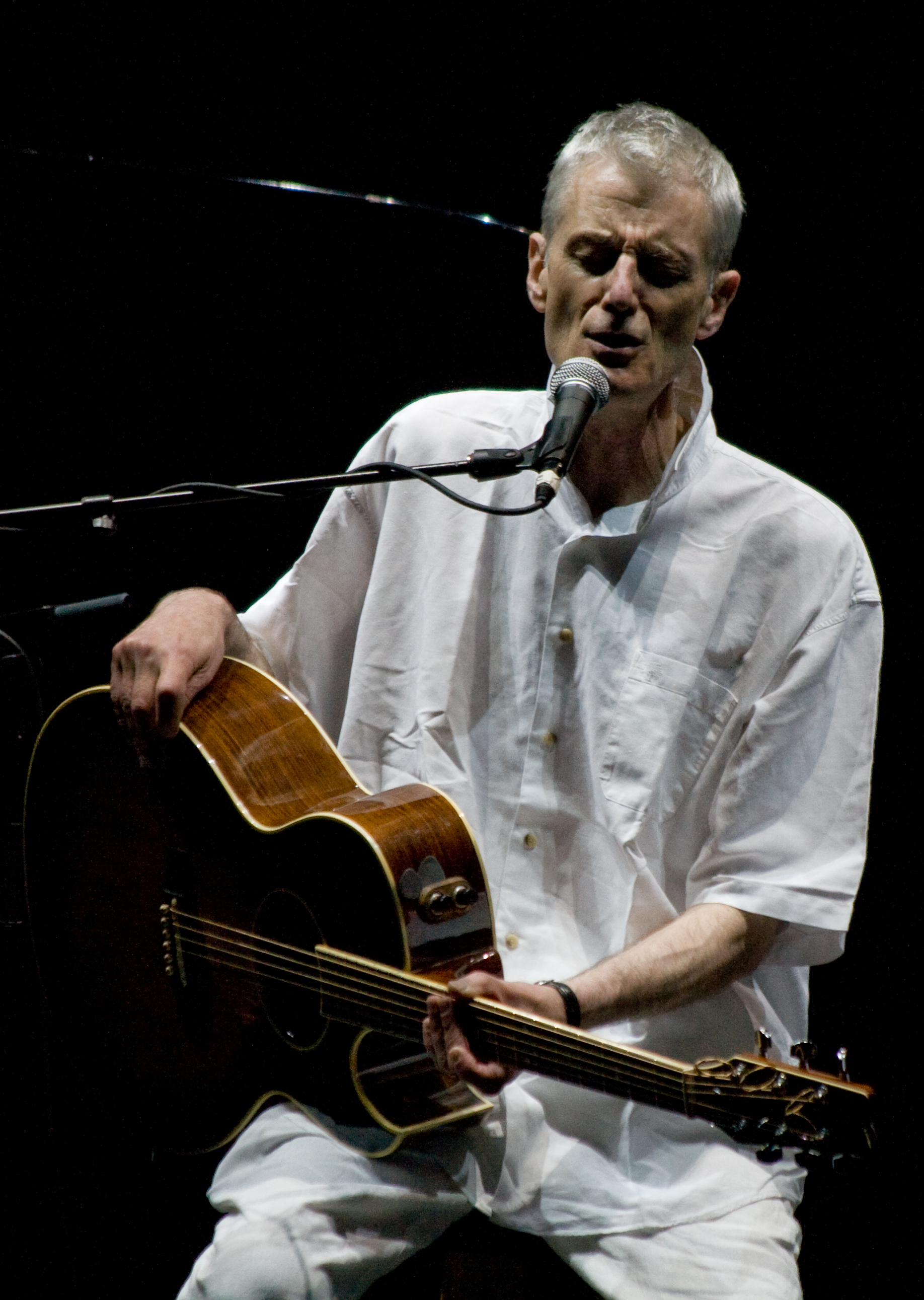
- Peter Hammill onstage at NEARfest, Bethlehem, Pennsylvania, June 2008

Background information
- Born: Peter Joseph Andrew Hammill; 5 November 1948 (age 78); Ealing, London, England
- Origin: Manchester, England
- Genre: Progressive rock
- Occupations: Singer; songwriter; record producer
- Instruments: Vocals; guitar; keyboards
- Works: Discography
- Years active: 1968–present
- Labels: Charisma; S-Type; Virgin; Naive; Foundry; Enigma; Fie!
- Member of: Van der Graaf Generator
- Spouse: Hilary
- Website: sofasound.com

Peter Joseph Andrew Hammill (born 5 November 1948) is an English musician and recording artist. He was a founder member of the progressive rock band Van der Graaf Generator. Best known as a singer-songwriter, he also plays guitar and piano and produces his own recordings and occasionally those of other artists. In 2012, he was recognised with the Visionary award at the first Progressive Music Awards. In 2026, Loudwire ranked him as the 11th greatest prog rock singer of all time.

== Biography ==
=== Early life ===
Peter Hammill was born in Ealing, West London, and moved with his family to Derby when he was 12. He attended Beaumont College and Manchester University, where he studied Liberal Studies in Science. Hammill has stated that his grandfather was originally from Pakistan.

=== Early career ===
Hammill's solo career has coexisted with Van der Graaf Generator's activities. The band was offered a contract by Mercury Records in 1968, that only Hammill signed. When Van der Graaf Generator broke up in 1969 he wanted to record his first solo album. In the summer of 1969 Hammill had a residency at The Lyceum and played weekly solo concerts there. Eventually the intended solo album was released under the Van der Graaf Generator banner as their first album, The Aerosol Grey Machine. Hammill's first real solo album was Fool's Mate (1971), containing songs from the early (1967/68) Van der Graaf Generator days.

=== Van der Graaf Generator and after ===
When Van der Graaf Generator broke up again in August 1972, Hammill resumed his solo career. Songs that were intended for Van der Graaf Generator now ended up on his solo albums, notably "Black Room" (on Chameleon in the Shadow of the Night) and "A Louse Is Not a Home" (on The Silent Corner and the Empty Stage). For the majority of both his solo songs and the band's songs he is credited as the sole songwriter, and some of his solo albums feature all the members of Van der Graaf Generator. In general, Hammill's solo work is thematically concerned with more personal matters, while the band's songs deal with broader themes.

Nadir's Big Chance (1975) was a major change from the preceding In Camera. Whilst In Camera is characterised by extremely intense and complex songs and even has some musique concrète on it, Nadir's Big Chance contains anticipations of punk rock. In a 1977 radio interview, John Lydon of the Sex Pistols played two tracks from the album and expressed his admiration for Hammill in glowing terms: "Peter Hammill's great. A true original. I've just liked him for years. If you listen to him, his solo albums, I'm damn sure Bowie copied a lot out of that geezer. The credit he deserves, just has not been given to him. I love all his stuff".

Over (1977) contains very personal songs about the break-up of a long-term relationship.

Hammill's first solo album after the 1978 break-up of Van der Graaf was The Future Now. He provided vocals on three tracks for Robert Fripp's solo debut Exposure, released in June 1979.

With the next solo albums, pH7 and A Black Box, the sound became more compact, more new wave. On those albums, Hammill played the drums himself. What followed was the K group. In later years Hammill would sometimes refer to the band as a "beat group". The K group consisted of Hammill himself on guitars and piano, with John Ellis on lead guitar, and Van der Graaf Generator mainstays Nic Potter on bass, and Guy Evans on drums and percussion. This group recorded the albums Enter K and Patience.

=== Live performances ===
Live concerts by Peter Hammill are characterised by a degree of unpredictability, in terms of the songs played, the arrangements and the players involved. Hammill generally does not undertake live tours to promote albums. Whenever he plays with a certain predominant line-up, almost always there will also be concerts interspersed with different permutations of musicians, so the word "tour" is not always very applicable.

From September 1981 until August 1984 Hammill played with the K group, playing raw, energetic, new-wave rock. A live recording taken from 4 concerts from Oktober 1983 was released as The Margin (1985). In March and April 1983, Hammill with John Ellis was the support act for Marillion on their UK tour in support of their debut album Script for a Jester's Tear. He toured again with Ellis in November 1988 and spring 1989.

From February until October 1990 he played with Nic Potter on bass and Stuart Gordon on violin. A live recording of these shows was released as Room Temperature. In 1992 a few shows were performed as quartet with the keyboard player David Lord added. From April to June 1993 Hammill, Gordon and Potter were joined by Manny Elias on drums and toured as "The Peter Hammill Band".. A live recording of these shows was released as There Goes The Daylight. From October 1994 until August 1996 Hammill played with David Jackson on flutes and saxophones, Stuart Gordon on violin and Manny Elias on drums (this line-up is sometimes informally referred to as the Peter Hammill Quartet).

From January 1998 until November 2006 Hammill played with just Stuart Gordon on violin. Of these shows the live recording Veracious was released.

From 1969 on, Hammill has also performed solo concerts, with just guitar and keyboards.

=== Fie! Records ===
Hammill's early records, like the Van der Graaf Generator albums, were released on Charisma Records. He parted company with them after pH7 (1979), and then released albums on a number of small labels. A Black Box came out on S-Type, a label run by Hammill and his manager Gail Colson. Enter K and Patience appeared on Naive, Skin and The Margin on Foundry and In A Foreign Town, Out of Water and Room Temperature on Enigma Records. In 1992 he formed his own label, Fie! Records, on which all his albums since Fireships have been released. The label's logo is the Greek letter phi (Φ), a pun on PH-I. Ever since the 1970s he has also had his own home recording studio, called Sofa Sound. His website was later named after the studio.

In November 2023, Hammill wrote that he had "passed over the curatorship of the Fie! catalogue to Cherry Red".

=== Later years ===
In 1991, Hammill released the long-awaited opera The Fall of the House of Usher. He had written the music and Van der Graaf Generator co-founder Judge Smith the libretto, and the two of them had been working on it since 1973. In 1999 he released a reworked version, The Fall of the House Of Usher (Deconstructed & Rebuilt).

He was awarded the Italian Tenco Prize for songwriting at the end of 2004.

In 2005, Hammill announced the reformation of Van der Graaf Generator. In 2004 they had recorded a new album, Present, which was released in April 2005, and from May until November 2005 played a series of well received concerts. Between 2005 and 2007 Hammill oversaw the remastering of almost all of his pre-Fie! releases, and also carried out similar work on his more recent catalogue. The last of the Charisma remasters was released in September 2007. Hammill's solo career did not end because of the Van der Graaf Generator reunion. He released an album Singularity in December 2006. It was the first solo album he completed after his heart attack, and for a large part it deals with matters of life and (sudden) death. In 2007 several gigs by Van der Graaf Generator as a trio (minus David Jackson) took place in Britain and Europe; their new album Trisector was released in March 2008. In the summer and autumn of 2008, Hammill did a tour of solo dates in the U.S. and Canada which included a performance at the progressive rock festival NEARfest. He also played his only ever professional "parlour gig" at a private residence in Holland, Michigan.

In the summer of 2009 Van der Graaf Generator toured the U.S. and Canada, which occasioned Hammill's triumphant return to NEARfest. Thin Air was released on 8 June 2009. This was followed in October 2011 by a live double CD Pno, Gtr, Vox, recorded at performances in Japan and the UK in 2010. An extended 7-CD box set, Pno, Gtr, Vox Box was released in a limited edition of 2000 in February 2012.

Consequences, a solo studio album was released in May 2012. Again Hammill played all the instruments. The lyrics deal with conflicted characters in various scenarios. Other World, a collaborative album with guitarist Gary Lucas, was released in February 2014. The album features Hammill's vocals, Hammill and Lucas on guitars, and Hammill's sound treatments, and is a mixture of conventional songs with extended avant-garde instrumentals.

In 2019 In Amazonia was released, a collaboration album with progressive rock group Isildurs Bane. Hammill released a second album with Isildurs Bane in September of 2021, In Disequilibrium. Earlier that year in May, In Translation was released, Hammill's first covers album. Written in light of Brexit, Hammill has called it "a love letter to Europe," and it features songs written by Fabrizio De André, Massimo Bubola, Astor Piazzolla, Leiber and Stoller, Gustav Mahler, Rodgers and Hammerstein, and Gabriel Fauré among others.

In July 2026, at the age of 77, Hamill participated in the BBC Proms at the Royal Albert Hall. Accompanied by the BBC Concert Orchestra, he sang "Refugees", from the 1970 album The Least We Can Do Is Wave to Each Other, as part of the Proms' Prog Rock: A Fanfare for the Common Man night.

== Music ==
Musically, Hammill's work ranges from short simple riff-based songs to highly complex lengthy pieces. His work with Van der Graaf Generator, and much of his solo work, is usually described as progressive rock, though Hammill himself does not identify with the label. He has received the first ever recognition as a "visionary artist" from the progressive music world.

Hammill's output is prolific. Many different styles of music appear in his work, among them artful complexity (for instance Chameleon in the Shadow of the Night), avant garde electronic experiments (Loops and Reels, Unsung), opera (The Fall of the House of Usher), solo keyboard accompaniment (And Close As This), solo guitar accompaniment (Clutch), improvisation (Spur of the Moment), film music (Sonix), band recordings (Enter K), and slow, melancholic balladry (None of the Above).

Hammill exerted significant influences on punk rock and new wave music. Over the years he collaborated with musicians and song-writers such as Le Orme, Robert Fripp, Peter Gabriel, Alice, Ayuo, Herbert Grönemeyer, Judge Smith, The Stranglers, David Cross, Moondog, Premiata Forneria Marconi, Tim Bowness, Jakko Jakszyk and The Amorphous Androgynous.

== Voice ==
Hammill's voice is a very distinctive element of his music. He sings in an emotional, often even dramatic way. As a former Jesuit chorister, his delivery is usually Received Pronunciation British English – notable exceptions are his Afrikaner accent on "A Motor-bike in Afrika" and his Cockney accent on "Polaroid" — and ranges in tone from peacefully celestial to screaming rants (which are nevertheless highly controlled). Singing in registers from bass-baritone to high falsetto, he growls, croons, shrieks and shouts in ways that have drawn comparison with the guitar playing of Jimi Hendrix.

== Lyrics ==
Hammill's lyrics are another distinctive feature of his work. He has visited a number of recurring themes including love and human relationships, ageing and death, human folly, self-awareness and introspection, politics, and religion. His lyrics often include scientific, literary or historical references. For example, the Norse names mentioned in the song "Viking" on Fool's Mate (co-written with Judge Smith) are characters in the Icelandic Saga of Eric the Red.

The science fiction themes of Van der Graaf Generator's lyrics are mostly absent in his later work, but there still are many science references, especially to physics (for instance in the song "Patient"). In 1974 Hammill published a book, Killers, Angels, Refugees (Charisma Books, London), a collection of lyrics, poems and short stories. This was later reissued by Hammill himself (Sofa Sound, Bath) and was followed by a sequel Mirrors, Dreams, Miracles (1982).

In 2000 Dagmar Klein published Shouting down the passage of time: The Spaces & Times of Peter Hammill, an analysis and interpretation of Hammill's lyrics along the lines of his dealings with "Space", "Time" and "Journeys".

== Personal life ==
Hammill has been married since 1978 to Hilary, who is credited with taking the picture for the cover of In a Foreign Town. They have three daughters. Two of them, Holly and Beatrice Hammill, sing soprano vocals on one track of Everyone You Hold and on two tracks of None of the Above. Holly wrote the song "Eyebrows" (on Unsung) and co-wrote "Personality" (on Everyone You Hold).

Hammill is fluent in Italian.

Hammill survived a heart attack in December 2003, less than 48 hours after having finished the recording of Incoherence. In May 2022, while on tour with Van der Graaf Generator, he had to undergo surgery in Germany. He stated on social media: "No long term repercussions from my surgery in Fürth (where my treatment was outstanding). It also has to be said that it was a close-run thing".

== Discography ==
- Fool's Mate (July 1971)
- Chameleon in the Shadow of the Night (May 1973)
- The Silent Corner and the Empty Stage (February 1974)
- In Camera (July 1974)
- Nadir's Big Chance (February 1975)
- Over (April 1977)
- The Future Now (September 1978)
- pH7 (September 1979)
- A Black Box (August 1980)
- Sitting Targets (June 1981)
- Enter K (October 1982)
- Loops and Reels (June 1983)
- Patience (August 1983)
- Skin (March 1986)
- And Close As This (November 1986)
- In a Foreign Town (November 1988)
- Out of Water (February 1990)
- The Fall of the House of Usher (November 1991, deconstructed and rebuilt released in Nov 1999)
- Fireships (March 1992)
- The Noise (March 1993)
- Roaring Forties (September 1994)
- X My Heart (March 1996)
- Sonix (November 1996)
- Everyone You Hold (June 1997)
- This (October 1998)
- None of the Above (April 2000)
- What, Now? (June 2001)
- Unsung (October 2001)
- Clutch (October 2002)
- Incoherence (March 2004)
- Singularity (December 2006)
- Thin Air (June 2009)
- Consequences (April 2012)
- ...All That Might Have Been... (November 2014)
- From the Trees (November 2017)
- In Translation (May 2021)
- Tears in Time (September 2026)

== See also ==
- Van der Graaf Generator discography

== Further references ==
- PH-VdGG Study Group, Fiaccavento L., Olivotto M. (2005) Van der Graaf Generator – Dark Figures Running – Lyrics 1968–1978 (Published by PH-VdGG Study Group )
- Mike Barnes, Life Sentences. Wire, March 2007. pp. 34–41.
- Joe Banks, Rock And Role: The Visionary Songs Of Peter Hammill And Van der Graaf Generator (Kingmaker Publishing, 2025, ISBN 978-1-8384918-9-5)
