= Present (Van der Graaf Generator album) =

Studio album by Van der Graaf Generator
- Released: 25 April 2005
- Recorded: 15–21 February 2004
- Studios: Pyworthy Rectory, North Devon
- Genres: Progressive rock, art rock
- Length: 102:05
- Label: Charisma

Van der Graaf Generator chronology
Maida Vale (1994)	Present (2005)	Real Time (2007)

Professional ratings
Review scores
Source	Rating
AllMusic	4/5 stars
BBC Music	(favorable)
Uncut	(4/5)

Present is the ninth studio album by British progressive rock band Van der Graaf Generator, released in 2005. It was the band's first studio album since The Quiet Zone/The Pleasure Dome in 1977, and the first with the 'classic' line-up since World Record in 1976. The Charisma Records label was re-activated for its release, as well as a re-issue series of Van der Graaf Generator's catalogue and Peter Hammill's solo releases from 1972 to 1986.

For many years the band's lead singer and principal songwriter Peter Hammill had rejected the idea of a VdGG re-union, but in 2004 (following two unannounced re-unions at Hammill concerts), work began on an official re-union album. Present was the result. It consists of one disc of compositions (five songs plus an instrumental, "Boleas Panic"), and one disc of studio improvisations. The band had always improvised in the studio throughout their history, but never before (except for the bootleg-quality Time Vaults), had any of these improvisations been officially released.

In 2005, the band embarked on a successful re-union tour. Only two songs from Present were played on the tour, "Every Bloody Emperor" and "Nutter Alert".

== Track listing ==
All tracks are written by Hugh Banton, Guy Evans, David Jackson and Peter Hammill except where noted.

Disc one
No.	Title	Writer(s)	Length
1.	"Every Bloody Emperor"	Peter Hammill	7:03
2.	"Boleas Panic"	David Jackson	6:50
3.	"Nutter Alert"	Hammill	6:11
4.	"Abandon Ship!"	Guy Evans, Hammill	5:07
5.	"In Babelsberg"	Hammill	5:30
6.	"On The Beach"	Jackson, Hammill	6:48

Disc two
No.	Title	Length
1.	"Vulcan Meld"	7:19
2.	"Double Bass"	6:33
3.	"Slo Moves"	6:24
4.	"Architectural Hair"	8:55
5.	"Spanner"	5:02
6.	"Crux"	5:50
7.	"Manuelle"	7:51
8.	"'Eavy Mate"	3:50
9.	"Homage To Teo"	4:45
10.	"The Price Of Admission"	8:49

== Personnel ==
Van der Graaf Generator

- Peter Hammill – vocals, guitar, keyboards
- David Jackson – saxophone, flute
- Hugh Banton – organ, bass
- Guy Evans – drums, percussion

== Reception ==
The album was named as one of Classic Rock‘s 10 essential progressive rock albums of the decade.

== Charts ==
Chart (2005)	Peak position
German Albums (Offizielle Top 100)	100
Italian Albums (FIMI)	36
