= List of Pocoyo episodes =

Episode list for an animated series

Pocoyo is an animated interactive preschool comedy television series created by David Cantolla, Luis Gallego, and Guillermo García Carsí, and is produced by the Spanish animation company Zinkia Entertainment and French-based company Animaj. It follows the adventures of Pocoyo, a four-year-old boy and his animal companions, Pato the duck, Elly the elephant and more. The series debuted on 7 January 2005 in Spain and 10 May 2005 in the United Kingdom.

As of 28 September 2026, 341 episodes of Pocoyo have aired, including sixty specials, currently in its sixth season. A seventh season is in development and lancament for 2027. Pocoyo & the Space Circus, a half-hour special film was screened in select cinemas on 23 November 2008. A made-for-TV special promoting the release of The Space Circus, titled El Show de Pocoyo ("Pocoyo's Show" in English) premiered on La 1 on 21 December 2008. A second TV special, Pocoyo's Big Party released on CD on 27 August 2009, with a Clan linear premiere on 31 December 2015. A second special film titled Pocoyo in Cinemas: Your First Movie, which included the short film Pocoyo and the League of Extraordinary Super Friends released in Mexican cinemas on 11 May 2018 and Spain cinemas on 23 June. The film grossed US$34,000 worldwide at the box office. A third film is in development.

== Series overview ==
| Season | Episodes | | Originally released | | |
| Season | Episodes | | First released | Last released | Network |
|---|---|---|---|---|---|
| Pilots | 2 | | 2002 | 2004 | —N/a |
| 1 | 52 | | 10 May 2005 | 18 November 2005 | CITV |
| 2 | 52 | | 7 August 2006 | 6 May 2007 | CITV |
| 3 | 52 | | 3 July 2010 | 27 November 2010 | La 1 |
| 4 | 53 | 26 | 28 November 2016 | 22 December 2017 | YouTube |
| 4 | 53 | 27 | 3 November 2020 | 8 July 2021 | ABC Kids (Note: "Dragon Island" did not air on ABC Kids and instead had a one-day cinematic release at Cine Capitol.) |
| Specials | 60 | 14 | 28 October 2016 | 13 December 2019 | YouTube |
| Specials | 60 | 9 | 20 March 2020 | 27 November 2020 | YouTube |
| Specials | 60 | 20 | 2 April 2021 | 23 September 2022 | YouTube |
| Specials | 60 | 12 | 7 October 2022 | 10 February 2025 | YouTube |
| Specials | 60 | 5 | 24 May 2024 | 2 February 2025 | YouTube |
| 5 | 52 | | 22 July 2024 | 27 October 2025 | HBO Max |
| 6 | 20 | | 26 June 2026 | 2027 | HBO Max, ITVX |

== Episodes ==
=== Pilots (2002–04) ===
| Title | Written by | Produced in |
|---|---|---|
| "Pilot" | TBD | 2002 (Note: It was not publicly available until July 15, 2006.) |
Pocoyo and Ducky (Note: In the pilot, Ducky was the prototype name for Pato.) ride on a boat, looking for some fish.
| "The See-Saw" | David Cantolla & Guillermo Garcia | 2004 (Note: This pilot can only be found in the extended DVD version of the special El Show de Pocoyo.) |
Pocoyo and Pato learn how a see-saw works, with the help of their friend Elly.

=== Series 1 (2005) ===
| No. overall | No. in series | Title | Written by | Original release date |
|---|---|---|---|---|
| 1 | 1 | "Umbrella Umbrella" | Andy Yerkes | 10 May 2005 |
Pocoyo and his friends try to find out how to use an umbrella.
| 2 | 2 | "Drum Roll Please" | Claudia Silver | 13 May 2005 |
Pocoyo and his friends try to make their own band after listening to the Ball Orchestra. However, they need a rhythm to make it sound just like the orchestra.
| 3 | 3 | "Swept Away" | P. Kevin Strader | 16 May 2005 |
Pocoyo has to clean up his building blocks before Elly comes over to play, but when he finds a broom, he uses it for anything but cleaning up.
| 4 | 4 | "Who's on the Phone?" | Pippin Parker | 19 May 2005 |
Pocoyo finds a telephone and tries to work out what it's for (and who's calling him).
| 5 | 5 | "Fetch Loula Fetch!" | P. Kevin Strader | 22 May 2005 |
Pocoyo and Loula are going to the beach but keep losing their orange bouncy ball. They must learn about shapes, colour, and size in order to retrieve it.
| 6 | 6 | "A Little Cloud" | Andy Yerkes | 25 May 2005 |
Pocoyo is followed by a lonely little cloud who wants to play with him, much to his annoyance.
| 7 | 7 | "A Present for Elly" | Susan Kim | 28 May 2005 |
It's Elly's birthday and Pocoyo makes a surprise present for her. While he does so, the Narrator tries to guess what the present is.
| 8 | 8 | "Pocoyo Dance" | Susan Kim | 31 May 2005 |
Pocoyo and Pato find a radio, but the former has some trouble dancing to the music it plays, which causes him to feel left out.
| 9 | 9 | "The Big Sneeze" | Claudia Silver | 3 June 2005 |
Elly has a cold and her sneezes keep knocking Pocoyo's block tower down, angering Pato.
| 10 | 10 | "A Mystery Most Puzzling" | Pippin Parker | 6 June 2005 |
Pocoyo has to follow the clues in a series of photographs to work out who stole his camera.
| 11 | 11 | "Hush" | Michele F. Cavin | 9 June 2005 |
Pocoyo finds a butterfly but every time he yells his greetings, it flies away, forcing him and his friends to give chase.
| 12 | 12 | "Double Bubble" | David Ingham | 12 June 2005 |
Pocoyo and Elly enjoy making bubbles for Loula, but the two argue over who gets to use the bubble blower.
| 13 | 13 | "The Key to it All" | Andy Yerkes | 15 June 2005 |
Pocoyo finds a key and invites Pato and Elly to join him on a hunt to find treasure.
| 14 | 14 | "Keep Going Pocoyo!" | David Ingham | 18 June 2005 |
Pato and Elly are jumping rope and Pocoyo wants to join in too but cannot get the knack going.
| 15 | 15 | "Sleepy Bird's Surprise" | P. Kevin Strader | 21 June 2005 |
Sleepy Bird's egg falls out of her nest, and Pocoyo and Pato try to get it back before it hatches.
| 16 | 16 | "Where's Pocoyo?" | Susan Kim | 24 June 2005 |
Pocoyo plays hide-and-seek with the Narrator, much to his annoyance.
| 17 | 17 | "Drummer Boy" | Claudia Silver | 27 June 2005 |
Pocoyo wants to drum but his friends don't want to join him because they're busy with other things.
| 18 | 18 | "The Great Race" | Annie Evans | 30 June 2005 |
Elly and Pocoyo have a car race to see who can drive faster.
| 19 | 19 | "Don't Touch" | Pippin Parker | 8 August 2005 |
Pocoyo is left in charge of protecting Elly's block castle, and she tells him not to touch it or it'll collapse. However, Pocoyo can't resist feeling the works of a masterpiece and purposely breaks the rule.
| 20 | 20 | "Mystery Footprints" | Susan Kim | 11 August 2005 |
Pocoyo and his friends learn about footprints, until they discover ones too bizarre for any feet.
| 21 | 21 | "Magical Watering Can" | Michele F. Cavin | 14 August 2005 |
On a hot day, Pocoyo gets the final remains of water for his Musical Flower, a flower that dances to music every time it's watered, but is forced to share them with his friends.
| 22 | 22 | "Table for Fun" | Pippin Parker | 17 August 2005 |
Pocoyo and Elly play restaurants, but their unwilling guest Pato expects real food instead of pretend.
| 23 | 23 | "Twinkle Twinkle" | Susan Kim | 20 August 2005 |
A star falls from the night sky and Elly wants to keep it, but Pocoyo wants to put it back in the sky as others need it to help fall sleep. This leads him to chase after her.
| 24 | 24 | "Hiccup" | Annie Evans | 23 August 2005 |
When Pato gets the hiccups, Pocoyo and Elly try to help him get rid of them.
| 25 | 25 | "Pato's Postal Service" | P. Kevin Strader | 26 August 2005 |
Pocoyo wants to send a letter to Elly, so Pato becomes a postman for the day. However, Pocoyo and Elly exchange too much letters and parcels constantly, tiring out Pato.
| 26 | 26 | "Puppy Love" | Claudia Silver | 29 August 2005 |
When Pocoyo neglects Loula after he finds a new toy robot dog to play with, she feels left out.
| 27 | 27 | "Bat and Ball" | Rebecca Chace | 2 September 2005 |
Pocoyo, Elly, and Pato play Bat and Ball with Octopus, but Elly hogs all the turns, angering Pocoyo.
| 28 | 28 | "Elly Spots" | Christopher Hoey | 5 September 2005 |
Elly is stricken with a case of the elephant spots and Pocoyo and Pato have to forsake their picnic to look after her.
| 29 | 29 | "Up Up and Away" | Jeff Kindley | 6 September 2005 |
Pocoyo and his friends go on an adventure to retrieve his toy plane after Elly accidentally throws it to outer space. Over there, the three meet a population of aliens who help them retrieve Pocoyo's plane.
| 30 | 30 | "A Surprise for Pocoyo" | Pippin Parker | 11 September 2005 |
Pocoyo's friends prepare a surprise party for him, and the Narrator tries to distract him so they can finish setting it up.
| 31 | 31 | "Having a Ball" | Claudia Silver | 14 September 2005 |
Baby Bird wants to play ball with Pocoyo and Pato but they think he's too little, so he steals their ball, forcing the two to give chase to get it back.
| 32 | 32 | "Super Pocoyo" | Jeff Kindley | 15 September 2005 |
Pocoyo pretends to be a superhero (with Pato as his sidekick), but doesn't understand that his friends don't need help.
| 33 | 33 | "Let's Go Camping!" | Pippin Parker | 19 September 2005 |
Pocoyo, Pato, and Elly prepare to go on a camping trip, but the boys bring too much stuff, and the Vamoosh isn't able to carry it all.
| 34 | 34 | "Pocoyo, Pocoyo" | James Ponti | 22 September 2005 |
When Pocoyo can't find his friends, he discovers his echo, but doesn't know what one is.
| 35 | 35 | "Elly's Big Chase" | Susan Kim | 25 September 2005 |
When Pocoyo and Pato tie their balloons to Elly's lounge, the balloons carry it into the air, with Elly asleep in it. The boys try to rescue her before she wakes up.
| 36 | 36 | "Pocoyo Gets it Right" | David Ingham | 28 September 2005 |
Pocoyo wants to learn how to play golf but he doesn't want Elly's help. However, without her help, he doesn't know how to hit the golf ball into the hole.
| 37 | 37 | "Juggling Balls" | Rebecca Chace | 1 October 2005 |
Pocoyo wants to juggle like Elly and Octopus, so the latter teaches him. However, after he concludes that Pocoyo is too young to juggle, Octopus teaches him how to form into a ball, so he can instead be juggled.
| 38 | 38 | "Fussy Duck" | Andy Yerkes | 4 October 2005 |
Pato wants to stay clean after taking four showers, but his cleanliness is no match for his friends' messy act.
| 39 | 39 | "A Dog's Life" | Pippin Parker | 7 October 2005 |
Pocoyo pretends to be a dog but doesn't know that Loula is in pain after she steps on something sharp.
| 40 | 40 | "Pocoyolympics" | Susan Kim | 10 October 2005 |
Pocoyo, Pato, and Elly compete in their own version of the Olympics but Pocoyo gets jealous when everyone wins a medal except him.
| 41 | 41 | "Picture This" | David Ingham | 13 October 2005 |
Pocoyo draws pictures of fish doing impossible things like flying or swinging vines, but his friends don't think that's true.
| 42 | 42 | "Whale's Birthday" | Claudia Silver | 16 October 2005 |
Pocoyo, Pato, and Elly make presents for Whale's birthday, but the presents get ruined while they venture underwater.
| 43 | 43 | "Pocoyo's Little Friend" | P. Kevin Strader | 19 October 2005 |
Pocoyo meets a little caterpillar with a large appetite, so he feeds it his friends' personal belongings.
| 44 | 44 | "Colour My World" | Rebecca Chace | 22 October 2005 |
Pocoyo finds a remote control that changes the colours of the things around him. However, his friends get cross with him after he changes their colour, so he decides to put things right.
| 45 | 45 | "Bedtime" | Claudia Silver | 25 October 2005 |
It's time for bed but Pocoyo isn't tired and wants to stay up to keep playing, but keeps Pato from his sleep.
| 46 | 46 | "A Little Something Between Friends" | Pippin Parker | 28 October 2005 |
Pocoyo and Pato have a fight, refuse to make up, and build a wall against each other. However, the two grow to miss each other later on.
| 47 | 47 | "Giggle Bug" | Susan Kim | 3 November 2005 |
Octopus enjoys making Pocoyo and Elly get out of their bad moods and laugh, but when Pato grows the angriest of them all, Octopus is put to the ultimate test.
| 48 | 48 | "What's in the Box?" | David Ingham | 6 November 2005 |
Pocoyo plays with a box but doesn't see Loula go inside it. So, his friends chase after the "living" box.
| 49 | 49 | "Musical Blocks" | P. Kevin Strader | 9 November 2005 |
When Pocoyo comes across equalizer-built blocks, he and Pato enjoy playing watching it rise and fall when they play various music, until Pato gets stuck on top of the blocks.
| 50 | 50 | "Paint Me a Picture!" | Rebecca Chace | 12 November 2005 |
Pocoyo wants to paint pictures of his friends, but they won't stay still for the painting.
| 51 | 51 | "Elly's Doll" | Jeff Kindley | 15 November 2005 |
Pocoyo is charged with looking after Elly's favourite doll, but he accidentally breaks it. Instead of telling her the truth, he pretends to be the doll to stop her from finding out.
| 52 | 52 | "Wackily Ever After" | James Ponti | 18 November 2005 |
Pocoyo and his friends act out a fairy tale, with their own silly additions.

=== Series 2 (2006–2007) ===
| No. overall | No. in series | Title | Written by | Original release date |
|---|---|---|---|---|
| 53 | 1 | "Mr. Big Duck" | Ken Scarborough | 7 August 2006 |
Feeling he's different from everyone else, Pato finds a pair of sunglasses and welcomes a new "cool" persona, Mr. Big Duck. Pocoyo and Baby Bird join in as sidekicks, but later quit. Elly shows Pato how there's no need to feel left out.
| 54 | 2 | "Guess What?" | Ken Scarborough | 10 August 2006 |
Pocoyo plays a game with the Narrator where he must guess who the person is, based on their body parts.
| 55 | 3 | "All for One" | Ken Scarborough | 13 August 2006 |
Pocoyo feels left out when he discovers that all of his friends can fly while he can’t. He tries to join them, but he soon becomes frustrated because he can’t keep up. His friends realize that Pocoyo is missing out on the fun, so they help him join in.
| 56 | 4 | "Band of Friends" | Ken Scarborough | 16 August 2006 |
Pocoyo and Pato meet a pack of sentient blocks named the Tori-Doris who make music, so they all put together a band for their friends.
| 57 | 5 | "Upside Down" | Ken Scarborough | 20 August 2006 |
While playing with his friends, Pato ends up upside down, getting stuck to the ceiling of Pocoyo World, so Pocoyo, Elly, and Baby Bird try to get him down.
| 58 | 6 | "Mad Mix Machine" | Ken Scarborough | 23 August 2006 |
Pocoyo has a machine that can merge two objects into one special object. However, this causes trouble when Pocoyo takes his friends’ things without asking, and he learns that it’s important to ask before borrowing something.
| 59 | 7 | "The Messy Guest" | Ken Scarborough | 26 August 2006 |
Pocoyo and Baby Bird meet up with their friends, but when they leave a mess behind, their friends get upset and don’t want to play with them anymore. Now the boys need to apologize to everyone and learn to clean up after themselves.
| 60 | 8 | "New on the Planet" | Ken Scarborough | 29 August 2006 |
When an alien falls from space and onto Pocoyo World, Pocoyo meets him and discovers he's shy, which explains the reason he's so scared when he's introduced to the latter's friends.
| 61 | 9 | "Pocoyo's Present" | Raye Lankford | 1 September 2006 |
When Elly spots Pocoyo with a present he refuses to open, she comes up with different plans to steal it for herself so she open it.
| 62 | 10 | "Elly's Ballet Class" | Ken Scarborough | 4 September 2006 |
Elly decides to teach her friends how to dance ballet like she does, hoping to form her own dance troupe. However, she becomes frustrated and bossy when they can’t get the moves right, which upsets them and makes them quit. Elly learns that dancing is more fun when everyone gets to enjoy themselves and dance in their own way.
| 63 | 11 | "Pocoyo's Balloon" | Joe Fallon | 7 September 2006 |
When Pocoyo accidentally lets go of his favourite red balloon, he throws a huge tantrum and drives his friends crazy as they try to cheer him up.
| 64 | 12 | "Who's Calling Me Now?" | Ken Scarborough | 10 September 2006 |
Pocoyo discovers a box full of colored whistles, but when he blows each one, it makes the onomatopoeia of one of his friends instead of a normal whistle sound. This leads to a dispute between Pocoyo and his friends, upsetting Baby Bird. They soon realize how silly they have been and decide not to play with the whistles that way again.
| 65 | 13 | "Big Scary Slide" | Raye Lankford | 13 September 2006 |
Pocoyo and his friends discover a newly-opened playground with an enormous, long slide, but Pocoyo gets scared to slide down it.
| 66 | 14 | "Elly's Shoes" | Raye Lankford | 16 September 2006 |
When Elly buys new high-heel shoes, she becomes too obsessed with them and refuses to take them off.
| 67 | 15 | "Duck Stuck" | Raye Lankford | 19 September 2006 |
Pocoyo comes across a door that leads to many different locations but when Pato goes inside it, Pocoyo must rescue him from a multiverse of dimensions.
| 68 | 16 | "Scary Noises" | Joe Fallon | 22 September 2006 |
When Pato accidentally crash-lands the Vamoosh onto a planet in space along with Pocoyo, and the two search for the detached tailfin of the rocket, Pato meets an orange alien who he quickly gets scared of.
| 69 | 17 | "Not in My Backyard" | Raye Lankford | 25 September 2006 |
When Pocoyo comes across an old tire, he uses it as a trash can for him and his friends' rubbish, but this sparks a dispute with them when no one wants the pile of rubbish near them, thus throwing it to another person.
| 70 | 18 | "Vamoosh on the Loosh" | Ken Scarborough | 28 September 2006 |
Pocoyo promises to teach Baby Bird how to drive the Vamoosh, but he keeps putting it off until later. After waiting and becoming impatient, Baby Bird decides to take the Vamoosh for a spin by himself. However, he doesn’t know how to control it, causing the Vamoosh to spin out of control and nearly crash into Caterpillar, Pato, and Elly. Pocoyo must then rush to help Baby Bird and get the Vamoosh back under control.
| 71 | 19 | "Detective Pocoyo" | Raye Lankford | 5 October 2006 |
When Elly's favourite doll goes missing, Pocoyo becomes a detective to help her find it.
| 72 | 20 | "Scooter Madness" | Raye Lankford | 8 October 2006 |
Pocoyo and Pato find Elly's missing scooter and set out to return it to her but when Pato performs a life-saving trick on it, he decides to do more cool tricks until he breaks the scooter completely.
| 73 | 21 | "Lost in Space" | Joe Fallon | 11 October 2006 |
Pocoyo, Pato, and Baby Bird take a trip to Green Alien's home planet but after Pocoyo leaves the others behind, he and Green Alien get lost.
| 74 | 22 | "Boo!" | Raye Lankford | 14 October 2006 |
Pocoyo plays a game where he scares his friends by saying "Boo!", but Pato becomes his main victim.
| 75 | 23 | "Party Pooper" | P. Kevin Strader | 17 October 2006 |
Pocoyo throws a party with his friends, but they end up not enjoying it when Pocoyo makes them do what he wants to do.
| 76 | 24 | "My Pato!" | Raye Lankford | 20 October 2006 |
It's Pato's birthday but Pocoyo and Elly argue over who gets him better birthday gifts, thus stealing his attention from each other.
| 77 | 25 | "Baby Bird Bother" | Ken Scarborough | 23 October 2006 |
Baby Bird grows a hero worship to Pocoyo, which bothers him when Baby Bird follows him everywhere and does whatever he does.
| 78 | 26 | "Dirty Dog" | Raye Lankford | 26 October 2006 |
When they realize how bad Loula smells, Pocoyo, Pato, and Elly come up with ways to get her into the bathtub.
| 79 | 27 | "The Seed" | Phill Porter | 17 February 2007 |
When Pocoyo finds a seed, he plants it and expects for a flower to grow but his friends keep trying to mess with the seed.
| 80 | 28 | "Runaway Hat" | Raye Lankford | 20 February 2007 |
When Pato loses his hat to the wind, he tries to find a replacement, worrying that his friends may laugh at his bald head.
| 81 | 29 | "Invisible Pocoyo" | Ken Scarborough | 23 February 2007 |
When Pocoyo finds a remote that can make anything invisible, he shows it to Pato and Elly who dismiss him, so he decides to get back at them by turning invisible and scaring them.
| 82 | 30 | "Noise to My Ears" | P. Kevin Strader | 26 February 2007 |
A bored Pocoyo, Elly, and Baby Bird discover the wonders of sound, but their loud playing disturbs Pato from his nap.
| 83 | 31 | "Baby Bird Sitting" | Raye Lankford | 2 March 2007 |
Pato volunteers to watch over Baby Bird (and later Caterpillar) when Sleepy Bird goes out for a while, but the two cause mayhem, driving Pato and even Pocoyo crazy.
| 84 | 32 | "Everyone's Present" | Raye Lankford | 5 March 2007 |
When Pocoyo, Pato, and Elly each receive presents (Pocoyo gets string, Pato gets paper, and Elly gets sticks), they argue over whose present is better, until they discover that putting their presents together make a kite.
| 85 | 33 | "Magic Act" | Ken Scarborough | 8 March 2007 |
Pocoyo performs magic tricks for his friends but when he keeps on messing up, he thinks his friends hate his tricks when they actually love them.
| 86 | 34 | "Picnic Puzzle" | Claudia Silver | 11 March 2007 |
Pocoyo and his friends have a picnic but when he and Elly tell Pato to watch their food, it starts moving by itself but the two don't believe him.
| 87 | 35 | "Pocoyo's Puppet Show" | Sarah Ball | 14 March 2007 |
When Pocoyo comes across a theatre with puppets, he puts on a puppet show for his friends. However, he starts using the puppets to make fun of Elly and Pato, which upsets them and hurts their feelings that they don't want to see his shows anymore.
| 88 | 36 | "Pato's Egg" | Ken Scarborough | 17 March 2007 |
When Pato finds an egg, he takes care of it until it hatches and reveals to be a baby spider, which Pocoyo and Elly are scared of. Pato learns that he won't be able to play with his friends as long as Baby Spider tags along.
| 89 | 37 | "Dance Off!" | Ken Scarborough | 20 March 2007 |
Pocoyo and Pato have a dance battle to see who has better moves, but Elly shows the boys how they all can just dance together.
| 90 | 38 | "Get Lost Loula" | Pippin Parker | 23 March 2007 |
When Pocoyo gets jealous after Loula wins a game of hide-and-seek, he tricks her into running away. His friends are upset by what he did, and Pocoyo soon realizes that it was a very mean thing to do. With his friends’ help, he sets out to find Loula and bring her safely back home.
| 91 | 39 | "Sneaky Shoes" | Pippin Parker | 26 March 2007 |
Sick and tired of losing games all the time, Pato comes across a pair of red shoes that make him run super fast when he puts them on. Pato decides to use the shoes to cheat in a foot race and a long jump match against Pocoyo and Elly, causing them to give up on competing altogether. But when the shoes get stuck on Pato’s feet, Pocoyo and Elly must rescue him before he—or anyone else—gets hurt.
| 92 | 40 | "Shutterbug" | Andrew Bernhardt | 29 March 2007 |
Pato wants to take a photoshoot with Pocoyo, Elly, and Baby Bird but the attempt ends up a failure when the three keep goofing off, raging Pato.
| 93 | 41 | "Angry Alien" | Ken Scarborough | 3 April 2007 |
When an enraged martian named Angry Alien tries to take over Pocoyo World, his evil plan gets thwarted when Pocoyo and his friends want him to play with them.
| 94 | 42 | "Pato Underwater" | Ken Scarborough | 6 April 2007 |
Pato goes underwater for a playdate with Fred and Whale but ends up wanting to go back home when he realizes he can't play any normal game due to the water.
| 95 | 43 | "Pato's Paintings" | Ken Scarborough | 9 April 2007 |
Pato refuses to paint a picture for an art exhibition because he's nervous of what people will think of his work, so he decides to turn in a counterfeit painting instead.
| 96 | 44 | "Monster Mystery" | Raye Lankford | 12 April 2007 |
Pocoyo draws a monster face on a box in an attempt to scare Pato and Elly but they don't fall for it. When he throws it away, it falls on Sleepy Bird and she chases the three, who think she's an actual monster.
| 97 | 45 | "Poczilla" | Ken Scarborough | 15 April 2007 |
When Pocoyo and Pato come across a mini-civilization, they pretend to be the monsters from their favourite comic book (a parody of Godzilla and King Kong), unknowingly scaring away the city's residents, a population of sentient bouncy balls.
| 98 | 46 | "Elly on Ice" | Ken Scarborough | 18 April 2007 |
When she sees her friends ice skating in an ice rink as part of a competition, Elly wants to join but realizes she's terrible at ice skating.
| 99 | 47 | "Farewell Friends" | Ken Scarborough | 21 April 2007 |
Pato decides to move away from Pocoyo World and spends the day saying goodbye to all his friends before his departure.
| 100 | 48 | "Double Trouble" | Tim Johnson | 24 April 2007 |
When he wants someone just like him to play with him, Pato invents a cloning machine to befriend himself, but things go awry when Pato clones himself multiple times and the clones cause mayhem in Pocoyo World.
| 101 | 49 | "Horse!" | Ken Scarborough | 27 April 2007 |
When Pocoyo learns about horses, he becomes obsessed with wanting to ride one, and drives his friends crazy in the process.
| 102 | 50 | "Elly's Tea Party" | Raye Lankford | 30 April 2007 |
Elly invites Pocoyo, Pato, and Baby Bird to her tea party but the skeptical boys know how bossy Elly is at her tea parties. Due to this, the boys try to steal her biscuits to avoid attending but fail miserably.
| 103 | 51 | "Talent Show" | Ken Scarborough | 3 May 2007 |
Pocoyo and his friends put on a talent show but Caterpillar is too scared to show off her talent.
| 104 | 52 | "Remember When…" | Ken Scarborough | 6 May 2007 |
Pocoyo, Pato, and Elly showcase their favourite moments in Pocoyo World (primarily clips from previous episodes), but this sparks a dispute when the clips also show embarrassing moments of each other.

=== Series 3: Let's Go Pocoyo (2010) ===
Every episode in this series is written by Ken Scarborough & Raye Lankford.

| No. overall | No. in series | Title | Original release date |
|---|---|---|---|
| 105 | 1 | "Pocoyo's Band" | 3 July 2010 |
Pocoyo finds a box full of musical instruments (a trumpet, a drum, and a guitar) and decides to form a band with Pato and Elly. However, their performance doesn't go as expected.
| 106 | 2 | "Picnic" | 5 July 2010 |
Pocoyo, Pato, and Elly have a picnic, but when their food grows a life of their own and starts running away from them, the three chase it back.
| 107 | 3 | "Pato's Shower" | 8 July 2010 |
Pato prepares to take a shower, but when Pocoyo and his friends steal his soap, brush, and towel, he sets out to get it back.
| 108 | 4 | "The Garden" | 10 July 2010 |
After seeing Pato's beautiful flower garden, Pocoyo wants to grow his own garden, but when Pato gives him instructions on how to grow a garden, Pocoyo follows anything but the rules.
| 109 | 5 | "Pato the Postman" | 13 July 2010 |
Pato becomes a postman to deliver Pocoyo's letter to Elly but gets overwhelmed when he's forced to mail in too many deliveries.
| 110 | 6 | "Colours" | 15 July 2010 |
Pocoyo meets sentient coloured blocks, but when he gets Pato over to see them, they hide in his block tower.
| 111 | 7 | "Ready, Steady, Go!" | 18 July 2010 |
Pocoyo, Pato, and Elly compete in a foot race but due to their competitive nature, they break the rules of the game and use scooters and later cars to pass the finish line first.
| 112 | 8 | "Camping" | 20 July 2010 |
Pocoyo, Pato, and Elly go camping but get scared when they hear an eerie noise.
| 113 | 9 | "Space Mission" | 23 July 2010 |
Pocoyo and Pato build a rocket ship so they can fly to space with Green Alien and bring him home.
| 114 | 10 | "Travel with Pato" | 25 July 2010 |
When Pato forgets his suitcase at home when he's about to leave on a flight, Pocoyo and Elly use multiple modes of transportation to retrieve it to him (most specifically running, riding a bus, and a train).
| 115 | 11 | "Playtime" | 28 July 2010 |
Pocoyo prepares to play with his toys (his blocks, his puzzle pieces, and his bouncy ball), but when Pato, Elly, and Caterpillar steal and play with them, he gets angry, taking them back.
| 116 | 12 | "Tennis for Everyone" | 30 July 2010 |
Pocoyo and his friends play tennis, but he and Elly can't beat champion Pato, and the two won't let Caterpillar play because of her small size.
| 117 | 13 | "Hide and Seek" | 2 August 2010 |
Pocoyo plays hide-and-seek with his friends but has trouble finding them.
| 118 | 14 | "Party Time" | 4 August 2010 |
Pocoyo, Pato, and Elly set up a birthday party for someone, but when Fred offers to help, it becomes chaos for him.
| 119 | 15 | "Wheels" | 7 August 2010 |
Pocoyo, Pato, and Elly ride their favourite vehicles (Pocoyo rides a scooter, Elly rides a bicycle, and Pato rides a skateboard), but when Caterpillar also wants to ride with them, she can't find any vehicle her size.
| 120 | 16 | "Elly's Bath" | 9 August 2010 |
Pocoyo wants to play ball with Elly, but she's too busy taking a bath with her rubber duckie and brush.
| 121 | 17 | "The Amazing Tower" | 12 August 2010 |
Pato builds a block tower, but when he lends Pocoyo some of his blocks, he takes advantage of it and steals all of Pato's blocks, angering him.
| 122 | 18 | "Pocoyo's New Toys" | 14 August 2010 |
Pocoyo spots his friends playing with cool toys (Elly plays with a hula-hoop, Baby Bird and Caterpillar fly a kite, and Pato plays with a jump rope), but when he tries to go play with them, it doesn't go very well.
| 123 | 19 | "Bathing Loula" | 17 August 2010 |
When Loula gets dirty, Pocoyo and Elly try to take her a bath with a soap, brush, and towel.
| 124 | 20 | "Magic Fingers" | 19 August 2010 |
Pocoyo performs a magic trick by making his fingers, hands, and legs disappear, impressing his friends.
| 125 | 21 | "Cooking with Elly" | 22 August 2010 |
Elly bakes a cake for a special occasion, but when Pocoyo and Pato accidentally smush it, they have to help Elly bake another one.
| 126 | 22 | "Elly's Market" | 24 August 2010 |
Elly opens a fruit market with apples, oranges, and bananas, but when Pocoyo and Pato mess around with the stand, it breaks down, forcing them to help Elly rebuild it.
| 127 | 23 | "Pato's Bedtime" | 27 August 2010 |
It's nighttime, but Pato finds it hard to sleep when Pocoyo stays up, playing with his toys.
| 128 | 24 | "A Hole in One" | 29 August 2010 |
Elly enjoys playing golf, but when Pocoyo wants to play too, he cheats the game.
| 129 | 25 | "Pocoyo's Camera" | 3 September 2010 |
Pocoyo comes across a camera and learns what it's for, but ends up taking pictures of his friends in their most embarrassing moment, angering them.
| 130 | 26 | "Painting with Pocoyo" | 5 September 2010 |
Pocoyo, Pato, and Elly paint a still life of fruit, but when Baby Bird comes along, he eats all the fruit.
| 131 | 27 | "Playing Dress Up" | 8 September 2010 |
Pocoyo, Pato, and Elly play dress up (Elly wears black-and-white polka-dot shoes, Pato wears a red hat and bow tie, and Pocoyo wears his pajamas), but when Caterpillar wants to join in, there is no outfit her size.
| 132 | 28 | "Magic Box" | 10 September 2010 |
Pocoyo has two magic boxes where if he puts an object inside one box, it will teleport into the other box. When he does the trick with Pato's favourite bouncy ball, he gets angry with him.
| 133 | 29 | "Pocoyo's Restaurant" | 13 September 2010 |
Pocoyo and Elly open a restaurant but must find a way to satisfy their customer Angry Alien.
| 134 | 30 | "Wake Up, Pocoyo!" | 15 September 2010 |
When Pocoyo refuses to wake up and get out of bed in the morning, Pato tries to help.
| 135 | 31 | "Ahoy, Pocoyo!" | 18 September 2010 |
Pocoyo and Pato pretend to be pirates in a search for treasure guarded by a monster (Loula) by using a map and a telescope, but chaos arises when the boys are chased by two piranhas (Baby Bird and Caterpillar) and the monster wakes up.
| 136 | 32 | "Elly's Computer" | 20 September 2010 |
Pocoyo wants to play ball with Elly, but she's too busy playing a video game on her computer.
| 137 | 33 | "Going to the Beach" | 6 October 2010 |
When they receive postcards from Elly who's at a trip to the beach, Pocoyo and Pato decide to make their own beach with a spade, a bucket, a sandbox, and sunglasses.
| 138 | 34 | "Big & Small" | 8 October 2010 |
Pocoyo finds a remote that can increase or decrease the size of things, but his friends get angry when he leaves their stuff either big or small.
| 139 | 35 | "Face Painting" | 11 October 2010 |
Elly wants Pocoyo and Pato to paint a portrait of her new doll, but the boys end up painting portraits of her body parts instead, angering Elly.
| 140 | 36 | "Supermarket" | 13 October 2010 |
Pocoyo and Pato open up a supermarket (with bottles, cartons, and cans), but Elly keeps ordering too much stuff, tiring out the boys.
| 141 | 37 | "Elly's Playhouse" | 16 October 2010 |
Elly builds a new playhouse, but when Pocoyo and Pato unintentionally destroy it, they help Elly rebuild it.
| 142 | 38 | "Pocoyo's Puppet Theatre" | 18 October 2010 |
When Pocoyo finds a box full of puppets that look like him and his friends, he and Elly build a puppet theatre to put on a show for their friends.
| 143 | 39 | "Up & Down" | 21 October 2010 |
Pocoyo teaches Baby Bird the difference between up and down in many ways. First, he uses a see-saw for example, and then uses a long slide, and later uses the Vamoosh to fly to space and back.
| 144 | 40 | "Pocoyo's Breakfast" | 23 October 2010 |
When Pocoyo refuses to eat the breakfast Elly made for him (milk, cereal, and orange juice), he sets out to find someone else's breakfast to eat but doesn't like what they serve.
| 145 | 41 | "Traffic Jam" | 26 October 2010 |
Pocoyo becomes a traffic policeman with a whistle, but chaos ensues when no one follows his signals, Pato needs to cross the street, and a huge collision commences.
| 146 | 42 | "Pato's Living Room" | 28 October 2010 |
Pato has a living room and wants to watch TV, but when Pocoyo, Caterpillar, and Loula want to join him, Pato kicks them all out.
| 147 | 43 | "Cinema" | 5 November 2010 |
Pato opens a cinema for his friends to watch a film about him, but when a glitched projector ruins the film, thus embarrassing Pato, his friends recreate the film to make him feel better.
| 148 | 44 | "Elly's New Doll" | 7 November 2010 |
Elly gets a new doll, but when she tells Pocoyo and Pato to watch over it while she goes out to get something, the boys argue for it, thus breaking the doll.
| 149 | 45 | "Circus" | 10 November 2010 |
Pocoyo, Pato, and Elly perform a circus for their friends. Pocoyo is the ringmaster, Elly is the acrobatic, and Pato is the clown.
| 150 | 46 | "The Best Bedroom" | 12 November 2010 |
Pocoyo, Pato, and Elly argue over whose bedroom is better. Elly has a wardrobe, Pato has a lamp, and Pocoyo has a toy box.
| 151 | 47 | "Pocoyo Goes to School" | 15 November 2010 |
Elly plays a game of school with Baby Bird and Caterpillar, as Pocoyo and Pato refuse to join. After seeing how fun school can be, the boys later change their minds.
| 152 | 48 | "Art" | 17 November 2010 |
Pocoyo and his friends make multiple types of art at a museum (Pocoyo makes a painting, Elly makes a frame full of pictures, and Baby Bird and Caterpillar make a sculpture), but the art critic Pato dislikes everyone's work.
| 153 | 49 | "Pocoyo Recycles" | 20 November 2010 |
When Pocoyo and Pato learn about recycling, they along with Elly and Fred find multiple things to recycle.
| 154 | 50 | "Down on the Farm" | 22 November 2010 |
Pocoyo, Pato, and Elly tend to a vegetable garden full of lettuce, tomatoes, and carrots, but the food later grow a mind of their own and run away from the garden, forcing the three to chase after it.
| 155 | 51 | "Nurse Elly" | 25 November 2010 |
When Pocoyo pretends to be sick to get out of tidying up, Elly becomes a nurse along with her assistant Pato to take care of him.
| 156 | 52 | "Fishing with Pocoyo" | 27 November 2010 |
Pocoyo and Pato go out fishing together in a lake with their bait being Caterpillar, but when she befriends a fish, they both play pranks on the boys, angering them.

=== Series 4 (2016–2021) ===
| No. overall | No. in series | Title | Written by | Original release date | Prod. code |
|---|---|---|---|---|---|
Part 1
| 157 | 1 | "Holidays" | Mike de Sève | 28 November 2016 | 401 |
When Pocoyo, Pato, and Elly reunite with each other after each going on vacation, they all tell each other what they did while they were gone, but no one believes each other's story.
| 158 | 2 | "Christmas Tree" | Mike de Sève | 16 December 2016 | 402 |
When Pato can't bare to live with the regret of cutting down a tree for Christmas, Pocoyo and his friends cheer him up by making their own Christmas tree.
| 159 | 3 | "Chicks Dig Me" | Dave Benjoya & Mike de Sève | 27 January 2017 | 404 |
When Pocoyo comes across a nest with three chicks and no mother found, he decides to take care of them until their mother returns, but when he is unable to get them under control, Pato comes in and babysits like a pro.
| 160 | 4 | "Call Me" | Joe Vitale | 17 February 2017 | 405 |
When Pato buys a new phone, he tries to get used to its advanced technology, but gets distracted by his friends' festivities.
| 161 | 5 | "Muck Struck" | Mike de Sève | 3 March 2017 | 407 |
When Pocoyo, Pato, and Elly notice their water is oddly brown, they discover that its source: a pond has been polluted, so decide to clean it up.
| 162 | 6 | "Nina" | Mike de Sève | 24 March 2017 | 409 |
Pocoyo meets a girl named Nina and her pet robot Roberto and discovers that they have been living under Pato's flower garden the whole time.
| 163 | 7 | "Hack Attack" | Joe Vitale | 14 April 2017 | 408 |
Nina goes to get her frisbee to play with Pocoyo, Pato, and Elly, but when she tells them to watch over Roberto, they accidentally malfunction him.
| 164 | 8 | "Hole Lotta Trouble" | Joe Vitale | 28 April 2017 | 403 |
Pocoyo, Pato, and Elly play with marbles but when they discover a black hole that sucks up everything in Pocoyo World, the three find themselves in dimension after dimension with Pocoyo's black marble being the only key to getting home.
| 165 | 9 | "Great Shot!" | Mike de Sève | 12 May 2017 | 413 |
Pocoyo and Nina's peaceful tennis game turns into a battle of sports when the two, along with Pato and Elly, compete to score more points than each other.
| 166 | 10 | "Disco Fleaver" | Joe Vitale | 19 May 2017 | 411 |
When Loula keeps scratching herself, Nina shrinks her and Pocoyo via Roberto and discover that Loula has fleas who throw a disco party on her fur, so they try to get them to play something soothing instead.
| 167 | 11 | "House of Colors" | Mike de Sève | 9 June 2017 | 410 |
Elly paints her house pink but when Pocoyo and Pato offer to help, they end painting it different colours instead, angering her.
| 168 | 12 | "Summer Hike" | Dave Benjoya & Mike de Sève | 30 June 2017 | 419 |
When it's the hottest day of the year, Pato invites Pocoyo and Nina to join him on a hiking trip, but ends up not enjoying it himself.
| 169 | 13 | "Bumbleberry Surprise" | Aron Dunn | 7 July 2017 | 412 |
When they are hungry, Nina shrinks her, Pocoyo, Pato, and Elly in order for them to pick out the rare fruit bumbleberries, and make a cake.
| 170 | 14 | "Are We There Yet?" | Dave Benjoya & Mike de Sève | 21 July 2017 | 425 |
Elly wants to go on a relaxing vacation to the beach, but chaos ensues when Pato, Nina, Pocoyo, and Loula tag along with her.
| 171 | 15 | "Tourist Trapped" | Aron Dunn | 11 August 2017 | 416 |
A group of green aliens visit Pocoyo World and take pictures of everyone for an album, but Pocoyo feels as if his privacy has been invaded when the aliens start following him everywhere.
| 172 | 16 | "Time After Time Before Time" | Dave Benjoya & Mike de Sève | 8 September 2017 | 414 |
When Elly slips on a banana skin and drops her homemade cupcakes, Pocoyo and Nina go back in time via Roberto to before Elly dropped her cupcakes but end up going too far back.
| 173 | 17 | "Tiny Fun Park" | Dave Benjoya & Mike de Sève | 22 September 2017 | 422 |
When Pocoyo, Pato, Elly, Nina, and Roberto can no longer go to the park due to the buses being full, Nina shrinks her and her friends and use the objects at their house as park rides.
| 174 | 18 | "Halloween Tales" | Mike de Sève | 13 October 2017 | 421 |
It's Nina's first Halloween but when she thinks the holiday is silly, Pocoyo, Pato, and Elly try to scare her by telling her spooky stories about them.
| 175 | 19 | "Rock Is a Hard Place" | Dave Benjoya & Mike de Sève | 10 November 2017 | 420 |
After Pocoyo and his friends' unintentional rock performance becomes a critical hit, they are offered to perform to a live audience, but each of their nature to be the spotlight during the show causes them to flop hard.
| 176 | 20 | "Angry Alien Strikes Back" | Joe Vitale | 15 November 2017 | 406 |
Angry Alien returns with his new invention that will let him swap bodies with Pocoyo as part of his evil plan to mock his friends, but things go awry when no one gets bothered by him, and Pocoyo, in Angry Alien's body, gets chased by Caterpillar, who has a crush on him. Note: This episode is a direct sequel to the series 2 episode "Angry Alien".
| 177 | 21 | "Magic Words" | Jymn Magon | 16 November 2017 | 415 |
Pocoyo discovers that whenever the Audience calls out an object, it instantly spawns, angering him when the Audience calls out in the worst-case scenario.
| 178 | 22 | "Sleep Guard" | Michael Dobkins | 18 November 2017 | 418 |
When Sleepy Bird is trying to take a nap, Pocoyo volunteers to be her sleep guard, silencing any noise that might disturb her.
| 179 | 23 | "Insert Coin" | Joe Vitale | 19 November 2017 | 426 |
When Angry Alien steals Elly's doll, Daisy, Pocoyo sets out to get it back from him, in the style of a retro video game.
| 180 | 24 | "Space Postal Service" | Joe Vitale | 8 December 2017 | 423 |
Pato the Postman returns once again with his new assistant Baby Bird to deliver a package to Green Alien in space, but gets frustrated when he learns that Green Alien has moved to multiple different locations.
| 181 | 25 | "An Alien Christmas Carol" | Mike de Sève | 15 December 2017 | 424 |
It is revealed that Angry Alien has hated Christmas ever since his father left one Christmas morning and never returned, so he sets out to ruin Christmas for Pocoyo and his friends.
| 182 | 26 | "Dance Off Part Two" | Dave Benjoya & Mike de Sève | 22 December 2017 | 417 |
When Elly and Nina rub it in when they come up with a new dance, Pocoyo and Pato challenge them to a dance off to see who's really better at dancing. Note: This episode is a direct sequel to the series 2 episode "Dance Off!".
Part 2
| 183 | 27 | "The Grand Final" | Carlos Bleycher | 3 November 2020 | 427 |
When Pocoyo sees Pato and Elly play basketball, he wants to join them but is not very good at it, forcing Pato and Elly to play without him. An enraged Pocoyo decides to get back at them by constantly interrupting their game with his toys.
| 184 | 28 | "Slippery Pato" | Carlos Bleycher | 4 November 2020 | 428 |
When Pato pours too much moisturizing oil on himself, he becomes too slippery to play with his friends. His friends decide not to play with him until they must save him when Pato uncontrollably starts sliding too fast.
| 185 | 29 | "The Dino Box" | Carlos Bleycher | 5 November 2020 | 429 |
Pocoyo invents a box that turns people into dinosaurs when they get inside it, but when Pato tests out the new invention, it becomes successful and he becomes Pocoyo's new dinosaur pet. However, chaos ensues when Elly also hops inside the box and turns into a dinosaur and she and Pato battle with each other, destroying everything in sight.
| 186 | 30 | "Pirates" | Leyre Medrano | 6 November 2020 | 430 |
Pocoyo pretends to be a pirate but when he discovers that Pato has built an actual pirate ship, he battles him in order to plant his flag on the ship.
| 187 | 31 | "The Pink Perfume" | Leyre Medrano | 7 November 2020 | 431 |
Elly buys a new perfume and doesn't want to use it all up, but when Pocoyo finds and steals it, he ends up finishing it fast, making Elly sad.
| 188 | 32 | "Robot Pocoyo" | Leyre Medrano | 8 November 2020 | 432 |
Pocoyo is a huge fan of robots that he pretends to be one, but his actions just make things worse for his friends.
| 189 | 33 | "Pato's Phone" | Carlos Bleycher | 9 November 2020 | 433 |
Pato gets obsessed with his new phone and can't take his eyes off it, worrying Pocoyo and Elly so they try to get his eyes anywhere but the screen.
| 190 | 34 | "Fancy Dress Party" | Carlos Bleycher | 10 November 2020 | 434 |
Pocoyo World hosts a party and anyone who attends with the fanciest outfit will win a trophy, but Pato can't seem to find the perfect outfit.
| 191 | 35 | "Strike!" | Carlos Bleycher | 11 November 2020 | 435 |
Pato becomes obsessed with trying to knock a pin down when he's playing bowling, but Pocoyo and Elly try and win effortlessly.
| 192 | 36 | "Let's Tidy Up!" | Carlos Bleycher | 12 November 2020 | 436 |
Pato tidies up his room but when Pocoyo and Elly visit, they constantly leave everything a mess without cleaning up.
| 193 | 37 | "The Balloon" | Leyre Medrano & Tim Bain | 13 November 2020 | 437 |
Pocoyo and Pato want to play with Nina's favourite red balloon, but when they lose it to Angry Alien, they must get it back.
| 194 | 38 | "The Silence Challenge" | Leyre Medrano | 14 November 2020 | 438 |
When Pocoyo, Pato, and Elly think the Narrator talks too much, they challenge him to keep quiet as long as possible.
| 195 | 39 | "Overprotective Roberto" | Tim Bain | 15 November 2020 | 439 |
After Nina suffers a scrape on her leg, Roberto goes to the extreme to keep Nina safe from all harm, including playing with her friends.
| 196 | 40 | "Pocoyo's Car" | Lina Foti | 16 November 2020 | 440 |
Pocoyo thinks he's getting too old for his baby toys and tries to get rid of them, but when he gets stuck in his toy car, he refuses to ask for help to get it off him or to give the toy to Nina.
| 197 | 41 | "Inventions" | Carlos Bleycher | 17 November 2020 | 441 |
Pocoyo and Nina are invited to Pato's hot dog party, but when they learn they have chores to do (feed Loula, read a book to Baby Bird and Caterpillar, and help Elly make a cake), they decide to make inventions to speed up the process.
| 198 | 42 | "My Hero" | Carlos Bleycher | 18 November 2020 | 442 |
When Pocoyo helps Caterpillar get unstuck from a golf hole, she wants to repay his dept by "helping" him win a golf tournament against Pato.
| 199 | 43 | "The Rescue" | Lina Foti | 19 November 2020 | 443 |
When Caterpillar gets stuck atop a tree, Pocoyo, Pato, and Elly brainstorm ideas to help get her down.
| 200 | 44 | "Pocoyo's Friend" | Lina Foti | 20 November 2020 | 444 |
Pocoyo plays with his imaginary friend, but when Pato and Elly also want to play with the former, they try to get him to take his mind off of playing with literally nobody.
| 201 | 45 | "Elly's Picnic" | Tim Bain | 21 November 2020 | 445 |
Elly sets up a picnic and invites Pocoyo, Pato, and Nina to join her but when Nina brings her ant friends with her, they steal all of the food forcing Elly, Pocoyo, and Pato to get them back.
| 202 | 46 | "Nina Discovers the World" | Tim Bain | 22 November 2020 | 446 |
When he discovers that Nina still doesn't know what some everyday objects are, Pocoyo decides to teach her everything she needs to know about them.
| 203 | 47 | "The Remote Control" | Lina Foti | 23 November 2020 | 447 |
When Pocoyo discovers that his TV remote can pause, play, fast forward, and rewind reality, he has fun taunting his friends with his new ability.
| 204 | 48 | "The Tennis Racket" | Lina Foti | 24 November 2020 | 448 |
Elly wants to play a tennis match against Pocoyo and Pato but the two end up switching the rules of the game.
| 205 | 49 | "Nina the Dog Trainer" | Lorin Clarke & Lina Foti | 25 November 2020 | 449 |
When Nina volunteers to train Loula, Pocoyo gives her some picture cards to show what she needs to train Loula, but she ends up ignoring them, causing chaos to ensue.
| 206 | 50 | "Prank Day" | Tim Bain | 26 November 2020 | 450 |
When Pocoyo decides to prank his friends, including the Narrator, they all come up with a plan to get back at him.
| 207 | 51 | "I Don't Want to Go to Sleep" | Lina Foti | 27 November 2020 | 451 |
When Pocoyo stays up all night to play with his toys, causing him to feel sleepy in the morning, his friends come up with a way to lull him back into bed.
| 208 | 52 | "Winter Games" | Carlos Bleycher | 28 November 2020 | 452 |
Pocoyo World hosts an Olympic-themed Winter Games event but Pocoyo becomes only focused on winning first place, tiring out his teammate Yanko. Note: This episode is not Yanko's first appearance, as he first appears in the Christmas special "A Very Special Guest".
| 209 | 53 | "Dragon Island" | Carlos Bleycher & Leyre Medrano | 8 July 2021 (Note: Unlike the other episodes, this episode did not air on ABC Kids and was instead cinematically released at Cine Capitol. It was later released on YouTube on 18 March 2024.) | 453 |
Pocoyo, Pato, and Elly go on an adventure in Gran Canaria to find the legend of a lost dragon. Note: This episode features a hybrid animation between 3D animation and live-action shots.

==== Series 4 – Special Episodes (2016–2025) ====
| No. overall | No. in series | Title | Written by | YouTube release date |
|---|---|---|---|---|
Series 4 – Special Episodes
| 210 | 1 | "Crazy Inventions" | Alfonso Rodríguez | 28 October 2016 |
After another invention of Pocoyo's goes awry, he and Elly venture inside it to rescue their test subject Pato after the machine suffers from a virus.
| 211 | 2 | "Easter Eggs" | Alfonso Rodríguez | 7 April 2017 |
Elly starts an Easter egg hunt with her friends after she creates a machine that decorates chocolate eggs. But she mistakes Sleepy Bird's egg for an Easter egg and her friends go on a rampage trying to catch it.
| 212 | 3 | "Pocoyo and Nina's Terror Show" | Alfonso Rodríguez | 20 October 2017 |
Pocoyo and Nina put on a spooky puppet show for their friends but end up looking funny to them. Their laughing stock, however, is short-lived when a group of mariachi-playing skeletons known as Los Hermanos Chihuahua takeover the show and scare everyone.
| 213 | 4 | "Pocoyo's Christmas Carol" | Alfonso Rodríguez | 15 December 2018 (Note: This episode was first released on Amazon Prime Video on 21 December 2017.) |
When Pocoyo and Pato squash over a ball, Elly summons the Three Ghosts of Christmas to teach the boys the true meaning of that holiday. Note: This episode is a parody of the 1843 novella A Christmas Carol by Charles Dickens.
| 214 | 5 | "Nina's Easter Day" | Alfonso Rodríguez | 24 March 2018 |
Nina and Roberto steal Pocoyo, Pato, and Elly's Easter eggs, thinking each have little chicks in them like bird eggs, forcing the three to chase after them.
| 215 | 6 | "The Big Soccer Match" | Alfonso Rodríguez | 1 July 2018 |
After getting rejected by Pocoyo's soccer team, Nina is trained by Roberto on how to play soccer properly. Later, she starts her own soccer team to dominate Pocoyo's. Note: This is a 2018 FIFA World Cup special.
| 216 | 7 | "Pocoyo and the Haunted House" | Alfonso Rodríguez | 3 November 2018 |
Pocoyo and Pato visit a haunted house for trick-or-treat but as they go in, Pato gets scared of everything so Pocoyo shows him there's nothing to be afraid of. Note: This episode is a parody of the 1839 poem The Haunted Palace by Edgar Allan Poe.
| 217 | 8 | "You Are Welcome for Thanksgiving" | Alfonso Rodríguez | 16 November 2018 |
It's Thanksgiving but after Fred teaches Pocoyo and Nina how to give thanks, they take advantage of it as they annoy Pato by saying "Thank you!" constantly.
| 218 | 9 | "A Very Special Guest" | Leyre Medrano & Carlos Bleycher | 22 November 2019 (Note: This episode was first released on Amazon Prime Video on 30 November 2018.) |
While searching for lost ornaments, Pocoyo and Loula meet a friendly yeti named Yanko and invite him over to their friends' Christmas dinner. However, Pocoyo's friends reject him because they're scared of him so Pocoyo shows them he's not as scary as he looks.
| 219 | 10 | "The Easter Rabbit" | Leyre Medrano | 29 March 2019 |
Pocoyo, Nina, and Pato have gotten their Easter eggs stolen by the Easter Rabbit, who has hid them in three different locations and gives them pictures as clues to where they are. However, Pato gets enraged when everyone finds their egg except for him.
| 220 | 11 | "Space Holidays" | Leyre Medrano | 21 June 2019 |
Pocoyo and Pato argue whether to go to the beach or the mountains for their summer vacation, so Elly decides to take them to space instead.
| 221 | 12 | "Back to School" | Leyre Medrano | 23 August 2019 |
It's the first day of school and everyone is excited to go except Pocoyo who prefers to stay home and play with his toys. However, he later feels lonely when nobody is anywhere but school.
| 222 | 13 | "Halloween Potion" | Leyre Medrano, Alfonso Rodríguez, & Carlos Bleycher | 4 October 2019 |
Pocoyo, Pato, and Caterpillar drink Elly's pumpkin soup but every time Caterpillar drinks it, she turns into a monster. Only Pato witnesses it as no else believes him.
| 223 | 14 | "World Domination on Ice" | Leyre Medrano | 13 December 2019 |
Angry Alien threatens to conquer Pocoyo World once again but his plan backfires when everyone is playing in the snow and he meets their new friend Yanko.
Pocoyo 2020 AIE
| 224 | 15 | "Caterpillar's Egg" | Carlos Bleycher | 20 March 2020 |
Pocoyo and his friends have an Easter egg hunt but Elly can't find Caterpillar's egg while everyone else remains successful.
| 225 | 16 | "Dinosaurs" | Carlos Bleycher | 17 April 2020 |
Pocoyo, Pato, and Elly argue over which dinosaur is more ferocious but their playing bothers Sleepy Bird from her nap.
| 226 | 17 | "Formula Pato" | Carlos Bleycher | 26 June 2020 |
In order to win "The Great Race of Pocoyo", Pato brings his car to life. However, the car's only wish is helping people, which drags Pato off-course. Note: This episode is a promotion to the release of Pocoyo Racing for mobile.
| 227 | 18 | "The Colouring Book" | Leyre Medrano | 4 September 2020 |
Pocoyo has a colouring book that changes the colours around him according to which page it's on. Though this starts a feud between him and his friends causing all the colour in Pocoyo World to disappear, including theirs. Note: This episode is a promotion to the release of Pocoyo Colors for mobile.
| 228 | 19 | "The Ball Orchestra's Party" | Leyre Medrano | 25 September 2020 |
Pocoyo, Pato, and Elly have been invited to the Ball Orchestra's party, but the directions lead them to multiple dimensions where they must solve puzzles in order for them to get to the party.
| 229 | 20 | "The Reflection" | Carlos Bleycher | 9 October 2020 |
Pocoyo (in his witch costume) unknowingly casts a spell on his mirror causing his witch persona reflection to escape. The reflection wreaks havoc in Pocoyo World by stealing people's candy.
| 230 | 21 | "Elly's Magic Wand" | Lina Foti | 16 October 2020 |
Witch Elly and her apprentices Pocoyo and Pato are making a potion, but when she tells the boys to watch her wand while she's away, they end up losing it. The wand falls into Caterpillar's grasp, who unknowingly uses it in dangerous ways.
| 231 | 22 | "Space Christmas" | Leyre Medrano | 22 November 2020 |
Pocoyo, Pato, and Elly celebrate Christmas with Angry Alien at his house in space, much to his dismay who prefers spending Christmas alone.
| 232 | 23 | "Christmas Far from Home" | Leyre Medrano | 27 November 2020 |
Pocoyo and his friends visit the South Pole to celebrate Christmas with Yanko but Pato isn't having a good time as expected.
Pocoyo 2021 AIE
| 233 | 24 | "Easter Eggs Surprise" | Leyre Medrano | 2 April 2021 |
After he and his friends' Easter eggs are stolen, Detective Pocoyo returns along with his assistants Pato and Elly to search for who stole the eggs.
| 234 | 25 | "The Videogame Party" | Leyre Medrano | 16 April 2021 |
Pocoyo and his friends celebrate the arrival of spring by throwing a party, but Angry Alien steals the invitations, forcing them to play the franchise's newest console game, Pocoyo Party to get them back. Note: This episode is a promotion and follow-up to Pocoyo Party for PlayStation 4 and Nintendo Switch.
| 235 | 26 | "Pocoyo's World Sports Games" | Leyre Medrano | 16 July 2021 |
Pocoyo is hosting the Pocoyo World Sports Games, a sporting event where his friends compete in various competitions, but isn't being fair as he's giving first place medals to whomever he wants, leaving the other winners ticked. Note: This is a 2020 Tokyo Olympics special.
| 236 | 27 | "The Treasure Hunt" | Leyre Medrano | 30 July 2021 |
Pocoyo, Pato, and Elly become pirates searching for treasure using a map that leads them to different locations.
| 237 | 28 | "Yanko's First Day" | Leyre Medrano | 13 August 2021 |
It's the first day of school but when Yanko is nervous to go to school for the first time, Pocoyo and his friends show him how fun school can be.
| 238 | 29 | "The Big Match" | Leyre Medrano | 19 May 2023 (Note: This episode was first released on HBO Max in select countries on 31 August 2021.) |
In a football match, "The Patos" (Los Patos) take on "The Ellys" (Elly's United FC), but Pocoyo breaks the rules of the game, angering the referee Fred. Note: This is a 2021 FIFA Club World Cup special, despite the event being delayed to 2022.
| 239 | 30 | "Angry Alien's First Halloween" | Leyre Medrano | 15 October 2021 |
Angry Alien once again attempts to conquer Pocoyo World, but it's Halloween and gets scared by Pocoyo and his friends dressed up in spooky costumes.
| 240 | 31 | "Pocoyo's Scary Halloween" | Leyre Medrano & Carlos Bleycher | 11 October 2024 (Note: This episode first aired on Cartoonito in the United States on 25 October 2021.) |
Pocoyo hires Los Hermanos Chihuahua to scare Pato and Elly, but the two's Halloween face masks help them regain ground and scare the hermanos back.
| 241 | 32 | "Day of the Dead" | Leyre Medrano | 1 November 2024 (Note: This episode first aired on Cartoonito in the United States on 1 November 2021.) (Latin Spanish) |
Pato celebrates the Day of the Dead by honoring his deceased grandfather who surprisingly makes an unexpected return to the living thanks to Nina.
| 242 | 33 | "Christmas… at the Beach?" | Leyre Medrano & Tatiana Chisleanschi | 12 November 2021 |
Yanko plans to celebrate Christmas with his parents, but Pocoyo, Pato, and Baby Bird drag him over to celebrate Christmas with them at the beach, much to his dismay.
| 243 | 34 | "The Christmas Tree" | Leyre Medrano | 18 December 2024 (Note: This episode was first released on HBO Max in select countries on 21 November 2021.) |
When they discover that Yanko doesn't know how to decorate a Christmas tree, Pocoyo and Pato teach him how, but the boys end up getting into an argument over how the tree should be decorated, thus destroying the tree and enraging Yanko.
| 244 | 35 | "The Top Hat" | Leyre Medrano | 21 January 2022 |
Fred drops his magic top hat by accident, but when Pocoyo and Pato jump inside, they are transported to multiple dimensions.
| 245 | 36 | "The Universe-Changing Remote" | Leyre Medrano & Tatiana Chisleanschi | 25 February 2022 |
Pocoyo and Pato find a remote that alters the laws of the universe, but when they find out it belongs to Angry Alien, mayhem arises and the remote breaks to pieces.
| 246 | 37 | "The Bee" | Tatiana Chisleanschi | 18 March 2022 |
When Pocoyo, Pato, and Elly encounter a yellow bee, the frightened trio run away, prompting the bee to start chasing them. Note: This episode was produced by Pocoyo 2022 AIE.
| 247 | 38 | "What is a Cow?" | Leyre Medrano & Tatiana Chisleanschi | 22 April 2022 |
When Pocoyo, Pato, and Elly find a lonely chick that has lost its cow friend, they volunteer to help, just as soon as they learn what a cow is.
| 248 | 39 | "All Aboard the Train" | Leyre Medrano & Tatiana Chisleanschi | 27 May 2022 |
Pocoyo becomes a conductor and leads his friends on a fun train ride with various escapades.
| 249 | 40 | "Fireman Pato" | Tatiana Chisleanschi & Carlos Bleycher | 17 June 2022 |
Pato becomes a firefighter, but after he rescues Loula, all the confidence goes to his head, and ends up failing his missions. Note: This episode was produced by Pocoyo 2022 AIE.
| 250 | 41 | "A Viking Adventure" | Leyre Medrano & Tatiana Chisleanschi | 8 July 2022 |
Pocoyo, Pato, and Elly become vikings to face the Red Kraken (Fred), while going on daring adventures to save each other.
| 251 | 42 | "The Juices" | Carlos Bleycher | 12 August 2022 |
Elly hires Pocoyo and Pato to help her make purple juice for her friends, but the boys end up serving different colours of juice instead, angering her. Note: This episode was produced by Pocoyo 2022 AIE.
| 252 | 43 | "The Unicorn" | Tatiana Chisleanschi | 23 September 2022 |
When her friends don't believe that unicorns exist, Nina sets out to prove them wrong and find one, but ends up unsuccessful. Note: This episode was produced by Pocoyo 2022 AIE.
Pocoyo 2022 AIE
| 253 | 44 | "The Goblin's Mask" | Dan Wicksman & Nuria Wicksman | 7 October 2022 |
After a night's worth of trick-or-treating, Pocoyo and his friends return home but Nina has a Halloween goblin mask who possesses her and wreaks havoc in Pocoyo World.
| 254 | 45 | "Elly's Auntie Phantie" | Dan Wicksman & Nuria Wicksman | 14 October 2022 |
Elly has made an altar to honor her deceased aunt Phantie, but Pocoyo and his friends steal the offerings for the altar, angering Elly until she learns that, technically, they were helping all along.
| 255 | 46 | "Christmas Stakeout" | Dan Wicksman & Nuria Wicksman | 7 December 2022 |
Pocoyo, Nina, and Pato are trying to figure out who brings the Christmas presents. Pocoyo thinks Santa Claus brings the presents, Nina thinks the Three Wise Men and their camels give the presents, and Pato thinks the "Giant Gift-Giver Robot" delivers them. The trio set up traps to catch their suspects.
| 256 | 47 | "The Big Little Race" | Carlos Bleycher | 3 March 2023 |
Pocoyo, Pato, and Elly have a car race, but when Angry Alien joins them, he uses his shrinking ray to diminish the three in order to win the race. Despite this, the trio refuse to give up and try to beat him.
| 257 | 48 | "Egg-cellent Friends" | Dan Wicksman & Nuria Wicksman | 31 March 2023 |
While searching for Easter eggs, Pocoyo and Pato discover a huge slide that turns the latter and later Elly into eggs. Pocoyo tries to figure out how to turn them back to normal.
| 258 | 49 | "Pocoyo's Farm" | Dan Wicksman & Nuria Wicksman | 14 April 2023 |
Pocoyo and his friends work at the farm, but chaos ensues when Nina steals Pocoyo's chick charmer (mistaking it for a trumpet, even though it looks like one) and all the chicks follow her while creating a mess at the farm.
| 259 | 50 | "A Surprising Birthday" | Leyre Medrano | 28 April 2023 |
It's Pocoyo's birthday but Pato, Elly, and Nina argue over whose birthday present is better. Pato gets him his favourite cake, Elly gets him a surprising gift, and Nina gets him a trampoline.
| 260 | 51 | "Another Key?!" | Dan Wicksman & Nuria Wicksman | 12 May 2023 |
While at the beach, Nina finds a key and she and Pocoyo go on another hunt to unlock treasure with it, while interrupting their friends. Note: This episode is a direct sequel to the series 1 episode "The Key to it All".
| 261 | 52 | "King Yeti" | Carlos Bleycher | 16 June 2023 |
Angry Alien builds a helmet that turns anyone into monsters and uses it on Yanko, turning him into a King Kong-like monster to destroy Pocoyo World. This forces Pocoyo and the League of Extraordinary Super Friends to stop him. Note: This episode is a direct sequel to the 2018 feature film Pocoyo and the League of Extraordinary Super Friends.
| 262 | 53 | "The Mystery of the Missing Pato" | Leyre Medrano | 17 July 2023 |
When Pato goes missing while playing blocks with Pocoyo, he and Elly find a key that leads to multiple different locations where they must find Pato, piece by piece. Notes: This episode is another direct sequel to the series 1 episode "The Key to it All". This episode was produced by Pocoyo 2023 AIE.
| 263 | 54 | "Pocoyo the Policeman" | Carlos Bleycher | 11 August 2023 |
Pocoyo becomes a police officer, inspired by his favourite comic book, and tries to stop any crimes, but takes the job too seriously.
| 264 | 55 | "What Will You Be When You Grow Up?" | Leyre Medrano | 10 February 2025 (Note: This episode was first released on Facebook on 13 September 2023 in Spanish. It was later released on YouTube on 29 December 2023, still in Spanish.) |
Pocoyo and his friends showcase who they want to be when they grow up, but Caterpillar wants to be a banana, which is not a profession.
Pocoyo 2023 AIE
| 265 | 56 | "The Missing Colors" | Jorge Riera | 24 May 2024 |
When Pocoyo, Pato, and Elly discover a population of sentient white-coloured eggs that steal all the colour in Pocoyo World, including theirs, they come up with a plan to retrieve them.
| 266 | 57 | "Learning to Swim" | Javier Chavanel | 26 August 2024 |
Pocoyo, Pato, and Elly teach Yanko how to swim in the pool, though their teaching disturbs Fred.
| 267 | 58 | "Patochristmas" | Javier Chavanel | 23 December 2024 (Note: This episode was first released on Kidoodle.TV sometime before October 2024.) |
Pocoyo and Pato once again have an argument during the holidays, leading Pato to spend Christmas with Yanko. However, the two later became miserable.
| 268 | 59 | "Monster's Soup" | Leyre Medrano | 2 February 2025 (Note: This episode first released on ITVX in the United Kingdom on 10 October 2024. The episode was later released on YouTube on 25 October 2024, albeit in Spanish as it was uploaded by the Pocoyo alt channel.) (via livestream) |
Elly makes a special soup, but when she spills it on Pocoyo's toys by accident, it creates a toy monster that chases both of them along with Pato. However, the monster has a friendly personality than what they expected. Note: This episode was produced by Pocoyo 2022 AIE.
| 269 | 60 | "An Unexpected Spell" | Carlos Bleycher | 21 October 2024 |
Elly performs a magic trick on Pocoyo and Pato causing them to disappear where they end up in a dimension of doors. While they have fun trick-or-treating in each door, Elly ventures to the dimension to save the boys.

=== Series 5 (2024–2025) ===
| No. overall | No. in series | Title | Written by | Original release date |
|---|---|---|---|---|
Part A
| 270 | 1 | "Shiny!" | Dan Wicksman & Nuria Wicksman | 22 July 2024 |
The Narrator thinks that robots will invade Pocoyo World, but when a later convinced Pocoyo and Pato discover a green hovering shine, they chase it down.
| 271 | 2 | "Trumpet Solo" | Javier Chavanel | 22 July 2024 |
Pocoyo comes across a magic trumpet and when he blows it, strange shapes come out of it. The shapes later form into a giant musical monster that eats everything in sight.
| 272 | 3 | "Pachyderm Cake" | Carlos Bleycher | 22 July 2024 |
Elly sets out to make her famous Pachyderm Cake to win first place at a contest like every year, but when Pocoyo volunteers to help, he blunders the recipe.
| 273 | 4 | "Pato in Pieces" | Jorge Riera | 22 July 2024 |
Pato learns that his ability to break into pieces is really helpful at times for his friends, but he gives away too many of his pieces.
| 274 | 5 | "The King of Ping-Pong" | Dan Wicksman & Nuria Wicksman | 22 July 2024 |
Pocoyo plays a match of ping-pong against the undefeated champion Fred, but he keeps on losing. However, he doesn't give up and his perseverance to win lands him closer than he's ever been.
| 275 | 6 | "Ant Buddies" | Jorge Riera | 22 July 2024 |
When Pocoyo helps an ant cross a river, the entire anthill wants to repay his debt, but he later turns the ants into his slaves.
| 276 | 7 | "The Change-Up" | Javier Chavanel | 22 July 2024 |
Sick and tired of being ignored by the boys, the Narrator quits and is replaced by a Sergeant-themed strict narrator who bosses Pocoyo and Pato around.
| 277 | 8 | "Pincers!" | Carlos Bleycher | 22 July 2024 |
On a relaxing day at the beach, Pocoyo and Pato come across a small crab that annoys them, so they chase after it.
| 278 | 9 | "Elly's Dance" | Jorge Riera | 22 July 2024 |
Elly sets up an audition to find a dance partner to dance with her at the theatre, but can't decide who to pick.
| 279 | 10 | "Pocoyo's Moustache" | Dan Wicksman & Nuria Wicksman | 22 July 2024 |
When Pocoyo wakes up to find a strand of hair on top of his mouth, he thinks he's growing a moustache and starts acting like an adult, but is unable to play with his friends due to his "mature" age.
| 280 | 11 | "My Turn!" | Javier Chavanel | 22 July 2024 |
Pocoyo and Pato play numerous games together, but Pato can't seem to get his turn as Pocoyo keeps switching off to a new game after his turn.
| 281 | 12 | "Sticky Giggles" | Carlos Bleycher | 22 July 2024 |
After he sees Loula chase her tail and thinks it's funny, Pocoyo can't seem to stop laughing, annoying his friends.
| 282 | 13 | "The Pato Doll" | Jorge Riera | 22 July 2024 |
Pato makes a doll that looks just like him, but when Pocoyo steals and plays with it, everything he does with the doll happen to Pato too.
Part B
| 283 | 14 | "Detective Pato" | Dan Wicksman & Nuria Wicksman | 30 September 2024 |
Pato becomes a detective, along with his assistant Pocoyo, to search for Elly's missing cake.
| 284 | 15 | "Pocoyo the Veterinarian" | Carlos Bleycher | 30 September 2024 |
Inspired by Elly, Pocoyo steals her equipment and becomes a veterinarian but ends up aiding helpless people.
| 285 | 16 | "Hula Hoop" | Carlos Bleycher | 30 September 2024 |
Pato impresses his friends with his cool hula-hoop tricks but later becomes obsessed with it and refuses to stop.
| 286 | 17 | "A Bad Day" | Jorge Riera | 30 September 2024 |
When Pocoyo and Pato's outing is postponed due to the rain, they try and fail to endure in indoor activities.
| 287 | 18 | "Crumbs" | Javier Chavanel | 30 September 2024 |
When a single crumb from Pocoyo's cookie remains, Baby Bird and Caterpillar fight for it.
| 288 | 19 | "Little Lost Beak" | Javier Chavanel | 30 September 2024 |
Pato lends his detachable beak to Pocoyo for a cool trick but when he loses it, he helps Pato find an alternative.
| 289 | 20 | "What Luck!" | Carlos Bleycher | 30 September 2024 |
Pocoyo comes across a four-leaf clover, thinking it's good luck, but when he rubs it in on Pato, the latter finds a lucky horseshoe and competes with Pocoyo on who gets better luck.
Part C
| 290 | 21 | "Fame" | Dan Wicksman & Nuria Wicksman | 14 October 2024 |
Pato does a funny dance after an accident on his skateboard, but when Pocoyo loves it and tells everyone, they all want Pato to do the dance over and over again, tiring him out.
| 291 | 22 | "Walk This Way" | Carlos Bleycher | 14 October 2024 |
When Pocoyo invents a new walk, his inspired friends make up their own new walk, annoying Pocoyo when their walks destroy his toys.
| 292 | 23 | "Echo" | Jorge Riera | 14 October 2024 |
Pocoyo discovers that whatever he says, his echo says the opposite, but when he shows Pato and Elly, the shy echo acts normal.
| 293 | 24 | "Achoo!" | Dan Wicksman & Nuria Wicksman | 14 October 2024 |
When the Narrator comes down with a disease known as "Narrator-itis", Pocoyo, Pato, and Elly try to come up with a cure but every medicine smoothie they give him comes with a crazy side effect.
| 294 | 25 | "Who's in the Box" | Dan Wicksman & Nuria Wicksman | 14 October 2024 |
Pocoyo discovers a magic box that shrinks anyone who hops inside it, but when he and Pato go inside, they have trouble finding a way out.
| 295 | 26 | "Hot Mess" | Dan Wicksman & Nuria Wicksman | 14 October 2024 |
Pato and Elly have had it with Pocoyo and Baby Bird's messy toys in the way, until they find a invisibility remote to "clean up" their toys.
Part D
| 296 | 27 | "Here's Bea" | Guillermo García Carsí & Giles Pilbrow | 14 July 2025 |
Bea, Pocoyo's little sister arrives in Pocoyo World, but the latter gets jealous that she's getting all the attention.
| 297 | 28 | "Let It Roll" | Guillermo García Carsí & Giles Pilbrow | 14 July 2025 |
| 298 | 29 | "Let It Roll" | Guillermo García Carsí & Giles Pilbrow | 14 July 2025 |
Pato is excited to try out Pocoyo's new trampoline but throws Bea's ball on a treetop to get her out of his hair. When he is forced to retrieve it, his peaceful fun turns into a rescue mission when Pocoyo is taken away by a giant.
| 299 | 30 | "Narrator the Almighty" | Guillermo García Carsí & Giles Pilbrow | 14 July 2025 |
| 300 | 31 | "Narrator the Almighty" | Guillermo García Carsí & Giles Pilbrow | 14 July 2025 |
While Pocoyo and Bea are on vacation, Pato decides to stay home, but the Narrator has other ideas. He fantasies exciting adventures that star and tire Pato out.
| 301 | 32 | "The Forgiven" | Guillermo García Carsí & Amy K. Rogers | 14 July 2025 |
| 302 | 33 | "The Forgiven" | Guillermo García Carsí & Amy K. Rogers | 14 July 2025 |
Elly is directing a Western movie and Pocoyo plays the leading role. However, he gloats about his new position which ruins the movie entirely.
| 303 | 34 | "What a Blast!" | Guillermo García Carsí & Giles Pilbrow | 14 July 2025 |
Pocoyo and Bea meet a mischievous tornado that bothers them. When they try to get it to go away, they end up hurting its feelings which causes a huge natural disaster.
| 304 | 35 | "Duck Call" | Guillermo García Carsí & Amy K. Rogers | 14 July 2025 |
Pocoyo leaves Pato to babysit Bea while he's away, but when he is too glued to his phone to notice, Bea tries everything to get his attention.
| 305 | 36 | "The Wild Pato" | Guillermo García Carsí & Giles Pilbrow | 14 July 2025 |
The Narrator voice-overs a documentary about "real" ducks, but when Pato learns that he's not a normal duck like them, he tries to act just like them.
Part E
| 306 | 37 | "Mirror Mirror" | Guillermo García Carsí & Giles Pilbrow | 27 October 2025 (Note: This episode was first released on ITVX on 14 August 2025.) |
When Pocoyo and Bea accidentally break Pato's mirror, they pretend to be his reflection to stop him from finding out.
| 307 | 38 | "Priszilla" | Guillermo García Carsí & Amy K. Rogers | 27 October 2025 |
| 308 | 39 | "Priszilla" | Guillermo García Carsí & Amy K. Rogers | 27 October 2025 |
A sea monster named Priszilla visits Pocoyo World, destined to destroy a city and battle a robot. When Pocoyo and Pato build a mech named Pocoböt, they use it for anything but fighting Priszilla.
| 309 | 40 | "A Brush with Aliens" | Guillermo García Carsí & Giles Pilbrow | 27 October 2025 |
When an evil alien king is bothered by Pocoyo and Bea's love for each other, he challenges them to a painting competition to get them to fight.
| 310 | 41 | "You're It" | Guillermo García Carsí & Amy K. Rogers | 27 October 2025 |
When Bea accidentally releases a tough character from a video game named Rudo, Pocoyo and friends try to teach him how to play without fighting.
| 311 | 42 | "Vinyl Love" | Guillermo García Carsí & Amy K. Rogers | 27 October 2025 |
| 312 | 43 | "Vinyl Love" | Guillermo García Carsí & Amy K. Rogers | 27 October 2025 |
Bea decides to enter a DJ competition, but doubts her beats are anywhere as good as the others.
| 313 | 44 | "Pocoyo Rocks" | Guillermo García Carsí & Giles Pilbrow | 27 October 2025 |
When Pocoyo and his friends start a band, Bea becomes the star of the show and wins everyone over, much to Pocoyo's annoyance.
| 314 | 45 | "Pulporotti" | Guillermo García Carsí & Amy K. Rogers | 27 October 2025 |
Pato tries to prove that Pulpo has an amazing opera voice, but no one believes him when the latter acts like a clown.
| 315 | 46 | "Bad Bunny" | Guillermo García Carsí & Ben Ward | 27 October 2025 |
| 316 | 47 | "Bad Bunny" | Guillermo García Carsí & Ben Ward | 27 October 2025 |
When Pocoyo and his friends' picnic basket disappears, the gang search for it and meet a mischievous bunny who loves scaring them. Pocoyo tries to get back at the bunny but finds it difficult.
| 317 | 48 | "Big Bea" | Guillermo García Carsí & Giles Pilbrow | 27 October 2025 |
| 318 | 49 | "Big Bea" | Guillermo García Carsí & Giles Pilbrow | 27 October 2025 |
When Pocoyo and Pato exclude Bea in their games because she's too small, she magically becomes big and is able to do anything. Despite this, she's now too big to play with anyone.
| 319 | 50 | "Pato in the Sky" | Guillermo García Carsí & Amy K. Rogers | 27 October 2025 |
| 320 | 51 | "Pato in the Sky" | Guillermo García Carsí & Amy K. Rogers | 27 October 2025 |
When Pato wants to prove he's the smartest of the gang, he builds a rocket to fly to space and search for an intellectual being. When he makes a new alien friend, he realizes that being the smartest doesn't have all its plus sides.
| 321 | 52 | "Pocoyo Rolls" | Guillermo García Carsí & Giles Pilbrow | 27 October 2025 |
When Bea wants to learn how to roller skate, Pocoyo is forced to teach her.

=== Series 6 (2026) ===
| No. overall | No. in series | Title | Written by | Original release date |
|---|---|---|---|---|
| 322 | 1 | "Pocoyo's House" | Guillermo García Carsí & Giles Pilbrow | 26 June 2026 (Note: This episode was first released on YouTube on 26 June 2026.) |
Pocoyo and his friends comes across unique empty boxes and gets creative by decorating them into rooms.
| 323 | 2 | "Classic Pocoyo" | Guillermo García Carsí & Elena Gobernado | 28 September 2026 (Note: The first half of the sixth season was first released on HBO Max on September 28, 2026.) |
Pocoyo plays with a magic pump, shrinks himself, and must find a way back to normal.
| 324 | 3 | "Pocoyo's Musical Round" | Guillermo García Carsí & Giles Pilbrow | 28 September 2026 |
Elly teaches Pocoyo piano, and he invents his own way of playing, full of emotion.
| 325 | 4 | "Metal Heart" | Guillermo García Carsí & Elena Gobernado | 28 September 2026 |
Priszilla and Giant mock Pocobot, but they realize he has feelings too.
| 326 | 5 | "Zzzen Master" | Guillermo García Carsí & Giles Pilbrow | 28 September 2026 |
At a sleepover, Pocoyo refuses to sleep and turns the night into chaos.
| 327 | 6 | "Saving Bea" | Guillermo García Carsí & Elena Gobernado | 28 September 2026 |
Pocoyo becomes overprotective of Bea, but he learns she needs to explore.
| 328 | 7 | "Bea Alone" | Guillermo García Carsí & Giles Pilbrow | 28 September 2026 |
Left home alone, Bea bravely defends her toys against Lord Ni.
| 329 | 8 | "Interior Designer" | Guillermo García Carsí & Elena Gobernado | 28 September 2026 |
Lord Ni redecorates the house into chaos, and Pocoyo turns it into a fun haunted house.
| 330 | 9 | "Flower Power" | Guillermo García Carsí & Giles Pilbrow | 28 September 2026 |
Pocoyo crushes Pato's flower and travels through space to find an identical one.
| 331 | 10 | "Bea and Colin" | Guillermo García Carsí & Elena Gobernado | 28 September 2026 |
Lord Ni bans music, but one of his servants, Colin, falls for Bea's songs in secret.
| 332 | 11 | "Fast Forward" | Guillermo García Carsí & Elena Gobernado | 7 November 2026 |
Pocoyo and Pato are playing basketball when something strange happens: Pocoyo begins moving back and forth uncontrollably, leading Pato to think that he is making fun of him.
| 333 | 12 | "Hide and Seek" | Guillermo García Carsí & Elena Gobernado | 7 November 2026 |
Pocoyo and Bea play hide-and-seek by transforming themselves into objects. Pato joins in, but when it’s his turn to hide, his friends get distracted by another activity and end up forgetting to look for him.
| 334 | 13 | "Do Not Touch" | Guillermo García Carsí & Elena Gobernado | 7 November 2026 |
While inspecting the features of the house, Pato warns Pocoyo not to press the big red button. however, he can't resist and presses it, making the house fly into space. Note: This episode has a similar title to the series 1 episode "Don’t Touch".
| 335 | 14 | "Pato is Sick" | Guillermo García Carsí & Elena Gobernado | 7 November 2026 |
Pato falls ill in the middle of a soccer match. Elly insists that he needs to rest, but Pocoyo cannot sit still and wait, so he tries to convince his friend to return to the game.
| 336 | 15 | "Yoyo's Yoyo" | Guillermo García Carsí & Elena Gobernado | 7 November 2026 |
When Pocoyo’s beloved yo-yo mysteriously disappears, he decides to launch a very serious "investigation" to find out who is to blame for its vanishing.
| 337 | 16 | "No Bad Ideas" | Guillermo García Carsí & Elena Gobernado | 7 November 2026 |
Pocoyo discovers that Lord Ni has gathered his henchmen to "brainstorm" (hold an idea-generating session) on how to plot against him and his friends.
| 338 | 17 | "All News Guess What" | Guillermo García Carsí & Elena Gobernado | 7 November 2026 |
Pocoyo challenges the Narrator to his favorite game, "Guess What!" However, when Lord Ni claims that the game is too easy, he decides to join in and makes a risky bet.
| 339 | 18 | "Dance Fever" | Guillermo García Carsí & Elena Gobernado | 7 November 2026 |
Pocoyo’s frisbee goes missing in Bea’s messy music room. Everyone tries to convince her to tidy up the place, but every time someone hears her catchy music, they end up dancing and just can’t stop.
| 340 | 19 | "Beep Beep Woof Woof" | Guillermo García Carsí & Elena Gobernado | 7 November 2026 |
While cleaning the Vamoosh, Pocoyo discovers a mysterious button and decides to press it, even though he had promised not to touch anything strange.
| 341 | 20 | "Funny Bunny" | Guillermo García Carsí & Elena Gobernado | 7 November 2026 |
When the Rabbit tries to become Pocoyo’s new best friend, Pato becomes convinced that the cute little bunny cannot be trusted.

== Specials/Films ==
=== Specials/Compilations (2008–2016) ===
| Title | Directed by | Original release date |
|---|---|---|
| "El Show de Pocoyo" "Pocoyo's Show" | Alfonso Rodríguez & Giu Camblor | 21 December 2008 |
To celebrate Pocoyo's first time on the big screen (The Space Circus), Pocoyo and his friends host a show with many surprises in store. To spice it up a little, Pocoyo and his friends read votes for the best Pocoyo episode, titled "The Favorite of the Favorites", and play that episode. Note: This special does not have an existing English dub. The Favorite of the Favorites: "Talent Show" - Nominated; "The Messy Guest" - Won; "Dance Off!" - Nominated
| "Pocoyo's Big Party" | Alfonso Rodríguez & Giu Camblor | 27 August 2009 |
Pocoyo and his friends celebrate by playing all day long with songs, games, and many more. Songs featured: Party!; Pato's Song; The Big Race; Elly's Doll; Elly's Birthday; Martzianyan Brot Tzirko Kantiko; Fred's Song; Go to Bed; Welcome to the World of Pocoyo
| "Spooky Movies" | Alfonso Rodríguez | 10 October 2014 |
Pocoyo and his friends celebrate Halloween by watching spooky and scary-themed episodes of Pocoyo. Episodes featured: "Invisible Pocoyo"; "Poczilla"; "Monster Mystery"
| "Carnival Special" | Alfonso Rodríguez | 11 February 2015 |
Elly teaches Pocoyo and Pato about Carnival, and the three learn about its traditional dances, costumes, and festivities through Carnival-themed episodes of Pocoyo. Episodes featured: "Pocoyo Dance"; "Wackily Ever After"; "A Surprise for Pocoyo"
| "Pocoyo & Cars" | Rubén Garcia | 3 July 2015 |
Pocoyo prepares for a huge race between his friends, whilst watching racing-themed episodes of Pocoyo. Episodes featured: "The Great Race"; "Ready, Steady, Go!"; "The Big Race" (song from "Pocoyo's Big Party")
| "Space Halloween" | Alfonso Rodríguez | 24 October 2015 |
Pocoyo, Pato, and Elly visit outer space to compete in a costume contest with Green Alien, Strange Alien, and Angry Alien, while watching space-themed episodes of Pocoyo. Episodes featured: "Lost in Space"; "Scary Noises"; "Angry Alien"; "Martzianyan Brot Tzirko Kantiko" (song from "Pocoyo's Big Party"); "Space Mission"
| "Pocoyo Sports" | Alfonso Rodríguez | 5 August 2016 |
Pocoyo World prepares for the Pocoyo Games, a sporting event where Pocoyo and his friends compete in a series of sports, while watching sports-themed episodes of Pocoyo. Episodes featured: "Bat and Ball"; "Pocoyo Gets It Right"; "Pocoyolympics"

=== Films (2008–2018) ===
Pocoyo & the Space Circus was released at Cine Captiol on 23 November 2008 as part of a charity. It later premiered on La 1 on 21 December 2008, during the stand-alone special El Show de Pocoyo. It was announced for international distribution by Zinkia and ITV Global Entertainment in March 2009. Pocoyo in Cinemas: Your First Movie released in Mexican cinemas on 11 May 2018 and Spain cinemas on 23 June 2018.

| Title | Directed by | Written by | Original release date |
|---|---|---|---|
| "Pocoyo & the Space Circus" | Alfonso Rodríguez | Ken Scarborough & Raye Lankford | 23 November 2008 |
Pocoyo and his friends meet the Martian Brothers, a quintet of acrobatic round-shaped martians who open a circus thanks to their enlarging "space zapper". However, when Pocoyo's friends mess around with the zapper, shrinking the Martian Brothers, Pocoyo takes over the circus to entertain a crowd of Angry Aliens.
| "Pocoyo and the League of Extraordinary Super Friends" "Pocoyo in Cinemas: Your First Movie" (Note: The title card for the film is entitled, Pocoyo in Theatres: Your First Movie.) | Alfonso Rodríguez | Alfonso Rodríguez | 11 May 2018 |
When Angry Alien attacks the city of Pocoyo World with his huge death robot, Pocoyo and his friends, Pato, Elly (her doll), Nina, and Roberto form a superhero team known as Pocoyo & the League of Extraordinary Super Friends to stop him.

==== Untitled third feature film (2028) ====
A third feature film of Pocoyo was confirmed to release in 2028.
