= David Jackson (musician) =

English progressive rock musician

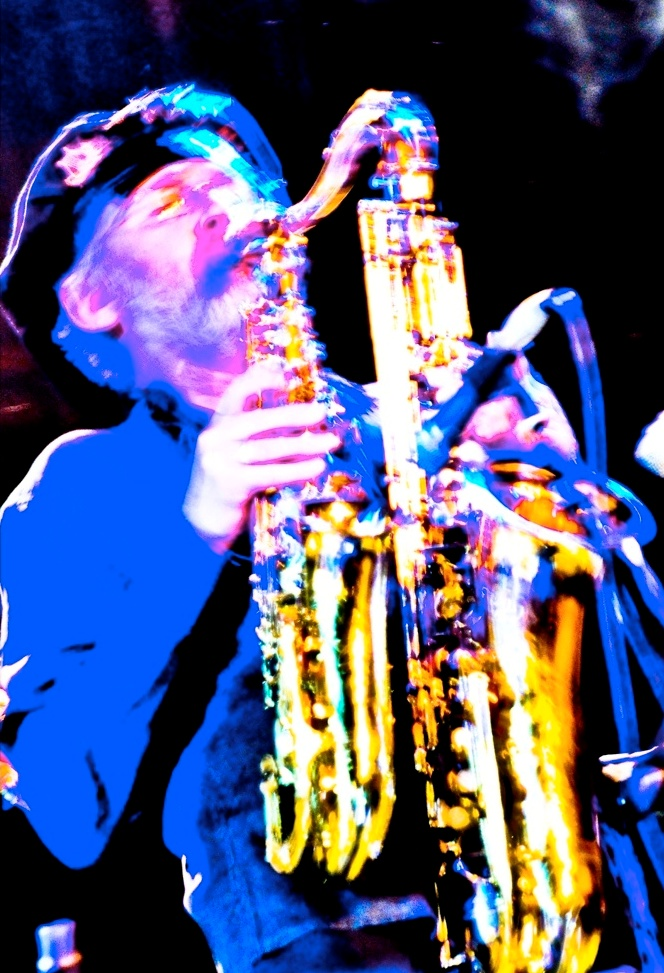

Background information
- Also known as: Jaxon
- Born: David Nicholas George Jackson; 15 April 1947 (age 78); Stamford, Lincolnshire, England
- Genres: Progressive rock; jazz fusion
- Occupations: Musician; songwriter
- Instruments: Saxophone; flute; keyboards
- Years active: 1969–present
- Member of: Kaprekar's Constant
- Formerly of: Van der Graaf Generator; David Cross Band
- Website: jaxontonewall.com

David Nicholas George Jackson (born 15 April 1947), nicknamed Jaxon, is an English progressive rock saxophonist, flautist, and composer. He is best known for his work with the band Van der Graaf Generator and his work in Music and Disability. He has also worked with Peter Gabriel, Keith Tippett, Osanna, Judge Smith, David Cross and others.

His playing is characterized by the frequent use of double horns, wielding two saxophones at the same time, a style he emulates from Rahsaan Roland Kirk (whose style and technique influenced Jackson). He also plays flutes and whistles. In the NME, reviewer Jonathan Barnett called David Jackson "the Van Gogh of the saxophone – a renegade impressionist, dispensing distorted visions of the world outside from his private asylum window".

== Van der Graaf Generator ==
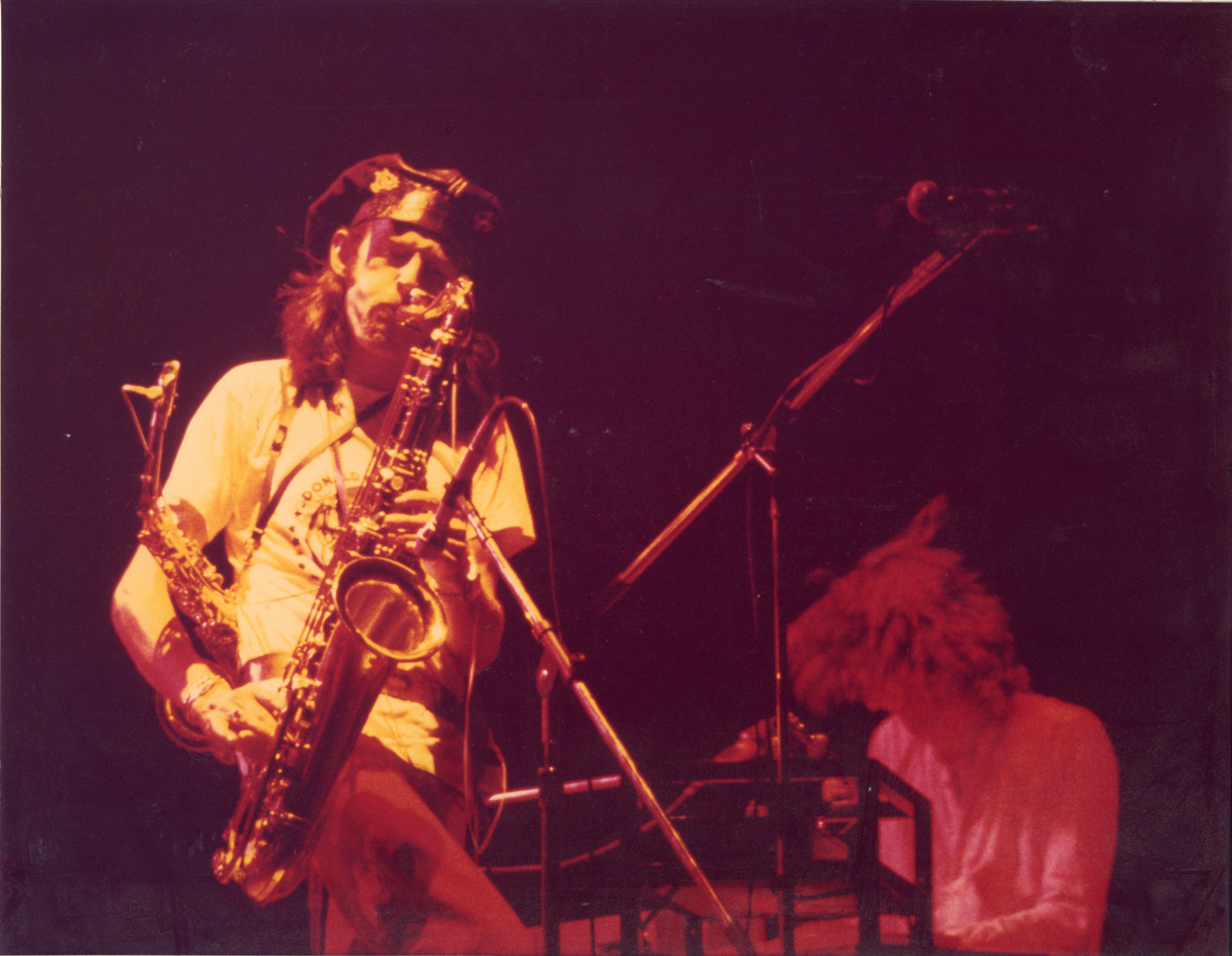
Jackson (left) and Peter Hammill performing with Van der Graaf Generator in 1976.

Jackson was a member of the English progressive rock band Van der Graaf Generator for most of the 1970s and for their 2005 reunion tour. His speciality was then electric saxophones, using octave devices, wah-wah and powerful amplification.

== Music projects ==
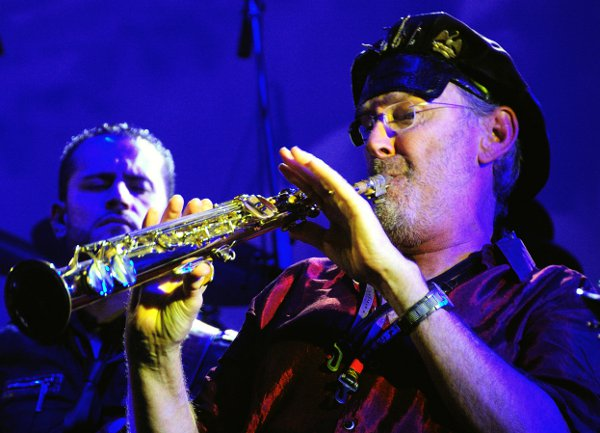
David Jackson

Jackson has collaborated with other musicians, frequently with other members of Van der Graaf Generator, as on The Long Hello project. He collaborated on a number of projects with VdGG co-founder Judge Smith, and performed with Peter Gabriel at the Reading Festival in 1979. Jackson works often with Italian rock musicians, most particularly Alex Carpani Band from Bologna and Osanna from Naples. In 2012 and 2013 he toured the European and American continents with the Alex Carpani Band.

== Education and therapeutic work ==
Jackson attended the University of St Andrews, reading psychology, and University of Surrey, Roehampton, studying teaching. He has worked as a mathematics teacher for primary school children in the UK.

He has also worked with physically and mentally disabled people, enabling them to make music through the use of a technology known as Soundbeam. He is also a Soundbeam trainer, system designer and builder. A documentary about his work with autistic children was broadcast on BBC Radio 4 in 1998.

Tonewall is the name for his idea. Apart from Soundbeams this also features Echo-Mirrors and Jellybean Eye. Jackson works together with groups of people of all levels of ability and even profound disability to create music together on stage, accompanied by musicians from diverse styles, such as orchestral and jazz musicians, Caribbean music, and much more.

== Personal life ==
David Jackson was born in Stamford, Lincolnshire. His daughter is singer Dorie Jackson, who works with Chris Difford, Francis Dunnery and William Topley among others. His son is recording engineer Jake Jackson.

A characteristic hallmark is Jackson's black leather newsboy cap with its visor that clings to his forehead decorated with several pins, which he has worn on stage for more than 50 years.

== Discography ==
=== Van der Graaf Generator ===
- The Least We Can Do Is Wave to Each Other (1970)
- H to He, Who Am the Only One (1970)
- Pawn Hearts (1971)
- Godbluff (1975)
- Still Life (1976)
- World Record (1976)
- The Quiet Zone/The Pleasure Dome (1977)
- Vital (1978)
- Time Vaults (1982)
- Maida Vale (1994)
- Present (2005)
- Real Time (2007)

=== Solo ===
- Savages (cassette) (1990)
- Hazard Dream Sequence (EP) (1991)
- Tonewall Stands (1992)
- Fractal Bridge (1996)

=== DVD ===
- Guastalla – Live Tonewall & Soundbeam (2003)

=== With Peter Hammill ===
- Fool's Mate (1971)
- Chameleon in the Shadow of the Night (1973)
- The Silent Corner and the Empty Stage (1974)
- Nadir's Big Chance (1975)
- The Future Now (1978)
- pH7 (1979)
- A Black Box (1980)
- Sitting Targets (1981)
- Enter k (1982)
- Patience (1983)
- Skin (1986)
- Out of Water (1990)
- Fireships (1992)
- The Noise (1993)
- Roaring Forties (1994)
- X My Heart (1996)
- This (1998)
- What, Now? (2001)
- Clutch (2002)
- Incoherence (2004)

=== With The Long Hello ===
- The Long Hello (Hugh Banton, Guy Evans, David Jackson; 1973)
- The Long Hello Volume Two (Nic Potter, Guy Evans; 1981)
- The Long Hello Volume Three (David Jackson, Guy Evans; 1982)
- The Long Hello Volume Four (David Jackson, Guy Evans, Life of Riley; 1983)

=== With Judge Smith ===
- DemocraZy (1991)
- The House That Cried (live choral work, premiere 28 October 1993)
- Curly's Airships (2000)
- Twinkle (stage musical, premiere 11 July 2007)
- "The Light of the World/I Don't Know What I'm Doing" (single, as The Tribal Elders, 2007)
- Orfeas (2011)

=== With Kaprekar's Constant ===
- Fate Outsmarts Desire (2017)
- Depth of Field (2019)
- The Murder Wall (2022)

=== Other collaborations ===
- Come un vecchio incensiere all'alba di un villaggio deserto (with Alan Sorrenti, 1973)
- Dinner at the Ritz (with City Boy, 1976)
- "The Night Has A Thousand Eyes" / "Something Tells Me" (single with Jakko Jakszyk, 1982)
- "Straining Our Eyes" / "Fall To Pieces" (single with Jakko Jakszyk, 1982)
- "Grab What You Can" / "Tell Me" / "Would I Be The Same" / "I'd Never Have Known" (single with Jakko Jakszyk, 1982)
- "Dangerous Dreams" / "Opening Doors" (single with Jakko Jakszyk, 1983; Stiff Records BUY 183)
- "I Can't Stand This Pressure" / "Living on the Edge" / "Cover Up" (single with Jakko Jakszyk, 1984)
- "Who's Fooling Who" / "A Grown Man Immersed in Tin-Tin" (single with Jakko Jakszyk, 1984; Stiff Records SBUY 193)
- Gentlemen Prefer Blues (Hugh Banton, Guy Evans, David Jackson) (1985)
- Sarah Jane Morris (with Sarah Jane Morris, 1988)
- Eyes of the Angel (with Magic Mushroom Band, 1989)
- Spaced Out (with Magic Mushroom Band, 1991)
- The Single (Grand Opening Song / Minutes of Peace) (cassette single with the Wildridings Primary School Choir, 1991)
- Beams & Bells: Live at the QEH (live with Treloar School & Ballard School, 2001)
- A to Z Healthy Choices (with St. John's CE (Aided) Primary School, 2003)
- Batteries Included (live with René van Commenée, 2003)
- The Music That Died Alone (with The Tangent, 2003)
- Re-Collage (with Tony Pagliuca and Massimo Donà Quintet, 2004)
- Lycanthrope (with Mangala Vallis, 2005)
- The Courting Ground (with Dorie Jackson, 2007)
- Distress Signal Code (with Lüüp, 2008)
- Prog family (with Osanna, 2008)
- Live in Italy (with Nic Potter, 2008)
- Down in Shadows (with N.y.X, 2009)
- Meadow Rituals (with Lüüp, 2011)
- Jaxon Faces the Jury (with Le Jury, 2012)
- Gridlock (with Mr Averell, 2012)
- Playing the History (with Marco Lo Muscio, John Hackett and Carlo Matteucci, 2013)
- In Hoc Signo (with Ingranaggi Della Valle, 2013)
- Live! (with ReaGente 6, 2014)
- David Cross and David Jackson: Another Day (2018)
- Ellesmere II - From Sea and Beyond (with Ellesmere, 2018)
- Fish: Weltschmerz, 2020
- Wyrd (with Ellesmere, 2020)
