= The Haunted Palace (poem) =

1839 poem written by Edgar Allan Poe

"The Haunted Palace" is a poem by Edgar Allan Poe. The 48-line poem was first released in the April 1839 issue of Nathan Brooks' American Museum magazine. It was eventually incorporated into "The Fall of the House of Usher" as a song written by Roderick Usher.

== Analysis ==
The poem serves as an allegory about a king "in the olden time long ago" who is afraid of evil forces that threaten him and his palace, foreshadowing impending doom. As part of "The Fall of the House of Usher", Poe said, "I mean to imply a mind haunted by phantoms — a disordered brain" referring to Roderick Usher.

The poem takes a marked change in tone towards the second to last stanza. After discussing the wit and wisdom of the king, and song and beauty in the kingdom:

But evil things, in robes of sorrow,
Assailed the monarch's high estate.

The house and family are destroyed and, apparently, become phantoms.

The beginning of the poem compares the structure with a human head. For example, the windows are eyes, its door representing a mouth. The exterior represents physical features while the interior represents the mind engaged in imaginative thought.

== Publication history ==
In 1845, Thomas Dunn English claimed Poe had tried to sell "The Haunted Palace" to John L. O'Sullivan of the Democratic Review but was rejected because he "found it impossible to comprehend it". It is unclear if this is true. The poem was published in the April 1839 issue of the Baltimore Museum.

== Critical reception ==
Rufus Wilmot Griswold, a known rival of Poe's, claimed that Poe had plagiarized the poem from Henry Wadsworth Longfellow's "Beleaguered City". Poe denied that charge and suggested that Longfellow had, in fact, plagiarized from him. Nevertheless, "The Haunted Palace" was one of the poems highlighted in Griswold's The Poets and Poetry of America, one of the first anthologies of American poetry in 1842. When the poem was reprinted by the New World in 1845, Charles Eames introduced it as exquisite. "We can hardly call to mind in the whole compass of American Poetry, a picture of more intense and glowing Ideality."

== Adaptations ==
In 1904, French composer Florent Schmitt wrote an étude, Le palais hanté, derived from "The Haunted Palace".

In 1963, the poem provided the title for a Roger Corman film of the same name. The actual plot of Corman's film The Haunted Palace comes almost entirely from The Case of Charles Dexter Ward, a novel by H. P. Lovecraft. By 1963, Corman had produced several highly lucrative films based on Poe's work, but Lovecraft was not at that time a well-known author; according to Corman on the DVD making-of featurette, the studio forced him to name this movie after one of Poe's poems (and included a Poe epigraph in the credits) so that audiences would believe it to be another film based on Poe's writings.

In 1987, Bulgarian rock band Shturcite released a song, "Omagiosaniyat zamuk". The song's lyrics are a translation of The Haunted Palace into Bulgarian but, in 1990, when the track was released on the compilation The Crickets, the track title was back-translated into English as "The Haunted Castle".

British musician Peter Hammill incorporated a musical setting of the poem into his opera based on the Poe short story, The Fall of the House of Usher.

In 2009, Lithuanian contemporary classical music composer Giedrius Alkauskas wrote an art song for a bass singer and a piano, based on the translation of "The Haunted Palace" into Lithuanian made by Aleksys Churginas.
