= The Long Hello Volume Two =

Studio album by David Jackson Guy Evans and Nic Potter
- Released: 1981
- Studio: Hidden Drive Studios
- Genre: Progressive rock
- Length: 34:23
- Label: Butt
- Producer: Guy Evans & Nic Potter

David Jackson Guy Evans and Nic Potter chronology
The Long Hello (1974)	The Long Hello Volume Two (1981)	The Long Hello III (1982)

Professional ratings
Review scores
Source	Rating
AllMusic	3/5 stars

The Long Hello Volume Two is a instrumental studio album by Guy Evans and Nic Potter released 1981. It was recorded and mixed at Hidden Drive Studios, Pyworthy Rectory, near Holsworthy, North Devon, England.

== Track listing ==
1. "Surfing with Isabelle" (Nic Potter) – 4:12
2. "Elsham Road" (Nic Potter) – 3:35
3. "Dolphins" (Nic Potter) – 3:56
4. "Carnival" (Nic Potter) – 2:55
5. "Broken Chain" (Nic Potter) – 2:35
6. "Hidden Drive" (Guy Evans, Nic Potter) – 2:20
7. "Indian" (Guy Evans, Nic Potter) – 4:06
8. "Zen" (Guy Evans) – 3:12
9. "Agua Blanca" (Guy Evans) – 4:13
10. "Welcombe Mouth" (Guy Evans) – 3:12
11. "Flowing River / Jam"* – 9:22
12. "Elsham Road (Live)"* – 6:29
13. "A Whiter Shade of Blue"* – 3:04
  - Tracks 11, 12 and 13 only on the 1993 Zomart Records CD reissue and recorded live in London, 1991.

== Personnel ==
- Nic Potter – bass, synthesisers, guitars
- Guy Evans – drums, percussion, bamboo too-flutes, synthesizers on "Welcombe Mouth", all instruments on "Agua Blanca"

=== Guest musicians ===
- David Jackson – saxophones, flutes on tracks (1–5,13)
- Stuart Gordon – violin on tracks (11–13)
- Huw Lloyd-Langton – guitar on tracks (11–13)
- Giles Perring – additional drums on "Hidden Drive"

=== Credits ===
- Engineered by – Guy Evans
- Assistant engineer – Nigel Mazlin-Jones
- Cover photography – Anton Corbijn
- Cover artwork – Chris Harris
