= Out of Water =

Studio album by Peter Hammill
- Released: February 1990
- Recorded: January – August 1989
- Studio: Sofa Sound, Wiltshire; Terra Incognita, Bath
- Genre: Art rock
- Length: 45:15
- Label: Enigma
- Producer: Peter Hammill, David Lord

Peter Hammill chronology
In a Foreign Town (1988)	Out of Water (1990)	Room Temperature (1990)

Professional ratings
Review scores
Source	Rating
AllMusic	2.5/5 stars
The Guardian	(favourable)
Melody Maker	(beautiful)
Sounds	(relevant)

Out of Water is the 17th studio album by Peter Hammill, originally released on Enigma Records in 1990 and subsequently re-released on Hammill's own Fie! label. Hammill himself considers this album to be a turning point from his mid-eighties style.

Two of the performers are credited by the nicknames they were given when they were part of Hammill's K Group in the 1980s: John Ellis (who also painted the picture on the cover) as "Fury" and Nic Potter as "Mozart". The song "A Way Out" is believed to be about the suicide of Hammill's brother.

"Our Oyster" references the 1989 Tiananmen square massacre.

== Track listing ==
All songs written by Peter Hammill.

1. "Evidently Goldfish" – 5:02
2. "Not the Man" – 4:24
3. "No Moon in the Water" – 4:36
4. "Our Oyster" – 5:33
5. "Something about Ysabel's Dance" – 5:32
6. "Green Fingers" – 4:35
7. "On the Surface" – 8:14
8. "A Way Out" – 7:17

== Personnel ==
- Peter Hammill – vocals, guitar, keyboards
- Stuart Gordon – violin on 5
- John Ellis – guitar on 1, 4, and 7
- David Jackson – saxophone on 3 and 6
- Nic Potter – bass on 3 and 6

=== Technical ===
- Peter Hammill – recording engineer, mixing (Sofa Sound/Terra Incognita, Bath)
- David Lord – recording engineer, mixing (Crescent Studios, Bath)
- John Ellis – cover drawing
