= Room Temperature (album) =

Live album by Peter Hammill
- Released: November 1990
- Recorded: February–March 1990
- Venue: Various concerts in the US, UK and Canada
- Genre: Art rock
- Length: 145:43
- Label: Enigma
- Producer: Peter Hammill

Peter Hammill chronology
Out of Water (1990)	Room Temperature (1990)	The Fall of the House of Usher (1991)

Professional ratings
Review scores
Source	Rating
Allmusic	2/5 stars

Room Temperature is a live album by Peter Hammill, originally released on Enigma Records in 1990. On its initial release, the album was only available in North America. It was subsequently re-released on Hammill's own Fie! label.

The album documents Hammill's 1990 tour of Europe and North America. Hammill's group for this tour consisted of Stuart Gordon on violin and former Van der Graaf Generator bassist Nic Potter on bass. There was no drummer, hence some of the songs on these recordings have a stripped down, chamber music feel. The group was briefly billed as the Peter Hammill Band.

Initial copies of this double live CD came in a longbox.

== Track listing ==
All tracks composed by Peter Hammill; except where indicated

Disc one
No.	Title	Writer(s)	Length
1.	"The Wave"		3:40
2.	"Just Good Friends"		5:16
3.	"Vision"		4:51
4.	"Time To Burn"		5:01
5.	"Four Pails"	Chris Judge Smith, Max Hutchinson	6:19
6.	"The Comet, The Course, The Tail"		9:45
7.	"Ophelia"		4:12
8.	"Happy Hour"		9:16
9.	"If I Could"		5:57
10.	"Something About Ysabel's Dance"		7:38
11.	"Patient"		10:02

Disc two
No.	Title	Writer(s)	Length
1.	"Cat's Eye / Yellow Fever (Running)"	Graham Smith, Peter Hammill	6:04
2.	"Skin"		5:31
3.	"Hemlock"		8:20
4.	"Our Oyster"		7:12
5.	"The Unconscious Life"		5:57
6.	"After The Show"		11:01
7.	"A Way Out"		8:46
8.	"The Future Now"		4:07
9.	"Traintime"		5:53
10.	"Modern"		10:52

== Personnel ==
- Peter Hammill – vocals, guitar, keyboards
- Stuart Gordon – violin
- Nic Potter – bass
