= The Long Hello =

Studio album by David Jackson Hugh Banton, Guy Evans and Nic Potter
- Released: 1974
- Recorded: August 1973
- Studios: Foel Studios, Cefn Coch, Montgomeryshire, Wales
- Genre: Progressive rock
- Length: 44:17
- Label: United Artists
- Producer: Guy Evans

David Jackson Hugh Banton, Guy Evans and Nic Potter chronology
The Long Hello (1974)	The Long Hello Volume Two (1981)

Professional ratings
Review scores
Source	Rating
Allmusic	4/5 stars

The Long Hello is a studio instrumental album by David Jackson, Hugh Banton, Guy Evans and Nic Potter recorded in August 1973 and released in Italy in 1974 (and Britain and Europe in 1976). All had been members of Van der Graaf Generator, but the band had split up in August 1972 (reformed in 1975).

In 1981 Potter and Evans released a follow-up to this album, The Long Hello Volume Two. There also is a Long Hello Volume Three (by Jackson and Evans, 1982) and Long Hello Volume Four (by Jackson, Evans and Life of Riley, 1983). The album Gentlemen Prefer Blues (by Jackson, Banton and Evans, 1985) is sometimes regarded as a sort of "Long Hello Volume Five."

The album was recorded at Foel Studios, Cefn Coch, Montgomeryshire in Wales, engineered by Banton, and was mixed at the Chalk Farm Studio, Chalk Farm in London.

== Track listing ==
1. "The Theme from (Plunge)" (David Jackson) – 5:31
2. "The O Flat Session" (Pietro Messina) – 5:32
3. "Morris to Cape Roth" (David Jackson) – 6:33
4. "Brain Seizure" (Hugh Banton) – 4:01
5. "Fairhazel Gardens" (David Jackson, Pietro Messina) – 7:56
6. "Looking at You" (David Jackson) – 6:16
7. "I've Lost My Cat" (David Jackson) – 8:28

== Personnel ==
- David Jackson – saxophones, flute, piano
- Hugh Banton – all instruments on "Brain Seizure", bass on "The O Flat Session"
- Guy Evans – drums
- Nic Potter – bass
- Ced Curtis – electric guitar, bass on "Fairhazel Gardens"
- Pietro Messina – electric guitar, acoustic guitar, piano

"Fairhazel Gardens"

"Morris to Cape Roth"

== Release history ==
Year	Type	Label	Catalog #	Country
1974	LP	United Artists	UAL 24033	Italy
1976	LP	(no Label, self issued)	LTH-100-A1	UK
1976	LP	Butt Records	NOTT 002	UK
1977	LP	Philips	9286 854	France
1993	CD	Zomart Records	ZOMCD004	UK
