= The Noise (album) =

Studio album by Peter Hammill
- Released: March 1993
- Recorded: January–September 1992
- Genre: Art rock, Pop rock
- Length: 43:11
- Label: Fie!
- Producer: Peter Hammill

Peter Hammill chronology
Fireships (1992)	The Noise (1993)	Roaring Forties (1994)

Professional ratings
Review scores
Source	Rating
Allmusic	2/5 stars

The Noise is the 20th studio album by the English singer and songwriter Peter Hammill. It was released in March 1993.

As the title implies, the album is a collection of uptempo rock songs, in sharp contrast to Hammill's previous album, Fireships, which consisted mainly of ballads. The album was announced on its sleeve as "Number 1 in the A Loud series" (Fireships had similarly been labelled as "Number 1 in the BeCalm series"). At the time, Hammill intended these labels to continue, and to separate his loud and quiet songs between different albums. The idea did not, however, continue beyond these two albums.

The song "Primo on the Parapet" is a tribute to the writer and Holocaust survivor Primo Levi, and has been performed many times by Hammill in concert.

== Track listing ==
All tracks composed by Peter Hammill

No.	Title	Length
1.	"A Kick To Kill The Kiss"	4:07
2.	"Like A Shot, The Entertainer"	5:08
3.	"The Noise"	6:09
4.	"Celebrity Kissing"	4:30
5.	"Where The Mouth Is"	5:29
6.	"The Great European Department Store"	4:54
7.	"Planet Coventry"	4:01
8.	"Primo On The Parapet"	8:53

== Personnel ==
- Peter Hammill – vocals, guitar, keyboards
- Manny Elias – drums
- Nic Potter – bass
- John Ellis – guitar
- David Jackson – saxophone, flute

=== Technical ===
- Peter Hammill – recording engineer, mixing (Terra Incognita, Bath)
- Paul Ridout – cover design
