= Maida Vale (album) =

Maida Vale: The BBC Radio One Sessions

Live album by Van der Graaf Generator
- Released: 13 June 1994
- Recorded: 1971, 1975 and 1976
- Genre: Progressive rock
- Length: 71:09
- Label: Band of Joy Records
- Producer: John Muir (tracks 1 and 2) and Tony Wilson (rest)

Van der Graaf Generator chronology
Time Vaults (1982)	Maida Vale: The BBC Radio One Sessions (1994)	Present (2005)

Professional ratings
Review scores
Source	Rating
AllMusic	3/5 stars

Maida Vale: The BBC Radio One Sessions is a compilation album by Van der Graaf Generator, containing eight songs from four different recording sessions at Maida Vale Studios for BBC Radio 1 in 1971, 1975 and 1976, three of which were Peel Sessions. It was released in June 1994 on Band of Joy Records.

All tracks were re-released on the 2015 2CD BBC compilation After the Flood: At the BBC 1968-1977, together with all the other BBC sessions, which survived in good audio quality.

The versions of "When She Comes" and "Masks" found here were also released as bonus tracks on the 2005 Charisma reissue of World Record.

== Track listing ==
All songs written by Peter Hammill, except where noted.

No.	Title	Writer(s)	Length
1.	"Darkness" (Sounds of the 70s, 10 June 1971)		7:17
2.	"Man-Erg" (Sounds of the 70s, 10 June 1971)		11:00
3.	"Scorched Earth" (John Peel Show, 3 July 1975)	Hammill, David Jackson	9:40
4.	"Sleepwalkers" (John Peel Show, 3 July 1975)		8:58
5.	"Still Life" (John Peel Show, 1 April 1976)		7:20
6.	"La Rossa" (John Peel Show, 1 April 1976)		10:00
7.	"When She Comes" (John Peel Show, 11 November 1976)		8:08
8.	"Masks" (John Peel Show, 11 November 1976)		7:22

== Personnel ==
Van der Graaf Generator

- Peter Hammill – vocals, piano, guitar and moods
- Hugh Banton – organ, bass pedals and design
- Guy Evans – drums and tiptoe
- David Jackson – saxophones, flute and his own devices
