= Roaring Forties (album) =

Studio album by Peter Hammill
- Released: 12 September 1994
- Recorded: August 1993–May 1994
- Genre: Art rock
- Length: 48:19
- Label: Fie!
- Producer: Peter Hammill

Peter Hammill chronology
The Noise (1992)	Roaring Forties (1994)	X My Heart (1996)

Professional ratings
Review scores
Source	Rating
AllMusic	4/5 stars
Classic Rock	7/10 stars

Roaring Forties is the 21st studio album by Peter Hammill, released on his own Fie! label in 1994. It, and the following album, X My Heart, are Hammill's most recent albums that primarily contain an organic, full-band rock style. While there are occasional tracks on later albums in this style, Hammill's principal mode has moved since this album towards a more intimate, chamber-music style. The Roaring Forties is a name given, especially by sailors, to the latitudes between 40°S and 50°S, so called because of the boisterous and prevailing westerly winds.

The album also contains "A Headlong Stretch", one of Hammill's occasional long, episodic song suites (see also "A Plague of Lighthouse Keepers" from Pawn Hearts and "Flight" from A Black Box).

== Track listing ==
All tracks composed by Peter Hammill

No.	Title	Length
1.	"Sharply Unclear"	5:43
2.	"The Gift Of Fire (Precursed)"	1:44
3.	"The Gift Of Fire (Talk Turkey)"	6:46
4.	"You Can't Want What You Always Get..."	5:58
5.	"...If You Haven't Got It Yet"	3:34
6.	"A Headlong Stretch" (Up Ahead)	3:30
7.	"A Headlong Stretch Continental Drift" (Continental Drift)	3:09
8.	"A Headlong Stretch" (The Twelve)	1:35
9.	"A Headlong Stretch" (Long Light)	3:01
10.	"A Headlong Stretch" (Backwards Man)	4:07
11.	"A Headlong Stretch" (As You Were)	1:59
12.	"A Headlong Stretch" (Or So I Said)	2:04
13.	"Your Tall Ship"	5:03

== Personnel ==
- Peter Hammill - guitar, piano, vocals
- Nic Potter - bass on "Sharply Unclear" and "You Can't Want What You Always Get"
- Stuart Gordon - violin
- Simon Clark - organ on "The Gift of Fire"
- David Jackson - saxophone, flute
- Manny Elias - drums, percussion

=== Technical ===
- Peter Hammill - recording engineer, mixing (Terra Incognita, Bath)
- Paul Ridout - design, photography
