= The Haunted Palace =

1963 film by Roger Corman

- Theatrical release poster by Reynold Brown
- Directed by: Roger Corman
- Screenplay by: Charles Beaumont
- Based on: "The Haunted Palace" by Edgar Allan Poe; The Case of Charles Dexter Ward by H. P. Lovecraft
- Produced by: Roger Corman
- Starring: Vincent Price; Debra Paget; Lon Chaney Jr.
- Cinematography: Floyd Crosby
- Edited by: Ronald Sinclair
- Music by: Ronald Stein
- Color process: Pathécolor
- Production company: Alta Vista Productions
- Distributed by: American International Pictures
- Release date: August 28, 1963
- Running time: 87 minutes
- Country: United States
- Language: English
- Box office: $1,200,000 (US/ Canada); 184,700 admissions (France)

The Haunted Palace is a 1963 Gothic fantasy horror film released by American International Pictures, starring Vincent Price, Lon Chaney Jr. and Debra Paget (in her final film), in a story about a village held in the grip of a dead necromancer. Directed by Roger Corman, it is one of his series of eight films derived from or inspired by the works of American author Edgar Allan Poe.

Although marketed as "Edgar Allan Poe's The Haunted Palace", the film actually derives its plot from The Case of Charles Dexter Ward, a novella by H. P. Lovecraft. The film's title is derived from a 6-stanza poem by Poe, published in 1839 (which was later incorporated into Poe's horror short story "The Fall of the House of Usher"), and the film uses eight lines from the poem within the framing of the story.

== Plot ==
In 1765, the inhabitants of Arkham, Massachusetts, are suspicious of the strange phenomena surrounding the grand "palace" that overlooks the town. They suspect the palace's owner, Joseph Curwen, is a warlock.

A young girl wanders up to the palace in a trance-like state. She is led by Curwen and his mistress, Hester, down into the dungeons. The girl is subjected to a strange ritual, in which an unseen creature rises up from a covered pit. The townspeople observe the girl wandering off, and they storm the palace to confront its owner. Though the girl appears unharmed, the townspeople surmise that she has been bewitched to forget what happened to her. They drag Curwen out to a tree where they intend to burn him. The mob leader, Ezra Weeden, insists that they do not harm Hester (to whom he had been previously engaged to marry). Before being burned alive, Curwen puts a curse on Arkham and its inhabitants and their descendants, promising to rise from the grave to take his revenge.

In 1875, 110 years later, Curwen's great-great-grandson, Charles Dexter Ward, and his wife Anne arrive in Arkham after inheriting the palace. They find the townsfolk hostile towards them and are disturbed by the horrific deformities that afflict many of Arkham's inhabitants. Charles is surprised by how well he seems to know the palace and struck by his strong resemblance to a portrait of Curwen. He and Anne meet Simon, the palace caretaker, who persuades them to stay at the palace and to forget the townspeople's hostility. Charles becomes more and more obsessed with the portrait of Curwen, and at times seems to change in his personality.

Charles and Anne befriend the local doctor, Marinus Willet. He explains the circumstances surrounding Curwen's death, and that the townspeople blame the deformities on the curse. He tells them of a black magic book, the Necronomicon, believed to have been in Curwen's possession, and which Curwen used to summon the Elder Gods Cthulhu and Yog-Sothoth. Curwen's plan was to mate mortal women with these beings in order to create a race of super-humans, which led to the deformities. The townspeople are terrified that Curwen has come back in the form of Charles to seek his revenge. Dr. Willet advises Charles and Anne to leave the town.

Charles seems to be falling under the control of something and insists that they stay in Arkham. One night, Charles is possessed by the spirit of Joseph Curwen. Curwen reunites with two other warlocks, Simon and Jabez, who also have possessed their descendants. They make plans to continue their work and resurrect Hester. Curwen's hold on Charles is limited, and he tells Simon and Jabez that Charles is fighting him.

Curwen begins his revenge on the descendants. He kills Ezra Weeden's descendant Edgar by releasing Weeden's monstrously deformed son from his locked room and attacks Micah Smith's descendant Peter with fire. Curwen takes complete control of Charles and he attempts to rape Anne. Anne seeks help from Dr. Willet, whom Curwen then attempts to persuade that Anne is insane. Curwen and his associates succeed in resurrecting Hester.

The townspeople discover Peter Smith's charred corpse and storm the palace. Dr. Willet and Anne try to rescue Charles and discover a secret entrance to the dungeons. They are ambushed by Curwen, Simon, Jabez, and Hester. Anne is offered as a mate to the creature in the pit, while the residents break in and begin to raze the palace. The portrait of Curwen is destroyed, breaking Curwen's hold over Charles. Charles releases Anne, then urges Dr. Willet to take her away from the palace. While Curwen's associates seize Charles, Dr. Willet shepherds Anne from the burning palace. He returns to rescue Charles, and finds that Simon, Jabez, and Hester have escaped and left him to die. Charles and Willet barely escape the flames. Charles and Anne fervently thank Willet for saving their lives. However, it is apparent that Joseph Curwen still inhabits Charles' body.

== Cast ==
- Vincent Price as Joseph Curwen / Charles Dexter Ward
- Debra Paget as Anne Ward
- Lon Chaney Jr. as Simon Orne (credited as Lon Chaney)
- Frank Maxwell as Priam Willet / Dr. Marinus Willet
- Leo Gordon as Ezra Weeden / Edgar Weeden
- Elisha Cook, Jr. as Micah Smith / Peter Smith (credited as Elisha Cook)
- John Dierkes as Benjamin West / Jacob West (credited as John Dierkies)
- Milton Parsons as Jabez Hutchinson
- Cathie Merchant as Hester Tillinghast
- Guy Wilkerson as Gideon Leach / Mr. Leach
- I. Stanford Jolley as Mr. Carmody the coachman (credited as Stanford Jolley)
- Barboura Morris as Edgar's wife
- Darlene Lucht as Miss Fitch
- Bruno VeSota as Bruno the bartender (credited as Bruno Ve Sota)

== Production notes ==
Producer and director Roger Corman, best known for his Poe horror film series for American International Pictures, originally envisioned the project when making The Premature Burial for Pathe. He intended to cast the stars of that film, Ray Milland and Hazel Court, along with Boris Karloff. Pathe sold its interest in The Premature Burial to AIP and the Lovecraft story would be made by Corman for that studio. Milland, Court and Karloff were replaced by Vincent Price, Debra Paget and Lon Chaney.

AIP changed the film's name, against Corman's wishes, to suggest continuity with the popular Poe series. The only connection the film has with the Poe poem are two brief quotes read by Price. The credits misspell the author of the poem as by "Edgar Allen Poe"; in Corman's other Poe films, the author's middle name is spelled correctly.

The film paired Price with Debra Paget and Lon Chaney Jr.; Paget retired from acting following completion of the film, and Chaney, famous for playing The Wolf Man, made only this one appearance in a Corman film. He had co-starred with Price in Abbott and Costello Meet Frankenstein fifteen years earlier, but they didn't share any scenes; Price's participation was a voiceover role (as The Invisible Man) and he never appeared on-screen. Chaney's role in The Haunted Palace was originally meant to be played by Boris Karloff, but Karloff had contracted an illness while making Black Sabbath in Italy.

The set for the village of Arkham was quite small, and used forced perspective to appear larger. Both the front of the palace and the underground dungeon later appeared in Corman's The Terror, which was shot on sets from other AIP films.

Francis Ford Coppola provided additional dialogue for the film.

Clips from The Haunted Palace are among the stock footage from various Corman features used for the Vincent Price film Madhouse (1974), in which Price plays a horror film actor. The clips are presented as the early work of Price's character.

This was Corman's first film to use the then new zoom lens, which created issues as more light than normal had to be used on the set.

After the 18th-century portion of the story, Vincent Price recites lines 41 through 44 of the final stanza of the eponymous poem: "And travelers, now, within that valley, through the red-litten windows see vast forms, that move fantastically to a discordant melody," and the film ends with lines 45 through 48: "...While, like a ghastly rapid river, through the pale door, a hideous throng rush out forever and laugh – But smile no more."

== Critical reaction ==
In their book Lurker in the Lobby: A Guide to the Cinema of H. P. Lovecraft, Andrew Migliore and John Strysik write: "The Haunted Palace is a seminal film for Lovecraft lovers; it is the first major motion picture to introduce [Lovecraft's] creation[s] – the Necronomicon, and those cosmic abominations Cthulhu and Yog-Sothoth – to a general audience. [Lovecraft's] obsession with the past is clearly presented, and in a heartfelt passage at the end of the film, so is his belief that mankind is a minor species adrift in a malevolent universe. The film strikes a good balance between narrative and action, and Vincent Price is, well, priceless as Ward/Curwen. The supporting cast is solid and the art direction by Daniel Haller is really quite good for such a low-budget film. Roger Corman did an admirable job as the first American feature-film director to stake out some cinematic high ground for the cosmos-crushing adaptations of [H. P. Lovecraft] to follow."

== See also ==
- The Resurrected (1991)
