= Fireships (album) =

Studio album by Peter Hammill
- Released: 16 March 1992
- Recorded: November 1990–August 1991
- Genre: Art rock
- Length: 51:52
- Label: Fie!
- Producer: Peter Hammill, David Lord

Peter Hammill chronology
The Fall of the House of Usher (1991)	Fireships (1992)	The Noise (1993)

Professional ratings
Review scores
Source	Rating
AllMusic	4.5/5 stars

Fireships is the 19th studio album by English singer and songwriter Peter Hammill. Originally released in 1992, it was the first release on Hammill's own Fie! Records label. It was reissued in remastered form in 2006.

The sleeve notes label the album "Number 1 in the BeCalm series", and its songs are generally at the gentler, more introspective end of Hammill's work. Hammill's next album, the more rocking The Noise (1993), was similarly labelled as "Number 1 in the A Loud series". Hammill decided to put the quiet and loud songs he had recently written and recorded on separate albums.

At around the same time, Virgin Records, the owners of Hammill's back catalogue on Charisma Records, were planning to issue a compilation of his earlier work. When he explained the concept of the BeCalm and A Loud series to them, they decided to issue two compilations along similar lines - The Calm (After The Storm) (containing quieter songs) and The Storm (Before The Calm) (containing more aggressive material).

Originally, Hammill planned to continue this separation between quiet and loud music on subsequent albums, but the plan was soon abandoned.

Two of the album's tracks, "I Will Find You" and "Curtains", have become staples of Hammill's live set.

At the time of the album's release, Hammill (in a rare piece of merchandising) issued a limited edition of 500 numbered prints of the cover, signed by himself and the artist, Paul Ridout. The cover comprises an almost hidden ghost-like image of Hammill’s face.

== Track listing ==
All tracks by Peter Hammill, except where noted.

No.	Title	Writer(s)	Length
1.	"I Will Find You"		4:47
2.	"Curtains"		5:50
3.	"His Best Girl"		5:06
4.	"Oasis"		5:45
5.	"Incomplete Surrender"		6:39
6.	"Fireships"		7:20
7.	"Given Time"		6:39
8.	"Reprise"	David Lord, Peter Hammill	4:19
9.	"Gaia"		5:33

== Personnel ==
- Peter Hammill - voice, guitar, keyboards
- David Lord - keyboards
- David Jackson - saxophone, flute
- Nic Potter - bass
- Stuart Gordon - violin
- John Ellis - guitar

=== Technical ===
- David Lord - recording engineer, mixing (Crescent Studios, Bath)
- Paul Ridout - artwork
