= The Quiet Zone/The Pleasure Dome =

Studio album by Van der Graaf
- Released: 2 September 1977
- Recorded: 13 May – 12 June 1977
- Studios: Foel, Morgan and Rockfield Studios
- Genre: Progressive rock
- Length: 43:34
- Labels: Charisma (UK); Mercury (USA)
- Producer: Peter Hammill

Van der Graaf chronology
World Record (1976)	The Quiet Zone/The Pleasure Dome (1977)	Vital (1978)

The Quiet Zone/The Pleasure Dome is the eighth album by British progressive rock band Van der Graaf Generator. Released in 1977, it was their last studio album before their 2005 reunion. The album features a more energetic, new wave sound than its three immediate predecessors, anticipating singer and songwriter Peter Hammill's late 1970s solo work.

For this album, bassist Nic Potter returned to the band, having left in 1970, and violinist Graham Smith (String Driven Thing) also joined the line-up, in place of the two members who had departed in the aftermath of their previous album, World Record (October 1976): organist Hugh Banton and saxophonist/flutist David Jackson. This considerably modified the band's sound. Officially, the band's name was shortened to just "Van der Graaf" for this album and the live album, Vital (July 1978), that followed, but contemporaneous Charisma Records promotional materials used both the full and shortened name.

== Reception ==
Professional ratings
Review scores
Source	Rating
AllMusic	4.5/5 stars

Critical reception was positive. Melody Maker said the band "[had] just come up with an album that finally approached the band's long-promised potential".

== Track listing ==
All songs written by Peter Hammill, except where noted.

Side one, "The Quiet Zone"
No.	Title	Length
1.	"Lizard Play"	4:29
2.	"The Habit of the Broken Heart"	4:40
3.	"The Siren Song"	6:05
4.	"Last Frame"	6:15

Side two, "The Pleasure Dome"
No.	Title	Writer(s)	Length
5.	"The Wave"		3:15
6.	"Cat's Eye / Yellow Fever (Running)"	Hammill, Graham Smith	5:21
7.	"The Sphinx in the Face"		5:59
8.	"Chemical World"		6:12
9.	"The Sphinx Returns"		1:18

2005 CD bonus tracks
No.	Title	Length
10.	"Door"	3:23
11.	"The Wave" (Demo Version)	3:14
12.	"Ship Of Fools" (B-side of "Cat's Eye" single)	3:46

== Reissue packaging issues ==
The 2005 reissue added some B-sides and a demo. The last two of these, "The Wave" and "Ship of Fools", were labelled the wrong way around on the CD packaging.

== Personnel ==
Van der Graaf

- Peter Hammill – vocals, electric and acoustic guitars, piano
- Graham Smith – violin
- Nic Potter – bass guitar
- Guy Evans – drums, percussion

as a guest musician

- David Jackson – saxophone (1, 7, 9)
- Charles Dickie - Synthesizers (bonus tracks 10, 12)
