= The Fall of the House of Usher (Hammill opera) =

Studio album by Peter Hammill
- Released: 11 November 1991
- Genre: Art rock, rock opera
- Length: 76:40
- Label: Some Bizzare/Fie! Records

Peter Hammill chronology
Room Temperature (1990)	The Fall of the House of Usher (1991)	Fireships (1992)

The Fall of the House of Usher is an opera by Peter Hammill (music) and Chris Judge Smith (libretto). It is based on the 1839 short story of the same name by Edgar Allan Poe.

== Background ==
Hammill and Smith, the two founders of Van der Graaf Generator, worked sporadically on the opera from 1973 until its first recording was released on Some Bizzare Records (the only instance of Hammill's work appearing on the label) in November 1991. The album was released on CD, cassette and a limited edition of 500 double vinyl LPs.

Smith's libretto takes certain liberties with Poe's source text. The House itself becomes a vocal part, to be sung by the same performer who sings the role of Roderick Usher. The narrator, unnamed in the story, is given the name Montresor (the name of the narrator of another tale by Poe, "The Cask of Amontillado"), and a romantic attachment between Montresor and Madeline Usher is hinted at.

In 1999, Hammill regained the rights to the music from Some Bizzare and set about revising the piece. He re-recorded some of his own vocals, although the parts of the other singers were untouched. He also removed the percussion, added more electric guitar and remixed the entire recording. The results were released as The Fall of the House of Usher (Deconstructed & Rebuilt) on Hammill's own Fie! label in November 1999. Hammill regards this version as the definitive recorded version of the opera.

The opera has never been performed live in its entirety. In the 1980s Hammill performed "The Sleeper" a capella at a Poetry reading festival in Amsterdam in October 1983, and in New York in July 1986. At live concerts in 1991 and 1992 Hammill frequently sang a suite of songs from the opera, officially released on the video/DVD In The Passionskirche.

== Reception ==
Professional ratings
Review scores
Source	Rating
Allmusic	3/5 stars

Paul Stump, in his History of Progressive Rock, commented of The Fall of the House of Usher that "what might be seen as possibly the most appropriate vessel for a Hammill chef d'oeuvre is merely seventy-five minutes of excruciating mannerism ... meandering, formless, electronic non-opera at its warbling worst."

== Track listing ==
Music composed by Peter Hammill; Libretto lyrics written by Chris Judge Smith; except where noted.

1. "An Unenviable Role" - 2:29
2. "That Must Be the House" - 4:57
3. "Architecture" - 3:40
4. "The Sleeper" (lyrics: Edgar Allan Poe) - 3:19
5. "One Thing At a Time" - 2:50
6. "I Shun the Light" - 3:46
7. "Leave This House" - 5:05
8. "Dreaming" - 3:30
9. "A Chronic Catalepsy" - 3:16
10. "The Herbalist" - 3:32
11. "The Evil That Is Done" - 3:47
12. "Five Years Ago" - 3:51
13. "It's Over Now" - 3:32
14. "An Influence" - 3:18
15. "No Rot" - 2:27
16. "She Is Dead" - 6:44
17. "Beating of the Heart" - 5:20
18. "The Haunted Palace" (lyrics: Edgar Allan Poe) - 4:22
19. "I Dared Not Speak" - 2:57
20. "She Comes Towards the Door" - 1:06
21. "The Fall" - 3:20

== Cast ==
- Peter Hammill as Roderick Usher and the House
- Lene Lovich as Madeline Usher
- Andy Bell as Montresor
- Sarah Jane Morris as the Chorus
- Herbert Grönemeyer as the Herbalist

== Personnel ==
- Peter Hammill – vocals, keyboards, guitar, percussion (removed on 1999 version)
- Stuart Gordon – violin (1999 version only)

=== Technical ===
- Peter Hammill – recording engineer, mixing (Sofa Sound/Terra Incognita, Bath)
- Les Chappell – recording engineer for parts of Lovich's performance (H.O.M.E. Studios, Norfolk)
- Christoph Matlok – recording engineer for Mr Grönemeyer's performance (Outside Studios, Oxfordshire)
- Paul Ridout – design, artwork
