= Giants (The Stranglers album) =

Studio album by The Stranglers
- Released: 5 March 2012
- Recorded: 2011–2012
- Studio: Charlton Farm Studios, Bath, UK
- Genre: Punk rock; post-punk
- Length: 43:07
- Label: Absolute (UK); Ear Music (Europe)
- Producer: Louie Nicastro; The Stranglers

The Stranglers chronology
| Suite XVI (2006) | Giants (2012) | Dark Matters (2021) |

Singles from Giants
- 1. "Mercury Rising" Released: 29 October 2012

Alternative cover
- Censored album cover

Professional ratings
Review scores
| Source | Rating |
|---|---|
| AllMusic | 3/5 stars |
| AU Magazine | 3.5/5 stars |
| BBC Music | (8/10) |
| FMV Magazine | 4.5/5 stars |
| Mojo | 4/5 stars |
| musicOMH | 4.5/5 stars |
| Q | 3/5 stars |
| The Skinny | 2/5 stars |
| ThisIsNotAScene | (9.5/10) |
| ThisIsFakeDIY | (4/10) |
| Uncut | 3/5 stars |

Giants is the seventeenth studio album by English rock band the Stranglers and continues the band's return as a four-piece after the departure of singer Paul Roberts. Lead vocals are shared between guitarist Baz Warne and bassist Jean-Jacques Burnel. The album was released on 5 March 2012 and was supported by an extensive UK tour by the band. It was their last album to feature original drummer Jet Black and the last to be released in keyboard player Dave Greenfield's lifetime.

The album continues the shift to a more recognisable sound seen in the previous album, Suite XVI, but also builds on a sound much more akin to the band's 1970s era.

The album was released in the formats of digital download, CD and vinyl, with the deluxe edition of the CD being released with an additional live acoustic disc for the same price. In an interview, Burnel stated that the album has few overdubs so that they can play all the songs live without using any "trickery". He also stated that "Time Was Once on My Side" is a single of sorts, continuing to question what makes a single in 2012.

== Release and album cover ==
The release was better promoted than previous albums with Burnel appearing on The One Show and also appearing on BBC Breakfast with Baz Warne to talk about the album. There were also 19 billboard advertisements put up around London using an alternate image to the album art. The controversial image, featuring head-shots of the four band members dead, with nooses around their necks, was banned from the London Underground and only permitted on digital billboards between 9:00 pm and 5:00 am. Showing the band hanging from swings in a children's playground, the album cover was also banned in some countries and replaced with a version showing empty nooses. Photographer David Boni declared it to be one of the best photos he'd worked on.

The band worked on the album for two years on and off between festivals, gigs and going off places. "...But some of the ideas stem back to 10 years ago. You can't always make a decent song with just one idea and we've been mulling over some ideas for quite a few years," Burnel remarked.

The bassist said he was delighted with the initial reaction to their album in the media. "This record seems to be taking off big time. We're having to go to Paris to do 50 or 60 radio shows and they've asked us to do a dozen live performances. After that we've got to go to Berlin because interest's picking up there well so this record – which hasn't come out yet – seems to be getting quite a lot of attention," he remarked prior to the release.

== Reception ==
Upon its release, the album received generally good reviews from music critics. Aggregating website AnyDecentMusic? reports a score of 6.3 based on 9 professional reviews.

== Lyrics and composition ==
The opening track on the album, the instrumental "Another Camden Afternoon", originally had lyrics inspired by an article about a fatal mugging in Camden, but the band decided to keep the track instrumental apart from some backing vocals. "Freedom Is Insane" was an idea Jean-Jacques Burnel had that was left over from the Suite XVI writing sessions in 2005. Initially, the lyrics were triggered by the Iraq War and deals with imposing western ideas of freedom, democracy and Christianity on other countries. Musically, it was originally much more melancholy without "that uptempo, Stranglers "surfari" guitar," according to Burnel. The band re-worked the song for Giants until it felt "more naturally Strangler-ish."

"Giants" is a song about captains of industry, and "Adios (Tango)" is described by Baz Warne as "heavy metal tango", sung entirely in Spanish by Burnel. "Lowlands" was inspired by the first acoustic tour the Stranglers did with former Transglobal Underground-percussionist Neil Sparkes in Holland and Belgium in 2007, and in particular "one mad night" when the band were driving back from a gig to their hotel. "We had plenty of brandy and primo Dutch weed and started to record ourselves accapella making up a song," Baz Warne wrote on the band's web site in 2012. "Dave [Greenfield] was in the front singing the keyboard parts, I was singing bass parts, JJ was singing the melody and Sparkes was keeping time on a champagne bottle with a broken drumstick ... our tour manager Gary Knighton was laughing so much he could hardly drive and was getting secondarily stoned."

"Boom Boom" is described by Warne as "a sort of Stonesy rhythm with a jangle and a bit of swagger," and "a different feel from anything the band has done before." The bass riff for "My Fickle Resolve" had been around since 2004's Norfolk Coast album, but Burnel couldn't find "what to hang it on," until Warne found "something which really made sense," Burnel said. The band tried to keep the track as stripped back as possible, using acoustic guitars and bass, brushes on the drums, and Feline-esque keyboards.

Warne has described "Mercury Rising" as "wacky", and as a track where he's doing his best Captain Beefheart impression vocally and on slide guitar. The track also reminded him the most of mid 1980's period Stranglers. The band worked on the album at Charlton Farm near Bath, which housed their recording studio and accommodations, "preparing, sifting, rejecting and writing," as Warne described it. "On these occasions when I went upstairs to bed I found myself counting the number of steps to the landing, and there were 15," he said. "15 steps to heaven and the salvation of my room. This song ["15 Steps"] is purely about the wonderful old house we lived in writing this album, and some of the things that occurred there."

== Track listing ==
All tracks are written by Jet Black, Jean-Jacques Burnel, Dave Greenfield and Baz Warne, except where noted.

Standard edition
| No. | Title | Length |
|---|---|---|
| 1. | "Another Camden Afternoon" | 4:05 |
| 2. | "Freedom Is Insane" | 6:20 |
| 3. | "Giants" | 3:44 |
| 4. | "Lowlands" | 3:16 |
| 5. | "Boom Boom" | 3:24 |
| 6. | "My Fickle Resolve" | 5:34 |
| 7. | "Time Was Once on My Side" | 3:33 |
| 8. | "Mercury Rising" | 3:39 |
| 9. | "Adios (Tango)" | 4:41 |
| 10. | "15 Steps" | 4:58 |
| Total length: | | 43:07 |

Deluxe edition
Disc 1

- as per standard edition

Disc 2 – Acoustic set convention 2011 live
| No. | Title | Writer(s) | Length |
|---|---|---|---|
| 1. | "Tits" | Black, Burnel, Hugh Cornwell, Greenfield | 5:50 |
| 2. | "English Towns" | Black, Burnel, Cornwell, Greenfield | 2:58 |
| 3. | "Southern Mountains" | Black, Burnel, John Ellis, Greenfield, Paul Roberts | 3:33 |
| 4. | "European Female" | Black, Burnel, Cornwell, Greenfield | 3:50 |
| 5. | "Instead of This" | Black, Burnel, Cornwell, Greenfield | 4:34 |
| 6. | "Long Black Veil" | Black, Burnel, Greenfield, Roberts, Warne | 3:57 |
| 7. | "Dutch Moon" | Black, Burnel, Greenfield, Roberts, Warne | 4:15 |
| 8. | "My Fickle Resolve" | | 4:41 |
| 9. | "Don't Bring Harry" | Black, Burnel, Cornwell, Greenfield | 3:49 |
| 10. | "Cruel Garden" | Black, Burnel, Cornwell, Greenfield | 2:41 |
| 11. | "Mine All Mine" | Black, Burnel, Greenfield, Roberts, Warne | 3:38 |
| 12. | "Bitching" | Black, Burnel, Cornwell, Greenfield | 4:37 |
| 13. | "Old Codger" | Black, Burnel, Cornwell, Greenfield | 3:18 |
| 14. | "Sanfte Kuss" | Black, Burnel, Greenfield, Roberts, Warne | 2:50 |

- Recorded live at the 2011 "Weekendinblack" Stranglers convention on 19 and 20 November at the Camden Centre in London.

== Personnel ==
The Stranglers

- Jet Black – drums, percussion, production
- Jean-Jacques Burnel – bass, vocals (lead on 2, 3, 7, 9), production
- Dave Greenfield – keyboards, vocals, production
- Baz Warne – guitar, vocals (lead on 3–6, 8, 10), production

Additional musicians

- Neil Sparkes – additional percussion (6, 7)

Technical

- Louie Nicastro – production
- Dave Mullen – artwork, design
- David Boni – photography
