= Norfolk Coast =

Norfolk Coast may refer to:

- Norfolk Coast AONB, an Area of Outstanding Natural Beauty as defined by the organisation Natural England
- Norfolk Coast Path, part of the Peddars Way and Norfolk Coast Path, a National Trail this part of which runs along the coastal edge of the Norfolk Coast AONB
- Norfolk Coast (album), an album by The Stranglers released in 2004, and it is also the name of a short film featuring rearranged music from the album
