= Past Go: Collected =

Compilation album by Peter Hammill
- Released: September 1996
- Genre: Art rock
- Label: Fie! Records
- Producer: Peter Hammill, David Lord

Peter Hammill chronology
X My Heart (1996)	Past Go: Collected (1996)	The Margin (1996)

Professional ratings
Review scores
Source	Rating
Allmusic	4/5 stars

Past Go: Collected is an album by Peter Hammill, originally released on Fie! Records in 1996.

The album is a selection of Hammill's songs from some of his earlier albums in the Fie! catalogue.

== Track listing ==
All songs written by Peter Hammill.

1. "A Kick to Kill the Kiss"
2. "I Will Find You"
3. "Accidents"
4. "His Best Girl"
5. "Sharply Unclear"
6. "Patient"
7. "Planet Coventry"
8. "A Ritual Mask"
9. "The Noise"
10. "The Gift of Fire"
11. "Traintime"
12. "Gaia"
13. "Your Tall Ship"

== Personnel ==
- Peter Hammill – vocals, guitar, keyboards
- Manny Elias – drums, percussion
- Guy Evans – drums, percussion
- Nic Potter – bass
- John Ellis – guitar
- Stuart Gordon – violin
- David Jackson – saxophones, flutes
- David Lord – keyboards, arrangements
- Simon Clarke – Hammond organ
