= Patience (Peter Hammill album) =

Studio album by Peter Hammill
- Released: 19 August 1983
- Recorded: December 1982
- Studios: Crescent Studios, Bath
- Genre: Art rock
- Length: 40:28
- Label: Naive
- Producer: Peter Hammill

Peter Hammill chronology
Loops and Reels (1983)	Patience (1983)	The Love Songs (1984)

Professional ratings
Review scores
Source	Rating
Allmusic	3/5 stars

Patience is the 13th studio album by Peter Hammill. It was released in August 1983 on Naive Records, a label founded by Gordian Troeller, the former manager of Hammill's band Van der Graaf Generator. It was remastered in 1991 and released on Fie! Records. It was the second album to feature the collective known as the K Group (the first was Enter K): Hammill, drummer Guy Evans and bassist Nic Potter (both Hammill's former colleagues in VdGG), and guitarist John Ellis (of The Vibrators and Peter Gabriel's band).

Patience reached #15 in the UK Indie Chart.

The members of K Group adopted aliases during their time in the band. Hammill was known as "K", Evans was known as "Brain", Ellis was known as "Fury", and Potter was known as "Mozart".

"Patient", "Traintime" and "Comfortable" have all been played regularly by Hammill in live performance in later years.

"Just Good Friends" was re-worked for Hammill's 1984 album The Love Songs.

== Track listing ==
All songs written by Peter Hammill.

Side one
No.	Title	Length
1.	"Labour Of Love"	5:50
2.	"Film Noir"	4:13
3.	"Just Good Friends"	4:20
4.	"Jeunesse d'Orée"	4:45
Total length:		19:08

Side two
No.	Title	Length
5.	"Traintime"	4:23
6.	"Now More Than Ever"	5:36
7.	"Comfortable?"	4:52
8.	"Patient"	6:11
Total length:		21:02

== Personnel ==
- Peter Hammill – vocals, piano, acoustic and electric guitar
- Guy Evans – drums, percussion
- Nic Potter – bass
- John Ellis – guitar

=== Additional musicians ===
- David Jackson – saxophone and panpipes on 1 and 7
- Stuart Gordon – violin on 3
- David Lord – Prophet 5 on 3

=== Technical ===
- David Lord – recording engineer, mixing (Crescent Studios, Bath)
