= The Full English =

The Full English may refer to:

- The Full English (album), a 2005 solo album by Judge Smith
- The Full English (folk music archive), a digital archive of English folk song collections
- Full English (TV series), a British animated sitcom that aired in 2012
- Full breakfast, a cooked morning meal centred on eggs and bacon, popular in the UK and UK-influenced cultures
- The Full English, a nickname for both European club football finals (UEFA Champions League and UEFA Europa League)
