= Michael Brand =

Michael Brand may refer to:

- Mihály Mosonyi (born Michael Brand, 1815–1870), Hungarian composer
- Michael Brand (composer) (born 1952), English orchestral conductor and composer
- Michael Brand (art historian) (born 1958), Australian art historian and museum director
- Michael Brand (politician) (born 1973), German politician
