= About Time (The Stranglers album) =

Studio album by the Stranglers
- Released: 15 May 1995
- Studio: Rockfield Studios, Monmouth, Wales; Parr Street Studios, Liverpool, UK; Westside Studios, London, UK
- Genre: Post-punk
- Length: 44:54
- Label: When!
- Producer: Alan Winstanley; The Stranglers

The Stranglers chronology
| Stranglers in the Night (1993) | About Time (1995) | Written in Red (1997) |

Singles from About Time
- 1. "Lies and Deception" Released: June 1995

About Time is the twelfth studio album from the Stranglers and the second one from the Black, Burnel, Greenfield, Roberts and Ellis line-up. The album was released in 1995 through the When! label. It was co-produced, engineered and mixed by Alan Winstanley, who had worked with the Stranglers on their first four albums (as the engineer on Rattus Norvegicus, No More Heroes and Black and White and producer on The Raven). Nigel Kennedy plays electric violin on "Face", and a string-quartet is used on three of the eleven tracks ("Face", "Still Life" and "Sinister").

"Lies and Deception" was the only single released from the album, reaching No. 94 on the UK Singles Chart, and is one of the few Stranglers songs solely written by drummer Jet Black. Released as a two-CD set, CD1 of "Lies and Deception" was backed with non-album tracks "Swim" and "Cool Danny", CD2 was backed with non-album tracks "Kiss the World Goodbye" and "Bed of Nails".

The album peaked at No. 31 in the UK Albums Chart in May 1995.

== Critical reception ==
Professional ratings
Review scores
| Source | Rating |
|---|---|
| AllMusic | 2/5 stars |
| Encyclopedia of Popular Music | 2/5 stars |
| The Great Rock Discography | 4/10 |

AllMusic's Stephen Thomas Erlewine wrote that About Time is a "competent but unexceptional record" that contains "a couple of tough, catchy songs" in "Lies and Deception" and "Golden Boy", but is "largely bogged down by tepid songwriting and undistinguished performances."

== Track listing ==
All tracks are written by the Stranglers

| No. | Title | Length |
|---|---|---|
| 1. | "Golden Boy" | 3:13 |
| 2. | "Money" | 3:20 |
| 3. | "Face" | 3:27 |
| 4. | "Sinister" | 4:44 |
| 5. | "Little Blue Lies" | 3:34 |
| 6. | "Still Life" | 5:20 |
| 7. | "Paradise Row" | 3:51 |
| 8. | "She Gave It All" | 4:45 |
| 9. | "Lies and Deception" | 3:50 |
| 10. | "Lucky Finger" | 4:14 |
| 11. | "And the Boat Sails By" | 4:33 |

== Personnel ==
The Stranglers

- Paul Roberts – lead vocals, percussion, production
- Jean-Jacques Burnel – bass, vocals, production
- John Ellis – guitar, vocals, production
- Dave Greenfield – keyboards, vocals, production
- Jet Black – drums, production

Additional musicians

- Nigel Kennedy – violin on track 3
- Susie Elliott – vocals on track 4 and 11
- Chris Winter – harmonica on track 1
- Gavyn Wright and Wilfred Gibson – violin on track 3, 4 and 6
- Bob Smissen – viola on track 3, 4 and 6
- Caroline Dale – cello on track 3, 4 and 6
- Alex Christaki – string arrangements on track 3, 4 and 6

Technical

- Alan Winstanley – production, engineering, mixing
- Simon Dawson – engineering assistance (Rockfield Studios)
- Andrea Wright – engineering assistance (Parr Street Studios)
- Lee Phillips – engineering assistance (Westside Studios)
- Tim Young – mastering
- Trevor Dawkins – technical assistance, crowd vocal
- Ray Palmer – front cover image, photography
- Michel Tcherevkoff – front cover image
- Castle Communications PLC – design
- Hugh Gilmour – illustrations
