= The Climber (album) =

Studio album by Judge Smith
- Released: 17 May 2010
- Recorded: May 2009; Gunnar Saevigs Hall, Grieg Institute, Bergen, Norway
- Genres: Art rock, songstory
- Length: 34:51 plus a bonus track of 5:58
- Label: Masters of Art
- Producer: Ricardo Odriozola

Judge Smith chronology
Long-Range Audio Device (2008)	The Climber (2010)	Orfeas (2011)

The Climber is the seventh solo album by Judge Smith, and after Curly's Airships (2000) his second "songstory". It is vocal music, accompanied by a double bass. The album is sung by Smith and a male-voice choir called The Fløyen Voices.

== Story ==
The Climber tells the story of a lonely British mountaineer who visits the Italian Alps in the mid-20th century who sees mountain climbing as a romantic conquest. The local community however see it as something dangerous. The mountaineer wishes to climb a mountain all by himself, but the local community won't let him, so he sneaks out as they aren't watching. But on the mountain he gets surprised by the weather, and freezes into a state between life and death, forcing the local community to go out and save him.

== Production ==
Michael Brand arranged the score by Smith for a male-voice choir, and Ricardo Odriozola later did choral arrangements and arranged the part of the double bass. On 9 May 2009, The Climber premiered at USF Verftet in Bergen, Norway, sung by Judge Smith and a male-voice choir called The Fløyen Voices, and accompanied by a double bass. This same line-up recorded the album a few days later, 12 May, at the Grieg Institute in Bergen. The Climber has not been performed live since.

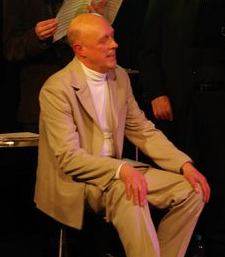
Judge Smith performing The Climber in USF Verftet, Bergen, Norway, 9 May 2009

== Release ==
Although the album's copyright is from 2009, The Climber was released 17 May 2010. It contains a bonus track, which is a preview in the form of an "audio trailer" of Smith's next album, Orfeas (on the CD spelled as "Orpheus").

== Reception ==
In February 2010 Mike Butler wrote for Dyverse music: "The tension between the hero, self-deluded and oblivious to danger, and the choir, doubling as voice of reason and implacable force of nature, is brilliantly handled, and as exciting as a good book."

== Track listing ==
All songs written by Judge Smith. Choral arrangements by Michael Brand and Ricardo Odriozola.

1. "Chapter One" – 5:52
2. "Chapter Two" – 4:14
3. "Chapter Three" – 4:05
4. "Chapter Four" – 5:19
5. "Chapter Five" – 5:09
6. "Chapter Six" – 6:52
7. "Chapter Seven" – 3:25

As a bonus track there is a trailer for Smith's next album Orfeas, on the CD spelled as "Orpheus".

8. "Silent Track" – 2:00
9. "Trailer for 'Orpheus'" – 5:58

== Personnel ==
- Judge Smith – voice
- The Fløyen Voices – choir
- Petter B. Høiaas – conductor
- Leif O. Korsnes – double bass
