= Suite XVI =

Studio album by the Stranglers
- Released: 18 September 2006
- Recorded: 2006
- Studio: Charlton Farm Studios, Bath, UK
- Genre: Punk rock; post-punk
- Length: 40:27
- Label: Liberty / EMI / Coursegood
- Producer: Louie Nicastro

The Stranglers chronology
Norfolk Coast (2004)	Suite XVI (2006)	Giants (2012)

Singles from Suite XVI
- 1. "Spectre of Love" Released: 11 September 2006

Professional ratings
Review scores
Source	Rating
AllMusic	3/5 stars
PopMatters	8/10
Vive le Rock!	4/5 stars

Suite XVI is the sixteenth studio album by the Stranglers, released on 18 September 2006 by Liberty EMI Records. It saw the band return as a four-piece after the departure of singer Paul Roberts, with lead vocals shared between guitarist Baz Warne and bassist Jean-Jacques Burnel. The album continues, but also builds on, the shift to a more recognisable sound seen in the previous album, Norfolk Coast, with a sound much more akin to the band's earlier sound during the 1970s and early 1980s. The album was supported by an extensive UK tour by the band and peaked at number 89 in the UK Albums Chart.

The album was released in Japan with two bonus tracks (taken from the B-side of the UK single "Spectre of Love"). In 2022, the XVI Anniversary Remastered Edition was re-issued by Coursegood Ltd and entered the UK albums chart at number 45.

== Background ==
The writing process for Suite XVI began in January 2005 in a rented house in Looe in Cornwall, where Jean-Jacques Burnel and Baz Warne spent six weeks working on new songs. Paul Roberts wasn't invited, which eventually led to friction within the band. In June 2006, Roberts officially left the Stranglers during the recording of Suite XVI, having already completed lead vocals for 9 of the 11 tracks. Burnel told The Burning Up Times web site, "He was obviously frustrated within the Stranglers ... Also, none of his songs were accepted for the new album ... we all put our songs in the melting pot ... but it wasn't happening with his. There was a lack of commitment." Roberts said in 2007, "The fact of the matter is they started to do work without me, a couple of the members, and I found that incredibly insensitive and offensive and I just decided that enough was enough." He also stated that it was "an acrimonious departure," where "bad feelings" built up over time.

Burnel and Warne subsequently re-recorded the vocals on each track, Warne singing lead on six tracks and Burnel on four. On "Unbroken", the two share lead vocals, Burnel singing the verse and bridge, and Warne the chorus. The album was recorded at the band's own Charlton Farm Studios near Bath.

"Bless You (Save You, Spare You, Damn You)" features backing vocals from Lucy Lewry, who Burnel and Warne heard sing at an open mic night at the local pub in Looe during their stay. When it came time to record the track, the band called her "and she came up and did a great job of making the chorus haunting and very atmospheric," Warne said.

== Musical style ==
Tracks range from the aggression of "Summat Outanowt", through the catchy "She's Slipping Away" to the machine-gun punk delivery of "A Soldier's Diary" (which, according to drummer Jet Black, is the fastest track yet recorded by the band) and back to the melodic ballad of "Bless You (Save You, Spare You, Damn You)". There's a foray into country with the biting "I Hate You" and the album finishes off with "Relentless" — a sonically relentless exploration of the passing of time. "See Me Coming" was originally recorded by Burnel for the 2004 Japanese animated TV series Gankutsuou: The Count of Monte Cristo.

== Lyrics ==
Lyrically, the album covers a number of different subjects. In a "track-by-track" feature on the Stranglers' web site in 2016, Baz Warne discussed the album, revealing that "Spectre of Love" was a very personal song, written about, and for, his daughter, with whom he had a strained relationship at the time. "Relentless" is about all things eternal, such as time and love, and "Barbara (Shangri-La)" reminisces about a past love. "Summat Outanowt" (something out of nothing) is about someone who makes "mountains out of molehills, blowing everything out of all proportion." The song includes references to two films: the line "I'm not the bad albino" refer to The Da Vinci Code and "Something that reminds me of a rabbit horror show" refer to Fatal Attraction.

The inspiration for "Bless You (Save You, Spare You, Damn You)" was drawn from the bubonic plague and its connection to sneezing, which was often the first sign that someone had the disease. Warne elaborated on the song's title, saying, "Bless You (you’ve sneezed once), Save You (twice), Spare You (thrice) and Damn You (you've sneezed 4 times ... you're dead)."

Elsewhere on the album, "She's Slipping Away" deals with domestic violence, "Anything Can Happen" concerns George W. Bush and the United States foreign policy in the Middle East, and "A Soldier's Diary" is inspired by letters and diaries found in the allied trenches during World War I. According to Warne, "I Hate You" was the topic of much discussion at the time of its release, but the song's writer, Burnel, has not disclosed who the song is aimed at.

== Track listing ==
All tracks are written by Jet Black, Jean-Jacques Burnel, Dave Greenfield and Baz Warne, except where noted

No.	Title	Writer(s)	Length
1.	"Unbroken"	Black, Burnel, Greenfield, Paul Roberts, Warne	3:47
2.	"Spectre of Love"		3:34
3.	"She's Slipping Away"	Black, Burnel, Greenfield, Roberts, Warne	3:29
4.	"Summat Outanowt"		2:14
5.	"Anything Can Happen"		3:54
6.	"See Me Coming"	Burnel	3:56
7.	"Bless You (Save You, Spare You, Damn You)"		5:35
8.	"A Soldier's Diary"		2:19
9.	"Barbara (Shangri-La)"		3:44
10.	"I Hate You"		2:58
11.	"Relentless"		5:02
Total length:			40:27

Japanese CD bonus tracks
No.	Title	Writer(s)	Length
12.	"Instead of This" (live acoustic)	Black, Burnel, Hugh Cornwell, Greenfield	4:34
13.	"Death and Night and Blood (Yukio)" (live)	Black, Burnel, Cornwell, Greenfield	2:28
Total length:			47:29

- Bonus tracks recorded live at Shepherd's Bush Empire, London, 2 December 2005. "Death and Night and Blood" is taken from the "Spectre of Love" 7" single and "Instead of This" from the "Spectre of Love" CD single.

== Singles ==
- "Spectre of Love" (released 11 September 2006) – #57, UK Singles Chart

== Personnel ==
The Stranglers

- Jet Black – drums, percussion
- Jean-Jacques Burnel – bass, vocals (lead on 1, 4–6, 10)
- Dave Greenfield – keyboards, vocals
- Baz Warne – guitar, vocals (lead on 1–3, 7–9, 11), harmonica (10), Jew's harp (10)

Additional musicians

- Paul Roberts – percussion (5)
- Lucy Lewry – backing vocals (7)

Technical

- Louie Nicastro – production, engineering
- Matt Sweeting – photography
- Phil Johnson – artwork, design

Bonus tracks

- Paul Roberts – congas (12), backing vocals (13)
- Max Bisgrove – engineering (12, 13)

== Charts ==
2022 chart performance for Suite XVI
Chart (2022)	Peak position
Scottish Albums (OCC)	7
UK Albums (OCC)	45
UK Independent Albums (OCC)	4
