= Orfeas (album) =

Studio album by Judge Smith
- Released: 9 May 2011
- Recorded: Aug 2008–2010
- Genres: Art rock, songstory
- Length: 77:42
- Label: Masters of Art
- Producer: Judge Smith

Judge Smith chronology
The Climber (2010)	Orfeas (2011)	Zoot Suit (2013)

Orfeas is the eighth solo album by Judge Smith, and his third "songstory" after Curly's Airships (2000) and The Climber (2010). Orfeas is notable because of the use of speech music, where a musical instrument plays along with spoken words at the same pitch of each syllable. The album incorporates a variety of musical styles, ranging from a string sextet, trance music, acoustic guitar music, and death metal. Finally, the music by the George Orfeas Band is notable because the electric guitar (by John Ellis who plays George Orfeas) and the saxophones (by David Jackson who plays Maxwell Blow) play identical melodic lines simultaneously.

== Story ==
The story of Orfeas is loosely based on the myth of Orpheus. In three acts Orfeas tells the story of the talented and successful guitar player George Orfeas, who is fed up with his playing and his success, but then suddenly loses his guitar he calls Furry Dice. Subsequently he nearly dies in a car crash in Cuilfail Tunnel. After meeting his muse Eurydice somewhere between life and death he regains his humility and is allowed to return to the land of the living, on the condition that he does not look back. After his return, the George Orfeas Band does not play any of the old songs anymore. Seduced to play his old hits once again, however, his career comes to an end.

== Production ==
The recordings of the George Orfeas Band were largely done in Nogaredo in Italy. Ricardo Odriozola and Ben Nation recorded the string sextet sessions in Norway. Trance music producer Andy Haldane contributed to the trance parts. David Minnick was the arranger, producer and co-performer of the parts with speech music. The mysterious band Black Path recorded their death metal parts. Lastly, in 2010 the solos by John Ellis and David Jackson were recorded.

== Cover art ==
A photography session was done in January 2011 to portray George Orfeas, Eurydice and other players in the CD booklet.

== Reception ==
Dom Lawson of Prog Magazine in January 2012 called Orfeas "weird, witty and resolutely eccentric." Malcolm Dome of Classic Rock Magazine wrote in June 2011 that Smith told the story of Orpheus "with a resonant sympathy yet also a darkly devious humour". Babyblaue Seiten in April 2012 called Orfeas "a wonderfully entertaining album". In May 2012 the Rocktologist wrote: "This isn't really music as we know it, but if you like different types of art, this is bound to appeal to you" (7 out of 10). And Shakefire, in April 2012 called the album "something insanely good" (rating 4.05 out of 4).

== Track listing ==
All songs written by Judge Smith.

Act One – Hamartia

1. "The Bard – One" – 1:55
2. "Rundown Rudi" – 4:13
3. "Soliloquy – One" – 0:46
4. "Seven Yard Promenade" – 3:33
5. "Interview – One" – 3:28
6. "Orphic Lullaby" – 4:01
7. "Soliloquy – Two" – 0:51
8. "Wolfman George" – 3:14
9. "Soliloquy – Three" – 1:25

Act Two – Anagnorisis

10. "The Bard – Two" – 1:41
11. "Soliloquy – Four" – 1:43
12. "In-Flight Movie – One" – 3:11
13. "Orfeas and Eurydice – One" – 2:59
14. "In-Flight Movie – Two" – 0:58
15. "In Hell – One" – 0:18
16. "Carpet of Bones" – 4:31
17. "In Hell – Two" – 0:41
18. "In-Flight Movie – Three" – 0:52
19. "Orfeas and Eurydice – Two" – 1:53
20. "The Crab Nebula" – 1:47
21. "Orfeas and Eurydice – Three" – 1:11
22. "Orfeas' Audition" – 4:49
23. "Don't Look Back" – 2:42
24. "In-Flight Movie – Four" – 1:16

Act Three – Peripeteia

25. "Interview – Two" – 4:11
26. "Fishin' in the Styx" – 3:28
27. "Soliloquy – Five" – 0:49
28. "Don't Deafen Me, Persephone" – 4:28
29. "The Bard – Three" – 1:18
30. "Soliloquy – Six" – 0:48
31. "Catastrophe in Czecho" – 1:32
32. "An Announcement" – 0:43
33. "Tear Him Asunder" – 4:07
34. "The Bard – Four" – 2:17

== Personnel ==
as The George Orfeas Band

- John Ellis – lead guitar (the hands of Orfeas) and rhythm guitar
- David Jackson – saxophones (Maxwell Blow)
- Marco Olivotto – bass
- Bert Santilly – accordion (Ronnie)
- David Shaw-Parker – MC Hi Crimes
- Gigi Cavalli Cocchi – drums

as Eurydice

- Lene Lovich – voice

as the bard Anachronistes

- David Shaw-Parker – voice and acoustic guitar

as the band in Hell & Bacchus

- Black Path – music
- René van Commenée – guest lead voice

the interview ensemble

- Ricardo Odriozola – violins and violas
- Ben Nation – cellos
- David Shaw-Parker – voice (Mike Tyger)
- Dorie Jackson – radio jingle voice

the Soliloquies

- David Minnick – percussion, keyboards, guitar, bass
- John Ellis – speech-music guitar

as George Orfeas

- Judge Smith – voice
