= 10 (The Stranglers album) =

Studio album by the Stranglers
- Released: 5 March 1990
- Recorded: Autumn 1989
- Studio: Wisseloord Studios, Hilversum, Netherlands
- Genre: Post-punk
- Length: 36:23
- Label: Epic
- Producer: Roy Thomas Baker

The Stranglers chronology
Dreamtime (1986)	10 (1990)	Stranglers in the Night (1992)

Singles from 10
- 1. "96 Tears" Released: 5 February 1990; 2. "Sweet Smell of Success" Released: 9 April 1990

10 is the tenth studio album by English rock band the Stranglers, released in March 1990 by Epic Records. It was the last to feature guitarist/lead singer Hugh Cornwell. 10 peaked at No. 15 and spent four weeks in the UK Albums Chart.

There was a big band sound to this album, possibly due to the production work of Roy Thomas Baker and the continued use of a horn section. One of the highlights was the cover version of Question Mark & the Mysterians' hit "96 Tears" (which reached No. 17 in the UK Singles Chart). Cornwell has expressed satisfaction with the way this album turned out, whereas the rest of the band, including live guitarist John Ellis, who joined the band on the next album, have all expressed negative feelings about 10.

Singles released in the UK for this album were "96 Tears" and "Sweet Smell of Success" (UK No. 65). "Man of the Earth" was due to be the third single from the album, however, Epic decided against it.

== Background ==
Since the Stranglers last album Dreamtime, released in October 1986, the band had toured extensively until the end of 1987, released the 1987 single "All Day and All of the Night", and the 1988 live album All Live and All of the Night. The band had begun recording 10 in bassist Jean-Jacques Burnel's newly built 16-track home studio in Cambridgeshire in 1988. By 1989, with help from local engineer Owen Morris, the band had recorded around 20 tracks which they delivered to their label CBS/Epic for a late 1989 release. The label's A&R man Muff Winwood, however, was unhappy with the production and suggested re-recording the album with producer Roy Thomas Baker, aiming for the American market. According to Hugh Cornwell in his 2001 book The Stranglers: Song by Song, the band had never heard of Baker before but were told he had produced various successful Queen albums. "Roy was sold to us on the basis that he could produce the sound that the Americans wanted," Cornwell said.

The album was recorded in autumn 1989 at Wisseloord Studios in the Netherlands. To achieve a bigger sound on the album, Baker would multi-track Cornwell's guitars. "Whenever I had a guitar part, Roy would make me play it 22 times and record it on separate tracks," Cornwell said. "He'd then mix it all down to stereo and it would sound immense with 22 guitars all playing the same part." At the suggestion of Baker, the band also recorded a cover of "96 Tears" for the album. The spoken section on "Let's Celebrate" is read by Baker's wife, Tere.

Despite the album's American-friendly sound and the moderate success of "Sweet Smell of Success" in the United States (reaching No. 5 on the US Modern Rock Chart), the band did not undertake a US tour. Cornwell, feeling the band had come to a halt in their artistic evolution, decided to leave the band following the last gig on the supporting tour.

== Album cover ==
The album sleeve shows the members of the band dressed up as ten of the most notable world leaders of the time (l-r: Yasser Arafat, Rajiv Gandhi, Pope John Paul II, Mikhail Gorbachev, Margaret Thatcher, George H. W. Bush, Fidel Castro, Muammar al-Gaddafi, Benazir Bhutto and Joshua Nkomo). The cover was created by Jean-Luke Epstein and Grant Louden from the design company Graphyk. Epstein had designed most of the Stranglers' album and single sleeves during their Epic years, starting with Aural Sculpture in 1984.

== Critical reception ==
Professional ratings
Review scores
Source	Rating
AllMusic	2.5/5 stars
Encyclopedia of Popular Music	2/5 stars
The Great Rock Discography	5/10

AllMusic's Alex Ogg called the album a "meager fare of dislocated pop and half-assed R&B," writing, "The Stranglers actually released very, very few bad albums. 10, sad to say, is one of the few, and it's an absolute stinker." Ira Robbins of Trouser Press wrote, "Although Roy Thomas Baker produced the rock'n'rolly 10 ... things didn't turn out all that bad. As horrifying as it is to hear this once-dynamic group reduced to covering "96 Tears" ... the originals that otherwise comprise the record are pretty lively." In his 1997 book No Mercy: The Authorised and Uncensored Biography of The Stranglers, David Buckley wrote that the problem with the album wasn't so much Roy Thomas Baker's production, but the fact that the songs were "simply stale and boring", with the cover "96 Tears" being the only quality song.

== Track listing ==
All tracks are written by the Stranglers, except where noted

Side one
No.	Title	Writer(s)	Length
1.	"Sweet Smell of Success"		3:22
2.	"Someone Like You"		2:53
3.	"96 Tears"	Rudy Martinez	3:12
4.	"In This Place"		3:38
5.	"Let's Celebrate"		4:16

Side two
No.	Title	Length
6.	"Man of the Earth"	3:22
7.	"Too Many Teardrops"	3:47
8.	"Where I Live"	3:32
9.	"Out of My Mind"	4:08
10.	"Never to Look Back"	4:18
Total length:		36:23

2001 CD reissue bonus tracks
No.	Title	Writer(s)	Origin	Length
11.	"Instead of This"		"96 Tears" single	3:59
12.	"Poisonality"		"96 Tears" 12" and CD single	3:40
13.	"Motorbike"		"Sweet Smell of Success" single	3:39
14.	"Something"		"Sweet Smell of Success" 12" and CD single	4:10
15.	"You"		"Golden Brown" single reissue, 1991	3:06
16.	"¡Viva Vlad!"		"All Day and All of the Night" single, 1987	3:08
17.	"All Day and All of the Night"	Ray Davies	Single, 1987; All Live and All of the Night, 1988	2:24
18.	"Always the Sun" (Sunny-Side Up Mix)		Single, 1990; original version from Dreamtime, 1986	4:03

== Personnel ==
Credits adapted from the album liner notes, except where noted.

The Stranglers

- Hugh Cornwell – guitar, lead (1–3, 5–7, 9, 12, 15–18) and backing vocals
- Jean-Jacques Burnel – bass, lead (4, 8, 10, 11, 13, 14) and backing vocals
- Dave Greenfield – keyboards, backing vocals
- Jet Black – drums, percussion

Additional personnel

- Alex Gifford – saxophone
- Sid Gauld – trumpet
- Chris Lawrence – trombone
- Stuart Brooks – trumpet solo (1)
- Simon Morton – congas (1)
- Tere Baker – voice (5)
- Pamela G. – voice (8)

Technical

- Roy Thomas Baker – producer
- Timm Baldwin – engineer
- Jean-Luke Epstein – sleeve design
- Grant Louden – sleeve design

2001 reissue

- John Ellis – additional guitar (18)
- The Stranglers – producer (all bonus tracks)
- Owen Morris – producer (11, 12, 14)
- Ted Hayton – producer (16, 17)
- Mike Kemp – producer, engineer (18)
- Bruce Lampcov – mixing (11)
- Timm Baldwin – mixing (12, 13)
- Kevin Killen – mixing (14)
- Michael H. Brauer – mixing (18)
- Tony Bridge – remastering (2001 reissue)
