= Enter K =

Studio album by Peter Hammill
- Released: October 1982
- Recorded: 1982
- Studio: Sofa Sound, Wiltshire; Crescent Studios, Bath
- Genre: Art rock
- Length: 37:31
- Label: Naive Records
- Producer: Peter Hammill

Peter Hammill chronology
Sitting Targets (1981)	Enter K (1982)	Loops and Reels (1983)

Professional ratings
Review scores
Source	Rating
Allmusic	3/5 stars

Enter K is the eleventh studio album by Peter Hammill, originally released on the Naive Records label in October 1982. The label was owned and operated by Gordian Troeller, the former manager of Hammill's band Van der Graaf Generator that had found success managing Orchestral Manoeuvres in the Dark (which Hammill has said "must have been a blessed relief after the VdGG years"). Hammill subsequently reissued the album on his own Fie! label.

The album was Hammill's first studio album to be recorded with the K Group, a band that he had formed in 1981 to tour material from his earlier albums A Black Box and Sitting Targets. Each member of the band adopted an alias: Hammill was K, John Ellis was Fury, Nic Potter was Mozart and Guy Evans was Brain. The K Group also backed Hammill during his performance on a 1981 broadcast of Rockpalast, as well as Hammill's first live album, The Margin.

Enter K reached #21 in the UK Indie Chart.

"Don't Tell Me" was re-worked for Hammill's 1984 album The Love Songs.

== Track listing ==
All songs written by Peter Hammill.

Side one
No.	Title	Length
1.	"Paradox Drive"	4:30
2.	"The Unconscious Life"	5:04
3.	"Accidents"	4:33
4.	"The Great Experiment"	5:04
Total length:		19:11

Side two
No.	Title	Length
5.	"Don't Tell Me"	4:42
6.	"She Wraps It Up"	4:20
7.	"Happy Hour"	9:18
Total length:		18:20

2003 CD Fie! Records reissue bonus track
No.	Title	Length
8.	"Seven Wonders"	4:39

== Personnel ==
k Group

- Peter Hammill (k) – vocals, guitar, keyboards
- John Ellis (Fury) – lead guitar
- Nic Potter (Mozart) – bass
- Guy Evans (Brain) – drums

with:

- David Jackson – saxophone on "The Unconscious Life" and "Don't Tell Me"

=== Technical ===
- Peter Hammill – recording engineer (Sofa Sound, Wiltshire)
- David Lord – recording engineer, mixing (Crescent Studios, Bath)
- Steve Byrne, Valerie Hawthorn – artwork
- Jo Swan – photography
