= Soulsec =

UK musical group

The British band Soulsec (formerly known as The Faithband or the 'Paul Roberts Band') is the solo project of the ex Stranglers frontman Paul Roberts.

In 1999 Paul Roberts releases his first solo album Faith?, the birth of the Faithband. They start touring in 2000 and release their second studio album Self Discovery in 2001. In 2002 they ask people to promote several gigs which initiates the Peoples' Acoustic Faith Tour. In autumn 2002 the band goes on the road again for the Set In Stone Tour. The third studio album The Pressure Sensitive is released in 2003. They start touring for the Wrong Connection Tour which has to be cancelled after three gigs. In 2004 the band decides to change their name to the Paul Roberts Band at first and finally to Soulsec. In 2005 they perform several gigs in the UK and in Belgium.

Guitarists who worked with the band since 1999 were John Ellis, Bob Elliott and Baz Warne. In 2005 Andy Ellis joined the band on guitar. Noel Watson joined the band on drums substituting Vinnie Lammie who is touring with Mel C.

As well as touring with the band and working on other projects they released five singles, many live albums and two DVDs. The latest of which is the DVD Tracks - Days of View which features highlights from the second night at the Kings Head, Fulham 2003, the acoustic MP3tv sessions with Paul & Baz and a huge selection of clips from various gigs since 2000.

In March 2006 Soulsec released the single CD Desert Soul as a promising first taster for a new album. The new album End Games was released in 2007.

== Bandmembers ==
- Vocals: Paul Roberts
- Keyboards: Richard Naiff
- Guitars: Andy Ellis
- Bass: Brad Waissman
- Drums: Mickey Sparrow

== Discography ==
- 1999: Paul Roberts - Faith?
- 2001: The Faithband - Self Discovery
- 2003: The Faithband - The Pressure Sensitive
- 2007: Soulsec - End Games
