= Sitting Targets =

Studio album by Peter Hammill
- Released: 5 June 1981
- Recorded: November 1980–February 1981
- Studio: Sofa Sound, Wiltshire
- Genre: Art rock
- Length: 44:24
- Label: Virgin
- Producer: Peter Hammill

Peter Hammill chronology
A Black Box (1980)	Sitting Targets (1981)	Enter K (1982)

Professional ratings
Review scores
Source	Rating
AllMusic	4/5 stars
Sounds	(surprising)

Sitting Targets is the tenth studio album by Peter Hammill, released on Virgin Records in June 1981. It contains several songs in the raw new wave style typical of Hammill's work in the late 1970s and early 1980s, following the dissolution of his band Van der Graaf Generator, and one of his occasional tender ballads, "Ophelia". "Stranger Still", "Sign" and "Central Hotel" have all been regularly performed by Hammill live in recent years.

"Ophelia" was re-worked for Hammill's 1984 album The Love Songs.

== Artwork ==
The cover features crash test dummies in photographs supplied by the Ford Motor Company.

== Track listing ==
All tracks are written by Peter Hammill.

Side one
No.	Title	Length
1.	"Breakthrough"	4:01
2.	"My Experience"	3:20
3.	"Ophelia"	3:16
4.	"Empress's Clothes"	4:07
5.	"Glue"	3:49
6.	"Hesitation"	4:11
Total length:		22:41

Side two
No.	Title	Length
7.	"Sitting Targets"	5:27
8.	"Stranger Still"	5:00
9.	"Sign"	3:50
10.	"What I Did"	3:43
11.	"Central Hotel"	4:42
Total length:		22:41

== Personnel ==
- Peter Hammill - vocals, guitar, keyboards
- Guy Evans - drums (tracks: 1,2,6,7,9)
- David Jackson - saxophone, flute (tracks: 4,6,7,11)
- Morris Pert - percussion (tracks: 4,7,10)
- Phil Harrison - synthesisers (tracks: 3,8,9)

=== Technical ===
- Peter Hammill - recording engineer (Sofa Sound, Wiltshire)
- David Lord - mixing (Crescent Studios, Bath)
- Rocking Russian - design
- Ford Motor Company - photography
