= Written in Red =

Studio album by the Stranglers
- Released: 27 January 1997
- Studio: Parr Street Studios; The Greenhouse; Gemini Studios; Intimate Studios; Mixed at September Sound, Matrix Studios and Greenhouse Studios.
- Genre: New wave
- Length: 40:51
- Label: When!
- Producer: Andrew Gill; The Stranglers; Cenzo Townsend

The Stranglers chronology
| About Time (1995) | Written in Red (1997) | Coup de Grace (1998) |

Singles from Written in Red
- 1. "In Heaven She Walks" Released: 3 February 1997

Professional ratings
Review scores
| Source | Rating |
|---|---|
| AllMusic | 2/5 stars |
| Encyclopedia of Popular Music | 2/5 stars |
| The Great Rock Discography | 4/10 |

Written in Red is the thirteenth studio album recorded by the Stranglers, released in January 1997 through the When! label. It was co-produced by Gang of Four's Andy Gill.

The media launch-party for Written in Red was held on 13 December 1996 at EuroDisney in Paris, and featured live performances of tracks from the effort. Other tracks performed at the event include "Always the Sun", "Golden Brown" and "Let Me Introduce You to the Family".

The week the album was released, the band performed at several HMV branches including those located in Birmingham, Nottingham, Sheffield and Leeds.

"In Heaven She Walks" was the only single to be taken from the album, released on 3 February 1997. The single was in two parts: the first CD featured a sleeve similar to the Written in Red cover, with a track listing of: "In Heaven She Walks", a live version of "Golden Brown" from 1995, and an extended version of "In Heaven She Walks". The second CD sleeve featured a still from the video; the tracks were "In Heaven She Walks", and live versions of "Grip" and "Something Better Change" (also from 1995).

It was the first Stranglers studio album that failed to reach the Top 40 in the UK Albums Chart, peaking at No. 52 in February 1997. In his review for AllMusic, Stephen Thomas Erlewine wrote that though the Stranglers sound "tight and professional," the album "lacks strong songs, making Written in Red an utterly undistinguished album."

In 2014, bass player Jean-Jacques Burnel said of the album, "...it had nothing to do with me apart from one or two songs. I've got no feelings about it as an album as I was disconnected from it all. I had given up on the band, it wasn't a band anymore, just John and Paul and a guy with Protools."

== Track listing ==
All tracks are written by the Stranglers, except where noted.

| No. | Title | Writer(s) | Length |
|---|---|---|---|
| 1. | "Valley of the Birds" | | 3:15 |
| 2. | "In Heaven She Walks" | | 3:49 |
| 3. | "In a While" | | 3:19 |
| 4. | "Silver into Blue" | | 3:28 |
| 5. | "Blue Sky" | | 3:41 |
| 6. | "Here" | | 4:21 |
| 7. | "Joy de Viva" | | 3:39 |
| 8. | "Miss You" | | 3:52 |
| 9. | "Daddy's Riding the Range" | | 4:19 |
| 10. | "Summer in the City" | John Sebastian, Mark Sebastian, Steve Boone | 3:27 |
| 11. | "Wonderful Land" | | 3:41 |
| Total length: | | | 40:51 |

2014 expanded vinyl edition

Written in Red was reissued as a 2-LP limited edition by Let Them Eat Vinyl, including 2 bonus tracks.

Side one
| No. | Title | Length |
|---|---|---|
| 1. | "Valley of the Birds" | 3:15 |
| 2. | "In Heaven She Walks" | 3:49 |
| 3. | "In a While" | 3:19 |
| 4. | "Silver into Blue" | 3:28 |

Side two
| No. | Title | Length |
|---|---|---|
| 5. | "Blue Sky" | 3:41 |
| 6. | "Here" | 4:21 |
| 7. | "Joy de Viva" | 3:39 |
| 8. | "Miss You" | 3:52 |

Side three
| No. | Title | Writer(s) | Length |
|---|---|---|---|
| 9. | "Daddy's Riding the Range" | | 4:19 |
| 10. | "Summer in the City" | John Sebastian, Mark Sebastian, Steve Boone | 3:27 |
| 11. | "Wonderful Land" | | 3:41 |

Side four
| No. | Title | Writer(s) | Length |
|---|---|---|---|
| 12. | "Golden Brown" (live at the Kentish Town Forum, London, December 1995) | Hugh Cornwell, Jean-Jacques Burnel, Dave Greenfield, Jet Black | 3:27 |
| 13. | "In Heaven She Walks" (extended version) | | 4:45 |

- Tracks 12 and 13 are taken from the "In Heaven She Walks" CD single.

== Personnel ==
The Stranglers

- Paul Roberts – lead vocals, percussion, production
- Jean-Jacques Burnel – bass, vocals, production
- John Ellis – guitar, vocals, production
- Dave Greenfield – keyboards, vocals, production
- Jet Black – drums, production

Additional musicians

- Dave Billows – vocals

Technical

- Andy Gill – production, mixing (5, 9)
- Cenzo Townsend – additional production, engineering assistance, mixing (1, 2, 4–11)
- Mike 'Spike' Drake – mixing (3)
- Jock Loveband – engineering
- Peter Schweir – engineering
- Pete Woodruff – engineering
- Chris Madden – engineering
- Mitsou Tate – engineering assistance, additional programming
- Andrea Wright – engineering assistance
- Gordon Vicary – mastering
- Trevor Dawkins – equipment co-ordination
- Ichiro Kono – photography
- Joe Wright – design, direction

Vinyl edition bonus tracks

- Max Bisgrove – mixing (12)
- George Allen – mixing assistant (12)
- Cenzo Townsend – remixing (13)
