= Stranglers in the Night =

Studio album by the Stranglers
- Released: 7 September 1992
- Recorded: 1991–1992
- Studio: Steptoe Recorders; Studio Audio; Dojo; Jacobs Studios; Sarm East/Sarm West; Metropolis
- Genre: Rock; post-punk
- Length: 51:28
- Label: Psycho
- Producer: Mike Kemp

The Stranglers chronology
10 (1990)	Stranglers in the Night (1992)	About Time (1995)

Singles from Stranglers in the Night
- 1. "Heaven or Hell" Released: 10 August 1992; 2. "Sugar Bullets" Released: 26 October 1992

Alternative cover
- North American version

Professional ratings
Review scores
Source	Rating
AllMusic	1.5/5 stars
Encyclopedia of Popular Music	2/5 stars
The Great Rock Discography	4/10
NME	2/10

Stranglers in the Night is the eleventh studio album by the Stranglers and the first release on the band's own record label, Psycho, in 1992.

It opened the recording career of the Stranglers MK II, with Paul Roberts on vocals and John Ellis on guitar. The band returned to a purer, less "produced" sound; the horns have departed and the songs have a less-constrained, harder edge. Styles vary from ballads such as "Southern Mountains" and "Grand Canyon" to the fast-paced "Sugar Bullets" and "Brainbox". The album marks the second Stranglers album to be produced by Mike Kemp, the first being 1986's Dreamtime.

The North American version of this album (with a white, rather than dark grey, cover) contained three extra tracks ("Coffee Shop", "Vicious Circles" and "So Uncool"), which were originally B-sides in the UK. The album peaked at No. 33 in the UK Albums Chart in September 1992. The single "Heaven or Hell" was released from the album, and peaked at No. 46 in the UK Singles Chart in August 1992. The follow-up single, "Sugar Bullets", failed to chart.

== Track listing ==
All tracks are written by the Stranglers.

No.	Title	Length
1.	"Time to Die"	3:51
2.	"Sugar Bullets"	5:26
3.	"Heaven or Hell"	4:31
4.	"Laughing at the Rain"	3:42
5.	"This Town"	5:18
6.	"Brainbox"	2:48
7.	"Southern Mountains"	3:46
8.	"Gain Entry to Your Soul"	4:28
9.	"Grand Canyon"	4:11
10.	"Wet Afternoon"	4:02
11.	"Never See"	4:00
12.	"Leave It to the Dogs"	5:32
Total length:		51:28

North American bonus tracks
No.	Title	Origin	Length
13.	"Coffee Shop"	B-side of "Heaven or Hell"	4:30
14.	"Vicious Circles"	B-side of "Heaven or Hell"	3:22
15.	"So Uncool"	B-side of "Sugar Bullets"	3:08
Total length:			62:25

== Personnel ==
The Stranglers

- Paul Roberts – vocals
- Jean-Jacques Burnel – bass, vocals
- John Ellis – guitar, vocals
- Dave Greenfield – keyboards, vocals
- Jet Black – drums, percussion

Additional musicians

- Simon Morton – additional percussion

Technical

- Mike Kemp – production
- The Stranglers – production on "Coffee Shop" and "Vicious Circles"
- Richard Norris – engineering
- Jill Furmanovsky – photography
- Cactus – sleeve design
- Simon J. Webb – Psycho Records logo design
