= Dark Matters (The Stranglers album) =

Studio album by the Stranglers
- Released: 10 September 2021
- Recorded: 2019–2021
- Studio: Charlton Farm Studios, Bath; OX4 Sound Studios, Oxford; Baz Warne home studio, Yorkshire unknown studio, France
- Length: 42:55
- Label: Coursegood
- Producer: Louie Nicastro

The Stranglers chronology
Giants (2012)	Dark Matters (2021)

Singles from Dark Matters
- 1. "And If You Should See Dave..." Released: 14 May 2021; 2. "If Something's Gonna Kill Me (It Might As Well Be Love)" Released: 7 August 2021; 3. "This Song" Released: September 2021

Professional ratings
Review scores
Source	Rating
The Arts Desk	3/5 stars
Benzine	4/5 stars
Classic Rock	8/10
Goldmine	4/5 stars
Gigwise	7/10
Liverpool Sound and Vision	8.5/10
Louder Than War	9/10
Maximum Volume Music	9/10
Mojo	4/5 stars
musicOMH	4/5 stars
Music Waves	4/5 stars
Ondarock	7/10
Punktuation!	5/5 stars
stereoboard.com	3/5 stars
Uncut	3.5/5 stars

Dark Matters is the eighteenth studio album by British rock band the Stranglers, released on 10 September 2021 through Coursegood. It features the playing of keyboardist Dave Greenfield, who died in 2020. It is also the first studio album recorded without founding drummer Jet Black, who retired from performing with the band in 2015, and later died in 2022.

Dark Matters entered the United Kingdom's Official Albums Chart at number 4, the highest-placed studio album by the Stranglers since Feline in 1983. It was awarded "Album of the Year" by Vive Le Rock magazine in its December 2021 issue.

== Background and recording ==
Dark Matters is the first Stranglers studio album since 2012's Giants and the first since the death of keyboardist Dave Greenfield in May 2020. The track, "And If You Should See Dave...", was written by bassist and singer Jean-Jacques Burnel as a tribute to Greenfield. Greenfield features on eight of the album's 11 tracks, with the remainder being completed by other band members remotely due to COVID-19 restrictions. The album was recorded over the course of two years with long-time producer Louie Nicastro, mainly at the Stranglers' own studio near Bath in Somerset and Mark Gardener's OX4 Sound Studios in Oxford. Additional recording was done at guitarist Baz Warne's home studio in Yorkshire and at a studio near Burnel's home in the south of France.

Burnel's "If Something's Gonna Kill Me (It Might as Well Be Love)", which also includes a lyrical tribute to Greenfield, was arranged by Warne as a Kraftwerk-inspired electro-pop track, complete with keyboard bass and programmed drums. To create the song, Nicastro, who played the keyboard parts, used only keyboards that Greenfield would have used in the early days of the Stranglers, such as Oberheim, PPG Wave and Minimoog synthesizers. The third post-Greenfield track, "The Lines", is a one-take recording featuring Burnel on acoustic guitar and Warne on lead vocals, with keyboards added later on.

Dark Matters also marks the first Stranglers studio album since original drummer Jet Black stepped away from active performances in 2015. Black does not perform on the album, but is thanked in the album's sleeve notes. He is replaced by long-time touring drummer Jim Macaulay.

"This Song" is a cover of the track "This Song Will Get Me Over You" by the band the Disciples of Spess, but is co-credited to the Stranglers; the music video features the former England footballer Stuart Pearce, a long-time fan of the band.

== Track listing ==
All tracks are written by the Stranglers, except where noted.

No.	Title	Writer(s)	Length
1.	"Water"		4:47
2.	"This Song"	Mathew Seamarks, The Stranglers	3:20
3.	"And If You Should See Dave..."		3:35
4.	"If Something's Gonna Kill Me (It Might as Well Be Love)"		4:56
5.	"No Man's Land"		2:25
6.	"The Lines"		1:37
7.	"Payday"		3:04
8.	"Down"		3:01
9.	"The Last Men on the Moon"		5:35
10.	"White Stallion"		4:45
11.	"Breathe"		5:50
Total length:			42:55

Japanese edition bonus tracks
No.	Title	Length
12.	"Toiler on the Sea" (live at TSUTAYA O-West, Tokyo, Japan, 5 November 2019)	4:39
13.	"Freedom Is Insane" (live at TSUTAYA O-West, Tokyo, Japan, 5 November 2019)	5:33
14.	"Down" (Japanese version)	3:04
Total length:		56:40

A bonus CD, Dave Greenfield – A Tribute, was issued with pre-orders made through the Stranglers' official store. It features eight previously unreleased live recordings selected by the band, celebrating Greenfield's talent. It includes four of the Stranglers songs that Greenfield performed lead vocals on: "Dead Ringer", "Peasant in the Big Shitty", "Do You Wanna?" and "Four Horsemen".

Dave Greenfield – A Tribute
No.	Title	Writer(s)	Recording date and location	Length
1.	"Dead Ringer"		O_{2} Academy Birmingham, 12 March 2016	2:54
2.	"Peasant in the Big Shitty"		Cambridge Corn Exchange, 28 March 2014	3:32
3.	"Walk On By"	Burt Bacharach, Hal David	TSUTAYA O-West, Tokyo, Japan, 5 November 2019	5:37
4.	"Do You Wanna?"		O_{2} Academy Bristol, 19 March 2016	2:31
5.	"Baroque Bordello"		O_{2} Academy Brixton, London, 22 March 2019	3:48
6.	"Four Horsemen"		Manchester Academy, 21 March 2015	3:22
7.	"This Song"	Seamarks, The Stranglers	O_{2} Academy Brixton, London, 22 March 2019	3:06
8.	"Water"		O_{2} Academy Brixton, London, 22 March 2019	4:29

== Personnel ==
Credits adapted from the album liner notes, except where noted.

The Stranglers

- Jean-Jacques Burnel – bass, lead (1, 3, 8, 10, 11) and backing vocals, acoustic guitar (6)
- Dave Greenfield – keyboards, backing vocals
- Baz Warne – guitar, lead (2–7, 9) and backing vocals
- Jim Macaulay – drums, percussion, backing vocals

Additional musicians

- Louie Nicastro – additional keyboards
- Matthew Bourne-Jones – trumpet (4)

Technical

- Louie Nicastro – producer, engineer
- Phil Johnson – sleeve design, art direction

== Charts ==
Chart performance for Dark Matters
Chart (2021)	Peak position
Belgian Albums (Ultratop Wallonia)	152
Scottish Albums (OCC)	3
UK Albums (OCC)	4
UK Independent Albums (OCC)	2
