= Coup de Grace (The Stranglers album) =

Studio album by the Stranglers
- Released: 26 October 1998
- Studio: Funny Bunny Studios, London; Matrix Studios, London; Mixed at Maison Rouge, London
- Genre: Rock
- Length: 42:46
- Label: Eagle
- Producer: David M. Allen; The Stranglers

The Stranglers chronology
Written in Red (1997)	Coup de Grace (1998)	Norfolk Coast (2004)

Professional ratings
Review scores
Source	Rating
AllMusic	2.5/5 stars
Encyclopedia of Popular Music	2/5 stars
The Great Rock Discography	4/10
NME	2/10

Coup de Grace is the fourteenth studio album by the Stranglers, released in 1998 by Eagle Records. It was the last album to feature guitarist John Ellis, who left the band in 2000.

The tracks on Coup de Grace represent a greater writing input from bassist Jean-Jacques Burnel than on more recent outings; he also sings four of the ten tracks. Heavily influenced by the band's troop-entertaining trips to such places as the Falkland Islands and Bosnia, and (in Burnel's words) "life in general", the tracks covered such topics as the ravages of war, religious conflicts, and failed relationships. The album included the minimally-accompanied ballad "In the End".

"Miss You" shares its title with a track on the previous Stranglers album Written in Red, but is a different song.

The album failed to reach the official UK Albums Chart, their first such release not to do so.

== Track listing ==
All tracks are written by the Stranglers

No.	Title	Length
1.	"God is Good"	4:03
2.	"You Don't Think That What You've Done is Wrong"	3:13
3.	"Tonight"	3:18
4.	"Jump Over My Shadow"	4:32
5.	"Miss You"	5:04
6.	"Coup de Grace (S-O-S)"	3:24
7.	"In the End"	3:14
8.	"No Reason"	5:16
9.	"Known Only unto God"	4:40
10.	"The Light"	5:59

Cat no/Label: EAGCD042/Eagle

== Personnel ==
The Stranglers

- Paul Roberts – vocals, production
- Jean-Jacques Burnel – bass, vocals (lead vocals on 2, 5, 7, 9), production
- John Ellis – guitar, production
- Dave Greenfield – keyboards, programming, vocals (lead vocals on 1), production
- Jet Black – drums, production

Additional musicians

- Lisa George – backing vocals (2)
- Lizzie Deane – backing vocals (2)

Technical

- David M. Allen – production, engineering, Pro Tools
- Chris Jarrett – engineering, programming
- Matt Hay – engineering
- Clare, Ben, Neil – engineering assistance
- Trevor Dawkins – technician
- Bruce Gooding – technician
- Stuart Green – packaging
