= Bazooka Joe (band) =

British pub rock band (1970–1977)

- Origin: London, England
- Genres: Pub rock; protopunk
- Years active: 1970–1977
- Past members: John Ellis; Danny Kleinman; Stuart Goddard; Arabella Weir; Dan Barson; Chris Duffy; Bill Smith; Robin Chaphekar; Mark Tanner; Pat Collier; Richard Cox; Kelli Cotter

Bazooka Joe or Bazooka Joe and the Lillets were a British pub rock band formed by John Ellis and Danny Kleinman in 1970. They featured bass player Stuart Goddard, who would later change his name to Adam Ant. Both Ellis and Goddard would go on to find success with The Vibrators and Adam and the Ants, respectively. Besides the later fame of their members, Bazooka Joe are primarily known as the band that headlined when the Sex Pistols played their first concert on 6 November 1975 at Central Saint Martins College of Art and Design. Ant has since recounted how he left the band directly due to a dispute over Sex Pistols' performance, which he was the only member of the band to have enjoyed.

The band's line-up was Danny Kleinman, Chris Duffy, Bill Smith, Robin Chaphekar and Mark Tanner. Another band member was Dan Barson. His brother (Mike Barson) gained fame as the keyboardist for Madness. Pat Collier was also in the group for a while before being replaced by Goddard. Collier joined Ellis in The Vibrators (eventually being replaced by another future Ant, Gary Tibbs) and later became a record producer for The Wonder Stuff and Katrina and the Waves. The comedian Arabella Weir was one of the "Lillets" or backing singers of the band.

Madness covered the Bazooka Joe song "Rockin' in A♭" on their debut album, One Step Beyond... which was written by Bazooka Joe's keyboard player, Willy "Wurlitzer" Smith.
