= Over (album) =

Studio album by Peter Hammill
- Released: April 1977
- Recorded: 27 June – 4 July 1976
- Studio: Foel Studio, Llanfair Caereinion; Rockfield Studios, Monmouthshire
- Genre: Art rock
- Length: 46:51
- Label: Charisma
- Producer: Peter Hammill

Peter Hammill chronology
Nadir's Big Chance (1975)	Over (1977)	The Future Now (1978)

Professional ratings
Review scores
Source	Rating
AllMusic	4.5/5 stars

Over is the sixth studio album by the English singer and songwriter Peter Hammill, released on Charisma Records in April 1977. It was issued for the first time on CD on Virgin Records in the early 1990s, and was reissued again in a remastered version in 2006 with bonus tracks.

The album details the break-up of a long-term relationship with a woman known as Alice. The album was originally to be called Over My Shoulder with a different cover shot in which Hammill was caught looking back over his shoulder with a very mixed expression.

The album was recorded during a period of line-up change for Hammill's band Van der Graaf Generator. It features drummer Guy Evans, future recruit Graham Smith (formerly of String Driven Thing) on violin, and the return of the band's bass player from 1969 to 1970, Nic Potter.

"This Side of the Looking Glass" was re-worked for Hammill's 1984 album The Love Songs.

== Track listing ==
All tracks are written by Peter Hammill.

Side one
No.	Title	Length
1.	"Crying Wolf"	5:13
2.	"Autumn"	4:18
3.	"Time Heals"	8:44
4.	"Alice (Letting Go)"	5:40
Total length:		23:55

Side two
No.	Title	Notes	Length
5.	"This Side of the Looking Glass"	Orchestra arranged by Michael Brand	6:57
6.	"Betrayed"		4:44
7.	"(On Tuesdays She Used To Do) Yoga"		3:55
8.	"Lost and Found"		7:11
Total length:			22:56

2006 CD reissue bonus tracks
No.	Title	Length
9.	"Betrayed" (recorded for the John Peel Show on BBC Radio 1)	4:44
10.	"Autumn" (recorded for the John Peel Show on BBC Radio 1)	4:14
11.	"This Side of the Looking Glass" (alternate take)	4:11

== Personnel ==
- Peter Hammill – vocals, acoustic and electric guitars (1, 4, 6–8), piano (1–3, 8), synthesizer (3, 7, 8), Hammond organ (1)
- Nic Potter – bass (1, 3, 8)
- Guy Evans – drums (1, 3, 8)
- Graham Smith – violin (2, 6)
- Michael Brand – orchestra conductor (5)

=== Technical ===
- Dave Anderson, Ian Gomm – recording engineers (Foel Studio, Llanfair Caereinion)
- Pat Moran – recording engineer, mixing (Rockfield Studios, Monmouthshire)
- Frank Sansom – art direction
- Sebastian Keep – photography
