= The Full English (album) =

Studio album by Judge Smith
- Released: 6 May 2005
- Recorded: October 2004 – March 2005
- Studio: Studio Judex, Sussex; and at locations in London and Utrecht, Netherlands
- Genre: Art rock
- Length: 54:24 plus an extra video-file of 10:44
- Label: LoL Productions s.n.c.
- Producer: Marco Olivotto

Judge Smith chronology
Curly's Airships (2000)	The Full English (2005)	Live in Italy 2005 (2006)

The Full English is the fourth solo album by Judge Smith. Because of the mainly acoustic instrumentation the album has an "unplugged" feel to it, and is one of the more accessible albums by Judge Smith. Three of the songs on The Full English had been released before, but were now re-recorded, "Carpet Tiles" and "Tell Me You Love Me" on Dome of Discovery (1994), and "It's The Silence That Kills You" as part of the songstory Curly's Airships (2000). Musically, the album is very diverse, incorporating Eastern European Gypsy-flavoured numbers, songs in the retro-rock tradition, narrative chansons, full-on café Tango, Reggae, and even Hip-Hop beats.

== Production ==
The Full English was recorded between October 2004 and March 2005, mainly in Smith's own recording studio in Sussex. Because Smith was invited by René van Commenée to give a lecture in Rotterdam on the subject of "Recording major projects with no money", he was able to record Van Commenée's drum and percussion playing in the Netherlands. Only when a considerable amount of recording had already been done, Marco Olivotto offered to mix and release the album, which was done at the Labour of Love studio in Rovereto, Italy, in March 2005.

== Release ==
The album was released 6 May 2005, the same day Van der Graaf Generator (a band co-founded by Judge Smith) did a reunion concert in the Royal Festival Hall in London. In the afternoon of that day Judge Smith did one of his scarce live-performances, in the Cobden Club in London. The same four musicians that appear on the album also performed the concert, and all songs from the album (and some more) were played.

== Cover art ==
The art work shows a full English breakfast, and the four musicians about to eat various parts of it.

== Track listing ==
All songs written by Judge Smith.

1. "Take It Away" – 5:00
2. "Carpet Tiles" – 5:30
3. "I Want Some of It" – 4:01
4. "Chris Does It Better" – 3:35
5. "Not Drowning But Waving" – 4:25
6. "Seemed Such A Nice Boy" – 4:52
7. "Advance The Spark" – 4:36
8. "Like A Rock" – 6:04
9. "Tell Me You Love Me" – 3:58
10. "We'll Always Have Paris" – 3:18
11. "It's The Silence That Kills You" – 3:20
12. "But Is It Art?" – 5:54

There is an extra, hidden video-track in avi-format on the CD.

13. "being judge(d)" – 10:44

== Personnel ==
- Judge Smith – voice
- John Ellis – guitar, bass
- Michael Ward-Bergeman – accordion, organ, piano
- René van Commenée – percussion
