= Michael Brand (composer) =

English orchestral conductor and composer

- Born: 1952 (age 72–73)
- Alma mater: University College, Oxford
- Occupation: Radio producer (1979–1982), conductor, music arranger, composer, councillor (1998–2001), councillor (2009–2013)
- Employer: BBC (1979–1982)

Michael Brand (born 1952) is an English orchestral conductor and composer, also known for his work with members of Van der Graaf Generator. He previously worked as a radio producer for the BBC.

== Early life ==
Brand was born in England in 1952, the son of the composer Geoffrey Brand. He was educated at Haberdashers' Aske's School, and read music at University College, Oxford, graduating in 1974.

After a stint as a freelance conductor and arranger, Brand worked as a producer for BBC Radio from 1979. During his BBC tenure, he produced BBC Radio 2 programmes, including those presented by David Hamilton, Brian Matthew, and Ray Moore. He left the BBC in 1982 to devote himself fully to his music.

== Composing ==
Many of his compositions are published by the firm of G & M Brand Publications, which he runs with his father, Geoffrey.

His Chosen Gems for Winds featured on a Naxos CD of music primarily by Percy Grainger, conducted by Bjarte Engeset.

Together with his wife Jane Bramwell he is a founder and director of the non-profit Oxford Music Theatre. He composed the musicals "King & Country" (2014; based on Allan Moorhouse's 1923 play The Conquering Hero) and "CLD: The Real Lewis Carroll" (2016; in which Lewis Carroll meets his alter ego Charles Lutwidge Dodgson), and "Guilty of Love" (2017; about Alan Turing), each with lyrics by Bramwell. The reviewer Tim Bano, writing in The Stage, said of "CLD": "Brand's music has a contemporary hymnal quality, the jaunty piano melodies of modern church music".

Music written or arranged by Brand has been broadcast on BBC Radio 3.

== Van der Graaf Generator ==
Peter Hammill of Van der Graaf Generator asked Brand to undertake the orchestral arrangement and conducting for his song "This Side of the Looking Glass", on his 1977 solo album Over. The orchestral track was retained when Hammill reworked the song for his album The Love Songs of 1984.

Brand also worked with former Van der Graaf Generator member Judge Smith. Smith provided the libretto for Brand's 1992 cantata Pioneer 10. and Brand wrote choral arrangements for Smith's album The Climber, released in 2000. Brand also orchestrated Smith's 1975 Requiem Mass, which was released on CD in 2016. Smith described Brand's role in creating the piece:

it was not until meeting Michael Brand, then a young music publisher and Brass arranger, that the piece entered the physical universe. Michael’s family publishing company was going to publish my other music, and, rather than pay me an advance on royalties, Michael, a highly talented and sympathetic musician, would transcribe my Requiem. In a laborious process, I sung the music to him, note by note and bar by bar. Utterly ignorant of any form of musical language, as I was at the time, this was all I could do to help him. Nonetheless, amazingly, it worked. We somehow created the orchestrations, and by 1975, the result was a complete manuscript score in pencil and paper.

== Personal life ==
Brand has twice served as an elected member of Buckinghamshire County Council, for the Liberal Democrats, representing the Amersham East ward from June 1998 (at a by-election following the death of the incumbent) to June 2001, and representing the Chesham North West ward from June 2009 to May 2013.

Brand's wife also served as a Liberal Democrat councillor. As of 2014, they were residents of Rottingdean.
