= The Stranglers =

English rock band

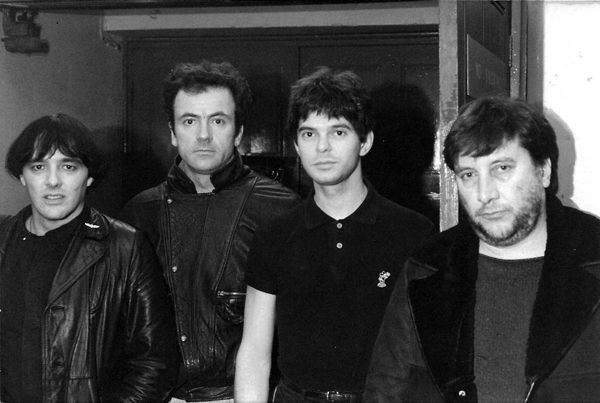
- The Stranglers' classic line-up in 1985; From left: Dave Greenfield, Hugh Cornwell, Jean-Jacques Burnel and Jet Black

Background information
- Also known as: The Guildford Stranglers (1974)
- Origin: Guildford, Surrey, England
- Genres: Punk rock; new wave; post-punk; art rock; pub rock
- Works: Discography
- Years active: 1974–present
- Labels: United Artists; A&M; Liberty; EMI; Epic; Parlophone; Stiff; Castle Communications
- Spinoffs: Soulsec
- Members: Jean-Jacques Burnel; Baz Warne; Jim Macaulay; Toby Hounsham
- Past members: Jet Black; Hugh Cornwell; Hans Wärmling; Dave Greenfield; John Ellis; Paul Roberts
- Website: thestranglers.co.uk

The Stranglers are an English rock band formed in Guildford, Surrey in 1974. The group's classic line-up, active from 1975 to 1990, consisted of guitarist and vocalist Hugh Cornwell, bassist and vocalist Jean-Jacques Burnel, keyboardist Dave Greenfield, and drummer Jet Black. Scoring 23 UK top 40 singles and 20 UK top 40 albums to date in a career spanning over five decades, the Stranglers are amongst the longest-surviving bands to have originated in the British punk scene.

Formed as the Guildford Stranglers in early 1974, they originally built a following within the mid-1970s pub rock scene. While their aggressive, no-compromise attitude had them identified by the media with the emerging punk rock scene that followed, their idiosyncratic approach rarely followed any single musical genre, and the group went on to explore a variety of musical styles, from new wave, art rock and gothic rock to the sophisti-pop of some of their 1980s output. They had major mainstream success with their 1982 single "Golden Brown". Their other hits include "Peaches", "No More Heroes", "Strange Little Girl", "Skin Deep" and "Always the Sun".

The Stranglers' early sound was driven by Burnel's heavy, melodic bass, but also gave prominence to Greenfield's keyboard playing. Their early music was also characterised by the growling vocals and sometimes misanthropic lyrics of both Cornwell and Burnel. Over time, their output gradually grew more refined and sophisticated. Summing up their contribution to popular music, critic Dave Thompson later wrote: "From bad-mannered yobs to purveyors of supreme pop delicacies, the group was responsible for music that may have been ugly and might have been crude – but it was never, ever boring."

They have experienced several line-up changes following Cornwell's departure in 1990. Black retired in 2018, while Greenfield died in 2020, leaving Burnel as the only original member still touring with the group.

== History ==
=== Formation and mainstream success (1974–1979) ===
Prior to forming the band, Jet Black (Brian Duffy) had run various businesses, including a fleet of ice cream vans, and later ran The Jackpot, a Guildford off-licence that would serve as the base for the early Stranglers. Black had also been a semi-professional drummer in the late 1950s and early 1960s. After attaining a degree of financial stability due to his business successes, by 1974 he decided to return to drumming and assemble a band. The Stranglers came to be an influential band in the British punk and new wave scene of the mid-1970s. Black drove the ice cream vans that would serve as the Stranglers' early tour buses.

The group that eventually formed between 1974 and 1975 was originally named The Guildford Stranglers, but they soon dropped the geographical prefix and the name, The Stranglers, was registered as a business on 11 September 1974 by Black. The other original personnel were bass player/vocalist Jean-Jacques Burnel, guitarist/vocalist Hugh Cornwell and keyboardist/guitarist Hans Wärmling, who was replaced by keyboardist Dave Greenfield within a year. None of the band came from the Guildford area apart from Burnel, who was originally from Notting Hill but moved to Godalming during his childhood. Black was from Ilford, Cornwell from Kentish Town and Greenfield from Brighton, while Wärmling came from Gothenburg and returned there after leaving the band.

Cornwell was a blues musician before forming the band and had briefly been a bandmate of Richard Thompson, Burnel had been a classical guitarist who had performed with symphony orchestras, Black's musical background was as a jazz drummer, and Greenfield had played at military bases in Germany. Their early influences included pre-punk psychedelic rock bands such as the Doors and the Music Machine.

From 1976, the Stranglers became associated with the burgeoning punk rock movement, due in part to their opening for the first British tours of American punks the Ramones and Patti Smith. Notwithstanding this association, some of the movement's champions in the British musical press viewed the band with suspicion on account of their age and musical virtuosity and the intellectual bent of some of their lyrics. However, Burnel was quoted saying, "I thought of myself as part of punk at the time because we were inhabiting the same flora and fauna ... I would like to think the Stranglers were more punk plus and then some."

The band's early albums, Rattus Norvegicus, No More Heroes and Black and White, all released within a period of 13 months, were highly successful with the record-buying public and singles such as "Peaches", "Something Better Change" and "No More Heroes" became instant punk classics. Meanwhile, the band received a mixed reception from some critics because of their apparent sexist and racist innuendo. However, critic Dave Thompson argued that such criticism was oblivious to the satire and irony in the band's music, writing: "the Stranglers themselves revelled in an almost Monty Python-esque grasp of absurdity (and, in particular, the absurdities of modern 'men's talk')." These albums went on to build a strong fan-following, but the group's confrontational attitude towards the press was increasingly problematic and triggered a severe backlash when Burnel, a martial arts enthusiast, punched music journalist Jon Savage during a promotional event.

In February 1978, the Stranglers began a mini-tour, playing three secret pub gigs as a thank-you to those venues and their landlords for their support during the band's rise to success. The first was at The Duke of Lancaster in New Barnet on Valentine's Day, with further performances at The Red Cow, Hammersmith, and The Nashville Rooms, West Kensington, in early September.

During their appearance at the University of Surrey on the BBC TV programme Rock Goes to College, on 11 October 1978, and aired on the 19 October, the group walked off stage because an agreement to make tickets available to non-university students had not been honoured.

In the latter half of the 1970s, the Stranglers toured Japan twice, joining the alternative music scene of Tokyo, which was evolving from the punk sound of Kyoto-based band Murahachibu (村八分, Ostracism), whose music influence spread to Tokyo in 1971. The Stranglers were the only foreign band to take part in a landmark scene focused around S-KEN Studio in Roppongi and The Loft venues in Shinjuku and Shimokitazawa from 1977 to 1979. The scene included bands such as Friction, and they became friends with the band Red Lizard, whom they invited back to London, where the band became known as Lizard. In 1979, while still in Japan, Burnel also became close friends with Keith, co-founder and drummer for ARB. At the end of 1983, ARB's bassist was imprisoned, leaving the band with a problem for their forthcoming tour. Burnel took time out from the Stranglers to fly out to Japan at short notice and join ARB to cover the tour, including appearing at the All Japan Rock Festival at Hibaya park, becoming the first non-Japanese to ever appear at the festival. Burnel toured with ARB for five weeks and played on two studio tracks, "Yellow Blood" and "Fight it Out", both of which appeared on the RCA Victor ARB album Yellow Blood.

=== Second phase (1979–1982) ===
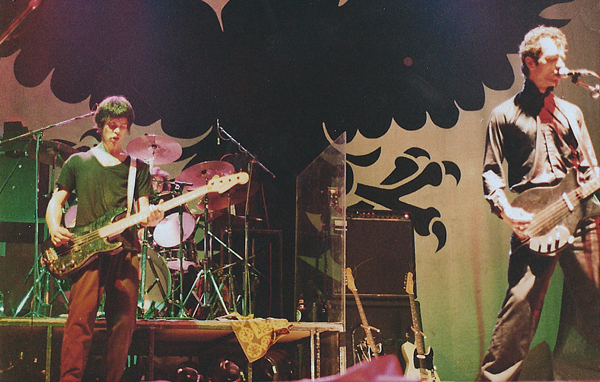
The Stranglers performing in France on The Raven tour, 1979

In 1979, one of the Stranglers' two managers advised them to break up as he felt that the band had lost direction, but this idea was dismissed and they parted company with their management team. Meanwhile, Burnel released an experimental solo album Euroman Cometh backed by a small UK tour and Cornwell recorded the album Nosferatu in collaboration with Robert Williams. Later that year the Stranglers released The Raven, which had a more melodic and complex sound. The songs on The Raven are multi-layered and musically complicated, and deal with such subjects as a Viking's lonely voyage, heroin addiction, genetic engineering, contemporary political events in Iran and Australia and extraterrestrial visitors, "Meninblack". The Hohner Cembalet, which saw prominent use on the previous three albums, was dropped and Oberheim synthesizers used instead whilst acoustic piano was used on "Don't Bring Harry". A harmoniser was used to treat Burnel's vocal on the track "Meninblack", the recording of which led to Martin Rushent, who had produced their earlier albums, walking out, leaving the band to co-produce the album themselves with Alan Winstanley.

We're never going to use a producer again. They are just shitty little parasites. All they're good for is telling jokes. And we know better jokes than any of 'em.

— Hugh Cornwell, NME – November 1979

The Raven was not released in the US; instead a compilation album The Stranglers IV was released in 1980, containing a selection of tracks from The Raven and a mix of earlier and later non-album tracks. The Raven sold well, reaching No. 4 in the UK Albums Chart - it spawned one top 20 single, "Duchess", with "Nuclear Device" reaching No. 36 and the EP "Don't Bring Harry" reaching No. 41. This was followed by a non-album single, "Bear Cage", backed with "Shah Shah a Go Go" from The Raven. A 12-inch single, the band's first, containing extended mixes of both tracks was also released; "Bear Cage" was No. 36 in the chart.

Following the success of the Stranglers' previous four albums they were given complete freedom for their next, The Gospel According to the Meninblack, a concept album exploring religion and the connection between religious phenomena and extraterrestrial visitors. It was preceded by a single "Who Wants the World", which did not appear on the album, and just made the top 40. The album also included "Waltzinblack" which became adopted as a theme by TV chef Keith Floyd. The Gospel According to The Meninblack was different from their earlier work and alienated many fans. It peaked on the UK Albums Chart at No. 8, their lowest placing to date, and in 1981 was widely considered an artistic and commercial failure. The track "Two Sunspots" had been recorded during the Black And White sessions in 1978, but was shelved until 1980 when it was rediscovered and placed on The Gospel According to the Meninblack. The "Meninblack" track from The Raven is the "Two Sunspots" soundtrack slowed down.

La Folie (1981) was another concept album, this time exploring the subject of love. At first La Folie charted lower than any other Stranglers studio album, and the first single taken from it, "Let Me Introduce You to the Family", only charted at No. 42. However, the next single was "Golden Brown". The song is an evocative waltz-time ballad, with an extra beat in the fourth bar. Cornwell said the lyrics were "about heroin and also about a girl. She was of Mediterranean origin and her skin was golden brown." It became their biggest hit, charting at No. 2 in the UK Singles Chart. It was also named as "record of the week" on BBC Radio 2, despite the station not previously playing music associated with the punk genre. It remains a radio staple to this day. Following this success, La Folie recharted at No. 11 in the UK Albums Chart. "Tramp" was originally thought to be the ideal follow-up single to "Golden Brown" but "La Folie" was chosen after Burnel convinced his bandmates of its potential. Sung in French, it received negligible airplay and charted at No. 47. Shortly afterwards the Stranglers left EMI. As part of their severance deal, the Stranglers were forced to release a greatest hits collection, The Collection 1977–1982. The track listing for The Collection 1977–1982 included the new single "Strange Little Girl", which had originally been recorded on a demo in 1974 and rejected by EMI. It became a hit, charting at No. 7 in July 1982 and providing royalties to Wärmling through his co-writing credit.

=== New label and sound (1983–1990) ===
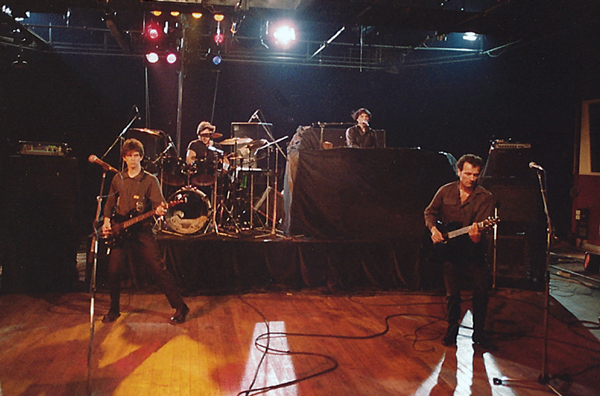
The Stranglers during the recording of French TV show "L'Echo des Bananes" in September 1983

Following the Stranglers' return to commercial success, many record companies lined up to sign them. Virgin Records was the most likely choice but Epic Records made a last minute offer and secured the Stranglers' services. The Stranglers once again had complete artistic freedom and in 1983 released their first album for Epic, Feline, which included the UK No. 9 hit "European Female". The album was another change in musical direction, this time influenced by European music. It was the first Stranglers album to feature acoustic guitars, and it was on this album that Jet Black began to use electronic drum kits. Hugh Cornwell stated, "On La Folie there were three tracks – 'Golden Brown' ... 'La Folie' and 'How to Find True Love and Happiness in the Present Day' – that sort of pointed us away from what we had been doing. It was strange doing those tracks, because we'd never really attempted that quite minimalistic recording technique. And when we started writing for Feline, things were coming out the same way." The album reached No. 4 in the UK chart in January 1983.

1984 saw the release of Aural Sculpture which consolidated the band's success in Europe and established them in Oceania. It included the UK No. 15 hit "Skin Deep" (which also reached No. 11 in Australia, No. 19 in New Zealand and Top 30 in the Netherlands). This was their first album to feature the three-piece horn-section which was retained in all their subsequent albums and live performances until Cornwell's departure in 1990. Aural Sculpture peaked at No. 14 in the UK Albums Chart in November 1984.

Their 1986 album, Dreamtime, dealt with environmental concerns among other issues. Its signature track, and another radio staple for many years to come, was "Always the Sun" (a No. 15 hit in France and No. 16 hit in Ireland, No. 21 in Australia, No. 30 in the UK and No. 42 in the Netherlands). The only Stranglers album to chart in the US, Dreamtime was a moderate hit in the UK, reaching No. 16 in November 1986.

The Stranglers' final album with Cornwell, 10, was released in 1990. This was recorded with the intention of building on their "cult" status in America. Following the success of their cover of The Kinks' "All Day and All of the Night", a UK No. 7 hit in 1988, the Stranglers released another cover of a 1960s track, "96 Tears" as their first single from 10; it reached No. 17 in the UK. The follow-up single "Sweet Smell of Success" only reached No. 65. "Man of the Earth", which the band had high hopes for, was due to be the third single from the album, but Epic Records decided against it. In August 1990, Hugh Cornwell left Stranglers to pursue a solo career, following the band's failure to secure a tour in the US. In his autobiography, Cornwell stated that he felt that the Stranglers were a spent force creatively and cited various examples of his increasingly acrimonious relationship with his fellow band-members, particularly Burnel. Feelings were mutual; when Cornwell phoned Jet Black to say he was leaving the band, the drummer's response was blunt "OK, fine".

=== Post-Cornwell era (1990s) ===
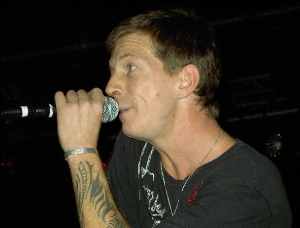
Paul Roberts performing in 2004, Roberts replaced Hugh Cornwell in 1990

Following the departure of Cornwell, CBS-Sony dropped the Stranglers from its roster. The remaining members recruited John Ellis, who had had a long-standing association with the band. He had opened for them in the 1970s as a member of The Vibrators, filled in for Cornwell during his time in prison for drug possession in 1980, worked with Burnel and Greenfield in their side-project Purple Helmets and been added to the Stranglers' line-up as a touring guitarist a short time before Cornwell's departure. Burnel and Ellis briefly took over vocal duties (for one television appearance on The Word) before enlisting Paul Roberts, who sang on most songs live, even those originally sung by Burnel.

This line-up recorded four albums: Stranglers in the Night (1992), About Time (1995), Written in Red (1997) and Coup de Grace (1998).

=== 2000s resurgence and reversion to a four-piece ===
In 2000, Ellis left the band and a new guitarist, Baz Warne, was recruited.

The Stranglers achieved something of a critical and popular renaissance in 2004 with the album Norfolk Coast and a subsequent sell-out tour, together with their first UK Top 40 hit (No. 31) in 14 years, "Big Thing Coming". The album also included Tuckers Grave about a Somerset cider house named after the victim of a suicide in a nearby farm which members of the band now occupied. In 2005, Coast to Coast: Live on Tour was released; the live album contained songs recorded during their tour the previous year. On their UK tour they were supported by Goldblade.

In May 2006, Roberts left the band and the Stranglers were now back to a four-piece line-up: Burnel, Black, Greenfield and Warne, with the lead vocals shared between Warne and Burnel. In concert, Burnel returned to singing the songs he originally recorded as lead vocalist and Warne sang the numbers originally led by Hugh Cornwell.

Suite XVI, the follow-up album to Norfolk Coast, was released in September 2006 (the title is a pun on "Sweet 16" and also a reference to the fact that it was the band's sixteenth studio album) and continued the band's resurgence. Although partly a return to the band's heavier punk roots, the album featured a typically idiosyncratic mixture of musical styles which included a country and western style Johnny Cash pastiche/homage "I Hate You".

In 2007 it was reported that drummer Black was suffering from atrial fibrillation, an ailment which subsequently forced him to miss several shows, particularly where extended travel was required. On such occasions Ian Barnard, Black's drum technician, deputised.

On 4 November 2007, the band (with Black) played a sell-out gig at the Roundhouse in Camden, North London, marking the 30th anniversary of their headline run at the same venue in 1977. The set list was the same as the 1977 concert, with the addition of a couple of more recent songs as a final encore. The event is recorded on the DVD Rattus at the Roundhouse.

=== 2010–present ===
The Stranglers started 2010 with an extensive UK tour, including a sold-out return to the Hammersmith Apollo in March, their first visit there since 1987. They were supported on the 16-date UK tour by Max Raptor.

A double CD compilation album, Decades Apart, containing a selection of tracks from the full career of the band, including at least one from each of their 16 studio albums and two new tracks, "Retro Rockets" and "I Don't See the World Like You Do", was released in February 2010. The download version of Decades Apart included an unreleased recording from 1978, "Wasting Time", inspired by the band's Rock Goes To College experience earlier that year; this track, originally titled "Social Secs", was never released, and the music ended up being reversed and released as "Yellowcake UF6", the B-side to "Nuclear Device" in 1979.

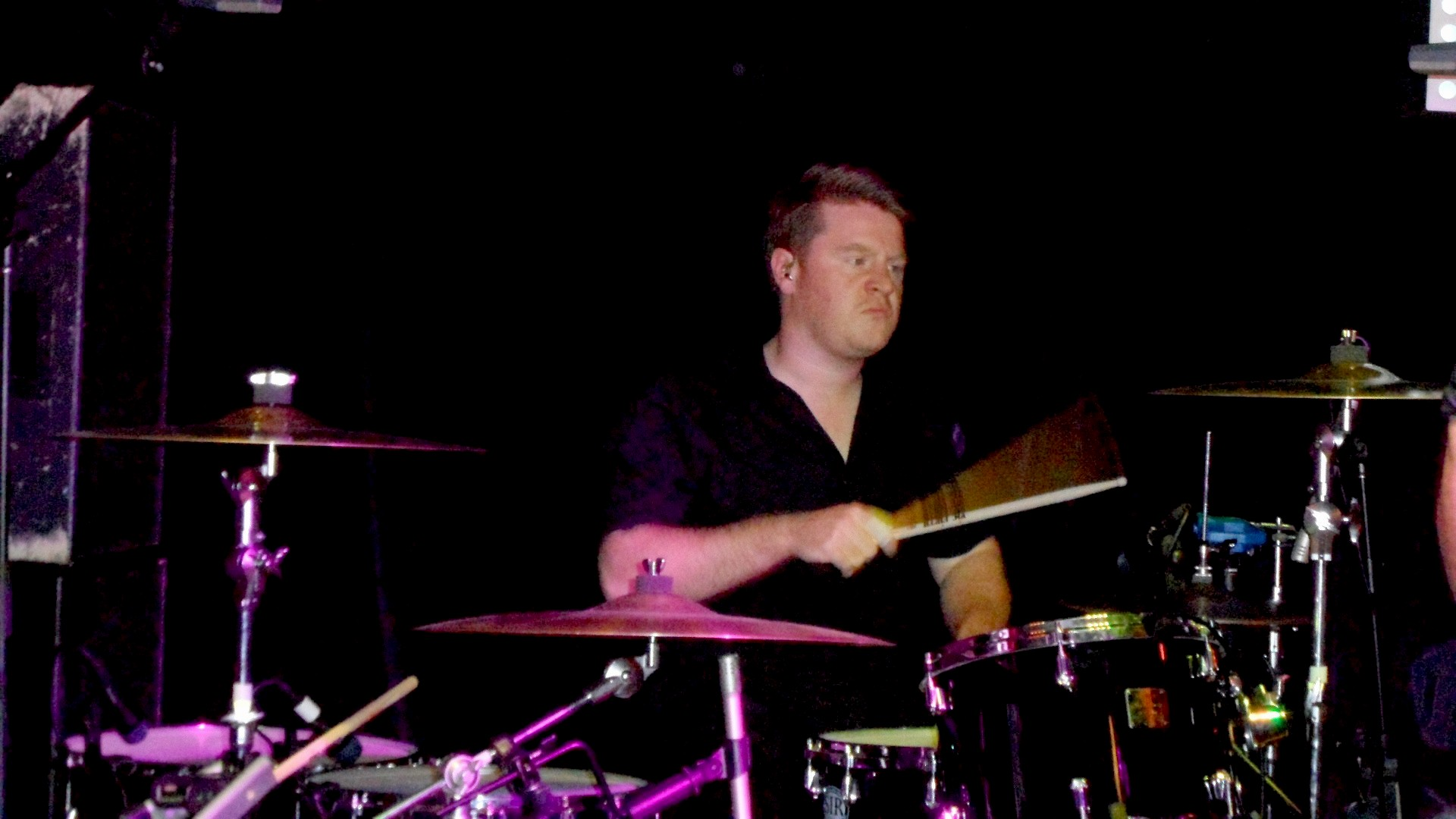
Jim Macaulay, then the band's touring drummer before Black's retirement, in 2013

Across the summer of 2010 the band played a number of festivals, including Weyfest and Glastonbury and T in the Park in the UK, Oxegen 2010 in Ireland and concerts in Japan, Greece, Poland, Slovakia and Bulgaria. The band also released a new live album and DVD, recorded at the Hammersmith Apollo in May 2010. In March 2011, the band completed another UK tour. Burnel's long-term friend Wilko Johnson was invited to bring The Wilko Johnson band on the tour. In April, the band began touring Europe, with many gigs and major festivals lined up for the entire year.

On 23 September 2012, the band returned to Looe, Cornwall, fronted by Warne and Burnel. The band had originally spent time in Looe writing Suite XVI.

Giants was released in 2012. The "deluxe" version consisted of a second disc containing tracks from the Weekend in Black acoustic session in November 2011.

2013 saw the band play a full UK tour, with Black playing the second half at most gigs (Jim Macaulay taking the first half). Several festivals were booked for 2013, including a session at the BBC Proms on 12 August. For the North American tour Black was not present, with Macaulay playing the entire show.

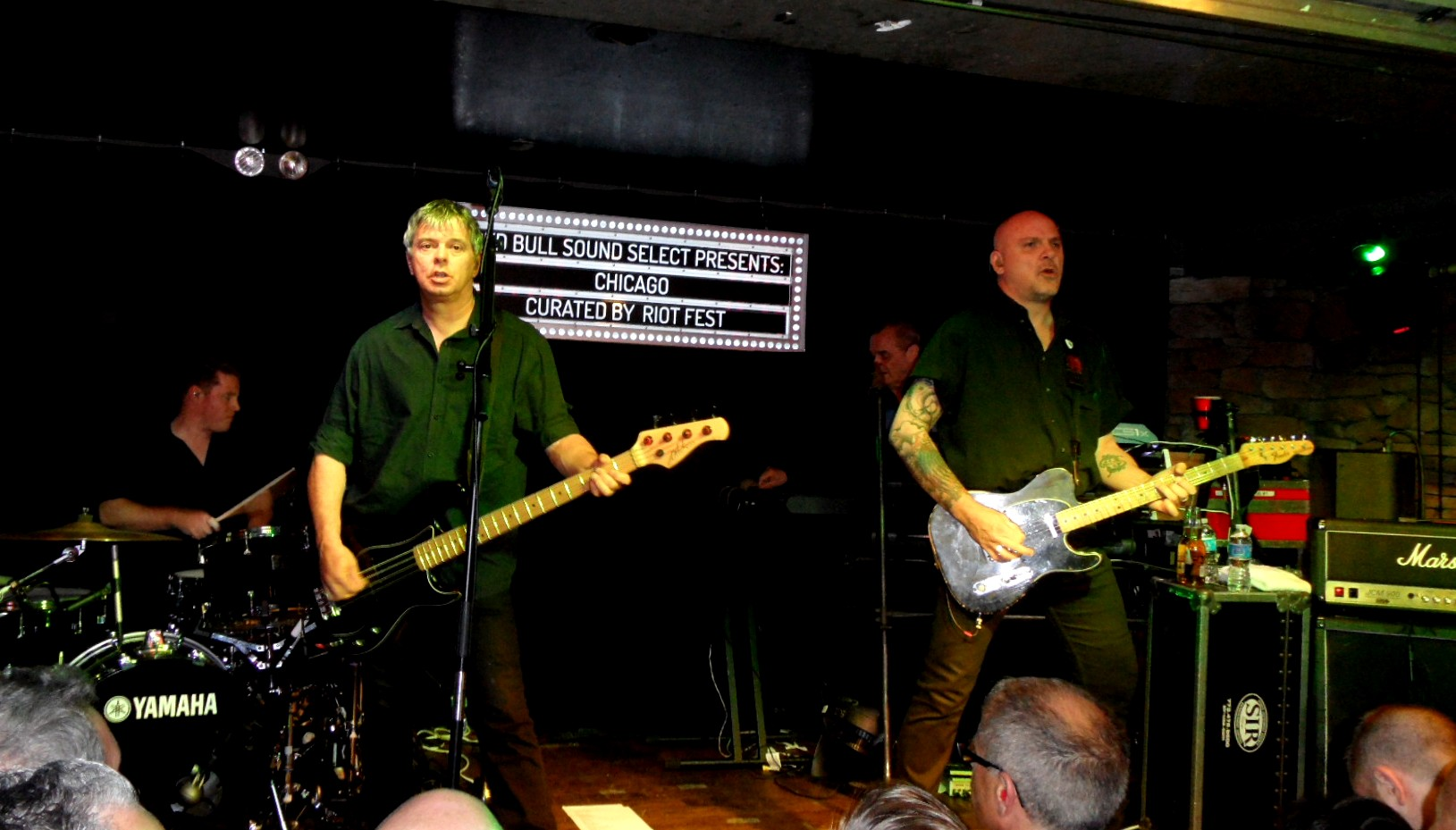
The band performing in Chicago in 2013

In 2014, the band celebrated its 40th birthday with a Ruby Tour, throughout the UK and Europe. In 2015, the March On tour had 18 dates around the United Kingdom. Where stage space allowed, a second drum kit was set up and Jet Black appeared for a set of four songs. A proposed gig in Moscow was announced and then cancelled due to visa difficulties, but a mini-tour of the UK took place in July. The band then played gigs throughout Europe, ending in November. In April 2016, they returned to New Zealand and Australia. In November 2016, the band performed in Tel Aviv, Israel. In an interview before the concert, bassist Jean-Jacques Burnel described Israel as the only democracy in this part of the world.

Black ceased performing on stage with the band after some partial-set appearances in March 2015, although he remained an official member of the band until his retirement in 2018. Jim Macaulay appeared in a promotional photograph alongside Burnel, Greenfield and Warne for the first time in 2016 and has since been named as an official member of the group.

In August 2017, the Stranglers performed at an outdoor concert in Hull as part of the UK City of Culture celebrations. In July 2018, the band played at the LUNAR festival in Tanworth-in-Arden.

Greenfield died on 3 May 2020, at the age of 71. He had contracted COVID-19 while in hospital for a heart ailment. The band's 18th studio album, Dark Matters, features contributions from Greenfield and is also their first release following the retirement of Black. It was released on 10 September 2021, and entered the UK Albums Chart at number 4, the highest position since Feline in 1983 and their first top 10 position since 1990.

In November 2021, the band began what was billed as their last full tour with their new keyboard player, Toby Hounsham, who played with Rialto, an English rock band formed in London in 1997, and subsequently Mungo Jerry for live and studio work since the early 2000s.

After many years of health problems, Black died on 6 December 2022 at the age of 84.

Although the band had billed their 2021 dates as their final UK tour, they continued to tour Europe in 2023. For 2024, a 50th Anniversary Tour included dates in the UK and Europe, and 2025 found the band touring Europe, the UK, Australia and New Zealand.

== Legacy ==
"No More Heroes" was featured in the first episode of the BBC fantasy crime drama series Ashes to Ashes and in the third episode of the second season of the American TV show Queer as Folk. The title was used for the 2007 video game No More Heroes, created by Japanese designer Goichi Suda, who is also a fan of the band. Despite the name, the cost of licensing the track prevented the song from appearing in the game. A cover version by Violent Femmes was used for the film Mystery Men.

The song "Let me Down Easy" was used as the opening credits theme for Hardcore Henry. "Peaches" appeared in the title sequence of Sexy Beast by director Jonathan Glazer and was used as the closing theme for many of Keith Floyd's cooking programmes, with the instrumental track 'Waltzinblack' providing the title music.

"Golden Brown" featured in Guy Ritchie's film Snatch (2000), was used extensively in the Australian film He Died with a Felafel in His Hand. It also featured in the Black Mirror episode "Metalhead" and in Season 2 of The Umbrella Academy.

More songs by the Stranglers have been licensed for use in commercials than from any other punk band. "Always The Sun" was used for a TV and radio campaign by insurance company Sun Alliance in 1992 and 1993. "Peaches" has appeared on adverts for Adidas, HSBC, Tesco and JBL speakers while "Waltzinblack" has been used for Vodafone and the Carphone Warehouse. In 2002 "Hanging Around", a track from the 1977 debut album Rattus Norvegicus which was never released as a single, was used in several French Wonderbra commercials featuring model Inna Zobova. "Golden Brown" was used to advertise Ore-Ida french fries and later used in Waitrose's 2008 Christmas campaign.

Tori Amos covered "Strange Little Girl" on her 2001 Strange Little Girls album.

== Members ==
=== Current members ===
- Jean-Jacques Burnel – bass, lead vocals (1974–present)
- Baz Warne – guitar, backing vocals (2000–present), lead vocals (2006–present)
- Jim Macaulay – drums, percussion, backing vocals (2018–present; touring substitute for Jet Black 2012–2018)
- Toby Hounsham – keyboards, backing vocals (2021–present)

=== Former members ===
- Jet Black – drums, percussion (1974–2018; semi-retired from touring 2007–2018; died 2022)
- Hugh Cornwell – lead vocals, guitar (1974–1990)
- Hans Wärmling – keyboards, backing vocals, guitar (1974–1975; died 1995)
- Dave Greenfield – keyboards, backing and occasional lead vocals (1975–2020; died 2020)
- John Ellis – guitar, backing vocals (1990–2000)
- Paul Roberts – lead vocals, percussion (1990–2006)

==== Former touring musicians ====
- Ian Barnard – drums, percussion (2007–2012; substitute for Jet Black)

(In the late 1980s, the Stranglers regularly featured a three-piece brass section in their live line-up.)

== Discography ==
Studio albums

- Rattus Norvegicus (1977)
- No More Heroes (1977)
- Black and White (1978)
- The Raven (1979)
- The Gospel According to the Meninblack (1981)
- La Folie (1981)
- Feline (1983)
- Aural Sculpture (1984)
- Dreamtime (1986)
- 10 (1990)
- Stranglers in the Night (1992)
- About Time (1995)
- Written in Red (1997)
- Coup de Grace (1998)
- Norfolk Coast (2004)
- Suite XVI (2006)
- Giants (2012)
- Dark Matters (2021)

== Sources ==
- Cornwell, Hugh; Drury, Jim (2001). The Stranglers: Song by Song. Sanctuary Publishing Ltd. ISBN 1-86074-362-5.
- Buckley, David (1997). No Mercy: The Authorised and Uncensored Biography of The Stranglers. London: Hodder & Stoughton. ISBN 978-0-340-68062-9.
