= Curly's Airships =

Studio album by Judge Smith
- Released: 5 October 2000
- Recorded: 1994–2000; Masters of Art Studio, Sussex; The Organ Workshop, Lymm, Cheshire and on location in England, France & Holland
- Genres: Art rock, songstory
- Length: 143:56
- Label: Masters Of Art

Judge Smith chronology
Dome of Discovery (1993)	Curly's Airships (2000)	The Full English (2005)

Professional ratings
Review scores
Source	Rating
AllMusic	4/5 stars
New Horizons	(not rated)
No Warning	(not rated)

Curly's Airships is a double CD by Judge Smith, released in October 2000. Smith regards the album as a new form of narrative rock music, which he calls "songstory". Curly's Airships tells about the R101 airship, crashing in France during its maiden overseas voyage in 1930. Amongst many others, Peter Hammill, Hugh Banton, Arthur Brown, David Jackson, John Ellis and Pete Brown perform on the project.

Smith believes that the 2 hr 20 min work might be one of the largest and most ambitious single piece of rock music ever recorded.

== Production ==
Smith worked on the project for many years, between 1993 and its release in 2000. The writing alone took two years. Smith was able to finance the project thanks to a small grant from the National Lottery, distributed by the Arts Council in a scheme called A4E, Arts For Everyone. A part of the recording was done in the Cathedral of Saint Pierre in Beauvais, the city near the R101 disaster, where Hugh Banton played the organ. Another part was recorded in Cardington parish church, which was the local church for the Airship Works, and yet another part was recorded inside the (extremely large) R101's shed at Cardington. Mixing and mastering of the album, by David Lord, took almost a year to complete.

== Release ==
On HTV, 10 July 1997, a documentary about the project was shown in the arts series Frieze Frame. The film contains parts where Lene Lovich can be seen, playing Marthe, Princess Bibesco, who was Lord Thomson's lover. However, Lene Lovich/Marthe Bibesco does not perform in the "songstory".

The release of Curly's Airships on 5 October 2000 coincided with the 70th anniversary of the R101 disaster of 1930. On exactly the same point where the original airship crossed the English coast on its maiden voyage to India in 1930, some of the creators of Curly's Airships launched two model airships on their way to France, each one carrying a voucher for a free copy of the album.

== Themes ==
Musically, Curly's Airships embraces rock, jazz, tango, Indian music and eerie atmospherics, with repeated passages identifying key characters' appearances. Basically, the line-up is vocals, guitars, organs, bass and drums, with some saxophone touches. There is no rhyme and no regular metre, and the vocal lines of many sections are single, non-repeating tunes. This sets Curly's Airships musically apart from many "regular" rock or rock opera albums.

As for its subject matter, Curly's Airships sketches images of post-WW1 bravery, obedience and stupidity, resulting in the disaster. The events are seen through the eyes of Curly McLeod, a fictional aviator. Almost all other persons and events though are based on reality, like Lord Thomson, whose part is performed by Peter Hammill. The libretto (a 44-page booklet) contains many 1920s slang words.

== Cover art ==
The cover art was done by Glide Design of Eastbourne. The front cover shows a picture of Smith as Curly McLeod on fire in period airship officers' uniform. The double CD contains two booklets, one of 44 pages with the libretto, and one of 48 pages with essays, photos of all musicians in their persona, a glossary and bibliography.

== Track listing ==
The track listing for Curly's Airships comprises twenty-six songs, divided into fifteen chapters.

=== Disc One ===
Chapter One: Curly Comes Through

1. "Voices From A Crystal Set"
2. "Walking Her Out"

Chapter Two: Curly's Conducted Tour

3. "Curly Takes Us Up"
4. "Drifting About Like a Bad Smell"

Chapter Three: Curly In The Clouds

5. "Curly In The Clouds"

Chapter Four: Catastrophe

6. "A Capital Idea"
7. "A Shrieking Of Aluminium"

Chapter Five: Curly On Civvy Street

8. "Curly On Civvy Street"

Chapter Six: A Great British Compromise

9. "That Imperial Airship Scheme"
10. "From The Sidelines"

Chapter Seven: A Kindly Sort Of Cove

11. "A Kindly Sort Of Cove"

Chapter Eight: Curly At Cardington

12. "Curly At Cardington"

Chapter Nine: Lord Of A Continent

13. "A Creature Of Grace"
14. "A Byronic Sort Of Blighter"

=== Disc Two ===
Chapter Ten: Big Chief And Some Minor Bugs

1. "Big Chief And Some Minor Bugs"

Chapter Eleven: Curly's Close Shave

2. "The Canadian Run"
3. "Conan Doyle & The Flying Sieve"
4. "Horrors At Hendon"

Chapter Twelve: Cutting The Lady In Half

5. "As Safe As A House"
6. "A Ship Of Fools"

Chapter Thirteen: Curly Gets The Creeps

7. "The Night Before"
8. "The Morning After"

Chapter Fourteen: Curly Cashes His Chips

9. "Bedford To Hastings"
10. "Hastings To Beauvais"

Chapter Fifteen: Carry On Curly

11. "The Muffled Drum"
12. "The Final Taboo"

== Personnel ==
- Judge Smith – vocals and bass & drum tracks
- John Ellis – electric guitars & EBow, mandolin
- Hugh Banton – organs & piano
- Pete Brown – percussion & vocals
- Rikki Patten – supplementary guitar
- David Jackson – saxophones & whistle
- Joe Hinchliff – accordion
- Ian Fordham – bass guitar & double bass
- René van Commenée – tabla, ghatam & tambura
- Tammo Heikens – sitar & tambura
- David Shaw-Parker – acoustic guitar, banjo, vocals & actor
- Arthur Brown – vocals
- Peter Hammill – vocals
- Paul Roberts – vocals
- Paul Thompson – vocals
- Nick Lucas – vocals & actor
- Gwendolyn Gray – actress
- Mike Bell – actor
- The Mystery Marching Band
