= Michel Tcherevkoff =

Michel Tcherevkoff is a commercial photographer. Working as the creative eye for important clients, Tcherevkoff has created a dress made from toothbrushes for Johnson & Johnson, a massive "sensorium" where visitors could experience fragrance visually for Firmenich, morphed a salad spinner into an amusement park ride for Bed Bath and Beyond.

From collaborating with the world's greatest creatives to successfully launching his own publishing and global licensing initiatives, Tcherevkoff's photography fuses imaging, digital illustration, sculpture and pure art with experience and talent.

Born and educated in Paris, Tcherevkoff came to America to visit his sister, who was a fashion model, and decided to stay. With a signature style that defined shapes and bold color, he played with perspective through in-camera effects and outside camera rigging. Tcherevkoff attracted the attention of an established agent and became successful immediately.

In 2008, Tcherevkoff conceptualized and created the book, Shoe Fleur: A Footwear Fantasy, with introduction by Diane Von Furstenberg, preface by Ferruccio Ferragamo published by Welcome Books.

Sculpting and designing footwear from fresh flowers, Tcherevkoff introduced his first collection of accessories in a debut book launch and exhibition at the Museum of Arts and Design in New York during Fashion Week. Shoe Fleur images continue to be exhibited in galleries and museums worldwide.

He is designing two other collections of similar attire: one of lingerie, called "Passion Flower" crafted and created from fresh flowers that expresses the sensual fantasies of today's woman, and one of hats, "Chapeau de Fleur".

The recipient of over 25 international awards for creative imagery, Tcherevkoff has had many gallery and museum exhibitions worldwide. His popular seminar/workshop "Reality with a Twist: Living Your Life in Technicolor" takes students on a creative journey. He is also a Canon Explorer of Light and Print Master.

Tcherevkoff is increasingly involved in product branding collaborations worldwide.
