= Baz Warne =

English musician

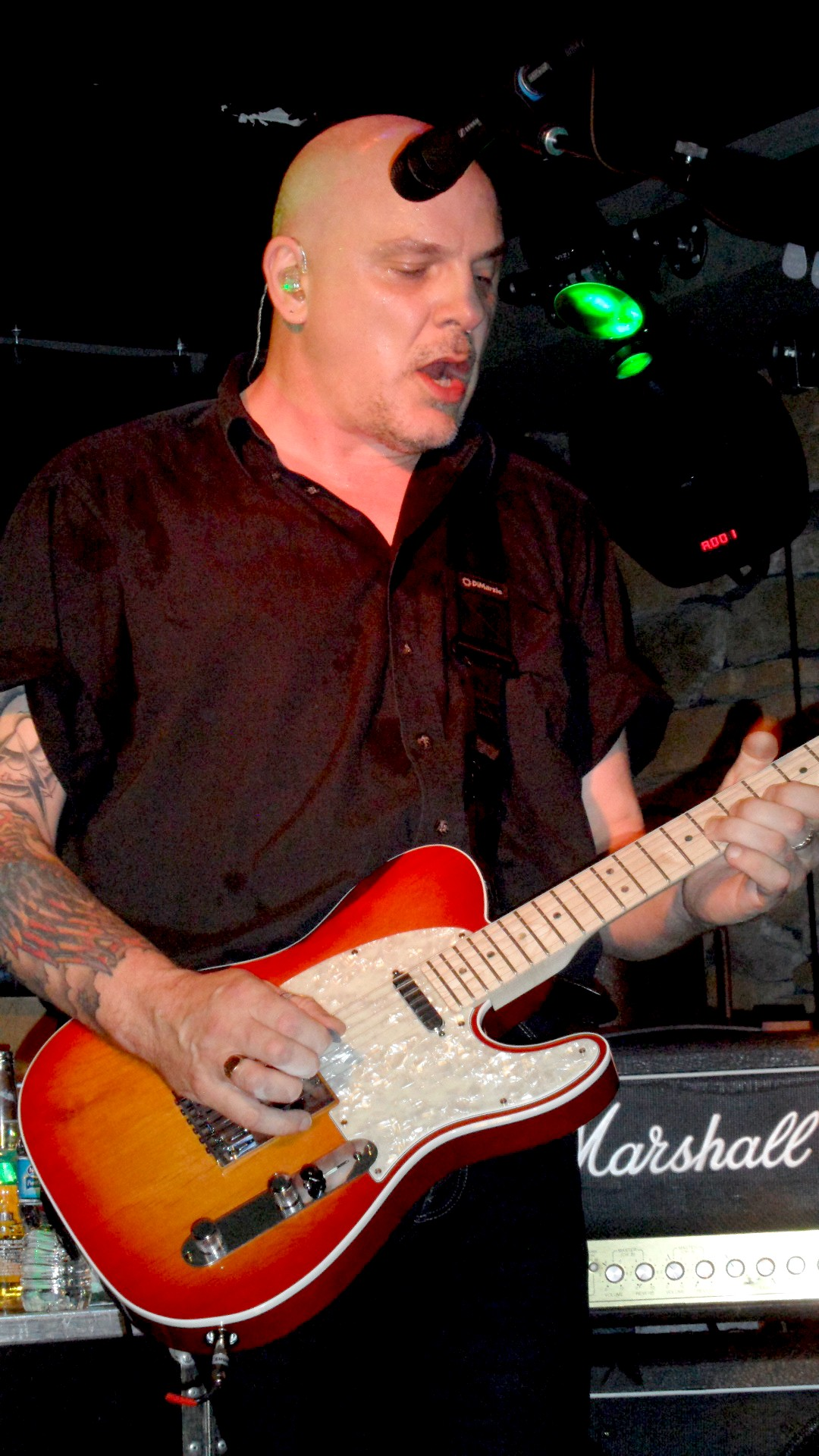
- With the Stranglers, Chicago 2013

Background information
- Born: 25 March 1964 (age 62); Sunderland, England
- Genres: Punk rock, new wave
- Occupations: Musician, songwriter, producer
- Instruments: Vocals, guitar, bass
- Years active: 1983–present
- Labels: Columbia, Legacy Recordings
- Member of: The Stranglers
- Formerly of: Toy Dolls

Barry Warne (born 25 March 1964) is an English musician, best known as the current guitarist and vocalist of The Stranglers.

Earlier in his career, he was the guitarist and frontman of numerous bands. His first recordings to be released were with the Sunderland punk band Toy Dolls, whom he joined as bassist in 1983. He toured extensively with them and recorded two singles before forming the Troubleshooters in 1985. The Troubleshooters released two singles before changing their name to the Smalltown Heroes in 1992. They released a number of singles including the world's first interactive CD-rom single, "Moral Judgement", which contained the band's history, the video for "Moral Judgement", and gig footage. "Moral Judgement" received the 'Single-of-the-Week' designation from Kerrang magazine on its release in 1994. It was followed in 1996 by their only album, Human Soup. In 1998, during the recording of what was planned as their second album, Atomic Cafe, their record company pulled the plug, announcing that they had no more money, causing the band to fold. In the summer of 1998, Warne formed a retro-rock cover band named Sun Devils.

In 2000, Warne was invited to audition for the Stranglers, whom he had met in 1995 when Smalltown Heroes supported them on tour. His audition was successful, and he immediately set off to play in Kosovo and then across Europe with the band. One of their first gigs together was captured on the 2002 Euro Live DVD, recorded in Poland in 2000.

He is also well known in the small Northumberland village of Belford, where he played many solo gigs at the Salmon Inn around the time he joined the Stranglers.

Warne sings lead vocals on many of the tracks contained on the Stranglers' most recent studio albums (Suite XVI, Giants and Dark Matters). In live gigs, he handles the vocals on the songs that had originally been sung by Hugh Cornwell. His first gig as a lead vocalist with the band was 3 June 2006 at the Hutton Moor Leisure Centre, Weston-super-Mare, England.

In October 2017, Warne played guitar for the track "21st Century Love" which features on fellow North East singer/songwriter Scott Michael Cavagan's debut album.

In 2020, Warne formed the side-project Wingmen with bassist Paul Gray (the Damned), guitarist Leigh Heggarty (Ruts DC), and drummer Marty Love (Johnny Moped). The band released their self-titled debut album in 2023.

In 2022, Warne featured as the main narrator for the short film, Passing Ships, which also starred Sunderland born actress, Melanie Hill, to raise awareness of mental health issues and male suicide.

== Discography ==
The following list includes albums only. Warnes' full discography, including track listings, singles and EPs, can be found here.

=== Stranglers studio albums ===
- Norfolk Coast (2004)
- Suite XVI (2006)
- Giants (2012)
- Dark Matters (2021)

=== Stranglers other albums ===
- 5 Live 01 (2001)
- Laid Black - acoustic album (2002)
- Coast to Coast: Live on Tour (2005)
- Rattus at the Roundhouse (DVD) (2007)
- Themeninblackinbrugge - Live Acoustic Album (2008)
- Live at the Apollo 2010 (DVD & CD) (2010)

=== Baz Warne ===
- Common Thread (2002)

=== Sun Devils ===
- Sun Devils (2001)

=== Smalltown Heroes ===
- Human Soup (1996)

=== Wingmen ===
- Wingmen (2023) (Cadiz Music)
