= Paul Roberts (musician) =

English singer (born 1959)

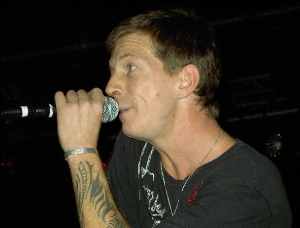
- Paul Roberts on stage with The Stranglers at Nottingham in 2005

Background information
- Born: Paul Roberts; 31 December 1959 (age 66)
- Origin: Chiswick, London England
- Genres: Punk rock; pop punk; new wave
- Occupations: Musician; actor
- Instruments: Vocals; percussion
- Years active: 1980s–present
- Label: None
- Member of: Soulsec
- Formerly of: The Stranglers

Paul Roberts (born 31 December 1959 in Chiswick, London) is an English singer who was the lead singer of The Stranglers between 1990 and 2006.

== Career ==
=== The Stranglers ===
Roberts replaced Hugh Cornwell in The Stranglers in 1990 and appeared on and co-wrote their studio albums Stranglers In the Night, About Time, Written in Red, Coup de Grace and Norfolk Coast.

For live performances, he appeared as the frontman, with John Ellis and later Baz Warne playing guitar to replace Cornwell, who had performed as lead vocalist and guitarist.

Roberts left The Stranglers after almost 16 years (believed to be longer than his predecessor, according to press quotes from his former colleagues) in May 2006. The split was officially described as "amicable". The band reverted to a four-piece, with Warne taking over lead vocals and Jean-Jacques Burnel returning to singing songs on which he had originally provided lead vocals.

=== Solo / Faith Band / Soulsec ===
As a side project to The Stranglers, Roberts also played and recorded solo, as Paul Roberts and The Faith Band, The Faith Band, and Soulsec. Releases included the albums Faith? (Paul Roberts, 1999), Self Discovery (Paul Roberts and The Faith Band, 2001), The Pressure Sensitive (The Faith Band, 2003) and End Games (Soulsec, 2007).

=== Other work ===
In 1994 Roberts sang on The Listening Pool's (ex-OMD members Paul Humphreys, Martin Cooper and Malcolm Holmes) album Still Life on the track "Somebody Somewhere". Roberts played the role of Pop Larkin in the world premiere of Perfick: The Darling Buds of May Musical. This was a musical based on H. E. Bates' novel The Darling Buds of May, written by David Burton. The show ran for a week in April 2008 at The Kings Theatre, Southsea as a trial to see whether the company could raise enough interest to finance a West End production. The show did not open on the West End.

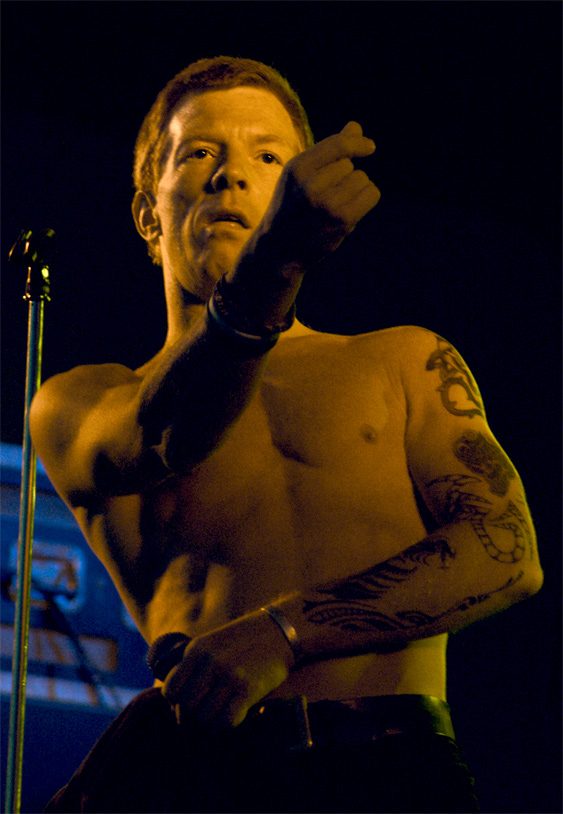
Paul Roberts performing in 2005.

In 2008, Roberts played the Roman poet Ovid in the play The Art of Love alongside Adèle Anderson of Fascinating Aïda in London, the lead role in Richard O'Brien's Mephistopheles Smith: the Evangelist from Hell at the Edinburgh Festival Fringe in 2007, 16 characters in a two-hour workshop of The Unimportant History of Britain in London in 2008. Also in 2008, Roberts was asked by Paul Nicholas to play John Barsad in a new musical adaptation of A Tale of Two Cities at the Gatehouse Theatre, London, and was offered the lead in Gold, a fringe musical based on old school friends getting their school band back together after twenty-five years apart.

Roberts has appeared in the television series Cranford as a featured character alongside Dame Judi Dench and Eileen Atkins and has collaborated with actor Stephen Donald (Blood Brothers, Brookside) in the north of England. Paul appears at the beginning of the first Harry Potter film.

In 2010, Roberts performed as Frank Sinatra alongside Laura Nixon's Marilyn Monroe and Suspiciously Elvis at sell-out shows at Alive & Swinging in Brighton, United Kingdom.

In 2016, after the initial filming of a 'joke' Bowie stage show [after a lifetime of constant comparison] Roberts was subsequently asked to co-create the show Let's Dance with Worldwide Entertainment, paying tribute to David Bowie. The show has played dates across the United Kingdom, in Kuala Lumpur, Malaysia and in Singapore, presented by the British Theatre Playhouse.
