= Norfolk Coast (album) =

Studio album by the Stranglers
- Released: 16 February 2004
- Studio: Good Luck Studios, London
- Genre: Rock
- Length: 40:03
- Label: EMI Liberty
- Producer: Mark Wallis; David Ruffy; Peter Glenister

The Stranglers chronology
| Coup de Grace (1998) | Norfolk Coast (2004) | Suite XVI (2006) |

Singles from Norfolk Coast
- 1. "Big Thing Coming" Released: February 2004; 2. "Long Black Veil" Released: April 2004

Professional ratings
Review scores
| Source | Rating |
|---|---|
| AllMusic | 3.5/5 stars |
| BBC Music | (favourable) |
| Encyclopedia of Popular Music | 3/5 stars |
| Uncut | 2/5 stars |

Norfolk Coast is the fifteenth studio album by the Stranglers, and was released on 16 February 2004 by EMI's Liberty Records label, making it their first new album recorded for the company in 23 years. It was released six years after their last studio album Coup de Grace and was their first official studio album with new guitarist Baz Warne, and also the last album to feature Paul Roberts on lead vocals. Norfolk Coast peaked at No. 70 in the UK Albums Chart in February, for one week's duration in that listing.

The album was well received by reviewers and fans alike, showing a return to form for the band. It also spawned the band's first UK Top 40 hit single for more than a decade, "Big Thing Coming" (No. 31 in February 2004 in the UK Singles Chart), and a smaller Top 75 hit "Long Black Veil".

== Background ==
After four albums in the 1990s where the Stranglers struggled commercially, and with a growing inter-band conflict that left bassist Jean-Jacques Burnel's enthusiasm for the band at an all-time low, Burnel decided to step up and regain control of the band. On 1998's Coup de Grace, he had already had a greater writing input than on the previous albums. "At one point we were a bit lost, direction wise, and musically," Burnel said in 2014. "I hadn't contributed much and suddenly I had this revival of interest."

In 1999, Burnel retreated to the secluded Norfolk village of Holme-next-the-Sea, bringing along his guitars and recording equipment, looking for inspiration to write songs. "My marriage was falling apart, the Stranglers were going around in ever-decreasing circles, I wasn’t quite sure what was happening in my life," he said. Inspired by the beautiful coastline, the seclusion, and what was going on in his head at that time, "I just wrote a body of work which we used in the Norfolk Coast album." The title track and "Big Thing Coming" were the first two songs he wrote for the album, in what he described as a "creative frenzy". Burnel spent just over three months in Norfolk, and has stated that it turned everything around for him and the Stranglers.

Guitarist John Ellis left the band in 2000 and was replaced by Baz Warne in April the same year. The songwriting partnership of Burnel and Warne started two months after Warne had joined the band. They kept writing and working on songs for the album until 2002–2003, and then the band started recording the album in Mark Wallis' Good Luck Studios in London. The band made the decision to play every song live before recording it, which meant that they were in the studio for very little time, according to Burnel. Although some songs were co-writes, many songs were mainly individual efforts. In addition to "Norfolk Coast" and "Big Thing Coming", Burnel also wrote "Lost Control", and Warne contributed "Long Black Veil", "Dutch Moon", "Into the Fire" and "I've Been Wild", the latter written specifically about Burnel, in the first person and from his point of view. Paul Roberts wrote "Mine All Mine" on his own, his sole songwriting contribution to the album.

The album saw the re-emergence of some of the Stranglers' signature sounds, such as Dave Greenfield's swirling keyboards, in a contemporary setting. The hard-edged title track sets the direction for much of the album, while there are more contemplative moments, such as the atmospheric "Tucker's Grave", a West Country cider house named after local farm worker Edwin Tucker, who committed suicide in 1747. In 1999, the band's manager Sil Willcox bought the farm house in which Tucker died, Charlton Farm, which would house the band's rehearsal and recording studios.

Norfolk Coast was also the name of a short film starring Jean Jacques Burnel, which premiered in March 2006. It is available on the 2006 DVD On Stage on Screen and features rearranged music from the album. Directed by Robin Bextor and co-starring Susannah York, the film won a number of awards.

== Album cover ==
The cover photograph was taken on Hunstanton Beach in Norfolk in the summer of 2003 by American music photographer Harrison Funk.

== Track listing ==
All tracks are written by the Stranglers, except where noted.

| No. | Title | Length |
|---|---|---|
| 1. | "Norfolk Coast" | 3:44 |
| 2. | "Big Thing Coming" | 3:01 |
| 3. | "Long Black Veil" | 4:01 |
| 4. | "I've Been Wild" | 2:43 |
| 5. | "Dutch Moon" | 3:57 |
| 6. | "Lost Control" | 3:29 |
| 7. | "Into the Fire" | 4:12 |
| 8. | "Tucker's Grave" | 5:58 |
| 9. | "I Don't Agree" | 3:21 |
| 10. | "Sanfte Kuss" | 2:23 |
| 11. | "Mine All Mine" | 3:11 |

Canadian CD bonus track

| No. | Title | Writer(s) | Length |
|---|---|---|---|
| 12. | "Peaches 2004" | Hugh Cornwell, Jean-Jacques Burnel, Dave Greenfield, Jet Black | 3:52 |

Japanese CD bonus track

| No. | Title | Writer(s) | Length |
|---|---|---|---|
| 12. | "Cruel Garden" (Laid Black version) | Cornwell, Burnel, Greenfield, Black | 2:01 |

- "Peaches 2004" is taken from the "Big Thing Coming" single. "Cruel Garden" is taken from Laid Black, an album of acoustic re-workings, which was issued by the band as a mail order-only release in 2001.

== Personnel ==
The Stranglers

- Paul Roberts – lead vocals, percussion
- Jean-Jacques Burnel – bass, vocals
- Baz Warne – guitar, vocals
- Dave Greenfield – keyboards, vocals
- Jet Black – drums, percussion

Additional musicians

- Jon Sevink – violin solo (track 10)

Technical

- Mark Wallis – production, engineering, programming
- David Ruffy – production (except track 1), engineering, programming
- Peter Glenister – production (track 1)
- Steve Proctor – additional programming
- Louie Nicastro – pre-production engineering
- Max Bisgrove – pre-production engineering
- Harrison Funk – photography
- Darren Evans – design

Bonus tracks

- Mark Wallis – production, engineering ("Peaches 2004")
- Peter Glenister – production, engineering ("Peaches 2004")
- Max Bisgrove – production, engineering, mixing ("Cruel Garden")

== Charts ==
Chart performance for Norfolk Coast
| Chart (2004) | Peak position |
|---|---|
| French Albums (SNEP) | 142 |
| UK Albums (OCC) | 70 |
