= The Margin (album) =

Live album by Peter Hammill
- Released: Feb 1985
- Recorded: December 1983
- Genre: Art rock
- Length: 81:46
- Label: Foundry
- Producer: Peter Hammill

Peter Hammill chronology
The Love Songs (1984)	The Margin (1985)	Skin (1986)

Professional ratings
Review scores
Source	Rating
Allmusic	2.5/5 stars
New Musical Express	(admirable)

The Margin is a live album by Peter Hammill, documenting early 1980s concerts by his K Group. Hammill used the alias K (on vocals, piano and guitar), Nic Potter was Mozart (on bass guitar), Guy Evans was Brain (on drums), and John Ellis was Fury (on backing vocals and guitar). The album was originally released as a double album on Foundry Records in 1985. It was reissued later on CD on Virgin Records in the UK with one track missing in order to make it fit onto a single CD and on Line Records in Germany with two tracks missing. Hammill then reissued it again on his own Fie! record label, as The Margin +. This issue did not restore the track lost from the UK CD edition from the original vinyl release, "The Second Hand", but included an additional disc of material previously released as a live bootleg called The Secret Asteroid Jungle. The liner notes explain that Hammill chose to include a different performance of "The Second Hand".

The original album (and the first disc of The Margin +) is a live-recording without audience sounds ("No applause, no overdubs — This is what happened on stage"), the additional disc of The Margin + does have audience sounds ("Applause, no overdubs — This is what happened out front").

The album cover is a stark black-and-white photograph of Hammill by the noted Dutch photographer Anton Corbijn. It has become an iconic image of Hammill, often used for live posters and other promotional material.

== Track listing ==
=== The Margin ===
Side one
No.	Title	Length
1.	"The Future Now"	3:46
2.	"Porton Down"	5:38
3.	"Stranger Still"	6:22
4.	"Sign"	6:36
Total length:		22:22

Side two
No.	Title	Notes	Length
5.	"The Jargon King"		3:15
6.	"The Second Hand"	Omitted on CD releases	5:57
7.	"Empress's Clothes"		5:49
8.	"The Sphinx In The Face"		5:12
Total length:			20:13

Side three
No.	Title	Length
9.	"Labour Of Love"	5:48
10.	"Sitting Targets"	5:44
11.	"Patient"	7:28
Total length:		19:00

Side four
No.	Title	Length
12.	"Flight"	20:35

=== + ===
No.	Title	Length
1.	"The Second Hand"	6:03
2.	"My Experience"	4:13
3.	"Paradox Drive"	4:18
4.	"Modern"	7:40
5.	"Film Noir"	5:06
6.	"The Great Experiment"	5:47
7.	"Happy Hour"	9:46
8.	"Central Hotel"	5:01
9.	"Again"	4:24
10.	"If I Could"	5:52
Total length:		58:10

== Personnel ==
The K Group

- Peter Hammill - vocals, guitar, piano
- John Ellis - lead guitar and backing vocals
- Nic Potter - bass guitar
- Guy Evans - drums, percussion
