= John Ellis (guitarist) =

English guitarist and songwriter (born 1952)

- Born: 1 June 1952 (age 74); Kentish Town, London, England
- Genres: Alternative rock; punk rock
- Occupations: Songwriter; musician
- Instrument: Guitar
- Years active: 1970–present

John Ellis (born 1 June 1952) is an English guitarist and songwriter.

== Career ==
Ellis was a co-founder of the pub rock band Bazooka Joe in 1970 and a founding member of the punk rock band The Vibrators. He formed The Vibrators in 1976 while still at art school studying illustration. The Vibrators released two albums with Ellis and toured extensively. Ellis left the Vibrators in 1978 to form the short-lived group Rapid Eye Movement, before embarking on a solo career in 1979, releasing a couple of singles, one of which, "Babies in Jars" (a live Rapid Eye Movement recording) reached #34 on the UK Indie Chart.

In 1980, Ellis toured with Peter Gabriel on his "Tour of China 1984", and he appears on the album Peter Gabriel 4. From 1982 onwards, he recorded a number of albums with Peter Hammill, and toured with Hammill (off and on) from 1981 until 1989. From 1981 until 1984, he was a member of the K Group with Peter Hammill. Hammill was "K" (on vocals, piano and guitar), Nic Potter was "Mozart" (on bass guitar), Guy Evans was "Brain" (on drums), and Ellis was "Fury" (on backing vocals and guitar). The Peter Hammill album The Margin is a registration of live-concerts by the K group.

From 1988 to 1989, Ellis was a member of The Purple Helmets, a five-piece R&B group playing cover versions from the 1960s. The band included Jean Jacques Burnel and Dave Greenfield of The Stranglers, and Ellis subsequently joined the Stranglers from late 1990 to 2000, starting with the album Stranglers in the Night. During that period he also created music for European Art exhibitions and several short films. Ellis left the Stranglers in 2000. He is an exponent of the E-bow guitar.

Ellis has contributed to the recordings of Judge Smith, a founding member of Van der Graaf Generator.

In 2005, Ellis formed a community organisation called 'The Luma Group', which delivers arts based training and workshops.

In 2009, Ellis started his record label, Chanoyu Records, in order to release his music. The first release was Wabi Sabi 21©, an album of electronic instrumentals inspired by the Japanese Tea Ceremony.

== Discography ==
=== Solo ===
- Microgroove (year unknown)
- In Rhodt (Gallery Music #1) (1989)
- Das Geheimnis Des Golem (Gallery Music #2) (1991)
- Destination Everywhere (Gallery Music #3) (1995)
- Our Internal Monologue (Gallery Music #4) (1995)
- Shock of Contact (Gallery Music #5) (1996)
- Acrylic (1997)
- Spic 'N' Span (1999)
- Map of Limbo (2008) (a free album available at Clinical Archives)
- Wabi Sabi 21© (2009)
- Sly Guitar (2013)

=== As band member ===
With The Vibrators:

- Pure Mania (1977)
- V2 (1978)
- VGuilty (1983)
- Alaska 127 (1984)
- Past, Present and Into the Future (2017)

With The Purple Helmets:

- Ride Again (1988)
- Rise Again (1989)

With The Stranglers:

- Stranglers in the Night (1992)
- About Time (1995)
- Written in Red (1997)
- Coup de Grace (1998)

With The Vibrators & Chris Spedding:

- Mars Casino (2019)

=== Collaborations ===
With Adam Ant:

- Dirk Live at the Apollo live DVD (bonus performance at the 100 Club) (2015, filmed 2014)

With Cult With No Name

- Above as Below (2012)
- Another Landing (2013)

With Peter Gabriel:

- Peter Gabriel 4 (1982)

With Peter Hammill:

- Enter K (1982)
- Patience (1983)
- The Love Songs (1984)
- The Margin (live, 1985)
- Out of Water (1990) (Ellis also painted the picture on the cover)
- Fireships (1992)
- The Noise (1993)

With Nic Potter:

- Mountain Music (1983)
- New Europe-Rainbow Colours (1992)

With Judge Smith:

- Curly's Airships (2000)
- The Full English (2005)
- Live in Italy 2005 (live, DVD, 2006)
- The Light of the World (two-song CD single, 2007, as The Tribal Elders)
- Orfeas (2011)
