= The Fall and Rise of Hugh Cornwell =

Compilation album by Hugh Cornwell
- Released: 28 August 2015
- Recorded: 1988–2008
- Genre: Rock
- Length: 53:47 (CD); 49:22 (Vinyl)
- Label: Invisible Hands Music
- Producer: Laurie Latham; Liam Watson; Gary Langan; Hugh Cornwell; Ian Ritchie; Danny Kadar; Tony Visconti

Hugh Cornwell chronology
Live at the Vera (2014)	The Fall and Rise of Hugh Cornwell (2015)	This Time It's Personal (with John Cooper Clarke) (2016)

The Fall and Rise of Hugh Cornwell is a compilation album by English musician Hugh Cornwell, released on 28 August 2015 by Invisible Hands Music on both CD and vinyl.

It is Cornwell's first ever anthology of his post-Stranglers solo career, collecting 12 tracks from his first six solo albums (two tracks from each) plus a new studio recording of the live favourite "Live It and Breathe It" (CD and digital only). Due to time limitation of the vinyl version, tracks from Cornwell's 2012 album Totem and Taboo were omitted on all formats.

== Critical reception ==
Professional ratings
Review scores
Source	Rating
AllMusic	4/5 stars
Classic Rock	3.5/5 stars
Goldmine	3.5/5 stars
Ox-Fanzine	3.5/5 stars
Record Collector	4/5 stars

David Jeffries of AllMusic wrote that the collection "subscribes to the "leave them wanting more" theory, as it whets the appetite instead of fully satisfying." Jeffries would have liked it to include more tracks, "but brevity is the thing here," he wrote, "and this tight, no-filler track list packs quite the punch."

Tim Peacock of Record Collector felt that the album's contents "vividly reveal that [Cornwell] remains a creative force to be reckoned with." He wrote: "Mired in glossy 80s production values, the selections from Wolf have, admittedly, dated, but the hooky, bittersweet "Under Her Spell," the mellow, poetic "Cadiz" and the No More Heroes-esque punch of Hooverdam highlight "Please Don't Put Me on a Slow Boat to Trowbridge" all serve notice that Cornwell's post-Stranglers oeuvre ought to be regarded with considerably more respect."

Goldmine magazine's Patrick Prince felt that the only time the compilation "slips and falls" is when it "temporarily embarks into the slick area of MTV-ish '80s" in songs like "Break of Dawn" and "First Bus to Babylon." Otherwise, he was positive, writing, ""Under Her Spell" is a wonderful Syd Barrett-type sing-a-long to a '60s Who beat; "Please Don't Put Me on a Slow Boat to Trowbridge" is close to the pop aggression that made the Jam unique in their day; and "Lay Back on Me Pal" has a nice case of its own Britpop ... but it's all Hugh Cornwell."

== Track listing ==
All tracks are written by Hugh Cornwell

No.	Title	Original release	Length
1.	"Leave Me Alone"	Hi Fi, 2000	3:29
2.	"Beat of My Heart"	Hooverdam, 2008	3:40
3.	"Hot Cat on a Tin Roof"	Wired, 1993	4:10
4.	"Break of Dawn"	Wolf, 1988	4:28
5.	"Under Her Spell"	Beyond Elysian Fields, 2004	3:14
6.	"First Bus to Babylon"	Wired	3:59
7.	"Please Don't Put Me on a Slow Boat to Trowbridge"	Hooverdam	3:15
8.	"Lay Back on Me Pal"	Hi Fi	3:37
9.	"One Burning Desire"	Guilty, 1997	4:42
10.	"Cadiz"	Beyond Elysian Fields	4:13
11.	"Long Dead Train"	Guilty	5:10
12.	"Getting Involved"	Wolf	5:22
13.	"Live It and Breathe It" (CD and digital only)	New track	4:25

== Personnel ==
See individual albums for full personnel credits.

- Laurie Latham – producer (1, 8, 9, 11)
- Liam Watson – producer (2, 7)
- Gary Langan – producer (3, 6)
- Hugh Cornwell – producer (4, 12), artwork concept
- Ian Ritchie – producer (4, 12)
- Danny Kadar – producer (5, 10)
- Tony Visconti – producer (5, 10)
- Miles Showell – mastering (at Abbey Road Studios)
- Sara-Jane Morley – design
- Charles Kennedy – liner notes
