= People, Places, Pieces =

Live album by Hugh Cornwell
- Released: October 2006
- Recorded: 12–14 April 2005
- Venue: The London Carling Academy
- Genre: Rock
- Length: 180:29
- Label: Invisible Hands Music

Hugh Cornwell chronology
Beyond Elysian Fields (2004)	People, Places, Pieces (2006)	Beyond Acoustic Fields (2007)

Alternative cover
- Dirty Dozen album cover

People, Places, Pieces is a 3-CD live album by English musician Hugh Cornwell, released through Invisible Hands Music in October 2006. It was recorded at the London Carling Academy over three nights between 12 and 14 April 2005. Containing 45 tracks, the set spans the whole of Cornwell's career and includes tracks from his time with the Stranglers and from the majority of his solo albums. It was available by mail-order only, and accompanied by a 12-track "highlights" CD entitled Dirty Dozen, which was available in stores.

"Live It and Breathe It" (track 14 on disc 3) was played live for a number of years before Cornwell finally recorded a studio version of the song for his 2015 compilation album The Fall and Rise of Hugh Cornwell.

== Background ==
When asked in 2006 why he had released the live album, Cornwell said, "I have not had a live recording out for some time. ... I have been playing in a trio now with Winston McGilvray who plays drums and Steve Lawrence who is the bassist for a good five years now. We have played together for so long without any changes in the line-up that I thought that that in itself was a good reason for making a recording." When Cornwell and his band had three consecutive nights at the London Carling Academy at the end of a tour, they decided to do the live recording there. Cornwell: "We could get three completely different sets recorded and, as I have played with those guys for so many years, we were able to expand on the number of song titles and to add on a lot more songs from both the Stranglers catalogue and my own catalogue than those we already had been playing on the other dates of the tour."

Talking about why People, Places, Pieces was only being made available through mail order, whereas Dirty Dozen was available in record shops, Cornwell explained, "It is very difficult to get a shop chain to stock a triple live album, but we were able to get a single one in."

== Track listing ==
All tracks are written by Hugh Cornwell, except where noted.

Disc 1 ("People")
No.	Title	Writer(s)	Length
1.	"No More Heroes"	Cornwell, Jean-Jacques Burnel, Dave Greenfield, Jet Black	3:40
2.	"Snapper"		3:18
3.	"Bring on the Nubiles"	Cornwell, Burnel, Greenfield, Black	2:19
4.	"Miss Teazy Weezy"		3:10
5.	"Tramp"	Cornwell, Burnel, Greenfield, Black	3:26
6.	"Do Right Bayou"		4:25
7.	"Hanging Around"	Cornwell, Burnel, Greenfield, Black	4:10
8.	"The Story of Harry Power"		4:02
9.	"Duchess"	Cornwell, Burnel, Greenfield, Black	2:35
10.	"Henry Moore"		6:06
11.	"Black Hair Black Eyes Black Suit"		4:12
12.	"Nuclear Device"	Cornwell, Burnel, Greenfield, Black	3:40
13.	"Mothra"	Cornwell, Robert Williams	2:24
14.	"Irate Caterpillar"	Cornwell, Williams	4:32
15.	"I Feel Like a Wog"	Cornwell, Burnel, Greenfield, Black	7:22

Disc 2 ("Places")
No.	Title	Writer(s)	Length
1.	"Nice 'n' Sleazy"	Cornwell, Burnel, Greenfield, Black	3:23
2.	"First Bus to Babylon"		4:00
3.	"Spain"	Cornwell, Burnel, Greenfield, Black	3:31
4.	"Torture Garden"		5:30
5.	"Dead Loss Angeles"	Cornwell, Burnel, Greenfield, Black	3:09
6.	"Cadiz"		4:01
7.	"Shakin' Like a Leaf"	Cornwell, Burnel, Greenfield, Black	2:45
8.	"Beauty on the Beach"		3:35
9.	"Peaches"	Cornwell, Burnel, Greenfield, Black	4:17
10.	"Land of a Thousand Kisses"		4:58
11.	"Sweden"	Cornwell, Burnel, Greenfield, Black	3:08
12.	"Dark Side of the Room"		4:23
13.	"Goodbye Toulouse"	Cornwell, Burnel, Greenfield, Black	2:58
14.	"Putting You in the Shade"		2:09
15.	"Down in the Sewer"	Cornwell, Burnel, Greenfield, Black	9:10

Disc 3 ("Pieces")
No.	Title	Writer(s)	Length
1.	"Tank"	Cornwell, Burnel, Greenfield, Black	2:55
2.	"Leave Me Alone"		3:16
3.	"Something Better Change"	Cornwell, Burnel, Greenfield, Black	3:40
4.	"Nerves of Steel"		4:57
5.	"Baroque Bordello"	Cornwell, Burnel, Greenfield, Black	3:44
6.	"Picked Up by the Wind"		3:05
7.	"Grip"	Cornwell, Burnel, Greenfield, Black	3:52
8.	"24/7"		3:34
9.	"Out of My Mind"	Cornwell, Burnel, Greenfield, Black	3:41
10.	"Under Her Spell"		2:54
11.	"Always the Sun"	Cornwell, Burnel, Greenfield, Black	4:20
12.	"I Don't Mind"		3:10
13.	"Long Dead Train"		4:40
14.	"Live It and Breathe It"		4:55
15.	"Walk On By"	Burt Bacharach, Hal David	7:28

== Dirty Dozen track listing ==
All tracks are written by Hugh Cornwell, except where noted.

No.	Title	Writer(s)	Length
1.	"Duchess"	Cornwell, Burnel, Greenfield, Black	2:32
2.	"First Bus to Babylon"		3:57
3.	"Goodbye Toulouse"	Cornwell, Burnel, Greenfield, Black	2:58
4.	"Picked Up by the Wind"		2:58
5.	"Hanging Around"	Cornwell, Burnel, Greenfield, Black	4:05
6.	"Black Hair Black Eyes Black Suit"		4:10
7.	"Always the Sun"	Cornwell, Burnel, Greenfield, Black	4:20
8.	"Nerves of Steel"		4:57
9.	"Nuclear Device"	Cornwell, Burnel, Greenfield, Black	3:38
10.	"Putting You in the Shade"		2:09
11.	"Walk On By"	Bacharach, David	7:04
12.	"No More Heroes"	Cornwell, Burnel, Greenfield, Black	4:02

== Personnel ==
Credits adapted from the album liner notes.

Musicians

- Hugh Cornwell – lead vocals, electric and acoustic guitar
- Steve Lawrence – bass, backing vocals, lead vocals on "Something Better Change"
- Windsor McGilvray – drums, percussion, backing vocals, lead vocals on "Irate Caterpillar"

Technical

- Chris Goulstone – engineer, mixing, mastering
- Hugh Cornwell – box design concept, sleeve concept (Dirty Dozen)
- John Clube – design
- Anthony Robins – front cover photograph (Dirty Dozen)
- Julian Lowry – back cover image (Dirty Dozen)
- Keith Curtis – photographs (Dirty Dozen)
