= Mayday (Hugh Cornwell album) =

Live album by Hugh Cornwell
- Released: 1999 (internet download)
- Recorded: May 1, 1998
- Venue: Sankeys, Manchester
- Genre: Post-punk
- Label: HIS Records; Track Records

Hugh Cornwell chronology
Guilty (1997)	Mayday (1999)	Solo (1999)

Mayday is a live album by Hugh Cornwell. It was a live show recorded at Sankey's Soap in Manchester on 1 May 1998, hence the title.

With Cornwell are Mike Polson (guitar and backing vocals), Michelle Marti (bass guitar and backing vocals) and Justin Chapman (drums). The set list consists entirely of Cornwell's solo work taken from his first two albums recorded after leaving The Stranglers, Wired and Guilty, and from his 1979 collaboration with the Captain Beefheart drummer Robert Williams, Nosferatu.

The album was initially an Internet download release from 1999 on Cornwell's own label, HIS Records (Catalogue number HIS CD002) and subsequently available on the Track Records label (catalogue number TRK1019CD, released October 7, 2002).

== Track listing ==
All tracks composed by Hugh Cornwell; except where indicated

1. "Irate Caterpillar"
2. "White Room" (Jack Bruce, Pete Brown)
3. "Nerves of Steel"
4. "Black Hair Black Eyes Black Suit"
5. "Torture Garden"
6. "Snapper"
7. "Big Sleep"
8. "Wired"
9. "Mothra"
10. "House of Sorrow"
11. "Long Dead Train"

== Personnel ==
- Hugh Cornwell - guitar, vocals
- Mike Polson - guitar, backing vocals
- Michelle Marti - bass guitar, backing vocals
- Justin Chapman - drums
