= Totem and Taboo (album) =

Studio album by Hugh Cornwell
- Released: June 2012
- Recorded: December 2011
- Studio: Electrical Audio, Chicago
- Length: 45:38
- Label: HIS (self-release); Cadiz Music (UK); Red River Entertainment (North America)

Hugh Cornwell chronology
Hooverdam (2008)	Totem and Taboo (2012)	Monster (2018)

Singles from Totem and Taboo
- 1. "God Is a Woman" Released: 22 October 2013

Totem and Taboo is the eighth studio album by English musician Hugh Cornwell, released in 2012. It was funded via PledgeMusic and initially self-released in June 2012 on Cornwell's own HIS Records, before coming out in September 2012 through Cadiz Music in the UK, and in June 2013 through Red River Entertainment in North America. The album was recorded in Chicago with recording engineer Steve Albini.

The album title is taken from a collection of essays by Sigmund Freud from 1913.

== Background ==
When preparing for the recording of Totem and Taboo, Hugh Cornwell was looking to make an album without any constraints from a record label, regarding ownership and how to record it. And through PledgeMusic, he managed to get it financed. From a list of engineers and producers to work with, Cornwell chose Steve Albini (Pixies, PJ Harvey, Nirvana), who was at the top of the list, available, and willing to do it. Cornwell's previous album, 2008's Hooverdam, was recorded on an eight-track recorder, a confined system he found interesting to work with. "I realized that to make a big record you don't need a lot of things. Less is more," he said. "So I took that forward this time even further. A lot of the guitar parts are just single notes. They're not even chords."

According to Cornwell, Albini doesn't like to be called a producer, he likes to be an engineer. He prefers working with people who have a clear idea of what they want, and then he'll facilitate getting those ideas recorded. "He loved it when we turned up and everything had been decided," Cornell said. He and his band, bassist Steve Fishman and drummer Chris Bell, sat down with Albini for the first day and worked out how many tracks they were going to need for each song, managing to get it all on 16-track. The album was recorded in 10 days at Albini's Electrical Audio studio in Chicago in December 2011. "Steve Albini was a perfect choice to work with," Cornwell said, "because he is very good at recording simple things and getting great sounds on simple things. He found it very easy working with us because we didn’t want anything complicated."

== Themes and composition ==
Talking about the theme of the album in 2014, Cornwell said, "As you get older you come to realise that nothing ever changes, only the characters change. So why try to change anything that's outside yourself? The songs explore different totems and different taboos." Cornwell has described the title track as a song of desperation and resignation. It is a song saying, "I have my way of looking at things and you have your way and they don't necessarily align."

"Love Me Slender," a bastardization of the title "Love Me Tender," has been described by Cornwell as a "black-comedy song". He explained that in art, "the definition of beauty has changed dramatically throughout the years. A couple of hundred years ago, a woman was beautiful if she were fat. And the reason why you were beautiful if you were fat is it meant you had money."

"Gods, Guns and Gays" is an observation about America and the word "gays" in the title represents freedom of speech. Musically, Cornwell was trying to write his impression of an Arthur Lee song, incorporating punk, psychedelia and pop all at once. "God Is a Woman" is built around the bass riff of Cream's 1969 song "Badge." "Hopefully people will consider, as I do," Cornwell said of the lyrics, "that this is a modern day "Peaches".

"The Face" is about an evening when Cornwell was invited along to the release of one of Madonna's albums in the 1990s. At one point during the party, he had to go to the bathroom and joined a queue. After waiting in line for a long time, Cornwell suddenly realised he'd joined the queue to meet Madonna in the bathroom, where she was holding meet and greets with her fans. "So I rushed out of the queue and hoped no one had seen me." In the song, Cornwell also name-checks Paul Roberts, who replaced him in the Stranglers in 1990. The two met briefly at the Madonna party.

Elsewhere, "I Want One of Those" concerns consumerism, and "In the Dead of Night" deals with mortality.

== Critical reception ==
Professional ratings
Review scores
Source	Rating
Classic Rock	3.5/5 stars
Ox-Fanzine	3.5/5 stars
The Upcoming	4/5 stars
Witchdoctor	3.5/5 stars

Classic Rock described the album's sound as "gloriously raw and vibrant," and wrote, "Cornwell's endearingly sardonic observations on freedom, consumerism and Madonna Louise Ciccone crackle with energy. Whether gently poking fun at middle-class myopia on "Stuck in Daily Mail Land" or smirking wryly at American morality on "Gods, Guns and Gays," he sounds more engaged and intense than he has in years." The Liverpool Sound and Vision website didn't feel that Totem and Taboo was quite as impressive as previous albums like Hooverdam (2008) or Hi Fi (2000), even though the album is "striking for its generosity of guitar and the spirit that pours of it." Among the website's album highlights were "God Is a Woman," which was described as a "self-admission of guilt and realisation of male mistakes made in the past," the "biting criticism" of "Stuck in Daily Mail Land," and what they called "the bizarrely titled but insanely brilliant" "Gods, Guns and Gays".

The Glasgow Herald wrote that Cornwell "continues to produce compelling, individual work," and that the album "has some of the propulsive, gritty energy of early Stranglers, driven by Chris Bell's drumming and Steve Fishman's driving bass work." They also noted the album's "eloquent" lyrics. Witchdoctor magazine described Totem and Taboo as "musically orthodox and stripped-back" with a "gritty, raw" sound. Lyrically, they felt that Cornwell "is still as unflinching, as honest as ever, and still telling it like it is without any decoration or attempt at tarting it up." They concluded that Totem and Taboo "is proof positive that [Cornwell is] neither mellowed, nor a spent force."

Many reviewers noted album closer "In the Dead of Night", calling it the best track on the album and one of Cornwell's finest and most epic solo tracks. The Louder Than War website described the track as "10 minutes of steamy music noir."

== Track listing ==
All tracks are written by Hugh Cornwell

No.	Title	Length
1.	"Totem and Taboo"	4:29
2.	"The Face"	4:20
3.	"I Want One of Those"	4:06
4.	"Stuck in Daily Mail Land"	3:55
5.	"Bad Vibrations"	3:56
6.	"God Is a Woman"	4:09
7.	"Love Me Slender"	3:22
8.	"Gods, Guns and Gays"	3:42
9.	"A Street Called Carroll"	3:53
10.	"In the Dead of Night"	9:36

== Personnel ==
Musicians

- Hugh Cornwell – vocals, guitar
- Steve Fishman – bass, backing vocals, keyboards on "In the Dead of Night"
- Chris Bell – drums, percussion

Technical

- Steve Albini – engineer, mixing
- Chris Goulstone – mastering
- Sara-Jane Smith – artwork
