= Footprints in the Desert =

Studio album by Hugh Cornwell
- Released: April 2002
- Recorded: 1990–1996
- Genre: Alternative rock Post-punk
- Length: 50:41
- Label: Track
- Producer: James Cadsky

Hugh Cornwell chronology
Hi Fi (2000)	Footprints in the Desert (2002)	In the Dock (2003)

Footprints in the Desert is the fifth studio album by Hugh Cornwell, released in April 2002 by Track Record. This album, Cornwell's second "lost album", compiles rare and unreleased tracks from the mid-1990s that were not part of a record deal. It was recorded in Bath with James Cadsky, who engineered the Wired album.

The same year, Track Records also reissued Cornwell's 1999 album, Mayday, on CD.

In 2006, Cornwell told online music magazine Penny Black Music that the album "was a set of songs that I had recorded in the mid 90's which had never got released because I was out of a publishing deal and out of a record contract. On demand from the fan base we decided to put that out."

== Track listing ==
All tracks are written by Hugh Cornwell, except where noted.

No.	Title	Writer(s)	Length
1.	"If You Wanted To"		4:04
2.	"Everybody"		3:02
3.	"I Can't Handle It"		3:51
4.	"Fresh Air"		3:44
5.	"One Fine Thing"		4:01
6.	"Lady in Mind"		4:21
7.	"So Sexual"		3:43
8.	"Touch Touch"		3:39
9.	"Venus in Furs"	Lou Reed	5:07
10.	"For What It's Worth"	Stephen Stills	3:00
11.	"Keep It Under Your Hat"		3:18
12.	"Coming of Age"		4:00
13.	"Sex Bomb"		3:38
14.	"2000 Lights"		1:13

== Personnel ==
Credits adapted from AllMusic.

Musicians

- Hugh Cornwell – vocals, instrumentation
- Phil Andrews – keyboards
- Chris Goulstone – guitar
- Ted Mason – guitar
- Steve Lawrence – bass
- Chris Bell – drums
- Spencer May – percussion programming

Technical

- Hugh Cornwell – engineer, mixing, liner notes
- Phil Andrews – engineer, mixing
- Spencer May – engineer
- Robin Barclay – mixing
- Trevor Curwen – mixing
- Shaun Kirkpatrick – mixing
- Chris Goulstone – mixing, mastering
- Ra – graphic design
- Eric Fagence – cover painting
- Bob Whitfield – cover photo
