= CCW (album) =

Studio album by Hugh Cornwell, Roger Cook and Andy West
- Released: 1992
- Recorded: December 1991
- Studio: Koh-san Studios, Bath
- Length: 37:28
- Label: UFO
- Producer: Hugh Cornwell; Neil Davidge

Hugh Cornwell chronology
Wolf (1988)	CCW (1992)	Wired (1993)

Singles from CCW
- 1. "Sweet Sister" Released: 13 April 1992

CCW is an album by Hugh Cornwell, formerly of the new wave group the Stranglers, with Roger Cook and Andy West (CCW: Cornwell, Cook, West). It was released in 1992 by UFO Records.

== Background ==
Through his publishing company, Cornwell had been put together with English songwriter Roger Cook in the late 1980s to write songs. Cook was known for his songwriting collaboration with Roger Greenaway in the 1960s, penning songs such as "I'd Like to Teach the World to Sing" (The New Seekers) and "Something's Gotten Hold of My Heart" (Gene Pitney). Now living in Nashville in the US, Cook would periodically come to England to write with other songwriters. "Every few months he would come over and we would write a song," Cornwell said in 2006. "And then we had so many of these songs written that I suggested we do a record together. We brought in a third singer-songwriter called Andy West and so we became Cornwell, Cook and West."

The CCW album was recorded in December 1991 at Koh-san Studios in Bath with Cornwell producing. Neil Davidge, who would later work with Massive Attack, among others, co-produced 5 of the albums 10 tracks. With a 7-piece band, including session drummer Rob Brian, the trio promoted the album in 1992, playing shows in the UK and Europe.

"Sweet Sister" was released as a single from the album. Different formats included the non-album tracks "Let It Fall" and "Friend Wheel", penned by Andy West, and "I Believe", penned by Cook. The CD-single and 12" also included an 'FM Rock Club Mix' of "Sweet Sister" by remixer Simon Harris.

== Track listing ==
No.	Title	Writer(s)	Length
1.	"Sweet Sister"	Hugh Cornwell	3:46
2.	"She's Gone"	Cornwell, Roger Cook	4:04
3.	"Invisible"	Cornwell	3:54
4.	"More or Less"	Cook, Ted Mason	2:50
5.	"Psycho"	Leon Payne	4:42
6.	"Double the Dose"	Andy West	2:49
7.	"Holes"	Cornwell, Cook	3:14
8.	"Dance Me to the Edge of the World"	West	3:08
9.	"Heaven and Hell"	Cornwell, Cook	3:36
10.	"Wasted Tears"	Cornwell	5:25

== Personnel ==
Credits adapted from the album liner notes.

CCW

- Hugh Cornwell – vocals, electric and acoustic guitar
- Roger Cook – vocals, electric and acoustic ukulele
- Andy West – vocals, electric and acoustic guitar

Additional musicians

- Herbie Flowers – electric and acoustic bass (1, 2, 4, 6, 7, 9)
- Chris Goulstone – lead guitar (1, 10)
- Joel Squires – harmonica (3)
- Rob Brian – snare drum (4), drum kit (6), tabla (8)
- Stuart Gordon – violin (5, 6)

Technical

- Hugh Cornwell – producer
- Neil Davidge – co-producer (1, 2, 7, 9, 10)
- Pete Parsons – engineer
- Phil Smee – design, photography
