= Dooleys (album) =

Studio album by The Dooleys
- Released: July 1978
- Recorded: 1977–78
- Genre: Pop, MOR
- Length: 38.11
- Label: GTO Records
- Producer: Ben Findon

The Dooleys chronology
Dooleys (1978)	The Best of The Dooleys (1979)

Dooleys was the first UK album by British pop group The Dooleys. It was released on GTO Records in 1978 and featured the top 20 hits "Think I'm Gonna Fall in Love with You", "Love of My Life" and "A Rose Has to Die".

== Background ==
The Dooleys had been a recording act for four years by this point, but it wasn't until mid 1977 when they scored their first chart hit with "Think I'm Gonna Fall in Love With You", which reached the UK top 20. Follow-up single "Love of My Life" became a top 10 hit, while "Don't Take it Lyin' Down" was also a minor hit. The group then released this, their first studio album. (They had released an earlier album in Russia, which was a live album recorded while they toured there, and had sold well.)) Despite three hit singles, the album failed to chart. After its release, another single was taken from it; "A Rose Has to Die", which also was a top 20 success, peaking at No.11. The album was mainly produced by Ben Findon, who would go on to be songwriter and producer for the group for a few more years and would guide them through their hit-making period. The album also included "Hands Across the Sea", which had been The Dooleys first ever single back in 1974, and had also been an entry into A Song for Europe that year, performed by Olivia Newton-John.

In 1977, South African singer Dennis East's version of "Stone Walls", reached number 12 on the South African charts. "A Rose Has to Die" was also recorded by UK group The Ryders, while "What's Gonna Happen to Our Love" had been recorded by Billy Ocean.

Soon after the release of the album, the group's younger sister, Helen Dooley joined the line-up, after having contributed to the writing of one of this album's tracks.

Dooleys was released on Compact disc for the first time on 14 September 2009 in a double-pack with The Chosen Few.

== Track listing ==
Side one

1. "Love of My Life" (Findon Myers) 3.06
2. "Absolutely Wild Over You" (Findon / Myers) 2.48
3. "Dont Let Me Be the Last to Know" (Findon / Myers) 3.40
4. "A Rose Has to Die" (Findon) 2.43
5. "Better Off Without You" (Findon / Myers) 3.38
6. "Hands Across the Sea" (Findon / Wilkins) 3.23

Side two

1. "Think I'm Gonna Fall in Love With You" (Findon / Myers) 3.04
2. "Stone Walls" (Findon / Wilkins) 3.03
3. "What's Gonna Happen to Our Love" (Findon / Wilkins) 3.02
4. "You Make My Heart Beat Faster" (Findon / Wilkins) 3.02
5. "Forever" (Dooleys / Myers / H. Dooley) 3.18
6. "Don't Take It Lying Down" (Findon / Myers) 3.24

CD Bonus tracks

1. "Goodbye Hallelujah Island" (The Dooleys) 2.48
2. "Only You Can Get Me By" (J. Dooley / B. Walsh) 2.45
3. "Hungry for Love" (Findon / Myers) 2.46

== Personnel ==
- Jim Dooley - vocals
- Anne Dooley - vocals
- Kathy Dooley - vocals
- John Dooley - Guitar and vocals
- Frank Dooley - Guitar and vocals
- Bob Walsh - Bass guitar
- Alan Bogan - Drums
- Ben Findon - Producer
- Mike Myers - Assistant producer
- Tom Parker - Orchestration
- George Nicholson - Engineer
- Simon Wakefield - Engineer
- Recorded at Morgan Studios, London
