= Rob Reynolds (musician) =

English musician (born 1967)

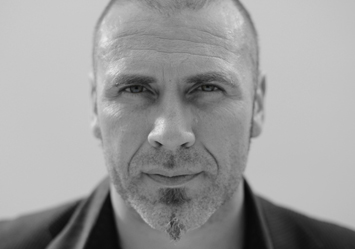
- Cover shot for new album 'Coming Home'

Background information
- Born: Robert John Reynolds; 5 December 1967 (age 58); Portsmouth, Hampshire, England
- Genres: Rock, singer songwriter
- Occupations: Musician, songwriter, singer, guitarist, producer
- Instruments: Guitar, lap steel guitar
- Years active: 1982–present
- Label: Invisible Hands Music
- Website: robreynolds.co.uk

Rob Reynolds (born 5 December 1967) is an English singer-songwriter and a recording artist. He plays acoustic and electric guitar, lap steel, dobro steel, harmonica, bass and keyboards.

He was a contestant at the second The Voice UK music competition in 2013, performing Pink Floyd's "Wish You Were Here" as his blind audition.

== Biography ==
=== Early life ===
Reynolds was born in Portsmouth, Hampshire, England. The family moved around a lot for his father's work and eventually settled in Harrogate, North Yorkshire when Rob was two years old . He attended Rossett High School. At the age of 15 he started singing blues and jazz in local venues, formed Burt Reynolds and the Boardwalkers and joined various other bands. He started learning the guitar at 16, which gave him the ability to write his own material.

His father died in August 1993, and he moved to London in early 1994.

== The career years ==
1990s

Reynolds soon found a manager, Carl Miller, in the form of veteran, who'd been Cat Stevens' personal manager, and started his first project when Carl introduced him to Alvin Gibbs of punk veterans UK Subs, through Carl and Alvin. Reynolds came to the attention of the then-fledgling London-based Indie record company, Invisible Hands Music.

Initially signing in a development deal in 1995, IHM put Reynolds out on the road supporting Midge Ure for eight months and followed that with shows with Procol Harum, Big Joe Turner, China Crisis and Errol Brown. He recorded some early demos with a band that included drummer Chuck Sabo (Natalie Imbruglia), It Bites keyboard player John Beck, produced by Dexy's Midnight Runners bassist Nigel Ross-Scott.

The debut album, Waiting for the Tide, was recorded in the summer of 1996 at Jacob's Studios in Farnham, Surrey with an all-star cast featuring drummer Darren Mooney from Primal Scream, bassist Jon Noyce from Jethro Tull, keyboard player Reg Webb of Lenny Kravitz and produced by ace guitarist Greg Bone (Seal, Sting, Take That) and sound engineer Robin Black, Wings, The Who, and Pink Floyd.

The first single was a cover of the Harold Arlen and Ted Koehler jazz standard "Stormy Weather" (the only cover on Waiting for the Tide). It received the Single of the Week accolade by Jazz FM.

On the release of single "Take It Easy" Reynolds continued travelling the country performing live sessions on dozens of BBC and ILR stations and was invited to launch the nation's newest terrestrial television network Channel 5 with its first afternoon show Five's Company, hosted by Nick Knowles.

2000s

A period of writing and touring followed, which resulted in the release in 2000 of a self-produced seven-track mini-album entitled Samsara Never Sleeps, recorded at Skyline Studios Epsom. The UK music monthly Mojo Magazine made Samara Never Sleeps one of their four 'Critics Choice' for the month.

After a period of recording for a label in Germany, which included sessions with the Munich Symphony Orchestra and some 5.1 Surround mixes, Rob returned to London in the autumn of 2002 and recorded his third album, Sightseeing. Sightseeing saw Rob hit his peak as a singer, a writer and a producer, bringing together his rocking live band and a host of top guests including, guitarist Steve Harris (Gary Numan), keyboard player Richard Cottle (Seal), and percussionist Miles Bould (Sting).

The first single, "Sweet Mother", hit the airwaves in July, staying on the BBC Radio 2 playlist for five weeks; and Radio 2 invited Rob to perform two tracks live to a massive radio audience as part of their Great British Music Debate. Regional radio racked up over 40 playlists including PBS106.7FM.

In Europe the single was A listed by the Netherlands and Belgium's equivalent of Radio 1.

2004 saw Reynolds begin the year with a tour of radio stations around the country. 31 March 2004 heralded the start of a tour with Hazel O'Connor, taking him around the UK and The Netherlands.

In February 2005 Reynolds played on the 'Best of British' stage at MIDEM in Cannes, France, in June Rob dueted on Hazel O'Connor's Hidden Heart (2005) album. Reynolds then twice toured Canada, performing showcases at Canada Music Week on the first tour and on the second tour playing at NXNE. Later in the year 2005 he then played two sets at the Glastonbury Festival and won the Baltic Song Contest for England in Malmö, Sweden. During the year 2005 Reynolds also opened for other acts including: Paul Carrack, Amos Lee and Arthur Lee and Love.

In 2006 Reynolds released his fourth album, a compilation of his work to date entitled The Curious World, drawn from his three studio albums. He then returned to Canada in 2007 to play NXNE, and toured with Hugh Cornwell from The Stranglers which would take him from Toronto to Montreal. Reynolds then went straight to Winnipeg to embark on his fifth album Coming Home, with Multi Juno award-winning producer Brandon Friesen.

In 2008 Reynolds's long time friend and producer Tom Jackson in Switzerland, asks him to co-write the melodies and lyrics for a German band called Rauschhardt. They recorded the songs in Hanover and Berlin and the album is to be released in 2010, with guitarist Tom Rauschhardt, bass player Jäcki Reznicek, drummer Sebastian Reznicek and keyboard player Christoph von Haniel.

In 2009 Reynolds completed the album Coming Home. He also made guest appearances on two songs with dance producer Boyan, and a duet with 1970s psycho/prog rockers Wally on their first album in 30 years. He played over 200 shows, including a French music festival in August 2009, Rochefort Accords, where he performed with Piers Faccini and B.J. Cole, vibraphone player Roger Beaujolais and Rob Arnos on sax.

== Albums ==
- Waiting for the Tide (1997)
- Samsara (2000)
- Sightseeing (aka Take Me Sightseeing) (2003)
- The Curious World (2006) Compilation album
- Coming Home (2010)

== Past appearances and tours ==
- 2005 Newbury Fringe Festival
- 2005 Winner of the Baltic Song Contest, Malmö, Sweden
- 2005 Hidden Heart Tour with Hazel O'Connor
- 2005 MIDEM at Cannes, France
- 2005 NXNE Canada
- 2005 Glastonbury Festival, Glastonbury, UK
- 2006 Canada Music Week
- 2007 NXNE Canada
- 2007 Tour with Hugh Cornwell
- 2008 The Bedford Bandstand at Clapham Common, London
- 2009 Rochefort Accords Music Festival, France
