= Moments of Madness =

Studio album by Hugh Cornwell
- Released: 21 October 2022
- Genre: Rock
- Label: His
- Producer: Hugh Cornwell

Hugh Cornwell chronology
Monster (2018)	Moments of Madness (2022)

Singles from Moments of Madness
- 1. "Red Rose" Released: 18 April 2022

Professional ratings
Review scores
Source	Rating
Louder Than War	8/10
Mojo	4/5 stars
Record Collector	4/5 stars
Uncut	7/10

Moments of Madness is the tenth studio album by the English musician Hugh Cornwell, released on 21 October 2022 by His Records.

== Background ==
The album was self-produced by Cornwell, with all instruments also played by himself.

Coinciding with the album's announcement, the single "Red Rose" was released as across major streaming platforms on 18 April 2022. A 21-date UK tour was also announced to take place during November and December 2022.

The album's lyrical content covers themes of ageing, tattoos and "how the throwaway society is blighting the country with litter".

== Track listing ==
All tracks are written by Hugh Cornwell.

Moments of Madness track listing
No.	Title	Length
1.	"Coming Out of the Wilderness"	4:35
2.	"Red Rose"	3:26
3.	"I Wannahideinsideaya"	3:34
4.	"Looking for You"	3:34
5.	"When I Was a Young Man"	3:13
6.	"Moments of Madness"	3:52
7.	"Beware of the Doll"	3:55
8.	"Too Much Trash"	2:57
9.	"Lasagna"	3:07
10.	"Heartbreak at Seven"	3:43
Total length:		35:56

== Personnel ==
- Hugh Cornwell – lead and backing vocals, guitar, bass, drums, percussion, mixing, production
- Phil Andrews – additional drum programming, percussion, engineering, mixing
- John Dominic – harmonica (Track 6)

== Charts ==
Chart performance for Moments of Madness
Chart (2022)	Peak position
Scottish Albums (Official Charts)	11
UK Albums (Official Charts)	44
UK Independent Albums (Official Charts)	7
