= In Car Stereo =

Studio album by The Dooleys
- Released: 1983
- Genre: Pop, MOR
- Label: Epic/Sony Records (Japan)
- Producer: John Dooley, Alan Bogan

The Dooleys chronology
Secrets (1981)	In Car Stereo (1983)

In Car Stereo is the final album by British pop group The Dooleys. It failed to secure a release in the UK and was only issued in Japan.

Following the failure of their previous album and follow-up singles, the group was dropped by Epic Records. The Dooleys set up their own label, R 'n' R Records, and recorded this album with a new female vocalist, Vicki Roe. The first single released was "Flavour of the Month" in September 1983, but charted outside the UK top 100 at 106 and forced them to shelve the album. The album did get a release in Japan (on Epic/Sony Records), however, where the group had enjoyed two earlier No.1 singles, along with the release of the title track as a single. Neither charted in Japan and this effectively marked the end of The Dooleys as a recording act.

The Dooleys continued touring and released a limited edition 12" single, "New Beginning", under the name Force 8, but this failed to attract any attention. The song itself became a big hit for Bucks Fizz in 1986 however. That same year, "Flavour of the Month" was belatedly released as a single in Ireland, where Vicki Roe was originally from. It gained much radio attention, but failed to chart.

The Dooleys went through further line-up changes and finally disbanded in 1991.

== Track listing ==
Side one

1. "In Car Stereo" (Leeson / Vale)
2. "Put Me on Ice" (Lyons / Reaney)
3. "Wherever You're Going" (May)
4. "Hanging Round No More" (Leeson / Vale)
5. "Can't Dance" (Dooley / Bogan / Gold)
6. "Casualty" (Bliss / Demick)

Side two

1. "Let Me Know" (May)
2. "Flavour of the Month" (Bugatti / Musker)
3. "Eeny Meeny Macka Rack" (Lane / Stockley / Hidemark)
4. "Don't Make Me Do It" (Lewis)
5. "Late at Night" (May)

== Personnel ==
- John Dooley and Alan Bogan - Producers
- "Dixie" John Taggart and Gaz "Yosser" Morgan - Musical arrangers
- Frank Dooley - Vocal arranger
- Recorded at Pennine Studios, Oldham
