= The Chosen Few (The Dooleys album) =

Studio album by The Dooleys
- Released: October 1979
- Genre: Pop, MOR
- Length: 37.21
- Label: GTO Records
- Producer: Ben Findon

The Dooleys chronology
The Best of The Dooleys (1979)	The Chosen Few (1979)	Full House (1980)

The Chosen Few is a 1979 album by British pop group The Dooleys.

The album contains the singles "Chosen Few" and "Wanted" - both of which were top 10 hits. "Wanted" had already appeared on the group's previous album, The Best of The Dooleys, but appeared here in a slightly extended version. Current single "Chosen Few" reached No.7 in the UK Charts, after previous single had reached No.3 and album No.6, making this the peak of the group's career. This album however only managed to reach No.56, although that was an improvement on the group's previous studio album, which missed the charts completely in 1978.

Track "One Kiss Away" had been previously recorded by Billy Ocean (who also co-wrote it under his real name, Les Charles), while "Growing Pains" had been recorded by Guys 'n' Dolls in 1977.

The Chosen Few was released on Compact disc for the first time on 14 September 2009 in a double-pack with their debut album, Dooleys.

== Track listing ==
Side one

1. "The Chosen Few" (Findon) 3.07
2. "Whispers" (Findon / Myers / Puzey) 2.53
3. "One Kiss Away" (Findon / Charles) 2.41
4. "Don't Turn the Feeling Down" (Findon / Myers / Puzey) 2.49
5. "If I Didn't Know You Better" (Findon / Myers / Puzey) 3.39
6. "Love" (Findon / Anthony) 3.07

Side two

1. "Growing Pains" (Findon / Myers / Puzey) 3.23
2. "You Bring Out The Best in Me" (Findon / Myers) 4.17
3. "Let's Make Believe" (Findon / Myers / Puzey) 3.55
4. "Wanted" (Findon / Myers / Puzey) 3.58
5. "Now That the Party is Over" (Findon / Myers / Puzey) 3.32

CD Bonus tracks

1. "A Million to One" (The Dooleys) 2.59
2. "Honey I'm Lost" (Findon / Myers) 3.03
3. "I Dedicate My Life" (H.Dooley / J.Dooley / Myers) 2.29
4. "Movie Stars (& Comic Book Heroes)" (H.Dooley / J.Dooley / Myers) 3.41
5. "Wanted" (single version) 3.29

== Personnel ==
- Jim Dooley - vocals
- Anne Dooley - vocals
- Kathy Dooley - vocals
- John Dooley - Guitar and vocals
- Frank Dooley - Guitar and vocals
- Helen Dooley - Keyboards and vocals
- Bob Walsh - Bass guitar
- Alan Bogan - Drums
- Ben Findon - Producer
- Mike Myers - Assistant producer
- Tom Parker - Orchestration
- Neil Richardson - Orchestration on "You Bring Out the Best in Me"
- George Nicholson - Engineer
- Simon Wakefield - Assistant engineer
- Jan Leary - Sleeve design
- Recorded at Morgan Studios, London
