= A Time Like This =

Single by Haywoode

from the album Arrival
- A-side: "A Time Like This"
- B-side: "A Time Like This (Dance Mix)"
- Released: September 1983
- Recorded: July 1983
- Genre: Funk-pop, post-disco
- Length: 3:59
- Composer: (L. Naiff/M. Myers)
- Producers: Mike Myers & Lynton Naiff

Haywoode singles chronology
"A Time Like This" (1983)	"Single Handed" (1983)

"A Time Like This" was a 1983 single by British singer Haywoode; and was released as her debut single and the lead single from the album "Arrival". It was a minor hit in the UK, registering on the pop and the dance charts.

== Background ==
Haywoode's career had started as a regular Hill's Angel on The Benny Hill Show, but forayed into music in the summer of 1983.

The song was written and produced by Mike Myers and Lynton Naiff and was released in September 1983, but did not include a music video.

It is included as the eighth track on her debut studio album Arrival that was released in 1985.

A mix of the song by Nick Martinelli is included on Haywoode's Roses Remixes & Rarities album that was released in 2018.

== Reception ==
The single had a positive review by Eleanor Levy in the 20 August 1983 issue of Record Mirror. Levy wrote that it was fast disco funk with a strong beat and that the song was tailor made for the charts. Its success resulted in Haywoode's later music being produced.

== Charts ==
Spending nine weeks on the pop chart, it peaked at No. 48. It also was a dance hit, registering on the Music Week Top Disco and Dance singles chart.
