= The Dooleys =

British pop group

- Origin: Ilford, Essex, England
- Genres: Pop, MOR
- Years active: 1967–1991
- Labels: Alaska, GTO, Epic, R'n'R
- Past members: Jim Dooley; John Dooley; Frank Dooley; Kathy Dooley; Anne Dooley; Helen Dooley; Alan Bogan; Bob Walsh; Vincent Naylor; Paul Dean; Phil Brown; David John Hinson

The Dooleys were a British male–female pop group comprising at its peak eight members – six of them in the Dooley family. The group achieved several UK chart hits between 1977 and 1981, including top-ten hits "Wanted", "Love of My Life" and "The Chosen Few".

== Career ==
=== Early days ===
The group began in the late 1960s as "The Dooley Family", composed of brothers Jim (vocals), John (guitar and vocals) and Frank (guitar and vocals) with sisters Marie, Anne and Kathy (all vocals). Based in Ilford, Essex, England, the group had work that was mostly limited to theatres and hotels because the three youngest members were still at school and therefore not allowed to perform in pubs. They appeared in variety shows alongside popular entertainers such as Bob Monkhouse, Frankie Howerd, Norman Collier and Anne Shelton.

In 1972, they were joined by friend Bob Walsh (bass guitar) who was born in Manchester. His brother Vince Miller was a club compere and ran a booking agency with colleague Brian Mills. The pair took the group to Manchester for some trials in north of England clubs. They went down well with audiences and were told that they could achieve greater success if they were to base themselves permanently in the north of England. As a result, they moved to Worsley, Lancashire, during 1973 without Marie, who was by now pregnant with her first child, and did not feel she could commit to the band.

Following their move north, most of the gigs were booked by Jim and Bob (who spent their evenings visiting working men's clubs, selling the act). At that time, major agents were not interested in this kind of family group, and it took a lot of work on the band's part to convince them otherwise. In the meantime, they continued polishing their act and playing clubs. Eventually, they signed a management deal with Ken Wild; he introduced them to drummer Alan Bogan, who joined the group.

They gained their first recording contract with John Schroeder who signed them to his Alaska Records company in 1974, and released two singles. The first of these was "Hands Across the Sea" (although its release was delayed by its entry into the Song for Europe contest, to be sung by Olivia Newton-John).

=== Early success ===
In 1975, they were invited to tour in Eastern Europe. During the tour they recorded a live album at the Rossia Hall in Moscow (The Dooley Family in Moscow, Live Concert at Rossia Hall, 29 October 1975). The album went on to sell two million copies there. This was a couple of years before they had a chart hit in their homeland, and some three years before Elton John's concerts in Russia.

Back home in 1975, the Dooleys (as they had now become) recorded the theme tune for an adult educational programme on BBC Television called On the Move, which featured Bob Hoskins. In 1976, their live act was noticed by Club Mirror magazine and the National Club Charities' National Club Acts Awards, with the group winning "Best Group" at the 1976 ceremony. Due to their win at the National Club Acts Awards, they were invited onto an Awards Edition of The Wheeltappers and Shunters Social Club with fellow winners Tony Monopoly, Pat Mills and Lena Zavaroni, with the group singing "Magic Garden" and "Carpet Man".

Aware that Billy Ocean was in the UK chart with a song written by Ben Findon, who had also written their first single, they contacted him and he went to see them performing. While there he offered them a recording contract with GTO Records.

=== Chart success ===
In the summer of 1977 (a decade after they were formed) the Dooleys had their first hit with "Think I'm Gonna Fall in Love With You".

The existing members of the family were joined in early 1979 by the youngest member of the group, Helen (keyboards). Subsequent UK hits gave them the record of being the largest family act ever featured on a hit single.

A string of hits followed with varying degrees of success, and they travelled around Europe and the Far East as one of the busiest live acts around. Their chart run came to a peak in 1979 when they scored their two biggest hits: "Wanted" (UK no. 3) and "The Chosen Few" (UK no. 7). "Wanted" was also a hit in Japan, where it reached no. 1 for ten weeks, and led to their being entered into the Tokyo Music Festival in 1980. They won the "Gold Award" (second place) with the song "Body Language" (a song written by Ben Findon, Mike Myers and Robert Puzey), which also went to no. 1 (for seven weeks).

Despite the Dooleys' international success, the hits in their homeland started to dry up, though the act were still a major club draw, winning the "Club Mirror Club Acts Award" for Best Group in 1981 and playing major venues such as Birmingham's 'Night Out Theatre Restaurant' and Manchester's 'Golden Garter'. Shortly after, Anne and Bob started a family which led to them leaving the group. Helen also decided to leave at the same time, and the threesome departed for a new life in South Africa. Anne was replaced by a former Miss Ireland Universe, Vicki Roe (aka Valerie Roe), while Bob's replacement on bass was Gaz Morgan. Prior to their Tokyo Music Festival success, the Dooleys had employed John "Dixie" Taggart as musical director and keyboard player. Taggart took over all keyboards duties after Helen's departure.

=== Later career ===
By the mid 1980s, brothers John and Frank, and drummer Alan Bogan, all left the group. They were replaced by a succession of other musicians such as: drummer Paul Dean, bassist Phil Brown and keyboard player, David John Hinson. Although Jim and Kathy continued. John, Frank and Alan formed "The New Dooleys" about twelve months after leaving, but by 1992 it was all over, and both groups had retired from performing. In recent years, the Dooley brothers (Jim, John, Joe and Frank) have recorded a collection of new songs, which was released early in 2007.

The group reunited for a one-off performance on 6 January 2006, at Helderberg Nature Reserve near Cape Town, South Africa.

In 2012, Helen, Anne and Bob (now living in Somerset West near Cape Town, South Africa), performed as a band called Shiraz.

Kathy Dooley died from complications of dementia on 22 April 2026, at the age of 70.

== Discography ==
=== Albums ===
Year	Album	UK	Certifications	Record label
1978	Dooleys	—		GTO
1979	The Best of The Dooleys	6	BPI: Gold	GTO
1979	The Chosen Few	56		GTO
1980	Full House	54		GTO
1981	Secrets	—		GTO
1983	In Car Stereo	—		R'n'R

=== Singles ===
Year	Title	UK	IRE	Certifications	Album	Record label
1974	"Hands Across the Sea"	—	—		Non-album singles	Alaska
1974	"Sha La La Lullaby"	—	—		Non-album singles	Alaska
1975	"On the Move"	—	—		Non-album singles	Beeb
1977	"Think I'm Gonna Fall in Love with You"	13	—		The Dooleys	GTO
1977	"Love of My Life"	9	14	BPI: Silver	The Dooleys	GTO
1978	"Don't Take It Lyin' Down"	60	—		The Dooleys	GTO
1978	"A Rose Has to Die"	11	9		The Dooleys	GTO
1979	"Honey I'm Lost"	24	23		The Best of The Dooleys	GTO
1979	"Wanted"	3	3	BPI: Silver	The Best of The Dooleys	GTO
1979	"The Chosen Few"	7	4	BPI: Silver	The Chosen Few	GTO
1980	"Love Patrol"	29	—		Full House	GTO
1980	"Body Language"	46	—		Full House	GTO
1980	"In a Riddle"	—	—		Full House	GTO
1981	"Taken at the Flood"	—	—		Non-album single	GTO
1981	"And I Wish"	52	—		Secrets	GTO
1981	"The Dancer"	—	—		Secrets	Epic
1982	"Will You or Won't You"	—	—		Non-album single	Epic
1983	"Flavour of the Month"	—	—		In Car Stereo	R'n'R
1985	"New Beginning" (as Force 8)	—	—		Non-album single	New Merseybeat

In October 2005, a fourteen-track CD featuring their ten UK chart hits, plus four other songs was issued as The Best of the Dooleys. In early 2007, The Dooley Brothers Band Return contained sixteen tracks of new songs, featuring just the three brothers. In 2009, their albums Dooleys and The Chosen Few were released on CD for the first time. The two-disc set featured both albums in full, plus bonus tracks. Full House and Secrets were released in this format in May 2013. A triple CD compilation set, Gold, was released in 2021.
