= Full House (The Dooleys album) =

Studio album by The Dooleys
- Released: October 1980
- Recorded: 1979–1980
- Genre: Pop, MOR
- Length: 53.43
- Label: GTO Records
- Producer: Ben Findon

The Dooleys chronology
The Chosen Few (1979)	Full House (1980)	Secrets (1981)

Full House is a 1980 album by British pop group The Dooleys. It included the singles "Love Patrol", "Body Language", "In a Riddle" and the UK top ten hit "The Chosen Few" among its 16 tracks. It was produced by Ben Findon.

== Overview ==
Full House was the group's third studio album and featured the singles "Love Patrol" (UK #29), "Body Language" (UK #46) and "In a Riddle". The 1979 top 10 hit "Chosen Few" was added to the album, despite it being featured on the group's previous album, The Chosen Few. In fact, nine of the previous album's eleven songs appeared on this sixteen-track collection. This cost-cutting measure was a disappointment to fans expecting an album of new songs. However, seven of the tracks were new, although these included the three already-released singles and some cover versions. The only two completely new and original songs out of the sixteen were "I Spy" - a song written by the group themselves and one that had been released as a single in Japan - and "Meet Me Halfway". As well as this, the previously released track "Whispers" was included here in a newly recorded version (although had appeared as a B-side to "Body Language").

The album's peak chart position marginally improved on the previous album, reaching No.54 (two places higher), but "Love Patrol" (released over six months before the album) would be their last Top 40 hit and their final appearance on Top of the Pops in March 1980. In Japan however, their success continued with "Body Language" becoming their second number one. Another album was released there around this time titled Pop Fantasia, which while including some tracks recycled from here and from B-sides, it featured four tracks never released in the UK: "Only the Music's Changed" (also released as a single), "How Am I Ever Gonna Live it Down", "Situation Vacant" and "A Little Bit Special".

In May 2013 Full House was released on Compact disc for the first time by Cherry Red Records. This was in a double-pack with the group's 1981 album, Secrets. The release included a number of bonus tracks including three B-side-only songs from this period. The second disc featured three of the four Japan-only tracks. (Only "Situation Vacation" was not included on the CD.)

== Track listing ==
Side one

1. "Love Patrol" (Findon / Myers / Puzey) 2.41
2. "Growing Pains" (Findon / Myers) 3.24
3. "Let's Make Believe" (Findon / Myers / Puzey) 3.56
4. "Operator" (Spivery) 3.05
5. "Don't Turn the Feeling Down" (Findon / Myers / Puzey) 2.50
6. "You Bring Out the Best in Me" (Findon / Myers) 4.19
7. "One Kiss Away" (Findon / Charles) 2.42
8. "I Spy" (The Dooleys) 3.05

Side two

1. "Body Language" (Findon / Myers / Puzey) 2.59
2. "Chosen Few" (Findon) 3.08
3. "Whispers" (Findon / Myers / Puzey) 2.54
4. "Don't Cry for Me Argentina" (Lloyd-Webber / Rice) 4.34
5. "Now That the Party is Over" (Findon / Myers / Puzey) 3.31
6. "Love" (Findon / Anthony) 3.06
7. "Meet Me Halfway" (Findon / Myers / Puzey) 4.10
8. "In a Riddle" (Findon / Myers / Puzey) 3.19

CD Bonus tracks

1. "Once Upon a Happy Ending"(The Dooleys) 3.43 [non-LP B-side, UK, 1980]
2. "Sign of the Times" (Dixie / Dooley / Myers) 3.12 [non-LP B-side, UK, 1980]
3. "Going Solo" (Dixie / Dooley / Myers) 3.04 [non-LP B-side, UK, 1980]
4. "Stand Up Like a Man" (Findon / Myers) 4.10 [from 'Best of The Dooleys' LP, UK, 1979]
5. "Sad Old Spanish Guitar" (Findon / Puzey) 3.12 [from 'Best of The Dooleys' LP, UK, 1979]
6. "Body Language (Extended Version)" (Findon / Myers / Puzey) 5.19 [12-inch single, Japan, 1980]

== Personnel ==
- Jim Dooley - Vocals
- John Dooley - Guitar
- Frank Dooley - Guitar
- Anne Dooley - Vocals
- Kathy Dooley - Vocals
- Helen Dooley - Keyboards
- Bob Walsh - Bass
- Alan Bogan - Drums
- Ben Findon - Producer
- Mike Myers - Assistant producer
- "Dixie" John Taggart - Musical director
- George Nicholson and Simon Wakefield - Engineers
- Seabrook Graves & Aslett - Sleeve design
- Ian Leary - Sleeve concept
- Derek Aslett - Sleeve photography

== Body Language ==
Body Language is a song included in the Full House album. It was released as a single and reached number 46 on the UK singles chart in September 1980, spending 4 weeks in that chart. In Japan, it reached number 19 on the Oricon Singles Chart and spent 16 weeks in that chart. It reached number 1 on the Japanese foreign singles chart and won the Gold Award at the 9th Tokyo Music Festival in 1980. In Japan, the album was actually titled Body Language and featured different cover art, but only contained twelve tracks compared to the sixteen songs on Full House. Later in 1980, Full House was released in Japan, again with different cover art to both of the previous releases, and now with fourteen tracks.

There is a cover version of the song "Body Language" (in Japanese) by Wink, whose title is "Only Lonely". It is included in the album Especially for You: Yasashisa ni Tsutsumarete and is the B-side of the single "Boys Don't Cry".
