= Monster (Hugh Cornwell album) =

Studio album by Hugh Cornwell
- Released: 5 October 2018
- Recorded: 2017–2018
- Genre: Rock
- Length: 72:22
- Label: Sony
- Producer: Hugh Cornwell

Hugh Cornwell chronology
This Time It's Personal (with John Cooper Clarke) (2016)	Monster (2018)	Moments of Madness (2022)

Singles from Monster
- 1. "Monster" Released: 23 August 2018; 2. "Pure Evel" Released: 23 August 2018

Monster is the ninth studio album by the English musician Hugh Cornwell, released on 5 October 2018 by Sony Music. It is a concept album, which celebrates the lives of 10 influential, and in some cases controversial, figures from the 20th century, including Lou Reed, Evel Knievel and Benito Mussolini. The release comes with a companion disc (both on CD and vinyl) named Restoration, which features re-recorded acoustic versions of songs from Cornwell's former band the Stranglers.

The album reached No. 62 in the UK Albums Chart in October 2018.

== Background and content ==
Recording

Hugh Cornwell recorded Monster at his home studio with engineer Phil Andrews, playing most of the instruments himself. Originally conceived as demos, the tracks were however deemed sounding almost like masters by his management, who felt that Cornwell and Andrews should finish the album without bringing in a drummer and a bass player. Consequently, the two worked on finishing touches, including improving the drum programming.

In 2016, Cornwell released the This Time It's Personal album with post-punk poet John Cooper Clarke. Clarke's back catalogue is on Sony Music, who ended up releasing their collaboration. Cornwell got on well with Sony, so when Monster was ready, the label showed interest, and Cornwell signed a deal with them. Signing with Sony marked Cornwell's return to the label, where the Stranglers were signed during most of the 1980s, releasing four studio albums through Sony's Epic Records.

Songs

When Cornwell's mother Winifred died at the age of 98 in the early 2010s, he decided to celebrate her in the song "La Grande Dame." "My mother was a legend," he said, "if only in our little world." According to Cornwell, she was a local celebrity among the swimmers at the ladies open air pond on Hampstead Heath, because she would go swimming five or six times a day throughout the year. "She was also the villain of the family... and kept us all in line," he said. "[But] then she mellowed out a bit as I got a bit older and I grew to be very, very, very fond of her." Because she was half French, the title "La Grande Dame" suggested itself to Cornwell. This became the starting point for writing more songs about real people, both famous and infamous, who have "defied categorisation," according to Cornwell. "They are all people that I am interested in," he said. "I don’t know if they have anything in common beyond being remarkable people." Originally, it was not going to be an album all about the people who have influenced him, "it just turned out like that," he said. The album was originally going to be called La Grande Dame, but for commercial reasons it got changed.

The album's opening track, "Pure Evel", is about 1970s motorcycle stunt performer Evel Knievel. Cornwell got the idea of writing about Knievel after he had watched the 1971 film Evel Knievel and realized that no one had ever written a song about him. "He is such a big figure with a huge personality," Cornwell said. "So that was the second song that came along. And from that moment it slowly built up like that." 1940s Hollywood actress Hedy Lamarr is the subject of "The Most Beautiful Girl In Hollywood", and "Mosin'" is a tribute to American jazz and blues pianist, singer, and songwriter Mose Allison, one of Cornwell's musical idols. Cornwell had hoped that Allison would play on the track, but his death in 2016 prevented that from happening. "Mr. Leather" is about an aborted meeting between Lou Reed and Cornwell in New York City a couple of years before Reed's death in 2013. The dinner date between the two had to be cancelled when both were struck down with flu. "I'd never met him and being one of my heroes I'd have loved to," Cornwell said. The song is as much about New York as it is about the music of Reed and the Velvet Underground. American entertainer and comedic actor Phil Silvers, who created the character Sgt. Bilko for the 1950s sitcom The Phil Silvers Show, is the subject of "Bilko". "I was brought up on The Phil Silvers Show; it was a constant source of pleasure for me," Cornwell said.

"Robert" was written and recorded before Zimbabwean President Robert Mugabe was ousted from in a coup in late 2017. A controversial figure, Mugabe was praised by some as a revolutionary hero, and accused by others of being a dictator. "When Mugabe started out, he was a young revolutionary who was rebelling against something that he didn’t believe in," Cornwell said. "He believed in what he thought was better for the people and look what happened there." The title track pays tribute to the work of animator and special effects creator Ray Harryhausen, who Cornwell called "ground-breaking and so influential." "Attack of the Major Sevens" is not about a person, but about a chord. When Cornwell recorded This Time It's Personal with John Cooper Clarke, one of the album's tracks was a re-make of American songwriter Jimmy Webb's "MacArthur Park". This led to Cornwell writing "Attack of the Major Sevens." "I've known about major seven chords for years, but when we covered "MacArthur Park" I realised how powerful they are, and that they are an emotional trigger unlike any other chord... heartbreak, sadness, nostalgia... That's why I got the idea to write a song based around Jimmy Webb's songs." Cornwell had thought of the title "Duce Coochie Man" about 10 years earlier, but could not find the right opportunity to write a song about Benito "Il Duce" Mussolini. "So, when this album turned up, I thought "that's it, this is the moment for bringing out "Duce Coochie Man"," he said.

While most of the tracks are about heroic figures, "Robert" and "Duce Coochie Man" portray men who most would consider villains. Cornwell has stated that they are examples of how power corrupts, and that he tried to give them a good brief by imagining when they first started out on their chosen paths, motivated to do some good for their countries.

Restoration bonus disc

It was Sony's idea to include some sort of Stranglers bonus material with Monster to bring in the Stranglers fans. Cornwell suggested an acoustic album recorded in the studio, but he did not want to do a "greatest hits" of the band. Instead, he decided to create a dark acoustic album. "Over the years I have been playing the odd acoustic tour every two years or so, and in the process of doing that, I have discovered that some of the old catalogue works better than others acoustically. So that is how I based my choices," Cornwell said. Jethro Tull's Ian Anderson featured on two tracks playing flute.

== Critical reception ==
Professional ratings
Review scores
Source	Rating
Liverpool Sound and Vision	4/5 stars
The Spill Magazine	4/5 stars

Aaron Badgley of The Spill Magazine did not feel that Cornwell was breaking new ground musically with Monster, but still called him a "genius," writing, "Monster is just another example of his brilliant work... he was always a storyteller, stories that also were a personal reflection of him. Monster is a continuation in that direction and a very successful one at that." Badgley viewed the album as "perhaps [Cornwell's] strongest solo album since 1997's Guilty." He called the bonus disc Restoration "interesting, but far from essential."

== Track listing ==
All tracks are written by Hugh Cornwell.

No.	Title	Length
1.	"Pure Evel"	4:42
2.	"La Grande Dame"	3:40
3.	"The Most Beautiful Girl in Hollywood"	2:48
4.	"Mosin'"	3:15
5.	"Mr. Leather"	4:44
6.	"Bilko"	5:02
7.	"Robert"	3:30
8.	"Monster"	3:38
9.	"Attack of the Major Sevens"	3:27
10.	"Duce Coochie Man"	4:27
Total length:		39:13

Bonus disc – Restoration

All tracks are written by Cornwell, Jean-Jacques Burnel, Dave Greenfield and Jet Black.

No.	Title	Length
1.	"Outside Tokyo" (originally from Black and White, 1978)	2:25
2.	"Let Me Down Easy" (originally from Aural Sculpture, 1984)	3:27
3.	"Souls" (originally from Aural Sculpture)	2:37
4.	"Don't Bring Harry" (originally from The Raven, 1979)	4:52
5.	"Goodbye Toulouse" (originally from Rattus Norvegicus, 1977)	2:59
6.	"Ships That Pass in the Night" (originally from Feline, 1983)	3:06
7.	"Never Say Goodbye" (originally from Feline)	3:09
8.	"No More Heroes" (originally from No More Heroes, 1977)	3:34
9.	"Big in America" (originally from Dreamtime, 1986)	2:29
10.	"Always the Sun" (originally from Dreamtime)	4:31
Total length:		33:09

== Personnel ==
Credits adapted from the album liner notes.

Musicians

- Hugh Cornwell – vocals, guitar, bass, drum programming, additional percussion
- Phil Andrews – drum programming, piano ("Let Me Down Easy"), mandolin ("Don't Bring Harry"), handclaps ("Let Me Down Easy")
- Katie Elliot – recorder ("Duce Coochie Man")
- Ian Anderson – flute ("Souls", "Ships That Pass in the Night")
- Ted Benham – vibraphone ("Goodbye Toulouse", "Big in America"), wood block ("Never Say Goodbye")

Technical

- Hugh Cornwell – producer, mixing
- Phil Andrews – engineer, mixing
- Matt Colton – mastering (disc 1)
- Barry "Bazza" Grint – mastering (disc 2)
- Alison Fielding – design
- Gas Associates – design
- Scott Minshall – design
- Bertrand Fevre – photography

== Charts ==
Chart (2018)	Peak Position
UK Albums (OCC)	62
