= The Night Out Theatre Restaurant =

Former cabaret in Birmingham, England

Coordinates: 52.4731°N 1.9002°W

The Night Out Theatre Restaurant in Horsefair, Birmingham, was one of the country's premier cabaret venues throughout the 1970s and early 1980s.

== Building ==
The venue was custom built, with interior design by Todd Kingman. A 1400-seat auditorium, with all seats dining, was similar in style to the Moulin Rouge but more glitzy.

The kitchen served an average of 1000 meals per night, six nights a week, and was split into two in later years, with 'Kitchen 2' dealing exclusively with the a-la-carte part of the extensive menu.

== History ==
The venue was owned and operated by Trust House Forte (THF), Forte Group later 'Entam Leisure' (part of the Forte Group), then 'First Leisure', which also controlled London's Talk of the Town and The Golden Garter in Manchester.

The Night Out first opened in April 1975. The First General Manager was Clive Preston, later succeeded by Paul Lillicrap.

In the late 1970s Eddie Gray and Patti Sommers left The Night Out and the venue's musical directorship came under the late Roger Rae. Successive Stage Directors were Dave Goddard, Tony Jover, Cliff Dix and finally Martin Tasker.

== Performers ==
When it opened in 1975 the venue had a house band under Eddie Gray with lead singer Patti Sommers. The first headline act to appear was Dana.

The original resident group was Moonlight, followed by Misty Morning, Delta Dawn, and finally Dinsdale from 1978 through to the end.

The first resident compere was Scott Paul Young, who was followed by Ricki Disoni, and Frank Patterson.

The venue featured a range of major star artists during its existence, had Princess Anne in its audience on one occasion, was the host venue for the 1981 Eurovision broadcast of Miss Europe and provided a nightly 'five hours non-stop show'.

The nightly 'House Show' which preceded the top of the bill act was staged and choreographed by Jean Clarke and produced by David Wiseman but was eventually scrapped in a cost-cutting exercise that finally led to the venue becoming a disco (The Dome).

Notable performers included:-

- The Drifters
- Cannon and Ball
- Madeline Bell
- Val Doonican
- The Dooleys
- The Krankies
- Roy Orbison
- Charles Aznavour
- Freddie Starr
- Tom O'Connor
- Lulu (singer)
- The Hollies
- Tony Christie
- Jack Jones
- Wall Street crash
- David Essex
- The New Vaudeville Band
- Sacha Distel
- The Grumbleweeds
- Johnny Dankworth and Cleo Laine
- The Nolans
- Harry Secombe
- Labbi Siffre
- Gene Pitney
- Odyssey
- Marti Caine
- Jim Davidson
- Little and Large
- The Stylistics
- The Barron Knights
- Brotherhood of Man
- Showaddywaddy
- Hot Gossip
- The Three Degrees
- Darts
- Danny La Rue
- Rolf Harris
- Des O'Connor
- Keith Chegwin
- Mike Yarwood
- Grace Kennedy
- Bob Monkhouse
- Jimmy Tarbuck
- Kenny Lynch
- Bucks Fizz
- Cilla Black
- Michael Bentine
- Roger De Courcey
- The Osmond Brothers
