= Secrets (The Dooleys album) =

Studio album by The Dooleys
- Released: October 1981
- Genres: Pop, MOR
- Length: 42.15
- Label: GTO Records
- Producers: Barry Blue, The Dooleys

The Dooleys chronology
Full House (1980)	Secrets (1981)	In Car Stereo (1983)

Secrets is a 1981 album by the British pop group The Dooleys, released on GTO Records. It was their final album in the UK.

== Background ==
By late 1981, the group had released two consecutive flop singles, "In a Riddle" from the previous album and "Taken at the Flood", a stand-alone single, which wasn't considered good enough for inclusion on this album. The group spent the year recording this album with new producer, former pop singer Barry Blue. In September, the lead single "And I Wish" was released. An upbeat pop song, it became their first chart entry for a year, but only managed to reach No.52. The album was released soon after. Their record label, GTO Records was at the time being taken over by Epic Records and promotion for the album suffered. Secrets failed to chart, as did the follow-up single "The Dancer", which was released by Epic. In Japan, a third single was released; "Tokyo Feeling". Track "Tip of My Tongue" (co-written by Lynsey De Paul) had previously been recorded by Barry Blue himself and also as a single by Liquid Gold's Ellie Hope, while track "Love Me, Love Me Do" had been recorded (but never released) a year earlier by pop duo Dollar as "Living Each Day for You".

Soon after the album's release three members of the group departed to live in South Africa and a new female singer was employed, making the group now a six-piece. Some new tracks were recorded and released along with several songs from this album in Germany in 1982, where "And I Wish" had been a hit. The album was titled And I Wish there, while it was renamed The Dancer in Japan, where they had experienced some success over the past two years.

The group released two more singles in the UK and did record another album in 1983, but this was only released in Japan. The single, "And I Wish" remains The Dooleys final UK chart entry.

Secrets was released on compact disc by Cherry Red Records in May 2013 in a double-pack with their previous album, Full House. This had a number of bonus tracks, including two non-album singles released around this time.

== Track listing ==
Side one

1. "And I Wish" (Blue / Smith) 3.41
2. "The Dancer" (Blue / Smith) 3.02
3. "Tip of My Tongue" (Blue / De Paul) 3.40
4. "What You Got" (Blue / Smith) 3.34
5. "Love Trap" (The Dooleys) 3.35
6. "Love Me, Love Me Do" (Bowkett) 3.11

Side two

1. "Tokyo Feeling" (Blue / Smith) 3.31
2. "One Way Loving" (The Dooleys / Dixie) 3.09
3. "In Real Life" (The Dooleys / Dixie) 3.40
4. "Sooner or Later" (The Dooleys) 3.26
5. "Will We Still Be Dancing" (Blue) 3.40
6. "Secrets" (The Dooleys / Dixie) 4.06

CD bonus tracks

1. "Taken at the Flood" (Jordan) 4.03 [non-LP A-side single, UK, 1981]
2. "Face in the Crowd" (The Dooleys) 3.21 [non-LP B-side single, UK, 1981]
3. "Will You or Won't You" (Myers / Puzey) 3.09 [non-LP A-side single, UK, 1982]
4. "Danger Signs" (Bogan / Dixie / Dooley / Dooley) 3.17 [non-LP B-side single, UK, 1982]
5. "Only the Music's Changed" (The Dooleys) 3.19 [from 'Pop Fantasia' LP, Japan, 1980]
6. "How am I Ever Gonna Live it Down" (Myers / Findon / Puzey) 3.13 [from 'Pop Fantasia' LP, Japan, 1980]
7. "A Little Bit Special" (Myers / Findon / Puzey) 3.06 [from 'Pop Fantasia' LP, Japan, 1980]
8. "Love Patrol (Extended Version)" (Myers / Findon / Puzey) 4.36 [from 12-inch single, Japan, 1980]

== Personnel ==
- Jim Dooley - vocals
- Anne Dooley - vocals
- Kathy Dooley - vocals
- John Dooley - guitar
- Frank Dooley - guitar
- Helen Dooley - keyboards
- Bob Walsh - bass guitar
- Alan Bogan - drums
- John 'Dixie' Taggart, Robin Smith, Graham Jarvis, Paul Westwood - additional musicians
- Barry Blue - producer
- The Dooleys - producer on "Love Trap", "One Way Loving", "In Real Life" and "Sooner or Later"
- Robin Smith - arranger
- John Cameron - arranger on "Love Me, Love Me Do"
- Graham Dixon - engineer
- Steve Levine - engineer
- Recorded at Nova Studios, Utopia Studios and CBS Studios in London, Pennine Studios in Oldham
