= Michael Myers (songwriter) =

- Also known as: Mike Myers
- Born: Michael Stanley Myers
- Website: www.mikesmyers.com

Michael Myers is a songwriter and music producer. During his career, he has written hits for The Dooleys, The Nolans and Billy Ocean.

== Background ==
As a songwriter and producer, Myers went under the Tasty Music name. He established the MCA affiliated music publisher, Tasty Music Publishing in the 1980s. In early 1988, he set up the Production Workshop studio. The studio was primarily for the work by Tasty Music. However, with its range of equipment which included a Fostex B16 recorder and an A80, it was used by artists such as Robin Millar, Hugh Jones and Black. According to the July 1988 issue of Music Technology magazine, Myers had been involved in the creation twenty-nine major hits. Artists that he has worked with include Billy Ocean, Nick Heywood, the Nolans and Bucks Fizz. A songwriter that Myers had worked with on multiple occasions was Ben Findon.

Myers is also an Ivor Novello Award nominee. By 2011, he was responsible for 75 single and album hits.

== Career ==
With Billy Ocean and Ben Findon he wrote "Stop Me (If You've Heard It All Before)". It became a hit for Ocean in 1976, peaking at no. 12 in the UK.

Myers and Ben Findon "Love of My Life" for The Dooleys which was produced by Ben Findon. It reached No.9 in the UK charts in 1977. With Bob Puzey and Findon he wrote "I'm in the Mood for Dancing" for The Nolan Sisters. The single got to no. 3 in the UK charts.

In 1980, two songs that he co-wrote with Ben Findon and Bob Puzey got to no. 12 and 9 in the UK charts. They were "Don't Make Waves" and "Gotta Pull Myself Together", both by The Nolans. In 1981, "Attention to Me", another hit for The Nolans which was written by himself with Ben Findon and Bob Puzey got to no. 9 in the UK charts.

In 1983, Myers came into contact with singer Haywoode. He took her tapes to CBS and they were offered a deal. Two songs that Myers co-produced with Lynton Naiff, "A Time Like This" and "I Can't Let You Go" were chart hits.

Myers and Ben Findon wrote "Sexy Music" for The Nolans. It won the top prize at the 1981 Tokyo Music Festival.
