= The Best of The Dooleys =

Greatest hits album by The Dooleys
- Released: June 1979
- Recorded: 1977–1979
- Genre: Pop, MOR
- Length: 39.19
- Label: GTO Records
- Producer: Ben Findon

The Dooleys chronology
| Dooleys (1978) | The Best of The Dooleys (1979) | The Chosen Few (1979) |

Professional ratings
Review scores
| Source | Rating |
|---|---|
| Music Week | 4/4 stars |

The Best of The Dooleys is the second UK album by pop group The Dooleys. It was their first compilation album and included their five top 30 singles up to this point. It became their biggest-selling album, peaking at No.6 in the UK.

== Background ==
By mid 1979, The Dooleys had scored six hit singles in the UK. The latest single, "Wanted" was the biggest hit of their career and so GTO Records released a compilation containing all the singles so far. The album proved to be a success - the biggest of the group's career, peaking at No.6 in the album charts. The album contained eight tracks from their previous album and four new songs - two of which were single releases. One of the new tracks, "Stand Up Like a Man" had originally been performed by The Shadows in the heats to the Eurovision Song Contest 1975.

Singles included on the album are; "Hands Across the Sea" (a re-recording), "Think I'm Gonna Fall in Love With You", "Love of My life", "Don't Take It Lyin' Down", "A Rose Has to Die", "Honey I'm Lost" and "Wanted". This was the first album by the group to feature youngest sister Helen Dooley who had joined the line-up early in the year, making the group an octet.

In October 2005, a compilation CD of the group was released, containing nine of this album's 12 tracks. Since then all the tracks have been released on CD on re-issues of their original albums.

== Track listing ==
Side One

1. "Wanted" (Findon / Myers / Puzey) 3.29
2. "Love of My Life" (Findon / Myers) 3.06
3. "A Rose Has to Die" (Findon) 2.43
4. "Hands Across the Sea" (Findon / Wilkins) 3.23
5. "Stand Up Like a Man" (Findon / Myers) 4.10
6. "Sad Old Spanish Guitar" (Findon / Puzey) 3.12

Side Two

1. "Think I'm Gonna Fall in Love With You" (Findon / Myers) 3.04
2. "Honey I'm Lost" (Findon / Myers) 3.03
3. "Don't Take It Lyin' Down" (Findon / Myers) 3.24
4. "What's Gonna Happen to Our Love" (Findon / Wilkins) 3.02
5. "Stone Walls" (Findon / Wilkins) 3.03
6. "Don't Let Me Be the Last to Know" (Findon / Myers) 3.40

== Personnel ==
- Jim Dooley - vocals, keyboards
- Anne Dooley - vocals
- Kathy Dooley - vocals
- John Dooley - Guitar and vocals
- Frank Dooley - Guitar and vocals
- Bob Walsh - Bass guitar
- Alan Bogan - Drums
- Helen Dooley - Keyboards and vocals (tracks 1, 5, 6 and 8)
- Ben Findon - Producer
- Mike Myers - Assistant producer
- Tom Parker - Orchestrations
- Recorded at Morgan Studios, London
