= This Time It's Personal (John Cooper Clarke and Hugh Cornwell album) =

Studio album by John Cooper Clarke and Hugh Cornwell
- Released: 14 October 2016
- Genre: Rock and roll
- Length: 33:51
- Label: Sony
- Producer: Hugh Cornwell

John Cooper Clarke chronology
Anthologia (2015)	This Time It's Personal (2016)	The Luckiest Guy Alive (2018)

Hugh Cornwell chronology
The Fall and Rise of Hugh Cornwell (2015)	This Time It's Personal (2016)	Monster (2018)

Singles from This Time It's Personal
- 1. "MacArthur Park" Released: 13 July 2016; 2. "Johnny Remember Me" Released: 15 October 2016

This Time It's Personal is a covers album by the English performance poet John Cooper Clarke, and the former vocalist and guitarist of the Stranglers, Hugh Cornwell. It was released on 14 October 2016 by Sony. The album features songs that were important to Clarke and Cornwell in their youth, and includes tracks by artists and songwriters such as Ricky Nelson, Ritchie Valens, Conway Twitty, Lieber and Stoller and Jimmy Webb. This Time It's Personal marks Clarke's singing debut on an album. It was Clarke's first album release since 1982's Zip Style Method.

== Background ==
The album was conceived by Hugh Cornwell, when drunk and listening to "MacArthur Park", he wondered what the song would sound like if Clarke had sung it. Having spent dinner with Clarke weeks before, he rang him up and asked him if he was interested. Clarke was receptive to the idea, and after covering "MacArthur Park", the two decided to make an album of songs from their youth, with Clarke on vocals and Cornwell on guitars. "This is the music Hugh and I listened to at a similar age, the music we heard on radio growing up," Clarke said in 2017. "Not everyone had a record player, so radio was much more important then and we wanted to capture that."

This Time It's Personal marks Clarke's singing debut on an album, and his first album release since 1982's Zip Style Method.

== Release ==
The album was released on 14 October 2016 by Sony.

To support the album's release, the duo undertook a small UK tour during November and December 2016.

== Critical reception ==
Professional ratings
Review scores
Source	Rating
The Arts Desk	4/5 stars
The Music	3.5/5 stars

The Arts Desk, rating the album 4 stars out of 5, called the album "great 20th-century pop at its shortest, sweetest, and lingering best... Warm, rich and full of heart." Clarke's delivery, they felt, "works perfectly against the skeletal, echoey guitars of Cornwell," adding, "there's a sense of austere clarity and simplicity, as opposed to indulgence or nostalgia."

The Music gave 3.5 stars out of 5, saying, "Doctor's unashamedly Manchester nasal tones, which can be surprisingly melodic at times, are delivered against Cornwall's dense guitar noise. The results can be almost bebop jazz – or karaoke night at The Salford Workers Club. The kind-of-sweet ("It's Only Make Believe") collides with the dryly comical ("Love Potion No 9"). Then there's a sprawling ramble at "MacArthur Park", which is either towering genius or towering folly – but, like the whole project, probably somewhere between the two."

The Louder Than War website called it "a modern masterpiece" and "one of the more remarkable albums in recent history." They felt that the album shows "an impressive ability" to assemble these songs and "mastermind an album of modern interpretations." Cornwell's production skills "demonstrate a rare talent and are all the more impressive for the challenge of the project." Louder Than War said of Clarke's vocal performance: "He brings sensitivity and affection for the songs he is singing, and his distinctive vocals... add the vital touch of originality... the fact that [the songs] are well-known means it is not so easy to take liberties with them, but the tracks chosen are respectfully, even lovingly, delivered and this is clearly a labour of love for both men."

== Track listing ==
No.	Title	Writer(s)	Original artist	Length
1.	"It's Only Make Believe"	Conway Twitty, Jack Nance	Conway Twitty	2:59
2.	"Way Down Yonder in New Orleans"	John Turner Layton Jr., Henry Creamer	from the Broadway production Spice of 1922; later recorded by the Peerless Quartet, Blossom Seeley and Paul Whiteman	2:25
3.	"Spanish Harlem"	Jerry Leiber, Phil Spector	Ben E. King	3:02
4.	"Johnny Remember Me"	Geoff Goddard	John Leyton	3:17
5.	"MacArthur Park"	Jimmy Webb	Richard Harris	6:20
6.	"She's a Woman"	Jerry Leiber, Mike Stoller	Christine Kittrell	2:36
7.	"Donna"	Ritchie Valens	Ritchie Valens	3:59
8.	"Jezebel"	Wayne Shanklin	Frankie Laine	3:39
9.	"Love Potion No. 9"	Jerry Leiber, Mike Stoller	The Clovers	2:57
10.	"Sweeter Than You"	Baker Knight	Ricky Nelson	4:37
Total length:				33:51

== Personnel ==
The main performers on the album are:

- Dr John Cooper Clarke – vocals
- Hugh Cornwell – guitar, drum programming, backing vocals (track 7)

Other musicians on the album include:

- Phil Andrews – keyboards, programming, drum programming, accordion (track 10)
- Ian Anderson – flute (track 5)
- Lettie Maclean – backing vocals (track 4)
- Ben Waghorn – saxophone (tracks 1, 2)
- Hilary Kops – trumpet (tracks 2, 3)

Technical crew include:

- Hugh Cornwell – producer, mixing
- Phil Andrews – engineer, mixing
- Scott Minshall – design
- Donal Whelan – mastering
- Dean Chalkley – photography
- Joanna Kalli – project manager
