= Wolf (Hugh Cornwell album) =

Studio album by Hugh Cornwell
- Released: June 1988
- Studio: Crescent Studios, Bath; Eden Studios, Chiswick; Soundlab Studios, Loughton, Essex
- Genre: Alternative rock; post-punk
- Length: 40:30
- Label: Virgin
- Producer: Ian Ritchie; Hugh Cornwell; Clive Langer; Alan Winstanley

Hugh Cornwell chronology
Nosferatu (1979)	Wolf (1988)	CCW (1992)

Singles from Wolf
- 1. "Another Kind of Love" Released: April 1988; 2. "Dreaming Again" Released: July 1988

Wolf is the debut solo studio album by the English musician Hugh Cornwell, released in June 1988 on Virgin Records and produced by Cornwell and Ian Ritchie, with additional production on two tracks by Clive Langer and Alan Winstanley. The other musicians involved included drummers Graham Broad and Manny Elias, keyboardists Jools Holland and Simon Clark, brass players Don Weller, Pete Thoms, Steve Dawson and Alex Gifford, singer Haywoode, and guitarist Gus Isadore.

== Reception ==
Cornwell was still in the Stranglers when Wolf was released; writing in Trouser Press Record Guides, Ira Robbins described the album as "a dull stab at playing lightweight dance-pop outside the Stranglers' sphere" adding that it "contains nothing the Stranglers couldn't have done just as well". That opinion was shared by The Encyclopedia of Popular Music, which described it as "a hugely disappointing affair, a limp attempt to carve a pop niche".

Though the album failed to chart, the single "Another Kind of Love", released in September 1988, reached No. 11 on the US Alternative charts. The accompanying music video was directed by the acclaimed surrealist film maker Jan Švankmajer. The Los Angeles Times described the combination as a "fun song and a visual treat". Another review of the live action/stop motion clip suggests that it is the only music video made by Švankmajer, though his work is known to have strongly influenced the Brothers Quay, who worked on the video for Peter Gabriel's "Sledgehammer" two years before.

Interviewed in February 1998, Cornwell claimed that a number of tracks on Wolf had been so well received by American radio stations that Virgin US had wanted him to go over on tour to promote the album. It was arranged for him to support A Flock of Seagulls, who had taken their name from a Stranglers song and offered to act as his backing band as well as playing their own greatest hits set, but the tour fell through when Cornwell was sacked by Virgin UK. Cornwell was in New York for promotional interviews at the time.

Wolf was re-released in the United States on Velvel Records in December 1999 (Velvel means 'wolf' in Yiddish). The same label had already released and re-released a number of Cornwell's other albums during the course of the year.

== Track listing ==
All tracks composed by Hugh Cornwell

Wolf
No.	Title	Length
1.	"Another Kind of Love"	3:33
2.	"Cherry Rare"	4:09
3.	"Never Never"	3:37
4.	"Real Slow"	3:54
5.	"Break of Dawn"	4:30
6.	"Clubland"	4:11
7.	"Dreaming Again"	4:10
8.	"Decadance"	4:15
9.	"All the Tea in China"	2:49
10.	"Getting Involved"	5:22

== Personnel ==
Credits adapted from the album liner notes.

- Hugh Cornwell – vocals, guitar, keyboards, percussion programming (1)
- Gus Isidore – lead guitar (2, 6, 7)
- Clive Langer – keyboards (3)
- Jools Holland – piano (2), organ (7)
- Ian Ritchie – keyboard, bass and drum programming (2, 4–8, 10), keyboards (6, 8, 9), saxophone (2, 6, 8)
- Simon Clark – bass programming (1), keyboard programming (3)
- Manny Elias – drums and drum programming (1–3, 6), percussion (5)
- Chris Sheldon – percussion (4)
- Graham Broad – drums (8, 10), percussion (7)
- Don Weller – baritone saxophone (1)
- Alex Gifford – saxophone (4)
- Steve Dawson – trumpet (8)
- Pete Thoms – trombone (8)
- Melanie Newman – "wolf" whistle (6)
- Haywoode – backing vocals (2, 5, 6, 10)

Technical

- Hugh Cornwell – producer (1–10)
- Ian Ritchie – producer (2, 4–10)
- Clive Langer – producer (1, 3)
- Alan Winstanley – producer, engineer, mixing (1, 3)
- Chris Sheldon – engineer (2, 4–10), mixing (2, 5, 7–9)
- Andy Wallace – mixing (7, 10)
- Michael Hutchinson – mixing (4)
- Denis Blackham – mastering
- Jay Willis – US mastering
- Assorted iMaGes – cover design
- Mike Owen – cover photography

== Production information ==
- 1-7, 10 recorded at Crescent Studios, Bath
- 8 recorded at Eden Studios, London
- 9 recorded at Soundlab Studios, Loughton, Essex and Crescent Studios
- 1, 3 mixed at Westside Studios, London
- 2, 5, 7 mixed at Odyssey Studios, London
- 4 mixed at Unique Recording Studios, New York
- 6, 10 mixed at Electric Lady Studios, New York
- 8 mixed at Eden Studios, London
- 9 mixed at Crescent Studios, Bath

== Release history ==
Region	Date	Label	Format	Catalogue
United Kingdom	June 1988	Virgin Records	Vinyl	V 2420
United Kingdom	June 1988	Virgin Records	Cassette	V 2420
United Kingdom	June 1988	Virgin Records	CD	CDV 2420
Europe	June 1988	Virgin (France) Records	Vinyl	124201
United States	1988	Virgin (USA) Records	Vinyl	790947-1
United States	1988	Virgin (USA) Records	CD	790947-2
