= Beyond Elysian Fields =

Studio album by Hugh Cornwell
- Released: 4 October 2004
- Recorded: 2003
- Studios: Looking Glass, New York; Truck Farm, New Orleans
- Genres: Alternative rock; post-punk
- Length: 43:29
- Label: Invisible Hands Music
- Producers: Tony Visconti; Danny Kadar

Hugh Cornwell chronology
In the Dock (2003)	Beyond Elysian Fields (2004)	Hooverdam (2008)

Beyond Elysian Fields is the sixth studio album by Hugh Cornwell, released by Invisible Hands Music on 4 October 2004 in the UK, with a worldwide release in 2005. It was produced by Tony Visconti and Danny Kadar.

The album title refers to Elysian Fields Avenue in New Orleans.

== Critical reception ==
Beyond Elysian Fields
Review scores
Source	Rating
Uncut	1.5/5 stars

Adam Morton of The Age complimented Cornwell's "clipped, dry delivery" on the songs "Under Her Spell" and "Beauty on the Beach", but added that "melodies wane and lyrics become laboured on later tracks" such as "24/7". Helen Wright of musicOMH described the album as "something like a cross between [Bob] Dylan and Dire Straits at their best ... with a dash of the Traveling Wilburys for good measure." Wright also cautioned, "If you preferred the early Stranglers you'll probably hate this album." Graham Rockingham The Hamilton Spectator wrote, "Beyond Elysian Fields doesn't contain the in-your-face attitude of Stranglers' songs like "Peaches", "Grip" or "Hangin' Around" ... but it does contain that sardonic sense of humor and unmistakable voice. Cornwell's songwriting ventures into all sorts of unexpected territory."

== Track listing ==
All tracks are written by Hugh Cornwell.

No.	Title	Length
1.	"Land of a Thousand Kisses"	4:55
2.	"Cadiz"	4:13
3.	"Do Right Bayou"	4:21
4.	"Under Her Spell"	3:13
5.	"Beauty on the Beach"	3:41
6.	"The Story of Harry Power"	4:17
7.	"24/7"	3:47
8.	"Mr.Big"	2:53
9.	"Picked Up by the Wind"	3:10
10.	"I Don`t Mind"	3:01
11.	"Henry Moore"	6:01

== Personnel ==
Credits adapted from the album liner notes.

- Hugh Cornwell - vocals, electric and acoustic guitar, keyboards (1, 9), toy piano (11), handclaps (5)
- Steve Lawrence - bass, organ (3, 7), piano (10)
- Windsor McGilvray - drums, percussion
- Tony Visconti - recorder (2, 11), castanets (2), handclaps (5)
- Scott Bourgeois - flute (5, 6)

Technical

- Tony Visconti - producer, mixing (Looking Glass, New York)
- Danny Kadar - producer, engineer (Truck Farm, New Orleans), cover photography
- Mario J. McNulty - engineer (Looking Glass, New York)
- Chris Goulstone - mastering
- Ra - design, artwork
- Steve Double - cover photography
- Hugh Cornwell - sleeve concept

== Beyond Acoustic Fields ==
Beyond Acoustic Fields (2007), is a limited edition CD, only available on tour, performed by Cornwell with acoustic guitar and vocal only and was recorded by Tony Visconti at his New York studio Looking Glass in 2003, to give Visconti an idea of the songs before producing the full album with the band.

Track listing:

1. "Cadiz"
2. "Beauty on the Beach"
3. "The Land of a Thousand Kisses"
4. "24/7"
5. "Henry Moore"
6. "The Story of Harry Power"
7. "Picked Up by the Wind"
8. "Do Right Bayou"
9. "Under Her Spell"
