= Hugh Cornwell =

English guitarist and singer-songwriter (born 1949)

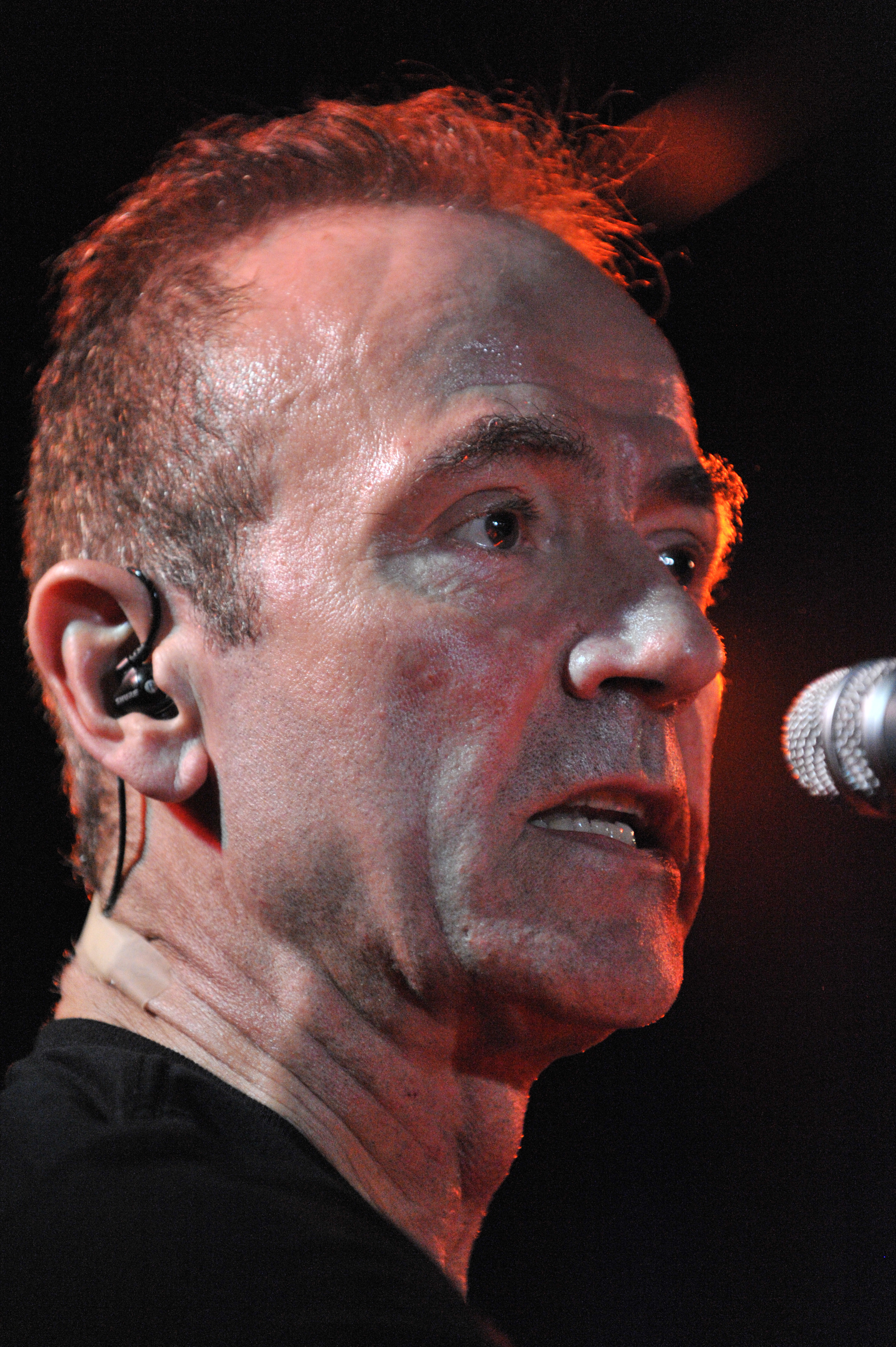
- Cornwell performing in 2010

Background information
- Born: Hugh Alan Cornwell; 28 August 1949 (age 77); Tufnell Park, North London, England
- Genres: Alternative rock; new wave; punk rock; post-punk
- Occupations: Musician; singer-songwriter; novelist
- Instruments: Vocals; guitar; bass
- Years active: 1974–present
- Labels: Virgin; Transmission; Madfish; Koch Entertainment; Track; Invisible Hands Music; Cadiz Music; Red River Entertainment; Sony; His
- Formerly of: The Stranglers
- Website: hughcornwell.com

Hugh Alan Cornwell (born 28 August 1949) is an English musician, singer-songwriter and writer, best known for being the lead vocalist and lead guitarist for the punk rock and new wave band the Stranglers from 1974 to 1990. Since leaving the Stranglers, Cornwell has recorded a further ten solo studio albums and continues to record and perform live.

== Early life and career ==
Cornwell grew up in Tufnell Park and Kentish Town. He attended William Ellis School in Highgate, where he played bass in a band with Richard Thompson, later a member of folk rock band Fairport Convention. In the late 1960s, after earning a bachelor's degree in biochemistry from the University of Bristol, he embarked on post-graduate research at Lund University in Sweden. Not long after his arrival he formed the band Johnny Sox.

== The Stranglers ==
Cornwell returned to the UK in 1974 with Johnny Sox (minus Hans Wärmling). Drummer Jet Black then joined the band. At one stage it was just Cornwell and Black, who were then joined by bassist Jean-Jacques Burnel. Guitarist, keyboardist and saxophonist Hans Wärmling, on holiday from Sweden, joined the line-up towards the end of 1974. The Johnny Sox name was dropped, with the band adopting the name the Guildford Stranglers before settling on the Stranglers.

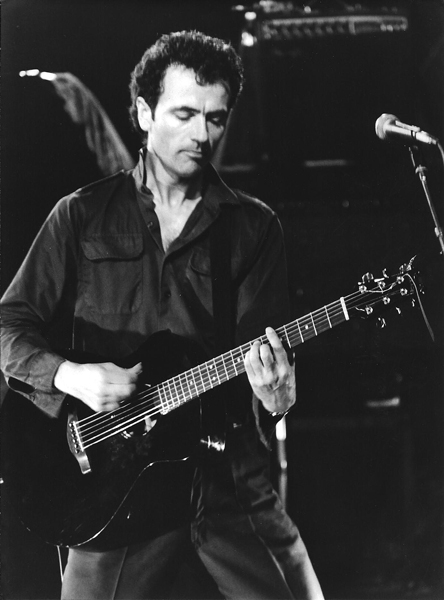
Cornwell rehearsing with the Stranglers in France, 1983

Wärmling was soon replaced by Dave Greenfield, who joined in 1975 after answering an advertisement placed in the Melody Maker magazine. Cornwell was the lead guitarist in the group and he also sang the majority of songs, with Burnel handling lead vocals on about a third of the band's songs. Years later, Burnel recalled that he often sang lyrics written by Cornwell, and vice versa, depending on "who had the best voice for that particular song".

By 1977, the group had secured a recording contract with United Artists Records. They went on to become the most commercially successful band to emerge from the UK punk scene, with numerous hit singles and record albums. Cornwell recorded his first studio album away from the group, Nosferatu in 1979, in collaboration with the drummer, Robert Williams, from Captain Beefheart's Magic Band. Cornwell's first solo studio album, Wolf (1988) was produced by Ian Ritchie with additional production on two tracks by Clive Langer and Alan Winstanley, who had engineered the first three Stranglers albums and produced their fourth studio album, The Raven (1979).

Throughout his Stranglers career, Cornwell used a Black Fender Telecaster all the way from 1974 until 1989 when he adopted a Gibson Melody Maker for the 10 Tour. He also used a Hofner Razorwood for the La Folie Tour in 1981-82 for certain songs which required distinctive sounds. He also used a bass guitar when performing "Dead Loss Angeles" on The Raven tour in 1979 and was instrumental in teaching Stranglers bassist Jean Jacques Burnel how to play bass guitar.

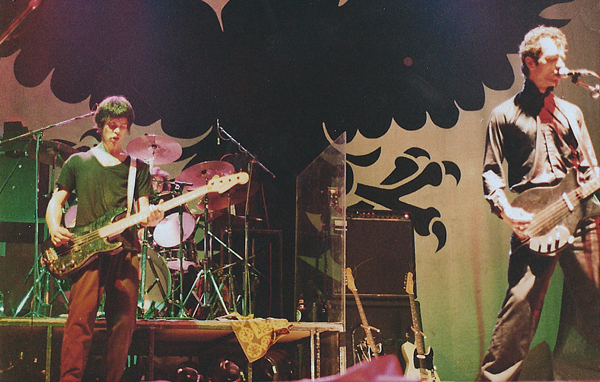
Hugh Cornwell (Right) performing on The Raven Tour in 1979, with Jean Jacques Burnel (left)

By 1990, due to growing tensions within the band and clashes with Burnel, he decided that he could go no further artistically. Following the recording of the album 10, he left the band after 16 years.

== Post-Stranglers solo career ==
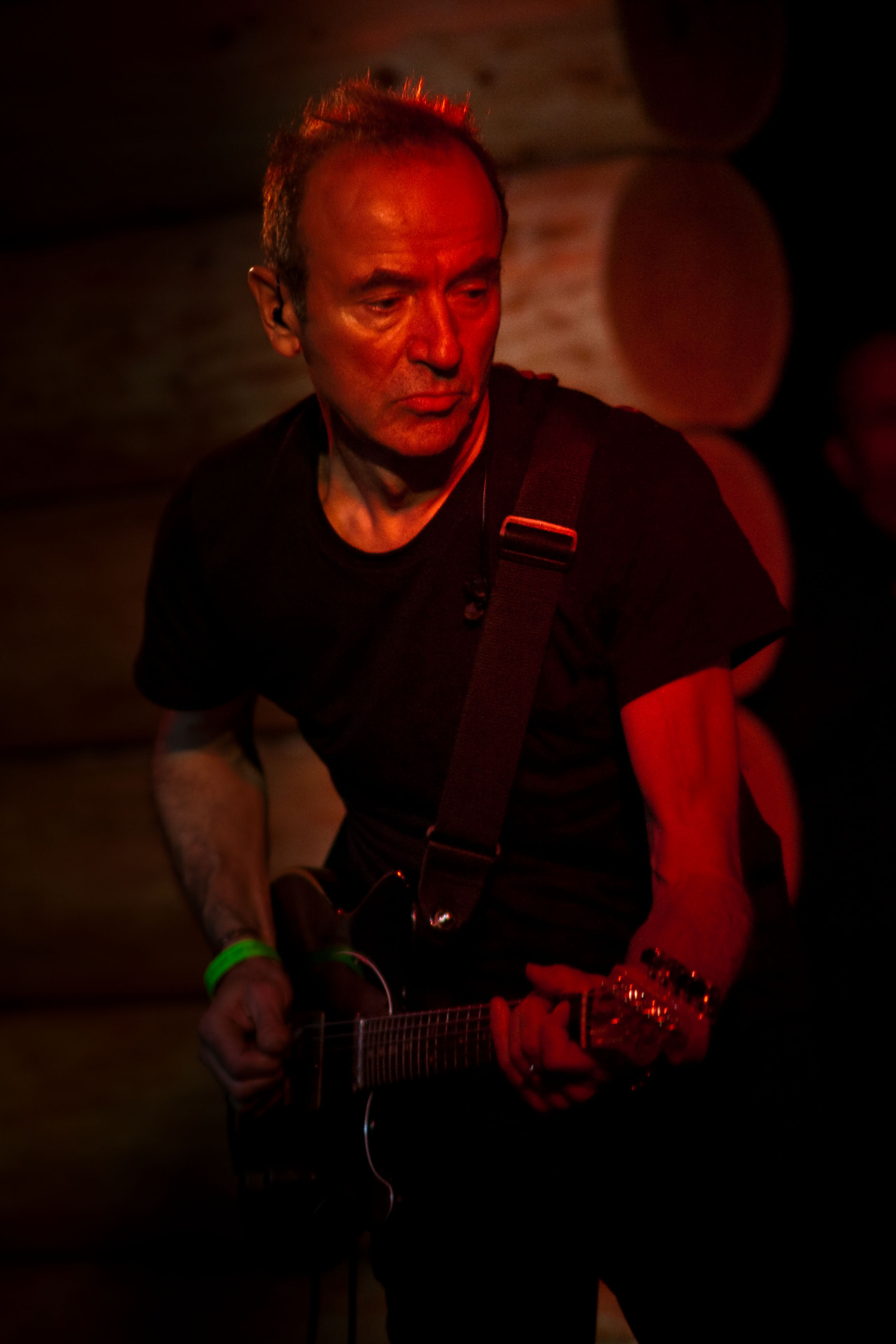
Cornwell performing in 2010

After leaving the Stranglers, Cornwell worked with Roger Cook and Andy West as CCW. Their self-titled studio album was released in 1992, with five of the ten tracks co-produced by Neil Davidge. Wired (1993), produced by Gary Langan (Art of Noise) with the exception of "Ain't It Strange", which was produced by Cornwell; Guilty (1997); Hi Fi (2000) (both produced by Laurie Latham). HiFi was released on 180g vinyl in 2020 through HIS Records Ltd with a new remix by Hugh Cornwell and a remaster. Footprints in the Desert released in 2002 is Cornwell's second "lost album" and compiles rare and unreleased tracks from the mid-1990s, that were not part of a record deal. It was recorded in Bath with James Kadsky, who engineered the album Wired (1993).

Beyond Elysian Fields (2004) was produced by Tony Visconti. MusicOMH described it as "something like a cross between [Bob] Dylan and Dire Straits at their best...with a dash of Travelling Wilburys for good measure". Beyond Elysian Fields was released on 180g vinyl in 2020 on HIS Records Ltd.

In June 2008, Cornwell followed in the footsteps of Radiohead and Nine Inch Nails by initially offering his new album, Hooverdam, as a free download on his website. The album was recorded at Toe Rag Studios with record producer, Liam Watson. It was accompanied by a film, Blueprint, which depicted the recording process of the album. Cornwell explained that the film was partly motivated by the risible quality of the DVDs accompanying contemporary CD releases. Blueprint was described as "an engrossing film that borrows from [Jean-Luc] Godard's Sympathy for the Devil and [Norman] Jewison's The Thomas Crown Affair".

The studio album Totem and Taboo followed in 2012; engineered and mixed by Steve Albini, it was described as "Cornwell's finest and most unashamedly epic moment since the punk era". Prior to a Scottish tour that year The Herald wrote "The album yields its eloquent lyrical strengths on repeated listenings: stand-out tracks include the evocative 'A Street Called Carroll', 'Love Me Slender', 'I Want One of Those', a commentary on consumerism, and, unquestionably best of all, the atmospheric, nine minute noir epic, 'In the Dead of Night', which should become a live favourite. Cornwell's forthcoming tour sees him play the new album and the Stranglers' landmark 1977 record, No More Heroes, but Totem and Taboo is strong enough on its own." A review on the Witchdoctor.co.nz website stated that "In a world or egotistic over-achieving and slack-arse under-achieving, Hugh Cornwell knows how to play it just right, and Totem & Taboo is a master class in sticking to your guns and doing what you do well".

In 2016, Cornwell collaborated with performance poet John Cooper Clarke to create the album This Time It's Personal, a collection of classic American and British pop songs from their youth. Cornwell had the idea that Clarke should apply his distinctive vocals to "MacArthur Park" and the project grew from there. Jethro Tull's Ian Anderson also makes an appearance on flute. The album was described as "a modern masterpiece from 'Punk's Progressive Alliance'" by Louder Than War.

In 2018, Cornwell signed to Sony as a solo artist and released Monster. On this album, Cornwell sang about Evel Knievel, Lou Reed, Hedy Lamarr, Benito Mussolini, Phil Silvers and many more. The title track "Monster" pays tribute to special effects wizard Ray Harryhausen, of whom George Lucas said "Without Ray Harryhausen, there would likely have been no Star Wars". Aaron Badgley of The Spill Magazine wrote that "This is perhaps his strongest solo album since 1997's Guilty, and it might be even better than that album... Cornwell is a genius and Monster is just another example of his brilliant work."

=== 2022–present ===
In 2022, Cornwell released his tenth solo studio album, Moments of Madness, on 21 October. Self-produced, with all instruments recorded by himself, the album explores themes of ageing, tattoos and the "throwaway society". The first single, "Red Rose", was released on 18 April 2022, ahead of a 21-date UK tour running from 4 November to 3 December.

In 2024, Cornwell released a live album, All the Fun of the Fair (4 October), recorded during UK shows in January that year with his long-serving band, bassist Pat Hughes and drummer Windsor McGilvray. That Autumn, he toured further UK and Ireland dates, including full-band shows in Ireland and dates with special guests EXTC.

In June 2025, Cornwell performed at Glastonbury Festival. That November, he and his band undertook the "Come and Get Some" tour, playing the 1979 album Nosferatu in full alongside Stranglers and solo material, with support from The Courettes. The tour title references a line from "Wrong Way Round," a Nosferatu track featuring Ian Dury's fairground-barker ad-libs.

In 2026, Cornwell played further festival and Nosferatu dates, including Forest Fest in County Laois, Ireland (25 July), GuilFest in Guildford (5 July) and a show at Peak Cavern ("The Devil's Arse"), Castleton, Derbyshire (15 August). In November, an acoustic tour is planned, "Never Say Goodbye," his first solo acoustic tour since 2017 and, by his own description, his last, previewing new songs from his forthcoming album.

Cornwell's next studio album, Succubus, is scheduled for release in 2027, coinciding with the 50th anniversary of The Stranglers' debut album, Rattus Norvegicus (1977).

== Film, theatre, television and podcast ==
Cornwell has an interest in acting, and has appeared in a number of productions. In the early 1980s, he appeared in Charlie's Last Stand with Bob Hoskins and Stephen Rea at the Almeida Theatre, London. He also appeared in the 1987 Peter Richardson film Eat the Rich, the award-winning BBC Screen Two series (successor to Play for Today) and in the 1995 BBC production, Rumble. He has also appeared in a number of videos and short films, including Bertrand Fèvre's L'étoile de sang.

Cornwell hosts Mr Demille FM, a podcast that takes his passion for film and explores it through interviews and episodes on careers and themes. Guests have included Debbie Harry, Brian Eno and Sir David Puttnam.

== Cricket ==
A cricket fan, Cornwell appeared on the Jamie Theakston Cricket Show on BBC Radio 5 Live in 2001. He played a live acoustic version of "(Get A) Grip (On Yourself)" with the then England batsman and guitarist Mark Butcher. Cornwell subsequently became a player with Bunbury Cricket Club, and has been a guest on "A View from the Boundary" on BBC Radio 4's Test Match Special and BBC Radio 5 Live's Yes It's the Ashes.

== Books ==
Cornwell has written six books:

- Inside Information (1980) tells of the time he spent in HM Prison Pentonville for drug possession
- The Stranglers – Song by Song (2001) guides the reader through all of the Stranglers catalogue
- A Multitude of Sins (2004) is his autobiography
- Window on the World (July 2011) ISBN 978-0-7043-7230-6 is a novel
- Arnold Drive, ISBN 978-1-78352-052-7, was published in 2014. It is a novel.
- Future Tense, is a novel published on 8 October 2020 by HIS through Amazon.

== Discography ==
=== Studio albums ===
- Wolf (1988)
- Wired (1993) (US title: First Bus to Babylon, 1999)
- Guilty (1997) (US title: Black Hair, Black Eyes, Black Suit, 1999)
- Hi Fi (2000)
- Footprints in the Desert (2002)
- Beyond Elysian Fields (2004)
- Hooverdam (2008)
- Totem and Taboo (2012)
- Monster (2018)
- Moments of Madness (2022)

=== Live albums ===
- Mayday (download: 1999, CD: 2002)
- Solo (1999) (*)
- In the Dock (2003) (*)
- Live It and Breathe It (2005) (selected highlights from People, Places, Pieces)
- Dirty Dozen (2006) (selected highlights from People, Places, Pieces)
- People, Places, Pieces - 3CD box set (2006)
- Beyond Acoustic Fields (2007) (live in-studio acoustic recording of Beyond Elysian Fields, limited edition to buy on tour only) (*)
- New Songs for King Kong - 2CD (2010)
- Anthology live acoustic performance recorded at The Lemon Tree, Aberdeen in December 2013 (*)
- Live at the Vera - 2CD (2014)
- All The Fun Of The Fair (2024)

Note: Albums marked with asterisk (*) indicate solo live performances; all others are band performances.

=== Compilation albums ===
- You're Covered (2011) (limited to 250 copies on Cornwell's 2011 tour, features covers of Cornwell's influences)
- The Fall and Rise of Hugh Cornwell (2015)

=== Collaborations ===
- Nosferatu (1979) – Hugh Cornwell and Robert Williams
- CCW (1992) – CCW featuring Hugh Cornwell, Roger Cook and Andy West
- Sons of Shiva (download: 1999, CD: 2002) – Sons of Shiva (Sons of Shiva are Cornwell and poet Sex W. Johnston (actually John W. Sexton))
- This Time It's Personal (2016) – John Cooper Clarke and Hugh Cornwell
