= Invisible Hands Music =

- Founded: 1987
- Founder: Charles Kennedy
- Country of origin: England
- Location: London
- Official website: invisiblehands.co.uk

Invisible Hands Music is a UK-based independent record label.

The label is owned and run by Charles Kennedy who started out by self-releasing cassettes sold at gigs by his first band 'Night World' in 1987. The first CD release was Fretwork Southeast, a compilation album of local bands from Southwest London in 1993. After three more CDs in the series, and an eponymous debut album by Kennedy's alias The Aries Project, the label moved into signing legacy artists starting with Wishbone Ash, and singer-songwriter, Rob Reynolds. Other releases in the 1990s, distributed by Pinnacle in the UK, included electro compilations such as Speed Garage Invasion and Drum n Bass Invasion.

After a gap of five years, the label restarted operations in Camden Town in January 2003, releasing niche cash-in products such as a box set of Emerson, Lake & Palmer remixes by Mike Bennett, a box set of Wishbone Ash demos, and a compilation of covers of David Bowie songs. Hazel O'Connor joined the label with a reissue series of her 1990s albums. Releases included music by guitarist Stevie Salas, Silver Sun (two studio albums), Hugh Cornwell (two studio albums and a live set) and Thomas Dolby (live CD / DVD box set).

In 2008 Invisible Hands signed a partially-reformed lineup of The Jam (sans Paul Weller), and released a new Hugh Cornwell album, Hooverdam, available as a free download.

After a four-year hiatus between 2010 and 2014, the label restarted operations in London's West End, rereleasing The Aries Project's eponymous album under the new title "English Ghosts".

Other artists and releases:

- Miranda Lee Richards – Echoes of the Dreamtime
- Tangerine Dream – Out of this World (Limited edition numbered, double transparent tangerine coloured vinyl)
- Hugh Cornwell – The Fall and Rise of Hugh Cornwell
- Libera – Forever (2023), If (2021), Christmas Carols with Libera (2019), Beyond (2018), Hope (2017), Libera at Christmas (2016)
- Mishka Shubaly – Cowards Path

The above 5 releases were half-speed mastered at Abbey Road studios by Miles Showell.

Releases for 2016 were by Animotion, Crosby & Nash, Superdrone (flexi-disk project), REM, Pearl Jam and James Taylor.

In addition to albums, Invisible Hands released promotional VHS tapes for Rob Reynolds ("Stormy Weather", "Take It Easy", "Sweet Mother"), Clear ("Johnny Marr Was A Mistake"), Hazel O'Connor ("One More Try"), Mick Karn ("The Jump"), and Hugh Cornwell ("Live in London").

== Catalogue ==
Year	Artist	Title	Type	Catalog number
	Night World	Invisible Hands	Album	IH1
	Night World	Atmospheres	Album	IHCD11
	The Aries Project	"Echo Park" / "Ionisphere Blue" / "Up" / "Underpass"		
	Rob Reynolds	"Take It Easy"	Single	IHSCD6
	The Kates		EP	IHCDS17
1988	Night World	The Bears at the End of the Garden	Album	IH2
1990	Night World	Grand Designs	Album	IH3
1993	Night World	Charge of the Night Brigade	Album	IH4
1994	Various	Fretwork Southeast	Compilation	IHCD5
1996	Various	The Crossing: Fretwork Southeast 2	Compilation	IHCD7
1997	Rob Reynolds	Waiting for the Tide	Album	IHCD8
1997	Various	Upshot: Fretwork 3	Compilation	IHCD9
1997	Various	Electronic: Fretwork 4	Compilation	IHCD10
1998	Wishbone Ash	Trance Visionary	Album	IHCD12
1998	Wishbone Ash	"Heritage"	Single	IHST7
1998	Various	Drum 'N' Bass Invasion	Compilation	IHCD14
1999	Various	Speed Garage Invasion	Compilation	IHCD15
2000	Wishbone Ash	Wonderful Stash	Album	IHCD24
2001	Various	Diamond Gods - Interpretations Of Bowie	Compilation	IHCD16
2002	Hazel O'Connor	Beyond the Breaking Glass	Album	IHCD18
2002	Hazel O'Connor	Live in Berlin	Album	IHCD19
2002	Hazel O'Connor	5 in the Morning	Album	IHCD20
2002	Hazel O'Connor	Acoustically Yours	Album	IHCD21
2002	Whysome	Not Even Close To What It Was Meant To Be	Album	IHCD27
2002	Cormac de Barra	Barcó	Album	IHCD32
2003	Emerson, Lake & Palmer	Reworks: Brain Salad Perjury	Album	IHCD23
2003	Clear	Coming Round	Album	IHCD26
2003	Clear	Over and Over	Album	IHCDS15
2003	Clear	"Johnny Marr Was A Mistake"	Single	IHCDS10
2003	UK Subs	Staffordshire Bull	Album	IHCD28
2003	The Vibrators	Live: Near The Seedy Mill Golf Club	Album	IHCD29
2003	Cheap & Nasty	Cool Tak Injection	Album	IHCD30
2003	Hazel O'Connor	A Singular Collection: The Best of Hazel O'Connor	Album	IHCD31
2003	Mick Karn	More Better Different	Album	IHCD33
2003	Forest Giants	"Postcards"	Single	IHS14
2003	Rob Reynolds	"Sweet Mother"	Single	IHCDS11
2004	Forest Giants	In Sequence	Album	IHCD34
2004	Rob Reynolds	In Den Haag (Live)	Album	IHCD36
2004	O.K. Cola	"Everybody Wants to Be a D.J."	Single	IHCDS12
2004	Hazel O'Connor	"One More Try"	Single	IHCDS19
2004	The Kates	"Suicide Valentine"	Single	IHCDS20
2004	Junk TV	"Oh England!"	Single	IHCDS21
2004	Silver Sun	"Bubblegum"	Single	IHCDS23
2004	Hugh Cornwell	"Under Her Spell"	Single	IHCDS28
2005	Rob Reynolds	Samsara Never Sleeps	Album	IHCD17
2005	Rob Reynolds	Sightseeing	Album	IHCD22
2005	Silver Sun	Disappear Here	Album	IHCD35
2005	Hazel O'Connor	Hidden Heart	Album	IHCD37
2005	Hazel O'Connor	"Perfect Days"	Single	IHCDS27
2005	Hugh Cornwell	Beyond Elysian Fields	Album	IHCD38
2006	Ade Payne	My Town	Album	IHCD25
2006	Various	Northern Line: The British at NXNE	Compilation	IHCD40
2006	Rob Reynolds	The Curious World	Album	IHCD41
2006	Rob Reynolds	"Free Me"	Single	IHCDFREEME1
2006	Silver Sun	Dad's Weird Dream	Album	IHCD42
2006	Hugh Cornwell	Dirty Dozen	Album	IHCD43
2006	Hugh Cornwell	People, Places, Pieces	Album	IHCD44
2007	Stevie Salas	The Sun And The Earth "The Essential Stevie Salas" Vol. 1	Album	IHCD39
2007	Various	Lost and Found	Compilation	IHCD45
2007	Various	Invisible Hands Music: Contemporary Formation	Compilation	IHCD50
2007	Birds of Wales	Fall of the 49	Album	IHCD49
2007	The Aries Project	"Shelter" / "Medina" / "Stateless"	Single	IHSCD4
2008	Thomas Dolby	The Sole Inhabitant	Album	IHCD51
2008	Hugh Cornwell	Hooverdam	Album	IHCD52
2008	From The Jam	A First Class Return	DVD boxset	IHCD53
2010	Rob Reynolds	"Heaven Knows"	Single	IHCDS16
2011	Dave Bartram	Lost and Found	Album	IHCD59
2014	The Aries Project	English Ghosts	Album	IHCD6
2015	Mishka Shubaly	Coward's Path	Album	IHCD60
2015	Hugh Cornwell	The Fall And Rise Of Hugh Cornwell	Album	IHCD61
2015	Tangerine Dream	Out of this World	Album	IH65
2016	Animotion	Raise	Album	IHCD62
2016	Miranda Lee Richards	Echoes of the Dreamtime	Album	IHCD63
2016	Rush	Timeless Wavelength	Album	IH66
2016	Crosby & Nash	Wind on the Water	Album	IH67
2016	Dorje	Centred And One	Album	IHCD68
2016	Tangerine Dream	Quantum Key	Album	IH69
2016	Libera	Libera At Christmas	Album	IHCD73
2016	The Jive Aces	For the Record	Album	IH78
2017	Tangerine Dream	Particles	Album	IH72
2017	Miranda Lee Richards	Existential Beast	Album	IH74
2017	Libera	Hope	Album	IH75
2017	Hazel O'Connor	"I'll See You Again" / "Hidden"	Single	IHCDS29
2018	Superdrone	Superdrone One	Album	IH76
2018	Superdrone	Two	Album	IH82
2018	Thorsten Quaeschning	Cargo (original soundtrack)	Album	IH79
2018	Tangerine Dream	"Run to Vegas" / "Leviathan"	EP	IH80T
2018	Tangerine Dream	The Sessions I	Album	IH83
2018	Libera	Beyond	Album	IHCD85
2019	Superdrone	Starcade	Album	IHD89
2019	Libera	Christmas Carols with Libera	Album	IHCD89
2020	Rob Reynolds	"Stormy Weather"	Single	IHSCD5
2021	Libera	If	Album	IHCD90
2023	Libera	Forever	Album	IHCD91
