= Haywoode =

British singer

- Born: Sharon Haywoode
- Origin: London, England
- Genres: Disco, Synth-pop, Boogie, Funk, Soul
- Occupations: Singer, songwriter
- Years active: 1983–present
- Labels: CBS, Fresher Records, Energise Records, Wonderlick Productions

Haywoode (Sidney Haywoode, London) is an English singer and dancer, best known for the 1986 UK top 20 hit single "Roses". She later also recorded under the name Sid Haywoode.

== Career ==
Haywoode trained from an early age at London's Corona Stage Academy.

Her career started with modelling, dancing and acting roles in British television shows like The Gentle Touch and was a regular as a Hill's Angel on The Benny Hill Show.

Among singing, dancing and modelling roles in the West End theatre (Bubbling Brown Sugar), she joined Flick Colby's Zoo, as a professional dancer performing weekly on BBC One's Top of the Pops. She was approached a year later to record a demo by Sony CBS Records offering a deal.

Her debut single, "A Time Like This", reached the Top 5 in the US Hot Dance Club Play Chart, and established her distinctive brand of soulful funk/pop. In July 1986 with the song "Roses" she hit the top 20 in the UK music charts. Her debut album Arrival (released soon after "Roses") included Haywoode's cover version of Prince's "I Wanna Be Your Lover".

In 2011 Haywoode released an album named Bounce Back, collaborating with different producers in Australia, Netherlands, Italy and United States. The album was a mixture of reproduced hits from her 80s career, as well as new tracks. It would later be re-released in 2019 as Bounce Back Deluxe.

In the summer of 2012, she created a music production company "Wonderlick Productions" with her writing partner and music producer Soundsinsane. The song Excuses reached No. 6 on Euro Solution's Independent Hi Energy Dance Chart in UK with the remix of Excuses Produced by Soundsinsane/Haywoode and remix by JRMX in UK.

2018 saw her first single release "Roses 2018" enter charts worldwide including No. 5 Greece, No. 25 on the iTunes Dance Chart. Another Cherry Pop compilation – Roses, Remixes & Rarities was released bringing together many sought-after mixes of her classic 80s singles plus B-sides, rarities and unheard recordings from throughout her CBS tenure.

2019 Haywoode released "Look My Way" a Stock Aiken Waterman song which was originally written for her and later recorded and released on Kylie Minogue's debut album.

== Discography ==
=== Albums ===
Year	Album	Label
1985	Arrival	CBS
2011	Bounce Back	Wonderlick Productions
2018	Roses Remixes & Rarities	Cherry Red

=== Singles ===
Year	Single	Peak chart positions		
Year	Single	US Dance	UK	AUS
1983	"A Time Like This"	5	48	—
1983	"Single Handed"	—	85	—
1984	"I Can't Let You Go"	—	63	—
1985	"Roses"	—	65	—
1985	"Getting Closer"	—	67	—
1986	"You'd Better Not Fool Around"	—	82	—
1986	"Roses" (re-release)	30	11	73
1986	"I Can't Let You Go" (re-recording) (Detroit Mix)	—	50	—
1987	"I'm Your Puppet"	—	98	—
1988	"Boogie Oogie Oogie" (as 'Sid Haywoode')	—	—	—
1989	"He's Got Magic" (as 'Sid Haywoode')	—	—	—
2010	"Getting Closer 2010"	—	—	—
2011	"Kiss Me Good"	—	—	—
2012	"Excuses"	—	—	—
2014	"Sugaboo"	—	—	—
2018	"Roses 2018"	—	—	—
2019	"Look My Way"	—	—	—
"—" denotes releases that did not chart or were not released in that territory.
