= Wired (Hugh Cornwell album) =

Studio album by Hugh Cornwell
- Released: 21 June 1993
- Recorded: 1992
- Studios: Metroplis Studios, London; Soundlab Studios, Wiltshire
- Genre: Alternative rock Post-punk
- Length: 42:51
- Label: Transmission
- Producers: Gary Langan; Hugh Cornwell

Hugh Cornwell chronology
Wolf (1988)	Wired (1993)	Guilty (1997)

Singles from Wired
- 1. "Story of He & She" Released: 1993; 2. "My Kind of Loving" Released: 1994

Alternative cover
- American release

First Bus to Babylon
Review scores
Source	Rating
AllMusic	4/5 stars

Wired is the second solo studio album by Hugh Cornwell, released on 21 June 1993 on the Transmission label. It follows the collaboration album with Robert Williams, Nosferatu (1979), and first proper solo outing, Wolf (1988). It was also his first album after leaving the Stranglers in 1990. Wired was produced by Gary Langan (Art of Noise), with the exception of "Ain't It Strange", which was produced by Cornwell. It was recorded in 1992 at Metropolis Studios in London and Soundlab Studios in Wiltshire. The album's progress was affected by contractual disputes. Cornwell was initially signed to Phoenix Records, but the label started to fall into difficulties and Cornwell cited them for breach of contract. A new deal was struck with NTV (Transmission) to finish the album. Phoenix then maintained that NTV had no right to release the album with arguments over the matter continuing until February 1994. As a result, the album was initially only released in Europe. Two singles were released from the album, "The Story of He & She" in 1993, and "My Kind of Loving" in 1994.

The album was re-released by Griffin Records in 1995 in both CD and cassette formats.

The album was released in the United States on 27 April 1999 on the Velvel Record label, under the title First Bus to Babylon with different artwork and different track listing. The album includes a cover version of Jimi Hendrix's "Stone Free", which according to Cornwell was originally considered for inclusion on the initial release of Wired.

== Track listing ==
All tracks are written by Hugh Cornwell, except where noted.

UK/European release
No.	Title	Length
1.	"Hot Cat on a Tin Roof"	4:08
2.	"Make It with You"	3:32
3.	"My Kind of Loving"	3:25
4.	"Wasted Tears"	4:11
5.	"Story of He & She"	4:56
6.	"Ain't It Strange"	3:10
7.	"Stop"	4:19
8.	"Mr Insignificant"	3:39
9.	"Turn Your Body Down"	3:34
10.	"Love in Your Eyes"	3:58
11.	"First Bus to Babylon"	3:59

The American edition retitled First Bus to Babylon dropped the track "Make It With You" and includes "Stone Free" and "My Kind of Loving" (12" version).

First Bus to Babylon – US release
No.	Title	Writer(s)	Length
1.	"Hot Cat on a Tin Roof"		4:08
2.	"My Kind of Loving"		3:26
3.	"Wasted Tears"		4:11
4.	"Story of He & She"		4:57
5.	"Ain't It Strange"		3:10
6.	"Stop"		4:19
7.	"Mr Insignificant"		3:38
8.	"Turn Your Body Down"		3:33
9.	"Love in Your Eyes"		3:58
10.	"First Bus to Babylon"		3:58
11.	"Stone Free"	Jimi Hendrix	3:39
12.	"My Kind of Loving" (12" mix)		7:32

== Personnel ==
Credits adapted from the album liner notes.

Musicians

- Hugh Cornwell – guitar, vocals
- Chris Goulstone – guitar
- Ted Mason – guitar
- Tomoyasu Hotei – guitar (on "Ain't It Strange")
- Alex Gifford – bass guitar
- Phil Andrews – keyboards
- George De Angelis – Hammond organ
- Robert Williams – drums, percussion
- Steve Ferrera – additional drum programming
- Wesley Magoogan – brass
- Joel Squires – harmonica

Technical

- Gary Langan – producer (except "Ain't It Strange"), photography
- Hugh Cornwell – producer ("Ain't It Strange")
- James Cadsky – engineer
- Jamie Cullum – assistant engineer
- John Pasche – artwork, design
- David Mach – artwork (hanger head)
- David Scheinmann – photography

== Release history ==
Region	Date	Label	Format	Catalogue
Europe	21 June 1993	Transmission Records	CD	TRANS CD 1
United Kingdom	6 June 1995	Griffin Records	CD/CS	131
United States	27 April 1999	Velvel Record	CD	63467-79767-2
