= Hi Fi (album) =

- UK release cover

Studio album by Hugh Cornwell
- Released: 2 October 2000
- Recorded: 1999–2000
- Studio: Helicon Mountain Recording Studios, London; Soundlab Studios, Loughton
- Genre: Alternative rock Post-punk
- Length: 41:44 (UK); 55:01(US/Europe)
- Label: Koch Entertainment
- Producer: Laurie Latham

Hugh Cornwell chronology
Solo (1999)	Hi Fi (2000)	Footprints in the Desert (2002)

Alternative cover
- US/European release, 2001

Alternative cover
- 2021 vinyl reissue

Hi Fi is the fourth studio album by Hugh Cornwell, released on 2 October 2000 by Koch Entertainment.

It is produced by Laurie Latham, who also worked on Cornwell's previous album Guilty (1997). All instrumentation is by Cornwell with appearances from Justin Chapman (drums), Michelle Marti (bass) and Mike Polson (guitar) from his touring band, a string quartet, and harmonica player John Dominic (ex-the Bo Street Runners, Deborah Bonham Band).

In 2001, the album was released in the US (Koch) and Europe (Edel) under the same title but with different artwork, an additional version of "Gingerbread Girl" and two live tracks.

A remixed and remastered vinyl edition of Hi Fi was released by Cornwell's own HIS Records in 2021. It was released in a limited edition of 500 copies, with new cover art work, and with the original track listing.

== Critical reception ==
Professional ratings
Review scores
Source	Rating
AllMusic	4/5 stars

AllMusic's Mark Deming found the album "pleasingly tuneful, with strong pop melodies," and a "winning psychedelic undertow" on certain tracks. He felt it "ranks with the most confident and accessible work of [Cornwell's] career," with Cornwell's vocals and songwriting being "in fine shape", and Laurie Latham's production serving the material well.

== Track listing ==
All tracks are written by Hugh Cornwell

No.	Title	Length
1.	"Leave Me Alone"	3:27
2.	"One Day at a Time"	4:56
3.	"All the Colours of the Rainbow"	4:29
4.	"Putting You in the Shade"	2:42
5.	"The Big Sleep"	4:50
6.	"Miss Teazyweezy"	3:57
7.	"Dark Side of the Room"	3:42
8.	"Lay Back On Me Pal"	3:35
9.	"Gingerbread Girl"	4:16
10.	"The Prison's Going Down"	6:08
Total length:		41:44

== US/European 2001 release ==
Duration of some tracks differ from the UK version.

All tracks are written by Hugh Cornwell, except where noted

No.	Title	Writer(s)	Length
1.	"Leave Me Alone"		3:27
2.	"Gingerbread Girl" (bitten by the Dog)		4:36
3.	"One Day at a Time"		5:11
4.	"All the Colours of the Rainbow"		4:38
5.	"Putting You in the Shade"		2:42
6.	"The Big Sleep"		5:06
7.	"Miss Teazyweezy"		4:12
8.	"Dark Side of the Room"		3:47
9.	"Lay Back On Me Pal"		3:35
10.	"Gingerbread Girl" (original album version)		4:18
11.	"The Prison's Going Down"		6:06
12.	"Golden Brown" (live)	Cornwell, Jean-Jacques Burnel, Dave Greenfield, Jet Black	3:09
13.	"Always the Sun" (live)	Cornwell, Burnel, Greenfield, Black	4:14
Total length:			55:01

- Track 2: additional production and mixing by the Black Dog at Black Dog Towers, London.
- Tracks 11 and 12: solo acoustic live recordings; no date or location is given.

== Personnel ==
Credits adapted from the album liner notes.

Musicians

- Hugh Cornwell – vocals, instrumentation
- Justin Chapman – drums (1, 3–8)
- Michelle Marti – bass (1, 4–8)
- Mike Polson – additional guitar (1, 5, 7, 8)
- Sumyungstrings:

Gita Langley – violin
Jesse Murphy – violin
Rachel Helleur – cello
Una Palliser – viola (8, 9)

- John Dominic – harmonica "Dark Side of the Room" & "The Prison's Going Down"

Technical

- Laurie Latham – producer, engineer
- Jon Astley – mastering
- AL at Spot On Design – design, artwork
- Gary Bryan – cover photography

2001 US/European release

- Steve "Hotdog" Ash – engineer (2)
- Jeff Chenault – art direction, design

2021 vinyl reissue

- Hugh Cornwell – remixing, artwork
- Phil Andrews – remixing
- Barry Grint – remastering
- Nick Stone – artwork
- Andrew J. Davies – photography
