= Hooverdam (album) =

Studio album by Hugh Cornwell
- Released: June 2008
- Studio: Toe Rag Studios, London
- Genre: Alternative rock; post-punk
- Length: 39:01
- Label: Invisible Hands Music
- Producer: Liam Watson

Hugh Cornwell chronology
Beyond Elysian Fields (2004)	Hooverdam (2008)	Totem and Taboo (2012)

Hooverdam is the seventh studio album by Hugh Cornwell, released in June 2008 by Invisible Hands Music, initially as a free digital download with a compact disc and vinyl version released later. A short movie entitled "Blueprint" chronicling the recording of the album had a limited release in cinemas in the UK and was released on a DVD which came with the CD. Some tracks, like "Philip K. Ridiculous" and "Delightful Nightmare," echo the heavy bass lines previously present in early Stranglers records.

The night after playing in Phoenix in his North America tour during March and August, Cornwell visited the Hoover Dam and recorded a video message there for his fans. He claims he gave the album its name because the Hoover Dam is a huge feat in human engineering and a monument to mankind. He thinks that Alfred Hitchcock should have made a film set at the Hoover Dam.

The album was cited as being one of his best yet with mainly favourable reviews. These reviews resulted in Cornwell being asked to play at certain American venues he had not played in since leaving The Stranglers.

== Critical reception ==
Professional ratings
Review scores
Source	Rating
AllMusic	3.5/5 stars
Record Collector	4/5 stars

Rick Anderson, writing for AllMusic, called it a "very fine album," consisting of "scrappy, pared-down, punk-inflected power pop," with some songs evoking "the late '70s in an entirely salutary way." Michael Toland of The Big Takeover concurred, describing the album as "a straightforward melodic rock and roll affair," adding that there's "nothing trendy or modern about it, thank goodness." Cornwell and his band "simply knock out one catchy rock/pop gem after another." Toland felt that Hooverdam "contains some of the best work of Cornwell's long and illustrious career."

Joe Shooman of Record Collector wrote, "the pace rarely lets up on an LP that, in part due to its back-to-basics rock'n'roll aesthetic, makes it something of a cousin to the likes of Lou Reed's storming 1988 LP, New York." Shooman remarked: "a very coherent album with rather a timeless quality." Jason Toon of the Riverfront Times wrote, "Hooverdam's stripped-down, three-chord sound is rawer than anything Cornwell's done since well before he left the Stranglers in 1990."

== Track listing ==
All tracks are written by Hugh Cornwell

No.	Title	Length
1.	"Please Don't Put Me on a Slowboat to Trowbridge"	3:16
2.	"Going to the City"	3:32
3.	"Delightful Nightmare"	4:41
4.	"Within Or Without You"	5:17
5.	"Rain On the River"	3:43
6.	"Beat of My Heart"	3:41
7.	"Philip K. Ridiculous"	3:29
8.	"The Pleasure of Your Company"	4:02
9.	"Wrong Side of the Tracks"	3:38
10.	"Banging on the Same Old Beat"	3:48

== Blueprint DVD ==
No.	Title	Length
1.	"Wrong Side of the Tracks"
2.	"Going to the City"
3.	"Delightful Nightmare"
4.	"Within Or Without You"
5.	"Rain On the River"
6.	"Beat of My Heart"
7.	"Philip K. Ridiculous"
8.	"The Pleasure of Your Company"
9.	"Please Don't Put Me on a Slowboat to Trowbridge"
10.	"Banging on the Same Old Beat"
11.	"Hugh Cornwell Interview"
Total length:		81:00

== Personnel ==
Credits adapted from the album liner notes.

Musicians

- Hugh Cornwell - vocals, guitar
- Chris Bell - drums, synthesizer (8)
- Caroline 'Caz' Campbell - bass, vocals, piano (6, 9), synthesizer (8)

Additional musicians

- Charles Kennedy - piano (9)
- Damian Hand - saxophone (10)

Technical

- Liam Watson - producer, engineer, mixing
- Ed Turner - engineer, mixing
- John Clube - artwork
- Phoenix - photography

DVD

- Hugh Cornwell - director, editing, post production
- Matt Tidmarsh - editing, post production
- Paul Barker - editing, post production
- Liam Watson - engineer, sound mixing
- Ed Turner - engineer, sound mixing
- Tom Grimshaw - camera
- Chris Reynolds - camera
- Jamie Goodbrand - camera
- Marc Rovira - camera
- Paul Green - film producer
