= Danny Kadar =

- Born: August 15, 1969 (age 56)
- Genres: Pop rock
- Occupations: Record producer; audio engineer; mixer
- Years active: 1971–present

Danny Kadar (born August 15, 1969) is an American record producer, audio engineer, and mixer, living in New Orleans. While growing up in New York City, Kadar first began as a student photographer studying at Pratt Institute, he later decided to go into the music industry with his own band at the time. After being in the studio, Kadar would soon learn more about how to run the studio. With all the experience he has from producing, editing, and mixing, Kadar has been able to work with popular acts such as Band of Horses, My Morning Jacket, and Iggy Pop.

== Selected discography ==
- 2011 - Fixin' to Die - G.Love
- 2010 - Infinite Arms - Band of Horses
- 2009 - Songs in the Night - Samantha Crain
- 2008 - Didn't It Feel Kinder - Amy Ray
- 2007 - What's the Time Mr Wolf? - Noisettes
- 2007 - Friend - Grizzly Bear
- 2007 - Emotionalism - The Avett Brothers
- 2003 - It Still Moves - My Morning Jacket
- 1996 - Sex, America, Cheap Trick - Cheap Trick
- 1996 - Don Solaris - 808 State
