= Robert Williams (drummer) =

American drummer

Robert Arthur Williams
- Also known as: Wait For Me
- Born: 1955 (age 70–71); Boston, Massachusetts, U.S.

Robert Williams (born 1955 in Boston) is a drummer and solo artist who has worked with Captain Beefheart, Hugh Cornwell, John Lydon, the Spo-it's, Tex and the Horseheads, Elvira, Mistress of the Dark, and Zoogz Rift, and also performed on recordings for the Pee-wee Herman Show original cast recording.

His albums include:

- Captain Beefheart and the Magic Band:
  - Shiny Beast (Bat Chain Puller)
  - Doc At The Radar Station
- Hugh Cornwell and Robert Williams:
  - Nosferatu
- Robert Williams:
  - Buy My Record
  - Late One Night
  - Date With The Devil's Daughter - The first song, "Hello Robert", consists of messages that Larry "Wild Man" Fischer left on Robert Williams phone
  - Temporary Immortal (as Beefheart Jr.)
- The Spo-it's
  - Free Sex (AVT00)
- Zoogz Rift
  - Five Billion Pinheads Can't Be Wrong (AVT001)

== Television ==
In 1997, Robert Williams filed a lawsuit against former Sex Pistols lead singer John Lydon (aka Johnny Rotten) for assault and lost wages that was broadcast as an installment on Judge Judy; Williams lost the case due to a lack of evidence.
