= Nosferatu (Hugh Cornwell and Robert Williams album) =

Studio album by Hugh Cornwell and Robert Williams
- Released: 16 November 1979
- Recorded: December 1978–April 1979
- Studio: Village Recorder (Los Angeles, California); Cherokee (Hollywood, California); Britannia Studios; Davlen (Los Angeles, California); Sunset Sound (Hollywood, California); Eden, London, UK
- Genre: Post-punk; goth rock; new wave
- Length: 34:59
- Label: United Artists
- Producer: Hugh Cornwell, Robert Williams

Hugh Cornwell chronology
Nosferatu (1979)	Wolf (1988)

Robert Williams chronology
Nosferatu (1979)	Late One Night (1982)

Singles from Nosferatu
- 1. "White Room" Released: 25 October 1979

Nosferatu is an album by Hugh Cornwell of the Stranglers and Robert Williams, drummer in Captain Beefheart and the Magic Band. It was released on 16 November 1979 by United Artists.

The album cover features a still from F. W. Murnau's 1922 film of the same name, with the album styled as a soundtrack to the film. Guest musicians on the album include keyboardist Ian Underwood from Frank Zappa's band and guitarist David Walldroop. Mark and Bob Mothersbaugh of the band Devo play on the song "Rhythmic Itch", and "Wrong Way Round" features Ian Dury as a fairground barker (listed as "Duncan Poundcake" on the album credits).

Hugh Cornwell was advised to start a solo career in case of the Stranglers breaking up due to the end of the punk-rock scene. A cover version of Cream's "White Room" was the only single to be released from the album, backed with an instrumental version of "Losers in a Lost Land", which failed to chart; however, "Wired" was included on the Stranglers' "Don't Bring Harry" EP, which reached No. 41 in the UK Singles Chart.

== Background ==
The one-off album collaboration between guitarist and vocalist Hugh Cornwell of the Stranglers and Captain Beefheart drummer Robert Williams began when Cornwell, after a North American Stranglers tour, attended three consecutive Beefheart shows in San Francisco in April 1978. Cornwell and Williams befriended each other after the shows and decided to keep in touch. Later the same year, when Cornwell had a break in his Stranglers schedule, he contacted Williams just before Christmas 1978 and invited him to record an album. "As far as the motivation to make the record goes, Nosferatu was pure whimsy," Cornwell said in 2014. "I mean [Stranglers bassist Jean-Jacques] Burnel had just recorded Euroman, so I thought, why not have a go?" As the 1922 film Nosferatu had been a silent movie originally, Cornwell decided that "a good starting place would be to try to approximate a soundtrack for it," visualizing it as "an amazing vehicle for emotional music".

Robert Williams was told that it would just be the two of them recording without a band, and that the songs would be written in the studio. Williams then booked some of the best recording studios in Los Angeles and invited his friend Joe Chiccarelli along as their recording engineer. Cornwell flew out to Los Angeles to begin the recording sessions just after Christmas 1978. With such short notice, they had to move around from studio to studio every few days, which made the recording process longer than necessary. Recording from late December into January 1979, they continued the sessions in March and April after a two month break due to Cornwell's touring commitments with the Stranglers. In 2014, Williams said of the writing and recording procedure: "Hugh and I made the songs up in the studio usually starting with the drum track ... Hugh did not have a demo before starting Nosferatu but he had a few little riffs on guitar for just a few songs that we both fleshed out. Then we would bring home cassettes from the sessions to study and come up with subsequent parts. We spent daylight hours sleeping and worked throughout the night, very much like vampires."

Various guests from the Los Angeles area were invited in to play: woodwind and keyboard player Ian Underwood from Frank Zappa's the Mothers of Invention, Devo's Mark and Bob Mothersbaugh, and Williams' guitarist friend David Walldroop. Cornwell and Williams also rented various instruments and experimented with them. "There was one night where the entire studio was filled with percussion instruments like tympanies, tubular bells, tamatoms, gongs, bongos, congas, and timbales," Williams said. "Hugh suggested we do "White Room" and the arrangement was my idea." According to Cornwell, the title track was supposed to be an instrumental, but in his absence, Williams wrote the lyrics and recorded most of the track by himself.

In April the Nosferatu sessions shifted from Los Angeles to London's Eden Studios. The track "Mothra" was recorded with engineer Alan Winstanley and the album was then mixed at AIR Studios by Winstanley and Steve Churchyard. The whole album took 22 days to record. While mixing the album, Ian Dury recorded vocals for the track "Wrong Way Round," and the Clash, who were also mixing at AIR, were invited to add backing vocals to "Puppets." According to Cornwell, though, only guitarist Mick Jones was around when they actually recorded the vocals.

Cornwell has stated that Nosferatu was an "extremely expensive" album to make, and that it has never made any money. His record label United Artists was unaware that he was recording the album, until they started getting invoices sent to them from the recording studios. However, they paid them all. The album sold poorly upon release and failed to make any impact on the album charts.

An additional track, "Grinding the Gears", recorded at the same sessions, was released on Robert Williams' first solo album Late One Night in 1982.

The album is dedicated to the memory of actor Max Schreck, who played the lead role as the vampire Count Orlok in the 1922 film. The inner sleeve features song lyrics on one side and a lifesize Japanese hannya mask (by K. Kaneko) on the other.

== Songs and themes ==
In a 1979 interview with NME, Cornwell said that all the songs on side one of the album are "portions or episodes" of an imaginary film about Nosferatu. The title track describes the hunted vampire as he is being chased through the streets as dawn approaches. In "Losers in a Lost Land", he's back in his crypt, "pondering his miserable existence." In a 2014 interview with the Strangled website, however, Cornwell said that "Losers in a Lost Land" is about struggling actors. Though not written by Cornwell and Williams, "White Room" recalls the vampire's past, "and how he got into this state in the first place," Cornwell said in 1979. In "Irate Caterpillar," the vampire is confronted by technology: "this immortal ghoul in this industrial complex where he sees a crane and thinks that it's a giant caterpillar out to destroy him." Cornwell also said in 2014 that "Irate Caterpillar" is about musician Fred Frith of English experimental rock band Henry Cow. Side one ends with "Rhythmic Itch," which is described in the album's liner notes as "a moving tribute to Dracula."

The album's second side consists mostly of "studies in aspects of perversity," Cornwell stated. "It fascinates me. Perversity is a part of everyone, because all humans are imperfect and those imperfections create perversities." The first track, "Wired," is a "jagged set of observations on a state of paranoia," or as Cornwell said in 2014: "about being on cocaine." "Big Bug" is about the personal armoured train of Leon Trotsky, and "Wrong Way Round" is about a girl built upside down: "A macabre and grotesque portrait of a circus freak," as stated in the album's liner notes. The instrumental "Mothra" sounded like "the machinations of a giant moth," so Cornwell and Williams named it after the Japanese fictional monster of the same name. The album's final track, "Puppets", is about "record company manipulation of artists," Cornwell said in 2014.

Since the 1990s, songs like "Losers in a Lost Land", "White Room", "Irate Caterpillar", "Wired", "Big Bug" and "Mothra" have turned up in Cornwell's solo live set from time to time.

== Critical reception ==
Professional ratings
Review scores
Source	Rating
The Great Rock Discography	2/10

Ira Robbins of Trouser Press praised the album's lyrics, but disliked its "atonal performances." He felt that "if not for an incongruous cover of Cream's "White Room," there wouldn't be any light relief at all." He concluded that the album "requires more from the listener than it deserves (or returns)." Robert Endeacott, on the other hand, in his 2014 book Peaches: A Chronicle of The Stranglers 1974-1990, called the album "pretty bloody hot and startlingly original."

== Track listing ==
All lyrics are written by Hugh Cornwell; all music is composed by Hugh Cornwell and Robert Williams, except where noted.

Side one
No.	Title	Lyrics	Music	Length
1.	"Nosferatu"	Williams		1:43
2.	"Losers in a Lost Land"			4:26
3.	"White Room"	Pete Brown	Jack Bruce	3:53
4.	"Irate Caterpillar"			5:00
5.	"Rhythmic Itch"	Mark Mothersbaugh		2:12

Side two
No.	Title	Lyrics	Music	Length
6.	"Wired"			3:07
7.	"Big Bug"			3:50
8.	"Mothra"	instrumental		2:57
9.	"Wrong Way Round"		Cornwell	4:58
10.	"Puppets"		Cornwell	2:48

1998 CD reissue bonus track
No.	Title	Length
11.	"Losers in a Lost Land" (instrumental version)	4:26

== Personnel ==
Credits adapted from the album's liner notes.

All arrangements by Hugh Cornwell and Robert Williams

"Nosferatu"

- Hugh Cornwell - guitar, slide guitar
- Robert Williams - lead vocals, drums, Tama toms, guitar, bass, whistle
- Ian Underwood - Yamaha synthesizer

"Losers in a Lost Land"

- Hugh Cornwell - lead vocals, guitar, bass
- Robert Williams - drums, Moog synthesizer, backing vocals

"White Room"

- Hugh Cornwell - lead vocals, lead guitar, bass, Moog bass, Chamberlin Mellotron
- Robert Williams - drums, timpani, backing vocals
- David Walldroop - rhythm guitar
- Ian Underwood - Sonar Yamaha synthesizer

"Irate Caterpillar"

- Hugh Cornwell - lead vocals, guitar
- Robert Williams - drums, percussion, waterphone, Moog bass
- David Walldroop - guitar solo
- Ian Underwood - Yamaha synthesizer (intro)

"Rhythmic Itch"

- Hugh Cornwell - guitar
- Robert Williams - drums, Syndrums, bass, bass marimbas, parade drum
- Mark Mothersbaugh - lead vocals, Prophet synthesizer
- Bob Mothersbaugh - guitar, backing vocals

"Wired"

- Hugh Cornwell - lead vocals, guitar
- Robert Williams - drums, rototoms, bass, percussion, cuícas, whistle, backing vocals
- Ian Underwood - soprano saxophone (intro), Moog synthesizer solo

"Big Bug"

- Hugh Cornwell - lead vocals, guitar
- Robert Williams - drums, rototoms, bass, tack piano, percussion
- A. N. Russian - intro voice

"Mothra"

- Hugh Cornwell - bass, chant vocals
- Robert Williams - drums, tubular bells, chant vocals

"Wrong Way Round"

- Hugh Cornwell - lead vocals, backwards and forwards guitar, bass, calliope
- Robert Williams - drums, Syndrums
- Ian Dury (credited as "Duncan Poundcake") - fairground barker
- Various people - crowd

"Puppets"

- Hugh Cornwell - lead vocals, guitar, Prophet synthesizer
- Robert Williams - drums, bass, Moog bass, backing vocals
- The Clash (credited as "various people") - puppet chant

Technical personnel

- Hugh Cornwell – producer, cover concept
- Robert Williams – producer
- Joe Chiccarelli – engineer (except "Mothra")
- Alan Winstanley – engineer ("Mothra"), mixing
- Steve Churchyard – mixing
- George Peckham – mastering
- F.W. Murnau – front cover
- Rocking Russian – cover design
- Ben J. Adams – photography
