= Guilty (Hugh Cornwell album) =

Studio album by Hugh Cornwell
- Released: 27 May 1997
- Recorded: 1996
- Studio: The Workhouse Studios, London; Helicon Mountain Recording Studios, Blackheath; Soundlab Studios, Loughton, Essex
- Genre: Alternative rock; post-punk
- Length: 49:51 (UK); 55:12(US)
- Label: Madfish
- Producer: Laurie Latham

Hugh Cornwell chronology
Wired (1993)	Guilty (1997)	Mayday (1999)

Black Hair, Black Eyes, Black Suit
- U.S. release, Velvel 1999

Guilty is the third solo studio album by Hugh Cornwell, released in 1997 on the Madfish label.

The album was released in the US on 23 February 1999 on Velvel Records as Black Hair, Black Eyes, Black Suit with different artwork and two additional tracks: "Jesus Will Weep" and "Not Hungry Enough," and without "Five Miles High".

== Critical reception ==
Professional ratings
Review scores
Source	Rating
AllMusic	3/5 stars

AllMusic's Jack Rabid wrote that the album is "focused, well-conceived, and finely written as the Stranglers' better post-Black and White LPs." He added that Cornwell "has proven himself a minor master of mannered pop with purpose before, and he's done it again here."

== Track listing ==
All tracks are written by Hugh Cornwell

No.	Title	Length
1.	"One Burning Desire"	4:40
2.	"Snapper"	5:58
3.	"Nerves of Steel"	4:21
4.	"Black Hair Black Eyes Black Suit"	4:35
5.	"Hot Head"	4:39
6.	"Endless Day Endless Night"	4:19
7.	"Five Miles High" (not included on US issue)	4:01
8.	"Sravandrabellagola"	1:18
9.	"Long Dead Train"	5:10
10.	"Torture Garden"	5:00
11.	"House of Sorrow"	5:50
Total length:		49:51

Black Hair, Black Eyes, Black Suit
No.	Title	Length
1.	"One Burning Desire"	4:40
2.	"Snapper"	5:58
3.	"Nerves of Steel"	4:21
4.	"Jesus Will Weep" (US issue bonus track)	4:12
5.	"Black Hair Black Eyes Black Suit"	4:35
6.	"Hot Head"	4:39
7.	"Endless Day Endless Night"	4:19
8.	"Not Hungry Enough" (US issue bonus track)	4:05
9.	"Sravandrabellagola"	1:18
10.	"Long Dead Train"	5:10
11.	"Torture Garden"	5:00
12.	"House of Sorrow"	5:50
Total length:		55:12

== Personnel ==
- Hugh Cornwell - vocals, guitar, banjo
- Steve Lawrence - bass, backing vocals
- Phil Andrews - keyboards, backing vocals
- Chris Bell - drums, percussion
- Laurie Latham - additional percussion

Technical

- Laurie Latham - producer, engineer
- Ray Mascarenas - assistant engineer
- Crispin Murray - mastering
- Tim Young - mastering
- Al at Spot On Design - art design
- Tim Kent - photography
