= Live (X Cert) =

Live album by the Stranglers
- Released: 23 February 1979
- Recorded: June 1977 – September 1978
- Venues: The Roundhouse and Battersea Park, London
- Genre: Post-punk
- Length: 42:39 (Original vinyl)
- Label: United Artists
- Producer: Martin Rushent

The Stranglers live albums chronology
n.a.	Live (X Cert) (1979)	All Live and All of the Night (1988)

Live (X Cert) is the first live album by the Stranglers, released in February 1979 by United Artists. It contains tracks recorded at The Roundhouse in June and November 1977 and at Battersea Park in September 1978.

It captures the raw punk sound of the band prior to the more experimental music of their fourth album, 1979's The Raven. It also contains some amusing between-song audience baiting and provides a fairly accurate picture of the Stranglers' live sound during this period.

CD reissues were augmented with extra live tracks recorded at The Nashville, West Kensington in 1976, and The Hope and Anchor, Islington in 1977.

The album spent ten weeks on the UK Albums Chart, peaking at No. 7. It was the band's fourth album release, and their fourth consecutive UK top ten album.

== Critical reception ==
Professional ratings
Review scores
Source	Rating
AllMusic	3/5 stars
Encyclopedia of Popular Music	2/5 stars
The Great Rock Discography	5/10
NME	5/5 stars
Record Collector	3/5 stars
Smash Hits	4/10
Sounds	4/5 stars

The album received a mixed reception at the time of release. Nick Kent of the NME remarked that those who have the band's first three studio albums "don't need inferior versions of the same," while Ronnie Gurr, reviewing the album for the same magazine, said, "Played alongside the studio tracks, the quality, power and gut ... shines through and leaves Rattus Norvegicus, No More Heroes and Black and White as mere cut-outs in the deletion bin of life."

Retrospectively, Ira Robbins of Trouser Press wrote that the "high-tension ambience" and Hugh Cornwell's audience banter "make it an effective dual-function live/greatest hits album." John Dougan, writing for AllMusic, wrote, "Live (X Cert) is worthy if only to hear Hugh Cornwell bait and insult the audience (very punk!). Plus the band sounds pretty good, loads of aggression and volume add to the fun. Not essential but a very interesting snapshot of an era."

== Track listing ==
All tracks are written by the Stranglers.

No.	Title	Recording date and location	Length
1.	"(Get a) Grip (on Yourself)"	The Roundhouse, London, 5 November 1977	3:46
2.	"Dagenham Dave"	The Roundhouse, 5 November 1977	3:12
3.	"Burning Up Time"	The Roundhouse, 5 November 1977	2:35
4.	"Dead Ringer"	The Roundhouse, 6 November 1977	3:24
5.	"Hanging Around"	The Roundhouse, 26 June 1977	4:09
6.	"I Feel Like a Wog"	The Roundhouse, 5 November 1977	3:27
7.	"Straighten Out"	The Roundhouse, 5 November 1977	2:50
8.	"Curfew"	Battersea Park, London, 16 September 1978	3:50
9.	"Do You Wanna"/"Death and Night and Blood (Yukio)"	Battersea Park, 16 September 1978	5:35
10.	"5 Minutes"	The Roundhouse, 5 November 1977	4:12
11.	"Go Buddy Go"	Battersea Park, 16 September 1978	5:39
Total length:			42:39

2001 CD reissue bonus tracks (EMI)
No.	Title	Length
12.	"Peasant in the Big Shitty"	3:38
13.	"In the Shadows"	4:26
14.	"Sometimes"	4:46
15.	"Mean to Me"	3:24
16.	"London Lady"	2:19
17.	"Goodbye Toulouse"	3:09
18.	"Hanging Around" (different version)	4:02
Total length:		69:26

- Track 12 from The Nashville, London, 10 December 1976. Originally included on a free 7" with the Rattus Norvegicus album.
- Track 13 from Hope and Anchor, London, 22 November 1977. Originally included on the "Don't Bring Harry" EP in 1979.
- Tracks 14–18 are taken from the same era as the original source tapes.

2018 CD reissue bonus tracks (Parlophone)

(Associated Recordings)
No.	Title	Length
12.	"Down In The Sewer"	7:21
13.	"Something Better Change"	3:31
14.	"Bring on the Nubiles"	2:48
15.	"Bitching"	4:09
16.	"Peaches"	3:37
17.	"Nice 'n' Sleazy"	5:17
18.	"Ugly"	4:13
19.	"London Lady"	2:28
Total length:		78:29

- Tracks 12–19 are from the shows used for Live (X-Cert) and are previously unreleased.

== Personnel ==
Credits adapted from the album liner notes.

The Stranglers

- Hugh Cornwell – guitar, vocals
- Jean-Jacques Burnel – bass, vocals
- Dave Greenfield – keyboards, vocals
- Jet Black – drums

Technical

- Martin Rushent – producer, mixing
- Alan Winstanley – engineer
- Doug Bennett – engineer
- Laurence Diana – engineer
- Mick McKenna – engineer
- George Peckham – mastering
- John Pasche – art direction, design
- Kevin Sparrow – logo
- Terry Kemble – model making
- Phil Jude – outer sleeve photography
- Trevor Rogers – inner sleeve photography
- Hiro Ohno – inner sleeve photography
