= Live at the Hope and Anchor =

Live album by the Stranglers
- Released: 9 March 1992
- Recorded: 22 November 1977
- Venue: Hope and Anchor, Islington
- Genre: Rock
- Length: 77:43
- Label: EMI
- Producer: Jean Jacques Burnel

The Stranglers live albums chronology
All Live and All of the Night (1988)	Live at the Hope and Anchor (1992)	Saturday Night, Sunday Morning (1993)

Professional ratings
Review scores
Source	Rating
AllMusic	2.5/5 stars

Live at the Hope and Anchor is a live album by the Stranglers, released on 9 March 1992 by EMI. It consists of an entire set from a concert at the Hope and Anchor pub in Islington, North London, recorded on 22 November 1977.

== Background ==
This particular concert took place on the opening night of the "Front Row Festival", a series of shows by regulars of the venue during 1977. The album was originally only available as a bootleg recording. The song "Tits" featured on the white EP that was given away free with the first 75,000 copies of the band's Black and White album in 1978. "Hanging Around" and "Straighten Out" were included on the "Front Row Festival" album, released in 1978. "In the Shadows" was previously released on the "Don't Bring Harry" EP in 1979. Many of the songs in the band's set that night were played by request; for this show, they rehearsed their entire catalogue. It is regarded as one of the band's more memorable shows. In 1992, the whole concert received an official release, produced by Stranglers bassist/vocalist Jean Jacques Burnel.

== Track listing ==
All tracks are written by the Stranglers, except where noted.

No.	Title	Writer(s)	Length
1.	"Tits"		5:38
2.	"Choosey Susie"		3:01
3.	"Goodbye Toulouse"		3:23
4.	"Bitching"		4:15
5.	"Mean to Me"		2:29
6.	"School Mam"		5:53
7.	"Peasant in the Big Shitty"		3:33
8.	"In the Shadows"		4:31
9.	"Walk On By"	Burt Bacharach, Hal David	5:36
10.	"Princess of the Streets"		4:52
11.	"Go Buddy Go"		7:07
12.	"No More Heroes"		3:37
13.	"Straighten Out"		2:55
14.	"Peaches"		3:42
15.	"Hanging Around"		4:11
16.	"Dagenham Dave"		3:15
17.	"Sometimes"		4:56
18.	"Bring on the Nubiles"		2:27
19.	"London Lady"		2:22
Total length:			77:43

== Personnel ==
Credits adapted from the album's liner notes, except where noted.

The Stranglers

- Hugh Cornwell – guitar, vocals
- Jean-Jacques Burnel – bass, vocals
- Dave Greenfield – keyboards, vocals
- Jet Black – drums

Technical

- Jean-Jacques Burnel – producer
- Gareth Cousins – mix engineer
- Tim Summerhayes – engineer (Rak Records Mobile)
- Assorted Images – sleeve
- Chris Gabrin – photography
- Trevor Rogers – photography
- Nik Yeoman – liner notes
