= The Stranglers and Friends – Live in Concert =

The Stranglers and Friends: Live in Concert

Live album by the Stranglers
- Released: 21 February 1995
- Recorded: 4 April 1980
- Venues: Rainbow Theatre, London
- Length: 70:00
- Labels: Receiver (1995); Castle Music (2002)

The Stranglers live albums chronology
Death and Night and Blood (1994)	The Stranglers and Friends: Live in Concert (1995)	Live in London (1997)

Alternative cover
- 2002 reissue

Professional ratings
Review scores
Source	Rating
AllMusic	3/5 stars

The Stranglers and Friends: Live in Concert is a live album by English rock band the Stranglers, released in 1995 by Receiver Records. In 2002, the album was re-released on the Castle Music label, digitally remastered from the original master tapes with new artwork and sleeve notes.

== Background ==
In early 1980, guitarist and singer Hugh Cornwell was in Pentonville Prison for drugs possession. With two gigs scheduled at the London Rainbow for 3 April and 4 April, the management decided to turn things around by approaching artists including Robert Fripp, John Ellis, Toyah Willcox, Peter Hammill and Hazel O'Connor, to fill in for the absent Cornwell. The Stranglers and Friends: Live in Concert chronicles this event. At the time, it was planned to release a live album of the concerts, with all the proceeds going to the drug rehabilitation organisation Cure. The album never materialised as the band nearly went bankrupt shortly after the concerts, and it was forgotten about.

== Track listing ==
All tracks are written by the Stranglers.

No.	Title	Length
1.	"Introduction" (by Jet Black)	1:53
2.	"Get A Grip" (with Hazel O'Connor and Robert Smith)	3:42
3.	"Hanging Around" (with Hazel O'Connor and Robert Smith)	4:09
4.	"Tank" (with Peter Hammill and Robert Fripp)	3:03
5.	"Threatened" (with Robert Fripp)	3:21
6.	"Toiler On the Sea" (with Phil Daniels and Robert Fripp)	5:19
7.	"The Raven" (with Peter Hammill and Basil Gabbidon)	4:30
8.	"Dead Loss Angeles" (with Phil Daniels and Wilko Johnson)	2:18
9.	"Nice 'n' Sleazy" (with Nicky Tesco, Basil Gabbidon and Nik Turner)	6:44
10.	"Bring on the Nubiles"" (with Richard Jobson and Wilko Johnson)	4:00
11.	"Peaches" (with Ian Dury, Toyah Willcox, John Turnbull and Davey Payne)	4:34
12.	"Bear Cage" (with Ian Dury, Toyah Willcox, Matthieu Hartley, John Turnbull and Davey Payne)	4:41
13.	"Duchess" (with Toyah Willcox)	2:44
14.	"No More Heroes" (with Richard Jobson)	3:49
15.	"Five Minutes" (with Richard Jobson & Larry Wallis)	4:13
16.	"Something Better Change" (with Toyah Willcox and Steve Hillage)	3:43
17.	"Down in the Sewer" (with Jake Burns, Steve Hillage and all guests)	7:36
Total length:		70:00

- A 1997 release of this recording by Hallmark Records contains the same tracks (not in the same order), except "(Get A) Grip (On Yourself)", "Hanging Around", "Bear Cage" and "Peaches".

== Personnel ==
Credits adapted from the album liner notes.

The Stranglers

- Jean-Jacques Burnel – bass, vocals
- Dave Greenfield – keyboards
- Jet Black – drums

Friends

- John Ellis – guitar on all tracks
- Steve Nisbett – rhythmic drum patterns
- Robert Smith – guitar on 2, 3
- Robert Fripp – guitar on 4–6
- Basil Gabbidon – guitar on 7, 9
- Wilko Johnson – guitar on 8, 10
- John Turnbull – guitar on 11, 12
- Larry Wallis – guitar on 15
- Steve Hillage – guitar on 16, 17
- Matthieu Hartley – keyboards on 12
- Nik Turner – saxophone on 9
- Davey Payne – saxophone on 11, 12
- Hazel O'Connor – vocals on 2, 3
- Peter Hammill – vocals on 4, 7
- Phil Daniels – vocals on 6, 8
- Nicky Tesco – vocals on 9
- Richard Jobson – vocals on 10, 14, 15
- Toyah Willcox – vocals on 13, 16, backing vocals on 11, 12
- Ian Dury – vocals on 11, 12
- Jake Burns – vocals on 17

Technical

- Mark Brennan – sleeve notes
- Robert Fairclough – sleeve notes, design, picture research (2002 reissue)
- Giovanni Scatola – remastering (2002 reissue)
