= All Live and All of the Night =

Live album by the Stranglers
- Released: 8 February 1988
- Recorded: 1985 and 1987
- Venue: Le Zénith, Paris; Hammersmith Odeon, London; The Reading Festival, Reading
- Genre: Punk rock; new wave; pop rock
- Length: 50:59
- Label: Epic
- Producer: The Stranglers; Ted Hayton

The Stranglers live albums chronology
Live (X Cert) (1979)	All Live and All of the Night (1988)	Live at the Hope and Anchor (1992)

Singles from All Live and All of the Night
- 1. "All Day and All of the Night" Released: December 1987

Alternative cover
- 1988 North American release

All Live and All of the Night is the second live album by English rock band the Stranglers, released on 8 February 1988 by Epic Records. The release peaked at No. 12 in the UK Albums Chart in March 1988.

== Background ==
By 1986, the band were onto their ninth studio album, Dreamtime, and had added a horn section to the live presentation. Although there had been demand for a new live album for some time, contractual obligations to their former record label EMI had prevented them from releasing any live recordings of their earlier material until 1987, making All Live and All of the Night their first live album to be released since 1979's Live (X Cert).

The concerts from which tracks were taken, span the period from April 1985 to August 1987. The live recording of "All Day and All of the Night" was dropped in favour of a "live" version specially recorded in the studio, as the true live recording was not considered to be up to the desired quality for this album.

== Critical reception ==
Professional ratings
Review scores
Source	Rating
AllMusic	3/5 stars
Encyclopedia of Popular Music	2/5 stars
The Great Rock Discography	4/10

In a retrospective review, AllMusic's Alex Ogg gave the album three stars out of five, writing, "While not as good as Live (X Cert), the Stranglers' live album it bookends, this does have some things to recommend it. First, it was recorded a decade down the line and was able to draw from a wellspring of generally excellent material. Secondly, at this stage in their career, the Stranglers remained just about relevant, and were still a robust live act." Ira Robbins of Trouser Press wrote, "Despite their recent wimpo work, onstage – banging out such classics as "London Lady," "Nice 'n' Sleazy" and "No More Heroes" with a horn section – they can convincingly revive the grungy electric power we used to know and love. ... fortunately, these concert renditions improve on the songs, providing them with a little context."

== Track listing ==
All tracks are written by the Stranglers (Jet Black, Jean Jacques Burnel, Hugh Cornwell and Dave Greenfield), except where noted.

No.	Title	Writer(s)	Length
1.	"No More Heroes"		3:48
2.	"Was It You?"		3:40
3.	"Down in the Sewer"		6:24
4.	"Always the Sun"		4:28
5.	"Golden Brown"		3:35
6.	"North Winds"		3:59
7.	"European Female"		3:41
8.	"Strange Little Girl"	Black, Burnel, Cornwell, Greenfield, Hans Wärmling	2:42
9.	"Nice 'n' Sleazy"		4:25
10.	"Toiler on the Sea"		6:26
11.	"Spain"		3:46
12.	"London Lady"		2:36
13.	"All Day and All of the Night" (studio version)	Ray Davies	2:26
Total length:			50:59

=== 1999 Japanese CD reissue bonus tracks ===
No.	Title	Writer(s)	Length
14.	"Souls"		3:18
15.	"Uptown"		3:00
16.	"Who Wants the World?"		3:03
17.	"Nuclear Device"		3:42
18.	"All Day and All of the Night" (live version)	Davies	2:32
19.	"Punch and Judy"		3:42
Total length:			70:16

=== 2001 CD reissue bonus tracks ===
The 2001 reissue omits the studio version of "All Day and All of the Night".

No.	Title	Writer(s)	Length
13.	"Souls"		3:22
14.	"Uptown"		2:32
15.	"Shakin' Like a Leaf"		2:45
16.	"Who Wants the World?"		2:59
17.	"Peaches"		3:49
18.	"Straighten Out"		2:54
19.	"Nuclear Device"		3:31
20.	"All Day and All of the Night" (live version)	Davies	2:23
21.	"Punch and Judy"		3:43
Total length:			76:53

== Recording information ==
- Live sets recorded at: Le Zénith, Paris, 29 April 1985; Hammersmith Odeon, London, 31 March 1987; The Reading Festival, 30 August 1987.
- Japanese bonus tracks recorded at: The Palais des Sports, Orléans, 28 April 1985 (tracks 14, 15); The Reading Festival, 30 August 1987 (track 16); Alexandra Palace, London, 11 August 1990 (tracks 17–19).
- 2001 bonus tracks recorded at: The Palais Des Sports, Orléans, 28 April 1985; St George's Hall, Bradford, 2 March 1990; Guildford Civic Hall, Guildford, 19 March 1990; Alexandra Palace, London, 11 August 1990.

== Personnel ==
Credits adapted from the album's liner notes.

The Stranglers

- Hugh Cornwell – guitar, lead and backing vocals
- Jean-Jacques Burnel – bass, lead and backing vocals
- Dave Greenfield – keyboards, backing vocals
- Jet Black – drums, percussion

Additional musicians

- Alex Gifford – saxophone, backing vocals
- Chris Lawrence – trombone, backing vocals
- Jason Votier – trumpet, backing vocals

Technical

- The Stranglers – production
- Ted Hayton – production, mixing
- Jet Black – mixing
- Mick McKenna – recording engineer (The Rolling Stones Mobile, Paris)
- Andy Rose – recording engineer (The Fleetwood Mobile, London)
- Martin Colley – recording engineer (The BBC Mobile, Reading)
- Jean Luke Epstein (Graphyk) – album sleeve
- Nik Yeomans – front and back cover photography
- Malcolm Heywood – centre photo
- Pennie Smith – original S.I.S. photo
- Ray Bracey – airbrushing
