= Saturday Night, Sunday Morning =

Live album by the Stranglers
- Released: June 1993
- Recorded: 11 August 1990
- Venue: Alexandra Palace, London
- Genre: Rock
- Length: 52:55
- Label: Castle Communications

The Stranglers live albums chronology
Live at the Hope and Anchor (1992)	Saturday Night, Sunday Morning (1993)	Death and Night and Blood (1994)

Saturday Night, Sunday Morning is a live album by the Stranglers, released in 1993 by Castle Communications.

By coincidence, it was guitarist Hugh Cornwell's last concert with the band that had been recorded for posterity. The tracks were mixed by Stuart MacMillan at Central Television Music Studio (Birmingham) in 1990. The mix session was attended by band members Jean-Jacques Burnel, Jet Black and Dave Greenfield, with Cornwell not attending. The title is a reference to the gig happening on a Saturday night and Cornwell announcing his departure the following day. It was also a title to a 1960 film.

The concert was split across an album and simultaneous VHS release, which contained different track listings. Between these releases all but one track ("School Mam") played at the concert are available. The video was given a DVD release in 2000, retitled Live At Alexandra Palace.

In addition, a live CD single from the same concert was released in January 1991 by Epic Records, containing the tracks "Always the Sun", "Nuclear Device", "All Day and all of the Night" and "Punch and Judy".

== Critical reception ==
Professional ratings
Review scores
Source	Rating
AllMusic	2/5 stars
Encyclopedia of Popular Music	2/5 stars
The Great Rock Discography	3/10

In a review for AllMusic, Alex Ogg gave the album two stars out of five, writing, "On this (generally) well-produced sound-desk recording, listeners are treated to a riot of traditional Stranglers fare, performed with typical, stony-faced aggression."

== Track listing ==
All tracks are written by the Stranglers (Jet Black, Jean Jacques Burnel, Hugh Cornwell and Dave Greenfield), except where noted

No.	Title	Writer(s)	Length
1.	"Toiler on the Sea"		7:32
2.	"96 Tears"	Rudy Martinez	3:00
3.	"Always the Sun"		4:33
4.	"No More Heroes"		3:50
5.	"Golden Brown"		3:57
6.	"Tank"		3:15
7.	"Strange Little Girl"	Black, Burnel, Cornwell, Greenfield, Hans Wärmling	3:37
8.	"Something Better Change"		2:42
9.	"Hanging Around"		4:44
10.	"All Day and All of the Night"	Ray Davies	2:30
11.	"Duchess"		2:23
12.	"Was It You?"/"Down in the Sewer"		10:46
Total length:			52:55

== Video track listing ==
1. "Toiler on the Sea"
2. "Something Better Change"
3. "96 Tears"
4. "Someone Like You"
5. "Sweet Smell of Success"
6. "Always the Sun"
7. "Strange Little girl"
8. "Hanging Around"
9. "Lets' Celebrate"
10. "Golden Brown"
11. "No More Heroes"
12. "Nuclear Device"
13. "Duchess"
14. "All Day and All of the Night"
15. "Punch and Judy"

== Personnel ==
The Stranglers

- Hugh Cornwell – vocals, guitar
- Jean-Jacques Burnel – bass, vocals
- Dave Greenfield – keyboards, vocals
- Jet Black – drums

Technical

- Stuart MacMillan – mixing
- John Pasche – design
