= 999 (band) =

English punk rock band

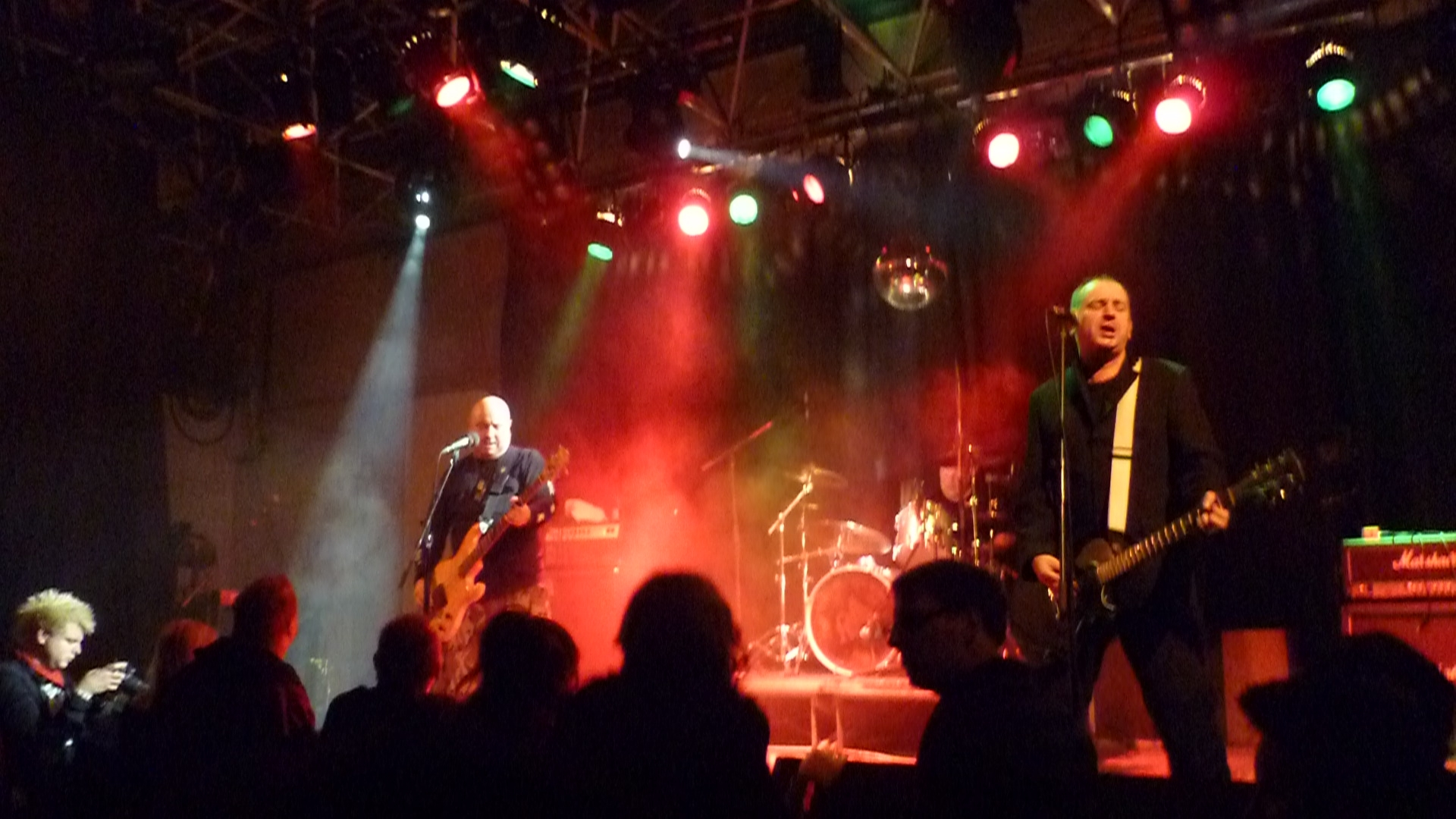
- 999 performing live in Düsseldorf, Germany, in 2010

Background information
- Origin: London, England, United Kingdom
- Genres: Punk rock; pop-punk; new wave
- Years active: 1977–1982; 1983–1987; 1993–present
- Labels: United Artists; Radar; Polydor; Albion
- Members: Nick Cash; Guy Days; Stuart Meadows; Arturo Bassick
- Past members: Pablo LaBritain; Jon Watson; Danny Palmer; Ed Case
- Website: nineninenine.net

999 are an English punk rock band, formed in London in December 1976. From 1976 to 1985, their line-up consisted of Nick Cash (vocals, guitar), Guy Days (lead guitar), Jon Watson (bass guitar) and Pablo LaBritain (drums). LaBritain was temporarily replaced in 1980 by drummer Paul Edwards (aka 'Ed Case') while he recovered from a car accident. Paul Edwards later went on to be the drummer in Hazel O'Connor's band. Bassist Jon Watson left the band in 1985 and was replaced by Danny Palmer, who was succeeded by Arturo Bassick in 1991.

Between 1978 and 2007, 999 released fourteen singles and twelve studio albums. Five of the singles released by 999 between 1978 and 1981 charted within the Top 75 in the UK singles chart, with one further single in 1978, "Homicide", charting within the Top 40. In addition, as a result of extensive touring in the United States in the early 1980s, the band's third and fourth studio albums, The Biggest Prize in Sport and Concrete, each charted on the U.S. Billboard 200.

Despite having formed in 1976, 999 have only experienced two permanent changes to their original line-up and have continued to record and play live, leading AllMusic to describe them as "one of the longest-lived groups of the punk era".

== Career ==
Named after the UK's emergency telephone number, 999 were founded in London by two brothers: singer and guitarist Nick Cash, and Guy Days. Cash was a member of the pub rock band Kilburn and the High Roads, and Days a session guitarist who played on some of the band's demo tapes. In late 1976 they placed an advertisement in Melody Maker for band members, and ended up turning down Chrissie Hynde (The Pretenders), Jon Moss (Culture Club) and Tony James (Generation X). They recruited Jon Watson on bass and Pablo LaBritain on drums, LaBritain having briefly played with the Clash. The band that eventually became known as 999 performed their first concert at the Northampton Cricket Club in January 1977. After experimenting with several different band names, they became 999 in May 1977.

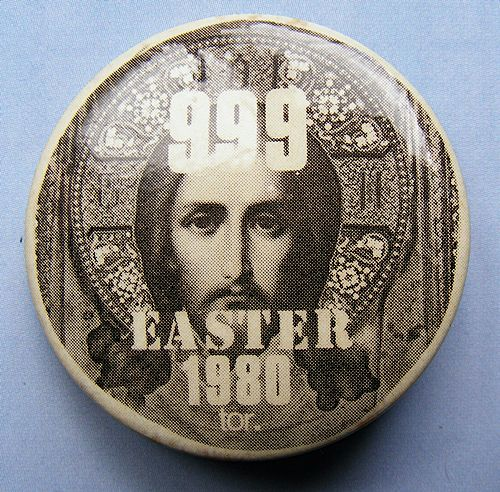
999 button, Toronto-the Edge Club present

999 soon established themselves as a powerful live act on the London punk scene, and became regulars at the Hope and Anchor, Islington. Their self-financed debut single "I'm Alive" was well received, becoming a firm favourite in the punk clubs. On the strength of it, 999 were signed to United Artists Records around the same time as the Buzzcocks. The band's second single, "Nasty Nasty", was cited nearly 20 years after its release as a seminal punk single.

Their self-titled debut album, produced by Andy Arthurs, was released in March 1978. One retrospective review claimed it "demonstrated their limitations as well as their strengths. The 45 cuts like "Me and My Desire" and "Emergency" demonstrated the latter, but the album lacked that special ingredient, uniqueness or originality to make it stand out from the crowd." The album reached No. 53 in the UK Albums Chart. The following year, the song "Emergency" from the album appeared – alongside songs by bands including the Jam and the Stranglers – on the punk compilation 20 of Another Kind. That album reached No. 45 in the UK chart. Years later, "Emergency" was included in Mojo magazine's list of the best punk rock singles of all time.

The band's second album, Separates, was produced by Martin Rushent. One reviewer lists it as one of the best punk albums of all time. In the United States, a slightly altered version of Separates, re-titled High Energy Plan, became the band's first American release. In October 1978, a month after the album's release, 999 recorded their only session for John Peel at BBC Radio 1. 999 also played at Front Row Festival, a three-week event at the Hope and Anchor in late November and early December 1977. This resulted in the band's inclusion, alongside the likes of Wilko Johnson, the Only Ones, the Saints, the Stranglers, X-Ray Spex, and XTC, on a hit double LP of recordings from the festival.

999 toured widely in the United States, and were rewarded when their albums The Biggest Prize In Sport and Concrete charted on the Billboard 200. In the US, "Homicide" and "Hollywood" garnered frequent rotation on 'Rock of the 80s'-format radio stations such as KROQ in Los Angeles. According to Dave Thompson, "For many Americans, they were the first to actually bother with the backwoods, playing places which other Brit bands hadn't heard of, and returning to them again and again. And while no one knows how many American bands were first inspired to take up arms by 999, those that did still wear their loyalties loudly."

Despite a number of minor hit singles, the band's critical appeal in Britain had begun to wane. Their stock was lifted temporarily with the arrival of the self-released Face To Face. 999's popularity continued to decline steadily, leading to the group disbanding twice in the 1980s, reforming soon afterwards. They have since released several albums and continue to tour, including playing at the 11th Antifest in 2005. Bassick also plays for The Lurkers.

== Members ==
Current members

- Nick Cash – lead vocals, guitar (1977–1982, 1983–1987, 1993–present)
- Guy Days – guitar, vocals (1977–1982, 1983–1987, 1993–present)
- Arturo Bassick – bass (1993–present)
- Stuart Meadows – drums (2018–present)

Former members

- Jon Watson – bass (1977–1982, 1983–1986)
- Danny Palmer – bass (1986–1987)
- Pablo LaBritain – drums (1977–1982, 1983–1986, 1993–2017)
- Ed Case – drums (1980)

== Discography ==
=== Studio albums ===
- 999 (March 1978, United Artists) – No. 53 UK
- Separates (September 1978, United Artists)
- The Biggest Prize in Sport (January 1980, Polydor) – No. 177 U.S.
- Concrete (April 1981, Albion) – No. 192 U.S.
- 13th Floor Madness (November 1983, Albion)
- Face to Face (March 1985, LaBritain)
- You Us It! (November 1993, Anagram)
- Takeover (March 1998, Get Back)
- Dancing in the Wrong Shoes (1999, Receiver Records – re-issue of Face to Face)
- Death in Soho (2007, Overground)
- Bish! Bash! Bosh! (April 2020, Cleopatra Records)

=== Compilation albums ===
- High Energy Plan (U.S./Canada release only: 1979, PVC / Radar / Passport) based upon Separates, it replaced various album tracks with various singles
- The Singles Album (1980, SOS)
- Identity Parade (1984, Albion Records)
- In Case of Emergency (1986, Dojo)
- The Early Stuff (The UA Years) (1992, EMI)
- The Albion Punk Years (1996, Anagram)
- Scandal in the City (1997, Line Music) re-issue of The Albion Punk Years
- Emergency (1997, Receiver)
- Slam (1999, Overground)
- The Punk Singles Collection: 1977–1980 (2001, Captain Oi)
- Outburst! Demos & Outtakes 77-79 (2003, Overground)
- The Sharpest Cuts 93-07 (2019, Gutterwail Records)
- Sharpest Cuts Too, Vol 2 (2023, Gutterwail Records)

=== Live albums ===
- The Biggest Tour in Sport – Recorded Live (1980, Polydor)
- Lust Power and Money (Live) (1987, A.B.C.)
- Live and Loud (1989, Link)
- The Cellblock Tapes (1990, Link)
- Live in L.A.: 1991 (1994)
- Live at the Nashville 1979 (1997, Anagram)
- English Wipeout: Live (2002, Overground)
- Nasty Tales: Live (2006, Secret Records)
- Bay Area Homicide (2016, Cleopatra Records) —4 disc box set
- Live (2021, Secret Records)
- 999 – Rip It Up! – Live at the Craufurd Arms – CD+DVD Album (2024, Secret Records)

=== Singles ===
- "I'm Alive" / "Quite Disappointing" (July 1977, LaBritain) re-released on United Artists in 1979
- "Nasty Nasty" / "No Pity" (October 1977, United Artists) also released as a 78 rpm promo disc
- "Emergency" / "My Street Stinks" (January 1978, United Artists) – No. 75
- "Me and My Desire" / "Crazy" (April 1978, United Artists)
- "Feelin' Alright with the Crew" / "Titanic (My Over) Reaction" / "You Can't Buy Me" (August 1978, United Artists)
- "Waiting" / "Action" (September 1978, LaBritain) free record given away with mail-order copies of the Separates LP
- "Homicide" / "Soldier" (October 1978, United Artists) – No. 40 UK
- "Found Out Too Late" / "Lie Lie Lie" (September 1979, Radar Records) – No. 69
- "Trouble" / "Make a Fool of You" (January 1980, Polydor)
- "Hollywood" / "Boiler" (April 1980, Polydor)
- "Boys in the Gang" / "Brent Cross" (Germany/Austria release only: 1980, Albion)
- "Obsessed" / "Change" / "Lie Lie Lie" (April 1981, Albion) – No. 71
- "Li'l Red Riding Hood" / "Waiting for Your Number to Be Called" / "I Ain't Gonna Tell Ya" (live) (June 1981, Albion) – No. 59
- "Indian Reservation" / "So Greedy" (remix) / "Taboo" (remix) (November 1981, Albion) – No. 51
- "Wild Sun" / "Scandal in the City" / "Bongos on the Nile" (June 1982, Albion) also released as a 12" single with "Don't You Know I Need You"
- "13th Floor Madness" / "Nightshift" / "Arabesque" (October 1983, Albion) also released as a 12" single
- "Arabesque" (1984)

=== Compilation and soundtrack appearances ===
- "Quite Disappointing" and "Crazy" on the Hope & Anchor Front Row Festival double compilation LP (March 1978, Warner Bros.) – UK No. 28
- "Emergency" and "Homicide" on 20 of Another Kind (February 1979, Polydor) – UK No. 45
- Urgh! A Music War – includes a live version on "Homicide" filmed and recorded at the Lyceum Ballroom in London on 17 September 1980
- "Obsessed" on Trauma (1979, Pickwick International Inc (GB) Ltd.)
- "Inside Out" featured on US version of Showtime Networks' Shameless
- A cover of "Homicide" performed by the Prairie Cartel appears on the Grand Theft Auto IV soundtrack
- "Homicide" appears on the documentary The Killing of America (1982) soundtrack
- "Homicide" appears on Too Old to Die Young, an American crime drama miniseries written by Nicolas Winding Refn and Ed Brubaker
- "Homicide" was covered by the band Error which included members of Bad Religion, Nine Inch Nails and the Dillinger Escape Plan; there is also a remix of the track on the Error EP

== Music videos ==
- "Emergency" (1978)
- "Homicide" (1978)
- "Obsessed" (1981)

== See also ==
- List of punk bands from the United Kingdom
- List of 1970s punk rock musicians
- List of Peel Sessions
