= Hope & Anchor Front Row Festival =

Live album by Various
- Released: March 1978
- Recorded: November 22 – December 15, 1977
- Venue: Hope and Anchor, Islington, London
- Genre: Power pop, pub rock, punk rock, new wave
- Label: Warner Bros. (Cat. No. K66077)
- Producer: various

Hope & Anchor Front Row Festival is a hit double-LP of live recordings taken from various bands – mainly power pop, pub rock, punk rock and new wave groups - that played the Front Row Festival at the Hope and Anchor, Islington between Tuesday 22 November and Thursday 15 December 1977. It reached number 28 in the UK Albums Chart.

The Hope & Anchor has been described as a "seminal live venue" in 1977, catering for "both emerging punk / new wave bands and the numerous pub rock acts operating on the live circuit at the time". The same author called the album as "eclectic" with "superb performances from artists like the Stranglers, the Only Ones, X-Ray Spex, the Saints and the Suburban Studs alongside staple pub rock acts".

== Original track listing ==
Side one:

1. "Dr. Feelgood" (Willie Lee Perryman) by The Wilko Johnson Band, produced by the Wilko Johnson Band
2. "Straighten Out" (The Stranglers) by The Stranglers, produced by Martin Rushent
3. "Styrofoam" (Sean Tyla) by The Tyla Gang, produced by Mark Dodson
4. "Don't Munchen It" (Johnny Spence, Mick Green) by The Pirates, produced by Vic Maile
5. "Speed Kills" (Steve Gibbons) by The Steve Gibbons Band, produced by Mike Robinson and Peter Meaden
6. "I'm Bugged" (Andy Partridge) by XTC, produced by John Leckie
7. "I Hate School" (Arthur Edward Hunt) by The Suburban Studs, produced by Del Spence

Side two:

1. "Billy" (Bo Benham, Steve McNerney) by The Pleasers, remixed by Tommy Boyce
2. "Science Friction" (Andy Partridge) by XTC, produced by John Leckie
3. "Eastbound Train" (Mark Knopfler) by Dire Straits, produced by Dire Straits
4. "Bizz Fizz" (Billy Jenkins, Ian Trimmer) by Burlesque, produced by Geoffrey Haslam
5. "Let's Submerge" (Poly Styrene) by X-Ray Spex, produced by Falcon Stuart
6. "Crazy" (Guy Days, Nick Cash) by 999, produced by Andy Arthurs

Side three:

1. "Demolition Girl" (Ed Kuepper) by The Saints, produced by Chris Bailey and Ed Kuepper
2. "Quite Disappointing" (Guy Days, Nick Cash) by 999, produced by Andy Arthurs
3. "Creature of Doom" (Peter Perrett) by The Only Ones, produced by Ed Hollis and The Only Ones
4. "Gibson Martin Fender" (Mick Green) by The Pirates, produced by Vic Maile
5. "Sound Check" (Steel Pulse) by Steel Pulse, produced by Godwin Logie
6. "Zero Hero" (Danny Adler) by Roogalator, produced by Robin Scott

Side four:

1. "Underground Romance" (Philip Rambow) by Philip Rambow, produced by Chris Briggs
2. "Rock & Roll Radio" (Norman Watson) by The Pleasers, remixed by Tommy Boyce
3. "On The Street" (Darrel De Vore) by The Tyla Gang, produced by Mark Dodson
4. "Johnny Cool" (Steve Gibbons) by The Steve Gibbons Band, produced by Mike Robinson and Peter Meaden
5. "Twenty Yards Behind" (Wilko Johnson) by The Wilko Johnson Band, produced by the Wilko Johnson Band
6. "Hanging Around" (The Stranglers) by The Stranglers, produced by Martin Rushent

== Personnel ==
- Clive Banks, Ian Grant - executive producer
- Tim Summerhayes - engineer
- Jonathan Clyde - coordinator
- George Snow - sleeve design, concept
