= Live at Alexandra Palace =

Live at Alexandra Palace may refer to:

- Live at Alexandra Palace, a 2005 album by Faithless
- Live at Alexandra Palace, a 2016 album by Enter Shikari
- Live at Alexandra Palace, the title of the 2000 DVD release of the Stranglers' 1993 live album Saturday Night, Sunday Morning
