= Death in Soho =

Compilation album by 999
- Released: September 24, 2007
- Recorded: July 2007
- Studio: Perry Vale Studios
- Genre: Punk rock
- Label: Overground

Professional ratings
Review scores
Source	Rating
AllMusic	3.5/5 stars

Death in Soho is the latest album released by the English punk band 999, released in September 2007.

== Track listing ==
All tracks by Nick Cash & Guy Days except where noted.

1. "Gimme the World" – 2:22
2. "The System" – 3:02
3. "Innocent" – 4:08
4. "Last Breathe" (Cash, Days, Pablo Labritain) – 3:18
5. "99 Days" – 2:31
6. "Rock N Roll World" – 2:30
7. "Get Off the Phone" – 3:04
8. "Horror Story" – 2:11
9. "Stealing Beauty" – 2:12
10. "What Do You Know" – 2:18
11. "Deep Peace" – 2:37
12. "Too Much Money" – 2:39
13. "Life of Crime" – 2:22
14. "The Avenue" – 3:10
15. "Bomb You" – 2:07

== Personnel ==
999

- Arturo Bassick – bass, vocals
- Nick Cash – guitar, vocals
- Guy Days – guitar, vocals
- Pablo Labritain – drums, vocals

Technical

- Pat Collier – engineer
