= The Biggest Prize in Sport =

Studio album by 999
- Released: 18 January 1980
- Recorded: August 1979
- Genre: Pop punk, new wave
- Length: 46:43
- Label: Polydor
- Producer: Vic Maile

999 chronology
Separates (1978)	The Biggest Prize in Sport (1980)	Concrete (1981)

The Biggest Prize in Sport is the third studio album by English punk/rock band 999. It peaked at No. 177 on the U.S. Billboard Album Chart. The album was re-released on CD in 1999 on Anagram Records. Nick Cash: "Pablo (Labritain) broke his arm in ’78, two days before we were doing a show at the SO36 Club in Berlin. Ed (Case) was part of our following, the Southall Crew. We went to the rehearsal and he knew all the songs note perfect. He was very young, about 17. He was fantastic and got a standing ovation. He was a brilliant drummer. From that, Ed then went on to play with Hazel O'Connor, and then worked at the Victoria Theatre playing the drummer in Buddy the Musical."

== Reception ==
Professional ratings
Review scores
Source	Rating
AllMusic	4.5/5 stars
Smash Hits	5/10

Trouser Press called the album "trebly and lifeless, except for the poppy title track, which sounds like an East End Ramones."

=== Charts ===
Year	Chart	Peak Posizion
1980	US Billboard 200	177

== Track listing ==
Tracks of the US and Canada releases of the album are in a different order than the UK and European releases. The 1999 CD release has the same track listing of the UK/EU edition, and three bonus tracks.

All tracks are written by Nick Cash and Guy Days, except where noted.

Side one
No.	Title	Writer(s)	Length
1.	"Boys in the Gang"		2:45
2.	"Inside Out"		2:02
3.	"Trouble"		2:32
4.	"So Long"		2:44
5.	"Fun Thing"		3:35
6.	"The Biggest Prize in Sport"	Nick Cash, Guy Days, Jon Watson	3:00

Side two
No.	Title	Writer(s)	Length
1.	"Hollywood"		3:01
2.	"Stranger"		3:13
3.	"Stop! Stop!"		2:04
4.	"English Wipeout"		3:27
5.	"Shake"		2:26
6.	"Boiler"	Nick Cash, Guy Days, Pablo Labritain, Jon Watson	3:47
Total length:			46:43

1999 CD bonus tracks
No.	Title	Writer(s)	Length
13.	"Made a Fool of You"	Jon Watson	3:15
14.	"Found out to Late"		3:40
15.	"Lie Lie Lie"		2:59
Total length:			56:37

== Personnel ==
999

- Nick Cash – lead vocals, guitar
- Guy Days – guitar, backing vocals
- Jon Watson – bass, backing vocals
- Eddie Case – drums, backing vocals

Production

- Vic Maile – producer (original LP)
- Malcolm Garrett – artwork
- Chris Gabrin – photography

== Release history ==
Region	Date	Label	Format	Catalog
Canada	1979	Polydor Records	LP	PD-1-6256
Germany	1979	Albion Records	LP	POLSC 1013
Germany	1979	Albion Records, Ariola Records	LP	201 331-320
Netherlands	1979	Ariola Benelux B.V., Polydor Records	LP	201 331-320, 201 331
United States	1979	Polydor Records	LP, promo	PD-1-6256
United States	1980	Polydor Records	LP	PD-1-6256
United Kingdom	1980	Polydor Records	LP	POLS 1013
United States	1980	Polydor Records	LP	PD-1-6256
France, Greece	1980	Polydor Records	LP	2383 563
Norway, Sweden	1980	Albion Records	LP	9198 728
United Kingdom	1999	Anagram Records	CD	CD Punk 67
