= Sometimes (Stranglers song) =

1977 song by the Stranglers

Single by the Stranglers

from the album Rattus Norvegicus
- B-side: "Go Buddy Go"
- Released: October 1977
- Recorded: TW Studios
- Genre: Punk rock; new wave
- Length: 4:56
- Label: United Artists
- Songwriters: Hugh Cornwell; Jean-Jacques Burnel; Dave Greenfield; Jet Black
- Producer: Martin Rushent

The Stranglers singles chronology
"No More Heroes" (1977)	"Sometimes" (1977)	"5 Minutes" (1978)

"Sometimes" is a song by English rock band the Stranglers, appearing as the first song on their debut album Rattus Norvegicus (1977). The song was written and sung by Hugh Cornwell, and credited to the band as a whole.

It was released as a single in Japan in 1977 with the B-side of "Go Buddy Go".

== Overview ==
The song has a distinctive leitmotif played throughout on the keyboards, backed by a heavy bass riff which repeats throughout the song. The lyrics tell of an aggressive narrator's feelings towards a person, presumably their significant other, and it tells of their feelings of wanting to hit them. The song features a guitar and keyboard solo played in the call and response style during its climactic bridge before reprising its elongated chorus.

== Writing and composition ==
The lyrics were written by Hugh Cornwell, inspired by an altercation between him and his girlfriend in which he caught her cheating on him and proceeded to hit her. The music was written predominantly by Jean-Jacques Burnel, with Cornwell adding various pieces of music to Burnel's riff. The song is in the key of E minor, and features a large instrumental passage during its bridge.

== Personnel ==
- Hugh Cornwell – lead vocals, lead and rhythm guitar
- Jean-Jacques Burnel – backing vocals, bass guitar
- Dave Greenfield – Hammond organ, Hohner electric piano
- Jet Black – drums
