= Eddie and Sunshine =

Electronic synth-pop cabaret duo of early 1980s

Eddie and Sunshine were an electronic synthpop cabaret duo of the early eighties, comprising Eddie Maelov (real name Eddie Francis) and Sunshine Patteson (now working as Sunshine Gray), both previously founder members of the punk rock band Gloria Mundi. They released a number of singles and one album, Perfect Strangers, on Human Records and Survival Records (a label the duo founded, with the members of Drinking Electricity) and toured in Britain and Europe. They also had their own residency at Raymond's Revue Bar (Boulevard Theatre) with a show called Living TV, and were special guests on BBC 2's Riverside. Long-term friends of members of the band Ultravox, they supported them on the 1981 Rage in Eden UK and European tours. Their label offered opportunities to Faith Global, Maelov and Gray's friend Steve Shears' (ex-Ultravox) band, and Hard Corps to record some material.

== Discography ==
=== Albums ===
- 1983: Perfect Strangers (Survival Records)

=== Singles ===
- 1981: "Lines" b/w "The last Bouquet" / "Another Teardrop" b/w "At the Cabaret" / "Another Teardrop", "At the Cabaret", "Times Are Hard" (Human)
- 1983: "All I See Is You" b/w "Somewhere Else in Europe" (Survival)
- 1983: "Perfect Stranger" b/w "Conversation Piece" (Survival)
- 1983: "There's Someone Following Me" b/w "Echo" (Survival)

=== Compilation appearances ===
- 1981: Fools Rush in Where Angels Fear to Tread (Cabaret Futura compilation) (Martyrwell)
- 1983: Dance Report
