= Something Better Change (song) =

1977 single by the Stranglers

Single by The Stranglers

from the album No More Heroes
- A-side: "Straighten Out"
- Released: 22 July 1977
- Genre: Punk rock; new wave
- Length: 3:37
- Label: United Artists
- Songwriters: Hugh Cornwell; Jean-Jacques Burnel; Dave Greenfield; Jet Black
- Producer: Martin Rushent

The Stranglers singles chronology
"Peaches" / "Go Buddy Go" (1977)	"Something Better Change" / "Straighten Out" (1977)	"No More Heroes" (1977)

"Something Better Change", is a single by the Stranglers from the band's second album No More Heroes. It was released as a double A-side with "Straighten Out" in July 1977, and reached number 9 on the UK Singles Chart.

== Background ==
"Something Better Change" was written during the summer of 1976 with the lyrics by Jean-Jacques Burnel and the music by Hugh Cornwell, and is a commentary on the punk revolution that was occurring. It was recorded during the recording sessions for the Stranglers' first album Rattus Norvegicus between January and February 1977 at T.W. Studios in Fulham. However, it was left off that album, with Cornwell suggesting that this was because the song is not as dark as the rest of the songs on Rattus Norvegicus.

== Charts ==
Chart (1977)	Peak position
Belgium (Ultratop 50 Wallonia)	49
Netherlands (Dutch Top 40)	32
Netherlands (Single Top 100)	29
UK Singles (OCC)	9
