= Intaferon =

English new wave duo

- Origin: England
- Genres: New wave, synthpop
- Instruments: Piano, synthesizer
- Years active: 1983–1984
- Label: Chrysalis
- Past members: Simon Fellowes; Simon Gillham

Intaferon was a short-lived English new wave duo, consisting of Simon Fellowes and Simon Gillham. They were signed to Chrysalis Records. Their song "Get Out of London" (produced by Martin Rushent) was featured in the 2001 Mary-Kate and Ashley Olsen film Winning London.

Singles were often featured on the Channel 4 show The Max Headroom Show.

Simon Fellowes, after releasing two further albums as Simon F and another using the moniker F Machine, is now an author. He has three published novels - Don't Breathe the Air, My Name Is Ferdinand and 10 Dead Mexicans.

== Discography ==
=== Singles ===
- "Steamhammer Sam" (1983) - UK No. 77 (music video features Jack Watson)
- "Get Out of London" (1983) - UK No. 93
- "Baby Pain" (1984) (also released on Simon F's 1985 solo album Gun)

Simon Fellowes released other solo singles as Simon F, including "American Dream" and "Love Bomb", with the former peaking at No. 91 in the US.
