= (Get A) Grip (On Yourself) =

1977 single by the Stranglers

Single by the Stranglers

from the album Rattus Norvegicus
- A-side: "London Lady"
- Released: 28 January 1977
- Recorded: December 1976
- Studio: T.W. Studios, Fulham
- Genre: Punk rock; new wave
- Length: 3:55
- Label: United Artists
- Songwriters: Hugh Cornwell; Jean-Jacques Burnel; Dave Greenfield; Jet Black
- Producer: Martin Rushent

The Stranglers singles chronology
"(Get A) Grip (On Yourself)" / "London Lady" (1977)	"Peaches" / "Go Buddy Go" (1977)

"Grip", or "(Get A) Grip (On Yourself)", is a single by the Stranglers from the album Rattus Norvegicus. It was the Stranglers' first single, released as a double A-side with "London Lady" in January 1977, and reached number 44 on the UK Singles Chart.

== Background ==
"Grip" was written by Hugh Cornwell whilst the Stranglers were renting a house in Chiddingfold, where they had been based since 1975. He later said he was "very proud of it because it was my song completely. I was constantly writing songs by myself and this was the first one where I felt I'd really cracked it". In the first line of the lyrics, there is reference to a "Morry Thou", a slang term for a Morris Minor 1000.

In 1976, "Grip" was sent as a three-track demo, along with "Bitching" and "Go Buddy Go", to various record companies in an attempt to sign a record deal. Martin Rushent, who had been working as an engineer for a number of years, took the role of assistant to the head of A&R at United Artists Records, Andrew Lauder. On his first day in the role, he was played the demo of "Grip", and was asked for his opinion on whether United Artists should sign the Stranglers. Rushent's response was "well on the strength of that song I would sign them tomorrow". After then seeing the Stranglers perform at the Red Cow in Hammersmith, Rushent also offered to produce the band. The Stranglers signed for United Artists at the beginning of December 1976 and then immediately went into the studio to record "Grip" and "London Lady". The single was later that month announced for release on 28 January 1977.

"Grip" features a saxophone by Welsh coal miner Eric Clark, who was a friend of the Stranglers co-manager Dai Davies.

== Release ==
Following its release, "Grip" was moderately successful, spending four weeks in the UK top-fifty, peaking at number 44. Apparently, there was an error by the chart compilers, BMRB, where sales for "Grip" were accidentally assigned to Silver Convention's "Everybody's Talking 'Bout Love" which peaked at number 25 during the first week of February. However, by the time the error was noticed it was too late to rectify. Despite having sold 15,000 copies by its second week, "Grip" only entered the chart that second week, reaching its peak two weeks later with the single unable to improve on the initial sales it had received.

Reviewing for New Music Express, Tony Parsons described the record as "a stunning double-sided single of distinctive, intelligent, contemporary rock'n'roll that sounds like Roxy Music would have if that old capped-tooth smoothie Ferry had been influenced by The Doors".

In January 1989, a remixed version of "Grip" was released as a single. It was remixed by Barry Cooder and Taff B. Dylan was released with the B-side "Waltzinblack", taken from the Stranglers' 1981 album The Gospel According to the Meninblack. This version charted more highly than the original, peaking at number 33 in the UK.

== Personnel ==
- Hugh Cornwell – lead vocals, electric guitar
- Jean-Jacques Burnel – backing vocals, bass guitar
- Dave Greenfield – keyboards
- Jet Black – drums
- Eric Clark – tenor saxophone

== Charts ==
Chart (1977)	Peak position
UK Singles (OCC)	44

Chart (1989)	Peak position
UK Singles (OCC)	33
