= Suburban Studs =

English music band

The Suburban Studs were an English punk rock band, formed in Birmingham in 1976.

== Line-up ==
- Vocals, guitar - Eddy Zipps
- Guitar - Keith Owen
- Bass - Paul Morton
- Drums - Steve Poole
- Saxophone - Steve Heart (Removed from line-up early)

Reformed in 1996 for Holidays in the sun 3 day punk festival in Blackpool.

- Vocals - guitar - Eddie Hunt (eddie zipps)
- Guitar - Keith Owen
- Bass Guitar - Roger Wilson
- Drums - Dave Fell

== Releases ==
The band were signed to Pogo Records, an independent record label who had a distribution deal with WEA. Their only album, Slam, was released in 1977. It has recently been re-released by Anagram Records with extra tracks. They had two singles, "Questions" / "No Faith", released in 1977 and "I Hate School" / "Young Power", in 1978. None of their releases were hits.

They also appeared on the Hope & Anchor Front Row Festival double compilation (March 1978).

More recently they can be found on the Holidays in the Sun CD and DVD from the Blackpool 3 day punk festival in 1996.

Slam was re-released as an "expanded version" via Cherry Red Records on January 12, 2024.

== Live shows ==
Suburban Studs' fame results from their huge gigging schedule. They played the 100 Club gig in 1976 supporting the Sex Pistols and The Clash, and headlined above The Clash in Birmingham in the same year.

The band also toured with AC/DC and Judas Priest, played a Peel Session and appeared on an ATV punk special.

Their erstwhile saxophonist Steve Heart later went on to form the Neon Hearts, who were to become popular around the Midlands.

The band continued for another 18 months under the name "the studs" with new frontman and vocalist Steve "Bertie" Burton ( "Starfighters" the E numbers, vincent flatts final drive) Eddie Zipps continued to write the songs and play guitar in the band.

The band reformed for a short while in 1996, with Eddie on vocals and Keith Owen on guitar, they were joined by bass guitarist Roger Wilson (little Sister, Even Bigger) and drummer Dave Fell.

They performed at the Holidays in the Sun gig at Blackpool in 1996 and are featured on the CD and DVD of the three-day festival, they split up soon after this gig.
