= The Pleasers =

UK musical group

- Origin: West London/Surrey, England
- Genres: Power pop
- Years active: 1977–79, 2009
- Labels: Solid Gold Records, Warner Bros. Records, Arista Records, Ariola Records
- Past members: Stephen Benham; Steve McNerney; Nick Powell; Dave Rotchelle

The Pleasers are an English power pop group. They were founded in 1977 in West London, England. Stephen Benham, Steve McNerney, Nick Powell and Dave Rotchelle were the founding members of the group. They released five singles; one on Solid Gold Records (released on Ariola Records in West Germany), and the remaining on Arista Records. They contributed two tracks ("Billy" and "Rock & Roll Radio") to the Hope & Anchor Front Row Festival LP record. These songs from their Studio recordings were eventually released in the United Kingdom on compact disc in 1996. Bonus tracks were releases in Japan in 2009. The Pleasers were managed by Chips Chipperfield (born circa-1943 – died 13 August 2008), who went on to win two Grammy Awards for Best Long Form Music Video as co-producer with Neil Aspinall in 1997 for The Beatles Anthology, and in 2000 for Band of Gypsys – Live at Fillmore East featuring Jimi Hendrix. The Pleasers' records were produced by experienced record producers i.e.Geoff Haslam, Ron Richards and Tommy Boyce.

== Band members ==
Stephen Benham (birth registered September 1955 in Epping) composer, bass guitar and vocals, went on to produce New Music Television, and is currently a managing director of InTune Music Library and Sound Street Radio Tokyo/London.

Steve McNerney (birth registered January→March 1958 (age 67–68) in Paddington district) vocals and guitar, is a composer and songwriter, and has provided music for documentaries including; Led Zeppelin: Dazed and Confused, Pink Floyd: Behind the Wall, Lady Gaga: One Sequin at a Time, Michael Jackson: Life of a Superstar, Michael Jackson: Unmasked, Britney Spears: Unbreakable, AC DC: Dirty Deeds, Jimi Hendrix: Hendrix on Hendrix, the featured song "We All Need Love" in Strays written/directed/starring Vin Diesel, the featured song "Changing Man" in Deadliest Catch, and five featured songs in 16 and Pregnant.

Nick Powell (guitarist)|Nick Powell lead guitar and vocals.

Dave Rotchelle (birth registered October→December 1952 in Hammersmith district 1952 (age 73–74)) drums, had previously been a member of The Rockets, and later The Count Bishops, and is currently a freelance photographer, and chairman of National Union of Journalists Freelance London Branch. Dave died on 3 November 2020.

While they were members of The Pleasers, Steve McNerney and Nick Powell were involved in a car accident towards the end of 1977, but both escaped with only bruises and sprains, although their car was a write-off.

== Newspaper and magazine appearances ==
The Pleasers were featured in the edition of 6 December 1977 of the Evening Standard, were the front cover artist in the edition of 14 January 1978 of the Record Mirror, were the co-front cover artists (alongside; The Boyfriends, etc.) in the edition of 21 January 1978 of the NME, were a featured artist in the January 1978 edition of ZigZag magazine, were featured in the edition of January 1978 of Sounds, and were featured in a 2007 edition of Mojo.

== Television appearances ==
The Pleasers television début was a performance of "(You Keep on Tellin' Me) Lies" on Get It Together, performed "Billy" and "The Kids Are Alright" on Tony Wilson's What's On prior to appearing at Rafters nightclub, Manchester on 18 March 1978, performed "The Kids Are Alright" on Crackerjack, Cheggers Plays Pop, and The Paul Nicholas Show, performed "You Don't Know" on Get It Together, and performed "A Girl I Know (Precis of a Friend)" on Get It Together.

== Concerts ==
The Pleasers' first gig in 30 years entitled 'Making the Modern Scene 2' was a benefit concert for rock journalist and author Terry Rawlings, who is ill with cancer, and took place at the 100 Club, Oxford Street, London on 26 July 2009, one of the support acts was a supergroup comprising Steve Diggle of the Buzzcocks, Mick Jones of The Clash, and Glen Matlock of the Sex Pistols, in addition, Simon Fowler from Ocean Colour Scene also played, and the gig was attended by members of The Purple Hearts, The Chords, Kenney Jones (Small Faces, The Who), Dennis Greaves (Nine Below Zero/The Truth), Mark Feltham (Nine Below Zero), Bermondsey Joy Riders (Cock Sparrer/Heavy Metal Kids), the DJs were Eddie Pillar and Gary Crowley, and the MC was Danny Baker.

== Discography ==
In addition to the following album and single releases, The Pleasers also recorded versions of; "No Particular Place to Go" (written by Chuck Berry), and "Think It Over" (written by Buddy Holly, Jerry Allison, and Norman Petty), these and other tracks are available on Myspace.

=== Albums ===
==== LP record ====
- Hope & Anchor Front Row Festival, Warner Bros. Records 66077, 1978
  - Side-2 Track-1 "Billy" (written by Stephen 'Bo' Benham and Steve McNerney)
  - Side-4 Track-2 "Rock & Roll Radio" (written by Dave Watson)

==== Compact disc ====
- Thamesbeat, Lost Moment Records, 5021449255221, recorded 1977–78 and released-1996. All tracks written by Stephen 'Bo' Benham and Steve McNerney except as indicated †, and all tracks produced by Tommy Boyce except tracks 13–15 indicated ‡ which were produced by Geoff Haslam;
  - 01. "Billy"
  - 02. "Troublemaker"
  - 03. "You Don't Know"
  - 04. "Let's Dance" † (written by Jim Lee)
  - 05. "Stay With Me"
  - 06. "The Kids Are Alright" † (written by Pete Townshend)
  - 07. "A Girl I Know (Precis of a Friend)"
  - 08. "Rock 'n' Roll Radio" † (written by Dave Watson)
  - 09. "Don't Go Breaking My Heart"
  - 10. "My Girlfriend's Back" † (written by Bob Feldman, Jerry Goldstein, Richard Gottehrer)
  - 11. "I'm in Love"
  - 12. "Change My Mind"
  - 13. "(You Keep on Tellin' Me) Lies" ‡
  - 14. "I'm in Love" (Alternative version) ‡
  - 15. "Who Are You?" ‡
  - 16. "You Know What I'm Thinking Girl"
  - 17. "Hello Little Girl"
- The following were bonus tracks on the Japanese release issued by Air Mail Recordings, in January 2009
  - 18. "Tommy Boyce"
  - 19. "Tears in My Eyes"
  - 20. "Are You The One"
  - 21. "Love Me Better"
  - 22. "Be Here Tonight"
  - 23. "Tell Me What You're Doing"
  - 24. "Interlude"

=== Singles ===
- "You Know What I'm Thinking Girl" (Benham/McNerney) / "Hello Little Girl" (Benham/McNerney) – Solid Gold Records SGR 104/Ariola Records 17 867 AT – 13 May 1977 – produced by Ron Richards
- "(You Keep on Tellin' Me) Lies" / "I'm in Love" (Benham/McNerney) and "Who Are You?" (Benham/McNerney) – Arista 152 – 25 November 1977 – produced by Geoff Haslam
- "The Kids Are Alright" (Pete Townshend) / "Stay With Me" (Benham/McNerney) – Arista 180 – 31 March 1978 – produced by Tommy Boyce
- "You Don't Know" (Benham/McNerney) / "Billy" (Benham/McNerney) – Arista 209 – August 1978 – produced by Tommy Boyce
- "A Girl I Know (Precis of a Friend)" (Benham/McNerney) / "Don't Go Breaking My Heart" (Benham/McNerney) – Arista 217 – 10 November 1978 – produced by Tommy Boyce – engineered by Phil Chapman
