= Goodbye Toulouse =

Song by The Stranglers

from the album Rattus Norvegicus
- Released: 15 April 1977
- Studio: TW Studios
- Genre: Art punk
- Length: 3:12
- Label: United Artists
- Songwriters: Hugh Cornwell, Jean-Jacques Burnel, Dave Greenfield, Jet Black
- Producer: Martin Rushent

"Goodbye Toulouse" is a song by English rock band the Stranglers. It was the second song on their 1977 debut album, Rattus Norvegicus. The lyrics were written by Jean-Jacques Burnel and the music by Hugh Cornwell, although the song was credited to the band as a whole.

== Overview ==
The song tells of Nostradamus' predictions for the French town of Toulouse, acting as a “goodbye” to the town. Cornwell refers to the song as “very unpunk”.

== Writing and composition ==
The music was written by Cornwell, and the lyrics were later written by Burnel. Initially, Burnel wanted to sing, but because his bass line was so frenetic, Cornwell agreed to perform the vocals. At the time, this was an oddity, as the pair usually sang their own individual lyrics. Burnel's lyrics were inspired by Nostradamus' predictions that there would be a cataclysmic event at Toulouse, and he wrote the song as a “goodbye” to the town. The song begins with Dave Greenfield's signature organ effect, shifting up and down in tone until the drums, bass, guitar, and keyboards all eventually come in throughout the song. The song's guitar solo features heavy amounts of delay and multitracking, giving the effect of two guitar solos in unison. The explosion sound effect at the end is meant to represent an atomic meltdown of the town.

== Personnel ==
- Hugh Cornwell – lead vocals, lead and rhythm guitar
- Jean-Jacques Burnel – backing vocals, bass guitar
- Dave Greenfield – backing vocals, Hammond organ
- Jet Black – drums
