= Screen 3 =

- Origin: Norwich, England
- Genres: Post-punk, new wave
- Years active: 1980–1984, 1990-1992
- Label: Epic
- Past members: Neil Dyer; Richard Kett; Brett Cooper; Peter Jay; Jason Votier; Keith Wyatt

Screen 3 were an English post-punk/new wave band from Norwich, active from 1980 to 1984 and again from 1990 to 1992.

== History ==
Heavily influenced by The Cure's first album, the original Screen 3 lineup formed in 1980, consisting of Neil Dyer (guitar and vocals), Richard Kett (bass) and Brett Cooper (drums). Trumpet players Peter Jay and Jason Votier were added in late 1981.

Screen 3's first recorded appearance was on a Norwich compilation called Norwich - A Fine City, which featured two of the band's tracks, "Live and Learn" and "Shades of Black". This was followed by an independently released 7" single, "New Blood", which garnered interest from Epic, who signed Screen 3.

The "Hearts in Limbo" single was recorded at Rockfield Studios in Wales, and produced by Roger Lomas, who produced Bad Manners and some of the Selecter's 2 Tone releases.

The next single, "Come Into My Jungle", came closest to success, garnering significant radio play but meagre sales. It was produced by Steve Brown, who also produced the first Wham! album and the second Cult album.

Their last single on Epic was the less successful "City of Souls", also released as a 12" EP.

Screen 3 recorded two John Peel sessions in 1983, and one in 1982 for fellow Radio 1 DJ Kid Jensen.

They supported various bigger acts during their original career, either on tours or one-off concerts, including Elvis Costello, Split Enz, Madness, The Teardrop Explodes, Aztec Camera and Men at Work.

After Epic dropped the band, Screen 3 used their remaining cash to self-release a compilation 12" EP in spring 1984, featuring Screen 3's "The Visitor" backed by tracks by two other local Norwich bands. The band split up soon after.

Trumpet player Votier later played with the Stranglers for a couple of years, appearing on their live album All Live and All of the Night. Guest musician Steve Osborne, who played trombone on Screen 3's later live gigs, became an acclaimed record producer.

== Reformation ==
Screen 3 reformed in 1990, originally including Dyer, Votier (on keyboards instead of trumpet), Kett and Cooper. Votier and Kett did not stay long, so the group later added bassist Keith Wyatt. No records were released by this lineup and they played exclusively new material. The band split again in 1992.

== Discography ==
=== Singles and EPs ===
- 1981: "New Blood"/"European Journey" 7" single (Romans in Britain Records)
- 1982: "Hearts in Limbo"/"A Small Part" 7" single (Epic)
- 1983: "Come Into My Jungle"/"The Dividing Line" 7" single (Epic)
- 1983: "City of Souls" 12" EP (Epic)

=== Compilation appearances ===
- 1981: "Live and Learn" and "Shades of Black" on Norwich - A Fine City LP (Romans in Britain Records)
- 1984: "The Visitor (12" Pizza Mix)" on Music from the East Zone 12" EP (Gross Product)
