= Separates =

Studio album by 999
- Released: October 1978
- Recorded: Summer 1978
- Genre: Pop punk, punk rock
- Length: 38:45
- Label: United Artists
- Producer: Martin Rushent

999 chronology
999 (1978)	Separates (1978)	The Biggest Prize in Sport (1980)

Professional ratings
Review scores
Source	Rating
AllMusic	4.5/5 stars
The Village Voice	B

Separates is the second album by English punk rock band 999, released in 1978. Separates was released in the United States under the title High Energy Plan, with a different cover and slightly altered track listing; on High Energy Plan, "Tulse Hill Night" and "Out of Reach" are replaced by "Waiting" and "Action".

== Track listing ==
All tracks composed by Nick Cash and Guy Days; except where indicated

Side 1

1. "Homicide" – 4:25
2. "Tulse Hill Night" – 3:00
3. "Rael Rean" – 3:24
4. "Let's Face It" – 3:50
5. "Crime (Parts 1 & 2)" (Andy Arthurs, Cash, Days, Pablo LaBritain, Jon Watson) – 4:31

Side 2

1. "Feelin' Alright with the Crew" – 3:32
2. "Out of Reach" (Cash, Watson) – 3:20
3. "Subterfuge" – 2:31
4. "Wolf" – 3:43
5. "Brightest View" – 3:38
6. "High Energy Plan" (Arthurs, Cash, Phil Chambon) – 2:49

=== 2000 CD reissue bonus tracks ===
12. "You Can't Buy Me" – 2:44
13. "Soldier" – 2:56
14. "Waiting" – 3:01
15. "Action" – 3:03

== Personnel ==
999

- Nick Cash – guitar, vocals
- Guy Days – guitar, vocals
- Pablo LaBritain – drums
- Jon Watson – bass

Technical

- Martin Rushent – production
- Alan Winstanley – engineering
- Paul Henry – art direction, design
- Toscani – photography
