= 999 (album) =

Studio album by 999
- Released: March 1978
- Recorded: 1977
- Studio: Olympic Studios, London
- Genre: Pop punk, punk rock
- Length: 35:30
- Label: United Artists
- Producer: Andy Arthurs

999 chronology
999 (1978)	Separates (1978)

Professional ratings
Review scores
Source	Rating
AllMusic	4/5 stars
Record Collector	3/5 stars

999 is the debut album by English punk rock band 999. It contained such singles as September 1977's "I'm Alive"/"Quite Disappointing" and October 1977's "Nasty Nasty"/"No Pity". The album also contained "Emergency", which was the start of the band's more distinctive approach to their previous punk sound.

"Emergency" was issued as a single on 13 January 1978, as was "Me And My Desire" on 7 April 1978.

== Track listing ==
All tracks are written by Nick Cash and Guy Days, except where noted

Side one
No.	Title	Writer(s)	Length
1.	"Me and My Desire"		3:48
2.	"Chicane Destination"		2:43
3.	"Crazy"		3:39
4.	"Your Number Is My Number"		2:59
5.	"Hit Me"		2:56
6.	"I'm Alive"	Cash; Days; Jon Watson	2:35

Side two
No.	Title	Writer(s)	Length
1.	"Titanic (My Over) Reaction"		3:34
2.	"Pick It Up"		2:44
3.	"Emergency"		2:53
4.	"No Pity"		2:00
5.	"Direct Action Briefing"		2:21
6.	"Nobody Knows"	Cash; Days; Pablo LaBritain; Watson	3:14

2000 CD reissue bonus tracks
No.	Title	Length
13.	"Quite Disappointing"	2:11
14.	"Nasty Nasty"	2:03
15.	"My Street Stinks"	1:44

== Personnel ==
999

- Nick Cash – guitar, vocals
- Guy Days – guitar, vocals
- Pablo LaBritain – drums
- Jon Watson – bass, vocals

Technical

- Andy Arthurs – production
- Doug Bennett – engineering
- Steve Nye – engineering
- Alan Winstanley – engineering
- Paul Henry – art direction, design
- George Snow – logo
- Trevor Rogers – photography

== Charts ==
Chart (1978)	Peak position
UK Albums (OCC)	53
