= Black and White (The Stranglers album) =

Studio album by the Stranglers
- Released: 12 May 1978
- Recorded: February–March 1978 ("In the Shadows", July 1977)
- Studio: T.W. Studios, Fulham, London
- Genre: Post-punk; punk rock; new wave; art rock
- Length: 39:50
- Label: United Artists (UK); A&M (US)
- Producer: Martin Rushent

The Stranglers chronology
| No More Heroes (1977) | Black and White (1978) | The Raven (1979) |

Singles from Black and White
- 1. "Nice 'n' Sleazy" Released: April 1978; 2. "Walk On By" Released: July 1978

Black and White is the third studio album by English rock band the Stranglers. It was released on 12 May 1978, through record label United Artists in most of the world and A&M in America.

== Background ==
As with the Stranglers' first two albums, Black and White was produced by Martin Rushent. The album sees the Stranglers adopting a more experimental approach to song structures and time signatures (for example, "Curfew" features 7/4 time).

The band recorded a version of "Sweden" sung in Swedish, called "Sverige", and released it in Sweden. The song was partly inspired by Cornwell's PhD placement at Lund University in the early-1970s. In an anecdote related in the Swedish online magazine Blaskan, it is stated that the song was inspired by a disastrous visit to Sweden during a European tour, when a gig was violently interrupted by a gang of "raggare" (greasers).

The song title "Death and Night and Blood" is taken from a line from Yukio Mishima's novel Confessions of a Mask.

The song "In the Shadows" had previously been released as the B-side to the band's 1977 single "No More Heroes".

A CD version of Black and White can be seen in the music video for "The Official Ironmen's Rally Song" by Guided by Voices.

== Release ==
Black and White was released on 12 May 1978. The album peaked at No. 2 on the UK Albums Chart, spending eighteen weeks on the chart.

The first 75,000 LPs came with a free white vinyl 7" composed of three tracks: "Walk On By" (a cover of the Burt Bacharach and Hal David song written for and originally recorded by Dionne Warwick), "Mean to Me" and "Tits".

The US version of the album, on the A&M label, was pressed on black and white marbled vinyl, but came without the three-track single.

Singles released from the album were "Nice 'n' Sleazy", b/w "Shut Up", and "Walk On By", b/w "Tank" and "Old Codger". "Old Codger" featured a guest vocal from jazz singer George Melly. An edited version of "Walk On By" with "Tank" was also pressed as a double A-side radio-play single.

Most of these tracks were included in the remastered 2001 CD re-issue of the album.

== Critical reception ==
Professional ratings
Review scores
| Source | Rating |
|---|---|
| AllMusic | 2.5/5 stars |
| Encyclopedia of Popular Music | 3/5 stars |
| The Great Rock Discography | 7/10 |
| Record Collector | 5/5 stars |
| Record Mirror | 4/5 stars |
| Sounds | 5/5 stars |

Reviews of the album were positive. NME called the 'A' side "by far the best work they've ever done", Tim Lott of Record Mirror said the album "belies my expectations of The Stranglers as a spent force" and Melody Maker stated the album, while not as good as their debut, showed that the band could "enlarge their ideas and still come up with good tunes".

Some retrospective critics view Black and White in a lesser light to the band's previous albums. AllMusic called it "arguably the weakest" of the Stranglers' first three albums, "yet it still has some absolutely stunning moments." Trouser Press wrote, "Black and White lacks only good songs. Except for "Nice 'n' Sleazy", most of the tracks are merely inferior rehashes of earlier work, making the LP easily forgettable."

Conversely, David Quantick writing for BBC Music said "The Stranglers turned everything round on their third album", stating that the album was both "essential" and "extraordinary" and "displayed clear influences on the work of Gang of Four and Joy Division". Record Collector's Tim Peacock said Black and White "served notice that the Stranglers had already outstripped punk", calling it "stark, compelling and every inch as necessary as contemporaneous envelope-pushers including PiL's First Issue and Wire's Chairs Missing."

== Track listing ==
All tracks are written by the Stranglers (Hugh Cornwell, Jean-Jacques Burnel, Dave Greenfield and Jet Black), except as noted. All CD releases (except the 2018 reissue) have a slightly different running order, with "Hey! (Rise of the Robots)" appearing after "Outside Tokyo" and "In the Shadows" coming after "Threatened".

White side
| No. | Title | Length |
|---|---|---|
| 1. | "Tank" | 2:54 |
| 2. | "Nice 'n' Sleazy" | 3:11 |
| 3. | "Outside Tokyo" | 2:06 |
| 4. | "Mean to Me" (original cassette release only) | 1:55 |
| 5. | "Sweden (All Quiet on the Eastern Front)" | 2:47 |
| 6. | "Hey! (Rise of the Robots)" | 2:13 |
| 7. | "Toiler on the Sea" | 5:23 |

Black side
| No. | Title | Length |
|---|---|---|
| 7. | "Curfew" | 3:10 |
| 8. | "Threatened" | 3:30 |
| 9. | "Do You Wanna" | 2:38 |
| 10. | "Death and Night and Blood (Yukio)" | 2:50 |
| 11. | "In the Shadows" | 4:15 |
| 12. | "Enough Time" | 4:16 |
| Total length: | | 39:50 |

Bonus 7"
| No. | Title | Writer(s) | Length |
|---|---|---|---|
| 1. | "Walk On By" | Burt Bacharach, Hal David | 6:22 |
| 2. | "Mean to Me" | | 1:55 |
| 3. | "Tits" (live at the Hope and Anchor Front Row Festival, London, 22 November 1977) | | 5:25 |
| Total length: | | | 13:42 |

2001 CD reissue bonus tracks
| No. | Title | Writer(s) | Origin | Length |
|---|---|---|---|---|
| 13. | "Mean to Me" | | Cassette album track; Black and White bonus single | 1:55 |
| 14. | "Walk On By" | Bacharach, David | Non-album single, 1978; Black and White bonus single | 6:22 |
| 15. | "Shut Up" | | B-side of "Nice 'n' Sleazy" | 1:07 |
| 16. | "Sverige" | | Non-album single, 1978 | 2:49 |
| 17. | "Old Codger" | | B-side of "Walk On By" | 2:49 |
| 18. | "Tits" (live) | | Black and White bonus single | 5:25 |
| Total length: | | | | 60:13 |

2016 expanded vinyl edition

Self-released by the Stranglers, Black and White received a deluxe vinyl reissue in 2016, limited to 1000 numbered copies. The original 12-track album is coupled with a bonus 7-track album, which includes various associated tracks from the period and the previously unreleased "Social Secs/Wasting Time".

- Side one and two as per original vinyl edition

Side three
| No. | Title | Writer(s) | Origin | Length |
|---|---|---|---|---|
| 1. | "Walk On By" | Bacharach, David | Non-album single | 6:21 |
| 2. | "Mean to Me" | | Cassette album track; Black and White bonus single | 1:55 |
| 3. | "Sverige (Jag Är Insnöad På Östfronten)" | | Non-album single | 2:49 |
| 4. | "Shut Up" | | B-side of "Nice 'n' Sleazy" | 1:06 |

Side four
| No. | Title | Origin | Length |
|---|---|---|---|
| 5. | "Social Secs/Wasting Time" | Previously unreleased | 3:54 |
| 6. | "Old Codger" | B-side of "Walk On By" | 2:53 |
| 7. | "Tits" (live) | Black and White bonus single | 5:25 |
| Total length: | | | 24:23 |

- "Social Secs", later renamed "Wasting Time", is the original version of "Yellowcake UF_{6}", before it was reversed and the vocals taken out, and becoming the B-side of the "Nuclear Device (The Wizard of Aus)" single in 1979. The original riff also resurfaced on "Do the European" from bassist Jean-Jacques Burnel's solo album Euroman Cometh, which he was working on at the time.

2018 CD reissue bonus tracks (Parlophone)

(Associated recordings)
| No. | Title | Origin | Length |
|---|---|---|---|
| 13. | "Shut Up" | B-side of "Nice 'n' Sleazy" | 1:06 |
| 14. | "Walk On By" | Non-album single | 6:21 |
| 15. | "Mean to Me" | Cassette album track; Black and White bonus single | 1:55 |
| 16. | "Tits" (live) | Black and White bonus single | 5:26 |
| 17. | "Old Codger" | B-side of "Walk On By" | 2:51 |
| 18. | "Sverige (Jag Är Insnöad På Östfronten)" | Non-album single | 2:51 |
| 19. | "Walk On By" (single edit) | Promo single | 4:25 |
| Total length: | | | 64:55 |

== Personnel ==
The Stranglers

- Hugh Cornwell – guitar, lead and backing vocals (lead vocals on 1–6, 11, 12 and all bonus tracks except "Shut Up" and "Old Codger")
- Jean-Jacques Burnel – bass guitar, lead and backing vocals (lead vocals on 6, 8, 10 and "Shut Up")
- Dave Greenfield – keyboards (Hammond L100 Organ, Hohner Cembalet electric piano, Minimoog synthesizer), lead and backing vocals (lead vocals on 9)
- Jet Black – drums, percussion

Additional personnel

- Lora Logic – saxophone ("Hey!")
- George Melly – vocals ("Old Codger")
- Lew Lewis – harmonica ("Old Codger")

Technical

- Martin Rushent – production
- Alan Winstanley – engineering; co-production ("Old Codger")
- Kevin Sparrow – sleeve design
- Ruan O'Lochlainn – cover photography
- The Stranglers – co-production ("Old Codger")
- Andy Pearce – remastering (2016 vinyl reissue)
- Pete Mew – remastering (2018 CD reissue)

== Charts ==
| Chart (1978) | Peak position |
|---|---|
| Swedish Albums (Sverigetopplistan) | 35 |
| UK Albums (OCC) | 18 |
| US Billboard Bubbling Under the Top LPs | 210 |
