= New Music Television =

- Presented by: Marc Almond
- Country of origin: United Kingdom

Production
- Running time: 30 minutes

Original release
- Network: ITV and ITV2

New Music Television / New Music TV (NMTV), presented by Marc Almond (of Soft Cell) was a weekly series of 26 half-hour music programmes first aired in the UK at 11:30pm in July 2001 on ITV and ITV2. Each show featured six videos from artists and bands around the world together with an interview with a well known or up-and-coming artist/band.

The series was formatted to portray a retro, fun and quirky style. It went on to sell around the world into 48 countries via Southern Star distribution and was responsible for helping to break 24 then unknown artists or bands into the UK top 20. e.g. The White Stripes, Feeder, The Hives and P.J. Harvey. The NMTV executive and series producer was Stephen Benham (formally known as Bo Benham of The Pleasers) the series was directed by Enrico Lando.
