= Nice 'n' Sleazy =

Single by The Stranglers

from the album Black and White
- B-side: "Shut Up"
- Released: 21 April 1978
- Genre: Progressive punk; reggae
- Length: 3:11
- Label: United Artists
- Songwriters: Hugh Cornwell, Jean Jacques Burnel, Dave Greenfield, Jet Black
- Producer: Martin Rushent

The Stranglers singles chronology
"5 Minutes" (1978)	"Nice 'n' Sleazy" (1978)	"Walk On By" (1978)

"Nice 'n' Sleazy" is a single by The Stranglers from the 'white' side of their 1978 album, Black and White. It reached number 18 in the UK Singles Chart. The single's cover pictured a victim of the Boston Strangler.

Strippers embellished the song during the band's headline set at Battersea Park on 16 September 1978. "The Stranglers booked some strippers to up the show's visual aspect," recalled photographer Barry Plummer. "But some of the lads in the audience got a bit carried away and also stripped completely naked. Eventually the police were called and took down all of the young ladies' particulars."

== Cultural references ==
A punk festival named after the song is held annually in Morecambe, Lancashire.

A bar located on Glasgow's Sauchiehall Street is named after the song. It was first opened in 1991.

== Charts ==
Chart (1978)	Peak position
UK Singles (OCC)	18
