= No More Heroes (album) =

Studio album by the Stranglers
- Released: 23 September 1977
- Recorded: January–February 1977, June–July 1977
- Studio: T.W. (Fulham)
- Genre: Punk rock; new wave; art punk
- Length: 38:01
- Label: United Artists (UK); A&M (US)
- Producer: Martin Rushent

The Stranglers chronology
Rattus Norvegicus (1977)	No More Heroes (1977)	Black and White (1978)

Singles from No More Heroes
- 1. "Something Better Change" Released: 22 July 1977; 2. "No More Heroes" Released: 16 September 1977

No More Heroes is the second album by the English rock band the Stranglers. It was released on 23 September 1977, through record label United Artists in most of the world and A&M in the United States, five months after their debut album, Rattus Norvegicus. It reached number 2 in the UK Album Charts and was certified gold there.

In 2000 it was voted number 427 in Colin Larkin's All Time Top 1000 Albums.

== Background ==
No More Heroes was produced by Martin Rushent. The album consists of new material except for four songs left over from the Rattus Norvegicus sessions ("Something Better Change", "Bitching", "Peasant in the Big Shitty" and "School Mam"). Cornwell said "It helped having songs that were hanging over from Rattus, they felt just as good. Add a few more and then suddenly, hey presto, you've got the second album." The opening track "I Feel Like a Wog" was controversial for its reference to golliwogs which Cornwell used "for shock effect, but it was to put across a feeling", and despite lots of people "misunderstanding it" he said "a couple of black guys came back after one show and said: 'We get it.' That made me feel good." He admitted that the band deliberately tried "to wind people up", particularly with the track "Bring on the Nubiles", which is known for its sexual nature. He said the band found that "it was entertaining [...], fun and really harmless. People might say: 'How can you say that's harmless?' But we weren't trying to upset people. We were in the sweet shop and we were helping ourselves. We'd realised that we could upset people, so let's go to town, let's really upset them." He also felt that they "definitely couldn't get away with that now", saying: "We got away with murder."

The album cover features a photo of a wreath placed on a coffin with the tails of several rats (the Stranglers' trademark). The brass plaque on the album cover was engraved by Steven Stapleton, later of Nurse with Wound. This cover was rushed as it was a last-minute choice; allegedly, the original sleeve depicted Jean-Jacques Burnel alone on the tomb of Leon Trotsky, and was abandoned owing to the other members being dissatisfied that it did not feature the whole band.

Two singles were released from the album: the title track, and a double A-side of "Something Better Change" and the non-album track "Straighten Out".

== Critical reception ==
Professional ratings
Review scores
Source	Rating
AllMusic	4.5/5 stars
The Encyclopedia of Popular Music	4/5 stars
The Great Rock Discography	7/10
Record Collector	3/5 stars
The Rolling Stone Album Guide	2/5 stars

Contemporary reception was largely positive, with many finding it to be an improvement over their debut.

The Oakland Tribune likened the band to "Capt. Beefheart backed by the Ramones." The Guardian noted that "a good organ sound and distinctive vocal tricks [keep] off the encroaching monotony."Trouser Press wrote that No More Heroes "continues in the same vein [as Rattus Norvegicus], but drops whatever hint of restraint may have been in force the first time around. Rude words and adult themes abound, with no punches pulled, from the blatant sexism of "Bring on the Nubiles" to the sarcastic attack on racism ("I Feel Like a Wog") to the suicide of a friend ("Dagenham Dave"). Despite the increased virulence, the music is even better than on the debut, introducing pop stylings that would later become a more common aspect of the Stranglers' character," finishing the review with "No More Heroes is easily [the Stranglers'] best album."

John Dougan of AllMusic called No More Heroes "faster, nastier and better [than Rattus Norvegicus]. "At this point the Stranglers were on top of their game, and the ferocity and anger that suffuses this record would never be repeated." Record Collector praised the album, calling" the adrenalised anti-racist message of I Feel Like A Wog and its timeless titular song" the highlights, and said the album had an "essential status" but found it to be "hobbled by the puerile Bring On The Nubiles and Cornwell's tedious School Mam".

== In popular culture ==
The popular hack and slash video game series No More Heroes by Grasshopper Manufacture got its name from the album.

== Track listing ==
All tracks are written by the Stranglers (Hugh Cornwell, Jean-Jacques Burnel, Dave Greenfield, Jet Black).

Side A
No.	Title	Lead vocals	Length
1.	"I Feel Like a Wog"	Hugh Cornwell	3:16
2.	"Bitching"	Jean-Jacques Burnel	4:25
3.	"Dead Ringer"	Dave Greenfield	2:46
4.	"Dagenham Dave"	Burnel	3:18
5.	"Bring on the Nubiles"	Cornwell	2:15
6.	"Something Better Change"	Burnel	3:35

Side B
No.	Title	Lead vocals	Length
7.	"No More Heroes"	Cornwell	3:27
8.	"Peasant in the Big Shitty"	Greenfield	3:25
9.	"Burning Up Time"	Burnel	2:25
10.	"English Towns"	Cornwell	2:13
11.	"School Mam"	Cornwell	6:52
Total length:			38:01

1987 CD reissue bonus track (EMI)

No.	Title	Lead vocals	Length
12.	"5 Minutes" (Non-album single, 1978)	Burnel	3:18
Total length:			41:19

1996 CD reissue bonus disc (EMI)

- Disc one as per original album

Disc two
No.	Title	Lead vocals	Length
1.	"Straighten Out" (Double A-side with "Something Better Change")	Cornwell	2:46
2.	"5 Minutes"		3:18
3.	"Rok It to the Moon" (B-side to "5 Minutes")	Cornwell	2:47
Total length:			8:51

2001 CD reissue bonus tracks (EMI)
No.	Title	Length
12.	"Straighten Out"	2:46
13.	"5 Minutes"	3:18
14.	"Rok It to the Moon"	2:47
Total length:		47:09

2018 CD reissue bonus tracks (Parlophone)

(Associated recordings)
No.	Title	Lead vocals	Length
12.	"Straighten Out"		2:46
13.	"In the Shadows" (B-side to "No More Heroes")	Cornwell	4:37
14.	"5 Minutes"		3:17
15.	"Rok It to the Moon"		2:47
16.	"No More Heroes" (Promo single edit)		2:56
Total length:			54:52

== Charts and certifications ==
=== Weekly charts ===
Chart	Peak Position	Certifications (sales thresholds)
UK Albums Chart	2	UK: Gold
Australian Charts	79	UK: Gold
Dutch Charts	20	UK: Gold

=== Year-end charts ===
Chart (1977)	Position
UK Albums (OCC)	32

=== Singles ===
Single	Chart	Peak Position
"Something Better Change"	UK singles chart	9
"Something Better Change"	Irish Charts	29
"No More Heroes"	UK singles chart	8
"No More Heroes"	Dutch Charts	25

== Personnel ==
The Stranglers

- Hugh Cornwell – guitars, lead and backing vocals
- Jean-Jacques Burnel – bass guitar, lead and backing vocals
- Dave Greenfield – keyboards (Hammond L100 Organ, Hohner Cembalet electric piano, Minimoog synthesizer), lead and backing vocals
- Jet Black – drums, percussion

Technical personnel

- Martin Rushent – production
- Alan Winstanley – engineering
- Nigel Brooke-Harte – mixing, engineering assistance
- Doug Bennett – mixing
- JONZ (John Dent) – mastering
- Paul Henry – sleeve design, art direction
- Trevor Rogers – sleeve photography
- Eamonn O'Keefe – sleeve photography solarisation
- The Red Room – artwork design (2001 reissue)
