= Hard Corps (English band) =

British synthpop band

- Origin: London, England
- Genre: Synthpop
- Years active: 1984–1990
- Labels: Survival; Polydor; Sonoscope; Rhythm King
- Past members: Hugh Ashton; Robert Doran; Clive Pierce; Regine Fetet

Hard Corps were a 1980s synthpop band from Brixton, London.

== History ==
Hugh Ashton, Robert Doran and Clive Pierce were introduced to chanteuse Regine Fetet, who, having never sung before had an enigmatic, fragile human voice which mated perfectly with the sound the three British sound engineers were creating. Hard Corps were an electronic band that pioneered electronic music in the 1980s and released their first single in 1984 Dirty/Respirer on Survival Records, with Respirer also being released that year on The Art of Survival compilation EP along with bands such as Tik and Tok, Eddie and Sunshine and Richard Bone. A later re-recording in 1985 of Respirer was produced by Mute Records founder and electronic music production supremo Daniel Miller.

In June 1985 Regine and the band were the main act on the re launch of The Fridge in Brixton at the new larger premises on Town Hall Parade, SW2, the band supported The Cure in the UK and Europe and in 1988 supported Depeche Mode in the UK. They were on the cusp of making a real impact and hoped to support Depeche Mode when they returned to the USA, but according to an interview by Rob Doran for The Electricity Club: "However, we were not invited possibly due to British and American Musician Union politics on support bands and reciprocal agreements, but I don’t think there was any chance with Regine’s onstage controversies anyway!"

By the time the band released their first album in 1990 (produced by Martin Rushent), they had already split up. Doran went on to write music for TV, radio, commercials and video with the singer from Perfect Strangers, Rod Syers. Ashton carried on with Regine for a while doing PAs and using the Hard Corps' name before becoming The Sun Kings with former Naked Lunch member Paul ‘Driver’ Davies. Clive Pierce continued writing and producing electronic music.

The band is noteworthy for Regine's provocative performances, which often involved her removing her top on stage; an apocryphal story suggests that this may have been the reason for the band not supporting Depeche Mode in the USA. Regine Fetet died of cancer in 2003. A number of previously unreleased tracks have been made available on LPs compiled by Minimal Wave Records.

Hugh Ashton died from cancer on 19 January 2024.

== Members ==
- Hugh Ashton - synth
- Rob Doran - synth
- Clive Pierce - synth
- Regine Fetet - vocals

== Discography ==
=== Albums ===
- 1990: Metal + Flesh (Concrete Productions/Pinpoint Records)
- 2012: Clean Tables Have to Be Burnt (Minimal Wave)
- 2013: Rarities (Minimal Wave)

=== Singles ===
- 1984: "Dirty" b/w "Respirer" (Survival Records)
- 1985: "Je Suis Passée" (Immaculate Records) - in 1985, "Je Suis Passée" was also edited as a 12" maxi (Extended French Version, Club Dub Mix) in Canada, UK, France and Germany on Immaculate, Polydor and on Metronome
- 1985: "To Breathe" (Sonoscope/Polydor)
- 1985: Jesse Rae / Hard Corps – "Over the Sea" / "Je Suis Passée" (split single, WEA/Polydor)
- 1987: "Porte Bonheur" (Mute Sonet France)
- 1987: "Lucky Charm" (Sonoscope/Rhythm King Records)

=== Compilation appearances ===
- 1984: "Respirer" on The Art of Survival

== Equipment list ==
The following are equipment used by Hard Corps on their recordings:

- Roland System 100m
- Roland MC4 micro composer
- Roland MC500 micro composer
- Roland TR 808
- Roland Chorus Echo
- Casio CZ101
- Roland Jupiter 6
- Roland Juno 60
- Casio VL tone
- EMU SP12
- Roland SVC 350 Vocoder
- Roland SDE - 2000
- Tascam 85-16B 16 track tape machine
- Roland D110
- Big Muff Distortion Pedal
- Akai S 900
- Akai S 950
- Aphex Aural Exciter
- Revox 2 track
- Roland SBF - 325 Flanger
- Simmons Suitcase Pads
- Drumulator Pads
- Roland Octapads
