= Hanging Around (The Stranglers song) =

1977 song by the Stranglers

Song by the Stranglers

from the album Rattus Norvegicus
- Released: 15 April 1977
- Recorded: 1977
- Studio: T.W. Studios, Fulham
- Genre: Punk rock
- Length: 4:25
- Label: United Artists
- Songwriters: Hugh Cornwell; Jean-Jacques Burnel; Dave Greenfield; Jet Black
- Producer: Martin Rushent

"Hanging Around" is a song by English rock band the Stranglers, released on their 1977 debut album Rattus Norvegicus. The song was written by the band's guitarist, Hugh Cornwell, and is notable for its driving bassline and its lyrics about urban alienation.

== Composition and release ==
The song grew out of a bass line by Jean-Jacques Burnel to which Hugh Cornwell added lyrics. The lyrics were inspired by people who used to 'hang around' the London clubs, particularly the Nashville, where the band used to perform. The first verse focuses on "a woman in red who was always there getting drunk and passing out, which [according to Cornwell] used to make us laugh". The second verse makes reference to Earl's Court Road near the Nashville where drug hustlers hung about. The third verse refers to "a friend of ours called Garry Coward-Williams, who was always smiling, and a friend of his we called Duncan Doughnuts, who was 20 going on 40. I could never believe how old he looked. His whole manner and appearance was of a middle-aged man". For the fourth verse, Cornwell had run out of ideas, so Burnel provided the lyrics for it, which refer to the Coleherne, a gay pub that he used to frequent.

The chorus mentions Jesus Christ, about which Cornwell has said:

"The title of the song reminded me of a joke I'd heard, which I thought was funny. What a great way to spend Easter, hanging around on a cross. It's very flippant. I find that references to God and Christ are very emotive. For a long period of time I loved hanging around churches. There's something fascinating about the power of religious belief. I'm not necessarily a very religious person, but I'm fascinated by the regalia and everything connected with it. I love using references to religion in the creative process because it's so emotive and controversial. You get people who strongly believe and equally strident non-believers".

There was a possibility that "Hanging Around" could have been released as the band's third single. However, their second album, No More Heroes, was released five months after Rattus Norvegicus in September 1977 and "it wouldn't have made marketing sense to release a single from one album, when a new album was coming out immediately afterwards". Instead, "Something Better Change" was released in July 1977 as their third single and first from No More Heroes.

== Personnel ==
- Hugh Cornwell – lead vocals, lead and rhythm guitar
- Jean-Jacques Burnel – backing vocals, bass guitar
- Dave Greenfield – Hammond organ, Hohner electric piano
- Jet Black – drums

== Hazel O'Connor version ==
"Hanging Around"

Single by Hazel O'Connor

from the album Cover Plus
- Released: September 1981
- Recorded: 1981
- Studio: Good Earth Studios, London
- Genre: New wave
- Length: 4:11 (album version; 3:05 (single version)
- Label: Albion
- Songwriters: Hugh Cornwell; Jean-Jacques Burnel; Dave Greenfield; Jet Black
- Producer: Tony Visconti

Hazel O'Connor singles chronology
"(Cover Plus) We're All Grown Up" (1981)	"Hanging Around" (1981)	"Calls the Tune" (1982)

In September 1981, British singer Hazel O'Connor released a cover of the song as a single from her second studio album Cover Plus. It peaked at number 45 on the UK Singles Chart.

=== Reception ===
Reviewing for Smash Hits, Ian Birch wrote "Hazel always treats her songs like showbiz productions. You might almost see the stage set here (city streets and distant neon). The orchestra bound into a fat rhythm. There's some sweaty sax for atmosphere and some synthesiser for modernity. Hazel performs a show-stopper while a male chorus sellotape on back-up vocals". When reviewing Cover Plus for Record Mirror, Simon Tebbutt described "Hanging Around" as "a curiously watered down version with little of the raunch of the original".

=== Track listings ===
7" (UK)

1. "Hanging Around" – 3:05
2. "Hold On" – 4:26
3. "Not for You" (German Version) – 2:44

7" (Europe & Australia)

1. "Hanging Around" – 3:05
2. "Hold On" – 4:26

=== Personnel ===
- Hazel O'Connor – vocals
- Neil O'Connor – guitar, backing vocals
- Andy 'Roots' Qunta – keyboards, backing vocals
- Steve Kinch – bass guitar, backing vocals
- Wesley Magoogan – saxophone, lyricon, backing vocals
- Eddie Case – drums, backing vocals

=== Charts ===
Chart (1981)	Peak position
Ireland (IRMA)	28
UK Singles (OCC)	45
UK Indie (MRIB)	10

== Ghost version ==
In 2023, Swedish rock band Ghost released a cover of the song on their EP Phantomime.
