= Rattus Norvegicus (album) =

1977 album by The Stranglers

Studio album by the Stranglers
- Released: 15 April 1977
- Recorded: January–February 1977
- Studio: T.W. Studios (Fulham); Mixed at Olympic Studios, Barnes, London
- Genre: Punk rock; new wave; pub rock; art punk
- Length: 40:05
- Label: United Artists (UK); A&M (US)
- Producer: Martin Rushent

The Stranglers chronology
Rattus Norvegicus (1977)	No More Heroes (1977)

Singles from Rattus Norvegicus
- 1. "(Get A) Grip (On Yourself)" Released: 28 January 1977; 2. "Peaches" Released: 21 May 1977; 3. "Sometimes" Released: October 1977 (Japan)

Rattus Norvegicus (also known as The Stranglers IV) is the debut studio album by English rock band the Stranglers, released on 15 April 1977.

It was one of the highest-selling albums of the punk era in Britain, eventually achieving platinum record sales. Two of its tracks, "Peaches" and "(Get A) Grip (On Yourself)", were released as 7-inch singles in the UK.

== Background ==
The album was originally going to be titled Dead on Arrival but it was changed at the last minute. The Stranglers IV prefix was a deliberate attempt by the band to cause confusion. The released title is the taxonomic name for the brown rat. The album was produced in one week by Martin Rushent and was a snapshot of the band's live set at the time.

The first 10,000 copies of the original vinyl release included a free 7-inch single, containing "Peasant in the Big Shitty" (live) and "Choosey Susie". The album launch party was held in the Water Rat pub on the King's Road in World's End, Chelsea.

Remastered versions of the album with bonus tracks were reissued on CD in 1996, 2001 and 2018.

== Lyrics ==
According to the book The Stranglers-Song by Song, "Sometimes" describes a violent argument with a girlfriend. The same girlfriend is the subject of "Strange Little Girl" which was written earlier by Cornwell and Hans Wärmling. "Goodbye Toulouse" describes the destruction of Toulouse predicted by Nostradamus.

"London Lady" is loosely based on a contemporary female journalist, and "Hanging Around" describes the characters found in the London pubs where the band performed. In 1981, it was covered by Hazel O'Connor on her third album, Cover Plus, and released as a single.

The lyrics of "Peaches" take the form of an internal monologue by a man ogling girls on the beach. The song was notably featured in the opening scene of Jonathan Glazer's 2000 film Sexy Beast.

"(Get a) Grip (On Yourself)" is based on the band's life in their squat in Chiddingfold, Surrey. It features Eric Clarke, a Welsh coal miner friend of manager Dai Davies, on saxophone. "Ugly" mentions Percy Bysshe Shelley's poem Ozymandias.

"Down in the Sewer" has four sections: "Falling", "Down in the Sewer", "Trying to Get Out Again", and "Rat's Rally". The 'sewer' refers to London. The song references an episode of the 1975 post-apocalyptic BBC TV drama Survivors titled "Lights of London", where the protagonists leave the safety of a farming community to head for the city, which they find can only be entered through a rat-infested sewer.

== Reception and legacy ==
Professional ratings
Review scores
Source	Rating
AllMusic	4/5 stars
Encyclopedia of Popular Music	5/5 stars
The Great Rock Discography	8/10
Mojo	4/5 stars
Record Collector	4/5 stars
Record Mirror	5/5 stars
Sounds	4/5 stars
The Village Voice	C

Rattus Norvegicus was ranked at No. 10 among the top albums of the year for 1977 by NME, with "Peaches" ranked at No. 18 among the year's top tracks.

Chas de Whalley of Sounds observed "I THINK this album will surprise a lot of people. After all (by chance, coincidence and a spot of media manipulation, no less) the Stranglers have long been branded as punks. New wavers to be Daily Mirrored in the same print as the Pistols and the Damned." Robert Christgau of The Village Voice gave the album a C ranking, saying " These guys combine the sensitivity and erudition of ? and the Mysterians with the street smarts of the Doors and detest the act of love with a humorless intensity worthy of Anthony Comstock." dismissing it as "Too dumb."

Robert Smith of the Cure cited Rattus Norvegicus as one of his five favourite albums in a 1985 interview.

In 2000, Rattus Norvegicus was voted number 766 in Colin Larkin's All Time Top 1000 Albums. It was also included in Robert Dimery's 1001 Albums You Must Hear Before You Die. NME later ranked it at No. 196 on its 2014 list of the 500 greatest albums of all time.

David Cleary of AllMusic described most of the songs as "hardcore pop to a tee", but also noted its diversity, with tracks such as "Princess of the Streets", which he called "a slow-tempo selection with blueslike echoes" and found "London Lady" to be " almost a true punk song -- or at least as close as the band gets to one." Record Collector said it "ranks highly among the Class Of ’77’s premier platters. Sometimes, Ugly and the ultra-lairy Peaches quickly established their thug-rock credentials, though the imperiously bluesy Princess Of The Streets and the exhilarating, suite-like finale, Down In The Sewer, defiantly paraded Cornwell and company’s virtuosity despite punk’s prevailing demands to dumb things down."

== Track listing ==
All tracks are written by the Stranglers (Hugh Cornwell, Jean-Jacques Burnel, Dave Greenfield, Jet Black).

Side A
No.	Title	Lead vocals	Length
1.	"Sometimes"	Hugh Cornwell	4:56
2.	"Goodbye Toulouse"	Cornwell	3:12
3.	"London Lady"	Jean-Jacques Burnel	2:25
4.	"Princess of the Streets"	Burnel	4:34
5.	"Hanging Around"	Cornwell	4:25

Side B
No.	Title	Lead vocals	Length
6.	"Peaches"	Cornwell	4:03
7.	"(Get A) Grip (On Yourself)"	Cornwell	3:55
8.	"Ugly"	Burnel	4:03
9.	"Down in the Sewer": a. "Falling"; b. "Down in the Sewer"; c. "Trying to Get Out Again"; d. "Rats Rally"	Cornwell	7:30
Total length:			40:05

Free single

No.	Title	Lead vocals	Length
1.	"Peasant in the Big Shitty" (live^{a})	Dave Greenfield	3:42
2.	"Choosey Susie"	Burnel	3:14
Total length:			6:56

1996 CD reissue bonus disc (EMI)

- Disc one as per original album

Disc two
No.	Title	Lead vocals	Length
1.	"Choosey Susie"		3:14
2.	"Go Buddy Go" (B-side to "Peaches")	Burnel	3:58
3.	"Peasant in the Big Shitty" (live)		3:42
Total length:			10:54

2001 CD bonus tracks

No.	Title	Length
10.	"Choosey Susie"	3:14
11.	"Go Buddy Go"	3:58
12.	"Peasant in the Big Shitty" (live)	3:42
Total length:		50:59

2018 CD reissue bonus tracks (Parlophone)

(Associated recordings)
No.	Title	Length
10.	"Choosey Susie"	3:13
11.	"Peasant in the Big Shitty" (live)	3:39
12.	"Go Buddy Go"	3:58
13.	"Peaches" (Airplay version)	4:07
14.	"Grip '89 (Get A) Grip (On Yourself)" (1989 single remix)	4:01
15.	"Grip '89" (12" Grippin' Stuff Mix)	5:38
Total length:		64:42

- ^a Live at The Nashville pub in West Kensington, 10 December 1976

== Charts and certifications ==
=== Weekly charts ===
Chart	Peak Position	Certifications (sales thresholds)
UK Albums Chart	4	UK: Platinum
Australian Charts	82	UK: Platinum

=== Year-end charts ===
Chart (1977)	Position
UK Albums (OCC)	21

=== Singles ===
Single	Chart	Peak Position	Certifications (sales thresholds)
"(Get a) Grip (On Yourself)"	UK Singles Chart	44	
"(Get a) Grip (On Yourself)"	New Zealand Chart	35	
"Peaches"	UK Singles Chart	8	UK: Silver
"Peaches"	Australian Chart	54	UK: Silver

== Personnel ==
Credits adapted from the album liner notes.

The Stranglers

- Hugh Cornwell – guitars, lead and backing vocals
- Jean-Jacques Burnel – bass guitar, lead and backing vocals
- Dave Greenfield – keyboards (Hammond L100 Organ, Hohner Cembalet electric piano, Minimoog synthesizer), backing and lead vocals
- Jet Black – drums, percussion

Additional musicians

- Eric Clarke – tenor saxophone ("(Get A) Grip (On Yourself)")

Technical

- Martin Rushent – production
- Alan Winstanley – engineering
- Doug Bennett – mixing engineering
- Benny King – mixing engineering assistance
- Vic Maile (with the Island Mobile) – engineering ("Peasant in the Big Shitty")
- Barry Cooder – remixing ("Grip '89")
- Taff B. Dylan – remixing ("Grip '89")
- Trevor Rogers – sleeve photography
- Paul Henry – sleeve design, art direction
