= Peaches (The Stranglers song) =

1977 single by the Stranglers

Single by the Stranglers

from the album Rattus Norvegicus
- A-side: "Go Buddy Go"
- Released: 6 May 1977
- Studio: T.W. Studios, Fulham
- Genre: Punk rock; reggae
- Length: 4:03
- Label: United Artists
- Songwriters: Jean-Jacques Burnel; Hugh Cornwell; Dave Greenfield; Jet Black
- Producer: Martin Rushent

The Stranglers singles chronology
"(Get A) Grip (On Yourself)" / "London Lady" (1977)	"Peaches" / "Go Buddy Go" (1977)	"Something Better Change" / "Straighten Out" (1977)

2014 reissue vinyl alternative sleeve

Official audio
- "Peaches" (1996 Remaster) on YouTube

Official audio
- "Go Buddy Go" (1996 Remaster) on YouTube

"Peaches" is a song by the English rock band the Stranglers, released in 1977 as the second single from their debut album Rattus Norvegicus. Notable for its distinctive bassline, the track peaked at No. 8 in the UK Singles Chart.

== Lyrics and response ==
The lyrics to "Peaches" featured coarse sexual language and innuendo to a degree that was unusual for the time. The song's narrator is girl-watching on a crowded beach one hot summer day. It is never made clear if his lascivious thoughts (such as "there goes a girl and a half") are an interior monologue, comments to his companions, or come-on lines to the attractive women in question. The critic Tom Maginnis wrote that Hugh Cornwell sings with "a lecherous sneer...spill[ing] into macho parody or even censor-baiting territory".

The single was a double A-side with "Go Buddy Go". The latter was played on UK radio at the time and also was performed on the band's first BBC TV Top of the Pops appearance, because the sexual nature of the lyrics of "Peaches" caused the BBC to censor it. Still, "Peaches" was ranked at No. 18 among the top "Tracks of the Year" for 1977 by NME, and it reached No. 8 in the UK Singles Chart. The radio cut was re-recorded with less explicit lyrics: "clitoris" was replaced with "bikini", "oh shit" with "oh no" and "what a bummer" with "what a summer". The catalogue number of the radio version was FREE 4.

== Legacy ==
In a 2022 feature, Guitar World named "Peaches" as having the fourth-best bassline of all time.

"Peaches" plays over the opening credits of Jonathan Glazer's 2000 film Sexy Beast.

An edited version of "Peaches", minus the lyrics, was used as the closing theme tune to many of the TV chef Keith Floyd's Floyd on... television shows and during a party scene in the 1997 film Metroland. The song is also on the soundtrack of the video game Driver: Parallel Lines (2006). It was used by Adidas in advertising in the Netherlands in 2002.

The song is heard in episode nine of series two of the TV series Gotham, the opening sequence of a 2006 Hollyoaks episode, and the 2011 film Killer Elite.

Dub Pistols covered the song on their 2007 album, Speakers and Tweeters, with Rodney P on guest MC vocals and Terry Hall of the Specials singing the chorus.

The song is used in episode 16 (2011) of the BBC series Being Human, when the hungry "teenage" vampire Adam stalks three teenage girls into a game arcade.

"Peaches" is also featured in episode 5 of the first series of the sitcom White Gold (2017).

The song was featured twice in the Back to Mine series of "after hours grooving" DJ mix albums, with Liam Howlett and Audio Bullys both including it. Simon Franks of the latter referred to it as "raw UK old school".

The single was re-issued, with "Go Buddy Go", on green vinyl and with a new sleeve for Record Store Day in 2014.

== Personnel ==
The Stranglers

- Hugh Cornwell – lead vocals, electric guitar
- Jet Black – drums
- Jean-Jacques Burnel – bass guitar, backing vocals
- Dave Greenfield – organ, synthesizer, backing vocals

== Charts ==
Chart (1977)	Peak position
Australia (Kent Music Report)	54
UK Singles (Official Charts)	8
