= No More Heroes (song) =

Single by the Stranglers

from the album No More Heroes
- B-side: "In the Shadows"
- Released: September 1977 (UK)
- Studio: T.W. Studios (Fulham)
- Genre: Punk rock; new wave
- Length: 3:29
- Label: United Artists
- Songwriters: Hugh Cornwell; Jean-Jacques Burnel; Jet Black
- Producer: Martin Rushent

The Stranglers singles chronology
"Something Better Change" (1977)	"No More Heroes" (1977)	"Sometimes" (1977)

Music video
- "No More Heroes" on YouTube

"No More Heroes" is a song by the English rock band the Stranglers, released in September 1977 as the second single from the band's second album No More Heroes. It is one of the group's most successful singles, having peaked at No. 8 in the UK Singles Chart, their third top-ten hit.

The video game series No More Heroes took its name from the Stranglers' song and album.

== Background ==
The song's lyrics refer to several historical figures, starting with the Russian Marxist revolutionary Leon Trotsky who "got an ice pick / that made his ears burn". The second verse reels off "dear old Lenny", that is, the stand-up comedian Lenny Bruce; "the Great Elmyra", identified by Cornwell as painter and art forger Elmyr de Hory; and the fictional character Sancho Panza from the novel Don Quixote. The playwright William Shakespeare and the Roman emperor Nero complete the list.

At the time of the single's release, the B-side "In the Shadows" was a non-album track; however, it appeared on the Stranglers' next studio album, Black and White (1978).

The band's publishers threatened legal action against Elastica in 1995, arguing that their single "Waking Up" borrowed elements of "No More Heroes". Elastica eventually settled out of court.

A cover version of the song by Violent Femmes featured in the movie Mystery Men (1999), and was also heard in two episodes of the BBC television series Ashes to Ashes: episode 1 of Series 1 and episode 4 of Series 3. It was included in the soundtrack to Series 1.

The song was featured on the closing credits of TV series Zapped, Season 2, Episode 6. Former Stranglers member and song co-writer Hugh Cornwell released an acoustic version of the song on his ninth solo studio album Monster (2018), along with acoustic versions of nine other Stranglers songs. It also featured in Episode 1 of Season 3 of The Umbrella Academy.

The video game series No More Heroes is named after this song and the album.

== Charts ==
Chart (1977)	Peak position
Netherlands (Dutch Top 40)	29
Netherlands (Single Top 100)	25
UK Singles (Official Charts)	8
