= Hope and Anchor, Islington =

Coordinates: 51.5432°N 0.1034°W

Hope and Anchor
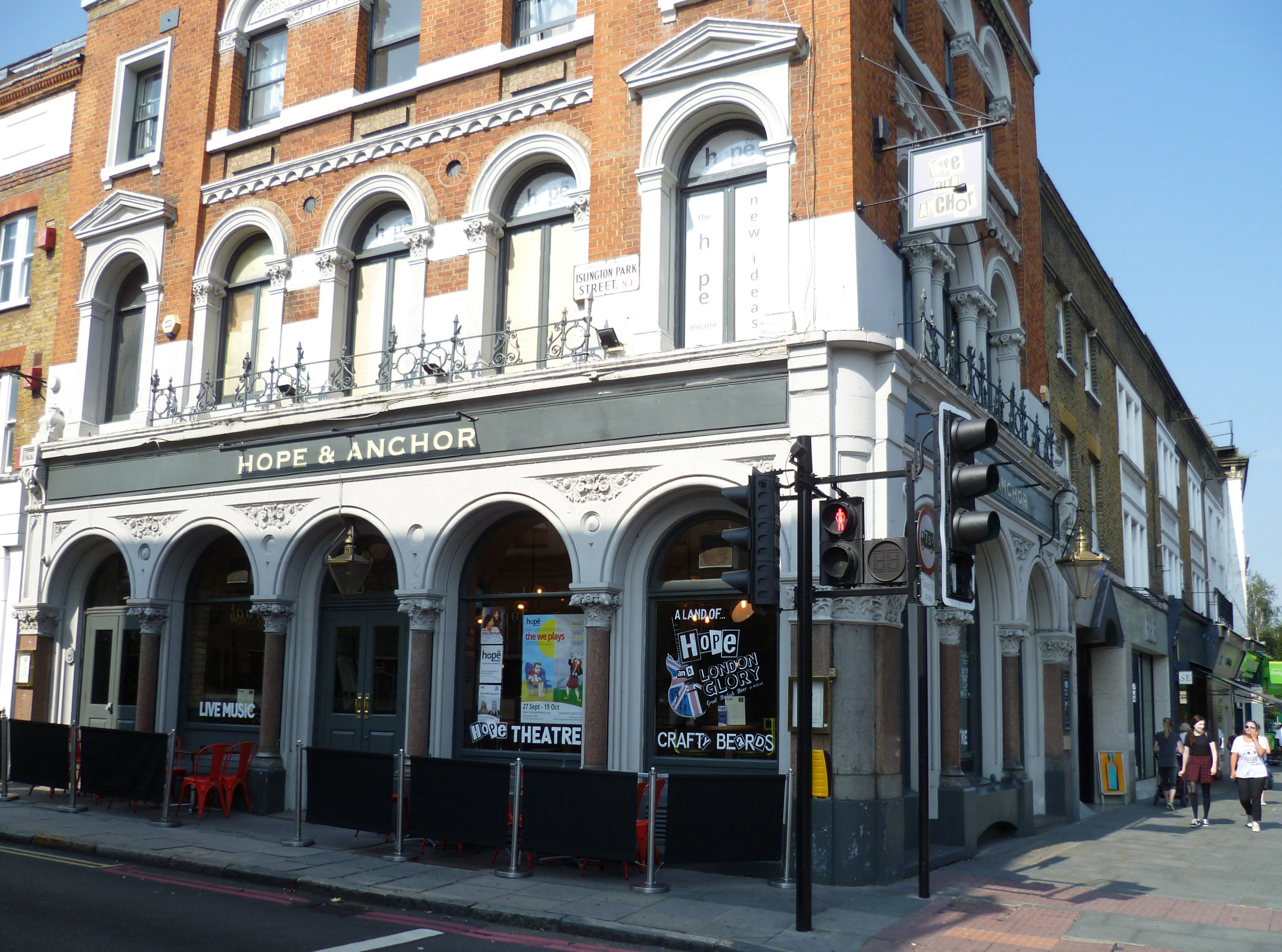
- Hope and Anchor, Islington. (October 2005)
- Interactive map of the Hope and Anchor area

General information
- Type: Pub
- Location: Islington, London, England
- Completed: 1928 (current form)

Hope and Anchor is a pub and upstairs theatre (The Hope Theatre) on Upper Street, in the London Borough of Islington which first opened its doors in 1880. During the mid-1970s it was one of the first pubs to embrace the emergent, but brief, phenomenon of pub rock. With the decline of this movement, the pub went on to become a leading venue in the punk rock movement. Hope and Anchor is still an operational pub and live music venue today, owned and operated by the Greene King brewing company. It is a Grade II listed building.

== History ==
When The Tally Ho pub in Kentish Town decided to switch from showcasing rock music to Irish music, Hope and Anchor became the venue to go to in north London. The nights grew and developed under the stewardship of managers Fred Grainger and Dave Robinson, both of whom later moved on to other things (Grainger to open a nightclub in Brighton, Robinson to co-found independent record label Stiff Records with Jake Riviera).

In January 1976, the venue was acquired by Albion Management and Agency, who installed John Eichler as the landlord. In the light of numerous threats of closure, Eichler organised various benefits in order to keep the pub open, with well-established bands returning to the pub to perform for only expenses. Ian Grant of Albion Management and Agency narrowed down a long list to a final twenty two bands – all of which had played at the pub previously.

'The Front Row Festival', which took place between Tuesday 22 November and Thursday 15 December 1977, featured numerous pub rock, punk, and new wave groups. The recordings were issued as an eponymous live double album, which reached No. 28 in the UK Albums Chart.

The Stranglers recorded their album Live at the Hope and Anchor at the pub, also in 1977. The venue was the location for The Damned's "New Rose" video the previous year and later for Madness' "One Step Beyond" video. The demo of "Between You and Me" from the first Graham Parker album, Howlin' Wind, was recorded in the basement. The pub was also featured in the 1980 film, Breaking Glass.The Fierce and the Dead recorded their Live At The Hope & Anchor EP there in 2020.
