= Martin Rushent =

English record producer (1948–2011)

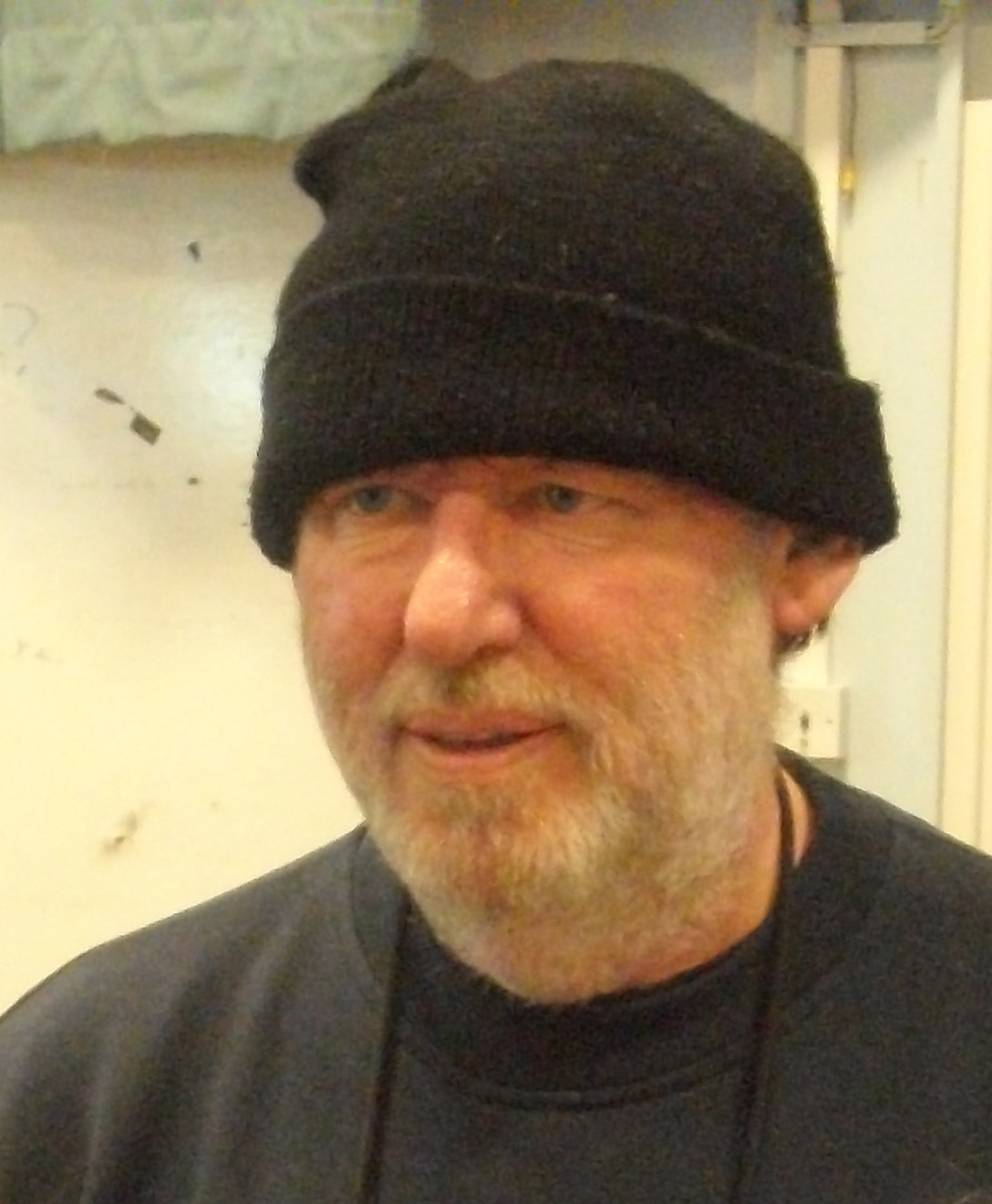
- Rushent in February 2011

Background information
- Born: Martin Charles Rushent; 11 July 1948; Enfield, Middlesex, England
- Origin: London, England
- Died: 4 June 2011 (aged 62) Upper Basildon, Berkshire, England
- Genres: Punk rock; synth-pop; new wave; electro; progressive rock
- Occupations: Record producer; arranger
- Instruments: Synthesizer; vocals
- Years active: 1968–2011
- Labels: EMI; Virgin
- Website: Martin Rushent Myspace

Martin Charles Rushent (11 July 1948 – 4 June 2011) was an English record producer, best known for his work with the Human League, the Stranglers and Buzzcocks.

== Early life ==
Rushent was born on 11 July 1948 in Enfield, Middlesex. His father was a car salesman. Rushent attended Minchenden Grammar School in Southgate, Middlesex.

Rushent left school and started working at a local chemical factory and then with his father, before embarking on his music career in the early 1970s as a studio engineer. Although his career did not start in earnest until the '70s, he began using music production equipment at the age of 16.

== Career ==
=== Early career ===
Rushent's first experience in a recording studio was at EMI House in London's Manchester Square, when his school band (of which he was the lead singer) had the opportunity to record a demo. After leaving school, Rushent, who had already experimented with his father's 4-track recorder, worked at a chemical factory before working for his father while applying for studio jobs. After numerous rejections, Rushent was employed by Advision Studios as a 35mm film projectionist. After approximately three months, Rushent began working in the audio department as a tape operator alongside Tony Visconti. He worked on sessions for Fleetwood Mac, T. Rex, Yes, Emerson, Lake & Palmer, Petula Clark, Jerry Lee Lewis and Osibisa. Rushent stated that while at Advision, Jerry Lee Lewis threw a tantrum as Yes had been booked into the studio when he was not ready to leave, and chased the studio staff around the complex until they locked themselves in a different studio.

Rushent progressed to senior assistant engineer, staff engineer, and eventually head engineer. He then began working freelance, where he built his reputation and was employed by United Artists (UA). While with UA, Rushent recorded sessions alongside Martin Davies, recording artists such as Shirley Bassey and Buzzcocks, as well as convincing the company to sign the Stranglers provided that he produced the band's material. Rushent produced the group's Rattus Norvegicus, No More Heroes and Black and White albums and recorded demos for Joy Division, before tiring of his commute to London and left UA at the end of the 1970s.

=== Synth-pop ===
Rushent expressed a desire to move away from guitar bands, and bought a Linn LM-1 drum machine, Roland MC-8 Microcomposer and Jupiter-8 synthesiser to learn sequencing and synthesis techniques. In 1980, Rushent set up his own studio, Genetic, designed by renowned studio designer Eddie Veale, with Synclavier and Fairlight CMI synthesisers and an MCI console. He spent £35,000 on air conditioning alone, and had a Mitsubishi Electric digital recorder costing £75,000.

Rushent used his Roland equipment to record Pete Shelley's first solo album, Homosapien. Originally demos for the planned fourth Buzzcocks album, Shelley and Rushent deemed the recordings releasable, and Shelley was signed to Island Records. They were heard by Simon Draper of Virgin Records, who asked Rushent to produce for the Human League. Rushent's work on the group's 1981 album Dare earned him a BRIT Award in 1982 for Best British producer. Rushent's production on Dare frustrated the group's guitarist Jo Callis, as the only guitar on the album was used to trigger a gate on the synthesiser. Singer Susanne Sulley was also frustrated by the lengthy process of Rushent's synth programming. In 1983, Rushent walked out of his own studio after Sulley made an off-the-cuff comment toward him.

In 1982 Rushent made Love and Dancing, an album of remixes of tracks from Dare. With no samplers yet available, he reworked the material with a range of effects and made vocal stutters by cutting small pieces of tape and splicing them together with the help of a custom-made ruler. He described it as "the most creative experience I've ever had in my life". At Genetic he also produced all four singles by Leisure Process, the duo of Ross Middleton and Gary Barnacle, whom Epic Records had signed and sent to him after he finished Dare; the first, "Love Cascade", came out in March 1982.

Rushent also produced albums by Generation X, Altered Images and the Go-Go's in the 1980s.

Rushent decided to take a break from production in the 1990s, and sold his assets – including Genetic Studios. He briefly took up a consultancy position with Virgin, but retired from the industry to raise his children.

=== Later career ===
Rushent returned to the music industry in the mid-1990s when he established Gush, a dance club on Greenham Common. The club's opening night was headlined by the Prodigy with support from Mad Professor and LTJ Bukem. Rushent soon began redeveloping his interest in recording, and decided to catch up on the technological advances he had missed.

Rushent built a home studio around a Mackie console, Alesis ADAT HD24 recorder and Cubase 5, with which he produced music by the Pipettes, Does It Offend You, Yeah? and Killa Kela. In 2005, he produced Hazel O'Connor's album Hidden Heart. The following year, he was involved with the BBC Electric Proms when he recorded Enid Blitz, winners in the Brighton area, at a 15th-century manor house in Brentford, using a BBC truck as the control room.

In 2007, Rushent produced the recording Cherry Vanilla by the (Fabulous) Cult of John Harley. The recording was used by the American singer and actress Cherry Vanilla in the launch of her autobiography Lick Me: How I Became Cherry Vanilla.

At the time of his death, Rushent was working on a 30th anniversary version of Dare, remixed like Love and Dancing but using traditional musical instruments instead of synthesisers.

== Personal life ==
In 1972, Rushent married Linda Trodd, with whom he had three children. They separated in the 1980s, and Rushent later married Ceri Davis, with whom he had a daughter. Rushent lived in the Berkshire village of Upper Basildon. Rushent's son James is the lead singer of the dance-punk band Does It Offend You, Yeah?.

Rushent died on 4 June 2011, at his home in Berkshire.

== Discography ==
Year	Artist	Record	Type	Role	Reference
1970	Andrew Lloyd Webber	Jesus Christ Superstar	Studio album	Engineer	
1971	T-Rex	Electric Warrior	Studio album	Engineer	
1971	Gentle Giant	Acquiring the Taste	Studio album	Engineer	
1971	Compost	Compost	Studio album	Engineer, producer	
1971	Stone the Crows	Teenage Licks	Studio album	Engineer	
1971	Fleetwood Mac	Future Games	Studio album	Engineer	
1972	Groundhogs	Hogwash	Studio album	Engineer	
1972	Gentle Giant	Three Friends	Studio album	Engineer	
1972	Gentle Giant	Octopus	Studio album	Engineer	
1972	Stone the Crows	Ontinuous Performance	Studio album	Engineer	
1972	Shirley Bassey	I Capricorn	Studio album	Engineer	
1973	Curved Air	Air Cut	Studio album	Producer	
1973	Chaos	"Down At The Club" / "You Could Be My Girl"	Studio single	Composer, producer	
1973	Johnny Harris	All to Bring You Morning	Studio album	Engineer, remixing	
1973	Badger	One Live Badger	Live album	Engineer	
1974	Riff Raff	Original Man	Studio album	Engineer	
1974	The Sensational Alex Harvey Band	The Impossible Dream	Studio album	Engineer	
1974	Snafu	Situation Normal	Studio album	Engineer	
1974	Premiata Forneria Marconi	The World Became the World	Studio album	Engineer	
1975	Danny Kirwan	Second Chapter	Studio album	Producer	
1975	Banco del Mutuo Soccorso	Banco	Studio album	Engineer	
1975	Shirley Bassey	Good, Bad but Beautiful	Studio album	Engineer	
1975	Zzebra	Panic	Studio album	Engineer	
1976	Roderick Falconer	New Nation	Studio album	Engineer	
1976	McKendree Spring	Too Young to Feel This Old	Studio album	Engineer	
1977	The Stranglers	Rattus Norvegicus	Studio album	Producer	
1977	Shirley Bassey	You Take My Heart Away	Studio album	Engineer	
1977	The Stranglers	No More Heroes	Studio album	Producer	
1977	Téléphone	Téléphone	Studio album	Producer	
1977	Trickster	Find the Lady	Studio album	Producer	
1978	The Stranglers	Black and White	Studio album	Producer	
1978	Buzzcocks	Another Music in a Different Kitchen	Studio album	Producer	
1978	Generation X	Generation X	Studio album	Producer	
1978	Buzzcocks	Love Bites	Studio album	Producer	
1978	999	Separates	Studio album	Producer	
1978	Ian Gomm	Gomm with the Wind	Studio album	Producer	
1978	Dr Feelgood	Private Practice	Studio album	Producer	
1978	Ian Gomm	Summer Holiday	Studio album	Producer	
1979	The Stranglers	Live (X Cert)	Live album	Producer	
1979	Téléphone	Crache Ton Venin	Studio album	Producer	
1979	Buzzcocks	A Different Kind of Tension	Studio album	Producer	
1979	Jean-Jacques Burnel	Euroman Cometh	Studio album	Producer	
1980	Téléphone	Au Cœur De La Nuit	Studio album	Producer	
1980	Rachel Sweet	Protect the Innocent	Studio album	Producer	
1981	The Human League	Dare	Studio album	Producer	
1981	Pete Shelley	Homosapien	Studio album	Producer	
1981	The Raybeats	Guitar Beat	Studio album	Producer	
1981	Altered Images	Happy Birthday	Studio album	Engineer, producer	
1981	Deke Leonard	Before Your Very Eyes	Studio album	Engineer, producer	
1981	The dB's	Stands for Decibels	Studio album	Mixing	
1982	The Human League	Love and Dancing	Remix album	Producer	
1982	Altered Images	Pinky Blue	Studio album	Producer	
1982	The Members	Uprhythm, Downbeat	Studio album	Producer	
1983	The Human League	Fascination!	E.P.	Producer	
1983	Pete Shelley	XL1	Studio album	Producer	
1983	Intaferon	"Get Out Of London"	Single/12"	Producer	
1984	The Human League	Hysteria	Studio album	Programming	
1984	Hazel O'Connor	Smile	Studio album	Producer	
1984	The Go-Go's	Talk Show	Studio album	Engineer, producer	
1985	Associates	Perhaps	Studio album	Producer	
1988	Do-Re-Mi	The Happiest Place in Town	Studio album	Producer	
1988	Associates	"Heart of Glass"	Single	Producer	
1990	The Human League	"Heart Like a Wheel"	Single	Producer	
1990	Hard Corps	Metal + Flesh	Studio album	Producer	
1990	The Box	The Pleasure and the Pain	Studio album	Producer	
1993	Flop	Whenever You're Ready	Studio album	Producer	
1993	The Beautiful Babies	Serenade	Studio album	Producer	
1997	Ian Gomm	"Come On"	Single	Producer	
2005	Hazel O'Connor	Hidden Heart	Studio album	Producer	
2005	Carl Barat	Under the Influence	Studio album	Producer	
2009	Killa Kela	Amplified	Studio album	Producer	
2010	The Pipettes	Earth vs. The Pipettes	Studio album	Producer	
2011	Does It Offend You, Yeah?	Don't Say We Didn't Warn You	Studio album	Producer	
2011	The Pipettes	"Boo Shuffle"	Single	Producer	
