= Jet Black =

English rock drummer (1938–2022)

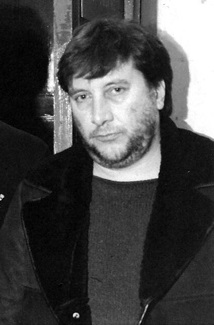
- Black in 1985

Background information
- Born: Brian John Duffy; 26 August 1938; Ilford, Essex, England
- Died: 6 December 2022 (aged 84) Wales
- Genres: Jazz; punk rock; new wave; post-punk
- Occupation: Drummer
- Years active: 1974–2018
- Formerly of: The Stranglers

Brian John Duffy (26 August 1938 – 6 December 2022), known professionally as Jet Black, was an English drummer and founding member of punk rock/new wave band the Stranglers. He last performed with the band in 2015, and officially retired in 2018.

== Early life ==
Brian John Duffy was born in Ilford, Essex, on 26 August 1938. He was a businessman up until the mid-1970s, owning a fleet of ice cream vans and an off-licence in Guildford called The Jackpot, that was the base for the early Stranglers. He was also the owner of one of the earliest home brewing equipment companies, at a time when home brewing was in vogue.

== Career ==
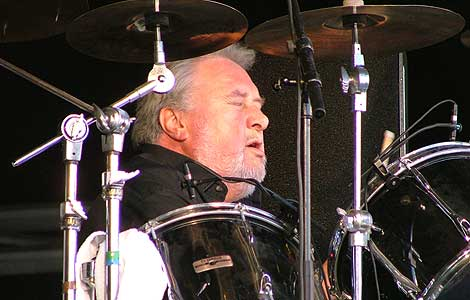
Black performing with the Stranglers at the 2006 Bestival

Duffy was known as Jet Black when he became a full-time professional musician in the mid-1970s and met Hugh Cornwell of the band Johnny Sox after reading an advertisement in Melody Maker magazine. Cornwell joined Black in the Stranglers in 1974.

His style was usually simple and jazz-influenced, although "Duchess" and "Down in the Sewer" are examples of Stranglers songs with more frantic drumming. In the mid-1980s, Black abandoned acoustic drums for studio recording for an electronic Simmons kit, most notably on the Feline and Aural Sculpture albums.

Black performed with the Stranglers until 2015, with his retirement confirmed by 2018. His name is frequently chanted by the crowd at concerts.

Black said he was particularly fond of The Raven album because it was "the first time the Stranglers got major critical approval in the newspapers."

Black had no contact with Hugh Cornwell after he left the band in 1990. According to Cornwell's 2004 autobiography, when he telephoned Black to say he was leaving The Stranglers, Black's laconic response was "OK, fine." In 2014, Black confirmed in a newspaper interview with the Oxford Times that he did not keep in touch with Cornwell.

Black wrote a short book, Much Ado About Nothing, which detailed the riots in France which were blamed on the Stranglers' presence in 1981, and also wrote a book in 2010 titled Seven Days in Nice about the same subject.

During a long career in music, Black (like many drummers) became aware of the practical limitations inherent in the design of the basic kit. Black addressed one issue with his patented 'Jet Black Power Bass Drum Pedal' which enables the bass drum to be placed anywhere and yet remain playable.

== Health issues ==
In March 2007, it was announced on the Stranglers' website that Black was suffering from atrial fibrillation and consequently refrained from appearing with the band until he had recovered. He returned to playing with the band in June, but he permanently retired from performing outside of the United Kingdom due to the strain of lengthy travel. During Black's absences, his temporary replacement was his full-time drum technician Ian Barnard (born 1983).

In mid-2008, Black was again absent from several Stranglers gigs. It was shortly thereafter announced that he was suffering from chest problems and was "not rushing back to work" on the advice of his doctor. In September 2008, he returned to full rehearsals and began touring with the band on 13 October.

During the Stranglers' 2010 and 2011 UK tours, Black performed at every gig. He played the full sets, which were approximately 90 minutes in length.

On 12 March 2012, Black was taken to hospital after "falling ill" shortly before a Stranglers concert at the O2 Academy Oxford. He was again replaced by Barnard during the gig. The Stranglers announced the following day that he had been taken to hospital via ambulance after feeling unwell shortly after the band's soundcheck. It was confirmed that the illness was a "severe chest infection" but that Black intended to rejoin the tour when he was "fit and able"; he did not rejoin the tour due to a slow recovery.

The Stranglers' annual tour began in March 2013, with Black playing the second half of the opening night set, drumming on 10 songs beginning with the distinctive Genetix drum intro. Drummer Jim Macaulay played the first half of the set on a separate, smaller drum kit. He had also by this time completely refrained from travelling outside of the UK with the band. Black did not feature at some subsequent gigs, but played half of the band's set at others where stage space would allow for the positioning of two drum kits. Jean-Jacques Burnel said ahead of the band's Leeds gig: "He's had a few health problems in recent years, but he's really up for the tour, although he probably won't be at every gig or doing the full set".

His appearances during the 2014 Ruby Anniversary tour were sporadic. When present, his playing was restricted to the encore only. During the tour, he was quoted as saying: "I'll carry on until I'm incapable of doing it. I am going to have to stop one day, but I expect the band will carry on". The bassist, Jean-Jacques Burnel, said during the same period, "When he can [no] longer contribute – and I don't think that's long – then there will be no more Stranglers". He remarked that Black was "on oxygen" even after drumming on slower numbers like "Golden Brown". In 2014, Black said of the Stranglers: "This is the best band in the world — and we'll carry on until we can't any more. Though we are not thinking about that". He was absent from the Stranglers' UK festival appearances and associated warm-up gigs in mid-2014.

In January 2015, Stranglers guitarist Baz Warne told the Louder Than War website: "Jet will do what he can when he can. He's a massive hard worker and he's never shirked away from anything but with the best will in the world you just can't cheat old age. I know a lot of the old fans say it's not the same without Jet, and they're absolutely right but there comes a time when you have to ask yourself a simple question; do you want to see The Stranglers without Jet or just accept that you'll never see them again?" Black's final appearance on stage with the Stranglers was at the Cambridge Corn Exchange on 20 March 2015.

== Retirement ==
Jean-Jacques Burnel confirmed, in a December 2015 interview, that Black would not take part in the band's 2016 tour. He said when questioned as to whether Black would be touring: "He can't. We tried that last year and I don't want him to become a freak show either. The most important thing for me is his health. If he can live a bit longer then that's a great thing. Physically he is in not a good place at all." Although he did not play with the band during their 2016 Black and White album tour, he continued to travel with the band, signing vinyl editions of the band's 1978 album, which were sold at gigs.

Shortly after his 78th birthday, Black said: "You find you just can't do some of the stuff you used to, and so the past seems so much more agreeable than the future ever could be. Something I guess we all get to know in time."

A promotional image released for the band's 2017 'Classics Collection' tour did not feature Black, and marked drummer Jim Macaulay's appearance in such an image for the first time. Black's departure from the band was officially confirmed in 2018 at the age of 79.

== Personal life ==
His second wife, Helena, left him following several arguments over the Stranglers rehearsing in their home during the early days of the band. In the 1990s, he lived in Tetbury, Gloucestershire, where he spent time designing and building wooden furniture. Duffy had two children, Charlotte and Anthony. At the time of his death he was married to Ava Rave.

In 2008, an online petition on the British Government website campaigning for him to be included in the next list of honours attracted 477 signatures and was mentioned in the national press.

== Death ==
Black died from respiratory problems at his home in Wales on 6 December 2022, at the age of 84. Reacting to the news, Cornwell said: "We shared a special period of our lives when we strived to become professional musicians. We were immediately drawn to one another, he had a singular sense of purpose that I identified with. The Stranglers' success was founded on his determination and drive."
