= Fire and Water =

Fire and Water may refer to:

== Art ==
- Fire and Water (sculpture), a 1988 artwork in Milwaukee, Wisconsin
- Fire and Water Fountain, a 1986 artwork in Tel Aviv, Israel

== Film and TV ==
- Fire and Water (Lexx), a location in the TV series Lexx
- "Fire + Water" (Lost), a 2006 episode of the television series Lost
- "Fire and Water" (Stargate SG-1), an episode of the television series Stargate SG-1

== Music ==
- "Fire and Water", 1971 hit single by Wilson Pickett
- Fire and Water (Free album), a 1970 album by Free
  - "Fire and Water", title track on the album
- Fire & Water (Ecoutez Vos Murs), a 1983 album by Dave Greenfield and Jean-Jacques Burnel
- "Fire and Water", a song by XYZ on the 1991 album Hungry

== See also ==
- Firewater (disambiguation)
- Water and Fire, a 2001 film
