= List of UK Country Albums Chart number ones of 2022 =

These are the Official Charts Company's UK Country Albums Chart number ones of 2022. The chart week runs from Friday to Thursday with the chart-date given as the following Thursday. Chart positions are based the multi-metric consumption of country music in the United Kingdom, blending traditional album sales, track equivalent albums, and streaming equivalent albums. The chart contains 20 positions.

In the iteration of the chart dated 7 January, Taylor Swift's Fearless re-recording continued its run at number one, and remained in the top spot for the first three weeks of 2022 before being displaced by Kiefer Sutherland's third album Bloor Street. Swift would subsequently spend a total of ten weeks at number one throughout the year. 10 Year Plan, the fifth studio album by British duo The Shires spent the most weeks at number one in 2022, with twelve nonconsecutive weeks atop the chart. Carrie Underwood's Denim & Rhinestones reached the top spot for two weeks before Luke Combs's third album Growin' Up debuted on the chart dated 1 July, and spent eight weeks at number one throughout the year. Miranda Lambert and Steve Earle were the only other artists to spend more than one week at number one with their albums Palomino and Jerry Jeff respectively. The final chart topper of the year was The Morning After by Irish singer Nathan Carter, his fifth album to reach number one.

== Chart history ==
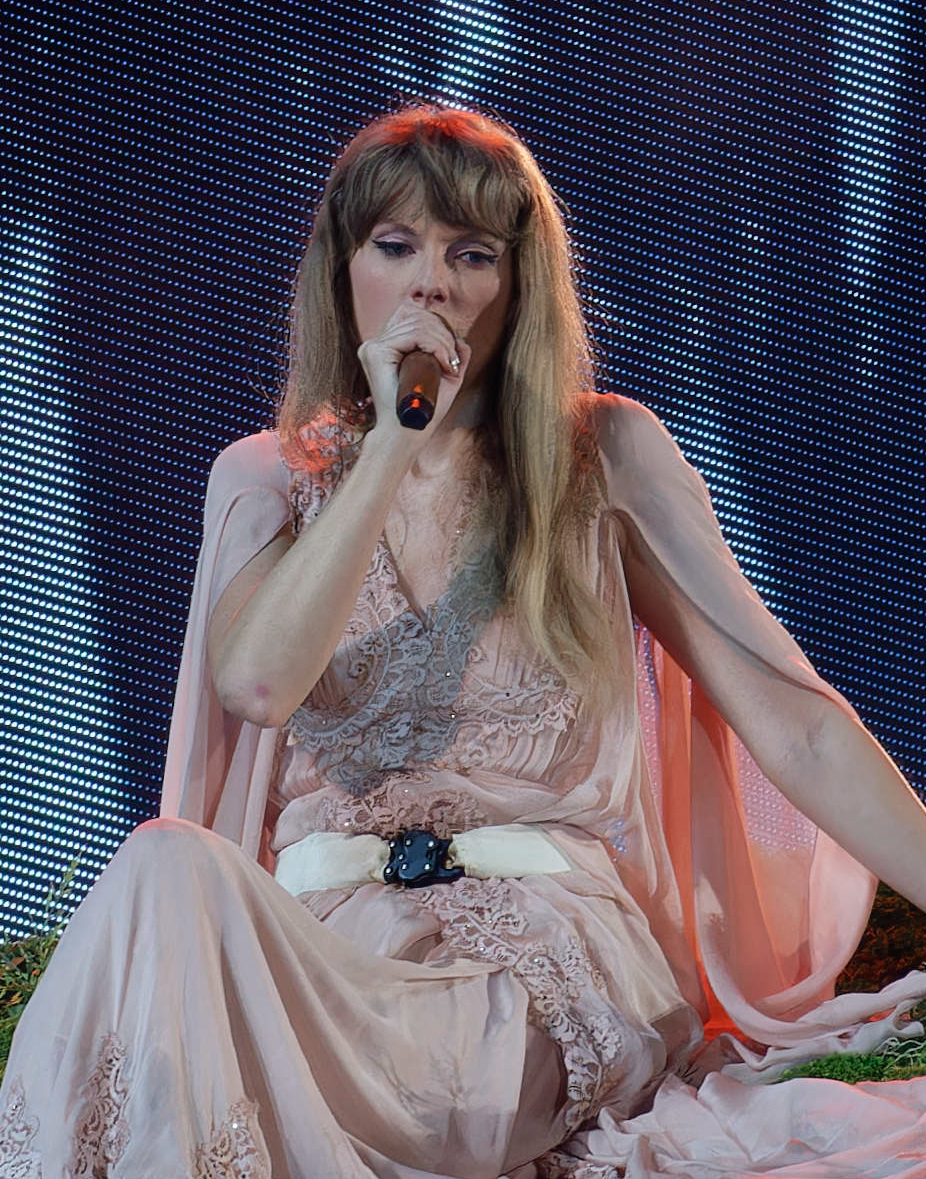
Taylor Swift's Fearless (Taylor's Version) was the first number one of 2022, and spent ten non-consecutive weeks at the top spot throughout the year.

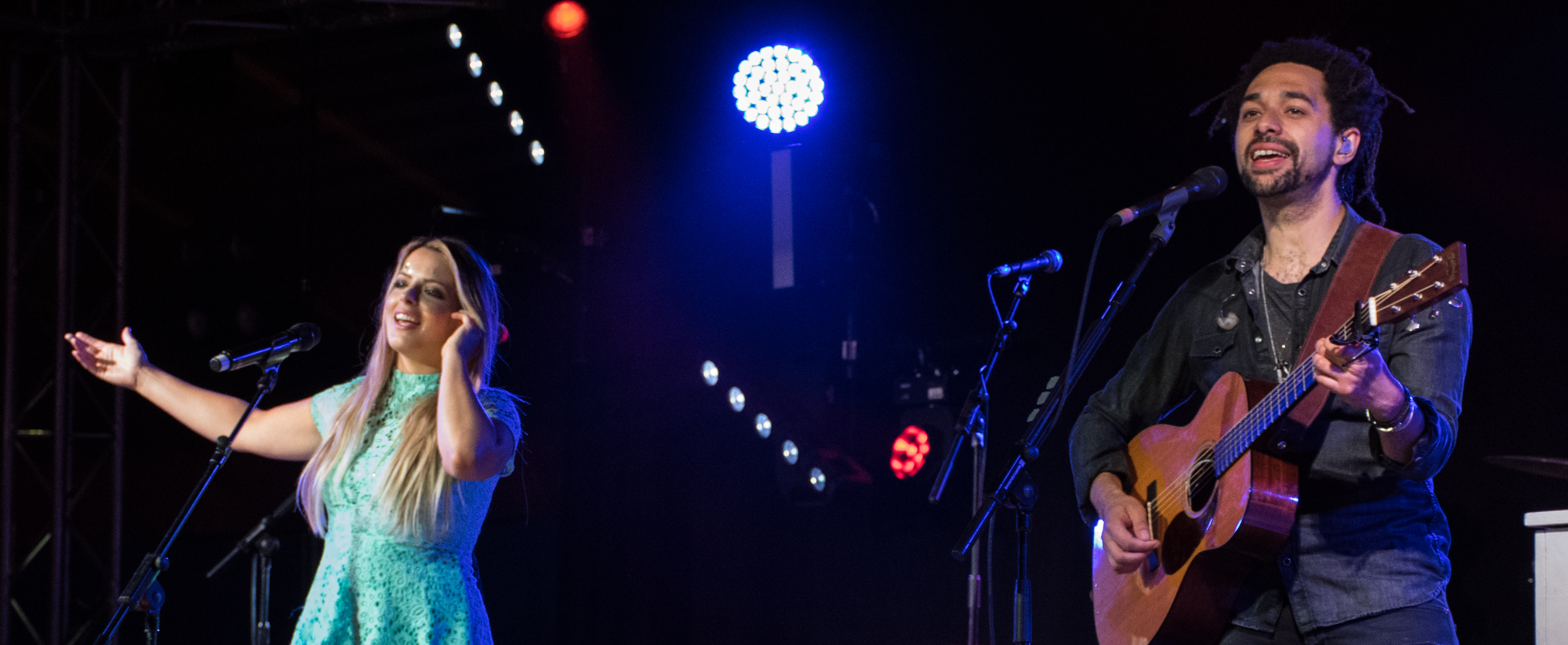
The Shires spent a leading twelve weeks at number one with their fifth album 10 Year Plan.

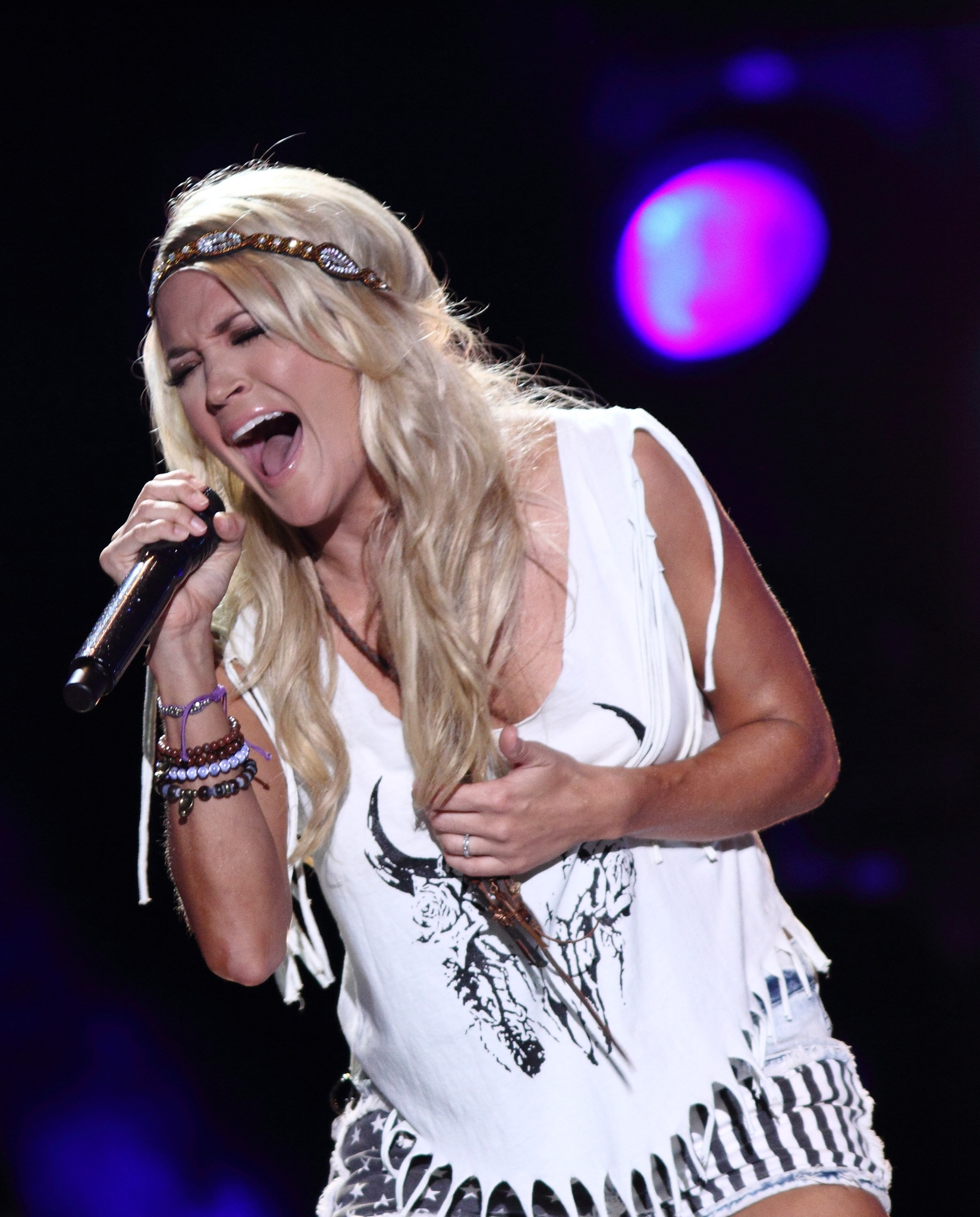
Carrie Underwood's Denim & Rhinestones spent two weeks at number one, her seventh album to reach the top spot, tying her with LeAnn Rimes and Dolly Parton for third most number one albums on the chart.

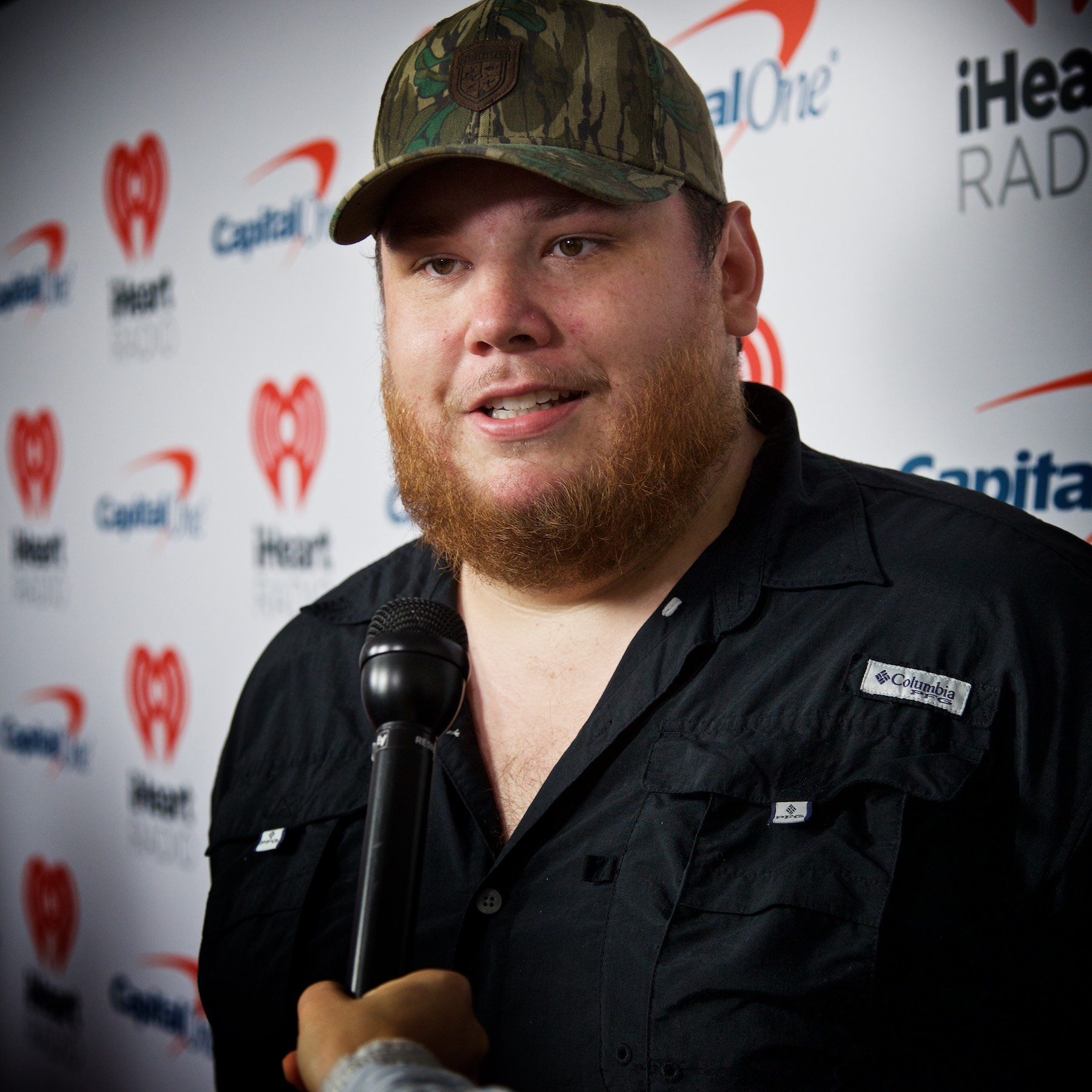
Luke Combs' third album Growin' Up was number one for a combined eight weeks.

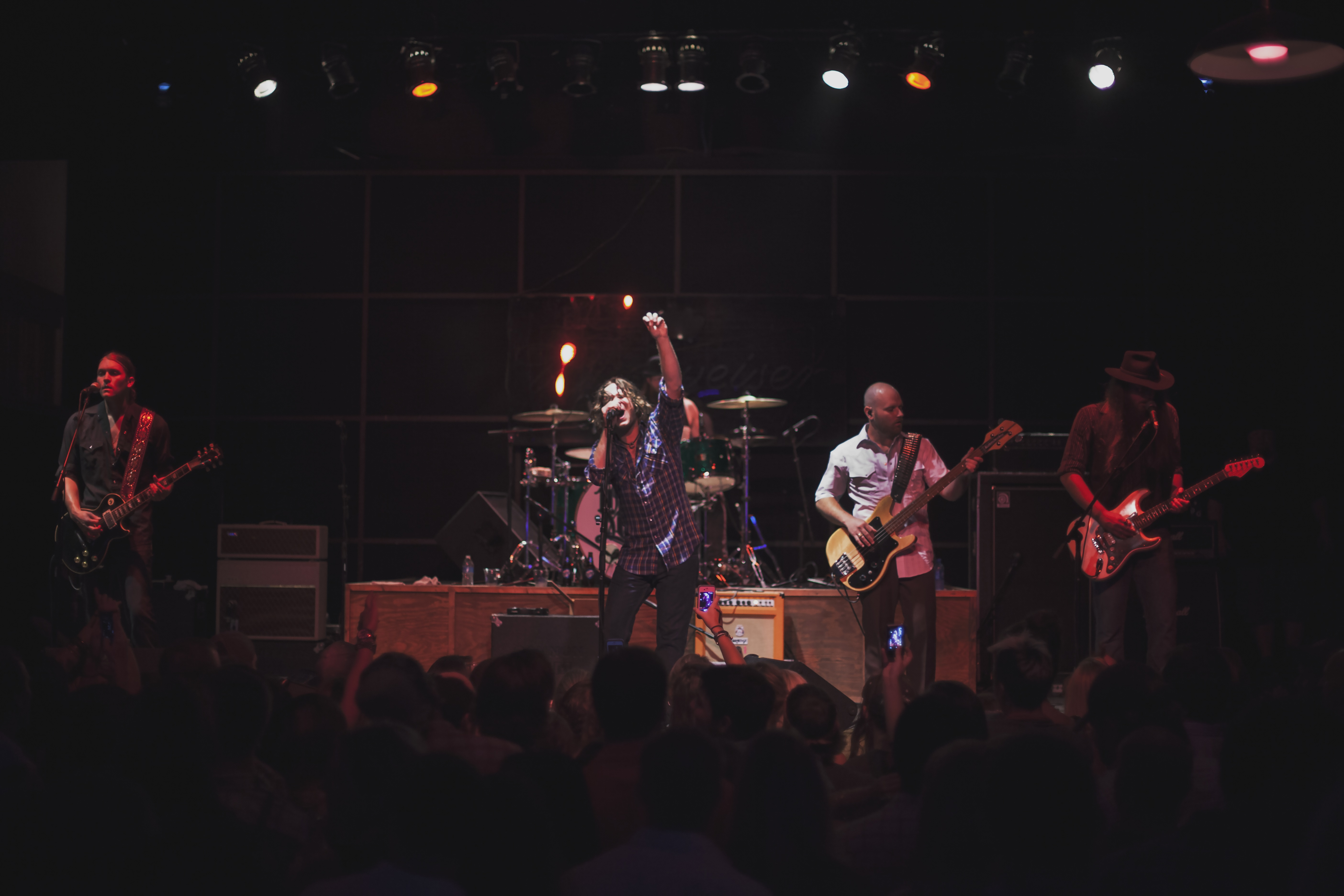
Tornillo by Whiskey Myers spent three consecutive weeks at number one.

Issue date	Album	Artist(s)	Record label	Ref.
7 January	Fearless (Taylor's Version)	Taylor Swift	EMI	
14 January	Fearless (Taylor's Version)	Taylor Swift	EMI	
21 January	Fearless (Taylor's Version)	Taylor Swift	EMI	
28 January	Bloor Street	Kiefer Sutherland	Cooking Vinyl	
4 February	Bloor Street	Kiefer Sutherland	Cooking Vinyl	
11 February	Lu's Jukebox Vol 6: You Are Cordially Invited... A Tribute to The Rolling Stones	Lucinda Williams	Highway 20	
18 February	Bloor Street	Kiefer Sutherland	Cooking Vinyl	
25 February	Fearless (Taylor's Version)	Taylor Swift	EMI	
4 March	Fearless (Taylor's Version)	Taylor Swift	EMI	
11 March	Run, Rose, Run	Dolly Parton	Butterfly	
18 March	10 Year Plan	The Shires	BMG	
25 March	10 Year Plan	The Shires	BMG	
1 April	10 Year Plan	The Shires	BMG	
8 April	10 Year Plan	The Shires	BMG	
15 April	10 Year Plan	The Shires	BMG	
22 April	10 Year Plan	The Shires	BMG	
29 April	10 Year Plan	The Shires	BMG	
6 May	Palomino	Miranda Lambert	Sony	
13 May	Palomino	Miranda Lambert	Sony	
20 May	The Last Resort: Greetings From	Midland	Big Machine	
27 May	10 Year Plan	The Shires	BMG	
3 June	10 Year Plan	The Shires	BMG	
10 June	10 Year Plan	The Shires	BMG	
17 June	Denim & Rhinestones	Carrie Underwood	EMI	
24 June	Denim & Rhinestones	Carrie Underwood	EMI	
1 July	Growin' Up	Luke Combs	Sony	
8 July	Growin' Up	Luke Combs	Sony	
15 July	Growin' Up	Luke Combs	Sony	
22 July	Growin' Up	Luke Combs	Sony	
29 July	Growin' Up	Luke Combs	Sony	
5 August	Tornillo	Whiskey Myers	Wiggy Thump	
12 August	Tornillo	Whiskey Myers	Wiggy Thump	
19 August	Tornillo	Whiskey Myers	Wiggy Thump	
26 August	10 Year Plan	The Shires	BMG	
2 September	10 Year Plan	The Shires	BMG	
9 September	Jerry Jeff	Steve Earle	New West	
16 September	Jerry Jeff	Steve Earle	New West	
23 September	Growin' Up	Luke Combs	Sony	
30 September	CrazyTown	Beth Nielsen Chapman	Cooking Vinyl	
7 October	Subject to Change	Kelsea Ballerini	Black River	
14 October	Lindeville	Ashley McBryde	Rhino	
21 October	Rolling Golden Holy	Bonny Light Horseman	37d03d	
28 October	Fearless (Taylor's Version)	Taylor Swift	EMI	
4 November	Fearless (Taylor's Version)	Taylor Swift	EMI	
11 November	Growin' Up	Luke Combs	Sony	
18 November	I Wish You Well	Daniel O'Donnell	DMG	
25 November	Fearless (Taylor's Version)	Taylor Swift	EMI	
2 December	Fearless (Taylor's Version)	Taylor Swift	EMI	
9 December	Fearless (Taylor's Version)	Taylor Swift	EMI	
16 December	Pure & Simple	Derek Ryan	Sharpe Music	
23 December	Growin' Up	Luke Combs	Sony	
30 December	The Morning After	Nathan Carter	Sharpe Music	

== Most weeks at number one ==
Weeks at number one	Artist
12	The Shires
10	Taylor Swift
8	Luke Combs
3	Kiefer Sutherland
3	Whiskey Myers
2	Carrie Underwood
2	Miranda Lambert
2	Steve Earle

== See also ==
- List of UK Albums Chart number ones of 2022
- List of UK Dance Singles Chart number ones of 2022
- List of UK Album Downloads Chart number ones of 2022
- List of UK Independent Albums Chart number ones of 2022
- List of UK R&B Albums Chart number ones of 2022
- List of UK Rock & Metal Albums Chart number ones of 2022
- List of UK Compilation Chart number ones of the 2020s
