= Polyphonic Size =

Belgian new wave band

- Origin: Belgium
- Genres: New wave, minimal wave, electronic rock
- Years active: 1979–1991, 2010–present
- Labels: Sandwich Records, New Rose, Virgin
- Members: Roger-Marc Vande Voorde; Alice Vande Voorde; Mandy Vande Voorde; Mika Nagazaki; Dominique Buxin
- Past members: Martine Bourlée; Ann VW; Glen Vande Voorde; Regine K Jean Marc Lederman; Bernard Dradin; Pierre Gillet; France Lhermitte; Kloot Per W Jill; Géraldine

Polyphonic Size is a Belgian new wave band founded in 1979 in Brussels by Roger-Marc Vande Voorde. Mixing electric guitars and synthesizers with French and English lyrics (and sometimes German or Japanese lyrics), most of Polyphonic Size records were produced by Jean-Jacques Burnel, from The Stranglers.

== History ==
=== 1979-1984 ===
The first Polyphonic Size record, Algorhythmic EP, was released in December 1979, on Sandwich Records, a new independent record label founded by Michel Lambot. After a second EP (Pragmatic Songs), Roger-Marc got in touch with Jean-Jacques Burnel, who offered to produce the next single, Nagasaki Mon Amour. This first musical collaboration was followed by many others, including an outrageous and robotic cover of the Rolling Stones' classic, Mother's Little Helper. After several line-up changes, the band finally consisted of Roger-Marc Vande Voorde (vocals, guitar, keyboards, electronics), Kloot Per W (bass, vocals), Martine Bourlée (vocals, percussions) and France Lhermitte (vocals, percussions). Dominique Buxin wrote nearly all the lyrics, but never appeared live on stage or on any record sleeve. Although Polyphonic Size and JJ Burnel were very close to each other, the band always kept his own personality, less dark, more European, than the Stranglers. On 3 April 1981 Polyphonic Size gave their very first concert at the First Belgian Rhythm Box Contest, in Brussels.

Polyphonic Size's debut album, Live For Each Moment / Vivre Pour Chaque Instant, was released in September 1982. Still produced by JJ Burnel, it is widely considered as their best work, including two of their finest tracks ever: Winston & Julia (based on Orwell's 1984) and Je T'ai Toujours Aimée (recorded in 2 hours, with JJ Burnel on vocals and bass). Reviewing the album, Trouser Press observed "lovely synthesizer art-pop" that "resembles Orchestral Manoeuvres' lighter work".

In November 82 the band started their first European tour, including a stop at the famous Paris club "Les Bains Douches". The whole concert was broadcast on France Inter (popular French radio station).

Polyphonic Size second album, Walking Everywhere, was released in January 1984 on Virgin Records. Produced in London by JJ, it is more centred on synthesizers sounds. It also includes the band new single, Walking Class Hero, as well as several guest musicians, like Daniel B (Front 242) and Dave Greenfield (The Stranglers). A new European tour followed, without France Lhermitte, who was now replaced by AnnVW.

=== 1985-1991 ===
The second half of the 80's was not so easy for Polyphonic Size, dealing with problems and conflicts concerning their record contract. Many demos were recorded in those days, but the bulk of them still remain unreleased. The band line up changed many times, but always featured Roger-Marc Vande Voorde and Martine Bourlée. In 1987, Polyphonic Size played in Moscow, Irkutsk and Beijing, as part of a cultural exchange between Belgium, USSR and China, turning the Trans-Siberian train into an artistic residence. On 24 June 1988 the group played at the famous Marquee Club in London. On 6 April 1989 they appeared at the Printemps de Bourges Festival, opening for JJ Burnel, as part of his second solo album tour, Un Jour Parfait, for which Dominique Buxin wrote some lyrics.

The next single was released in 1986 : L'amour / Everybody Needs Your Sex, followed two years later by a new album, The Overnight Day. Produced by Nigel Gray, it has a more pop sound, and includes a cover of Michel Polnareff, Tout Tout Pour Ma Chérie. New studio sessions began in England in June 1989, with the help of Daniel Darc (from the French band Taxi Girl), who wrote several lyrics. These sessions appeared in 1991 on The Prime Story, first Polyphonic Size's compilation CD. But the 80's were over, the magic was gone, and in November 1991, the P Size Info Service announced the (temporary) death of the band.

=== Comeback ===
In 2009, VOD Records released a 4 vinyl records boxset (plus a 10" bonus), featuring the complete Polyphonic Size 1979-1982 recordings along with two hours of unreleased tracks, demos and outtakes. The group reformed in April 2010, with Roger-Marc, France and Kloot Per W, plus Martine and Roger-Marc's daughters : Mandy (keyboards) and Alice (guitar). Together, they gave two concerts in Brussels on April 30 and May 5, with JJ Burnel as special guest, singing Je T'ai Toujours Aimée on stage for the very first time. In September, they play at the Botanique, for the Nuits Du Soir Festival. Early 2011, Kloot Per W quits PS, and is replaced by Mika Nagazaki, Ghinzu bass player. In July 2011, Polyphonic Size line-up changes again, with Jill and Géraldine (from the Belgian band Les Vedettes) replacing France Lhermitte on vocals until the end of 2012.

In 2025, Polyphonic Size releases on its official Bandcamp page In Search Of Lost Tapes 1 (1978 - 1982) and In Search Of Lost Tapes 2 (1984 - 1987), compilations of unissued tracks, demos, outtakes and instrumental versions.

== Discography ==
=== Albums ===
- Live for Each Moment / Vivre Pour Chaque Instant (Sandwich Records (Belgium) / New Rose Records (France),1982)
- Walking Everywhere (Virgin records, 1984)
- The Overnight Day (New Rose records, 1988)
- The Prime Story (compilation, best of) (PIAS records, 1991)
- Saison 1979-1982 (vinyl LPs boxset with the complete 79-82 discography + unreleased material, VOD records, 2009)
- Earlier / Later (vinyl LP compilation of early Polyphonic Size material, featuring one unreleased track, Minimal Wave Records, 2013)
- In Search Of Lost Tapes 1 1978 - 1982 (compilation of demos, outtakes and instrumental versions, Bandcamp download, 2025)
- In Search Of Lost Tapes 2 1984 - 1987 (compilation of demos and unreleased tracks, Bandcamp download, 2025)

=== Singles and maxi singles ===
- Algorhythmic EP (1979)
- "Pragmatic Songs" (1980)
- "Nagasaki Mon Amour" / "Hiroshima 1945" (1980)
- "PS" (maxi 5 titres, 1981)
- "Nagasaki Mon Amour" / "Kyoto" (version) (1981)
- "Polyphonic Size" (maxi 5 titres, 1982)
- "Mother's Little Helper" (1982)
- "Winston & Julia" (Remix) (1982)
- "Je T'ai Toujours Aimée" (1982)
- "Night Is Coming On" / "RDA-RFA" (Dans Les Gares) (1983)
- "Walking Class Hero" / "Happy Couples" (1984)
- "L'Amour" / "Everybody Needs Your Sex" (1986)
- "Le Soleil des Voyous" / "Leave the World" (1988)
- "Tell Me" / "Do the Ouagadougou" (1988)
- "Nosotros" / "Ton Physique" (1991)
- "Tomorrow" / "Tomorrow" (Hard Mix) (1991)

=== Compilations ===
- B9 (Sandwich Records LP, featuring one Polyphonic Size song, 1981)
- Mask Production, Concert in Gent (live compilation featuring 2 Polyphonic Size songs, 1984)

=== Cassettes (self production) ===
- Black Cassette (Studio 79-87)
- Live Cassette (82-88)
- Polyphonic Size '89
