= Un Jour Parfait =

Studio album by Jean-Jacques Burnel
- Released: 23 September 1988
- Genre: Pop
- Length: 44:27 (CD); 39:58 (LP)
- Label: Epic
- Producer: Jean-Jacques Burnel

Jean-Jacques Burnel chronology
Fire & Water (Ecoutez Vos Murs) (with Dave Greenfield) (1983)	Un Jour Parfait (1988)	Gankutsuou (Soundtrack) (2005)

Singles from Un Jour Parfait
- 1. "Le Whiskey" Released: 1988; 2. "Rêves" Released: 1988

Alternative cover
- 1994 and 1998 reissues album cover

Un Jour Parfait (French for "a perfect day") is the second solo album by the Stranglers' bassist Jean-Jacques Burnel, released on 23 September 1988 by Epic Records. The album was aimed at the French market and its release limited to certain territories, but was available in the UK as an import. All songs were written in French, except "Garden of Eden".

== Background ==
In a 1992 interview, Burnel explained: "with this I wanted to do something with French sounds and sensibilities". Pat Gilbert of Record Collector magazine described the album as a "collection of melodic pop songs ... including a number of Latin-tinged tracks which faintly echoed the light, whimsical strains of the Stranglers' Feline album." In his book Peaches: A Chronicle of The Stranglers 1974-1990, Robert Endeacott described it as having "a gentle Euro disco vibe mixed in with a strong sense of melancholy, soaked in majestic keyboards."

The track "Weekend" is a reworking of "Les Dames de Rochefort", a 1988 song by Belgian band Glacier Georges.

The album was reissued on CD in 1994 by Stranglers Information Service and again in 1998 by Eastworld Recordings. Both reissues featured new cover artwork and bonus tracks.

== Track listing ==
All lyrics and music written by Jean-Jacques Burnel, except where noted.

No.	Title	Lyrics	Music	Length
1.	"Un Jour Parfait (Thème)" (instrumental)			0:43
2.	"Si J'étais"			4:34
3.	"Weekend"	Burnel, Glaciers George	Burnel, Glaciers George	4:26
4.	"Triste Ville Ce Soir"			3:13
5.	"Un Jour Parfait"	Stern		5:47
6.	"Via Dolorosa"	Dominique Buxin		4:19
7.	"Le Whiskey"	Buxin		4:51
8.	"Crazy (She Drives Me)"	Burnel, Stern		3:07
9.	"Garden of Eden"			4:17
10.	"Rêves"	Burnel, Buxin		3:21
11.	"Waltz" (instrumental)			1:32
12.	"Via Dolorosa" (Spanish version) (CD only)	Burnel, Santiago Auserón		4:29
Total length:				44:27

1994 CD reissue bonus tracks
No.	Title	Lyrics	Length
13.	"Le Whiskey" (12" mix)	Buxin	5:08
14.	"Elle Assure" (non-album single, 1989)		3:41
15.	"Rêves" (12" mix)	Burnel, Buxin	4:53
Total length:			58:11

1998 CD reissue bonus track

This reissue includes the same 3 bonus tracks, and in the same order, as the 1994 reissue.

No.	Title	Length
16.	"Les Mensonges et les Larmes" (previously unreleased)	4:42
Total length:		62:53

== Personnel ==
Adapted from the album liner notes.

Musicians

- Jean-Jacques Burnel - bass, guitar, programming, drums
- Dave Greenfield - keyboards
- Glaciers George - keyboards on "Weekend"
- Alex Gifford - saxophone
- Chris Lawrence - trombone
- Jason Votier - trumpet

Technical

- Jean-Jacques Burnel - producer, engineer
- Owen Morris - engineer
- Dave Greenfield - engineer
- Bang Hai Ja - cover painting
- Jean-Yves Legras - photography
- Grant Louden - graphics
- Jean-Luke Epstein - graphics
- Simon J. Webb - cover design (1994 and 1998 reissues)
