= Firewater =

Firewater may refer to:

== Liquid ==
- High-proof beverages, particularly illegal moonshine
- Firewater (fire fighting), the polluted water remaining after fire fighting
- Fire water, water stored in tanks for wildfire suppression
- Medronho, a Portuguese fruit brandy

== Art and entertainment ==
- Firewater (band), a US indie rock group founded by Tod A. in 1995
- Firewater (film), Hardi Volmer's Estonian history-based thriller
- Firewater (Tha Alkaholiks album), 2006
- Firewater (Silkworm album), 1996
- Firewater (Whiskey Myers album), 2011
- Firewater Studios, digital recording studio

== See also ==
- Fire and Water (disambiguation)
- Firewater myths
