= Euroman Cometh =

Studio album by J.J. Burnel
- Released: 6 April 1979
- Recorded: 1978
- Studio: TW Studios (London SW6) and Eden Studios (London W4)
- Genre: New wave
- Length: 37:10
- Label: United Artists
- Producer: J.J. Burnel; Alan Winstanley; Martin Rushent

J.J. Burnel chronology
Euroman Cometh (1979)	Fire and Water (Ecoutez Vos Murs) (1983)

Singles from Euroman Cometh
- 1. "Freddie Laker (Concorde and Eurobus)" Released: 13 April 1979

Professional ratings
Review scores
Source	Rating
The Great Rock Discography	3/10

Euroman Cometh is the debut solo album by English musician J.J. Burnel, released in April 1979 by United Artists. It is a concept album, as most of the songs concern the ideal of a united Europe, both culturally and economically. Upon release, the album was a contrast to the more melodic songs of Burnel’s group the Stranglers, containing what Pat Gilbert of Record Collector describes as "a collection of dark, atmospheric soundscapes, embroidered with Burnel's intense, monotone theorising about a united Europe."

== Release ==
Despite a mixed critical reception, Euroman Cometh reached number 40 in the UK Albums Chart in April 1979. The track "Freddie Laker (Concorde and Eurobus)" was released as a single on 13 April 1979, backed with the non-album track "Ozymandias". Though being the most Stranglers-like track on the album, the single did not chart.

== Music and lyrical themes ==
Musically, Euroman Cometh was an attempt at incorporating electronic sounds into rock. "I was quite a big Kraftwerk fan already by then," Burnel said in 2009. "I was also a Can fan right from a teenager. So I liked that metronomic sort of thing and I then put my own slant on it because I was playing most of the instruments in the studio." Lyrically, it evolved around the idea of a United States of Europe in the context of the Cold War. "A Europe riddled with american values and soviet subversion is a diseased sycophantic old whore: a Europe strong, united and independent is a child of the future", states Burnel on the inner sleeve.

"Freddie Laker (Concorde and Eurobus)" is a rant against big business and Americans, and a homage to British airline entrepreneur Freddie Laker, "who epitomised the lengths the Americans would go to fuck over the European," Burnel said in 2009. According to Stuart Bolton, writing for The Burning Up Times magazine, "Euromess" is not "purely an anti-Soviet rant but more a pro-European call for solidarity." It is also a lament for Jan Palach, the Czech student who burned himself to death after the 1968 invasion of Czechoslovakia by the Warsaw Pact armies.

However, not every song relates directly to Europe or the past. "Jellyfish" relates to having a broad mind, accommodating ideas and not being narrow. And the album's cover song, "Pretty Face", isn't linked to the European idea at all. "It doesn't really have any bearing on the rest of the album," Burnel said, "it was just a track I loved." Keeping in line with the European concept, the vocals on Euroman Cometh are sung in English, French ("Euroman", "Tout Comprendre") and German ("Deutschland Nicht Uber Alles").

The album title, Burnel believes, may have come from the 1946 play The Iceman Cometh by Eugene O'Neill.

== Recording ==
The initial work on the album began at TW Studios in London during the recording of the Stranglers' Black and White album in February 1978. Without a home at the time, Burnel was mostly spending the night in the studio, and each night after the Stranglers sessions, he would write and record. He would use a beatbox machine which had different settings, such as rock and roll, salsa, and rumba. "All these different rhythms [where] you couldn't change the single pattern, but you could speed it up," he said. "It was a similar thing they'd put into organs at the time." With no pre-written songs, Burnel found it useful, creatively, to record basslines or guitar parts over a rhythm and building it up from there. "So very quickly I built up a little body of work and I thought, "oh God, I'm halfway to an album, I might as well carry on." The Stranglers' record label United Artists then agreed to issue the album. Guest musicians were Peter Howells of the Drones (drums on tracks three, five and six), track nine featured Brian James of the Damned (guitar), Lew Lewis (harmonica) and Carey Fortune of Chelsea (drums). All other instruments were played by Burnel.

== Album cover ==
The album cover features a photograph of the Centre Georges Pompidou in Paris, which officially opened in 1977. It was chosen for the album cover because it was architecturally grandiose, representing modernity and radical new thinking.

Printed on the sleeve is a tribute to the Meriden Motorcycle Co-operative that manufactured Triumph motorcycles between 1976 and 1983. The tribute reads, "The Triumph Workers Co-operative at Meriden have proved that personally motivated enterprise coupled with group interest is a necessary ingredient in successful socialism and the sham they call nationalisation could only be suggested and perpetrated by enemies of the people." The engine of Burnel's 750cc Triumph Bonneville T140, manufactured by the Meriden Co-operative, is heard during the track "Triumph (Of the Good City)", forming the basis of the song's percussion.

== Aftermath ==
To promote the album, Burnel assembled the Euroband, containing Peter Howells, keyboardist Penny Tobin (ex-Nick Lowe's Last Chicken in the Shop) and guitarist John Ellis (ex-the Vibrators), for a UK tour all through April. With a 45-minute set featuring no Stranglers songs, the tour suffered from poor ticket sales, resulting in three gigs being cancelled. The band's performance at the Pavilion in Hemel Hempstead on 25 April was recorded, and included as bonus tracks on two reissues of Euroman Cometh.

"I thought [Euroman Cometh] was quite poppy and people said it was off the wall and leftfield but I didn’t see it in those terms," Burnel said in 2009. In 2015, he said, "It was an experiment and a way of passing the time of night. It was as also bit of a manifesto. I was a big fan of the concept of a united Europe ... I still think it's one of the great ideas of our times but I am wary of the bureaucracy and the bad elements of it but as a pure concept it's a great concept."

By the 2010s, Euroman Cometh had sold close to 100,000 copies. Peter Hook, bassist with New Order, considers the album to be one of his greatest influences.

== Reissues ==
Euroman Cometh was reissued by EMI in 1992 and by Eastworld Recordings in 1998. Both reissues include a 35 minutes live recording as bonus tracks.

== Track listing ==
All tracks are written by Jean-Jacques Burnel, except where indicated

No.	Title	Writer(s)	Length
1.	"Euroman"		3:28
2.	"Jellyfish"		2:55
3.	"Freddie Laker (Concorde and Eurobus)"		3:30
4.	"Euromess"		3:50
5.	"Deutschland Nicht Uber Alles"		4:39
6.	"Do the European"		4:28
7.	"Tout Comprendre"		3:08
8.	"Triumph (Of the Good City)"		4:15
9.	"Pretty Face"	Chris Boyle, Gavin Daneski, Ralph Worman, Vic Sendall, Geoff Farndell	1:50
10.	"Crabs"		2:10
11.	"Eurospeed (Your own Speed)"		2:38

- "Pretty Face" is a cover of a song by 1960s British R&B group the Beat Merchants.

=== 1992 and 1998 reissue bonus tracks ===
Note: The 1992 reissue did not include "Ozymandias", only the nine live tracks.

No.	Title	Length
12.	"Ozymandias" (B-side of "Freddie Laker (Concorde and Eurobus)" single)	2:27

Live at Hemel Hempstead
No.	Title	Writer(s)	Length
13.	"Ode to Joy" / "Do the European"	Ludwig van Beethoven / Burnel	5:12
14.	"Deutschland Nicht Uber Alles"		4:15
15.	"Eurospeed"		3:01
16.	"Crabs"		3:44
17.	"Tout Comprendre"		2:58
18.	"Freddie Laker (Concorde and Eurobus)"		3:29
19.	"Jellyfish"		3:51
20.	"Triumph (Of the Good City)"		4:48
21.	"Euroman"		5:52
Total length:			76:32

- Tracks 13–21 were recorded live at the Pavilion in Hemel Hempstead on 25 April 1979.

== Personnel ==
Adapted from the original album liner notes.

Musicians

- J.J. Burnel – vocals, keyboards, guitar, bass, beatbox
- Peter Howells – drums (tracks 3, 5 and 6)
- Brian James – guitar (track 9)
- Lew Lewis – harmonica (track 9)
- Carey Fortune – drums (track 9)

Technical

- J.J. Burnel – producer, mixing, sleeve concept
- Alan Winstanley – producer, engineer (except tracks 2 and 8)
- Martin Rushent – producer, engineer (tracks 2 and 8), mixing
- George Peckham – mastering
- Allan Ballard – photography of Pompidou Centre, Paris
- Tracy Gerard – inner sleeve map
- Kevin Sparrow – design co-ordination

Live bonus tracks

Adapted from the 1998 reissue liner notes, except where noted.

- J.J. Burnel – vocals, bass, arrangements, producer
- John Ellis – guitar
- Penny Tobin – keyboards
- Peter Howells – drums
- Alan Winstanley – recording engineer
- Gareth Cousins – mixing
