= Early Morning Shakes =

Studio album by Whiskey Myers
- Released: 4 February 2014 (US)
- Genres: Southern rock; hard rock; country rock
- Length: 52:35
- Label: Wiggy Thump Records
- Producer: Dave Cobb

Whiskey Myers chronology
Firewater (2011)	Early Morning Shakes (2014)	Mud (2016)

Professional ratings
Review scores
Source	Rating
AllMusic	3/5 stars

Early Morning Shakes is the third studio album by American rock band Whiskey Myers. It was released on February 4, 2014, through Wiggy Thump Records in the United States.

== Track listing ==
No.	Title	Writer(s)	Length
1.	"Early Morning Shakes"	Cody Cannon	3:17
2.	"Hard Row to Hoe"	Cannon, Kendell Marvel	4:26
3.	"Dogwood"	Cannon, Brent Cobb, Aaron Raitiere	4:13
4.	"Shelter from the Rain"	Cannon, Cobb, Raitiere	3:36
5.	"Home"	Cannon, Cobb, Raitiere	3:30
6.	"Headstone"	Cannon, Dave Pahanish	4:19
7.	"Where the Sun Don't Shine"	Cannon, Raitiere, Cody Tate	3:28
8.	"Reckoning"	Cannon	4:29
9.	"Wild Baby Shake Me"	Cannon, Adam Hood, Tate	5:52
10.	"Lightning"	Cannon	5:47
11.	"Need a Little Time Off for Bad Behavior"	David Allan Coe, Bobby Keel, Larry Latimer	3:26
12.	"Colloquy"	Tate	6:12

== Personnel ==
=== Whiskey Myers ===
- Cody Cannon - lead vocals, rhythm guitar
- John Jeffers - guitars, lap steel guitar, slide guitar, backing vocals
- Cody Tate - guitars, backing vocals
- Gary Brown - bass
- Jeff Hogg - drums

=== Additional musicians ===
- Michael Webb - keyboards
- Chris Hennessee - harp
- Kristen Rogers - backing vocals

=== Production ===
- Dave Cobb - producer, mixing
- Mark Needham - mixing
- Will Brierre - mixing assistant
- Pete Lyman - mastering
- Gary Dorsey & Kaysie Dorsey - art direction, artwork, photography

== Reception ==
Writing for Texas Music Pickers, Chris Fox concluded that the album is "true southern rock without trying to be – it’s authentic, which seems like such a hard thing for artists to accomplish these days." In his review for Louder Than War, Dave Jennings stated that the album "features a fine blend of country, blues, rock and touches of gospel and is evidence of a band that is clearly going places."
