= Whiskey Myers (album) =

Studio album by Whiskey Myers
- Released: September 27, 2019
- Genres: Southern rock; country; country rock
- Label: Wiggy Thump
- Producer: Whiskey Myers

Whiskey Myers chronology
Mud (2016)	Whiskey Myers (2019)	Tornillo (2022)

Whiskey Myers is the fifth album of the American rock band Whiskey Myers. It was released on September 27, 2019 via Wiggy Thump Records.

== Content ==
The album includes the single "Die Rockin", which lead singer Cody Cannon wrote with Ray Wylie Hubbard. It is also the first album to be produced entirely by the band.

Whiskey Myers debuted at number one on the Top Country Albums chart published for October 12, 2019, with 39,000 units sold in its first week.

== Commercial performance ==
Whiskey Myers debuted at No. 1 on Top Country Albums with 42,000 album equivalent units, 39,000 of which are in traditional album sales. The sales figure was boosted by a concert ticket/album tie-in offer for the band's 2019 tour. It has sold 47,900 copies in the United States as of March 2020.

== Critical reception ==
Writing for Nashville Lifestyles Magazine, music critic Luke Levenson praised the album, commenting, "In the case of Whiskey Myers, its creators returned to form, writing from the gut and playing from the heart. There's a noticeable touch of the band's rich music taste in the songs' production."

== Track listing ==
No.	Title	Writer(s)	Length
1.	"Die Rockin"	Cody Cannon, Ray Wylie Hubbard	3:24
2.	"Mona Lisa"	Cannon	2:26
3.	"Rolling Stone"	Cannon, Adam Hood	3:59
4.	"Bitch"	John Jeffers	2:50
5.	"Gasoline"	Cannon	3:59
6.	"Bury My Bones"	Jeffers, TJ McFarland	4:19
7.	"Glitter Ain’t Gold"	Jeffers	3:36
8.	"Houston County Sky"	Cannon	4:05
9.	"Little More Money"	Cannon	4:05
10.	"California to Caroline"	Cannon, Aaron Raitiere, Mark Stephen Jones	3:31
11.	"Kentucky Gold"	Cannon, Aaron Raitiere, Dave Kennedy	4:10
12.	"Running"	Cannon, Brent Cobb	5:27
13.	"Hammer"	Cannon	5:01
14.	"Bad Weather"	Jeffers	6:03

== Personnel ==
=== Whiskey Myers ===
- Cody Cannon – lead vocals, rhythm guitar
- John Jeffers – guitars, lead vocals, backing vocals, art direction
- Cody Tate – guitars, backing vocals
- Jamey Gleaves – bass
- Jeff Hogg – drums
- Tony Kent – percussion

=== Additional musicians ===
- Sean Giddings – organ
- Eddie Long – lap steel guitar
- Bennett Brown – fiddle
- Kristen Rogers – backing vocals
- Tony Martinez – backing vocals
- The McCrary Sisters – backing vocals

=== Production ===
- Whiskey Myers – producer
- Andrew Scheps – mixing
- Charles Godfrey – engineer
- Cody J. Simpson – assistant engineer
- Pete Lyman – mastering
- Zack Morris – photography
- Khris Poage – photography

== Charts ==
=== Weekly charts ===
Chart (2019)	Peak position
US Billboard 200	6
US Independent Albums (Billboard)	1
US Top Country Albums (Billboard)	1
US Top Rock Albums (Billboard)	2

=== Year-end charts ===
Chart (2019)	Position
US Top Country Albums (Billboard)	78
US Top Rock Albums (Billboard)	93
