= Broken Window Serenade =

2011 song by Whiskey Myers

Song by Whiskey Myers

from the album Firewater
- Released: April 26, 2011
- Genre: Southern rock; country rock
- Length: 5:46
- Label: Wiggy Thump Records
- Songwriter: Cody Cannon
- Producer: Leroy Powell

Music video
- "Broken Window Serenade" on YouTube

"Broken Window Serenade" is a song by American rock band Whiskey Myers. It was originally released as a part of their sophomore studio album Firewater (2011). Without having been released as a single, the song became their most popular to date after its resurgence on TikTok. It also appeared in the first season of American neo-Western drama television series Yellowstone in 2018.

== Background and composition ==
"Broken Window Serenade" was written by lead vocalist Cody Cannon and produced by Leroy Powell. The song is characterized by its stripped-down arrangement, featuring acoustic guitar and Cannon's gritty, emotive vocals. Lyrically, the track is a narrative of unrequited love, addiction, and tragic loss. It follows a narrator who watches a woman he loves spiral into depression and drug addiction. The "broken window" serves as a central metaphor for the narrator’s perspective; he initially sees her through a flawed lens, failing to realize she is "broken" until it is too late. The story concludes with the narrator attending her funeral, bringing "a couple of pretty flowers" as a final gesture of remembrance.

== In popular culture ==
In 2018, the song was featured in the Taylor Sheridan Paramount Network series Yellowstone. It was featured in the first season (Episode 8, "The Unravelling: Pt. 1"), during a scene in the ranch's bunkhouse. In 2025, the song became a viral phenomenon on social media platforms like TikTok, where it has been used in over 700,000 videos. This resurgence in popularity led to the song's first appearance on major music charts more than a decade after its original release.

== Charts ==
Chart (2026)	Peak position
Australia (ARIA)	27
Global 200 (Billboard)	135
Ireland (IRMA)	66
Sweden Heatseeker (Sverigetopplistan)	6
US Streaming Songs (Billboard)	18

== Certifications ==
Region	Certification	Certified units/sales
New Zealand (RMNZ)	Platinum	30,000^{‡}
United States (RIAA)	3× Platinum	3,000,000^{‡}
^{‡} Sales+streaming figures based on certification alone.
