= Fire & Water (Ecoutez Vos Murs) =

Studio album by Dave Greenfield and Jean-Jacques Burnel
- Released: 11 November 1983
- Studio: Spaceward Studios, Cambridge, UK
- Genre: New wave; synth-pop; ambient
- Length: 37:51
- Label: Epic
- Producer: Dave Greenfield; Jean-Jacques Burnel

Jean-Jacques Burnel chronology
Euroman Cometh (1979)	Fire & Water (Ecoutez Vos Murs) (1983)	Un Jour Parfait (1988)

Singles from Fire & Water
- 1. "Rain and Dole and Tea" Released: January 1984

Fire & Water (Ecoutez Vos Murs) is an album by Jean-Jacques Burnel and Dave Greenfield of the Stranglers, released on 11 November 1983 on the Epic record label. It is the soundtrack for the film Ecoutez Vos Murs, directed by Vincent Coudanne.

Burnel is reported to have said in 2011 that the film was shown once at a premiere screening in London, never to be seen again. The track "Rain and Dole and Tea" features Maggie Reilly, best known for her collaboration with the composer Mike Oldfield, on vocals, which in a remixed form was released as a single. The album spent one week at number 94 in the UK Albums Chart.

Fire & Water was reissued on CD by Edsel Records in April 2008, remastered from the original tapes. This features the remix of "Rain and Dole and Tea" as a bonus track.

== Background ==
In 1983, bassist Jean-Jacques Burnel and keyboardist Dave Greenfield were commissioned by French film director Vincent Coudanne to write music for his semi-animated art film Ecoutez Vos Murs (lit. 'Listen to Your Walls'). Their compositions would form the musical basis for the film, but the lyrics were written purely for the album. Maggie Reilly, an acquaintance of Burnel and Greenfield, was asked to perform lead vocals on the track "Rain and Dole and Tea". She recorded several harmony vocals, aiming for a 1960s girl group sound. The single version, however, omits the layered vocals.

The title of the instrumental "Trois Pedophiles pour Eric Sabyr" (lit. 'Three Pedophiles for Eric Sabyr') is an elaborate play on words. "Eric Sabyr" is a pun on French composer and pianist Erik Satie (1866 – 1925), a musical hero of Burnel's, who wrote three piano compositions called "Trois Gymnopédies." "Dino Rap" is dedicated to Stranglers security man Dino Rogers, of whom Burnel does an impersonation in the form of a rap on the track. In "Liberation", Dave Greenfield reads a short excerpt from Albert Einstein's Autobiographical Notes.

The French lyrics for "Detective Privée" were written by Dominique Buxin, lyricist for Belgian new wave band Polyphonic Size, with which Burnel worked as a producer in the first half of the 1980s.

== Critical reception ==
Professional ratings
Review scores
Source	Rating
The Great Rock Discography	4/10

In his review of the album in Strangled magazine, Chris Twomey didn't think it would be fair to judge Fire and Water on a "broad commercial level," as it fit more comfortably into an "experimental vein." Twomey felt, however, that the album "comes out way ahead of previous [Stranglers] solo projects in terms of accessibility and commerciality." Trouser Press described the album as "typical soundtrack ambience, relying on doomy keyboard effects, and songs, some with vocals." They concluded that "It's not heinously awful, but few are likely to give it repeated spins." Robert Endeacott, in his 2014 book Peaches: A Chronicle of The Stranglers 1974-1990, called it a good album that was "way above the average pap of the day."

== Track listing ==
All tracks are written by Dave Greenfield and Jean-Jacques Burnel, except where noted.

No.	Title	Lyrics	Length
1.	"Liberation" (semi-instrumental)		6:06
2.	"Rain and Dole and Tea"		4:10
3.	"Vladimir and Sergei" (^{a})		3:22
4.	"Le Soir" (instrumental)		4:54
5.	"Trois Pedophiles pour Eric Sabyr" (instrumental)		5:07
6.	"Dino Rap"		2:04
7.	"Nuclear Power (Yes Please)"		3:21
8.	"Detective Privée"	Dominique Buxin	4:45
9.	"Consequences" (instrumental)		4:30
Total length:			37:51

CD bonus track
No.	Title	Length
10.	"Rain and Dole and Tea" (single remix)	4:03
Total length:		41:54

- ^aSequel to the Stranglers' song "Vladimir and Olga", the B-side of "Midnight Summer Dream". The next parts are the tracks "Vladimir and the Beast" and "Vladimir Goes To Havana", both released as B-sides by the Stranglers.

== Personnel ==
Credits adapted from the album liner notes, except where noted.

Musicians

- Jean-Jacques Burnel – performer, vocals (3, 6–8)
- Dave Greenfield – performer, voice (1)
- Maggie Reilly – vocals (2)
- Anna von Stern – voice (2), backing vocals (6)

Technical

- Jean-Jacques Burnel – producer
- Dave Greenfield – producer
- Gary Lucas – engineer
- George Peckham – mastering (Portland Recording Studios, London, 29 September 1983)
- Paul Hardiman – remixing (10), mastering (10) (Advision Studios, London, 25 November 1983)
- David Jacob – mastering (10) (Advision Studios, London, 25 November 1983)

== Charts ==
Chart (1983)	Peak Position
UK Albums (OCC)	94
