= Jean-Jacques Burnel =

British bassist and singer (born 1952)

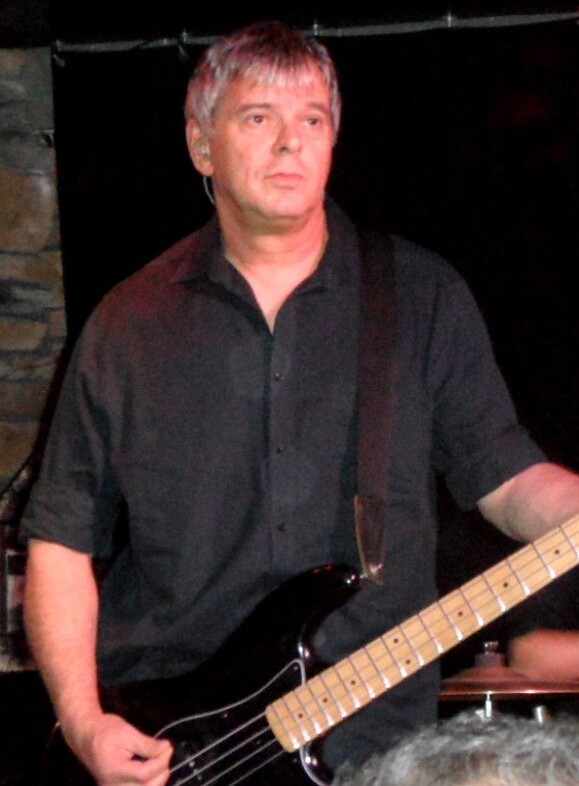
- Burnel performing with The Stranglers in 2013

Background information
- Born: 21 February 1952 (age 74); Notting Hill, London, England
- Origin: Guildford, England
- Genres: Rock; punk rock; new wave; post-punk; folk
- Occupations: Musician; record producer; songwriter
- Instruments: Bass guitar; vocals
- Years active: 1974–present
- Member of: The Stranglers

Jean-Jacques Burnel (born 21 February 1952) is an English musician, best known as the bass guitarist and co-lead vocalist with the punk rock band the Stranglers. He is the only original member to remain in the band.

== Life and career ==
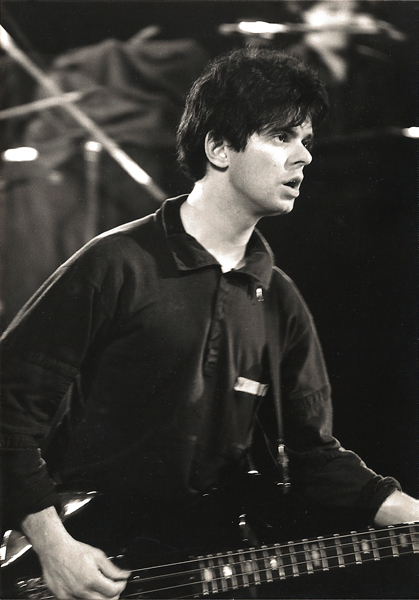
Burnel performing on French TV in 1983

Jean-Jacques Burnel was born in Notting Hill, London, to French parents. His family owned a restaurant where his father worked as a chef. As a child, as the son of French immigrants in Britain, he was often the victim of mockery from his schoolmates, which later led him to call himself John to disguise his French origins. This early encounter with xenophobia would also have an impact on his explosive temper in life and on stage as well as on the way he plays.

He moved with his parents to Godalming, Surrey, when he was 12 years old and attended the Royal Grammar School, Guildford, subsequently reading history at the University of Bradford and Huddersfield Polytechnic. Burnel originally trained as a classical guitarist, but adopted the bass guitar as his instrument within the Stranglers. He has provided lead vocals on nearly a third of the band's songs. Burnel later explained he often sang lyrics written by Hugh Cornwell (or vice versa) depending on "who had the best voice for that particular song".

Burnel has been a member of the Stranglers since the group's inception in 1974, but has also made two solo albums: Euroman Cometh in 1979, and Un Jour Parfait in 1988, as well as a collaborative album with fellow Stranglers member Dave Greenfield, Fire and Water (Ecoutez Vos Murs) in 1983. Burnel has also produced and appeared as a guest musician for a number of artists, such as Lizard and ARB from Japan, Polyphonic Size (from Belgium) and Taxi Girl's album Seppuku in 1981, as well as Laurent Sinclair's "Devant le Miroir" maxi single. Burnel also formed a rhythm and blues covers band, the Purple Helmets, who played a number of concerts and released two albums in the late 1980s.

As a holder of French citizenship, Burnel received his call-up papers for national service in France. He succeeded in avoiding it with a novel defence, arguing that his absence would damage the Stranglers as a band, and therefore the careers of the other members. This was in accordance with Burnel's claim that only the "bourgeois" would ever agree to serve their country's military.

Burnel composed and performed music for the anime Gankutsuou: The Count of Monte Cristo, including both the opening and ending themes, "We Were Lovers", and "You Won't See Me Coming" respectively.

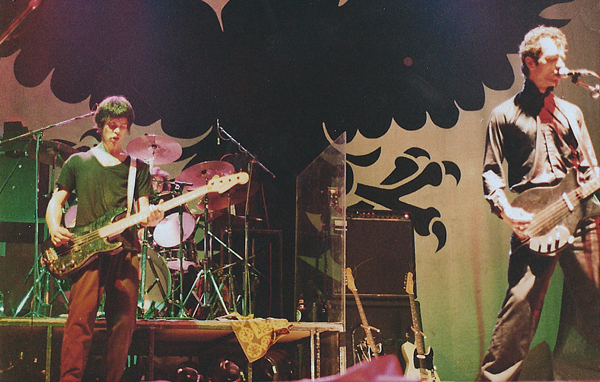
Burnel (left) performing in 1979 on The Raven tour with his Black Fender Precision

Burnel is fluent in French and writes many of his songs in the language.

== Equipment, sound, and influences ==
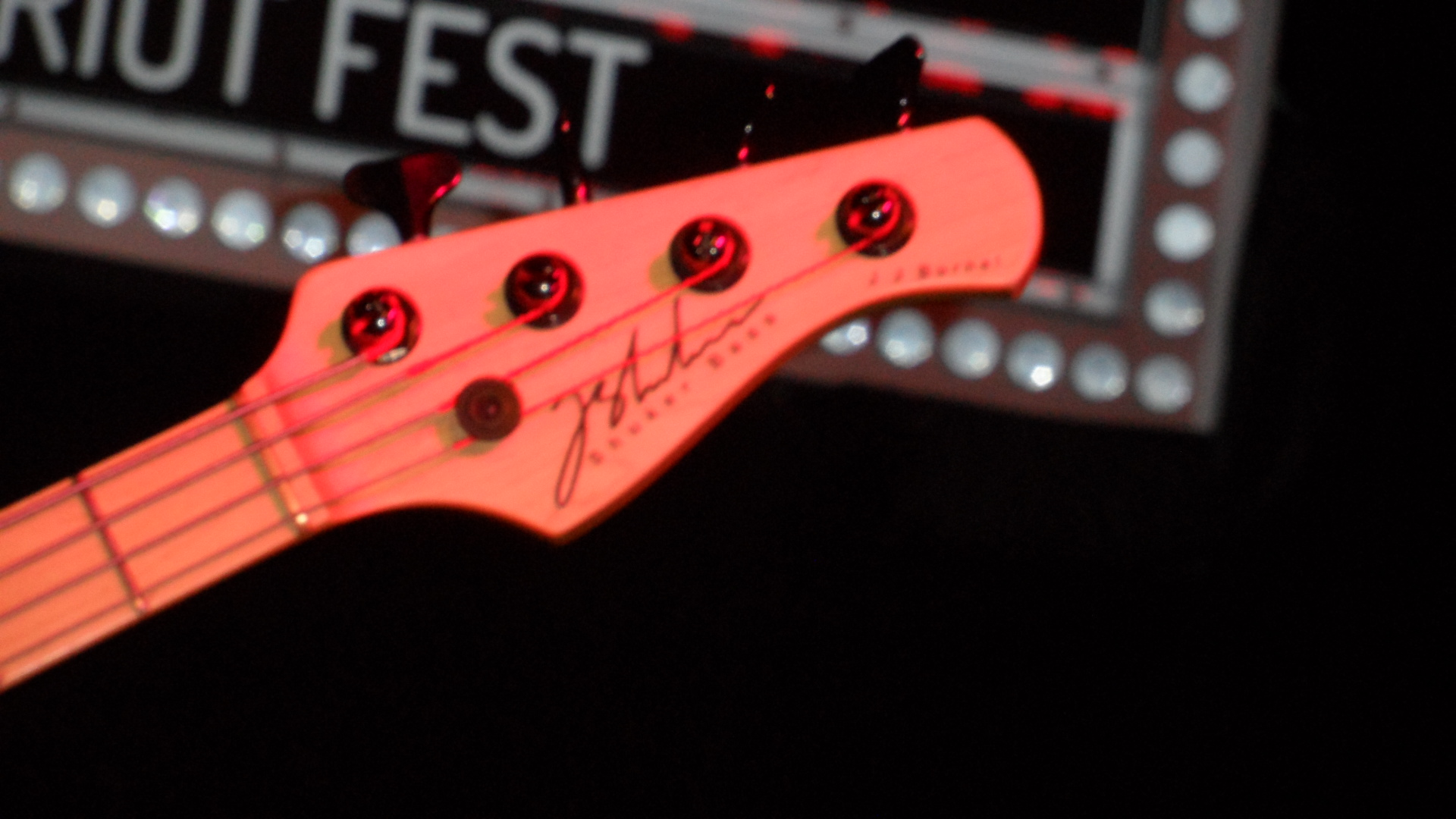
Shuker JJ Burnel signature bass headstock

Burnel is noted for his distinctive bass guitar sound and melodic bass lines. These are particularly prominent on earlier Stranglers recordings produced by Martin Rushent, such as the hit singles "No More Heroes" and "Peaches".

In the early days, Burnel's distinctive aggressive sound was created using a Fender Precision Bass with RotoSound roundwound strings played with a plectrum very close to the bridge, through Hiwatt all-valve amplification. However, the defining factor was the use of a Marshall 4x12 speaker cabinet in which the speaker cones were ripped, creating a distorted sound.

Later, he used a Yamaha BB2000 which he used on the Euroman Tour in 1979, he then used this full time between 1983 and 1985 before switching to a Steinberger L2 (headless) which he used from 1986 to 1989 and then reverted back to the Fender Precision bass for 10 Tour and continued using this until 2006. Since 2006, he has used Shuker JJ Burnel signature basses custom-built in England by Jon Shuker.

He was one of the first bass guitarists to use Trace Elliot amplification when the company began production in 1980. He now uses amplification by Ashdown Engineering which has honoured him with his own JJ500 signature amps.

He has cited Noel Redding, Andy Fraser, Jack Bruce, Jerry Scheff, John Entwistle, Ray Brown, Paul Chambers, and Harvey Brooks as influences.

== Personal life ==
As of 2015, Burnel was a seventh-degree black belt (nanadan) in Shidokan Karate and is head of Shidokan UK. He is also a motorcyclist and has owned many Triumph motorbikes.

== Discography ==
=== Albums ===
- Euroman Cometh (1979) No. 40 (UK Albums Chart)
- Fire and Water (Ecoutez Vos Murs) (with Dave Greenfield) (1983) No. 94 (UK Albums Chart)
- Un Jour Parfait (1988)
- Gankutsuou: The Count of Monte Cristo – Original Soundtrack (with Kasamatsu Kouji) (2005)

=== Singles ===
- "Freddie Laker (Concorde & Eurobus)" (1979), B-side "Ozymandias"
- "Girl from the Snow Country" (1981) deleted prior to release due to dispute with record label, but also released as a bootleg on "Karate Records".
- "Rain & Dole and Tea"/"Consequences" (1984) (with Dave Greenfield)
- "Goebbels, Mosley, God & Ingrams" (1988) flexi-disc release of an outtake from Euroman Cometh sessions
- "Le Whiskey"/"El Whiskey" (1988)
- "Reves"/"Crazy (She Drives Me)" (1988)

=== Production and other appearances ===
Burnel has also produced and or appeared either as a member of the group (Mutations, Purple Helmets) or as a 'guest' musician on a number of recordings, as follows:

- Celia and the Mutations – "Mony Mony / Mean to Me" single (1977) : bass and backing vocals
- Celia and the Mutations – "You Better Believe Me" single (1978) : bass
- Lizard – Lizard album (1979) : production, backing vocals
- Lizard – TV Magic single (1980) : production
- Polyphonic Size – "Nagasaki Mon Amour" single (1980) : production
- Sirens – "It Doesn't Really Matter" single (1980) : production
- Taxi Girl – "Les Armees de la Nuit" single (1981) : production & original theme
- Taxi Girl – "Vivian Vog" single (1981) : production
- Taxi Girl – "La Femme Ecarlate" single (1981) : production
- Taxi Girl – "Les Armées de la Nuit"/"Musée Tong"/"La Femme Ếcarlate" single (1981) : production
- Taxi Girl – Seppuku album (1981) : production, chorus vocals on UK bonus track "Find the Boy"
- Polyphonic Size – Live for Each Moment album (1982) : production, bass and backing vocals, lead vocals on two tracks, joint composer of one track
- Polyphonic Size – "Winston & Julia"/"Je T'ai Toujours Aimée"/"Parties Dance" single (1982) : production, lead vocals on all tracks, bass on "Je T'ai Toujours Aimée"
- Polyphonic Size – "Mother's Little Helper"/"Men and Construction"/"RDA RFA"/"Kyoto"/"Nagasaki Mon Amour" single (1982) : production
- Polyphonic Size – Mother's Little Helper"/"Girlscout"/"Men and Construction"/"On the Way to Medora"/"Saison" single (1982) : production
- Polyphonic Size – "Night is Coming On" single (1982) : production
- Polyphonic Size – "Je T'ai Toujours Aimee" single (1982) : production, lead vocals and bass on A-side
- Polyphonic Size – Walking Everywhere album (1983) : production, vocals on three tracks which he jointly composed, including lead vocals on Walking Class Hero.
- Polyphonic Size – "Walking Class Hero" single (1983) : production, lead vocal, joint composer
- ARB – Yellow Blood album (1984) : bass guitar on two tracks, "Yellow Blood" and "Fight it Out"
- Beranek – Trigger album (1984) : production, bass and backing vocals on track "All Through the Night"
- Beranek – "Some Boys Like Dolls"/"Why Don't You Wanna Dance" single (1984) : production
- Play Group – Love Goes Round album (1984) : production
- Laurent Sinclair – "Devant le Miroir" single (1985) : production and bass
- Dave Howard Singers – "Rock On" single (1985) : production
- Beranek – Daylight in the Dark album (1986) : production, bass and backing vocals
- Beranek – "Dancing in the Wind"/"Teardrop" single (1986) : production, bass and backing vocals
- Ping Pop – Just Another Lazy Day album (1986) : production and backing vocals
- Fools Dance – "They'll Never Know" single (1987) : bass
- Jacques Dutronc – CQFD album (1987) : bass on five of the tracks
- Mona Mur – Mona Mur album (1987) : production, bass, guitars and percussion
- Mona Mur – "Bastard" single (1987) : production, bass, guitars and percussion
- Mona Mur – "Ritz" single (1987) : production, bass, guitars, percussion
- Revenge – Sweet and Sour album (1987) : production, sound mixing and recording, backing vocals
- Revenge – Wartime album (1987) : mixing
- The Purple Helmets – Ride Again album (1988) : bass and vocals
- The Purple Helmets – "We Gotta Get Out of This Place"/"I'm a Man" single (1989) : bass and vocals
- The Purple Helmets – Rise Again album (1989) : bass and vocals
- The Purple Helmets – "Brand New Cadillac"/"Under the Sun" single (1989) : bass and vocals
- Dani – N Comme Never Again album (1993) : production, mixing, bass, vocals and guitars
- Magic De Spell – Holiday in Sarajevo album (1993) : production
- Magic De Spell – Nipsonanoimimata Mi Monan Opsin album (1995) : production
- Pat Dinizio – Songs and Sounds album (1997) : bass and vocals
- Pat Dinizio – "124mph" single (1997) : bass and vocals
- Pat Dinizio – "A World Apart" single (1997) : bass and vocals
- Schindler – "Time" single (1999) : production, keyboards and backing vocals
- Temple of Sound - "Dojo kun (jamais laisser tomber)" on the album First edition (2002) : vocals
- 3 Men and Black – Acoustic album (2004) : bass and vocals
- Teasing Lulu – "Infatuation"/"You Ain't My Baby" single (2006) : production
- Teasing Lulu – "Waste of Time"/"The Ex Factor" (from the motion picture Reverb) single (2007) : production
- Teasing Lulu – Black Summer album (2008) : production
- Dani - "Me & you" on the album Le Paris de Dani (2010) : vocals, song written by Burnel
