= Mud (Whiskey Myers album) =

Studio album by Whiskey Myers
- Released: 9 September 2016 (US)
- Genres: Southern rock; country rock
- Length: 38:47
- Label: Wiggy Thump Records
- Producer: Dave Cobb

Whiskey Myers chronology
Early Morning Shakes (2014)	Mud (2016)	Whiskey Myers (2019)

Mud is the fourth studio album by American rock band Whiskey Myers. It was released on September 9, 2016, through Wiggy Thump Records in the United States.

== Track listing ==
No.	Title	Writer(s)	Length
1.	"On the River"	John Jeffers	3:54
2.	"Mud"	Cody Cannon, Brent Cobb	4:11
3.	"Lightning Bugs and Rain"	Cannon, Mark Stephen Jones, Aaron Ratiere	3:11
4.	"Deep Down in the South"	Cannon	3:21
5.	"Stone"	Cannon	5:35
6.	"Trailer We Call Home"	Cannon, Darrell Scott	3:39
7.	"Some of Your Love"	Cannon, Adam Hood, Jeffers	3:23
8.	"Frogman"	Cannon, Rich Robinson	3:38
9.	"Hank"	Cannon	3:58
10.	"Good Ol' Days"	Cobb	3:57

== Personnel ==
=== Whiskey Myers ===
- Cody Cannon - lead vocals, rhythm guitar
- John Jeffers - guitars, vocals
- Cody Tate - guitars, vocals
- Gary Brown - bass
- Jeff Hogg - drums, percussion
- Tony Kent - percussion

=== Additional musicians ===
- Jon Knudson - dobro, fiddle, Hammond B3, mandolin, piano, vocals
- Jim Hoke - horns
- Kristen Rogers - backing vocals

=== Production ===
- Dave Cobb - producer
- Shane Stern - production coordination
- Eddie Spear - engineer
- Pete Lyman - mastering

== Reception ==
Writing for PopMatters, Jasper Bruce concluded that the album is "a clear affirmation of Whiskey Myers’ place amongst the pre-eminent country acts of the millennial generation." In his review for Classic Rock, Paul Lester gave Mud three and a half stars (out of five). The Austin Chronicle panned the album writing that the band is at its best when it "channel[s] deep soul roots" but that "sadly, those moments are few and far between."
