= Tornillo (album) =

Studio album by Whiskey Myers
- Released: July 29, 2022
- Recorded: 2021
- Studios: Sonic Ranch, Tornillo, Texas
- Genre: Southern rock
- Length: 51:37
- Label: Wiggy Thump
- Producer: Whiskey Myers

Whiskey Myers chronology
Whiskey Myers (2019)	Tornillo (2022)

Singles from Tornillo
- 1. "Tornillo" Released: February 18, 2022; 2. "John Wayne" Released: February 18, 2022; 3. "The Wolf" Released: December 6, 2022

Tornillo is the sixth album by American rock band Whiskey Myers. It was released on July 29, 2022, via Wiggy Thump Records with distribution by Thirty Tigers. The first two songs, "Tornillo" and "John Wayne" were released on February 18, 2022.

== Content ==
Singer Cody Cannon wrote or co-wrote nine of the twelve songs on Tornillo, with the others being credited to guitarist John Jeffers. Cannon stated that the album is "going to have a little bit different sound" and "it's still Whiskey Myers at its core, but it's kind of fresh... We did a lot of bass and horns on this one, which is something we’ve always wanted to do."

== Track listing ==
Tornillo track listing
No.	Title	Writer(s)	Length
1.	"Tornillo" (instrumental)	Cody Cannon	0:47
2.	"John Wayne"	Cannon; Jamey Gleaves; Tony Kent	4:55
3.	"Antioch"	Cannon	4:05
4.	"Feet's"	Cannon	4:34
5.	"Whole World Gone Crazy"	John Jeffers	3:04
6.	"For the Kids"	Cannon	5:38
7.	"The Wolf"	Cannon	5:37
8.	"Mission to Mars"	Cannon; Aaron Raitiere	3:50
9.	"Bad Medicine"	Cannon	5:12
10.	"Heavy on Me"	Jeffers	4:37
11.	"Other Side"	Cannon	4:47
12.	"Heart of Stone"	Cannon	4:25
Total length:			51:37

== Charts ==
Chart performance for Tornillo
Chart (2022)	Peak position
Australian Digital Albums (ARIA)	16
German Albums (Offizielle Top 100)	38
Scottish Albums (Official Charts)	11
Swiss Albums (Schweizer Hitparade)	16
UK Country Albums (Official Charts)	1
UK Album Downloads (Official Charts)	20
UK Independent Albums (Official Charts)	6
US Billboard 200	67
US Independent Albums (Billboard)	10
US Top Country Albums (Billboard)	10
US Top Rock Albums (Billboard)	14
