= Whiskey Myers =

American rock band

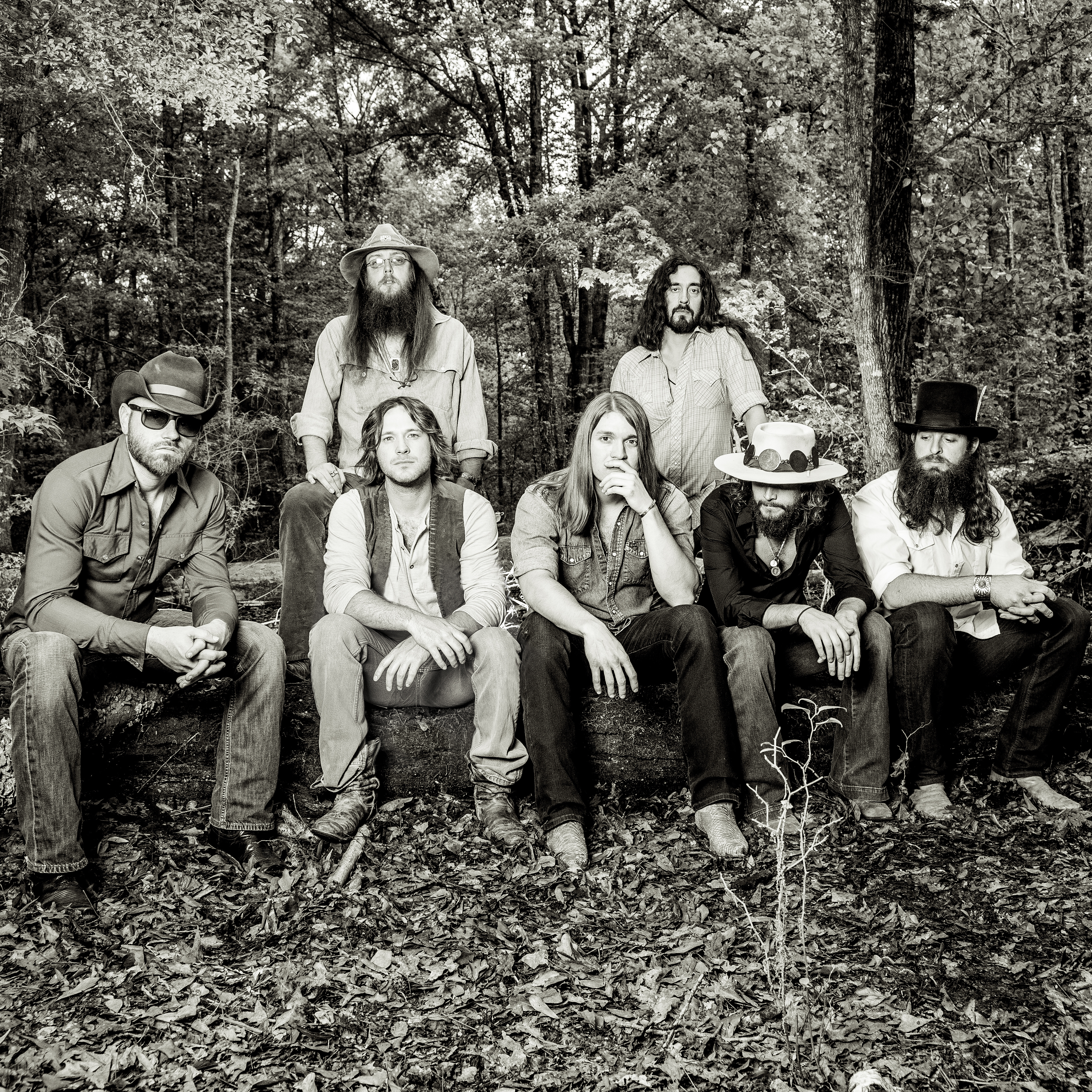
- Whiskey Myers in 2016

Background information
- Origin: East Texas
- Genres: Southern rock; country rock; hard rock; country
- Years active: 2007–present
- Label: Wiggy Thump Records
- Members: Cody Cannon; Cody Tate; John Jeffers; Jeff Hogg; Tony Kent; Jamey Gleaves
- Past members: Gary Brown
- Website: www.whiskeymyers.com

Whiskey Myers is an American rock band from Palestine, Texas composed of Cody Cannon (lead vocals and acoustic guitar), John Jeffers (lead guitar, slide guitar, lap steel guitar, vocals), Cody Tate (lead and rhythm guitar, vocals), Jeff Hogg (drums), Tony Kent (percussion/drums), and Jamey Gleaves (bass). They have released seven albums, the latest being Whomp Whack Thunder released in September 2025.

== Music career ==
In 2008, the band released their debut album, Road of Life. Their second album, Firewater, was released by Wiggy Thump in 2011 and debuted in the Top 30 on the Billboard Top Country Albums chart, largely thanks to the single "Ballad of a Southern Man". On February 4, 2014, the album, Early Morning Shakes, was released and received mostly positive reviews. In September 2016, their fourth album Mud was released. The band's self-titled album was released on September 27, 2019, followed by "Tornillo" on July 29, 2022.

The band started when friends Cody Cannon and John Jeffers began learning guitar together, inspired by the music of Lynyrd Skynyrd, Hank Williams Jr., Waylon Jennings, amongst many other artists. After being joined by Cannon's co-worker and friend Cody Tate, and playing together for a while, the three decided to start a more serious band. They enlisted friend Jeff Hogg to play drums, and asked Cannon's cousin Gary Brown to play bass (although he did not know how to play the instrument at the time). They began playing shows around their hometown and native state of Texas, slowly starting to build a following on the Texas/Red Dirt scene.

In 2018, the band was featured in four episodes of the Taylor Sheridan Paramount Network series Yellowstone. Shortly afterwards, the band's three available albums moved into the top 10 iTunes country chart. Their most recent album at the time, Mud, reached No. 1 on the charts, and its song "Stone" reached No. 9 in all genres.

On September 27, 2019, the band released the self-titled album, Whiskey Myers. It debuted at No. 1 on Billboard Country, No. 2 on Billboard active rock, and No. 6 on the Billboard 200.

== Band members ==
=== Current members ===
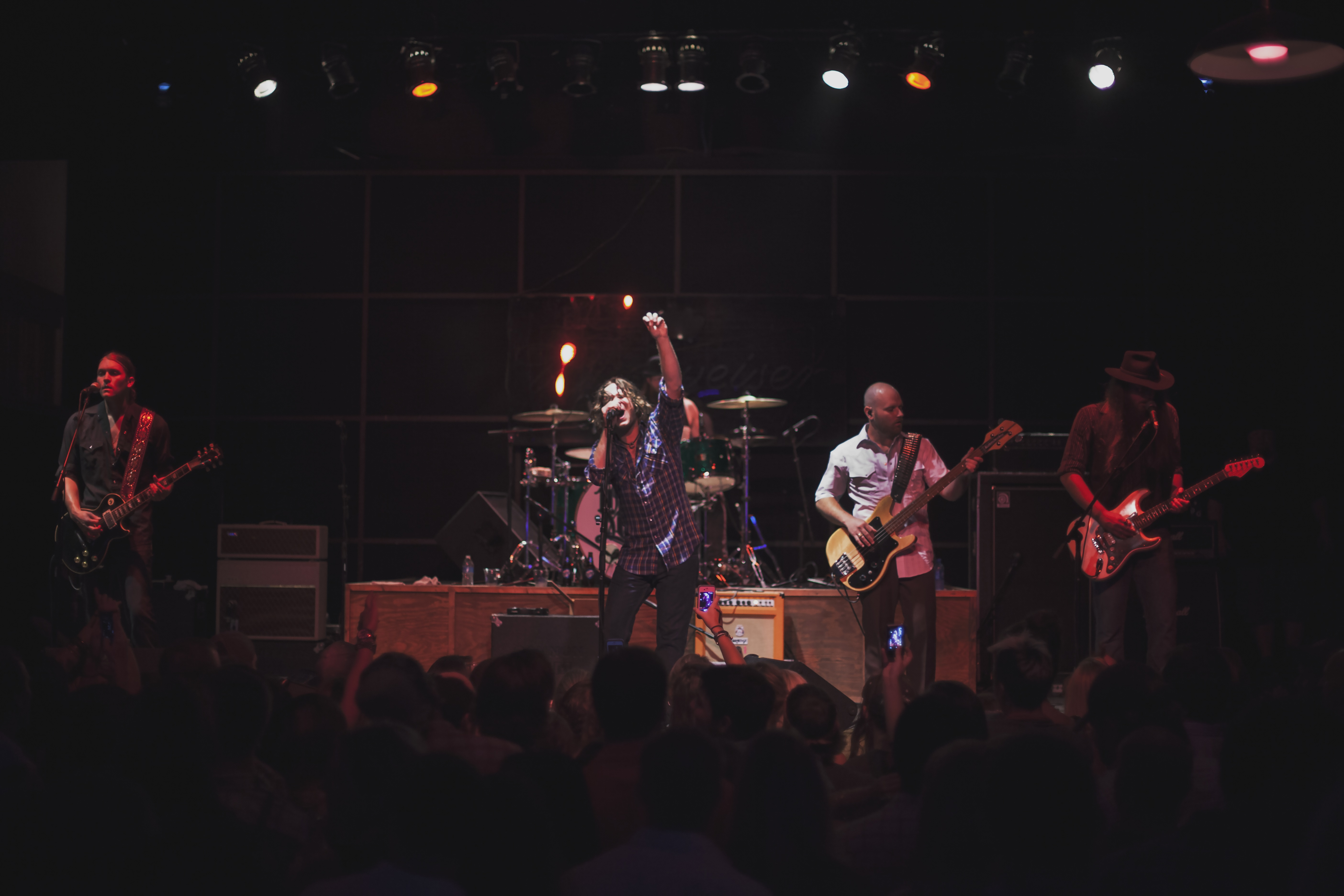
Whiskey Myers live in 2013

- Cody Cannon – lead vocals, guitar, harmonica (2007–present)
- John Jeffers – guitar, slide guitar, lap steel, vocals (2007–present)
- Cody Tate – guitar, rhythm guitar, vocals (2007–present)
- Jeff Hogg – drums (2007–present)
- Tony Kent – keyboards, percussion (2016–present)
- Jamey Gleaves – bass guitar (2017–present)

=== Former members ===
- Gary Brown – bass guitar (2007–2017)

== Discography ==
=== Studio albums ===
Title	Album details	Peak chart positions					Sales	Certifications
Title	Album details	US Country	US	US Heat	US Indie	US Rock	Sales	Certifications
Road of Life	Release date: July 15, 2008; Label: Smith Entertainment	—	—	—	—	—		
Firewater	Release date: April 26, 2011; Label: Wiggy Thump	26	198	4	39	—		RIAA: Platinum
Early Morning Shakes	Release date: February 4, 2014; Label: Wiggy Thump	10	54	—	12	—		
Mud	Release date: September 9, 2016; Label: Wiggy Thump	4	80	—	12	17	US: 8,600	
Whiskey Myers	Release date: September 27, 2019; Label: Wiggy Thump	1	6	—	1	2	US: 47,900	
Tornillo	Release date: July 29, 2022; Label: Wiggy Thump	10	67	—	10	14		
Whomp Whack Thunder	Release date: September 26, 2025; Label: Neon Cross Studio	—	—	—	—	—		
"—" denotes releases that did not chart

=== Singles ===
Year	Title	Peak chart positions				Certifications	Album
Year	Title	US Country Digi.	US Digi.	US Main.	US Rock Digi.	Certifications	Album
2007	"Lonely East Texas Nights"	—	—	—	—	RIAA: Platinum	non-album single
2011	"Ballad of a Southern Man"	—	—	—	—	RIAA: Platinum	Firewater
2013	"Virginia"	—	—	—	—	RIAA: Platinum	Firewater
2013	"Home"	—	—	—	—		Early Morning Shakes
2014	"Dogwood"	—	—	—	—		Early Morning Shakes
2016	"Stone"	13	44	—	—	RIAA: 2× Platinum; RMNZ: Gold	Mud
2019	"Gasoline"	—	—	20	—		Whiskey Myers
2019	"Bury My Bones"	—	—	—	16	RIAA: Platinum	Whiskey Myers
2020	"Die Rockin"	—	—	45	—		Whiskey Myers
2022	"Tornillo"	—	—	—	—		Tornillo
2022	"John Wayne"	21	—	—	15		Tornillo
2022	"The Wolf"	—	—	—	—		Tornillo
2025	"Time Bomb"	—	—	34	—		Whomp Whack Thunder
2025	"Tailspin"	—	—	—	—		Whomp Whack Thunder

=== Other charted and certified songs ===
Year	Title	Peak chart positions			Certifications	Album
Year	Title	AUS	IRE	WW	Certifications	Album
2011	"Bar, Guitar and a Honky Tonk Crowd"	—	—	—	RIAA: Gold	Firewater
2011	"Broken Window Serenade"	27	66	135	RIAA: 3× Platinum; RMNZ: Platinum	Firewater
2014	"Reckoning"	—	—	—	RIAA: Gold	Early Morning Shakes
2016	"Trailer We Call Home"	—	—	—	RIAA: Gold	Mud

=== Music videos ===
Year	Video	Director
2011	"Ballad of a Southern Man"	Mason Dixon
2012	"Anna Marie"	Matt Bizer
2013	"Virginia"	Phillip Guzman
2013	"Home"	Jeff Ray
2014	"Dogwood"	Phillip Guzman
2016	"Frogman"	
2018	"Stone"	
2019	"Die Rockin"	Zack Morris
2019	"Bitch"	Khris Poage
2019	"Gasoline"	Zack Morris
2020	"Bury My Bones"	Evan Kaufmann
2022	"John Wayne"	Nayip
2025	"Tailspin"	Khris Poage
