= Fire and Water (sculpture) =

Artwork by John Luttropp

- Artist: John Luttropp
- Year: 1988
- Type: concrete, brick, neon, plexiglass
- Location: Milwaukee, Wisconsin; 43.02861°N 88.017009°W
- Owner: City of Milwaukee

Fire and Water is a public art work by American artist John Luttropp, located on the southwest side of Milwaukee, Wisconsin. The multi-element architectural sculpture was created for the entrance of the Milwaukee Fire Department Engine Company #25 station. It is located at 300 S. 84th St.

== Description ==
The sculpture includes two primary elements: a pair of neon-topped tapering concrete walls flanking the entry sidewalk, and a wall-mounted neon sign displaying the number 25 in a stylized font. During the day, the neon is not lit. At night, the entry numbers glow red, and the tops of the tapering wall glow blue. According to the Smithsonian Institution's Save Outdoor Sculpture! survey, the red neon symbolizes fire and the blue neon symbolizes water spray from fire hoses.

== Historical information ==
The City of Milwaukee commissioned the work for $9,000 and it was greeted with some criticism. The Milwaukee Sentinel compared the neon look to a fast food restaurant and quoted hesitant firefighters based at the station.
