= Firewater (Whiskey Myers album) =

Studio album by Whiskey Myers
- Released: April 26, 2011
- Recorded: 2011
- Studios: Panhandle House Studios, Denton, Texas; U.S.
- Genres: Southern rock; hard rock; country rock
- Length: 55:56
- Label: Wiggy Thump
- Producer: Leroy Powell

Whiskey Myers chronology
Road of Life (2008)	Firewater (2011)	Early Morning Shakes (2014)

Professional ratings
Review scores
Source	Rating
AllMusic	2.5/5 stars

Firewater is the second studio album by American rock band Whiskey Myers. It was released on April 26, 2011, through Wiggy Thump Records in the United States.

== Track listing ==
No.	Title	Writer(s)	Length
1.	"Bar, Guitar and a Honky Tonk Crowd"	Brent Cobb	3:17
2.	"Guitar Picker"	Cody Cannon	3:28
3.	"Ballad of a Southern Man"	Gary Brown, Cannon, John Jeffers, Leroy Powell, Cody Tate	3:40
4.	"Calm Before the Storm"	Cannon, Jeffers, Tate	5:39
5.	"Broken Window Serenade"	Cannon	5:46
6.	"Different Mold"	Tate	5:22
7.	"Turn It Up"	Powell, Mando Saenz	3:24
8.	"Virginia"	Cannon	4:20
9.	"Anna Marie"	Cannon, Jeffers	3:37
10.	"How Far"	Gary Nicholson, Powell	3:07
11.	"Strange Dreams"	Cannon	6:12
12.	"Song for You"	Tate	8:00

== Personnel ==
=== Musicians ===
- Cody Cannon - lead vocals, rhythm guitar, harp, percussion
- Cody Tate - guitar, vocals, percussion
- John Jeffers - guitar, vocals, percussion
- Gary Brown - bass, vocals, percussion
- Jeff Hogg - drums, percussion

=== Additional musicians ===
- Leroy Powell - vocals, pedal steel, guitar, organ, magic spoons, percussion

=== Production ===
- Leroy Powell - producer
- Eric Herbst - engineer
- Ray Kennedy - mastering
- Dean Tomasek - artwork design
- James Hertless - photography

== Charts ==
Chart (2011–2026)	Peak position
US Billboard 200	198
US Americana/Folk Albums (Billboard)	16
US Top Country Albums (Billboard)	26
US Heatseekers Albums (Billboard)	4
US Independent Albums (Billboard)	29

== Certifications ==
Region	Certification	Certified units/sales
United States (RIAA)	Platinum	1,000,000^{‡}
^{‡} Sales+streaming figures based on certification alone.
