= Taxi Girl =

French band

- Origin: France
- Genres: New wave, pop, alternative rock
- Years active: 1978–1986
- Labels: Mankin; Virgin
- Past members: Daniel Darc; Mirwais; Laurent Sinclair; Pierre Wolfsohn; Stéphane Erard; Pascal; Phillipe Mongne
- Website: Taxi Girl Official Site

Taxi Girl were a French new wave band, adopting the New Romantic aesthetics of the time, such as clashing red and black clothing, synthesizer-led songs, and taking influence from mythology and literature. The group existed between 1978 and 1986, producing 5 mini-albums, and one full-length album, Seppuku. Their early success is attributed to two singles, "Mannequin" in 1979 and "Cherchez le garçon" in 1980.

Taxi Girl's music drew from the energy of Iggy and the Stooges, the retro-futuristic soundscapes of Kraftwerk, and the dark romanticism of Joy Division, Orchestral Manoeuvres in the Dark and the Stranglers. Their most successful album was Seppuku (1982), produced by Jean-Jacques Burnel of the Stranglers; Jet Black, the drummer of that group, provided percussion, stepping in after the death of Pierre Wolfsohn. Taxi Girl also toured the UK in 1981, providing support to the Stranglers on their La Folie tour.

After disagreements about how the band should develop musically, Laurent Sinclair left the group in 1983, to pursue a solo career. Daniel Darc and Mirwais continued under the Taxi Girl name, releasing singles such as "Paris" and "Aussi Belle Qu'Une Balle", until 1986 when they disbanded. In 1985, they contributed a cover of "Stephanie Says" for a Velvet Underground tribute album Les Enfants du Velvet.

Since then, Daniel Darc released several solo albums under his own name. Mirwais collaborated with the group 'Juliette Et Les Indépendants', before being discovered by Madonna in the late 1990s. He then produced her albums Music and American Life, and part of Confession On The Dancefloor, as well as releasing his own solo album Production.

Darc died, at the age of 53, on 28 February 2013. Six years later, on 2 September 2019, Laurent Sinclair, the band's keyboardist and co-composer, died at the age of 58.

== Members ==
- Daniel Darc – Vocals (1978–1986) (died 2013)
- Mirwais – Guitar (1978–1986)
- Laurent Sinclair – Keyboards (1978–1983) (died 2019)
- Pierre Wolfsohn – Percussion (1978–1981) (died 1981)
- Stéphane Erard – Bass (1978–1980)
- Pascal Geneix – Guitar (1978)
- Phillipe Le Mongne – Bass (1983–1986)

== Discography ==
=== Albums ===
- Cherchez le garçon (1980)
- Seppuku (1982)
- Seppuku UK version, with vocals in English and an additional track (1982)
- Quelqu'un comme toi – Mini Album (1983)
- Quelque part dans Paris (live) (1990)
- 84-86 (Compilation) (1990)

=== Singles – 7" ===
- "Mannequin" (1980)
- "Cherchez le garçon" (1980)
- "Jardin Chinois" (1981)
- "Les armées de la nuit" (1981)
- "La femme écarlate" (1981)
- "Viviane Vog" – flexi live Manchester 1981 Stranglers (1981)
- "Quelqu'un comme toi" (1983)
- "Dites-le fort" + A4 Biography (1984)
- "Paris" (1984)
- "Aussi belle qu'une balle" (1986)

=== Singles – 12" ===
- "Man'quin" (1979)
- "Cherchez le garçon" (1980)
- "Les armées de la nuit" (1981)
- "Quelqu'un comme toi" (1983)
- "Nous sommes jeunes, nous sommes fiers" (1984)
- "Paris" (1984)
- "Aussi belle qu'une balle" (1986)
- "Cherchez le garçon – 4 remixes" (1995)
