= Gankutsuou: The Count of Monte Cristo =

Japanese anime television series

- Promotional image for the series, featuring the titular Count (above) and Albert de Morcerf (below)

巌窟王 (Gankutsuō)
- Genre: Science fiction
- Created by: Alexandre Dumas (Note: Written in collaboration with Auguste Maquet.) (original work); Mahiro Maeda (original plan)
- Anime television series
- Directed by: Mahiro Maeda
- Produced by: Naomi Nishiguchi; Taichi Hashimoto; Minako Doi; Osamu Andō
- Written by: Shūichi Kōyama
- Music by: Jean-Jacques Burnel
- Studio: Gonzo
- Licensed by: Crunchyroll (Note: In North America through Crunchyroll, LLC (formerly known as Funimation).); AUS: Madman Entertainment; SEA: Odex; UK: Anime Limited
- Original network: TV Asahi
- English network: IN: Animax; PH: Hero; SEA: Animax; US: ImaginAsian TV, Funimation Channel
- Original run: October 6, 2004 – March 30, 2005
- Episodes: 24
- Manga
- Written by: Mahiro Maeda
- Published by: Kodansha
- English publisher: NA: Del Rey Manga
- Imprint: Afternoon KC
- Magazine: Monthly Afternoon
- Original run: March 25, 2005 – March 25, 2008
- Volumes: 3
- icon

Gankutsuou: The Count of Monte Cristo (Note: Known in Japan as just Gankutsuou (Japanese: 巌窟王, Hepburn: Gankutsuō; lit. King of the Cavern)) is a Japanese anime television series produced by Gonzo. It is a science fiction adaptation of the 1844 novel The Count of Monte Cristo by Alexandre Dumas. The 24-episode series aired on Japanese television between October 2004 and March 2005. It was licensed for a Western release first by Geneon Entertainment and later by Funimation. The series was adapted into a CD drama, a trilogy of novels by screenwriter Shuichi Kouyama, and a manga series written and drawn by series creator Mahiro Maeda, with additional story elements written by Yura Ariwara which ran from 2005 to 2008.

Set in the year 5053, the series focuses on the impact of the titular Count: formerly a sailor named Edmund Dantes, he was betrayed by his friends and imprisoned on false charges. Aided by a mysterious force dubbed "Gankutsuou", Dantes escaped and refashioned himself as the Count, determined to exact vengeance on those who wronged him. The series is mainly told from the perspective of Viscount Albert de Morcerf, the teenage son of one of the Count's enemies. While the series adapts much of the original storyline and carries over its theme of revenge, the plot and characters feature multiple differences.

Originally intended as an adaptation of The Stars My Destination by Alfred Bester, the copyright holders' refusal to allow an adaptation led Maeda to instead use Dumas's novel, which had parallel themes to Bester's story. Maeda created the story and characters, collaborating on the former with Kouyama and the latter's designs with artist Hidenori Matsubara. The anime's artstyle blended Western Impressionism and Japanese Ukiyo-e styles. Fashion designer Anna Sui collaborated on costume designs. Original music was co-composed by Jean-Jacques Burnel of British band The Stranglers, who also composed and sang the main themes. The series was praised by critics and received multiple accolades.

== Synopsis ==
Gankutsuou: The Count of Monte Cristo is set in the year 5053; the two major powers are the planet Earth and the alien-dominated Eastern Empire, who have been at war for an undetermined time. During a visit to the Moon-based city of Lune with his childhood friend Baron Franz d'Épinay, Viscount Albert de Morcerf meets a mysterious self-made nobleman called the Count of Monte Cristo. After the Count helps Franz save Albert from a gang of kidnappers, Albert introduces the Count into the high society of Paris. This includes Albert's father General Fernand de Morcerf and his wife Mercedes; the powerful banker Baron Jullian Danglars, his wife Victoria, and their daughter and Albert's betrothed Eugénie; and the Crown Prosecutor of Paris Gérard de Villefort, his current wife Héloïse, and his first wife's daughter Valentine. Albert later meets the Count's alien companion Haydée and the Marquis Andrea Cavalcanti, a flamboyant nobleman who quickly replaces Albert as Eugénie's fiancée through the Count's influence.

During the course of the story, the Count is revealed to be Edmund Dantes, a former sailor and Mercedes's first love. Twenty years before, he was falsely implicated in a murder by his assumed friends Danglars and Fernand—Danglars due to his hatred of Edmund's honesty, and Fernand to win Mercedes's hand. Edmund is then imprisoned in the Château d'If by Villefort, who sought to protect himself from an associated political conspiracy. With the aid of Gankutsuou, an alien being lurking in the d'If, Edmund escaped and refashioned himself as the Count, committing himself to revenge against those who wronged him and orchestrating Albert's kidnapping to ingratiate himself with Parisian society.

The Count's revenge against his enemies spans multiple fronts. With Danglars, the Count manipulates events to bankrupt him, then later confronts him when he tries to escape his creditors; after revealing his identity, the Count leaves Danglars adrift in space. This event is compounded by the exposing of Andrea as a fraud and murderer, having been set up by the Count as royalty as part of his revenge. Albert helps Eugénie escape Paris, with the two admitting their love for each other. With Villefort, the Count first arranges for Héloïse to poison Valentine, of whom she is jealous. Valentine is saved and removed to Marseilles by her soldier lover Maximilien Morrel with Franz's help. The Count then arranges for Héloïse to poison herself, driving her insane. Villefort attacks the Count and is put on trial. Appearing as a witness, Andrea reveals himself as the illegitimate son of Villefort and Victoria, then poisons Villefort as revenge for his abandonment. The poison drives Villefort insane just after the Count reveals his motives.

Alongside these events, the Count ruins Fernand's name with help from Haydée, whose family was framed and murdered by Fernand as allies of the Eastern Empire, and who was sold into slavery. Albert challenges the Count to a duel for his family's honor, but Franz takes his place and is killed; in the process, Franz inflicts a fatal wound to the Count, who is kept alive by Gankutsuou. Fernand rallies his forces for a coup d'état in Paris, which results in the city being damaged, Andrea escaping prison and Villefort being killed during the ensuing chaos; Fernand's aim is to take over the Earth government and wage fresh war against the Eastern Empire. When Albert and Mercedes try to reason with Fernand after they learn the truth, he injures them and confronts the Count, resulting in a stand-off where Fernand holds Haydée hostage. The Count becomes completely possessed by Gankutsuou and attempts to murder Albert, but Albert manages to banish Gankutsuou; and free from its control, Edmund dies. Albert, Mercedes and Haydée escape, while Fernand commits suicide in an act of redemption. Five years later, peace is being established between Earth and the Eastern Empire. Haydée assumes her place as queen of her world; Maximilien leaves the army to live with Valentine; Mercedes is at peace, though mourning Edmund and Fernand's deaths; and Albert, having rebuilt his life, reunites with Eugénie.

== Voice cast ==
Character	Japanese voice cast	English voice cast
Count of Monte Cristo/Edmund Dantes	Jouji Nakata	Jamieson Price
Albert de Morcerf	Jun Fukuyama, Aya Endō (child)	Johnny Yong Bosch, Wendee Lee (child)
Haydée	Akiko Yajima	Stephanie Sheh
Franz d'Épinay	Daisuke Hirakawa, Tomoe Hanba (child)	Ezra Weisz, Melissa Fahn (child)
Fernand de Morcerf	Jūrōta Kosugi	Paul St. Peter
Mercedes de Morcerf	Kikuko Inoue	Karen Strassman
Baron Jullian Danglars	Shinpachi Tsuji	Doug Stone
Victoria Danglars	Naoko Matsui	Mari Devon
Eugénie Danglars	Chie Nakamura	Michelle Ruff
Gérard de Villefort	Yōsuke Akimoto	Tom Wyner
Héloïse de Villefort	Kumiko Watanabe	Julie Ann Taylor
Valentine de Villefort	Junko Miura	Dorothy Elias-Fahn
Maximilien Morrel	Tetsu Inada	Tony Oliver
Lucien Debray	Jin Domon	Doug Erholtz
Andrea Cavalcanti	Tomokazu Seki	Liam O'Brien

== Themes ==
The anime is a science fiction adaptation of The Count of Monte Cristo, a French adventure novel written by Alexandre Dumas in collaboration with his regular partner Auguste Maquet, beginning as a newspaper serial in 1844. The Count of Monte Cristo is considered a literary classic, and in the years since its publication has received numerous adaptations. According to series creator Mahiro Maeda, while the theme of revenge is retained, the original story's Christian elements—including the concepts of forgiveness and divine retribution—were cut out to make the story more accessible to the audience. He also believed the Count would not have enacted his revenge in the face of these Christian themes. As a consequence, the anime's central theme became how the cast's actions are influenced by their emotions.

The anime's ending differs from the novel, particularly with the involvement of Albert and the Count's eventual fate. While Albert is initially a pawn in the Count's schemes as in Dumas's original story, Maeda says that the Count slowly begins to see his old self in Albert's pure and trusting nature, but is still driven by his need for revenge. In the end, the Count is possessed by Gankutsuou and overtaken by their combined lust for revenge when he realizes their similarity. Maeda described the parallel yet contrasting perspectives of Albert and the Count as an expression of the original novel's final words "Wait and Hope"; the question put to viewers was how far the Count would go with his revenge and how Albert could reach him, also tying into words spoken by Franz earlier in the series about love and hate both stemming from a person caring for others.

== Production ==
=== Development ===
Gankutsuou was produced by Japanese animation studio Gonzo, with support from Media Factory and Kadokawa Corporation. Maeda acted as director, alongside creating the original concept and scenario draft. Maeda's draft was expanded into a full series by screenwriters Shuichi Kouyama, Natsuko Takahashi and Tomohiro Yamashita. The photography director was Takeo Ogiwara, while 3D CGI graphics were animated by Akira Suzuki. The art directors were Hiroshi Sasaki and Yusuke Takeda. Character designs were done by anime artist Hidenori Matsubara, with mechanical designs being handled by Makoto Kobayashi.

=== Design ===
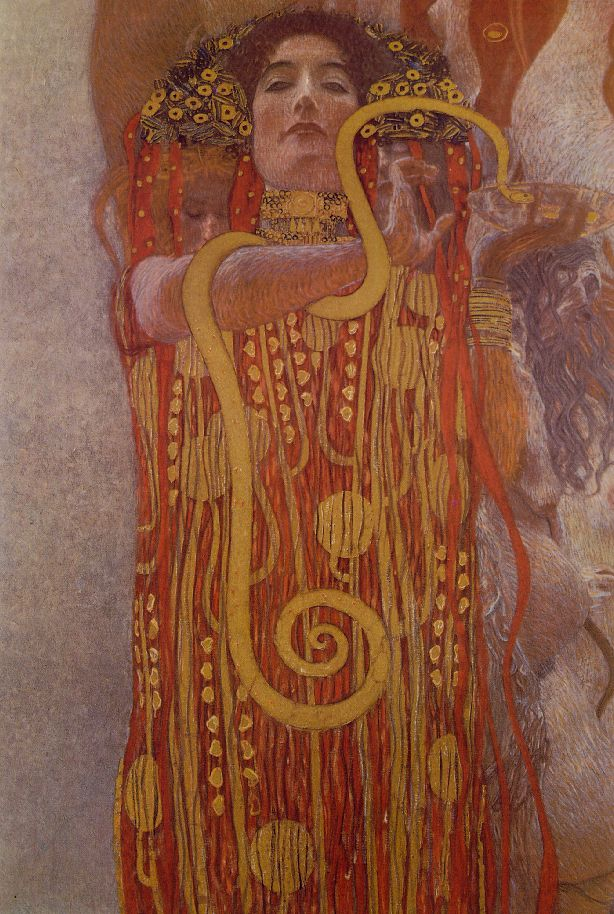
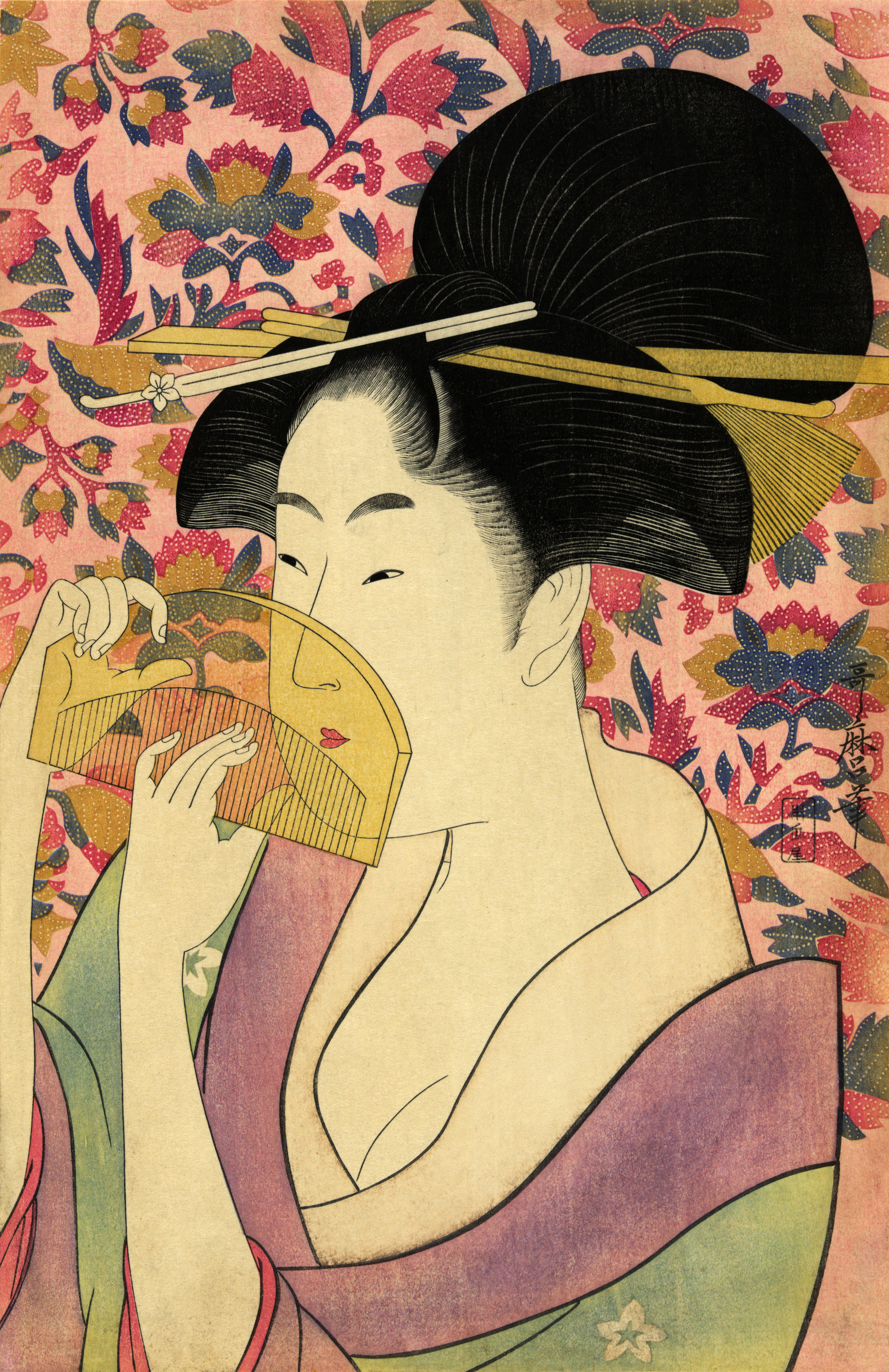
The art design and animation of Gankutsuou combined the style of Western Impressionism and Japanese Ukiyo-e artwork (right). The style of color blocks in animation drew direct influence from the work of Gustav Klimt (left).

The art style of the anime was used by Maeda to combine Western Impressionism with Ukiyo-e, a style of 19th century Japanese painting which strongly influenced the Impressionist movement. Among the artists referenced in the anime's style was Gustav Klimt, who was one of Maeda's favorite artists and provided inspiration for using blocks of strong primary colors. To create the anime's distinct animation style—which saw multiple bold colors and overlaid background and foreground layers—Maeda used a computer graphics program. One of the show's producers, Taichi Hashimoto, later stated that Gonzo wanted to make an anime that "talked" to viewers, something he felt was realized with Gankutsuou. The use of the technique was also inspired by Maeda's liking for clear-cut costumes and outlines in Noh theater, contrasting against the highly detailed traditional animation dominating anime production at the time.

Use of the program came about due to issues created by the source material, which set its events in grand aristocratic houses and consequently made key animation challenging. After trying several different animation types and getting nowhere, Maeda tried the computer-managed layering system, which made the process both possible and much easier than traditional animation. By using the computer program, Maeda could create different texture layers within scenes, creating something simultaneously complicated and minimalist. Because of this style, Maeda had to imagine each scene as being filmed with live-action actors rather than focusing on animation. Maeda wanted to give the impression in scenes that the audience were seeing it from far away, while character gestures held more meaning. This method was also chosen because Maeda wanted to fully express the different textures of character clothing. During the testing stages, Maeda worked with professional stylists, stapling fabric pieces to concept drawings to achieve the desired effect. Because of the use of the program, the illustrators only needed to create the clothing outlines for key frames rather than full character designs. Maeda later described the business side of animation production for Gankutsuou as "a nightmare".

The character designs were created by Matsubara, who had gained notoriety for his work on Oh My Goddess! and the Sakura Wars franchise. Matsubara was brought on at an early stage, when Maeda was putting together internal promotion videos for the project. Matsubara designed the characters based on Maeda's drafts. The character design of Gankutsuou was different from other anime of the time, not using shadows and highlighted elements and instead focusing on vigorous movement and exaggerated posture, communicating a character's personality through movement. Describing his feelings towards the project, Matsubara called designing the adult characters a welcome backlash from his earlier work, which focused almost exclusively on drawing and designing young female protagonists. When Matsubara was given Maeda's draft design for the Count, the character looked like a typical villain; as Matsubara created the final design, he softened the villainous aspects and added noble and sarcastic elements to the Count's expressions. Due to the chosen animation style, Matsubara could not put excessive rumples and creases into clothes as they would be invisible against the underlying textures.

Albert was given multiple outfits to reflect his changing attitudes and roles in the anime; his formal suit reflected his clashing feelings about an arranged marriage to Eugénie. Franz's design was less flamboyant than other characters, reflecting his grounded personality and sense of responsibility towards Albert. Eugénie had the most costume changes of the entire cast, with her styling drawing from 1960s fashion to illustrate the disconnect with her family and her wish to rebel. Haydée's design made her appear doll-like, with one of her dresses being modelled on stained glass and reflective of her melancholy background. Mercedes was designed to show her coldness and fragile spirit in the wake of losing Edmund, with her dress design using ice and crystal as a motif. Fernand was intended to be the polar opposite of the count, clothed in white or similar bright colours; Danglars's golden clothes symbolised his obsession with wealth; and Villefort's clothing symbolised his power of control.

In addition to Japanese designers, Gankutsuou saw a collaboration with American fashion designer Anna Sui. Prior to being approached, Sui had always been fond of Japanese anime. During the Japanese launch of a perfume line, Sui visited Gonzo's studios and was approached by Maeda about a collaboration. Having previously done a collaboration for a Dark Horse Comics project and liking the prospect of working on a full-motion animation project, Sui accepted the offer. Her positive impression of the studio's animation technology and her liking for Dumas's original novel also contributed to her acceptance. The anime uses clothing styles drawn from early 19th century France, showing fashions associated with the time including the "dandy" look and widening hems for women's skirts being incorporated. Sui described these designs as her biggest challenge.

=== Scenario ===
When Maeda began the project, he initially wanted to adapt The Stars My Destination, a science fiction novel by Alfred Bester. Maeda contacted the copyright holders to license an anime adaptation, but he was refused when the holders saw how many changes he proposed to make to the original narrative. Initially disappointed, Maeda searched for another work he could adapt into a science fiction setting and decided upon The Count of Monte Cristo, as Dumas's novel had parallel themes to The Stars My Destination. Maeda first read a simplified version of The Count of Monte Cristo when he was young. When he read the full version as an adult, he saw that the story was far more complex and interesting.

Maeda's initial draft was expanded upon by Kouyama, Takahashi and Yamashita. Faced with adapting a novel that was over 400-pages long into a 24-episode anime, Maeda struggled with including all the novel's key plot points within the anime while keeping viewers entertained. Originally intending to keep the anime firmly within a science fiction setting, his growing appreciation for the novel and its central human tragedy persuaded him to retain as much of the original's 19th century elements as possible. Maeda's first drafts had the Count as the main protagonist of a picaresque romance. As the project went through its draft stages, the focus shifted away from the adult Count and onto Albert, who was made much younger than in the original novel. The shift towards Albert continued the original novel's themes of changing times and clashing views, in addition to altering the dramatic elements by altering character perspectives and relationship dynamics. The anime's late night broadcast also allowed exploration of mature subjects like drug use and same-sex love, elements present in the original novel.

When reworking the Count, Maeda drew from descriptions from Dumas's text of the Count's coldness being attributed to his being one of the undead; his appearance was also influenced by works associated with the circle of Lord Byron, who contributed to both Mary Shelley's novel Frankenstein and early writing about vampires and whom Maeda assumed Dumas had been inspired by when writing about the Count. Early drafts of the Count had him as a far more eccentric character, with his alien nature being more overt and unsettling. The term "Gankutsuou" was originally used for the novel's Japanese translations dating back to its first publication in 1901, but Maeda took the title and turned it into something literal. The figure of Gankutsuou was a reimagining of Abbe Faria, a mentor figure to Edmund in the original novel. The change derived from Maeda's wish to examine the psychology of the Count and his need for revenge. Maeda later refused to define what Gankutsuou was, suggesting that it might be a manifestation of Edmund's madness. The removal of religious elements present in the novel allowed Maeda to create a narrative which needed no social or religious background to appreciate.

Speaking about his role, Fukuyama said that he almost did not take the role of Albert due to auditioning for another project when the script for Gankutsuou was sent to him. However his audition for the first project was a failure, and though disappointed it left him able to play Albert. Hirakawa, Franz's voice actor, was originally going to be cast as Albert. When Hirakawa arrived at the audition for Albert, a mix-up caused Hirakawa to be given Franz's lines. Rather than immediately correcting the mistake, Maeda tried out Hirakawa for the role of Franz and decided to keep him.

=== Music ===
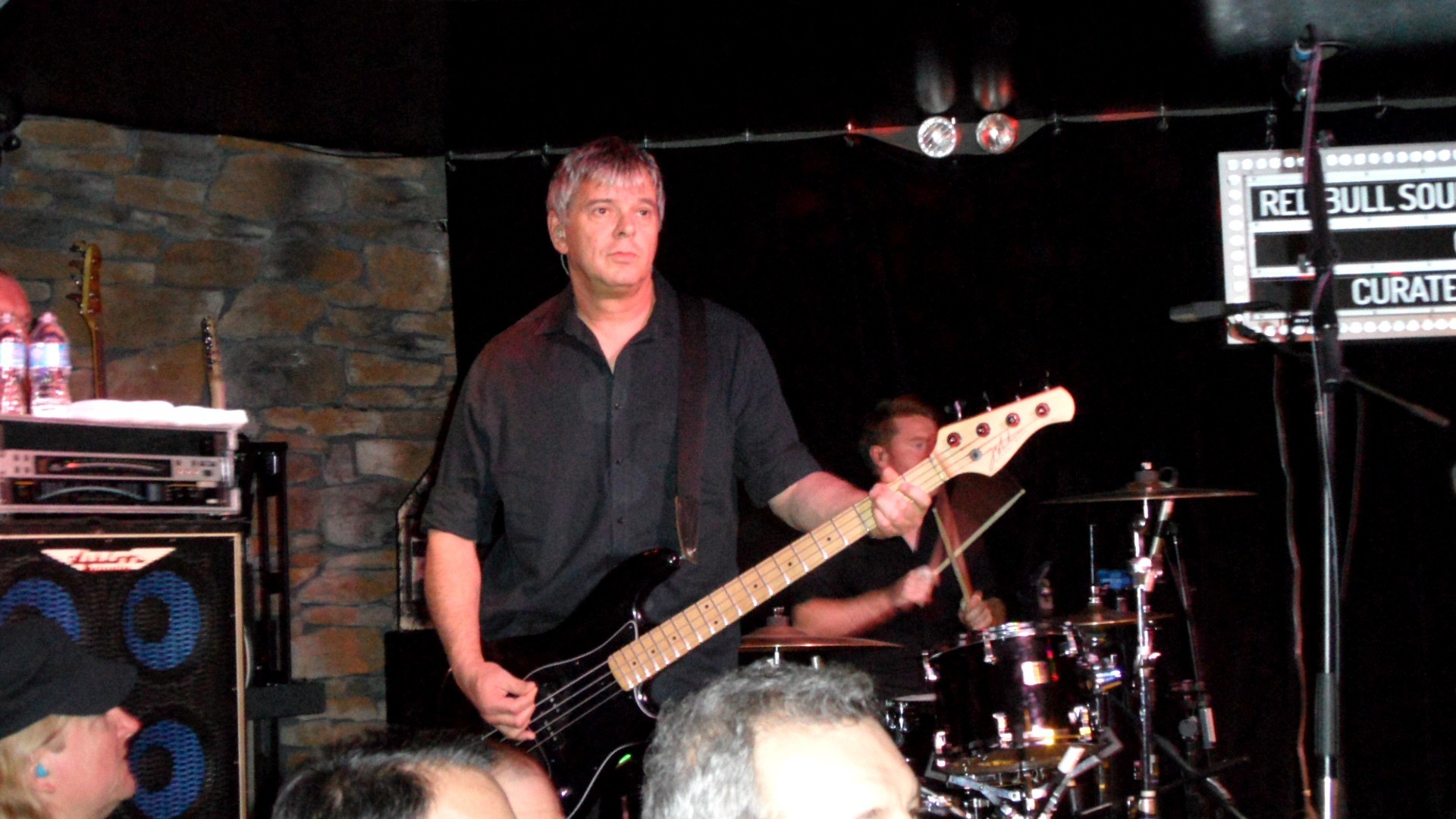
Jean-Jacques Burnel, co-composer of the original music and composer of the main themes for Gankutsuou, in 2013.

Several pieces of original music for Gankutsuou were composed by Jean-Jacques Burnel, bass guitarist for the British rock band the Stranglers. Burnel and Louie Nicastro handled instrumentation and arrangements, additional guitars were handled by Baz Warne, and vocals were provided by Burnel and Phillipa Cookman. Burnel was directly invited onto the project by Maeda, who flew to London to ask him in person. Maeda, who was a fan of Burnel's work, explained his artistic vision for the anime, and Burnel agreed to compose. He worked from his own country, then sent the completed themes to Japan, where they were arranged to fit the animation and pace where needed. Additional musical pieces and arrangements were done by Koji Kasamatsu and Reiji Kitazato. The music covers multiple genres, including opera and electronic dance.

Maeda initially intended the Count's character theme to be the Manfred Symphony from Pyotr Ilyich Tchaikovsky. Burnel had already composed an original character theme, and the rest of the production staff successfully overruled Maeda to keep Burnel's work. The Count's theme mixed original music with samples from Tchaikovsky's Manfred Symphony, Robert le diable by Giacomo Meyerbeer, and Gaetano Donizetti's Lucia di Lammermoor. The classical music was arranged by Kasamatsu, who was the series sound designer. The opening theme "We Were Lovers" and ending theme "You won't see me coming" were composed and sung by Burnel. The lyrics for all songs were written by Burnel.

A soundtrack album, Gankutsuou Original Soundtrack, was released on February 23, 2005, through the Victor Entertainment label Flying Dog. The album featured all music used in the anime including the opening and ending themes. A second album featuring the classical music sampled in the main soundtrack was released by Victor Entertainment on April 13, 2005. Both albums remain exclusive to Japan.

== Broadcast ==
Gankutsuou was first announced in March 2004, alongside its studio, its creator, and its status as an adaptation of Dumas's novel. The 24-episode anime aired on TV Asahi between October 6, 2004, and March 30, 2005. (Note: Gankutsuou aired on Animax on Tuesday 26:12, effectively Wednesday at 2:12 a.m. JST.) The third and fourth episodes underwent slight changes in their broadcast times. The series aired on Animax a month after its TV Asahi broadcast, between November 2, 2004, and April 19, 2005. Late night and afternoon repeats followed the succeeding day. It was later broadcast on NHK BS2 between June 17 and December 2, 2008. A second repeat broadcast on AT-X between January 7 and June 20, 2012.

=== Home media ===
The series was released in Japan on DVD by Media Factory; the series was published across twelve volumes between February 25, 2005, and January 25, 2006, with two episodes on each volume in addition to special features such as interviews and artwork. The complete series was released on Blu-ray on August 24, 2011, by Media Factory.

The anime was first licensed for a Western release by Geneon Entertainment, which released the title on DVD with both subtitled Japanese audio and an English dub. The DVDs were released as "Chapters" with four episodes per volume; the DVDs released between October 25, 2005, and September 12, 2006. The first "Chapter" also released on Universal Media Disc concurrent with the DVD version. This version was released in Australia by Madman Entertainment beginning in April 2006. Gankutsuou was among the anime affected when Geneon Entertainment ended anime distribution in 2007. Following this, Funimation licensed the anime from Gonzo in 2008. The complete series was released on DVD on April 28, 2009. United Kingdom company Anime Limited licensed the anime for commercial release in 2014. The Blu-ray version released in 2016; a limited edition released with steelbook case and artbook released on February 8, while the standard edition released on April 3.

=== Adaptations ===
Gankutsuou was adapted into a manga series which ran in Kodansha's seinen manga magazine Monthly Afternoon from March 25, 2005, to March 25, 2008. The manga was drawn by Maeda, who also provided the story draft; the manga and additional story elements were written by Yura Ariwara. Maeda was approached about a manga adaptation of Gankutsuou during production of the anime. Maeda agreed as it would potentially attract more people to the anime. The manga used a traditional handdrawn style rather than emulating the anime's artstyle, a decision made by Maeda. While the anime focused on the young characters of Albert and Franz, Maeda focused the manga on the machinations and inner workings of the Count himself, expanding upon events either briefly mentioned or left out of the anime. Maeda commented that he would have stopped the manga project quite early without the support of staff from both the anime and the manga. The manga was published in three volumes between December 22, 2005, and July 23, 2008. The three volumes were published in English by Del Rey Manga, an imprint of Random House, between November 2008 and August 2009.

A trilogy of novelizations was released between December 25, 2004, and May 25, 2005. The novels were written by Kouyama, with cover illustrations by Matsubara. Another novel, written by Yura Arihara, was released on August 20, 2008.

A CD drama was published in November 2005 by Victor Entertainment. The drama covers events supplementary to the anime relating to the Count's past and the backstories of various characters.

A stage play adaptation was announced in August 2019 and ran from December 20–28, 2019. The play directed and written by Yū Murai. Anime co-creator and director Mahiro Maeda collaborated on the stage production with Taichi Hashimoto, and Chūji Mikasano is the play's dramaturge. The play stars Shohei Hashimoto as Albert de Morcef, Masashi Taniguchi as the Count of Monte Cristo, and Junon Superboy Anothers member Yō Maejima as Franz d'Épinay.

== Reception ==
Gankutsuou was praised when released in North America, with sources such as Anime Insider; DVDTalk; Newsarama.com; Animeondvd.com; and Anime News Network. judging it to be among the best releases of the year. Reviews have generally been extremely positive. They mainly focused on the visual effects of the show, both to its benefit and its detriment. Stig Høgset of THEM Anime Reviews commented, "the show is beautiful most of the time." Theron Martin of Anime News Network awarded Gankutsuou the Best Series of The Year. It also won the Best TV Series award at the 10th Animation Kobe Fair.

Helen McCarthy in 500 Essential Anime Movies praised its "dazzling visual inventiveness".
