= Daniel Darc =

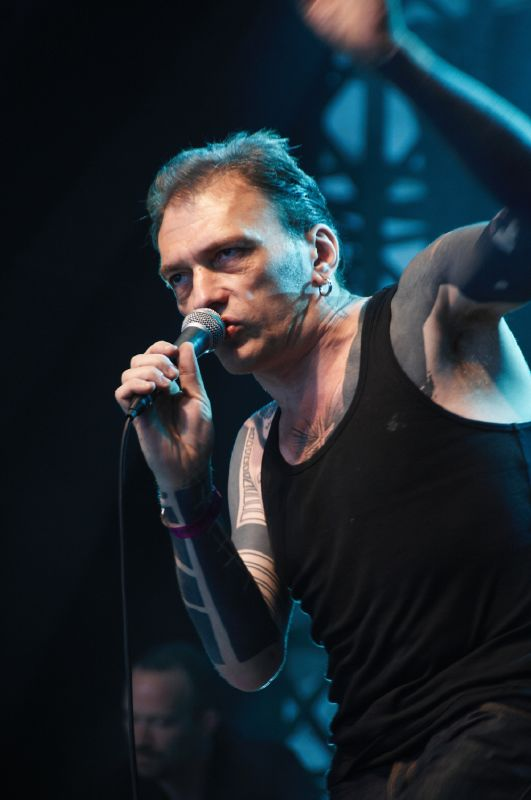

Background information
- Born: Daniel Rozoum; 20 May 1959; Paris, France
- Died: 28 February 2013 (aged 53) Paris, France
- Occupation: Musician
- Instrument: Vocals
- Years active: 1978–2013
- Labels: Sony/Jive Epic
- Website: www.danieldarc.com

Daniel Rozoum (20 May 1959 – 28 February 2013), known as Daniel Darc, was a French singer, who achieved success with his band Taxi Girl (together with Mirwais Ahmadzaï) between 1978 and 1986, and also as a solo artist.

After Taxi Girl was disbanded in 1986, he continued a solo career, releasing Sous influence divine in 1987. Produced by Jacno, this included a cover version of "Comment te dire adieu", a song with lyrics by Serge Gainsbourg that had been popularized by Françoise Hardy. In 1994 he released Nijinsky, followed by two albums in cooperation with composer, director and producer Frédéric Lo: Crève cœur in 2004 and then Amours suprêmes in 2008, with appearances by Alain Bashung, Robert Wyatt, Morgane (singer of Cocoon) and Steve Nieve. The title of the latter album is a reference to "A Love Supreme" by John Coltrane.

The last album released while he was alive was La Taille de mon âme in 2011. Darc died on 28 February 2013. He was 53.

Some of his materials were released posthumously in 2013 under the title Chapelle Sixteen

== Discography ==
=== Albums ===
With Taxi Girl

- 1980: Cherchez le garçon
- 1981: Seppuku
- 1983: Quelqu'un comme toi
- 1983: Suite & fin ?
- 1990: 84–86
- 1990: Quelque part dans Paris

Solo

Year	Album	Peak positions		Certification
Year	Album	FR	BEL (Wa)	Certification
1987	Sous influence divine	–	–	
1994	Nijinsky	–	–	
2004	Crève cœur	33	43	
2008	Amours suprêmes	17	35	
2011	La taille de mon âme	58	80	
2013	Chapelle Sixteen	41	50	

=== Compilation albums ===
- 2003: Le Meilleur de Daniel Darc

=== Collaborations ===
- 1988: Parce que, concept album with Bill Pritchard (with a song written by Charles Aznavour – the title track – and an adaptation of "Stephany Says" – song of Velvet Underground)
- 1988: "La Ville", single produced by Etienne Daho
- 1993: "Les Champs-Élysées" in L’Équipe à Jojo – Les chansons de Joe Dassin, collective tribute album by Le Village Vert
- 1997: writes "Las, dans le ciel" and "Ne laisse pas le jour" for Marie-France (Garcia)
- 1998: 18/12, with 19 torsions (Jean-Paul Fourgeot, Gaultier Machart and Jean Lodereau)
- 2002: writes "Ghost" for Brent (album Platinum Deadstar)
- 2004: sings on "Jeunesse éternelle" by Operation S
- 2005: "She's so untouchable" in Tribute to Johnny Thunders
- 2005: "Rondeau" in On dirait, tribute album to Nino Ferrer
- 2005: "Pauvre garçon", duet with Cali in Menteur
- 2005: "Comme des papillons", duet with Buzy in Borderlove
- 2005: "Mes amis", duet with Jane Birkin in Rendez-vous avec Jane
- 2006: "Comme disait l'ami Johnny Rotten", written and duet with Patrick Eudeline in Mauvaise étoile
- 2006: writes for Tchéky Karyo
- 2006: writes "Cœur Sacré" for Thierry Amiel
- 2006: writes "Ca ne sert à rien d'aimer" for Elisa Tovati, in Je ne mâche pas mes mots
- 2007: Les Aventuriers d'un autre Monde, tour with Jean-Louis Aubert, Alain Bashung, Cali, Richard Kolinka and Raphael
- 2007: writes for Alizée
- 2008: "Promesses", duet with Frédéric Lo in Tombés pour Daho, tribute to Étienne Daho
- 2008: "Chercher le garçon", duet with Superbus in TV show Taratata
- 2009: "O Caroline" in Around Robert Wyatt
- 2009: "Ne plus y penser", duet with Asyl in Brûle, brûle, brûle
- 2009: "La Romance des Cruels", duet with Nosfell
- 2009: "Pas pour moi" in On n'est pas là pour se faire engueuler, tribute album to Boris Vian
