= The Stranglers discography =

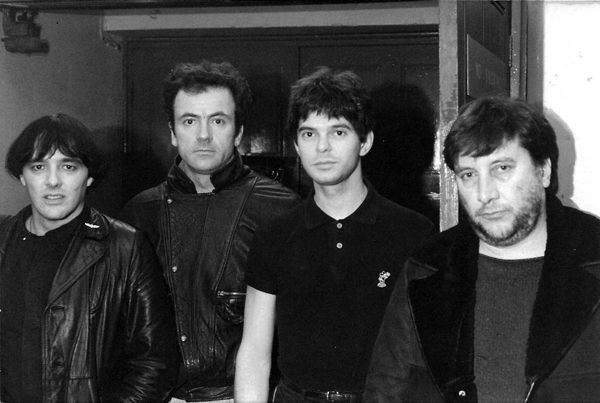
- The Stranglers in 1985
- Studio albums: 18
- Extended plays: 7
- Live albums: 20
- Compilation albums: 17
- Singles: 51
- Video albums: 14
- Box sets: 8

The following is a comprehensive discography of English rock band the Stranglers.

== Albums ==
=== Studio albums ===
Title	Album details	Peak chart positions										Certifications (sales thresholds)
Title	Album details	UK	AUS	CAN	FRA	GER	NL	NOR	NZ	SWE	US	Certifications (sales thresholds)
Rattus Norvegicus	Released: 15 April 1977; Label: United Artists; Formats: LP, MC, 8-track	4	82	—	—	—	—	—	—	—	—	BPI: Platinum
No More Heroes	Released: 23 September 1977; Label: United Artists; Formats: LP, MC, 8-track	2	79	—	—	—	20	—	—	—	—	BPI: Gold
Black and White	Released: 12 May 1978; Label: United Artists; Formats: LP, MC, 8-track	2	81	—	—	—	—	—	—	35	—	BPI: Gold
The Raven	Released: 21 September 1979; Label: United Artists; Formats: LP, MC	4	71	—	—	—	—	—	—	—	—	BPI: Gold
The Gospel According to the Meninblack	Released: 9 February 1981; Label: Liberty; Formats: LP, MC	8	—	—	—	—	—	—	40	—	—	
La folie	Released: 9 November 1981; Label: Liberty; Formats: LP, MC	11	29	—	—	—	13	—	—	—	—	BPI: Silver
Feline	Released: 14 January 1983; Label: Epic; Formats: LP, MC	4	—	88	—	52	39	16	18	—	—	BPI: Silver
Aural Sculpture	Released: 5 November 1984; Label: Epic; Formats: CD, LP, MC	14	38	35	—	17	31	—	13	37	—	BPI: Silver
Dreamtime	Released: 27 October 1986; Label: Epic; Formats: CD, LP, MC	16	64	83	18	—	60	—	45	—	172	BPI: Silver
10	Released: 5 March 1990; Label: Epic; Formats: CD, LP, MC	15	142	—	—	—	71	—	—	—	—	BPI: Silver
Stranglers in the Night	Released: September 1992; Label: China/Psycho; Formats: CD, LP, MC	33	—	—	—	—	—	—	—	—	—	
About Time	Released: 15 May 1995; Label: When!; Formats: CD, LP, MC	31	—	—	—	—	—	—	—	—	—	
Written in Red	Released: 27 January 1997; Label: When!; Formats: CD, MC	52	—	—	—	—	—	—	—	—	—	
Coup de Grace	Released: 26 October 1998; Label: Eagle; Formats: CD	171	—	—	—	—	—	—	—	—	—	
Norfolk Coast	Released: 16 February 2004; Label: EMI; Formats: CD	70	—	—	142	—	—	—	—	—	—	
Suite XVI	Released: 18 September 2006; Label: Liberty EMI; Formats: CD	45	—	—	—	—	—	—	—	—	—	
Giants	Released: 5 March 2012; Label: Absolute/Ear Music; Formats: CD, LP	48	—	—	121	—	—	—	—	—	—	
Dark Matters	Released: 10 September 2021; Label: Absolute/Coursegood; Formats: CD, LP, digital download	4	—	—	118	—	—	—	—	—	—	
"—" denotes releases that did not chart or were not released in that territory.

=== Live albums ===
Title	Album details	Peak chart positions			Certifications (sales thresholds)
Title	Album details	UK	GER	NZ	Certifications (sales thresholds)
Live (X Cert)	Released: 23 February 1979; Label: United Artists; Formats: LP, MC; London, 1977–1978	7	—	49	BPI: Silver
All Live and All of the Night	Released: 8 February 1988; Label: Epic; Formats: CD, LP, MC; London, Reading and Paris, 1985–1987	12	55	—	BPI: Gold
Live at the Hope and Anchor	Released: 9 March 1992; Label: EMI; Formats: CD, MC; London, 1977	—	—	—	
Saturday Night, Sunday Morning	Released: June 1993; Label: Castle Communications; Formats: CD, LP, MC; London, 1990	—	—	—	
Death and Night and Blood	Released: May 1994; Label: Receiver; Formats: CD; Zurich, 1985	—	—	—	
The Stranglers and Friends – Live in Concert	Released: 21 February 1995; Label: Receiver; Formats: CD, LP, MC; London, 1980	—	—	—	
Access All Areas	Released: 1997; Label: SIS; Formats: CD; UK, 1995	—	—	—	
Friday the Thirteenth	Released: October 1997; Label: Epic; Formats: CD; London, 1997	198	—	—	
Live in London	Released: December 1997; Label: Rialto; Formats: CD; London, c. 1985	—	—	—	
Live at the Hammersmith Odeon '81	Released: 1998; Label: EMI; Formats: CD; London, 1982	—	—	—	
5 Live 01	Released: January 2001; Label: SPV Recordings; Formats: 2xCD; Hamburg, 2000	—	—	—	
Live at the Apollo	Released: 2003; Label: Self-released; Formats: CD; Glasgow, 1981	—	—	—	
Coast to Coast	Released: February 2005; Label: Absolute; Formats: CD; UK, 2004	—	—	—	
Themeninblackinbrugge	Released: 2008; Label: Coursegood; Formats: CD; Bruges, 2007	—	—	—	
Live at the Apollo 2010	Released: 2010; Label: Coursegood; Formats: CD; London, 2010	—	—	—	
Feel It Live	Released: June 2013; Label: Absolute/Coursegood; Formats: CD; Giants tour, 2012	—	—	—	
Black and White Live	Released: March 2016; Label: Coursegood; Formats: CD; Norwich, 1993; France and Belgium, 2005–2014; plus 2016 studio recording of "Enough Time"	—	—	—	
Rattus Relived	Released: December 2017; Label: Coursegood; Formats: CD, 2xLP; London, Bristol and Paris, 2007–2016	—	—	—	
Dave Greenfield – A Tribute	Released: 10 September 2021; Label: Coursegood; Formats: CD; UK, 2014–2019; Tokyo, 2019	—	—	—	
Themeninblackintokyo	Released: 3 December 2021; Label: Coursegood; Formats: 2xCD, 2xLP; Tokyo, 2019	—	—	—	
Fifty Years in Black – The Anniversary Tour 2024	Released: 16 August 2024; Label: Coursegood; Formats: 2xCD, 3xLP; UK and Ireland, 2024	36	—	—	
"—" denotes releases that did not chart or were not released in that territory.

=== Compilation albums ===
Title	Album details	Peak chart positions		Certifications (sales thresholds)
Title	Album details	UK	NZ	Certifications (sales thresholds)
IV	Released: 24 September 1980; Label: I.R.S.; Formats: LP, MC; US and Canada-only release; Selections from The Raven plus non-album singles 1978–1980	—	—	
The Collection 1977–1982	Released: September 1982; Label: Liberty; Formats: LP, MC; Best of 1977–1982	12	16	BPI: Gold
Off the Beaten Track	Released: 8 September 1986; Label: Liberty; Formats: LP, MC; Non-album singles and B-sides 1977–1982	80	—	
Rarities	Released: 7 November 1988; Label: Liberty; Formats: CD, LP, MC; Rarities 1977–1981	—	—	
Singles (The UA Years)	Released: 6 February 1989; Label: Liberty; Formats: CD, 2xLP, MC; Best of 1977–1982	57	—	
Greatest Hits 1977–1990	Released: 19 November 1990; Label: Epic; Formats: CD, LP, MC; Best of 1977–1990	4	—	BPI: Platinum
The Early Years – 74-75-76 Rare Live and Unreleased	Released: 2 March 1992; Label: Newspeak; Formats: CD, 2xLP, MC; Demos and live recordings 1974–1976	—	—	
The Sessions	Released: 13 November 1995; Label: Essential!; Formats: CD; BBC Radio 1 recordings 1977–1982	—	—	
The Hit Men	Released: 13 January 1997; Label: Epic; Formats: 2xCD; Best of 1977–1991	113	—	
Peaches: The Very Best of The Stranglers	Released: 10 June 2002; Label: EMI; Formats: CD; Best of 1977–1990	21	—	BPI: Gold
Sweet Smell of Success – Best of the Epic Years	Released: February 2003; Label: Epic; Formats: CD	—	—	
The Very Best of The Stranglers	Released: 12 June 2006; Label: Sony BMG; Formats: CD; Best of 1977–2004	28	—	
Decade: The Best of 1981–1990	Released: July 2009; Label: Camden/Sony Music; Formats: CD; Best of 1981–1990	—	—	
The UA Singles 1977–1982	Released: October 2009; Label: EMI; Formats: 3xCD; Complete singles and B-sides 1977–1982	—	—	
Decades Apart	Released: 1 March 2010; Label: EMI; Formats: 2xCD; Best of 1977–2010	146	—	
Skin Deep – The Collection	Released: October 2013; Label: Music Club Deluxe; Formats: 2xCD; Best of 1982–1990	—	—	
Here and There: The Epic B-Sides Collection 1983–1991	Released: 17 November 2014; Label: Coursegood; Formats: 2xCD; B-sides 1983–1991	—	—	
"—" denotes releases that did not chart or were not released in that territory.

=== Box sets ===
Title	Album details
The Old Testament: The U.A. Studio Recordings (1977–1982)	Released: 9 November 1992; Label: EMI; Formats: 4xCD; First 6 studio albums and non-album singles; Re-released with a bonus fifth disc in 2013
The UA Singles '77–79'	Released: June 2001; Label: EMI; Formats: 10xCD; Singles and B-sides 1977–1979
The Epic Years	Released: September 2001; Label: Epic; Formats: 5xCD; 5 studio albums 1983–1990
The UA Singles '79–82'	Released: April 2003; Label: EMI; Formats: 12xCD; Singles and B-sides 1979–1982
Original Album Classics	Released: September 2009; Label: Sony Music; Formats: 5xCD; 5 studio albums 1983–1990
Giants and Gems: An Album Collection	Released: 24 March 2014; Label: Parlophone; Formats: 11xCD; Best of 1977–1990; 8 studio albums, 2 live albums and 1 compilation album 1977–2012
Original Album Series	Released: 11 September 2015; Label: Parlophone; Formats: 5xCD; 4 studio albums and 1 live album 1978–1981
The Stranglers	Released: 7 July 2023; Label: Mercury Studios; Formats: 4xCD; Limited edition release of 3 studio albums and 1 live album 1995–1998

=== Video albums ===
Title	Album details
The Video Collection 1977–1982	Released: 1982; Label: EMI Music Video, Picture Music International; Formats: VHS, LD
Screentime	Released: November 1986; Label: CBS Fox Video; Formats: VHS
The Meninblack in Colour 1983–1990	Released: January 1991; Label: CMV; Formats: VHS, LD
Saturday Night Sunday Morning	Released: 1993; Label: Castle Music Pictures; Formats: VHS, LD
The Old Testament	Released: November 1992; Label: Picture Music International; Formats: VHS, LD
Friday the Thirteenth	Released: 1997; Label: Eagle Rock; Formats: VHS
Live at Alexandra Palace	Released: 1999; Label: Castle Music Pictures; Formats: DVD
Euro Live	Released: 2002; Label: Zenith; Formats: DVD
Live '78, SF	Released: May 2005; Label: Target Video; Formats: DVD
On Stage on Screen	Released: August 2006; Label: New Wave Pictures/Coursegood; Formats: DVD
Rattus at the Roundhouse	Released: 10 December 2007; Label: Self-released; Formats: DVD
Live at the Apollo 2010	Released: 2010; Label: Coursegood; Formats: DVD; London, 2010
Never to Look Back: The Video Collection 1983–2012	Released: February 2013; Label: Coursegood; Formats: DVD
The Ruby Tour 2014	Released: November 2014; Label: Coursegood; Formats: DVD

== EPs ==
Title	EP details	Peak chart positions
Title	EP details	UK
Something Better Change	Released: August 1977; Label: A&M; Formats: 7"; US-only release	—
Don't Bring Harry	Released: November 1979; Label: United Artists; Formats: 7"	41
No Mercy	Released: 3 December 1984; Label: Philips; Formats: 7"	—
The Nighttracks Radio 1 Session (24th January 1982)	Released: 1989; Label: Nighttracks; Formats: 12", CD	—
Original John Peel Session: 30th August 1977	Released: 28 November 2008; Label: Parlophone; Formats: digital download	—
The John Peel Session (1st March 1977)	Released: 11 September 2009; Label: Parlophone; Formats: digital download	—
BBC in Concert (23rd April 1977)	Released: 5 February 2010; Label: Parlophone; Formats: digital download	—
"—" denotes releases that did not chart.

== Singles ==
Title	Year	Peak chart positions									Certifications (sales thresholds)	Albums
Title	Year	UK	AUS	BEL (FL)	CAN	FRA	GER	IRE	NL	NZ	Certifications (sales thresholds)	Albums
"(Get A) Grip (On Yourself)"/"London Lady"	1977	44	—	—	—	—	—	—	—	35		Rattus Norvegicus
"Peaches"/"Go Buddy Go"	1977	8	54	—	—	—	—	—	—	—	BPI: Silver	Rattus Norvegicus
"Something Better Change"/"Straighten Out"	1977	9	—	—	—	—	—	—	29	—		No More Heroes
"No More Heroes"	1977	8	—	—	—	—	—	—	25	—		No More Heroes
"Sometimes" (Note: "Sometimes" was only released as a single in Japan.)	1977	—	—	—	—	—	—	—	—	—		Rattus Norvegicus
"5 Minutes"	1978	11	—	—	—	—	—	—	—	—		Non-album single
"Nice 'n' Sleazy"	1978	18	—	—	—	—	—	26	—	—		Black and White
"Walk on By"	1978	21	—	—	—	—	—	11	—	—		Non-album singles
"Sverige (Jag är insnöad pä östfronten)" (Note: "Sverige (Jag är insnöad pä östfronten)" is a Swedish-language version of "Sweden (All Quiet on the Eastern Front)" (from the Back and White album), that was only released as a single in Sweden.)	1978	—	—	—	—	—	—	—	—	—		Non-album singles
"Duchess"	1979	14	—	—	—	—	—	27	—	—		The Raven
"Nuclear Device (The Wizard of Aus)"	1979	36	—	—	—	—	—	—	—	—		The Raven
"Bear Cage"	1980	36	—	—	—	—	—	—	—	—		Non-album singles
"Who Wants the World?"	1980	39	—	—	—	—	—	—	—	—		Non-album singles
"Thrown Away"	1981	42	—	—	—	—	—	—	—	—		The Gospel According to the Meninblack
"Just Like Nothing on Earth"	1981	81	—	—	—	—	—	—	—	—		The Gospel According to the Meninblack
"Let Me Introduce You to the Family"	1981	42	—	—	—	—	—	—	—	—		La Folie
"Golden Brown"	1982	2	10	7	—	—	63	3	10	—	BPI: 2× Platinum	La Folie
"La folie"	1982	47	—	—	—	—	—	—	—	—		La Folie
"Strange Little Girl"	1982	7	—	—	—	—	—	7	—	—		The Collection 1977–1982
"European Female"	1983	9	—	—	—	—	—	9	—	—		Feline
"Midnight Summer Dream"	1983	35	—	—	—	—	—	24	—	—		Feline
"Paradise"	1983	48	—	—	—	—	—	—	—	—		Feline
"Skin Deep"	1984	15	11	17	—	—	—	11	21	19		Aural Sculpture
"No Mercy"	1984	37	90	8	88	—	28	—	32	—		Aural Sculpture
"Let Me Down Easy"	1985	48	—	—	—	—	—	—	—	—		Aural Sculpture
"Spain" (Note: "Spain" was only released as a single in Spain.)	1985	—	—	—	—	—	—	—	—	—		Aural Sculpture
"Nice in Nice"	1986	30	—	—	—	—	—	19	—	—		Aural Sculpture
"Always the Sun"	1986	30	21	—	—	15	—	16	42	—		Dreamtime
"Big in America"	1986	48	—	38	—	—	50	28	—	—		Dreamtime
"Shakin' Like a Leaf"	1987	58	—	—	—	—	—	—	—	—		Dreamtime
"Dreamtime" (Note: "Dreamtime" was only released as a single in the US.)	1987	—	—	—	—	—	—	—	—	—		Dreamtime
"All Day and All of the Night" (live)	1987	7	—	—	—	—	—	3	—	38		All Live and All of the Night
"Strange Little Girl" (live) (Note: The live version of "Strange Little Girl" was only released as a single in Continental Europe.)	1988	—	—	—	—	—	—	—	—	—		All Live and All of the Night
"Golden Brown" (live) (Note: The live version of "Golden Brown" was only released as a single in Continental Europe.)	1988	—	—	—	—	—	—	—	—	—		All Live and All of the Night
"Grip '89 (Get A) Grip (On Yourself)" (remix)	1989	33	—	—	—	—	—	—	—	—		Singles (The UA Years)
"96 Tears"	1990	17	165	—	—	—	—	9	—	—		10
"Sweet Smell of Success"	1990	65	—	—	—	—	—	—	—	—		10
"Always the Sun" (Sunny Side Up Mix)	1990	29	—	—	—	—	—	—	—	—		Greatest Hits 1977–1990
"Golden Brown" (reissue)	1991	68	—	—	—	—	—	25	—	—		Greatest Hits 1977–1990
"Heaven or Hell"	1992	46	—	—	—	—	—	—	77	—		Stranglers in the Night
"Sugar Bullets"	1992	115	—	—	—	—	—	—	—	—		Stranglers in the Night
"Lies and Deception"	1995	111	—	—	—	—	—	—	—	—		About Time
"In Heaven She Walks"	1997	86	—	—	—	—	—	—	—	—		Written in Red
"Big Thing Coming"	2004	31	—	—	—	—	—	—	—	—		Norfolk Coast
"Long Black Veil"	2004	51	—	—	—	—	—	—	—	—		Norfolk Coast
"Spectre of Love"	2006	57	—	—	—	—	—	—	—	—		Suite XVI
"Retro Rockets"	2010	198	—	—	—	—	—	—	—	—		Decades Apart
"Mercury Rising"	2012	—	—	—	—	—	—	—	—	—		Giants
"And If You Should See Dave..."	2021	—	—	—	—	—	—	—	—	—		Dark Matters
"If Something's Gonna Kill Me (It Might as Well Be Love)"	2021	—	—	—	—	—	—	—	—	—		Dark Matters
"This Song"	2021	—	—	—	—	—	—	—	—	—		Dark Matters
"Vlad The Oligarch"	2026	—	—	—	—	—	—	—	—	—		Non-album single
"—" denotes releases that did not chart or were not released in that territory.
