= Decades Apart =

Compilation album by the Stranglers
- Released: 1 March 2010
- Recorded: 1976–2010
- Genres: Rock; new wave; punk rock; post-punk
- Length: 132:24
- Label: EMI
- Producer: Various

The Stranglers chronology
Themeninblackinbrugge (2008)	Decades Apart (2010)	Live at the Apollo 2010 (2010)

Singles from Decades Apart
- 1. "Retro Rockets" Released: 22 February 2010

Decades Apart is a 2-CD career spanning compilation album by English rock band the Stranglers, released on 1 March 2010 by EMI. It features 35 tracks taken from each of the five decades of the bands career to date, including two new tracks, "Retro Rockets" and "I Don't See the World Like You Do". The album reached #146 in the UK Albums Chart.

The band embarked on the "Decades Apart" UK tour in February and March of 2010.

== Critical reception ==
Professional ratings
Review scores
Source	Rating
AllMusic	3.5/5 stars

James Allen, writing for AllMusic, said, "The latter-day cuts basically alternate between classy but vague, '80s-indebted alt-rock and more visceral tracks harking back to the Stranglers' early sound ... and the fact remains that the first disc's impact vastly outweighs that of the second. Still, this is as thorough a Strangler's history as one could want, and the Burnel-led lineup comes off much better than some might expect." Both Martin Hutchinson of The Bolton News and Ian D. Hall of Liverpool Sound and Vision called it the definitive Stranglers' compilation.

== Personnel ==
See individual albums for full personnel credits.

The Stranglers

- Jean-Jacques Burnel – bass, vocals
- Dave Greenfield – keyboards
- Jet Black – drums
- Hugh Cornwell – guitar, vocals (disc 1: 2–18 / disc 2: 1–4)
- Paul Roberts – vocals (disc 2: 5–14)
- John Ellis – guitar (disc 2: 5–11)
- Baz Warne – guitar, vocals (disc 1: 1 / disc 2: 12–17)

== Charts ==
Chart	Peak position
UK Albums Chart	146

Single	Chart	Peak position
"Retro Rockets"	UK Singles Chart	198

== Track listing ==
Disc 1
No.	Title	Writer(s)	Original release	Length
1.	"Retro Rockets"	Jet Black, Jean-Jacques Burnel, Dave Greenfield, Baz Warne	New track	3:45
2.	"(Get A) Grip (On Yourself)"	Black, Burnel, Hugh Cornwell, Greenfield	Rattus Norvegicus, 1977	4:03
3.	"Peaches"	Black, Burnel, Cornwell, Greenfield	Rattus Norvegicus	4:06
4.	"Go Buddy Go"	Black, Burnel, Cornwell, Greenfield	B-side of "Peaches", 1977	3:58
5.	"Something Better Change"	Black, Burnel, Cornwell, Greenfield	No More Heroes, 1977	3:36
6.	"No More Heroes"	Black, Burnel, Cornwell, Greenfield	No More Heroes	3:29
7.	"5 Minutes"	Black, Burnel, Cornwell, Greenfield	Non-album single, 1978	3:17
8.	"Nice 'n' Sleazy"	Black, Burnel, Cornwell, Greenfield	Black and White, 1978	3:13
9.	"Walk On By"	Burt Bacharach, Hal David	Non-album single, 1978	6:22
10.	"Duchess"	Black, Burnel, Cornwell, Greenfield	The Raven, 1979	2:30
11.	"Nuclear Device"	Black, Burnel, Cornwell, Greenfield	The Raven	3:32
12.	"Waltzinblack"	Black, Burnel, Cornwell, Greenfield	The Gospel According to the Meninblack, 1981	3:38
13.	"Golden Brown"	Black, Burnel, Cornwell, Greenfield	La folie, 1981	3:28
14.	"La folie"	Black, Burnel, Cornwell, Greenfield	La folie	6:06
15.	"Strange Little Girl"	Black, Burnel, Cornwell, Greenfield, Hans Wärmling	The Collection 1977–1982, 1982	2:42
16.	"European Female"	Black, Burnel, Cornwell, Greenfield	Feline, 1983	4:01
17.	"Skin Deep"	Black, Burnel, Cornwell, Greenfield	Aural Sculpture, 1984	3:55
18.	"No Mercy"	Black, Burnel, Cornwell, Greenfield	Aural Sculpture	3:34
Total length:				69:14

Disc 2
No.	Title	Writer(s)	Original release	Length
1.	"Always the Sun"	Black, Burnel, Cornwell, Greenfield	Dreamtime, 1986	4:00
2.	"Nice in Nice"	Black, Burnel, Cornwell, Greenfield	Dreamtime	3:46
3.	"All Day and All of the Night"	Ray Davies	All Live and All of the Night, 1988	2:31
4.	"96 Tears"	Rudy Martínez	10, 1990	3:04
5.	"Heaven or Hell"	Black, Burnel, John Ellis, Greenfield, Paul Roberts	Stranglers in the Night, 1992	4:32
6.	"Time to Die"	Black, Burnel, Ellis, Greenfield, Roberts	Stranglers in the Night	3:50
7.	"Sugar Bullets"	Black, Burnel, Ellis, Greenfield, Roberts	Stranglers in the Night	5:28
8.	"Golden Boy"	Black, Burnel, Ellis, Greenfield, Roberts	About Time, 1995	3:14
9.	"Lies and Deception"	Black, Burnel, Ellis, Greenfield, Roberts	About Time	3:51
10.	"In Heaven She Walks"	Black, Burnel, Ellis, Greenfield, Roberts	Written in Red, 1997	3:49
11.	"Coup de Grace"	Black, Burnel, Ellis, Greenfield, Roberts	Coup de Grace, 1998	3:23
12.	"Norfolk Coast"	Black, Burnel, Greenfield, Roberts, Warne	Norfolk Coast, 2004	3:45
13.	"Big Thing Coming"	Black, Burnel, Greenfield, Roberts, Warne	Norfolk Coast	3:01
14.	"Long Black Veil"	Black, Burnel, Greenfield, Roberts, Warne	Norfolk Coast	4:03
15.	"Unbroken"	Black, Burnel, Greenfield, Roberts, Warne	Suite XVI, 2006	3:47
16.	"Spectre of Love"	Black, Burnel, Greenfield, Warne	Suite XVI	3:37
17.	"I Don't See the World Like You Do"	Black, Burnel, Greenfield, Warne	New track	3:27
Total length:				63:10
