= Peaches: The Very Best of The Stranglers =

Greatest hits album by the Stranglers
- Released: 10 June 2002
- Recorded: 1977–1990
- Genre: Rock; punk; post-punk; new wave; pop
- Length: 72:38
- Label: EMI
- Producer: Martin Rushent; The Stranglers; Alan Winstanley; Steve Churchyard; Laurie Latham; Mike Kemp; Ted Hayton; Roy Thomas Baker

The Stranglers compilations chronology
Lies and Deception (2002)	Peaches: The Very Best of The Stranglers (2002)	The Rarities (2002)

Peaches: The Very Best of The Stranglers is a compilation album by The Stranglers, released in 2002 by EMI. It reached No. 21 in the UK Albums Chart in June 2002.

The album cover was designed by design4music who would design a similar cover for the compilation The Best Bands...Ever! several months later.

On 27 November 2020, the compilation was released on vinyl for the first time as a double-LP set through Parlophone.

== Critical reception ==
Professional ratings
Review scores
Source	Rating
AllMusic	4/5 stars
Classic Rock	3.5/5 stars
With Guitars	9/10

AllMusic called it "one of the better introductions to the band available," and Classic Rock a "consistently accomplished collection." Classic Rock, however, felt that "the randomised track-listing doesn't help tell the story, presenting instead post-punk's very own Jekyll and Hyde. The bloodthirsty likes of "Something Better Change" and "5 Minutes" land jarringly between sophisticated 80s pop moments such as "Strange Little Girl", "Skin Deep" and "Always the Sun", momentum superseding plot."

== Track listing ==
All tracks are written by the Stranglers (Jet Black, Jean-Jacques Burnel, Hugh Cornwell and Dave Greenfield), except where noted.

No.	Title	Writer(s)	Original release	Length
1.	"Peaches"		Rattus Norvegicus, 1977	4:05
2.	"Golden Brown"		La folie, 1981	3:27
3.	"Walk On By" (Radio edit)	Burt Bacharach, Hal David	Non-album single, 1978	4:24
4.	"No More Heroes"		No More Heroes, 1977	3:27
5.	"Skin Deep"		Aural Sculpture, 1984	3:55
6.	"Hanging Around"		Rattus Norvegicus	4:25
7.	"All Day and All of the Night"	Ray Davies	All Live and All of the Night, 1988	2:30
8.	"Straighten Out"		Double A-side single with "Something Better Change", 1977	2:46
9.	"Nice 'n' Sleazy"		Black and White, 1978	3:11
10.	"Strange Little Girl"	Black, Burnel, Cornwell, Greenfield, Hans Wärmling	The Collection 1977–1982, 1982	2:41
11.	"Who Wants the World?"		Non-album single, 1980	3:12
12.	"Something Better Change"		No More Heroes	3:34
13.	"Always the Sun" (Sunny Side Up Mix)		Dreamtime, 1986	3:57
14.	"European Female"		Feline, 1983	4:01
15.	"Grip '89" / "(Get A) Grip (On Yourself)" (remix)		Rattus Norvegicus	4:01
16.	"Duchess"		The Raven, 1979	2:28
17.	"5 Minutes"		Non-album single, 1978	3:16
18.	"Don't Bring Harry"		The Raven	4:08
19.	"La Folie"		La folie	6:05
20.	"96 Tears"	Rudy Martinez	10, 1990	3:03

== Personnel ==
See original albums for full credits.

The Stranglers

- Hugh Cornwell – guitar, vocals
- Dave Greenfield – keyboards
- Jean-Jacques Burnel – bass, vocals
- Jet Black – drums

Additional musicians

- Eric Clarke – tenor saxophone (15)
- John Ellis – additional guitar (13)

Technical

- Martin Rushent – production (1, 3, 4, 6, 8, 9, 12, 15, 17)
- The Stranglers – production (2, 5, 7, 10, 11, 13, 14, 16, 18, 19)
- Alan Winstanley – production (11, 16, 18)
- Steve Churchyard – production (2, 10, 14)
- Laurie Latham – production (5)
- Mike Kemp – production (13)
- Ted Hayton – production (7)
- Roy Thomas Baker – production (20)
- Michael Brauer – remixing (13)
- Barry Cooder – remixing (15)
- Taff B. Dylan – remixing (15)
- design4music.com – design

== Charts ==
Chart (2025)	Peak position
Hungarian Physical Albums (MAHASZ)	36
