= Greatest Hits 1977–1990 =

Greatest hits album by the Stranglers
- Released: 19 November 1990
- Recorded: 1977–1990
- Genre: Punk rock; new wave; post-punk; pop; rock
- Length: 53:54
- Label: Epic
- Producer: Martin Rushent; The Stranglers; Alan Winstanley; Steve Churchyard; Laurie Latham; Mike Kemp; Ted Hayton; Roy Thomas Baker

The Stranglers compilations chronology
Singles (The UA Years) (1989)	Greatest Hits 1977–1990 (1990)	All Twelve Inches (1992)

Singles from Greatest Hits 1977–1990
- 1. "Always the Sun (Sunny Side Up Mix)" Released: 24 December 1990

Professional ratings
Review scores
Source	Rating
AllMusic	4.5/5 stars

Greatest Hits 1977–1990 is a compilation album by the Stranglers, released in November 1990 by Epic Records. It contains hit singles selected from their back catalogue from both EMI and Epic Records.

The album peaked at No. 4 on the UK Albums Chart and proved to be the band's best selling compilation, eventually spending 47 weeks in the chart (their longest UK chart residency with an individual release). It was certified platinum for 300,000 sales in the UK.

== Track listing ==
All tracks are written by the Stranglers, except where noted.

1. "Peaches" from Rattus Norvegicus, 1977
2. "Something Better Change" from No More Heroes, 1977
3. "No More Heroes" from No More Heroes
4. "Walk On By" (Burt Bacharach, Hal David) Non-album single, 1978
5. "Duchess" from The Raven, 1979
6. "Golden Brown" from La folie, 1981
7. "Strange Little Girl" (Jet Black, Jean-Jacques Burnel, Hugh Cornwell, Dave Greenfield, Hans Wärmling) from The Collection 1977–1982, 1982
8. "European Female" from Feline, 1983
9. "Skin Deep" from Aural Sculpture, 1984
10. "Nice in Nice" from Dreamtime, 1986
11. "Always the Sun" (Single Version) from Dreamtime
12. "Big in America" from Dreamtime
13. "All Day and All of the Night" (Ray Davies) from All Live and All of the Night, 1988
14. "96 Tears" (Rudy Martinez) from 10, 1990
15. "No Mercy" (CD and cassette bonus track) from Aural Sculpture

== Personnel ==
See original albums for full credits.

The Stranglers

- Hugh Cornwell – guitar, vocals
- Dave Greenfield – keyboards
- Jean-Jacques Burnel – bass, vocals
- Jet Black – drums

Technical

- Martin Rushent – production (1–4)
- The Stranglers – production (5–13)
- Alan Winstanley – production (5)
- Steve Churchyard – production (6–8)
- Laurie Latham – production (9, 15)
- Mike Kemp – production (10–12)
- Ted Hayton – production (13)
- Roy Thomas Baker – production (14)
- Jean Luke Epstein (Graphyk) – design
- Grant Louden (Graphyk) – design
- Mike Prior – photography
- Chris Twomey – liner notes
