= Friday the Thirteenth (album) =

Live album by the Stranglers
- Released: 1997
- Recorded: 13 June 1997
- Venues: Royal Albert Hall, London
- Studio: The Manor Mobile
- Genre: Rock
- Length: 66:04
- Label: Eagle

The Stranglers live albums chronology
Access All Areas (1997)	Friday the Thirteenth (1997)	Live at the Hammersmith Odeon '81 (1998)

Friday the Thirteenth is a live album by the English rock band the Stranglers, released in 1997 by Eagle Records.

To mark the twenty-first anniversary of their original recording contract with United Artists Records, the Stranglers played to a sold out Royal Albert Hall (London, UK) with an eighteen-piece string orchestra (the Electra Strings). Friday the Thirteenth presents part of the set (these songs, plus the remainder of the set can be found on the accompanying DVD release). Composer and musician Jocelyn Pook makes contributions to the songs "Waltz in Black", "Valley of the Birds", "Daddy's Riding the Range", "Golden Brown" and "No More Heroes".

== Critical reception ==
Professional ratings
Review scores
Source	Rating
AllMusic	1.5/5 stars

Jack Rabid, writing for AllMusic, gave the album a negative one-and-a-half star review, calling its sound "clear but dull, flat, and lifeless," and the production "soulless." He also criticised vocalist Paul Roberts' performance, clearly not satisfied with him as replacement for original singer Hugh Cornwell, calling him a "facile, slick hack." Rabid wrote, "hearing some damn great material butchered [by Roberts] is rock and roll sacrilege." On a positive note, Rabid felt that "the lovely string section adds a nice dimension, and the original three members remain solid and fierce." Rabid concluded that Friday the Thirteenth "is as welcome as vomit on the Albert Hall's beautiful red carpets."

== Track listing ==
All tracks are written by Jet Black, Jean-Jacques Burnel, Hugh Cornwell and Dave Greenfield, except where noted.

No.	Title	Writer(s)	Length
1.	"Waltzinblack" (strings only)		2:21
2.	"Valley of the Birds"	Black, Burnel, John Ellis, Greenfield, Paul Roberts	2:39
3.	"Skin Deep"		4:42
4.	"Always the Sun"		4:06
5.	"Face"	Black, Burnel, Ellis, Greenfield, Roberts	3:08
6.	"Daddy's Riding the Range"	Black, Burnel, Ellis, Greenfield, Roberts	4:42
7.	"Strange Little Girl"	Cornwell, Burnel, Greenfield, Black, Hans Wärmling	2:45
8.	"Still Life"	Black, Burnel, Ellis, Greenfield, Roberts	5:16
9.	"Let Me Down Easy"		4:25
10.	"Golden Brown"		4:13
11.	"Lies and Deception"	Black, Burnel, Ellis, Greenfield, Roberts	3:45
12.	"European Female"		3:55
13.	"All Day and All of the Night"	Ray Davies	3:10
14.	"Duchess"		2:20
15.	"Down in the Sewer"		7:10
16.	"5 Minutes"		3:37
17.	"No More Heroes"		3:58

2007 Japanese reissue bonus tracks

No.	Title	Writer(s)	Length
18.	"Summer in the City"	John Sebastian, Mark Sebastian, Steve Boone
19.	"Wonderful Land"	Black, Burnel, Ellis, Greenfield, Roberts

== Extra tracks on DVD release ==
No.	Title	Writer(s)	Length
6.	"Heaven or Hell" (between "Face" and "Midnight Summer Dream")	Black, Burnel, Ellis, Greenfield, Roberts
7.	"Midnight Summer Dream" (between "Heaven or Hell" and "Daddy's Riding the Range")
13.	"Sinister" (between "Golden Brown" and "Lies and Deception")	Black, Burnel, Ellis, Greenfield, Roberts
16.	"Thrown Away" (between "European Female" and "All Day and All of the Night")
21.	"96 Tears" (between "5 Minutes" and "No More Heroes")	Rudy Martinez
23.	"Summer in the City" (last track after "No More Heroes")	Sebastian, Sebastian, Boone

== Personnel ==
Credits adapted from the album liner notes.

The Stranglers

- Paul Roberts – vocals
- Jean-Jacques Burnel – bass, vocals
- John Ellis – guitar, vocals
- Dave Greenfield – keyboards, vocals
- Jet Black – drums

Additional musicians

- The Electra Strings – strings
- Jocelyn Pook – string co-ordination

Technical

- Recorded by The Manor Mobile
- Max Bisgrove – mixing
- Dave Conroy – digital editing
- John McMurtie – photography
- Mark Cunningham – additional photography
