= IV (The Stranglers album) =

Compilation album by the Stranglers
- Released: 24 September 1980
- Recorded: 1977–1980
- Genre: Post-punk
- Length: 37:04
- Label: I.R.S. (SP70011)
- Producers: The Stranglers; Alan Winstanley; Martin Rushent; Steve Churchyard

The Stranglers compilations chronology
IV (1980)	The Collection 1977–1982 (1982)

Professional ratings
Review scores
Source	Rating
AllMusic	2/5 stars
Encyclopedia of Popular Music	3/5 stars

IV is a compilation album by the Stranglers, released on 24 September 1980 on I.R.S. Records and only available in the US and Canada.

The Stranglers previous album, The Raven, had not been released in the US. IV contained, on side one, a selection of tracks from The Raven. Side two contained the following tracks, which were previously unreleased on any Stranglers album: "5 Minutes" and "Rok It to the Moon" (1978 UK single), "Vietnamerica" (which was later released as the B-side to the 1981 "Let Me Introduce You to the Family" UK single), "G.m.B.H" (an extended version of the 1980 UK single "Bear Cage", which was unavailable elsewhere) and "Who Wants the World?" (1980 UK single). The previously unreleased "Vietnamerica" was written and recorded during sessions for The Raven.

The original release also came with a free single containing "Choosey Susie" (from the 1977 UK single free with the Rattus Norvegicus album), "Straighten Out" (b-side to the 1977 UK Single "Something Better Change") plus "Ode to Joy / Do The European" (a live Jean-Jacques Burnel solo track, unavailable elsewhere until the 1992 CD release of his first solo album Euroman Cometh), and "White Room", a Cream cover from the Nosferatu album by Hugh Cornwell and Robert Williams.

== Track listing ==
All tracks are written by the Stranglers, except where noted.

Side one
No.	Title	Original release	Length
1.	"The Raven"	The Raven, 1979	5:12
2.	"Baroque Bordello"	The Raven	3:48
3.	"Duchess"	The Raven	2:29
4.	"Nuclear Device"	The Raven	3:28
5.	"Meninblack"	The Raven	4:48

Side two
No.	Title	Original release	Length
6.	"5 Minutes"	Non-album single, 1978	3:15
7.	"Rok It to the Moon"	B-side to "5 Minutes"	2:44
8.	"Vietnamerica"	Previously unreleased	4:09
9.	"G.m.B.H"	12" version of non-album single Bear Cage, 1980	3:52
10.	"Who Wants the World?"	Non-album single, 1980	3:20

Note

The extended version of "G.m.B.H" is not the full six-and-a-half-minute version of the track as it is faded out earlier, lasting just under four minutes.

Free single

Side A
No.	Title	Writer(s)	Original release	Length
1.	"Ode to Joy"/"Do the European" (live) (J.J. Burnel)	Ludwig van Beethoven, Jean-Jacques Burnel	Previously unreleased	4:25
2.	"Choosey Susie" (The Stranglers)		Free single with Rattus Norvegicus, 1977	3:12

Side B
No.	Title	Writer(s)	Original release	Length
3.	"White Room" (Hugh Cornwell and Robert Williams)	Jack Bruce, Pete Brown	Nosferatu, 1979	3:52
4.	"Straighten Out" (The Stranglers)		B-side to "Something Better Change", 1977	2:48

== Personnel ==
Credits adapted from the album liner notes.

The Stranglers

- Hugh Cornwell – guitar, vocals
- Jean-Jacques Burnel – bass, vocals
- Dave Greenfield – keyboards
- Jet Black – Drums

Technical

- The Stranglers – production (1–5, 8–10)
- Alan Winstanley – production (1–5), engineering (1–7)
- Martin Rushent – production (6, 7)
- Steve Churchyard – production (9), engineering (1–5, 8, 9)
- Gary Edwards – engineering (10)
- Laurence Diana – engineering (10)
- John Pasche – art direction
- Shoot That Tiger! – design
- Phil Jude – cover photography
