= Off the Beaten Track (album) =

Compilation album by The Stranglers
- Released: 8 September 1986
- Recorded: 1977–1982
- Genre: Rock
- Label: EMI

The Stranglers compilations chronology
The Collection 1977–1982 (1982)	Off the Beaten Track (1986)	Rarities (1988)

Professional ratings
Review scores
Source	Rating
Allmusic	3/5 stars
Number One	2/5 stars
Record Mirror	3.5/5

Off the Beaten Track is a compilation album by The Stranglers. It was released by EMI, who had acquired the back catalogues of the Strangler's former labels United Artists and Liberty. The compilation collects tracks which were originally only available as the A-side or B-sides to various 7" vinyl singles released by United Artists and Liberty.

The collection reached No. 80 in the UK Albums Chart in September 1986.

== Track listing ==
1. "Go Buddy Go" - B-side to "Peaches" (1977)
2. "Top Secret" - B-side to "Thrown Away" (1981)
3. "Old Codger" - B-side to "Walk On By" (1978)
4. "Maninwhite" - B-side to "Just Like Nothing On Earth" (1981)
5. "Rok It to the Moon" - B-side to "5 Minutes" (1978)
6. "Love 30" - B-side to "Golden Brown" (1982)
7. "Shut Up" - B-side to "Nice 'n' Sleazy" (1978)
8. "Walk On By" - non-album single, and also from the Black and White free EP (1978)
9. "Vietnamerica" - B-side to "Let Me Introduce You to the Family" (1981)
10. "Mean to Me" - from the Black and White free EP (1978)
11. "Cruel Garden" - B-side to "Strange Little Girl" (1982)
12. "Yellowcake UF_{6}" - B-side to "Nuclear Device (The Wizard of Aus)" (1979)
13. "5 Minutes" - non-album single (1978)

== Personnel ==
The Stranglers

- Hugh Cornwell - guitar, vocals
- Dave Greenfield - keyboards, vocals
- Jean-Jacques Burnel - bass, vocals
- Jet Black - drums, percussion

Additional musicians

- George Melly - lead vocals on "Old Codger"
- Lew Lewis - harmonica on "Old Codger"
