= The Collection 1977–1982 =

The Collection 1977-1982

Compilation album by The Stranglers
- Released: September 1982
- Recorded: various
- Genre: Punk rock
- Length: 55:33
- Label: Liberty
- Producer: Various

The Stranglers compilations chronology
IV (1980)	The Collection 1977-1982 (1982)	Off The Beaten Track (1986)

Professional ratings
Review scores
Source	Rating
Allmusic	4/5 stars

The Collection 1977–1982 is a compilation album by The Stranglers. It was released to complete their contract with EMI, who had acquired the band's back catalogue on the United Artists and Liberty labels. It peaked at No. 12 in the UK Albums Chart in 1982.

The album collected together several of the band's most popular singles and album tracks, and also included a "new" track, "Strange Little Girl". The inclusion of "Strange Little Girl" was an ironic move on the band's part: EMI had been indifferent to the band when they acquired their catalogue the previous year, not regarding them as a commercial proposition. The band proved them wrong by having a hit single with "Golden Brown", despite lacklustre promotion from EMI. When required to deliver a final single, the band re-recorded the song "Strange Little Girl", which had originally been on a demo tape they had given to EMI in 1974. EMI rejected the tape at the time, but the re-recorded "Strange Little Girl" went on to be a top 10 hit.

== Track listing ==
All songs written by Hugh Cornwell, Jean-Jacques Burnel, Dave Greenfield, Jet Black, except where noted.

Side one
No.	Title	Writer(s)	Place of Origin	Length
1.	"(Get A) Grip (On Yourself)"		Rattus Norvegicus, 1977	4:03
2.	"Peaches"		Rattus Norvegicus, 1977	4:05
3.	"Hanging Around"		Rattus Norvegicus, 1977	4:27
4.	"No More Heroes"		No More Heroes, 1977	3:28
5.	"Duchess"		The Raven, 1979	2:30
6.	"Walk On By"	Burt Bacharach, Hal David	Bonus single issued with Black and White, 1978	6:22
7.	"Waltzinblack"		The Gospel According to the Meninblack, 1981	3:39

Side two
No.	Title	Writer(s)	Place of Origin	Length
1.	"Something Better Change"		No More Heroes, 1977	3:35
2.	"Nice 'n' Sleazy"		Black and White, 1978	3:11
3.	"Bear Cage" ("G.m.B.H" version included in the US only compilation "IV")		Non-album single, 1980	3:51
4.	"Who Wants the World?"		Non-album single, 1980	3:04
5.	"Golden Brown"		La folie, 1981	3:28
6.	"Strange Little Girl"	Cornwell, Burnel, Greenfield, Black, Hans Wärmling	Non-album single, 1982	2:42
7.	"La Folie"		La folie, 1981	6:11

== Video ==
A companion VHS video was released to accompany the album, containing promo clips for several of the band's songs. This was later released on DVD.

1. "(Get A) Grip (On Yourself)"
2. "Something Better Change"
3. "Peaches" (live in Battersea Park, London, 16 September 1978)
4. "Hanging Around" (live in Battersea Park, London, 16 September 1978)
5. "Straighten Out"
6. "5 Minutes"
7. "No More Heroes"
8. "Sweden (All Quiet on the Eastern Front)"
9. "Nice 'n' Sleazy" (live in Battersea Park, London, 16 September 1978)
10. "Duchess"
11. "Nuclear Device (The Wizard of Aus)"
12. "Bear Cage"
13. "Who Wants The World?"
14. "Golden Brown"
15. "La Folie"
16. "Strange Little Girl"
