= Live at the Hammersmith Odeon =

Live at the Hammersmith Odeon may refer to:

- Live at Hammersmith Odeon (Kate Bush album)
- Live at the Hammersmith Odeon (Nuclear Assault album)
- Live at Hammersmith Odeon, by Black Sabbath
- Live at the Hammersmith Odeon '81, by Stranglers
- Live at the Odeon Hammersmith London, by Billy Connolly

== See also ==
- Live at Hammersmith (disambiguation)
- Hammersmith Odeon London '75, by Bruce Springsteen
- Hammersmith Apollo, the venue formerly known as the Hammersmith Odeon
