= Off the Beaten Track =

Off the Beaten Track may refer to:

- Off the Beaten Track (essay collection), a 1950 essay collection by Martin Heidegger
- Off the Beaten Track (album), a 1986 compilation album by The Stranglers
- Off the Beaten Track (TV series), a 2013 British television series

== See also ==
- Off the Beatle Track, a 1964 album by George Martin & His Orchestra
