= Live 1991 =

Live 1991 may refer to:

- Billy Connolly Live 1991
- Live 1991 by The Wedding Present
