= Live at Hammersmith =

There are several bands which has recorded albums called Live at Hammersmith.

- Live at Hammersmith (Whitesnake album)
- Live at Hammersmith (Twisted Sister album)
- Live at Hammersmith (Rick Wakeman album)
- Live at Hammersmith (The Darkness album)

== Similar names ==
- Live at the Hammersmith Odeon (Kate Bush album)
- Live at the Odeon Hammersmith London, Billy Connolly comedy album
- No Sleep 'til Hammersmith, Motörhead's 1981 live album
- Live at the Hammersmith Odeon (Nuclear Assault album)
- Live at the Hammersmith Odeon '81, The Stranglers album
- Live at Hammersmith '79, Ted Nugent album
- Live at Hammersmith '84, by Jethro Tull
- Beast over Hammersmith, by Iron Maiden
- Live at Hammersmith Odeon, by Black Sabbath
- Hammersmith Odeon London '75, by Bruce Springsteen
