= Euro Live =

euro live

Video by The Stranglers
- Released: 2002
- Recorded: 2000
- Genre: Rock
- Length: 90 mins
- Label: Zenith
- Producer: Nick West; Gary Knighton

The Stranglers chronology
Friday the 13th (1997)	euro live (2002)	On Stage On Screen (2006)

"euro live" is a live DVD recording by The Stranglers of a concert in Poland from 2000, one of the first concerts with new guitarist, Baz Warne. The DVD also features a band history, Discography and The Stranglers' Kosovo Home Movie

== Track listing ==
1. "Waltzinblack" (intro)
2. "(Get a) Grip (on Yourself)"
3. "Skin Deep"
4. "Golden Boy"
5. "Coup de Grace"
6. "Nice 'n' Sleazy"
7. "Always the Sun"
8. "Thrown Away"
9. "Five Minutes"
10. "Valley of the Birds"
11. "Money"
12. "Strange Little Girl"
13. "Golden Brown"
14. "Goodbye Toulouse"
15. "Something Better Change"
16. "Who Wants the World"
17. "96 Tears"
18. "Tank"
19. "Hanging Around"
20. "Duchess"
21. "Straighten Out"
22. "No More Heroes"
