= On Stage on Screen =

On Stage On Screen

Video by The Stranglers
- Released: 2006
- Recorded: 2005
- Genre: Rock

The Stranglers chronology
euro live (2002)	On Stage On Screen (2006)	Rattus at the Roundhouse (2007)

"On Stage On Screen" is a live DVD recording by The Stranglers of their concert at Shepherd's Bush, London on 2 December 2005. The performance comprised an acoustic set, the premiere of the short film Norfolk Coast (starring Jean Jacques Burnel) and the live set. All three segments were directed by Robin Bextor and the DVD is produced by New Wave Pictures.

== Track listing (Live set) ==
1. "Waltzinblack" (intro)
2. "Norfolk Coast"
3. "All Day And All Of The Night"
4. "Big Thing Coming"
5. "Peaches"
6. "Skin Deep"
7. "Always The Sun"
8. "Long Black Veil"
9. "I've Been Wild"
10. "Lost Control"
11. "Goodbye Toulouse"
12. "Summat Outanowt"
13. "Walk On By"
14. "Duchess"
15. "Burning Up Time"
16. "Toiler On the Sea"
17. "Time To Die"
18. "Tank"
19. "Mine All Mine"
20. "No More Heroes"

== Track listing (Acoustic set) ==
1. "Instead Of This"
2. "Southern Mountains"
3. "Dutch Moon"
4. "Tucker's Grave"
5. "Strange Little Girl"
6. "Santfe Kuss"
7. "Still Life"
