= Singles (The UA Years) =

Compilation album by The Stranglers
- Released: 6 February 1989
- Recorded: 1977–1982
- Genre: Rock
- Label: EMI

The Stranglers compilations chronology
Rarities (1988)	Singles (The UA Years) (1989)	Greatest Hits 1977-1990 (1990)

Singles (The UA Years) is a compilation album by The Stranglers. It was released by EMI, who had acquired the Strangler's back catalogue from United Artists and Liberty. The compilation was a collection of all the singles released by the band on those labels, between 1977 and 1982 (some of which had not originally been included on studio albums).

The collection peaked at No. 57 in the UK Albums Chart.

== Track listing ==
1. "(Get a) Grip (On Yourself)"
2. "Peaches"
3. "Go Buddy Go"
4. "Something Better Change"
5. "Straighten Out"
6. "No More Heroes"
7. "5 Minutes"
8. "Nice 'N' Sleazy"
9. "Walk On By"
10. "Duchess"
11. "Nuclear Device"
12. "Don't Bring Harry"
13. "Bear Cage"
14. "Who Wants the World?"
15. "Thrown Away"
16. "Just Like Nothing on Earth"
17. "Let Me Introduce You To The Family"
18. "Golden Brown"
19. "La Folie"
20. "Strange Little Girl"
