= Rattus at the Roundhouse =

Rattus At The Roundhouse

Video by The Stranglers
- Released: 2007
- Recorded: 2007
- Genre: Rock
- Director: Dave Meehan

The Stranglers chronology
On Stage on Screen (2006)	Rattus At The Roundhouse (2007)	Live at the Apollo 2010 (DVD & CD) (2010)

Rattus At The Roundhouse is a live DVD recording by The Stranglers of their concert at The Roundhouse, Camden, London on 4 November 2007. The performance was a song by song repeat of the same concert they played at the same venue, exactly 30 years ago to the day, with the addition of two more recent tracks ("Duchess" & "Spectre of Love") as the final encore.

== Track listing ==
1. No More Heroes
2. Ugly
3. Bring on the Nubiles
4. Dead Ringer
5. Sometimes
6. Dagenham Dave
7. Goodbye Toulouse
8. Hanging Around
9. 5 Minutes
10. Bitching
11. Burning up Time
12. I Feel Like a Wog
13. Straighten Out
14. Something Better Change
15. London Lady
16. Peaches
17. Grip
18. Go Buddy Go
19. Spectre of Love
20. Duchess

== Technical Problems ==
Before the beginning of Dagenham Dave, Dave Greenfield's Keyboard setup stops working properly, as hardly any sound is coming through the speakers. While this issue was being fixed, Baz was improvising some small talk, dropping comments about football teams and TV programs. The issue is resolved within 3 minutes, at least temporarily.

Somewhat famously, during Hanging Around, the midi keyboard Dave Greenfield used for the wurli sound completely stops working, or at least stops communicating with the sound module or speaker that was connected to it. Dave appears very anxious and confused, as crew members attempt to fix the problem. However they manage to make it worse, the keyboard used for organ sounds freezes and is stuck on an A Minor chord for a dozen or two seconds, which leads to all of his equipment not making sounds. About halfway through the solo, JJ signals to the band to stop playing, and announces to the crowd they'd come back in 5 minutes.

Eventually the problem is resolved, and JJ asks the crowd if they should restart the whole performance, which of course they don't take issue with. All is well until near the end of Dagenham Dave (yet again), in which the cameras show the crew members messing with equipment again. It's not clear what happened, but it's shown Dave's keyboards don't work, and the keyboard solo is instead just being played by another source while they fix the problem.

Once again the sound gets resolved, and while it sounds like everything is working properly for the rest of the show, there are still moments, especially in 5 minutes when Dave Greenfield seems in distress and that certain things aren't working
