= The Gospel According to the Meninblack =

Studio album by the Stranglers
- Released: 9 February 1981
- Recorded: January–August 1980 ("Two Sunspots", May 1979)
- Studios: Musicland Studios (Munich); Pathé Marconi Studios (Paris); Startling Studios (Berkshire); RCA Studios (Rome); Pebble Beach Sound Studio (Worthing); Eden Studios (London)
- Genres: Post-punk; new wave; dark wave; experimental; gothic rock
- Length: 40:28
- Label: Liberty
- Producer: The Stranglers

The Stranglers chronology
The Raven (1979)	The Gospel According to the Meninblack (1981)	La Folie (1981)

Singles from The Gospel According to the Meninblack
- 1. "Thrown Away" Released: January 1981; 2. "Just Like Nothing on Earth" Released: March 1981

Professional ratings
Review scores
Source	Rating
AllMusic	2/5 stars
Encyclopedia of Popular Music	3/5 stars
The Great Rock Discography	5/10

The Gospel According to the Meninblack (sometimes referred to as just The Meninblack) is the fifth album by English rock band the Stranglers, an esoteric concept album released 9 February 1981, on the Liberty label. The album explores conspiratorial themes involving alien visitations to Earth, the sinister governmental men in black, and the involvement of these elements in well-known biblical narratives. This was not the first time the Stranglers had used this concept; "Meninblack" on the earlier The Raven album and subsequent 1980 single-release "Who Wants the World?" had also explored it.

== History ==
The album is an elaboration of concepts first introduced by the band on the aforementioned track from their preceding album, The Raven. Hugh Cornwell, former singer-songwriter and guitarist with the group, has stated his belief that the album is the pinnacle of the Stranglers' artistic and creative output, and he cites it as his favourite album by the band. In a 2022 interview promoting his solo release Moments of Madness Cornwell reiterated this position saying "I think that we were all at the top of our game when we made ‘Men in Black’ and it comes through." The Stranglers' bassist, Jean-Jacques Burnel, shares this opinion, stating in a 2014 interview "It was a bit of a low point when The Meninblack came out and it wasn’t regarded as the masterpiece that I thought it was." Burnel regards the album as often techno in essence, though The Meninblack predates the emergence of that genre by some years.

The single releases from the album were "Thrown Away", which reached UK chart position 42 and "Just Like Nothing on Earth", their first single to miss the top 50.

The opening instrumental "Waltzinblack" was originally intended to be the second single release from the album, but was withdrawn by Liberty, which deemed it "unrepresentative". It was later used as the theme music for Keith Floyd's BBC TV series. The band developed a tradition of using the track to open their live performances.

The album initially sold around 50,000 copies, their worst-selling UK album to date, peaking at number eight on the UK Albums Chart; it spent five weeks in the listings.

In a 2015 interview on British TV, Burnel stated that the band experimented with heroin to help their creative process, and this album was the result.

== Legacy ==
Chris Roberts of Classic Rock writes that the Stranglers "retained full artistic freedom, and in The Gospel According to the Meninblack made what some have described as the first goth album, and others as the first techno album." Rob Hughes, also of Classic Rock, believes it to be "[t]he closest The Stranglers ever got to a full-on prog album," adding: "In the almost total absence of guitars, synths and electronic effects dominate, be it on the very strange 'Manna Machine' or the fairground-like 'Waltzinblack'."

Burnel remains fond of the album for being "completely off-the-wall." He believes that while the album is now sonically "quite modern", at the time the album was viewed negatively because it was by the Stranglers, adding: "It was never regarded as an art album, because people just didn't see us in that light, apart from Billboard's reviewer who said it was a work of genius. If you're going out having punch-ups, being physical savages, you're not allowed to have intellectual pretensions. But we had a foot in both camps, really." Hugh Cornwell considers it "probably" his favourite Stranglers album, "Because I like the underdog. It underachieved. And I love the spaceships landing."

In 2026, Uncut ranked The Gospel According to Meninblack at number 149 in their list of "The 200 Greatest Goth Albums", describing the music as "the prog end of goth rock", a style which they believe validates the record's concept themes.

== Track listing ==
All tracks written and arranged by the Stranglers.

Side A
No.	Title	Lead vocals	Length
1.	"Waltzinblack"	(instrumental)	3:38
2.	"Just Like Nothing on Earth"	Hugh Cornwell	3:55
3.	"Second Coming"	Cornwell	4:22
4.	"Waiting for the Meninblack"	Cornwell	3:44
5.	"Turn the Centuries, Turn"	(instrumental)	4:35

Side B
No.	Title	Lead vocals	Length
6.	"Two Sunspots"	Cornwell	2:32
7.	"Four Horsemen"	Dave Greenfield	3:40
8.	"Thrown Away"	Jean-Jacques Burnel	3:30
9.	"Manna Machine"	Cornwell	3:17
10.	"Hallow to Our Men"	Cornwell	7:26
Total length:			40:28

2001 CD reissue bonus tracks
No.	Title	Origin	Length
11.	"Top Secret"	"Thrown Away" single	3:27
12.	"Maninwhite"	"Just Like Nothing on Earth" single	4:27
13.	"Tomorrow Was the Hereafter"	Non-album single, 1980 (Note: "Tomorrow Was the Hereafter" was released by S.I.S., the official Stranglers fan club, available via mail order throughout the 1980s. The track was recorded in March 1976 at Foel Studio, Wales.)	4:01
Total length:			52:33

2018 CD reissue bonus tracks
No.	Title	Origin	Length
11.	"Who Wants the World?"	Non-album single, 1980	3:14
12.	"The Meninblack (Waiting for 'Em)"	"Who Wants the World?" single	3:36
13.	"Top Secret"	"Thrown Away" single	3:28
14.	"Maninwhite"	"Just Like Nothing on Earth" single	4:26
15.	"Vietnamerica"	IV, 1980	4:03
16.	"Tomorrow Was the Hereafter"	Non-album single	4:02
17.	"G.m.B.H" (extended album version)	IV	3:51
Total length:			67:08

=== 2018 expanded vinyl edition ===
Self-released by the Stranglers, The Gospel According to the Meninblack received a deluxe vinyl reissue in 2018, limited to 1000 numbered copies. The original 10-track album is coupled with a bonus 12-track album, entitled The Meninblack - Revelations, which features non-album singles, associated B-sides, demos, alternate versions, live tracks, and the brass band reworking "Marchinblack".

- Side one and two as per original vinyl edition

Themeninblack - Revelations

Side three
No.	Title	Origin	Length
1.	"Who Wants the World?"	Non-album single
2.	"Bear Cage" (7" single edit)	Non-album single
3.	"Top Secret"	"Thrown Away" single
4.	"Maninwhite"	"Just Like Nothing on Earth" single
5.	"The Meninblack (Waiting for 'Em)"	"Who Wants the World?" single
6.	"The Freezer"	Previously unreleased (Note: "The Freezer" is an early instrumental version of the album track "Manna Machine".)

Side four
No.	Title	Origin	Length
7.	"Who Wants the World?" (demo)	Previously unreleased
8.	"Two Sunspots" (demo)	Previously unreleased
9.	"Thrown Away" (live in Paris, April 2014)	Previously unreleased
10.	"Justlikenothingonearth" (live at Brixton Academy, London, March 2018)	Previously unreleased
11.	"Bear Cage" (live at Brixton Academy, London, March 2018)	Previously unreleased
12.	"Marchinblack"	Previously unreleased (Note: "Marchinblack" is a remix of "Waltzinblack", produced for the intro music to the Stranglers' 2016 "March On Tour".)

== Personnel ==
Credits adapted from the album liner notes, except where noted.

The Stranglers

- Hugh Cornwell ("Hughinblack") – guitar, vocals, concept
- Dave Greenfield ("Daveinblack") – keyboards, vocals
- Jean-Jacques Burnel ("JJinblack") – bass, vocals
- Jet Black ("Jetinblack") – drums, vocals, percussion

Technical

- The Stranglers – producer
- Steve Churchyard – engineer, mixing
- Alan Winstanley – engineer ("Waiting for the Meninblack" and "Two Sunspots")
- Aldo Bocca – engineer ("Just Like Nothing on Earth" and "Turn the Centuries, Turn")
- Laurence Diana – engineer ("Waltzinblack" and "Four Horsemen")
- Leonardo da Vinci – original gatefold sleeve painting
- John Pasche – art direction, design
- Jim Gibson – calligraphy

Bonus tracks

- Baz Warne – guitar, vocals (2014 and 2018 live tracks)
- Jim Macaulay – drums (2014 and 2018 live tracks)
- The Stranglers – producer (all tracks, except 2014 and 2018 live tracks and "Marchinblack")
- Alan Winstanley – producer ("Bear Cage" and "The Meninblack (Waiting for 'Em)"), engineer ("Bear Cage")
- Gary Edwards – engineer ("Who Wants the World")
- Laurence Diana – engineer ("Who Wants the World")
- Steve Churchyard – producer ("G.m.B.H"), engineer ("Top Secret", "Maninwhite", "Vietnamerica", "G.m.B.H", "The Meninblack (Waiting for 'Em)", "Bear Cage")
- Louie Nicastro – producer, mixing (2014 and 2018 live tracks and "Marchinblack")
