= Feline (The Stranglers album) =

1983 studio album by the Stranglers

Studio album by The Stranglers
- Released: 14 January 1983
- Recorded: September 1982
- Studio: ICP Studios in Brussels, Belgium
- Genre: New wave
- Length: 38:31
- Label: Epic
- Producer: The Stranglers; Steve Churchyard

The Stranglers chronology
La Folie (1981)	Feline (1983)	Aural Sculpture (1984)

Singles from Feline
- 1. "European Female" Released: 21 December 1982; 2. "Midnight Summer Dream" Released: 26 February 1983; 3. "Paradise" Released: July 1983

Professional ratings
Review scores
Source	Rating
AllMusic	2.5/5 stars
Smash Hits	8/10

Feline is the seventh studio album by the Stranglers and was released on 14 January 1983 on the Epic record label, their first for the label. The first edition came with a free one-sided 7" single "Aural Sculpture Manifesto". Feline drew heavily on two of the dominant musical influences in Europe of the time, by using primarily acoustic guitars and electronic drums as well as synthesizers. The American edition of the album included the British hit single "Golden Brown" as the closing track on side one of the original vinyl (and the fifth song in on the CD version).

Feline peaked higher than their previous studio album release, La Folie, reaching No. 4 in the UK Albums Chart.

There were three singles released from Feline: the first was "European Female" which reached No. 9 in the UK Singles Chart in January 1983, and was followed by a remixed 7" version of "Midnight Summer Dream" in February (which peaked at No. 35 in the UK). The third and final single released was "Paradise" (released in July 1983) which reached No. 48.

== Reception ==
The album received a mixed reception from fans and critics alike. Some fans embraced the band's new sound, while others felt it wasn't the same band that recorded their debut Rattus Norvegicus in 1977.

Trouser Press described the album as "restrained and dignified, but also lackluster and boring." Alex Ogg, in a retrospective two and a half stars review for AllMusic, wrote, "While not an instant classic, it does repay repeated listening ... Instead of the belligerent tunefulness of yesteryear, the Stranglers were trying to expand their sound and reach. Too often on this lackluster effort, however, it comes across as boring and unengaging.

== Track listing ==
All tracks are written by the Stranglers.

Side A
No.	Title	Length
1.	"Midnight Summer Dream"	6:12
2.	"It's a Small World"	4:34
3.	"Ships That Pass in the Night"	4:06
4.	"European Female (In Celebration of)"	3:59

Side B
No.	Title	Length
5.	"Let's Tango in Paris"	3:12
6.	"Paradise"	3:46
7.	"All Roads Lead to Rome"	3:50
8.	"Blue Sister"	3:57
9.	"Never Say Goodbye"	4:10
Total length:		38:31

Free one-sided 7" disc
No.	Title	Length
1.	"Aural Sculpture^{a}"	3:20

According to the booket accompanying the 40th Anniversary of Feline, the original running order featured "Savage Breast" in place of "All Roads lead to Rome".

2001 CD reissue bonus tracks
No.	Title	Origin	Length
10.	"Savage Breast"	B-side of "European Female"	3:18
11.	"Pawsher^{b}"	B-side of "Paradise"	4:57
12.	"Permission^{c}"	B-side of "Paradise" 12"	4:53
13.	"Midnight Summer Dream/European Female" (live^{d})	B-side of "Nice in Nice" 12", 1986	10:18
14.	"Vladimir and Olga^{e}"	B-side of "Midnight Summer Dream"	3:54
15.	"Aural Sculpture Manifesto"	Feline bonus 7" disc	3:20
Total length:			68:25

- ^a Recorded at Good Earth Studios, London
- ^b Recorded in New York, April 1983
- ^c Recorded in London, June 1983
- ^d Recorded live at The Zenith, Paris, 29 April 1985
- ^e Full title: "(The Strange Circumstances Which Lead To) Vladimir and Olga (Requesting Rehabilitation in a Siberian Health Resort as a Result of Stress in Furthering the People's Policies)". The first of six parts of a "series" about a man named Vladimir. The second part, "Vladimir and Sergei", appears on the non-Stranglers album Fire & Water by Jean-Jacques Burnel and Dave Greenfield. The rest appear as B-sides on various Stranglers singles.

2019 Japanese CD reissue bonus tracks
No.	Title	Origin	Length
10.	"Vladimir and Olga"	B-side of "Midnight Summer Dream"	3:54
11.	"Pawsher"	B-side of "Paradise"	4:57
12.	"Permission"	B-side of "Paradise" 12"	4:53
13.	"Here and There"	B-side of "Skin Deep", 1984	4:22
14.	"Vladimir and the Beast"	B-side of "Skin Deep" 12"	3:53
15.	"Midnight Summer Dream/European Female" (live)	B-side of "Nice in Nice" 12"	10:18

2019 vinyl reissue

Limited to 1,000 numbered copies, the original 9-track album is coupled with a bonus 9-track album, entitled Clawing at the Sky, which features extended 12" mixes, B-sides and unreleased mixes.

- Side A and B as per original vinyl edition

Clawing at the Sky

Side C
No.	Title	Origin	Length
1.	"European Female" (radio edit)	Previously unreleased
2.	"Midnight Summer Dream" (special single edit)	Single and radio version	3:40
3.	"Paradise" (radio edit)	Single and radio version	3:35
4.	"Pãwshēr"	B-side of "Paradise"	4:57
5.	"Permission"	B-side of "Paradise" 12"	4:53

Side D
No.	Title	Origin	Length
6.	"Midnight Summer Dream" (special 12" mix)	"Midnight Summer Dream" 12" version	10:35
7.	"Savage Breast"	B-side of "European Female"	3:18
8.	"Vladimir and Olga"	B-side of "Midnight Summer Dream"	3:54
9.	"Aural Sculpture Manifesto"	Feline bonus 7" disc	3:20

== Personnel ==
Credits adapted from the album liner notes, except where noted.

The Stranglers

- Hugh Cornwell – vocals, guitar
- Jean-Jacques Burnel – bass, vocals (lead vocals on "European Female" and "Paradise")
- Dave Greenfield – keyboards
- Jet Black – drums, percussion

Additional personnel

- Anna Von Stern – backing vocals ("Paradise")
- France Lhermitte – backing vocals ("Paradise")

Technical

- The Stranglers – producer
- Steve Churchyard – producer (except "Aural Sculpture"), engineer
- Tony Visconti – mixing
- Nick Marchant – art direction, design
- Tim Widdal – design

Bonus tracks

- Dagmar Krause – backing vocals ("Here and There")
- The Stranglers – producer (all tracks), mixing ("Vladimir and Olga")
- Steve Churchyard – producer ("Savage Breast")
- Laurie Latham – producer ("Here and There")
- Ted Hayton – mixing ("Midnight Summer Dream/European Female")
- Gary Lucas – engineer ("Vladimir and Olga")
- Glenn Tommey – engineer ("Vladimir and Olga")

== Charts ==
Chart	Peak Position
Dutch Albums Chart	39
German Albums Chart	52
New Zealand Albums Chart	18
Norwegian Albums Chart	16
UK Albums Chart	4
