= No Mercy (The Stranglers song) =

Single by the Stranglers

from the album Aural Sculpture
- B-side: "In One Door"
- Released: 19 November 1984
- Genre: Pop
- Length: 3:39
- Label: Epic
- Songwriters: Hugh Cornwell; Dave Greenfield; Jet Black; Jean-Jacques Burnel
- Producer: Laurie Latham

The Stranglers singles chronology
"Skin Deep" (1984)	"No Mercy" (1984)	"Let Me Down Easy" (1985)

"No Mercy" is a song and single written by Hugh Cornwell, Dave Greenfield, Jet Black and Jean-Jacques Burnel performed by the Stranglers and released in November 1984.

The single made number 37 in the UK Singles Charts in 1984 staying in the charts for eight weeks. The song was performed as part of their set-list in 1985.

== Song and release ==
The song was the second single released from the band's 1984 album Aural Sculpture. One review of the album describes "No Mercy" as “a strong song, with often repeated simple guitar line”. It also notes it as The Stranglers first ever use of backing singers.

The song was released on 1 December 1984 in 7-inch and 12-inch vinyl single formats as well as an ear sculpture shaped picture disc.

== Video ==
The video was shot at St Olave's Hospital in Rotherhithe, London in November 1984. It features the band dressed as doctors and patients. One version of the ending showed a dummy of Hugh Cornwell's body filled with tomato sauce hitting the floor in a bloody heap. Considered too gruesome, the video was never shown with this ending.

== Legacy ==
“No Mercy” is also the title of an authorised biography of The Stranglers, written by David Buckley and issued in 1998.
