= Live at the Hammersmith Odeon '81 =

Live album by The Stranglers
- Released: 1998
- Recorded: 1982
- Genre: Rock
- Label: EMI

The Stranglers live albums chronology
Friday the Thirteenth (1997)	Live at the Hammersmith Odeon '81 (1998)	5 Live 01 (2001)

Professional ratings
Review scores
Source	Rating
Allmusic	2.5/5 stars

Live at the Hammersmith Odeon '81 is a live album by The Stranglers, released by EMI in 1998 as part of the BBC Archive Series. Despite its title, the recording apparently hails from a gig on 8 February 1982.

This concert was recorded by the BBC radio 'In Concert' programme for broadcast but was never broadcast. It remained in the BBC archives for 16 years until it was released on CD in 1998. The CD title was originally released as Live at the Hammersmith Odeon '81 but this was corrected at a later date to '82. The concert was recorded on 8 February 1982 during the second part of The Stranglers' La Folie British tour.

== Track listing ==
1. "Down in the Sewer"
2. "Just Like Nothing on Earth"
3. "Second Coming; Non Stop"
4. "The Man they Love to Hate"
5. "Who Wants the World"
6. "Golden Brown"
7. "How to find True Love and Happiness in the Present Day"
8. "Duchess"
9. "Let Me Introduce You to the Family"
10. "Tramp"
11. "The Raven"
12. "Genetix"
