= Live at the Odeon Hammersmith London =

Live album by Billy Connolly
- Released: 1991
- Recorded: 1991
- Genre: Comedy
- Label: Virgin Records
- Producer: Stuart Epps

Live at the Odeon Hammersmith London is the title of a 1991 comedy album release and a videotaped performance by Billy Connolly. It was recorded and filmed during several of Connolly's performances at the Odeon Hammersmith theatre in London, England, in June 1991 and released in Autumn of that year. The album was released by Virgin Records and produced by Stuart Epps.

Connolly combines observations of current political situations with remembrances of his own childhood during the performance. In the introduction to the CD, Billy refers to Carol Thatcher, who had recently walked out of one of his shows, commenting that it was a pity her brother Mark had not driven her home, referring to how he (Mark) had got lost during the Paris-Dakar Rally in 1982.

Other moments from this show include his recounting of a disastrous, diarrhea-and-sunburn-ridden holiday to Ibiza, a school trip to go swimming in the North Sea, and his discussion of the then-current issue regarding pit bulls.

The video version of the performance is longer and includes a number of routines and segments omitted from the album due to their visual nature.

== Track listing ==
Note: although listed as tracks on the CD, the CD does not actually have track breaks.

1. Doomsday
2. Parliament
3. Pit Bulls
4. Sheep Dogs
5. Doggy Sex
6. Multiple Orgasms
7. Longevity of Sex
8. Algebra
9. Chatting Up Women
10. Crimpolene Suits
11. Underpants
12. Tweed Trousers
13. Scottish Holidays
14. Don't Drink the Water
15. Sunny Spain
16. Fresh Air Fortnight
17. Army Beds
18. Swimming in the North Sea
19. Sumo Wrestlers
20. We Don't Belong in There
21. I Laughed
22. It Goes Away

== Personnel ==
- Video director: Nobby Clark
- Producer: Stuart Epps
- Editor: Paul Naisbitt
