= Dreamtime (The Stranglers album) =

Studio album by the Stranglers
- Released: 27 October 1986
- Recorded: March–April 1986
- Studio: ICP Recording Studios, Brussels; Spaceward Studios, Cambridge; Crescent Studios, Bath; Farmyard Studios, Little Chalfont
- Genre: New wave; pop rock
- Length: 45:53
- Label: Epic
- Producer: The Stranglers; Mike Kemp

The Stranglers chronology
Aural Sculpture (1984)	Dreamtime (1986)	10 (1990)

Singles from Dreamtime
- 1. "Nice in Nice" Released: August 1986; 2. "Always the Sun" Released: October 1986; 3. "Big in America" Released: November 1986; 4. "Shakin' Like a Leaf" Released: February 1987

Dreamtime is the ninth studio album by the Stranglers, released in 1986 by Epic Records. The title track was inspired by a belief of the Indigenous peoples of Australia called Dreamtime.

The single "Always the Sun" peaked at No. 30 in the UK Singles Chart. Dreamtime itself reached No. 16 in the UK Albums Chart, the lowest charting studio album during Hugh Cornwell's recording tenure with the band (1977–90).

Singles released in the UK for this album included "Nice in Nice" (peaked at No. 30), "Always the Sun", "Big in America" (peaked at No. 48) and "Shakin' Like a Leaf" (peaked at No. 58). A fifth single was proposed by the record company, and a remix of the song "Was It You?" was prepared, but it was never released.

== Background ==
The initial recording sessions for Dreamtime began in late 1985 with producer Laurie Latham, who had worked on the band's previous album Aural Sculpture. A few months were spent working on a handful of tracks before the Stranglers and Latham parted company. Latham felt the songs needed more work from the band and had suggested a break in recording. In his 2001 book The Stranglers: Song by Song, guitarist Hugh Cornwell says, "Laurie's comment that our songs weren't ready had left a nasty taste in our mouths because we liked to work with people who were confident in us." The Stranglers therefore decided to continue work on the album with producer Mike Kemp.

Jean-Jacques Burnel (1986): "Well, after three months in a Brussels studio we had only really finished three songs, and these songs aren't even going to be on the album." These three songs were "Shakin' Like a Leaf (single version)", "Norman Normal" (released as a single b-side in 1986), and "You" (released as a single b-side in 1991).

In The Stranglers: Song by Song, Cornwell states that only three songs on Dreamtime were written by the usual songwriting team of himself and Burnel: "Ghost Train", "Mayan Skies" and "Too Precious". The rest were written by the two writers individually. "Always the Sun", "Dreamtime", "Big in America" and "Shakin' Like a Leaf" by Cornwell, and "Was It You?", "You'll Always Reap What You Sow" and "Nice in Nice" by Burnel. Cornwell handles the lead vocals on "You'll Always Reap What You Sow", as the band felt Burnel's "operatic" delivery didn't suit the song.

Dreamtime is the second Stranglers album to feature a three-piece brass section on some tracks. Although credited in the album liner notes for playing drums, Jet Black actually programmed all his drum parts, as he had done on Aural Sculpture.

== Critical reception ==
Professional ratings
Review scores
Source	Rating
AllMusic	1.5/5 stars
Encyclopedia of Popular Music	2/5 stars
The Great Rock Discography	6/10

Contemporary reviews were mixed. A positive review from CMJ New Music Report said that the Stranglers are "a prime example of a band that has streamlined their sound and still retained much of their bite as well as their signature." They described the album as "a smooth production that is pretty, with the ability to be pretty nasty at the same time."

Retrospective reviews were more negative. Alex Ogg of AllMusic wrote, "After Aural Sculpture, this came as a major disappointment. It's not awful, but neither is it in any way essential. ... There are a couple of good songs, like "Always the Sun" and "Nice in Nice" ... but that's simply not enough for a once great band." Ira Robbins of Trouser Press called it an "unfocused time-filler", writing, "Accomplished but bereft of ideas or concept, Dreamtime is a soporific, characterless nightmare."

== Track listing ==
All tracks are written by the Stranglers.

No.	Title	Length
1.	"Always the Sun"	4:51
2.	"Dreamtime"	3:43
3.	"Was It You?"	3:40
4.	"You'll Always Reap What You Sow"	5:13
5.	"Ghost Train"	5:04
6.	"Nice in Nice"	4:03
7.	"Big in America"	3:18
8.	"Shakin' Like a Leaf"	2:36
9.	"Mayan Skies"	3:56
10.	"Too Precious"	6:44
Total length:		45:53

2001 CD reissue bonus tracks
No.	Title	Origin	Length
11.	"Since You Went Away"	"Nice in Nice" single	2:53
12.	"Norman Normal"	"Always the Sun" single	4:33
13.	"Dry Day"	"Big in America" single	5:02
14.	"Hitman"	"Shakin' Like a Leaf" single	4:21
15.	"Was it You?" (7" version)	Previously unreleased	2:57
16.	"Burnham Beeches"	"Always the Sun" (Sunny Side Up Mix) single, 1990	3:50
Total length:			66:23

Notes

- "Norman Normal" is an Aural Sculpture outtake. The rest of the bonus tracks were recorded for Dreamtime.
- The instrumental track "Burnham Beeches" was originally intended as the B-side to the abandoned "Was it You?" single.

== Personnel ==
Credits adapted from the album liner notes, except where noted.

The Stranglers

- Hugh Cornwell - vocals, guitar
- Jean-Jacques Burnel - bass, vocals (lead vocals on "Was It You?", "Nice in Nice", "Since You Went Away" and "Norman Normal")
- Dave Greenfield - keyboards, backing vocals
- Jet Black - drums, percussion

Additional musicians

- Alex Gifford - saxophone
- Hilary Kops - trumpet
- Martin Veysey - trumpet
- B.J. Cole - pedal steel guitar (on "You'll Always Reap What You Sow")
- Simon Morton - additional percussion

Technical

- The Stranglers - producer
- Mike Kemp - producer (except "Mayan Skies"), engineer, mixing
- Ted Hayton - engineer, mixing, mastering
- Owen Morris - engineer
- Jean Luke Epstein - sleeve design

Bonus tracks

- Sil Wilcox - additional guitar (on "Burnham Beeches")
- The Stranglers - producer (except on "Norman Normal")
- Mike Kemp - producer (on "Since You Went Away")
- Laurie Latham - producer (on "Norman Normal")
- Timm Baldwin - mixing (on "Burnham Beeches")
- Tony Bridge - remastering (2001 reissue)

== Charts ==
Chart (1986–1987)	Peak Position
Australian Albums (Kent Music Report)	64
Canadian Albums (RPM)	83
Dutch Albums (Album Top 100)	60
New Zealand Albums (RMNZ)	45
UK Albums (OCC)	16
US (Billboard 200)	172
