= Thrown Away (song) =

Single by The Stranglers

from the album The Gospel According to the Meninblack
- B-side: "Top Secret"
- Released: 19 January 1981 (UK)
- Recorded: Musicland Studios
- Genre: New wave, post-punk
- Length: 3:31
- Label: Liberty Records
- Songwriter(s): The Stranglers
- Producer(s): Alan Winstanley

The Stranglers singles chronology
"Who Wants the World?" (1980)	"Thrown Away" (1981)	"Just Like Nothing On Earth" (1981)

"Thrown Away" is a 1981 song by The Stranglers. It was the first single from their concept album, The Gospel According to the Meninblack. This was The Stranglers' attempt at a Euro disco song, and the band were confident it would be a hit. However, despite an appearance on Top of the Pops, it could only reach No. 42 in the UK Singles Chart, and continued a two-year period of relative commercial decline for the band.
