= Always the Sun =

1986 song by the Stranglers

Single by The Stranglers

from the album Dreamtime
- B-side: "Norman Normal"
- Released: 6 October 1986
- Recorded: 1985
- Genre: New wave; pop rock
- Length: 4:51 (Album Version); 4:05 (Single Version)
- Label: Epic
- Songwriters: Hugh Cornwell; Jean-Jacques Burnel; Dave Greenfield; Jet Black
- Producer: The Stranglers

The Stranglers singles chronology
"Nice in Nice" (1986)	"Always the Sun" (1986)	"Big in America" (1986)

Music video
- "Always the Sun" on YouTube

"Always the Sun" is a song by the English rock band the Stranglers, first released as a single on 6 October 1986 by Epic Records, and is the second single from the band's ninth studio album, Dreamtime (1986). A remixed version was released as a single on 24 December 1990. Both versions were Top 30 hits in the United Kingdom. "Always the Sun" was released in October 1986 in four different formats: a seven-inch single, shaped seven-inch picture disc, twelve-inch single, and as a double seven-inch single pack.

== Reception ==
Despite radio play and much hype, it only reached no. 30 in the UK Singles Chart. However, it was a hit throughout Europe (no. 15 in France, 16 in Ireland) and nearly broke the Stranglers in the United States through radio play. The song also reached no. 21 in Australia.

Lead vocalist, and lead guitarist Hugh Cornwell mentioned in his book The Stranglers Song by Song that he thought it could have been as big as "Golden Brown". He recalls going to CBS for a midweek prediction on how the song would chart and was amazed at the bad news. He also wrote "We'd given CBS something great to work with and I could see in this guy's face that he knew he hadn't delivered", giving the impression that Cornwell felt that CBS was to blame for this poor position.

== Video ==
The video for "Always the Sun" showed the Stranglers performing in a dark room, all on separate small stages with Hugh Cornwell on the ground. During the song, after Cornwell sings "Who has the fun? Is it always a man with a gun?" he takes out a gun and shoots the Aztec Sun Calendar Wheel, which then shatters.

The cover artwork of the single shows the Stranglers' band logo and the Aztec Sun Calendar Wheel glyph on a black background.

== Track listings ==
=== 7": Epic / SOLAR 1 (UK) ===
Side one

1. "Always the Sun" – 4:04

Side two

1. "Norman Normal" – 4:30

=== 7": Epic / 34-06990 (US) ===
Side one

1. "Always the Sun" – 3:55

Side two

1. "Mayan Skies" – 3:52

=== 12": Epic / SOLAR T1 (UK) ===
Side one

1. "Always the Sun (Hot Mix)" – 5:58

Side two

1. "Norman Normal" – 4:30
2. "Souls (Live)" – 3:18

=== 12" Promo: Epic / EAS 02573 (US) ===
Side one

1. "Always the Sun (Hot Mix)" – 5:58

Side two

1. "Always the Sun (LP Version)" – 4:48
2. "Always the Sun (Single Edit)" – 4:00

=== Limited Edition Double 7": Epic / SOLAR D1 (UK) ===
Disc one
Side one

1. "Always the Sun" – 4:04

Side two

1. "Norman Normal" – 4:30

Disc two
Side one

1. "Nice in Nice" – 3:44

Side two

1. "Since You Went Away" – 2:52

== Charts ==
=== Weekly charts ===
Chart (1986–87)	Peak position
Australia (Kent Music Report)	21
France (SNEP)	15
Irish Singles Chart	16
Italy Airplay (Music & Media)	9
Netherlands (Single Top 100)	42
UK Singles Chart	30

== Issue with "Big in America" ==
The two tracks from the seven-inch single were reissued in December 1986, as half of a double seven-inch release of the band's next single, "Big in America".

== Sunny Side Up Mix ==
"Always the Sun (Sunny Side Up Mix)"

Single by the Stranglers

from the album Greatest Hits 1977–1990
- B-side: "Burnham Beeches"
- Released: 24 December 1990
- Recorded: 1990
- Genre: Rock; new wave
- Length: 3:56
- Label: Epic
- Songwriters: Hugh Cornwell; Jean Jacques Burnel; Dave Greenfield; Jet Black
- Producer: The Stranglers

The Stranglers singles chronology
"The Sweet Smell of Success" (1990)	"Always the Sun (Sunny Side Up Mix)" (1990)	"Golden Brown (remix)" (1991)

Following Hugh Cornwell's departure from the band in August 1990, Epic Records decided to release a greatest hits compilation album. To promote this compilation, a remix of "Always the Sun" was released as a single on 24 December 1990, Christmas Eve. The remix consisted of extra guitar work from new guitarist John Ellis and a slight variation in the music, although Cornwell's original vocals were still used. Like the original, the single got good airplay, but peaked at no. 29, one place higher than the original. Cornwell stated in his book Song by Song that he was not angered by the remix, asserting that he was privileged that Epic Records thought "Always the Sun" was good enough to be re-released, and feeling that the band changed little of the original recordings.

=== Track listings ===
7" Single/cassette single

1. "Always the Sun (Sunny Side Up Mix)" – 3:56
2. "Burnham Beeches" – 3:40

12" Single

1. "Always the Sun (Long Hot Sunny Side Up Mix)"
2. "Burnham Beeches"
3. "Straighten Out" (live)

CD Single

1. "Always the Sun (Sunny Side Up Mix)"
2. "Nuclear Device" (live)
3. "All Day and All of the Night" (live)
4. "Punch and Judy" (live)

=== Charts ===
Chart (1991)	Peak position
UK Singles (OCC)	29
UK Airplay (Music Week)	14

== Other versions ==
A live version of the song was included on the album All Live and All of the Night in February 1988.
