= Bear Cage =

Single by The Stranglers
- B-side: "Shah Shah A Go Go"
- Released: 7 March 1980 (UK)
- Genre: Punk rock, post-punk
- Length: 2.55
- Label: United Artists
- Songwriter(s): The Stranglers
- Producer(s): Alan Winstanley, The Stranglers

The Stranglers singles chronology
"Nuclear Device (The Wizard of Aus)" (1979)	"Bear Cage" (1980)	"Who Wants the World?" (1980)

"Bear Cage" is a 1980 single by The Stranglers. The non-album track (although later released on reissues of The Raven) reached number 36 in the UK Singles Chart.
