= The Raven (The Stranglers album) =

Album by The Stranglers

Studio album by the Stranglers
- Released: 21 September 1979
- Recorded: June 1979
- Studio: Pathé Marconi Studios, Paris; Mixed at AIR Studios, London
- Genre: Post-punk; new wave
- Length: 41:11
- Label: United Artists
- Producer: The Stranglers; Alan Winstanley

The Stranglers chronology
Black and White (1978)	The Raven (1979)	The Gospel According to the Meninblack (1981)

Singles from The Raven
- 1. "Duchess" Released: 10 August 1979; 2. "Nuclear Device (The Wizard of Aus)" Released: 5 October 1979; 3. "Don't Bring Harry" Released: 9 November 1979

Professional ratings
Review scores
Source	Rating
AllMusic	3.5/5 stars
The Encyclopedia of Popular Music	3/5 stars
The Great Rock Discography	6/10
Record Collector	5/5 stars
Record Mirror	5/5 stars
Smash Hits	6½/10
Sounds	5/5 stars

The Raven is the fourth studio album by English rock band the Stranglers, released on 21 September 1979, through record label United Artists.

== Background ==
The first two songs, much of the artwork (the band is shown standing on the prow of a Viking longship on the back cover) and the album title refer to Norse mythology. The album deals with a variety of issues, including Japanese ritual suicide ("Ice"), heroin use ("Don't Bring Harry"), the Iranian Revolution ("Shah Shah a Go Go") and genetic engineering ("Genetix").

"Dead Loss Angeles" features guitarist Hugh Cornwell playing bass guitar in conjunction with bassist Jean-Jacques Burnel, who wrote the song's heavy bass line. No lead or rhythm guitars feature on the track, whose lyrics were written by Cornwell about his experiences in the United States.

The Raven is the first Stranglers album not produced by Martin Rushent, instead being produced by the band with engineer Alan Winstanley.

== Release ==
The Raven was released in September 1979. It reached No. 4 in the UK albums chart, remaining in the chart for eight weeks.

The album was originally released with a limited-edition 3D cover. Another limited edition had to be created when the band was forced to remove an image of Joh Bjelke-Petersen from the inner sleeve artwork. Bjelke-Petersen was the subject of the album's sixth track, "Nuclear Device (The Wizard of Aus)".

"Duchess" was the first and most successful single from the album, released on 10 August 1979 and reaching No. 14 on the UK Singles Chart. "Nuclear Device (The Wizard of Aus)" was the second single released; this reached No. 36 on the same chart. A four-track EP, "Don't Bring Harry", was released in November. In addition to the title track and a live version of "In the Shadows", it also included "Wired" (taken from Cornwell and Robert Williams' forthcoming album Nosferatu) and a live version of "Crabs" (a track from Burnel's solo album, Euroman Cometh). It reached No. 41.

== Track listing ==
All tracks are written by the Stranglers.

Side one
No.	Title	Lead vocals	Length
1.	"Longships"	Instrumental	1:10
2.	"The Raven"	Jean-Jacques Burnel	5:13
3.	"Dead Loss Angeles"	Hugh Cornwell	2:24
4.	"Ice"	Burnel	3:26
5.	"Baroque Bordello"	Cornwell	3:50
6.	"Nuclear Device (The Wizard of Aus)"	Cornwell	3:32

Side two
No.	Title	Lead vocals	Length
7.	"Shah Shah a Go Go"	Cornwell	4:50
8.	"Don't Bring Harry"	Burnel	4:09
9.	"Duchess"	Cornwell	2:30
10.	"Meninblack"	Burnel	4:48
11.	"Genetix"	Dave Greenfield	5:16
Total length:			41:11

2001 CD reissue bonus tracks (EMI)
No.	Title	Origin	Length
12.	"Bear Cage"	Non-album single, 1980	2:50
13.	"Fools Rush Out"	B-side of "Duchess" single	2:09
14.	"N'Emmenes Pas Harry"	Non-album single (France)	4:14
15.	"Yellowcake UF_{6}"	B-side of "Nuclear Device (The Wizard of Aus)" single	2:55
Total length:			53:24

2016 expanded vinyl edition

Self-released by the Stranglers, The Raven received a deluxe vinyl reissue in 2016, limited to 1500 numbered copies. The original 11-track album is coupled with a bonus 9-track album, entitled Treasures Captured, which features B-sides, alternate versions and radio sessions.

- Side one and two as per original vinyl edition

The Raven: Treasures Captured

Side three
No.	Title	Origin	Length
1.	"Fools Rush Out"	B-side of "Duchess" single	2:11
2.	"N'Emmenes Pas Harry"	Non-album single (France)	4:16
3.	"G.m.b.H."	IV, 1980	3:53
4.	"Vietnamerica"	IV	4:11
5.	"Yellowcake UF_{6}"	B-side of "Nuclear Device (The Wizard of Aus)" single	3:00

Side four
No.	Title	Origin	Length
6.	"Shah Shah a Go Go" (long version)	"Bear Cage" 12" double A-side	5:23
7.	"Bear Cage" (long version)	Non-album 12" single	6:34
8.	"Nuclear Device"/"Genetix" (BBC Radio 1 session, 24 January 1982)	The Radio 1 Sessions - The Evening Show, 1989	8:14
Total length:			37:42

2018 CD reissue bonus tracks (Parlophone)

(Associated recordings)
No.	Title	Origin	Length
12.	"Fools Rush Out"	B-side of "Duchess" single	2:12
13.	"Yellowcake UF_{6}"	B-side of "Nuclear Device (The Wizard of Aus)" single	2:59
14.	"In the Shadows" (live at Hope and Anchor, London, 1977)	"Don't Bring Harry" EP	4:48
15.	"N'Emmenes Pas Harry"	Non-album single (France)	4:17
16.	"Bear Cage"	Non-album 7" single	2:50
17.	"Bear Cage" (12" version)	Non-album 12" single	6:31
18.	"Shah Shah a Go Go" (12" version)	"Bear Cage" 12" double A-side	5:21
Total length:			70:24

== Personnel ==
The Stranglers

- Hugh Cornwell – guitar, vocals, second bass ("Dead Loss Angeles")
- Jean-Jacques Burnel – bass, vocals
- Dave Greenfield – keyboards, vocals
- Jet Black – drums

Technical

- The Stranglers – production, cover concept
- Alan Winstanley – production, engineering, mixing
- Steve Churchyard – mixing
- George "Porky" Peckham – mastering
- Denis "BilBo" Blackham – mastering
- John Pasche – sleeve design coordination
- Shoot That Tiger! – inner sleeve design
- Chris Ryan – sleeve photography (2D cover photo)
- Toppan – sleeve photography (3D cover photo)
- Paul Cox – sleeve photography (back cover photo)
- Allan Ballard – sleeve photography (inner bag photo)

Bonus tracks

- The Stranglers – production (all tracks, except "Nuclear Device"/"Genetix")
- Alan Winstanley – production, engineering (all tracks, except "G.m.b.H.", "Vietnamerica" and "Nuclear Device"/"Genetix")
- Steve Churchyard – production ("G.m.b.H."), engineering ("Bear Cage", "Vietnamerica", "G.m.b.H.")
- Dale Griffin – production ("Nuclear Device"/"Genetix")
