= Skin Deep (The Stranglers song) =

Single by The Stranglers

from the album Aural Sculpture
- B-side: "Here and There"
- Released: 24 September 1984
- Recorded: Brussels, 1984
- Genre: Pop; soft rock
- Length: 3:55 (7" single/album); 7:12 (12" version)
- Label: Epic
- Songwriters: Hugh Cornwell; Dave Greenfield; Jean-Jacques Burnel; Jet Black
- Producer: The Stranglers

The Stranglers singles chronology
"Paradise" (1983)	"Skin Deep" (1984)	"No Mercy" (1984)

"Skin Deep" is a song by British band the Stranglers, released in September 1984 as the lead single from the album Aural Sculpture.

The shimmering and melodic single restored the band to the UK top 20 after its previous two single releases (from the album Feline) had stalled at numbers 48 and 35. "Skin Deep" peaked at No. 11 in Australia and Ireland.

The music video consists of the band performing the song, interspersed with shots of a snake crawling over a person and the band removing face masks towards the end of the video, finishing with a shot of the aural sculpture featured on the parent album cover.

== Track listings ==
=== 7" singles ===
A. "Skin Deep" the – 3:55
B. "Here and There" – 4:21

=== 12" single ===
A. "Skin Deep" (Extended Version) – 7:12
B1. "Here and There" – 4:21
B2. "Vladimir and the Beast (Part III)" – 3:55

== Chart performance ==
=== Weekly charts ===
Chart (1984/1985)	Peak position
Australia (Kent Music Report)	11
Belgian Singles Chart	17
Dutch Top 40	21
Irish Singles Chart	11
New Zealand Singles Chart	19
UK Singles Chart	15

=== Year-end charts ===
Chart (1985)	Position
Australia (Kent Music Report)	97
