= European Female =

Single by The Stranglers

from the album Feline
- B-side: "Savage Breast"
- Released: 1982
- Label: Epic
- Songwriters: Hugh Cornwell; Dave Greenfield; Jean-Jacques Burnel; Jet Black
- Producer: The Stranglers

The Stranglers singles chronology
"Strange Little Girl" (1982)	"European Female" (1982)	"Midnight Summer Dream" (1983)

"European Female" is a single by the British band The Stranglers, released in 1982. It is taken from the album Feline where it features under its full title "The European Female (In Celebration Of)". The track features bassist Jean-Jacques Burnel on lead vocals.

The single was the Stranglers' first for Epic Records. It reached number nine in the UK Singles Chart, where it spent six weeks.

Chart (1983)	Peak position
Ireland (IRMA)	9
UK Singles (OCC)	9
