= Hans Wärmling =

Swedish keyboardist and songwriter (1943–1995)

- Born: 22 July 1943
- Origin: Gothenburg, Sweden
- Died: 12 October 1995 (aged 52) Härryda, Gothenburg, Sweden
- Genres: Rock, new wave
- Occupations: Musician, songwriter
- Instruments: Guitar, piano, saxophone
- Years active: 1964–1975
- Formerly of: The Jackie Fountains; Johnny Sox; The Stranglers

Hans Axel Wärmling (22 July 1943 – 12 October 1995) was a Swedish musician and songwriter, and was a founding member and keyboardist of the British rock band the Stranglers. He co-wrote their 1982 UK Top 10 release "Strange Little Girl". He drowned in a boating accident in 1995.

== Early years ==
=== The Jackie Fountains ===
Hans Wärmling was the guitar player in a rhythm and blues band called the Jackie Fountains, that formed in 1964 and played in the Gnesta area of Sweden until 1967. His brother, Peter Wärmling, became their manager and provided rehearsal facilities. In this band he was known by the nickname of 'Hasse'.

=== Johnny Sox ===
In 1972, a young Hugh Cornwell had travelled to Lund in Sweden and took up a position in the local university hospital whilst studying for a PhD in biochemistry. Cornwell became friends with Hans Wärmling who happened to be working as a nurse at the same hospital.

Wärmling suggested that Hugh Cornwell could provide English lyrics to some of the 500 songs that he had recorded on a reel to reel tape recorder and they quickly became close friends. Other musicians (Jan Knutsson, Gyrth Godwin and 'Chicago Mike') were recruited to form the band 'Johnny Sox'. In 1973, Cornwell decided to end his academic studies in Sweden and moved back to London, persuading the other members of 'Johnny Sox' to move with him although Wärmling chose to remain in his home country.

'Johnny Sox' continued to play in London pubs and clubs until mid-1974 with Jet Black joining the band to replace the original drummer 'Chicago Mike'. Jean-Jacques Burnel had also joined the band line-up after being given a lift by Gyrth Godwin. Relations within the band deteriorated and both Godwin and Knutsson decided to return to Sweden. Cornwell convinced both Black and Burnel that they needed Hans Wärmling to fill the gap who, once contacted, came to London immediately.

== The Stranglers ==
With the line-up of Black, Burnel, Cornwell and Wärmling the band renamed themselves the Guildford Stranglers and began playing gigs again in pubs and clubs, mainly playing cover versions of MOR pop tunes. Wärmling was far from happy with this musical direction; in particular, he objected to having to learn and play "Tie a Yellow Ribbon" and he suddenly left the band in 1975, leaving the bus while they were travelling to a gig at a bar mitzvah in North London. "Hasse played for a month or so with new musicians after the split, but then the work permit expired and he had to leave England." Wärmling and Cornwell did not meet again until 1994. His position as keyboard player was soon filled by Dave Greenfield who had answered an advert placed in the Melody Maker.

== Song writing credits and discography ==
Hans Wärmling is co-credited with writing the music for three early (1974) Stranglers tracks: "Wasted", "My Young Dreams", and "Strange Little Girl". These tracks with Wärmling playing keyboards can be heard on the compilation album The Early Years '74 '75 '76 Rare Live and Unreleased. Most notably "Strange Little Girl", re-released with revised lyrics and Greenfield on keyboards reached number seven in the UK Singles Chart in 1982. "Strange Little Girl" was later released, as a cover version by Tori Amos.

== Death ==
Hans Wärmling died in a boating accident near Gothenburg in 1995.
