= Strange Little Girl =

1982 song by the Stranglers

Single by the Stranglers

from the album The Collection 1977–1982
- B-side: "Cruel Garden"
- Released: 12 July 1982
- Genre: Psychedelic pop
- Length: 2:40
- Label: Liberty
- Songwriters: Jet Black; Jean Burnel; Hugh Cornwell; Dave Greenfield; Hans Wärmling
- Producers: The Stranglers; Steve Churchyard

The Stranglers singles chronology
"La Folie" (1982)	"Strange Little Girl" (1982)	"European Female" (1983)

"Strange Little Girl" is a song by the English rock band the Stranglers, originally written in 1974 and re-recorded and released in the UK in 1982 as their last single while signed to Liberty Records (part of EMI). By the time of release, the band had already decided to leave the label for Epic Records, and this last single was part of the severance deal, along with the compilation album, The Collection 1977–1982.

== Recording and release ==
The band revealed that the song had originally been written in 1974 and was submitted to EMI years before the band had a recording contract. EMI had rejected the band on the basis of that demo. "Strange Little Girl" went on to peak at No. 7 in the UK Singles Chart in August 1982.

The music video featured the band and a group of girl punks in London. Locations included Liverpool Street, and in and around Cambridge Circus.

== Track listing ==
A. "Strange Little Girl" – 2:40
B. "Cruel Garden" – 2:21

== Tori Amos version ==
"Strange Little Girl"

Single by Tori Amos

from the album Strange Little Girls
- B-side: "After All"; "Only Women Bleed"
- Released: 6 August 2001
- Studio: Martian Engineering (Cornwall)
- Length: 3:50
- Label: Atlantic
- Songwriters: Jean Burnel; Hugh Cornwell; Brian Duffy; David Greenfield; Hans Wärmling
- Producer: Tori Amos

Tori Amos singles chronology
"Concertina" (2001)	"Strange Little Girl" (2001)	"A Sorta Fairytale" (2002)

American singer-songwriter Tori Amos recorded a version of "Strange Little Girl" and released it as the first and only single from her 2001 concept album, Strange Little Girls.

=== Song information ===
The single was serviced to US radio on 6 and 7 August 2001, and a commercial single for "Strange Little Girl" was released only in Germany. Unlike some of her other previously rare tracks, the two B-sides for the single ("After All" and "Only Women Bleed") were not included on the Tori Amos compilation A Piano: The Collection. They were later included on the 2026 expanded edition of the Strange Little Girls album.

=== Music video ===
A music video was filmed for "Strange Little Girl". However, it has never been released officially (this is one of two videos that were excluded from her music video collection, Fade to Red, the other being "Glory of the '80s").

The video takes place in a sort of crop field, with a young girl being chased by a wolf. Between the shots of the crops, the girl suddenly becomes Amos (this age shift goes back and forth throughout the video). After running, she discovers a house, in which she takes refuge. The wolf tries to get inside, but it cannot—in fact, at one point, the wolf is almost as large as the house. Conversely, near the end of the video, the wolf shrinks enough to be able to squeeze under the door. Amos then takes the wolf in her hand.

=== Track listing ===
German single

1. "Strange Little Girl" – 3:50
2. "After All" – 4:42
3. "Only Women Bleed" – 3:34
