= Who Wants the World? =

Single by The Stranglers
- B-side: "The Meninblack (Waiting For 'Em)"
- Released: 29 May 1980 (UK)
- Genre: Punk rock, post-punk
- Length: 3.16
- Label: United Artists
- Songwriter(s): The Stranglers
- Producer(s): Alan Winstanley

The Stranglers singles chronology
"Bear Cage" (1980)	"Who Wants the World?" (1980)	"Thrown Away" (1981)

"Who Wants the World?" is a 1980 single by The Stranglers. The song, about alien visitation to Earth, is regarded as a precursor to The Gospel According to the Meninblack album - which explored similar concepts in more depth. Like the band's previous single, "Bear Cage", it was a non-album track. "Who Wants the World?" peaked at No. 39 in the UK Singles Chart.
