= Nuclear Device (The Wizard of Aus) =

Single by The Stranglers

from the album The Raven
- B-side: "Yellowcake UF_{6}"
- Released: 5 October 1979
- Genre: Punk rock, post-punk
- Length: 3:33
- Label: United Artists
- Songwriter(s): The Stranglers
- Producer(s): Alan Winstanley; The Stranglers

The Stranglers singles chronology
"Duchess (The Stranglers song)" (1979)	"Nuclear Device (The Wizard of Aus)" (1979)	"Bear Cage" (1980)

"Nuclear Device (The Wizard of Aus)" is a 1979 single by British band The Stranglers. The second single from their album The Raven, it peaked at No. 36 on the UK Singles Chart.

Hugh Cornwell stated in Song by Song that the song was written about the then Premier of Queensland, Joh Bjelke-Petersen. It also makes references to gerrymandering, and genetic mutation in animals.

It was later released on the compilation Singles (The UA Years), with a live recordings on Live at the Apollo 2010, All Live and All of the Night and Saturday Night, Sunday Morning.
