= Aural Sculpture =

Studio album by The Stranglers
- Released: 5 November 1984
- Recorded: 1984
- Studio: ICP Recording Studios, Brussels
- Genre: New wave; pop rock
- Length: 43:10
- Label: Epic
- Producer: Laurie Latham; The Stranglers

The Stranglers chronology
Feline (1983)	Aural Sculpture (1984)	Dreamtime (1986)

Singles from Aural Sculpture
- 1. "Skin Deep" Released: 24 September 1984; 2. "No Mercy" Released: 19 November 1984; 3. "Let Me Down Easy" Released: 4 February 1985

Professional ratings
Review scores
Source	Rating
AllMusic	4.5/5 stars
Encyclopedia of Popular Music	3/5 stars
The Great Rock Discography	6/10

Aural Sculpture is the eighth studio album by the Stranglers, released in November 1984 by Epic Records. It was also the name given to a one-sided 7-inch single given free with a limited number of copies of their Feline album in 1983. The "Aural Sculpture Manifesto" on the 7" single was played before the Stranglers appeared on stage during concerts during both the 1983 "Feline" tour and the 1985 "Aural Sculpture" tour.

The album featured acoustic guitar as well as a three-piece horn section (trumpet, trombone and saxophone). The horns were the suggestion of producer Laurie Latham, who was brought in after Epic Records rejected the initial demos of the album tracks.

Aural Sculpture reached number 14 in the UK Albums Chart in November 1984. There were three singles released from the album: "Skin Deep" (No. 15 in the UK Singles Chart), "No Mercy" (No. 37 in the UK Singles Chart) and "Let Me Down Easy" (No. 48 in the UK Chart). All were accompanied by 12" single versions, while "No Mercy" had a further two format releases in picture disc and EP.

== Recording sessions ==
In mid-October 1983 the band returned to the UK from their European tour and began preparing their next album. In addition, on 11 November, Jean-Jacques Burnel and Dave Greenfield released their solo album Fire & Water (Ecoutez Vos Murs) which had been recorded during July and August at Spaceward Studios in Stretham and was a soundtrack to the movie Ecoutez vos murs by Vincent Coudanne; in December, Burnel and Greenfield together with Coudanne returned to the studio to mix the recordings for the film score. Burnel also collaborated with Norwegian artist Beranek in winter 1983/84. In February 1984, the band staged an event at Trafalgar Square, where they undertook a six-hour photo session with a 13 foot high ear sculpture manufactured by artist John King; shots from this event by American photographer, John Kisch, were used for the artwork of the album cover.

The band chose ICP Studios in Brussels, a studio Burnel had used before with Belgian band Polyphonic Size; they spent three weeks in February and March 1984 to record the album; on the tenth day of recording, eight songs had been finished and the band were working on the track "Punch and Judy". Originally, an album release date around May 1984 had been planned, but as the band continued to write more songs, a second recording session at ICP Studios was booked for June/July. Moreover, the record company criticized the production of the tapes, to which Hugh Cornwell agreed: "I hadn't been happy with how the guitars were sounding, and the vocals didn't sound right, either." The record company insisted on the use of a producer to finish the album; after considering Marvin Gaye (who then was killed on 1 April) and Eddie Grant, the band followed the record company's suggestion to hire the producer Laurie Latham.

During the break between recording sessions, in mid-March 1984 Jean-Jacques Burnel took up the offer to join Japanese band A.R.B. and recorded and toured with them in Japan for five weeks. Drummer Jet Black spend the bank holiday weekend of 27/28 May at Right Track Studios in Bristol, producing and playing on the single My Young Dreams by A Marriage of Convenience. Meanwhile, Dave Greenfield went to Brussels with Laurie Latham for a tentative session; Cornwell: "At our first meeting with Laurie, he listened to what we'd done and said, 'I can do something with Skin Deep. Let me try that first, and if you're happy with how it sounds then we'll do the album.' He took Dave to Brussels to work on Skin Deep because he had a few ideas for the keyboards, and what they put together sounded brilliant."

The band then finished the album in June and July 1984 during the second recording session at ICP Studios in Brussels with producer Laurie Latham. Songs from the first session were remixed and partially re-recorded, of which only four were chosen for the final album (Skin Deep, North Winds, Punch and Judy, and Souls); the bulk of the album tracks were newly written songs recorded during this second session. Burnel: "Aural Sculpture was a labour of love between Laurie and Hugh to be honest. Dave and I were almost secondary and we weren't seeing so much of the others, apart from crossing paths in the studio." On three songs (Ice Queen, Punch and Judy, and Mad Hatter), Latham added a brass section who were especially flown in to Brussels and completed their contribution in one long studio session from 11 p.m. to 5 p.m. the following morning. Backing vocalists were also used on three songs (Let Me Down Easy, No Mercy, and Mad Hatter), who taped their parts in a long one-day session.

After finishing the album, Burnel spent the whole month of August 1984 at his home in Montauroux caring for his terminally ill father Roger Burnel who finally died on 30 August 1984. Cornwell and Burnel had written the song Let Me Down Easy about Burnel's dying father: "It wasn't the best time for me with my Dad's illness. I wasn't too complicit in the recording [of the album] and was a bit detached at the time."

== Critical reception ==
In Classic Rock's "The Stranglers: A Guide to Their Best Albums", Rob Hughes wrote that Aural Sculpture was "a welcoming upgrade from the icy electronic motifs of predecessor Feline, offering instead a warm textural palette of acoustic guitars, ripe harmonies and a three-piece horn section." He added that "die-hard fans may baulk at the lack of aggressive machismo, but there's much to admire in the burnished melodies of "No Mercy", "Souls" and "Spain"." Jack Rabid, writing for AllMusic, welcomed the band's gradual shift from their early albums' "sheer unrepentant, harsh rock" to the "lithe little pop songs" on Aural Sculpture, with Hugh Cornwell "now cooing instead of growling". Rabid wrote, "You just never thought they could transition to this contrasting style so well."

Critic Adrian Denning noted that on Aural Sculpture the Stranglers were "pursuing a continuing path towards sensual, sincere and introspective pop/rock - any trace of their punk era gone altogether." Ira Robbins of Trouser Press felt that the album contains several strong tracks, writing, "Although not fully satisfying, Aural Sculpture has enough quality merchandise to make it a worthwhile purchase."

== Releases ==
The cassette version of the album had a ZX Spectrum computer program called Aural Quest at the end of the tape, which could be loaded using the Spectrum's usual tape loading method. The program was an adventure game written using a framework called The Quill by Mike Turner of Star Dreams and keyboardist Dave Greenfield who had known Turner since the age of 11. Preceding the program was a short explanation of the following squeal voiced by Greenfield.

The 1999 Japanese CD reissue by Epic included six bonus tracks: "In One Door", "Hot Club", "Achilles Heel", "Place de Victoires", "Vladimir Goes to Havana" and "The Aural Sculpture Manifesto". Epic released a remastered edition in 2001 with eight bonus tracks, some of which featured on the Japanese reissue. In 2011, the Dutch vinyl-only label Music On Vinyl released a remastered two-disc edition with ten bonus tracks. A remastered HDCD limited Collector's Edition was released by Epic in 2014, in a vinyl replica-format with cardboard jacket, paper inner sleeve and a black, groove-texture disc with a replica label. In 2019, the band self-released a 35th anniversary two-disc vinyl edition, individually hand numbered and limited to 1000 copies. The second 14 track bonus album contains B-sides and live recordings.

== Track listing ==
All tracks are written by the Stranglers.

Side one
No.	Title	Length
1.	"Ice Queen"	4:01
2.	"Skin Deep"	3:53
3.	"Let Me Down Easy"	4:10
4.	"No Mercy"	3:38
5.	"North Winds"	4:03

Side two
No.	Title	Length
6.	"Uptown"	2:57
7.	"Punch and Judy"	3:46
8.	"Spain"	4:13
9.	"Laughing"	4:12
10.	"Souls"	2:41
11.	"Mad Hatter"	4:00
Total length:		43:10

=== 2001 CD reissue bonus tracks ===
No.	Title	Origin	Length
12.	"Here and There"	"Skin Deep" 7"	4:21
13.	"In One Door"	"No Mercy" 7"	2:53
14.	"Head on the Line"	"No Mercy" EP	3:08
15.	"Achilles Heel"	"Let Me Down Easy" 7"	2:54
16.	"Hot Club" (Riot Mix)	"No Mercy" EP	3:04
17.	"Place de Victoires^{a}"	"Let Me Down Easy" 12"	4:09
18.	"Vladimir and the Beast (part 3)^{b}"	"Skin Deep" 12"	3:56
19.	"Vladimir Goes to Havana^{b}"	"Let Me Down Easy" 12" Collectors Edition	5:28
Total length:			72:04

- ^aInstrumental version of "Let Me Down Easy".
- ^bParts 3 and 4 of the "Vladimir" series. The 5th part, "Viva Vlad!", appears as the B-side of the cover single "All Day and All of the Night".

=== 2011 expanded vinyl edition ===
The original 11-track album is coupled with a bonus 10-track album, which features B-sides and extended 12" mixes.

- Side one and two as per original vinyl edition

Side three
No.	Title	Origin	Length
1.	"Skin Deep" (Extended Mix)	"Skin Deep" 12"	7:12
2.	"Here and There"	"Skin Deep" 7"	4:21
3.	"In One Door"	"No Mercy" 7"	2:55
4.	"No Mercy" (Cement Mix)	"No Mercy" 12"	6:47
5.	"Vladimir and the Beast"	"Skin Deep" 12"	3:53

Side four
No.	Title	Origin	Length
6.	"Let Me Down Easy" (Extended Mix)	"Let Me Down Easy" 12"	6:33
7.	"Head on the Line"	"No Mercy" EP	4:53
8.	"Achilles Heel"	"Let Me Down Easy" 7"	2:55
9.	"Place de Victoires"	"Let Me Down Easy" 12"	4:10
10.	"Vladimir Goes to Havana"	"Let Me Down Easy" 12" Collectors Edition	5:28
Total length:			91:26

=== 2019 expanded vinyl edition ===
The original 11-track album is coupled with a bonus 14-track album, entitled Shrouded in Black, which features B-sides plus 9 live tracks, most of which are previously unreleased.

- Side one and two as per original vinyl edition

Shrouded in Black

Side three
No.	Title	Origin	Length
1.	"No Mercy" (live at Zurich Volkhaus, Switzerland, 14 April 1985)	Previously unreleased
2.	"Souls" (live at Zurich Volkhaus, Switzerland, 14 April 1985)	Previously unreleased
3.	"Let Me Down Easy" (live at Zurich Volkhaus, Switzerland, 14 April 1985)	Previously unreleased
4.	"Punch and Judy" (live at Zurich Volkhaus, Switzerland, 14 April 1985)	Previously unreleased
5.	"Spain" (live at Reading Festival 30 August 1987)	All Live and All of the Night, 1988
6.	"Here and There"	"Skin Deep" 7"
7.	"Hot Club" (Instrumental)	"No Mercy" 12"

Side four
No.	Title	Origin	Length
8.	"In One Door"	"No Mercy" 7"
9.	"Head on the Line"	"No Mercy" EP
10.	"Achilles Heel"	"Let Me Down Easy" 7"
11.	"North Winds" (acoustic version) (live at Stadsschouwburg Cultuurcentrum, Brugge, 23 November 2007)	Themeninblackinbrugge, 2008
12.	"Skin Deep" (live at Hammersmith Apollo, London, 19 March 2010)	Live at the Apollo 2010, 2010
13.	"Ice Queen" (live at Brighton Dome, Brighton, 26 March 2019)	Previously unreleased
14.	"Uptown" (live at Bristol Academy, Bristol, 26 March 2019)	Previously unreleased

== Personnel ==
Credits adapted from the album liner notes, except where noted.

The Stranglers

- Hugh Cornwell – vocals, guitar
- Jean-Jacques Burnel – bass, vocals (lead vocals on "North Winds")
- Dave Greenfield – keyboards
- Jet Black – percussion

Additional personnel

- Tim Whitehead – saxophone on "Ice Queen", "Punch and Judy" and "Mad Hatter"
- Paul Spong – trumpet on "Ice Queen", "Punch and Judy" and "Mad Hatter"
- Paul Nieman – trombone on "Ice Queen", "Punch and Judy" and "Mad Hatter"
- George Chandler – backing vocals on "Let Me Down Easy", "No Mercy" and "Mad Hatter"
- Jimmy Chambers – backing vocals on "Let Me Down Easy", "No Mercy" and "Mad Hatter"
- Tony Jackson – backing vocals on "Let Me Down Easy", "No Mercy" and "Mad Hatter"
- Candide – female voice on "Spain" (taken from a speech by Carmen Franco)

Technical

- Laurie Latham – producer, engineer
- The Stranglers – co-producer on "Skin Deep", "North Winds", "Punch and Judy" and "Souls"
- Christian "Djoum" Ramon – additional engineering
- Erwin Autrique – additional engineering
- Simon Cantwell – art direction
- Jean Luke Epstein – design
- John King – artwork (ear sculpture)
- John Kisch – front cover photography
- Brian Griffin – back cover photography
- Connie Moore – logo illustration

Bonus tracks

- Jean-Jacques Burnel – lead vocals on "Here and There", "Vladimir and the Beast (part 3)" and "Vladimir Goes to Havana"
- Dagmar Kreuze – backing vocals on "Here and There"
- Alex Gifford – saxophone, backing vocals on 1985 and 1987 live recordings
- Chris Lawrence – trombone, backing vocals on 1985 and 1987 live recordings
- Jason Votier – trumpet, backing vocals on 1985 and 1987 live recordings
- Neil Sparkes – percussion, backing vocals on 2007 live recording
- Jim Macaulay – drums on 2019 live recordings
- Laurie Latham – producer on "Here and There" and "In One Door"
- The Stranglers – producer on "Here and There", "In One Door", "Vladimir and the Beast (part 3)", "Head on the Line", "Hot Club", "Achilles Heel", "Place de Victoires" and "Spain" (live)
- Ted Hayton – producer on "Spain" (live)
- Louie Nicastro – producer on "North Winds" (live)

== Charts ==
=== Weekly charts ===
Chart (1984–1985)	Peak position
Dutch Albums (Album Top 100)	31
German Albums (Offizielle Top 100)	17
New Zealand Albums (RMNZ)	13
Swedish Albums (Sverigetopplistan)	37
UK Albums (OCC)	14

=== Year-end charts ===
Chart (1985)	Position
German Albums (Offizielle Top 100)	75
New Zealand Albums (RMNZ)	44
