= 5 Minutes (The Stranglers song) =

Single by The Stranglers
- B-side: "Rok it to the Moon"
- Released: 27 January 1978 (UK)
- Genre: Punk rock; new wave
- Length: 3:17
- Label: United Artists
- Songwriters: Hugh Cornwell; Jean-Jacques Burnel; Dave Greenfield; Jet Black
- Producer: Martin Rushent

The Stranglers singles chronology
"Sometimes" (1977)	"5 Minutes" (1978)	"Nice 'n' Sleazy" (1978)

"5 Minutes" is a song by English rock band the Stranglers, released in 1978 as a single. Sung by bassist Jean-Jacques Burnel, it gives an account of a rape that occurred at a shared flat in London he lived in during 1977. The lyrics, sung in both English and French, convey Burnel's frustrations over finding the five men who committed the attack.

The song was recorded in between No More Heroes and Black and White. It reached number 11 in the UK Singles Chart.

== Background ==
In 1977, Burnel was living in a London flat with Wilko Johnson, then the guitarist of the band Dr. Feelgood, as well as a female employee of the Sex Pistols. One night, while Burnel was playing a concert with The Stranglers, his flatmate was raped, an event so traumatising that Burnel left the flat soon after.

The title of the song refers to Burnel's apartment being located in a dangerous area of London just five minutes away from The Bishops Avenue, one of the wealthiest streets in the world, and the juxtaposition of the two communities.

The lyric "some say that I should hate them all," according to Burnel, refers to how people used the fact that the five rapists were black men as an excuse for racism.

"The main point, in the middle eight, was 'some say that I should hate them all' about all black people which was absolutely ridiculous and obscene. I just wanted to find those guys, I didn't use it as an excuse for hating all black people. How would you?"

— Jean-Jacques Burnel

== Charts ==
Chart (1978)	Peak position
UK Singles (OCC)	11
