= Steve Churchyard =

English audio engineer and record producer

Steve Churchyard is an English audio engineer and record producer who came to prominence working with the Pretenders.

== Career ==
Churchyard grew up in Surbiton He attended senior school at Surbiton Grammar school in Thames ditton whilst he and his parents resided at The Old Bull in East Sheen, a popular heavy disco venue and pub - now demolished. In 1974 he began his career as an assistant at the Orange Music recording studio in the basement of a guitar shop near London's Tin Pan Alley, where he worked for three years, moving up from tape-op, to engineer, to chief tech, to studio manager. In 1977 he was offered a position as an assistant at Sir George Martin’s AIR Studios. His first job at the studio was assisting Geoff Emerick on Paul McCartney and Wings' 1978 album London Town.

In 1982 Churchyard began working with producer Chris Thomas, which led to his working on the Pretenders' 1984 album Learning to Crawl and INXS' 1985 album Listen Like Thieves. Churchyard relocated to Los Angeles in the 1990s, working on projects by Sophie B. Hawkins, Duran Duran, Celine Dion, and Ricky Martin.

He has also worked on recordings by the Sex Pistols, Rod Stewart, Cliff Richard, Madness, Big Country, Siouxsie and the Banshees, Dalis Car, Warren Zevon, Meat Loaf, The Stranglers, Scorpions, Billy Joel, Joni Mitchell, Sinéad O'Connor, Counting Crows, Keith Urban, Tim McGraw, Faith Hill, LeAnn Rimes, the Eagles, Herbie Hancock, Dishwalla, Beck, Ben Folds, Sheryl Crow, Shakira, George Michael, Hanson, Avril Lavigne, Kelly Clarkson, The Darkness, and Adele.

== Awards and nominations ==
Churchyard has been nominated for 15 Grammy awards. In 2008 he won a Latin Grammy for Juanes' album La Vida... Es Un Ratico. In 2010, he won a Latin Grammy for the album Paraíso Express by Alejandro Sanz.

In 2011, Churchyard received a Grammy nomination for Katy Perry's album Teenage Dream and again in 2012 for Jason Mraz's album Love Is a Four Letter Word.
