= Duchess (The Stranglers song) =

Single by the Stranglers

from the album The Raven
- B-side: "Fools Rush Out"
- Released: 10 August 1979
- Genre: New wave; power pop
- Length: 2:30
- Label: United Artists
- Songwriter: The Stranglers
- Producers: Alan Winstanley, The Stranglers

The Stranglers singles chronology
"Walk On By" (1978)	"Duchess" (1979)	"Nuclear Device (The Wizard of Aus)" (1979)

"Duchess" is a single by the Stranglers from the album The Raven. The ninth track on the album, it peaked at number 14 in the UK Singles Chart. The supporting video for the song was banned by the BBC, as they deemed it blasphemous for its content, which featured the band dressed up as choirboys.

== Reception ==
Smash Hits said, "Hugh Cornwell actually sings. Yeah, a bit shaky maybe, but it's proper singing. And the song's quite nice. But it's also repetitive and lacks any real substance." Fred Thomas of AllMusic noted the song's "proto-new wave synth pop" fueled The Raven's success.

== Cover versions ==
- The song was covered by My Life Story as part of EMI's centenary celebrations in 1997 and reached the UK Top 40.
