= Dave Greenfield =

English rock keyboardist (1949–2020)

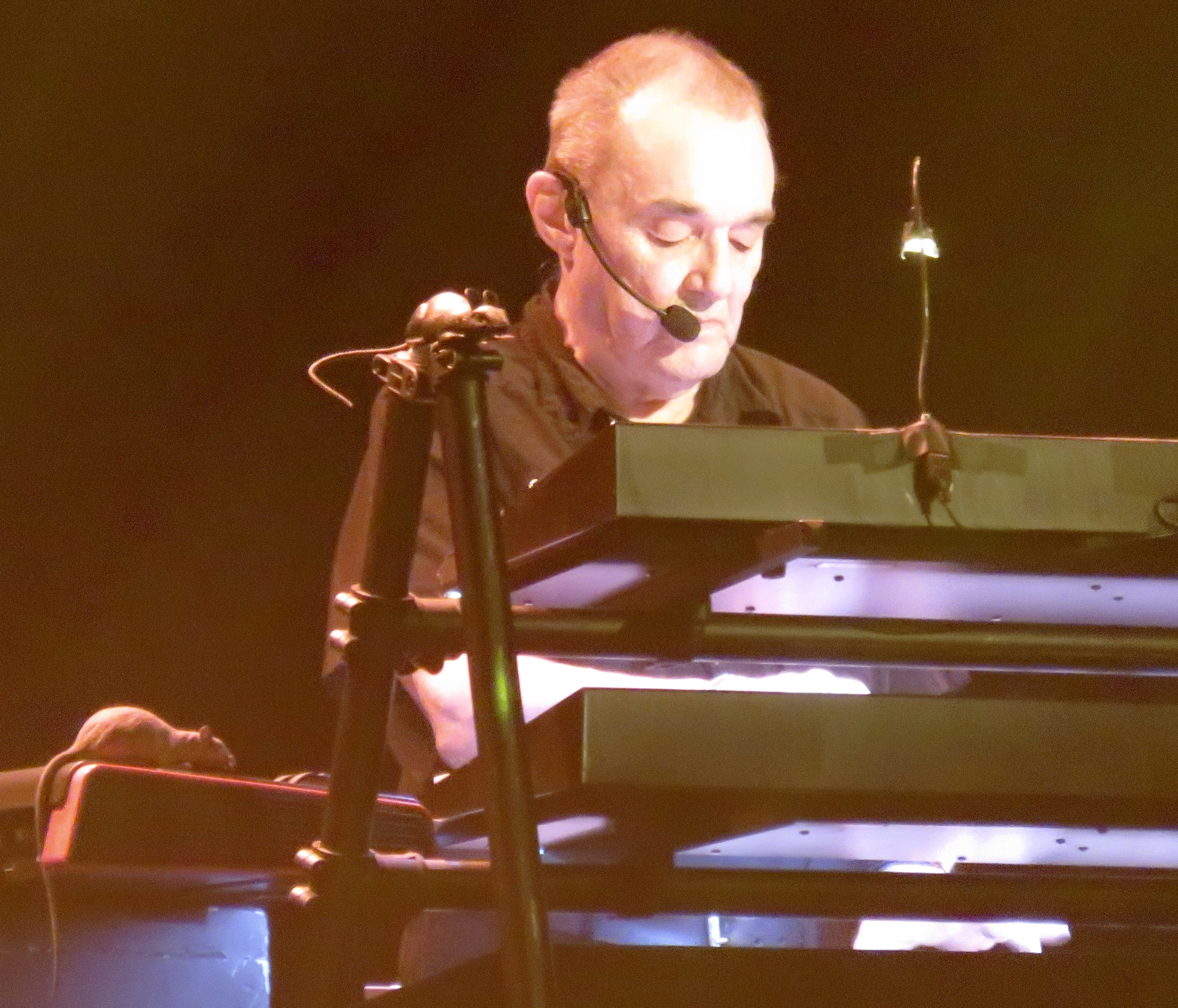
- Greenfield with the Stranglers at Cambridge Corn Exchange, 2018

Background information
- Born: David Paul Greenfield; 29 March 1949; Brighton, Sussex, England
- Died: 3 May 2020 (aged 71) England
- Genres: Progressive rock (early), punk rock, new wave, post-punk
- Occupation: Musician
- Instruments: Keyboards, synthesizer, vocals
- Years active: Late 1960s–2020

David Paul Greenfield (29 March 1949 – 3 May 2020) was an English keyboardist, singer and songwriter who was a member of rock band the Stranglers. He joined the band in 1975, within a year of its formation, and played with them for 45 years until his death.

== Early life and education ==
Greenfield was born on 29 March 1949 in the south coast seaside resort of Brighton, Sussex, England. He learnt guitar from an older schoolmate and, after leaving school, played for a year in bands at American bases in Germany.

== Career ==
Greenfield tried to develop a music career in Germany, and played in bands in Britain as well as Germany while also working in his father's printing business and as a piano tuner. In Britain, his bands included the Initials, the Blue Maxi (on the single "Here Comes Summer", released by Major Minor Records in 1970), and progressive rock bands Rusty Butler and Credo.

He joined the Stranglers after answering an advert by the band in Melody Maker in July 1975, replacing Hans Wärmling, playing his first gig with them on 24 August 1975. He stayed in the group until his death in 2020.

In 1981, Greenfield produced the single "Back to France" by the band Boys in Darkness. Greenfield and Jean-Jacques Burnel released an album together in 1983, Fire & Water (Ecoutez Vos Murs), which was used as the soundtrack for the film Ecoutez vos murs, directed by Vincent Coudanne.

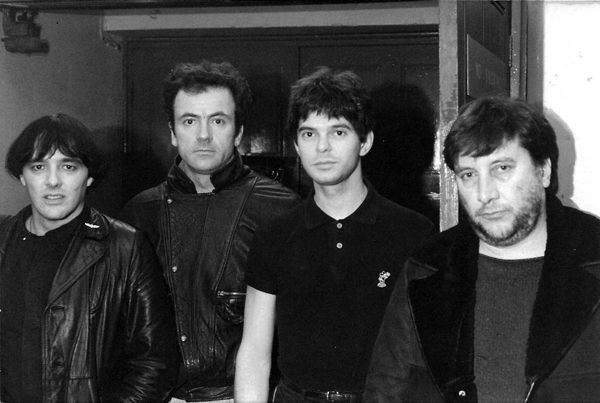
Dave Greenfield (far left) with the Stranglers in 1985

He was a musical perfectionist and could be awkward in social situations; observations consistent with his diagnosis, never made public during his lifetime, of what Burnel described as a "very high-functioning autistic". For many years he was a member of Grantanbrycg, the Cambridgeshire branch of the UK re-enactment group Regia Anglorum.

=== Musical style and equipment ===
Greenfield's sound and style of playing, particularly on the Stranglers' debut album Rattus Norvegicus, has been compared to that of Ray Manzarek of the Doors. The comparison was even made at the Stranglers' inception by Jean-Jacques Burnel, who said Greenfield had not heard of the Doors at the time. Greenfield admitted that he knew a few Doors tracks, those being "Light My Fire" and "Riders on the Storm". He cited the works of Rick Wakeman of Yes and Jon Lord of Deep Purple as his early influences. He was also noted for his trademark style of playing rapid arpeggios. His distinctive sound on the early Stranglers recordings involved the use of Hohner Cembalet (model N), (Note: Restoration of Greenfield's Hohner Cembalet featured in a February 2026 episode of The Repair Shop television series.) Hammond L-100 electric organ, a Minimoog synthesizer, and later an Oberheim OB-Xa.

Greenfield wrote a piece of waltz-time harpsichord music during recording for The Meninblack, which was discarded by other members of the Stranglers, but was later adapted into their biggest hit "Golden Brown", with lyrics from Hugh Cornwell and music from Greenfield and Jet Black, although the band themselves did not initially see this as a potential single. In addition to its chart success, the song also won an Ivor Novello award.

=== Vocal performances ===
On the albums The Raven, The Gospel According to the Meninblack and Aural Sculpture, Greenfield used a Korg VC-10 vocoder. Notable instances of this include in "Genetix" when it accompanies his own vocal and during the "Gene Regulation" section underneath Hugh Cornwell's monologue, and on "Baroque Bordello" towards the end of the song.

He also frequently contributed harmony backing vocals to the band's songs, and sang the lead vocals on a few of their early tracks, as mentioned in Hugh Cornwell's book The Stranglers, Song by Song. These tracks are:

- "Dead Ringer" and "Peasant in the Big Shitty" from the album No More Heroes
- "Do You Wanna?" from Black and White
- "Genetix" from The Raven
- "Four Horsemen" from The Gospel According to the Meninblack
- "God Is Good" from Coup de Grace

== Death ==
Greenfield died on 3 May 2020, aged 71. He had been diagnosed with COVID-19 infection during the COVID-19 pandemic in England on 26 April 2020, a week before his death, during an extended hospital stay for heart-related problems. Upon news of his death, several current and former members of the Stranglers eulogised him on social media. Hugh Cornwell tweeted, "He was the difference between the Stranglers and every other punk band. His musical skill and gentle nature gave an interesting twist to the band. He should be remembered as the man who gave the world the music of 'Golden Brown.'" Other artists also expressed their appreciation. Greenfield's last concert with the band was on 15 February 2020 at the Auckland Town Hall in Auckland, New Zealand.

== Discography ==
- Fire & Water (Ecoutez Vos Murs) (1983) – with Jean-Jacques Burnel
