= Lindisfarne discography =

Band discography

This is a list of the records issued by the UK folk rock band Lindisfarne.

== Albums ==
Year	Title	Chart positions			Certifications
Year	Title	UK	AUS	CAN	Certifications
1970	Nicely Out of Tune	8	44	—	
1971	Fog on the Tyne	1	45	53	
1972	Dingly Dell	5	38	—	
1973	Roll On Ruby	—	—	—	
1974	Happy Daze	—	—	—	
1978	Back and Fourth	22	85	—	BPI: Silver
1979	The News	—	—	—	
1982	Sleepless Nights	59	—	—	
1986	Dance Your Life Away	—	—	—	
1987	C'mon Everybody	—	—	—	
1989	Amigos	—	—	—	
1993	Elvis Lives on the Moon	—	—	—	
1997	Blues from the Bothy (EP)	—	—	—	
1999	Here Comes the Neighbourhood	—	—	—	
2002	Promenade	—	—	—	
"—" denotes releases that did not chart.

== Live albums ==
Year	Title	Chart positions	Notes
Year	Title	UK	Notes
1973	Lindisfarne Live	25	Recorded at Newcastle City Hall.
1978	Magic in the Air	71	Recorded at Newcastle City Hall at the 1976 Christmas reunion concerts.
1983	Lindisfarntastic	—	Originally given away free at concerts.
1984	Lindisfarntastic 2	—	Originally sold for £1.99 at concerts.
1984	Caught in the Act	—	Originally released in two parts as Lindisfarntastic I and Lindisfarntastic II.
1993	Live	—	Recorded in Nottingham in 1990. Rare appearance of Steve Cunningham on bass.
1995	Another Fine Mess	—	Recorded at Newcastle City Hall on 2 July 1995 commemorating 25 years since Lindisfarne first performed there.
1997	Untapped & Acoustic	—	Recorded at Marden High School 12 December 1996. Rereleased with different sleeve and 4 track "Blues from the Bothy" EP in 2000.
1997	The Cropredy Concert	—	Recorded at Fairport Convention's Cropredy Festival.
1997	City Songs	—	BBC Recordings 1971–72.
1997	We Can Swing Together	—	BBC in Concert Recordings: 18 July and 7 December 1971.
1997	Dealer's Choice	—	BBC Recordings: 14 December 1973 and 5 August 1974.
1999	Live at the Cambridge Folk Festival	—	Recorded in 1982 and 1986.
2002	Acoustic	—	Recorded live at the Magnesia Bank, North Shields 6 July 2002.
2004	Acoustic 2	—	Recorded at Riverdale, Bellingham, Northumberland in July 2003.
2004	The River Sessions	—	Disc 1 is Live at Glasgow Apollo (7 December 1982). Disc 2 is Alan Hull solo recordings for Radio Clyde from 1976 and 1978.
2004	Time Gentlemen Please	—	Recorded 1 November 2003. Billed as "the Final Concert" although Lindisfarne have subsequently reformed.
2013	Live	—	
2014	Newcastle City Hall Live	—	Credited to Ray Jackson's Lindisfarne. Line up is Jackson, Harcourt, Hull-Denholm, Daggett, Thomson and Paul Thompson on drums.
2015	Access All Areas	—	CD and DVD: 1990 performance in Central TV's Nottingham studios.
"—" denotes releases that did not chart.

== Compilations ==
- Finest Hour (1975) - No. 55 in October 1975.
- Lady Eleanor (1977) - Budget compilation on Pickwick Records.
- Repeat Performance (1981)
- The Best of Lindisfarne (1989) - 16 track compilation from Lindisfarne Mk I.
- Buried Treasures Vol. I (1992) - Compilation of previously unreleased material.
- Buried Treasures Vol. II (1992) - Included some previously unreleased material.
- Lindisfarne On Tap (1994) - Castle Communications: 18 track compilation 1970–1993.
- The Other Side Of (1996) - Mooncrest: 6 "classic" songs and 8 covers from the "C'Mon Everybody" album
- Lindisfarne (1997) - Rialto Archive Series: 6 "classic" songs and 12 covers from the "C'Mon Everybody" album
- Lady Eleanor (1997) - Recall: 2CD (36 tracks) compilation spanning 1978–1994.
- Run for Home (1997) - Music Club: 19 tracks from the 1978–1993 period.
- Anthology: Road to Kingdom Come (2000) - Castle Music: 2CD (35 tracks) from the 1978–1993 period.
- Magic in the Air/Caught in the Act (2000) - Castle Music: 2CD compilation of "Magic in the Air" and the 2 Lindisfarntastic Albums.
- Run For Home (2000) Castle Pie: 16 track compilation 1978–1993.
- BT3 (2000) Included some previously unreleased material.
- Back on the Tyne (2002) - Eagle Records: 2CD (23 track) compilation.
- The Very Best of Lindisfarne (2003) - 20 tracks from the original 3 albums and mini biography by Ray Laidlaw. Features 2 previously unreleased tracks ("Sleeping" and "Love in a Cage")
- The Best of Lindisfarne (2005) - Virgin Charisma: 19 tracks from studio albums up to "Promenade".
- Meet me on the Corner: The Collection (2006)
- The Charisma Years 1970–1973 (4 CD Box set) - featuring their five Charisma albums Nicely out of tune, Fog on the Tyne, Dingly Dell, Lindisfarne Live and Roll On Ruby; with several bonus tracks (singles A and B sides, etc.)
- Brand New Day — The Mercury years 1978–1979 (3 CD Box set) - featuring their three Mercury albums Magic in the Air (Live), Run for Home and The News; with several bonus tracks (most of them previously unreleased)

== Singles ==
Year	Title	Chart positions					Certifications
Year	Title	UK	US	AUS	CAN	CAN AC	Certifications
1970	"Clear White Light"	—	—	—	—	—	
1971	"Lady Eleanor"	3	82	45	68	—	
1971	"Meet Me on the Corner"	5	—	57	—	—	
1972	"All Fall Down"	34	—	—	—	—	
1972	"Court in the Act"	—	—	—	—	—	
1974	"Fog on the Tyne"	—	—	—	—	—	
1974	"Taking Care of Business"	—	—	—	—	—	
1975	"Tonight"	—	—	—	—	—	
1978	"Run For Home"	10	33	78	54	20	BPI: Silver
1978	"Juke Box Gypsy"	56	—	—	—	—	
1978	"Brand New Day"	—	—	—	—	—	
1979	"Warm Feeling"	—	—	—	—	—	
1979	"Easy and Free"	—	—	—	—	—	
1979	"Call of the Wild"	—	—	—	—	—	
1980	"Friday Girl"	—	—	—	—	—	
1980	"Red Square Dance"	—	—	—	—	—	
1981	"I Must Stop Going to Parties"	—	—	—	—	—	
1982	"Sunderland Boys"	—	—	—	—	—	
1982	"Nights"	—	—	—	—	—	
1983	"Same Way Down"	—	—	—	—	—	
1986	"Shine On"	—	—	—	—	—	
1987	"One Hundred Miles to Liverpool"	—	—	—	—	—	
1988	"Save Our Ales"	—	—	—	—	—	
1990	"Fog on the Tyne (Revisited)" (with Paul Gascoigne)	2	—	—	—	—	
1993	"Day of the Jackal"	—	—	—	—	—	
1994	"We Can Make It"	—	—	—	—	—	
"—" denotes releases that did not chart or were not released in that territory.
