= Winter Song (Lindisfarne song) =

Song by Lindisfarne

from the album Nicely Out of Tune
- Released: November 1970
- Genre: Folk rock
- Length: 5:09
- Label: (United Kingdom) Charisma (United States) Elektra
- Songwriter: Alan Hull
- Producer: John Anthony

"Winter Song" is a song performed by English band Lindisfarne. It was released on their debut album Nicely Out of Tune in November 1970. Elvis Costello singled out "Winter Song" as one of the greatest songs ever.

== Personnel ==
Lindisfarne

- Alan Hull - vocals, acoustic guitar, 12-string guitar, organ, piano, electric piano
- Ray Jackson - vocals, mandolin, harmonica, flatulette (blown raspberry)
- Rod Clements - electric bass, organ, piano, violin, guitars, vocals
- Simon Cowe - lead, acoustic and 12-string guitars, mandolin, banjo, vocals
- Ray Laidlaw - drums

== Sam Fender version ==
"Winter Song"

Single by Sam Fender
- Released: 24 November 2020
- Length: 4:14
- Label: Polydor
- Songwriter: Alan Hull
- Producer: Bramwell Bronte

Sam Fender singles chronology
"Hold Out" (2020)	"Winter Song" (2020)	"Seventeen Going Under" (2021)

English musician Sam Fender recorded a version of the song as a fundraiser for The Big Issue. It was released as a digital download in November 2020 by Polydor Records.

=== Background ===
"I wanted to do a Christmas song, and wanted it to be close to my home and my heart. For me, the words are more relevant this year than ever. Christmas won't be the same for a lot of people this year, and that's why I picked Winter Song. Alan Hull truly was one of the most fantastic and underrated writers of his time. Geordie legend. I hope I've done it justice, I'm really proud of it."

— Sam Fender, NME

"I wanted to do a Christmas song, but I didn't want to do something that was crass and cr*p. Winter Song is one of my favourite Christmas tunes and Alan Hull is one of my heroes [...] so I just wanted to do something that was close to home and close to my heart and that's why I picked it. If you listen to the song and the original track the lyrics are actually really poignant and relevant for the time. It's basically a Christmas message of trying to be more empathetic about people who are worse off than you."

— Sam Fender, Radio X

=== Lyric video ===
A lyric video to accompany the release of "Winter Song" was also released. Talking about the video, Fender said, "So we got together with People Of The Streets [...] and I think it's sort of the first time you get to see the perspective of homeless people. You hear stats and statistics and you see the figures and it's horrible, but you don't actually see the human side of it. When you watch the video it's stunning and I was choking up the first time that I watched it. It's human and it makes it a lot more personal and a lot more close to home."

=== Personnel ===
Credits adapted from Tidal.

- Bramwell Bronte – Producer, engineer, mixer, studio personnel
- Alan Hull – Composer, lyricist
- India Bourne – Associated Performer, cello
- Sam Fender – Associated Performer, piano, vocals
- Robin Schmidt – Mastering Engineer, studio personnel

=== Charts ===
Chart (2020)	Peak position
Belgium (Ultratip Bubbling Under Flanders)	23

=== Release history ===
Region	Date	Format	Label
United Kingdom	24 November 2020	Digital download; streaming	Polydor
