= Repeat Performance (album) =

Compilation album series

Repeat Performance are a series of budget compilation albums that were issued by Charisma Records in 1980. The first of the series was a various artists compilation, subsequent albums showcased an artist on the label. BG004, claimed to be a compilation of Genesis, was unissued.

== Various artists ==
Repeat Performance

Compilation album by Various Artists
- Released: 5 September 1980
- Genre: Hard rock
- Label: Charisma Records - BG001

Side 1

1. Van der Graaf Generator - "Theme One"
2. Lindisfarne - "Lady Eleanor"
3. Rare Bird - "Sympathy"
4. Clifford T. Ward - "Gaye"
5. String Driven Thing - "It's a Game"
6. Capability Brown - "Liar"
7. The Nice - "America"

Side 2

1. Genesis - "I Know What I Like (In Your Wardrobe)"
2. Gary Shearston - "I Get a Kick Out of You"
3. Chris White - "Spanish Wine"
4. Peter Gabriel - "Solsbury Hill"
5. Link Wray - "It's All Over Now"
6. Steve Hackett - "Every Day"
7. Bill Lovelady - "Reggae for It Now"

== Hawkwind ==
Repeat Performance

Compilation album by Hawkwind
- Released: 5 September 1980
- Recorded: 1976 – 1979
- Genre: Hard rock
- Label: Charisma Records - BG002

Hawkwind chronology
Masters of the Universe (1977)	Repeat Performance (1980)	Angels of Death (Hawkwind album) (1986)

Professional ratings
Review scores
Source	Rating
The Encyclopedia of Popular Music	3/5 stars

Repeat Performance is the third compilation album of the English space rock group Hawkwind, released in 1980 covering their contract period with Charisma Records from 1976 through to 1979. It succeeds the two previous United Artists Records compilation albums Roadhawks and Masters of the Universe which covered the periods 1970 to 1975.

The album draws from Astounding Sounds, Amazing Music (1976), Quark, Strangeness and Charm (1977), 25 Years On (1978) and PXR5 (1979). Also included is the single only release "Back on the Streets", subsequently included on the CD remaster of Astounding Sounds, Amazing Music, and the single edits of "25 Years" and "Psi Power".

Side 1

1. "Kerb Crawler" (Robert Calvert, Dave Brock) 3:45 – from Astounding Sounds, Amazing Music
2. "Back on the Streets" (Calvert, Paul Rudolph) 2:58 – single A-side
3. "Quark, Strangeness and Charm" (Calvert, Brock) 3:06 – from Quark, Strangeness and Charm
4. "Spirit of the Age" (Calvert, Brock) 8:02 – from Quark, Strangeness and Charm
5. "Steppenwolf" (Calvert, Brock) 9:46 – from Astounding Sounds, Amazing Music

Side 2

1. "25 Years" (Brock) 3:29 – from 25 Years On
2. "Psi Power" (Calvert, Brock) 4:23 – from 25 Years On
3. "The Only Ones" (Calvert, Brock) 4:23 – from 25 Years On
4. "High Rise" (Calvert, Simon House) 4:40 – from PXR5
5. "Uncle Sam's on Mars" (Calvert, Brock, House, Simon King) 5:42 – from PXR5

== Van der Graaf Generator ==
Repeat Performance

Compilation album by Van der Graaf Generator
- Released: 5 September 1980
- Recorded: 1969 – 1972
- Genre: Progressive rock
- Label: Charisma Records - BG003

Van der Graaf Generator chronology
68–71 (1972)	Repeat Performance (1980)	Time Vaults (1982)

Repeat Performance is the second compilation album of the English progressive rock group Van der Graaf Generator, released in 1980, covering their first incarnation under contract with Charisma Records from 1969 through to 1972.

It draws from the albums The Aerosol Grey Machine (1969), The Least We Can Do Is Wave to Each Other (1970) and H to He, Who Am the Only One (1970) and Pawn Hearts (1971). Also included are the single only B-sides "Boat of Millions of Years" and "W", and a single version of "Refugees". This single version was a different recording than that on The Least We Can Do Is Wave to Each Other, and was released on a 7" and a 10" single in 2 different mixes. The one featured here is the rare 10" mix, which was released on CD so far only on the compilation I Prophesy Disaster (1993).

All tracks written by Peter Hammill

Side 1

1. "Afterwards" – from The Aerosol Grey Machine
2. "Refugees" – 10" single version
3. "Boat of Millions of Years" – b-side to "Refugees" single (1970)
4. "W" – b-side to "Theme One" single (1972)
5. "White Hammer" – from The Least We Can Do Is Wave to Each Other

Side 2

1. "Necromancer" – from The Aerosol Grey Machine
2. "The Emperor In His War Room" – from H to He, Who Am the Only One
  - "The Emperor"
  - "The Room"
3. "Man-Erg" – from Pawn Hearts

The cassette issue in the UK contains an otherwise unreleased bonus track titled

4. "The Clot Thickens" which is a section of "A Plague of Lighthouse Keepers" on Pawn Hearts, but goes on here a few seconds longer.

== Lindisfarne ==
Repeat Performance

Compilation album by Lindisfarne
- Released: May 1981
- Recorded: 1970 – 1973
- Genre: Hard rock
- Label: Charisma Records - BG005

Lindisfarne chronology
Finest Hour (1975)	Repeat Performance (1981)	The Best Of Lindisfarne (1986)

Repeat Performance is the second compilation album of the English folk rock group Lindisfarne, released in 1981 covering their contract period with Charisma Records from 1970 through to 1973.

It draws from the albums Nicely Out of Tune (1970), Fog on the Tyne (1971), Dingly Dell (1972) and Roll On, Ruby (1973), as well as non-album single B-sides

Side 1

1. "Clear White Light Part Two" (Alan Hull) – Nicely Out of Tune
2. "Knackers Yard Blues" (Rod Clements) – B-side of "Clear White Light Part Two"
3. "Lady Eleanor" (Hull) – Nicely Out of Tune
4. "Nothing but the marvellous is beautiful" (Hull) – B-side to "Lady Eleanor"
5. "Meet me on the corner" (Clements) – Fog on the Tyne
6. "Scotch Mist" (trad. arr. Lindisfarne) – B-side of "Meet Me on the Corner"
7. "No time to lose" (Hull) 1973 – B-side of "Meet Me on the Corner"

Side 2

8. "All fall down" (Hull) – Dingly Dell
9. "We can swing together" [Live] (Hull) – Nicely Out of Tune
10. "Court in the act" (Hull) – Dingly Dell
11. "Don't ask me" (Clements) – Dingly Dell
12. "Taking care of business" (Hull) – Roll On, Ruby
13. "North Country Boy" (Tom Duffy) – Roll On, Ruby
14. "Fog on the Tyne" (Hull) – Fog on the Tyne
15. "Mandolin King" (Hull) – Dingly Dell
