= Fog on the Tyne (song) =

1971 song by Lindisfarne

Single by Lindisfarne

from the album Fog on the Tyne
- B-side: "Mandolin King"
- Released: 1974
- Length: 3:23
- Label: Charisma
- Songwriter: Alan Hull
- Producer: Bob Johnston

Lindisfarne singles chronology
"Court in the Act" (1972)	"Fog on the Tyne" (1974)	"Taking Care of Business" (1974)

"Fog on the Tyne" is a song by English folk rock band Lindisfarne from their second studio album , Fog on the Tyne (1971). It was written by their guitarist and keyboardist Alan Hull. Hull sings the first and fourth verse while vocalist Ray Jackson sings the second verse and guitarist Simon Cowe sings the third verse. The song was released as a single in 1974 but did not chart anywhere.

== "Fog on the Tyne (Revisited)" ==
"Fog on the Tyne (Revisited)"

Single by Gazza and Lindisfarne
- B-side: "Fog on the Tyne (Revisited)" (instrumental)
- Released: 29 October 1990
- Label: Best
- Songwriters: Alan Hull, Marty Craggs
- Producers: Steven Daggett, Steve Cunningham

Lindisfarne singles chronology
"Save Our Ales" (1988)	"Fog on the Tyne (Revisited)" (1990)	"Day of the Jackal" (1993)

In 1990, the song was remixed and recorded featuring rapping from footballer Paul Gascoigne. Titled "Fog on the Tyne (Revisited)", the song was released on 29 October 1990 and credited to "Gazza and Lindisfarne". The new lyrics rapped by Gascoigne were written by saxophonist Marty Craggs, and the record was produced by newer band members Steven Daggett and Steve Cunningham.

The production of "Fog on the Tyne (revisited)" is infamous for leading to the breaking of the original lineup, as Ray Jackson left the band before the recording, due to his distaste of using this opportunity as a way for Lindisfarne to have a comeback, with him admitting in a 2013 interview: "The band’s recording career was beginning to wane and the idea was presented to me as a way of finding our way back into the charts. I felt uncomfortable right from the start of this process and considered it ill judged. In my opinion it was totally at odds with our solid reputation, built over the previous two decades of performing and writing. I felt we were selling out; the rest of the band disagreed."

"Fog on the Tyne (Revisited)" peaked at number two in the United Kingdom and number six in both Ireland and Norway. This marked the first time the band had appeared on the UK Singles Chart since "Juke Box Gypsy" in 1978 and was their first UK top-10 hit since "Run For Home" in 1978. It is also their highest-charting single in UK, beating "Lady Eleanor", which peaked at number three in 1971.

=== Charts ===
Chart (1990)	Peak position
Europe (Eurochart Hot 100)	7
Ireland (IRMA)	6
Norway (VG-lista)	6
UK Singles (Official Charts)	2
