= Pipedream (Alan Hull album) =

Studio album by Alan Hull
- Released: 1973
- Genres: Folk rock, folk
- Length: 40:21
- Labels: (United Kingdom) Charisma (United States) Elektra
- Producers: Mickey Sweeney, Alan Hull

Alan Hull chronology
Pipedream (1973)	Squire (1974)

Pipedream is the first solo album from Lindisfarne singer Alan Hull. The album reached No. 29 in the UK, while also charting in Australia.

== Cover artwork ==
The cover artwork is based on a painting The Philosopher's Pipe by René Magritte.

== Music ==
"Blue Murder" has been compared to Neil Young's 1969 song "Down by the River".

Hull considered "Drug Song" to be one of his favourite songs, saying, "It's all a bit in the past now, but looking back to the time when I did it, I got most buzz from it – I think it's one of my better songs – has a real message and it really happened".

== Track listing ==
All songs written by Alan Hull.

1. "Breakfast" - 3:29
2. "Justanothersadsong" - 2:52
3. "Money Game" - 2:41
4. "STD 0632" - 3:06
5. "United States of Mind" - 3:04
6. "Country Gentleman's Wife" - 3:36
7. "Numbers (Travelling Band)" - 3:48
8. "For The Bairns" - 2:25
9. "Drug Song" - 3:07
10. "Song for a Windmill" 2:44
11. "Blue Murder" - 5:07
12. "I Hate To See You Cry" 3:22

== Charts ==
Chart (1973)	Peak position
UK Albums Chart (Official Charts Company)	29
Australian (Kent Music Report)	51

== Personnel ==
- Alan Hull - vocals, guitar, piano, harmonium, "Guinness, wine, tequila, Pernod, Coca-Cola"
- John Turnbull - guitar, "orange juice, health foods"
- Colin Gibson - bass, "mental indecision, snuff and herbal tobacco"
- Ken Craddock - piano, organ, harmonium, electric piano, guitar, "Guinness, wine, tequila, Pernod, Coca-cola and anything else around at the time"
- Ray Laidlaw - drums, "common sense"
- Ray Jackson - harp, mandolin, vocals, "Rude noises"
- Dave Brooks - saxophone on "For The Bairns"

Technical

- Mickey Sweeney - producer, "high level energy"
- Roy T. Baker - engineer, mixing, "woofy woofy"
- Ken Scott, Mike Stone - engineer
- Ian Vincenti - sleeve design
- René Magritte - "La Lampe Philosophique" front cover
