= Run For Home =

1978 song by Lindisfarne

Single by Lindisfarne

from the album Back and Fourth
- B-side: "Stick Together"
- Released: 1978
- Length: 4:21
- Label: Mercury Records
- Songwriter: Alan Hull
- Producer: Gus Dudgeon

Lindisfarne singles chronology
"Tonight" (1975)	"Run For Home" (1978)	"Juke Box Gypsy" (1978)

"Run for Home" is a 1978 song by Lindisfarne, originally recorded as a track for their sixth studio album, Back and Fourth, and released as a single a few weeks before the album. The song was written by the bands keyboardist and co-lead vocalist Alan Hull, who also sang lead vocals on the track.

== Reception ==
The song peaked at number ten in the United Kingdom, making it their fourth single to chart in the UK and their third top ten. The song also peaked at number twenty on the Canadian Adult Contemporary charts and at number fifty-four on the official Canada singles charts. It also peaked at number thirty-three in America (their first US top 40), and number seventy-eight in Australia. Bruce Eder of AllMusic called the song "Alan Hull's best song to date".

The song was certified silver by the British Phonographic Industry (BPI) in July 1978, their only single to date to receive a Music certification.

== Charts ==
Chart (1971–1972)	Peak position
UK (Official Charts Company)	10
Australia (Kent Music Report)	58
Canada (RPM)	54
Canada (Adult Contemporary)	12
US Billboard Hot 100	33

== Personnel ==
- Alan Hull – lead vocals, piano
- Ray Jackson – tambourine, backing vocals
- Simon Cowe – guitar, backing vocals
- Rod Clements – bass, backing vocals
- Ray Laidlaw – drums, backing vocals
- Bruce Baxter – string arrangement
- unknown – cor anglais
