= Squire (album) =

1975 album by Alan Hull

Studio album by Alan Hull
- Released: 1975
- Recorded: 1973–75
- Genre: Folk rock, folk
- Length: 38:25
- Label: Warner Bros.
- Producer: Alan Hull

Alan Hull chronology
| Pipedream (1973) | Squire (1975) | Phantoms (1979) |

Squire
Review scores
| Source | Rating |
|---|---|
| AllMusic | 4/5 stars |

Squire is the second solo album by Alan Hull. The album was recorded at Morgan Studios during December 1974 and January 1975, except "Waiting" which was recorded at Trident Studios with Roy Baker in March 1973. Squire was released on Warner Brothers, K56121, in 1975.

== Track listing ==
Side one

1. "Squire" – 5:07
2. "Dan The Plan" – 4:09
3. "Picture (A Little Girl)" – 2:53
4. "Nuthin' Shakin' (But the Leaves on the Trees)" – 3:42
5. "One More Bottle of Wine" – 4:10

Side two

1. "Golden Oldies" – 3:47
2. "I'm Sorry Squire" – 3:56
3. "Waiting" – 3:40
4. "Bad Side of Town" – 3:53
5. "Mr. Inbetween" – 2:30
6. "The End" – 0:38

All songs written by Alan Hull (©Hazy Music); except "Nuthin' Shakin'" (Eddie Fontaine, Cirino Colacrai, Diane Lampert, John Gluck, Jr., ©Jewel Music).

== Personnel ==
- Alan Hull – electric & acoustic guitar, percussion, Mellotron, recorders, piano, lead & backing vocals
- Kenny Craddock – electric, acoustic, catgut & 12-string guitar, percussion, vibes, organ, electric & acoustic piano, Mellotron, Mini-Korg, whistling
- Colin Gibson – bass guitar, percussion
- Ray Laidlaw – drums
- Ray Jackson – harp, mandolin, flatulette
- Terry Popple – drums
- Micky Moody – electric guitar
- Brian Chatton – piano
- Albert Lee – electric guitar
- Jean Roussel – organ
- Jo Newman – backing vocals
- Lesley Duncan – backing vocals
- Orchestra arranged and conducted by Jean Roussel
- Engineered by Mike Bobak
- Produced by Alan Hull
- Cut by George Peckham
