= Back to Basics (Alan Hull album) =

Live album by Alan Hull
- Released: 1994
- Recorded: January 1994
- Genre: Folk rock, folk
- Length: 59:58
- Label: Mooncrest Records
- Producer: Alan Hull

Alan Hull chronology
| Another Little Adventure (1988) | Back to Basics (1994) | Statues & Liberties (1996) |

Back to Basics
Review scores
| Source | Rating |
|---|---|
| AllMusic | 4.5/5 stars |

Back to Basics is a 1994 live album recording by Alan Hull. Backed by Kenny Craddock, the album was recorded live at the Mean Fiddler and Blackheath Halls in London in January 1994.

== Track listing ==
All tracks were composed by Alan Hull, except where noted.

1. "United States of Mind"
2. "Poor Old Ireland"
3. "All Fall Down"
4. "Lady Eleanor"
5. "Winter Song"
6. "Walk in the Sea"
7. "Mother Russia" (Kenny Craddock)
8. "This Heart of Mine" (Kevin Phillipson)
9. "Mr. Inbetween"
10. "January Song"
11. "Breakfast"
12. "Day of the Jackal"
13. "O No Not Again"
14. "Run for Home"
15. "Fog on the Tyne"

== Personnel ==
- Alan Hull – guitar, vocals
- Kenny Craddock – guitar, keyboards, accordion, backing vocals
