= Sleepless Nights (Lindisfarne album) =

Back and Fourth

Studio album by Lindisfarne
- Released: 1982
- Recorded: 1982
- Studio: Ridge Farm Studio, Chipping Norton; Marquee Studios, London
- Genre: Folk rock
- Length: 43:49
- Label: LMP Records
- Producer: Stephen Lipson

Lindisfarne chronology
The News (1979)	Back and Fourth (1982)	Dance Your Life Away (1986)

Sleepless Nights is a 1982 album by English rock band Lindisfarne. It was the first album to be released on the group's own record label, and peaked at position 59 in the UK album charts.

== Production ==
Sleepless Nights was produced and engineered by Stephen Lipson. It was recorded at Ridge Farm Studio, Chipping Norton and Marquee Studios.

The album was the first to be released on Lindisfarne's own record label.

== Chart performance, single releases and critical response ==
Sleepless Nights appeared in the UK album charts at #59 in October 1982. This proved to be the album's peak position, and it spent only three weeks in the chart.

Three tracks from the album were released as singles. The first, "I Must Stop Going To Parties", received a large amount of radio airplay but did not chart. It was followed by "Sunderland Boys" and "Nights", both of which proved unsuccessful.

The album received mixed reviews. Bruce Elder of Allmusic rated the album at only two out of five stars. Duke Egbert, writing for The Daily Vault, stated in a review of the 1999 live album Live At The Cambridge Folk Festival that he considered Sleepless Nights to be one of the "highlights of the band's career". In his 2004 BBC Radio 2 review of The River Sessions, Clive Pownceby praised two tracks from the album, "Same Way Down" and "Nights".

== Track listing ==
All tracks credited to Alan Hull except where indicated

1. "Nights" - 4:11
2. "Start Again" - 3:32
3. "Cruising to Disaster" - 4:02
4. "Same Way Down" - 3:26
5. "Winning the Game" (Ray Jackson, Charlie Harcourt) - 4:22
6. "About You" - 4:13
7. "Sunderland Boys" (Rod Clements) - 3:31
8. "Love Is a Pain" - 2:31
9. "Do What I Want" - 3:11
10. "Never Miss the Water" - 3:51
11. "I Must Stop Going To Parties" - 3:09
12. "Stormy Weather" - 3:50

== Personnel ==
Lindisfarne

- Alan Hull - vocals, acoustic, electric and 12-string guitars, keyboards
- Ray Jackson - vocals, mandolin, harmonica
- Rod Clements - electric bass, acoustic, electric and 12-string guitars, violin
- Simon Cowe - lead, acoustic and 12-string guitars, mandolin, vocals
- Ray Laidlaw - drums

Technical

- Max Norman, Stephen Lipson - engineer
