= Statues & Liberties =

1995 album by Alan Hull

Studio album by Alan Hull
- Released: 1996
- Recorded: 1995 at Wildtrax ('live at the Dead Pheasant'), County Durham
- Genre: Folk rock, folk
- Length: 52:31
- Label: Castle Communications
- Producer: Frank Gibbon, Dave Hull Denholm

Alan Hull chronology
Back to Basics (1994)	Statues & Liberties (1996)	When War Is Over (1998)

Statues & Liberties is the last solo album recorded by Lindisfarne frontman Alan Hull. He died on 17 November 1995 before work on the album had been completed.

== Track listing ==
All songs written by Alan Hull, except track 7 with Kevin Phillipson.

1. "Statues & Liberties"
2. "Walk a Crooked Mile"
3. "Cardboard Christmas Boxes"
4. "Treat Me Kindly"
5. "100 Miles to Liverpool"
6. "Money"
7. "This Heart of Mine"
8. "Long Way From Home"
9. "When The Gun Goes Down"
10. "Hoi Poloi"
11. "Save Yourself"
12. "Drug Song"
