= Rab Noakes =

Scottish musician (1947–2022)

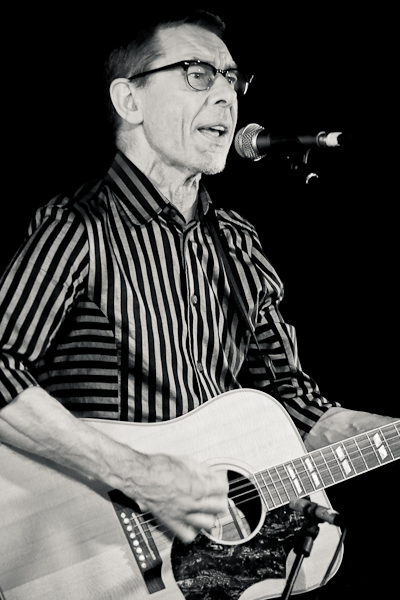
- Noakes at the Oran Mor, Glasgow, 2010

Background information
- Born: Robert Ogilvie Noakes; 13 May 1947; St Andrews, Fife, Scotland
- Origin: Cupar, Fife, Scotland
- Died: 11 November 2022 (aged 75) Glasgow, Scotland
- Genres: Folk, country
- Occupations: Singer-songwriter, musician, record producer
- Instruments: Vocals, guitar, keyboards
- Years active: 1970–2022
- Label: Neon Media production

Robert Ogilvie Noakes (13 May 1947 – 11 November 2022) was a Scottish singer-songwriter. He was at the forefront of Scottish folk music for over 50 years and recorded over 19 studio albums. He toured folk clubs and often performed at the Glasgow music festival Celtic Connections.

In 1970, Noakes released his first album, Do You See the Lights, a blend of easy-going country rock which included the songs "Too Old to Die", "Together Forever" and "Somebody Counts on Me". In 1971 he was a founding member of the folk rock band Stealers Wheel, along with Gerry Rafferty and Joe Egan. He played on Rafferty's Can I Have My Money Back, notably "Mary Skeffington". He recorded with Lindisfarne in 1972 on the songs "Turn a Deaf Ear", "Nicely Out of Tune", "Together Forever" and "Fog on the Tyne". He performed with Lindisfarne for a John Peel concert and in 1995 produced the BBC Radio 2 programme The Story of Lindisfarne. One of his best-known recordings, "Branch", from his Red Pump Special album, received airplay on BBC Radio 1. Noakes' songs have been covered by Lindisfarne and Barbara Dickson.

== Life and career ==
Noakes was born in St Andrews, Fife, on 13 May 1947 and brought up in Cupar.

In 1963, Noakes moved to London and worked for the Civil Service, where he played folk clubs at night. He returned to Scotland in 1967 and began a duo with Robin McKidd. They played their first gig at the Glasgow Folk centre. In the same year he secured a month's residency in Denmark.

Noakes released his first album, Do You See The Lights, in 1970 with a line-up that included McKidd on electric guitar and the Scottish jazz bassist Ronnie Rae. This recording included the songs "Too Old to Die", "Together Forever" and "Somebody Counts on Me".

Noakes was a founding member in 1971 of the folk rock band Stealers Wheel, along with Gerry Rafferty and Joe Egan. He sang backing vocals and played on Rafferty's first solo album, Can I Have My Money Back, most notably on "Mary Skeffington", a song about Rafferty's mother. After these sessions he became an early member of Stealers Wheel but left before the release of the band's first album.

Noakes recorded and performed with Lindisfarne, whom he supported on a national tour in 1972, and recorded his songs "Turn a Deaf Ear" on their first album, Nicely Out of Tune, and "Together Forever" on their second, Fog on the Tyne. Barbara Dickson recorded "Turn a Deaf Ear" on her album Do Right Woman, on which Noakes performed.

In May 1972 the British music magazine NME reported that Noakes was to appear at the Great Western Express Lincoln Festival on 26 May that year. Other acts to perform in the "Giants of Tomorrow" marquee included Budgie, Skin Alley, Tea & Sympathy, John Martyn, Warhorse and Gnidrolog. One of Noakes's best-known recordings, "Branch", was released as a single in 1974 from his album Red Pump Special, which was recorded in Nashville, Tennessee, and produced by Elliot Mazer. It had considerable airplay on BBC Radio 1 without making the UK Singles Chart.

The album Restless (1978) was produced by Terry Melcher at Starling Sounds based at Tittenhurst Park in Ascot, the former home of John Lennon and Yoko Ono and then owned by Ringo Starr. The albums Rab Noakes (1980) and Under the Rain (1984) followed, but it was not until 1994 that Standing Up appeared. Noakes subsequently toured with the Varaflames, containing Pick Withers, Rod Clements and the harmonicist Fraser Speirs.

== Later career and albums ==
Noakes became the senior producer for music programmes on BBC Radio Scotland. He left to create the production company Neon.

In November 2007 his album Unlimited Mileage, again with the Varaflames, was released. In 2012, CDs of Standing Up Again (made in 2009) and Just in Case (recorded in 2007) were made available, having only been available to download until then.

In 2015 he released the album I'm Walking Here. It was his 19th solo album and many of the songs tell the story of his working life as a songwriter and performer. It is a double album containing 26 songs. The first set consists of new compositions that show his gift for melody and love of Americana, and includes "Out of Your Sight", influenced by Buddy Holly, a tribute to a 1920s minstrel singer, and a poignant lament for Rafferty. The second album is dominated by "interpretations" (he hated the word "covers") of songs from early Cliff Richard to Garbage and Beck, along with the skiffle standard "Freight Train", on which he was joined by Jimmie MacGregor, and a finely sung treatment of the traditional "The Two Sisters".

On 20 July 2017, he appeared on the BBC quiz programme Eggheads.

== Personal life ==
In 1988 he met Stephanie Pordage and they married in 1998. She became his muse, manager and collaborator. They both left the BBC to set up their own production company, Neon, in 1995. Pordage died from the effects of Parkinson's disease in 2021. Noakes was diagnosed with tonsil cancer in 2015, but treatment was effective and he was back recording The Treatment Tapes in 2016. He also toured in 2017 at the Leith folk club and with a full band at Celtic Connections. In 2022 he continued to tour and work in collaboration with other singers.

Noakes died, suddenly, on 11 November 2022 at the age of 75 in hospital in Glasgow.

== Albums (including reissues) ==
Date	Artist	Label	Cat. #	Name
1970	Rab Noakes	Decca	SKL 5061	Do You See The Lights?
1972	Rab Noakes	A&M	AMLS 68119	Rab Noakes
1974	Rab Noakes	Warner Brothers	BS 2777	Red Pump Special
1975	Rab Noakes	Warner Brothers	K56114	Never Too Late
1978	Rab Noakes	Ringo O'	2339 201	Restless
1980	Rab Noakes	MCA	MCAC 3251	Rab Noakes
1984	Rab Noakes	Black Crow	(CD)CRO 207	Under The Rain
1988		Black Crow	(CD)CRO 217	Woody Lives!
1995	Rab Noakes	Mediart Music	MDMCD 003	Standing Up
2000	The Varaflames	Neon	NEONCD001	Throwing Shapes
2001	Rab Noakes With Fraser Speirs	Neon	NEONCD002	Lights Back On
2002	Rab Noakes	Neon	NEONCD004	Demos And Rarities Volume 1
2004	Rab Noakes	River Records	RIVERCD003	The River Sessions
2004	The Varaflames	River Records	RIVERCD042	Throwing Shapes (Re-issue)
2004	Rab Noakes With Fraser Speirs	River Records	RIVERCD043	Lights Back On (Re-issue)
2007	Rab Noakes	Neon	NEONCD007	Standing Up (Re-issue)
2007	Rab Noakes and the Varaflames	Neon	NEONCD009	Unlimited Mileage
2008	Rab Noakes	Neon	NEONCD010	Do You See The Lights? (Re-Issue)
2012	Rab Noakes	Neon	NEONCD011	Just in Case Songs Of Boudleaux & Felice Bryant
2012	Rab Noakes	Neon	NEONCD012	Live at the Reid Hall Edinburgh 2005
2012	Rab Noakes	Neon	NEONCD013	Standing Up Again
2013	Rab Noakes	Warner	WPCR15119	Red Pump Special (Re-issue)
2013	Rab Noakes	Warner	WPCR15120	Never Too Late
2013	Rab Noakes	Neon	NEONCD014	Demos And Rarities Volume 2 Adventures with Gerry Rafferty
2013	Rab Noakes	Neon	NEONCD015	Red Pump Special – 40th Anniversary Edition
2013	Rab Noakes	Universal	UICY75904	Rab Noakes (1972 Album Re-issue)
2014	Barbara Dickson & Rab Noakes	Neon	NEONCD016	Reunited EP
2015	Rab Noakes	Neon	NEONCD017	I'm Walkin' Here
2018	Rab Noakes	Neon	NEONCD021	Welcome to Anniversaryville
