= Ban This Filth! =

2012 book

Ban This Filth!: Letters from the Mary Whitehouse Archive 1963-2001
- First edition
- Editor: Ben Thompson
- Language: English
- Genre: Non-fiction
- Publisher: Faber & Faber
- Publication date: 2012
- Publication place: United Kingdom

Ban This Filth!: Letters from the Mary Whitehouse Archive 1963-2001 is a 2012 non-fiction book edited by Ben Thompson and published by Faber & Faber. It is a collection of letters written by Mary Whitehouse, leader of the National Viewers' and Listeners' Association, who perceived a coarsening of material in the BBC.

== Background ==
The author previously served as a ghost writer for books credited to famous people and wrote articles about music for publications.

== Contents ==
The book uses content about Whitehouse held at the NVLA archives at Essex University, which occupies 300 files. Jonathan Sale of The Daily Telegraph described some of the contents as "richly humorous".

According to Sale, the comments written by the editor were "droll". Karl Miller of the Irish Times described the style of the comments as "a smart, media-wise, Jack the Lad commentary that knows enough to recognise it’s right to ask: was she right?"

The editor argued that the changes Whitehouse advocated for would have negatively affected British culture, but he also believed that some of her points may have had merits. Martin Fletcher of The Independent wrote "From a liberal perspective, it's not the singularity of her opinions that unsettle, but rather the issues she got right".

== Reception ==
The Daily Telegraph ranked the book four of five stars, giving praise for the "relentlessly jaunty tone" in Thompson's commentary.

Stuart Jeffries of The Guardian described the book as "entertaining".

Fletcher praised the book's comments for being "admirably even-handed" and "witty and engaging".
