= Magic in the Air (disambiguation) =

"Magic in the Air" is a 2014 single by Ivorian musical group Magic System.

Magic in the Air may also refer to:

== Albums ==
- Magic in the Air, a 1978 live album by Lindisfarne
- Magic in the Air, a 1990 album by The Attack

== Songs ==
- "Magic in the Air", song by The Three Degrees single from New Dimensions, 1979
- "Magic in the Air", song by Badly Drawn Boy from 2000 album The Hour of Bewilderbeast
- "Magic in the Air", song by Kings of Convenience
- "Magic in the Air", also released as "I Feel Something in the Air", song by Cher 1966
- "Magic's in the Air," song by Esther Phillips, 1976
