= Back and Fourth (Lindisfarne album) =

1978 album by Lindisfarne

Studio album by Lindisfarne
- Released: 1978
- Recorded: February–April 1978
- Studio: Moonlight Studio, England; Rockfield Studios, Monmouth
- Genre: Rock
- Length: 38:26
- Label: (United Kingdom) Mercury (United States) Atco
- Producer: Gus Dudgeon

Lindisfarne chronology
Happy Daze (1975)	Back and Fourth (1978)	The News (1979)

Back and Fourth is a 1978 album by English rock band Lindisfarne. Released in nine countries on three record labels, it reached position 22 on the UK album charts and contained the successful single "Run for Home".

== Production ==
The album was produced by Gus Dudgeon and recorded between February and April 1978. It was the first album to feature the reformed original Lindisfarne lineup after they had broken up in 1973, hence the pun in the title that, although it was Lindisfarne's sixth studio album, the band was "back" on their fourth album with the original lineup.

The album cover is the band's first to show Lindisfarne, the island off the coast of Northumberland after which the band was named. Lindisfarne Castle can be seen at sunrise.

== Music ==
AllMusic stated that the album's sound is "rooted in midtempo rock".

== Release, chart performance and reception ==
Back and Fourth was released in June 1978 in the UK by Mercury Records. It spent eleven weeks on the UK album charts, reaching the highest position of No. 22, with a total of three weeks in the top 25. It was also released in eight other countries around the world on three different record labels.

Although it was a chart success, the album has not received entirely positive reviews. Bruce Eder of Allmusic retrospectively gave the album just two stars out of five, stating that it "isn't really that good a record, lacking the imagination and spirit of experimentation that highlighted their early albums". However, he did praise "Run For Home" as "Alan Hull's best song to date".

== Singles ==
Three tracks from the album were released as singles. The first, "Run For Home", was released a few weeks before the album. It proved very popular, reaching No. 10 during a 15-week stint in the UK charts. It also became the band's first hit in the USA, reaching #33. The arrangement features a prominent cor anglais. The second, "Juke Box Gypsy", was less successful. It was released in October 1978 and spent four weeks in the charts, peaking at #56. A third track, "Warm Feeling", was released in early 1979 but failed to chart.

== Track listing ==
All tracks credited to Alan Hull except where indicated

1. "Juke Box Gypsy" – 2:23
2. "Warm Feeling" (Ray Jackson, Charlie Harcourt) – 4:05
3. "Woman" – 3:26
4. "Only Alone" – 3:44
5. "Run For Home" – 4:21
6. "Kings Cross Blues" (Ray Jackson, Charlie Harcourt) – 3:45
7. "Get Wise" – 3:08
8. "You And Me" – 3:05
9. "Marshall Riley's Army" – 3:39
10. "Angels at Eleven" – 2:55
11. "Make Me Want To Stay" – 3:55

The U.S. edition of the album featured the same songs, but in a different running order.

== Charts ==
Chart (1978/79)	Peak position
UK (Official Charts Company)	22
Australia (Kent Music Report)	85

== Personnel ==
Lindisfarne

- Alan Hull – vocals, acoustic guitar, piano
- Ray Jackson – vocals, mandolin, percussion, harmonica
- Rod Clements – fretless bass, fiddle
- Simon Cowe – lead, acoustic and 12-string guitars, mandolin, banjo, vocals
- Ray Laidlaw – drums, percussion

Technical

- Bruce Baxter – string arrangement
- Dave Charles, Pat Moran, Phil Dunne, Stuart Epps – engineer
- Alan Schmidt – design concept, art direction
- Richard Haughton – cover photography

== Certifications ==
Region	Certification	Certified units/sales
United Kingdom (BPI)	Silver	60,000^{^}
^{^} Shipments figures based on certification alone.
