= Jack the Lad =

British folk rock group formed in 1973

- Origin: North East England
- Genres: British folk rock, rock music
- Years active: 1973–76 and 1993–2003
- Labels: Charisma; Elektra; United Artists
- Past members: Rod Clements; Simon Cowe; Ray Laidlaw; Billy Mitchell; Phil Murray; Ian 'Walter' Fairbairn

Jack the Lad were a British folk rock group from North East England formed in 1973 by three former members of Lindisfarne, the most successful band of the period from the region. They moved from the progressive folk rock of Lindisfarne into much more traditional folk music territory and were, in the mid-1970, something of a northern counterpart to bands like Fairport Convention. They have also been seen as part of an important roots movement, rediscovering traditional Northumbrian music.

== History ==
=== Origins ===
After two highly successful albums, Lindisfarne's third album Dingly Dell (1972) was a commercial and critical failure and the band split, with main songwriter Alan Hull going off to perform solo projects and eventually reforming Lindisfarne with a new line-up later that year. The remaining members: Rod Clements (bass, violin, guitar, vocals), Simon Cowe (guitar, mandolin, banjo, vocals), and Ray Laidlaw (drums) formed Jack the Lad with future Lindisfarne member Billy Mitchell (guitar, banjo, vocals).

They had originally thought of calling themselves the Corvettes, but decided it would make them sound too much like a rock 'n' roll revival outfit, and instead took their name from a phrase that Status Quo had used when they and Lindisfarne were touring Australia together earlier that year. The phrase "Jack the Lad" is British slang for a "flashy, cocksure young man". The phrase may have its origins in a traditional British song called "Jack's the Lad", but the first recorded use of 'Jack the Lad' was in the 1969 film Performance.

=== It's Jack the Lad 1973–74 ===
While Lindisfarne without them had become a harder rocking outfit, Jack the Lad retained much of the folksy spirit, warmth and good humour of the original group. Though his talents had previously been overshadowed by the more prolific songsmith Hull, Clements, who had penned Lindisfarne's first hit single "Meet Me On the Corner", contributed three tracks, which in the view of some fans and critics was the equal of anything Lindisfarne produced at around the same time. Simon Cowe contributed two tracks while Billy Mitchell wrote or co-wrote five tracks. The remaining five titles were those featured in the traditional instrumental medley collectively named "A Corny Pastiche".

Lindisfarne's record label, Charisma Records, decided to keep the band under contract and the first line-up of Jack the Lad recorded one album for them, It's Jack the Lad which was released in 1974, and two singles, "One More Dance" (1973), and "Why Can't I Be Satisfied" (1974). The album was released in the US by Elektra Records, which had been Lindisfarne's American label. Neither single charted, though they received positive reviews for their records and live performances which began to gain a reputation for outlandish entertainment. The traditional roots of the band were evident in an 8-minute medley of jigs, reels and polkas on their first album, which staked a claim to their being in part a Geordie answer to Fairport Convention and a guest appearance on "Song Without a Band" for Steeleye Span's Maddy Prior. The band toured with Ralph McTell, who was then at the height of his fame, post "Streets of London".

=== Northern folk rock, 1974–75 ===
Clements left in late 1974 and was replaced by two former members of northern folk rock band Hedgehog Pie, Ian 'Walter' Fairbairn (guitar, mandolin, violin, banjo, vocals) and Phil Murray (bass, vocals), which inevitably, together with the loss of a main songwriter, gave the band a much more traditional focus. This may have helped them gain greater acceptance in the folk world, and they headlined the Cambridge Folk Festival in 1974. On the second album The Old Straight Track (1974), five of the eleven tracks were traditional songs, three of the rest were written by Cowe with Mitchell only contributing one this time. The album was very well received and was voted Folk Album of the Year by Melody Maker.

The third album Rough Diamonds, which also featured musical and artistic contributions from Lindisfarne's Ray Jackson, and the single "Gentleman Soldier" (both 1975), were both produced by Fairport Convention stalwart Simon Nicol. The latter, which featured John Kirkpatrick on button accordion, was a new arrangement of a traditional song which borrowed the vocal four-part harmony break from "Twist and Shout" for the introduction, and featured a Scottish accordion reel back to back with a mock-heavy rock guitar solo. Presenter John Peel placed it at No.3 in his favourite singles of the year, calling it "one of the most joyous records I've heard in my life". But like all previous attempts it failed to chart.. Song-writing was split with Cowe and Mitchell contributing four songs each with the remaining three being traditional songs.

=== Disbandment and reformation ===
With no great commercial success forthcoming the band were dropped by Charisma and moved to United Artists. Cowe left shortly before the group recorded their final album, 'Jackpot', (1976). The need for success pushed this closer to pop and rock territory than its predecessors, with only two traditional tracks. With Cowe having left, Mitchell assumed the main songwriting duties contributing six tracks, the remaining two being cover versions, It featured Andy Bown on keyboards, and a brass section on some tracks. Despite the return to a more commercial sound chart success still eluded them. The 'Jackpot' UK tour in Sep/Oct '76, bizarrely coupled with the NZ punk/goth orientated Split Enz did neither act any favours.

Laidlaw left to join Radiator and the group disbanded soon afterward. Lindisfarne had split in early 1975, but Clements, Cowe and Laidlaw continued to join founder members Alan Hull and Ray Jackson to play Christmas concerts in their native Newcastle upon Tyne each year, and the response was so positive in 1977 that the original five reformed the following year and continued to record and perform until 2003. As a result of the continued interest, Jack the Lad's albums were eventually released as CDs. Following this in 1993 Jack The Lad re-formed in as both the original band running side-by-side with their Lindisfarne commitments, and as a festival act which included Mitchell, Fairbairn and Murray.

== Significance ==
Jack the Lad were one example of the music scene that flourished in the North-east of England in the late 1960s and early 1970s producing acts such as Animals, Lindisfarne and Hedgehog Pie. The shift from progressive folk rock into more traditional folk rock territory partly reflected the popularity of the genre at the time but also has been seen as part of a process of rediscovering regional musical roots that has continued with figures such as Kathryn Tickell and Nancy Kerr.

== Band members ==
- Rod Clements – bass, violin, guitar, vocals
- Simon Cowe – guitar, mandolin, banjo, vocals
- Ray Laidlaw – drums
- Billy Mitchell – guitar, banjo, vocals
- Phil Murray – bass, vocals
- Ian 'Walter' Fairbairn – guitar, mandolin, violin, banjo, vocals

== Discography ==
Singles

- 'One More Dance' / 'Draught Genius (Polka)' (1973)
- 'Why Can't I be Satisfied' / 'Make me Happy' (1973)
- 'Home Sweet Home' / 'Big Ocean Liner' (1975)
- 'Gentleman Soldier' / 'Oakey Strike Evictions' (1975)
- 'My Friend the Drink' / 'Rocking Chair' (1975)
- 'Eight Ton Crazy' / 'Walters Drop' (1976)
- 'Trinidad' / 'Let It Be Me' (1976)

Albums

- It's Jack the Lad (Charisma, 1974)
- The Old Straight Track (Charisma, 1974)
- Rough Diamonds (Charisma, 1975)
- Jackpot (United Artists, 1976)

DVD

- On the Road Again (1993)
