= Nicely Out of Tune =

Studio album by Lindisfarne
- Released: November 1970
- Recorded: 1970
- Genre: Folk rock
- Length: 52 mins
- Label: (United Kingdom) Charisma (United States) Elektra
- Producer: John Anthony

Lindisfarne chronology
Nicely Out of Tune (1970)	Fog on the Tyne (1971)

Nicely Out of Tune is the debut album by Lindisfarne, released in late 1970. It charted more than a year after release, thanks to the huge success of their second album Fog on the Tyne, which topped the charts early in 1972.

"Lady Eleanor" and "Clear White Light (Pt. 2)" were both released as singles. The former was reactivated once the group became successful, and gave them a No. 3 hit in 1972. "We Can Swing Together", a song written by Hull about an abortive police raid on a party, became one of their favourites on stage, featuring an extended medley of traditional folk tunes played on harmonica by Ray Jackson. A live version can be found on the group's Lindisfarne Live, recorded in 1971 and released in 1973, and as a bonus track on their third album, Dingly Dell. Elvis Costello singled out "Winter Song" as one of the greatest songs ever.

The title of the seventh track, "Alan in the River With Flowers", is a parody of The Beatles' song "Lucy in the Sky with Diamonds", and was given its original title of "Float Me Down the River" on the American version. The "flatulette" was actually one of the band members blowing raspberries during the instrumental break in "Down".

== Critical reception ==
Professional ratings
Review scores
Source	Rating
AllMusic	4.5/5 stars

Bruce Eder of AllMusic praised Nicely Out of Tune as "easily the best album the group ever recorded".

== Track listing ==
All songs written by Alan Hull except where stated

1. "Lady Eleanor"
2. "Road to Kingdom Come" (Rod Clements)
3. "Winter Song"
4. "Turn a Deaf Ear" (Rab Noakes)
5. "Clear White Light (Pt. 2)"
6. "We Can Swing Together"
7. "Alan in the River with Flowers"
8. "Down"
9. "The Things I Should Have Said" (Clements)
10. "Jackhammer Blues" (Woody Guthrie)
11. "Scarecrow Song"

Bonus tracks on CD reissue:

1. "Knackers Yard Blues" (Clements) (B-side of "Clear White Light (Pt. 2)" single)
2. "Nothing But the Marvellous Is Beautiful" (B-side of "Lady Eleanor" single)

== Personnel ==
Lindisfarne

- Alan Hull - vocals, acoustic guitar, 12-string guitar, organ, piano, electric piano
- Ray Jackson - vocals, mandolin, harmonica, flatulette (blown raspberry)
- Rod Clements - electric bass, organ, piano, violin, guitars, vocals
- Simon Cowe - lead, acoustic and 12-string guitars, mandolin, banjo, vocals
- Ray Laidlaw - drums

== Charts ==
Chart (1970–72)	Peak position
UK (Official Charts Company)	8
Australia (Kent Music Report)	44
