= Afraid of Mice =

English new wave/post-punk band

- Origin: Liverpool, England
- Genres: New wave, post-punk
- Years active: 1979–1987, 2014–2015
- Labels: Charisma
- Past members: Philip Franz Jones; Geoff Kelly; Roddie Gilliard; Sam Brew; Clive Gee; Terry Sterling; Shaun McLaughlin; Mark Singleton

Afraid of Mice were an English new wave/post-punk band from Liverpool, England, formed in 1979. They released five singles between 1981 and 1982, and one self-titled album in 1981 on the Charisma label.

== History ==
Prior to Afraid of Mice, Philip Franz Jones had already been in various Liverpool bands since the early seventies, such as Skyfall and Next. The band was formed in Liverpool in 1979 by Jones (vocals, sax, flute, keyboards), together with Geoff Kelly (bass, vocals) Roddie Gilliard (guitar) and Clive Gee (drums). Before settling on Afraid of Mice, they were called Beano, The Press, and The Jones, and recorded a collection of original Phil Jones songs as demos.

Changing their name to Afraid of Mice, they had two of the demos released on the A Trip to the Dentist compilation, issued by Skeleton Records, which led to the band being signed by Charisma Records. Sam Brew later replaced Roddie Gilliard.

Working alongside producer Tony Visconti, their self-titled debut album was released in 1981. It was dismissed by Trouser Press reviewer Dave Schulps as "humorless Bowiesque dance-rock". Several singles were taken from the album, none of them reaching the charts.

Despite having a fan following, the album did not sell well. A second album was planned, but was never completed after Charisma was taken over by Virgin Records and producer Anne Dudley was taken off the project. This eventually led to Afraid of Mice leaving Charisma, and the band released some of the tracks recorded for the album, as well as other unreleased tracks as The White Album in 1983. They disbanded in 1987.

The band reformed for some live shows in 2014 and 2015.

== Post-split activities ==
Jones teamed up with Alex McKechnie in 1984 to form the duo Two's a Crowd (later renamed to Up and Running), while at the time still continuing with Afraid of Mice, and remains a constant presence in the Liverpool music scene, performing at pubs, clubs and at music festivals.

Kelly now works at The City of Liverpool College as a support worker and has formed his own band called G.L.I.B. He has posted songs on his SoundCloud page known as Glib Kelly.

Mark Singleton, guitarist and keyboard player from the mid-1980s lineup, went on to form Now Hear This, and wrote the 2014 book The Art of Gigging: The Essential Guide to Starting up as a Performing Artist.

== Discography ==
=== Albums ===
- Afraid of Mice (1981), Charisma
- The White Album (1983) (self-released)

=== Singles ===
- "Intercontinental" (1981), Charisma
- "I'm on Fire" (1981), Charisma
- "Medley: Popstar, Bad News, Taking It Easy, Important" (1981), Charisma - flexi-disc
- "Popstar" (1981), Charisma
- "Transparents" (1982), Charisma
- "What About Me" (live) (1982), Charisma - flexi-disc
- "At the Club" (1982), Charisma

=== Compilation appearances ===
- "Transparents" and "I'm Not a Fighter" (original The Press demos) appear on the compilation A Trip to the Dentist (1980)
- "Don't Take Your Love Away" on Jobs for the Boys (1985)
