= Lady Eleanor =

1971 single by Lindisfarne

Single by Lindisfarne
- A-side: "Lady Eleanor"
- B-side: "Nothing But The Marvellous Is Beautiful"
- Released: 1971
- Recorded: 1970
- Genre: Folk rock
- Label: Charisma (UK), Philips (Eire, Continental Europe & Australasia), Elektra (North America)
- Songwriter: Alan Hull (both sides)
- Producer: John Anthony

"Lady Eleanor" is a song written by Alan Hull, featured on the first Lindisfarne album, Nicely Out of Tune. Initially released as a single in May 1971, it failed to chart. In 1972, following the success of the band's single "Meet me on the Corner" (which reached No. 5 in the UK), and the highly successful second album Fog on the Tyne, a remixed version was released (but with the same catalogue number as the original - CB.153) and became their second consecutive hit single, reaching Number 3 in the UK charts. Its B-Side was "Nothing But the Marvellous is Beautiful".

The song features the folk rock band Lindisfarne's characteristic combination of mandolin playing (by Ray Jackson) and close harmony singing. Its lyrics are inspired by Edgar Allan Poe's short stories "Eleonora" and "The Fall of the House of Usher".

The verse is in the key of B minor, while the chorus is in the relative key of D major. Simon Cowe's lead guitar work betrays the influence of Peter Green, while the song's instrumental coda - like Green's hit composition "Man of the World" - ends on a D major sixth chord.

== Charts ==
Chart (1971/72)	Peak position
UK (Official Charts Company)	3
Australia (Kent Music Report)	45
Canada (RPM)	68
USA (Billboard 100)	83

== Cover versions ==
The song has been covered by a number of acts, including Caterina Caselli, American Gypsy and Lemon.
