= Dingly Dell =

1972 studio album by Lindisfarne

Studio album by Lindisfarne
- Released: September 1972
- Recorded: 14–16 July 1972
- Studio: Island Studios, Basing Street, Notting Hill, London
- Genre: Folk rock; hard rock
- Label: (United Kingdom) Charisma Records; Elektra Records
- Producer: Bob Johnston

Lindisfarne chronology
Fog on the Tyne (1971)	Dingly Dell (1972)	Lindisfarne Live (1973)

Dingly Dell is a 1972 album by English rock band Lindisfarne.

== Production ==
The album was produced by and mixed by Bob Johnston, who had also worked on the earlier No. 1 album Fog on the Tyne. However, the band were unhappy with the album, and remixed it themselves shortly before it was released.

== Release and chart performance ==
Dingly Dell was released in September 1972. It spent ten weeks in the UK album charts, entering at No. 5 and never going above this position.

Two songs from the album were released as singles, "All Fall Down" and "Court in the Act". The former was a minor success, charting at No. 34 in the UK, while the latter failed to chart.

On its original British release, it appeared in a matt pale sepia cardboard sleeve, blank except for the name of the album and the band, with all the information contained on the inner sleeve and a sepia poster of the band inside. This was at their insistence, on the grounds that it was the music which mattered.

== Reception ==
Professional ratings
Review scores
Source	Rating
AllMusic	4/5 stars

The album was in general not as well received as previous Lindisfarne releases. The band's official website describes it as "a disappointment", although it praises the single "All Fall Down". Some contemporary reviews were relatively positive, including one from the Milwaukee Journal. Bruce Eder, writing for AllMusic in 2004, gave the album a rating of four stars. He described the band's playing as "spirited" and the songs as "enjoyable", and suggested that the rock press "savaged the album unfairly". Live Music Magazine considered that the album "had a very crisp sound, very upfront, and more of a mainstream hard rock sound", but felt that "this was not the move that the critics had wanted or expected of the band", and that "the songwriting didn't match the prior two albums".

== Track listing ==
All tracks credited to Alan Hull except where indicated

1. "All Fall Down" – 3:47
2. "Plankton's Lament" (Cowe) – 1:55
3. "Bring Down The Government" – 1:30
4. "Poor Old Ireland" – 3:02
5. "Don't Ask Me" (Clements) – 3:37
6. "O No Not Again" – 3:24
7. "Dingle Regatta" (Traditional; arranged by Lindisfarne) – 1:04
8. "Wake Up Little Sister" – 2:53
9. "Go Back" (Cowe) – 3:02
10. "Court in the Act" – 3:17
11. "Mandolin King" – 2:37
12. "Dingly Dell" – 6:19

Bonus track on CD reissue:

1. "We Can Swing Together" (Live) – 17:58

== Charts ==
Chart (1972/73)	Peak position
UK (Official Charts Company)	5
Australia (Kent Music Report)	38

== Personnel ==
Lindisfarne

- Alan Hull - vocals, acoustic, electric and 12-string guitars, keyboards, bass
- Ray Jackson - vocals, mandolin, harmonica
- Rod Clements - electric bass, acoustic, electric and 12-string guitars, violin
- Simon Cowe - lead, acoustic and 12-string guitars, mandolin, harmonium, vocals
- Ray Laidlaw - drums

with:

- Paul Laidlaw - orchestral arrangements, conductor
- Bob Potter - engineer
