= Kenny Craddock =

British musician, composer, and producer

- Born: Kenneth Craddock; 18 April 1950; Wrekenton, Gateshead, England
- Died: 30 May 2002 (aged 52) near Monchique, Portugal
- Instruments: Keyboards; guitar; vocals
- Website: kennycraddock.com

Kenny Craddock (18 April 1950 – 30 May 2002) was a British musician, composer, and producer. Throughout his career he worked with artists including Ringo Starr, Ginger Baker, Billy Bragg, Gerry Rafferty and Alan White. He collaborated with Alan Hull and Lindisfarne, joining the band in 1973 and remaining with them until their temporary split in 1975, and acted as musical director for Van Morrison and Mary Black. He performed using a variety of instruments on Alan Hull's 1979 solo album Phantoms.

Craddock began touring with Van Morrison in the early 1980s, playing keyboards until around 1985. Craddock, though, had written a song based upon a W. B. Yeats poem called "Before the World", which Morrison said he would like to record. "Before the World Was Made" was adapted by Morrison with music by Craddock, and appeared on the 1993 album Too Long in Exile.

In the 1990s, he provided, with Colin Gibson, the incidental music to Steven Moffat's sitcom Joking Apart. Craddock himself performed the show's theme song, a cover version of Chris Rea's "Fool (If You Think It's Over)". Around this time, Craddock toured with Paul Brady.

Craddock moved to Portugal in 2001, where he died in a car crash after completing his first solo album, Mad as the Mist and Snow.
