= Fog on the Tyne =

1971 studio album by Lindisfarne

Studio album by Lindisfarne
- Released: October 15 1971
- Recorded: 1971
- Studios: Trident Studios, Soho, London
- Genre: Folk rock
- Length: 35:06
- Labels: Charisma; Elektra
- Producer: Bob Johnston

Lindisfarne chronology
Nicely Out of Tune (1970)	Fog on the Tyne (1971)	Dingly Dell (1972)

Professional ratings
Review scores
Source	Rating
Allmusic	4.5/5 stars
Christgau's Record Guide	C+

Fog on the Tyne is a 1971 album by English rock band Lindisfarne. Bob Johnston produced the album, which was recorded at Trident Studios in Soho, London, in mid 1971 and released in October that year on Charisma Records in the U.K. and Elektra Records in the U.S.

It gave the group their breakthrough in the U.K., topping the UK Albums Chart early in 1972 for four weeks and remaining on the chart for 56 weeks in total. "Meet Me on the Corner", one of two songs written by bassist Rod Clements, reached No. 5 as a single. The title track became the band's signature tune. Simon Cowe made his debut as a writer, contributing the song "Uncle Sam".

Both tracks on the B-side of "Meet Me on the Corner", "Scotch Mist" (an instrumental), and "No Time To Lose", appeared as bonus tracks when the album was reissued on CD.

A heavily reworked version of the title track, with vocals by footballer Paul Gascoigne, was released on 29 October 1990 under the title "Fog on the Tyne (Revisited)", credited to Gazza and Lindisfarne. It reached number two on the UK singles chart.

Reggae group The Pioneers recorded a version of "Alright on the Night" on their 1972 album I Believe in Love.

== Track listing ==
1. "Meet Me on the Corner" (Rod Clements) – 2:38 lead vocals: Ray Jackson
2. "Alright on the Night" (Alan Hull) – 3:32 lead vocals: Alan Hull, Ray Jackson and Simon Cowe
3. "Uncle Sam" (Simon Cowe) – 2:55 lead vocals: Ray Jackson
4. "Together Forever" (Rab Noakes) – 2:34 lead vocals: Ray Jackson
5. "January Song" (Hull) – 4:13 lead vocals: Alan Hull
6. "Peter Brophy Don't Care" (Hull, Terry Morgan) – 2:47 lead vocals: Alan Hull
7. "City Song" (Hull) – 3:06 lead vocals: Alan Hull
8. "Passing Ghosts" (Hull) – 2:28 lead vocals: Alan Hull
9. "Train in G Major" (Clements) – 3:08 lead vocals: Ray Jackson
10. "Fog on the Tyne" (Hull) – 3:23 lead vocals: Alan Hull, Ray Jackson and Simon Cowe

Bonus Tracks on CD reissue:

1. "Scotch Mist" (Clements, Cowe, Hull, Ray Jackson, Ray Laidlaw) – 2:06
2. "No Time to Lose" (Hull) – 3:16

== Charts ==
Chart (1972)	Peak position
UK (Official Charts Company)	1
Australia (Kent Music Report)	45
Canada (RPM)	53

The album was the eighth bestselling album of 1972. In 1990, footballer Paul Gascoigne reached number 2 in the UK Singles Chart with the song "Fog on the Tyne", a collaborative cover with Lindisfarne that earned him a gold disc.

== Personnel ==
Lindisfarne

- Alan Hull - vocals, acoustic, electric and 12-string guitars, keyboards
- Ray Jackson - vocals, mandolin, harmonica
- Rod Clements - electric bass, acoustic, electric and 12-string guitars, violin
- Simon Cowe - lead, acoustic and 12-string guitars, mandolin, vocals
- Ray Laidlaw - drums

Technical

- Ken Scott - engineer
- Trevor Wiles and Franco Polsinelli - sleeve
