= Simon Cowe =

British musical artist (1948-2015)

- Born: 1 April 1948; Newcastle upon Tyne, England
- Died: 30 September 2015 (aged 67) Toronto, Canada
- Genre: Folk rock
- Instruments: Guitar; mandolin; banjo; keyboards; vocals
- Years active: Late 1960s–2015
- Formerly of: Lindisfarne; Jack The Lad

Simon Cowe (1 April 1948 – 30 September 2015) was an English guitarist and multi-instrumentalist most noted as a member of the folk-rock group Lindisfarne from their original formation in 1970 until 1973, and then again from 1978 to his departure in 1993.

== Early life and career ==
Cowe, who was of Scottish descent,. was educated at King's School in Tynemouth and then at Fettes College, Edinburgh, where he studied piano and music theory under Michael Lester-Cribb.

In 1968, as lead guitarist, he teamed up with Ray Jackson, Rod Clements and Ray Laidlaw to form Downtown Faction, a blues band. After joining forces with folk singer-songwriter Alan Hull, the band became Lindisfarne.

== Major hit years (1970–1973) ==
Signed to Charisma Records in 1970, Lindisfarne made three best-selling albums over the next three years: Nicely Out of Tune, Fog on the Tyne and Dingly Dell. Two major British hit singles were also achieved: Rod Clements' "Meet Me on the Corner", which reached No.5, and Alan Hull's "Lady Eleanor", which peaked at No.3.

Cowe's compositions on these albums included "Uncle Sam" on Fog on the Tyne, and "Go Back" on Dingly Dell.

== Jack The Lad (1973–76) ==
Cowe, Clements and Laidlaw left Lindisfarne in 1973 to form Jack The Lad, an outfit with more obvious acoustic and traditional leanings than Lindisfarne. Other members who passed through this band's ranks were Billy Mitchell, Ian Walter Fairbairn and Phil Murray.

Cowe appeared on Jack The Lad's first three albums, It's...Jack The Lad, The Old Straight Track and Rough Diamonds'', all of which were issued on Charisma and included several compositions and arrangements by Cowe.

The final Jack The Lad album, Jackpot, was released on United Artists in 1976. Cowe did not appear on this album, but was credited as co-arranger on two tracks. A CD reissue included his composition "See How They Run".

== Second stint in Lindisfarne (1978–1993) ==
The original line-up of Lindisfarne re-formed in 1978 and scored a British Top 10 hit with "Run For Home" and a minor Top 75 entry with "Juke Box Gypsy", both written and sung by Alan Hull. Both were included on the band's reunion album Back and Fourth, which reached No.22.

Despite Lindisfarne's continuing popularity as a live act, subsequent albums such as Magic in the Air, The News, Sleepless Nights, Dance Your Life Away, C'mon Everybody, Amigos and Elvis Lives on the Moon, all of which featured Cowe, were less successful. The band did score a No.2 hit in 1990, however, with "Fog on the Tyne (Revisited)" in collaboration with footballer Paul Gascoigne.

Cowe played a variety of instruments on both Lindisfarne's and Jack The Lad's albums, including guitar, piano, keyboards, harmonium, accordion, mandolin, banjo and bouzouki.

== Later years ==
Cowe left Lindisfarne in 1993 to run a microbrewery in Toronto, Canada.

He rejoined some of his former colleagues on stage at Newcastle City Hall in 2005, as part of a tribute to Alan Hull, who had died in 1995.

Cowe died on 30 September 2015 in Toronto, after a long illness.
