= Charisma Records =

British record label

- Parent company: Universal Music Group
- Founded: 1969; 57 years ago
- Founder: Tony Stratton Smith
- Defunct: 1986; 40 years ago
- Distributors: EMI Records (United Kingdom); Capitol Music Group (United States)
- Genre: Progressive rock; comedy
- Country of origin: England

Charisma Records (also known as The Famous Charisma Label) was a British record label founded in 1969 by former journalist Tony Stratton Smith. He had previously acted as manager for rock bands such as the Nice, the Bonzo Dog Band and Van der Graaf Generator. Gail Colson was label manager and joint managing director.

The label's most successful acts were Genesis, Peter Gabriel, Julian Lennon, and Monty Python. The first release was the eponymous debut LP by Rare Bird, in December 1969, who gave Charisma its first hit single, "Sympathy", in early 1970. Besides the Nice, the Bonzo Dog Band and Van der Graaf Generator, the label also released material by Robert John Godfrey, Lindisfarne and Alan Hull, Hawkwind, the Alan Parsons Project, Clifford T. Ward, String Driven Thing, Jack the Lad, Audience, Vivian Stanshall, Brand X, John Betjeman, Malcolm McLaren, Charlie Drake, and Afraid of Mice. The 1970s solo albums of Peter Hammill, Tony Banks and Steve Hackett were also on Charisma.

Managing director Colson left Charisma in the late 1970s to form her own management company, Gailforce.

In 1983, Charisma Records was acquired by Virgin Records and continued to operate until 1986, when Virgin absorbed the label. In 1992, Virgin was purchased by EMI, then known as Thorn EMI. With most of EMI's purchase by Universal Music Group, Charisma returned to Virgin Records. A new version of Charisma, with no connection to the original label other than the name, operated between 1990 and 1992, with a street-oriented and independently distributed subsidiary called Cardiac Records. Some Charisma Records recordings were re-issued on the EMI label. In the UK, the label was revived by EMI's Angel Records in 2007.

== Distribution ==
Charisma was initially manufactured and distributed in the United Kingdom via a licensing deal with Lee Gopthal's B&C Records, sharing the B&C catalogue series for both singles and albums, prior to B&C ceasing to release records on the B&C label, when it concentrated on marketing instead. In early 1972, B&C brokered a deal with Precision Tapes to manufacture and distribute Charisma's albums in tape format. From early 1970, Charisma's European distribution was handled by Phonogram Inc.

In the United States and Canada, Charisma recordings were initially licensed to other labels. These included ABC Records, along with subsidiaries, Impulse, Probe and Dunhill. Artists included Van der Graaf Generator and Genesis. Elektra Records in the US released records by Charisma artists Atomic Rooster, Audience, Lindisfarne and Jack the Lad.

In 1971, Charisma entered into a distribution agreement with Buddah Records and began to release albums on the Charisma label in the US. These included Pawn Hearts by Van der Graaf Generator and Nursery Cryme, Foxtrot and Genesis Live by Genesis. Atlantic Records also later released Charisma recordings in the United States from 1973 to 1974 including many Genesis titles.

In 1973, Atlantic stopped distributing Charisma in America; as a result, in the US Charisma's bands signed to various labels such as Mercury Records (Van der Graaf Generator) and Arista Records (Monty Python). Genesis records were released in the US under Atlantic's subsidiary label Atco Records from 1974 to 1976. In 1976, Charisma signed a new distribution deal in the UK with Polydor that lasted until 1980. In Canada, many Charisma releases were distributed by GRT and PolyGram Canada.

Between 1980 and 1982, Charisma operated a subsidiary called Pre Records, who were devoted to new wave and reggae acts. Pre's roster included Scars, Prince Far I, Delta 5, Gregory Isaacs, the Monochrome Set and Congo Ashanti Roy, amongst others. Pre also licensed albums by the Residents and Tuxedomoon from the American label Ralph Records. In Europe, Pre's releases were issued on the Charisma label.

== Collectable "pink scroll" label design ==
Charisma's first UK label was a distinctive magenta scroll design (though it is generally referred to in record collecting circles as "pink scroll") – magenta was the colour that Stratton Smith chose to represent the label, and this was reflected in his later horseracing colours, red for Manchester United, green for Brazil, and magenta for Charisma. Its second logo, used beginning in 1972, of John Tenniel's drawing of the Mad Hatter, sometimes combined with a montage of other images from Alice's Adventures in Wonderland, made the label instantly recognizable.

Most Charisma artists were relatively unknown early on, so original pressings have become quite rare and sought after by collectors. The "pink scroll" label was first used in the UK from 1969 until mid-1972. This was replaced by the Mad Hatter label, designed by Paul Whitehead. In the US, the pink scroll labels were used in late 1973 and early 1974 on releases distributed by Buddah. Releases distributed by Atlantic Records used a variation of the Mad Hatter design.

Much of the early distinctive artwork used by the label was created by Paul Whitehead. Whitehead's original illustrations for three Genesis albums were stolen from the Charisma archives when it was sold to Virgin Records in 1983. Whitehead claimed that Charisma staff got wind of the imminent sale and proceeded to loot its office.

== Notable releases ==
=== Albums ===
| Year | Artist | Album | Charts | Certifications |
|---|---|---|---|---|
| 1969 | Van der Graaf Generator | The Least We Can Do Is Wave to Each Other | UK #47 | |
| 1970 | The Nice | Five Bridges | UK #2 | |
| 1970 | Lindisfarne | Nicely Out of Tune | UK #8 | |
| 1971 | The Nice | Elegy | UK #5 | |
| 1971 | Lindisfarne | Fog on the Tyne | UK #1 | |
| 1971 | Van der Graaf Generator | Pawn Hearts | ITA #1 | |
| 1971 | Genesis | Nursery Cryme | UK #39 | FRA: Gold |
| 1972 | Lindisfarne | Dingly Dell | UK #5 | |
| 1972 | Bo Hansson | Music Inspired by Lord of the Rings | UK #34, US #154 | AUS, UK: Gold |
| 1972 | Genesis | Foxtrot | UK #12 | FRA, UK: Gold |
| 1973 | Genesis | Genesis Live | UK #9 | |
| 1973 | Lindisfarne | Lindisfarne Live | UK #25 | |
| 1973 | Clifford T. Ward | Home Thoughts | UK #40 | |
| 1973 | Alan Hull | Pipedream | UK #29 | |
| 1973 | Genesis | Selling England by the Pound | UK #3 | FRA, UK, US: Gold |
| 1974 | Genesis | The Lamb Lies Down on Broadway | UK #10 | FRA, UK, US: Gold |
| 1975 | Steve Hackett | Voyage of the Acolyte | UK #26 | UK: Silver |
| 1976 | Genesis | A Trick of the Tail | UK #3, NLD #7, US #31 | FRA, UK, US: Gold |
| 1976 | The Alan Parsons Project | Tales of Mystery and Imagination | US #38 | GER: Gold |
| 1976 | Hawkwind | Astounding Sounds, Amazing Music | UK #33 | |
| 1976 | Genesis | Wind & Wuthering | UK #7, US #26 | FRA, UK, US: Gold |
| 1977 | Peter Gabriel | Peter Gabriel | FRA #5, NOR #5, UK #7, SWE #8, GER #9, ITA #9, NLD #9, US #38 | FRA, GER, UK: Gold |
| 1977 | Brand X | Moroccan Roll | UK #37 | |
| 1977 | Hawkwind | Quark, Strangeness and Charm | UK #30 | |
| 1977 | Genesis | Seconds Out | UK #4 | |
| 1978 | Genesis | ...And Then There Were Three... | GER #2, UK #3, NOR #7, NLD #8, US #14 | US: Platinum, FRA, GER, UK: Gold |
| 1978 | Steve Hackett | Please Don't Touch | UK #38 | |
| 1978 | Peter Gabriel | Peter Gabriel | FRA #2, UK #10 | |
| 1979 | Tony Banks | A Curious Feeling | UK #21 | |
| 1979 | Steve Hackett | Spectral Mornings | UK #22 | |
| 1980 | Genesis | Duke | UK #1, GER #2, FRA #4, NOR #4, SWE #9, US #11 | UK, US: Platinum, FRA: Gold |
| 1980 | Peter Gabriel | Peter Gabriel | FRA #1, UK #1, NOR #5, CAN #7, SWE #8, US #22 | CAN: 2× Platinum, FRA, UK, US: Gold |
| 1980 | Steve Hackett | Defector | UK #9 | |
| 1980 | The Residents | The Commercial Album | | |
| 1981 | Steve Hackett | Cured | UK #15 | |
| 1981 | Genesis | Abacab | UK #1, NOR #4, GER #6, NLD #6, US #7 | US: 2× Platinum, FRA, GER, UK: Gold |
| 1982 | Genesis | Three Sides Live | UK #2, NLD #6, US #10 | US: Gold |
| 1982 | Peter Gabriel | Peter Gabriel | CAN #2, FRA #5, UK #6, SWE #10, US #28 | CAN: Platinum, UK, US: Gold |
| 1983 | Malcolm McLaren | Duck Rock^{2} | UK #18 | UK: Silver |
| 1983 | Steve Hackett | Highly Strung | UK #16 | |
| 1983 | Peter Gabriel | Plays Live | UK #8 | |
| 1983 | Genesis | Genesis^{1} | GER #1, UK #1, AUT #2, NLD #2, NOR #2, SWI #2, FRA #5 | UK: 2× Platinum, FRA, GER: Platinum |
| 1984 | Julian Lennon | Valotte | AUS #8, US #17, UK #20 | US: Platinum, UK: Silver |
| 1986 | Peter Gabriel | So^{3} | CAN #1, NLD #1, NOR #1, NZ #1, UK #1, GER #2, SWE #2, US #2 | US: 5× Platinum, UK: 3× Platinum, GER, NLD: Platinum, FRA: Gold |
| 1986 | Genesis | Invisible Touch^{1} | UK #1, GER #2, NLD #2, NOR #3, SWE #4, SWI #4, AUT #5, FRA #8 | UK: 4× Platinum, FRA, GER: Platinum |
| 1986 | The World's Famous Supreme Team | Rappin' | | |

1: On Virgin Records in Australia, Atlantic Records in the US
2: On Island Records in the US
3: On Geffen Records in the US

live album

=== Singles ===
| Year | Artist | Single | Charts | Certification |
|---|---|---|---|---|
| 1970 | Rare Bird | "Sympathy" | FRA #1, ITA #1, UK #27 | |
| 1971 | Lindisfarne | "Lady Eleanor" | UK #3 | |
| 1971 | Lindisfarne | "Meet Me on the Corner" | UK #5 | |
| 1973 | Clifford T. Ward | "Gaye" | UK #8 | |
| 1974 | Genesis | "I Know What I Like (In Your Wardrobe)" | UK #21 | |
| 1977 | Peter Gabriel | "Solsbury Hill" | UK #13 | |
| 1977 | Genesis | Spot the Pigeon | UK #14 | |
| 1978 | Genesis | "Follow You Follow Me"^{1} | SWI #6, UK #7, GER #8 | |
| 1980 | Peter Gabriel | "Games Without Frontiers" | UK #4, CAN #7 | |
| 1980 | Genesis | "Turn It on Again" | UK #8 | |
| 1980 | Peter Gabriel | "No Self Control" | UK #33 | |
| 1980 | Peter Gabriel | "Biko" | UK #38 | |
| 1981 | Genesis | "Abacab"^{1} | NOR #8, UK #9 | |
| 1981 | Genesis | "Keep It Dark" | UK #33 | |
| 1982 | Genesis | 3×3 | UK #10 | |
| 1982 | Malcolm McLaren and the World's Famous Supreme Team | "Buffalo Gals"^{1} | SWI #9, UK #9 | |
| 1983 | Malcolm McLaren and the Mclarenettes | "Soweto" | UK #32 | |
| 1983 | Malcolm McLaren and the Ebonettes | "Double Dutch" | UK #3, IRE #7, NZ #10 | |
| 1984 | Malcolm McLaren | "Madam Butterfly (Un bel di vedremo)" | IRE #10, UK #13 | |
| 1985 | Julian Lennon | "Too Late for Goodbyes"^{1} | IRE #5, UK #6 | |
| 1985 | Julian Lennon | "Say You're Wrong" | US #21 | |
| 1986 | Peter Gabriel | "Sledgehammer"^{2} | IRE #3, UK #4, NLD #6, GER #7, ITA #8 | |
| 1991 | Julian Lennon | "Saltwater"^{1} | IRE #5, UK #6 | |

1: On Atlantic Records in Canada, New Zealand and the US
2: On Geffen Records in Australia, Canada, New Zealand and the US

EP

== Compilation / sampler albums ==
| Year | Album |
|---|---|
| 1973 | Parlour Song Book – An Evening of Victorian Gems |
| 1973 | Music from Free Creek |
| 1973 | Lay Lady Lay |
| 1973 | Charisma Festival |
| 1973 | One More Chance |
| 1973 | The Golden Age of Comedy |
| 1973 | Charisma Disturbance |
| 1974 | Charisma Keyboards |
| 1974 | The Famous Charisma Label 5th Anniversary |
| 1975 | Beyond an Empty Dream (Songs for a Modern Church) |
| 1975 | Charisma Records October Releases |
| 1975 | Charisma Records September Releases |
| 1975 | Beyond an Empty Dream |
| 1976 | Summit Meeting |
| 1977 | Charisma Festival '77 |
| 1979 | Charisma Presentation |
| 1980 | Masterpieces |
| 1980 | Untitled |
| 1980 | The Charisma Repeat Performance |
| 1980 | Disco Promozionale |
| 1981 | We Are Most Amused: The Very Best of British Comedy |
| 1981 | Heat from the Street |
| 1983 | Songs for a Modern Church '83 |
| 1984 | Hip Hop – The Original and Best |

== See also ==
- Lists of record labels
