= Rod Clements =

British musician

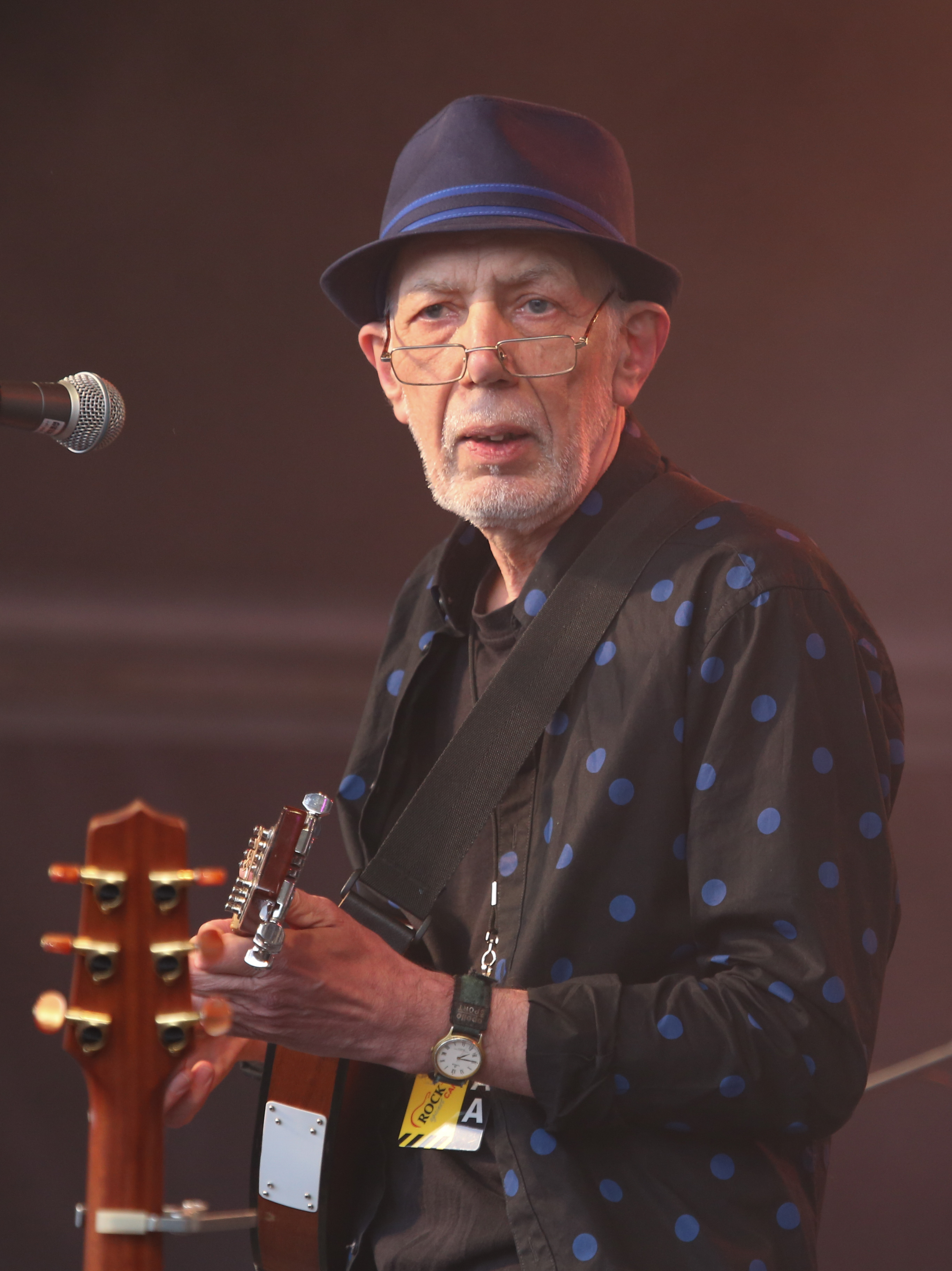
- Clements performing with Lindisfarne in 2015

Background information
- Born: Roderick Parry Clements; 17 November 1947 (age 78); North Shields, Northumberland, England
- Genres: Folk rock; roots; blues; Americana; folk; rock
- Occupation: Musician
- Instruments: Slide guitar; guitar; bass; mandolin; violin; vocals
- Member of: Lindisfarne
- Formerly of: Brethren; Downtown Faction; Jack the Lad; Pacamax; Pentangle; Rod Clements & The Ghosts of Electricity

Roderick Parry Clements (born 17 November 1947) is a British guitarist, singer-songwriter and multi-instrumentalist. He formed the folk-rock band Lindisfarne with Alan Hull in 1970, and wrote "Meet Me on the Corner", a UK Top 5 hit in March 1972, which won Clements an Ivor Novello Award. Lindisfarne broke up in 1973 and Clements became a founding member of Jack the Lad, also working with Ralph McTell and Bert Jansch. Lindisfarne reformed in 1977 and Clements continued to be part of the line-up until 2003. Rod rejoined Lindisfarne in 2015 and is currently touring and performing with the band.

== Early life ==
Clements was an only child. Although neither of his parents was especially active musically, his mother played the piano, and his father was a lover of classical music and encouraged his son to attend concerts. Clements attended The King's School, Tynemouth, after which, at the age of 12, he was sent to Durham School. He subsequently attended Durham University (St. Cuthbert's Society), graduating with a BA in ancient history and anthropology.

From an early age he had been able to pick up a tune and play it and his first inspiration to play the guitar came from hearing the hits of Duane Eddy, The Shadows and The Ventures. By 1965 he had formed an R&B group called Downtown Faction.

== Career ==
=== Lindisfarne ===
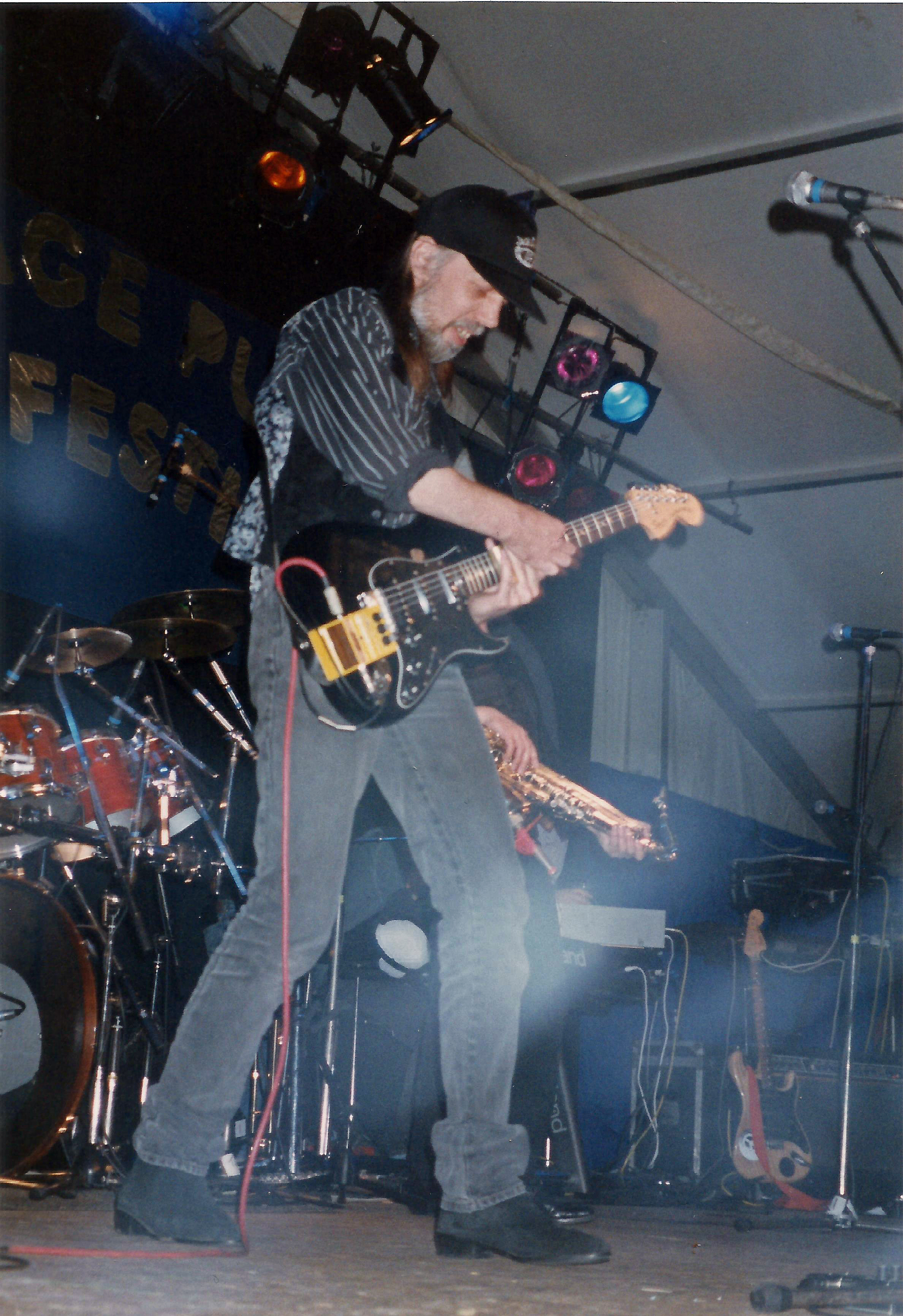
Rod Clements on stage with Lindisfarne in 1991

As a bass guitarist, Clements teamed up with local musicians in North Shields to form a blues band (also called the Downtown Faction). The band was later renamed Brethren, and became regular performers at folk clubs in the North East. Clements befriended a Newcastle singer/songwriter called Alan Hull, and formed the folk-rock band Lindisfarne with him and several members of Brethren in 1970. Although Hull was Lindisfarne's main songwriter, Clements provided the band with its first hit in "Meet Me on the Corner", a UK Top 5 hit in March 1972. Clements won a Certificate of Honour at the Ivor Novello Awards for the song.

Lindisfarne reformed in 1977 and Clements continued to be part of the line-up, contributing many songs to albums such as Back and Fourth, The News, Sleepless Nights and Dance Your Life Away. Following Alan Hull's death in 1995, Clements became the band's main songwriter; in partnership with producer and co-writer Nigel Stonier, he provided the bulk of material for Lindisfarne's two last albums, Here Comes The Neighbourhood (1998) and Promenade (2002). The band finally broke up following a concert in Newcastle Opera House in November 2003.

Clements' main role in Lindisfarne was that of bassist until 1990, when he moved to slide guitar and mandolin; his former role was filled thereafter by Steve Cunningham and latterly Ian Thomson. Clements also played violin from time to time, most notably in the instrumental break of "Fog on the Tyne", both on stage and on disc.

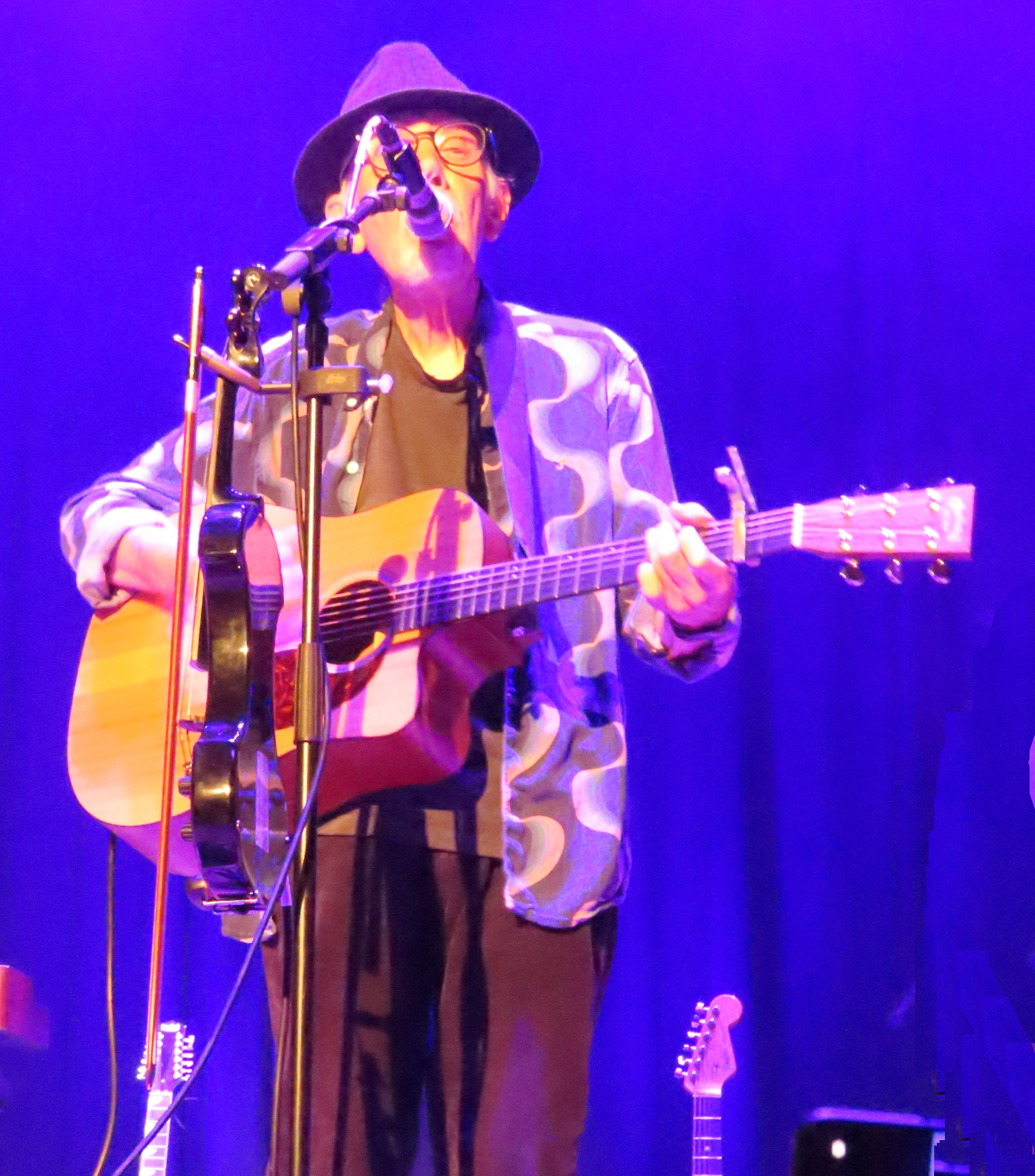
Clements performing with Lindisfarne in 2023

Clements re-joined Lindisfarne in 2015, replacing co-founder Ray Jackson who then retired from performing with the band. Clements now performs vocals, acoustic & electric guitar, slide guitar, mandolin and violin with Lindisfarne.

=== Jack the Lad and other work ===
Lindisfarne broke up in 1973 and Clements became a founding member of Jack the Lad, which also included two other former Lindisfarne members, on whose debut album It's Jack The Lad he played a significant role as multi-instrumentalist and songwriter. In 1974 he played bass on Ralph McTell's "Streets of London", which topped the UK charts at Christmas that year. Clements went on to tour and record several albums with McTell. He also worked with Bert Jansch, touring Britain and Europe and working as producer on Jansch's comeback album A Rare Conundrum. Clements and Jansch also recorded a Woody Guthrie tribute album, Woody Lives!, and the jointly-credited Leather Launderette.

Clements has also toured and recorded with Rab Noakes and Michael Chapman and performed on albums by Peter Hammill, Wizz Jones and Kathryn Tickell amongst others. He has also supplied bass, dobro, and guitar parts to albums by singer/songwriter Thea Gilmore, who has herself appeared on Clements' solo albums.

Clements released the album One Track Mind in 1994, and followed this with Stamping Ground in 2000, having written or co-written each of the tracks. Another album, Odd Man Out, was released in 2006. It was produced by Nigel Stonier. Spring 2008 saw the reissue with bonus tracks of One Track Mind. He continues to tour regularly, performing a mixture of Lindisfarne and solo songs.

Songs written by Clements have been covered by artists including Melanie Safka and Joe Brown; and a Clements/Stonier composition, "Can't Do Right For Doing Wrong", was a British Top 30 hit for Erin Rocha at Christmas 2003.

== Discography ==
Solo albums

- One Track Mind (1994)
- Stamping Ground (2000)
- Live Ghosts (2004)
- Odd Man Out (2006)
- One Track Mind 2008 (2008) – with bonus tracks

Lindisfarne albums with Clements

- Nicely Out of Tune (1970)
- Fog on the Tyne (1971)
- Dingly Dell (1972)
- Back And Fourth (1978)
- The News (1979)
- Sleepless Nights (1982)
- Dance Your Life Away (1986)
- Amigos (1989)
- Elvis Lives on the Moon (1993)
- Blues from the Bothy (EP) (1997)
- Here Comes the Neighbourhood (1998)
- Promenade (2002)

Jack the Lad

- It's Jack the Lad (1973)

with Bert Jansch

- "In the Bleak Midwinter" (single) (1974)
- A Rare Conundrum (1976)

Bert Jansch & Rod Clements

- Leather Launderette (1988)

with Ralph McTell

- "Streets of London" (single) (1974)
- Streets (album) (1975)
- Right Side Up (1976)
- Songs from Alphabet Zoo (1983)

with Prelude

- Owl Creek Incident (1975)

with Dando Shaft

- Kingdom (1977)

with Michael Chapman

- The Man Who Hated Mornings (1977)
- Looking for Eleven (1980)
- Plaindealer (2005)

with Jim Rafferty

- Don't Talk Back (1978)

with Rab Noakes

- Rab Noakes (1980)
- Under the Rain (1983)
- Throwing Shapes (Rab Noakes & The Varaflames) (2000)

with Thea Gilmore

- The Lipstick Conspiracies (2000)
- Songs from the Gutter (2002)

with Nigel Stonier

- Golden Coins (1993)
- Brimstone & Blue (2002)

with Peter Hammill

- Fool's Mate (1971)

with Wizz Jones

- Happiness Was Free (1976)

with Kathryn Tickell

- Borderlands (1986)

with Pentangle

- So Early in the Spring (1989)

with Mark Knopfler

- Newport Mount Rag (recorded 1974)

Various artists

- Woody Lives! (Woody Guthrie tribute album) (1987)
- People on the Highway (Bert Jansch tribute album) (2000)
