= Ray Laidlaw =

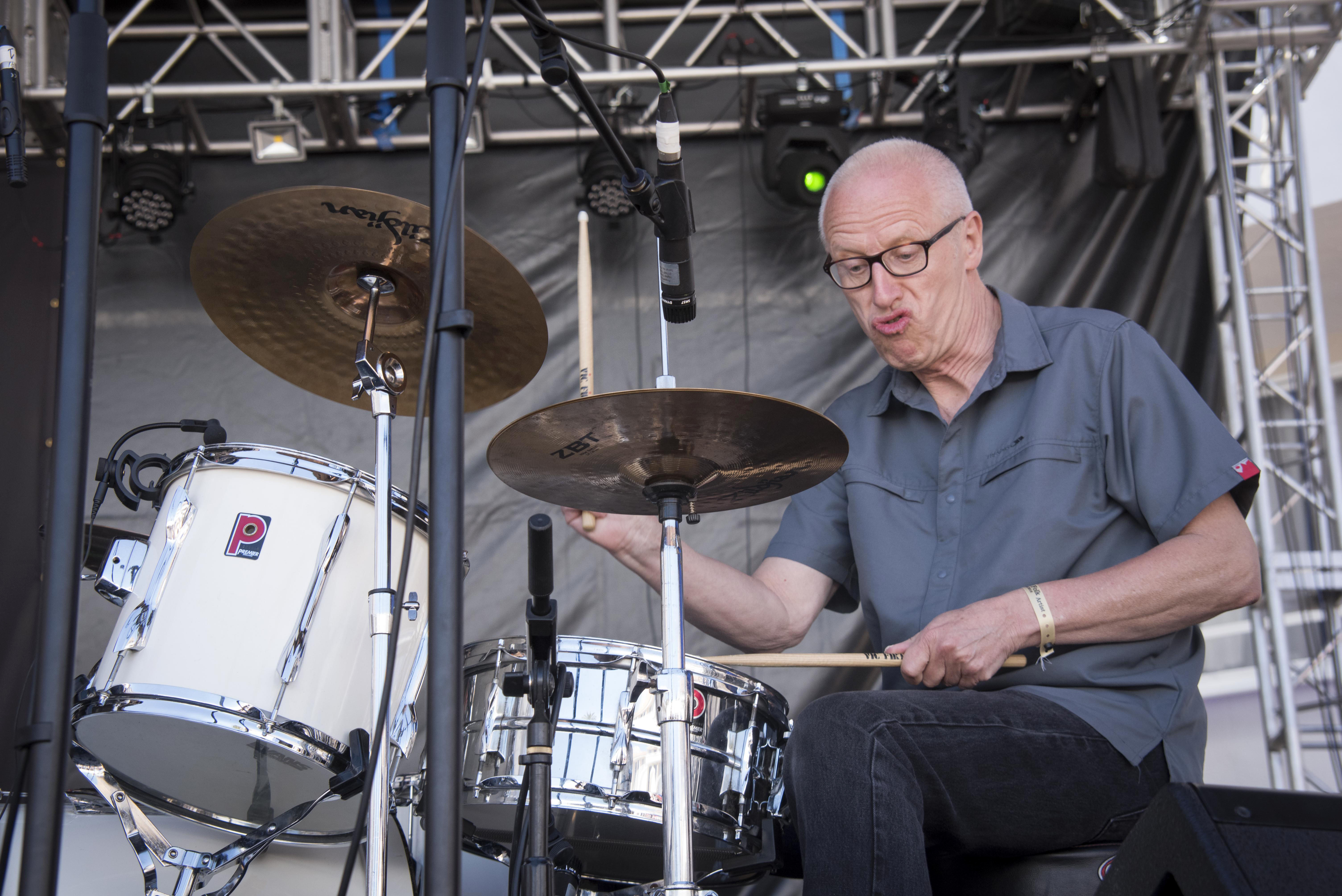
- Laidlaw on stage in 2016

Background information
- Born: 28 May 1948 (age 77); Tyneside, England
- Genres: Folk
- Instrument: Drums
- Years active: 1968–present
- Formerly of: Lindisfarne, Jack the Lad

Ray Laidlaw (born 28 May 1948) is a British drummer. He is best known for being a member of Lindisfarne from 1968 to 2003. He plays in The Lindisfarne Story, a tribute band to the group with ex-member Billy Mitchell.

== Early life ==
Laidlaw was born in Tyneside in 1948. Ray's father worked in the ship yards. On his thirteenth birthday, his grandad gifted him his first drum kit.

== Career ==
Laidlaw formed his first band, The Aristocrats with Simon Cowe, who lived down the road from him (around a five minute walk according to Ray), after one of Ray's cousins began dating Simon's brother, and performed covers of folk and skiffle songs.

Laidlaw first met Alan Hull in 1964 when Hull was in the band "The Chosen Few". Laidlaw, Cowe and Hull formed Lindisfarne (at first called Brethren) in 1968 with Hull Ray Jackson (vocals, mandolin, harmonica) and Rod Clements (bass guitar, violin). The band had two UK top 5 hits in 1971, "Lady Eleanor" (UK #3) and "Meet me on the Corner" (UK #5). During a mimed performance of "Meet Me on the Corner" in 1971 on Top of the Pops, Laidlaw mimed to his drum track with a large bass fish instead of a drum stick, he later said in 2019 of the performance: "It was to be remembered and journalists are still asking about it, so it worked".

In 1973, Laidlaw, Crowe, and Clements all left the band to form Jack the Lad, a group made to perform more traditionally folk group instead of Lindisfarne's Progressive folk sound. The band sometimes toured with Lindisfarne. Laidlaw left the band a few months before they split up and joined another group, Radiator for a year.

In 1978, the original five members of Lindisfarne reformed and had another top ten hit, "Run For Home" (UK #10). The band continued to tour until 2003, when they played their last gig. Laidlaw is now a semi-retired drummer and works full-time as an event producer. He helps run the Sunday for Sammy charity gigs, that was initially set up by Tim Healy and Jimmy Nail in memory of Healy's co-star Sammy Johnson.

Laidlaw now tours in The Lindisfarne Story, with Jack the Lad member Billy Mitchell, who also joined Lindisfarne after Hull's death in 1995.

In 2015, Laidlaw donated money to a fund for a comedy competition called The Phil Richardson Comedy Writing Award, named after a Tyneside singer/comedian who died in 2013.

== Personal life ==
Laidlaw lives in Tynemouth with his wife Lesley Ann. They have a son, who lives in California. He enjoys cycling.
