= Ray Jackson (musician) =

British musician

- Born: Lindsay Raymond Jackson; 12 December 1948 (age 77); Wallsend, England
- Genre: Folk
- Instruments: Vocals; guitar; mandolin; harmonica
- Years active: 1968–1990, 2013–2015
- Formerly of: Lindisfarne

Lindsay Raymond "Ray" Jackson (born 12 December 1948, Wallsend, Northumberland) is a retired English singer-songwriter, who played a variety of instruments including the mandolin and harmonica. He was a member and also joint lead vocalist (with Alan Hull) of the folk-rock group Lindisfarne from their original formation in 1970 until his departure in 1990.

== Early life ==
After leaving school he studied graphics at Newcastle College of Art and Industrial Design, where he met Ray Laidlaw.

== Career ==
=== Lindisfarne: 1968–1990, 2013–2015 ===
Jackson joined Lindisfarne in 1968. Also in the band were vocalist/keyboardist Alan Hull, guitarist Simon Cowe, bassist Rod Clements, and Jackson's friend from Art college, Ray Laidlaw. As Jackson and Laidlaw shared the same forename, Jackson was generally known in the group as "Jacka". He designed the group's logo and the sleeve of their debut album Nicely Out of Tune.

In Lindisfarne, Jackson generally took lead vocals on the songs written by bassist and fiddle player Rod Clements, including "Meet Me on the Corner", their first hit single. He stayed with the group in 1973 when three of the five original members left to form Jack the Lad. He designed the sleeve for Jack the Lad's third album Rough Diamonds, and played harmonica on the record. He also played mandolin on Chris de Burgh's debut album Far Beyond These Castle Walls.

Lindisfarne initially disbanded in 1975. Also in 1975, he formed Harcourt's Heroes with singer-guitarist Charlie Harcourt, with whom he had formed a songwriting partnership while both were members of Lindisfarne between 1973 and 1975. However, the original Lindisfarne line-up reunited for sell-out Christmas concerts at Newcastle City Hall in 1976 and repeated this in 1977. In early 1978 they decided to get back together for good, and by that summer their first single "Run For Home" was not only a Top 10 hit in the UK but also gave them their long-awaited breakthrough into the US Top 40, reaching No. 33. The album it was taken from, Back and Fourth, also reached the UK top 25. Apart from the earlier group credited 'B' side "Scotch Mist", Back and Fourth saw Jackson receive his first writing credits for two songs written with Charlie Harcourt, "Warm Feeling" and "King's Cross Blues". The following album "The News", featured their composition "This Has Got To End" while their song "Winning The Game" was featured on "Sleepless Nights".

By the mid-1980s, Lindisfarne were no longer enjoying the success of former years. After a disagreement between Jackson and the band around the time Lindisfarne recorded a re-worked version of "Fog on the Tyne" with footballer Paul Gascoigne—in which Jackson took part neither in the recording nor in the promotional video—Jackson left the band, and retired from music all together. According to Jackson, "The band’s recording career was beginning to wane and the idea was presented to me as a way of finding our way back into the charts. I felt uncomfortable right from the start of this process and considered it ill judged. In my opinion it was totally at odds with our solid reputation, built over the previous two decades of performing and writing. I felt we were selling out; the rest of the band disagreed." The song would succeed, peaking at number two in the UK charts.

Jackson did not appear with Lindisfarne again for 15 years, until he appeared onstage to rapturous applause at a memorial concert at Newcastle City Hall at a memorial concert in November 2005, organised to celebrate the life and music of Alan Hull.

In February 2013, in support of Newcastle City Hall which was then under threat of closure, Jackson announced he would return to the famous venue for a Christmas show for the first time in 23 years. Tickets for Ray Jackson's Lindisfarne Christmas Show sold out in six hours. Second and third shows were added for 20/22 December 2013 which also sold out. Jackson announced the permanent return of Lindisfarne after 10 years. The band was composed of five former members of Lindisfarne, plus Roxy Music drummer Paul Thompson. According to Jackson, he had turned down other opportunities to make a new Lindisfarne within the past decade, but only agreed to reform the group then as it was "for such a worthy cause". The newly formed lineup was also endorsed by Pat Hull, Alan Hull's widow.

On 12 January 2015, the 'Lindisfarne Official' Facebook page posted the following announcement: "It is with regret that we have to announce Ray Jackson's retirement from Lindisfarne. Although his decision has come as a surprise to us, it was always Jacka's intention to hand things over at some point and ensure the great name of Lindisfarne continues to keep the songs and spirit alive well into the future. The band intend to honour all diary commitments through 2015 and will be announcing more details very soon."

Original bassist Rod Clements returned as new lead vocalist/guitarist. In an interview shortly after his departure, Jackson said: "It was never a long-term plan and I wish the rest of the band all the best in the future."

=== Solo career: 1975–1980 ===
When Lindisfarne disbanded in 1975, Jackson embarked on a solo career with EMI. The contract, signed in October 1975, included a clause that the company would release three singles within the first year. Only one, "Take Some Time", was issued; it sold around 300 copies and no further releases were forthcoming. Jackson and McKay later sued EMI for ruining his solo career, on the grounds that they had failed to promote the record properly or record the promised three singles. EMI's defence was based on their belief that musical material provided by Jackson "was not satisfactory and would have been a commercial failure". The case came to court in March 1985; the judge ruled that according to the contract, Jackson was not obliged to provide his own material. Jackson and McKay were awarded damages and costs against the company to a total of £23,304.

Jackson also recorded a solo album, In The Night, released in 1980, produced by Hugh Murphy, which included material co-written by him and Harcourt, as well as songs such as "In the Midnight Hour", "Little Town Flirt", and the Stealers Wheel hit "Everything Will Turn Out Fine". "Hugh Murphy and I were asked to compromise and record a number of new songs from other sources to make it sound more commercial to the emerging market, leaving out some of the self-penned songs", he said. "Regardless of this, I had a great time making the album and some great musicians played on it with me. Today, I feel that some of the performances and the songs are old-fashioned sounding. However, there are still a few which stand the test of time quite well."

=== "Maggie May" lawsuit: 2003 ===
Alongside his activities in Lindisfarne, he also played mandolin on Sir Rod Stewart's solo albums Every Picture Tells a Story (1971), Never a Dull Moment (1972), and Smiler (1974). His playing can be heard particularly on the songs "Maggie May", "Mandolin Wind" and "Farewell". When Jackson played the mandolin on Rod Stewart's "Maggie May", he was not credited by name on the sleeve of Every Picture Tells a Story, only by a reference: "The mandolin was played by the mandolin player in Lindisfarne. The name slips my mind."

Jackson threatened legal action against Stewart in 2003, claiming that he should have been credited as co-composer of "Maggie May" alongside Stewart and guitarist Martin Quittenton for writing the musical "hook" of the song. Stewart had called Jackson in to play on "Mandolin Wind", and was so pleased at the results that he asked the musician if he had any ideas for the unfinished "Maggie May". Jackson claimed that he wrote the famous and instantly recognisable mandolin hook. In a statement he said, "I am convinced that my contribution to 'Maggie May,' which occurred in the early stages of my career when I was just becoming famous for my work with Lindisfarne, was essential to the success of the record. Furthermore, a writing credit would have given me a writing status which would have encouraged my writing efforts and could well have opened doors for me." His manager Barry McKay said that Jackson was asked to write something in the studio for the then unfinished record and wrote the hook. At the time, he had no idea he would be entitled to part-ownership as joint composer, and was merely paid a £15 session fee. A spokesman for Stewart dismissed his claim as "ridiculous".

=== Later years ===
After Jackson initially retired from music in 1990, he joined a sports marketing agency as promotional manager, working on sports sponsorships.

Later, he decided to resume his creative and artistic interests by opening an art studio and picture framing business at Witney, Oxfordshire. He is particularly known for his skilled paintings of period buses in their correct street settings with perfect detail. In recent years Jackson formed the band Gathering – Legends of Folk Rock with Jerry Donahue, Clive Bunker, Rick Kemp, Doug Morter and Kristina Donahue.

As of 2026, Jackson was playing the a local band called SilverBlues.

== Personal life ==
As of 2003, Jackson was living in Oxfordshire.

In 2026, Jackson made headlines when he bought a rare Northfield mandolin from Missouri from a charity shop an Oxfam charity shop in Abingdon-on-Thames for £2,800. He later returned to the shop to perform the "Maggie May" solo for customers. Jackson is a mandolin collector, and currently owns around eight mandolins, as well as three mandolas.
