= Lindisfarne (band) =

English folk rock band

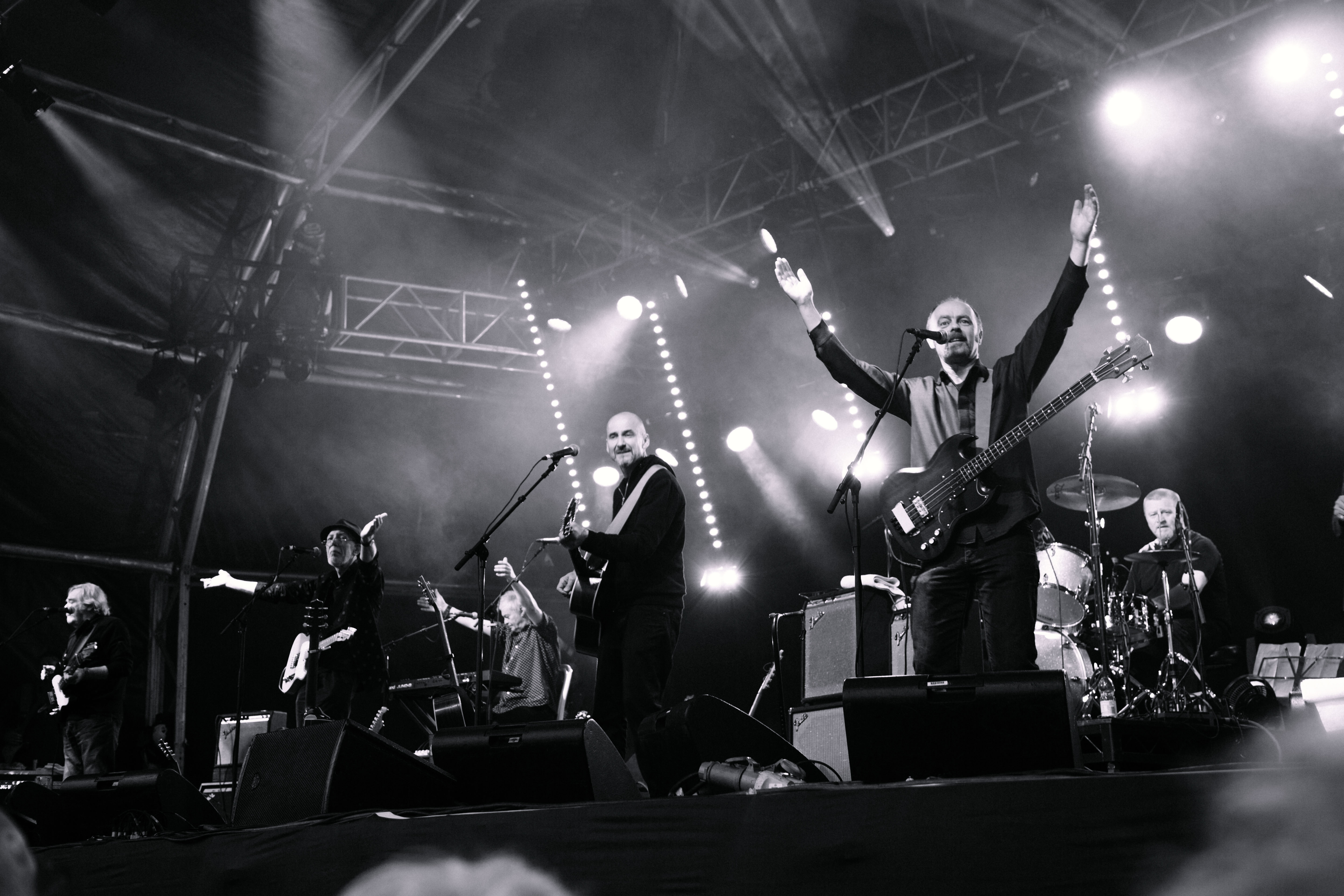
- Lindisfarne performing at Concert at the Kings, 2015

Background information
- Also known as: Brethren (1968); Lindisfarne Acoustic (2002–2004); Ray Jackson's Lindisfarne (2013–2014)
- Origin: Newcastle upon Tyne, England
- Genre: Folk rock
- Years active: 1968–1975; 1976; 1978–2004; 2013–present
- Labels: Charisma; Elektra; Mercury; Atco; LMP, Subterranean Records; Hangover; River City; Stylus; Black Crow; Best/RCA; Essential; Grapevine
- Spinoffs: Jack the Lad; Radiator; The Ghosts of Electricity, Alan Hull Songbook/ downtown raction
- Members: Rod Clements; Steve Daggett; Steve Cunningham; Neil Harland; Dave Hull-Denholm; Paul Smith
- Past members: Ray Jackson; Ray Laidlaw; Charlie Harcourt; Simon Cowe; Alan Hull; Kenny Craddock; Tommy Duffy; Paul Nichols; Marty Craggs; Billy Mitchell; Paul Thompson; Ian Thomson
- Website: www.lindisfarne.com

Lindisfarne are an English folk rock band from Newcastle upon Tyne established in 1968 (originally called Brethren). The original line-up comprised Alan Hull (vocals, guitar, keyboards), Ray Jackson (vocals, mandolin, harmonica), Simon Cowe (guitar, mandolin, banjo, keyboards), Rod Clements (bass guitar, violin) and Ray Laidlaw (drums).

They are best known for the albums Nicely Out of Tune (1970), Fog on the Tyne (1971) (which became the biggest selling UK album in 1972), Dingly Dell (1972) and Back and Fourth (1978), and for the success of songs such as "Meet Me on the Corner", "Lady Eleanor", "Run for Home", "Fog on the Tyne" and "We Can Swing Together".

== History ==
=== Early days ===
The group began as The Downtown Faction, led by Rod Clements, then changed their name to Brethren. In 1968, they were joined by Alan Hull and became Lindisfarne, after the small island, Lindisfarne, off the coast of Northumberland.

=== Charisma records ===
In 1970, Tony Stratton Smith signed them to Charisma Records and their debut album Nicely Out of Tune was released that year. This album defined their mixture of bright harmony and up-tempo folk rock. Neither single released from the album, "Clear White Light" or "Lady Eleanor", charted; nor did the album itself at first. However, the band obtained a strong following from its popular live concerts and built a reputation as one of the top festival bands.

Their second album Fog on the Tyne (1971) produced by Bob Johnston, began their commercial success. This album reached No. 1 in the UK Albums Chart the following year. The extracted single "Meet Me on the Corner", composed by Clements and sung by Jackson, reached No. 5 in the UK Singles Chart and remains the only Lindisfarne song to win an Ivor Novello Award. The performance of this song on BBC TV's Top of the Pops featured Laidlaw striking a large bass drum with a rubber fish.

"Lady Eleanor" was reissued as a follow-up to "Meet Me on the Corner" and reached No. 3 in the UK and No. 82 in the US. The debut album Nicely Out of Tune belatedly made the UK Albums Chart Top 10 and the band began to attract a larger media following, with some calling Hull the greatest songwriter since Bob Dylan. The band were referred to as the "1970s Beatles".

=== Dingly Dell and change of line-up ===
In 1972, they recorded their third album, Dingly Dell, but the band were unhappy with the initial production and remixed it themselves. It was released in September 1972 and entered the Top 10 in the first week, receiving lukewarm reviews. The ecologically themed single "All Fall Down" was a UK Singles Chart No. 34 hit and the second single "Court in the Act" failed completely.

Internal tensions surfaced during a disappointing tour of Australia in early 1973. Hull initially considered leaving the band, but was persuaded to reconsider. It was agreed that he and Jackson would keep the group name while Cowe, Clements and Laidlaw left to form their own outfit Jack the Lad. They were replaced by Tommy Duffy (bass guitar), Kenny Craddock (keyboards), Charlie Harcourt (guitar) and Paul Nichols (drums). The new line-up lacked the appeal of the original and with Hull also pursuing a solo career, the band's next two albums Roll on Ruby and Happy Daze and the subsequent singles failed to chart and they disbanded in 1975. Nichols subsequently joined the hard rock supergroup Widowmaker.

=== Mercury Records period ===
The original line-up of Alan Hull, Ray Jackson, Ray Laidlaw, Rod Clements and Simon Cowe reformed in 1976 to perform a one-off gig but due to demand for tickets two other concerts were quickly added in Newcastle City Hall before they returned to their other projects. The Newcastle City Hall reunion was so acclaimed that the band repeated it a year later which also were recorded for the double live album 'Magic in the Air' and decided to get back together on a permanent basis in early 1978, Jack the Lad having disbanded after none of their singles or albums on two different labels made the charts. They continued to perform at Newcastle City Hall every Christmas for many years, a total of 132 shows at the venue overall. They gained a new record deal with Mercury Records and returned to the charts in 1978 with the UK chart top 10 hit "Run For Home", an autobiographical song about the rigours of touring and relief at returning home. The song also gave them a hit in various countries, and was their first top 40 US singles chart hit with Atco Records, reaching No. 33. The album Back and Fourth moved into the Top 30 of the UK Albums Chart; however, subsequent singles taken from the album which included "Juke Box Gypsy" and "Warm Feeling" failed to sustain their newly found success. The Australian tour of early 1979 was cancelled after their show in Wellington, New Zealand, when the promoter vanished with their fee and air tickets home. The next album The News (1979) and the singles from it were commercial failures, and the band lost their record deal. In 1980, they supported The Beach Boys at the Knebworth Festival.

1980s

Over the following decade, the original quintet continued to release albums. They formed their own company Lindisfarne Musical Productions and recorded singles such as the electric, rock-oriented "Friday Girl" and the humorous song "I Must Stop Going To Parties" in the early 1980s, as well as the album Sleepless Nights. In 1984, they supported Bob Dylan and Santana at St James' Park. Saxophonist, flautist and vocalist Marty Craggs joined shortly afterwards, making the band a sextet. During the second half of the 1980s, they played annual Christmas tours and released Dance Your Life Away (1986) and C'mon Everybody (1987) – the latter made up of covers of old rock and roll standards and reworkings of some of the band's most popular songs. Keyboardist Steve Daggett, formerly of new wave band Stiletto, produced both these albums and augmented the onstage line-up for two tours. Another album, Amigos, was released in 1989.

1990s

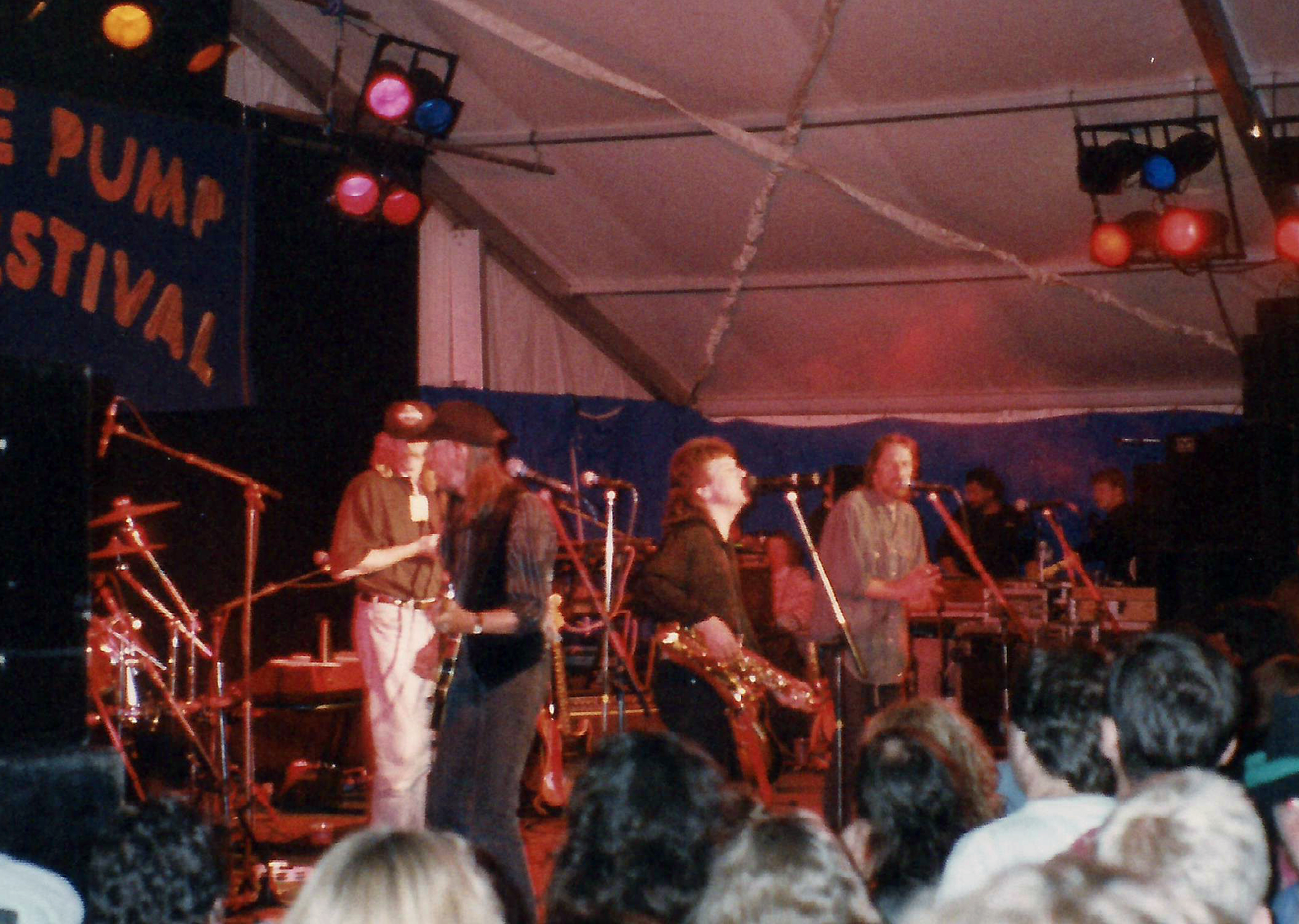
Lindisfarne at a festival in 1991

In 1990, Lindisfarne introduced themselves to a younger generation with the duet "Fog on the Tyne Revisited", accompanied by footballer Paul Gascoigne, which reached No. 2 in the UK singles chart. Around this time, Jackson left the band and Craggs took over his lead vocals, adding piano accordion and tin whistle, as the band gradually rediscovered its acoustic roots. Clements started to play slide guitar and mandolin, his former role as bassist being filled by Steve Cunningham and, later, Ian Thomson. Hull's son-in-law Dave Hull-Denholm joined in 1994 to replace Cowe, who left shortly after the recording of the album Elvis Lives on the Moon and emigrated to Toronto, Canada, where he ran a brewery. He rejoined them briefly on stage for occasional dates on a subsequent American tour. He died in September 2015 from oesophageal cancer.

=== Death of Hull and 2nd break-up ===
Alan Hull died on 17 November 1995, but the surviving members continued to use the name. With former Jack The Lad frontman Billy Mitchell in Hull's place, the band released two more studio albums, Here Comes The Neighbourhood (1997) and Promenade (2002). A number of live albums were also released. Craggs quit in 2000, after which Mitchell took over Jackson's and Craggs' lead vocals and used the harmonica on a harness.

Lindisfarne finally broke up in May 2004, with the full line-up performing a final concert on 1 November 2003 at the Newcastle Opera House. The final line-up as a band consisted of Dave Hull-Denholm, Billy Mitchell, Rod Clements, Ian Thomson and Ray Laidlaw. Clements, Hull-Denholm, and Mitchell continued to tour under the name Lindisfarne Acoustic until May 2004 (the trio having played under this name occasionally since 2002), whilst Clements, Hull-Denholm and Thomson formed The Ghosts of Electricity.

=== Alan Hull memorial concert and plaque ===
On 19 November 2005, the friends and colleagues of Alan Hull held a memorial concert at Newcastle City Hall and included Alan Clark, Brendan Healy, Tim Healy, Ian McCallum, The Motorettes, Jimmy Nail, Tom Pickard, Prelude, Paul Smith and Kathryn Tickell. Proceeds from the concert were donated to The North East Young Musicians Fund. The Alan Hull Award for young musicians in the North East was set up a year later in response to the success of the concert.

On 19 July 2012, following a public campaign led by Lindisfarne's former manager from the 1970s, Barry McKay, an Alan Hull memorial plaque was unveiled on the front of Newcastle City Hall, at a ceremony attended by hundreds of fans and filmed by Sky TV and Tyne Tees Television.

=== The Lindisfarne Story touring band ===
In mid 2012, Ray Laidlaw, Billy Mitchell and The Billy Mitchell Band toured 'The Lindisfarne Story', consisting of the band's music and stories from Lindisfarne's history. This was followed by a concert at Newcastle City Hall in June 2013.

In February 2013, in support of Newcastle City Hall which was then under threat of closure, Ray Jackson announced he would return to the iconic venue for a Christmas show for the first time in 23 years. Tickets for Ray Jackson's Lindisfarne Christmas Show sold out in six hours. A second show was added for 22 December 2013, which also sold out.

=== Ray Jackson's Lindisfarne: 2013–2015 ===
In June 2013, Ray Jackson announced the line-up of what is Ray Jackson's Lindisfarne, comprising himself, Daggett, Harcourt, Hull-Denholm, and Thomson, along with new recruit Paul Thompson (of Roxy Music) on drums. All of the band members hail from the Newcastle area. Jackson formed this lineup by a request in 2012, as there was a campaign going on at the time to stop the closure of Newcastle City Hall. Jackson explained in 2015 that in the years since the bands original 2003 disbandment, he had already turned down over opportunities to reform Lindisfarne, but chose only to do it on this occasion as it was "for such a worthy cause". Ray Jackson's Lindisfarne performed two sold-out Christmas gigs at the City Hall, and at the same time, a third Newcastle City Hall 2013 Christmas Show was announced, which also sold out.

=== Lindisfarne: 2015–present ===
On 12 January 2015, it was announced that Ray Jackson had retired from the band. The remaining members later announced that Rod Clements had rejoined the band in Jackson's place. In a 2015 interview, Jackson explained the reasoning behind his retiring, saying: "It was never a long-term plan and I wish the rest of the band all the best in the future."

On 30 July 2018, Lindisfarne announced the retirement of Charlie Harcourt from the band due to health issues; Rod Clements added that Lindisfarne would continue as a five-piece. Harcourt died on 28 July 2020.

In 2021, Paul Thompson retired from the band and was replaced by Paul Smith on drums.

Ian Thomson retired in 2025, and was replaced by Steve Cunningham, who preceded Thomson from 1989 to 1995.

== Members ==
=== Current members ===
Image	Name	Years active	Instruments	Release contributions
	Rod Clements	1968–1973; 1976; 1978–2004; 2015–present	bass guitar; violin; guitar; slide guitar; mandolin; keyboards; lead and backing vocals	all releases
	Steve Daggett	(touring member 1986–1987)2013–present	vocals; keyboards; acoustic guitar; harmonica	Real Live Lindisfarne (2018)
	Steve Cunningham	1989–1995; 2025–present	bass guitar; recording engineer; producer	Amigos (1989); Live (1993); Elvis Lives on the Moon (1993)
	Dave Hull-Denholm	1994–2003; 2013–present	guitars; keyboards; harmonica; lead and backing vocals	Another Fine Mess (1995); Here Comes the Neighbourhood (1998); Untapped And Acoustic (1997); The Cropredy Concert (1997); Promenade (2002); Real Live Lindisfarne (2018)
	Paul Smith	2021–present	drums	none to date

=== Former members ===
Image	Name	Years active	Instruments	Release contributions
	Ray Jackson	1968–1975; 1976; 1978–1990; 2013–2015	vocals; mandolin; harmonica	all releases from Nicely Out of Tune (1970) to Live (1993); Lindisfarne Live At The Cambridge Folk Festival (1999); The River Sessions (2004)
	Ray Laidlaw	1968–1973; 1976; 1978–2003	drums	all releases, except Roll On, Ruby (1973), Happy Daze (1974) and Real Live Lindisfarne (2018); Lindisfarne Live At The Cambridge Folk Festival (1999); The River Sessions (2004)
	Simon Cowe	1968–1973; 1976; 1978–1994 (died 2015)	guitar; mandolin; banjo; keyboards; backing vocals	all release from Nicely Out of Tune (1970) to Elvis Lives on the Moon (1993), except Roll On, Ruby (1973) and Happy Daze (1974); Lindisfarne Live At The Cambridge Folk Festival (1999); The River Sessions (2004)
	Alan Hull	1968–1975; 1976; 1978–1995 (died 1995)	vocals; guitar; keyboards	all releases from Nicely Out of Tune (1970) to Another Fine Mess (1995); Lindisfarne Live At The Cambridge Folk Festival (1999); The River Sessions (2004)
	Charlie Harcourt	1973–1975; 2013–2017 (died 2020)	guitar; backing vocals	Roll On, Ruby (1973); Happy Daze (1974); Real Live Lindisfarne (2018)
	Kenny Craddock	1973–1975 (died 2002)	keyboards; guitar; backing vocals	Roll On, Ruby (1973); Happy Daze (1974); Elvis Lives on the Moon (1993)
	Tommy Duffy	1973–1975	bass guitar; backing vocals	Roll On, Ruby (1973); Happy Daze (1974)
	Paul Nichols	1973–1975	drums	Roll On, Ruby (1973); Happy Daze (1974)
	Marty Craggs	1984–2000	saxophone; flute; accordion; tin whistle; vocals	all releases from Dance Your Life Away (1986) to Lindisfarne Live At The Cambridge Folk Festival (1999)
	Ian Thomson	1994–2003; 2013–2025	bass guitar; backing vocals	Another Fine Mess (1995); Here Comes the Neighbourhood (1998); Untapped And Acoustic (1997); The Cropredy Concert (1997); Promenade (2002); Real Live Lindisfarne (2018)
	Billy Mitchell	1995–2004	vocals; guitar; mandolin; banjo; keyboards	Untapped And Acoustic (1997); The Cropredy Concert (1997); Here Comes the Neighbourhood (1998); Promenade (2002)
	Paul Thompson	2013–2021	drums	Real Live Lindisfarne (2018)
	Tom Leary	2013–2015	fiddle; backing vocals	Real Live Lindisfarne (2018)

=== Lineups ===
1968 (Brethren)	1968–1973	1973–1975	1975–1976
Ray Jackson – vocals, mandolin, harmonica; Simon Cowe – guitar, mandolin, banjo, backing vocals; Rod Clements – bass guitar, violin, backing vocals; Ray Laidlaw – drums	Ray Jackson – vocals, mandolin, harmonica; Simon Cowe – guitar, mandolin, banjo, backing vocals; Rod Clements – bass guitar, violin, keyboards, guitar, backing vocals; Ray Laidlaw – drums; Alan Hull – vocals, guitar, keyboards	Ray Jackson – vocals, mandolin, harmonica; Alan Hull – vocals, guitar, keyboards; Kenny Craddock – keyboards, guitar, backing vocals; Tommy Duffy – bass guitar, backing vocals; Charlie Harcourt – guitar; Paul Nichols – drums	Disbanded
1976	1976–1978	1978–1984	1984–1990
Ray Jackson – vocals, mandolin, harmonica; Alan Hull – vocals, guitar, keyboards; Rod Clements – bass guitar, violin, backing vocals; Simon Cowe – guitar, mandolin, banjo, keyboards, backing vocals; Ray Laidlaw – drums	Disbanded	Ray Jackson – vocals, mandolin, harmonica; Alan Hull – vocals, guitar, keyboards; Rod Clements – bass guitar, violin, guitar, backing vocals; Simon Cowe – guitar, mandolin, banjo, keyboards, backing vocals; Ray Laidlaw – drums	Ray Jackson – vocals, mandolin, harmonica; Alan Hull – vocals, guitar, keyboards; Rod Clements – bass guitar, violin, guitar, backing vocals; Simon Cowe – guitar, mandolin, banjo, keyboards, backing vocals; Ray Laidlaw – drums; Marty Craggs – saxophone, flute, vocals; Touring personnel: Steve Daggett – keyboards (1986–1987)
1990–1994	1994	1994–1995	1995–2000
Alan Hull – vocals, guitar, keyboards; Rod Clements – slide guitar, mandolin, guitar; Ray Jackson – vocals, mandolin, harmonica, backing vocals, additional bass; Simon Cowe – guitar, mandolin, banjo, keyboards, backing vocals; Ray Laidlaw – drums; Marty Craggs – tenor & alto saxes, accordion, tin whistle, vocals; Steve Cunningham – bass guitar, recording engineer, producer	Alan Hull – vocals, guitar, keyboards; Rod Clements – slide guitar, mandolin, guitar, backing vocals; Simon Cowe – guitar, mandolin, banjo, keyboards, backing vocals; Ray Laidlaw – drums; Marty Craggs – tenor & alto saxes, accordion, tin whistle, vocals; Ian Thomson – bass guitar, backing vocals	Alan Hull – vocals, guitar, keyboards; Rod Clements – slide guitar, mandolin, guitar, violin, backing vocals; Ray Laidlaw – drums; Marty Craggs – tenor & alto saxes, accordion, tin whistle, vocals; Ian Thomson – bass guitar, backing vocals; Dave Hull-Denholm – guitar, keyboards, vocals	Rod Clements – slide guitar, mandolin, guitar, violin, backing vocals; Ray Laidlaw – drums; Marty Craggs – tenor & alto saxes, accordion, tin whistle, vocals; Ian Thomson – bass guitar, backing vocals; Dave Hull-Denholm – guitar, keyboards, vocals; Billy Mitchell – vocals, guitar, mandolin, banjo, keyboards
2000–2003	2003–2004 (Lindisfarne Acoustic)	2004–2013	2013–2014
Rod Clements – slide guitar, mandolin, guitar, violin, backing vocals; Ray Laidlaw – drums; Ian Thomson – bass guitar, backing vocals; Dave Hull-Denholm – guitar, keyboards, vocals; Billy Mitchell – vocals, guitar, mandolin, banjo, keyboards	Rod Clements – slide guitar, mandolin, guitar, backing vocals; Dave Hull-Denholm – guitar, keyboards, vocals; Billy Mitchell – vocals, guitar, mandolin, banjo, keyboards	Disbanded	Dave Hull-Denholm – vocals, guitar, keyboards; Ray Jackson – vocals, mandolin, harmonica; Steve Daggett – vocals, keyboards, acoustic guitar; Charlie Harcourt – guitar, backing vocals; Paul Thompson – drums; Ian Thomson – bass guitar, backing vocals; Tom Leary – violin
2015	2015–2018	2018–2021	2021–2025
Dave Hull-Denholm – vocals, guitar, keyboards; Steve Daggett – vocals, keyboards, acoustic guitar, harmonica; Charlie Harcourt – guitar; Paul Thompson – drums; Ian Thomson – bass guitar; Tom Leary – violin; Rod Clements – vocals, slide guitar, guitar, mandolin	Dave Hull-Denholm – vocals, guitar, keyboards; Steve Daggett – vocals, keyboards, acoustic guitar, harmonica; Charlie Harcourt – guitar; Paul Thompson – drums; Ian Thomson – bass guitar; Rod Clements – vocals, slide guitar, guitar, mandolin, violin	Dave Hull-Denholm – vocals, guitar, keyboards; Steve Daggett – vocals, keyboards, acoustic guitar, harmonica; Paul Thompson – drums; Ian Thomson – bass guitar; Rod Clements – vocals, slide guitar, guitar, mandolin, violin	Dave Hull-Denholm – vocals, guitar, keyboards; Steve Daggett – vocals, keyboards, acoustic guitar, harmonica; Ian Thomson – bass guitar; Rod Clements – vocals, slide guitar, guitar, mandolin, violin; Paul Smith – drums
2025–present
Dave Hull-Denholm – vocals, guitar, keyboards; Steve Daggett – vocals, keyboards, acoustic guitar, harmonica; Rod Clements – vocals, slide guitar, guitar, mandolin, violin; Paul Smith – drums; Steve Cunningham – bass

== Discography ==
=== Studio albums ===
- Nicely Out of Tune (1970)
- Fog on the Tyne (1971)
- Dingly Dell (1972)
- Roll On, Ruby (1973)
- Happy Daze (1974)
- Back and Fourth (1978)
- The News (1979)
- Sleepless Nights (1982)
- Dance Your Life Away (1986)
- Amigos (1989)
- Elvis Lives on the Moon (1993)
- Here Comes the Neighbourhood (1998)
- Promenade (2002)

=== Live albums ===
- Lindisfarne Live (1973) - recorded at Newcastle City Hall in 1971
- Magic In The Air (1978) - recorded at Newcastle City Hall in 1977
- Lindisfarntastic (1983) - recorded at Newcastle City Hall in 1983
- Lindisfarntastic 2 (1984) - recorded at Newcastle City Hall in 1983
- Live (1993) - recorded at Nottingham in 1990
- Another Fine Mess (1995) - recorded at Newcastle City Hall on 2 July 1995
- Untapped And Acoustic (1997) - recorded at Marden High School on 12 December 1996
- The Cropredy Concert (1997) - recorded at The Cropredy Festival
- Lindisfarne Live At The Cambridge Folk Festival (1999) - recorded at The Cambridge Folk Festival in 1982 and 1986
- The River Sessions (2004) - recorded at the Apollo, Glasgow, in 1982 (CD 2 is Alan Hull solo radio performances from 1976 and 1978.)
- Real Live Lindisfarne (2018)

== Biographies ==
- Hill, Ian Dave, Fog on the Tyne: The Official History of Lindisfarne (Northdown Publishing, 1998), ISBN 978-1900711074
- Van der Kiste, John, We Can Swing Together: The Story of Lindisfarne (Fonthill Media, 2017), ISBN 978-1781555897
