= Alan Hull =

English singer-songwriter (1945-1995)

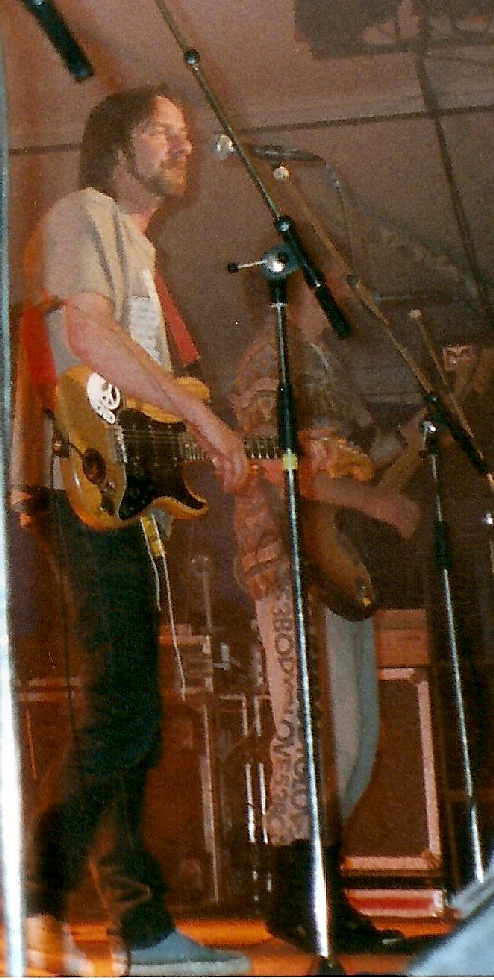
- Alan Hull on stage with Lindisfarne in 1991

Background information
- Born: James Alan Hull; 20 February 1945; Benwell, Newcastle upon Tyne, England
- Died: 17 November 1995 (aged 50) Newcastle upon Tyne, England
- Genres: Folk rock
- Instruments: Vocals; guitar; keyboards
- Years active: Mid 1960s–1995
- Formerly of: Lindisfarne; The Chosen Few; Skip Bifferty

James Alan Hull (20 February 1945 – 17 November 1995) was an English singer-songwriter and founding member of the Tyneside folk rock band Lindisfarne.

== Career ==
James Alan Hull was born on Tuesday, 20 February 1945 at 68 Sutton's Dwellings, Adelaide Terrace, Benwell, Newcastle upon Tyne. He began piano lessons at the age of nine, and guitar lessons two years later. He attended Rutherford Grammar School, Newcastle after sitting the eleven-plus in 1956 and was given a guitar at the age of twelve. Hull wrote his first song soon afterwards.

He became a member of the band The Chosen Few alongside keyboard player Mick Gallagher. He supported himself by working as a window cleaner, one year by working as a nurse at a mental hospital and as a driver for Newcastle Co-op TV Department while appearing as a folk singer and guitarist in local clubs before helping to form Brethren and Downtown Faction, which evolved into Lindisfarne in 1970. He also released a one-off solo single, "We Can Swing Together", which was re-recorded with the group on their first album, Nicely Out of Tune, and became a regular favourite in their stage performances.

As the group's most prolific songwriter and joint lead vocalist, Hull came to be regarded as its leader. In 1972, dissatisfied with the sound and critical reception of their third album Dingly Dell, he considered leaving the group but instead he and joint lead vocalist Ray "Jacka" Jackson formed a new six-piece Lindisfarne the following year, leaving the three other original members to form Jack The Lad. He also released his first solo album, Pipedream, the same year and published a book of poems, Mocking Horse. Hull appeared in "Squire", an episode of the BBC's Second City Firsts drama series.

Lindisfarne disbanded in 1973 and Hull released a second solo album, Squire, then formed the short-lived Radiator, which also included drummer Ray Laidlaw of Lindisfarne and Jack the Lad. Radiator released the 1977 Isn't It Strange album, and they toured with (or without) Horslips between July and December 1977, sometimes under the name Alan Hull's Radiator. By then the original line-up of Lindisfarne were reforming after a well-received series of sold-out Christmas shows at the Newcastle City Hall in 1976 which was broadcast on local radio. Thereafter he combined his musical career as front man of the group with a solo career.

Hull was a staunch Labour Party activist. For a time he was secretary of his local constituency Labour Party. He performed in Blackpool to coincide with the Labour Party conference in 1990, and played at numerous benefit concerts for striking or redundant miners and shipyard workers.

In January 1994, he recorded Back to Basics, a live all-acoustic survey of the best of his songwriting from 1970 onwards.

== Death ==
On the night of Friday, 17 November 1995, Hull suddenly collapsed at his home in North Shields and was pronounced dead on arrival at North Tyneside General Hospital at 11.30 pm. A post-mortem held on 20 November revealed his death to be the result of a coronary thrombosis. Hull's funeral was held on 24 November at North Shields Crematorium. Musician Chris Rea and actor Tim Healy were among those to attend. Hull's ashes were later scattered at the mouth of the River Tyne.

At the time of Hull's death, a new album, Statues & Liberties, was being completed; it was released in 1996.

On 19 July 2012, following a public campaign led by Barry McKay, Lindisfarne's manager during the 1970s, an Alan Hull memorial plaque was unveiled on the front of Newcastle City Hall, at a ceremony attended by hundreds of fans, and broadcast and filmed by Sky and ITV Tyne Tees.

== Personal life ==
Hull married Patricia Sharp on 22 August 1966, and they had three daughters.

== Documentary film ==
A BBC 4 documentary on the life of Hull, called Lindisfarne’s Geordie Genius: The Alan Hull Story, was first broadcast on 26 November 2021. In the hour-long film Sam Fender follows the career and personal life of Hull. Archive footage of performances and interviews features in the programme, some of it previously unseen. There are also tributes from fans of the songs including Sting, Elvis Costello, Mark Knopfler, Dave Stewart and Peter Gabriel. Drummer Ray Laidlaw expressed the view that, despite Lindisfarne's success, Hull had not received sufficient recognition as "a 'world-class' songwriter", and he hoped to establish Hull's place in music history.

== Discography ==
=== Studio albums ===
- Pipedream (1973) UK No. 29, AUS No. 51
- Squire (1975)
- Phantoms (1979)
- On the Other Side (1983)
- Statues & Liberties (1996)

=== Compilation albums ===
- When War Is Over – The BBC Recordings 1973 & 1975 (1998)
- We Can Swing Together: The Anthology 1965–1995 (2005)
- Singing a song in the morning light/the legendary demo tapes 1967–1970 (2024)

=== Live albums ===
- Another Little Adventure (1988)
- Back to Basics (1994)
- Alright on the Night – Live at Clifton Poly 1975 (2009)

=== Singles ===
- "We Can Swing Together" / "Obadiah's Grave" (1970)
- "Numbers" / "Drinking Song" / "One Off Pat" (1973)
- "Justanothersadsong" / "Waiting" (1973)
- "Dan The Plan" / "One More Bottle of Wine" (1975)
- "One More Bottle of Wine" / "Squire" (1975)
- "Crazy Woman" / "Golden Oldies" (1975)
- "I Wish You Well" / "Love Is The Answer" (1979)
- "A Walk in the Sea" / "Corporation Rock" (1979)
- "Malvinas Melody" / "Ode to a Taxman" (1983)

=== With Radiator ===
- Isn't It Strange (1977)
