= List of Yes concert tours (1960s–70s) =

The English progressive rock band Yes has toured for five decades.

The band played live from its creation in summer 1968. Their first overseas shows were in Belgium and the Netherlands in June 1969. They played regularly through December 1980, with the band splitting up early the next year. The band reformed in 1983, and regular tours resumed in 1984 and continued over the next few decades. The longest break in touring came from late 2004 through late 2008. Touring has tended to focus on the UK and the rest of Europe, North America and Japan, but the band have also played other parts of the world, notably Australia.

== Early shows ==
Band:

- Jon Anderson
- Peter Banks
- Bill Bruford, or Tony O'Reilly (September–November 1968)
- Tony Kaye
- Chris Squire

Songs played in this period:

- "Astral Traveller" (Jon Anderson)
- "No Opportunity Necessary, No Experience Needed" (Richie Havens) (originally by Havens in 1968)
- "Carpet Man" (Jim Webb) (originally by The 5th Dimension in 1967)
- "Dear Father" (Anderson, Chris Squire)
- "The Prophet" (Anderson, Squire)
- "Sweet Dreams" (Anderson, David Foster)
- "Clear Days" (Anderson)
- "Then" (Anderson)
- "Beyond and Before" (Squire, Clive Bailey)
- "Everydays" (Stephen Stills) (originally by Buffalo Springfield in 1967)
- "Sweetness" (Anderson, Bailey, Squire)
- "I See You" (Roger McGuinn, David Crosby) (originally by The Byrds in 1966)
- "Time and a Word" (Anderson, Foster)
- "Every Little Thing" (Lennon–McCartney) (originally by The Beatles in 1964)
- "Looking Around" (Anderson, Squire)
- "For Everyone" (Anderson, Squire)
- "It's Love" (Felix Cavaliere, Eddie Brigati) (originally by The Young Rascals in 1966)
- "In the Midnight Hour" (Wilson Pickett, Steve Cropper) (originally by Pickett in 1965)
- "Eleanor Rigby" (Lennon–McCartney) (originally by the Beatles in 1966)
- "Something's Coming" (Leonard Bernstein, Stephen Sondheim) (from the Broadway musical West Side Story in 1957)

Date	City	Country	Venue
3 August 1968	Mersea	United Kingdom	Mersea Youth Camp
5 August 1968	London	United Kingdom	Marquee Club
9 August 1968	Bracknell	United Kingdom	Bracknell Sports Center
10 August 1968	Wollaston	United Kingdom	Motown Club
17 August 1968	London	United Kingdom	Marquee Club
23 August 1968	Stoke-on-Trent	United Kingdom	The Place
30 August 1968	Welwyn	United Kingdom	Welwyn Civic Center
31 August 1968	London	United Kingdom	Black Sheep Club
6 September 1968	London	United Kingdom	Marquee Club
8 September 1968	King's Lynn	United Kingdom	Maid's Head
13 September 1968	Marlow	United Kingdom	Crown Hotel
15 September 1968	London	United Kingdom	Blaises Club
18 September 1968	London	United Kingdom	Blaises Club
19 September 1968	London	United Kingdom	Marquee Club
20 September 1968	Edmonton	United Kingdom	Cooks Ferry Inn
21 September 1968	Margate	United Kingdom	Dreamland Margate
22 September 1968	Margate	United Kingdom	Dreamland Margate
27 September 1968	Rushden	United Kingdom	West End Club
28 September 1968	London	United Kingdom	Marquee Club
5 October 1968	Hitchin	United Kingdom	Hermitage Ballroom
11 October 1968	Ombersley	United Kingdom	Wharf Hotel
12 October 1968	Cirencester	United Kingdom	Corn Hall
13 October 1968	London	United Kingdom	Blaises Club
14 October 1968	London	United Kingdom	Revolution Club
15 October 1968	London	United Kingdom	Royal Albert Hall
17 October 1968	London	United Kingdom	The Pheasantry
22 October 1968	London	United Kingdom	Blaises Club
25 October 1968	Leicester	United Kingdom	Granby Hall
26 October 1968	London	United Kingdom	Middle Earth
30 October 1968	London	United Kingdom	Blaises Club
1 November 1968	Marlow	United Kingdom	Crown Hotel
2 November 1968	London	United Kingdom	Marquee Club
5 November 1968 (Note: With Ian Wallace on drums due to O'Reilly falling ill.)	London	United Kingdom	Blaises Club
8 November 1968	London	United Kingdom	Granda Cinema
9 November 1968	Wollaston	United Kingdom	Motown Club
13 November 1968	London	United Kingdom	Marquee Club
15 November 1968	London	United Kingdom	The Roundhouse
16 November 1968	Leeds	United Kingdom	Leeds University
18 November 1968	Newcastle	United Kingdom	Newcastle City Hall
24 November 1968	London	United Kingdom	Blaises Club
25 November 1968	London	United Kingdom	Revolution Club
26 November 1968	London	United Kingdom	Royal Albert Hall
27 November 1968	London	United Kingdom	Marquee Club
30 November 1968	London	United Kingdom	Ronnie Scott's Jazz Club
6 December 1968	Wood Green	United Kingdom	Fishmongers Arms
7 December 1968	Bristol	United Kingdom	Bristol University
8 December 1968	London	United Kingdom	Marquee Club
12 December 1968	London	United Kingdom	Revolution Club
13 December 1968	London	United Kingdom	The Speakeasy
16 December 1968	London	United Kingdom	Revolution Club
17 December 1968	London	United Kingdom	Marquee Club
19 December 1968	London	United Kingdom	Royal Albert Hall
24 December 1968	London	United Kingdom	The Speakeasy
26 December 1968	London	United Kingdom	Blaises Club
31 December 1968	London	United Kingdom	The Speakeasy
1 January 1969	London	United Kingdom	Marquee Club
7 January 1969	London	United Kingdom	BBC Television Centre
8 January 1969	London	United Kingdom	Marquee Club
10 January 1969	London	United Kingdom	Maida Vale Studios
15 January 1969	London	United Kingdom	Marquee Club
18 January 1969	Portsmouth	United Kingdom	Portsmouth College
22 January 1969	London	United Kingdom	Marquee Club
23 January 1969	Wolverhampton	United Kingdom	Lafayette Club
24 January 1969	Plymouth	United Kingdom	Van Dike Club
29 January 1969	London	United Kingdom	Marquee Club
31 January 1969	Bournemouth	United Kingdom	The Ritz
1 February 1969	Reading	United Kingdom	Reading University
5 February 1969	London	United Kingdom	Marquee Club
12 February 1969	London	United Kingdom	Marquee Club
13 February 1969	Worthing	United Kingdom	Worthing Pier Pavilion
14 February 1969	Battersea	United Kingdom	Surrey University
15 February 1969	London	United Kingdom	Queen Elizabeth College
16 February 1969	Sunderland	United Kingdom	Peter Yes' Jazz Club
17 February 1969	Wolverhampton	United Kingdom	The Catacombs
19 February 1969	London	United Kingdom	Marquee Club
23 February 1969	London	United Kingdom	Maida Vale Studios
24 February 1969	Sheffield	United Kingdom	The Penthouse
25 February 1969	Cambridge	United Kingdom	Cambridge Theater
26 February 1969	London	United Kingdom	Marquee Club
27 February 1969	London	United Kingdom	The Speakeasy
28 February 1969	Richmond	United Kingdom	Richmond Athletic Ground
1 March 1969	Chesterfield	United Kingdom	Victoria Ballroom
5 March 1969	London	United Kingdom	Marquee Club
7 March 1969	York	United Kingdom	York University
8 March 1969	Sunderland	United Kingdom	Sunderland Empire
9 March 1969	Kidderminster	United Kingdom	Frank Freeman's Club
12 March 1969	London	United Kingdom	Marquee Club
15 March 1969	Southampton	United Kingdom	Gaumont Theater
16 March 1969	London	United Kingdom	London Country Club
17 March 1969	London	United Kingdom	BBC Studios
19 March 1969	London	United Kingdom	Marquee Club
20 March 1969	Salford	United Kingdom	Salford University
21 March 1969	Wolverhampton	United Kingdom	Wolverhampton University
22 March 1969	Battersea	United Kingdom	Brixton College
25 March 1969	London	United Kingdom	Hall of Kings
26 March 1969	London	United Kingdom	Marquee Club
28 March 1969	London	United Kingdom	Lyceum Ballroom
29 March 1969	Barnet	United Kingdom	Barnet College
2 April 1969	London	United Kingdom	Marquee Club
3 April 1969	Harrowfield	United Kingdom	Harrowfield Youth Center
4 April 1969	London	United Kingdom	The Speakeasy
9 April 1969	London	United Kingdom	Marquee Club
14 April 1969	London	United Kingdom	Marquee Club
16 April 1969	London	United Kingdom	Marquee Club
17 April 1969	London	United Kingdom	University College
21 April 1969	London	United Kingdom	Royal Albert Hall
23 April 1969	London	United Kingdom	Marquee Club
24 April 1969	Montreux	Switzerland	Montreux Casino
25 April 1969	Montreux	Switzerland	Montreux Casino
26 April 1969	Goddelau	West Germany	Tanz Club
27 April 1969	Goddelau	West Germany	Tanz Club
28 April 1969	London	United Kingdom	Marquee Club
29 April 1969	London	United Kingdom	Marquee Club
2 May 1969	Plymouth	United Kingdom	Van Dike Club
3 May 1969	Chelsea	United Kingdom	Chelsea College
8 May 1969	Scarborough	United Kingdom	The Penthouse
10 May 1969	Exeter	United Kingdom	University of Exeter
11 May 1969	Kidderminster	United Kingdom	Frank Freeman's Club
14 May 1969	London	United Kingdom	Marquee Club
16 May 1969	London	United Kingdom	Lyceum Theater
17 May 1969	London	United Kingdom	University College
18 May 1969	London	United Kingdom	Parliament Hill Fields
21 May 1969	London	United Kingdom	Harrods Way Inn
22 May 1969	London	United Kingdom	BBC Studios
24 May 1969	Southend-on-Sea	United Kingdom	Technical College
25 May 1969	Wolverhampton	United Kingdom	Lafayette Club
28 May 1969	London	United Kingdom	Marquee Club
29 May 1969	Plymouth	United Kingdom	Van Dike Club
31 May 1969	Brighton	United Kingdom	Brighton Polytechnic
2 June 1969	Sunderland	United Kingdom	Bay Hotel
4 June 1969	London	United Kingdom	BBC Studios
5 June 1969	Scarborough	United Kingdom	The Penthouse
6 June 1969	Hull	United Kingdom	The Fairground
9 June 1969	London	United Kingdom	Marquee Club
11 June 1969	London	United Kingdom	Marquee Club
13 June 1969	Leicester	United Kingdom	Leicester Technical College
15 June 1969	Kidderminster	United Kingdom	Frank Freeman's Club
16 June 1969	London	United Kingdom	Scotch of St. James
20 June 1969	Canterbury	United Kingdom	Canterbury University
21 June 1969	Antwerp	Belgium	Sporthal Arena Deurne
23 June 1969	London	United Kingdom	Marquee Club
25 June 1969	London	United Kingdom	Marquee Club
27 June 1969	Amsterdam	Netherlands	Jam TV
28 June 1969	Birmingham	United Kingdom	Custard Factory
29 June 1969	Redcar	United Kingdom	Redcar Jazz Club
30 June 1969	Sunderland	United Kingdom	Bay Hotel
2 July 1969	London	United Kingdom	Marquee Club
3 July 1969	London	United Kingdom	Holland Park
4 July 1969	Barnstaple	United Kingdom	Queens Hall
5 July 1969	Haverfordwest	United Kingdom	Haverfordwest Market Hall
6 July 1969	London	United Kingdom	Institute of Contemporary Arts
8 July 1969	London	United Kingdom	ICA Nash House
9 July 1969	London	United Kingdom	Marquee Club
10 July 1969	Penzance	United Kingdom	Winter Gardens
11 July 1969	London	United Kingdom	Lyceum Theater
12 July 1969	Nottingham	United Kingdom	Nottingham Racecourse
13 July 1969	Wembley	United Kingdom	Wembley Stadium
16 July 1969	London	United Kingdom	Marquee Club
18 July 1969	Belfast	United Kingdom	Ulster Hall
19 July 1969	Dublin	Ireland	Dublin National Stadium
~~20 July 1969~~	~~Cork~~	Ireland	~~Hibernian Football Stadium~~
23 July 1969	London	United Kingdom	Marquee Club
25 July 1969	South Shields	United Kingdom	Cellar Club
26 July 1969	Kirklevington	United Kingdom	Kirklevington Country Club
27 July 1969	Bridgend	United Kingdom	Kee Club
28 July 1969	Bristol	United Kingdom	Granary Club
30 July 1969	London	United Kingdom	Marquee Club
2 August 1969	Ryde	United Kingdom	The Music Box
3 August 1969	London	United Kingdom	BBC Studios
4 August 1969	London	United Kingdom	BBC Studios
6 August 1969	London	United Kingdom	Harrods Way Inn
7 August 1969	London	United Kingdom	Marquee Club
8 August 1969	Birmingham	United Kingdom	Mothers Club
9 August 1969	Plumpton	United Kingdom	Plumpton Racetrack
10 August 1969	London	United Kingdom	Marquee Club
11 August 1969	Paris	France	Île-de-France
13 August 1969	Tolworth	United Kingdom	Toby Jug
14 August 1969	London	United Kingdom	Marquee Club
15 August 1969	Barnstaple	United Kingdom	Queens Hall
16 August 1969	Plymouth	United Kingdom	Van Dike Club
20 August 1969	Hamburg	West Germany	Star Club
21 August 1969	Hamburg	West Germany	Star Club
22 August 1969	Lekkerkerk	Netherlands	Eland Club
23 August 1969	Lekkerkerk	Netherlands	Eland Club
24 August 1969	Maastricht	Netherlands	Zeeland Club
~~25 August 1969~~	~~Amsterdam~~	Netherlands	~~Paradiso~~
26 August 1969	Wiesbaden	West Germany	The Big Apple
27 August 1969	Goddelau	West Germany	Tanz Club
~~29 August 1969~~	Munich	West Germany	Blow Up Club
30 August 1969	Munich	West Germany	Blow Up Club
31 August 1969	Munich	West Germany	Blow Up Club
1 September 1969	Munich	West Germany	Blow Up Club
2 September 1969	Munich	West Germany	Blow Up Club
3 September 1969	Munich	West Germany	Blow Up Club
4 September 1969	Munich	West Germany	Blow Up Club
5 September 1969	Munich	West Germany	Blow Up Club
6 September 1969	Munich	West Germany	Blow Up Club
7 September 1969	Munich	West Germany	Blow Up Club
8 September 1969	Paris	France	Île-de-France
12 September 1969	Sheffield	United Kingdom	The Penthouse
13 September 1969	Kirklevington	United Kingdom	Kirklevington Country Club
14 September 1969	Bishop Auckland	United Kingdom	Queens Hotel
15 September 1969	Romford	United Kingdom	King's Head
18 September 1969	London	United Kingdom	Marquee Club
20 September 1969	Haverfordwest	United Kingdom	Market Hall
21 September 1969	Kidderminster	United Kingdom	Frank Freeman's Club
23 September 1969	Stoke-on-Trent	United Kingdom	The Place
26 September 1969	Bristol	United Kingdom	Bristol Technical College
27 September 1969	Malvern	United Kingdom	Malvern Winter Gardens
28 September 1969	Harrogate	United Kingdom	Harrogate Theater
3 October 1969	Plymouth	United Kingdom	Van Dike Club
4 October 1969	Bristol	United Kingdom	Bristol University
9 October 1969	Essen	West Germany	Grugahalle
11 October 1969	Newcastle	United Kingdom	Newcastle University
12 October 1969	Redcar	United Kingdom	Redcar Jazz Club
17 October 1969	Romford	United Kingdom	King's Head
18 October 1969	Chesterfield	United Kingdom	Victoria Ballroom
20 October 1969	Sunderland	United Kingdom	Bay Hotel
24 October 1969	Nottingham	United Kingdom	Nottingham University
25 October 1969	Cardiff	United Kingdom	Cardiff University
27 October 1969	Amougies	Belgium	Mont-de-l'Enclus
28 October 1969	Brussels	Belgium	Theater 140
30 October 1969	London	United Kingdom	Marquee Club
31 October 1969	Swansea	United Kingdom	Swansea University
1 November 1969	Manchester	United Kingdom	University of Manchester
2 November 1969	London	United Kingdom	Lyceum Theater
3 November 1969	London	United Kingdom	The Roundhouse
7 November 1969	Birmingham	United Kingdom	Custard Factory
13 November 1969	London	United Kingdom	Marquee Club
14 November 1969	Newcastle	United Kingdom	Newcastle City Hall
15 November 1969	Folkestone	United Kingdom	Marine Pavilion
26 November 1969	Basel	Switzerland	Komodie Theater
27 November 1969	Bern	Switzerland	Chikito Club
28 November 1969	Gerlafingen	Switzerland	Grunau Restaurant
29 November 1969	Locarno	Switzerland	Rex Cinema
30 November 1969	Locarno	Switzerland	Rex Cinema
2 December 1969	Lausanne	Switzerland	Electric Circus
5 December 1969	Stoke-on-Trent	United Kingdom	College of Art
6 December 1969	Weston-super-Mare	United Kingdom	Winter Gardens Pavilion
7 December 1969	Croydon	United Kingdom	The Greyhound
9 December 1969	Harrowfield	United Kingdom	Harrowfield Youth Center
10 December 1969	West Hampstead	United Kingdom	Railway Hotel
11 December 1969	Leicester	United Kingdom	Fletcher Hall
12 December 1969	Newport	United Kingdom	In-Place
13 December 1969	London	United Kingdom	Imperial College
14 December 1969	Redcar	United Kingdom	Redcar Jazz Club
15 December 1969	London	United Kingdom	Kingston Hotel
19 December 1969	Harrowfield	United Kingdom	Harrowfield Youth Center
21 December 1969	Sheffield	United Kingdom	The Penthouse
22 December 1969	Wolverhampton	United Kingdom	The Catacombs
24 December 1969	Southall	United Kingdom	Northcote Arms
26 December 1969	London	United Kingdom	Marquee Club
27 December 1969	Kirklevington	United Kingdom	Kirklevington Country Club
28 December 1969	Birmingham	United Kingdom	Mothers Club
30 December 1969	London	United Kingdom	The Roundhouse
31 December 1969	Plymouth	United Kingdom	Van Dike Club
7 January 1970	Tolworth	United Kingdom	Toby Jug
10 January 1970	Paris	France	L'Olympia
11 January 1970	Paris	France	L'Olympia
17 January 1970	Bradford	United Kingdom	Bradford University
19 January 1970	London	United Kingdom	BBC Studios
23 January 1970	Stoke-on-Trent	United Kingdom	Kings Hall
24 January 1970	Southampton	United Kingdom	Southampton University
25 January 1970	Croydon	United Kingdom	The Greyhound
27 January 1970	Llanelli	United Kingdom	Glen Ballroom
29 January 1970	Boston	United Kingdom	Starlight Room
30 January 1970	Coventry	United Kingdom	Lancaster Polytechnic
31 January 1970	Uxbridge	United Kingdom	Brunel University
1 February 1970	Sunderland	United Kingdom	Sunderland Empire
7 February 1970	London	United Kingdom	Royal Festival Hall
8 February 1970	Oxford	United Kingdom	Oxford Polytechnic
14 February 1970	Canterbury	United Kingdom	Kent University
19 February 1970	Copenhagen	Denmark	Revolution Club
20 February 1970	Gothenburg	Sweden	Que Club
21 February 1970	Stockholm	Sweden	Stockholm University
22 February 1970	Oslo	Norway	Club Seven
24 February 1970	Bremen	West Germany	Beat Club
26 February 1970	Barnstaple	United Kingdom	Queens Hall
27 February 1970	Plymouth	United Kingdom	Van Dike Club
28 February 1970	Knightsbridge	United Kingdom	Imperial College
6 March 1970	Bingley	United Kingdom	Bingley College
7 March 1970	Leeds	United Kingdom	Leeds University
9 March 1970	Darlington	United Kingdom	Darlington Civic Theater
12 March 1970	London	United Kingdom	BBC Studios
13 March 1970	Gloucester	United Kingdom	Guildhall Arts Center
14 March 1970	Croydon	United Kingdom	Croydon College of Art
16 March 1970	Düsseldorf	West Germany	BBC Studios
20 March 1970	Salford	United Kingdom	Salford University
21 March 1970	London	United Kingdom	Queen Elizabeth Hall
22 March 1970	London	United Kingdom	Queen Elizabeth Hall
27 March 1970	Roubaix	France	The Coliseum
28 March 1970	Salisbury	United Kingdom	Alex's Disco
29 March 1970	Birmingham	United Kingdom	Mothers Club
30 March 1970	Devon	United Kingdom	Magic Circus
3 April 1970	Cologne	West Germany	Sporthalle
4 April 1970	Erlangen	West Germany	University of Technology
5 April 1970	Aschaffenburg	West Germany	Colos-Saal
7 April 1970	London	United Kingdom	BBC Studios
10 April 1970	London	United Kingdom	Marquee Club
14 April 1970	Surbiton	United Kingdom	Surbiton Assembly Room
16 April 1970	Weymouth	United Kingdom	Pavilion Ballroom
17 April 1970	Devizes	United Kingdom	Devizes Corn Exchange
18 April 1970	Luton	United Kingdom	Luton Technical College
~~24 April 1970~~	~~Sheffield~~	United Kingdom	~~The Penthouse~~
~~26 April 1970~~	~~Richmond~~	United Kingdom	~~The Castle~~
~~3 May 1970~~	~~Harrogate~~	United Kingdom	~~Harrogate Theater~~
~~16 May 1970~~	~~Düsseldorf~~	~~West Germany~~	~~Düsseldorf Music Festival~~
~~23 May 1970~~	~~Talbot~~	~~United Kingdom~~	~~Afan Lido Lesiure Center~~
~~6 June 1970~~	~~Yeovil~~	~~United Kingdom~~	~~Yeovil Football Club~~

Guitarist Peter Banks was fired from the band after the gig at Luton College on 18 April 1970. The last shows were cancelled due to lack of a guitarist.

== The Yes Album Tour ==
Band:

- Jon Anderson
- Bill Bruford
- Steve Howe
- Tony Kaye
- Chris Squire

On various dates of the tour, Yes were supported by Black Sabbath, Uriah Heep, Supertramp, Deep Purple, Wishbone Ash, The Strawbs, Iron Butterfly, Queen, and Jethro Tull. At other performances, such as festivals, the band shared the bill with Pink Floyd and Elton John.

Beginning with the 1971 dates (when Yes began to be supported by Iron Butterfly), ticket prices were set at 10s—approximately £10 ($16 USD) in 2012.

Date	City	Country	Venue
Europe
17 July 1970	London	United Kingdom	Lyceum Ballroom
18 July 1970	Birmingham	United Kingdom	Mothers Club
19 July 1970	Redcar	United Kingdom	Redcar Jazz Club
24 July 1970	London	United Kingdom	Brompton Hall
26 July 1970	Croydon	United Kingdom	The Greyhound
31 July 1970	Plymouth	United Kingdom	Van Dike Club
2 August 1970	Croydon	United Kingdom	The Greyhound
9 August 1970	Plumpton	United Kingdom	Plumpton Racetrack
14 August 1970	Leytonstone	United Kingdom	The Red Lion
16 August 1970	Barkisland	United Kingdom	Krumlin
18 August 1970	London	United Kingdom	Marquee Club
21 August 1970	Devon	United Kingdom	The Underground
22 August 1970	Dagenham	United Kingdom	Village Underground
29 August 1970	Lincoln	United Kingdom	Knickerbockers
31 August 1970	Redcar	United Kingdom	Redcar Jazz Club
5 September 1970	Huy	Belgium	Atelier Rock
6 September 1970	Dortmund	West Germany	Fantasio
10 September 1970	Swansea	United Kingdom	Brangwyn Hall
11 September 1970	Swansea	United Kingdom	Brangwyn Hall
12 September 1970	Colchester	United Kingdom	Corn Exchange
18 September 1970	Eltham	United Kingdom	Avery Hill College
19 September 1970	Bishop's Stortford	United Kingdom	Rhodes Center
20 September 1970	Nottingham	United Kingdom	Nottingham Boat Club
22 September 1970	Birmingham	United Kingdom	Mayfair Club
23 September 1970	Barry	United Kingdom	Barry Memorial Hall
26 September 1970	Margate	United Kingdom	Margate Hall
27 September 1970	Croydon	United Kingdom	The Greyhound
28 September 1970	Aberystwyth	United Kingdom	Aberystwyth University
1 October 1970	Scarborough	United Kingdom	Open Air Theater
2 October 1970	Leicester	United Kingdom	Loughborough University
3 October 1970	Watford	United Kingdom	Watford Technical College
8 October 1970	Manchester	United Kingdom	UMIST
9 October 1970	Stratford	United Kingdom	Cox's Yard
10 October 1970	London	United Kingdom	Queen Mary College
15 October 1970	Dundee	United Kingdom	Dundee University
16 October 1970	Newcastle	United Kingdom	Newcastle City Hall
17 October 1970	Malvern	United Kingdom	Malvern Winter Gardens
23 October 1970	Leeds	United Kingdom	Leeds University
24 October 1970	Plymouth	United Kingdom	Royal Theater
26 October 1970	Romford	United Kingdom	King's Head
30 October 1970	Guildford	United Kingdom	University of Surrey
31 October 1970	London	United Kingdom	Queen Elizabeth Hall
~~2 November 1970~~	Dunstable	United Kingdom	Dunstable Civic Hall
~~3 November 1970~~	Dunstable	United Kingdom	Dunstable Civic Hall
5 November 1970	Bern	Switzerland	National Theater
6 November 1970	Bern	Switzerland	National Theater
7 November 1970	Zurich	Switzerland	Rote Fabrik
10 November 1970	Munich	West Germany	Blow Up Club
13 November 1970	London	United Kingdom	Citypolyents
14 November 1970	Bradford	United Kingdom	University Of Bradford
20 November 1970	Lancaster	United Kingdom	Lancaster University
21 November 1970	Oxford	United Kingdom	Oxford Polytechnic
22 November 1970	Plymouth	United Kingdom	Van Dike Club
~~24 November 1970~~	Bradford	United Kingdom	University of Bradford
25 November 1970	Cambridge	United Kingdom	Cambridge Theater
27 November 1970	Southend-on-Sea	United Kingdom	Technical College
28 November 1970	Boston	United Kingdom	Boston Music Room
~~1 December 1970~~	London	United Kingdom	Marquee Club
~~2 December 1970~~	Manchester	United Kingdom	Manchester College of Art
~~4 December 1970~~	Lancaster	United Kingdom	Lancaster University
~~5 December 1970~~	Liverpool	United Kingdom	Liverpool Stadium
8 December 1970	Newcastle	United Kingdom	Newcastle City Hall
9 December 1970	Hull	United Kingdom	Hull University
10 December 1970	Middlesbrough	United Kingdom	The Pavilion
11 December 1970	Warrington	United Kingdom	Thunderdome
13 December 1970	Bromley	United Kingdom	Highams Hill Farm
14 December 1970	Dunstable	United Kingdom	Queensway Hall
18 December 1970	London	United Kingdom	Lyceum Theater
19 December 1970	Folkestone	United Kingdom	Leas Cliff Hall
20 December 1970	Cleethorpes	United Kingdom	Cleethorpes Winter Gardens
22 December 1970	Shrewsbury	United Kingdom	Shrewsbury Music Hall
~~26 December 1970~~	Brighton	United Kingdom	The Big Apple
3 January 1971	Croydon	United Kingdom	The Greyhound
8 January 1971	Eindhoven	Netherlands	Parktheater
9 January 1971	Amsterdam	Netherlands	Het Concertgebouw
10 January 1971	Rotterdam	Netherlands	De Doelen
13 January 1971	Glasgow	United Kingdom	Green's Playhouse
14 January 1971	Newcastle	United Kingdom	Newcastle City Hall
15 January 1971	Lancaster	United Kingdom	Freedom Hall
16 January 1971	Southsea	United Kingdom	Portsmouth Polytechnic
17 January 1971	Bristol	United Kingdom	Colston Hall
18 January 1971	London	United Kingdom	Royal Albert Hall
19 January 1971	Birmingham	United Kingdom	Birmingham Town Hall
21 January 1971	Southampton	United Kingdom	Southampton Guildhall
23 January 1971	Aarhus	Denmark	Vejlby-Risskov Hall
24 January 1971	Gothenburg	Sweden	Gothenburg Concert Hall
25 January 1971	Copenhagen	Denmark	Falkoner Theater
29 January 1971	Lille	France	Église Saint-André
30 January 1971	Lyon	France	Lyon Amphitheater
31 January 1971	Paris	France	Palais des Sports
2 February 1971	Brussels	Belgium	Palais des Beaux-Arts
~~5 February 1971~~	Barnstaple	United Kingdom	Queens Hall
~~6 February 1971~~	Cardiff	United Kingdom	Llandaff Technical College
~~7 February 1971~~	Redcar	United Kingdom	Redcar Jazz Club
8 February 1971	Liège	Belgium	Conservatoire de Liège
12 February 1971	New Cross	United Kingdom	Goldsmiths College
13 February 1971	London	United Kingdom	London School of Economics
19 February 1971	Leeds	United Kingdom	Leeds University
20 February 1971	Kingston upon Thames	United Kingdom	Kingston Polytechnic
27 February 1971	Dagenham	United Kingdom	Dagenham Roundhouse
4 March 1971	Liverpool	United Kingdom	Liverpool Stadium
5 March 1971	Doncaster	United Kingdom	Top Rank Suite
6 March 1971	Brighton	United Kingdom	The Big Apple
7 March 1971	Redcar	United Kingdom	Redcar Jazz Club
9 March 1971	Birmingham	United Kingdom	Birmingham Town Hall
10 March 1971	Bournemouth	United Kingdom	Bournemouth Winter Gardens
12 March 1971	Cardiff	United Kingdom	Cardiff University
14 March 1971	Blackburn	United Kingdom	King George's Hall
15 March 1971	Guildford	United Kingdom	Guildford Civic Hall
16 March 1971	Nottingham	United Kingdom	Albert Hall
17 March 1971	Guildford	United Kingdom	Guildford Civic Hall
19 March 1971	Stirling	United Kingdom	Stirling University
20 March 1971	Aviemore	United Kingdom	Aviemore Sports Center
21 March 1971	Dunfermline	United Kingdom	Dumfermline Cinema
22 March 1971	Glasgow	United Kingdom	Glasgow City Center
23 March 1971	Norwich	United Kingdom	Norwich Lads Club
25 March 1971	Harrogate	United Kingdom	Royal Hall
27 March 1971	West Berlin	West Germany	Deutschlandhalle
28 March 1971	West Berlin	West Germany	Deutschlandhalle
30 March 1971	Wolverhampton	United Kingdom	Wolverhampton Civic Hall
4 April 1971	Hemel Hempstead	United Kingdom	Hempstead Pavilion
6 April 1971	Manchester	United Kingdom	Free Trade Hall
8 April 1971	Leeds	United Kingdom	Leeds Town Hall
10 April 1971	Surbiton	United Kingdom	Shoreditch Town Hall
12 April 1971	London	United Kingdom	BBC Television Centre
15 April 1971	Frankfurt	West Germany	Volksbildungsheim
16 April 1971	Böblingen	West Germany	Sporthalle
17 April 1971	Saarbrücken	West Germany	Saarland Hall
18 April 1971	Hamburg	West Germany	Hamburg Music Hall
24 April 1971	Nelson	United Kingdom	Imperial
25 April 1971	London	United Kingdom	The Roundhouse
30 April 1971	Luton	United Kingdom	Luton Recreation Center
1 May 1971	Barking	United Kingdom	Barking Polytechnic
2 May 1971	Stoke-on-Trent	United Kingdom	Trentham Gardens
6 May 1971	Chatham	United Kingdom	Central Hall
7 May 1971	Oxford	United Kingdom	Oxford Town Hall
9 May 1971	Rome	Italy	Teatro Brancaccio
10 May 1971	Milan	Italy	Teatro Lirico
11 May 1971	Arezzo	Italy	Teatro Tenda
14 May 1971	Birmingham	United Kingdom	Birmingham University
15 May 1971	Norwich	United Kingdom	Norwich Lads Club
16 May 1971	Leicester	United Kingdom	De Montfort Hall
21 May 1971	Liverpool	United Kingdom	Liverpool University
22 May 1971	Manchester	United Kingdom	Manchester University
23 May 1971	Harrogate	United Kingdom	Royal Hall
~~29 May 1971~~	Exeter	United Kingdom	Exeter University
~~4 June 1971~~	Clacton	United Kingdom	Princess Theater
5 June 1971	West Berlin	West Germany	Sportpalast
~~18 June 1971~~	Southport	United Kingdom	Floral Hall
North America
24 June 1971	Edmonton	Canada	Edmonton Gardens
25 June 1971	Vancouver	Canada	PNE Coliseum
26 June 1971	Seattle	United States	Seattle Center Coliseum
27 June 1971	Sacramento	United States	Sacramento Memorial Auditorium
28 June 1971	Los Angeles	United States	Whisky A Go Go
29 June 1971	Los Angeles	United States	Whisky A Go Go
30 June 1971	Oklahoma City	United States	Oklahoma City Music Hall
1 July 1971	San Antonio	United States	San Antonio Municipal Auditorium
2 July 1971	Dallas	United States	Dallas Memorial Auditorium
3 July 1971	Houston	United States	Hofheinz Pavilion
4 July 1971	New Orleans	United States	The Warehouse
5 July 1971	Indianapolis	United States	National Guard Armory
6 July 1971	DeLand	United States	Stetson University
7 July 1971	Orlando	United States	Orlando Sports Center
8 July 1971	Hampton	United States	Hampton Beach Ballroom
9 July 1971	Wildwood	United States	Wildwood Convention Center
10 July 1971	Asbury Park	United States	Asbury Park Convention Hall
11 July 1971	Alexandria	United States	Alexandria Roller Rink
14 July 1971	Port Chester	United States	Capitol Theater
15 July 1971	Port Chester	United States	Capitol Theater
16 July 1971	Detroit	United States	Eastown Theater
17 July 1971	Detroit	United States	Eastown Theater
18 July 1971	Toronto	Canada	York Stadium
19 July 1971	Ottawa	Canada	Ottawa Civic Center
20 July 1971	Cleveland	United States	Allen Theater
23 July 1971	New York City	United States	Gaelic Park
24 July 1971	New Haven	United States	Yale Bowl
Final show
31 July 1971	London	United Kingdom	Crystal Palace Bowl

=== Cancelled shows ===
Date	City	Country
18 May 1970	Geleen	Netherlands (first Pinkpop Festival)
2 November 1970	Dunstable	United Kingdom
3 November 1970	Dunstable	United Kingdom
24 November 1970	Bradford	United Kingdom
1 December 1970	London	United Kingdom
2 December 1970	Manchester	United Kingdom
4 December 1970	Lancaster	United Kingdom
5 December 1970	Liverpool	United Kingdom
26 December 1970	Brighton	United Kingdom
28 January 1971	Bremen	West Germany
29 January 1971	Lille	France
30 January 1971	Lyon	France
31 January 1971	Brussels	Belgium
1 February 1971	Paris	France
2 February 1971	Paris	France
6 February 1971	Cardiff	United Kingdom
7 February 1971	Redcar	United Kingdom
8 February 1971	Liėge	Belgium
9 February 1971	Brussels	Belgium
29 May 1971	Exeter	United Kingdom
4 June 1971	Clacton	United Kingdom
5 June 1971	West Berlin	West Germany
18 June 1971	Southport	United Kingdom
26 June 1971	Sheffield	United Kingdom
31 June 1971	Boston	United States

The February 1971 shows in Paris were cancelled due to rioting. After leaving France, the band had to cancel some UK shows after their van was involved in a road collision.

== Fragile Tour ==
Band:

- Jon Anderson
- Bill Bruford
- Steve Howe
- Chris Squire
- Rick Wakeman

The tour saw the band play a total of 111 concerts in the United Kingdom, the Netherlands, the United States, and Belgium over four legs—two European legs and two North American legs.

Support came from Jonathan Swift, Ten Years After, Mary Wells, Emerson, Lake and Palmer, The J. Geils Band, King Crimson, The Blues Project, and Shawn Phillips. At a 16 March 1972 concert in Tucson, Arizona, the band supported Black Sabbath.

=== Setlist ===
Setlist:

- "Roundabout" (Anderson, Howe)
- "I've Seen All Good People" (Anderson, Squire)
- "Mood for a Day" (Howe)
- "Clap" (Howe)
- "Heart of the Sunrise" (Anderson, Squire, Bruford)
- Wakeman solo (Rick Wakeman)
- "Long Distance Runaround" (Anderson)
- "The Fish (Schindleria Praematurus)" (Squire)
- "Perpetual Change" (Anderson, Squire)
- "Yours Is No Disgrace" (Anderson, Squire, Howe, Kaye, Bruford)
- "South Side of the Sky" (only occasionally after 2 October 1971) (Anderson, Squire)

=== Tour dates ===
Date	City	Country	Venue
Europe
24 September 1971	Barnstaple	United Kingdom	Queens Hall
25 September 1971	Devizes	United Kingdom	Devizes Corn Exchange
30 September 1971	Leicester	United Kingdom	De Montfort Hall
1 October 1971	Manchester	United Kingdom	Free Trade Hall
2 October 1971	Bradford	United Kingdom	St. George's Hall
3 October 1971	Hemel Hempstead	United Kingdom	Hempstead Pavilion
4 October 1971	Aberdeen	United Kingdom	Aberdeen Music Hall
6 October 1971	Glasgow	United Kingdom	Green's Playhouse
8 October 1971	London	United Kingdom	Royal Festival Hall
10 October 1971	Dundee	United Kingdom	Caird Hall
11 October 1971	Wolverhampton	United Kingdom	Wolverhampton Civic Hall
12 October 1971	Bristol	United Kingdom	Colston Hall
13 October 1971	Sheffield	United Kingdom	Sheffield City Hall
15 October 1971	Stockton-on-Tees	United Kingdom	ABC Theater
16 October 1971	Newcastle	United Kingdom	Newcastle City Hall
17 October 1971	Stoke	United Kingdom	Trentham Gardens
18 October 1971	Birmingham	United Kingdom	Birmingham Town Hall
21 October 1971	Warwick	United Kingdom	University of Warwick
22 October 1971	Leeds	United Kingdom	Leeds University
23 October 1971	Edinburgh	United Kingdom	Empire Theater
25 October 1971	Chatham	United Kingdom	Central Hall
26 October 1971	Liverpool	United Kingdom	Liverpool Stadium
27 October 1971	Southampton	United Kingdom	Southampton Guildhall
28 October 1971	Southampton	United Kingdom	Southampton Guildhall
~~29 October 1971~~	Rotterdam	Netherlands	Rotterdam Ahoy
31 October 1971	Amsterdam	Netherlands	Het Concertgebouw
North America
~~2 November 1971~~	Oakland	United States	Oakland–Alameda County Coliseum
3 November 1971	Los Angeles	United States	Whisky a Go Go
4 November 1971	Los Angeles	United States	Whisky a Go Go
5 November 1971	Los Angeles	United States	Whisky a Go Go
6 November 1971	Los Angeles	United States	Whisky a Go Go
7 November 1971	Los Angeles	United States	Whisky a Go Go
8 November 1971	San Francisco	United States	Winterland
9 November 1971	San Diego	United States	San Diego Coliseum
10 November 1971	Inglewood	United States	Inglewood Forum
11 November 1971	Inglewood	United States	Inglewood Forum
12 November 1971	Oklahoma City	United States	Oklahoma City Civic Center
13 November 1971	Philadelphia	United States	The Spectrum
14 November 1971	Chicago	United States	Auditorium Theater
15 November 1971	Detroit	United States	Eastown Theater
16 November 1971	Detroit	United States	Eastown Theater
17 November 1971	Elyria	United States	Elyria Catholic High School
19 November 1971	Richmond	United States	William and Mary Hall
20 November 1971	Durham	United States	Duke Indoor Stadium
21 November 1971	DeLand	United States	Stetson University
22 November 1971	Atlanta	United States	Atlanta Municipal Auditorium
23 November 1971	Baltimore	United States	Baltimore Civic Center
24 November 1971	New York City	United States	Academy of Music
25 November 1971	New York City	United States	Academy of Music
27 November 1971	New York City	United States	Ritz Theater
28 November 1971	Stony Brook	United States	Stony Brook University
30 November 1971	New York City	United States	Genesio College
1 December 1971	Waterbury	United States	Palace Theater
2 December 1971	Cincinnati	United States	Reflections
3 December 1971	Akron	United States	Akron Civic Theater
4 December 1971	Gettysburg	United States	Gettysburg College
5 December 1971	Plattsburgh	United States	SUNY Plattsburgh
8 December 1971	Pittsburgh	United States	Pittsburgh Civic Arena
9 December 1971	Gaithersburg	United States	Montgomery Country Fairgrounds
10 December 1971	Carlisle	United States	Dickinson College
11 December 1971	Garden City	United States	Nassau Community College
12 December 1971	Newark	United States	Newark Symphony Hall
14 December 1971	Boston	United States	Orpheum Theater
15 December 1971	Cleveland	United States	Allen Theater
16 December 1971	Pittsburgh	United States	Syria Mosque
18 December 1971	New Orleans	United States	The Warehouse
Europe
14 January 1972	London	United Kingdom	Rainbow Theater
15 January 1972	London	United Kingdom	Rainbow Theater
19 January 1972	Leuven	Belgium	University of Leuven
20 January 1972	Antwerp	Belgium	Cinema Roma
21 January 1972	Brussels	Belgium	Auditorium Q
22 January 1972	Amsterdam	Netherlands	Het Concertgebouw
23 January 1972	Rotterdam	Netherlands	De Doelen
24 January 1972	Breda	Netherlands	Het Turfship
28 January 1972	Bristol	United Kingdom	Top Rank Suite
29 January 1972	Boston	United Kingdom	Starlight Room
30 January 1972	Bristol	United Kingdom	Colston Hall
31 January 1972	Manchester	United Kingdom	Free Trade Hall
North America
18 February 1972	Bethany	United States	Bethany College
19 February 1972	New York City	United States	Academy of Music
21 February 1972	Asbury Park	United States	Sunshine Inn
22 February 1972	Princeton	United States	McCarter Theater
23 February 1972	New York City	United States	Academy of Music
24 February 1972	Burlington	United States	Patrick Gymnasium
25 February 1972	Smithfield	United States	Meehan Auditorium
26 February 1972	Passaic	United States	Capitol Theater
27 February 1972	Waterbury	United States	Palace Theater
28 February 1972	Buffalo	United States	Kleinhans Music Hall
29 February 1972	New York City	United States	Ritz Theater
1 March 1972	Rochester	United States	Auditorium Theater
2 March 1972	Syracuse	United States	Onondaga War Memorial Auditorium
~~3 March 1972~~	Richmond	United States	Richmond Coliseum
4 March 1972	Salem	United States	Roanoke Valley Civic Center
5 March 1972	Virginia Beach	United States	Virginia Beach Civic Center
6 March 1972	Wilmington	United States	University of North Carolina Wilmington
7 March 1972	Kutztown	United States	Schaeffer Auditorium
8 March 1972	Shippensburg	United States	Shippensburg University
10 March 1972	San Francisco	United States	Winterland Arena
11 March 1972	San Francisco	United States	Winterland Arena
13 March 1972	Denver	United States	Denver Coliseum
14 March 1972	Spokane	United States	Spokane Coliseum
15 March 1972	Los Angeles	United States	Inglewood Forum
16 March 1972	Tucson	United States	Tucson Community Center
17 March 1972	San Bernardino	United States	Swing Auditorium
18 March 1972	San Diego	United States	San Diego Sports Arena
19 March 1972	Las Vegas	United States	Las Vegas Convention Center
21 March 1972	Chicago	United States	Arie Crown Theater
22 March 1972	Detroit	United States	Cobo Hall
23 March 1972	Cincinnati	United States	Cincinnati Music Hall
24 March 1972	South Bend	United States	Morris Civic Auditorium
25 March 1972	Columbus	United States	Capital University
26 March 1972	Mentor	United States	Lakeland Community College
27 March 1972	Boston	United States	Aquarius Theater

=== Cancelled shows ===
Wilkinson (2003) lists only three shows from the tour as being cancelled. The first, on 9 October 1971 at the Edinburgh Empire Theatre, was cancelled after the PA system failed to arrive at the venue. A newspaper story at the time reported that the equipment van, travelling to Scotland from the Royal Festival Hall from the previous evening's concert, broke down in Birmingham. Similarly, two replacement vans also broke down. The band rescheduled the date for 23 October, with original tickets still valid. The band offered free posters to fans attending the 23 October show.

The second appearance to be cancelled was on 2 November at the Oakland Coliseum in Oakland, California—the first show of the tour's North American leg. The concert was cancelled as the band's PA system was stolen.

Other sources state that it was the 8 November show at the San Francisco Winterland Ballroom that was cancelled due to the stolen PA system, implying that the band appeared that night at the Oakland Coliseum (with a rented sound system) instead. The concert in Richmond VA on 3 March 1972, was also cancelled, and supposedly the band played at the Township Auditorium in Columbia, South Carolina instead. Additionally, reports exist of a show on 29 October in Rotterdam, Netherlands, that was also cancelled.

Date	City	Country
9 October 1971	Edinburgh	United Kingdom
2 November 1971	Oakland	United States

== Close to the Edge Tour ==
Band:

- Jon Anderson
- Steve Howe
- Chris Squire
- Rick Wakeman
- Alan White

The tour saw the band play a total of 97 concerts in the United States, Canada, the United Kingdom, Japan and Australia over seven legs—three North American legs, two European legs, an Asian leg and an Australasian leg.

Support came from Eagles, Gentle Giant, Edgar Winter, Lindisfarne, Mahavishnu Orchestra, Gary Wright, The J Geils Band, Wild Turkey, Badger, and Focus.

=== Setlist ===
Setlist:

- "Siberian Khatru" (Anderson, Howe, Wakeman)
- "I've Seen All Good People" (Anderson, Squire)
- "Heart of the Sunrise" (Anderson, Squire, Bruford)
- "Clap/Mood for a Day" (Howe)
- "America" (Paul Simon) (Dropped after 2 August 1972)
- "And You and I" (Anderson, Howe, Bruford, Squire)
- "Close to the Edge" (Anderson, Howe) (Added starting on 2 September 1972)
- Keyboards solo (Excerpts from The Six Wives of Henry VIII) (Wakeman)
- "Roundabout" (Anderson, Howe)

Encore:

- "Yours Is No Disgrace" (Anderson, Squire, Howe, Kaye, Bruford)
- "Starship Trooper" (Anderson, Squire, Howe) (Added starting on 15 December 1972)

Occasionally played:

- Keyboards solo (Excerpts from The Six Wives on Henry VIII) (Wakeman) (Played on 1 August 1972, 29 September 1972, 14, 15 November 1972, 16 December 1972)
- "South Side of the Sky" (Played on 8 April 1973)
- "Perpetual Change" (Played on 1 August 1972)
- "The Fish (Schindleria Praematurus)" (Played on 1 August 1972, 22 September 1972)
- "Long Distance Runaround" (Played on 1 August 1972, 22 September 1972)
- "Can and Brahms" (Played on 19, 21, 23, 26, 27, March 1973)
- "Colours of the Rainbow" (Jon Anderson a cappella song performed just before introducing the next song, "Close to the Edge")

Covers:

- "The Beautiful Land" (Played on 9 March 1973)
- "Tie Me Kangaroo Down Sport" (Played on 19, 23, 26 March 1973)
- "Sakura Sakura" (Played on 10, 11, 12, 14 March 1973)
- "America" (Played on 30, 31 July 1972, 2, 20 August 1972)
- "Waltzing Matilda" (Played on 19 March 1973)

=== Tour dates ===
Date	City	Country	Venue
North America
~~26 July 1972~~	~~Edwardsville~~	United States	~~Mississippi River Festival~~
~~27 July 1972~~	~~Louisville~~	United States	~~Commonwealth Convention Center~~
~~28 July 1972~~	~~Memphis~~	United States	~~Mid-South Coliseum~~
~~29 July 1972~~	~~Little Rock~~	United States	~~Barton Coliseum~~
30 July 1972	Dallas	United States	Dallas Convention Center
31 July 1972	Houston	United States	Hofheinz Pavilion
1 August 1972	Oklahoma City	United States	Fairgrounds Arena
2 August 1972	Denver	United States	Denver Coliseum
3 August 1972	Denver	United States	Denver Coliseum
4 August 1972	Long Beach	United States	Long Beach Arena
5 August 1972	Berkeley	United States	Berkeley Community Theatre
6 August 1972	Portland	United States	Memorial Coliseum
7 August 1972	Vancouver	Canada	Pacific Coliseum
8 August 1972	Seattle	United States	Paramount Theatre
10 August 1972	Trotwood	United States	Hara Arena
11 August 1972	Akron	United States	Rubber Bowl
12 August 1972	Asbury Park	United States	Asbury Park Convention Hall
13 August 1972	Columbia	United States	Merriweather Post Pavilion
~~14 August 1972~~	~~Hartford~~	United States	~~Dillon Stadium~~
15 August 1972	Philadelphia	United States	The Spectrum
16 August 1972	New York City	United States	Gaelic Park
18 August 1972	Louisville	United States	Louisville Convention Center
20 August 1972	Memphis	United States	Mid-South Coliseum
21 August 1972	Edwardsville	United States	Mississippi River Festival
Europe
2 September 1972	London	England	Crystal Palace Bowl
4 September 1972	Glasgow	Scotland	Kelvin Hall
5 September 1972	Glasgow	Scotland	Kelvin Hall
9 September 1972	Bristol	England	Colston Hall
10 September 1972	Manchester	England	Belle Vue Zoological Gardens – Kings Hall
12 September 1972	Newcastle	England	Newcastle City Hall
North America
15 September 1972	Pembroke Pines	United States	Hollywood Sportatorium
16 September 1972	Tampa	United States	Curtis Hixon Hall
17 September 1972	Jacksonville	United States	Jacksonville Memorial Coliseum
19 September 1972	Cincinnati	United States	Cincinnati Gardens
20 September 1972	Indianapolis	United States	Fairgrounds Coliseum
21 September 1972	Detroit	United States	Cobo Arena
22 September 1972	Chicago	United States	Arie Crown Theater
23 September 1972	Minneapolis	United States	The Armory
24 September 1972	Milwaukee	United States	MECCA Arena
25 September 1972	Hartford	United States	Dillon Stadium
26 September 1972	Boston	United States	Boston Music Hall
27 September 1972	Richmond	United States	Richmond Coliseum
29 September 1972	New Orleans	United States	Municipal Auditorium
30 September 1972	Atlanta	United States	Municipal Auditorium
1 October 1972	Tuscaloosa	United States	Memorial Coliseum
2 October 1972	Columbia	United States	Carolina Coliseum
3 October 1972	Charlotte	United States	Charlotte Coliseum
28 October 1972	Millersville	United States	Millersville University
29 October 1972	Syracuse	United States	Onondaga County War Memorial
30 October 1972	Waterloo	Canada	University of Waterloo
31 October 1972	Toronto	Canada	Maple Leaf Gardens
1 November 1972	Ottawa	Canada	Ottawa Civic Centre
2 November 1972	Montreal	Canada	Théâtre Saint-Denis
3 November 1972	Flint	United States	IMA Sports Arena
4 November 1972	Columbus	United States	St. John Arena
5 November 1972	Erie	United States	Hammermill Center
7 November 1972	Pittsburgh	United States	Civic Arena
8 November 1972	Huntington	United States	Veterans Memorial Fieldhouse
9 November 1972	Norfolk	United States	Norfolk Scope
10 November 1972	Roanoke	United States	Roanoke Civic Center
11 November 1972	Durham	United States	Cameron Indoor Stadium
12 November 1972	Greensboro	United States	Greensboro Coliseum
14 November 1972	Athens	United States	Georgia Coliseum
15 November 1972	Knoxville	United States	Knoxville Civic Coliseum
16 November 1972	Bowling Green	United States	Anderson Arena
17 November 1972	Terre Haute	United States	Hulman Center
18 November 1972	Notre Dame	United States	Edmund P. Joyce Center
19 November 1972	Kent	United States	Memorial Gymnasium
20 November 1972	Uniondale	United States	Nassau Coliseum
26 November 1972	Youngstown	United States	Struthers Fieldhouse
Europe
15 December 1972	London	England	Rainbow Theatre
16 December 1972	London	England	Rainbow Theatre
17 December 1972	Manchester	England	Hardrock Concert Theatre
Asia
8 March 1973	Tokyo	Japan	Tokyo Koseinenkin Kaikan
9 March 1973	Tokyo	Japan	Shibuya Koukaidou
10 March 1973	Tokyo	Japan	Kanda Kyoritsu Koudou
11 March 1973	Nagoya	Japan	Nagoya-shi Koukaido
12 March 1973	Osaka	Japan	Kouseinennkin Kaikan
14 March 1973	Kyoto	Japan	Kyoto Kaikan
Oceania
19 March 1973	Brisbane	Australia	Brisbane Festival Hall
21 March 1973	Adelaide	Australia	Apollo Stadium
23 March 1973	Melbourne	Australia	Festival Hall
26 March 1973	Sydney	Australia	Hordern Pavilion
27 March 1973	Sydney	Australia	Hordern Pavilion
~~29 March 1973~~	Auckland	New Zealand	Western Springs Stadium
~~30 March 1973~~	Wellington	New Zealand	Wellington Athletic Park
~~31 March 1973~~	Christchurch	New Zealand	Christchurch Town Hall
North America
4 April 1973	San Diego	United States	San Diego Sports Arena
5 April 1973	Inglewood	United States	Los Angeles Forum
6 April 1973	Las Vegas	United States	Ice Palace
7 April 1973	San Francisco	United States	Winterland Ballroom
8 April 1973	Albuquerque	United States	Johnson Gymnasium
9 April 1973	Phoenix	United States	Phoenix Symphony Hall
11 April 1973	Wichita	United States	Century II Convention Hall
12 April 1973	Oklahoma City	United States	Fairgrounds Arena
13 April 1973	San Antonio	United States	Municipal Auditorium
14 April 1973	Houston	United States	Hofheinz Pavilion
15 April 1973	Dallas	United States	Dallas Convention Center
16 April 1973	St. Louis	United States	Kiel Auditorium
17 April 1973	St. Louis	United States	Kiel Auditorium
18 April 1973	Nashville	United States	Nashville Municipal Auditorium
19 April 1973	Atlanta	United States	Alexander Memorial Coliseum
20 April 1973	Savannah	United States	Savannah Civic Center
21 April 1973	Tampa	United States	Curtis Hixon Hall
22 April 1973	West Palm Beach	United States	West Palm Beach Auditorium

=== Cancelled shows ===
The tour's first four scheduled shows were cancelled in the wake of Bill Bruford's resignation from the band. When Alan White was confirmed as a member, the tour began at the fifth scheduled show on 30 July 1972. A whole leg, covering South America, was cancelled. Dates and venues were never released, except for the scheduled performance at the Salle University in Acapulco on 1 May 1973.

Date	City	Country	Venue
26 July 1972	Edwardsville	United States	Edwardsville Amphitheatre
27 July 1972	Louisville	United States	Louisville Convention Center
28 July 1972	Memphis	United States	Mid-South Coliseum
29 July 1972	Little Rock	United States	Barton Coliseum
29 March 1973	Auckland	New Zealand	Western Springs
30 March 1973	Wellington	New Zealand	Athletic Park
31 March 1973	Christchurch	New Zealand	Town Hall
1 May 1973	Acapulco	Mexico	Salle University

== Tales from Topographic Oceans Tour ==
Tales from Topographic Oceans Tour
- World tour by Yes
- Location: North America; Europe
- Associated album: Tales From Topographic Oceans
- Start date: 16 November 1973
- End date: 23 April 1974
- Legs: 3
- No. of shows: 77

Band:

- Jon Anderson
- Steve Howe
- Chris Squire
- Rick Wakeman
- Alan White

Setlist:

- "Siberian Khatru" (Anderson, Howe, Wakeman)
- "And You and I" (Anderson, Howe, Bruford, Squire)
- "Close to the Edge" (Anderson, Howe)
- Wakeman solo (Wakeman)
  - sometimes omitted
- "The Revealing Science of God (Dance of the Dawn)" (Anderson, Squire, Howe, Wakeman, Alan White)
- "The Remembering (High the Memory)" (Anderson, Squire, Howe, Wakeman, White) (Dropped after 28 February 1974)
- "The Ancient (Giants Under the Sun)" (Anderson, Squire, Howe, Wakeman, White) ("People started falling asleep around side three", Squire recalled, "but you had to stick with it.")
- "Ritual (Nous Sommes du Soleil)" (Anderson, Squire, Howe, Wakeman, White)
- "Heart of the Sunrise" (Anderson, Squire, Bruford) (Dropped after 29 November 1973)
  Encore
- "Roundabout" (Anderson, Howe)
- "Starship Trooper" (Anderson, Squire, Howe) (Added on 27 February 1974)

Also occasionally played was:

- "Yours Is No Disgrace" (Played on 21 November 1973, 1 and 3 December 1973, and 14, 16, and 25 February 1974)
- "Firebird Suite" (Played on 28 February 1974 and 21 April 1974)
- "Heart of the Sunrise" (Played on 16, 17, 18, 19, 27, 29 November 1973)

Date	City	Country	Venue
UK
16 November 1973	Bournemouth	England	Winter Garden
17 November 1973	Bournemouth	England	Winter Garden
18 November 1973	Bristol	England	Bristol Hippodrome
19 November 1973	Portsmouth	England	Portsmouth Guildhall
20 November 1973	London	England	Rainbow Theatre
21 November 1973	London	England	Rainbow Theatre
22 November 1973	London	England	Rainbow Theatre
23 November 1973	London	England	Rainbow Theatre
24 November 1973	London	England	Rainbow Theatre
25 November 1973	Oxford	England	New Theatre
26 November 1973	Leicester	England	De Montfort Hall
27 November 1973	Sheffield	England	Sheffield City Hall
28 November 1973	Manchester	England	Free Trade Hall
29 November 1973	Manchester	England	Free Trade Hall
30 November 1973	Liverpool	England	Empire Theatre
1 December 1973	Cardiff	Wales	Capitol Theatre
2 December 1973	Stoke-on-Trent	England	Trentham Gardens
3 December 1973	Birmingham	England	Birmingham Hippodrome
4 December 1973	Birmingham	England	Birmingham Hippodrome
6 December 1973	Glasgow	Scotland	Apollo Theatre
7 December 1973	Glasgow	Scotland	Apollo Theatre
8 December 1973	Newcastle	England	Newcastle City Hall
9 December 1973	Newcastle	England	Newcastle City Hall
10 December 1973	Edinburgh	Scotland	Empire Theatre
North America
7 February 1974	Gainesville	United States	University Auditorium
8 February 1974	Miami	United States	Miami Baseball Stadium
9 February 1974	Tampa	United States	Tampa Stadium
10 February 1974	Columbia	United States	Carolina Coliseum
11 February 1974	Atlanta	United States	Alexander Memorial Coliseum
12 February 1974	Roanoke	United States	Roanoke Civic Center
13 February 1974	Baltimore	United States	Baltimore Civic Center
14 February 1974	Uniondale	United States	Nassau Coliseum
15 February 1974	New Haven	United States	New Haven Coliseum
16 February 1974	Philadelphia	United States	The Spectrum
18 February 1974	New York City	United States	Madison Square Garden
20 February 1974	New York City	United States	Madison Square Garden
21 February 1974	Pittsburgh	United States	Civic Arena
22 February 1974	Toronto	Canada	Maple Leaf Gardens
23 February 1974	Binghamton	United States	Broome County Veterans Memorial Arena
24 February 1974	Ithaca	United States	Barton Hall
25 February 1974	Montreal	Canada	Montreal Forum
26 February 1974	Boston	United States	Boston Garden
27 February 1974	Detroit	United States	Cobo Arena
28 February 1974	Detroit	United States	Cobo Arena
1 March 1974	Hershey	United States	Hersheypark Arena
2 March 1974	Louisville	United States	Louisville Gardens
3 March 1974	Cincinnati	United States	Cincinnati Gardens
5 March 1974	Bloomington	United States	Metropolitan Sports Center
6 March 1974	Chicago	United States	International Amphitheatre
7 March 1974	Chicago	United States	International Amphitheatre
8 March 1974	St. Louis	United States	Kiel Auditorium
10 March 1974	Memphis	United States	Cook Convention Center
11 March 1974	Oklahoma City	United States	Fairgrounds Arena
12 March 1974	Wichita	United States	Century II Convention Hall
13 March 1974	Denver	United States	Denver Coliseum
14 March 1974	Albuquerque	United States	The Pit
15 March 1974	San Francisco	United States	Winterland
16 March 1974	San Francisco	United States	Winterland
17 March 1974	Sacramento	United States	Memorial Auditorium
18 March 1974	Inglewood	United States	Los Angeles Forum
19 March 1974	Long Beach	United States	Long Beach Arena
20 March 1974	Fresno	United States	Selland Arena
21 March 1974	San Diego	United States	San Diego Sports Arena
23 March 1974	San Antonio	United States	San Antonio Civic Center
24 March 1974	Baton Rouge	United States	LSU Assembly Center
25 March 1974	Dallas	United States	Dallas Convention Center
Europe
11 April 1974	Frankfurt	West Germany	Messegelände Halle
12 April 1974	Munich	West Germany	Olympiahalle
13 April 1974	Munich	West Germany	Olympiahalle
14 April 1974	Ludwigshafen	West Germany	Friedrich-Ebert-Halle
15 April 1974	Stuttgart	West Germany	Neue Messhalle
16 April 1974	Dortmund	West Germany	Westfalenhalle
17 April 1974	Rotterdam	Netherlands	Rotterdam Ahoy
19 April 1974	Paris	France	Palais des Sports de Paris
21 April 1974	Zürich	Switzerland	Hallenstadion
23 April 1974	Rome	Italy	Palazzo dello Sport

== Relayer Tour ==
Relayer Tour
- World tour by Yes
- Location: North America; Europe
- Associated album: Relayer
- Start date: 8 November 1974
- End date: 25 July 1975
- Legs: 3
- No. of shows: 88

Band:

- Jon Anderson
- Steve Howe
- Chris Squire
- Patrick Moraz
- Alan White

Setlist:

- "Sound Chaser" (Anderson, Squire, Howe, White, Moraz)
- "Close to the Edge" (Anderson, Howe)
- "To Be Over" (Anderson, Squire, Howe, White, Moraz)
- "The Gates of Delirium" (Anderson, Squire, Howe, White, Moraz)
- "I've Seen All Good People" (Anderson) (Added starting on 15 April 1975, "Your Move" section only)
- "Mood for a Day" (Howe) (Added starting on 15 April 1975)
- "Long Distance Runaround" (Anderson) (Added starting on 15 April 1975)
- Patrick Moraz keyboard solo (Added starting on 15 April 1975)
- "Clap" (Howe) (Added starting on 15 April 1975)
- "And You and I" (Anderson, Squire, Bruford, Howe)
- "Ritual (Nous Sommes du Soleil)" (Anderson, Squire, Howe, Wakeman, White)
- "Siberian Khatru" (Anderson, Howe, Wakeman) (Dropped after 18 November 1974)
- "Roundabout" (Anderson, Howe)
- "Sweet Dreams" (Anderson, Foster) (Added starting on 15 April 1975)

Other songs played a few times were:

- "Leaves of Green" (Anderson, Squire, Howe, Wakeman, White) (Played on 23 August 1975)
- "South Side of the Sky" (Anderson, Squire) (Played on 5 and 17 December 1974)
- "Yours Is No Disgrace" (Anderson, Squire, Howe, Kaye, Bruford) (Played on 10 May and 9 July 1975)
- "Starship Trooper" (Anderson, Squire, Howe) (Played on 22, 23, 24, and 25 July 1975)
- "High Vibration" (Anderson, Howe) (early version of "Awaken") (Played on 21 July and 23 August 1975)

Covers:

- "Heigh Ho" (Churchill, Morey) originally from the 1937 film Snow White and the Seven Dwarves (Played on 25 June 1975)
- "I'm Down" (Beatles song) (Played on 19 July 1975)
- "Don't Be Cruel" (Elvis song) (Played on 6 July 1975)

Date	City	Country	Venue
North America
8 November 1974	Columbus	United States	St. John's Arena
10 November 1974	Cincinnati	United States	Cincinnati Gardens
13 November 1974	Madison	United States	Dane County Coliseum
14 November 1974	Notre Dame	United States	Edmund P. Joyce Center
15 November 1974	Indianapolis	United States	Indiana Convention Center
16 November 1974	Normal	United States	Horton Fieldhouse
17 November 1974	St. Louis	United States	Kiel Auditorium
18 November 1974	Detroit	United States	Cobo Arena
20 November 1974	New York City	United States	Madison Square Garden
21 November 1974	Buffalo	United States	Buffalo Memorial Auditorium
22 November 1974	Richfield	United States	Richfield Coliseum
23 November 1974	Charleston	United States	Charleston Civic Center
24 November 1974	Greensboro	United States	Greensboro Coliseum
25 November 1974	Knoxville	United States	Knoxville Civic Coliseum
28 November 1974	Miami	United States	Miami Jai-Alai Fronton
29 November 1974	Lakeland	United States	Lakeland Civic Center
30 November 1974	Atlanta	United States	Omni Coliseum
1 December 1974	Baton Rouge	United States	LSU Assembly Center
2 December 1974	Houston	United States	Astrodome
4 December 1974	Fort Worth	United States	Tarrant County Convention Center
5 December 1974	Tulsa	United States	Tulsa Assembly Center
6 December 1974	Lawrence	United States	Allen Fieldhouse
7 December 1974	Iowa City	United States	Iowa Field House
8 December 1974	Louisville	United States	Louisville Gardens
10 December 1974	New Haven	United States	New Haven Coliseum
11 December 1974	Boston	United States	Boston Garden
12 December 1974	Baltimore	United States	Baltimore Civic Center
13 December 1974	Pittsburgh	United States	Civic Arena
14 December 1974	Philadelphia	United States	The Spectrum
15 December 1974	Cincinnati	United States	Cincinnati Gardens
16 December 1974	Chicago	United States	International Amphitheatre
17 December 1974	Saint Paul	United States	St. Paul Civic Center
UK
15 April 1975	Newcastle	England	Newcastle City Hall
16 April 1975	Newcastle	England	Newcastle City Hall
17 April 1975	Newcastle	England	Newcastle City Hall
18 April 1975	Glasgow	Scotland	Apollo Theatre
19 April 1975	Glasgow	Scotland	Apollo Theatre
20 April 1975	Edinburgh	Scotland	Usher Hall
21 April 1975	Edinburgh	Scotland	Usher Hall
23 April 1975	Preston	England	Preston Guild Hall
24 April 1975	Leicester	England	De Montfort Hall
25 April 1975	Leicester	England	De Montfort Hall
27 April 1975	Liverpool	England	Empire Theatre
28 April 1975	Liverpool	England	Empire Theatre
29 April 1975	Manchester	England	Palace Theatre
30 April 1975	Manchester	England	Palace Theatre
2 May 1975	Cardiff	Wales	Capitol Theatre
3 May 1975	Cardiff	Wales	Capitol Theatre
5 May 1975	Bristol	England	Colston Hall
6 May 1975	Bristol	England	Colston Hall
7 May 1975	Bristol	England	Colston Hall
10 May 1975	London	England	Queen's Park Rangers Stadium
12 May 1975	Southampton	England	Gaumont Theatre
13 May 1975	Southampton	England	Gaumont Theatre
14 May 1975	Southampton	England	Gaumont Theatre
17 May 1975	Stoke-on-Trent	England	Victoria Ground
North America
17 June 1975	Denver	United States	Denver Coliseum
18 June 1975	Salt Lake City	United States	Salt Palace
19 June 1975	Las Vegas	United States	Las Vegas Convention Center
20 June 1975	Tucson	United States	Tucson Convention Center
21 June 1975	Los Angeles	United States	Hollywood Bowl
22 June 1975	Tempe	United States	Diablo Stadium / Feyline Fields
23 June 1975	Long Beach	United States	Long Beach Arena
24 June 1975	San Diego	United States	San Diego Sports Arena
25 June 1975	Daly City	United States	Cow Palace
27 June 1975	Vancouver	Canada	Pacific Coliseum
28 June 1975	Seattle	United States	Seattle Center Coliseum
29 June 1975	Portland	United States	Memorial Coliseum
2 July 1975	Lincoln	United States	Pershing Municipal Auditorium
3 July 1975	Kansas City	United States	Municipal Auditorium
4 July 1975	Chicago	United States	Chicago Stadium
5 July 1975	Evansville	United States	Roberts Municipal Stadium
6 July 1975	Memphis	United States	Mid-South Coliseum
~~7 July 1975~~	Little Rock	United States	Barton Coliseum
8 July 1975	Nashville	United States	Municipal Auditorium
9 July 1975	Edwardsville	United States	Mississippi River Festival
10 July 1975	Indianapolis	United States	Market Square Arena
11 July 1975	Cleveland	United States	Municipal Stadium (World Series of Rock)
12 July 1975	Orchard Park	United States	Rich Stadium
15 July 1975	Fort Wayne	United States	Allen County War Memorial Coliseum
16 July 1975	Milwaukee	United States	MECCA Arena
18 July 1975	Montreal	Canada	Montreal Forum
19 July 1975	Toronto	Canada	Maple Leaf Gardens
20 July 1975	Ypsilanti	United States	Rynearson Stadium
21 July 1975	Philadelphia	United States	The Spectrum
22 July 1975	Philadelphia	United States	The Spectrum
23 July 1975	Providence	United States	Providence Civic Center
24 July 1975	Landover	United States	Capital Centre
25 July 1975	Jersey City	United States	Roosevelt Stadium
Reading Festival
23 August 1975	Reading	England	Reading Rock Festival

== 1976 Solo Albums Tour ==
1976 Solo Albums Tour
- World tour by Yes
- Location: North America
- Start date: 28 May 1976
- End date: 22 August 1976
- Legs: 2
- No. of shows: 56

Band:

- Jon Anderson
- Steve Howe
- Chris Squire
- Patrick Moraz
- Alan White

Setlist:

- "Apocalypse" (Anderson, Squire, Howe, Bruford)
- "Siberian Khatru" (Anderson, Howe, Wakeman)
- "Sound Chaser" (Anderson, Squire, Howe, White, Moraz)
- "I've Seen All Good People" (Anderson, Squire)
- "Hold Out Your Hand/You by My Side" (Squire) from Chris Squire's 1975 solo album Fish Out of Water (Dropped after 6 June 1976)
- "Leaves of Green" (Anderson, Squire, Howe, Wakeman, White) (Between 1 June 1976 and 8 June 1976)
- "On Wings of Gold" based on "Winter" by Vivaldi (Added on 22 June 1976)
- "Break Away from It All" (Howe) from Steve Howe's 1975 solo album Beginnings (Replaced by "Clap" (Howe) after 31 May 1976)
- "Ram" (Howe) from Beginnings (Dropped after 31 May 1976)
- "Beginnings" (Howe) from Beginnings (Dropped after 31 May 1976)
- Alan White solo (White) including "One Way Rag" (Colin Gibson, Kenny Craddock) from his 1976 solo album Ramshackled (Dropped after 31 May 1976)
- "Song of Innocence" (William Blake, Pete Kirtley) from Ramshackled (Dropped after 6 June 1976)
- "Cachaça (Baião)" (Moraz) from Patrick Moraz's 1976 solo album The Story of I (Dropped after 31 May 1976)
- "Long Distance Runaround" (Anderson) (Added on 1 June 1976)
- "Grand Canyon Suite" (Moraz keyboard solo) (Added on 1 June 1976)
- Harp solo
- "Heart of the Sunrise" (Anderson, Squire, Bruford)
- "Ritual (Nous Sommes du Soleil)" (Anderson, Squire, Howe, Wakeman, White) (Added on 8 June 1976)
- "The Gates of Delirium" (Anderson, Howe, Moraz, Squire, White)
- "Roundabout" (Anderson, Howe)
- "Sweet Dreams" (Anderson, Foster) (Dropped after 8 June 1976)

Also played occasionally were:

- "Ocean Song" (Anderson) from Jon Anderson's 1976 solo album Olias of Sunhillow (Recording preceded "Apocalypse" on 26 June 1976)
- "Wonderous Stories" (Anderson) (Played on 6 June 1976)
- "Close to the Edge" (Anderson, Howe) (Replaced "Ritual" on 23 July and 28 July 1976)
- "In the Midnight Hour" (Wilson Pickett, Steve Cropper) (Played on 3 August 1976)
- "Starship Trooper" (Anderson, Squire, Howe) (Played on 8, 13, 16, 19, 20, and 21 June 1976, 17, 20, 28, 30, and 31 July 1976, and 7 August 1976)
- "The Remembering (High the Memory)" (Anderson, Howe, Squire, Wakeman, White) (Replaced "The Gates of Delirium" on 30 July and 31 July 1976)
- "I'm Down" (Lennon, McCartney) originally by the Beatles in 1965 (Played on 3, 6, 12, 17, 18, and 22 June 1976, 18, 20, 27, and 28 July 1976, and 1 August 1976)
- "Yours Is No Disgrace" (Anderson, Squire, Howe, Bruford, Kaye) (Played on 25 June 1976)
- "Every Little Thing" (Lennon, McCartney) (Played on 11 August 1976)

Date	City	Country	Venue
North America
28 May 1976	Roanoke	United States	Roanoke Civic Center
29 May 1976	Hampton	United States	Hampton Coliseum
30 May 1976	Charleston	United States	Charleston Civic Center
31 May 1976	Johnson City	United States	Freedom Hall Civic Center
1 June 1976	Nashville	United States	Nashville Municipal Auditorium
2 June 1976	Birmingham	United States	Boutwell Auditorium
3 June 1976	Atlanta	United States	Omni Coliseum
4 June 1976	Memphis	United States	Mid-South Coliseum
5 June 1976	Jackson	United States	Mississippi Coliseum
6 June 1976	Huntsville	United States	Von Braun Civic Center
8 June 1976	Cincinnati	United States	Riverfront Coliseum
9 June 1976	Binghamton	United States	Broome County Veterans Memorial Arena
10 June 1976	Providence	United States	Providence Civic Center
12 June 1976	Philadelphia	United States	John F. Kennedy Stadium
13 June 1976	Washington, D.C.	United States	Robert F. Kennedy Stadium
16 June 1976	Uniondale	United States	Nassau Coliseum
17 June 1976	Jersey City	United States	Roosevelt Stadium
18 June 1976	Boston	United States	Boston Garden
19 June 1976	Hartford	United States	Colt Park
20 June 1976	Rochester	United States	Rochester Community War Memorial
21 June 1976	Kalamazoo	United States	Wings Stadium
22 June 1976	Pittsburgh	United States	Civic Arena
24 June 1976	Columbia	United States	Carolina Coliseum
25 June 1976	Savannah	United States	Savannah Civic Center
26 June 1976	Tampa	United States	Tampa Stadium
North America
17 July 1976	Anaheim	United States	Anaheim Stadium
18 July 1976	San Diego	United States	Balboa Stadium
20 July 1976	Daly City	United States	Cow Palace
22 July 1976	Vancouver	Canada	Pacific Coliseum
23 July 1976	Seattle	United States	Seattle Center Coliseum
24 July 1976	Spokane	United States	Spokane Coliseum
25 July 1976	Portland	United States	Memorial Coliseum
27 July 1976	Salt Lake City	United States	Salt Palace
28 July 1976	Denver	United States	Auditorium Arena
30 July 1976	El Paso	United States	El Paso County Coliseum
31 July 1976	Phoenix	United States	Veterans Memorial Coliseum
1 August 1976	Las Vegas	United States	Aladdin Theater
3 August 1976	Fresno	United States	Selland Arena
4 August 1976	Corpus Christi	United States	Memorial Coliseum
6 August 1976	University Park	United States	Moody Coliseum
7 August 1976	San Antonio	United States	Municipal Auditorium
8 August 1976	Houston	United States	Hofheinz Pavilion
9 August 1976	Lincoln	United States	Pershing Center
10 August 1976	Oklahoma City	United States	The Myriad
11 August 1976	St. Louis	United States	Kiel Auditorium
12 August 1976	Louisville	United States	Louisville Gardens
13 August 1976	Columbus	United States	St. John Arena
14 August 1976	Stickney/ Cicero	United States	Hawthorne Race Course
15 August 1976	Saint Paul	United States	St. Paul Civic Center
16 August 1976	Milwaukee	United States	MECCA Arena
17 August 1976	Detroit	United States	Cobo Arena
18 August 1976	Detroit	United States	Cobo Arena
19 August 1976	Detroit	United States	Cobo Arena
20 August 1976	Toledo	United States	Toledo Sports Arena
21 August 1976	Richfield	United States	Richfield Coliseum
22 August 1976	Fort Wayne	United States	Allen County War Memorial Coliseum
23 August 1976	Rochester	United States	Rochester Community War Memorial

=== Box office score data ===
List of box office score data with date, city, venue, attendance, gross
Date (1976)	City	Venue	Attendance	Gross
1 June	Nashville, United States	Nashville Municipal Auditorium	9,050	$50,800
2 June	Birmingham, United States	Boutwell Auditorium	5,000 / 5,000	$30,000
6 June	Huntsville, United States	Von Braun Civic Center	4,900	$28,100
8 June	Cincinnati, United States	Riverfront Coliseum	15,338	$92,387
17 June	Jersey City, United States	Roosevelt Stadium	35,000 / 35,000	$262,500
19 June	Hartford, United States	Colt Park	29,097	$218,317
21 June	Kalamazoo, United States	Wings Stadium	8,000	$47,000
22 June	Pittsburgh, United States	Civic Arena	12,613	$75,000
26 June	Tampa, United States	Tampa Stadium	21,000	$150,551
17 July	Anaheim, United States	Anaheim Stadium	55,000	$550,000
18 July	San Diego, United States	Balboa Stadium	35,000	$350,000
20 July	Daly City, United States	Cow Palace	14,500 / 14,500	$94,250
22 July	Vancouver, Canada	Pacific Coliseum	11,901	$73,555
23 July	Seattle, United States	Seattle Center Coliseum	15,000 / 15,000	$97,435
24 July	Spokane, United States	Spokane Coliseum	6,457 / 6,457	$40,270
25 July	Portland, United States	Memorial Coliseum	7,871	$51,741
3 August	Fresno, United States	Selland Arena	5,000	$29,099
11 August	St. Louis, United States	Kiel Auditorium	10,586 / 10,586	$67,930
TOTAL			301,313	$2,308,935

== Going for the One Tour ==
Going for the One Tour
- World tour by Yes
- Location: North America; Europe
- Associated album: Going for the One
- Start date: 30 July 1977
- End date: 6 December 1977
- Legs: 2
- No. of shows: 90 (92 scheduled)

Band:

- Jon Anderson
- Steve Howe
- Chris Squire
- Rick Wakeman
- Alan White

Setlist:

- "Parallels" (Squire)
- "I've Seen All Good People" (Anderson, Squire)
- "Close to the Edge" (Anderson, Howe)
- "Wonderous Stories"
- "Turn of the Century" (Anderson, Howe, White)
- "Count Your Blessings" (Anderson) (Between 17 and 23 September 1977)
- "And You and I" (Anderson, Squire, Howe, Bruford)
- "Ram" (Howe) (Dropped after 31 July 1977)
- "Going for the One" (Added on 22 August 1977)
- "Flight Jam" (Anderson)
- "Awaken" (Anderson, Howe)
- "Roundabout" (Anderson, Howe)
- "Starship Trooper" (Anderson, Squire, Howe) or "Yours Is No Disgrace" (Anderson, Squire, Howe, Kaye, Bruford), sometimes both

Also played occasionally were:

- "Colours of the Rainbow" (Bricusse, Newley) (Played on 30, 31 July 1977, 1, 2, 3, 5, 6, 7, 12, 13, 14, 15 August 1977, 17, 18, 19, 21, 22, 23 September, 12 November 1977, and 5 December 1977)
- "Siberian Khatru" (Anderson, Howe, Wakeman) (Replaced "Awaken" on 31 August 1977)
- "Leaves of Green" (Anderson, Howe, Squire, Wakeman, White) (On 25 and 26 August 1977)
- "Ritual (Nous Sommes du Soleil)" (Anderson, Squire, Howe, Wakeman, White) (Played on 21 November 1977, 2, 4, 5, and 6 December 1977)
- "Bremen Boogie" (Replaced Tour Song on 27 November 1977)

Covers:

- "In the Midnight Hour" (Picket, Cropper) (Played on 23 September 1977)
- "Ram" (Played on 30 and 31 July 1977)
- "Beautiful Lang" (Played on 10 August and 26 September 1977)
- "

Date	City	Country	Venue
North America
30 July 1977	Toledo	United States	Toledo Sports Arena
31 July 1977	Wheeling	United States	Wheeling Civic Center
1 August 1977	Hampton	United States	Hampton Coliseum
2 August 1977	Philadelphia	United States	Spectrum
3 August 1977	Philadelphia	United States	Spectrum
5 August 1977	New York City	United States	Madison Square Garden
6 August 1977	New York City	United States	Madison Square Garden
7 August 1977	New York City	United States	Madison Square Garden
8 August 1977	New Haven	United States	New Haven Coliseum
9 August 1977	New Haven	United States	New Haven Coliseum
10 August 1977	Springfield	United States	Springfield Civic Center
12 August 1977	Boston	United States	Boston Garden
13 August 1977	Boston	United States	Boston Garden
14 August 1977	Portland	United States	Cumberland County Civic Center
15 August 1977	Providence	United States	Providence Civic Center
16 August 1977	Landover	United States	Capital Centre
17 August 1977	Richfield	United States	Richfield Coliseum
18 August 1977	Kalamazoo	United States	Wings Stadium
19 August 1977	Pittsburgh	United States	Civic Arena
20 August 1977	Buffalo	United States	Rich Stadium
21 August 1977	Rochester	United States	Rochester Community War Memorial
22 August 1977	Detroit	United States	Cobo Arena
23 August 1977	Detroit	United States	Cobo Arena
25 August 1977	Atlanta	United States	Omni Coliseum
26 August 1977	Birmingham	United States	BJCC Coliseum
27 August 1977	Nashville	United States	Nashville Municipal Auditorium
28 August 1977	Louisville	United States	Freedom Hall
29 August 1977	Cincinnati	United States	Riverfront Coliseum
30 August 1977	Indianapolis	United States	Market Square Arena
31 August 1977	Madison	United States	Dane County Coliseum
1 September 1977	Milwaukee	United States	MECCA Arena
2 September 1977	Chicago	United States	International Amphitheatre
3 September 1977	Chicago	United States	International Amphitheatre
17 September 1977	Vancouver	Canada	Pacific Coliseum
18 September 1977	Seattle	United States	Seattle Center Coliseum
19 September 1977	Seattle	United States	Seattle Center Coliseum
20 September 1977	Portland	United States	Memorial Coliseum
21 September 1977	Oakland	United States	Oakland–Alameda County Coliseum Arena
22 September 1977	Oakland	United States	Oakland–Alameda County Coliseum Arena
23 September 1977	Inglewood	United States	The Forum
24 September 1977	Inglewood	United States	The Forum
25 September 1977	San Diego	United States	San Diego Sports Arena
26 September 1977	Long Beach	United States	Long Beach Arena
27 September 1977	Las Vegas	United States	Aladdin Theater
29 September 1977	El Paso	United States	El Paso County Coliseum
30 September 1977	Abilene	United States	Civic Center
1 October 1977	Houston	United States	Sam Houston Coliseum
2 October 1977	University Park	United States	Moody Coliseum
3 October 1977	Oklahoma City	United States	The Myriad
4 October 1977	St. Louis	United States	Kiel Auditorium
5 October 1977	St. Louis	United States	Kiel Auditorium
6 October 1977	Kansas City	United States	Municipal Auditorium
7 October 1977	Memphis	United States	Mid-South Coliseum
8 October 1977	Jackson	United States	Mississippi Coliseum
9 October 1977	New Orleans	United States	Morris F.X. Jeff, Sr. Municipal Auditorium
Europe
24 October 1977	London	England	Empire Pool
25 October 1977	London	England	Empire Pool
26 October 1977	London	England	Empire Pool
27 October 1977	London	England	Empire Pool
28 October 1977	London	England	Empire Pool
29 October 1977	London	England	Empire Pool
2 November 1977	Stafford	England	New Bingley Hall
3 November 1977	Stafford	England	New Bingley Hall
4 November 1977	Stafford	England	New Bingley Hall
5 November 1977	Glasgow	Scotland	Apollo Theatre
6 November 1977	Glasgow	Scotland	Apollo Theatre
7 November 1977	Glasgow	Scotland	Apollo Theatre
8 November 1977	Glasgow	Scotland	Apollo Theatre
11 November 1977	Oslo	Norway	Ekeberghallen
12 November 1977	Gothenburg	Sweden	Scandinavium
13 November 1977	Copenhagen	Denmark	Falkoner Teatret
14 November 1977	Hanover	West Germany	Sporthalle Am Stadion
15 November 1977	Dortmund	West Germany	Westfalenhallen
16 November 1977	Düsseldorf	West Germany	Philipshalle
18 November 1977	Frankfurt	West Germany	Festhalle
19 November 1977	Nuremberg	West Germany	Messehalle
20 November 1977	Zürich	Switzerland	Hallenstadion
21 November 1977	Heidelberg	West Germany	Stadthalle
23 November 1977	Munich	West Germany	Olympiahalle
24 November 1977	Rotterdam	Netherlands	Rotterdam Ahoy
25 November 1977	Rotterdam	Netherlands	Rotterdam Ahoy
26 November 1977	Antwerp	Belgium	Sportpaleis Antwerp
27 November 1977	Bremen	West Germany	Stadthalle
28 November 1977	Berlin	West Germany	Deutschlandhalle
29 November 1977	Cologne	West Germany	Sporthalle
1 December 1977	Esslingen	West Germany	Eberhard-Bauer-Halle
2 December 1977	Colmar	France	Parc des Expositions
4 December 1977	Lyon	France	Palais des Sports de Gerland
5 December 1977	Paris	France	Pavillon de Paris
6 December 1977	Paris	France	Pavillon de Paris
~~7 December 1977~~	Madrid	Spain	Unknown
~~8 December 1977~~	Madrid	Spain	Unknown

=== Box office score data ===
List of box office score data with date, city, venue, attendance, gross
Date (1977)	City	Venue	Attendance	Gross
31 July	Wheeling, United States	Wheeling Civic Center	5,353 / 5,353	$36,403
2 August	Philadelphia, United States	Spectrum	34,000 / 34,000	$264,909
3 August	Philadelphia, United States	Spectrum	34,000 / 34,000	$264,909
8 August	New Haven, United States	New Haven Coliseum	21,019 / 21,019	$169,111
9 August	New Haven, United States	New Haven Coliseum	21,019 / 21,019	$169,111
10 August	Springfield, United States	Springfield Civic Center	10,400 / 10,400	$78,225
12 August	Boston, United States	Boston Garden	28,900	$241,500
13 August	Boston, United States	Boston Garden	28,900	$241,500
16 August	Landover, United States	Capital Centre	16,500	$116,427
19 August	Pittsburgh, United States	Civic Arena	16,480 / 16,480	$108,935
25 August	Atlanta, United States	Omni Coliseum	11,407	$78,521
26 August	Birmingham, United States	BJCC Coliseum	9,500	$61,809
27 August	Nashville, United States	Nashville Municipal Auditorium	9,900 / 9,900	$53,180
30 August	Indianapolis, United States	Market Square Arena	11,757	$78,706
1 September	Milwaukee, United States	MECCA Arena	8,800	$67,600
2 September	Chicago, United States	International Amphitheatre	22,622	$185,872
3 September	Chicago, United States	International Amphitheatre	22,622	$185,872
17 September	Vancouver, Canada	Pacific Coliseum	17,126	$130,058
18 September	Seattle, United States	Seattle Center Coliseum	14,998 / 14,998	$112,485
20 September	Portland, United States	Memorial Coliseum	8,849	$67,677
21 September	Oakland, United States	Oakland–Alameda County Coliseum Arena	21,401	$169,276
22 September	Oakland, United States	Oakland–Alameda County Coliseum Arena	21,401	$169,276
23 September	Inglewood, United States	The Forum	26,134 / 26,134	$216,744
24 September	Inglewood, United States	The Forum	26,134 / 26,134	$216,744
25 September	San Diego, United States	San Diego Sports Arena	10,321	$83,941
29 September	El Paso, United States	El Paso County Coliseum	6,352	$41,481
4 October	St. Louis, United States	Kiel Auditorium	19,766	$127,611
5 October	St. Louis, United States	Kiel Auditorium	19,766	$127,611
6 October	Kansas City, United States	Municipal Auditorium	10,902 / 10,902	$76,314
7 October	Memphis, United States	Mid-South Coliseum	10,381	$70,817
8 October	Jackson, United States	Mississippi Coliseum	10,000 / 10,000	$60,000
TOTAL			332,411	$2,644,422

== Tormato Tour ==
Tormato Tour
- World tour by Yes
- Location: North America; Europe
- Associated album: Tormato
- Start date: 28 August 1978
- End date: 30 June 1979
- Legs: 3
- No. of shows: 101 (104 scheduled)

Band:

- Jon Anderson
- Steve Howe
- Chris Squire
- Rick Wakeman
- Alan White

Setlist:

- "Siberian Khatru" (Anderson, Howe, Wakeman)
- "Heart of the Sunrise" (Anderson, Squire, Bruford)
- "Future Times/Rejoice" (Anderson, Squire, Howe, Wakeman, White)
- "Circus of Heaven" (Anderson)
- "The Big Medley" (Anderson, Squire, Foster)
1. "Time and a Word"
2. "Long Distance Runaround"
3. "Survival"
4. "The Fish (Schindleria Praematurus)"
5. "Perpetual Change"
6. "Soon"
- "Release, Release" (Anderson, White, Squire) (Dropped after 3 September 1978)
- "Don't Kill the Whale" (Anderson, Squire) (Dropped after 18 April 1979)
- "Clap" (Howe)
- "Arriving UFO" (Anderson, Howe, Wakeman) (Added on 18 June 1979)
- "On the Silent Wings of Freedom" (Anderson, Squire) (Replaced by "And You and I" (Anderson, Howe, Bruford, Squire) starting on 20 April 1979)
- Wakeman solo (Wakeman)
- "Flight Jam" (Anderson)
- "Awaken" (Anderson, Howe)
- "Leaves of Green" (Anderson, Squire, Howe, Wakeman, White) (Added on 18 June 1979)
- "I've Seen All Good People" (Anderson, Squire)
- "Roundabout" (Anderson, Squire)

Other songs occasionally played were:

- "Madrigal" (Anderson, Wakeman)
- "Close to the Edge" (Anderson, Howe) (Played on 20, 21, and 22 April 1979)
- "Going for the One" (Played on 29 August 1978)
- "In the Midnight Hour" (Pickett, Cropper) (Played on 17 September 1978)
- "Your Move" (Played on 26 April 1979)
- "Vevey" (Played on 29 August 1978)
- "Release, Release" (Played on 28, 29, 30, 31 August 1978, 1, 2 September 1978)
- "Kansas City Witch" (Played on 27, 28, 29, 30 September 1978, 1, 3, 4 October 1978)
- "Parallels" (Squire) (Played on 28, 29, 30, 31 August 1978, 3, 4, 6, 7, 8 September 1978)

Date	City	Country	Venue	Tickets sold / available	Revenue
North America
28 August 1978	Rochester	United States	Rochester Community War Memorial	—N/a	—N/a
29 August 1978	Buffalo	United States	Buffalo Memorial Auditorium	14,337 / 14,337	
30 August 1978	Boston	United States	Boston Garden	27,774 / 31,818	
31 August 1978	Boston	United States	Boston Garden	27,774 / 31,818	
1 September 1978	Providence	United States	Providence Civic Center	11,075 / 11,075	
2 September 1978	Springfield	United States	Springfield Civic Center	—N/a	—N/a
3 September 1978	New Haven	United States	New Haven Coliseum	—N/a	—N/a
4 September 1978	New Haven	United States	New Haven Coliseum	—N/a	—N/a
6 September 1978	New York City	United States	Madison Square Garden	69,593 / 72,000	$822,744
7 September 1978	New York City	United States	Madison Square Garden	69,593 / 72,000	$822,744
8 September 1978	New York City	United States	Madison Square Garden	69,593 / 72,000	$822,744
9 September 1978	New York City	United States	Madison Square Garden	69,593 / 72,000	$822,744
10 September 1978	Landover	United States	Capital Centre	18,787 / 18,787	
11 September 1978	Philadelphia	United States	The Spectrum	—N/a	—N/a
12 September 1978	Philadelphia	United States	The Spectrum	—N/a	—N/a
13 September 1978	Hampton	United States	Hampton Coliseum	—N/a	—N/a
14 September 1978	Greensboro	United States	Greensboro Coliseum	15,886 / 15,886	
16 September 1978	Nashville	United States	Municipal Auditorium	9,442 / 9,442	
17 September 1978	Memphis	United States	Mid-South Coliseum	10,045 / 12,348	
19 September 1978	Richfield	United States	Richfield Coliseum	—N/a	—N/a
20 September 1978	Cincinnati	United States	Riverfront Coliseum	—N/a	—N/a
21 September 1978	Detroit	United States	Olympia Stadium	—N/a	—N/a
22 September 1978	Notre Dame	United States	Edmund P. Joyce Center	11,345 / 11,345	
23 September 1978	Chicago	United States	International Amphitheatre	18,000 / 18,000	$212,800
24 September 1978	Chicago	United States	International Amphitheatre	18,000 / 18,000	$212,800
25 September 1978	Indianapolis	United States	Market Square Arena	15,751 / 16,570	
27 September 1978	Kansas City	United States	Kemper Arena	14,855 / 17,513	
28 September 1978	St. Louis	United States	Checkerdome	12,128 / 14,778	
29 September 1978	Tulsa	United States	Tulsa Convention Center	8,400 / 8,400	
30 September 1978	Houston	United States	Sam Houston Coliseum	8,246 / 9,000	
1 October 1978	Fort Worth	United States	Tarrant County Convention Center	—N/a	—N/a
3 October 1978	Las Cruces	United States	Pan American Center	—N/a	—N/a
4 October 1978	Tempe	United States	ASU Activity Center	10,754 / 10,754	
5 October 1978	Inglewood	United States	The Forum	30,976 / 31,246	
6 October 1978	Inglewood	United States	The Forum	30,976 / 31,246	
7 October 1978	Oakland	United States	Oakland–Alameda County Coliseum Arena	—N/a	—N/a
8 October 1978	Oakland	United States	Oakland–Alameda County Coliseum Arena	—N/a	—N/a
United Kingdom
26 October 1978	London	England	Empire Pool	—N/a	—N/a
27 October 1978	London	England	Empire Pool	—N/a	—N/a
28 October 1978 (matinee)	London	England	Empire Pool	—N/a	—N/a
28 October 1978 (evening)	London	England	Empire Pool	—N/a	—N/a
North America
9 April 1979	Kalamazoo	United States	Wings Stadium	5,000 / 5,000	
10 April 1979	Bloomington	United States	Assembly Hall	13,457 / 13,457	
11 April 1979	Pittsburgh	United States	Civic Arena	13,881 / 16,000	$164,104
12 April 1979	Dayton	United States	University of Dayton Arena	12,345 / 12,345	
13 April 1979	Louisville	United States	Freedom Hall	12,366 / 15,749	
14 April 1979	Huntington	United States	Huntington Civic Center	7,500 / 7,500	
16 April 1979	Ottawa	Canada	Ottawa Civic Centre	9,000 / 9,000	
17 April 1979	Montreal	Canada	Montreal Forum	16,452 / 17,000	
18 April 1979	Quebec City	Canada	Colisée de Québec	14,348 / 15,000	
20 April 1979	Toronto	Canada	Maple Leaf Gardens	17,019 / 17,500	$201,202
21 April 1979	Detroit	United States	Olympia Stadium	12,016 / 12,950	
22 April 1979	West Lafayette	United States	Mackey Arena	—N/a	—N/a
23 April 1979	Champaign	United States	Assembly Hall	—N/a	—N/a
24 April 1979	Omaha	United States	Omaha Civic Auditorium	8,917 / 10,000	$105,418
25 April 1979	Cedar Rapids	United States	Five Seasons Center	8,600 / 8,600	
26 April 1979	Milwaukee	United States	MECCA Arena	9,237 / 11,069	
27 April 1979	Madison	United States	Dane County Coliseum	7,587 / 9,900	
28 April 1979	Bloomington	United States	Metropolitan Sports Center	10,911 / 15,000	
29 April 1979	Duluth	United States	Duluth Entertainment Convention Center	5,324 / 5,324	
30 April 1979	Winnipeg	Canada	Winnipeg Arena	—N/a	—N/a
1 May 1979	Regina	Canada	Brandt Centre	—N/a	—N/a
2 May 1979	Edmonton	Canada	Northlands Coliseum	—N/a	—N/a
3 May 1979	Calgary	Canada	Calgary Corral	—N/a	—N/a
5 May 1979	Vancouver	Canada	Pacific Coliseum	12,584 / 16,000	
6 May 1979	Spokane	United States	Spokane Veterans Memorial Arena	10,759 / 10,759	
7 May 1979	Portland	United States	Veterans Memorial Coliseum	—N/a	—N/a
8 May 1979	Seattle	United States	Seattle Center Coliseum	—N/a	—N/a
24 May 1979	Fresno	United States	Selland Arena	—N/a	—N/a
25 May 1979	Long Beach	United States	Long Beach Arena	—N/a	—N/a
26 May 1979	Long Beach	United States	Long Beach Arena	—N/a	—N/a
27 May 1979	San Diego	United States	San Diego Sports Arena	12,920 / 12,920	
29 May 1979	Denver	United States	McNichols Sports Arena	—N/a	—N/a
30 May 1979	Amarillo	United States	Amarillo Civic Center	—N/a	—N/a
31 May 1979	Fort Worth	United States	Tarrant County Convention Center	—N/a	—N/a
1 June 1979	Austin	United States	Frank Erwin Center	12,008 / 14,595	
3 June 1979	Houston	United States	Sam Houston Coliseum	17,874 / 18,000	
4 June 1979	Houston	United States	Sam Houston Coliseum	17,874 / 18,000	
5 June 1979	Oklahoma City	United States	The Myriad	—N/a	—N/a
~~6 June 1979~~	~~Kansas City~~	United States	~~Kemper Arena~~ (Note: This concert was canceled after the Kemper Arena's roof collapsed on 4 June 1979.)	—N/a	—N/a
7 June 1979	St. Louis	United States	The Checkerdome	7,579 / 13,500	$89,600
8 June 1979	Chicago	United States	International Amphitheatre	25,841 / 27,000	$305,498
9 June 1979	Chicago	United States	International Amphitheatre	25,841 / 27,000	$305,498
10 June 1979	Chicago	United States	International Amphitheatre	25,841 / 27,000	$305,498
12 June 1979	Uniondale	United States	Nassau Coliseum	16,732 / 16,732	$197,809
13 June 1979	New York City	United States	Madison Square Garden	54,000 / 54,000	
14 June 1979	New York City	United States	Madison Square Garden	54,000 / 54,000	
15 June 1979	New York City	United States	Madison Square Garden	54,000 / 54,000	
16 June 1979	New Haven	United States	New Haven Coliseum	—N/a	—N/a
17 June 1979	New Haven	United States	New Haven Coliseum	—N/a	—N/a
18 June 1979	Springfield	United States	Springfield Civic Center	—N/a	—N/a
19 June 1979	Boston	United States	Boston Garden	—N/a	—N/a
20 June 1979	Philadelphia	United States	The Spectrum	49,267 / 53,325	
21 June 1979	Philadelphia	United States	The Spectrum	49,267 / 53,325	
22 June 1979	Philadelphia	United States	The Spectrum	49,267 / 53,325	
23 June 1979	Lexington	United States	Rupp Arena	18,378 / 18,378	
24 June 1979	Birmingham	United States	Birmingham–Jefferson Convention Complex	—N/a	—N/a
25 June 1979	Atlanta	United States	Omni Coliseum	10,782 / 11,466	
27 June 1979	Baton Rouge	United States	Riverside Centroplex	6,457 / 8,500	
~~28 June 1979~~	~~Mobile~~	United States	~~Mobile Municipal Auditorium~~ (Note: This concert was canceled due to an ongoing truck drivers' strike in Alabama.)	—N/a	—N/a
29 June 1979	Lakeland	United States	Lakeland Civic Center	10,000 / 10,000	
30 June 1979	Pembroke Pines	United States	Hollywood Sportatorium	—N/a	—N/a

== See also ==
- List of Yes concert tours (1980s–90s)
- List of Yes concert tours (2000s–10s)
- List of Yes concert tours (2020s)
