= Come Around =

Come Around may refer to:

== Albums ==
- Come Around (Carla dal Forno album) or the title song, 2022
- Come Around (Sing It Loud album) or the title song, 2008
- Come Around, by Rob Lutes, 2021
- Come Around, by Tony Scherr, 2002
- Come Around EP, by Sing It Loud, 2008

== Songs ==
- "Come Around" (Chantay Savage song), 1999
- "Come Around" (Counting Crows song), 2008
- "Come Around" (Mental As Anything song), 1980
- "Come Around" (Papa Roach song), 2019
- "Come Around", by Christian French and Hoodie Allen, 2019
- "Come Around", by Collie Buddz from Collie Buddz, 2007
- "Come Around", by Dōs of Soul from the Nutty Professor soundtrack album, 1996
- "Come Around", by Fireworks from All I Have to Offer Is My Own Confusion, 2009
- "Come Around", by the Foreign Exchange from Connected, 2004
- "Come Around", by Matt Blxck, competed to represent Malta in the Eurovision Song Contest 2022
- "Come Around", by Skip Bifferty from Skip Bifferty, 1968
- "Come Around", by Stars Go Dim, 2009
- "Come Around", by Timebelle, 2017
- "Come Around", by Transplants from In a Warzone, 2013
- "Come Around", by M.I.A., 2007

== Other uses ==
- Come-around, a type of shot in curling
