= Carla dal Forno =

Australian musician

- dal Forno performing at the White Hotel in Salford, England, 2026

Background information
- Origin: Melbourne, Victoria, Australia
- Genres: Electropop; post-punk; ambient pop
- Occupations: Singer; songwriter; composer; multi-instrumentalist
- Instruments: Vocals; bass guitar; synthesizer; drum machine; guitar
- Years active: 2010–present
- Labels: Blackest Ever Black; Kallista
- Formerly of: Mole House; F ingers
- Partner: Sanjay Fernandes

Carla dal Forno is an Australian electropop singer, songwriter, composer, and multi-instrumentalist. Formerly of the groups Mole House (2010–2013) and F ingers (2013–2017), dal Forno has issued four solo studio albums You Know What It's Like (2016), Look Up Sharp (2019), Come Around (2022) and Confession (2026).

== Career ==
Carla dal Forno began her music career in Melbourne in 2010, playing in bands while also completing an academic degree in fine arts. She collaborated with friends Micky Zulicki and Pat Breen in a group, Mole House, which released music on Zulicki's Quemada Records and were active between 2010 and 2013. Dal Forno also released music as a member of F ingers (also known as Fingers Pty Ltd) alongside Sam Karmel and Tarquin Manek, and in the duo Tarcar with Manek. AllMusic's Paul Simpson described F ingers as creating "sparse, haunting darkwave folk with shadowy vocals, spacious acoustic guitars, fluid bass guitar, and sparingly used synthesizer."

dal Forno relocated to Berlin, Germany where she worked on her debut solo studio album in 2014. You Know What It's Like was released by London-based label Blackest Ever Black in October 2016. Her performance at London's The Islington in February 2017 was caught by Ripe's Blake Creighton, who observed "she engaged everyone through her soft, dark and subtle instrumentals and vocals. Everyone was left feeling a sense of emotional connection after each track." She hosted a monthly show on NTS Radio during 2017.

Following Blackest Ever Black's closure in 2019, dal Forno released her second solo studio album Look Up Sharp on her own Kallista Records, while living in London. By 2022 she had moved to Castlemaine, Victoria and released her third solo studio album Come Around late that year. Its title track was issued as a single in August. Simpson observed that dal Forno's solo work spans post-punk, dub and ambient pop genres. dal Forno's fourth solo studio album Confession was released on April 24, 2026.

== Personal life ==
Carla dal Forno and her domestic partner Sanjay Fernandes are the parents of a child. During late 2020 they attempted to return to Melbourne from London amidst the COVID-19 pandemic in Australia. By late 2022 dal Forno was living in Castlemaine, Victoria.

== Discography ==
=== Albums ===
Solo

- You Know What It's Like (October 2016) – Blackest Ever Black (BLACKESTCD 015)
- Look Up Sharp (2019) – Kallista Records (KALLISTACD001)
- Come Around (2022) – Kallista Records
- Confession (2026) – Kallista Records

F ingers

- Broken Fingers (as by Fingers Pty Ltd) (2013) – Night People (NP194)
- Hide Before Dinner (2015)) – Blackest Ever Black (BLACKEST 044)
- Awkwardly Blissing Out (2017) – Blackest Ever Black (BLACKEST 065)

=== Extended plays (EPs) ===
Solo

- The Garden (2017) – Blackest Ever Black (BLACKEST 068EP)

Mole House

- Mole House (2012) – Night People (NP157)

Tarcar

- Mince Glace (2014) – Blackest Ever Black (BLACKEST037)

=== Singles ===
Solo

- "Fast Moving Cars" (2016)
- "So Much Better" (2019)
- "Come Around" (2022)
- "Side by Side" (2022)

Mole House

- "Hey Come My Way" (2012) – Quemada Records (QUE-003)
