= Graham Bell (singer) =

- Born: Graham Thomas Bell; 17 April 1948; Blyth, Northumberland
- Died: 2 May 2008 (aged 60) London, England
- Genres: Blues, rock
- Instrument: Vocals
- Years active: 1966–2008

Graham Thomas Bell (17 April 1948, Blyth, Northumberland – 2 May 2008, London) was an English pop and rock singer. He was the lead vocalist for the band Every Which Way, which recorded one album in 1970.

== Early career ==
Bell made a solo single in 1966 and one year later replaced Alan Hull as the singer of psychedelic rock band Skip Bifferty (later renamed Heavy Jelly). In 1969 he was singer in another psychedelic rock band, Griffin. In 1970 he began his stint with Charisma Records, joining Every Which Way, a band formed by Brian Davison formerly of The Nice, as singer and principal writer. Musical style was jazzy progressive rock with guitar from John Hedley (who was later part of Last Exit, with Sting) playing call and response with Bell's blues shout vocals. Bell then rejoined his old mates from Skip Bifferty, now known as Arc, to form Bell & Arc in July 1971, with John Turnbull, Mick Gallagher, Bud Beadle, Kenny Craddock, Steve Gregory, Tom Duffy and Alan White. Bell was then tempted to leave the group to record his self-titled solo album in 1972, featuring Tim Hinkley, Tim Drummond, Mel Collins and Ian Wallace, and produced by Bob Johnston. In 1976, Alan White published his only solo album called Ramshackled on which he invited some old friends to play along with him, Bud Beadle and Steve Gregory on sax and flute, Kenny Craddock on keyboards, among other musicians who came and helped him.

== 1970s and America ==
After Bell's appearance in the London Symphony Orchestra version of Tommy it was reported that Pete Townshend produced an album for him, but it never saw the light of day. In 1974 he contributed backing vocals on Carol Grimes' Warm Blood also featuring Tommy Eyre, Jess Roden, John 'Rabbit' Bundrick and Henry Lowther. In the late 1970s Bell featured on the front page of Sounds music paper as a "the man most likely to", but sadly his profile was affected by the rise of punk and the new wave. Bell moved to America, where he toured with Long John Baldry, and was the co-front man along with Jackie Lomax of a band of LA Brit expatriates known as the Tea Bags, among others, before returning to his native Northeast England in the mid-1980s. He also lived for a while in Cumbria before finally heading for London again and cropping up in Snowy White's Blues Agency in 1988/89. In 2008 he died of cancer shortly after his 60th birthday.

== Discography ==
=== Albums ===
- Skip Bifferty (RCA Victor 1968, with Skip Bifferty)
- Take Me Down To The Water (1969, promo only with Heavy Jelly; released: Psycho 1984)
- Brian Davison's Every Which Way (Charisma 1970, with Brian Davison's Every Which Way)
- Bell + Arc (Charisma 1971, with Arc)
- Graham Bell (Charisma 1972)
- Change My Life (Bellaphon 1988, with Snowy White's Blues Agency)
- Open For Business (Bellaphon 1989, with Snowy White's Blues Agency)
- The Story of Skip Bifferty (2003, with Skip Bifferty), archival compilation

=== Singles ===
- (How Do You Say) I Don't Love You Anymore / If You're Gonna Go (Polydor 1966)
- On Love / Cover Girl (RCA Victor 1967, with Skip Bifferty)
- Man In Black / Mr Money Man (RCA Victor 1968, with Skip Bifferty)
- I Keep Singing That Same Old Song / Blue (Island 1968, with Heavy Jelly)
- Too Many People / Before You Can Be A Man (Charisma 1972)

=== Session work ===
- London Symphony Orchestra: Tommy (Ode 1972)
- Carol Grimes: Warm Blood (Caroline 1974)
