= Colin Gibson (musician) =

English musician

- Born: Patrick Colin Gibson; 21 September 1949 (age 76); Newcastle upon Tyne, Tyne and Wear, England
- Genres: Rock
- Occupations: Musician; composer
- Instrument: Bass guitar
- Years active: 1960s–present
- Formerly of: Skip Bifferty; Mark-Almond; Snafu; The Movies

Patrick Colin Gibson (born 21 September 1949, Newcastle upon Tyne, Tyne and Wear, England) is an English bass player and composer.

== Career ==
Gibson and guitarist John Turnbull were childhood friends and played together in a band called the Primitive Sect, with Bob Sergeant on organ. In summer 1966, Gibson and Turnbull joined unsigned Newcastle band the Chosen Few, who had released two singles the previous year written by their then vocalist and guitarist Alan Hull, later of Lindisfarne. With Graham Bell joining on vocals, the band changed its name to Skip Bifferty and secured gigs in London. The band then secured a deal with RCA Records in summer 1967 under manager Don Arden and went on to release three singles: "On Love" which made a minor chart appearance, "Happy Land" and "Man in Black" produced by Steve Marriott and Ronnie Lane. Despite being championed by John Peel, with a handful of "Top Gear" appearances, RCA seemed oblivious to their popularity. An album, Skip Bifferty, was recorded at Decca Studios West Hampstead, but withheld by RCA for almost a year before its release in 1968 and later as a double set The Story of Skip Bifferty (Castle Music, 2003), by Sanctuary Records, along with Top Gear sessions and unreleased material.

The band began work on a follow-up album, to be called Skipzophrenia, with Gibson doing artwork for the album, but their contract was not extended. Unhappy with manager Arden, the band announced they were disbanding in November 1968, while they were actually still working together in the Isle of Wight and trying to find a new record deal. This they did with Chris Blackwell of Island Records and they released a 45 under the name Heavy Jelly, keeping their identities secret. Issued in a picture sleeve, "I Keep Singing That Same Old Song" / "Blue", written by Gibson, was released in June 1969. Arden worked out who Heavy Jelly were and Blackwell backed out. The band broke up for real.

Gibson joined the short-lived Griffin in 1969 with Kenny Craddock, Pete Kirtley and Alan White, later joined by Bell; they released a 45 "I Am the Noise in Your Head". Gibson joined Ginger Baker's Air Force, replacing Ric Grech. He and Craddock appeared on the album Ginger Baker's Air Force 2 (1970), and contributed songs to Alan Price, and Rosetta Hightower (album Hightower). Later, Gibson was re-united with fellow Griffin members Kirtley, Craddock and White and Bud Beadle, Steve Gregory & Geoff Condon, the horn section of the now-defunct Airforce in Simpson's Pure Oxygen.

The early 1970s also saw a lot of session work, including Stefan Grossman (Hot Dogs (1972, Transatlantic Records)), Alan Hull (Pipedream (1973), Squire (1975) and Phantoms (1979)), Alvin Lee (Pump Iron! (1975)), Steve Howe (Beginnings (1975)), Graham Bonnet (Graham Bonnet (1977)), Mickey Jupp (Legend (1978, Stiff Records)), Cuckoo (Iona (1978)).

Gibson, Kirtley, Craddock, and White also worked together on White's solo album, Ramshackled (1976). Gibson contributed bass and percussion, and co-wrote five of the nine tracks. Gibson, Kirtley, and White all appeared on Johnny Harris's album All to Bring You Morning (1973) and Shirley Bassey's album Something (1972).

Gibson went on to work with the band Mark-Almond for a three-month US tour supporting Joe Cocker and played on their album Rising on Harvest (with Mingus drummer Danny Richmond).

In July 1973, he joined Pete Solley (organ), ex-Procol Harum drummer Bobby Harrison (vocals, percussion), and ex-Tramline members Micky Moody (guitar) and Terry Popple (drums) in Snafu. They recorded three albums in 1973–75, Snafu, Situation Normal and All Funked Up.

Gibson went on to join Radiator with Craddock, Kirtley, Alan Hull, Terry Popple (album "Isn't It Strange"-Rocket Records).

Gibson co-wrote three songs with Craddock that appear on Lindisfarne's 1973 album Roll On, Ruby, but does not appear himself.

Gibson went on to work with Kevin Coyne, Carol Grimes, the Movies, Lee 'Scratch' Perry, Bert Jansch ("When the Circus Comes to Town").

=== Little Armadillos ===
In 1984, Gibson co-wrote the Channel 4 sitcom Little Armadillos with Pete Richens of the Comic Strip. Little Armadillos was an alternative comedy sketch show in sitcom format that aired in the United Kingdom in 1984. Set in a nightclub run by the psychotic brothers Wayne and Donny Armadillo, the show ran for seven 30-minute episodes from 13 September to 25 October 1984 and has never been repeated or released on video or DVD. It starred Steve Steen and Jim Sweeney as Wayne and Donny respectively and co-starred Daniel Peacock, Helen Lederer, Phil Nice, Steve Frost and Mark Arden, among other members of the alternative comedy scene of the early 1980s. The show also featured The Flatlettes, who sang short songs within the show which were written by Gibson and Craddock. The show was directed by Bob Spiers. The British Sitcom Guide described the show, "Those that can remember this dark 'alternative comedy' have fond memories of it."

=== Soundtrack work ===
In 1984, Craddock and Gibson founded Invisible Studios specialising in film and television soundtracks, often for director Bob Spiers.

In the 1990s, they provided the incidental music to "It's a Small World" with Alexei Sayle and the series Upline by Howard Schuman, and Small World by David Lodge (screenplay by Schuman), The Love Child (with Sheila Hancock, Peter Capaldi, Alexei Sayle), Wild Flowers, Funny Business (1992 physical comedy with Rowan Atkinson), "Didn't You Kill My Brother?" (an episode of Comic Strip Presents 1988), and Steven Moffat's sitcom Joking Apart. They also worked on the comedy film Kevin of the North (2001; also known as Chilly Dogs), featuring Leslie Nielsen.

=== Later album work ===
In 1988, Gibson joined alto saxophonist Trevor Watts' band Moiré Music, appearing on With One Voice, and later toured the United States, Canada, Mexico, Venezuela and Africa as well as one-off international festivals with the 1989 offshoot Moiré Music Drum Orchestra.

In 1990, Gibson formed Buick6 with Roger Hubbard and Liam Genockey. They released four CDs: Cypress Grove (1990), Juice Machine (1995), Foolin' with this Heart (1997) and Live at the Telegraph (2010).

In 1997, Gibson produced Kirtley's solo album Bush Telegraph with Liane Carroll, Geoff Leppard, and Steve Lamb.

Further work includes Pass the Cat (Peach, 1999 and 442, 2004), Nightshift (Under the Basement, 2008), John Pearson (Eucalypto Furioso, 2007) and designs with Guano Grafix, producing many CD covers. Gibson also ran the magazine website The Lyer. Under the pseudonym "Bird Guano" he currently writes the satirical column "sausage life" for the Hastings Independent Press, a print-based local newspaper in Hastings, for which he is also an editor.

Gibson has released two CDs with songwriting partner Jack Pound under the name Guano Poundhammer: Domestic Bliss (1999), and People Who Are Dead And Don't Know That They Are, 2010. He is also working on solo projects under the name Bird Guano.

Gibson also works with The Hunt Cult, a loose collective of filmmakers and artists, and collaborates with artist Alan Rankle on installation projects that have featured in several galleries and museums in the UK and abroad. He also runs The Hastings 5-day Film Challenge with fellow filmmaker Emmett Ives.
