= Skip Bifferty =

English psychedelic rock band

- Also known as: Heavy Jelly
- Origin: Newcastle, England
- Genres: Psychedelic rock; psychedelic pop
- Years active: 1966–1969
- Labels: RCA Victor
- Past members: Graham Bell; Mick Gallagher; Colin Gibson; John Turnbull; Tommy Jackman; Paul Nichols

Skip Bifferty were an English psychedelic rock band formed in early 1966. The band featured future members of Ian Dury and The Blockheads.

== History ==
Skip Bifferty were formed when Newcastle upon Tyne band The Chosen Few (featuring Alan Hull, later of Lindisfarne) changed their name and recruited a new singer, Graham Bell, to replace Hull. Managed by Don Arden, father of Sharon Osbourne, the band were given a contract by RCA Records.

For RCA, the group released a number of psychedelic singles, including "Man in Black" (produced by Steve Marriott and Ronnie Lane, both then in the Small Faces), and the 1967 album Skip Bifferty, most recently released with bonus tracks as The Story of Skip Bifferty on Sanctuary Records. Some of their songs were covered by established artists Cilla Black, The Tremeloes and The Kingsmen, and they built a following on the live circuit, including touring with The Who in October 1968. They also appeared in the 1960s cult film Smashing Time, featuring Rita Tushingham.

However, a management dispute with Arden eventually led to the band's demise under that name in November 1968. Early in 1969, under the pseudonym 'Heavy Jelly' and with Paul Nichols replacing Jackman on drums, the band released one single on Island Records, "I Keep Singing That Same Old Song", which received exposure on the Island Records sampler LP Nice Enough to Eat. The name was taken from a joke review in the London magazine Time Out, and confusingly was soon after also used by another group, which featured Jackie Lomax as lead singer, prior to the commencement of his solo career. Uncovered as Skip Bifferty and without a recording contract, the band, now with Fred Wheatley on drums, split soon after.

Together with Turnbull and Gallagher, Bell formed Bell & Arc in July 1971. Bassist Colin Gibson went on to work with Ginger Baker, Bert Jansch, Alvin Lee and Van Morrison, amongst others. John Turnbull and Mick Gallagher reappeared as Loving Awareness, in 1974, and, in 1977, in The Blockheads, backing Ian Dury; in 1979 Gallagher played and recorded with The Clash and The Only Ones.

== Personnel ==
- Graham Bell: vocals
- Mick Gallagher: keyboards
- Colin Gibson: bass
- John Turnbull: guitar, vocals
- Tommy Jackman: drums
- Paul Nichols: drums on Heavy Jelly

== Discography ==
- "On Love" / "Cover Girl" (RCA Victor RCA 1621, 1967)
- "Happy Land" / "Reason to Live" (RCA Victor RCA 1648, 1967)
- "Man in Black" / "Mr. Money Man" (RCA Victor RCA 1720, July 1968)
- L.P.: Skip Bifferty (RCA Victor SF 7941 [stereo] / RD 7941 [mono], September 1968)
- "I Keep Singing That Same Old Song" / "Blue" [as Heavy Jelly] (Island WIP-6049, January 1969)
- "Skip Bifferty--The Story of Skip Bifferty " (Sanctuary/Castle CMEDD 518, 2003) 2CD
