= Skip Bifferty (album) =

Studio album by Skip Bifferty
- Released: September 1968
- Recorded: August–September 1967
- Studio: Decca Studios, West Hampstead
- Genre: Psychedelic rock
- Length: 37:15
- Label: RCA
- Producer: Vic Smith

Professional ratings
Review scores
Source	Rating
Allmusic	4.5/5 stars

Skip Bifferty is the only album by Skip Bifferty.

== Track listing ==
Side 1

1. "Money Man" (Bell, Turnbull, Gallagher, Gibson, Jackman)
2. "Jeremy Carabine" (Bell, Turnbull, Gibson)
3. "When She Comes to Stay" (Turnbull, Bell)
4. "Guru" (Turnbull, Gibson)
5. "Come Around" (Bell, Gallagher, Turnbull)
6. "Time Track" (Bell, Turnbull, Gibson)
7. "Gas Board Under Dog (Part 1)" (Turnbull, Gallagher)

Side 2

1. "Inside the Secret" (Bell)
2. "Orange Lace" (Bell, Turnbull)
3. "Planting Bad Seeds" (Smith, Gallagher, Turnbull, Bell)
4. "Yours for at Least 24" (Bell, Turnbull, Gallagher, Gibson)
5. "Follow the Path of the Stars" (Smith, Bell, Gallagher)
6. "Prince of Germany the First" (Gibson, Turnbull)
7. "Clearway 51" (Bell, Gibson, Gallagher)

== Personnel ==
Skip Bifferty

- Graham Bell - vocals
- John Turnbull - guitar, vocals
- Colin Gibson - bass
- Mick Gallagher - keyboards
- Tommy Jackman - drums

Technical

- Producer: Vic Smith (later also producer of The Jam)
- Cover Paintings: R. Wagner
