= Little Armadillos =

UK sitcom television series

- Written by: Pete Richens; Colin Gibson
- Country of origin: United Kingdom
- Original language: English
- No. of series: 1
- No. of episodes: 7

Production
- Running time: 30 minutes

Original release
- Network: Channel 4
- Release: 13 September – 25 October 1984

Little Armadillos is an alternative comedy sketch show in sitcom format that aired on Channel 4 in the United Kingdom in 1984. Set in a nightclub (The Seal Club) run by the psychotic brothers Wayne and Donny Armadillo, the show ran for seven 30-minute episodes from 13 September to 25 October 1984 and has never been repeated or released on video or DVD. Written by Pete Richens and Colin Gibson, it starred Steve Steen and Jim Sweeney as Wayne and Donny respectively, and co-starred Daniel Peacock, Helen Lederer, Phil Nice, Steve Frost and Mark Arden, among other members of the alternative comedy scene of the early Eighties. The show also featured The Flatlettes, who sang short songs within the show which were written by Colin Gibson and Kenny Craddock, while the show was directed by Bob Spiers.
