= Mississippi River Festival =

Festival in Illinois

Mississippi River Festival (MRF)
- Interactive map of Mississippi River Festival (MRF)
- Address: 1 Riverfront Dr; Alton, IL; United States
- Coordinates: +38.887°N 90.1816°W
- Owner: Southern Illinois University Edwardsville (formerly), Nick Bifano
- Capacity: 4,000 seating capacity
- Designation: Outdoor Theatre

Construction
- Opened: 1969
- Closed: 1980
- Reopened: 2024
- Years active: 14

Website
- www.mississippiriverfest.com

The Mississippi River Festival (MRF) is a summer outdoor concert series held during the years 1969-1980, and rebooted in 2024. Originally on the campus of Southern Illinois University in Edwardsville, Illinois. The Festival is notable due to its central midwestern location, the natural ambience of its outdoor venue, and the consistently high quality of performers.

In 2024, Mississippi River Festival was announced to be happening at Liberty Bank Amphitheater in Alton, Illinois

On May 22, 1981, officials at SIU announced there would be no Mississippi River Festival in the upcoming summer.

MRF consisted of a variety of popular rock, folk, bluegrass, and classical music performers. Shows for the more popular groups, such as The Who, The Osmonds, Chicago, Eagles, and Grateful Dead, were heavily attended. Some shows attracted crowds in excess of 30,000. Jackson Browne appeared as both a backup band (for Yes in 1972 and America in 1973) and ultimately, as a lead act in 1977. He also wrote two of his songs for the live Running on Empty album in a nearby Holiday Inn at the intersection of I-270 and Illinois Route 157. It is estimated that over one million visitors attended MRF over 12 summers.

In July 1969, Bob Dylan did a short surprise gig with The Band.

== Logistics ==
The outdoor venue was located on a hill forming a natural amphitheater characterized by a large circus-like tent, an acoustic shell at the bottom of the hill, and a single entrance area at the top of the hill. Students were able to attend shows at a discount. The MRF site was designed by George Anselevicius and George Dickie. The tent area contained approximately 1,900 director-style chairs arranged on a white gravel rock surface. Although there were a minimal number of permanent structures at the venue, the entrance, concession stands, and restroom areas were decorated with large canvas sails designed by Gyo Obata. The mini-roadtrip to the site and meeting friends in the parking areas around the venue were akin to a 1970s youth version of tailgating.

The majority of audience sat on the lawn on blankets. Two pathways flanked the lawn area running from the entrance area to the stage area. There were restrooms on either side of the venue.

In 1978, the Nederlander Organization was contracted to manage the facility and book acts. In 1980, SIUE officials requested that the Nederlander Organization book more eclectic entertainment, including classical symphonies and operas instead of just popular music bands. Nederlander refused, and after a breakdown in negotiations, the University decided to close the venue. Since the Nederlander Organization held a ten-year lease, the facility could not be used.

== Sound production ==
Bob Heil, President and founder of Heil Sound and production adviser to national touring groups (such as the Grateful Dead and The Who), provided sound production for seven years. Ed Drone of Heil Sound mixed the house sound six nights a week for seven years.

== See also ==
- List of historic rock festivals
- Walter Susskind
