= The Islington =

Coordinates: 51°32′04″N 0°06′32″W

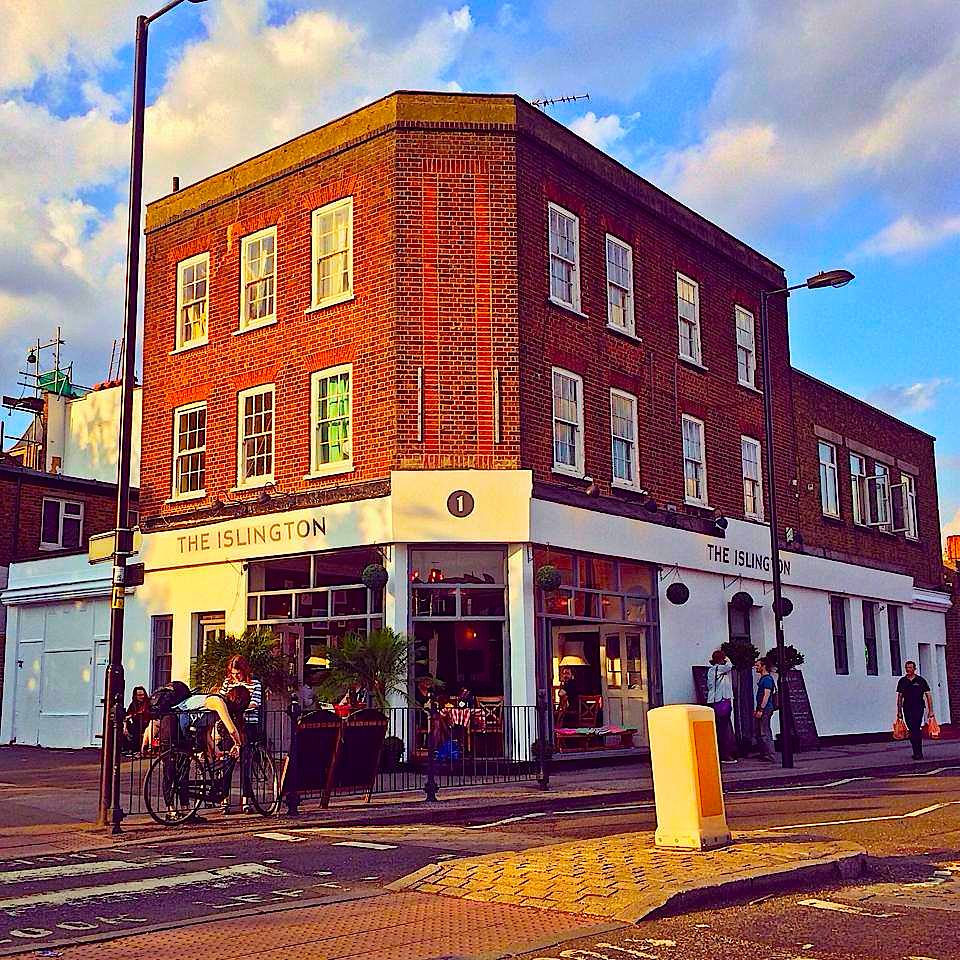
The Islington

The Islington was a live music venue and restaurant located at 1 Tolpuddle Street, London, England. Prior to this, it was called the "North One". It opened in 2012 and hosted diners and gig-goers alike until its doors closed for good in 2019.

During this time, it became a known venue for national and international touring acts. The venue booking schedule hosted notable performances from Thurston Moore, Jeffrey Lewis, Matthew Caws(Nada Surf), Ethan Johns Jamie Lawson, Sarah Neufeld (Arcade Fire), Ward Thomas, The Magic Numbers, Minor Alps, Lisa Mitchell, Whyte Horses, Max Cooke, The High Llamas, Cara Dillon, The Barr Brothers, Jamie Lenman, Ben Taylor and Yasmine Hamdan.

The venue also hosted high-profile book launches from David Hepworth, Paul Morley Hunter Davies, and Jon Savage.
