= Come Around (Carla dal Forno album) =

2022 studio album

Studio album by Carla dal Forno
- Released: 4 November 2022
- Studios: Castlemaine, Victoria, Australia
- Genres: Synth-pop; post-punk
- Length: 32:53
- Label: Kallista
- Producer: Carla dal Forno

Carla dal Forno chronology
Look Up Sharp (2019)	Come Around (2022)	Confession (2026)

Singles from Come Around
- 1. "Come Around" Released: 17 August 2022; 2. "Side by Side" Released: 5 October 2022

Come Around is the third studio album by Australian singer Carla dal Forno, released 4 November 2022 by the artist's label Kallista Records. The album was announced 17 August alongside the release of the lead single and title track, which also came with a music video edited by Ludovic Sauvage which depicts dal Forno walking through a blurry, red landscape. The album explores themes of home, disorder and insomnia, and is the artist's first since her move to Castlemaine, Victoria, Australia where she recorded the album.

== Style and reception ==
Come Around ratings
Aggregate scores
Source	Rating
Metacritic	76/100
Review scores
Source	Rating
AllMusic	3.5/5 stars
Beats Per Minute	76%
Mojo	4/5 stars
Narc	3.5/5 stars
NME	4/5 stars
Our Culture Mag	3.5/5 stars
Pitchfork	7/10
The Skinny	4/5 stars
Uncut	6/10

According to the review aggregator Metacritic, Come Around received "generally favorable reviews" based on a weighted average score of 76 out of 100 from 8 critic scores. The Skinny's Joe Creely notes that Come Around sees dal Forno "hone in even further" on her two previous solo albums' "80s DIY synth-pop and post-punk" sound, with a "trademark dreamy haze" which "is certainly there in spades." The album "feels slighter" than its predecessor Look Up Sharp and "doesn't have the tonal or the sonic variety of that previous record" aside from the more uptempo "Mind You're On", instead seeing dal Forno's sound-world polished to perfection.

Narc's Robin Webb says dal Forno's "familiar austere sound reverberates in acres of space often anchored by a rhythmically intimate synth or guitar reminiscent of the Young Marble Giants or Julee Cruise". The title track "plays to an empty auditorium audience of one, inviting you to come closer but only if you dare to", and while the album feels cold, "if you accept her invitation, immerse yourself in the swathes of gossamer washes, you'll find yourself 'no longer tethered to the world outside.'" Flood Magazine's Kyle Lemmon calls Come Around "a waxing and waning album that fits [dal Forno's] moonlit style" and "her best effort yet."

=== Year-end lists ===
Come Around year-end lists
Publication	#	Ref.
Gorilla vs. Bear	21	

== Track listing ==
All tracks are written by Carla dal Forno, except track 3 by Dorothy Moskowitz and Joseph Byrd. All tracks are produced by dal Forno.

Come Around track listing
No.	Title	Length
1.	"Side by Side"	3:20
2.	"Come Around"	3:02
3.	"The Garden of Earthly Delights"	4:24
4.	"Stay Awake"	4:06
5.	"Autumn"	2:50
6.	"Mind You're On"	3:40
7.	"Slumber" (featuring Thomas Bush)	3:59
8.	"Deep Sleep"	3:15
9.	"Caution"	4:17
Total length:		32:53
