= Kirklevington Country Club =

Kirklevington Country Club, commonly known as The Kirk, was a club in the village of Kirklevington, Yarm, North Yorkshire, which saw many of the bands of the 1960s, 1970s and 1980s appearing on its small stage.

== Bands ==
Notable bands that appeared here included Eric Clapton (Cream), The Jimi Hendrix Experience, Joe Cocker, Rod Stewart, Moody Blues, Spencer Davis Group, Traffic, John Mayall's Bluesbreakers, Brian Auger & the Trinity, Zoot Money & his Big Roll Band, The Animals, Sugar Pie DeSanto, Graham Bond Organisation (featuring Ginger Baker & Jack Bruce), Alex Harvey, Alexis Korner, Thin Lizzy, George Melly, PP Arnold and The Nice (Emerson on Hammond), Terry Reid, Simple Minds, Yes, Mott the Hoople, Buddy Guy, Paul Young, The Alan Bown Set, Goldie & The Gingerbreads, Jimmy James and the Vagabonds, Geno Washington and the Ram Jam Band, Spooky Tooth, the Jeff Beck Group (feat. Rod "The Mod" Stewart and Ronnie Wood), Chris Rea, Paul Rodgers, David Coverdale, Dire Straits, Marc Almond / Soft Cell and the Patter Merchants, etc.

== History ==
=== Early history ===
The club premises were (pre World War II) a filling station/garage, situated on the old A19 York road leading north to Newcastle and Sunderland, (the club's owners maintained a tradition of forecourt petrol-sales until the 1980s). During the 1950s a local dance band leader Tommy Reay converted the large 1st floor room, and built extensions to form an out-of-town (Stockton/Middlesbrough) dance hall, which often also catered as a pre-motorway service station for early car owners and was also, (long before the Govt breathalyser-test was made mandatory in 1967), a regular 'drinks' stop-off venue for race-goers driving home northwards up the A19 to Middlesbrough, Sunderland and Newcastle, from the seasonal 'meetings' held at York, Wetherby and Doncaster.

=== 1960s ===
In 1965 the club was purchased by a young local musician and promoter John Benedict McCoy (whose 8-piece R&B band The Crawdaddies had been playing there since 1964) and his partner Ken Crawford. John McCoy had already proved himself well enough in promoting many accomplished young bands on 'the rise up' as early as 1963. Even booking the Rolling Stones for £65 ($90) and The Hollies at his previous club-venue The Outlook in Middlesbrough. On Saturday 13 July 1963 both The Hollies and The Rolling Stones appeared on the same bill at The Outlook, In fact this was the Rolling Stones first booking outside of Greater London, and this one-off gig was actually 'brokered' as a favour through John McCoys friend, blues-singer Long John Baldry. In Bill Wyman's book "Rolling with the Stones" (a detailed journal of his time with the band) he is adamant that this booking was at a Middlesbrough club called the Alcove. However, there never was a Middlesbrough club of that name. John McCoy's explanation for this is that he wrote Alcove on the Rolling Stones contract (signed by McCoy and Brian Jones) to give the basement-club a separate identity from the 'Young Outlook' fashion store above it! An advertisement for this double booking at The Outlook appeared in the Evening Gazette the previous night. At another small 200 capacity venue, John McCoy opened in late 1966, Mr McCoys in Bottomley St, Middlesbrough, he had also booked 'Little' Stevie Wonder and The Who.

During the mid/late 1960s and long before widespread car ownership amongst the young, Kirklevington Country Club proved surprisingly popular, even though its North Yorkshire village location was quite remote from local towns. Weekend nights at the "Kirk" were particularly well attended, as these were the nights the live-bands appeared. Many clubgoers would board the latest early-evening bus service there, and then rely on hitch-hiking home in groups along the roadside in the early hours. The club also operated a small 'casino' at this time featuring Blackjack & Roulette tables. However, the punitive taxation created by UK Gambling Acts of 1966 and 1968 soon made this facility unviable, accompanied with an immediate loss of revenue.

Another difficulty to the club's operation was dealt by the creation of the County Borough of Teesside in 1968, the new boundaries of which extended into parts of the old North Riding of Yorkshire, including Kirklevington village. The immediate impact to patrons was that the very popular Sunday night, which had previously been licensed for alcohol sales until 12:00 midnight by the N. Riding licensing authority, was now reduced to 10:30pm by the new Teesside Licensing Dept. After this time, only 'soft-drinks' could be purchased until the club closed at midnight.

=== 1970s ===
By the early 1970s John McCoy gave over part of the building (a former vehicle workshop) to his brothers Peter, Tom & Eugene McCoy, in order for them to open a small, almost 'bijou' 30-seater restaurant. After quickly establishing a very widespread reputation for fine food and winning the Egon Ronay Guide Award for being "Restaurant of the Year' in 1975, they then went onto open McCoys at The Tontine, which became a UK and internationally acclaimed gourmet dining venue, some five miles south, along the main A19 road, near Osmotherley, North Yorkshire in a former 17th century coaching-inn. The McCoy brothers eventually ceased their involvement with The Tontine as of May 2013.

After his brothers vacated their restaurant from the club, John McCoy established a small 'bistro' dining area on the 1st floor which was primarily served by an open to view charcoal-grill facility, specialising in locally sourced steaks and salads, served with large bowls of US-style French fries. Another unique aspect McCoy introduced to the club in the 1970s, was 'imported' (and then hard to find in the UK) Australian Foster's lager, which was served from ice-filled troughs, 'in the can' for patrons to activate the ring-pull themselves. This procedure was so unusual at that time, that an illustration of a 'foaming' can of lager bearing the club's logo quickly became part of its publicity material.

During the late 1970s, John B. McCoy became personal manager of two Middlesbrough-born singer/songwriters Claire Hamill and later Chris Rea.

=== 1980s to present day ===
By the early 1980s, after extensive touring and the release of two albums with Rea, McCoy handed over his management role to Jim Beach (manager of Queen) and returned to Kirklevington to further develop his club premises. This was to include a unique New England influenced, 60-cover restaurant Martha's Vineyard Bar & Grill (1983) spread over two levels. It proved so popular that it very soon required at least 14-day advance table reservations. However, a huge new venture in Darlington, Perry's, around 1991 proved unsuccessful and eventually led to that venue and The Kirklevington Country Club, being sold in the mid-1990s.

The new purchasers massively expanded the club on the site, which meant that it lost much of its previous 'intimate' atmosphere, along with many longtime, dedicated 'core' patrons, (being before this redevelopment, a total 375 capacity). They also ceased the 'live' bands aspect of the McCoy years. The new Club premises, by now at 800 capacity, eventually failed after only three years, and the building was sold and demolished, for the erection of a group of 'faux' cottage style homes.
