= Ramshackled =

Studio album by Alan White
- Released: March 1976
- Recorded: 23–25 May 1975
- Studio: IBC Studios, London
- Genre: Jazz fusion, art rock, pop rock, soul
- Length: 38:56
- Label: Atlantic, Wounded Bird
- Producer: Alan White, Bob Potter

Ramshackled is the only solo album by Alan White, drummer for British progressive rock band Yes. It was released in 1976 on Atlantic Records, during a period when all five Yes band members (Jon Anderson, Chris Squire, Steve Howe, Patrick Moraz and White) released solo albums. White only performed drums on the album and neither wrote nor sang any of the songs.

== Background and recording ==
White had worked with Pete Kirtley and Kenny Craddock in the Alan Price Set and Happy Magazine. White, Kirtley, Craddock and Colin Gibson then worked together in the short-lived Griffin in 1969. In the early 1970s, White, Kirtley, Craddock, Gibson and Bud Beadle played together in an unsigned band called "Simpson's Pure Oxygen". Craddock was also in the second line up of Lindisfarne who released two albums between 1973 and 1975. For his debut solo album, White brought Kirtley, Craddock, Gibson and Beadle back together.

Fellow Yes members, Jon Anderson and Steve Howe, guested on "Spring: Song of Innocence". Gibson and wind player Bud Beadle also appeared on Steve Howe's own solo album from the same period, Beginnings. Although he does not appear on the album, Patrick Moraz has a cameo in the promotional video.

Yes subsequently toured in 1976, with initial dates of the tour including material from the members' solo albums, including "One Way Rag" and "Song of Innocence", but these were soon dropped.

== Reception ==
Professional ratings
Review scores
Source	Rating
AllMusic	2/5 stars

AllMusic's Alex Anderson found the album highly uneven and noted that the album's hodgepodge of popular styles failed to appeal to the progressive rock fanbase White had gained with Yes. He concluded "Although Ramshackled isn't terrible, most of the Yes fans who bought it agreed that their money hadn't been well spent."

== Track listing ==
1. "Ooh Baby (Goin' to Pieces)" (Pete Kirtley) 5:33
2. "One Way Rag" (Colin Gibson, Kenny Craddock) 4:07
3. "Avakak" (Craddock, Gibson, Kirtley) 6:54
4. "Spring-Song of Innocence" (lyrics: William Blake, music: Kirtley) 5:02
5. "Giddy" (Craddock, Gibson) 3:13
6. "Silly Woman" (Kirtley) 3:15
7. "Marching Into a Bottle" (Craddock) 2:00
8. "Everybody" (Craddock, Gibson, Kirtley) 3:14
9. "Darkness, Pts. 1–3" (Craddock, Gibson) 5:32

== Personnel ==
- Alan White – drums, percussion
- Bud Beadle, Steve Gregory – flute, saxophone
- Henry Lowther – trumpet
- Madeline Bell, Vicki Brown, Joanne Williams – backing vocals
- Pete Kirtley – electric and acoustic guitars, vocals
- Kenny Craddock – piano, organ, synthesizers, vocals
- Alan Marshall – vocals
- Colin Gibson – bass, percussion
- David Bedford – orchestral arrangements and conducting
- Jon Anderson – vocals on "Spring-Song of Innocence"
- Steve Howe – guitar on "Spring-Song of Innocence"

== Production ==
- Produced by Alan White & Bob Potter
- Recorded & engineered by Alan White, Bob Potter & Paul Hardiman
- Assistant & second engineer: Paul Hardiman
- Tape cutting engineer: David Tucker

== Charts ==
Chart (1976)	Peak position
UK Albums (OCC)	41
