= Playhouse =

A playhouse is a building where people view and perform plays, also known as a theatre.

Playhouse, Play House, or The Playhouse may also refer to:

== Venues and theatre companies ==
=== Australia ===
- Dunstan Playhouse, at the Adelaide Festival Centre, Adelaide, South Australia
- The Playhouse, at the Arts Centre Melbourne, Victoria
- The Playhouse, at the Canberra Theatre Centre in Canberra, ACT
- The Playhouse, at the National Institute of Dramatic Art, Sydney
- The Playhouse, at the Queensland Performing Arts Centre, Brisbane, Queensland
- The Playhouse, at the Sydney Opera House, New South Wales
- The Playhouse (1916–1933), became Garrick Theatre (Melbourne), Victoria
- Playhouse Theatre (Perth), a theatre in Perth, Western Australia, demolished in 2012
- Playhouse Theatre (Hobart), a theatre in Hobart, Tasmania

=== Austria ===
- Landestheater Niederösterreich, St. Pölten
- Schauspielhaus Salzburg
- Schauspielhaus Wien, Vienna

=== Canada ===
- The Playhouse (Fredericton), a theatre in Fredericton, New Brunswick
- The Playhouse (Hamilton), a theatre in Hamilton, Ontario
- Vancouver Playhouse (theatre venue), a theatre in Vancouver, British Columbia
- Vancouver Playhouse Theatre Company, a former theatre company at the Queen Elizabeth Theatre, Vancouver, British Columbia, known informally as "The Playhouse"

=== Denmark ===
- Royal Danish Playhouse, a theatre in Copenhagen

=== Germany ===
==== Berlin ====
- Schauspielhaus Berlin, now Konzerthaus Berlin
- Großes Schauspielhaus
- Neues Schauspielhaus

==== Elsewhere in Germany ====
- Deutsches Schauspielhaus, Hamburg
- Düsseldorfer Schauspielhaus
- Opern- und Schauspielhaus Frankfurt
- Schauspiel Bochum
- Schauspielhaus Wuppertal

=== New Zealand ===
- Playhouse Theatre, Dunedin
- Playhouse Theatre, Glen Eden, Auckland

=== South Africa ===
- The Playhouse, Durban, a theatre in Durban, Kwazulu-Natal, home of The Playhouse Company

=== Switzerland ===
- Schauspielhaus Zürich, Switzerland

=== United Kingdom ===
==== London ====
- Erith Playhouse, a theatre in Erith, southeast London
- Playhouse Theatre, a West End theatre in London

==== Elsewhere in the UK ====
- Bradford Playhouse a theatre in Bradford, West Yorkshire
- Derby Playhouse, a form theatre and theatre company in Derby (1975–2008)
- Edinburgh Playhouse, a theatre in Edinburgh, Scotland, formerly a cinema
- Epsom Playhouse, a theatre in Epsom and Ewell, Surrey
- Ilkley Playhouse, a theatre in Ilkley, Bradford
- Leeds Playhouse, a theatre in Leeds
- Liverpool Playhouse, a theatre in Liverpool, Merseyside
- Newcastle Playhouse, a theatre in Newcastle upon Tyne, Tyne and Wear
- Norwich Playhouse, a theatre in Norwich, Norfolk
- Nottingham Playhouse, a theatre in Nottingham, Nottinghamshire
- Oxford Playhouse, a theatre in Oxford, Oxfordshire
- Perth Playhouse, an independent cinema in Perth, Scotland
- Playhouse (Sleaford), Sleaford, Lincolnshire
- The Playhouse, Cheltenham, a theatre in Cheltenham, Gloucestershire
- The Playhouse, Colchester, a former theatre in Colchester, Essex
- Playhouse, Whitley Bay, Tyne and Wear
- The Playhouse, Weston-super-Mare, a theatre in Weston-super-Mare, Somerset
- Playhouse Theatre, Harlow, a theatre in Harlow, Essex
- Playhouse Theatre, Manchester, a listed building currently used as a community arts centre called Niamos Centre
- Sheffield Playhouse, a former theatre used by Sheffield Repertory Theatre in Sheffield, South Yorkshire

=== United States ===
==== California ====
- Geffen Playhouse, a theatre in Los Angeles, California
- La Jolla Playhouse a theatre in San Diego, California
- Lewis Family Playhouse, at the Victoria Gardens Cultural Center in Rancho Cucamonga, California
- Pasadena Playhouse, a theatre in Pasadena, California

==== Other states ====
- Blackfriars Playhouse, at the American Shakespeare Center, Staunton, Virginia
- Cocoa Village Playhouse, a theatre in Cocoa, Florida
- Playhouse on the Square, a theatre in Memphis, Tennessee
- Playhouse Theater, in Bennettsville Historic District, in Bennettsville, South Carolina
- Playhouse Theatre (New York City), New York
- Playhouse Theatre (Seattle), in Seattle, Washington
- Ridgefield Playhouse, a theatre in Ridgefield, Connecticut
- Westport Country Playhouse, a theatre in Westport, Connecticut

== Media and entertainment ==
=== Television ===
- Comedy Playhouse, UK sitcom anthology TV series that ran on BBC from 1961 to 1975, and 2014 to 2017
- ITV Television Playhouse, UK drama anthology TV series that ran from 1955 to 1963
- Pee-wee's Playhouse, an American children's television show that ran from 1986 to 1990
- Playhouse (British TV series), drama anthology series that ran on ITV from 1967 to 1983
- Playhouse (Philippine TV series), 2018 drama series on ABS-CBN
- Playhouse Disney, an international group of television channels and blocks for preschool-aged children

=== Film ===
- The Playhouse (film), a 1921 film written and directed by Buster Keaton
- Playhouse (film), a 2020 British horror film
- Play House (film), a 2026 American horror film

=== Radio ===
- The Playhouse (radio show), a syndicated radio show based out of Portland, Oregon

=== Music ===
- Play House (DJ), a DJ and music producer

== Toys ==
- Wendy house (or playhouse), a small house for children to play in
- Dollhouse, a toy home made in miniature

== Other uses ==
- Playhouse Records, the label founded by Jim Copp and Ed Brown
- Play House (Mumbai), a place in Mumbai, Maharashtra, India.

== See also ==
- Neighborhood Playhouse School of the Theatre, New York
- Pantages Playhouse Theatre, a former vaudeville theatre in Winnipeg, Canada
- "Play House", song by Colette Carr
- "Playhouses", a song by TV on the Radio from their 2006 album Return to Cookie Mountain
- Playing House (disambiguation)
