= Fragile Tour =

1971–72 concert tour by Yes

- World tour by Yes
- Poster to the January concerts in London, UK
- Location: Europe; North America
- Associated album: Fragile
- Start date: 24 September 1971
- End date: 27 March 1972
- Legs: 4
- No. of shows: 115 (118 scheduled)

Yes concert chronology
- The Yes Album Tour (1970–71); Fragile Tour (1971–72); Close to the Edge Tour (1972–73)

The Fragile Tour was a concert tour by progressive rock band Yes in promotion of their 1971 album, Fragile. Lasting from 24 September 1971 until 27 March 1972, and including 115 performances, the tour began at the Queen's Hall in Barnstaple, Devon, and ended at the Aquarius Theatre in Boston, Massachusetts—Bill Bruford's last performance with the band before returning for 1991's Union. The tour was Rick Wakeman's first with the band; sources differ as to whether his first live appearance with the band was on 24 September at the Queen's Hall in Barnstaple, or on 30 September—the third tour date—at Leicester's De Montfort Hall.

== Recordings ==
Three songs from the tour (from unknown dates)—"Perpetual Change", "Long Distance Runaround", and "The Fish (Schindleria Praematurus)"—were included on the band's 1973 live album, Yessongs.

The band's 3 October 1971 performance at the Hemel Hempstead Pavilion was recorded for television broadcast on BBC's Sounding Out. The recording was broadcast on 10 January 1972, shortly before the commencement of the second European leg of the tour.

== Members ==
The line-up for the tour unchanged throughout its duration, though sources are contradictory as to whether Wakeman was present for the first two concerts. The line-up was the sixth incarnation of Yes. Rick Wakeman had joined the band the previous month, spending August and early September in recording sessions for Fragile at London's Advision Studios.

- Jon Anderson—lead vocal
- Steve Howe—guitars
- Chris Squire—bass guitar and vocals
- Rick Wakeman—keyboards
- Bill Bruford—drums

== Tour ==
The tour saw the band play a total of 111 concerts in the United Kingdom, the Netherlands, the United States, and Belgium over four legs—two European legs and two North American legs.

Support came from Jonathan Swift, Ten Years After, Mary Wells, Emerson, Lake and Palmer, The J. Geils Band, King Crimson, The Blues Project, and Shawn Phillips. At a 16 March 1972 concert in Tucson, Arizona, the band supported Black Sabbath.

=== Setlist ===
Setlist:

- "Roundabout" (Anderson, Howe)
- "I've Seen All Good People" (Anderson, Squire)
- "Mood for a Day" (Howe)
- "Clap" (Howe)
- "Heart of the Sunrise" (Anderson, Squire, Bruford)
- Wakeman solo (Rick Wakeman)
- "Long Distance Runaround" (Anderson)
- "The Fish (Schindleria Praematurus)" (Squire)
- "Perpetual Change" (Anderson, Squire)
- "Yours Is No Disgrace" (Anderson, Squire, Howe, Kaye, Bruford)
- "South Side of the Sky" (only occasionally after 2 October 1971) (Anderson, Squire)

=== Tour dates ===
Date	City	Country	Venue
Europe
24 September 1971	Barnstaple	United Kingdom	Queens Hall
25 September 1971	Devizes	United Kingdom	Devizes Corn Exchange
30 September 1971	Leicester	United Kingdom	De Montfort Hall
1 October 1971	Manchester	United Kingdom	Free Trade Hall
2 October 1971	Bradford	United Kingdom	St. George's Hall
3 October 1971	Hemel Hempstead	United Kingdom	Hempstead Pavilion
4 October 1971	Aberdeen	United Kingdom	Music Hall
6 October 1971	Glasgow	United Kingdom	Green's Playhouse
8 October 1971	London	United Kingdom	Royal Festival Hall
10 October 1971	Dundee	United Kingdom	Caird Hall
11 October 1971	Wolverhampton	United Kingdom	Wolverhampton Civic Hall
12 October 1971	Bristol	United Kingdom	Colston Hall
13 October 1971	Sheffield	United Kingdom	Sheffield City Hall
15 October 1971	Stockton-on-Tees	United Kingdom	ABC Theater
16 October 1971	Newcastle	United Kingdom	Newcastle City Hall
17 October 1971	Stoke	United Kingdom	Trentham Gardens
18 October 1971	Birmingham	United Kingdom	Birmingham Town Hall
21 October 1971	Warwick	United Kingdom	University of Warwick
22 October 1971	Leeds	United Kingdom	Leeds University
23 October 1971	Edinburgh	United Kingdom	Empire Theater
25 October 1971	Chatham	United Kingdom	Central Hall
26 October 1971	Liverpool	United Kingdom	Liverpool Stadium
27 October 1971	Southampton	United Kingdom	Southampton Guildhall
28 October 1971	Southampton	United Kingdom	Southampton Guildhall
~~29 October 1971~~	Rotterdam	Netherlands	Rotterdam Ahoy
31 October 1971	Amsterdam	Netherlands	Het Concertgebouw
North America
~~2 November 1971~~	Oakland	United States	Oakland–Alameda County Coliseum
3 November 1971	Los Angeles	United States	Whisky a Go Go
4 November 1971	Los Angeles	United States	Whisky a Go Go
5 November 1971	Los Angeles	United States	Whisky a Go Go
6 November 1971	Los Angeles	United States	Whisky a Go Go
7 November 1971	Los Angeles	United States	Whisky a Go Go
8 November 1971	San Francisco	United States	Winterland
9 November 1971	San Diego	United States	San Diego Coliseum
10 November 1971	Inglewood	United States	Inglewood Forum
11 November 1971	Inglewood	United States	Inglewood Forum
12 November 1971	Oklahoma City	United States	Oklahoma City Civic Center
13 November 1971	Philadelphia	United States	The Spectrum
14 November 1971	Chicago	United States	Auditorium Theater
15 November 1971	Detroit	United States	Eastown Theater
16 November 1971	Detroit	United States	Eastown Theater
17 November 1971	Elyria	United States	Elyria Catholic High School
19 November 1971	Richmond	United States	William and Mary Hall
20 November 1971	Durham	United States	Duke Indoor Stadium
21 November 1971	DeLand	United States	Stetson University
22 November 1971	Atlanta	United States	Atlanta Municipal Auditorium
23 November 1971	Baltimore	United States	Baltimore Civic Center
24 November 1971	New York City	United States	Academy of Music
25 November 1971	New York City	United States	Academy of Music
27 November 1971	New York City	United States	Ritz Theater
28 November 1971	Stony Brook	United States	Stony Brook University
30 November 1971	New York City	United States	Genesio College
1 December 1971	Waterbury	United States	Palace Theater
2 December 1971	Cincinnati	United States	Reflections
3 December 1971	Akron	United States	Akron Civic Theater
4 December 1971	Gettysburg	United States	Gettysburg College
5 December 1971	Plattsburgh	United States	SUNY Plattsburgh
8 December 1971	Pittsburgh	United States	Pittsburgh Civic Arena
9 December 1971	Gaithersburg	United States	Montgomery Country Fairgrounds
10 December 1971	Carlisle	United States	Dickinson College
11 December 1971	Garden City	United States	Nassau Community College
12 December 1971	Newark	United States	Newark Symphony Hall
14 December 1971	Boston	United States	Orpheum Theater
15 December 1971	Cleveland	United States	Allen Theater
16 December 1971	Pittsburgh	United States	Syria Mosque
18 December 1971	New Orleans	United States	The Warehouse
Europe
14 January 1972	London	United Kingdom	Rainbow Theater
15 January 1972	London	United Kingdom	Rainbow Theater
19 January 1972	Leuven	Belgium	University of Leuven
20 January 1972	Antwerp	Belgium	Cinema Roma
21 January 1972	Brussels	Belgium	Auditorium Q
22 January 1972	Amsterdam	Netherlands	Het Concertgebouw
23 January 1972	Rotterdam	Netherlands	De Doelen
24 January 1972	Breda	Netherlands	Het Turfship
28 January 1972	Bristol	United Kingdom	Top Rank Suite
29 January 1972	Boston	United Kingdom	Starlight Room
30 January 1972	Bristol	United Kingdom	Colston Hall
31 January 1972	Manchester	United Kingdom	Free Trade Hall
North America
18 February 1972	Bethany	United States	Bethany College
19 February 1972	New York City	United States	Academy of Music
21 February 1972	Asbury Park	United States	Sunshine Inn
22 February 1972	Princeton	United States	McCarter Theater
23 February 1972	New York City	United States	Academy of Music
24 February 1972	Burlington	United States	Patrick Gymnasium
25 February 1972	Smithfield	United States	Meehan Auditorium
26 February 1972	Passaic	United States	Capitol Theater
27 February 1972	Waterbury	United States	Palace Theater
28 February 1972	Buffalo	United States	Kleinhans Music Hall
29 February 1972	New York City	United States	Ritz Theater
1 March 1972	Rochester	United States	Auditorium Theater
2 March 1972	Syracuse	United States	Onondaga War Memorial Auditorium
~~3 March 1972~~	Richmond	United States	Richmond Coliseum
4 March 1972	Salem	United States	Roanoke Valley Civic Center
5 March 1972	Virginia Beach	United States	Virginia Beach Civic Center
6 March 1972	Wilmington	United States	University of North Carolina Wilmington
7 March 1972	Kutztown	United States	Keystone Hall
8 March 1972	Shippensburg	United States	Shippensburg University
10 March 1972	San Francisco	United States	Winterland Arena
11 March 1972	San Francisco	United States	Winterland Arena
13 March 1972	Denver	United States	Denver Coliseum
14 March 1972	Spokane	United States	Spokane Coliseum
15 March 1972	Los Angeles	United States	Inglewood Forum
16 March 1972	Tucson	United States	Tucson Community Center
17 March 1972	San Bernardino	United States	Swing Auditorium
18 March 1972	San Diego	United States	San Diego Sports Arena
19 March 1972	Las Vegas	United States	Las Vegas Convention Center
21 March 1972	Chicago	United States	Arie Crown Theater
22 March 1972	Detroit	United States	Cobo Hall
23 March 1972	Cincinnati	United States	Cincinnati Music Hall
24 March 1972	South Bend	United States	Morris Civic Auditorium
25 March 1972	Columbus	United States	Capital University
26 March 1972	Mentor	United States	Lakeland Community College
27 March 1972	Boston	United States	Aquarius Theater

=== Cancelled shows ===
Wilkinson (2003) lists only three shows from the tour as being cancelled. The first, on 9 October 1971 at the Edinburgh Empire Theatre, was cancelled after the PA system failed to arrive at the venue. A newspaper story at the time reported that the equipment van, travelling to Scotland from the Royal Festival Hall from the previous evening's concert, broke down in Birmingham. Similarly, two replacement vans also broke down. The band rescheduled the date for 23 October, with original tickets still valid. The band offered free posters to fans attending the 23 October show.

The second appearance to be cancelled was on 2 November at the Oakland Coliseum in Oakland, California—the first show of the tour's North American leg. The concert was cancelled as the band's PA system was stolen.

Other sources state that it was the 8 November show at the San Francisco Winterland Ballroom that was cancelled due to the stolen PA system, implying that the band appeared that night at the Oakland Coliseum (with a rented sound system) instead. The concert in Richmond VA on 3 March 1972, was also cancelled, and supposedly the band played at the Township Auditorium in Columbia, South Carolina instead. Additionally, reports exist of a show on 29 October in Rotterdam, Netherlands, that was also cancelled.

Date	City	Country
9 October 1971	Edinburgh	United Kingdom
2 November 1971	Oakland	United States
