= The Yes Album Tour =

1970–71 concert tour by Yes

- World tour by Yes
- Location: Europe; North America
- Associated album: The Yes Album
- Start date: 17 July 1970
- End date: 31 July 1971
- Legs: 3
- No. of shows: 169 (183 scheduled)

Yes concert chronology
- The Yes Album Tour (1970–71); Fragile Tour (1971–72)

The Yes Album Tour was a concert tour by progressive rock band Yes. Though it began more than six months before its release, the tour was named after the band's third studio album. Lasting from 17 July 1970 until 31 July 1971, and including 170 performances, the tour began at the Lyceum in London—Steve Howe's first performance with the band—and ended at the Crystal Palace Bowl, also in London—Tony Kaye's last performance with the band before his 13-year absence.

== History ==
The tour saw the band play concerts in the United Kingdom, Belgium, West Germany, Switzerland, the Netherlands, Denmark, Sweden, France, Italy, Canada, and the United States over three legs—a European leg, a North American leg and a single-show return to the United Kingdom. Many of the American shows were shared with Iron Butterfly. Phil Carson, then-European General Manager of Atlantic Records, decided that as Iron Butterfly could attract enough of an audience to fill the venues on their tour, it would be good exposure for Yes as he was trying to break them into the American market at the time.

== Live releases ==
Live material from this tour has appeared on the following releases:

- Steve Howe's performance of "Clap" at the London Lyceum on 17 July 1970 was recorded and included on The Yes Album as the second track.

== Tour band ==
The line-up for the tour unchanged throughout its duration, and was the fifth incarnation of Yes. Steve Howe joined the band two months previously: all concerts during May and June were cancelled while the band found a replacement for original guitarist Peter Banks, and Tony Kaye was replaced by Rick Wakeman shortly after the tour ended in time for rehearsal sessions for Fragile.

- Jon Anderson — vocals, harmonium, Dewtron Mister Bassman Bass Pedals
- Steve Howe — Gibson ES-175, Martin 00-18 acoustic guitar, vachalia, vocals
- Chris Squire — Rickenbacker 4001S, Fender Telecaster bass, vocals
- Tony Kaye — Hammond organ
- Bill Bruford — Ludwig drums, Paiste and Zildjian cymbals

=== Typical setlist ===
On the 1970 shows, the set list consisted of:

1. "Astral Traveller" (Anderson)
2. "I've Seen All Good People" (Anderson, Squire)
3. "Clap" (Including an excerpt of "Classical Gas") (Howe)
4. "Yours Is No Disgrace" (Anderson, Squire, Steve Howe, Tony Kaye, Bill Bruford)
5. "A Bass Odyssey" (Howe, Squire)
6. "America" (Paul Simon) (originally by Simon & Garfunkel)

The 1971 shows had a typical setlist of:

1. "Yours Is No Disgrace" (Anderson, Squire, Steve Howe, Tony Kaye, Bill Bruford)
2. "I've Seen All Good People" (Anderson, Squire)
3. "Clap" (Including an excerpt of "Classical Gas") (Howe)
4. "Perpetual Change" (Anderson, Squire)
5. "Everydays" (Stephen Stills)
6. "America" (Paul Simon) (originally by Simon & Garfunkel) (Replaced by "It's Love" from 24 June 1971 on)

Other songs played:

- "Then" (Anderson) (23, 29, 30 January 1971)
- "Mood For A Day" (Howe) (5, 15, 16, 17, 18, 19, 20 July 1971)

=== Tour dates ===
On various dates of the tour, Yes were supported by Black Sabbath, Uriah Heep, Supertramp, Deep Purple, Wishbone Ash, The Strawbs, Iron Butterfly, Queen, and Jethro Tull. At other performances, such as festivals, the band shared the bill with Pink Floyd and Elton John.

Beginning with the 1971 dates (when Yes began to be supported by Iron Butterfly), ticket prices were set at 10s—approximately £10 ($16 USD) in 2012.

Date	City	Country	Venue
Europe
17 July 1970	London	United Kingdom	Lyceum Ballroom
18 July 1970	Birmingham	United Kingdom	Mothers Club
19 July 1970	Redcar	United Kingdom	Redcar Jazz Club
24 July 1970	London	United Kingdom	Brompton Hall
26 July 1970	Croydon	United Kingdom	The Greyhound
31 July 1970	Plymouth	United Kingdom	Van Dike Club
2 August 1970	Croydon	United Kingdom	The Greyhound
9 August 1970	Plumpton	United Kingdom	Plumpton Racetrack
14 August 1970	Leytonstone	United Kingdom	The Red Lion
16 August 1970	Barkisland	United Kingdom	Krumlin
18 August 1970	London	United Kingdom	Marquee Club
21 August 1970	Devon	United Kingdom	The Underground
22 August 1970	Dagenham	United Kingdom	Village Underground
29 August 1970	Lincoln	United Kingdom	Knickerbockers
31 August 1970	Redcar	United Kingdom	Redcar Jazz Club
5 September 1970	Huy	Belgium	Atelier Rock
6 September 1970	Dortmund	West Germany	Fantasio
10 September 1970	Swansea	United Kingdom	Brangwyn Hall
11 September 1970	Swansea	United Kingdom	Brangwyn Hall
12 September 1970	Colchester	United Kingdom	Corn Exchange
18 September 1970	Eltham	United Kingdom	Avery Hill College
19 September 1970	Bishop's Stortford	United Kingdom	Rhodes Center
20 September 1970	Nottingham	United Kingdom	Nottingham Boat Club
22 September 1970	Birmingham	United Kingdom	Mayfair Club
23 September 1970	Barry	United Kingdom	Barry Memorial Hall
26 September 1970	Margate	United Kingdom	Margate Hall
27 September 1970	Croydon	United Kingdom	The Greyhound
28 September 1970	Aberystwyth	United Kingdom	Aberystwyth University
1 October 1970	Scarborough	United Kingdom	Open Air Theater
2 October 1970	Leicester	United Kingdom	Loughborough University
3 October 1970	Watford	United Kingdom	Watford Technical College
8 October 1970	Manchester	United Kingdom	UMIST
9 October 1970	Stratford	United Kingdom	Cox's Yard
10 October 1970	London	United Kingdom	Queen Mary College
15 October 1970	Dundee	United Kingdom	Dundee University
16 October 1970	Newcastle	United Kingdom	Newcastle City Hall
17 October 1970	Malvern	United Kingdom	Malvern Winter Gardens
23 October 1970	Leeds	United Kingdom	Leeds University
24 October 1970	Plymouth	United Kingdom	Royal Theater
26 October 1970	Romford	United Kingdom	King's Head
30 October 1970	Guildford	United Kingdom	University of Surrey
31 October 1970	London	United Kingdom	Queen Elizabeth Hall
~~2 November 1970~~	Dunstable	United Kingdom	Dunstable Civic Hall
~~3 November 1970~~	Dunstable	United Kingdom	Dunstable Civic Hall
5 November 1970	Bern	Switzerland	National Theater
6 November 1970	Bern	Switzerland	National Theater
7 November 1970	Zurich	Switzerland	Rote Fabrik
10 November 1970	Munich	West Germany	Blow Up Club
13 November 1970	London	United Kingdom	Citypolyents
14 November 1970	Bradford	United Kingdom	University Of Bradford
20 November 1970	Lancaster	United Kingdom	Lancaster University
21 November 1970	Oxford	United Kingdom	Oxford Polytechnic
22 November 1970	Plymouth	United Kingdom	Van Dike Club
~~24 November 1970~~	Bradford	United Kingdom	University of Bradford
25 November 1970	Cambridge	United Kingdom	Cambridge Theater
27 November 1970	Southend-on-Sea	United Kingdom	Technical College
28 November 1970	Boston	United Kingdom	Boston Music Room
~~1 December 1970~~	London	United Kingdom	Marquee Club
~~2 December 1970~~	Manchester	United Kingdom	Manchester College of Art
~~4 December 1970~~	Lancaster	United Kingdom	Lancaster University
~~5 December 1970~~	Liverpool	United Kingdom	Liverpool Stadium
8 December 1970	Newcastle	United Kingdom	Newcastle City Hall
9 December 1970	Hull	United Kingdom	Hull University
10 December 1970	Middlesbrough	United Kingdom	The Pavilion
11 December 1970	Warrington	United Kingdom	Thunderdome
13 December 1970	Bromley	United Kingdom	Highams Hill Farm
14 December 1970	Dunstable	United Kingdom	Queensway Hall
18 December 1970	London	United Kingdom	Lyceum Theater
19 December 1970	Folkestone	United Kingdom	Leas Cliff Hall
20 December 1970	Cleethorpes	United Kingdom	Cleethorpes Winter Gardens
22 December 1970	Shrewsbury	United Kingdom	Shrewsbury Music Hall
~~26 December 1970~~	Brighton	United Kingdom	The Big Apple
3 January 1971	Croydon	United Kingdom	The Greyhound
8 January 1971	Eindhoven	Netherlands	Parktheater
9 January 1971	Amsterdam	Netherlands	Het Concertgebouw
10 January 1971	Rotterdam	Netherlands	De Doelen
13 January 1971	Glasgow	United Kingdom	Green's Playhouse
14 January 1971	Newcastle	United Kingdom	Newcastle City Hall
15 January 1971	Lancaster	United Kingdom	Freedom Hall
16 January 1971	Southsea	United Kingdom	Portsmouth Polytechnic
17 January 1971	Bristol	United Kingdom	Colston Hall
18 January 1971	London	United Kingdom	Royal Albert Hall
19 January 1971	Birmingham	United Kingdom	Birmingham Town Hall
21 January 1971	Southampton	United Kingdom	Southampton Guildhall
23 January 1971	Aarhus	Denmark	Vejlby-Risskov Hall
24 January 1971	Gothenburg	Sweden	Gothenburg Concert Hall
25 January 1971	Copenhagen	Denmark	Falkoner Theater
29 January 1971	Lille	France	Église Saint-André
30 January 1971	Lyon	France	Lyon Amphitheater
31 January 1971	Paris	France	Palais des Sports
2 February 1971	Brussels	Belgium	Palais des Beaux-Arts
~~5 February 1971~~	Barnstaple	United Kingdom	Queens Hall
~~6 February 1971~~	Cardiff	United Kingdom	Llandaff Technical College
~~7 February 1971~~	Redcar	United Kingdom	Redcar Jazz Club
8 February 1971	Liège	Belgium	Conservatoire de Liège
12 February 1971	New Cross	United Kingdom	Goldsmiths College
13 February 1971	London	United Kingdom	London School of Economics
19 February 1971	Leeds	United Kingdom	Leeds University
20 February 1971	Kingston upon Thames	United Kingdom	Kingston Polytechnic
27 February 1971	Dagenham	United Kingdom	Dagenham Roundhouse
4 March 1971	Liverpool	United Kingdom	Liverpool Stadium
5 March 1971	Doncaster	United Kingdom	Top Rank Suite
6 March 1971	Brighton	United Kingdom	The Big Apple
7 March 1971	Redcar	United Kingdom	Redcar Jazz Club
9 March 1971	Birmingham	United Kingdom	Birmingham Town Hall
10 March 1971	Bournemouth	United Kingdom	Bournemouth Winter Gardens
12 March 1971	Cardiff	United Kingdom	Cardiff University
14 March 1971	Blackburn	United Kingdom	King George's Hall
15 March 1971	Guildford	United Kingdom	Guildford Civic Hall
16 March 1971	Nottingham	United Kingdom	Albert Hall
17 March 1971	Guildford	United Kingdom	Guildford Civic Hall
19 March 1971	Stirling	United Kingdom	Stirling University
20 March 1971	Aviemore	United Kingdom	Aviemore Sports Center
21 March 1971	Dunfermline	United Kingdom	Dumfermline Cinema
22 March 1971	Glasgow	United Kingdom	Glasgow City Center
23 March 1971	Norwich	United Kingdom	Norwich Lads Club
25 March 1971	Harrogate	United Kingdom	Royal Hall
27 March 1971	West Berlin	West Germany	Deutschlandhalle
28 March 1971	West Berlin	West Germany	Deutschlandhalle
30 March 1971	Wolverhampton	United Kingdom	Wolverhampton Civic Hall
4 April 1971	Hemel Hempstead	United Kingdom	Hempstead Pavilion
6 April 1971	Manchester	United Kingdom	Free Trade Hall
8 April 1971	Leeds	United Kingdom	Leeds Town Hall
10 April 1971	Surbiton	United Kingdom	Shoreditch Town Hall
12 April 1971	London	United Kingdom	BBC Television Centre
15 April 1971	Frankfurt	West Germany	Volksbildungsheim
16 April 1971	Böblingen	West Germany	Sporthalle
17 April 1971	Saarbrücken	West Germany	Saarland Hall
18 April 1971	Hamburg	West Germany	Hamburg Music Hall
24 April 1971	Nelson	United Kingdom	Imperial
25 April 1971	London	United Kingdom	The Roundhouse
30 April 1971	Luton	United Kingdom	Luton Recreation Center
1 May 1971	Barking	United Kingdom	Barking Polytechnic
2 May 1971	Stoke-on-Trent	United Kingdom	Trentham Gardens
6 May 1971	Chatham	United Kingdom	Central Hall
7 May 1971	Oxford	United Kingdom	Oxford Town Hall
9 May 1971	Rome	Italy	Teatro Brancaccio
10 May 1971	Milan	Italy	Teatro Lirico
11 May 1971	Arezzo	Italy	Teatro Tenda
14 May 1971	Birmingham	United Kingdom	Birmingham University
15 May 1971	Norwich	United Kingdom	Norwich Lads Club
16 May 1971	Leicester	United Kingdom	De Montfort Hall
21 May 1971	Liverpool	United Kingdom	Liverpool University
22 May 1971	Manchester	United Kingdom	Manchester University
23 May 1971	Harrogate	United Kingdom	Royal Hall
~~29 May 1971~~	Exeter	United Kingdom	Exeter University
~~4 June 1971~~	Clacton	United Kingdom	Princess Theater
5 June 1971	West Berlin	West Germany	Sportpalast
~~18 June 1971~~	Southport	United Kingdom	Floral Hall
North America
24 June 1971	Edmonton	Canada	Edmonton Gardens
25 June 1971	Vancouver	Canada	PNE Coliseum
26 June 1971	Seattle	United States	Seattle Center Coliseum
27 June 1971	Sacramento	United States	Sacramento Memorial Auditorium
28 June 1971	Los Angeles	United States	Whisky A Go Go
29 June 1971	Los Angeles	United States	Whisky A Go Go
30 June 1971	Oklahoma City	United States	Oklahoma City Music Hall
1 July 1971	San Antonio	United States	San Antonio Municipal Auditorium
2 July 1971	Dallas	United States	Dallas Memorial Auditorium
3 July 1971	Houston	United States	Hofheinz Pavilion
4 July 1971	New Orleans	United States	The Warehouse
5 July 1971	Indianapolis	United States	National Guard Armory
6 July 1971	DeLand	United States	Stetson University
7 July 1971	Orlando	United States	Orlando Sports Center
8 July 1971	Hampton	United States	Hampton Beach Ballroom
9 July 1971	Wildwood	United States	Wildwood Convention Center
10 July 1971	Asbury Park	United States	Asbury Park Convention Hall
11 July 1971	Alexandria	United States	Alexandria Roller Rink
14 July 1971	Port Chester	United States	Capitol Theater
15 July 1971	Port Chester	United States	Capitol Theater
16 July 1971	Detroit	United States	Eastown Theater
17 July 1971	Detroit	United States	Eastown Theater
18 July 1971	Toronto	Canada	York Stadium
19 July 1971	Ottawa	Canada	Ottawa Civic Center
20 July 1971	Cleveland	United States	Allen Theater
23 July 1971	New York City	United States	Gaelic Park
24 July 1971	New Haven	United States	Yale Bowl
Final show
31 July 1971	London	United Kingdom	Crystal Palace Bowl

=== Cancelled shows ===
Date	City	Country
18 May 1970	Geleen	Netherlands (first Pinkpop Festival)
2 November 1970	Dunstable	United Kingdom
3 November 1970	Dunstable	United Kingdom
24 November 1970	Bradford	United Kingdom
1 December 1970	London	United Kingdom
2 December 1970	Manchester	United Kingdom
4 December 1970	Lancaster	United Kingdom
5 December 1970	Liverpool	United Kingdom
26 December 1970	Brighton	United Kingdom
28 January 1971	Bremen	West Germany
29 January 1971	Lille	France
30 January 1971	Lyon	France
31 January 1971	Brussels	Belgium
1 February 1971	Paris	France
2 February 1971	Paris	France
6 February 1971	Cardiff	United Kingdom
7 February 1971	Redcar	United Kingdom
8 February 1971	Liėge	Belgium
9 February 1971	Brussels	Belgium
29 May 1971	Exeter	United Kingdom
4 June 1971	Clacton	United Kingdom
5 June 1971	West Berlin	West Germany
18 June 1971	Southport	United Kingdom
26 June 1971	Sheffield	United Kingdom
31 June 1971	Boston	United States

The February 1971 shows in Paris were cancelled due to rioting. After leaving France, the band had to cancel some UK shows after their van was involved in a road collision.

== Reception ==
Writing in Melody Maker in review of the group's shows (Note: On this date, Yes played two shows at the same venue—one in the afternoon, followed later by an evening performance) on 31 October 1970 at the Queen Elizabeth Hall, Chris Welch described Howe as "stealing the show", Bruford as a "proverbial tower of strength", and Anderson as "simple but emotive".
