= The Apollo, Glasgow =

Former music venue and cinema in Glasgow, Scotland

The Apollo
- Green’s Playhouse (1927–1973)
- Interactive map of The Apollo
- Address: 126 Renfield Street (1973–1987); Glasgow; Scotland
- Coordinates: 55°51′54″N 4°15′18.9″W
- Owner: George Green Ltd
- Capacity: 3,500
- Designation: Music Venue

Construction
- Opened: 5 September 1973
- Closed: 16 June 1985
- Demolished: September 1987
- Years active: 12 Years
- Architect: John Fairweather

The Apollo was a music venue at 126 Renfield Street in Glasgow city centre, Scotland. The Apollo operated from 5 September 1973 until closure on 16 June 1985 and was Glasgow's leading music venue during this period. The Apollo was a re-brand of the previous Green's Playhouse in the same building.

== History ==
The Green family owned Green's Playhouse cinema at 126 Renfield Street. It was thought to be the largest cinema in Europe at the time but was in decline. Unicorn Leisure, owned by Frank Lynch and Max Langdown, leased a discothèque named Clouds in the top floor of the building. Unicorn included management of Billy Connolly in their portfolio. On hearing the Green family were considering converting the dis-repaired venue into a bingo hall or demolishing the venue for a completely new development, Unicorn applied to lease the building which they felt had potential as a music venue. They bought a job lot of 3,000 cinema seats and re-upholstered the 'Golden Divans' in the balcony. "Apollo" was chosen as the name of the re-branded venue so to mitigate the cost of letters for which the sign company charged £250 per letter.

The first two concerts at The Apollo were performed by Johnny Cash on 5 & 6 September 1973. The venue was quickly attractive to the public responding to booking of popular performers of the time who spoke favourably of the atmosphere generated by the exuberant crowds. The ballroom operated above the main concert auditorium, originally known as "Clouds", following various name changes that included "Satellite City" and "The Penthouse". The ballroom became a music venue for up-coming and relatively lesser-known contemporary bands, such as Simple Minds, Elvis Costello, Sham 69 and The Rich Kids. These were unable to attract a large enough paying audience to fill the concert venue.

The venue was known for the atmosphere generated by its enthusiastic crowds, a 15 ft 6 in high stage (often exaggerated and misreported) that sloped down towards the audience and "bouncy balcony" designed and built so that it would move up and down. This feature was put to the test by concert-goers, who would jump to get it to bounce. Francis Rossi refers to this on Status Quo's Live!, recorded at the venue: "Those people at the top, on the balcony, [we] can only see you when the lights go up there. Get the balcony to move about a bit and they'll [the sound/road crew] all be running about and shitting themselves. Nice bunch of fellas, but very very scared of balconies!"

Jake Burns of Stiff Little Fingers said the stage was "the only one in our career where we said if anyone got onstage from the audience, they could stay. They'd earned it." Andy Summers of The Police in his autobiography "One Train Later" wrote "Back in the dressing room, drenched in sweat and sitting among piles of little tartan-wrapped presents, we remarked about the bouncing balcony, amazed that the whole thing didn't collapse." The venue was used for numerous live album recordings (see "Notable Performances" section) and was used as either opening or closing venue by many performers visiting the UK from America. The management team for the Ramones have subsequently said the Apollo was the Ramones' favourite venue.

Despite the Apollo's success as a music venue, the building was in a poor condition and its structure was gradually deteriorating. Maintenance was undertaken only on a "make-do" basis. In mid-1977 the owner of Unicorn Leisure relocated to Florida. The lease for the venue was acquired by the Apollo Leisure Group. The new leaseholders experienced considerable problems with the buildings structural condition and later considered relinquishing the lease in 1978, with Mecca Bingo expressing interest in the acquisition of the building. A successful campaign to preserve the building's status as a music venue included a 100,000 signature petition including support from Paul McCartney and Eric Clapton. The resumption was to herald a seven-year downward spiral until the venue finally closed for business on 16 June 1985. The Style Council were the final performers on the bill. The building was demolished in September 1987 following a fire that rendered the building structurally unsafe.

Such is the high regard that Ozzy Osbourne felt for the place that when he agreed to an interview on Scottish Television he asked that the interview be held in the empty disused site of the old building.

== Notable performances ==
- 5 & 6 September 1973: Johnny Cash was the first headline act after the theatre had been rebranded and reopened as The Apollo.
- October 1973: King Crimson recorded their Apollo performance, much of which was released on 1992's The Great Deceiver.
- November 1973: the Apollo was one of three venues used for Roxy Music's 1976 live album Viva!
- 27-29 October 1976: Status Quo recorded their first live album, Live!, at the Apollo. It won the ‘Classic Album Award’ at the 2012 Classic Rock Roll of Honour awards show. "It's definitely us at our most rocking… you can hear the aggression," observed singer and guitarist Francis Rossi. "And that audience you hear, in Glasgow. You didn't argue with them."
- 30 April 1978: AC/DC recorded their first live album If You Want Blood You've Got It at the Apollo. The band played their encore dressed in the full Scottish football team strip, celebrating the Scots participation in the upcoming 1978 FIFA World Cup Finals in Argentina. "The atmosphere was incredible," recalled DJ Tom Russell. "When Glasgow takes a band to heart, gigs become magical."
- 23 December 1978: The Rezillos played their farewell gig and released it as the live album Mission Accomplished... But the Beat Goes On.
- November 1979: ABBA performed the last night of their UK tour at the Apollo. It was their last live performance in Britain.
- 17 December 1979: Paul McCartney and Wings recorded a version of "Coming Up" for the flip side of the single release of the studio version. "Coming Up (Live at Glasgow)" has since appeared on US versions of the McCartney compilations All the Best! (1987) and Wingspan: Hits and History (2001). The concert featured Campbelltown Pipe Band joining the proceedings during "Mull of Kintyre"
- 31 December 1979: Blondie played, broadcast live on BBC television's The Old Grey Whistle Test. They were joined on stage by bagpipers for "Sunday Girl".
- 10–11 June 1980: Progressive rock band Rush recorded songs for their Exit... Stage Left double album at the Apollo (side 2). The Apollo recordings were selected from over 50 reels of two-inch tape Rush accumulated on their Permanent Waves and Moving Pictures tours. The remaining three sides of Exit... Stage Left were recorded in Rush's home country of Canada in 1981.
- 12 September 1980: Ozzy Osbourne began his post-Black Sabbath touring career, formally starting the Blizzard of Ozz Tour at the Apollo. Osbourne's wife and manager, Sharon Osbourne, said of the gig in her autobiography, Extreme: "We were all really, really nervous. In the days of variety, Glaswegians were said to be the most difficult of any audience in Britain, especially on a Friday night, which this was, when they got paid and got pissed. I didn't tell Ozzy - he was nervous enough already, on and off the toilet shaking with stage fright…. Before the doors opened they were lining up round the block, and we were all in shock. The show was unbelievable. At the end, Ozzy knelt down and kissed the stage. 'Thank you, thank you, I love you, love you,' he said, his voice breaking with emotion. And we all cried, the three of us: Ozzy, Randy and me, sobbing with tears of joy, and we could still hear voices from the auditorium calling for more.... He had done it. He had fucking done it."
- 1981: a recording by The Stranglers for Radio Clyde was released as Live at the Apollo in 2003.
- 19 February 1982: Alice Cooper ended his Special Forces tour at the Apollo. The show was recorded and played on Radio Clyde. A single released to mark the tour – titled "For Britain Only" – contained three tracks from the Apollo show: "Who Do You Think You Are", "Model Citizen" and "Under My Wheels". The Radio Clyde recording later became an unofficial release in Sweden titled For Glasgow Only. The concert was released on vinyl to celebrate Record Store Day 2020.
- April 1982: The Jam played two concerts at the Apollo, the first of which later appeared in Live Jam. At the end of the year they commenced their farewell tour at the Apollo.
- 30 September 1982: Roxy Music recorded The High Road (EP) at the Apollo.
- 6 February 1983: Northern Irish punk band Stiff Little Fingers played their final gig at the Apollo before reuniting in 1987.
- 14 February 1984: a Gary Moore broadcast on Radio Clyde contributed four tracks to the live album We Want Moore!.
- 13 February 1985: Phil Collins performed during The No Jacket Required World Tour.
- 7 April 1985: Tears For Fears performed during their Leonard Apple World Tour and which an audio recording was published online.
- 16 June 1985: The Style Council performed the final concert at the Apollo before it was demolished. The last song played at the venue was their cover of Curtis Mayfield's 'Move On Up'.

== After demolition ==
The Apollo was replaced by a Cineworld building constructed in 2000 and opened a year later on exactly the same site.

A musical was produced in 2009 titled, I Was There: The Story of The Glasgow Apollo.

The retro website glasgowapollo.com was launched in 2003. As of 2017 the site has received over 12 million hits.

== See also ==
- Music of Scotland
- Glasgow music scene
- List of bands from Glasgow
