= Ritz Cinema, Burton upon Trent =

Former cinema in Burton upon Trent, England

Ritz Cinema The Complex
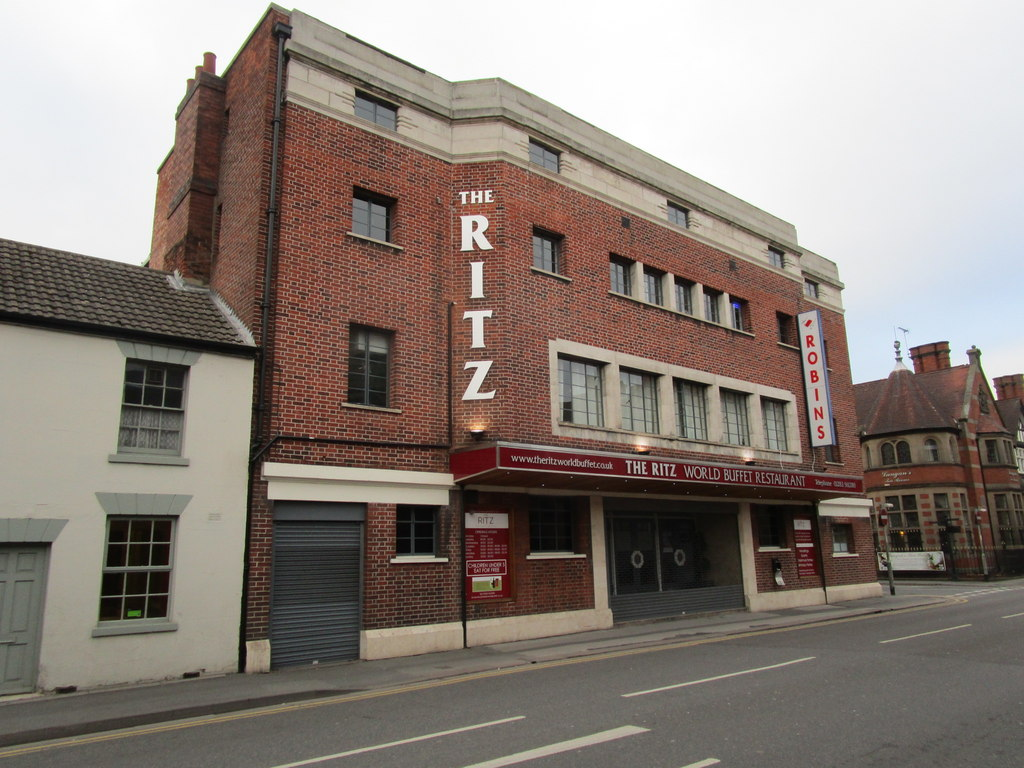
- The building in 2015

General information
- Architectural style: Modernist
- Location: Burton upon Trent, Staffordshire
- Address: Guild Street; Burton-upon-Trent DE14 1NA
- Country: England
- Coordinates: 52°48′17.248″N 1°38′3.113″W grid reference SK 24758 23089
- Opened: 1935

Design and construction
- Architect(s): John Fairweather and Thomas Jenkins

Website
- thecomplexburton.com

The Ritz Cinema is a former cinema in Burton upon Trent, Staffordshire, England, built in 1935. It closed as a cinema in 1999, and was later a restaurant. From December 2024 it is a nightclub and live venue, The Complex. It is a Grade II listed building.

== History and description ==
The Ritz Cinema, built in 1935, was commissioned by Orton & Spooner, a company based in Burton which earlier in the century had made fairground rides and shows, and later owned the Burton Picturedrome Company. They had connections with George Green, who built Green's Playhouse in Glasgow; John Fairweather, the architect of Green's Playhouse and other cinemas in Scotland, was chosen to design the Ritz Cinema, along with Thomas Jenkins, a local architect and at that time Mayor of Burton, who had designed the Electric Theatre, of 1910, in the town.

It was built on the site of the New Theatre and Opera House, of 1902, which showed films from 1930 and was demolished in 1934. This was a rebuilding of St George's Hall, a concert hall of 1868. The front of this building was in George Street: the façade remains, described in the listing text as "loosely Jacobean in design", now at the back of the present building, of which the front is on Guild Street.

The cinema is a steel-framed brick building in Modernist style; the façade on Guild Street has above the ground floor entrance a central section projecting forwards, which features five square Crittall Windows, and a row of smaller windows above. The interior was designed in Art Deco style by Annie Orton, a relation of the owner, and has plasterwork friezes by George Legg of Bryan's Adamanta.

The first film shown at the Ritz Cinema was Blossom Time. It remained a cinema until 1999; during this period there were changes of ownership and corresponding changes of name, to the Gaumont in 1957, the Odeon in 1966, and the Robins Cinema in 1996. From 1974 there were three screens.

=== Later history ===
It was given listed status in 2007. It re-opened in 2014 as The Ritz, a restaurant with a venue room upstairs. From December 2018 to December 2019 it was a cat café and community centre.

In December 2024, after renovation, it opened as The Complex, a nightclub and live venue.
