= Pacific Coliseum =

Indoor arena in Vancouver, Canada

- "The Coliseum" "The Rink on Renfrew"
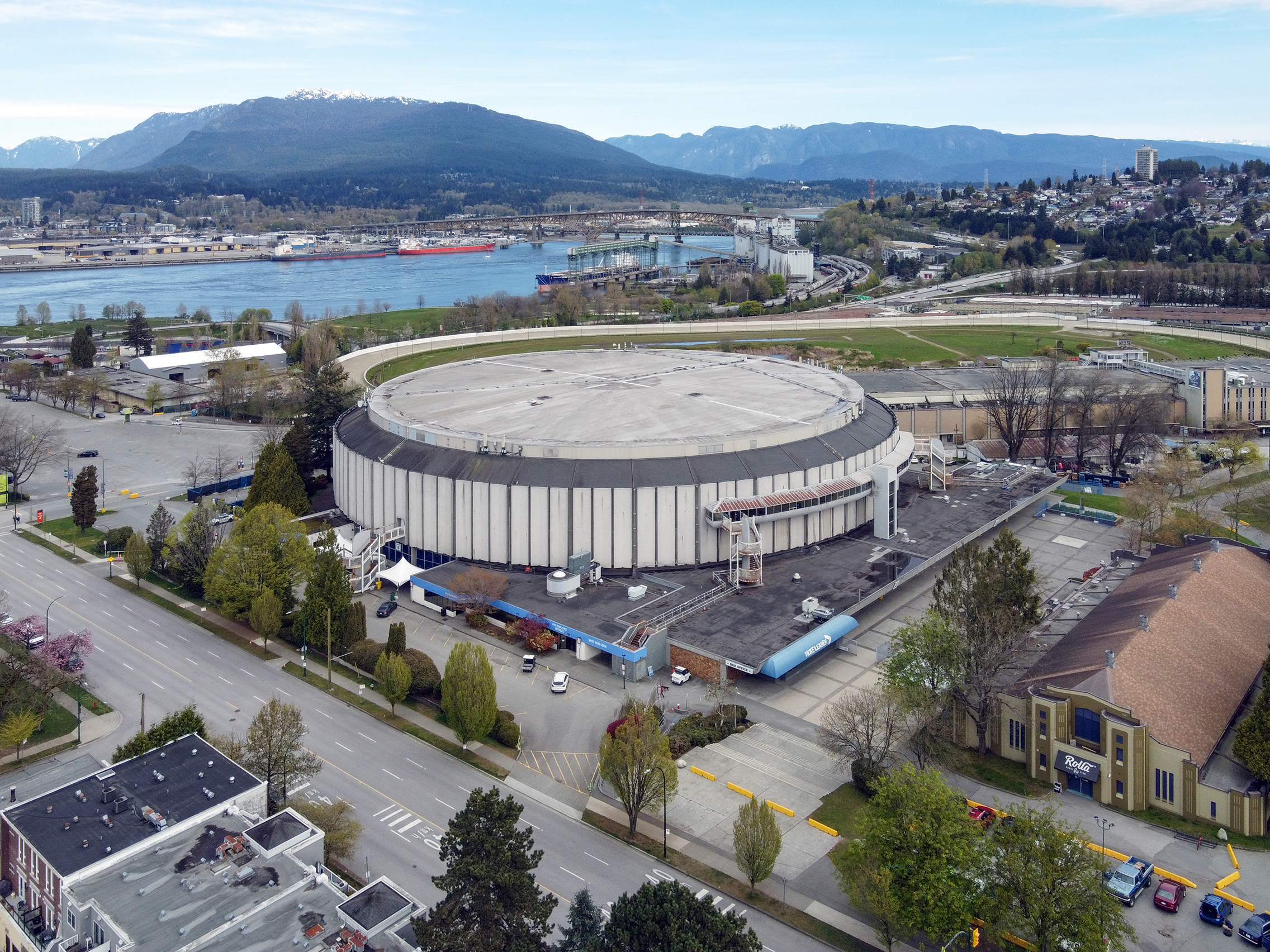
- Interactive map of Pacific Coliseum
- Address: 100 North Renfrew Street
- Location: Vancouver, British Columbia, Canada
- Coordinates: 49°17′9″N 123°2′34″W
- Owner: City of Vancouver Pacific National Exhibition
- Capacity: Ice hockey: 15,041; Concerts: 17,500

Construction
- Groundbreaking: 1966
- Opened: January 8, 1968
- Renovated: 1984, 2007
- Expanded: 1984
- Cost: C$6 million ($52.4 million in 2025 dollars)
- Architects: Phillips, Barratt, Hillier, Jones and Partners; W. K. Noppe
- General contractor: CANA Construction

Tenants
- Vancouver Canucks (WHL) (1968–1970); Vancouver Canucks (NHL) (1970–1995); Vancouver Nats (WHL) (1971–1973); Vancouver Blazers (WHA) (1973–1975); Vancouver Whitecaps (NASL Indoor) (1980–1981, 1983–1984); Vancouver Voodoo (RHI) (1994–1995); Vancouver Giants (WHL) (2001–2016); Vancouver Goldeneyes (PWHL) (2025–present)

Pacific Coliseum, locally known as The Coliseum or the Rink on Renfrew, is an indoor arena located at Hastings Park in Vancouver, British Columbia, Canada. Its main use has been for ice hockey and the arena has been the home for several ice hockey teams.

Currently the home of the Vancouver Goldeneyes of the Professional Women's Hockey League (PWHL), the arena was best known as the home of the Vancouver Canucks of the National Hockey League (NHL), from 1970 to 1995. Other hockey tenants of the Pacific Coliseum have been the Vancouver Canucks (Western Hockey League) from 1968 to 1970, the Vancouver Nats (WHL) from 1972 to 1973, the Vancouver Blazers (World Hockey Association) from 1973 to 1975, the Vancouver Voodoo (Roller Hockey International) from 1994 to 1995, and the Vancouver Giants (WHL) from 2001 to 2016.

It was completed in 1968 on the site of the Pacific National Exhibition. Its architect and plans were also used for Edmonton's Northlands Coliseum. Originally holding 15,038 for ice hockey, capacity has fluctuated slightly over the years and currently holds 16,281. During the 2010 Olympic Winter Games, it was the venue for figure skating and short track speed skating. The arena also hosts a variety of concerts and other events.

== History ==
Designed by W. K. Noppe in 1966–67, with its simple geometric shape and distinctive ring of white panels, the building can be classified as formalist architecture. Used initially as home to the WHL's Vancouver Canucks, the building was used to attract an NHL franchise in 1970 and a World Hockey Association franchise in 1973. The Coliseum underwent renovations and additions in the late 1970s, but its role as host of an NHL team and a main venue for events in Vancouver was lost with the construction and opening of General Motors Place (now Rogers Arena) in 1995.

The original centre-hung scoreclock was replaced during the 1985 renovations (this renovation work included seismic upgrades to the facility) by a new four-sided centre-hung scoreclock with colour matrix animation/matrix displays along with electronic message boards across the bottom on each side (the original sponsors for this clock were Imperial Tobacco and Molson Brewery), which in 2007 was replaced by a four-sided Daktronics scoreboard with a video display on each side.

Recent renovations were completed in 2007 to upgrade accessibility, seating, HVAC, and ice surface for its use as a venue for the 2010 Winter Olympics. During the renovations prior to the Olympics major upgrades were done to the ice plant at Pacific Coliseum. The adjacent Agrodome ice plant was decommissioned and both buildings now share the same system located at the Coliseum.

In early 2023 the Pacific Coliseum retired its scoreclock, donating it to the Sunshine Coast Junior Hockey Society in Gibson, British Columbia. Video screens were added to the north end of the arena and concourse walls.

In June 2023 a $2.6 million lighting project installed LED lighting around the exterior walls of the venue, allowing the arena to light up with different colours to recognize different events, dates and occasions.

=== Seating capacity ===
The seating capacity for hockey has progressed as follows:

- 15,038 (1968–1970)
- 15,570 (1970–1978)
- 16,413 (1978–1982)
- 16,553 (1983–1989)
- 16,123 (1989–1992)
- 16,150 (1992–2006)
- 16,281 (2006–2025)
- 15,041 (2025–present)

== Sports ==
The arena hosted the fourth game of the 1972 Summit Series on September 8, when the Soviet Union defeated Canada 5–3. In a famous post-game interview, Phil Esposito voiced his displeasure with the Vancouver crowd's reaction to their loss in an interview that was broadcast on national television.

The WHA Vancouver Blazers started playing at the Coliseum in 1973 when local businessman Jim Pattison bought the team from the Philadelphia Blazers ownership team. The team would last two years before moving to Calgary, becoming the Calgary Cowboys and fold in 1977.

The Coliseum played host to the 2001 Mann Cup, where the hosting WLA Coquitlam Adanacs defeated MSL's Brampton Excelsiors in seven games.

=== 2010 Winter Olympics ===
The Coliseum played host to figure skating and short-track speed skating events for the XXI Olympic Winter Games in Vancouver, from February 12 to 28, 2010.

=== Vancouver Canucks ===
The arena hosted its first NHL game on October 9, 1970, where the Los Angeles Kings defeated the Vancouver Canucks 3–1 in the Canucks' NHL debut. The Kings' Bob Berry scored the first goal, with Barry Wilkins scoring the first goal for the Canucks. Its final NHL game was played May 27, 1995, with the Chicago Blackhawks defeating the Canucks 4–3 to sweep them out of the 1995 Stanley Cup Playoffs in the second round.

The 25-year tenure of the Canucks would see the Stanley Cup Final come to the Coliseum twice; once in 1982, where the New York Islanders would complete their sweep of the Canucks in Vancouver on May 16, 1982, and again in 1994 where they would lose to the New York Rangers in a seven-game thriller. Former owner Arthur Griffiths called the sixth game of the 1994 series, the only Stanley Cup Final game that the Canucks would ever win at the Coliseum, to be "The greatest game ever played at the Pacific Coliseum," and sent the entire city into a frenzy in its wake. The Coliseum would host a viewing of game seven, which the Canucks would lose by a goal, after Nathan LaFayette's potential tying shot went off the post.

Pacific Coliseum also played host to the 1977 NHL All-Star Game, which saw the Wales Conference All-Stars defeat the Campbell Conference All-Stars 4–3.

The final NHL goal scored in the arena belongs to the Chicago Blackhawks' Chris Chelios, as the Blackhawks completed a four-game sweep of the Canucks in the 1995 Stanley Cup Playoffs' second round. Roman Oksiuta scored the Canucks' last goal in the building.

=== Junior hockey ===
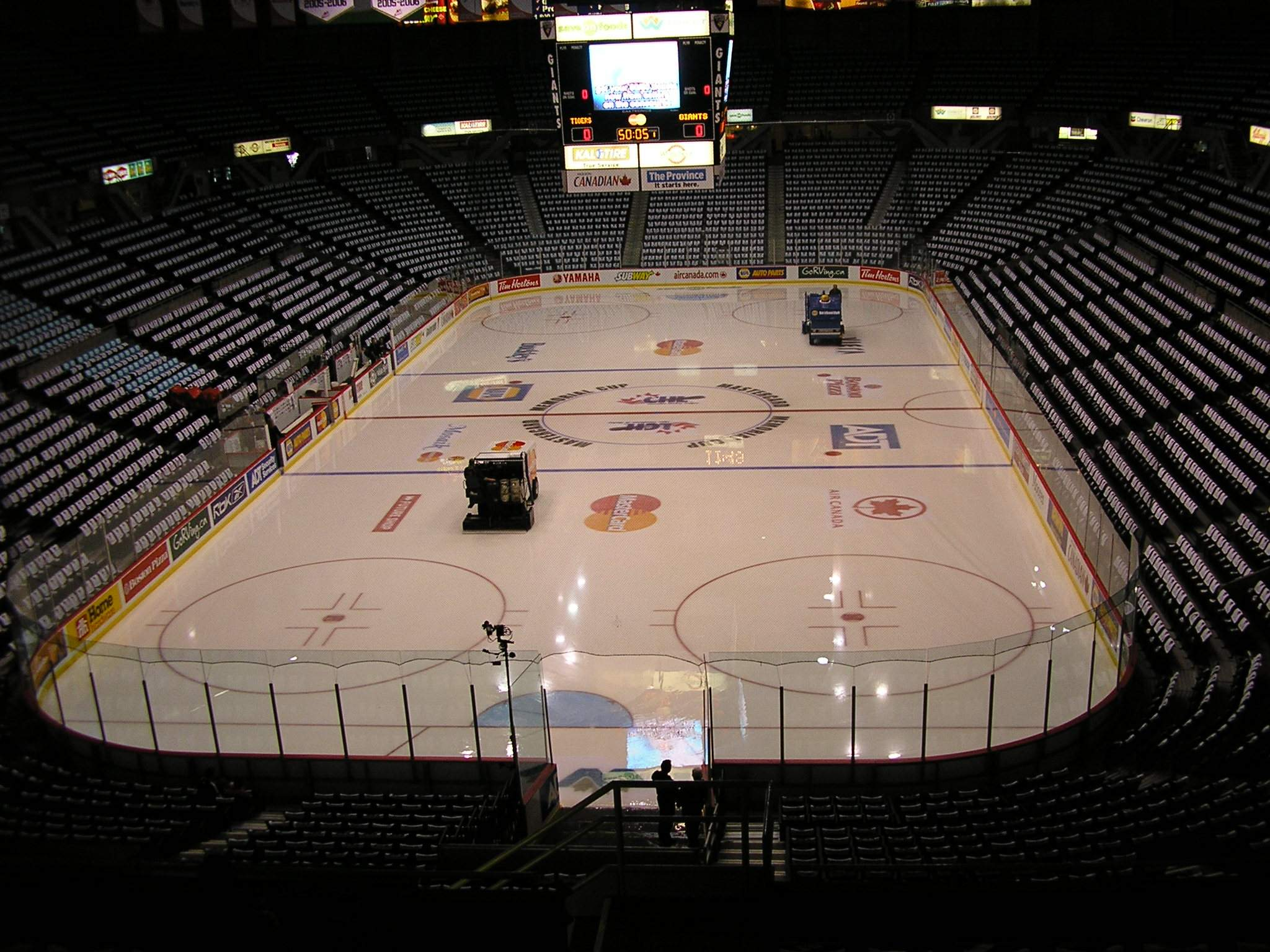
Towels laid out on each seat at the Pacific Coliseum prior to the 2007 Memorial Cup final.

Pacific Coliseum first hosted the Memorial Cup in 1977, when Stan Smyl and the New Westminster Bruins won their first Memorial Cup championship by defeating the Ottawa 67's, 6–5. Smyl would eventually have a successful thirteen-year NHL career playing with the Vancouver Canucks at the arena, eventually having his #12 retired by the team on November 3, 1991; the first number that the team would retire, and the only one retired by the Canucks during their time at the Coliseum.

After the departure of the Canucks in 1995, hockey returned to the Rink on Renfrew with the inaugural season of the WHL Vancouver Giants in 2001, where they would stay until dwindling attendance numbers would cause them to move to the Langley Events Centre after the 2015–16 season.

The arena was one of four arenas to play host to the 2006 World Junior Ice Hockey Championships, alongside Rogers Arena, Prospera Place in Kelowna, and the Sandman Centre in Kamloops.

In 2006, the Giants were chosen to host the 2007 Memorial Cup Tournament. During this tournament, the arena surpassed the all-time Memorial Cup attendance record; after seven round-robin games 91,808 attended, and the tournament would eventually finish with a total attendance of 121,461. In the same tournament, the Vancouver Giants won their first Memorial Cup championship, by defeating the WHL champion Medicine Hat Tigers, 3–1. The Giants had lost the WHL final in seven games to the Tigers earlier in the season.

=== Volleyball ===
The 2020 Men's Volleyball North American Olympic Qualification Tournament took place at the coliseum. Canada went 3–0 in the tournament, which qualified the team for the 2020 Summer Olympics.

=== Boxing ===
This venue has hosted Muhammad Ali vs. George Chuvalo II on May 1, 1972, and Michael Spinks vs Oscar Rivadeneyra on November 25, 1983.

=== Tennis ===
Pacific Coliseum has hosted two Billie Jean King Cup of Tennis qualifying matches. Canada versus Latvia in 2022 and Canada versus Belgium in 2023.

=== Vancouver Goldeneyes ===
Pacific Coliseum is the new host of the Vancouver Goldeneyes, as of 2025. The team is the new primary tenant of the building, and is one of two expansion franchises of the Professional Women's Hockey League (PWHL) for the 2025–26 season.

== Other uses ==
=== Notable concerts ===
On September 7, 1968 Jimi Hendrix performed at the Coliseum with his band The Jimi Hendrix Experience.

On December 28, 1968, rock group Led Zeppelin opened for Vanilla Fudge. This would be the first of several concerts for the band at the Pacific Coliseum over the next decade. Led Zeppelin would go on to base several of their North American tour operations from Vancouver and the Pacific Coliseum in the early 1970s.

Three Dog Night appeared at the Coliseum with opening act Hoyt Axton on January 24, 1970.

On June 6, 1970 the Doors performed at the Coliseum with Albert King as part of their Roadhouse Blues Tour. The show was recorded and released as a live album Live in Vancouver 1970.

On Jun 25, 1971 the Yes performed their Yes Album Tour, one of two Canadian dates, at the Coliseum. There was only 3 concerts that year, the other bands (on separate dates) were Led Zeppelin and Jethro Tull.

In 1972, The Rolling Stones opened their tour in support of their iconic album Exile On Main Street at the Pacific Coliseum. The band performed "Ventilator Blues" off the Exile album for the only time in their storied career at this concert. Stevie Wonder performed as the opening act.

On June 22, 1973, and May 17, 1974, the Coliseum hosted the Grateful Dead in an iconic set of performances featured in their album of live concerts, 'Pacific Northwest '73 - '74: Believe It If You Need It.'

On November 2, 1974, George Harrison performed the first of a series of concerts that would form his infamous Dark Horse Tour. This tour marked not only the first North American Tour by a former-Beatle, but also Harrison's last tour for 17 years.

On July 30, 1977 Emerson, Lake & Palmer played at Pacific Coliseum, Vancouver, BC, Canada during their Works Tour '77

The Bee Gees played here on July 15, 1979, during the first leg of their North American Spirits Having Flown Tour.

ABBA performed here on September 15, 1979, the second concert of their 1979 North American Tour.

KISS performed at the PNE Coliseum twice in their 1970s heyday. The first was on July 24, 1977 "Love Gun Tour" with Cheap Trick as the opening act. The second was on November 19, 1979, during the "Dynasty Tour", with Vancouver's own Loverboy, in their first live performance, as the opening act.

Cheap Trick returned as a headliner on August 3, 1980, with Loverboy as opening act.

Bob Marley and the Wailers played the Coliseum on November 21, 1979, in support of his Survival Tour.

Devo performed at the Coliseum on November 30, 1981, as part of their New Traditionalists tour.

Aerosmith played at the Coliseum on January 20, 1988, on August 14, 1993, and on October 25, 1997.

Nazareth recorded their live album 'Snaz there in May 1981.

Britney Spears played to a sold-out crowd on her Dream Within A Dream Tour on May 28, 2002.

David Bowie's performances, during his Serious Moonlight Tour, on September 11–12, 1983, were filmed and released, on VHS and LaserDisc, in 1984, and re-released, as a DVD, in 2006.

MC Hammer performed on December 15, 1990, as part of his Please Hammer Don't Hurt 'Em World Tour.

American band Pearl Jam played at the arena on September 25, 2011, as part of the band's 20th anniversary celebrations.

Alexisonfire played in the Coliseum on December 17, 2012, for their farewell tour.

On April 30, 2022, Indian singer Babbu Maan became the first South Asian artist to sell out the Pacific Coliseum.

=== Filming ===
The Coliseum was used for the Madison Square Garden scene in the movie Miracle as well as Slam Dunk Ernest. The dog show scenes from Best in Show were filmed at the Coliseum. The final shot of first look trailer for the Nintendo Switch was filmed here. The television show A Million Little Things has used the arena to film scenes that are taking place in TD Garden. The concert scene at the end of the 2001 film Josie and the Pussycats was filmed at the Coliseum.

=== Political demonstrations ===
On October 16, 1970, the anti-nuclear protest group Don't Make a Wave Committee held a concert at the Pacific Coliseum and managed to raise funds for a demonstration against nuclear testing by the United States. The demonstration marked the beginning of the environmental organization Greenpeace.

=== Religious gatherings ===
On November 14–16, 1978, His Highness Prince Aga Khan, 49th Imam of Ismaili Muslims gave a series of audiences or mulaqats to the Ismaili community of British Columbia.

On July 26, 1982, to commemorate the foundation ceremony of the Ismaili Centre Vancouver, His Highness Prince Aga Khan, 49th Imam of Ismaili Muslims gave an audience or mulaqat to the Ismaili community of British Columbia.

On April 22, 1983, during the commemoration of his Silver Jubilee His Highness Prince Aga Khan, 49th Imam of Ismaili Muslims together with the Begum Aga Khan and his brother Prince Amyn Aga Khan gave an audience or mulaqat to the Ismaili community of British Columbia.

=== Esports ===
The Pacific Coliseum hosted the League of Legends Championship Series Spring 2017 North American Finals on April 22 and 23, 2017, where Team SoloMid retained its NALCS title against Cloud9 in a five-game series. Usually hosted in Santa Monica, California, it was the second consecutive time that a North American LCS final was held in Canada, after Toronto hosted the Summer 2016 final.

From 27 June to 12 July 2025, the Coliseum hosted the 2025 Mid-Season Invitational, which was Canada's first hosting of a League of Legends international competition.

=== Superdogs ===
During the Pacific National Exhibition fair, a show with dogs called "The Superdogs" is held. During the show, dogs participate in all sorts of competition: dancing, running or jumping.

Preceded by first arena	Home of the Vancouver Giants; 2001–2016	Succeeded by Langley Events Centre
Preceded by PNE Forum	Home of the Vancouver Canucks; 1968–1995	Succeeded by General Motors Place
Preceded by PNE Agrodome	Home of the Vancouver Voodoo; 1994–1995	Succeeded by General Motors Place
Preceded by Philadelphia Civic Center	Home of the Vancouver Blazers; 1973–1975	Succeeded by Stampede Corral
Preceded by The Spectrum	Host of the NHL All-Star Game; 1977	Succeeded by Buffalo Memorial Auditorium
