= Paul Gregg =

British businessman (born 1941)

- Born: 1941 (age 84–85); Scarborough, North Yorkshire
- Occupations: Businessman and entertainment impresario
- Known for: Creating Apollo Leisure Group

Paul Gregg (born 1941 in Scarborough, North Yorkshire) is a businessman and entertainment impresario, who built Apollo Leisure Group into the UK's biggest theatre owner and largest independent family run cinema chain in the United Kingdom

After selling Apollo to SFX Group in 1999, and leaving new owners Clear Channel, he was a large stake holder in Everton F.C., before falling out with former friend Bill Kenwright in 2004, and selling his stake in October 2006 to Robert Earl.

== Apollo Leisure Group ==
Gregg's early career was in ABC cinema followed by managing a Social Club at Cowley at the huge British Leyland site. Moving up north to Southport, Gregg became the Director of Tourism and Attractions for Southport. During his time working for Sefton Council, the Southport Theatre Complex was built adjacent to the Floral Hall venue. This provided the town with two venues that went on to host some huge stars performing that had never before been seen in Southport. Following his departure from Sefton and a brief post with the Prince of Wales Hotel group, an opportunity came in 1977, aged 36, to purchase the Ardwick Theatre in Manchester – soon followed by the New Theatre in Oxford – and so Apollo Leisure had lift off, and gradually over the following years Apollo became the biggest theatre owners/management team in the United Kingdom.

Gregg built his empire by taking over struggling venues and turning them round. The Liverpool Empire Theatre, which was losing £750,000 a year under the Derek Hatton led council, was leased to become a home to big musicals. Gregg also reopened the Lyceum in London in the 1990s at a cost of £14 million, after the theatre had been closed for 10 years. Andrew Lloyd Webber's revival of Jesus Christ Superstar ran for two years, followed by Disney's The Lion King. On 28 September 1982 in association with friend Bill Kenwright, Gregg co-produced a production of The Mikado at the Cambridge Theatre, London.

The eventual portfolio of venues included The Point Theatre in Dublin, the Sheffield Arena and Wales National Ice Rink in Cardiff; as well as 23 theatres nationwide, including: Hammersmith Apollo, the Apollo Victoria and the Lyceum in London; the Bristol Hippodrome; the Edinburgh Playhouse; the Old Fire Station and Apollo in Oxford; Grand Opera House in York; the Opera House, Palace and Apollo Ardwick in Manchester; the Liverpool Empire and the Floral Hall in Southport. Apollo also owned Tickets Direct, which sold around £6 million theatre and concert tickets in 1999.

On 6 August 1999, Apollo accepted a takeover offer from the American entertainment corporation SFX for £158 million, because: "We were running a family business and suddenly we realised there were 5,000 people in the family." Gregg and his family owned 80% of the company, and received between them £126 million worth of shares and loan stock in SFX. SFX also agreed to acquire The Barry Clayman Corporation, 50% owned by the shareholders of Apollo, which promotes concert and entertainment events, and whose European tour artists include: Riverdance, Michael Jackson, Neil Diamond, Barbra Streisand, Shirley Bassey and Tom Jones.

Paul Gregg stayed on, becoming European Chairman of the enlarged SFX group. Gregg approached producer David Ian to head up the theatre division, but Ian refused. After, the SFX Entertainment division was acquired by Clear Channel in 2000. Gregg eventually persuaded Ian to join the group by absorbing Ian's joint venture with actor Paul Nicholas, and made Ian head of the European Theatre group before he left. Ian took over Gregg's role as European managing director of Entertainment at Clear Channel.

== Apollo Cinemas ==
In 2004, Gregg bought back the Apollo Cinemas chain from Clear Channel for £23 million, before the European theatres were spun out into sister company Live Nation. Apollo instantly became the largest independently owned UK cinema chain, operating from 13 locations and having 78 screens and four bingo halls.

Apollo also announced plans to open London's first West End multiplex cinema in a decade. A new five-screen complex will be part of a £70 million scheme to enhance lower Regent Street. Four more new regional complexes are under development.

Together, cinemas and bingo generated pre-tax profits of about £1.5 million on turnover of £12.2 million in the year to 25 March 2004. From this, the Paul Gregg took £240,000 in dividends.

== Everton F.C. ==
Paul Gregg invested £7 million in True Blue Holdings Ltd, which took the majority share holding in Everton F.C. in 2000 from former chairman Peter Johnson. Gregg first came to the attention of Everton fans, when he became the main driver behind the King's Dock scheme, promising to plough in an additional £30 million to get the project moving.

== Apollo Resorts & Leisure ==
Gregg's company recently won the first new large casino licence to be awarded in the UK winning the new licence for Manor Mills, Hull. The company have just recently completed a successful application in Middlesbrough and are short listed for licences in Bath and Milton Keynes.
