= The Playhouse, Colchester =

Wetherspoon's pub and former theatre and cinema in Colchester, Essex, England

Coordinates: 51.8875°N 0.8969°E

The Playhouse is a Wetherspoon's pub in Colchester, Essex, the building of which was previously The Playhouse Theatre. Originally opened in 1929, the theatre became the A.B.C. in the 1960s, and it was redeveloped into a pub in 1994.

== History ==
The Playhouse Theatre was built in 1929 by John Fairweather; and the first production in 1929 was the Winter Garden Theatre's So This Is Love. In 1930, The Playhouse became a cinema, the interior was redesigned in 1931, and in 1932, the cinema was taken over by Associated British Cinemas. The building was redeveloped in 1962, and renamed the A.B.C. In 1981, the building was taken over by EMI, who used it as a bingo hall. After renovation, the building reopened as a Wetherspoon's pub in 1994.
