= George Green (businessman) =

George Green (1861–1915), was a British cinema pioneer.

== Early life ==
George Green was born in Preston in 1861, the son of a master cabinet maker.

== Career ==
He started his career as an apprenticed to a watchmaker, but through a bad debt owed to his father, came to own a fairground carousel and slowly built this into a number of travelling shows. Green chose Glasgow as a base for his travelling show business and ran his first moving picture show at Christmas Carnival in 1896.

== Personal life ==
His sons Fred Green and Bert Green joined him in business after leaving school, and by 1920 had become the most successful cinema proprietors and film renters in Scotland, before opening cinemas, Green's Playhouse.
