= Edinburgh Playhouse =

Edinburgh theatre

Coordinates: 55°57′25″N 3°11′7″W

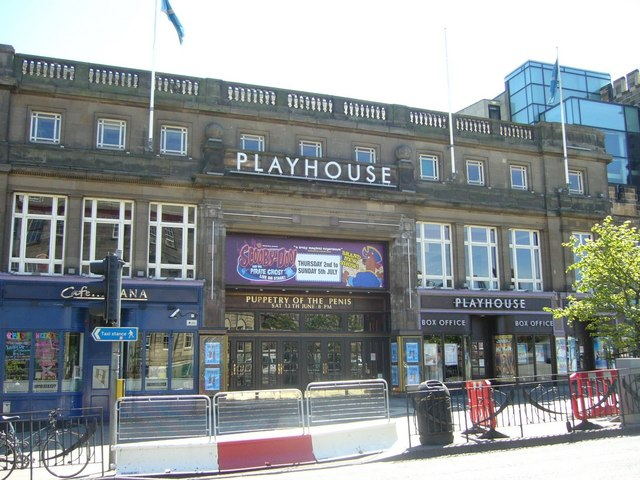
- Edinburgh Playhouse in 2009
- Interactive map of Edinburgh Playhouse
- Address: 18–22 Greenside Place
- Location: Edinburgh, Scotland
- Owner: Ambassador Theatre Group
- Capacity: 3,059
- Designation: Listed Building Category A
- Current use: Theatre
- Production: Touring Productions

Construction
- Opened: 1929
- Reopened: 1980
- Architect: John Fairweather

Website
- www.atgtickets.com/venues/edinburgh-playhouse/

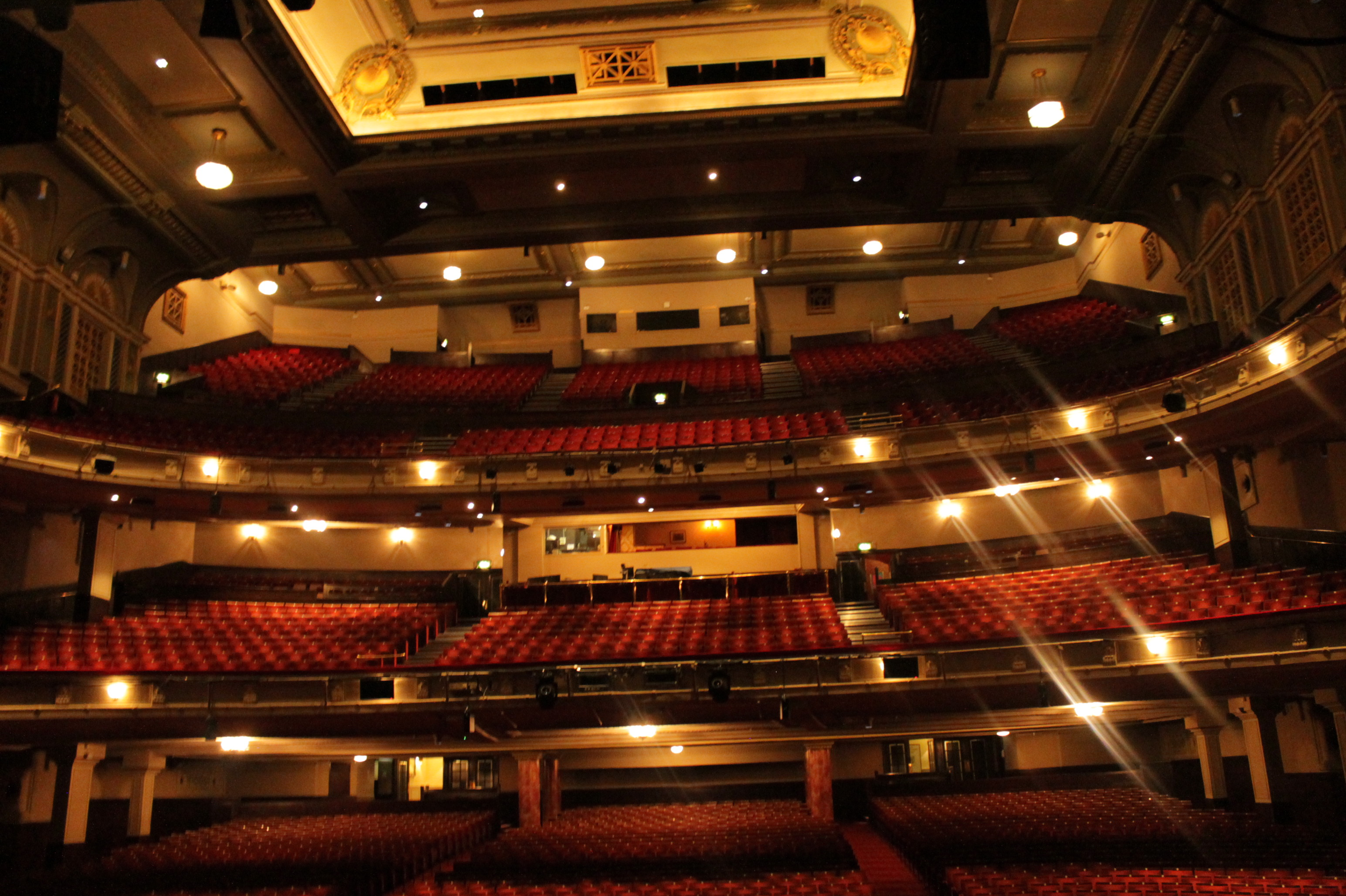
Edinburgh Playhouse – The auditorium from the stage

Edinburgh Playhouse is a theatre in Edinburgh, Scotland. With 3,059 seats (Note: Stalls 1,519, Balcony 860 and Circle 680) it is the largest theatre in Scotland and second largest in the United Kingdom, after the Hammersmith Apollo. The theatre is owned by Ambassador Theatre Group.

== Building history ==
The theatre opened on 12 August 1929 as a super-cinema, and was modelled on the Roxy Cinema in New York. It was designed by the specialist cinema architect John Fairweather, most famous for his Green's Playhouse cinema in Glasgow. The original colour scheme was described on opening as follows:

"Tones of ivory and stone predominate on the walls, and the roof is decorated with bands of pale green leaves intersected with gold at intervals. The seats in the different parts of the house have been upholstered to harmonise with the general scheme of the decoration. The organ fronts are in Venetian style, and the clock settings, which are square, are neat and attractive."

The cinema closed down in the early 1970s. Following a threat of demolition, a public campaign achieved a petition of 15,000 signatures which resulted in the building being listed as Category B in 1974. The cinema was then converted into a theatre between 1978 and 1980 by the Lothian Region Architects Department. In 1983, the theatre was sold by Edinburgh District Council into private ownership. The theatre was owned respectively by Norman Springford, Apollo Leisure Group, SFX and Clear Channel Entertainment before coming to its current owners, ATG in 2009.

The listed status of the building was upgraded by Historic Scotland to Category A in 2008.

== Performances ==
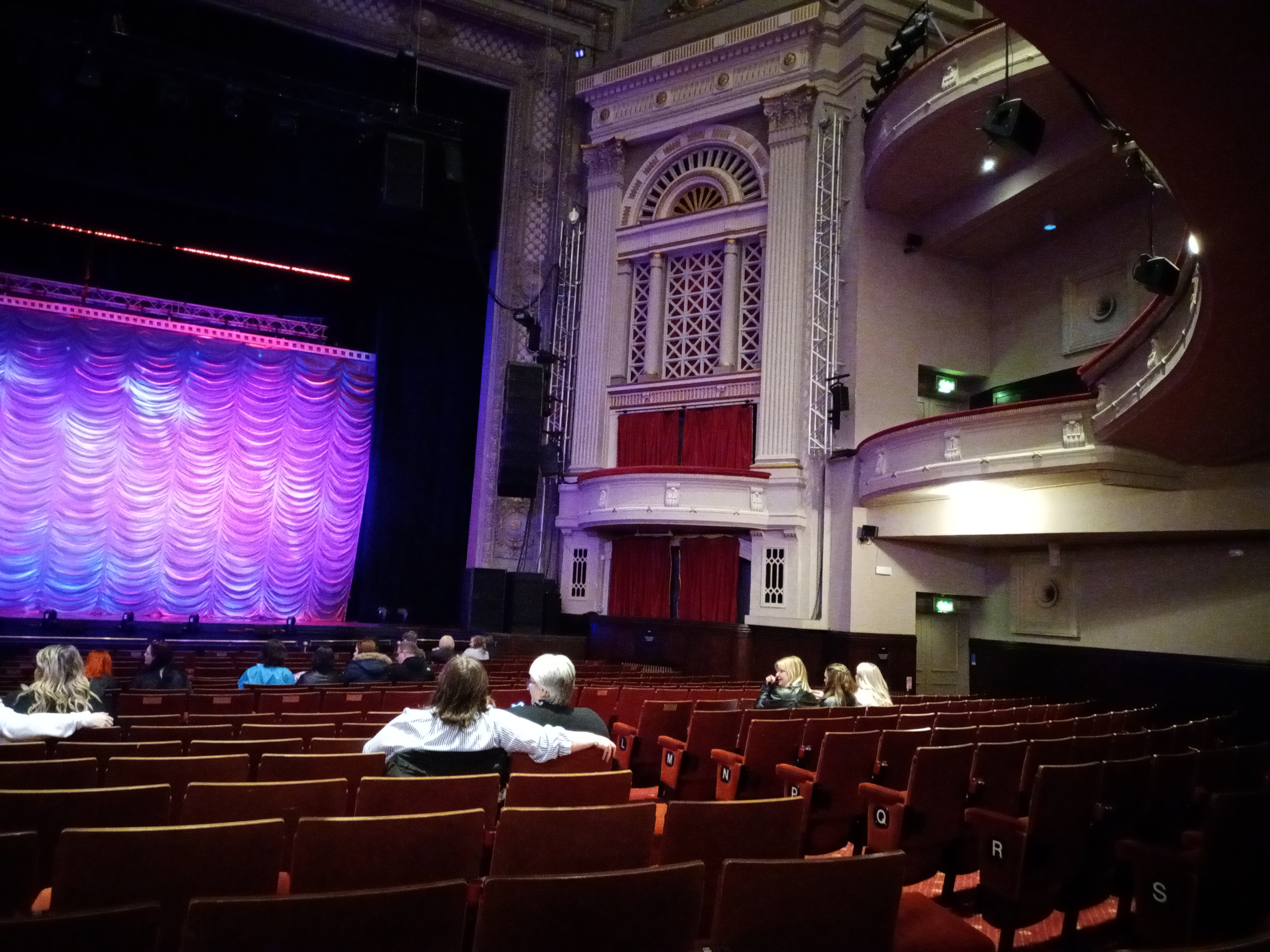
Edinburgh Playhouse stage and right hand box in 2023

In recent years, The Playhouse has played host to a wide variety of artists and shows.

It also caters to the youth of the surrounding area who are involved in stage experience projects and youth musicals projects in which children as young as 10, and young adults as old as 21, can take part in shows on the stage.

It is used as a venue for both the Edinburgh International Festival and Edinburgh Festival Fringe each August. It was previously used as a venue for the wrestling and weightlifting events at the 1986 Commonwealth Games.

== Technical details ==
The front of house sound position is somewhat unusually located at the rear of the Dress Circle. Towards the rear of the stalls, there is 41 mm unistrut Product 221-724 fixed to the ceiling to facilitate the hanging delay speakers. In the Gallery there is also a winch bar across the full width of the auditorium to again facilitate the hanging of delay speakers. The theatre now benefits from a lift to bring up 45' trailers and tractor units up to stage level, which is three floors below street level at the rear of the theatre.

== Ghost ==
The building is said to be haunted by a ghost called Albert, a man in a grey coat who appears on level six accompanied by a chill in the air. He also haunts the Albert’s Bar on circle level, according to staff of the theatre, he has been seen numerous times as a grey outline or a shadow. He is variously said to have been either a stagehand who was killed in an accident or a night-watchman who committed suicide.

== See also ==
- List of Category A listed buildings in Edinburgh
- List of Edinburgh music venues
- List of theatres in Scotland
