= Play House (DJ) =

French DJ and music producer (born 1993)

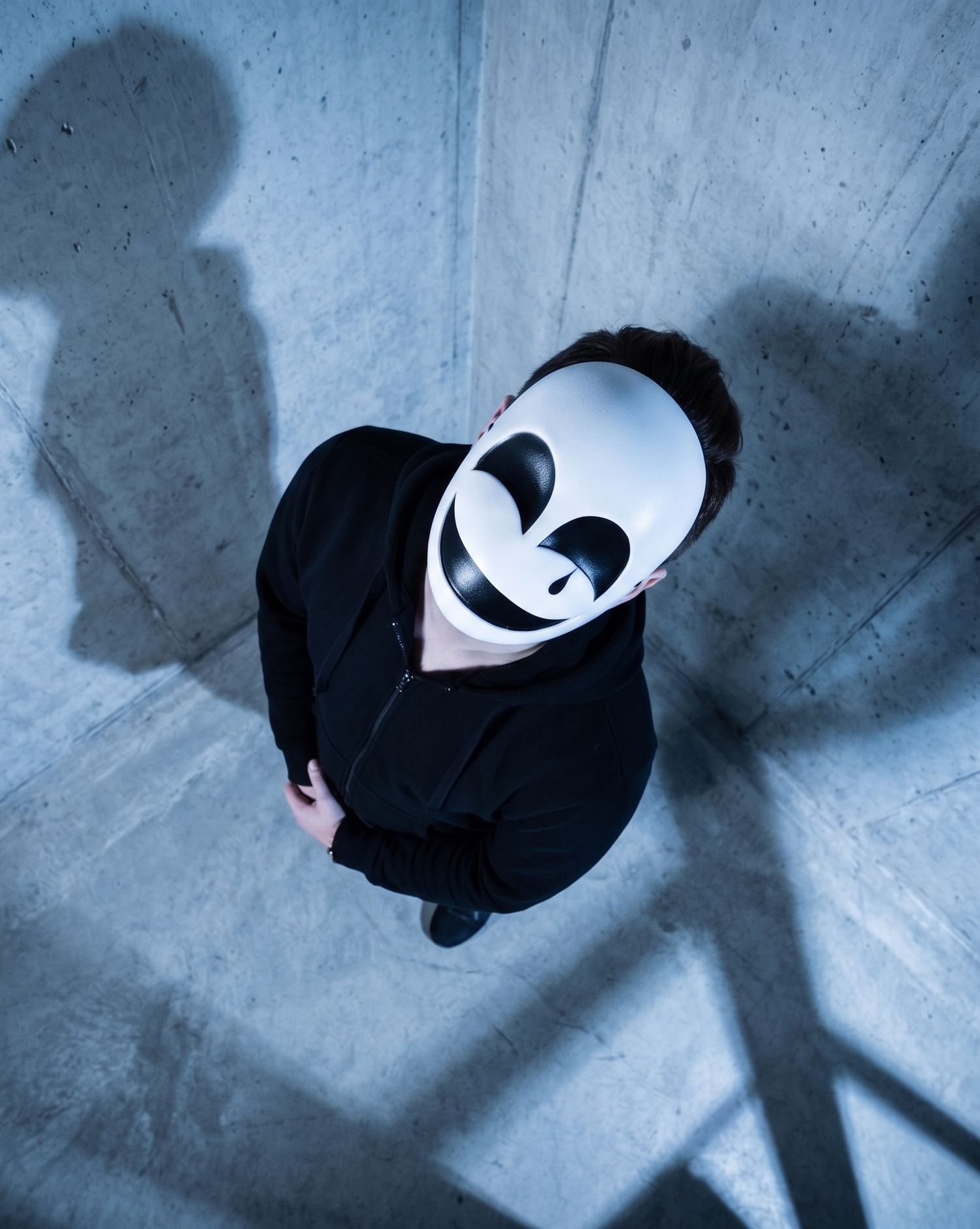
- Play House in 2026

Background information
- Origin: Paris, France
- Genres: House; Afro house; Deep house
- Occupations: DJ; Record producer
- Years active: 2020–present
- Label: Play House Sound
- Website: playhousesound.com

Play House (French pronunciation: [plɛ uːs]) is a DJ and music producer based in Paris, France. He produces house music, with influences from afro house and deep house styles.

== Career ==
Play House began performing in the Paris electronic music scene and is associated with the contemporary French house movement. Between 2024 and 2026, he performed at several Parisian venues, including Titi Palacio, Le Beho, and The People Belleville. He has performed internationally, with appearances in the electronic music scene of Malmö, Sweden.

By 2026, his work gained expanded international FM radio rotation, notably in Italy on stations such as Radio Dance Network and Primantenna FM, in Algeria on Ifrikya FM and Misk FM.

He is the founder of the electronic record label Play House Sound, which organizes house, afro house, and minimal electronic music events in Paris. DJ Play House is considered part of a generation of French house producers contributing to the evolution of the Paris electronic music scene. Play House distributes most of his music via open-access repositories and streaming platforms to bypass financial barriers. This model aims to democratize electronic music for listeners and creators with limited resources.

In 2025, he released the single "Stop Calling Me," which incorporated elements of UK garage into his established house style. He also released the deep house single "FEEL", noted for its minimalist arrangement and groove-led rhythm. He then expanded his catalog with the track "WE", which incorporates influences from Michael Jackson and the collective Keinemusik.

His single "Trompeta Salvaje" was performed DJ Shinsky in Bali, Indonesia. His discography includes over 100 recordings, such as "Lego Acid Music Machine", "Marijuana", and an Afro-house remix of Bob Sinclar's "Take It Easy on Me". As of mid-2026, his work has surpassed 5 million streams across digital platforms, with a production style influenced by Black Coffee and HUGEL.

== Discography ==
=== Singles ===
- "Electro Phoenix" (2022)
- "Don't Let Me Go" (2023)
- "Play Techno" (2024)
- "WE" (2025)
- "Stop Calling Me" (2025)
- "FEEL" (2025)
- "Marijuana" (2025)
- "Carnaval Song" (2026)
