= John Fairweather =

British architect (1867–1942)

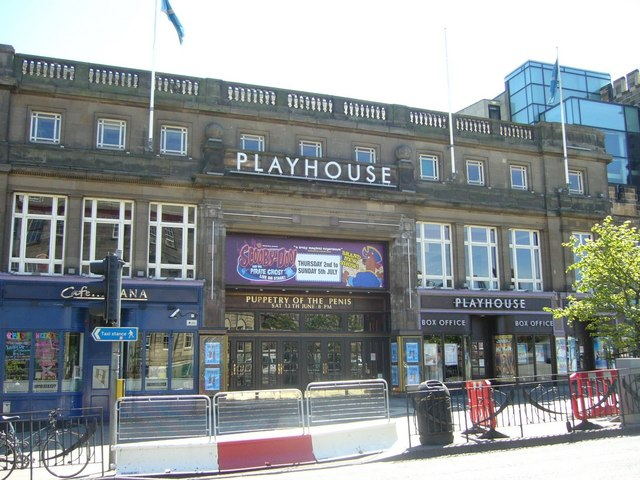
Edinburgh Playhouse, 2009

John Fairweather FRIBA (5 February 1867 – 13 January 1942) was a British architect who specialised in cinemas.

== Early life ==
John Fairweather was born on 5 February 1867, at 11 Franklin Terrace, Anderston, Glasgow, the son of John Fairweather, a farmer, draper and mercantile clerk in the wool trade from Alyth, and his wife Elizabeth Brown Fyfe who came from Leuchars in Fife. He trained in Glasgow and was articled as a trainee architect to James Milne Monro. He studied part-time at Glasgow School of Art.

In 1895 he set up practice alone from his house at 11 Bothwell Street in Glasgow. He mainly worked on Glasgow tenements for a local building firm. In 1903 he came to some notice in the Glasgow East End Industrial Exhibition and began to receive more commissions including libraries, churches and church halls. By 1916 when he was elected a Fellow of the RIBA he was living at "Glengarry", a villa in the Stepps district, and working at 136 Wellington Street.

== Career ==
Somewhere around 1914 he met George Green, a developer of cinemas. Fairweather became the in-house architect for the Green's Playhouse cinema chain. Green sent him on a long study trip to the United States in 1922/23 to look at cinema and theatre design, and in particular the work of Scots-born Thomas W. Lamb. This had a big impact on Fairweather and his style became much more flamboyant.

Fairweather was the architect of Green's Playhouse, which opened in Glasgow in 1927, and of the Edinburgh Playhouse which opened in 1927 and is the UK's largest working non-sporting theatre in terms of audience capacity. He designed The Playhouse, Colchester, Essex, which opened in 1929, and has been a Wetherspoon's pub since 1984.

The huge and iconic Green's Playhouse in Dundee dates from 1936 and survives as a bingo hall on the Nethergate. His Edinburgh Playhouse is perhaps his least ambitious work and presumably was restrained by the Edinburgh officials keen for it not to impact on views of Calton Hill.

== Family ==
Fairweather married Evelyn Ronaldson in 1906 and their son William John Fairweather, born in 1907, also became an architect, starting as an assistant to his father.

== Death ==
He was killed on 13 January 1942 during a wartime blackout, as a pedestrian crossing Cumbernauld Road in Stepps, being hit by a car with no lights. He is buried in Bedlay Cemetery in Moodiesburn.

== Principal works ==
- Townhead Public Library (1904)
- Cambuslang Higher Grade School (1908)
- Stepps Public School (1910)
- Gateside Public School, Cambuslang (1912)
- Stepps Parish Church Halls (1912)
- Vitagraph Cinema at 520 Sauchiehall Street (1912/14)
- Green's Pavilion Cinema, Rutherglen (1914)
- Green's Picturedrome, Tollcross, Glasgow (1914)
- Kings Cinema, Glasgow (1914)
- Remodelling of Boswell Park Roller Skate Pavilion, Ayr (1917)
- Pavilion Cinema, Bathgate (1920)
- Capitol Cinema, Ibrox, Glasgow (1925)
- Green's Playhouse, Renfield Street, Glasgow (1925)
- Playhouse Theatre, Edinburgh (1927)
- Green's Playhouse, Ayr (1929)
- Savoy Theatre, Cambuslang (1929)
- East Park Home for Infirm Children, Largs (c.1930)
- Regal Cinema, Dalmuir, Glasgow (1930)
- Regal cinema, Saltcoats (931)
- Rio Cinema, Rutherglen (1931)
- Rex Cinema in Lockerbie (1932)
- Concert Hall Montrose (1933)
- Ritz Cinema, Burton upon Trent (1934)
- Green's Playhouse, Dundee (1935)
- Largs Super Cinema (1935)
- Rio Cinema, Rutherglen (1935)
- British Linen Bank, Calton, Glasgow (1936)
- Picture House Cinema, Kirkconnel (1936)
- Cinema in Wigan (1937)
- Rex Cinema for Green, Campbeltown (1938) demolished
- Cinema in Saltcoats (1939)
- Green's Playhouse, Wishaw (1939) now a bingo hall

== Legacy ==
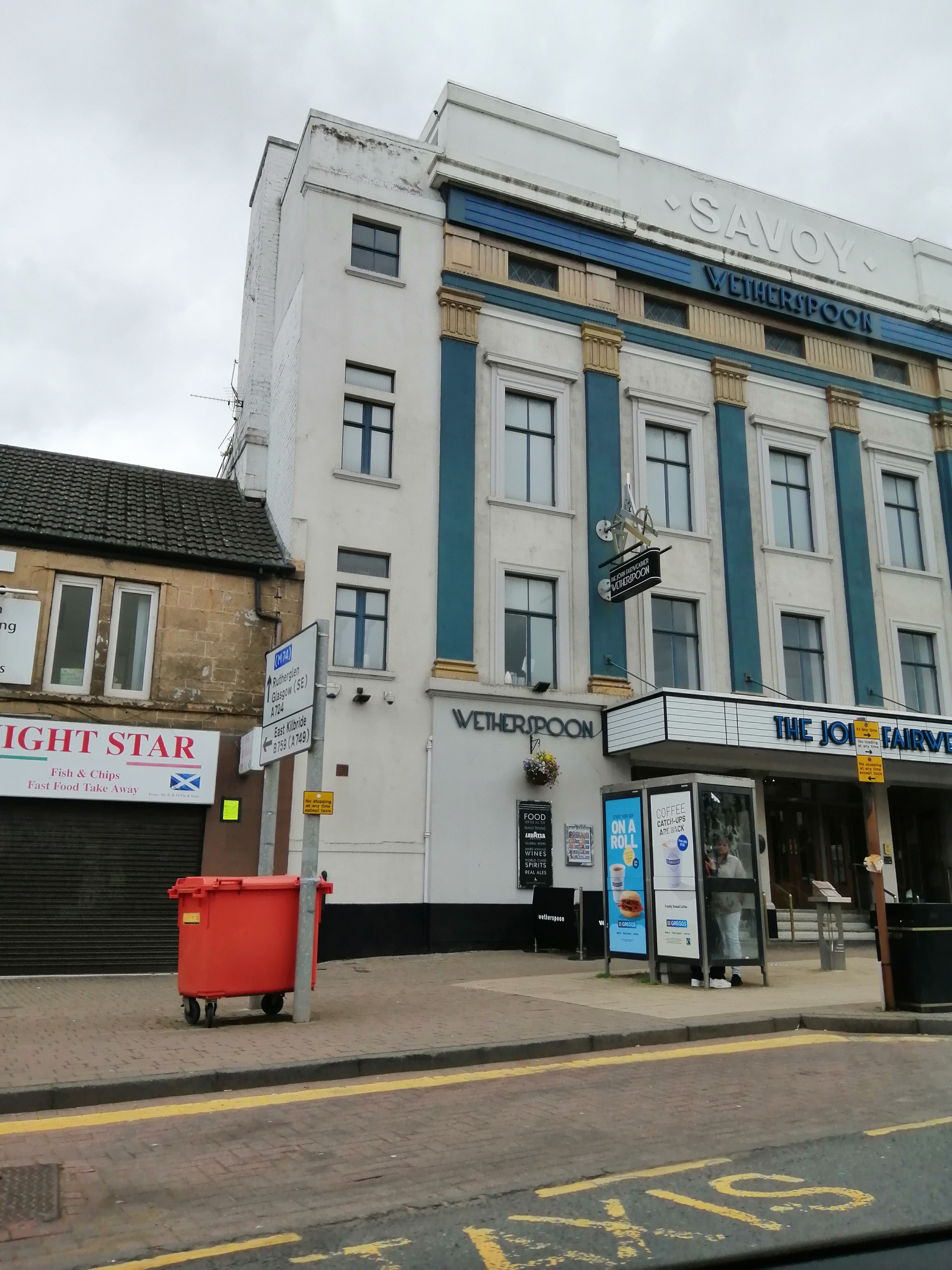
Wetherspoon's, Cambuslang

In April 2014, Wetherspoon's announced that the Savoy Cinema in Cambuslang, designed by Fairweather and built in 1929, and later a bingo hall in the 1960s, before closing in the 2000s, would become a pub named the John Fairweather, in his honour.
