= Orton & Spooner =

Manufacturer of fairground rides

Orton & Spooner was a company that made fairground rides and equipment for fairgrounds. The business began in the 1890s, and closed in 1977. It was based in Burton upon Trent in Staffordshire, England.

== History ==
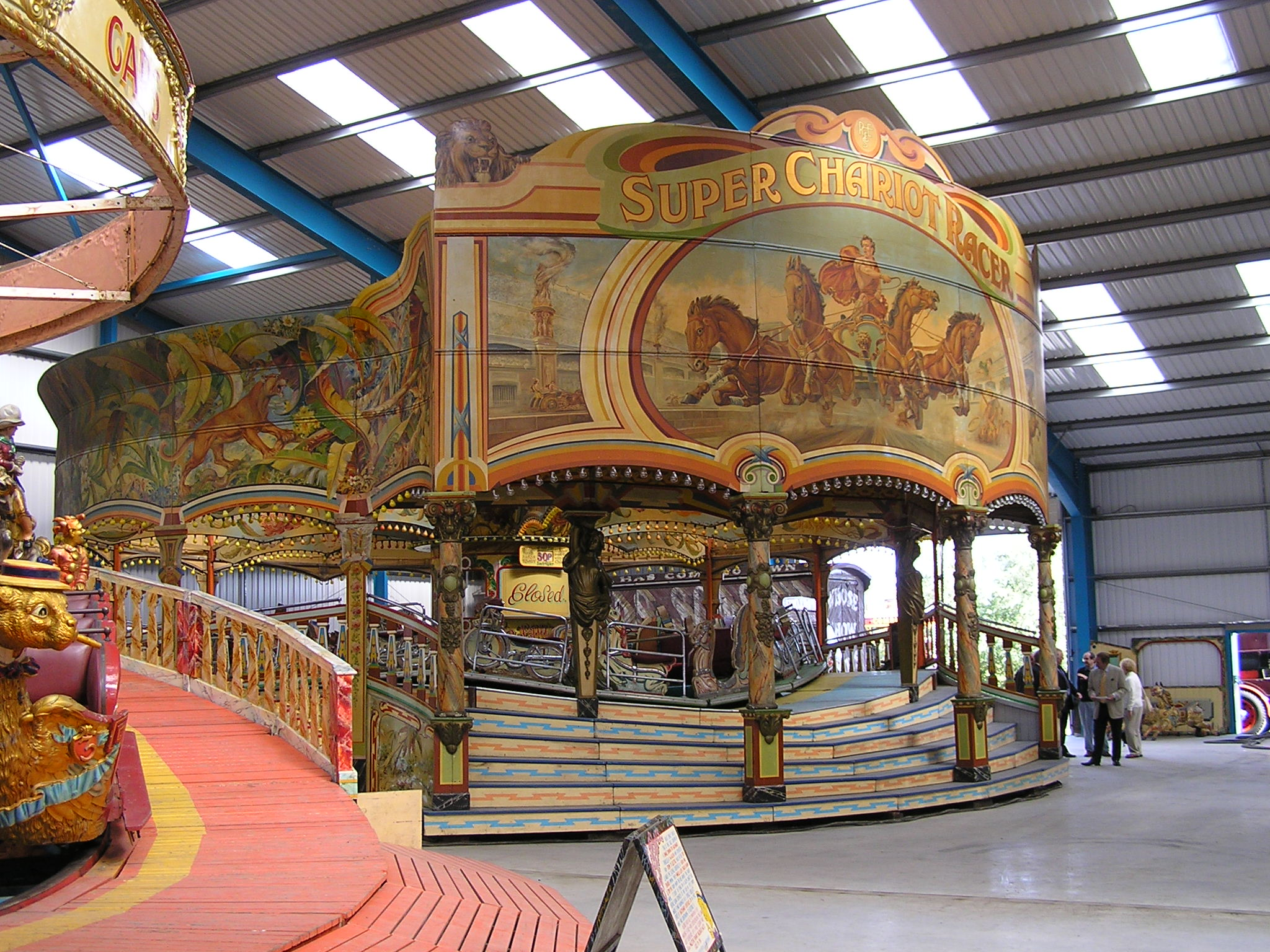
"Super Chariot Racer" by Orton & Spooner, made in 1934, on display at Dingles Fairground Heritage Centre in Devon

George Orton (1843–1924), born in Measham, Leicestershire, was a wheelwright and coachbuilder. In 1885 he established the Lion Carriage Works in Burton on Trent. From about 1883, most of his work was building living wagons for travelling showmen.

Charles Spooner (1871–1939), born in Burton, was a wood-carver, and at first made drays and handcarts for brewing companies in the town. He set up in business in 1892, and made carved work for showmen and builders of fairground rides, including animal figures for roundabouts. He was one of Orton's suppliers; from 1894 they worked together, and in 1897 he married Orton's daughter Rose Ann. He made carved work for the living wagons and showfronts produced by Orton. The showfronts were for travelling bioscopes (early cinemas).

George Orton retired in 1910, and the business was run by his sons Tom and Charles, his daughter Annie and Charles Spooner. The company in 1912 built erecting sheds on land he had bought in Victoria Crescent in Burton, large enough for a complete fairground ride. Elements for rides assembled here continued to be built at the Lion Works.

The most important fairground ride at this time was the "circular switchback", powered by steam. Orton & Spooner's main competitor was Frederick Savage of King's Lynn; after the closure of Savage about 1910, Orton & Spooner dominated the market. The "scenic railway", powered by electricity, became important: the first such ride by Orton & Spooner, with a circular undulating track, was built in 1912. Over twenty years they built, rebuilt or modified 32 scenic railways. From the late 1920s, the most important machines were smaller roundabouts, particularly "Noah's Arks", so called because of the various carved animals in the ride. They also made other fairground machines and side stalls.

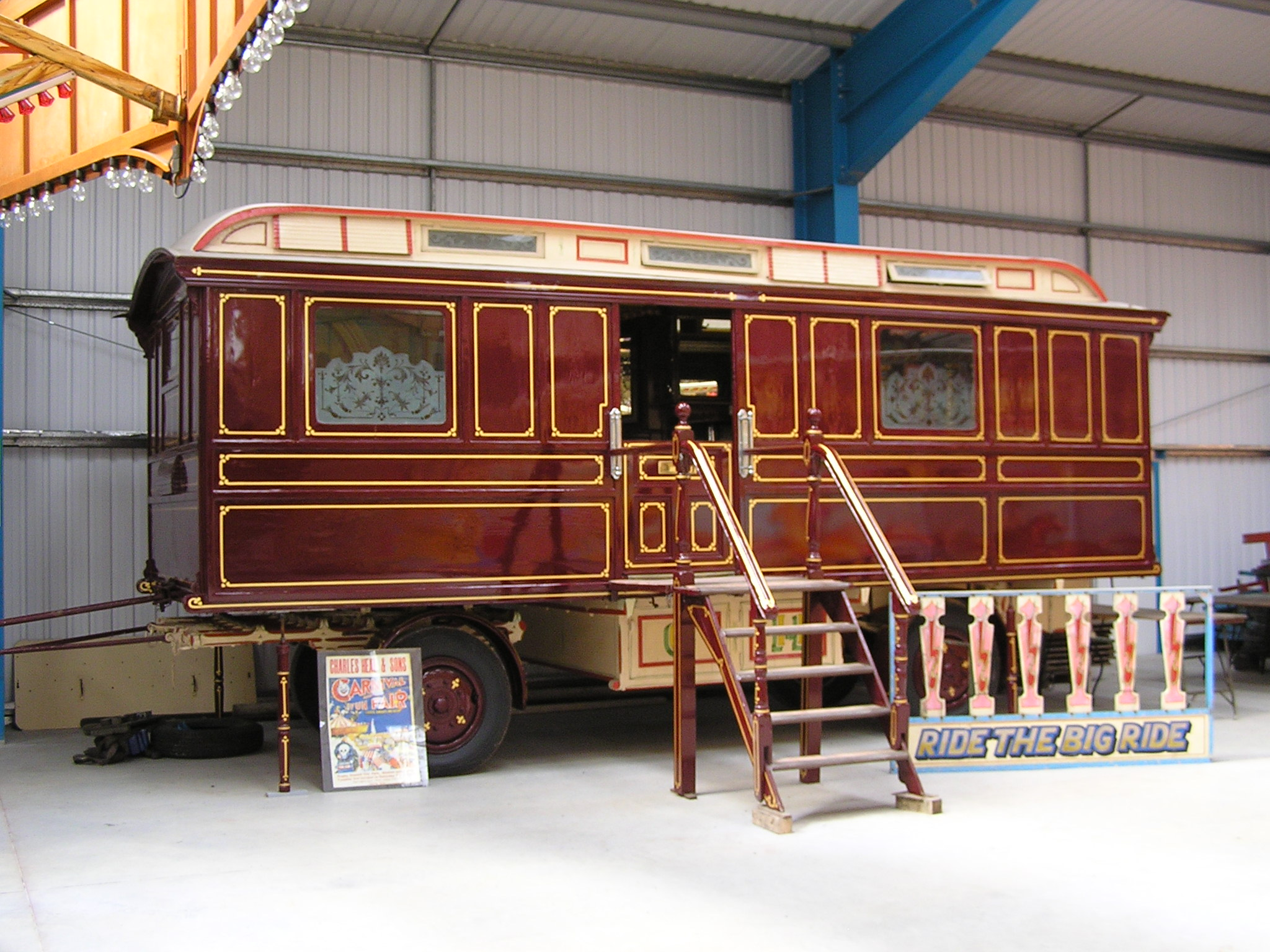
Living wagon by Orton & Spooner, built for showman Charles Heal, on display at Dingles Fairground Heritage Centre in Devon

Orton & Spooner established in 1913 The Burton Picturedrome Company Ltd, running cinemas in the town including the Picturedrome, built in 1913 (demolished in the 1930s), and the Ritz Cinema, built by the company in 1935, now a listed building.

During the First World War the company made portable aircraft hangars for the government. In 1924 a fire at the erecting sheds destroyed much material and valuable patterns. George Orton died two days later, aged 81. New erecting sheds were built on an adjacent site by 1926; they were large enough to contain two complete roundabouts.

The business, known as Orton & Spooner, was officially amalgamated in 1925, when the company George Orton, Sons and Spooner Ltd was formed. Charles Spooner died in 1939. During the Second World War the company was involved in the manufacture of military vehicles. After the war, fairground business became unpredictable, so the company also undertook general light engineering work. Manufacture of fairground equipment ended in 1954. In 1977 the business went into receivership and closed.
