= Playing House =

Playing house may refer to:

- House (game), also known as "playing house", a game played by children
- Playing House (2006 film), a film based on the novel by Patricia Pearson
- Playing House (2011 film), a 2011 film by Tom Vaughan
- Playing House (TV series), a comedy series that premiered in 2014 on USA Network
- Playing House, a book of fiction by Patricia Pearson
