= Eastown Theatre =

- Interactive map of Eastown Theatre
- Address: 8041 Harper Avenue; Detroit, Michigan; United States
- Coordinates: 42°23′17.598″N 83°1′15.772″W
- Capacity: 2,500

Construction
- Opened: October 1, 1931; 94 years ago
- Closed: 1967 (as a movie theater); 2004
- Reopened: May 29, 1969; 57 years ago
- Demolished: November 2015

Eastown Theatre was a 2,500-seat theater located at 8041 Harper on the east side of Detroit, Michigan. Opening in 1931, it operated as a movie theater until being converted into a rock music venue in 1967. Performers included Alice Cooper, Emerson, Lake and Palmer, Faces, Fleetwood Mac, Grateful Dead, twice in 1971 with the New Riders of the Purple Sage, Steppenwolf, Cream, Pink Floyd, the Amboy Dukes and Yes.

Alice Cooper said in 1997 that the Eastown was "the best audience in the world. And I'm not saying that just because you're writing it down. Any other city, people went home from work to put on their Levis and black leather jackets for a concert. In Detroit they came from work like that. The Eastown — those were pure rock 'n' roll times."

The building later became home to an adult movie theatre, Detroit Center for the Performing Arts, and then a church before being abandoned in 2004. In the late 1990s the building became a site for raves, before being taken over by a church group. The theater was put up for sale in 2004, reduced in price in 2009, and later abandoned. A fire in 2010 destroyed most of the building, and an emergency demolition order was put on the building in 2015. It was eventually demolished in November 2015.
