= The Warehouse (New Orleans) =

Rock music venue in New Orleans during the 1970s

Coordinates: 29°55′36″N 90°4′4″W

The Warehouse, located at 1820 Tchoupitoulas Street, was the main venue for rock music in New Orleans in the 1970s. Concert posters from the early 1970s printed the name as "a warehouse". It was founded by the partners in Beaver Productions. The venue had an estimated capacity of 3,500. It opened with a triple bill of The Flock, Fleetwood Mac and the headlining Grateful Dead on January 30, 1970. The members of the Grateful Dead were arrested on the venue's opening weekend for drug possession when police raided their hotel rooms. The incident was immortalized in the band's song "Truckin'," with the lines "busted down on Bourbon Street, set up like a bowling pin." On February 1, there was a "Bread for the Dead" concert to raise money for legal fees. The Flock could not stay but Fleetwood Mac and the Grateful Dead performed, and concluded with an almost 40-minute jam together on "Turn on Your Lovelight".

The Allman Brothers Band played many celebrated shows at the venue.

Jim Morrison's last concert with The Doors was at The Warehouse on December 12, 1970. The concert included the second and final performance of "Riders on the Storm". An early iteration of Kansas (now known to fans as "Kansas I") opened the show and sat in with The Doors. ZZ Top's live recording of "Jailhouse Rock" at The Warehouse was included on Fandango! (1975).

On June 4, 1982 The Clash did a set. Opening was New Orleans musician Lee Dorsey.

Talking Heads performed the last show at the venue on September 10, 1982.

The Warehouse was ultimately demolished in April 1989.
