= Green's Playhouse =

Entertainment complex in Glasgow, Scotland

Coordinates: 55.863°N 4.256°W

- The Apollo
- Interactive map of Green's Playhouse
- Address: 126 Renfield Street; Glasgow; Scotland
- Owner: George Green Ltd
- Designation: Cinema; Ballroom
- Current use: Demolished

Construction
- Opened: 15 September 1927
- Closed: 30 June 1973
- Years active: 46 Years
- Architect: John Fairweather

Green's Playhouse was an entertainment complex comprising a cinema, ballroom, tea rooms and other facilities. The Playhouse was at 126 Renfield Street, Glasgow, Scotland, commissioned by George Green Ltd, designed by the architect John Fairweather, and built by the Cinema Building Company. Opened in 1927, the Playhouse operated until the 1970s, a decline in audience numbers in the 1960s necessitated diversification as a music venue until closure in 1973. The building continued in use as the Apollo, after being acquired by Unicorn Leisure on a lease-holding arrangement, until final closure in 1985, with subsequent demolition in 1987.

== The Green family ==
George Green, an apprentice watch-maker, the son of a cabinet-maker, came into ownership of a fairground carousel; from that solitary carousel he developed a number of travelling fairground shows. It is widely believed that along with Randall Williams, he was one of the original pioneers of the cinematograph on the fairgrounds in the UK. He had travelled to London in 1896 and purchased a theatrograph from Robert W. Paul, making its first appearance on the fairgrounds in 1898. Although Green travelled with several large shows, the most extravagant was the Theatre Unique, purchased in 1911 from George 'President' Kemp, who had previously purchased it from Orton & Spooner in 1908. The Theatre Unique was centred on a 104-key Marenghi fairground organ, housed in a truck chassis which opened out to form a 50-foot (15 m) stage, complete with two carved gilded staircases flanked by four tall columns. The Theatre Unique was travelled throughout the fairgrounds during 1911 to 1914.

In 1914, Green established as an adjunct to the cinema business, Green's Film Service, a rental operation enabling cost-effectiveness in purchasing film reels outright for showing in the cinema chain and renting to other showmen / cinema operators. Green died in 1915, his sons, Fred (d. 1965) and Bert (d. 1982), with their mother and four sisters continued to expand the business. Offices in Glasgow and London were engaged in the renting of comedies, dramas and serials, with departments selling cinema projectors and printing publicity material including their own Green's Kinema Tatler magazine. An investment in Samson Films and the purchase of a rival's producing facilities gave the Green's the ability to produce their own films such as the Patriotic Porker (1916), for the War Office under the name of Green's Topical Productions. Their activities were developed further with a Scottish newsreel, The Scottish Moving Picture News, with a change of name in 1919 to British Moving Picture News, reverting in 1921 to the original name.

In the early 1920s, the Green's recognised the need to secure the best and latest films for their customers, a city-centre venue was required, they proceeded to purchase properties within the city block bounded by Renfrew Street, West Nile Street, Renfield Street and Renfrew Lane with the intention to construct the Green's Playhouse. The construction of which was to be a massive undertaking for a small family firm.

== Green's Playhouse ==
=== Design and construction ===
Following a series of newspaper advertisements highlighting the comfort and strength of the building, Green's Playhouse, was opened on 15 September 1927 by George Green Ltd. The building was the culmination of four years' work by the Green family, originally travelling fairground showmen from Preston who had moved their business to Vinegar Hill, Gallowgate, Glasgow in the late 19th century. The architect, John Fairweather, specialised in cinema design and had previously designed Green's Picturedromes in Tollcross and Rutherglen. He toured America in 1922 to study cinema design, and submitted plans in 1925 which were approved. Construction commenced on a venue that would have a cinema, ballroom, tea rooms and other auxiliary facilities.

Fairweather was to design three other Green's Playhouses, Ayr (1931), Dundee (1936), and Wishaw (1940). All four buildings displayed elaborate Corinthian columned interiors with the family slogan It's Good – It's Green's woven into the custom-made carpets laid throughout the buildings. Other notable cinemas by Fairweather include the Savoy in Cambuslang (1929), the Ritz Cinema, Burton-on-Trent (1935), the Ritz Cinema, Wigan (1938), and the Playhouse in Edinburgh (1927), designed as a super cinema and now used as a theatre. It is also suggested that Fairweather was involved in the interior designs of both the Odeon, Chingford (1935) and the Essoldo Brighton (1940). The exterior structure for Chingford was designed by Andrew Mather, whilst Brighton was by Samuel Beverley. The interiors of both these buildings do not appear to have any features in common with Fairweather's style, however, and there is no mention of his contribution in the extensively researched published histories of either circuit, so his involvement is not certain.

=== The cinema ===
The cinema premiered the feature-length action thriller, Play Safe, starring Monty Banks. With a seating capacity in excess of 4,000, the cinema laid claim to be the largest in the United Kingdom and Europe. Designed primarily as a cinema to screen films, the screen could be retracted upwards to reveal a small stage some 12-foot (3.7 m) high from floor-level. The projection box was located in the centre underside of the lower balcony. The decor was luxurious for its time, and the installation of the Golden Divans seating on the lower balcony, was popular with courting couples, providing the cinema with a uniqueness that was exploited in newspaper advertisements of the day. An additional upper balcony was nicknamed The Gods. An orchestra and dancing girls added to the spectacle in the early days.

=== The ballroom ===
The ballroom was constructed to the exacting standards as befitted the expectations of ballroom dancing at that time with a sprung floor designed to absorb the impact of the dancers. In its hey-day, the ballroom played host to leading dance bands of the era including; Ken Mackintosh, Joe Loss, Duke Ellington, the Oscar Rabin Band and Ronnie Scott's Big Band. The musical career of George Chisholm, Scottish jazz trombonist, began in the Playhouse Orchestra. Perched above the cinema auditorium, access to the ballroom necessitated the installation of a lift, which was often unreliable forcing patrons to use the stairs, of which there were many.

=== Concert venue ===
As a result of the general decline in ballroom dancing and the emergence of the multi-national cinema companies, the Playhouse found it increasingly difficult to obtain first-run films and consequently struggled to fill its vast spaces with paying customers. The area was already in decline – the neighbouring Royalty Theatre was destroyed by fire in 1953, and subsequently replaced by the St. Andrew's House office tower in the early 1960s, further diminishing the area's status as Glasgow's entertainment district.

By the mid-1960s maintenance costs was outstripping revenue considerably and all means of diversification were considered. The late 1960s and early 1970s saw a reprieve of sorts, with many of the top Pop and Rock bands of the day hiring the cinema auditorium as a concert venue. The ballroom was leased to Unicorn Leisure which operated a club named Clouds, and provided a guaranteed source of revenue for the Green family. The building continued to deteriorate to the extent the cinema auditorium finally closed on 30 June 1973. Shortly after the closure, a lease was negotiated by Unicorn Leisure who reopened the cinema auditorium as a music venue, the Apollo, in September 1973. The Apollo, was to become the leading concert venue in Glasgow until it finally closed in June 1985. The building was demolished in September 1987 following a fire that rendered the building structurally unsafe. It is now the site of the Cineworld Glasgow multiplex.

== Performers ==
Artistes who performed at Green's Playhouse, 1967–1973

- Alice Cooper
- Barclay James Harvest
- Beggars Opera
- Black Sabbath
- Captain Beefheart and his Magic Band
- Chuck Berry
- David Bowie
- Deep Purple
- Donovan
- Elton John
- Emerson, Lake & Palmer
- Family
- Fleetwood Mac
- Free
- Genesis
- Hawkwind
- Humble Pie
- Jethro Tull
- Jimi Hendrix
- John Mayall
- King Crimson
- Led Zeppelin
- Lindisfarne
- Mott the Hoople
- Paul McCartney & Wings
- Pink Floyd
- Rory Gallagher
- Roxy Music
- Slade
- Status Quo
- Stone the Crows
- Ten Years After
- The Faces
- The Groundhogs
- The Rolling Stones
- The Who
- Uriah Heep
- Van der Graaf Generator
- West, Bruce and Laing
- Wishbone Ash
- Yes
