= Geoff Heslop =

English record producer and musician (born 1947)

- Born: 3 June 1947 (age 78); Corbridge, Northumberland, England
- Occupation(s): Record producer, musician, songwriter
- Instrument: Guitar
- Years active: 1960s–present
- Labels: Rubber Records, Black Crow Records, Shipbuilders, Shipyard

Geoff Heslop (born 3 June 1947 in Northumberland, England) is an English record producer and musician.

== Career ==
After studying Fine Art and Design at Newcastle College of Art and Design, he trained as a recording engineer in Impulse Studios, Wallsend. He then turned to record production, producing albums for the Rubber Records label in Newcastle upon Tyne. He went on to set up the Black Crow Records label, the Coquetdale Music Publishing company (with Kathryn Tickell) and Redesdale Studios (with singer Dick Gaughan).

In the 1990s, he put together a second publishing company with his songwriter wife Brenda Heslop, Ribbon Road Music, and issued 14 albums. He ran Shipyard Studios and produced music by himself and others on the Shipyard label. He now produces albums of music by himself and his wife Brenda under the name Frank and Rose

== Records produced by Geoff Heslop ==
=== 1970s ===
1972

- Don't Panic (Pete Scott)
- His Round (Tony Capstick and Hedgehog Pie)

1973

- Very Good Time (Derek Brimstone)

1974

- Life of a Man (The Buskers)
- Punch and Judy Man (Tony Capstick)
- There Was This Bloke (Mike Harding, Tony Capstick, Bill Barclay and Derek Brimstone)

1975

- Mrs 'Ardin's Kid (Mike Harding)

1976

- Songs and Buttered Haycocks (Dave Burland)
- The Rochdale Cowboy Rides Again (Mike Harding)
- Shuffleboat River Farewell (Derek Brimstone)
- Broken-down Gentlemen (John Leonard and John Squire)
- 5 Hand Reel (Five Hand Reel)
- Jimmy the Moonlight (Pete Scott)

1977

- Alba (Alba)
- Mike Harding's Back (Mike Harding)
- Tony Capstick Does a Turn (Tony Capstick)
- Out of the Brown (Mike Elliott)

1978

- Just Act Normal (Hedgehog Pie)
- The Traveller (Allan Taylor
- Songs of Ewan MacColl (Dick Gaughan, Dave Burland and Tony Capstick)
- Nowt So Good'll Pass (Bob Fox and Stu Luckley)
- On Two Levels (Sean McGuire and Josephine Keegan)

1979

- Kingdom (Dando Shaft)
- You Can't Fool the Fat Man (Dave Burland)
- Up the Town (The Buskers, Sean McGuire and Winter's Armoury)

=== 1980s ===
1980

- Roll on the Day (Allan Taylor)
- Port of Call (Tom McConville and Kieran Halpin)

1981

- The Champion String Band (The Champion String Band)

1982

- At Last It's (Mike Elliott)
- The Streets of Everywhere (Tom McConville and Kieran Halpin)
- Wish We Never Had Parted (Bob Fox and Stu Luckley)
- Joe Hutton of Coquetdale (Joe Hutton)

1983

- Double Trouble (Maxie and Mitch)
- Circle Round Again (Allan Taylor)
- Harthope Burn (Joe Hutton, Will Atkinson and Willy Taylor)
- On the Other Side (Alan Hull) (with Mickey Sweeney)

1984

- Under the Rain (Rab Noakes)

1985

- Shake Loose the Border (Chuck Fleming and Gerry Kaley)

1986

- Borderlands (Kathryn Tickell)
- From Sewingshields to Glendale (Kathryn Tickell, Alistair Anderson, Joe Hutton, Willy Taylor, Will Atkinson, Mike Tickell, Allan Wood, The John Dagg Band)

1987

- The Grand Chain (Alistair Anderson)
- Mouthorgan (Will Atkinson) (with Alistair Anderson)

1988

- Leather Launderette (Bert Jansch and Rod Clements)
- Another Little Adventure (Alan Hull)
- Common Ground (Kathryn Tickell)

=== 1990s ===
1990

- Hootz! (Simon Thoumire and Ian Carr)

1991

- Syncopace (Syncopace)
- The Kathryn Tickell Band (The Kathryn Tickell Band)
- Warksburn (Mike Tickell) (with Kathryn Tickell)
- Blue Skies, Dark Nights (Roly Johnson)
- The Border Piper (Joe and Hannah Hutton)
- Jane of Biddlestone (Adrian D. Schofield)
- Frisco Bound (Ray Stubbs)
- Put Your Money Where Your Mouth Is (Ray Stubbs R and B All Stars)

1992

- Signs (The Kathryn Tickell Band)
- Welcome to the Dene (Willy Taylor)
- A Difficult Fish (Johnny Handle)

1993

- The Music of My Heart (Ribbon Road)
- Waltzes for Playboys (Simon Thoumire Three)
- The Mortgaged Heart (Ribbon Road)

1994

- Opus Blue (Catriona MacDonald and Ian Lowthian)
- The Moving Cloud (Ribbon Road)

=== 2000s ===
2001

- The Tender Coming (Ribbon Road)

2008

- Golden Bells (Brenda Heslop and Ribbon Road)

2009

- As the Stories Burn (Martin Heslop)
- "Speaking Out" (Mission Shift)
- It's a Silk Cut World (Mission Shift)

2010

- It Couldn't Last (Ribbon Road)

2012

- Roadside Dreams (Ribbon Road)

2014

- No Redemption Songs (Ribbon Road)

2016

- Our Streets Are Numbered (Ribbon Road)

2018

- Paper Dolls (Ribbon Road)

2019

- Love On The Losing Side (Ribbon Road)

2024

- Music For Mr Singer (Frank and Rose)

2025

- Blue Yonder (Ribbon Road)
- The Triple Fool (Ribbon Road)
- being Frank (Frank and Rose)
