= Transform Me Then Into a Fish =

Studio album by Martin Carthy
- Released: 5 August 2025
- Recorded: 2024
- Genre: Folk
- Length: 49:02
- Label: HemHem Records
- Producers: Ben Seal; Eliza Carthy

Martin Carthy chronology
The Moral of the Elephant (2014)	Transform Me Then Into a Fish (2025)

Transform Me Then Into a Fish is the nineteenth studio album by English folk music singer Martin Carthy. Produced by Ben Seal and Carthy's daughter Eliza, it was released on 7 August 2025 via HemHem Records, and is Carthy's first album in eleven years, following 2014's The Moral of the Elephant. Intended as a bookend to his 1965 self-titled debut album, the project featured both new recordings and arrangements of some those tracks that have been reimagined with the wisdom and experience of Carthy's six decades in music. The album's title comes from the song "Ye Mariners All" collected from Dorset singer Marina Russell, nee Sartin, by Henry E D Hammond in the early 1900's.

The album received a positive receptions from critics and was nominated for the 2025 Mercury Prize, making Carthy the oldest artist in history to make the shortlist, and the third member of his family (following his late wife Norma Waterson and their daughter Eliza Carthy) to be nominated for the Prize.

== Background ==
Carthy announced the album on 24 March 2025 to commemorate both his 84th birthday and his music career overall, aiming to revisit and re-record some of the songs from his debut album, which was released in 1965 on Fontana Records when he was 24 years old and was subsequently reissued in 2024 by Topic Records. The album cover, featuring Carthy sitting alone at a breakfast table in the sea, is a reference to a famous photograph taken of Carthy and his late wife Norma Waterson eating breakfast together. The project features instrumental contributions from Eliza Carthy and Sheema Mukherjee, who each appear on three tracks.

In an interview with The Guardian, Carthy explained that the project originally started out as a 60th anniversary tribute to his debut album but, as the album developed, three songs were dropped and were replaced by new ones. His re-interpretation of "Scarborough Fair" is based on a version by Cecil Sharp that he heard for the first time when he was asked to perform the song in an episode of the 2014 supernatural horror series Remember Me. He first began working with sitarist Sheema Mukherjee while participating in The Imagined Village project.

== Track listing ==
The references after the titles below are from the three major numbering schemes for traditional folk songs, the Roud Folk Song Index, Child Ballad Numbers and the Laws Numbers.
All tracks Traditional except where noted, all tracks arranged by Martin Carthy

No.	Title	Writer(s)	Length
1.	"The Trees They Do Grow High" (Roud 31; Laws O35)		4:35
2.	"Ye Mariners All" (Roud 1191)		3:16
3.	"Lovely Joan" (Roud 592)		3:04
4.	"Dream Of Napoleon" (Roud 1538)		5:43
5.	"Eighteenth of June" (Roud 2539)		6:17
6.	"The Handsome Cabin Boy" (Roud 239; Laws N13)		3:00
7.	"A-Begging I Will Go" (Roud 286)		3:51
8.	"High Germany" (Roud 904)	Cecil Sharp	3:51
9.	"The Famous Flower of Serving-Men" (Roud 199; Child 106)		7:13
10.	"Scarborough Fair" (Roud 12; Child 2)		4:09
11.	"Springhill Mine Disaster"	Ewan MacColl; Peggy Seeger	3:58

== Personnel ==
- Eliza Carthy - fiddle, production (tracks 2, 6, and 11)
- Martin Carthy - vocals, guitar
- Sheema Mukherjee - sitar (tracks 4, 5, and 10)
- Ben Seal - production, mixing, engineering
