= Gerbino =

Surname list

Gerbino is a surname. Notable people with the surname include:

- Jeff Gerbino (born 1953), American stand-up comedian;
- Lian Gerbino (born 1983), Argentine musician;
- Luca Gerbino Polo (born 1987), Italian footballer;
- Mario Gerbino (1937 - 2020), Italian civil servant, specialized in international trade. Author of several chapters of the Italian Law Encyclopedia.
