= David Haslam =

David Haslam may refer to:

- Sir David Haslam (Royal Navy officer) (1923–2009)
- David Haslam (physician) (born 1949), Chair of the National Institute for Health and Care Excellence
- David Haslam (GP), Chairman of the National Obesity Forum
- David Haslam (conductor), conductor of the English Philharmonic Orchestra
- Dave Haslam, writer, broadcaster and DJ
