= On the Other Side (Alan Hull album) =

1983 album by Alan Hull

Studio album by Alan Hull
- Released: 1983
- Studio: Lynx Studios
- Genre: Folk rock, rock
- Label: Black Crow Records
- Producer: Mickey Sweeney; Alan Hull; Geoff Heslop (executive)

Alan Hull chronology
Phantoms (1979)	On the Other Side (1983)	Another Little Adventure (1988)

Squire
Review scores
Source	Rating
AllMusic	3.5/5 stars

On the Other Side is a 1983 studio album recording by Alan Hull. The album was released as a vinyl LP and cassette tape. Alan Hull was a socialist and he spent more time being involved politically during the period that this record was produced, resulting in a reduction of musical output.

== Track listing ==
All tracks composed by Alan Hull.

Side A

1. On The Other Side (5:24)
2. Evergreen (4:09)
3. Inside A Broken Heart (3:39)
4. Malvinas Melody (6:12)

Side B

1. American Man (4:00)
2. A Mystery Play (3:15)
3. Day Of The Jackal (2:57)
4. Love In A Cage (4:30)
5. Fly Away (3:15)

== Personnel ==
- Alan Hull – vocals, keyboards, guitar, piano
- Pete Kirtley – guitar
- Frank Gibbon – bass
- Paul Smith – drums, percussion
- David Haslam – strings (string arrangement)
- The Northern Sinfonia Musicians – performer (Side B, track 2)
