= Ian Fairbairn (musician) =

British musician

Ian "Walter" Fairbairn (born 28 August 1953) is an English folk musician, who was raised in the North East of England. He developed his musical talent whilst still at school, inspired by his contemporaries Dave Richardson (The Boys of the Lough) and the concertina player Alistair Anderson. Fairbairn was soon singing and playing in local groups such as Trimrigg, before joining Hedgehog Pie, and then the Lindisfarne spin-off band Jack the Lad.

He has toured extensively in the UK and Europe, playing with a wide variety of bands and musicians. His musical career has included performances at Cambridge, Edinburgh and Reading Festivals, as well as appearances on the Old Grey Whistle Test, BBC Radio 1 In Concert and Folk on Two.

Fairbairn joined Aiken's Drum in the late 1980s as a stand-in, and has been the longest-serving member. He continues to play with other bands and has appeared on many recordings, mainly in the folk arena. Fairbairn has been a long term provider of fiddle parts for various Guy Manning albums, and has also appeared as part of the latter's live line-up. He has most recently been playing with The Mighty Doonans, a spin-off of the highly successful Doonan Family Band.

== Biography ==
Fairbairn learned to play guitar by utilising his brother's instrument. At Wallsend Grammar School, he joined the school's Folk Song Society, which included Dave Richardson (later of The Boys of the Lough) and Alistair Anderson. Fairbairn's first public performance was playing a 5 string banjo alongside Dave Richardson's younger brother, Tich, at a church fete in Howdon-on-Tyne.

With fellow schoolfriend Stu Luckley they formed a duo called Trimrigg, and played folk music around Tynemouth, Cullercoats and Whitley Bay. In time the line-up expanded to include Luckley's girlfriend Margi. In 1971, Hedgehog Pie decided to replace the departing mandolin player, Andy Seagrove, by absorbing Trimrigg into their ranks. Fairbairn remained with Hedgehog Pie for two years, performing on BBC Radio (Folk on 2), at the Edinburgh Festival with Silly Wizard, and his first appearance at the Cambridge Folk Festival. Hedgehog Pie were the result of the flourishing folk revival in northern England and the attempts to extend the British folk rock movement in the region. They failed to achieve mainstream recognition, but retain a local and cult following in the context of northern folk music.

By 1973 Fairbairn, along with Phil Murray joined Jack the Lad, who recorded three albums and toured extensively before Lindisfarne reformed. The last Jack the Lad concert took place in Redcar in July 1977, although several reunions culminated in an appearance at the Skagen Festival in Denmark in 1993. In 1978 Fairbairn joined the award winning country band, Midnight Flyer, and has played with them on and off over the years.

Fairbairn played with various other bands before being recruited by Aiken's Drum. Since the 1980s Fairbairn has performed alongside or with Paul Buckley, Chris Newman, Nick Strutt, Roger Knowles, Michael Chapman, Tony Wilson, Brian Golbey, Alistair Russell, Gordon Tyrall, Hot Pot Belly Band, Witches Bane, Four Horseman, Ray Band, Boxcar Willie, Sons of the Freemen, Scarlet Heights and Aiken's Drum.

Fairbairn has recorded with Tony Capstick, The Buskers, Mike Harding, Guy Manning, Tom Robinson, Tony Wilson, Ewan Carruthers, Paul Buckley, Gordon Tyrall, Alan Taylor, Scarlet Heights, Aiken's Drum and the Mighty Doonans.
