= To the Orphic Void =

Studio album by Tersivel
- Released: 11 February 2022
- Recorded: 2021
- Studio: White Door Mixing
- Genre: Progressive metal, post-metal, pagan metal
- Length: 42:54
- Label: Uprising! Records

Tersivel chronology
Worship Of The Gods	To the Orphic Void

To the Orphic Void is the third studio album by the Argentine/Swedish band Tersivel. The album was released on 11 February through Uprising! Records.

== Concept ==
The album deals with the concept of death and how this can be philosophically approached from different angles. The lyrics refer to Orphism as well as Pythagorean metempsychosis but only as metaphors or allegories to explore the concept. On the booklet's second page the following text is included:

Inhabiting this record could be both a cathartic and dramatic experience. There are no shortcuts in life, and yet, there's one clear destination to us all. Shared by everyone. Common to each little living thing that dances to the music of Nature. Death, and the mystery of its power over us, embodies our way of living, our way of passing through this Time tunnel. It also embodies how we deal with sorrow, depression, addiction, loneliness and anxiety, to maybe, as Rilke beautifully put it, to find in art a way to transform the emptiness, the radical deficiency, of human longing into something else. Orpheus, our poet hero, is no more than a mere metaphor. The mythical landscapes of the underworld, the stage. The tears of Hades, the ink. The boat of Charon, a ship for our limitations.

== Promotion ==
To promote the album, on 26 November 2021, Tersivel released the song "Weeping Iron Tears". A few weeks later, on 7 January 2022, the band released the song "The Ferryman".

== Reception ==
The album was generally well-received critically. Gardenstale of Angry Metal Guy explained in the review, "The emotional depth is stronger, the songwriting more varied. Tersivel has a freshness, a willingness to experiment". Andy Spoon of Metal Epidemic, gave the album a total score of 4.5 out of 5; "Tersivel has found a vibe which is both invigorating and entertaining through its curtain of noise and harmony. Managing to be both sticky and smooth at the same time". Musclassia of Metal Storm, gave the album a total score of 7.8 out of 10; "To The Orphic Void finds that sweet spot between making your influences clear while still producing a result that sounds fresh and exciting, and backs it up with memorable songs".

== Track listing ==
All tracks written by Lian Gerbino, Franco Robert and Danny Ebenholtz. All lyrics written by Lian Gerbino.

To the Orphic Void track listing
No.	Title	Length
1.	"She"	7:42
2.	"Weeping Iron Tears"	6:44
3.	"Moving On"	7:03
4.	"The Ferryman"	4:59
5.	"Shivering Deadly Cold"	5:46
6.	"Transmigration of the Soul"	10:38

== Personnel ==
'Band members

- Lian Gerbino – vocals, electric guitar, acoustic guitar, bass, noise, sound design
- Franco Robert – keyboard, piano, backing vocals
- Danny Ebenholtz – drum, percussion, backing vocals

Additional personnel

- Vito Rodriguez Christensen – Artwork cover, logo
- Lian Gerbino - Recording, Mixing, Mastering, Graphic Design, Layout.
