= High Germany (folk song) =

British traditional folk song

High Germany (Roud 904), is a traditional folk song, once known throughout England, Ireland and Scotland, with a history spanning hundreds of years. There are three songs known as High Germany. This page focuses on the best known one, the others being The Two Lovers or True Lovers (Roud 1445) and The Wars of Germany (Roud 5608).

The song deals with a young man (usually named Willy) and his lover (Polly) lamenting over his conscription to fight in Germany, "High Germany" referring to the southern, mountainous part of the country. He attempts to convince her to join him in the war. "Polly" professes her love, but declares she is not fit for war. "Willy" attempts to persuade her to change her mind, stating that he will buy her a horse to ride, and that they will eventually wed. "Polly" still refuses and laments that her man has been drafted away from her. The historical setting of the ballad is most likely either the War of the Spanish Succession (1701–1714 with the 1704 Battle of Blenheim in Southern Germany) or the Seven Years War (1756–1763).

The first verse is usually as follows:

Oh Polly love, oh Polly, the rout has now begun.
We must go a-marching to the beating of the drum.
Dress yourself all in your best and come along with me.
I'll take you to the war, my love, in High Germany.

Cecil Sharp collected a version in 1906, and successfully encouraged Gustav Holst to use the melody in A Somerset Rhapsody (1907). Ralph Vaughan Williams later used the melody in the third movement of his famous English Folk Song Suite (1923).

== Field recordings ==
Countless versions of the ballad have been found, including numerous recordings, several of which are available online. The following examples are some which use variations of the famous tune.

- 1908: Archer Lane of Winchcombe, Gloucestershire, recorded on phonograph by Percy Grainger
- 1956: Phoebe Smith of Melton, Woodbridge, Suffolk, recorded by Peter Kennedy
- 1968: Ethel Findlater of Dounby, Orkney, recorded by Alan J. Bruford

== Popular recordings ==
- 1965: Martin Carthy performed a version of the song on his first album, Martin Carthy
- 1969: The Dubliners performed the song on their album, At Home with The Dubliners, with Luke Kelly on lead vocals
- 1972: Pentangle sang their version on Solomon's Seal
- 2009: the band strawbs included a version of the song in their album "a taste of strawbs"
- 2011: Tersivel performed a metal version of the song on their album For One Pagan Brotherhood
- 2011: The Dreadnoughts included the lyrics and melody of the song in their medley, "The Cruel Wars"
- 2017: Tell Tale Tusk performed and recorded at Sofar London as, "High Germany"
- 2021: The Longest Johns recorded their version as, "The Cruel Wars"
