= Ian Fairbairn =

Ian Fairbairn may refer to:

- Ian Fairbairn (rower), British financier and Olympic rower
- Ian Fairbairn (actor), English actor
- Ian Fairbairn (musician), English folk musician
