= Whippersnapper =

Whippersnapper or whipper snapper is a young, impertinent and irritatingly overconfident person. It may also refer to:

- Whippersnapper (band), an English folk group
- "Whipper Snapper", a song by LaVern Baker
- Whipper-snapper, another name for Stunner (professional wrestling), a wrestling move
- The Whippersnapper, the 1970s advertising mascot for Kellogg's Corn Pops
