= Swarb's Lazarus =

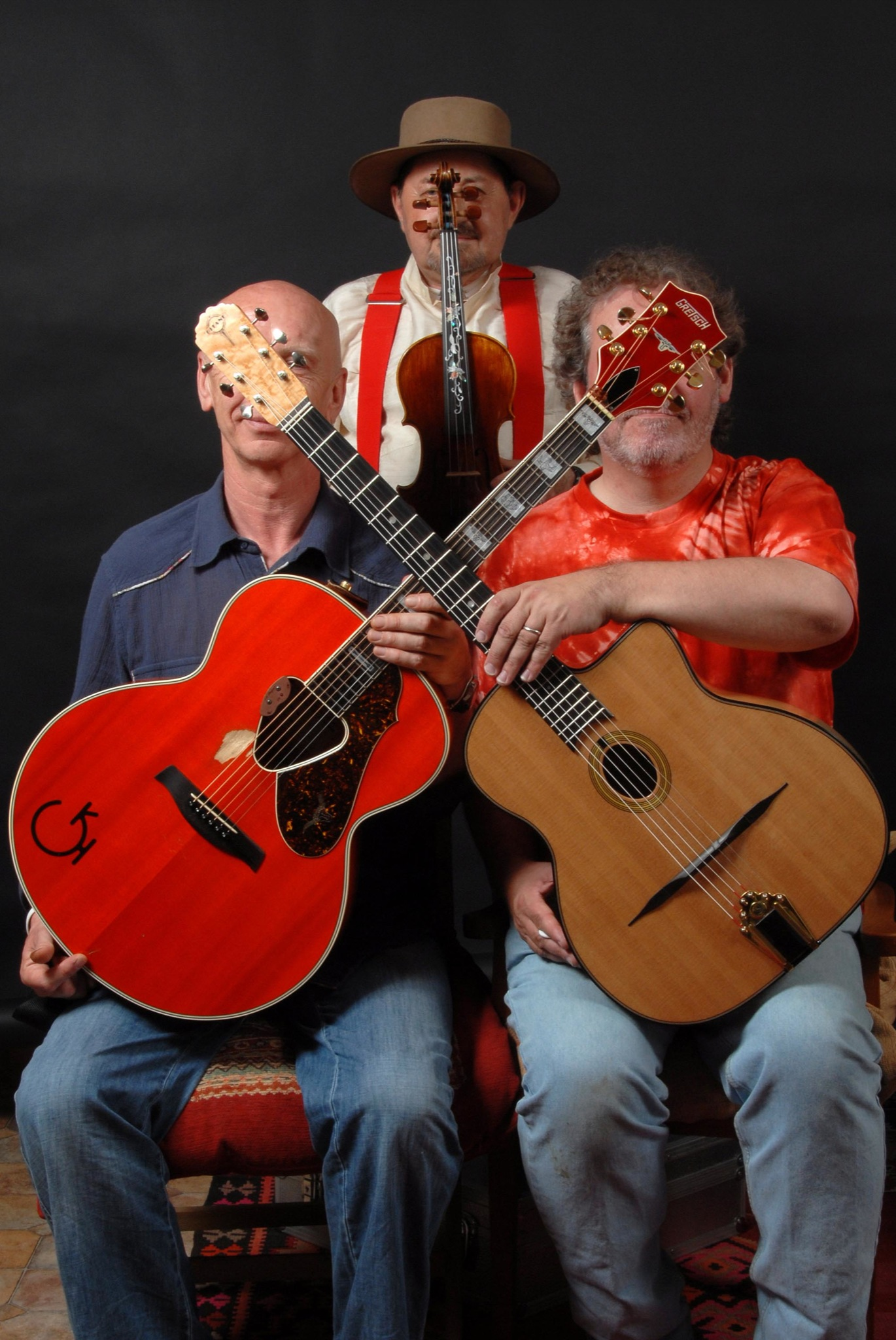

Background information
- Origin: United Kingdom
- Genres: English folk music
- Years active: 2006–2009
- Label: Squiggle
- Past members: Maartin Allcock; Kevin Dempsey; Dave Swarbrick
- Website: www.swarbslazarus.com

Swarb's Lazarus, or just Lazarus were an English folk band formed by Dave Swarbrick ("Swarb") (fiddle, mandolin, vocals) with ex-Whippersnapper Kevin Dempsey (guitar, vocals) and ex-Fairport Maartin Allcock (multi-instrumentalist, vocals). They have released one album – Live and Kicking (2006), a compilation of live recordings made in April and May 2006, which has received critical approval.

The instrumental track The Brilliancy Medley And The Cherokee Shuffle was included on the Folk Awards 2007 Box Set

The band's name is an ironic reference to Swarbrick having his obituary published some years before.
