= Phantoms (Alan Hull album) =

1983 album by Alan Hull

Studio album by Alan Hull
- Released: 1979
- Studio: Lynx Studios
- Genre: Folk rock, rock
- Label: The Rocket Record Company
- Producer: Alan Hull, Peter Kelsey

Alan Hull chronology
Squire (1975)	Phantoms (1979)	On the Other Side (1983)

Squire
Review scores
Source	Rating
AllMusic	4.5/5 stars

Phantoms is a 1979 studio album recording by Alan Hull. The album was engineered by Peter Kelsey and released as a vinyl LP.

The album cover is based on the painting Le musée du roi by the surrealist artist Magritte and is supplemented by material from the 1977 album Isn't it Strange by Radiator, a group formed with the help of the Lindisfarne drummer Ray Laidlaw. A CD reissue version included five bonus demo tracks from 1975.

== Track listing ==
All tracks composed by Alan Hull.

Side A

1. I Wish You Well
2. Madmen And Loonies
3. Make Me Want To Stay
4. Dancin' (On The Judgement Day)
5. A Walk In The Sea

Side B

1. Corporation Rock
2. Anywhere Is Everywhere
3. Somewhere Out There
4. Love Is The Alibi
5. Love Is The Answer

== Personnel ==
- Alan Hull – vocals, acoustic guitar, electric piano
- Kenny Craddock – keyboards, acoustic guitar, backing vocals, ARP synthesizer, Melodica
- Colin Gibson – bass, percussion
- Peter Kirtley – electric guitar, acoustic guitar
- Ray Laidlaw – drums, percussion
- Jo Newman, Lesley Duncan, Liza Strike, Rab Noakes – backing vocals
- Buddy Beadle, Steve Gregory – horns
- John Ashcroft – string arrangement
