= Kevin Dempsey =

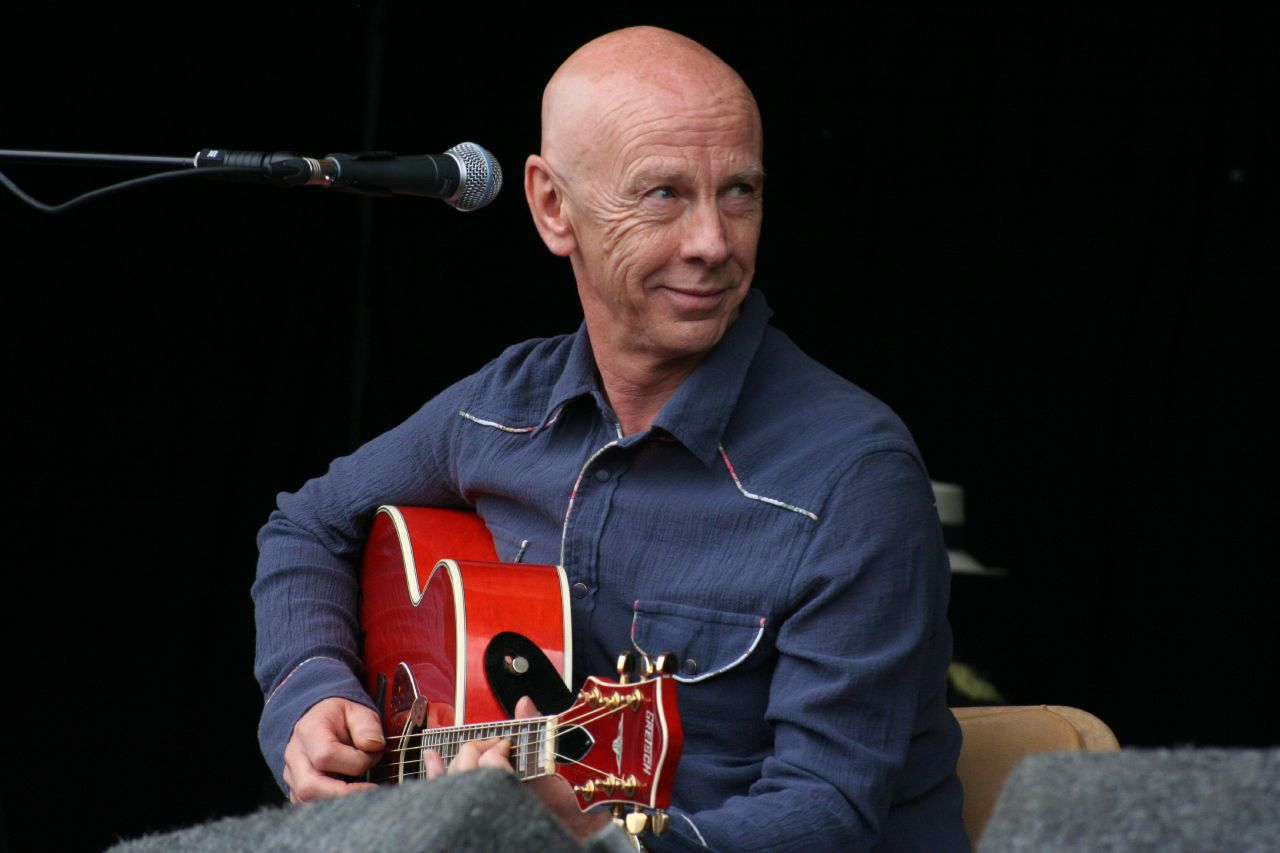

Background information
- Born: May 29, 1950 (age 76); Coventry, West Midlands, England
- Genre: Folk
- Years active: c. 1960s–present
- Label: various
- Website: kevindempsey.net

Kevin Dempsey is a British guitarist, songwriter, producer and arranger, whose playing has been described as "innovative".

== Career ==
Dempsey started off playing drums before moving quickly to guitar.

A co-founder of progressive folk act Dando Shaft, when the band broke up in 1972, Dempsey spent time in India before heading to the US, where he joined Blue Aquarius, a jazz/ funk outfit signed to Stax Records. He also played Latin music with Los Bohemios, and did session work with Alice Coltrane.

Upon returning to the UK, Dempsey went on to perform with a variety of acts including, notably, Swarb's Lazarus and Whippersnapper (band) with Dave Swarbrick, and Uiscedwr (2005-2007).

He also worked with Denim (band), accordion player Karen Tweed, Cincinnati-based Rosie Carson and Peter Knight (folk musician).

Other artists Kevin has played with include Percy Sledge, The Marvellettes, Mary Black (accompanying her on a 2004 US tour) and from 2018, Jacqui McShee.

In 2020, McShee and Dempsey released From There To Here via their own McDem Records which gave "them both a chance to explore and record more traditional folk songs and share writing ventures."

Well travelled, Dempsey has performed across the UK, Europe, Ireland, US and in 2013, made his first appearance in Australia, appearing at Folkworld Fairbridge Festival.

Kevin has released one solo album, 1987's The Cry Of Love.

== Dempsey Broughton ==
In 1999, Dempsey teamed with fiddle player Joe Broughton (The Urban Folk Quartet, The Albion Band) as Dempsey Broughton. The duo have released several albums, beginning with Every Other World (1999), and tour intermittently. Their most recent release is Off By Heart (2017).

Dempsey said, the duo play "instrumentals, traditional songs and original songs", while their teaming has been described as a "dynamic partnership."

In 2019, the duo marked their 20th anniversary with a series of UK dates.

== Style ==
Although Dempsey is best known for his work within the British folk tradition, "he grew up on a diet of American music; folk, blues, soul, Sonny Terry and Brownie McGee, Otis Redding, Mississippi John Hurt" and has played with musicians from US, El Salvador and Guatemala. His wide experience "shows in his versatility and ability to turn his hand, and guitar, to many different styles and genres."

Dempsey has been praised for his "sensitive finger picking" while Martin Carthy has referred to him as “a beautiful guitarist.”

== Selected discography ==
- An Evening With Dando Shaft - Dando Shaft (1970)
- Dando Shaft - Dando Shaft (1971)
- Lantaloon - Dando Shaft (1972)
- Promises - Whippersnapper (1985)
- Tsubo - Whippersnapper (1987)
- The Cry Of Love - Kevin Dempsey (1987/1988)
- Fortune - Whippersnapper (1989)
- Always With You - Chris Leslie and Kevin Dempsey (1989)
- Every Other World - Dempsey Broughton (1999)
- Mazurka Berserker - John Kirkpatrick (2001)
- Freehand - Dempsey Broughton (2004)
- Circle - Uiscedwr (2006)
- The Salty Diamond - Rosie Carson and Kevin Dempsey (2010)
- Raison D’etre - Swarbrick (2010)
- Between the Distance - Rosie Carson and Kevin Dempsey (2011)
- Nightbirds - Rosie Carson and Kevin Dempsey (2016)
- Off By Heart - Dempsey Broughton (2017)
- From There To Here - Jacqui McShee Kevin Dempsey (2020)
