= Scarborough Fair (fair) =

Medieval fair held in Yorkshire, England

During the late Middle Ages the seaside town of Scarborough, in Yorkshire, was an important venue for traders from all over England. It was host to a huge 45-day trading event starting on 15 August, and continuing until the end of September. Merchants came to it from all areas of England, Norway, Denmark, the Baltic states, the Byzantine Empire and the Ottoman Empire. Scarborough Fair originated from a royal charter granted by King Henry III of England on 22 January 1253. The charter, which gave Scarborough many privileges, stated "The Burgesses and their heirs forever may have a yearly fair in the Borough, to continue from the Feast of the Assumption of the Blessed Virgin Mary until the Feast of St Michael next following" (15 August – 29 September). Naturally, such a large occasion attracted a lot more than just tradesmen; they needed to be entertained and fed and therefore large crowds of buyers, sellers, and pleasure-seekers attended the fair. Prices were determined by supply and demand, with goods often being exchanged through the barter system. Records show that from 1383 due to another fair in neighbouring Seamer, Scarborough's prosperity slumped.

In the early 17th century, competition from other towns' markets and fairs and increasing taxation saw further collapse of the Fair until it eventually became financially untenable. The market was revived again in the 18th century, but due to intense competition, Scarborough Fair finally ended in 1788, due to the popularity of the nearby Seamer Fair.

The traditional "Scarborough Fair" no longer exists, but a number of low-key celebrations take place every September to mark the original event. Scarborough Fair in July 2006, witnessed medieval jousting competitions hosted by English Heritage in addition to the usual attractions. In 2016, a revival of the fair as a music festival headlined by Richard Ashcroft was attempted. Organizers canceled one month before the festival, citing "logistical issues".

It was announced on 3 January 2023, that the Fair would be re-established. The festival will be reimagined as a year round programme of distinctive arts, heritage, culinary, music events and sporting contests. Planning is initially for the period 2023 to 2026.

The fair features in the traditional English ballad "Scarborough Fair".
