= Redesdale Studios =

Recording studio in Northumberland, England

Coordinates: 55.23387°N 2.10240°W

Redesdale Studios was a Northumberland recording studio founded in 1996. It was situated in Elsdon in North Northumberland. It began as a partnership between Rubber and Black Crow Records manager Geoff Heslop, Scottish singer and songwriter Dick Gaughan, and the two partners in CM records, Dave Bulmer and Neil Sharpley. In the years between 1986 and 1995 it was the main studio in the county, recording many albums for its own labels, Black Crow Records, Acoustic Radio, Delta and Rede, as well for other labels.

Built and designed by Heslop and Gaughan, they had in addition the talent of engineer Mickey Sweeney to call upon, as well as musicians such as Rod Clements, Chuck Fleming, Paul Flush and Paul Smith and Dire Straits' keyboards player Alan Clark.

The studio was in the Old School and featured a large acoustic space linked by a huge window to the control room. The rooms were filled with natural light which was always a plus for musicians who preferred it to the black holes that they usually had to record in. Unfortunately, the partnership broke up, with Heslop and Gaughan leaving in 1995 over severe differences with the other two partners. The building has stood empty, unused and deteriorating since that time.

Many well-known artists recorded there during the studio's heyday. Among the clients were Kathryn Tickell (Kathryn Tickell Band, Signs, The Gathering), Ribbon Road (The Mortgaged Heart), Clan Alba, Rod Clements, Joe Hutton, Alistair Anderson, Simon Thoumire, Catriona MacDonald and many others.
