= Another Little Adventure =

1988 album by Alan Hull

Studio album by Alan Hull
- Released: 1988
- Venue: Dovecote Arts Centre, Stockton & Darlington Arts Centre, England
- Studio: Reel Time Studios, Newcastle upon Tyne, England (Side 1, Track 5)
- Genre: Folk rock, folk
- Label: Black Crow Records
- Producer: Geoff Heslop

Alan Hull chronology
On the Other Side (1983)	Another Little Adventure (1988)	Back to Basics (1994)

Another Little Adventure is a 1988 studio album recorded by Alan Hull, previously in the Newcastle upon Tyne folk rock band Lindisfarne. The tracks were recorded with Ian McCallum. The album was engineered by Mickey Sweeney, except track Side 1, Track 5, which was engineered by Steve Daggett. The album was initially released as a vinyl LP and later in 2004 as a CD.

Hull was a socialist and he spent more time being involved in politics during the 1980s, resulting in a reduction of albums compared to the 1970s.

== Track listing ==
All tracks composed by Alan Hull.

Side 1

1. Drinking Song (2:18)
2. Money Game (2:39)
3. United States Of Mind (2:52)
4. Dan The Plan (3:10)
5. Treat Me Kindly (4:50)
6. Fly Away (3:15)
7. Malvinas Melody (4:35)

Side 2

1. One More Bottle Of Wine (4:03)
2. Poor Old Ireland (3:25)
3. Evening (2:30)
4. January Song (3:20)
5. All Fall Down (2:20)
6. Marshall Reilly's Army (3:35)
7. Heroes (3:10)

== Personnel ==
- Alan Hull – vocals, guitar, piano
- Ian McCallum – harmony vocals, guitar, harmonica
- Mickey Sweeney – engineer (except Side 1, Track 5, Steve Daggett)
