= Martin Carthy (album) =

Studio album by Martin Carthy
- Released: 1965
- Genre: Folk
- Length: 40:27
- Label: Fontana, Topic

Martin Carthy chronology
Martin Carthy (1965)	Martin Carthy's Second Album (1966)

Martin Carthy is the debut solo album by English folk musician Martin Carthy, originally released in 1965 by Fontana Records and later re-issued by Topic Records. The album features Dave Swarbrick playing fiddle or mandolin on a number of the tracks. Swarbrick was not headlined on the album for contractual reasons as he was with the Ian Campbell Folk Group at the time with permission granted by Transatlantic Records.

The song notes on the album are written by Martin with Ian Campbell writing the introduction.

All the tracks are Traditional except "Springhill Mine Disaster". which was written by Ewan MacColl and Peggy Seeger following the 1958 disaster and "The Wind That Shakes the Barley" which was written by Robert Dwyer Joyce.

== Track listing ==
The references after the titles below are from the three major numbering schemes for traditional folk songs, the Roud Folk Song Index, Child Ballad Numbers and the Laws Numbers.
All tracks Traditional, arranged by Martin Carthy; except where indicated

No.	Title	Writer(s)	Length
1.	"High Germany" (Roud 904)	Cecil Sharp	2:31
2.	"The Trees They Do Grow High" (Roud 31; Laws O35)		3:31
3.	"Sovay" (Roud 7; Laws N21)	adapted by A. L. Lloyd	2:09
4.	"Ye Mariners All" (Roud 1191)		1:47
5.	"The Queen of Hearts" (Roud 3195)		2:21
6.	"Broomfield Hill" (Roud 34; Child 43)		2:51
7.	"Springhill Mine Disaster"	Ewan MacColl, Peggy Seeger	4:21
8.	"Scarborough Fair" (Roud 12; Child 2)		3:25
9.	"Lovely Joan" (Roud 592)	arranged by Dave Swarbrick	1:49
10.	"The Barley & The Rye" (Roud 23268)		1:39
11.	"The Wind That Shakes the Barley" (Roud 2994)	Robert Dwyer Joyce	4:26
12.	"The Two Magicians" (Roud 1350; Child 44)	adapted by A. L. Lloyd	3:23
13.	"The Handsome Cabin Boy" (Roud 239; Laws N13)		3:24
14.	"And A Begging I Will Go" (Roud 286)	arranged by Dave Swarbrick	2:54

== Personnel ==
- Martin Carthy - guitar, vocals
- Dave Swarbrick - fiddle, mandolin (uncredited)

Technical

- Tony Engle - sleeve design
- Ian Campbell, Martin Carthy - sleeve notes

== Album information ==
- First released in the UK 1965 by Fontana Records STL 5269 (Stereo) / TL5269 (Mono)
- Re-issued 1977 by Topic Records 12TS340 with 5 other Martin Carthy albums
- CD issued 1993 by Topic Records TSCD340
- 180g vinyl limited edition 50th anniversary release re-issue for Record Store Day 18 April 2015 by Topic records 12TS2015
