= Dando Shaft =

British band

- Genres: Psychedelic folk, folk jazz, progressive folk
- Years active: 1968–1973, 1977, 1989
- Labels: Young Blood, Neon/RCA, Rubber
- Past members: Kevin Dempsey; Martin Jenkins; Ted Kay; Roger Bullen; Dave Cooper; Polly Bolton

Dando Shaft is the name of a short-lived psychedelic/progressive folk and folk jazz band that was primarily active in the early 1970s. The band has attracted a measure of attention from recent compilation releases and Dando Shaft is today known primarily as one of the major influences on the progressive stream of the 1960s folk revival.

== History ==
Forming in Coventry, England, in 1968, the original Dando Shaft was a quintet composed of the two guitar/vocalists Kevin Dempsey and Dave Cooper, multi-instrumentalist Martin Jenkins, bassist Roger Bullen, and tabla/percussionist Ted Kay. The band's name was taken from that of the title character of a 1965 novel by Don Calhoun. Performing in local English venues for the next two years while remaining active in the folk revival scene, the band was offered a recording deal with Young Blood Records and in 1970 they recorded their debut, An Evening With Dando Shaft. The album was well-received, drawing immediate comparison to the work of fellow folk revival musicians Pentangle, but demonstrating more of an emphasis on original folk compositions as well as showcasing a more progressive use of bluegrassy multi-instrumentation (especially due to Martin Jenkins's diverse talents) and Balkan (particularly Bulgarian) rhythmic structures.

Comparisons to Pentangle were only enhanced when, after moving to London in 1970, the band grew in October of that year to include Leamington Spa singer Polly Bolton, who had previously sung with June Tabor. Bolton's contributions to the band received praise with her voice described as pure and expressive and Bolton herself has been described as a half-forgotten female vocalist of the era ranking alongside Pentangle's Jacqui McShee as well as other contemporary legends like Shirley Collins, Sandy Denny, and Maddy Prior. Creating an even more favorable impression on critics, Dando Shaft were soon signed to RCA's progressive offshoot Neon, and in 1971 they created the eponymous album, Dando Shaft.

Despite warm critical reviews of the first two albums, neither achieved a great deal of commercial success. Nevertheless, in 1972 Dando Shaft was moved from Neon to the RCA parent label to release Lantaloon. Receiving fewer accolades for this effort than for the previous two albums, and with even less prospect of commercial success, the band began to move in the direction of mainstream rock eventually resulting in the single "Sun Clog Dance". This shift, however, caused internal dissension and the band soon broke up with Dempsey and Bolton forming a duo for a time in the USA, and Jenkins joining Hedgehog Pie on the Newcastle-upon-Tyne label Rubber Records.

A few years later Rubber extended a recording deal to the duo of Jenkins and Cooper, and at this point Dempsey, Bolton, and Kay expressed an interest in recording again as Dando Shaft. Rubber was supportive of this decision and the band's short-lived reunion resulted in the 1977 release of Kingdom, a significantly more electric offering. This album also included a number of prominent guest musicians including Pentangle double-bassist Danny Thompson as well as drummer John Stevens, saxophone player Paul Dunmall, electric bassist Rod Clements, and keyboard player Tommy Kearton all performing on individual tracks.

During the mid-1980s Jenkins and Dempsey reunited as members of Whippersnapper with Dave Swarbrick and Chris Leslie, occasionally performing Dando Shaft material. During this time Bolton also engaged in a successful solo career, eventually joining The Albion Band. Jenkins and Cooper also performed with Pentangle's Bert Jansch for a period during which time Bolton and Jansch had a brief 1-year relationship. Jenkins and Jansch released Carry Your Smile in 1984.

At last in 1989, at the encouragement of an Italian promoter, Dando Shaft re-formed for a week-long concert series in Italy. An Italian live album Shadows Across the Moon was released in 1993 from material recorded during this session.

Most recently, compilation/anthology albums of Dando Shaft material have been released with Reaping the Harvest released in 1990 and Anthology released in 2002 (rereleased in 2005).

== Influences ==
Apart from the traditional themes of English and Irish folklore redolent throughout the folk revival, the most notable influence on Dando Shaft was that of contemporary folk band Pentangle. Other elements unique to the Dando Shaft sound, however, included the progressive use of Bulgarian tempos, a more multi-instrumental approach, and a psychedelic sound reminiscent of the works of Scottish contemporaries The Incredible String Band.

== Personnel ==
- Kevin Dempsey – Guitar, Vocals
- Martin Jenkins – Vocals, Flute, Mandolin, Fiddle, Guitar
- Ted Kay – Tabla, Percussion
- Roger Bullen – Bass
- Dave Cooper – Guitar, Vocals
- Polly Bolton (1970 onward) – Vocals

== Discography ==
=== Studio albums ===
- An Evening With Dando Shaft (Young Blood, 1970)
- Dando Shaft (Neon(RCA), 1971) AUS No. 41
- Lantaloon (RCA, 1972)
- Kingdom (Rubber Records, 1977)

=== Live albums ===
- Shadows Across the Moon (Happy Trails, 1993)

=== Anthologies and compilations ===
- Reaping the Harvest (See for Miles, 1990)
- Anthology (RPM Vinyl, 2002)

=== Singles ===
- "Sun Clog Dance" (RCA, 1972)
