= Hedgehog Pie =

British folk rock group

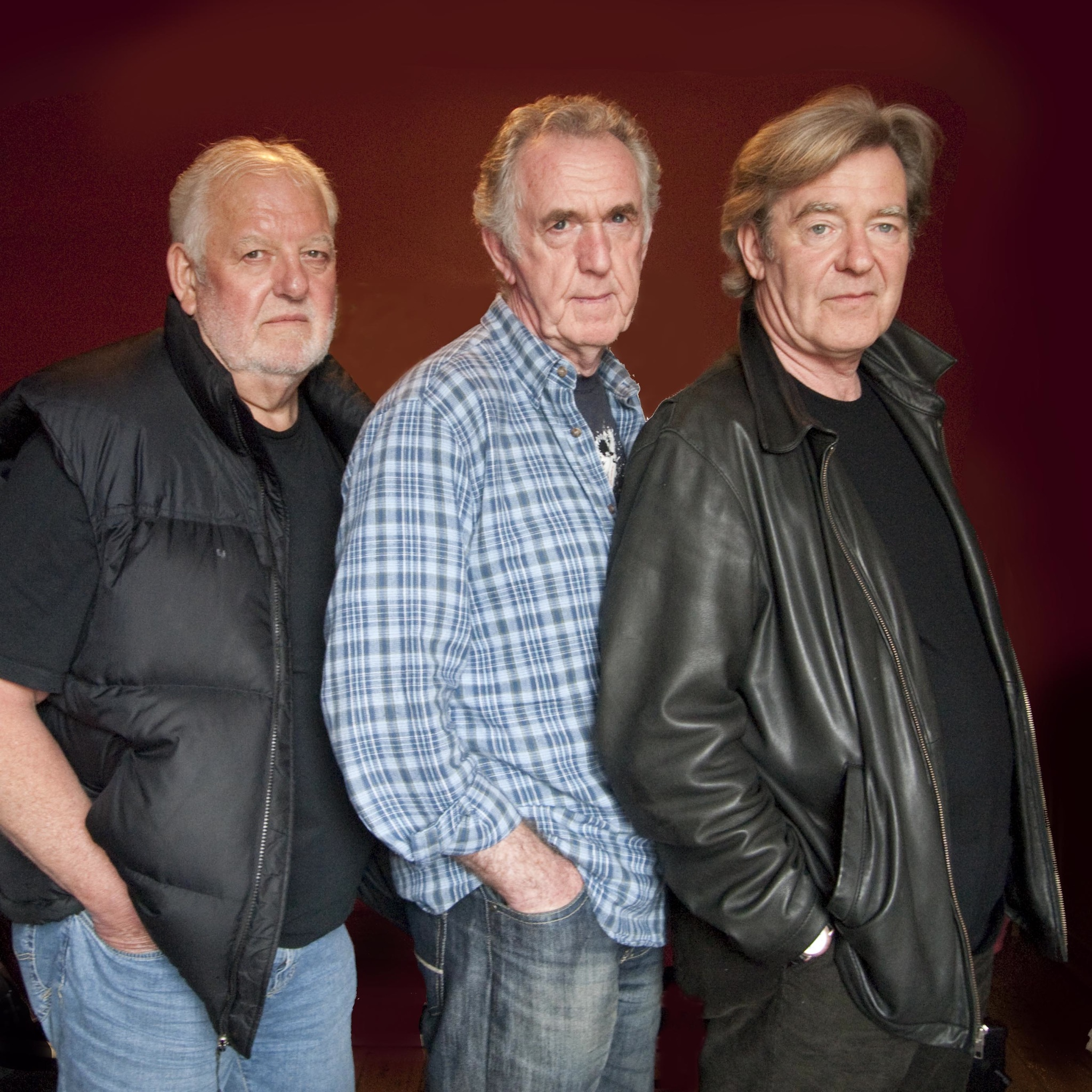
- Hedgehog Pie in May 2010

Background information
- Origin: England
- Genres: Folk, British folk rock
- Years active: 1971–78
- Labels: Rubber Records; Black Crow Records
- Past members: Dave Burland - Alan Dixon - Mick Doonan - Ian 'Walter' Fairbairn - Jed Grimes - Martin Jenkins - Stu Luckley - Margi Luckley - Phil Murray - Andy Seagroat
- Website: https://www.jedgrimes.co.uk

Hedgehog Pie were a British folk rock group from the north-east of England, that evolved between 1969 and 1971. Despite frequent line-up changes, they built up a considerable regional and national following and produced three highly regarded albums. They were connected to many of the most important folk and rock bands of the region from the 1970s and have been seen as one of the most significant groups in a rediscovery and popularisation of Northumbrian roots music.

== History ==
=== Origins ===
The origins of Hedgehog Pie were in a loose collection of folk musicians in Newcastle-upon-Tyne from 1969. It started in Hebburn when brothers Mick and Kevin Doonan and brothers Phil and Jim Murray started playing together in local pubs and clubs. By 1971 it had solidified into two members of the Doonan Family Band, Mick Doonan (flute) and Phil Murray (bass), together with Jed Grimes (guitar) and Andy Seagroat (fiddle). This line-up acted as a backing group to Tony Capstick on his album His Round. In 1972 they added another Doonan Family Band member Stu Luckley (guitar and bass), plus his wife Margi Luckley (vocals) and Ian 'Walter' Fairbairn (fiddle). Fairbairn and Murray soon departed to join local band Jack the Lad, formed out of the split in Lindisfarne, and the group replaced them with Martin Jenkins (violin) from Dando Shaft. It seems to have been at this point that they adopted electric instruments. The reputation of Doonan and Jenkins probably helped them to secure them a contract with local label Rubber Records and it was this line-up that recorded the first album.

=== Recordings ===
The self-titled first album (1975) owed something to Jethro Tull (in Doonan's flute), Fairport Convention (the heavily strummed guitars), but, perhaps unsurprisingly for an album co-produced by Geoff Heslop and Steeleye Span's Rick Kemp, it owed most to the early work of that band in the use of heavy plucked bass, no drums and Margi Luckley's vocals which closely resembled those of Maddy Prior. It contained a mix of instrumentals and ballads, including 'Marriners' and 'Jack Orion'. The album was a critical success, if not a commercial one, and they gained a growing reputation as live performers, both as a headline band and supporting acts such as Richard Thompson, Mike Harding and John Martyn. Their reputation was aided by the release of the instrumental 'Drops of Brandy' on the important compilation The Electric Muse (1975).

They were joined by drummer Alan Dixon before embarking on their next album The Green Lady (1975). Also produced by Heslop and Kemp, this recording demonstrated that their style had rapidly moved on, incorporating elements of jazz and hard rock and was much more individual. Beside traditional songs, including 'The Gardiner' and 'The Burning of Auchendoon', the album also included more original compositions, such as 'Daemon Merchant' by Doonan and 'Dreamer' by Jenkins.

The album was well received and the band soon embarked on recording a 'concept' EP of four tracks under the title The Wonderful Legend of the Lambton Worm, which dealt with the local folk tale of a giant serpent, The Lambton Worm, occupying the village of Lambton. Very few copies were pressed and it has become much sought by collectors.

=== Disbandment ===
In the summer of 1976 most of the members left the band with the exception of Doonan and Grimes. Stu Luckley teamed up with folksinger Bob Fox in a well regarded duo and Martin Jenkins appeared in a number of outfits including with Bert Jansch, Matthews Southern Comfort and Dave Swarbrick's Whippersnapper. The remaining members recruited established solo stylist Dave Burland (guitar and vocals)and shifted to a largely acoustic format.

This line-up produced one album, Just Act Normal (1979), for Black Crow Records. It consisted largely of a return to traditional material on acoustic instruments. With polished production from Heslop alone this time, like the other two albums it topped the Melody Maker folk chart, but mainstream success evaded the group and they broke up soon after.

Grimes went on to form a successful duo with Stewart Hardy. In 2003 after producing and arranging some 40 tracks for the CD boxed set 'Northumbria Anthology,' Jed Grimes formed 6-piece band The Hush and received two Radio 2 Folk Award Nominations for their album 'Dark To The Sky'. Since then he has toured solo and released a solo CD, 'Head On' which emerged to rave reviews and many festival appearances. Dave Burland returned to his solo career. Doonan returned to playing in the Doonan Family Band (later to be rejoined by Stu Luckley) and in the Soul and R&B outfit the Solicitors.

Parts of the group's recordings have surfaced as CDs, but these have generally been of low quality and limited availability. In 2003 a recording of one of their live performances was issued as Hedgehog Pie Live (2003).

=== Revival ===
In 2010, Dave Burland, Mick Doonan and Jed Grimes reformed Hedgehog Pie. The new line-up also included original bass player Phil Murray and percussionist Bryan Ledgard.

Martin Jenkins (born 17 July 1946, London, England) died on 17 May 2011, in Sofia, Bulgaria, from a heart attack.

== Significance ==
Hedgehog Pie were the result of the flourishing folk revival in northern England and the attempts to extend the electric folk movement in the region. They matured rapidly into a promising and highly proficient outfit and although the group failed to achieve mainstream recognition, they still retain a local and cult following in the context of northern folk music.

== Band members ==
- Dave Burland (guitar and vocals)
- Alan Dixon (drums)
- Mick Doonan (flute)
- Ian 'Walter' Fairbairn (violin)
- Jed Grimes (guitar)
- Martin Jenkins (violin)
- Stu Luckley (guitar and bass)
- Margi Luckley (vocals)
- Phil Murray (bass)
- Andy Seagroat (violin)
- Michael (Domino) McCormick (vocals)

== Discography ==
- His Round with Tony Capstick (Rubber, 1971)
- Hedgehog Pie (Rubber, 1975)
- The Green Lady (Rubber, 1975)
- The Wonderful Legend of the Lambton Worm (EP) (Rubber, 1976)
- Just Act Normal (Rubber, 1978)
- Hedgehog Pie Live! (Blue Guitar, 2003)
