= High Germany =

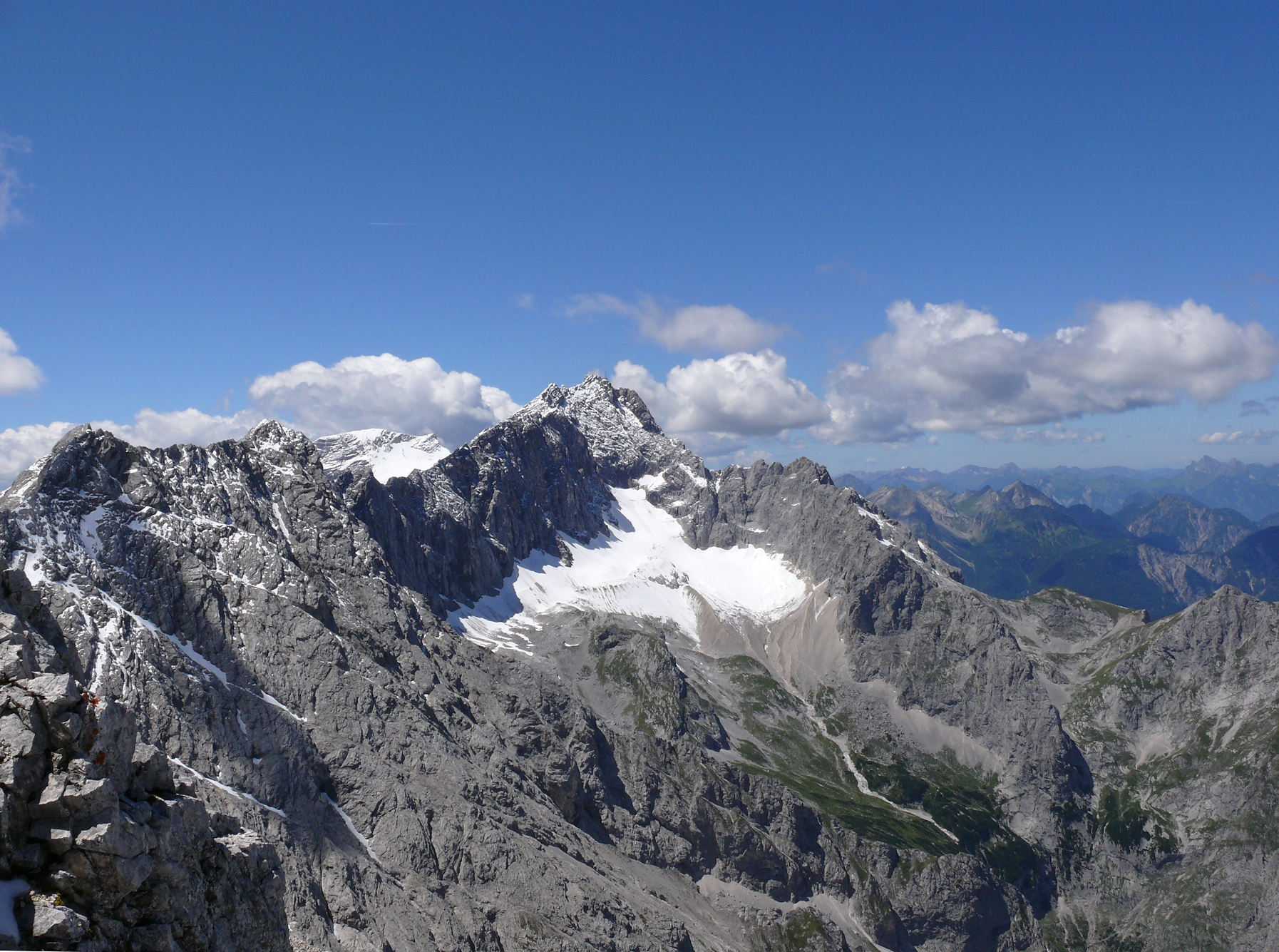
The German side of Zugspitze, the tallest point in Germany and part of the Austro-Bavarian border

High Germany (German: Hochdeutschland) is a geographical term referring to the mountainous southern part of Germany. The term is first found in medieval Latin as Germania Superior, for example in chapter 23 of the Imago mundi of Honorius Augustodunensis (12th century, Regensburg): Ab Danubio usque ad Alpes est Germania Superior, "From the Danube to the Alps is High Germany".

== In German ==
In German, the term Hochdeutschland to mean Alpine Germany was not uncommon in the 16th century, and was still so used by the Brothers Grimm in the 19th, but has largely fallen out of use. However, when the Republic of Austria was founded in 1918, Hochdeutschland was one of the proposals made for a name for the new country.

The adjective hochdeutsch, meaning Southern German, is most commonly used in the context of language: High German refers to all dialects of the German language spoken south of the Benrath line. However, since the standard German language grew mostly out of a High German dialect, modern colloquial German often uses the word Hochdeutsch to mean official language as opposed to any dialect (even those dialects which linguists call "high German"). As a result, the nouns Hochdeutscher and Hochdeutschland can occasionally be heard in German used jokingly to refer to the political establishment, or to the region around Hannover which is often associated with the standard language, despite belonging to the traditional Low German area and having an appropriate Northern regiolect.

== In English ==
In English, the term High Germany is rather dated as a geographical term, but it is still familiar from the traditional song "High Germany", which refers to the War of the Spanish Succession.

== See also ==
- High German
- High Germany (folk song)
