= Scarborough Fair (ballad) =

Traditional English song

"Scarborough Fair" (Roud 12, Child 2) is a traditional Northern English ballad. The song lists a number of impossible tasks given to a former lover who lives in Scarborough, North Yorkshire. The "Scarborough/Whittingham Fair" variant was most common in Yorkshire and Northumbria, where it was sung to various melodies, often using Dorian mode, with refrains resembling "parsley, sage, rosemary and thyme" and "Then she'll be a true love of mine." A version appears in Traditional Tunes (1891) by Frank Kidson, who claims to have collected it from Whitby.

The melody best known today was collected from Mark Anderson (1874–1953), a retired lead miner from Middleton-in-Teesdale, County Durham, England, by Ewan MacColl in 1947. This version was recorded by a number of musicians in the 20th century, including the 1966 arrangement in counterpoint by the American folk rock duo Simon & Garfunkel, who learned the ballad from Martin Carthy. A slightly different rendition of the ballad (referred to as "The Cambric Shirt", or "Parsley, Sage, Rosemary and Thyme") had been recorded by John Lomax in 1939 in the United States. Sarah Brightman also performed it as part of her album La Luna from the year 2000.

== History ==
The lyrics of "Scarborough Fair" appear to have something in common with a Scottish ballad titled "The Elfin Knight", collected by Francis James Child as Child Ballad #2, which has been traced as far back as 1670. In this ballad, an elf threatens to abduct a young woman to be his lover unless she can perform an impossible task ("For thou must shape a sark to me / Without any cut or heme, quoth he"); she responds with a list of tasks that he must first perform ("I have an aiker of good ley-land / Which lyeth low by yon sea-strand").

Dozens of versions existed by the end of the 18th century. A number of older versions refer to locations other than Scarborough Fair, including Wittingham Fair, Cape Ann, "twixt Berwik and Lyne", etc. Many versions do not mention a place name and are often generically titled ("The Lovers' Tasks", "My Father Gave Me an Acre of Land", etc.).

The references to the traditional English gathering "Scarborough Fair", and the refrain "parsley, sage, rosemary, and thyme", date to 19th-century versions, and may have been borrowed from the ballad Riddles Wisely Expounded (Child Ballad #1), which has a similar plot.

== Lyrics and melodies ==
The lyrics published by Frank Kidson in 1891 represent the most widely recognized version of the song. However, subsequent performers have frequently selected and rearranged verses. Martin Carthy, for example, replaced the final verse with a repetition of the opening stanza, while Simon and Garfunkel recorded a sequence consisting of verses 1, 2, 5, and 7, concluding with a reprise of the first verse. This latter arrangement has been widely adopted by later artists. The following are the lyrics as published by Kidson:

The male:
O, where are you going? To Scarborough Fair?
Savoury, sage, rosemary and thyme,
Remember me to a lass that lives there,
For she was once a true love of mine.

And tell her to make me a cambric shirt,
Savoury, sage, rosemary and thyme,
Without any seam or needlework,
And then she shall be a true love of mine.

And tell her to wash it in yonder dry well,
Savoury, sage, rosemary and thyme,
Where no water sprung nor a drop of rain fell,
And then she shall be a true love of mine.

And tell her to dry it on yonder thorn,
Savoury, sage, rosemary and thyme,
Which never bore blossom since Adam was born,
And then she shall be a true love of mine.

The female:
O, will you find me an acre of land,
Savoury, sage, rosemary and thyme,
Between the sea foam and the sea sand,
Or never you'll be a true love of mine.

O, will you plough it with a ram's horn,
Savoury, sage, rosemary and thyme,
And sow it all over with one peppercorn,
Or else you'll be a true love of mine.

Or will you reap it with a sickle of leather,
Savoury, sage, rosemary and thyme,
And tie it all up with a peacock's feather,
Or never you'll be a true love of mine.

And when you have done and have finished your work,
Savoury, sage, rosemary and thyme,
You can come to me for your cambric shirt,
And then you shall be a true love of mine.

=== Alternative refrains ===
The oldest versions of "The Elfin Knight" (circa 1650) contain the refrain "my plaid away, my plaid away, the wind shall not blow my plaid away." Slightly more recent versions often contain one of a group of related refrains:

- "Sober and grave grows merry in time"
- "Every rose grows merry with time"
- "There's never a rose grows fairer with time"
- "Whilst every grove rings with a merry antine" (Note: For "antine", see the French word antienne ('chant' or 'refrain').)

These are usually paired with "Once (s)he was a true love of mine" or some variant. "Parsley, sage, rosemary and thyme" may simply be an alternate rhyming refrain to the original based on a corruption of "grows merry in time" into "rosemary and thyme".

=== Anderson melody ===
The version of the melody best-known today was sung to Ewan MacColl in 1947 by Mark Anderson (1874–1953), a retired lead miner from Middleton-in-Teesdale, County Durham, England. No audio recording of Anderson's version was ever made, although Alan Lomax recorded Anderson singing other songs in 1951. MacColl printed the lyrics and melody in a book of Teesdale folk songs, and later included it on his and Peggy Seeger's The Singing Island in 1960.

== Recordings ==
Solo soprano voice

=== Field recordings ===
Early audio field recordings of the ballad include the following examples:

- Georgia Ann Griffin of Newberry, Alachua, Florida. Recorded by John Lomax in 1939.
- Allie Long Parker of Hogscald Hollow, Eureka Springs, Arkansas. Recorded by Mary Parler on 7 April 1958.
- Sara Cleveland of Brant Lake, New York. Recorded by Sandy Paton in 1966.
- Elizabeth "Liz" Jefferies. Recorded in Bristol by Barry and Chris Morgan in 1976.

=== Commercial recordings ===
==== 1950s ====
The earliest commercial recording of the ballad was made by actors and singers Gordon Heath and Lee Payant, Americans who ran a café and nightclub, L'Abbaye, on the Rive Gauche in Paris. The recording appeared on the 1955 Elektra album Encores from the Abbaye. The song was also included on the 1956 album The English and Scottish Popular Ballads vol IV by A. L. Lloyd and Ewan MacColl, using Kidson's melody.

The first recorded version using the best-known melody was performed by Audrey Coppard on the 1956 album English Folk Songs. A decade after collecting the song, MacColl released his own version, accompanied by Peggy Seeger on guitar, on the 1957 LP Matching Songs of the British Isles and America and an a capella rendition another decade later on the 10-CD collection The Long Harvest (1967).

Milt Okun and Ellen Stekert recorded the song as "The Cambric Shirt" on their 1957 album Traditional American Love Songs. David Dicaire, in his 2011 book The Folk Music Revival. Biographies Of Fifty Performers And Other Influential People, called Stekert and Okun's version a "folk classic".

==== 1960s ====
In 1965, Martin Carthy sang "Scarborough Fair" on his eponymous debut album after having picked up the tune from the songbook by MacColl and Seeger.

Marianne Faithfull recorded the song for her second American studio album Go Away from My World, released in December 1965.

"Scarborough Fair/Canticle" appeared as the lead track on the 1966 Simon & Garfunkel album Parsley, Sage, Rosemary and Thyme in counterpoint with "Canticle", a reworking of the lyrics from Simon's 1963 anti-war song "The Side of a Hill". The duo learned their arrangement of the song from Martin Carthy, but did not credit him as the arranger. They later made a "pretty substantial" monetary settlement with Carthy's publisher when asked, but unbeknownst to them, Carthy himself did not receive anything from it.

Sérgio Mendes and Brasil '66 scored a U.S. No. 16 hit (#2 AC) with their light jazz/samba/pop version in 1968, which was used in the 1973 animated film Heavy Traffic.

In 1969, Vicky Leandros recorded the song in several versions for release throughout Europe, Canada and Japan, singing in English, German, French ("Chèvrefeuille que tu es loin") and Greek ("Νά Θυμάσαι Πώς Μ' αγαπάς").

The song is the last track featured in Bobbie Gentry's and Glen Campbell's 1968 collaborative album Bobbie Gentry and Glen Campbell.

==== 1980s ====
American folk punk band Cordelia's Dad recorded a version for their 1989 self-titled debut album.

The Stone Roses set their own words to the melody for "Elizabeth My Dear", a track on their eponymous debut album (1989).

Philadelphia punk band Tons of Nuns recorded the song on their second demo and performed the song live on WXPN.

==== 1990s ====
Queensrÿche included a version as the B-side of their single "Anybody Listening?" in 1992. It was later included as a bonus track on the 2003 reissue of their album Empire.

==== 2000s ====
Celtic Woman recorded a version of the song for their third album A New Journey, released in January 2007.

The English death-doom metal band My Dying Bride recorded a version with two additional stanzas by its lead singer Aaron Stainthorpe, which appears on its 2009 EP Bring Me Victory.

German/Norwegian symphonic metal band Leaves' Eyes recorded a version of this song on their 2009 album Njord.

==== 2010s ====
Nox Arcana recorded a ghost-story version with all original lyrics by Joseph Vargo for the 2012 album Winter's Majesty.

In 2017, Aurora recorded the song for the Brazilian telenovela Deus Salve o Rei along with an opening sequence for it.

==== 2020s ====
In 2020, Dan Avidan & Super Guitar Bros released it as part of their first collaborative album.

In 2025, Oli Steadman included it on his song collection "365 Days Of Folk".

In 2026, Dorian Electra included it on their self-titled EP of covers.

=== Simon & Garfunkel version ===
"Scarborough Fair/Canticle"
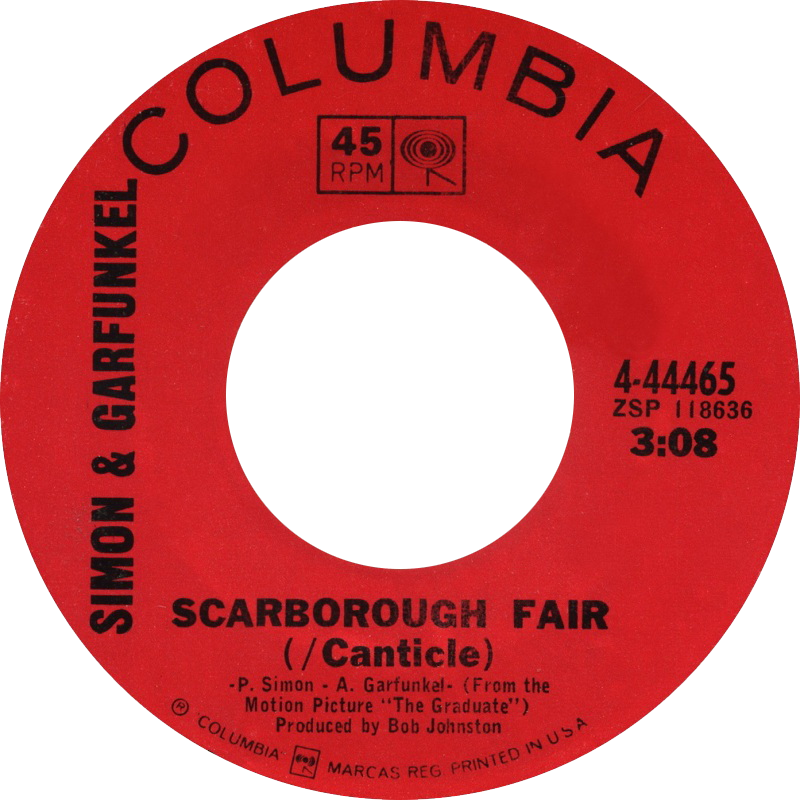
- Side-A label of the 1968 US vinyl single

Single by Simon & Garfunkel

from the album Parsley, Sage, Rosemary and Thyme
- B-side: "April Come She Will"
- Released: February 1968
- Recorded: 26 July 1966
- Genre: Folk; baroque pop
- Length: 3:10 (album version and single edit); 6:22 (The Graduate soundtrack)
- Label: Columbia
- Songwriters: Paul Simon; Art Garfunkel ("Canticle")
- Producer: Bob Johnston

Simon & Garfunkel singles chronology
"Fakin' It" (1967)	"Scarborough Fair/Canticle" (1968)	"Mrs. Robinson" (1968)

Music video
- "Scarborough Fair/Canticle" (audio) on YouTube

In London in 1965, Paul Simon learned the song from Martin Carthy, who had picked up the song from the songbook by MacColl and Seeger and included it on his eponymous 1965 album. Simon & Garfunkel set it in counterpoint with "Canticle", a reworking of the lyrics from Simon's 1963 anti-war song "The Side of a Hill"; they used the tune score provided to Paul Simon by Carthy, while Simon's anti-war lyrics were set to a new melody composed mainly by Art Garfunkel. "Scarborough Fair/Canticle" appeared as the lead track on the 1966 album Parsley, Sage, Rosemary and Thyme, and was released as a single after it had been featured on the soundtrack to The Graduate in 1968. The copyright credited only Simon and Garfunkel as the authors, which upset Carthy, who felt that the "traditional" source should have been credited. The rift persisted until Simon invited Carthy to perform the song with him as a duet in a concert at London's Hammersmith Apollo in October 2000. Simon performed the song with the Muppets when he guest-starred on season 5, episode 11 of The Muppet Show (October 18, 1980).

Before Simon learned the song, Bob Dylan had borrowed the melody and several lines of lyrics from Carthy's arrangement to create his song "Girl from the North Country", which is featured on The Freewheelin' Bob Dylan (1963), Nashville Skyline (1969) (with Johnny Cash), Real Live (1984) and The 30th Anniversary Concert Celebration (1993).

==== Charts ====
Chart performance for "Scarborough Fair/Canticle"
Chart (1968)	Peak position
Australia (Kent Music Report)	49
Canada Top Singles (RPM)	5
US Billboard Hot 100	11

==== Certifications ====
Region	Certification	Certified units/sales
United Kingdom (BPI)	Silver	200,000^{‡}
^{‡} Sales+streaming figures based on certification alone.

=== Soundtrack recordings ===
The Simon and Garfunkel version of the song was featured on the soundtrack to The Graduate in 1968.

Instrumental versions of "Scarborough Fair" were arranged by Geoff Knorr for use in the video game Civilization VI as the main theme of the English civilization. As the themes of each civilization are played as different variations of the same song as the game progresses, four different variations of the song are included in the game's soundtrack, with Phill Boucher assisting Knorr in the arrangement of the Atomic Era version of the song.
