= The Beggars Chorus =

Song

Song

"The Beggars Chorus" (Roud 286, also known as "The Jovial Crew", "The Begging Song", "To the Begging", or "A-Begging We Will Go") is an English broadside ballad from the mid-18th century. It celebrates the life of a beggar, and treats begging as a legitimate English trade. Copies of the broadside can be found in the British Library, the National Library of Scotland, and the Huntington Library.

== Synopsis ==
This ballad tells the story of a beggar who was born lame and has a wooden leg. The beggar sings of his food, his drinks, and his dog. He sings of going to Pimlico with his fellow beggars, where they will all have drinks with girls. He brags of his skills as a beggar, and his ability to evoke pity in others. He lives in a hollowed out tree, and wonders why anybody would be a king when a beggar's life is so good.

== History ==
Joseph Woodfall Ebsworth attributes the song to Richard Brome, from his 1642 play, A Jovial Crew, or the Merry Beggars. However, the words to the song do not appear in the first printed version of the play (1652). However, the tune was well known before 1660, when it was used for the political ballad, "Colonel John Okie's Lamentation." Ebsworth tells us that the first known printed copy of the words was published in Wit and Mirth in 1684.

William Chappell argues that the song must have been improvised by an actor in the play, since it wasn't included in the first printed version. He also tells us that it was the archetype for a number of parodies: "A-bowling we will go," "A-hawking we will go," "A-fishing we will go," and "A-hunting we will go." The hunting version was especially popular under the name "The Stag Chase" in The Musical Miscellany (1731). "A-Hunting We Will Go" is attributed Thomas Arne, who wrote it for John Gay's The Beggar's Opera (1777).

Robert Ford prints a Scottish song, "A-Begging We Will Go" in his Vagabond Songs. He attributes the Scottish version to Alexander Ross, but says that the only similarity to the English version is the refrain and the measure. He attributes the English version to Richard Brome.

Ebsworth attributes the tone of Robert Burns' "The Jolly Beggars: A Cantata" (1785) and Matthew Arnold's "The Scholar Gipsy" (1853) directly to "The Beggars Chorus."

== Recordings ==
- Martin Carthy on his debut eponymous album, Martin Carthy (1965), accompanied by Dave Swarbrick. In 1990, the duo rewrote the song for their live album, Life and Limb. In the Life and Limb liner notes, Carthy and Swarbrick note that the rise of beggars on the streets in the 1990s is a political reason for revisiting the song.
- Harry Boardman recorded "To The Begging" on the compilation album, New Voices (1965) on Topic Records.
- Enoch Kent recorded "Tae the Begging" for the Topic Records compilation, New Voices From Scotland (1965)
- Ewan MacColl on The Manchester Angel (1966).
- Bob Davenport on Down the Long Road (1975)
- The Battlefield Band recorded "Tae the Begging" on At the Front (1978)
- Bob Fox and Stu Luckley on Nowt So Good'll Pass (1978). They re-recorded the song for Box of Gold (1997).
- Maddy Prior and the Carnival Band on Hang Up Sorrow and Care (1995).
- The Rakes on The Red-Haired Lad (1997)
- Frankie Armstrong and Brian Pearson on The Garden of Love (1999).
- Magpie Lane on Six For Gold (2002). In the liner notes, Magpie Lane calls "A Begging We Will Go" a staple of the English and Scottish folk revivals. They argue that beggars are portrayed as lazy and dirty in the popular press, whereas musicians and artists have tended to take a more romantic, or bohemian, view of begging.
- Bellowhead on Hedonism (2010).
- Jon Boden on A Folk Song a Day (2010).
