= Willy Taylor =

William Cowans "Willy" Taylor was born 5 January, 1916 –and died on 2 November, 2000. He was a fiddler from Northumberland, England. He performed with Joe Hutton and Will Atkinson as the Shepherds.

== Music career ==
He was born at Lilburn Tower near Wooler. When he was a boy, he learned the fiddle. He lost the first finger of his left hand while preparing food for sheep, and he temporarily switched to melodeon before returning to the fiddle.

For most of his life, he was a shepherd in the Cheviot Hills. He composed melodies in his head on the way home after a day of herding sheep. He attributed his musical style in part to the time he spent with Geordie Armstrong, a shepherd who was also a fiddler. He walked miles through hilly country to perform at dances and festivals in nearby villages.

He won competitions at Northumbrian Gatherings in the early 1950s, and he was recorded by Peter Kennedy for the BBC in 1954, playing both fiddle and melodeon.

He was a founding member of the Border Strathspey and Reel Society, based at Langholm in Dumfriesshire. He was also one of the leading members of the Alnwick Pipers' Society, who published several of his compositions in their two tunebooks.

In 1983, he recorded Harthope Burn, with the mouth organ player Will Atkinson and the piper Joe Hutton. This group, known as The Shepherds, travelled widely, playing at clubs and folk festivals across Britain. They also made some broadcasts, often with Alistair Anderson, the English concertina player. After his retirement from farming, he made a solo album Welcome to the Dene. Some recordings of his club performances, solo and with the Shepherds, are available on the FARNE folk audio archive.

== Partial list of compositions ==
Many of his songs are named after members of his extended family. "The Dene" refers to Middleton Dene, the last farm he worked before retiring.

- "The Pearl Wedding"
- "Tich's Reel"
- "Nancy Taylor's Reel"
- "Snowy Monday"
- "Shirley's Reel"
- "The Shining Pool"
- "Neil Taylor's Jig"
- "Christine Taylor's Jig"
- "Wee Kerry's Welcome to the Dene"
- "Farewell to the Dene"

== Discography ==
- Harthope Burn (MWM, 1983)
- Welcome to the Dene (as Willie Taylor, Common Ground, 1990)
- Northumberland Rant (Smithsonian Folkways, 1986, 1994, 1996)

compilations

- Ranting and Reeling (Topic, 1954, 1991)

== Sources ==
- Reg Hall's notes to Ranting and Reeling
- Bert Feintuch's notes to Northumberland Rant
- Interview with Willy Taylor and Will Atkinson on FARNE
