= Jeff Gerbino =

- Born: Jeff Gerbino; September 27, 1953 (age 72); Flushing, New York, U.S.
- Occupation: Stand-up comedian
- Years active: 1977–present
- Website: jeffgerbino.com

Jeff Gerbino (born September 27, 1953) is an American stand-up comedian, actor and former radio show host. Gerbino is the originator of professional stand-up comedy in the Twin Cities area of Minnesota.

== Early life ==
Born in Flushing, Queens, New York, and raised in Sea Cliff, Long Island to Francesco Gerbino and Marjorie Miller Gerbino, Jeff is the third of four boys.

== Career ==
In the 1970s, Gerbino moved to Minnesota and began a career as a radio show host. He soon left radio to create the stand-up comedy scene in St. Paul and Minneapolis. He soon met and recruited other comedians, including Louie Anderson, Jeff Cesario, Joel Hodgson and Stephanie Hodge to perform in the Union Building in northeast Minneapolis. In 1977, he met Scott Hansen at Twin Cities comedy club, Mickey Finn's.

Jeff moved to Los Angeles in the 1980s, where he worked at the Improv and at the Comedy Store. He later expanded his career to include acting.

== Stand-up style ==
Jeff once infamously prank called ahead of a show in Oklahoma where Jay Leno was scheduled to perform, and - impersonating Leno - negotiated a better deal for an upcoming show. Michael Keaton praised Jeff as "The poor man’s Jay Leno".
