= Dave Burland =

English folk singer and guitarist

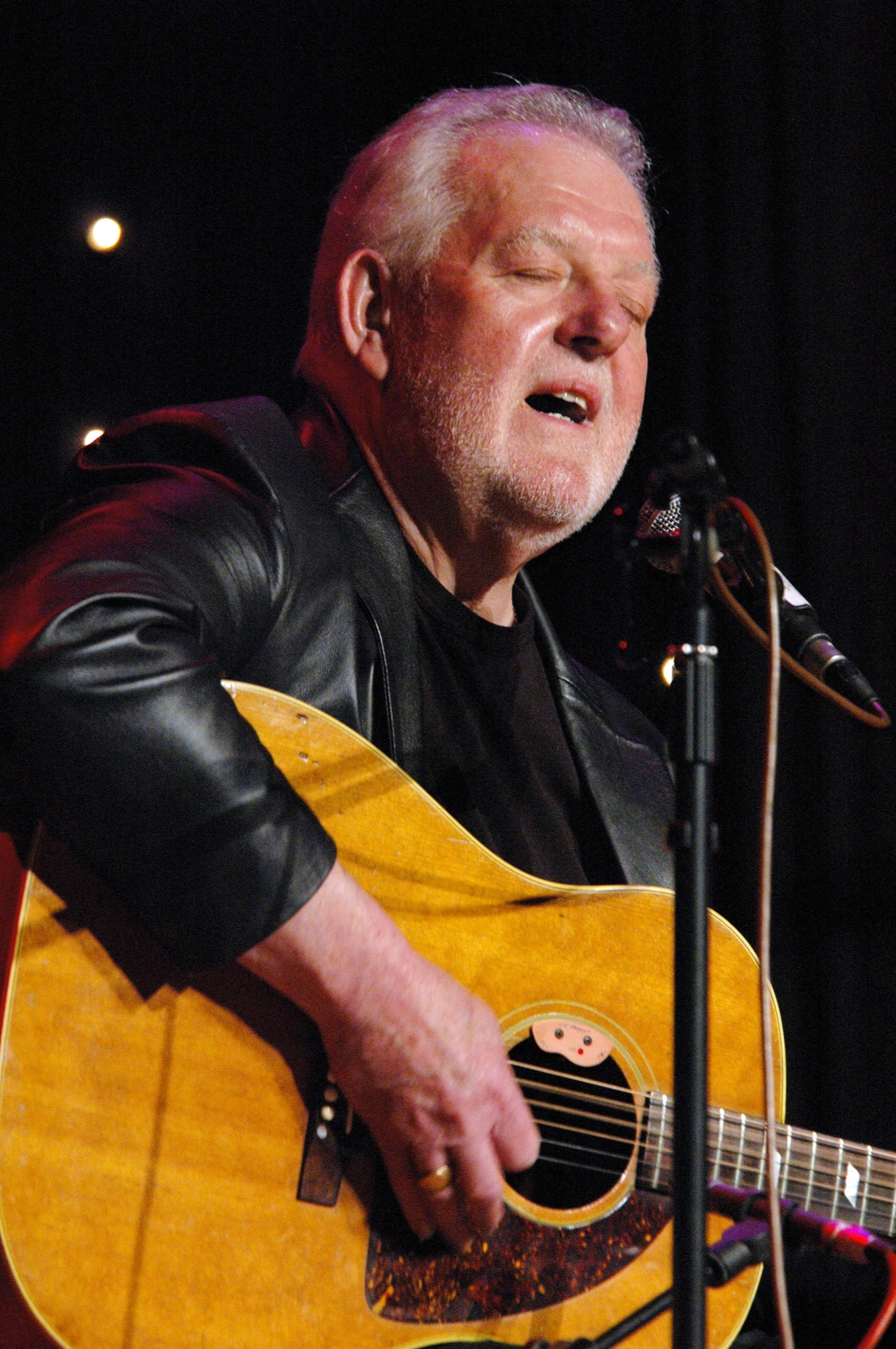

Background information
- Born: July 12, 1941 (age 85); Barnsley, West Riding of Yorkshire
- Origin: England
- Genres: Folk
- Occupation: Folk singer
- Instrument: Guitar

Dave Burland (born 12 July 1941, Barnsley, West Riding of Yorkshire, England) is an English folk singer and guitarist. A former policeman, he has been performing in English folk clubs since 1968 and has been described by The Guardian as having a "uniquely relaxed singing style".

In 1976 Burland joined the folk group Hedgehog Pie, which disbanded in 1978. He re-formed the group in 2010, with Mick Doonan and Jed Grimes.

He provided additional vocals on the track "Wild Goose" on Kate Rusby's award-winning 1999 album Sleepless.

== Discography ==
=== Solo albums ===
- A Dalesman's Litany (LP), Leader Records (LER 2029), 1971; reissued as CD (LERCD2029), 1999
- Dave Burland (LP), Trailer Records (LER 2082), 1972
- Songs & Buttered Haycocks (LP), Rubber Records (RUB 012), 1975
- You Can't Fool The Fat Man (LP), Rubber Records (RUB 036), 1979
- Rollin' (LP), Moonraker Music (MOO 6), 1984
- Willin' (LP), Black Crow Records (CRO 223), 1989
- His Master's Choice – The Songs Of Richard Thompson (CD), The Road Goes On Forever (RGFCD 009), 1994
- Benchmark (CD), Fat Cat Records (FATCD004), 1996

=== With Tony Capstick and Dick Gaughan ===
- Songs Of Ewan MacColl (LP), Rubber Records (RUB 027), 1978
- Songs Of Ewan MacColl (LP), Black Crow Records (CRO 215), 1978

=== With Hedgehog Pie ===
- Just Act Normal (LP), Rubber Records (RUB 024), 1978
- Hedgehog Pie Live! (CD), Blue Guitar (BGCD023), 2003

=== With the Awkward Squad ===
- Okkard (CD) Fat Cat Records, 2017

=== On compilation albums ===
- "William Taylor" on Voices – English Traditional Songs (CD), Fellside Recordings (ECD87), 1992
- "The Shape of A Girl" on Street Cries – A Collection Of Dark Traditional Songs Re-Set In The Present Day By Ashley Hutchings (CD), Topic Records (TSCD535), 2001
