= For One Pagan Brotherhood =

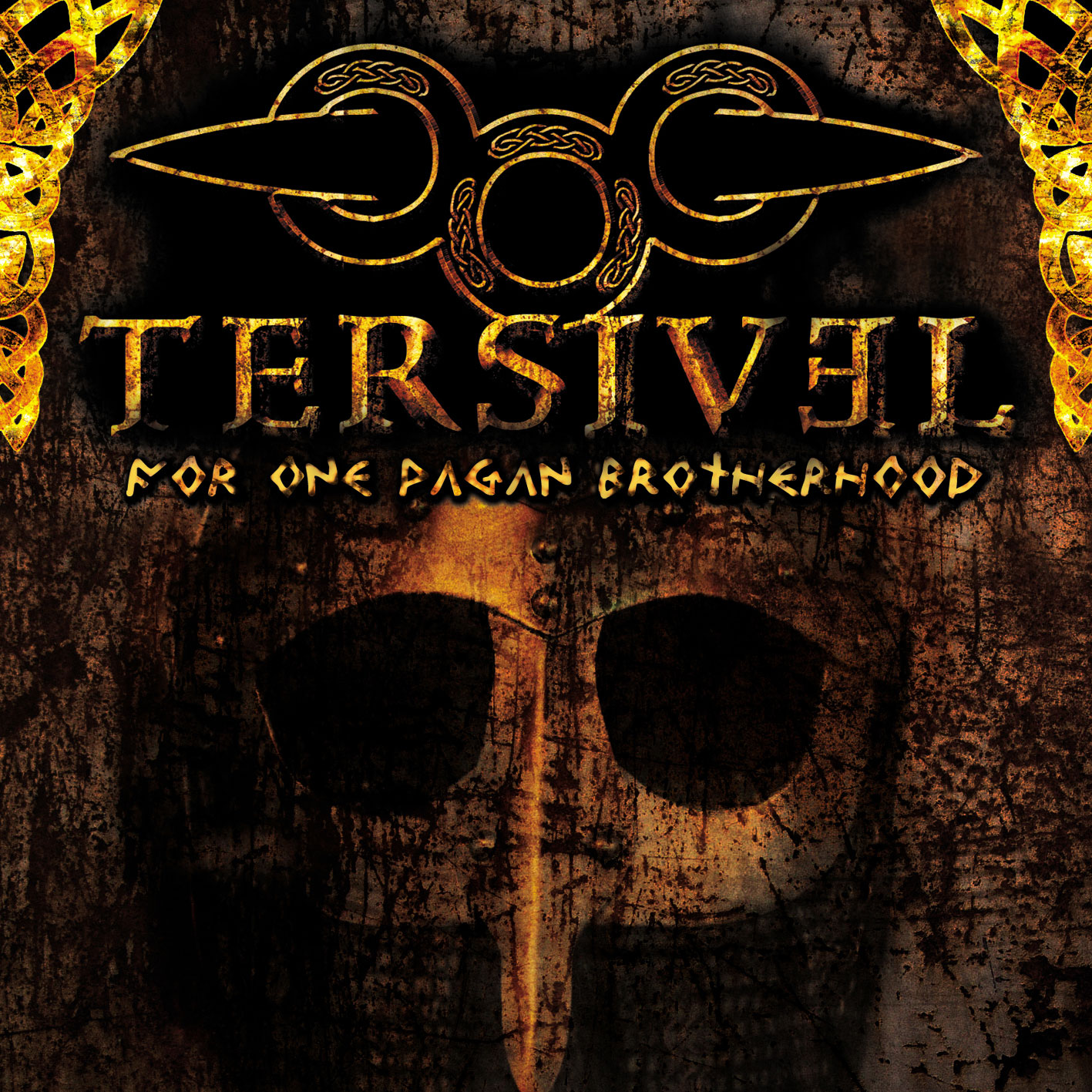

Studio album by Tersivel
- Released: February 26, 2011
- Recorded: November 2010 – January 2011 at Bear's Cave Studio in Buenos Aires, Argentina
- Genre: Pagan metal, folk metal
- Length: 58:13
- Label: Trinacria Media
- Producer: Tersivel

Professional ratings
Review scores
Source	Rating
Viking Land	9/10 stars
Encyclopaedia Metallum	8.5/10 stars
Encyclopaedia Metallum	8/10 stars
Guitarmasterclass Wiki	9.5/10 stars
Metalius	10/10 stars
Valkyrian Music	4.5/5 stars
Metal Storm (webzine)	8.8/10 stars
Metal Kingdom	9.2/10 stars
Metallized.it	6.7/10 stars
Web of Metal	4.4/5 stars
Darkport.org	4/5 stars
Sorrow Eternal	9/10 stars

For One Pagan Brotherhood is the first full-length album by Argentine pagan metal, folk metal band Tersivel. The album was released on February 26, 2011 through Trinacria Media.

== Background ==
Cruzat Beer House, mentioned in track 12, was an Irish craft beer pub in Buenos Aires, Argentina.

== Track listing ==
No.	Title	Lyrics	Music	Length
1.	"As Brothers We Shall Fight"	Gerbino	Gerbino, Robert, Närgrath	6:07
2.	"The Heathen Sun Of Revenge"	Gerbino	Gerbino, Robert, Närgrath	4:20
3.	"Far Away In The Distant Skies"	Gerbino	Gerbino, Robert, Närgrath	7:45
4.	"High Germany/Erin's Jig"	Traditional	High Germany: Traditional / Erin's Jig: Gerbino, Robert	4:37
5.	"And Fires Also Died Away"	Instrumental	Robert	3:07
6.	"Those Days Are Gone"	Gerbino	Gerbino	4:01
7.	"Tarantella Siciliana"	Instrumental	Gerbino	2:44
8.	"We Are The Fading Sun"	Gerbino	Gerbino, Robert	5:49
9.	"Aeolian Islands"	Instrumental	Gerbino	4:17
10.	"Cosa Nostra"	Gerbino, Närgrath	Gerbino, Robert, Närgrath	3:36
11.	"Pagan Nation"	Gerbino	Gerbino, Robert, Närgrath	7:48
12.	"Cruzat Beer House Song"	Gerbino	Gerbino, Robert	4:02
Total length:				58:13

== Personnel ==
Tersivel

- Lian Gerbino – vocals, electric guitar, acoustic guitar, bass, bodhram
- Nicolas Närgrath – growls, electric guitar
- Franco Robert – keyboards, piano

Additional musicians and production

- Xandru Reguera – Irish bouzouki, additional acoustic guitar
- The Drunken Choir – choir, backing vocals
- V. Fernandez – drums
- Nicolas Närgrath – sound engineer
- Franco Robert – sound engineer
- Lian Gerbino – sound engineer, audio mixing, mastering
