= Worship of the Gods =

Studio album by Tersivel
- Released: October 27, 2017
- Recorded: At White Door Studio and Advaitic Estudio in Buenos Aires, Argentina
- Genre: Pagan Metal, Folk Metal
- Length: 58:56
- Label: Independent
- Producer: Tersivel

Professional ratings
Review scores
Source	Rating
Folk-metal.nl	8/10 stars
Necromance	9.5/10 stars
Kaosguards	15/20 stars
Mister Folk	8/10 stars
PowerMetal.de	8.5/10 stars

Worship of the Gods is the second full-length album by Argentine pagan metal, folk metal band Tersivel. The album was released on October 27, 2017. The album refers to Julian, also known as Julian the Apostate, who was Roman Emperor from 361 to 363. He purged the top-heavy state bureaucracy and attempted to revive traditional Roman religious practices at the expense of Christianity.

== Track listing ==
All music is composed by Lian Gerbino and Franco Robert. Lyrics by Lian Gerbino except tracks 1 (by Ammianus Marcellinus), 9 (by Algernon Charles Swinburne) & 10 (by Julian).

No.	Title	Length
1.	"Deorum Statui Cultum"	1:20
2.	"Argentoratum"	5:04
3.	"This Day with Pride"	5:57
4.	"Live to Fight"	7:18
5.	"Hymn to King Helios"	6:47
6.	"Eleusinian Mysteries 354 A.D."	1:46
7.	"Satyrs Wine"	3:30
8.	"Dignitas"	4:20
9.	"Proserpina"	4:02
10.	"Bacchus"	1:13
11.	"Walls of Ctesiphon"	4:58
12.	"Vicisti Galilaee"	12:40
Total length:		58:56

== Personnel ==
Tersivel

- Lian Gerbino – vocals, electric guitar, acoustic guitar
- Franco Robert – keyboards, piano, accordion, backing vocals
- Camilo Torrado – bass, backing vocals
- Andrés Gualco – drums, percussion

Additional musicians and production

- Lucas Gerbino – darbuka on tracks 1 & 7
- Fabricio Faccioli – growls on track 3
- Lian Gerbino – sound engineer, audio mixing, mastering
