= Tersivel =

Argentine pagan metal band

- Origin: Buenos Aires, Argentina
- Genres: Pagan metal, Folk metal
- Years active: 2004–present
- Label: Independent
- Members: Lian Gerbino; Franco Robert; Danny Ebenholtz
- Website: www.tersivel-music.com

Tersivel is an Argentine pagan metal band from Buenos Aires, formed in 2004. Alongside bands such as Skiltron and Tengwar, they are considered one of the first folk metal bands from Argentina.

== History ==
Tersivel was formed in 2004 by Lian Gerbino in Buenos Aires, Argentina.

In 2006, Nicolás Nelson joined on growled vocals. A short time after the release of their first EP titled When She Sang..., all members, except Lian and Nicolás, decided to leave the band. By this time, Franco Robert joined Tersivel on keyboards, Sefirot on drums and Maxi Corbalán on bass guitar. Later Nicolás picked up the guitar and Lian decided to be in charge of clean vocals.

In August 2010, after many gigs and touring in the underground Argentine scene, Tersivel released their second EP titled Far Away In The Distant Skies creating a big expectation outside their country. By this time drummer Sefirot and bass player Maxi Corbalán left the band.

In January 2011, Hernán Martiarena joined Tersivel on drums.

On 26 February they released their first full-length album titled For One Pagan Brotherhood which has 12 tracks with a mix between Italian music, Sicilian music, Celtic music and extreme metal. There are some traditional folk instruments such as acoustic guitars, Irish bouzouki, and bodhran. This album counts with the participation of the folk musician Xandru Reguera from Argentine traditional Irish music band Na Fianna as a special guest on 2 tracks. All lyrics are written by Lian Gerbino and all of them are about paganism and pre-Christian history and fantasy.

In the last three months of 2011, the band released their first music video for the song 'As Brothers We Shall Fight'. Right after that, they started a Latin American tour including several countries and more than thirteen cities.

In January 2012, Camilo Torrado joins Tersivel as the official bass player. This year, Nicolás Nelson and Hernán Martiarena leave the band.

In January 2013, Tersivel released a new music video for the song 'Those Days Are Gone' with guest musician Xandru Reguera playing bouzouki, who actually played in the original song.

In 2014 the band has added a new drummer, Andrés Gualco, and on December 5, they released their third official music video, for "Argentoratum", which is the first track unveiled from their upcoming album.

In January 2015, Tersivel headlined Huarpe Cuyum festival in San Juan, Argentina, along with acts like Mastifal, Serpentor and Tren Loco.

In October 2017, the band released their second full-length album Worship of the Gods.

In December 2018, a single entitled 'Satyrs Wine Part II' is released along with an official video.

In 2020 the band returned, reinvigorated and reinspired, with a new single Embers Beneath The Spirit. Tersivel took a more organic approach to the recording, creating a blend that is hard to categorize. In the band's words "...(Tersivel) is a band of altering genres, perhaps centered around vivid soundscapes, where death/doom and post-metal converge. Paganism and heathenry, along with philosophical themes, are the lyrical spine providing support to the emotions of their music."

== Name ==
Tersivel is a word for gathering. The word was created in the context of an as-yet-unpublished Lian Gerbino's book about ancient times, paganism plus some fictional facts.

== Band members ==
Current members

- Lian Gerbino – lead vocals, guitars, bodhran (2004–present)
- Franco Robert – keyboards (2006–present)
- Danny Ebenholtz – drums (2019–present)

Live members

- Mauro Frison – drums (2010)
- Doug Bethencourt – bass (2010–2011)
- Ignacio López – bass (2011)
- Santiago Sauza – drums (2013)
- Joaquín Gomez – guitars (2013)

== Discography ==
- (2004) - Desde El Prado De Los Silencios (demo)
- (2006) - When She Sang... (demo)
- (2010) - Far Away In The Distant Skies (EP)
- (2011) - For One Pagan Brotherhood (Full-Length)
- (2014) - Argentoratum (Single)
- (2017) - Worship of the Gods (Full-Length)
- (2018) - Satyrs Wine Part II (Single)
- (2020) - Embers Beneath The Spirit (Single)
- (2022) - To the Orphic Void (Full-length)

== Videography ==
- (2011) - As Brothers We Shall Fight (Official Video)
- (2013) - Those Days Are Gone (Official Video)
- (2014) - Argentoratum (Official Video)
- (2018) - Satyrs Wine Part II (Official Video)
- (2020) - Embers Beneath The Spirit (Official Video)
