= David Haslam (conductor) =

English conductor (born 1940)

David Haslam (born 1940) is an English conductor. He is the Artistic Director and Conductor of the English Philharmonic Orchestra.

== Early life, family and education ==
Haslam was born in 1940, in Loughborough. While at school, he began learning the flute. He was put forward for a scheme, the Mason Plan, which allowed talented children to move to a grammar school. Here, he won the Walter Stokes Scholarship to The Royal Academy of Music at the age of 17.

Haslam studied flute under Professor Gareth Morris, Principal Flute of the New Philharmonia Orchestra. Additional coursework at the Academy included piano, history, and composition.

== Early career ==
Morris encouraged Haslam to accept available freelance work to gain orchestral experience. As a result, Haslam played Principal Flute in the orchestra. After representing Britain in the Brussels World's Fair, he started to take on engagements and provincial tours with opera companies such as Carl Rosa and the D'Oyly Carte Opera Company.

One such tour took him to Glasgow where he heard the Scottish National Orchestra was looking for a first flute, he applied and was immediately offered the post, although he was 19. He accepted and remained there under the baton of Sir Alexander Gibson until he was offered the position of principal flute in a then newly formed chamber orchestra called the Northern Sinfonia (NSO), which was based in Newcastle upon Tyne. Haslam, in addition to the post of principal flute, was offered an associate conductorship with responsibility for the Main Series programming. This extra post required him, in addition to planning the programmes for the Artistic Director and for all the guest artists, to also conduct multiple concerts at home and abroad.

Haslam worked with artists including John Lill, Ida Haendel, Radu Lupu, Sir Thomas Allan, Maurice Andre, Cecile Ousset, Paul Tortelier, Henryk Szeryng and Jean-Bernard Pommier.

Most of his flute playing was with the Royal Northern Sinfonia, although, several times he appeared as a guest player with the London Symphony Orchestra, the Liverpool Symphony Orchestra, the BBC Scottish Symphony Orchestra, the BBC Northern Symphony Orchestra, and The Academy of St Martin in the Fields. As a concerto player, he has performed with conductors including Sir Adrian Boult, Rudolf Schwarz, Sir Charles Groves, Richard Hickox, George Malcolm, Myung-Whun Chung, Tamas Vasary, Christopher Seaman and Malcolm Arnold, both in concert, and in BBC recordings.

Haslam's post required him to solo-direct a number of concerto performances with the Northern Sinfonia but he was also to appear as a solo director with the Royal Manchester College of Music Orchestra and the Ulster Orchestra. Most of his conducting was with the Northern Sinfonia, although he did guest-conduct on occasion with The Scottish Chamber Orchestra, The Ulster Orchestra, The Scottish National Orchestra and Manchester Camerata.

== Children's concerts ==
In order to expand the repertoire for the Northern Sinfonia's series of children's concerts, Haslam collaborated with Johnny Morris (of Animal Magic), and together they wrote six musical stories, with Haslam writing the music and Morris the words. These, together with pieces like Peter and the Wolf, formed the basis of the Sinfonia's Children's concerts for many years. These works for children have now been performed in Australia, the USA, and Norway, with Juanita the Spanish Lobster being recorded twice and all filmed for television.

== Northern songs ==
Over the years, Haslam has written more than 100 arrangements of northern songs, verses, and narrations. In 1988, he recorded his 1st set of orchestrations of Northern Songs with Sir Thomas Allen, Sheila Armstrong & the Northern Sinfonia orchestra & chorus. Since then he has recorded a second set and made a DVD featuring his Newcastle Overture and performances of his Songs of Northumbria sung by Sir Thomas Allen and Sheila Armstrong with the EPO in Durham Cathedral.

The recording of all the Field Piano Concertos, with Haslam, the NSO, and pianist Benjamin Frith, was praised by the critics.

== English Philharmonic Orchestra ==
Haslam and his partner Annamaria McCool left the NSO and formed the English Philharmonic Orchestra, a professional orchestra and ensemble that performs in northern England. McCool is the Administrator, and Haslam is the Principal Conductor and Artistic Director.
