= Bob Fox (musician) =

English folk guitarist and singer

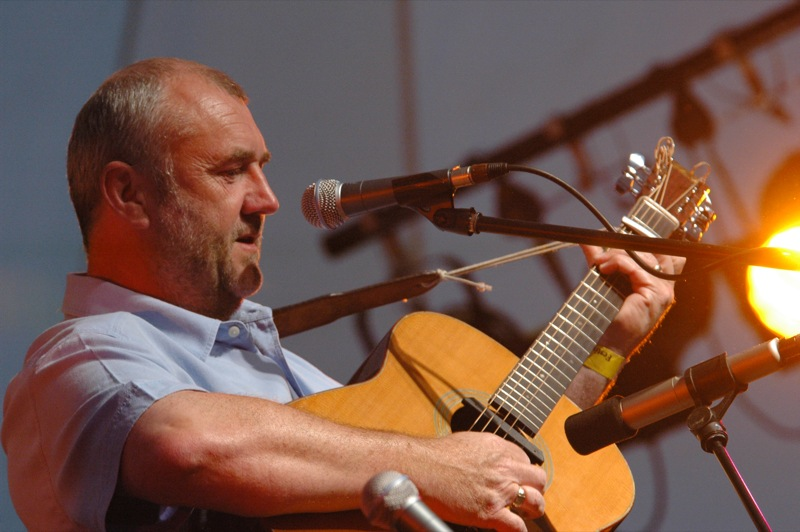

Background information
- Origin: Seaham, County Durham, England
- Genre: Folk
- Occupations: Singer, guitarist
- Instruments: Guitar, bouzouki, appalachian dulcimer, piano
- Years active: 1972–present
- Website: www.bobfoxmusic.com

Bob Fox is a British folk singer whose work is influenced by the working-class culture and industrial history of County Durham. His career began during the folk revival of the 1960s and 1970s in England, leading to tours across the UK, Europe, the USA, Australia, and New Zealand. He initially toured in an acoustic duo with Stu Luckley, and later alongside musicians including Ralph McTell, Richard Thompson, Jethro Tull, and Fairport Convention.

In 1978, the Bob Fox & Stu Luckley album Nowt So Good’ll Pass was named Melody Maker Folk Album of the Year, and in 2000, Fox's solo album Dreams Never Leave You was selected as The Daily Telegraph’s Album of the Year. Over his career, he has received nominations in the BBC Radio 2 Folk Awards.

Fox performs both as a solo artist and in collaborative projects, including a duo with Billy Mitchell, The Pitmen Poets (with Jez Lowe, Billy Mitchell, and Benny Graham), and the BBC New Radio Ballads series. He played the role of the Songman in the National Theatre’s production of War Horse in London’s West End from 2011 to 2013, as well as in the UK, Ireland, and South Africa tour from 2013 to 2015, and the 10th Anniversary UK tour from 2017 to 2019. In 2023, he performed with Jez Lowe and Julie Matthews in a live concert of New Radio Ballads material, and joined Home Service as lead singer. His performances feature songs from War Horse, the New Radio Ballads series, and his other recordings.

== Biography ==
Fox was born in 1953 in Seaham, County Durham, England. After discovering he could sing while in school he taught himself guitar and started singing in folk clubs while at the same time training to be a teacher in Durham, where he qualified in 1973. He commenced his singing career as a resident at the "Davy Lamp" Folk Club in Washington, Tyne and Wear in approx. 1970 and in 1975, teamed up to form a professional duo with fellow north-eastern singer (and fiddle player) Tom McConville for 2 years (1975–77). After this he formed a duo with ex-Hedgehog Pie singer, guitarist and acoustic bass guitar player Stu Luckley which performed all over the United Kingdom and recorded two albums, the first of which Nowt So Good'll Pass was voted Folk Album of the Year by Melody Maker in 1978. Fox and Luckley became a popular attraction on the UK folk scene and supported Richard and Linda Thompson and Ralph McTell on major British tours. After ceasing the partnership with Luckley in 1982 to pursue individual projects, Fox has maintained a successful career as a solo folk performer for over 30 years. During the 1990s, together with Benny Graham he developed a multi-media show documenting the coal mining communities of Durham and Northumberland, which led to the CD "How Are You Off For Coals", featuring a selection of mining songs. In 2006 Fox, along with a range of other top UK folk artists, was involved in providing performances for the "2006 Radio Ballads" commissioned by BBC Radio, and in 2009 he performed in the part of "Songman" in the highly acclaimed West End production of War Horse which played in the West End for 18 months and was subsequently toured for another eighteen months around Britain, Ireland and South Africa. Scholar Anthony Ashbolt describes Fox as "possessing one of the best folk-singing voices in England and he evokes the world of the miners and, in general, the songs of the northeast, with power and clarity."

== Discography ==
=== Bob Fox and Stu Luckley ===
- Nowt So Good'll Pass Rubber RUB 028 1978 album details
- Wish We Never Had Parted Black Crow CRO 204 1982 album details
- Box Of Gold Fellside FECD124 1997 album details
- Thirty Years On Bob Fox Music BFMCD010 2008 album details

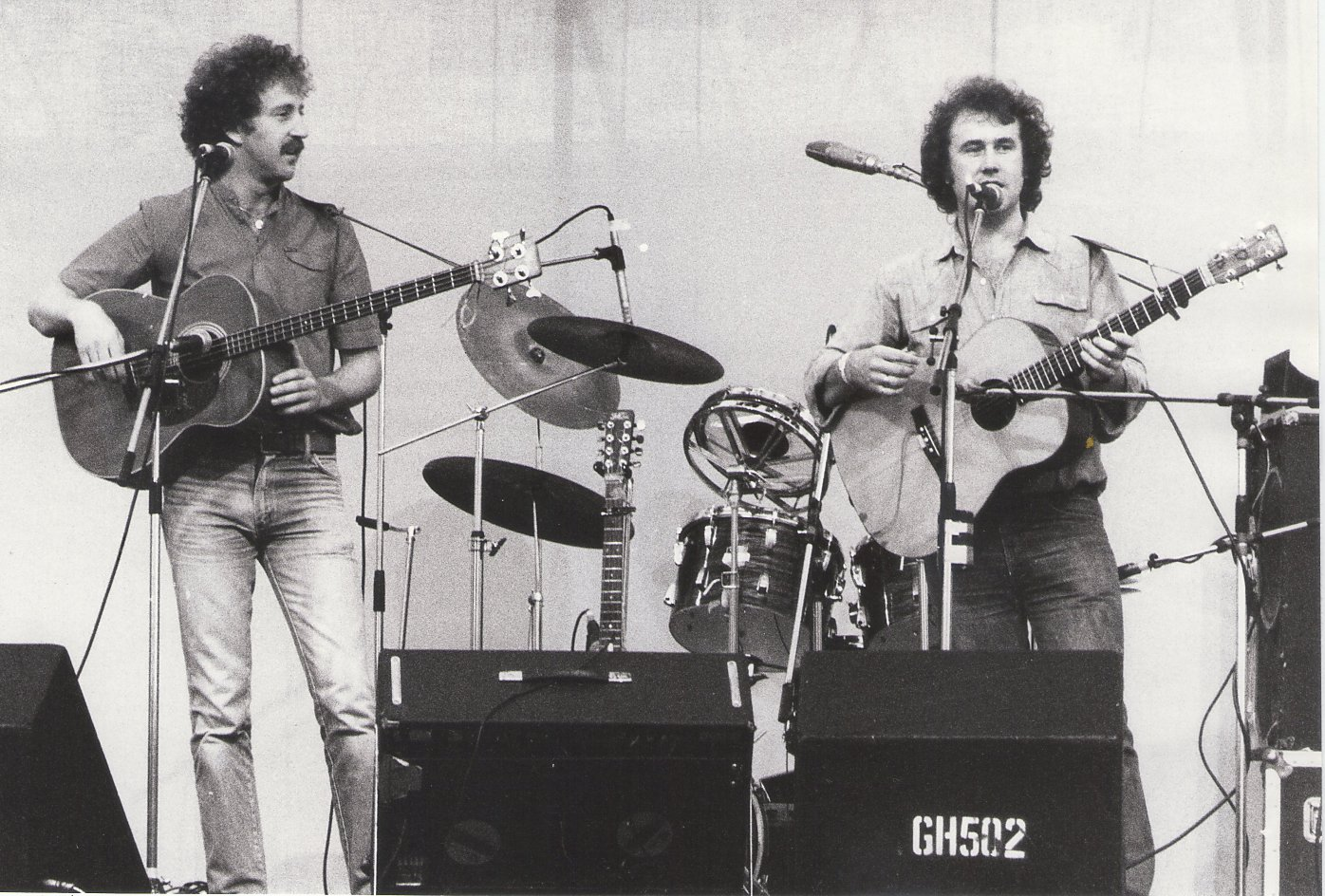
Fox (on right) with Stu Luckley in 1982

=== Bob Fox and Benny Graham ===
- How Are You Off For Coals? Fellside FECD111 1996 album details

=== Solo ===
- Dreams Never Leave You Woodworm WRCD035 2000 album details
- Borrowed Moments Topic TSCD544 2003 album details
- The Blast Topic TSCD555 2006 album details
- The Song Man Bob Fox Music BFMCD011 201?

=== The Hush (Jed Grimes, Garry Linsley, Graham Wood, Paul Smith and Neil Harland) with Bob Fox ===
- Dark to the Sky MWMCD SP54 2002 album details

=== Various Artists: The 2006 Radio Ballads ===
Bob Fox features on albums including The Song of Steel, The Enemy That Lives Within, The Horn of the Hunter, Swings and Roundabouts, Thirty Years of Conflict and The Ballad of the Big Ships, also on the compilation album The Songs of the Radio Ballads.

=== Billy Mitchell and Bob Fox ===
- Five Star B&B B&B B&BCD01 2007 album details
- Back on City Road B&B B&BCD02 2009 album details

=== The Pitmen Poets (Benny Graham, Billy Mitchell, Bob Fox, Jez Lowe) ===
- The Pitmen Poets (label?) PPCD01 2015 album details
- More Black Diamonds PPCD02 2016
- Seamless PPCD03 2019
- Bare Knuckle 2022
- Re-Union PPCD04 2024
