= Tony Capstick =

English actor (1944–2003)

- Born: Joseph Antony Capstick; 27 July 1944; Rotherham, West Riding of Yorkshire England
- Died: 23 October 2003 (aged 59); Hoober, Wentworth, South Yorkshire, England
- Years active: 1972–2003

Joseph Antony Capstick (27 July 1944 – 23 October 2003) was an English comedian, actor, musician and broadcaster.

== Life and career ==
First son of Joe Capstick, a wireless operator in the RAF, and his wife, June, née Duncan, he was born in Rotherham, West Riding of Yorkshire, England, and spent most of his childhood in Swinton, near Mexborough. For over thirty years he was a presenter on BBC Radio Sheffield. In the 1970s he presented Folkweave for BBC Radio 2 and continued to work for that station sporadically until the early 1990s. Outside Sheffield, he is perhaps better known as one of the policemen in the long-running British sitcom, Last of the Summer Wine, where he played the role until his death in October 2003, with his final appearance on the show broadcast in April 2004.

== Biography ==
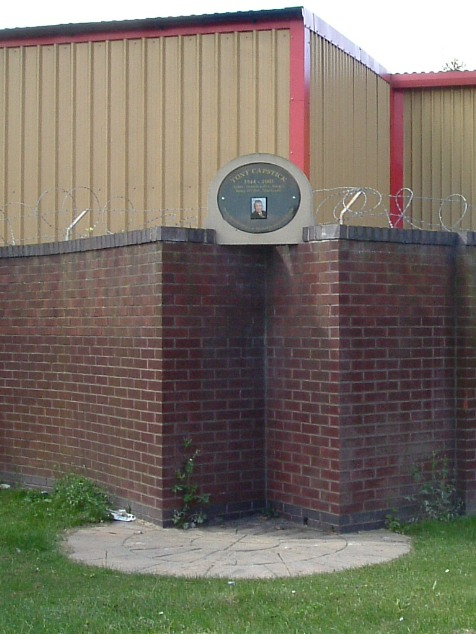
Memorial to Tony Capstick in Swinton

A regular performer on the folk circuit, he recorded many albums. The first was for the Newcastle based record label Rubber Records (His Round with Hedgehog Pie, Punch and Judy Man, Tony Capstick Does a Turn, Songs of Ewan MacColl with Dick Gaughan and Dave Burland and There Was This Bloke with Mike Harding, Derek Brimstone and Bill Barclay). In 1981, he unexpectedly reached No. 3 in the UK Singles Chart with "The Sheffield Grinder" / "Capstick Comes Home". It was recorded with the Carlton Main Frickley Colliery Band. His recitation, "Capstick Comes Home", was based on the well-known Hovis wholemeal bread television commercials directed by Ridley Scott. "Capstick Comes Home" also peaked at number 92 in Australia in July 1981.

As a comedian, he had an eight-part television series, Capstick's Capers, on Channel 4 in 1983. Capstick was also a prolific bit-part actor, with a career including minor roles in the soap operas Emmerdale and Coronation Street. In the latter he played the recurring character of the brewer Harvey Nuttall.

His career at Radio Sheffield came to an end in January 2003. He continued to write a regular column in a local weekly newspaper, the Rotherham Advertiser.

Capstick was an author, with Paul Donoghue, of a book on the Appleby Horse Fair.

== Death ==
On 23 October 2003, Capstick was found dead at his cottage in Hoober, near Wentworth, South Yorkshire, he had suffered an aneurysm following a bout of pneumonia. He was survived by wife Gillian and his two children from his first marriage.

== Discography ==
- His Round (with Hedgehog Pie), 1971
- Punch and Judy Man (with Hedgehog Pie), 1974
- Does a Turn, 1978
- Songs of Ewan MacColl (with Dick Gaughan and Dave Burland), 1978
- "Capstick Comes Home" / "The Sheffield Grinder, No. 3 UK Singles Chart, 1981

== Filmography ==
=== Film ===
Year	Title	Role	Notes
1989	Resurrected	Photographer	

=== Television ===
Year	Title	Role	Notes
1984	Punters	Man in Bookie's	TV movie
1985–1989	All Creatures Great & Small	Fred Allan / Clem Hudson	2 episodes
1986	Screen Two	Fireman	Episode: "Song of Experience"
1987	Truckers	Garry Brown	Episode: "Hired Guns"
1987–2004	Last of the Summer Wine	2nd PC / Policeman	33 episodes
1988–1999	Coronation Street	Harvey Nuttall / Gas Board Official / Reg	6 episodes
1989	Stay Lucky	Taxi Driver	Episode: "A1 Rain Dancer"
1993–1995	Heartbeat	Alfie Alker / Harold	2 episodes
1994	Earthfasts	Stranger at Inquest	Episode: "Episode #1.4"
1994	Common as Muck	Mr. Adlard	Episode: "Keeping the Refuse Tender"
1995	Band of Gold	Councillor Baker	3 episodes
1995	Out of the Blue	Des	Episode: "Survivor"
1998	City Central	Delivery Man	Episode: "Throwing It All Away"
1998–1999	The Cops	Malcolm Rowley / Chip Shop Owner	2 episodes
