= Whippersnapper (band) =

- Genres: English folk music
- Instruments: Fiddles, guitar, vocals, bouzouki, mandolin, flute
- Years active: 1984–1993, 2008–2009
- Label: WPS
- Past members: Dave Swarbrick; Chris Leslie; Kevin Dempsey; Martin Jenkins

Whippersnapper was an English folk band formed in 1984, consisting of Dave Swarbrick (fiddle, mandolin, vocals), Chris Leslie (fiddle, mandolin, vocals), Kevin Dempsey (guitar, vocals) and Martin Jenkins (mando-cello, flute, vocals).

Swarbrick left the group in 1989, and the band continued as a trio until 1993, with the only album recorded that line-up being Stories. During that time, Dempsey and Leslie released an album called Always With You as a duo. The band split when Jenkins left the group in 1993. However, they did tour briefly again in 1994.

Following Swarbrick's recovery from illness, Whippersnapper toured again as a full four piece in both 2008 and 2009.

Martin Jenkins (born 17 July 1946, London, England) died on 17 May 2011, in Sofia, Bulgaria, from a heart attack.

They are not to be confused with the Australian indie rock group, The Whipper Snappers, who coincidentally played during the period 1988 to 1993.

== Discography ==
- Promises (1985)
- Tsubo (1987)
- These Foolish Strings (1988)
- Fortune (1990)
- Stories (1991)
