= T. gardneri =

T. gardneri may refer to:

- Thomasia gardneri, the Mount Holland Thomasia, a plant species in the genus Thomasia
- Tillandsia gardneri, a plant species native to Brazil and Venezuela

== See also ==
- Gardneri
