= Thomasia glabripetala =

Conservation status
- Declared rare (DEC)

Scientific classification
- Kingdom: Plantae
- Clade: Tracheophytes
- Clade: Angiosperms
- Clade: Eudicots
- Clade: Rosids
- Order: Malvales
- Family: Malvaceae
- Genus: Thomasia
- Species: T. glabripetala

Binomial name
- Thomasia glabripetala S.J.Patrick

Species of shrub

Thomasia glabripetala is a species of flowering plant in the family Malvaceae and is endemic to a restricted area of the south-west of Western Australia. It is an open shrub with densely hairy branchlets, sparsely hairy, wrinkled, elliptic or oblong leaves, and racemes of purplish-pink flowers arranged in leaf axils.

== Description ==
Thomasia glabripetala is an open shrub that typically grows up to 1.2 m (3 ft 11 in) high, 1 m (3 ft 3 in) wide and has its branchlets densely covered with brownish, star-shaped hairs. The leaves are elliptic or oblong, 15–35 mm (0.59–1.38 in) long and 7–18 mm (0.28–0.71 in) wide, on a petiole 4–10 mm (0.16–0.39 in) long with leaf-like, kidney-shaped or lobed stipules 6–16 mm (0.24–0.63 in) long at the base. The leaves are slightly wrinkled, both surfaces covered with star-shaped hairs, pale on the upper surface and rusty brown on the lower surface. The flowers are arranged in racemes of 4 to 7 in leaf axils on a hairy peduncle, each flower on a pedicel 4–9 mm (0.16–0.35 in) long, with 3 hairy, elliptic bracteoles 6–16 mm (0.24–0.63 in) long at the base. The sepals are purplish-pink, 9–17 mm (0.35–0.67 in) long with 5 lobes 4–8 mm (0.16–0.31 in) long. Flowering occurs in September and October and the fruit is a capsule about 4 mm (0.16 in) long.

== Taxonomy and naming ==
Thomasia glabripetala was first formally described in 1993 by Susan Paust in the journal Nuytsia, from specimens she collected near York in 1991. The specific epithet (glabripetala) means "smooth petals", referring to features that distinguish this species from T. montana.

== Distribution and habitat ==
This thomasia grows in the open shrub layer of remnant woodland east of York in the Avon Wheatbelt bioregion of south-western Western Australia.

== Conservation status ==
Thomasia glabripetala is listed as "Threatened" by the Western Australian Government Department of Biodiversity, Conservation and Attractions, meaning that it is in danger of extinction.
