= Thomasia × formosa =

Conservation status
- Priority One — Poorly Known Taxa (DEC)

Scientific classification
- Kingdom: Plantae
- Clade: Tracheophytes
- Clade: Angiosperms
- Clade: Eudicots
- Clade: Rosids
- Order: Malvales
- Family: Malvaceae
- Genus: Thomasia
- Species: T. × formosa

Binomial name
- Thomasia × formosa Paust

Species of shrub

Thomasia × formosa is a species of flowering plant in the family Malvaceae and is endemic to a restricted area of the south-west of Western Australia. It is an erect, compact shrub with densely hairy branchlets, hairy, coarsely serrated, egg-shaped to elliptic or oblong leaves, and racemes of pink or purple flowers arranged in leaf axils.

== Description ==
Thomasia × formosa is an erect, compact shrub that typically grows to 0.5–0.7 m (1 ft 8 in – 2 ft 4 in) high, 0.5–1 m (1 ft 8 in – 3 ft 3 in) wide and has its branchlets densely covered with rust-coloured, star-shaped hairs. The leaves are egg-shaped to elliptic or oblong, 20–40 mm (0.79–1.57 in) long and 4–10 mm (0.16–0.39 in) wide, tapering to a petiole 3–5 mm (0.12–0.20 in) long with oval stipules 4–7 mm (0.16–0.28 in) long at the base. The upper surface of the leaves is wrinkled, the edges have rounded teeth and down-curved edges, and both surfaces are covered with rust-coloured, star-shaped hairs. The flowers are arranged in racemes of 7 or more in leaf axils on a peduncle 30–40 mm (1.2–1.6 in) long, each flower on a pedicel up to 10 mm (0.39 in) long, with egg-shaped bracts and 3 bracteoles about 7 mm (0.28 in) long at the base. The sepals are pink or purple with lobes 10 mm (0.39 in) long. Flowering occurs in September and October.

== Taxonomy and naming ==
Thomasia × formosa was first formally described in 1974 by Susan Paust in the journal Nuytsia, from specimens collected by Charles Chapman near Three Springs in 1972. The specific epithet (formosa) means "handsome".

This species is an inter-generic hybrid between Thomasia macrocalyx and Lysiosepalum rugosum.

== Distribution and habitat ==
This thomasia grows in mallee woodland, shrubland and heath in a restricted area near Three Springs in the Avon Wheatbelt and Geraldton Sandplains bioregions of south-western Western Australia.

== Conservation status ==
Thomasia × formosa is listed as "Threatened" by the Western Australian Government Department of Biodiversity, Conservation and Attractions, meaning that it is in danger of extinction.
