= T. grandiflora =

T. grandiflora may refer to:

- Tellima grandiflora, the fringecup or bigflower tellima, a herbaceous perennial plant species native of most forests in western North America
- Thespesia grandiflora, the flor de Maga, a tree species and the official national flower of Puerto Rico
- Thomasia grandiflora, the large-flowered thomasia, a small shrub species endemic to the southwest of Western Australia
- Tibouchina grandiflora, a synonym of the flowering plant species Pleroma heteromallum

== See also ==
- Grandiflora (disambiguation)
