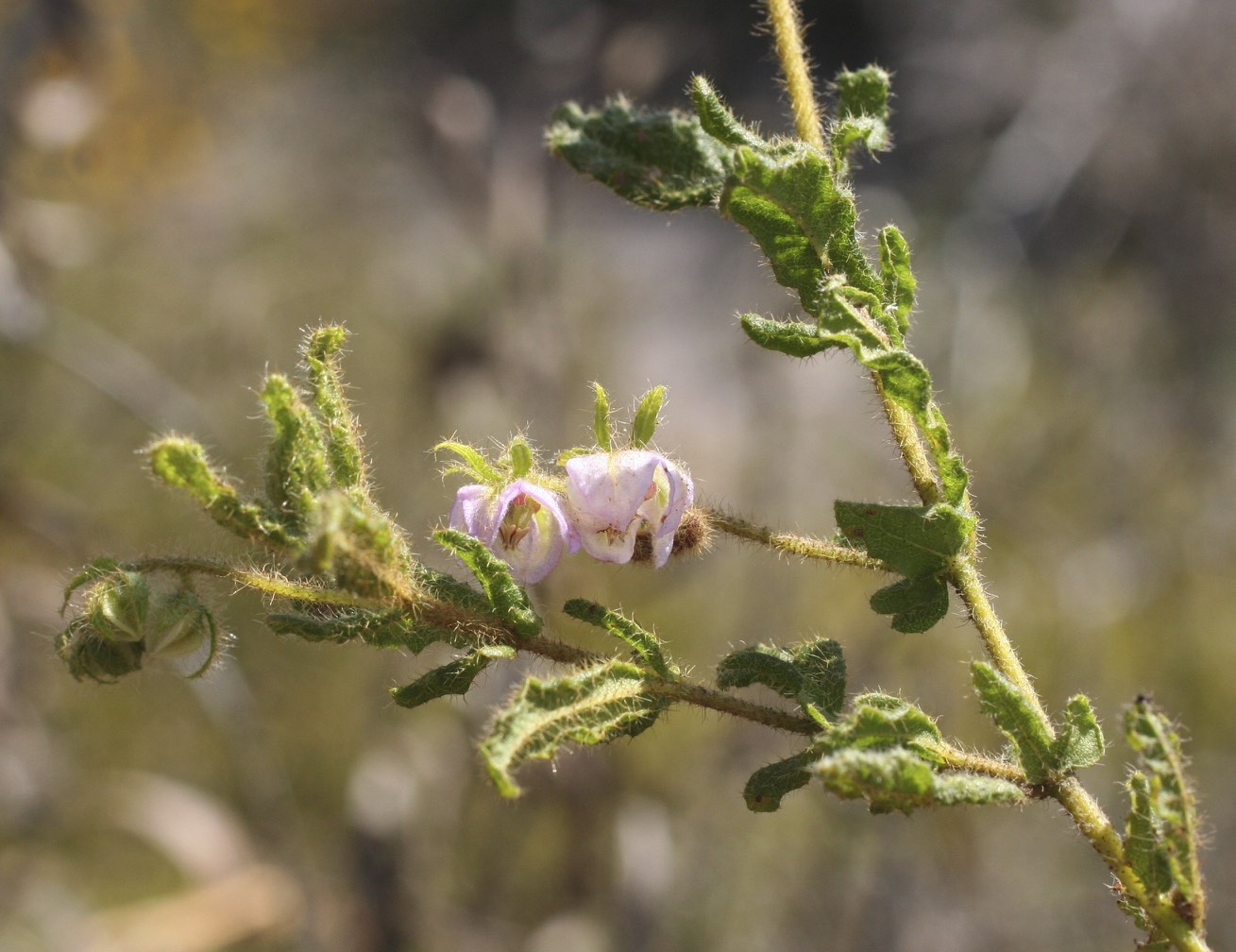
- Near Wedge Island

Scientific classification
- Kingdom: Plantae
- Clade: Tracheophytes
- Clade: Angiosperms
- Clade: Eudicots
- Clade: Rosids
- Order: Malvales
- Family: Malvaceae
- Genus: Thomasia
- Species: T. cognata

Binomial name
- Thomasia cognata Steud.

= Thomasia cognata =

Species of shrub

Thomasia cognata is a species of flowering plant in the family Malvaceae and is endemic to the south-west of Western Australia. It is a compact, multi-stemmed shrub with wrinkled, narrowly oblong to elliptic leaves and pale pink flowers.

== Description ==
Thomasia cognata is a compact, multi-stemmed shrub that typically grows to 0.1–0.7 m (3.9 in – 2 ft 3.6 in) high, 0.5–1 m (1 ft 8 in – 3 ft 3 in) wide and has its stems covered in scattered, star-shaped hairs. The leaves are narrowly oblong to elliptic, 10–40 mm (0.39–1.57 in) long and 3–10 mm (0.12–0.39 in) wide on a petiole 2–3 mm (0.079–0.118 in) long. The edges of the leaves are wavy, the surfaces covered with a few star-shaped hairs. There are leaf-like stipules 6–8 mm (0.24–0.31 in) long at the base of the petioles, but that are shed early. The flowers are arranged in racemes of 2 to 8 up to 80 mm (3.1 in) long, each flower on a pedicel 3–4 mm (0.12–0.16 in) long, with bracteoles 4–6 mm (0.16–0.24 in) long at the base. The sepals are pale pink to purple, 7–8 mm (0.28–0.31 in) long, the petals about 1 mm (0.039 in) long, the style no longer than the stamens.

== Taxonomy and naming ==
Thomasia cognata was first formally described in 1845 by Ernst Gottlieb von Steudel in Lehmann's Plantae Preissianae from specimens collected on Rottnest Island in 1839. The specific epithet (cognata) means "related by birth", referring to its similarity to other species.

== Distribution and habitat ==
This thomasia grows on coastal limestone and sand dunes from near the Murchison River and south to Albany, then east to the east of Esperance in the Esperance Plains, Geraldton Sandplains, Jarrah Forest, Swan Coastal Plain and Warren bioregions of south-western Western Australia.

== Conservation status ==
Thomasia cognata is classified as "not threatened" by the Western Australian Government Department of Biodiversity, Conservation and Attractions.
