= Thomasia multiflora =

Conservation status
- Priority One — Poorly Known Taxa (DEC)

Scientific classification
- Kingdom: Plantae
- Clade: Tracheophytes
- Clade: Angiosperms
- Clade: Eudicots
- Clade: Rosids
- Order: Malvales
- Family: Malvaceae
- Genus: Thomasia
- Species: T. multiflora

Binomial name
- Thomasia multiflora E.Pritz.

Species of grass

Thomasia multiflora is a species of flowering plant in the family Malvaceae and is endemic to the south-west of Western Australia. It is a low, spreading shrub with broadly egg-shaped leaves and mauve flowers.

== Description ==
Thomasia multiflora is a spreading shrub that typically grows to 0.3–1.5 m (1 ft 0 in – 4 ft 11 in) high and 0.5–1.5 m (1 ft 8 in – 4 ft 11 in) wide, its new growth densely covered with star-shaped hairs. The leaves are broadly egg-shaped, 15–30 mm (0.59–1.18 in) long and 6–8 mm (0.24–0.31 in) wide on a petiole 8–10 mm (0.31–0.39 in) long with wing-like stipules at the base of the petioles. The flowers are 12–18 mm (0.47–0.71 in) in diameter and arranged in racemes of 6 to 12 on a hairy peduncle 60–70 mm (2.4–2.8 in) long. Each flower is on a short pedicel with hairy, linear bracteoles at the base. The sepals are mauve, joined for about half their length, and there are no petals.

== Taxonomy and naming ==
Thomasia multiflora was first formally described in 1904 by Ernst Georg Pritzel in Botanische Jahrbücher für Systematik, Pflanzengeschichte und Pflanzengeographie from specimens collected near King George Sound. The specific epithet (multiflora) means "many-flowered".

== Distribution and habitat ==
This thomasia grows in shrubland and woodland in winter-wet areas and on granite outcrops from near Walpole to Albany in the Esperance Plains bioregion of south-western Western Australia.

== Conservation status ==
Thomasia multiflora is classified as "Priority One" by the Government of Western Australia Department of Biodiversity, Conservation and Attractions, meaning that it is known from only one or a few locations which are potentially at risk.
