= Thomasia triloba =

Conservation status
- Priority One — Poorly Known Taxa (DEC)

Scientific classification
- Kingdom: Plantae
- Clade: Tracheophytes
- Clade: Angiosperms
- Clade: Eudicots
- Clade: Rosids
- Order: Malvales
- Family: Malvaceae
- Genus: Thomasia
- Species: T. triloba

Binomial name
- Thomasia triloba Turcz.

Species of shrub

Thomasia triloba is a species of flowering plant in the family Malvaceae and is endemic to the south-west of Western Australia. It is an erect, open shrub that typically grows to a height of 0.4–1 m (1 ft 4 in – 3 ft 3 in) and has pink or purple flowers in October and November. The species was first formally described in 1846 by Nikolai Turczaninow in the Bulletin de la Société Impériale des Naturalistes de Moscou from specimens collected by James Drummond. This species of thomasia is listed as "Priority One" by the Government of Western Australia Department of Biodiversity, Conservation and Attractions, meaning that it is known from only one or a few locations which are potentially at risk, but may be extinct.
