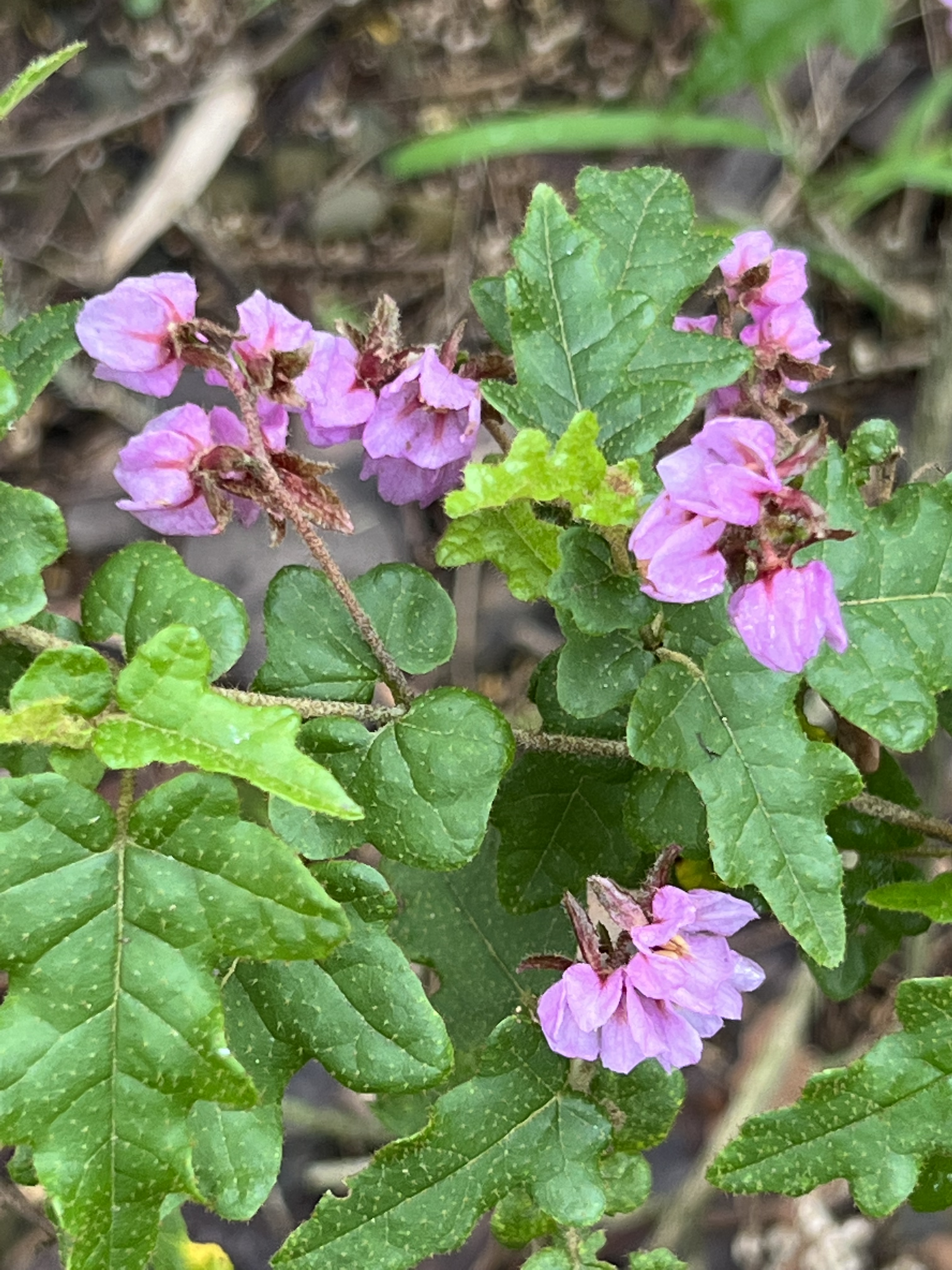

Conservation status
- Priority Two — Poorly Known Taxa (DEC)

Scientific classification
- Kingdom: Plantae
- Clade: Tracheophytes
- Clade: Angiosperms
- Clade: Eudicots
- Clade: Rosids
- Order: Malvales
- Family: Malvaceae
- Genus: Thomasia
- Species: T. brachystachys

Binomial name
- Thomasia brachystachys Turcz.

= Thomasia brachystachys =

Species of shrub

Thomasia brachystachys is a species of flowering plant in the family Malvaceae and is endemic to the Southwest Australia south-west of Western Australia. It is an open, erect shrub with egg-shaped to heart-shaped leaves and pink to mauve flowers.

== Description ==
Thomasia brachystachys is an open, erect shrub that typically grows to a height of up to 1.5 m (4 ft 11 in) and has a single stem at ground level, its stems densely covered with star-shaped hairs. The leaves are arranged alternately, egg-shaped to heart-shaped, 35–80 mm (1.4–3.1 in) long and 25–65 mm (0.98–2.56 in) wide on a petiole 12–20 mm (0.47–0.79 in) long. The edges of the leaves are lobed, the lower surface covered with star-shaped hairs and the upper surface becoming glabrous with age. There are oval, stem-clasping, densely hairy stipules up to 7 mm (0.28 in) long at the base of the petioles. The flowers are arranged in racemes of 5 to 8, about the same length as the leaves, each flower on a short pedicel, and about 10 mm (0.39 in) in diameter. The sepals are pink to mauve, joined for about half their length and there are bracts and broadly elliptic bracteoles at the base. The petals are small and scale-like, the five stamens free from each other, and the style no longer than the petals. The fruit is a dehiscent capsule.

== Taxonomy and naming ==
Thomasia brachystachys was first formally described in 1852 by Nikolai Turczaninow and the description was published in Bulletin de la Société Impériale des Naturalistes de Moscou. The specific epithet (brachystachys) means "a short flower spike".

== Distribution and habitat ==
This thomasia grows in woodland and forest at higher altitudes in the Stirling Range National Park and near Gnowangerup.

== Conservation status ==
Thomasia brachystachys is classified as "Priority Two" by the Western Australian Government Department of Biodiversity, Conservation and Attractions, meaning that it is poorly known and from only one or a few locations.

== Use in horticulture ==
This thomasia is described as an attractive species that has proved reliable in a range of conditions when grown in well-drained, humus-rich soil. It can be propagated from both seed and cuttings and is moderately drought and frost hardy.
