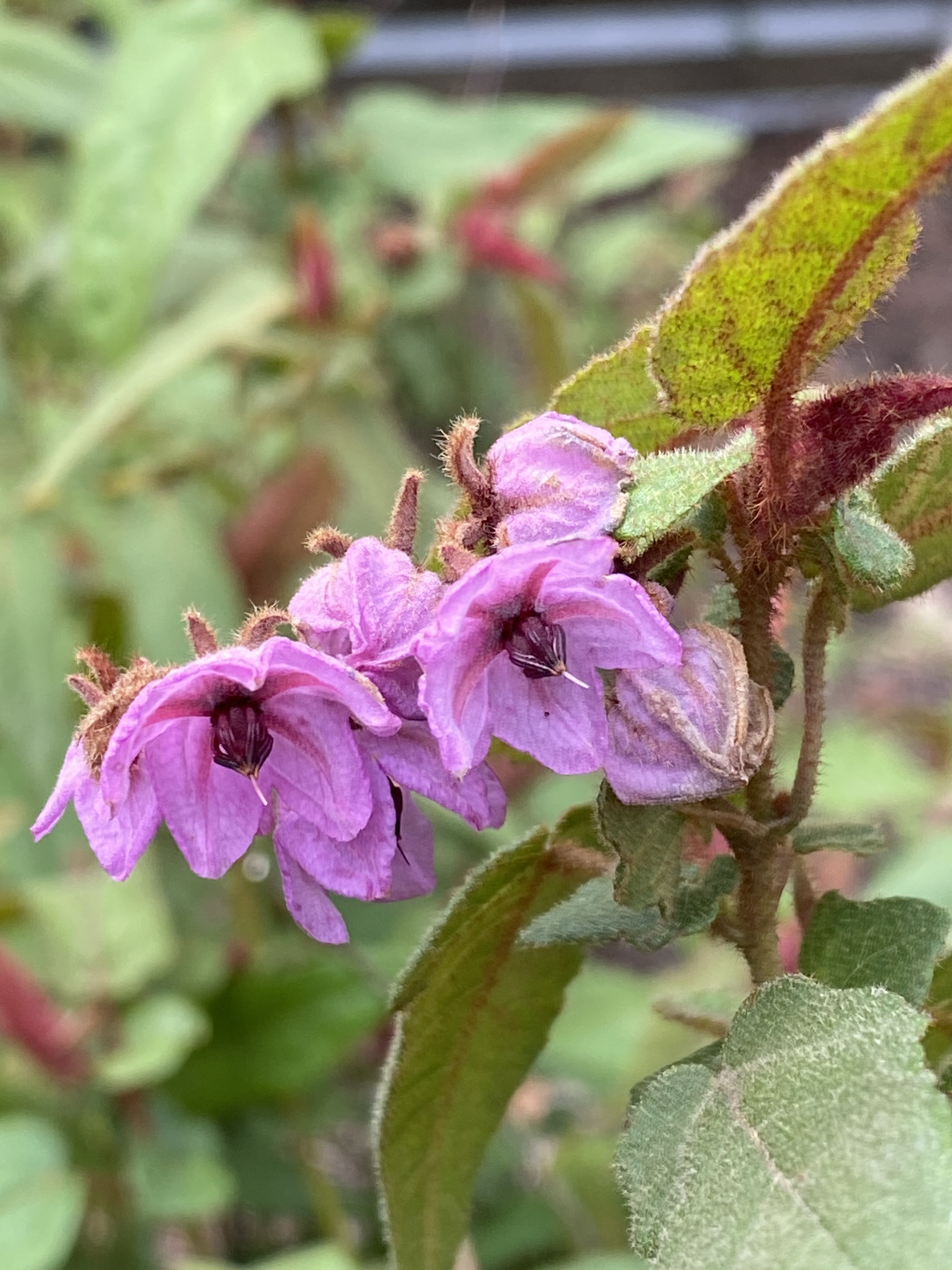

Scientific classification
- Kingdom: Plantae
- Clade: Tracheophytes
- Clade: Angiosperms
- Clade: Eudicots
- Clade: Rosids
- Order: Malvales
- Family: Malvaceae
- Genus: Thomasia
- Species: T. paniculata

Binomial name
- Thomasia paniculata Lindl.

= Thomasia paniculata =

Species of shrub

Thomasia paniculata is a species of flowering plant in the family Malvaceae and is endemic to the south-west of Western Australia. It is a spreading shrub with heart-shaped to narrowly egg-shaped leaves and pinkish-mauve flowers.

== Description ==
Thomasia paniculata is a spreading shrub that typically grows to 0.3–2 m (1 ft 0 in – 6 ft 7 in) high and 1.0–1.5 m (3 ft 3 in – 4 ft 11 in) wide, its new growth densely covered with star-shaped hairs. The leaves are heart-shaped to narrowly egg-shaped, 30–100 mm (1.2–3.9 in) long and 8–20 mm (0.31–0.79 in) wide on a petiole 8–13 mm (0.31–0.51 in) long with rounded to wing-like stipules at the base of the petioles. The edges of the leaves are regularly notched and both sides are covered with scattered star-shaped hairs. The flowers are up to 13 mm (0.51 in) in diameter and arranged in racemes of 3 to 8 on a peduncle up to 80 mm (3.1 in) long. Each flower is on a pedicel 3–5 mm (0.12–0.20 in) long with densely hairy, linear bracts and similar bracteoles 4–8 mm (0.16–0.31 in) long at the base. The sepals are pinkish-mauve, densely covered with star-shaped hairs and joined for about half their length. Flowering occurs from September to December or from January to March.

== Taxonomy ==
Thomasia paniculata was first formally described in 1839 by John Lindley in A Sketch of the Vegetation of the Swan River Colony. The specific epithet (paniculata) refers to the branching habit of some of the flowering racemes.

== Distribution and habitat ==
This thomasia usually grows as an understorey plant in moist places in karri, jarrah and tingle forest, mainly between Perth and Albany in the Esperance Plains, Jarrah Forest, Swan Coastal Plain and Warren bioregions of south-western Western Australia.

== Conservation status ==
Thomasia paniculata is listed as "not threatened" by the Government of Western Australia Department of Biodiversity, Conservation and Attractions.
