= Thomasia dielsii =

Scientific classification
- Kingdom: Plantae
- Clade: Tracheophytes
- Clade: Angiosperms
- Clade: Eudicots
- Clade: Rosids
- Order: Malvales
- Family: Malvaceae
- Genus: Thomasia
- Species: T. dielsii

Binomial name
- Thomasia dielsii E.Pritz.

Species of shrub

Thomasia dielsii is a species of flowering plant in the family Malvaceae and is endemic to the south-west of Western Australia. It is a low, erect to spreading shrub with egg-shaped leaves with wavy edges, and purple, violet and blue flowers.

== Description ==
Thomasia dielsii is an erect to spreading shrub that typically grows to 0.2–0.4 m (7.9 in – 1 ft 3.7 in) high, 0.8–1 m (2 ft 7 in – 3 ft 3 in) wide and has its young stems covered in greyish, star-shaped. The leaves are egg-shaped to oblong, 15–25 mm (0.59–0.98 in) long and 6–7 mm (0.24–0.28 in) wide on a petiole 4–5 mm (0.16–0.20 in) long. The edges of the leaves are wavy and slightly serrated, the upper surface with a few star-shaped hairs, the lower surface more densely hairy. There are hairy, smaller leaf-like stipules at the base of the petioles. The flowers are arranged in racemes of 4 to 9, each flower on a hairy pedicel 5–7 mm (0.20–0.28 in) long, with hairy, linear bracteoles about 6 mm (0.24 in) long at the base. The sepals are purple, violet and blue, 9–10 mm (0.35–0.39 in) long, and there are no petals, the style protruding above the stamens.

== Taxonomy and naming ==
Thomasia dielsii was first formally described in 1904 by Ernst Georg Pritzel in Botanische Jahrbücher für Systematik, Pflanzengeschichte und Pflanzengeographie from specimens he collected near Cranbrook. The specific epithet (dielsii) honours Ludwig Diels.

== Distribution and habitat ==
This thomasia grows on flats from near Cranbrook to Israelite Bay in the Avon Wheatbelt, Esperance Plains and Jarrah Forest bioregions of south-western Western Australia.

== Conservation status ==
Thomasia dielsii is classified as "Priority One" by the Government of Western Australia Department of Biodiversity, Conservation and Attractions, meaning that it is known from only one or a few locations which are potentially at risk.
