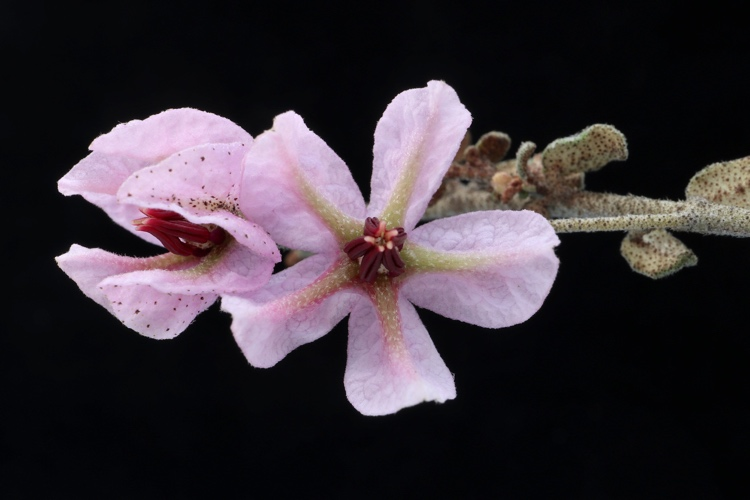

Scientific classification
- Kingdom: Plantae
- Clade: Tracheophytes
- Clade: Angiosperms
- Clade: Eudicots
- Clade: Rosids
- Order: Malvales
- Family: Malvaceae
- Genus: Thomasia
- Species: T. microphylla

Binomial name
- Thomasia microphylla Paust

= Thomasia microphylla =

Species of shrub

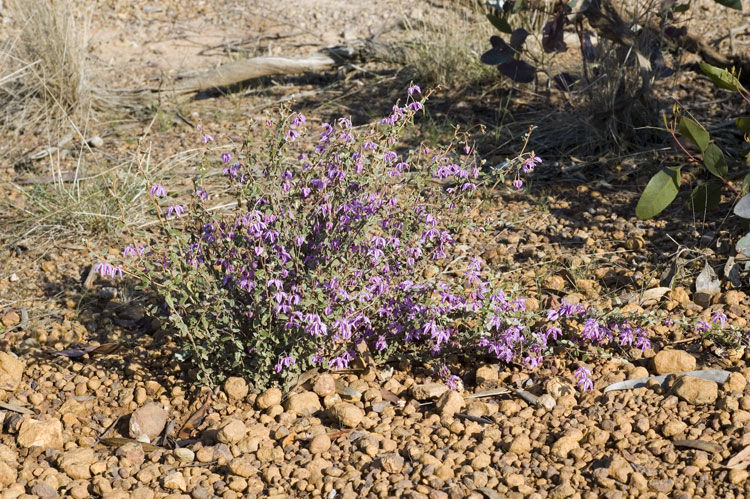
Habit near Ravensthorpe

Thomasia microphylla is a species of flowering plant in the family Malvaceae and is endemic to the south-west of Western Australia. It is an erect, spreading shrub with egg-shaped leaves and racemes of pale pink or mauve flowers.

== Description ==
Thomasia microphylla is an erect, spreading shrub that typically grows to a height of 15–60 cm (5.9–23.6 in), its young stems covered with small scales surrounded by short hairs. Its leaves are egg-shaped, 2–10 mm (0.079–0.394 in) long and 2–5 mm (0.079–0.197 in) wide on a petiole 1–2 mm (0.039–0.079 in) long. The flowers are arranged on the ends of branches in racemes of 2 to 4 on a peduncle 10–30 mm (0.39–1.18 in) long, each flower 12 mm (0.47 in) wide on a pedicel 4–5 mm (0.16–0.20 in) long. The sepals are pale pink or mauve, the petals minute. Flowering occurs from August to November.

== Taxonomy ==
Thomasia microphylla was first formally described in 1974 by Susan Paust in the journal Nuytsia from specimens collected by Alex George near the Ravensthorpe Range in 1963. The specific epithet (microphylla) means "small-leaved".

== Distribution and habitat ==
This thomasia grows in sandy coastal heath, on laterite, loam or clay in the Esperance Plains and Mallee bioregions in the south of Western Australia.

== Conservation status ==
Thomasia microphylla is listed as "not threatened" by the Government of Western Australia Department of Biodiversity, Conservation and Attractions.
