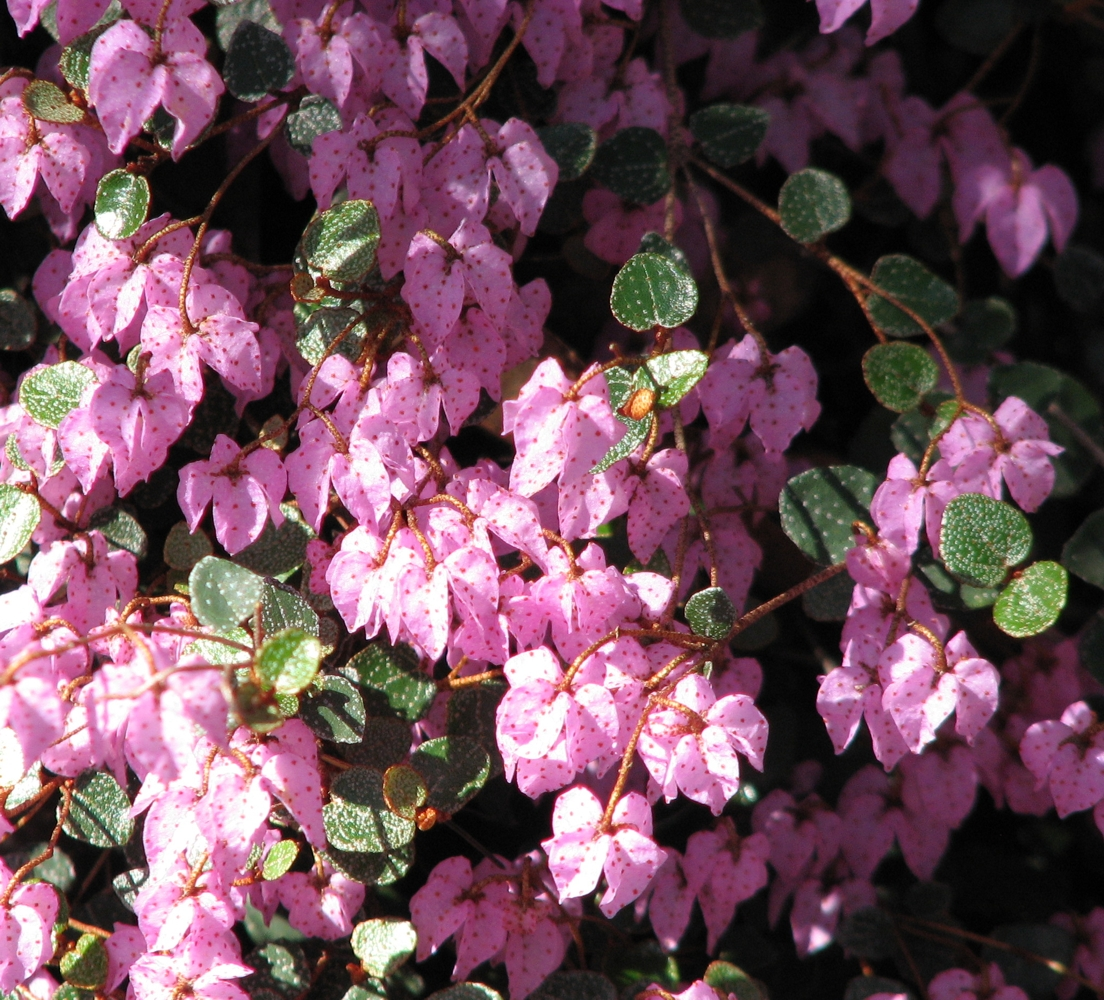
- Thomasia pygmaea

Scientific classification
- Kingdom: Plantae
- Clade: Tracheophytes
- Clade: Angiosperms
- Clade: Eudicots
- Clade: Rosids
- Order: Malvales
- Family: Malvaceae
- Subfamily: Byttnerioideae
- Tribe: Lasiopetaleae
- Genus: Thomasia; J.Gay

Species
- See text.

Synonyms
- Asterochiton Turcz.; Leucothamnus Lindl.; Rhynchostemon Steetz; Rhyncostemon Benth. orth. var.

= Thomasia =

Genus of flowering plants

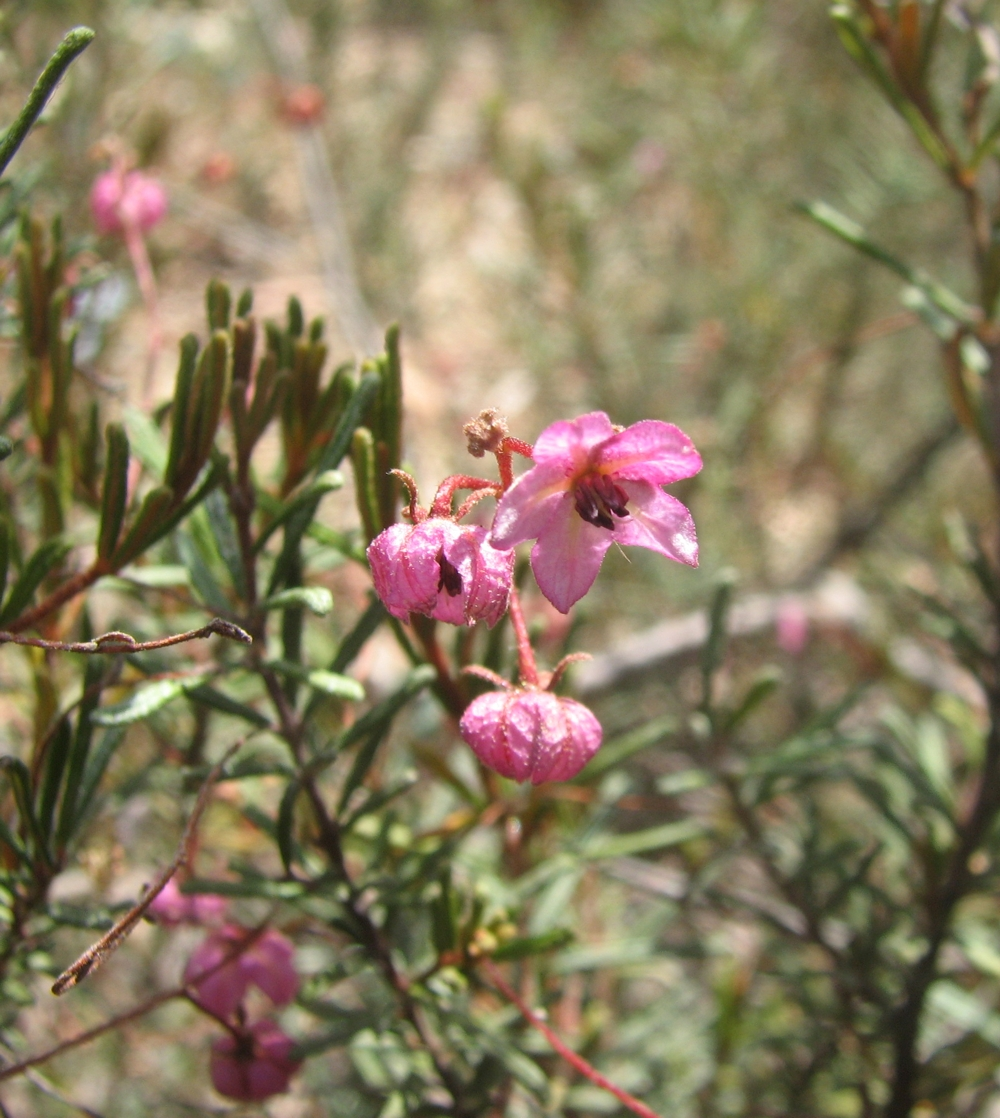
Thomasia sarotes

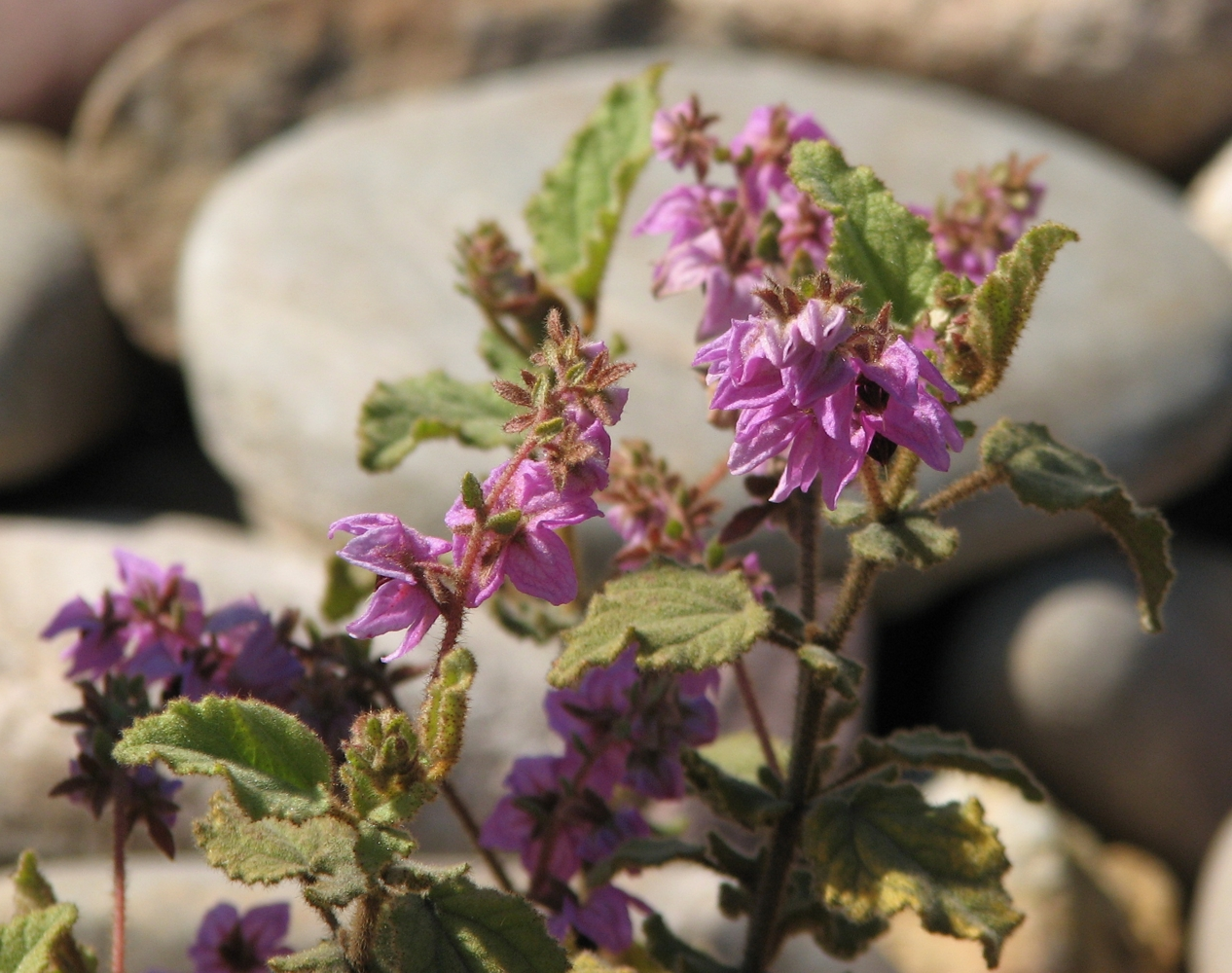
Thomasia tenuivestita

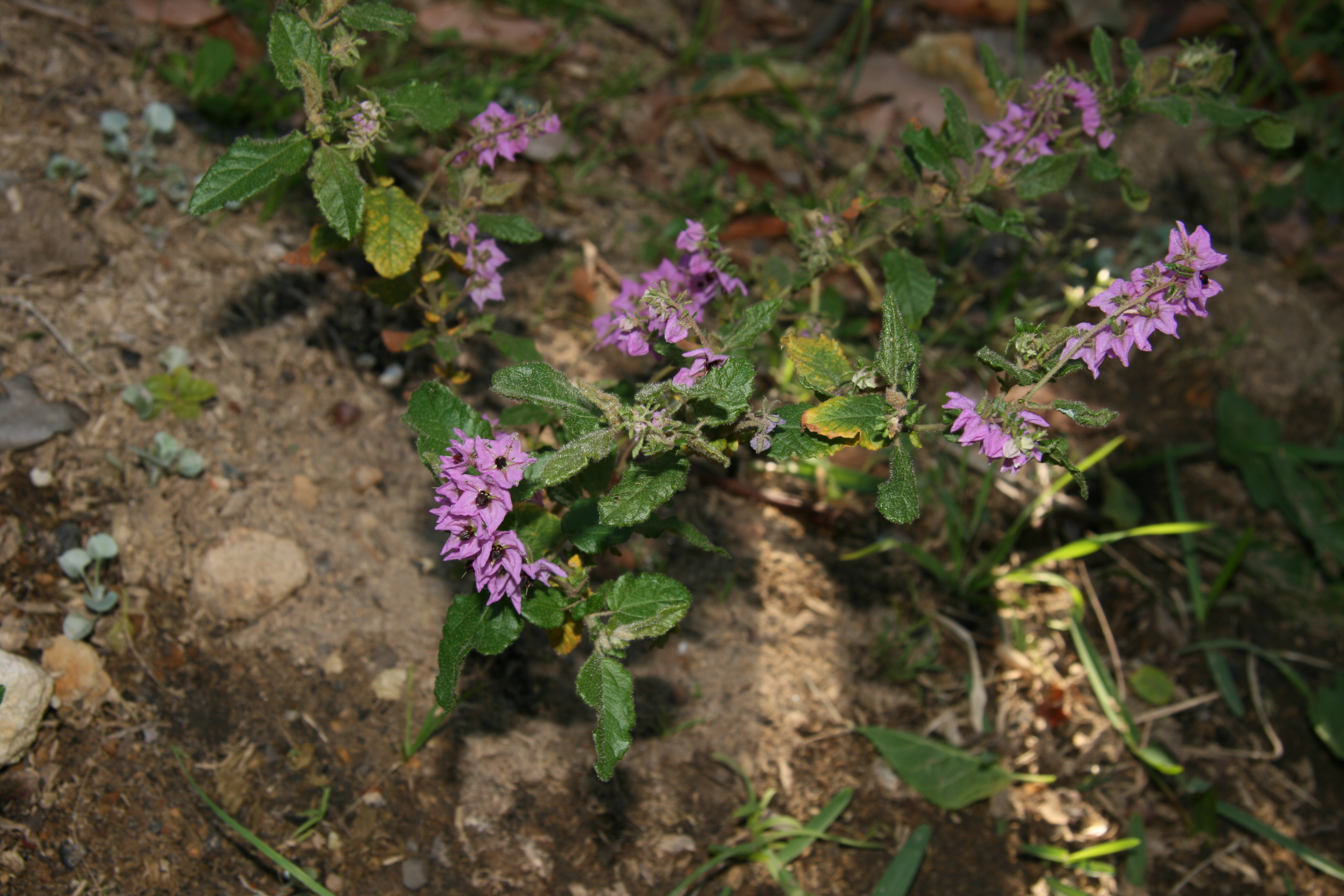
Thomasia purpurea

Thomasia is a genus of thirty-one species of flowering plants in the family Malvaceae. Plants in this genus are small shrubs that are endemic to the south-west of Western Australia, apart from T. petalocalyx that is native to Victoria and South Australia. The leaves are simple with leaf-like stipules at the base of the petiole, the flowers bisexual with five papery, petal-like sepals, usually five petals and five stamens opposite the petals. The fruit is a capsule covered with star-like hairs.

== Taxonomy ==
The genus Thomasia was first formally described in 1821 by Jaques Étienne Gay in Mémoires du Muséum d'Histoire Naturelle. The name Thomasia honours Pierre Thomas, his son Abraham, and Abraham's sons Philippe, Louis and Emmanuel, a family of Swiss plant collectors.

== Species list ==
The following is a listed of Thomasia species recognised by the Australian Plant Census as at December 2020:

- Thomasia angustifolia Steud. - narrow-leaved thomasia
- Thomasia brachystachys Turcz.
- Thomasia cognata Steud.
- Thomasia dielsii E.Pritz.
- Thomasia discolor Steud.
- Thomasia foliosa J.Gay
- Thomasia × formosa Paust
- Thomasia gardneri Paust - Mount Holland thomasia
- Thomasia glabripetala S.J.Patrick
- Thomasia grandiflora Lindl. - large-flowered thomasia
- Thomasia macrocalyx Steud.
- Thomasia macrocarpa Endl. - large-fruited thomasia
- Thomasia microphylla Paust
- Thomasia montana Steud. - hill thomasia
- Thomasia multiflora E.Pritz.
- Thomasia paniculata Lindl.
- Thomasia pauciflora Lindl. - few-flowered thomasia
- Thomasia petalocalyx F.Muell. - paper flower
- Thomasia purpurea (Dryand.) J.Gay
- Thomasia pygmaea (Turcz.) Benth. - tiny thomasia
- Thomasia quercifolia (Andrews) J.Gay - oak-leaved thomasia
- Thomasia rhynchocarpa Turcz.
- Thomasia rugosa Turcz. - wrinkled leaf thomasia
- Thomasia rulingioides Steud.
- Thomasia sarotes Turcz.
- Thomasia solanacea (Sims) J.Gay
- Thomasia stelligera (Turcz.) Benth.
- Thomasia tenuivestita F.Muell.
- Thomasia tremandroides Paust
- Thomasia triloba Turcz.
- Thomasia triphylla (Labill.) J.Gay
