= Thomasia rulingioides =

Scientific classification
- Kingdom: Plantae
- Clade: Tracheophytes
- Clade: Angiosperms
- Clade: Eudicots
- Clade: Rosids
- Order: Malvales
- Family: Malvaceae
- Genus: Thomasia
- Species: T. rulingioides

Binomial name
- Thomasia rulingioides Steud.

Species of shrub

Thomasia rulingioides is a species of flowering plant in the family Malvaceae and is endemic to the south-west of Western Australia. It is an erect, open shrub with densely hairy new growth, narrowly oblong to narrowly egg-shaped leaves with wavy edges, and pink to purple flowers.

== Description ==
Thomasia rulingioides is an erect, open shrub that typically grows to 15–65 cm (5.9–25.6 in) high and 50–80 cm (20–31 in) wide and has its young growth densely covered with star-shaped hairs. The leaves are narrowly oblong to narrowly egg-shaped, 5–30 mm (0.20–1.18 in) long and 3–10 mm (0.12–0.39 in) wide on a petiole 1–2 mm (0.039–0.079 in) long with the edges wavy and rolled under. There are stipules at the base of the petiole, but are soon shed. Both surfaces of the leaves are covered with star-shaped hairs, more densely and paler on the lower surface. The flowers are about 8 mm (0.31 in) in diameter and arranged in racemes of 2 to 5, each flower on a pedicel about 3 mm (0.12 in) long, with hairy, linear bracteoles 3–6 mm (0.12–0.24 in) long at the base. The sepals are pink to purple, joined for about half their length and the petals are tiny. Flowering occurs from May to October.

== Taxonomy and naming ==
Thomasia rulingioides was first formally described in 1845 by Ernst Gottlieb von Steudel in Lehmann's Plantae Preissianae from specimens collected in 1839. The specific epithet (rulingioides) means "Rulingia-like".

== Distribution and habitat ==
This thomasia grows in deep sand over limestone, in scattered locations, mainly near the coast between Perth and Geraldton but also near Esperance and further inland near Three Springs in the Geraldton Sandplains and Swan Coastal Plain bioregions of south-western Western Australia.

== Conservation status ==
Thomasia rulingioides is listed as "not threatened" by the Western Australian Government Department of Biodiversity, Conservation and Attractions.
