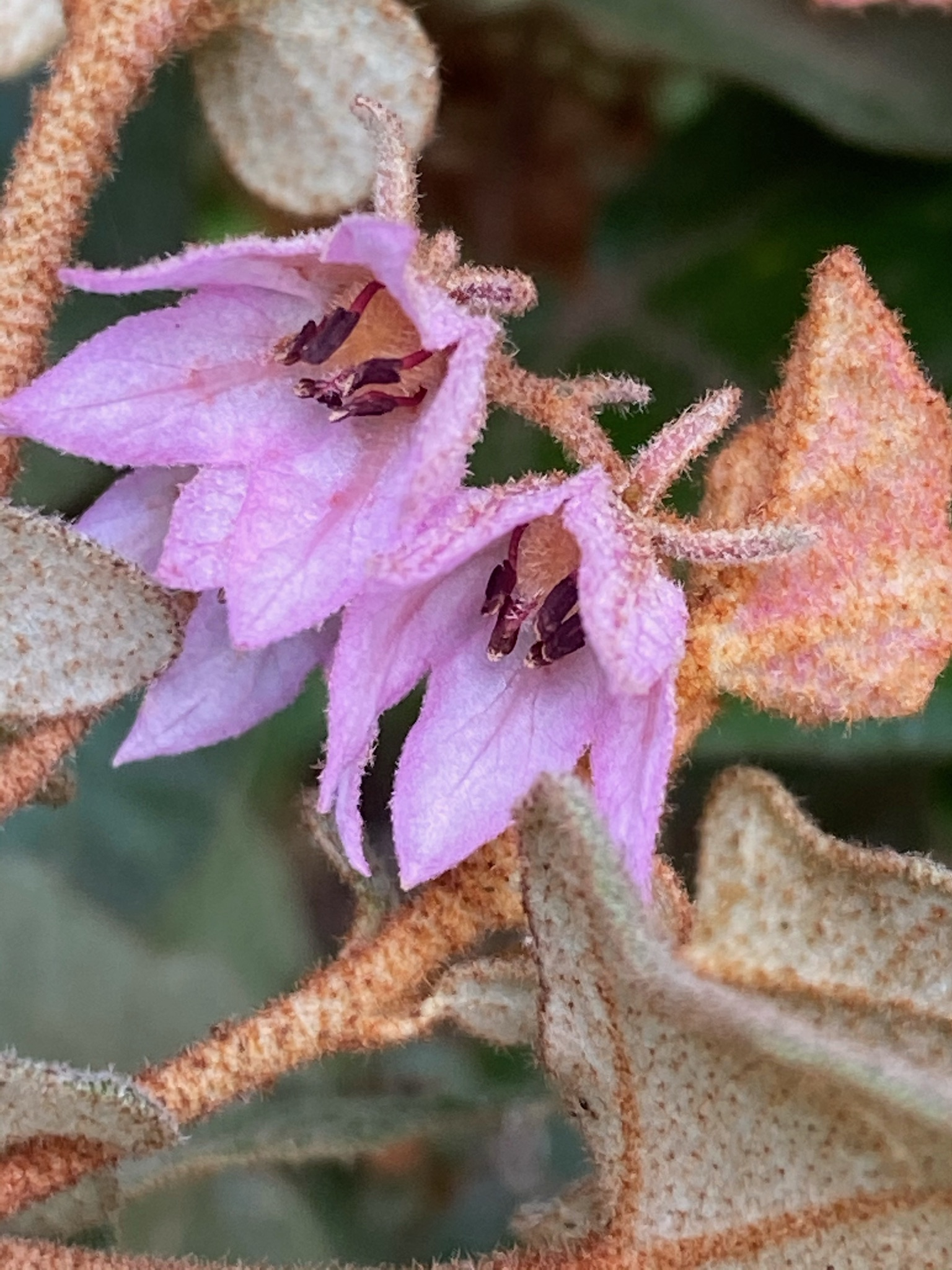

Scientific classification
- Kingdom: Plantae
- Clade: Embryophytes
- Clade: Tracheophytes
- Clade: Spermatophytes
- Clade: Angiosperms
- Clade: Eudicots
- Clade: Rosids
- Order: Malvales
- Family: Malvaceae
- Genus: Thomasia
- Species: T. triphylla

Binomial name
- Thomasia triphylla (Labill) J.Gay

= Thomasia triphylla =

Species of shrub

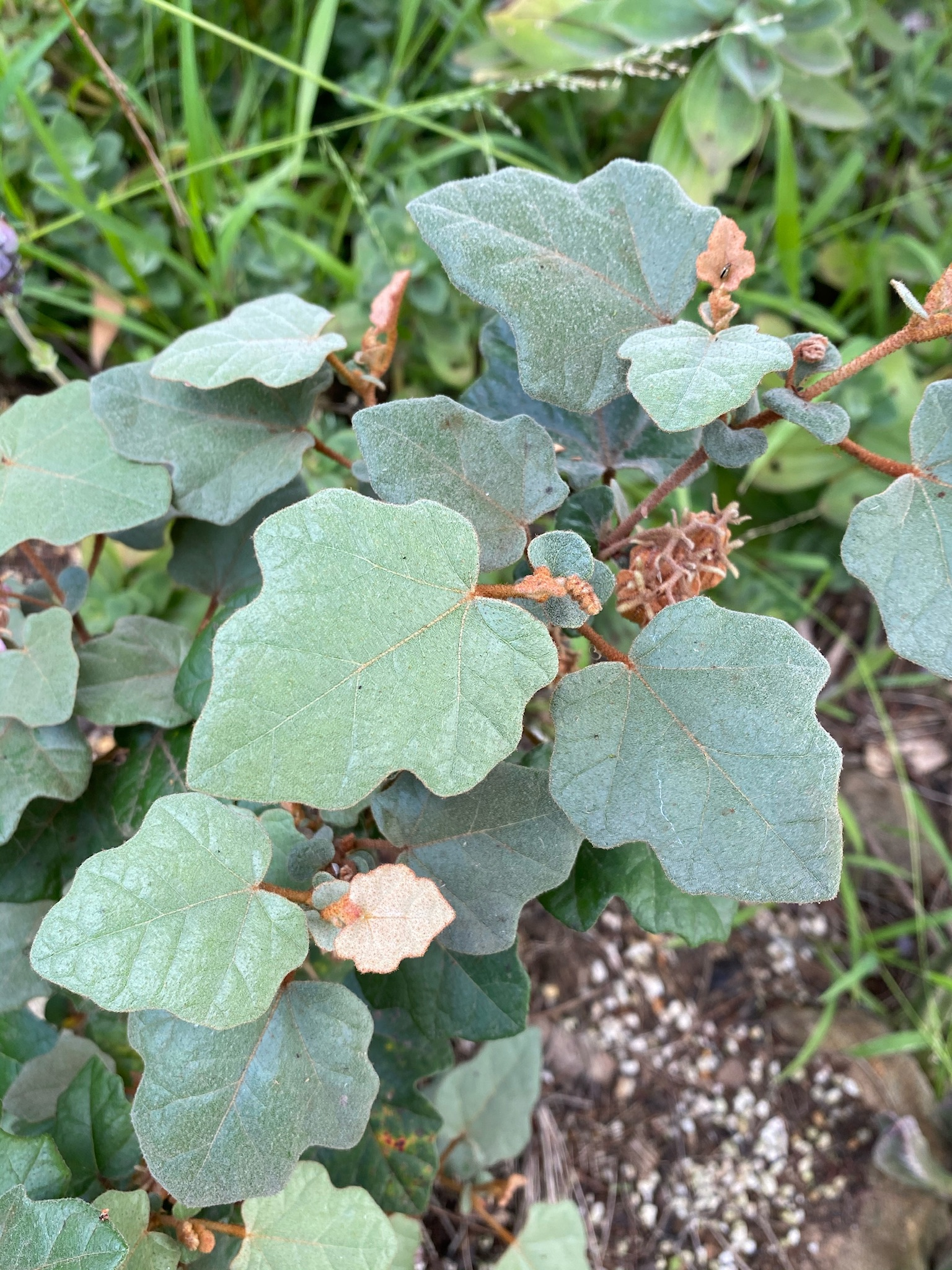
Foliage

Thomasia triphylla is a small shrub that is endemic to the south-west of Western Australia. The flowers are pinkish-purple, bell-shaped and hang in pendents from the leaf axils.

== Description ==
Thomasia triphylla is a small, multi-stemmed shrub 0.3–1.2 m (1 ft 0 in – 3 ft 11 in) high with hairy stems. The leaves are 25–60 mm (0.98–2.36 in) long and 10–35 mm (0.39–1.38 in) wide, margins deeply and irregularly lobed and the surface covered in star shaped hairs. The two stipules at the base of the leaves are deciduous, 10–15 mm (0.39–0.59 in) long and visible only on the younger leaves. The calyx are purple, pink or white, smooth, five free stamens and filaments 4 mm (0.16 in) long. Flowering may occur in July, August, or spring.

== Taxonomy and naming ==
Thomasia triphylla was first formally described in 1821 by Jacques Etienne Gay and the description was published in Memoires du Museum d'Histoire Naturelle. The specific epithet (triphylla) refers to "the 2 stipules at the base of the petiole are large and leaf like".

== Distribution and habitat ==
This species grows in limestone and sand dunes in coastal areas of south-west Western Australia and several locations from Albany to Esperance.
