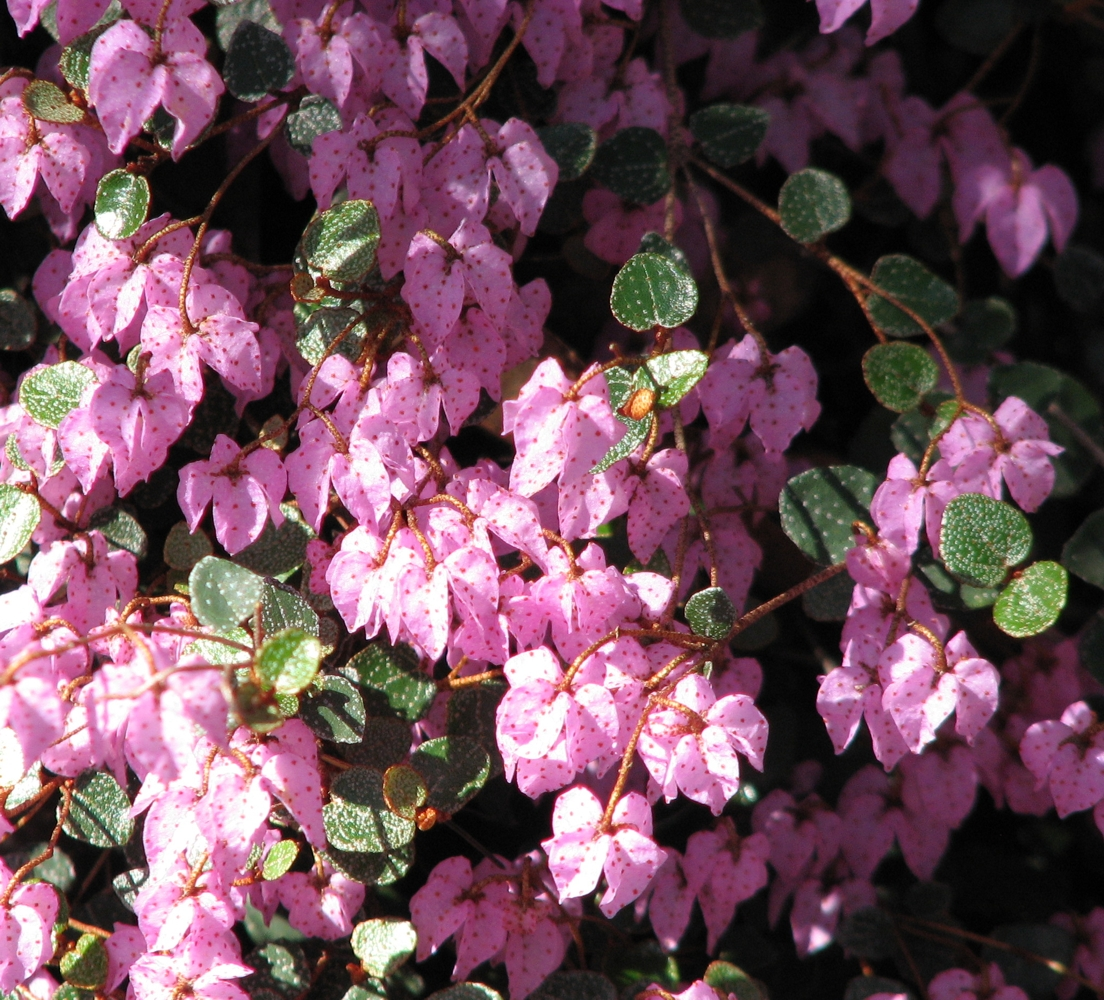
- In Royal Botanic Gardens, Cranbourne

Conservation status
- Priority Three — Poorly Known Taxa (DEC)

Scientific classification
- Kingdom: Plantae
- Clade: Tracheophytes
- Clade: Angiosperms
- Clade: Eudicots
- Clade: Rosids
- Order: Malvales
- Family: Malvaceae
- Genus: Thomasia
- Species: T. pygmaea

Binomial name
- Thomasia pygmaea (Turcz.) Benth.

Synonyms
- Asterochiton pygmaeus Turcz.; Lasiopetalum pygmaeum (Turcz.) F.Muell.; Lasiopetalum pygmalum F.Muell. orth. var.; Lasiopetalum pymacum F.Muell. orth. var.

= Thomasia pygmaea =

Tiny thomasia

Species of shrub

Thomasia pygmaea, commonly known as tiny thomasia, is a species of flowering plant in the family Malvaceae and is endemic to southern Western Australia. It is a low, dense, compact shrub with broadly heart-shaped to egg-shaped or more or less round leaves and pink to purple flowers.

== Description ==
Thomasia pygmaea is a dense, compact shrub that typically grows to 10–20 cm (3.9–7.9 in) high and up to 80 cm (31 in) wide, its stems covered with rust-coloured scales. Its leaves are broadly heart-shaped to egg-shaped or more or less round, 2–12 mm (0.079–0.472 in) long and 8–10 mm (0.31–0.39 in) wide on a petiole 10–15 mm (0.39–0.59 in) long. The surface of the leaves is covered with pale or rust-coloured scales, densely so on the lower surface. The flowers are 18 mm (0.71 in) in diameter and arranged singly or in pairs in leaf axils a scaly peduncle 30–40 mm (1.2–1.6 in) long, each flower on a pedicel 8–10 mm (0.31–0.39 in) long. The sepals are pink to purple and sparsely covered with scaly hairs. Flowering occurs from August to October.

== Taxonomy and naming ==
This species was first formally described in 1852 by Nicolai Stepanovitch Turczaninow who gave it the name Asterochiton pygmaeus in Bulletin de la Société Impériale des Naturalistes de Moscou from specimens collected by James Drummond. In 1863, George Bentham changed the name to Thomasia pygmaea in Flora Australiensis. The specific epithet (pygmaea) means "dwarf".

== Distribution and habitat ==
This thomasia grows in woodland and shrubland between the south of the Stirling Range and the west of Esperance in the Esperance Plains and Mallee bioregions of southern Western Australia.

== Conservation status ==
Thomasia pygmaea is listed as "Priority Three" by the Government of Western Australia Department of Biodiversity, Conservation and Attractions, meaning that it is poorly known and known from only a few locations but is not under imminent threat.

== Use in horticulture ==
Tiny thomasia is described as an attractive small shrub, useful for edging, container growing or in rockeries. It requires a light soil with good drainage and tolerates some shade and light frost.
