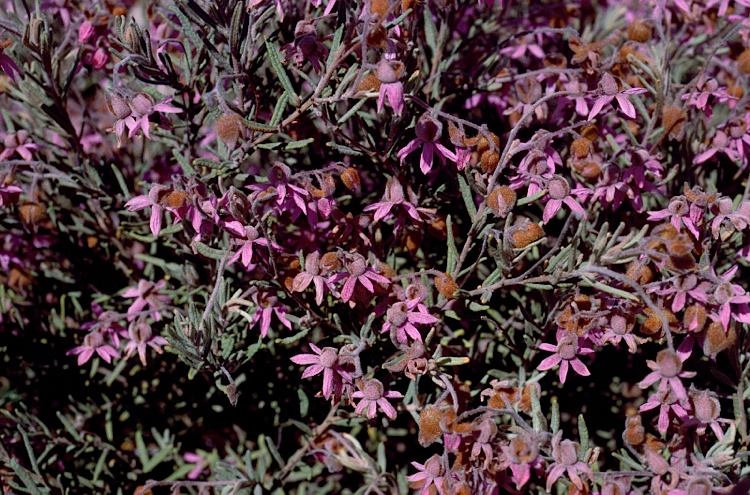

Scientific classification
- Kingdom: Plantae
- Clade: Tracheophytes
- Clade: Angiosperms
- Clade: Eudicots
- Clade: Rosids
- Order: Malvales
- Family: Malvaceae
- Genus: Thomasia
- Species: T. rugosa

Binomial name
- Thomasia rugosa Turcz.

Synonyms
- Leucothamnus polyspermus Turcz.

= Thomasia rugosa =

Wrinkled leaf thomasia

Species of plant

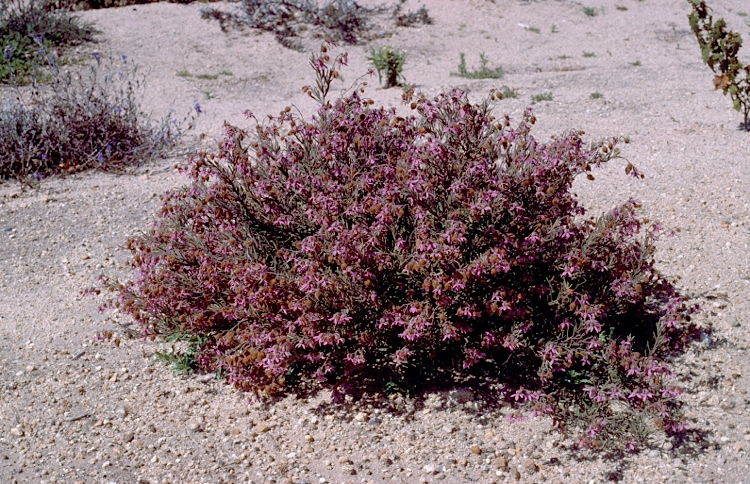
Habit

Thomasia rugosa, commonly known as wrinkled leaf thomasia, is a species of flowering plant in the family Malvaceae and is endemic to the south-west of Western Australia. It has wrinkled, lance-shaped to egg-shaped leaves with wavy edges, and pink to mauve flowers.

== Description ==
Thomasia rugosa is a densely-branched shrub that typically grows to 0.6–1 m (2 ft 0 in – 3 ft 3 in) high and 1.5 m (4 ft 11 in) wide, its young branchlets densely covered with star-shaped hairs. The leaves are wrinkled, lance-shaped to egg-shaped base, 25–75 mm (0.98–2.95 in) long and 30–35 mm (1.2–1.4 in) wide, on a petiole up to 20 mm (0.79 in) long with hairy, wing-like stipules 8–10 mm (0.31–0.39 in) long at the base. The edges of the leaves are wavy, the lower surface densely woolly-hairy. The flowers are pink to mauve, about 12 mm (0.47 in) wide, and arranged in racemes on a hairy peduncle, with hairy bracteoles at the base of the sepals. The sepals are 6–8 mm (0.24–0.31 in) long but there are no petals. Flowering occurs from August to December.

== Taxonomy and naming ==
Thomasia rugosa was first formally described in 1846 by Nikolai Turczaninow in the Bulletin de la Société Impériale des Naturalistes de Moscou, from specimens collected by James Drummond. The specific epithet (rugosa) means "wrinkled", referring to the leaves.

== Distribution and habitat ==
Wrinkled leaf thomasia grows in heath and mallee shrubland between Lake Grace, Pithara and Donnybrook in the Avon Wheatbelt, Esperance Plains, Jarrah Forest and Mallee bioregions of south-western Western Australia.

== Conservation status ==
Thomasia quercifolia is listed as "not threatened" by the Government of Western Australia Department of Biodiversity, Conservation and Attractions.
