= Thomasia discolor =

Scientific classification
- Kingdom: Plantae
- Clade: Tracheophytes
- Clade: Angiosperms
- Clade: Eudicots
- Clade: Rosids
- Order: Malvales
- Family: Malvaceae
- Genus: Thomasia
- Species: T. discolor

Binomial name
- Thomasia discolor Steud.

Species of shrub

Thomasia discolor is a species of flowering plant in the family Malvaceae and is endemic to the south-west of Western Australia. It is a small, compact shrub with hairy new growth, heart-shaped leaves with wavy, lobed edges, and pink flowers in crowded clusters.

== Description ==
Thomasia discolor is a compact shrub that typically grows to 0.5–1.5 m (1 ft 8 in – 4 ft 11 in) high, 0.8–1.5 m (2 ft 7 in – 4 ft 11 in) wide and has its young growth covered with rust-coloured, star-shaped hairs. The leaves are heart-shaped to oval, 25–50 mm (0.98–1.97 in) long and 20–40 mm (0.79–1.57 in) wide on a petiole up to 20 mm (0.79 in) long. The edges of the leaves are wavy and lobed, the lower surface densely covered with white or rust-coloured, star-shaped hairs. The flowers are arranged in crowded racemes of up to 10, each flower on a pedicel 6–7 mm (0.24–0.28 in) long, with hairy bracteoles at the base. The sepals are pink, up to 20 mm (0.79 in) long, but there are no petals. Flowering occurs from September to December.

== Taxonomy and naming ==
Thomasia discolor was first formally described in 1845 by Ernst Gottlieb von Steudel in Lehmann's Plantae Preissianae from specimens collected in 1840. The specific epithet (discolor) means "variegated", referring to the leaves.

== Distribution and habitat ==
This thomasia grows in coastal heath in moist places, hill slopes and tops in the Esperance Plains and Jarrah Forest bioregions of south-western Western Australia.

== Conservation status ==
Thomasia discolor is listed as "not threatened" by the Western Australian Government Department of Biodiversity, Conservation and Attractions.
