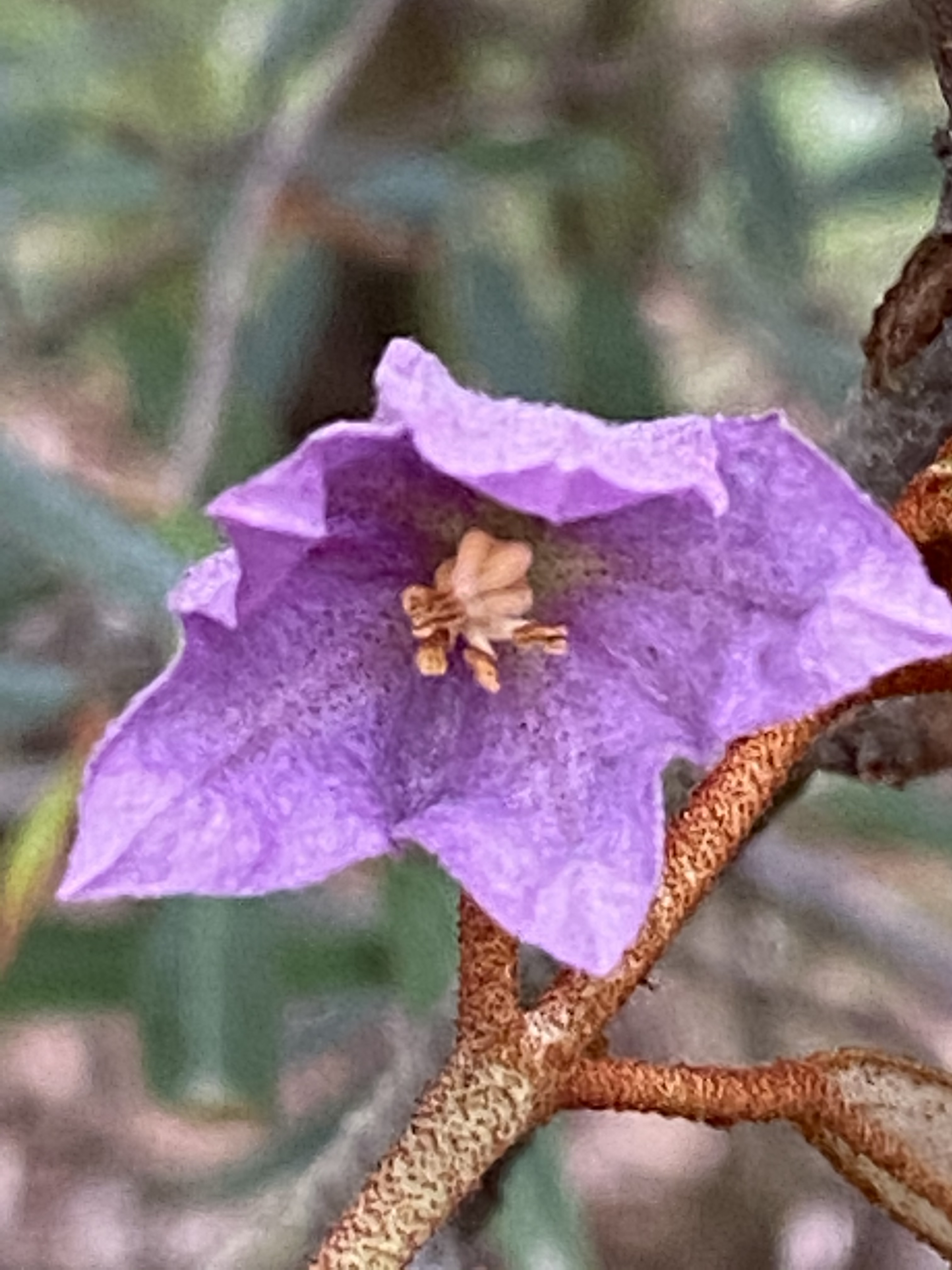

Scientific classification
- Kingdom: Plantae
- Clade: Tracheophytes
- Clade: Angiosperms
- Clade: Eudicots
- Clade: Rosids
- Order: Malvales
- Family: Malvaceae
- Genus: Thomasia
- Species: T. angustifolia

Binomial name
- Thomasia angustifolia Steud.

= Thomasia angustifolia =

Narrow-leaved thomasia

Species of flowering plant

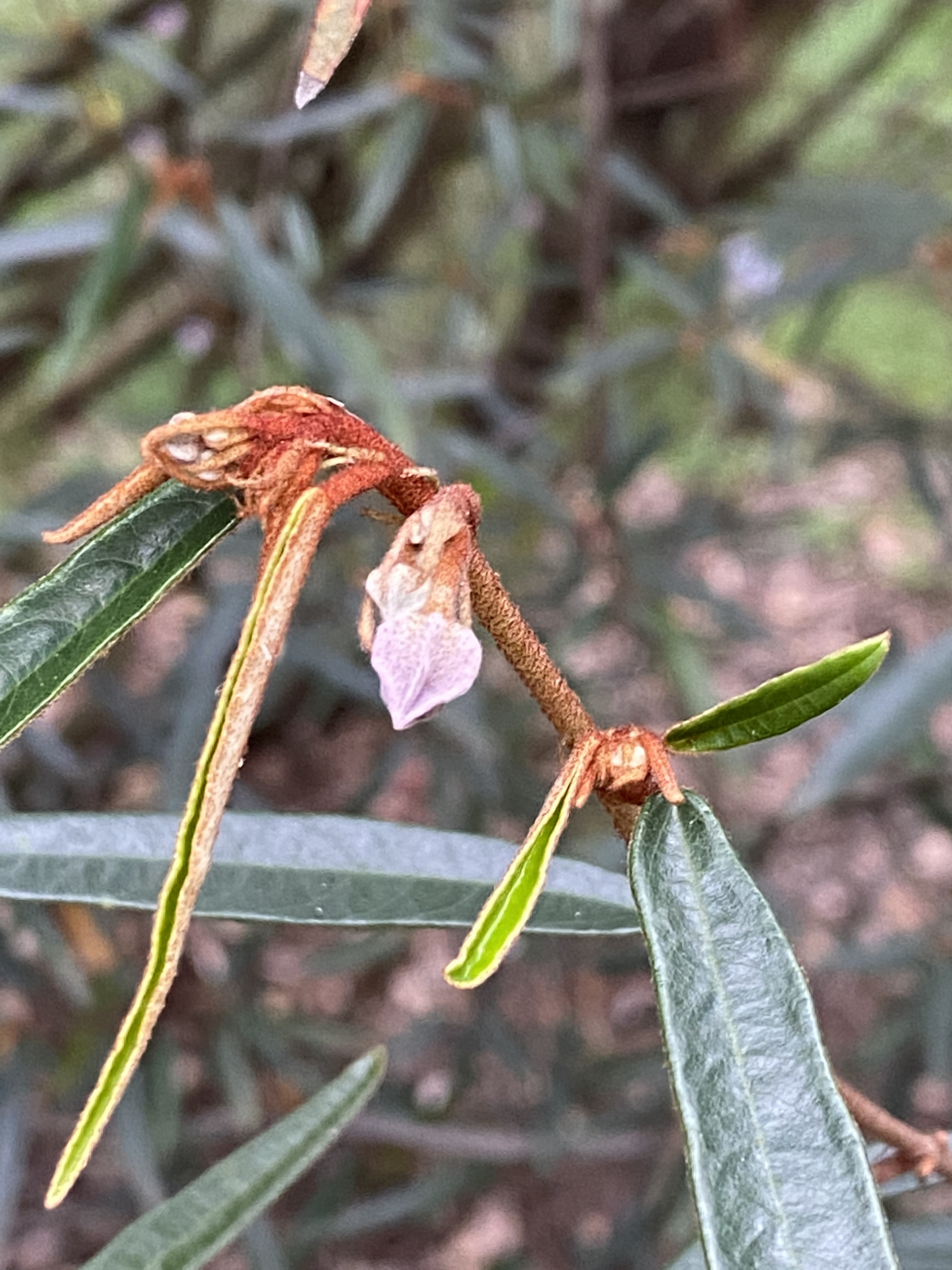
Foliage

Thomasia angustifolia, commonly known as narrow-leaved thomasia, is a species of flowering plant in the family Malvaceae and is endemic to the south-west of Western Australia. It has densely hairy young stems, narrowly oblong, wrinkled leaves and pinkish-purple, bell-shaped flowers.

== Description ==
Thomasia angustifolia is a shrub that sometimes grows to 1.5 m (4 ft 11 in) high and wide, but more usually 10–70 cm (3.9–27.6 in) high, its yound growth densely covered with star-shaped hairs. The leaves are usually narrowly oblong, 8–25 mm (0.31–0.98 in) long and 2–6 mm (0.079–0.236 in) wide on a petiole 4–5 mm (0.16–0.20 in) long. The leaves are wavy and wrinkled with the edges rolled under, the lower side a paler shade of green and covered with star-shaped hairs. There are wing-like stipules 5–6 mm (0.20–0.24 in) long at the base of the petiole. The flowers are arranged in racemes of 2 to 8 that are 30–40 mm (1.2–1.6 in) long, each flower up to 15 mm (0.59 in) wide, on a pedicel about 7 mm (0.28 in) long, with hairy bracteoles 6–7 mm (0.24–0.28 in) long at the base. The sepals are pink and hairy, the petals red and rounded but very small 1 mm (0.039 in) long, and the style is longer than the stamens.

== Taxonomy and naming ==
Thomasia angustifolia was first formally described by botanist Ernst Gottlieb von Steudel in 1845 who published the description in Lehmann's Plantae Preissianae. The specific epithet (angustifolia) is from the Latin angustus meaning "narrow" and folium meaning "leaf".

== Distribution and habitat ==
Narrow-leaved thomasia is found growing in loam, sand plains and occasionally damp locations near creeks from Albany and west to Esperance.
