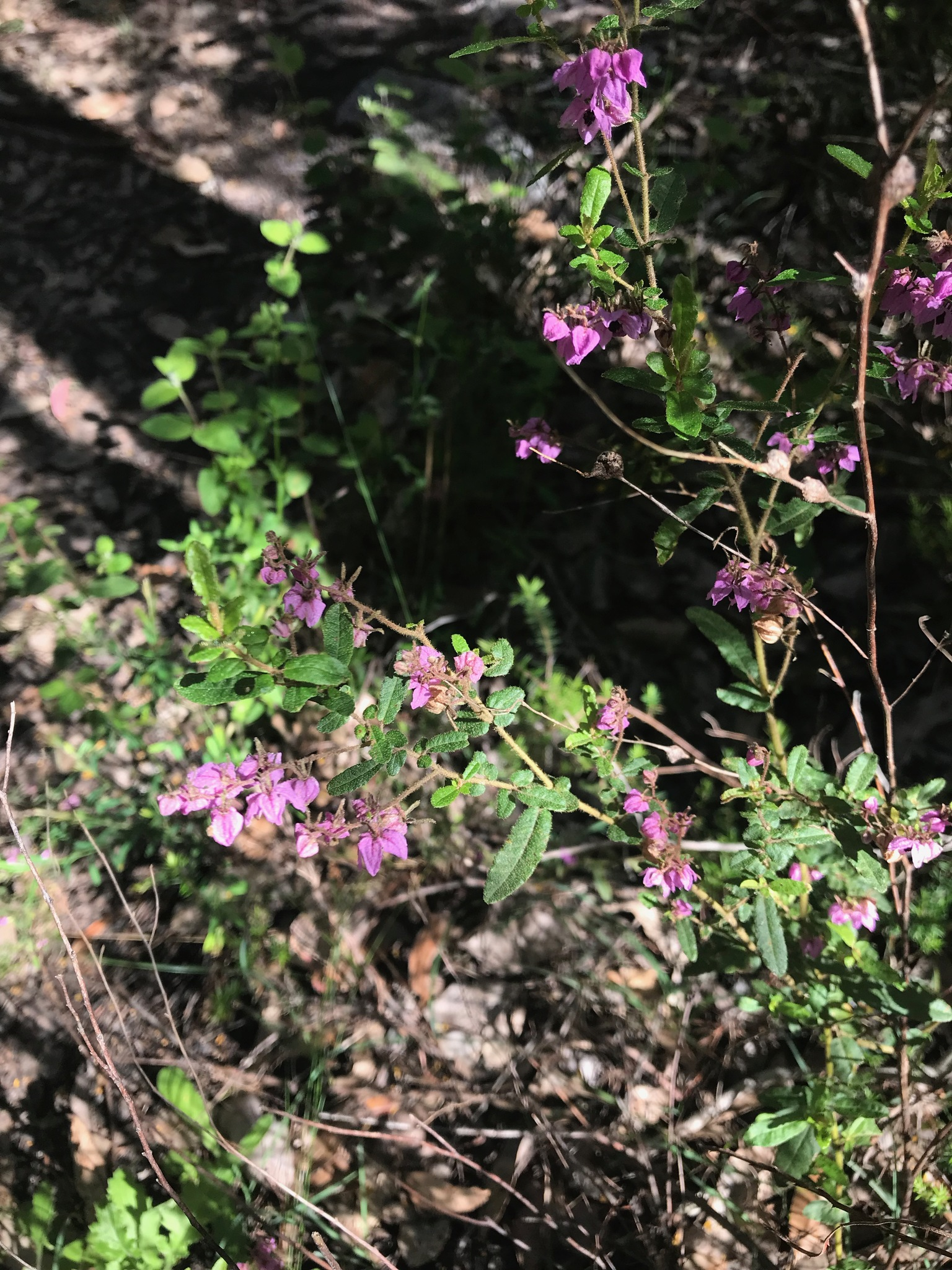
- In Porongurup National Park

Scientific classification
- Kingdom: Plantae
- Clade: Tracheophytes
- Clade: Angiosperms
- Clade: Eudicots
- Clade: Rosids
- Order: Malvales
- Family: Malvaceae
- Genus: Thomasia
- Species: T. rhynchocarpa

Binomial name
- Thomasia rhynchocarpa Turcz.

= Thomasia rhynchocarpa =

Species of shrub

Thomasia rhynchocarpa is a species of flowering plant in the family Malvaceae and is endemic to the Southwest Australia south-west of Western Australia. It is an erect, slender shrub with narrowly egg-shaped leaves with a heart-shaped base, and pink to purple flowers.

== Description ==
Thomasia rhynchocarpa is an erect, slender shrub that typically grows to 0.3–1.5 m (1 ft 0 in – 4 ft 11 in) high and up to 2 m (6 ft 7 in) wide, its branchlets densely covered with rust-coloured, star-shaped hairs. The leaves are narrowly egg-shaped with a heart-shaped base, 20–80 mm (0.79–3.15 in) long and 8–25 mm (0.31–0.98 in) wide on a densely hairy petiole up to 18 mm (0.71 in) long. The edges of the leaves are sometimes lobed, the edges wavy and both surfaces have scattered hairs. There are stipules 15–20 mm (0.59–0.79 in) wide at the base of the petioles. The flowers are 25 mm (0.98 in) in diameter, arranged in racemes of 2 to 8, about 7 mm (0.28 in) long, each flower on a pedicel 5–8 mm (0.20–0.31 in) long. The sepals are pink to purple, sometimes white, and joined for about half their length. There are minute bracts at the base of the flowers and the petals are tiny. Flowering mainly occurs from July to December, and the fruit is a dehiscent capsule.

== Taxonomy and naming ==
Thomasia brachystachys was first formally described in 1852 by Nikolai Turczaninow in Bulletin de la Société Impériale des Naturalistes de Moscou. The specific epithet (brachystachys) means "a short flower spike".

== Distribution and habitat ==
This thomasia grows in heath and shrubland or in forests near watercourses and swamps in near-coastal areas from Yallingup to Pemberton, and further east to the Stirling Range and Porongurup National Parks.

== Conservation status ==
Thomasia brachystachys is classified as "not threatened" by the Western Australian Government Department of Biodiversity, Conservation and Attractions.

== Use in horticulture ==
This thomasia is described as a dramatic species that has proved reliable in a range of conditions when grown in well-drained soil, but appreciates water during dry periods. It can be propagated from both seed and cuttings.
