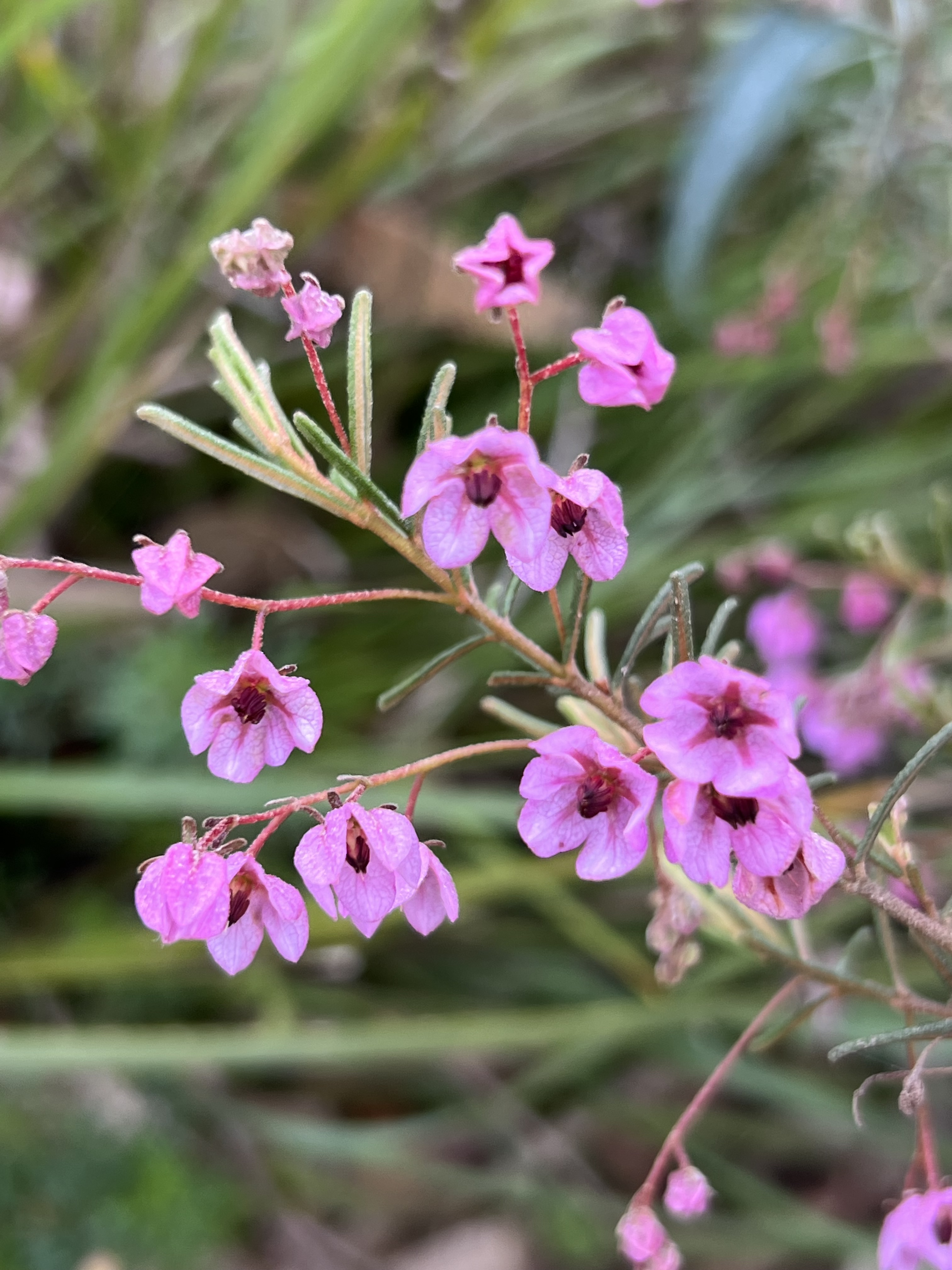

Scientific classification
- Kingdom: Plantae
- Clade: Tracheophytes
- Clade: Angiosperms
- Clade: Eudicots
- Clade: Rosids
- Order: Malvales
- Family: Malvaceae
- Genus: Thomasia
- Species: T. sarotes

Binomial name
- Thomasia sarotes Turcz.

= Thomasia sarotes =

Species of shrub

Thomasia sarotes is a species of flowering plant in the family Malvaceae. It is an upright, spreading shrub with purple, pink to mauve or white flowers and is endemic to the south-west of Western Australia.

== Description ==
Thomasia sarotes is an upright, spreading shrub that typically grows to 0.25–1.1 m (9.8 in – 3 ft 7.3 in) high and 1.2 m (3 ft 11 in) wide, its new growth covered with long, fine hairs. The leaves are linear, 10–25 mm (0.39–0.98 in) long and 1–2 mm (0.039–0.079 in) wide on a short petiole with linear stipules 6–16 mm (0.24–0.63 in) long at the base. The flowers are borne in groups of 2 to 5 on the ends of branches or in upper leaf axils on a peduncle about 20 mm (0.79 in) long, each flower on a pendent pedicel 4–6 mm (0.16–0.24 in) long with linear bracteoles at the base. The flowers are about 15 mm (0.59 in) in diameter, the sepals purple, pink to mauve or white, and the petals tiny. Flowering occurs from August to December.

== Taxonomy and naming ==
The species was first formally described in 1852 by botanist Nikolai Turczaninow and the description was published in the Bulletin de la Société Impériale des Naturalistes de Moscou. The specific epithet (sarotes) means "broom like".

== Distribution and habitat ==
This thomasia grows in clay, sand, granitic and rocky soils on low ridges and dunes in the Avon Wheatbelt, Coolgardie and Mallee.
