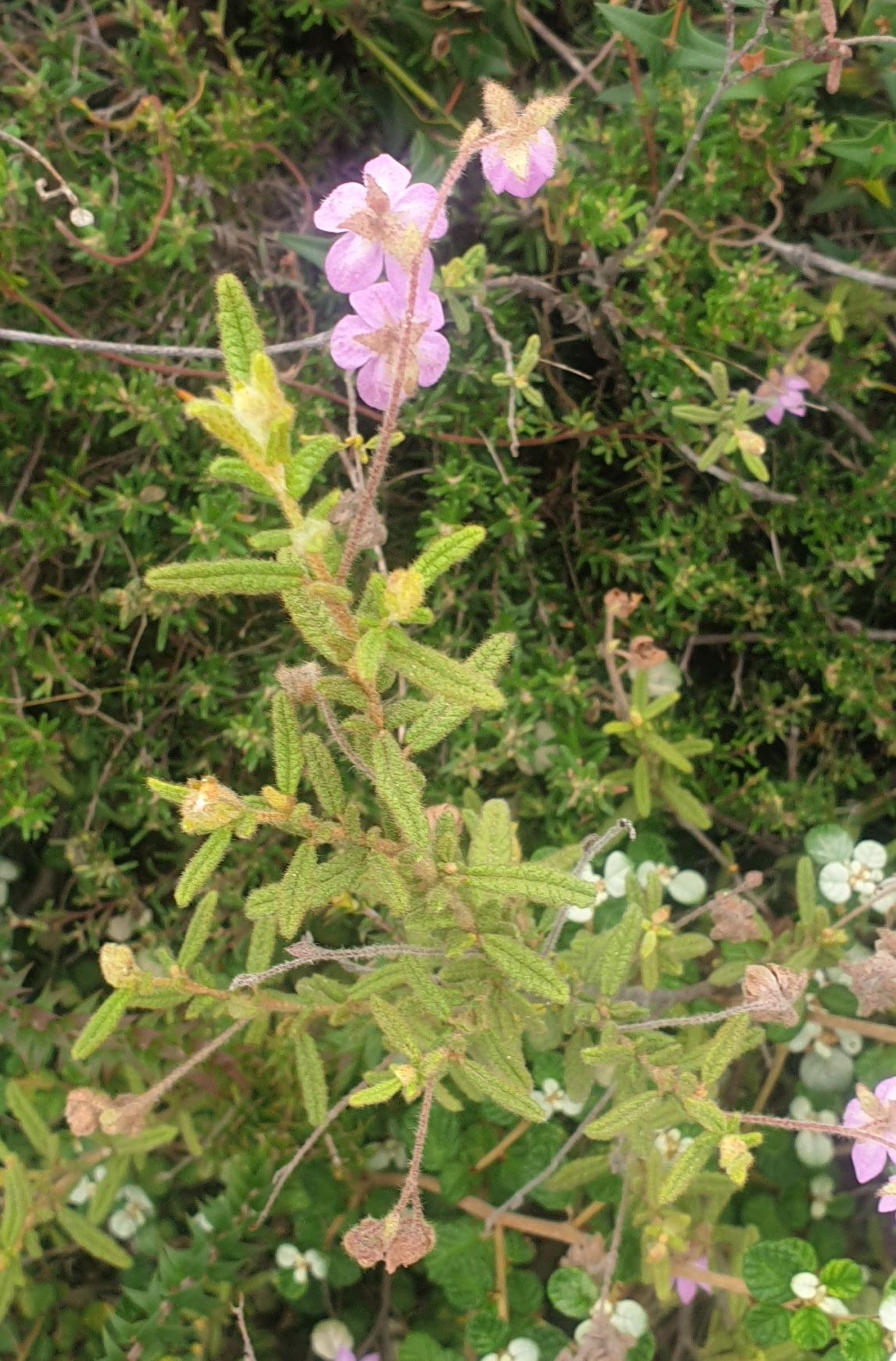
- In Great Otway National Park

Scientific classification
- Kingdom: Plantae
- Clade: Tracheophytes
- Clade: Angiosperms
- Clade: Eudicots
- Clade: Rosids
- Order: Malvales
- Family: Malvaceae
- Genus: Thomasia
- Species: T. petalocalyx

Binomial name
- Thomasia petalocalyx F.Muell.

= Thomasia petalocalyx =

Species of flowering plant

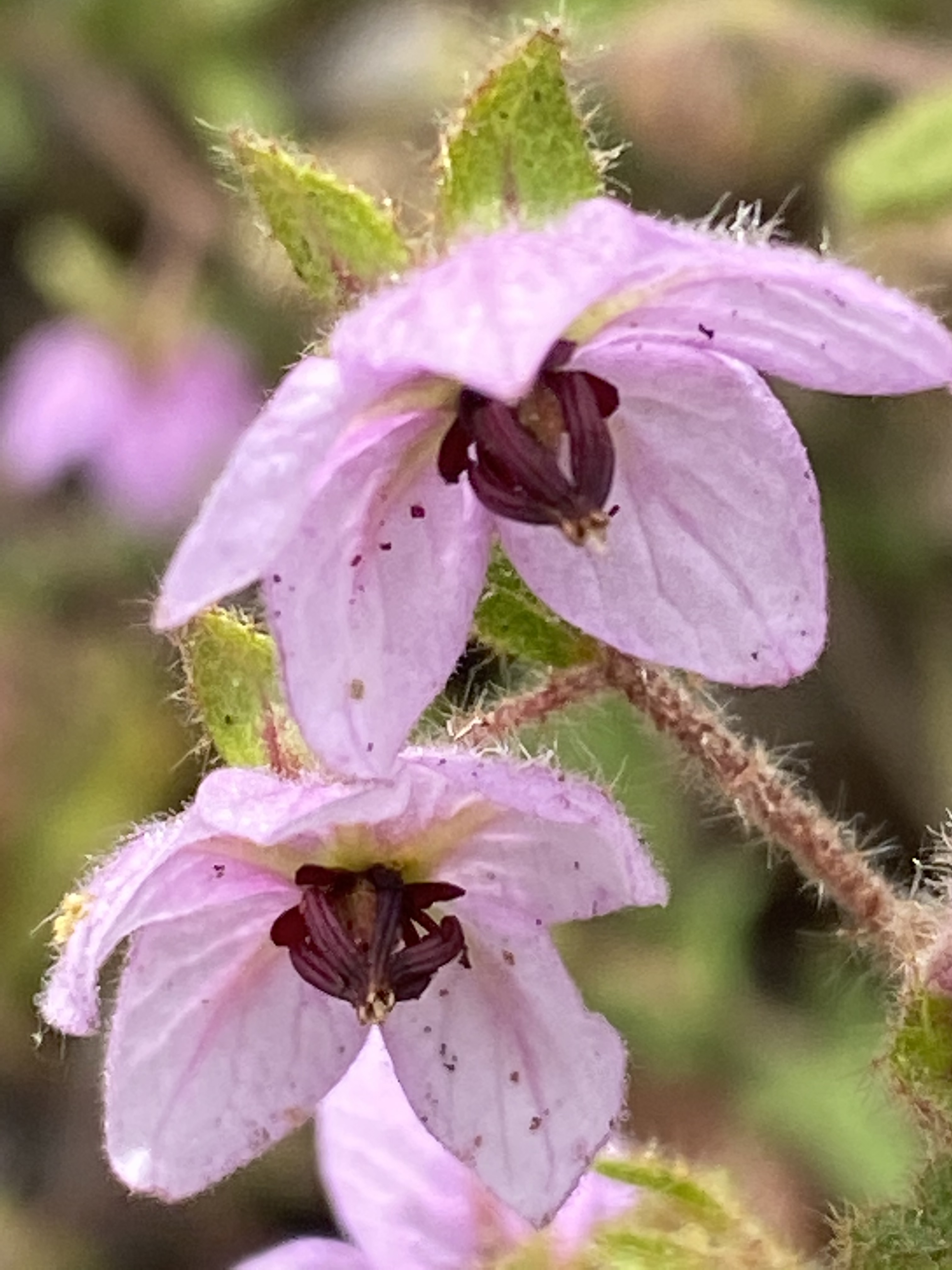
Flowers

Thomasia petalocalyx, commonly known as paper flower, is a species of flowering plant in the family Malvaceae and is endemic to southern Australia. It is a shrub with wrinkled, oblong to egg-shaped leaves and cup-shaped mauve flowers.

== Description ==
Thomasia petalocalyx is a shrub that typically grows to 0.5–1.5 m (1 ft 8 in – 4 ft 11 in) high, 0.5–2 m (1 ft 8 in – 6 ft 7 in) wide and has its new growth covered in star-shaped hairs. The leaves are oblong to egg-shaped, 20–40 mm (0.79–1.57 in) long and 5–13 mm (0.20–0.51 in) wide on a petiole 2–8 mm (0.079–0.315 in) long with hairy brown, wing-like stipules 8–12 mm (0.31–0.47 in) long at the base of the petioles. The leaves are covered with star-shaped hairs, and the edges are wrinkled, turned down and finely toothed. The flowers are arranged singly or in racemes of up to 5 on a red peduncle 30–40 mm (1.2–1.6 in) long near the ends of the branches. Each flower is on a pedicel 6–8 mm (0.24–0.31 in) long, with 3 bracteoles 5–6 mm (0.20–0.24 in) long at the base. The sepals are mauve and form a cup-shaped flower 10–15 mm (0.39–0.59 in) wide, the petals deep red and tiny.

== Taxonomy ==
Thomasia petalocalyx was first formally described in 1855 by Ferdinand von Mueller and the description was published in his book Definitions of rare or hitherto undescribed Australian plants. The specific epithet (petalocalyx) refers to the petal-like sepals.

== Distribution and habitat ==
Paper flower grows in forest, woodland, coastal heath and on granite outcrops in the Esperance Plains, Jarrah Forest and Mallee bioregions of southern Western Australia, in the south-east of South Australia, including on Kangaroo Island, and in scattered locations in the west and south-west of Victoria, with an isolated population on Wilsons Promontory, where it is common.
