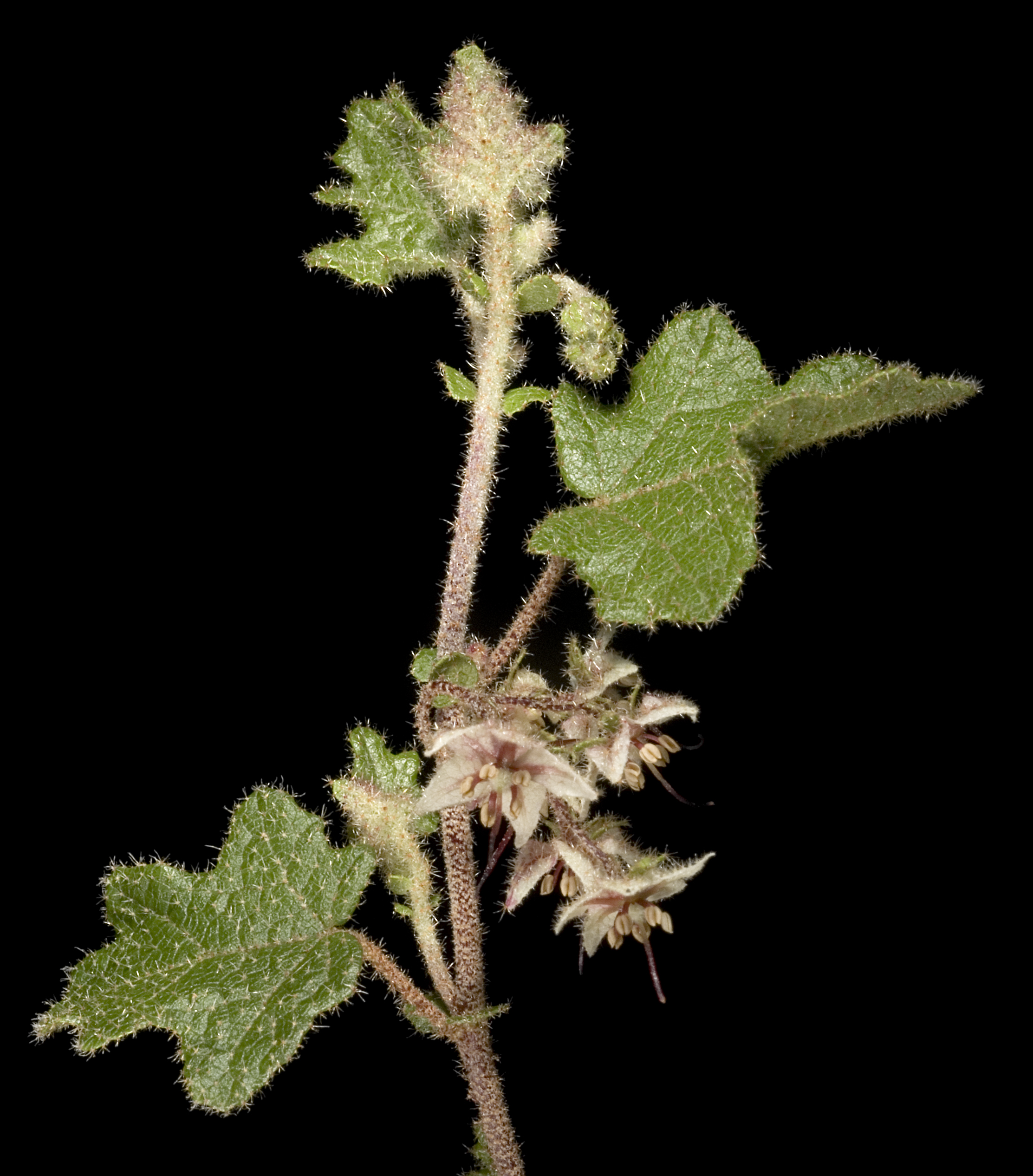

Scientific classification
- Kingdom: Plantae
- Clade: Tracheophytes
- Clade: Angiosperms
- Clade: Eudicots
- Clade: Rosids
- Order: Malvales
- Family: Malvaceae
- Genus: Thomasia
- Species: T. foliosa

Binomial name
- Thomasia foliosa J.Gay

= Thomasia foliosa =

Species of shrub

Thomasia discolor is a species of flowering plant in the family Malvaceae and is endemic to the south-west of Western Australia. It is a multi-stemmed shrub with densely hairy branchlets, coarsely serrated, egg-shaped leaves with a heart-shaped base, and many small pink, cream-coloured or white flowers.

== Description ==
Thomasia discolor is a multistemmed shrub that typically grows to 0.3–1 m (1 ft 0 in – 3 ft 3 in) high, 1–2 m (3 ft 3 in – 6 ft 7 in) wide and has its branchlets densely covered with star-shaped hairs. The leaves are egg-shaped with a heart-shaped base, 6–45 mm (0.24–1.77 in) long and 5–25 mm (0.20–0.98 in) wide on a petiole 5–18 mm (0.20–0.71 in) long. The edges of the leaves are coarsely serrated, the lower surface paler than the upper surface and sparsely hairy. The flowers are arranged in racemes of 3 to 10 about 10 mm (0.39 in) long, each flower on a pedicel 2–4 mm (0.079–0.157 in) long, with linear bracts and sparsely hairy bracteoles 2–3 mm (0.079–0.118 in) long at the base. The sepals are pink, cream-coloured or white. Flowering occurs from May to November.

== Taxonomy and naming ==
Thomasia discolor was first formally described in 1821 by Jaques Étienne Gay in the journal Mémoires du Muséum d'Histoire Naturelle, from specimens collected at Geographe Bay in 1801. The specific epithet (foliosa) means "leafy".

== Distribution and habitat ==
This thomasia grows in gravelly or granitic soil in shrubby understorey between Mogumber and Stokes Inlet in the Avon Wheatbelt, Esperance Plains, Geraldton Sandplains, Jarrah Forest, Mallee, Swan Coastal Plain and Warren bioregions of south-western Western Australia.

== Conservation status ==
Thomasia foliosa is listed as "not threatened" by the Western Australian Government Department of Biodiversity, Conservation and Attractions.
