= Thomasia tremandroides =

Scientific classification
- Kingdom: Plantae
- Clade: Tracheophytes
- Clade: Angiosperms
- Clade: Eudicots
- Clade: Rosids
- Order: Malvales
- Family: Malvaceae
- Genus: Thomasia
- Species: T. tremandroides

Binomial name
- Thomasia tremandroides Paust

Species of shrub

Thomasia tremandroides is a species of flowering plant in the family Malvaceae and is endemic to the south-west of Western Australia. It is an erect or low, spreading shrub with many stems, flimsy, papery, egg-shaped leaves and racemes of papery, mauve to pink flowers.

== Description ==
Thomasia tremandroides is an erect shrub that typically grows to 10–60 cm (3.9–23.6 in) high and 5–100 mm (0.20–3.94 in) wide, its many stems covered with both simple and star-shaped hairs. Its leaves are flimsy, papery and egg-shaped, 4–10 mm (0.16–0.39 in) long and 2.5–7 mm (0.098–0.276 in) wide on a minute petiole with egg-shaped, leaf-like stipules 2–5 mm (0.079–0.197 in) long at the base. Both surface of the leaves are densely covered with fine, star-shaped hairs. The flowers are arranged singly or in racemes of up to 4 on a densely hairy peduncle, each flower 12–15 mm (0.47–0.59 in) wide on a densely hairy pedicel with 3 hairy bracteoles about 5 mm (0.20 in) long at the base. The sepals are papery, mauve to pink, the petals purplish-black and minute. Flowering occurs from August to November.

== Taxonomy ==
Thomasia tremandroides was first formally described in 1974 by Susan Paust in the journal Nuytsia from specimens she collected north of Wubin in 1972. The specific epithet (tremandroides) means resembling some species of "Tremandraceae", (now included in the family Elaeocarpaceae).

== Distribution and habitat ==
This thomasia grows in open situations or as an undershrub between Bencubbin and the Murchison River, but mainly south of Three Springs, in the Avon Wheatbelt, Geraldton Sandplains and Murchison bioregions in the south-west of Western Australia.

== Conservation status ==
Thomasia microphylla is listed as "not threatened" by the Government of Western Australia Department of Biodiversity, Conservation and Attractions.
