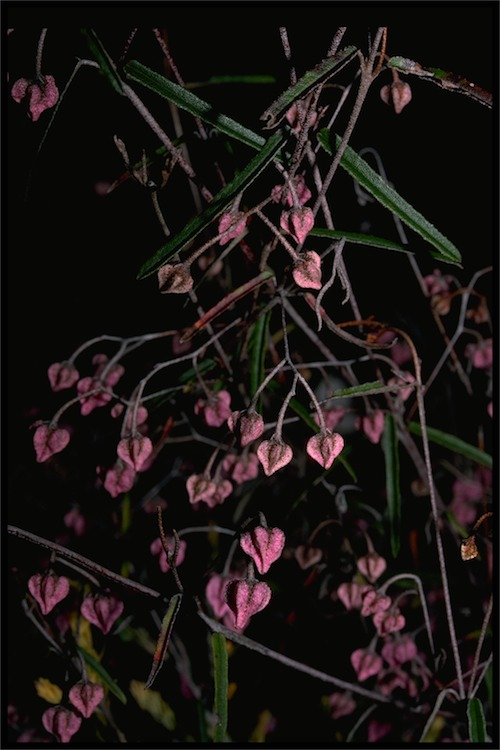

Scientific classification
- Kingdom: Plantae
- Clade: Tracheophytes
- Clade: Angiosperms
- Clade: Eudicots
- Clade: Rosids
- Order: Malvales
- Family: Malvaceae
- Genus: Thomasia
- Species: T. stelligera

Binomial name
- Thomasia stelligera (Turcz.) Benth.

= Thomasia stelligera =

Species of shrub

Thomasia stelligera is a species of flowering plant in the family Malvaceae and is endemic to the south-west of Western Australia. It is a low, spreading shrub with scattered, narrowly oblong leaves, and racemes of mauve flowers.

== Description ==
Thomasia stelligera is a spreading, spindly shrub that typically grows to 20–60 cm (7.9–23.6 in) high and 30–50 m (98–164 ft) wide, its new growth covered with scaly hairs. The leaves are narrowly oblong, 20–30 mm (0.79–1.18 in) long and 4–6 mm (0.16–0.24 in) wide on a petiole 4–5 mm (0.16–0.20 in) long. The leaves are glabrous on the upper surface, covered with silvery hairs on the lower surface and have wavy edges. The flowers are arranged in racemes of 2 to 4 on a thin peduncle 20–40 mm (0.79–1.57 in) long, each flower on a pedicel 8–10 mm (0.31–0.39 in) long with scaly bracteoles at the base. The flowers are up to 15 mm (0.59 in) in diameter, the sepals mauve and scaly, the petals tiny. Flowering occurs from August to October.

== Taxonomy and naming ==
This species was first formally described in 1852 by Nikolai Turczaninow who gave it the name Lasiopetalum stelligerum in the Bulletin de la Société Impériale des Naturalistes de Moscou. In 1863, George Bentham transferred the species to the genus Thomasia in Flora Australiensis. The specific epithet (stelligera) means "starry" or "star-bearing".

== Distribution and habitat ==
This thomasia grows in heath and shrubland between the Oldfield River, Jerramungup and Denmark in the Esperance Plains, Jarrah Forest, Mallee and Warren bioregions of south-western Western Australia.

== Conservation status ==
Thomasia stelligera is listed as "not threatened" by the Government of Western Australia Department of Biodiversity, Conservation and Attractions.
