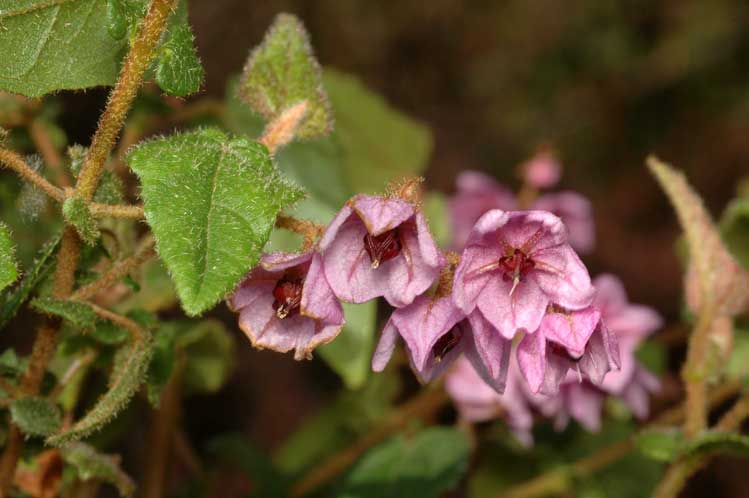

Scientific classification
- Kingdom: Plantae
- Clade: Tracheophytes
- Clade: Angiosperms
- Clade: Eudicots
- Clade: Rosids
- Order: Malvales
- Family: Malvaceae
- Genus: Thomasia
- Species: T. pauciflora

Binomial name
- Thomasia pauciflora Lindl.

= Thomasia pauciflora =

Species of shrub

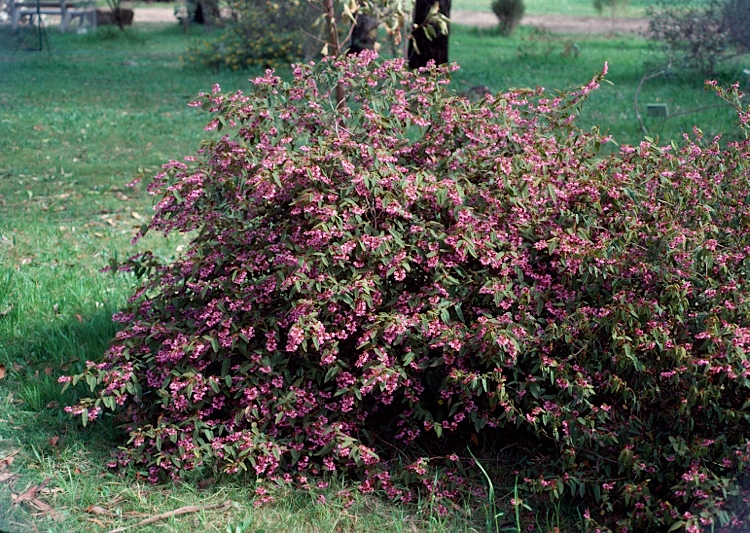
Habit in the Wittunga Botanic Garden

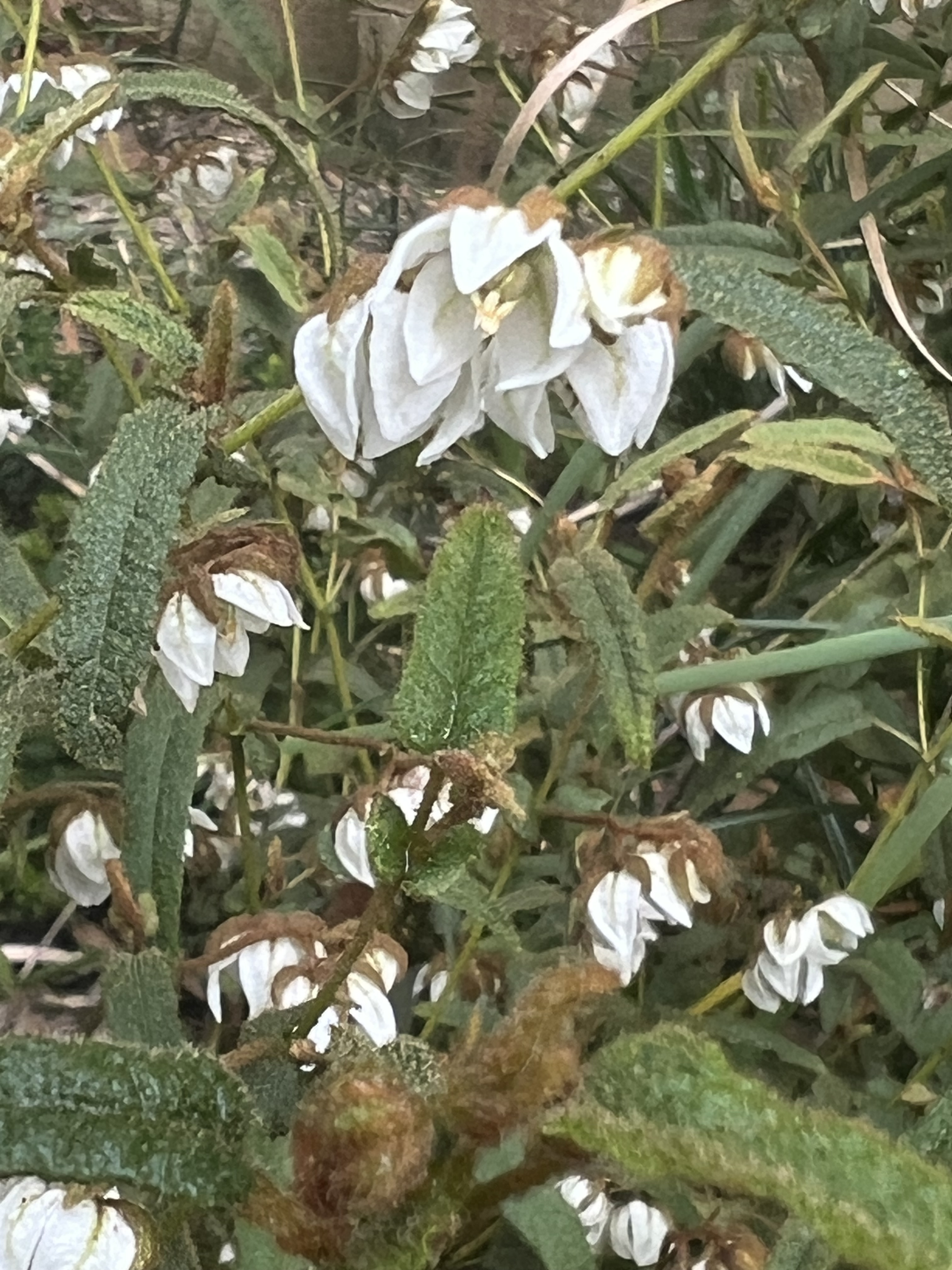
White form

Thomasia pauciflora, commonly known as few-flowered thomasia, is a species of flowering plant in the family Malvaceae and is endemic to the south-west of Western Australia. It is a slender, erect or straggling shrub with egg-shaped leaves and pink to purple, occasionally white flowers.

== Description ==
Thomasia pauciflora is a slender, erect or straggling shrub that typically grows to 0.2–1.5 m (7.9 in – 4 ft 11.1 in) high and up to 1 m (3 ft 3 in) wide, its new growth densely covered with rust-coloured, star-shaped hairs. The leaves are egg-shaped, 15–45 mm (0.59–1.77 in) long and 3–12 mm (0.12–0.47 in) wide on a petiole 6–18 mm (0.24–0.71 in) long with kidney-shaped stipules at the base. The edges of the leaves are wavy, sometimes lobed and both sides are covered with scattered rust-coloured, star-shaped hairs. The flowers are 12–15 mm (0.47–0.59 in) in diameter and arranged in racemes of up to 4 on a peduncle up to 20–25 mm (0.79–0.98 in) long. Each flower is on a pedicel 2–4 mm (0.079–0.157 in) long with egg-shaped bracts and similar bracteoles 3–5 mm (0.12–0.20 in) long at the base. The sepals are pink to purple, occasionally white, and covered with star-shaped hairs. Flowering occurs from August to February.

== Taxonomy ==
Thomasia pauciflora was first formally described in 1839 by John Lindley in A Sketch of the Vegetation of the Swan River Colony. The specific epithet (pauciflora) means "few-flowered".

== Distribution and habitat ==
This thomasia usually grows as an understorey plant in winter-wet areas and swamps in jarrah and marri woodland and is widespread mainly from Perth to near Albany in the Esperance Plains, Jarrah Forest, Swan Coastal Plain and Warren bioregions of south-western Western Australia.

== Conservation status ==
Thomasia pauciflora is listed as "not threatened" by the Government of Western Australia Department of Biodiversity, Conservation and Attractions.
