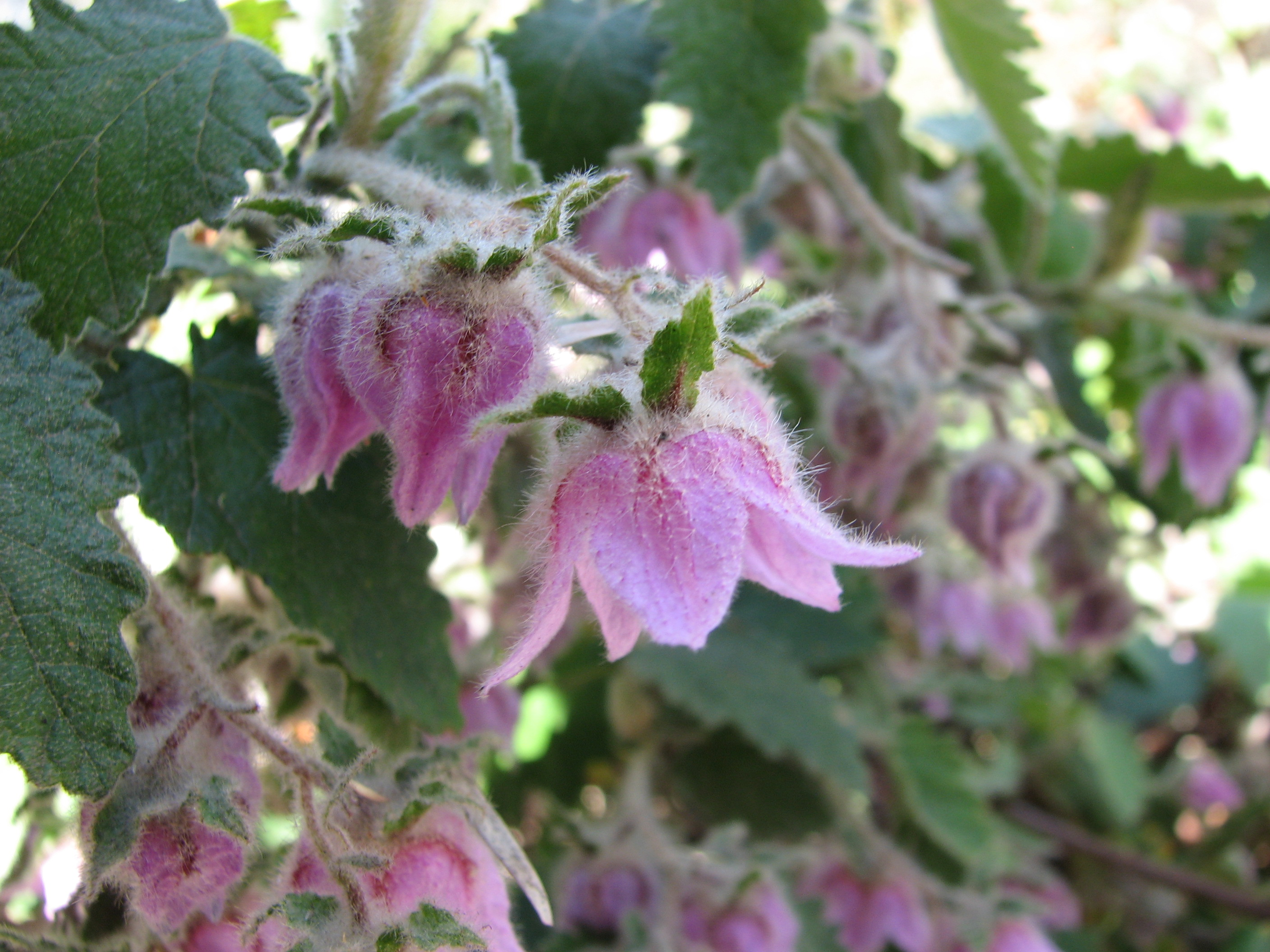

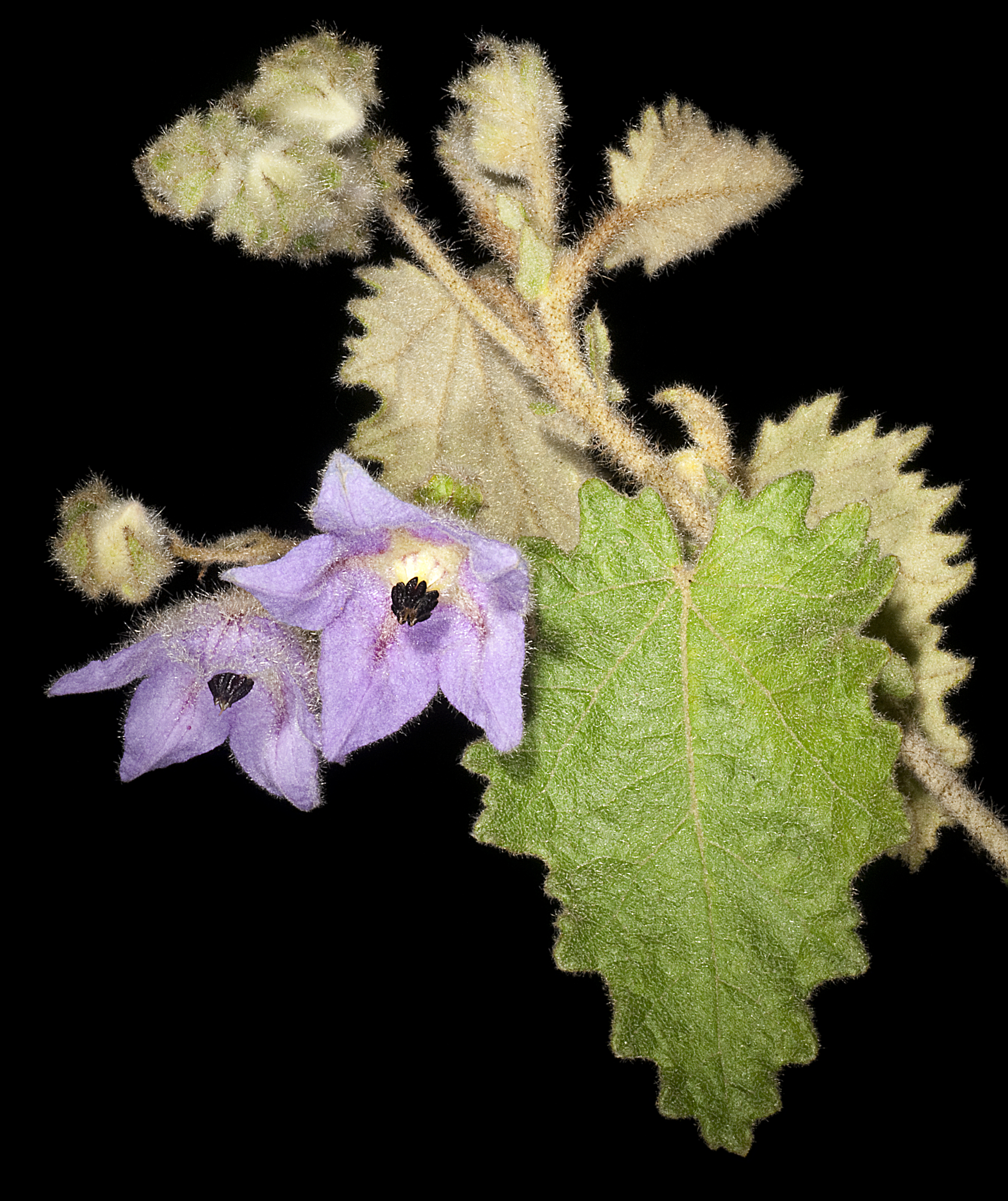

Scientific classification
- Kingdom: Plantae
- Clade: Tracheophytes
- Clade: Angiosperms
- Clade: Eudicots
- Clade: Rosids
- Order: Malvales
- Family: Malvaceae
- Genus: Thomasia
- Species: T. macrocarpa

Binomial name
- Thomasia macrocarpa Endl.

= Thomasia macrocarpa =

Species of shrub

Thomasia macrocarpa, commonly known as large-fruited thomasia, is a shrub that is endemic to the southwest of Western Australia.

== Description ==
Thomasia macrocarpa is a small, spreading shrub growing to about 1.5 m (4 ft 11 in) high and 1 m (3 ft 3 in) wide. The stems are hairy, the grey-green leaves 30–120 mm (1.2–4.7 in) long and 15–70 mm (0.59–2.76 in) wide with finely toothed margins and star-shaped hairs. The leaves are heart to egg-shaped, velvety when young and become smooth as they age. The conspicuous pink to purple flowers are produced between August and November in the species' native range. Occasionally white flowers are seen. The flowers are about 10 mm (0.39 in) in diameter with a perianth consisting of two bracts and the pedicel 7–15 mm (0.28–0.59 in) long. The flower petals are small lobes and the surface is covered in star-shaped hairs. The flowers are followed by capsules containing black seeds which are shed from the plant when ripe.

== Taxonomy and naming ==
Thomasia macrocarpa was first formally described by Austrian botanist Stephan Endlicher in 1839 in Novarum Stirpium Decades, based on a horticultural specimen. The specific epithet (macrocarpa) is derived from the ancient Greek words makros (μακρός) meaning "long" and karpos (καρπός) meaning "fruit".

== Distribution and habitat ==
Large-fruited thomasia usually grows in damp places near creeks or in well-drained soil in shady places and is found on and near the Darling Scarp from Glen Forrest to Canning Dam, with an outlier further south near Cowaramup, in the Jarrah Forest, Swan Coastal Plain and Warren bioregions of south-western Western Australia.

== Conservation status ==
This thomasia is listed as "not threatened" by the Government of Western Australia Department of Biodiversity, Conservation and Attractions.
