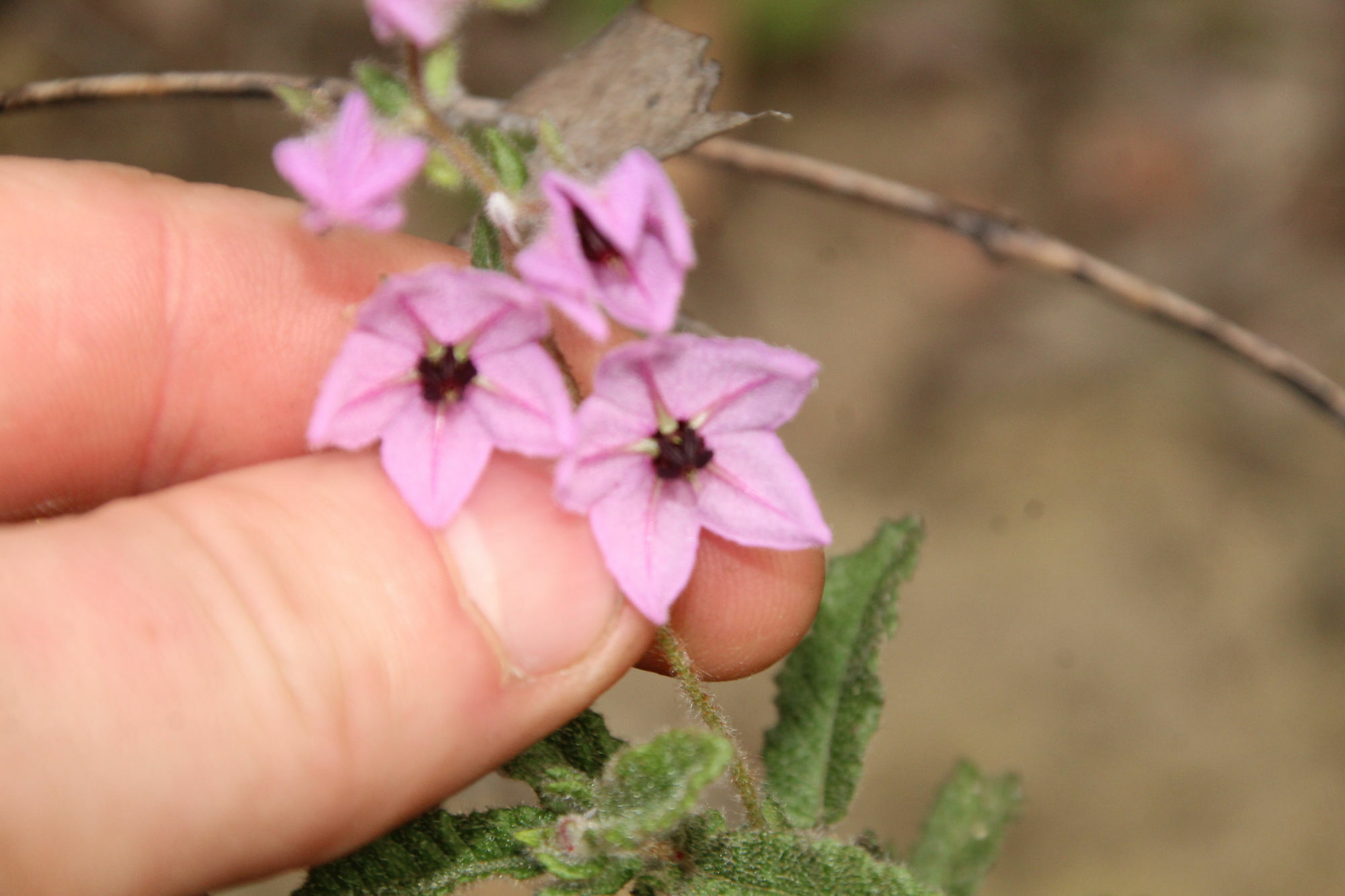

Conservation status
- Vulnerable (EPBC Act)

Scientific classification
- Kingdom: Plantae
- Clade: Tracheophytes
- Clade: Angiosperms
- Clade: Eudicots
- Clade: Rosids
- Order: Malvales
- Family: Malvaceae
- Genus: Thomasia
- Species: T. montana

Binomial name
- Thomasia montana Steud.

= Thomasia montana =

Species of shrub

Thomasia montana, commonly known as hill thomasia, is a species of flowering plant in the family Malvaceae and is endemic to the south-west of Western Australia. It is an upright to low, ground-covering shrub with hairy new growth, egg-shaped to broadly oblong leaves, sometimes with wavy or toothed edges, and pale purplish-pink to maroon flowers.

== Description ==
Thomasia montana is an upright to low, ground covering shrub that typically grows to 0.3–1 m (1 ft 0 in – 3 ft 3 in) high and up to 1 m (3 ft 3 in) wide and has its young growth covered with star-shaped hairs. The leaves are egg-shaped to broadly oblong, 15–25 mm (0.59–0.98 in) long and 8–10 mm (0.31–0.39 in) wide on a petiole 6–8 mm (0.24–0.31 in) long with lop-sided to kidney-shaped stipules at the base. The edges of the leaves are sometimes wavy or toothed, the lower surface with a few star-shaped hairs. The flowers are arranged in densely hairy racemes of 3 to 5 on a peduncle 50–60 mm (2.0–2.4 in) long, each flower 8–14 mm (0.31–0.55 in) in diameter on a hairy pedicel 8–10 mm (0.31–0.39 in) long, with hairy, linear bracteoles at the base. The sepals are pale purplish-pink to maroon and joined for about half their length and the petals are tiny. Flowering occurs in September and October.

== Taxonomy and naming ==
Thomasia montana was first formally described in 1845 by Ernst Gottlieb von Steudel in Lehmann's Plantae Preissianae from specimens collected in 1840. The specific epithet (montana) means "pertaining to mountains".

== Distribution and habitat ==
Hill thomasia grows in woodland and shrubland, sometimes on rocky outcrops or between granite boulders, near Brookton and York in the Avon Wheatbelt and Jarrah Forest bioregions of south-western Western Australia.

== Conservation status ==
Thomasia montana is listed as "vulnerable" under the Australian Government Environment Protection and Biodiversity Conservation Act 1999 and as "Threatened" by the Western Australian Government Department of Biodiversity, Conservation and Attractions, meaning that it is in danger of extinction.
