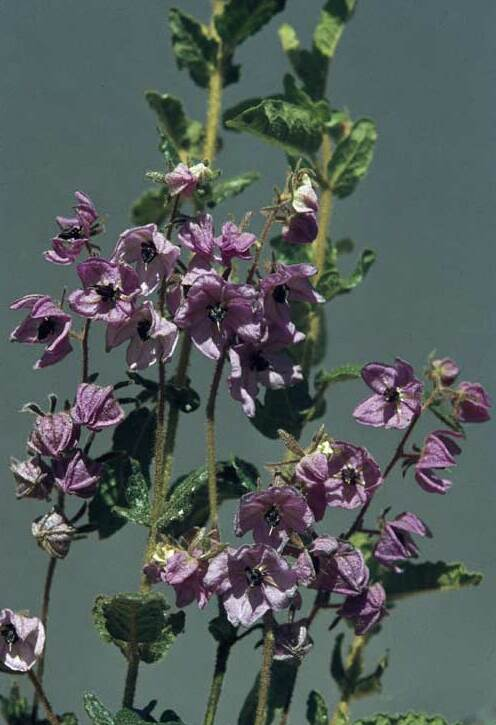
- Near Pingelly

Scientific classification
- Kingdom: Plantae
- Clade: Tracheophytes
- Clade: Angiosperms
- Clade: Eudicots
- Clade: Rosids
- Order: Malvales
- Family: Malvaceae
- Genus: Thomasia
- Species: T. macrocalyx

Binomial name
- Thomasia macrocalyx Steud.

= Thomasia macrocalyx =

Species of grass

Thomasia macrocalyx is a species of flowering plant in the family Malvaceae and is endemic to the south-west of Western Australia. It is an erect, bushy shrub with densely hairy new growth, egg-shaped leaves with a heart-shaped base and lobed or toothed edges, and groups of pale purple to mauve or white flowers.

== Description ==
Thomasia macrocalyx is an erect, bushy shrub that typically grows to a height of 0.3–2.5 m (1 ft 0 in – 8 ft 2 in), its young growth densely covered with pale or brownish, star-shaped hairs. The leaves are egg-shaped with a heart-shaped base, 40–80 mm (1.6–3.1 in) long and 25–50 mm (0.98–1.97 in) wide on a petiole 15–30 mm (0.59–1.18 in) long. The edges of the leaves are toothed or lobed, both surfaces densely covered with star-shaped hairs, the upper surface becoming glabrous with age. The flowers are arranged in hairy racemes of 2 to 6, 50 mm (2.0 in) long with egg-shaped bracteoles 10 mm (0.39 in) long at the base, the flowers 20–25 mm (0.79–0.98 in) in diameter. The sepals are joined at the base and covered with both simple and star-shaped hairs. Flowering occurs from May to December.

== Taxonomy and naming ==
Thomasia macrocalyx was first formally described in 1845 by Ernst Gottlieb von Steudel in Lehmann's Plantae Preissianae from specimens collected near Preston Beach. The specific epithet (macrocalyx) means "large calyx", referring to the sepals.

== Distribution and habitat ==
This thomasia grows on sandplains, hills and breakaways, often near creeks or on slopes, mainly near the Darling Range in the Avon Wheatbelt, Esperance Plains, Geraldton Sandplains, Jarrah Forest, Mallee and Swan Coastal Plain bioregions of south-western Western Australia.

== Conservation status ==
Thomasia macrocalyx is listed as "not threatened" by the Western Australian Government Department of Biodiversity, Conservation and Attractions.
