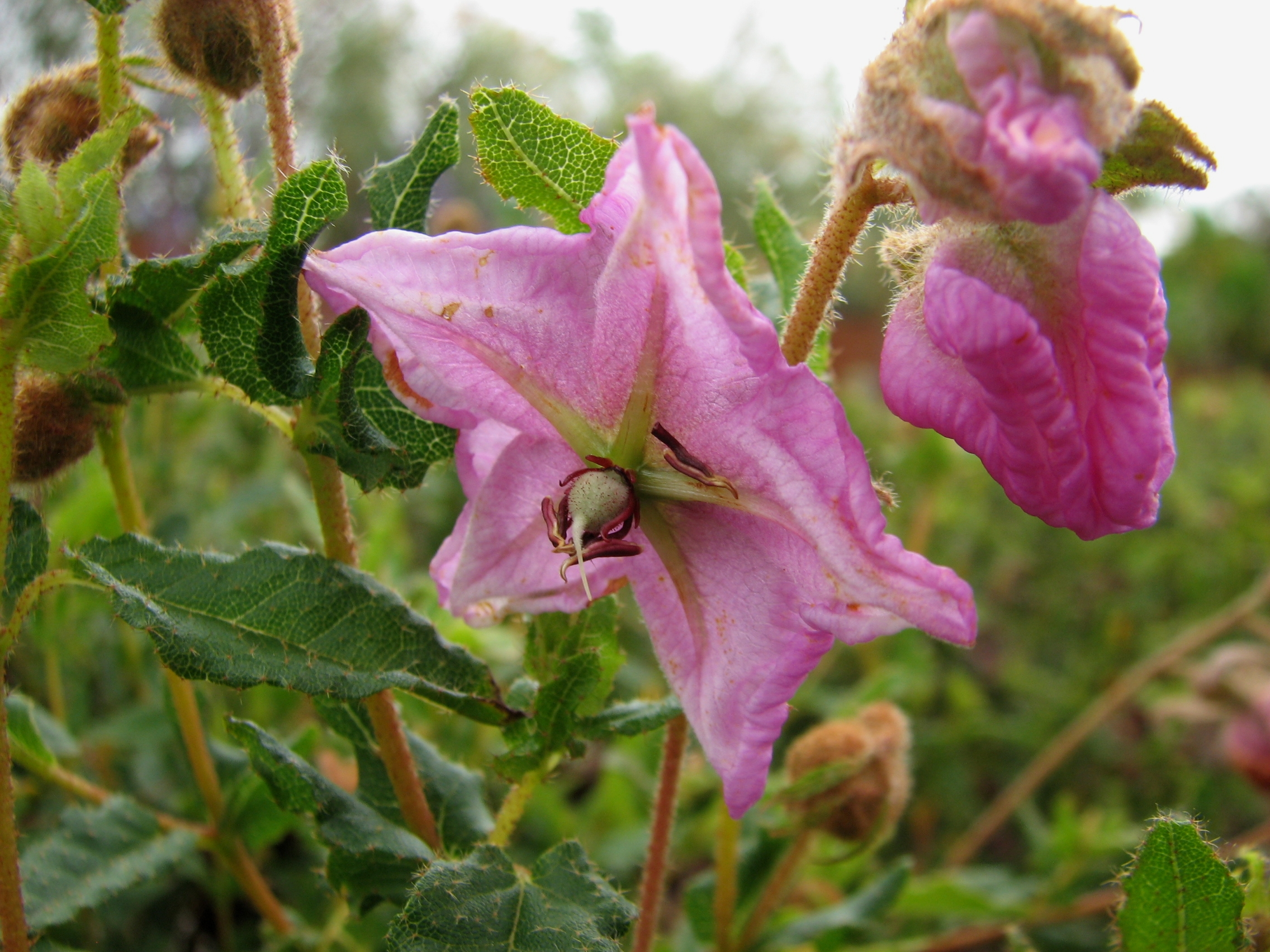

Scientific classification
- Kingdom: Plantae
- Clade: Tracheophytes
- Clade: Angiosperms
- Clade: Eudicots
- Clade: Rosids
- Order: Malvales
- Family: Malvaceae
- Genus: Thomasia
- Species: T. grandiflora

Binomial name
- Thomasia grandiflora Lindl.

= Thomasia grandiflora =

Species of plant

Thomasia grandiflora, commonly known as large-flowered thomasia, is endemic to the south-west of Western Australia. The flowers are pinkish-purple with a papery appearance hanging in pendents from the leaf axils. The calyx lobes are prominent and larger than the petals.

== Description ==
Thomasia grandiflora is a small shrub that grows to about 1 m (3 ft 3 in) high and wide. The dark, bright green leaves vary in shape, usually heart-shaped or occasionally narrowly elliptic, slightly flexible, leathery and 15–25 mm (0.59–0.98 in) long. The flowers have wide, conspicuous, pinkish-purple calyx lobes that are more prominent than the petals. The calyx is thicker near the mid-vein. The small petals are densely covered with star-shaped hairs, occasionally with only a few scattered hairs. The flowers have a papery texture and about 2 cm (0.79 in) across on short pendant stalks. The flowers are followed by capsules containing black seeds that are shed from the plant when ripe. Flowering occurs from winter to spring.

== Taxonomy and naming ==
Thomasia grandiflora was first formally described by botanist John Lindley in 1839 who published the description in A sketch of the vegetation of the Swan River Colony in 1839. The specific epithet (grandiflora) is from the Latin grandis meaning "large" or "great" and flos meaning "flower" referring to the large flowers of the species.

== Distribution and habitat ==
Large-flowered thomasia is a widespread species, mostly found in near-coastal locations growing in open forest in the south-west of Western Australia.
