= Thomasia gardneri =

Conservation status
- Extinct (EPBC Act)

Scientific classification
- Kingdom: Plantae
- Clade: Tracheophytes
- Clade: Angiosperms
- Clade: Eudicots
- Clade: Rosids
- Order: Malvales
- Family: Malvaceae
- Genus: Thomasia
- Species: †T. gardneri

Binomial name
- †Thomasia gardneri Paust

Species of shrub

Thomasia gardneri, commonly known as Mount Holland thomasia, is a species of flowering plant in the family Malvaceae and was endemic to a restricted area of Western Australia, but is now considered to be extinct. It was a low, erect shrub with scaly, narrowly egg-shaped leaves and racemes of pink flowers.

== Description ==
Thomasia gardneri was an erect, woody shrub that grew to a height of up to 50 cm (20 in), its branchlets, leaves and flower heads covered with small scales surrounded by short hairs. The leaves were arranged alternately, narrowly egg-shaped, 8–20 mm (0.31–0.79 in) long and 4–8 mm (0.16–0.31 in) wide on a petiole 2–4 mm (0.079–0.157 in) long. The flowers were arranged on the ends of branches in racemes of one or two flowers on a peduncle 5–15 mm (0.20–0.59 in) long, each flower on a pedicel about 5 mm (0.20 in) long. The sepals were pink and about 9 mm (0.35 in) long, the petals papery and about 1.5 mm (0.059 in) long, and the 5 anthers about 2 mm (0.079 in) long. Flowering was observed in September.

== Taxonomy ==
Thomasia gardneri was first formally described in 1974 by Susan Paust in the journal Nuytsia from specimens collected by Charles Gardner in September 1929. The specific epithet (gardneri) honours the collector of the type specimens.

== Distribution and habitat ==
This species of Thomasia is only known from specimens collected by Gardner from near Mount Holland, about 350 km (220 mi) east of Perth, in the Coolgardie bioregion of inland Western Australia. The details of its habitat are not known.

== Conservation status ==
Thomasia gardneri is listed as "extinct" under the Australian Government Environment Protection and Biodiversity Conservation Act 1999 and the Government of Western Australia Department of Biodiversity, Conservation and Attractions.
