= Susan J. Patrick =

Australian botanist and ecologist

- Born: 1944 (age 81–82); Hobart, Tasmania
- Occupations: Botanist, ecologist
- Scientific career
- Author abbrev. (botany): S.J.Patrick

Susan J. Patrick (born 1944) is an Australian botanist, taxonomist, illustrator, and ecologist at the Plant Biodiversity Center at CSIRO in Canberra. Her main works focus around the systematics of the family Sterculiaceae, and the conservation biology of forest and grassland ecosystems. She also works for the State of Western Australia, in the Department of Conservation and Land Management, and in biodiversity at the Global Biodiversity Infrastructure Facility.

== Selected publications ==
- Susan J. Patrick. 1995. Geraldton District Threatened Flora Recovery Team: Annual Report, 1994. Ed. Department of Conservation & Land Management, 12 pp.
- S.A. Halse, G.B. Pearson, Susan J. Patrick. 1993. Vegetation of Depth-gauged Wetlands in Nature Reserves of South-west Western Australia. Technical report 30 (Western Australia. Dept. of Conservation and Land Management) 146 pp.
- 1982. Guide to the gazetted rare flora of Western Australia (Report). Ed. Dept. of Fisheries and Wildlife ISBN 978-0724490868
