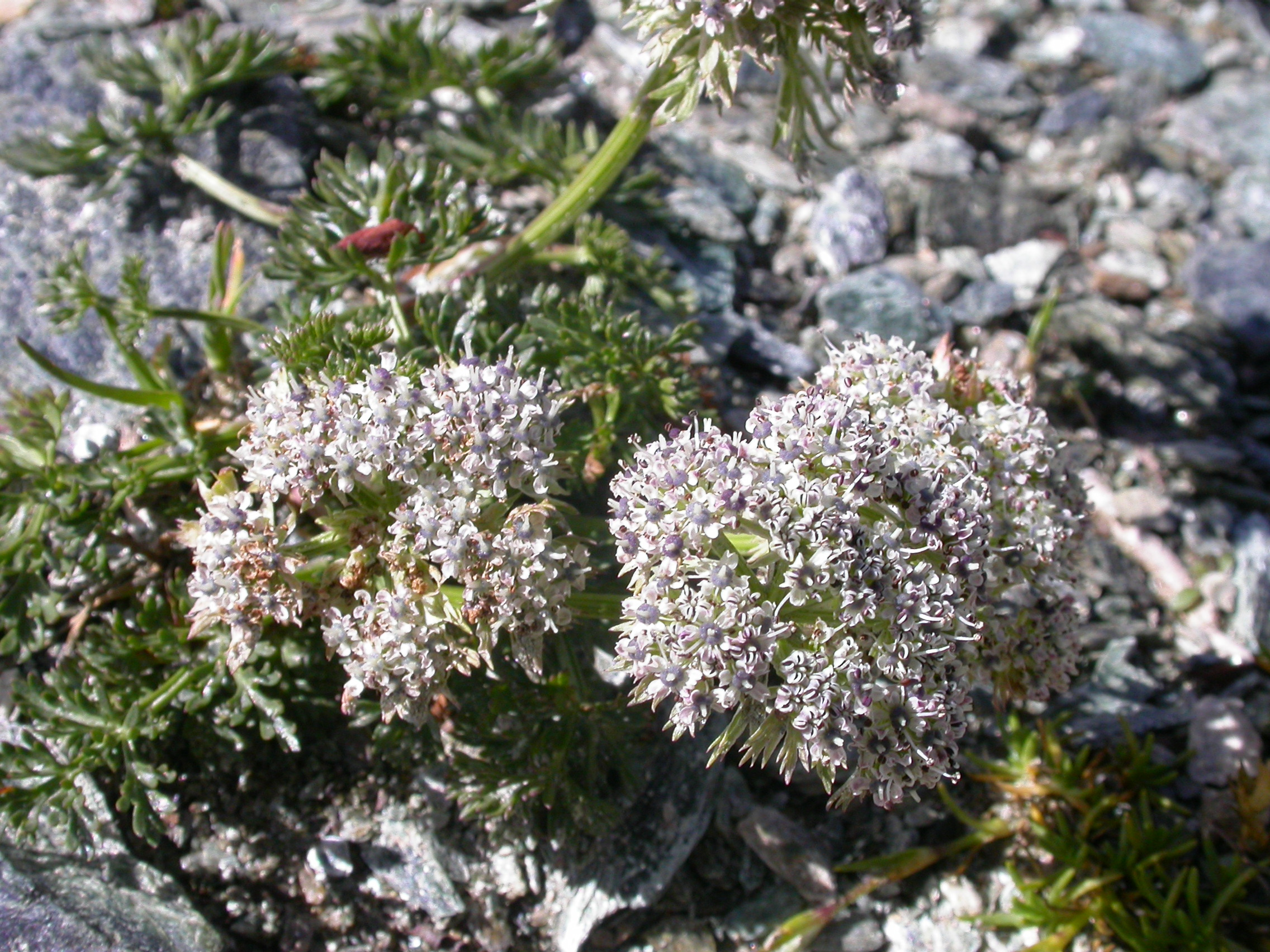
- Ligusticum mutellinoides

Scientific classification
- Kingdom: Plantae
- Clade: Tracheophytes
- Clade: Angiosperms
- Clade: Eudicots
- Clade: Asterids
- Order: Apiales
- Family: Apiaceae
- Subfamily: Apioideae
- Genus: Ligusticum; L.

Type species
- Ligusticum scoticum L.

= Ligusticum =

Genus of plants

Ligusticum (lovage, licorice-root) is a genus of about 60 species of flowering plants in the family Apiaceae, native to cool temperate regions of the Northern Hemisphere. Its name is believed to derive from the Italian region of Liguria.

== Species ==
- Ligusticum ajanense
- Ligusticum albanicum
- Ligusticum apiifolium
- Ligusticum brachylobum
- Ligusticum calderi
- Ligusticum californicum
- Ligusticum canadense
- Ligusticum canbyi - Canby's licorice root, ʔayut
- Ligusticum filicinum
- Ligusticum gingidium
- Ligusticum grayi - oshala, Gray's lovage
- Ligusticum holopetalum
- Ligusticum hultenii
- Ligusticum huteri
- Ligusticum ibukicola
- Ligusticum monnieri
- Ligusticum mutellina – alpine lovage
- Ligusticum porteri – oshá
- Ligusticum scoticum – Scots lovage
- Ligusticum striatum
- Ligusticum tenuifolium – Idaho lovage
- Ligusticum verticillatum – northern lovage

=== Former species ===
- Ligusticum mutellinoides – small alpine lovage, is a synonym of Neogaya simplex (L.) Meisn.

==== Moved to Conioselinum ====
In 2003, Pimenov moved a number of species to Conioselinum as he found them closer related to C. tataricum (the type species of C.) than to L. scoticum (the type species of L.). Another change C. anthriscoides ← L. sinense was made in 2015, as the C. sinomedicum name assigned in 2003 was illegitimate.

- L. acuminatum → C. acuminatum
- L. filifolium → C. nematophyllum
- L. gmelinii → C. chinense
- L. pteridophyllum → C. pteridophyllum ≡ L. pteridophylla, L. reptans
- L. pseudoangelica → C. pseudoangelica = L. glaucifolium
- L. sinense → [heterotypic] C. anthriscoides = L. chuanxiong, L. markgrafianum, L. pilgerianum (≡ L. harry-smithii)
  - gaoben 藁本; Szechuan lovage, Szechwan lovage, chuanxiong, chuan xiong 川芎
- L. smithii → C. smithii = L. longilobum (≡ L. longiloba), L. jeholense
- C. sinchianum = L. moniliforme
- L. tenuisectum → C. tenuisectum
- L. vaginatum → [heterotypic] C. tataricum
- L. tenuissimum → C. tenuissimum ≡ Angelica tenuissima = L. multifidum

== Uses ==
The roots of several species are used as medicinal herbs. L. sinense (in older literature L. wallichi or L. chuanxiong) is one of the 50 fundamental herbs used in Chinese herbology, where it is called chuānxiōng (川芎); in English, Szechwan lovage. Chinese Ligusticum root contains alkaloids that have been shown in studies to inhibit TNF-alpha production and TNF-alpha-mediated NF-kappaB activation. One study conducted in Japan showed the active compounds found in Ligusticum sinense have both anti-inflammatory and pain-reducing effects, exerting its anti-inflammatory benefits in the early and the late stages of processes in the inflammatory pathology.

L. porteri (osha) is used in Western herbal medicine.

Both Ligusticum sinense and L. jeholens essential oils contain natural antimicrobial and antioxidant agents.
