= Bear root =

Bear root may refer to:

- Ligusticum porteri, a perennial herb in the carrot family, also known as osha or bear root
- Hedysarum alpinum, an edible perennial herb in the bean family found in the circumpolar North
