= C24H28O4 =

The molecular formula C_{24}H_{28}O_{4} (molar mass: 380.484 g/mol, exact mass: 380.1988 u) may refer to:

- Diethylstilbestrol dipropionate (DESDP)
- Riligustilide
