= Rupert Huter =

Austrian clergyman and botanist

Rupert Huter (26 September 1834, Kals – 11 February 1919, Ried bei Sterzing) was an Austrian clergyman and botanist.

He studied theology in Brixen, afterwards working as an assistant priest in the town of Sankt Jakob in Defereggen. From 1861 to 1881, he served as a curate in several Austrian communities, later being named an expositur in Jaufental. From 1884 to 1918, he was a priest in Ried bei Sterzing.

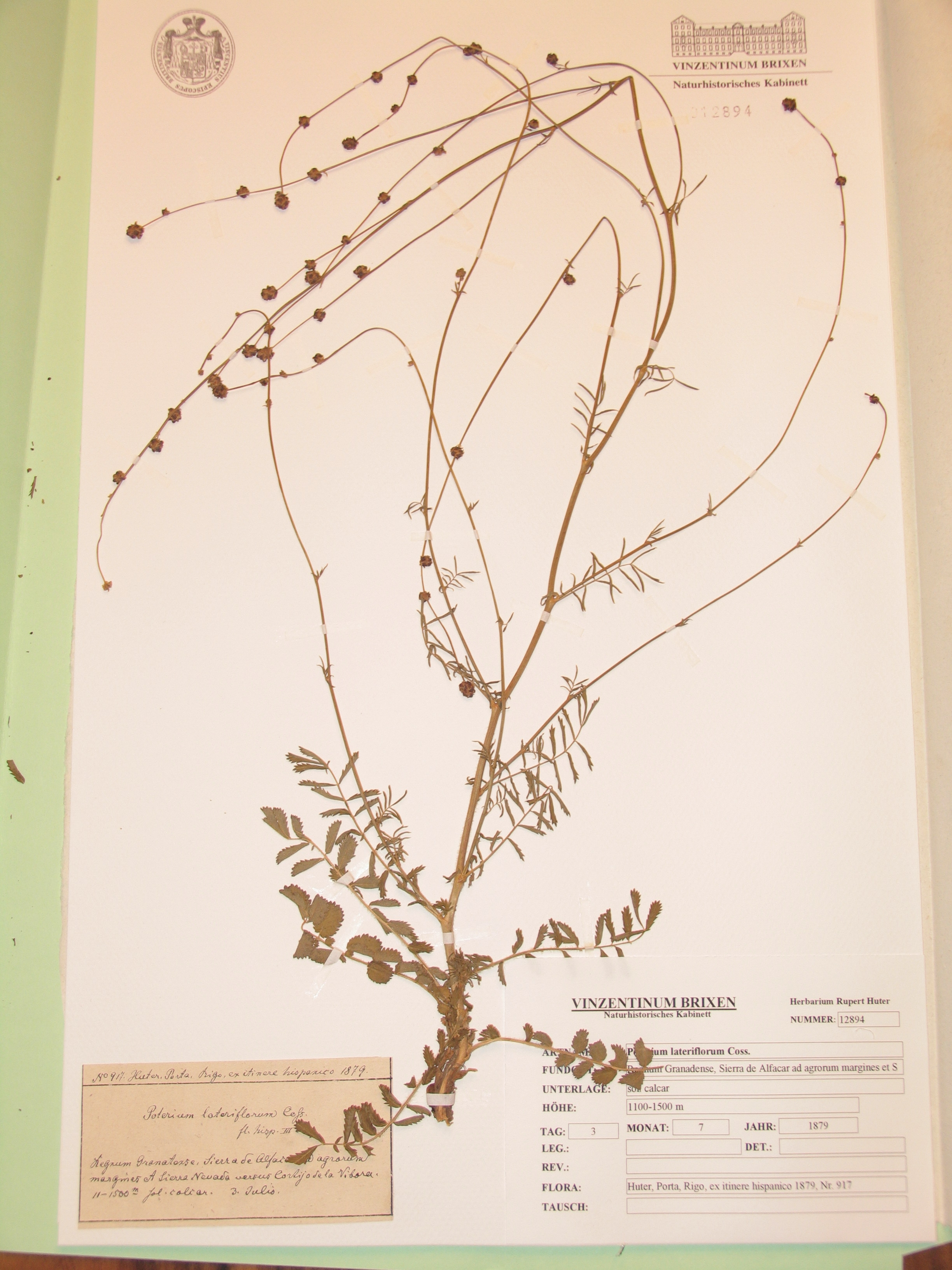
An original Herbarbögen from the "Herbarium Huteri" at Vinzentinum.

With Pietro Porta (1832–1923) and Giorgio Rigo (1841–1922), he participated in several botanical expeditions, including trips to Carnia / Friuli (1873), southern Italy (1874, 1875, 1877), Spain (1879) and the Balearic Islands (1885). Together with them he edited the exsiccata series Ex itinere Hispanico 1879 and Iter III. Italicum. His herbarium of nearly 120,000 specimens was bequeathed to the "Vinzentinum" in Brixen. Of particular interest, are specimens of the genus Hieracium contained within the herbarium.

The genus Hutera (synonym Coincya) bears his name, as do species with the specific epithet of huteri. an example being Ligusticum huteri.

== Associated writings ==
- Flora der Gefässpflanzen von Höhlenstein und der nächsten Umgebung, 1872 – Vascular plants of Höhlenstein and its immediate vicinity.
- Herbar-Studien. Wien Selbstverl, 1908 – Herbarium studies.
- "Die Gattung Hieracium L. (Compositae) im Herbarium Rupert Huter (Vinzentinum Brixen, BRIX) kommentiertes Verzeichnis mit taxonomischen und nomenklatorischen Ergänzungen unter besonderer Berücksichtigung der Typus-Belege", part of the series "Tiroler Landesmuseum Ferdinandeum (Innsbruck); Veröffentlichungen des Tiroler Landesmuseums Ferdinandeum", Günter Gottschlich (2007).
