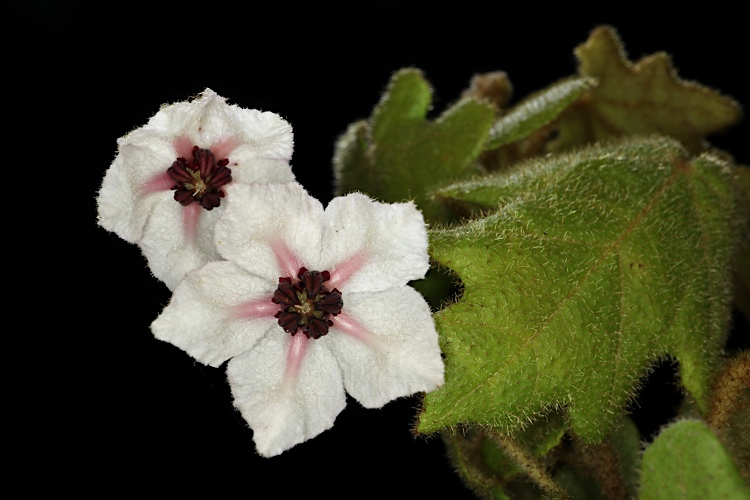

Conservation status
- Priority Four — Rare Taxa (DEC)

Scientific classification
- Kingdom: Plantae
- Clade: Tracheophytes
- Clade: Angiosperms
- Clade: Eudicots
- Clade: Rosids
- Order: Malvales
- Family: Malvaceae
- Genus: Thomasia
- Species: T. solanacea

Binomial name
- Thomasia solanacea (Sims) J.Gay

Synonyms
- Lasiopetalum solanaceum Sims

= Thomasia solanacea =

Species of shrub

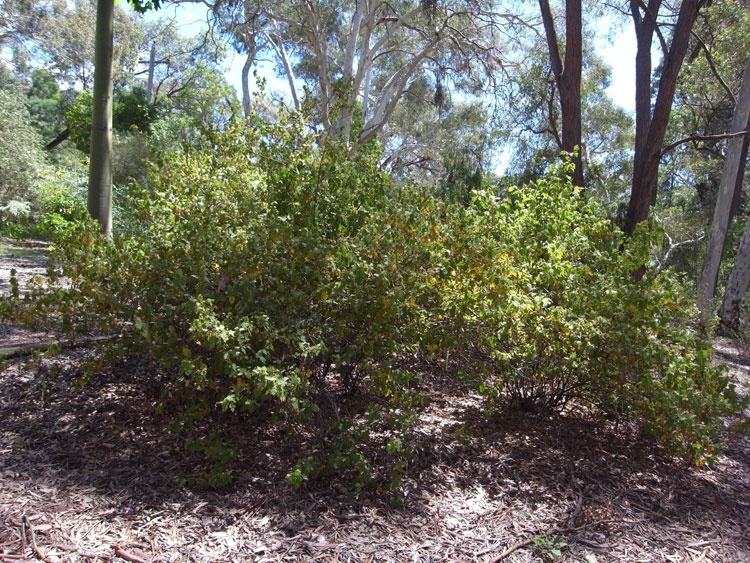
Habit in the Australian National Botanic Gardens

Thomasia solanacea is a species of flowering plant in the family Malvaceae and is endemic to the south-west of Western Australia. It is an erect, bushy shrub with egg-shaped leaves, the bases heart-shaped, and racemes of white, cream-coloured or pink to purple flowers.

== Description ==
Thomasia solanacea is an erect, bushy shrub that typically grows to 0.5–3 m (1 ft 8 in – 9 ft 10 in) high and 2–3 m (6 ft 7 in – 9 ft 10 in) wide, its new growth covered with scaly, star-shaped hairs. The leaves are egg-shaped with a heart-shaped base, 40–90 mm (1.6–3.5 in) long and 20–60 mm (0.79–2.36 in) wide on a petiole up to 40 mm (1.6 in) long with stipules up to 20 mm (0.79 in) long at the base. The leaves have irregular edges and are covered with star-shaped hairs. The flowers are arranged in racemes of 4 to 9 on a hairy peduncle about 40 mm (1.6 in) long, each flower on a pedicel 3–5 mm (0.12–0.20 in) long with linear bracteoles at the base. The flowers are 8–14 mm (0.31–0.55 in) in diameter, the sepals white, cream-coloured or pink to purple, the petals, anthers and staminodes deep red. Flowering occurs from September to December.

== Taxonomy and naming ==
This species was first formally described in 1812 by Sims who gave it the name Lasiopetalum solaceum in the Botanical Magazine. In 1821, Jaques Étienne Gay transferred the species to the genus Thomasia in the journal Mémoires du Muséum d'Histoire Naturelle. The specific epithet (solanacea) means "Solanum-like".

== Distribution and habitat ==
Thomasia solanacea usually grows as an undershrub in woodland and occurs between Denmark, the Stirling Range and Mount Manypeaks in the Esperance Plains, Jarrah Forest and Warren bioregions of south-western Western Australia.

== Conservation status ==
Thomasia solanacea is listed as "Priority Four" by the Government of Western Australia Department of Biodiversity, Conservation and Attractions, meaning that it is rare or near threatened.
