= 3,8-Dihydrodiligustilide =

Chemical compound

Clinical data
- Other names: (3Z')-(3a'R,6'R,3R,6R,7R)-3,8-Dihydro-6.6',7.3a'-diligustilide

Identifiers
- IUPAC name: (1S,2S,6Z,10S,11S)-16-Butyl-6-butylidene-5,15-dioxapentacyclo[9.5.2.0^{1,13}.0^{2,10}.0^{3,7}]octadeca-3(7),12-diene-4,14-dione
- PubChem CID: 102175205

Chemical and physical data
- Formula: C_{24}H_{30}O_{4}
- Molar mass: 382.500 g·mol^{−1}
- 3D model (JSmol): Interactive image
- SMILES: CCCCC1[C@]23CC[C@H](C=C2C(=O)O1)[C@H]4[C@@H]3C5=C(CC4)/C(=C/CCC)/OC5=O
- InChI: InChI=1S/C24H30O4/c1-3-5-7-18-16-10-9-15-14-11-12-24(21(15)20(16)23(26)27-18)17(13-14)22(25)28-19(24)8-6-4-2/h7,13-15,19,21H,3-6,8-12H2,1-2H3/b18-7-/t14-,15+,19?,21-,24+/m1/s1; Key:YTEUTQUNVHWZOR-LGNHLWLRSA-N

3,8-Dihydrodiligustilide is a nonsteroidal phytoprogestogen that is found in Ligusticum chuanxiong. It is a potent agonist of the progesterone receptor (EC_{50} = 90 nM). Another compound in the plant, riligustilide, is also a phytoprogestogen, but is almost 1,000-fold less potent and is very weak in comparison (EC_{50} ≈ 81 μM).

== See also ==
- Kaempferol
- Tanaproget
