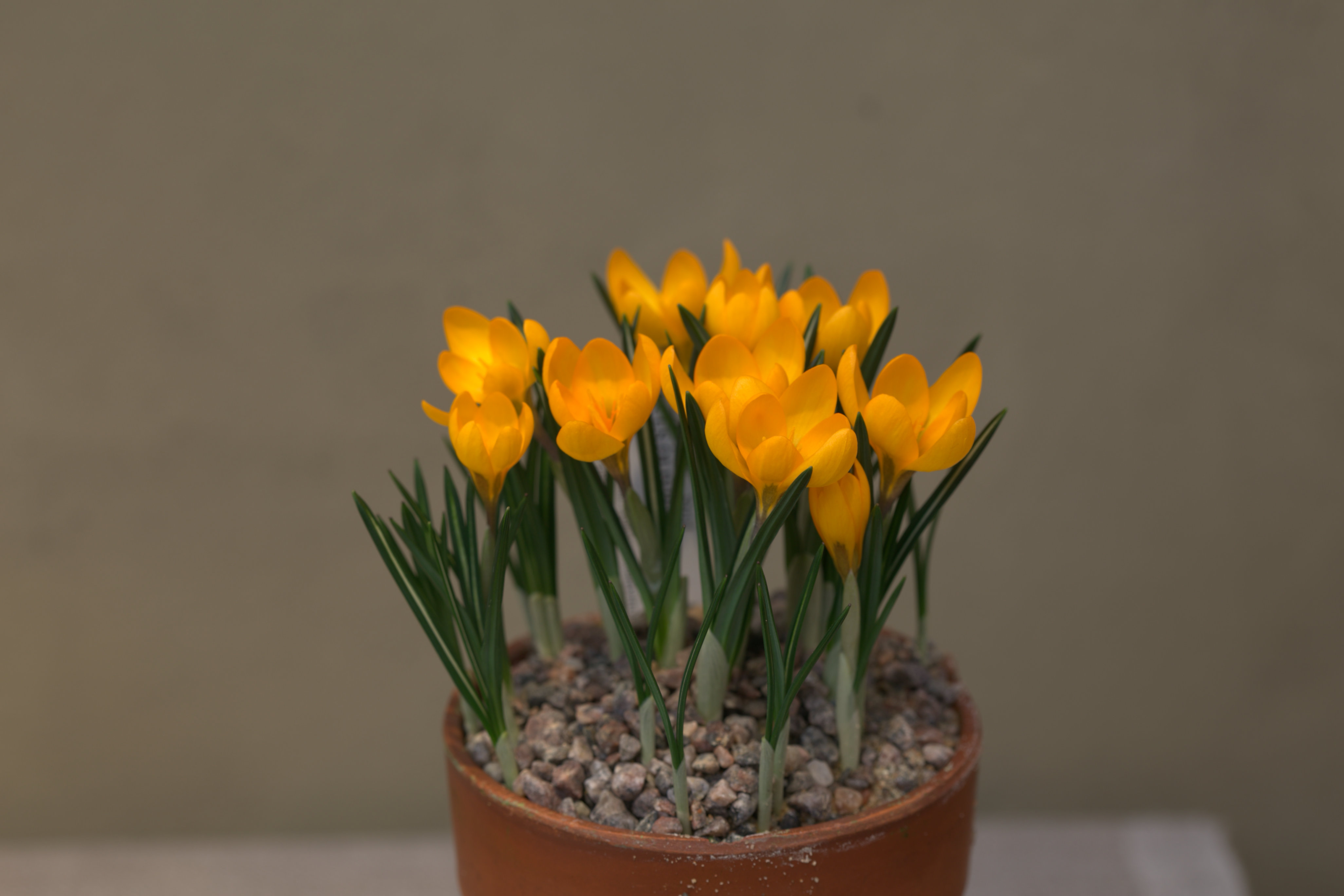

Scientific classification
- Kingdom: Plantae
- Clade: Tracheophytes
- Clade: Angiosperms
- Clade: Monocots
- Order: Asparagales
- Family: Iridaceae
- Genus: Crocus
- Species: C. olivieri

Binomial name
- Crocus olivieri J.Gay

Synonyms
- Crocus lageniflorus var. oliverianus Herb.; Crocus aucheri Boiss.; Crocus olivieri f. balcanicus Kitan. & Drenk.; Crocus sulphureus Klatt; Crocus suterianus Herb.; Crocus syriacus Tchich.

= Crocus olivieri =

Species of flowering plant

Crocus olivieri is a species of flowering plant in the family Iridaceae. It is from the Balkans, Albania, Yugoslavia and Bulgaria to Greece and Turkey.

The species is found growing in deciduous scrub and on open hillsides, or in pine woods from sea level to 1500 meters; flowering occurs in January till March.

== Subspecies ==
- Crocus olivieri subsp. olivieri – Balkan and Turkey
- Crocus olivieri subsp. balansae (J.Gay ex Baker) B. Mathew – endemic round İzmir, West-Turkey. Typically the outside of the flowers are purplish and the styles are divided into twelve branches, unlike the species which has six.
- Crocus olivieri subsp. istanbulensis B. Mathew, Istanbul, Turkey.
