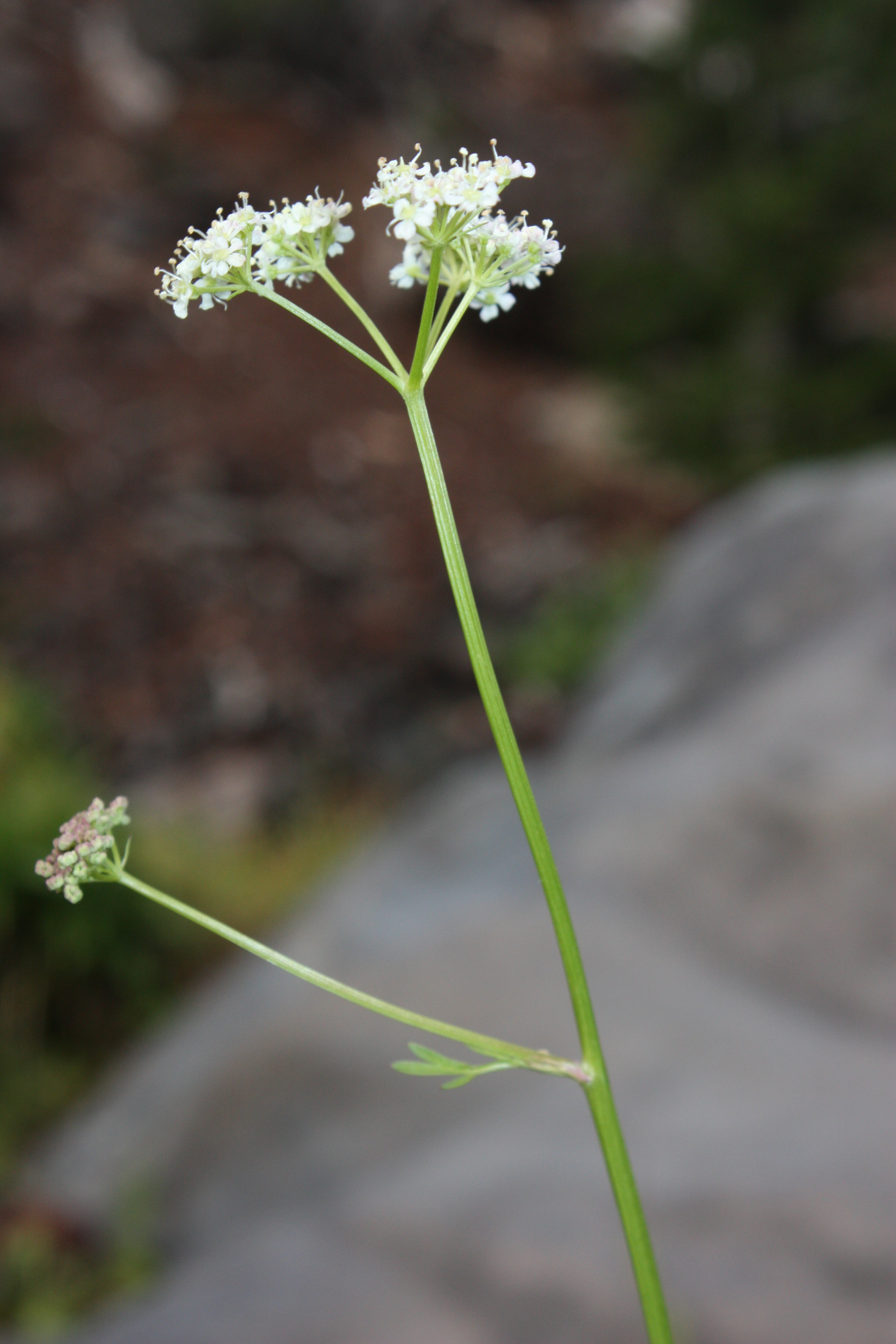
- Ligusticum grayi in Three Sisters Wilderness

Scientific classification
- Kingdom: Plantae
- Clade: Tracheophytes
- Clade: Angiosperms
- Clade: Eudicots
- Clade: Asterids
- Order: Apiales
- Family: Apiaceae
- Genus: Ligusticum
- Species: L. grayi

Binomial name
- Ligusticum grayi (J.M.Coult.) Rose

= Ligusticum grayi =

Species of tree

Ligusticum grayi is a species of flowering plant in the carrot family known by the common name Gray's licorice-root. It is native to the western United States from Montana to California, where it grows in moist, mountainous habitat, such as meadows and forest floors. It is a carrotlike, perennial herb growing from a taproot to heights between 20 and 80 centimeters. The leaves are like those of its relatives, including celery, each divided into several leaflets with pointed lobes. The inflorescence is a compound umbel of many small, white flowers. The Atsugewi used various parts of this plant for medicinal and other uses.

The species could be confused with poison hemlock.
