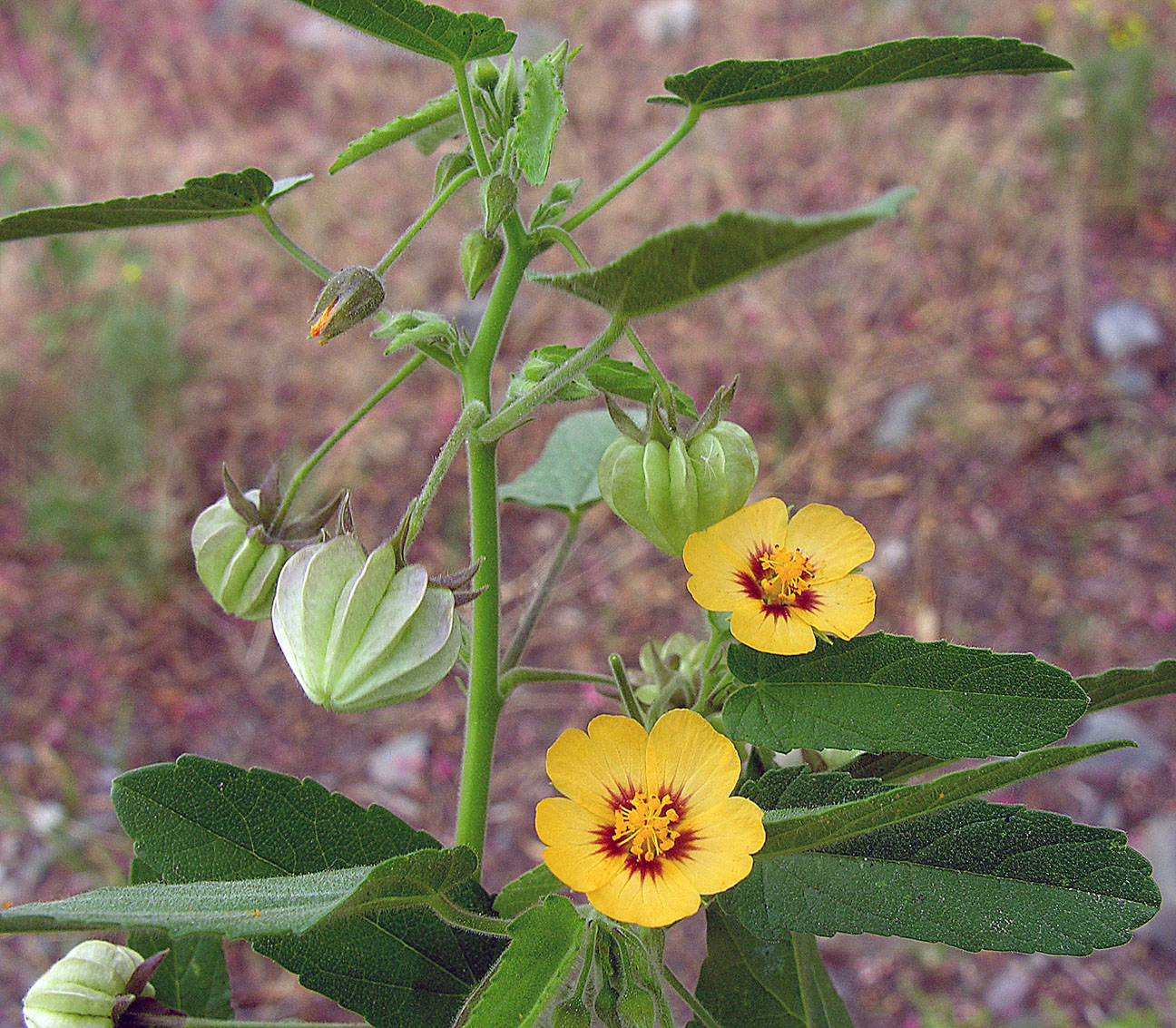
- Gaya parviflora from Mendoza, Argentina,

Scientific classification
- Kingdom: Plantae
- Clade: Tracheophytes
- Clade: Angiosperms
- Clade: Eudicots
- Clade: Rosids
- Order: Malvales
- Family: Malvaceae
- Genus: Gaya; Kunth

Type species
- Gaya hermannioides Kunth

Synonyms
- Philippimalva Kuntze; Tetraptera Phil.

= Gaya (plant) =

Genus of flowering plants

Gaya is a genus of flowering plants belonging to the family Malvaceae. It has been classed in the Malvoideae subfamily and the Malveae tribe.

It is native to Tropical America with its greatest diversity in Brazil (up to 14 species). It is also found in the countries of Argentina, Bolivia, Colombia, Cuba, Dominican Republic, Ecuador, El Salvador, Guatemala, Guyana, Haiti, Honduras, Leeward Is., Mexico, Nicaragua, Paraguay, Peru, Uruguay and Venezuela.

== General description ==
Shrubs or herbs, with toothed leaves, flowers either yellowish or purplish, mainly solitary in the axils, sometimes racemose, with 8 carpels or more, membranaceous, bi-valvate and one seeded.

== Taxonomy ==
The genus name of Gaya is in honour of Jaques Étienne Gay (1786–1864), a Swiss-French botanist, civil servant, collector and taxonomist. It was first described and published in (F.W.H.von Humboldt, A.J.A.Bonpland & C.S.Kunth; Editors), Nov. Gen. Sp. Vol.5 on page 266 in 1823.

== Known species ==
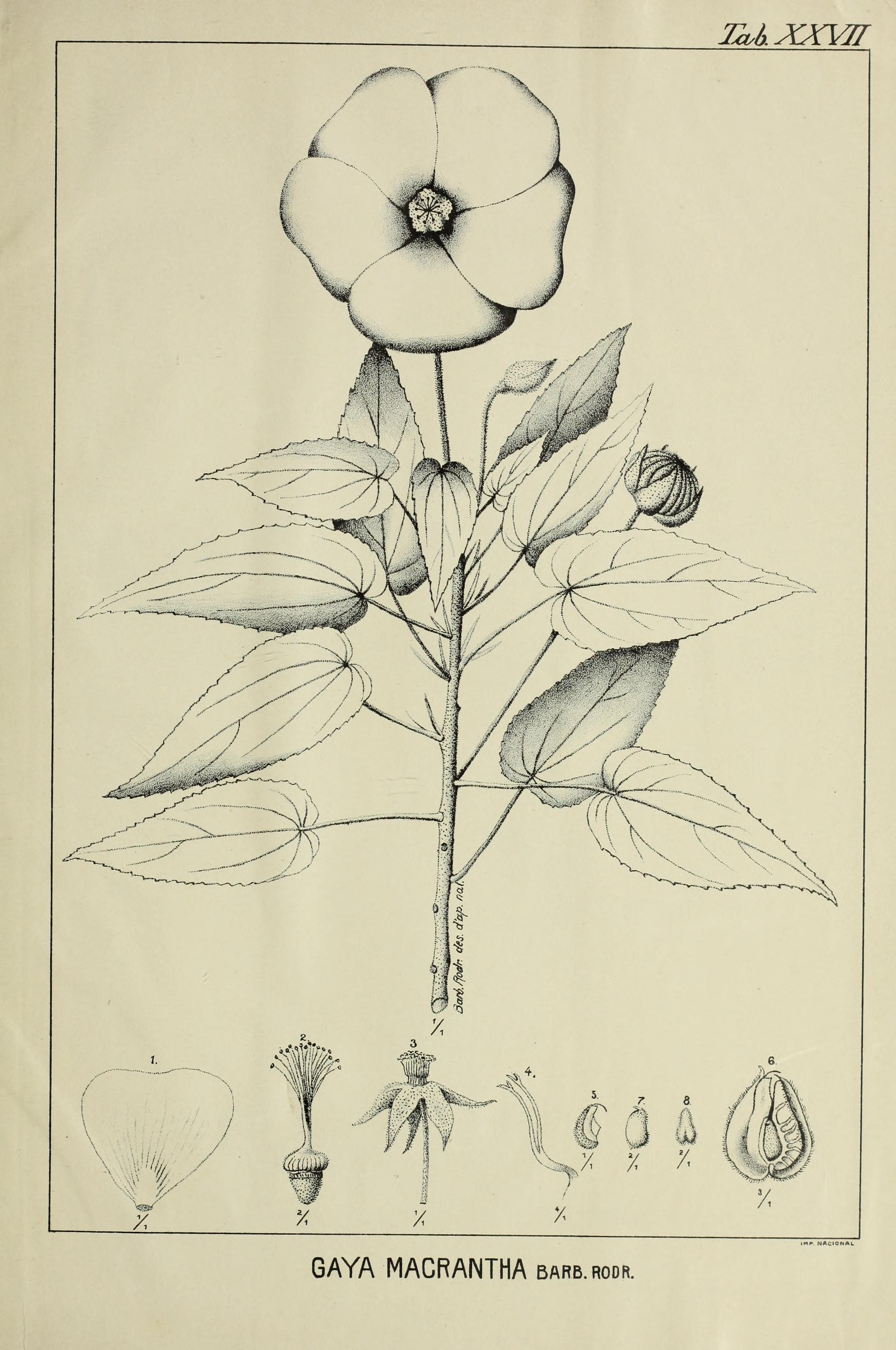
Illustration of Gaya macrantha (1901)

According to Kew;

- Gaya albiflora Krapov.
- Gaya atiquipana Krapov.
- Gaya aurea A.St.-Hil.
- Gaya bordasii Krapov.
- Gaya calyptrata (Cav.) Kunth ex K.Schum.
- Gaya cardenasii Krapov.
- Gaya cruziana Krapov.
- Gaya dentata Krapov.
- Gaya domingensis Urb.
- Gaya endacantha Hochr.
- Gaya gaudichaudiana A.St.-Hil.
- Gaya gracilipes K.Schum.
- Gaya grandiflora Baker f.
- Gaya guerkeana K.Schum.
- Gaya hermannioides Kunth
- Gaya ibitipocana Krapov.
- Gaya kelleri Krapov.
- Gaya macrantha Barb.Rodr.
- Gaya matutina Krapov.
- Gaya meridensis Krapov.
- Gaya meridionalis Hassl.
- Gaya minutiflora Rose
- Gaya mollendoensis Krapov.
- Gaya monosperma (K.Schum.) Krapov.
- Gaya mutisiana Krapov.
- Gaya nutans (L'Hér.) Sweet
- Gaya occidentalis (L.) Sweet
- Gaya parviflora (Phil.) Krapov.
- Gaya peruviana Ulbr.
- Gaya pilocarpa Krapov.
- Gaya pilosa K.Schum.
- Gaya purpurea Krapov.
- Gaya rubricaulis Rusby
- Gaya scopulorum Krapov.
- Gaya tarijensis R.E.Fr.
- Gaya triflora Hochr.
- Gaya weberbaueri Ulbr.
- Gaya woodii Krapov.
- Gaya xiquexiquensis C.Takeuchi & G.L.Esteves
