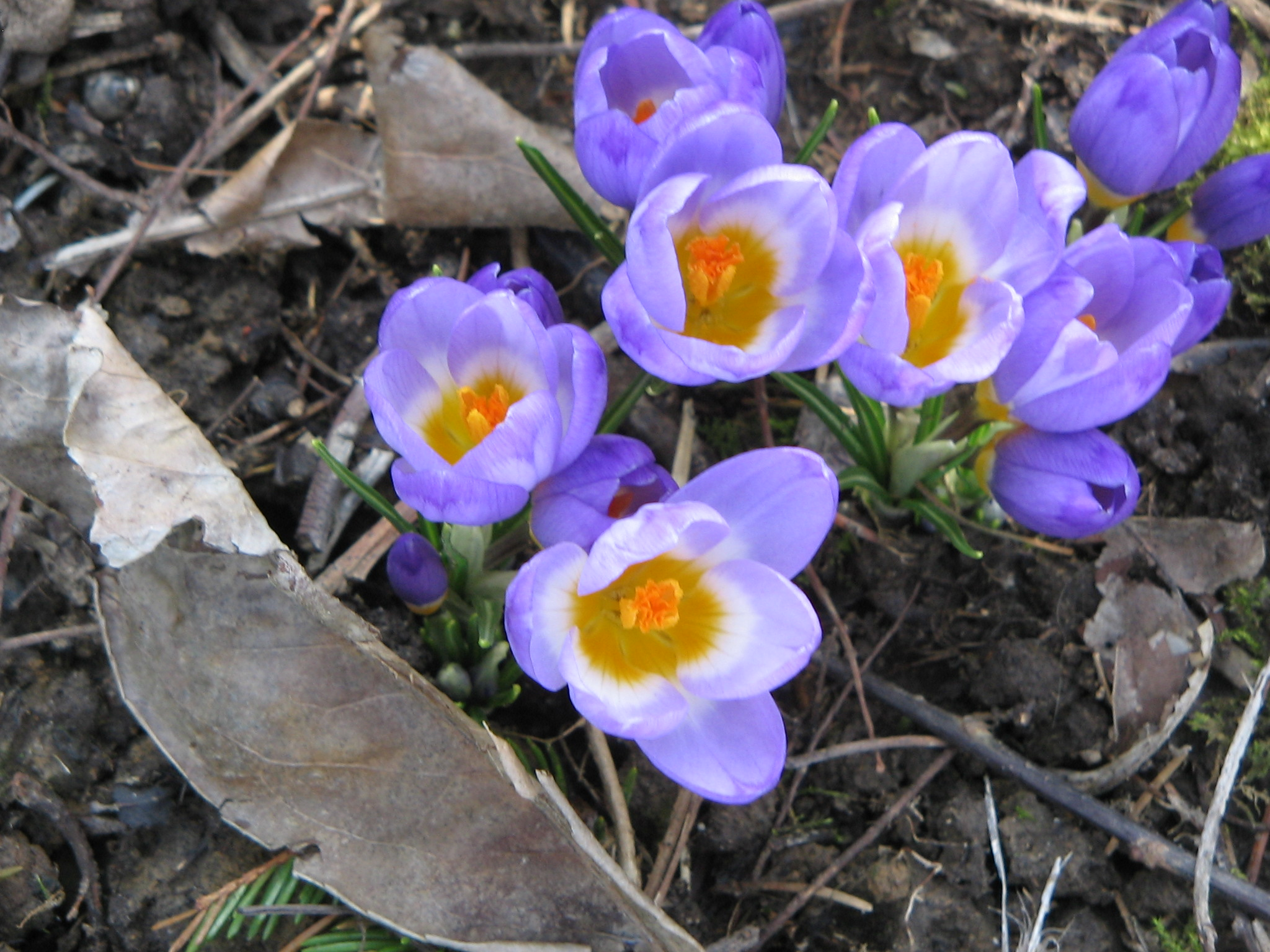
- Crocus sieberi subsp. sublimis 'Tricolor'

Scientific classification
- Kingdom: Plantae
- Clade: Embryophytes
- Clade: Tracheophytes
- Clade: Angiosperms
- Clade: Monocots
- Order: Asparagales
- Family: Iridaceae
- Genus: Crocus
- Species: C. sieberi

Binomial name
- Crocus sieberi J.Gay

Synonyms
- Crocus sibiricus Barr; Crocus sibthorpianus Herb.; Crocus sibthorpianus var. angustifolius Herb.; Crocus sibthorpianus var. latifolius Herb.; Crocus sibthorpianus var. stauricus Herb.; Crocus sieberi var. heterochromus Halácsy; Crocus sieberi var. sibthorpianus (Herb.) Nyman; Crocus sieberi var. versicolor Boiss. & Heldr.; Crocus sieberianus Herb.

= Crocus sieberi =

Species of flowering plant

Crocus sieberi, Sieber's crocus, also referred to as the Cretan crocus or snow crocus (as is Crocus chrysanthus), is a plant of the genus Crocus in the family Iridaceae. A small, early blooming crocus, it easily naturalises, and is marked by a brilliant orange which is mostly confined to the stamens and style, fading through the bottom third of the tepal. It grows wild generally in the Balkans: Greece, especially in the island of Crete, Bulgaria, Albania and North Macedonia. There are four subtypes: sieberi (Crete), atticus (Attica area around Athens), nivalis and sublimis. Its cultivars are used as ornamental plants. Height: 3–4 inches (7.6–10.2 cm).

== Subspecies ==
There are four subspecies of C. sieberi.

- Crocus sieberi subsp. sieberi - Native to Crete: flowering in April. The white flowers with yellow throats stand up to 8 cm, the outer surfaces of the flowers are marked with varying degrees of purple. The branched styles are deep orange or yellow.
- Crocus sieberi subsp. atticus - Native to the Attica region of Greece, it has lilac-blue or violet flowers with yellow throats. The corm tunics are more coarsely netted than the other subspecies. It is found growing in stony areas in the mountains and in woods and scrub areas usually above 1000 meters, with flowering occurring from March to June.
- Crocus sieberi subsp. sublimis - Native to the Peloponnese, southern Albania, North Macedonia, and also found in southern Bulgaria, has pale lilac flowers with pale yellow throats.
- Crocus sieberi subsp. nivalis - Native to the Peloponnese with lilac-blue flowers that have yellow throats.

== Uses ==
Crocus sieberi is cultivated in gardens as an ornamental plant for its flowers. It has also been used as food; in Greece the corms are eaten raw - with the flavor said to resemble hazelnuts. In Turkey, the leaves are eaten as greens.

== Cultivars ==
Examples:

- 'Bowles's White'agm (white with orange centre)
- 'Firefly' (lilac)
- 'Hubert Edelsten'agm is a cross between Crocus sieberi subsp. sieberi and Crocus sieberi subsp. atticus. (outside deep purple with broad white bands, inside pale lilac with orange center)
- 'Ronald Ginns' (pale pink to white petals with dark purple feathering on the outside and a yellow throat)
- 'Tricolor'agm (gold centre, middle white band, outer rich lilac-blue edge)
- 'Violet Queen' (deep amethyst-violet flowers, paler within, with a rich, golden centre)
- Crocus sieberi subsp. sublimis forma tricolor burtt. - from Mt. Chelmos in the northern Peloponnese. Plants are more variable than the cultivar 'Tricolor', with bright lilac flowers that have bright orange throats and a white band.

The cultivars marked agm have gained the Royal Horticultural Society's Award of Garden Merit.

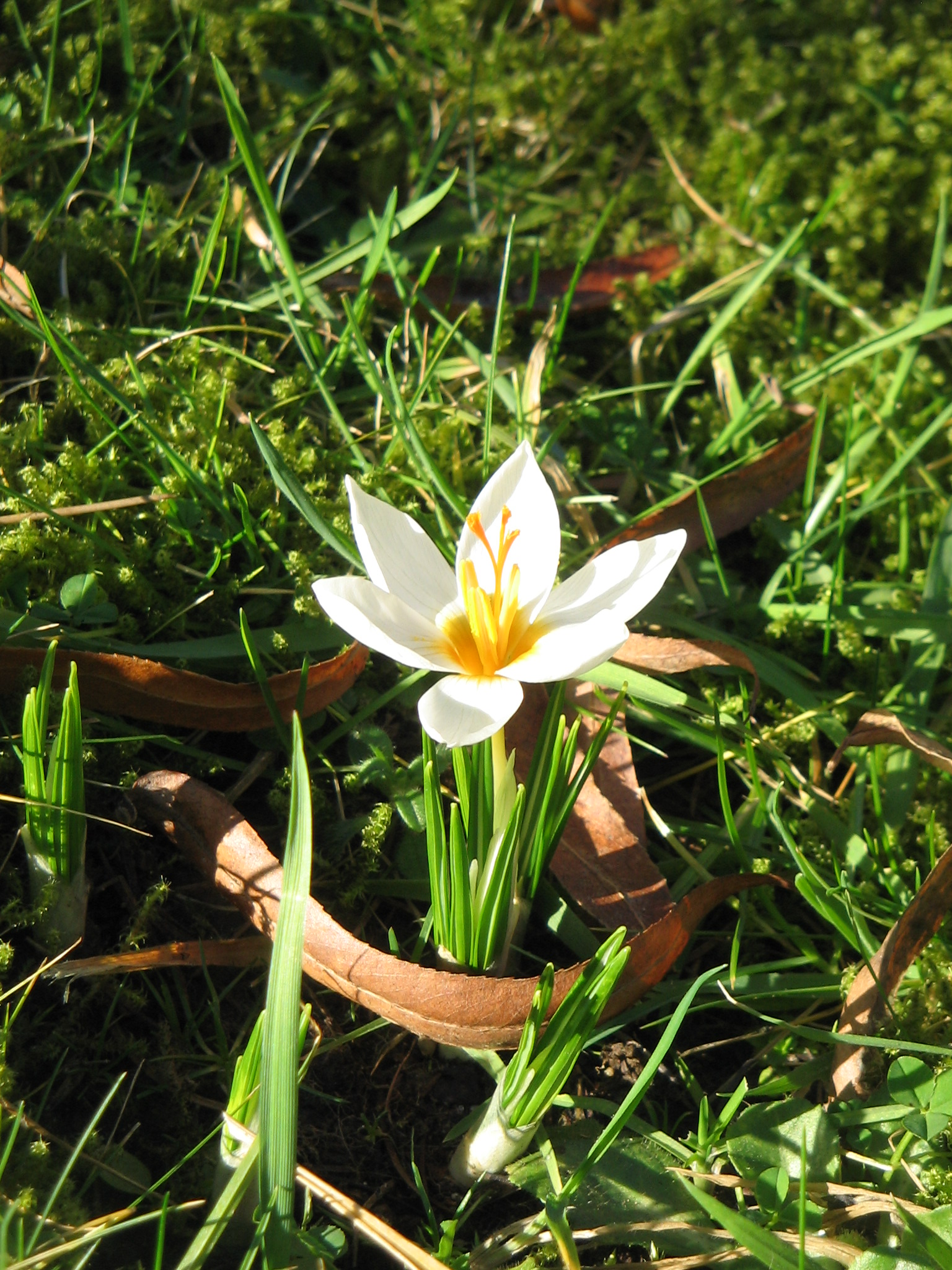
Crocus sieberi subsp. atticus 'Bowles White'

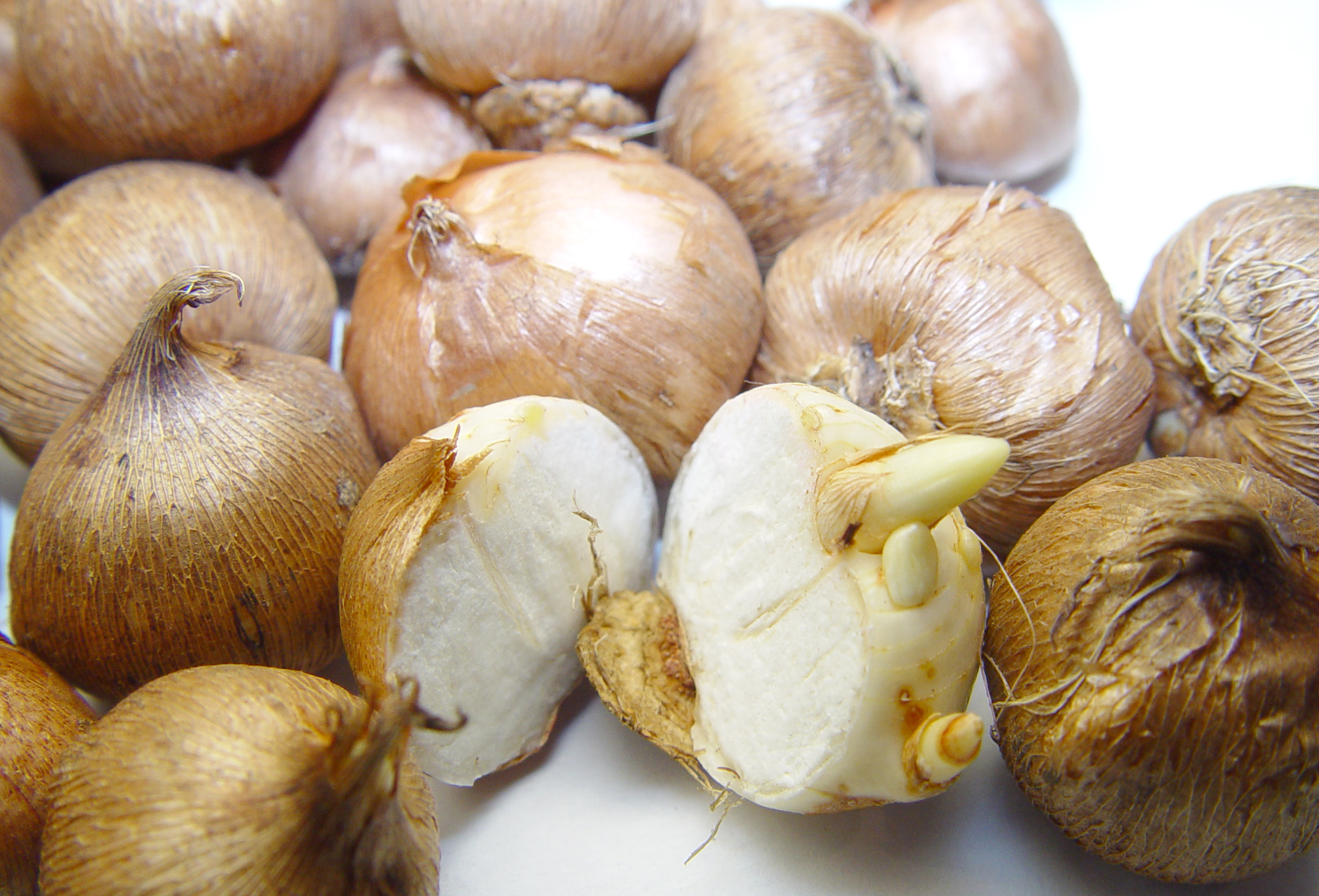
Crocus sieberi corms
