= Riligustilide =

Names
- IUPAC name (3S,3′Z,5′aR,6′S,7′aS)-3′-Butylidene-6′-propylspiro[4,5-dihydro-2-benzofuran-3,7′-5,5a,6,7a-tetrahydro-4H-cyclobuta[g][2]benzofuran]-1,1′-dione

Identifiers
CAS Number	89354-45-0
3D model (JSmol)	Interactive image
ChemSpider	4946720
PubChem CID	6442656
UNII	6GB38T262B
CompTox Dashboard (EPA)	DTXSID101337087
- InChI: InChI=1S/C24H28O4/c1-3-5-11-19-16-13-12-14-17(8-4-2)24(21(14)20(16)23(26)27-19)18-10-7-6-9-15(18)22(25)28-24/h6,9,11,14,17,21H,3-5,7-8,10,12-13H2,1-2H3/b19-11-/t14-,17+,21+,24-/m1/s1 Key: TYSOMZQRYGBSKN-DRQJQJQISA-N
- SMILES: CCC/C=C\1/C2=C([C@@H]3[C@H](CC2)[C@@H]([C@@]34C5=C(C=CCC5)C(=O)O4)CCC)C(=O)O1

Properties
Chemical formula	C_{24}H_{28}O_{4}
Molar mass	380.484 g·mol^{−1}
- Except where otherwise noted, data are given for materials in their standard state (at 25 °C [77 °F], 100 kPa). Infobox references

Riligustilide is a nonsteroidal phytoprogestogen that is found in Ligusticum chuanxiong. It is a very weak agonist of the progesterone receptor (EC_{50} ≈ 81 μM). Another compound in the plant, 3,8-dihydrodiligustilide, is also a phytoprogestogen, but is almost 1,000-fold more potent in comparison (EC_{50} = 90 nM).

== See also ==
- Kaempferol
- Tanaproget
