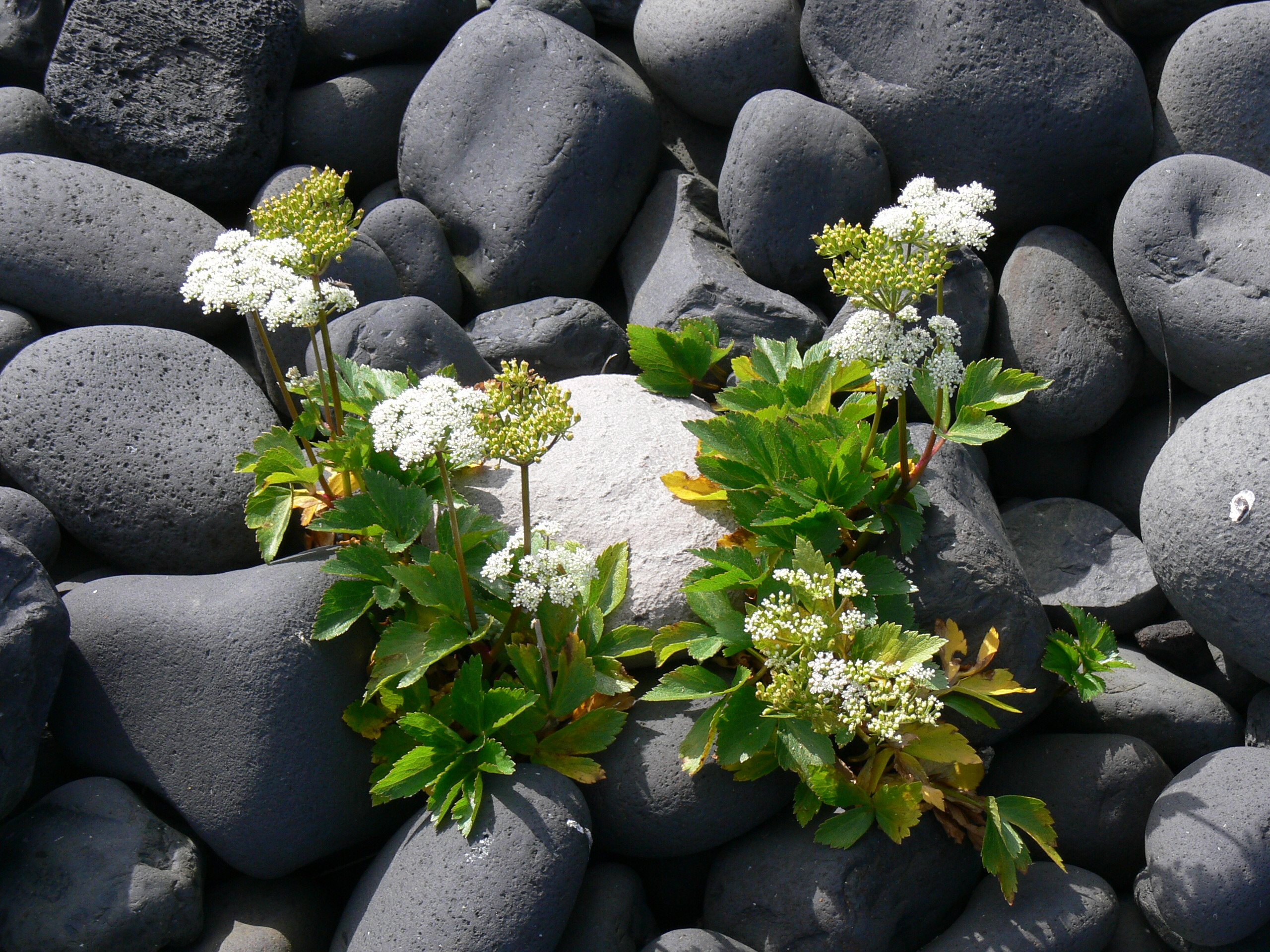
- Ligusticum scoticum on a beach in Iceland

Conservation status
- Least Concern (IUCN 3.1)

Scientific classification
- Kingdom: Plantae
- Clade: Tracheophytes
- Clade: Angiosperms
- Clade: Eudicots
- Clade: Asterids
- Order: Apiales
- Family: Apiaceae
- Genus: Ligusticum
- Species: L. scoticum

Binomial name
- Ligusticum scoticum L.

Synonyms
- Ligusticum scothicum L.; Haloscias scoticum (L.) Fr.

= Ligusticum scoticum =

Species of flowering plant in the celery family

Ligusticum scoticum, known as Scots lovage, or Scottish licorice-root, is a perennial flowering plant in the celery family, Apiaceae. It grows up to 60 centimetres (24 in) tall and is found in rock crevices and cliff-top grassland. It is closely related to, and possibly conspecific with, Ligusticum hultenii from the coast of the northern Pacific Ocean.

Scots lovage is found near the coasts of northern Europe and north-eastern North America. The plant is edible and contains the compound sotolon, which is also present in fenugreek. The leaves have a flavour similar to parsley or celery, while the seeds taste similar to fenugreek or cumin.

== Description ==
Ligusticum scoticum is a herbaceous perennial plant which typically grows 15–60 centimetres (6–23 1/2 in) tall. It has triangular, twice-ternate leaves, 5–20 cm (2–7 7/8 in) long, with each lobe 2–5 cm (3/4–2 in) long. The edges of the leaves may be toothed, lobed or serrated, and are typically either a paler green or magenta. The stem branches infrequently, and bears 2–5 inflorescences, each of which is a compound umbel 4–6 cm (1 1/2–2 1/4 in) in diameter. There are typically 8–12 rays in both the primary and secondary umbels. Each individual flower is around 2 mm (1/16 in) in diameter and greenish-white in colour The fruit are 4–6 mm (3/16–1/4 in) long, with five prominent ridges on each carpel.

Ligusticum scoticum tastes and smells like parsley or celery.

== Taxonomy ==
Ligusticum scoticum was first described by Carl Linnaeus in his 1753 work Species Plantarum. He originally used the epithet scothicum, and this is used by many authors in North America; in Europe, the amended spelling scoticum is used.

== Distribution ==
Ligusticum scoticum is primarily an Arctic plant, with a disjunct range extending from northern Norway to the more northerly shores of the British Isles, and from western Greenland to New England. A related species, Ligusticum hultenii, which was described by Merritt Lyndon Fernald in 1930 and may be better treated as a subspecies of L. scoticum, occurs around the northern Pacific Ocean, from Japan to Alaska. The southernmost occurrence of L. scoticum is at Ballyhalbert in Northern Ireland.

== Ecology ==
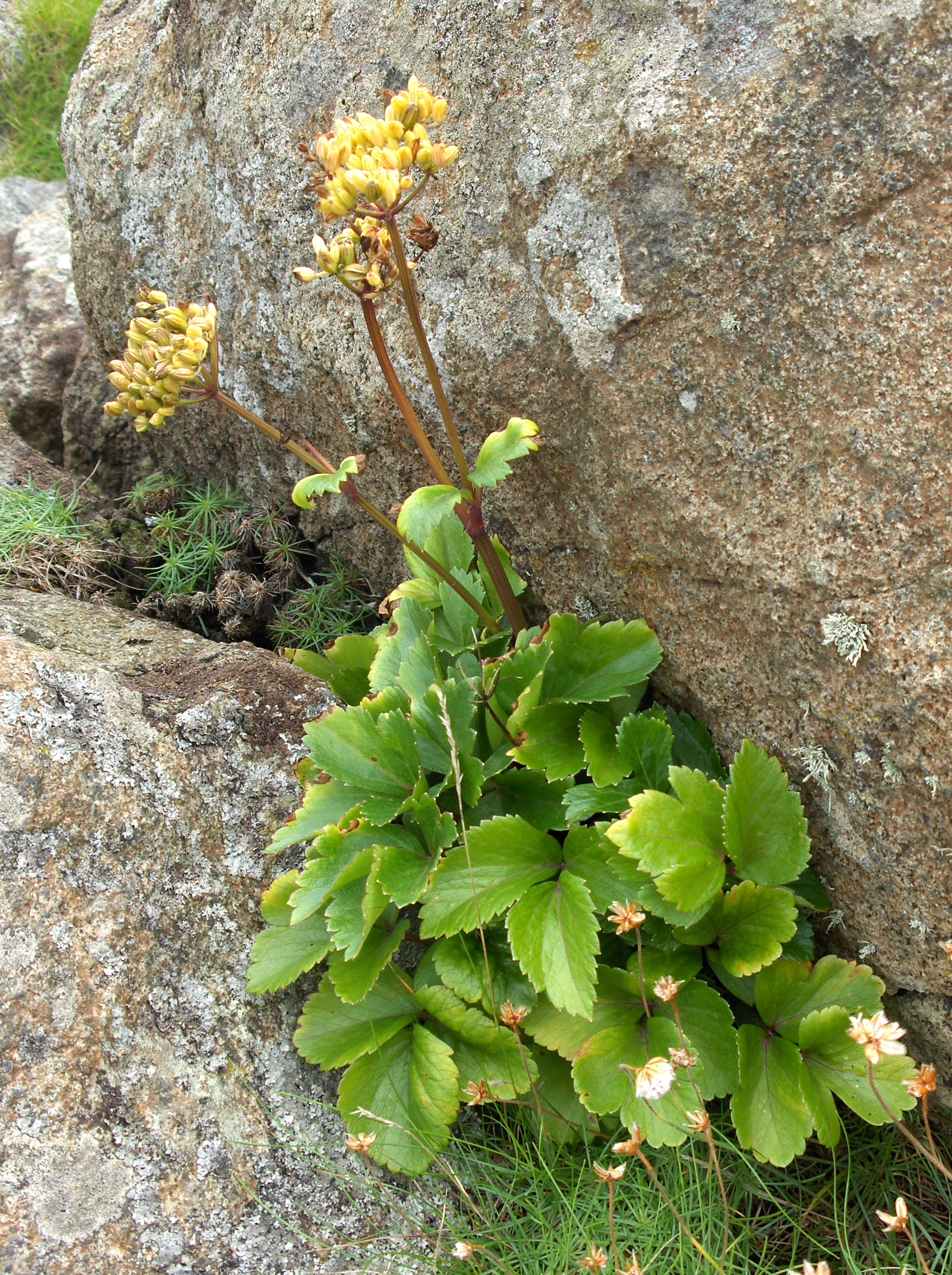
L. scoticum with ripening seeds, Edinburgh, Scotland

Within the British Isles, L. scoticum is only found on coasts where the mean July temperature is below 15 °C (59 °F), and this bound is likely also to apply in other parts of the species' range. Towards the southern end of its range, the plant performs poorly on south-facing sites. It grows in fissures in rocks, where it may be the only vascular plant, and also in cliff-top grassland communities dominated by Festuca rubra and Plantago maritima.

Ligusticum scoticum cannot tolerate grazing, and is harmed by the actions of nesting seabirds; it is therefore rarely found on bird cliffs, or where grazing sheep and rabbits are found. It is, however, tolerant of salt spray, and its growth has been shown to improve when given dilute sea water. The leaves are frost-tolerant, and die back each winter, but regrow very rapidly the following spring. In the British Isles, flowering occurs from June to August, and the seeds are ripe in October or November; the timing is expected to be later at higher latitudes. The flowers are visited by generalist pollinators, mostly flies.

Ligusticum scotiucum is host to the rust fungus Puccinia halosciadis.

== Uses ==
The plant was formerly widely eaten in western Britain, both for nutrition and to combat scurvy. The leaves and stalks are edible before the flowers appear, and contain vitamin A and C. They can be consumed raw or cooked like celery. Additionally, the young shoots can be candied and the leaves can be used to make tea.
