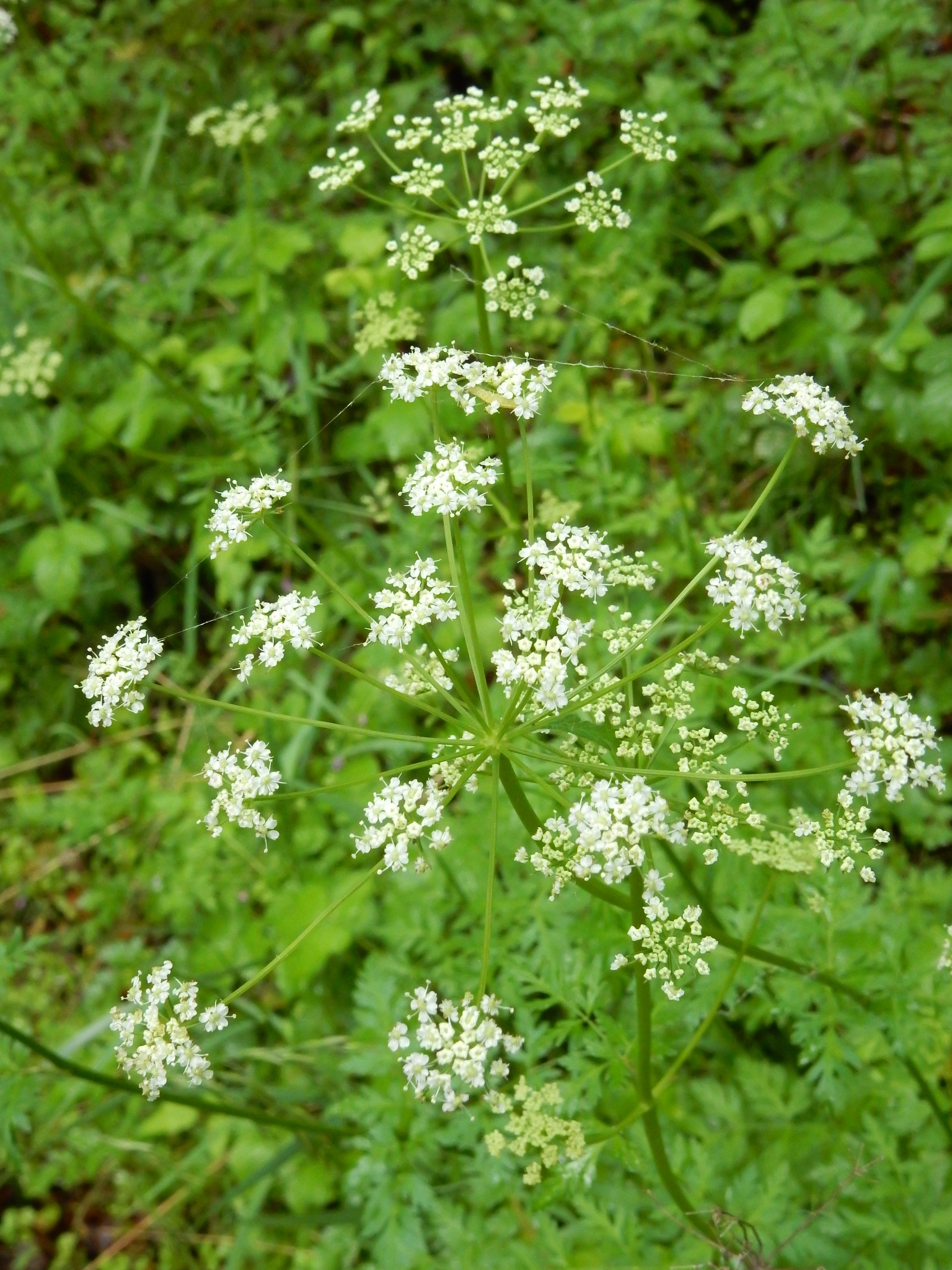

Scientific classification
- Kingdom: Plantae
- Clade: Tracheophytes
- Clade: Angiosperms
- Clade: Eudicots
- Clade: Asterids
- Order: Apiales
- Family: Apiaceae
- Genus: Ligusticum
- Species: L. apiifolium

Binomial name
- Ligusticum apiifolium (Nutt.) A. Gray

= Ligusticum apiifolium =

Species of flowering plant

Ligusticum apiifolium is a species of plant in the carrot family known by the common names celery-leafed lovage and celery-leaf licorice-root. It resembles other carrot-like plants, bearing umbels of whitish or brownish flowers.

This plant is native to California, Oregon, and Washington, where it is found in coastal areas.
