= Phytoprogestogen =

Phytochemical

Phytoprogestogens, also known as phytoprogestins, are phytochemicals (that is, naturally occurring, plant-derived chemicals) with progestogenic effects.

Relative to their phytoestrogen counterparts, phytoprogestogens are rare. However, a number have been identified, including kaempferol, diosgenin (found in yam), apigenin (found in chasteberry), naringenin, and syringic acid, among others. In addition, 3,8-dihydrodiligustilide from Ligusticum chuanxiong is a potent progestogen (EC_{50} = 90 nM), whereas riligustilide is a weak progestogen (EC_{50} ≈ 81 μM).
