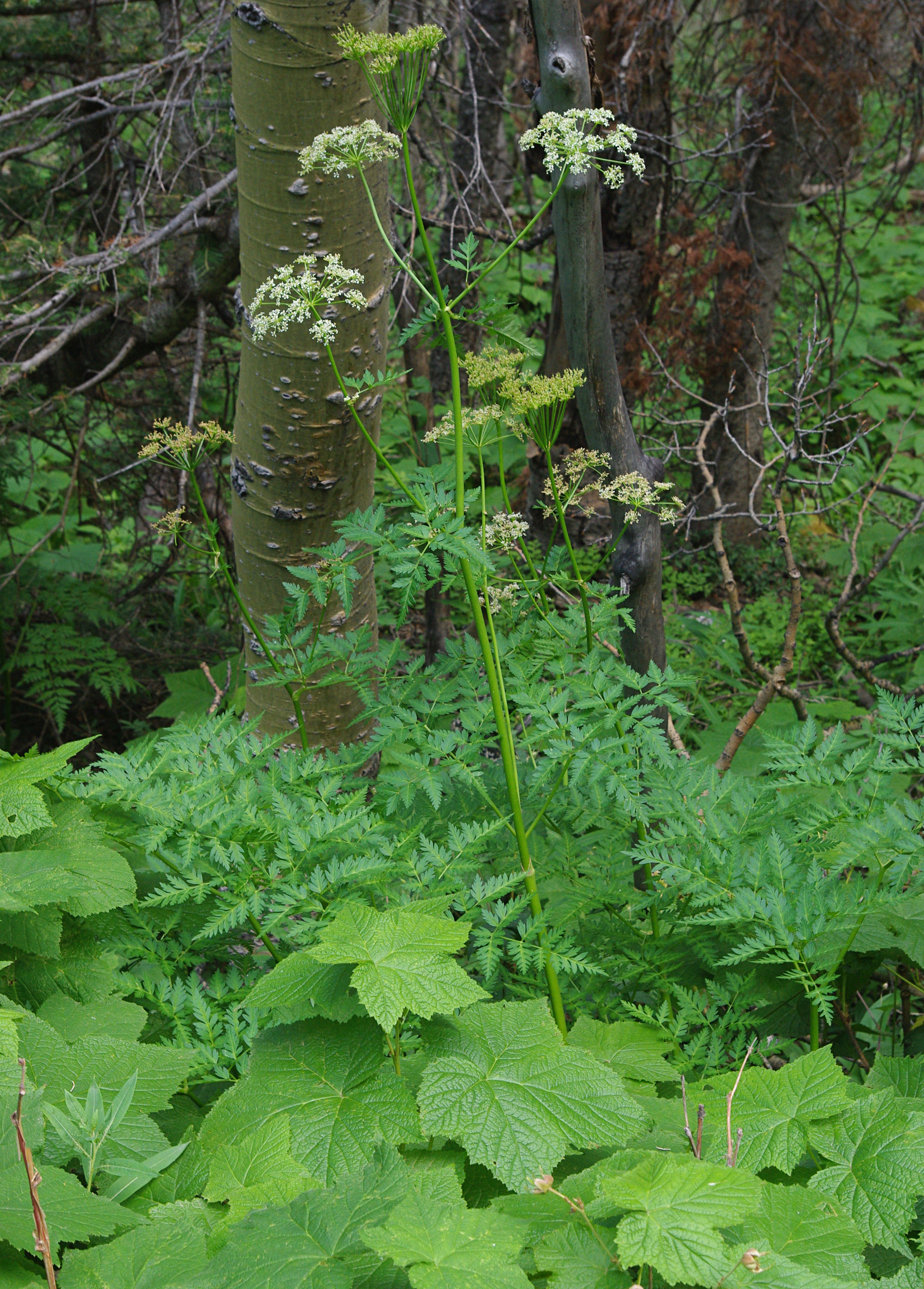

Conservation status
- Least Concern (IUCN 3.1)

- Vulnerable (NatureServe)

Scientific classification
- Kingdom: Plantae
- Clade: Embryophytes
- Clade: Tracheophytes
- Clade: Angiosperms
- Clade: Eudicots
- Clade: Asterids
- Order: Apiales
- Family: Apiaceae
- Genus: Ligusticum
- Species: L. porteri

Binomial name
- Ligusticum porteri Coult. & Rose

= Ligusticum porteri =

Species of flowering plant

Ligusticum porteri, also known as osha (pronounced OH-shuh) or Porter lovage, is a perennial herb found in parts of the Rocky Mountains and northern New Mexico, in the southwestern United States.

== Distribution ==
Osha is strictly a mountain plant, and it is most commonly found in deep, moist soils rich in organic material. The plant requires partial shade. Osha is widely distributed in the Rocky Mountains and the high mountains of northwestern New Mexico. It is most common in the upper limits of the subalpine zone, so in the southern part of its range, it grows at elevations from 7,000 feet to 10,000 feet (2100 m to 3000 m), while in Utah and Wyoming, it grows as low as 5,000 feet (1500 m).

Oshá is dependent on mycorrhizal fungi, and attempts to artificially cultivate the plant outside of its habitat have not been successful. Cultivation in areas where osha naturally grows have been more successful.

== Description ==
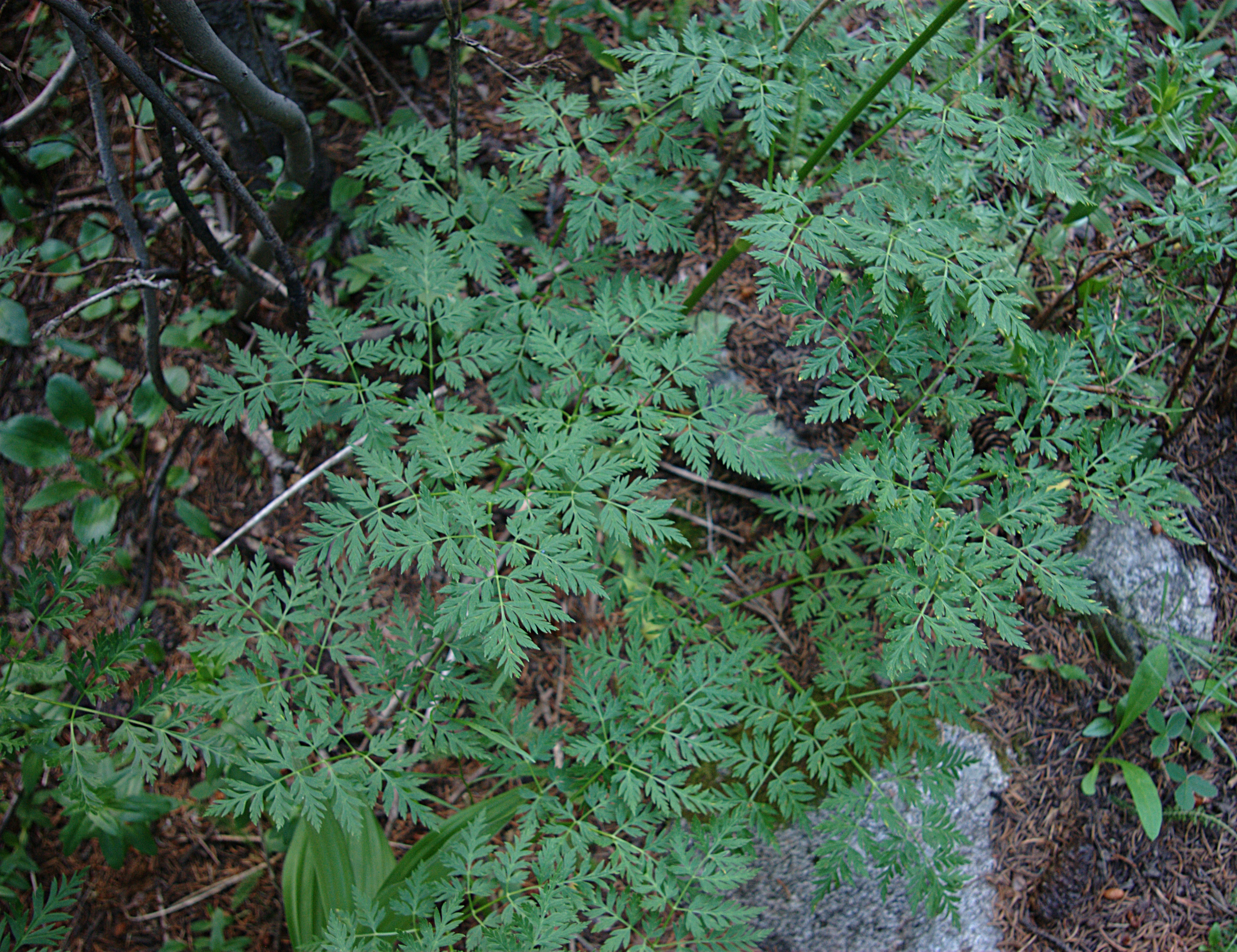

Osha is a substantial plant with one or more stems that usually grow to between 50 and 130 centimeters (20 and 51 in) tall. They are usually branched near their tops and will have several umbels of flowers. Plants are noted for smelling like celery, particularly after frosts. The large roots have a dark brown surface that is hairy and a characteristic odor similar to butterscotch and celery. The interior is yellow with a soapy inner pith.

Plants have the typical appearance of members of the carrot family (Apiaceae), with parsley-like leaves and double umbels of white flowers. The bases of the leaves where they attach to the root crowns have a reddish tint which is unique.

Osha roots have a collar of dead leaf material surrounding the root crowns which is hairlike in appearance. The roots dry very quickly and are very astringent when fresh, and can cause blistering of the mouth and mucous membranes in humans if ingested fresh. The dried roots do not have this astringent effect. Roots of older plants are far stronger and more bitter than those of younger plants.

Osha plants form large clumps over time, and can grow to be very large. In areas of New Mexico, Colorado, and Utah, osha can reach heights of 6 to 7 feet and produce circular colonies with dozens of root crowns growing from a central root mass. Osha is best harvested in the afternoon as the plants are relished by bears, which are known to visit the plants during the morning.

== Similar species ==
Osha can be confused with many plant species in the parsley family. It has been confused with the toxic poison hemlock (Conium maculatum) and water hemlock (Cicuta). Other plants misidentified as osha include hemlock parsley (Conioselinum), mountain parsley (Pseudocymopterus montanus), species in genus Ligusticum, and biscuitroots (Lomatium) especially when young.

Osha particularly resembles poison hemlock, but is easily distinguished from it by its "spicy celery" odor, hair-like material on root crowns, and dark chocolate-brown, wrinkled root skin. Hemlock roots are white and fleshy and thin-skinned; they are typically heavily branched rather than carrot-like, but this is not always the case. Poison hemlock roots have little or no odor; the plants themselves smell "musty" or "mousy", or rank. Osha leaves have an intense fragrance when bruised and are typically larger than those of poison hemlock. Most poison hemlock plants have purple blotches or shading on the lower stem if they are fairly mature, but again, this is not always the case. Unlike its poisonous cousins, osha does not tolerate overly moist soils (because it depends on mycorrhizal fungi) and is never found growing in standing water. Nevertheless, osha and poison hemlock can be found only a few feet from each other.

If the plant is growing near water in consistently moist soil, is tall (0.75–2m), has purple splotches on the main stem, and is heavily branched with small umbels of white flowers, it is probably poison hemlock and should be avoided. In any case, due to the high toxicity of poison hemlock, if a supposed osha plant cannot be positively identified, it must be discarded.

Coniine, the main poison in hemlock species, can be absorbed through the skin. People who have come into contact with these plants, including crushing the leaves to perform a "smell test," should wash their hands immediately and avoid touching their eyes or mouth.

Cow parsnip (Heracleum lanatum, Heracleum maximum, Indian celery, or pushki, sometimes considered a subspecies of Heracleum sphondylium, hogweed or eltrot) is also confused with osha and other plants with similar flower groupings. However, cow parsnip has large, broad leaves and an unpleasant odor.

== Cultural associations ==
According to the ethnobotanist Shawn Sigstedt, who lived and studied with the Diné, a story is told of how the bear gave osha to them as a medicine. In a captive test Sigstedt gave grizzly bears and polar bears osha roots. The bears would chew the roots and rub the mash over their fur. The Diné credit the bear with leading them to the medicine.

== Names ==
The species name, porteri, honors the botanist and Christian clergyman Thomas Conrad Porter (1822–1901).

The common name, osha prounouced OH-shuh (/ˈoʊʃə/) in both British and American English, was reported to be from a First Nations language in early sources, but no likely earlier form has been identified. It is also known as osha root, a name that has been used in English language publications since 1873.

Other common names include Porter lovage, wild parsnip, and loveroot. It is also commonly known as wild celery, but it shares this name with many other species including Vallisneria americana, Angelica atropurpurea, and the wild forms of celery, Apium graveolens. It may also be occasionally known as bear medicine, bear root, Colorado cough root, mountain lovage, wild parsley, and southern ligusticum.

In New Mexico it is called chuchupate by Hispanic ranchers, and this is also one of its Spanish names.

The Akimel O'odham call it jujubáádi. The Rarámuri of northern Mexico call it wasía.

In Spanish it is variously called chupate, chuchupaste, chuchupastle, chuchufate, and hierba de cochino.

== Uses ==
This plant has many uses in Native American medicine. The Zuni use an infusion of the root for body aches. The root is also chewed during curing ceremonies for various illnesses, and the crushed root and water used as wash and taken for sore throat. The Rarámuri also use the root as herbal medicine.

Ligusticum porteri was occasionally used in very large amounts as by Spanish New Mexicans as an abortifacient or emmenagogue. However, researchers George A. Conway and John C. Slocumb were unable to locate any person who reported successful use of this plant for this purpose. The American Herbal Products Association Safety & Labeling Guidelines Subcommittee recommended in 1997 that it should be labeled as not to be used during pregnancy.

=== Conservation ===
Osha is primarily wild collected for the herbal supplement market. This is reducing populations of this plant throughout its range. If harvest continue at current levels the plant is in danger of becoming locally extinct in some areas. In 1999 NatureServe evaluated the species as vulnerable (G3) at the global level. At the state level they rate it as apparently secure (S4) in Wyoming, but vulnerable (S3) in both Utah and Colorado. They have not evaluated the rest of its range. Due to concerns over the species a three year moratorium on harvest from public forests was put in place by the US Forest Service in 1999. This caused the reported US trade in the root to decline sharply. In 1999 the American Herbal Products Association listed the amount of wild harvested osha as 5,200 kg (11,500 lb). The amount taken from the wild increased slowly, but steadily after the lifting of the moritorium, reaching 1,294 kg (2,853 lb) in 2010. The reported harvest reached a post moratorium high of 1,518 kg (3,346 lb) before declining, with a low of 425 kg (938 lb) in 2015 and 2017 reported harvest of 510 kg (1,130 lb). More recently, the IUCN rated it as least concern in 2020.
