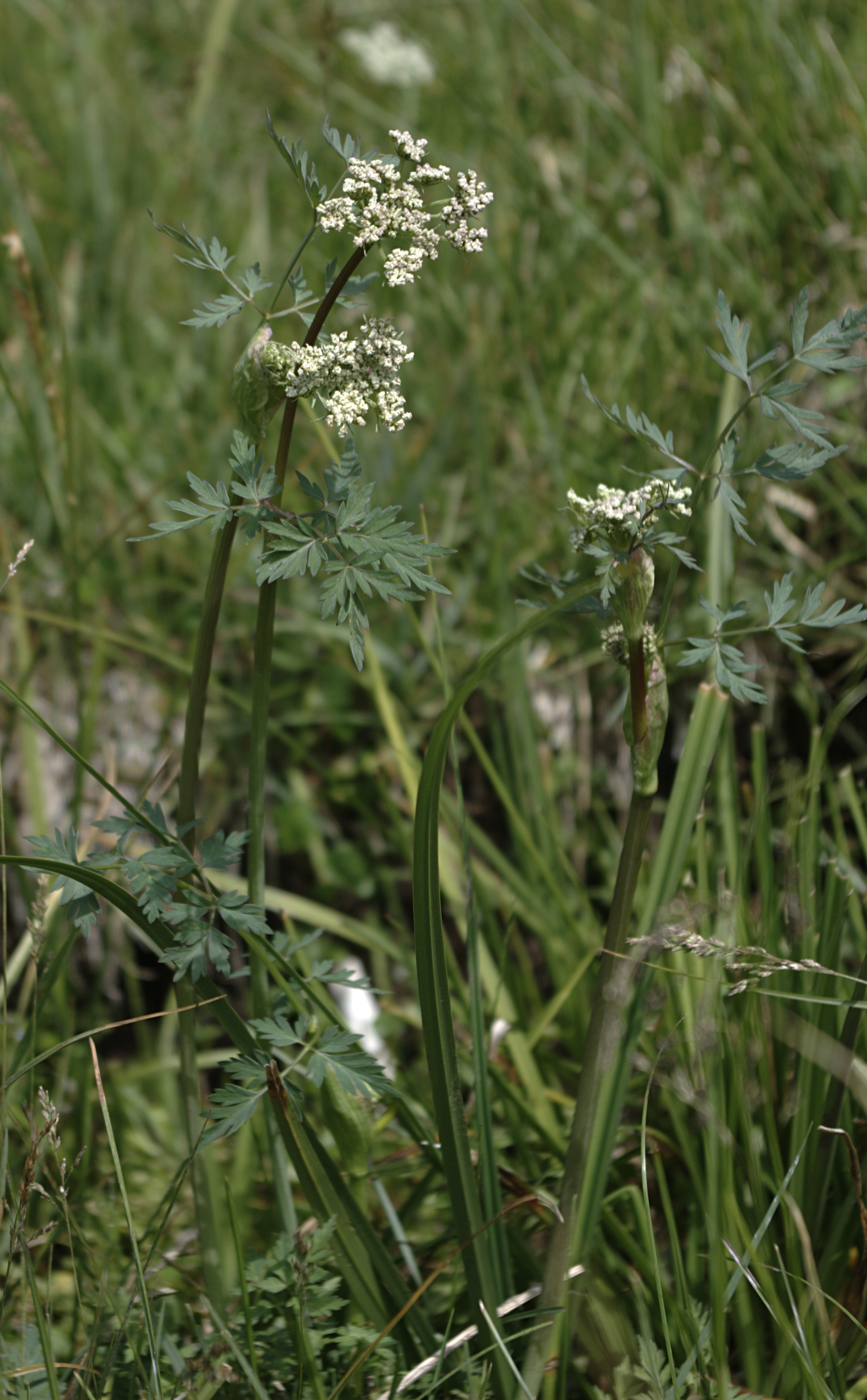

Conservation status
- Apparently Secure (NatureServe)

Scientific classification
- Kingdom: Plantae
- Clade: Tracheophytes
- Clade: Angiosperms
- Clade: Eudicots
- Clade: Asterids
- Order: Apiales
- Family: Apiaceae
- Genus: Conioselinum
- Species: C. scopulorum

Binomial name
- Conioselinum scopulorum Coult. & Rose

= Conioselinum scopulorum =

Species of flowering plant

Conioselinum scopulorum, also commonly known as Rocky Mountain hemlockparsley or hemlock parsley, is a perennial herb found in parts of the Rocky Mountains from southern Montana to Arizona and New Mexico.

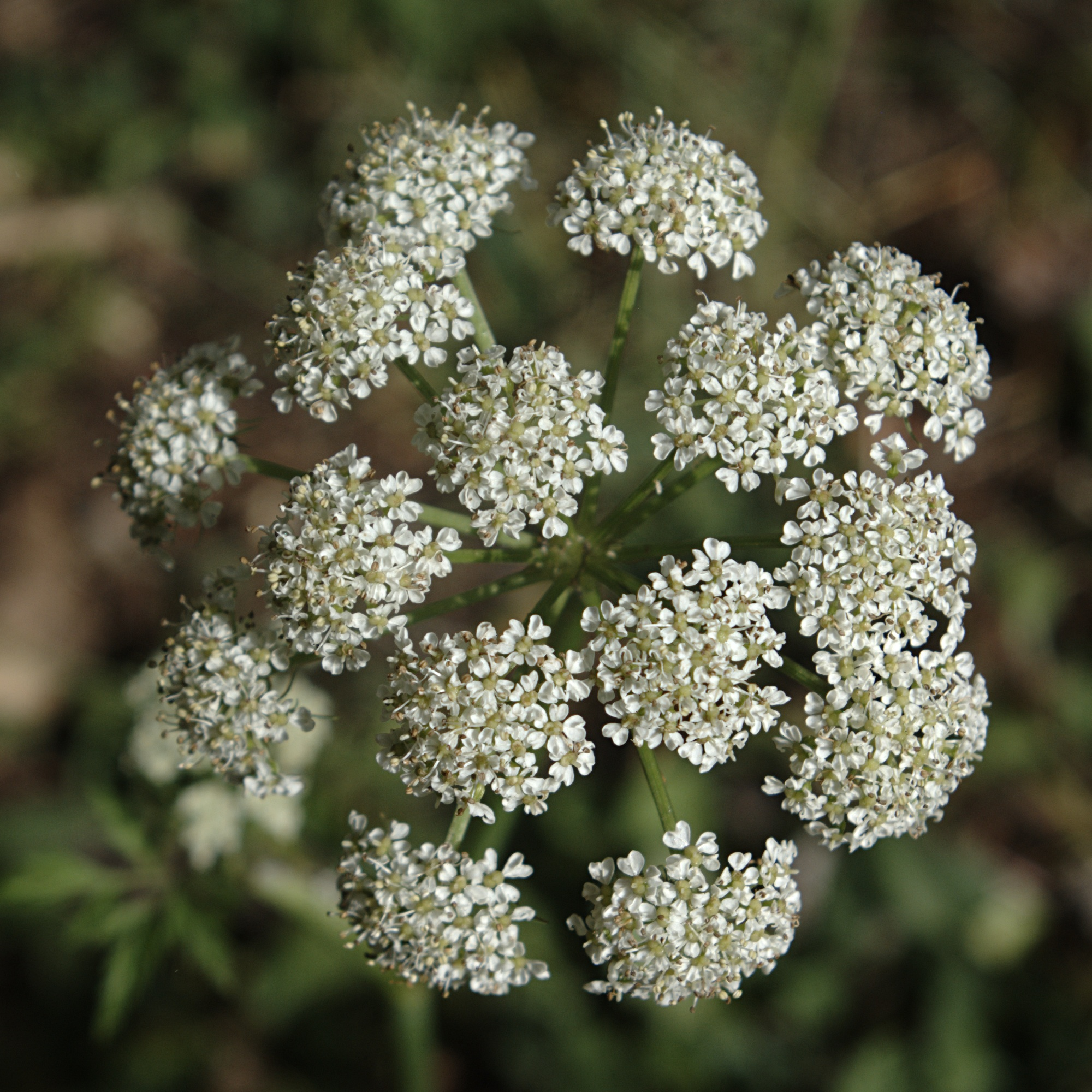
Flower cluster
