= Puccinia halosciadis =

Scientific classification
- Kingdom: Fungi
- Division: Basidiomycota
- Class: Pucciniomycetes
- Order: Pucciniales
- Family: Pucciniaceae
- Genus: Puccinia
- Species: P. halosciadis

Binomial name
- Puccinia halosciadis Syd. & P. Syd. (1919)

Species of fungus

Puccinia halosciadis is a plant pathogen that causes rust on Ligusticum scoticum. It was described as a new species in 1919 by Hans Sydow from a sample collected Breiðafjörður area in the west of Iceland in 1887.

== See also ==
- List of Puccinia species
