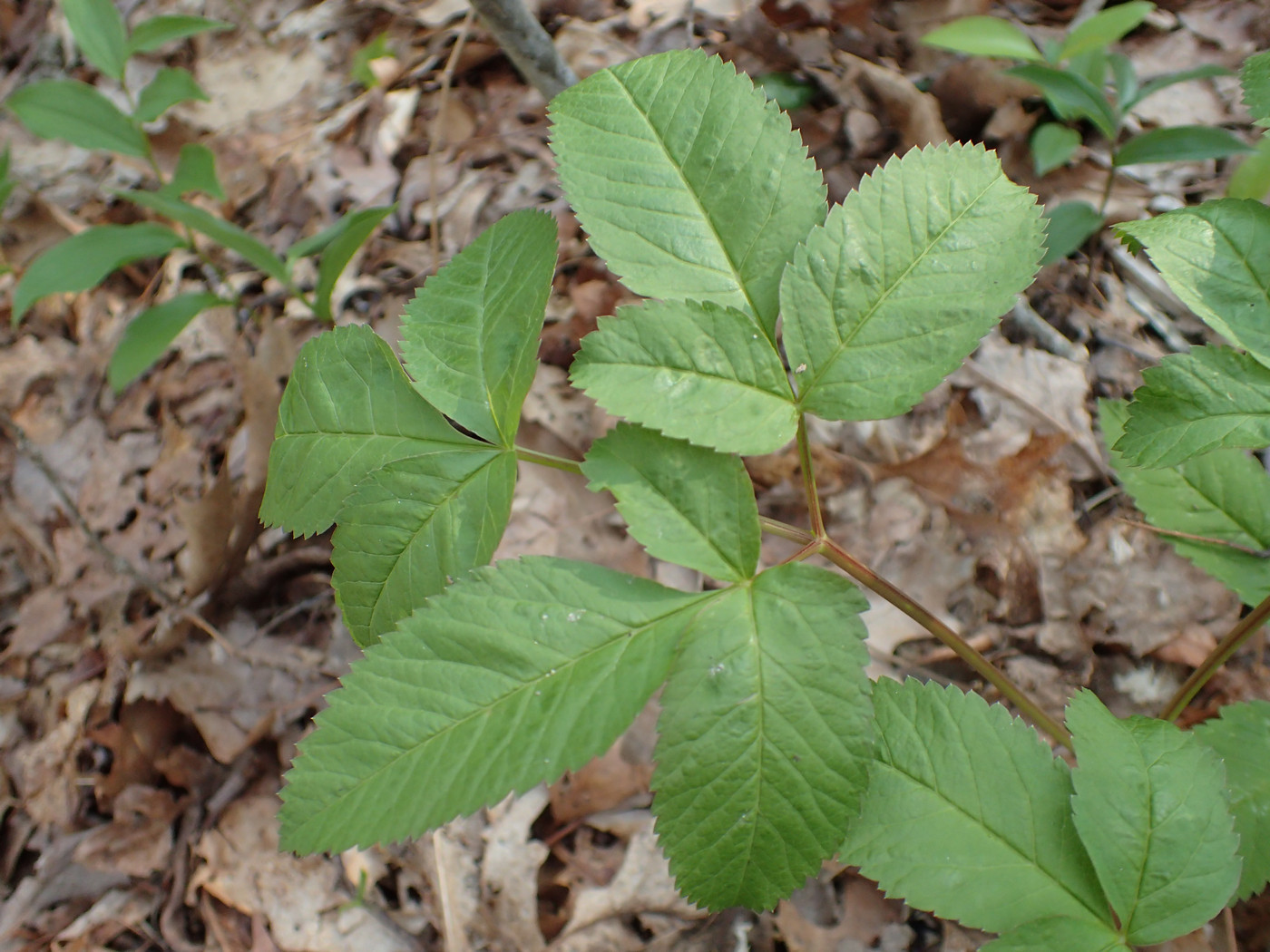

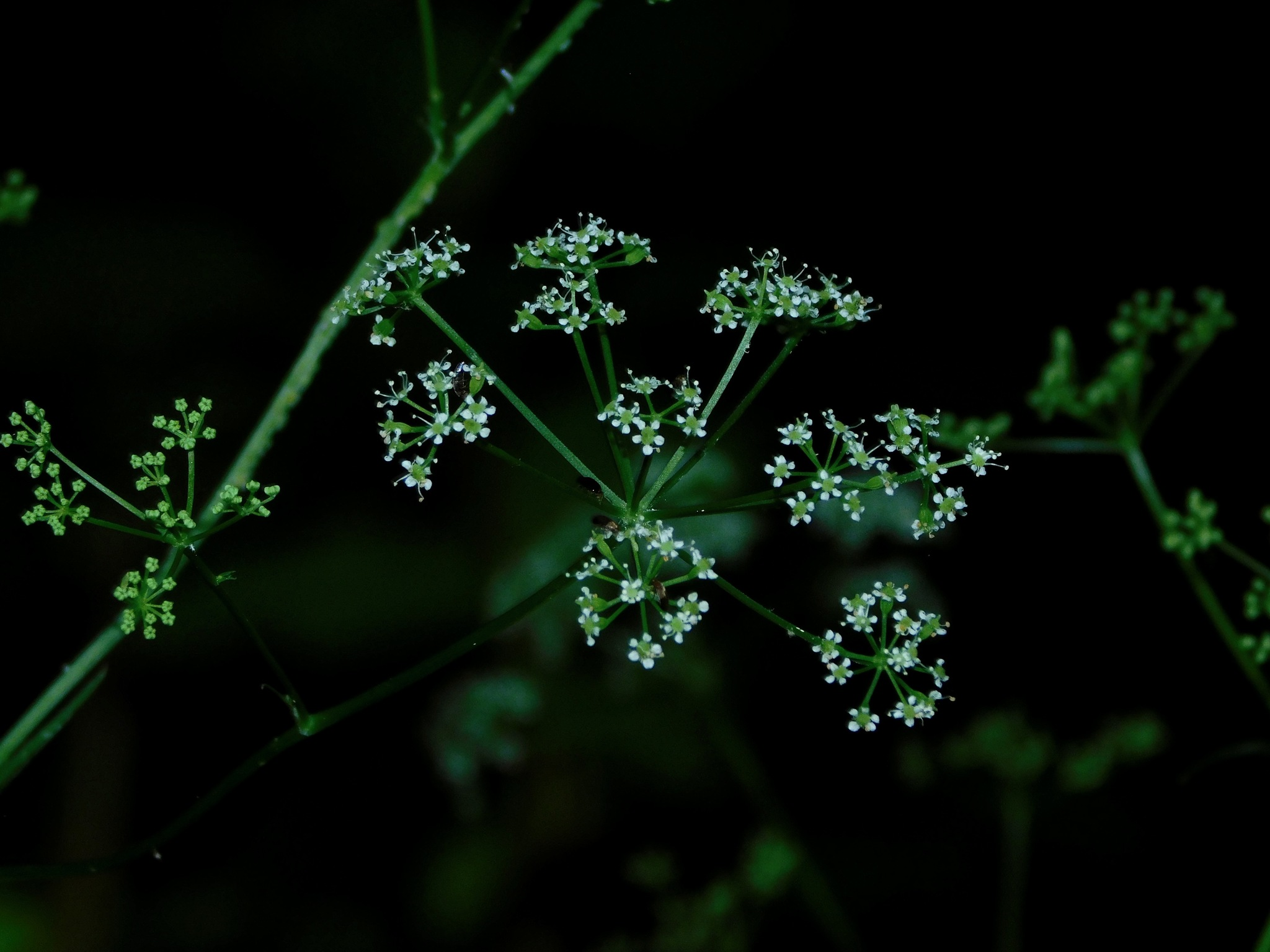

Conservation status
- Least Concern (IUCN 3.1)

Scientific classification
- Kingdom: Plantae
- Clade: Tracheophytes
- Clade: Angiosperms
- Clade: Eudicots
- Clade: Asterids
- Order: Apiales
- Family: Apiaceae
- Genus: Ligusticum
- Species: L. canadense

Binomial name
- Ligusticum canadense (L.) Britton (1894)
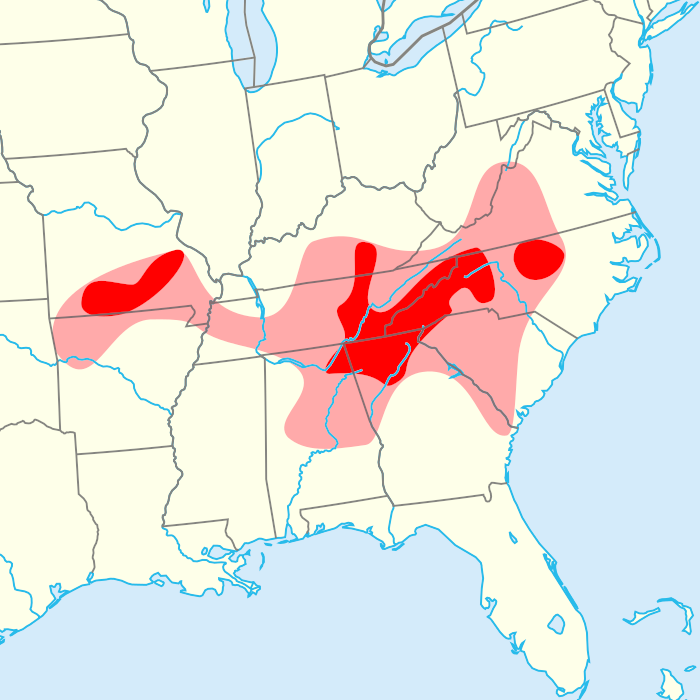
- General range of Ligusticum canadense

Synonyms
- Ferula canadensis L. (1753); Ligusticum actaeifolium Michx. (1803)

= Ligusticum canadense =

American lovage

Species of plant

Ligusticum canadense, known by the common names of American lovage, boar hog root, and Canadian licorice-root, is a member of the carrot family, Apiaceae. It is native to the eastern United States, primarily in Missouri, Tennessee, Georgia, and North Carolina. Despite its name, the northern range of L. canadense remains hundreds of miles south of the Canadian border. It is a perennial herb growing up to 6 ft (1.8 m) tall.
