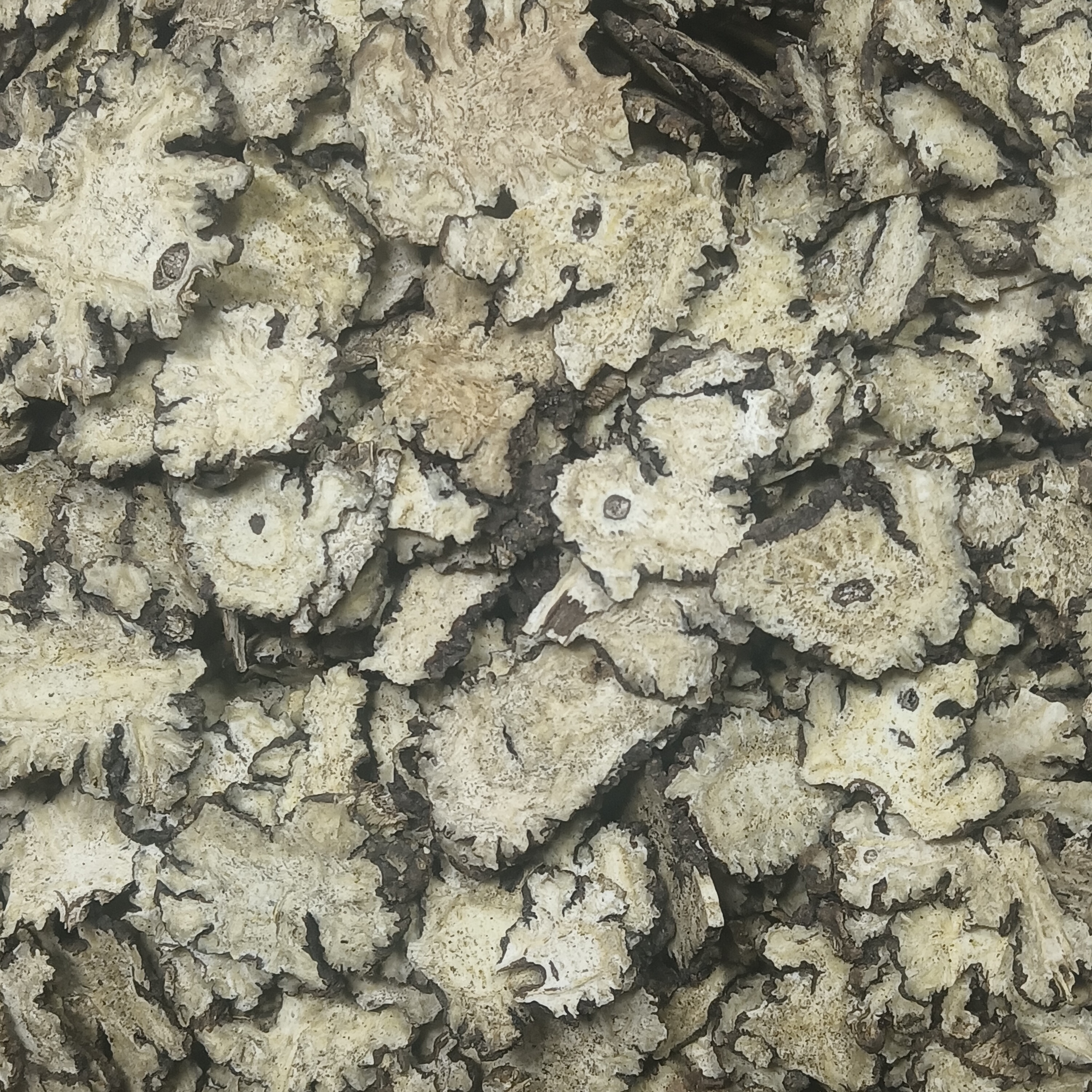
- Slices of "chuanxiong" root and rhizome

Scientific classification
- Kingdom: Plantae
- Clade: Tracheophytes
- Clade: Angiosperms
- Clade: Eudicots
- Clade: Asterids
- Order: Apiales
- Family: Apiaceae
- Genus: Conioselinum
- Species: C. anthriscoides

Binomial name
- Conioselinum anthriscoides (H.Boissieu) Pimenov & Kljuykov

Synonyms
- Homotypic: Carum anthriscoides H.Boissieu; Aegopodium anthriscoides (H.Boissieu) H.Boissieu; Heterotypic: Ligusticum sinense Oliv.; Conioselinum sinomedicum Pimenov & Kljuykov, nom. illeg. superfl.; Ligusticum sinense Oliv. var. alpinum Shan; Ligusticum sinense Oliv. var. hupehense H.D.Zhang; Ligusticum markgrafianum; Ligusticum pilgerianum; Ligusticum harrysmithii; Ligusticum levistifolium; Lower classifications: Conioselinum anthriscoides 'Chuanxiong'; Ligusticum chuanxiong S.H.Qiu, Y.Q.Zeng, K.Y.Pan, Y.C.Tang & J.M.Xu; Ligusticum chuanxiong Hort.

= Conioselinum anthriscoides =

Species of flowering plant

Conioselinum anthriscoides, more commonly known as Ligusticum sinense, is a species of flowering plant in the genus hemlock-parsley. It is native to Southern China and is used in traditional Chinese medicine as two separate herbs, both derived from the rhizome and roots of the plant: gaoben (藁本) and chuanxiong (川芎). These two differ by the exact cultivar used; specifically, chuanxiong is derived from the 'Chuanxiong' cultivar only.

Chuanxiong is considered one of the 50 fundamental herbs. It is known by the common name Szechuan lovage. It contains the phytoprogestogens 3,8-dihydrodiligustilide and riligustilide.

== Related plants ==
L. sinense is a widely used heterotypic synonym of this species with its type locality in Hubei. C. anthriscoides has its type locality in Chongqing (originally recorded as "Su-tchuen oriental" by Paul Guillaume Farges, a name given to the Catholic mission in Chongqing).

C. anthriscoides has a cultivar 'Fuxiong' that is triploid. L. chuanxiong is "chuanxiong" named as a cultispecies, now treated also as a heterotypic synonym.

Because there is no chuanxiong plant in Japan, local Kampo practitioners substitute it with Conioselinum officinale (Makino) K.Ohashi & H.Ohashi (=L. officinale Makino). Similarly, traditional Korean medicine substitutes gaoben with C. tenuissimum.

By plasmid genome, their relationship is (author's taxonomy retained):

- - - L. chuanxiong cv. Yunnan
    - L. sinense cv. Fuxiong
  - - L. jeholense
    - - L. officinale
      - - L. chuanxiong cv. Gansu
        - L. chuanxiong
- L. tenuissimum

Despite older sources assigning "chuanxiong" as a synonym of L. striatum = L. wallichii, morphological, karyotypic, and DNA barcode evidence all point to "chuanxiong" being a cultivated form of L. sinense.

== Traditional medicine ==
As mentioned earlier, this species is the source of two separate TCM herbs. These herbs are assigned different meridians. Chuanxiong is considered more valuable than gaoben, and adulteration using gaoben is not uncommon.

It is used in China, with portions of other plants and herbs (such as monkshood and Rosa banksiae) to make a liniment to treat a painful swelling of the joints. According to Chinese sources, it can also be used to treat ischemic strokes, improve brain microcirculation and inhibit thrombus formation and platelet aggregation.

Chuanxiong is popularly used in the traditional chinese medicine space as Suxiao Jiuxin Wan, an oral medication which is composed of Ligusticum chuanxiong and Borneolum syntheticum. It is commonly used as fast acting angina relief as well as a daily use angina prevention medication. Studies on its mechanisms in human vessels suggest that the medication's inhibitory effect on the vasoconstriction in human arteries is mainly mediated by tetramethylpyrazine- the key component of chuanxiong. The main physiological response it produces is thought to be increased production of nitric oxide (NO), which is similar to the mechanism of action of Nitroglycerin, the medicine commonly prescribed for acute angina attacks in western medicine. In studies, this inhibitory effect remained potent when used as a post vasoconstrictor-mediated vasoconstriction (equivalent to acute angina attacks), as well as with pretreatment of SJW (equivalent to daily prevention of angina). The effect with pretreatment using SJW seemed to be more significant than the effect of alternative treatments used in Western medicine for angina patients such as amlodipine and nitroglycerin.

Side effects of SJW seen to resemble other similar medications used in angina prevention, including headache, dizziness, and facial flushing. There is some evidence that usage of SJW can rapidly improve ECG findings in individuals with chronic heart disease. Other small studies on rats suggest that SJW may also have an atherosclerotic effect. No serious side effects have been identified.

Overall, while findings from studies and analyses remain optimistic, trials have so far been small and findings are to be taking cautiously. For now, guideline based care is still recommended as first line, and medications with Ligusticum sinense are to be used as adjunct treatments alongside suggested treatments.
