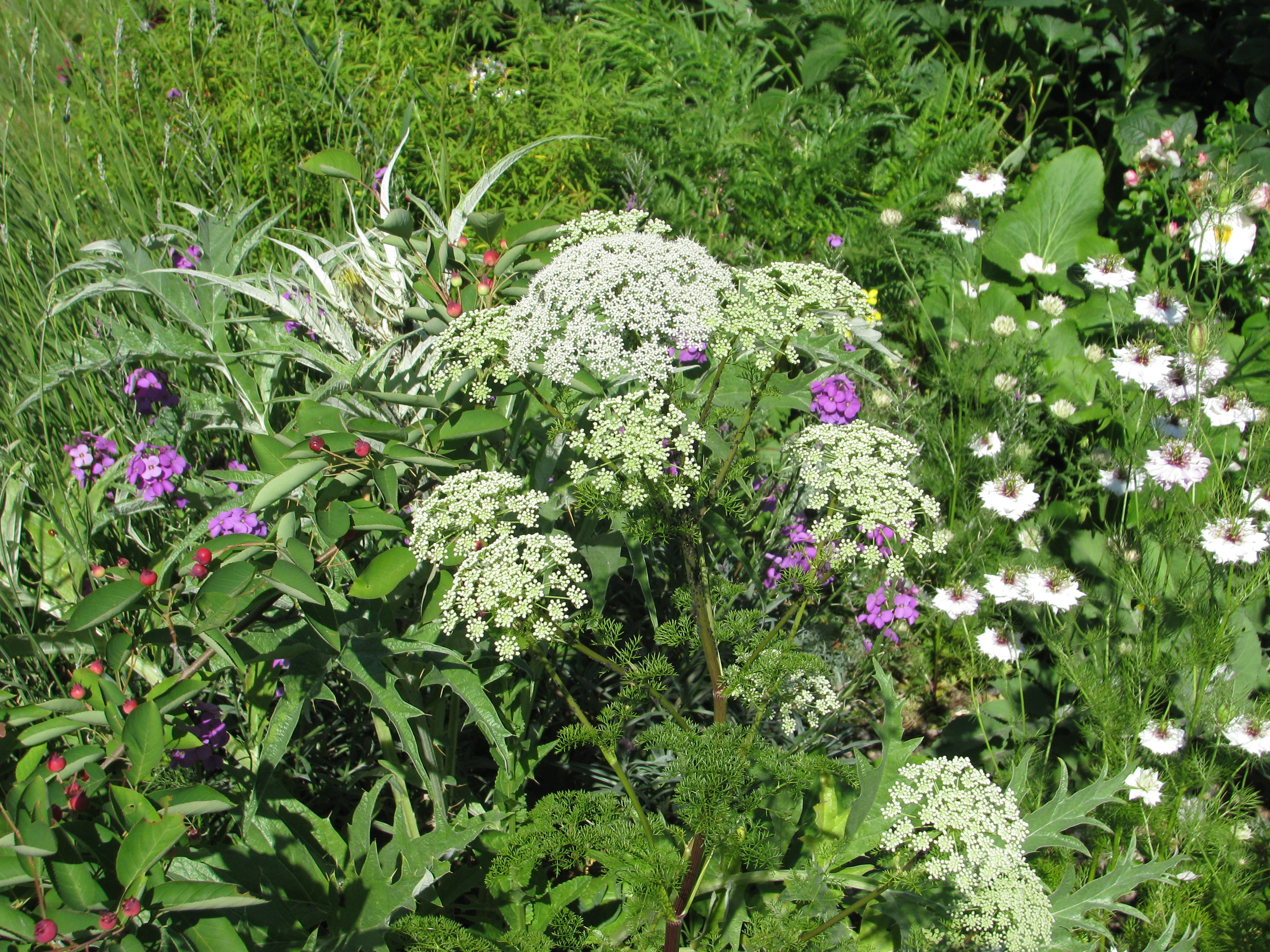
- Ligusticum lucidum

Conservation status
- Critically Endangered (IUCN 3.1)

Scientific classification
- Kingdom: Plantae
- Clade: Tracheophytes
- Clade: Angiosperms
- Clade: Eudicots
- Clade: Asterids
- Order: Apiales
- Family: Apiaceae
- Genus: Ligusticum
- Species: L. huteri

Binomial name
- Ligusticum huteri Porta & Rigo

Synonyms
- Coritospermum huteri (Porta & Rigo) L.Sáez & Rosselló; Ligusticum lucidum Mill. ssp. huteri (Porta & Rigo) O.Bolos

= Ligusticum huteri =

Species of flowering plant

Ligusticum huteri is a species of flowering plant in the family Apiaceae, endemic to the Serra de Tramuntana on Mallorca, Spain. The plant's natural habitats are limestone cliffs and rocky ridges at elevations of 1,300–1,400 metres (4,300–4,600 ft).
