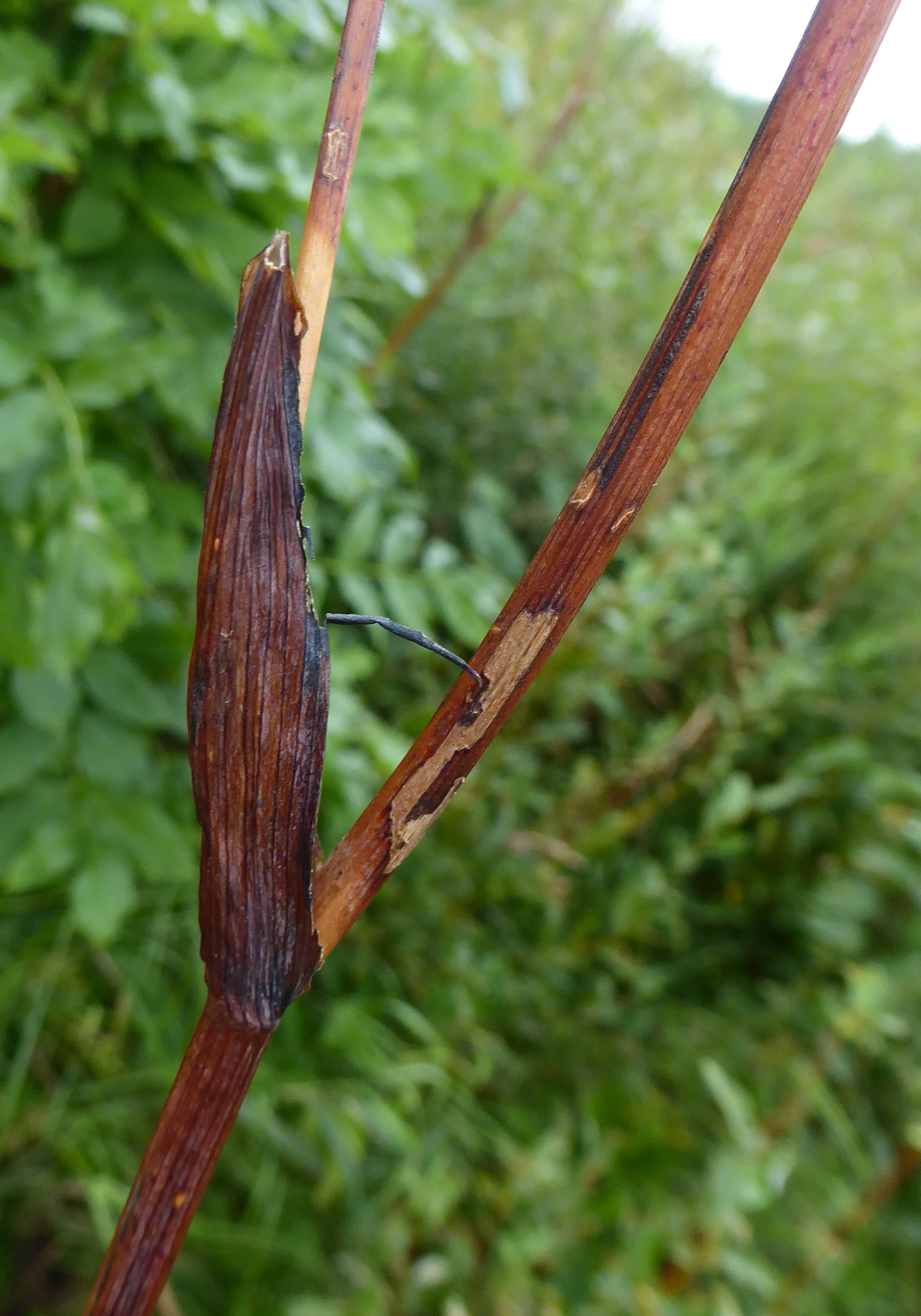

Scientific classification
- Kingdom: Plantae
- Clade: Tracheophytes
- Clade: Angiosperms
- Clade: Eudicots
- Clade: Asterids
- Order: Apiales
- Family: Apiaceae
- Genus: Conioselinum
- Species: C. tataricum

Binomial name
- Conioselinum tataricum Hoffm.

= Conioselinum tataricum =

Species of flowering plant

Conioselinum tataricum is a species of flowering plant belonging to the family Apiaceae.

Its native range is Afghanistan to Central Asia and Himalaya.
