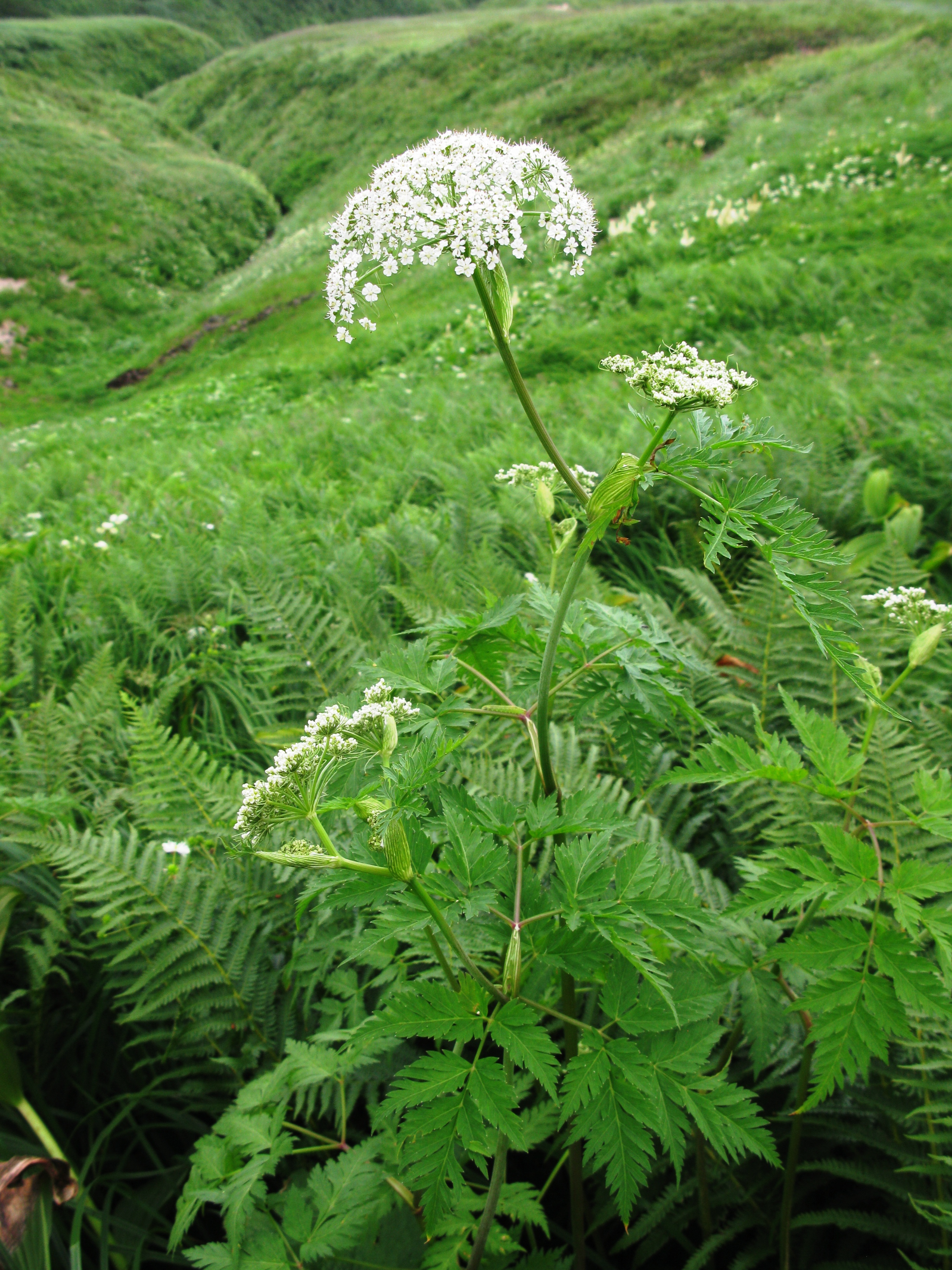
- Conioselinum filicinum

Scientific classification
- Kingdom: Plantae
- Clade: Tracheophytes
- Clade: Angiosperms
- Clade: Eudicots
- Clade: Asterids
- Order: Apiales
- Family: Apiaceae
- Subfamily: Apioideae
- Genus: Conioselinum; Hoffm.

Type species
- Conioselinum tataricum

Synonyms
- Kreidion Raf.

= Conioselinum =

Genus of flowering plants

Conioselinum is a genus of flowering plant in the family Apiaceae, native to Eurasia and North America. Its species are erect perennial plants with deeply toothed compound leaves and umbels of white flowers. Plants of this genus are known commonly as hemlock-parsley.

== Species ==
As of December 2022, Plants of the World Online accepted the following species:

- Conioselinum acuminatum (Franch.) Lavrova
- Conioselinum anthriscoides (H.Boissieu) Pimenov & Kljuykov
- Conioselinum chinense (L.) Britton, Sterns & Poggenb.
- Conioselinum longifolium Turcz.
- Conioselinum mexicanum J.M.Coult. & Rose
- Conioselinum morrisonense Hayata
- Conioselinum nepalense Pimenov & Kljuykov
- Conioselinum pseudoangelica (H.Boissieu) Pimenov & Kljuykov
- Conioselinum pteridophyllum (Franch.) Lavrova
- Conioselinum reflexum Pimenov & Kljuykov
- Conioselinum scopulorum (A.Gray) J.M.Coult. & Rose
- Conioselinum shanii Pimenov & Kljuykov
- Conioselinum sinchianum (K.T.Fu) Pimenov & Kljuykov
- Conioselinum smithii (H.Wolff) Pimenov & Kljuykov
- Conioselinum tataricum Hoffm.
- Conioselinum tenuisectum (H.Boissieu) Pimenov & Kljuykov
- Conioselinum tenuissimum (Nakai) Pimenov & Kljuykov
