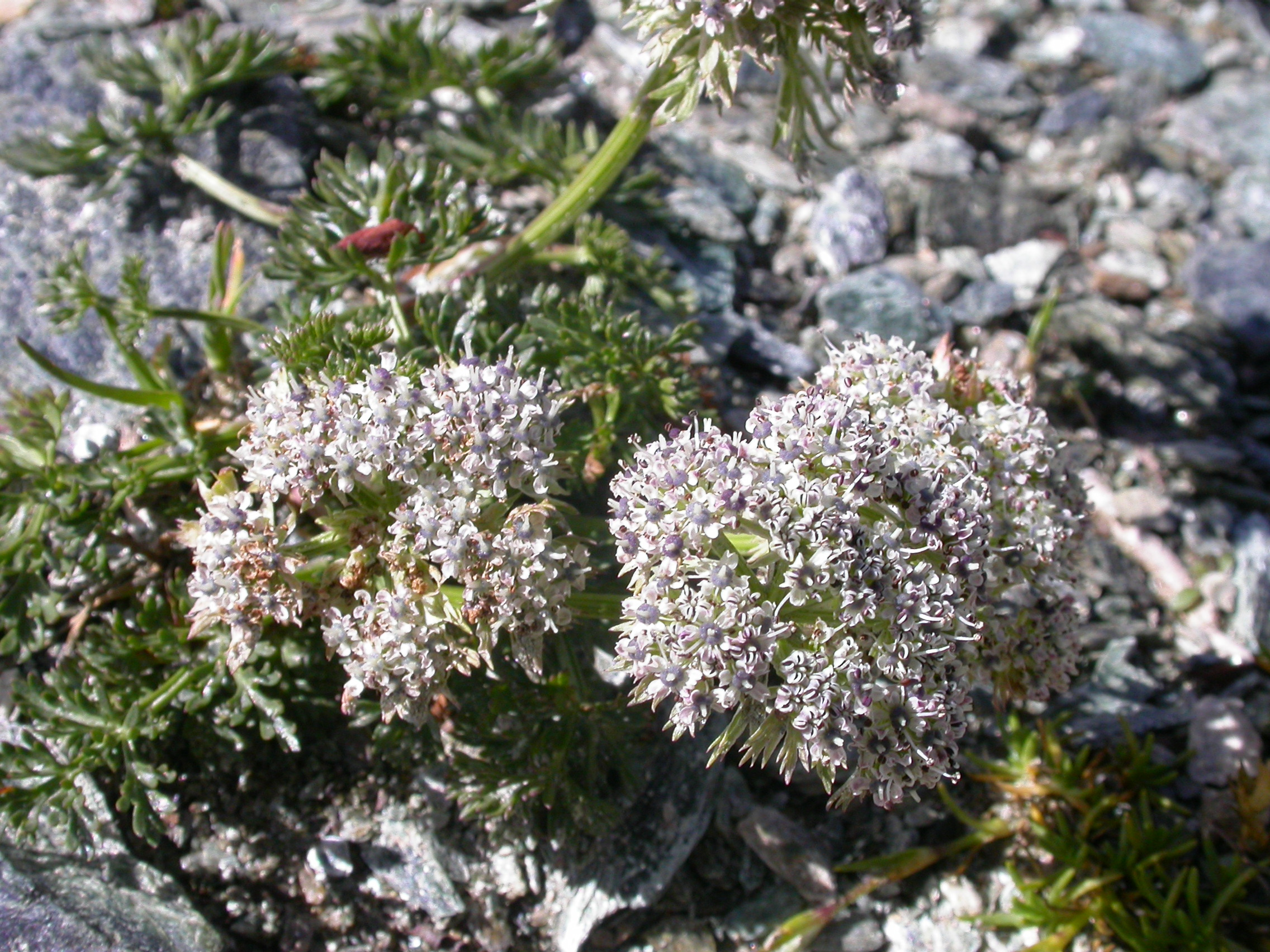
- Named as Ligusticum mutellinoides (the most common synonym)

Scientific classification
- Kingdom: Plantae
- Clade: Embryophytes
- Clade: Tracheophytes
- Clade: Angiosperms
- Clade: Eudicots
- Clade: Asterids
- Order: Apiales
- Family: Apiaceae
- Subfamily: Apioideae
- Genus: Neogaya
- Species: N. simplex

Binomial name
- Neogaya simplex (L.) Meisn.

Synonyms
- Synonyms: Arpitium alpinum (Ledeb.) Koso-Pol.; Arpitium simplex (L.) Koso-Pol.; Conioselinum gayoides Less.; Gaya multicaulis Schur; Gaya simplex (L.) Gaudin; Laserpitium mutellinoides Crantz; Laserpitium simplex L.; Ligusticum albomarginatum Drudev; Ligusticum alpinum (Ledeb.) Kurtz; Ligusticum mutellinoides (Crantz) Vill.; Ligusticum simplex (L.) All.; Mutellina mutellinoides (Crantz) Holub; Neogaya albomarginata (Rupr.) O.Fedtsch. & B.Fedtsch.; Pachypleurum albomarginatum Rupr.; Pachypleurum alpinum Ledeb.; Pachypleurum mutellinoides (Crantz) Holub; Pachypleurum schischkinii Serg.; Pachypleurum simplex (L.) Rchb.; Selinum sibiricum Retz.; Selinum simplex (L.) Prantl; Thysselinum involucratum Moench

= Neogaya =

Genus of flowering plants

Neogaya is a monotypic genus of flowering plants belonging to the family Apiaceae. It contains just one species, Neogaya simplex, and can be found in Europe, the Alps, the western and southern Carpathians, former Yugoslavia, Belarus. European Russia, Kazakhstan, China, and western Siberia.

== Description ==
It is a perennial, It grows between 5–30 cm (2–12 in) tall. It has glabrous (smooth), straight, erect stems, that are grooved or ribbed. It has basal leaves, which have a long petiole (leaf stalk). They are linear-lanceolate, or ovate shaped. They are dark green with a purplish margin, and measure 3–6 cm long and 2–5 cm wide. In Europe, it blooms from June to August. They are 2–5 cm (1–2 in) in diameter, in compound umbels, or 8-20 rounds of 3 lobed petals. They are in shades of white or pinkish. After flowering it produces a seed capsule or 'fruit', which like other members of the Apiaceae family, is polachenarium, a dry schizocarpic fruit consisting of monocarps separating from a longitudinal central axis (columella or carpophore), often remaining attached to the axis at maturity. It is about 3–5 mm long, and 3.2-3.6 mm wide, with dark brownish lilca stripes. It is broadly ellipsoidal, or prolonged ellipsoid, with a dorsal side that is convex with five winged ridges.

== Taxonomy ==
The genus name of Neogaya is in honour of Jaques Étienne Gay (1786–1864), a Swiss-French botanist, civil servant, collector and taxonomist. The Latin specific epithet of simplex means simple or unbranched from simplicissimus. Both the genus and the species were first described and published in Pl. Vasc. Gen. Vol.1 on page 104 in 1837.

This species has rather large synonymy due to its complicated generic delimitation in Asiatic high mountainous Apiaceae family with similar lifeforms (see Pimenov, 1982; Lavrova et al., 1987; Pimenov & Kljuykov, 2001). The species was re-established as the genus Neogaya Meisn. during the revision of Middle Asiatic taxa of the Apiaceae (Pimenov, 1982, 1983).

The genus is recognised by United States Department of Agriculture and the Agricultural Research Service, but they do not list any known species. The 21 known synonyms of the species are listed in the taxobox (top righthand corner). It is accepted by the Global Biodiversity Information Facility, and Tropicos.

It has the common name of 'Small Alpine Lovage', or 'Alpine lovage' with the most commonly known synonym of Ligusticum mutellinoides Vill. In Slovakia, it is known as 'simple dill'.

== Distribution and habitat ==
=== Range ===
It is found in Europe, within the countries of Austria, Czechoslovakia, France, Germany, Italy, Romania, Poland, Switzerland and Yugoslavia. This is includes the mountains of the Alps, the Carpathians and the Balkans. It is found in Russia, within the regions of Altai Krai, Siberia (in Irkutsk Oblast, Krasnoyarsk Krai, Yakutskiya, Buryatia, Chita Oblast) and the Far Eastern Federal District (in Khabarovsk Krai, Kamchatka Krai, Magadan Oblast). It is found in Asia, within Kazakhstan, Mongolia, Uzbekistan and Xinjiang (in China).

=== Habitat ===
It grows on Alpine meadows, on rocky or stony areas, stony meadows, or grassy areas, on overgrown rocks, and rubble or screes, at the subalpine and alpine regions.

== Other sources ==
- Pimenov M.G., 1982. Two new genera of Umbelliferae from the group of Ligusticeae. Bjull. Moskovsk. Obsc. Isp. Prir. Otd. Biol. 87(1): 111–117. (in Russian, with Latin diagnoses).
- Pimenov, M.G. 1983. Umbelliferae. In: Vvedensky, A.I. (Ed.), Conspectus Florae Asiae Mediae 7: 167–322. Tashkent
