= Jaques Étienne Gay =

Swiss-French botanist

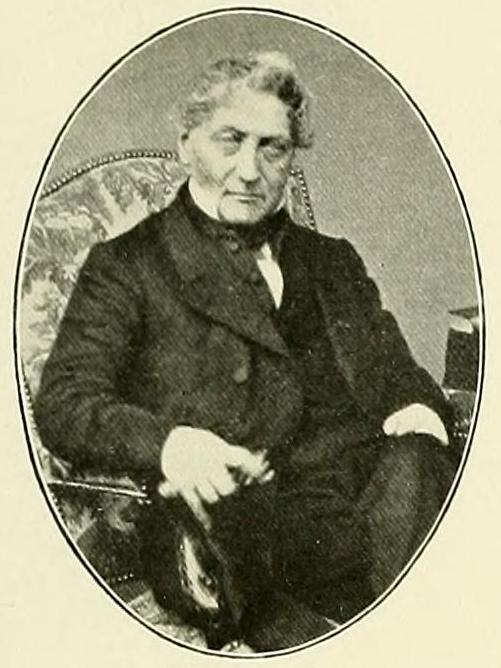
image of Jacques Gay at Acta Horti Berg 1905

Jaques Étienne Gay (1786 in Switzerland – 1864) was a Swiss-French botanist, civil servant, collector and taxonomist. His name is associated with plants in standardised botanical nomenclature, e.g. Crocus sieberi J.Gay. He was the most famous of the students of botanist Jean François Aimée Gaudin with whom he began collecting plants at the age of 14. He was married to Rosalie Nillion.

The botanical genus Gaya was named in his honour, as well as the genus Neogaya belonging to the family Apiaceae. Also the species Potamogeton gayi A.Benn. in 1892.

== Publications ==
- Gay, Jacques Etienne. 1857. Recherches sur les caractères de la végétation du fraisier et sur la distribution géographique de ses espèces, avec la description de deux nouvelles. Annales des Sciences Naturelles (Botanique) 4th ser. 8: 185–208
- Gay, Jacques Etienne. 1821. Monographie des cinq genres de plantes que comprend la tribu des Lasiopetalées dans la famille des Buttneriacées.

== Related pages ==
List of botanists by author abbreviation
