= Tanaproget =

Chemical compound

Clinical data
- ATC code: none

Legal status
- Legal status: Investigational

Identifiers
- IUPAC name: 5-(4,4-Dimethyl-2-thioxo-1,4-dihydro-2H-3,1-benzoxazin-6-yl)-1-methyl-1H-pyrrole-2-carbonitrile
- CAS Number: 304853-42-7
- PubChem CID: 4369524
- DrugBank: DB04787
- ChemSpider: 3572060
- UNII: W9F9H8GXWR
- CompTox Dashboard (EPA): DTXSID00184556
- ECHA InfoCard: 100.217.016

Chemical and physical data
- Formula: C_{16}H_{15}N_{3}OS
- Molar mass: 297.38 g·mol^{−1}
- 3D model (JSmol): Interactive image
- SMILES: CC1(C2=C(C=CC(=C2)C3=CC=C(N3C)C#N)NC(=S)O1)C
- InChI: InChI=1S/C16H15N3OS/c1-16(2)12-8-10(4-6-13(12)18-15(21)20-16)14-7-5-11(9-17)19(14)3/h4-8H,1-3H3,(H,18,21); Key:PYVFWTPEBMRKSR-UHFFFAOYSA-N

Tanaproget (INN; developmental code names NSP-989, WAY-166989) is an investigational nonsteroidal progestin. It is a high affinity, high efficacy, and very selective agonist of the progesterone receptor (PR). Due to its much more selective binding profile relative to most conventional, steroidal progestins, tanaproget may prove to produce fewer side effects in comparison. As of December 2010, it is in phase II clinical trials in the process of being developed for clinical use as a contraceptive by Ligand Pharmaceuticals.

An analog of tanaproget, 4-fluoropropyltanaproget (^{18}F), has been developed as a radiotracer for imaging of the PR in positron emission tomography.

== See also ==
- Finerenone
- Mapracorat
- Prinaberel
