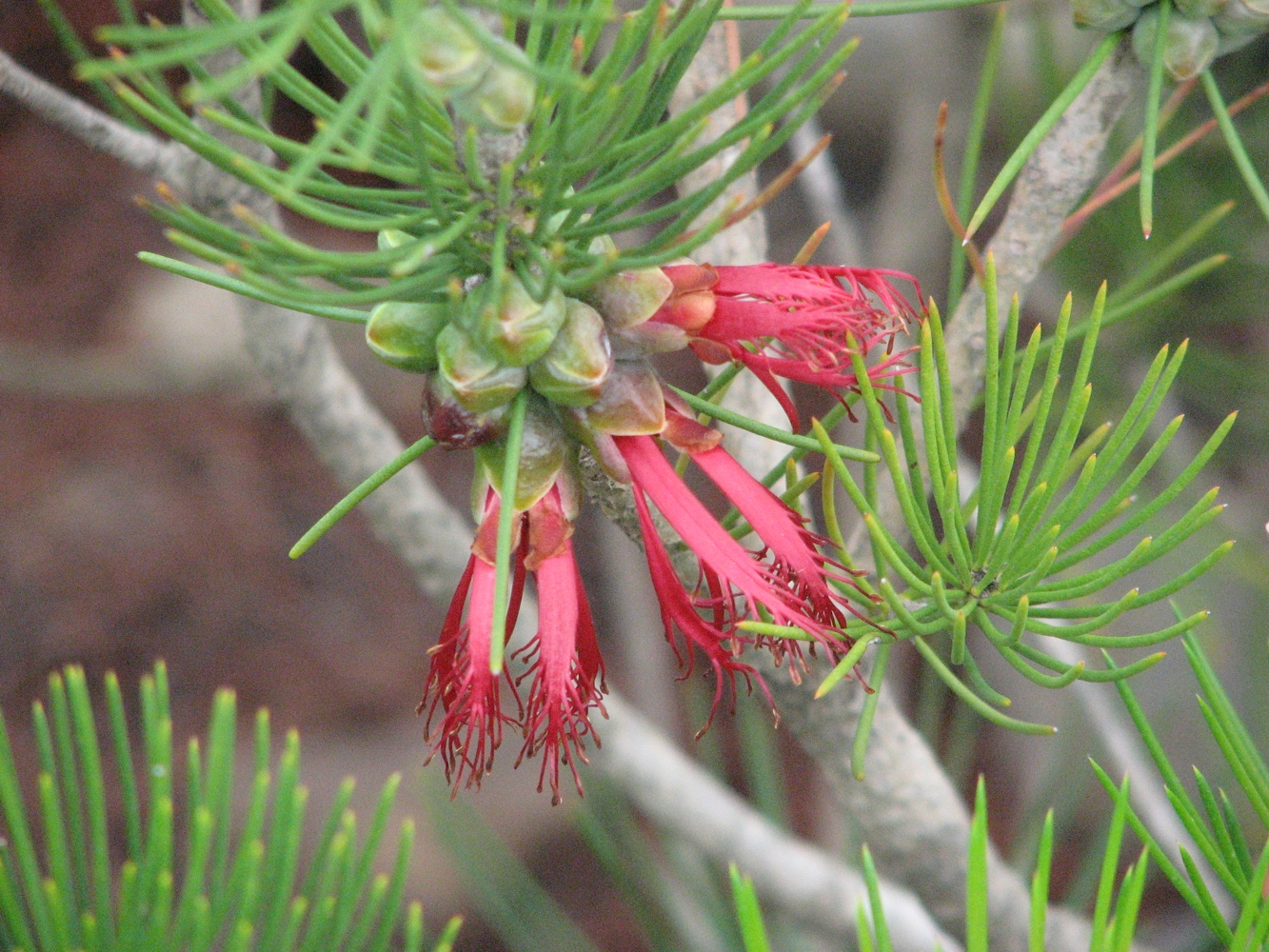
- Subspecies graniticus in the Royal Botanic Gardens, Cranbourne

Conservation status
- Priority Four — Rare Taxa (DEC)

Scientific classification
- Kingdom: Plantae
- Clade: Tracheophytes
- Clade: Angiosperms
- Clade: Eudicots
- Clade: Rosids
- Order: Myrtales
- Family: Myrtaceae
- Genus: Calothamnus
- Species: C. graniticus

Binomial name
- Calothamnus graniticus Hawkeswood

Synonyms
- Melaleuca granitica (Hawkeswood) Craven & R.D.Edwards

= Calothamnus graniticus =

Species of flowering plant

Calothamnus graniticus, commonly known as granite claw flower, is a plant in the myrtle family, Myrtaceae and is endemic to the south-west of Western Australia. There are two subspecies, both of which have been classified as "near threatened". It is an erect, rounded shrub with pine-like, dark, grey-green foliage and usually bright red flowers. Calothamnus graniticus subsp. graniticus occurs in the Leeuwin-Naturaliste National Park and is the floral emblem of the nearby city of Busselton. (In 2014 Craven, Edwards and Cowley proposed that the species be renamed Melaleuca granitica.)

== Description ==
Calothamnus graniticus is an erect, compact shrub, sometimes with many stems, growing to a height of about 2.0 metres (7 ft). Its leaves are usually 40–80 millimetres (2–3 in) long, cylindrical in shape and taper to a non-prickly point. They are covered with short, white hairs giving the leaves a greyish tinge.

The flowers are usually bright red, sometimes cream coloured, and are arranged in clusters or irregular spikes containing 2 to 25 individual flowers, mostly on old, leafless wood. The petals are 6–7 millimetres (0.2–0.3 in) long and the stamens are arranged in 4 claw-like bundles with 20 to 25 stamens per bundle. Flowering occurs from May to August and is followed by fruits which are woody, almost cylindrical capsules, 6.5–10 millimetres (0.3–0.4 in) long and 7–10 millimetres (0.3–0.4 in) in diameter.

== Taxonomy and naming ==
Calothamnus graniticus was first formally described in 1984 by Trevor Hawkeswood in the botanical journal Nuytsia. The specific epithet (graniticus) refers to the fact that this species always grows in soil derived from granite.

There are two subspecies:

- Calothamnus graniticus Hawkeswood subsp. graniticus has leaves about 1.5 millimetres (0.06 in) in diameter, flowers in cluster or spikes of up to 15 and is endemic to the Cape Naturaliste area;
- Calothamnus graniticus subsp. leptophyllus (Benth.) Hawkeswood has leaves 0.5–0.8 millimetres (0.02–0.03 in) in diameter, flowers in clusters or spikes of up to 25 and occurs in the area between Dwellingup and Collie. (It had originally been described in 1867 by George Bentham as a variety of Calothamnus torulosus.)

== Distribution and habitat ==
Calothamnus graniticus occurs in and between the Cape Naturaliste, Dwellingup and Collie areas in the Jarrah Forest biogeographic region where it grows in sandy soils derived from granite.

== Conservation status ==
Calothamnus graniticus is listed as "Priority Four" by the Government of Western Australia Department of Biodiversity, Conservation and Attractions, meaning that is rare or near threatened.

== Use in horticulture ==
Calothamnus graniticus is an attractive shrub growing well in warm climates and in a sunny position. Propagation is easy from seed and the mature plant responds well to pruning.
