= Box (disambiguation) =

A box is a container or package, usually with parallel, flat, rectangular sides.

Box or boxes may also refer to:

== Arts and entertainment ==
=== Fictional characters ===
- Box (comics), a Marvel comics superhero
- Box, a robot in the 1976 film Logan's Run

=== Film ===
- Box (film), a 2015 Romanian film
- BOX: The Hakamada Case, a 2010 documentary about boxer Iwao Hakamada
- Boxes (film), a 2007 French film

=== Music ===
==== Albums ====
- Box (Chocolate Starfish album), 1995
- Box, a 1995 album by Dive
- Box (Gas album), 2016
- Boxes (Goo Goo Dolls album), 2016, and the title track
- Box (Guided by Voices album), 1995
- Box, a 1996 album by Christie Hennessy
- Box, a 2006 album by Mellowdrone
- Box (Sam Brown album), 1997
- B.O.X: Best of X, a 1996 album by X Japan
- Boxes (Sydney Dance Company album), 1985

==== Songs ====
- "Boxes", a 1984 song by Prodigal from Electric Eye
- "Boxes", a 2007 song by Charlie Winston from Make Way
- "Boxes", a 2020 song by Moses Sumney from Græ

== Places ==
- Box, Gloucestershire, England
- Box, Wiltshire, England
  - Box Tunnel, a railway tunnel
- River Box, Suffolk, England
- Box, Oklahoma, United States
- Box Hill (disambiguation)

== People ==
- Box (surname), including a list of people with the name
- Edgar Box, a pen name used by writer Gore Vidal
- "Box", nickname of Henry Box Brown (c. 1815–1897), an African-American slave who had himself shipped to freedom in a wooden crate

== Science and technology ==
- Box, common name of the plant genus Buxus
- Box, common name of some species of Eucalyptus trees
- GNOME Boxes, a virtualization application for the GNOME desktop environment
- □ ("box") operator in mathematics, used for:
  - Logical necessity in modal logic
  - Conway box function
  - D'Alembert operator
- Rectangular cuboid, a geometric figure
- Hyperrectangle, in geometry
- BOx (psychedelics), a group of psychedelics and other psychoactive drugs
- BOXES algorithm, used by the Matchbox Educable Noughts and Crosses Engine
- Buried oxide layer, in semiconductor fabrication

== Sport ==
- Box (juggling), a juggling pattern for three objects
- Box, an American football term
- Box, an abdominal guard in cricket clothing and equipment
- Box, to participate in boxing, a combat sport
- IOC sport code for boxing at the Summer Olympics
- Penalty box, or simply box, a place where sports players assigned penalties sit

== Other uses ==
- AeroLogic, a German cargo airline (ICAO airline code BOX)
- Box (company), a file sharing and cloud content management company
- Box (theatre), a small, separated area
- Box (torture), a method of solitary confinement
- Combat box, flying formation used by bombers during World War II
- Box, a type of Hi-Riser automobile
- MI5, the British Security Service, called "Box 500" or "Box"
- Boston Options Exchange, or BOX
- Borroloola Airport, IATA airport code "BOX"
- Box, Design & Build, a New Zealand design and construction company
- Safe deposit box, an individually secured container, usually held within a larger safe or bank vault

== See also ==
- The Box (disambiguation)
- Black box (disambiguation)
