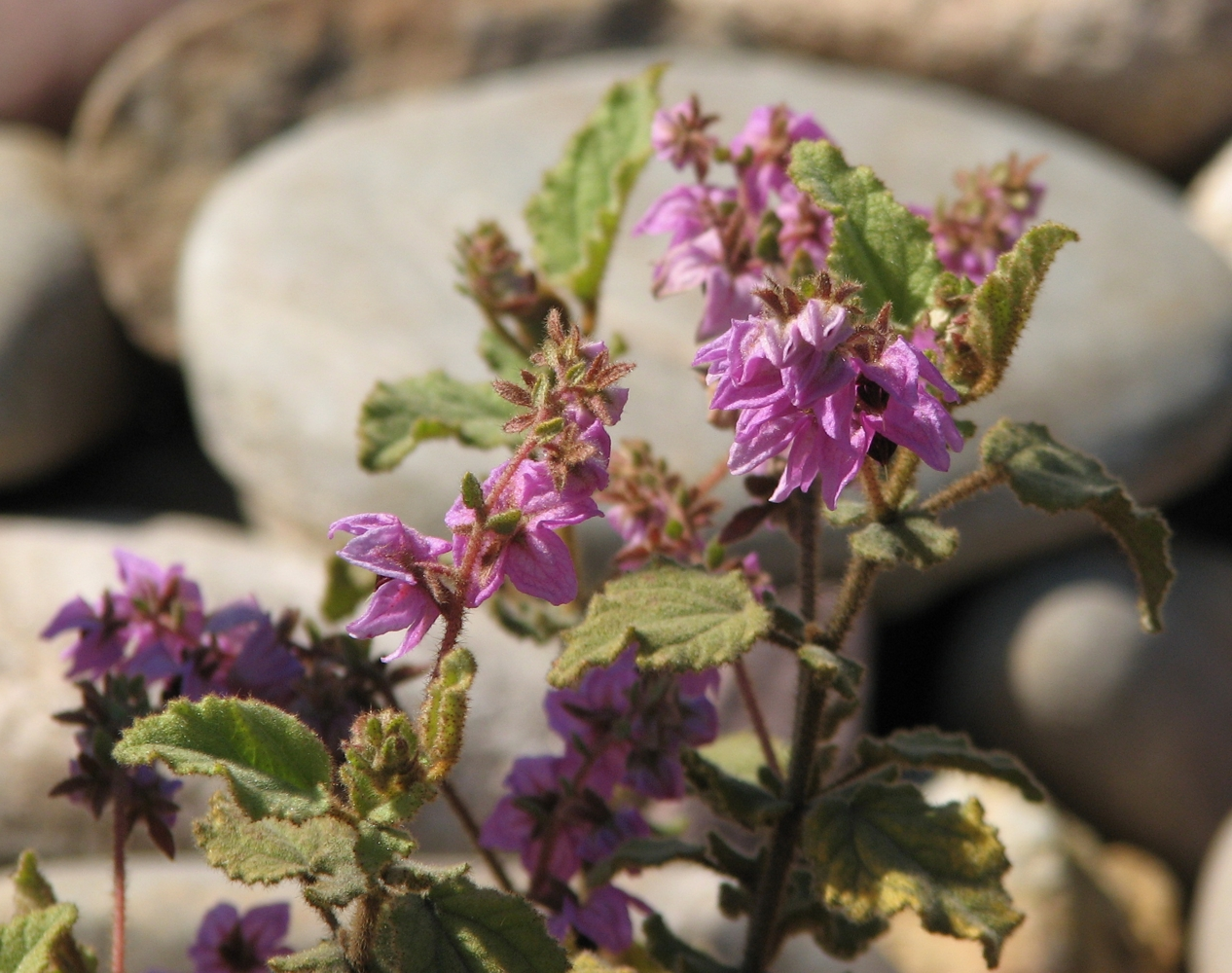
- In Royal Botanic Gardens, Cranbourne

Conservation status
- Priority Three — Poorly Known Taxa (DEC)

Scientific classification
- Kingdom: Plantae
- Clade: Tracheophytes
- Clade: Angiosperms
- Clade: Eudicots
- Clade: Rosids
- Order: Malvales
- Family: Malvaceae
- Genus: Thomasia
- Species: T. tenuivestita

Binomial name
- Thomasia tenuivestita F.Muell.

= Thomasia tenuivestita =

Species of shrub

Thomasia tenuivestita is a species of flowering plant in the family Malvaceae and is endemic to the south-west of Western Australia. It is a shrub with its new growth covered with greyish, star-shaped hairs, and has egg-shaped leaves, and racemes of mauve flowers.

== Description ==
Thomasia tenuivestita is a shrub that typically grows to 0.5–2 m (1 ft 8 in – 6 ft 7 in) high, 0.6–1.2 m (2 ft 0 in – 3 ft 11 in) wide, and has many soft branches, its new growth covered with greyish, star-shaped hairs. The leaves are egg-shaped with a heart-shaped base, 20–70 mm (0.79–2.76 in) long and 10–35 mm (0.39–1.38 in) wide on a petiole 4–8 mm (0.16–0.31 in) long. There are 2 leaf-like stipules at the base of each petiole. Both surfaces of the leaves are covered with star-shaped hairs and the edges of the leaves have irregular teeth. The flowers are arranged in racemes of 3 to 7, 30–50 mm (1.2–2.0 in) long, each flower on a pedicel 4–6 mm (0.16–0.24 in) long with hairy, narrowly egg-shaped bracteoles at the base. The flowers are up to 12 mm (0.47 in) in diameter, the sepals mauve and hairy, the petals small and rounded. Flowering occurs from July to October.

== Taxonomy and naming ==
Thomasia tenuivestita was first formally described in 1860 by Ferdinand von Mueller in his Fragmenta Phytographiae Australiae. The specific epithet (tenuivestita) means "thinly-covered".

== Distribution and habitat ==
This thomasia grows in woodland and heath, often between granite boulders or in swampy places, in scattered populations near Coorow, Badgingarra, Wongan Hills, Hyden and York in the Avon Wheatbelt, Geraldton Sandplains, Jarrah Forest and Mallee bioregions of south-western Western Australia.

== Conservation status ==
Thomasia tenuivestita is listed as "Priority Three" by the Government of Western Australia Department of Biodiversity, Conservation and Attractions, meaning that it is poorly known and known from only a few locations but is not under imminent threat.
