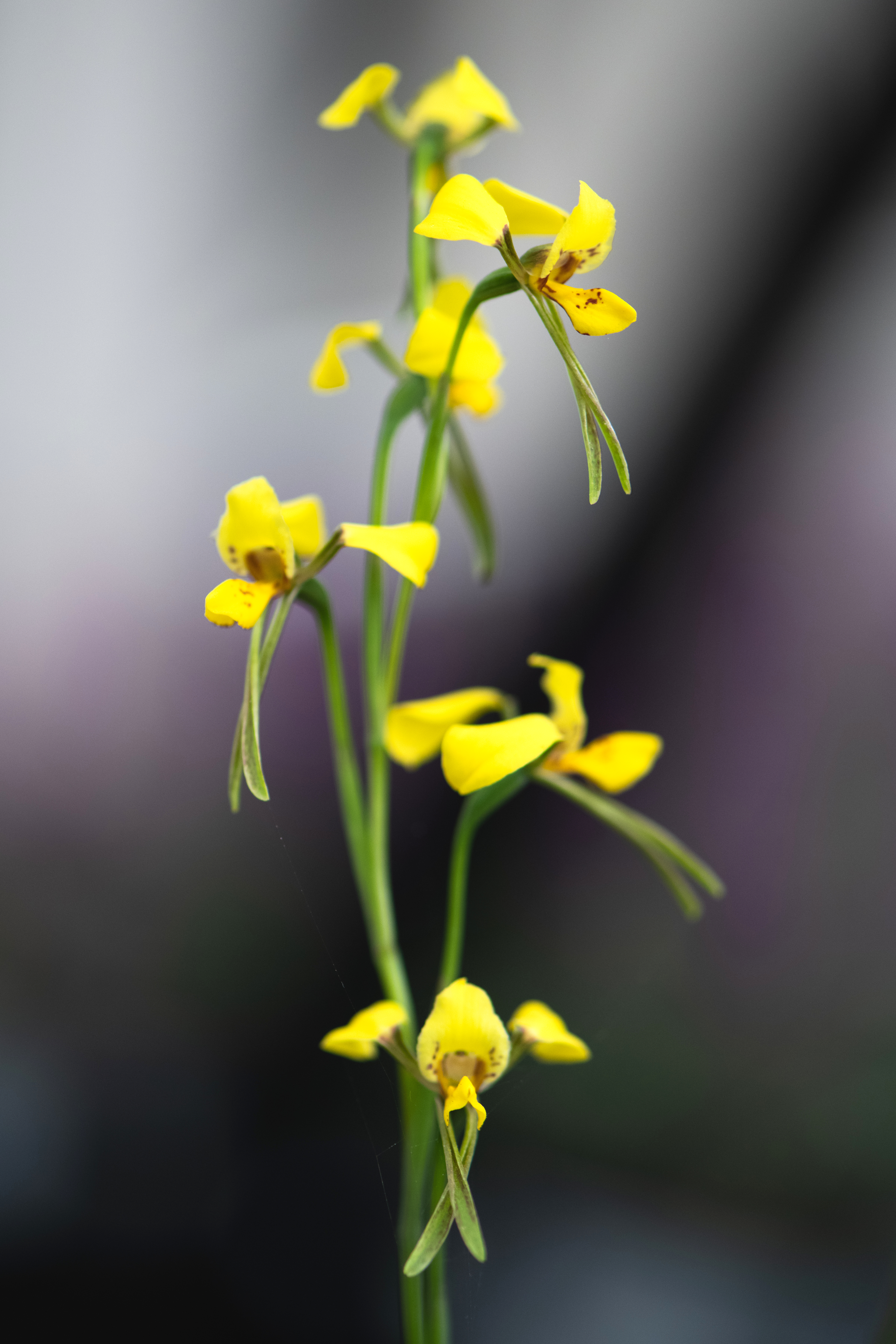
- In Royal Botanic Gardens, Cranbourne

Scientific classification
- Kingdom: Plantae
- Clade: Tracheophytes
- Clade: Angiosperms
- Clade: Monocots
- Order: Asparagales
- Family: Orchidaceae
- Subfamily: Orchidoideae
- Tribe: Diurideae
- Genus: Diuris
- Species: D. luteola

Binomial name
- Diuris luteola D.L.Jones & B.Gray

= Diuris luteola =

Northern doubletail

Species of orchid

Diuris luteola, commonly called the northern doubletail, is a species of orchid which is endemic to Queensland. It has a single linear leaf at its base and up to six pale yellow flowers with a few brown markings. It grows in shallow, stony soil on tablelands in eastern parts of the state.

== Description ==
Diuris luteola is a tuberous, perennial herb with a single linear leaf 200–350 mm (8–10 in) long, 3–4 mm (0.1–0.2 in) wide with a purplish base. Up to six pale yellow flowers with a few brown markings, about 25 mm (1 in) wide are borne on a flowering stem 120–450 mm (5–20 in) tall. The dorsal sepal projects forward and is egg-shaped, 7–10 mm (0.3–0.4 in) long and 5–8 mm (0.2–0.3 in) wide. The lateral sepals are linear to lance-shaped with the narrower end towards the base, green with brown blotches, 12–20 mm (0.5–0.8 in) long, about 2 mm (0.08 in) wide, turned downwards and crossed over each other. The petals are more or less erect, spread apart from each other with an elliptic to egg-shaped blade with the narrower end towards the base. They are 6–10 mm (0.2–0.4 in) long and 4.5–8.5 mm (0.2–0.3 in) wide on a dark reddish brown stalk 3–5 mm (0.12–0.20 in) long. The labellum is 6–9 mm (0.2–0.4 in) long, usually projects forwards and has three lobes. The centre lobe is linear to egg-shaped, 4–7 mm (0.2–0.3 in) wide with a few pale brown markings. The side lobes are linear to oblong, erect, about 3 mm (0.1 in) long and 1–1.5 mm (0.04–0.06 in) wide. There are two parallel ridge-like calli about 5 mm (0.20 in) long near the base of the mid-line of the base of the labellum. Flowering occurs from July to September.

== Taxonomy and naming ==
Diuris luteola was first formally described in 1991 by David Jones and Bruce Gray from a specimen collected on the Atherton Tableland near Herberton and the description was published in Australian Orchid Research. The specific epithet (luteola) is a Latin word meaning "yellowish", referring to the colour of the flowers of this species.

== Distribution and habitat ==
The northern doubletail grows in shallow soil in grassy forest from Mount Windsor adjacent to the Daintree National Park to the Blackdown Tableland.
