= Box game =

Box game may refer to:

- Black Box (game), a board game for one or two players that simulates shooting rays into a black box to deduce the locations of "atoms" hidden inside
- The Box (disambiguation)#Series, various television game shows
- Box-making game, a biased positional game where two players alternately pick elements from a family of pairwise-disjoint sets ("boxes")
- Candy Box!, a 2013 video game
- Dots and boxes, a pencil-and-paper game for two players who take turns adding a single horizontal or vertical line between two unjoined adjacent dots
- Hot box (game), a team sport that is similar to ultimate but played on a smaller field with fewer players
- Jury Box (game), a 1937 parlour game
- The Orange Box, a 2007 video game compilation

== See also ==
Game box (disambiguation)
