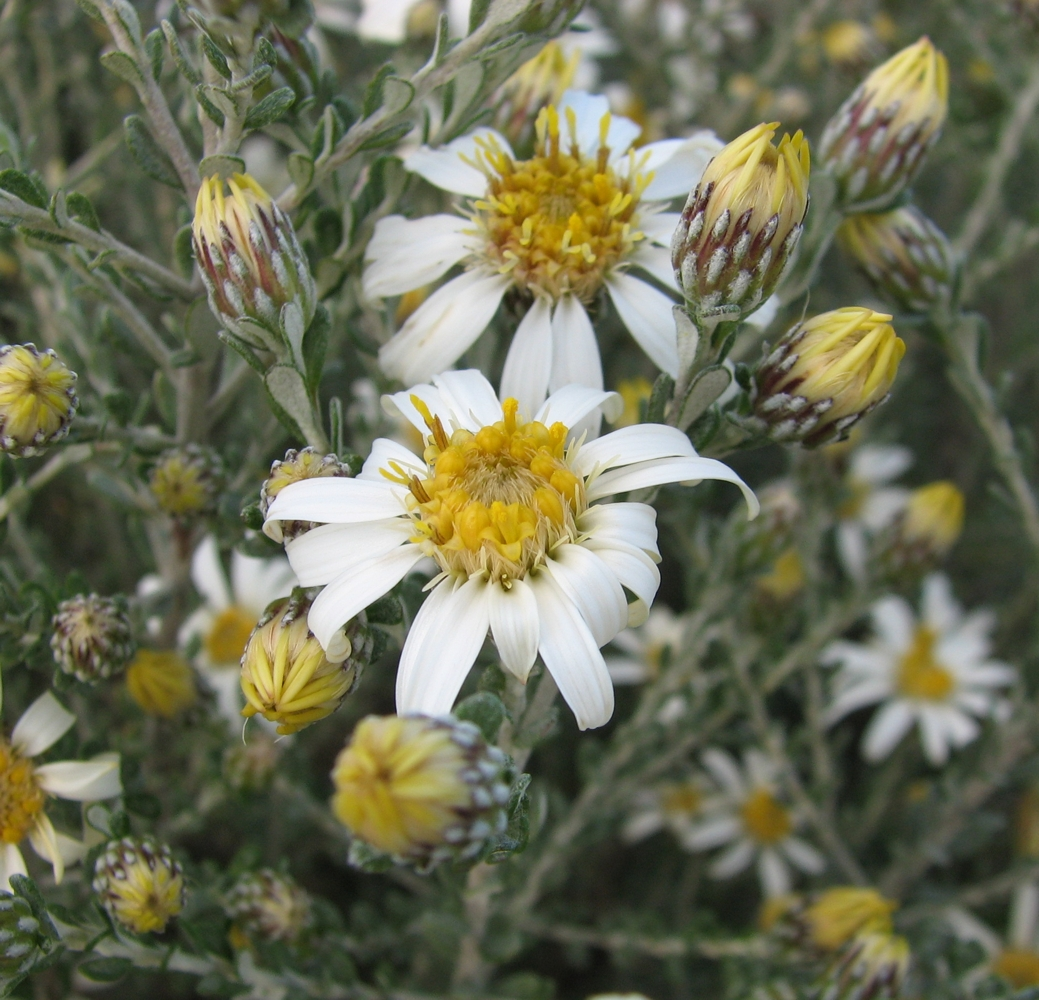
- In Royal Botanic Gardens, Cranbourne

Scientific classification
- Kingdom: Plantae
- Clade: Tracheophytes
- Clade: Angiosperms
- Clade: Eudicots
- Clade: Asterids
- Order: Asterales
- Family: Asteraceae
- Genus: Olearia
- Species: O. pimeleoides

Binomial name
- Olearia pimeleoides (DC.) Benth.

Synonyms
- Aster pimeloides A.Cunn. ex DC. nom. inval., pro syn.; Eurybia pimeleoides DC.; Eurybia sericocarpa F.Muell. ex Sond. nom. inval., pro syn.; Olearia pimeleoides (DC.) Benth. subsp. pimeleoides; Olearia pimeleoides (DC.) Benth. var. pimeleoides; Olearia propinqua S.Moore; Shawia pimeleoides (DC.) Sch.Bip.

= Olearia pimeleoides =

Species of plant

Olearia pimeleoides, commonly known as pimelea daisy-bush, is a species of flowering plant in the family Asteraceae and is endemic to southern continental Australia. It is an erect shrub with elliptic, linear or lance-shaped leaves, and white and pale yellow, daisy-like inflorescences.

== Description ==
Olearia pimeleoides is a shrub that typically grows to a height of up to about 1 m (3 ft 3 in), its branchlets densely white woolly-hairy. The leaves are arranged alternately along the branches, elliptic, linear or lance-shaped with the narrower end towards the base, 3–15 mm (0.12–0.59 in) long, 1–6 mm (0.039–0.236 in) wide and more or less sessile. The lower surface of the leaves is densely covered with white, woolly hairs. The heads or daisy-like "flowers" are usually arranged singly on the ends of branches and are sessile, 15–35 mm (0.59–1.38 in) in diameter with a conical to hemispherical involucre at the base. Each head has 8 to 25 white ray florets, the ligule 8–20 mm (0.31–0.79 in) long, surrounding 14 to 15 pale yellow disc florets. Flowering occurs from August to October and the fruit is an achene 1.5–3.0 mm (0.059–0.118 in) long, the pappus 7–9 mm (0.28–0.35 in) long.

== Taxonomy ==
This daisy was first formally described in 1836 by Augustin Pyramus de Candolle who gave it the name Eurybia pimeleoides in his Prodromus Systematis Naturalis Regni Vegetabilis. In 1867, George Bentham changed the name to Olearia pimeleoides in Flora Australiensis. The specific epithet (pimeleoides) means "Pimelea-like".

== Distribution and habitat ==
Pimelea daisy-bush is widespread and common in southern Australia, where it grows in mallee woodlands and shrublands, and in forest. It is widespread in the south-west of Western Australia, the south-east of South Australia, north-western Victoria and on the western plains of New South Wales.
