= Box (surname) =

Box is a surname. Notable people with the surname include:

== Arts and entertainment ==
- Betty Box (1915–1999), British film producer
- C. J. Box (born 1958), American author
- David Box (1943–1964), American rock musician
- Edgar Box, a pen name used by American writer Gore Vidal (1925–2012)
- John Box (1920–2005), British film designer
- Mick Box (born 1947), British guitarist
- Muriel Box (1905–1991), British writer
- Steve Box (born 1967), British animator
- Sydney Box (1907–1983), British film producer

== Science and technology ==
- Charles Richard Box (1866–1951), English physician and anatomist
- Don Box, Microsoft employee
- George E. P. Box (1919–2013), British statistician
- Jason Box, American glaciologist

== Sports ==
- Ab Box (1909–2000), Canadian football player
- Cloyce Box (1923–1993), American football player
- George Box (ice hockey) (1892–1962), Canadian ice hockey player
- Harold Box, rugby league player of the 1970s–1980s
- Kenneth Box (1930–2022), British track and field sprinter
- Peter Box (1932–2018), Australian rules footballer

== Other ==
- George Herbert Box (1869–1933), British Old Testament scholar, father of Pelham, uncle of George E.P.
- Godfrey Box, 16th century British entrepreneur
- John C. Box (1871–1941), American politician
- Mary Box, English school founder
- Pelham Horton Box (1898–1937), British historian
- Sidney Box (1873–1958), British trade unionist and political activist

== See also ==
- Box (disambiguation)
- Gillian Boxx (born 1973), American softball player
- Juice Boxx, stage name of Canadian drag queen Joseph "Jo" Primeau (born 1988)
- Pandora Boxx (born 1972), American drag queen, comedian, and reality television personality
- Shannon Boxx (born 1977), American soccer player
