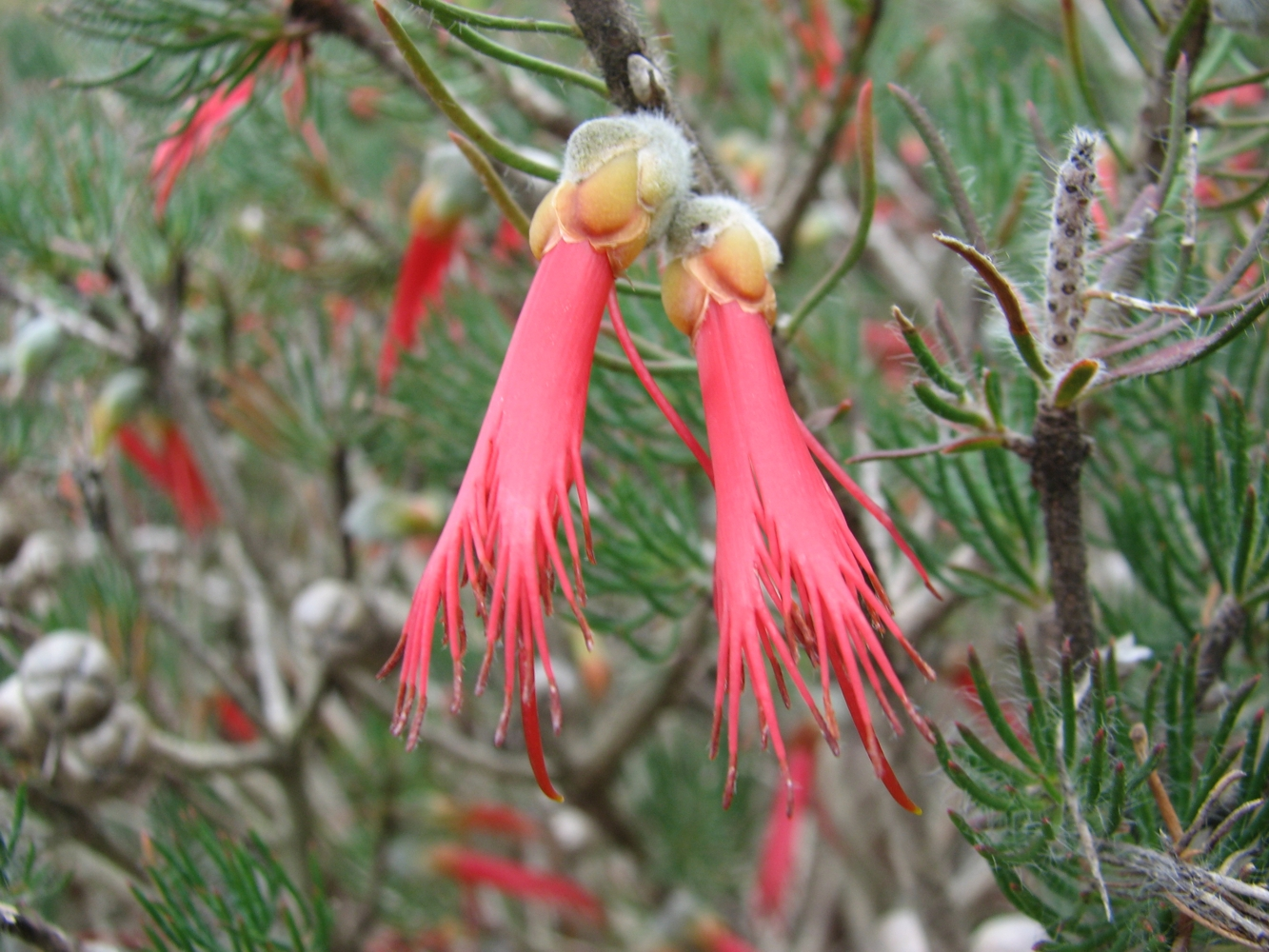
- In the Royal Botanic Gardens, Cranbourne

Scientific classification
- Kingdom: Plantae
- Clade: Tracheophytes
- Clade: Angiosperms
- Clade: Eudicots
- Clade: Rosids
- Order: Myrtales
- Family: Myrtaceae
- Genus: Calothamnus
- Species: C. sanguineus

Binomial name
- Calothamnus sanguineus Labill.

Synonyms
- Calothamnus blepharantherus F.Muell.; Calothamnus eriocarpus Lindl.; Melaleuca cruenta Craven & R.D.Edwards

= Calothamnus sanguineus =

Species of flowering plant

Calothamnus sanguineus, commonly known as silky-leaved blood flower, is a plant in the myrtle family, Myrtaceae and is endemic to the south-west of Western Australia. The Noongar peoples know the plant as Boolgalla. It is an erect to spreading shrub with short, cylindrical leaves and red or white flowers with an unusual arrangement of stamens, often flowering in autumn, winter or spring. It was the first of its genus to be formally described.

== Description ==
Calothamnus sanguineus is a shrub sometimes growing to a height of 2 metres (6.6 ft). Its leaves are 10–20 millimetres (0.4–0.8 in) long, circular in cross section and usually have many long, spreading hairs.

The flowers are bright red, sometimes white, and have 4 sepals, 4 petals and 4 claw-like bundles of stamens. The upper two bundles are much broader and longer than the lower two and the upper two are fused for much of their length. (Calothamnus torulosus has similar flowers but the upper stamen bundles are not fused in that species.) Flowering occurs from March to November and is followed by fruits which are woody capsules.

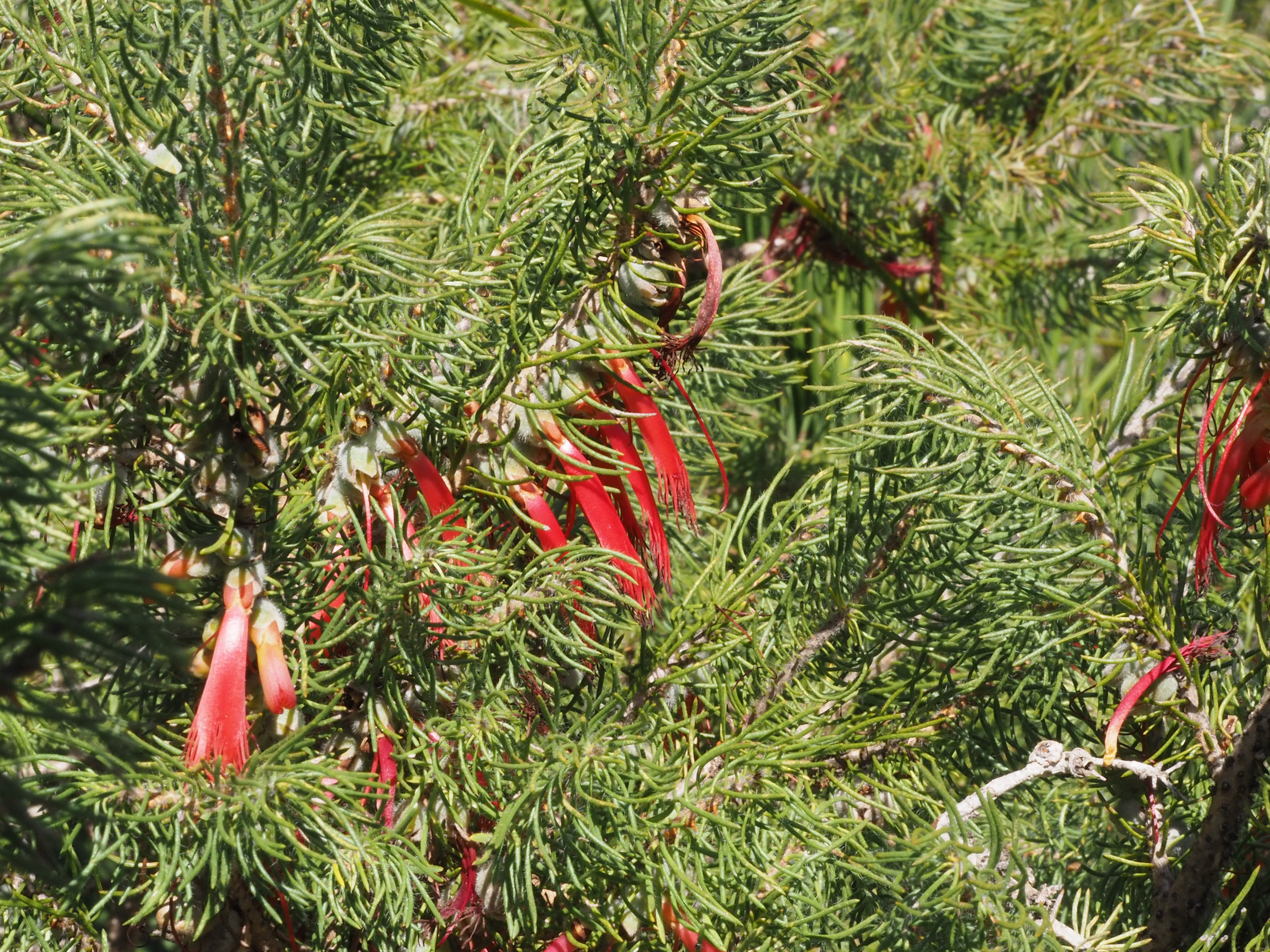
Leaves with spreading hairs

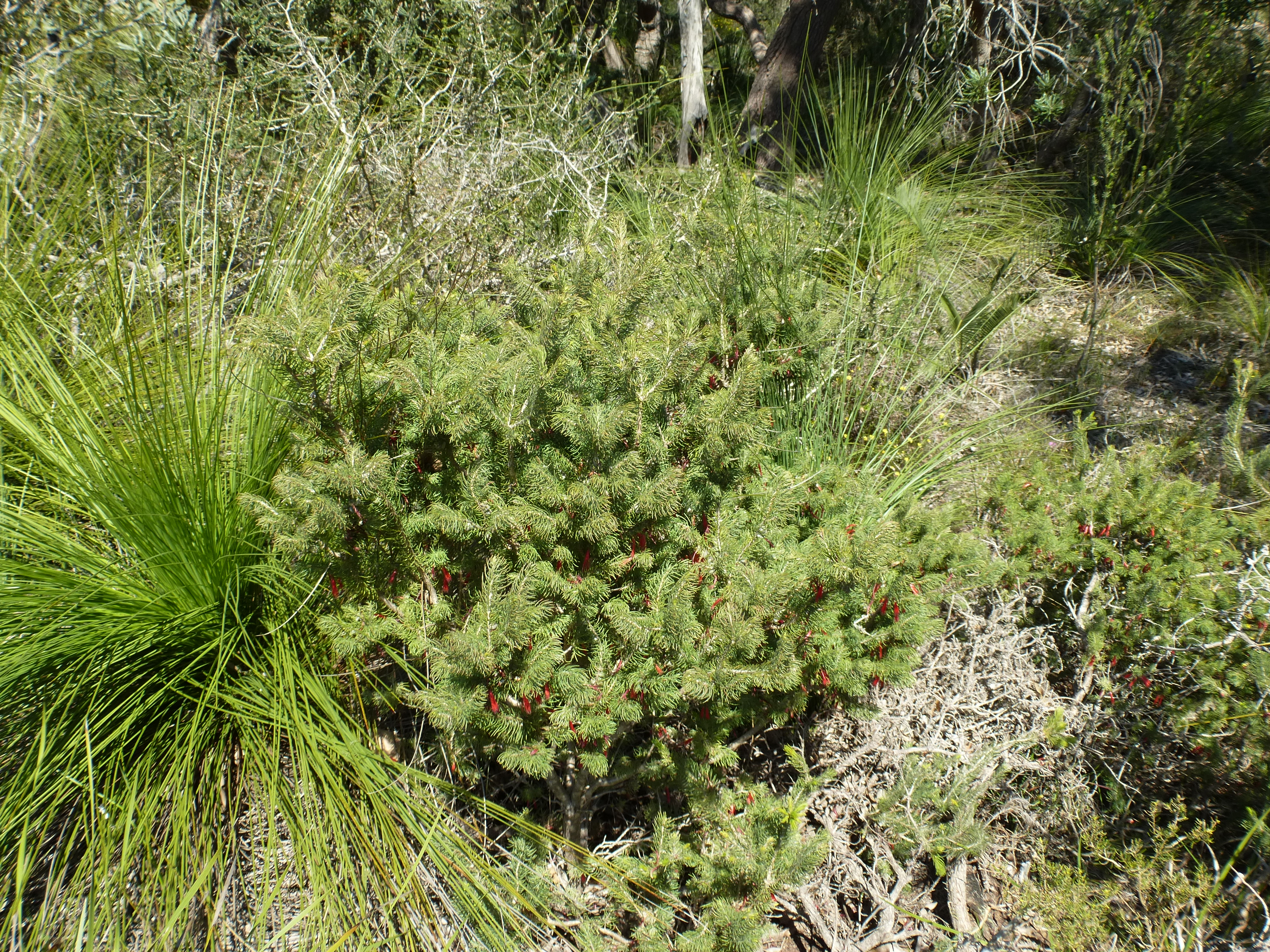
Habit

== Taxonomy and naming ==
Calothamnus sanguineus was first formally described by French naturalist Jacques Labillardière in 1806 in Novae Hollandiae Plantarum Specimen from a specimen he collected in the first few months of 1793 during the d'Entrecasteaux expedition. In 2014 Craven, Edwards and Cowley proposed that the species be renamed Melaleuca cruenta.

== Distribution and habitat ==
Calothamnus sanguineus is found from Cape Naturaliste to Kalbarri in the Avon Wheatbelt, Esperance Plains, Geraldton Sandplains, Jarrah Forest, Mallee, Swan Coastal Plain and Warren biogeographic regions. It occurs on sandplains, limestone ridges, and granite outcrops.

== Conservation ==
Calothamnus sanguineus is classified as "not threatened" by the Western Australian government department of parks and wildlife.
