= The Box =

The Box may refer to:

== Arts, entertainment, and media ==
=== Films ===
- The Box (1967 film), a 1967 Oscar-winning short animation by Fred Wolf
- The Box (1975 film), an Australian film based on the TV series of the same name
- The Box (2003 film), starring James Russo
- The Box (2007 film), starring Gabrielle Union
- The Box (2009 film), directed by Richard Kelly, starring Cameron Diaz
- The Box (2021 South Korean film), a South Korean film starring Park Chanyeol
- The Box (2021 Venezuelan film), directed by Lorenzo Vigas, starring Hernán Mendoza, released in Mexico

=== Literature ===
- The Box (Grass book), autobiography of Günter Grass
- The Box (Levinson book), nonfiction book by Marc Levinson
- The Box, a graphic novel by Joshua Starnes and Raymond Estrada

=== Music ===
- The Box (band), a new wave group from Montreal, Canada

==== Albums ====
- The Box (Chicago album), a box set by Chicago
- The Box (Van der Graaf Generator album), a box set by Van der Graaf Generator

==== Songs ====
- "The Box" (King Missile song), 1988
- "The Box" (Orbital song), 1996
- "The Box" (Randy Travis song), 1995
- "The Box" (Roddy Ricch song), 2019
- "The Box", a song from Johnny Flynn's 2008 album, A Larum
- "The Box", the opening track from Annihilator's 1994 studio album King of the Kill
- "The Box", a song by Fad Gadget, 1979
- "The Box", a song by Snot from the album Get Some, 1997

=== Television ===
==== Channels ====
- The Box (Dutch TV channel), a defunct Dutch music channel
  - The Box Comedy, a temporary Dutch comedy television channel during the transition of The Box (Dutch TV channel) to Comedy Central (Dutch TV channel)
- The Box (British and Irish TV channel), a music video channel formerly known as Video Jukebox Network
- The Box (American TV channel), a defunct American music video channel
- The Box, one of the names previously used by New Zealand television channel Sky Justice

==== Series ====
- The Box (2015 game show), a 2015 British cookery game show
- The Box (2026 game show), a 2026 British game show based on a Norwegian original
- The Box (Irish TV series), a 2006 Irish quiz show
- The Box (Australian TV series), a 1974–1977 Australian soap opera

==== Episodes ====
- "The Box" (Brooklyn Nine-Nine), 2018
- "The Box" (Fringe), 2010
- "The Box" (Rugrats episode), 1993
- "The Box" (The Amazing World of Gumball), 2017
- "The Box" (Star Wars: The Clone Wars), 2012
- "The Box", a 1997 episode of Recess
- "The Box", a 2013 Wander Over Yonder episode
- "The Box", a 2023 episode of Animator vs. Animation

=== Other uses in arts, entertainment, and media ===
- The Box (radio program), a weekly talk-radio program
- The Box, a custom-built steel guitar played by Paul Franklin
- The box or squawk box, British and American slang, respectively, for a television set

== Places ==
- The Box, Plymouth, a museum and art gallery
- The Box, a nickname for Area 51
- The Box, a narrow, high-walled part of the North Kaibab Trail in the Grand Canyon
- El Cajon, city in the state of California, United States
- The Box Soho, an X-rated club in Soho, London, and sister club to the Manhattan club

== See also ==
- Box (disambiguation)
- "Thinking outside the box", an expression meaning "thinking unconventionally"
