= Game box =

Game box may refer to:

- A package of a game
- Video game packaging
- GameBox, a video game console
- Gamebox 1.0, a 2004 American film

== See also ==
- Box game (disambiguation)
