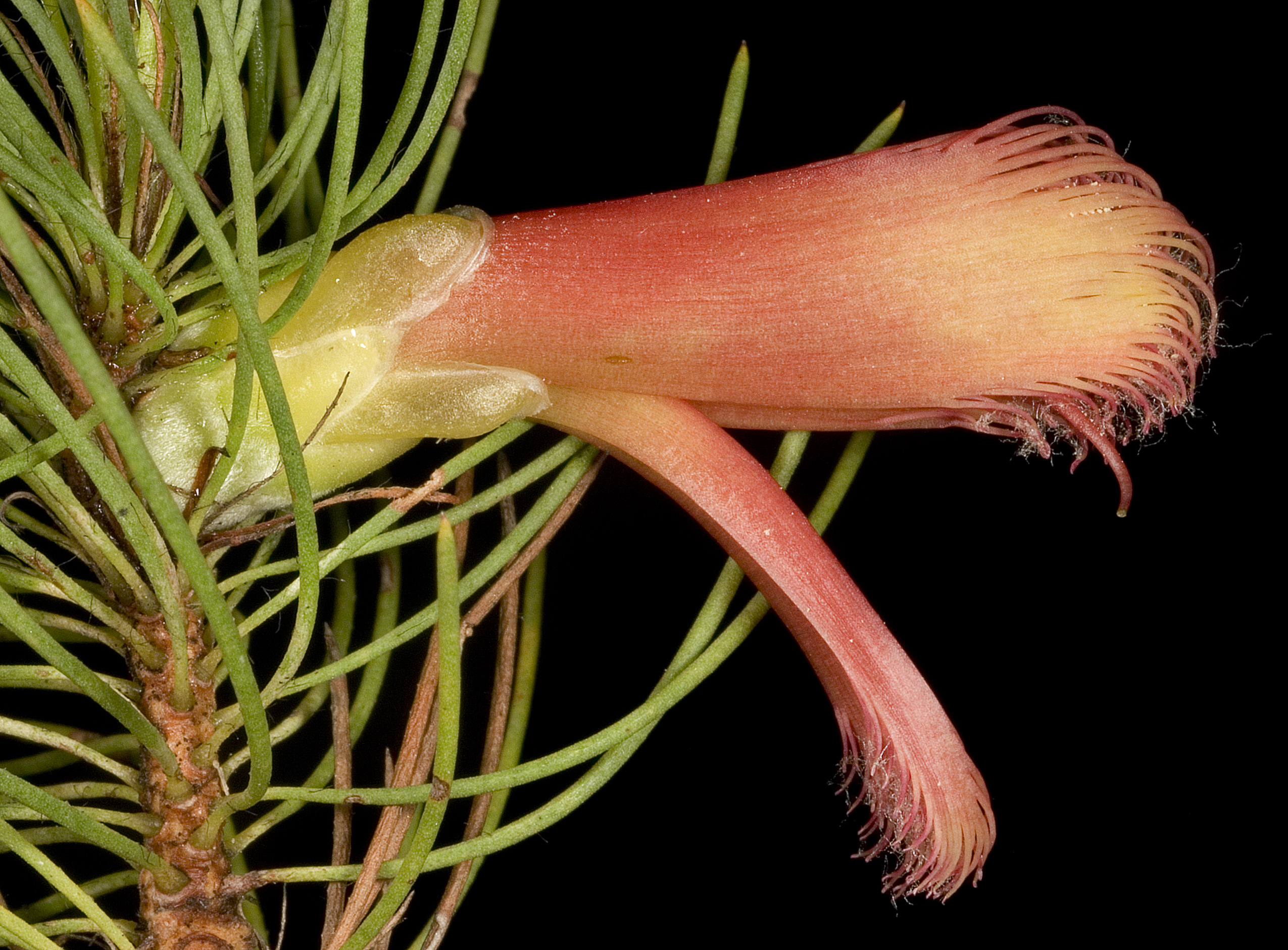

Scientific classification
- Kingdom: Plantae
- Clade: Tracheophytes
- Clade: Angiosperms
- Clade: Eudicots
- Clade: Rosids
- Order: Myrtales
- Family: Myrtaceae
- Genus: Calothamnus
- Species: C. torulosus

Binomial name
- Calothamnus torulosus Schauer

Synonyms
- Calothamnus torulosa Schauer orth. var.; Calothamnus torulosus Schauer var. torulosus; Melaleuca torulosa (Schauer) Craven & R.D.Edwards

= Calothamnus torulosus =

Species of flowering plant

Calothamnus torulosus is a plant in the myrtle family, Myrtaceae and is endemic to the south-west of Western Australia. It is sometimes an erect, sometimes prostrate shrub which has pine-like leaves and usually red, 4-part flowers. It is similar to Calothamnus sanguineus except that it has larger fruiting capsules.

== Description ==
Calothamnus torulosus grows to about 0.4 metres (1.3 ft) tall and has leaves that are about 20–50 millimetres (0.8–2 in) long. The leaves are circular in cross section and sometimes have a few scattered hairs.

The flowers are red or sometimes a shade of green to scarlet. They have 4 petals and 4 claw-like bundles of stamens with the upper 2 claws broad and flat, sometimes joined for part of their length. Unlike some others in the genus, the flowers and fruit are never buried in corky bark.

Flowering occurs from September to October and is followed by fruits which are woody, almost spherical capsules. The fruiting capsules have four prominently thickened lobes and are about 15 millimetres (0.6 in) long and wide.

== Taxonomy and naming ==
Calothamnus torulosus was first formally described by Johannes Schauer in 1843 in ''Dissertatio phytographica de Regelia, Beaufortia et Calothamno from a specimen collected "at the top of the hill at the foot of the mountains of the Darling Range, not far from the town Maddington", now a suburb of Perth. The specific epithet is derived from the Latin word torosus, meaning "bulging, muscular, fleshy or lusty".

== Distribution and habitat ==
Calothamnus torulosus occurs from Perth to Eneabba in the Geraldton Sandplains, Jarrah Forest and Swan Coastal Plain biogeographic regions, where it grows on sand and rocky soils derived from granite.

== Conservation ==
Calothamnus torulosus is classified as "not threatened" by the Western Australian Department of Parks and Wildlife.
