= Box, Design & Build =

New Zealand design and construction company

Box Design & Build
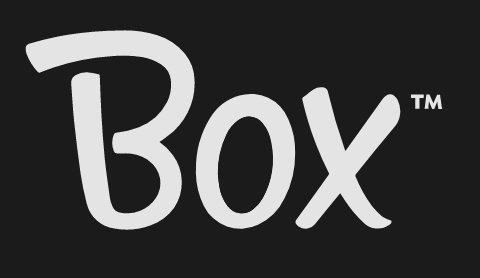
- Type: Private
- Founded: November 2011
- Founders: Dan Heyworth; Tim Dorrington; Nat Jakich; Nat Holloway
- Headquarters: Auckland, New Zealand
- Key people: Dan Heyworth
- Website: www.box.co.nz

Box Design & Build (also known as Box Living), is a design and construction company based in Auckland, New Zealand.

== History ==
Box was founded in November 2009 by entrepreneur Dan Heyworth, architect Tim Dorrington, builder Nat Jakich and surveyor Nat Holloway, as a platform of making architecturally designed homes for general public.

The company works on the building model with a post-and-beam exoskeleton with off-site construction and prefabrication, the residential work is based on mid-century modern movement.

A Box home in Hillsborough, Auckland featured on the TV show Grand Designs NZ in 2015.

In 2013 and 2016, the company was awarded New Zealand Institute of Architects award for a project design of a home and post-and-beam design of a multi-unit housing respectively.

In 2018 and 2019, the company won silver and gold awards for projects at the Regional Awards of the Registered Master Builders House of the Year competition.

In 2026 The company split into two entities Box Studio and Box Build.
