= The Box (Van der Graaf Generator album) =

Van der Graaf Generator album

The Box is a four CD box set by Van der Graaf Generator, containing recordings that had been released before, but also BBC-recordings and some live recordings that were never officially released before. It was released in 2000 by Virgin Records. Included in the sleeve notes are introductions by Guy Evans and Tony Banks from Genesis, a timeline of Van der Graaf Generator events from 1967 to 1978 (including a list of dates and places for every then-known concert by the band), an essay about the organs by Hugh Banton, an essay about Van der Graaf Generator compositions by Peter Hammill, an essay about saxophones by David Jackson and an essay about being a Van der Graaf Generator-aficionado by Ian Laycock.

Each of the CDs has its own title taken from a Hammill lyric for a song contemporaneous to the band period each particular disc represents. "Bless the Baby Born Today" is a line from "Darkness (11/11)", "The Tower Reels" is from "(In The) Black Room/The Tower", "One More Heaven Gained" is from "La Rossa", and "Like Something Out Of Edgar Allen Poe" [sic] is from "When She Comes".

== Track listing ==
Disc 1: Bless the Baby Born Today
No.	Title	Track source	Length
1.	"People You Were Going To"	BBC Top Gear 18/11/68	3:28
2.	"Afterwards"	BBC Top Gear 18/11/68	4:42
3.	"Necromancer"	BBC Top Gear 18/11/68	4:08
4.	"Refugees"	BBC Peel Session 14/12/71	6:16
5.	"Darkness (11/11)"	BBC Top Gear 27/01/70	6:50
6.	"After the Flood"	BBC Top Gear 27/01/70	10:56
7.	"White Hammer"	The Least We Can Do Is Wave to Each Other, 1970	8:13
8.	"House with No Door"	H to He, Who Am the Only One, 1970	6:28
9.	"Killer"	H to He, Who Am the Only One	8:17
10.	"Lost"	H to He, Who Am the Only One	11:09

Disc 2: The Tower Reels
No.	Title	Track source	Length
1.	"Theme 1"	BBC Black Session	2:58
2.	"W"	B-side of "Theme One", 1973	4:26
3.	"A Plague of Lighthouse Keepers"	Pawn Hearts, 1971	23:03
4.	"(In The) Black Room/The Tower"	Live Rimini 09/08/75	11:43
5.	"Lemmings"	Live Rimini 09/08/75	16:38
6.	"Man-Erg"	Live Rimini 09/08/75	11:10

Disc 3: One More Heaven Gained
No.	Title	Track source	Length
1.	"La Rossa"	Still Life, 1976	9:50
2.	"Arrow (Edit)"	Godbluff, 1975	8:51
3.	"Still Life"	Still Life	7:22
4.	"My Room (Edit)"	Still Life	7:25
5.	"Sleepwalkers"	Godbluff	10:25
6.	"Pilgrims"	Still Life	7:08
7.	"Childlike Faith In..."	Still Life	12:24
8.	"Scorched Earth"	Live Rimini 09/08/75	10:14

Disc 4: Like Something Out of Edgar Allen Poe
No.	Title	Track source	Length
1.	"Masks"	World Record, 1976	6:57
2.	"Meurglys III (Edit)"	World Record	16:44
3.	"When She Comes"	World Record	7:58
4.	"Wondering"	World Record	6:35
5.	"The Wave"	The Quiet Zone/The Pleasure Dome, 1977	3:11
6.	"Cat's Eye/Yellow Fever"	BBC Peel Session 24/10/77	4:45
7.	"Chemical World"	The Quiet Zone/The Pleasure Dome	6:10
8.	"Door"	Virgin Vault 25/07/77	3:23
9.	"Sci-Finance"	Vital, 1978	6:16
10.	"The Sphinx in the Face"	BBC Peel Session 24/10/77	5:33
