= Box Hill =

Box Hill or Boxhill may refer to:

== Places ==
=== Australia ===
- Box Hill, New South Wales, a suburb of Sydney, Australia
- Box Hill, Victoria, a suburb of Melbourne, Australia
  - Box Hill railway station, Melbourne

=== England ===
- Box Hill, Surrey, a hill in England named for the box woodland it features
  - Box Hill School, a public school located in Mickleham at the foot of the hill
  - Box Hill & Westhumble railway station
- Box Hill, Wiltshire, a village in England

=== Other countries ===
- Box Hill railway station, Wellington, a station in New Zealand
- Boxhill (Louisville), a historic house in the United States

== Other uses ==
- Box Hill (novel), a novel by Adam Mars-Jones
- SS Box Hill, previously known as SS Glentworth, a steamship sunk by a mine in the Second World War
