= George Box (ice hockey) =

Canadian ice hockey player

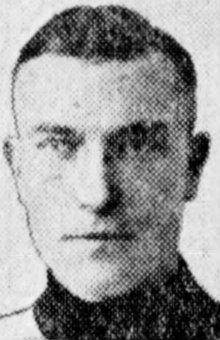
- Box with the Vancouver Young Liberals in 1922–23
- Born: October 27, 1892 Renfrew, Ontario, Canada
- Died: December 26, 1962 (aged 70)
- Height: 5 ft 10 in (178 cm)
- Weight: 150 lb (68 kg; 10 st 10 lb)
- Position: Right Wing
- Shot: Right
- Played for: Victoria Aristocrats
- Playing career: 1912–1925

George Stacey "Trooper" Box (October 27, 1892 – December 26, 1962) was a Canadian professional ice hockey player. He played for the Victoria Aristocrats in the Pacific Coast Hockey Association during the 1915–16 and 1918–19 seasons. In between his stints with the Aristocrats Box saw military service in WW1, hence his nickname "Trooper".

Box also played for various teams in the Vancouver City Senior Hockey League (VCSHL) and in the Vancouver Commercial Hockey League.
