= Royal Botanic Gardens, Cranbourne =

Botanical gardens in Melbourne, Australia

Royal Botanic Gardens Victoria
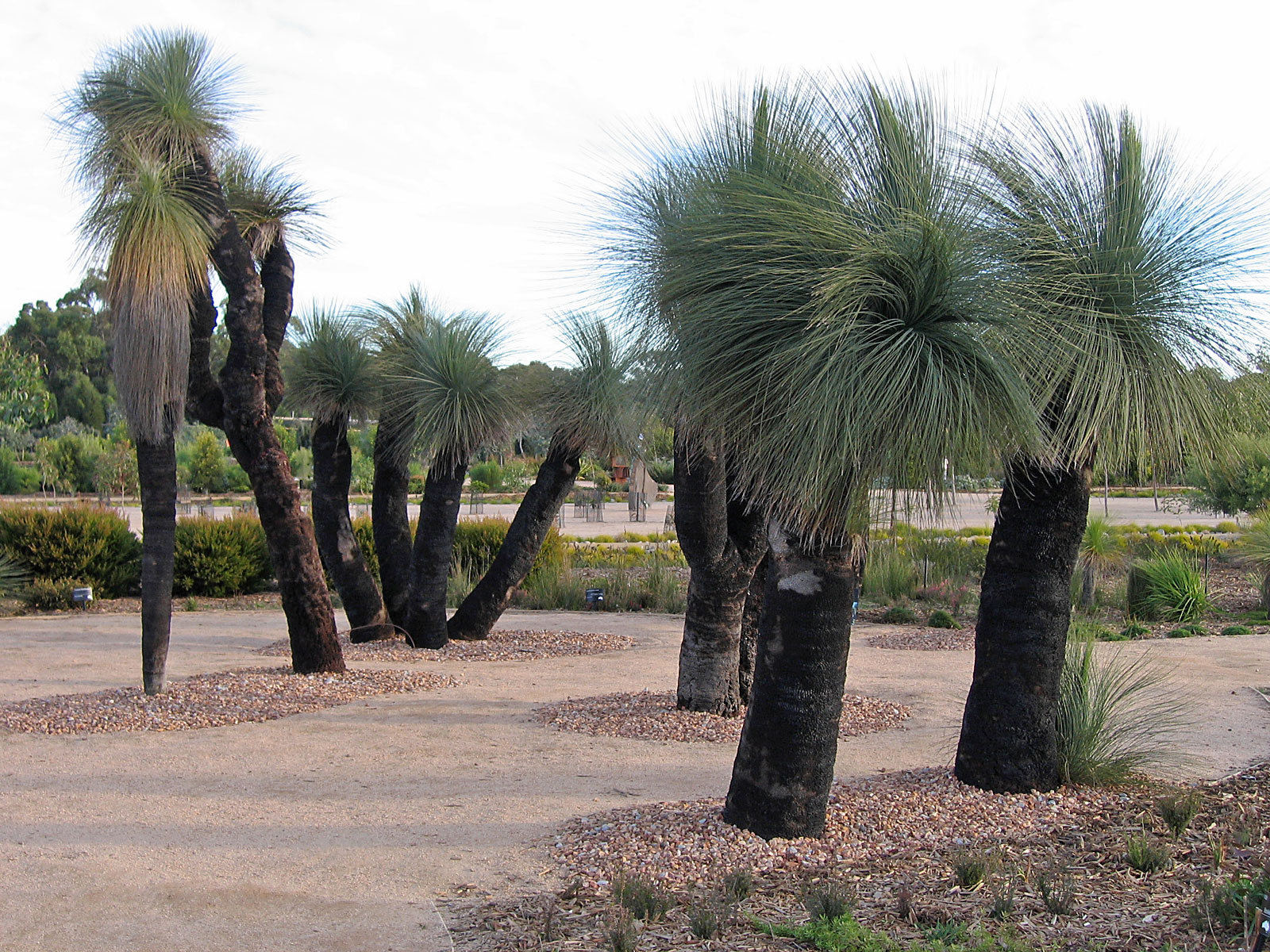
- Kingia australis in the gardens

- Location within Melbourne
- Interactive map of Royal Botanic Gardens Victoria
- Type: Botanical gardens
- Location: Cranbourne, Melbourne, Victoria, Australia
- Coordinates: 38°07′44″S 145°16′55″E
- Area: 363 ha (900 acres)
- Established: c. 1970
- Opened: 1989; 37 years ago
- Owner: Victorian Government (as crown land)
- Open: 9:00am to 5:00pm (Daylight saving may extend closing)
- Status: Open; entry is free
- Awards: World Architecture Festival, 2013; AILA Excellence Award, 2014
- Paths: 10 km (6.2 mi); unsealed
- Habitats: Heathlands; wetlands; woodlands; deserts; rainforests
- Vegetation: Australian native
- Public transit: – Cranbourne + free shuttle
- Facilities: Information centre; gift shop; toilets; barbecues; picnic areas; barbecues; cafe; walking trails
- Website: rbg.vic.gov.au

The Royal Botanic Gardens Victoria at Cranbourne Gardens is a 363-hectare (900-acre) botanic garden located in the eponymous suburb of Cranbourne, approximately 45 km (28 mi) south-east of the city centre of Melbourne in Victoria, Australia.

The gardens are part of the Royal Botanic Gardens Victoria, with the smaller, yet older, garden site being the 38-hectare (94-acre) botanic gardens in the city centre, founded in 1846. Opened in 1989, the Cranbourne gardens specialise in Australian native plants, and the setting of the gardens includes heathlands, wetlands and woodlands. The gardens are recognised as a habitat of State significance for plant and wildlife conservation, and are home to over 25 endangered or rare and threatened species.

A focal point of Cranbourne gardens is the Australian Garden that features a number of exhibition gardens, sculptures, and displays aimed to bring the beauty and diversity of the Australian landscape and plants.

The site includes a visitor information service, guided walks and educational programs, volunteer master gardeners to help with advice on the use of Australian plants, a gift shop, and a licensed café. In the bushland section, there are 10 kilometres (6.2 mi) of walking tracks, a lookout tower, secluded picnic sites, and free barbecues.

== History ==
The indigenous Australian Boon Wurrung people inhabited the area around Cranbourne in pre-European times. The site of Cranbourne Gardens was used for sand mining from the 1920s, largely to supply the building of Melbourne and its suburbs. The military used the site from 1889 until 1953, with private licences also issued for sand mining, grazing and timber gathering.

In 1970 the site was named as a division of the Royal Botanic Gardens Victoria, with a focus on Australian plant research and conservation. The gardens were opened to the public in 1989.

== The Australian Garden ==
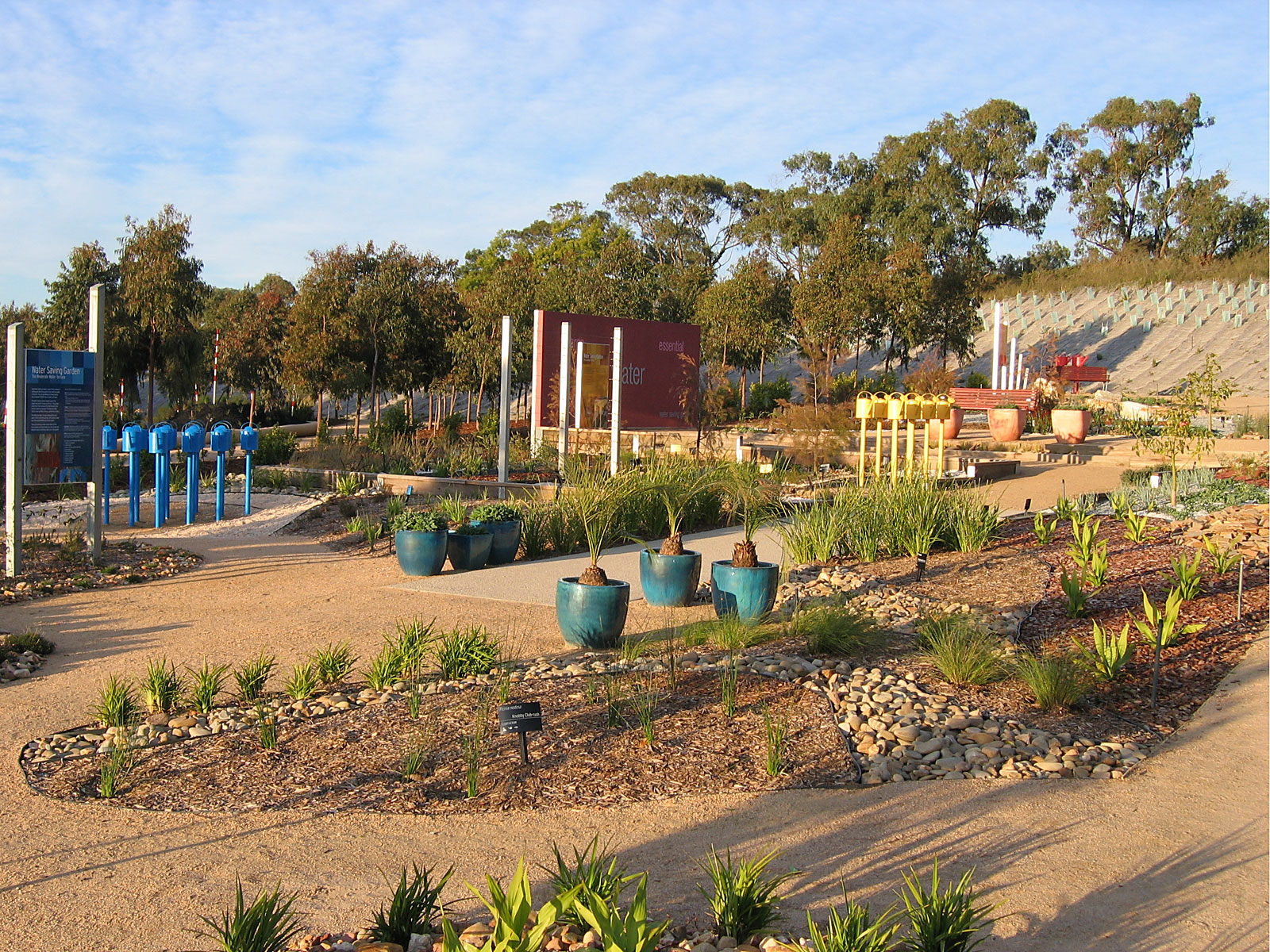
The Water Saving exhibition garden

The Australian Garden aims to allow visitors to explore people's place in the Australian environment and to learn more about Australian plants. It features approximately 100,000 plants spread across twenty-one landscape displays and exhibition gardens. Opened on 28 May 2006 and attracted 15,000 visitors on that day, the garden was expanded in 2012 and has since won several landscape design awards, including at the World Architecture Festival in 2013.

=== Red Sand Garden ===
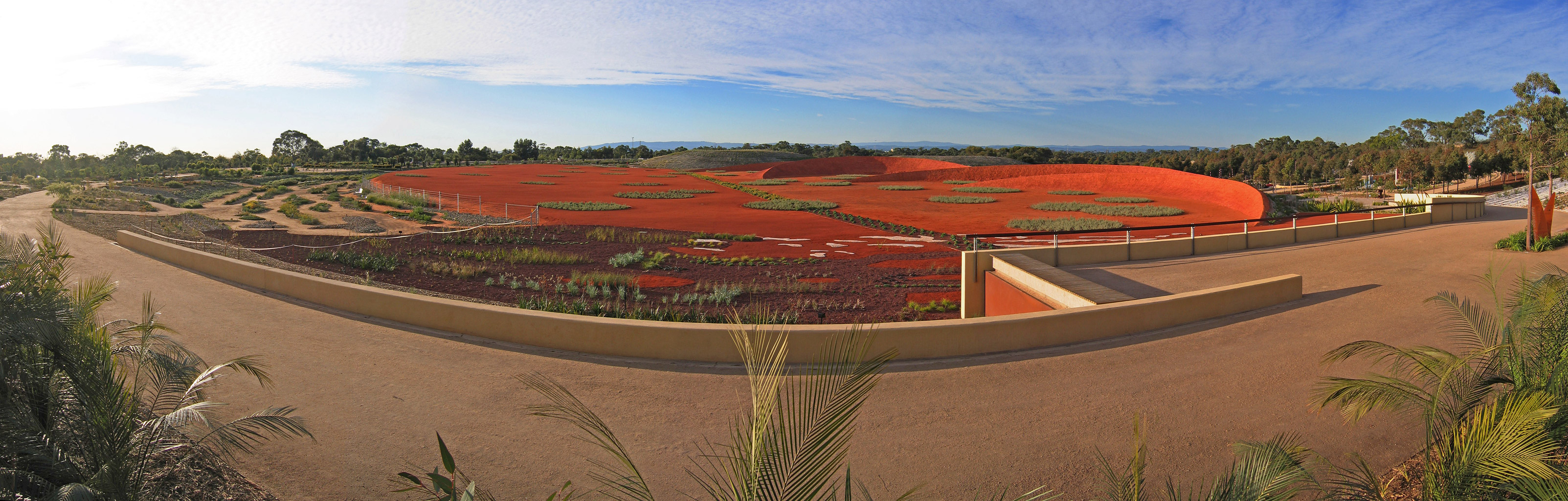
Panoramic view of the Red Sand Garden.

A central feature of the Australian Garden is the Red Sand Garden that features vibrant red sand with circles of saltbush and crescent shaped mounds designed to echo the shapes and colours found in Central Australia. The garden is designed to show seasonal flushes of wildflowers, as seen in the deserts of Central Australia.

=== Exhibition Gardens ===
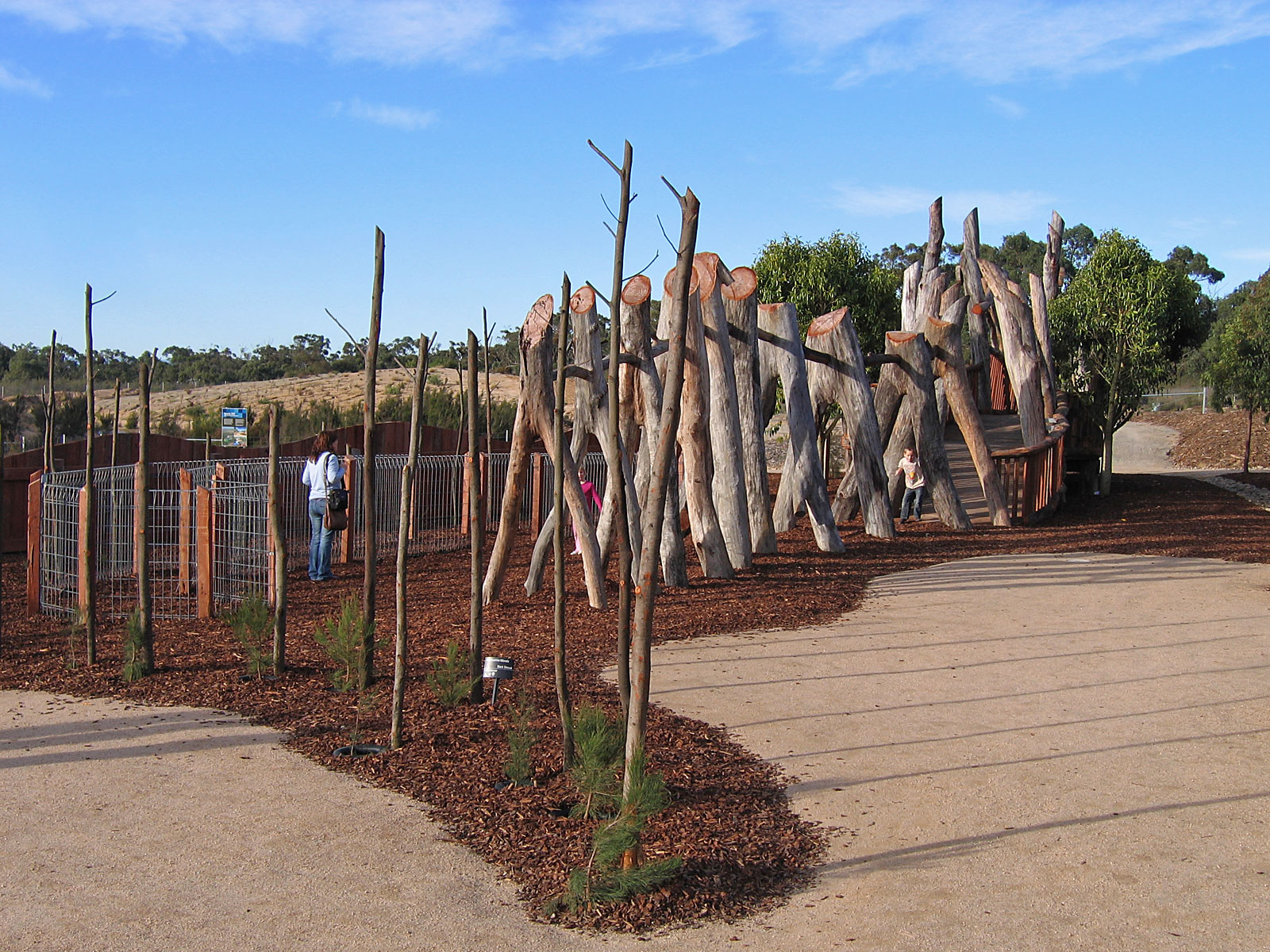
The Kid's Backyard exhibition garden

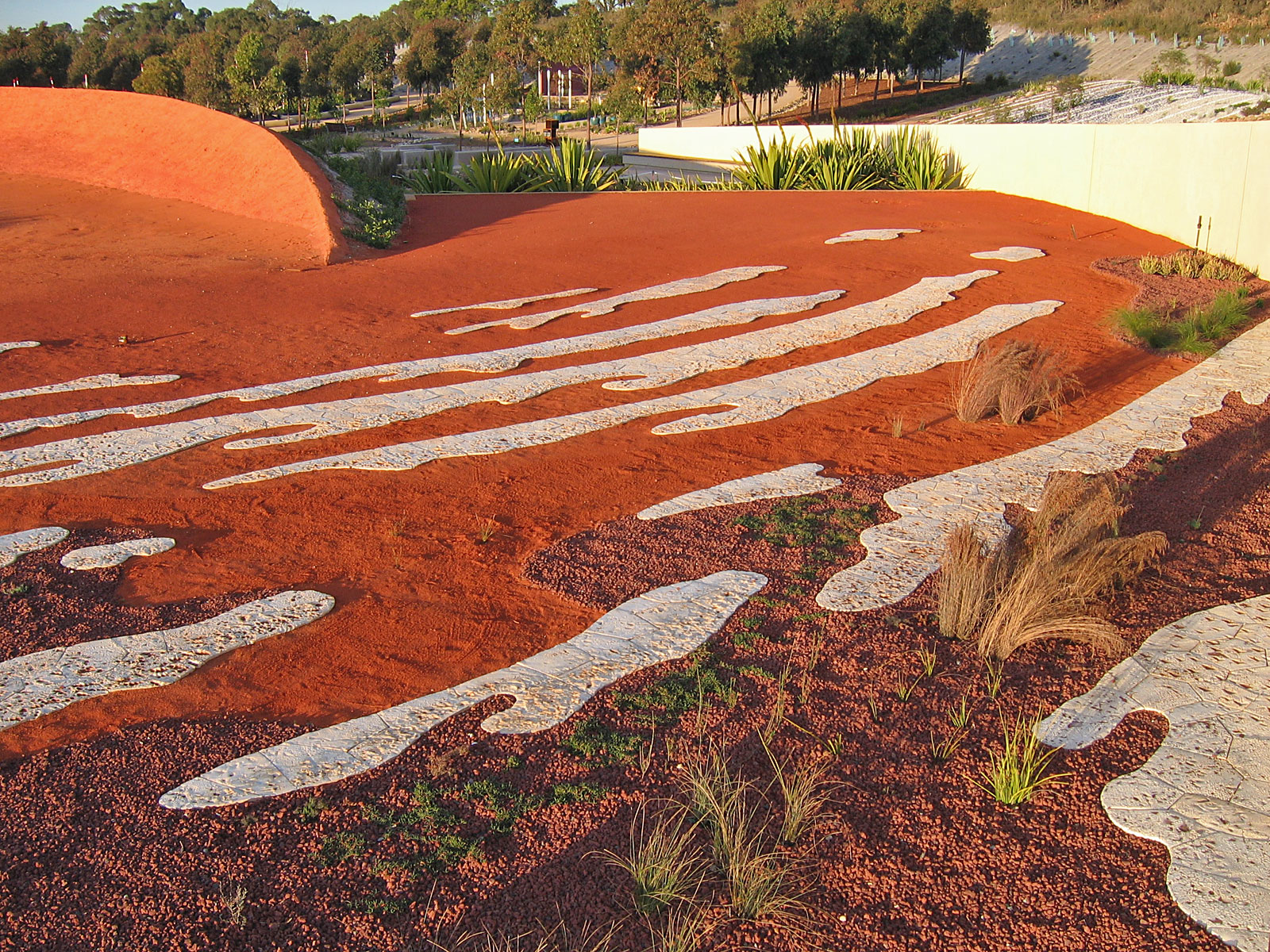
The Ephemeral Lake Sculpture in the Red Sand Garden

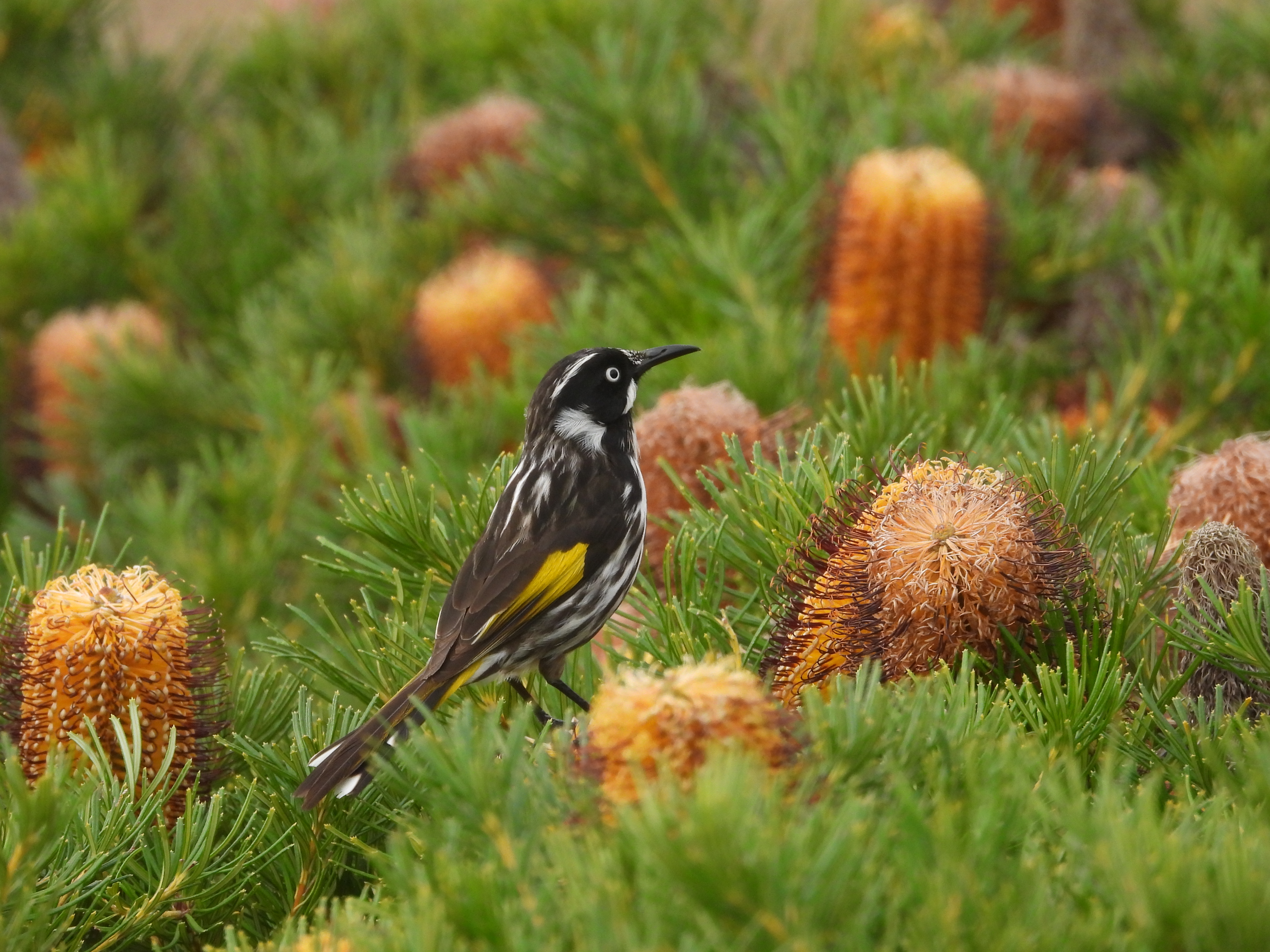
New Holland Honeyeater are a common sight in the Banksia gardens.

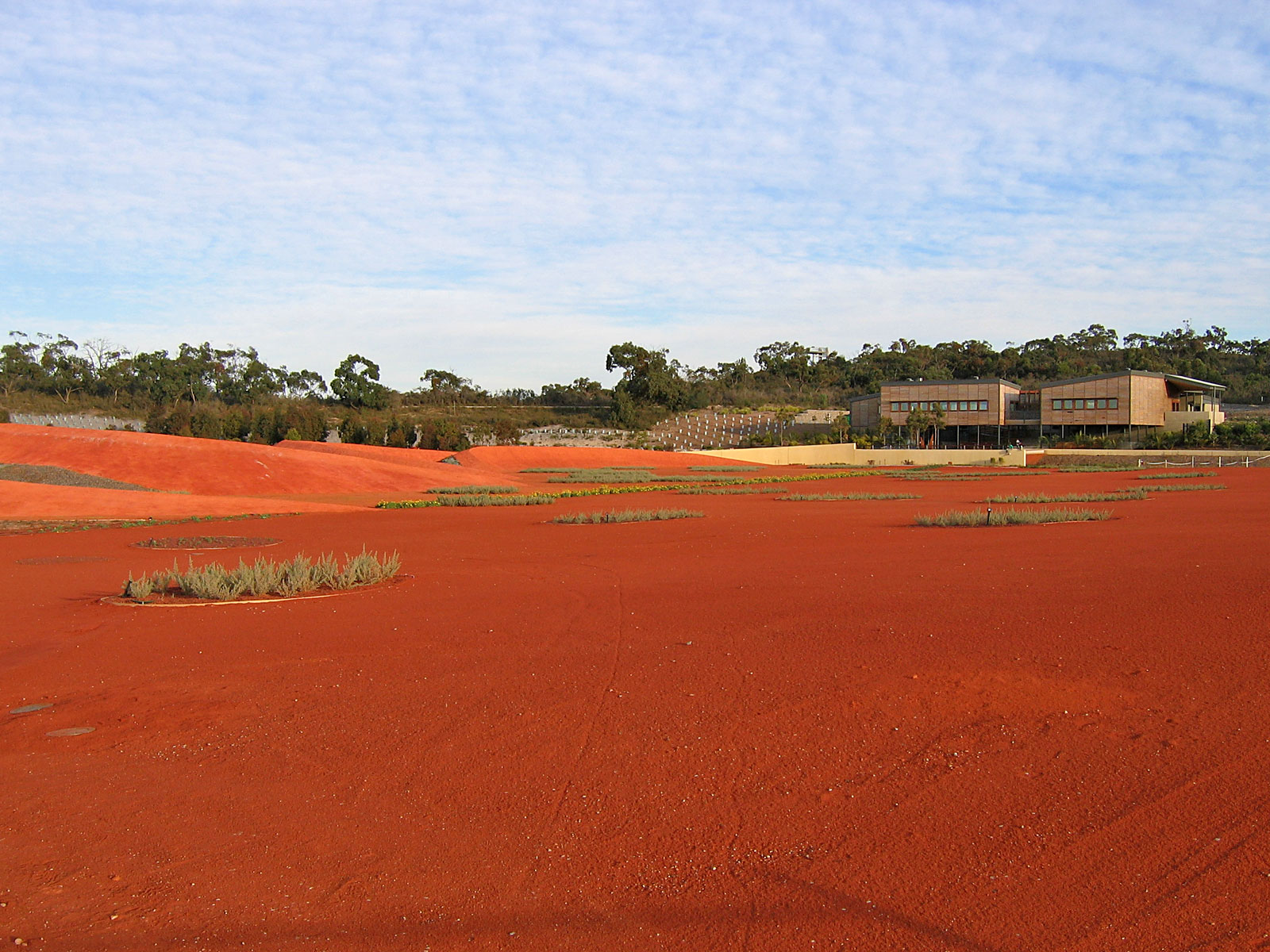
Looking across the Red Sand Garden to the Visitor's Centre

There are five exhibition gardens aiming to demonstrate ways that Australian native plants can be used in the home garden:

- Diversity Garden – illustrates a variety of native plants from various climatic zones in Australia.
- Water Saving Garden – shows how to group plants with similar water needs and choose plants which require minimum watering in a garden.
- Future Garden – features various alternate ways of gardening, such as special plant choices and novel mulches.
- Home Garden – shows a number of gardens featuring native plants for some common types of homes found in Australia.
- Kid's Backyard – uses natural plant materials recycled into a children's play area rather than the common plastic and metal constructions commonly found in Australian backyards.

=== Arid Garden and Dry River Bed ===
These gardens demonstrate the role of water in the Australian landscape. Many parts of Australia are prone to alternating drought and flood. Thus plants have had to evolve to cope with extended periods of intense heat and dry aridity, and with either seasonal or irregular copious supplies of water.

=== Eucalypt Walk ===
Eucalypts are an omnipresent feature of the Australian landscape, with around 700 species found in virtually all habitats. The Eucalypt Walk features five gardens displaying some well known eucalypt species, the Ironbark garden, the Box garden, the Peppermint garden, the Bloodwood Garden, and the Stringybark garden. In 2007, it was reported that the oldest trees were planted in c. 2005.

=== Other features ===
The Rockpool Waterway and the Escarpment Wall are inspired by the types of waterways and escarpments that may be found in parts of central Australia, such as Uluru and Kings Canyon. There is also a display of Australian orchids in an undercroft below the Visitor's Centre, the Serpentine Path, and a Desert Discovery Camp in the Arid Garden for children to play and learn.

== Visitor information ==
Opening hours

Cranbourne Gardens are open from 9:00 am to 5:00 pm every day of the year except for Christmas Day. Entry to the gardens is free. The bushland areas of the gardens are closed when a Total Fire Ban is in place.

Access

Cranbourne Gardens are at 1000 Ballarto Rd, Cranbourne. Access by private vehicle is via the South Gippsland Highway (east entrance) or via Ballarto Rd (West) (west entrance). Cranbourne is reasonably well served by public transportation, with a train line from Melbourne and a number of local bus routes. There is a free shuttle bus service from Cranbourne railway station to the gardens; and pre-booking is required.

== See also ==
- Parks and gardens of Melbourne
- List of botanical gardens in Victoria
