= Ten Years After discography =

- Studio albums: 12
- Live albums: 10
- Compilation albums: 13
- Singles: 27
- Video albums: 3
- Box sets: 5

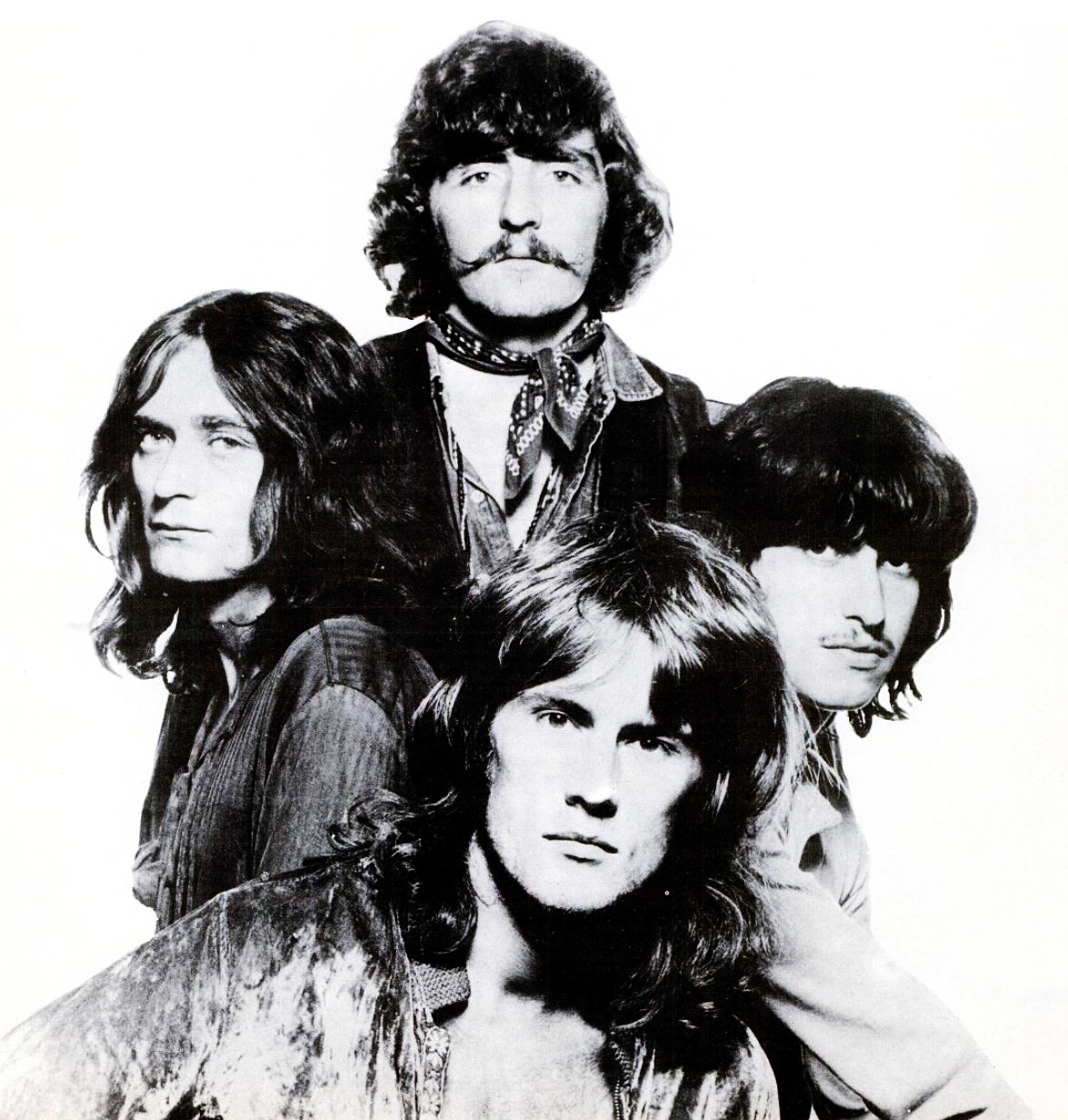
Trade ad for Ten Years After's single "Love Like A Man".

This is the discography of British rock band Ten Years After.

== Albums ==
=== Studio albums ===
Title	Album details	Peak chart positions										Certifications
Title	Album details	UK	AUS	CAN	DEN	FIN	GER	ITA	NOR	SWE	US	Certifications
Ten Years After	Released: 27 October 1967; Label: Deram; Formats: LP	—	—	—	—	—	—	—	—	—	—	
Stonedhenge	Released: 7 February 1969; Label: Deram; Formats: LP, 8-track, reel-to-reel	6	—	—	—	—	—	—	—	—	61	
Ssssh	Released: 26 September 1969; Label: Deram; Formats: LP, 4-track, 8-track, reel-to-reel	4	—	17	—	14	6	—	16	—	20	CAN: Gold
Cricklewood Green	Released: 17 April 1970; Label: Deram; Formats: LP, MC, 8-track, reel-to-reel	4	19	11	5	8	8	17	8	—	14	
Watt	Released: December 1970; Label: Deram; Formats: LP, MC, 8-track, reel-to-reel	5	13	16	7	7	9	8	8	13	21	
A Space in Time	Released: August 1971; Label: Chrysalis, Columbia; Formats: LP, MC, 8-track, reel-to-reel	36	18	21	8	11	35	—	13	9	17	CAN: Gold; US: Platinum
Rock & Roll Music to the World	Released: September 1972; Label: Chrysalis, Columbia; Formats: LP, MC, 8-track	27	—	19	2	22	30	—	15	8	43	
Positive Vibrations	Released: April 1974; Label: Chrysalis, Columbia; Formats: LP, MC, 8-track	—	84	78	15	—	—	—	18	11	81	
About Time	Released: 28 August 1989; Label: Chrysalis; Formats: CD, LP, MC	—	—	—	—	—	87	—	—	—	120	
Now	Released: July 2004; Label: Ten Years After; Formats: CD	—	—	—	—	—	—	—	—	—	—	
Evolution	Released: November 2008; Label: Ten Years After; Formats: CD	—	—	—	—	—	—	—	—	—	—	
A Sting in the Tale	Released: 20 October 2017; Label: Ten Years After; Formats: CD, digital download	—	—	—	—	—	—	—	—	—	—	
"—" denotes releases that did not chart or were not released in that territory.

=== Live albums ===
Title	Album details	Peak chart positions									
Title	Album details	UK	AUS	CAN	DEN	FIN	GER	IT	NOR	SWE	US
Undead	Released: July 1968; Label: Deram; Formats: LP, MC, 8-track	26	—	—	—	—	—	—	—	—	115
Recorded Live	Released: June 1973; Label: Chrysalis, Columbia; Formats: 2xLP, 2xMC, 8-track	36	42	28	23	28	10	25	9	11	39
The Friday Rock Show Sessions – Live At Reading '83	Released: 1990; Label: Raw Fruit; Formats: CD, LP, MC	—	—	—	—	—	—	—	—	—	—
Live 1990	Released: 28 June 1993; Label: Code 90; Formats: CD	—	—	—	—	—	—	—	—	—	—
Live at the Fillmore East 1970	Released: July 2001; Label: Chrysalis; Formats: 2xCD	—	—	—	—	—	—	—	—	—	—
One Night Jammed	Released: September 2003; Label: Fast Western; Formats: CD	—	—	—	—	—	—	—	—	—	—
Roadworks	Released: August 2005; Label: Ten Years After; Formats: 2xCD	—	—	—	—	—	—	—	—	—	—
The Name Remains the Same	Released: 2014; Label: Kultopolis; Formats: CD, digital download	—	—	—	—	—	—	—	—	—	—
Naturally Live	Released: 6 September 2019; Label: Fast Western; Formats: CD, 2xLP, digital download	—	—	—	—	—	—	—	—	—	—
Live at Anti WAA Festival 1989	Released: 13 July 2021; Label: Nibelung; Formats: digital download	—	—	—	—	—	—	—	—	—	—
Woodstock 1969	Released: 16 August 2024; Label: Chrysalis; Formats: CD	—	—	—	—	—	—	—	—	—	—
"—" denotes releases that did not chart or were not released in that territory.

=== Compilation albums ===
Title	Album details	Peak chart positions		
Title	Album details	CAN	DEN	US
Double Deluxe	Released: 1970; Label: Deram; Formats: 2xLP; Japan-only release	—	—	—
Alvin Lee and Company	Released: March 1972; Label: Deram; Formats: LP, MC, 8-track	60	9	55
Goin' Home!	Released: May 1975; Label: Chrysalis, Deram; Formats: LP, MC, 8-track	—	—	174
The Classic Performances of Ten Years After	Released: October 1976; Label: Chrysalis, Columbia; Formats: LP, MC	—	—	—
Greatest Hits	Released: July 1977; Label: London; Formats: LP, MC	—	—	—
Ten Years After	Released: May 1980; Label: Pickwick; Formats: LP, MC	—	—	—
Hear Me Calling	Released: 13 February 1981; Label: Decca; Formats: LP	—	—	—
The Collection	Released: November 1985; Label: Castle Communications; Formats: 2xLP, 2xMC	—	—	—
Portfolio	Released: 9 May 1988; Label: Chrysalis; Formats: CD, 2xLP, MC	—	—	—
The Essential Ten Years After Collection	Released: 27 August 1991; Label: Chrysalis; Formats: CD, MC	—	—	—
Pure Blues	Released: September 1995; Label: Chrysalis; Formats: CD, MC	—	—	—
Solid Rock	Released: September 1997; Label: Chrysalis; Formats: CD	—	—	—
The Anthology (1967–1971)	Released: 9 April 2002; Label: Hip-O; Formats: 2xCD; US-only release	—	—	—
"—" denotes releases that did not chart or were not released in that territory.

=== Box sets ===
Title	Album details	Peak chart positions		
Title	Album details	BEL (WA)	GER	SWI
The Originals	Released: 1995; Label: EMI/Chrysalis; Formats: 3xCD	—	—	—
Think About the Times: The Chrysalis Years 1969–1972	Released: 26 July 2010; Label: Chrysalis; Formats: 3xCD	—	—	—
Original Album Series	Released: 4 August 2014; Label: Chrysalis; Formats: 5xCD	—	—	—
The Triple Album Collection	Released: December 2014; Label: Warner Music/Chrysalis; Formats: 3xCD	—	—	—
Ten Years After 1967–1974	Released: December 2017; Label: Chrysalis; Formats: 10xCD	158	28	54
"—" denotes releases that did not chart or were not released in that territory.

=== Video albums ===
Title	Album details
Goin' Home	Released: 1983; Label: Hendring; Formats: VHS
Live at Marquee	Released: August 1990; Label: Vap; Formats: LaserDisc; Japan-only release
Live Legends	Released: 1990; Label: Castle Music Pictures; Formats: VHS, LaserDisc

== Singles ==
Title	Year	Peak chart positions										Album
Title	Year	UK	AUT	BEL (FL)	BEL (WA)	CAN	DEN	GER	IRE	NL	US	Album
"Portable People"	1968	—	—	—	—	—	—	—	—	—	—	Non-album singles
"Rock Your Mama" (Note: "Rock Your Mama" was scheduled for release in the UK, but was not released there. It was released elsewhere in Europe and Japan.)	1968	—	—	—	—	—	—	—	—	—	—	Non-album singles
"I'm Going Home" (live '68) / "Hear Me Calling" (Note: "Hear Me Calling" was released as the A-side in some countries. "I'm Going Home" charted in Belgium and the Netherlands after being reissued there in 1971.)	1968	—	—	—	28	—	—	—	—	11	—	Undead
"Spoonful" (Note: Only released in Japan.)	1969	—	—	—	—	—	—	—	—	—	—	Ten Years After
"A Sad Song"	1969	—	—	—	—	—	—	—	—	—	—	Stonedhenge
"I Woke Up This Morning"	1969	—	—	—	—	—	—	—	—	—	—	Ssssh
"Bad Scene" (Note: Only released in Spain.)	1970	—	—	—	—	—	—	—	—	—	—	Ssssh
"Good Morning Little School Girl"	1970	—	—	—	—	—	—	—	—	—	—	Ssssh
"Love Like a Man"	1970	10	8	26	33	56	15	9	13	19	98	Cricklewood Green
"Working on the Road" (Note: Only released in France, Belgium and Japan.)	1970	—	—	—	—	—	—	—	—	—	—	Cricklewood Green
"I'm Coming On" (Note: Only released in Continental Europe and Japan)	1971	—	—	—	—	—	—	47	—	—	—	Watt
"I'd Love to Change the World" (Note: Only released in Continental Europe, North America and Japan.)	1971	—	—	—	—	10	—	—	—	—	40	A Space in Time
"Baby Won't You Let Me Rock 'n Roll You" (Note: Only released in Europe, North America and Australasia.)	1971	—	—	—	—	54	—	—	—	—	61	A Space in Time
"One of These Days"	1972	—	—	—	—	—	—	—	—	—	—	A Space in Time
"The Sounds" (Note: Only released in France.)	1972	—	—	—	—	—	—	—	—	—	—	Alvin Lee and Company
"You Can't Win Them All" (Note: Only released in Continental Europe.)	1972	—	—	—	—	—	—	—	—	—	—	Rock & Roll Music to the World
"Rock 'n' Roll Music to the World" (Note: Only released in Continental Europe and Japan.)	1972	—	—	—	—	—	—	—	—	—	—	Rock & Roll Music to the World
"Choo Choo Mama" (Note: Only released in North America. and New Zealand)	1972	—	—	—	—	—	—	—	—	—	89	Rock & Roll Music to the World
"Tomorrow I'll Be Out of Town" (Note: Only released in North America.)	1973	—	—	—	—	—	—	—	—	—	—	Rock & Roll Music to the World
"Standing at the Station"	1973	—	—	—	—	—	—	—	—	—	—	Rock & Roll Music to the World
"I'm Going Home" (live '73) (Note: Only released in Europe, North America and Australia.)	1973	—	—	—	—	—	—	—	—	—	—	Recorded Live
"It's Getting Harder" (Note: Only released in North America and the Netherlands.)	1974	—	—	—	—	—	—	—	—	— (Note: "It's Getting Harder" did not enter the Dutch Single Top 30, but did peak at number 15 on the Single Tip chart.)	—	Positive Vibrations
"Stone Me"	1974	—	—	—	—	—	—	—	—	—	—	Positive Vibrations
"Going Back to Birmingham"	1974	—	—	—	—	—	—	—	—	—	—	Positive Vibrations
"Let's Shake It Up" (Note: Only released in Australia and promotionally in the US.)	1989	—	—	—	—	—	—	—	—	—	— (Note: "Let's Shake It Up" did not enter the Billboard Hot 100, but did peak at number 23 on the Album Rock Tracks chart.)	About Time
"Highway of Love"	1989	—	—	—	—	—	—	—	—	—	—	About Time
"Suranne Suranne"	2017	—	—	—	—	—	—	—	—	—	—	A Sting in the Tale
"—" denotes releases that did not chart or were not released in that territory.
