= Fata Morgana (2007 film) =

- Directed by: Simon Groß
- Written by: Simon Groß; Nana Ekvtimishvili; Stefan Stabenow
- Produced by: Fritjof Hohagen; Karim Debbagh
- Starring: Matthias Schweighöfer; Marie Zielcke; Jean-Hugues Anglade
- Cinematography: Peter Steuger
- Edited by: Stefan Stabenow
- Music by: Mariana Bernoski
- Distributed by: enigma film
- Release date: 16 August 2007
- Running time: 88 minutes
- Country: Germany
- Language: German

Fata Morgana is a 2007 German film directed by Simon Groß and starring Matthias Schweighöfer, Marie Zielcke and Jean-Hugues Anglade. The film is about a young couple ending up lost in the desert and being forced to trust a shady stranger to lead them back to civilisation.

== Plot ==
Daniel (Matthias Schweighöfer) and Laura (Marie Zielcke) are a young couple vacationing in Morocco. They rent an off-road vehicle for a day trip to the desert. At a gas station they meet a shady stranger (Jean-Hugues Anglade), who offers them to show them the desert. Declining his offer the two continue their trip and spontaneously decide to veer off the road. After making love on a dune they find out that their vehicle does not start. They set out on foot, but are soon lost as their tracks have been blown away by the wind.

Luckily the tight-lipped stranger appears out of nowhere and helps them repair their vehicle and promises to show them the way out of the desert. They follow him on his motorbike with their vehicle but become suspicious of motives when they find out that he seemingly leads them away from the road. Tensions appear, not only between the couple and the stranger, but also between Daniel and Laura. When Daniel walks away from the vehicle after having an argument with Laura, the stranger seduces Laura and makes love with her. Daniel, who senses what has happened, punctures the tires of the stranger's motorbike with a knife. Together the couple drives away, arguing on the way. When they reach an ancient and deserted town in the middle of the desert Laura walks away. Daniel tries to find her in the narrow alleys of the town, but suddenly encounters the stranger, who has seemingly followed them. He draws his knife and attacks the stranger, but is soon disarmed. Laura comes to his help and strikes the stranger with a stone on his head. They try to bring the stranger to a hospital, but ultimately leave him in the desert after being convinced that he is dead. Following power poles they drive back to the road. A few days later they return to the place where the left the stranger. They only find a bloody bandage and footprints leading away from the place.

== Awards and nominations ==
At the 2007 Munich Film Festival, Fata Morgana received the Young German Cinema Award for Best Direction, recognizing director Simon Groß for his work on the film. The award is given to emerging filmmakers in Germany to highlight new talent in the industry.

At the 2007 Montréal World Film Festival, Fata Morgana was nominated for the Golden Zenith award. This accolade is part of the festival's recognition of outstanding films.

== Additional music credits ==
The additional music credits as they appear in the film are as follows: Sympathy, written by Mark Ashton, Graham Field, Stephen Gould, and Dave Kaffinetti, (of Rare Bird) was covered by Christina Agamanolis and Ryan Anton. The track features vocals, live drums, and hand drums performed by Ryan Anton, with sample programming, keys, and guitars by Christina Agamanolis. It was mastered by Fredrik Sarhagen. Le Christal Baschet was performed by Mariana Bernoski, with guitars, ebows, and bass by Christina Agamanolis. Fata Morgana was created by Mariana Bernoski, Christina Agamanolis, and Ryan Anton, with the backing track by Bernoski, guitar and vocals by Anton, and lead guitar, bass, and ebows by Agamanolis.
