= Alvin Lee and Company =

Compilation album by Ten Years After
- Released: 30 March 1972
- Recorded: 1967–1969
- Genre: Blues rock
- Length: 30:01 (original) 44:55 (reissue 1990)
- Label: Deram
- Producer: Mike Vernon

Ten Years After chronology
A Space in Time (1971)	Alvin Lee and Company (1972)	Rock & Roll Music to the World (1972)

Professional ratings
Review scores
Source	Rating
AllMusic	1.5/5 stars

Alvin Lee and Company is a Ten Years After compilation album of material previously unavailable on LP released by their old record label Deram after they had switched to Chrysalis Records in the UK and Columbia Records in the US. It consists of 2 non album singles, "Rock Your Mama" and "Portable People", the latter's b side "The Sounds", a live track, "Crossroads" and two outtakes, "Hold Me Tight" and "Boogie On".

== Track listing ==
All songs written by Alvin Lee, unless otherwise noted.

1. "The Sounds" – 4:13
2. "Rock Your Mama" – 2:55
3. "Hold Me Tight" – 2:15
4. "Standing at the Crossroads" (Elmore James, Robert Johnson) – 4:00
5. "Portable People" – 2:13
6. "Boogie On" – 14:25

=== CD reissue bonus tracks ===
1. "Spider in My Web" – 7:19
2. "Hear Me Calling" – 3:48 (Single version)
3. "I'm Going Home" – 3:37 (Single Version)
- NOTE: Some track times are incorrectly listed on the record sleeve: The Sounds (4:00), Rock Your Mama (3:00), Boogie On (14:35).

== Personnel ==
Ten Years After

- Alvin Lee – guitar, vocals
- Chick Churchill – organ
- Ric Lee – drums
- Leo Lyons – bass

== Charts ==
Chart (1972)	Peak position
Canada Top Albums/CDs (RPM)	60
Danish Albums (Hitlisten)	9
US Billboard 200	55
