= Now (Ten Years After album) =

Studio album by Ten Years After
- Released: July 13, 2004
- Recorded: 2004
- Genre: Blues rock
- Length: 45:06
- Label: Ten Years After
- Producer: Leo Lyons

Ten Years After chronology
One Night Jammed (2003)	Now (2004)	Roadworks Live (2005)

Professional ratings
Review scores
Source	Rating
AllMusic	3.5/5 stars

Now is the tenth studio album by blues rock band Ten Years After, released in 2004.

Longtime band member Alvin Lee had left the band to be replaced by singer/guitarist Joe Gooch alongside Chick Churchill (keyboards), Leo Lyons (bass), and Ric Lee (drums).

== Track listing ==
1. "When It All Falls Down" (Churchill, Gooch, Lee, Lyons) – 3:29
2. "Hundred Miles High" (Churchill, Gooch, Lee, Lyons) – 7:07
3. "Time to Kill" (Hans Koller, Lyons) – 4:33
4. "I'll Make It Easy for You" (Churchill, Gooch, Lee, Lyons) – 5:34
5. "The Voice Inside Your Head" (Churchill, Gooch, Lee, Lyons) – 4:34
6. "King of the Blues" (Tony Crooks, Lyons) – 3:36
7. "Long Time Running" (Gooch, Lyons, Mark Pullin) – 6:15
8. "Reasons Why" (Gooch, Lyons, Pullin) – 4:42
9. "Changes" (Churchill, Gooch, Lee, Lyons) – 5:14

== Personnel ==
Ten Years After

- Joe Gooch – guitar, vocals
- Leo Lyons – bass
- Ric Lee – drums
- Chick Churchill – organ
