= About Time (Ten Years After album) =

Studio album by Ten Years After
- Released: 28 August 1989
- Studio: Ardent
- Genre: Blues rock
- Length: 54:13
- Label: Chrysalis
- Producer: Terry Manning, Ten Years After

Ten Years After chronology
Universal (1987)	About Time (1989)	The Friday Rock Show Sessions - Live at Reading '83 (1990)

About Time is an album by the blues rock band Ten Years After, released in 1989. It was the final studio album featuring Alvin Lee, their singer and most prominent songwriter since the band's formation. It was their first studio release in fifteen years (since Positive Vibrations, in 1974).

About Time peaked at number 120 on the US Billboard 200.

== Production ==
Recorded at Ardent Studios in Memphis, the album was produced by Terry Manning.

== Critical reception ==
Professional ratings
Review scores
Source	Rating
AllMusic	3/5 stars
The Rolling Stone Album Guide	2.5/5 stars
Windsor Star	C

The Boston Globe noted that "pile-driving party rock is the order of the day, with guitarist Alvin Lee's fuzzed solos stealing the show as usual." The Windsor Star wrote that "the ham-handed rock-blues songs sound like outtakes from TYA's best years."

== Track listing ==
Side one
No.	Title	Writer(s)	Length
1.	"Highway of Love"	Steve Gould, Alvin Lee	5:13
2.	"Let's Shake It Up"	Gould, Lee	5:14
3.	"I Get All Shook Up"	Lee	4:38
4.	"Victim of Circumstance"	Lee	4:29
5.	"Going to Chicago"	Tim Hinkley, Lee	4:22
6.	"Wild Is the River"	Gould, Lee	3:53

Side two
No.	Title	Writer(s)	Length
1.	"Saturday Night"	Gould, Lee	4:06
2.	"Bad Blood"	Tony Crooks, Leo Lyons	7:09
3.	"Working in a Parking Lot"	Crooks, Lyons, Andy Nye	4:52
4.	"Outside My Window"	Gould, Lee	5:47
5.	"Waiting for the Judgement Day"	Gould, Lee	4:30
Total length:			54:13

Notes

- The track order is different for the CD release, which puts "Wild is the River" between "Working in a Parking Lot" and "Outside My Window".

== Personnel ==
Ten Years After

- Alvin Lee – guitar, vocals
- Leo Lyons – bass
- Ric Lee – drums
- Chick Churchill – keyboards

with:

- Nick Carls – backing vocals
- Jimi Jamison – backing vocals

Technical

- Terry Manning – engineer, producer

== Charts ==
Chart (1989)	Peak position
German Albums (Offizielle Top 100)	87
US Billboard 200	120
