= Positive Vibrations =

Studio album by Ten Years After
- Released: April 1974
- Genres: Blues rock, rock and roll
- Length: 40:28
- Labels: Chrysalis (UK); Columbia (USA)
- Producer: Ten Years After

Ten Years After chronology
Recorded Live (1973)	Positive Vibrations (1974)	About Time (1989)

Professional ratings
Review scores
Source	Rating
AllMusic	2/5 stars

Positive Vibrations is the eighth studio album by the English blues rock band Ten Years After, released in 1974. Shortly after the release of this album, the band broke up. The album peaked at No. 81 in the US Billboard 200 chart.

== Track listing ==
All songs written by Alvin Lee, except where noted.

=== Side one ===
1. "Nowhere to Run" – 4:02
2. "Positive Vibrations" – 4:20
3. "Stone Me" – 4:57
4. "Without You" – 4:00
5. "Going Back to Birmingham" (Little Richard) – 2:39

=== Side two ===
1. "It's Getting Harder" – 4:24
2. "You're Driving Me Crazy" – 2:26
3. "Look into My Life" – 4:18
4. "Look Me Straight into the Eyes" – 6:20
5. "I Wanted to Boogie" – 3:36

=== 2013 remaster additional tracks ===
11. "Rock & Roll Music to the World" (Live in Frankfurt)
12. "Once There Was a Time" (Live in Frankfurt)
13. "Spoonful" (Live in Paris)
14. "I'm Going Home" (Live in Paris)
15. "Standing at the Station" (Live in Amsterdam)
16. "Sweet Little Sixteen" (Live in Atlanta)
17. Positive Vibrations Radio Advert (1974)

== Personnel ==
Ten Years After

- Alvin Lee – guitars, vocals, harmonica (3)
- Leo Lyons – bass guitar
- Ric Lee – drums
- Chick Churchill – organ, synthesizer, piano

== Charts ==
Chart (1974)	Peak position
Australian Albums (Kent Music Report)	84
Canada Top Albums/CDs (RPM)	78
Danish Albums (Hitlisten)	15
Norwegian Albums (VG-lista)	18
US Billboard 200	81
