= A Space in Time =

Studio album by Ten Years After
- Released: August 1971
- Studios: Olympic, London
- Genre: Rock
- Length: 37:04
- Labels: Chrysalis; Columbia
- Producer: Ten Years After

Ten Years After chronology
| Watt (1970) | A Space in Time (1971) | Alvin Lee and Company (1972) |

Singles from A Space in Time
- 1. "I'd Love to Change the World" Released: September 1971; 2. "Baby Won't You Let Me Rock 'n' Roll You" Released: January 1972

A Space in Time is the sixth studio album by the British blues rock band Ten Years After. It was released in August 1971 by Chrysalis Records in the United Kingdom and Columbia Records in the United States. A departure in style from their previous albums, A Space in Time is less 'heavy' than previous albums and includes more acoustic guitar, perhaps influenced by the success of Led Zeppelin who were mixing acoustic songs with heavier numbers. It reached number 17 on the Billboard 200.

The third track on the album, "I'd Love to Change the World", is also their biggest hit. By combining a melodic acoustic chorus with challenging electric guitar riffs, they managed to produce a sound that hit number 10 in the charts in Canada and number 40 in the US. Although this was their biggest hit, they rarely played it live. "Baby Won't You Let Me Rock 'n' Roll You" also charted, peaking at number 61 in the US, and reaching number 54 in Canada.

== Critical reception ==
Professional ratings
Review scores
| Source | Rating |
|---|---|
| AllMusic | 4/5 stars |
| Christgau's Record Guide | B− |
| The Village Voice | B+ |

Billy Walker gave the album a generally positive review in Sounds. He noted the atypically soft sound of songs such as "Over the Hill" and "Let the Sky Fall" and approved of this "unexpected but pleasing dimension to the overall feel of the album", while simultaneously praising "the old TYA excitement" of tracks such as "I'd Love to Change the World" and "Baby Won't You Let Me Rock 'n' Roll You". He particularly praised Alvin Lee's guitar work. However, he complained that a number of the tracks suffered from "lack of strength or projection of Alvin's voice" and concluded "Ten Years After are a far better live band than their albums suggest; they get over much more of their charisma and excitement that has a job surfacing on their recorded work."

Village Voice critic Robert Christgau said the album is one "in which the rock heavy comes of age with his toughest, fullest, and most coherent album. I like it in a way, but it does lack a certain winning abandon, and I'm not crazy about the heavy's economic theories—fellow seems to believe that if you 'tax the rich to feed the poor' you soon run out of rich, with dire consequences."

== Track listing ==
All songs by Alvin Lee except "Uncle Jam", which was composed by C. Churchill, A. Lee, R. Lee and L. Lyons.

Side one

1. "One of These Days" – 5:52
2. "Here They Come" – 4:27
3. "I'd Love to Change the World" – 3:42
4. "Over the Hill" – 2:28
5. "Baby Won't You Let Me Rock 'n' Roll You" – 2:10

Side two

1. "Once There Was a Time" – 3:20
2. "Let the Sky Fall" – 4:19
3. "Hard Monkeys" – 3:12
4. "I've Been There Too" – 5:40
5. "Uncle Jam" – 1:54

== Personnel ==
Ten Years After

- Alvin Lee – guitar, vocals
- Leo Lyons – bass
- Ric Lee – drums
- Chick Churchill – keyboards

Technical

- Recorded at Olympic Studios, London
- Engineer – Chris Kimsey
- String arrangement on "Over the Hill" by Del Newman
- Front cover photograph – Ed Caraeff
- Back cover photograph – Alvin Lee
- Executive producer – Chris Wright

== Charts ==
| Chart (1971–72) | Peak position |
|---|---|
| Australian Albums (Kent Music Report) | 18 |
| Canada Top Albums/CDs (RPM) | 21 |
| Danish Albums (Hitlisten) | 8 |
| Finnish Albums (The Official Finnish Charts) | 11 |
| German Albums (Offizielle Top 100) | 35 |
| Norwegian Albums (VG-lista) | 13 |
| UK Albums (Official Charts) | 36 |
| US Billboard 200 | 17 |

| Chart (2023) | Peak position |
|---|---|
| Scottish Albums (Official Charts) | 24 |
| UK Independent Albums (Official Charts) | 9 |

== Certifications ==
| Region | Certification | Certified units/sales |
|---|---|---|
| Canada (Music Canada) | Gold | 50,000^{^} |
| United States (RIAA) | Platinum | 1,000,000^{^} |
^{^} Shipments figures based on certification alone.
