= Watt (album) =

Studio album by Ten Years After
- Released: December 1970
- Recorded: September 1970
- Studios: Olympic, London
- Genres: Blues rock, psychedelic rock
- Length: 37:52
- Labels: Deram; Chrysalis
- Producer: Ten Years After

Ten Years After chronology
Cricklewood Green (1970)	Watt (1970)	A Space in Time (1971)

Watt is the fifth studio album by the English blues rock band Ten Years After, released in 1970. It was recorded in September 1970 except for the last track, a cover of Chuck Berry's "Sweet Little Sixteen", which is a recording from the 1970 Isle of Wight Festival.

== Reception ==
Professional ratings
Review scores
Source	Rating
AllMusic	3/5 stars
Christgau's Record Guide	C+

AllMusic gave Watt a moderately negative review, saying it "had many of the same ingredients as its predecessor, Cricklewood Green, but wasn't nearly as well thought out." The site praised the band for performing as energetically as ever, but contended that Alvin Lee's compositions for the album are uniformly uninspired.

== Track listing ==
All songs written by Alvin Lee, unless otherwise noted.

=== Side One ===
1. "I'm Coming On" – 3:44
2. "My Baby Left Me" – 5:21
3. "Think About the Times" – 4:36
4. "I Say Yeah" – 5:14

=== Side Two ===
1. "The Band with No Name" – 1:34
2. "Gonna Run" – 5:57
3. "She Lies in the Morning" – 7:19
4. "Sweet Little Sixteen" (live) (Chuck Berry) – 4:07

== Personnel ==
Ten Years After

- Alvin Lee – guitar, vocals
- Leo Lyons – bass
- Ric Lee – drums
- Chick Churchill – organ

Technical

- Chris Kimsey – engineer

== Charts ==
Chart (1971)	Peak position
Australian Albums (Kent Music Report)	13
Canada Top Albums/CDs (RPM)	16
Danish Albums (Hitlisten)	7
Dutch Albums (Album Top 100)	2
Finnish Albums (The Official Finnish Charts)	7
German Albums (Offizielle Top 100)	9
Italian Albums (Musica e Dischi)	8
Norwegian Albums (VG-lista)	8
UK Albums (Official Charts)	5
US Billboard 200	21
