= Recorded Live =

Live album by Ten Years After
- Released: June 1973
- Recorded: 26–29 January 1973 live in Frankfurt, Rotterdam, Amsterdam and Paris
- Genre: Blues rock
- Length: 79:46
- Labels: Chrysalis; Columbia

Ten Years After chronology
Rock & Roll Music To The World (1972)	Recorded Live (1973)	Positive Vibrations (1974)

Professional ratings
Review scores
Source	Rating
Allmusic	3/5 stars

Recorded Live is the second live album by British blues rock musicians Ten Years After, which was released as a double LP in 1973.

This album, containing no overdubs or additives, was recorded over four nights in Amsterdam, Rotterdam, Frankfurt and Paris with the Rolling Stones' mobile recording truck and later mixed from sixteen tracks to stereo at Olympic Studios in London. An expanded edition was rereleased as a two compact disc set in 2013, with seven previously unreleased tracks.

== Track listing (original album) ==
All tracks composed by Alvin Lee; except where indicated

=== Side one ===
1. "One of These Days" – 5:36
2. "You Give Me Loving" – 5:25
3. "Good Morning Little Schoolgirl" (Sonny Boy Williamson I) – 7:15

=== Side two ===
1. "Hobbit" (excluded from some CDs) (Ric Lee) – 7:15
2. "Help Me" (Sonny Boy Williamson II, Willie Dixon, Ralph Bass) – 10:44

=== Side three ===
1. "Classical Thing" – 0:55
2. "Scat Thing" – 0:54
3. "I Can't Keep From Cryin' Sometimes (Part 1)" (Al Kooper) – 1:57
4. "Extension on One Chord" (Alvin Lee, Ric Lee, Chick Churchill, Leo Lyons) – 10:46
5. "I Can't Keep From Cryin' Sometimes (Part 2)" (Al Kooper) – 3:21

=== Side four ===
1. "Silly Thing" – 0:26
2. "Slow Blues in 'C'" – 7:24
3. "I'm Going Home" – 9:30
4. "Choo Choo Mama" – 2:56

== Track listing (CD reissue of original album) ==
=== CD 1 ===
1. "One of These Days" (A. Lee) – 5:36
2. "You Give Me Loving" (A. Lee) – 5:25
3. "Good Morning Little Schoolgirl" (Williamson) – 7:15
4. "Hobbit" (excluded from some CDs) (R. Lee) – 7:15
5. "Help Me" (Williamson, Bass) – 10:44

=== CD 2 ===
1. "Classical Thing" (A. Lee) – 0:55
2. "Scat Thing" (A. Lee) – 0:54
3. "I Can't Keep From Cryin' Sometimes (Part 1)" (A. Kooper) – 1:57
4. "Extension on One Chord" (A. Lee, R. Lee, Churchill, Lyons) – 10:46
5. "I Can't Keep From Cryin' Sometimes (Part 2)" (A. Kooper) – 3:21
6. "Silly Thing" (A. Lee) – 0:26
7. "Slow Blues in 'C'" (A. Lee) – 7:24
8. "I'm Going Home" (A. Lee) – 9:30
9. "Choo Choo Mama" (A. Lee) – 2:56

== Track listing (2013 CD reissue with bonus tracks) ==
=== CD 1 ===
Original album

1. "One of These Days" (A. Lee) – 6:20 (Frankfurt)
2. "You Give Me Loving" (A. Lee) – 6:10 (Frankfurt)
3. "Good Morning Little Schoolgirl" (Williamson) – 7:27 (Frankfurt)
4. "Hobbit" (R. Lee) – 8:36 (Frankfurt)
5. "Help Me" (Williamson, Bass) – 10:49 (Amsterdam)

Bonus tracks

6. "Time Is Flying" (A. Lee) – 5:36 (Frankfurt)
7. "Standing at the Station (A. Lee) – 11:51 (Frankfurt)
8. "Jam" (A. Lee, R. Lee, C. Churchill, L. Lyons) – 18:09 (Amsterdam)

=== CD 2 ===
Bonus tracks

1. "Help Me" (Williamson, Dixon, Bass) – 12:06 (Paris)
2. "I Woke Up This Morning" (A. Lee) – 4:26 (Rotterdam)
3. "Sweet Little Sixteen" (Chuck Berry) – 4:24 (Frankfurt)
4. "Jam" (A. Lee, R. Lee, C. Churchill, L. Lyons) – 16:33 (Frankfurt)

Original album

5. "Classical Thing" (A. Lee) – 0:53 (Paris)
6. "Scat Thing" (A. Lee) – 0:57 (Paris)
7. "I Can't Keep From Cryin' Sometimes (Part 1)" (A. Kooper) – 1:57 (Paris)
8. "Extension on One Chord" (A. Lee, R. Lee, Churchill, Lyons) – 10:45 (Paris)
9. "I Can't Keep From Cryin' Sometimes (Part 2)" (A. Kooper) – 3:12 (Paris)
10. "Silly Thing" (A. Lee) – 1:09 (Frankfurt)
11. "Slow Blues in 'C'" (A. Lee) – 8:14 (Frankfurt)
12. "I'm Going Home" (A. Lee) – 10:54 (Frankfurt)
13. "Choo Choo Mama" (A. Lee) – 3:21 (Frankfurt)

== Personnel ==
Ten Years After

- Alvin Lee – guitar, vocals
- Leo Lyons – bass
- Chick Churchill – organ, piano
- Ric Lee – drums

Additional personnel

- Recording Engineer – Chris Kimsey
- Photography by Brian Cooke
- Cover by Visualeyes
- Cover Conception – Walter Wanger
- Executive Coordination – Chris Wright
- Produced by Ten Years After

== Charts ==
Chart (1973)	Peak position
Australian Albums (Kent Music Report)	42
Austrian Albums (Ö3 Austria)	7
Canada Top Albums/CDs (RPM)	28
Danish Albums (Hitlisten)	23
Finnish Albums (The Official Finnish Charts)	28
German Albums (Offizielle Top 100)	10
Italian Albums (Musica e Dischi)	25
Norwegian Albums (VG-lista)	9
UK Albums (Official Charts)	36
US Billboard 200	39

== Certifications ==
Region	Certification	Certified units/sales
Australia (ARIA)	Gold	20,000^{^}
^{^} Shipments figures based on certification alone.
