= Cricklewood Green =

Studio album by Ten Years After
- Released: 17 April 1970
- Recorded: 1969
- Studios: Olympic, London
- Genres: Blues rock, psychedelic rock
- Length: 38:26
- Label: Deram
- Producer: Ten Years After

Ten Years After chronology
Ssssh (1969)	Cricklewood Green (1970)	Watt (1970)

Cricklewood Green is the fourth studio album by the English blues rock band Ten Years After, released in 1970 by Deram Records.

== Reception ==
Professional ratings
Review scores
Source	Rating
AllMusic	4.5/5 stars
Christgau's Record Guide	B−

In a retrospective review, Jim Newsom of AllMusic opined that "the band and engineer Andy Johns mix studio tricks and sound effects, blues-based song structures, a driving rhythm section, and Alvin Lee's signature lightning-fast guitar licks into a unified album that flows nicely from start to finish."

== Track listing ==
All songs written by Alvin Lee.

Side one
No.	Title	Length
1.	"Sugar the Road"	3:59
2.	"Working on the Road"	4:15
3.	"50,000 Miles Beneath My Brain"	7:37
4.	"Year 3,000 Blues"	2:17

Side two
No.	Title	Length
1.	"Me and My Baby"	4:12
2.	"Love Like a Man"	7:29
3.	"Circles"	3:55
4.	"As the Sun Still Burns Away"	4:42

== Personnel ==
Ten Years After

- Alvin Lee – guitar, vocals
- Leo Lyons – bass
- Ric Lee – drums
- Chick Churchill – organ, piano and harpsichord

== Charts ==
Chart (1970)	Peak position
Australian Albums (Kent Music Report)	19
Canada Top Albums/CDs (RPM)	11
Danish Albums (Hitlisten)	5
Finnish Albums (The Official Finnish Charts)	8
German Albums (Offizielle Top 100)	8
Italian Albums (Musica e Dischi)	17
Norwegian Albums (VG-lista)	8
UK Albums (Official Charts)	4
US Billboard 200	14

Chart (2026)	Peak position
US Top Blues Albums (Billboard)	12
