= Rock & Roll Music to the World =

Studio album by Ten Years After
- Released: September 1972
- Studios: Olympic, London; except No. 1, No. 5 with the Rolling Stones Mobile at Cap Ferrat, South France
- Genres: Blues rock, rock and roll
- Length: 45:10
- Labels: Chrysalis; Columbia
- Producer: Ten Years After

Ten Years After chronology
Alvin Lee and Company (1972)	Rock & Roll Music to the World (1972)	Recorded Live (1973)

Professional ratings
Review scores
Source	Rating
AllMusic	2.5/5 stars
Christgau's Record Guide	B
Creem	B

Rock & Roll Music to the World is the seventh studio album by the English blues rock band Ten Years After, released in 1972. It includes several Ten Years After standards, including "Standing at the Station", "Choo Choo Mama", and the title track.

== Track listing ==
All songs written by Alvin Lee.

1. "You Give Me Loving" – 6:33
2. "Convention Prevention" – 4:23
3. "Turned-Off TV Blues" – 5:13
4. "Standing at the Station" – 7:11
5. "You Can't Win Them All" – 4:06
6. "Religion" – 5:49
7. "Choo Choo Mama" – 4:02
8. "Tomorrow I'll Be Out of Town" – 4:29
9. "Rock & Roll Music to the World" – 3:47

== Personnel ==
Ten Years After

- Alvin Lee – guitar, vocals
- Leo Lyons – bass
- Ric Lee – drums
- Chick Churchill – organ, piano, synthesizer

Technical

- Chris Kimsey – engineer

== Charts ==
Chart (1972)	Peak position
Canada Top Albums/CDs (RPM)	19
Danish Albums (Hitlisten)	2
Finnish Albums (The Official Finnish Charts)	22
German Albums (Offizielle Top 100)	30
Norwegian Albums (VG-lista)	15
UK Albums (Official Charts)	27
US Billboard 200	43
