= Ten Years After (Ten Years After album) =

Studio album by Ten Years After
- Released: 27 October 1967
- Recorded: September 1967
- Studios: Decca, London
- Genre: Blues rock
- Length: 36:00
- Label: Deram
- Producers: Mike Vernon, Gus Dudgeon

Ten Years After chronology
| Ten Years After (1967) | Undead (1968) |

Professional ratings
Review scores
| Source | Rating |
|---|---|
| AllMusic | 3/5 stars |

Ten Years After is the debut album by English blues rock band Ten Years After. Recorded at Decca Studios in London in September 1967, and released on 27 October 1967.

This album has less original material than the band's later works, most of which were composed entirely of Alvin Lee's songs. It features "Spoonful", a song written by Willie Dixon and recorded by Howlin' Wolf, which the British blues rock group Cream had covered the previous year on their debut album Fresh Cream, with an extended live version on their third album, Wheels of Fire (1968).

The band's cover of "I Can't Keep from Crying Sometimes" is based on Al Kooper's arrangement from the 1966 compilation What's Shakin'.

== Track listing ==
Side one

1. "I Want to Know" (Sheila MacLeod) – 2:08
2. "I Can't Keep from Crying Sometimes" (Al Kooper) – 5:21
3. "Adventures of a Young Organ" [Instrumental] (Alvin Lee, Chick Churchill) – 2:32
4. "Spoonful" (Willie Dixon) – 6:00
5. "Losing the Dogs" (Alvin Lee, Gus Dudgeon) – 2:58

Side two

1. "Feel It for Me" (Alvin Lee) – 2:37
2. "Love Until I Die" (Alvin Lee) – 2:04
3. "Don't Want You Woman" (Alvin Lee) – 2:34
4. "Help Me" (Ralph Bass, Willie Dixon, Sonny Boy Williamson) – 9:46

=== 2002 bonus tracks ===
Remastered CD, Deram 8828972

- "Portable People" [Mono Single Version] (Alvin Lee) – 2:17
- "The Sounds" [Mono Single Version] (Alvin Lee) – 4:29
- "Rock Your Mama" (Alvin Lee) – 3:01
- "Spider in My Web" (Alvin Lee) – 7:11
- "Hold Me Tight" (Alvin Lee) – 2:18
- "(At the) Woodchopper's Ball" [Instrumental] (Joe Bishop, Woody Herman) – 7:46

== Personnel ==
Ten Years After

- Alvin Lee – guitars, acoustic guitar on "Don't Want You Woman" and "Portable People", vocals on all tracks except "Adventures of a Young Organ" and "Woodchipper's Ball", harmonica on "Love Until I Die"
- Leo Lyons – bass
- Ric Lee – drums
- Chick Churchill – organ, piano
