= I Hear You Rockin' =

I Hear You Rockin is the title of (at least) two albums.

- The Dave Edmunds Band: I Hear You Rockin'
- Alvin Lee: Nineteen Ninety-Four released in the United States as I Hear You Rockin'
