= RX5 =

RX5 may refer to:

- Roewe RX5, a Chinese compact crossover automobile
- RX5 (album), a 1981 album by The Alvin Lee Band
