= The Chrysalis Years: 1973–1979 =

Compilation album by UFO
- Released: 11 July 2011
- Recorded: Various locations, 1973–1979
- Genre: Hard rock, heavy metal
- Length: 5:55:31
- Label: Chrysalis
- Producer: Ron Nevison, Leo Lyons

UFO chronology
| All the Hits & More - The Early Days (2011) | The Chrysalis Years: 1973–1979 (2011) |

Professional ratings
Review scores
| Source | Rating |
|---|---|
| Allmusic | 4/5 stars |

The Chrysalis Years: 1973–1979 is a compilation album by the band UFO which includes 81 tracks, some not previously released. The compilation includes, in their entirety, the albums recorded for the Chrysalis label during said years, including (in order of appearance): Phenomenon (1974), Force It (1975), No Heavy Petting (1976), Lights Out (1977), Obsession (1978), and Strangers in the Night (1979). In addition to these albums, the compilation also includes a previously unreleased live set recorded at Alex Cooley's Electric Ballroom in Atlanta, GA, several singles and B-sides which had not previously been released in CD format, and tracks recorded with BBC DJs Bob Harris and John Peel but not included on the original album releases. Arguably, this period during the 1970s is the zenith of the band's creativity, and The Chrysalis Years: 1973–1979 is an attractive collection likely to contain all the recordings by the band one might desire excepting for the most devout UFO fans.

== Track listing ==
=== Disc 1 ===
1973 Single

1. "Give Her the Gun" [single] (Michael Schenker, Phil Mogg) – 3:59
2. "Sweet Little Thing" [B-side single] (Pete Way, Mogg) – 3:50

Phenomenon (1974)
(track 11 previously unreleased on CD)

1. "Oh My" (Schenker, Mogg, Way, Andy Parker) – 2:25
2. "Crystal Light" (Schenker, Mogg) – 3:47
3. "Doctor Doctor" (Schenker, Mogg) – 4:12
4. "Space Child" (Schenker, Mogg) – 4:01
5. "Rock Bottom" (Schenker, Mogg) – 6:29
6. "Too Young to Know" (Way, Mogg) – 3:09
7. "Time on My Hands" (Schenker, Mogg) – 4:12
8. "Built for Comfort" (Dixon) – 3:08
9. "Lipstick Traces" (Schenker) – 2:21
10. "Queen of the Deep" (Schenker, Mogg) – 5:44
11. "Doctor Doctor" [bonus track / single] (Schenker, Mogg) – 2:51

Bob Harris recording session, 28 October 1974

1. "Rock Bottom" (Schenker, Mogg) – 7:08
2. "Time on My Hands" (Schenker, Mogg) – 3:14
3. "Give Her the Gun" (Schenker, Mogg) – 4:10

=== Disc 2 ===
Live at the Electric Ballroom, Atlanta, GA (5 November 1974)
(tracks 1–8 previously unreleased)

1. "Oh My" (Schenker, Mogg, Way, Parker) – 3:39
2. "Doctor Doctor" (Schenker, Mogg) – 4:05
3. "Built for Comfort" (Dixon) – 4:23
4. "Give Her the Gun" (Schenker, Mogg) – 5:17
5. "Cold Turkey" (Lennon) – 8:36
6. "Space Child" (Schenker, Mogg) – 4:32
7. "Rock Bottom" (Schenker, Mogg) – 8:13
8. "Prince Kajuku" (Mogg, Way, Parker, Mick Bolton, Wallis) – 7:19

Force It (1975)

1. "Let It Roll" (Schenker, Mogg) – 3:56
2. "Shoot Shoot" (Schenker, Mogg, Way, Parker) – 3:40
3. "High Flyer" (Schenker, Mogg) – 4:08
4. "Love Lost Love" (Schenker, Mogg) – 3:21
5. "Out in the Street" (Mogg, Way) – 5:14

=== Disc 3 ===
Force It (1975) (continued)

1. "Mother Mary" (Schenker, Mogg, Way, Parker) – 3:50
2. "Too Much of Nothing" (Way) – 4:02
3. "Dance Your Life Away" (Schenker, Mogg) – 3:35
4. "This Kid's" [including Between the Walls] (Schenker, Mogg) – 6:15

No Heavy Petting (1976)

1. "Natural Thing" (Schenker, Mogg, Way) – 4:00
2. "I'm a Loser" (Schenker, Mogg) – 3:55
3. "Can You Roll Her" (Mogg, Parker, Peyronel) – 2:59
4. "Belladonna" (Schenker, Mogg) – 4:32
5. "Reasons Love" (Schenker, Mogg) – 3:17
6. "Highway Lady" (Peyronel) – 3:49
7. "On with the Action" (Schenker, Mogg, Peyronel) – 5:03
8. "A Fool in Love" (Miller, Fraser) – 2:50
9. "Martian Landscape" (Schenker, Mogg, Peyronel) – 5:08

Lights Out (1977)

1. "Too Hot to Handle" (Mogg, Way) – 3:37
2. "Just Another Suicide" (Mogg) – 4:58
3. "Try Me" (Schenker, Mogg) – 4:49
4. "Lights Out" (Schenker, Mogg, Way, Parker) – 4:30

=== Disc 4 ===
Lights Out (1977) (continued)
(track 5 previously unreleased on CD)

1. "Gettin' Ready" (Schenker, Mogg) – 3:47
2. "Alone Again Or" (MacLean) – 3:00
3. "Electric Phase" (Schenker, Mogg) – 4:17
4. "Love to Love" (Schenker, Mogg, Way, Parker) – 7:40
5. "Try Me [bonus track / single remix]" (Schenker, Mogg, Way, Parker) – 3:29

John Peel recording session, 27 June 1977

1. "Too Hot to Handle" (Mogg, Way) – 3:50
2. "Lights Out" (Schenker, Mogg, Way, Parker) – 4:57
3. "Try Me" (Schenker, Mogg) – 4:46

Obsession (1978)
(track 12 previously unreleased on CD)

1. "Only You Can Rock Me" (Mogg, Way) – 4:07
2. "Pack It Up (And Go)" (Schenker, Mogg, Way) – 3:14
3. "Arbory Hill" (Schenker) – 1:11
4. "Ain't No Baby" (Mogg, Way) – 3:57
5. "Lookin' Out for No. 1" (Mogg, Way) – 4:34
6. "Hot 'n' Ready" (Schenker, Mogg) – 3:15
7. "Cherry" (Mogg, Way) – 3:34
8. "You Don't Fool Me" (Schenker, Mogg) – 3:23
9. "Lookin' Out for No. 1 [reprise]" (Mogg, Way) – 1:14
10. "One More for the Rodeo" (Mogg, Way) – 3:45
11. "Born to Lose" (Schenker, Mogg, Way) – 3:35
12. "Only You Can Rock Me [bonus track / single]" (Mogg, Way) – 3:30

=== Disc 5 ===
Strangers in the Night (1979)
(track 15 previously unreleased on CD)

1. "Natural Thing" (Schenker, Mogg, Way) – 3:53
2. "Out in the Street" (Mogg, Way) – 5:15
3. "Only You Can Rock Me" (Mogg, Way) – 4:09
4. "Doctor Doctor" (Schenker, Mogg) – 4:42
5. "Mother Mary" (Schenker, Mogg, Way, Parker) – 3:25
6. "This Kid's" (Schenker, Mogg) – 5:21
7. "Love to Love" (Schenker, Mogg, Way, Parker) – 7:48
8. "Lights Out" (Schenker, Mogg, Way, Parker) – 5:22
9. "Rock Bottom" (Schenker, Mogg) – 11:15
10. "Too Hot to Handle" (Mogg, Way) – 4:28
11. "I'm a Loser" (Schenker, Mogg) – 4:14
12. "Let It Roll" (Schenker, Mogg) – 4:48
13. "Shoot Shoot" (Schenker, Mogg, Way, Parker) – 4:11
14. "Doctor Doctor [bonus track / Live single]" (Schenker, Mogg) – 3:43
15. "On with the Action [bonus track / Live B-side single]" (Schenker, Mogg, Peyronel) – 4:57

== Personnel ==
- Phil Mogg – vocals
- Michael Schenker – lead guitar
- Pete Way – bass
- Andy Parker – drums
- Paul Raymond – rhythm guitar, keyboards (disc 3, tracks 14–17; disc 4 & disc 5)
- Danny Peyronel—keyboards and vocals (disc 3, tracks 5–13)
- Ron Nevison – producer
- Leo Lyons – producer

== Charts ==
| Chart (2011) | Peak position |
|---|---|
| UK Rock & Metal Albums (OCC) | 14 |
