= Jetta (musician) =

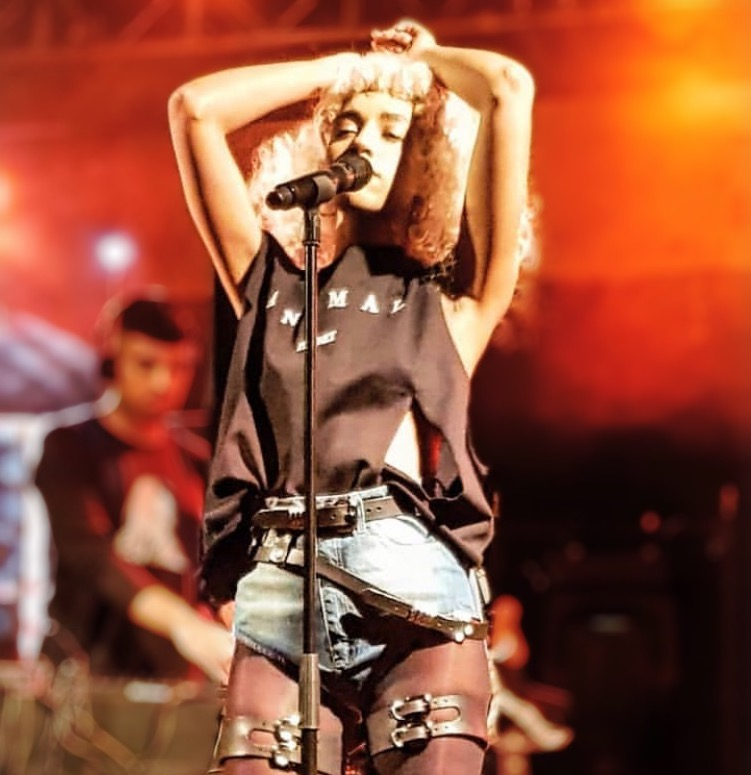
- Jetta performing live

Background information
- Born: Jetta John-Hartley
- Origin: Liverpool, England
- Genres: Indie pop; alt-pop; electronic; pop rock
- Occupations: Singer; songwriter; producer
- Years active: 2014–present
- Label: 3Beat

Jetta (full name Jetta John-Hartley) is a singer-songwriter and record producer from Liverpool who is based in London.

== Early life ==
When she was 15 years old, Jetta was gifted the music editing software Logic on which she taught herself to produce music.

== Career ==
In 2014, Jetta released a self-shot music video for her song "Start a Riot" which gained thousands of views in its first week on YouTube and brought her significant attention. The same year, her cover of Ten Years After's song "I'd Love to Change the World" was used in a trailer for Dawn of the Planet of the Apes, the first trailer for the movies Nightcrawler and Terminator Genisys, and in the first episode of the fourth season of CBS' TV series Person of Interest.

In 2015, after pairing up with electronic producer Matstubs on a remix of Jetta's cover, the song received further significant attention after being posted to the Trap Nation YouTube channel. It then hit gold, generating over 200 million plays on YouTube, and 120 million on Spotify, becoming her most listened to song. In 2017, L'Orchestra Cinématique released the remix cover of the song on the trailer for Star Trek: Discovery.

Jetta has written songs for rapper Machine Gun Kelly ("Merry Go Round"), girl group Neon Jungle ("Louder", "Fool Me"), DJ Sam Feldt ("Runaways"), and singers P!nk ("More"), Medina ("Runnin Out of Love", "We Survive") and Ashley Roberts ("Clockwork").

Between 2019 and 2020, Jetta released four standalone singles, "No Fire", "Livin'", "I Wanna Know" and "Taste". Jetta released her next single "He Usually Likes Boys" on 22 July 2021, followed by "Honey", on 3 December the same year.

On 12 August 2022, she released the extended play Livin' which was composed of her four previously released singles (including "Livin'") and two stripped versions of "Livin'" and "No Fire".

In 2023, Jetta released a series of back to back, along with self-shot music videos for each single.

On 26 January 2024, Jetta released her debut album Relax, The House Is On Fire.

== Discography ==
=== Studio albums ===
List of albums with selected details
Title	Album details
Relax, the House Is on Fire	Released: 26 January 2024; Label: 3Beat, Universal Music Group, Casablanca Records; Status: Full-length; Format: Streaming

=== Extended plays ===
List of extended plays with selected details
Title	Extended play details
Start a Riot	Released: 4 February 2014; Label: Lava, Republic Records; Status: Promotional; Format: CD
Feels Like Coming Home	Released: 19 April 2014; Label: Lava, Republic Records; Status: Promotional; Format: CD
Crescendo	Released: 16 May 2014; Label: Polydor; Status: Promotional; Format: CD
Start a Riot (re-release)	Released: 11 May 2018; Label: Lion's Roar Records; Format: Digital download, streaming
Tonic	Released: 24 August 2018; Label: Lion's Roar Records; Format: Digital download, streaming
Livin'	Released: 12 August 2022; Label: 3Beat; Format: Digital download, streaming

=== Singles ===
Title	Year	Certifications	Album
"Feels Like Coming Home"	2013		Start a Riot / Feels Like Coming Home
"Start a Riot"	2014		Start a Riot
"Crescendo"	2014		Crescendo
"I'd Love to Change the World"	2014	RIAA: Gold	Non-album singles
"Take It Easy" (Matstubs Remix)	2016		Non-album singles
"Zoo"	2018		Non-album singles
"Hangin'"	2018		Tonic
"Losing Control"	2018		Tonic
"Fool"	2018		Tonic
"Enemy in Me"	2018		Tonic
"No Fire"	2019		Livin'
"Livin'"	2020		Livin'
"I Wanna Know"	2020		Livin'
"Taste"	2020		Non-album single
"He Usually Likes Boys"	2021		Livin'
"Honey"	2021		Non-album single
"sticky icky"	2023		Relax, the House Is on Fire
"sicklysweet"	2023		Relax, the House Is on Fire
"teardrops on the radio"	2023		Relax, the House Is on Fire
"teardrops (chopped n screwed)"	2023		Relax, the House Is on Fire
"what happens now?"	2023		Relax, the House Is on Fire
"sicklysweet (Tobiahs remix)"	2024		Non-album single

=== Featured singles ===
Title	Year	Album
"Electrify" (Jakwob featuring Jetta)	2012	Non-album single

=== Other appearances ===
Title	Year	Album
"You Win"	2013	Kokowääh 2 (Original Soundtrack)
"Slow Down" (Sigma featuring Jetta)	2015	Life (Deluxe)
"Slow Down" (Calyx and Teebee Remix) (Sigma featuring Jetta, Calyx and Teebee)	2017	Life (Remixes)
"Can't Catch Me 2.0" (NoMBe featuring Mikky Ekko and Jetta)	2019	They Might've Even Loved Me (Re:Imagination)
"More (Demo)" (Busbee featuring Jetta)	2023	Non-album single
