= Marie Zielcke =

German actress

- Born: 3 February 1979 (age 47); Cologne, West Germany (now Germany)
- Occupation: Actress
- Agent: Fitz+Skoglund Agents
- Height: 165 cm (5 ft 5 in)
- Spouse: Henry Thomas (m. 2004; div. 2007)
- Children: 1

Marie Zielcke (born 3 February 1979 in Cologne) is a German film, television and stage actress.

== Career ==
Mika Kaurismäki, who directed Zielcke in the 2000 film Highway Society, introduced her to actor Henry Thomas in Berlin. Zielcke and Thomas had a daughter together in 2004, marrying that same year. By 2006, Zielcke had started a long-term relationship with actor Christoph Maria Herbst, and Thomas filed for divorce in 2007. Zielcke and Herbst remained together until 2009.

== Selected filmography ==
Year	Title	Role
1997	Silvester Countdown	Julia
1998	Am I Beautiful?	Angelina
1999	The Cry of the Butterfly	Paulina
2000	No Place to Go	Nurse
2000	Highway Society	Elisabeth Dirberg
2001	Lammbock	Laura Becker
2003	Zuckerbrot	Jenny
2004	Agnes and His Brothers	Nadine
2007	Fata Morgana	Laura
2007	Alibi	Jenna Bryant
2012	Out of Sight	Ester
