= Nineteen Ninety-Four (album) =

Studio album by Alvin Lee
- Released: 22 November 1993
- Genre: Rock 'n' Roll
- Label: Repertoire

Alvin Lee chronology
Zoom (1992)	Nineteen Ninety-Four (1993)	In Tennessee (2004)

Nineteen Ninety-Four (Viceroy VIC 8012-2, Reissue: Repertoire REP5191) is a 1994 album by Alvin Lee released in the United States as Keep On Rockin'.

== Track listing ==
All tracks composed by Alvin Lee; except where noted.

1. "Keep On Rockin'" - 5:09
2. "Long Legs" - 6:16
3. "I Hear You Knockin'" (Dave Bartholomew, Pearl King) - 3:40
4. "Ain't Nobody's Business" (Alvin Lee, Steve Grant) - 4:11
5. "The Bluest Blues" - 7:27
6. "Boogie All Day" - 3:52
7. "My Baby's Come Back to Me" - 4:58
8. "Take It Easy" - 6:24
9. "Play It Like It Used to Be" (Alvin Lee, Tim Hinkley) - 4:01
10. "Give Me Your Love" (Alvin Lee, Steve Gould) - 5:58
11. "I Don't Give a Damn" - 5:46
12. "I Want You (She's So Heavy)" (Lennon–McCartney) - 9:52

== Personnel ==
- Alvin Lee - guitar, vocals
- Steve Gould - bass
- Alan Young - drums
- Steve Grant - keyboards

Special Guests

- George Harrison - slide guitar on "The Bluest Blues" and "I Want You (She's So Heavy)"
- Joe Brown - vocals and plectrum banjo on "I Hear You Knockin'" and "Boogie All Day"
- Sam Brown and Deena Payne - vocals on "Long Legs" and "Give Me Your Love"
- Tim Hinkley - Hammond organ on "The Bluest Blues" and "I Don't Give a Damn"; piano on "Play It Like It Used to Be"
