= Mark Ashton (musician) =

English singer

Mark Ashton is a British musician, best known as the drummer of the band Rare Bird, known for their single "Sympathy".

== Musical career ==
Ashton started his musical career playing drums for progressive rock band Rare Bird, formed in 1969 by organist Graham Field. Their first single Sympathy, written by Field, reached #27 in the UK and sold three million copies around the world. Ashton left Rare Bird along with Graham Field in 1971, and later formed the band Headstone. After his new band failed to achieve success, Ashton started a solo career releasing three albums.

== Discography ==
=== Solo albums ===
- 1978 Mark Ashton (20th Century)
- 1979 Solo (Arista)
- 1988 Modern Pilgrims (RCA)
