= Free Fall (Alvin Lee Band album) =

Studio album by the Alvin Lee Band
- Released: 1980
- Studios: Space, Reading, Berkshire
- Genre: Rock
- Labels: Avatar (UK); Atlantic (USA); Repertoire (2005 German CD reissue)
- Producer: John Stronach

The Alvin Lee Band chronology
Ride On (1979)	Free Fall (1980)	RX5 (1981)

Professional ratings
Review scores
Source	Rating
AllMusic	2.5/5 stars
The Rolling Stone Album Guide	2/5 stars

Free Fall is a studio album by the rock band the Alvin Lee Band, released in 1980. "Take the Money" appears on the 1979 Gerry Rafferty release Night Owl as "Take the Money and Run".

== Track listing ==
All tracks composed by Alvin Lee and Steve Gould; except where noted

1. "I Don't Wanna Stop" – 4:11
2. "Take the Money" (Gerry Rafferty) – 4:28
3. "One Lonely Hour" – 4:28
4. "Heartache" – 3:15
5. "Stealin'" (Steve Gould) – 3:28
6. "Ridin' Truckin'" (Alvin Lee) – 3:34
7. "No More Lonely Nights" – 4:27
8. "City Lights" (Alvin Lee) – 4:05
9. "Sooner Or Later" (Rene Arnell) – 3:32
10. "Dustbin City" (Keith Christmas) – 2:38

== Personnel ==
The Alvin Lee Band

- Alvin Lee - guitar, vocals
- Steve Gould - guitar, vocals
- Mick Feat - bass guitar, vocals
- Tom Compton - drums, percussion

with:

- Derek Austin - synthesizer on "I Don't Wanna Stop" and "Sooner or Later", piano on "Ridin' Truckin'"
- Raphael Ravenscroft - saxophone on "Heartache" and "Ridin' Truckin'"
- Pete Thoms - trombone on "Heartache" and "Ridin' Truckin'"
- Al Kooper - organ on "Sooner or Later"

Technical

- Robert Patterson - executive producer
- Andy Jaworski, John Stronach - engineer
