= Marcus Bonfanti =

British blues musician (born 1983)

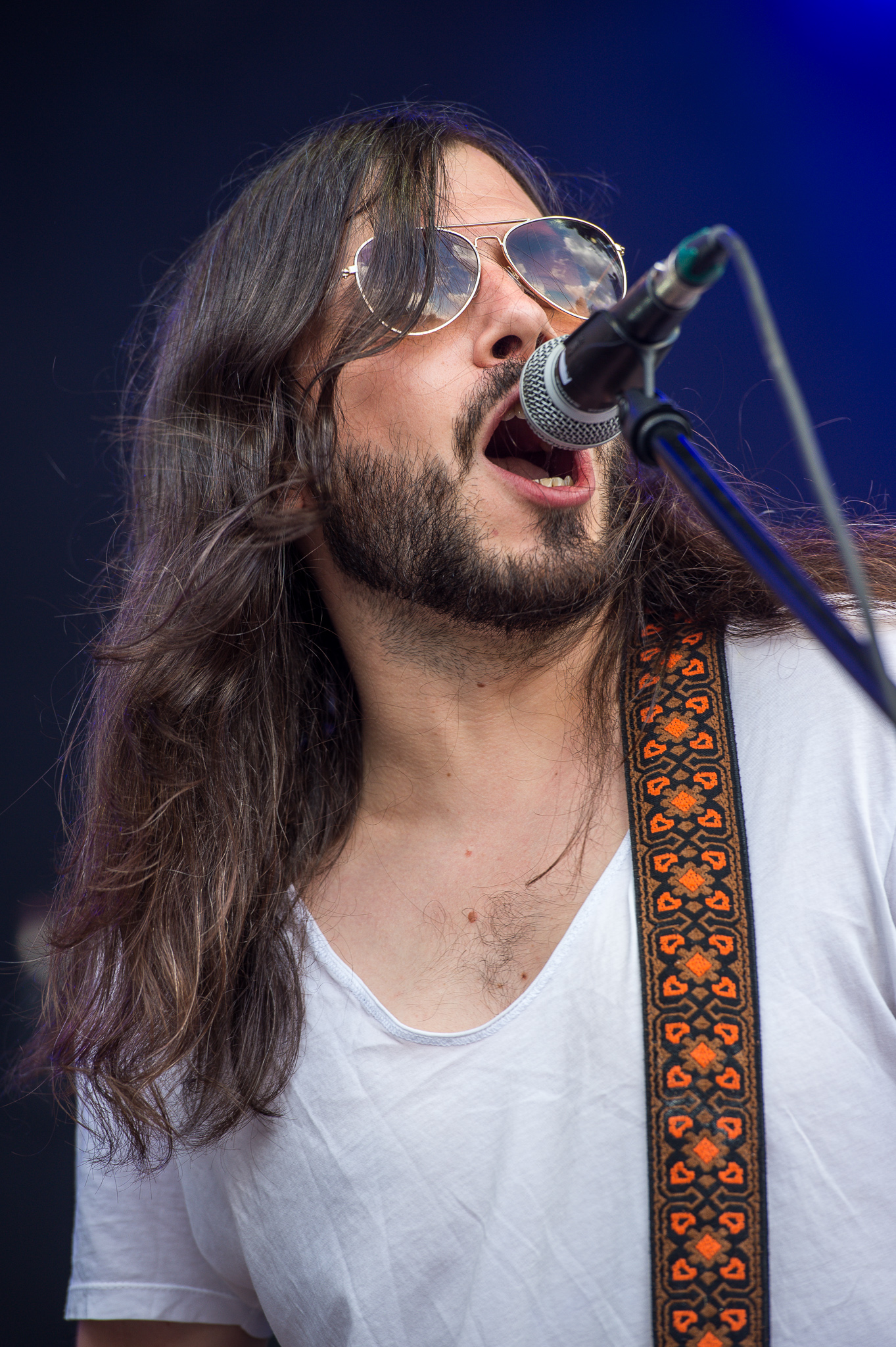
- Portrait of Marcus Bonfanti

Background information
- Born: 5 May 1983 (age 43); London, England
- Genres: Blues, blues rock
- Occupations: Singer, songwriter, guitarist
- Instruments: Vocals, guitar
- Years active: 2004–present
- Label: Various
- Website: Official website

Marcus Bonfanti (born 5 May 1983) is a British blues singer, songwriter and guitarist. He has released three albums and one EP, and works both as a solo musician and, from 2014 until 2024, as the frontman for the British blues rock group Ten Years After. His most recent solo album was Shake the Walls (2013) released by Jig-Saw Music Ltd.

Bonfanti has opened shows for Robert Cray, Chuck Berry, Shuggie Otis, Philip Sayce, Jack Bruce, Beth Hart, John Mayall, Beth Rowley and JJ Grey & Mofro. He once fronted The Ronnie Scott's Blues Explosion and, at times, has worked with P. P. Arnold, Ginger Baker, Earl Thomas, Joe Louis Walker, Robbie McIntosh, Hamish Stuart, Mark Feltham, Eric Burdon and Buddy Whittington.

== Life and career ==
Bonfanti was born in London to an Italian father and an English mother. In his youth, Bonfanti played the trumpet in several brass bands. His musical tastes changed when he heard Led Zeppelin's "Black Dog" from their album, Led Zeppelin IV. His mother produced an old guitar from the family's loft and Bonfanti tried to master the instrument, encouraged by his parents who were both keen on music. His younger brother is also a musician and works as a professional bass guitarist. Bonfanti worked in a kitchen to earn sufficient monies to purchase his first guitar at the age of 15. By 2015, he owned around 16 guitars. In his teenage years, Bonfanti had to swap between acoustic and electric guitars, depending on whether his parents were in the house. One of the first albums he bought was Joe Cocker's With a Little Help from My Friends. His interest in Led Zeppelin led Bonfanti backwards chronologically to the work of Willie Dixon and Blind Willie Johnson.

In 2001, Bonfanti first attended the Liverpool Institute for Performing Arts, and found the musical environment useful in honing his skills, but ultimately the conflict between college and him later working as a professional musician, led to Bonfanti leaving the course. He worked as a session musician and played solo, and, in 2007, he relocated back to London, having saved money from his playing. In due course Bonfanti became a songwriter, guitarist and singer, and recorded his debut album, Hard Times in 2008. What Good Am I to You? followed in 2010, which heighten his presence and audience base, exemplified in 2012 when Bonfanti won the British Blues Awards for Best Songwriter. Bonfanti acknowledged that the second album bore some elements of an American influence, in part because some of the material therein was written in the US. What Good Am I to You? was listed as one of the Top 50 albums of 2010 in Classic Rock. In 2011, Bonfanti played guitar on Rebecca Ferguson's album, Heaven.

The period following the release of his second album was marked by a series of setbacks. He was dropped by P3 Music, which had released his first two albums, and was subsequently dropped by another label while attempting to record a new collection.

Eventually, Jig-Saw Music Ltd offered him the opportunity to record at the Grange Studios in Norfolk. Bonfanti originally recorded all his work for his new album on an acoustic guitar. He also recorded what was to become, Shake the Walls, on analogue tape rather than the modern-day digital process. Shake The Walls was released in June 2013, and again listed by Classic Rock in the Top 5 Blues Albums of the year. In addition the album got airplay on BBC Radio 2 and BBC Radio 6 Music. Bonfanti won the 2013 and 2014 British Blues Awards for Best Acoustic Performer. In 2013, Bonfanti supplied guitar work to the Johnny Hates Jazz album, Magnetized.

In 2014, Bonfanti was invited to front Ten Years After, which he continued to do for a decade, alongside his own solo career. In September 2024, it was announced that the Ten Years After line-up of Ric Lee, Chick Churchill, Bonfanti, and Colin Hodgkinson had split but that Lee intended to premiere a new line-up in early 2025.

== Discography ==
=== Albums ===
Year	Title	Record label
2008	Hard Times	P3 Music
2010	What Good Am I to You?	P3 Music
2011	Medicine Man	Self release (EP)
2013	Shake the Walls	Jig-Saw Music Ltd

== See also ==
- List of British blues musicians
