= I'd Love to Change the World =

1971 single by Ten Years After

Single by Ten Years After

from the album A Space in Time
- B-side: "Let the Sky Fall"
- Released: September 1971
- Genre: Psychedelic rock; folk rock
- Length: 3:44 (album version); 3:11 (single edit)
- Label: Columbia
- Songwriter: Alvin Lee
- Producer: Chris Wright

Ten Years After singles chronology
"Love Like a Man" (1970)	"I'd Love to Change the World" (1971)	"Baby Won't You Let Me Rock 'n' Roll You" (1972)

"I'd Love to Change the World" is a song by the British blues rock band Ten Years After. Written by Alvin Lee, it is the lead single from the band's 1971 album A Space in Time. It is the band's only US Top 40 hit, peaking at number 40 on the Billboard Hot 100, and was a top ten hit in Canada.

== Background and composition ==
The song was written and sung by Alvin Lee and features a folk-inspired chord pattern to support the melody. It discusses the confused state of the world, covering a wide variety of societal complaints, until it finally addresses the Vietnam War.

== Release and reception ==
"I'd Love to Change the World" was the band's highest charting single. It peaked at number 40 on the Billboard Hot 100 in 1971. When it was released, "I'd Love to Change the World" was a staple of both FM and AM radio, a rarity for the time.

Billy Walker of Sounds wrote that the "acoustic guitar, echoing vocals, and electric guitar build up the tempo with very good cool electric passages by Alvin [Lee], and while there's nothing new developing it's a very nice track". Matthew Greenwald of Allmusic highlighted Lee's guitar work as the "most expressive—and most tasteful—electric guitar performance of his career", and added "if there is a single song that can describe the overall vibe of the counterculture in 1969/1970, this may very well be it. The band and Lee never quite matched the song's supple power in their later efforts, but this song is representation enough of their awesome artistry."

== Use in other media ==
The song was featured in the films Crossing the Bridge, Apollo 11, Slums of Beverly Hills, Outside Providence, Fahrenheit 9/11, Tropic Thunder, The Last Supper, Our Brand Is Crisis, This Is Not Berlin and Minamata.

The song was also used in the episodes "Robbed a Stoner Blind" of the NBC series My Name Is Earl, "The Break" of the CBC series Caught, "Six Feet" of the TBS series Wrecked, "The Protean (No. 36)" of the NBC series The Blacklist, "Returning Point" of the AMC series The Walking Dead: World Beyond and the episode "Panopticon" of the CBS series Person of Interest, and the Supernatural prequel The CW series The Winchesters "Pilot".

In Greece, the song was used in commercials from 2009 until 2012 by telecommunications company Cosmote.

The song was featured in season 3, episode 7 of the British TV series Britannia.

The song was featured in the trailer for Amsterdam, a 2022 American comedy thriller.

The song was featured in the trailer for Death by Lightning, a 2025 American historical drama produced by Netflix.

== Personnel ==
- Alvin Lee – guitar and vocals
- Leo Lyons – bass
- Ric Lee – drums
- Chick Churchill – keyboards

== Chart performance ==
Chart (1971)	Peak position
U.S. Billboard Hot 100	40
U.S. Cash Box Top 100 Singles	28
Canada RPM 100 Singles	10

== Jetta version ==
"I'd Love to Change the World"

Single by Jetta
- Released: December 2014
- Length: 3:07; 3:09 (Matstubs remix)
- Label: Republic; Casablanca
- Songwriter: Alvin Lee
- Producer: Matstubs (remix)

Jetta singles chronology
"Crescendo" (2014)	"I'd Love to Change the World" (2014)	"Take It Easy" (2016)

Audio video
- "I'd Love to Change the World" on YouTube

Alternative cover
- Matstubs remix cover

Music video
- "I'd Love to Change the World (Matstubs Remix)" on YouTube

In 2014, British singer Jetta made a cover of the song. In December 2014, Canadian electronic DJ and producer Matstubs released a remix of her cover. It received significant attention after being posted online, earning Matstubs a contract with Casablanca Records. The remix was officially released through the label alongside Republic Records on 18 December 2015. By 2016, the track generated more than 32 million plays on Spotify and 85 million views on YouTube, with an official video for Matstub's remix being released the same year. In the video, Matstubs' parents make cameo appearances as victims of the golf-obsessed psychopath at the center of the story. Matt himself plays a factory worker operating a forklift, and the shoot was his first time meeting Jetta in person.

On 27 June 2017, the remix was certified gold in the US for selling 500,000 copies by the Recording Industry Association of America (RIAA). Elsewhere, Jetta's cover was featured in trailers for multiple films such as Dawn of the Planet of the Apes, Nightcrawler and Terminator Genisys.

=== Certifications ===
Certifications for "I'd Love to Change the World"
Region	Certification	Certified units/sales
United States (RIAA)	Gold	500,000^{‡}
^{‡} Sales+streaming figures based on certification alone.
