= David Kaff =

British musician and actor (1946–2025)

Background information
- Also known as: David Kaffinetti
- Born: 17 April 1946 Folkestone, Kent, England
- Died: 11 July 2025 (aged 79)
- Genres: Progressive rock
- Occupations: Musician; actor
- Instrument: Keyboards
- Formerly of: Rare Bird; Spinal Tap

David Kaff (17 April 1946 – 11 July 2025) was a British musician and actor. He was a member of Rare Bird in the 1970s, credited as David Kaffinetti. As a musician, he was perhaps best known as Viv Savage, keyboard player in the title band in the film This Is Spinal Tap (1984).

== Life and career ==
Kaff was born in Folkestone, Kent on 17 April 1946, as David Ewer, son of a physician and the artist, Peggy Ewer. He was a founding member of the progressive rock group Rare Bird from 1969 to 1975, who were one of the first bands to sign to Charisma Records. They released five studio albums between 1969 and 1974. In the UK singles chart, the organ-based single "Sympathy" reached number 27 in February 1970, selling an estimated one million globally.

He was cast to play Viv Savage, the keyboardist for the fictional rock band Spinal Tap, for their mockumentary This Is Spinal Tap (1984). The group continued as a band after the release of the film, making concert and live television appearances; Kaff (still playing Viv Savage) was involved in Spinal Tap's 1984 appearance on Saturday Night Live. By the end of that year, Kaff had left the group, and was not involved in subsequent Spinal Tap activity.

Kaff died on 11 July 2025, at the age of 79.
