= Joe Gooch =

English vocalist and guitarist

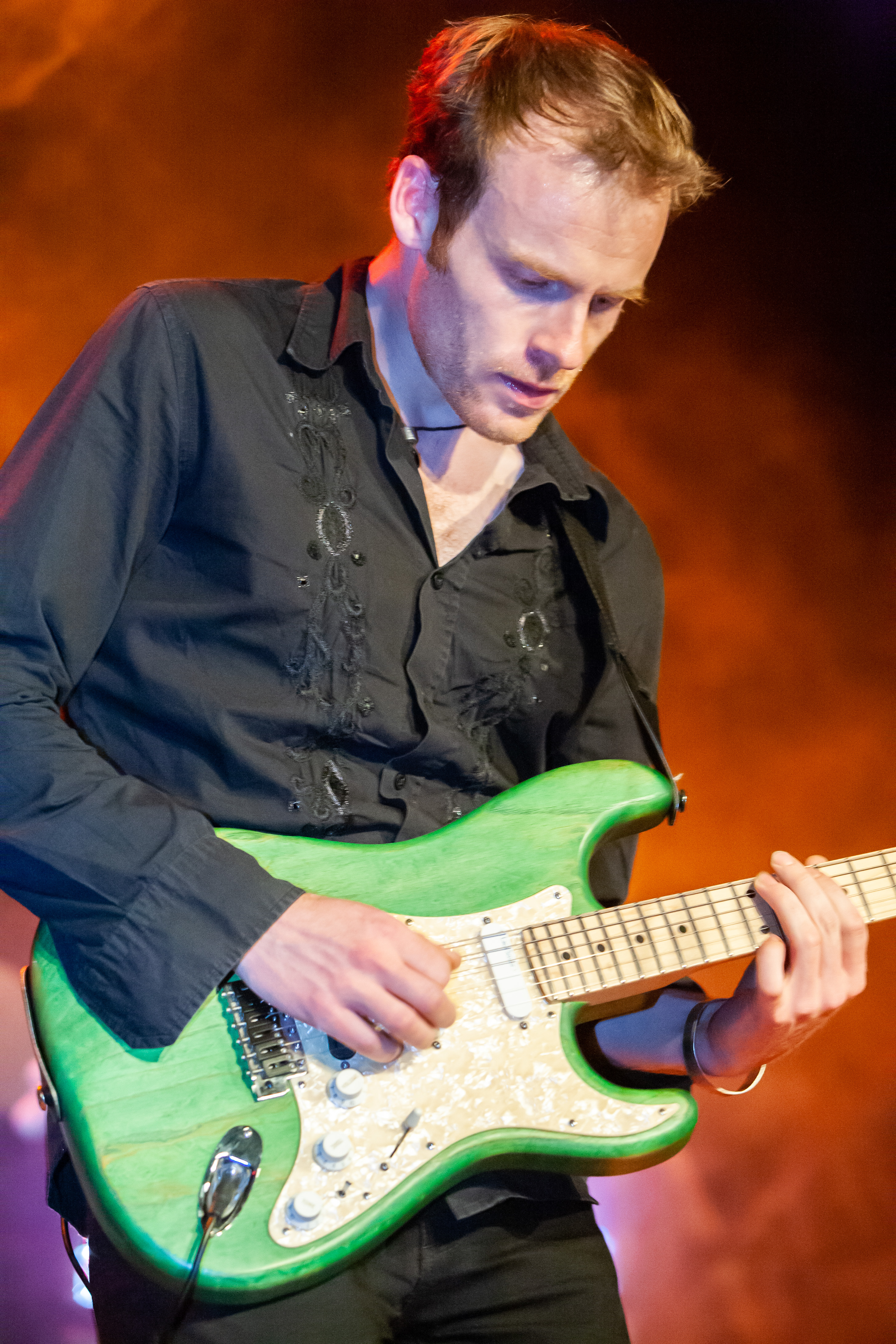
- Joe Gooch (2007)

Background information
- Born: 3 May 1977 (age 49); Highbury, London, England
- Genre: Blues rock
- Occupations: Musician, singer-songwriter
- Instruments: Vocals, guitar
- Years active: 2003–present

Joe Gooch (born 3 May 1977) is an English musician who was known as the lead vocalist and guitarist of Ten Years After from 2003 to 2014.

== Biography ==
Gooch was introduced to jazz and blues at an early age. By thirteen, taking his music seriously, he enrolled on a course of classical guitar lessons. The disciplines he learned were good grounding for him, but he soon realised his interest lay outside of the classical sphere, and moved towards rock and blues. At first he was influenced by his childhood heroes, Larry Carlton, Steely Dan, The Beatles, Jimi Hendrix, Eric Clapton, Led Zeppelin, Buddy Guy and later Frank Zappa. Gooch replaced Alvin Lee in Ten Years After, with limited success, and later formed Hundred Seventy Split with bassist Leo Lyons.

In January 2014, it was announced that both Gooch and Lyons had left Ten Years After.

== Album discography ==
SiRO

- SiRO – 1999

Ten Years After

- Now – 2004
- Roadworks (Live) – 2005
- Evolution – 2008
- Live at Fiesta City (DVD) – 2009

Hundred Seventy Split

- The World Won't Stop – 2011
- Hundred Seventy Split – 2014
