= In Tennessee =

Studio album by Alvin Lee
- Released: May 18, 2004
- Recorded: 2003
- Label: Repertoire

Alvin Lee chronology
Nineteen Ninety-Four (1994)	In Tennessee (2004)	Saguitar (2007)

In Tennessee is a studio album by Alvin Lee released on May 18, 2004.

== Background ==
It was recorded at two locations including Memphis Room and Scotty Moore's Blueberry Hill Studio.

== Reception ==
AllMusic described the album as "a terrific return to form, arguably Lee's best and certainly most passionate solo album ever, as well as a sizzling performance throughout," giving it a rating of four stars.

== Track listing ==
All tracks composed by Alvin Lee.

No.	Title	Length
1.	"Let's Boogie"	3:33
2.	"Rock And Roll Girls"	3:38
3.	"Take My Time"	4:45
4.	"I'm Gonna Make It"	6:10
5.	"Something's Gonna Get You"	4:47
6.	"Why Did You Do It"	4:47
7.	"Getting Nowhere Fast"	4:40
8.	"How Do You Do It"	5:00
9.	"Let's Get It On"	5:25
10.	"Tell Me Why"	5:52
11.	"I'm Going Home"	6:13
Total length:		54:50

== Personnel ==
Credits for In Tennessee adapted from AllMusic.

- Alvin Lee – composer, guitar, primary artist, vocals
- D.J. Fontana – drums, guest artist
- Ed Spyra – cover illustration
- EROC – mastering
- John Fowlie – design, layout design
- Little Willie Rainsford – piano
- Peter Pritchard – double bass
- Scotty Moore – guest artist, guitar
- Steve Shepherd – tape operator
- Tim Hinkley – organ (Hammond)
- Trevor Morais – mixing

== Info ==
- Repertoire Records (UK) Limited
- CD No: REPUK 1029
- EAN: 4009910102923
