= Rare Bird =

English progressive rock band

- Origin: England
- Genres: Progressive rock
- Years active: 1969–1975
- Labels: Charisma; Polydor
- Past members: Steve Gould; David Kaffinetti; Graham Field; Mark Ashton

Rare Bird were an English progressive rock band, formed in 1969. They released five studio albums between 1969 and 1974. In the UK, the single "Sympathy" reached number 27 in February 1970, selling an estimated one million globally. The band was notable for its organ-driven sound, utilising two keyboardists and no guitar in its original line-up.

== History ==
=== 1968–1969: Formation, Rare Bird, and "Sympathy" ===
In August 1968, organist Graham Field formed a group called Lunch and banded together with keyboardist David Kaffinetti. The group was short-lived and the two members began looking for a rhythm section for a new project.

By late 1969, they had found singer and bassist Steve Gould and drummer Mark Ashton. Former members of the pop-psych band Fruit Machine Gould and Chris Randall had originally joined as guitarist and bassist respectively, but Field and Kaffinetti envisioned a band without guitar so they asked Randall to leave and convinced Gould to take up bass and vocals. Before joining the band, Randall and Gould had written a song called "To the Memory of Two Brave Dogs" which would be included as the opening track to their debut album under the name "Iceberg", for which Randall would receive no credit.

Now that the band had established a stable line-up, they recorded a demo which attracted the attention of Tony Stratton Smith. As the band still had no name, Ashton and Smith came up with Rare Bird. Shortly after, Rare Bird became one of the first bands signed to Charisma Records, along with Van der Graaf Generator and the Nice.

Within a matter of weeks, the band had begun recording their eponymous debut album, Rare Bird, released in November 1969. According to Ashton, the album was recorded over the course of just a few days at Trident Studios, using a Hammond B3 organ, an electric piano, a Gibson bass and a Ludwig drum kit. From Rare Bird, the single "Sympathy" was released, which reached No. 1 in Italy and France, and is estimated to have sold 500,000 copies in France and between one and three million globally. It became their only UK hit single, reaching No. 27 and staying on the chart for 8 weeks.

=== 1970–1974: Later releases and line-up changes ===
In 1970, Rare Bird released their second studio album, As Your Mind Flies By, which was the last to feature their original line-up. Despite favourable reception, the album failed to chart in both the UK and the US. Due to the lack of commercial success, the band was dropped from Charisma.

The band made live TV appearances on programmes such as Top of the Tops and Disco 2 in the UK and Beat Club in Germany in 1970, as well as the Old Grey Whistle Test in 1971. Rare Bird also performed at Jazz Bilzen in August 1970.

In early 1971, Field left Rare Bird to form a short-lived solo project called the Fields, releasing one album with CBS in 1971. Shortly after, Mark Ashton left to form Headstone, releasing two albums with Trident Productions in 1974 and 1975.

A major personnel change in 1972 had Gould move to rhythm guitar, Kaffinetti remain on keyboards, Paul Karas join on bass, Andy Curtis take up lead guitar, and Fred Kelly join on drums. With this line-up the band recorded Epic Forest, marking a change in direction for the band, veering away from some of the classical-inspired themes of the previous two albums and moving towards a more mainstream progressive rock sound. This was their first album to be released on Polydor Records.

The band's fourth album, Somebody's Watching, came about after Nic Potter replaced Karas on bass in 1973. The final track "Dollars" includes extracts from "A Few Dollars More" and features a guest appearance from King Crimson bassist John Wetton.

Rare Bird recorded their final album, Born Again, in 1974. At this point, roadie Andy Rae had replaced Potter on bass and Curtis had quit, leaving the band as it had started; a four piece. The band also performed at the Dagenham Roundhouse on 8 June 1974, supporting Barclay James Harvest.

=== 1975 onwards: Break-up and legacy ===
Following the continuous commercial failures that had been their last three albums, Rare Bird disbanded in 1975. They had run out of money and had "fizzled out" according to Gould.

In 1977, Gould went on to form the rock band Runner, releasing one album before they broke up. In 1980, he played bass in Alvin Lee's band for two decades.

Kaffinetti eventually went on to play Viv Savage in the mockumentary This Is Spinal Tap (1984).

== Members ==
=== Original line-up ===
- Graham Field – organ, keyboards (1969–1971)
- David Kaffinetti – keyboards (1969–1975)
- Steve Gould – bass, vocals (1969–1975)
- Mark Ashton – drums, percussion, backing vocals (1969–1971)

=== 1972 onwards ===
In addition to Steve Gould (guitar, vocals) and David Kaffinetti (keyboards, organ):

- Paul Karas – bass, vocals (1972)
- Andy Curtis – lead guitar (1972–1973)
- Fred Kelly – drums, percussion (1972–1975)
- Nic Potter – bass (1973)
- Andy Rae – bass (1974–1975)
- John Wetton – guest appearance; bass on "Dollars" (1973)
- Paul Holland – producer (1972–1973)

== Discography ==
=== Studio albums ===
Rare Bird released five studio albums.

- Rare Bird (UK: Charisma, U.S.: Command/Probe, 1969) U.S. # 115 (13 w)
- As Your Mind Flies By (UK: Charisma, U.S.: ABC, 1970)
- Epic Forest (Polydor, 1972) U.S. # 194 (2 w)
- Somebody's Watching (Polydor, 1973)
- Born Again (Polydor, June 1974)

=== Singles ===
- "Sympathy" b/w "Devils High Concern" (UK No. 27, 14 February 1970)/US No. 121, 11 March 1970 / F # 3 / #82 CAN)
- "Roadside Welcome"/"Four Grey Walls" b/w "You're Lost" Uncharted UK Polydor 2814 011 (1972)
- "Birdman -Part One" (Title No. 1 Again) US No. 122, 1 September 1973)

=== Compilation albums ===
- Attention! Rare Bird (Fontana cat. no. 9299 008; 1972)
- Rare Bird (Polydor cat. # 2384 078, a budget re-release, compiling tracks from their three albums on Polydor; released in the Polydor Special series in 1977)
- Sympathy (Blue Plate, 1976)
- Third Time Around: An Introduction to Rare Bird (Universal, 2003)
- Beautiful Scarlet: The Recordings 1969-1975 (Esoteric Recordings cat. no. ECLEC62756; 2021; box set of all their albums and singles, plus their complete concert at the Theatre Royal in 1974, previously unreleased)
