= RX5 (album) =

Studio album by the Alvin Lee Band
- Released: 1981
- Genre: Rock
- Length: 38:54
- Label: Atlantic
- Producer: John Stronach

The Alvin Lee Band chronology
Free Fall (1980)	RX5 (1981)	Detroit Diesel (1986)

RX5 is a studio album by the rock band the Alvin Lee Band, released in 1981.

== Critical reception ==
Professional ratings
Review scores
Source	Rating
The Virgin Encyclopedia of the Blues	3/4 stars

People praised the album, writing that it "recaptures the dizzying incandescence found only on the very finest albums of pure rock ... The power chords and lightning runs seem to uncoil from Lee’s smoking ax." Billboard called it a "strong effort" on which "the energy level remains high from first cut to last."

== Track listing ==
All tracks composed by Steve Gould; except where noted

1. "Hang On" – 3:46
2. "Lady Luck" – 3:04
3. "Can't Stop" (Alvin Lee) – 5:09
4. "Wrong Side of the Law" (Dek Rootham, Dave Robson) – 3:10
5. "Nutbush City Limits" (Tina Turner) – 3:50
6. "Rock 'n' Roll Guitar Picker" (Alvin Lee) – 3:05
7. "Double Loser" (Alvin Lee) – 2:55
8. "Fool No More" (Steve Gould, Mick Feat) – 5:10
9. "Dangerous World" – 3:40
10. "High Times" – 5:25

== Personnel ==
- Alvin Lee – guitar, vocals
- Steve Gould – guitar, vocals
- Mickey Feat – bass guitar, vocals
- Tom Compton – drums, percussion
- Chris Stainton – keyboards

== Artwork ==
- The album's artwork was made by Derek Riggs, who is famous for his work with Iron Maiden.
