= Love Like a Man =

Single by Ten Years After

from the album Cricklewood Green
- B-side: "Love Like a Man" (live version)
- Released: 22 May 1970
- Genre: Blues rock
- Length: 3:05
- Label: Deram
- Songwriter: Alvin Lee
- Producer: Ten Years After

Ten Years After singles chronology
"Working on the Road" (1969)	"Love Like a Man" (1970)	"I'd Love to Change the World" (1971)

"Love Like a Man" is a song and hit single by British blues rock group Ten Years After, first released in 1970 and taken from their album Cricklewood Green.

== Singles chart success ==
The single is the group's only hit in the UK Singles Chart. Written by the group's lead vocalist Alvin Lee and produced by the group, it was the band's fourth single. The song entered the UK chart at number 48 in June 1970 and reached number 10 in August, finally leaving the chart in October 1970. In the US, it reached number 98 in the Billboard Hot 100. In Canada, it reached number 56.

Unusually, the A-side of this single is to be played at 45 rpm whilst the B-side is to be played at 33⅓ RPM. The B-side is a live version of the song recorded at Bill Graham's Fillmore East and runs at 7:56 in marked contrast to the A-side's shorter, 3:05. Earlier versions of the disc carried no mention that the B-side is 'live' only an overprint in black ink on the paper label that the playing speed is 33⅓ RPM.
