= Steve Gould (musician) =

- Born: 25 March 1950 (age 76); Battersea, London, England
- Genres: Progressive rock
- Occupations: Musician; songwriter
- Instruments: Vocals; bass guitar; guitar
- Label: Island
- Formerly of: Rare Bird; Runner

Steve Gould (born 25 March 1950) is an English singer and musician who was the lead vocalist and bassist (later, rhythm guitarist) of the late 1960s to mid 1970s London-based progressive rock band, Rare Bird. They had one hit single titled "Sympathy", which peaked at No. 27 in the UK singles chart.

Gould went on to form the short-lived rock band Runner on Island Records in 1977 after Rare Bird broke up. The band's eponymous debut studio album charted in the Billboard 200.

When Runner did not work out due to differences with the label, Gould joined the Alvin Lee band in 1980, with whom he played bass guitar on different occasions during two decades. On studio albums such as Free Fall (1980) and RX5 (1981) he played an active role as vocalist and co-composer.
