= Ten Years After =

English blues rock band

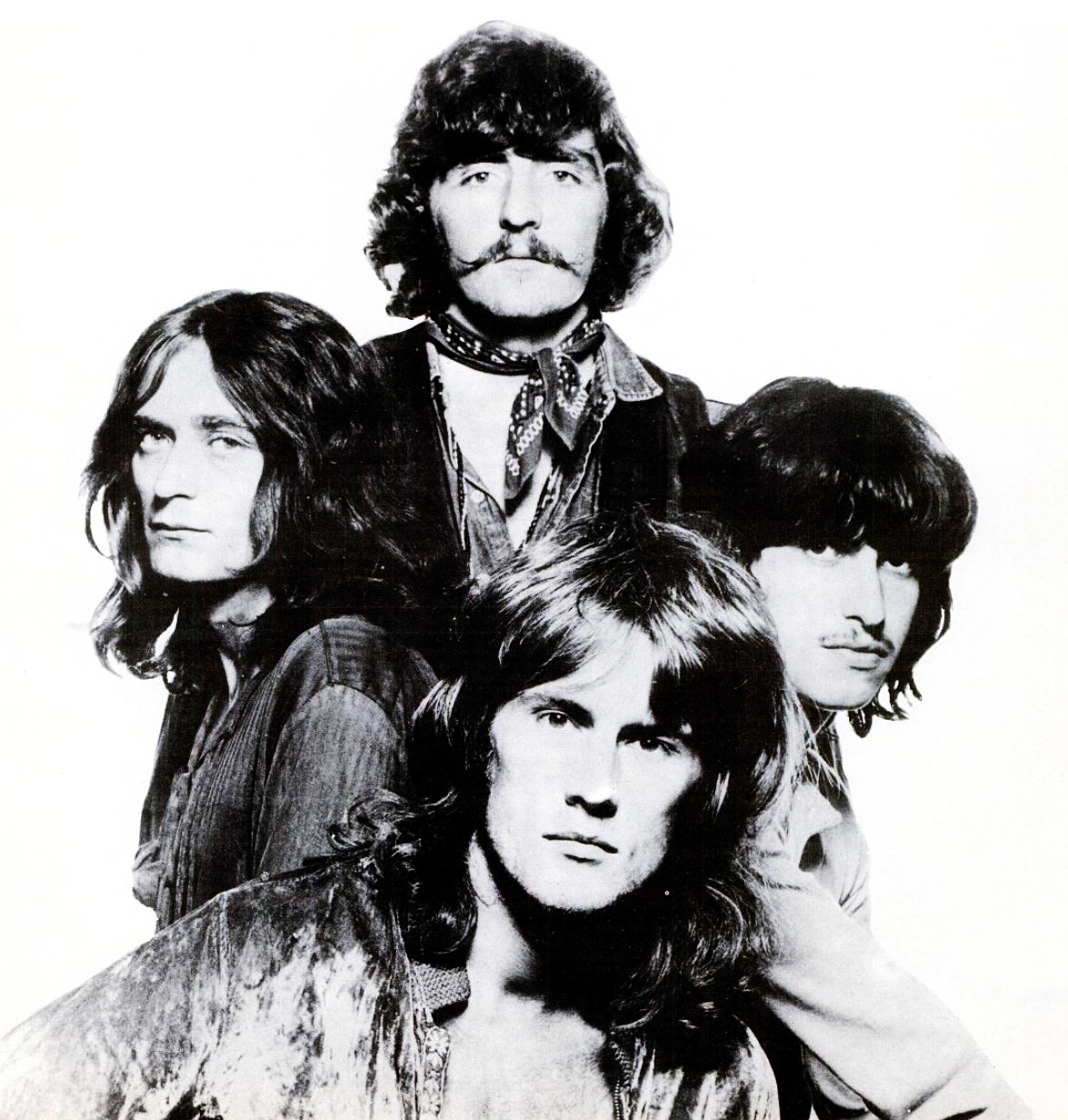
- Ten Years After in 1970. Leo Lyons (top), Chick Churchill (left), Ric Lee (right), Alvin Lee (front)

Background information
- Origin: Nottingham, England
- Genre: Blues rock
- Years active: 1966–1975; 1983 (one-off reunion); 1988–2024; 2025–present
- Labels: PolyGram; Deram; Chrysalis; EMI; CBS
- Members: Ric Lee; Samuel C. Lees; Craig Fletcher; Dave Burgoyne
- Past members: Alvin Lee; Leo Lyons; Joe Gooch; Chick Churchill; Marcus Bonfanti; Colin Hodgkinson
- Website: ten-years-after.co.uk

Ten Years After are an English blues rock group formed in Nottingham in 1966. They had eight consecutive albums in the Top 40 on the UK Albums Chart between 1968 and 1973. They also had twelve albums enter the US Billboard 200. The band are best known for tracks such as "I'm Going Home", "Hear Me Calling", "I'd Love to Change the World" and "Love Like a Man".

== History ==
=== Formation: 1962–1966 ===
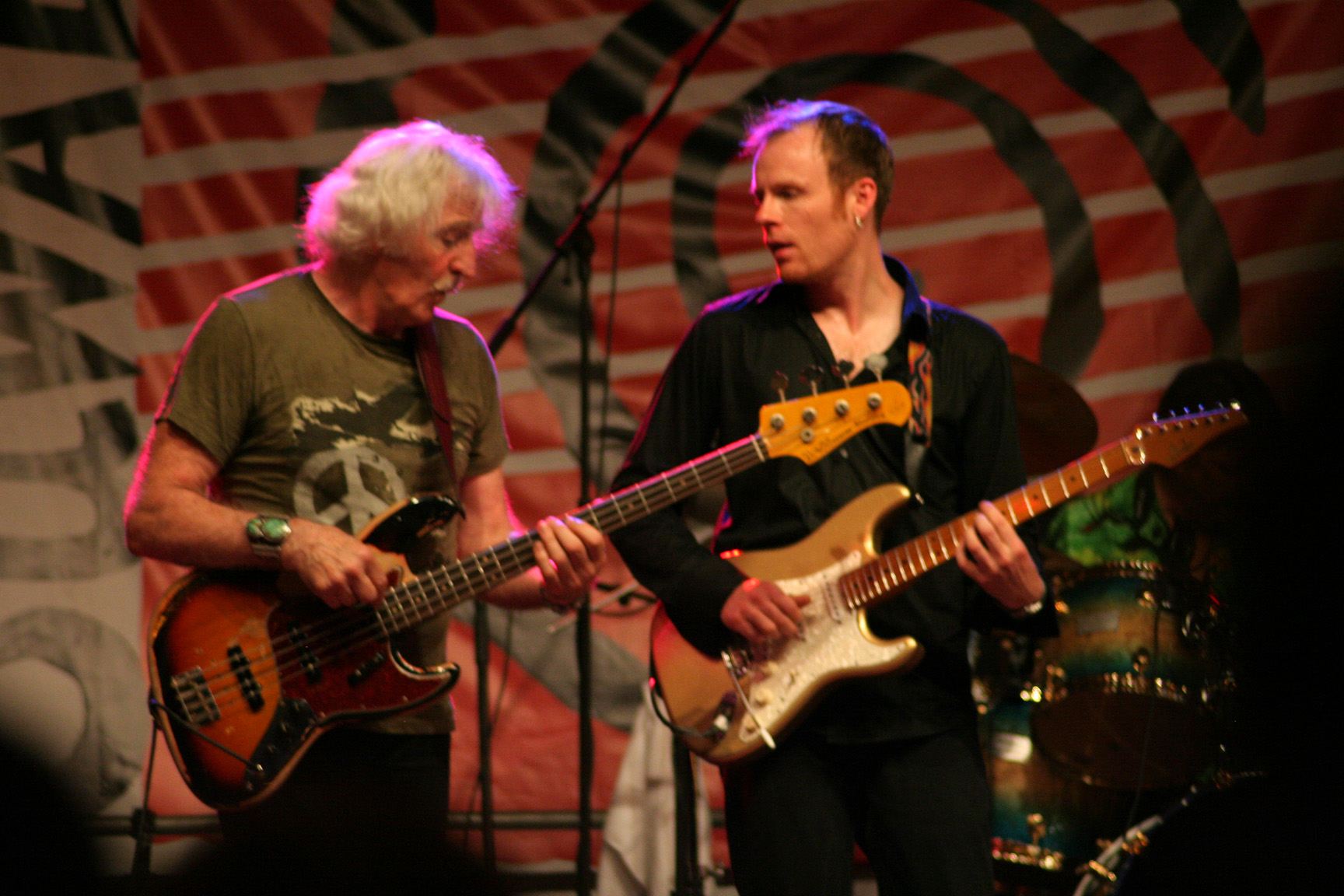
Leo Lyons and Joe Gooch of Ten Years After at Suwałki Blues Festival, 2009

The band's core formed in late 1960 as Ivan Jay and the Jaycats. After several years of local success in the Nottingham/Mansfield area, they changed their name to the Jaybirds in 1962, and later to Ivan Jay and the Jaymen. Ivan Jay sang lead vocals from late 1960 to 1962 and was joined by Ric Lee in August 1965, replacing drummer Dave Quickmire, who had replaced Pete Evans in 1962. Roy Cooper played rhythm guitar and sang from 1960 to 1962. The Jaybirds moved to London to back the Ivy League in 1966.

Chick Churchill joined the group as keyboard player in 1966. That November, the quartet signed a manager, Chris Wright, and changed their name to Blues Trip. As Blues Yard, they played one show at the Marquee Club supporting the Bonzo Dog Doo-Dah Band. Alvin Lee and Leo Lyons again changed their name in 1966 to Ten Years After – in honour of Elvis Presley, one of Lee's idols. (This was ten years after Presley's breakout year, 1956.) Some sources claim that the name was pulled by Leo Lyons from a magazine, advertising a book, Suez Ten Years After (referring to the Suez Crisis).

=== Ten Years After: 1967–1974 ===
The group was the first act booked by the soon-to-be Chrysalis Agency. They secured a residency at the Marquee and were invited to play at the Windsor Jazz Festival in 1967. That performance led to a contract with Deram, a subsidiary of Decca – they were the first band without a hit single that Deram signed. In October 1967, they released the self-titled debut album Ten Years After. In 1968, after touring Scandinavia and the United States, they released a second LP, the live album Undead, with a first version of the song "I'm Going Home".

The group followed this in February 1969 with the studio issue Stonedhenge, a British hit that included another well-known track, "Hear Me Calling", which was released as a single (and was covered by the British glam rock band Slade in 1972). In July 1969, the group appeared at the first Newport Jazz Festival to invite rock bands. On 26 and 27 July 1969, they appeared at the Seattle Pop Festival held at Gold Creek Park. On 17 August, the band made a breakthrough American appearance at the Woodstock Festival; their rendition of "I'm Going Home," with Alvin Lee as lead singer/lead guitarist, was featured in both the subsequent film and soundtrack album and increased the group's popularity. In 1970, Ten Years After released "Love Like a Man", the group's only hit in the UK Singles Chart, where it peaked at No. 10. It was the first record issued with a different playing speed on each side: a three-minute edit at 45 rpm, and a nearly eight-minute live version at 33 rpm. The full studio version of the song appeared on the band's fifth album, their most successful in Britain, Cricklewood Green. In August 1970, they played the Strawberry Fields Festival near Toronto, and the Isle of Wight Festival 1970.

In 1971, the band switched labels to Columbia Records (US) and Chrysalis (UK) and released the hit album A Space in Time, which marked a move toward more commercial material. It featured the group's biggest hit, "I'd Love to Change the World". In late 1972, the group issued their second Columbia album Rock & Roll Music to the World and, in 1973, the live double album Ten Years After Recorded Live. The band broke up after their final 1974 Columbia album, Positive Vibrations.

=== Post-break-up, then reunion ===
In the second half of the 1970s and early 1980s, Alvin Lee toured with a new band he called Ten Years Later.

The original Ten Years After reunited in 1983 to play the Reading Festival, and this performance was later released on CD as The Friday Rock Show Sessions – Live at Reading '83.

In 1988, the members reunited for a few concerts and recorded the album About Time (1989) with producer Terry Manning in Memphis. They stayed together for their longest continuous period, until 2003, though without releasing new material. In 1994, they participated in the Eurowoodstock festival in Budapest.

In 2003, the other band members replaced Alvin Lee with Joe Gooch, and recorded the album Now. Material from the subsequent tour was used for the 2005 double album Roadworks. Alvin Lee mostly played and recorded under his own name following his split from the band. He died from complications during a routine medical procedure on 6 March 2013. Ric Lee is currently in a band called Ric Lee's Natural Born Swingers, along with Bob Hall. In January 2014, it was announced that Gooch and Lyons had left Ten Years After. Two months later, veteran bass player Colin Hodgkinson and singer/guitarist Marcus Bonfanti were announced as their replacements. In October 2017, the band released its most recent studio album, A Sting in the Tale.

In September 2024, it was announced that Lee, Churchill, Bonfanti, and Hodgkinson had split, and Lee intended to debut a new lineup in early 2025. In early 2025, the group announced a new lineup consisting of Ric Lee, Samuel C Lees, Craig Fletcher, and Dave Burgoyne. This new lineup currently has shows announced in both the UK and Europe.

== Band members ==
Current members

- Ric Lee – drums (1966–1974, 1983, 1988–present)
- Samuel C Lees – guitar, vocals (2025–present)
- Craig Fletcher – bass guitar, vocals (2025-present)
- Dave Burgoyne – keyboards, violin (2025–present)

Former members

- Chick Churchill – keyboards (1966–1974, 1983, 1988–2024)
- Alvin Lee – guitar, vocals, harmonica (1966–1974, 1983, 1988–2003; died 2013)
- Leo Lyons – bass (1966–1974, 1983, 1988–2014)
- Joe Gooch – guitar, vocals (2003–2014)
- Marcus Bonfanti – guitar, vocals, harmonica (2014–2024)
- Colin Hodgkinson – bass (2014–2024)

Timeline

== Discography ==
- Ten Years After (1967)
- Undead (1968; 14 May 1968, live at Klooks Kleek, London)
- Stonedhenge (1969)
- Ssssh (1969)
- Cricklewood Green (1970)
- Watt (1970)
- A Space in Time (1971)
- Rock & Roll Music to the World (1972)
- Recorded Live (1973; 26–29 January 1973, live in Frankfurt, Rotterdam, Amsterdam and Paris)
- Positive Vibrations (1974)
- About Time (1989)
- Now (2004)
- Evolution (2008)
- A Sting in the Tale (2017)
