= Sympathy (Rare Bird song) =

Single by Rare Bird
- Released: 1970
- Genre: Progressive rock
- Label: Charisma (UK), Philips (Scandinavia, Italy and Greece)
- Songwriter: Rare Bird

"Sympathy" is a song by the English progressive rock band Rare Bird. It became the band's only UK chart entry when it peaked at number 27 in the UK Singles Chart in 1970. The song reached No. 1 in Italy and in France, selling 500,000 copies in France and between one and three million globally. The song peaked at number 98 in Australia, becoming the group's only top 100 appearance there. In Canada it reached #83.

The lyrics reflect on "those out in the cold at night, because there's not enough love to go 'round" and asks for sympathy towards the poor and hungry people in the world. Steve Rowland, who covered the song in 1970, stated: "Sympathy is about people dying from hunger, about lack of sympathy and the dire situation in the world." He also added it has a timeless appeal, given world's misery.

The cover art features a painting by Marc Harrison titled The Birdwoman Of Zartacla (also used for the cover of the June 1981 issue of the Heavy Metal magazine).

== Cover versions ==
The single was covered by at least 300 artists, the most notable of which:

- A 1970 cover version of the track by The Family Dogg reached number one in the Netherlands for two weeks.
- In 1970 Caterina Caselli covered the song in an Italian version titled: L'umanità
- In 1985 Toyah covered the song
- In 1992 a version by Marillion reached number 17 in the UK, becoming their 17th Top 40 hit.
- In 2001 Faithless sampled the song on their album track "Not Enuff Love"
