= Chick Churchill =

English keyboard player

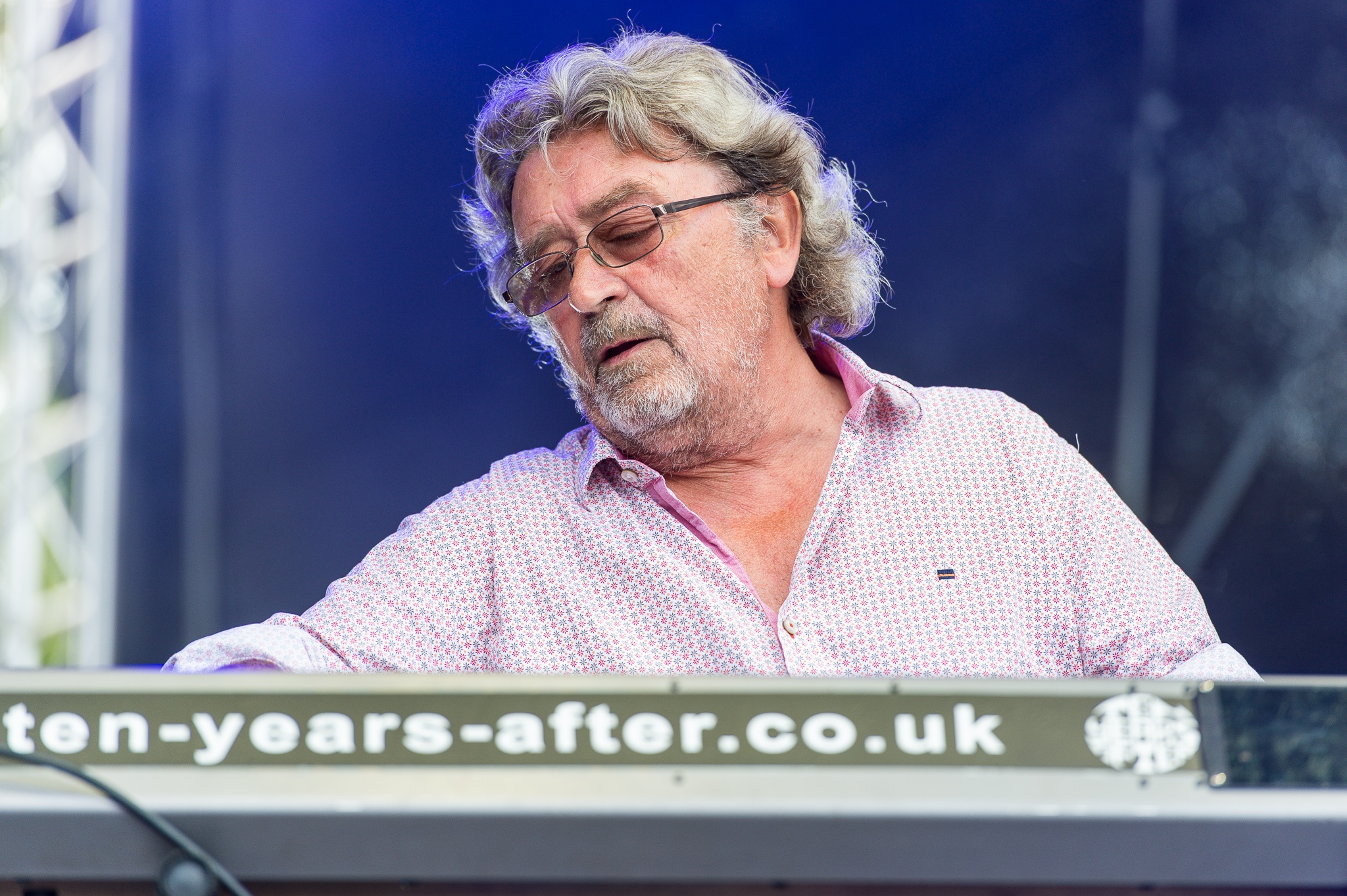
- Chick Churchill in 2015

Background information
- Born: Michael George Churchill; 2 January 1946 (age 80); Ilkeston, Derbyshire, England
- Genres: Blues rock, blues, rock
- Occupations: Musician, songwriter, record producer
- Instruments: Keyboards, piano, organ, synthesizer
- Years active: 1960s–present
- Labels: Decca, Deram, Columbia, Chrysalis

Michael George "Chick" Churchill (born 2 January 1946) is an English keyboard player, who was with the blues rock band Ten Years After.

== Early career ==
Churchill began playing the piano at the age of six and studied classical music until he was 15. He became interested in blues and rock music, and joined his first band Sons of Adam in Nottingham, as a pianist/keyboardist.

== Ten Years After ==
In the 1960s, Churchill met Alvin Lee of The Jaybirds, who were the backing band for The Ivy League at the time. At first, Churchill joined the band as its road manager, but he soon became the keyboard player. When he was their road manager, he managed to get the band an audition at the Marquee Club in London. In November 1966, there was a name change to Ten Years After. With this group, Churchill played at major rock festivals including the Woodstock music festival in 1969 (where they performed the songs "Spoonful", "Good Morning Little Schoolgirl", "Hobbit", "I Can't Keep from Crying Sometimes", "Help Me", and "I'm Going Home"), and the Isle of Wight Festival on 29 August 1970.

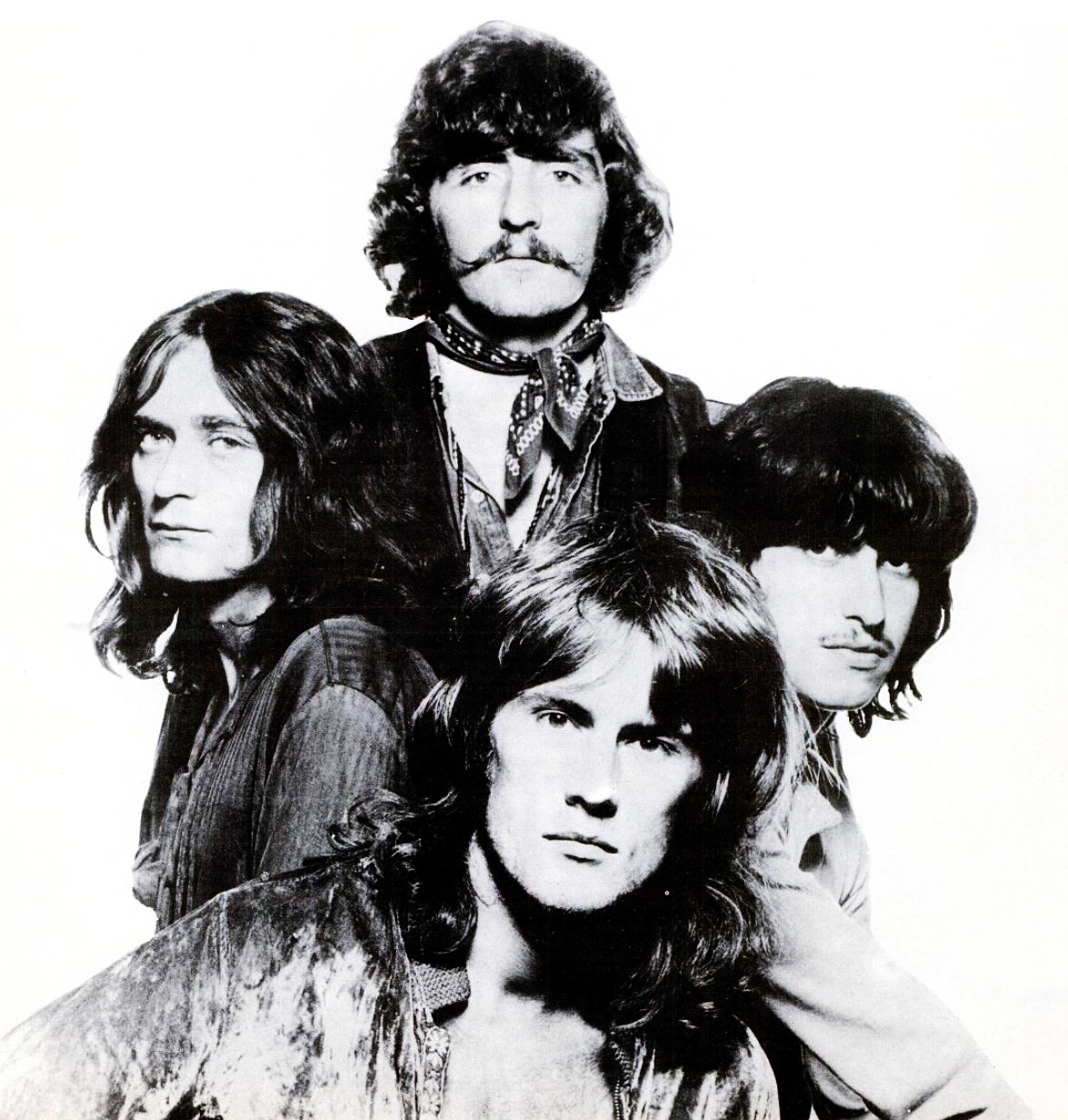
Churchill (left) and Ten Years After in 1970

Churchill has been in Ten Years After since joining in 1966. He has played on all their records, including their best known tracks "Love Like a Man" (1970) and "I'd Love to Change the World" (1971). In 1973, he recorded a solo album You and Me featuring Rick Davies and Roger Hodgson of Supertramp, Martin Barre of Jethro Tull, and Cozy Powell.

Ten Years After re-formed in 1983 for the Marquee Club's 25th Anniversary, performed two large European festivals in Belgium and Switzerland and were special guests at the Reading Festival. In September 2024, it was announced that the Ten Years After line-up of Ric Lee, Churchill, Marcus Bonfanti, and Colin Hodgkinson had split but that Lee intended to premiere a new line-up in early 2025.

== Other works ==
Ten Years After broke up in 1974 and Churchill became a professional manager at Chrysalis Music; the company was then owned by his own manager, Chris Wright. In 1977, he left to found Whitsett Churchill Music Publishing with Tim Whitsett, publishing and promoting American artists, especially from the south of the United States, where Whitsett came from.

Following on from this, Churchill furthered the career of 'The News', a group he managed and signed to a lucrative deal with Polydor Records.

== Discography ==
=== Ten Years After ===
- Ten Years After discography

=== Solo ===
- Album: You and Me – 1973
- Single: "Broken Engagements" / "Dream of Our Maker Man" – 1973
- Single: "You and Me" / "Come and Join Me" – 1974
