= Ric Lee =

English drummer (born 1945)

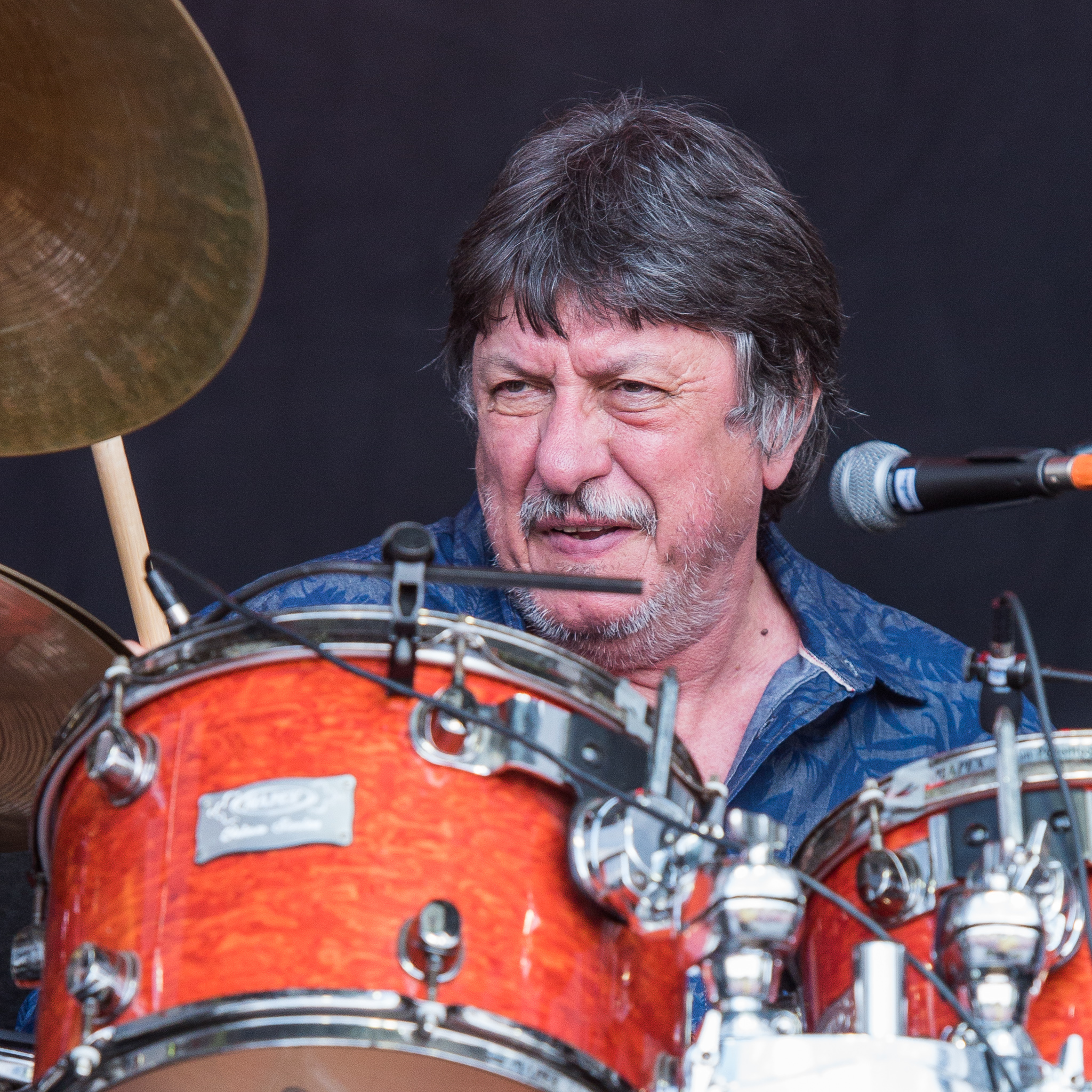
- Ric Lee in 2015

Background information
- Born: Richard Lee; 20 October 1945 (age 80); Mansfield, Nottinghamshire, England
- Genres: Blues rock, blues, rock
- Occupations: Musician, songwriter, record producer, music publisher
- Instruments: Drums, percussion
- Years active: 1963–present
- Labels: Decca, Deram, Columbia, Chrysalis, Capitol, PolyGram

Richard "Ric" Lee (born 20 October 1945) is an English drummer of the blues rock band Ten Years After.

== Ten Years After ==
He was a founding member of his first band, The Falcons, and was also a drummer for Ricky Storm and The Mansfields, which he was persuaded to leave in August 1965. Soon he took over drumming duties for The Jaybirds, with guitarist Alvin Lee (no relation), and bassist Leo Lyons.

In 1966 they arrived in London, where a keyboardist, Chick Churchill also joined the band. In 1967, Churchill got the band an audition at the Marquee Club in London under the name The Blues Yard, but quickly became the successful outfit, Ten Years After. With this group, Lee played at rock festivals including Woodstock in 1969 (where they performed the songs "Spoonful", "Good Morning Little Schoolgirl", "Hobbit", "I Can't Keep from Crying Sometimes", "Help Me", and "I'm Going Home"), and the Isle of Wight Festival on 29 August 1970 as well as appearances at the Newport Jazz Festival, the Miami, Atlanta and Texas Pop Festivals.

Ten Years After continued touring after Alvin Lee's death (on 6 March 2013). Ric Lee has been in Ten Years After since the group was formed in 1966. He has played on all their records, including their best known tracks "Love Like a Man" (1970) and "I'd Love to Change the World" (1971), and still tours with them as of 2023 with original keyboardist Chick Churchill, and two new members: guitarist/vocalist Marcus Bonfanti (British Blues Awards winner) and bassist Colin Hodgkinson. This incarnation released its first studio album, A Sting in the Tale, in 2017.

In September 2024, it was announced that the Ten Years After line-up of Lee, Churchill, Bonfanti, and Hodgkinson had split but that Lee intended to premiere a new line-up in early 2025.

== Other works ==
When Ten Years After disbanded in 1976, Lee formed March Music/Fast Western Productions undertaking music publishing, management and record production and signed acts such as the Incredible Kidda Band. He was rumored to be potential replacement in 1980 for the deceased John Bonham in Led Zeppelin, but the band decided to disband in honor of their band-mate. However, in 1980, Lee instead became the drummer for Chicken Shack. He left the following year.

In 1994, Lee formed 'The Breakers' with an old friend, Ian Ellis (ex-Clouds) and together they wrote and produced their first studio album MILAN, which was released in July 1995. Along with tours of the UK and Europe, 'The Breakers' were guests with Bryan Adams and Bonnie Raitt, on NBC Super Channel's "Talking Blues" programme that aired in Europe in March 1996.

In 2000, Ric Lee joined Kim Simmonds and Nathaniel Perterson in Savoy Brown for a European tour.

In 2011, Lee formed the 'Ric Lee Blues Project' which was later renamed 'Ric Lee's Natural Born Swingers' for their 2012 album release Put a Record On. The band featured Bob Hall of Savoy Brown, Danny Handley from the Animals and British session bassist Scott Whitley who has worked with many major acts from around the world. The album received substantial airplay on European and internet radio. Handley and Whitely have left the band. John Idan, known for his work with the reformed Yardbirds, joined the band on guitar and vocals.

Lee's autobiography From Headstocks To Woodstock was published by Grafika in May 2019.

== Personal life ==
Lee was born in Mansfield, Nottinghamshire, England. It was through his eldest brother Peter that Lee first got interested in music.

His jazz influences included Gene Krupa and Buddy Rich, whereas in the burgeoning pop scene of the 1960s, they had included Ringo Starr and Bobby Elliott.

He has two children and lives in the Derbyshire Dales.
