= Leo Lyons =

English musician (born 1943)

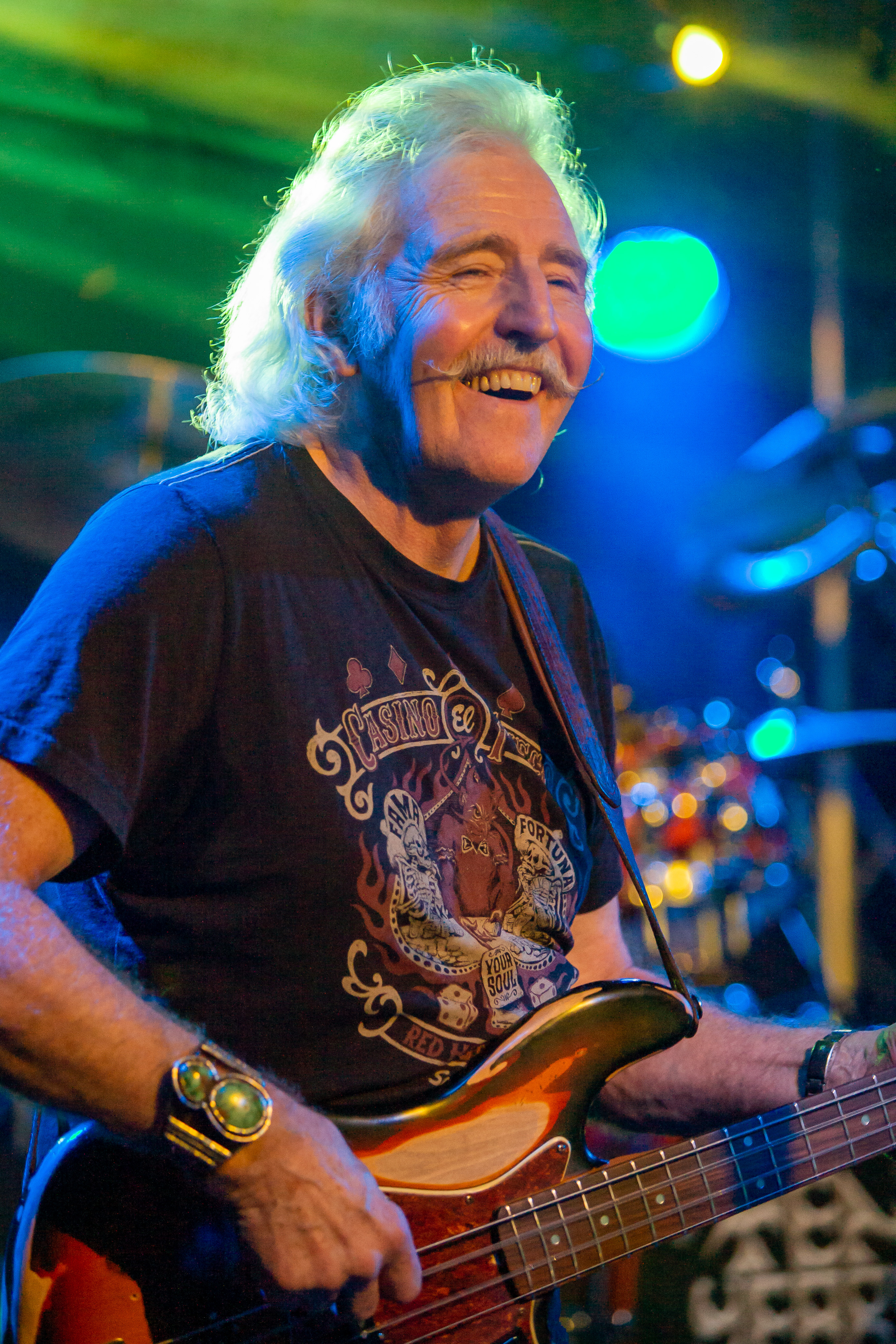
- Leo Lyons (2010)

Background information
- Born: Leo David William Lyons; 30 November 1943 (age 82); Mansfield, Nottinghamshire, England
- Genres: Blues rock, blues, rock
- Occupations: Musician, songwriter, record producer
- Instrument: Bass guitar
- Years active: 1960–present
- Labels: Decca, Deram, Columbia, Chrysalis, EMI ((Corner House Records))
- Website: www.leolyons.org

Leo David William Lyons (born 30 November 1943) is an English musician, who was most known as the bassist of the blues rock band Ten Years After.

== Biography ==
Leo Lyons was born in Mansfield, Nottinghamshire in November 1943 and became a professional musician at the age of 16. In 1962, along with band-mate Alvin Lee, his band The Jaybirds performed at The Star Club in Hamburg, Germany. Lyons was also hired to play in the club's house band, along with Tony Sheridan. Simultaneously, he performed at the Top Ten Club with featured guitarist Albert Lee. (not to be confused with Alvin Lee)

In 1963, The Jaybirds returned to England, securing their first recording contract with legendary record producer Joe Meek. From 1963 to 1966, Lyons both played in and managed The Jaybirds. Simultaneously, Lyons worked as a session musician, toured with pop acts of the day, appeared in a play in London's West End, and played a residency in an exclusive London nightclub with British jazz guitarist Denny Wright.

In 1967, The Jaybirds changed their name to Ten Years After. The band established residency at London's famous Marquee Club, and published a debut album on Deram Records. The hard-working band built a large following in Europe. After Fillmore West founder Bill Graham heard a copy of the band's first album, he immediately sent a letter offering to book Ten Years After on an extended tour in the United States. As part of Ten Years After, Lyons was one of the first rock performers at the Newport Jazz Festival.

In August 1969, the band's encore performance of "I’m Going Home" was captured on film at The Woodstock Music and Arts Festival, exposing their jazz, blues, and rock amalgam to larger audiences of moviegoers through the concert film. From 1969 to 1975, the group toured consistently. Lyons estimates the band performed for more than 75,000 new fans each week.

In 1975, Lyons worked in record production at Chrysalis Records as a studio manager for the Wessex Studios in London. Building on these experiences, Lyons built two commercial studios. As a producer, Lyons worked with a broad variety of musicians, including UFO, Waysted, Motörhead, Richard and Linda Thompson, and many others.

During the 1990s, Lyons released two albums with his band, Kick. Lyons also worked as a staff writer for Nashville publishers Hayes Street Music, moving to Nashville in 1998.

In 2003, Ten Years After reformed, and Lyons toured with the group for the next decade. In 2010, with TYA guitarist/singer Joe Gooch, he formed Hundred Seventy Split. At the end of 2013, Lyons and Gooch resigned from Ten Years After.

Lyons continued releasing albums as part of Hundred Seventy Split. The group is actively touring, and they perform TYA songs along with original material.

Lyons is married with two adult sons. As of 2019, Lyons resides in Cardiff, Wales.
