= Alvin Lee =

English singer, songwriter, and guitarist (1944–2013)

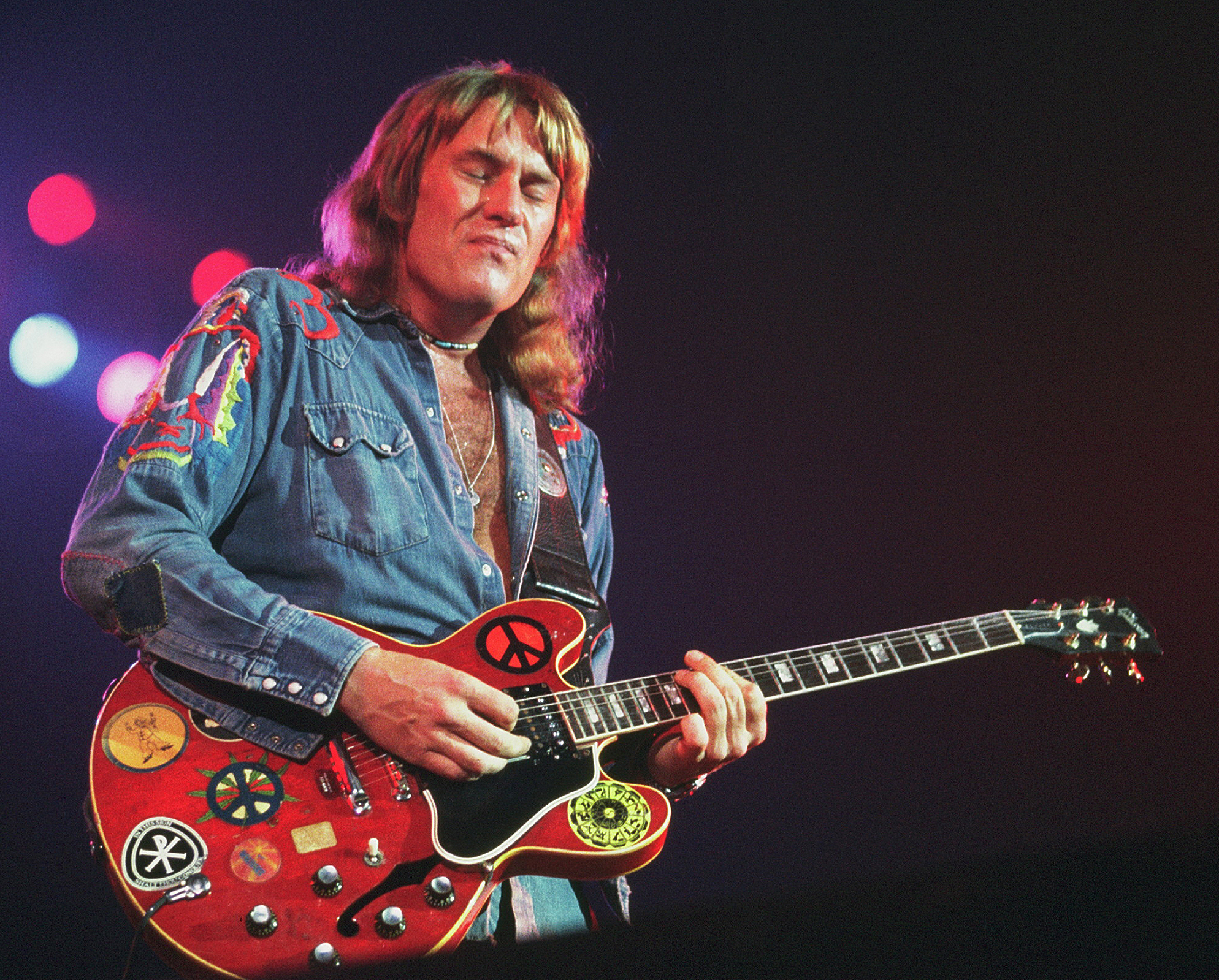
- Lee in 1975 playing his Gibson ES-335 ("Big Red")

Background information
- Born: Graham Anthony Barnes; 19 December 1944; Nottingham, Nottinghamshire, England
- Died: 6 March 2013 (aged 68) Estepona, Spain
- Genres: Blues rock; blues; rock; rockabilly
- Occupations: Musician; singer-songwriter; record producer
- Instruments: Vocals; guitar
- Years active: 1960–2013
- Labels: Decca; Deram; Columbia; Chrysalis; Polydor; RSO; Atlantic
- Formerly of: Ten Years After
- Website: alvinlee.com

Alvin Lee (born Graham Anthony Barnes; 19 December 1944 – 6 March 2013) was an English guitarist, singer and songwriter who was best known as the lead vocalist and guitarist of the blues rock band Ten Years After.

== Early life ==
Lee was born in Nottingham and attended the Margaret Glen Bott School adjacent to Wollaton Park. He began playing guitar at the age of 13. In 1960, Lee, along with bassist Leo Lyons, formed the core of the band Ten Years After. He was influenced by his parents' collection of jazz and blues records, but it was the advent of rock and roll that sparked his interest.

== Career ==
Lee's performance at the Woodstock Festival was captured on film in the documentary of the event, and his 'lightning-fast' playing helped catapult him to stardom. The film brought Lee's music to a worldwide audience, although he later lamented that he missed the lost freedom and spiritual dedication of earlier audiences.

Lee was named "the fastest guitarist in the West" and considered a precursor to shred-style playing that would develop in the 1980s.

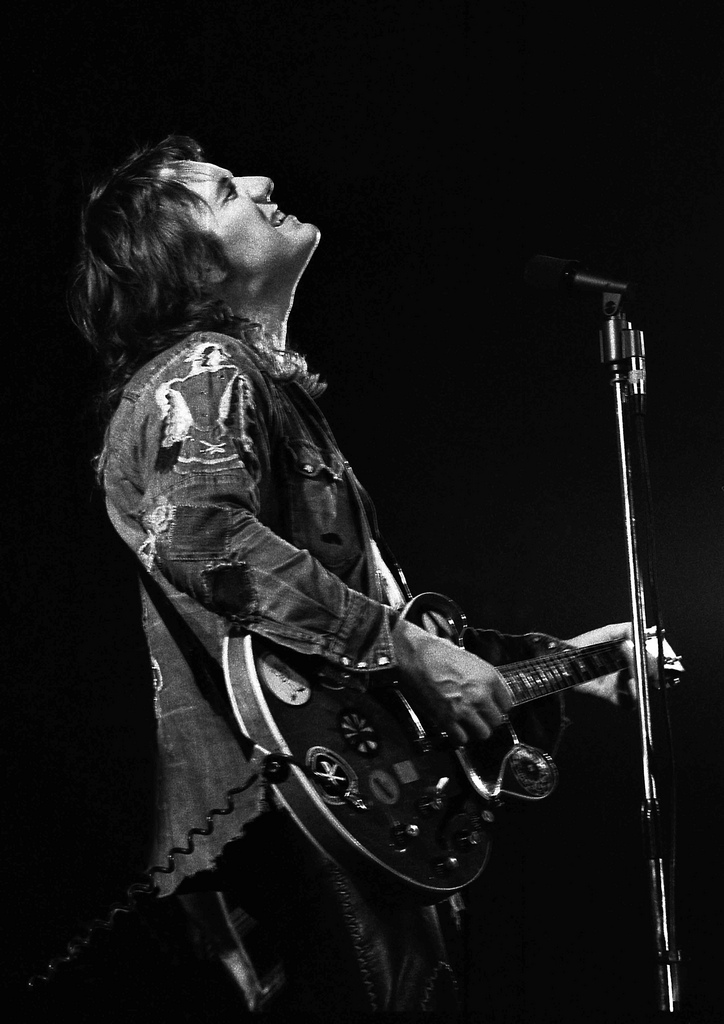
Lee performing in Breda, Turfschip, the Netherlands, 1978

Ten Years After had success, releasing ten albums together, but by 1973 Lee felt limited by the band's style. Moving to Columbia Records resulted in a radio hit song, "I'd Love to Change the World", but Lee preferred blues-rock to the pop style the label preferred. He left the group after their second Columbia LP. With American Christian rock pioneer Mylon LeFevre, along with guests George Harrison, Steve Winwood, Ronnie Wood and Mick Fleetwood, he recorded and released On the Road to Freedom, an acclaimed album that was at the forefront of country rock. Also in 1973, he sat in on the Jerry Lee Lewis double album The Session recorded in London, featuring many other guest stars including Albert Lee, Peter Frampton and Rory Gallagher. A year later, in response to a dare, Lee formed Alvin Lee & Company to play a show at the Rainbow Theatre in London and released it as a double live album, In Flight. Various members of the band continued on with Lee for his next two albums, Pump Iron! and Let It Rock. In late 1975, he played guitar for a couple of tracks on Bo Diddley's The 20th Anniversary of Rock 'n' Roll all-star album. He ended the 1970s with an outfit called Ten Years Later, with Tom Compton on drums and Mick Hawksworth on bass, which released two albums, Rocket Fuel (1978) and Ride On (1979), and toured extensively throughout Europe and the United States.

The 1980s brought another change in Lee's direction, with two albums that were collaborations with Rare Bird's Steve Gould and a tour for which the former John Mayall and Rolling Stones guitarist Mick Taylor joined his band.

Lee's overall musical output includes more than 20 albums, including 1987's Detroit Diesel, 1989's About Time (the reunion album he did with Ten Years After) recorded in Memphis with producer Terry Manning and the back to back 1990s collections of Zoom and Nineteen Ninety-Four (US title I Hear You Rockin'). Guest artists on the albums included George Harrison and Jon Lord.

In Tennessee, recorded with Scotty Moore and D. J. Fontana, was released in 2004. Saguitar was released in 2007. Lee's last album, Still on the Road to Freedom, was released in September 2012.

== Death ==
Lee died in Spain on 6 March 2013, aged 68, due to complications from surgery to correct an atrial arrhythmia. His former bandmates lamented his death. Leo Lyons called him "the closest thing I had to a brother", while Ric Lee (no relation) said, "I don't think it's even sunk in yet as to the reality of his passing". Billboard highlighted such landmark performances as "I'm Going Home" from the Woodstock festival and his 1971 hit single "I'd Love to Change the World".

== Discography ==
=== Studio albums ===
Album	US Chart	Year
Pump Iron!	131	1975
Let It Rock	-	1978
Rocket Fuel	115	1978
Ride On	158	1979
Free Fall	198	1980
RX5	-	1981
Detroit Diesel	124	1986
Zoom	-	1992
Nineteen Ninety-Four	-	1994
In Tennessee	-	2004
Saguitar	-	2007
Still on the Road to Freedom	-	2012

- Note: Ride On contains one studio side and one live side.

=== Collaborative album ===
Album	US Chart	Year	Notes
On the Road to Freedom	138	1973	with Mylon LeFevre

=== Live albums ===
Album	US Chart	Year	Notes	Chrysalis Records
In Flight	65	1974	Live at the Rainbow Theatre in 1974	
Live at Rockpalast	-	1978	Grugahalle, Essen, Germany, 15 September 1978	
Live In Vienna	-	1994	Label: International House Of Hits	
The Last Show	-	2013	May 28, 2012 - Raalte, Holland	

=== Singles ===
Single	US Rock	Year	Album
"Detroit Diesel"	26	1986	Detroit Diesel
