= An Anthology of Noise & Electronic Music =

- Cover art for the 6th anthology

Compilation album by Various Artists
- Released: 2001–2013
- Recorded: 1860–2012
- Genre: Electronic, noise, experimental
- Length: 1126:12
- Label: Sub Rosa
- Producer: Guy-Marc Hinant

An Anthology of Noise & Electronic Music is a seven album compilation of 176 tracks of historic noise music and electronic music released on 15 CDs between the years 2001 and 2011. It was curated, noted and edited by Guy-Marc Hinant.

Almost all of the CDs are out of print. The breadth of the anthology makes it comparable to Harry Everett Smith’s 1952 Anthology of American Folk Music.

== Anthology #1 ==
No.	Title	Original artist/release	Length
1.	"Corale"	Luigi Russolo & Antonio Russolo, 1921	1:57
2.	"Wochenede"	Walter Ruttmann, 1930	11:17
3.	"Cinq études de bruits: étude violette"	Pierre Schaeffer, 1948	3:18
4.	"Scambi"	Henri Pousseur, 1957	6:27
5.	"The Dresden Interleaf 13 February 1945"	Gordon Mumma, 1965	12:43
6.	"Trance #2"	Angus MacLise, Tony Conrad, & John Cale, 1965	5:07
7.	"Untitled #1"	Philip Jeck, Otomo Yoshihide, & Martin Tétreault, 2000	6:06
8.	"October 24, 1992: Graz, Austria"	Survival Research Laboratories, 1992	6:11
9.	"Ragout: Küchen Rezept von Einstürzende Neubauten"	Einstürzende Neubauten, 1998	4:08
10.	"Aspekt"	Konrad Boehmer, 1966	15:13
11.	"Hommage à John Cage"	Nam June Paik, 1958	4:13
12.	"Rozart mix"	John Cage, 1965	7:18
13.	"Audience"	Sonic Youth, 1983	6:00
14.	"Poème électronique"	Edgard Varèse, 1958	8:00
15.	"Concret PH"	Iannis Xenakis, 1958	2:44
16.	"FTP > Bundle / Conduit 23"	DJ Spooky That Subliminal Kid, 2001	8:07
17.	"A little noise in the system (Moog System)"	Pauline Oliveros, 1966	30:16
18.	"One minute"	Ryoji Ikeda, 1997	1:00

== Anthology #2 ==
No.	Title	Original artist/release	Length
1.	"Incantation for tape"	Vladimir Ussachevsky and Otto Luening, 1953	2:36
2.	"Visage V"	Luc Ferrari, 1958	10:36
3.	"Aerial > Song"	Tod Dockstader, 2002	12:56
4.	"Music of the spheres"	Johanna Beyer, 1938	6:00
5.	"Mandolin"	Morton Subotnick, 1962	7:02
6.	"Four aspects"	Daphne Oram, 1960	8:14
7.	"Emily"	Scanner, 1993	4:53
8.	"Quintet"	Hugh Davies, 1967	12:11
9.	"Space travel w/ Changing Choral Textures"	Alan R. Splet, 1980	4:04
10.	"Zephirum scan"	Kim Cascone, 2002	4:49
11.	"Bronchus one.1"	Autechre, 1991	6:04
12.	"On/Off edit"	Multiphonic Ensemble, 2001	9:10
13.	"Torture / Bodyparts"	Meira Asher + Guy Harries, 2001	3:42
14.	"Purzuit ov noize"	Choose	5:36
15.	"Pulp"	Woody McBride, 1993	6:11
16.	"Lathe"	Arcane Device, 1988	5:56
17.	"Industrial ambients"	Laibach, 1980	9:58
18.	"Slogun"	SPK, 1979	6:15
19.	"Free music #1 (for four theremins)"	Percy Grainger, 1936	1:28
20.	"Imagination"	Sun Ra and the Arkestra, 1965	2:00
21.	"She's too much for my mirror/ my human gets me Blues"	Captain Beefheart, 1969	5:21

== Anthology #3 ==
No.	Title	Original artist/release	Length
1.	"De natura sonorum: matières induites"	Bernard Parmegiani, 1975	3:44
2.	"Short presentation of the 1948 Sackbut: the Sackbut blues, followed by a noisome pestilence"	Hugh Le Caine, 1953-1958	3:25
3.	"Stereo music for Serge Modular Prototype"	Hrvatski	5:30
4.	"The last largo"	Ilhan Mimaroglu, 1989	9:33
5.	"Room Pieces: excerpt"	Michael J. Schumacher, 2003	4:41
6.	"Ovipool"	Justin Bennett, 2003	3:25
7.	"Stone: Reciprocal"	Lilith, 1992	3:30
8.	"Modular(2)-Flume"	Fred Szymanski, 2003	6:41
9.	"Untitled #148"	Francisco López, 2003	10:03
10.	"Execution of intelligence"	Zbigniew Karkowski, 2004	8:20
11.	"Birds and warhorse"	Merzbow, 2004	11:30
12.	"Requiem: Dies Irae"	Michel Chion, 1973	6:00
13.	"Sähkösoittimen Ääniä #4+#1"	Erkki Kurenniemi, 1971	5:26
14.	"Time...dot(3)"	Alva Noto, 2000	4:26
15.	"Early work 6"	Pita, 1984	3:00
16.	"Klangstudies II"	Herbert Eimert + Robert Beyer, 1952	4:43
17.	"Eve"	Günther Rabl, 1987	6:00
18.	"Teilmenge 35 C"	Asmus Tietchens, 2004	4:40
19.	"Feuerland"	Michael Rother, 1976	7:20
20.	"The Faust tapes: untitled #16+#17"	Faust, 1973	2:55
21.	"Contacte"	To Rococo Rot, 2004	4:30
22.	"Till Zakynthos (Op. 205)"	Rune Lindblad, 1988	13:39
23.	"Eternal love #3"	Phauss, 1993	13:07

== Anthology #4 ==
No.	Title	Original artist/release	Length
1.	"Wire recorder piece"	Halim El-Dabh, 1944	2:01
2.	"Pièce Électronique #3"	György Ligeti, 1958	2:15
3.	"Mutations"	Jean-Claude Risset, 1969	10:32
4.	"Demeures aquatiques"	Beatriz Ferreyra, 1967	7:20
5.	"Vox"	Maja Ratkje, 2005	13:23
6.	"Sediment"	Laurie Spiegel, 1972	9:16
7.	"Pendulum music"	Steve Reich, 1968	7:27
8.	"Marfa mix"	Stephen Vitiello, 2003	4:15
9.	"Ressac"	eRikm, 2003	4:41
10.	"Sea-Food"	Wang Changcun, 2005	4:49
11.	"Unyoga"	Chlorgeschlecht, 2003	2:40
12.	"Funktion grau"	Gottfried Michael Koenig, 1969	10:15
13.	"Broken music composition"	Milan Knížák, 1979	3:28
14.	"Fucked up and naked"	Les Rallizes Dénudés, 1977	8:33
15.	"Weaving the magic"	Vibracathedral Orchestra, 2003	4:45
16.	"River Blindness"	Andy Hawkins, 1995	10:11
17.	"Still And Moving Lines Of Silence In Families Of Hyperbolas: Voice"	Alvin Lucier, 1974	11:39
18.	"Circa 1901"	The Loop Orchestra, 2005	8:00
19.	"Still warm"	John Watermann, 1989	3:00
20.	"It"	François Bayle + Robert Wyatt + Kevin Ayers, 1968	3:41
21.	"Present time exercises"	William S. Burroughs, 1971	2:23
22.	"Air attack over Kabul airfield"	James Whitehead, 2005	4:14
23.	"Simultanéité aérienne"	Vivenza, 1994	8:52
24.	"Oraison"	Olivier Messiaen, 1937	7:42

== Anthology #5 ==
- Rogelio Sosa Vinylika 7:02
- Christian Galaretta Marañon (Part VI) 10:25
- Dickson Dee Shame (Tetsuo Furudate sound materials remix) 4:58
- François-Bernard Mâche Prélude 5:30
- Richard Maxfield Pastoral symphony 4:02
- Wolf Vostell Elektronicher dé-collage. Happening raum 2:59
- Charlemagne Palestine Seven organism study 7:53
- André Boucourechliev Texte 2 4:36
- Helmut Lachenmann Scenario 12:30
- Alireza Mashayekhi Shur, op.15 6:29
- Claude Ballif Points, mouvements 10:14
- Mauricio Kagel Antithèse 9:21
- Vladimir Mayakovsky And Would You? 0:33
- Raoul Hausmann Fmsbw 0:46
- Gil Joseph Wolman Mégapneumies (24 Mars 1963) 4:55
- Léo Kupper Electro-Poème 5:55
- Josef Anton Riedl Leonce Und Lena 2:18
- Sten Hanson + Henri Chopin Tête À Tête 5:08
- Dajuin Yao Satisfaction of oscillation 9:27
- Pere Ubu Sentimental Journey 7:02
- Ground Zero Live 1992 0:59
- Masonna Spectrum ripper 3:33
- Sutcliffe Jugend Blind ignorance 5:40
- Club Moral L'enfer est intime 6:33
- Dub Taylor Lumière (part I) 17:12

== Anthology #6 ==
- Israël Martinez Mi Vida (2007) 06:59
- Sote Turquoise gas in Ice (2008) 03:36
- Joseph Nechvatal Ego Masher (1983) 07:05
- Oliver Stummer + Liesl Ujvary Trautorium Jetztzeit #4 (1930 sound) 03:44
- Henry Cowell The Banshee (1925-57) 02:23
- Dick Raaymakers Piano-forte (1959-60) 04:55
- Manuel Rocha Iturbide Estudio Antimatierico N°1 (1989) 05:02
- Tetsuo Furudate You Are the Man Who Crucified Him (2008) 06:26
- Pain Jerk Aufheben (1993) 06:28
- Hijokaidan Untitled (Unreleased Studio Outtake, Recorded On 24Th, Oct. 1994) (1994) 11:54
- Incapacitants Shall We Die? (1990) 06:25
- Torturing Nurse Yes or No (2010) 04:49
- Sachiko M 28082000 (2000) 05:32
- Ultraphonist How to practice scales (2000) 03:07
- Z'EV 12 November 1980, Melkweg, Amsterdam (1980) 07:31
- Daniel Menche Fulmination (2009) 12:00
- John Wiese New Wave Dust (2004) 02:25
- The Pain Barrier Virus (2003) 05:29
- Julie Rousse Flesh Barbie Techno Fuck (2008) 04:45
- Bird Palace + Pablo Palacio Phing (2009) 04:23
- Robert Piotrowicz Lincoln Sea Ice Walic (2009) 08:09
- Tzvi Avni Vocalise (1964) 05:18
- Else Marie Pade Syv Cirkler (1958) 07:05
- John Duncan The Nazca Transmissions #2 (2005) 08:10
- Stephen O'Malley Dolmens & Lighthouses (2009) 06:53
- Ilios The continuum of emanation from the One (2009) 06:06

== Anthology #7 ==
- Henry Jacobs Sonata for Loudspeakers (1953-4) 9'20
- Dziga Vertov Radio-ear (Radio Pravda) (1930) 2'58
- Bebe and Louis Barron Bells of Atlantis (1952) 9'00
- Luciano Berio Thema (Omaggio a Joyce) (1958) 6'12
- Bülent Arel Electronic Music (1961) 8'37
- Don Preston Analog Heaven #6 (1975) 3'04
- Slawek Kwi + Siobhán McDonald Lava Samples 2'03
- Benjamin Thigpen Thread0 (2011) 5'24
- Helmut Schäfer Infuse (2005-6) 7'36
- Novi_sad The insolence of a poppy (2011) 13'23
- SAULE Paperfilm (2002) 11'22
- Édouard-Léon Scott de Martinville Au clair de la lune (1860) 0'16
- John Oswald Vertical Time 9'58
- Israel Quellet Pour percussion et saturation (2007) 2'21
- Sin:Net Decomposition 5'03
- Anla Courtis Mind Broncoespasmo 2'36
- Fausto Romitelli Trash TV Trance (2002) 10'10
- Justin K. Broadrick Guitar Three (1995) 10'21
- Storm Bugs Cash Wash/Eat good Beans (1980) 3'41
- E.A.R. Beyond the Pale (1992) 14'49
- Henry Cow From Trondheim (1976) 13'06
- Osso Exótico Rota de inverno (1994) 4'45
- Eugeniusz Rudnik Collage (1965) 4'59
- Eduardo Polonio Transparencias (2011) 7'07
- Cabaret Voltaire Chance versus Causuality (1979) 5'47
- Mika Vainio Transformer in 7 (2011) 5'59
- Alma Laprida + Juan Jose Calarco Contorso (2011) 2'36
- Klangkrieg Korpus 1 (1996) 3'37
- Gintas K 4m (2011) 7'19
- Warong Rachapreecha Shambles (2012) 0'56
- The New Blockaders Blockade is Resistance (1983) 8'12
- GX Jupitter-Larsen / The Haters Fuechen (1985) 5'20
- The Rita Skate (2009) 4'59
- To Die Terhempas luka / Jurang nestapa (2011) 1'03
- Agro Only Those Who Attempt the Impossible Will Achieve the Absurd (1995) 4'08
- Jamka Wild Rosa Tree (2010) 5'48
- Erin Sexton Suspend / 2 Electromagnetic Amplifiers (2011) 4:52
- Gustavo Serpa Astro Metal (2008) 6'04
- A. Nonymous Untitled (unknown) 0'23

== See also ==
- List of record labels
