= Live at the Fillmore East 1970 =

Live album by Ten Years After
- Released: 2001
- Recorded: February 27–28, 1970
- Venue: Fillmore East, New York City
- Genre: Blues-rock, rock & roll
- Length: 114:30
- Label: Capitol
- Producer: Ten Years After

Professional ratings
Review scores
Source	Rating
Allmusic	4/5 stars

Live at the Fillmore East 1970, is the fourth live album by Ten Years After recorded in February 1970. This double-disc album features many rock and blues covers, such as Chuck Berry's "Sweet Little Sixteen", and "Roll Over Beethoven" and also Willie Dixon's "Spoonful", which was also covered by Cream on their albums Fresh Cream and Wheels of Fire. Unlike Ten Years After studio album A Space In Time - which was released next year, in 1971 - Live at the Fillmore East does not have as much of a pop sound, but more of a 1950s blues sound.

== Track listing ==
=== Disc One ===
No.	Title	Writer(s)	Original album	Length
1.	"Love Like a Man"	Alvin Lee	Cricklewood Green (1970)	9:34
2.	"Good Morning Little Schoolgirl"	Sonny Boy Williamson	Ssssh (1969)	7:26
3.	"Working On The Road"	Alvin Lee	Cricklewood Green (1970)	3:34
4.	"The Hobbit"	Ric Lee		10:52
5.	"50,000 Miles Beneath My Brain"	Alvin Lee	Cricklewood Green (1970)	9:58
6.	"Skoobly-Oobley-Doobob / I Can't Keep From Crying Sometimes / Extension On One Chord"	Alvin Lee / Al Kooper / A. Lee, R. Lee, L. Lyons, M.G. Churchill	Stonedhenge (1969) / Ten Years After (1967)	19:30

=== Disc Two ===
No.	Title	Writer(s)	Original album	Length
1.	"Help Me"	Sonny Boy Williamson II, Willie Dixon, Ralph Bass	Ten Years After (1967)	16:05
2.	"I'm Going Home"	Alvin Lee	Undead (1968)	11:57
3.	"Sweet Little Sixteen"	Chuck Berry	Watt (1970)	4:38
4.	"Roll Over Beethoven"	Chuck Berry		4:44
5.	"I Woke Up This Morning"	Alvin Lee	Ssssh (1969)	8:09
6.	"Spoonful"	Willie Dixon	Ten Years After (1967)	8:00

== Personnel ==
Ten Years After

- Alvin Lee - guitar, vocals
- Chick Churchill - organ
- Leo Lyons - bass
- Ric Lee - drums
