= Mike Falana =

Nigerian trumpeter (fl. 1960s)

- Also known as: Mike Felana, Mike Fellana, Mike Falani
- Origin: Lagos, Nigeria
- Genres: Jazz
- Occupation: Musician
- Instrument: Trumpet
- Formerly of: NBC Dance Orchestra, The African Messengers, The Johnny Burch Octet, The Graham Bond Organization, The Ramong Sound, Chicago Line, Peter King ensemble

Mike Falana (died c. 1995) was a Nigerian jazz trumpeter and musician of the highlife genre. He was a member of several groups in the 1960s that included well-known musicians, such as the African Messengers, the Johnny Burch Octet, the Graham Bond Organization and the Ramong Sound. He achieved a level of stardom in the early 1960s.

== Background ==
According to the book Kay Thompson from Funny Face to Eloise by Sam Irvin, Mike Falana was a thirteen year old prodigy who could play like Miles Davis. It was then that he was discovered by Lionel Hampton who was over in Lagos on a cultural arts exchange.

In the 1950s, Falana was a soloist with the Nigerian Broadcasting Corporation (NBC) Dance Orchestra which had Fela Sowande and Steve Rhodes as the musical directors on various occasions.

He was a member of the African Messengers who also had Bayo Martins, Peter King, Humphrey Okoh and Paul Edoh in the line up. The group had a hit with "Highlife Piccadilly" and in 1964, they were winners at the World International Jazz Contest in Switzerland. In addition to appearing at clubs and festivals, the ensemble had provided backing for The Four Tops, The Temptations and Diana Ross.

Falana, credited as Mike Fellana was a member of the group Chicago Line aka Chicago Line Blues Band who released the single "Shimmy Shimmy Ko-Ko Bop" / "Jump Back" in 1966. The line up included Louis Cennamo, Mike Patto, Tim Hinkley, Viv Prince and Falana.

He was the fourth member of the Graham Bond Organisation, replacing Jack Bruce. He was described by Dick Heckstall-Smith as a "diminutive well-dressed Nigerian from a rich Lagos family" and one "who had a wonderful attitude to Britain in its seamier aspects". Heckstall-Smith also said he was a "wonderful trumpet player".

In later years Falana as well as Nigerian Jazz singer, Maud Meyer received posthumous awards for their jazz contributions.

Falana was one of the well-known African musicians who headed towards Europe to further their careers.

== Career ==
=== 1960s ===
1960 to 1962

Mike Falana appeared at the AMSAC organized festival in December 1961 which was held in Lagos, Nigeria. US-artists such as Nina Simone, Odetta, Randy Weston, Michael Olatunji, Langston Hughes, and Lionel Hampton were part of it. Falana was incorrectly billed as Mike Falani. Along with fellow Nigerian musicians; saxophonist Bobby Benson, trumpeters Zeal Onyia and Chief Bill Friday, Falana played with closing act Lionel Hampton on his signature tune, "Flying Home". Unfortunately for Hampton the tune didn't go down well with the audience as did the rest of his appearance.

In 1962 Falana arrived in London and started work straight away. He was working as part of the house band at The Establishment which was co-owned by Peter Cook.

1963

Now as part of the UK group the Johnny Burch Octet, Falana participated in a live broadcast for the BBC which was recorded in March 1963. The musical selections performed by the ensemble included "Moanin’", " Early In the Morning", "All Members", " I Remember Clifford", "Going Up North", "Nightwalk" and "Del Sasser".

While with the Octet, Mike Falana was at a reception at the Mayfair Hotel. While there he was photographed by Val Wilmer . The photograph had him with Sammy Davis, Jnr. and Davis' MD George Rhodes. The photo and caption appeared in the May 1963 edition of Crescendo magazine.

In early August 1963, Falana, billed a solo act was appearing at the Klooks Kleek on the same night as Brian Auger and the Trinity and the Tony Baylis Quartet. And on Thursday he was the featured musician with the John Williams Big Band at the Acton in High Street. On Saturday August 3rd he was appearing at the Marquee as the featured artist with the Joe Harriott Quintet, and on Sunday August 4th he was appearing at the same venue as the featured artist with the John Williams Big Band. Also that month Falana was the star soloist with the John Williams Big Band at the National Jazz Festival in Richmond. The review of the band's appearance was by Crescendo. The reviewer made a comment about Falana's phrasing being in the Miles Davis vein.

1964

Falana came no. 3 in the British section, New Star section of the 1964 Melody Maker Readers Jazz Poll.

Falana was a member of the African Messengers. He co-led with alto-saxophonist Peter King on the group's recordings. In mid-May, they appeared at the Marquee, playing to an audience of more than six hundred. At the time the line-up included Humphrey Akoh on alto sax, Peter King on tenor sax, Falana on trumpet, Happy Williams on electric bass, Dick Rushton on piano, Paul Edoh on congas, and James Meane on drums. Vocalist Mel Turner performed with them and one song they did, "Work Song" managed to get an enthusiastic participation from the audience. That year the group had their first single "Highlife Piccadilly" bw "Blues For Messengers" released on the Carnival label..

According to Melody Maker in the magazine's May 30 issue, Falana (spelt Mike Fellana), Mose Allison, the Jazz Crusaders, Chris Barber, the Staples Singers and The Yardbirds had been invited to the International Jazz Days festival.

Also that year, an episode (one of the earliest) of London Line featured Nigerian parish priest, the Reverend Ogundura in the UK and a music item by Falana and the African Messengers.

1965 to 1969

In 1966 and as a member of Graham Bond Organisation, he played at the Ram Jam Club on June 30, and the Farnborough College of Technology on July 2, the Corn Exchange on July 26, the Manor House on July 29, the Atalanta ballroom on August 1 and various other venues.

For a period of time he was in The Ramong Sound, a group fronted by Raymond Morrison and Clem Curtis. When Morrison was forced to depart due to legal matters, Arthur Brown came in for a brief spell. It would eventually evolve into The Foundations. By the time the group had a hit with "Baby, Now That I've Found You", Falana and Brown etc. were no longer in the group.

=== 1970s ===
Falana played on Peter King's Shango album which was recorded in 1974. The other musicians were Humphrey Okoh on alto sax, David Williams on bass, Paul Edoh on congas, James Menin on drums, Arthur Simon on guitar, and Peter King on sax and flute. The album remained unreleased for decades.

== Later years ==
In July, 2013 All About Jazz published their review the Wade in the Water: Classics, Origins and Oddities by The Graham Bond Organization. Falana's solo work on "St. James Infirmary" was mentioned with reviewer Duncan Heining referring to it as a "beautifully nuanced version". Falana's played on about twenty of the tracks.

An article about Mike Falana by Val Wilmer appeared in the June 2019 issue of The Wire.

== Death ==
According to jazz musician and historian Anote Ajeluorou, Mike Falana had health issues and died abroad. It is believed that he died in 1995.
