= The Ramong Sound =

UK musical group

- Origin: London, England
- Genres: Soul; ska; R&B
- Years active: c 1966 - 1967
- Spinoffs: The Foundations
- Past members: Raymond Morrison; Clem Curtis; Arthur Brown; Alan Warner; Peter Macbeth; Lyndsay Arnold; Con (Surname unknown); Mike Falana

The Ramong Sound was a British R&B, soul and ska band, active from 1965 to 1966.

== Background ==
The Ramong Sound was a London-based outfit, that featured two black lead singers doing Sam & Dave styled duets, one of them being Raymond Morrison (aka Ramong Morrison), and the other being a former professional boxer, Clem Curtis who had also done some wrestling.

Morrison had left Jamaica and arrived in London in 1954. During his time, Morrison (also known as Ray Morrison) had worked with Trev Thoms. He had also fronted or sung with The Graham Bond Organisation for a brief period.

Nigerian born Mike Falana was a member for a period of time and had been a star in his own right. He had been a member of the African Messengers, The Johnny Burch Octet, the Graham Bond Organisation, having replaced Jack Bruce.

Prior to joining the Ramong Sound, 25 year-old Clem Curtis was a professional boxer and had worked as a painter and interior decorator.

Guitar player Alan Warner was an experienced musician, and joined the Ramong Sound after having worked in various bands. He would stay with the group through all of their name change evolutions from Ramongs to Foundations, until he left the Foundations in 1970 to join progressive rock band Pluto.

At some stage, the group was called The Ramongs, or The Ramong. It may be that the last title in the succession of name changes was The Ramong Sound as the name was being used in early 1967.

At one point, the group had been discovered by Ron Fairway. In August 2023, Alan Warner was interviewed by Jack Hodgins of the Australian radio station, 2NUR FM. The interview appears to suggest that Raymond Morrison was still in the group when Ron Fairway approached them.

== History and career ==
Group leader Ramong (Raymond Morrison) was looking for backing singers. Clem Curtis's uncle told him about it, and he should give it a try. At this time Curtis' singing experience was more or less limited to singing with his uncle when he came around the house with the guitar. So, Curtis went along and joined up. He joined The Ramong Sound as a backing singer. He later was sharing the lead with Raymond Morrison. The group had a steadily growing reputation and following around the London club scene due to their energetic performances. Morrison and Curtis performed duets. Even though Curtis lacked the experience, he was able to work on his style then.

It appears that the original lead singer, Ramong Morrison (Raymond Morrison), whom the group was named after, was imprisoned for six months in January 1967 for assault, the group attempted to recruit Rod Stewart, but Stewart had other plans. Later, a friend of the band called Joan suggested Arthur Brown as a replacement. When Brown walked in for his rehearsal at the Westbourne Grove bar, he saw the drummer was bent backwards over the bar with Clem leaning over him with a spear at his throat. Contrary to his wild image he had with The Crazy World of Arthur Brown, he was very straight when he joined the band and he didn't drink, smoke or take drugs. While with the group, Brown and Curtis would do songs separately as well as together in Duets. They were covering mainly soul music material. Years later in an interview Brown stated that he was "chuffed" to be singing with Curtis. Incidentally Brown already had his Crazy World band up and running at the same time. Around this time they had gone through a succession of name changes that included The Foundation Sound, The Foundation Squad, and would eventually evolve into The Foundations. Arthur Brown would leave the band after a couple of months. He may have left in June that year.

The group emerged in early 1967 with a new horn section consisting of Dominican trombonist Eric Allandale and Jamaican saxophonists Pat Burke and Mike Elliott filling roles once held by Mike Falana and the other horn player(s). Drummer Tim Harris filled the position once held by Lyndsay Arnold, and Clem Curtis was now the lead singer.

The group had been living in a former gambling den called The Butterfly Club which they ended up running. They were eventually forced out by a protection racket gang and had to move next door into what was described as a squalid disused mini-cab office.

The 4 February 1967 issue of Melody Maker shows a booking for The Ramong Sound (misspelt as The Ramog Sound) at the All-Star Club at 9a Artillery Passage, London E1 on Sunday, 5 February 1967.

At some stage the group was discovered by Ron Fairway who introduced them to Barry Class.

The Foundations would go on to have several hits, including "Baby Now That I've Found You" with Clem Curtis on lead vocals and later with Colin Young on "Build Me Up Buttercup".

== Later years ==
=== Raymond Morrison ===
Having completed his six-month prison sentence, Morrison took legal action against The Foundations. As reported in the 27 July 1968 issue of Melody Maker, Morrison took it to court in a bid to put a freeze on a proportion of the group's earnings. Morrison claimed that he had discovered the talent of the group. But with his association to the group having been severed by his imprisonment etc., the Judge who heard the case, Judge Stamp said that he couldn't understand how he could have any share or interest in a song ("Baby Now That I've Found You") that came into existence after he had severed his connection with the group.

Raymond Morrison would record a single "Girl I Want to Hold You" backed with "Money Can't Buy Life", released on the Sugar label in January, 1970. It had a short review by Chris Welch of Melody Maker. Noting Morrison's distinctive vocals and the bright backing beat, he referred to it as A sort of bluebeat come reggae come throat pastille boogaloo.

==== Hawk & Hyfan Records ====
Later in the late 1970s, Morrison founded his record label, Hawk Records located at 243 Finchley Road, London NW3. He ran it with his wife Tamara. A co-director was Carl Lewis. In a duo with Tam (Tamara) called Ram & Tam, he recorded a succession of singles in the late 1970s for the Hawk and Hyfan labels. One of their singles, "Hawk in Flight" (Part 1) was the Cup Winner in Kelly Pike's Saturday Afternoon Fever review in the 24 June 1978 issue of Record Mirror. Pike said it was well-worth a listen, and mentioned the great backing track and the occasional Althea & Donna-type vocals drifting over it. Another single, "Will You Love Me Tomorrow", released on Hawk HSP in 1979, got onto the reggae chart for a few weeks, and by 15 December that year, it was at no. 25. When their record was charting, the Duo had been appearing every Friday and Saturday at the Black-owned Ramaras Club & Restaurant, a venue known for featuring reggae music. By 1981, the duo had expanded into a trio called Ram Tam & jo. They had a 12" single "Cherries" released on Hawk HSP 9. Ram & Tam also released an album Love & Life in 1986.

The Ramong name would be used for "Reggae's Back in Town", an Owen Grey release on the Hyfan label. The record was produced by Ramong and Totoman.

=== Clem Curtis ===
Clem Curtis quit the Foundations around September 1968 to embark on a solo career. In 1969, Curtis was in the US and was involved with Cowsills Productions, which was connected to the group The Cowsills. He had signed to Liberty Records with a single "Marie Take A Chance" in the pipeline. He recorded a succession of singles for various labels throughout the 70s, and along the way having a disco hit in 1975 with "Unchained Melody" and "On Broadway". He carried on with releases into the 2000s with the last being Lord Large Feat. Clem Curtis, "Stuck in a Wind Up" / "Move Over Daddy". He had also been at the helm of various lineups of The Foundations over the years.

== Deaths of members ==
According to jazz musician and historian Anote Ajeluorou, Mike Falana had health issues and died abroad, and according to an article on the Otherweis... website, he died in 1995.

Raymond Morrison died at age 81 in Jamaica in February 2013.

Clem Curtis died aged 76 in March 2017.

== Former personnel ==
Personnel
Name	Role	Notes
Raymond Morrison aka Ramong Morrison	lead vocals	
Clem Curtis	lead vocals	
Arthur Brown	lead vocals	
Alan Warner	guitar, backing vocals	
Peter McBeth	bass guitar	
Con	keyboards	
Lyndsay Arnold	drums	
Mike Falana	trumpet	
Unknown	other horns	

- Note In an interview with Sandy Kaye on her "Sandy Kaye Presents - A Breath of Fresh Air" episode dated 25 October 2023, Allan Warner said that the Ramong Sound had an Australian guy on drums and a South African guy on keyboards.
