= Ashley Kozak =

British jazz bassist, record producer and manager (c.1930–2008)

Ashley Kozak (c.1930 – 2008) was a British jazz bassist, record producer and artists' manager, best known as having been Donovan's manager alongside Grahame Corbyn.

== Career ==
=== 1950s ===
After working and recording with Tony Crombie and his orchestra in 1954, together with leading UK-based jazz musicians such as Crombie, Dizzy Reece, Joe Temperley and Harry South, Kozak went on to join the Vic Ash Quartet, which recorded with Maxine Sullivan. He later joined the Don Rendell Sextet (1954–55) and The Ivor and Basil Kirchin Band (1955–56), together with Stan Tracey, and was later with the Basil Kirchin Small Band. He recorded again with Tony Crombie in 1957 for the 10" Long Player, 'Rockin' with the Rockets', (Columbia Records (UK:33S1108), with Red Mitchell on bass.

=== 1960s - 1970s ===
By 1962, he was leading his own quartet, which included Harry South and Dick Morrissey, and spent several months in India.

Shortly after their return to the UK, Kozak started working as an executive at Brian Epstein's NEMS Enterprises, as well as managing artists such as Shawn Phillips (1965–67), Donovan (1965–May 1968), and the duo Michael-Claire (1968).

He produced Marc Brierley's second album for CBS Records, Hello (1969), the band Clear Blue Sky (1970–71), and put together the band Tranquility, who were described as a "hybrid of pop, rock and English folk music", and were active from 1971 to 1974.

== Record label ==
Sugar was a company run by directors Kozak and Mike Collier. Charles Ross was the production director. The 31 May 1969 issue of Record World wrote that the UK distribution of Sugar was to be handled by Pye. Bell Records was taking care of the distribution and for the United States and Canada. And a deal for that involving Larry Uttal of Bell had just been completed. Artists that recorded for the label included Claude Sang, Joe White, Frenz, Raymond Morrison. and Three Coins.

== Death ==
Kozak died in 2008.

== Discography ==
- 1954: Maxine Sullivan, voc; acc. by Vic Ash Quartet: Vic Ash, cl; Ralph Dollimore, p; Ashley Kozak, b; Ralph Green, d - London
- 1955: Meet Don Rendell - Don Rendell
- 1957: Rockin' with The Rockets - Tony Crombie and His Rockets (Red Morris, Jimmy Currie, Ashley Kozak, Red Mitchell, Clyde Ray) - Columbia 33S 1108
