= Hugh Davies =

Hugh or Huw Davies may refer to:

- Hugh Davies (botanist) (1739–1821), Welsh botanist and clergyman
- Hugh Emyr Davies (1878–1950), Welsh Presbyterian minister
- Hugh Morriston Davies (1879–1965), Welsh surgeon
- Hugh Sykes Davies (1909–1984), English poet and novelist
- Hugh Davies (cricketer) (1932–2017), Welsh cricketer
- Hugh Davies (composer) (1943–2005), musicologist, composer, and inventor
- Huw Llywelyn Davies (born 1945), Welsh broadcaster and rugby union commentator
- Huw Davies (rugby union) (born 1959), English rugby union player
- Hugh Davies (artist) (born 1971), Australian media arts practitioner, researcher and educator
- Huw Davies (chemist), British chemist
- Huw Davies (actor), Welsh actor, in The Worst Journey in the World
- Hugh Davies (MP for Radnor), represented Radnor
- Huge Davies (real name Hugh Davies), Welsh comedian
- Hugh Davies (footballer) (born 2004), Australian rules footballer
