= Roy Chicago =

Nigerian musician and bandleader

John Akintola (Yoruba pronunciation: [d͡ʒɔn ákĩ́tólá]; died February 5, 1989), also known as Roy Chicago, was a Nigerian musician and bandleader. Most popular during the 1960s, he played in the highlife style and is credited for introducing the talking drum to the genre.

== Life and career ==
Roy Chicago was born in Ikare-Akoko in the Ondo State in Nigeria. He lived in the capital city of Ondo State until he moved to Ibadan in the late 1950s. Unlike his contemporary Victor Olaiya, who was popular for music based on Ghanaian melodies and progressions, Chicago's inspirations were Nigerian indigenous themes and folklore.

In the 1950s, he began playing the saxophone in concerts at the Central Hotel in Ibadan as a member of Bobby Benson's band, at one point, becoming its leader. Roy Chicago became increasingly successful with hits such as "Iyawo Pankeke", "Are owo niesa Yoyo gbe", and "Keregbe emu".

In the 1960s, Victor Olaiya's International All Stars and Roy Chicago's Abalabi Rhythm Dandies were two of the top leading highlife bands in Nigeria, both led by graduates of the Bobby Benson Orchestra. Chicago became well known at the Abalabi Hotel in Mushin, introducing the talking drum into the highlife genre. As the Nigerian Civil War (1967–1970) progressed, highlife became less popular since many of the top highlife bands were run by the Igbo people from the breakaway regions of eastern Nigeria. The result was an increase in popularity of the easy-going and less rigid Yoruba-derived jùjú music. Chicago reached the height of his popularity during this time.

At a low point in Chicago's career in the 1970s, Bobby Benson assisted him by providing musical equipment and giving him a place to stay in Surulere.

== Music ==
Roy Chicago's music combined trumpet and saxophone playing with vocals. Alongside Bobby Benson in the 1950s, he performed highlife, along with ballroom dance, foxtrot, tango, waltz, quickstep, and jive.. His sidemen included tenor saxophonist Etim Udo and trumpeter Marco Bazz.

Chicago's highlife style anchored its accent on rhythm. He explained Nigerian folksongs through vocals accompanied by Tunde Osofisan, one of the most popular singers in the highlife scene.

Although his style was not derivative of jazz, his music contains blue notes in his saxophone parts and "cool" jazz intonations and phrases, which are closer to traditional Yoruba music than to highlife.

== Legacy ==
Former members of his band included trumpeter and vocalist Cardinal Rex Jim Lawson, who was of mixed Igbo and Kalabari background. Lawson also apprenticed with Bobby Benson and Victor Olaiya before his solo career. Jimi Solanke, the playwright, poet, and folk singer, was another singer associated with his band.

The band's recording of his composition "Onile-Gogoro" has been regarded by many as one of the most memorable highlife hits of the 1960s.

Alaba Pedro, a guitarist from Chicago's band, went on to play with Orlando Julius Aremu Olusanya Ekemode. Alaba Pedro joined Chicago in 1961 and stayed with the band until the time of the Nigerian Civil War, when it disbanded in 1969. He recalls that "It was a highly disciplined band ... The band was versatile and could play almost all types of music, but ... highlife [was] its specialty, which relied more on Nigerian melodies with rhythms rooted in indigenous elements." Peter King, one of Nigeria's most famous tenor saxophonists, began his career with Chicago's band in Lagos before going to England to study music.
