= Dominique Goblet =

Belgian cartoonist (b. 1967)

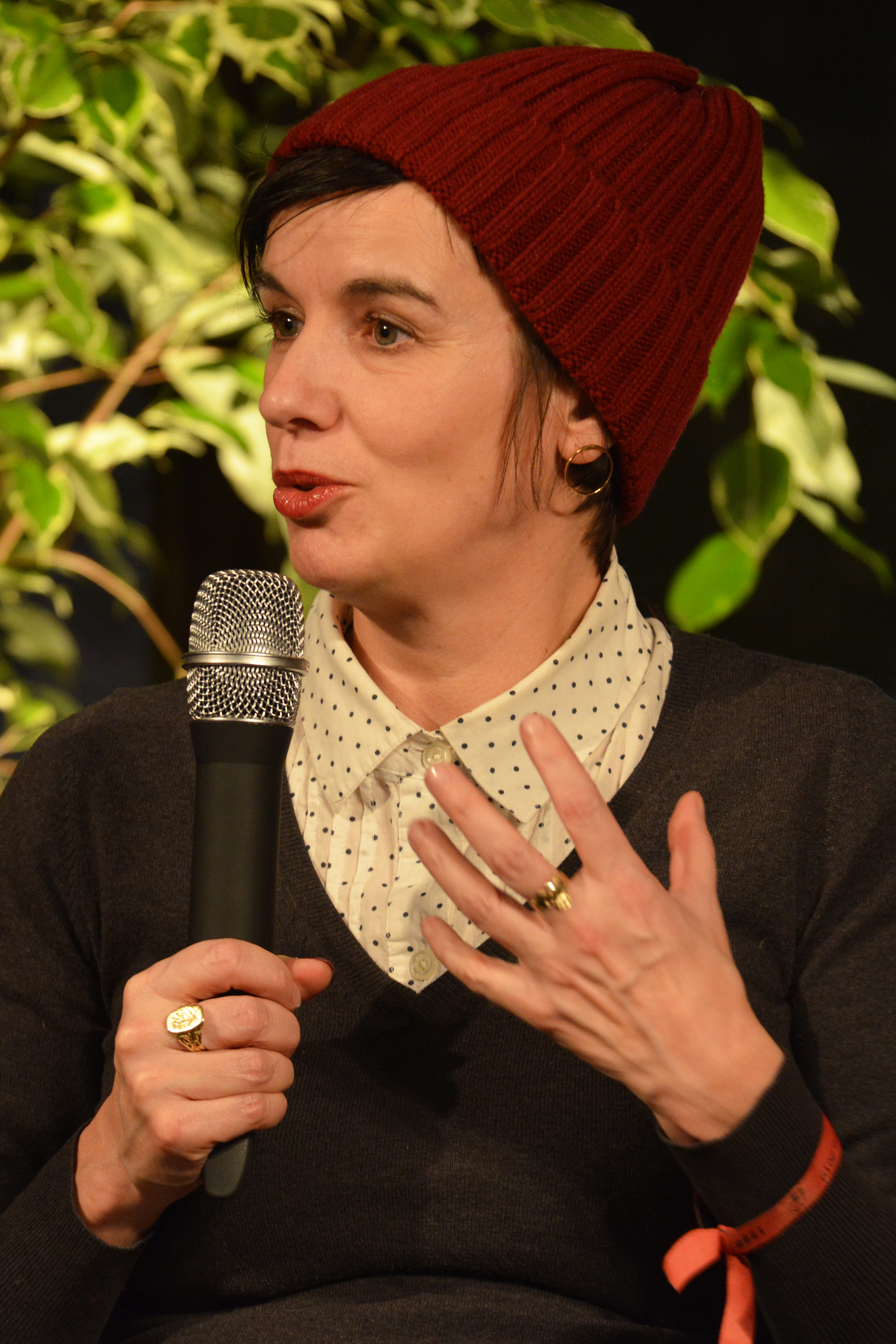
Dominique Goblet at the Angoulême International Comics Festival 2019.

Dominique Goblet (Brussels, 8 July 1967) is a Belgian visual artist, illustrator and pioneer of the European graphic novel. She lives and works in Brussels.

Her work can be defined as experimental, varied in style, poetic and often biographical.

== Biography ==
Goblet studied visual arts at l'Institut Saint-Luc and a course in illustration from 1987 to 1990. She acquired teaching qualifications in English and the arts between 2001 and 2003.

Goblet was raised in a bilingual family. Her French-speaking father Jean Lieve Goblet was a fireman and died in 1998; her mother was Flemish. Her lover Guy-Marc Hinant occasionally attributes texts to her work.

Her debut Portraits Crachés (1997) is a compilation of stories and illustrations that appeared earlier in Frigorevue magazine. In Souvenir d'une journée parfaite (2001) the fictional character Mathias Khan forms the link between a young woman and her dead father. The book originated from a workshop entitled Récits de villes by Frigobox magazine. More than ten years of preparation went into creating Faire semblant c'est mentir (2007). The story brings together two autobiographical elements: youth experiences with alcoholism and child abuse and a lover plagued by the memory of a previous relationship. Fear and competition are the dark themes of the Les Hommes Loups. Chronographie (2010) bundles together portraits of Goblet and her daughter Nikita (born in 1990) made of each other in the course of ten years. The female protagonist of Plus si entente (2014) searches on dating sites for men who can lend a hand around the house and in the garden. Goblet's books have been translated into Dutch, English, German and Norwegian.

Alongside graphic novels Goblet publishes short stories in various magazines and her work appears in compilations. For instance she took part in "Comix 2000", a one-off 2000 pages long compilation of wordless drawn stories by more than three hundred artists published in 1999 by L'Association at the occasion of the new millennium.

In September 2015 an exhibition of drawings from the latest book Plus si entente by herself and the Berlin artist Kai Pfeiffer at the Nabokov Museum in St. Petersburg was initially censored and shortly after dismantled by order of the University of St. Petersburg.

== Bibliography ==
Graphic novels (French language)

- 1997 - Portraits Crachés (Fréon, ISBN 2-930-204-10-9)
- 2001 - Souvenir d'une journée parfaite (Fréon, ISBN 2-930-204-35-4)
- 2007 - Pastrami (L'Association, ISBN 978-2-84414-250-4) (a travel diary on New York, Mexico, Guatemala and Belize)
- 2007 - Faire semblant c'est mentir (L'Association, ISBN 978-2-84414-233-7)
- 2010 - Les Hommes Loups (FRMK, ISBN 978-2-35065-032-6)
- 2010 - Chronographie (co-author Nikita Fossoul) (L'Association, ISBN 978-2-84414-387-7)
- 2014 - Plus si entente (co-author Kai Pfeiffer) (Actes Sud BD, ISBN 978-2-330-03051-3)

Collective publications (various authors)

- 1999 - 'National Geographic' (co-author Guy-Marc Hinant) in: Jean-Christophe Menu ed., Comix 2000 (L'Association, ISBN 2-84414-022-X), 604-610.
- 2000 - L'Association au Mexique (L'Association, ISBN 2-84414-034-3)
- 2005- 'Et qui a mangé le cafard?' in: M le Menu (L'Association)
- 2009 - Match de catch à Vielsalm (FRMK, ISBN 978-2-35065-031-9)

Work in magazines (French language unless stated otherwise)

- 1993- 'Le docteur' in: Frigorevue 3, January 1993.
- 1994- 'Taxidermie' in: Strapazin nummer 36, September 1994, 49-56. (German language)
- 1994- 'La mort d'Albert' in: Magazine de la Libération, December 1994, 59.
- 1994- 'Les soeurs siamoises' in: Frigobox 1, December 1994.
- 1995- 'Par example je n'aime pas les chiens' in: Lapin 8, May 1995.
- 1996- 'Lauriane et Halewijn' in: Lapin 10, January 1996.
- 1996- 'Initiation à l'escargot' in: Frigobox 6, February 1996.
- 1997- 'Extrait de carnet' in: Alice 4, March 1997.
- 1997- 'Marcel' in: Dietsche Warande & Belfort 4, 1997, 527-530.
- 1998- 'Reprends ta saloperie' in: Frigobox 9, January 1998, unpaginated.
- 1998- 'Insectes' in: Lapin 20, July 1998.
- 1998- 'Dimanche' in: Lapin 21, October 1998.
- 1999- 'Les deux fonctionnaires' in: Frigobox 10, November 1999, 35-45. Based on Franz Kafka's The Castle.
- 2001- 'Zoo' in: Lapin 30, December 2001.
- 2002- 'La cinquantaine' in: Lapin 33, November 2002.
- 2003- '2004 Apparition de Dolly dans la campagne anglaise' in: Beaux Arts Magazine hors-série, December 2003, 95-99.
- 2004- 'Der Igel' in: Strapazin nummer 75, June 2004, 9-16. (German language)

== Secondary literature ==
- Bart Beaty, Unpopular culture: transforming the European comic book in the 1990s (Toronto 2007), 93-95.
- Jan Baetens, 'Dominique Goblet: the meaning of form' in: Michael Chaney ed., Graphic Subjects (Madison 2011), 76-92.
- Jan Baetens, 'Dominique Goblet: écrire au féminin?' in: Interférences littéraires/Literaire interferenties, nr. 14, October 2014, 163-177.
- Christian Rosset, Éclaircies sur le terrain vague (Paris 2015), 259-262.
