= Clear Blue Sky =

British progressive rock band

- Origin: United Kingdom
- Genres: Progressive rock
- Years active: 1969–1973, 1995–1997, 2004–2018
- Label: Vertigo
- Past members: John Simms (guitar), Mark Sheather (bass), and Ken White (drums)

Clear Blue Sky was a British progressive rock band officially formed in London, England, but better known in Italy.

== History ==
Clear Blue Sky (earlier known as Jug Blues) were discovered by Nirvana musician Patrick Campbell-Lyons. Signed by Vertigo, they released their first self-titled album on that label, produced by Ashley Kozak.

In 2003, the Italian record label, Akarma Records, reissued their first vinyl album.

== Discography ==
=== Studio albums ===
- 1970: Clear Blue Sky (Vertigo)
- 1990: Destiny (Saturn)
- 1996: Cosmic Crusader

=== Live albums ===
2001: Out of the Blue
