= Sub Rosa (label) =

Belgian music label

- Founder: Guy-Marc Hinant and Frédéric Walheer
- Distributor(s): Forced Exposure; Cargo Records
- Genre: Electronic; World; Noise; Experimental; Film; Ritual
- Country of origin: Belgium
- Official website: subrosa.net

Sub Rosa is a record label based in Brussels specializing in avant-garde music, electronic music, world music and noise music. Directed by Guy-Marc Hinant and Frédéric Walheer, Sub Rosa has released over 250 titles of experimental, drone music, noise music, Musique concrète, ritual music and film music. The label has released archival material related to prominent twentieth-century avant-garde figures such as Marcel Duchamp, William S. Burroughs, James Joyce, and Kurt Schwitters. Sub Rosa also releases material from a number of important electronic music composers, such as (Luc Ferrari, Henri Pousseur, Tod Dockstader, Nam June Paik, Francisco López); and traditional music from around the world in anthologies of Inuit sound, the Master Musicians of Joujouka, Tibetan music and Bhutanese music, recorded by John Levy)

== History ==
Sub Rosa was established at the end of the ‘80s, and expanded its catalogue in the mid-‘90s through the release of electronic music. The soundtrack album by Laibach for the Neue Slowenische Kunst production Baptism was one of the labels' early releases. The name Sub Rosa was deduced from the first sentence of Gilles Deleuze and Félix Guattari's book A Thousand Plateaus and derives from the Latin expression sub rosa: literally translating as "under the rose," and figuratively meaning something secret or undercover. Over its three decades of operation Sub Rosa has gained cult status through its publishing of music that doubles as historical cultural artifacts.

== Anthology Series ==
Since 2001, Sub Rosa has been releasing Guy-Marc Hinant's An Anthology of Noise & Electronic Music series, completed as the formidable seven double volume experimental compilation in 2012. The project curated noise music and electronic musical recordings from the last hundred years by both obscure and leading sound artists like John Cage, Captain Beefheart, Pauline Oliveros, Sun Ra, Ryoji Ikeda, Einstürzende Neubauten, Johanna M Beyer, Morton Subotnick, Sonic Youth, Stephen O' Malley, Francisco López, Steve Reich, Cabaret Voltaire, and Mika Vainio.

== Electronic Music Observatory ==
Guy-Marc Hinant and Dominque Lohlé have also run a film production outfit since 2000, OME (Electronic Music Observatory, or Observatoire des musiques électroniques). OME produces documentaries on avant-garde music since World War II. A film on David Toop's record collection entitled I never Promised You A Rose Garden: A Portrait Of David Toop Through His Records Collection is one of a dozen completed projects. They also have made a documentary on noise music in China.

== See also ==
- List of record labels
