= Guy-Marc Hinant =

Guy-Marc Hinant (born 1960 in Charleroi) is a Belgian poet, writer, publisher, music producer and cinematographer. In the late 1980s Hinant, together with Frédéric Walheer, founded the Belgian record label Sub Rosa which specializes in avant-garde, electronic and noise music. The name of the record label was deduced from the first sentence of Gilles Deleuze's and Félix Guattari's book Mille plateaux (A Thousand Plateaus).

Hinant lives and works in Brussels. From 2002 to 2004 he worked on the musicological project An Anthology of Noise & Electronic Music.

Hinant has also written poetry and prose concerning his lover, the Belgian visual artist Dominique Goblet.

== Bibliography ==
- 2005 Les Asturies 1936 (Les éditions de l'heure, Charleroi)
- 2006 Le Maccabi de Tel Aviv (Les éditions de l'heure, Charleroi)
- 2006 Lower Rock Gardens (Les éditions de l'heure, Charleroi)
- 2006 Pensées flottantes de Nick Drake, le 25 novembre 1975 (Les éditions de l'heure, Charleroi)
- 2006 Plinthe (Les éditions de l'heure, Charleroi)
- 2006 Vingt-trois ans, deux mois en cinq jours (Les éditions de l'heure, Charleroi)
- 2007 David Purley, Roger Williamson, Zandvoort, 29th July 1973 (Les éditions de l'heure, Charleroi)
- 2008 23 fragments de la Sambre (Les éditions de l'heure, Charleroi)

Co-author

- 2007 Dominique Goblet, Faire semblant c'est mentir (L'Association, ISBN 978-2-84414-233-7)
- 2010 Dominique Goblet, Les Hommes Loups (FRMK, ISBN 978-2-35065-032-6)

== Filmography ==
- 1996 - The garden is full of metal
- 1999 - Éléments d'un Merzbau oublié
- 2003 - Le plaisir du regret. Un portrait d'Henri Pousseur
- 2007 - Luc Ferrari face à sa tautologie. Deux jours avant la fin
- 2007 - I Never Promised You a Rose Garden (A Portrait of David Toop Through His Record Collection)
- 2008 - Fuck you. Karkowski et la noise en Chine
- 2011 - Ecce Homo. Un portrait de Célestin Deliège
- 2014 - Ghost of silence (short documentary)
- 2014 - Whisky Time! Un portrait de Charlemagne Palestine (short documentary)
- 2015 - Birobidjan

== Secondary literature ==
- Norman Schreiber, The ultimate guide to independent record labels and artists: an A-to-Z source of great music (New York 1992), 211.
- Robert Wangermée, Musique-musiques 2000: chronique de la vie musicale en Wallonie et à Bruxelles (Sprimont 2001), 193.
- Bernd Herzogenrath, An American body-politic: a Deleuzian approach (Lebanon 2010), 281.
- Greg Hainge, Noise matters: towards an ontology of noise (New York 2013), 63.
