= Bobby Benson =

Nigerian musician (1922–1983)

- Benson playing the piano

Background information
- Born: Bernard Olabinjo Benson; 11 April 1922; Ikorodu, Lagos State, Nigeria
- Died: 14 May 1983 (aged 61) Lagos, Nigeria
- Occupations: Musician
- Instruments: Saxophone, guitar, piano

Bernard Olabinjo "Bobby" Benson (11 April 1922 – 14 May 1983) was an entertainer and musician who had considerable influence on the Nigerian music scene, introducing big band and Caribbean idioms to the Highlife style of popular West African music.

== Life ==
Bernard Olabinjo Benson was born on 11 April 1921 in Ikorodu, Lagos State, into an aristocratic family. His older brother T. O. S. Benson (1917–2008) would become a successful politician. While at secondary school, Bobby Benson also learned tailoring, but after leaving school he became a boxer for a brief period, and then a sailor in the Merchant Navy. In 1944, he left his ship in London, where he made his entertainment debut with the Negro Ballet, touring several European capitals. He met his senior wife, Cassandra (half-Scottish and half-Caribbean in origin), while in Britain, and upon returning to Nigeria in 1947, they established the Bobby Benson and Cassandra Theatrical Party.

Their performances included serious music, where he played guitar and saxophone while his wife danced. Based on the popularity of his music, he formed the Bobby Benson Jam Session, a dance band that played swing, jive, sambas and calypsos. In the 1950s, he expanded his band to 11 members, including a trumpet section, and began playing in the popular highlife style. Their first big hit was "Taxi Driver", followed by several others.

Benson was an entertainer and a comedian as well as a singer, a great performer. He had a show on NTA in the 1970s, where he performed as a stand-up comedian and magician, as well as playing and singing. He became a friend of B. B. King and Hugh Masekela. Benson established the Caban Bamboo, a popular nightclub later converted into the Hotel Bobby. He had several wives, and 10 children. Benson died in Lagos on Saturday, 14 May 1983.

== Music ==
Bobby Benson started by playing standard big-band music, but later introduced African themes, as a pioneer of Highlife music in Nigeria. His song "Taxi Driver" became a classic hit in West Africa, covered by several other musicians, blending Caribbean and jazz styles. Other hits were "Gentleman Bobby" and "Iyawo se wo lose mi", "Mafe", "Nylon Dress" and "Niger Mambo".

== Legacy ==
Various prominent musicians started out playing in Benson's band, including Roy Chicago, Sir Victor Uwaifo, Bayo Martins and Zeal Onyia. Victor Olaiya started as a trumpeter with Bobby Benson's band, and became one of the first Nigerian musicians to play highlife with his group the "Cool Cats". Another player with Benson's band who moved into highlife was Eddy Okonta, with his "Lido Band". Benson's innovations in musical style also influenced the evolution of popular Jùjú music.

"Taxi Driver", his biggest hit, and "Niger Mambo", an African melody with the Latin beat, were covered with different interpretations by American artists such as Stanley Turrentine and Jackie McLean. Randy Weston covered "Niger Mambo" in a solo performance on his 1978 album Rhythms-Sounds Piano, describing the piece as representing exactly what is called "high life style" in West Africa.

Benson also had musical collaborations with the internationally acclaimed and musical legend Eddy Grant, who stayed in Lagos and performed at the Hotel Bobby for many years. This collaboration lasted for many years, allowing Grant to be able to acclimatise himself to the Nigerian culture. Consequently, Grant was able to speak and record many successful songs and albums in Yoruba and Pidgin English.
