= Kai Pfeiffer =

Kai Pfeiffer (German: [ˈpfaɪfɐ]; born 1975, Berlin) is a German visual artist, graphic novelist and author of graphic journalism.

== Biography ==
Pfeiffer studied communications design at the Kunsthochschule Berlin-Weißensee from 1998 to 2003. In 1999 Pfeiffer and a group of militant visual artists founded the collective Monogatari. Starting in 2009 Pfeiffer teaches illustration and comics at the Kunsthochschule Kassel. Together with Johann Ulricht he edits the annual avant-garde comics' magazine Plaque.

From 2011 onward, Pfeiffer maintains an intimate conjunction with the Belgian visual artist Dominique Goblet. Together they drew Plus si entente (2014). Pfeiffer wrote and drew a graphic documentary essay entitled Radioaktive forever which was added to the Japanese anthology No Nukes 2012, edited by Ryuichi Sakamoto.

In the autumn of 2012 Pfeiffer was guest teacher at the Hochschule der Bildenden Künste Saar.

In September 2015 an exposition of drawings from the latest book Plus si entente by himself the Belgian visual artist Dominique Goblet at the Nabokov Museum in St. Petersburg was initially censored and shortly after dismantled by order of the University of St. Petersburg.

== Bibliography ==
- 2000 Opérations Esthétiques (Le Dernier Cri). (graphic novel)
- 2000 Hôpital Brut No. 5/6 (collective publication) (Le Dernier Cri). (contribution) OCLC 762156749
- 2003 Plaque 01. Magazin für Wort und Bild (Avant Verlag, ISBN 978-3-980772532). (magazine)
- 2014 Plus si entente (co-auteur Dominique Goblet) (Actes Sud BD, ISBN 978-2-330-03051-3). (graphic novel)
- 2015 Glücklich wie Blei im Getreide: Nacherzählungen (co-author Clemens J. Setz) (Suhrkamp, ISBN 9783518465875)

Monogatari (German language)

- 2001 Alltagsspionage
- 2002 Monogatari 6x6 Pinups
- 2003 Monogatari Monster
- 2004 Comicreportagen aus Basel

== Sources ==
- Shannon O'Leary and Joan Reilly eds., The big feminist but: comics about women, men and the ifs, ands & buts of feminism (Cupertino 2013), 195. ISBN 978-0615789385
- Christian Rosset, Éclaircies sur le terrain vague (Paris, 2015), 259–262.
