= Bayo Martins =

Nigerian jazz musician

- Born: Adebayo Santos Martins; November 24, 1932
- Died: August 12, 2003 (aged 70)
- Genres: Afro-jazz, Highlife, jazz
- Occupations: Musician, Journalist
- Instruments: Drums, congas
- Years active: 1950s to 2000s
- Formerly of: Nigerian Jazz Club, the Afro-Jazz ensemble,Koola Lobitos, Koriko Klan, African Messengers

Bayo Martins (1932–2003) was a Nigerian jazz musician. A drummer and conga player, he is considered a pioneer of Afro-jazz. He was a member of some pioneering African musical ensembles.

For years, he was instrumental in raising the cultural profile of Nigerian musicians and he was active in the musicians union. Martins was also a writer and author who had a number of books published, which include The Message of African Drumming and Give Musicianship a Chance.

== Background ==
=== Early life ===
Bayo Martins was born Adebayo Santos Martins on 24 November 1932 in Calabar, Nigeria. His involvement in music started in 1946 when his family moved to Lagos.

He was also known as John Martins.

=== Musical ===
According to the article, "Fela Kuti: Chronicle of A Life Foretold" by Lindsay Barrett that appeared in The Wire September 2011 issue, Martins was an influence on Fela Kuti, influencing what Kuti was listening to which had the effect of where Kuti headed musically, and the building of the connection between jazz and highlife music.

He was a friend of B. B. King. Their friendship began when King was in Lagos, and in turn he was the city guest of King in 1974.

== Career ==
=== 1950s to 1960s ===
Martins was part of a small jazz combo called the Nigerian Jazz Club which was founded by Bobby Benson in 1953. The ensemble included Zeal Onyia on trumpet, Paul Isamade on saxophone, Martins on drums and Benson on Piano. They just played modern jazz.

In 1959, Martins and his professional boxer older brother came to London. At some stage he undertook a course in journalism.

Martins left England in 1962 and returned to Nigeria. That year, the Afro-Jazz ensemble was formed, consisting of Chris Ajilo on tenor saxophone, Bayo Martins on drums, Zeal Onyia on trumpet, and Ayo Vaughan on bass. It later expanded into a five-piece ensemble and by 1964, it became the Jazz Preachers.

Martins was a member of the Koola Lobitos, a band that was formed by Fela Kuti in 1960. The ensemble also included Wole Bucknor on piano.

In 1964, Martins formed the African Messengers with Mike Falana; eventually, the band included Peter King, Humphrey Okoh and Paul Edoh in the line up. The group recorded 7-inch including "Highlife Piccadilly" and "Blues for Messengers", which was released on Carnival CV 7013 in 1964. They won the World International Jazz Contest in Switzerland. In addition to appearing at clubs and festivals, the ensemble had provided backing for the Four Tops, The Temptations and Diana Ross.

=== 1970s to 1990s ===
Bayo Martins worked with Grand Marcus, also known as Marcus Mvouka, playing congas on his Rythmes Et Voix Du Congo album.

Martins worked with the group Ikwezi, a group which consisted of Billy Allen, Don Ridgeway, Gerhard Schäfer, and Joan Faulkner. He played congas on their self-titled 1981 album that was released on Biton BIT 2122. He later had had heavy involvement with the Rhythms and Voices of Africa by A.K.V. Collective, which was released on Biton 2016. In addition to co-producing and co-designing the album with Don Ridgeway, he composed the tracks "Oniyangi", "The Way" and "Next Time Your Colour Talk". He also handled percussion, sang and provided narration. He also compiled the book, Fela Anikulapo-Kuti Abami Esa which was published in the late 1990s.

== Personal life ==
Martins was married to German born author Gerwine Bayo-Martins.

== Death ==
Martins died in Germany on 12 August 2003.

== Later years ==
Martins appears on two tracks from the various artists Highlife on the Move compilation which was released in 2015 on compact disc and vinyl LP. The track "Fancy Baby" is credited to John Santos Martins, and the track "Maggie" is credited to John Santos Martins, Zeal Onyia & His Band.

== Published works ==
=== Books ===
- Martins, Bayo (1983). The message of African drumming. Brazzaville: P. Kinouvou. ISBN 978-3-88827-021-5.
- Martins, 'Bayo (1979). Give musicianship a chance. Musician Foundation.

=== Articles ===
- Martins, Bayo (1997-08-22). "Felaism, Assessment of Fela Anikulapo-Kuti". Ntama – Journal of African Music and Popular Culture.
- Martins, Bayo (2002-08-10). "Musicians Against Second Slavery". The Guardian Nigeria – via nigeriaworld.com.

== Film, documentary etc. ==
Title	Role	Producer, Researcher	Year	Type	Other	Notes
Fela Anikulapo Kuti & Afrika 70 on tour in Italy	Bayo Martins (researcher)	Institute of African Studies, University of Ibadan	1980	Video	Archive of Sound and Vision, Institute of African Studies, University of Ibadan Modern Endangered Archives Program	Fela Anikulapo Kuti performance and tour in Italy (1980)
Bayo Martins on his Life and Music	Bayo Martins (researcher)	Institute of African Studies, University of Ibadan	1993	Audio	Archive of Sound and Vision, Institute of African Studies, University of Ibadan Modern Endangered Archives Program	Bayo Martins talking to the press about his life and music
Benin 100 years Centenary: (Palace Forum on Culture Development) Tape 2	Bayo Martins (researcher)	Institute of African Studies, University of Ibadan	1997	Video	Archive of Sound and Vision, Institute of African Studies, University of Ibadan Modern Endangered Archives Program	Seminar and exhibition on the anniversary of Benin centenary
Edwin (Eddy) Chukwuemeka Okonta Lying-in-State	Bayo Martins (researcher)	Institute of African Studies, University of Ibadan	1997	Video	Archive of Sound and Vision, Institute of African Studies, University of Ibadan Modern Endangered Archives Program	Late Edwin (Eddy) Chukwuemeka Okonta lying-in-state at the National Theatre. Wake held at Ikorodu.
Eine Kindheit in Nigeria (Wole Soyinka)	Bayo Martins (researcher)	Institute of African Studies, University of Ibadan	2000	Video	Archive of Sound and Vision, Institute of African Studies, University of Ibadan Modern Endangered Archives Program	Interview with Wole Soyinka
