= Mike Collier (producer) =

British A&R man, record producer and record label founder (died 2004)

- Born: Malcolm R. Collier; United Kingdom
- Died: August 12, 2004; London, England
- Occupations: A&R man, record producer, composer, music industry executive, music publisher
- Years active: 1950s–?

Mike Collier was a British A&R man, record producer, composer and record label founder. He founded the Collier, Feelgood, Flamingo and Sugar labels. The artists he worked with included The Isley Brothers and The Echoes.

== Background ==
Born in the UK, Collier moved to the United States around 1956. He found a job with London Records in New York as the promotion man. Six months later he was head of the label's promotion on the East Coast. In early 1957 he was heading national promotion for the label and their burgeoning Felsted label.

Hit songs that he was connected with up until 1959 were "Children's Marching Song", "Lichtensteiner Polka", "Around the World", and "I Talk to the Trees". Others were "Billy" that was released on Felsted and "Gotta Travel On", which was released on Monuement.

He headed the London-based Micol Productions, Ltd. in the 1960s. He was a contributor to the New Musical Express. He was also one of the directors of the Sugar label that was founded in 1969.

== Career ==
=== Late 1950s – early 1960s ===
==== Hugo & Luigi period ====
It was announced in the 14 March 1959 issue of Cash Box that Collier was appointed to the position of national Promotion Director of the pop record division within RCA Victor under Hugo & Luigi.

The Isley Brothers recorded the song "Shout" which made it to No. 47 on the pop chart in August 1959. The production was credited to Hugo & Luigi, but Collier is said to have been involved in the production of the record.

It was announced in the 30 January 1960 issue of Cash Box that Collier had taken on the role of personal assistant in the Artists and Repertoire Department. Prior to that he was working for the producers, overseeing the promotion men working in the field.

=== Further activities in the 1960s ===
The 20 January 1962 issue of Cash Box reported that Collier had just left on an extensive road trip to promote the single "Roll Him Over" by Georgia Brown and "Midnight in Moscow" by Jan Burgens. He was reportedly jumping for joy over the initial reaction to the Georgia Brown single.

In the summer of 1962, after spending seven years in the United States, Collier returned to England.

According to the 10 November 1962 issue of Cash Box, the British Decca and Philips labels would be releasing records that were produced by Collier's London-based company, Micol Productions. He had also signed contracts to enable this. A logo, “A Micol Production” would be on the Decca and Philips labels. However, for US releases Micol would be making other arrangements. At the same time he had also formed Mido Music Ltd., a publishing company to handle catalogues from several US publishers. One company, the BMI firm Miken Music Corp., which was his own, would also be using Mido Music Ltd.

As of 1967, he was the professional manager of Campbell-Connelly, which according to New Musical Express was the world's largest British-owned publishing company.

It was reported in the 17 May 1969 issue of Billboard that Mistro Music Ltd. director Collier had been on a recent trip to New York. He had wrapped up a deal with Ivan Mogul Music Ltd. / Sweden. The deal was for an exclusive agreement for the Mistro Music catalogue in Scandinavia.

=== 1970s to 1980s ===
As of late 1978, Collier was the director of Peterman & Co. Ltd. which was part of the Carlin group of companies. At that time he was immersed in disco music and matters related to that genre. He also contributed the article "Britain all ready for a disco revolution" to the 16 December 1978 issue of Music Week.

=== 1990s ===
According to the 4 May 1991 issue of Music Week, Collier, while holding the position as managing director for Lightman Music, which published sports themes written by Richard Lightman, was involved in a deal with Leosong Copyright Management. Ray Ellis had been with Leosong since 1977. Collier said that he was "one of the finest copyright administrators in the industry".

== Record labels ==
=== Collier ===
It was reported by Cash Box in the magazine's 30 September 1961 issue that on his London-distributed Collier label, the single, "Everybody Fish" (Part 2) had things happening for it. It was reviewed in the same issue. In the Best Bets section, both sides of the record (Parts I & II) were sax-led tracks with vocal ad-libs. They were given a B+ rating. Collier had co-written the single with L. Kerrin (Lawrence Kerrin).

=== Sugar ===
Sugar was a company run by directors Ashley Kozak and Mike Collier. Charles Ross was the production director. According to the 31 May 1969 issue of Record World, the UK distribution was to be handled by Pye and for the United States and Canada, it would be Bell Records. Larry Uttal of Bell had just completed a deal for that.

According to the 16 August 1969 issue of Billboard, Sugar Records, a new record label, was going to release music by West Indian artists. Rex Oldfield, the marketing director, made the announcement that all of the music would be recorded in the West Indies and it would be overseen by production director Charles Ross. Three artists to have their work released that month were Claude Sang, Joe White and Frenz.

In January 1970, Raymond Morrison's single "Girl I Want to Hold You" backed with "Money Can't Buy Life", was released on the label. The review by Chris Welch of Melody Maker noted Morrison's distinctive vocals and the bright backing beat, where he referred to it as "A sort of bluebeat come reggae come throat pastille boogaloo".

The 11 April 1970 issue of Disc and Music Echo mentioned that there were two Sugar singles out that week. They were, "Come and Do the Right Thing" by Three Coins (cat# SU 106) and "I'm in Love Again" by Claude Sang (cat# SU 105).

=== Feelgood ===
In 1976, Collier and co Carlin Music publisher David Watson formed the Feelgood label. The fiest release for the label was "Black Ant" by Osibisa.

=== Flamingo ===
Flamingo was a record label founded by Mike Collier that released disco music. It was connected to Magnet Records. The label had produced three charting singles by Canadian group Bombers and another group called Match.

The 5 May 1979 issue of Music Week reported that Collier now had a new label, Flamingo. They kicked off with "Get Dancin'" by The Bombers that was released on 6 April. They were to follow that with a single by Match, and then the third release was to be by a group called Happy People featuring Polly Brown.

According to the 26 January 1980 issue of Music Week, following a successful year, the label was splitting from Magnet and Collier was in discussions with other people about a new licensing deal for the label.

=== Blaze ===
By October 1979, Collier and co-director Freddy Bienstock had launched the Blaze record label. This was their second label in six months. They were kicking off on 9 November with a single by the Seattle-based band New Day, "C'Est La Vie". Distribution in the UK and Ireland was handled by CBS.

== Death ==
Mike Collier died of a heart attack in London, England on 12 August 2004 at age 71. He was survived by his wife, Joyce, and three children.
