= Eddy Okonta =

Nigerian highlife musician (born 1935)

- Born: Edwin Chukwuemeka Okonta; 1935 (age 90–91); Akwukwu Igbo
- Origin: Delta State
- Genre: Highlife
- Occupations: Bandleader, musician
- Instrument: Trumpet
- Years active: 1950-1997
- Label: Ekimogun

Edwin Chukwuemeka Okonta was a Nigerian highlife musician who was prominent in the highlife scene during the late 1950s and the 60s. Prior to branching out on his own, he was an apprentice under Sammy Akapabot and later played with Bobby Benson's band.

== Discography ==
=== Singles ===
- "Otanjele" (Sweet Banana)
- "Asili"
- "Oriwo"
- "Kelewele"
- "Anyidi"
- "Ejenelulo"
- "Okokoko"
- Abele
