= Joe White (singer) =

- Born: William Joseph White; 4 September 1941; Kingston, Jamaica
- Died: 26 September 2023 (aged 82) London, England
- Labels: Blue Cat; Coxsone; Doctor Bird; Dutchess; Island; King's; Magnet; R&B; Roosevelt; Success; Sugar; TrenchTown; Treasure Isle; Trojan; WIRL
- Formerly of: Joe White and Chuck; Joe & Della; Joe White & Irene; Joe White, Glen & Trevor

Joe White was a UK-based Jamaican singer and musician who had several hits when he was in his home country. He was part of the duos Joe White and Chuck, Joe & Della, Joe White & Irene, the trio Joe White, Glen & Trevor, and other ensembles.

== Background ==
Joe White was born William Joseph White in Kingston, Jamaica, on 4 September 1941. He was raised in a single-parent household by his mother Veronica Topey. He attended the Alpha Boys' School at South Camp Road in Kingston. He acquired a trade in tailoring.

In addition to being a vocalist, Joe White played the piano and melodica. Recording at Studio One, he had hits such as "My Guiding Star". Other hits possibly recorded in different venues included "My Love for You" and "So Close".

Recording under the direction of Sonia Pottinger, as part of the duo Joe White and Chuck, he scored with the ballad "Every Night" in 1966, which caught on instantly as a hit and stayed in the Jamaican charts for several months. The song was actually recorded in one take.

During his time, he had recorded dozens of singles for a plethora of record labels.

== Career ==
=== 1960s ===
In 1966, the duo Joe and Della recorded the song "So Close" which was backed with "Eighth Games" by the Baba Brooks Band and released on Doctor Bird DB 1043. Also the same year, the duo Joe White And Chuck had the "One Nation" single released on Sonia Pottinger's Gay Feet label (cat# S 24). It was backed with "Musical Sermon" by Baba Brooks and His Recording Band. The song was described as positive and hopeful and stresses the unity of one person. It was also described as being similar to Derrick Morgan's "Forward March".

In 1968, his recording "I'm So Proud" was released in Jamaica on the Flame label.

According to 16 August 1969 issue of Billboard, Sugar Records was a new record label that was going to exploit the music of West Indian artists. The recordings would be overseen by production director Charles Ross. Three artists had their work released that month: Claude Sang, Joe White, and Frenz. The songs that White recorded for his single were "Yesterday" and "I Am Free".

=== 1970s - 2000s ===
In 1975, he recorded his Since The Other Day album that was released on Magnet MGT 006. It was arranged and produced by Rupie Edwards His Jah Jah dub album was also released that year.

In 1977, he released his version of "You'll Never Find Another Love Like Mine" on Wadada WAD-301. Also the same year, his Love for Every Family album was released on TrenchTown TRELP 002.

== Death ==
Joe White died on 26 September 2023 in Hackney, East London.
