= Peter King (Nigerian musician) =

Nigerian musician (1939–2023)

Peter King Adeyoyin Osubu (1939 – 29 August 2023), known as Peter King, was a Nigerian musician who played several instruments, but was best known as an alto saxophonist playing a combination of Afrobeat and jazz. Peter King is perhaps better known in Europe and America than in Nigeria for his "Miliki Sound" on the record A Soulful Peter King, where he played popular classics such as "Sincerely", "We Belong Together" and "Just Because".

== Life ==
Peter King was born in 1939 in Enugu in the Southeastern region of Nigeria and grew up in Lokoja, Lagos, and Port Harcourt. In 1957 he joined the Roy Chicago band in Ibadan, playing the maracas and then the conga drum. He moved to other bands in Ibadan and then Lagos, playing the double bass, drums and then the alto sax. In 1961 he went to London, England, where he studied at various schools of music, including Trinity College of Music.

While in London, King joined with drummer Bayo Martins and trumpeter Mike Falana to form the African Messengers group. Other musicians in the line up were Humphrey Okoh, Paul Edoh, David Williams, James Mene and Arthur Simon. The group performed at festivals and clubs, and served as backup band for acts like the Four Tops, The Temptations and Diana Ross. The African Messengers recorded many 45 rpm records. "Highlife Piccadilly", a fusion of Highlife and jazz, was a hit. King formed another band The Blues Builders with which he toured Europe and Northern Africa.

King returned to Nigeria in 1969, and with his group The Voice of Africa performed on the war front during the Nigerian Civil War. Returning to London in 1971, he toured Europe, America and Japan with his group Shango. He assembled and arranged a big band to back the singing group Boney M on their first live concert tour across Europe in 1977. He recorded nine studio albums between 1975 and 1978, and wrote music for several plays and television shows. In 1979 King returned to Nigeria and formed the P.K. band. He composed music for soap operas and recorded three further albums. In the early 1980s Peter King and his P.K. Band played on the NTA and at the National Museum, Lagos, for three years.

King died on 29 August 2023, at the age of 84.

== Music ==
King played in the Sonny Rollins-Gene Ammons-John Coltrane tradition. He had a unique tone, flawless articulation and a fresh turn of mind in improvisations, and was the leading tenor saxophone voice to have come from the Nigerian highlife and afrobeat traditions. Talking of his hit "Highlife Piccadilly", King said: "Our philosophy was to play modern jazz with highlife as the basis ... Afrojazz is my musical direction and a mission". King combined afrobeat with a funk style similar to James Brown. His album Shango was acclaimed by critics. Opening with a simple flute melody, tambourines enter followed by complex duets between horns and looping guitar riffs.

== School of Music ==
King founded his School of Music in 1982, in a three-room apartment in Maza Maza. At first it had about 30 students, though since then has expanded greatly, and is now located in Badagry. It has lecture halls, rehearsal rooms, an assembly-concert hall and hostel facilities. The school has been assisted by Canadian musicians Oliver Jones and Archie Allen and greatly assisted by the French government. Almost two thousand students have graduated from the school since 1982. The school provides practical tuition and grants certificates and diplomas. It prepares students for the professional examinations of Associate, Licentiate and Fellowship of the Trinity, Royal and London Schools of Music and the Guildhall School of Music and Drama. Aṣa and Benjamin James of The Cavemen are some of the notable alumnus of King's school of music.

In January 2007 the French Ambassador in Nigeria inaugurated the new facilities of the Peter King school of music at Badagry, Lagos State.

== Discography ==
- Shango (Mr. Bongo Records, 1974)
- Miliki Sounds (Orbitone, 1975)
- Omo Lewa (Orbitone, 1976)
- A Soulfull Peter King (Orbitone, 1977)
- Moods (Tyrone Records, 1978)
- African Dialects (Grandstand, 1979)
- Palm Wine Vendor (2002)
