= Klooks Kleek =

London music venue of the 1960s

- Interactive map of Klooks Kleek
- Coordinates: 51.5463°N 0.1910°W
- Owner: Dick Jordan

Construction
- Opened: 11 January 1961
- Closed: 28 January 1970

Klooks Kleek was a jazz and rhythm 'n' blues club on the first floor of the Railway Hotel, West Hampstead, north-west London. Named after Klook's Clique (Savoy 12006), a 1956 album by jazz drummer Kenny Clarke, the club opened on 11 January 1961 with special guest Don Rendell (tenor saxophone) and closed nine years later on 28 January 1970 after a session by drummer Keef Hartley's group.

There were over 1200 sessions at Klooks Kleek, around 300 of them featuring jazz, and the others rhythm 'n' blues. Zoot Money, Ten Years After, John Mayall, and Graham Bond recorded live albums at Klooks Kleek and it was a popular venue in the British blues and rhythm and blues boom of the early 1960s.

== History ==
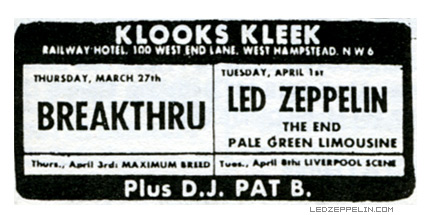
1969 concert announcement for Led Zeppelin at Klooks Kleek

=== Jazz ===
Klooks Kleek founder Dick Jordan was a jazz enthusiast and aspiring trombonist who had made previous attempts to establish a jazz club in the inner suburbs of north-west London. The club proved to be third time lucky. Saxophonist Don Rendell played at the club a record 20 times, followed by Dick Morrissey and Tubby Hayes. The only non-British jazz came from the Polish Modern Jazz Quartet, led by Zbigniew Namysłowski, who returned by three weeks later.

The club's policy of featuring top British jazz soloists made the club viable, as long as the young adults remained interested in jazz. The promoters—in 1962, Dick Jordan had invited childhood friend Geoff Williams to partner him at Klooks Kleek—also believed in making their customers a part of the club rather than just a crowd of fee-payers. Thus, there were competitions and coach outings which helped ensure loyalty to the club. However, jazz music at Klooks Kleek ceased on 11 November 1964.

An attempt to revive jazz nights in "Dopey Dick's" on the same premises lasted for 18 months from April 1967. With earlier performance restrictions removed, several influential American jazz musicians appeared, including saxophonists Ben Webster, Rahsaan Roland Kirk, Sonny Rollins, and Zoot Sims, and drummer Max Roach. British artists included pianist Stan Tracey, and the man responsible for bringing the Americans to his own famous club in Soho, Ronnie Scott. The last-ever jazz session, on 29 October 1968, featured organist Jimmy McGriff.

=== Rhythm and blues ===
In 1963, the promoters became aware of a burgeoning scene in blues and R&B, which arrived at Klooks Kleek in the shape of Georgie Fame and the Blue Flames. The band played a mix of Louis Jordan, soft soul, funk, and even vocal versions of bebop numbers such "Parker's Blues". Their first appearance at the club was on a scheduled jazz night. They opened the Tuesday R&B nights on 10 September 1963 and performed a further 21 times, continuing to appear at this small venue even after having two No. 1 chart singles. Their manager, Rik Gunnell, allowed them to work for "peanuts" because the band liked the ambience.

Appearing regularly in rotation with Fame were the Graham Bond Organisation (GBO). Apart from the leader, Graham Bond, on keyboards and saxophones, the rhythm section comprised Ginger Baker and Jack Bruce. Guitarist John McLaughlin (of the Mahavishnu Orchestra) was also a member of the GBO.

By the beginning of 1964, R&B nights had become so successful that an additional Monday session was introduced. Georgie Fame and the Blue Flames opened on 13 April that year to a full house. Monday nights proved not to be viable, and on 1 April 1965, Thursday became the second club night. Zoot Money, who was already on the way to becoming a club legend, opened. The last Monday session took place on 26 July 1965; Thursdays endured until November 1969. Also appearing in the early '60s was Rufus Thomas ("Walking the Dog").

=== Most appearances ===
The Mike Cotton Sound's 45 appearances were made mostly on Thursdays when they were effectively the house band.

Graham Bond made 39 appearances under the R&B banner and a further four as a modern-jazz artist.

Zoot Money and his Big Roll Band performed 34 times. They were the club's most popular attraction.

John Mayall brought many future stars through his various bands. He appeared 33 times and did much to foster interest in blues nationwide.

Georgie Fame and the Blue Flames played 22 times within the first two years of R&B at Klooks Kleek. Commercial success then took them into larger venues, but spin-off bands (e.g., the Night-Timers, who played 21 gigs) kept the genre going at smaller clubs like Klooks.

=== Blues ===
The early '60s, and 1963 in particular, also evidence a burgeoning interest in both country and urban blues, with national promoters bringing groups of American blues artists over for concert and club tours. By 1964, this was in full swing, and Klooks featured well-known bluesmen, particularly in the Autumn of '64 and Spring of '65. Sonny Boy Williamson II (backed by the Moody Blues), John Lee Hooker, Little Walter, Howlin' Wolf, T-Bone Walker (backed by John Mayall), Champion Jack Dupree, and Buddy Guy all delighted their audiences. Hooker and Wolf both made return visits in later years; Freddie King and Otis Spann appeared in 1969. Alexis Korner, a crusader for the blues for more than a decade, also appeared half-a-dozen times in 1964.

== Notable performers ==
Stevie Wonder appeared so long ago he was still prefixed as “Little”, between his initial Motown hits and the emergence of the adult superstar in the 1970s. Also paying their dues at Klooks Kleek were inter alia Jon Lord of Deep Purple, playing in the Artwoods, named after Ronnie Wood's older brother and leader of the group; Purple themselves played one gig in 1969 before the big time beckoned; Bluesology had a 20-year-old called Reg Dwight, later Sir Elton Hercules John; Cream, all of whose members were familiar with KK from previous bands, played a couple of gigs before their first mega-bucks US tour and again between that one and the next; they were recorded “unofficially” on the latter gig in November 1966.

The Nice, who gave birth to Emerson, Lake and Palmer (ELP), were regulars in 1967 and 1968, as was Family with Roger Chapman on vocals and Ric Grech, later of Blind Faith, on bass, violin and cello in 1969 following the release of their debut album Music in a Doll's House. Rod Stewart appeared with three different bands – his own Soul Agents backed Buddy Guy, he was a member of Shotgun Express with Peter Green and Mick Fleetwood, and appeared with the Steampacket, with Long John Baldry, Brian Auger and Julie Driscoll. Ten Years After's live LP Undead was recorded at KK in 1968. The original Fleetwood Mac with Peter Green were regulars in 1969; Christine Perfect's keyboards and vocals in their later incarnation had given her first-ever professional performance at KK with Chicken Shack in 1968. The Mac made full use of their appearances at KK by making unbooked recording raids on Decca Studios next door. [4]

The proximity of the club to Decca also helped a new group to test their proposed single on a live audience. On 29 September 1964, the interval band, the Moody Blues, performed Go Now.

Other KK regulars who established themselves on the national stage in later years were The Alex Harvey Band, Chris Farlowe, and Geno Washington and the Ram Jam Band. Another regular in 1968/69 were Family, a progressive rock outfit.

== Visitors and commendations ==
Situated next to Decca Studios, Klooks Kleek was a favourite drop-in before or after work for music stars, notably Tom Jones, Lulu, and Mike Smith of the Dave Clark Five. Eric Burdon often dropped in, particularly when Georgie Fame or Zoot Money were appearing, sometimes accompanied by other members of the Animals. The surprise visit which passed into legend was the one made by Jimi Hendrix whose manager Chas Chandler, formerly of the Animals brought him in one night when John Mayall was topping the bill. Jimi was never booked, but he was invited to jam with the John Mayall band, and that night's crowd was ecstatic. Individual memories of Klooks Kleek abound, some of them misted by time but all of them enthusiastic [5].

The bands themselves loved the location and the ambience of Klooks Kleek. Jimmy Page said, “We loved doing gigs in places like Klook’s Kleek but in the end, they were turning away more people than could actually see the show”.[6] At Georgie Fame's 55th birthday bash at The Forum, he brought on Zoot Money to do “Papa’s got a brand new bag” with the words, “He had the best RnB band in the 60s”, which Zoot denies—“No he did”. As the number finishes with both at the top of their form Zoot shouts, “Klook’s Kleek 1964” [7]. John Mayall and Dick Heckstall-Smith both recall dropping in to the club to see Cream and Graham Bond respectively. Dave Thompson in his history of Cream mentions that the audience at KK “was already spilling through the downstairs bar and into the street. If people couldn’t actually see the band they could listen through the wall.” [8]

== Other clubs at the Railway Hotel ==
Following the closure of Klooks Kleek, the owners of the Railway Hotel established both a Moonlight Club and a Starlight Club, neither of which had any connection with Klooks.

== Recordings ==
Live at Klooks Kleek, the Graham Bond Organisation recorded on 5 October 1964. Released long after recording and the reservoir for several later releases in different countries, some as recent as 2006.

Solid Bond recorded 16 months earlier on a jazz night GBO was a sextet of stars – Bond, Baker, Bruce, Heckstall-Smith and McLaughlin. Warner Bros WR 3001, re-issued Aug 2008 on Rhino Records.

John Mayall plays John Mayall recorded live at Klooks Kleek 07/12/1964, Decca Records 1965

Zoot Money “Zoot!” live at Klooks Kleek 31/05/1966. Columbia SX 6075

Ten Years After “Undead” live at Klooks Kleek 14/05/1968 Deram SML 1023

The Artwoods "Live at Klooks Kleek" was instigated by Mike Raven, a DJ/producer on the short-lived pirate station Radio Atlanta, which had become Radio Caroline South, by the time of the recordings in late 1964. The Artwoods had been so successful as authentic blues purveyors on a dozen interval spots at the club that they stepped up to topping the bill nine times before moving countrywide. The original tapes were transferred to vinyl for availability in June 2016 in the Record Collector magazine's Rare Vinyl series.

Don Rendell's "Live at Klooks Kleek" was recorded live at Klooks Kleek on 11 September 1963 the recording was suggested by Ray Goganian, the then KK doorman and a keen amateur recordist and made using Dick Jordan's Ferrograph tape recorder and some quality microphones. The original tapes were transferred to vinyl for availability in April 2017 in the Record Collector magazine's Rare Vinyl series.

"Cream Live at Klooks Kleek" recorded on 15/11/1966 without the knowledge of the club promoters.
