= The Graham Bond Organisation =

British band

- Also known as: The Graham Bond Organization
- Genres: Rock; blues; blues rock; jazz rock; freakbeat
- Years active: 1963–1967; 1969–1970
- Labels: Decca; Page One; Columbia; Ascot
- Past members: Graham Bond; Jack Bruce; Dick Heckstall-Smith; Ginger Baker; Jon Hiseman; John McLaughlin

The Graham Bond Organisation (GBO) were a British blues/blues rock group of the mid-1960s consisting of Graham Bond (vocals, keyboards, alto-saxophone), Jack Bruce (bass), Ginger Baker (drums), Dick Heckstall-Smith (tenor/soprano saxophone) and John McLaughlin (guitar). They recorded several albums and further recordings were issued when the group's members achieved fame in rock bands like Cream and Blind Faith, and also in jazz rock. On original releases, the spelling of the band's name varied between the British "Organisation" with an S and the American "Organization" with a Z. Record Collector magazine have referred to the group as freakbeat, a retrospective label describing the transition from British beat and rhythm and blues to psychedelia.

== History ==
At the start of the British rhythm and blues boom the Graham Bond Organisation earned a reputation for playing aggressive R & B with prominent jazz and blues. Bond was the primary songwriter but encouraged the other musicians to contribute material, including Dick Heckstall-Smith's "Dick's Instrumental" and Ginger Baker's "Camels and Elephants", in which the drummer explored ideas he eventually developed into his signature piece "Toad". Jack Bruce's harmonica-driven version of Peter Chatman's "Train Time" would become a staple in Cream's live performances.

The first commercial recording by the original lineup of the Graham Bond Organisation was released under the name of singer Winston G. (real name Winston Gork). A protégé of expatriate Australian impresario Robert Stigwood, Winston had launched his career under the pseudonym "Johnny Apollo". In early 1965 both Winston and the Graham Bond Organisation were part of Stigwood-promoted UK package tour headlined by Chuck Berry (on which Stigwood incurred heavy losses). Since they shared management, the Graham Bond Organisation backed Winston on the Parlophone single "Please Don't Say" / "Like a Baby"; the A-side was credited "Arrangement directed by Graham Bond" and the B-side "Arrangement directed by Ginger Baker". The band signed for Decca Records who released their dynamic version of the Don Covay composition "Long Tall Shorty" in 1964, backed with "Long Legged Baby" ("Long Tall Shorty" had been popularised by US singer/organist Tommy Tucker). Their best-known single, and the second released under their own name, was "Tammy" (Jay Livingston/Ray Evans) / "Wade in the Water" (trad. arr. group), recorded on 4 January 1965 at Olympic Sound Studios, London (EMI Columbia DB 7471, 29 January 1965). The track also appeared on their debut album The Sound of 65 (EMI Columbia, March 1965).

In 1965, the band appeared as themselves in the film Gonks Go Beat, where they played two songs including "Harmonica".

The band's fourth 45 featured the single-only tracks "Lease on Love" / "My Heart's in Little Pieces" (July 1965). The A-side is noteworthy for its pioneering use of the Mellotron, which Bond also played on several tracks on their second LP There's a Bond Between Us (November 1965); the album also included studio versions of the two aforementioned instrumentals. The single and the album tracks are believed to be the first 'popular' recordings to feature the instrument, since "Lease on Love" appeared more than a year before the first UK chart hit to feature a Mellotron—Manfred Mann's "Semi-Detached Suburban Mr. James" (October 1966)—and at least 18 months before The Beatles made the Mellotron world-famous with "Strawberry Fields Forever" (January 1967). The tracks recorded for the second album were also the last cut by the original Graham Bond Organisation lineup before Jack Bruce was fired in August 1965. On 7 August 1965 they played at the Richmond-on-Thames Jazz and Blues Festival which was televised on the US television show Shindig!.

The band gained minor attention after their "Waltz for a Pig" (originally titled "Ode to a Toad") was issued as the B-side of the Who's 1966 single "Substitute", which reached number 5 on the UK Singles Chart. The band was billed as 'the Who Orchestra' for this release and the track was written by Baker.

The group was plagued with problems because of substance abuse and Baker's ongoing feud with Bruce. Retrospectives of Cream indicate that Bond deputised Baker to fire Bruce, who joined Manfred Mann for a short time until July 1966 when Baker formed Cream with Bruce and Eric Clapton. The group recorded "St. James' Infirmary" without Bruce on 10 January 1966, which was released in the United States on the Ascot label and was received indifferently. Another sideman was Mike Falana on trumpet. He already had a degree of star status by the early 1960s. Falana, sometimes spelt as Mike Felana was with Bond in 1963 and at some stage, replaced Jack Bruce with Bond then playing bass on the pedals.

Bond reformed the Organisation with Jon Hiseman on drums. As a trio, Bond, Heckstall-Smith and Hiseman recorded the single "You’ve Gotta Have Love Babe" / "I Love You" (both by Graham Bond) on 18 January 1967 for Page One Records. Bond left for the USA, releasing two albums there in 1969 with well-known session players. Hiseman and Heckstall-Smith would leave to join John Mayall & the Bluesbreakers for Bare Wires (recorded April 1968) before forming Colosseum in the summer of 1968, with Tony Reeves on bass and Dave Greenslade keyboards.

The Graham Bond Organisation's lack of commercial success, internal struggles and drug problems brought the band to an end in 1967, but its importance was soon recognised with the vogue for blues and progressive rock and the increased sales of albums. The double album Solid Bond, released by Warner Bros. Records in 1970, compiled live tracks recorded in 1963 by the Graham Bond Quartet (Bond, McLaughlin, Bruce and Baker) and a studio session from 1966 by the final trio version of the Graham Bond Organisation (Bond, Heckstall-Smith and Hiseman).

Graham Bond reunited with his former bandmates in the early 1970s, playing with Ginger Baker's Air Force and also spending a short time touring with Jack Bruce's band. He subsequently signed a contract with Vertigo Records and was reportedly off drugs by this time, although he was becoming increasingly obsessed with black magic. Bond died in May 1974, when he was hit by a train at London's Finsbury Park underground station.

As of 2023, John McLaughlin is the last surviving member of the band, following the death of Baker. Baker was the last surviving member of the band who had performed on all releases by the band.

== Members ==
- Graham Bond – keyboards, saxophone, vocals (1963–1967; died 1974)
- Jack Bruce – bass, harmonica, vocals (1963–1965; died 2014)
- Ginger Baker – drums, percussion (1963–1966; died 2019)
- John McLaughlin – guitar (The Graham Bond Quartet, 1963)
- Dick Heckstall-Smith – saxophone (1963–1967; died 2004)
- Jon Hiseman – drums, percussion (1966–1967; died 2018)
- Mike Falana – trumpet (around early 1966; died 1995)
- Ron Day – Bass (around 1968/69; died 2024)

== Discography ==
=== Albums ===
Title	Album details
The Sound of '65	Released: 26 February 1965; Label: Columbia (33SX 1711); Format: LP, CD
There's a Bond Between Us	Released: 10 December 1965; Label: Columbia (33SX 1750); Format: LP, CD

- 1988 Live at Klooks Kleek (recorded October 1964) (also issued as The Beginning of Jazz-Rock)

=== Singles ===
Year	Title	Album
1964	"Long Tall Shorty" b/w "Long Legged Baby"	Non-album single
1965	"Tammy" b/w "Wade in the Water"	The Sound of '65
1965	"Tell Me (I'm Gonna Love Again)" b/w "Love Come Shining Through"	Non-album single
1965	"Lease on Love" b/w "My Heart's in Little Pieces"	Non-album single
1966	"St. James Infirmary" b/w "Soul Tango"	Non-album single
1967	"You've Gotta Have Love Babe" b/w "I Love You"	Non-album single

== See also ==
- Steampacket
- Manfred Mann
- Shotgun Express
- Blues Incorporated
- John Mayall
- Colosseum
- Harvey Mandel
