= Osso Exótico =

Osso Exótico is an experimental, drone music project from Portugal formed in 1989. Utilizing a range of mainly acoustic instruments (often modified) such as glass harmonica, piano strings, percussion, violin, the ensemble created drone, at times mystical and psychedelic ambiences that can be found in their extensive discography. With an always evolving line-up, brothers André and David Maranha have been, since the early times to the present day, the core of this band, that would later, incorporate Patrícia Machás and Francisco Tropa. Together with André and David Maranha they're still the basic line-up. Other members through the years have been António Forte and Bernardo Devlin in the original quartet format and later Oliver Vogt, Manuel Mota and Riccardo Dillon Wanke.

== Discography ==
- Osso Exótico I, 1990 ed. Multinational MN1 (Portugal) LP
- Osso Exótico II, 1991 ed. Carbo Records CR002 (Portugal) CD
- Osso Exótico III, 1992 ed. Carbo Records CR003 (Portugal) CD
- Osso Exótico IV Música 1, 1993 ed. Staalplaat/Soleimoon KIP 004 (Netherland, EUA)CD
- Osso Exótico V, 1997 ed. Ananana III001 (Portugal) CD
- Osso Exótico VI (church organ works), 1998 ed. Sonoris SON-03 (France) 7"
- Osso Exótico 7, 1998 ed. Drone Records DR-37(Germany) CD
- Osso Exótico VIII imaginação morta CD, 1999 ed. To be released CD "circunscrita", 1999 ed. Namskeio Records (Switzerland) CD
- Osso Exótico & Verres Enharmoniques, 2006 ed. Phonomena PAAM-030CD (J/USA)CD
- Untitled Osso Exótico + Z'EV, 2007 ed. Crouton NO.39 (USA)CD
- Sablier Osso Exótico ed. Serralves (Portugal)
