= John Burch (musician) =

English pianist, composer and bandleader (1932–2006)

- Born: John Alexander Burchell; London, England
- Died: 18 April 2006 (aged 74)
- Genres: Jazz
- Occupation: Musician
- Instrument: Piano
- Labels: Rhythm & Blues Records, AndromiDen Recordings
- Formerly of: Don Rendell And His Big 8, The Johnny Burch Octet, Johnny Burch Trio, Don Rendell Quintet, The Dick Morrissey Quartet, The New Don Rendell Quintet, Tommy Chase—Ray Warleigh Quartet

John Burch (born John Alexander Burchell; 6 January 1932 – 18 April 2006) was an English pianist, composer and bandleader, equally at home playing traditional jazz, bebop, blues, skiffle, boogie-woogie and rock.

== Background ==
Burch was born in London on 6 January 1932. Having started piano lessons at age 12, he played in army bands during his military service stationed in Germany and in the late 1950s toured military bases with his trio. In 1959, he toured France with bassist Jeff Clyne and saxophonist Bobby Wellins.

In 1960 Burch joined Allan Ganley's Jazzmakers. In the early and mid-1960s he led a quartet and an octet with Dick Heckstall-Smith, Ray Warleigh, Peter King, Hank Shaw and future Cream founders Ginger Baker and Jack Bruce. In the 1960s, Burch was one of many UK-based musicians who "moved easily between traditional jazz, bebop, blues, skiffle, boogie, and rock". As an accompanist, he played with American musicians who were visiting the UK; in 1966 these included Freddie Hubbard, Rahsaan Roland Kirk, and Red Rodney.

As a composer, he wrote "Preach and Teach" (1966) which provided the B-side of Georgie Fame and the Blue Flames' hit "Yeh Yeh" and was also recorded by Buddy Rich. He composed Fame's follow-up, "In the Meantime", and also its B-side, "Telegram".

He was also a teacher on the Barry Summer School jazz-education project, which was attended by pianist Keith Tippett.

== Career ==
In a performance, John Burch played with Don Rendell, Graham Bond, Tony Archer, and Phil Kinorra. The songs performed were, "Bring Back the Burch", "Manumission", "Blue Monk", "Jeannine", "You Loomed Out of Loch Ness", "So What", and "The Haunt". The performance was recorded, credited to the New Don Rendell Quintet and released as Roarin' on Jazzland JLP 51 in 1961.

On 19 September 1962, Burch on piano played in the Don Rendell Quintet at the Paris Cinema. Other musicians included Don Rendell on tenor and soprano saxophone etc., Graham Bond on alto saxophone, Dick Heckstall-Smith on tenor saxophone, Tony Archer on bass and Ted Pope on drums. The session was recorded.

=== Johnny Burch Octet ===
In 1963, Burch, Mike Falana John Mumford, Graham Bond, Stan Robinson, Miff Moule, Jack Bruce and Ginger Baker participated in a live broadcast for the BBC.

In 1965, Burch, Hank Shaw, Ken Wray, Ray Swinfield, Peter King, Harry Klein, Jeff Clyne and Mike Scott participated in a live broadcast for the BBC in November 1965.

In 1984, he re-formed the octet with Dick Morrissey. He dedicated his "Resurrection Ritual Suite" to Dick Morrissey and on his death had just completed a tribute to Ronnie Scott called "Just by Chance".

Discography

Albums
Act	Release	Catalogue	Year	Notes
Johnny Burch Octet	Jazzbeat	1960s Records 33XXR&B39	2019	LP
Johnny Burch Octet	Jazzbeat	Rhythm & Blues Records RANDB055	2019	CD

=== Johnny Burch Trio ===
The Johnny Burch Trio was active in 1965. It consisted of Johnny Burch on piano, Ron Mathewson on Bass and Alan Green on drums.

Discography

Albums
Act	Release	Catalogue	Year	Notes
Red Price, Ray Warleigh & Chris Pyne with the Johnny Burch Trio	Groovin' High: Jam Session At The Hopbine, 1965	Acrobat – ACMCD4393	2017	CD

== Death ==
Burch died from cancer on 18 April 2006.

== Later years ==
In 2019, the recordings by the Johnny Burch Octet that was recorded in 1963 and 1965 were released on the album, Jazz Beat. Also in 2019, Burch appeared on the compilation So Much, So Quickly: British Modern Jazz Pianists 1948-62, playing on the track "Manumission" which was credited to John Burch featured With The New Don Rendell Quintet.
