= Siobhan McDonald =

Irish artist

Siobhán McDonald
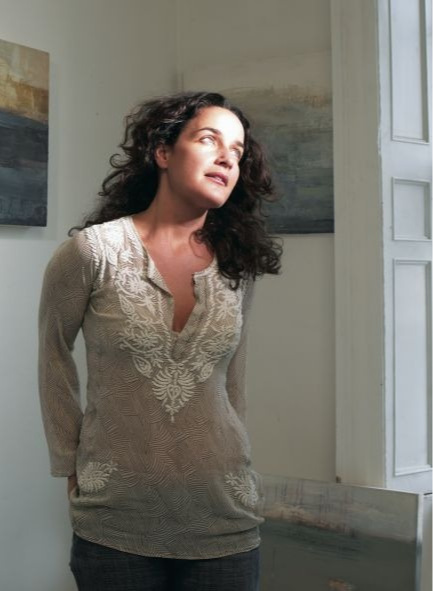
- Born: New York City
- Education: The University of Ulster
- Known for: Crystalline: Hidden Monuments
- Website: www.siobhanmcdonald.com

Siobhán McDonald is an Irish visual artist and was born in New York. She holds a bachelor's degree in Art and Design from The Ulster University and a Masters in Visual Arts Practices from Dún Laoghaire Institute of Art, Design and Technology 2011.

McDonald is an artist in residence in the School of Natural Sciences at Trinity College Dublin (2020-2023). She is working with The European Space Agency (ESA) and The JRC European Commission to explore ecology in light of current ecological concerns. Her works manifest in many forms including painting, drawing, film and sound.

== Work ==
Siobhán McDonald's art practice draws attention to contemporary topics dealing with air, breath and atmospheric phenomena, weaving scientific knowledge into her art in a poetic and thoughtful manner.

She questions what is still unknown to science and explores the Anthropocene and the recent consequences of our treatment of nature.

== Career ==
In 2020, she was selected to work with European Cultural Institutions such as Center for Fine Arts BOZAR and Ars Electronica on a new project about environmental change. The commissioned artworks will be presented at the Serpentine Gallery and Ars Electronica in 2023. McDonald has shown at Bozar, Brussels, 2020; Deutsches Hygiene-Museum DHMD, 2020; Volta, Basel 2019; Limerick City Art Gallery, 2019; Deutsches Hygiene-Museum DHMD, 2019; The National Trust-Fox Talbot Museum, UK, 2018; Centre Culturel Irlandais, Paris, 2018, among others. Centre for Fine Arts, Brussels.

She is represented in many collections, both public and private such as The Arts Council of Ireland, Allied Irish Banks, Bank of Ireland, The Ulster Museum and Trinity College Dublin.

== Awards ==
- 2020 - Bursary Awarded by Arts Council Ireland.
- 2020 - Climate Whirl arts program, 2020, University of Helsinki
- 2018 - Creative Ireland Award
- 2017 – The Trinity Creative Award, Trinity College Dublin.
- 2017 - Culture Ireland Award: Imagining Ireland in the UK.
- 2017 – Bursary Award by Arts Council Ireland.
- 2017 – Residency at Centre Culturel Irlandais, Paris.
- 2016 – BAI Sound and Vision, RTÉ Lyric FM.

== Solo exhibitions ==
- Monuments for the future, Limerick City Gallery of Art, Ireland.
- When plants remember, The Henry Fox Talbot Museum, UK.
- Crystalline, Highlanes Gallery, Ireland.
- Crystalline, Centre Culturel Irlandais, Paris.
- Eye of the Storm, The Galway Arts Centre.
- Disappearing Worlds, Taylor Galleries, Dublin.
