= Stonedhenge =

Studio album by Ten Years After
- Released: 7 February 1969
- Recorded: 3–15 September 1968
- Studio: Decca, West Hampstead, London
- Genre: Psychedelic blues; jazz-rock; boogie rock; progressive blues; experimental
- Length: 35:48
- Label: Deram
- Producer: Mike Vernon

Ten Years After chronology
Undead (1968)	Stonedhenge (1969)	Ssssh (1969)

Stonedhenge is the second studio album, and third album overall, by English blues rock band Ten Years After, released in February 1969 by Deram Records. It was recorded with producer Mike Vernon at London's Decca Studios in September 1968.

Believing that the group's live album Undead (1968) had already perfectly captured their talents, frontman and guitarist Alvin Lee conceived Stonedhenge as a change in direction. A psychedelic blues album, it expands the group's boogie rock sound into more experimental territory, incorporating jazz, progressive pop and musique concrète styles, with deployment of studio effects, stereo panning and tape manipulation. Influences on the recording included Tod Dockstader and Canned Heat. Although largely written by Lee, the record also feature solo pieces from all four band members. The title alludes to marijuana and the ancient monument Stonehenge, the latter of which is illustrated on the psychedelic album cover.

On release, Stonedhenge was the band's biggest album yet, reaching number six on the British charts and number 61 in the United States. Music critics have discussed the album's variety and the band's performances. The album set the group up for a heavy year of touring and performances at numerous American festivals, including a famous appearance at Woodstock. Stonedhenge has been re-released several times, including with bonus tracks in 2002.

== Background and recording ==
After forming in 1965, Ten Years After were distinguished from hardcore blues groups in Britain by mixing the genre with rock and roll and jazz, and were part of the burgeoning progressive music scene. The group's debut album Ten Years After (1967) was largely ignored, although it essayed the group's "raw, jazzy approach to the blues", and their popularity only began to blossom via months of fatiguing club work. Having believed the record did not capture their live sound, the group followed it with the live album Undead (1968), recorded at a small club in London. According to Colin Larkin, the album "spread the word" that frontman Alvin Lee was "not only an outstanding guitarist, but the fastest by a mile." It was their first record to chart in the United Kingdom and United States.

Lee was so pleased with Undead, considering it to have captured the group's sound perfectly, that he conceived Stonedhenge as a radical change in direction. He recalled: "I was so happy with [Undead]. When I first heard it I thought, what are we going to do next? After that my attitude was, 'Let's go into the studio and experiment, because we've already made the ultimate album'." Ten Years After recorded Stonedhenge at Decca Studios in West Hampstead between 3–15 September 1968, working with producer Mike Vernon and engineers Roy Baker and Martin Smith. Vernon had acquired British blues pedigree, having worked with Eric Clapton and Fleetwood Mac. Baker is also credited for the "special sound effect" on "No Title", while Smith is credited for providing the "train effect" on "Speed Kills". Alvin Lee's credits include "Chinese fans" ("Skooby-Oobly-Doobob"), clog stamping ("Hear Me Calling"), and a "steel on steel effect" ("No Title"). The musician recalled that there were "[p]ipes and stuff like that all over the place" during the recording, and described the process as being defined by "not particularly what we wanted to do, but the way we did what we happened to do".

== Composition ==
Stonedhenge features seven songs written by Alvin Lee, along with a song each from bass guitarist Leo Lyons, keyboardist Chick Churchill and drummer Ric Lee. According to Beat Instrumental, it is a more of an experimental album than the group's earlier work, deploying "a lot of trickery and studio effects combined with fairly untypical Ten Years After material". According to critic Hal Horowitz, the group experimented to expand their basic boogie rock sound, working with Vernon to steer into "a more jazz- and blues-oriented direction" without losing their "basic concept", while Melody Maker said that although there are still traces of blues, the record also heavily incorporates jazz and progressive pop material, resulting in an album that is hard to classify. Author Eric vd Luft wrote that although it is as "mostly bluesy" as the group's earlier albums, it "rocked a bit harder". The album has been described as 'progressive blues' and the group's sole example of a psychedelic blues album, while author Robert Santelli wrote that, as with the band's other 1960s records, it is a jazz-rock album with "a blues core."

Alvin Lee wrote that the album was frequently "very experimental" as he was into his "musique concrète phase", noting the strong influence of avant-garde/industrial composer Tod Dockstader on the record. He added: "It was still very underground at that point, and we were making music for that audience – for ourselves, really, because we were that audience too." Lyons agreed that the album was an attempt to experiment, adding: "Stereo records had just begun to appear on the scene and we tried to do something different." Another influence was the group's tour mates Canned Heat, who were also expanding beyond their boogie rock sound in the period. According to Horowitz, Alvin minimised his fleeting guitar playing, "preferring to work his style into a more organic fusion", and noted that "A Sad Song" has no speedy guitar solos. According to critic Allen Evans, Alvin's vocals "range from the gutbucket to faraway, Oriental sadness, with lead guitar playing to match." The group and Vernon also experimented with primitive stereo panning and tape manipulation.

The record is varied in content, spanning rockers and low-key, moody material, and features four short solo pieces for each member alone on their instrument. The swinging "Woman Trouble" evidences the group's more jazz- and blues-inflected sound, while "Skoobly-Oobly-Doobob" features scat singing. "Hear Me Calling" reveals the influence of Canned Heat, and has been dubbed the album's stand-out track. "Three Blind Mice" is an adaptation of the nursery rhyme, performed as a one-minute drum solo by Ric Lee. According to David Hepworth, the track was included so that Ric "could share in the royalties for allegedly songwriting". The eight-minute "No Title" creates a moody atmosphere for the first half until Alvin plays a "terse, loud extension on its main riff", setting up a ghostly organ solo from Churchill. According to OffBeat Magazine writer Brett Milano, the song "showed how imaginative blues-rock could get", writing that its "structure—beginning as near silence, with instruments being added until it turns to a harsh electronic wail—isn’t far from the studio art that the likes of Brian Eno would popularize later on." "Speed Kills", the closing song, returns the group to a more familiar, rocking sound, although it features a "surprise ending".

== Title and artwork ==
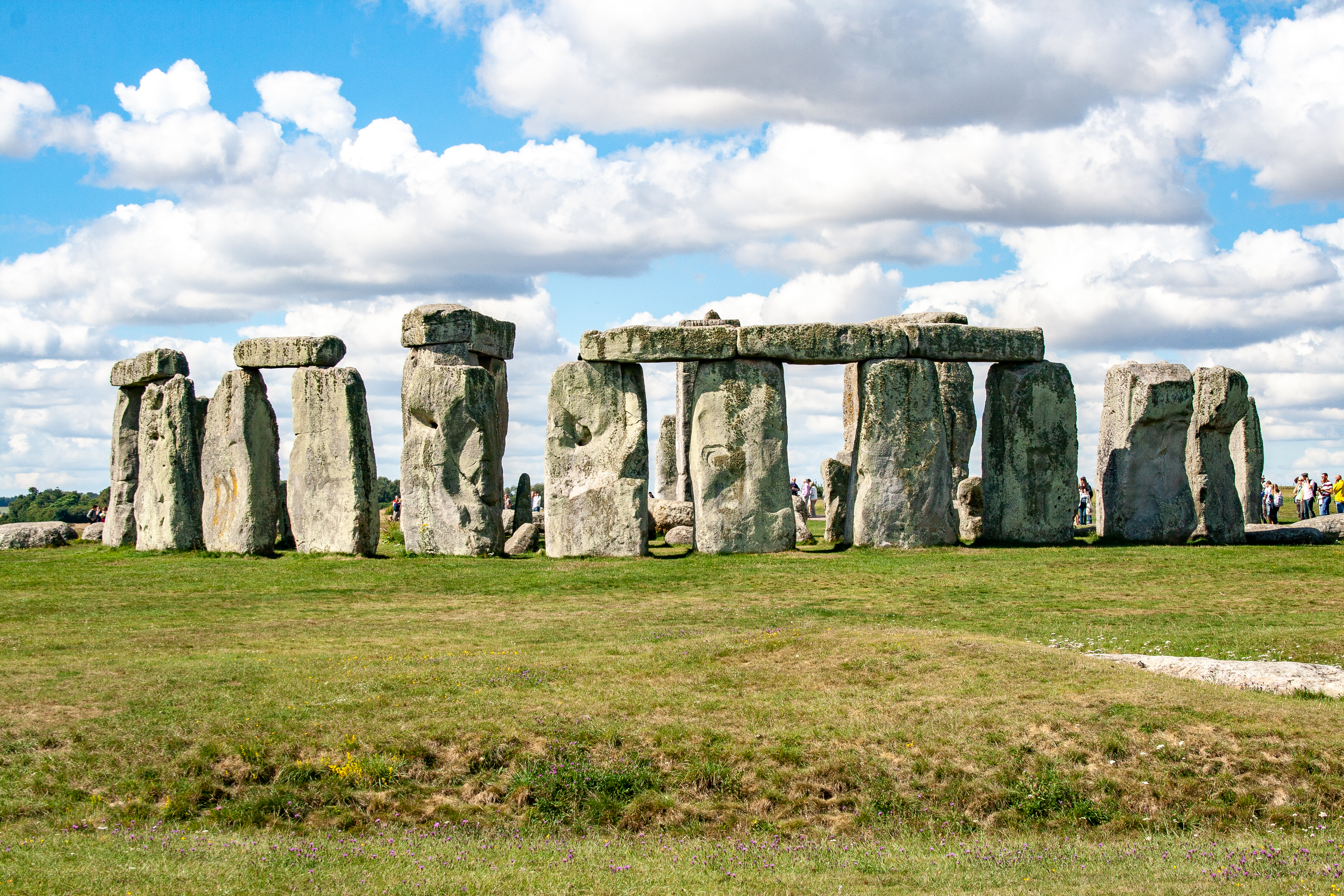
The title refers to Stonehenge, which is also depicted on the sleeve.

The title Stonedhenge, described as a "not-so-subtle" choice, alludes to marijuana and the prehistoric monument Stonehenge in Wiltshire. The site had become linked with popular music in the 1960s, as various Paganisms and New Age beliefs increased in popularity with the nascent counterculture. According to author Thomas E. Harkins, "it was the album's title, as much as anything, that would endear the group to the American counterculture." Correlating the music and the site, journalist Rory O'Connor says that Stonedhenge "seemed to be an attempt at tuning in cosmic vibrations, perhaps because [Alvin] Lee has a feeling for the strange atmosphere that the ancient Druid ruins at Stonehenge reportedly has hanging round it. Hence the name of the LP."

The artwork, described by Harkins as psychedelic in style, was one of the earliest album covers to depict Stonehenge. The foldout sleeve features an illustration of the stone circle's surviving northeast sector, with a stylised mid-summer sun rising through the stones, while the landscape around the monument is described by Timothy Darvill as being "covered in Beardsley-esque beats and people." Richie Havens, who played at Woodstock in 1969 alongside Ten Years After, also depicted the stone circle on the sleeve of his album Stonehenge (1970), and both sleeves have been described as doing "much to further popularise the site within the hippie movement." Stonedhenge also pre-empted Hawkwind's frequent use of the site on their sleeves.

In 1985, archaeologist Christopher Chippindale borrowed the title Stonedhenge for his review of that year's ill-fated summer solstice celebrations at the stone circle and the Battle of the Beanfield. In 1999, Adam Sweeting of The Guardian described the album title as "uncannily far-seeing", due to the emergence of an academic theory that Stonehenge was designed as a venue for worshippers to enter "shamanistic trances" to "travel through time and space to visit their ancestral spirits."

== Release and promotion ==
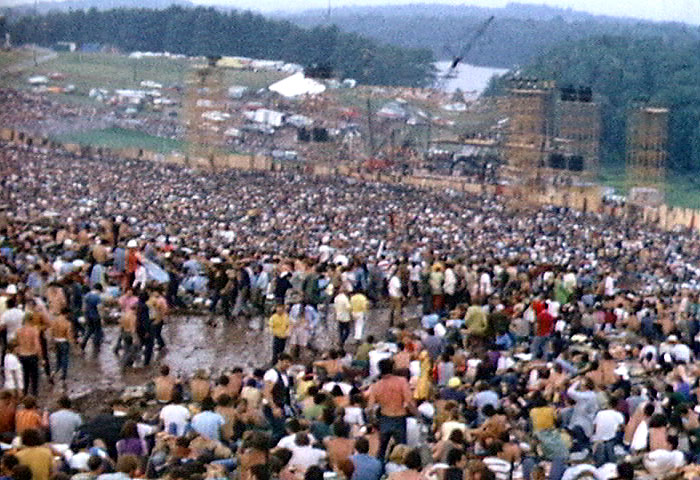
The Woodstock stage, where Ten Years After played in August 1969

Stonedhenge was released on 7 February 1969 by Deram Records. The record was advertised on the front of Billboard in January 1969, referring to the group as "exciting, different, and wild!" A single, "A Sad Song", was also released in Japan. The group's touring helped both Undead and Stonedhenge sell steadily, although Stonedhenge outsold the former. The album reached number six on the UK Albums Chart, becoming their first top ten album, and stayed at the position for three weeks. In the US, where Deram was a subsidiary of London Records, the album reached number 61 on the Billboard Top LPs chart, becoming their first album to reach the top 100. The album was one of many London releases at the time that combined for the label's strongest ever sales, and it joined other successful albums by the Moody Blues, John Mayall and Savoy Brown in helping London succeed in what Billboard called "the hard rock derby". In 1993, Andy Smart of Evening Post wrote that the album "sold millions".

Music critic Hugh Fielder wrote that Stonedhenge "set up Ten Years After for a momentous year." The release of the album coincided with the band beginning to regularly play in the US, and the record's strong sales won the group an invite to play at the Woodstock festival in New York in August 1969. According to The Daily Telegraph, the group's "energy and good-natured performance generated a strong audience response". According to Rough Guides writer Chris Coe, the inclusion of their performance of "I'm Going Home" in the companion film Woodstock (1970) catapulted the band to "superstar status". Alongside Woodstock, Ten Years After played five other festivals that summer, including the Seattle Pop Festival, Texas International Pop Festival and the Newport Jazz Festival (in the only year that rock bands were allowed on the bill). The group's touring of the US, and their "direct, prolonged contact" with the country's music scene, influenced their subsequent album, Ssssh (September 1969).

== Critical reception ==
=== Contemporary reviews ===
In a contemporary four-star review, New Musical Express writer Allen Evans deemed Stonedhenge to be "a most ear-worthy effort, varied in content and all self-written", and contended that the group "could go places". He praised the scat singing on "Skoobly-Oobly-Doobob" and Lyons' bass work on "Faro", while describing Churchill's organ and piano solos as "real knock-outs". The 'pop panel' at Melody Maker deemed it a "magnificent" album where Ten Years After advance their music "several stages further" from Undead, which they considered one of the best British blues albums. The reviewers praised the group's musicianship and their "use of dynamics and the way they hold themselves back so that when all the stops are pulled out it has some meaning and great dramatic effect", considering the resulting music to be "impossible to classify" but, with help from Vernon's production, "totally effective". They concluded that it was one of the year's best albums. Alan Jones of Lincolnshire Echo called it an "electrifying" album that showcases the band's talents, including Alvin Lee's "lightning guitar solos".

In the US, Wayne Harada of The Honolulu Advertiser wrote that the group have "scores of good material" and prove that "they're tuned to the youthful current." Journal and Courier writer Frank Arganbright called it a progressive blues album which "actually swings", and considered it "a good English jam ... flirting with different bags and coming up with a nice tight sound." He also highlighted Alvin's "extremely capable" guitar work and called Lyons "the most highly-regarded bassist in England". Less favourably, Bob Harvey of The Edmonton Journal considered the record to be as bad as Undead, calling them "sleeper" albums, and wrote that while the title and artwork are interesting, the music falls "just short of being excellent, and in the rock music business, that classifies them with the bad, or worse, with the mediocre." While adding that the music is occasionally unique and groovy, he contended that the group should "stick to blues...they have great potential if they would concentrate on one particular area and develop their music, their vocals, their sound in general."

=== Retrospective appraisal ===
Professional ratings
Review scores
Source	Rating
AllMusic	3.5/5 stars
The Rolling Stone Album Guide	2/5 stars
The Virgin Encyclopedia of Popular Music	3/5 stars

In an article for The Tampa Tribune, Rory O'Connor called Stonedhenge "probably the best example of the varied influences in Ten Years After's music. But once again the band got hung up on repeating themselves." In his book Sixties Rock: A Listener's Guide (1985), Robert Santelli writes that while the album does not feature any of Ten Years After's most popular songs, it is "the best example of the group's jazz and blues flavor", and described "Going to Try" and "Hear Me Calling" as "intriguing tracks since they incorporate an odd assortment of blues and jazz riffs that never really settle into one mold." Reviewing the record for AllMusic, Hal Horowitz emphasised the group's attempts to broaden their sound, and wrote that while it does not always gel – singling out the four solo pieces as "an interesting idea that ends up as a distraction" – the album "boasts some terrific performances by a group that was hitting its peak." He also praised the panning and tape manipulation for being impressive.

In a piece for Classic Rock, Hugh Fielder wrote that the album could be fairly described as Ten Years After's "most innovative album: light and trippy on the insistent 'Going To Try' and the bouncy 'Hear Me Calling', a positively spooky on 'A Sad Song'. And despite the substances the band were tight and confident." Alan Clayson of Record Collector considered "Hear Me Calling" and "Speed Kills" to be among the album's highlights, while noting that listeners in a "perverse mood" would instead favour "Three Blind Mice". In their list of the band's best songs, Dave Swanson of Ultimate Classic Rock ranked "A Sad Song" fourth, calling it one of the group's "most haunting tunes" and singling out its "brutally sparse arrangement", and "Hear Me Calling" third, comparing its "bouncey bluesy groove" to Status Quo.

== Legacy and reissues ==
In a 2016 interview with It's Psychedelic Baby! Magazine, Lyons reflected that he enjoyed Stonedhenge in 1969 but found it "certainly very strange" to listen to contemporarily, believing "Hear Me Calling" to the best song and adding that the album is "probably best listened to stoned." Ric Lee enjoys the album for being "very experimental for its time." In 1972, "Hear Me Calling" was covered by Slade.

In December 1970, Stonedhenge was one of four Ten Years After albums released on 8-track cartridge by Ampex. In August 1988, the LP was re-released by Request Records. The album made its CD debut in June 1989, when reissued by Deram. A remastered version appeared in 2002 with liner notes from Ric Lee and four bonus tracks, including a single edit of "I'm Going Home" and the 15-minute "Boogie On". Further CD reissues appeared in 2004 (Beat Goes On), 2009 (Universal) and 2015 (Deram). In 1972, Deram released the outtakes compilation Alvin Lee and Company; described by Zoo World as among the "most eagerly awaited albums" of its time, the album was dismissed by Alvin Lee as comprising "inferior material for the Stonedhenge album. It didn't get put on, and because we left Deram after Watt they put it out themselves." According to Alvin, the group tried to prevent the album's release, but found that the issue of such a collection was permitted in their contract with the label.

== Track listing ==
All songs written by Alvin Lee, except where noted.

Side one

1. "Going to Try" – 4:52
2. "I Can't Live Without Lydia" (Chick Churchill) – 1:23
3. "Woman Trouble" – 4:37
4. "Skoobly-Oobly-Doobob" – 1:44
5. "Hear Me Calling" – 5:41

Side two

1. "A Sad Song" – 3:24
2. "Three Blind Mice" (traditional, arranged by Ric Lee) – 0:57
3. "No Title" – 8:15
4. "Faro" (Leo Lyons) – 1:13
5. "Speed Kills" (Alvin Lee, Mike Vernon) – 3:42

=== 2002 CD bonus tracks ===
11. "Hear Me Calling" (single version) – 3:44
12. "Woman Trouble" (US version) – 4:48
13. "I'm Going Home" (single version) – 3:34
14. "Boogie On" – 14:44

== Personnel ==
Adapted from the liner notes of Stonedhenge.

Ten Years After

- Alvin Lee – vocals, guitar, piano, Chinese fans
- Chick Churchill – organ, piano
- Ric Lee – drums, tympani
- Leo Lyons – bass, bow-bass, string bass, percussion

Additional personnel

- Roy Baker – sound effects on "No Title"
- Martin Smith – train sound effects on "Speed Kills"
- Simon Stable (credited as "Count Simon (Stable) de la Bedoyere") – bongos on "Going to Try"
- Mike Vernon – backing vocals on "Hear Me Calling"

== Charts ==
Chart (1969)	Peak position
UK Albums (OCC)	6
US Billboard 200	61
