= Ssssh =

Ssssh.

Studio album by Ten Years After
- Released: 26 September 1969
- Recorded: June 1969
- Studios: Morgan, London
- Genres: Blues rock, psychedelic rock
- Length: 32:44
- Label: Deram
- Producers: Alvin Lee, Ten Years After

Ten Years After chronology
Stonedhenge (1969)	Ssssh. (1969)	Cricklewood Green (1970)

Professional ratings
Review scores
Source	Rating
AllMusic	4/5 stars
Rolling Stone	(negative)
The Rolling Stone Album Guide	2.5/5 stars
The Village Voice	B

Ssssh is the third studio album by the British blues rock band Ten Years After, released in 1969. The album peaked at No. 20 on the Billboard 200 and No. 4 on the UK charts.

== Track listing ==
All songs composed by Alvin Lee, except where noted.

Side one

1. "Bad Scene" – 3:20
2. "Two Time Mama" – 2:05
3. "Stoned Woman" – 3:25
4. "Good Morning Little Schoolgirl" (Sonny Boy Williamson) – 6:34

Side two

1. "If You Should Love Me" – 5:25
2. "I Don't Know That You Don't Know My Name" – 1:56
3. "The Stomp" – 4:34
4. "I Woke Up This Morning" – 5:25

== Personnel ==
Ten Years After

- Alvin Lee – guitar, vocals
- Leo Lyons – bass guitar
- Ric Lee – drums
- Chick Churchill – organ

== Charts ==
Chart (1969–70)	Peak position
Canada Top Albums/CDs (RPM)	17
Finnish Albums (The Official Finnish Charts)	14
German Albums (Offizielle Top 100)	6
Norwegian Albums (VG-lista)	16
UK Albums (Official Charts)	4
US Billboard 200	20

== Certifications ==
Region	Certification	Certified units/sales
Canada (Music Canada)	Gold	50,000^{^}
^{^} Shipments figures based on certification alone.
