= Undead (Ten Years After album) =

Live album by Ten Years After
- Released: July 1968 [USA] 16 August 1968 [UK]
- Recorded: 14 May 1968
- Venue: Klooks Kleek, London
- Genre: Blues rock
- Length: 38:25; 68:41 (reissue)
- Label: Deram
- Producer: Mike Vernon

Ten Years After chronology
Ten Years After (1967)	Undead (1968)	Stonedhenge (1969)

Professional ratings
Review scores
Source	Rating
AllMusic	3/5 stars
Rolling Stone	(positive)

Undead is a live album by Ten Years After, recorded at the small jazz club Klooks Kleek in London on 14 May 1968, and released in July of that year. The show combined blues, boogie and jazz playing that merged more traditional rock and roll with 1950s-style jump blues. The album "amply illustrates" Alvin Lee's "eclectic" use of the pentatonic scale mixed with other modalities.

== Track listing ==
Side one

1. "I May Be Wrong, But I Won't Be Wrong Always" (Alvin Lee) – 10.28
2. "Woodchopper's Ball" (Woody Herman, Joe Bishop) – 7:48

Side two

1. "Spider in My Web" (Alvin Lee) – 7:46
2. "Summertime" (George Gershwin) / "Shantung Cabbage" (Ric Lee) – 5:56
3. "I'm Going Home" (Alvin Lee) – 6:27

=== 2002 CD reissue ===
1. "Rock Your Mama" (Alvin Lee) – 3:46
2. "Spoonful" (Willie Dixon) – 6:23
3. "I May Be Wrong, But I Won't Be Wrong Always" – 9:49
4. "Summertime" / "Shantung Cabbage" – 5:44
5. "Spider in Your Web" – 7:43
6. "Woodchopper's Ball" – 7:38
7. "Standing at the Crossroads" (Elmore James & Robert Johnson) – 4:10
8. "I Can't Keep from Crying, Sometimes / Extension on One Chord / I Can't Keep from Crying, Sometimes (reprise)" (Al Kooper, Chick Churchill, Leo Lyons, Alvin Lee, Ric Lee) – 17:04
9. "I'm Going Home" – 6:24

== Personnel ==
Ten Years After

- Alvin Lee – guitar, vocals
- Chick Churchill – organ
- Ric Lee – drums
- Leo Lyons – bass

== Charts ==
Chart (1968)	Peak position
UK Albums (OCC)	26
US Billboard 200	115

== Release history ==
Year	Type	Label	Country	Catalog #
1968	LP	DERAM	US, Canada	DES 18016
1968	LP	DERAM	Netherlands	9286 927
1968	LP	DECCA	Germany	6.21 585
1968	LP	DERAM	UK	SML 1023
2002	CD	DERAM	UK	8828992
2002	CD	DERAM	Germany	820 533-2
2009	CD	Universal Distribution		94203
