= Victor Olaiya =

Nigerian musician (1930–2020)

Victor Olaiya OON
- Born: Victor Abimbola Olaiya; 31 December 1930; Calabar, Nigeria
- Died: 12 February 2020 (aged 89) Lagos, Nigeria
- Occupations: Musician, Trumpeter, bandleader, businessman

Victor Abimbola Olaiya OON, (31 December 1930 – 12 February 2020), also known as Dr Victor Olaiya, was a Nigerian trumpeter who played in the highlife style. Though famous in Nigeria during the 1950s and early 1960s, Olaiya received little recognition outside his native country. Alhaji Alade Odunewu of the Daily Times called him "The Evil Genius of Highlife."

== Early life ==
Olaiya was born on 31 December 1930, in Calabar, Cross River State, the 20th child of a family of 24. His parents, Alfred Omolona Olaiya and Bathsheba Owolabi Motajo, came from Ijesha-Ishu, a town next to Ikole Ekiti, in the present day Ekiti State.

Olaiya came from a very rich family. His father's house, Ilọijọ Bar, stood at 2 Bamgbose Street, Lagos Island, until it was demolished in September 2016.

== Career ==
At an early age he learned to play the bombardon and the French horn. After leaving school he moved to Lagos, where he passed the school certificate examination in 1951 and was accepted by Howard University, US, to study civil engineering. Olaiya instead pursued a career as a musician, to the disapproval of his parents. He played with the Sammy Akpabot Band, was leader and trumpeter for the Old Lagos City Orchestra and joined the Bobby Benson Jam Session Orchestra.

In 1954, Olaiya formed his own band, the Cool Cats, playing popular highlife music. His band was chosen to play at the state ball when Queen Elizabeth II of the UK visited Nigeria in 1956, and later to play at the state balls when Nigeria became independent in 1960 and when Nigeria became a republic in 1963. On the latter occasion, Olaiya shared the stage with the American jazz musician Louis Armstrong. During the Nigerian Civil War of 1967–70, Olaiya was given the rank of a lieutenant colonel (honorary) in the Nigerian army, and his band played for the troops at various locations. The Cool Cats later travelled to the Congo to perform for United Nations troops.

Olaiya renamed his band to the All Stars Band when they played the 1963 International Jazz Festival in Czechoslovakia.

Olaiya also ran a business that imported and distributed musical instruments and accessories in West Africa, he also established the Stadium Hotel in Surulere.

Olaiya was bestowed the second rank (officer) of the national Order of the Niger award. In 1990, he received a fellowship of the Institute of Administrative Management of Nigeria. For a period, he was also president of the Nigerian Union of Musicians.

== Personal life ==
Olaiya had several wives. He had children and grandchildren. One of his daughters, Moji Olaiya, was a Nollywood actress. He sang with his son Bayode Olaiya.

Olaiya died on 12 February 2020 at the Lagos University Teaching Hospital, at age 89.

== Music ==
Olaiya's music bridges between highlife and what would become Afrobeat.

His musical style was influenced by James Brown, with horn parts harmonised in Brown's style, as opposed to the mostly unison lines of Afrobeat. The music includes the swinging percussion of Tony Allen, but not the syncopated style that Allen later pioneered.

Olaiya released an album with Ghanaian highlife musician E. T. Mensah. Both the drummer Tony Allen and vocalist Fela Kuti played with Olaiya and went on to achieve individual success.

== Discography ==
A partial list of albums:

Date	Group	Album	Format	Label
Late 1950s/Early 1960s	Victor Olaiya & his Cool Cats	Odale Ore b/w Mofe Muyon	10-inch 78	Badejo's Sound Studios BBA 150
1960s?	Various Artists	Catchy Rhythms from Nigeria – Vol. 2	10-inch LP	Philips West Africa [Lagos] P 13401
1961	Dr. Victor Olaiya & his All Stars	Olaiya's Victories	10-inch LP	Philips [Netherlands] 13403
Early 1960s	Various Artists	Catchy Rhythms From Nigeria – Vol. 3	(10-inch LP	Philips West Africa [Lagos] 13404
1960s	Victor Olaiya & his Cool Cats	Afro-Rhythm Parade Vol. 2	7-inch EP	Philips [Netherlands] 420001
1960s?	Victor Olaiya & his All Stars	Oruku Tiniditindi / Iye Jemila	7-inch 45	Philips [Lagos] 303 015
1960s	Victor Olaiya & his All Stars	Pambotoriboto b/w Moonlight Highlife	7-inch 45	Philips [Lagos] 382357
1960s	Victor Olaiya & his All Stars	Feso J'aiye / Asian Udo	7-inch 45	Philips [Lagos] 382 397
1960s	Victor Olaiya & his All Stars	Kosowo Lode b/w Ewelewekuewele	7-inch 45	Philips [Lagos] 382739
1960s	Victor Olaiya & his All Stars	Afro-Rhythm Parade Vol. 7	7-inch EP	Philips [Lagos] 420014
Late 1960s?	Various Artists	West Africa's Big Sound	7-inch EP	Philips [Lagos] 420023 PE
1982	Dr. Victor Olaiya	In the Sixties	LP	Polydor [Lagos] POLP 066
1982	Dr. Victor Olaiya	Highlife Reincaration	LP	Polydor [Lagos] POLP 073
1983	Dr. Victor Olaiya	Ilu Le O (Country Hard 0!)	LP	Polydor [Lagos] POLP 096
1983	Various Artists	African Music	LP	Vertigo [Netherlands] 814 480-1
1983	E.T. Mensah & Dr. Victor Olaiya	Highlife Giants of Africa Vol. 1	LP	Polydor [Lagos] POLP 102
1986	Dr. Victor Olaiya	Papingo Davalaya	LP	Polydor [Lagos] POLP 156
2001?	Dr. Victor Olaiya	The Best of Dr. Victor Olaiya – 3 Decades of Highlife	CD	Premier Music [Lagos] KMCD003
2003?	Dr. Victor Abimbola Olaiya	Highlife in The 80's – The Best of Dr. Victor Olaiya; Vol. 2 – Evil Genius of Highlife	CD	Premier Music [Lagos] KMCD007
2002?	Various Artists	High Life Kings Vol. 1	CD	Premier Music [Lagos] KMCD 01
2002?	Various Artists	High Life Kings Vol. 2	CD	Premier Music [Lagos] KMCD 02
2003	Various Artists	The Rough Guide to Highlife	CD	World Music Network [UK]
2003?	Various Artists	The Kings of Highlife	CD	Wrasse Records [UK] WRASS 097
2005	Victor Olaiya & his International All Stars / St. Augustine	Let Yourself Go/There Was a Time / Papa de Love	7-inch45	Soundway Records [UK] SNDW 7002
2009	Victor Olaiya's All Stars Soul International	Victor Olaiya's All Stars Soul International	CD	Vampisoul [Spain] VAMPI 107)
2012	Various Artists	The Rough Guide To Psychedelic Africa	CD	World Music Network [UK] RGNET 1270
