= John Watermann =

John Watermann (born February 19, 1935, in Berlin as Johannes Wassermann; died April 2002 in Brisbane, Australia) was a composer, performer and filmmaker.

Much of his musical work incorporated field recordings, which were heavily treated by electronics, resulting in highly rhythmic music, through the extensive use of cut ups.

Watermann is featured in "BNE - The Definitive Archive: Brisbane Independent Electronic Music Production 1979-2014", which is a hardcover book and USB music archive published by Trans:Com in September 2014.

== Discography ==
- Warmth Is The Fifth Room, Nightshift Records (1988)
- Illusions Of Infinite Bliss, Nightshift Records (1989)
- The Dead Calm Of Bashing Coca-Cola, Nightshift Records (1989)
- Ambiguity, Nightshift Records (1990)
- Dummyhead, Nightshift Records (1990)
- Illusions Of Infinite Bliss, Walter Ulbricht Schallfolien (1990)
- Mussolini Beauty Flab, Nightshift Records (1990)
- Ram Slot, Nightshift Records (1990)
- Babel #1, Stille Andacht (1993)
- Calcutta Gas Chamber, N D (1993)
- Halves / Manifesto, E(r)ostrate (1994)
- Brisbane-Tokyo Interlace, Cold Spring (1995)
- Testing The Jammer, Raum 312 (1995)
- Neurotic Jesus Cash Boy, Tochnit Aleph (1999)
- Move Machine With Glass, Gender-Less Kibbutz (2002)
- Split, Hvexas Records (2004)
- Calcutta Gas Chamber, Cold Spring (2006)
- Neurotic Jesus Cash Boy, Waystyx (2006)
- To Be Taken Seriously It Has To Be Long, Waystyx (2006)
- Ambiguity, Alias Frequencies (2007)
- Calcutta Gas Chamber, Die Stadt (2007)
- Dummyhead, Alias Frequencies (2007)
- RAM Slot, Alias Frequencies (2007)
- The Denial Of Cricket, Alias Frequencies (2007)
- These Are Workers, Alias Frequencies (2007)
- To Be Taken Seriously It Has To Be Long, Alias Frequencies (2007)
