= Shango (Peter King album) =

Studio album by Peter King
- Released: 1974
- Length: 44:41
- Label: Mr. Bongo

Peter King chronology
| Shango (1974) | Mikki Sounds (1975) |

Professional ratings
Review scores
| Source | Rating |
|---|---|
| AllMusic | 4.5/5 stars |

Shango is an album by Nigerian afrobeat tenor saxophonist Peter King. It was released in 1974, by Mr Bongo Records.

== Critical reception ==
Thom Jurek of AllMusic explained the release "is a mixture of hard African rhythms, James Brown-styled funk, jazzed-up horn arrangements, and political messages. From the standpoint of the Lagos scene, the album is a classic of the period rivaling virtually anything that Fela or Tony Allen were putting across at the time. With King blowing deep-groove soul and out jazz saxophone solos above the chants, the music becomes a boiling pot of hip-shaking sexiness and rage." Writing for London Jazz News, Andrew Cartmel praised the keyboard work throughout the album by saying that it is "strikingly high standard, perhaps reaching a psychedelic peak on Watusi where it suggests Return to Forever-era Chick Corea."

== Track listing ==
| No. | Title | Length |
|---|---|---|
| 1. | "Shango" | 5:39 |
| 2. | "Prisoner of Law" | 5:40 |
| 3. | "Mr Lonely Wolf" | 6:55 |
| 4. | "Freedom Dance" | 4:10 |
| 5. | "Go Go's Feast" | 7:47 |
| 6. | "Mystery Tour" | 6:19 |
| 7. | "Now I'm a Man" | 3:39 |
| 8. | "Watusi" | 4:39 |
