= Tod Dockstader =

American composer

- Born: March 20, 1932; Saint Paul, Minnesota, US
- Died: February 27, 2015 (aged 82) Arlington, Massachusetts, US
- Genres: Electronic; musique concrète; sound design
- Occupations: Composer, sound engineer
- Years active: 1958-2015

Tod Dockstader (March 20, 1932 – February 27, 2015) was an American electronic music composer and sound designer. He is regarded as one of the first American musique concrète composers.

== Biography ==
Dockstader was born on March 20, 1932, in Saint Paul, Minnesota. In the 1950s, he studied painting and film while at the University of Minnesota before moving to Hollywood to become an apprentice film editor. He moved into work as a sound engineer in 1958, and apprenticed at Gotham Recording Studios, where he first started composing; he also worked for Terrytoons alongside Gene Deitch. From 1961 to 1962, when Deitch directed thirteen new Tom and Jerry shorts, Dockstader was responsible for creating the unusual, heavily reverberated sound effects heard throughout them; he also wrote the shorts Mouse into Space and Landing Stripling.

Dockstader's first album, Eight Electronic Pieces, was released in 1960; segments were later used on the soundtrack to Federico Fellini's 1969 film Fellini Satyricon. He continued to create music throughout the first half of the decade, working principally with tape manipulation effects. In 1966, Owl Records released four albums of his work from this period, including Quatermass. He achieved modest recognition and radio play alongside the likes of Karlheinz Stockhausen, Edgard Varèse, and John Cage.

In 1961, he applied to use the facilities at the Columbia-Princeton Electronic Music Center and was denied access in separate rejection letters penned by Vladimir Ussachevsky and Milton Babbitt. Ussachevsky’s official reason was the “overstrained” schedule of the studios, although it was suspected that Dockstader's lack of academic training was a factor in the decision. After leaving Gotham Recording Studios in the late 1960s, he formed the audio-visual service Westport Communications Group along with former Gotham executive Fred Hertz. The company focused on corporate clients and produced award-winning educational films for the American Heritage series.

Dockstader was also a prolific writer on electronic music, with several articles published by Electronic Music Review and The Musical Quarterly.

In the early 1990s, Starkland re-released most of the content of Dockstader’s out-of-print Owl recordings, alongside previously unreleased material, on two CDs. These releases brought him new, significant acclaim. The Washington Post called Dockstader "a highly imaginative pioneer," and The Wire concluded: "The obsessive care with which Starkland have compiled these extraordinary recordings should ensure that Dockstader will be remembered as the innovative, visionary figure he undoubtedly was." Reinvigorated, Dockstader returned to music at the start of the 21st century, adopting computer composition. New CDs appeared from Sub Rosa and ReR Megacorp.

Work on a documentary about his life, Unlocking Dockstader, was begun in 2011; however,a lack of funding stalled the project.

Dockstader died in Arlington, Massachusetts, on February 27, 2015, at the age of 82.

In 2016, Starkland released From the Archives, a CD that premiered 15 works selected from the unexpected discovery of 4,200 sound files found on Dockstader's private computer after his death. Created from 2000-2008, these were among the last pieces composed by Dockstader, before dementia made his studio work too difficult.

== Influence ==
Alvin Lee of Ten Years After took influence from Dockstader when recording the band's 1969 album Stonedhenge; he said he was in a "musique concrete phase." Classic Rock's Hugh Fielder deemed Dockstader an "avant garde industrial composer".

== Discography ==
- 1961 Eight Electronic Pieces (re-released by Folkways Records in 1968 and Locust Music in 2003)
- 1966 Luna Park, Traveling Music, Apocalypse (Owl Records)
- 1966 Drone, Two Fragments from Apocalypse, Water Music (Owl Records)
- 1966 Quatermass (Owl Records)
- 1966 Omniphony 1 (with James Reichart) (Owl Records)
- 1979 Electronic Vol. 1 (Boosey & Hawkes Library)
- 1981 Electronic Vol. 2 (Boosey & Hawkes Library)
- 1992 Water Music, Two Moons, Quatermass (Starkland)
- 1993 Apocalypse (Starkland)
- 2004 Pond (with David Lee Myers (Arcane Device)) (ReR Megacorp)
- 2005 Bijou (with David Lee Myers) (ReR Megacorp)
- 2005 Aerial #1 (Sub Rosa)
- 2005 Aerial #2 (Sub Rosa)
- 2005 Aerial #3 (Sub Rosa)
- 2016 From The Archives (Starkland)
