= Hugh Davies (artist) =

Australian artist, researcher, and educator

- Born: 1971 (age 54–55)
- Website: www.hughdavies.au

Hugh Davies (born 1971), is an Australian media arts practitioner, researcher and educator.

Trained at the Victorian College of the Arts (1997 to 1999) and Copenhagen Technical Academy (2003 to 2005), Davies has participated in exhibitions and festivals both independently, and as founder of the collaborative arts project Analogue Art Map.

While employed at the Australian Broadcasting Corporation, Davies won an Australian Teachers of Media ATOM Award in 2008.

As an academic, he has held lecturing positions at the Adelaide Centre for the Arts, University of South Australia, RMIT and La Trobe University where he managed the Centre for Creative Arts. In 2014, Hugh completed a PhD at Monash University in transmedia gaming.

He has served on the board of the Australian Network for Art and Technology and was inaugural Board Chair of the Freeplay Independent Gaming Festival.
