= Mike and the Mechanics discography =

- Studio albums: 9
- Compilation albums: 4
- Singles: 35
- Video albums: 1

This is the discography of the British band Mike and the Mechanics. They have released nine studio albums, four compilation albums, more than thirty singles, and one concert video.

== Albums ==
=== Studio albums ===
Title	Details	Peak chart positions					Certifications (sales threshold)
Title	Details	UK	AUS	CAN	GER	US	Certifications (sales threshold)
Mike + The Mechanics	Release date: 21 October 1985; UK label: WEA; US label: Atlantic; Formats: CD, LP, cassette	78	36	10	26	26	RIAA: Gold
Living Years	Release date: 24 October 1988; UK label: WEA; US label: Atlantic; Formats: CD, LP, cassette	2	10	12	16	13	BPI: Gold; ARIA: Platinum; MC: Gold; RIAA: Gold
Word of Mouth	Release date: 2 April 1991; UK label: Virgin; US label: Atlantic; Formats: CD, LP, cassette	11	55	24	22	107	BPI: Silver
Beggar on a Beach of Gold	Release date: 6 March 1995; UK label: Virgin; US label: Atlantic; Formats: CD, cassette	9	139	—	21	—	BPI: Gold
Mike & The Mechanics (aka M6)	Release date: 31 May 1999; Label: Virgin; Formats: CD, cassette	14	—	—	9	—	
Rewired	Release date: 7 June 2004; UK label: Virgin; US label: Rhino; Formats: CD	61	—	—	39	—	
The Road	Release date: 18 April 2011; UK label: Sony Music; US label: Arista; Formats: CD	42	—	—	41	—	
Let Me Fly	Release date: 7 April 2017; Label: BMG; Formats: CD, LP, download	9	—	—	51	—	
Out of the Blue	Release date: 5 April 2019; Label: BMG; Formats: CD, LP, download	7	—	—	40	—	

=== Compilation albums ===
Title	Details	Peak chart positions			Certifications (sales threshold)
Title	Details	UK	AUS	GER	Certifications (sales threshold)
Hits	Release date: 4 March 1996; UK label: Virgin; US label: Atlantic / Rhino; Formats: CD, MD, cassette	3	139	6	BPI: 2× Platinum; BVMI: Gold
Rewired + Hits: The Latest + The Greatest	Release date: 6 September 2004; Label: Virgin; Formats: CD	42	—	—	
The Singles 1985–2014	Release date: 20 January 2014; Label: Virgin / Universal Music Catalogue; Formats: CD	18	—	80	
Looking Back – Living The Years	Release date: 14 March 2025; Label: Craft Recordings; Formats: CD, Vinyl	—	—	96	

== Singles ==
Year	Single	Peak chart positions								Certifications (sales thresholds)	Album
Year	Single	UK	AUS	CAN	GER	IRE	NL	NZ	US	Certifications (sales thresholds)	Album
1985	"Silent Running (On Dangerous Ground)"	21	23	8	8	21	39	—	6		Mike + The Mechanics
1986	"All I Need Is a Miracle"	53	8	10	26	1	—	31	5		Mike + The Mechanics
1986	"Taken In"	—	—	39	—	—	—	—	32		Mike + The Mechanics
1986	"Hanging by a Thread"	—	—	—	—	—	—	—	—		Mike + The Mechanics
1988	"Nobody's Perfect"	80	29	30	—	—	—	—	63		Living Years
1988	"The Living Years"	2	1	1	13	1	20	11	1	BPI: Gold; ARIA: Platinum; RMNZ: Platinum	Living Years
1989	"Nobody Knows"	81	—	—	—	20	—	—	—		Living Years
1989	"Seeing Is Believing"	—	88	46	—	—	—	—	62		Living Years
1989	"Revolution"	—	—	82	—	—	—	—	—		Rude Awakening: Original Motion Picture Soundtrack
1991	"Word of Mouth"	13	33	36	27	19	13	—	78		Word of Mouth
1991	"A Time and Place"	58	—	—	—	—	—	—	—		Word of Mouth
1991	"Get Up"	—	150	—	—	—	—	—	—		Word of Mouth
1991	"Stop Baby"	79	—	—	—	—	—	—	—		Word of Mouth
1991	"Everybody Gets a Second Chance"	56	—	21	51	—	—	—	—		Word of Mouth
1995	"Over My Shoulder"	12	118	22	44	26	—	—	—	BPI: Gold; RMNZ: Gold	Beggar on a Beach of Gold
1995	"A Beggar on a Beach of Gold"	33	—	—	64	—	—	—	—		Beggar on a Beach of Gold
1995	"Mea Culpa"	—	—	41	—	—	—	—	—		Beggar on a Beach of Gold
1995	"Another Cup of Coffee"	51	151	53	61	—	—	—	—		Beggar on a Beach of Gold
1996	"All I Need Is a Miracle '96"	27	—	—	81	—	—	—	—		Hits
1996	"Silent Running '96"	61	—	—	—	—	—	—	—		Hits
1999	"Now That You've Gone"	35	—	—	64	—	—	—	—		M6
1999	"Whenever I Stop"	73	—	—	76	—	—	—	—		M6
1999	"All the Light I Need"	—	—	—	—	—	—	—	—		M6
2004	"One Left Standing"	—	—	—	—	—	—	—	—		Rewired
2004	"If I Were You"	—	—	—	—	—	—	—	—		Rewired
2004	"Perfect Child"	—	—	—	—	—	—	—	—		Rewired
2011	"Reach Out (Touch the Sun)"	—	—	—	—	—	—	—	—		The Road
2011	"Try to Save Me"	—	—	—	—	—	—	—	—		The Road
2017	"Don't Know What Came Over Me"	—	—	—	—	—	—	—	—		Let Me Fly
2017	"The Best Is Yet to Come"	—	—	—	—	—	—	—	—		Let Me Fly
2019	"Out of the Blue"	—	—	—	—	—	—	—	—		Out of the Blue
2019	"What Would You Do"	—	—	—	—	—	—	—	—		Out of the Blue
2019	"Over My Shoulder" (2019 Version)	—	—	—	—	—	—	—	—		Out of the Blue
2019	"The Living Years" (Acoustic)	—	—	—	—	—	—	—	—		Out of the Blue

== Other appearances ==
Year	Song	Album
1990	"Ain't That Peculiar" (Performed live alongside Paul Shaffer and the World's Most Dangerous Band on April 6, 1989, on Late Night with David Letterman)	Nobody's Child: Romanian Angel Appeal
1994	"The Living Years" (live version)	Grammy's Greatest Moments Volume III
2014	"Silent Running (On Dangerous Ground)", "The Living Years", "Over My Shoulder"	Genesis R-Kive

== Videos ==
Title	Details
Mike + The Mechanics + Paul Carrack Live at Shepherds Bush London	Release date: 8 March 2005; Label: Eagle Vision; Formats: DVD, Blu-ray
