= Hits (Mike + The Mechanics album) =

Greatest hits album by Mike + The Mechanics
- Released: 4 March 1996
- Recorded: 1985–96
- Length: 60:36
- Label: Rhino/Atlantic, Virgin
- Producer: Mike Rutherford, Christopher Neil, Russ Titelman

Mike + The Mechanics chronology
Beggar on a Beach of Gold (1995)	Hits (1996)	Mike & The Mechanics (1999)

Hits is a compilation album by Mike + The Mechanics, released in 1996 except in the United States and Canada, where it was released in 2005. It contains nearly all of the band's hits up to the time of its release. "All I Need Is a Miracle" was re-recorded for the album.

In September 2004 the album was repackaged as a double CD with the band's 2004 album Rewired as Rewired + Hits. The cover is a close up of part of the Rewired cover overlaid with both album covers side by side.

== Reception ==
Professional ratings
Review scores
Source	Rating
AllMusic	4/5 stars
Q	4/5 stars

Peter Kane in Q wrote, "These are all songs that are uniformly high on melody and craftsmanship, with mercifully no hidden agenda." In a retrospective review, AllMusic editor Stephen Thomas Erlewine declared Hits "a first-rate compilation, giving the casual fan all of the essential Mike + the Mechanics tracks".

== Track listing ==
No.	Title	Writer(s)	Original album	Length
1.	"All I Need Is a Miracle '96" (Re-recorded version)	Mike Rutherford, Christopher Neil	Mike + The Mechanics (1985)	5:42
2.	"Over My Shoulder"	Rutherford, Paul Carrack	Beggar on a Beach of Gold (1995)	3:37
3.	"Word of Mouth"	Rutherford, Neil	Word of Mouth (1991)	3:57
4.	"The Living Years"	Rutherford, Robertson	Living Years (1988)	5:35
5.	"Another Cup of Coffee"	Rutherford, Neil	Beggar on a Beach of Gold (1995)	4:21
6.	"Nobody's Perfect"	Rutherford, Robertson	Living Years (1988)	4:43
7.	"Silent Running"	Rutherford, Robertson	Mike + The Mechanics (1985)	6:13
8.	"Nobody Knows"	Rutherford, Neil	Living Years (1988)	4:25
9.	"Get Up"	Rutherford, Carrack	Word of Mouth (1991)	4:26
10.	"A Time and Place"	Rutherford, Robertson	Word of Mouth (1991)	4:52
11.	"Taken In"	Rutherford, Neil	Mike + The Mechanics (1985)	4:22
12.	"Everybody Gets a Second Chance"	Rutherford, Robertson	Word of Mouth (1991)	3:59
13.	"A Beggar on a Beach of Gold"	Rutherford, Robertson	Beggar on a Beach of Gold (1995)	4:32

== Charts ==
Chart (1996)	Peak position
Australian Albums (ARIA)	139
Austrian Albums (Ö3 Austria)	41
German Albums (Offizielle Top 100)	6
New Zealand Albums (RMNZ)	27
Norwegian Albums (VG-lista)	10
Scottish Albums (OCC)	3
Swedish Albums (Sverigetopplistan)	19
Swiss Albums (Schweizer Hitparade)	15
UK Albums (OCC)	3

== Certifications ==
Region	Certification	Certified units/sales
Germany (BVMI)	Gold	250,000^{^}
United Kingdom (BPI)	2× Platinum	600,000^{^}
^{^} Shipments figures based on certification alone.
