= R-Kive =

Box set by Genesis
- Released: 22 September 2014 (UK); 29 September 2014 (Worldwide)
- Recorded: 1970–2012
- Genres: Progressive rock, pop rock
- Length: 214:05
- Labels: Rhino/Atlantic Records (US/Canada); Virgin EMI Records/UMC (rest of the world)
- Producers: Genesis, Nick Davis, Hugh Padgham, David Hentschel, John Burns, David Hitchcock, John Anthony, Chris Neil, Rob Cavallo

Genesis chronology
Genesis Movie Box 1981–2007 (2009)	R-Kive (2014)	The Last Domino? – The Hits (2021)

R-Kive is a CD box set by English veteran progressive rock band Genesis. It was released on 22 September 2014 in the UK, and on 29 September 2014 in the U.S.

It consists of three CDs that span Genesis' career in chronological order. Besides Genesis songs, it includes tracks from solo albums and other projects from members Peter Gabriel, Steve Hackett, Tony Banks, Mike Rutherford, and Phil Collins.

== Background ==
The compilation was intended as a companion to the BBC documentary Genesis: Together and Apart, broadcast in October 2014. The documentary, like the compilation, also features solo efforts as well as the band. The documentary was released in late October 2014 on DVD and Blu-ray under the title of Genesis: Sum of the Parts.

== Track listing ==
Disc one
No.	Title	Writer(s)	Original record	Length
1.	"The Knife" (Genesis)	Banks, Gabriel, Phillips, Rutherford	Trespass (1970)	8:54
2.	"The Musical Box" (Genesis)	Banks, Collins, Gabriel, Hackett, Rutherford	Nursery Cryme (1971)	10:25
3.	"Supper's Ready" (Genesis)	Banks, Collins, Gabriel, Hackett, Rutherford	Foxtrot (1972)	23:04
4.	"The Cinema Show" (Genesis)	Banks, Collins, Gabriel, Hackett, Rutherford	Selling England by the Pound (1973)	10:50
5.	"I Know What I Like (In Your Wardrobe)" (Genesis)	Banks, Collins, Gabriel, Hackett, Rutherford	Selling England by the Pound	4:09
6.	"The Lamb Lies Down on Broadway" (Genesis)	Banks, Collins, Gabriel, Hackett, Rutherford	The Lamb Lies Down on Broadway (1974)	4:54
7.	"Back in N.Y.C." (Genesis)	Banks, Collins, Gabriel, Hackett, Rutherford	The Lamb Lies Down on Broadway	5:39
8.	"The Carpet Crawlers" (Genesis)	Banks, Collins, Gabriel, Hackett, Rutherford	The Lamb Lies Down on Broadway	5:15
9.	"Ace of Wands" (Steve Hackett)	Hackett	Voyage of the Acolyte (1975)	5:24

Disc two
No.	Title	Writer(s)	Original record	Length
1.	"Ripples" (Genesis)	Banks, Rutherford	A Trick of the Tail (1976)	8:04
2.	"Afterglow" (Genesis)	Banks	Wind & Wuthering (1977)	4:11
3.	"Solsbury Hill" (Peter Gabriel)	Gabriel	Peter Gabriel (1977)	4:23
4.	"Follow You Follow Me" (Genesis)	Banks, Collins, Rutherford	...And Then There Were Three... (1978)	4:00
5.	"For a While" (Tony Banks)	Banks	A Curious Feeling (1979)	3:39
6.	"Every Day" (Steve Hackett)	Hackett	Spectral Mornings (1979)	6:11
7.	"Biko" (Peter Gabriel)	Gabriel	Peter Gabriel (1980)	7:28
8.	"Turn It On Again" (Genesis)	Banks, Collins, Rutherford	Duke (1980)	3:51
9.	"In the Air Tonight" (Phil Collins)	Collins	Face Value (1981)	5:30
10.	"Abacab" (Genesis)	Banks, Collins, Rutherford	Abacab (1981)	7:01
11.	"Mama" (Genesis)	Banks, Collins, Rutherford	Genesis (1983)	6:48
12.	"That's All" (Genesis)	Banks, Collins, Rutherford	Genesis	4:25
13.	"Easy Lover" (Phil Collins & Philip Bailey)	Collins, Philip Bailey, Nathan East	Chinese Wall (1984)	5:02
14.	"Silent Running (On Dangerous Ground)" (Mike + The Mechanics)	Rutherford, B. A. Robertson	Mike + The Mechanics (1985)	5:47

Disc three
No.	Title	Writer(s)	Original record	Length
1.	"Invisible Touch" (Genesis)	Banks, Collins, Rutherford	Invisible Touch (1986)	3:29
2.	"Land of Confusion" (Genesis)	Banks, Collins, Rutherford	Invisible Touch	4:46
3.	"Tonight, Tonight, Tonight" (Genesis)	Banks, Collins, Rutherford	Invisible Touch	8:52
4.	"The Living Years" (Mike + The Mechanics)	Rutherford, B. A. Robertson	Living Years (1988)	5:24
5.	"Red Day on Blue Street" (Tony Banks)	Banks, Nik Kershaw	Still (1991)	5:50
6.	"I Can't Dance" (Genesis)	Banks, Collins, Rutherford	We Can't Dance (1991)	4:01
7.	"No Son of Mine" (Genesis)	Banks, Collins, Rutherford	We Can't Dance	6:39
8.	"Hold on My Heart" (Genesis)	Banks, Collins, Rutherford	We Can't Dance	4:36
9.	"Over My Shoulder" (Mike + The Mechanics)	Rutherford, Paul Carrack	Beggar on a Beach of Gold (1995)	3:35
10.	"Calling All Stations" (Genesis)	Banks, Rutherford	Calling All Stations (1997)	5:46
11.	"Signal to Noise" (Peter Gabriel)	Gabriel	Up (2002)	7:32
12.	"Wake Up Call" (Phil Collins)	Collins	Testify (2002)	5:14
13.	"Nomads" (Steve Hackett)	Hackett, Jo Lehmann	Out of the Tunnel's Mouth (2009)	4:39
14.	"Siren" (Tony Banks)	Banks	Six Pieces for Orchestra (2012)	8:49

== Charts ==
Chart (2014)	Peak position
Belgian Albums (Ultratop Flanders)	42
Belgian Albums (Ultratop Wallonia)	10
Dutch Albums (Album Top 100)	12
Czech Albums (ČNS IFPI)	67
French Albums (SNEP)	39
German Albums (Offizielle Top 100)	23
Ireland Albums (IRMA)	56
Italian Albums (FIMI)	26
Scottish Albums (OCC)	10
Swiss Albums (Schweizer Hitparade)	82
UK Albums (Official Charts)	7
UK Rock & Metal Albums (Official Charts)	1

== Certifications ==
Region	Certification	Certified units/sales
United Kingdom (BPI)	Silver	60,000^{‡}
^{‡} Sales+streaming figures based on certification alone.
