= Out of the Blue (Mike + The Mechanics album) =

Studio album by Mike + The Mechanics
- Released: 5 April 2019
- Recorded: 2018–19
- Studio: The Farm and Drungewick Studios
- Genre: Pop rock
- Label: BMG
- Producer: Paul Meehan; Mike Rutherford

Mike + The Mechanics chronology
Silent Running: The Masters Collection (2018)	Out of the Blue (2019)

Singles from Out of the Blue
- 1. "Out of the Blue" Released: 20 February 2019; 2. "What Would You Do" Released: 8 March 2019; 3. "Over My Shoulder" Released: 22 March 2019; 4. "The Living Years (acoustic)" Released: 29 March 2019

Out of the Blue is the ninth studio album by English pop rock group Mike + The Mechanics that was released on 5 April 2019 by BMG. The album features reworkings of some of their greatest hits along with three new tracks ("One Way", "Out of the Blue", and "What Would You Do").

The album debuted at number 7 on the UK Albums Chart, selling 7,591 copies in the first week. It is Mike + The Mechanics' fifth top 10 album in the United Kingdom.

== Track listing ==
No.	Title	Writer(s)	Length
1.	"One Way"	Andrew Roachford; Mike Rutherford; Clark Datchler	4:00
2.	"Out of the Blue"	Roachford; Rutherford; Datchler	3:38
3.	"What Would You Do"	Roachford; Rutherford; Datchler	3:06
4.	"The Living Years"	Rutherford; BA Robertson	6:24
5.	"Beggar on a Beach of Gold"	Rutherford; Robertson	4:09
6.	"Get Up"	Rutherford; Paul Carrack	4:20
7.	"Another Cup of Coffee"	Rutherford; Christopher Neil	4:25
8.	"All I Need Is a Miracle"	Rutherford; Neil	6:38
9.	"Silent Running"	Rutherford; Robertson	4:55
10.	"Over My Shoulder"	Rutherford; Carrack	4:56
11.	"Word of Mouth"	Rutherford; Neil	4:03
12.	"Don't Know What Came Over Me" (acoustic)	Rutherford; Datchler; Roachford	3:59
13.	"The Best Is Yet to Come" (acoustic)	Rutherford; Datchler	4:19
14.	"The Living Years" (acoustic)	Rutherford; Robertson	5:32
15.	"Beggar on a Beach of Gold" (acoustic)	Rutherford; Robertson	3:54
16.	"Another Cup of Coffee" (acoustic)	Rutherford; Neil	4:39
17.	"Over My Shoulder" (acoustic)	Rutherford; Carrack	3:45

== Personnel ==
Mike & the Mechanics

- Mike Rutherford – bass, drum programming
- Tim Howar – vocals
- Andrew Roachford – vocals, keyboards
- Luke Juby – keyboards, backing vocals, whistler (10)
- Anthony Drennan – lead guitar, bass
- Gary Wallis – drums

Additional musicians

- Paul Meehan – keyboards (1, 2), programming (1, 2)
- Clark Datchler – keyboards (3)

== Production ==
- Paul Meehan – producer
- Mike Rutherford – producer, mixing, artwork concept, design
- Harry Rutherford – recording
- Nick Davis – mixing
- Dick Beetham (360 Mastering) – mastering
- Jo Greenwood – project coordinator
- Darren Evans – artwork concept, design
- Martin Griffin – digital imagery
- Patrick "Paddy" Balls – photography

== Charts ==
Chart (2019)	Peak position
German Albums (Offizielle Top 100)	40
Scottish Albums (OCC)	5
Swiss Albums (Schweizer Hitparade)	35
UK Albums (OCC)	7
UK Independent Albums (OCC)	1
