= Now That You've Gone (Mike and the Mechanics song) =

Single by Mike & The Mechanics

from the album M6
- B-side: "I Believe (When I Fall In Love It Will Be Forever)"; "Word of Mouth"
- Released: 17 May 1999
- Studio: Dreamhouse Studios
- Genre: Dance-pop
- Length: 3:51
- Label: Virgin
- Songwriters: Mike Rutherford; Paul Carrack
- Producers: Brian Rawling; Mark Taylor

Mike & The Mechanics singles chronology
"Over My Shoulder" (1995)	"Now That You've Gone" (1999)	"Whenever I Stop" (1999)

Music video
- "Now That You've Gone" on YouTube

"Now That You've Gone" is a song recorded by English rock group Mike & The Mechanics and released in 1999, by Virgin Records, as the first single from their fifth studio album, M6 (1999). It is written by group members Mike Rutherford and Paul Carrack, and produced by British producers Brian Rawling and Mark Taylor), who had produced Cher's "Believe" in 1998. In the UK, "Now That You've Gone" became a top-40 hit, peaking at number 35 on the UK Singles Chart. It also charted in other countries, like Estonia, Finland, Germany and Latvia.

== Background ==
"Now That You've Gone" was viewed as a wild card as the lead single of the M6 album. Featuring drum machine beats and vocoder effects, the modern-sounding pop song raised more than a few eyebrows upon release. But as a one off it proved to be a strong track which would also became an even better live number for the group. Rutherford of Mike & The Mechanics told about the song, "It began life as any normal Mechanics song. But I gave these guys (Mark Taylor and Brian Rawling of Cher - 'I Believe' fame) the original tapes, and they did something different with it, which was good for the band".

== Critical reception ==
British Birmingham Post named the song a radio-friendly cut. A reviewer from Music Week wrote, "Mike Rutherford has taken a leaf out of fellow veteran Cher's book to boost the fortunes of Mike & The Mechanics. Mark Taylor and Brian Rawling, who worked on the mega hit 'Believe', have been brought in to produce this Paul Carrack-fronted song to add a similar dance-style edge to the group's usual AOR sound. Lifted by the catchiness of the song itself, this unlikely marriage actually works."

== Track listings ==
- CD single, Europe (1999)
1. "Now That You've Gone" (Radio Edit) — 3:51
2. "Now That You've Gone" — 4:33
- CD single, Europe (1999)
1. "Now That You've Gone" (Radio Edit) — 3:51
2. "A Beggar on a Beach of Gold" — 4:58
3. "Silent Running" — 6:17
- CD single, UK (1999)
1. "Now That You've Gone" — 4:33
2. "I Believe (When I Fall In Love It Will Be Forever)" — 3:40
3. "Word of Mouth" — 6:53
- Cassette single, Europe (1999)
1. "Now That You've Gone" (Radio Edit) — 3:51
2. "Word of Mouth" (Live) — 6:50
3. "A Beggar on a Beach of Gold" (Live) — 4:58

== Charts ==
=== Weekly charts ===
Chart (1999)	Peak position
Estonia (Eesti Top 20)	9
Europe (Eurochart Hot 100)	99
Europe (European Radio Top 50)	19
Finland (Suomen virallinen lista)	11
Latvia (Latvijas Top 50)	20
Scotland Singles (Official Charts)	54
UK Singles (Official Charts)	35
UK Airplay (Music Week)	32

=== Year-end charts ===
Chart (1999)	Position
Latvia (Latvijas Top 50)	154
