= Yvonne Wright =

American songwriter (1951–2016)

Background information
- Born: Yvonne Lowrene Wright; October 31, 1951; Harlem, New York City, U.S.
- Died: January 26, 2016 (aged 64) Dallas, Texas, U.S.
- Genres: R&B; soul
- Occupations: Songwriter; singer
- Instrument: Vocals
- Years active: 1970s–1980s

Yvonne Lowrene Wright (October 31, 1951 – January 26, 2016) was an American songwriter and vocalist best known for co-writing with Stevie Wonder in the 1970s. Their songs appear on the albums Music of My Mind, Talking Book, Fulfillingness' First Finale, and Stevie Wonder's Journey Through "The Secret Life of Plants".

She is not related to singer-songwriter Syreeta Wright, who also worked with, and was married to, Wonder.

== Biography ==
Yvonne Lowrene Wright-Willis was born in Harlem, New York City, United States, to Harry Wright and Margaret Williams in 1951. Wright's mother Margaret was briefly a member of the dance troupe, Whitey's Lindy Hoppers.

As a child Wright sang in her church choir, where she and her older sister Adele were given solos on songs such as James Cleveland's "Two Wings". As a teen Wright and her friends formed vocal groups the Diamonds and the Velveteens. While still a teenager, she performed "Moon River" at Amateur Night at the Apollo Theater and was enlisted to sing background for Wilson Pickett on that same stage.

Always a prolific writer, she met Stevie Wonder in the early 1970s and collaborated on six songs over four albums from 1972 to 1979. Their 1972 song "You've Got It Bad Girl" was the B-side to the number 1 single "Superstition". "They Won't Go When I Go" (1974) appeared on the number 1 album Fulfillingness' First Finale, which was named Grammy Album of the Year. In 1974 Jet magazine described Wright as Wonder's "girl friend". Their songs have been covered by many artists including Art Garfunkel, George Michael, Herbie Hancock, Michael McDonald, and Josh Groban.

Wright also sang background vocals on Minnie Riperton's "The Edge of a Dream", from Riperton's 1974 breakthrough album Perfect Angel, produced by Wonder.

Wright continued to sing live in the 1970s and early 1980s. In 1975, she performed in a touring production of Hair in Spain. She sang background vocals for Lou Rawls and Millie Jackson. She was a featured vocalist in touring line-ups for the Chantels and the Marvelettes, as well as on numerous recordings.

Later in life she returned to study in Dallas, Texas, and earned a BSc and her MS in Special Education.

== Selective discography as songwriter ==
All songs written by Stevie Wonder and Yvonne Wright.

=== Singles ===
Year	Song title	Artist	Singles chart	Notes
1972	"You've Got It Bad Girl" (B-side)	Stevie Wonder	US #1, UK #11	B-side to "Superstition"
1973	"Girl Blue"	The Main Ingredient	US #119	Single from Afrodisiac
1975	"I Believe (When I Fall in Love It Will Be Forever)"	Art Garfunkel	UK #51	UK single from Breakaway
1979	"Black Orchid"	Stevie Wonder	UK #63	Single from The Secret Life of Plants
1982	"Black Orchid" (B-side)	Stevie Wonder	US #54, UK #45	B-side to "Ribbon in the Sky"
1991	"I Believe (When I Fall in Love It Will Be Forever)" (live) (B-side)	George Michael	US #1, UK #1	B-side to "Don't Let the Sun Go Down on Me" (live duet with Elton John)
1994	"I Believe"	E'voke	UK #77	Debut single
1999	"I Believe (When I Fall in Love It Will Be Forever)" (live) (B-side)	Mike + The Mechanics	UK #35	B-side to "Now That You've Gone"

=== Album tracks ===
Year	Song title	Artist	Albums Chart	Notes
1972	"Girl Blue"	Stevie Wonder	US #21	From Music of My Mind
1972	"You've Got It Bad Girl" "I Believe (When I Fall in Love It Will Be Forever)"	Stevie Wonder	US #3, UK #16	From Talking Book
1973	"You've Got It Bad Girl"	Quincy Jones	US #1 Jazz	Title track from You've Got It Bad Girl
1974	"They Won't Go When I Go"	Stevie Wonder	US #1	From Fulfillingness' First Finale, Grammy Album of the Year
1975	"I Believe (When I Fall in Love It Will Be Forever)"	Art Garfunkel	US #7, UK #7,	From Breakaway
1979	"Black Orchid"	Stevie Wonder	US #4, UK #8,	From The Secret Life of Plants
1984	"I Believe (When I Fall in Love It Will Be Forever)"	Art Garfunkel	UK #12	From The Art Garfunkel Album
1990	"They Won't Go When I Go"	George Michael	US #2, UK #1	From Listen Without Prejudice Vol. 1
1993	"Girl Blue"	Nnenna Freelon	US #10 Jazz	From Heritage
1995	"I Believe (When I Fall in Love It Will Be Forever)"	Mike + The Mechanics	UK #9	From Beggar on a Beach of Gold
1996	"You've Got It Bad Girl"	Herbie Hancock	US #5 Jazz	From The New Standard
2003	"I Believe (When I Fall in Love It Will Be Forever)"	Michael McDonald	US #14	From Motown
2012	"You've Got It Bad Girl" "I Believe (When I Fall in Love It Will Be Forever)"	Macy Gray	US #65	From Talking Book
2013	"I Believe (When I Fall in Love It Will Be Forever)"	Josh Groban	US #1; UK #9	From All That Echoes
