= Nobody's Perfect (Mike + The Mechanics song) =

Single by Mike + The Mechanics

from the album Living Years
- B-side: "Nobody Knows"
- Released: 17 October 1988
- Length: 4:48
- Label: Atlantic, WEA
- Songwriters: BA Robertson, Mike Rutherford
- Producers: Christopher Neil, Mike Rutherford

Mike + The Mechanics singles chronology
"Hanging by a Thread" (1986)	"Nobody's Perfect" (1988)	"Living Years" (1988)

"Nobody's Perfect" is a song written by BA Robertson and Mike Rutherford, and recorded by Rutherford's rock band Mike + The Mechanics. It was released in October 1988 as the first single from their album Living Years. The single reached the singles chart in several countries, including Australia, Canada, the United Kingdom, and the United Kingdom.

A music video for the song was directed by Jim Yukich and depicts the band performing in a stock exchange.

== Release ==
In the United Kingdom, "Nobody's Perfect" was released by WEA on 17 October 1988, with all editions coming in a picture sleeve and featuring "Nobody Knows" as the B-side. The twelve-inch single also included "All I Need Is a Miracle" as an additional B-side. The following month, "Nobody's Perfect" peaked at No. 80 on the UK singles chart during its third and final week on the listing.

During the week of 28 October 1988, Radio & Records reported that 90 album oriented rock stations in the United States had added the song to their playlists. By the following week, 76% of radio stations in that format had included the song in their rotation. It later went on to peak at No. 3 on the Billboard Album Rock Tracks chart.

Billboard listed "Nobody's Perfect" as the fifth most-added song to US contemporary hit radio stations during the week of 5 November 1988. The single later peaked at No. 63 on the Billboard Hot 100; the band's follow-up single, "The Living Years", would reach No. 1 on the same chart.

== Critical reception ==
Cashbox characterised "Nobody's Perfect" as "heavily structured, starting with sampled strikes under the vocal, going into a pop-ish, hooky chorus." Music & Media likened the intro to the work of Trevor Horn and felt that the remainder of the track was "keyboard dominated...with a melodic chorus". The Gavin Report believed that the intro resembled "broken glass", saying that it later transitioned "into a polished pop pattern that is pleasing and radio friendly", ultimately concluding that it would be a "radio shoo-in".

== Charts ==
Chart (1988–1989)	Peak position
Australia (ARIA)	29
Canada Top 100 (RPM)	30
UK Singles (OCC)	80
US Hot 100 (Billboard)	63
US Album Rock Tracks (Billboard)	3
