= Genesis: Together and Apart =

- Directed by: John Edginton
- Produced by: Andrew Winter
- Starring: Phil Collins * Peter Gabriel * Tony Banks * Mike Rutherford * Steve Hackett
- Distributed by: BBC
- Release date: 17 November 2014
- Running time: 90 minutes (TV)

Genesis: Together and Apart is a 2014 British documentary about the English rock band Genesis and its members' solo projects. Made by the BBC, it was first broadcast on BBC Two in the UK on 4 October 2014. It features contributions from drummer and singer Phil Collins, keyboardist Tony Banks, and guitarist and bassist Mike Rutherford, as well as former singer Peter Gabriel and guitarist Steve Hackett, who left the band in the 1970s.

The documentary was released on DVD and Blu-ray in November 2014 as Genesis: Sum of the Parts. The companion box set R-Kive also features tracks from the band member's solo albums.

== Production ==
According to Tony Banks, the first cut of the documentary was "terrible" and a new director was quickly hired to recut it, which improved it, but he said that "things were in there that shouldn't have been" and "overall the thing didn't do its job", adding that there had been better documentaries made on the band previously.

== Reception ==
The Daily Telegraph's reviewer Ceri Radford described the documentary as "excellent" and "an entertaining riff on their success over the years". Writing for The Arts Desk, Adam Sweeting was not as impressed, stating: "All of the group's serpentine twists and turns were dutifully recorded in this 90-minute documentary", but he concluded: "It's an awesome tale in its way, yet the endless list of hit records and enormous tours eventually became tedious, and somehow Genesis managed to remain untouched by all the history going on around them."

Following its broadcast, Hackett expressed his displeasure, describing the documentary as a "biased account of Genesis history" that "totally ignores" his solo work. "I tend to agree with him," remarked Rutherford. "I emailed him to say that. But it wasn't our fault; we weren't entirely in charge [of the editing]." Hackett's screentime was also noticeably minimal and his fans were mostly supportive of his complaint, posting hundreds of comments hailing his music and career.

The documentary was also criticised by some fans as it features no mention of Ray Wilson's three-year tenure with the band, and also very little information on Selling England by the Pound (1973) and Wind & Wuthering (1976) – both very popular among fans – along with several other aspects of the band's history.
