= Beggar on a Beach of Gold =

Studio album by Mike + The Mechanics
- Released: 6 March 1995
- Recorded: 1994–1995
- Genre: Rock
- Length: 60:24
- Labels: Atlantic; Virgin
- Producers: Mike Rutherford; Christopher Neil

Mike + The Mechanics chronology
Word of Mouth (1991)	Beggar on a Beach of Gold (1995)	Hits (1996)

Singles from Beggar on a Beach of Gold
- 1. "Over My Shoulder" Released: 13 February 1995; 2. "A Beggar on a Beach of Gold" Released: 5 June 1995; 3. "Another Cup of Coffee" Released: 21 August 1995

Professional ratings
Review scores
Source	Rating
AllMusic	3.5/5 stars
Entertainment Weekly	B
Knoxville News Sentinel	2/5 stars

Beggar on a Beach of Gold is the fourth album by Mike + the Mechanics, released on 6 March 1995. The album contains three singles: the UK No. 12 hit "Over My Shoulder", the No. 33 hit "A Beggar on a Beach of Gold", and the No. 51 single "Another Cup of Coffee". All three songs charted in Germany as well, and "Another Cup of Coffee" was also popular in Russia; "Over My Shoulder" was particularly successful in France, reaching No. 9. The album was certified Gold by the BPI for sales of 100,000 copies. Adrian Lee performed on this album as a session musician following his departure from the band, and this was drummer Peter Van Hooke's last album as an official member of the band as he left shortly after the album's release.

== Track listing ==
No.	Title	Writer(s)	Length
1.	"A Beggar on a Beach of Gold"	BA Robertson, Mike Rutherford	4:35
2.	"Another Cup of Coffee"	Christopher Neil, Rutherford	4:42
3.	"You've Really Got a Hold on Me" (The Miracles cover)	Smokey Robinson	3:29
4.	"Mea Culpa"	Neil, Rutherford	6:20
5.	"Over My Shoulder"	Paul Carrack, Rutherford	3:37
6.	"Someone Always Hates Someone"	Neil, Rutherford	3:42
7.	"The Ghost of Sex and You"	Robertson, Rutherford	6:24
8.	"Web of Lies"	Carrack, Rutherford	5:38
9.	"Plain and Simple"	Robertson, Rutherford	3:59
10.	"Something to Believe In"	Neil, Rutherford	4:18
11.	"A House of Many Rooms"	Robertson, Rutherford	5:39
12.	"I Believe (When I Fall in Love It Will Be Forever)" (Stevie Wonder cover)	Stevie Wonder, Yvonne Wright	3:11
13.	"Going, Going... Home"	Neil, Rutherford	4:30
Total length:			60:24

== Personnel ==
Mike + The Mechanics

- Mike Rutherford – keyboards, electric and acoustic guitars, bass guitar, backing vocals
- Paul Carrack – lead vocals (2, 3, 5, 7, 8, 11, 12), keyboards, backing vocals
- Paul Young – lead vocals (1, 3, 4, 6, 9, 10, 13), electric rhythm guitar, backing vocals
- Peter Van Hooke – drums

Additional personnel

- Adrian Lee – keyboards
- BA Robertson – keyboards
- Paul "Wix" Wickens – keyboards
- Dale Newman – programming
- Clem Clempson – electric rhythm guitar, electric guitar
- Gary Wallis – drums
- David Frangioni – drum loop programming (3)
- Rich Mendelson – drum loop programming (3)
- Andy Newmark – drums (12)
- Pete Beachill – brass arrangements (13)
- Katie Kissoon – backing vocals (5)
- Tessa Niles – backing vocals (5)

== Production ==
- Mike Rutherford – producer
- Christopher Neil – producer
- Paul Gomersall – engineer (1, 2, 4–11, 13)
- Nick Davis – remixing (1), recording (3, 12), mixing (3, 12)
- Mark Robinson – assistant engineer
- Bob Ludwig – mastering at Gateway Mastering (Portland, ME).
- Mike Bowen – technical assistance
- Geoff Callingham – technical assistance
- Hills Archer Ink. – artwork
- David Scheinmann – photography

== Charts ==
=== Weekly charts ===
Chart (1995)	Peak position
Australian Albums (ARIA)	139
Austrian Albums (Ö3 Austria)	25
Dutch Albums (Album Top 100)	78
German Albums (Offizielle Top 100)	21
Norwegian Albums (VG-lista)	4
Scottish Albums (Official Charts)	20
Swedish Albums (Sverigetopplistan)	33
Swiss Albums (Schweizer Hitparade)	16
UK Albums (Official Charts)	9

=== Year-end charts ===
Chart (1995)	Position
German Albums (Offizielle Top 100)	51
UK Albums (OCC)	69

== Certifications ==
Region	Certification	Certified units/sales
United Kingdom (BPI)	Gold	100,000^{^}
^{^} Shipments figures based on certification alone.
