= Acting Very Strange =

Studio album by Mike Rutherford
- Released: 7 September 1982
- Recorded: 1982
- Studios: The Farm (Chiddingfold, Surrey); The Town House (London)
- Genres: Pop rock; progressive rock
- Length: 38:43
- Labels: Atlantic; WEA
- Producers: Mike Rutherford; assisted by Nick Launay

Mike Rutherford chronology
Smallcreep's Day (1980)	Acting Very Strange (1982)	Mike + The Mechanics (1985)

Singles from Acting Very Strange
- 1. "Halfway There" Released: August 1982; 2. "Maxine" Released: August 1982; 3. "Acting Very Strange" Released: October 1982; 4. "Hideaway" Released: January 1983

Acting Very Strange is the second and final solo studio album by Genesis guitarist and bassist Mike Rutherford and the only album to feature him on lead vocals. It was released on 7 September 1982. Unlike Rutherford's previous studio album Smallcreep's Day (1980), Acting Very Strange uses a very raw and unpolished sound. None of the album's singles charted in the US or UK top 100, but the lead single "Maxine" did make US Billboard Mainstream Rock Tracks Chart at No. 37. The song was also a top 40 pop hit in Canada, peaking at No. 39. The album itself was much more successful, reaching number 23 in the UK.

== History ==
Rutherford opted to do the lead vocals on the album himself, simply because, in his words, "It does feel odd when someone does... a solo album and they don't sing, because the voice is so much the character of a song. So I thought, 'What the hell? I'm gonna give it a shot.'" However, this proved to be easier said than done; he recounted that recording the backing tracks for the album was very easy and enjoyable, but that the vocals were "hard work".

Stewart Copeland of the Police was notably invited to play drums on the record - specifically two of the songs according to a September 1982 newsletter from the Police's official fan club (without specifying which songs). Drumming duties for remaining tracks with real drums were handled by Pete Phipps, best known for his work with Gary Glitter. The Linn drum machine is also credited individually for providing some of the drum tracks.

Looking back on Acting Very Strange in later years, Rutherford was not proud of the album, saying he felt that the songs were very good but poorly executed on the actual recordings. He singled out "Hideaway" as the only track which he felt worked. Dissatisfied with his solo work (and with his vocals in particular), Rutherford curtailed his solo career to form Mike + The Mechanics. (However, Rutherford did sing lead on one more solo track, "Making a Big Mistake", which appears on the soundtrack to Against All Odds.)

"Halfway There", "I Don't Wanna Know" and "Maxine" were performed live on Mike + The Mechanics' first tour in 1986, with Paul Young singing lead vocals on all three songs.

== Critical reception ==
Professional ratings
Review scores
Source	Rating
AllMusic	2/5 stars

In their retrospective review, AllMusic said that most of the songs were weak, and that even the few good ones would have been better had Rutherford not done the lead vocals himself: "There's no denying his sincerity, but he should let his fingers do the talking."

== Track listing ==
All tracks are written by Mike Rutherford, with additional writers noted.

No.	Title	Writer(s)	Length
1.	"Acting Very Strange"		4:58
2.	"A Day to Remember"		4:59
3.	"Maxine"	Pete Bellotte	5:24
4.	"Halfway There"	Florrie Palmer	4:11
5.	"Who's Fooling Who"	Palmer	4:47
6.	"Couldn't Get Arrested"	Bellotte	3:50
7.	"I Don't Wanna Know"		4:36
8.	"Hideaway"		5:58
Total length:			38:43

== Non-album tracks ==
Another song recorded during the album sessions, "Calypso", was released as the B-side to the single "Hideaway". Remixes of "Acting Very Strange" and "Couldn't Get Arrested" were featured on a 12" single and also used as B-sides for "Acting Very Strange".

== Personnel ==
- Mike Rutherford – lead and backing vocals, keyboards, guitars, bass, Linn programming
- Paul Fishman – keyboards
- J. Peter Robinson – keyboards
- John Alexander – guitars
- Daryl Stuermer – guitars
- Stewart Copeland – drums
- Pete Phipps – drums
- Gary Barnacle – saxophones
- Luke Tunney – trumpet
- Martyn Ford – string arrangements and conductor
- Steve Gould – backing vocals
- Noel McCalla – backing vocals
- Dale Newman – backing vocals

== Production ==
- Producer – Mike Rutherford
- Assistant Producer and Engineer – Nick Launay
- Assistant Engineer – Geoff Callingham
- Recorded at The Farm (Surrey, UK), The Town House (London, UK) and The Manor Mobile (Oxfordshire, UK).
- Equipment – Dale Newman, Geoff Callingham, Steve Jones and Geoff Banks.
- Tape Operator – Howard Gray
- Cover Coordinator – Bill Smith
- Photography – Gered Mankowitz
- Management – Tony Smith and Carol Willis at Hit & Run Music.

== Charts ==
Chart (1982)	Peak position
Canada Top Albums/CDs (RPM)	32
UK Albums (Official Charts)	23
US Billboard 200	145
