= Word of Mouth (Mike + The Mechanics album) =

Studio album by Mike + The Mechanics
- Released: 2 April 1991
- Recorded: 1990–91
- Studio: The Farm (Surrey)
- Genre: Rock
- Length: 45:44
- Labels: Atlantic, Virgin
- Producers: Christopher Neil; Mike Rutherford; Russ Titelman

Mike + The Mechanics chronology
Living Years (1988)	Word of Mouth (1991)	Beggar on a Beach of Gold (1995)

Singles from Mike + The Mechanics
- 1. "Word of Mouth" Released: 4 March 1991; 2. "A Time and Place" Released: 28 May 1991; 3. "Get Up" Released: 1991; 4. "Stop Baby" Released: 1991; 5. "Everybody Gets a Second Chance" Released: 1991 (EU) / 27 January 1992 (UK)

Word of Mouth is the third album by Mike + The Mechanics, released in 1991.

The album did not chart as well as their previous album Living Years (1988), charting at No. 11 in the UK, while the lead single "Word of Mouth" got to No. 13 in the UK and No. 33 in Australia. The follow-up singles "A Time and Place" and "Everybody Gets a Second Chance" both became minor hits in the UK, peaking at No. 58 and No. 56, respectively.

There was some overlap with the marketing of the album and the making of Genesis's We Can't Dance, with Mike Rutherford being committed to both. As such, there was no tour for Word of Mouth, however the band (under the post-2010 lineup) would title their 2017 UK tour as The Word of Mouth Tour 2017.

The song "Get Up" was used in the 1993 film Rookie of the Year, as well as in the Baywatch episode "Nightmare Bay: Parts 1 & 2".

== Reception ==
Professional ratings
Review scores
Source	Rating
AllMusic	3/5 stars
Chicago Tribune	3/4 stars
Entertainment Weekly	B−
People Magazine	(favorable)
The Windsor Star	B+

AllMusic suggested that the album was inferior to its predecessors, writing, "The new record led off with two killer pop songs...But within a few months of its release, Word of Mouth had already been banished to the discount racks and budget bins of nearly every record store in the English-speaking world."

== Track listing ==
No.	Title	Writer(s)	Producer(s)	Length
1.	"Get Up"	Paul Carrack, Mike Rutherford	Christopher Neil, Rutherford, Russ Titelman	4:23
2.	"Word of Mouth"	Neil, Rutherford	Neil, Rutherford	3:55
3.	"A Time and Place"	BA Robertson, Rutherford	Neil, Rutherford, Titelman	4:52
4.	"Yesterday, Today, Tomorrow"	Robertson, Rutherford	Neil, Rutherford	4:37
5.	"The Way You Look at Me"	Carrack, Rutherford	Neil, Rutherford, Titelman	5:09
6.	"Everybody Gets a Second Chance"	Robertson, Rutherford	Neil, Rutherford	3:57
7.	"Stop Baby"	Neil, Rutherford	Neil, Rutherford	3:54
8.	"My Crime of Passion"	Carrack, Adrian Lee, Rutherford	Neil, Rutherford, Titelman	4:56
9.	"Let's Pretend It Didn't Happen"	Robertson, Rutherford, Titelman	Neil, Rutherford	5:35
10.	"Before (The Next Heartache Falls)"	Carrack, Rutherford	Neil, Rutherford, Titelman	6:38

== Personnel ==
Mike + The Mechanics

- Mike Rutherford – guitars, bass, backing vocals
- Paul Carrack – vocals (lead: 1, 3, 5, 6, 8, 10), keyboards
- Paul Young – vocals (lead: 2, 4, 7, 9)
- Adrian Lee – keyboards
- Peter Van Hooke – drums

Additional personnel

- Steve Piggot – keyboards
- Ian Wherry – keyboards
- Tim Renwick – guitars
- Pino Palladino – bass
- Martin Ditcham – percussion
- Phil Todd – saxophone
- London Community Gospel Choir – choir (10)
- Kitson Hall Audience – crowd (2)

== Production ==
- Tracks 1, 3, 5 & 8–10 – produced by Christopher Neil, Mike Rutherford and Russ Titelman.
- Tracks 2, 4, 6 & 7 – produced by Christopher Neil and Mike Rutherford
- Engineers – Rob Eaton (Tracks 1 & 3–10); Mike Punczek (Track 2).
- Assistant engineers – Mark Robinson, Jeremy Wheatley and Shaun De Feo.
- Recorded at The Farm; Technical Assistants – Geoff Callingham and Mike Bowen. Olympic Studios, London, except Track 2 at Living Years tour, US 1989.
- Equipment – Dale Newman, Steve Jones and Angela Jewel.
- Mastered by Ted Jensen at Sterling Sound (New York, NY).
- Cover design – Icon
- Photography – Mike Owen

== Charts ==
=== Weekly charts ===
Chart (1991)	Peak position
Australian Albums (ARIA)	55
Austrian Albums (Ö3 Austria)	22
Canada Top Albums/CDs (RPM)	31
Dutch Albums (Album Top 100)	69
German Albums (Offizielle Top 100)	22
Swedish Albums (Sverigetopplistan)	30
Swiss Albums (Schweizer Hitparade)	19
UK Albums (Official Charts)	11
US Billboard 200	107

=== Year-end charts ===
Chart (1991)	Position
German Albums (Offizielle Top 100)	95

== Certifications ==
Region	Certification	Certified units/sales
United Kingdom (BPI)	Silver	60,000^{^}
^{^} Shipments figures based on certification alone.
