= Taken In =

Single by Mike + The Mechanics

from the album Mike + The Mechanics
- B-side: "A Call to Arms"
- Released: June 1986
- Recorded: 1985–1986
- Genre: Soft rock
- Length: 4:17
- Label: Atlantic – Atlantic 89404
- Songwriters: Mike Rutherford, Christopher Neil
- Producer: Christopher Neil

Mike + The Mechanics singles chronology
| "All I Need Is a Miracle" (1986) | "Taken In" (1986) | "Nobody's Perfect" (1988) |

"Taken In" is a song performed by Mike + The Mechanics. Written by guitarist Mike Rutherford and producer Christopher Neil, it was the third single released in June 1986 from their 1985 self-titled debut album, and the third to become a Top 40 hit on the Billboard Hot 100 chart.

== Composition ==
As with all the songs on Mike + The Mechanics, "Taken In" began life as a bit of material on a set of demo tapes that Mike Rutherford showed to producer Christopher Neil. According to Rutherford, this particular fragment "has to be the tiniest bit you've ever heard on my tape... If you closed your eyes, you missed it. And Chris [Neil] picked it out, again, and said 'You work on that.'"

== Details ==
"Taken In", like the preceding single "All I Need Is a Miracle", features lead vocals by former Sad Café vocalist Paul Young.

It reached number 32 on the Billboard Hot 100 in August 1986; it was the band's last US Top 40 appearance until 1989's "The Living Years".

The lyric "There's one born every minute, and you're looking at him" is a reference to the popular expression "There's a sucker born every minute."

== Reception ==
Cash Box said that it "taps a smooth, synth/ sax approach; sultry summer sound with a fool-for-love theme." Billboard called it a "mild, swaying mood piece."

== Music video ==
The video for the song opens with Mike Rutherford placing a collect call to their fictional tour manager, Roy (played by Roy Kinnear, in a reprise of his role from "All I Need Is a Miracle"). Roy acts suspicious, initially pretending to be absent, and is visibly relieved when Rutherford tells him that due to trouble with the tour van, the band has not yet reached the lodgings that Roy booked for them. After the van is repaired, the band reaches the house and sets up for some rehearsal before bed. The reason behind Roy's odd behavior then becomes apparent: he has accidentally double-booked the house to a family with a half dozen children, who are awakened by the band's performance. The mother is confused and upset by the band's presence, but the father (played by actor/comedian Richard Belzer), seeing that the children are enjoying the music, suggests that they let the band finish the song and then sort things out. Afterwards, Rutherford apologizes to the father and appeals to him to let them stay. He readily agrees since the children all like the band members, and they all spend the next day at the beach. The band then heads back on tour, but the van breaks down again. In an apparent play on the band's name, they try to fix it themselves, but the same family drives by and gives them a lift. As they drive off, all the band's equipment piled up on the car's roof, the father comments that they seem poorly managed and offers to be their new manager.

The role of bassist in the video was played by Paul Young's former bandmate Ashley Mulford. Mulford did not play on any of Mike + The Mechanics's actual sound recordings, but was part of their real life touring band for a time.

== Personnel ==
Mike + The Mechanics

- Mike Rutherford – electric guitars, bass guitar, backing vocals
- Paul Young – lead vocals
- Paul Carrack – backing vocals
- Adrian Lee – keyboards
- Peter Van Hooke – drums

Additional personnel

- Luís Jardim – percussion
- Ray Beavis – saxophone
- John Earle – saxophone
- Alan Carvel – backing vocals
- Christopher Neil – backing vocals

== Chart performance ==
| Chart (1986) | Peak position |
|---|---|
| Canadian RPM Top Singles | 39 |
| U.S. Billboard Adult Contemporary | 7 |
| U.S. Billboard Hot 100 | 32 |
