= Rewired (Mike + The Mechanics album) =

Studio album by Mike + The Mechanics + Paul Carrack
- Released: 7 June 2004
- Recorded: 2003–04
- Studio: Fisher Lane Farm Studios (Surrey) Abbey Road Studios (London)
- Genre: Pop rock, synth pop
- Length: 44:22
- Label: Virgin, Rhino (US/Canada)
- Producer: Mike Rutherford; Peter Van Hooke

Mike + The Mechanics + Paul Carrack chronology
Mike & The Mechanics (1999)	Rewired (2004)	The Road (2011)

Singles from Mike + The Mechanics
- 1. "One Left Standing" Released: 2004; 2. "If I Were You" Released: 2004; 3. "Perfect Child" Released: 2004

Rewired is the sixth studio album by Mike + The Mechanics, released in 2004. This was the first album released by the band following the death of the co-lead singer Paul Young. Partly because of this, the album was credited to "Mike + The Mechanics + Paul Carrack". It is the only Mike + The Mechanics album to date with only one lead vocalist and the last to feature Paul Carrack.

The album was released in the UK as a standalone single CD and as a limited edition CD/DVD combo. The limited edition 2-disc set comprises the 9-track CD album plus a 10-track bonus PAL formatted DVD featuring a video for each song plus long and short versions of "One Left Standing". The album was eventually released in North America by Rhino Records in September 2005 as a single CD only.

In September 2004 the album was repackaged in the UK as Rewired + Hits, a double CD combining Rewired with the 1996 compilation album Hits. The cover is a close up of part of the Rewired cover overlaid with both album covers side by side.

Mike Rutherford later called the album "dodgy", elaborating that "I look back at it and you know... we made the record, I didn't think too much about it, but later – I probably should not have done it. The chemistry with Carrack and Young was great, then we lost Paul Young and I kind of battled on – with some nice songs. I shouldn't have done it. And the sound on that – I don't like it."

== Reception ==
Professional ratings
Review scores
Source	Rating
Allmusic	4/5 stars

In his review for Allmusic, Bruce Eder called Rewired "a fine record, a mix of pop/rock synth-orchestrated balladry that favorably recalls both the mid-'70s work of Genesis and the more pop-focused work of Phil Collins". He particularly praised Rutherford and McIntosh's playing and Carrack's vocals.

== Track listing ==
1. "One Left Standing" (Carrack, Rutherford, Sharon Woolf) – 5:11
2. "If I Were You" (Carrack, BA Robertson, Rutherford) – 4:21
3. "Perfect Child" (Carrack, Robertson, Rutherford) – 5:11
4. "Rewired" (Will Bates, Carrack, Rutherford) – 5:31
5. "I Don't Want It All" (Carrack, Rutherford) – 5:06
6. "How Can I?" (Carrack, Rutherford) – 4:44
7. "Falling" (Carrack, Rutherford, Woolf) – 5:17
8. "Somewhere Along The Line" (Carrack, Robertson, Rutherford) – 3:52
9. "Underscore" (Bates, Carrack, Rutherford) – 5:09

== Personnel ==
- Mike Rutherford – electric guitars, bass guitar, programming, backing vocals
- Paul Carrack – lead vocals, keyboards, electric guitars, drums

Additional personnel

- Will Bates – programming (1, 2, 4–9)
- Rupert Cobb – additional programming (1), programming (3), backing vocals
- Ashley Clarke – additional programming
- Robbie McIntosh – electric guitars
- Ian Thomas – drums
- Neil Wilkinson – drums
- Peter Van Hooke – drums
- Ricky Hanley – backing vocals
- Andrea Hunnisett – backing vocals
- Lisa Law – backing vocals
- Owen Paul – backing vocals
- Sharon Woolf – backing vocals

== Production ==
- Mike Rutherford – producer
- Peter Van Hooke – producer
- Will Bates – additional production, additional mixing (4, 9)
- Graham Bonnett – engineer, mixing
- Nick Davis – vocal engineer
- Ren Swan – additional mixing (1)
- Mark Taylor – additional mixing (1)
- Jeremy Wheatley – additional mixing (5)
- Ian Cooper – mastering
- Tim Young – mastering
- Jason Day – project coordinator
- Hik Sasaki – project coordinator
- Darren Evans – art direction, design

Studios

- Recorded at Fisher Lane Farm Studios (Surrey, UK).
- Drums recorded at Abbey Road Studios (London, UK).
- Mixed at Metaphonic Studios (Surrey, UK).
- Mastered at Metropolis Mastering (London, UK).

== DVD credits ==
- Movies researched and co-ordinated by Peter Van Hooke
- Contributions by the National Film and Television School
- Animation by Andy Frain and Touchwood Animation
- Some movies provided by Isabelle Wuilmart, Will Bates, and Frank Laurin

== Charts ==
Chart (2004)	Peak position
German Albums (Offizielle Top 100)	39
Scottish Albums (OCC)	86
Swiss Albums (Schweizer Hitparade)	50
UK Albums (OCC)	61
