= Living Years =

Studio album by Mike + The Mechanics
- Released: 24 October 1988 (US); 14 November 1988 (UK)
- Recorded: 18 April – 18 August 1988
- Studio: The Farm (Surrey)
- Genres: Rock; soft rock; pop rock
- Length: 47:11
- Labels: Atlantic, WEA
- Producers: Christopher Neil; Mike Rutherford

Mike + The Mechanics chronology
Mike + The Mechanics (1985)	Living Years (1988)	Word of Mouth (1991)

Singles from Mike + The Mechanics
- 1. "Nobody's Perfect" Released: 17 October 1988; 2. "The Living Years" Released: 27 December 1988; 3. "Nobody Knows" Released: 3 April 1989 (UK); 4. "Seeing Is Believing" Released: April 1989 (US)

Living Years is the second album by Mike + The Mechanics, released in 1988. The album reached number 13 on the US Billboard 200 and number 2 on the UK Albums Chart.

== History ==
Mike Rutherford began writing songs for the album in September 1987, shortly after the conclusion of Genesis's Invisible Touch Tour. However, he found himself immediately stricken with writer's block, a circumstance he attributes to stress over the complications with his wife's pregnancy, which endangered their child's life. The baby (Rutherford's third) was safely delivered in November, and Rutherford said that the relief made him feel "like a new man". In January he entered an extremely prolific songwriting period, and by the end of the month he had what he and producer/co-writer Christopher Neil felt was a good album's worth of material. In light of this, Neil wanted to move up the recording sessions, which had been scheduled for April. Rutherford vetoed the idea, however, and with his burst of inspiration still running, most of the songs that eventually appeared on the album were written over the next two months.

The first single taken off the album, "Nobody's Perfect", did not perform as expected, peaking at number 63 on the Billboard Hot 100 and at number 80 in the UK, despite being used in a major advertising campaign in the latter territory. However, things changed dramatically with the next single off the album, "The Living Years", which was a worldwide hit, reaching the top of the Billboard Hot 100 chart the week ending 25 March 1989 and number two in the United Kingdom, held off the top for three weeks over January and February 1989 by Marc Almond and Gene Pitney's reworking of "Something's Gotten Hold of My Heart". The song also reached number one on the Australian ARIA singles chart the week ending 13 May 1989.

The title song was co-written by Rutherford and BA Robertson, both of whose fathers had recently died. However, the lyrics were written solely by Robertson, and dealt with Robertson's strained relationship with his father and the birth of his son three months after his father's death. Paul Carrack, who would sing lead on the recording, had himself lost his father when he was only eleven years old, and he continues to feature the song regularly in his solo performances.

A third single off the album, "Seeing is Believing", reached number 62 on the Billboard Hot 100.

Phil Collins and Tony Banks, Rutherford's Genesis bandmates, made a guest appearance playing the riff on "Black & Blue" (a sample by Banks of Collins and Rutherford playing a riff during the Invisible Touch sessions).

The Living Years Deluxe Edition was released on 20 January 2014, featuring extensive liner notes by journalist Mario Giammetti, a new recording of the hit song with Andrew Roachford on vocals and a bonus CD of live and rare tracks.

== Reception ==
Professional ratings
Review scores
Source	Rating
AllMusic	4/5 stars

Reviewing the album for Music Week, Nick Robinson referred to the album a "dirge-laden collection" that had "little to offer apart from some mediocre soft rock numbers". AllMusic's retrospective review summarised 'Slickly produced with rich vocals from Paul Carrack and Paul Young, The Living Years moves smoothly between anthemic ballads such as the title track and more up-beat numbers such as "Seeing Is Believing."' They commented that the album was inconsistent, believing that at it occasionally ventured into genres that the group could not handle convincingly.

== Track listing ==
All songs written by Mike Rutherford. Additional writers where noted.

Side One
No.	Title	Writer(s)	Lead Vocals	Length
1.	"Nobody's Perfect"	BA Robertson	Paul Young	4:48
2.	"The Living Years"	Robertson	Paul Carrack	5:32
3.	"Seeing Is Believing"	Robertson	Young	3:13
4.	"Nobody Knows"	Christopher Neil	Carrack	4:24
5.	"Poor Boy Down"	Neil	Young	4:33

Side Two
No.	Title	Writer(s)	Lead Vocals	Length
6.	"Blame"	Neil	Young	5:24
7.	"Don't"	Neil	Carrack	5:45
8.	"Black & Blue"	Robertson, Young	Young	3:27
9.	"Beautiful Day"	Neil, Young	Young	3:39
10.	"Why Me?"	Robertson	Carrack	6:26
Total length:				47:11

== Personnel ==
Mike + The Mechanics

- Mike Rutherford – guitars, bass
- Paul Carrack – vocals (lead: 2, 4, 7, 10)
- Paul Young – vocals (lead: 1, 3, 5, 6, 8, 9)
- Adrian Lee – keyboards
- Peter Van Hooke – drums

Additional personnel

- Sal Gallina – keyboards
- BA Robertson – keyboards
- Alan Murphy – guitars
- Martin Ditcham – percussion
- Luís Jardim – percussion
- Christopher Neil – backing vocals
- Alan Carvell – backing vocals
- King's House School Choir – choir on "The Living Years"
- Michael Stuckey – choir master

== Production ==
- Christopher Neil – producer
- Mike Rutherford – producer
- Nick Davis – engineer
- Paul Gomersall – assistant engineer
- Terry Irwin – assistant engineer
- Halpin Grey Vermeir – cover design
- Geoff Halpin – photography
- John Swannell – photography

== Charts ==
Chart (1989–90)	Peak position
Australian Albums (ARIA)	10
Canada Top Albums/CDs (RPM)	10
Dutch Albums (Album Top 100)	36
German Albums (Offizielle Top 100)	16
New Zealand Albums (RMNZ)	21
Swedish Albums (Sverigetopplistan)	11
Swiss Albums (Schweizer Hitparade)	19
UK Albums (Official Charts)	2
US Billboard 200	13

Chart (1996)	Peak position
Scottish Albums (Official Charts)	72
UK Albums (Official Charts)	67

== Certifications ==
Certifications for Living Years
Region	Certification	Certified units/sales
Australia (ARIA)	Platinum	70,000^{^}
Canada (Music Canada)	Gold	50,000^{^}
United Kingdom (BPI)	Gold	100,000^{^}
United States (RIAA)	Gold	500,000^{^}
^{^} Shipments figures based on certification alone.
