= Mike + The Mechanics (1985 album) =

Studio album by Mike + The Mechanics
- Released: 21 October 1985
- Recorded: 1985
- Studios: AIR Studios (Montserrat and London); The Farm (London).
- Genres: Soft rock, new wave
- Length: 39:57
- Labels: Atlantic, WEA
- Producer: Christopher Neil

Mike + The Mechanics chronology
Acting Very Strange (by Mike Rutherford) (1982)	Mike + The Mechanics (1985)	Living Years (1988)

Singles from Mike + The Mechanics
- 1. "Silent Running" Released: October 1985; 2. "All I Need Is a Miracle" Released: March 1986; 3. "Taken In" Released: June 1986; 4. "Hanging By a Thread" Released: 1986 (EU)

Mike + The Mechanics is the debut album by the Genesis bassist and guitarist Mike Rutherford's band Mike + The Mechanics in 1985. The album reached number 26 on the Billboard 200 album charts and had three hit singles. "Silent Running", featuring lead vocals by Paul Carrack, and the uptempo "All I Need Is a Miracle", featuring lead vocals by Paul Young, both reached the top 10 of the Billboard Hot 100 chart, peaking at numbers 6 and 5 respectively, with the former also peaking at number 1 on the Mainstream Rock Tracks chart. The third single off the album, "Taken In", was a lesser hit, reaching No. 32 on the Hot 100 and No. 7 on the Adult Contemporary chart. "Silent Running" and "All I Need is a Miracle" were also hits in the UK, reaching numbers 21 and 53 in the UK Singles Chart respectively.

== Background and recording ==
Mike Rutherford began constructing the album's set of tracks by playing demo tapes containing musical pieces in various stages of development (in some cases no more than isolated riffs and fragments but a few seconds long) to producer Christopher Neil. Neil then told him which bits he thought were worth developing, and Rutherford began building these pieces into full-fledged songs. With the exception of "Silent Running", which Rutherford co-wrote with BA Robertson, the final versions of the songs were drafted by Neil; in Rutherford's words, "He's much better at finishing, and I'm much better at starting, so it was a good combination."

In most cases, the lyrics were written by Rutherford. However, he credits Neil for writing the lyrics to the verses of "You Are the One".

Rutherford originally conceived "Par Avion" as a heavy song "with powerful drums", but Neil adapted it into a soft ballad, which Rutherford agreed was a better approach to the composition. The song was featured in the Miami Vice episode "Yankee Dollar".

"A Call to Arms" began as an unfinished "bit" from the Genesis album sessions which none of the members liked, aside from Rutherford. Rutherford received permission from Genesis bandmates Phil Collins and Tony Banks to use it for the Mechanics, then developed it into a full song with help from Christopher Neil and B.A. Robertson.

== Reception ==
Professional ratings
Review scores
Source	Rating
Allmusic	4/5 stars

In their retrospective review, Allmusic lauded the strong performances of all the band members, while noting that the creative and powerful songwriting is the most important element of the album. They oddly concluded that though Mike + the Mechanics' second album was a bigger commercial success, "their debut reflects a more compliant (sic) sound in every aspect."

== Track listing ==
All songs co-written by Mike Rutherford, additional writers where noted.

Side One
No.	Title	Writer(s)	Vocals	Length
1.	"Silent Running (On Dangerous Ground)"	BA Robertson	Paul Carrack	6:10
2.	"All I Need Is a Miracle"	Christopher Neil	Paul Young	4:12
3.	"Par Avion"	Neil	John Kirby	3:36
4.	"Hanging By a Thread"	Neil, Robertson	Young	4:40

Side Two
No.	Title	Writer(s)	Vocals	Length
5.	"I Get the Feeling"	Neil	Carrack	4:27
6.	"Take the Reins"	Neil, Robertson	Young	4:18
7.	"You Are the One"	Neil	Kirby	3:41
8.	"A Call to Arms"	Tony Banks, Phil Collins, Neil, Robertson	Carrack, Young	4:38
9.	"Taken In"	Neil	Young	4:17
Total length:				39:57

== Personnel ==
Mike + The Mechanics

- Mike Rutherford – electric guitars, bass, backing vocals
- Paul Carrack – lead vocals (1, 5, 8), backing vocals
- Paul Young – lead vocals (2, 4, 6, 8, 9), backing vocals
- Adrian Lee – keyboards
- Peter Van Hooke – drums

Additional personnel

- Dereck Austin – keyboards
- Ian Wherry – keyboards
- Alan Murphy – electric guitars
- Luís Jardim – percussion
- Ray Beavis – saxophone
- John Earle – saxophone
- John Kirby – lead vocals (3, 7)
- Gene Stashuk (Note: Misspelled as "Stashuck" in the album credits.) – backing vocals (8)
- Alan Carvel – backing vocals
- Christopher Neil – backing vocals
- Linda Taylor – backing vocals

== Production ==
- Christopher Neil – producer
- Simon Hurrell – engineer
- Barry Diament – mastering at Atlantic Studios (New York, NY).
- Lewis Moberly – cover design
- Geoff Halpin – design
- Peter Anderson – photography

== Charts ==
Chart (1985–86)	Peak position
Australian Albums (Kent Music Report)	36
Canada Top Albums/CDs (RPM)	10
German Albums (Offizielle Top 100)	26
UK Albums (Official Charts)	78
US Billboard 200	26

Chart (1999)	Peak position
New Zealand Albums (RMNZ)	32
Scottish Albums (Official Charts)	32
Swedish Albums (Sverigetopplistan)	36
UK Albums (Official Charts)	14

== Certifications ==
Region	Certification	Certified units/sales
United States (RIAA)	Gold	500,000^{^}
^{^} Shipments figures based on certification alone.
