= Choke Canyon =

1986 film by Charles Bail

Choke Canyon (On Dangerous Ground)
- Directed by: Charles Bail
- Written by: Ovidio G. Assonitis; Alfonso Brescia; Sheila Goldberg
- Produced by: Ovidio G. Assonitis
- Starring: Stephen Collins; Janet Julian; Bo Svenson; Lance Henriksen
- Cinematography: Dante Spinotti
- Edited by: Roberto Silvi
- Music by: Sylvester Levay
- Distributed by: United Film Distribution Company
- Release date: August 1, 1986
- Running time: 94 minutes
- Country: United States
- Language: English

Choke Canyon (titled On Dangerous Ground outside the United States) is a 1986 American film. It stars Stephen Collins as a "cowboy scientist" trying to develop an alternative energy source. It was filmed mostly in the vicinity of Moab, Utah.

== Plot ==
Harvard educated Dr. David Lowell's (Collins) research is carried out in the canyon country of southern Utah and must be conducted at the same time Halley's Comet is passing over the earth. Lowell is trying to find a safe, cheap energy source using the sound waves the comet generates.

Lowell leased the land from the Pilgrim Corporation. However, the Pilgrim Corporation decides the same canyon would be better used as a remote place to illegally dump nuclear waste. Pilgrim's CEO arranges for Lowell to be thrown off his land and destroys his laboratory.

Lowell spends the rest of the film committing sabotage against the company and trying to recover his land, assisted by the daughter of Pilgrim's CEO as well as unlikely help from a hit-man sympathetic to Lowell's cause. Brook Alistair is hired by the Pilgrim Corporation in its efforts to stop Lowell.

== Cast ==
- Stephen Collins as Dr. David Lowell
- Janet Julian as Vanessa Pilgrim
- Bo Svenson as Capt. Oliver Parkside
- Lance Henriksen as Brook Alastair
- Nicholas Pryor as John Pilgrim
- Victoria Racimo as Rachel

== Production ==
Parts of the film were shot at Onion Creek, Professor Valley, the Moab Sand Flats, Dead Horse Point, Byrd's Ranch, Squaw Park, and Moab in Utah. Collins had to learn to ride a horse and get into great shape for the movie. He found it fun to play a "two fisted tough guy".

== Soundtrack ==
The Mike + The Mechanics song "Silent Running" was chosen to appear in Choke Canyon because its atmosphere suited the film's tone. For promotional reasons, the song's title was extended to "Silent Running (On Dangerous Ground)" (the parenthetical title being the title of the film in the UK), even though the lyrics have no connection to the film. The promotional video for the song features a few clips from the film, but primarily follows the story of the lyrics, which are about an astronaut trying to send a message to the past in order to warn his family of an imminent societal breakdown.

== Release ==
Release of the film was delayed so it would coincide with the passing of Halley's Comet over the earth in 1986.

== Reception ==
The New York Times found the film to be "mildly enjoyable", but found the story slight. Reviewer D.J.R. Bruckner did praise the film's chase sequences.

TV Guide gave the movie two out of five stars, finding the film fun as it didn't take itself too seriously, but found the directing to be somewhat lacking. Creature Feature gave the movie 3 out of 5 stars, saying that it was a rousing adventure, although light on science fiction content. It also found the aerial scenes to be well done and liked the direction of the movie more than TV Guide did, but questioned the logic of the movie.
