= Word of Mouth (song) =

- Single cover

Single by Mike + The Mechanics

from the album Word of Mouth
- B-side: "Let's Pretend It Didn't Happen"
- Released: 4 March 1991
- Genre: Rock
- Length: 3:55
- Label: Atlantic, Virgin
- Songwriters: Mike Rutherford, Christopher Neil
- Producers: Mike Rutherford, Christopher Neil

Mike + The Mechanics singles chronology
"Nobody Knows" (1989)	"Word of Mouth" (1991)	"A Time and Place" (1991)

Music video
- "Word of Mouth" on YouTube

"Word of Mouth" is a song by English rock group Mike + The Mechanics, released in March 1991 by Atlantic and Virgin Records as the lead single from their third album, Word of Mouth (1991). It was the most successful single from that album peaking at No.13 on UK Singles Chart. It also peaked at No.78 in the United States, their last single to chart there, and at No.36 in Canada. The accompanying music video was directed by Paul Boyd and premiered in early 1991.

== Composition ==
The song is driven by electric guitar and synthesizer hooks played in unison, as well as the powerful vocal performance of Paul Young, who sings multiple B4 chest voice high notes. Coupled with layered hand clap and audience effects, the song has a distinctive live, stadium rock sound.

== Live Performances ==
The song has been a mainstay in the band's set-lists since its release, with Tim Howar performing the song at concerts post-2010. Since 2011, the song is traditionally played as the final song of a given concert, as an extended version with each member of the band (barring Howar) doing an individual solo on their respective instruments. When played in this extended arrangement, the song often lasts for over 20 minutes.

== Critical reception ==
AllMusic lauded the track as a "rousing singalong" and "killer pop song."

== Personnel ==
Mike + The Mechanics

- Mike Rutherford – lead and rhythm guitars, bass guitar
- Paul Young – lead vocals
- Paul Carrack – backing vocals
- Adrian Lee – keyboards
- Peter Van Hooke – drums

Additional personnel

- Kitson Hall Audience – crowd

== Charts ==
=== Weekly charts ===
Chart (1991)	Peak position
Australia (ARIA)	33
Canada Top Singles (RPM)	36
Europe (European Hit Radio)	6
Germany (GfK)	27
Ireland (IRMA)	19
Netherlands (Dutch Top 40)	18
Netherlands (Single Top 100)	13
UK Singles (OCC)	13
UK Airplay (Music Week)	1
US Billboard Hot 100	78
US Cash Box Top 100	62

=== Year-end charts ===
Chart (1991)	Position
Europe (European Hit Radio)	44
Germany (Media Control)	95
