= Tim Howar =

Canadian-born actor and singer

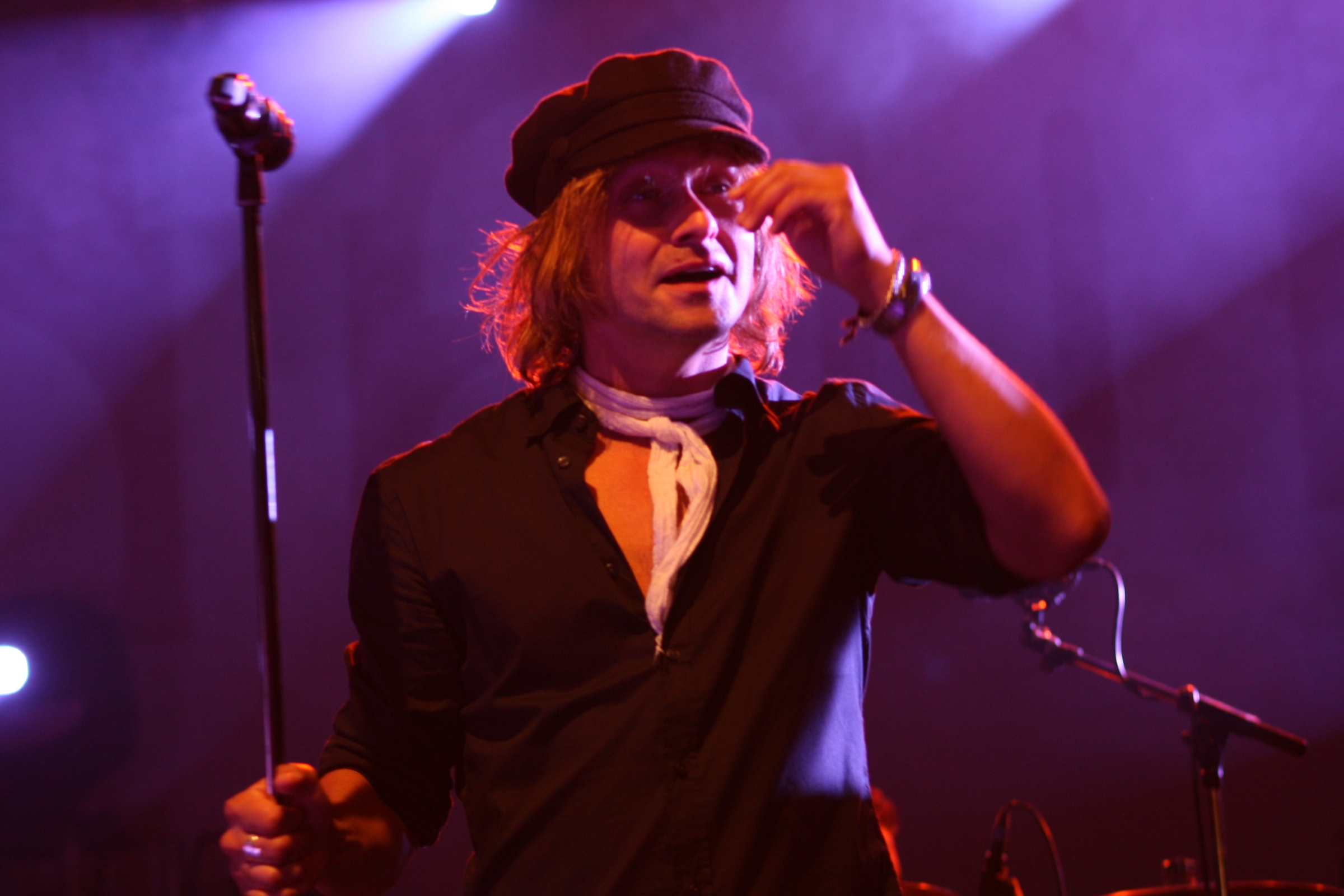
- Howar in 2019

Background information
- Born: Timothy Howar; 24 November 1969 (age 56); Spirit River, Alberta, Canada
- Origin: London, England
- Genres: Rock, pop, musical theatre
- Occupations: Singer, actor
- Website: timhowar.com

Timothy Howar (born 24 November 1969) is a Canadian-born British singer with the pop-rock band Mike + The Mechanics who also acts in leading roles in West End and Broadway musicals.

== Career ==
Howar was born in Spirit River, Alberta, Canada.

He has spent his career on both sides of the Atlantic, starring in both West End and Broadway productions. In his theatre career he has played an extensive variety of roles, ranging from rock musicals such as Rent and Rock of Ages, to classical musicals such as Les Misérables and On the Town. He is a co-lead-singer of the band Mike + The Mechanics.

His career in music started young, singing in the Alberta Youth Choir, the Centennial Singers, and Pro Coro Canada, before joining Edmonton Musical Theatre. His dance career began at 16, which led to him becoming an apprentice with Ballet North. He had been offered a full scholarship to the Royal Winnipeg Ballet, which he declined after deciding to pursue his love of theatre / musical theatre.

He began his career on stage at age 18 playing the Artful Dodger in Oliver! (Stage West's 100th production, Edmonton) just after winning the Grand Prize in the Youth Talent International Competition in Memphis, Tennessee – he is still the only Canadian to hold this award – and then went on to appear in the Canadian productions of Broadway shows Joseph and the Amazing Technicolor Dreamcoat (cover Joseph), and Miss Saigon in Toronto (cover Chris Scott). He played the title role in The Who's Tommy (Toronto and Canadian National tour) in 1996.

Other Canadian productions include Anne of Green Gables (Charlottetown Festival, PEI), Guilliame /cover Arnaud in The House of Martin Guerre (Toronto), Screamin' John McGee in Rock and Roll (Theatre New Brunswick), Barnaby in Hello, Dolly! (Edmonton), Martin in Outrageous (Toronto), and Joel in Anything That Moves (Toronto).

He then went on to play Marius Pontmercy in Les Misérables (1998 US National tour and Toronto) with Colm Wilkinson for over 2 years, playing most every state in America (except Alaska!).

He moved to the UK to play Michael in the new musical Peggy Sue Got Married at the Shaftesbury Theatre in 2001, and decided to stay in the UK after being asked to originate the role of Stuart Clutterbuck in the Rod Stewart musical Tonight's the Night (2003, Victoria Palace Theatre). In between, he also did Ragtime at the Cardiff International Festival. Following this, he played the role of Ozzie in On the Town at the ENO (London Coliseum and Théâtre du Châtelet).

He returned to New York to play Roger Davis in the Broadway production of Rent for the 10th Anniversary production, from 30 January 2006 through 29 July.

He stayed in New York for 3 more years, before returning to London after landing a record deal with his rock-band Van Tramp. UK credits include Latin Fever (West End and UK Tour), Shoes (Sadlers Wells and Peacock Theatre), and Stacee Jaxx in Rock of Ages (2013, Shaftesbury Theatre and Garrick Theatre).

In 2018, he recreated the role of Freddie Trumper in the West End revival of Chess for the English National Opera at the London Coliseum.

From 3 September – 8 December 2018 and 13 May – 7 September 2019, he played the role of The Phantom in the Andrew Lloyd Webber musical The Phantom of the Opera at Her Majesty's Theatre in London's West End. In February and March 2023, he reprised the role in the Greece production.

In 2022, Tim played the role of Tateh in Theatre Calgary's production of Ragtime, before embarking on a 2023 tour with Mike + The Mechanics. Shortly after this, he returned to the role of Phantom in the European tour of Phantom of the Opera, in both Athens and Thessaloniki. In 2025, Tim will tour to South African/UK/Germany/Austria with Mike + The Mechanics. He will also play the role of Stephen in the London production of the Broadway musical “If/Then” in February 2025.

Tim is also a regular guest soloist for concerts around the world, including Raymond Gubbay concerts at the Royal Albert Hall, Friday Night is Music Night for BBC Radio, the Royal Philharmonic Orchestra, Abbey Road 80th Concert, the Halle Orchestra, the National Orchestra of Belgium and France, the London Philharmonic, London Concert Orchestra, the RTÉ Concert Orchestra, and BBC Concert Orchestra.

In 2009, he was asked to join rock band Mike + The Mechanics as co-frontman with Andrew Roachford, and has spent the past few years recording and touring around the world singing hits such as "All I Need is a Miracle" and "I Can't Dance" to sell-out audiences and arenas. Their latest album of new material Let Me Fly was released in 2017 and stayed in the top 10 for over 8 weeks on BBC Radio 2. They continue to tour and play at festivals and gigs around the world. He worked on another MATM album set for release in 2019 on BMG, as well as a solo album.

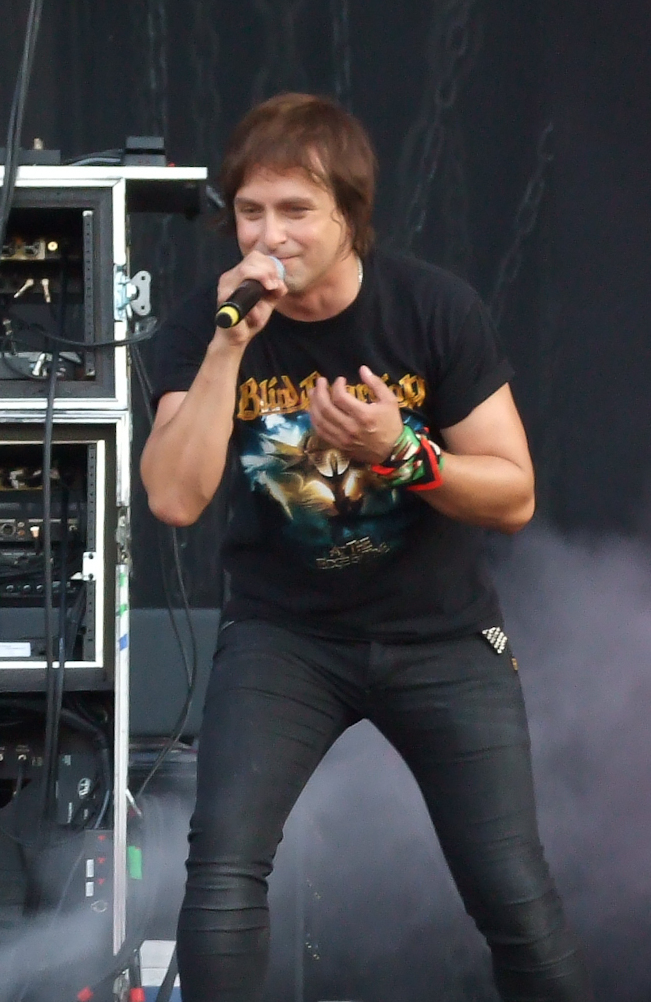
Howar with Mike + The Mechanics at Sofia Rocks Fest 2011

He is also a voiceover artist, having lent his voice to various projects, in particular gaming and corporate work. In 2025, he voiced Ima Tsukumo in the english dub of The Hundred Line: Last Defense Academy.

Original Cast Recordings / rock recordings include:

- Joseph and the Amazing Technicolour Dreamcoat (original Canadian cast recording)
- Tonight's the Night (Original London cast recording)
- Somewhere in the Audience (Eric Woolfson)
- Burning Blue (Movie soundtrack)
- Comrade Rockstar (Original cast recording)
- "Wrong Songs For Summer" & "Uncle David" (for composer Richard Thomas)
- Shoes the Musical (Richard Thomas)
- Wheels of Fortune (Van Tramp)
- The Road; The Hits; Let Me Fly (Mike + the Mechanics)

TV/Film includes:

- F/X (Canada)
- Last Chance Harvey (with Dustin Hoffman & Emma Thompson)
- Commercials (inc. Tim Hortons, Canada)

== Personal life ==
Howar was married to Ruthie Henshall from 2004 and divorced in 2009. They have two daughters, Lily and Dolly.

In September 2016 he married Musical Director Jodie Oliver at Greyfriars Kirk in Edinburgh. They have one son, Hamish, born in April 2018. Howar left midway through the opening performance of the musical Chess when his wife gave birth.
