= Mike and the Mechanics =

English rock band

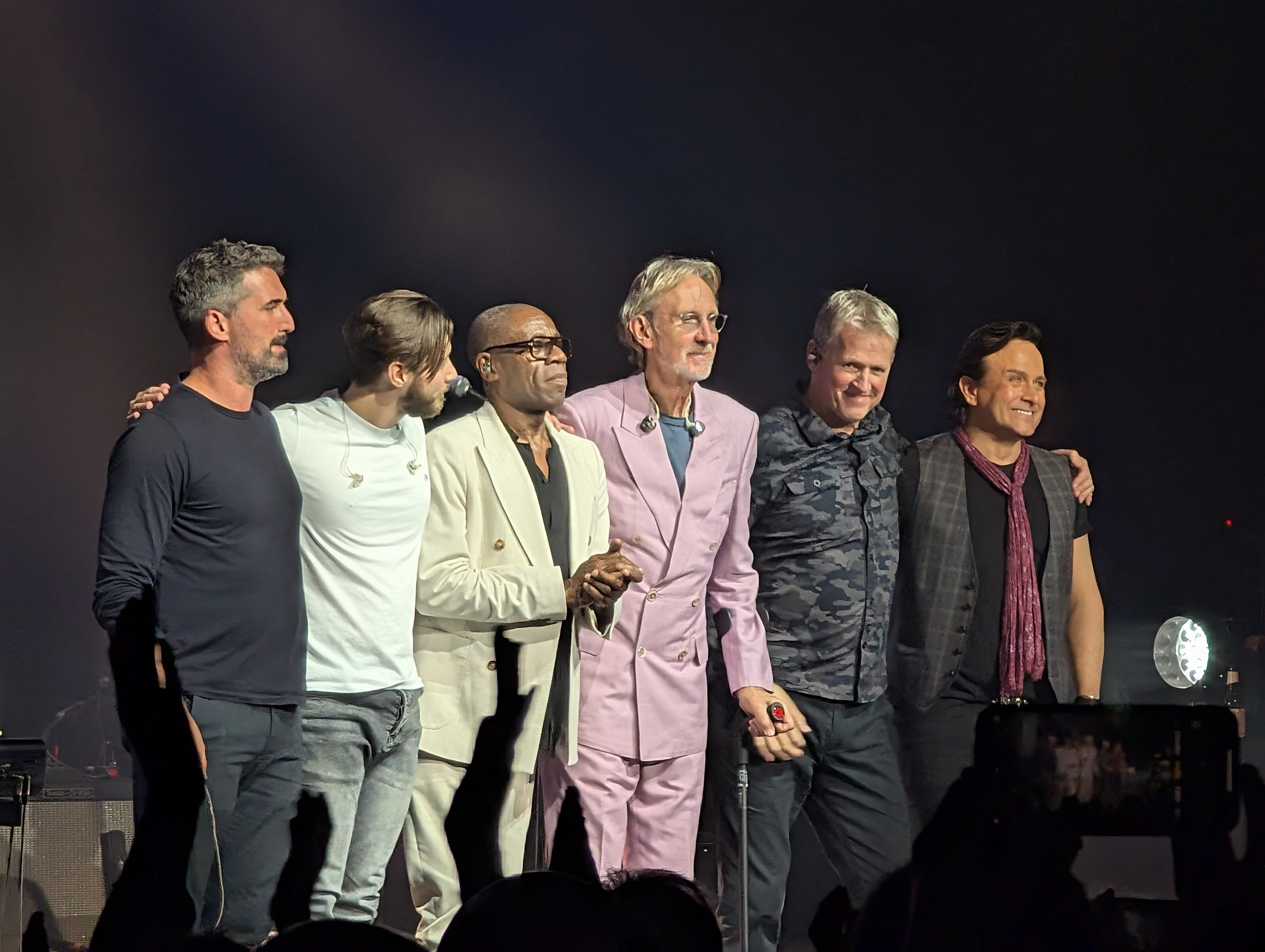
- Mike and the Mechanics on tour in April 2025; L-R: Luke Juby, Nic Collins, Andrew Roachford, Mike Rutherford, Anthony Drennan and Tim Howar.

Background information
- Origin: Dover, Kent, England
- Genres: Rock; pop rock
- Years active: 1985–2004, 2010–present
- Labels: Virgin; Atlantic (US/Canada); Rhino (US/Canada); Arista; WEA; BMG
- Spinoff of: Genesis; Ace; Squeeze; Sad Café; Roachford
- Members: Mike Rutherford; Anthony Drennan; Tim Howar; Luke Juby; Andrew Roachford; Gary Wallis
- Past members: Paul Carrack; Adrian Lee; Peter Van Hooke; Paul Young
- Website: mikeandthemechanics.com

Mike and the Mechanics (stylised as Mike + The Mechanics) are an English rock band formed in Dover in 1985 by Genesis guitarist Mike Rutherford, initially as a side project during a hiatus period for his other group. They are known for the hit singles "Silent Running", "All I Need Is a Miracle", "Taken In", "The Living Years", "Word of Mouth", "Over My Shoulder" and "Now That You've Gone".

Initially, the band included Rutherford (the only constant member), vocalists Paul Carrack and Paul Young, keyboardist Adrian Lee, and drummer Peter Van Hooke. After a decade together, Lee and Van Hooke dropped out in 1995 and were not replaced. Following Young's death in 2000, Carrack became the band's sole lead vocalist until 2004 when the band (essentially a duo at this point) dissolved, with Rutherford and Carrack both agreeing the band had "run its course". In 2010, the band was revived with Rutherford headlining a completely new set of musicians, including vocalists Andrew Roachford and Tim Howar.

== History ==
=== Formation and commercial breakthrough ===
During hiatuses from Genesis, Mike Rutherford had been pursuing a solo career, releasing Smallcreep's Day in 1980 and Acting Very Strange in 1982. He found the process of recording a solo album excessively difficult and the results artistically unsatisfying, particularly in regards to singing lead vocals on the latter album. He recalled, "I had a revelation, too, in this time period ... that I'm not complete on my own. ... I'm much more creative and inspired when there are other people around me and I'm bouncing ideas off." He still felt that working only with Genesis would leave him unfulfilled, and to satisfy both his desire to create music outside the format of Genesis and his desire to collaborate with other musicians, he set about forming his own band.

Rutherford had already started a songwriting partnership with the Scottish singer, writer and composer B. A. Robertson, and for the band's self-titled debut album he enlisted the services of producer Christopher Neil. Besides producing, Neil co-wrote most of the songs, selected the material for inclusion, and performed backing vocals. He would continue to play a key role in the band's albums for their first decade of existence.

Similarly to Steely Dan or the Alan Parsons Project, in the studio Mike and the Mechanics were not a tight-knit band but a vehicle for the songwriting of Rutherford, Robertson, and Neil, and session keyboardists, drummers, guitarists, and lead vocalists often performed on the songs in place of the official band members. The line-up of Mike and the Mechanics came together gradually over the course of recording their first album; Paul Young, who was recommended for the group by Neil and his manager, said that by the time he joined, all the backing tracks for the album had been recorded.

Rutherford was more than satisfied with the resulting album and decided to continue the band indefinitely, rather than leaving it as a one-off project. When the album was released in 1985, his decision was further bolstered by its immense commercial success. Rutherford's solo albums had been moderately successful, and he had only managed a Top 40 hit in Canada, where "Maxine" from Acting Very Strange reached No. 39, but Mike + the Mechanics scored three of them, including two US Top 10s, "Silent Running (On Dangerous Ground)", "All I Need Is a Miracle", and an additional No. 32 hit with "Taken In". "Silent Running" was featured in the movie On Dangerous Ground, released in North American cinemas in 1986 as Choke Canyon.

=== Peak ===
The single "The Living Years" (US number one, UK number two), released in 1988, became the band's biggest hit, and featured on the band's second album Living Years. The song was written by Rutherford and Robertson after both of their fathers had recently died, but the lyrics were written solely by Robertson and centred on the unresolved dissension between Robertson and his father. The song was sung by Carrack, who also had an emotional attachment to the song, having lost his own father when he was 11 years old. The album also featured the song "Nobody's Perfect", sung by Young; it served as the background music to a television advertising campaign for Tennent's bitter.

At this point Carrack began to take a much larger role in the band, joining their stable of songwriters and adding keyboards. The group's third album, Word of Mouth, followed in 1991. It was less successful than its predecessors, particularly in the US, but scored another trio of charting singles in the UK, with the lead single becoming one of their most popular songs yet.

Their fourth album, Beggar on a Beach of Gold, appeared in 1995. It yielded a UK top 40 hit in the title track, and a number 12 hit in "Over My Shoulder", their first hit to be co-written by Carrack.

Their run of successes was capped with 1996's Hits, which compiled most of their hit singles with a new reworking of "All I Need Is a Miracle" that reached number 27 in the UK, a higher placing than that of the original version. The album was certified platinum in the UK within two months of its release.

=== Dissolution ===
In 1995, the band began to dissolve: Adrian Lee and Peter Van Hooke left (before and after Beggar on a Beach of Gold, respectively), and Christopher Neil's long tenure as songwriter/producer for the group ended. Rutherford opted to continue Mike and the Mechanics as a singer/songwriter trio. The group's fifth studio album was released in 1999, Mike & the Mechanics. It is generally known as M6, the Hits album being their fifth release. As the band no longer had a distribution deal with an American record label, M6 was available to the American market as an import only. Its only hit, "Now That You've Gone", peaked at No. 35 in the UK.

Another blow struck the following year: On 15 July 2000, Paul Young died from a heart attack. The band regrouped in 2004 as Mike and the Mechanics featuring Paul Carrack. As implied by the new name, Carrack played a larger role than before, performing all the band's lead vocals and keyboards and co-writing all the songs. They released the album Rewired, which became their first album to lack a hit. Van Hooke briefly worked with the band again during this time, not as an official member but as a co-producer of Rewired. He also performed drums and percussion on the album and its tour.

Carrack subsequently became too involved with solo work to devote time to the group. In a 2007 interview Rutherford stated that Mike and the Mechanics had "run its course."

=== Second incarnation ===
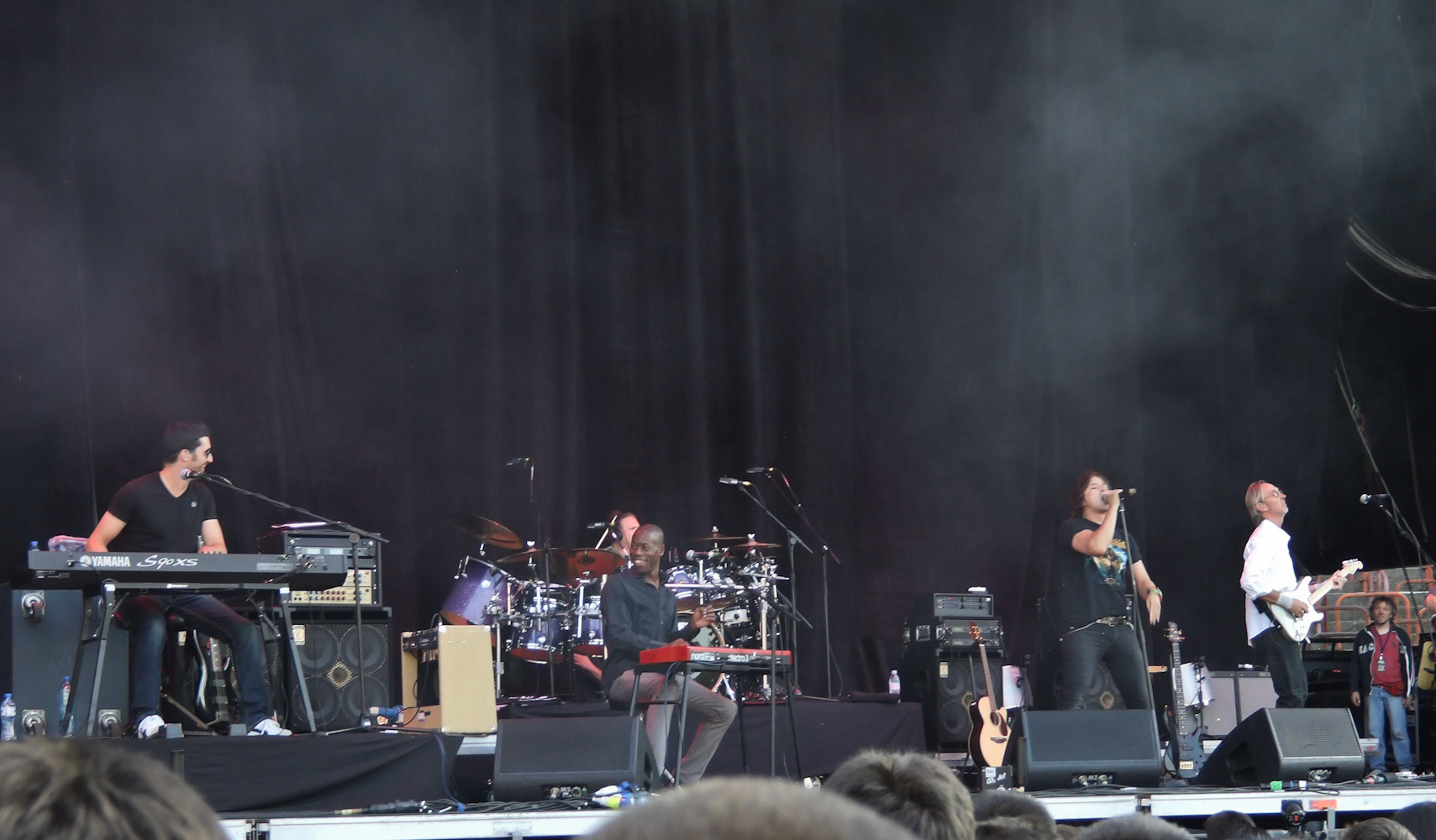
Mike and the Mechanics at Sofia Rocks Fest 2011.

Over several months of 2009 and 2010, Rutherford formed a new band. Despite there being no hope of the original group ever reforming, he opted to again use the Mike and the Mechanics name. In a December 2009 interview, Rutherford stated that "I'm actually doing a new Mike and the Mechanics album. I kind of thought I had put it to bed, but I still enjoy songwriting. Working with a few new co-writers and a couple of new faces for the band. Paul Carrack is doing some solo stuff, so we have a guy called Andrew Roachford, an R&B kind of singer. It's a little different, but the soul seems to be there."

A new album, The Road, and the 'Hit the Road Tour 2011' were announced in November 2010. The album was released in April 2011. It featured both Roachford and Tim Howar on vocals, Luke Juby on keyboards, Gary Wallis on drums, and Anthony Drennan on guitar and bass. Though it became the first album not to feature B. A. Robertson as a co-writer, the album also marked the return of Christopher Neil as songwriter/producer. The tour included performances across the UK, Germany, and various other European cities.

The band continued to tour throughout February and March 2017 before the release of their eighth studio album, Let Me Fly, in April.

In April 2019, Mike and the Mechanics released their ninth studio album, Out of the Blue, via BMG.

They performed along 2023 in the "Refueled! Tour", marking the debut with them of Nic Collins (son of Rutherford's Genesis bandmate Phil Collins) on drums.

The band completed a 44-date tour in 2025, called "Looking Back – Living The Years", to mark 40 years since their debut album.

== Reception ==
In a 1996 article for Q magazine, critic Peter Kane said that while the band "fly in the face of fashion", their music has a "basic decency" and "unquestionably speaks to more people than many of us are sometimes prepared to accept". He stressed, "Mike and the Mechanics: they're quite good, really."

== Awards and nominations ==
=== Grammy Awards ===
Year Awarded	Nominee/work	Category	Result	Ref.
1987	"All I Need Is a Miracle"	Best Pop Performance by a Duo or Group With Vocals	Nominated	
1990	"The Living Years"	Record of the Year (shared with Christopher Neil)	Nominated	
1990	"The Living Years"	Song of the Year (for B. A. Robertson & Mike Rutherford)	Nominated	
1990	"The Living Years"	Best Pop Performance by a Duo or Group With Vocals	Nominated	
1990	"The Living Years"	Best Music Video, Short Form	Nominated	

=== Ivor Novello Awards ===
Year Awarded	Nominee/work	Category	Result	Ref.
1990	"The Living Years"	Best Song Musically and Lyrically (for B. A. Robertson & Mike Rutherford)	Won	

== Members ==
Current members

- Mike Rutherford – bass, guitar, keyboards, backing vocals (1985–2004, 2010–present)
- Gary Wallis – drums (1998–2004, 2010–present; touring: 1995–1998)
- Andrew Roachford – lead and backing vocals, keyboards (2010–present)
- Tim Howar – lead and backing vocals, percussion (2010–present)
- Anthony Drennan – guitar, bass, backing vocals (2010–present)
- Luke Juby – keyboards, bass, saxophone, backing vocals, whistler (2010–present)

Past members

- Paul Carrack – lead and backing vocals, keyboards, guitars, bass, drums (1985–2004)
- Paul Young – lead and backing vocals, percussion, guitars, bass (1985–2000; his death)
- Peter Van Hooke – drums (1985–1995; touring: 2004)
- Adrian Lee – keyboards, backing vocals (1985–1995)

Touring musicians

- Ashley Mulford – guitars, bass, backing vocals (1986)
- Tim Renwick – guitars, bass, backing vocals (1988–1996)
- Jamie Moses – guitars, bass, backing vocals (1999–2004)
- Rupert Cobb – keyboards (2004)
- Owen Paul McGee – backing vocals (2004)
- Abbie Osmon – backing vocals (2004)
- Ben Stone – drums (2012)
- Phillipp Groysboeck – drums (2016)
- Steve Barney – drums (2017)
- Nic Collins – drums (2023, 2025)

== Discography ==
- Mike + The Mechanics (1985)
- Living Years (1988)
- Word of Mouth (1991)
- Beggar on a Beach of Gold (1995)
- Mike & The Mechanics (1999; known as M6)
- Rewired (2004)
- The Road (2011)
- Let Me Fly (2017)
- Out of the Blue (2019)
