= All I Need Is a Miracle =

1986 single by Mike + The Mechanics

- Artwork for European releases

Single by Mike + The Mechanics

from the album Mike + The Mechanics
- B-side: "You Are the One"
- Released: March 1986 (US); 28 April 1986 (UK)
- Recorded: 1985
- Genre: Pop rock, soft rock
- Length: 4:12
- Label: Atlantic – Atlantic 89450
- Songwriters: Mike Rutherford, Christopher Neil
- Producer: Christopher Neil

Mike + The Mechanics singles chronology
"Silent Running (On Dangerous Ground)" (1985)	"All I Need Is a Miracle" (1986)	"Taken In" (1986)

Official video
- "All I Need Is a Miracle" on YouTube

"All I Need Is a Miracle" is a song performed by English pop rock band Mike + The Mechanics. Written by guitarist Mike Rutherford and producer Christopher Neil, it was first included on their 1985 self-titled debut album, and later released as a single in early 1986 in the USA, where it reached number 5 on the Billboard Hot 100. The song also reached number 1 in Ireland. The song was sung by Paul Young on both the original recording and the 1996 re-recording for the band's Hits compilation album.

In an interview prior to the song's release as a single, Rutherford commented, "The thing that makes 'Miracle' different, to me, is that it's a happy song – or it's primarily a happy song. It's 'up'. And I don't do that very often. ...It may not be optimistic, but it's a positive attitude to life."

== Details ==
"All I Need Is a Miracle" was the second single released by Mike + The Mechanics, following "Silent Running (On Dangerous Ground)", which also reached the top 10. "All I Need Is a Miracle" featured lead vocals by former Sad Café vocalist Paul Young.

The cover of the single was twice recycled for Mike + The Mechanics albums, first for their greatest hits package Hits in 1996, and then for Mike & the Mechanics in 1999.

A new version of the song, titled "All I Need Is a Miracle '96", was included on Hits.

In 1987, the song was nominated for "Best Pop Performance By a Duo or Group" at the 29th Annual Grammy Awards Ceremony.

== Reception ==
Cash Box said that "it has a clean, lively sound reminiscent of Alan Parsons." Billboard said it is "upbeat and danceable."

== Music video ==
The music video for "Silent Running (On Dangerous Ground)" ends with footage of Mike + The Mechanics performing the song at a restaurant, and segues into the video for "Miracle". In the video, "All I Need is a Miracle" is the final song in the band's fictional set, so Mike + The Mechanics' tour manager, Roy (played by Roy Kinnear), attempts to settle up with the restaurant owner (played by Victor Spinetti) for the agreed sum of £250. However, the owner points out that due to the gig being arranged at the last minute, the restaurant is more than half empty, and refuses to pay. Moreover, he threatens to hold all the band's equipment (and "the guitarist's right arm", in the early airings) as collateral until he is paid £500.

The bulk of the video then alternates between the band's performance (with Paul Carrack acting as the bassist) and Roy's adventures in trying to acquire the necessary £500. Roy's conflicts get worse when a Chinese hoodlum swipes his money while riding a bike. Roy runs after the thief and follows him to the basement of a restaurant in Chinatown where his money is being gambled away. There he attempts to gamble his money back by playing mah-jong. However, as he is winning, the thief and his cronies kick him out of the building. As he sits in despair, he is consoled by a stray dog, which is soon whisked away by its owner. His luck changes when the grateful Rolls-Royce-driving owner hands him a large amount of money for "finding" the dog. Roy returns to the restaurant, pays the owner the £500, and gives the change to Rutherford, telling him to split it amongst the band. The blissfully unaware Rutherford quips the video's punch line, "That's an easy way to make a living."

== Personnel ==
Mike + The Mechanics

- Mike Rutherford – electric guitars, bass, backing vocals
- Paul Young – lead vocals
- Paul Carrack – backing vocals
- Adrian Lee – keyboards
- Peter Van Hooke – drums

Additional personnel

- Dereck Austin – keyboards
- Ian Wherry – keyboards
- Alan Carvel – backing vocals
- Christopher Neil – backing vocals
- Linda Taylor – backing vocals

== Chart performance ==
=== Weekly charts ===
Chart (1986)	Peak position
Australia (Kent Music Report)	8
Belgium (Ultratop 50 Flanders)	35
Canada RPM 100 (RPM)	10
Canada Top Singles (The Record)	16
Germany (Media Control Charts)	26
Ireland	1
New Zealand (Recorded Music NZ)	31
UK Singles (Official Charts Company)	53
US Billboard Hot 100	5
US Billboard Adult Contemporary	7
US Billboard Dance Play Singles	24
US Billboard Top Rock Tracks	6

=== Year-end Charts ===
Year-end chart (1986)	Position
Australia (Kent Music Report)	37
US Top Pop Singles (Billboard)	74
