= Over My Shoulder (Mike + The Mechanics song) =

1995 single by Mike + The Mechanics

Single by Mike + The Mechanics

from the album Beggar on a Beach of Gold
- B-side: "Something to Believe In"; "Always the Last to Know"; "Word of Mouth"
- Released: 13 February 1995
- Length: 3:34
- Label: Virgin
- Songwriters: Mike Rutherford; Paul Carrack
- Producers: Mike Rutherford; Christopher Neil

Mike + The Mechanics singles chronology
"Everybody Gets a Second Chance" (1991)	"Over My Shoulder" (1995)	"A Beggar on a Beach of Gold" (1995)

Music video
- "Over My Shoulder" on YouTube

"Over My Shoulder" is a song by the British rock supergroup Mike + The Mechanics. It was released on 13 February 1995 by Virgin Records as the first single from their fourth album, Beggar on a Beach of Gold (1995). Written by Paul Carrack and Mike Rutherford and sung by Carrack, it was the most successful single from that album, peaking at number 12 on UK Singles Chart. It became the band's only hit in certain European countries, including Switzerland and France; in the latter country, it reached number nine and spent 20 weeks in the top 50.

== Critical reception ==
Steve Baltin from Cash Box noted that the song "has received many generous reviews." But he felt "there's little imagination to this song, and the programmed rhythm has even managed to take the soul out of Paul Carrack's blue-eyed vocals. Lastly, any song that includes whistling, other than Otis Redding's ["(Sittin' On) The Dock of the Bay"], is asking for trouble. However, it'll still receive fair amounts of airplay, especially on Adult/Contemporary."

== Music video ==
The accompanying music video for "Over My Shoulder" was shot primarily on the village green in Chiddingfold on the Weald in Waverley, Surrey, England. The parish church of St Mary's, with its distinctive tower, as well as the village pub The Crown, also appear. It features Hollyoaks actor Nick Pickard as a love-struck teenaged boarding school pupil and Tom Fletcher (later in the pop-rock band McFly) as a little boy in a junior school classroom.

== Track listings ==
- UK CD1
1. "Over My Shoulder" – 3:34
2. "Something to Believe In" – 4:19
3. "Always the Last to Know" – 4:10
- UK CD2
1. "Over My Shoulder" – 3:34
2. "Something to Believe In" – 4:19
3. "Word of Mouth" – 3:55
4. "Over My Shoulder" (live) – 5:25
- UK 7-inch and cassette single; Japanese mini-CD single
1. "Over My Shoulder" – 3:34
2. "Something to Believe In" – 4:18

== Charts ==
=== Weekly charts ===
Chart (1995)	Peak position
Australia (ARIA)	118
Belgium (Ultratop 50 Wallonia)	21
Brazil (UPI)	6
Canada Top Singles (RPM)	22
Canada Adult Contemporary (RPM)	19
Europe (Eurochart Hot 100)	34
Europe (European Hit Radio)	2
France (SNEP)	9
Germany (GfK)	44
Iceland (Íslenski Listinn Topp 40)	4
Ireland (IRMA)	26
Israel (Israeli Singles Chart)	7
Italy Airplay (Music & Media)	5
Poland Airplay (Music & Media)	2
Scottish Singles Sales (Official Charts)	10
Switzerland (Schweizer Hitparade)	30
UK Singles (Official Charts)	12
UK Airplay (Music Week)	2

Chart (2019)	Peak position
Poland Airplay (ZPAV)	77

=== Year-end charts ===
Chart (1995)	Position
Brazil (Crowley)	70
Europe (European Hit Radio)	11
France (SNEP)	44
Germany (Media Control)	98
Iceland (Íslenski Listinn Topp 40)	11
UK Airplay (Music Week)	9

== Certifications ==
Region	Certification	Certified units/sales
New Zealand (RMNZ)	Gold	15,000^{‡}
United Kingdom (BPI)	Gold	400,000^{‡}
^{‡} Sales+streaming figures based on certification alone.

== Release history ==
Region	Date	Format(s)	Label(s)	Ref.
United Kingdom	13 February 1995	7-inch vinyl; CD1; cassette	Virgin	
United Kingdom	20 February 1995	CD2	Virgin	
Japan	8 April 1995	Mini-CD	Virgin	
United States	18 April 1995	Contemporary hit radio	Atlantic	
