= The Living Years =

1988 single by Mike + The Mechanics

Single by Mike + The Mechanics

from the album Living Years
- B-side: "Too Many Friends"
- Released: December 1988
- Length: 5:32
- Label: Atlantic, WEA
- Songwriters: BA Robertson, Mike Rutherford
- Producers: Christopher Neil, Mike Rutherford

Mike + The Mechanics singles chronology
"Nobody's Perfect" (1988)	"The Living Years" (1988)	"Seeing Is Believing" (1989)

Official video
- "The Living Years" on YouTube

"The Living Years" is a song written by BA Robertson and Mike Rutherford, and recorded by Rutherford's rock band Mike + The Mechanics. It was released in December 1988 in the United Kingdom and in the United States as the second single from their album Living Years. The ballad was a worldwide chart hit, topping the US Billboard Hot 100 on 25 March 1989, the band's only number one and last top ten hit on that chart, and reaching number-one in Australia, Canada and Ireland and number 2 in the UK. It spent four weeks at number-one on the US Billboard Adult Contemporary chart. Paul Carrack sings lead vocals on the track.

The song addresses a son's regret over unresolved conflict with his now-deceased father. It won the Ivor Novello Award for Best Song Musically and Lyrically in 1989, and was nominated for four Grammy awards in 1990, including Record and Song of the Year, as well as Best Pop Performance by a Duo or Group with Vocals and Best Video. In 1996, composer Burt Bacharach opined that the song was one of the finest lyrics of the last ten years. In 2004, "The Living Years" was awarded a 4-Million-Air citation by BMI.

== Background ==
The song was inspired by Mike Rutherford and BA Robertson realizing their fathers had died around the same time. They later learned that singer Paul Carrack's father had died when he was young. Rutherford commented that "The Living Years" was the first time that he wrote a song about himself.

Being of similar age, we both came from an era where our parents had lived through two world wars, when young men wanted to be like their fathers – wear the same clothes, do the same things. But then there was a huge change and our generation wanted to be anything but their fathers. It wasn't our parents' fault, there was just a big social change. Pop music had come along, The Beatles, denim trousers... for the first time, teens had their own culture. That's how our generation couldn't really talk to our parents in the same way. So we had the idea of writing a song about how you never really talk to your father, and you miss out on these things.

— Mike Rutherford

== Music video ==
The music video was directed by Tim Broad and premiered in January 1989. It was filmed at Culbone Church, various villages in North Devon, and Jacob St. Studios in London. The video features Mike Rutherford with his then-eight-year-old son, Tom. It also includes an appearance by actress Maggie Jones, best known for playing Blanche Hunt in the soap opera Coronation Street. The video was produced by Tessa Watts and Frank Hilton.

The video also shows the group playing the song (with Paul Young playing keyboards), with two sets of choirs singing the chorus with them, an all-boys church choir and an adult choir.

== Critical reception ==
Billboard called the song "sweeping, anthemic, and a much stronger chart contender than the previous release", "Nobody's Perfect". Music & Media said that it has a "sweeping, emotional melody sung by a children's choir [that] puts the track in the same classic category as 'Mull Of Kintyre' and 'War is Over'."

== Personnel ==
=== Mike + The Mechanics ===
- Mike Rutherford – electric rhythm guitar, bass guitar
- Paul Carrack – lead vocals
- Paul Young – backing vocals
- Adrian Lee – keyboards
- Peter Van Hooke – drums

=== Additional personnel ===
- Sal Gallina – keyboards
- BA Robertson – keyboards
- Alan Murphy – guitar
- Martin Ditcham – percussion
- Luís Jardim – percussion
- Christopher Neil – backing vocals
- Alan Carvell – backing vocals
- Choir: Child and adult studio musicians, recorded in NYC studio separately

== Charts ==
=== Weekly charts ===
Chart (1989)	Peak position
Australia (ARIA)	1
Austria (Ö3 Austria Top 40)	18
Belgium (Ultratop 50 Flanders)	25
Belgium (VRT Top 30 Flanders)	22
Canada Retail Singles (The Record)	4
Canada Top Singles (RPM)	1
Canada Retail Singles (RPM)	2
Europe (European Hot 100 Singles)	8
European Hit Radio (Music & Media)	6
Ireland (IRMA)	1
Italy Airplay (Music & Media)	5
Japan International (Oricon)	1
Netherlands (Dutch Top 40)	20
Netherlands (Single Top 100)	20
New Zealand (Recorded Music NZ)	11
Norway (VG-lista)	10
Sweden (Topplistan)	6
UK Singles (Official Charts)	2
US Adult Contemporary (Billboard)	1
US Billboard Hot 100	1
US Adult Contemporary (Billboard)	1
US Album Rock Tracks (Billboard)	5
US Cash Box Top 100	1
West Germany (GfK)	13

=== Year-end charts ===
Chart (1989)	Position
Australia (ARIA)	10
Canada Top Singles (RPM)	3
UK Singles (OCC)	18
US Billboard Hot 100	31
US Adult Contemporary (Billboard)	8
US Cash Box Top 100	9

== Certifications ==
Region	Certification	Certified units/sales
Australia (ARIA)	Platinum	70,000^{^}
Japan (RIAJ)	Gold	
New Zealand (RMNZ)	Platinum	10,000^{*}
Sweden (GLF)	Gold	25,000^{^}
United Kingdom (BPI)	Gold	400,000^{^}
^{*} Sales figures based on certification alone.^{^} Shipments figures based on certification alone.

== Covers ==
There are alternative recordings of the song, instrumental as well as vocal, reggae to classical crossover, from artists as diverse as Alabama, Chris De Burgh, West End theatre star Michael Ball, Marcia Hines, Engelbert Humperdinck, James Last, The London Symphony Orchestra, Christian artist Russ Lee, Rhydian, John Tesh, Russell Watson, the London Community Gospel Choir, the Newsboys, The Isaacs, The Katinas, Japanese singer Kaho Shimada, Italian band Dik Dik and Michael English.

Mike + The Mechanics band member Paul Carrack, who performed the original lead vocal, has made a number of solo interpretations. His father died in an industrial accident when Carrack was eleven, making the lyrics particularly poignant for him.
