= Paul Young (singer, born 1947) =

English singer (1947–2000)

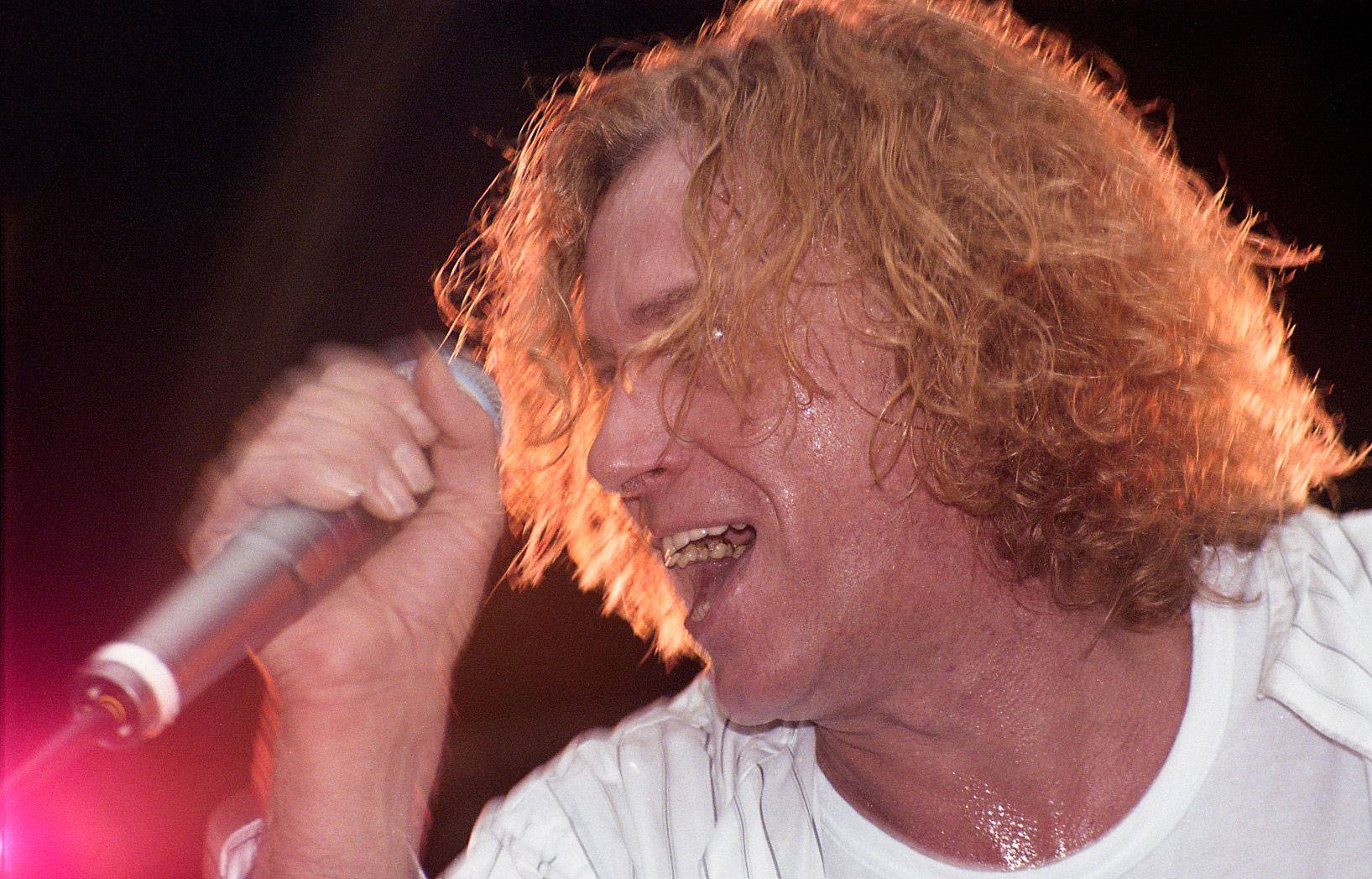
- Young performing with Mike and the Mechanics in 1995

Background information
- Born: 17 June 1947; Benchill, Manchester, England
- Died: 15 or 16 July 2000 (aged 53) Hale, Altrincham, England
- Genres: Pop rock, soft rock
- Occupations: Singer; songwriter
- Instruments: Vocals; guitar; bass; percussion
- Years active: 1964–2000
- Formerly of: Mike + the Mechanics, Sad Café

Paul Young (17 June 1947 – 15 or 16 July 2000) was a British singer and songwriter. He achieved success in the bands Sad Café and Mike + the Mechanics.

== Life and career ==
Young was born on 17 June 1947 in the Wythenshawe district of Manchester, England.

Young was a member of The Toggery Five in the 1960s. The Manchester-based band signed a recording contract, played in Germany, and released the single "I'm Gonna Jump".

After The Toggery Five disbanded, Young became the lead singer of the band Gyro in the mid-1970s. Young and Gyro bandmate Ian Wilson, together with members of Mandalaband, formed the band Sad Café in 1976. Sad Café signed with RCA Records in the U.K. The band's single, "Every Day Hurts" (1979), was a no. 3 hit on the British charts. The band also hit the UK Top 40 with "Strange Little Girl", "My Oh My" and "I'm in Love Again", and had two US Billboard Hot 100 hits with "Run Home Girl" and "La-Di-Da".

Young enjoyed further chart success sharing lead vocal duties with Paul Carrack in Mike + The Mechanics, the pop-rock band formed in 1985 by Genesis guitarist Mike Rutherford. He was brought into Mike + the Mechanics on the recommendation of producer/songwriter Christopher Neil and Neil's manager. Mike + the Mechanics scored three Top 40 hits, including two US Top 10s, "Silent Running (On Dangerous Ground)" and "All I Need Is a Miracle".

During Young's career, he provided lead vocals on several chart hits, including Sad Café's "Every Day Hurts" and "My Oh My", and Mike + The Mechanics' "All I Need Is a Miracle", "Word of Mouth", "Taken In" and "Nobody's Perfect".

Young possessed a wide vocal range, often utilising fifth octave head voice notes, and a voice characterised as "rich". His early style has been likened to that of Mick Jagger; in the early 1980s, he began to explore a more "emotive" style.

On 15 July 2000, having no symptoms, Young had a sudden heart attack at around 6:30pm at his home in Hale, Altrincham. He died on 15 July or 16 July 2000, at the age of 53. An autopsy revealed that the cause of death was a heart attack and that "it was not the first".

== Legacy ==
Mike Rutherford said of Young, "He had a fantastic voice, one of the best rock voices of his generation ... a complete natural."

Former Marillion vocalist and 1980s chart peer Fish described him as "one of the finest frontmen and singers from the history of the British music scene", who exhibited "immense personality, glowing charisma and outrageous positivism".
