= Silent Running (On Dangerous Ground) =

- European picture sleeve

Single by Mike + The Mechanics

from the album Mike + The Mechanics
- B-side: "Par Avion" / "I Get the Feeling"
- Released: 7 October 1985
- Length: 6:14; 4:09 (7-inch)
- Label: Atlantic
- Songwriters: Mike Rutherford; B. A. Robertson
- Producer: Christopher Neil

Mike + The Mechanics singles chronology
"Silent Running (On Dangerous Ground)" (1985)	"All I Need Is a Miracle" (1986)

Music video
- "Silent Running (On Dangerous Ground)" by Mike + The Mechanics on YouTube

"Silent Running (On Dangerous Ground)" is a song by the English rock band Mike + the Mechanics. Written by Mike Rutherford and B. A. Robertson, it is the first track on their 1985 self-titled debut album. It was released as the band's first single, peaking at number six on the Billboard Hot 100 chart and number one on the Billboard Top Rock Tracks chart for five weeks, finishing 1986 as that chart's most successful song.

Paul Carrack provided lead vocals on the song. Alan Murphy was hired as a session guitarist and provided lead guitar on the track. The song's original title was simply "Silent Running"; the name extension was given when the song was chosen to appear in the 1986 film On Dangerous Ground, which was titled Choke Canyon in the United States. The single was re-released in the UK in January 1986 to tie-in with the film, and peaked at No. 21 on the UK singles chart.

The song was banned by the BBC during the Gulf War due to its address of war, nationalism and religion, as well as a direct reference to weaponry in the line, "There's a gun and ammunition just inside the doorway."

== Composition ==
"Silent Running" was one of the first songs to emerge from the songwriting partnership of Rutherford and Robertson. It was among a series of songs that the pair wrote in order to test the results of their collaboration. When producer Christopher Neil heard the song on a demo tape that Rutherford played, he recommended that it be used for the album.

According to Rutherford, the song

... is about a guy who's travelled light-years away, out in space somewhere, and he's ahead in time. Therefore he knows what's going to happen to his wife and kids back home, on Earth. And he's trying to get the message to them to say what's going to happen, the kind of anarchy, the breakdown of society, to tell them to be prepared.

Rutherford named the song after the film Silent Running "because I remembered that film so well, and our song had a spacey feel to it."

== Music video ==
The song's video features several clips from the film Choke Canyon, but it is primarily based on the completely unrelated story upon which the song's lyrics are based. Billy Drago makes a cameo appearance in the video. It was produced by Paul Flattery and directed by Jim Yukich, who had directed many videos for Phil Collins and Genesis.

== Personnel ==
Mike + The Mechanics

- Mike Rutherford – rhythm guitar, bass guitar, backing vocals
- Paul Carrack – lead vocals
- Paul Young – backing vocals
- Adrian Lee – keyboards
- Peter Van Hooke – drums

Additional personnel

- Dereck Austin – keyboards
- Ian Wherry – keyboards
- Alan Murphy – lead guitar
- Luís Jardim – percussion
- Alan Carvel – backing vocals
- Christopher Neil – backing vocals
- Linda Taylor – backing vocals

== Charts ==
=== Weekly charts ===
Chart (1985–1986)	Peak position
Australia (Kent Music Report)	23
Canada Retail Singles (The Record)	15
Canada Top Singles (RPM)	8
Ireland (IRMA)	21
Netherlands (Single Top 100)	39
UK Singles (Official Charts)	21
US Billboard Hot 100	6
US Adult Contemporary (Billboard)	7
US Top Rock Tracks (Billboard)	1
West Germany (GfK)	8

=== Year-end charts ===
Chart (1986)	Rank
Canada Top Singles (RPM)	77
US Billboard Hot 100	70
US Album Rock Tracks (Billboard)	1
West Germany (Media Control)	65
