= Christopher Neil =

British record producer (born 1948)

- Born: Christopher Neil; 1948 (age 77–78)
- Origin: Athy, Ireland
- Genres: Pop rock, soft rock
- Occupations: Producer, songwriter, actor
- Years active: 1972–present
- Label: Rak

Christopher Neil (born 1948) is a British record producer, songwriter, singer, and actor.

Neil has produced records for artists including A-ha, Amazulu, Bonnie Tyler, Celine Dion, Cher, Dollar, Gerry Rafferty, Jennifer Rush, Leo Sayer, Mike and the Mechanics, Paul Carrack, Paul Young, Rod Stewart, Shakin' Stevens, Sheena Easton, the Moody Blues, Wax and Toyah Willcox.

Neil started as a singer in the 1960s with Manchester group the Chuckles. In 1972 he released a solo album Where I Belong on RAK Records.

In 1973, Neil's song "Help It Along" finished third in the BBC's annual A Song for Europe contest, performed by Cliff Richard. The track was a hit single later in the year for Cliff and the title of his 1974 live album.

Neil worked as an actor during the 1970s, playing Jesus in Jesus Christ Superstar and Ginger in Leaping Ginger at the Royal Exchange Theatre Manchester, before working full-time as a record producer. In 1976, he performed the role of the Eva Peron Fund Manager on the original studio album of the musical Evita. His song "And the Money Kept Rolling In (And Out)" was given to the character Che in subsequent stage productions.

Neil's film roles included The Sex Thief (1973), Eskimo Nell (1975), and Three for All (1975), and in 1976 he starred in the British TV series Rock Follies. In 1977 and 1978 he starred in two of the three 'Adventures of...' British sex comedy films: Adventures of a Private Eye and the final film in the trilogy, Adventures of a Plumber's Mate. In addition to taking the lead role, he wrote and sang the theme songs to the two films. From 1976, Neil was the host of the BBC children's programme You and Me.

== Discography ==
Year	Album
1972	Where I Belong

== Hit singles as producer ==
Christopher Neil has produced many songs that reached the top 10 of the UK Singles Chart or the US Billboard Hot 100:

Year	Artist	Title	UK Singles Chart	Billboard Hot 100
1976	Paul Nicholas	"Dancing with the Captain"	8	—
1976	Paul Nicholas	"Grandma's Party"	9	—
1977	Paul Nicholas	"Heaven on the 7th Floor"	40	6
1978	Marshall Hain	"Dancing in the City"	3	43
1979	Dollar	"Love's Gotta Hold on Me"	4	—
1979	Dollar	"I Wanna Hold Your Hand"	9	—
1980	Sheena Easton	"Modern Girl"	8	18
1980	Sheena Easton	"9 to 5" / "Morning Train"	3	1
1980	Dennis Waterman	"I Could Be So Good for You"	3	—
1981	Sheena Easton	"For Your Eyes Only"	8	4
1982	Wavelength	"Hurry Home"	17	
1983	Shakin' Stevens	"Cry Just a Little Bit"	3	67
1984	Shakin' Stevens & Bonnie Tyler	"A Rockin' Good Way"	5	—
1984	Shakin' Stevens	"Teardrops"	5	—
1985	Amazulu	"Don't You Just Know It"	15	—
1985	Mike + The Mechanics	"Silent Running (On Dangerous Ground)"	21	6
1986	Amazulu	"Too Good to Be Forgotten"	5	—
1986	Mike + The Mechanics	"All I Need Is a Miracle"	53	5
1987	Paul Carrack	"Don't Shed a Tear"	60	9
1987	Wax	"Bridge to Your Heart"	12	—
1989	Mike + The Mechanics	"The Living Years"	2	1
1990	Celine Dion	"Where Does My Heart Beat Now"	72	4
1994	Celine Dion	"Think Twice"	1	95
1995	Mike + The Mechanics	"Over My Shoulder"	12	—
1995	Cher	"Walking in Memphis"	11	—
2004	Duncan James & Keedie	"I Believe My Heart"	2	—

== See also ==
- Category:Albums produced by Christopher Neil
