= Mike Rutherford =

English musician (born 1950)

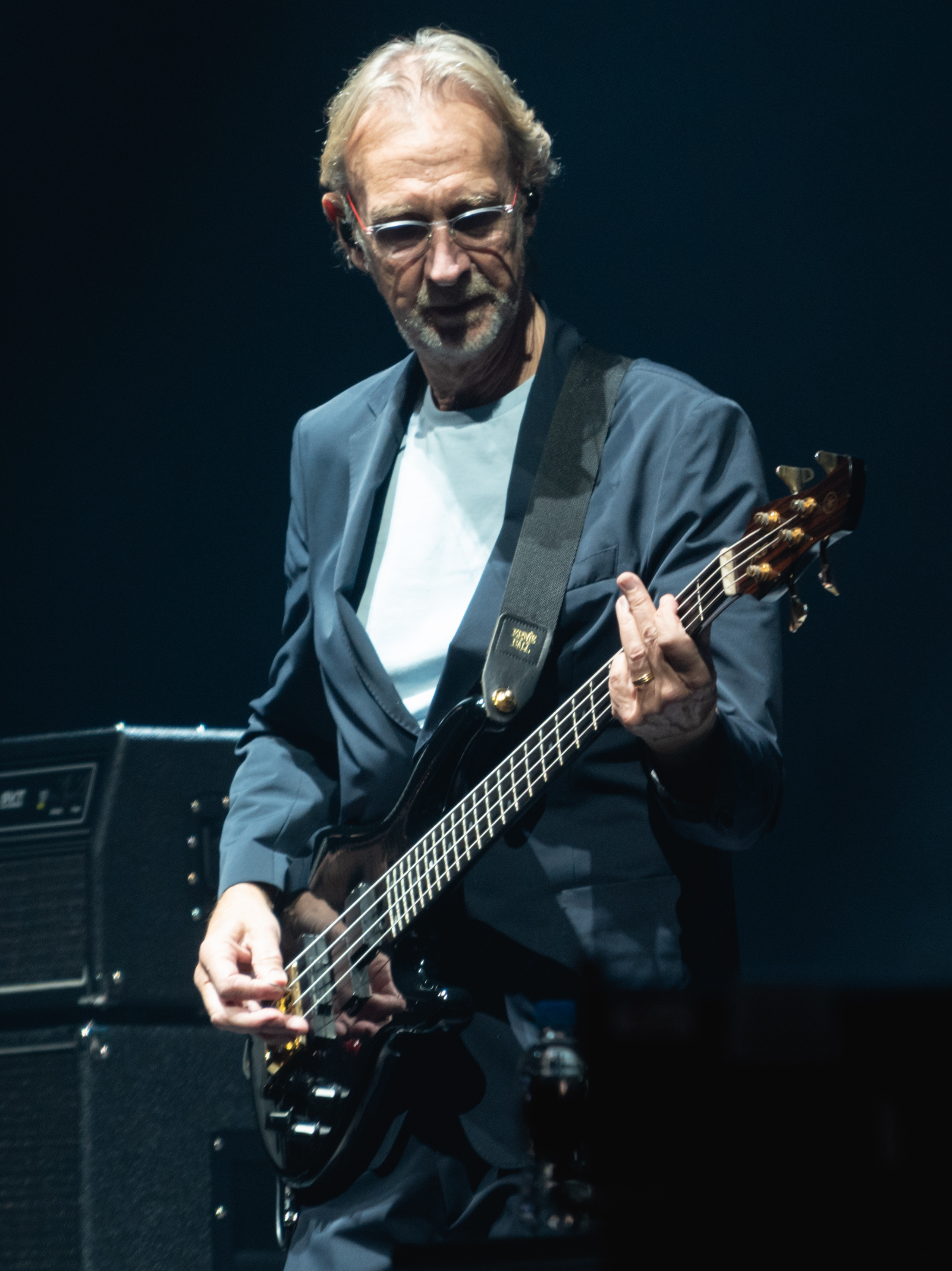
- Rutherford playing with Genesis in 2022
- Born: Michael John Cloete Crawford Rutherford; 2 October 1950 (age 75); Chertsey, Surrey, England
- Occupations: Musician; songwriter
- Years active: 1967–present
- Spouse: Angie Rutherford (m. 1976)
- Children: 3
- Musical career
- Genres: Progressive rock; art rock; pop rock; soft rock
- Instruments: Guitar; bass guitar; vocals
- Labels: Charisma; Atlantic; WEA; Passport (US)
- Member of: Mike and the Mechanics
- Formerly of: Genesis; Red 7; Anon

Michael John Cloete Crawford Rutherford (born 2 October 1950) is an English musician, best known as the lead guitarist, bassist and a founding member of the rock band Genesis. He and Tony Banks are the group's two continuous members.

Initially serving as Genesis's bass guitarist and backing vocalist, Rutherford also performed most of the band's rhythm guitar parts—frequently on twelve-string guitar—in collaboration with successive Genesis lead guitarists Anthony Phillips and Steve Hackett. Following Hackett's departure from Genesis in 1977, Rutherford assumed the additional role of lead guitarist on the band's studio albums (beginning with ...And Then There Were Three... in 1978). Rutherford was one of the main Genesis songwriters throughout their career and wrote the lyrics for some of the band's biggest international hits, such as "Follow You Follow Me", "Turn It On Again", "Land of Confusion" and "Throwing It All Away". He was inducted into the Rock and Roll Hall of Fame as a member of Genesis in 2010.

In addition to his work with Genesis, Rutherford released two solo albums in the early 1980s. In 1985, he formed Mike + the Mechanics, which became a chart-topping act and significant live draw in its own right. The group earned Rutherford an Ivor Novello Award for the 1988 single "The Living Years", as well as two Grammy nominations.

== Early life ==
Michael John Cloete Crawford Rutherford was born on 2 October 1950 in Chertsey, Surrey. His father, William Francis Henry Crawford Rutherford (1906–1986) was a Royal Navy Captain (awarded the DSO and CBE) who became a manager in industry (including for aircraft manufacturer Hawker Siddeley). Upon his retirement from the service he married his wife, Anne. He has an elder sister, Nicolette.

Rutherford received his first guitar at the age of 8, and played in his first band, The Chesters, so named because by then they lived near Chester, in the following year. He attended The Leas, a preparatory school in Hoylake, Merseyside before he moved to Charterhouse, a private school in Godalming, Surrey in September 1964. He co-formed the school band Anon (short for Anonymous) with guitarist Anthony Phillips in 1965, but was forced to leave the band when his housemaster banned him from playing guitar. After Rutherford got the ban lifted, he played with a band called Climax and was later reinstated into Anon. When the lead vocalist and bassist of Anon both quit, Rutherford switched to bass and lead vocals for a time. Anon played one last concert in this trio configuration in December 1966, after which they split and Rutherford and Phillips started writing songs together during the Christmas holiday. They formed Genesis in 1967 with fellow Charterhouse pupils, keyboardist Tony Banks, vocalist Peter Gabriel, and drummer Chris Stewart. Rutherford disliked his time at Charterhouse, and was expelled for instances of minor misconduct.

== Playing style ==
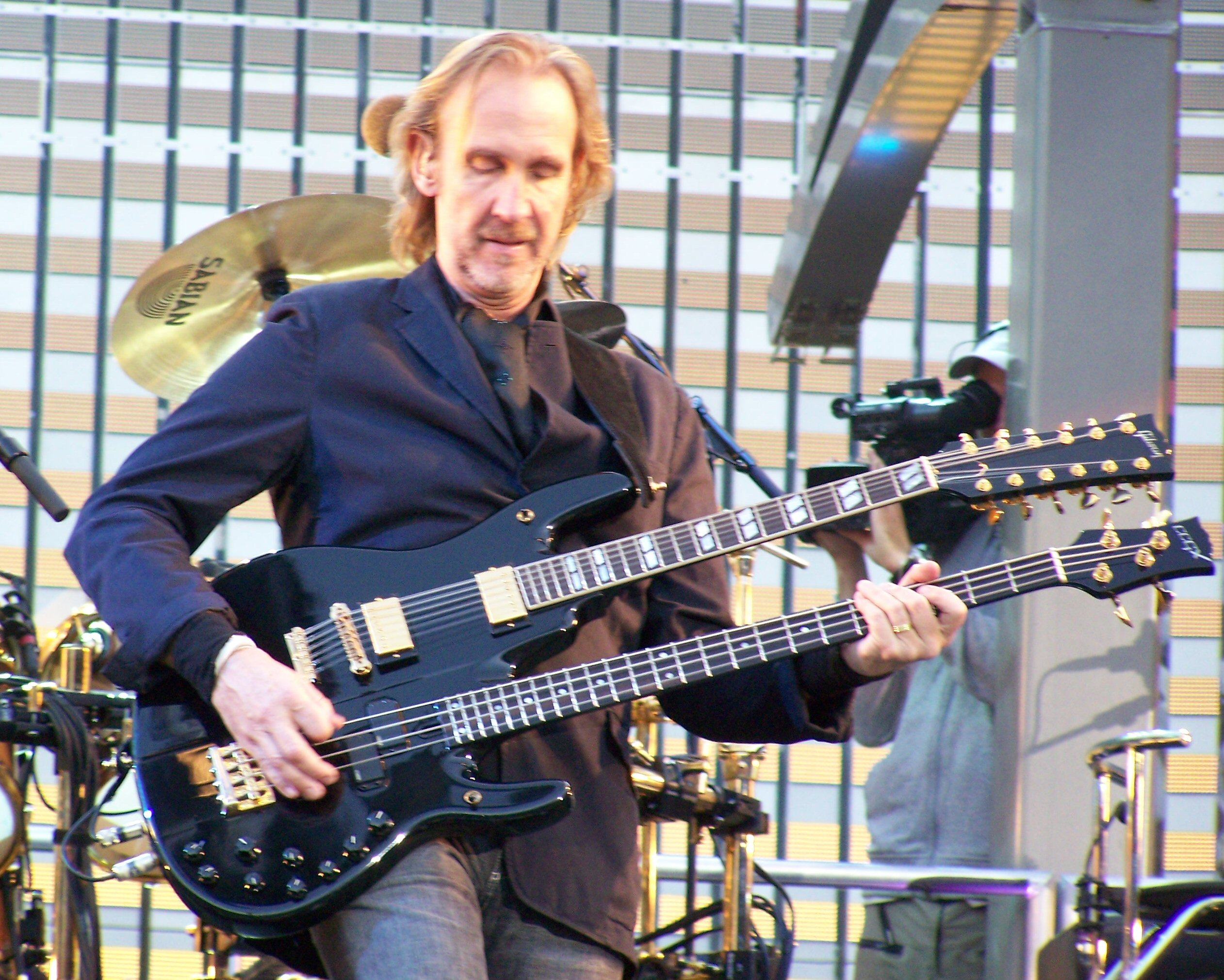
Rutherford performing in 2007

Rutherford's playing style has been shaped by his unorthodox performance requirements within Genesis, where frequent shifts between instruments (or shifts of role between instruments) were common. Though his work with bass and guitar has been praised by some critics, he has described his playing as average and said that he considers himself a songwriter first and foremost.

Rutherford's bass guitar playing initially involved the use of a pick and a high-treble setting. He would also employ a relatively harsh, horn-like distortion setting to differentiate the instrument's tone from the rest of the ensemble. In the mid-1970s he would begin to play fretless bass guitar on Genesis songs (in particular on ballads) and would experiment with 8-string bass guitar.

Rutherford's rhythm guitar playing was initially characterised by his use of electric and acoustic 12-string guitars. A distinctive sound of early Genesis recordings was Rutherford's double acoustic 12-string playing intertwined with that of Anthony Phillips or, later, Steve Hackett (keyboard player Tony Banks would occasionally also play 12-string guitar parts to make up a duo or trio). As a rhythm guitar player and writer, Rutherford has favoured melodic, minimalist chords or progressions of single notes, as in the Genesis songs "Follow You Follow Me", "Turn It On Again" and "Invisible Touch", or the Mike and the Mechanics song "The Living Years".

Rutherford assumed lead guitar duties for Genesis in 1977 after Hackett left the band. Previously he had made occasional lead guitar contributions to Genesis music if they were best played by him (such as the electric sitar parts on Selling England by the Pound), but following the departure of Hackett and the band's decision not to replace him with a new guitarist, despite toying with auditioning new guitarists or using a studio guitarist on ...And Then There Were Three..., Rutherford assumed all guitarist roles in the recording studio, having felt confident enough to double up on lead guitar as well as bass. As a lead player he has favoured long, melodic tones, bending the notes into plaintive, almost vocal lines. This results in "singable" solos or the creation of sonic atmospheres rather than showy displays of technical prowess. Post-Hackett, he has also diversified his rhythm guitar approach beyond his initial twelve-string-based approach.

Following the departure of Anthony Phillips, for a time Genesis performed without a dedicated guitarist, so Rutherford had to play all the guitar parts, using bass pedals to simultaneously cover the bass. Rutherford found that he liked this configuration, and following the recruitment of Steve Hackett he continued to play bass pedals both live and in the studio, often playing simultaneous twelve-string guitar and bass pedal parts in order to cover rhythm and bass parts at the same time. Initially using a Dewtron "Mister Bassman" bass pedal synthesiser, he had moved onto Moog Taurus bass pedals by the 1976 Trick of the Tail Tour. Frequently Rutherford's bass guitar, 12-string guitar, and bass pedal playing have featured in different sections of a single Genesis song, "Supper's Ready", "Firth of Fifth" and "The Cinema Show" being good examples of this. Sometimes Rutherford's bass pedals are used to set up a steady drone as the basis for an individual song (such as "Afterglow").

In concerts during the first half of the 1970s, Rutherford often played a double-necked instrument, custom built from a separate Rickenbacker hollowbody 12-string and 4001 bass. Rickenbacker later issued double neck bass/guitar combinations with 4080/6 and 4080/12 models. However, Rutherford assigned the guitar neck to the top position rather than the 4080's stock guitar on bottom. He later had a custom Shergold double-neck made, with the body modified so that each neck could be detached and played as a standard single-neck instrument, or swapped out in favour of alternate halves (allowing the 12-string half to be switched to a 6-string when needed). On post-1977 Genesis live shows, Rutherford would alternate parts with touring band member Daryl Stuermer. Stuermer would typically play all of Hackett's original guitar parts (while Rutherford concentrated on bass, twelve-string guitar and pedals), but play bass guitar on most songs from the post-Hackett era (for which Rutherford would move to guitar).

Rutherford also contributed other instrumental work to Genesis, performing occasional cello parts on their early 1970s records and playing the drumkit on live performances of the song "Who Dunnit?" in 1981.

== With Genesis ==
According to Anthony Phillips, Rutherford did very little songwriting on Genesis's debut album, From Genesis to Revelation, and it was with their second album, Trespass, that he emerged as a prolific songwriter. Genesis typically wrote songs collaboratively, with Rutherford's more well-known contributions including the transition to the electrical segments of "The Musical Box", the music to the first half of "The Cinema Show", and the lyrics to "Follow You Follow Me" and "Turn It On Again". He also wrote a few Genesis songs by himself, including the minor hit "Your Own Special Way".

== Solo work and Mike + the Mechanics ==
During breaks in Genesis, Rutherford recorded two solo albums, Smallcreep's Day (1980) and Acting Very Strange (1982), but he was dissatisfied with his solo work and in 1984 he resolved to never record a solo album again, believing his creativity was at its peak when working in collaboration. Because of this, he formed the band Mike + The Mechanics during a break from Genesis in 1985. Their biggest hits were "All I Need Is a Miracle", "Word of Mouth", "The Living Years", "Silent Running" and "Over My Shoulder".

Rutherford was one of several artists, including associates Peter Gabriel and Phil Collins, who contributed to the Against All Odds (1984) soundtrack. Rutherford's song was "Making A Big Mistake".

Rutherford played at the Strat Pack Concert in 2004 along with Brian May, David Gilmour, Joe Walsh and many other guitarists, in a celebration of the 50th anniversary of the Fender Stratocaster electric guitar. Rutherford performed in the closing ceremony of the 2012 Summer Olympics on 12 August 2012 as a guest member of Ed Sheeran's band, along with Pink Floyd drummer Nick Mason, playing the Pink Floyd song "Wish You Were Here".

== Instruments ==
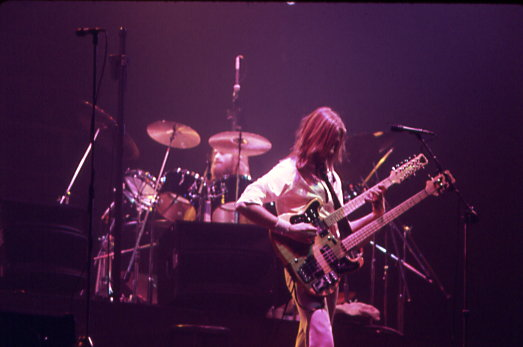
Performing in Toronto, 3 June 1977 Rutherford with his Shergold double-neck bass

Early in his career, Rutherford played mainly Rickenbacker and Shergold basses. He developed the idea behind the M-Series Steinberger guitar with the help of English luthier Roger Giffin and he used this extensively in the 1980s and during The Invisible Touch Tour with Genesis. He had a double-neck Strata (later renamed Status) built for the Mama tour which featured a six string guitar and four string bass placed in a custom body. In the earlier years of Genesis he played a Dewtron Mister Bassman, and starting in 1976, Moog Taurus bass pedal synthesisers.

Through the early 1970s live tours, Rutherford often used a custom built Rickenbacker double-neck that combined a 12-string semi-hollow-body guitar with a 4-string bass (now on display at the Rock and Roll Hall of Fame Museum). For The Lamb Lies Down on Broadway and the first part of the Trick of the Tail tours, he incorporated a Rickenbacker 12-string solid-body guitar and a 6-string Micro-Frets Signature Baritone, equipped with 6-string short scale bass strings. Later he switched to another 12-string solid body/6-string bass combination built from scratch. All these double-neck guitars were made by luthier Dick Knight. A custom Shergold double-neck was made that had modules for 4, 6 and 12 strings guitars. The retunings required for early Genesis songs led to the development of Peter Gabriel's stories and introductions.

For the 2007 tour with Genesis, Rutherford continued to use double-neck instruments when the arrangements demand quick switches between bass and twelve-string guitars. His current double-neck model is a Gibson twelve-string guitar with a Yamaha TRB-4P bass while he prefers Eric Clapton signature model Fender Stratocasters when playing guitar on later pieces. As for bass, from 1992 on, Rutherford can be seen playing mostly Yamaha from the TRB series. During the 2021 to 2022 The Last Domino? Tour, Rutherford started using Squier Bullet Stratocasters after purchasing a pair while under lockdown in Cape Town.

== Personal life ==
Rutherford divides his time between Loxwood, West Sussex, England, and Cape Town, South Africa with his wife Angie. The couple were married on 13 November 1976 and have three children: Kate (born 1977), Tom (born 1980), and Harry (born 1986). The family enjoy equestrian sport such as polo and dressage, in addition to raising horses.

According to The Daily Telegraph in 2014, Rutherford had a net worth of £30 million.

== Memoir ==
In 2014, Rutherford published The Living Years: The First Genesis Memoir with Thomas Dunne Books. The first book about Rutherford's solo career, Silent Runner by journalist Mario Giammetti, was published in Italy (Edizioni Segno) in 2011.

== Discography ==
=== Solo albums ===
Title	Details	Peak chart positions			
Title	Details	UK	CAN	US	NOR
Smallcreep's Day	Release date: 15 February 1980; UK & Ireland label: Charisma Records; USA & Canada label: Passport Records	13	—	163	30
Acting Very Strange	Release date: 7 September 1982; UK & Ireland label: WEA; USA & Canada label: Atlantic Records	23	32	145	—

=== Solo singles ===
Year	Single	Peak chart positions		Album
Year	Single	CAN	US Main	Album
1980	"Moonshine"	—	—	Smallcreep's Day
1980	"Time and Time Again"	—	—	Smallcreep's Day
1980	"Working in Line"	—	—	Smallcreep's Day
1982	"Maxine"	37	39	Acting Very Strange
1982	"Halfway There"	—	—	Acting Very Strange
1982	"Acting Very Strange"	—	—	Acting Very Strange
"—" denotes releases that did not chart
