= Paul Carrack discography =

Paul Carrack discography chronicles the list of releases by English musician Paul Carrack.

== Albums ==
=== Solo studio albums ===
List of albums, with selected chart positions and certifications
Title	Details	Peak chart positions			Certifications
Title	Details	UK	AUS	US	Certifications
Nightbird	Released: July 1980; Label: Vertigo	—	—	—	
Suburban Voodoo	Released: August 1982; Label: Epic	—	93	78	
One Good Reason	Released: 26 October 1987; Label: Chrysalis	—	46	67	
Groove Approved	Released: October 1989; Label: Chrysalis	—	116	120	
Blue Views	Released: 1995; Label: Chrysalis	55	—	—	BPI: Silver; PROMUSICAE: Gold
Beautiful World	Released: October 1997; Label: Ark 21	88	—	—	
Satisfy My Soul	Released: June 2000; Label: Ark 21	63	—	—	
Groovin'	Released: 2001; Label: Carrack-UK	—	—	—	
It Ain't Over	Released: 2003; Label: Carrack-UK	193	—	—	
Winter Wonderland /A Soulful Christmas (with The SWR Big Band)	Released: 2005; Label: Carrack-UK	—	—	—	
Old, New, Borrowed, and Blue	Released: 2007; Label: Carrack-UK	—	—	—	
I Know That Name	Released: 2008; Label: Carrack-UK	152	—	—	
A Different Hat (with The Royal Philharmonic Orchestra)	Released: 2010; Label: Carrack-UK	152	—	—	
Good Feeling	Released: June 2012; Label: Carrack-UK	46	—	—	
Rain or Shine	Released: November 2013; Label: Carrack-UK	76	—	—	
Soul Shadows	Released: January 2016; Label: Carrack-UK	25	—	—	
These Days	Released: September 2018; Label: Carrack-UK	33	—	—	
One on One	Released: 2021; Label: Carrack-UK	—	—	—	
Don't Wait Too Long (with the SWR Big Band)	Released: 2023; Label: Carrack-UK	—	—	—	
The Country Side of Paul Carrack Vol. 1	Released: July 2025; Label: Carrack-UK	—	—	—	

=== Live albums ===
- 2004 Live at the Opera House
- 2005 Live in Liverpool
- 2009 I Know That Name – Live in Concert
- 2016 Paul Carrack Live at the London Palladium
- 2020 Paul Carrack Live: The Independent Years, Vol. 1 (2000–2020)
- 2020 Paul Carrack Live: The Independent Years, Vol. 2 (2000–2020)
- 2020 Paul Carrack Live: The Independent Years, Vol. 3 (2000–2020)
- 2020 Paul Carrack Live: The Independent Years, Vol. 4 (2000–2020)
- 2020 Paul Carrack Live: The Independent Years, Vol. 5 (2000–2020)

=== Compilations ===
- 1987 Ace Mechanic
- 1988 The Carrack Collection
- 1994 Twenty-One Good Reasons: The Paul Carrack Collection
- 1995 Carrackter Reference
- 2002 Still Groovin' (a reissue of 2001's Groovin', with bonus tracks)
- 2006 Greatest Hits – The Story So Far (UK #146)
- 2012 Collected
- 2014 The Best Of (UK #35)
- 2019 Love Songs, Vol. 1
- 2019 Love Songs, Vol. 2
- 2024 How Long (Has This Been Going On) - Greatest Hits

=== DVD releases ===
- 2000 In Concert
- 2004 Live at the Opera House
- 2005 Live at Shepherds Bush London (Mike + the Mechanics + Paul Carrack)
- 2005 Live in Liverpool
- 2007 Live at Rockpalast
- 2009 I Know That Name, In Concert
- 2011 A Different Hat Live

== Singles ==
=== Solo ===
Year	Title	Peak chart positions								Album	Notes
Year	Title	UK	US	US Rock	US AC	AUS	GER	NL	SWE	Album	Notes
1980	"Beauty's Only Skin Deep"	-	-	-	-	-	-	-	-	Nightbird	First solo single.
1981	"Do Me Lover"	-	-	-	-	-	-	-	-	Blue Nun (Carlene Carter album)	Duets with Carlene Carter.
1981	"Oh How Happy"	-	-	-	-	-	-	-	-	Blue Nun (Carlene Carter album)	Duets with Carlene Carter.
1982	"I Need You"	-	37	22	20	30	-	21	-	Suburban Voodoo	Co-written by Nick Lowe.
1982	"Lesson in Love" (airplay)	-	-	33	-	-	-	-	-	Suburban Voodoo	
1982	"Always Better with You"	-	-	-	-	-	-	-	-	Suburban Voodoo	
1983	"A Little Unkind"	-	-	-	-	-	-	-	-	Suburban Voodoo	
1987	"When You Walk in the Room"	48	90	-	-	7	-	39	19	One Good Reason	US release 1988.
1987	"Don't Shed a Tear"	-	9	5	36	33	-	20	-	One Good Reason	
1988	"One Good Reason"	-	28	20	-	38	-	-	-	One Good Reason	Co-written by Chris Difford.
1988	"Button Off My Shirt"	-	91	-	-	-	-	-	-	One Good Reason	
1989	"Romance" (Love Theme from Sing)	-	-	-	14	158	-	-	-	Sing Soundtrack	Duet with Terri Nunn.
1989	"Don't Shed a Tear" (1989 release)	60	-	-	-	-	-	-	-	One Good Reason	UK and Australian reissue.
1989	"I Live by the Groove"	-	31	-	22	105	-	-	-	Groove Approved	
1990	"Battlefield"	-	-	-	-	141	-	-	-	Groove Approved	
1990	"Loveless"	-	-	-	-	-	-	-	-	Groove Approved	Co-written by T-Bone Wolk.
1990	"Dedicated"	-	-	-	-	-	-	20	-	Groove Approved	
1990	"Hey You" (Live) (airplay)	-	-	37	-	-	-	-	-	The Wall – Live in Berlin (Roger Waters album)	Roger Waters & the Bleeding Heart Band with Paul Carrack.
1991	"Don't Dream It's Over"	20	-	-	-	-	-	67	-	From Time to Time – The Singles Collection (Paul Young album)	Paul Young feat. Paul Carrack
1993	"In the Time It Takes"	-	-	-	25	-	-	-	-	You Hold the Key (Beth Nielsen Chapman album)	Duet with Beth Nielsen Chapman
1995	"Eyes of Blue"	40	-	-	24	-	-	71	-	Blue Views	US release 1997 (after "For Once in Our Lives")
1996	"How Long"	32	-	-	-	-	-	-	-	Blue Views	Re-recording of his hit with Ace.
1996	"Eyes of Blue" (Remix)	45	-	-	-	-	-	-	-	Blue Views	Remixed version of Eyes of Blue.
1996	"Your Own Special Way"	-	-	-	-	-	-	-	-	Genesis Revisited (Steve Hackett album)	Steve Hackett & Paul Carrack
1997	"For Once in Our Lives"	-	-	-	3	-	-	-	-	Blue Views	US release – didn't chart on Billboard Hot 100 but did reach # 72 on Hot 100 Airplay Chart.
1997	"The Way I'm Feeling Tonight"	84	-	-	-	-	93	100	-	Beautiful World	Co-written by Graham Gouldman.
1998	"Perfect Love"	-	-	-	-	-	-	-	-	Beautiful World	
1998	"Beautiful World"	-	-	-	-	-	-	-	-	Beautiful World	
2000	"Satisfy My Soul"	199	-	-	-	-	-	87	-	Satisfy My Soul	
2000	"My Kind"	-	-	-	-	-	-	-	-	Satisfy My Soul	
2000	"How Wonderful"	-	-	-	-	-	-	-	-	Satisfy My Soul	
2001	"Together"	-	-	-	-	-	-	-	-	Satisfy My Soul	
2001	"Groovin'"	177	-	-	-	-	-	90	-	Groovin	
2001	"Anyday Now" / "Walk on By"	-	-	-	-	-	-	-	-	Groovin	Double A-side single.
2002	"Better Than Nothing"	-	-	-	-	-	-	89	-	Satisfy My Soul / In Concert (DVD)	Dutch-only release
2002	"Sunny"	-	-	-	-	-	-	-	-	Groovin	
2002	"Harvest for the World"	-	-	-	-	-	-	-	-	Groovin	
2002	"Where Did I Go Wrong?"	184	-	-	-	-	-	95	-	It Ain't Over	UK release after "She Lived Down the Street"
2003	"She Lived Down the Street"	90	-	-	-	-	-	-	-	It Ain't Over	Co-written by Chris Difford.
2003	"Happy To See You Again"	-	-	-	-	-	-	-	-	It Ain't Over	
2003	"Nothin' To Lose"	-	-	-	-	-	-	-	-	It Ain't Over	
2003	"It Ain't Over"	-	-	-	-	-	-	-	-	It Ain't Over	
2006	"Love Will Keep Us Alive" (Duet Version)	-	-	-	-	-	-	-	-	non-album single	Duet with Belgian singer Sofie.
2008	"Ain't No Love in the Heart of the City"	150	-	-	-	-	-	-	-	I Know That Name	
2011	"Time to Move On EP"	-	-	-	-	-	-	-	-	Good Feeling	
2012	"When My Little Girl Is Smiling"	170	-	-	-	-	-	-	-	Good Feeling	
2013	"That's All That Matters to Me"	-	-	-	-	-	-	-	-	Rain or Shine	
2014	"Life's Too Short"	-	-	-	-	-	-	-	-	Rain or Shine	
2014	"I'm Losing You"	164	-	-	-	-	-	-	-	Rain or Shine	

=== Mike + The Mechanics singles ===
Year	Title	Peak chart positions									Album	Notes
Year	Title	UK	US	US Rock	US AC	AUS	GER	IRE	NL	SWE	Album	Notes
1985	"Silent Running (On Dangerous Ground)"	21	6	1	7	23	8	21	39	-	Mike + The Mechanics	Lead vocals by Paul Carrack.
1986	"All I Need Is a Miracle"	53	5	6	7	8	26	30	-	-	Mike + The Mechanics	
1986	"Taken In"	-	32	7	-	-	-	-	-	-	Mike + The Mechanics	
1988	"Nobody's Perfect"	80	63	3	-	29	-	-	-	-	The Living Years	
1988	"Seeing Is Believing"	-	62	18	-	91	-	-	-	-	The Living Years	Australia released 1988 (after "The Living Years")
1988	"The Living Years"	2	1	5	1	1	13	1	20	18	The Living Years	Lead vocals by Paul Carrack.
1989	"Nobody Knows"	81	-	-	-	-	-	30	-	-	The Living Years	Lead vocals by Paul Carrack.
1989	"Revolution"	-	-	-	-	-	-	-	-	-	Rude Awakening Soundtrack	
1991	"Word of Mouth"	13	78	30	-	33	27	19	13	-	Word of Mouth	
1991	"A Time And Place"	58	-	-	-	-	-	-	-	-	Word of Mouth	Lead vocals by Paul Carrack.
1991	"Everybody Gets A Second Chance"	56	-	-	-	-	51	-	-	-	Word of Mouth	Lead vocals by Paul Carrack.
1991	"Stop Baby"	-	-	-	-	-	-	-	-	-	Word of Mouth	
1995	"Over My Shoulder"	12	-	-	-	-	44	26	-	-	Beggar on a Beach of Gold	Lead vocals by Paul Carrack.
1995	"A Beggar on a Beach of Gold"	33	-	-	-	-	64	-	-	-	Beggar on a Beach of Gold	
1995	"Another Cup Of Coffee"	51	-	-	-	-	61	-	-	-	Beggar on a Beach of Gold	Lead vocals by Paul Carrack.
1996	"All I Need Is A Miracle '96"	27	-	-	-	-	81	-	-	-	Hits	
1996	"Silent Running" (1996 Release)	61	-	-	-	-	-	-	-	-	Hits	Lead vocals by Paul Carrack. Re-issue of the 1985 hit.
1999	"Now That You've Gone"	35	-	-	-	-	64	-	-	-	Mike + The Mechanics – M6	Lead vocals by Paul Carrack.
1999	"Whenever I Stop"	73	-	-	-	-	76	-	-	-	Mike + The Mechanics – M6	Lead vocals by Paul Carrack.
2004	"One Left Standing"	-	-	-	-	-	-	-	-	-	Rewired	Mike + The Mechanics + Paul Carrack
2004	"Perfect Child"	-	-	-	-	-	-	-	-	-	Rewired	Mike + The Mechanics + Paul Carrack
2004	"If I Were You"	-	-	-	-	-	-	-	-	-	Rewired	Mike + The Mechanics + Paul Carrack
2004	"Miracle"	198	-	-	-	86	-	-	-	-	non-album single	Red Kult feat. Mike + The Mechanics

=== Ace, Squeeze and Spin 1ne 2wo singles ===
Year	Title	Peak chart positions								Album	Notes
Year	Title	UK	US	US Rock	US AC	AUS	GER	NL	SWE	Album	Notes
with Ace
1974	"How Long"	20	3	-	-	63	-	-	-	Five-A-Side	Band member (vocals, keyboards)
1975	"Rock & Roll Runaway"	-	71	-	-	-	-	-	-	Five-A-Side	Band member (vocals, keyboards)
1975	"I Ain't Gonna Stand for This No More"	-	-	-	-	-	-	-	-	Time For Another	Band member (vocals, keyboards)
1976	"No Future in Your Eyes"	-	-	-	-	-	-	-	-	Time For Another	Band member (vocals, keyboards)
1976	"I'm a Man"	-	-	-	-	-	-	-	-	Time For Another	Band member (vocals, keyboards)
1977	"You're All That I Need"	-	-	-	-	-	-	-	-	No Strings	Band member (vocals, keyboards)
1977	"Found Out the Hard Way"	-	-	-	-	-	-	-	-	No Strings	Band member (vocals, keyboards)
1977	"How Long" (Re-release)	-	-	-	-	-	-	-	-	Five-A-Side	Band member (vocals, keyboards)
1982	"How Long" (1982 Release)	-	-	-	-	-	-	-	-	Six-A-Side	Band member (vocals, keyboards)
with Squeeze
1981	"Is That Love"	35	-	-	-	-	-	-	-	East Side Story	Band member (keyboards).
1981	"Tempted"	41	49	8	-	-	-	-	-	East Side Story	Band member (lead vocals, keyboards).
1981	"Labelled with Love"	4	-	-	-	-	-	46	-	East Side Story	Band member (keyboards).
1981	"Messed Around"	-	-	-	-	-	-	-	-	East Side Story	Band member (keyboards).
1993	"Third Rail"	39	-	-	-	-	-	-	-	Some Fantastic Place	Band member (keyboards).
1993	"Some Fantastic Place"	73	-	-	-	-	-	-	-	Some Fantastic Place	Band member (keyboards).
1993	"Loving You Tonight"	-	-	-	-	-	-	-	-	Some Fantastic Place	Band member (lead vocals, keyboards). Initial promo release credited to "The Pressure".
1993	"Everything in the World"	-	-	-	-	-	-	-	-	Some Fantastic Place	Band member (keyboards). US release only. Reached #9 on US Modern Rock chart.
1994	"It's Over"	89	-	-	-	-	-	-	-	Some Fantastic Place	Band member (keyboards, backing vocals).
1994	"Tempted '94"	-	-	-	-	-	-	-	-	Reality Bites Soundtrack	Band member (lead vocals, keyboards).
with Spin 1ne 2wo
1993	"Can't Find My Way Home"	-	-	-	-	-	-	-	-	Spin 1ne 2wo	Band member (lead vocals, keyboards).
1993	"All Along the Watchtower"	-	-	-	-	-	-	-	-	Spin 1ne 2wo	Band member (lead vocals, keyboards).

=== Other recordings ===
Year	Artist	Title	Peak chart positions				Notes
Year	Artist	Title	UK	US	US AC	NL	Notes
1978	Frankie Miller	"Stubborn Kind of Fellow"	-	-	-	-	Session musician (keyboards).
1978	Frankie Miller	"Darlin'"	6	103	-	-	Session musician (keyboards).
1979	Frankie Miller	"When I'm Away from You"	42	-	-	-	Session musician (keyboards).
1979	Roxy Music	"Trash"	40	-	-	40	Session musician (keyboards).
1979	Frankie Miller	"Good to See You"	-	-	-	-	Session musician (keyboards).
1979	Roxy Music	"Angel Eyes"	4	-	-	13	Session musician (keyboards).
1980	Roxy Music	"Oh Yeah (On the Radio)"	5	102	-	39	Session musician (strings).
1983	Nick Lowe	"Ragin' Eyes"	-	-	-	-	Session musician (keyboards).
1983	John Hiatt	"Riding with the King"	-	-	-	-	Session musician (keyboards). Promo release only.
1984	Nick Lowe and His Cowboy Outfit	"Half a Boy and Half a Man"	53	110	-	8	Band member (keyboards).
1984	Nick Lowe and His Cowboy Outfit	"L.A.F.S."	-	-	-	-	Band member (keyboards).
1984	The Pretenders	"Thin Line Between Love and Hate"	49	83	-	32	Session musician (piano, backing vocals).
1990	Rock Against Repatriation	"Sailing"	-	-	-	-	Band member (vocals). An ad hoc all-star band, with proceeds from the single going to charity.
1990	Roger Waters	"The Powers That Be"	-	-	-	-	Vocals.
1990	Roger Waters	"The Tide Is Turning"	-	-	-	-	Chorus vocals. Live recording.
1997	Elton John	"Something About The Way You Look Tonight"	1	1	2	1	Session musician (organ). Double A-side with "Candle in the Wind 1997". The best selling single of all time. The standalone version of "Something about..." also charted: on the US/AC at #1, in Canada at #14 and in Netherlands at #94.
1998	Eric Clapton	"Pilgrim"	170	-	-	-	Session musician (organ).
2009	United Artists Remember feat Paul Carrack, Paul Rodgers, Robin Gibb, Michael Bolton, Hayley Westenra, Mica Paris, Lee Mead, Kenney Jones, Mark Read; Carol Decker, Liz McClarnon, Natasha Hamilton and The Royal Philharmonic Orchestra	"We Will Remember Them"	-	-	-	-	Performer. Charity record released in aid of Royal British Legion and Help For Heroes.

=== Other appearances ===
Year	Song	Album
2002	"It's So Blue"	Jools Holland's Big Band Rhythm & Blues
