= Satisfy My Soul =

Satisfy My Soul may refer to:

- "Satisfy My Soul" (song), a 1978 song by Bob Marley and the Wailers
- Satisfy My Soul (album), a 2000 album by Paul Carrack
