= It Ain't Over =

It Ain't Over may refer to:

- It Ain't Over..., a 2008 album by The Outfield
- It Ain't Over (Paul Carrack album), a 2003 album
- "It Ain't Over", a song from WOW Gospel 2010
- "It Ain't Over", a 2017 song by RuPaul from American
- It Ain't Over (film), a 2022 documentary film about Yogi Berra
- "It Ain't Over", a 2022 song by The Black Keys from Dropout Boogie
