= Eric Clapton World Tour (2019) =

2019 concert tour by Eric Clapton

- World tour by Eric Clapton
- Promotional poster
- Start date: 13 April 2019
- End date: 21 September 2019
- Legs: 3
- No. of shows: 5 in Asia; 7 in Europe; 5 in North America
- Website: ericclapton.com/tour

Eric Clapton concert chronology
- Eric Clapton World Tour (2018); Eric Clapton World Tour (2019); North American Tour (2021)

The Eric Clapton World Tour 2019 is a concert tour by British rock and blues guitarist and singer Eric Clapton, which started on 13 April 2019 through 20 April 2019 at the Nippon Budokan in Tokyo. As of 22 April 2019, a total of seventeen live performances in Japan, in the United Kingdom, Austria, Germany and in the United States were announced. The concert tour ended on 21 September 2019 in Dallas, United States.

== Background ==
In September 2018, Clapton went to see a concert, held by the German cellist Jan Vogler, who is also the head of artist relations of the Dresden Music Festival. After the show, the two talked about how to keep their hands and fingers in shape during concert tours, according to the Sächsische Zeitung. During the conversation, Vogler invited Clapton to stage an intimate concert at the renovated Kulturpalast in Dresden, which has a capacity of only 1,754 seats. Clapton agreed to close the music festival in June 2019. Due to high ticket demand, the concert was moved to the Messe, which holds 4,000 people. Minutes after the pre-sale began, the concert was sold-out.

On 28 September 2018, it was announced that Clapton would play two additional shows in Germany, including Berlin (Mercedes-Benz-Arena) and Mannheim (SAP Arena) as well as one additional concert in Austria at the Stadthalle in Vienna. On 24 October 2018, Clapton revealed that he would return to the Royal Albert Hall, London for a series of concerts, which would be his only performances in the United Kingdom in 2019. On 18 January 2019, it was announced that Clapton would take up a five-night residency at Tokyo's Nippon Budokan in April. On 28 March 2019, Clapton announced the Crossroads Guitar Festival 2019 as being part of his tour.

On 22 April 2019, Clapton's management announced that the guitarist will play three live shows in the United States ahead of the fifth Crossroads Guitar Festival in California (Chase Center), Nevada (T-Mobile Arena) and Arizona (Talking Stick Resort Arena) from 11 September 2019 through 14 September 2019. CHASE partnered with Clapton for the concert on 11 September 2019, holding an exclusive presale for cardholders. During his shows at the Royal Albert Hall, Clapton decided to pay tribute to Prince, Bob Dylan and Doris Day, covering their songs "Purple Rain", "Alberta" and "Que Sera, Sera".

== Setlist ==
This setlist represents the average setlist of the tour. It does not represent all individual shows throughout the tour.

1. "Pretending"
2. "Key to the Highway"
3. "Hoochie Coochie Man"
4. "I Shot the Sheriff"
5. "Driftin' Blues"*
6. "Nobody Knows You When You're Down and Out"*
7. "Tears in Heaven"*
8. "Running On Faith"*
9. "Layla"*
10. "Tearing Us Apart"
11. "Badge"
12. "Holy Mother"
13. "Cross Road Blues"
14. "Little Queen of Spades"
15. "Cocaine"

Encore

1. "High Time We Went"

* Indicates that the song was played in an acoustic/unplugged arrangement.

== Equipment ==
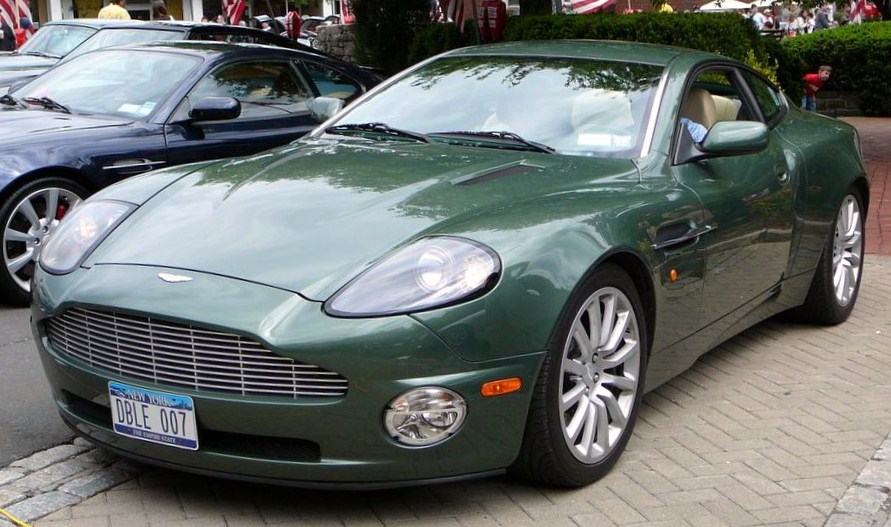
A 2006 Aston Martin Vanquish painted in "Almond Green"

For his 2019 Tokyo residency at the Nippon Budokan, Clapton debuted a new color for his Fender signature model Eric Clapton Stratocaster electric guitar. The color, which is called "Almond Green", was frequently used by British car manufacturer Aston Martin throughout the 2000s and 2010s. The Eric Clapton fan club magazine Where's Eric! noted, that the guitar has model "a much lighter hue than his Strats finished with Porsche and Mercedes car colors". Clapton owned an Aston Martin automobile in the 2000s. During his stint at the Royal Albert Hall in London, Clapton used a Pewter Grey Fender Eric Clapton Stratocaster.

For his unplugged set, Clapton continued to use his signature model OOO-28EC acoustic guitar from Martin Guitars, he played on stage since 2015. However, Where's Eric! noted, that Clapton now uses a small DPA microphone mounted to the pick guard of his close to the bridge of his guitar. For his London shows at the Royal Albert Hall, Clapton was spotted using a Fender '57 tweed Bandmaster reissue model electric guitar amplifier, which is the same model he has used since 2013. Behind the microphoned Bandmaster he kept a spare one (possibly another Bandmaster or maybe a '57 Twin tweed or a Twinolux) as a back-up amplifier. As part of his effects system, the guitarist used a leslie simulator and a distortion effect.

== Personnel ==
The following musicians were part of Clapton's touring band or appeared as special guests.

- Eric Clapton – Guitar, Vocals
- Chris Stainton – Keyboards
- Nathan East – Bass guitar, Background vocals
- Doyle Bramhall II – Rhythm guitar, Background vocals
- Sonny Emory – Drums, Percussion instruments
- Steve Gadd – Drums (11 September 2019)
- Paul Carrack – Keyboards, Background vocals
- Sharon White – Background vocals
- Katie Kissoon – Background vocals
- John Mayer – Guitar, Background vocals (13 April 2019)
- Jimmie Vaughan – Guitar, Background vocals (15, 16 May 2019)
- Kurt Rosenwinkel – Guitar (4 June 2019)
- Jan Vogler – Cello (10 June 2019)

== Tour dates ==
Date	City	Country	Venue	Attendance	Box Office
Asia
13 April 2019	Tokyo	Japan	Nippon Budokan	72,350 / 72,350	$8,712,387
15 April 2019	Tokyo	Japan	Nippon Budokan	72,350 / 72,350	$8,712,387
17 April 2019	Tokyo	Japan	Nippon Budokan	72,350 / 72,350	$8,712,387
18 April 2019	Tokyo	Japan	Nippon Budokan	72,350 / 72,350	$8,712,387
20 April 2019	Tokyo	Japan	Nippon Budokan	72,350 / 72,350	$8,712,387
Europe
13 May 2019	London	England	Royal Albert Hall	15,624 / 15,624	$2,784,980
15 May 2019	London	England	Royal Albert Hall	15,624 / 15,624	$2,784,980
16 May 2019	London	England	Royal Albert Hall	15,624 / 15,624	$2,784,980
4 June 2019	Berlin	Germany	Mercedes-Benz Arena	abt. 12,000	—N/a
6 June 2019	Vienna	Austria	Wiener Stadthalle	abt. 12,000	—N/a
8 June 2019	Mannheim	Germany	SAP Arena	abt. 10,000	—N/a
10 June 2019 (Note: The 10 June 2019 concert at the Messehalle 1 in Dresden, Germany was part of Dresden Music Festival.)	Dresden	Germany	Messehalle 1	4,000 / 4,000	$1,061,960
North America
11 September 2019	San Francisco	United States	Chase Center	—	—
13 September 2019	Las Vegas	United States	T-Mobile Arena	—	—
14 September 2019	Phoenix	United States	Talking Stick Resort Arena	—	—
20 September 2019 (Note: The 20 & 21 September 2019 concerts at the American Airlines Center in Dallas, United States are part of Crossroads Guitar Festival.)	Dallas	United States	American Airlines Center	—	—
21 September 2019	Dallas	United States	American Airlines Center	—	—
TOTAL				+ 125,974	+ $12,559,327
