= Paul Carrack =

British musician (born 1951)

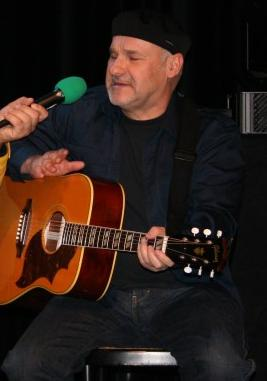
- Carrack in 2009

Background information
- Born: Paul Melvyn Carrack; 22 April 1951 (age 75); Sheffield, South Yorkshire, England
- Genres: Blue-eyed soul; pop rock; soft rock
- Occupations: Musician; singer; songwriter
- Instruments: Vocals; keyboards; guitar; bass
- Works: Discography
- Years active: 1969–present
- Labels: Vertigo; Chrysalis; Columbia; Ark 21; Compass; Carrack-UK
- Formerly of: Warm Dust; Ace; Squeeze; Mike + The Mechanics; the Bleeding Heart Band
- Website: paulcarrack.net

Paul Melvyn Carrack (born 22 April 1951) is an English musician who has recorded as both a solo artist and as a member of several popular bands. The BBC dubbed Carrack "The Man with the Golden Voice", while Record Collector remarked: "If vocal talent equalled financial success, Paul Carrack would be a bigger name than legends such as Phil Collins or Elton John."

Carrack rose to prominence in the mid-1970s as the frontman and principal songwriter of rock band Ace, and gained further recognition for his work as a solo artist and for his tenures as a member of Squeeze and Roger Waters' backing band, the Bleeding Heart Band, intermittently handling lead vocals on Squeeze and Waters recordings. From the mid-1980s to the late 1990s, he enjoyed considerable success as the co-lead vocalist (with Sad Café's Paul Young) and a songwriter for Mike + The Mechanics; following Young's death in 2000, Carrack served as the band's sole lead vocalist until his departure in 2004.

Carrack sang some of his affiliated bands' best-known hits, including Ace's "How Long" (1975); Squeeze's "Tempted" (1981); and Mike + The Mechanics' "Silent Running (On Dangerous Ground)" (1985), "The Living Years" (1988) and "Over My Shoulder" (1995). He also performed lead vocals on tracks from the Roger Waters albums Radio K.A.O.S. (1987) and The Wall – Live in Berlin (1990). He has released nineteen solo albums and achieved a major hit of his own with "Don't Shed a Tear" (1988). Carrack's songs have been recorded by artists such as Linda Ronstadt, the Eagles, Diana Ross, Tom Jones, Michael McDonald and Jools Holland, and he has served as a session or touring musician for Roxy Music, Elton John, Eric Clapton, Ringo Starr, B. B. King, the Pretenders, the Smiths and Madness.

== Career ==
=== 1970s: Warm Dust, Ace and Roxy Music ===
==== Warm Dust ====
Carrack's recording career began with the jazz-rock band Warm Dust, which released three studio albums of original material between 1970 and 1972. Carrack served as the band's keyboardist and occasionally played other instruments. The band's lead vocalist was Les Walker. In addition to Carrack and Walker, the line up also included David Pepper, Alan Solomon, Terry Comer, and John Surguy. The original line-up was made up of Les Dransfield Walker on lead-vocals, harp, guitar, Carrack on organ, piano, guitar, Dave Pepper on drums and Terry Corner on bass, guitar and recorder. While playing the Top Ten club in Hamburg, they met up with John Surgey who played tenor sax and Alan Solomon who played baritone sax who subsequently joined the band.

They played at venues in Germany and their appearances in the UK were considered rare. It was on the continent that they fared better. They even appeared to have upstaged Fleetwood Mac at a concert. Three of their performances were recorded for Beat Club. They were " Indian Rope Man", "Worm Dance Part 1" and "Worm Dance Part 2".

==== Ace ====
After Warm Dust broke up, Carrack and Warm Dust bassist Terry "Tex" Comer helped found the pub rock band Ace. The band's debut single, "How Long", was written and sung by Carrack and was a 1975 hit in both the UK and the United States. The track was Ace's only hit record and in 1977 the group disbanded. Carrack then worked as a backing musician for Frankie Miller and as a keyboardist for Roxy Music.

=== 1980s: working solo and as a session musician ===
Carrack's debut solo studio album, 1980's Nightbird, was not a commercial success.

In 1981, Glenn Tilbrook recruited Carrack to join Squeeze as a replacement for long-time keyboardist Jools Holland. This new Squeeze line-up achieved international success with the studio album East Side Story, with Carrack as vocalist on the song "Tempted", their biggest US hit at the time. However, by 1982, Carrack had left the band and was replaced by keyboardist Don Snow.

Beginning in late 1981, Carrack joined Nick Lowe in a band that featured Lowe, Carrack, Martin Belmont on guitar, James Eller on bass guitar and Bobby Irwin on drums. This band, referred to as Noise to Go, existed to back both Carrack on his solo recordings, and Lowe on his, similar to the arrangement Lowe had with Dave Edmunds and Rockpile in the late 1970s. Noise to Go also backed Lowe's wife Carlene Carter on her 1981 studio album Blue Nun.

Carrack's 1982 solo studio album Suburban Voodoo was produced by Lowe, and featured Noise To Go as accompanists. The album spin off the minor hit single "I Need You" (US #37), written by Carrack, Lowe and Belmont. Eller subsequently left Noise to Go, and Lowe took over bass guitar duties within the band. The band was rechristened Nick Lowe and His Cowboy Outfit, and recorded two studio albums from 1983 to 1985, with Lowe as lead vocalist. The band also backed John Hiatt on side two of Hiatt's 1983 studio album Riding with the King.

During this era, Carrack also worked as a session musician for the Smiths and the Pretenders, but his solo career was essentially on hold.

Nick Lowe and His Cowboy Outfit broke up in 1985, and Carrack was contacted by Mike Rutherford of Genesis who asked him to join Rutherford's new side project, Mike + The Mechanics. Initially, Carrack and Paul Young alternated as lead vocalists for the band. Carrack sang lead on their 1985 hit "Silent Running (On Dangerous Ground)".

In 1986, Carrack became a member of Roger Waters' newly formed backing band, the Bleeding Heart Band, recording tracks for the soundtrack of the animated film When the Wind Blows. The following year, Waters (still accompanied by Carrack and the Bleeding Hearts) released a solo studio album, Radio K.A.O.S. and toured the US and Europe. Carrack often filled in as an unofficial support act on the tour, usually playing "Tempted" to warm up the crowd.

Building on the success of Mike + The Mechanics, Carrack was able to reestablish his solo career in 1987 with the hit studio album One Good Reason, and the accompanying hit single "Don't Shed a Tear", which reached number nine on the Billboard Hot 100. From this point forward and for close to the next 20 years, Carrack consistently maintained both a solo career and a career in Mike + The Mechanics. This band recorded and toured irregularly due to Rutherford's commitments with Genesis.

In 1989, Mike + The Mechanics had a UK number two and US number one hit with "The Living Years", on which Carrack again sang lead. Also in 1989, Carrack recorded "Romance", a duet with Terri Nunn from the Los Angeles-based synth-pop band Berlin. The song appeared on the soundtrack to the film Sing, starring Peter Dobson and Lorraine Bracco.

=== 1990s: solo and collaborations ===
In the 1990s Carrack's solo career went into abeyance for a few years, although he maintained a career as a session musician. He also continued working with Mike + The Mechanics, who recorded throughout the decade. During this time Carrack played keyboards in the band and also began to co-compose, with Rutherford, some of the band's songs.

In 1990, Carrack rejoined Roger Waters for the ground-breaking live stage show of The Wall – Live in Berlin in front of a crowd of 250,000. Carrack sang "Hey You" and was one of the performers on "The Tide Is Turning" with Waters, Joni Mitchell, Cyndi Lauper, Bryan Adams and Van Morrison.

In 1991, Carrack sang the fourth verse on Paul Young's cover version of the Crowded House hit "Don't Dream It's Over", released on Young's compilation album From Time to Time – The Singles Collection.

In 1993, Carrack joined with bassist Tony Levin, drummer Steve Ferrone, guitarist Phil Palmer and keyboardist and producer Rupert Hine to form a band known as Spin 1ne 2wo. They released one album, a self-titled project, made up of classic rock covers including songs by Jimi Hendrix, the Who, Led Zeppelin, Blind Faith, Steely Dan and Bob Dylan.

Carrack dueted with Beth Nielsen Chapman on the 1993 single "In the Time It Takes". Also in 1993, Carrack rejoined Squeeze for the band's tenth studio album Some Fantastic Place and a subsequent tour. With Carrack on vocals, the band re-recorded their hit "Tempted" for the soundtrack to the film Reality Bites (1994). Carrack once again left Squeeze, however, after about a year.

Following his second stint with Squeeze, Carrack joined forces with Timothy B. Schmit and Don Felder of the Eagles for an ambitious, but ultimately unrealised, recording project. Schmit and Felder soon reunited with the rest of the Eagles and their Hell Freezes Over live album/studio album, bringing with them one of the songs Carrack had co-written, "Love Will Keep Us Alive." It was recorded by the Eagles and won an ASCAP award as being the most-played song in the US in 1995. The same year, Mike + The Mechanics scored yet another top 20 hit, "Over My Shoulder". It not only featured Carrack on lead vocals, but was the first Mechanics hit to be co-written by him.

In 1996, Carrack resumed his solo career with the studio album Blue Views. He also recorded a song called "Déjà Vu" on Steve Hackett's album Genesis Revisited. This song was co-written by ex-Genesis members Hackett and Peter Gabriel. Carrack also contributed Hammond organ parts to four songs on Ezio's 2000 studio album Higher.

=== 2000–present ===
Carrack maintains an active solo career, as well as his career as a session musician and songwriter, touring solo in 2002, mostly opening for bands such as Supertramp. He also served as the sole lead vocalist for Mike + The Mechanics following the death of Paul Young in 2000. In 2003 Carrack toured with Ringo Starr & His All-Starr Band performing his hit songs including "How Long?", "Tempted" and "The Living Years". In 2004, Carrack left the Mechanics following the release of Rewired, their only studio album with Carrack as sole lead vocalist. After a lull in Carrack's career, in 2007 the Eagles covered Carrack's "I Don't Want to Hear Anymore" on their long-awaited reunion album Long Road Out of Eden. The album went to number one in the US, UK, Australia, New Zealand and several other countries.

In September 2004, Carrack joined with other notable artists for The Strat Pack concert at Wembley, celebrating the 50th anniversary of the Fender Stratocaster. Carrack delivered vocal performances on "How Long?", Bob Dylan's "All Along the Watchtower", the Beatles' "While My Guitar Gently Weeps", and Genesis's "I Can't Dance".

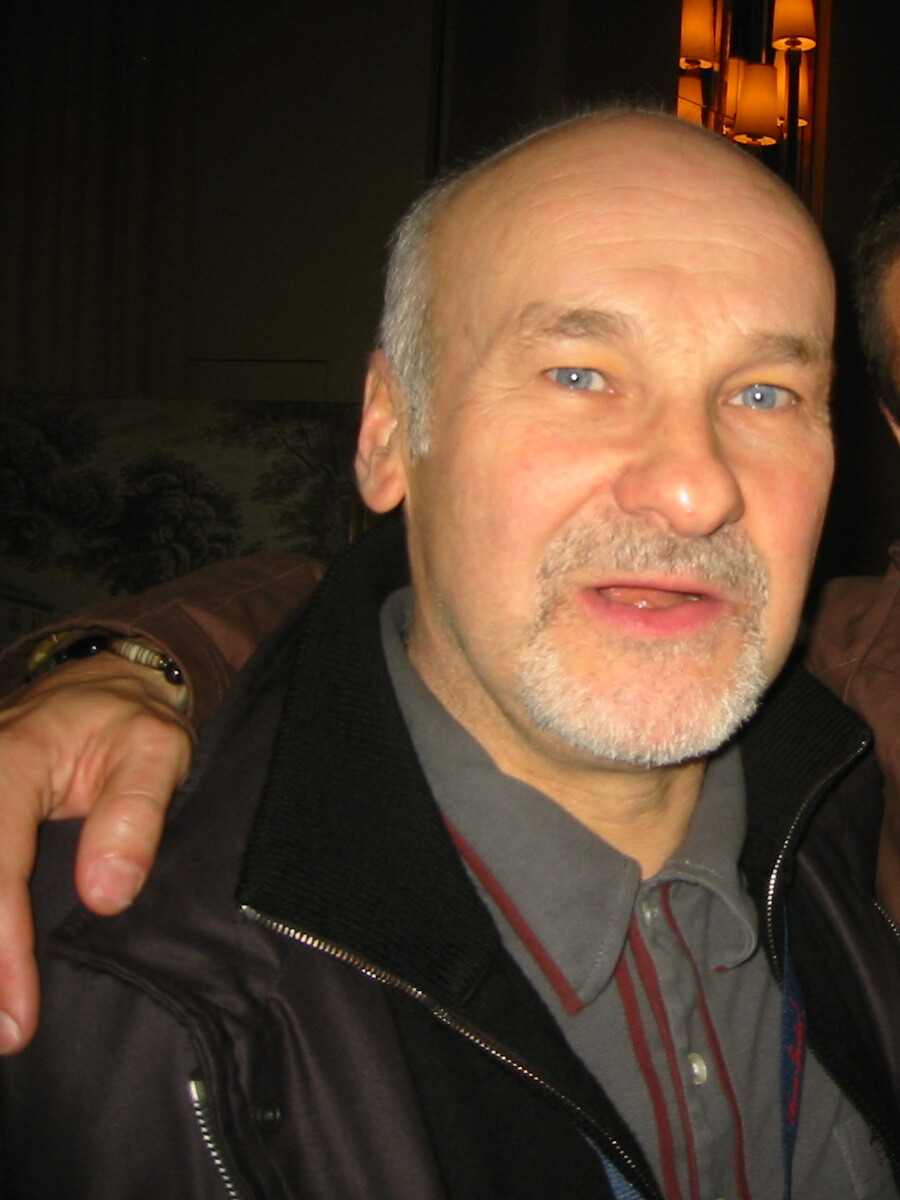
Carrack in 2008

In May 2009, Carrack embarked on a tour of Germany, supported by Canadian artist Brendan Croskerry. In 2010, Carrack released the studio album A Different Hat, with the Royal Philharmonic Orchestra, arranged by David Cullen. Two years later in 2012, Carrack returned with the soul-inspired studio album Good Feeling.

In 2012, Carrack was the subject of an hour-long BBC Four television documentary Paul Carrack: The Man with the Golden Voice. In the same year, Carrack was one of the recipients of the BASCA Gold Badge Award in recognition of his unique contribution to music.

In February 2013, Carrack participated in Eric Clapton's 50th anniversary tour, celebrating the 50th year that Clapton had been a professional musician. Carrack sang lead vocals on "Tempted", "How Long", and closed the show with "High Time We Went".

He also in 2013, took part in the BBC Four programme Please Please Me: Remaking a Classic to celebrate 50 years since the Beatles debut studio album, where he recorded his own version of "Misery".

In May 2015, Carrack helped Clapton celebrate his 70th birthday with a concert held at Madison Square Garden on 1 and 3 May, along with the other members of Clapton's band. The birthday celebration continued later in May at the Royal Albert Hall in the UK. In 2019, Carrack played Hammond organ and sang on Clapton's Live in Concert 2019 world tour, playing their first-ever concert in Dresden, Germany as part of the Dresden Music Festival.

On 19 February 2021, a new single "You're Not Alone" was released across all digital platforms via Carrack's own independent label Carrack-UK. It was also announced that a new studio album, One on One, would be issued in June 2021. After Carrack contracted shingles in the spring, delaying the album's completion, the release date was pushed back to 17 September.

On the BBC's 2024 Jools' Annual Hootenanny he performed "Over My Shoulder" with Jools Holland and the band.

In July 2025, Carrack released his first country album, titled The Country Side of Paul Carrack Vol. 1.

=== Session work ===
Carrack's distinctive voice and keyboard skills have kept him in demand as a session musician on many projects. Some of his credits include:

- Synthesizer, organ, and piano on Roxy Music's studio albums Manifesto (1979), Flesh + Blood (1980), and Avalon (1982)
- Piano on the Pretenders studio album Learning to Crawl (1983)
- Keyboards on the Smiths' eponymous debut studio album, The Smiths (1984)
- Lead vocals on Roger Waters' Radio K.A.O.S. (1987); keyboards and vocals on its subsequent tour
- Organ on Elton John's Made in England (1995) and The Big Picture (1997)
- Organ and vocals on B.B. King's studio album Deuces Wild (1997)
- Keyboards on Simply Red's studio album Blue (1998)
- Touring with Ringo Starr's All-Starr Band (2003)

In 1997, Carrack played organ for Elton John on the single "Something About the Way You Look Tonight". It was coupled with "Candle in the Wind 1997" on a double A-sided single, which set a new record for best selling single of all time.

== Discography ==
Studio albums

=== With Warm Dust ===
- And It Came to Pass (1970)
- Peace for Our Time (1970)
- Warm Dust (a.k.a. Third Album) (1972)

=== With Ace ===
- Five-A-Side (1974)
- Time for Another (1975)
- No Strings (1977)

=== With Squeeze ===
- East Side Story (1981)
- Some Fantastic Place (1993)
- Spot the Difference (2010) – Vocals and keyboards on "Tempted" re-recording.

=== With Mike and the Mechanics ===
- Mike + The Mechanics (1985)
- Living Years (1988)
- Word of Mouth (1991)
- Beggar on a Beach of Gold (1995)
- Mike & The Mechanics (a.k.a. M6) (1999)
- Rewired (2004)

=== Solo ===
- Nightbird (1980)
- Suburban Voodoo (1982)
- One Good Reason (1987)
- Groove Approved (1989)
- Blue Views (1995)
- Beautiful World (1997)
- Satisfy My Soul (2000)
- Groovin' (2001)
- It Ain't Over (2003)
- Winter Wonderland (a.k.a. A Soulful Christmas) (2005)
- Old, New, Borrowed and Blue (2007)
- I Know That Name (2008)
- A Different Hat (2010)
- Good Feeling (2012)
- Rain or Shine (2013)
- Soul Shadows (2016)
- These Days (2018)
- One on One (2021)
- Don't Wait too Long (2023)
- The Country Side of Paul Carrack (2025)
- The Country Side of Paul Carrack Vol. 2 (2026)
