= I Know That Name =

Studio album by Paul Carrack
- Released: 2008
- Studios: RAK Studios (London, UK); Beat Poets Studio (France)
- Genres: Pop rock; soft rock
- Length: 47:14
- Label: Carrack-UK
- Producer: Paul Carrack (track 1 produced by Peter Collins)

Paul Carrack chronology
Old, New, Borrowed, and Blue (2007)	I Know That Name (2008)	A Different Hat (2010)

I Know That Name is the twelfth solo studio album by the English singer-songwriter Paul Carrack. It was originally released in 2008 on Carrack's own Carrack-UK label.

A reissue billed as the "Ultimate Version" was released in 2014. This reissue featured two additional tracks, replaced six tracks with newly remixed versions, and altered the running order.

Carrack originally recorded the song "Eyes Of Blue" on his 1996 album Blue Views. The version on I Know That Name is an entirely new recording.

== Reception ==
Professional ratings
Review scores
Source	Rating
AllMusic	3.5/5 stars
Record Collector	3/5 stars

AllMusic's Stephen Thomas Erlewine opines: "I Know That Name glides by on a mellow, soulful groove ... It's easy-rolling and even-handed, offering no surprises but plenty of comfort if you've ever been a fan of any of Carrack's work over the years."

William Pinfold of Record Collector notes that I Know That Name "should further bolster [Carrack's] reputation as a first-rate singer, songwriter and keyboardist...an album of mature, well-performed modern soul and soft rock."

== Track listing ==
No.	Title	Writer(s)	Length
1.	"Ain't No Love in the Heart of the City"	Michael Price, Dan Walsh	3:42
2.	"I Don't Want To Hear Any More"	Paul Carrack	4:07
3.	"It Ain't Easy (To Love Somebody)"	Carrack	3:56
4.	"No Doubt About It"	Carrack	4:05
5.	"I Don't Want Your Love (I Need Your Love)"	Carrack	4:02
6.	"Stay Awake (I'm Coming Home)"	Carrack, Chris Difford	4:12
7.	"Just 4 Tonite"	Carrack	3:36
8.	"Love Is Thicker Than Water"	Carrack, Difford	4:14
9.	"If I Didn't Love You"	Carrack	4:10
10.	"Who Am I?"	Carrack	4:05
11.	"Eyes Of Blue"	Carrack	3:58
12.	"Am I In That Dream?"	Carrack, Difford	3:58

I Know That Name - Ultimate Version (2014)
No.	Title	Writer(s)	Length
1.	"No Doubt About It" (single remix)	Paul Carrack
2.	"I Don’t Want To Hear Any More" (single remix)	Carrack
3.	"It Ain’t Easy (To Love Somebody)"	Carrack
4.	"I Don’t Want Your Love (I Need Your Love)" (single remix)	Carrack
5.	"Ain’t No Love In The Heart Of The City" (single remix)	Michael Price, Dan Walsh
6.	"Stay Awake (I’m Coming Home)"	Carrack, Chris Difford
7.	"Soul To Soul" (new track)	Brian O'Doherty
8.	"Just 4 Tonite" (single remix)	Carrack
9.	"Love Is Thicker Than Water"	Carrack, Difford
10.	"If I Didn’t Love You" (single remix)	Carrack
11.	"Who Am I?"	Carrack
12.	"Eyes Of Blue"	Carrack
13.	"Am I In That Dream?"	Carrack, Difford
14.	"He Ain't Heavy, He's My Brother" (new track)	Bobby Scott, Bob Russell

== Personnel ==
Track numbers refer to the original 2008 issue.

- Paul Carrack – vocals, additional Hammond B3 organ (1), all other instruments (2–6, 8, 9, 12), clavinet (7), horn arrangements (7, 11), all instruments (10)
- Mike Rohaus – Wurlitzer electric piano (1), clavinet (1), Hammond B3 organ (1)
- Michael Martin – keyboards (7), rhythm section (7), basic track arrangements (7, 11), horn arrangements (7, 11)
- Carlton "Bubblers" Ogilvie – keyboards (7), rhythm section (7)
- Robert McNally – guitars (1)
- Stanley Andrews – guitars (7)
- Craig Young – bass (1)
- Colin McNeish – bass (7)
- Chad Cromwell – drums (1)
- Brian Pruitt – drum programming (1)
- Al Shux – additional drum programming (1)
- LilI Yoncheva – percussion (7)
- Mark Douthit – baritone saxophone (1), tenor saxophone (1)
- Steve Beighton – saxophones (2–4, 6, 8, 9, 12)
- Brian Edwards – saxophones (7)
- Barry Green – trombone (1)
- Henry Tenyue – trombone (7)
- Quentin Ware – trumpet (1), horn arrangements (1)
- Patrick Tenyue – trumpet (7)
- Ed Collins – trumpet (2–4, 6, 8, 9), flugelhorn (12)
- John Catchings – cello (1)
- Kristin Wilkinson – viola (1)
- David Angell – violin (1)
- David Davidson – violin (1), string arrangements (1)
- Chris Pelcer – string arrangements (1)
- Drea Rhenee – backing vocals (1)
- Jackie Wilson – backing vocals (1)
- Don Henley – backing vocals (2)
- Timothy B. Schmit – backing vocals (2)
- Lindsay Dracass – backing vocals (3, 4, 6, 8, 9)
- Sam Moore – guest vocals (8)

Production

- Dave Robinson – executive producer, photography
- Peter Collins – producer (1)
- Paul Carrack – producer (2–12)
- Bobby Shin – horn and string engineer (1)
- Ren Swan – mixing (1, 2)
- Richard Woodcraft – mixing (3–9, 11)
- Nigel Bates – mixing (10, 12)
- Jeff Mortimer – mastering
- Ian Ross – design, photography
- Alan Wood – tour management
