= Chase Center =

Indoor arena in San Francisco, California, US

- Ballhalla

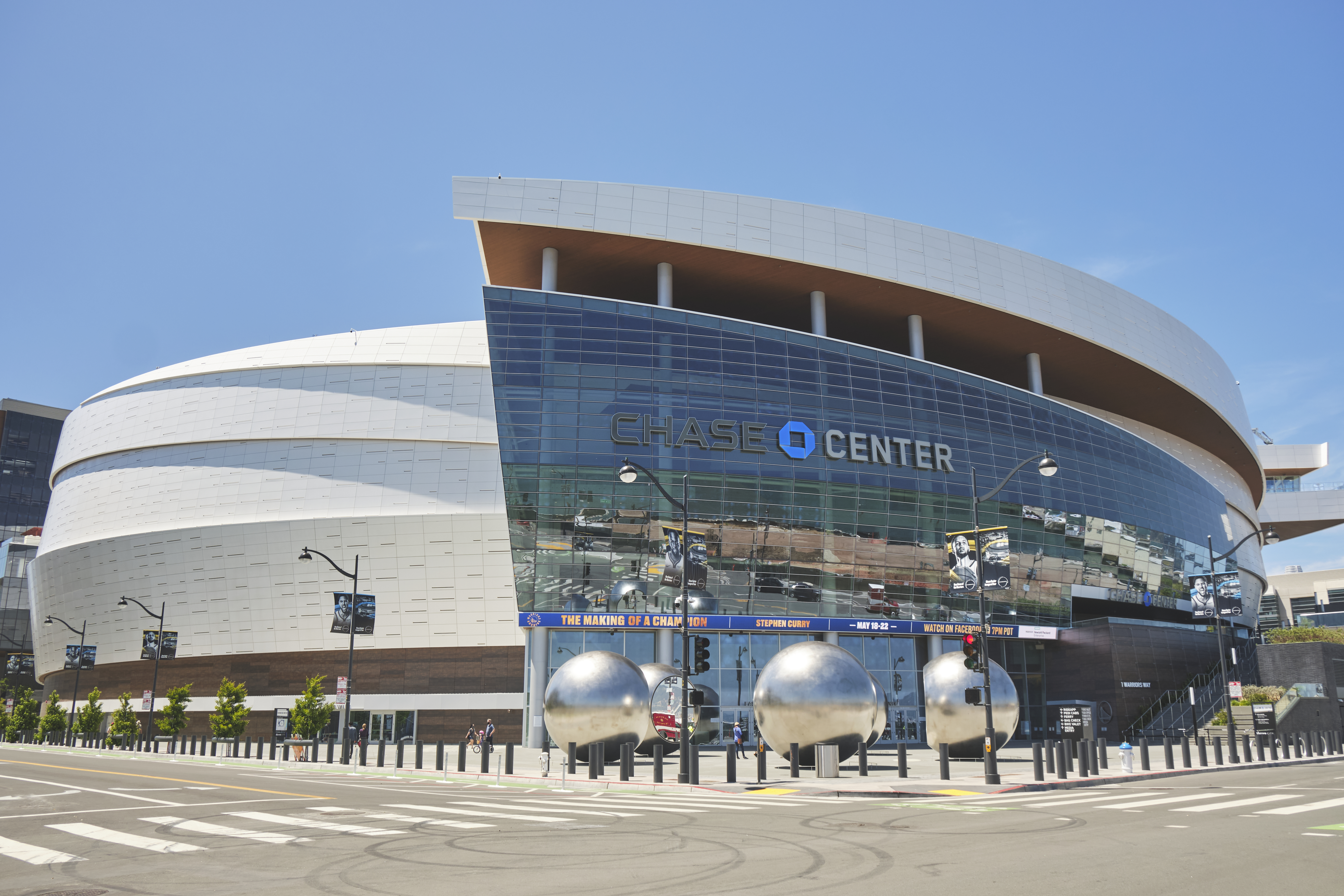
- Chase Center in 2020

- Location in San Francisco Location in California Location in the United States
- Address: 1 Warriors Way
- Location: San Francisco, California, U.S.
- Coordinates: 37°46′05″N 122°23′15″W
- Capacity: Basketball: 18,064; Concerts: 19,500
- Type: Arena
- Field size: 900,000 sq ft (84,000 m^{2})
- Public transit: UCSF/Chase Center; Golden Gate Ferry: Larkspur; San Francisco Bay Ferry: Alameda, Oakland, South SF

Construction
- Groundbreaking: January 17, 2017
- Opened: September 6, 2019
- Cost: US$1.4 billion (US$1.76 billion in 2025 dollars)
- Architects: MANICA Architecture (design); Gensler (interiors)
- Structural engineer: Magnusson Klemencic Associates
- Services engineers: Smith Seckman Reid, Inc.
- General contractors: Clark Construction Group; Mortenson Construction

Tenants
- Golden State Warriors (NBA) (2019–present); Golden State Valkyries (WNBA) (2025–present); San Francisco Dons (NCAA) (2019–present) (Note: Select games)

Website
- chasecenter.com

Chase Center is a multi-purpose indoor arena in the Mission Bay neighborhood of San Francisco, California, United States.

It is the home of the Golden State Warriors of the National Basketball Association (NBA), Golden State Valkyries of the Women's National Basketball Association (WNBA), and occasionally for the University of San Francisco men's and women's basketball teams in the National Collegiate Athletic Association (NCAA). The Santa Cruz Warriors of the NBA G League play one home game per season at Chase Center. Chase Center opened on September 6, 2019, and seats 18,064 for basketball games.

The Warriors, who have been located in the San Francisco Bay Area since 1962, played their home games at Oakland Arena in Oakland from 1971 to 2019 (except 1996–97, when the franchise temporarily relocated to the SAP Center in San Jose while the Oakland Arena was under renovation).

During Valkyries games, Chase Center is nicknamed "Ballhalla", a reference to Valhalla of Norse mythology, where Valkyries would bring select fallen warriors. The arena also includes the Warriors’ practice facility known as the Oracle Performance Center.

The Chase Center is the second youngest arena in the NBA, after the Intuit Dome in Inglewood, California.

== Location and design ==
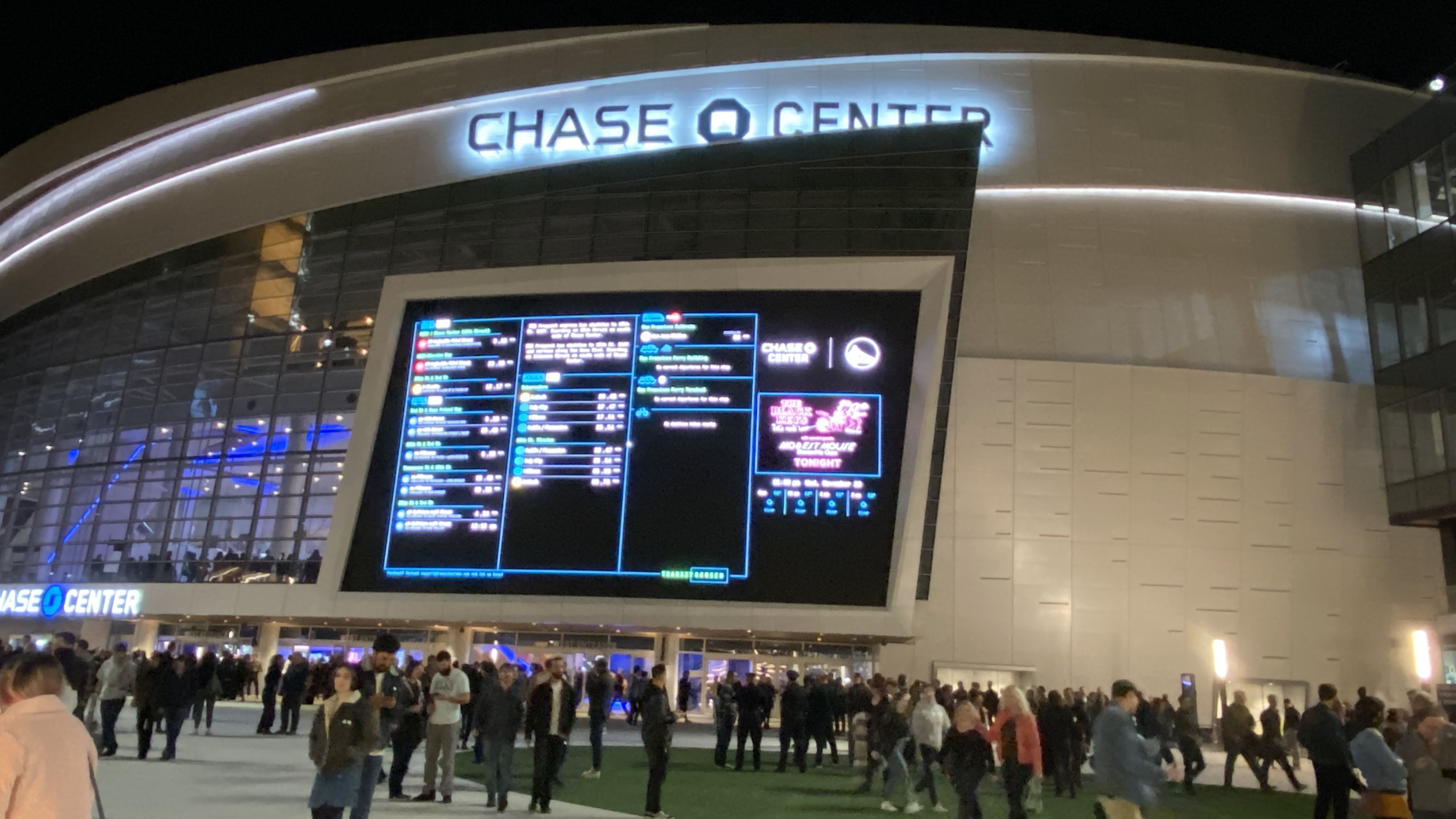
Chase Center exterior, showing upcoming tournaments and concerts on a screen, November 20, 2019.

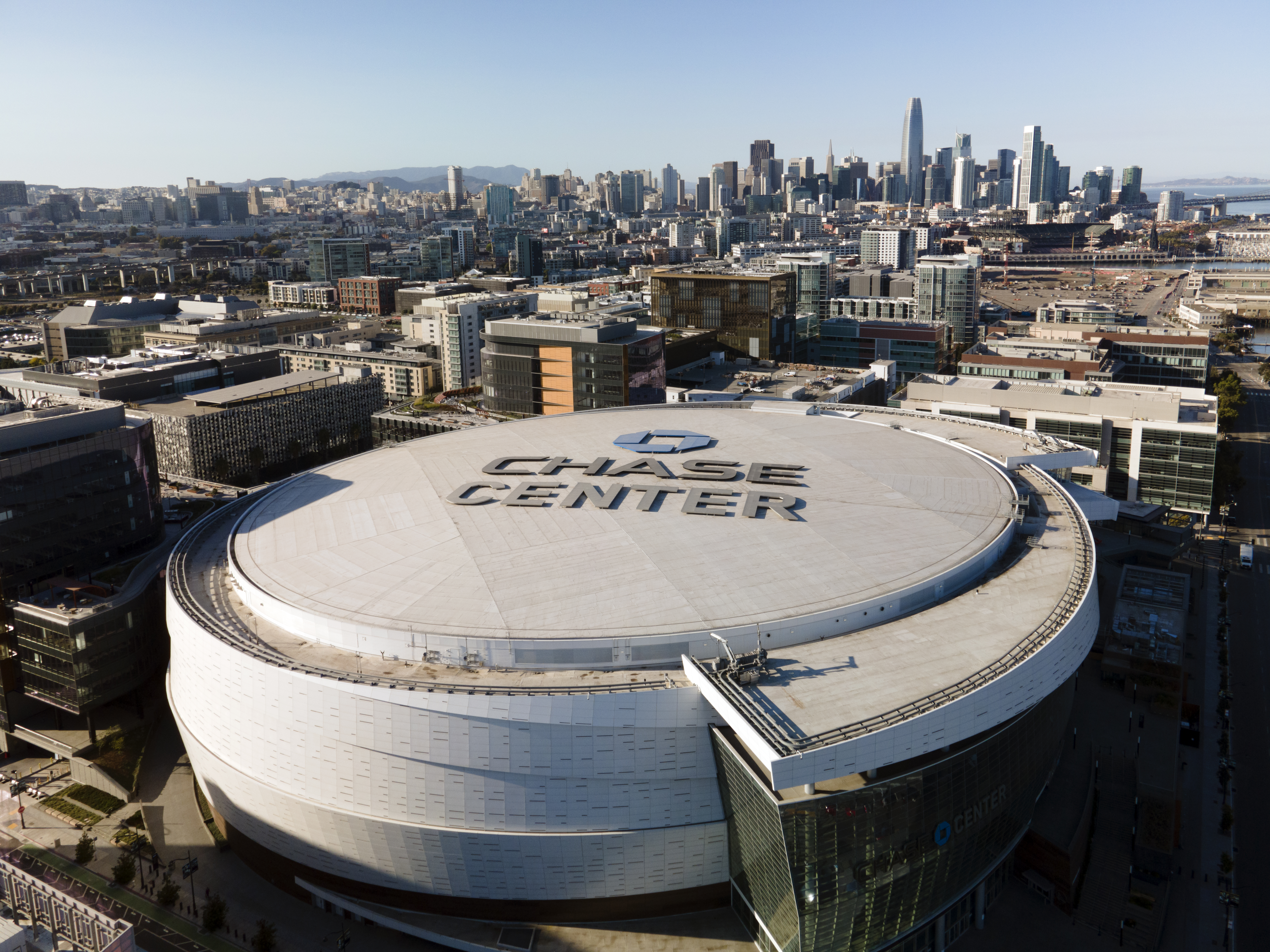
October 2020 aerial view of Chase Center with downtown San Francisco in the distance.

The arena, which is home to the Golden State Warriors of the NBA and Golden State Valkyries of the WNBA, is located in San Francisco at Third St. and 16th St. The arena is composed of multiple layers and floors, has a seating capacity of 18,064 and a multipurpose area that includes a theater configuration with an entrance overlooking a newly built park. The venue also contains 580,000 square feet (54,000 m^{2}) of office and lab space and has 100,000 square feet (9,300 m^{2}) of retail space. Chase Center also includes a 35,000 square foot public plaza and recreation area designed by landscape architecture firm SWA Group. The arena includes a parking facility of approximately 950 spaces and is accessible to public transportation around the area, including one light rail and two crosstown bus lines within two blocks, and a ferryboat landing and regional commuter rail station within a ten-minute walk.

The UCSF/Chase Center station is located adjacent to the arena on the T Third Street light rail line. In 2023, San Francisco Municipal Railway (Muni) opened the Central Subway. This new light rail subway line links the arena and the University of California, San Francisco (UCSF) to downtown hotels, convention centers, the residential neighborhood of Chinatown, and subway and commuter rail lines that serve the entire Bay Area. With a $1 billion investment, Chase Center anchors an 11-acre site that aside from the arena comprises cafés, offices, public plazas and a five-and-a-half-acre public waterfront park.

== Development ==
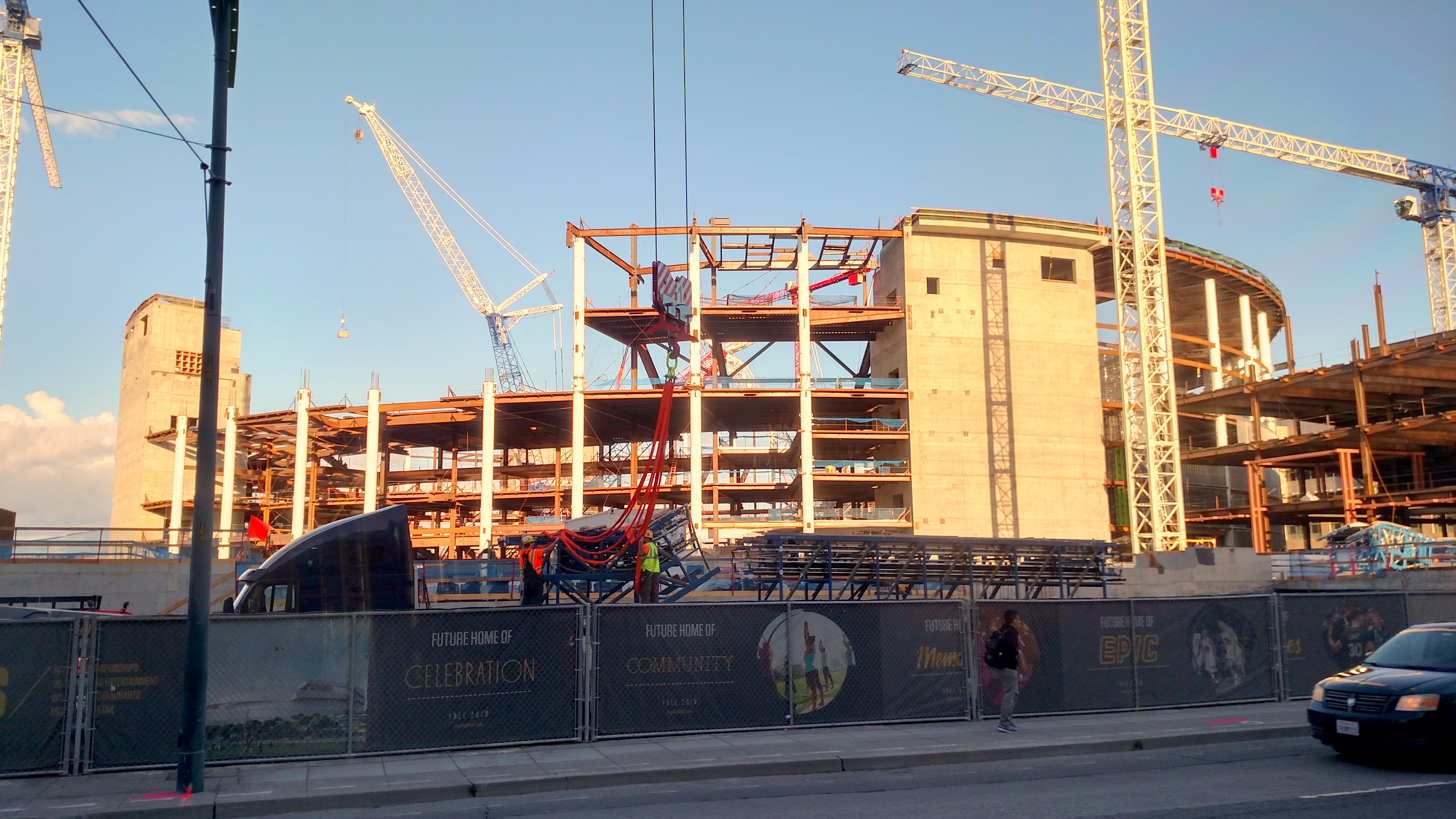
Under construction in April 2018

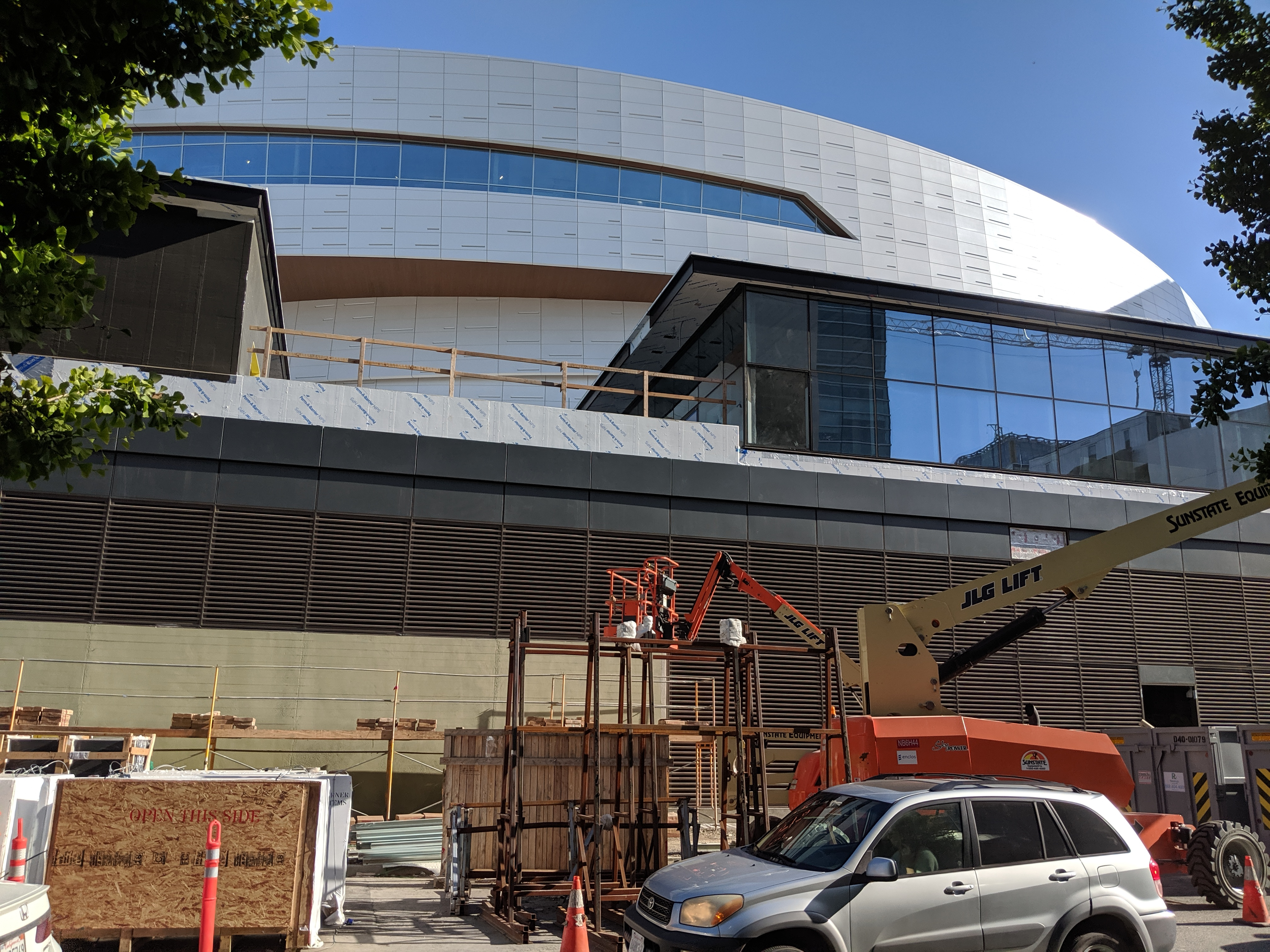
Under construction in May 2019

The plan for building a new arena was announced on May 22, 2012, at a Golden State Warriors press conference at the proposed site, attended by then-San Francisco Mayor Ed Lee, then-NBA Commissioner David Stern, then-California Lt. Governor Gavin Newsom, owners Joe Lacob and Peter Guber, and Warriors staff and city officials. A new privately financed, $500 million 17,000- to 19,000-seat arena was planned to be located on Pier 30-32 along the San Francisco Bay waterfront, situated between the San Francisco Ferry Building and Oracle Park. A month after the proposal, the South Beach-Rincon-Mission Bay Neighborhood Association criticized the site and said that a second major league sport venue in the area would make it no longer "family friendly". Former San Francisco mayor Art Agnos began speaking to dozens of community gatherings in opposition to the proposed arena, stating that the project was pushed by two out-of-town billionaires and would severely impact traffic and city views. On December 30, 2013, a ballot proposition was submitted to the city titled the "Waterfront Height Limit Right to Vote Act". The initiative made it onto the June 2014 ballot as Proposition B, and its passage would affect three major waterfront developments, including the proposed Warriors arena.

On April 19, 2014, the Warriors abandoned plans for the pier site and purchased a 12-acre site owned by Salesforce.com at the Mission Bay neighborhood for an undisclosed amount. The arena was financed privately. The architect for the project was MANICA Architecture, with Kendall Heaton Associates as architect of record, Gensler as interior designer, and Magnusson Klemencic Associates as structural engineer. Construction management was handled by a joint venture between Clark Construction Group and Mortenson Construction, with Jim McLamb serving as project director, Vic Watson as vice president overseeing the project, and Trevor DeLong as senior superintendent in charge of field operations. Derek Cunz, vice president and general manager of Mortenson's Sports Group, and Steve Dell'Orto, senior vice president of Clark Construction Group, led their respective firms' involvement. Brian Nahas served as Mortenson's senior integrated construction manager and VDC lead, while Rolando Mendoza served as the company's Director of Virtual Design and Construction. The plan for Chase Center was to have it built by 2019 before the NBA season started. The plan for Chase Center to open earlier was pushed back multiple times due to many complaints about the location. Construction on the arena began in January 2017.

In April 2015, the Mission Bay site was opposed by the Mission Bay Alliance, which cited traffic, lack of parking, and use of space that could go to UCSF expansion among other things as their reasons for opposition. Their complaint was that the arena would be located near UCSF Benioff Children's Hospital and would create more traffic. To avoid the plan to build Chase Center being voided, representatives of the project worked to address these issues such as traffic and parking.

On January 28, 2016, it was announced that JPMorgan Chase had purchased the naming rights of the arena and that it would be known as Chase Center.

The Golden State Warriors had the official groundbreaking ceremony for Chase Center on January 17, 2017.

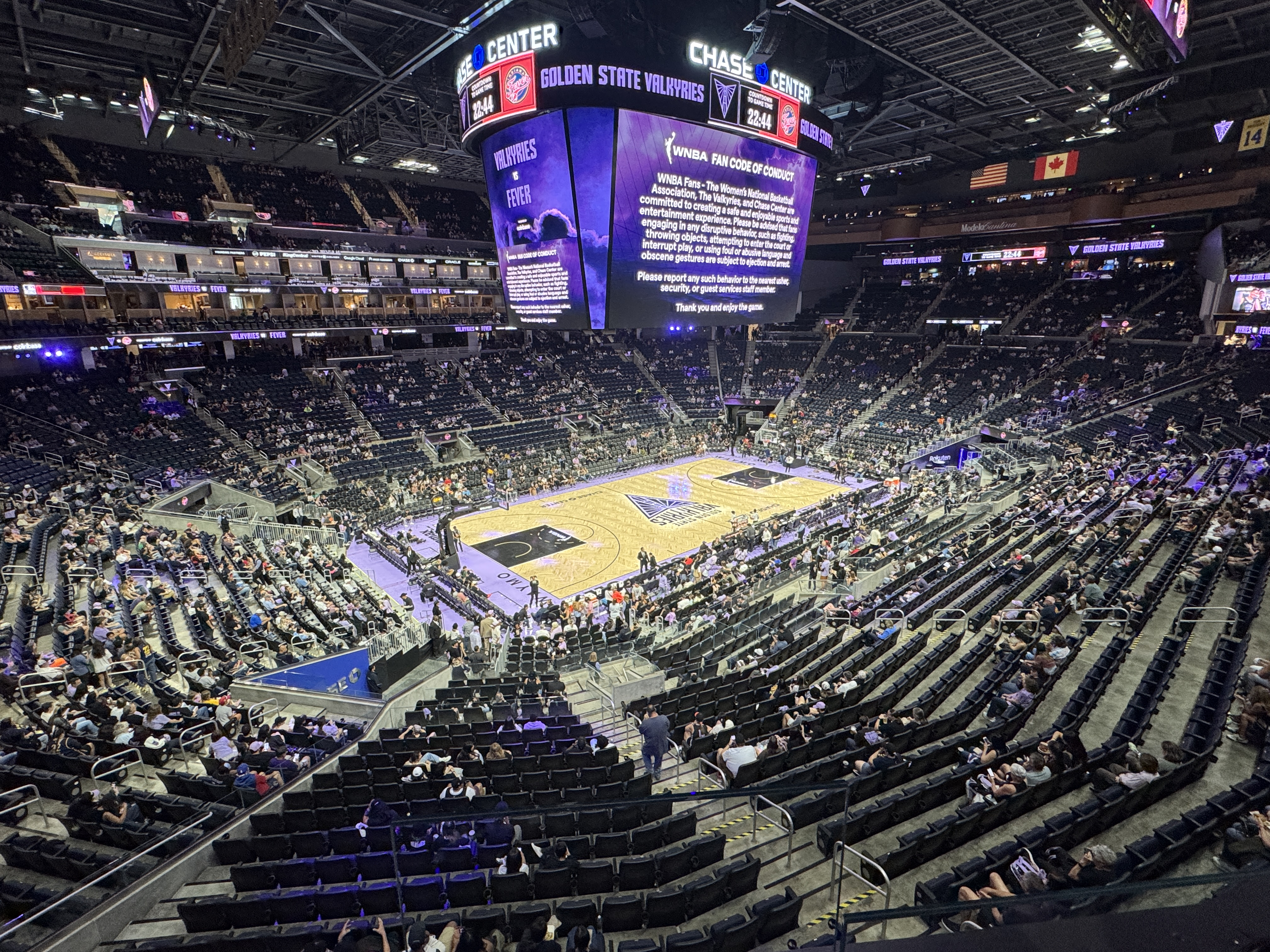
The arena floor of Chase Center before the Indiana Fever vs. the Golden State Valkyries game on Aug. 31, 2025.

== Opening ==
The arena had its grand opening on September 6, 2019, with a concert by Metallica and the San Francisco Symphony. The first preseason game at Chase Center took place on October 5, 2019, as the Warriors lost to the Los Angeles Lakers, 123–101. The Warriors played their first regular season game there with a 141–122 loss against the Los Angeles Clippers on October 24, 2019.

== Controversies ==
=== Construction and location ===
Many longtime Oakland residents felt that constructing a new arena for the Warriors is a manifestation of the phenomenon of gentrification. Additionally, many who supported the Warriors throughout their years at Oracle Arena feel betrayed by the team's decision to relocate to San Francisco. There is also the issue of public costs associated with the new arena, both in San Francisco and Oakland.

In the 2018 San Francisco elections, Proposition I was placed on the ballot as "an initiative to discourage the relocation of established sports teams" in direct response to the proposed move of the Warriors from Oakland to San Francisco. Though meant to block the move, the terms of this proposed law were non-binding. Proposition I was defeated on June 5, 2018 after receiving 97,863 votes for the measure compared with 130,916 votes against.

=== Impact of the COVID-19 pandemic ===
On March 11, 2020, the City of San Francisco announced a temporary ban on public events and gatherings with over 1,000 people due to the ongoing COVID-19 pandemic. Due to this ban, the Warriors announced that their home games would be played without fans, beginning with the March 12 game against the Brooklyn Nets. However, that same day, one day before the game was scheduled to be played, the NBA announced that it would indefinitely suspend the rest of the 2019–20 season due to the outbreak after Rudy Gobert tested positive for the virus.

=== Phish concert fall incidents ===
At a concert by the band Phish on October 17, 2021, an individual fell from an upper level of Chase Center and died from his injuries. Two other fans were also injured in a fall incident at the venue during the same concert and both survived with non-life-threatening injuries. Several Phish fans who attended the band's two concerts at the venue told local media that they were concerned about the design and safety of barriers and railings that separated the levels of the arena. The San Francisco Department of Building Inspection inspected the arena following an anonymous complaint about the low balcony guardrails and steep staircases that was filed after the concert. On October 21, building inspectors deemed Chase Center to be compliant with city building codes.

== Notable events ==
=== NBA Finals ===
The arena hosted the 2022 NBA Finals in which the Warriors won after defeating the Boston Celtics in six games to win their seventh franchise championship.

=== WNBA Finals ===
The arena hosted the 2026 WNBA Finals in which the Valkyries won after defeating the Atlanta Dream in seven games to win their first franchise championship.

=== 2025 NBA All-Star Game ===
The arena hosted the 2025 NBA All-Star Game on February 16, 2025.

=== 2027 WNBA All-Star Game ===
The arena will host the 2027 WNBA All-Star Game on July 31, 2027.

=== College basketball ===
The University of San Francisco men's and women's basketball teams play a game at Chase Center annually. The National Collegiate Athletic Association (NCAA) announced San Francisco as the host city for the West Regional semifinals and finals of the 2022 NCAA Division I men's basketball tournament on March 24 and 26, 2022. The arena was selected to host the West Regional semifinals and finals for the NCAA Division I men's basketball tournament in 2025 and 2028.

| Date | Winning team | Result | Losing team | Game | Attendance |
|---|---|---|---|---|---|
| November 9, 2019 | 3 Stanford Cardinal (Women's) | 97–71 | San Francisco Dons (Women's) | | 3,025 |
| November 9, 2019 | San Francisco Dons | 87–72 | Princeton Tigers | | 6,892 |
| December 21, 2019 | Stanford Cardinal | 62–59 | San Diego Toreros | Al Attles Classic | 3,586 |
| December 21, 2019 | Boston College Eagles | 64–60 | California Golden Bears | Al Attles Classic | 6,209 |
| December 21, 2019 | Saint Mary's Gaels | 68–63 | Nevada Wolf Pack | Al Attles Classic | 6,728 |
| November 13, 2021 | California Golden Bears (Women's) | 70–41 | San Francisco Dons (Women's) | Chase Center Showcase | 2,057 |
| November 13, 2021 | San Francisco Dons | 65–60 | Davidson Wildcats | Chase Center Showcase | 4,175 |
| March 24, 2022 | W4 Arkansas Razorbacks | 74–68 | W1 Gonzaga Bulldogs | 2022 NCAA Division I men's basketball tournament | 17,514 |
| March 24, 2022 | W2 Duke Blue Devils | 78–70 | W3 Texas Tech Red Raiders | 2022 NCAA Division I men's basketball tournament | 17,514 |
| March 26, 2022 | W2 Duke Blue Devils | 78–69 | W4 Arkansas Razorbacks | 2022 NCAA Division I men's basketball tournament | 17,739 |
| December 4, 2022 | San Francisco Dons (Women's) | 65–56 | San Diego State Aztecs (Women's) | | |
| December 4, 2022 | Utah State Aggies | 82–64 | San Francisco Dons | | |
| November 26, 2023 | Colorado State Rams (Women's) | 62–53 | San Francisco Dons (Women's) | | |
| November 26, 2023 | San Francisco Dons | 75–58 | Minnesota Golden Gophers | | 3,682 |
| February 29, 2024 | 23 Gonzaga Bulldogs | 86–68 | San Francisco Dons | | 6,480 |
| November 21, 2024 | Boise State Broncos (Women's) | 59–57 | San Francisco Dons (Women's) | USF Legacy Showcase | 453 |
| November 21, 2024 | Memphis Tigers | 68–64 | San Francisco Dons | USF Legacy Showcase | |
| December 20, 2024 | 11 Ohio State Buckeyes (Women's) | 84–59 | Stanford Cadinal (Women's) | Invisalign Bay Area Women's Classic | 3,766 |
| December 20, 2024 | 1 UCLA Bruins (Women's) | 70–41 | Creighton Bluejays (Women's) | Invisalign Bay Area Women's Classic | 3,766 |
| March 1, 2025 | Gonzaga Bulldogs | 95–75 | San Francisco Dons | | 6,374 |
| March 27, 2025 | W1 Florida Gators | 87–71 | W4 Maryland Terrapins | 2025 NCAA Division I men's basketball tournament | 16,417 |
| March 27, 2025 | W3 Texas Tech Red Raiders | 85–83^{OT} | W10 Arkansas Razorbacks | 2025 NCAA Division I men's basketball tournament | 16,417 |
| March 29, 2025 | W1 Florida Gators | 84–79 | W3 Texas Tech Red Raiders | 2025 NCAA Division I men's basketball tournament | 16,778 |
| November 25, 2025 | California Golden Bears | 80–72 | 18 UCLA Bruins | Empire Classic | 7,293 |
| December 17, 2025 | San Francisco Dons (Women's) | 61–55 | Sacramento State Hornets (Women's) | | 219 |
| December 17, 2025 | San Francisco Dons | 75–58 | Loyola Chicago Ramblers | | 2,784 |
| December 21, 2025 | Stanford Cardinal (Women's) | 64–53 | Oregon Ducks (Women's) | Invisalign Bay Area Women's Classic | 6,258 |
| December 21, 2025 | 19 USC Trojans (Women's) | 61–57 | California Golden Bears (Women's) | Invisalign Bay Area Women's Classic | 6,258 |
| February 18, 2026 | 11 Gonzaga Bulldogs | 80–59 | San Francisco Dons | | 3,848 |

=== Professional wrestling events ===
Chase Center has hosted 4 professional wrestling events:

- WWE Raw, September 23, 2019 and October 11, 2021
- WWE SmackDown, September 24, 2019 (this was the final SmackDown event to air Tuesday nights on the USA Network before its move to Fox on Friday nights the following week)
- AEW held their 4th annual Revolution PPV event on March 5, 2023.

=== Boxing ===
Devin Haney vs. Regis Prograis was held in Chase Center.

=== Esports ===
The 2022 League of Legends World Championship final was held at Chase Center on 5 November 2022. Championship Sunday for the 2026 Pokémon World Championships will be held at the arena on 30 August 2026 after the first two days at the Moscone Center.

=== Tennis ===
The 2025 Laver Cup took place at Chase Center from September 19 to 21, 2025. The event forced the Valkyries to play their first home game of the 2025 WNBA playoffs at SAP Center in San Jose, on September 17.

== Concerts ==
| Date | Artist | Opening act(s) | Tour / Concert name | Attendance | Revenue | Notes |
|---|---|---|---|---|---|---|
| September 6, 2019 | Metallica with the San Francisco Symphony | —N/a | S&M2 / WorldWired Tour | 32,708 / 32,708 | $4,132,350 | Inaugural event for the venue |
| September 8, 2019 | Metallica with the San Francisco Symphony | —N/a | S&M2 / WorldWired Tour | 32,708 / 32,708 | $4,132,350 | Inaugural event for the venue |
| September 10, 2019 | Dave Matthews Band | —N/a | North American Summer Tour 2019 | 9,870 / 9,870 | $1,061,397 | |
| September 11, 2019 | Eric Clapton | Jimmie Vaughan | World Tour (2019) | — | — | Carlos Santana made a surprise appearance during the show. |
| September 12, 2019 | Bon Iver | Sharon van Etten | I, I Tour | 8,674 / 9,500 | $592,963 | |
| September 13, 2019 | Elton John | —N/a | Farewell Yellow Brick Road | 28,380 / 28,380 | $4,374,647 | A second show was added |
| September 15, 2019 | Elton John | —N/a | Farewell Yellow Brick Road | 28,380 / 28,380 | $4,374,647 | A second show was added |
| September 16, 2019 | John Mayer | —N/a | Summer Tour 2019 | 13,189 / 13,189 | $1,700,453 | |
| September 19, 2019 | Mumford and Sons | Gang of Youths | Delta Tour | 10,952 / 11,935 | $806,714 | |
| September 21, 2019 | Janet Jackson | —N/a | Janet Jackson: A Special 30th Anniversary Celebration of Rhythm Nation | 13,255 / 13,255 | $1,592,828 | |
| September 28, 2019 | Eric Church | —N/a | Double Down Tour | 11,935/ 11,935 | $843,426 | |
| October 8, 2019 | Jonas Brothers | Bebe Rexha; Jordan McGraw | Happiness Begins Tour | 13,176 / 13,176 | $1,589,203 | |
| October 9, 2019 | The Who | Liam Gallagher | Moving On! Tour | — | — | |
| October 13, 2019 | Logic | J.I.D; YBN Cordae | Confessions of a Dangerous Mind Tour | — | — | |
| October 17, 2019 | Phil Collins | —N/a | Not Dead Yet Tour | 12,181 / 12,430 | — | |
| October 19, 2019 | Marc Anthony | —N/a | Opus Tour | 8,998 / 9,258 | $1,009,840 | |
| October 26, 2019 | Sara Bareilles | Emily King | Amidst the Chaos Tour | — | — | |
| November 12, 2019 | Santana | War | Supernatural Now Tour | — | — | |
| November 20, 2019 | The Black Keys | Modest Mouse; Shannon and the Clams | Let's Rock Tour | — | — | |
| November 21, 2019 | Cher | Nile Rodgers; Chic | Here We Go Again Tour | 13,115 / 13,115 | $1,739,513 | |
| November 24, 2019 | Bad Bunny | —N/a | X100Pre Tour | 16,387 / 16,387 | $1,499,232 | |
| November 29, 2019 | The Chainsmokers | 5 Seconds of Summer | World War Joy Tour | — | — | |
| December 5, 2019 | Andrea Bocelli; San Francisco Symphony | —N/a | —N/a | 13,225 / 13,225 | $2,667,143 | |
| December 14, 2019 | Illenium | EKALI; Dabin + William Black | The Ascend Tour | — | — | |
| December 17, 2019 | Ariana Grande | Social House | Sweetener World Tour | 22,990 / 22,990 | $3,065,557 | |
| December 18, 2019 | Ariana Grande | Social House | Sweetener World Tour | 22,990 / 22,990 | $3,065,557 | |
| December 30, 2019 | Dead & Company | —N/a | Dead & Company Fall Fun Run 2019 | 30,244 / 30,244 | $4,184,642 | |
| December 31, 2019 | Dead & Company | —N/a | Dead & Company Fall Fun Run 2019 | 30,244 / 30,244 | $4,184,642 | |
| February 13, 2020 | Jo Koy | N/A | Just Kidding World Tour | 18,000 / 18,000 | — | |
| February 15, 2020 | Jo Koy | N/A | Just Kidding World Tour | 18,000 / 18,000 | — | |
| September 15, 2021 | Tame Impala | Sudan Archives | Slow Rush Tour | — | — | - |
| September 29, 2021 | Michael Bublé | —N/a | An Evening with Michael Bublé | — | — | Originally scheduled to take place on May 5, 2020 & February 8, 2021 |
| October 1, 2021 | Luke Combs | Ashley McBryde; Ray Fulcher | What You See Is What You Get 2021 Tour | — | — | |
| October 2, 2021 | Bell Biv DeVoe | —N/a | 30th Anniversary of Poison Celebration | — | — | |
| October 16, 2021 | Phish | —N/a | Summer Tour 2021 | — | — | Originally scheduled to take place on July 25 and 26, 2020 and July 24–25, 2021 |
| October 17, 2021 | Phish | —N/a | Summer Tour 2021 | — | — | Originally scheduled to take place on July 25 and 26, 2020 and July 24–25, 2021 |
| October 20, 2021 | Dan + Shay | The Band Camino; Ingrid Andress | The (Arena) Tour | — | — | Originally scheduled for October 23, 2020 |
| October 22, 2021 | Eagles | —N/a | Hotel California 2020 Tour | — | — | Originally scheduled to take place on April 11 and 12, 2020, then October 2 and 3, 2020 |
| October 23, 2021 | Eagles | —N/a | Hotel California 2020 Tour | — | — | Originally scheduled to take place on April 11 and 12, 2020, then October 2 and 3, 2020 |
| October 29, 2021 | James Taylor | Jackson Browne | —N/a | — | — | Originally scheduled to take place on May 27, 2020, then May 26, 2021 |
| December 17, 2021 | Metallica | DJ Lord; Dean Delray | 2021–2022 Tour | 32,514 / 32,514 | $4,147,430 | |
| December 19, 2021 | Metallica | DJ Lord; Dean Delray | 2021–2022 Tour | 32,514 / 32,514 | $4,147,430 | |
| January 16, 2022 | Tool | Blonde Redhead | Fear Inoculum Tour | — | — | |
| January 30, 2022 | Kane Brown | Chase Rice; Restless Road | Blessed & Free Tour | — | — | |
| February 5, 2022 | Björk | serpentwithfeet | Cornucopia | — | — | |
| February 8, 2022 | Björk | serpentwithfeet | Cornucopia | — | — | |
| March 18, 2022 | John Mayer | Yebba | Sob Rock Tour | — | — | |
| March 19, 2022 | John Mayer | Yebba | Sob Rock Tour | — | — | |
| March 29, 2022 | Billie Eilish | Duckwrth | Happier Than Ever, The World Tour | 12,967 / 13,207 | $1,600,289 | Originally scheduled to take place on April 27, 2020 |
| March 31, 2022 | Journey | Toto | Freedom Tour | — | — | |
| May 5, 2022 | Jo Koy | N/A | Funny is Funny World Tour | 18,000 / 18,000 | — | |
| May 6, 2022 | Jo Koy | N/A | Funny is Funny World Tour | 18,000 / 18,000 | — | |
| August 3, 2022 | The Lumineers | Gregory Alan Isakov; Daniel Rodriguez | Brightside World Tour | 11,177 / 11,177 | $773,779 | Originally scheduled to take place on August 18, 2020 |
| August 23, 2022 | The Killers | Johnny Marr | Imploding the Mirage Tour | — | — | Originally scheduled to take place on August 25, 2020 |
| September 3, 2022 | Alicia Keys | Pink Sweat$ | Alicia + Keys World Tour | — | — | |
| September 4, 2022 | Duran Duran | Nile Rodgers & Chic | Future Past Tour | — | — | |
| September 16, 2022 | Swedish House Mafia | Vintac | Paradise Again World Tour | — | — | |
| September 17, 2022 | Swedish House Mafia | ZHU | Paradise Again World Tour | — | — | |
| September 18, 2022 | Twenty One Pilots | Peter McPoland | The Icy Tour | — | — | |
| September 21, 2022 | Gorillaz | EarthGang | World Tour 2022 | 15,000 | — | |
| September 23, 2022 | Roger Waters | —N/a | This Is Not a Drill | — | — | Originally scheduled to take place on September 25, 2020 |
| September 24, 2022 | Roger Waters | —N/a | This Is Not a Drill | — | — | Originally scheduled to take place on September 25, 2020 |
| September 26, 2022 | Roxy Music | St. Vincent | 50th Anniversary Tour | — | — | |
| October 12, 2022 | Pet Shop Boys; New Order | Paul Oakenfold | Unity Tour | 15,000 | | Postponed twice since 2020 |
| October 19, 2022 | Karol G | | $trip Love Tour | 13,910 / 13,910 | $2,678,110 | |
| October 25, 2022 | Panic! at the Disco | Marina; Jake Wesley Rogers | Viva Las Vengeance Tour | — | — | |
| November 12, 2022 | Lizzo | Latto | The Special Tour | — | — | |
| November 15, 2022 | The Smashing Pumpkins; Jane's Addiction | Poppy | Spirits on Fire Tour | — | — | |
| November 19, 2022 | Carrie Underwood | Jimmie Allen | Denim & Rhinestones Tour | — | — | |
| December 1, 2022 | Andrea Bocelli | Virginia Bocelli | | | | |
| December 6, 2022 | Adam Sandler | | | | | |
| December 11, 2022 | Chris Rock and Dave Chappelle | | | | | |
| March 10, 2023 | Marc Anthony | | Viviendo Tour | | | |
| May 5, 2023 | Ricardo Arjona | | Blanco y Negro Tour | | | |
| June 2, 2023 | Illenium | Said the Sky; Imanu | Illenium Live | | | |
| June 3, 2023 | Illenium | Kream; Annika Wells | Illenium Live | | | |
| July 30, 2023 | Bryan Adams | Joan Jett and the Blackhearts | 2023 So Happy It Hurts Tour | | | |
| August 3, 2023 | Santa Fe Klan | | Todo Y Nada | | | |
| August 7, 2023 | Paramore | The Linda Lindas | This Is Why Tour | | | Originally scheduled to take place on July 22, 2023; Stephen Curry made a surprise appearance during the show. |
| August 18, 2023 | Drake | 21 Savage | It's All a Blur Tour | — | — | — |
| August 19, 2023 | Drake | 21 Savage | It's All a Blur Tour | — | — | — |
| August 28, 2023 | Sam Smith | | Gloria the Tour | | | |
| September 1, 2023 | LL Cool J | | The F.O.R.C.E Live | | | |
| September 8, 2023 | Lionel Richie | Earth, Wind & Fire | Sing A Song All Night Long | | | |
| September 20, 2023 | Eason Chan | — | Fear and Dreams World Tour | — | — | — |
| September 26, 2023 | Arctic Monkeys | | The Car Tour | | | |
| October 6, 2023 | Romeo Santos | | Fórmula, Vol. 3: La Gira | | | |
| October 8, 2023 | RBD | — | Soy Rebelde Tour | — | — | — |
| October 11, 2023 | Peter Gabriel | | i/o - The Tour | | | |
| October 14, 2023 | Pink | Grouplove; KidCutUp | Trustfall Tour | — | — | — |
| October 15, 2023 | Pink | Grouplove; KidCutUp | Trustfall Tour | — | — | — |
| October 26, 2023 | SZA | | SOS Tour | | | |
| October 31, 2023 | Doja Cat | Doechii | The Scarlet Tour | 13,005 | — | — |
| November 7, 2023 | John Mayer | | Solo | | | |
| November 8, 2023 | Queen + Adam Lambert | | The Rhapsody Tour | | | |
| November 9, 2023 | Queen + Adam Lambert | | The Rhapsody Tour | | | |
| November 17, 2023 | Lauryn Hill | Fugees | Miseducation of Lauryn Hill 25th Anniversary | | | |
| December 1, 2023 | Aerosmith | The Black Crowes | Peace Out: The Farewell Tour | — | — | — |
| December 3, 2023 | Depeche Mode | Young Fathers | Memento Mori World Tour | — | — | — |
| December 15, 2023 | Stevie Nicks | | | | | |
| January 31, 2024 | Enrique Iglesias, Pitbull, and Ricky Martin | | The Trilogy Tour | | | |
| February 27, 2024 | Madonna | Stuart Price | The Celebration Tour | — | — | — |
| February 28, 2024 | Madonna | Stuart Price | The Celebration Tour | — | — | — |
| March 1, 2024 | Bad Bunny | | Most Wanted Tour | — | — | — |
| March 2, 2024 | Bad Bunny | | Most Wanted Tour | — | — | — |
| March 28, 2024 | Bruce Springsteen and E Street Band | | Springsteen and E Street Band 2023 World Tour | — | — | Originally scheduled for December 10 and 12, 2023 but postponed due to Springsteen having to recover from health issues. |
| March 31, 2024 | Bruce Springsteen and E Street Band | | Springsteen and E Street Band 2023 World Tour | — | — | Originally scheduled for December 10 and 12, 2023 but postponed due to Springsteen having to recover from health issues. |
| April 11, 2024 | Luis Miguel | | Luis Miguel Tour 2023–24 | — | — | — |
| April 29, 2024 | AJR | | The Maybe Man Tour | — | — | — |
| June 12, 2024 | Janet Jackson | Nelly | Together Again | — | — | — |
| June 23, 2024 | Megan Thee Stallion | GloRilla | Hot Girl Summer Tour | — | — | — |
| July 9, 2024 | Blink-182 | Pierce the Veil | One More Time Tour | — | — | — |
| August 2, 2024 | Olivia Rodrigo | - | Guts World Tour | — | — | Pinkpantheress was originally the opening act for both shows, but she cancelled her set citing "health issues." |
| August 3, 2024 | Olivia Rodrigo | - | Guts World Tour | — | — | Pinkpantheress was originally the opening act for both shows, but she cancelled her set citing "health issues." |
| August 5, 2024 | Jhené Aiko | | The Magic Hour Tour | | | |
| August 18, 2024 | Sebastian Maniscalco | Pat McGann, Pete Correale | It Ain’t Right Tour | | | |
| August 28, 2024 | Suicideboys | Denzel Curry,Pouya,Shakewell,Ekkstacy | Grey Day Tour 2024 | — | — | — |
| August 31, 2024 | Peso Pluma | | Éxodo Tour | | | |
| September 1, 2024 | Jeff Lynne's ELO | Rooney | The Over and Out Tour | | | |
| September 6, 2024 | Carin León | | Boca Chueca Tour 2024 | | | |
| September 12, 2024 | Incubus | Coheed and Cambria | Performing MORNING VIEW In Its Entirety + The Hits | | | |
| September 22, 2024 | Grupo Frontera | | Jugando A Que No Pasa Nada Tour | | | |
| September 23, 2024 | Nicki Minaj | Tyga, Bia, Skillibeng | Pink Friday 2 World Tour | — | — | — |
| September 24, 2024 | Kacey Musgraves | Father John Misty, Nickel Creek | Deeper Well World Tour | | | |
| October 4, 2024 | Kygo | Zara Larson, Vandelux | KYGO World Tour | | | |
| October 9, 2024 | Weezer | The Flaming Lips, Dinosaur Jr. | Voyage to the Blue Planet | | | |
| October 12, 2024 | Jo Koy | | Just Being Koy Tour | | | |
| October 20, 2024 | Charli XCX & Troye Sivan | Shygirl | Sweat | | | |
| November 1, 2024 | Maggie Rogers | Ryan Beatty | The Don't Forget Me Tour Part II | | | |
| November 2, 2024 | Kehlani | Flo, Anycia | Crash World Tour | — | — | — |
| November 9, 2024 | Sabrina Carpenter | Declan McKenna | Short n' Sweet Tour | — | — | — |
| November 23, 2024 | Nick Cannon | Keshia Cole, Soulja Boy, LaRussell | Wild’n Out Live Tour 2024 | | | |
| November 26, 2024 | Cyndi Lauper | | Girls Just Wanna Have Fun Farewell Tour | | | |
| January 24, 2025 | Tom Segura | | Come Together Tour | | | |
| February 19, 2025 | JJ Lin | —N/a | JJ20 Final Lap World Tour | — | — | — |
| February 22, 2025 | Gabriel Iglesias | | Don’t Worry Be Fluffy Tour | | | |
| March 4, 2025 | Deftones | The Mars Volta, Fleshwater | 2025 North American Tour | | | |
| March 5, 2025 | Tyler, The Creator | Lil Yachty, Paris Texas | Chromakopia: The World Tour | | | |
| March 7, 2025 | Mary J. Blige | Ne-Yo, Mario | The For My Fans Tour | | | |
| March 22, 2025 | G.E.M. | | I Am Gloria World Tour | | | |
| April 7, 2025 | Rauw Alejandro | | Cosa Nuestra World Tour | | | |
| April 22, 2025 | Kylie Minogue | Rita Ora | Tension Tour | — | — | — |
| June 24, 2025 | Wu-Tang Clan | | Wu-Tang Forever: The Final Chamber | | | |
| July 18, 2025 | Katy Perry | Rebecca Black | The Lifetimes Tour | — | — | — |
| July 22, 2025 | Lady Gaga | — | The Mayhem Ball | 40,657 | $10,424,203 | Played "Crazy Train" by Ozzy Osbourne as a tribute on night 1 after his passing. |
| July 24, 2025 | Lady Gaga | — | The Mayhem Ball | 40,657 | $10,424,203 | Played "Crazy Train" by Ozzy Osbourne as a tribute on night 1 after his passing. |
| July 26, 2025 | Lady Gaga | — | The Mayhem Ball | 40,657 | $10,424,203 | Played "Crazy Train" by Ozzy Osbourne as a tribute on night 1 after his passing. |
| August 5, 2025 | The Lumineers | | The Automatic World Tour | | | |
| August 10, 2025 | Heart | | Royal Flush World Tour | | | |
| August 12, 2025 | Keshi | | Requiem World Tour | | | |
| August 18, 2025 | Kali Uchis | | The Sincerely, Tour | | | |
| September 24, 2025 | Tate McRae | | Miss Possessive Tour | | | |
| September 25, 2025 | Jonas Brothers | | Jonas20: Greetings from Your Hometown Tour | | | |
| September 30, 2025 | Laufey | | A Matter of Time | | | |
| December 19, 2025 | Kelly Chen | | Season 2 Live 2025 Tour | | | |
| October 19, 2026 | Doja Cat | Latto | Tour Ma Vie World Tour | | | |

== See also ==
- Sports in the San Francisco Bay Area
- Oakland Athletics relocation to Las Vegas
- Oakland Raiders relocation to Las Vegas
- List of indoor arenas by capacity

Events and tenants
| Preceded by Oracle Arena | Home of the Golden State Warriors; 2019–present | Succeeded by |
| Preceded by Laugardalshöll | League of Legends World Championship; Final Venue; 2022 | Succeeded by Gocheok Sky Dome |
