= Groovin' (Paul Carrack album) =

Studio album by Paul Carrack
- Released: 2001
- Genres: Pop rock; R&B; soul
- Length: 40:44
- Label: Carrack-UK
- Producer: Paul Carrack

Paul Carrack chronology
Satisfy My Soul (2000)	Groovin' (2001)	It Ain't Over (2003)

Reissue cover
- Artwork for 2002 release Still Groovin'

Groovin' is the eighth solo studio album by the English singer-songwriter Paul Carrack, then a member of the supergroup Mike + The Mechanics. It was originally released in 2001 on Carrack's own Carrack-UK label.

This was Carrack's first all-covers album as a solo artist; he had previously helped create a hard rock covers album as the front man of the ad hoc 1993 quasi-supergroup Spin 1ne 2wo. Groovin' has a different feel from that project, as this album features a selection of Carrack's favourite Motown, R&B and pop songs of the 1960s and early 1970s. Carrack produced the album himself, and played virtually all of the instruments.

There are several different issues of the album, including a 13-track version, a 14-track version, and an 18-track version known as Still Groovin' . This last version of the album was issued in 2002, and also features a DVD of live performances and videos.

== Track listing ==
No.	Title	Writer(s)	Length
1.	"Harvest for the World"	The Isley Brothers, Chris Jasper	3:12
2.	"Sunny"	Bobby Hebb	3:19
3.	"Too Busy Thinking About My Baby"	Norman Whitfield, Barrett Strong, Janie Bradford	3:17
4.	"Crazy Love"	Van Morrison	2:44
5.	"Baby I Need Your Loving"	Brian Holland, Lamont Dozier, Edward Holland, Jr.	2:51
6.	"Walk On By"	Burt Bacharach, Hal David	2:49
7.	"What Does It Take"	Harvey Fuqua, Johnny Bristol, Vernon Bullock	2:52
8.	"Any Day Now"	Bacharach, Bob Hilliard	3:40
9.	"Cover Me"	Eddie Hinton, Marlin Greene	2:56
10.	"With You in Mind"	Allen Toussaint	3:31
11.	"Ain't No Sunshine"	Bill Withers	2:29
12.	"Groovin'"	Felix Cavaliere, Eddie Brigati	2:44
13.	"You've Got a Friend"	Carole King	3:21

=== Additional tracks ===
Bonus track on some CD issues
No.	Title	Writer(s)	Length
14.	"Into the Mystic"	Morrison	3:35

Bonus tracks on Still Groovin' (2002 re-release)
No.	Title	Writer(s)	Length
14.	"Into the Mystic"	Morrison	3:35
15.	"People Get Ready"	Curtis Mayfield	2:35
16.	"Warm and Tender Love"	Bobby Robinson, Ida Berger	3:17
17.	"It's Growing"	Smokey Robinson, Warren Moore	2:49
18.	"I Wish It Would Rain"	Whitfield, Strong, Rodger Penzabene	2:51

== Personnel ==
Credits are adapted from the album's liner notes.

- Paul Carrack – vocals, keyboards, guitars, bass, drums, producer
- Steve Beighton – saxophones
- Peter Van Hooke – executive producer
- Nigel Bates – mixing, mastering
- Bill Smith Studio – art direction, design
- Paul Cox – photography
- Reggie Pedro – illustration

DVD credits from Still Groovin' (Tracks 1–4)

- Paul Carrack – vocals, keyboards, guitars
- Paul Copley – keyboards, vocals
- John Robinson – guitars
- Jeremy Meek – bass
- Dean Duke – drums
- Steve Beighton – saxophones
- Lindsay Dracass – backing vocals
- Peter Van Hooke – producer
- Christopher Janschke – director, editing
- Minkjam – post-production
- Phil Gaines – director of photography
- Anna Hawkins – titles, graphics
- E-xentric Thinking – art direction, design
- Alan Wood – tour manager
