= Good Feeling (Paul Carrack album) =

Studio album by Paul Carrack
- Released: June 2012
- Genres: Pop rock; soft rock
- Length: 45:36
- Label: Carrack-UK
- Producer: Paul Carrack

Paul Carrack chronology
A Different Hat (2010)	Good Feeling (2012)	Rain or Shine (2013)

Good Feeling is the fourteenth solo studio album by the English singer-songwriter Paul Carrack. It was originally released in 2012 on Carrack's own Carrack-UK label and peaked at number 46 on the UK Albums Chart, making Good Feeling Carrack's highest charting solo album to that time.

Carrack originally recorded the song "From Now On" on his 1982 LP Suburban Voodoo; the version on Good Feeling is an entirely new recording.

== Reception ==
Professional ratings
Review scores
Source	Rating
AllMusic	3.5/5 stars

AllMusic's Stephen Thomas Erlewine calls Good Feeling "a bright, bouncing collection of blue-eyed soul. Perhaps the production is just a shade too clean -- it not only has a bright gloss but not a note is out of place, everybody is in the pocket -- but there's also a genuine warmth to Carrack's music, derived not just from his honeyed voice but from the precision of his seasoned backing band."

== Track listing ==
No.	Title	Writer(s)	Length
1.	"Good Feelin' About It"	Paul Carrack	3:14
2.	"Marmalade Moon"	Carrack, Chris Difford	3:23
3.	"Nothing Without You"	Carrack	4:36
4.	"I Can Hear Ray"	Carrack, Charlie Dore, Iain James, Michael Logen	3:57
5.	"Long Ago"	Carrack, Chris Antbaldt	4:06
6.	"Make It Right"	Alex Tinlin, Rolf Tinlin	4:02
7.	"If I Should Fall Behind"	Bruce Springsteen	4:35
8.	"From Now On"	Nick Lowe	4:14
9.	"I Don't Wanna Lose Your Love"	Carrack	4:10
10.	"Time To Move On"	Carrack	4:10
11.	"When My Little Girl Is Smiling"	Gerry Goffin, Carole King	2:32
12.	"A Child Is Born"	Thad Jones	2:40

== Personnel ==
Musicians

- Paul Carrack – all vocals, all instruments except where noted
- Alex Tinlin – guitars (6), backing vocals (6)
- Rolf Tinlin – mandolin (6), backing vocals (6)
- Jack Carrack – drums
- Steve Beighton – saxophones

Production

- Paul Carrack – producer
- Rupert Cobb – mixing, additional editing
- Ian Ross – design
- Andrea Hunnicutt – photography
- Alan Wood – tour management
