= One Good Reason (album) =

Studio album by Paul Carrack
- Released: 26 October 1987
- Recorded: late 1986 – March 1987
- Studios: Comforts Place (Lingfield, Surrey, UK); The Farm (Surrey, UK)
- Genres: Blue-eyed soul; pop
- Length: 39:13
- Label: Chrysalis
- Producer: Christopher Neil

Paul Carrack chronology
Suburban Voodoo (1982)	One Good Reason (1987)	Groove Approved (1989)

One Good Reason is the third solo studio album by the English singer-songwriter Paul Carrack, then a member of the rock supergroup Mike + The Mechanics. It was released in October 1987 by Chrysalis Records, five years after his previous studio album, Suburban Voodoo (1982). In the interim between solo albums, Carrack had been a member of Nick Lowe and his Cowboy Outfit, which released two studio albums in 1984 and 1985, and joined Mike + The Mechanics for their 1985 self-titled debut.

Mike + The Mechanics drummer Peter Van Hooke and songwriter and record producer Christopher Neil also appear on the album, serving in the same roles they did for the Mechanics. The album includes two of Carrack's highest charting solo hits in the US, "Don't Shed a Tear" (which became a Top 10 hit, peaking at No. 9) and "One Good Reason" (which peaked at No. 28).

In addition to "Don't Shed a Tear", three additional singles charted from the album, including a cover of the Jackie DeShannon classic, "When You Walk in the Room". The album's title track, another one of these singles, also cracked the Top 30 on the US chart.

== Critical reception ==
Professional ratings
Review scores
Source	Rating
AllMusic	2/5 stars
New Musical Express	2/10

Jim Green of Trouser Press was not entirely enthusiastic about the album, writing: "Half of One Good Reason is decent-to-good, and the rest is mediocre-to-poor....it's got more radio-music slickness than Carrack's had in years but at the cost of some identity." Green notes that "It did yield a genuine not-bad pop hit ("Don't Shed a Tear")."

AllMusic's Mike DeGagne retrospectively calls "Don't Shed a Tear" "the album's highlight, bolstered by its subtle, laid-back groove with a stop and start tempo which comes across as unique to a certain extent." But he castigated the rest of the record, saying that "while the songs are well-written lyrically, they're dispensed rather half-heartedly from a musical standpoint" and "It's apparent in tracks like 'Fire With Fire' and 'Give Me a Chance' that Paul Carrack has reached the point of pop pedestrianism."

== Track listing ==
Side one
No.	Title	Writer(s)	Length
1.	"One Good Reason"	Paul Carrack; Chris Difford	3:19
2.	"When You Walk in the Room"	Jackie DeShannon	3:31
3.	"Button Off My Shirt"	Billy Livsey; Graham Lyle	3:46
4.	"Give Me a Chance"	Carrack	4:51
5.	"Double It Up"	Carrack; Nick Lowe	3:44

Side two
No.	Title	Writer(s)	Length
6.	"Don't Shed a Tear"	Eddie Schwartz; Rob Friedman	4:55
7.	"Fire with Fire"	Carrack; Christopher Neil	3:59
8.	"Here I Am"	Mike Duke; Huey Lewis; Andre Pessis	4:00
9.	"Collrane"	Carrack; Neil	4:40
10.	"(Do I Figure) In Your Life"	Pete Dello	2:16
Total length:			39:13

== Personnel ==
Credits are adapted from the album's liner notes.

Musicians

- Paul Carrack – lead vocals
- Paul "Wix" Wickens –keyboards
- Tim Renwick – guitars
- Peter Van Hooke – drums
- Frank Ricotti – percussion
- John "Irish" Earle – saxophone (7)
- Jackie Rawe – backing vocals
- Linda Taylor – backing vocals, lead vocals (2)

Production and artwork

- Christopher Neil – producer
- Simon Hurrell – engineer
- Pete Woodroffe – engineer
- Peter Corriston – art direction
- Mark Cozza – design
- Brian Griffin – photography
