= Nightbird (Paul Carrack album) =

Studio album by Paul Carrack
- Released: July 1980
- Recorded: January–February 1980
- Studios: RG Jones Recording Studios and Basing Street Studios (London, UK)
- Genres: Pop rock, soft rock
- Length: 41:49
- Label: Vertigo
- Producers: Phill Brown; Paul Carrack; Alan Callan

Paul Carrack chronology
Nightbird (1980)	Suburban Voodoo (1982)

Professional ratings
Review scores
Source	Rating
AllMusic	3/5 stars

Nightbird is the debut solo studio album by the English singer-songwriter Paul Carrack. It came out in 1980, shortly after Carrack's tenure with Roxy Music, and featured musical contributions from several Roxy session musicians, as well as backing vocals (and a songwriting contribution) from Carrack's former Ace bandmate Alan "Bam" King. Nightbird was originally released on Vertigo Records in the UK and Europe, and was reissued in 2004 on PolyGram.

The album's pre-release single was "Beauty's Only Skin Deep". On that single, it was indicated the album was to be called Showing Off.

Shortly after this album was issued, Carrack joined the band Squeeze. He stayed a member of Squeeze for most of 1981 before resuming his solo career.

== Track listing ==
No.	Title	Writer(s)	Length
1.	"Beauty's Only Skin Deep"	Norman Whitfield, Eddie Holland	2:54
2.	"There's a Good Chance"	Paul Carrack	4:14
3.	"In Love With Me"	Alan "Bam" King, K. White	4:20
4.	"Foregone Conclusion"	Carrack	4:20
5.	"Love Is All It Takes"	Andy Fraser	4:21
6.	"Bet You Never Been in Love"	Carrack	3:56
7.	"Where You Going Babe"	Carrack	4:14
8.	"You Belong With Me"	Carrack	4:45
9.	"The Rumour"	Carrack	4:12
10.	"Nightbird"	Carrack	4:27

== Personnel ==
Credits are adapted from the album's liner notes.

- Paul Carrack – lead vocals, backing vocals, keyboards, guitars
- Winston Delandro – guitars
- Neil Hubbard – guitars
- Tim Renwick – guitars
- Alan Spenner – bass
- Kuma Harada – bass
- Richard Bailey – drums
- Andy Newmark – drums
- Jeff Seopardie – drums
- Neville Murray – percussion
- Mel Collins – saxophones
- Malcolm Griffiths – trombone
- Guy Barker – trumpet
- Martin Drover – trumpet
- Dyan Birch – backing vocals
- Alan "Bam" King – backing vocals
- Noel McCalla – backing vocals

=== Production ===
- Paul Carrack – producer
- Phill Brown – producer, engineer
- Alan Callan – producer (1, 6, 7)
- Barry Sage – assistant engineer
- Iain McKell – front cover photography (black and white)
- Brendan Walsh – front cover photography (color), management
- Mike Prior – back cover portrait
