= These Days (Paul Carrack album) =

Studio album by Paul Carrack
- Released: 7 September 2018
- Studios: Air Lyndhurst (London, UK)
- Genres: Pop rock; soft rock; blue-eyed soul
- Length: 43:55
- Label: Carrack-UK
- Producers: Paul Carrack; Peter Van Hooke

Paul Carrack chronology
Soul Shadows (2016)	These Days (2018)	One on One (2021)

These Days is the seventeenth solo studio album by the English singer-songwriter Paul Carrack. The follow-up to Soul Shadows, it was released on 7 September 2018, on Carrack's own Carrack-UK label.

== Track listing ==
No.	Title	Writer(s)	Length
1.	"Amazing"	Paul Carrack	4:01
2.	"Life in a Bubble"	Carrack	4:37
3.	"In the Cold Light of Day"	Carrack, Chris Difford	2:54
4.	"Dig Deep"	Carrack, Difford	4:15
5.	"These Days"	Carrack, Difford	3:47
6.	"You Make Me Feel Good"	Carrack	3:42
7.	"Tell Somebody Who Cares"	Carrack	4:18
8.	"Where Does the Time Go?"	Carrack, Difford	4:00
9.	"Talk to Me"	Carrack	4:26
10.	"Perfect Storm"	Carrack	4:03
11.	"The Best I Could"	Carrack, Difford	3:54

== Personnel ==
Musicians

- Paul Carrack – vocals, keyboards, acoustic guitars, electric guitars
- Robbie McIntosh – acoustic guitars, electric guitars, slide guitar, dobro
- Jeremy Meek – bass
- Steve Gadd – drums
- Frank Ricotti – percussion
- Peter Van Hooke – percussion
- Steve Beighton – baritone saxophone
- Pee Wee Ellis – tenor saxophone, horn arrangements
- Dennis Hobson – trombone
- Gary Winters – trumpet

=== Production ===
- Paul Carrack – producer, cover concept
- Peter Van Hooke – producer, cover concept, additional photography
- Geoff Foster – basic track recording
- Adam Miller – recording assistant
- Graham Bonnett – additional engineer
- Martin Levan – mixing at Red Kite Studio (Wales, UK)
- Ray Staff – mastering at Air Mastering (London, UK)
- Ian Ross – cover concept, cover design
- Ben Carrack – vintage photography
- Lena Semmelroggen – studio photography

== Charts ==
Chart performance for These Days
Chart (2018)	Peak position
Scottish Albums (Official Charts)	14
UK Albums (Official Charts)	33
