= Soul Shadows =

Studio album by Paul Carrack
- Released: 15 January 2016
- Genres: Pop rock; soft rock; blue-eyed soul
- Length: 43:11
- Label: Carrack-UK
- Producers: Paul Carrack; Peter Van Hooke

Paul Carrack chronology
Rain or Shine (2013)	Soul Shadows (2016)	These Days (2018)

Soul Shadows is the sixteenth solo studio album by the English singer-songwriter Paul Carrack. It was originally released in 2016 on Carrack's own Carrack-UK label.

Carrack's former Squeeze bandmate Chris Difford co-wrote one track. The album was co-produced by Carrack and long-time associate Peter Van Hooke, who is Carrack's former Mike + The Mechanics bandmate.

Soul Shadows reached #25 on the UK album charts during a six-week chart stay in 2016. This makes it the highest-charting album of Carrack's solo career, including compilations.

== Reception ==
Professional ratings
Review scores
Source	Rating
AllMusic	3/5 stars
Blurt	3/5 stars

Lee Zimmerman of Blurt claimed Soul Shadows "reflects the UK rocker’s love for authentic American soul music ... (Carrack) sings with the kind of conviction that would make Al Green, Otis Redding and Wilson Pickett nod their heads with approval."

In a mixed-to-positive review, AllMusic's Stephen Thomas Erlewine says of Soul Shadows that "the real human touch comes from Carrack's voice, which is as warm and easy as ever while also benefiting from the gentle assurance of an old master ... if the songs don't necessarily hook, this certainly is a mellow good time."

== Track listing ==
No.	Title	Writer(s)	Length
1.	"Keep on Lovin' You"	Paul Carrack	4:02
2.	"Sleep on It"	Carrack	4:00
3.	"Sweet Soul Legacy"	Carrack	4:06
4.	"Let Me Love Again"	Carrack	3:43
5.	"Bet Your Life"	Carrack, Chris Difford	4:40
6.	"Too Good to Be True"	Carrack	4:05
7.	"Watching Over Me"	Carrack	3:32
8.	"That's How I Feel"	Carrack	3:54
9.	"Late at Night"	Carrack	4:04
10.	"Say What You Mean"	Carrack	4:19
11.	"Share Your Love with Me"	Alfred Braggs, Deadric Malone	2:53

== Personnel ==
Musicians

- Paul Carrack – vocals, acoustic piano (1, 2, 4, 5, 7, 11), clavinet (1, 5, 8, 9), Hammond organ (1–3, 5, 6, 8–11), guitars (1–10), bass (1–4, 6–11), vibraphone (1–3, 7, 11), electric piano (3, 8), melodica (3), drums (3), Wurlitzer electric piano (6, 9), harmonica (6, 7), washboard (7, 10), maracas (10), acoustic guitars (11), baritone guitar (11)
- Jack Carrack – drums (1, 2, 4–10), handclaps (3)
- Peter Van Hooke – percussion (1–9), handclaps (3), drums (11)
- Pee Wee Ellis – saxophones (1, 3, 9, 10), horn arrangements (3)
- Alistair White – trombone (1, 3, 9)
- Paul Spong – trumpet (1, 3, 9)

Orchestra (Tracks 1, 4, 5, 8, 9 & 11)

- Richard Niles – orchestrations (1, 9, 11)
- David Cullen – orchestrations (4, 5, 8)
- Everton Nelson – orchestra leader
- Isobel Griffiths – orchestra contractor
- Susie Gillis – orchestra contracting assistant

Brass and woodwinds (4, 5, 8, 11)

- Anna Noakes – alto flute
- Karen Jones – flute
- Andy Wood – bass trombone
- Richard Edwards – tenor trombone
- Mark Nightengale – tenor trombone
- John Barclay – flugelhorn

Strings

- Ian Burdge – first cello
- Chris Worsey – cello
- Vicky Matthews – cello (1, 9, 11)
- Hugh Webb – harp (4, 5, 8, 11)
- Bill Hawkes – first viola
- Nick Barr – viola
- Steve Wright – viola
- Everton Nelson – lead first violin
- Alison Dods – first violin
- Oliver Langford – first violin
- Matthew Ward – first violin
- Nicky Sweeney – first violin (1, 9, 11)
- Richard George – second lead violin
- Simon Baggs – second violin
- Chris Tombling – second violin
- Julian Tear – second violin (1, 9, 11)
- Rose Warren-Green – second violin (1, 9, 11)

Production

- Paul Carrack – producer, recording
- Peter Van Hooke – producer
- Graham Bonnett – recording, mixing
- Geoff Foster – string recording (1, 4, 5, 8, 9, 11) at Air Lyndhurst (London, UK)
- Paul Cox – photography
- Ruth Rowland – hand lettering
- Ian Ross – design
- Paul Carrack, Jack Carrack, Peter Van Hooke, Angela Hunnicutt and Dave Robinson – montage photos
