= Groove Approved =

Studio album by Paul Carrack

Studio album by Paul Carrack
- Released: 16 October 1989
- Recorded: May – July 1989
- Studios: The Hit Factory (New York City, New York, USA); Farmyard Studios (Little Chalfont, England); Advision Studios and Mayfair Studios (London, UK)
- Genres: Pop rock; soft rock
- Length: 52:52
- Label: Chrysalis
- Producers: Paul Carrack; Eddie Schwartz; T-Bone Wolk

Paul Carrack chronology
One Good Reason (1987)	Groove Approved (1989)	Blue Views (1996)

Groove Approved is the fourth solo studio album by the English singer-songwriter Paul Carrack, then a member of the supergroup Mike + The Mechanics. It was originally released in 1989, on the Chrysalis label.

While his previous album featured members of Mike + The Mechanics, for this album Carrack worked mainly with producer T-Bone Wolk. The album's only hit was "I Live by the Groove", which was co-written by Carrack and Eddie Schwartz, and which peaked at #31 on the Billboard Hot 100. Schwartz co-produced the track with Wolk and Carrack; the rest of the album was produced by Wolk and Carrack working as a duo.

The song "Battlefield" was later covered by co-writer Nick Lowe under the title "I Live On A Battlefield". Carrack himself would use this longer title when he re-recorded the song in 2007 on his album Old, New, Borrowed And Blue, and again on his 2010 album A Different Hat (backed by The Royal Philharmonic Orchestra). Diana Ross also covered the track for her 1991 album The Force Behind the Power. The song "I Live By the Groove" was featured in a montage scene in the 1989 cult film The Wizard, as well as in a scene in the 1994 film Camp Nowhere.

== Reception ==
Professional ratings
Review scores
Source	Rating
AllMusic	3/5 stars

AllMusic's William Ruhlmann calls Groove Approved "a solid, workman-like collection", and writes that its limited commercial success "had less to do with the album's real commercial potential than with upheavals in the record company".

Jim Green of Trouser Press praised the album for its "good old-fashioned R&B grooves, often garnished with Carrack's tasty Hammond organ licks." However, Green also notes that "unfortunately, the synthetic drums sometimes slicken or stiffen the rhythm too much," and that "the songs aren't unforgettable, but they're mostly painless".

== Track listing ==
No.	Title	Writer(s)	Length
1.	"Only My Heart Can Tell"	Paul Carrack, T-Bone Wolk	5:21
2.	"I Live by the Groove"	Carrack, Eddie Schwartz	4:09
3.	"Battlefield"	Carrack, Nick Lowe	4:20
4.	"Love Can Break Your Heart"	Carrack, Michael McDonald	5:20
5.	"I'm on Your Tail"	Carrack, Lowe	6:15
6.	"After the Love Is Gone"	Carrack, Chris Difford	6:23
7.	"Loveless"	Carrack, Wolk	4:22
8.	"Tip of My Tongue"	Carrack, Wolk	6:06
9.	"Dedicated"	Carrack	5:22
10.	"Bad News (At the Best of Times)"	Carrack, John Welsey Harding	5:14

== Personnel ==
Credits are adapted from the album's liner notes.

- Paul Carrack – lead vocals, backing vocals (1, 7, 8), Hammond organ (1, 2, 5, 6), horns (1–3, 5, 6), additional drum fills (1, 6), acoustic piano (2, 10), Wurlitzer electric piano (2, 3), keyboards (3, 5–9), bass (3), additional drums (3, 8), vibraphone (3), keyboard programming (4, 5), strings (7), hi-hat (7)
- Ed Royensdal – keyboard programming (1–3, 6, 7, 9)
- Tom "T-Bone" Wolk – electric guitars (1, 2, 5–8), bass guitar (1, 2, 4–10), Roland TR-606 (2), Fender 6-string bass guitar (3), keyboards (4), mando-guitar (5), backing vocals (5, 10), acoustic guitars (8, 10), harmonium (9), rhythm guitars (9), tambourine (9), accordion (10), mandolin (10)
- Mike Campbell – additional 6-string guitars (1), additional 12-string guitars (1)
- Robbie McIntosh – electric guitars (4), guitar solo (4, 9), lead guitar (9)
- Vinnie Zummo – rhythm guitars (6)
- Jimmy Bralower – drum programming (1–8, 10), tambourine (10)
- Mickey Curry – drums (9), cymbals (9)
- Sammy Figueroa – percussion (1, 6)
- Tom Lord-Alge – additional percussion (1)
- Dick Morrissey – saxophone (5)
- Bob Loveday – violin (10)
- Joe Lynn Turner – backing vocals (1–3)
- Daryl Hall – backing vocals (2, 4, 5)
- Curtis King – backing vocals (2)
- Bernard Fowler – backing vocals (6, 7)
- Paul Young – backing vocals (8)

Handclaps on "Battlefield"

- Paul Carrack, Mell Papaterpos, Anthony Aquilato and Tom "T-Bone" Wolk

== Production ==
- Paul Carrack – producer
- T-Bone Wolk – producer
- Eddie Schwartz – producer (2)
- Tim Leitner – recording
- Thom Cadley – recording assistant
- Derek McCartney – recording assistant
- Bob Clearmountain – mixing (1, 3, 7–9)
- Tom Lord-Alge – mixing (2, 4–6, 10)
- Lee Curle – mix assistant
- Joe Pirrera – mix assistant
- Kevin Whyte – mix assistant
- Paul Logus – AMS Audio File
- Bob Ludwig – mastering at Masterdisk (New York, NY, USA)
- Anthony Aquilato – production coordinator
- Michael Krage – album design
- John Millar – photography
