= Rain or Shine (Paul Carrack album) =

Studio album by Paul Carrack
- Released: 3 December 2013
- Genres: Pop rock; soft rock; blue-eyed soul
- Length: 35:26
- Label: Carrack-UK
- Producers: Paul Carrack, Peter Van Hooke

Paul Carrack chronology
Good Feeling (2012)	Rain or Shine (2013)	Soul Shadows (2016)

Rain or Shine is the fifteenth solo studio album by the English singer-songwriter Paul Carrack. It was originally released in 2013 on Carrack's own Carrack-UK label, and was co-produced by Carrack and long-time associate Peter Van Hooke, who is Carrack's former Mike + The Mechanics bandmate.

== Reception ==
Professional ratings
Review scores
Source	Rating
AllMusic	3/5 stars

AllMusic's Stephen Thomas Erlewine writes that "Rain or Shine captures Paul Carrack living comfortably inside his signature sound: a blue-eyed soul that turns happier with each passing year."

== Track listing ==
No.	Title	Writer(s)	Length
1.	"Stepping Stone"	Paul Carrack	4:04
2.	"That's All That Matters To Me"	Carrack	3:37
3.	"One In A Million"	Carrack	3:38
4.	"You Don't Know Me"	Cindy Walker, Eddy Arnold	3:14
5.	"(If Loving You Is Wrong) I Don't Want To Be Right"	Homer Banks, Carl Hampton, Raymond Jackson	3:59
6.	"Time Waits For No One"	Carrack	4:02
7.	"Hard Times (No One Knows Better Than I)"	Ray Charles, Mitch Mitchell	3:07
8.	"I'm Losing You"	Pierre Havet, Jean Gaston Renard, Carl Sigman	2:54
9.	"Life's Too Short"	Carrack	3:19
10.	"Come Rain Or Come Shine"	Harold Arlen, Johnny Mercer	3:31

== Personnel ==
Credits are adapted from the album's liner notes.

- Paul Carrack – vocals, acoustic piano, Hammond organ, guitars, bass, drums, vibraphone
- Jim Watson – acoustic piano (7, 10)
- Jeremy Meek – bass (5, 6)
- Steve Pearce – double bass (7, 8, 10)
- Jack Carrack – drums (1, 2, 5, 6, 9)
- Ian Thomas – drums (7, 8, 10)
- Doug Webb – alto saxophone
- Tom Luer – baritone saxophone
- Tom Evans – tenor saxophone
- Steve Stassi – trumpet
- Lee Thornburg – trumpet
- Stringzilla Orchestra – strings (1–6, 8–10)
- Richard Niles – horn and string arrangements

Production

- Paul Carrack – producer
- Peter Van Hooke – producer
- Rupert Cobb – engineer, mixing
- Ashburn Miller – engineer (horns and strings)
- Zavosh Rad – engineer (horns and strings)
- Andrea Hunnisett – photography
- Martin Huch – inlay photography
- Ian Ross – design
