= Don't Shed a Tear =

Single by Paul Carrack

from the album One Good Reason
- B-side: "Merilee"
- Released: 1987
- Studio: Comforts Place (Lingfield, Surrey)
- Genre: Blue-eyed soul; pop rock
- Length: 4:57 (full-length album version); 3:42 (single version)
- Label: Chrysalis
- Songwriters: Rob Friedman; Eddie Schwartz
- Producer: Christopher Neil

Paul Carrack singles chronology
"When You Walk in the Room" (1987)	"Don't Shed a Tear" (1987)	"One Good Reason" (1988)

Music video
- "Don't Shed a Tear" on YouTube

"Don't Shed a Tear" is a song by the English singer and musician Paul Carrack from his third solo studio album, One Good Reason (1987). It was released as a single in 1987 and became his biggest US hit, peaking at number nine on the Billboard Hot 100.

== Background ==
The tune was written by Canadian singer-songwriter and guitarist Eddie Schwartz, along with fellow songwriter Rob Friedman. Schwartz, who was fresh off writing "Hit Me with Your Best Shot" for Pat Benatar, later decided to record the song with a new band he had formed with Lenny Zakatek and Dave Tyson. However, the entire project was ultimately scrapped after failed negotiations with potential manager Tommy Mottola. Some years later, the song reached the hands of Paul Carrack's producer, and Carrack ultimately recorded the song.

== Release and critical reception ==
"Don't Shed a Tear" entered the Billboard Hot 100 at number 72 on the chart dated 14 November 1987. It was the highest new entry that week. It peaked at number nine for three weeks in February 1988, becoming Carrack's biggest US hit as a solo artist. It spent 23 weeks on the Hot 100, including 13 weeks inside the top 40 section of the chart, and appeared in Billboard's 1988 year-end chart at number 83. It also reached number five on the Album Rock Tracks chart, and number six on the Singles Sales chart.

Elsewhere, the song peaked at number 20 in the Netherlands, but was not successful in the UK, reaching number 60 in March 1989. Mike DeGagne of AllMusic called "Don't Shed a Tear" a highlight of the One Good Reason album, and said the song is "bolstered by its subtle, laid-back groove with a start-and-stop tempo."

== Music video ==
A music video was made for the song. The video, directed by Peter Care and starring model and actress Kendall Conrad, features a woman (Conrad) at the beach looking for someone. As she drives, Paul Carrack sings as video of him is projected against a variety of backgrounds.

== Track listing ==
7" Vinyl (US, UK)

1. "Don't Shed a Tear" – 3:42
2. "Merrilee" – 3:52

7" Vinyl (Japan)

1. "Don't Shed a Tear" – 3:42
2. "When You Walk in the Room" – 3:31

12" Vinyl (UK, Germany, the Netherlands)

1. "Don't Shed a Tear" – 4:14
2. "Merrilee" – 3:52
3. "All Your Love Is in Vain" – 3:34

== Chart performance ==
Chart (1987–1989)	Peak position
Canada Top Singles (RPM)	34
Dutch Top 40	20
UK Singles Chart	60
US Billboard Hot 100	9
US Billboard Album Rock Tracks	5
US Billboard Adult Contemporary	36
US Cash Box Top 40	9

=== Year-end charts ===
Chart (1988)	Position
United States (Billboard)	83
