= Suburban Voodoo =

Studio album by Paul Carrack
- Released: August 1982
- Studios: Rockfield Studios (Monmouth, Wales, UK); Eel Pie Studios (London, UK)
- Genres: Pop rock; R&B
- Length: 38:19
- Label: Epic
- Producer: Nick Lowe

Paul Carrack chronology
Nightbird (1980)	Suburban Voodoo (1982)	One Good Reason (1987)

Suburban Voodoo is the second solo studio album by English singer-songwriter Paul Carrack. In between his previous solo album (1980's Nightbird) and this release, Carrack had been a member of Squeeze, singing lead on their 1981 hit "Tempted".

The band on this album, dubbed Noise To Go, was the result of arrangement between Nick Lowe and Carrack to provide backing on each other's albums. The same group of musicians, but with Lowe as lead vocalist, is heard on Lowe's albums Nick the Knife (1982) and The Abominable Showman (1983).

The album reached #78 on the Billboard 200, and includes Carrack's first chart hit as a solo artist, "I Need You", which peaked at #37 in the US in October 1982.

Thirty years after the release of this LP, Carrack re-recorded the Suburban Voodoo album track "From Now On" (in a very different arrangement) for his 2012 album Good Feeling.

== Reception ==
Professional ratings
Review scores
Source	Rating
AllMusic	3/5 stars

AllMusic's William Ruhlmann notes retrospectively that Suburban Voodoo "sounds very much like a (Nick) Lowe album with Carrack singing. That's all to the good, though, since Carrack's supple voice is well-suited to Lowe's updated '60s rock & roll style." Ruhlmann goes on to call Suburban Voodoo "an unusually tuneful album."

Jim Green of Trouser Press also noted the Nick Lowe connection, writing that "Suburban Voodoo sounds like the souled-up flipside of Nick the Knife — if anything, it's better. Yet it succeeds because of Lowe's production and composing presence, which complements Carrack's excellent voice with the kind of pop smarts that bring out his best."

== Track listing ==
No.	Title	Writer(s)	Length
1.	"Lesson in Love"	Paul Carrack	2:58
2.	"Always Better with You"	Carrack	3:30
3.	"I Need You"	Carrack, Nick Lowe, Martin Belmont	2:47
4.	"I'm in Love"	Carlene Carter, Lowe	3:16
5.	"Don't Give My Heart a Break"	Carter, Lowe, Carrack	3:21
6.	"A Little Unkind"	Carrack	3:03
7.	"Out of Touch"	Chris Difford, Glenn Tilbrook	3:06
8.	"What a Way to Go"	Carrack, Lowe, Belmont, James Eller, Ceiling	2:50
9.	"So Right, So Wrong"	Carrack, Lowe, Belmont, Eller, Ceiling	3:29
10.	"From Now On"	Lowe	3:20
11.	"Call Me Tonight"	Carrack, Alan Spenner	3:05
12.	"I Found Love"	Neil Hubbard	3:37

== Personnel ==
Credits are adapted from the album's liner notes.

- Paul Carrack – vocals, pianos, organ
- Martin Belmont – guitars
- James Eller – bass
- Bobby Irwin – drums, backing vocals
- Nick Lowe – backing vocals

== Production ==
- Nick Lowe – producer
- Paul Cobbold – engineer
- Chris Ludwinski – mixdown assistant
- Brian Griffin – photography
