= It Ain't Over (Paul Carrack album) =

Studio album by Paul Carrack
- Released: 2003
- Genre: Pop rock; R&B
- Length: 45:36
- Label: Carrack-UK
- Producer: Paul Carrack

Paul Carrack chronology
Groovin' (2001)	It Ain't Over (2003)	Winter Wonderland (2005)

It Ain't Over is the ninth solo studio album by the English singer-songwriter Paul Carrack, then a member of the supergroup Mike + The Mechanics. It was originally released in 2003 on Carrack's own Carrack-UK label.

Several different versions of the album exist. In addition to the standard 11-track issue, a "Special Edition" featuring four additional live recordings was released. As well, the European issue of It Ain't Over contains the standard 11 studio tracks plus two additional live tracks that did not appear on the "Special Edition", for a total of 13 tracks.

== Reception ==
Professional ratings
Review scores
Source	Rating
AllMusic	4.5/5 stars

AllMusic's Thom Jurek calls the album "smart, sophisticated, sassy, classy pop music", and writes that "It Ain't Over is a case in point for Carrack's consistency and brilliance."

== Track listing ==
No.	Title	Writer(s)	Length
1.	"She Lived Down the Street"	Paul Carrack, Chris Difford	3:01
2.	"Nothin' to Lose"	Carrack	4:07
3.	"It Ain't Over"	Carrack	4:22
4.	"Happy to See You Again"	Carrack	4:30
5.	"Where Did I Go Wrong?"	Carrack	3:24
6.	"Empty Space"	Carrack, Difford	4:22
7.	"One Small Step"	Carrack, B.A. Robertson	3:46
8.	"Forever"	Carrack	3:19
9.	"Never Too Late"	Carrack	4:44
10.	"Just a Little Lie"	Carrack, Charlie Dore	4:20
11.	"Ain't No Love"	Carrack	5:31

=== Additional tracks ===
"Special Edition" bonus live tracks
No.	Title	Writer(s)	Length
12.	"Georgia"	Hoagy Carmichael, Stuart Gorrell	4:00
13.	"Love Will Keep Us Alive"	Peter Vale, Jim Capaldi, Carrack	4:36
14.	"Any Day Now"	Burt Bacharach, Bob Hilliard	3:35
15.	"The Living Years"	Mike Rutherford, B.A. Robertson	5:51

European release bonus live tracks
No.	Title	Writer(s)	Length
12.	"Sunny"	Bobby Hebb
13.	"Another Cup of Coffee"	Mike Rutherford, Christopher Neil

== Personnel ==
=== Musicians ===
- Paul Carrack – vocals, all other instruments
- Steve Beighton – saxophones
- Ed Collins – trumpet, flugelhorn
- Wired Strings – strings
- Rosie Wetter – string arrangements
- Rod Argent – grand piano on "Georgia"
- The London Community Gospel Choir – choir on "The Living Years"

=== Production ===
- Paul Carrack – producer
- Nigel Bates – final mixes
- Bill Smith – art direction
- Ian Ross for E-xentric Thinking – design
- Michele Turriani – photography
