= Satisfy My Soul (album) =

Studio album by Paul Carrack
- Released: 2000
- Genres: Pop rock; soft rock
- Length: 46:53
- Label: Carrack-UK
- Producer: Paul Carrack

Paul Carrack chronology
Beautiful World (1997)	Satisfy My Soul (2000)	Groovin' (2001)

Satisfy My Soul is the seventh solo studio album by the English singer-songwriter Paul Carrack, then a member of the supergroup Mike + The Mechanics. It was originally released in 2000 on Carrack's own Carrack-UK label.

Mike Rutherford of Mike + The Mechanics contributes to the album as a songwriter, as does Carrack's former Squeeze bandmate Chris Difford. Carrack produced the album himself, and played the majority of the instruments. The record peaked at #63 on the UK album charts.

== Reception ==
Professional ratings
Review scores
Source	Rating
AllMusic	3/5 stars

AllMusic's William Cooper calls Satisfy My Soul "another collection of melodic pop songs" from "an engaging, solid performer." Cooper notes that "though some of the material is weak, (Carrack's) distinctive vocal gifts make even the most mediocre song worth hearing."

== Track listing ==
No.	Title	Writer(s)	Length
1.	"Satisfy My Soul"	Paul Carrack, Chris Difford	3:29
2.	"Together"	Carrack	4:08
3.	"Where Would I Be"	Carrack	4:31
4.	"My Kind"	Carrack	4:26
5.	"Inspire Me"	Carrack	3:55
6.	"The Only One"	Carrack, Difford	5:01
7.	"How Wonderful"	Carrack, Difford	3:46
8.	"Running Out of Time"	Carrack, Mike Rutherford	4:24
9.	"Better Than Nothing"	Carrack	4:04
10.	"Time Passes"	Carrack	4:34
11.	"Make Your Mind Up"	Carrack	4:19

== Personnel ==
Credits are adapted from the album's liner notes.

- Paul Carrack – vocals, keyboards, guitars, bass, drums
- Ian Thomas – drums (1, 8, 10, 11)
- Lee Russell – drum loops (3)
- Andy Newmark – drums (5, 9)
- Steve Beighton – saxophones
- David Crichton – strings
- Lindsay Dracass – backing vocals (2)

=== Production ===
- Peter Van Hooke – executive producer
- Paul Carrack – producer, engineer
- Graham Bonnett – additional engineer
- Nigel Bates – mixing, mastering, technical support
- Benedict Fenner – mastering
- Bill Smith Studio – art direction, design
- Michele Turriani – photography
- Paul Copley – management
