= Blue Views =

Studio album by Paul Carrack
- Released: 1995
- Studios: Abbey Road Studios (London, UK)
- Genres: Pop rock; soft rock
- Length: 48:20
- Labels: I.R.S. (UK); Ark 21 (US)
- Producer: Peter Van Hooke

Paul Carrack chronology
Groove Approved (1989)	Blue Views (1995)	Beautiful World (1997)

Blue Views is the fifth solo studio album by the English singer-songwriter Paul Carrack, then a member of the supergroup Mike + The Mechanics. It was Carrack's first solo album in seven years; in the interim period between solo albums, he had recorded one album as a member of Squeeze, one album as a member of Spin 1ne 2wo, and two albums as a member of Mike + The Mechanics. Blue Views was originally released in 1995 on I.R.S. Records in the UK and most other territories. In the US, it appeared on the Ark 21 label.

The album was produced by Carrack's erstwhile Mike + The Mechanics bandmate Peter Van Hooke, who had left the group the previous year. Blue Views spun off two UK top 40 hits: "Eyes of Blue" and a re-recording of "How Long", which Carrack had originally written and sung 22 years earlier as a member of the band Ace.

In the US, "Eyes of Blue" was a minor hit on the Adult Contemporary (AC) chart, while the track "For Once in Our Lives" was a major AC hit, peaking at No. 3.

The song "Love Will Keep Us Alive", co-written by Carrack, was previously recorded by the Eagles for their 1994 album Hell Freezes Over.

== Reception ==
Professional ratings
Review scores
Source	Rating
AllMusic	3/5 stars

AllMusic's Stephen Thomas Erlewine calls Blue Views "solid adult contemporary pop", and while criticizing some of the "spotty" material, writes that "Carrack's vocals are terrific and the sound is appealingly polished."

== Track listing ==
No.	Title	Writer(s)	Length
1.	"Eyes of Blue"	Paul Carrack	3:59
2.	"For Once in Our Lives"	Carrack, Chris Difford	5:53
3.	"No Easy Way Out"	Carrack, Rafe Van Hoy	5:14
4.	"Oh Oh Oh My My My"	Carrack	4:12
5.	"Only a Breath Away"	Carrack, Brenda Russell, Mark Cawley	4:21
6.	"Nothing More Than a Memory"	Carrack	4:59
7.	"Somewhere in Your Heart"	Carrack, Van Hoy	3:41
8.	"Love Will Keep Us Alive"	Carrack, Jim Capaldi, Peter Vale	4:35
9.	"Always Have Always Will"	Carrack, Russell, Cawley	4:41
10.	"Don't Walk Over Me"	Carrack, Difford	4:40
11.	"How Long"	Carrack	3:51
12.	"Over My Shoulder" (Released on 1997 reissue and 2014 remastered edition)	Carrack, Mike Rutherford	3:14
13.	"People Get Ready" (Released on 1997 reissue and 2014 remastered edition)	Curtis Mayfield	2:35

== Personnel ==
Credits are adapted from the album's liner notes.

- Paul Carrack – vocals, keyboards
- Rod Argent – keyboards
- Tim Renwick – guitars (1–6, 8–11)
- Robbie McIntosh – guitars (1–6, 8–13)
- Mitch Dalton – classical guitar (1)
- Neil Hubbard – guitars (7)
- Pino Palladino – bass (1–7, 9–11)
- Keith Wilkinson – bass (8)
- Andy Newmark – drums
- Martin Ditcham – percussion
- Luís Jardim – percussion
- Frank Ricotti – percussion
- Roger Chase – viola (10)
- Bill Hawkins – viola (10)
- Perry Montague-Mason – violin (10)
- Gavyn Wright – violin (10)
- Katie Kissoon – backing vocals
- Tessa Niles – backing vocals
- Lance Ellington – backing vocals (5, 9, 10)

=== Production ===
- Peter Van Hooke – producer
- Simon Smart – recording, mixing
- Paul Mortimer – additional engineer
- Danny Dawson – recording assistant, mix assistant
- Paul Hicks – recording assistant, mix assistant
- Robbie Kazandjian – recording assistant, mix assistant
- Guy Massey – recording assistant, mix assistant
- Chris Blair – mastering
- Abrahams Pants – design
- Paul Cox – photography

== Certifications ==
Region	Certification	Certified units/sales
Spain (Promusicae)	Gold	50,000^{^}
United Kingdom (BPI)	Silver	60,000^{*}
^{*} Sales figures based on certification alone.^{^} Shipments figures based on certification alone.
