= Alan King (guitarist) =

English guitarist and songwriter (born 1945)

- Also known as: Bam
- Born: Alan Charles King; 18 September 1945 (age 80); Muswell Hill, London, England
- Genres: Rock
- Occupation: Musician
- Instrument: Guitar
- Formerly of: The Boys; The Action; Mighty Baby; Warm Dust; Ace; Juice on the Loose

Alan Charles King (born 18 September 1945) is an English guitarist and singer, best known for his time with the British 1960s pop group The Action and the 1970s rock band Ace.

== Career ==
=== The Boys, The Action and Mighty Baby ===
Alan King was one of the founding members of the British pop group The Action, for whom he played rhythm guitar and sang backing vocals. King started the group with original members Reg King, Mike Evans and Roger Powell in August 1963 as The Boys, who had a brief spell as a bar band in Germany, and then as a backing band for Sandra Barry, including on her single "Really Gonna Shake" in 1964.

After the stint with Barry, The band later added Pete Watson as lead guitarist, renamed themselves The Action, and got a record deal at Parlophone with producer George Martin. In the late 60s, they moved from largely covering Tamla Motown hits in a British beat group style to original songs with a psychedelic/folk rock influence, with Alan King making contributions to the songwriting.

A number of line up changes, including the departures of Watson and singer Reg King, and their being dropped by Parlaphone led to band altering their style further and The Action went on to become the psychedelic/progressive rock band Mighty Baby, with Alan King taking over as lead singer, with addition of guitarist Martin Stone and multi-instrumentalist and songwriter Ian Whiteman. After the dissolution of Mighty Baby in 1971, King briefly joined former Action lead singer Reg King in B B Blunder, an offshoot of psychedelic band Blossom Toes.

=== Ace and chart success ===
In 1972 King and lead guitarist Phil Harris, formed pub rock band Ace. They recruited singer, keyboardist and songwriter Paul Carrack. Ace had an international hit single with the Carrack penned song "How Long", reaching number 3 in the US charts and the top 20 in the UK Singles Chart. Following the success of "How Long", King moved with Ace to Los Angeles, but the group failed to follow up the success of that single. Following the departure of Carrack for a solo career, Ace disbanded in 1977.

=== Later career ===
After Ace, King (along with Ace drummer Fran Byrne) joined R'n'B act Juice on the Loose, who performed in London throughout the 1980s as a live act and backing band for visiting performers. Juice on the Loose also released two albums, a cassette EP, and three singles featuring King as a vocalist and guitar player.

King subsequently moved to New Zealand, and aside from occasionally appearing in reunions of The Action in the late 1990s, he largely left the music industry. However, in the 2010s he re-emerged in New Zealand with a new band using the "Juice On The Loose" name.
