= The Action =

English rock band (principally 1963–1969)

- Also known as: Azoth (1968)
- Origin: Kentish Town, North London, England
- Genres: Blue-eyed soul, folk rock, psychedelic rock, freakbeat
- Years active: 1963–1969 (Reunion: 2000)
- Labels: Parlophone (UK), Capitol (US), Hansa (France)
- Spinoffs: Mighty Baby
- Spinoff of: Sandra Barry and the Boyfriends
- Past members: Alan "Bam" King; Mike "Ace" Evans; Roger Powell; Reg King; Peter Watson; Ian Whiteman; Martin Stone
- Website: actionmightybaby.co.uk

The Action were an English rock band of the 1960s, formed as the Boys (not the later punk rock band of the same name) in August 1963, in Kentish Town, North West London. They are also known as Azoth. Part of the mod subculture, they played soul music-influenced pop music.

== History ==
=== 1963–1964: The Boys ===
The band was formed as the Boys in August 1963, in Kentish Town, North West London. The original members were Reg King (lead vocals), Alan "Bam" King (rhythm guitar, vocals), Mike "Ace" Evans (bass guitar) and Roger Powell (drums). Members Reg King and Powell had known each other since their schooldays, and were involved in the early days of the Scene Club in Soho, London, becoming pioneers in mod subculture and fashion. Alan King became the third band member, and brought Evans into the band. The Boys were then approached by Mike Court from Juke Box Jury, who referred them to band management, and asked them to venture forth into song-writing.

The Boys originated as a backing band for Sandra Barry, (sometimes referred to as Sandra Barry and the Boyfriends), and played on her single "Really Gonna Shake", written by Reg King and released in March 1964 on Decca. After the stint with Barry, Pete Watson was recruited as lead guitarist, and the Boys had a brief period as a bar band in Brunswick, Germany. On returning to the United Kingdom, the band played a gig at The Birdcage Club in Portsmouth, Hampshire, and were recruited by manager Rikki Farr. In November 1964, the Boys released their first single "It Ain't Fair" b/w "I Want You" on Pye. By early 1965, the band had changed their name to The Action.

=== 1965–1968: The Action ===
The Action first auditioned for Decca on 31 May 1965, with an assortment of demos such as "In My Lonely Room", "You'll Want Me Back", "Girl (Why You Wanna Make Me Blue)", and "Fine Looking Girl". However, the band were unsuccessful in securing a recording contract.

In 1965, they signed to Parlophone with producer George Martin, head of Associated Independent Recording (AIR). Released in October 1965, "Land of a Thousand Dances" b/w "In My Lonely Room" was well received by critics, but sold poorly. The Action were renowned for their own arrangements of American Tamla Motown songs and releasing them as singles. In the band's lifetime, none of The Action's singles achieved success in the UK Singles Chart.

The Action began as a supporting act for The Who at the Marquee Club, in late 1965. The Who's manager Kit Lambert felt the Action were too good to be a support act and that they sabotaged the Who's constructed image. As a result, The Action were dropped as the support act. However, in no time at all, from December 1965, the Action had taken on a residency at the Marquee and regularly performed there throughout 1966, developing a mod following. Phil Collins was a regular attendee.

In 1966, the band released two more singles "I'll Keep Holding On" and "Baby, You've Got It". "I'll Keep Holding On" was not only the most highly regarded Action 45, but was also considered by music writer Richie Unterberger to be one of the few Motown covers markedly superior to the original. The single was released in February 1966, and entered the Melody Maker single charts. It reached No.42 (on 5 March 1966), and even as high as No.39, but soon faltered. On 3 June 1966 the band made an appearance on the Dick Clark show Where the Action Is, performing their single "I'll Keep Holding On", while being filmed outside the Royal Albert Hall, in South Kensington, London.

On 31 July 1966 the Action performed at the 6th National Jazz & Blues Festival, a three-day event held at the Royal Windsor Racecourse. They headlined with Georgie Fame and early Cream.

In mid-1966, there were plans for a 1966 Action LP, but it was eventually dismissed. In August 1966, the band recorded an obscure composition by American writing team, Gerry Goffin and Carole King, "Wasn't It You" – a highlight in their studio career. It would have stood a chance of becoming a hit, but for unknown reasons, the song was shelved. Eventually, it was released in 1969 with "Harlem Shuffle" b/w "Wasn't It You" as a German B-side on Hansa, in the years following post-Action. Powell: "I loved 'Wasn't It You'. It was a shame it never came out at the time, as I thought that it was the best song we did for a hit." Reg King had regarded it as one of his top three Action songs.

The Action made regular television appearances, despite not having any associated chart hit singles. They were on Ready Steady Go! (RSG), at least twice, most notably for their singles "I'll Keep Holding On" and "Land of a Thousand Dances". There was even a short documentary episode made on the band for the American television show The Twentieth Century, where the Action performed at Durham University in October 1966. Relying solely on a few singles for material, the Action were known to perform The Ronettes songs "Do I Love You?" and "You Baby" in their live sets; as George Martin was preoccupied with the Beatles' Sgt. Pepper's Lonely Hearts Club Band recording sessions. The Action were noted for their three-part harmonies. Led by Reg King's soulful vocals, Alan King and Pete Watson were very good harmony singers. However, dissatisfied with the stewardship of their manager Rikki Farr, Pete Watson left the band in late 1966.

In 1967, the Action continued as a quartet. They released their last two singles "Never Ever", an original composition, and "Shadows and Reflections" with the B-side, "Something Has Hit Me", co-written by Reg King with Melody Maker journalist and flatmate Nick Jones. The band was dropped by Parlophone in mid-1967, after their last single "Shadows and Reflections" failed to chart, by which time they had also parted ways with their manager Rikki Farr. George Martin's company AIR had financed all of the Action's recordings up to this point in their career, and the band had yet to experience any hits.

This is a new venture sound-wise for us [Shadows and Reflections]. In the past we have concentrated more on the bass sound, but this time we are playing flower music. Flower music is soft, happy, gentle, full-of-life sunshine sounds. This new sound is what we've been trying for a long time. I hope everyone would buy it and learn what it's all about.

— Reg King, Rave magazine (July 1967)

For the second half of 1967, the Action assumed control of their own affairs. Keyboardist Ian Whiteman briefly joined, in an effort to expand their sound and to help secure the band with a new recording contract by November 1967. However, Whiteman had since left the band, and was driven out by Reg King's increasingly unpredictable behaviour. Guitarist Martin Stone was soon recruited to fill his place.

The Action were now set about gathering original material for a new projected LP. The beginning of Rolled Gold was initially recorded with George Martin in mind as head producer, but no one at Parlophone was interested in the demo recordings at the time. Their demo recordings were in a radically different, Byrds-influenced psychedelic style, and it failed to secure the band with a long hoped-for record deal. During this time, the band temporarily worked with Georgio Gomelsky and engineer Carlos Olmes of Marmalade Records. (These 1967/68 demos were eventually released in the 1990s, under the title Rolled Gold). The Action's profound and experimental masterpiece, "Brain" was recorded in these sessions, with its phasing, chord-driven guitars, rolling drums, dreamy bass, and Reg's voice shouting and pleading the listeners to "remember me". Yet such ventures risked confusing and alienating the band's hardcore mod following. With the Action seemingly having reached an impasse, the demos were shelved for 30 years, and vocalist Reg King departed from the band in mid-1968. King was hired by Gomelsky to produce Gary Farr, and eventually pursued a solo career.

Following Reg King's exit, Ian Whiteman returned and shared vocal duties with Alan King. It was at this point, that the band decided on a brief name change from the Action to Azoth. However, the band soon reverted to their old name, in order to record a new set of five demos. The demos captured the band's transition into more of a mid-tempo, West Coast-influenced, psychedelic ballad style and early folk rock. (These demos were eventually released in 1985, under the title The Action Speaks Louder Than Words).

=== 1969–1971: Mighty Baby ===
By January 1969, upon signing to Head Records (a fledgling independent label run by their former roadie John Curd), the Action were finally and permanently re-christened Mighty Baby – under the name in which they released two albums: Mighty Baby (1969) and A Jug Of Love (1971). In 1971, the band featured and played on former band member Reg King's solo album. Mighty Baby were practicing Muslims and disbanded at the end of the year, in 1971.

In the years immediately following the band's breakup at the end of 1971, Martin Stone was a founding member of Chilli Willi and the Red Hot Peppers, Alan King was a founding member of Ace and had a US hit with "How Long" in 1975. Roger Powell, Mike Evans and Ian Whiteman formed the Habibiyya.

In Mighty Baby we were analysing life, who we were. In The Action we weren't, we were just being the life.

— Roger Powell, Mark Raison (2012)

== Legacy and reunion ==
In 1980, The Ultimate Action, a compilation album of the Action's Parlophone tracks was released, with sleeve notes written by Paul Weller ("The Action had it in their soul"). It did much for the creditability of the band and their profile. Weller: "I reckon Reggie King stands as one of the best of the white soul singers. In some ways his rich, smooth voice sounds a lot more natural than [Steve] Marriott's." The Action's Reg King was the singer for whom the term "blue-eyed soul" could have been invented—and he made the term a capability rather than a limitation. The term blue-eyed soul was originally coined for The Righteous Brothers by black DJs, and it became a general term for all white singers who sang what was then considered "black music". According to King himself, the Action never played any songs by white artists.

The Rolled Gold album of demos were hailed by critics as lost classics, when they were reissued in the 1990s (formally released in 2002). In 1998, the original line-up of the Action reformed for a concert in the Isle of Wight. They headlined and played two shows at the Ryde Theatre for the New Untouchables August Bank Holiday Mod Rally. They also played at the Tufnell Park Dome and Boston Arms in London, 1998 (Uptight and Outasight).

They are one of the favourite bands of Phil Collins, who performed with the reunited band at the 100 Club in June 2000. "For me it was like playing with the Beatles", he later commented on the experience in 2002. Collins financed the documentary film In The Lap Of The Mods (2000), which contained footage from both reunion gigs, 100 Club and Tufnell Park Dome, as well as some archive material. In 2012, a biographical book titled The Action: In The Lap Of The Mods by Ian Hebditch and Jane Shepard, was released and forwarded by Sir George Martin.

Since their reunion in 1998, the Action played semi-regularly over the next six years. They made their final appearance at Modstock 2004, a three-day event organized by the New Untouchables to commemorate 40 years of Mod Subculture, on May 30, 2004.

During an interview in September 1986, Steve Marriott regarded the Action as a "legitimate band" and compared them to the likes of the Small Faces, in terms of street origins and authenticity in the 1960s Mod scene. Marriott: "We all tried our hand at getting that [Motown] sound you know ... all the bands in the mid '60s. The best ones at it were the Action ... They were an amazing band."

== Band members ==
Classic line-up:

- Reg King – lead vocals (1963–1968, 1998–2004; died 2010)
- Alan "Bam" King – rhythm guitar, vocals (1963–1971, 1998–2004)
- Pete Watson – lead guitar, vocals (1964–1966, 1998–2004)
- Mike "Ace" Evans – bass guitar (1963–1971, 1998–2004; died 2010)
- Roger Powell – drums (1963–1971, 1998–2004)

Additional members:

- Ian Whiteman – keyboards, vocals, saxophone, flute (1967, 1968–1971)
- Martin Stone – lead guitar (1967–1971; died 2016)

== Discography ==
=== Singles ===
as Sandra Barry and The Boys

- "Really Gonna Shake" / "When We Get Married" (R. King) (March 1964, Decca)

as The Boys

- "It Ain't Fair" (R. King/Evans) / "I Want You" (R. King/Evans) (November 1964, Pye)

as The Action

- "Land of One Thousand Dances" b/w "In My Lonely Room" (Holland-Dozier-Holland) (October 1965, Parlophone)
- "I'll Keep Holding On" / "Hey Sah-Lo-Ney" (February 1966, Parlophone)
- "Baby, You've Got It" (McAllister, Vail) / "Since I Lost My Baby" (Robinson/Moore) (July 1966, Parlophone)
- "Never Ever" (King/King/Evans/Powell) / "TwentyFourth Hour" (King/King/Evans/Powell) (February 1967, Parlophone)
- "Shadows and Reflections" (Larry Marks/Tandyn Almer) / "Something Has Hit Me" (King/Jones) (June 1967, Parlophone)
- "Harlem Shuffle" / "Wasn't It You" (Goffin/King) (1969, Hansa, Germany only)
- French EP: "Shadows and Reflections" / "Something Has Hit Me" / "Never Ever" / "Twenty Fourth Hour" (Odeon (MOE 149), 1967)

=== Compilation albums ===
==== The Ultimate Action ====
(singles and other material recorded by the original run of the band, 1964–1967)

No.	Title	Writer(s)	Length
1.	"I'll Keep Holding On"	Mickey Stevenson; Ivy Jo Hunter	3:43
2.	"Harlem Shuffle"	Bob Relf; Earl Nelson	3:16
3.	"Never Ever"	King / King / Evans / Powell	2:39
4.	"TwentyFourth Hour"	King / King / Evans / Powell	2:42
5.	"Since I Lost My Baby"	Smokey Robinson; Warren "Pete" Moore	3:35
6.	"In My Lonely Room"	Holland–Dozier–Holland	2:38
7.	"Hey Sha-Lo-Ney"	Mickey Lee Lane; John Linde; Bernie Lane	2:25
8.	"Wasn't It You?"	Gerry Goffin; Carole King	2:51
9.	"Come On, Come With Me"		2:23
10.	"Just Once in My Life"	Phil Spector; Greg Goffin; Carole King	2:56
11.	"Shadows and Reflections"	Larry Marks; Tandyn Almer	2:52
12.	"Something Has Hit Me"	Reg King; Nick Jones	3:28
13.	"The Place"		2:33
14.	"The Cissy"	Alan King	2:22
15.	"Baby You've Got It"	Maurice McAlister; Terry Vail	2:42
16.	"I Love You (Yeah!)"	Curtis Mayfield	3:19
17.	"Land of One Thousand Dances"	Chris Kenner	2:51

In addition to this in 1980 compilation album, Edsel gradually released four singles using the same material:

- "I'll Keep on Holding On/Wasn't It You?" – E5001 1981
- "Since I Lost My Baby/Never Ever/Wasn't It You?" – E5002 1981
- "Shadows and Reflections/Something Has Hit Me" – E5003 1982
- "Hey Sha-Lo-Ney/Come On, Come With Me" – E5008 1984

==== Brain/Rolled Gold ====
(Tracks recorded in late 1967 and 1968, but released only in 1995):

No.	Title	Writer(s)	Length
1.	"Come Around"	Reg King	2:47
2.	"Something To Say"		3:15
3.	"Love Is All"		3:42
4.	"Icarus"		2:54
5.	"Strange Roads"		3:55
6.	"Things You Cannot See"		2:46
7.	"Brain"		3:00
8.	"Look At The View"		3:59
9.	"Climbing Up The Wall"	Reg King	3:03
10.	"Really Doesn't Matter"		3:07
11.	"I'm A Stranger"		2:44
12.	"Little Boy"	Reg King	4:17
13.	"Follow Me"		2:56
14.	"In My Dream"		3:19
15.	"In My Dream" (Demo)		4:51

==== Action Speaks Louder Than (EP) ====
(Tracks recorded circa. 1968, released by Castle Music in 1985):

All tracks are written by Ian Whiteman.

No.	Title	Length
1.	"Only Dreaming"
2.	"Dustbin Full Of Rubbish"
3.	"An Understanding Love"
4.	"My Favourite Day"
5.	"A Saying For Today"

==== Uptight and Outasight ====
(Radio and TV recordings, 2004 CD bonus: 1998 live recording, released by Circle Records):

CD1 – The Action on Television and BBC Radio 1966–1967

No.	Title	Length
1.	"I'll Keep Holding On"
2.	"Land of One Thousand Dances / Uptight"
3.	"Mine Exclusively" (BBC Radio's Saturday Club 1966)
4.	"Reg King Interview" (BBC Radio's Saturday Club 1966)
5.	"Baby You've Got It" (BBC Radio's Saturday Club 1966)
6.	"Take Me In Your Arms (Rock Me A While)" (BBC Radio's Saturday Club 1966)
7.	"Going to a Go-Go" (BBC Radio's Pop North 1966)
8.	"Never Ever" (BBC Radio's Pop North 1966)
9.	"Love Is All" (BBC Radio's Saturday Club 1967)
10.	"I See You" (BBC Radio's Saturday Club 1967)
11.	"India" (BBC Radio's Saturday Club 1967)
12.	"Shadow and Reflections" (BBC Radio's Saturday Club 1967)

CD2 – The Boston Arms, London 1998

No.	Title	Writer(s)	Length
1.	"Meeting Over Yonder"
2.	"The Monkey Time"	Curtis Mayfield
3.	"Baby Don't You Do It"
4.	"In My Lonely Room"
5.	"I Love You (Yeah!)"
6.	"Girl (Why You Wanna Make Me Blue)"
7.	"Ooo Baby Baby"	Smokey Robinson; Warren "Pete" Moore
8.	"Crazy About You Baby"
9.	"Heatwave"	Holland–Dozier–Holland
10.	"People Get Ready"
11.	"The Memphis Train"
12.	"Since I Lost My Baby"
13.	"Harlem Shuffle"
14.	"Baby You've Got It"
15.	"I'll Keep On Holding On"
16.	"Land of One Thousand Dances"

==== Shadows And Reflections: The Complete Recordings 1964–1968 ====
(Studio, Radio and TV recordings, remastered. Released by Grapefruit Records and Cherry Red Records in 2018):

CD1 – The Parlophone Masters

No.	Title	Length
1.	"Land of One Thousand Dances"
2.	"In My Lonely Room"
3.	"I'll Keep Holding On"
4.	"Hey Sah-Lo-Ney"
5.	"Baby, You've Got It"
6.	"Since I've Lost My Baby"
7.	"Never Ever"
8.	"TwentyFourth Hour"
9.	"Shadows and Reflections"
10.	"Something Has Hit Me"
11.	"The Harlem Shuffle"
12.	"Wasn't It You"
13.	"The Place"
14.	"The Cissy"
15.	"I Love You (Yeah!)"
16.	"Come On, Come With Me"
17.	"Just Once In My Life" (New Mono Mix)
18.	"Mine Exclusively" (BBC Session)
19.	"Reg King Interview / Baby You've Got It" (BBC Session)
20.	"Take Me in Your Arms (Rock Me a Little While)" (BBC Session)
21.	"I See You" (BBC Session)
22.	"Shadow and Reflections" (BBC Session)

CD2 – At Abbey Road

No.	Title	Length
1.	"I'll Keep Holding On"
2.	"The Cissy"
3.	"Never Ever"
4.	"Since I Lost My Baby"
5.	"Shadows and Reflections"
6.	"Hey Sah-Lo-Ney"
7.	"Something Has Hit Me"
8.	"Baby, You've Got It"
9.	"I Love You (Yeah!)"
10.	"It Wasn't You"
11.	"The Harlem Shuffle"
12.	"The Place"
13.	"TwentyFourth Hour"
14.	"Come On, Come With Me"
15.	"Just Once In My Life"
16.	"Something Has Hit Me" (Rehearsal)
17.	"I Love You (Yeah!)" (Backing Track Take 4)
18.	"Never Ever" (Rehearsal)
19.	"Come On, Come With Me" (Backing Track Take 4)
20.	"TwentyFourth Hour" (Alternative Version)
21.	"The Place" (Backing Track Take 2)
22.	"Just Once in My Life" (Take 2)
23.	"Something Has Hit Me" (Alternative Backing Track)
24.	"Shadows and Reflections" (Backing Track)

CD3 – Rolled Gold Plus: The 1967–68 Recordings

No.	Title	Length
1.	"Come Around"
2.	"Something To Say"
3.	"Love Is All"
4.	"Icarus"
5.	"Strange Roads"
6.	"Things You Cannot See"
7.	"Brain" (Full Length Version)
8.	"Look At The View"
9.	"Climbing Up The Wall (See Me)" (Full Length Version)
10.	"It Really Doesn't Matter" (Full Length Version)
11.	"I'm A Stranger"
12.	"Little Boy" (Full Length Version)
13.	"Follow Me"
14.	"In My Dream" (George Martin Orchestrated Version)
15.	"Only Dreaming" (Action Speaks Louder Than)
16.	"Dustbin Full of Rubbish" (Action Speaks Louder Than)
17.	"An Understanding Love" (Action Speaks Louder Than)
18.	"My Favourite Day" (Action Speaks Louder Than)
19.	"A Saying For Today" (Action Speaks Louder Than)
20.	"In My Dream" (Demo Version)

CD4 – Action Extras

No.	Title	Length
1.	"It Ain't Fair" (The Boys)
2.	"I Want You" (The Boys)
3.	"Fine Looking Girl" (The Boys)
4.	"Girl (Why You Wanna Make Me Blue)" (Decca Audition)
5.	"In My Lonely Room" (Decca Audition)
6.	"You'll Want Me Back" (Decca Audition)
7.	"I'll Keep On Holding On" (Ready Steady Go! Live)
8.	"Land of One Thousand Dances / Uptight (Everything's Alright)" (Ready Steady Go! Live)
9.	"Going to a Go-Go" (BBC Session)
10.	"Never Ever" (BBC Session)
11.	"India" (BBC Session)
12.	"Love Is All" (BBC Session)
13.	"I'll Keep Holding On" ("Edsel" mix)
14.	"Baby, You've Got It" ("Edsel" mix)
15.	"The Harlem Shuffle" ("Edsel" mix)
16.	"Just Once in My Life" ("Edsel" mix)
17.	"Never Ever" ("Edsel" mix)
18.	"TwentyFourth Hour" ("Edsel" mix)
19.	"Something Has Hit Me" ("Edsel" mix)
20.	"Shadows and Reflections" ("Edsel" mix)
