= Warm Dust =

British progressive jazz rock band (1969–1972)

- Origin: England
- Genres: Progressive rock, jazz
- Years active: 1969–1972
- Labels: Trend, Uni, BASF, Metronome, Stateside
- Spinoffs: Ace
- Past members: Paul Carrack; Terry "Tex" Comer; Alan Solomon; John Surguy; Dave Pepper; Les Dransfield Walker

Warm Dust was a progressive jazz rock band of the early 1970s. Although a relatively obscure group, it featured Paul Carrack and Terry "Tex" Comer, who later formed Ace. The band recorded for the Trend and BASF labels. It also had releases on the Uni, Stateside and Metronome labels.

== Background ==
According to the 9 October 1971 issue of Record Mirror and The Self Portrait Gospel, Warm Dust came about when two groups The Milwaukee Coasters and Jasmine Tea (Jasmin T.) appeared at Hamburg's Top Ten club in 1969. The meeting of the musicians was the beginning of Warm Dust. Even though the band was ignored by the UK media, it did get some good coverage in the English music trade magazines.

With at least one member coming from Sheffield in England, they played music in the jazz rock and psych genre. The members included, Les Walker, Paul Carrack, John Surguy, Alan Solomon, Terry "Tex" Comer, Dave Pepper, Keith Bailey and John Bedson. The original version of the group had four members. The line-up then was Les Dransfield Walker (lead vocals, harp, guitar), Paul Carrack (organ, piano, guitar), Dave Pepper (drums) and Terry Corner (bass guitar, recorder). The group then added two other members, John Surgey (tenor sax) and Alan Solomon (sax) who they met when it had its one-month residency at Hamburg's Top Ten club.

It was in 1970 that the band released its debut album And It Came to Pass on the Trend label.

According to Alan Kilburn in the 28 November 1970 issue of Melody Maker, the group was grossly underrated in England but big on the continent. It was speculated that the first album sold better in France. The group itself had drawn comparisons with how it was received overseas, and at home with the British media not being helpful with the new wave of British artists that had emerged in recent times.

Years later, Paul Carrack was quoted as saying, "We were quite an interesting little band of hippies playing this mad music".

== Career ==
=== 1969 ===
Warm Dust were booked to appear at the first Internationales Essener Pop & Blues Festival on Thursday, 9 October 1969. Fleetwood Mac was the headline act and other supporting acts besides Warm Dust were Pretty Things, Spooky Tooth, Yes, Keef Hartley, Free, and Hard Meat.

=== 1970 ===
Warm Dust had their launch at the Paradiso club in Amsterdam. Negram Records man Evert Wilbrink and Class International director Rod Harrod organized the reception. Warm Dust had also signed a contract to perform in Holland with the Paul Acket Agency. There was also a good sales prediction for the group's 2LP, It Came to Pass.

An article in the 6 June 1970 issue of Disc and Music Echo came with a picture of the band. At the time the lineup was Les Walker, David Pepper, Alan Solomon, Terry Comer, John Surguy, and Paul Carrack. This was the line-up they had for the past six months. Their album And It Came to Pass had recently hit the shelves. The group was feeling the fatigue after a busy four months with most of their appearances on the continent. Paul Carrack had commented on the English clubs being a drag, as well as not having much faith in the audiences.

It was reported in the 20 June 1970 issue of Disc and Music Echo that Warm Dust's drummer Dave Pepper had been replaced by Keith Bailey who had previously been with Graham Bond. An alto and soprano saxophonist called Christian was added to the line up as well.

According to the 25 July 1970 issue of Melody Maker (released on a Thursday), Warm Dust had just completed a five-day tour of Germany which had ended the day before. They were planning to release their second album, and their first single had a planned release for September. With their appearances in the UK being considered rare, they were to appear at the St. Annes Tennis Club on the following Wednesday (29th). This event and a return to Germany on 1 August was to interrupt two days of recording. While in Germany they were scheduled to appear at the Konstang Festival on 9 August. Along with The Who, Pentangle, Fairport Convention, Alan Price, Graham Bond, Alexis Korner and others, Warm Dust were booked to appear at the Yorkshire Folk, Blues and Jazz Festival that ran from the 14th to 15 August. On the 20th, 21st and 22nd of that month, they were to appear at festivals in Denmark, Sweden and Finland respectively.

It was reported by the September 1970 issue of Beat Instrumental that Warm Dust had begun work on their next LP. Also that month, Del Taylor the manager for the group had his car stolen and his home burgled.

It was mentioned in the 24 October 1970 issue of Cash Box that Trend label acts, Warm Dust and Swegas were the first to be part of a three-year deal that Trend had signed with Philips for sole distribution in the UK and Germany. Prior to the deal, Trend which was part of the Class International group was using Pye since its inception about a year back.

The 28 November issue of Melody Maker had a short review of a Fleetwood Mac concert with a good deal of it being about Warm Dust who opened for them. Reviewer Alan Kilburn said that Fleetwood Mac were given a lesson in musicianship by this unknown group who were big on the continent. Kilburn said that Warm Dust opened the show with some interesting sounds and an unusual feature on some numbers with two organs being used. Kilburn said that the two reedmen, John Surguy and Alan Soloman were outstanding. And in comparison, Fleetwood Mac sounded dull and the absence of Peter Green was felt.

The album And it Came to Pass was reviewed in issue 12 of the German magazine, Hi Fi Sterophonie which was published in December, 1970. It received 7 for musikalische bewertung (musical rating), 7 for repertoirewert (repertoire value), 8 for aufnahme-, klangqualität (recording and sound quality), and 7 for oberfläche (surface). The review even though not complementary to the vocals was positive about the musicianship.

The album, Peace for Our Time was one of the "Mirror Picks" in the 26 December issue of Record Mirror. It was reviewed in a positive light. However, the ambitiousness and lack of impact the album had was noted. The reviewer finished off saying, "But there is a theme and it's a sound one".

=== 1971 - 1972 ===
According to an article "War, peace and Warm Dust" by Andrew Means in the 30 January 1971 issue of Melody Maker, with Warm Dust being more appreciated on the continent, the group was to make their first appearance in France on 6 and 7 February. Their single, "It's A Beautiful Day" bw "Worm Dance" had just been released as well. Apparently, the B side wasn't representative of their sound.

On 16 April 1971 the band met Pope Paul VI in Vatican City, who was "startled" when Bedson asked why the Catholic Church didn't ban war. They were referred to as "loutish" in the 18 April 1971 issue of Sunday Mirror.

The group's single, "It's a Beautiful Day" was reviewed by Peter Jones in the 24 April issue of Record Mirror. he acknowledged that the band was well thought of and ambitious. But he didn't see great things for the single saying that it was incisive bit of writing and performing that shuddered along.

Warm Dust were supposed to appear on Radio One's Speak Easy Show and meet and take part in a discussion with the Archbishop of Canterbury on 2 May. The peace-oriented show was to have participation by representatives of two groups that Warm Dust supported, CND and Amnesty International. The compere was to be Jimmy Savile. The venue where the show was to be recorded was at BBC's Paris Studios in Lower Regent Street London. The reason given for the Warm Dust no-show was that they were in the middle of an extensive European tour, and on the night in question they would be playing a German concert. According to Del Taylor their manager, they were disappointed that they couldn't attend. They actually wanted the archbishop to answer the questions that they asked the Pope about why religious leaders weren't using their powers to stop war. They had actually handed the Pope a letter which was addressed to all heads of government.

The group was booked to appear at the Reading Festival on Friday, 25 June 1971. On that Day, Arthur Brown, Daddy Loglegs, Bell & Arc, Ricotti/Albuquerque, Armada, Accrington Stanley and Anno Domini were also booked to appear. They were the last band to play on that day and had to endure the rain.

It was reported in the July 1971 issue of Beat Instrumental that Warm Dust were recording a very overdue single at De Lane Lea studios under the direction of Del Lawrence.

Their Peace For Our Time album which had been released on Trend TNLS 6001, was released in the US on Uni 73109. Tt was given a four star rating by Billboard in the 28 August 1971 issue. It was also released in Italy on Stateside 3C 062-92228. With their album debuting on the Uni label in the United States, they were pictured in the 18 September issue of Cash Box with the Pope blessing their album. This event had actually happened some time earlier (April) and the group appeared on the front pages of various news papers around the world.

A profile article about Alan Solomon appeared in the April 1972 issue of Beat Instrumental. It mentioned that with the burst of the Woodstock bubble, the group was still gaining credibility in Europe, but the English had no interest in them. It appears that Warm Dust was too into their music. It dawned on the group some time in 1971 that "long freaky, instrumental parts" weren't what the audiences wanted to hear, so the group changed things musically and became more info rock.

In 1972, their album Dreams of Impossibilities was released in Germany on BASF 2229082-4.

== Breakup ==
The group is believed to have broken up in 1972.

== Later years ==
It was through a mutual friend Tony Gomez that Keith Bailey, along with Chris Francis, Frank Robert met Jim Dvorak to form the group Joy. Ernest Mothle was another member. They played around clubs and other venues and became quite popular and recorded an album for in 1976 for Cadillac Records.

Paul Carrack said in a 1982 interview with Scott MacCaughey of The Rocket that with Warm Dust, it was the be-all and end-all and that they were on the road permanently and never had any money. He also said that the music would now come over quite pretentious, but back then they thought it was extremely valid and necessary and they had a following in Germany as that's what the people go for.

The Peace for Our Time album was re-released in 2013 on Soundvision 03505.

== Members ==
- Paul Carrack - organ, piano, electric piano, guitar, timpani, percussion, backing vocals
- Alan King, guitar
- Terry "Tex" Comer - bass, percussion, guitar, recorder
- Alan Solomon - saxophone, flute, oboe, piano, synthesizer
- John Surguy - saxophone, flute, oboe, vibraphone, clarinet, guitar, backing vocals
- Dave Pepper - drums, percussion (on And It Came To Pass)
- Les Walker - lead vocals, harmonica, percussion, guitar aka (Dransfield Walker)?
- Keith Bailey - drums, congas, maracas, backing vocals (on Peace For Our Time)
- John Bedson - drums, percussion (on Third Album)

== Discography ==
=== Uk or where otherwise specified ===
Singles
Act	Release	Catalogue	Year	Notes
Warm Dust	"It's a Beautiful Day"/"Worm Dance"	Trend 6099 002	1971	
Warm Dust	"Mr Media" / "Keep On Trucking"	Trend 2C 006-92.977 M	1971	French release

Albums
Act	Release	Catalogue	Year	Notes
Warm Dust	And It Came to Pass	Trend TNLS 700	May 1970	Also released in Germany on Metronome 2/400002 in 1970
Warm Dust	Peace for Our Time	Trend TNLS 6001	Dec 1970	Also released in the US on Uni 73109
Warm Dust	Warm Dust (also called Third Album)	BASF 0 29055-7	1972	German release

Compilation albums
Act	Release	Catalogue	Year	Notes
Warm Dust	Dreams of Impossibilities	BASF 22 29082-4	1972	German only release

== Televised performances ==
=== Beat-Club 62 - 31.12.1970 ===
- 1-16 –Warm Dust Indian Rope Man
- 1-17 –Warm Dust Worm Dance Part 1
- 1-18 –Warm Dust Worm Dance Part 2
