= Cadillac (record label) =

Jazz record label founded in the United Kingdom in 1973

- Founded: 1971
- Founder: John Jack, Mike Westbrook
- Status: Active
- Distributor(s): Cadillac Jazz Distribution, Cadillac Distribution
- Genre: Jazz
- Country of origin: United Kingdom

Cadillac is a jazz record company and label in the United Kingdom. It has released recordings by notable jazz artists. It has been in operation since the early 1970s and continues info the present day.

== Background ==
It was established in 1971 by John Jack and Mike Westbrook and its first release was in 1973. Its catalogue includes Harry Beckett, Mike Osborne, Stan Tracey, Trevor Watts, and Bobby Wellins.

== History ==
Joy was a jazz group who recorded an album, Joy for Cadillac in 1976. The group was made up of members from the UK, US, Caribbean and South Africa. The musicians on the album were James Dvorak on trumpet, Frank Roberts on piano, Ernest Mothle on bass, Keith Bailey on drums, and Chris Francis on alto saxophone. Years later, Cadillac Records got in touch with the surviving members of the band. Unfortunately, Ernest Mothle, the South African bassist had since died. However, Cadillac discovered that drummer Keith Bailey was already working on a reissue. Getting hold of the master tapes turned out to be well worth the effort. In addition to the vinyl record album being re-released, there were additional recordings for the compact disc's release.

In October 2023 the label celebrated its fiftieth year. The event was held at the Cafe OTO where some of the key people in UK jazz were in attendance. A film, The Real McGregor, a 1967 film about Chris McGregor and his group, The Blue Notes had been unearthed by Dr Paul DJ Moody, and for the first time in about a half a century was shown at the event. The event was filmed at the cafe which was full to capacity.

On Thursday 7 December 2023, Cadillac Records received a Presto award for the Joy album re-release for the "Best Archive/Reissue" of the Year album. Due to Mike Westbrook being unable to attend, Matthew Wright accepted it on his behalf. There to present the award was Barney Whittaker of Presto Music.

== CDs ==
Catalogue number	Artist	Album title	Release date
SGC/MELCD201	Christie Brothers Stompers	Christie Brothers Stompers	
SGC/MELCD202	Crane River Jazz Band	Crane River Jazz Band	
SGC/MELCD203	Joe Harriott Quintet	Swings High	
SGC77CD02	Ken Colyer	The Real Ken Colyer	
SGCASCD1	Phi Lee and Jeff Clyne	Twice upon a Time	
SGCCCD02	Dave Holdsworth/Liane Carroll Quartet	Ten Day Simon	8 May 1990
SGCCD04	Stan Tracey Quartet	For Heaven's Sake	
SGCCD05	Bobby Wellins Quartet	Don't Worry 'Bout Me	1997
SGCCD06	Stan Tracey	Solo:Trio	
SGCD007	Dudu Pukwana/ Bob Stuckey/ Phil Lee/ John Marshall/ Terry Smith/ Martin Hart	Night Time is the Right Time	
SGCCD08/09	David Murray	The London Concert	
SGCCD010/011	Mike Osborne Trio	The Birmingham Jazz Concert	
SGCCD12/13	Johnny Mbizo Dyani	Rejoice + Together	2014
SGCCD14/15	Stan Tracey & Mike Osborne	Alone & Together – Wigmore Hall 1974	
SGCCD16	The Mike Westbrook Concert Band	The Last Night At The Old Place	25 May 2018
SGCCD 022	Joy	Joy	2023

== See also ==
- Ogun Records
- List of record labels
