= One on One (Yazz album) =

Studio album by Yazz
- Released: 18 April 1994
- Recorded: September 1993 – January 1994
- Label: Polydor
- Producers: Jonathan Wales; Paul Jervier; Steve Jervier; Danny Schogger; Jolley-Harris-Jolley; Wayne Brown; Stephen Lipson; Drummer Zeb

Yazz chronology
The Wanted Remixes (1989)	One on One (1994)	The Natural Life (1997)

Professional ratings
Review scores
Source	Rating
AllMusic	2/5 stars
Select	2/5 medals

One on One is the second studio album by British pop singer Yazz, released on 18 April 1994 by Polydor Records, more than five years after her debut album, Wanted (1988). It contains the UK top 40 hit single "How Long", a duet with Aswad.

== Background ==
Yazz commenced recording sessions for a second album with Big Life Records in 1989, as the follow-up to Wanted. Following the release of the "Treat Me Good" single (UK No. 20, SUI No. 28, NED No. 48, GER No. 55, AUS No. 100) in June 1990, an album titled Revolution of Love was scheduled for release, but was ultimately shelved when Yazz parted with the record company.

Following the release of Yazz's first single with Polydor Records in March 1992, "One True Woman" (UK No. 60), an album of the same name was planned for release in May 1992, but was cancelled. Several tracks recorded for this album ended up on One on One, eventually released two years later, although "One True Woman" was not among them.

== Singles ==
Three singles were released from the album: a cover version of the Ace song "How Long" (UK No. 31, GER No. 52), "Have Mercy" (UK No. 42, GER No. 86), and a cover version of The Korgis' "Everybody's Got to Learn Sometime" (UK No. 56). The album failed to chart, however.

== Track listing ==
No.	Title	Writer(s)	Length
1.	"Have Mercy"	Albert Hammond; Shelly Peiken	4:23
2.	"Calling to You"	Yazz; Wayne Brown	4:01
3.	"Child"	Yazz; Danny Schogger; Andy Caine	4:11
4.	"One on One"	Yazz; Schogger; Charlie Dore	3:42
5.	"How Long" (featuring Aswad)	Paul Carrack	3:56
6.	"Back in Love Again"	Yazz; Brown; Stephen Menzies	4:02
7.	"Baby Talk"	Yazz; Dave Harris; Paul Fishman	4:19
8.	"Everybody's Got to Learn Sometime"	James Warren	4:26
9.	"Look of Love"	Burt Bacharach; Hal David	4:50
10.	"Live Your Life"	Yazz; Schogger	4:06
11.	"That's Just the Way That It Is"	Yazz; Brown	4:45
