= Slack Alice =

Slack Alice may refer to:

- An imaginary friend of comedian Larry Grayson and title of the B-side of his August 1972 single, "Shut That Door"
- A Manchester nightclub opened by footballer George Best in 1973
- A 1973 British band (1973) fronted by Sandra Barry

== See also ==
- Northumberlandia, a sculpture nicknamed "Slag Alice"
