= Reg King =

English singer (1945–2010)

- Also known as: Reggie King
- Born: Reginald King; 5 February 1945
- Origin: Paddington, London, England
- Died: 8 October 2010 (aged 65)
- Genres: Blue-eyed soul, pop
- Years active: 1964–2010
- Label: United Artists
- Formerly of: The Action

Reginald King (5 February 1945 – 8 October 2010), known professionally as Reg King or Reggie King, was an English singer, songwriter and record producer, most famous for being the solo and lead singer with The Boys and The Action. He died of cancer, aged 65, in October 2010.

== Early life ==
Reg King was born on 5 February 1945 in Paddington, West London. King and drummer Roger Powell had known each other since their schooldays, and were involved in the early days of the Scene Club in Soho, London, becoming pioneers in mod subculture and fashion.

== Career ==
King was lead singer and songwriter of the Boys (1963–1964) and the Action (1965–1968). His first venture into song-writing was for Sandra Barry, in which he penned "Really Gonna Shake" b/w "When We Get Married" in March 1964 on Decca. In 1967, King wrote the Action B-side's, "Twenty Four Hours" and "Something Has Hit Me", the latter co-written by King with Melody Maker journalist and flatmate Nick Jones. For the Action's Rolled Gold compilation album King wrote "Come Around", "Climbing Up The Wall" and of course, "Little Boy". In 1968, he produced Gary Farr's album Take Something With You (1969) on Marmalade Records.

=== Solo career ===
In 1971, King released his first self-titled solo album on United Artists. It was accompanied by B.B. Blunder (ex-Blossom Toes) and Mighty Baby (former band members), along with other guest musicians such as Mick Taylor, Steve Winwood (credited as Mystery Man), Brian Auger and Danny McCulloch. This album was self-produced, and co-written by Peter Dale and King. An earlier version of "Little Boy" and "In My Dreams" (co-written with Alan "Bam" King), also appears on the Action compilation album titled Rolled Gold. King also collaborated with B.B. Blunder and released a single "Little Boy" b/w "10,000 Miles" – songs from King's album. The 1971 self-titled album was digitally remastered and re-released in 2023, with bonus material in CD format.

King's EP, Missing in Action (2007) was released on Circle Records. His second solo album, Looking For A Dream (2013) was released posthumously, also on Circle Records. The majority of the songs was written by King himself, except for "Get Up, Get Away" and "Suddenly" which he co-wrote with Kevin Westlake.

== Death ==
King died of cancer, aged 65, on 8 October 2010 in Belvedere, London Borough of Bexley. He was buried at Hillview Cemetery in Welling, London Borough of Bexley. His grave was unmarked as grave 190, until fan Paul Anderson tracked down the resting place of Reginald King in October 2020. King's grave plaque was adorned with the inscription 'Never Ever think of bad times, just remember the glad times'. There was a previous campaign for a headstone in 2017, but nothing became of it.

== Solo discography ==
=== Albums ===
==== Reg King (1971) ====
The eponymous solo LP was released by United Artists records, and features members of B.B. Blunder (ex-Blossom Toes) and Mighty Baby (ex-The Action), with Mick Taylor, Steve Winwood, Brian Auger and Danny McCulloch.

The album was reissued in 2006 by Circle Records, the CD has 6 bonus tracks.

No.	Title	Writer(s)	Length
1.	"Must Be Something Else Around"	King	3:34
2.	"You Go Have Yourself A Good Time"	King; Peter Dale	3:15
3.	"That Ain't Living"	King; Dale	6:45
4.	"In My Dreams"	King; Alan King	3:53
5.	"Little Boy"	King	3:26
6.	"10,000 Miles"	King; Dale	3:21
7.	"Down The Drain"	King; Dale	6:09
8.	"Savannah"	King; Dale	11:51
9.	"Gone Away"	King; Dale	2:39

==== Looking For a Dream (2013) ====
This collection is a second, previously unreleased album, issued again by Circle Records, under his nickname Reggie King.

No.	Title	Writer(s)	Length
1.	"Get Up, Get Away"	King; Kevin Westlake	2:44
2.	"Let Me See Some Love In Your Eyes"	King	2:48
3.	"You Gotta Believe Me"	King	3:05
4.	"All Up To Heaven"	King	2:30
5.	"So Full Of Love"	King	4:15
6.	"Merry Go Round"	King	3:27
7.	"Suddenly"	King; Westlake	2:55
8.	"Picking Up Nancy's Grin"	King	3:22
9.	"In And Out"	King	3:13
10.	"Put Something Together"	King	5:38
11.	"Live Forever"	King	3:00
12.	"Magenta"	King	5:56
13.	"Thinkin' 'Bout Getting Out"	King	3:12
14.	"They Must Be Talking 'Bout Me"	King	5:10
15.	"You'll Be Around"	King	3:51

=== Singles ===
Reg King and B.B. Blunder:

- "Little Boy" b/w "10,000 Miles" (United Artists UP 35204) 1971

=== EPs ===
==== Missing In Action (2007) ====
10"/6-Track EP (Circle Records CPW E10-101, 2007)

Side 1

No.	Title	Writer(s)	Length
1.	"Merry-Go-Round"	King	3:27
2.	"You Go Have Yourself A Good Time"	King; Dale	3:54
3.	"Magenta"	King	5:56

Side 2

No.	Title	Writer(s)	Length
1.	"So Full Of Love"	King	4:16
2.	"10,000 Miles"	King; Dale	3:20
3.	"Must Be Something Else Around"	King	4:31

=== Compilation albums ===
- The track "Gone Away" appears on United Artists Records 1971 sampler All Good Clean Fun (UDX 201/2)
- The single "Little Boy" appears on the 2004 EMI CD re-package of All Good Clean Fun (Liberty 8660902)
