= Five-A-Side =

Studio album by Ace
- Released: 1974
- Genres: Pop rock; soft rock
- Length: 35:33
- Label: Anchor
- Producer: John Anthony

Ace chronology
Five-A-Side (1974)	Time for Another (1975)

Professional ratings
Review scores
Source	Rating
AllMusic	4.5/5 stars
Christgau's Record Guide	C+
The Rolling Stone Record Guide	2/5 stars

Five-A-Side is the debut album by the pop rock band Ace, released by Anchor Records in 1974.

The album landed on the Billboard 200 chart, reaching No. 11 in 1974.

The single "How Long" reached No. 3 on the Billboard Hot 100 in the spring of 1975. The song also reached No. 24 on the Adult Contemporary chart, No. 3 on the Canadian Singles Chart, and No. 20 on the UK Singles Chart on 9 November 1974. The song "Rock & Roll Runaway" peaked at No. 71 on the Billboard Hot 100 in 1975.

The album was recorded at Rockfield Studios near Monmouth in Wales and at Trident Studios in London, England. It was produced by John Anthony.

== Track listing ==
All songs written by Paul Carrack, except where noted.

1. "Sniffin' About" (Carrack, Alan King) – 4:44
2. "Rock & Roll Runaway" (Carrack, Terry Comer, Phil Harris, King) – 3:08
3. "How Long" – 3:21
4. "The Real Feeling" – 2:23
5. "24 Hours" – 4:00
6. "Why?" – 3:43
7. "Time Ain't Long" (Carrack, Jes Walker) – 3:53
8. "Know How It Feels" – 3:27
9. "Satellite" – 3:00
10. "So Sorry Baby" (Harris) – 3:54

== Personnel ==
- Phil Harris – lead guitar, vocals
- Alan "Bam" King – rhythm guitar, vocals
- Paul Carrack – organ, vocals, piano, electric piano
- Terry "Tex" Comer – bass
- Fran Byrne – drums, percussion

Additional personnel

- Chris Hughes – horns (5, 9)
- Bud Beadle – horns (5)
- Mick Eves – horns (5)

Technical

- Dennis Mackay, John Anthony, Mike Stone, Pat Anthony, Pat Moran – engineers
- Neil Kernon, Peter Fielder – tape ops

== Chart history ==
=== Album ===
==== Weekly ====
Chart (1975)	Peak position
Canada Top Albums/CDs (RPM)	16
US Billboard 200	11

==== Year-end ====
Chart (1975)	Position
US Billboard 200	94

=== Singles ===
Year	Single	Chart	Peak position
1975	"How Long"	Billboard Hot 100	3
1975	"How Long"	US Adult Contemporary Chart	24
1975	"How Long"	Canadian Singles Chart	3
1975	"How Long"	UK Singles Chart	20
1975	"How Long"	Canada Adult Contemporary (RPM)	31
1975	"Rock & Roll Runaway"	Billboard Hot 100	71
