= Anchor Records =

British record label

- Parent company: American Broadcasting Companies
- Founder: Ian Ralfini (co-founder)
- Country of origin: United Kingdom

Anchor Records was a UK-based record label, co-founded by Ian Ralfini and the American Broadcasting Companies, which owned ABC Records in the United States, in 1974. ABC Records marketed (distributed) Anchor albums in the US, and Anchor Records issued many ABC albums in the United Kingdom as "ABC Records Marketed by Anchor Records."

The Anchor Records label was black with silver print. The logo, at the top of the label, was a British sailor with an anchor behind him and the words "ANCHOR RECORDS LIMITED" above the sailor's hat and the word ANCHOR below. Anchor ceased operations in 1978, when ABC Records was purchased by MCA Records.

== Partial discography ==
=== Singles ===
- 16 528 AT: Stretch - Why Did You Do It / Write Me A Note (7")
- ANC 1002: Ace - How Long (7")
- ANC 1004: Brett Smiley - Va Va Va Voom / Space Ace (7")
- ANC 1008: Phillip [sic] & Vanessa - Two Sleepy People / You Know (7") [1974]
- ANC 1017: Philip & Vanessa - Love / Baby I Loved You (7") [1975]
- ANC 1021: Stretch - Why Did You Do It? (7")
- ANC 1043: The Adverts - Gary Gilmore's Eyes / Bored Teenagers (7")
- ANC 1045: Wesley - Mickey Mouse, Donald Duck, Goofy & the Gang / Don't It Make Your Blue Eyes Cry (7")
- ANC 1046: Steel Pulse - Nyah Luv (7")
- ANC 1047: The Adverts - Safety In Numbers / We Who Wait (7")
- ANC 1054: Kate Robbins - Tomorrow / Crowds Of You (7")
- ANC 1061: Donna McGhee - Do As I Do / Mr. Blindman (12")
- ABE 12003: Steely Dan - Do It Again (12")
- AN 21005: CADO BELLE - AIRPORT SHUTDOWN (7") MONO/STEREO 1976 - PROMO NFS
- 45-A-22: Ray King - I Confess/Call Me Darling (7") Mono

=== Albums ===
- ANCL 2001: Ace - Five-A-Side
- ANCL 2002: Sam Leno - Ordinary Man
- ANCL 2003: Philip & Vanessa - Two Sleepy People
- ANCL 2005: Blue Goose - Blue Goose
- ANCL 2006: Susan Webb - Bye-Bye Pretty Baby
- ANCL 2007: Aj Webber - Aj Webber
- ANCL 2008: Cole Younger - Cole Younger
- ANCL 2010: Moonrider - Moonrider
- ANCL 2011: Alice Cooper - Welcome to My Nightmare
- ANCL 2012: Paxton Brothers - The Paxton Brothers (James and Frank Paxton)
- ANCL 2013: Ace - Time For Another
- ANCL 2014: Stretch - Elastique
- ANCL 2015: Cado Belle - Cado Belle [1976] Scottish
- ANCL 2016: Stretch - You Can't Beat Your Brain For Entertainment
- ANCL 2017: Patti Boulaye - Patti Boulaye
- ANCL 2018: John Weider - John Weider
- ANCL 2019: Sioux - Sioux
- ANCL 2020: Ace - No Strings
- ANCL 2021: Scrounger - Snap
- ANCL 2022: George Hamilton IV - Fine Lace and Homespun Cloth
- ANCL 2023: Stretch - Lifeblood
- ANCL 2026: George Hamilton IV - Feel Like a Million
- ANCL 2027: Donna McGhee - Make It Last Forever

UK issues of US ABC albums:

- Anchor ABCL-5005: Easy Rider: - Easy Rider (Soundtrack)
- Anchor ABCL-5019: Ralph Burns: - Cabaret (Soundtrack)
- Anchor ABCL-5073: Nelson Riddle - Paint Your Wagon (Soundtrack)
- Anchor ABCL-5146: B. J. Thomas - Help Me Make It (To My Rockin' Chair)
- Anchor ABCL-5156: Joe Walsh - You Can't Argue with a Sick Mind
- Anchor ABCL-5160: Amazing Rhythm Aces - Too Stuffed to Jump
- Anchor ABCL-5240: Joe Walsh - So Far So Good

== See also ==
- List of record labels
