= How Long (Ace song) =

1975 single by Ace

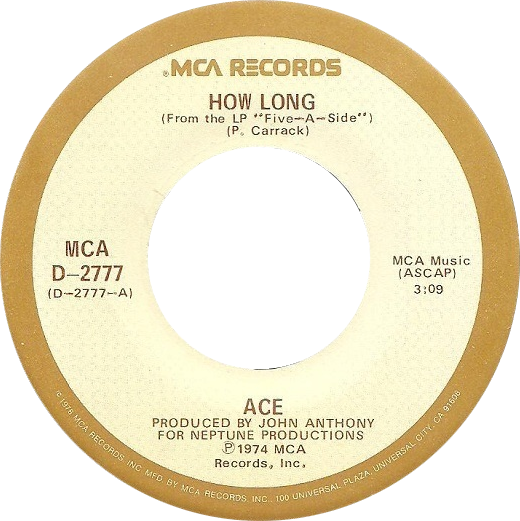
- 1979 US reissue by MCA Records

Single by Ace

from the album Five-A-Side
- B-side: "Sniffin' About"
- Released: March 1975 (U.S.)
- Recorded: 1974
- Studio: Trident Studios, Rockfield Studios
- Genre: Soft rock; pub rock; pop
- Length: 3:21 (Album version); 3:09 (Single version)
- Label: Anchor
- Songwriter: Paul Carrack
- Producer: John Anthony

Ace singles chronology
"How Long" (1975)	"I Ain't Gonna Stand for This" (1975)

Music video
- Ace (with Paul Carrack) – How Long • TopPop on YouTube

Alternative release
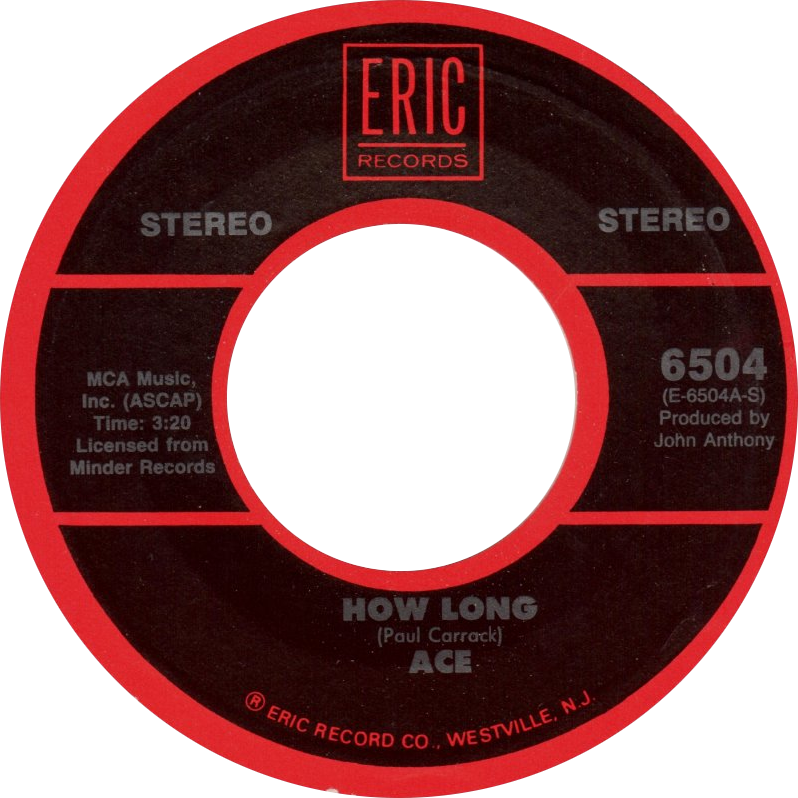
- US reissue by Eric Records

"How Long" is the debut single by the English band Ace, from their 1974 debut album, Five-A-Side. It reached No. 3 on both the US and Canadian charts, and No. 20 on the UK Singles Chart.

In a 1981 issue of Smash Hits, Phil Collins named the song as one of his top 10 favourites, describing it as a "classic single".

== Background ==
Although widely interpreted as being about infidelity, the song was in fact composed by lead singer Paul Carrack upon discovering that bassist Terry "Tex" Comer had been secretly working with the Sutherland Brothers and Quiver.

The guitar solo is by lead guitarist Phil Harris. Alan "Bam" King was the band's rhythm guitarist, formerly with the Action. Lead vocals are by Paul Carrack.

The band had originally tried to record the song as a Motown-type single for Anchor Records, but gave up in favour of recording their first album at Rockfield Studios in Wales. The song was recorded for the album.

In March 2020 – 45 years after its original release, and in the weeks following its use in an advertisement for Amazon Prime – the song returned to the charts, reaching No. 1 on Billboard's Rock Digital Song Sales chart, selling 4,000 downloads, with 831,000 streams and an increase in sales of more than 2,000%.

== Personnel ==
- Phil Harris – lead guitar, vocals
- Alan "Bam" King – rhythm guitar, vocals
- Paul Carrack – lead vocals, organ, piano, electric piano
- Terry "Tex" Comer – bass
- Fran Byrne – drums, percussion

== Charts ==
=== Weekly charts ===
Chart (1975)	Peak position
Australia (Kent Music Report)	63
Canada Top Singles (RPM)	3
Canada Adult Contemporary (RPM)	31
Netherlands (Single Tip)	11
Poland (LP3)	16
UK Singles (Official Charts)	20
US Billboard Hot 100	3
US Billboard Adult Contemporary	24
US Cash Box Top 100	1

Chart (2020)	Peak position
US Hot Rock & Alternative Songs (Billboard)	8

=== Year-end charts ===
Chart (1975)	Rank
Canada	42
US Billboard Hot 100	58
US Cash Box Top 100	47

== Cover versions ==
- Australian band Scandal charted in the top 50 of the Kent Music Report with their version. It is from their only album release Scandal (1978).
- Lipps Inc., in 1980, hit No. 4 on the U.S. dance chart, No. 29 on the U.S. soul singles chart, No. 42 in Canada (2 weeks), and No. 44 in Australia. Their cover version sold one million units in Mexico.
- Rod Stewart, in 1981, charted in the top 50 of the UK Singles Chart and US Billboard Hot 100 and No. 26 in Ireland. It was included on his album Tonight I'm Yours.
- In 1993, British reggae group Aswad and singer Yazz reached No. 31 on the UK Singles Chart, with their take from Yazz's 1994 album One on One.
- Composer and original vocalist Paul Carrack recorded a solo version for his 1995 album Blue Views. It reached No. 32 on the UK chart.
- In 2025, The Horne Section performed the 'how-long-athon', where they played the song for over 24 straight hours without stopping as a fundraiser for Stand Up to Cancer. They repeated the song's chorus and verse ad infinitum, and were joined by various celebrity guests throughout the day.

== See also ==
- List of one-hit wonders in the United States
