= All Good Clean Fun =

Compilation album by various artists
- Released: 1971
- Genre: Progressive rock, folk rock
- Label: United Artists Records (UK)
- Producer: various

2004 Boxset cover
- Album cover for the 2004 CD Boxset

All Good Clean Fun was originally a promotional sampler issued by United Artists Records (UDX 201/2) in 1971. This original release was a double album containing 23 tracks by 20 different artists, with three artists (Morning, The Nitty Gritty Dirt Band and Canned Heat) having two tracks each. Most of the artists had been signed by Andrew Lauder at Liberty Records, which was rebranded as United Artists in 1971, the year this sampler was issued. Both labels had been part of Transamerica Corporation since 1968.

To promote the album, 'The All Good Clean Fun Tour' was undertaken to Switzerland by Man, Help Yourself and Gypsy. This gave rise to the song "All Good Clean Fun" on Man's Do You Like It Here Now, Are You Settling In? album.

All Good Clean Fun – A Journey through the Underground of Liberty United Artists Records 1969–1975 was released by EMI (Liberty 8660902) in 2004. This release is a triple CD with 39 tracks from 25 artists, although many of the solo artists are also represented by work made within groups. As with other EMI sampler re-issues, such as A Breath of Fresh Air, the CD release borrows the original title, albeit adding a long subtitle, and uses a variation on the cover art, but incorporates fewer than half the tracks included on the original album. These tracks are augmented by other artists and additional tracks from some of the original artists, so this is a retrospective compilation, rather than a re-issue of the original promotional sampler.

== Original 1971 release ==
Side 1

1. "Spill the Wine" – Eric Burdon & War (4:53)
2. "Street Songs" – Help Yourself (5:35)
3. "Chicken Reel" – Nitty Gritty Dirt Band (0:59)
4. "Take Me Away" – Colin Scot (3:15)
5. "Here Comes Mr Time" – If (4:47)
6. "Daughter of the Fireplace" – Man (5:11)

Side 2

1. "Home Again" – Cochise (3:41)
2. "Dirt Roads" – Morning (1:30)
3. "Let Me Take You Home" – Gypsy (4:10)
4. "Song for Kathy" – Allan Taylor (3:32)
5. "Don't Want Me Round You" – Ernie Graham (4:30)
6. "Boogie Chillen No.2" (Excerpt) – Canned Heat & John Lee Hooker (6:10)

Side 3

1. "Cherry Red" – The Groundhogs (5:40)
2. "Hot Water" – Sugarloaf (4:10)
3. "Be Yourself" (Excerpt) – Hawkwind (5:45)
4. "Race from Here to Your Ears" – Amon Düül II (5:18)
5. "Roll Em Down" – Morning (3:05)

Side 4

1. "That's All Right Mama" – Canned Heat (4:18)
2. "Funk Angel" – Brinsley Schwarz (4:16)
3. "Gone Away" – Reg King (2:35)
4. "Yukon Railroad" – Nitty Gritty Dirt Band (2:20)
5. "Joy" (excerpt) – Sweet Pain (4:25)
6. "The Seed" – B. B. Blunder (5:35)

== 2004 CD re-release ==
Disc 1

1. "The Intro and the Outro" – Bonzo Dog Doo-Dah Band
2. "The Birthday" – The Idle Race
3. "Blue Narcissus" – Hapshash and the Coloured Coat
4. "Father Cannot Yell" – Can
5. "Mistreated" – The Groundhogs
6. "Futilist's Lament" – High Tide
7. "Hurry Up John" – The Idle Race
8. "Be Yourself" (Excerpt) – Hawkwind
9. "Country Girl" – Brinsley Schwarz
10. "Daughter of the Fireplace" – Man
11. "Street Songs" – Help Yourself
12. "Blankman Cries Again" – High Tide
13. "Velvet Mountain" – Cochise
14. "Strange Town" – Groundhogs
15. "Take Me Away" – Colin Scot

Disc 2

1. "The Seed" – B. B. Blunder
2. "Here Comes Mr Time" – If
3. "You Shouldn't Do That" – Hawkwind
4. "Let Me Take You Home" – Gypsy
5. "Our Captain Cried All Hands" – Allan Taylor
6. "Little Boy" – Reg King
7. "Manillo" – Man
8. "Paperhouse" – Can
9. "Cherry Red" – The Groundhogs
10. "Eddie Waring" – Help Yourself, with Deke Leonard and B J Cole
11. "The Strain" – The Bonzo Dog Band

Disc 3

1. "Bananas" – Man
2. "You Had a Lesson" – The Groundhogs
3. "Home Again" – Cochise
4. "Reaffirmation" – Help Yourself
5. "How Sweet to Be an Idiot" – Neil Innes
6. "Razor Blade and Rattlesnake" – Deke Leonard
7. "Ejection (Single Version)" – Robert Calvert
8. "Living in the World Today" – Neutrons
9. "Iron Horse / Born to Lose" – Motörhead
10. "(What's so Funny 'Bout) Peace Love and Understanding" – Brinsley Schwarz
11. "The Psychedelic Warlords (Disappear In Smoke)" – Hawkwind
12. "Out of My Tree" – Clive John
13. "Unusual" – Roger Ruskin Spear
