= Joy (Joy album) =

Studio album by Joy
- Released: 1976
- Recorded: 22 March 1976
- Studio: Chalk Farm, London
- Genre: Jazz
- Length: 52:04
- Label: Cadillac
- Producer: John Jack

Joy is a jazz album by the group Joy that was originally released in 1976. It was re-released in May 2023 to positive reception.

== Background and release ==
The group Joy was made up of members from the UK, US, Caribbean and South Africa. The musicians that played on the album were James Dvorak on trumpet, Frank Roberts on piano, Ernest Mothle on bass, Keith Bailey on drums, and Chris Francis on alto saxophone.

=== Original release ===
The recording session took place on 22 March 1976 at Chalk Farm Studio in London. The album was engineered by Vic Keary and the producer for the album was John Jack. The recording session was apparently subsidized by the Greater London Arts Association and done in a day.

The album was originally released in 1976 on Cadillac (SGC 1006).

=== Re-release ===
The band's label, Cadillac Records got in touch with the surviving members of the band. Ernest Mothle, the South African musician who played bass, had since died. However they discovered that drummer Keith Bailey was already working on a reissue. Getting hold of the master tapes was a worthwhile exercise. In addition to the vinyl record album re-release, there were additional recordings for the compact disc.

Chris Francis the saxophonist was interviewed by Mike Gavin of UK Jazz News, which was published on 10 August 2023.

== Reception ==
Mike Hobart of the Financial Times reviewed the album which was published on 26 May 2023. Giving it four stars out of five, he referred to it as a "fascinating, and indeed joyous, recording from 1976". He also noted that there were two tracks on the album that were edited down. He said that they were presented in full on the CD version. He also said that the "album sounds remarkably fresh today."

In his 12 June 2023 review on the album, Russell Perry of WTJU 91.1 FM referred to it as "An important, if fleeting, moment in UK jazz" and "As fresh as tomorrow".

Nick Lea of Jazz Views published his review on 26 July. He said that the group was active for British Jazz, the 1970s and the group's contribution shouldn't be overlooked. He also noted that the drummer on the album was Keith Bailey and that he led the bands Orbit and Prana. He said that "Martini Sweet, the opening track was perfect to get the band going and the alto-sax of Chris Francis pushing the boundaries and then getting back into the feel. He also mentioned the soloing and abilities of the other members and said that it was a wholly satisfying album, while making it known that this was the only recording from a fine group.

Recognized as a "Best Archive/Reissue" of the Year album, the label Cadillac Records received a Presto award in 2023. Mike Westbrook who was the label's co-founder was unable to attend the presentation so it was accepted by Matthew Wright. Wright was pictured with Barney Whittaker of Presto Music in the article about the presentation.

== Track listing ==
Side one

1. "Martini Suite" (F. Roberts) – 6:21
2. "Koko V Dank" (F. Roberts, J. Dvorak) – 5:40
3. "Do You Know the Way" (F. Roberts) – 6:47
4. "Spirals" (K. Bailey) – 6:32

Side two

1. "P. M." (J. Dvorak) – 5:17
2. "Jak's Travels" (J. Dvorak) – 4:09
3. "Forbidden Flight" (F. Roberts) – 4:23
4. "Tribute" (C. Francis) – 6:58
5. "Hidden Spirits" (F. Roberts) – 5:57
