= The Only Way Is Up =

1980 song by Otis Clay

Single by Otis Clay

from the album The Only Way Is Up
- B-side: "Special Kind of Love"
- Released: 1980
- Genre: Disco; soul; funk
- Length: 3:46
- Label: Echo
- Songwriters: George Jackson; Johnny Henderson
- Producers: Otis Clay; Troy Thompson

"The Only Way Is Up" is a song written by George Jackson and Johnny Henderson and originally released in 1980 as a single by American soul singer Otis Clay. In 1988, it became a chart-topping single in the United Kingdom for Yazz and the Plastic Population.

== Otis Clay version ==
The song was written by George Jackson and Johnny Henderson. It was first recorded by Otis Clay and released as a single by Echo Records in 1980. Though not a hit, the song became the title track of Clay's album The Only Way Is Up, released in Japan in 1982 and then North America in 1985. It is also included on his 2012 album Truth Is.

== Yazz version ==
"The Only Way Is Up"

Single by Yazz and the Plastic Population

from the album Wanted
- B-side: "Bad House Music"
- Released: July 11, 1988
- Genre: Dance-pop; acid house; house
- Length: 4:27 (album version); 4:02 (7-inch edit)
- Label: Big Life
- Songwriters: George Jackson; Johnny Henderson
- Producer: Coldcut

Yazz singles chronology
"Doctorin' the House" (1988)	"The Only Way Is Up" (1988)	"Stand Up for Your Love Rights" (1988)

Music video
- "The Only Way Is Up" on YouTube

Audio
- "The Only Way Is Up (Extended Version)" on YouTube

The Yazz version was produced by Jonathan More and Matt Black (better known as dance duo Coldcut, who had worked with British singer Yazz on their hit single "Doctorin' the House"). "The Only Way Is Up" was Yazz's first solo single, credited to her under the name Yazz and the Plastic Population. Released in July 1988 by Big Life as the first single from her debut album, Wanted (1988), the song became an instant smash hit, spending five weeks at the top of the UK Singles Chart, and ultimately becoming Britain's second biggest-selling single of 1988. Also on the Eurochart Hot 100, it soared to the number one position. In the United States it reached number two on the Billboard dance chart, although only making number 96 on the Billboard Hot 100.

A 2009 remix was released in the United Kingdom on September 7, 2009.

=== Background and release ===
After leaving school, Yazz got a job in a nightclub in Soho and got into her first band called The Biz. She also worked as a model and then met the managers of Wham! who would be her managers. She took singing lessons and made demo songs that was introduced to electronic music duo Coldcut. Together, they wrote "Doctorin' the House" which incorporates samples from various sources, mainly TV and film dialogue. It reached number six on the UK Singles Chart in March 1988 and was a club staple. The next song they would release was "The Only Way Is Up".

Yazz told in a 1988 interview, "It was first suggested that Coldcut do a remake of the track. But they weren't keen because they felt they might spoil the original, but I felt it would be perfect for me." Coldcut decided, however, to take on the production role. Yazz expanded, "It was a real challenge for them to work with a live vocalist, as well as for me for my first single. With "Doctorin' the House" they had laid down the groove and then said 'OK, now sing over it.' This time the song was arranged and structured before we even started recording." Their house version of "The Only Way Is Up" was released in July 1988, and become a huge hit in the clubs and on the charts.

=== Critical reception ===
Bill Coleman from Billboard magazine named the song a "annoyingly catchy disco/pop smash". Pan-European magazine Music & Media wrote, "Produced by Coldcut, this is an electro-soul number with more than a touch of house influences. A good, radio-friendly, dance song." Matthew Collin from Record Mirror declared it as "a tale of love under stress, dedication and survival, all set to an infectious house beat." He added, "'The Only Way Is Up' is where bad house music crashes into gay Seventies disco and ends up in the top 10." In 2025, Classic Pop ranked it number six in their list of "Top 20 Cover Versions of the 80s".

=== Chart performance ===
Yazz' cover of "The Only Way Is Up" was very successful globally. In Europe, it peaked at number-one in Belgium, Denmark, Ireland, Luxembourg, the Netherlands, Sweden and the United Kingdom. In the last of these, it hit the top spot in its third week at the UK Singles Chart, on July 31, 1988. The single spent a total of five weeks on the top of the chart, becoming the second biggest selling single of the year. It entered the top 10 also in Austria (5), Finland (3), France (4), West Germany (3), Iceland (9), Norway (5), and Switzerland (2). In the latter, it was held off reaching number-one by Koreana's "Hand In Hand". On the Eurochart Hot 100, the song hit number one in September 1988. Outside Europe, "The Only Way Is Up" hit number-one in New Zealand, while reaching number two in Australia and Israel. On the Billboard Hot Dance Club Play chart in the United States, it peaked at number two.

"The Only Way Is Up" earned a gold record in Australia and the UK, with a sale of 50,000 and 400,000 singles. And in France, it earned a silver record, after 200,000 units were sold there.

=== Music video ===
A music video was produced to promote the single. It was later made available on YouTube in 2018, and by June 2025, the video had generated more than 11 million views.

=== Formats and track listings ===
- 7-inch, CD, and cassette single
1. "The Only Way Is Up" — 4:02
2. "Bad House Music" — 4:28
- 12-inch maxi
1. "The Only Way Is Up" — 6:44
2. "Bad House Music" — 7:07
- 12-inch maxi
1. "The Only Way Is Up" (UK extended club mix) — 6:45
2. "The Only Way Is Up" (the up up up mix) — 7:01
3. "The Only Way Is Up" (acid dub) — 5:50
- CD maxi
1. "The Only Way Is Up" (7-inch edit) — 4:02
2. "The Only Way Is Up" (12-inch version) — 6:48
3. "The Only Way Is Up" (speng) — 6:01
4. "Bad House Music" — 3:00
- 12-inch maxi – Remixes
1. "The Only Way Is Up" (the Bam Bam remix) — 7:24
2. "The Only Way Is Up" (the up up up mix) — 7:24
3. "Bad House Music" — 4:28

=== Charts ===
==== Weekly charts ====
Chart (1988–89)	Peak position
Australia (ARIA)	2
Austria (Ö3 Austria Top 40)	5
Belgium (Ultratop 50 Flanders)	1
Denmark (IFPI)	1
Europe (Eurochart Hot 100)	1
France (SNEP)	4
Finland (Suomen virallinen lista)	3
Iceland (Íslenski Listinn Topp 10)	9
Ireland (IRMA)	1
Israel (Israeli Singles Chart)	2
Italy (Musica e dischi)	14
Italy Airplay (Music & Media)	5
Luxembourg (Radio Luxembourg)	1
Netherlands (Dutch Top 40)	1
Netherlands (Single Top 100)	1
New Zealand (Recorded Music NZ)	1
Norway (VG-lista)	5
Portugal (AFP)	4
Quebec (ADISQ)	41
Sweden (Sverigetopplistan)	1
Switzerland (Schweizer Hitparade)	2
UK Singles (Official Charts)	1
US Billboard Hot 100	96
US 12-inch Singles Sales (Billboard)	11
US Dance Club Play (Billboard)	2
West Germany (GfK)	3

==== Year-end charts ====
Chart (1988)	Position
Australia (ARIA)	31
Belgium (Ultratop 50 Flanders)	8
Canada Dance/Urban (RPM)	16
Europe (Eurochart Hot 100)	11
Israel (Israeli Singles Chart)	30
Netherlands (Dutch Top 40)	13
New Zealand (RIANZ)	19
Switzerland (Schweizer Hitparade)	22
UK Singles (OCC)	2
West Germany (Media Control)	23

Chart (1989)	Position
Australia (ARIA)	60

=== Certifications ===
Region	Certification	Certified units/sales
Australia (ARIA)	Gold	35,000^{^}
France (SNEP)	Silver	250,000^{*}
Sweden (GLF)	Gold	25,000^{^}
United Kingdom (BPI)	Gold	500,000^{^}
^{*} Sales figures based on certification alone.^{^} Shipments figures based on certification alone.

== See also ==
- Acid house
- House music
- Second Summer of Love
