= Stand Up for Your Love Rights =

- One of CD artwork variants, also used for UK limited vinyl gatefold edition

Single by Yazz

from the album Wanted
- B-side: "Remix"
- Released: 17 October 1988
- Genre: Acid house; dance-pop
- Length: 5:00 (album version); 4:21 (7-inch version)
- Label: Indisc; Blow Up; Big Life
- Songwriters: Yasmin Marie Evans; Timothy Parry
- Producer: The Beatmasters

Yazz singles chronology
"The Only Way Is Up" (1988)	"Stand Up for Your Love Rights" (1988)	"Fine Time" (1989)

Music video
- "Stand Up for Your Love Rights" on YouTube

"Stand Up for Your Love Rights" is a song performed by British pop singer Yazz. It is the follow-up single to her successful single "The Only Way Is Up" and was released in October 1988 by Indisc, Blow Up and Big Life as the second single from her debut album, Wanted (1988). The song is written by Yazz and Timothy Parry, and produced by The Beatmasters. It became a hit in several European countries, peaking at number one in both Finland and Ireland. Additionally, it was a top-10 hit in Belgium, Denmark, West Germany, Luxembourg, the Netherlands and Switzerland. Outside Europe, the song hit number five on the US Billboard Hot Dance Club Play chart, number eight in New Zealand and number 22 in Australia.

== Critical reception ==
Bill Coleman from Billboard magazine wrote, "Potential smash follow-up to 'The Only Way Is Up'. Inspirational vocals and rhythm track are enhanced in the fab new mixes. Don't miss the dub." Chris Heath from Smash Hits said, "This starts brilliantly: Yazz chants the song's title, a police siren wails, one of those '70s style orchestras starts up and it launches into an odd tinkly bit that resembles Mel & Kim's 'FLM'." He added, "After a while, however, the chorus lodges itself firmly in your brain, you start noticing how good her demented singing is near the end and you realise it will be a jolly big hit after all. Thank goodness for that."

== Music videos ==
Two different music videos were filmed to promote the single. The first video, airing in Europe and Australasia, consists mostly of scenes of Yazz singing and accompanied by instrument players (backing vocalists can be seen from time to time too) interspersed with scenes of people dancing and hugging each other. Behind the musicians is a large board with diagrams on it similar to those on the cover of the 12-inch remix single. The second video, which was filmed for the North American market, features scenes of Yazz performing on stage with a band, and footage showing her getting ready to go on stage. Filmed on location at Heaven night club the video was directed by Don Letts and James Hudson. The producer was Nick Verden for Radar Films. This was the same team who made the video for Fine Time.

== Formats and track listings ==
- 7-inch single
1. "Stand Up for Your Love Rights" — 4:21
2. "Stand Up for Your Love Rights" (what it is! mix) — 3:57
- 12-inch maxi
1. "Stand Up for Your Love Rights" (extended) — 7:15
2. "Stand Up for Your Love Rights" (y'azzid mix!) — 6:45
- CD maxi
1. "Stand Up for Your Love Rights" (7-inch version) — 4:22
2. "Stand Up for Your Love Rights" (y'azzid mix) — 6:45
3. "Stand Up for Your Love Rights" (extended 12-inch) — 7:15
- 12-inch maxi – Remixes
1. "Stand Up for Your Love Rights" (the stadium disco mix) — 8:50
2. "Stand Up for Your Love Rights" (she's crazy mix) — 7:38

== Charts ==
=== Weekly charts ===
Chart (1988–1989)	Peak position
Australia (ARIA)	22
Austria (Ö3 Austria Top 40)	29
Belgium (Ultratop 50 Flanders)	4
Finland (Suomen virallinen lista)	1
France (SNEP)	19
Greece (IFPI)	3
Ireland (IRMA)	1
Italy (Musica e dischi)	16
Italy Airplay (Music & Media)	5
Luxembourg (Radio Luxembourg)	3
Netherlands (Dutch Top 40)	7
Netherlands (Single Top 100)	6
New Zealand (Recorded Music NZ)	8
Sweden (Sverigetopplistan)	12
Switzerland (Schweizer Hitparade)	7
UK Singles (OCC)	2
US 12-inch Singles Sales (Billboard)	20
US Dance Club Play (Billboard)	5
West Germany (GfK)	10

=== Year-end charts ===
Chart (1988)	Position
Belgium (Ultratop)	41
Netherlands (Dutch Top 40)	81
Netherlands (Single Top 100)	82
UK Singles (OCC)	41

Chart (1989)	Position
West Germany (Media Control)	91

== Certifications ==
Country	Certification	Date	Sales certified
UK	Silver	1 December 1988	250,000
