= Peter Watson (musician) =

English Musician (born 1941)

Peter Watson (born 18 October 1941, Romford, Essex) was lead guitarist in the 1960s mod/soul band The Action.

== Career ==
Watson joined the band that would become The Action when they were still known as The Boys. He had been working as a guitar demonstrator in Sound City in Shaftsbury Avenue, when he was scouted by the other band members looking to fill out their line up with another guitarist.

Watson remained with the band until 1966, when he left over financial difficulties that Watson blamed on the band's then manager Rikki Farr. Watson was replaced as lead guitarist by Martin Stone. On leaving the band, Watson largely left the music industry, until rejoining The Action when they reformed in 1998 for a number of reunion gigs and tours in the subsequent six years.

== Guitar ==
Pete Watson played a Rickenbacker 12 string 1993 model. This was a special version of the famous Rickenbacker 360/12 model made for British distributor Rose Morris, also known to have been played by The Who's Pete Townshend. Watson claims to have played this guitar for The Action on every recording he was on.
