= Mighty Baby =

English band (1969–1971)

- Origin: London, England
- Genres: Psychedelic rock; folk rock; progressive rock; acid rock
- Years active: 1969–1971
- Labels: Head; Blue Horizon
- Spinoffs: Chilli Willi and the Red Hot Peppers
- Spinoff of: The Action
- Past members: Alan 'Bam' King; Martin Stone; Ian Whiteman; Mike 'Ace' Evans; Roger Powell
- Website: actionmightybaby.co.uk

Mighty Baby were an English band formed in January 1969 by former members of the Action. They released two albums, Mighty Baby (1969) and A Jug of Love (1971).

== History ==
Following the 1968 departure of singer Reg King from the Action, keyboardist Ian Whiteman (who had joined in 1967 and then left the following year due to Reg King's unpredictable behaviour) returned to the group, sharing vocal duties with Alan King. Signing a recording contract with Head Records, the band changed its name to Mighty Baby (at the suggestion of Head Records' head John Curd), making its live debut under this name at the Roundhouse in January 1969, supporting Fairport Convention.

Mighty Baby recorded its eponymous debut at Morgan Studios in Willesden over two days in March 1969, produced by Guy Stevens. The album, a collection of psychedelic rock songs, was released in November 1969 by Head Records in the UK, and on Chess in the US. Despite a low budget and the resultant low production values, Mighty Baby was critically lauded in the underground press; but Head Records was unable to effectively promote and distribute the album. In 2022, Mojo's Jim Irvin regarded Mighty Baby as "one of the great lost albums of the period; a facet of the shape-shifting, dawn-of-prog dynamic shared by contemporaries Traffic and Family; music rooted in R&B but revelling in the opportunity to go anywhere it likes".)

Between the recording of their two albums, the band supplemented their gigging income by playing a variety of recording sessions for others, including Robin Scott (Woman From the Warm Grass), Andy Roberts, Keith Christmas (Stimulus and Fable of the Wings), Shelagh McDonald, Sandy Denny, and Gary Farr (Take Something with You, Strange Fruit).

Mighty Baby was the closing act on the first day of the Isle of Wight Festival 1970.

Over the course of 1970 four of the five members of the band (Alan King being the exception) became Muslims, adherents of the Sufi order; their second album, A Jug of Love, released in October 1971, reflected the spiritual journey they had embarked on, sounding little like its predecessor; contemporary reviews were poor. In 2022, Mojo's Jim Irvin reviewed A Jug of Love thus: "a low-key masterpiece; six unhurried songs, a beautiful account of a band of musicians achieving long-searched-for musical concord; the closest, perhaps, that a British group has come to the transcendent togetherness of the Grateful Dead."

The band's breakup at the end of 1971 was gradually precipitated by irreconcilable differences between group members' Muslim faith and the demands associated with being a secular rock band.

== Post-breakup ==
In the years immediately following the band's breakup at the end of 1971, Martin Stone was a founding member of Chilli Willi and the Red Hot Peppers, Alan King was a founding member of Ace, and Roger Powell, Mike Evans and Ian Whiteman formed the Habibiyya.

Leslie Berman claims that it was a meeting between Richard Thompson and the band that introduced Richard and Linda Thompson to the Sufi order. However, Richard Thompson claims to have discovered Sufism independently: although he'd met and worked with members of Mighty Baby before their 1971 breakup, it wasn't until 1972 (after Mighty Baby had broken up) that Thompson encountered Ian Whiteman, Roger Powell and Mike Evans at the first Sufi meeting he attended—after which they did indeed provide further encouragement and fellowship.

Mike Evans died on 15 January 2010 in London. He was buried at Woodland Burial Park near Beaconsfield.

A live concert, recorded at Malvern Winter Gardens in 1970, was released on the Sunbeam label during early 2010. These are from tapes held by Ian Whiteman given to him after the concert. A hitherto unreleased recording from the Glastonbury Fayre 1971 has been included in this document. It has been retrieved from the Radio Geronimo archive.

Martin Stone died in 2016.

In 2019, the complete recordings of the band were released as At a Point Between Fate and Destiny: a six-CD boxed set, including their first album, with, as bonus tracks, a previously unissued alternate acetate version of the album; A Jug of Love, with as bonus tracks, the Blue Horizon single and the Action Speak Louder ... tracks; "A Jug of Love Rehearsals", which were previously issued on Slipstreams (Flashback, 2015) and, as bonus tracks, a 1969 jam and the French Philips single "Day of the Soup", a set of mainly instrumental demos for a "potential", unissued second album and, as bonus tracks, 1970 live recordings; Live at Malvern (same tracks as Tasting the Life – Live 1971); and Live at Glastonbury, a more complete, cassette recording by Radio Geronimo DJs of their 1971 Glastonbury set. A 40-page booklet with an extensive band history, based on contemporary documents and interviews with all members of the band, is included.

== Band members ==
- Alan 'Bam' King – vocals, guitar (born 18 September 1945, Muswell Hill, North London)
- Martin Stone – guitar (born 11 December 1946, Woking, Surrey)
- Ian Whiteman – piano, flute (born 18 May 1945, Saffron Walden, Essex)
- Mike 'Ace' Evans – bass guitar (born Michael Evans, 10 July 1945, Henley, Berkshire)
- Roger Powell – drums (born 4 July 1944, Camden Town, London)

== Discography ==
- Action Speak Louder Than ... (1968 recordings of the Action already in Mighty Baby line-up, released in 1985)
- Mighty Baby (album, Head Records, November 1969)
- "Egyptian Tomb" / "I'm from the Country" (single, Philips France, 1969)
- "Devil's Whisper" b/w "Virgin Spring" (single, Blue Horizon 2096-003, October 1971)
- A Jug of Love (album, Blue Horizon 2931-001, October 1971)
- Glastonbury Fayre - various artists: one song: "A Blanket in My Muesli" (Revelation 1/2/3, triple album, April 1972, live recordings from Glastonbury 1971)
- Live in the Attic (Rolled Gold Productions, December 2000)
- Tasting the Life – Live 1971 (double album, Sunbeam Records, 2010)
- At a Point Between Fate and Destiny – The Complete Recordings (Grapefruit Records, 2019)

With Reg King

- Reg King (album, United Artists Records 29157, 1971)
