= Yazz =

British singer (born 1960)

- Born: 19 May 1960 (age 66); Shepherd's Bush, London, England
- Genres: Dance; funk; rock; Christian
- Occupation: Singer
- Instruments: Vocals, guitar
- Years active: 1988–present
- Labels: Big Life; Polydor; eastwest; Elevation; Elektra Records

Yazz (born Yasmin Evans; 19 May 1960) is a British pop singer, who remains perhaps best known for her 1988 UK number one single "The Only Way Is Up". Some of her records are credited to Yazz and the Plastic Population.

== Career ==
Yazz was born in Shepherd's Bush, London, to a Jamaican father and a British mother. She attended Holland Park School, where she excelled at sports, including the 400 metres. She was also a member of the England under-19 volleyball team. Following a spell as a catwalk model, she scored a number of club hits after recording with the group the Biz in 1983. Her first commercial success came in early 1988, when she sang on Coldcut's "Doctorin' the House". She soon launched a solo career on Big Life records, a label set up by her husband Jazz Summers, releasing her debut solo single, "The Only Way Is Up", in the summer of 1988. It went on to spend five weeks at the top of the UK Singles Chart, eventually becoming the second-biggest-selling UK single of the year. Her follow-up "Stand Up for Your Love Rights" was another big hit (UK number 2), while her debut album Wanted (UK number 3) was certified double platinum in the UK in September 1989 for sales exceeding 600,000.

She had a fourth UK top-10 single in 1989 with "Fine Time", but has since recorded only sporadically. A second Big Life album, titled Revolution of Love, was scheduled for release in 1990 following the single "Treat Me Good" (peaking at number 20 in the UK). The album was shelved, however, when Yazz parted ways with the label.

Yazz signed with Polydor Records, and an album titled One True Woman was scheduled for release in May 1992 following the release of the title track, but was also cancelled. She returned to the Top 40 in 1993, performing with Aswad on the hit "How Long". Her second album, One on One was finally released in 1994, including some of the tracks recorded for the One True Woman album.

She continued to release singles throughout the 1990s, including a cover version of The Jackson 5's "Never Can Say Goodbye". In 1997, she released The Natural Life, an album of cover versions, after signing with East West Records. The album was released in Japan, Australia and some parts of Europe, but not in the UK.

During this period, Yazz began to reevaluate her career choices: she wanted to give up a lifestyle that included her failed marriage to Summers (their union had resulted in a daughter, Rio, born in April 1990), and her dependency on alcohol. After she had researched various religions, a friend who used to be her hairstylist suggested she try visiting her church. Soon, she decided to "turn her life over to Christ".

Her 2008 album Running Back to You, distributed in the UK by ICC Records, charted her spiritual journey and her new-found Christian faith. Yazz is now based in Spain, and is an active member of the Calahonda Baptist Church. She returned to Britain occasionally to promote this album, performing songs from it live interspersed with several anecdotes pertaining to her faith.

In August 2009, Yazz performed with a full band on stage for the first time in several years at a church in Southampton. In October 2010, she performed again with a band at Cathedral House in Huddersfield, home of the Huddersfield Christian Fellowship.

A three-CD remastered deluxe edition of the Wanted album, containing Yazz's 1990 single "Treat Me Good", B-sides and remixes, was released on Cherry Red Records on 25 November 2016.

== Discography ==
=== Albums ===
Year	Album	Peak chart positions						
Year	Album	UK	AUS	GER	NED	NZ	SWE	SWI
1988	Wanted	3	43	35	57	27	8	19
1989	The Wanted Remixes	53	—	—	—	—	—	—
1994	One on One	—	—	—	—	—	—	—
1997	The Natural Life	—	—	—	—	—	—	—
2001	At Her Very Best and All the Greatest Hits	166	—	—	—	—	—	—
2008	Running Back to You	—	—	—	—	—	—	—
2011	This Is Love	—	—	—	—	—	—	—
"—" denotes a release that did not chart or was not released in that territory.

=== Singles ===
Year	Single	Peak positions														Album
Year	Single	UK	AUS	AUT	BEL (FL)	FRA	GER	IRE	NED	NOR	NZ	SWE	SWI	US	US Dance	Album
1988	"Doctorin' the House" (Coldcut featuring Yazz & The Plastic Population)	6	45	—	40	—	11	16	20	—	33	—	4	—	3	What's That Noise? (by Coldcut)
1988	"The Only Way Is Up" (as Yazz & The Plastic Population)	1	2	5	1	4	3	1	1	5	1	1	2	96	2	Wanted
1988	"Stand Up for Your Love Rights"	2	22	29	4	19	10	1	6	—	8	12	7	—	5	Wanted
1989	"Fine Time"	9	60	—	28	31	32	4	42	—	18	—	25	—	—	Wanted
1989	"Where Has All the Love Gone"	16	83	—	—	—	40	30	86	—	—	—	—	—	—	Wanted
1990	"Yazz' Megamix" (France only)	—	—	—	—	—	—	—	—	—	—	—	—	—	—	Singles only
1990	"Treat Me Good"	20	100	—	—	—	55	—	48	—	—	—	28	—	7	Singles only
1992	"One True Woman"	60	—	—	—	—	—	—	—	—	—	—	—	—	–	Singles only
1993	"How Long" (with Aswad)	31	—	—	—	—	52	—	—	—	—	—	—	—	—	One on One
1994	"Have Mercy"	42	—	—	—	—	86	—	—	—	—	—	—	—	—	One on One
1994	"Everybody's Got to Learn Sometime"	56	—	—	—	—	—	—	—	—	—	—	—	—	—	One on One
1996	"Good Thing Going"	53	—	—	—	—	—	—	—	—	—	—	—	—	—	The Natural Life
1997	"Never Can Say Goodbye"	61	240	—	—	—	—	—	—	—	—	—	—	—	—	The Natural Life
1998	"Abandon Me"	78	—	—	—	—	—	—	—	—	—	—	—	—	—	Single only
"—" denotes a release that did not chart or was not released in that territory.
