= Ernest Mothle =

South African musician (1941–2011)

- Born: Ernest Mogotsi Mothle; 2 December 1942; Pretoria, South Africa
- Died: 2 May 2011 (aged 68); Pretoria, South Africa
- Occupations: Musician, composer

Ernest "Shololo" Mothle (2 December 1942 – 2 May 2011) was a South African jazz musician (performing on double bass, electric bass and vocals) and composer.

== Life and work ==
He attended St. Peter's College in Rosettenville, Johannesburg, listening to music happening all around him in the bustling township. After briefly dreaming of playing the clarinet or saxophone (taking up the latter in his teens due to fooling around), he discovered his voice in music after turning to double bass.

As a result, Mothle began playing with various musicians active in his home area of Tshwane. At college, he played in the Father Huddlestone Band with Hugh Masekela and Jonas Gwangwa. In 1959, he found the vocal group Dominoes along with Francis and Cornelius Kekana and Gabriel Tladi.

By 1962, Mothle had become an accomplished jazz musician, performing on Alf Herbert's African Jazz and Variety Show and with musicians and singers such as Barney Rachabane, Johnny Mekoa, Tete Mbambisa, Pat Matshikiza, Winston Mankunku Ngozi, Abigail Kubeka, Thandi Klaasen and Busi Mhlongo. In 1969, he was involved in the recording of the LP Armitage Road at Heshoo Beshoo Group with Henry Sithole.

Afterwards, Mothle went to the United Kingdom, joining other fellow exiled South African musicians. Whilst there, he performed in many bands ranging from Julian Bahula's Jabula to Jim Dvorak's Joy and from the late 1970s, ones belonging to Dudu Pukwana. He also recorded with Mike Oldfield (playing percussion on the album Ommadawn) and from 1981, was a member of Chris McGregor's Brotherhood of Breath. Other giants of the jazz world Mothle performed with included Courtney Pine, Sonny Stitt and Archie Shepp.

In 1982 he played double bass on the Scritti Politti album Songs to Remember.

Apartheid was a very serious matter to Mothle. As a result, he performed with the Jazz Gene Apartheid Project in Germany led by Makaya Ntshoko and John Tchicai. Another memorable event Mothle performed at was Nelson Mandela's 70th Birthday Concert at Wembley Stadium along with his friends Masekala and Gwanga.

In the world of film and TV, Mothle performed as part of the orchestra in horror comedy Haunted Honeymoon and as part of the jazz quartet (alongside his friend Pine) in the first episode of Doctor Who's 25th anniversary special Silver Nemesis. Along with Gwanga, he performed on the soundtrack to Richard Attenborough's 1987 film Cry Freedom.

Returning to South Africa in the 1990s, Mothle continued to perform with visiting musicians including Bob Mintzer, James Newton and René McLean. He also worked as a bass instructor at Mmabana Cultural Centre and taught music at the Tshwane University of Technology, as well as continuing to perform at gigs and concerts. He died of diabetes-related complications at his home in Mamelodi in early May 2011.

== Later years ==
The album that Mothle as part of Joy recorded in 1976 with James Dvorak, Frank Roberts, and Keith Bailey was finally re-released in 2023.

== Discography ==
- 1982: Songs to Remember, Scritti Politti
