= Scandal (Australian band) =

- Origin: Adelaide, South Australia, Australia
- Genres: Pop rock
- Years active: 1976–1979
- Labels: Mushroom/Festival Records
- Past members: Aldo Civitico; Chris Harriott; Stuart Kerrison; Michael Smith; Peter Watson; Nat De Palma; Adrian Dessent; Greg Trennery

Scandal were a short lived Australian pop rock band, which formed in February 1976 in Adelaide. The group released a self-titled studio album via Mushroom Records/Festival Records, which peaked at number 50 on the Australian charts in 1978. Members were Australian-born Aldo Civitico on drums and four English immigrants Chris Harriott on keyboards and vocals, Stuart Kerrison on lead vocals, Michael Smith on bass guitar and Peter Watson on lead guitar and vocals. They supported tours by 10cc and Electric Light Orchestra. The group broke up in December 1978 when Harriott, Kerrison and Watson left but the trio reformed Scandal in August of the following year with the addition of Nat De Palma on drums, Adrian Dessent on guitar and Greg Trennery on bass guitar. However they disbanded again.

== Discography ==
=== Albums ===
List of studio albums, with Australian positions
Title	Details	Peak chart positions
Title	Details	AUS
Scandal	Released: April 1978; Label: Mushroom Records (L 36570); Formats: Cassette, LP	50

=== Singles ===
List of singles, with Australian chart positions
Year	Title	Peak chart positions	Album
Year	Title	AUS	Album
1977	"Best Deal in Town "	57	Scandal
1977	"Harry"	73	Scandal
1978	"How Long"	45	Scandal
1978	"She's a Lady "		Scandal
