= Ace (band) =

English rock band featuring Paul Carrack (1972–1977)

- Also known as: Ace Flash and the Dynamos
- Origin: Sheffield, England
- Genres: Pub rock; pop rock; soft rock
- Years active: 1972–1977
- Labels: Anchor; ABC; Varèse Sarabande
- Spinoff of: Warm Dust
- Past members: Paul Carrack; Alan "Bam" King; Terry "Tex" Comer; Phil Harris; Steve Witherington; Fran Byrne; Jon Woodhead

Ace were an English rock band active from 1972 to 1977. Their biggest hit song was "How Long", a top 20 single in the United Kingdom in 1974, and top 3 hit in the United States and Canada in 1975.

Ace launched the career of vocalist Paul Carrack, who found greater fame in the 1980s with Mike + The Mechanics and as a solo artist.

== Career ==
The band formed in December 1972 in Sheffield as "Ace Flash and the Dynamos", but soon shortened the name to "Ace". The members were assembled from various professional bands. Carrack and Terry Comer had previously played with Warm Dust, and Alan "Bam" King with Mighty Baby and before that the 1960s band The Action. Fusing elements of pop and funk, Ace achieved popularity on the pub rock circuit.

Before the recording of their debut album, Five-A-Side, the former drummer of Bees Make Honey, Fran Byrne, replaced Steve Witherington. The single "How Long" was taken from this record, and was a significant chart success, achieving a top 20 place in the UK Singles Chart, and reaching number three in the US Billboard Hot 100 chart in the spring of 1975. The Five-A-Side album did well on its own too, peaking at number 11 on the Billboard 200. Carrack, the band's keyboardist and chief songwriter, sang lead on "How Long", while follow-up singles were sung by other band members.

Ace eventually moved to the United States, replacing Phil Harris with Jon Woodhead in June 1976, and releasing their third and final album No Strings in January 1977. Unlike earlier Ace LPs, the latter featured Carrack's vocals, with Carrack singing lead on the two singles issued from the album. The singles did not chart and Ace disbanded in July 1977, when Carrack, Comer and Byrne all joined Frankie Miller's backing band.

In addition to his solo career, Carrack has since played with Eric Clapton, Nick Lowe, Roger Waters and his The Bleeding Heart Band, Roxy Music for the Manifesto album and tour, Squeeze in the early 1980s, and Mike + The Mechanics, for which he is best known. His solo re-recording of "How Long" became a UK top 40 hit again in 1996.

== Personnel ==
- Paul Carrack (born 22 April 1951, Sheffield, Yorkshire) – keyboards, vocals (1972–1977)
- Alan "Bam" King (born 18 September 1946, Kentish Town, London) – rhythm guitar, vocals (1972–1977)
- Terry "Tex" Comer (born 23 February 1949, Burnley, Lancashire) – bass (1972–1977)
- Phil Harris (born Philip Harris, 18 July 1948, Muswell Hill, London) – lead guitar, vocals (1972–1976)
- Steve Witherington (born 26 December 1953, Enfield, Middlesex) – drums (1972–1974)
- Fran Byrne (born 17 March 1948, Dublin, Ireland) – drums (1974–1977)
- Jon Woodhead – lead guitar, vocals (1976–1977)

== Discography ==
=== Studio albums ===
Year	Album	Peak chart positions		Record label
Year	Album	US	CAN	Record label
1974	Five-A-Side	11	16	Anchor Records
1975	Time for Another	153	—	Anchor Records
1977	No Strings	170	—	Anchor Records
"—" denotes releases that did not chart.

=== Compilation albums ===
- Six-A-Side (1982)
- How Long: The Best of Ace (1987)
- The Very Best of Ace (1993)
- The Best of Ace (Varèse, 2003)

=== Singles ===
Year	Title	Peak chart positions				Record label	B-side	Album
Year	Title	US	US AC	CAN	UK	Record label	B-side	Album
1974	"How Long"	3	24	3	20	Anchor Records	"Sniffin' About"	Five-A-Side
1975	"Rock & Roll Runaway"	71	—	—	—	Anchor Records	"I Ain't Gonna Stand for This No More" (A-side)	Five-A-Side
1975	"I Ain't Gonna Stand for This No More"	—	—	—	51	Anchor Records	"Rock & Roll Runaway"	Time for Another
1975	"No Future in Your Eyes"	—	—	—	—	Anchor Records	"I'm a Man"	Time for Another
1977	"You're All That I Need"	—	—	—	—	Anchor Records	"Crazy World"	No Strings
1977	"Found Out the Hard Way"	—	—	—	—	Anchor Records	"Why Did You Leave Me"	No Strings
"—" denotes releases that did not chart or were not released in that territory.

== See also ==
- List of 1970s one-hit wonders in the United States
