= Wanted (Yazz album) =

Studio album by Yazz
- Released: 14 November 1988 (UK)
- Recorded: February–June 1988
- Genres: Pop; dance
- Label: Big Life
- Producers: Coldcut; Mark Brydon; Robert Gordon; The Beatmasters; Youth

Yazz chronology
Wanted (1988)	The Wanted Remixes (1989)

Singles from Wanted
- 1. "The Only Way Is Up" Released: 11 July 1988; 2. "Stand Up for Your Love Rights" Released: 17 October 1988; 3. "Fine Time" Released: 23 January 1989; 4. "Where Has All the Love Gone" Released: 17 April 1989

Professional ratings
Review scores
Source	Rating
Record Mirror	4/5 stars

Wanted is the debut album by British pop singer Yazz, released on 14 November 1988 by Big Life Records. It contains the single "The Only Way Is Up", which reached number one in six countries. Wanted was certified double platinum in the UK in September 1989, for sales exceeding 600,000 copies.

A three-CD remastered deluxe edition, containing the original album plus B-sides, remixes and Yazz's 1990 non-album single "Treat Me Good", was released on Cherry Red Records on 25 November 2016.

== Singles ==
"The Only Way Is Up" was the first single to be released from the album, reaching number one in the UK Singles Chart. Three further singles were released from the album: "Stand Up for Your Love Rights", "Fine Time" and "Where Has All the Love Gone?".

== Critical reception ==
Bill Coleman from Billboard wrote, "Every once in a while an album that you had absolutely no expectations for makes you pull your foot out of your mouth. Case in point: Wanted (Elektra), the debut by U.K. soloist Yasmin Evans, aka Yazz, is chock full of unexpected delights. The annoyingly catchy, international disco/pop smash "The Only Way Is Up" and the similarly styled forthcoming "Stand Up for Your Love Rights" are by no means indicative of the album's depth."

== Track listing ==
No.	Title	Writer(s)	Length
1.	"The Only Way Is Up"	George Jackson; Johnny Henderson	4:26
2.	"Where Has All the Love Gone"	Yazz	4:30
3.	"Got to Share"	Yazz; Youth; Mike Smith	4:58
4.	"Fine Time"	Youth; Andy Caine; Jake Le Mesurier	4:42
5.	"Stand Up for Your Love Rights"	Yazz; Tim Parry	5:00
6.	"Wanted on the Floor"	Yazz; Youth; Caine	4:57
7.	"Something Special"	Yazz; Ruth Joy; Robert Gordon; Mark Brydon	5:04
8.	"Systematic People"	Yazz; Andy Davis	3:26
9.	"Turn It Up"	Yazz; Gordon; Brydon	4:23

CD bonus tracks
No.	Title	Writer(s)	Length
10.	"The Only Way Is Up" (12" Version)	Jackson; Henderson	6:45
11.	"Stand Up for Your Love Rights" (12" Version)	Yazz; Parry	7:15

== Personnel ==
Adapted from the album's liner notes.

=== Musicians ===
- Yazz – lead vocals (all tracks), backing vocals (tracks 2, 4, 8), keyboards (track 2)
- Gary Barnacle – soprano saxophone (track 4)
- Matt Black – scratching (track 6)
- Dee Boyle – drums (track 7)
- Andy Caine – backing vocals (tracks 1, 4–6, 10), guitar (track 6)
- Mary Cassidy – backing vocals (tracks 7, 9)
- James Gardner – additional keyboards (track 4)
- Derek Green – backing vocals (tracks 7, 9)
- Lisa 'J' – backing vocals (tracks 1, 5, 10, 11)
- Joe Legwabe – backing vocals (track 3)
- Sonti Mndebele – backing vocals (track 3)
- Elliott Ngubane – backing vocals (track 3)
- Cathy Ogden – backing vocals (tracks 1, 5, 6, 10, 11)
- Jon Quarmby – keyboards (track 7)
- Richie Rich – scratching (track 6)
- Maggie Ryder – backing vocals (tracks 7, 9)
- Kevin Robinson – trumpet (track 3)
- Ruthjoy – backing vocals (tracks 2, 7)
- Linda Taylor – backing vocals (tracks 1, 5, 6, 10, 11)
- Princess Futi Zulu – backing vocals (track 3)

=== Technical ===
- Beatmasters – producer (tracks 5, 11)
- Craig Bevan – engineer (track 6)
- Paul Borg – engineer (track 3), mix engineer (tracks 5, 11)
- Jerry Boys – engineer (track 2)
- Mark Brydon – producer (tracks 2, 7–9), additional production (track 6)
- Arun Chakraverty – mastering (all tracks)
- Barry Clempson – engineer (tracks 4, 7, 9)
- Coldcut – producer (tracks 1, 10)
- Robert Gordon – producer (tracks 2, 7–9), additional production (track 6)
- Howard Gray – mixer (tracks 3, 4)
- Tony Harris – mix engineer (tracks 3, 4)
- Felix Kendall – mix engineer (tracks 1, 10)
- George Shilling – engineer (tracks 1, 2, 4, 5, 7, 10, 11), mix engineer (tracks 6, 8, 9)
- Mark Stent – engineer (tracks 5, 11)
- Youth – producer (tracks 3, 4, 6)
- Recorded at Livingston Studios, London, England (tracks 1, 3–7, 10); Fon Studios, Sheffield, England (tracks 2, 6–9)
- Mixed at Livingston (tracks 1–11)
- Eddie Monsoon – front photo
- Kevin Davies – inner photo
- Assorted Images – design

== Charts ==
Chart performance for Wanted
Chart (1988–1989)	Peak position
Australian Albums (ARIA)	43
Dutch Albums (Album Top 100)	57
German Albums (Offizielle Top 100)	35
New Zealand Albums (RMNZ)	27
Swedish Albums (Sverigetopplistan)	8
Swiss Albums (Schweizer Hitparade)	19
UK Albums (OCC)	3

== Certifications ==
Region	Certification	Certified units/sales
United Kingdom (BPI)	2× Platinum	600,000^{^}
^{^} Shipments figures based on certification alone.
