= Martin Stone (guitarist) =

British musician (1946–2016)

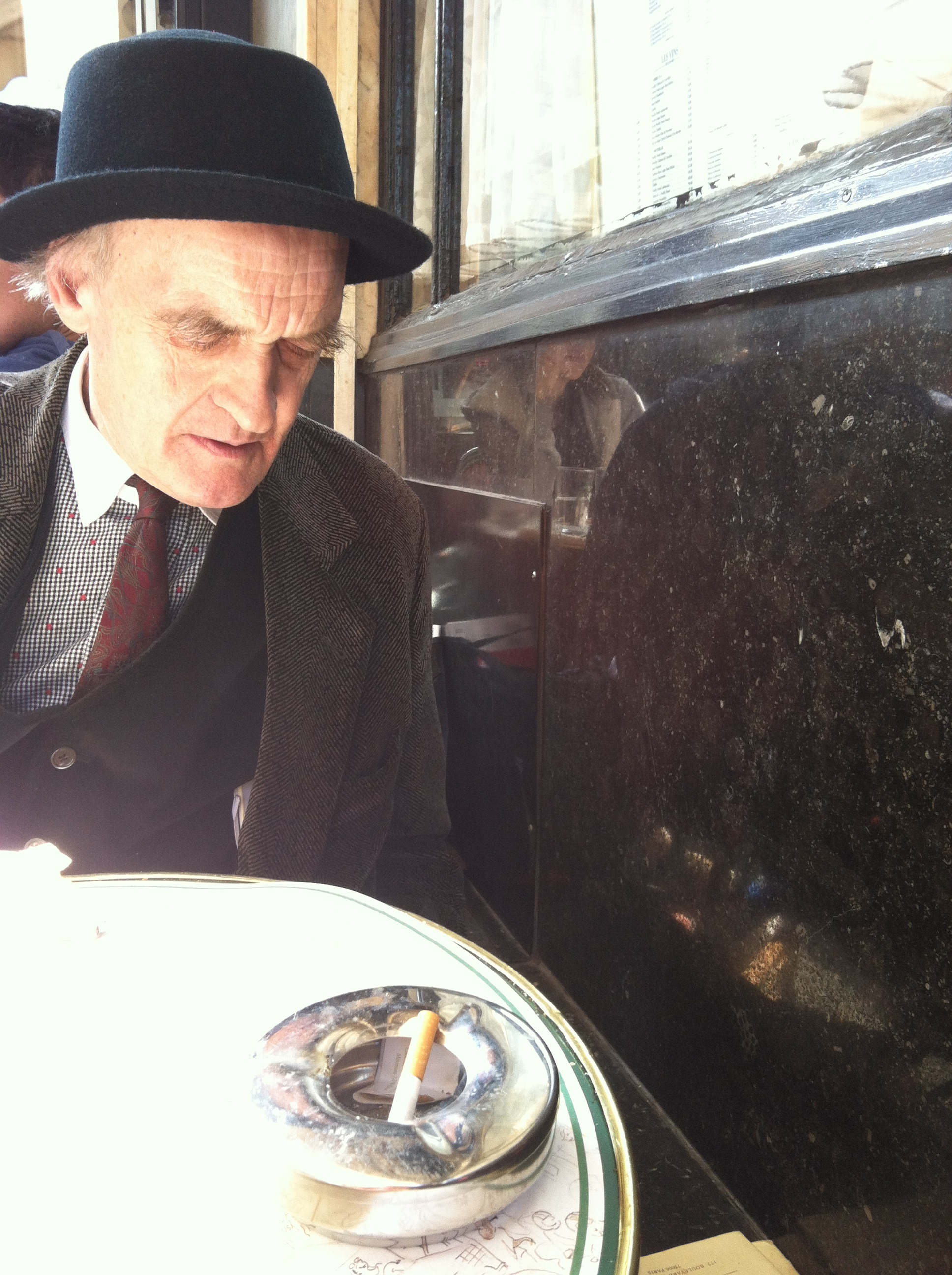
- Martin Stone in 2011
- Born: 11 December 1946; Woking, Surrey, England
- Died: 9 November 2016 (aged 69); Versailles, France
- Occupations: Guitarist; book dealer
- Years active: 1981–2016
- Spouse: Ruth Bullock (m. 1980)
- Children: Sophie Leigh Stone (daughter)

Martin Stone (11 December 1946 – 9 November 2016) was an English guitarist and rare book dealer. He was a longtime resident of London and for a while lived in Fingest in Buckinghamshire and, latterly, Montparnasse, Paris, before moving to Versailles.

== Musical career ==
Stone was a few years younger than his later musical partner Michael Moorcock but grew up in the same part of South London, knew the same book and music-shops and had the same enthusiasms. The first time both met was on stage when Stone was in Mighty Baby and Moorcock was with Hawkwind. They became close friends. With Chilli Willi he made Kings of the Robot Rhythm and Bongos Over Balham,. His last album, which he called his legacy album, was Live From the Terminal Café, with Michael Moorcock and the Deep Fix (Cleopatra Records, Autumn 2019). Educated at Whitgift School, he initially wanted to be a journalist and began as a cub reporter on The Croydon Advertiser, interviewing Jimmy Page when he was still a session musician. Stone's passion for the guitar led him to become a musician. He was given consideration as a possible replacement for Brian Jones in the Rolling Stones. He is said not to have turned up for the audition. He was known as 'a guitarist's guitarist' and had a legendary reputation as a literary book dealer. He had many friends in both worlds.

Stone played in many groups, including Junior's Blues Band, Stone's Masonry, Almost Presley, The Action, Savoy Brown Blues Band, Mighty Baby, Chilli Willi and the Red Hot Peppers, Les Soucoupes violentes, Southern Comfort, Pink Fairies, The 101ers, Wreckless Eric, and the Gibson Girls. Stone also played live with French chanteuse Anne Pigalle for a couple of years, including at the Glastonbury Festival in 2005 for a second time.

He continued to play, backing Marianne Faithfull in her live performances, lead guitar in the French band Almost Presley and others.

== Book runner ==
By the 1980s, Stone was earning much of his living as a bookseller, with an almost uncanny knack for finding 'lost' or famous books. He was a great fan of the writer M. P. Shiel, who first inspired his passion for book collecting and later book-selling, achieving an international reputation as a bookrunner. His personal collection of 19th-20th century French poetry was acquired in 2019 by Cambridge University Library. He was a major player in John Baxter's memoir A Pound of Paper: Confessions of a Book Addict. He was the subject of a limited edition photographic book Martin Stone, Bookscout by the California rare bookseller Peter Howard of Serendipity Books. He appeared in the television documentary Without Walls: The Cardinal And The Corpse (Iain Sinclair / Chris Petit 1992). He was also known to be the basis for the character Nicholas Lane in Sinclair's novel White Chappell, Scarlett Tracings (1987).

== Personal life ==
Stone was married in 1980 to Ruth Bullock and their daughter is the actress Sophie Leigh Stone.
