= Scene Club =

London music venue

Coordinates: 51.5111°N 0.1342°W

The Scene Club was a 1960s music venue in Ham Yard, 41 Great Windmill Street, Soho, central London, England. The club opened in 1963 and was associated with the mod youth subculture.

Bands that appeared at the club included the Rolling Stones and The Who.
