= Jim Dvorak =

American jazz trumpeter

- Birth name: James Peter Dvorak
- Born: December 16, 1948 (age 76); New York City, United States
- Genres: Jazz, jazz rock
- Occupation: Musician
- Instrument: Trumpet
- Years active: c 1970 - present
- Labels: Some Records, Slam Productions, 577 Records
- Formerly of: Jim Dvorak Quintet, Joy, In Cahoots, Research, Dreamtime, District Six, Bardo State Orchestra, Mama Quartetto, The Dedication Orchestra, London Improvisers Orchestra, Dean-Trovesi Double Quartet, Organon, Little Princess Orchestra, Keith Tippett Tapestry Orchestra, Lullula

James Peter Dvorak (born December 16, 1948, New York City) is an American jazz trumpeter.

== Background ==
Dvorak received his bachelor's degree from the Eastman School of Music in 1970 and then relocated to England, where he lived for several decades. In the early 1970s he worked with Keith Tippett for the first time; the pair worked together again in the 1980s and 1990s. He played with Brotherhood of Breath from 1970 to 1975 and with a group called Joy around the same time, and played with Louis Moholo in the middle of the decade. He led his own groups from 1977 to 1982, first Sum Sum (with Elton Dean, Alan Skidmore, and Nick Evans), then Dhyana. In the 1980s he worked with Dudu Pukwana, Brian Abrahams, Keith Tippett, Maggie Nicols, and Ruthie Smith. In 1989 he joined the group In Cahoots, playing with them through most of the 1990s, and also worked with The Dedication Orchestra and with Marcio Mattos and Ken Hyder. He was a member of Mujician, again alongside Tippett, from the late 1990s.

== Career ==
=== 1970s to 1980s ===
According to the 10 November 1973 issue of Melody Maker, the Jim Dvorak Quintet was appearing at the Black Horse in Rathbone Place off Oxford Street on the Friday.

Dvorak's group District Six had released the To Be Free album on Editions 53. It was reviewed by Bill Milkowski in the April, 1988 issue of Down Beat. He referred to it as a "highly eclectic offering, a kind of hodgepodge". He gave it three and a half stars. It was also reported that year by Music & Media in the magazine's 22 October 1988 issue that Dvorak's s African jazz group District Six were working with Metronome artist Annabel Lamb on her Justice album.

=== 1990s to 2000s ===
The self-titled album that Dvorak and his bandmates recorded in 1976 as members of the group Joy was finally re-released in 2023. It was well received.
