= Sandra Barry =

English actress and singer (born 1943)

Sandra Barry (née Alfred; born 1943) is an English actress, singer and record producer. During her career, she has performed and recorded as Sandra Alfred, Mandy Mason, Sandra Barry and Alice Spring.

== Acting career (as Sandra Alfred) ==
Sandra Alfred debuted as an actress on film in an uncredited role in The Belles of St Trinian's (1954). She went on to small roles in other British films and television shows. As Sandra Alfred, she latched on to the early British rock and roll scene and recorded "Rocket and Roll b/w Six Day Rock" for Oriole Records, released in December 1957.

== 1960s music career (as Sandra Barry) ==
As Mandy Mason, she released "A Tear in the Eye", written and produced by Barry Mason (no relation), on the Parlophone label in 1963, before she took on the stage name Sandra Barry and was signed to Decca Records. She was backed by guitar band The Boys (who would later go on to become cult mod band The Action), sometimes credited as Sandra Barry and The Boyfriends. Backed by The Boys, Barry released the single "Really Gonna Shake" in 1964. She subsequently signed with Pye Records, and released a number of singles backed by Jet Harris' backing band The Jet Blacks, who included future Led Zeppelin bassist John Paul Jones, but failed to score any hits.

== 1970s career (as Alice Spring) ==
In 1973, she re-emerged as Alice Spring, fronting the short-lived pub rock act Slack Alice. Later in the decade, she fronted post punk band Darling, who released an album and a number of singles in 1979. After Darling folded in the early 1980s, she produced bands together with Slack Alice and Darling bassist Mick Howard.
