= List of Savile Club members =

The Savile Club is a gentlemen's club in Mayfair, London, founded in 1868. From its earliest years the club drew a deliberately varied membership, with particular strength in literature, the arts, music and science; some 200 Fellows of the Royal Society were members between 1868 and 1923 alone. Members are known as Savilians.

Following are some the notable members of the Savile Club, drawn from the index to Garrett Anderson's history of the club and from the club's membership records. Dates are the year elected to the Savile Club.

== Academia ==
Name	Year	Notability	Ref.
John George Adami		Vice-chancellor of the University of Liverpool, professor of pathology in McGill University, head of the pathological department of the Royal Victoria Hospital, Montreal	
Frank Adcock		Professor of Ancient History at the University of Cambridge	
Richard Adrian, 2nd Baron Adrian		Master of Pembroke College, Cambridge; fellow of Corpus Christi College, Cambridge and Churchill College, Cambridge; professor of cell physiology at the University of Cambridge	
Sidney Ball	1896	Fellow of St John's College, Oxford	
Frederick Banting	1932, honorary	Best Chair of Medical Research at the University of Toronto, recipient of the Nobel Prize in Physiology or Medicine	
Percy Barnett		Superintendent of Education for the Colony of Natal and Chief Inspector of Training of Teachers in England	
Frank Evers Beddard		Examiner in zoology and comparative anatomy at the University of London, lecturer in morphology at Oxford University, winner of the Linnean Medal	
Vernon H. Blackman		Director of biological sciences and head of botany at Imperial College of Science and Technology	
Alfred Gibbs Bourne		Director of the Indian Institute of Science, registrar and superintendent of the Government Museum, and professor of biology at Presidency College, Chennai	
Gilbert Charles Bourne		Fellow of Merton College, Oxford and Linacre Professor of Comparative Anatomy at the University of Oxford	
Frederick Orpen Bower		Chair and professor in botany at the University of Glasgow	
C. V. Boys		Physicist, assistant professor at the Royal College of Science, and examiner at the University of London.	
A. C. Bradley	1886	Professor of Poetry at the University of Oxford	
C. D. Broad	1921	Lecturer in 'moral science at Cambridge University's Faculty of Philosophy	
George Charles Brodrick	1868	Warden of Merton College, Oxford; historian	
Alexander Crum Brown		Professor of chemistry at the University of Edinburgh	
Gerard Baldwin Brown		Watson Gordon Chair of Fine Art at the University of Edinburgh	
E. A. Wallis Budge	1891	Egyptologist, Orientalist, and philologist with the British Museum	
Ingram Bywater	1869	Fellow of Exeter College, Oxford; Regius Professor of Greek of Christ Church, Oxford	
Edward Provan Cathcart		Professor of physiological chemistry at the University of Glasgow	
Allan Graham Ritchie Calder		British mathematician who specialised in algebraic topology and the philosophy of mathematics	
James Chadwick		Professor of physics at the University of Liverpool,received the Nobel Prize in Physics in 1935 for his discovery of the neutron	
Thomas Edward Cliffe Leslie	1869	Professor of jurisprudence and political economy in Queen's College, Belfast	
William Kingdon Clifford	1869	Professor of mathematics and mechanics at University College London	
John Cockcroft		First master of Churchill College, Cambridge; chancellor of the Australian National University; director of the Atomic Energy Research Establishment; shared the 1951 Nobel Prize in Physics	
Sidney Colvin	1869	Slade Professor of Fine Art at Trinity College, Cambridge and director of the Fitzwilliam Museum	
Bernard Crick		Professor of political theory at University of Sheffield and founder of the Department of Politics at Birkbeck, University of London	
Heinrich Debus	1868	Professor of chemistry in at the Royal Naval College, Greenwich	
Arthur Dendy		Professor of zoology at King's College London	
James Johnston Dobbie		Head of chemistry at Bangor University	
Wyndham Dunstan		Professor of chemistry and director of the Imperial Institute	
Francis Ysidro Edgeworth	1871	Chair in economics at King's College London, Drummond Professor of Political Economy at Oxford University, and founding editor of The Economic Journal	
John Bretland Farmer		Governor of The John Roan School and professor of botany at Imperial College London	
John Ferguson		Regius Professor of Chemistry at the University of Glasgow	
Niall Ferguson		Milbank Family Senior Fellow at the Hoover Institution and a senior fellow at the Belfer Center for Science and International Affairs at Harvard University	
M. R. D. Foot		Professor of modern history at Manchester University	
Martin Onslow Forster		Chemist and director of the Indian Institute of Science	
Gregory Foster		Provost of University College London and vice-chancellor of the University of London	
Michael Foster	1868	Professor of practical physiology at University College London; chair of physiology at Trinity College, Cambridge; helped to organize the University of Cambridge Biological School	
Herbert Foxwell		Dean of the Faculty of Economics at the University of London	
Percy F. Frankland		Professor of chemistry at the University of Dundee and Mason Science College	
Walter Gardiner		Fellow and botany lecturer at Clare College, Cambridge	
Walter Garstang		Professor of zoology at the University of Leeds	
Edmund Johnston Garwood		Yates-Goldsmid Professor of geology and mineralogy at London University	
W. H. Gaskell		Physiologist at the physiological laboratory of the University of Cambridge	
Arnold Goodman, Baron Goodman	1958	Master of University College, Oxford	
T. H. Green	1868	Whyte's Professor of Moral Philosophy at Balliol College, Oxford	
Joseph Gouge Greenwood	1868	Second principal of Owens College, Manchester and vice-chancellor of the Victoria University, Manchester	
H. J. C. Grierson		Knight Professor of English literature at the University of Edinburgh	
David Thomas Gwynne-Vaughan		Head of the Botany Department at Birkbeck College and Reading University	
Alfred Daniel Hall		Agricultural educator and ounder of Wye College	
Basil Hammond		Historian and fellow of Trinity College, Cambridge	
Walter Noel Hartley		Chemistry professor at the Royal College of Science for Ireland	
Philip Hartog		Vice-chancellor.of the University of Dhaka and academic registrar of the University of London	
Gavin Henderson		Principal of Trinity College of Music and the Royal Central School of Speech and Drama	
Peter Hennessy		Attlee professor of contemporary British History at Queen Mary University of London	
William Abbott Herdman		Demonstrator of zoology at the University of Edinburgh and derby chair of natural history at Liverpool University College	
Dawes Hicks		Professor of moral philosophy at University College London	
Cyril N. Hinshelwood	1922	Dr Lee's Professor at the University of Oxford and recipient of the 1956 Nobel Prize in chemistry	
Micaiah John Muller Hill		Professor of pure mathematics at University College London	
Shadworth Hodgson	1869	Philosopher and first president of the Aristotelian Society	
David George Hogarth		Orientalist archaeologist; fellow of Magdalen College, Oxford; and keeper of the Ashmolean Museum, Oxford	
Frederick Gowland Hopkins	1918	Chair of biochemistry at the University of Cambridge; recipient of the 1929 Nobel Prize in Physiology or Medicine	
William Jack	1868	Professor of mathematics at the University of Glasgow; editor of the Glasgow Herald	
M. R. James	1889	Medievalist scholar; provost of King's College, Cambridge and Eton College; and vice-chancellor of the University of Cambridge	
Fleeming Jenkin	1869	Regius Professor of Engineering at the University of Edinburgh; inventor of the cable car or telpherage	
Frederick Keeble		Sherardian Professor of Botany at the University of Oxford and Fullerian Professor of Physiology at the Royal Institution	
W. P. Ker		Professor of English literature and history at the University College of South Wales, Quain Professor at University College London, and lProfessor of Poetry at the University of Oxford	
Frank Kermode		Lord Northcliffe Professor of Modern English Literature at University College London and the King Edward VII Professor of English Literature at Cambridge University; literary critic	
William Henry Lang		Professor of cryptogamic botany at the University of Manchester	
John Newport Langley		Professor of physiology at the University of Cambridge	
Ray Lankester	1869	Invertebrate zoologist and evolutionary biologist who held chairs at University College London and Oxford University; director of the Natural History Museum, London	
Henry Lee-Warner	1868	Aassistant master in Rugby School, fellow of St John's College, Cambridge	
Thomas Martin Lindsay		Professor and principal of the Free Church College, Glasgow	
Archibald Liversidge		Dean of the Faculty of Science and professor of geology, chemistry and mineralogy at the University of Sydney	
Norman Lockyer	1868	Professor of astronomical physics at the Royal College of Science; co-discoverer of the gas helium; and founder and first editor of Nature	
Ernest MacBride		Marine biologist and professor of zoology at McGill University and Imperial College London	
John William Mackail	1883	Oxford Professor of Poetry and assistant secretary of the Education Department of the Privy Council	
Percy Alexander MacMahon		Mathematician; president of the London Mathematical Society	
John Pentland Mahaffy	1871	Provost of Trinity College Dublin	
Francis Marshall		Physiologist, fellow of Christ's College, and lecturer at University of Edinburgh and University of Cambridge	
Sidney Martin		Professor of pathology att University College London and professor of clinical medicine at University College Hospital	
Brander Matthews		Professor of dramatic literature at Columbia University	
James Mavor	1869	Professor of political economy of the University of Toronto	
William McCormick		Secretary of the Carnegie Trust and was a professor at University College, Dundee	
J. M. E. McTaggart	1894	Fellow and lecturer in philosophy at Trinity College	
Henry Alexander Miers		Professor of crystallography and vice chancellor at the Victoria University of Manchester	
Edward Alfred Minchin		Chair of zoology at University College London and chair of protozoology at the University of London	
William Mollison		Mathematician and Master of Clare College, Cambridge	
Theodore Morison		Principal of Muhammadan Anglo-Oriental College and Armstrong College; vice-chancellor of Durham University; and member of the Council of India	
Edward W. Morley		Professor of chemistry at Western Reserve College and Cleveland Medical College	
Robert Alexander Neil	1877	Senior tutor and lecturer in Sanskrit at Pembroke College, Cambridge	
Walther Nernst	1912	Professor of chemistry at the University of Göttingen; recipient of the 1920 Nobel Prize in Chemistry	
Francis Wall Oliver		Professor of botany at University College London	
William Peterson		Principal of McGill University	
Walter Alison Phillips		Lecky chair of History in Trinity College Dublin	
William Jackson Pope		Chair of chemistry at the Manchester Municipal School of Technology	
Edward Bagnall Poulton		Hope Professor of Zoology at the University of Oxford	
Reginald Punnett		Professor of biology and the first Arthur Balfour Professor of Genetics at the University of Cambridge; co-founder of the Journal of Genetics and creator of the Punnett square	
Thomas Purdie		Professor of Cchemistry at St Andrews University	
Philip Pye-Smith	1863	Vice-chancellor of the University of London; physician and medical scientist	
Thomas Raleigh		Vice-chancellor of the University of Calcutta, chair of the Indian Universities Commission, and fellow of All Souls College, Oxford	
Robert Heron Rastall		Geologist, lecturer at the University of Cambridge, and co-editor-in-chief of Geological Magazine	
Henry Reichel		Founder and vice-chancellor of the University of Wales; first principal of the University College of North Wales	
George Croom Robertson	1871	Professor of philosophy of mind and logic at University College, London	
Ernest Rutherford		Director of the Cavendish Laboratory at the University of Cambridge; recipient of the1908 Nobel Prize in Chemistry	
George Saintsbury	1874	Professor of rhetoric and English literature at the University of Edinburgh; literary critic for the Saturday Review	
Arthur Schuster	1879	Beyer Chair of Applied Mathematics at University of Manchester	
Adam Sedgwick		Professor of zoology and comparative anatomy at Imperial College London and chairman of the Geological Survey of Great Britain	
Charles Gabriel Seligman		Physician, ethnologist, and professor at the London School of Economics	
Napier Shaw		Assistance director of the Cavendish Laboratory; professor of meteorology at Imperial College, London	
Charles Scott Sherrington		Holt Professor of physiology at the University of Liverpool; Waynflete Chair of Physiology at Magdalen College, Oxford; superintendent of the Brown Institute for Advanced Physiological and Pathological Research of the University of London; co-recipient of the 1932 Nobel Prize in Physiology or Medicine	
Arthur Shipley		Vice-Chancellor of the University of Cambridge; Master of Christ's College, Cambridge	
Arthur Sidgwick	1868	Fellow of Corpus Christi College, Oxford and Trinity College, Cambridge	
Henry Sidgwick	1868	Knightbridge Professor of Moral Philosophy at the University of Cambridge	
Henry Simson		Co-founder of the Royal College of Obstetricians and Gynaecologists	
William Robertson Smith	1875	Chair in Hebrew at the Aberdeen Free Church College, minister of the Free Church of Scotland, and editor of the Encyclopædia Britannica	
Balfour Stewart	1863	Langworthy chair of physics at Owens College; director of Kew Observatory	
John Alexander Stewart		Philosopher; professor and classical lecturer at Christ Church, Oxford	
John William Strutt, 3rd Baron Rayleigh		Chancellor of the University of Cambridge and recipient of the 1904 Nobel Prize in Physics	
James Sully	1875	Grote Professor of the Philosophy of Mind and Logic at University College London	
Arthur Tansley		Sherardian Professor of Botany at the University of Oxford; pioneer in the science of ecology	
Charles Sanford Terry	1914	Burnett-Fletcher Professor of History and Archaeology at the University of Aberdeen	
D'Arcy Wentworth Thompson		Professor of natural history at University College, Dundee; pioneer of mathematical and theoretical biology	
J. J. Thomson	1883	Cavendish Professor of Physics at the University of Cambridge; recipient of the 1906 Nobel Prize in Physics	
John Millar Thomson		Chemist and vice-principal of King's College London	
William Thomson, 1st Baron Kelvin		Mathematician, professor of Natural Philosophy at the University of Glasgow	
Richard Threlfall		Chemist and engineer who established the School of Physics at the University of Sydney	
Hugh Trevor-Roper		Regius Professor of Modern History at the University of Oxford	
John Tyndall		Professor of physics at the Royal Institution of Great Britain known for his study of diamagnetism	
William Unwin		Chair of hydraulic and mechanical engineering at the Royal Indian Engineering College	
John Venn	1869	Mathematician, logician and philosopher noted for introducing Venn diagrams	
Augustus Desiré Waller		Fullerian Professor of Physiology at the Royal Institution, London	
James Ward	1880	Chair of mental philosophy and logic at Trinity College, Cambridge	
William Watson		Professor of physics at the Royal College of Science	
Alfred North Whitehead	1911	Professor of applied mathematics at Imperial College London, dean of the Faculty of Science at the University of London	
Spenser Wilkinson	1905	Chichele Professor of Military History at Oxford University	
Alexander William Williamson	1868	Professor and chair of general chemistry at the University College, London	
George MacKinnon Wrong		Professor and head of the Department of History at the University of Toronto	

== Art and architecture ==
Name	Year	Notability	Ref.
Michael Ayrton		Painter, printmaker, sculptor, and writer	
Eustace Balfour	1876	Architect	
Max Beerbohm	1899	Caricaturist, essayist, and parodist	
Oswald Birley		Portrait artist	
John Brett	1868	Painter	
Henry Harris Brown		Portrait artist	
Basil Champneys	1869	Architect	
George Vicat Cole	1868	Painter	
Lionel Cust		Art historian and director of the National Portrait Gallery	
Frederick Thomas Dalton		Caricaturist for Vanity Fair	
Henry William Banks Davis	1868	Painter of landscapes and animals	
George Frampton	1898	Sculptor and leading member of the New Sculpture movement	
Vaughan Grylls		Artist, photographer, director of Kent Institute of Art & Design, and co-founder of the University College for the Creative Arts at Canterbury, Epsom, Farnham, Maidstone & Rochester	
Cecil Harcourt-Smith		Keeper of Greek and Roman Antiquities at the British Museum and director of the Victoria and Albert Museum	
George Percy Jacomb-Hood	1892	Painter, etcher, and illustrator	
John Lockwood Kipling		Illustrator, museum curator, and art teacher	
David Low		Political cartoonist and caricaturist	
Paul Oppé	1904	Deputy director of the Victoria and Albert Museum	
William Orpen	1909	Draughtsman and portrait painter; war artist during World War I	
John Charles Robinson		Painter, etcher, and curator of the Museum of Ornamental Art at Marlborough House and South Kensington Museum	
William Rothenstein	1908	Painter, printmaker, and principal at the Royal College of Art	
James Sant	1868	Principal Court Painter in Ordinary to Queen Victoria	
Simeon Solomon	1868	Painter	
Harold Speed		Painter	
George Adolphus Storey	1868	Portrait painter, genre painter and illustrator	
Hamo Thornycroft	1883	Sculptor and leading member of the New Sculpture movement	
Henry Tonks	1901	Painter	
John Tweed		Sculptor	
Paul Waterhouse		Architect	
John Reinhard Weguelin	1896	Painter and illustrator	
Victor Weisz	1953	Political cartoonist	
Harry Ellis Wooldridge		Chief designer for James Powell and Sons, stained glass makers	
Thomas Woolner	1868	Sculptor and poet	

== Business ==
Name	Year	Notability	Ref.
Sidney Bernstein, Baron Bernstein	1946	Chairman of Granada Group and the founder of Granada Television	
John Browne, Baron Browne of Madingley		CEO of BP and member of the House of Lords	
William Broderick Cloete		Industrialist	
Erasmus Darwin IV	1909	Director of Cambridge Scientific Instrument Company; secretary of Bolckow and Vaughan; engineer with Mather & Platt	
George Gibb		General manager of the North Eastern Railway, managing director of the Underground Electric Railways Company of London	
Stanley Kalms, Baron Kalms		President and chairman of Currys plc	
Walter Leaf		Chairman of Westminster Bank; co-founder and president of the International Chamber of Commerce	
Alexander MacMillan	1868	Co-founder of Macmillan Publishers	
John Murray III	1868	Publisher with John Murray	
George Haven Putnam		President of G. P. Putnam's Sons	
Wilfrid Voynich		Antiquarian and bibliophile who operated one of the largest rare book businesses in the world	

== Education ==
Name	Year	Notability	Ref.
James Bonar		Helped establish the London Ethical Society, later the London School of Ethics and Philosophy	
Cyril Jackson		Inspector general schoold and head of the education department of Western Australia	
John Edward King		Headmaster of Bedford School and Clifton College; high master of Manchester Grammar School	
James Surtees Phillpotts	1868	Headmaster of Bedford School and the author and editor of educational books	
W. H. D. Rouse		Master of Rugby School, headmaster of The Perse School, Greek and Latin translator, and founding editor of the Loeb Classical Library	

== Entertainment ==
Name	Year	Notability	Ref.
Michael Balcon		film producer with Ealing Studios	
Colin Brazier		presenter for Sky News Today	
Charles Brookfield	1877	Actor and playwright known for The Belle of Mayfair	
Charlie Chaplin	1956, honorary	Actor and filmmaker	
Michael Croft		Actor, playwright, and journalist	
Robert Donat		Academy Award winning actor known for The Count of Monte Cristo, The 39 Steps, and Goodbye, Mr. Chips	
Valentine Dyall		Character actor	
Jimmy Edwards		Comedy actor and writer	
St. John Greer Ervine	1922	Dramatist and theatre manager	
Frederick Fenn		Playwright and drama critic known for The Girl in the Taxi	
James Fisher		Presenter for the BBC Radio series Birds In Britain	
Edward Fox		Actor who won the BAFTA Film Award for The Go-Between and A Bridge Too Far	
Stephen Fry		Actor, comedian, writer, and broadcaster	
Val Gielgud		Writer, director and broadcaster	
Laurence Gilliam		BBC radio producer	
Kenneth Haigh		Actor	
Gilbert Harding		Actor, disc jockey, interviewer and television presenter	
Henry Irving	1875	Stage actor and manager	
Joseph McGrath		Film and television director and screenwriter	
John Merton		Film actor	
Braham Murray		Theatre director; founding director of the Royal Exchange Theatre in Manchester	
Gareth Neame		BBC television director and producer	
Ronald Neame		Filmmaker and cinematographer	
Simon Oates		Actor	
Nigel Planer		British actor, writer and musician	
Roy Plomley		Radio broadcaster, producer, and writer known for the BBC Radio series Desert Island Discs	
Michael Powell		Film director	
Emeric Pressburger		Screenwriter, director, and producer	
Ralph Richardson		Stage actor	
Robert Robinson		Radio and television presenter known for Ask the Family	
Bill Simpson		Film and television actor known for Dr. Finlay's Casebook	
Petroc Trelawny		BBC Radio 3. classical music radio and television broadcaster	
Simon Ward		Stage and film actor known for Young Winston	
Huw Wheldon		BBC executive and broadcaster	

== Government ==
Name	Year	Notability	Ref.
William Bankes Amery		Controller of the Export Licensing Department of the Board of Trade and head of the United Kingdom Food Mission to Australia with the Ministry of Food	
Alan Barlow	1909	Principal Private Secretary to Ramsay MacDonald and under-secretary at HM Treasury	
Bryan Donkin		Commissioner of prisons, director of convict prisons, and medical adviser to the Prison Commission	
George William Forrest		Director of Bombay Records, assistant secretary of the Government of India, and director of the Government of India Records	
Frank Heath		Director of special enquiries and reports and assistant secretary of the universities branch of the Board of Education, secretary to the department of Scientific and Industrial Research	
Arthur Hirtzel		Permanent Under-Secretary of State for India	
Godfrey Lushington	1868	Permanent Under-Secretary of State at the Home Office	
Daniel Morris		Botanist, director of the Jamaica Botanic Department, assistant director of the Royal Botanic Gardens, Kew, and Imperial Commissioner for the West Indian Agricultural Department	
Frederick Needham		Commissioner in Lunacy of the Board of Control for Lunacy and Mental Deficiency; medical superintendent of York Asylum and Barnwood House Hospital	
Hodgson Pratt	1868	Under-secretary to the government of Bengal; founder of the International Arbitration and Peace Association	
Richard Redmayne		Chief Inspector of Mines for the Home Office; chair in mining engineering at the University of Birmingham.	

== Law ==
Name	Year	Notability	Ref.
John Winfield Bonser		Chief justice of British Ceylon	
Ralph B. Cator		Judge of the H.B.M. Supreme Consular Court for the Ottoman Empire; head of the International Mixed Court of Appeals in Egypt	
Charles Chadwyck-Healey		High Sheriff of Somerset, Justice of the Peace, and lawyer	
James Avon Clyde, Lord Clyde		Lord Justice General, Lord Advocate, and Solicitor General for Scotland	
Bernard Coleridge, 2nd Baron Coleridge	1917	Judge of the High Court of Justice and Member of Parliament	
Herbert Cozens-Hardy, 1st Baron Cozens-Hardy	1883	Queen's Counsel, judge, Master of the Rolls, and Member of Parliament	
William Rann Kennedy		Lord Justice of Appeal	
Perceval Maitland Laurence		Judge president of the High Court of Griqualand; chairman of the War Losses Compensation Commission and the Transvaal Delimitation Commissions	
Alexander Waldemar Lawrence		Chief assistant solicitor to the HM Treasury; justice of the peace for Somerset	
Frederick Francis Liddell		First Parliamentary Counsel and King's Counsel	
Frederic Maugham, 1st Viscount Maugham	1893	Lord Chancellor, House of Lords, judge of the High Court of Justice (chancery division), Lord Justice of Appeal, Privy Council, and, Lord of Appeal in Ordinary	
Walter Phillimore, 1st Baron Phillimore	1868	Lord Justice of Appeal and justice of the High Court	
Alfred Chichele Plowden		Metropolitan Police magistrate of the Marlborough Street Magistrates Court	
Havilland de Sausmarez		Chief judge of the British Supreme Court for China; president of the full court of the Supreme Court of Hong Kong; judge of the Supreme Consular Court for the Ottoman Empire	
A. H. Simpson		Judge of the Supreme Court of New South Wales	

== Literature and journalism ==
Name	Year	Notability	Ref.
Richard Adams		Novelist known for Watership Down, Maia, Shardik, and The Plague Dogs.	
John Black Atkins		War correspondent for the Manchester Guardian	
Thomas Spencer Baynes	1868	Editor-in-chief of Encyclopædia Britannica; essayist for Edinburgh Review and Fraser's Magazine; professor of logic and English literature at the University of St Andrews	
Walter Besant	1873	Novelist	
John Sutherland Black		Literary editor and contributor to the Encyclopædia Britannica and Dictionary of National Biography	
Algernon Blackwood	1908	Novelist and short story writer	
Malcolm Bradbury		Novelist and professor of American studies at the University of East Anglia	
Robert Bridges		Poet Laureate of the United Kingdom	
Erskine Childers	1903	Novelist	
Edward Clodd		Biographer and folklorist	
Theodore Andrea Cook		Author, editor of the St. James Gazette and The Field, winner of the silver medal in the art competitions at the 1920 Olympic Games	
James Sutherland Cotton		Author and editor of The Academy	
Jonathan Davis		Columnist for The Independent and Financial Times; journalist with The Sunday Telegraph, The Times, and The Economist	
Michael de la Bédoyère		Biographer, editor of the Catholic Herald, and founded the magazine Search	
Maurice Druon		Novelist and "Perpetual Secretary" of the Académie Française between 1985 and 1999.	
Richardson Evans		Journalist	
Edward G. Fairholme		Chief secretary of the RSPCA and editor of its The Animal World; writer for The Academy, The Nineteenth Century, The Outlook, and The Sketch	
James Fitzmaurice-Kelly		Writer on Spanish literature and Hispanic culture	
Hamilton Fyfe		Editor of Daily Mirror and the Daily Herald	
J. L. Garvin	1906	Editor of The Observer	
A. D. Godley		Poet and Public Orator at the University of Oxford	
William Golding		Novelist, playwright, and poet best known for Lord of the Flies; winner of the 1983 Nobel Prize in Literature	
Edmund Gosse	1876	Poet, author, and critic who lectured in English literature at Cambridge University	
Winston Graham		Novelist known for the Poldark series	
Frederick Greenwood	1868	Journalist, founding editor of the Pall Mall Gazette and St James's Gazette	
John Hadfield		Writer and publisher, best known for Love on a Branch Line	
H. Rider Haggard	1887	Writer of adventure fiction romances	
Alfred Egmont Hake	1879	Author and social thinker	
Patrick Hamilton		Playwright and novelist, known for the plays Rope and Gas Light	
Thomas Hardy		Novelist and poet	
Austin Harrison		Journalist and editor of The English Review	
E. S. P. Haynes		Writer	
William Ernest Henley	1883	Poet, writer, critic, and editor	
Henry Higgs		Historian of economic thought, assistant editor of The Economic Journal, and contributor to the Dictionary of Political Economy	
Anthony Hope		Novelist and playwright known for The Prisoner of Zenda	
E. W. Hornung	1913	Author and poet	
Richard Holt Hutton	1868	Co-editor of the National Review and the Spectator	
Henry James	1883	Novelist known for The Portrait of a Lady, The Ambassadors, and The Golden Bowl	
Charles Francis Keary		Novelist, historian, and scholar	
Benjamin Kidd		Author of Social Evolution	
Patrick Kidd		Journalist, author, and blogger specialising in sport	
Rudyard Kipling	1891	Journalist, novelist, poet, and short-story writer known for the The Jungle Book duology	
Frederick Harcourt Kitchin		Novelist and publisher of The Times Financial and Commercial Supplement	
Edward Frederick Knight		Nonfiction author and war correspondent	
Andrew Lang	1871	Poet, novelist, literary critic, and contributor to the field of anthropology	
Daniel Conner Lathbury	1868	Editor of the The Guardian; joint-editor of The Economist	
John le Carré		Novelist	
Robin Legge		Chief music critic of The Daily Telegraph	
Charles Godfrey Leland	1879	Humorist and folklorist	
Quentin Letts		Journalist and theatre critic for The Daily Telegraph, Daily Mail, Mail on Sunday, and The Oldie	
Eric Linklater		Poet, fiction writer, military historian, and travel writer	
Sidney Royse Lysaght		Writer and poet	
Maarten Maartens		Writer	
Percy Ewing Matheson	1888	Writer	
A. A. Milne	1908	Writer best known for children's books about Winnie-the-Pooh	
Mike Molloy		Newspaper editor, cartoonist, and writer of children's books	
Robert Hope Moncrieff		Author of children's fiction and of Black's Guides	
James Augustus Cotter Morison	1879	Essayist and historian	
Frank Muir		Comedy writer; radio and television personality	
Frederic W. H. Myers	1868	Poet, classicist, philologist, and a founder of the Society for Psychical Research	
Henry Newbolt	1902	Poet, novelist, and historian	
Alfred Ollivant		Novelist, known for Owd Bob	
Walter Pater	1869	Essayist, art and literary critic, and fiction writer	
Coventry Patmore	1874	Poet and literary critic	
Charles Kegan Paul	1868	Author, minister, and owner of C. Kegan Paul & Co. publishing	
Stephen Potter		Writer best known for parodies of self-help books	
J. B. Priestley		Novelist, playwright, screenwriter, broadcaster, and social commentator	
John Pudney		Poet, journalist, and author	
T. W. Rolleston		Poet, writer, and translator	
Robbie Ross	1893	Journalist, art critic, and art dealer	
Anthony Sampson		Nonfiction writer and publisher	
Owen Seaman		Writer, journalist, and poet best known as the editor of Punch magazine	
Stephen Spender		Poet, novelist, and United States Poet Laureate	
C. P. Snow		Novelist	
James Suckling		Wine and cigar critic	
Robert Louis Stevenson	1874	Novelist, essayist, and poet known for Treasure Island, Strange Case of Dr Jekyll and Mr Hyde, and Kidnapped	
Lytton Strachey	1909	Biographer; author of Eminent Victorians	
G. S. Street		Critic, journalist and novelist	
Frank Swinnerton	1922	Author of more than fifty books	
John Todhunter	1879	Poet and playwright	
H. M. Tomlinson		Writer, novelist, journalist, and essayist	
Hugh Walpole	1911	Novelist	
H. B. Marriott Watson		Novelist, journalist, playwright, and short-story writer	
Henry Edward Watts	1868	Journalist and author on Spanish topics, best known for his translation of Don Quixote	
Arthur Waugh		Author, literary critic, and publisher	
Evelyn Waugh		Writer of novels, biographies, and travel books	
H. G. Wells		Writer known for The Time Machine, The Island of Doctor Moreau, The Invisible Man, and The War of the Worlds	
John George Wood	1868	Writer who popularised natural history; chaplain to the Boatmen's Floating Chapel at Oxford and St. Bartholomew's Hospital.	
W. B. Yeats	1917	Poet, dramatist, writer, and literary critic; recipient of the 1923 Nobel Prize in Literature; and senator of the Irish Free State	

== Medicine ==
Name	Year	Notability	Ref.
Henry Charlton Bastian	1868	Physician with the National Hospital for the Paralysed and Epileptic; professor of clinical medicine at the UCL Medical School	
Arthur Bell		Physician and consultant paediatrician with Charing Cross Hospital and Belgrave Hospital for Children	
Andrew Clark, 1st Baronet	1868	Pathologist for Haslar Hospital; museum curator and assistant physician of the London Hospital	
Robert Walter Doyne		Ophthalmologist and founder of the Oxford Eye Hospital	
Thomas Watts Eden		Obstetric physician to Charing Cross Hospital and consulting surgeon to Queen Charlotte's Hospital	
George Fayad		Chairman of the ear, nose, and throat department at the Basildon and Thurrock University Hospitals NHS Foundation Trust	
Edwin Hurry Fenwick		Urologist	
Edmund Gurney	1875	Psychologist and parapsychologist	
Bernard Hart	1915	Physician for psychological medicine at University College Hospital	
Ernest Hart	1868	Ophthalmic surgeon at St Mary's Hospital, London; editor of the British Medical Journal	
Henry Head		Neurologist	
Frederic William Hewitt		Honorary member of staff of the King Edward VII's Hospital; anaesthetist at the London Hospital	
George Makins		Surgeon at St Thomas' Hospital	
Charles Martin		Director of the Lister Institute of Preventive Medicine	
Henry Maudsley		Psychiatrist at the West London Hospital	
Charles Mercier		Psychiatrist and leading expert on forensic psychiatry and insanity	
Charles Samuel Myers		Physician who worked as a psychologist	
Edmund Owen		Resident medical officer and lecturer of anatomy at St Mary's Hospital, London	
Joseph Frank Payne	1868	Physician, epidemiologist, and medical historian	
Henry George Plimmer		Doctor and medical researcher with Cancer Hospital and St Mary's Hospital, London; director of the cancer laboratories of Lister Institute	
Marc Armand Ruffer		Pioneer of modern paleopathology; first director of the British Institute of Preventive Medicine; professor of bacteriology at the Faculty of Medicine, Cairo University	
Charles Rycroft		Psychiatrist and psychoanalyst	
Arthur Shadwell		Physician; medical advisor to the Metropolitan Asylums Board; trustee for the Queen Victoria Jubilee Institute for Nurses; assistant physician at the Sussex County Hospital; and writer about public health and temperance	
James Sherren		Surgeon at The London Hospital	
Samuel Squire Sprigge		House surgeon at the West London Hospital; house physician with Brompton Hospital; editor of The Lancet	
Cuthbert Wallace		Surgeon at St Thomas's Hospital	

== Military ==
Name	Year	Notability	Ref.
Freddie Spencer Chapman		British Army officer during World War II	
Henry Karslake		British Army Lieutenant-General	
T. E. Lawrence	1918; temporary honorary member	British Army officer, diplomat and writer known for his role in the Arab Revolt and Sinai and Palestine campaign	
William Macpherson		Major General of the Royal Army Medical Corps	
Vivian Dering Majendie	1868	Chief Inspector of Explosives; captain instructor and assistant superintendent at the Royal Arsenal	
Aubrey Dean Paul		British Army captain in the Northumberland Fusiliers	
George Pirie Thomson		Rear Admiral in the British Royal Navy; Britain's Chief Press Censor during World War II	

== Music ==
Name	Year	Notability	Ref.
William Alwyn		Composer of more than 200 cinematic scores	
Julian Anderson		Composer and teacher of composition	
Richard Arnell		Composer of classical music	
Malcolm Arnold		Composer and conductor	
Martin James Bartlett		Classical pianist	
Arthur Benjamin		Composer, pianist, conductor, and teacher	
Arthur Bliss		Composer and conductor	
Adrian Boult	1916	Conductor	
Francis Chagrin		Composer	
Walter Willson Cobbett		Sponsored competitions for the composition of new chamber music works, endowed the Cobbett Medal for services to chamber music, and compiled Cobbett's Cyclopedic Survey of Chamber Music	
H. C. Colles	1919	Organist and music critic	
Edward Joseph Dent	1905	Musicologist and music critic	
Edward Elgar		Composer	
Gervase Elwes		Tenor	
Douglas Fox		Pianist, organist, and music teacher	
H. Balfour Gardiner		Conductor	
Ron Goodwin		Composer and conductor	
Harry Plunket Greene		Baritone singer	
Bernard Herrmann		Composer	
Herbert Howells	1922	Composer, organist, and teacher	
Norman Kay		Composer	
Charles Harford Lloyd		Composer and organist	
Andrew Lloyd Webber		Composer and impresario of musical theatre	
William Lloyd Webber		Organist and composer	
John Alexander Fuller Maitland		Music scholar and critic	
Muir Mathieson		Conductor	
Hubert Parry		Composer, teacher, and music historian	
André Previn		Conductor, composer, and pianist	
Roger Quilter		Composer	
John Scott		Composer and jazz musician	
Cecil Sharp		Composer and collector of folk songs, folk dances, and instrumental music	
Arthur Somervell		Composer and educationalist	
William Barclay Squire		Musicologist, head of the music department at the British Museum, and librettist	
Charles Villiers Stanford		Conductor and composer	
A. H. Fox Strangways		Musicologist	
Virgil Thomson		Composer and music critic	
William Walton		Composer	

== Politics ==
Name	Year	Notability	Ref.
Leo Abse		Member of Parliament	
Thomas Dyke Acland, 12th Baronet	1868	Deputy Warden of the Stannaries, Member of Parliament, High Sheriff of Devon	
Sir William Anson, 3rd Baronet	1868	Member of Parliament, Vice-Chancellor of Oxford University, Parliamentary Secretary to the Board of Education	
Samuel Baker	1868	Governor-General of the Equatorial Nile Basin (today's South Sudan and Northern Uganda), Pasha and Major-General in the Ottoman Empire and Egypt, explorer of central Africa	
Arthur Balfour		Prime Minister of the United Kingdom and Member of Parliament	
Humphry Berkeley		Member of Parliament	
Stopford Brooke		Member of Parliament	
Annan Bryce		Member of Parliament and Legislative Council of Burma	
James Bryce, 1st Viscount Bryce	1868	British Ambassador to the United States, Chief Secretary for Ireland, Chancellor of the Duchy of Lancaster, Under-Secretary of State for Foreign Affairs, and President of the Board of Trade	
Robert Bulwer-Lytton, 1st Earl of Lytton	1887	Viceroy and Governor-General of India; British Ambassador to France	
George Campbell, 8th Duke of Argyll	1868	Secretary of State for India, Lord Privy Seal, Postmaster General of the United Kingdom	
John Frederick Cheetham	1868	Member of Parliament; cotton manufacturer	
Henry Cotton		Member of Parliament and president of the Indian National Congress	
Harold Cox		Member of Parliament	
Savile Crossley, 1st Baron Somerleyton		Paymaster General	
Charles Crosthwaite		Chief Commissioner of Burma	
Charles Dalrymple, 1st Baronet	1868	Privy Council, Member of Parliament, Justice of the Peace and Deputy Lieutenant for East Lothian	
Leonard Darwin	1871	Member of Parliament	
Walter Edward Davidson		Governor of New South Wales, Governor of Newfoundland, Governor of the Seychelles	
Ronald Dalzell, 12th Earl of Carnwath		Peer of Scotland	
Charles Dilke, 2nd Baronet	1872	Member of Parliament and President of the Local Government Board	
Patrick Duncan		Governor-General of South Africa; Minister for the Interior, Education and Public Health; House of Assembly (South Africa)	
H. A. L. Fisher		Member of Parliament, President of the Board of Education	
William Edward Forster	1868	Chief Secretary for Ireland, Member of Parliament	
Clement Freud		Member of Parliament and Lord Rector of the University of St Andrews	
Arthur Foljambe, 2nd Earl of Liverpool		Governor of New Zealand and Governor-General of New Zealand	
Julian Goldsmid	1868	Member of Parliament	
George Goschen, 1st Viscount Goschen	1887	First Lord of the Admiralty, Chancellor of the Exchequer, Member of Parliament	
Edward Grigg, 1st Baron Altrincham		Governor of Kenya, Member of Parliament	
Frederick Hamilton-Temple-Blackwood, 1st Marquess of Dufferin and Ava	1868	Viceroy and Governor-General of India, Governor General of Canada, Chancellor of the Duchy of Lancaster, and British Ambassador to France	
Frederick Hamilton-Temple-Blackwood, 3rd Marquess of Dufferin and Ava		Speaker of the Senate of Northern Ireland	
William Harcourt	1869	Member of Parliament, Home Secretary, Chancellor of the Exchequer, Leader of the Opposition	
David Hardman		Member of Parliament	
Francis Capel Harrison	1896	Member of Parliament and London County Council	
Thomas Hart-Davies		Member of Parliament	
Jerry Hayes		Member of Parliament	
James Headlam-Morley		Foreign office specialist on the British Empire Delegation to the Paris Peace Conference	
A. P. Herbert	1868	Member of Parliament	
Auberon Herbert	1868	Member of Parliament	
Henry Herbert, 4th Earl of Carnarvon	1868	Lord Lieutenant of Hampshire, Secretary of State for the Colonies, Lord Lieutenant of Ireland	
Robert Herbert	1868	1st Premier of Queensland, member of the Queensland Legislative Assembly	
James Heywood	1868	Member of Parliament; royal commissioner for the University of Oxford and the University of Cambridge	
Thomas Hughes	1868	Member of Parliament; author known for Tom Brown's School Days	
Frederick John Jackson		Lieutenant-Governor of the East African Protectorate and Governor of Uganda	
Richard Claverhouse Jebb	1868	Member of Parliament; Regius Professor of Greek at the University of Cambridge	
Robert Kennard	1868	Member of Parliament, Sheriff of London and Middlesex, founder of Blaenavon Coal and Iron Company	
Seymour King		Member of Parliament and first Mayor of Kensington	
George Blundell Longstaff		London County Council, justice of the peace, and Poor Law guardian	
Compton Mackenzie	1912	Co-founder of the National Party of Scotland; writer of fiction, biography, and histories	
Bryan Magee		Member of Parliament	
Charles McLaren, 1st Baron Aberconway	1871	Member of Parliament	
Henry McMahon		British High Commissioner to Egypt	
Edward Miall	1868	Member of Parliament, former of the British Anti-State-Church Association	
Richard Monckton Milnes, 1st Baron Houghton	1868	Member of Parliament and poet	
John Morley	1868	Chief Secretary for Ireland, Member of Parliament, Secretary of State for India, and Lord President of the Council	
Philip Morrell		Member of Parliament	
Alfred Morrison	1868	High Sheriff of Wiltshire; collector of art, autographs, and manuscripts	
Walter Morrison	1868	Member of Parliament	
Francis Mowatt	1868	Alderman of the London County Council; civil servant at the Head of the Treasury	
Ernest Noel	1868	Member of Parliament; chairman of the Artizans, Labourers & General Dwellings Company	
Stafford Northcote, 1st Earl of Iddesleigh	1868	First Lord of the Treasury, Chancellor of the Exchequer, Secretary of State for Foreign Affairs, and President of the Board of Trade	
William Palliser	1868	Member of Parliament	
Edward Reed	1868	Member of Parliament; Chief Constructor of the Royal Navy; naval architect	
William Pember Reeves		High Commissioner to the United Kingdom, Minister of Labour, Minister of Education, and New Zealand Parliament	
George Scott Robertson		Member of Parliament; Surgeon Major with the Indian Medical Service and the Indian Foreign Office	
Cecil Spring Rice		British Ambassador to the United States	
Everard im Thurn		Governor of Fiji	
David Young, Baron Young of Graffham		Secretary of State for Trade and Industry, President of the Board of Trade, Secretary of State for Employment, and Minister without Portfolio	

== Religion ==
Name	Year	Notability	Ref.
William Colvin		Church of England priest and Dean of Killala	
Mandell Creighton	1869	Church of England Bishop of London and academic	
John Llewelyn Davies	1868	Honorary Chaplain to the Queen; vicar of Christ Church, Marylebone and Kirkby Lonsdale	
William George Lawes		Congregationalist minister and missionary in New Guinea	
Christopher Lowson		Church of England Bishop of Lincoln	
Derek Pattinson		Secretary-general of the General Synod of the Church of England	
Edmund Pearce		Church of England Bishop of Derby	
John Tims		Archdeacon of Calgary	
Richard St John Tyrwhitt	1869	Vicar of St Mary Magdalen's Church, Oxford; author about art and religion	

== Science and technology ==
Name	Year	Notability	Ref.
Francis William Aston	1920	Fellow of Trinity College, Cambridge who won the 1922 Nobel Prize in Chemistry	
Mark Barr		Electrical engineer, physicist, inventor, and polymath	
Francis Arthur Bather		Palaeontologist, geologist, and keeper of the Department of Geology at the Natural History Museum	
Horace Tabberer Brown		Chemist with Worthington Brewery	
William Christie	1881	Astronomer Royal at the Royal Observatory at Greenwich	
Charles Galton Darwin	1919	Physicist who served as director of the National Physical Laboratory	
Francis Darwin	1882	Botanist who worked with his father Charles Darwin	
George Darwin	1870	Astronomer known for the harmonic analysis of the theory of tides	
William Erasmus Darwin	1871	Subject of child development studies by Charles Darwin	
Arthur Eddington	1920	Astronomer with the Royal Observatory	
Ronald Fisher		Founder of quantitative genetics; created the foundations for modern statistical sciences	
Lazarus Fletcher		Geologist; director and keeper of mineralogy at the Natural History Museum	
Sidney Frederic Harmer		Superintendent of the Cambridge University Museum of Zoology; Keeper of Zoology and director of the Natural History Museum, London	
Walter Heape		Zoologist known for the first successful mammalian embryo transfer	
Arthur William Hill		Botanist; director of the Royal Botanic Gardens, Kew	
Julian Huxley		Evolutionary biologist, secretary of the Zoological Society of London, and the first director of UNESCO	
Peter Chalmers Mitchell		Zoologist, secretary of the Zoological Society of London, creator of Whipsnade Zoo	
Charles Algernon Parsons	1919	Mechanical engineer and who designed the modern steam turbine; founder of C. A. Parsons and Company	
Henry Harold Welch Pearson		Botanist, founder of Kirstenbosch National Botanical Garden	
Reginald Innes Pocock		Zoologist with the Natural History Museum, London and superintendent of the London Zoo	
David Prain	1906	Botanist and director of the Royal Botanic Gardens, Kew	
George Romanes	1879	Evolutionary biologist and physiologist who invented comparative psychology	
Charles Rothschild		Entomologist and founder of the UK's first nature reserve	
Alexander Scott		Director of scientific research at the British Museum	
Dukinfield Henry Scott		Botanist; first keeper of the Jodrell Laboratory at the Royal Botanic Gardens, Kew; and assistant professor in biology at the Royal College of Science	
Frederick Selous	1894	Explorer, professional hunter, and conservationist	
Charles Michie Smith		Astronomer; founder and first director of the Kodaikanal Solar Observatory	
Herbert Huntingdon Smith		Naturalist and amateur conchologist who worked on the flora and fauna of Brazil	
Herbert Spencer		Biologist, sociologist, and anthropologist who originated the expression "survival of the fittest"	
Hermann Sprengel		Chemist who discovered the explosive nature of picric acid	
Otto Stapf		Botanist and keeper of the herbarium at Royal Botanic Gardens, Kew	
Oldfield Thomas		Zoologist with the Natural History Museum, London	

== Sports ==
Name	Year	Notability	Ref.
C. B. Fry		Cricketer	
Cecil Headlam		Cricketer	
Tony Miles		Chess grandmaster	
Charles Edmund Newton-Robinson	1910	Fencer who competed in the 1936 Summer Olympics	

== Fictional members ==
Fictional Savilians include Bill Haydon, the intelligence officer in John le Carré's Tinker Tailor Soldier Spy; William French, the wine merchant in Alexander McCall Smith's The Dog Who Came in from the Cold; and Samuel Ordington-Mortimer in The Spectator.

== See also ==
- List of London's gentlemen's clubs
