= Beautiful World =

Beautiful World may refer to:

== Albums ==
- Beautiful World (Arashi album), 2011
- Beautiful World (Big Head Todd album) or the title song, 1997
- Beautiful World (Connie Talbot album) or the title song, 2012
- Beautiful World (Paul Carrack album) or the title song, 1997
- Beautiful World (Take That album) or the title song, 2006
- A Beautiful World, by Robin Thicke, 2002
- Beautiful World, by Patrick O'Hearn, 2003
- Beautiful World, by Take 6, 2002

== Songs ==
- "Beautiful World" (Devo song), 1981
- "Beautiful World" (Hikaru Utada song), 2007
- "Beautiful World" (Westlife song), 2011
- "I.G.Y. (What a Beautiful World)", by Donald Fagen, 1982
- "Beautiful World", by Archive from Londinium, 1996
- "Beautiful World", by Blasterjaxx and DBSTF featuring Ryder, 2015
- "Beautiful World", by Bon Jovi from What About Now, 2013
- "Beautiful World", by the Chevin from Borderland, 2012
- "Beautiful World", by Colin Hay from Man @ Work, 2003
- "Beautiful World", by Collective Soul from Hints Allegations and Things Left Unsaid, 1993
- "Beautiful World", by Dierks Bentley from Feel That Fire, 2009
- "Beautiful World", by the Kooks from 10 Tracks to Echo in the Dark, 2022
- "Beautiful World", by Michael Bolton, representing Connecticut in the American Song Contest, 2022
- "Beautiful World", by Parannoul from To See the Next Part of the Dream, 2021
- "Beautiful World", by Sara Jorge from R3MIX, 2007
- "The Beautiful World", by Ai Maeda, a theme from the light novel Kino's Journey (see below), 2003

== Other uses ==
- Beautiful World (musician), Phil Sawyer (born 1947), English musician
- Beautiful World (TV series), a 2019 South Korean television series
- Kino's Journey: The Beautiful World, a 2003 Japanese light novel series by Keiichi Sigsawa
- A Beautiful World, a journal published 1893–c. 1922 by the Scapa Society
