= Charis Frankenburg =

English author and birth control activist (1892–1985)

Charis Ursula Frankenburg
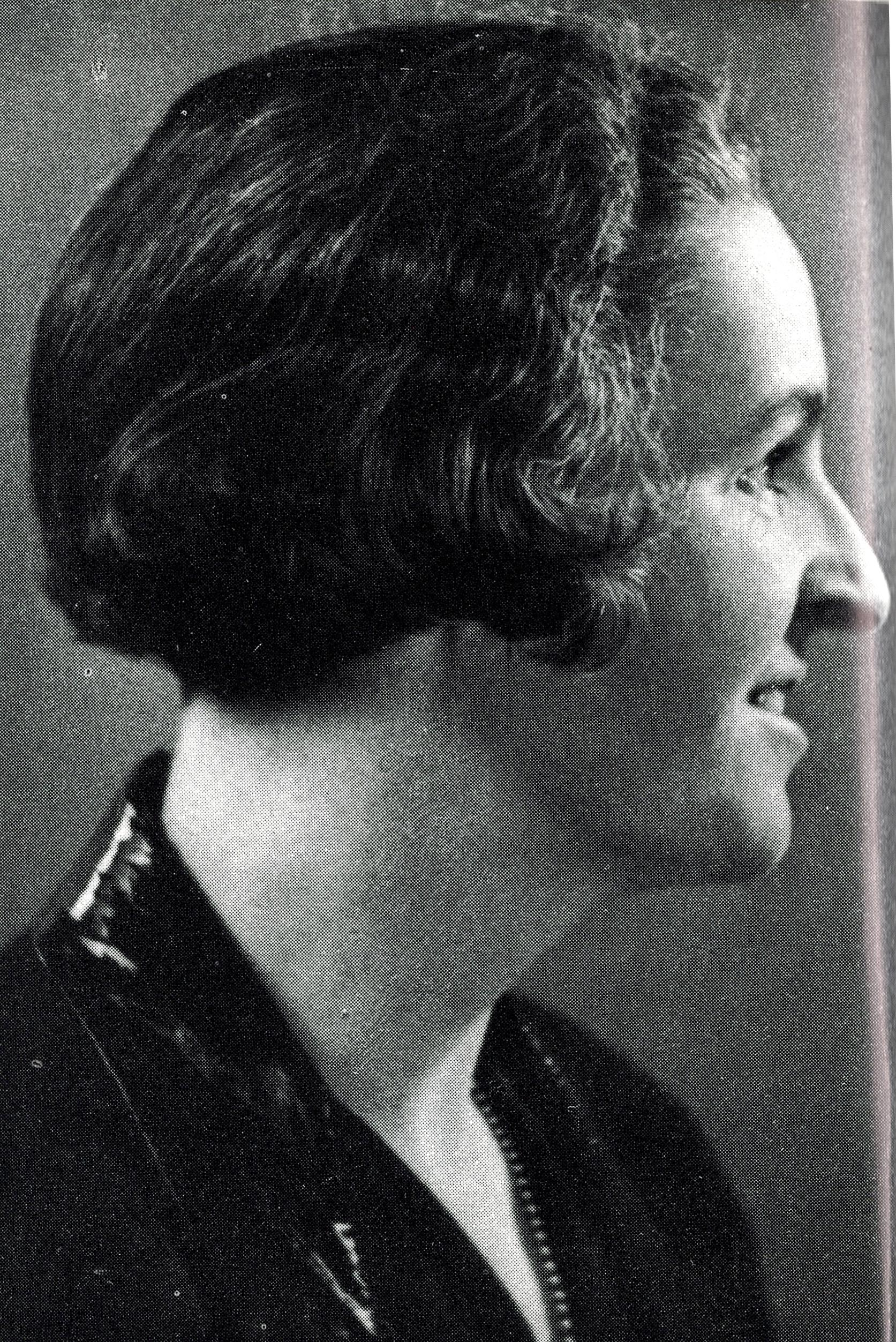
- Born: Charis Ursula Barnett; 9 February 1892; Isleworth, London, England
- Died: 5 April 1985 (aged 93); Newbury, Berkshire, England
- Education: Bedales School; St Paul's Girls' School; Somerville College, Oxford
- Occupations: Author; birth control activist; magistrate
- Known for: Co-founding the Manchester, Salford and District Mothers' Clinic
- Spouse: Sydney Solomon Frankenburg (m. 1918; died 1935)
- Children: 4
- Parents: Percy Barnett (father); Annie Barnett (mother)
- Relatives: Mary Stocks (cousin)

Charis Ursula Frankenburg (née Barnett}; 9 February 1892 – 5 April 1985) was an English author, one of the first women eligible for a degree from the University of Oxford, a founder of one of the first birth control clinics in England outside London, and a member of The Mutual Admiration Society.

== Early life and education ==
Charis Barnett was born on 9 February 1892 in Isleworth, London, the daughter of British educator Percy Barnett and his wife, Annie Barnett (née Beeching). After attending Bedales School, near Petersfield, and St Paul's Girls' School, Hammersmith, she began her studies at Somerville College, Oxford in 1912, where she met Dorothy L. Sayers and Muriel Jaeger, but was prevented from completing them by the outbreak of World War I. Instead she became a midwife and nurse, and worked in the maternity hospital of Châlons-sur-Marne. She was awarded a "war degree" from Oxford.

== Charity activities ==
On 19 February 1918, she married Sydney Solomon Frankenburg (1881–1935), an army captain who was her cousin. They had four children. After they moved to near Salford, in the north-west of England, where his family business was located, Charis Frankenburg took up various local charitable roles. She became particularly active in the field of maternity care, focusing at first on the importance of midwives who had received adequate training. In 1922 she published Common Sense in the Nursery. She became interested in educating working-class women about birth control methods, and in 1926 co-founded the Manchester, Salford and District Mothers' Clinic with her schoolfriend Mary Stocks, after seeking advice from Marie Stopes. The clinic only served women who were already mothers.

In 1938, a few years after being widowed, Frankenburg became a Salford Justice of the Peace, and worked in the juvenile court. She returned to London in the 1950s, retaining her Salford JP position. There she chaired the Public Health and Child Welfare Committee of the National Council of Women and also served as vice-chair of its Public Service and Magistrates Committee; in the early 1960s, the latter committee worked to reform laws on jury service so that all women could serve.

She retired in 1967, and published her autobiography, Not Old, Madam, Vintage in 1975.

Brian Harrison recorded 2 oral history interviews with Frankenburg, in April 1977 and July 1981, as part of the Suffrage Interviews project, titled Oral evidence on the suffragette and suffragist movements: the Brian Harrison interviews. Topics of the 1977 interview include birth control and concerns about maternal mortality, the clinic in Salford and her partnership with Mary Stocks, and her time at Oxford. The 1981 interview focuses on her upbringing and conservatism, her career and support for women's causes.

She died on 5 April 1985 at Newbury, Berkshire.

== Bibliography ==
Her books include:

- Common Sense in the Nursery (1913)
- Latin with Laughter (1930)
- More Latin with Laughter (1934)
- I'm All Right, Or, Spoilt Baby Into Angry Young Man (1960)
- Common Sense about Children: A Parents' Guide to Delinquency (1973)
- Not Old, Madam, Vintage: An Autobiography (1975)

== Awards and honours ==
Her work in France during World War I was awarded the Médaille Commémorative de la Grand Guerre. In 1973, she was given the freedom of the city of Salford, for her work as a JP and for "service in field of health and social welfare".
