= Scapa =

Scapa may refer to:

- Scapa distillery, a Scottish distillery
- Scapa Flow, a body of water in Scotland
- Scapa Society (Society for Checking the Abuses in Public Advertising), UK society founded 1893
- Supermarine Scapa, an aircraft

== People with the name ==
- James R. Scapa, founder of Altair Engineering

== See also ==
- Scapa Flow (disambiguation)
