= Abraham Aguilar =

British slave trader

Abraham Aguilar (died 1794) was a British slave trader of Portuguese descent.

Aguilar was the only known Jewish slave factor in Kingston, Jamaica in the 1760s and 1770s. He operated with other non-Jewish merchants in the firm of Coppells & Aguilar.

In 1789, he had a large detached house built at 24, West Side, Wimbledon Common, London, now known as The Kier.

When Aguilar's will was proved in 1794, he owned property in London's Devonshire Square. He bequeathed all of his "negro and other slaves" to his wife Judith. As far as his liquid wealth was concerned, the largest sum was £30,000, worth more than £3,000,000 in today's money, was passed to his trustees which included his brother Isaac Aguilar, his cousin Emanuel Baruch Lousada the younger, Isaac Baruch Lousada and David Samuda. They were instructed to pay interest on that sum to his wife Judith for life with power for her to will £10,000 of the principal upon her death. Abraham Aguilar left another £20,000 to his daughter Rebecca and her children.
