= The Kier =

House in Wimbledon, London, England

Coordinates: 51.4259°N 0.2291°W

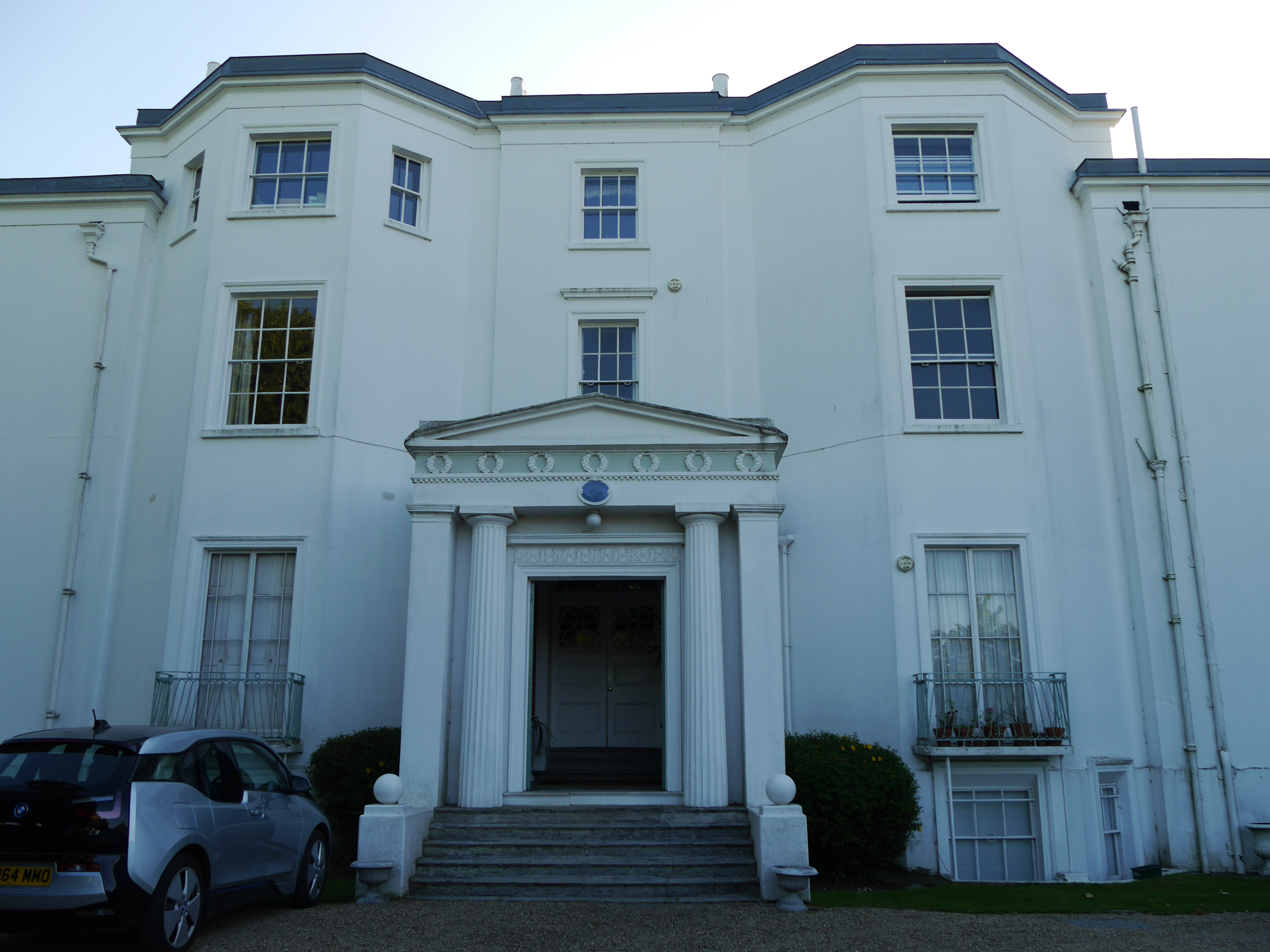
The Kier, 2016

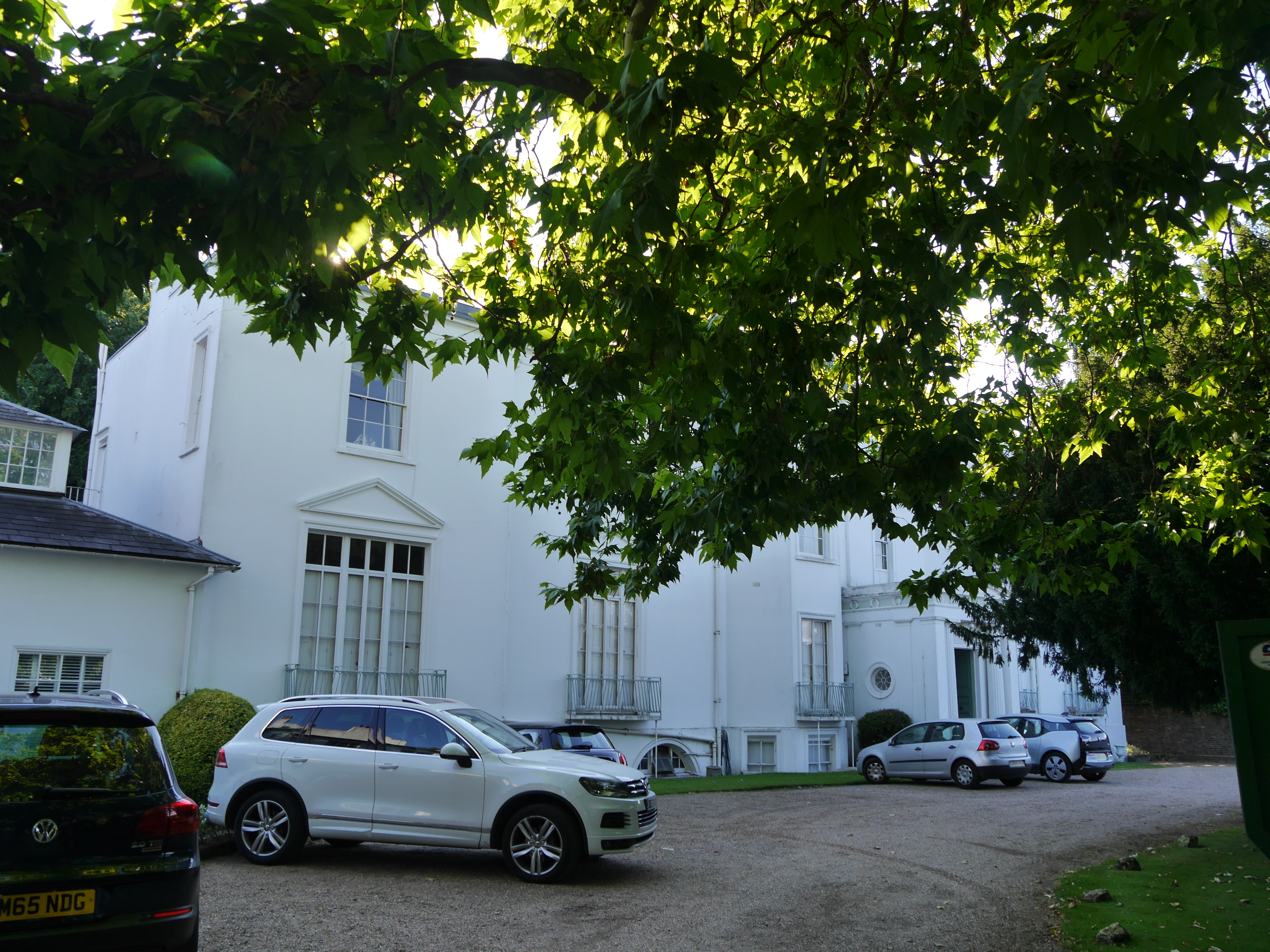
The Kier, 2016

The Kier (sometimes The Keir) is a Grade II listed house on the west side of Wimbledon Common, built in 1789, later extended and now subdivided into nine flats.

The house was built in 1789 for the Aguilar family of Portuguese Jews. In 1812, it was acquired by the McEvoy family, who were Roman Catholics. They enlarged the garden by demolishing some cottages, converting one into a Victorian Gothic residence for their personal chaplain and another into a private chapel. In 1850, what was #24 became known as The Kier. Around 1922, it became a girls' finishing school. In 1932, it was bought by the owner of nearby Cannizaro House, who converted it into nine flats and added much of the garden (including the private chapel) to that of Cannizaro House, now Cannizaro Park.

Recorded occupants of The Keir include: Abraham Aguilar (1789), Christopher McEvoy (1810), Peter McEvoy (1838), Lady Cunyngham (1886), Thomas and Mrs Rudd (1891–1906), Lord Kensington (1925). and Richardson Evans (1846–1928), a British civil servant, journalist and author.
