= Annie Barnett =

English writer and editor (1862–1941)

- Born: Annie Beeching; 12 December 1861; Paddington, Middlesex, England
- Died: 1941 (aged 79); Paddington, London, England
- Education: North London Collegiate School; London University
- Occupations: Writer; editor
- Spouse: Percy Arthur Barnett (m. 1888)
- Children: 1, including Charis
- Relatives: Henry Beeching (brother)
- Writing career
- Pen name: Mrs. P. A. Barnett
- Period: 1900–1911
- Notable work: Drifting Thistledown (1910)

Annie Barnett (née Beeching; 12 December 1861 – 1941), also known as Mrs P. A. Barnett, was an English writer and editor. She edited anthologies of prose and verse, including books for children, and co-authored the epistolary novel Drifting Thistledown (1910). She supported women's suffrage and was the mother of the birth control campaigner and writer Charis Frankenburg.

== Biography ==
=== Early life and education ===
Barnett was born Annie Beeching in Paddington, Middlesex, on 12 December 1861 to James Plummer George Beeching and Harriet Beeching (née Skaife).

Her father was a bookseller and her brother was the author Henry Beeching, Dean of Norwich. She was educated at North London Collegiate school and later studied at the University of London.

=== Career ===
Barnett edited books of prose and verse, including works for children. She also co-authored an epistolary novel, Drifting Thistledown. An article about the book appeared in The New York Times.

=== Personal life and death ===
Barnett married Percy Arthur Barnett (1858–1941), an educationalist and school inspector, at Hampstead in 1888. They had two children: Denis, who died in the First World War, and Charis. Barnett supported women's suffrage and took Charis to hear suffragette speakers in Hyde Park on several occasions. Charis later became a writer and an activist for birth control.

Barnett died in Paddington, London, in the second quarter of 1941, aged 79.

== Publications ==
- A Little Book of English Prose. London: Methuen & Co. 1900.
- Golden Numbers: A Book of Verse for Boys and Girls. London: Longmans, Green & Co. 1907.
- Song and Story: Selections of Verse. A & C Black. 1907.
- The Children's Way: A Book of Verses About Children. Selected and arranged by Mrs. P. A. Barnett. London: Jarrold & Sons. 1910.
- Drifting Thistledown. With another. London: Longmans, Green & Co. 1910.
- An Anthology of Modern English Prose (1741 to 1892). With Lucy Dale. London: Longmans, Green & Co. 1911.
- Stories from Hans Andersen. Selected and arranged by Mrs. P. A. Barnett. London: Macmillan & Co. 1911.
