= Scapa Flow (disambiguation) =

Scapa Flow is a body of water in the Orkney Islands.

Scapa Flow may also refer to:

- Scapa Flow (band), an electronic body music band
- Scapa Flow (film), a 1930 German film
- Scapa Flow (horse), an American Thoroughbred racehorse
- Scapa Flow (British horse), dam of Pharos

== See also ==
- Scapa (disambiguation)
- Scuttling of the German fleet at Scapa Flow
