= Percy Barnett =

British educationalist and author

Percy Arthur Barnett (1858 – 26 October 1941) was a British educationalist and author, Superintendent of Education for the Colony of Natal, and Chief Inspector of Training of Teachers in England.

== Early life and education ==
Barnett was born in Plymouth, the son of a Jewish research chemist, but was orphaned and grew up in the Jews' Hospital and Orphan Asylum, Norwood. He became a student at the City of London School and at Trinity College, Oxford. He won a scholarship to Oxford in 1877, and finished in 1881 with a first in literature humanities.

== Career ==
Barnett was a professor of English at Firth College, Sheffield, a predecessor of the University of Sheffield, from 1882 to 1888. He was named principal of the Borough Road Teacher Training College, a predecessor of the West London Institute of Higher Education, in 1888. In this post, he promoted athleticism, from his "Oxbridge belief in the value of games". He became an inspector of schools in 1893. Between 1902 and 1904 he was Superintendent of Education in the Colony of Natal and a member of the Civil Service Board of Natal and the Council of the University of Cape Colony. His wife's letters from this period are archived at the Bodleian Library, University of Oxford. He became Chief Inspector of Training on his return to England in 1905, and continued in that post until 1912.

== Books ==
Barnett's books include:

- Teaching and Organisation, with Special Reference to Secondary Schools: A Manual of Practice (Longmans, Green, and co., 1897)
- The Little Book of Health and Courtesy (1905) (reprinted as part of Life in a Bustle: Advice to Youth) (with Sir Alfred Milner and C. G. Montefiore, 2017).
- Common Sense in Education and Teaching: An Introduction to Practice (Longmans, Green, and co., 1899; 5th ed., 1906)
- Natal, The State and the Citizen (Longmans, Green, and co., 1904)
- The Story of Robinson Crusoe in Latin (with G. E. Goffeaux, Longmans, Green, and co., 1907)
- Common Sense Grammar (1923)

== Personal life ==
Barnett is recorded as having converted to the Christian faith. His wife, Annie Barnett (née Beeching; 1862–1941), was active in the suffrage movement; her father sold books and her brother was Henry Charles Beeching, a writer and the Dean of Norwich. Their daughter was Charis Frankenburg (1892–1985).

He died on 26 October 1941.
