= Thomas Raleigh =

British academic administrator (1850–1920)

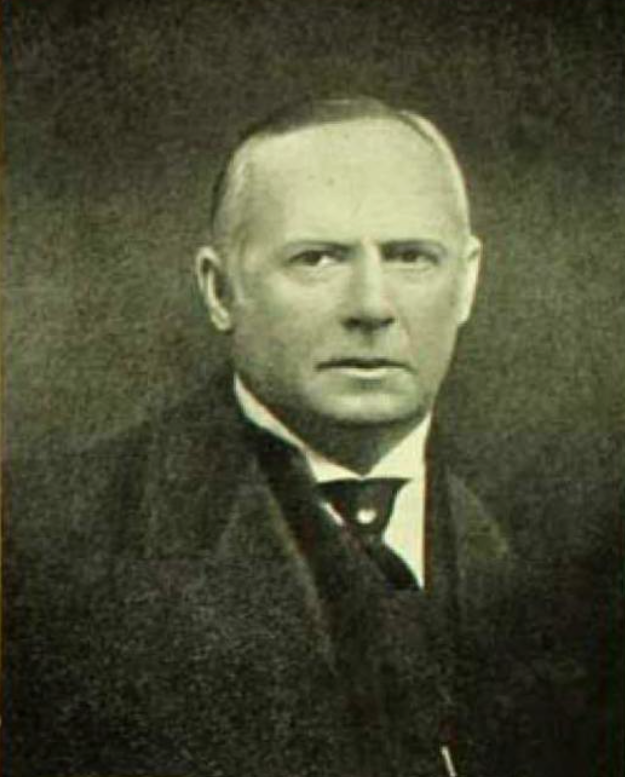
Thomas Raleigh

Sir Thomas Raleigh, KCSI, KC (2 December 1850 – 8 February 1920) was a British lawyer and academic. A fellow of All Souls College, Oxford since 1876, he was Reader in English Law at the University of Oxford from 1884 to 1896, Registrar of the Privy Council from 1896 to 1899, and Legal Member of Viceroy’s Executive Council in India from 1899 to 1904. He was Member of the Council of India from 1909 to 1913.

He was appointed an English King's Counsel in 1908.

In India, he was Vice-Chancellor of the University of Calcutta and chaired the Indian Universities Commission of 1902.
