= Alfred Chichele Plowden =

English police magistrate (1844–1914)

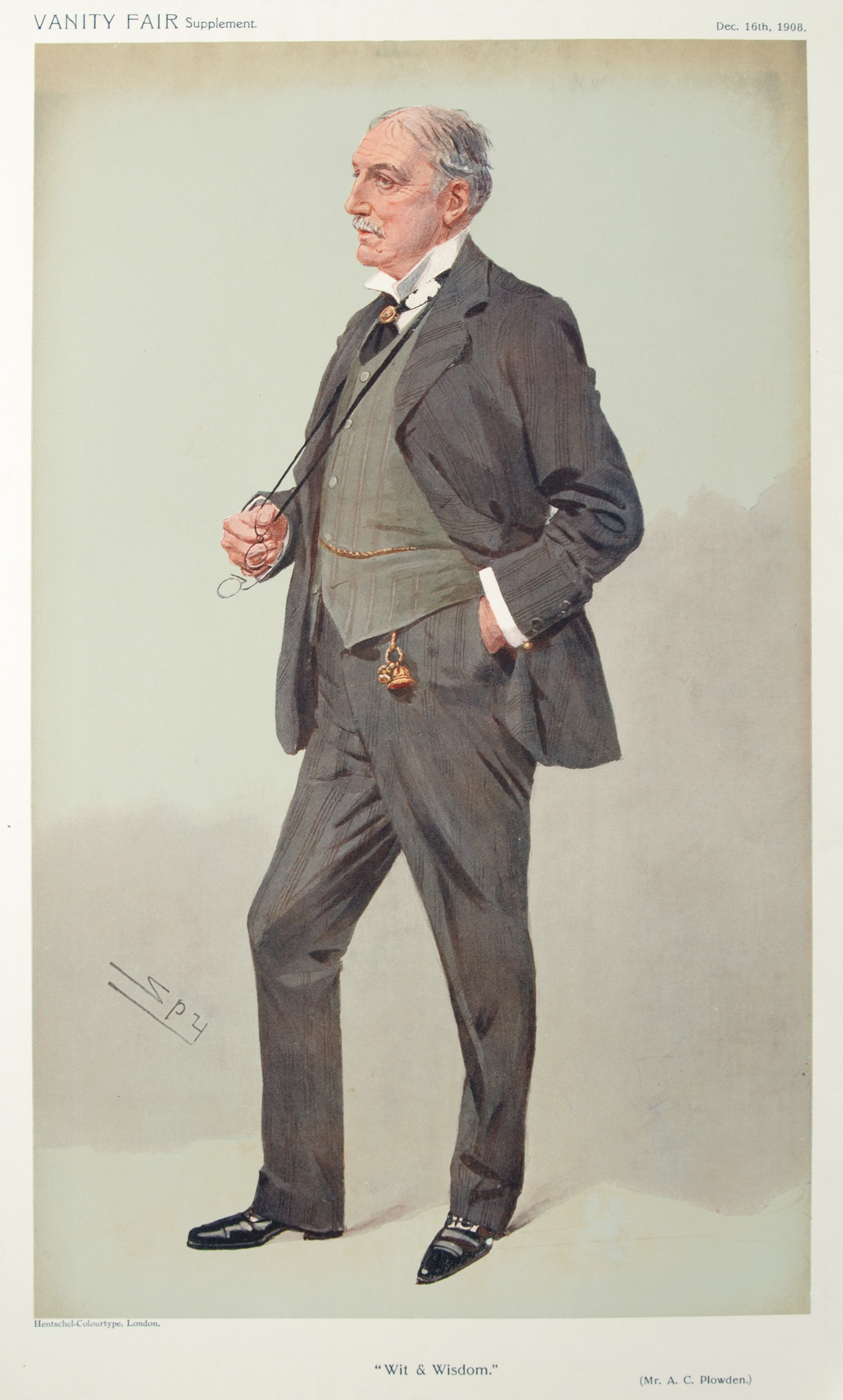
"Wit and Wisdom". Caricature of Alfred Chichele Plowden by Spy in Vanity Fair, 16 December 1908

Alfred Chichele Plowden (21 October 1844, Meerut, British India – 8 August 1914, South Kensington) was an English barrister and Metropolitan Police magistrate of the Marlborough Street Magistrates Court. He wrote an autobiography which was published in 1903 by T. Fisher Unwin.

Alfred Chichele Plowden was the elder son of Trevor John Chichele Plowden (1809–1899) and the elder brother of Sir Trevor John Chichele-Plowden of the Indian Civil Service. Alfred's elder sister Georgina married Sir William Grey. After education at Westminster School, Alfred Plowden matriculated on 12 June 1862 at Brasenose College, Oxford and graduated there B.A. in 1866. From 1866 to 1868 he was private secretary to his uncle Sir John Peter Grant, Governor of Jamaica. Upon his return to England, Alfred Plowden read for the bar and was appointed barrister-at-law in the Middle Temple in 1870. He was recorder of Much Wenlock from 1879 to 1888 and became magistrate at Marlborough Street Magistrates Court in 1888, remaining magistrate there until his death in 1914. He was also a revising barrister in Oxfordshire from 1882 to 1888.

In the summer of 1883 at the Anglican St. Michael's Church, Chester Square in Chester Square he married his cousin Evelyn Foster, daughter of General Sir Charles Foster. Upon his death Alfred Plowden was survived by his widow, two sons, and a daughter.
