= Muriel Jaeger =

British novelist

- Born: 23 May 1892; Barnsley, Yorkshire, England
- Died: 21 November 1969; Tunbridge Wells, Kent, England
- Citizenship: British
- Education: Somerville College, Oxford
- Occupation: Writer
- Writing career
- Language: English
- Years active: 1920-1967
- Genre: science fiction
- Notable works: The Man with Six Senses (1927), Hermes Speaks (1933)

Muriel Jaeger (23 May 1892 – 21 November 1969) was a British author who wrote early novels of science fiction as well as plays and non-fiction.

== Early life and education ==
Jaeger was born in Barnsley, Yorkshire, in 1892, the daughter of John Edward Jagger, an accountant, and was educated at Sheffield, and won a scholarship to Somerville College, Oxford, Oxford, in 1912. Jaeger attended Somerville College, Oxford from 1912 to 1916 and graduated with second-class honours in 1916. At Oxford, Jaeger belonged to a society of women writers that included Winifred Holtby and her close friend Dorothy L. Sayers. Her nickname in college was James, or Jim, or even Jimmy: her friend Dorothy L. Sayers would address her in all three ways.

After graduation in 1916, Jaeger did war work at the Statistics department at the Ministry of Food.

== Writing career ==
In 1920, Jaeger began writing for Time and Tide, a feminist journal, and Vogue before setting out on an independent writing career.

Jaeger's four novels dealt with such topics as extrasensory perception, utopian speculation, and genetic engineering and are considered important for their place in the history of science fiction. Her first science fiction novel, The Question Mark, was published in 1926, depicting a protagonist who woke after many generations to find himself in a seemingly utopian Britain of 200 years hence. The Question Mark evolved the concept of dystopian fiction originated by writers such as H. G. Wells, predating and possibly informing such works as Huxley's Brave New World (1932) and George Orwell's Nineteen Eighty-Four (1949).

In 1927, Jaeger wrote her second novel the Man with Six Senses about a weakly youth Michael, endowed with unrefined psychic talents, who was helped towards maturity by his sympathetic girlfriend, Hilda. In 1929, Jaeger's first non-fiction book Sisyphus: Or, the Limits of Psychology was published. After a six-year gap in her fiction work, Jaeger's third novel Hermes Speaks was published in 1933 and explored the consequences of following the prophecies of a preternaturally intelligent child groomed into becoming a fake medium. Jaeger's fourth and final novel Retreat From Armageddon was published in 1936 and was a future war novel featuring a group of people who withdraw from a clearly named World War II to a remote country house where they philosophise upon the humankind's shortcomings; the novel was notable for its advocacy of genetic engineering. Retreat From Armageddon was not well received by critics and Jaeger abandoned her fiction career before World War II.

Though critical response and limited sales ultimately led her to stop publishing, Jaeger made her mark with dynamic critiques of modern Western civilization and brought a unique voice to the struggles of subjectivity and scientific reason that shook the post-Victorian mindset.

Jaeger continued her writing career beyond fiction. She wrote plays including The Sanderson soviet; a comedy in three acts (1934). She also wrote many non-fiction books including popular history and biographies such as Sisyphus: Or, the Limits of Psychology (1929), Experimental lives from Cato to George Sand (1932), Wars of Ideas (1942), Liberty versus equality (1945), Shepherd's trade (1965), and Before Victoria : changing standards and behaviour, 1787-1837 (1967).

Jaeger never married and died in Tunbridge Wells, Kent, in November 1969.

== Works ==
- The Question Mark (fiction, 1926)
- The Man with Six Senses (fiction, 1927)
- Sisyphus: Or, the Limits of Psychology (non-fiction, 1929)
- Experimental lives from Cato to George Sand (non-fiction, 1932)
- Hermes Speaks (fiction, 1933)
- The Sanderson soviet; a comedy in three acts (play, 1934)
- Retreat from Armageddon (fiction, 1936)
- Wars of Ideas (non-fiction, 1942)
- Liberty versus equality (non-fiction, 1945)
- Shepherd's trade (non-fiction, 1965)
- Before Victoria : changing standards and behaviour, 1787-1837 (nonfiction, 1967)
