= William Watson (physicist, born 1868) =

English physicist (1868–1919)

William Watson CMG, FRS (4 August 1868 – 3 March 1919) was a British physicist and Lieutenant-Colonel in World War I.

After education at King's College School, Watson studied under Arthur William Rucker and C. V. Boys at the Royal College of Science and received his bachelor's degree in 1890. At the Royal College of Science, Watson was appointed demonstrator in physics in 1890, assistant professor in 1897, and professor in 1915. He was elected a Fellow of the Royal Society in 1901.

At the beginning of his career, Watson was an assistant to Professors A. W. Rucker and Thomas Edward Thorpe in the great magnetic survey of the British Isles from 1890 to 1895. He assisted C. V. Boys in radio-micrometer experiments, in timing the periodicity of spark generators' electrical discharges, and in photographing the flight of bullets. He worked with J. W. Rodger in investigating the magnetic rotation of the plane of polarisation in liquids. He designed and built self-recording magnetographs which were used at Kew, Eskdalemuir, and other observatories. His textbooks of physics, Textbook of Physics, Intermediate Physics, and Practical Physics, became popular and were widely used.

As a member of the Expert and Technical Committee of the Royal Automobile Club, Watson created specially designed instruments to investigate and develop the petrol motor. He assisted W. de W. Abney in experiments on colour vision.

Upon the poison gas attacks in April 1915, Watson was sent to France to experiment with defensive countermeasures and in May 1915 made the first Allied experiments on a gas-cloud in the field. In June 1915, the British Army established the Central Laboratory with Watson as director. He was personally involved in the systematic collection and examination of the German shells and fuses used for the gas attacks. During these field investigations he was frequently gassed with a variety of poisons. In the last great gas attack of the war, Watson was a victim and eventually succumbed in hospital. He is commemorated on the war memorial at Golders Green Crematorium.

In addition to the Royal Automobile Club, Watson was a member of the Savile Club.
