= Richardson Evans =

British civil servant, journalist and author

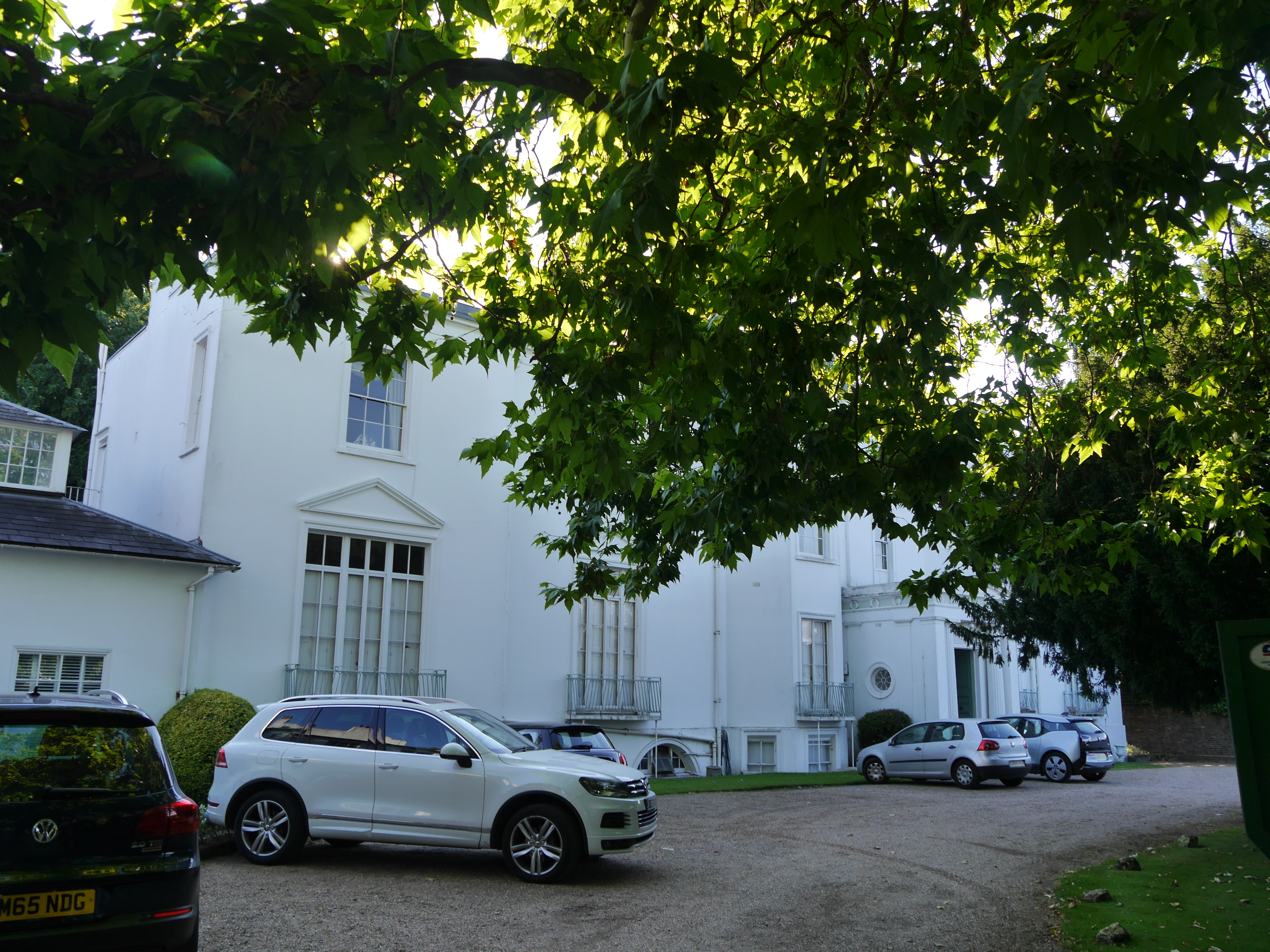
The Kier, 2016

Richardson Evans (5 April 1846 – 10 May 1928) was a British civil servant, journalist and author.

Evans served in the Indian Civil Service, for the North-Western Provinces from 1867 to 1876, after which he worked in London as a journalist.

From the 1880s onwards, Evans campaigned to limit advertising in the fields alongside railway lines; to save the view of the Thames from Richmond Hill, and similar causes. In October 1890 the National Review carried an article by him entitled "The Age of Disfigurement". It was a vigorous attack on the various abuses which had arisen through the indiscriminate use of posters and advertising signs, which he believed ‘are efficacious very often in proportion to the annoyance they cause’. Evans believed there should be regulation, allowing local bodies to control advertising, ‘to schedule scenes of remarkable beauty or interest and to protect them from desecration by a general Act’, to tax posters and to boycott goods which were ‘offensively advertised’.

Evans lived at The Kier, on the west side of Wimbledon Common. In 1903 he was the principal founder of the John Evelyn Club, now known as the Wimbledon Society, and was its secretary until 1920. He was also a founding member of the Wimbledon 1914 Choral Society, now the Wimbledon Choral Society, and its first president, until 1919.

The Richardson Evans Memorial Playing Fields (REMPF), at Putney Vale beside Wimbledon Common, are named in his honour. ‘Nature provides the best memorial’ is part of the inscription on the war memorial within the Playing Fields, designed in 1921 by Madeline Agar, assisted by Brenda Colvin.

There is also a memorial plaque on Owler Tor in the Peak District with the inscription 'This viewpoint and 25 acres around forming part of the Longshaw Estate are given in memory of Richardson Evans 1846–1928' and a quotation is from "The Children’s Song" from Puck of Pook's Hill by Rudyard Kipling. Reporting the ceremony handing over the Deeds of Longshaw to the National Trust on 27 June, the Sheffield Telegraph wrote:
‘A part of the estate, covering 25 acres, consisting of Owler Tor, a view-point near the Hathersage Road, and surrounding Land, will always be a memorial to the late Mr Richardson Evans, a pioneer in the work of preserving natural beauty, and a founder of the Scapa Society, his widow having given £500 to the fund on condition that his name was associated with it in this way.’ (Sheffield Daily Telegraph 29 June 1931). The Scapa Society (Society for Checking the Abuses in Public Advertising) was ‘the first organized reaction against advertising’.
