= Indian Universities Commission 1902 =

Government body

The Indian Universities Commission was a body appointed in 1902 on the instructions of Viceroy of India Lord Curzon intended to make recommendations for reforms in university education in India. Appointed following a conference on education at Simla in September 1901, the commission was led by Law member Thomas Raleigh and included among its members Syed Hussain Belgrami, future Justice Sir C. Sankaran Nair, and Justice Gooroodas Banerjee. The recommendations of the commission included regulations for reformation of University Senates in Indian Universities, greater representation of affiliated colleges in the senates, and stricter monitoring of affiliated institutions by the universities. It also made recommendations for reform of school education, curricular reforms at universities, recommendations on education and examinations, research, as well as student welfare and state scholarships. The recommendations were, however, controversial at the time. There was a growing nationalist sentiment in British India, and a number of colleges and institutions of higher education had risen in metropolitan suburbs which were linked to the major universities of Calcutta, Bombay and Madras. These set their own curriculum, and the recommendations of the commission were seen as measures to derecognize and regulate indigenous institutions which fell into disfavour of the Raj. Despite strong and sustained opposition from Indian populace, the recommendations were enacted by Curzon as Indian Universities Act 1904.

== See also ==
- English Education Act 1835
- Wood's despatch
- National Council of Education

== Notes and references ==
=== References ===
- Jayapalan, N (2005), History of Education in India, Atlantic Publishers & Distributors, ISBN 8171569226.
- Krishnaswamy, N; Krishnaswamy, L (2006), The Story of English in India, Foundation Books, ISBN 8175963123.
