= Thomas Watts Eden =

British obstetric physician (1863–1946)

Thomas Watts Eden FRCOG (8 May 1863 – 22 September 1946) was a British medical doctor. He was consulting obstetric physician to Charing Cross Hospital and consulting surgeon to both Queen Charlotte's Hospital and the Chelsea Hospital for Women. During the First World War he served as a major with the Royal Army Medical Corps. He was a founding fellow of the Royal College of Obstetricians and Gynaecologists.

He was President of the Royal Society of Medicine for 1930–32.

A fellowship in his name is awarded by the Royal College of Physicians.

== Selected publications ==
- Manual of Midwifery (1906)
- Manual of Gynaecology (1911)
- Gynaecology for Students and Practitioners (1916) (with Cuthbert Lockyer)
- The New System of Gynaecology. (1917) (with Cuthbert Lockyer)
