= Beautiful World (Paul Carrack album) =

Studio album by Paul Carrack
- Released: 1997
- Studios: Haflaga Studios and The Pierce Rooms (London, UK)
- Genres: Pop rock; soft rock
- Length: 46:31
- Label: Ark 21
- Producers: Gary Wallis; Toby Chapman

Paul Carrack chronology
Blue Views (1996)	Beautiful World (1997)	Satisfy My Soul (2000)

Beautiful World is the sixth solo studio album by the English singer-songwriter Paul Carrack, then a member of the supergroup Mike + The Mechanics. It was originally released in 1997 on the Ark 21 label.

Album co-producer Gary Wallis was the drummer for Mike + The Mechanics at the time the album was issued, though he was at that juncture a session player and not an official member of the Mechanics. Wallis would join the revived version of Mike + The Mechanics as an official member in 2011, long after Carrack had left that group.

The album was a minor chart entry on the UK album charts, reaching #88. The album's associated single, "The Way I'm Feeling Tonight", peaked at #84 UK.

== Reception ==
Professional ratings
Review scores
Source	Rating
AllMusic	3/5 stars

AllMusic's Stephen Thomas Erlewine writes: "Beautiful World is a thoroughly enjoyable collection of polished, mature pop-soul that is another fine addition to Paul Carrack's catalog."

== Track listing ==
No.	Title	Writer(s)	Length
1.	"The Way I'm Feeling Tonight"	Paul Carrack, Graham Gouldman	4:38
2.	"Time To Let Go"	Carrack	5:14
3.	"Beautiful World"	Carrack, T-Bone Wolk	5:29
4.	"Perfect Love"	Carrack	4:07
5.	"You Give Me Something"	Carrack	3:58
6.	"Satisfied"	Carrack, Toby Chapman	4:19
7.	"Close To Me"	Carrack	5:04
8.	"It Goes Without Saying"	Carrack, Chuck Cannon, Maia Sharp	4:57
9.	"If You'd Ever Needed Someone"	Carrack, Chapman	4:44
10.	"Some Kinda Love"	Carrack, Greg Wells, Mark Hudson	3:42

== Personnel ==
Credits are adapted from the album's liner notes.

- Paul Carrack – vocals, keyboards, Hammond organ
- Toby Chapman – keyboards, additional programming, backing vocals
- Tim Renwick – guitars
- Dave Bronze – bass, backing vocals
- Gary Wallis – drums, drum programming, additional programming
- Mark Feltham – harmonica solo (6)
- Tessa Niles – backing vocals (1–7, 9, 10)
- Tommy Blaize – backing vocals (3)
- Claudia Fontaine – backing vocals (3)
- Beverley Skeete – backing vocals (3)
- Paul Williamson – backing vocals (3)

== Production ==
- Steve Tannett – A&R
- Toby Chapman – producer
- Gary Wallis – producer
- Andy Jackson – recording engineer, mix engineer (8)
- André Horstmann – assistant mix engineer (8)
- John Brough – mix engineer (1–7, 9–12)
- Ray Staff – mastering at Whitfield Street Studios (London, UK)
- John Carver – art direction, chair
- The Leisure Process Studio – sleeve design
- Miles Copeland III – management
- Simon Watson – management
