= Scapa Society =

- Society for Checking the Abuses in Public Advertising
- Formation: 1893
- Founder: Richardson Evans

The Scapa Society (Society for Checking (or Controlling) the Abuses in Public Advertising) was an organization founded in Britain in 1893 to protest against the burgeoning advertising business. It was founded by Richardson Evans, and has been called "the first organised reaction against advertising"

Its early members included William Morris, Rudyard Kipling, William Holman Hunt, Arthur Quiller-Couch and John Everett Millais. Morris's last public speech before his death, in 1896, was at a meeting of the society. He spoke of the general lack of concern for environmental issues: "We have to remember that the enormous majority of the people of the country do not care one straw about natural beauty".

The society published a journal A Beautiful World from 1893 until at least 1922. Its work helped bring about the Advertisements Regulation Act 1907, which controlled structures over 12 feet (3.7 m) tall in areas of natural beauty.

By 1933 it had changed its name to The SCAPA Society for the Prevention of Disfigurement in Town and Country, and produced a report on the disposal of domestic refuse in the countryside, in conjunction with the Women's Institutes. It later became the Advisory Council for the Control of Outdoor Advertising.
