= All I Want (E'voke song) =

Single by E'voke
- Released: 10 November 2013
- Genre: House
- Length: 6:07
- Label: Pinball Records
- Songwriters: Barry Leng & Duncan Hannant
- Producers: Barry Leng & Duncan Hannant

"All I Want" is a single by the duo E'voke released on 10 November 2013.

== Release ==
Following the re-releases of "Arms Of Loren" and "Runaway" Pinball Records announced that new E'voke singles would be released in 2013. In February 2013 three 'new' tracks by E'voke were out onto Pinball Records SoundCloud page; "All I Want", "When Love Breaks Down" and "First Time Last Time" listed as "new tracks for potential remix". All three tracks were unreleased demos recorded during the 1990s as Marlaine Gordon and Kerry Potter had not recorded together since Marlaine's solo single "Step Away" in 2000.

In June 2013 the demos were taken off the SoundCloud page and it was announced that "All I Want" would be the next single - the first E'voke single that was not a re-release since 1999. Clips of the Thomas Gandey (Cagedbaby) mix and Juan Kidd mix were previewed before the release date was finally announced for 10 November 2013. All eight 2013 remixes were posted in full on SoundCloud for fans to listen to for a week in October 2013. The track made number 19 on Music Week's Cool Cuts Chart in September 2013

== Versions ==
- Original Mix 6:07
- Thomas Gandey (Cagedbaby) Radio Edit 3:34
- Thomas Gandey (Cagedbaby) Club Mix 6:23
- Thomas Gandey (Cagedbaby) Dub Mix 6:18
- Thomas Gandey Deep House Vox 7:40
- Thomas Gandey Deep House Dub 7:39
- Juan Kidd Vox 6:38
- Juan Kidd Dub 6:38
- Mike Delinquent Project Rmx 5:11
