= Simon Fenton =

British actor

- Born: 10 June 1976 (age 50); London, England
- Occupation: Actor
- Years active: 1988–2002
- Notable work: Through the Dragon's Eye

Simon Fenton (born 10 June 1976) is an English actor who has appeared in several television roles.

== Career ==
One of his earliest roles was in Tom's Midnight Garden. He appeared in the ITV children's series T-Bag and the Sunstones of Montezuma, Through The Dragon's Eye, and the Russell T Davies series Century Falls. He appeared in the movie The Power of One as the 12-year-old protagonist P.K., a role for which he was nominated for a Young Artist Awards in the category "Best Young Actor Co-starring in a Motion Picture".

In 1993, he appeared with John Goodman in the quirky American comedy Matinee, in a role playing an American boy. In 1994, he played Luke in the Channel 4 miniseries The Rector's Wife. More recently, he was in Band of Brothers and The Bill.

== Filmography ==
=== Film ===
| Year | Title | Role | Notes |
|---|---|---|---|
| 1992 | The Power of One | P.K. Age 12 | Nominated - Young Artist Award |
| 1993 | Matinee | Gene Loomis | |

=== Television ===
| Year | Title | Role | Notes |
|---|---|---|---|
| 1989 | Tom's Midnight Garden | Peter Long | 6 episodes |
| 1989 | Through The Dragon's Eye | Scott Bates | 10 episodes |
| 1991 | The Bill | Youth at Council Estate | Episode: "Closing the Net" |
| 1992 | T-Bag and the Sunstones of Montezuma | Tom Sawyer | Episode: "Gone Fishing" |
| 1993 | Century Falls | Ben Naismith | 6 episodes |
| 1994 | The Rector's Wife | Luke Bouverie | 4 episodes |
| 1994 | The Bill | Jamie Perkins | Episode: "One of Them" |
| 1994-1995 | Chris Cross | Chris Hilton | 13 episodes |
| 1995 | Castles | Paul Castle | 24 episodes |
| 1995 | The Bill | Terry Elkins | Episode: "Three in a Row" |
| 1997 | Grange Hill | Liam | 4 episodes |
| 1997 | Soldier Soldier | Steven Harrison | Episode: "How Was It for You?" |
| 1998 | A Knight in Camelot | Clarence | Television Film |
| 1999 | Harbour Lights | Richard | Episode: "Prince Charming" |
| 2000 | Hearts and Bones | Eddie | Episode: "There Is a Light That Never Goes Out" |
| 2000 | Starhunter | Billy Ray | Episode: "The Man Who Sold The World" |
| 2001 | The Bill | Micky Wallace | Episode: "A Week of Nights" |
| 2001 | Band of Brothers | Gerald J. Lorraine | Episode: "Day of Days" |
| 2002 | The Bill | Joey Bradshaw | 2 episodes |

== Awards and nominations ==
| Year | Award | Category | Nominated work | Result |
|---|---|---|---|---|
| 1992 | Young Artist Award | Best Young Actor Co-Starring in a Motion Picture | The Power of One | Nominated |
