= Marlaine Gordon =

British actress

- Occupation: Actress
- Known for: Through the Dragon's Eye; EastEnders (1995–1996)

Marlaine Gordon is a British actress.

== Acting career ==
One of Gordon's first roles was playing Amanda Jackson in Through The Dragon's Eye (1989), an educational children's programme made for BBC Two's Look and Read productions.

One of her most notable television credits was playing Aisha Pinnock in the BBC sitcom Us Girls (1992), but she is most famous for playing the role of Lydia, the bubbly girlfriend of Steve Elliot (Mark Monero), in the popular BBC soap opera EastEnders (1995–1996).

== Music career ==
Marlaine was in a girl band called E'voke.

== Personal life ==
In 2001 Gordon's boyfriend Martin Rimmer, a soldier with the Queen's Guard, died in the corridor of his barracks following a forbidden alcohol binge with his colleagues. The cause of death given was inhalation of vomit in association with acute alcoholic poisoning.
