= All I Want =

All I Want may refer to:

== Music ==
=== Albums ===
- All I Want (PSD album)
- All I Want (The Reverb Junkie album)
- All I Want (Tim McGraw album)

=== Songs ===
- "All I Want" (702 song)
- "All I Want" (A Day to Remember song)
- "All I Want" (Captain Hollywood Project song)
- "All I Want" (E'voke song)
- "All I Want" (Howard Jones song)
- "All I Want" (Kodaline song)
- "All I Want" (Melissa Tkautz song)
- "All I Want" (Mis-Teeq song)
- "All I Want" (The Offspring song)
- "All I Want" (Olivia Rodrigo song)
- "All I Want" (Sarah Blasko song)
- "All I Want" (Skunk Anansie song)
- "All I Want" (Toad the Wet Sprocket song)
- "All I Want (For Christmas)", a 2019 song by Liam Payne
- "All I Want", by B.o.B from Underground Luxury
- "All I Want", by Chris Brown featuring Tyga from Indigo
- "All I Want", by The Cure from Kiss Me, Kiss Me, Kiss Me
- "All I Want", by Disney from Song of the South
- "All I Want", by Doro from Angels Never Die
- "All I Want", by Echo & The Bunnymen from Heaven Up Here
- "All I Want", by Joni Mitchell from Blue
- "All I Want", by LCD Soundsystem from This Is Happening
- "All I Want", by The Lightning Seeds from Cloudcuckooland
- "All I Want", by The Mekons from I Love Mekons
- "All I Want", by Puressence from Only Forever
- "All I Want", by Ride from Weather Diaries
- "All I Want", by Saigon Kick from The Lizard
- "All I Want", by Sizzla from Soul Deep
- "All I Want", by Staind from The Illusion of Progress
- "All I Want", by Wet Wet Wet from The Greatest Hits
- "All I Want", by Younger Brother from The Last Days of Gravity

== Other uses ==
- All I Want (film), a 2002 coming-of-age dramedy
- All I Want (Rufus Wainwright DVD)
- All I Want (art exhibition), an exhibition of the work of 40 Portuguese women held in 2021
