= E'voke =

- Origin: United Kingdom
- Genres: Pop, dance, Europop
- Years active: 1994–1999, 2002, 2012–present
- Labels: FFRR, Frreedom, Manifesto, Pulse8, WEA, Inferno Records, Pinball Records

E'voke were a British female vocal duo from the mid-1990s, who had several club and chart hits in the UK and are best known for their 1996 single "Arms of Loren". The two members – Marlaine Gordon and Kerry Potter – both went to the Sylvia Young Theatre School and upon graduating went on to star in the BBC sitcom, Us Girls. Gordon also went on to appear in EastEnders between 1994 and 1995 playing the part of Lydia. Evoke also means to bring or recall. Another meaning is invoke.

== Career ==
In 1994, they released their first single on the FFRR label, a dance cover version of Stevie Wonder's "I Believe". Although it was not a commercial hit, it did fairly well in the clubs and featured on Direct-Hit remix service. The track was produced by Barry Leng and Duncan Hannant who went on to write E'voke's original hits.

In late 1995, they released the track "Runaway" on Frreedom Records which reached number 30 in the UK Singles Chart in November. In 1996, E'voke scored their biggest commercial and club hit with "Arms of Loren". Two mixes were created. The Steinway mix, which is still played today in clubs, being the more commercial and the Nip N Tuck mix being the main radio edit. Once again, the song was released on a different record label – Manifesto Records. The track reached number 25 in the UK chart in August 1996.

In early 1998, a new E'voke record was released (this time on Pulse8), being a dance cover of John Waite's "Missing You". However, due to the closing of Pulse8, the song's release was delayed, and was picked up by another record label – WEA. However, it was not released until early 1999, the track was not a hit, and the E'voke concept was dropped.

== Post break-up ==
Gordon went on to try to launch a solo career in 2000, recording the track "Step Away" written by her old E'voke producers, and featuring Potter as a backing vocalist. The track was never released.

In 2001, the head of Inferno Records, played "Arms of Loren" to DJ Ferry Corsten. Corsten created his own remix to the track, basing it on the Nip N Tuck mix from the 1996 release. Issued in February 2002 (with a video featuring Potter and an unknown blonde model miming to Marlaine's parts) the track charted at number 31 – six places lower than the original version.

Since then, Potter has appeared in Casualty and the film, The League of Gentlemen's Apocalypse.

In 2006, AATW Records licensed "Arms of Loren" and commissioned several new remixes by Love To Infinity, Dancing DJ's and Kenny Hayes. The remixes were ultimately unreleased.

== Further remixes and debut album ==
In late 2011, Pinball Records licensed "Arms of Loren" and commissioned new remixes by Thomas Gandey (under his Cagedboy alias), Rudedog and Dehasse. The E'voke CD single back catalogue was released digitally along with the videos for "Runaway", "Missing You" and the 2002 mix of "Arms of Loren". The new remixes of "Arms of Loren" were released on 15 April 2012. In September 2012, new remixes of "Runaway" were released with Pinball announcing two brand new singles from an E'voke album due for release in 2013.

In 2013, three new tracks were previewed on Pinball Records SoundCloud page; "All I Want", "When Love Breaks Down" and "First Time Last Time". The tracks, most likely demos from the 1990s (as neither Marlaine or Kerry had recorded any new material since Marlaine's attempted solo career) were labelled as new tunes for potential remix. It was later announced that "All I Want" would be the song chosen to be a single (the first 'new' E'voke single since "Missing You" in early 1999) and was released on 10 November 2013. Further singles and an album were announced to be released in 2014 by Pinball Records but nothing surfaced.

== Discography ==
=== Singles ===
- 1994: "I Believe"
- 1995: "Runaway"
- 1996: "Arms of Loren"
- 1998: "Missing You"
- 2013: "All I Want"
