= David Collings =

English actor (1940–2020)

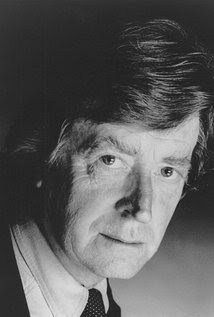
- Born: 4 June 1940; Brighton, Sussex, England
- Died: 23 March 2020 (aged 79)
- Occupation: Actor
- Years active: 1961–2019
- Children: 3, including Samuel Collings

David Collings (4 June 1940 – 23 March 2020) was an English actor. In an extensive career he appeared in many roles on stage, television, film and radio, as well as various audio books, voiceovers, concert readings and other work. He garnered a following through his numerous appearances in cult sci-fi series such as Doctor Who, Sapphire & Steel and Blake's 7, as well as dubbing the titular character in the series Monkey and Legolas in the classic BBC Radio 4 adaptation of Tolkien's The Lord of the Rings.

== Biography ==
Collings was born in Brighton on 4 June 1940.

=== Film and television ===
Collings's screen breakthrough came playing the protagonist Raskolnikov in Fyodor Dostoyevsky's Crime & Punishment (1964 with Associated-Rediffusion Television). The production was broadcast live. He has played historical characters such as Percy Grainger in Ken Russell's Song of Summer (1968), Richard Simmons in The Shadow of the Tower (1972), John Ruskin in The Love School (1975), a BBC series about the Pre-Raphaelites, and Sir Anthony Babington in Elizabeth R. In 1975, he portrayed William Wilberforce in The Fight Against Slavery, and he starred as William Pitt in Prince Regent in 1979.

Collings also appeared as Deva in the final episode of Blake's 7 and as the character of 'Silver' in several episodes of Sapphire & Steel TV adventures. He appeared in the TV series Danger Man, Mystery and Imagination, UFO (episode "The Psychobombs") and Gideon's Way; in the last, he played an emotionally disturbed man attacking young women in the episode "The Prowler".

Collings played the character of Bob Cratchit in the classic 1970 film musical, Scrooge, starring alongside Albert Finney, Dame Edith Evans, Sir Alec Guinness, Kenneth More, Anton Rodgers and others. In 1981 he played the dual roles of Lord Dark and The Friendly Ghost in the perennial school-children's favourite Dark Towers, part of the Look and Read series. He voiced the eponymous lead for the long-running hit Japanese television series Journey to the West, released in English-speaking countries as Monkey. The show was a hit and had a mass following, particularly with young people. He is also noted for his children's television appearances including the role of Julian Oakapple in Midnight is a Place (1977). In 1989 he played Charn (the villain) in Through the Dragon's Eye, and had a recurring role as the headmaster in Press Gang from 1989 to 1993.

=== Doctor Who ===
He has appeared a number of times in the long-running British science fiction television series Doctor Who, including Vorus in Revenge of the Cybermen, Poul in The Robots of Death and Mawdryn in the serial Mawdryn Undead. He has also played an alternate Doctor in the audio plays by Big Finish Productions in the Doctor Who Unbound series, Full Fathom Five, alongside other Doctor Who audio credits. Collings returned to the role of Poul, now named Paulus, in the episode Hidden Persuaders of the audio drama series Kaldor City and in Big Finish Productions' The Robots series, now named Poul again.

In the 2010s, Collings narrated four Doctor Who audiobooks: the "Past Doctor Adventures" titles Corpse Marker and The Witch Hunters, and the novelisations of Mawdryn Undead and Scream of the Shalka.

=== Radio ===
On radio, he portrayed Legolas in the classic BBC Radio 4 adaptation of The Lord of the Rings.

He was Mr Carlyle in Radio 4's seven-episode serial dramatisation of East Lynne by Mrs Henry Wood, first broadcast in June 1987.

=== Theatre ===
Collings was described by The Stage as a "stalwart of the National and RSC". His career on stage began with seasons at the Liverpool Rep and subsequently took him all over the world with leading companies including Cheek by Jowl, as well as BAM and the Lincoln Center in New York.

He has had a long theatre career appearing in various productions in the UK, US and globally, ranging from Shakespeare and his contemporaries, classical works, Restoration dramas and farce, through to contemporary classics and new plays. He played the parts of Mortimer the Elder and Matrevis in a production of Edward II at the Royal Exchange, Manchester, which also featured his son, the actor Samuel Collings. He also appeared as the King of France in Henry V, and finally Giles Corey in The Crucible at the same venue.

== Personal life ==
He died aged 79, on 23 March 2020.

== Filmography ==
Year	Title	Role	Notes
1966	A Man for All Seasons	Kings Messenger	Uncredited
1968	Joanna	Critic	Uncredited
1970	Scrooge	Bob Cratchit	
1972	For the Love of Ada	Mr. Johnson	
1974	Mahler	Hugo Wolfe	
1975	Hennessy	Covey	
1978	The Thirty Nine Steps	Tillotson	
1980	The Outsider	Maj. Nigel Percival	
2010	Mission London	Dean Carver	
2013	The Invisible Woman	Governor	

== Television ==
Year	Title	Role	Notes
1964-1967	ITV Play of the Week	Various	3 episodes
1965	The Wednesday Play	"Taffy" Thomas	Episode: "Moving On"
1965	Gideon's Way	Alan Campbell-Gore	Episode: "The Prowler"
1965	Danger Man	Stephen Miller	Episode: "Sting in the Tail"
1965	Z-Cars	Howard	Episode: "With a Pin"
1965	Knock on Any Door	Walke/Ted Besant	2 episodes
1966	Softly, Softly	Lloyd	Episode: "The Key"
1966	The Troubleshooters	Roy Binns	Episode: "Wingless Wonder"
1966	No Hiding Place	Harry Nelson	Episode: "The Smoker"
1966	Emergency Ward 10	Gareth Owen	Episode: "The Long Small Hours"
1966-1968	Dr. Finlay's Casebook	Roy Douglas/Alan Ramsay	2 episodes
1968	Point Counterpoint	Maurice Spandrell	5 episodes
1967-1990	Omnibus	Various	5 episodes, including Song of Summer
1969	The Possessed	Pyotr Verhovensky	5 episodes
1969	Special Branch	Newspaper Editor	Episode: "Reliable Sources"
1969	Strange Report	John Anders	Episode: "REPORT 4821 X-RAY 'Who weeps for the doctor"
1969-1971	Thirty-Minute Theatre	Various	3 episodes
1970	UFO	Daniel Clak	Episode: "The Psychobombs"
1971	The Mind of Mr.J.G.Reeder	The Hon. Clive Fitzcormorant	Episode: Find The Lady (S2 E7)
1971	Elizabeth R	Sir Anthony Babington	Episode: "Horrible Conspiracies"
1971	Play for Today	Tommy	Episode: "The Man in the Sidecar"
1972	The Shadow of the Tower	Richard Simmons	Episode: "The Schooling of Apes"
1974	Fall of Eagles	Miliukov	2 episodes
1975-1983	Crown Court	Alec Parker/Nigel Warwick	2 serials
1975-1983	Doctor Who	Various	Serials: "Revenge of the Cybermen", "The Robots of Death" and "Mawdryn Undead"
1977	Treasure Island	Dr. Harcourt	2 episodes
1978	The Professionals	Frank Turner	Episode: "Stake Out"
1979-1983	BBC Television Shakespeare	Cassius/Thurio	Episodes: Julius Caesar and The Two Gentlemen of Verona
1980	A Tale of Two Cities	John Barsad	5 episodes
1981	Blake's 7	Deva	Episode: "Blake"
1981-1982	Sapphire & Steel	Silver	2 serials
1983	Juliet Bravo	Paul Pringle	Episode: "Backtrack"
1985	Miss Marple	Reverend Harmon	Serial: "A Murder is Announced"
1989	The Bill	Paul Benton	Episode: "Blood Ties"
1989	Look and Read	Charn	Episode: Through the Dragon's Eye
1989-1993	Press Gang	Mr. Winters	5 episodes
1991	Boon	Detective Inspector	Episode: "Help Me Make It Through the Night"
1993	The Darling Buds of May	Mr. Dawlish	Episode: "The Happiest Days of Your Life Part One"
1994	The Ruth Rendell Mysteries	Michael Sunderton	2 episodes
1995	Screen Two	Mr. Shepherd	Episode: "Persuasion"
2015	Holby City	Linden Hislop	Episode: "Ever After"
