= Through the Dragon's Eye =

- Genre: Children's fantasy
- Written by: Christopher Russell; Christine Russell
- Starring: David Collings; Simon Fenton; Nicola Stewart; Marlaine Gordon; Carolyn Pickles
- Voices of: Sean Barrett; Charles Collingwood
- Composer: Roger Limb
- Country of origin: United Kingdom
- Original language: English
- No. of episodes: 10

Production
- Producer: Sue Weeks
- Running time: 20 minutes

Original release
- Network: BBC2
- Release: 19 September – 28 November 1989

Related
- Look and Read

Through the Dragon's Eye is an educational BBC Look and Read production, which was first aired on BBC2 from 19 September to 28 November 1989. It was repeated several times until 2000 and then shown on digital television between 2002 and 2008. Its plot follows three schoolchildren who are transported to a magical land, which they must save by using their reading skills. The television show was also adapted into a video game for the BBC Micro. A resource pack for the series was released in 1989 with a novel published in 1991.

== Plot ==
The story involves three children, named Jenny, Amanda and Scott, who are painting a mural on a school wall in Acton, London (Through the Dragon's Eye was filmed at Derwentwater Primary School, Shakespeare Road in Acton, London). The dragon in the mural winks at the children and they are transported to a land called Pelamar, where the dragon, named Gorwen, asks the children to undertake a task to save the magical land.

In order to save Pelamar, the children, with Gorwen's help, must recover the pieces of the Veetacore (the life source of Pelamar), which recently exploded. Until they succeed, the land of Pelamar turns increasingly barren and its inhabitants start to fade away. The instructions for the reconstruction of the Veetacore are written in a book, and the children must use their reading skills to help the Veetacore keepers, (Boris, Doris and Morris), thus showing the young audience the importance of reading. The art of reading has been lost in Pelamar – this is a sore point with Doris, but the Veetacore keepers do start learning to read as the series progresses.

Unfortunately, three of the pieces have been thrown into the distant land of Widge, forcing Amanda and Scott to travel to Widge with Gorwen, Boris, and the giant mouse Rhodey in order to find them, leaving Jenny to help determine how to reassemble the Veetacore (made harder both by her own lack of confidence at reading and the fact that the pet caterpillar of Morris, the third keeper, has eaten at some of the pages in the book). The "baddie" of the story is Charn, "The Evil One", who wants to hijack the Veetacore for his own evil purposes, and who is implied to have triggered the original 'explosion' of the Veetacore in the first place.

Fortunately, the inability to read also afflicts Charn, allowing Jenny to display a written message to her friends when Charn forbids her to divulge his presence (She tricked Charn into allowing her to knit a scarf due to the cold of Pelamar, drawing out a pattern that actually spelled out "HELP! CHARN!" without him knowing, which she could then show to the others over a video phone). Although Gorwen is able to defeat Charn, he is dangerously weakened, nearly killing himself before the last Veeton is discovered and the Veetacore restored. Although the show ends with the children returning to their school at apparently the moment they left, the presence of their notebooks and three miniature versions of the Veetons they recovered proves that the experience was genuine.

== Characters and cast ==
- Amanda Jackson (played by Marlaine Gordon): one of the children that is transported to Pelamar, Amanda goes with Boris, Scott, Rodey and Gorwen to try to find the lost Veetons. The most resourceful.
- Jenny (played by Nicola Stewart): the second child who is transported to Pelamar, Jenny stays behind to help Morris and Dorris to read the Book on the Veetacore (none of the Pelamots (the name given to the inhabitants of Pelamar) could read). Jenny is by her own admission not a strong reader, but she gains confidence as the series progresses.
- Scott Bates (played by Simon Fenton): the third child and only boy who is transported to Pelamar, Scott goes with the rescue party to find the lost Veetons. Scott had the idea that Jenny and Amanda should write everything down that happened on a part of his notebook. He wrote his version of events as well.
- Boris (played by Timothy Lyn): the orange Veetacore Keeper who goes with Amanda, Scott, Gorwen and Rodey to try to find the lost Veetons. Boris had a magic cricket bat, which enabled him to fly. Most of the time he came across as not particularly bright, but he occasionally displayed unusual intelligence- he learnt to read well with the help of Scott, and helped Amanda find the first Veeton.
- Doris (played by Carolyn Pickles): the purple Veetacore Keeper, and the only female one who stays behind to help Jenny re-build the Veetacore. Doris is melted by Charn, while she tries to contact Gorwen the Dragon, but is later rescued by Gorwen when he returns to fight Charn. Doris is at first very unwilling to let Jenny help her mend the Veetacore, but softens over the series.
- Morris (played by Michael Heath): the green Veetacore Keeper who stays behind to help Jenny and Doris re-build the Veetacore. Morris has many green pets, including a caterpillar, called Frug who in the last episode turns into a giant butterfly. Morris is more welcoming of Jenny. He is briefly melted by Charn in an attempt to shield Gorwen, but is soon rescued.
- Gorwen the Dragon (voiced by Sean Barrett): Gorwen is a green fire-breathing dragon who contacts Jenny, Scott and Amanda and transports them into Pelamar. Gorwen had already defeated Charn (see below) once before, but in the eighth episode he was forced to fight him again, being dangerously weakened by the fight even though he defeated his enemy.
- Rodey (voiced by Charles Collingwood, puppeteered by Katie Hebb): Rodey was a talking mouse who could transform from the size of a human to normal mouse size at will, though when he enters a "High Fade Zone", as in Episode 1, he shrinks against his will. Rodey could speak Widgen (the language of the Widgets (see below), which was how the Rescue Party communicated with the Widgets.
- Charn "The Evil One" (played by David Collings): Charn was the villain of Through the Dragon's Eye. He looks like a skeletal bird-man, he has long knife-like fingers, and he wears a black cloak. He can discharge an electric force from his hands that would turn his victims into puddles of slime. He had already tried to take over Pelamar once before, but was defeated by Gorwen and banished. When the Veetacore exploded he was able to come back to Pelamar, where he tries to use the Veetacore for his own evil purposes. He did not appear until Episode 5 Jenny complains that the Veetacore house is cold, and we learn that it gets colder as Charn gets nearer. Charn, in the eighth episode, fought Gorwen and was defeated, Gorwen incinerating him despite his own weakened condition.
- The Widgets (played by Peter Bonner, Rusty Goffe, Samantha Burroughs, Willie Coppen, Melanie Dixon, Raymond Griffiths, Peter Mandell, Sandra Nicholson and Katie Purvis): The Widgets were small mischievous squirrel-like creatures who lived in a land called "Widge", next to Pelamar (Widge was where the last three veetons were scattered after the Veetacore exploded). They seem malevolent at first, but in the last episode they inexplicably help Scott get the last Veeton.

== Episodes ==
No.	Title	Directed by	Written by	Original release date
1	"The Dragon from Pelamar"	Unknown	Christoper and Christine Russell	19 September 1989
Three children (Jenny, Scott and Amanda) pass through a mural they have been painting and find themselves in the magical land of Pelamar.
2	"Flight to Widge"	Unknown	Christoper and Christine Russell	26 September 1989
Amanda, Scott, Boris, Rodey and Gorwen set off to find the lost Veetons. Gorwen the Dragon believes that the missing Veetons must have fallen beyond the mountains of Pelamar into the strange land of Widge.
3	"The First Veeton"	Unknown	Christoper and Christine Russell	3 October 1989
With the Widgets as their guides, the search party set off through the Woods of Widge.
4	"Word Magic"	Unknown	Christoper and Christine Russell	10 October 1989
The Widgets have hidden the first Veeton inside a huge book tree. Boris and Amanda manage to unlock it and enter it in search of the Veeton, while Scott and the dragon Gorwen search for Rodey, who is still missing.
5	"Clues in the Snow"	Unknown	Christoper and Christine Russell	17 October 1989
With the help of the veetarod, Scott and Gorwen find Boris, Amanda and the first Veeton in a gravel pit. Scott, Boris and Gorwen find that the Widgets have taken the Veeton and Boris' rucksack, and that they have kidnapped Amanda. Gorwen sets off to find them, while Boris and Scott continue to Ash Rock.
6	"Jenny's Scarf"	Unknown	Christoper and Christine Russell	31 October 1989
Amanda chases the Widget who stole Boris' rucksack, with the Veeton in it. She rescues it and in doing so, finds Rodey, but they find themselves lost in the snow. Boris and Scott find another clue at Ash Rock.
7	"The Waterfall of Words"	Unknown	Christoper and Christine Russell	7 November 1989
During the night, the search party pitch a tent and spend the night at the top of the mountains, until two troublesome Widgets sneak in and steal Boris' map of Widge. They rip the map, leaving Boris, Amanda, Scott and Rodey alone with no "map, no time and no words to help" them. Suddenly, a waterfall of words appears gushing down the mountainside, giving them a clue.
8	"The Great Battle"	Unknown	Christoper and Christine Russell	14 November 1989
Gorwen returns to the Veetacore House, where Charn is waiting for him. Morris tries to warn him, but is zapped by Charn. There is a great battle and Charn is eventually beaten forever; Charn had already been beaten once by Gorwen and as a result was banished from Pelamar.
9	"Danger on High"	Unknown	Christoper and Christine Russell	21 November 1989
Rodey rescues the veetarod, which had fallen down a deep chasm in the tunnel. The veetarod leads them up to the top of the mountain. Rodey rescues the veetarod, which had fallen down a deep chasm in the tunnel. The veetarod leads them up to the top of the mountain.
10	"The Final Page"	Unknown	Christoper and Christine Russell	28 November 1989
Scott, with the help of the Widgets, manages to rescue the last Veeton. Meanwhile, Doris and Morris fit the penultimate piece of the Veetacore and wait for the others to return with the last Veeton.

== Theme tune ==
During the series, three different sets of lyrics (sung to the same theme tune by Derek Griffiths) were used - one at the start of episodes 2-10, another at the end of episodes 2-10 (as well as the end of episode 1), whereas the start of episode 1 used a completely different song.

Lyrics #1 (used at the start of episode 1 and end of episode 5)	Lyrics #2 (used at the start of episodes 2-10 and end of episode 1-4 and 6-10)	Lyrics #3 (used at the end of episodes 2)
North or South, East or West, The Test; Is can you finish what you start, Take Heart! Look bravely through the Dragon's Eye; And fly...	North or South, East or West, The Quest; To save the life of Pelamar; Goes Far. Look bravely through the Dragon's Eye; And fly...	North or South, East or West, It's Best; To know for sure you understand The Plan. Look bravely through the Dragon's Eye; And fly...

== Computer game ==
Through the Dragon's Eye was also available as an educational computer game on the BBC Micro System. The game took the player through various stages of the story, whereby the user was required to use literacy and numeracy skills to solve puzzles.
