= I Believe (When I Fall in Love It Will Be Forever) =

1972 song by Stevie Wonder

Song by Stevie Wonder

from the album Talking Book
- Released: October 27, 1972
- Recorded: Summer 1972
- Genre: Soul
- Length: 4:53
- Label: Tamla
- Composer: Stevie Wonder
- Lyricists: Stevie Wonder; Yvonne Wright
- Producer: Stevie Wonder

Licensed audio
- "I Believe (When I Fall in Love It Will Be Forever)" on YouTube

"I Believe (When I Fall in Love It Will Be Forever)" is a soul song co-written and performed by American singer-songwriter Stevie Wonder and Yvonne Wright, for Wonder's fifteenth studio album, Talking Book (1972).

All vocals and instruments are provided by Wonder: lead vocal, background vocal, piano, Hohner Clavinet, drums and Moog bass.

== George Michael version ==
"I Believe (When I Fall in Love It Will Be Forever)"

Promotional single by George Michael
- Released: February 1992
- Genre: R&B
- Length: 7:01; 4:09 (edit)
- Label: Columbia
- Songwriters: Stevie Wonder; Yvonne Wright
- Producer: George Michael

Licensed audio
- "I Believe (When I Fall in Love It Will Be Forever)" on YouTube

A live recording by British singer-songwriter George Michael was included on a free cassette tape given out to audience members at Michael's Wembley Arena concerts during March 19–23, 1991, and was later released as a B-side of the "Don't Let the Sun Go Down on Me" single in November 1991.

"I Believe (When I Fall in Love It Will Be Forever)" was issued as a promotional single in the United States, and was promoted to urban radio in February 1992. It reached number 90 on the Canadian Top Singles chart. The song was later included on disc two of the 2011 remastered release of Michael's debut studio album, Faith.

=== Critical reception ===
Cash Box wrote that Michael's remake is "a soft, crossover attempt that should take the 'pop topper' to the R&B charts again," while the Black Radio Exclusive opined that Michael does "an admirable job on this cover of a Stevie Wonder classic."

=== Track listing ===
- US promotional CD single (CSK 4429)
1. "I Believe (When I Fall in Love It Will Be Forever)" (edit) – 4:09
2. "I Believe (When I Fall in Love It Will Be Forever)" – 7:01

=== Charts ===
Chart (1992)	Peak position
Canada Top Singles (RPM)	90

== E'voke version ==
"I Believe"

Single by E'voke
- B-side: "It's My Life"
- Released: 1994
- Genre: House
- Length: 5:41
- Label: FFRR; Pinball
- Songwriters: Stevie Wonder; Yvonne Wright
- Producers: Barry Leng; Duncan Hannant

E'voke singles chronology
"I Believe" (1994)	"Runaway" (1995)

This song was also recorded by British female vocal duo E'voke in 1994 as their debut single (with the title being shortened to "I Believe"). A B-side to the track titled "It's My Life" written by E'voke producers Barry Leng and Duncan Hannant was recorded. Though the track was not a commercial hit (it reached number 77 in the UK charts and no video was filmed for the track), it was a club hit and E'voke moved on to FFRR's sister label Ffrreedom for their next single "Runaway". The CD single release of the track was released digitally by Pinball Records in 2011.

=== Critical reception ===
Andy Beevers from the Record Mirror Dance Update wrote, "This cover of the Stevie Wonder song by two 16-year-old girls is an unsubtle pop-house romp produced by Barry Leng who also gave us Rage's 'Run to You'. The main points of interest are the two club mixes from recent dancefloor heroes Tin Tin Out and Tall Paul. The former lifts a couple of choice vocal hooks and drapes them over a galloping house rhythm with sprightly organ and string riffs which individually feature in two excellent breakdowns. The Rock Da House man uses the chorus and the dreamy 'Here I am' vocal snatch over a harder driving production."

=== Versions ===
- Edited version – 4:03
- 12" mix – 5:38
- A Tin Tin Out mix – 7:38
- Tall Paul mix – 6:39
- The Gems for Jem mix – 7:51

=== Charts ===
Chart (1994)	Peak position
Scotland (OCC)	26
UK Singles (Official Charts)	77
UK Dance (OCC)	18
UK Club Chart (Music Week)	19

== Other versions ==
Peter Frampton released his recording of the song in January 1973 on his album Frampton's Camel.

In early 1974, a recording by Songbird was released by Mushroom Records in Canada. This was a studio group consisting of producer Mike Flicker, Howard Leese and Rob Deans, all of whom also worked with Heart. It was the label's first charting single, reaching number 75 on the Canadian chart. Despite its low peak, the single reportedly sold close to 30,000 units.

Colleen Hewett had an Australian single release of the song, titled "I Believe When I Fall in Love", issued in July 1974. Hewett's rendition charted in Australia with a number 51 peak, and was featured on Hewett's album M'Lady.

Art Garfunkel's 1975 album Breakaway opened with "I Believe (When I Fall in Love It Will Be Forever)", in a lush orchestral version produced by Richard Perry.

Mike and the Mechanics covered the song on their 1995 album, Beggar on a Beach of Gold, with Paul Carrack on lead vocals.

Michael McDonald recorded the song for his album Motown, released in 2003.

Josh Groban recorded the song for his album All That Echoes, released in early 2013, and released it as a single that peaked at number 20 on the Adult Contemporary chart.

Father John Misty covered the song on his 2022 EP Live at Electric Lady.

== In popular culture ==
The song is featured in the 2000 comedy-drama film High Fidelity starring John Cusack and Jack Black, and is included on its soundtrack. It was also included in season 1, episode 10 of the 2020 Hulu series also titled High Fidelity starring Zoe Kravitz.
