= The Rector's Wife =

British drama TV miniseries

- Genre: Drama
- Based on: The Rector's Wife by Joanna Trollope
- Written by: Hugh Whitemore
- Directed by: Giles Foster
- Starring: Lindsay Duncan; Jonathan Coy; Miles Anderson; Lucy Dawson; Simon Fenton; Rynagh O'Grady; Ronald Pickup; Gabrielle Lloyd; Madge Hindle; Geoffrey Chater; Carol MacReady; Stephen Dillane; Frederick Treves; Helen Fraser; Prunella Scales
- Composer: Richard Hartley
- Country of origin: United Kingdom
- Original language: English
- No. of series: 1
- No. of episodes: 4

Production
- Executive producer: Alan Shallcross
- Producer: Alan Wright
- Production locations: Witney, Oxfordshire, England, UK
- Cinematography: Witold Stok
- Editor: Dick Allen
- Camera setup: Alan Fawcus
- Running time: 53 minutes
- Production company: Talisman Films Ltd

Original release
- Network: Channel 4
- Release: 3 March – 24 March 1994

The Rector's Wife is a British television drama miniseries, adapted by Hugh Whitemore and directed by Giles Foster from Joanna Trollope's 1991 novel of the same name. It was produced by Talisman Films Ltd for Channel 4 and broadcast over four episodes between 3 and 24 March 1994.

== Plot ==
Anna Bouverie (Lindsay Duncan) has spent 20 years as a clergyman's wife, scrimping and slaving to raise a family, serve God, and work for the parish on limited means. Tired of the financial strain she takes a job at a local supermarket causing additional disturbances in her already shaky marriage, disapproval of the parish, and the sudden interest of three different men.

== Cast ==
- Lindsay Duncan as Anna Bouverie
- Jonathan Coy as Peter Bouverie
- Miles Anderson as Patrick O'Sullivan
- Lucy Dawson as Flora Bouverie
- Simon Fenton as Luke Bouverie
- Rynagh O'Grady as Ella Pringle
- Ronald Pickup as Daniel Byrne
- Gabrielle Lloyd as Isobel Thomson
- Madge Hindle as Elaine Dodswell
- Geoffrey Chater as The Bishop
- Carol MacReady as Celia Harper
- Stephen Dillane as Jonathan Byrne
- Frederick Treves Colonel Richardson
- Helen Fraser as Trish Pardoe
- Prunella Scales as Marjorie Richardson

== Episodes ==
No.	Title	Directed by	Written by	Original release date
1	"Part 1"	Giles Foster	Hugh Whitemore	3 March 1994
Anna Bouverie's husband fails to get promotion to archdeacon. After twenty years of putting husband, God and parish first, Anna decides to take positive action.
2	"Part 2"	Giles Foster	Hugh Whitemore	10 March 1994
Anna's wealthy new neighbour, Patrick, offers her son Luke a job. The village ladies show their disapproval of Anna's job, and Anna finds herself attracted to the Archdeacon's brother, Jonathan.
3	"Part 3"	Giles Foster	Hugh Whitemore	17 March 1994
Anna gets closer to Jonathan, while Luke thinks she's having an affair with Patrick. When Peter finds out that Flora has a free place at St Saviours he tells the supermarket that Anna will be leaving.
4	"Part 4"	Giles Foster	Hugh Whitemore	24 March 1994
After listening to Ella's theories about Anna and Patrick, Peter drives off but crashes into a bus and is killed. At the funeral, Anna is besieged with offers of help, but decides to grab this opportunity for independence.

== Home media ==
The series was originally released on VHS by PolyGram Video on 11 April 1994, and a subsequently released on DVD was made available on 8 October 2018 by Simply Media in the UK. The complete series has since been available to view on All4.
