= A Knight in Camelot =

1998 American television film

- Based on: A Connecticut Yankee in King Arthur's Court by Mark Twain
- Written by: Joe Wiesenfeld
- Directed by: Roger Young
- Starring: Whoopi Goldberg; Simon Fenton; Michael York; Paloma Baeza; Ian Richardson
- Music by: Patrick Williams
- Countries of origin: United States; England; Hungary
- Original language: English

Production
- Producer: Norman Rosemont
- Running time: 90 minutes
- Production companies: The Walt Disney Company; Rosemont Productions International

Original release
- Network: ABC
- Release: November 8, 1998

A Knight in Camelot is a 1998 television film starring Whoopi Goldberg and Michael York, directed by Roger Young, and loosely based on Mark Twain's 1889 novel A Connecticut Yankee in King Arthur's Court. The film was released as part of The Wonderful World of Disney anthology series that featured numerous productions released by the studio. The film premiered on ABC on November 8, 1998. Filming took place in the county of Northumberland, England, specifically Alnwick Castle (where a 1979 Disney iteration of the story had been filmed) as well as Budapest in Hungary.

== Plot ==
Scientist Vivien Morgan is zapped back to the medieval age and time of King Arthur and Camelot, when her scientific machine malfunctions. She is sent back along with many objects from her desk, including her laptop and boom box. As she is sentenced to be burned at the stake, she discovers among the laptop-data, that there will be a solar eclipse in short time. With her "magical powers" she makes the sun re-appear and is being knighted by King Arthur as Sir Boss and becomes a member of the Knights of the Round Table. She soon begins constructing devices that will not be present for many centuries, she saves the king, defeats Sir Sagramore and saves the day countless times before being zapped back to the present.

== Cast ==
- Whoopi Goldberg as Dr. Vivien Morgan/Sir Boss
- Michael York as King Arthur
- Paloma Baeza as Sandy
- Simon Fenton as Clarence
- James Coombes as Sir Lancelot
- Robert Addie as Sir Sagramore
- Ian Richardson as Merlin
- Amanda Donohoe as Queen Guinevere
- John Guerrasio as Bob
- Steve Speirs as Head of arms
- Ben Lambert as Lord #3

== See also ==
- List of films featuring eclipses
