= Samuel Collings (actor) =

British actor from London

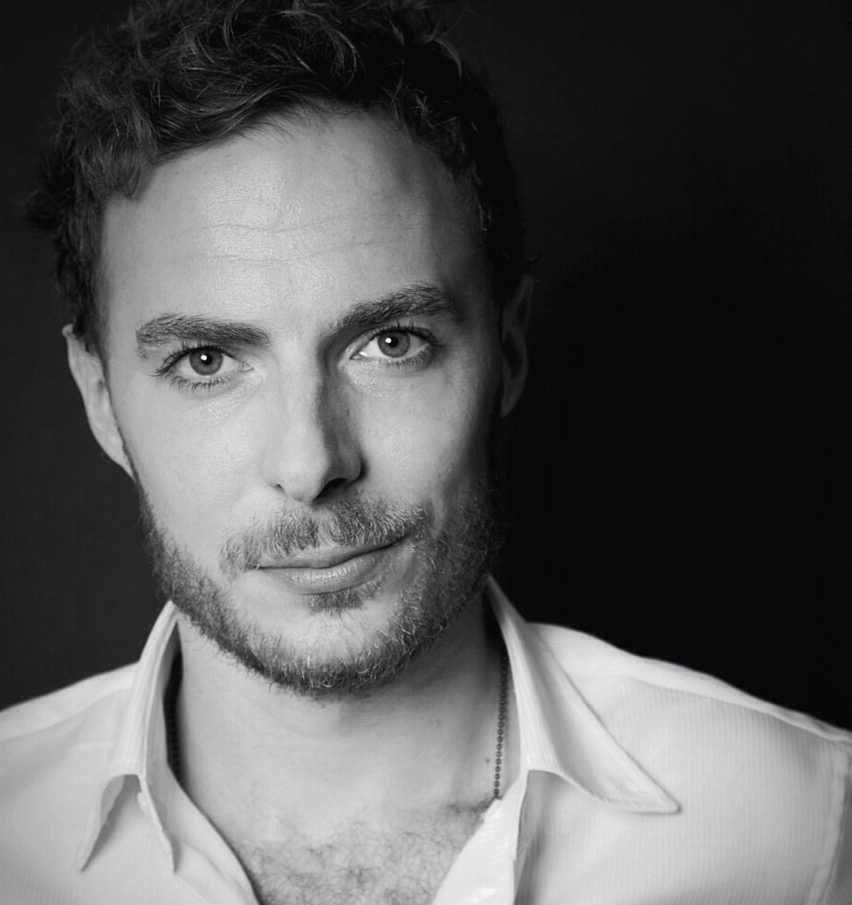
- Born: London, England
- Occupation: Actor
- Years active: 2000s–Present
- Father: David Collings

Samuel Collings is a British actor from London.

== Life and career ==
Samuel Collings is the son of actors David Collings and Karen Archer. His twin sister, Eliza, is also an actor. Collings became interested in acting from a very early age and was highly involved in the creative arts—particularly theatre, dance and music—before joining both the National Youth Theatre and Glyndebourne Youth Group, among other companies.

Professionally he has appeared on stage and screen in the UK, US and internationally. In the television series Hex he played the regular character of Tom, who is secretly gay and in love with his best friend, and the role of King Zedekiah in the Emmy Award-winning drama The Bible. Other credits include The Last Czars, The Lost Pirate Kingdom (both Netflix), Outlander (Seasons 4 & 5), Shakespeare Uncovered, New Tricks, The Insiders, Envoi, Dr Faustus, School For Scandal, Bluebird, The Briefcase, Dan Clark's Guide To Work, Doctors and Holby City.

Alongside screen acting, Collings has worked extensively in theatre and radio drama, as well as featuring on audio books, recordings and in other media such as voice over work. He also appeared in verbatim theatre and staged readings for the companies Ice and Fire and Actors For Human Rights (née Actors For Refugees) in London and across the UK, as well as performances for charity organisations including Amnesty International and the NSPCC. Further outreach work has involved projects and workshops with correctional facilities in both the US & UK.

Selected radio includes BBC productions of Orpheus, I Am David, two adaptations of War and Peace, Soldiers' Loves and Soldiers' Lives, The Dora Bella Variation, Science at Sea, Cinderella D-Day and Penmarric, in addition to numerous live broadcasts and recordings for BBC New Writing, Resonance, Holy Mountain and others.

Samuel Collings performed alongside his parents and twin sister in a one-off performance of The Chances, a Jacobean comedy by John Fletcher. It was presented at Shakespeare's Globe as part of its Read Not Dead series. He appeared in radio drama with his father, the late David Collings, and sister Eliza Collings, before later appearing on stage with each in Edward II (The Royal Exchange) & Lady Windermere's Fan (The Royal Exchange)/ The Curse of the Egyptian Mummy (Regent's Park) respectively. He played alongside his mother, Karen Archer, in a production of School Play- a performance at The Duchess Theatre, West End. He appeared as her son.

== Selected filmography ==
- 2003: The Bill (ITV TV Series)
- 2004: Message in a Bottle (Short)
- 2005: Hex (Sky TV Series)
- 2006: Dan Clark's Guide To Working (Comedy Central TV Series)
- 2006: The Briefcase (Short)
- 2007 & 2012: Doctors (BBC TV Series)
- 2008: A Tale of Two Girls (Short)
- 2008: The Insiders (C4/Online TV Series)
- 2009: Holby City (BBC TV Series)
- 2010: Bluebird (Film)
- 2013: The Bible (US History/Lightworkers TV Series)
- 2013: Sc.25 (Short)
- 2013: Envoi (Film)
- 2014: New Tricks (BBC TV Series)
- 2016: Prose – "Further" (Music Video)
- 2017: Measure For Measure/Shakespeare Uncovered (The Globe)
- 2018: Outlander (Sony/Starz TV Series)
- 2018: The Last Tsars (Netflix/Nutopia TV Series)
- 2019: Outlander (Sony/Starz TV Series)
- 2019/2020: The Lost Pirate Kingdom (Netflix Series)

== Selected theatre ==
Samuel Collings is a member of Equity, the trade union for professional performers.

Year	Title	Role	Theatre	Location
2005	Dr Faustus	Good Angel/Sin/Various	Liverpool Playhouse	Liverpool, United Kingdom
2007	An Inspector Calls	Eric Birling	The Dukes	Lancaster, United Kingdom
2009	The School for Scandal,Dr Faustus	Joseph Surface Valdes/Rafe/Devil	Greenwich Theatre Stage on Screen	London, United Kingdom
2010	The Lady from the Sea	Lyngstrand	Royal Exchange Theatre	Manchester, United Kingdom
2010	The Comedy of Errors	Antipholus of Syracuse	Royal Exchange Theatre	Manchester, United Kingdom
2011	Edward II	Gaveston/Lightborn	Royal Exchange Theatre	Manchester, United Kingdom
2010–2011	The Man with the Flower in His Mouth	The Man	Oxford Playhouse/Greenwich Theatre/Metta/Tour	London, Oxford, Various, United Kingdom
2012	Lady Windermere's Fan	Lord Darlington	Royal Exchange Theatre	Manchester, United Kingdom
2012	Stand Up Diggers All, Collision	Various	Latitude	Latitude Festival, United Kingdom
2012	Mansfield Park	Henry Crawford	UK No.1 Tour/Theatre Royal	Various, United Kingdom
2013	A Midsummer Night's Dream	Demetrius	Grosvenor Park Open Air Theatre	Chester, United Kingdom
2013	Othello	Cassio	Grosvenor Park Open Air Theatre	Chester, United Kingdom
2013–2014	Antony & Cleopatra	Octavius Caesar	Royal Shakespeare Company, Public Theater, Gablestage Theatre	Stratford-Upon-Avon, UK New York, Miami, USA
