= The Lost Pirate Kingdom =

2021 television mini-series directed by Chris McMillan

- Promotional poster
- Genre: Documentary; Historical drama
- Written by: David McNab; Patrick Dickinson
- Directed by: Stan Griffin; Justin Rickett; Patrick Dickinson
- Starring: James Oliver Wheatley; Sam Callis; Tom Padley; Kevin Howarth; Evan Milton; Samuel Collings; Miles Yekinni; Jack Waldouck; Mia Tomlinson
- Narrated by: Derek Jacobi
- Composer: Michael A. Levine
- Country of origin: United States
- Original language: English
- No. of seasons: 1
- No. of episodes: 6

Production
- Editor: Gordon Burton
- Camera setup: Robin Fox; Martin Kobylarz
- Running time: 42–44 minutes

Original release
- Network: Netflix
- Release: March 15, 2021

The Lost Pirate Kingdom is a 2021 docuseries created for Netflix. This historical drama portrays the rise and fall of the eponymous early-18th century pirate republic based in Nassau, Bahamas. The series begins in 1715, shortly after the close of the War of the Spanish Succession, which pitted England against Spain. England had waged the war on the cheap, resorting to the use of privateers rather than incurring the expense of fully funding the Royal Navy. It was released on March 15, 2021.

== Cast ==
- James Oliver Wheatley as Edward Thatch a. k. a. Blackbeard
- Sam Callis as Benjamin Hornigold
- Tom Padley as Charles Vane
- Kevin Howarth as Woodes Rogers
- Evan Milton as Samuel Bellamy
- Samuel Collings as Paulsgrave Williams
- Miles Yekinni as Black Caesar
- Jack Waldouck as John Rackham
- Mia Tomlinson as Anne Bonny
- Phill Webster as John West
- Mark Gillis as Henry Jennings
- George Watkins as James Bonny
- Derek Jacobi as the narrator

== Episodes ==
No.	Title	Original release date
1	"Hoist the Black Flag"	March 15, 2021
The War of the Spanish Succession ends, leaving thousands of privateers unemployed in the Caribbean, but the sinking of a treasure fleet creates new opportunities.
2	"The Pirate Republic"	March 15, 2021
Tensions rise between Benjamin Hornigold and Henry Jennings when Hornigold declares Nassau a pirate republic.
3	"The Price of Loyalty"	March 15, 2021
Hornigold's crew mutinies after his refusal to attack English ships, but Edward Thatch remains loyal. Meanwhile, the attacking of British slaveships creates an unforeseen reaction.
4	"The Empire Strikes Back"	March 15, 2021
English authorities hire Woodes Rogers to put a stop to pirate attacks, while Samuel Bellamy sees his success come to an end.
5	"Deal or No Deal"	March 15, 2021
Rogers' campaign begins with the offer of a royal pardon to each pirate, but not all Nassau pirates take it.
6	"Dead or Alive"	March 15, 2021
Rogers gets control of Nassau, and the era of the pirate republic comes to a violent conclusion.

== Reception ==
For the series, review aggregator Rotten Tomatoes reported an approval rating of 100% based on five reviews, with an average rating of 7/10.
