= Tom's Midnight Garden (TV series) =

- Based on: Tom's Midnight Garden by Philippa Pearce
- Written by: Philippa Pearce
- Directed by: Christine Secombe
- Starring: Jeremy Rampling; Shaughan Seymour; Isabelle Amyes
- Country of origin: United Kingdom
- Original language: English
- No. of seasons: 1
- No. of episodes: 6

Production
- Producer: Paul Stone
- Running time: 26 minutes

Original release
- Network: BBC1
- Release: 4 January – 8 February 1989

Tom's Midnight Garden is a 1989 television series directed by Christine Secombe and starring Jeremy Rampling, Shaughan Seymour and Isabelle Amyes.The TV series is based on the novel Tom's Midnight Garden by Philippa Pearce, and filmed at Chenies Manor House in Buckinghamshire This adaptation stays true to Philippa Pearce's classic novel, blending a sense of wonder with emotional depth.

== Plot ==
Tom Long, a young boy who is sent to stay with his aunt and uncle in their dull, old house during the summer. One night, when the grandfather clock mysteriously strikes thirteen, Tom discovers that the backyard transforms into a magical, Victorian-era garden. There, he meets Hatty, a lonely girl who becomes his companion in this timeless world. As Tom returns to the garden night after night, he notices that time moves strangely—each visit shows Hatty growing older, from a little girl to a young woman, while Tom remains the same age. Through their friendship, Tom unravels the mystery of the garden and Hatty's life. In the present, he learns that Hatty is now an elderly woman, Mrs. Bartholomew, the upstairs neighbor, whose dreams connect the past and present. The series beautifully explores themes of time, memory, and the power of imagination.

== Cast ==
- Jeremy Rampling as Tom Long
- Shaughan Seymour as Uncle Alan
- Isabelle Amyes as Aunt Gwen
- Simon Fenton as Peter Long
- Caroline Waldron as Hatty
- Renée Asherson as Mrs. Bartholomew
- Richard Garnett as Abel
- Sarah Jane McKechnie as Mrs. Long
- Katherine Schofield as Aunt Grace
- Tessa Burbridge as Susan
- Gareth Kirkland as Barty
- Richard Cripwell as Older James
- Edward Sibley as Edgar
- Noah Huntley as James
- Ashley Clark as Hubert
- Kevin Francis as Man in Yard
- Bill Kerry as Roast Chestnut Seller
- Patrick Burke as Verger
- Miranda Burton as Little Hatty
- Will Club as Man with Dog
