= Chris Cross (TV series) =

Children's TV series

- Genre: Comedy
- Written by: Gary Cohen; Michael Leo Donovan
- Directed by: Dennis Abey; Ron Oliver
- Starring: Eugene Byrd; Simon Fenton; Rachel Blanchard; Timothy Douek; Nicola Stewart; Alan David
- Countries of origin: United Kingdom; Canada
- Original language: English
- No. of series: 2
- No. of episodes: 13

Production
- Running time: 28 minutes
- Production companies: Central TV; CINAR

Original release
- Network: ITV (CITV)
- Release: 18 March 1994 – 28 March 1995

Chris Cross is a children's television series produced by Central TV and CINAR (now WildBrain). The series premiered on CITV in the UK in 1994 and Showtime in the United States. Based on a British boarding school, it dealt with the shift from single to mixed-sex, and the rivalry between two male characters. It was filmed on location at Thoresby Hall, Nottinghamshire, England. It starred future Clueless actress Rachel Blanchard as Dinah.

== Summary ==
Set in an international boarding school in England, Stansfield Academy. Oliver Cross, a teenager, is the admired school king cool when, at the start of a new term, two things occur to change the situation: Stansfield becomes mixed-sex (or co-ed, as the US people have it) and a new teenage male pupil, Chris Hilton, joins the fray, immediately becoming popular with the girls and a clear challenge to Cross's established authority.

Neither Chris nor Cross like school very much so they decide to join forces to liven up the hitherto stuffy foundation, playing practical jokes galore. They represent a formidable team: Cross is black and has built his status on the back of his wisecracking and his abilities as a DJ; Chris is the US white athlete, a perfect student. Bossy fellow pupil Dinah is the headmaster's granddaughter.

== Cast ==
- Simon Fenton as Chris Hilton
- Eugene Byrd as Oliver Cross
- Rachel Blanchard as Dinah McGee
- Alan David as Mr Rogers
- Timothy Douek as X
- Tom Brodie as Mookie
- Oliver Gilbody as Charles Barkley
- Nicola Stewart as Casey Down
