= Us Girls =

- Written by: Lisselle Kayla
- Directed by: David Askey
- Starring: Joanne Campbell; Mona Hammond; Nicola Blackman; Marlaine Gordon
- Country of origin: United Kingdom
- Original language: English
- No. of series: 2
- No. of episodes: 12

Production
- Producer: David Askey
- Running time: 30 mins

Original release
- Network: BBC1
- Release: 27 February 1992 – 14 April 1993

Us Girls is a BBC Television sitcom about the culture gap among three generations of West Indian women. It was written by Carmen Harris under the pseudonym Lisselle Kayla.

Freelance journalist Bev Pinnock (Campbell in series one; Blackman in series two) was trying to live an independent life, which was being interrupted by her teenage daughter Aisha (Gordon) and her mother—Grandma (Hammond). They all shared a house in the first series. In series 2, the grandparents had moved across the road, but were still able to watch Bev and Aisha.
