= Arms of Loren =

Single by E'voke
- Released: 1996; 2002; 2012
- Genre: House music; trance music
- Length: 5:48
- Label: Manifesto; Inferno; Pinball
- Songwriters: Barry Leng & Duncan Hannant
- Producers: Barry Leng & Duncan Hannant

E'voke singles chronology
"Runaway" (1995)	"Arms of Loren" (1996)	"Missing You" (1998)

Music video
- "Arms of Loren" on YouTube

"Arms of Loren" is a single by British female vocal duo E'voke, first released as a single in 1996 by Manifesto Records. Following the chart success of "Runaway" in 1995, the duo recorded the track with producers Barry Leng and Duncan Hannant. The accompanying music video uses the Nip & Tuck edit. The track has been re-released numerous times.

== 1996 version ==
In 1996, "Arms of Loren" was signed to Manifesto Records, who commissioned a remix by Nip & Tuck which removed the vocal bridges and restructured the lyrics of the chorus. Radio edits of both the Nip & Tuck remix and the original version (entitled the Steinway mix) were issued on promotional CDs with the Nip & Tuck version being the lead radio version (the Steinway radio edit went on to be unreleased on the commercial release). A video to a slightly edited version of the Nip & Tuck edit was released. The track has been re-released numerous times.

"Arms of Loren" received heavy support from numerous DJs including Pete Tong, Judge Jules, Sasha and Paul Oakenfold and expectations for chart success were high for the track upon its release on 22 July 1996 on CD, 12-inch and cassette. However, upon release, the track reached #25 in the UK Top 40 before falling to #38 the following week, then to #54. The track would spend a further three weeks in the UK Top 200. Following the commercial failure of the track, a follow-on single would not be released on Manifesto Records.

The track was also released in France with a special set of remixes released on vinyl. The commercially unreleased Steinway radio edit of the track was released on the French CD single.

After its release, "Arms of Loren" continued to be played frequently in clubs over the following years and the track did make a brief re-appearance in the UK Top 200 in March 1998, reaching #155.

=== Critical reception ===
British magazine Music Week gave the song a score of four out of five, adding, "Pumping beats and a crystal clear female vocal are wrapped up in Robert Miles-ish dreamy vibes. Not easy to categorise, but wonderful nevertheless."

=== 1996 versions ===
- Steinway Mix 5:48
- The Steinway Radio Edit 4:00
- Nip 'N' Tuck Edit 4:25
- Nip 'N' Tuck Original 8:08
- Nip 'N' Tuck Instrumental 8:07
- Nip 'N' Tuck Edit 4:02 (this was on the UK promo CD only)
- Nip 'N' Tuck Instrumental 6:42 (one of the CD pressings had this version, which fades out early)
- Nip 'N' Tuck F. Edit 3:20 (this was on the French CD release only)
- Club Remix 3:43 (French 12" only)
- Full Club Mix 4:42 (French 12" only)
- The V Team's Mix 5:00 (French 12" only)
- Instrumental 3:42 (French 12" only)

=== Charts ===
==== Weekly charts ====
Chart (1996)	Peak position
Europe (Eurochart Hot 100)	55
Scotland (OCC)	27
UK Singles (OCC)	25
UK Airplay (Music Week)	44
UK Dance (OCC)	1
UK Club Chart (Music Week)	3

==== Year-end charts ====
Chart (1996)	Position
UK Club Chart (Music Week)	99

== 2002 release ==
In 2001, the head of Inferno Records, who had been a fan of the track and thought that it had never reached its potential, played the track over the phone to DJ Ferry Corsten, who liked the track and decided to produce a remix for Inferno Records based on the Nip & Tuck remix (a chill-out remix by Tranquillo would use the vocal layout from the original Steinway Mix). A white label, followed by promotional copies of Corsten's remixes, were issued towards the end of 2001. Indeed, the promotional copies labelled the track "Arms Of Loren 2001" though the track would not actually be released until 21 January 2002. The track became a club hit and momentum began to build for the track's commercial release in January, often a quiet time of year in which not many sales were needed to reach the higher ends of the UK chart. There were rumours of original vocalists Marlaine and Kerry reforming to promote the track however ultimately only Kerry became involved in the re-release, appearing in the video with a model who lip-synced to Marlaine's vocals.

Once again upon release (on CD and two separate 12" versions), the track failed to meet commercial expectations, debuting at #31 – six places lower than the original, falling to #44 in its second week and then to #65. The track spent a further two weeks in the UK Top 200, making a re-entry at #113 in May 2002 and spending a further three weeks in the Top 200.

Once again despite the commercial failure, the Ferry Corsten remix became a trance classic, appearing on numerous "Best of Trance" compilation CDs.

=== 2002 versions ===
- Ferry Corsten Radio Edit 3:34
- Ferry Corsten Remix 6:35
- Ferry Corsten Dub 6:20 (12" release only)
- D Ramirez Bitcrusher Dub 7:40 (12" release only)
- Tranquillo's Clear Water Mix 6:15

== 2006 release ==
In early 2006, All Around The World Productions commissioned several new remixes of the track, which had continued to live on in the clubs, both the Steinway version from 1996 and the Ferry Corsten mix from 2001 to 2002. The remixes were never released, not even on promotional copies, though a couple of them did leak years later. No explanation was given by AATW as to why the tracks went unreleased.

=== 2006 versions ===
- KB Project Remix 6:15
- Dancing DJs Remix 6:39
- Clubstar Mix
- 8th Day/Kenny Hayes Tribute Mix
- Love To Infinity Remix

== 2012 release ==
In 2011, both the CD releases of the 1996 and 2002 releases were released digitally. In early 2012, Pinball Records (owned by Frank Sansom who owned Pulse 8 Records who E'voke were signed to in 1997) commissioned new remixes of "Arms Of Loren" which were released on 15 April 2012. Whilst the track failed to chart commercially, the track was successful enough to warrant remixes of another E'voke track, "Runaway", to be commissioned along with an album.

=== 2012 versions ===
- Thomas Gandey (Cagedbaby) Radio Edit 4:28
- Thomas Gandey (Cagedbaby) Club Mix 7:41
- Thomas Gandey (Cagedbaby) Dub Mix 7:42 (Beatport release only)
- Dehasse Radio Edit 3:19 (Promo CD release only)
- Dehasse Extended Mix 7:49
- Rudedog Club Mix (Edit) 3:28 (Beatport release only)
- Rudedog Club Mix 6:22 (Beatport release only)
- Rudedog Euro Edit 3:42 (Promo CD release only)
- Rudedog Euro Extended Mix 6:34
