= Runaway (E'voke song) =

1995 single by E'voke

Single by E'voke
- Released: 1995; 2012
- Genre: House; nu-NRG; trance
- Length: 5:03
- Label: Ffrreedom; Pinball Records
- Songwriters: Barry Leng; Duncan Hannant
- Producers: Barry Leng; Duncan Hannant

E'voke singles chronology
"I Believe" (1994)	"Runaway" (1995)	"Arms of Loren" (1996)

Music video
- "Runaway" on YouTube

"Runaway" is a song by British female duo E'voke, first released in 1995 as a single. Following the release of their cover of Stevie Wonder's "I Believe" in 1994, the duo recorded the track with producers Barry Leng and Duncan Hannant. The resulting track was signed to Ffreedom (a subsidiary of FFRR) and remixes were commissioned. One of the remixes was accredited to TTF and was similar in sound to TTF's remix of N-Trance's "Set You Free" which had been a major hit earlier in 1995. Jon Campbell of TTF denied that the remix was done by them. A black-and-white music video to a slightly edited version of the Biff & Memphis edit was released which was later released on iTunes in 2011. Upon release, the track reached number 30 in the UK Top 40 in November 1995, before falling to 49 the following week, then to 65. On the UK Dance Singles Chart, "Runaway" reached number three. Later same year, a bootleg remix by Jimmy J & Cru-L-T was released. In 2012, the track was re-released.

== Critical reception ==
Tim Jeffery from British magazine Music Week's RM Dance Update gave "Runaway" a score of four out of five, writing, "A refreshingly unusual and original track that has a long drown out intro that's not quite ambient as there's a breakbeat snapping away faintly in the background but the warm strings, synths and female vocals sound effects certainly have a relaxing vibe. The track suddenly shifts up a couple of gears into Nu-NRG territory with a pulsing bassline and stabbing synths for a powerful finale." Another RM editor, James Hamilton described it as a "lisping and squawking sometimes painfully shrill UK girl duo's catchy Euro style romp". Also Andrew Diprose from Smash Hits gave the single four out of five, adding, "E-Voke made one of the finest records of last year with their version of the Stevie Wonder classic 'I Believe'. Unfortunately that flopped, but this should do a lot better. A high-energy N-Trance-ish pop blast that deserves to be a big hit."

== Remixes ==
- Original mix – 5:03
- Original radio edit – 3:58 (unreleased)
- TTF 12" – 5:30
- TTF edit – 3:42
- Biff 'n' Memphis mix – 9:34
- Biff 'n' Memphis edit – 4:34

== Charts ==
Chart (1995)	Peak position
Europe (Eurochart Hot 100)	93
Scotland (OCC)	35
UK Singles (OCC)	30
UK Dance (OCC)	3
UK Club Chart (Music Week)	32

== 2012 release ==
Following the digital release of "Runaway" in 2011 and the 2012 re-release of "Arms of Loren", Pinball records commissioned new remixes of "Runaway" which were released on 23 September 2012.

=== Track listing ===
- Cagedbaby radio edit – 3:40
- Cagedbaby club edit – 9:02
- J. Edgar Hooverbass club – 5:36
- J. Edgar Hooverbass dub – 7:27
- Sonny Wharton club – 6:14
- Sonny Wharton dub – 6:14
