= Look and Read =

British children's educational TV series (1967–2004)

- Genre: Educational
- Country of origin: United Kingdom
- Original language: English
- No. of series: 23
- No. of episodes: 208

Production
- Running time: 20 minutes

Original release
- Network: BBC1 (1967–83); BBC2 (1984–2004)
- Release: 9 January 1967 – 29 March 2004

Look and Read is a British educational television programme as part of the BBC Schools strand from 9 January 1967 to 29 March 2004. The programme is aimed at primary school children aged between 7 and 9. It teaches literacy skills alongside fictional stories in a serial format.

== History ==
The programme was devised from 1964 by radio producer Claire Chovil, educated at Roedean, and assistant Joyce Morris. By 1982, Clare was head of BBC radio schools broadcasting, and awarded the OBE in the 1988 Birthday Honours; on January 14 2008 she died aged 78.

== Programme format ==
Although originally produced for the series Merry-Go-Round, "Bob and Carol Look for Treasure" was broadcast as the first Look and Read story in the spring of 1967. The serial took the format, which the programme would continue for many years, of each episode's story being divided into two instalments with an educational section in the middle to teach children the relevant material. Teachers were also provided with story books, or "pupil pamphlets", for each serial, from which they could provide their pupils the story as well as exercises and games. The plots of the stories were written to appeal to children, initially inspired by adventure serials, and often featured puzzles for the characters to solve using their reading skills, which was also reflected in the material given to pupils. Each serial was also written with a limited vocabulary in mind, each of the keywords paced through the piece a certain number of times so they held a certain relevance above other words. They used Alphakids mostly when words appeared.

During the 1970s the programme began to bring in many new elements for a new generation of viewers. Popular new educational songs were introduced which would remain until into the 90s as well as the character Wordy. In the 1980s and early 1990s the plots also started to contain contemporary issues such as pollution. Towards the latter part of the 1990s the programme began to steer away from some of the elements of the past by, in some cases, removing songs and combining teaching elements with the story segment of the programme. The producers also began making use of the internet as a teaching aid for the programme, allowing children to access games and material through a dedicated website, although the BBC have since removed the sites due to dwindling use, to the dismay of some teachers.

== List of Look and Read stories ==
=== Bob and Carol Look for Treasure (1967) ===
No. overall	No. in series	Title	Original release date
1	1	"The Lost Treasure Part One"	9 January 1967
Two children, Bob and Carol, search for clues to find a hidden treasure.
2	2	"The Lost Treasure Part Two"	16 January 1967
3	3	"The Lost Treasure Part Three"	23 January 1967
4	4	"The Lost Treasure Part Four"	30 January 1967
5	5	"The Lost Treasure Part Five"	6 February 1967
6	6	"The Lost Treasure Part Six"	13 February 1967
7	7	"The Stolen Treasure Part One"	20 February 1967
Bob and Carol must follow clues left by the robbers of the treasure.
8	8	"The Stolen Treasure Part Two"	27 February 1967
9	9	"The Stolen Treasure Part Three"	6 March 1967
10	10	"The Stolen Treasure Part Four"	13 March 1967

=== Len and the River Mob (1968) ===
No. overall	No. in series	Title	Original release date
11	1	"A Job in the Docks"	15 January 1968
Len Tanner, a young dock worker, begins to suspect that his boss and workmates are members of an infamous gang of thieves known as "The River Mob".
12	2	"The Dutch Doll"	22 January 1968
13	3	"The Missing Crate"	29 January 1968
14	4	"The Big Job"	5 February 1968
15	5	"Captain Grenko"	12 February 1968
16	6	"Is Len a Thief?"	26 February 1968
17	7	"This Way Up"	4 March 1968
18	8	"Tied and Gagged"	11 March 1968
19	9	"Find The S.S. Samba"	18 March 1968
20	10	"After Them!"	25 March 1968

=== The Boy from Space (1971) ===
No. overall	No. in series	Title	Original release date
21	1	"The Meteorite"	21 September 1971
Helen and her brother Dan spot a light in the sky one night that they decide to investigate. Upon discovering a meteorite they meet a young alien child, who they name Peep-Peep. When the alien boy and his father are kidnapped it is up to the two children to follow a trail of clues to find their new friend.
22	2	"The Spinning Compass"	28 September 1971
23	3	"The Man in the Sand-pit"	5 October 1971
24	4	"In danger!"	12 October 1971
25	5	"The Hold-up"	19 October 1971
26	6	"Where is Tom?"	2 November 1971
27	7	"The Hunt for the Car"	9 November 1971
28	8	"The Lake"	16 November 1971
29	9	"Captured!"	23 November 1971
30	10	"In the Space-ship"	30 November 1971

=== Joe and the Sheep Rustlers (1973) ===
No. overall	No. in series	Title	Original release date
31	1	"Castle Farm"	16 January 1973
Joe, a shepherd boy, and his friend Jill decide to investigate the theft of some sheep from Castle Farm, and discover it to be the work of the villainous Beasley brothers, Ted and Denis.
32	2	"Blackmail"	23 January 1973
33	3	"A Mistake?"	30 January 1973
34	4	"One in Three"	6 February 1973
35	5	"Never Say Die"	13 February 1973
36	6	"Prisoner in the House"	27 February 1973
37	7	"The Red Trail"	6 March 1973
38	8	"Left to Rot"	13 March 1973
39	9	"Put Up Your Hands"	20 March 1973
40	10	"The Hero"	27 March 1973

=== Cloud Burst (1974) ===
No. overall	No. in series	Title	Original release date
41	1	"Out of Control"	24 September 1974
Whilst playing with a toy plane, Jenny Barber and her brother, Tim, meet a scientist, Ram Pandit, who is working on a secret invention. When Ram is kidnapped apparently by the mysterious Man on a Motor Bike who is working for rivals trying to get information on his work, it is up to the children to find them and stop his invention from falling into the wrong hands.
42	2	"Ram Pandit"	1 October 1974
43	3	"RAV1"	8 October 1974
44	4	"The Gas-gun"	15 October 1974
45	5	"In The Hut"	22 October 1974
46	6	"The Secret"	5 November 1974
47	7	"To The Mill!"	12 November 1974
48	8	"The Signal"	19 November 1974
49	9	"Escape"	26 November 1974
50	10	"Fire The Rockets!"	3 December 1974

=== The King's Dragon (1977) ===
No. overall	No. in series	Title	Original release date
51	1	"Boy Finds Message"	11 January 1977
Billy West, a fisherman's grandson, discovers some threatening messages made up from newspaper cuttings. When he and a local journalist go to investigate, they discover that they are targeted at an archaeologist working at a local castle whose life is suddenly under threat because of the long lost local treasure; King Harold's golden armring known as "The King's Dragon".
52	2	"Questions at the Castle"	18 January 1977
53	3	"What is King's Dragon?"	25 January 1977
54	4	"Miss Wood in Danger?"	1 February 1977
55	5	"Mr Day Helps With Story"	8 February 1977
56	6	"Greed For Gold"	22 February 1977
57	7	"Editor Asks For Proof"	1 March 1977
58	8	"Run Around in Old Town"	8 March 1977
59	9	"Archaeologist Digs Again"	15 March 1977
60	10	"Banner Headlines"	22 March 1977

=== Sky Hunter (1978) ===
No. overall	No. in series	Title	Original release date
61	1	"Strangers on the Canal"	19 September 1978
Whilst on a boating holiday, three friends, Jackie, Butch and Trevor, must help stop the illegal theft and trading of birds in the area.
62	2	"For Sale"	26 September 1978
63	3	"The Birdman"	3 October 1978
64	4	"Are They Crooks?"	10 October 1978
65	5	"The Welsh Telegram"	17 October 1978
66	6	"Proof at Last!"	24 October 1978
67	7	"A Friend in Need"	7 November 1978
68	8	"Where's Jackie?"	14 November 1978
69	9	"Who Can Be Trusted?"	21 November 1978
70	10	"Back to the Wild"	28 November 1978

=== The Boy from Space (1980) ===
No. overall	No. in series	Title	Original release date
71	1	"The Meteorite"	15 January 1980
A reworking of the 1971 tale (above)
72	2	"The Spinning Compass"	22 January 1980
73	3	"The Man in the Sand-pit"	29 January 1980
74	4	"In danger!"	5 February 1980
75	5	"The Hold-up"	12 February 1980
76	6	"Where is Tom?"	26 February 1980
77	7	"The Hunt for the Car"	4 March 1980
78	8	"The Lake"	11 March 1980
79	9	"Captured!"	18 March 1980
80	10	"In the Spaceship"	25 March 1980

=== Dark Towers (1981) ===
No. overall	No. in series	Title	Original release date
81	1	"Dark Towers in Danger!"	22 September 1981
When Tracy chases her dog into the mysterious Dark Towers, she becomes involved in a race to find the old house's hidden treasure.
82	2	"The Man in the Picture"	29 September 1981
83	3	"The Old Legend"	6 October 1981
84	4	"The Clue in the Book"	13 October 1981
85	5	"The Old Coach House"	20 October 1981
86	6	"The Tall Knight's Folly"	3 November 1981
87	7	"The Dark Tree"	10 November 1981
88	8	"Beware of the Bird!"	17 November 1981
89	9	"Who Can Help?"	24 November 1981
90	10	"The Last Laugh"	1 December 1981

=== Fair Ground! (1983) ===
No. overall	No. in series	Title	Original release date
91	1	"Trouble in the Tea-Leaves"	11 January 1983
Ozzie Watson loves the fair that comes to town at Easter, but when a series of disturbances and crimes occur there it is up to him to solve the problem.
92	2	"Comings and Goings"	18 January 1983
93	3	"Hired Hands"	25 January 1983
94	4	"In The Dark"	1 February 1983
95	5	"Come To The Fair!"	8 February 1983
96	6	"Where Is Rachel?"	15 February 1983
97	7	"Ozzie Thinks Again"	1 March 1983
98	8	"A Piece of Cake!"	8 March 1983
99	9	"Talk or Ride…"	15 March 1983
100	10	"Mixed Fortunes"	22 March 1983

=== Badger Girl (1984) ===
No. overall	No. in series	Title	Original release date
101	1	"Sounds in the Night"	18 September 1984
Three city children go on holiday to the country. Whilst there they meet various people out on the moor, some of whom are involved in pony-rustling. It is up to them to work out who is involved and how to stop it.
102	2	"Stripey"	25 September 1984
103	3	"Running Away"	2 October 1984
104	4	"The Badgerman"	9 October 1984
105	5	"Lost on the Moor"	16 October 1984
106	6	"The Secret Passage"	30 October 1984
107	7	"Mick's Map"	6 November 1984
108	8	"Finding the Ponies"	13 November 1984
109	9	"Panic on the Lake"	20 November 1984
110	10	"Stripey the Superbadger"	27 November 1984

=== Geordie Racer (1988) ===
No. overall	No. in series	Title	Original release date
111	1	"Runners and Fliers"	12 January 1988
Richard "Spuggy" Hilton loves spending time at the local pigeon lofts. When he discovers secret messages being received by pigeon, he suspects Baz, a local pigeon trainer, of being involved in a series of local robberies. Spuggy and his friend Janie must link the clues to try to solve the case.
112	2	"Down in the Cellars"	19 January 1988
113	3	"Pigeon Post"	26 January 1988
114	4	"'This is Radio Newcastle'"	2 February 1988
115	5	"Race Day"	9 February 1988
116	6	"Light of St Mary"	16 February 1988
117	7	"Lost Bird"	1 March 1988
118	8	"'Have You Gone Daft, Man?'"	8 March 1988
119	9	"'If Only We Knew When...'"	15 March 1988
120	10	"Run!"	22 March 1988

=== Through the Dragon's Eye (1989) ===
No. overall	No. in series	Title	Directed by	Written by	Original release date
121	1	"The Dragon from Pelamar"	Unknown	Christoper and Christine Russell	19 September 1989
Three children (Jenny, Scott and Amanda) pass through a mural they have been painting and find themselves in the magical land of Pelamar.
122	2	"Flight to Widge"	Unknown	Christoper and Christine Russell	26 September 1989
Amanda, Scott, Boris, Rodey and Gorwen set off to find the lost Veetons. Gorwen the Dragon believes that the missing Veetons must have fallen beyond the mountains of Pelamar into the strange land of Widge.
123	3	"The First Veeton"	Unknown	Christoper and Christine Russell	3 October 1989
With the Widgets as their guides, the search party set off through the Woods of Widge.
124	4	"Word Magic"	Unknown	Christoper and Christine Russell	10 October 1989
The Widgets have hidden the first Veeton inside a huge book tree. Boris and Amanda manage to unlock it and enter it in search of the Veeton, while Scott and the dragon Gorwen search for Rodey, who is still missing.
125	5	"Clues in the Snow"	Unknown	Christoper and Christine Russell	17 October 1989
With the help of the veetarod, Scott and Gorwen find Boris, Amanda and the first Veeton in a gravel pit. Scott, Boris and Gorwen find that the Widgets have taken the Veeton and Boris' rucksack, and that they have kidnapped Amanda. Gorwen sets off to find them, while Boris and Scott continue to Ash Rock.
126	6	"Jenny's Scarf"	Unknown	Christoper and Christine Russell	31 October 1989
Amanda chases the Widget who stole Boris' rucksack, with the Veeton in it. She rescues it and in doing so, finds Rodey, but they find themselves lost in the snow. Boris and Scott find another clue at Ash Rock.
127	7	"The Waterfall of Words"	Unknown	Christoper and Christine Russell	7 November 1989
During the night, the search party pitch a tent and spend the night at the top of the mountains, until two troublesome Widgets sneak in and steal Boris' map of Widge. They rip the map, leaving Boris, Amanda, Scott and Rodey alone with no "map, no time and no words to help" them. Suddenly, a waterfall of words appears gushing down the mountainside, giving them a clue.
128	8	"The Great Battle"	Unknown	Christoper and Christine Russell	14 November 1989
Gorwen returns to the Veetacore House, where Charn is waiting for him. Morris tries to warn him, but is zapped by Charn. There is a great battle and Charn is eventually beaten forever; Charn had already been beaten once by Gorwen and as a result was banished from Pelamar.
129	9	"Danger on High"	Unknown	Christoper and Christine Russell	21 November 1989
Rodey rescues the veetarod, which had fallen down a deep chasm in the tunnel. The veetarod leads them up to the top of the mountain. Rodey rescues the veetarod, which had fallen down a deep chasm in the tunnel. The veetarod leads them up to the top of the mountain.
130	10	"The Final Page"	Unknown	Christoper and Christine Russell	28 November 1989
Scott, with the help of the Widgets, manages to rescue the last Veeton. Meanwhile, Doris and Morris fit the penultimate piece of the Veetacore and wait for the others to return with the last Veeton.

=== Sky Hunter II (1992) ===
This series was a reworking of the 1978 series

No. overall	No. in series	Title	Original release date
131	1	"Strangers on the Canal"	14 January 1992
132	2	"For Sale"	21 January 1992
133	3	"The Birdman"	28 January 1992
134	4	"Too Many Crooks"	4 February 1992
135	5	"The Welsh Telegram"	11 February 1992
136	6	"Proof at Last"	18 February 1992
137	7	"A Friend in Need"	3 March 1992
138	8	"Where is Jackie?"	10 March 1992
139	9	"Trim's Tricks"	17 March 1992
140	10	"Back to the Wild"	24 March 1992

=== Earth Warp (1994) ===
No. overall	No. in series	Title	Original release date
141	1	"It Came From Outer Space"	11 January 1994
Three children, Martin, Amina and Jenny, befriend an alien named Ollie who they must help in his task of saving the local Southbeach from being destroyed due to pollution.
142	2	"An Uninvited Guest"	18 January 1994
143	3	"Whoops!"	25 January 1994
144	4	"Code Name Charley"	1 February 1994
145	5	"Mystifying Magic"	8 February 1994
146	6	"Monster Mayhem"	22 February 1994
147	7	"Doctor Miracle"	1 March 1994
148	8	"Betrayed"	8 March 1994
149	9	"Hunt The Alien"	15 March 1994
150	10	"The Final Countdown"	22 March 1994

=== LRTV (1995) ===
No. overall	No. in series	Title	Original release date
151	1	"Welcome to LRTV"	24 April 1995
A magazine style series designed to improve writing and communication skills. Set in a TV studio where the channel was run by children.
152	2	"LRTV Gets Moving"	1 May 1995
153	3	"Kitchen Capers"	12 May 1995
154	4	"A Soap Square Sizzler"	15 May 1995
155	5	"…and Action!"	22 May 1995
156	6	"Follow That Frog"	5 June 1995
157	7	"LRTV Gets It Together"	12 June 1995
158	8	"Happy Birthday LRTV!"	19 June 1995

=== Spywatch (1996) ===
No. overall	No. in series	Title	Directed by	Written by	Original release date
159	1	"Sent Away"	Nicholas Whines	Derek Farmer	15 January 1996
Middle-aged Norman Starkey, a former wartime evacuee, finds his old scrapbook, and decides to write a book about his experience, so he heads back to Westbourne. He recounts being sent off to Westbourne where he meets Cyril Jenkins and another evacuee, Mary Parker. Cyril drives them to Westbourne Hall, home to Phillip Grainger, and his housekeeper, Miss Millington. They refuse to take Norman, but take Mary instead. Norman is driven to nearby Wells Farm where he is taken in by kindly Amy Hobbs, who has recently taken in another evacuee named Dennis Sealey.
160	2	"Grainger Danger"	Nicholas Whines	Derek Farmer	22 January 1996
Norman and Dennis, both strangers to country life, are put to work on Amy's farm by Amy's granddaughter, Polly, and are both terrified when they find themselves surrounded by cows. Meanwhile, Mary is being forced to do the housework by Grainger and Millington. Grainger also pays Wells Farm a visit and tries to get Amy to move out of the farm, to which he was the landlord, but she refuses.
161	3	"Spies All Around"	Nicholas Whines	Derek Farmer	29 January 1996
Amy's cows have escaped and it looks as if the fence has been cut. Norman, Dennis, and Polly suspect Grainger is to blame. Later, the whole village attends a lecture where Cyril Jenkins shows them a series of posters of people who may be spies in disguise, but one poster in particular startles Norman, Dennis and Polly; an image of a woman in half a Nazi uniform and half normal clothing stays in their minds. Meanwhile, in the present, Norman decides to track down Polly.
162	4	"Trouble For Mary"	Nicholas Whines	Derek Farmer	5 February 1996
Luigi Balzoni, an Italian POW, arrives to help on the farm. Amy initially is untrustful of Luigi, but he soon wins her trust. Also, Miss Millington steals Mary's money and accuses Mary of stealing from her. Later, Mary writes a letter to her parents and gives it to Millington to post. However, Millington reads the letter in which Mary describes to her parents how horrible Grainger and Miss Millington are, how badly they're treating her, and begs them to come and get her. Millington throws the letter in the fire.
163	5	"The Poster Comes To Life"	Nicholas Whines	Derek Farmer	12 February 1996
Norman becomes homesick after receiving a letter from his mother. He goes for a walk by the river and meets Mike Johnson, a lieutenant from the nearby U.S. Army base who shows him how to fish. Meanwhile, Mary agrees to help Polly and Dennis find out if Grainger is a spy. On the way back to the Farm, Polly and Dennis encounter a strange woman who bears a striking resemblance to the woman in the poster Cyril Jenkins showed them. When the woman asks for directions to the village, Polly, convinced she's an enemy spy, intentionally sends her the wrong way and thinks they've seen the last of her – until she turns up at the front door!
164	6	"Bombs In The Country"	Nicholas Whines	Derek Farmer	26 February 1996
The mystery woman introduces herself as Vivienne Belling, and she claims to be a government photographer. However, the kids are suspicious of her. Meanwhile, Mary overhears an interesting conversation between Grainger and Miss Millington. Mike gives the children chocolate which is rationed. Also, Polly and Dennis spot a German plane.
165	7	"Surprise"	Nicholas Whines	Derek Farmer	4 March 1996
Polly and Dennis narrowly avoid being killed by the German plane's bombs. Norman later spies Grainger giving a package to Vivienne Belling. Mary tries to uncover evidence to prove Grainger's a spy. Also, Norman's mother comes to visit him on his birthday. The next day, however, an even bigger surprise awaits the kids in their secret meeting place (the greenhouse at Westbourne Hall).
166	8	"The Pilot"	Nicholas Whines	Derek Farmer	11 March 1996
The kids find an injured German pilot in the greenhouse. The pilot is later arrested, and the kids suspicions of Vivienne Belling deepen when they hear her speaking German to the pilot. Also, in another attempt to get Amy to leave the farm, Grainger pulls some strings to have Luigi moved to Westbourne Hall. That night, Mary follows Grainger and Millington to try to find out what they're up to.
167	9	"The Secret Quarry"	Nicholas Whines	Derek Farmer	18 March 1996
The kids find a tunnel leading from an abandoned quarry to Westbourne Hall. Norman and Dennis are caught by Grainger, but are saved by Luigi, who Grainger has arrested shortly afterwards for stealing from the Hall.
168	10	"Captured"	Nicholas Whines	Derek Farmer	25 March 1996
The children learn that Grainger and Miss Millington are simply black marketeers rather than spies. Norman and Mary try to call the police from Westbourne Hall, but are caught by Grainger and Millington and locked in a shed. Seeing them captured, Polly goes off to find a phone, only to bump into Vivienne Belling. Polly attacks her, but is stopped by Mike. Polly leads them to the quarry where Dennis has managed to free Norman and Mary, who trap Grainger and Millington in the shed. The blackmarketeers are arrested, and Vivienne Belling reveals she was investigating Grainger the whole time. Mary is moved to Wells Farm and the charges against Luigi are dropped and he returns to work on the Farm. Norman's mother arrives at the Farm to take Norman home. In the present, Norman is finally reunited with Polly.

=== Captain Crimson (1997) ===
No. overall	No. in series	Title	Original release date
169	1	"Escape From The Black of Beyond"	14 April 1997
Jeff is a comic book artist whose most popular creation is the superhero Captain Crimson. When Jeff's son Tom and his friend Amy make up the ending to one of the comics, it causes Captain Crimson to appear in the real world, forcing the two friends to find ways of hiding the hero whilst he goes on a series of adventures.
170	2	"Guzzle Trouble"	21 April 1997
171	3	"Banana Drama"	28 April 1997
172	4	"A Giant Celebration"	9 May 1997
173	5	"It'll All Come Out in the Wash"	12 May 1997
174	6	"Take The Bull By The Horns"	19 May 1997
175	7	"Operation Recovery"	2 June 1997
176	8	"Black to the Future"	9 June 1997

=== The Legend of the Lost Keys (1998) ===
No. overall	No. in series	Title	Directed by	Written by	Original release date
177	1	"The Box"	Colin Cant	Jim Eldridge	12 January 1998
Mark and Lisa need to help their Uncle George (the current guardian) stop an ancient box from being opened. The box is a doorway to a slave world.
178	2	"The First Key"	Colin Cant	Jim Eldridge	19 January 1998
George, Mark and Lisa begin the search for the three keys to the box. Lisa is awakened during the night by people who think her uncle has the first key.
179	3	"The Watchers"	Colin Cant	Jim Eldridge	26 January 1998
Lisa and Mark are searching for the second key; when they find it, the Watchers try to kidnap them.
180	4	"Kidnap"	Colin Cant	Jim Eldridge	2 February 1998
Having escaped from the attempted kidnap by the Watchers, the twins join up their Uncle George to locate the third and final key at the Roman baths.
181	5	"The Crystal Connection"	Colin Cant	Jim Eldridge	9 February 1998
Now having all three keys, George and the twins persuade Professor Waters let them in to see the box.
182	6	"The Trap"	Colin Cant	Jim Eldridge	23 February 1998
George breaks into the Janus Foundation to try to steal the box back, but then Mark and Lisa realise it is, in fact, a trap.
183	7	"The Box is Opened"	Colin Cant	Jim Eldridge	2 March 1998
The gateway to the world of Heritron is now opened. George and the twins escape from the Janus Foundation, but are then betrayed.
184	8	"Into the Box"	Colin Cant	Jim Eldridge	9 March 1998
Professor Waters retrieves the Box back from the Watchers' Headquarters, and George goes through the portal to lock the doorway into Heritron forever. The Catchers are waiting for him on the other side.
185	9	"Betrayed"	Colin Cant	Jim Eldridge	16 March 1998
George is held against his will on Heritron. Anna tells Mark and Lisa that they must rescue him.
186	10	"The Final Hour"	Colin Cant	Jim Eldridge	23 March 1998
The twins find George imprisoned in a crystal cell. They manage to break him free, but can they escape from Heritron and get back home?

=== Zzaap and the Word Master (2001) ===
No. overall	No. in series	Title	Original release date
187	1	"Into The Crystal Caverns"	16 January 2001
Josie and Peter get transported into an educational computer game at their school. Once inside they discover that the game is being controlled by the evil Victor Virus who is intent on finding a way to take over the world. The children, assisted in the real world by Simon and Frances, must stop Virus by completing the various levels of the game.
188	2	"The Castle of Gloom"	23 January 2001
189	3	"The Glen of the Green Man"	30 January 2001
190	4	"No Hope Valley"	6 February 2001
191	5	"The Word Master"	13 February 2001
192	6	"Zzaap Looks Back"	15 February 2001

=== Spelling Strategies (2002) ===
No. overall	No. in series	Title	Original release date
193	1	"Spell It Out 1"	10 January 2002
194	2	"Spell It Out 2"	17 January 2002
195	3	"Spell It Out 3"	24 January 2002

=== Spelling with the Spellits (2002) ===
No. overall	No. in series	Title	Original release date
196	1	"Programme One"	10 September 2002
197	2	"Programme Two"	17 September 2002
198	3	"Programme Three"	24 September 2002
199	4	"Programme Four"	1 October 2002
200	5	"Programme Five"	17 January 2003
201	6	"Programme Six"	24 January 2003
202	7	"Programme Seven (Revision)"	31 January 2003
203	8	"Programme Eight (Revision)"	7 February 2003

=== Shadow Play (2004) ===
No. overall	No. in series	Title	Original release date
204	1	"A Light at the Window"	1 March 2004
Whilst on holiday, Ben discovers a Victorian diary written by a girl named Hester. He finds out what growing up was like in the 19th century and, as the story goes on, he becomes progressively more involved in Hester's situation.
205	2	"The Girl in Blue"	8 March 2004
206	3	"A Flicker at the Fairground"	15 March 2004
207	4	"Phantoms and Photographs"	22 March 2004
208	5	"A Secret Comes to Light"	29 March 2004
