= List of Squeeze band members =

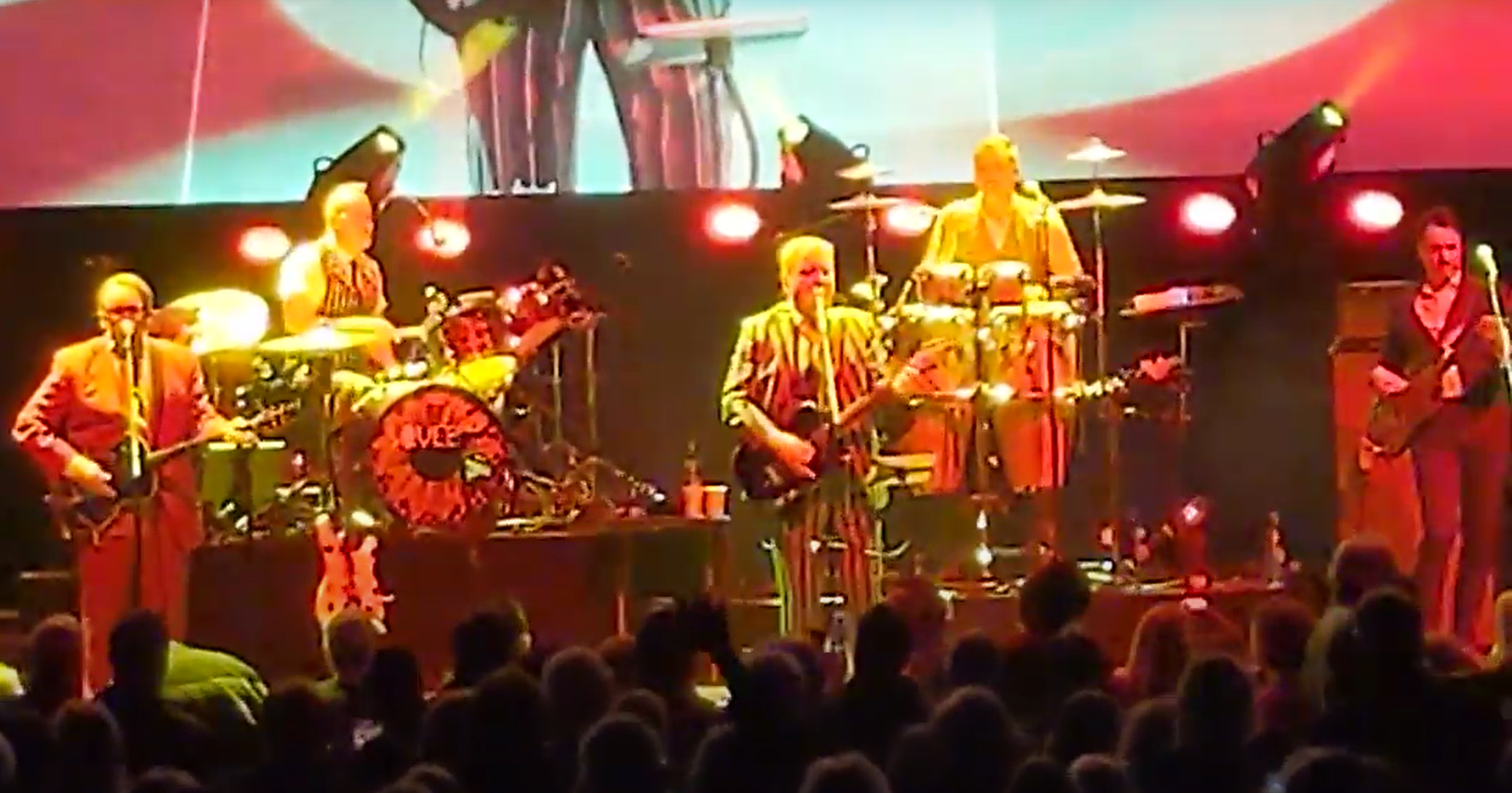
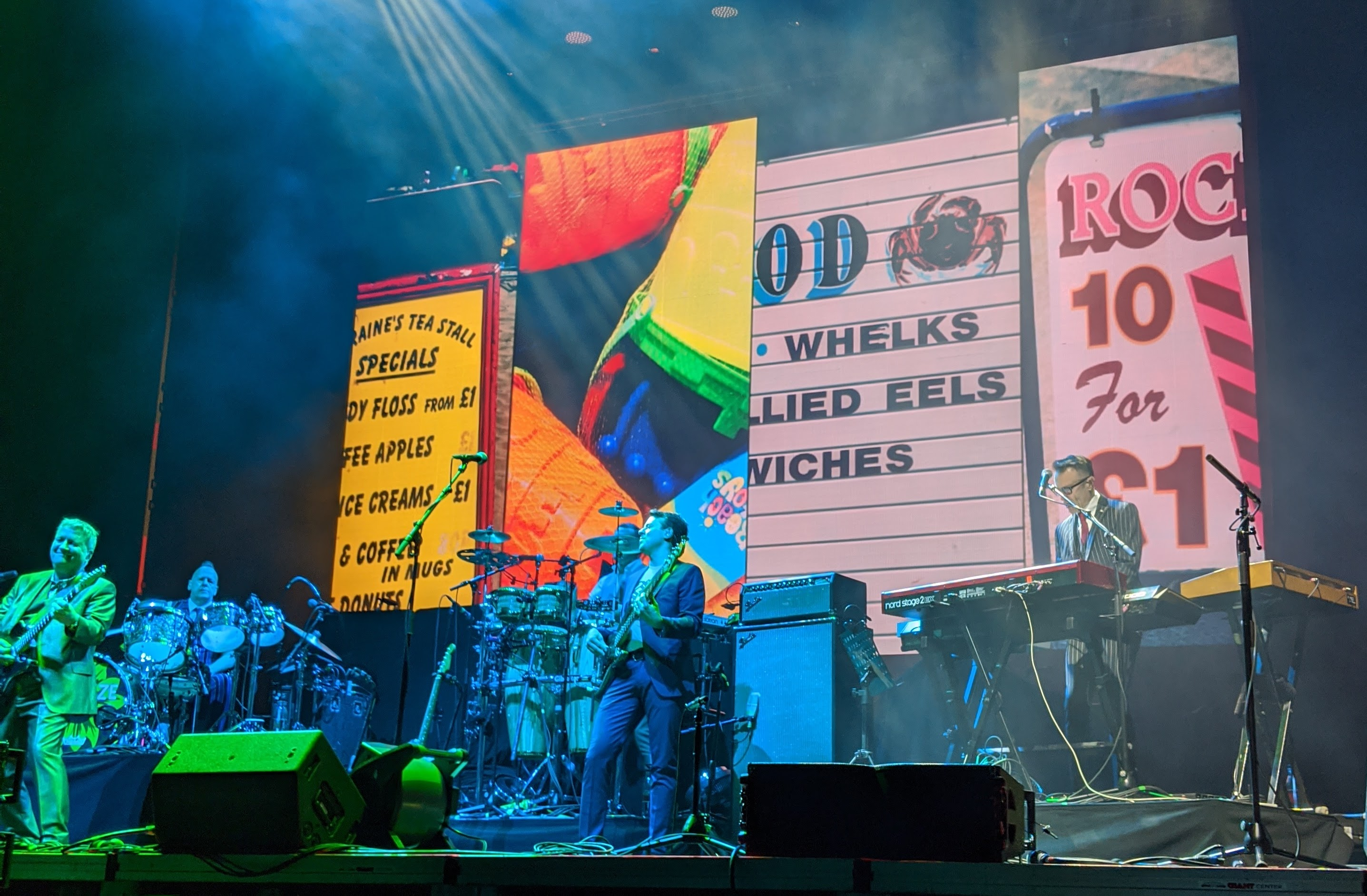
Squeeze performing live in 2020.

Squeeze is an English new wave band from London. Formed in March 1974, the group originally consisted of guitarists and vocalists Glenn Tilbrook and Chris Difford, bassist Harri Kakoulli, keyboardist Jools Holland and drummer Paul Gunn. The group's current lineup features Tilbrook and Difford, drummer Simon Hanson, keyboardist Stephen Large (both of whom joined in 2007), percussionist Steve Smith (since 2017), steel guitarist Melvin Duffy (since 2019) and bassist Owen Biddle (since 2020).

== History ==
=== 1974–1982 ===
Glenn Tilbrook and Chris Difford formed Squeeze in March 1974, initially using several different names including Skyco. They later (circa 1975) completed the lineup with the additions of bassist Harri Kakoulli, keyboardist Jools Holland and drummer Paul Gunn. In 1976, Gunn was replaced by Gilson Lavis, who had previously toured with artists including Chuck Berry, Dolly Parton and Jerry Lee Lewis. The band released their first EP Packet of Three in 1977, followed by their self-titled full-length debut the next year. Shortly after the release of the group's second album Cool for Cats in April 1979, Kakoulli was replaced by John Bentley. The new lineup released the single "Christmas Day" later in the year, followed by their third album Argybargy in early 1980. During the subsequent promotional tour, Holland left in August 1980 to start a solo career.

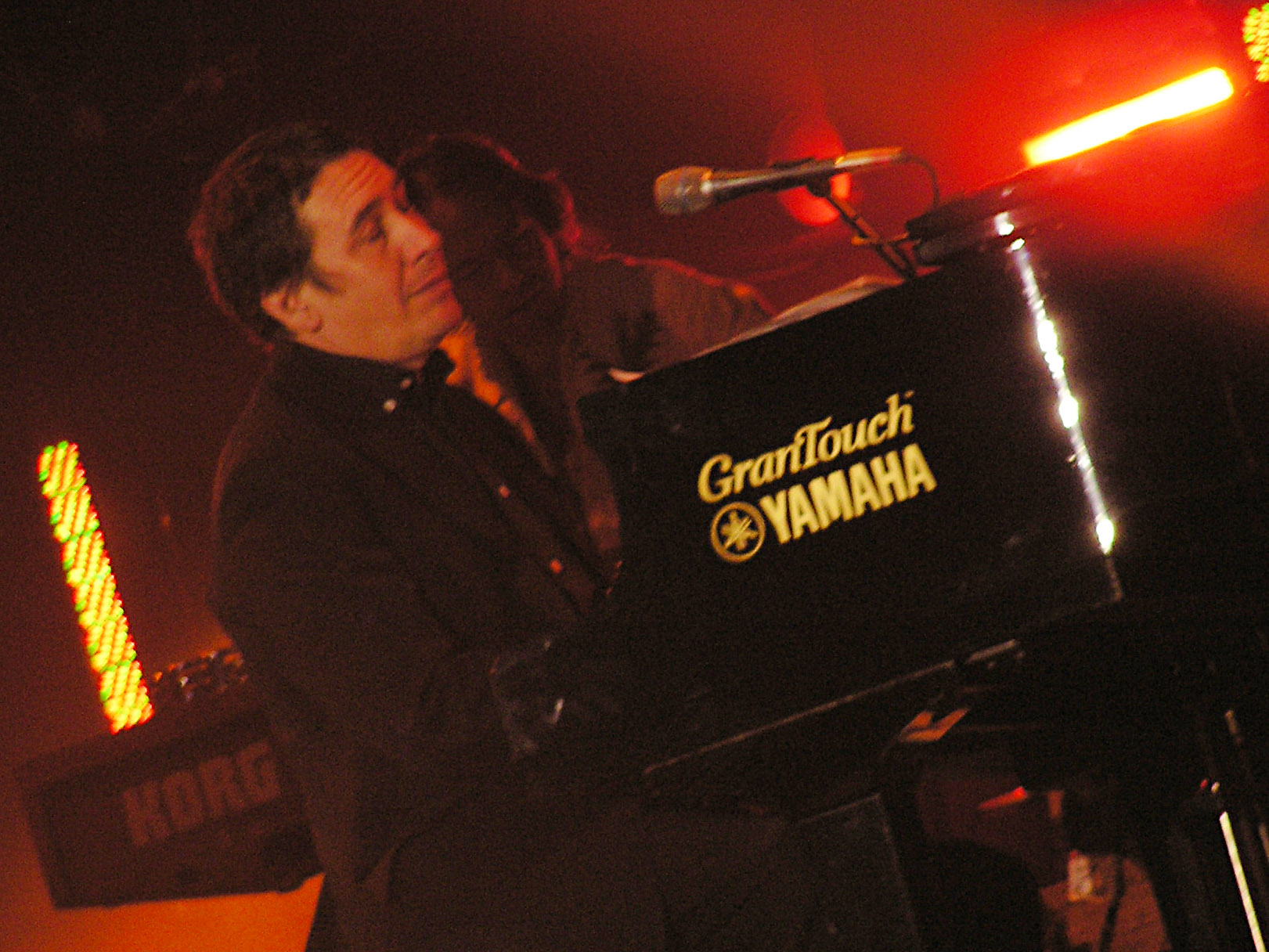
Jools Holland left in 1980 to start a solo career, but rejoined in 1985.

Holland was replaced by Paul Carrack, formerly of Roxy Music, although his appointment was not announced until early 1981. By September that year, after the release and promotion of East Side Story, the keyboardist had left again to join Carlene Carter's backing band. He was replaced a couple of months later by Sinceros keyboardist Don Snow. The new lineup issued Sweets from a Stranger and the single "Annie Get Your Gun" in 1982, before disbanding at the end of the year. The breakup was attributed to Tilbrook and Difford being "Tired of touring and [the band's] frustrating commercial fortunes".

=== 1985–1999 ===
In January 1985, the Argybargy lineup of Squeeze (with Jools Holland returning) reunited for a one-off performance. Tilbrook and Difford subsequently chose to reform the group officially, with Keith Wilkinson taking Bentley's place on bass. After the release of Cosi Fan Tutti Frutti, Holland's brother Christopher joined as a second keyboardist on tour, but was replaced shortly thereafter by Andy Metcalfe. In the summer of 1987, he was made an official member in time for the release of Babylon and On. Metcalfe had left by 1988, with his place taken by Matt Irving. Eighth album Frank was released in 1989.

After a run of shows ending in January 1990, Holland left Squeeze for a second time. The 1991 release Play was subsequently credited to Tilbrook, Difford, Wilkinson and Lavis as a four-piece. For the ensuing concert tour, keyboards were performed by former member Don Snow and new addition Carol Isaacs. By the summer of 1992, Lavis had been replaced by Pete Thomas of the Attractions, while his bandmate Steve Nieve (who contributed to Play) took over on keyboards. Former keyboardist Paul Carrack returned to take over from Nieve in early 1993. In September, the group released their tenth studio album Some Fantastic Place, for which they toured until the end of the year.

For a Japanese tour in early 1994, Carrack (who was touring with Mike and the Mechanics) was temporarily replaced by former keyboardist Andy Metcalfe. In the summer, Squeeze toured the US with Aimee Mann as an additional vocalist and guitarist. The group performed without a drummer after Thomas had joined the reunited Attractions, with returning keyboardist Carrack contributing some percussion. For a string of UK shows later in the year, Andy Newmark joined on drums. In early 1995, Kevin Wilkinson took over for the recording of Ridiculous, while Don Snow rejoined for a third time on the subsequent touring cycle. In 1996, guitarist Nick Harper joined Difford and Tilbrook (billed as Squeeze) for acoustic tours of the UK and USA. Harper continued with the full band as second guitarist and backing vocalist through 1998, while also playing support sets during these tours.

After a short hiatus, the group returned in 1998 with a lineup including Harper, bassist Hilaire Penda, returning keyboardist Christopher Holland (brother of Jools) and drummer Ash Soan.

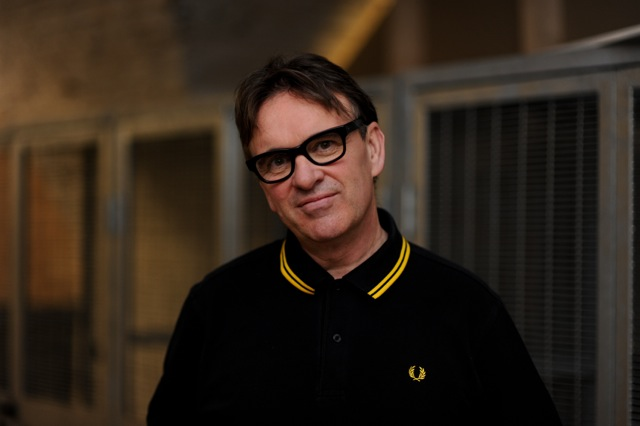
Chris Difford was a constant member of Squeeze until he briefly left during 1999.

During the tour in promotion of new studio album Domino, co-founder Chris Difford abruptly left Squeeze in early 1999, just days prior to the tour's North American leg. Announced initially as a hiatus due to a dislike of travel, it was much later revealed the exit from Squeeze was due to ongoing problems with alcohol abuse. The band continuing for the rest of the year as a quartet. Jim Kimberley replaced Soan as drummer for several shows mid-tour, and for the final few shows of the tour Holland was replaced by Chris Braide. After the tour concluded in November, Squeeze disbanded and Tilbrook and Difford continued working on separate projects.

=== Since 2007 ===
After eight years apart (save for sporadic collaborations), Glenn Tilbrook and Chris Difford reformed Squeeze in early 2007. The rest of the lineup was completed with former bassist John Bentley and new members Stephen Large on keyboards and Simon Hanson on drums. During a UK tour in late 2010, Large was temporarily replaced by Steve Nieve. The group issued two live albums and Spot the Difference, comprising new recordings of old songs, between 2007 and 2012. Personnel remained stable until July 2015, when Bentley left the band by "mutual decision". He was replaced by Lucy Shaw, who completed recording for Cradle to the Grave.

After the release and promotion of their eleventh studio album, Squeeze announced in July 2017 that Shaw had been replaced by Yolanda Charles, and that Steve Smith had joined on percussion, guitar and vocals. Both new members debuted on The Knowledge that year. The group became a seven-piece for the first time in August 2019, when steel guitarist Melvin Duffy – who had performed with the band for several years as a backup member – joined officially. Sean Hurley replaced Charles in February 2020, who was followed by Owen Biddle in April.

As of 2024, Squeeze is an 8-piece, with the addition of Danica Dora on keyboards and backing vocals.

== Members ==
=== Current ===
Image	Name	Years active	Instruments	Release contributions
	Glenn Tilbrook	1974–1982; 1985–1999; 2007–present	lead and backing vocals; lead and rhythm guitars; keyboards; sitar; banjo	all Squeeze releases
	Chris Difford	1974–1982; 1985–1999; 2007–present	rhythm and lead guitars; backing and lead vocals	all Squeeze releases
	Stephen Large	2007–present	keyboards; backing vocals; accordion	all Squeeze releases from Five Live: On Tour in America (2007) onwards
	Simon Hanson	2007–present	drums; percussion; backing vocals	all Squeeze releases from Five Live: On Tour in America (2007) onwards
	Steve Smith	2017–present	percussion; rhythm guitar; backing vocals	all Squeeze releases from The Knowledge (2017) onwards
	Melvin Duffy	2019–present (session and touring member 2015–19)	pedal and lap steel guitars; dulcimer	all Squeeze releases from Cradle to the Grave (2015) onwards
	Owen Biddle	2020–present	bass; backing vocals	Trixies (2026)
	Danica Dora	2024–present	keyboards; backing vocals	Trixies (2026)

=== Former ===
Image	Name	Years active	Instruments	Release contributions
	Julian "Jools" Holland	1974–1981; 1985–1990, 2026 one off performance	keyboards; backing and occasional lead vocals	all Squeeze releases from Packet of Three (1977) to Argybargy (1980), and from Cosi Fan Tutti Frutti (1985) to A Round and a Bout (1990)
	Harri Kakoulli	1974–1979	bass	Packet of Three (1977); Squeeze (1978); Cool for Cats (1979)
	Paul Gunn	1974–1976	drums	none
	Gilson Lavis	1976–1982; 1985–1992; (died 2025)	drums; percussion; backing vocals	all Squeeze releases from Packet of Three (1977) to Play (1991)
	John Bentley	1979–1982; 1985 (one-off); 2007–2015	bass; backing vocals	all Squeeze releases from "Christmas Day" (1979) to "Annie Get Your Gun" (1982), and from Five Live: On Tour in America (2007) to Cradle to the Grave (2015)
	Paul Carrack	1980–1981; 1993–1994; 2010 (one-off)	keyboards; backing and occasional lead vocals; percussion (summer 1994)	East Side Story (1981); Some Fantastic Place (1993); Spot the Difference (2010)
	Don Snow	1981–1982; 1991–1992; 1995–1997	keyboards; backing vocals	Sweets from a Stranger (1982); "Annie Get Your Gun" (1982)
	Keith Wilkinson	1985–1997	bass; backing and occasional lead vocals	all Squeeze releases from Cosi Fan Tutti Frutti (1985) to Ridiculous (1995)
	Pete Thomas	1992–1994	drums	Some Fantastic Place (1993)
	Andy Newmark	1994–1995	drums	none
	Kevin Wilkinson	1995–1997 (died 1999)	drums	Ridiculous (1995)
	Hilaire Penda	1998–1999	bass	Domino (1998)
	Ash Soan	1998–1999	drums; percussion; backing vocals	Domino (1998)
	Christopher Holland	1998–1999 (touring 1985)	keyboards; backing vocals	Cosi Fan Tutti Frutti (1985) – one track only; Domino (1998)
	Lucy Shaw	2015–2017	bass; backing and occasional lead vocals	Cradle to the Grave (2015)
	Yolanda Charles	2017–2020	bass	The Knowledge (2017)

=== Touring ===
Image	Name	Years active	Instruments	Release contributions
	Andy Metcalfe	1985–1988; 1994 (substitute)	keyboards; backing vocals	Babylon and On (1987) – three tracks only
	Matt Irving	1988–1991 (died 2015)	keyboards; accordion; backing vocals	Frank (1989); A Round and a Bout (1990); Play (1991)
	Carol Isaacs	1991–1992	keyboards; backing vocals	none
	Steve Nieve	1992–1993; 2010 (substitute)	keyboards; harpsichord	Play (1991)
	Aimee Mann	1994	rhythm guitar; backing and occasional lead vocals	none
	Nick Harper	1999	rhythm guitar; backing and occasional lead vocals	Domino (1998) – one track only
	Chris Braide	1999	keyboards; backing vocals	Ridiculous (1995)
	Sean Hurley	2019 (substitute); 2020	bass	none

== Lineups ==
Period	Members	Releases
Spring 1974	Glenn Tilbrook – lead guitar, vocals; Chris Difford – rhythm guitar, vocals	none
1974–1976	Glenn Tilbrook – lead guitar, vocals; Chris Difford – rhythm guitar, vocals; Harri Kakoulli – bass; Jools Holland – keyboards, vocals; Paul Gunn – drums	none
1976 – March 1979	Glenn Tilbrook – lead guitar, vocals; Chris Difford – rhythm guitar, vocals; Harri Kakoulli – bass; Jools Holland – keyboards, vocals; Gilson Lavis – drums, backing vocals	Packet of Three (1977); Squeeze (1978); Cool for Cats (1979)
March 1979 – August 1980	Glenn Tilbrook – lead guitar, vocals; Chris Difford – rhythm guitar, vocals; John Bentley – bass, backing vocals; Jools Holland – keyboards, vocals; Gilson Lavis – drums, backing vocals	"Christmas Day" (1979); Argybargy (1980)
Autumn 1980 – September 1981	Glenn Tilbrook – lead guitar, vocals; Chris Difford – rhythm guitar, vocals; John Bentley – bass, backing vocals; Paul Carrack – keyboards, vocals; Gilson Lavis – drums, backing vocals	East Side Story (1981)
November 1981 – November 1982	Glenn Tilbrook – lead guitar, keyboards, vocals; Chris Difford – rhythm guitar, vocals; John Bentley – bass, backing vocals; Don Snow – keyboards, backing vocals; Gilson Lavis – drums, percussion, backing vocals	Sweets from a Stranger (1982); "Annie Get Your Gun" (1982)
Band inactive November 1982 – January 1985
January 1985	Glenn Tilbrook – lead guitar, keyboards, vocals; Chris Difford – rhythm guitar, vocals; John Bentley – bass, backing vocals; Jools Holland – keyboards, vocals; Gilson Lavis – drums, percussion, backing vocals	none
March – summer 1985	Glenn Tilbrook – lead guitar, keyboards, vocals; Chris Difford – rhythm guitar, vocals; Keith Wilkinson – bass, vocals; Jools Holland – keyboards, vocals; Gilson Lavis – drums, percussion, backing vocals	Cosi Fan Tutti Frutti (1985)
Summer – autumn 1985	Glenn Tilbrook – lead guitar, keyboards, vocals; Chris Difford – rhythm guitar, vocals; Keith Wilkinson – bass, backing vocals; Jools Holland – keyboards, vocals; Gilson Lavis – drums, percussion, backing vocals; Chris Holland – keyboards, backing vocals (touring)	none
Autumn 1985 – spring 1988	Glenn Tilbrook – lead guitar, keyboards, vocals; Chris Difford – rhythm guitar, vocals; Keith Wilkinson – bass, backing vocals; Jools Holland – keyboards, vocals; Gilson Lavis – drums, percussion, backing vocals; Andy Metcalfe – keyboards, backing vocals (touring)	Babylon and On (1987)
Summer 1988 – January 1990	Glenn Tilbrook – lead guitar, keyboards, vocals; Chris Difford – rhythm guitar, vocals; Keith Wilkinson – bass, backing vocals; Jools Holland – keyboards, vocals; Gilson Lavis – drums, percussion, backing vocals; Matt Irving – keyboards, backing vocals (touring)	Frank (1989); A Round and a Bout (1990)
Early 1990 – summer 1991	Glenn Tilbrook – lead guitar, keyboards, vocals; Chris Difford – rhythm guitar, vocals; Keith Wilkinson – bass, backing vocals; Gilson Lavis – drums, percussion, backing vocals; Matt Irving – keyboards, backing vocals (touring)	Play (1991)
Summer 1991 – summer 1992	Glenn Tilbrook – lead guitar, keyboards, vocals; Chris Difford – rhythm guitar, vocals; Keith Wilkinson – bass, backing vocals; Gilson Lavis – drums, percussion, backing vocals; Don Snow – keyboards, backing vocals (touring); Carol Isaacs – keyboards, backing vocals (touring)	none
Summer 1992 – early 1993	Glenn Tilbrook – lead guitar, keyboards, vocals; Chris Difford – rhythm guitar, vocals; Keith Wilkinson – bass, backing vocals; Pete Thomas – drums, percussion; Steve Nieve – keyboards, harpsichord (touring)	none
Early 1993 – summer 1994	Glenn Tilbrook – lead guitar, keyboards, vocals; Chris Difford – rhythm guitar, vocals; Keith Wilkinson – bass, backing vocals; Paul Carrack – keyboards, vocals; Pete Thomas – drums, percussion	Some Fantastic Place (1993)
Summer 1994	Glenn Tilbrook – lead guitar, keyboards, vocals; Chris Difford – rhythm guitar, vocals; Keith Wilkinson – bass, backing vocals; Paul Carrack – keyboards, percussion, vocals; Aimee Mann – rhythm guitar, vocals (touring)	none
Late 1994 – early 1995	Glenn Tilbrook – lead guitar, keyboards, vocals; Chris Difford – rhythm guitar, vocals; Keith Wilkinson – bass, backing vocals; Paul Carrack – keyboards, percussion, vocals; Andy Newmark – drums	none
Early – summer 1995	Glenn Tilbrook – lead guitar, keyboards, vocals; Chris Difford – rhythm guitar, vocals; Keith Wilkinson – bass, backing vocals; Kevin Wilkinson – drums, percussion	Ridiculous (1995)
Summer 1995 – early 1997	Glenn Tilbrook – lead guitar, keyboards, vocals; Chris Difford – rhythm guitar, vocals; Keith Wilkinson – bass, backing vocals; Kevin Wilkinson – drums, percussion; Don Snow – keyboards, backing vocals (touring)	none
Early 1997 – spring 1998	Glenn Tilbrook – lead guitar, keyboards, vocals; Chris Difford – rhythm guitar, vocals	"Down in the Valley" (1998)
Spring 1998 – January 1999	Glenn Tilbrook – lead guitar, keyboards, vocals; Chris Difford – rhythm guitar, vocals; Hilaire Penda – bass; Chris Holland – keyboards, backing vocals; Ash Soan – drums, percussion, backing vocals	Domino (1998)
January – October 1999	Glenn Tilbrook – lead guitar, keyboards, vocals; Hilaire Penda – bass; Chris Holland – keyboards, backing vocals; Ash Soan – drums, percussion, backing vocals; Nick Harper – rhythm guitar, vocals (touring)	none
October – November 1999	Glenn Tilbrook – lead guitar, keyboards, vocals; Hilaire Penda – bass; Ash Soan – drums, percussion, backing vocals; Nick Harper – rhythm guitar, vocals (touring); Chris Braide – keyboards, backing vocals (touring)	none
Band inactive November 1999 – March 2007
March 2007 – July 2015	Glenn Tilbrook – lead guitar, keyboards, vocals; Chris Difford – rhythm guitar, vocals; John Bentley – bass, backing vocals; Stephen Large – keyboards, backing vocals; Simon Hanson – drums, percussion, backing vocals	Five Live: On Tour in America (2007); Spot the Difference (2010); Live at the Fillmore (2012); Packet of Four (2012); Cradle to the Grave (2015) – five tracks
August 2015 – July 2017	Glenn Tilbrook – lead guitar, keyboards, vocals; Chris Difford – rhythm guitar, vocals; Lucy Shaw – bass, vocals; Stephen Large – keyboards, backing vocals; Simon Hanson – drums, percussion, backing vocals	Cradle to the Grave (2015) – remaining tracks
July 2017 – August 2019	Glenn Tilbrook – lead guitar, keyboards, vocals; Chris Difford – rhythm guitar, vocals; Yolanda Charles – bass; Stephen Large – keyboards, backing vocals; Simon Hanson – drums, percussion, backing vocals; Steve Smith – percussion, backing vocals	The Knowledge (2017)
August 2019 – February 2020	Glenn Tilbrook – lead guitar, keyboards, vocals; Chris Difford – rhythm guitar, vocals; Melvin Duffy – steel guitars, dulcimer; Yolanda Charles – bass; Stephen Large – keyboards, backing vocals; Simon Hanson – drums, percussion, backing vocals; Steve Smith – percussion, backing vocals	none
February – April 2020	Glenn Tilbrook – lead guitar, keyboards, vocals; Chris Difford – rhythm guitar, vocals; Melvin Duffy – steel guitars, dulcimer; Sean Hurley – bass (touring); Stephen Large – keyboards, backing vocals; Simon Hanson – drums, percussion, backing vocals; Steve Smith – percussion, backing vocals	none
April 2020 – present	Glenn Tilbrook – lead guitar, keyboards, vocals; Chris Difford – rhythm guitar, vocals; Melvin Duffy – steel guitars, dulcimer; Owen Biddle – bass, backing vocals; Stephen Large – keyboards, backing vocals; Simon Hanson – drums, percussion, backing vocals; Steve Smith – percussion, backing vocals	none to date
