= Cradle to the Grave (disambiguation) =

"Cradle to the Grave" is a 1994 song by Tupac Shakur.

Cradle to the Grave, or similar, may also refer to:

== Music ==
- "Cradle to the Grave", a 1987 song by Motörhead from the single "Eat the Rich"
- "Cradle to the Grave", a 1995 song by Mobb Deep from The Infamous
- Cradle to the Grave (album), a 2015 album by Squeeze
- Cradle to the Grave (soundtrack), the soundtrack album to 2003 film Cradle 2 the Grave

== Film and television ==
- Cradle 2 the Grave, a 2003 action film
- Cradle to Grave, a 2015 sitcom based on a fictionalised version of the autobiography of Danny Baker
- "Cradle to Grave" (Homicide: Life on the Street), a 1995 television episode
- "Cradle to Grave", a 2008 episode of the TV series Back to You

== Miscelleanous ==
- Cradle-to-grave analysis or life cycle assessment, an analysis of the environmental impact of a product or service
- Whole-life cost, or "cradle to grave" cost, the total cost of ownership over the life of an asset
- The cradle-to-grave marketing strategy

== See also ==
- From the Cradle to the Grave (disambiguation)
- Beveridge Report, an influential document in the founding of the welfare state in the United Kingdom
