= Spot the Difference =

Studio album / Greatest hits album by Squeeze
- Released: 3 August 2010
- Genres: New wave; power pop
- Length: 52:34
- Label: XOXO
- Producers: Andrew J. Jones & Glenn Tilbrook

Squeeze chronology
Domino (1998)	Spot the Difference (2010)	Cradle to the Grave (2015)

Spot the Difference is a 2010 album by the British new wave group Squeeze. It is the band's thirteenth studio album and consists entirely of new recordings of older Squeeze songs. The songs are arranged as similarly as possible to the original recordings, being done in such a way to invite the listener to 'spot the difference'.

== Details ==
This is Squeeze's first studio album in 12 years, and introduces new members Stephen Large (keyboards) and Simon Hanson (drums) to the fold. Spot the Difference also marks the return of bassist John Bentley to the group; he last played on a Squeeze studio album 28 years previously (1982's Sweets from a Stranger). As well, former Squeeze member Paul Carrack guests on vocals and keyboards on the remake of "Tempted". On the re-record of "Loving You Tonight", Tilbrook sings the lead vocal that Carrack sang on the original version.

Chris Difford went on to explain in an interview in the Huffington Post (6 August 2010) the reason for the release: "Well, Squeeze has never owned our own copyrights because, obviously, they're owned by a major record label. We thought it might be fun to re-record our songs to make it possible for us to own a little bit more of our own history. So, Glenn went in the studio, and did most of the work. I have to bow down to his achievements as a producer because he's done a great job of making them sound pretty much like the originals."

The album was initially released in the US in August 2010. When released in the UK two months later, it was packaged with a bonus disc of live recordings titled Live at The Fillmore.

== Reception ==
Professional ratings
Review scores
Source	Rating
Allmusic	2.5/5 stars
Record Collector	3/5 stars
Rolling Stone	2/5 stars

Mark Kemp of Rolling Stone was largely dismissive of Spot the Difference, proclaiming the record "completely superfluous" and alleging it to be a "cynical ploy to sell an oldies tour". Steven Erlewine of Allmusic, meanwhile, felt that the CD was "a fun spin for the devoted and a good advertisement for Squeeze’s reunion tour".

== Track listing ==
All songs written by Chris Difford and Glenn Tilbrook.

1. "Another Nail in My Heart" 3:00
2. "Black Coffee in Bed" 6:08
3. "Cool for Cats" 3:10
4. "Goodbye Girl" 3:00
5. "Hourglass" 3:16
6. "Is That Love" 2:32
7. "Labelled with Love" 4:30
8. "Loving You Tonight" 4:09
9. "Pulling Mussels (from the Shell)" 3:59
10. "Slap and Tickle" 4:12
11. "Some Fantastic Place" 4:41
12. "Take Me I'm Yours" 2:47
13. "Tempted" 4:01
14. "Up the Junction" 3:09

(Note that the songs are sequenced in alphabetical order.)

=== UK Bonus Disc: Live at the Fillmore ===
1. "Take Me I'm Yours"
2. "Annie Get Your Gun"
3. "Black Coffee in Bed"
4. "When the Hangover Strikes"
5. "Loving You Tonight"
6. "If It's Love"
7. "It's So Dirty"
8. "Goodbye Girl"
9. "Hope Fell Down"
10. "If I Didn't Love You"

== Personnel ==
Squeeze

- Chris Difford – guitar, vocals
- Glenn Tilbrook – guitars, keyboards, vocals
- John Bentley – bass, vocals
- Simon Hanson – drums
- Stephen Large – keyboards

with:

- Paul Carrack – keyboards, vocals
- Andrew J. Jones – synthesizer, percussion
- Bob Litten, Paul Pott, Ray Tabor – horns
- Phil Veacock – saxophone
- Alexandra Baybutt, Bryan Chambers, Derek Green, Suzanne Hunt, Jean-Marie Lincoln, Siobhan Parr, Louis Tilbrook – backing vocals
