= The Knowledge (album) =

Studio album by Squeeze
- Released: 13 October 2017
- Genres: Alternative rock; baroque pop; country rock; rock; soul
- Length: 46:58
- Label: Love
- Producers: Glenn Tilbrook, Laurie Latham, Andrew Jones

Squeeze chronology
| Cradle to the Grave (2015) | The Knowledge (2017) | Trixies (2026) |

Professional ratings
Aggregate scores
| Source | Rating |
|---|---|
| Metacritic | 81/100 |
Review scores
| Source | Rating |
| AllMusic | 4/5 stars |
| Express & Star | 5/10 |
| Glide Magazine | 9/10 |
| MusicOMH | 4/5 stars |

The Knowledge is the fifteenth studio album, and the fourteenth album of original material, by British rock band Squeeze, released on 13 October 2017. It is the only Squeeze album to feature Yolanda Charles on bass after the departure of bassist Lucy Shaw.

== Critical reception ==
Stephen Thomas Erlewine of AllMusic rated The Knowledge positively; in a four out of five-star review, he proclaimed the record "a masterly latter-day work".

== Track listing ==
All tracks are written by Chris Difford and Glenn Tilbrook.

| No. | Title | Length |
|---|---|---|
| 1. | "Innocence in Paradise" | 5:09 |
| 2. | "Patchouli" | 3:45 |
| 3. | "A&E" | 3:39 |
| 4. | "Every Story" | 3:32 |
| 5. | "Rough Ride" | 4:18 |
| 6. | "Departure Lounge" | 5:14 |
| 7. | "Final Score" | 3:57 |
| 8. | "Please Be Upstanding" | 3:59 |
| 9. | "The Ones" | 3:47 |
| 10. | "Albatross" | 2:10 |
| 11. | "Elmers End" | 2:59 |
| 12. | "Two Forks" | 4:29 |

== Personnel ==
Squeeze

- Glenn Tilbrook – lead vocals, guitar, keyboards
- Chris Difford – guitar on 1; backing vocals on 1, 2, 3, 4, 6, 7, 8, 10, 12
- Yolanda Charles – bass
- Stephen Large – keyboards
- Simon Hanson – drums
- Steve Smith – percussion; backing vocal on 8

with:

- Seamus Beaghen – additional keyboards on 1, 2, 3, 4, 7, 9, 11, 12
- Melvin Duffy – pedal steel guitar on 1, 2, 7, 8, 9, 11, 12
- Dennis Greaves – guitar on 11
- Paul Jordanous – trumpet on 3
- Frank Mead – saxophone on 3, 5, 11
- Chris Rand – saxophone on 3
- Matt Winch – flugelhorn/trumpet on 3, 5, 11
- Cara McHardy – operatic vocals on 5
- Billie Godfrey, Bryan Chambers, Louise Marshall, Simon King – backing vocals on 2, 3, 5, 7

Musicians on track 10:

- Glenn Tilbrook – vocals, guitar, finger cymbals, handclaps
- Chris Difford – vocals
- Ted Tilbrook – bass
- Andrew Jones – bongos, handclaps
- Louis Tilbrook – celesta
- Chris McNally – harmonium

== Charts ==
| Chart (2017) | Peak position |
|---|---|
| Scottish Albums (Official Charts) | 21 |
| UK Albums (Official Charts) | 25 |
