= Trixies =

Studio album by Squeeze
- Released: 6 March 2026
- Length: 41:36
- Labels: BMG; Love
- Producer: Owen Biddle Glenn Tilbrook (exec. producer)

Squeeze chronology
The Knowledge (2017)	Trixies (2026)

Trixies is the sixteenth studio album by British rock band Squeeze. It was released on 6 March 2026, through BMG Rights Management and Love Records. The album consists of material written by the band's main songwriters Chris Difford and Glenn Tilbrook in 1974, at the ages of 19 and 16, respectively. This marks their first album release in over eight years since The Knowledge (2017). The album debuted at No.15 on the UK album charts.

== Track listing ==
All tracks are written by Chris Difford and Glenn Tilbrook, except "The Dancer" and "It's Over" (written by Difford).

Trixies track listing
No.	Title	Length
1.	"What More Can I Say"	3:32
2.	"You Get the Feeling"	2:43
3.	"The Place We Call Mars"	3:27
4.	"Hell on Earth"	3:02
5.	"The Dancer"	3:10
6.	"Good Riddance"	3:12
7.	"Don't Go Out in the Dark"	3:48
8.	"Why Don't You"	2:45
9.	"Anything but Me"	2:59
10.	"It's Over (Note: Squeeze previously issued a completely different song also titled "It's Over" as a single in 1994. That song was a minor UK hit (peaking at #89), and is unrelated to this one.)"	3:08
11.	"The Jaguars"	3:11
12.	"Trixies, Pt. 1"	2:49
13.	"Trixies, Pt. 2"	3:50
Total length:		41:36

== Personnel ==
Credits adapted from Tidal.

=== Squeeze ===
- Owen Biddle – bass, production (all tracks); additional vocals (tracks 2–4, 8, 11, 13), engineering (6, 7), drum machine (7, 8, 12), drums (7, 12), arrangement (10, 13)
- Chris Difford – lead vocals (3–11, 13)
- Danica Dora – additional vocals (2–4, 7, 8, 10, 11, 13), arrangement (3, 6, 10, 13), backing vocals (6)
- Melvin Duffy – additional vocals (2, 3), guitar (2, 10), lap steel guitar (5, 11), pedal steel guitar (6, 9)
- Simon Hanson – drums (1–11)
- Stephen Large – Moog (1, 4), piano (1), keyboards (2, 4), organ (4, 5, 7, 10, 12), Mellotron (5, 6), harpsichord (6, 9), Clavinet (11)
- Steve Smith – percussion (all tracks), additional vocals (2, 4, 7, 8, 12, 13), backing vocals (6)
- Glenn Tilbrook – production (all tracks), lead vocals (1–4, 6–9, 11–13), electric guitar (1, 2, 4, 5, 7–13), Moog (1, 5, 13), organ (1, 8), arrangement (2–4, 6, 8), additional vocals (2–4, 7–9, 11, 13), electric piano (2); backing vocals, lead guitar (3, 6); Mellotron (3, 8, 9); acoustic guitar, Stylophone (3); vibraphone (6, 9), celeste (6, 12), drums (8), keyboards (12), piano (13), synthesizer (13)

=== Additional contributors ===
- Bob Clearmountain – engineering
- Chris McNally – engineering
- Chris Potter – engineering
- Ira Becker – engineering
- John Harry Green – electric guitar (1)
- Tiger Braun-White – piano (3), cello (5)
- Dan Miley – electric guitar (3, 12)
- Jeff Coffin – saxophone (12, 13)
- Steve White (drummer) - drums (12,13)

== Charts ==
Chart performance for Trixies
Chart (2026)	Peak position
Scottish Albums (Official Charts)	3
UK Albums (Official Charts)	15
UK Independent Albums (Official Charts)	1
