= Bang Bang (Squeeze song) =

Single by Squeeze

from the album Squeeze
- Released: May 1978 (UK)
- Recorded: 1977
- Length: 2:03
- Label: A&M
- Songwriters: Glenn Tilbrook and Chris Difford
- Producer: Squeeze

Squeeze singles chronology
"Take Me I'm Yours" (1978)	"Bang Bang" (1978)	"Goodbye Girl" (1978)

"Bang Bang" is the second single by Squeeze released from their debut album Squeeze.

== Background ==
"Bang Bang" was one of two songs on Squeeze's debut album that the band produced without the album's primary producer John Cale, who was "too ill to work" at the time according to Chris Difford. Difford and Tilbrook had written the song at a cafe in Greenwich near the home that the two shared at the time.

Difford claimed that the song "was written after a heavy week of sulphate abuse when all I could hear was my heart going bang-bang, bang-bang." Like the band's 1987 single "853-5937", "Bang Bang" is a song that Squeeze mainstays Glenn Tilbrook and Chris Difford are not fond of. Tilbrook opined, "I think the song's rubbish. Like all novelty songs, it had its moment. I think we thought it tremendously funny at the time but I have to say I don't laugh anymore." Difford was more ambivalent, stating, "I used to disown tracks [like 'Bang Bang'] ... [but] I listen to 'Bang Bang' now and respect it because it sums up the attitude of us at the time."

== Release ==
"Bang Bang" was released as the second single from the band's debut album, following "Take Me I'm Yours", the other song on the album that the band produced without Cale. Tilbrook later commented, "We recorded both this and 'Take Me I'm Yours' when John was ill and they ended up as the two singles from the album, which tells you all you need to know really". The song peaked at number 49 on the UK Singles Chart.

Due to Difford and Tilbrook's distaste for the song, it has largely been omitted from compilation albums. Despite this, the group have occasionally revived the song in their live setlists, starting in 2012. In an interview from that year, Difford reflected, "What's been happening over the last five years is, Glenn and I are re-investigating our history, and we're putting songs in the set that I never, ever thought we'd be playing at this stage in our lives—songs like 'Revue' and 'The Knack' and 'Bang Bang'. We felt that we had to move on, and to move on we sort of moved back."

== Track listing ==
1. "Bang Bang" (2:03)
2. "All Fed Up" (4:00)
