= Cradle to the Grave (album) =

Studio album by Squeeze
- Released: 2 October 2015
- Genre: Pop
- Length: 44:32
- Labels: Virgin EMI, Love
- Producers: Glenn Tilbrook, Laurie Latham

Squeeze chronology
Spot the Difference (2010)	Cradle to the Grave (2015)	The Knowledge (2017)

Cradle to the Grave is the fourteenth studio album, and the thirteenth album of original material, by British rock band Squeeze. It was released in October 2015 and is their first studio album since 2010's Spot the Difference. It also features their first new songs since their 1998 album Domino. It is the only Squeeze album to feature bassist Lucy Shaw who departed before the band's 2017 album, The Knowledge, which features Yolanda Charles on bass. Cradle to the Grave debuted at number 12 on the UK Albums Chart, making this the band's highest-charting album excluding hits compilations.

== Music ==
Stephen Thomas Erlewine wrote that Cradle to the Grave was "a pop album first and foremost".

== Reception ==
Professional ratings
Review scores
Source	Rating
AllMusic	4/5 stars

Stephen Thomas Erlewine of AllMusic concluded a praising 4-out-of-5-star review by complementing Cradle to the Grave as an "affirmation of Difford and Tilbrook's special chemistry as songwriters and bandleaders".

== Track listing ==
All songs written by Chris Difford and Glenn Tilbrook, except as indicated.

1. "Cradle to the Grave" – 3:20
2. "Nirvana" – 3:55
3. "Beautiful Game" – 3:25
4. "Happy Days" – 4:36
5. "Open" – 3:46
6. "Only 15" – 3:11
7. "Top of the Form" – 3:05
8. "Sunny" – 2:59
9. "Haywire" – 3:52
10. "Honeytrap" – 3:30
11. "Everything" – 4:06
12. "Snap, Crackle and Pop" – 4:52

=== Bonus tracks ===
Deluxe edition tracks exclusive to both the vinyl and digital download releases.

13. "Hangin' ' Round" (Lou Reed) – 7:22
14. "Harper Valley PTA" (Tom T. Hall) – 3:28
15. "This Strange Effect" (Ray Davies) – 5:32
16. "I Don't Wanna Grow Up" (Tom Waits, Kathleen Brennan) – 2:52

== Personnel ==
Squeeze

- Glenn Tilbrook – vocals, guitars, keyboards, bass, percussion, handclaps
- Chris Difford – acoustic guitar, vocals
- Lucy Shaw – bass on 2, 4, 6, 7, 12; backing vocals on 11
- Stephen Large – keyboards (except on 8)
- Simon Hanson – drums; backing vocals on 7

with:

- John Bentley – bass on 1, 3, 9, 10, 11
- Melvin Duffy – pedal steel guitar on 3, 9, 11; dulcimer on 11
- Mark Feltham – harmonica on 10
- Dennis Greaves – lead guitar on 10
- Laurie Latham – tambourine, assorted percussion

Backing vocals and handclaps:

- Kelly Barnes – backing vocals on 1, 2, 4, 5, 6, 12
- Bryan Chambers – backing vocals on 2, 4, 5, 6, 12
- Miles Connolly – backing vocals on 7
- Carly Dexter-Fry – backing vocals on 7
- Billie Godfrey – backing vocals on 1, 2, 4, 5, 6, 12
- Dominic Haddad – backing vocals on 7
- Jane Homer – backing vocals on 7, handclaps on 2
- Suzanne Hunt – backing vocals on 7, handclaps on 2
- Nate James – backing vocals on 1
- Simon King – backing vocals on 2, 4, 5, 6, 12
- Bryan Marshall – backing vocals on 1
- Louise Marshall – backing vocals on 1, 2, 4, 5, 6, 12
- Melanie Marshall – backing vocals on 1, 2, 4, 5, 6, 12
- Leon Tilbrook – backing vocals on 3
- Louis Tilbrook – backing vocals on 7, handclaps on 2

Strings on 2, 5, 12:

- Tom Pigott-Smith – leader, Everton Nelson, Stephanie Benedetti, Matt Ward, Calina De La Mare, Lucy Wilkins, Oli Langford, Ian Rathbone, Ian Burdge, Ben Rogerson

Strings on 8:

- Kirsty Mangan, Stephanie Benedetti, Natalie Holt, Rachel Lander
