= Packet of Three =

EP by Squeeze
- Released: July 1977, November 1979 (reissue)
- Recorded: April 1977
- Studios: Pathway Studios, London
- Genre: Rock
- Length: 8:33
- Label: Deptford Fun City
- Producer: John Cale

Squeeze chronology
Packet of Three (1977)	Squeeze (1978)

Packet of Three was the first release from the new wave rock band Squeeze. It contained three songs produced by John Cale of the Velvet Underground, who also produced their self-titled debut LP the following year. Packet of Three was released in both 7" and 12" vinyl formats. (The 12" did not have a picture sleeve) The EP's title comes from the UK term for a standard package of condoms. The photo on the sleeve of the EP was taken outside a pub in Haddo Street, Greenwich, SE London, close to the council flat at 35 Congers House, Bronze Street, Deptford, where Chris Difford was staying at the time.

The three songs were re-released in 1990 on the "Annie Get Your Gun" CD single (IRS 74007).

== Reception ==
Professional ratings
Review scores
Source	Rating
AllMusic	2/5 stars

AllMusic's retrospective review deemed that the EP "while quite raw compared to later material, showed enough promise to land the band a recording contract with A&M Records."

"Cat on a Wall" gained its first radio play in June 1977 on legendary North Sea pirate station Radio Caroline who gave the song extensive airplay. Jools Holland was a school friend of Radio Caroline DJ Mark Lawrence.

== Track listing ==
All songs written by Chris Difford and Glenn Tilbrook

1. "Cat on a Wall" – 3:10
2. "Night Ride" – 3:02
3. "Back Track" – 2:21

== Personnel ==
Squeeze

- Glenn Tilbrook - lead guitar, vocals
- Chris Difford - guitar, vocals
- Julian Holland - keyboards, vocals
- Harri Kakoulli - bass
- Gilson Lavis - drums

Technical

- Jill Furmanovsky - photography, design
