= From the Cradle to the Grave =

From the Cradle to the Grave may refer to:

- From the Cradle to the Grave (album), a 1983 album by the Subhumans, or the title song
- From the Cradle to the Grave (DVD), an unofficial biography of the band Cradle of Filth
- From the Cradle to the Grave, an album by Dale Watson
- "From the Cradle to the Grave", a song by Crispy Ambulance
- "From the Cradle to the Grave", a song by German heavy metal band Rage from the album XIII
- Von der Wiege bis zum Grabe (From the Cradle to the Grave), the 13th and last symphonic poem, S. 107 (1881–2), by Franz Liszt

== See also ==
- Cradle to the Grave (disambiguation)
- Beveridge Report
