= Take Me I'm Yours =

1978 single by Squeeze

Single by Squeeze

from the album Squeeze
- Released: 3 February 1978 (UK)
- Recorded: 1977
- Genre: Power pop; synth-pop
- Length: 2:45
- Label: A&M
- Songwriters: Chris Difford and Glenn Tilbrook
- Producers: Squeeze, John Cale

Squeeze singles chronology
| "Take Me I'm Yours" (1978) | "Bang Bang" (1978) |

"Take Me I'm Yours" is the debut single by the English new wave band Squeeze. It established the band's trademark vocal style, with Chris Difford singing an octave lower than Glenn Tilbrook.

== Background ==
"Take Me I'm Yours" was one of the first songs the band had written. As Chris Difford recalled, "[It was] written very early on in our career. I don't know a lot of songs lyrically I find that it takes a while to discover what they're about. You write them down, they're almost negatives of a photograph that need to develop and with that one, it's still developing." The song has been described by writers as "synth-pop" and one of Squeeze's "power pop hits", differentiating it from the punk style of much of the band's first album; Difford later named the song one of the only tracks on the album that was representative of Squeeze.

Lyrically, the song features images of exotic locations and travels. Difford was inspired to write these lyrics after visiting the home of the band's manager, Miles Copeland: "I was staying at my manager's house and his mother was or is an archaeologist. And she'd worked a lot in Egypt where Miles went to school. She had pictures and matching ornaments from that part of the world, and it inspired that kind of lyric. But it changed into a very different song over the years."

The song's synth arrangement led the song to be described by author Mark Spicer as possibly the first recording by a UK group featuring a drum machine. Tilbrook explained of the song's sound: "We hired lots of synths and a bloke who knew how to work them and pretended to be Kraftwerk." Tilbrook cited engineer John Wood as "very helpful" in that he "knew how to rein in what we were producing and gave us some structure". Wood would go on to co-produce the band's subsequent two studio albums.

== Release ==
"Take Me I'm Yours" was released as the first single from the band's debut 1978 album Squeeze. The track peaked at number 19 in the UK Singles Chart in May 1978. The single's success not only established Squeeze as a new wave player, but provided manager Copeland the leverage to negotiate a favorable deal with A&M Records for another band he was managing: the Police, featuring his brother Stewart on drums.

Record World said that "the synthesizer underpinnings make this offbeat love song stand out; it's a bit like 10cc."

The band filmed a music video for the song. Tilbrook later singled out the video for featuring him using "a 1959 Strat" that he described as the "first proper guitar" he ever had. He commented, "It was a lovely guitar and the best Strat I ever had. ... It played like a dream but was stolen."

In 1998, the song was used in an American television commercial for Dockers jeans.

== Track listing ==
1. "Take Me I'm Yours" (2:45)
2. "Night Nurse" (2:43)

== Cover versions ==
The song has been covered several times, including a unique take by Tim Curry on his 1981 album Simplicity, and more recently by Andrea Corr on her album Ten Feet High.
