= Squeeze (Squeeze album) =

Studio album by Squeeze
- Released: March 1978
- Recorded: 1977
- Studio: Morgan, London; Pathway, London; Surrey Sound, Leatherhead
- Genre: New wave; pop rock; post-punk; punk rock; power pop
- Length: 41:44
- Label: A&M
- Producer: John Cale, Squeeze

Squeeze chronology
Packet of Three (1977)	Squeeze (1978)	Cool for Cats (1979)

Singles from Squeeze
- 1. "Take Me I'm Yours" Released: 5 February 1978; 2. "Bang Bang" Released: May 1978

Squeeze is the debut studio album released by the English group Squeeze. The album title was simply Squeeze in the United Kingdom, but in the United States, Canada, Australia and other countries, the album, like the band, was marketed under the name U.K. Squeeze to avoid confusion with similarly-named American and Australian groups.

The LP was produced by John Cale, except for "Take Me I'm Yours" and "Bang Bang" (also the only singles released from the LP). Those songs were produced by the band.

== Writing and recording ==
According to Glenn Tilbrook the process for making their first album was rewarding but also frustrating: "For me, U.K. Squeeze wasn’t really very representative of what we were doing at the time. When we worked with John Cale in the studio, he threw out all the songs that we had written. When most bands make their first album, they go in and do a lot of stuff that’s been going down well in their sets; well, that wasn’t the case with us. He told us to write new songs – which we did. He was an inspirational guy to work with, but I felt that it was almost like we were writing for what he wanted rather than what the band itself was. When you’re in a position to be making a first album, it’s (A) awe-inspiring to be making an album, and (B) difficult to assert yourself against somebody who knows the ropes."

In his autobiography, Difford said, "Cale walked in and sat down, and asked us to play for him. We raced through twelve new songs; he fell asleep. We prodded him but he wouldn't wake up, so we moved the PA closer to his head and ploughed on. Still no life. Then Jools grabbed a marker pen and wrote 'I am a cunt' on his forehead. We woke him up and sent him in a cab back to his hotel. The next day, he came back to the room. The writing was still clearly visible on his head, though it was a little faded, but nothing was said."

Chris Difford's approach to writing the lyrics for the album was different as well. According to an interview with Bud Scoppa, Difford found the process of working with their producer John Cale to be challenging: "I remember, he came up and said, 'Lyrically, you’re quite soft; have you ever thought about writin’ about musclemen?' I said, 'That’s never occurred to me, actually.' And he said, 'Well, go away and do it – I wanna see songs like that on the album.' So my perception of what the band was at that point was completely different from the way he saw it, obviously. He had us doing some awfully strange things."

== Music ==
A record consisting of material written on the orders of producer John Cale, Stephen Thomas Erlewine said that Squeeze had a "chaotic" sound. Robert Christgau described the record a "hard rock" effort.

== Release ==
The initial A&M Canada and A&M U.S. LP pressings were released on limited edition red vinyl.

In 1997, the CD was released in the UK with two bonus tracks, as part of the Six of One... box set. The set included the band's first six studio albums, each digitally remastered. These CDs were made available for individual purchase in 1998.

In 2007, the album was digitally remastered and released in Japan. It contains 4 bonus tracks, one of which is a single edit of Take Me I'm Yours. The other bonus tracks are taken from B-sides from the singles of the album. It also contains the bonus tracks from the 1997 re-release.

== Critical reception ==
Professional ratings
Review scores
Source	Rating
Allmusic	2.5/5 stars
Christgau's Record Guide	B
The Village Voice	B

Village Voice critic Robert Christgau wrote: "Musically, the instrumental is the only boring cut on the whole first side, but the record as a whole is a case study in excitingly adequate hard rock craftsmanship spoiled by trashy literature. When a band obviously influenced by Queen, Rock Scene, muscle mags, and boarding-school porn finishes off by advising their postpunk admirers to 'get smart,' it sounds like they want 'em to stop reading Hustler and start reading Oui."

The album received a negative retrospective review from Allmusic, who said that producer John Cale forced Squeeze to pursue a musical direction that ran contrary to their inclinations. They singled out the two tracks produced by the band themselves as the only ones which show any sign of the artistic success they would later reach.

== Track listing ==
All songs written by Chris Difford and Glenn Tilbrook except as indicated.

1. "Sex Master" – 2:21
2. "Bang Bang" – 2:04
3. "Strong in Reason" – 4:14
4. "Wild Sewerage Tickles Brazil" (Squeeze) – 3:49
5. "Out of Control" – 4:44
6. "Take Me I'm Yours" – 3:50
7. "The Call" – 5:17
8. "Model" – 2:59
9. "Remember What" – 2:51
10. "First Thing Wrong" – 3:43
11. "Hesitation (Rool Britannia)" – 3:45
12. "Get Smart" – 2:06

=== Bonus Tracks (1997 reissue) ===
13. "Deep Cuts" – 4:04
14. "Heartbreak" – 4:54

=== Bonus Tracks (2007 Japanese Remaster) ===
1. "Take Me I'm Yours" (Single Version) – 2:45
2. "Night Nurse" – 2:43
3. "All Fed Up" – 4:00

== Personnel ==
Squeeze

- Chris Difford – rhythm guitar, vocals
- Glenn Tilbrook – lead guitar, vocals
- Jools Holland – keyboards
- Harry Kakoulli – bass
- Gilson Lavis – drums

Technical

- Gregg Jackman, John Wood – engineering
