= Domino (Squeeze album) =

Studio album by Squeeze
- Released: November 1998
- Studios: 45 RPM Studios (Blackheath, London); Heliocentric Studio (Rye, Sussex)
- Genre: Rock
- Length: 46:59
- Label: Quixotic
- Producer: Glenn Tilbrook

Squeeze chronology
Ridiculous (1995)	Domino (1998)	Spot The Difference (2010)

Domino is the twelfth studio album by the British new wave group Squeeze. After a career struggling with various major record labels, the band decided to record and release Domino independently, on Glenn Tilbrook's own Quixotic Records. Core members Tilbrook and Chris Difford were joined by three brand new Squeeze members for this album: drummer Ashley Soan, bassist Hilaire Penda, and keyboardist Christopher Holland (Jools's younger brother).

The album was hastily made, and received negative reactions from critics. Difford and Tilbrook have both since denounced Domino as a weak effort, marred by time constraints and increasing friction between the two songwriters. Difford chose not to join a 1999 tour due to concerns related to his history of alcoholism, after which Squeeze disbanded. The album did not appear in the UK Albums Chart; their first to fail to do so.

== Reception ==
Professional ratings
Review scores
Source	Rating
Allmusic	2/5 stars

Stephen Thomas Erlewine of AllMusic was highly dismissive of the record, calling it a "disappointment" and a "dud", further commenting that "all the familiar elements are in place, but nothing really clicks".

== Track listing ==
All songs written by Chris Difford and Glenn Tilbrook.

1. "Play On" – 3:39
2. "Bonkers" – 3:43
3. "What's Wrong with This Picture?" – 3:24
4. "Domino" – 4:34
5. "To Be a Dad" – 4:10
6. "Donkey Talk" – 4:27
7. "Sleeping with a Friend" – 4:55
8. "Without You Here" – 3:28
9. "In the Morning" – 3:34
10. "A Moving Story" – 3:11
11. "Little King" – 3:33
12. "Short Break" – 4:20

== Personnel ==
Squeeze

- Chris Difford – guitars, vocals
- Glenn Tilbrook – vocals, keyboards, programming, loops, guitars
- Chris Holland – acoustic piano, organ, keyboards, vocals
- Hilaire Penda – bass
- Ashley Soan – drums, vocals

Additional personnel

- Jessica Rowan – recorder (1)
- Nick Harper – guitars (10)
- Sukie Green – additional vocals (5)
- Jeff Harvey – additional vocals (12)

Production

- Glenn Tilbrook – producer, mixing
- Neil Amor – engineer, mixing
- Patrick Moore – engineer
- Roger Wake – mastering at Bourbery-Wake Studios
- Sukie Green – design
- Jimmy Gaston – front cover photography, additional photography
- Sandrine Albert – additional photography
- Simo Bogdanovic – additional photography
- Julian Woodfield – additional photography
