= Stephen Large =

English musician

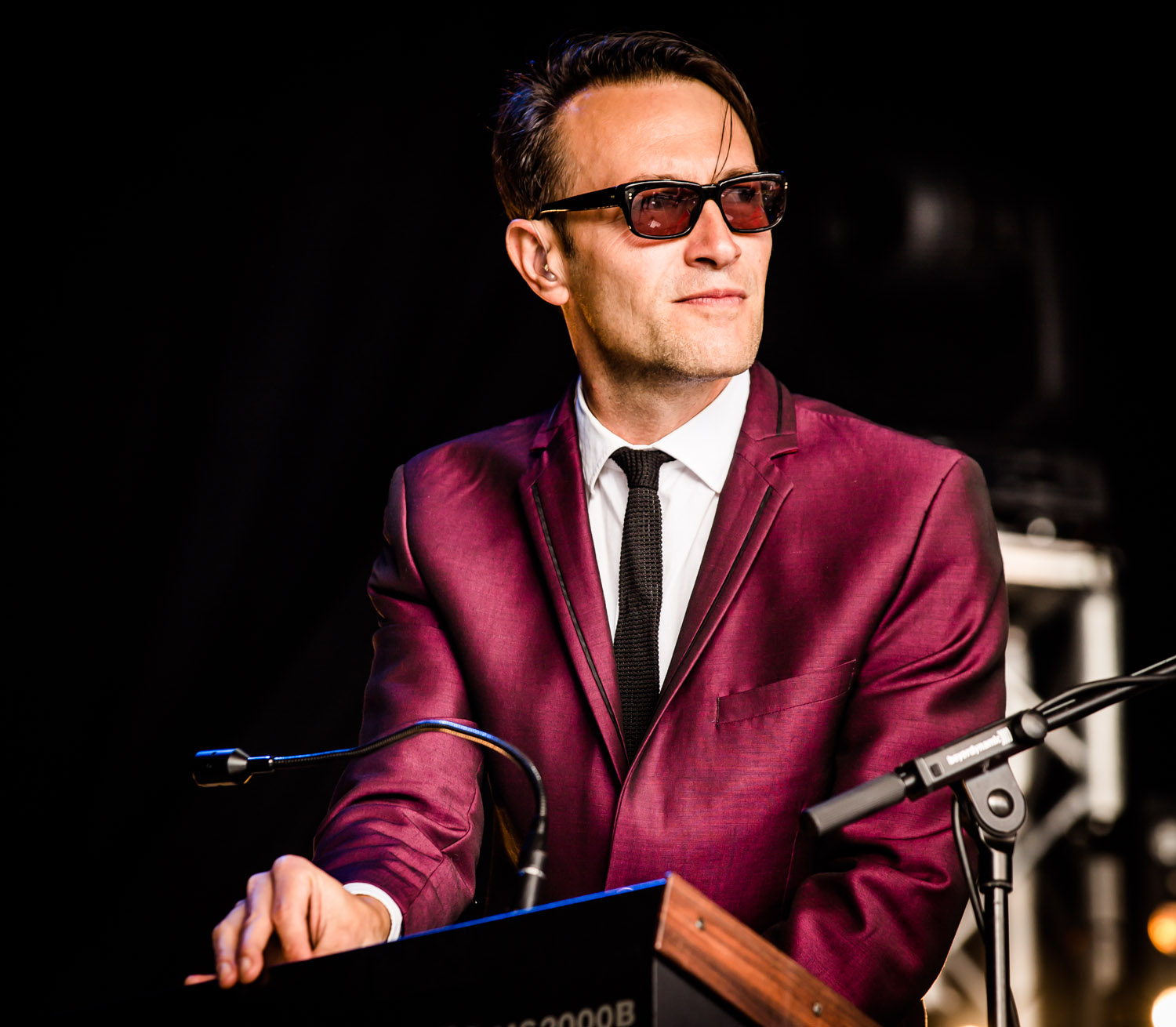
- Large with Squeeze in 2014

Background information
- Occupations: Keyboardist, composer and arranger
- Instrument: Keyboards
- Website: stephenlarge.com

Stephen Large is an English, London-based keyboard player, composer, arranger, and long-term member of UK band Squeeze.

== Biography ==
As well as his work with Squeeze, Stephen Large is musical director (touring keyboard player and arranger) for Caro Emerald. He was previously musical director for pop artists Rebecca Ferguson and Duffy.

As a keyboard player, Large has worked with Paul Heaton and Jacqui Abbott, most recently contributing keyboards for their Number One album Manchester Calling. Other keyboard work includes Paloma Faith, Rumer, Pete Doherty, Babyshambles, the Noisettes, Johnny Depp, cabaret with Alan Carr, music hall with Colin Firth, and others, as well as being a founder member of jazz outfits The Rag 'n' Bone Club and Ronnie Scott's Rejects.

Large received web prominence after an appearance with Squeeze on the US Jimmy Fallon Show on 13 July 2010, during which he played a keyboard solo on the new Apple iPad for the song "Pulling Mussels (From The Shell)". This appears to be the first use on live TV of the iPad as a musical instrument. Further TV credits include The Jay Leno Show with Duffy, Britain's Got Talent with Rebecca Ferguson, The Ellen DeGeneres Show with Squeeze, Parkinson with Rod Stewart, dueting with Glenn Tilbrook on Later... with Jools Holland, and appearing in CBBC's Big Babies.

He left Christchurch College, Canterbury with a first-class degree in art and music, and had an early breakthrough with the band Koot, who were initially signed to the Warner Records label, releasing a single album Skyjacked through Some Bizzare in 2001. Koot also contributed the song "Sunshine at Last" to the soundtrack of the film Saving Grace. After a spell as keyboard player for the Mercury-Award-nominated and Q-Award-winning band The Electric Soft Parade, Large contributed his skills to recordings by The Ordinary Boys, Graham Coxon, The Shortwave Set, Sonny J, Simply Red, Lucky Soul and Marina and the Diamonds, amongst others. He is also a long-term member of Glenn Tilbrook's The Fluffers, for whom he has co-written songs with the Squeeze frontman.

Co-writing credits include music for the BBC's Cradle to Grave (a 2016 comedy series featuring Peter Kay), Billy Connolly's Billy's Route 66 (2011), the CBBC TV show Big Babies, and the BBC's Wimbledon coverage (2008 and 2009), as well as song writing with Chris Difford, Andrea Britton, Imelda May, and his own band Lord Large. Large has worked with a range of producers including John Williams, Liam Howe, Jon Kelly, Steve Booker, Andy Wright, Jim Abbiss, Stephen Street, Dangermouse and others.

Stephen Large has also produced string and brass arrangements for Noisettes, CocknBullKid, Marina and the Diamonds, Squeeze and Clare Teal.

Lord Large is the result of a collaboration with drummer, writer and producer Andrew J Jones, with whom Large has worked since their days in Koot. The group's debut album The Lord's First XI, released on the Acid Jazz Records label, has been championed by Paul Weller, Mark Lamarr, Robert Elms and Gary Crowley, and has seen Large working with a range of soul singers, including Clem Curtis of The Foundations, Dean Parrish, Linda Lewis and The Peddlers' Roy Phillips, as well as the more contemporary talents of Squeeze's Glenn Tilbrook, Andrea Britton and ex-Freakpower trombonist Ashley Slater.

During a short break from Squeeze starting September 2010, Large was temporarily replaced by Steve Nieve (previously of Elvis Costello and the Attractions), before re-joining the band for a performance at the Royal Albert Hall, as part of the annual Teenage Cancer Trust concerts on 22 March 2011.

== Selected discography ==
- 2022 Jo O'Meara + The Celebs - Thriller (song) (Produced by Grahame Corbyn | Jack Corbyn | arrangement by Stephen Large)
- 2021 Shona McGarty + The Celebs - Let It Be (song) (Produced by Grahame Corbyn | Jack Corbyn | assistant producer Stephen Large)
- 2020 Paul Heaton + Jacqui Abbott – Manchester Calling (produced by John Williams)
- 2018 Paul Heaton + Jacqui Abbott – The Last King of Pop
- 2017 Caro Emerald – Emerald Island
- 2017 Paul Heaton + Jacqui Abbott – Crooked Calypso (produced by John Williams)
- 2017 Squeeze – The Knowledge (produced by Laurie Latham, Glenn Tilbrook and Andrew Jones)
- 2017 Petula Clark – Living for Today (keyboards and writing credit)
- 2015 Rebecca Ferguson – Lady Sings the Blues (keyboards and arrangements)
- 2015 Squeeze – Cradle to the Grave (produced by Glenn Tilbrook and Laurie Latham)
- 2014 Paul Heaton & Jacqui Abbott – What Have We Become? (produced by John Williams)
- 2013 Babyshambles – Sequel to the Prequel (produced by Stephen Street)
- 2013 Rebecca Ferguson – Freedom (arranger and keyboard credits)
- 2011 Rebecca Ferguson – Heaven (production and keyboard credits)
- 2011 Squeeze – Spot the Difference (produced by Jones/Tilbrook)
- 2010 CocknBullKid – Adulthood (produced by Liam Howe)
- 2010 Marina and the Diamonds – The Family Jewels (produced by Liam Howe)
- 2010 Lucky Soul – A Coming of Age (produced by Andy Laidlaw)
- 2009 Noisettes, Film Soundtrack for Nine (produced by Steve Booker)
- 2009 Simply Red (new album demos produced by Andy Wright)
- 2009 Noisettes – Wild Young Hearts (produced by Jim Abiss)
- 2009 Pete Doherty – Grace/Wastelands (produced by Stephen Street)
- 2009 Glenn Tilbrook & the Fluffers Pandemonium Ensues (produced by Tilbrook/Clearmountain)
- 2008 Soundtrack for film Definitely, Maybe (solo piano, produced by Adam Brooks)
- 2008 Sonny J – Disastro (produced by Kyle/Farrell)
- 2008 Squeeze – Quintessential (produced by Difford/Tilbrook)
- 2008 The Shortwave Set – Replica Sun Machine (produced by Dangermouse)
- 2007 Lord Large – The Lord's First XI (produced by Jones/Large)
- 2007 Babyshambles – Shotter's Nation (produced by Stephen Street)
- 2006 Graham Coxon – Love Travels at Illegal Speeds (produced by Stephen Street)

== Keyboards ==
A collector and player of vintage and other keyboards, Stephen Large uses the following instruments:

- Elysian Grand Piano
- Gallanti accordion (1960s)
- Hammond Organ A100
- Hammond Organ L122
- Hammond melodica
- Clavinet Mk.I
- Hohner Clavinet Mk.II
- Hohner melodicas
- Kawai MP 10 electric piano
- Kawai MP 7 electric piano
- Korg MS2000 Synthesiser
- Nord Stage 3 Compact
- Nord Stage 2 EX HP76
- Nord Stage 2 SW73
- Mellotron M4000D Mini
- Moog Prodigy Synthesiser
- Minimoog Model D
- Moog Sub 37
- Phillicorda electric organ
- Rhodes Mk.1 Electric Piano
- Roland Juno 6 Synthesiser
- Roland RD2000 piano
- Roland AX-Edge Keytar
- Wurlitzer 200 Electric Piano
- Various Leslie Speakers
- B&H Euphonium
- Yamaha Valve Trombone
