= Squeeze (band) =

English rock band

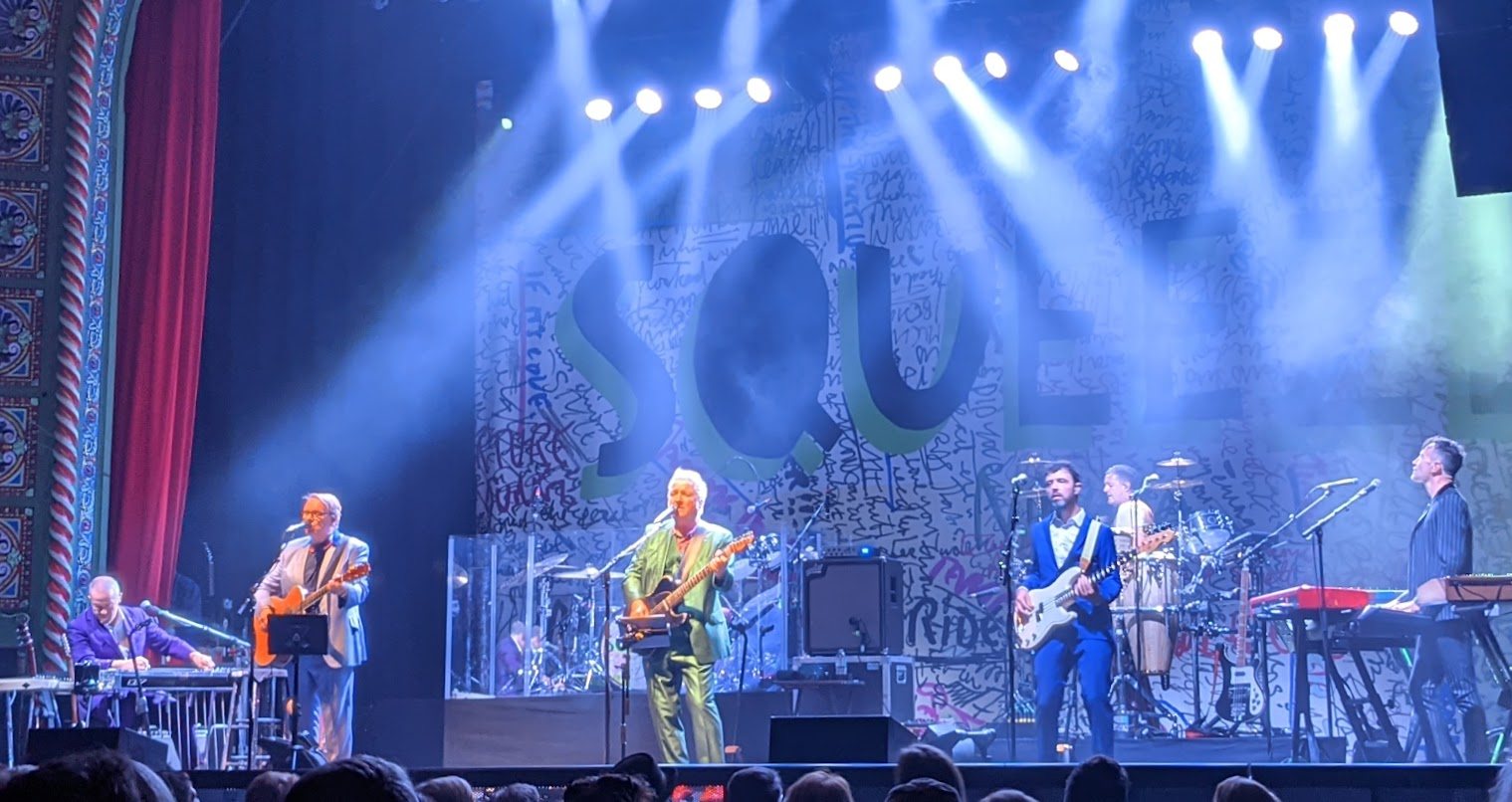
- Squeeze performing in 2021

Background information
- Origin: London, England
- Genres: New wave; pop rock; post-punk; power pop
- Years active: 1974–1982; 1985–1999; 2007–present
- Labels: A&M; I.R.S.; Ark 21; Reprise; Quixotic
- Spinoffs: Difford & Tilbrook; Glenn Tilbrook & the Fluffers; Jools Holland and his Rhythm & Blues Orchestra
- Members: Glenn Tilbrook; Chris Difford; Stephen Large; Simon Hanson; Steve Smith; Melvin Duffy; Owen Biddle; Danica Dora
- Past members: Jools Holland; Harri Kakoulli; Paul Gunn; Gilson Lavis; John Bentley; Paul Carrack; Don Snow; Keith Wilkinson; Andy Metcalfe; Matt Irving; Carol Isaacs; Steve Nieve; Pete Thomas; Andy Newmark; Aimee Mann; Kevin Wilkinson; Hilaire Penda; Ash Soan; Chris Holland; Nick Harper; Chris Braide; Lucy Shaw; Yolanda Charles; Sean Hurley
- Website: squeezeofficial.com

Squeeze are an English rock band that came to prominence in the United Kingdom during the new wave period of the late 1970s, and continued recording in the 1980s, 1990s and 2010s. In the UK, their singles "Cool for Cats", "Up the Junction", and "Labelled with Love" were top-ten chart hits. Though not as commercially successful in the United States, Squeeze had American hits with "Tempted", "Black Coffee in Bed", and "Hourglass", and were considered a part of the Second British Invasion.

The vast majority of their material is written by Chris Difford (lyrics) and Glenn Tilbrook (music) who are guitarists and vocalists in the band, and the group's only consistent members. The duo were hailed as "the heirs to Lennon and McCartney's throne" during the band's initial popularity in the late 1970s. The group formed in Deptford, London, in 1974, and first broke up in 1982. Squeeze then reformed in 1985, and disbanded again in 1999. The band, which has included more than 30 musicians over the years amidst constant line-up changes, has also been noted as a launchpad for the successful careers of their former keyboard players (and occasional vocalists) Jools Holland and Paul Carrack.

The band reunited for tours through the United States and United Kingdom in 2007. In 2010, they issued Spot the Difference, an album of newly recorded versions of older material. The band's first album of all-new material since 1998, 2015's 'Cradle to the Grave, became their highest-charting album of original material (i.e., excluding "greatest hits" compilations) in the UK. The band continues to record and release new music, including The Knowledge (2017) and Trixies (2026), as well as tour.

== Career ==
=== First incarnation: 1974–1982 ===
The band's founding members in March 1974 were Chris Difford (guitar, vocals, lyrics), and Glenn Tilbrook (vocals, guitar, music). Difford claims that in 1973, he stole 50p from his mother's purse to put a card in a local sweetshop window to advertise for a guitarist to join his band, although he was not actually in a band at the time. Tilbrook was the only person who responded to the advertisement. Difford and Tilbrook began writing songs together, and soon added Jools Holland (keyboards) and Paul Gunn (drums) to form an actual band. The group performed under several names, most frequently "Captain Trundlow's Sky Company" or "Skyco", before selecting the band name "Squeeze" as a facetious tribute to the Velvet Underground's oft-derided 1973 album Squeeze.

Gilson Lavis replaced Gunn on drums, and Harri Kakoulli joined on bass in 1975.

Squeeze's early career was spent around Deptford in south-east London, where they were part of a lively local music scene which included Alternative TV and Dire Straits. Though the group was initially signed to Miles Copeland III's BTM Records, the label went under in late 1976, and so their early singles and debut EP, 1977's Packet of Three, were released on the Deptford Fun City label.

Squeeze's first EP and most of their self-titled debut album (1978) were produced by John Cale for A&M Records. Cale had been a member of Velvet Underground from whose album Squeeze took their name. However, the debut album's two hit singles ("Take Me I'm Yours" and "Bang Bang") were produced by the band themselves, as the label found Cale's recordings uncommercial.

In the United States and Canada, the band and album were dubbed UK Squeeze owing to legal conflicts arising from a contemporary American band called "Tight Squeeze". The "UK" was dropped for all subsequent releases. In Australia, the same name change was used due to legal conflicts arising from an existing Sydney-based band also called "Squeeze". The Australian band had only released one album, The Squeeze Is On, in 1978, alongside several singles. In spite of this, the English band's albums in Australia were credited to UK Squeeze up to and including 1985's Cosi Fan Tutti Frutti.

The band's second album, Cool for Cats (1979), contained the band's two highest charting UK singles in "Cool For Cats" and "Up The Junction", both of which peaked at No. 2. John Bentley replaced Harry Kakoulli on bass in 1979 following the release of the LP.

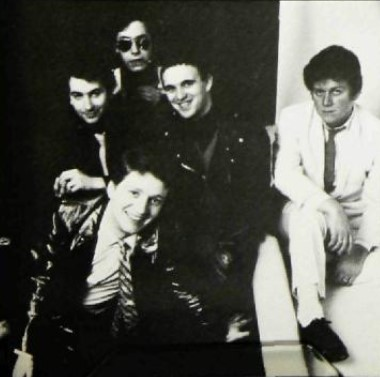
The band in April 1979. Top: Jools Holland, middle (left to right): John Bentley, Chris Difford, Gilson Lavis, bottom row: Glenn Tilbrook.

Argybargy (1980), the band's third album, was also a UK hit. It was additionally a mild breakthrough in North America, as the single "Another Nail in My Heart" was a No. 56 hit in Canada, and second single "Pulling Mussels (from the Shell)" received airplay on US rock radio stations. The video for the former was frequently shown on independent video music shows in the US.

Holland left for a solo career in 1980. He was replaced by Paul Carrack, formerly of the rock band Ace and the art rock band Roxy Music.

In 1981, the band released East Side Story. It was produced by Elvis Costello and Roger Bechirian, and featured Carrack's lead vocals on the radio hit "Tempted". Carrack himself left after the release of East Side Story, and was replaced by Don Snow. It also spawned another top 5 hit, the country influenced "Labelled with Love", which reached No.4 in the UK, and No.2 in Ireland. This line-up recorded the Sweets from a Stranger LP in 1982. Negative reviews, the stresses of touring, and conflict between band members led Difford and Tilbrook to break up the band later that year, after releasing a final single, "Annie Get Your Gun".

=== Difford & Tilbrook duo: 1983–1984 ===
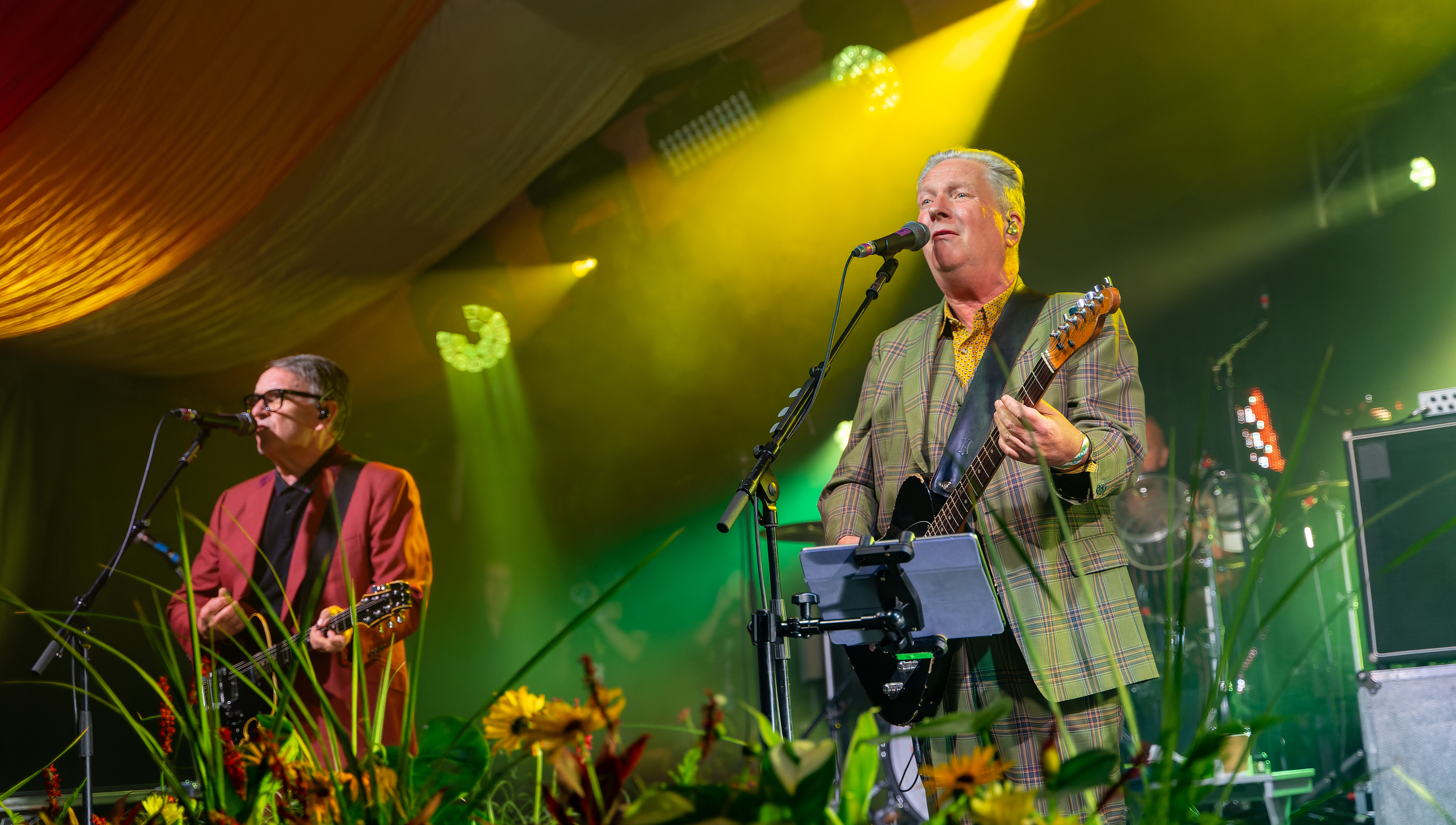
Difford and Tilbrook in 2023

Difford and Tilbrook continued to work together, and released one self-titled album as the duo Difford & Tilbrook in 1984. Although it is not officially a Squeeze album, to many fans Difford & Tilbrook is considered a "lost" Squeeze LP because Difford and Tilbrook were themselves the only constant members of Squeeze. Several Difford & Tilbrook tracks have been featured on officially sanctioned Squeeze compilations, and Tilbrook's official site lists Difford & Tilbrook as a Squeeze album.

The duo also contributed to a musical written and staged in Deptford during this period, entitled Labelled with Love and based in large part on the music of Squeeze.

=== Second incarnation: 1985–1999 ===
Squeeze re-formed to play a one night charity gig in 1985, with all five members from the 1980 Argybargy period—Difford, Tilbrook, Holland, Lavis, and Bentley. The performance was such a success that the band unanimously agreed to resume recording and touring as Squeeze. Searching for a different sound, the band replaced Bentley with bassist Keith Wilkinson from the Difford & Tilbrook sessions. This line-up released the 1985 LP Cosi Fan Tutti Frutti.

The new LP featured complex double-tracked keyboard parts which could not be duplicated by a single keyboard player in a live setting; hence, Jools' brother Christopher Holland, then aged 17, played and toured as a second keyboardist in 1985. Christopher had also played Hammond organ on the album's fourth single "Heartbreaking World", which was sung by Jools Holland. However, Christopher Holland's tenure was short-lived, for he had signed to I.R.S. Records and was pursuing a solo career, so he was replaced by an official new member: Andy Metcalfe of The Soft Boys and The Egyptians. A bassist in those groups, Metcalfe played keyboards with Squeeze. His tenure as the band's sixth member lasted until 1988.

In 1987, the sextet recorded the album Babylon and On. A successful release on both sides of the Atlantic, this album contained the band's only US top 40 hits in "Hourglass" and "853-5937".

Metcalfe left the band in 1988, leaving the Difford / Tilbrook / Holland / Wilkinson / Lavis line-up to record 1989's Frank. The LP was a commercial disappointment, from which no charting singles were taken in the UK, and the band was dropped from their long-time label A&M.

Adding a new second keyboard player in the person of Matt Irving, the band issued the live album A Round and a Bout on I.R.S. Records in March 1990. Jools Holland left Squeeze again in early 1990, and was not immediately replaced. In his stead, the band used session musicians such as Irving (who was no longer an official band member), Steve Nieve, and Bruce Hornsby for the 1991 release Play, which came out on the Reprise label. This release again spawned no UK hits, although in the US the singles "Satisfied" and "Crying in My Sleep" received significant airplay on modern rock stations, and in Canada "Satisfied" was a top 50 hit. However, Reprise dropped the band after this album. Following this, drummer Gilson Lavis was let go in 1992, and replaced by Nieve's Attractions bandmate Pete Thomas. Paul Carrack also returned to the band in 1993.

Squeeze re-signed to A&M in time for 1993's Some Fantastic Place. After a period of commercial decline in the UK, lead single "Third Rail" hit No. 39, becoming Squeeze's first UK Top 40 hit in six years.

Squeeze's line-up during the mid-1990s changed constantly. The American songwriter Aimee Mann toured as part of the band in 1994, playing both Mann and Squeeze songs. Thomas exited the band that year, and Carrack doubled on snare and keyboards for a few gigs before session drummer Andy Newmark was brought in. Then—still in 1994—Carrack left, which allowed keyboardist Andy Metcalfe to return to the band for a short spell, playing on some live dates. Drummer Kevin Wilkinson (no relation to bassist Keith), formerly of The Waterboys and China Crisis, was also added around this time, replacing Newmark. He lasted through the 1995 album Ridiculous, which was recorded by the quartet of Difford, Tilbrook, Wilkinson and Wilkinson. The album spun off three minor hits in the UK: "This Summer", "Electric Trains" and "Heaven Knows". ("Heaven Knows" was used as the closing song in the 1995 film Hackers starring Angelina Jolie.) In addition, a minimally remixed version of "This Summer" became a No. 32 UK hit in 1996, a year after the original version peaked at No. 36. Despite this, A&M once again dropped Squeeze from their roster in late 1996.

Following the release of Ridiculous, Don Snow (now known as Jonn Savannah) returned to Squeeze yet again as their touring keyboard player, but by 1997, the Squeeze line-up had officially dwindled down to just Difford and Tilbrook. That year the duo, billed as Squeeze, released the non-album single "Down in the Valley" as a fundraising single for Charlton Athletic F.C. Tilbrook formed the Quixotic label for this and future Squeeze-related releases, as well as releases by other artists.

For the 1998 album Domino, the band was again a quintet consisting of Difford, Tilbrook, bassist Hilaire Penda, ex-Del Amitri drummer Ashley Soan, and yet another returning keyboardist in the person of Christopher Holland. Nick Harper often performed with this version of Squeeze as a guest touring musician, providing additional guitar and vocals. In January 1999, just days before a planned tour, Chris Difford suddenly announced that he was taking a "hiatus" from Squeeze. The last venue at which Squeeze played with Difford was at The Charlotte, Leicester, England. The band subsequently continued as a quartet led by Tilbrook, with Jim Kimberley replacing Soan on some tour dates, and Christopher Holland exiting in the autumn to be replaced by Tilbrook's other frequent writing partner Chris Braide.

On 27 November 1999, in Aberdeen, Scotland, Squeeze played their final gig before breaking up again. Difford and Tilbrook embarked on separate solo careers shortly thereafter.

=== Solo years: 2000–2006 ===
In 2003 Difford and Tilbrook collaborated on a song for the first time since Domino. The track "Where I Can Be Your Friend" appeared on Tilbrook's well-reviewed second solo album, Transatlantic Ping Pong. In 2004, the pair worked with music journalist Jim Drury on the retrospective Squeeze: Song By Song. In this book they declared they had become better friends since breaking up the band than they ever were while Squeeze was together.

However, a 2004 attempt by the VH1 show Bands Reunited to reassemble the mid-1980s line-up of Squeeze (Difford, Tilbrook, Holland, Wilkinson and Lavis) ended in failure. While Difford and bassist Keith Wilkinson were both favourable to the idea and drummer Gilson Lavis expressed interest, Jools Holland felt he was too busy with current projects to participate. Even more crucially, Glenn Tilbrook eventually decided against a band reunion at that point in time.

Still, Difford and Tilbrook's friendship continued, and Difford sat in for a few songs at a Tilbrook solo gig in Glasgow in December 2005.

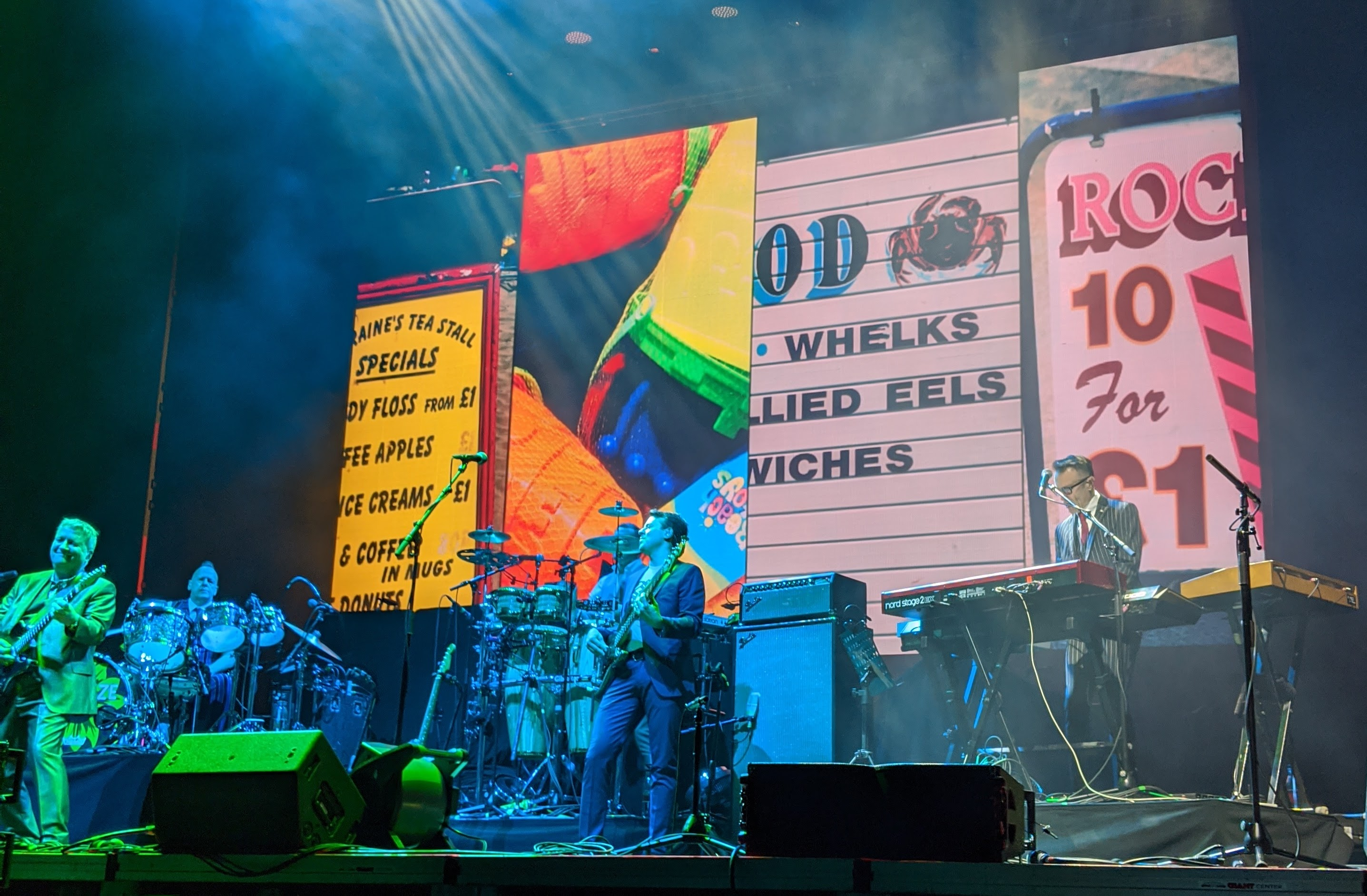
Squeeze performing in 2020

=== Third incarnation: 2007–present ===
In early 2007 it was announced that Difford and Tilbrook would re-form Squeeze for a series of shows throughout the latter half of the year, in support of Universal and Warner's re-issuing of the band's back catalogue and the release of a new 'best of' album, Essential Squeeze, on 30 April. Jools Holland and Gilson Lavis were unable to take part in the series of shows, as they were touring under the "Jools Holland & His Rhythm & Blues Orchestra" name for most of the year. However, John Bentley re-joined on bass for the first time since Squeeze's last reunion show in 1985. The rest of the line-up was fleshed out by members of Tilbrook's touring band, the Fluffers: Stephen Large (keyboards) and Simon Hanson (drums).

On 7 July 2007, at the "Return to the Summer of Love Party" at Hawkhurst, Kent, Difford and Tilbrook, each singing and playing acoustic guitars, played a seven-song set. They played, in order, "Take Me I'm Yours", "Pulling Mussels (From the Shell)", "Is that Love?", "Tempted", "Labelled with Love", "Cool for Cats" and "Up the Junction". The first actual full-band Squeeze show since 1999 took place less than a week later, at their old haunt The Albany (in Deptford) on Thursday 12 July; this was actually billed as a "warm up" gig prior to the upcoming US tour, and was followed by GuilFest 2007. They toured the US in August 2007, supported on various dates by Fountains of Wayne, Will Hoge, Big Head Todd and the Monsters, Aimee Mann, and Cheap Trick.

In November 2007, the band released Five Live: On Tour in America, a live CD consisting of recordings from the American tour. Television appearances and live shows in the US and UK followed in 2008, 2009 and 2010.

The band were honoured with a Heritage Award by PRS for Music in March 2010. A plaque was erected at Greenwich Dance's The Borough Hall on Royal Hill in Greenwich, London where they had performed their first gig.

Squeeze embarked on their 'Spot The Difference' tour of the US in July 2010, which continued in the UK in November and December. The CD Spot The Difference, a re-recording of Squeeze's classic hits, was released in August 2010 to accompany the tour.

On the US tour, during a performance of "Pulling Mussels (From the Shell)" live on the Late Night with Jimmy Fallon show, Stephen Large played the keyboard solo on an Apple iPad.

In September 2010, Stephen Large left the band and was replaced by Steve Nieve, who had played as a session musician with Squeeze and Difford in the past, but had not—until this line-up change—ever been an official member of the group. However, within a matter of months, Large returned to the Squeeze line-up as Nieve left the band.

This line-up of Difford/Tilbrook/Bentley/Large/Hanson continued to tour throughout 2011 and 2012. A 20-track live recording, Live at the Fillmore, was issued on iTunes and as a limited-edition white vinyl double LP in April 2012.

Prior to their 2012 UK tour, Squeeze announced on the Radcliffe & Maconie show on BBC Radio 6 Music that they would be selling live recordings of every night's show on the tour at each venue via a 'Pop up Shop'. When the tour commenced, each live recording the band sold also came with a 4-song bonus disc entitled Packet of Four; these were studio recordings of new Squeeze songs, their first studio recordings of new material in 14 years.

On 11 February 2013, Tilbrook and Difford performed a live cover of the Beatles' song "Please Please Me" on BBC Radio 2. They were joined by Paul Jones on harmonica. Alongside other contemporary artists, the performance was part of a 50th anniversary celebration of the original recording of the first Beatles album of the same name in the same period of time. A documentary of the recordings was shown by BBC Four on 15 February 2013.

Beginning in the autumn of 2014, Difford and Tilbrook began touring as a duo, playing Squeeze hits in smaller venues in the UK. Squeeze, still operating as a full band, also continued to play occasional festival shows through 2014 and 2015. In early 2015, Squeeze announced that bassist John Bentley would play his final gig with the band on 24 July. In an interview, Bentley announced his replacement will be Lucy Shaw (also the bassist for Tilbrook's backing band The Fluffers), which was officially confirmed by Squeeze in August.

In 2016–2018 the band continued to tour, in the US, Australia and extensively in the UK.

==== Cradle to the Grave ====
From 2008 forward, Difford and Tilbrook repeatedly stated in interviews that they planned to produce an album of new Squeeze material; they alluded to this in on-camera interviews at V Festival in both 2008 and 2011. In January 2010, it was announced that they would be spending part of the coming summer in Italy together writing songs for a new Squeeze album, and in an interview on BBC Radio Wales on 10 November 2013, Tilbrook stated that Squeeze would be recording between January and March 2014. However these sessions never took place and Tilbrook ended up recording and releasing the solo album Happy Endings.

Around the same time, it was announced that Squeeze would be providing the music for a BBC drama called Cradle to Grave, based on the autobiography Going To Sea in a Sieve by Danny Baker. Squeeze debuted the song "Cradle to the Grave" on their 2013 tour, whilst Difford and Tilbrook were photographed with Danny Baker on the set of Cradle to the Grave.

Recording for the album finally got underway sometime in 2014/2015, and in April 2015, Difford announced on his Twitter feed that he had listened to a "first mix" of the new album. In July, Squeeze announced on their Facebook page that the album was entering the mastering stage. Cradle to the Grave, the band's first album of original material since 1998 received its official release on 2 October 2015. A limited edition of 1000 copies were released through the band's own Love Records at the end of August.

In December 2015, Difford and Tilbrook appeared on BBC Radio 4's "Mastertapes" series, where guests talk about the album that made them or changed them. The album in question was "East Side Story", and was recorded in front of a live audience at the BBC's iconic "Maida Vale Studios".

==== Present activity ====
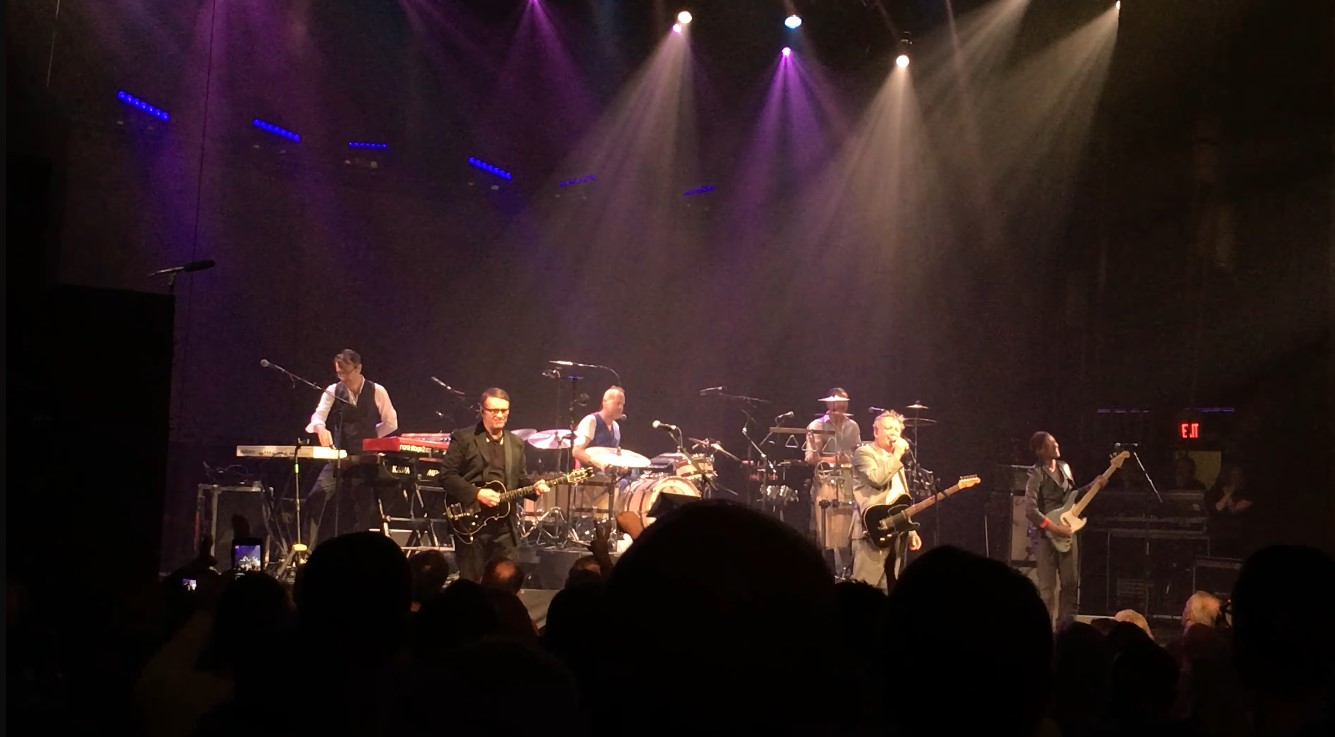
The band in 2017

Squeeze performed in front of David Cameron on BBC's The Andrew Marr Show in January 2016 and used the performance to protest against the then-Prime Minister by changing the lyrics to their song "Cradle to the Grave".

In 2017, Squeeze released The Knowledge. A new single, "Innocence in Paradise", was released ahead of the album.

In September 2019, Squeeze were joined at the Louisville, Kentucky Bourbon & Beyond Festival by ex-Nirvana drummer and Foo Fighters front-man Dave Grohl on drums, for a performance of the 1982 hit "Black Coffee in Bed".

In February 2020, it was announced that Yolanda Charles had departed the band, and new bassist Sean Hurley (who had filled in for Charles on bass on a few 2019 dates, including the date Dave Grohl guested) would be replacing her. In April of that year, Tilbrook, while discussing an upcoming scheduled gig, mentioned that it would be the "very first gig with our new bass player! A chap called Owen Biddle, who used to play in a band called The Roots." However, the show in question was postponed due to the COVID-19 pandemic.

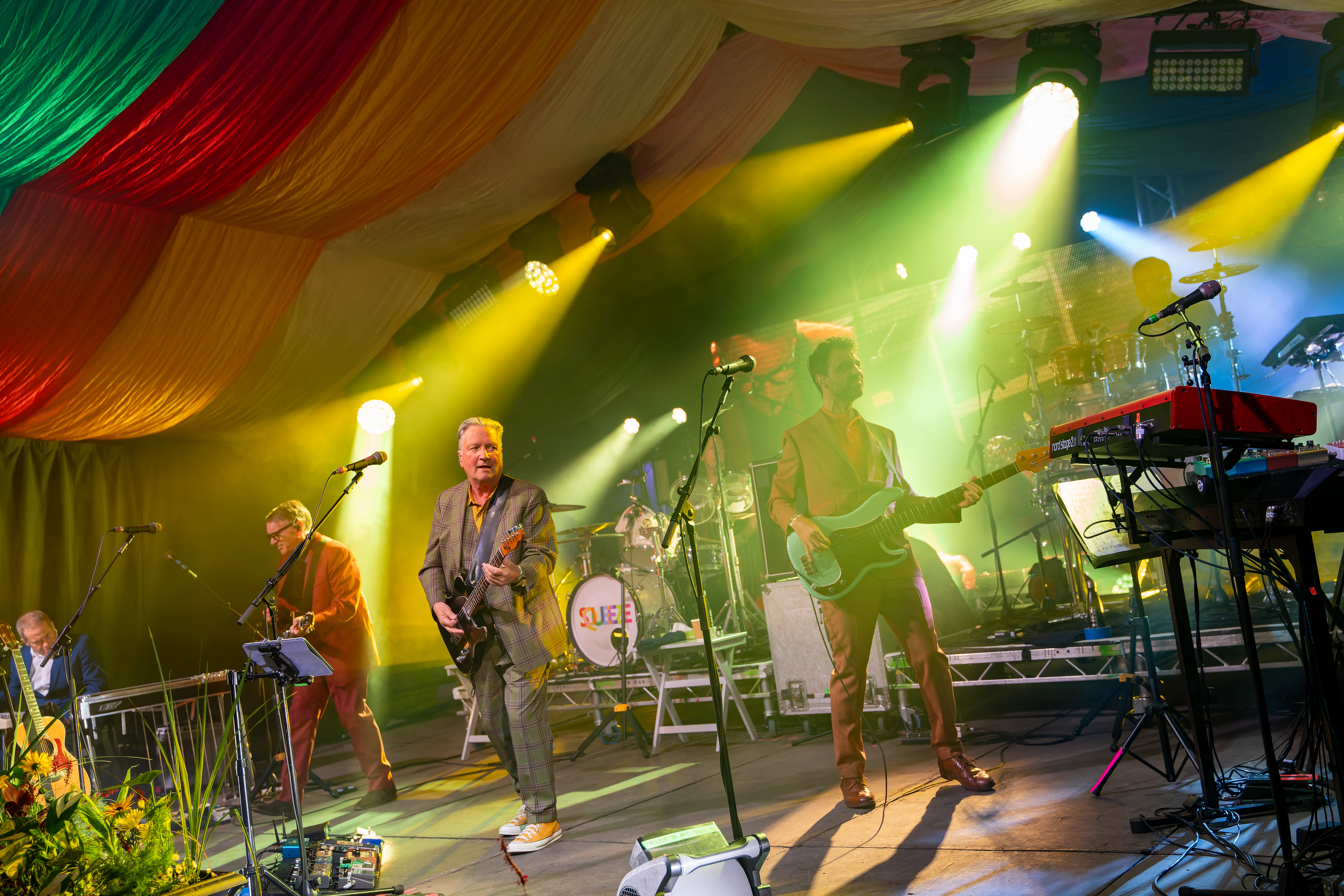
The band in 2023

In November 2022, in response to the United Kingdom cost of living crisis, the band announced that proceeds from their Food for Thought EP would be donated to food banks and asked fans attending their UK tour to bring donations for the Trussell Trust.In September 2023 Tilbrook said that Squeeze intended to record their next two albums in Los Angeles, including one collection of new material and another consisting of previously unrecorded songs written in the band's very earliest days.

On 8 June 2024 the band were special guests for Richard Thompson, on the final night of his UK tour, at the Royal Albert Hall.

The album Trixies, consisting of songs that Difford and Tilbook wrote more than 50 years earlier, but had never recorded, was released in March 2026., It peaked at #15 on the UK album charts.

On 17 May 2026, Squeeze appeared on the first episode of the 68th series of Holland's Later... with Jools Holland programme. At his request, Holland performed "Take Me I'm Yours" with the band.

== Style and influences ==
=== Style ===
Stylistically, Squeeze have been characterised as new wave, post-punk, pub rock and power pop. Stephen Thomas Erlewine of AllMusic proclaimed the band to provide "one of the links between classic British guitar pop and post-punk". Squeeze have also been labelled as punk and pop punk. In a January 1988 interview by Music Connection, when addressing Squeeze being thought of as a punk band, Glenn Tilbrook commented "I never thought that we were [a punk band] – although I thought we were influenced by it to a certain extent".

=== Influences ===
Squeeze were inspired by 1960s rock bands The Kinks and The Beatles, and the songwriting partnership of Difford and Tilbrook has attracted comparisons to that of John Lennon and Paul McCartney, a likening the band have expressed "mixed feelings" about. In addition, members of Squeeze have cited artists including David Bowie, Elvis Costello, Donovan, The Blockheads' Ian Dury, Bob Dylan, Jimi Hendrix, King Crimson and Greg Lake, Nick Lowe, Glenn Miller, Ramones, The Rolling Stones, the Velvet Underground and Lou Reed, and The Who as sources of influence or inspiration.

== Legacy and influence ==
Squeeze have been cited as an influence by several bands and artists. American new wave singer Marshall Crenshaw cited Squeeze as one of the primary influences for his 1982 self-titled debut album. College rock band the Replacements, particularly bassist Tommy Stinson, also professed an admiration for the band. Many artists in the Britpop genre also took influence from the band, particularly Blur, whose guitarist Graham Coxon called Squeeze an "amazing band" and named Tilbrook's voice as "one of my favourite ever English singing voices." Later artists who named Squeeze as an influence include American Hi-Fi, The Caulfields, Kasabian, the Killers, Nightmare of You, Razorlight, and Space.

Many bands and artists who would later achieve phenomenal success would begin their careers opening for Squeeze, including Dire Straits, The Jam, R.E.M., The Specials, U2 and XTC.

== Members ==
Current members

- Glenn Tilbrook – lead guitar, keyboards, vocals (1974–82, 1985–99, 2007–present)
- Chris Difford – rhythm guitar, vocals (1974–82, 1985–99, 2007–present)
- Stephen Large – keyboards, backing vocals (2007–present)
- Simon Hanson – drums, percussion, backing vocals (2007–present)
- Steve Smith – percussion, rhythm guitar, vocals (2017–present)
- Melvin Duffy – pedal and lap steel guitars, dulcimer (2019–present; session/touring 2015–19)
- Owen Biddle – bass, backing vocals (2020–present)
- Danica Dora – backing vocals, keyboards (2024–present)
- Leon Tilbrook – guitar, backing vocals (2026–present)

== Discography ==
- Squeeze (1978)
- Cool for Cats (1979)
- Argybargy (1980)
- East Side Story (1981)
- Sweets from a Stranger (1982)
- Difford & Tilbrook (by Difford & Tilbrook, 1984)
- Cosi Fan Tutti Frutti (1985)
- Babylon and On (1987)
- Frank (1989)
- Play (1991)
- Some Fantastic Place (1993)
- Ridiculous (1995)
- Domino (1998)
- Spot the Difference (2010)
- Cradle to the Grave (2015)
- The Knowledge (2017)
- Trixies (2026)
