= Simon Hanson =

British musician (born 1964)

Peter Simon Hanson (born 3 February 1964) is an English drummer, songwriter and producer. Formerly the drummer of Death in Vegas, he is the drummer of the rock band Squeeze.

== Career ==
In 1985, Hanson formed the band Shot, which was signed by IRS records. However nothing was ever released. He was then spotted by a member of the band The Blessing and joined them on tours. Together they signed with MCA Records and recorded Locusts and Wild Honey. Jimmy Miller was called in to produce three tracks on the album. Miller was hugely influential on Hanson's work as Miller had been himself a drummer. Miller taught him that being creative, is not always being in control. Unfortunately, Miller died before the album's release, in 1994.

In the early 1990s, Hanson worked with Tina Hamilton at Session Connection, playing drums with Ace of Base, Natalie Imbruglia, Hall and Oates and the P.F. Project amongst others. By the mid-1990s, he started touring with Energy Orchard and worked on the Pain Killer album released in 1995. Hanson recorded with artist Bap Kennedy on MCA label. In 1995, he toured with Energy Orchard replacing drummer Dave Toner, as they were the support band of The Animals' tour in Germany.

From 1996 to 1998, he toured with Tony Hadley and recorded with Bruce Woolley and the Radio Science Orchestra. Hanson joined The Aloof in 1997 and discovered the emerging world of dance music. As drummer for the band, he recorded the album, Seeking Pleasure released in 1998, signed by East West Records. At that time the Radio Science Orchestra wrote, co-produced and performed the title track "Storm", performed by Grace Jones for the 1998 film The Avengers.

From 1999, Hanson joined Death in Vegas and recorded the album Contino Sessions, released in 1999, before touring with the band in the UK and in the US. Hanson also played the drums on the album Scorpio Rising. Hanson that had been so far influenced by rock and roll in previous years, discovered dance and house music while touring with Death in Vegas. This experience with dance music was to influence his playing style which evolved to become a combination of rock and roll and dance music. In the late 90s, Hanson performed live on tours with hard rock and rock and roll bands The Quireboys and The Dogs D'Amour. In 1996, he worked with The Dogs D'Amour frontman Tyla and Spike Gray from the Quireboys with whom he recorded the album Flagrantly Yours, under the name Spike and Tyla's Hot Knives. In 1999, Hanson was called in to play the drums on Rick Wakeman's concept album Return to the Centre of the Earth, a sequel to the previous Journey to the Centre of the Earth (1974). From 1999, Hanson recorded with Death in Vegas, where he participated on the Contino Rooms and Scorpio Rising albums, including collaborations with Iggy Pop and Liam Gallagher. He also toured with the band in France, the UK and the US.

In May 2000, Hanson appeared as the drummer in a fictional version of Slade for the movie Married 2 Malcom starring Mark Addy, Josie Lawrence and Hywel Bennett.

Between 2000 and 2006, Hanson lent his talent as a drummer to various bands amongst which included The Men They Couldn't Hang, Baxter Dury, Joy Zipper, The Boy Least Likely To and Secret Affair. He also recorded and toured around the UK and the US with Squeeze frontman and friend, Glenn Tilbrook. He worked on Tilbrook's albums The Incomplete Glenn Tilbrook, Transatlantic Ping Pong and Pandemonium Ensues that was released in 2009.

In 2007, after half a decade of solo work Chris Difford and Tilbrook that they would re-form Squeeze and Hanson was to become a full-time member and the drummer of the band. Together they recorded Squeeze's first album in 12 years, Spot the Difference, consisting entirely of new recordings of older Squeeze songs.

Since 2010, Tilbrook and Hanson have been touring together. In 2010, while on a tour in Colchester, Tilbrook asked Hanson to sing a Kevin and Dave, a song that they had co-written together. Whilst on the road Hanson decided to write his own songs, often writing and recording on the back of the tour bus, using an iPad that which given to him. His first solo album Songs from the Silver Box was released spring 2013. One of the track's titles is "A9 South Road" and was written between Aberdeen and Glasgow. In October 2015, Strata Books published an article written by Hanson recalling the making of his debut slbum.

"A9(south)" received minor radio play on BBC Radio 6 Music.

Since 2001, Hanson has been working with the Teenage Cancer Trust in association with Yamaha. He teaches young people with cancer to play drums and write songs. In 2011 Squeeze played at the Royal Albert Hall for the Teenage Cancer Trust. In this instance Hanson's drums kit and two guitars were painted by Damien Hirst and auctioned by Christies, the money raised by the sales was given to the Teenage Cancer Trust.

In October 2015, Squeeze released their first studio album of new material for 17 years Cradle to the Grave, on which Hanson played drums on every track. The album accompanied the BBC TV series Cradle to Grave, which was an adaptation of Danny Baker's biography, Going to Sea in a Sieve. Cradle to the Grave peaked at number 8 in the UK Album Chart in October 2015.

On 10 January 2016, Hanson performed with Squeeze live on BBC television's The Andrew Marr Show in the presence on then Prime Minister David Cameron when Glenn Tilbrook sang a revised third verse to their song "Cradle to the Grave", changing the lyrics to; "There are some here who are hell bent on the destruction of the welfare state". On 25 June 2016, Squeeze played a set on the Pyramid Stage at the Glastonbury Festival.

In 2018, Hanson worked with Hybrid as a member of 'Hybrid Live'. Hybrid played three gigs in the UK that year in London, Sheffield, and Bristol. In 2019, Hybrid released a short film to accompany their single, "Hold Your Breath". Hanson can be seen in the video as a "staggering man" at a house party.

== Discography ==
Name	Type	Artist	Label
"Pessimists Paradise"	Single	Delusion	Whizzo Records
Seeking Pleasure	Album	The Aloof	East West
Fragrantly Yours	Album	Hot Knives	Cargo
Memories of the Future	Album	Radio Science Orchestra	Gramaphone Records
"Storm"	Single	R.S.O. feat. Grace Jones	Atlantic
"Dirge"	Single	Death in Vegas	BMG
"D.I.F.M."	Single	The Aloof	Screaming Target
Return to the Centre of the Earth	Album	Rick Wakeman	Virgin Classics
Contino Sessions	Album	Death in Vegas	BMG
"Neptune Ciry"	Single	Death in Vegas	BMG
"Aisha"	Single	Death in Vegas feat. Iggy Pop	BMG
"One More Time"	Single	Death in Vegas	BMG
"Reeling for Love"	Single	HMP	Independiente
"So You Say You Lost Your Baby"	Single	Death in Vegas feat. Paul Weller	BMG
"Flying" (live)	Single	Death in Vegas	BMG
Scorpio Rising	Album	Death in Vegas	BMG
"Buried Alive"	Single	Ozzy Osbourne	Virgin Classics
The Incomplete Glenn Tilbrook	Album	Glenn Tilbrook	Quixotic
"Parallel World"	Single	Glenn Tilbrook	Quixotic
"This is Where You Ain't"	Single	Glenn Tilbrook	Quixotic
"Monkey Puzzle Tree"	Single	Lucia	Universal
"Sons of Rother"	Single	Death in Vegas	Drone
Transatlantic Ping Pong	Album	Glenn Tilbrook	Qixotic
Milk It	Album	Death in Vegas	BMG
"Fairytale Ending"	Single	The Boy Least Likely to	+1 Records
"You're So Good"	Single	Joy Zipper	Vertigo
"We're Coming Over"	Single	Mr. Smash	RGR
I Spy	Album	Twisterbait	Xacca Sounds
Pandemonium Ensues	Album	Glenn Tilbrook	Quixotic
"Through the Net"	Single	Glenn Tilbrook and the Fluffers	Quixotic
Five Live: On Tour in America	Album	Squeeze	Quixotic
"Knocking"	Single	Will and the People	RCA
"Weirdos"	Single	Will and the People	RCA
Will and the People	Album	Will and the People	Baggy Trouser
Spot the Difference	Album	Squeeze	Anchor and Hope
Live at the Fillmore	Album	Squeeze	Anchor and Hope
Soho Dreams	Album	Secret Affair	I Spy
Dynamite Jet Saloon MMX	Album	Tyla	Cargo
Songs from the Silver Box	Album	Simon Hanson	Hanson Tunes
The Devils Supper	Album	Tyla	Cargo
Graveyard of Empty Bottles	Album	Tyla	Cargo
Beautiful Curse	Album	The Quireboys	Cargo
Happy Endings	Album	Glenn Tilbrook	Quixotic
Best of Nineties and Naughties	Album	Tyla J Pallas	King Outlaw Records
Thirsty	Album	Thirsty	Cargo
100% Pure Frankie Miller	Album	Spike	Cargo
Cradle to the Grave	Album	Squeeze	Virgin EMI
"Happy Days"	Single	Squeeze	Virgin EMI
