= John Bentley (bassist) =

English bass guitarist (born 1951)

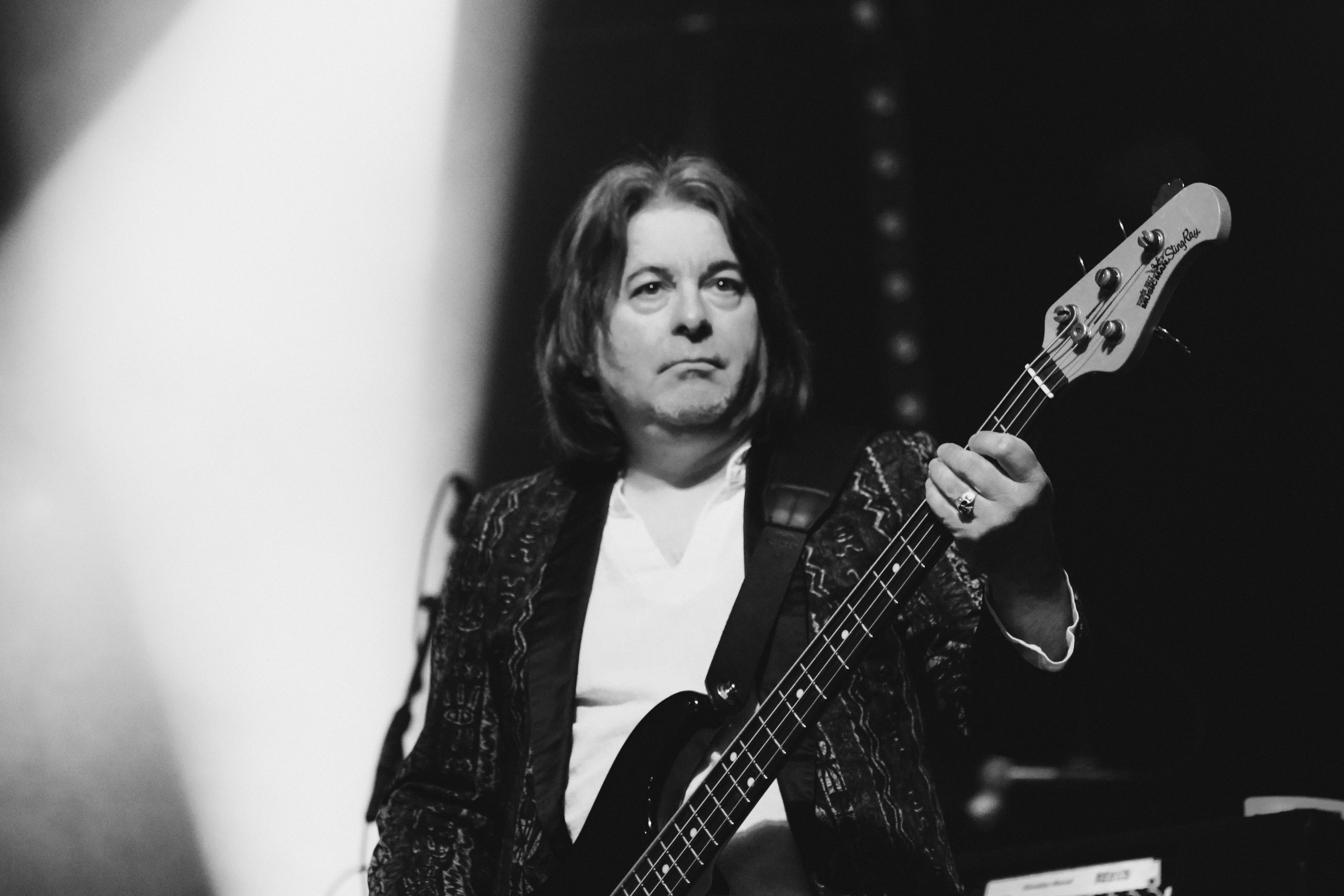
- Bentley performing with Squeeze in 2015

Background information
- Born: Kingston upon Hull, East Riding of Yorkshire, England
- Genres: New wave, power pop, heavy metal
- Occupation: Musician
- Instrument: Bass guitar
- Member of: The Buzniks
- Formerly of: Squeeze

John Bentley (born 16 April 1951) is an English bass guitarist. He is best known for being a member of the band Squeeze from 1980 to 2015.

== Career ==
Bentley played bass for the band Squeeze from 1980 to 1982, replacing their original bassist, Harri Kakoulli. He appeared on the albums Argybargy and East Side Story, as well as Sweets from a Stranger. Bentley appeared with them for a one off gig in 1985, but did not return for a full tour, and was replaced by Keith Wilkinson.

Bentley re-joined Squeeze for the band's 2007 reformation, playing on the band's "Quintessential Tour 2007" through the US and UK. Bentley's first solo album, The Man Who Never Was, an independently released album, was put out in 2007. Squeeze member Glenn Tilbrook reflected on Bentley's role in the band in 2012: "I certainly underrated what John brought to the band the first time around. The Squeeze sound did change when we had Keith Wilkinson, and looking back now, not necessarily for the better. I think John drives us a lot."

His second solo album, ... Based On A True Story, released by Plane Groovy Records in 2014. Bentley's departure from Squeeze was announced on 27 March 2015 and played his last gig at the Wickerman Festival on 24 July 2015; according to the band, Bentley's decision to leave was mutual.

In 2018, Bentley's band The Buzniks released their self-titled first album through 3Ms music. In 2022, he formed heavy metal band Totenwitz with Bill Liesegang and Barry Fitzgerland.

== Personal life ==
Bentley lives in East Preston, West Sussex.
