= Cradle to Grave =

2015 British sitcom

- Genre: Sitcom
- Based on: Going to Sea in a Sieve by Danny Baker
- Written by: Jeff Pope; Danny Baker
- Directed by: Sandy Johnson
- Starring: Peter Kay; Lucy Speed; Laurie Kynaston; Frankie Wilson; Alice Sykes
- Theme music composer: Cradle to the Grave by Squeeze
- Country of origin: United Kingdom
- Original language: English
- No. of series: 1
- No. of episodes: 8

Production
- Executive producer: Danny Baker
- Producer: Kate Crowther
- Running time: 30 mins
- Production company: ITV Studios

Original release
- Network: BBC Two
- Release: 3 September – 15 October 2015

Cradle to Grave is a British sitcom set around the life of Danny Baker. It began airing on 3 September 2015. The sitcom stars Laurie Kynaston as Danny Baker, Peter Kay, and actress Lucy Speed as Danny Baker's parents.

== Plot ==
It is 1973 and 15-year-old Danny is our guide through the ups and downs of life with the Baker family. Dad Fred, nicknamed 'Spud', is a proud South London docker with a penchant for schemes. Wife Bet loves him but longs for the family to go 'straight' and do daft things like pay taxes and put money in the electricity meter instead of always trying to scam it. With eldest daughter Sharon's wedding looming, the docks facing closure, and a switch to the dreaded 'containerisation', which will put thousands of dockers out of work, times are challenging. So, too, are Danny's attempts to get closer to the opposite sex.

With an accompanying soundtrack combining songs from the era with material from Squeeze's Chris Difford and Glenn Tilbrook, Cradle to Grave is based on actual events and characters.

== Cast ==
- Laurie Kynaston as Danny Baker – Spud and Bet's youngest child and son and Michael and Sharon's younger brother. In the fifth episode, Danny leaves school so he can have a relationship with the school's photography teacher Miss Blondel.
- Peter Kay as Fred "Spud" Baker – Bet's husband and Danny, Michael and Sharon's father. He works as a docker but also sells the things he stocks to earn money. He has been described as "a real life Del Boy". In the fifth episode of the series, his middle name is revealed to be Joseph.
- Lucy Speed as Bet Baker – Spud's wife and Danny, Michael and Sharon's mother.
- Frankie Wilson as Michael Baker – Spud and Bet's oldest son and middle child, Danny (with whom he shares a bedroom) and Sharon's brother.
- Alice Sykes as Sharon Baker – Spud and Bet's eldest child and only daughter and Danny and Michael's sister. In the third episode of the series, she becomes engaged to her boyfriend Roger.
- Julie Dray as Miss Blondel – Danny's French photography teacher.
- Alexa Davies as Yvonne – Danny's girlfriend

== Production ==
The series is based on Danny Baker's autobiography Going to Sea in a Sieve, covering Baker's life in south London during the 1970s. A second series was commissioned, but delayed after Peter Kay's cancellation of work plans for family reasons, and seemingly subsequently not written.

== Reception ==
Sean O'Grady of The Independent criticised the accents as "a load of old pony". Jasper Rees of The Daily Telegraph was more positive, describing it as "niftily scripted" and a "savvy, up-to-the-minute comedy" despite its 1970s setting, and "a lot closer to the knuckle – and far funnier – than anything in, say, The Liver Birds or The Likely Lads". Chortle's Steve Bennett was positive about the cast and soundtrack, and described the first episode as "frequently funny, with an episodic structure that delivers wry character-led laughs with the regularity of a sketch show", but noted that it lacked "a consistent tone or strong narrative" whilst Euan Ferguson of The Observer described it as "enjoyable, but little more".

== Episodes ==
| No. | Title | Directed by | Written by | Original release date | UK viewers (millions) |
|---|---|---|---|---|---|
| 1 | "Episode 1" | Sandy Johnson | Danny Baker & Jeff Pope | 3 September 2015 | 3.33 |
Spud's money making schemes end up giving him a nasty shock, whilst a trip to the theatre has an equally surprising outcome for Danny.
| 2 | "Episode 2" | Sandy Johnson | Danny Baker & Jeff Pope | 10 September 2015 | 2.83 |
Bet's yearning to broaden her horizons takes her and Spud to unusual places, whilst Danny tries some exploration of his own after an enlightening sex education lesson.
| 3 | "Episode 3" | Sandy Johnson | Danny Baker & Jeff Pope | 17 September 2015 | 2.46 |
Whilst doors are closing for Spud and the dockers, with old scams like Fat Man and Cat in a Box no longer working, Danny witnesses the dawn of a new era with the advent of home-taping and VCRs.
| 4 | "Episode 4" | Sandy Johnson | Danny Baker & Jeff Pope | 24 September 2015 | 2.38 |
Whilst Spud wonders how to make his daughter's wedding dreams come true, Danny's loyalty to the school football team is tested.
| 5 | "Episode 5" | Sandy Johnson | Danny Baker & Jeff Pope | 1 October 2015 | 2.26 |
Danny finally gets to enter the dark room with Miss Blondel but there is no passion, leading to extreme measures (such as leaving school without telling his parents) to date her. His father takes voluntary redundancy from the docks to become a rag and bone man but for once his efforts to earn a little money on the side do not succeed.
| 6 | "Episode 6" | Sandy Johnson | Danny Baker & Jeff Pope | 8 October 2015 | 2.11 |
Fred persuades Shaky Young, an escaped convict who has been hiding in his sister's loft for fourteen months (despite having only three left to serve) to attend his brother's funeral as Fred sees a financial opportunity for himself in it. Bet befriends a lonely co-worker whose wife has left him whilst Danny's night of passion with Miss Blondel is thwarted when brother Michael brings home a live hand grenade.
| 7 | "Episode 7" | Sandy Johnson | Danny Baker & Jeff Pope | 15 October 2015 | 2.15 |
Rejected by Miss Blondel, Danny hopes to make ex-girlfriend Yvonne jealous by posing as singer David Essex's brother, but still keeps his secret from his parents whilst Fred lands a job as a commissionaire at an office block but quits after a day and, high on LSD brother, Michael nearly puts his eye out and ends up in hospital. With all this to contend with no wonder Bet decides to walk out and go fishing with colleague Keith.
| 8 | "Episode 8" | Sandy Johnson | Danny Baker & Jeff Pope | 15 October 2015 | 1.98 |
Bet is back home but refusing to talk to Fred and gets a call from Keith, suggesting she runs away with him. At Sharon's wedding reception, Bet recalls her courtship and early married life with Fred and her growing awareness of his dodgy deals, which land him in jail. However, after paying for a lavish honeymoon for Sharon, Fred knows just how to win Bet back whilst Danny discovers that he only needs to be himself to impress Yvonne.

== See also ==
- 1970s nostalgia
