= Yolanda Charles =

British bass guitarist and songwriter

Yolanda Charles MBE
- Occupation: Musician
- Instrument: Bass guitar
- Member of: Yolanda Charles' Project pH
- Formerly of: Squeeze; The Deep Mo

Yolande Christina Charles is a British musician. She has played bass guitar with Paul Weller, David A. Stewart, Robbie Williams, Mick Jagger, The Waterboys, Hans Zimmer and from July 2017 through early 2020 she was a member of Squeeze.

Charles has been playing professionally since 1989. In 1993, she was part of the house band on the short-lived TV show Saturday Zoo. She was heard playing bass by Paul Weller and became part of his band promoting his album Wild Wood; she also recorded bass for another of his albums, Stanley Road. She released an EP in 2009 and an album in 2011 with her band The Deep MO, and has a new band called Project pH. She has also been involved in teaching, including running classes at the Royal Northern College of Music, Manchester. She is currently a visiting tutor at Trinity Laban Music college.

Charles runs a record label called Mamayo Records, and works as an independent artist releasing her own music through the label. As part of NLYC Productions she works as a writer/arranger and co-produces with guitarist/producer Nick Linnik from Project pH.

She was appointed Member of the Order of the British Empire (MBE) in the 2020 Birthday Honours for services to music.
