= Glenn Tilbrook =

English musician (born 1957)

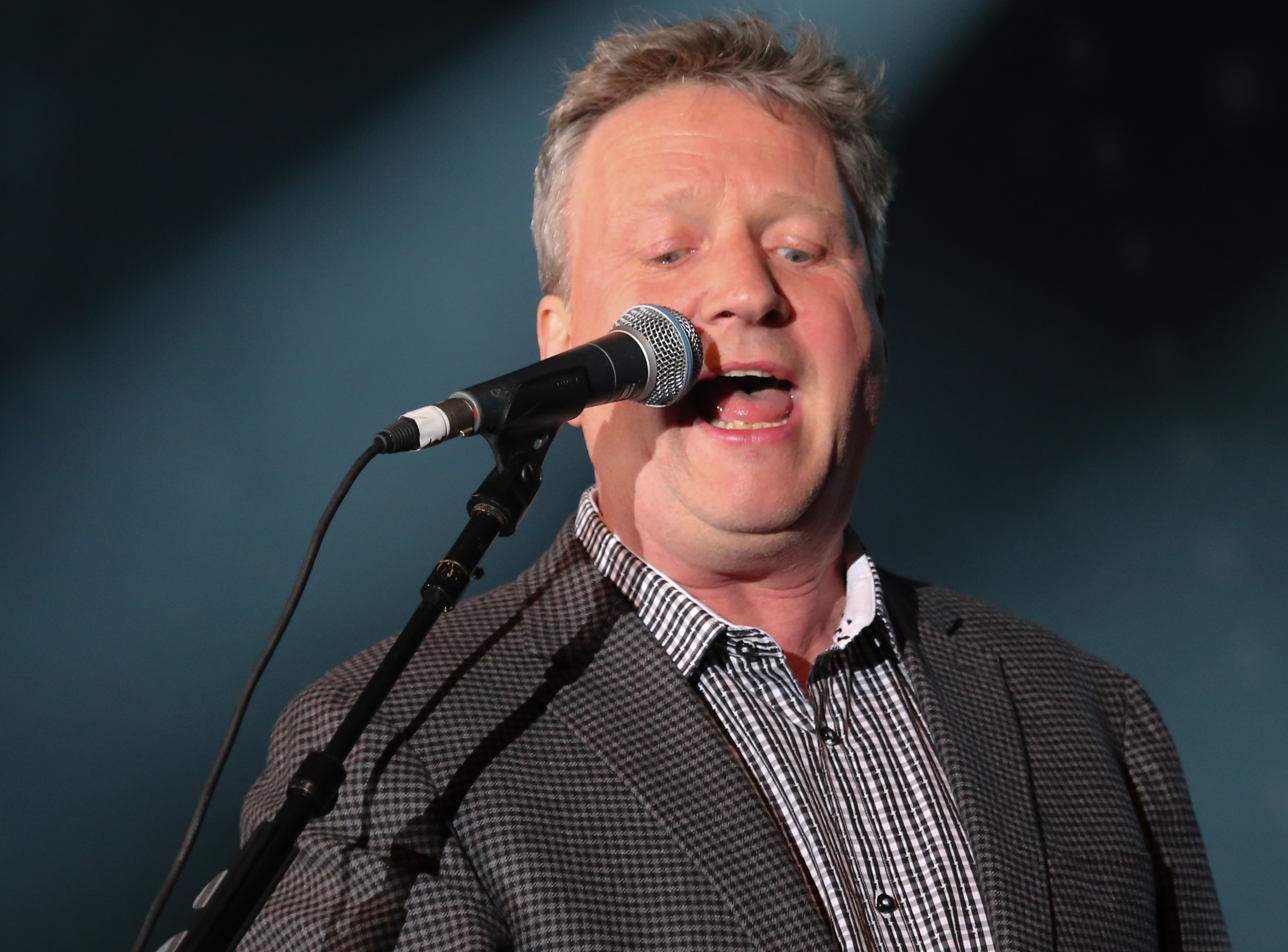
- Tilbrook performing with Squeeze in 2015

Background information
- Born: Glenn Martin Tilbrook; 31 August 1957 (age 69); Woolwich, London, England
- Genres: New wave; power pop
- Occupations: Musician; singer-songwriter
- Instruments: Vocals; guitar; keyboards
- Member of: Squeeze, Difford & Tilbrook, Glenn Tilbrook & The Fluffers
- Website: glenntilbrook.com

Glenn Martin Tilbrook (born 31 August 1957) is an English singer, songwriter and guitarist. He is the lead singer and guitarist of the English new wave band Squeeze, a band formed in the mid-1970s who broke through in the new wave era at the decade's end. He generally writes the music for Squeeze's songs, while his writing partner, Chris Difford, writes the lyrics. In addition to his songwriting skills, Tilbrook is respected both as a singer and an accomplished guitarist.

== Early career ==
Tilbrook was born in Woolwich, London, on 31 August 1957. His father was a welder at a gasworks where the Millennium Dome now stands, who left home when Glenn was five years old. He grew up in a council house, where there was a piano in the house which he learnt to play.

Tillbrook claims that there was no "parental control" and that by age thirteen he was taking drugs. When he was thirteen years old, he was abused by a man who was "almost the same age as his father" while at a concert; he also said that the same introduced him to a "wider world" as he took him to the Glastonbury music festival in 1971.

Glenn attended Eltham Green school, which he was kicked out of after refusing to cut his hair above collar length. By the time Tilbrook was fifteen, he had moved into his girlfriend Maxine's parents house.

== Career ==
=== Squeeze ===
Tilbrook formed Squeeze with fellow guitarist and vocalist Chris Difford in the mid-1970s. Difford had placed an advertisement at a local shop looking for a guitarist and Tilbrook was the only person to respond, at the persuasion of Maxine who also spoke on the phone to Chris as according to him, Glenn was "too shy". Tilbrook also recruited school friend Jools Holland to join the band in its early stages.

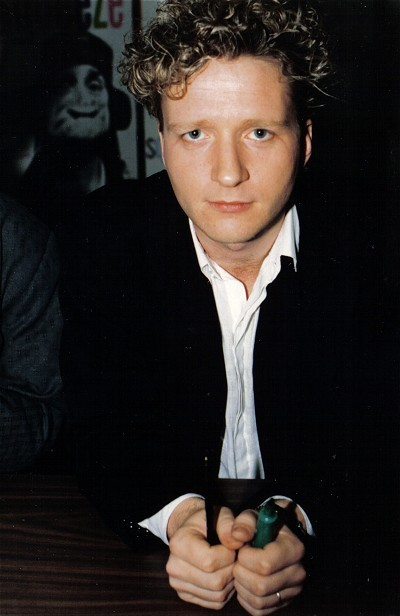
Tilbrook in 1987

In 1982 Squeeze had disbanded. During Squeeze's first hiatus, from approximately 1983 to 1985, Tilbrook wrote, recorded, and toured with Difford as Difford & Tilbrook. Their album, Difford & Tilbrook was released in 1984, and remastered and reissued in 2006. The Difford & Tilbrook album has become the "lost" Squeeze album for many fans.

Squeeze reformed in 1985; however, the partnership began to fray under the duress of Difford's struggles with addiction and questions over the band's commercial and creative direction. The band would again break up in 1999 and remain dormant until a reunion in 2007.

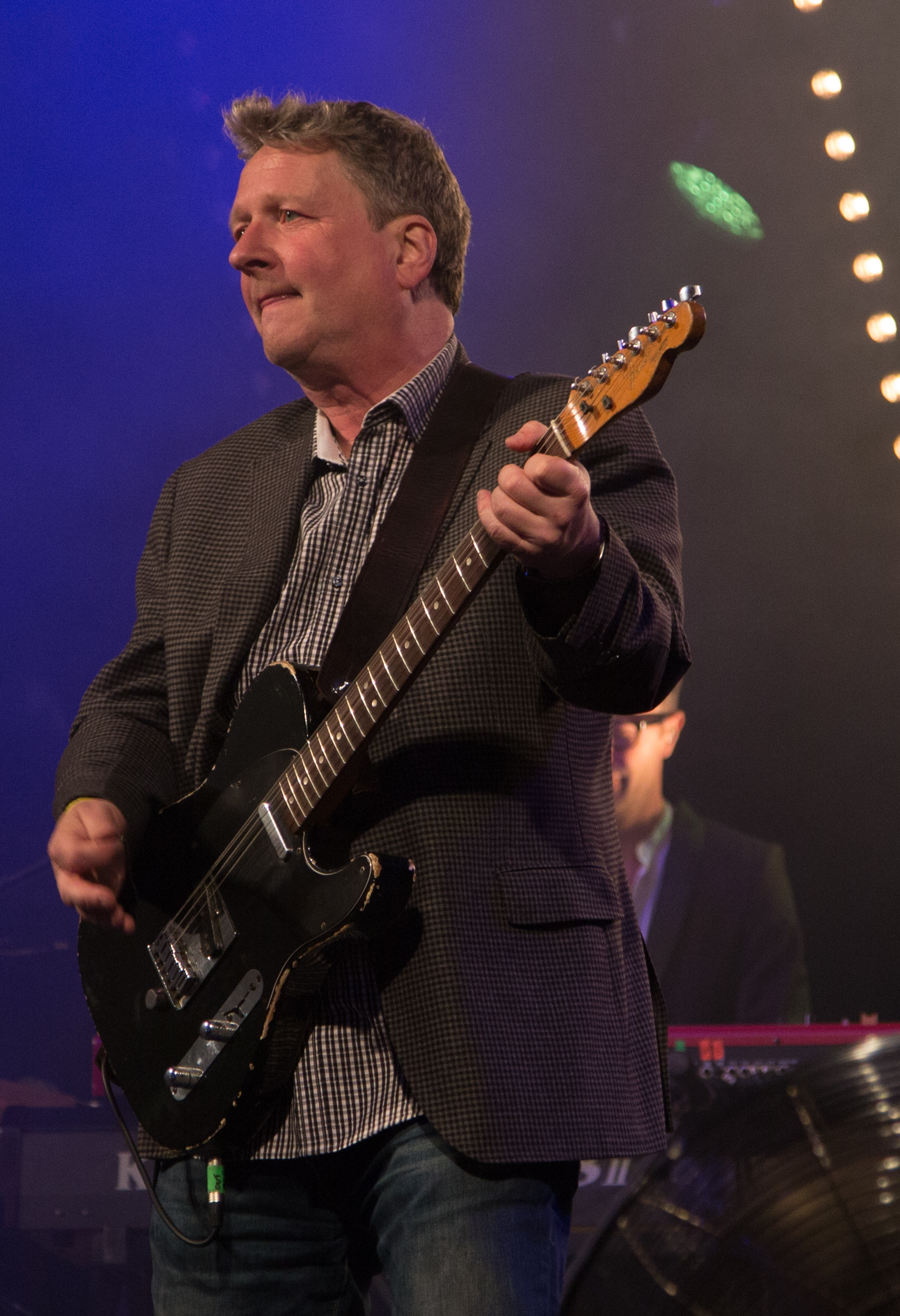
Tilbrook in 2015

In April 2007, Tilbrook released The Past Has Been Bottled, the first in a five-disc series of remastered demos. The first release included early versions of tracks from Squeeze's East Side Story. The second volume, In The Sky Above, was released in the UK in November 2007, and covered the period from 1993 through 1998. The third volume, Dreams Are Made of This, was released in November 2009 and covered Squeeze's early years, from 1974 to 1980. The fourth volume When Daylight Appears, was released in 2011 and covered the years 1985 to 1991. The fifth volume, Upon The Rocks, was released in 2016 and covered the years 1981 to 1984.

In January 2010 it was announced that Tilbrook and Difford would be spending part of the coming summer in Italy, together writing songs for a new Squeeze album. The result of this was a 4-song CD of new demo recordings which emerged during their 2012 tour of the US. The duo toured the UK and US again in 2014–15 with a program they called 'The At Odds Couple'.

As of 2026, Tilbrook still tours Squeeze with Difford, with Stephen Large (keyboards), Simon Hanson (drums), Steve Smith (percussions), Melvin Duffy (additional guitars), Owen Biddle (bass) and Danica Dora (backing vocals).

=== Solo career and outside Squeeze ===
Tilbrook contributed guitar on 1976 demos for punk band The Only Ones. On 18 June 1996, before the Euro '96 England vs. The Netherlands match at Wembley Stadium, Tilbrook appeared on ITV to sing the national anthem, "God Save the Queen".

When he is not touring with Squeeze, Tilbrook fronts his own band, Fluffers, a band he formed in 2003. They tour internationally, and consist of Tilbrook, Stephen Large (keyboards), Simon Hanson (drums) and Lucy Shaw (electric bass), who, apart from Shaw who left in 2017, are also current members of Squeeze.

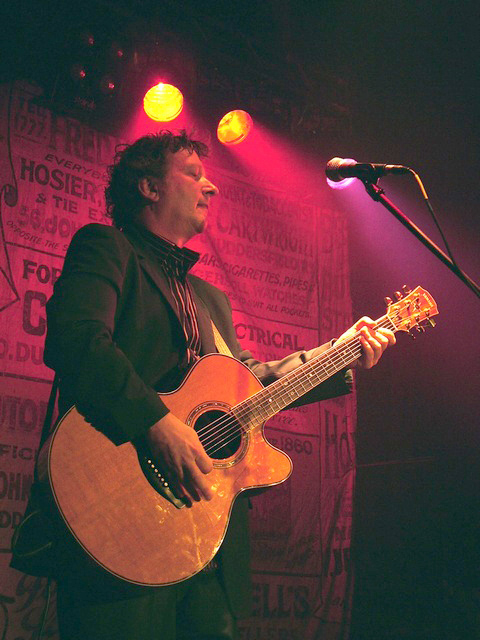
Tilbrook at the Picturedrome, Holmfirth, Yorkshire in 2007

Along with Clem Curtis, Roy Phillips, and Linda Lewis and others, Tilbrook collaborated with Lord Large. He recorded the song, "Man Don't Stick Around Too Long", which appeared on the 2007 album, The Lord's First XI.

In 2014, Tilbrook released a mostly acoustic album titled Happy Ending, Later that year, he was featured on the compilation Songs from a Stolen Spring that paired Western musicians with artists from the Arab Spring. On the album, Tilbrook's performance of the Bob Marley and Peter Tosh song "Get Up, Stand Up" was meshed with Egyptian singer Dina El Wedidi's "Beyond These Doors".

== Personal life ==
Tilbrook has his own recording studio, 45RPM, in Charlton. It has been used by other bands such as Nine Below Zero.

Tilbrook is a supporter of the Love Hope Strength Foundation, a cancer charity founded by Mike Peters of The Alarm, and has played concerts in aid of the organisation, including one at base camp, Mount Everest.

He has been a longstanding supporter of Trussell (formerly The Trussell Trust) using solo and Squeeze tours to raise funds, collect food donations and raise awareness of food insecurity. In 2024, Trussell appointed him an official ambassador

In November 2025 Tilbrook became a patron of the charity Music Venue Trust saying "The grassroots is where it all starts for so many musicians and where local communities can access affordable and exciting live music. We need to protect these venues and nurture the artists so that our great culture can thrive for generations to come.”

He was married to Pam Baker in the early and mid-1980s; the couple struggled with heroin abuse. Pam and Tilbrook divorced. He then married Jane. They had two sons. He is now married to Suzanne Hunt, who is also his manager, with whom he had another two sons. All four of his sons are musicians.

One of Tilbrook's first relationships was with Maxine "Max" Barker, who was largely responsible for urging Tilbrook to answer the Difford's music advert. Barker died of leukemia in 1992, and the following year the band released "Some Fantastic Place", written in dedication to her.

== Style ==
On his guitar style, Tilbrook commented:

I'm very conscious of my guitar playing, particularly early on, and I wouldn’t trust myself to improvise. It's a sort of an insecurity on my part. ... [One person] who really influenced me is the guy who played the solo on the Carpenters' "Goodbye to Love" [Tony Peluso]. That solo really stuck with me. And it's interesting, because ... it starts with the tune and then it branches off into this wonderful thing. You know, it's like in a musical. A song should carry the plot forward. I think the guitar solo should carry the music forward and not just hang around.

== Discography ==
Year	Title	Notes
2001	The Incomplete Glenn Tilbrook	
2001	The Completely Acoustic	
2004	Transatlantic Ping Pong	
2007	The Past Has Been Bottled: East Side Story Demos	
2008	In The Sky Above: The Demo Tapes 1993-1999	
2009	Dreams Are Made Of This: The Demo Tapes 1974-1980	
2009	Pandemonium Ensues	Recorded with The Fluffers
2011	The Co-Operative	Recorded with Nine Below Zero
2011	When Daylight Appears: The Demo Tapes 1985-1991	
2014	Happy Ending	
2016	Upon The Rocks: The Demo Tapes 1981-1984	
