= The Only Ones discography =

This article contains additional information about the English rock band the Only Ones and the lead vocalist Peter Perrett.

== Discography ==
=== Studio albums ===
- The Only Ones (1978), UK #56
- Even Serpents Shine (1979), UK #42
- Baby's Got a Gun (1980), UK #37

=== Compilations & live albums ===
- Special View (1979)
- Remains (1984)
- Alone in the Night (1986)
- Live in London (UK Live) (1989)
- The Peel Sessions Album (1989)
- The Immortal Story (1992)
- The Big Sleep (1993)
- Live at the BBC (1995)
- Hearts On Fire (Live At The Mean Fiddler - 1994) (2000)
- Darkness & Light: The Complete BBC Recordings (2002)
- Why Don't You Kill Yourself? (2004)
- Another Girl, Another Planet: the Best of the Only Ones (2006)
- Original Album Classics (2011)

== Detailed discography ==
Vinyl albums

Year	Album	Label	Notes
1978	The Only Ones	CBS 82830	Promo insert
1984	The Only Ones	CBS 32077	Re-issue same orange label
1979	Even Serpents Shine	BS 83451	Embossed title on cover
1985	Even Serpents Shine	CBS 83451	Re-issue — red label
1980	Baby's Got a Gun	CBS 84089	Lyric insert
1985	Baby’s Got a Gun	CBS 84089	Re-issue — red label
1986	Alone in the Night	DOJO LP 43	
1984	Remains (Fr)	Closer CL 0012	Different tracks to UK
1989	Live	Mau Mau MAU 603	
1989	The Peel Sessions	Strange Fruit SFRLP 102	
1993	The Big Sleep	Jungle FREUD 045	Same as CD
1978	Baby’s Got a Gun (US)	Epic JE 36584	Free EP
1979	Special View (US)	Epic JE 36199	

7-inch singles

Year	Single	Label	Notes
1977	"Lovers of Today"/"Peter and the Pets"	Vengeance VEN001	B&W "kinky" sleeve. The band's first single, recorded at Island Records Basin Street Studios and released independently on the band's own label, "Vengeance Records".
1978	"Another Girl, Another Planet"/"Special View"	CBS 6228	Wallpaper cover
1978	"Another Girl, Another Planet"/"As My Wife Says"	CBS 6576	Promo
1979	"You’ve Got to Pay"/"This Ain’t All (It’s Made Out to Be)"	CBS 7086	Obscure B-side
1979	"Out There in the Night"/"Lovers of Today"	CBS 7285	
1979	"Trouble in the World"/"Your Chosen Life"	CBS 7963	
1980	"Fools" (with Pauline Murray)/"Castle Built on Sand"	CBS 8535	
1983	"Baby’s Got a Gun"/"Silent Night"	Vengeance VEN 002	
1985	"Baby’s Got a Gun"/"Silent Night"		Re-issue
1992	"Another Girl, Another Planet"/"Lovers of Today"	Columbia 657750 7	With the Psychedelic Furs song, "Pretty in Pink" (taken from Sound of the Suburbs). Single reached 57 UK

Vinyl compilations

Year	Album	Label	Notes
1978	The Hope & Anchor Front Row Festival	Warner Bros K 66077	Some blue vinyl?
	Various Artists album		Track: "Creature of Doom"
1979	That Summer (OST)	Arista SPART 1088	Track: "Another Girl, Another Planet" (yellow vinyl)
1979	That Summer (OST)	Arista TEART 1088	Track: "Another Girl, Another Planet" (cassette)
1980	Rock '80	CBS 84172	Track: "Trouble in the World"
	Permanent Wave	Epic	Tracks: "Lovers of Today" and "Another Girl, Another Planet"
