= Special View =

Compilation album by the Only Ones
- Released: 1979 (US)
- Genres: Power pop; new wave; punk rock
- Length: 39:28
- Label: Epic
- Producers: The Only Ones; Robert Ash; Alan Mair; Peter Perrett

The Only Ones chronology
Even Serpents Shine (1979)	Special View (1979)	Baby's Got a Gun (1980)

Special View is the second compilation album by the English power pop band the Only Ones. Released in 1979 in the United States it consists of tracks selected by the American label Epic from the band's first two CBS (UK) albums (The Only Ones and Even Serpents Shine), except for "Lovers of Today" and "Peter and the Pets" which were released on a 1977 single.

== Critical reception ==
Professional ratings
Review scores
Source	Rating
AllMusic	4.5/5 stars
Spin Alternative Record Guide	10/10
The Village Voice	A−

In his "Consumer Guide" column for The Village Voice, Robert Christgau commented that Special View is "an ideal introduction" to Peter Perrett, adding that Perrett "may be major if he sticks at it."

In a retrospective review for AllMusic, critic Ned Raggett wrote, "Though a compilation of albums for America rather than a proper release, Special View could almost be a greatest hits of sorts, capturing the unexpected and underrated talents of Perrett and his bandmates for a late-'70s audience well enough and still holding up in later years."

== Track listing ==
All tracks are written by Peter Perrett.

Side one
No.	Title	Length
1.	"Another Girl, Another Planet"	3:01
2.	"Lovers of Today"	3:13
3.	"Peter and the Pets"	3:04
4.	"The Beast"	5:45
5.	"City of Fun"	3:32
6.	"The Whole of the Law"	2:17

Side two
No.	Title	Length
7.	"Out There in the Night"	3:01
8.	"Someone Who Cares"	3:10
9.	"You've Got to Pay"	2:45
10.	"Flaming Torch"	2:19
11.	"Curtains for You"	4:14
12.	"From Here to Eternity"	3:06
Total length:		39:28

== Personnel ==
The Only Ones

- Peter Perrett – lead and background vocals, guitars
- Alan Mair – bass guitars
- John Perry – guitars
- Mike Kellie – drums

Session musicians

- John "Rabbit" Bundrick – keyboards
- Adam Maitland – keyboards, saxophone
- Koulla Kakoulli – backing vocals

Production

- The Only Ones – production
- Robert Ash – production
- Alan Mair – production
- Peter Perrett – production
- Andy Lyden – assistant engineering
- Kevin Dallimore – assistant engineering
