= Live in London (The Only Ones album) =

Live album by The Only Ones
- Released: September 1989 (US), 26 August 1989 (UK)
- Recorded: 9–10 May 1980
- Venue: Electric Ballroom, Camden, London
- Genre: Rock 'n' roll, punk, power pop
- Label: Skyclad (US), Mau Mau (UK)
- Producer: John Perry

The Only Ones chronology
Remains (1984)	Live in London (1989)	The Big Sleep (1993)

Live in London is a 1989 album released by British rock group The Only Ones on Skyclad Records in the US, and (entitled Live) on Mau Mau Records in the UK. Although the liner notes suggest it is a live recording of a show in June 1977 at The Speakeasy, Margaret St. in London, it was actually recorded 9–10 May 1980 at the Electric Ballroom in Camden. The UK vinyl release has two less tracks.

== Track listing ==
All tracks composed by Peter Perrett

=== Side 1 ===
1. "Trouble in the World"
2. "Programme"
3. "The Beast"
4. "The Happy Pilgrim"
5. "Lovers of Today"
6. "Strange Mouth"
7. "Why Don't You Kill Yourself"

=== Side 2 ===
1. "No Peace for the Wicked"
2. "As My Wife Says"
3. "Miles from Nowhere"
4. "The Big Sleep"
5. "Another Girl, Another Planet"
6. "City of Fun"
7. "Me and My Shadow"

== UK vinyl track listing ==
=== Side 1 ===
1. "Trouble in the World"
2. "Programme"
3. "The Beast"
4. "Lovers of Today"
5. "Why Don't You Kill Yourself"
6. "No Peace for the Wicked"
7. "As My Wife Says"

=== Side 2 ===
1. "Miles from Nowhere"
2. "The Big Sleep"
3. "Another Girl, Another Planet"
4. "City of Fun"
5. "Me and My Shadow"

== Personnel ==
The Only Ones

- Peter Perrett - lead vocals, guitar
- Alan Mair - bass
- John Perry - guitar
- Mike Kellie - drums
