= Remains (The Only Ones album) =

Compilation album by the Only Ones
- Released: June 1984
- Genre: Power pop; new wave; punk rock
- Label: Closer
- Producer: Robert Ash; Peter Perrett

The Only Ones chronology
Baby's Got a Gun (1980)	Remains (1984)	Live in London (1989)

Remains is a rarities album by the English rock band the Only Ones, released in June 1984 by Closer Records. This collection combines pre-Only Ones recordings from November 1975 with Only Ones demos, many from August 1976. Both sessions took place at Tooting Studios in South London. The 1975 titles — "Watch You Drown", "My Rejection", "Don't Hold Your Breath" and "I Only Wanna Be Your Friend" — also feature contributions from Squeeze's Glenn Tilbrook, Gordon Edwards, drummer Alan Platt, and John Perry playing bass guitar. These demos pre-date the recording of the first Only Ones single, "Lovers of Today". Subsequent tracks all feature the regular Only Ones line-up.

"Counterfeit Woman" and "Baby's Got a Gun" are later, full band recordings from Basing Street Studios, and "Silent Night" was recorded at the Dutch radio station Hilversum. "Devon Song" originates from some 8-track demos recorded at Romansleigh in North Devon.

== Track listing ==
All tracks composed by Peter Perrett, except "My Way of Giving" composed by Steve Marriott and Ron Lane.

1. "Prisoners"
2. "Watch You Drown"
3. "Flowers Die"
4. "Devon Song"
5. "My Rejection"
6. "Baby's Got a Gun"
7. "Hope Valley Blues"
8. "Counterfeit Woman"
9. "My Way of Giving"
10. "River of No Return"

Initial copies of the Remains LP included a free 45 rpm promotional extended play (EP) with the following tracks:

1. "I Only Wanna Be Your Friend"
2. "Broken Arrows"
3. "Oh No"
4. "Don't Hold Your Breath"

These tracks were also included on the original CD issue. Subsequent versions of both the LP and CD include all these tracks except "My Way of Giving" and "Broken Arrows", but also have two extra tracks, "Silent Night" and "Don't Feel Too Good".

== Personnel ==
The Only Ones

- Peter Perrett — vocals, guitar, drums on "Baby's Got a Gun"
- John Perry — guitar, synth and bass guitar
- Alan Mair — bass guitar
- Mike Kellie — drums

Session musicians

- Glenn Tilbrook — guitar
- Alan Platt — drums
- Gordon Edwards — keyboards
