= Kakoulli =

Kakoulli is a surname. Notable people with the surname include:

- Harri Kakoulli (born 1952), British musician, brother of Koulla
- Koulla Kakoulli (1961–2018), British musician, dominatrix and bodybuilder
