= Why Don't You Kill Yourself? =

Compilation album by The Only Ones
- Released: 22 March 2004
- Recorded: 1977–1992
- Studio: Basing Street, London
- Genre: Punk, power pop
- Length: 78:00(CD1); 53:48 (CD2)
- Label: Edsel Records
- Producer: The Only Ones, Robert Ash

The Only Ones chronology
The Big Sleep (1993)	Why Don't You Kill Yourself? (2004)	Another Girl Another Planet: the Best of the Only Ones (2006)

Why Don't You Kill Yourself? is a compilation album by English punk band the Only Ones, released in early 2004.

== Track listing ==
=== CD one ===
All songs composed by Peter Perrett.

1. "The Whole of the Law"
2. "Another Girl, Another Planet"
3. "Breaking Down"
4. "City of Fun"
5. "Beast"
6. "Creature of Doom"
7. "It's the Truth"
8. "Language Problem"
9. "No Peace for the Wicked"
10. "Immortal Story"
11. "Lovers of Today"
12. "Peter and the Pets"
13. "Special View"
14. "As My Wife Says"
15. "From Here to Eternity"
16. "Flaming Torch"
17. "You've Got to Pay"
18. "No Solution"
19. "In Betweens"
20. "Out There in the Night"
21. "Curtains for You"
22. "Programme"

=== CD two ===
1. "Someone Who Cares"
2. "Miles from Nowhere"
3. "Instrumental"
4. "This Ain't All"
5. "No Solution"
6. "Happy Pilgrim"
7. "Why Don't You Kill Yourself?"
8. "Me and My Shadow"
9. "Deadly Nightshade"
10. "Strange Mouth"
11. "Big Sleep"
12. "Oh Lucinda (Love Becomes a Habit)"
13. "Reunion"
14. "Trouble in the World"
15. "Castle Built on Sand"
16. "Fools"
17. "My Way Out of Here"
18. "Your Chosen Life"
19. "Baby's Got a Gun"
20. "Oh Lucinda (Love Becomes a Habit)"
