= Goodbye Girl (Squeeze song) =

Single by Squeeze

from the album Cool for Cats
- Released: 3 November 1978
- Recorded: 1978
- Genre: New wave, pop rock
- Length: 3:05
- Label: A&M
- Songwriters: Glenn Tilbrook and Chris Difford
- Producers: John Wood & Squeeze

Squeeze singles chronology
"Bang Bang" (1978)	"Goodbye Girl" (1978)	"Cool for Cats" (1979)

"Goodbye Girl" is the first single released from Squeeze's second album Cool for Cats. Three different versions were recorded: one for the UK single, one for the American single, and one for the album. In the UK, the single reached number 63 on the UK Singles Chart.

== Background ==
"Goodbye Girl" notably features a percussive track arranged by drummer Gilson Lavis which featured unique array of bottles, tins, and other items. Glenn Tilbrook commented, "Gilson's influence in the arrangement was massive, not bringing the drums in until the third verse. Gilson had four percussion parts that he overdubbed one after the other that went throughout the song." Chris Difford offered similar praise, stating, "Gilson constructed a washing line of bottles and bits of metal and tin and played them instead of a drum kit. It was a very inventive thing to do, slightly surreal, but it worked a treat."

The song was written by Glenn Tilbrook (music) and Chris Difford (lyrics). Tilbrook commented, "It had a jolly tune, which later to my horror someone pointed out sounded like the Muppets theme tune." The song additionally features Tilbrook and Difford's trademark harmonies, with the latter commenting, "Our trademark octave apart vocal is all over it."

== Release ==
"Goodbye Girl" was released as the debut single from the band's sophomore 1979 album Cool for Cats. The single reached number 63 on the UK Singles Chart and would be outperformed commercially by subsequent singles on the album. The three different versions of the song are musically different sounding and have different intros. Also, the lyrics are different in each of the three versions. In the album version, the singer meets the girl in a "barroom", but in the U.K. and U.S. singles he meets her in a "poolroom". The location is altered in the second verse from a "motel" in the album version and the U.S. single to a "hotel" in the U.K. single version. More significant changes are in the last verse of each version. The album version describes losing a "blue address book" and "the money in the fur coat". The U.K. single version replaces these items with a "silver razor" and "the money in the waistcoat". The U.S. single replaces these once again with a "silver bracelet" and "the money in the billfold". The locations of where the singer's wife has moved changes in each version as well. For the album version it is "My wife has moved to Guernsey" which was changed to Boston in the U.S. single to be more geographically recognizable to listeners, but oddly enough changed to "Jersey" for the U.K. single. The song has since appeared on compilations such as Singles – 45's and Under.

In 2007, the reunited Squeeze recorded a new, guitar-heavy version of "Goodbye Girl" for an Under Armour television advertisement.

== Reception and legacy ==
Writer Anna Borg ranked the song fourth on her list of best Squeeze songs, writing, "Famous for confounding US audiences with odd slang like 'lino' for linoleum, 'Goodbye Girl' is classic Squeeze in that it tells a story with a rather dire ending for our romantic hero. Always a cad during the pick up, he rarely gets to keep the girl. In this case, he doesn't even get beyond a little kissing." It has been described as a McCartney-esque pop song that tells the tale of a married man's "one-night stand with a shady character" who robs him overnight and then vanishes, "which ends up ruining his life. And yet he can't summon the energy to get angry. He's more bemused by the whole affair."

Tarkio, featuring Colin Meloy of The Decemberists, recorded "Goodbye Girl" in 1998. It was released on the Kill Rock Stars record label in 2006. The Shins covered the song for Levi's Pioneer Sessions in 2010.

== Track listing ==
1. "Goodbye Girl" (3:05)
2. "Saints Alive" (2:29)
