= Up the Junction (song) =

Single by Squeeze

from the album Cool for Cats
- B-side: "It's So Dirty"
- Released: 18 May 1979
- Genre: New wave; power pop
- Length: 3:10
- Label: A&M
- Songwriters: Chris Difford; Glenn Tilbrook
- Producers: Squeeze; John Wood

Squeeze singles chronology
"Cool for Cats" (1979)	"Up the Junction" (1979)	"Slap and Tickle" (1979)

"Up the Junction" is the third single released from Squeeze's second album, Cool for Cats. Sung by Glenn Tilbrook, it is one of the band's most notable songs (especially in the UK), and reached number 2 on the UK Singles Chart, the same position as its predecessor, "Cool for Cats".

== Background and songwriting ==
Up the Junction is also the name of a collection of short stories by Nell Dunn, first published in 1963. Lyricist Chris Difford said the title phrase was lifted from the 1965 TV play version of the work, directed by Ken Loach, and the subsequent 1968 film version. The film had a soundtrack by Manfred Mann, and a song by them, also called "Up the Junction".

Chris Difford wrote the lyrics in New Orleans while Squeeze were on tour. Difford passed it to Glenn Tilbrook, who then wrote the music. The title is not sung until the final line. Difford has been quoted as saying he took the lead from Roxy Music's "Virginia Plain", in which the title also appeared only at the end. Glenn Tilbrook has said the music was partly inspired by the Bob Dylan song "Positively 4th Street", and the lack of a chorus or lyrical repetition—unusual in a mainstream pop hit—was due to Tilbrook feeling a repeated section would upset the flow of Difford's narrative lyrics.

The phrase 'up the junction' is London slang for being in deep trouble, as in the American 'Up the creek without a paddle'. It is also, like other lines in the song, a reference to the (at the time) working-class area of Clapham Junction in Battersea in London.

== Video ==
The video showed the band playing inside a flat—actually the kitchen of John Lennon's old house, Tittenhurst Park, where Lennon had made the promotional film for "Imagine". One of the two girls in the background was future EastEnders actress Michelle Collins. Also, as with the video for "Cool for Cats", John Bentley plays bass guitar in the music video as Harri Kakoulli, who played bass on the recording, had left the band. Difford and Tilbrook explained their calmer performance in the video saying that they recorded the "Up the Junction" music video the same day as "Cool for Cats", and they were drunk and exhausted.

== Later history ==
The song's "girl from Clapham" made an appearance on the later song "A Moving Story", from the band's 1998 album Domino. The song essentially acted as a sequel, detailing the life of mother and daughter after the events of "Up the Junction".

Difford's performance of the song live on Platform 10 at Clapham Junction railway station was featured on the BBC Radio 4 programme Lyrical Journey in September 2011.

== Personnel ==
- Glenn Tilbrook – lead guitar, lead vocals
- Chris Difford – rhythm guitar
- Harri Kakoulli – bass
- Jools Holland – keyboard
- Gilson Lavis – drums

== Track listing ==
1. "Up the Junction" (3:10)
2. "It's So Dirty" (3:10)
