= The Long Sleep =

The Long Sleep may refer to:

== Television ==
- "The Long Sleep", a 2022 episode of Magnum P.I.
- "The Long Sleep" (UFO), a 1971 episode of UFO
- "The Long Sleep", a 1956 episode of Science Fiction Theatre
- "Der lange Schlaf" (English: "The Long Sleep"), a 2022 episode of Der Pass

== Other ==
- The Long Sleep, a 2018 studio album by Jenny Hval
- The Long Sleep, a 1977 play by Pëllumb Kulla
- The Long Sleep, a 1975 novel by Dean Koontz
- The Long Sleep, an 1868 painting by Briton Rivière

== See also ==
- The Big Sleep (disambiguation)
