= Cool for Cats (song) =

Single by Squeeze

from the album Cool for Cats
- B-side: "Model"
- Released: 9 March 1979
- Recorded: 1978
- Genre: New wave; disco; post-punk; pub rock
- Length: 3:39 (album version); 3:10 (single version)
- Label: A&M
- Songwriters: Chris Difford; Glenn Tilbrook
- Producers: John Wood; Squeeze

Squeeze singles chronology
"Goodbye Girl" (1978)	"Cool for Cats" (1979)	"Up the Junction" (1979)
"Crying in My Sleep" (1991)	"Cool for Cats" (1992)	"Third Rail" (1993)

Music video
- "Cool for Cats" on YouTube

"Cool for Cats" is a song by English rock band Squeeze, released in 1979 as the second single from their album of the same name. The song features a rare lead vocal performance from cockney-accented Squeeze lyricist Chris Difford, one of the only two occasions he sang lead on a Squeeze single A-side (the other was 1989's "Love Circles"). The song, slightly edited from the album track, peaked at No. 2 on the UK Singles Chart in 1979, making "Cool for Cats" one of the band's biggest hits.

== Background ==
"Cool for Cats" was written about the social scene the band experienced in their youth. Band member Glenn Tilbrook recalled: "Originally it was written about the social circle we were moving in at the time, being young and being... we were almost entirely centered in our own little world. I remember hearing Chris sing those lyrics for the first time and thinking he's just nailed what our lives are about now. It's lovely to be able to look back on that and see how we were as youngsters."

The title phrase, which Difford felt "was a great song title", is a reference to the television series Cool for Cats. Difford commented in a 1979 interview: "I don't know if you're familiar with the phrase 'Cool For Cats,' but it was the first rock 'n' roll television show in England during 1959. That's where the album and single title originated—I just worked it into some personal experiences within the lyrical content."

Originally, the song was performed much slower and featured a different set of lyrics. However, at the request of co-producer John Wood, Difford wrote a new lyric to the backing track the band had recorded. According to Difford, he wrote a new lyric after watching The Benny Hill Show, which featured character-based musical numbers performed to a flat metre. Tilbrook felt Difford's new lyrics and vocals "sounded unbelievably cool" and recruited his girlfriend and her friends to contribute the female backing vocals on the chorus.

== Release ==
"Cool For Cats" was released as a single on 9 March 1979. The band performed the song on Top of the Pops to promote the single, though the band was forced to alter the lyric "I'm invited in for a coffee / and I give the dog a bone". The band also released a music video for the song featuring the band and female backing singers performing the song. Tilbrook later said the video "makes me cringe", particularly for a moment where Tilbrook "burst through a group of girls" in an attempt to look "panther-like and super-sexy", only to "just look pissed". Difford said that the band originally filmed a different video where the band constantly changed hats, but it did not appear on TV because it featured a clip of drummer Gilson Lavis downing a pint of beer in two seconds. This "alternate" video was, however, screened uncut on the children's TV show Tiswas in April 1979.

"Cool for Cats" would prove to be the band's biggest UK hit to that point, reaching number two on the charts. It remains in tied position with the band's subsequent single, "Up the Junction", for the band's highest UK charting single. The band became ambivalent about these songs, however: Difford noted that the band "deliberately binned" their two best-charting singles when he and Tilbrook started attracting critical acclaim as "the new Lennon–McCartney". Difford concluded, though, "Now I look back on those songs with great affection because without them I wouldn't be where I am today."

The song has also appeared on several of the band's compilations, such as Singles – 45's and Under.

== Reception ==
Cash Box called it "a light, bouncy number that almost borders on a disco beat combines with amusing tongue-in-cheek lyrics and cute female backup vocals." Record World said that "hard, fast-spoken lead vocals contrast with a vivid falsetto chorus."

== Track listing ==
1. "Cool for Cats" (3:10)
2. "Model" (3:30)

1992 UK re-issue
A&M AMCD 694 – Limited Edition Cool Cat Pac

1. "Cool for Cats"
2. "Trust Me to Open My Mouth"
3. "Squabs on Forty Five"

== Personnel ==
- Chris Difford – rhythm guitar, lead vocals
- Glenn Tilbrook – lead guitar
- Harri Kakoulli – bass
- Jools Holland – keyboard
- Gilson Lavis – drums

== Chart positions ==
=== Weekly charts ===
Chart (1979)	Peak position
Australia (Kent Music Report)	5
Netherlands (Dutch Top 40)	39
Netherlands (Single Top 100)	33
New Zealand (Recorded Music NZ)	11
UK Singles (Official Charts)	2

=== Year-end charts ===
Year-end chart performance for "Cool for Cats"
Chart (1979)	Position
Australia (Kent Music Report)	30
