= Even Serpents Shine =

Studio album by the Only Ones
- Released: 9 March 1979 (UK)
- Genre: Punk rock, rock
- Length: 35:11
- Label: Columbia
- Producer: Peter Perrett; Alan Mair

The Only Ones chronology
The Only Ones (1978)	Even Serpents Shine (1979)	Special View (1979)

Even Serpents Shine is the second studio album by the English rock band the Only Ones, released in 1979 by Columbia Records. It was produced by Peter Perrett and Alan Mair.

The album was re-released in the United Kingdom in 2009 on Sony Music Entertainment, featuring bonus content. The reissue was a CD which comprises 14-tracks. It includes the original album digitally remastered from the original 1/2" mix tapes; alongside three bonus tracks.

== Critical reception ==
Professional ratings
Review scores
Source	Rating
AllMusic	4/5 stars
The Irish Times	4/5 stars
Record Collector	4/5 stars
Spin Alternative Record Guide	9/10

The album has consistently been praised by critics. In a retrospective review for AllMusic, critic Mark Deming wrote that "Even Serpents Shine doesn't boast an out-of-the-box classic tune along the lines of 'Another Girl, Another Planet' from the self-titled debut, but in many respects, this is the more consistent album, achieving a similar degree of thematic and melodic variety while generating a more coherent sound and feeling," adding that "they were one of the very few bands of their time and place who inarguably beat the sophomore slump."

Reviewing the album for BBC Music, Chris Jones wrote, "Musically the band were always a step ahead of the pack. Mike Kellie and Alan Mair – both seasoned pros on drums and bass – never falter, allowing John Perry's guitar to fly; while John 'Rabbit' Bundrick's organ adds just the right dollop of Al Kooper-isms."

== Track listing ==
All tracks are written by Peter Perrett.

Side one
No.	Title	Length
1.	"From Here to Eternity"	3:07
2.	"Flaming Torch"	2:21
3.	"You've Got to Pay"	2:49
4.	"No Solution"	2:27
5.	"In Betweens"	3:57
6.	"Out There in the Night"	3:02

Side two
No.	Title	Length
7.	"Curtains for You"	4:18
8.	"Programme"	2:11
9.	"Someone Who Cares"	3:11
10.	"Miles from Nowhere"	3:45
11.	"Instrumental"	4:03
Total length:		35:11

2009 remastered version bonus tracks
No.	Title	Length
12.	"Special View"	2:51
13.	"Oh No"	2:20
14.	"This Ain't All (It's Made to Be)"	3:45

== Personnel ==
The Only Ones

- Peter Perrett – lead and background vocals, guitars
- John Perry – guitars, keyboards
- Alan Mair – bass guitars
- Mike Kellie – drums

Session musicians

- Adam Maitland – keyboards, saxophone
- John "Rabbit" Bundrick – keyboards
- Koulla Kakoulli – backing vocals

Production

- Peter Perrett – production
- Alan Mair – production
- Andy Lyden – engineering
- Kevin Dallimore – engineering
- Michael Beal – cover, art direction, design

== Charts ==
Chart (1979)	Peak position
UK Albums (OCC)	42
