= The Big Sleep (album) =

Live album by The Only Ones
- Released: 25 November 1993
- Recorded: 3 November 1979
- Venue: Paradiso, Amsterdam, the Netherlands
- Genre: New wave, power pop
- Label: Jungle
- Producer: John Perry

The Only Ones chronology
Live in London (1989)	The Big Sleep (1993)	Why Don't You Kill Yourself? (2004)

The Big Sleep is a live album by the English new wave band The Only Ones, produced by John Perry. It was recorded at the Paradiso, Amsterdam. It includes five songs not heard as live versions before. The album was issued on both vinyl LP and CD formats. It was re-released on vinyl in 2010 by Vinyl Lovers.

== Track listing ==
1. "As My Wife Says" (3:27)
2. "In Betweens" (4:42)
3. "Programme" (2:16)
4. "(Oh Lucinda) Love Becomes a Habit" (3:31)
5. "The Big Sleep" (5:27)
6. "Language Problem" (3:02)
7. "Miles from Nowhere" (4:09)
8. "Beast" (6:09)
9. "Another Girl, Another Planet" (3:11)
10. "Peter and the Pets" (3:16)
11. "City of Fun" (3:42)
12. "Trouble in the World" (3:20)
13. "Me and My Shadow" (4:39)
14. "The Immortal Story" (3:04)

== Personnel ==
The Only Ones

- Peter Perrett - guitar, vocals
- John Perry - guitar
- Alan Mair - bass guitar
- Mike Kellie - drums
