= Cool for Cats (album) =

Studio album by Squeeze
- Released: 6 April 1979
- Recorded: 1978–1979
- Studios: Olympic Studios, Britannia Row Studios and Sound Techniques (London, UK)
- Genres: New wave; pop rock; pub rock; power pop
- Length: 38:12
- Label: A&M
- Producers: John Wood and Squeeze

Squeeze chronology
Squeeze (1978)	Cool for Cats (1979)	Argybargy (1980)

Singles from Cool for Cats
- 1. "Goodbye Girl" Released: 3 November 1978; 2. "Cool for Cats" Released: 9 March 1979; 3. "Up the Junction" Released: 18 May 1979; 4. "Slap and Tickle" Released: 31 August 1979

Cool for Cats is the second studio album by the English new wave group Squeeze, released in 1979. Cool for Cats contains four UK hit singles, more than any other album the band has issued. The album peaked at number 45 in the UK Albums Chart, spending 11 weeks in that listing.

Its 1997 CD release, as part of the Six of One... box set contained two bonus tracks. This collection included the band's first six studio albums, each digitally remastered. In 1998 the six CDs were released individually. In 2007, the album was digitally remastered and released with 5 bonus tracks exclusively in Japan. Each of the 5 tracks came from B-sides from the singles released from the album.

== Content ==
Billboard said Cool for Cats was a "hard-rocking" album with "hard-edged power pop". Alluding to the record, Steven Thomas Erlewine of AllMusic described Cool for Cats as "the work of a rock & roll band [...] that lathered on the keyboards and herky-jerky rhythms".

== Critical reception ==
Professional ratings
Review scores
Source	Rating
AllMusic	4.5/5 stars
Encyclopedia of Popular Music	4/5 stars
Music Week	4/4 stars
The Rolling Stone Album Guide	3.5/5 stars
Smash Hits	9/10
Uncut	9/10
The Village Voice	B

In 1979, Billboard selected Cool for Cats as one of its "recommended LPs" and cited "Slap and Tickle", "Hop, Skip & Jump", "Up the Junction", and "It's So Dirty" as the album's "best cuts".

Reviewing the album in Christgau's Record Guide: Rock Albums of the Seventies (1981), Robert Christgau wrote: "Power poppers (remember them?) suck this stuff up, and I understand why—not only does its songcraft surpass that of the band's debut, but it also isn't quite as sophomoric. It's sophomoric enough, though, and like so many such records makes you wonder where the power is. Not in the vision, that's for sure. And not in the beat. Great song: 'Up the Junction.'"

In 1995, Chris Woodstra proclaimed Cool for Cats to be a "pure pop masterpiece" in the All Music Guide to Rock.

== Track listing ==
All songs written by Chris Difford and Glenn Tilbrook except "Hop, Skip & Jump", by Difford and Jools Holland.

1. "Slap & Tickle" – 4:00
2. "Revue" – 2:30
3. "Touching Me Touching You" – 2:25
4. "It's Not Cricket" – 2:35
5. "It's So Dirty" – 3:11
6. "The Knack" – 4:34
7. "Hop, Skip & Jump" – 2:46
8. "Up the Junction" – 3:12
9. "Hard to Find" – 3:37
10. "Slightly Drunk" – 2:41
11. "Goodbye Girl" – 3:08
12. "Cool for Cats" – 3:39

=== Bonus tracks (1997 reissue) ===
13. "I Must Go" – 2:16
14. "Ain't It Sad" – 3:29

=== Bonus tracks (2007 Japanese remaster) ===
(Note: These bonus tracks precede the 1997 bonus tracks on the album.)

1. "Saints Alive" – 2:30
2. "All's Well" – 2:27
3. "Christmas Day" – 3:53
4. "Going Crazy" – 3:53
5. "Blood and Guts" – 5:01

== Personnel ==
Squeeze

- Glenn Tilbrook – keyboards, lead guitars, vocals
- Jools Holland – keyboards, vocals (7)
- Chris Difford – rhythm guitars, vocals
- Harri Kakoulli – bass
- Gilson Lavis – drums

Production and technical

- Squeeze – producers, arrangements
- John Wood – producer, arrangements
- Brian Humphries – engineer
- Andrew Lumm – engineer
- Laurence Burrage – assistant engineer
- Michael Ross – art direction
- Geoff Halpin – original sleeve design
- Jeffrey Kent Ayeroff – artwork
- Janette Beckman – photography
- Mark Hanauer – photography
- Chuck Beeson – cover design
- Cindy Marsh – illustrations
- Glenn Tilbrook – digital remastering
- Roger Wake – digital remastering

== Charts ==
Chart performance for Cool for Cats
Chart (1979)	Peak position
Australian Albums (Kent Music Report)	18
UK Albums (Official Charts Company)	45

== Certifications ==
Certifications for Cool for Cats
Region	Certification	Certified units/sales
Australia (ARIA)	Gold	20,000^{^}
United Kingdom (BPI)	Silver	60,000^{^}
^{^} Shipments figures based on certification alone.
