= How the West Was Won =

How the West Was Won may refer to:

- How the West Was Won (film), a 1962 American Western film
  - How the West Was Won (TV series), a 1970s television series loosely based on the film
- How the West Was Won (Bing Crosby album) (1959)
- How the West Was Won (Led Zeppelin album) (2003)
- How the West Was Won (Peter Perrett album) (2017)
- How the West Was Won, a 2002 album by Luni Coleone
- "How the West Was Won", a 1987 song by Laibach from Opus Dei
- "How the West Was Won", a 1996 song by the Romo band Plastic Fantastic
- "How the West Was Won" (On Call), an episode of the American TV series On Call

== See also ==
- How the West Was Fun, a 1994 TV movie starring Mary-Kate and Ashley Olsen
- How the West Was One (disambiguation)
- "How the West Was Won and Where It Got Us", a 1997 song by R.E.M.
