= The Big Sleep (disambiguation) =

The Big Sleep is a 1939 novel by Raymond Chandler, its title being a euphemism for death.

The Big Sleep or Big Sleep may also refer to:

== Film ==
- The Big Sleep (1946 film), an adaptation of the novel starring Humphrey Bogart and Lauren Bacall
- The Big Sleep (1978 film), another adaptation of the novel, starring Robert Mitchum and Joan Collins

== Television ==
=== Episodes ===
- "The Big Sleep", 3Below: Tales of Arcadia season 2, episode 10 (2019)
- "The Big Sleep", 9 to 5 season 5, episode 18 (1988)
- "The Big Sleep", A.T.O.M. season 1, episode 22 (2006)
- "The Big Sleep", Bear in the Big Blue House season 2, episode 3 (1998)
- "The Big Sleep", Big Deal series 3, episode 1 (1986)
- "The Big Sleep", Bill and Ben series 1, episode 13 (2001)
- "The Big Sleep", Engie Benjy series 3, episode 1 (2004)
- "The Big Sleep", Fantastic Max season 1, episode 4 (1988)
- "The Big Sleep", For Your Love season 2, episode 4 (1998)
- "The Big Sleep", Geronimo Stilton season 3, episode 5 (2016)
- "The Big Sleep", Horizon (British) series 15, episode 6 (1978)
- "The Big Sleep", Mia and Me season 3, episode 25 (2017)
- "The Big Sleep", Mother and Son season 5, episode 3 (1992)
- "The Big Sleep", One Foot in the Grave series 1, episode 2 (1990)
- "The Big Sleep", Ozark season 2, episode 8 (2018)
- "The Big Sleep", Sabrina the Teenage Witch (1996) season 3, episode 19 (1999)
- "The Big Sleep", Sorry! series 3, episode 6 (1982)
- "The Big Sleep", SunTrap episode 3 (2015)
- "The Big Sleep", The Grimleys series 3, episode 1 (2001)
- "The Big Sleep", The Hogan Family season 4, episode 8 (1988)
- "The Big Sleep", The New Worst Witch series 2, episode 5 (2006)
- "The Big Sleep", The Powerpuff Girls (2016) season 1, episode 28 (2016)
- "The Big Sleep", Total Drama Island episode 3 (2007)
- "The Big Sleep", Watch My Chops season 2, episode 5 (2006)
- "The Big Sleep", What-a-Mess (1995) episode 46 (1996)
- "The Big Sleep", Wings (1990) season 7, episode 9 (1995)

=== Shows ===
- The Big Sleep, a British documentary about hypnotism, produced by Open Media for the TV series Equinox

== Music ==
- The Big Sleep (band), an American indie rock/shoegaze band
- The Big Sleep (album), by The Only Ones
- "The Big Sleep", a song by The Amity Affliction from Not Without My Ghosts
- "The Big Sleep", a song by Bat for Lashes and Scott Walker from Two Suns
- "The Big Sleep", a song by The Gathering from How to Measure a Planet?
- "The Big Sleep", a song by The Only Ones from Baby's Got a Gun
- "The Big Sleep", a song by Streetlight Manifesto from Everything Goes Numb
- "Big Sleep", a song by The Acacia Strain from Gravebloom
- "Big Sleep", a song by Simple Minds from New Gold Dream (81–82–83–84)
- "Big Sleep", a song by Waltari from Release Date
- "Big Sleep", a song by The Weeknd from Hurry Up Tomorrow

== Other uses ==
- "The Big Sleep", the fourth episode of the web series Crunch Time

== See also ==
- The Long Sleep (disambiguation)
