= Baby's Got a Gun =

Studio album by the Only Ones
- Released: 1980
- Studios: Red Bus (London); Basing Street (London)
- Genres: Power pop; new wave; punk rock
- Length: 39:02
- Label: Epic
- Producers: Colin Thurston; the Only Ones

The Only Ones chronology
Special View (1979)	Baby's Got a Gun (1980)	Remains (1984)

Baby's Got a Gun is the third and final studio album by the English rock band the Only Ones, released in 1980 by CBS Records in Europe and on Epic Records in America and Japan.

Following the continued lack of commercial success with their previous studio album Even Serpents Shine (1979), and having self-produced both of their studio albums up until that point, it was decided that it was time for a slight change of pace in the Only Ones' career. In an attempt to give their music a more contemporary sound, they joined forces with record producer Colin Thurston, best known for his future work with Duran Duran, Talk Talk, the Human League, Kajagoogoo, and Bow Wow Wow.

Guesting on the album would be Penetration's lead vocalist Pauline Murray, who sang a duet with Peter Perrett on the Johnny Duncan cover song "Fools", and also provided backing vocals for "Me and My Shadow". The album marked the only time that the band had released a cover version with the aforementioned "Fools", which was later released as a single, and Baby's Got a Gun also marked the only time that a guitarist other than the band members Perrett and John Perry had been credited, with Barrie Evans providing rhythm guitar, in addition to playing percussion. Koulla Kakoulli who had sung backing vocals on the band's first two studio albums also returns, making her the only unofficial member of the band to have contributed to all of their albums.

The album peaked at No. 37 on the UK Albums Chart, becoming their best selling studio album.

In the summer of 1980, the Only Ones were the opening act for the fellow rock band the Who on their tour of the United States, and in 1982 the band officially disbanded.

Baby's Got a Gun was re-released on CD in Europe in 2009 on Sony Music. The original album is digitally remastered from the original half-inch mix tapes with three additional tracks, including the title-track which hadn't been released on the original album.

== Critical reception ==
Professional ratings
Review scores
Source	Rating
AllMusic	3.5/5 stars
Robert Christgau	B+
Smash Hits	5/10

In his "Consumer Guide" for The Village Voice, Robert Christgau gave the album a B+ and commented, "Prepunk and for that matter prepub, Peter Perrett may well have been an only one and he fits in now only because this is such a tolerant and/or commercially desperate time. He's not 'power pop', of course – on record, at least, power's got nothing to do with it."

In a retrospective review for AllMusic, critic Mark Deming wrote that "Baby's Got a Gun is clearly the weakest of the Only Ones' three original albums, but for all its faults there's plenty here that testifies to the band's strengths; 'Why Don't You Kill Yourself', 'Strange Mouth', and 'The Big Sleep' are splendid songs that show the band still had the goods and 'Trouble in the World' and 'The Happy Pilgrim' confirm they could reach for a poppier sound without losing their personality in the process."

== Track listing ==
All tracks are written by Peter Perrett, except where noted.

Side one
No.	Title	Length
1.	"The Happy Pilgrim"	2:34
2.	"Why Don't You Kill Yourself"	2:44
3.	"Me and My Shadow"	5:42
4.	"Deadly Nightshade"	3:10
5.	"Strange Mouth"	2:32
6.	"The Big Sleep"	4:58

Side two
No.	Title	Writer(s)	Length
7.	"Oh Lucinda (Love Becomes a Habit)"		3:10
8.	"Re-union"		2:59
9.	"Trouble in the World"		3:05
10.	"Castle Built on Sand"		1:50
11.	"Fools"	Johnny Duncan	2:25
12.	"My Way Out of Here"	Alan Mair	3:53
Total length:			39:02

2009 re-mastered version bonus tracks
No.	Title	Length
13.	"Baby's Got a Gun"	1:56
14.	"The Big Sleep" (Advision studio session, 1979)	4:38
15.	"Your Chosen Life"	2:48

== Personnel ==
Credits are adapted from Baby's Got a Gun liner notes.

The Only Ones

- Peter Perrett – lead and background vocals; guitars
- John Perry – guitars; grand piano; organ
- Alan Mair – bass guitars; lead vocals on "My Way Out of Here"
- Mike Kellie – drums

Session musicians

- Pauline Murray – co-lead vocals on "Fools"; backing vocals on "Me and My Shadow"
- Barrie Evans – rhythm guitar; percussion
- Koulla Kakoulli – backing vocals

Production

- Colin Thurston – producer; engineer
- The Only Ones – producer
- Robert Ash – vocal engineer
- Kevin Metcalfe – mastering engineer

== Charts ==
Chart (1980)	Peak position
UK Albums (Official Charts)	37
