= Babylon and On =

Studio album by Squeeze
- Released: 7 September 1987
- Recorded: July 1986 – June 1987
- Studio: Swanyard Studios (Islington, London); AIR Studios, (Oxford Street, London); The Workhouse (Old Kent Road, London); Odyssey Studios (Marble Arch, London); The Wool Hall (Bath, Somerset); The Hit Factory (New York City, New York)
- Genre: New wave, pop rock
- Length: 42:05
- Label: A&M
- Producer: Eric "ET" Thorngren; Glenn Tilbrook

Squeeze chronology
Cosi Fan Tutti Frutti (1985)	Babylon and On (1987)	Frank (1989)

Singles from Babylon and On
- 1. "Hourglass" Released: July 1987; 2. "Trust Me to Open My Mouth" Released: September 1987; 3. "The Waiting Game" Released: November 1987; 4. "853-5937" Released: January 1988 (UK), February 1988 (US); 5. "Footprints" Released: June 1988

Babylon and On is the seventh album by the British new wave group Squeeze, released in September 1987.

== History ==
Eric "ET" Thorngren produced the album, along with Glenn Tilbrook. The group officially expanded to a sextet with the addition of former Soft Boys member Andy Metcalfe; a bassist in that group. But here, Metcalfe was used as a second keyboard player (behind Jools Holland). However, despite being pictured and billed as a full member of the band, the track-by-track musician listings included with this album reveal that Metcalfe only played on three songs: "Tough Love", "The Prisoner" and "Some Americans". Metcalfe left Squeeze before their next album was recorded, although he worked again with Glenn Tilbrook during his solo years. The album peaked at number 14 in the UK Albums Chart, the highest ranking there for a Squeeze album, aside from greatest hits compilations, until Cradle to the Grave (2015) reached number 12.

== Release ==
The album was released in September 1987 and gave them their biggest US hit single, "Hourglass." The song became an unexpected US hit for the band, reaching number 15 on the Billboard Hot 100, which Chris Difford attributed to the video for the song as much as the song itself: "I would think that the video has had a lot to do with it. It's been played a lot, and everybody you speak to compliments you on it. When you meet fans after gigs, they say, 'Your video's great'. They don't say, 'Your album's great'. So it's the first thing they think of."

The second single, "Trust Me to Open My Mouth", was released in the UK in September 1987. It reached number 72 in the UK Singles Chart. In North America, this song was not released as a single. Instead, "853-5937" was the second single from Babylon and On in Canada and the US.

"853-5937" was written by Glenn Tilbrook and Chris Difford. The song began life as an answering machine jingle that Tilbrook used, with 853-5937 being Tilbrook's phone number at the time. "853-5937" was released January 1988 (UK) as the fourth single, and February 1988 (US) as the second single. It landed at number 91 in the UK charts, and climbing to number 32 on the US Hot 100 chart and number 38 on the US Cash Box chart. Despite the song's commercial success, both Tilbrook and Difford have commented on their dislike for the song and have blocked the song from appearing on compilation albums. Difford recalled, "It's a very lame song. I liked it at the time, but you change your mind about how you feel about certain songs."

=== Music video ===
The music video shows many black and white clips, as well as the band performing in what appears to be the inside of a telephone, as they are surrounded by oversized electronics and circuitry. Bassist Keith Wilkinson can be seen playing an Ormston fretless bass.

== Music ==
Chris Woodstra opined Babylon and On to be a "return to the more straight-ahead pop of their classic period".

== Reception ==
Professional ratings
Review scores
Source	Rating
AllMusic	3/5 stars
Number One	3/5 stars
Record Mirror	3/5 stars

AllMusic gave a mixed summary of Babylon and On. Although reviewer Chris Woodstra held the album's resurrection of older sounds to be "a welcome one", he opined that the move seemed "forced", despite noting "some moments of inspiration".

== Track listing ==
All songs written by Chris Difford and Glenn Tilbrook.

1. "Hourglass" – 3:16
2. "Footprints" – 3:49
3. "Tough Love" – 3:07
4. "The Prisoner" – 4:06
5. "853-5937" – 3:16
6. "In Today's Room" – 3:28
7. "Trust Me to Open My Mouth" – 3:12
8. "Striking Matches" – 3:02
9. "Cigarette of a Single Man" – 3:29
10. "Who Are You?" – 3:30
11. "The Waiting Game" – 3:06
12. "Some Americans" – 4:40

=== Bonus tracks on UK CD version ===
13. "Splitting into Three" – 3:35
14. "Wedding Bells" – 2:21

=== Bonus tracks on Japanese CD version ===
13. "Wedding Bells" – 2:21
14. "Take Me I'm Yours" (live) – 4:04

== Personnel ==
Squeeze

- Chris Difford – backing vocals, guitars (1–9, 12), co-lead vocals (3), lead vocals (8), acoustic guitar (10), nylon guitar (11)
- Glenn Tilbrook – lead and backing vocals, guitars (1–4, 6, 9, 12), horns (1), keyboards (2, 3, 4, 6, 9, 10), banjo (3), lead guitar (5, 7), percussion (6), electric guitar (10, 11), acoustic piano (12), sequencing (12), sitar (12)
- Jools Holland – organ (1, 3–10), acoustic piano (4–7, 9, 11), keyboards (9)
- Andy Metcalfe – keyboards (3, 4), Moog synthesizer (4), horns (4, 12)
- Keith Wilkinson – bass (1–7, 9, 10, 11), basses (8, 12), backing vocals (7)
- Gilson Lavis – drums, percussion (2, 5, 6, 8, 9, 10), tambourine (12)

Additional personnel

- T-Bone Wolk – accordion (3, 8, 12)
- Del Newman – string arrangements and conductor (11)
- Monique Dyan – backing vocals (4, 5, 6, 10), lead vocals (8)
- Pam Baker, Stewart Dunning, Mike Sheerie, Glenn Tilbrook and Keith Wilkinson – mob vocals (8)

Production

- Glenn Tilbrook – producer
- Eric "ET" Thorngren – producer, arrangements, engineer, mixing
- Squeeze – arrangements
- Roger Dobson – assistant engineer
- Spencer Henderson – assistant engineer
- John Lee – assistant engineer
- Lance Phillips – assistant engineer
- Steve Williams – assistant engineer
- Gary Wright – assistant engineer
- Femi Jiya – additional engineer (6, 7)
- Jack Skinner – mastering at Sterling Sound (New York City, New York, USA)
- Stylorouge – design
- Nels Israelson – photography

== Charts ==
Chart performance for Babylon and On
Chart (1987)	Peak position
Australian Albums (Kent Music Report)	84
UK Albums (OCC)	14
