= How the West Was One =

How the West Was One may refer to:

- How the West Was One (Cali Agents album), 2000
- How the West Was One (2nd Chapter of Acts, Phil Keaggy and a band called David album), 1977
- How the West Was One (Carbon Leaf album), 2010

== See also ==
- How the West Was Won (disambiguation)
