= Freddie Stevenson =

- Freddie Stevenson at The Cutting Room, New York, February 2007

Background information
- Born: Frederick Gunner Stevenson; 9 March 1980 (age 46); Hereford, England
- Origin: Edinburgh, Scotland
- Genres: Rock, acoustic rock, folk rock
- Occupations: Singer-songwriter, guitarist
- Instruments: Vocals, guitar, piano
- Years active: 2004–present
- Label: Juicy Musical Creations
- Website: www.freddiestevenson.net

Freddie Stevenson (born 9 March 1980 in Hereford, England) is a Scottish singer-songwriter from Edinburgh.

== Biography ==
=== Early life ===
Stevenson is the eldest of three children born to Scottish artist and potter Charles Stevenson and children's television writer and producer Jocelyn Stevenson, co-creator of the popular programme Fraggle Rock. Stevenson was educated at Harrow School in north-west London from 1993 to 1998 during which time he taught himself to play guitar before moving to RADA to study drama.

=== Acting ===
Upon graduating from RADA in 2002, he appeared in a number of television and stage roles including Cambridge Spies, in which he appeared briefly, and State of Play, in which he was on-screen for just under thirty seconds. Latterly he toured both the UK and USA in Sir Peter Hall's 2003 & 2004 production of As You Like It, which included significant runs at both Brooklyn Academy of Music and the Los Angeles Music Center, during which time he became involved in a long-term relationship with co-star actress Rebecca Hall.

=== Early song writing ===
Having always enjoyed writing songs and playing them to his friends, Stevenson eventually started collaborating with John Perry of The Only Ones in the middle of 2004. Culminating in a set of four well received acoustic demos, they began with a series of low key gigs around London and Edinburgh before embarking on a recording an acoustic EP that saw a limited release and was sold at live concerts, before being made available via the iTunes Music Store.

=== Body on the Line ===
In the summer of 2005, Perry introduced Stevenson to a group of Stockholm-based musicians comprising Brady Blade (Dave Matthews & Friends, Emmylou Harris, Steve Earle, Bob Dylan) on drums, Surjo Benigh (Ulf Lundell) on bass, and Jan Petersson (Eric Bibb, Odetta) on keyboards. Recording sessions took place in Stockholm and London, and were mastered by Ted Jensen at Sterling Sound, New York.

=== Nashville sessions ===
Throughout the period of completing Body on the Line, Stevenson continued writing feverishly and new songs were regularly aired whilst touring in support of the first record. Shortly after the first LP's release in December 2006, Stevenson and Perry took residence in Nashville, Tennessee at Ocean Way Studios without a particular aim other than to record some new music. Re-joining Stevenson was drummer Brady Blade who suggested bass player Chris Donohue and multi-instrumentalist Phil Madeira be included in the band. The sessions were recorded and mixed by Prince's engineer and producer David Z. 19 songs were recorded by the group, with 15 of these ultimately being mixed at a second session in February 2007.

== Discography ==
- EP (2004)
- Body on The Line (2006)
- All My Strange Companions (2008)
- Blongs (2010)
- The City Is King (2011)
- Love Machine (2014)
