= Harri Kakoulli =

British musician (born 1952)

- Also known as: Harry Kakoulli
- Born: 17 December 1952 (age 73); Deptford, England
- Genres: New wave; world; disco
- Occupations: Musician, producer
- Instruments: Bass; guitar; percussion; vocals
- Years active: 1973–present
- Formerly of: England's Glory; Squeeze

Harri Kakoulli (born 17 December 1952), sometimes spelled Harry Kakoulli, is a British musician, best known for being the original bass player for Squeeze from 1975 to 1979. After releasing one new wave solo album, Even When I'm Not, in 1980, Kakoulli turned to world music: he has produced and released his own records since.

== Early life ==
Kakoulli was born in Deptford, South London to a Greek family.

== Career ==
In 1973, Kakoulli, his sister Zena, and Peter Perrett formed the band England's Glory together, and recorded an album that wasn't release upon completion, before disbanding in 1974.

Kakoulli joined Squeeze in 1975, after the band had struggled on finding a bass player. He played on the bands first two studio albums, and their first two big hit songs, "Cool for Cats" and "Up the Junction", both songs peaking at number 2 in the UK charts in 1979, however Kakoulli was fired and replaced by John Bentley in March 1979, before the release of either single and the Cool for Cats album; Kakoulli appears on the back cover of the album. His reason for departing Squeeze has never been made official, however the bands website previously claimed that he left "to pursue his disco muse".

In 1980, he released his first solo album, Even When I'm Not; the album, mastered by George Peckham, is mostly-independent, apart from a few guitar and drum tracks by session musicians including Hamish Stuart and Kevin Armstrong. From 1981 to 1982, he played in the band True Life Confessions, that included John Dummer from Darts.

Kakoulli is now a solo artist and producer, and has worked in making world music since the mid-1980s. He has produced albums for The Ukrainians, Jackie Leven, and Jocelyn Brown, and has worked with Sunny Ade and Talvin Singh, and claims to have released over two-thousand singles, five-hundred of those under his own label, HKO records. In 2014, he released a single, "Christmas Isn't Christmas Anymore", with the proceeds going to Freedom Dolls Initiative, a charity to support victims of trafficking.

In a 2014 interview with John Bentley, his replacement in Squeeze, he said that Kakoulli came "out on top in my book" out of all of the bands former bass players. One of Harri's favourite bass players was Rick Danko of The Band.

== Personal life ==
Kakoulli's younger sister was musician Koulla Kakoulli, who died in 2018. His brother-in-law is Peter Perrett, who has been married to his sister Xenoulla since 1970.

He now lives in Larnaca, Cyprus.

== Discography ==
=== Albums ===
Year	Title	Notes
1978	Squeeze	Squeeze album
1979	Cool for Cats	Squeeze album
1980	Even When I'm Not	Solo album
1989	The Legendary Lost Album	England's Glory album
1991	The Ukrainians	The Ukrainians album / producer
1992	Pisni Iz the Smiths	The Ukrainians album / producer
1994	The Mystery of Love Is Greater than the Mystery of Death	Jackie Leven album / engineer
1994	Vorony	The Ukrainians album / producer
2000	Turn on the Hits	Jocelyn Brown singer / composer
2007	Bliss Like Gold	Solo album

=== Singles ===
Year	Label	A-side	B-side
1980	Oval records	"I'm On A Rocket"	"I Wanna Stay"
1983	New York Connexion	"She's Mine"	"She's Mine In Dub"
1983	Strut	"Sugar Daddy"	"Sugar Daddy (Dub)"
1983	Strut	"Lonely Boy"	"I Don't Need You Any More"
