= The Last Temptation of Chris =

Studio album by Chris Difford
- Released: April 7, 2008
- Genre: Pop, rock
- Label: Stiff

Chris Difford chronology
South East Side Story (2006)	The Last Temptation of Chris (2008)	Cashmere If You Can (2010)

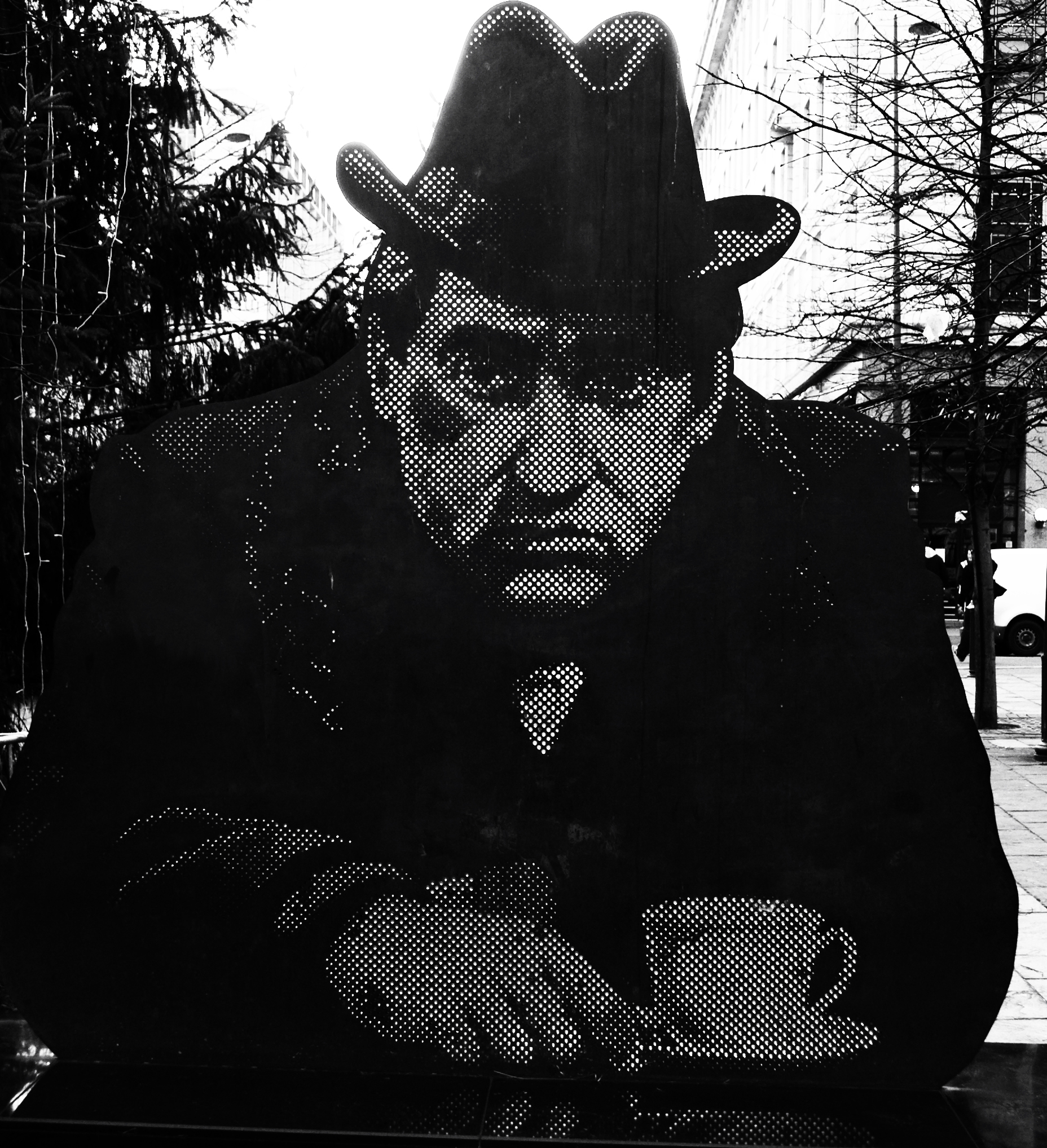
Public art of Tony Hancock

The Last Temptation of Chris is an album by Chris Difford, one of the founding members of the new wave band Squeeze. It was released on 7 April 2008. This is his second solo album, a follow-up to I Didn't Get Where I Am in 2002. It is dedicated to Difford's brother, Les, who died before its release. The title is a play on The Last Temptation of Christ. The cover shows Difford slouched at a counter with a cup of coffee and wearing a black Homburg hat and a black Astrakhan coat, in homage to the comedian Tony Hancock as depicted in a photograph.

== Track listing ==
1. "Come on Down" – 3:32
2. "Broken Family" – 3:04
3. "Battersea Boys" – 4:06
4. "On My Own I'm Never Bored" – 4:06
5. "Julian and Sandy" – 3:37
6. "The Other Man in my Life" – 3:53
7. "My Mother's Handbag" – 3:47
8. "Fat as a Fiddle" – 3:25
9. "The Gates of Eden" – 3:56
10. "Reverso" – 5:38
11. "Never Coming Back" – 3:32
12. "Good Life" – 3:09
13. "The Party's Over" – 3:48

== Personnel ==
- Chris Difford – vocals, guitar
- Melvin Duffy – guitar, lap steel, pedal steel, weissenborn, banjo
- Boo Hewerdine – guitar, backing vocals, piano
- Dorie Jackson – backing vocals
- Simon Little – bass guitar
- Pete Long – clarinet
- Neil MacColl – guitar
- David Marks – bass guitar
- John Parricelli – guitar
- Mark Taylor – piano, organ
- Enrico Tomasso – trumpet, brass
- Jim Watson – piano
- Tim Weller – drums

== Other credits ==
- All songs written by Chris Difford and Boo Hewerdine, except "Battersea Boys" and "The Party’s Over" written by Chris Difford and Geoff Martyn
- Produced by Boo Hewerdine, Chris Difford and John Wood
- Engineered by John Wood and Ian Davenport
- Cover phototograph: Roy Burimston
- Mastered by Tim Young
