= England's Glory (band) =

British 70s band

England's Glory were Peter Perrett's pre-The Only Ones band and included Perrett on guitar and vocals, Jon Newey on drums and percussion, Harri Kakoulli (later of Squeeze) on bass and Dave Clarke on lead guitar. They received little attention from record companies and failed to secure a record deal. Perrett's vocal style at the time was reminiscent of Lou Reed, and NME journalist, Nick Kent, was almost fooled into believing that the acetate of England's Glory demos was, in fact, a bootleg of Velvet Underground outtakes. All of the band's recordings have now been issued since the success of The Only Ones.

The band's first album, unreleased at the time and commonly known as The Legendary Lost Album, was composed of 13 tracks, two of which, "Peter & The Pets" and "City of Fun", would go on to be recorded by The Only Ones. A final album, The First and Last, was released on CD in 2005, and included the band's 1973 EMI recordings and 1973 acoustic demos.

== Discography ==
=== Compilations ===
- The Legendary Lost Album (Anagram, 1989)
- The First and Last (Diesel Motor, 2005)
