= The Only Ones (album) =

Studio album by the Only Ones
- Released: April 1978 (UK)
- Genre: Power pop; new wave; punk rock
- Length: 33:49
- Label: Columbia
- Producer: The Only Ones; Robert Ash

The Only Ones chronology
The Only Ones (1978)	Even Serpents Shine (1979)

The Only Ones is the debut studio album by the English power pop band the Only Ones, released in April 1978 by Columbia Records. It was produced by the Only Ones themselves, with the assistance of Robert Ash and was mixed at Basing St., Escape and CBS.

Steve Lillywhite who had started his career the year before the album was released, was credited for various engineering on the album. Lillywhite would later go on to become a Grammy Award-winning producer. Also Mick Gallagher known for his work with Ian Dury and the Blockheads provided keyboards on the album.

The album was re-released in Europe in 2009 on Sony Music Entertainment, featuring bonus content. The reissue was a CD which comprises 13-tracks. It includes the original album digitally remastered from the original 1/2" mix tapes; alongside three bonus tracks.

== Critical reception ==
Professional ratings
Review scores
Source	Rating
AllMusic	4.5/5 stars
The Encyclopedia of Popular Music	5/5 stars
The Irish Times	4/5 stars
Mojo	4/5 stars
Record Collector	4/5 stars
Sounds	5/5 stars
Spin Alternative Record Guide	10/10

Trouser Press called it "the best of the three original albums" in which "Perrett's languid vocals and songs provide the character and focus, while the band's skills carry it off handsomely". The album is still widely admired by British critics. In 1994, The Encyclopedia of Popular Music named The Only Ones one of the 50 best punk albums of all-time. The compilers claimed that the Only Ones were "the closest thing the UK had to Johnny Thunders' Heartbreakers, a laconic, shamble of a band who were, at moments, touched by a creative greatness that made you get out of the glare".

Since the end of the 1990s, the album has also appeared on several all-time greatest albums lists. The album was also included in the book 1001 Albums You Must Hear Before You Die (2006).

== Track listing ==
All tracks are written by Peter Perrett

Side one
No.	Title	Length
1.	"The Whole of the Law"	2:38
2.	"Another Girl, Another Planet"	3:02
3.	"Breaking Down"	4:52
4.	"City of Fun"	3:32
5.	"The Beast"	5:47

Side two
No.	Title	Length
6.	"Creature of Doom"	2:35
7.	"It's the Truth"	2:07
8.	"Language Problem"	2:28
9.	"No Peace for the Wicked"	2:51
10.	"The Immortal Story"	3:57
Total length:		33:49

2009 remastered version bonus tracks
No.	Title	Length
11.	"Lovers of Today"	3:12
12.	"Peter and the Pets"	3:04
13.	"As My Wife Says"	1:53

== Personnel ==
The Only Ones

- Peter Perrett – lead and background vocals, guitars, keyboards
- John Perry – guitars, keyboards
- Alan Mair – bass guitars
- Mike Kellie – drums

Session musicians

- Mick Gallagher – keyboards
- Gordon Edwards – keyboards
- Raphael & Friends – horns
- Koulla Kakoulli – backing vocals

Production team

- Robert Ash – production, engineering
- The Only Ones – production
- Ed Hollis – various engineering
- Steve Lillywhite – various engineering
- John Burns – various engineering
- Ian Maidman – various engineering
- John Dent – mastering
- Peter "Kodick" Gravelle – cover photography

== Charts ==
Chart (1978)	Peak position
UK Albums (OCC)	56
