= The One (band) =

The One were a British band formed to back Peter Perrett on his first new material since the Only Ones originally split up in 1981.

== Background ==
Perrett initially started work with Miyuki, who was a keyboard player and was his manager's wife. A full band was then assembled via advertisements in Melody Maker. Richard Vernon was recruited on bass guitar, Steve Hands on drums and Jay Price on guitar.

The first release by Peter Perrett & The One was an EP of demos entitled Cultured Palate. Another EP was released to precede the album, Woke Up Sticky. The band toured extensively, but split by 1999 due to Perrett's unreliable behaviour.
