= The Beatstalkers =

Scottish musical group

The Beatstalkers are a Glasgow beat group that formed in 1962. They were sometimes billed as "the Scottish Beatles", because of the hordes of screaming girls attending their concerts, and like other Scottish beat groups The Poets, The Athenians and The Pathfinders, specialised in covers of US hits.

== History ==
In 1962, Alan Mair and Eddie Campbell formed the Glasgow band with a lineup including Davie Lennox on vocals, Eddie Campbell on guitar, Alan Mair on bass and ‘Tudge’ Williamson on drums (replaced by Jeff Allen). Later Ronnie Smith joined the group on rhythm guitar. Under the management of Joe Gaffney, the band went on to become Scotland's "top group" at the time. Their roadie was Joe's oldest son, William.

The group came to the attention of Decca Records in London after their riotous concert in George Square, Glasgow. However the band were unable to translate the same success they had in Scotland into success in England. They decided to split in 1969 after their van was stolen with all their equipment in it. The group's final three singles all featured songs written by a then-unknown David Bowie.

Alan Mair went on to play with the Only Ones and drummer Jeff Allen played with East of Eden. The Beatstalkers played a reunion concert on 23 December 2005 in Glasgow.

== Discography ==
- Scotland's No.1 Beat Group (2005) (Recorded between 1963-1969)

=== Singles ===
- "Ev'rybody's Talking 'bout My Baby" / "Mr. Disappointed" Decca 1965
- "Left Right Left" / "You'd Better Get a Better Hold On", both written by Tommy Scott. Decca 1966
- "A Love Like Yours" / "Base Line" Decca 1966
- "My One Chance to Make It" / "Ain't No Soul (Left in These Ole Shoes)" (as Beatstalkers) CBS 1967
- "Silver Tree Top School for Boys" (written by David Bowie) / "Sugar Chocolate Machine" CBS 1967
- "Rain Coloured Roses" / "Everything Is You" (Bowie) CBS 1968
- "Little Boy" / "When I'm Five" (Bowie) CBS 1969
