= 853-5937 =

1988 single by Squeeze

Single by Squeeze

from the album Babylon and On
- Released: December 1987 (US) January 1988 (UK)
- Genre: Soul
- Length: 3:21
- Label: A&M
- Songwriters: Glenn Tilbrook, Chris Difford
- Producers: Eric "ET" Thorngren, Glenn Tilbrook

Squeeze singles chronology
"The Waiting Game" (1987)	"853-5937" (1987)	"Footprints" (1988)

"853-5937" is a song by English rock band Squeeze released on the band's 1987 album Babylon and On. Released as the fourth UK single and the second US single from the album, "853-5937" was a moderate chart hit in both nations, reaching number 91 in the UK and climbing to number 32 on the US Hot 100 chart and number 38 on the US Cash Box chart.

== Background ==
"853-5937" was written by Glenn Tilbrook and Chris Difford. The song began life as an answering machine jingle that Tilbrook used, with 853-5937 being Tilbrook's phone number at the time. Though Tilbrook and Difford traditionally wrote separately, the songwriting duo wrote "Hourglass" and "853-5937" while in the same room. Tilbrook recalled, "We didn't write everything together. I think the first song we ever wrote, we wrote together. And then we wrote 'Hourglass' and '853-5937' together. And that was it [until 1993's Some Fantastic Place]."

Despite the song's commercial success, both Tilbrook and Difford have commented on their dislike for the song and have blocked the song from appearing on compilation albums. Difford recalled, "It's a very lame song. I liked it at the time, but you change your mind about how you feel about certain songs."

== Release ==
"853-5937" was released as a single in both the US and the UK. Coming off the success of "Hourglass", the band's biggest pop hit in the US, "853-5937" peaked at number 32 in the US. The song was the band's second and final top 40 hit in the US.

=== Music video ===
Squeeze produced a music video for "853-5937", directed by Adrian Edmondson. The music video shows many black and white clips, as well as the band performing in what appears to be the inside of a telephone, as they are surrounded by oversized electronics and circuitry. Bassist Keith Wilkinson can be seen playing an Ormston fretless bass.

== Critical reception ==
The Rolling Stone Album Guide described the song as "equally charming" as "Hourglass", Squeeze's biggest hit from Babylon & On.

== Track listing ==
=== 7" ===
1. "853-5937" (3:21)
2. "Tough Love" (3:06)

=== 12" ===
1. "853-5937" (3:21)
2. "Tough Love" (3:06)
3. "853-5937 (Bonus Buff mix)" (3:26)

=== 7" (North American release) ===
1. "853-5937" (3:21)
2. "Take Me I'm Yours (live)" (4:03)
