= Hourglass (Squeeze song) =

Single by Squeeze

from the album Babylon and On
- B-side: "Wedding Bells"
- Released: July 1987 (UK)
- Length: 3:16
- Label: A&M
- Songwriters: Glenn Tilbrook and Chris Difford
- Producers: Eric "ET" Thorngren & Glenn Tilbrook

Squeeze singles chronology
"King George Street" (1986)	"Hourglass" (1987)	"Trust Me To Open My Mouth" (1987)

"Hourglass" is the first single released from Squeeze's seventh album, Babylon and On. Aided by an optical illusion-filled music video directed by Ade Edmondson, it received substantial airplay on MTV, and "Hourglass" became the highest-charting hit the band ever had in the United States, peaking at number 15 on the Billboard Hot 100, while reaching number 16 in the UK Singles Chart.

== Background ==
"Hourglass" was written by Chris Difford and Glenn Tilbrook together in one room; traditionally, the two had written the lyrics and music, respectively, to their songs individually, but, at Tilbrook's suggestion, the two collaborated more directly for "Hourglass". Difford recalled, "I went to Glenn's house and within an hour we'd written 'Hourglass.' Glenn counteracted some lyrical ideas and I added some musical ideas, then he demoed it and made some changes, and finally the band got hold of it and changed it some more."

Difford stated that the song "doesn't mean much" lyrically, while Tilbrook described the chorus' lyrics as "nonsense words". Tilbrook has also stated, "In many ways, the song 'Hourglass' is about the crisis we felt looking ahead and seeing our chances for success running out." Musically, Tilbrook wrote the chorus; he explained, "I loved the idea of rapid delivery, which is what the chorus required." Originally written as a more dance-style number, the song took on, in the words of Tilbrook, a typical "Squeeze sound". "Our reference point was, what would Talking Heads do with this song?" Tilbrook explained. The song's break and sound effects were contributed by producer Eric "ET" Thorngren.

== Release ==
"Hourglass" was released as the debut single from Babylon & On and became one of the band's biggest hits, reaching number 15 in the US and number 16 in the UK. The single remains the band's highest-charting single in the US. Tilbrook argued that the negative lyrics were "ironic considering it went on to be a chart hit".

The single's success was bolstered by a music video directed by Ade Edmondson, who was recruited by keyboardist Jools Holland. The video featured the band performing the song in a set with surrealist art and optical illusions. The video received an MTV Award for its Art Direction by Nick Edwards and Clive Crotty. Difford later said, "The reason this song exists in my mind is purely for the video."

== Critical reception ==
The Rolling Stone Album Guide described the song as a "tuneful trifle" and noted it as the "standout track" from Babylon & On. Diffuser.fm called it "one of Squeeze's most danceable tunes."

== Track listing ==
- 7"
  1. "Hourglass" (3:16)
  2. "Wedding Bells" (2:22)
- 12"
  1. "Hourglass" (3:16)
  2. "Splitting into Three" (3:33)
  3. "Wedding Bells" (2:22)

== Charts ==
Chart (1987)	Peak position
Australia (Kent Music Report)	90
Italy Airplay (Music & Media)	11
UK Singles (OCC)	16
US Billboard Hot 100	15
