= Alan Mair =

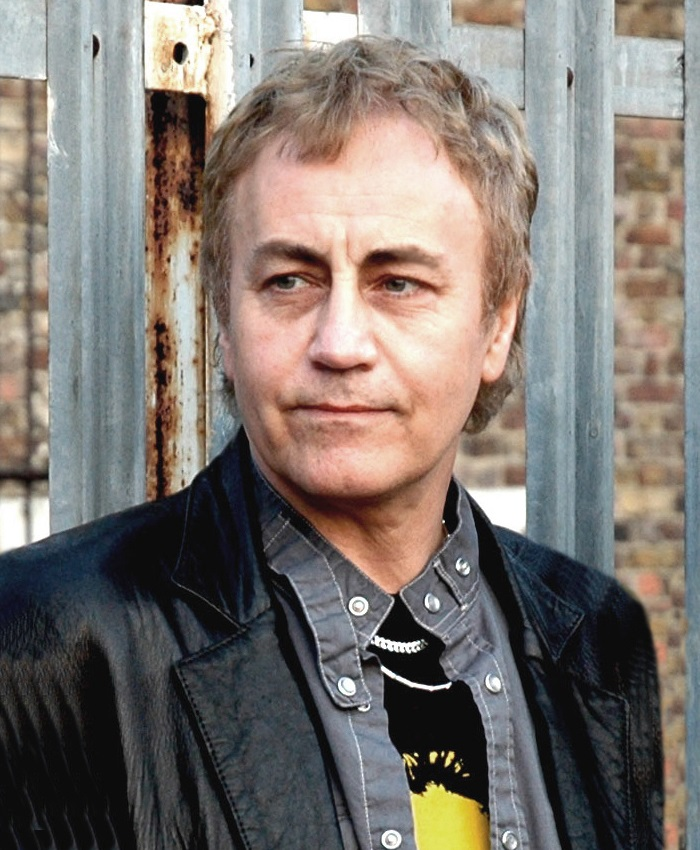
- Mair in 2008

Background information
- Born: London, England
- Origin: Glasgow, Scotland
- Genres: Punk rock; new wave; power pop
- Occupations: Singer; songwriter; musician; record producer
- Instruments: Vocals; bass guitar; drums
- Years active: 1960s–present
- Label: IKA
- Member of: The Only Ones
- Formerly of: The Beatstalkers
- Website: alanmair.com

Alan Mair is a Scottish musician, songwriter and record producer.

Mair's music career spans more than 40 years. He came to prominence in the late 1970s as the co-founder and bass guitarist for the English rock band the Only Ones, co-producing their second studio album Even Serpents Shine (1979) and writing and singing "My Way Out of Here" for their third and final album Baby's Got a Gun (1980). They released a top 60 hit in 1992 with the single "Another Girl, Another Planet". The band has maintained a cult following throughout its existence.

Mair began his solo career in 2014, while still a member of the Only Ones.

== Career ==
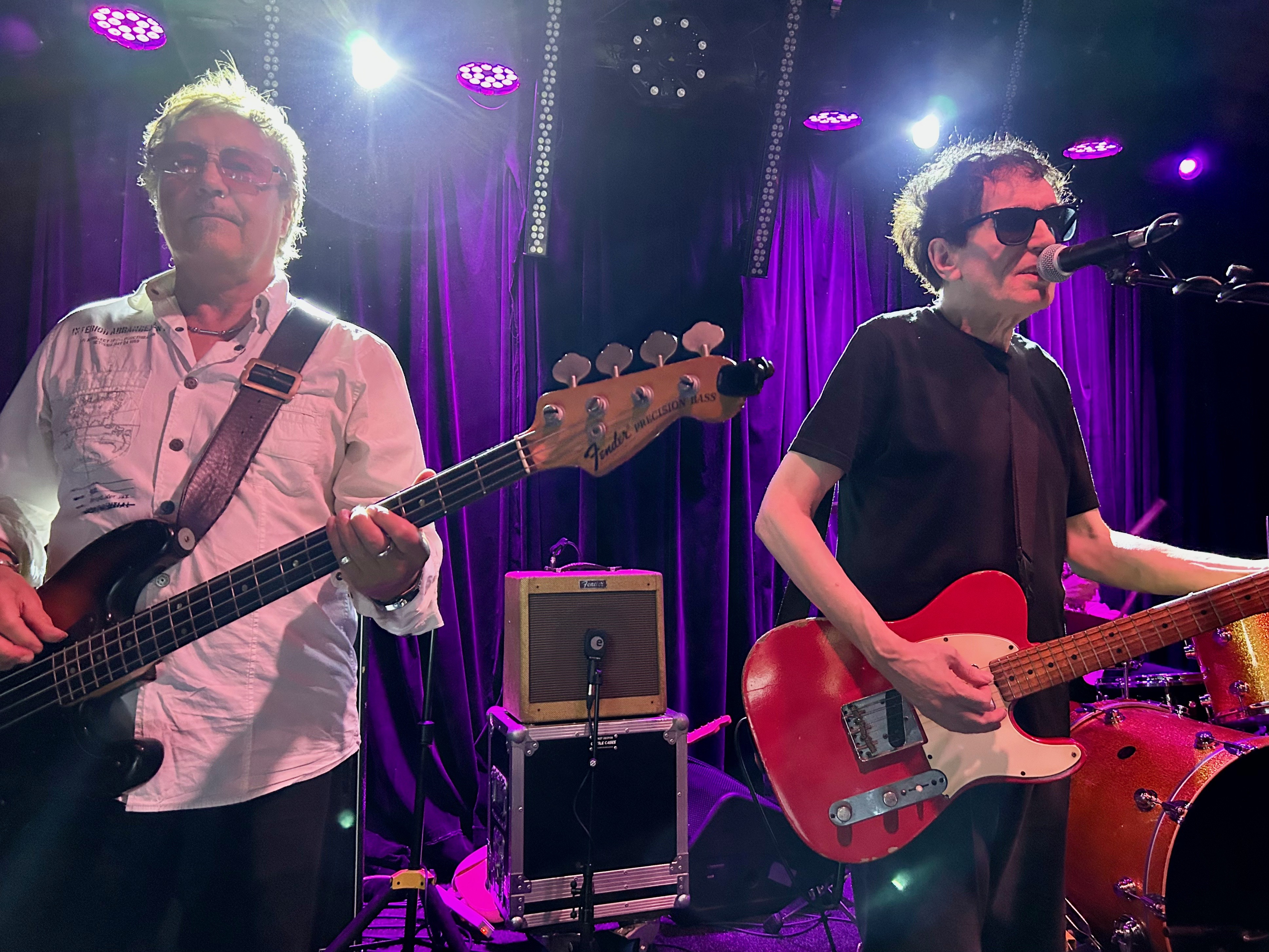
The Only Ones performing in 2023, left to right: Mair (bass), and Peter Perrett (vocals)

Mair grew up in the Glasgow area. He began playing guitar at about age 13 and gained experience in various bands during the 1960s. In 1962, Mair and Eddie Campbell formed the Glasgow band The Beatstalkers. The line-up included Davie Lennox on vocals, Eddie Campbell on guitar, Mair on bass and 'Tudge' Williamson on drums (replaced by Jeff Allen). Later Ronnie Smith joined the group on rhythm guitar. Under the management of Joe Gaffney, the band went on to become Scotland's "top group" at the time. They were called the "Scottish Beatles" by the local press because of the screaming and riots that occurred anywhere they made an appearance; although the band toured England and Europe many times, had a 6-week sell-out residency at the famous Marquee Club and performed on the TV show Ready Steady Go!, they never achieved the same dizzy heights of success as they did in Scotland. The band signed a recording contract with Decca Records. Their records sold thousands of copies in Scotland, but with only two chart shops in Scotland their sales made no impact on the UK charts. They split in 1969 after their van was stolen with all their equipment in it.

After The Beatstalkers decided to call it a day in 1969 Mair began making leather clothes and hand made boots for rock bands the likes of Yes, Santana, The Tremolos, David Bowie, Uriah Heep and many more. A short time later in 1970 he opened shops in Kensington Market, Kings Road and High street Kensington selling handmade leather stacked heel boots which he was making in his own factory in Kentish Town. In 1971 he employed Freddie Mercury of the rock band Queen at his Kensington Market shop as his shop manager from 1971 until 1974. On one occasion after being at a party Freddie told Alan that everyone at the party, including the girls, had his boots on, and said "I don’t know if you realise but you’re not considered hip unless you have on a pair of Alan Mair boots".

After a five-year spell in the fashion world Mair was drawn back to the music business. He joined the Al Matthews Band. who had a couple of hit records. When The Al Matthews band split, Mair answered an advert in Melody Maker and went for an audition with Roger Chapman’s band “Streetwalkers” at Mano’s Studios in Lots Road. During a break he wandered into the studio next door and found himself watching The Only Ones rehearse. On leaving the studio Mike Kellie enquired who Mair was and found out he was a bass player. Without hearing him play Kellie said he felt a spiritual connection and that he was the bass player they were looking for. He joined The Only Ones in August 1976. They signed to CBS and recorded three studio albums, of which their first album The Only Ones and Even Serpents Shine received critical acclaim. The Only Ones included lead vocalist Peter Perrett, guitarist John Perry and drummer and ex-Spooky Tooth member Mike Kellie. Their first single, "Lovers of Today", was self-released on the Vengeance record label, and a year later they signed to CBS. Their next single "Another Girl, Another Planet" became the band's best-known song. The band released The Only Ones in 1978. The next year they released Even Serpents Shine, and a year later, they released their final studio album, Baby's Got a Gun. In the summer of 1980, they supported the Who on their tour of the United States. In 1982, the band officially disbanded. In subsequent years, The Only Ones gained a cult following, and compilation albums now outnumber their official studio albums.

== Later career ==
In 2002, Mair was asked if he wanted to record a Frankie Miller song for an album that was a tribute to Miller's song writing, and also a fundraiser for the Glaswegian musician who was recovering from a brain haemorrhage. The release of the album was followed in September 2002 by a concert at the Barrowland Ballroom, Glasgow, at which Mair performed. He said, "It was an amazing night full of Scottish talent and it was a blast to be performing at the Barrowland again".

Mair currently lives in London and has played in both of his band reunions. On 23 December 2005, he played in a Beatstalkers reunion in Glasgow.

In 2007, Mair was the driving force in reforming the Only Ones, who performed to a sell-out show at Shepherd's Bush Empire. This was followed by shows at the O2 Wireless Festival in London's Hyde Park and Harewood House in Yorkshire with the White Stripes, and the first ever Connect Festival at Inveraray Castle in Scotland where they shared bills with Primal Scream, Big Star, and Johnny Marr. In 2009, they extended their touring to take in the Netherlands, Japan, Hultsfred Festival in Sweden, and in 2012, they played at the Rebellion Festival in Blackpool and headlined the Opera House stage in The Winter Gardens on Saturday 4 August. Mair remastered all three CBS studio albums for the band, which were re-released with bonus tracks in February 2009.

In 2014, Mair started to record tracks for a solo album, Field of One, planned for release on his own label, IKA Records. His debut single "Four Winds", taken from the album, was released in December 2014, and his second single, "Stairway to Hell", was released in August 2015. Mair also signed other groups to IKA Records including Zal Cleminson's "Tandoori Cassette" In 2021, he released his third single, "Eyes to the Sky", followed with his fourth release, "The Devil's Porridge", in 2022. The latter highlighted the chilling story of Alfred Nobel opening the largest explosives factory in the world in Scotland in 1870. On 2 February 2024, Mair released his new single, "If I Gave The World a Turn". In 2025, he released the single "Ghost Of You In Me".

On 3rd of August 2026 Alan Mair released his solo album Field of One to positive reviews, with one reviewer calling it a Masterpiece, and he released the lead single from the album "How Could I Let This Happen" on the same day.
