= Chris Difford =

British musician and lyricist (born 1954)

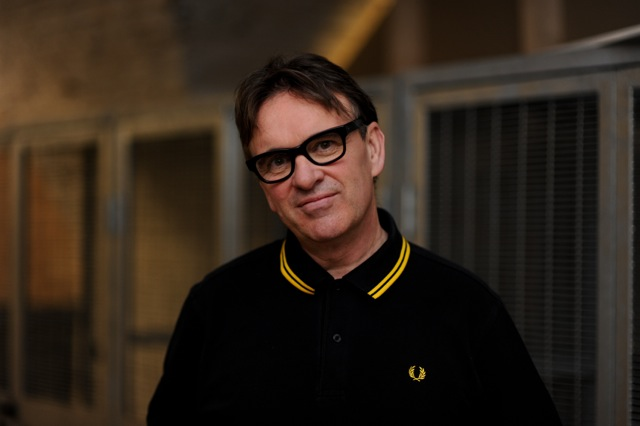
- Difford in September 2013

Background information
- Born: Christopher Henry Difford; 4 November 1954 (age 72); Greenwich, London, England
- Occupations: Musician; songwriter; record producer; singer
- Instruments: Vocals; guitar
- Years active: 1974–present
- Member of: Squeeze
- Website: chrisdifford.com

Christopher Henry Difford (born 4 November 1954) is an English musician. He is a founding member and songwriter of the rock group Squeeze.

Difford is known for his songwriting partnership with Squeeze co-founder Glenn Tilbrook with the pair having released fifteen studio albums together as Squeeze, and an album in 1984 as Difford & Tilbrook.

== Early life ==
Difford was born in Greenwich, London, on 4 November 1954, the youngest of three sons; his older brothers are called Lou and Les. His mother, Isabel (née Hamilton) was from Northern Ireland and met Difford's father Sidney Lewis Difford (1919–2001) while he was stationed in Belfast during World War II. Difford's mother worked in the canteen in the local police station and his father worked as a wages clerk at a gasworks.

At school, Difford suffered from a bad stammer, and had to take Elocution lessons. As a teenager, he was briefly a Skinhead, which he later claimed he only did because all the other boys on the council estate he lived at was one. After he left West Greenwich Comprehensive School at age sixteen, he wanted to start a band, but was told by his parents to get a proper job, and initially became a solicitors clerk, where he worked for fifteen months. He also worked at a cardboard factory flattening boxes, and then worked at a "dodgy local warehouse", and at one point was a film to super 8 reel editor for soft porn films.

== Career ==
=== Music ===
Difford has written lyrics for over 50 years, most notably in partnership with Glenn Tilbrook. The two were primary members in Squeeze and Difford & Tilbrook. According to Difford, he stole 50p from his mother's purse to put a card in a local sweetshop window advertising for a guitarist to join his band, although he did not have one at the time. Tilbrook was the only person who responded to the advert and they met for the first time shortly afterwards. Some of their best-known songs are "Cool for Cats", "Up the Junction", "Pulling Mussels (From the Shell)", "Tempted" and "Black Coffee in Bed".

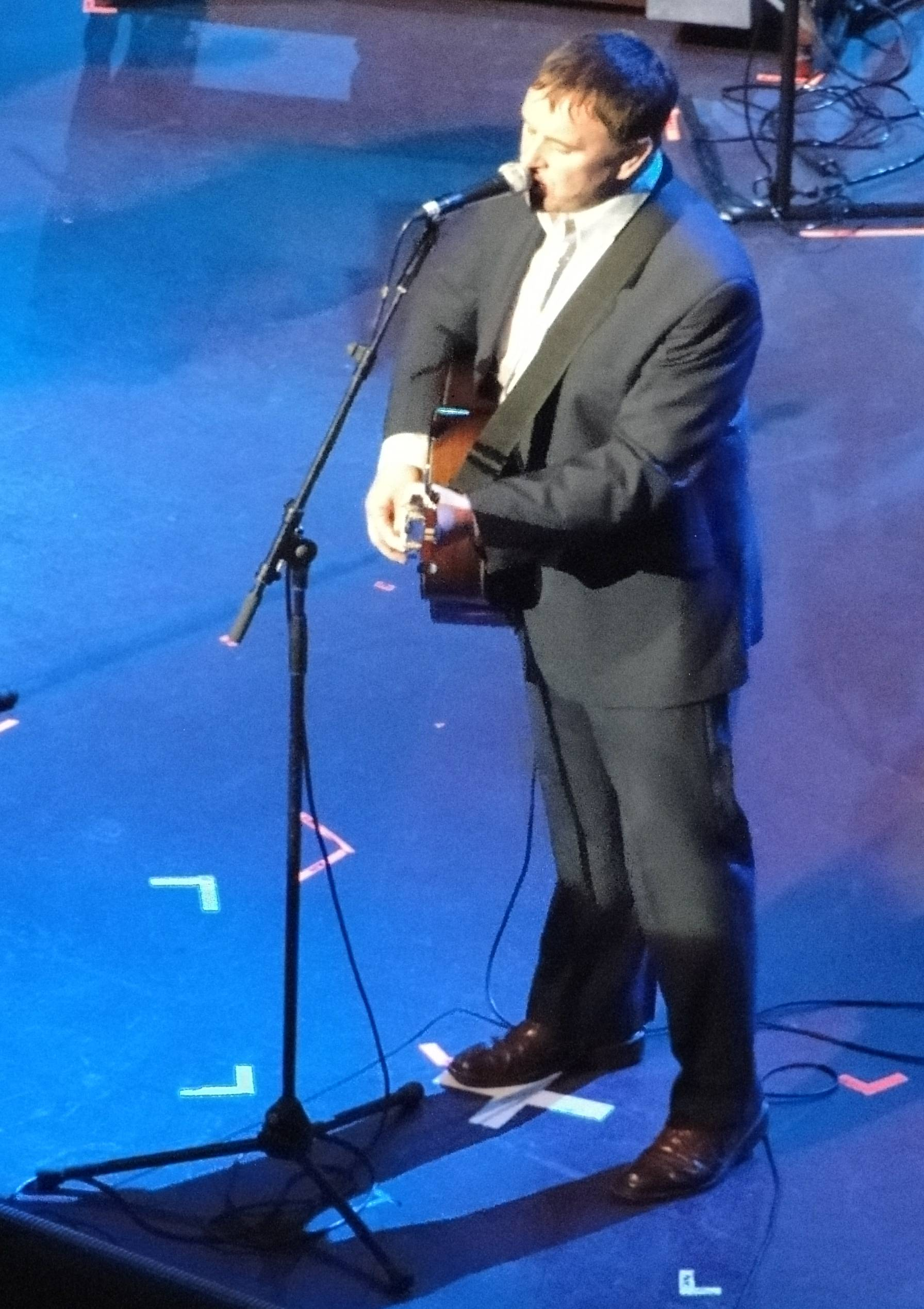
Chris Difford performing at London's Royal Albert Hall, October 2009, in aid of the PRS (Performing Right Society) for Music Members' Benevolent Fund.

After the break-up of Squeeze in 1983, Difford continued writing songs for artists such as Jools Holland, Helen Shapiro, Billy Bremner and Elvis Costello. He has also written lyrics for music by Jools Holland, Elton John, Wet Wet Wet, Marti Pellow and others. He was involved with Tilbrook and John Turner in the creation of a musical, Labelled with Love, which was created using the songs of Squeeze. The 1983 musical performed in Deptford was short-lived. In 1984, the pair released the album Difford and Tilbrook and had a minor hit in the UK with "Love's Crashing Waves" which reached 57 in the UK Singles Chart.

In 1985, Squeeze reunited, having hits in the US with the album Babylon and On, plus the singles "Hourglass" and "853-5937". Difford left the group in 1999 launching a solo career in 2003 with his album I Didn't Get Where I Am. Difford was also manager of Bryan Ferry and The Strypes. Squeeze reunited again in 2007, and Difford maintained a concurrent solo career alongside his work with the band. In March 2010, Difford curated Songs in the Key of London, an evening of music dedicated to the capital at the Barbican Centre, London.

Since 2014, Difford has been running the annual Chris Difford Songwriting Retreat, under the auspices of the Buddy Holly Educational Foundation, providing an opportunity for artists to collaborate with one another to write new songs and create new friendships in a relaxed setting in the English countryside.

In 2017, Difford published his autobiography, Some Fantastic Place: My Life In and Out of Squeeze.

In 2026, he is touring the UK solo with Bruce Foxton, Christopher Cross and Elvis Costello guest appearing at some shows.

=== Podcasts ===
In August 2021, Difford launched a podcast series, I Never Thought It Would Happen, with the charity Help Musicians, a charity he is an ambassador for, speaking to guests including Sting, Robbie Williams and KT Tunstall about the highs and lows of life in music.

In November 2025, Difford announced a new podcast, What Happened?, a musical podcast that also features journalist Mark Smith.

== Personal life ==
Difford was raised in Greenwich. He lived in New York with his first wife and their two children. He then lived in a 700 acre farm in Rye for seventeen years, with the mother of his two youngest children, before he moved to Brighton and Hove in 2005. Currently, he lives just outside Brighton, Sussex, with his wife, Louise, whom he met when on a Radio comedy show, and married in April 2013.

Chris Difford struggled with substance abuse, including with alcohol and cocaine, throughout the 1980s. He first entered rehab in 1990 and has been sober since 1992. While at rehab, he became a Christian, stating: "When I went into rehab, I surrendered to God. I handed over my weakness and my loss of life to him. In doing so, he gave me back this place: a place of love and a place of now." Because of his alcohol addicition, Difford can "hardly remember anything about my younger career".

Despite never being formally diagnosed, Difford believes he has dyslexia, as he struggled with reading and writing when in school.

Although he has never appeared on Desert Island Discs, he has said that if he had to make a list, he would include "Up The Junction", amongst "mostly jazz standards".

== Songwriting ==
Difford was first inspired to write songs by David Bowie. Difford, who during his school years just wrote nursery rhymes, transitioned to songwriting. Through a school teacher, he was introduced to Bob Dylan, and after he was played an album by him, said "suddenly putting words to music made sense to me". Some of his other original songwriting influences included the works of Sammy Cahn and Elvis Costello, but has also mentioned Alex Turner of the Arctic Monkeys as a more recent influence.

Difford said of songwriting in 2019: "I wait for songs to come to me. I never fish for ideas, as I often get let down that way; so, I sit and hope and wait until they drift into view. It’s a spiritual process, I think."

Non-Squeeze songs Difford has written include:

- 1980 "Wrong Again (Let's Face It)" by Rockpile
- 1987 – "One Good Reason" by Paul Carrack
- 1987 – "Angel Eyes (Home and Away)" by Wet Wet Wet (an entire verse of this song used an extended lyrical passage from the Squeeze song "Heartbreaking World", copied word-for-word; Difford and his publisher threatened legal action, and Difford was granted co-author credit)
- 2005 – "If I Hadn't Got You" by Chris Braide

== Instruments ==
When Difford first started performing live, he used a Gibson Melody Maker, but moved to Fender Telecaster in 1979, and has "been on them since". More recently, he has used a custom Telecaster with a violin body, designed by Danny Ferrington.

== Solo discography ==
Year	Title	Chart positions	Notes
Year	Title	UK Independent	Notes
2002	I Didn't Get Where I Am		
2006	South East Side Story		
2008	The Last Temptation of Chris	#26	
2011	Cashmere if You Can		
2016	Fancy Pants		with Boo Hewerdine
2017	Let's Be Combe Avenue		
2017	Chris To... The Mill		Compilation album
2018	Pants		
2025	50 Years		
