= How the West Was Won (Peter Perrett album) =

Studio album by Peter Perrett
- Released: 30 June 2017
- Studio: Konk Studios; Eastcote Studios
- Genre: Indie rock
- Length: 42:56
- Label: Domino
- Producer: Chris Kimsey; Peter Perrett; Jamie Perrett

Peter Perrett chronology
How the West Was Won (2017)	Humanworld (2019)

Professional ratings
Review scores
Source	Rating
AllMusic	4/5 stars
The Guardian	4/5 stars

How the West Was Won is the debut solo studio album by the English rock musician Peter Perrett, released on 30 June 2017 by Domino. It was mainly produced by Chris Kimsey with Peter Perrett and his son Jamie producing the title track. Two music videos were produced for the album: "How the West Was Won" and "An Epic Story".

== Track listing ==
All tracks are written by Peter Perrett, except where noted.

Side one
No.	Title	Writer(s)	Length
1.	"How the West Was Won"		4:36
2.	"An Epic Story"		3:24
3.	"Hard to Say No"		3:28
4.	"Troika"		3:43
5.	"Living in My Head"	Jamie Perrett; Peter Perrett	6:34

Side two
No.	Title	Length
6.	"Man of Extremes"	2:45
7.	"Sweet Endeavour"	3:27
8.	"C Voyeurger"	5:48
9.	"Something in My Brain"	4:53
10.	"Take Me Home"	4:23
