= Koulla Kakoulli =

British musician, dominatrix and bodybuilder (1961–2018)

- Born: September 1961; Forest Hill, London, England
- Died: 2 or 3 August 2018 (aged 56); Brighton, England
- Occupations: Musician; dominatrix; bodybuilder

Koulla Kakoulli (Greek: Κούλα Κακουλλή) (September 1961 – 2 or 3 August 2018) was an English musician, dominatrix known as Mistress Dometria, and international competitive bodybuilder. Her work was the subject of the feature-length documentary The Boss Lady.

== Background ==
Kakoulli was born in September 1961 in Forest Hill, London, England.

As a musician, Kakoulli sang and played keyboards and guitar. She was a backing musician for solo artist Johnny Thunders and the rock band The Only Ones, featuring on The Only Ones albums The Only Ones (1978), Even Serpents Shine (1979) and Baby's Got a Gun (1980). She also fronted her own band Lonesome No More. Her sister Zena Kakoulli was married to the musician and record producer Peter Perrett and managed both bands. Her brother, Harri Kakoulli, later became the bassist of the rock band Squeeze.

Kakoulli competed in the International Bodybuilding and Fitness Association Ms. Universe Over 50 division, taking third place in the 2018 championships, and fourth place in the 2017 championship.

As a dominatrix, Kakoulli used the name Mistress Dometria, and operated the Brighton Dungeon, a BDSM studio. Her work was the subject of The Boss Lady, a feature-length documentary by Stephanie De Palma.

Kakoulli was a mother of five, and had four grandchildren. At the time of her death, she was mourning the death of the father of three of her children.

Kakoulli was found dead in the Brighton Dungeon on 3 August 2018, at the age of 56. Although traces of multiple class A drugs were found in her system, an inquest reached an open verdict. At the inquest into her death, the coroner described her thus: "Of the many people I've met, Koulla was one of the most amazing. Leading her life as she wanted to. Extraordinarily well organised with a huge number of people who loved her."

After Kakoulli's death, a minute's silence was held at the Kent Classic bodybuilding competition in August 2018.
