= Gilson Lavis =

English drummer and artist (1951–2025)

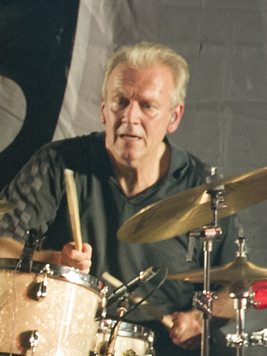
- Lavis in 2013

Background information
- Born: David Leslie Gilson Lavis; 27 June 1951; Bedford, Bedfordshire, England
- Died: 5 November 2025 (aged 74) Pinchbeck, Lincolnshire, England
- Genres: New wave; power pop
- Occupation: Musician
- Instrument: Drums
- Years active: 1976–2024
- Formerly of: Squeeze; Jools Holland and his Rhythm & Blues Orchestra

David Leslie Gilson Lavis (/ˈɡɪlsən ˈleɪvɪs/ GHIL-sən LAY-vis, 27 June 1951 – 5 November 2025) was an English drummer and portrait artist. He gained fame as drummer with the band Squeeze in the 1970s and 1980s. Lavis was for more than 30 years drummer for Jools Holland and his Rhythm & Blues Orchestra, with former Squeeze bandmate Jools Holland, before retiring from drumming in 2024. Rod Stewart described him as "the best swing drummer since Charlie Watts ... the guv'nor of swing".

== Early life ==
David Leslie Gilson Lavis was born in Bedford, England, on 27 June 1951, the son of the manager of a local building firm. While in school Lavis wanted to be a part of a Beat band. He began playing drums when he was 13 as there were already 16 guitarists in his school band and no drummer. His parents bought him a basic drum kit and he started playing local gigs. He ran away from home when he was 15 to join a Scottish band in Glasgow called Bo-Weevil, and as they already had a David in the band he began using one of his middle names. He was briefly the drummer in the band Teargas, the forerunner of the sensational alexharveyband. Lavis became homesick and six months later was back in Bedford, where he formed the band Headline News, which toured military bases in West Germany. In the early seventies he was Chuck Berry's tour drummer.

== Career ==
Lavis was an accomplished session musician before joining Squeeze. Early in his career he had worked at the Talk of the Town in London as a pick-up drummer for musicians from America. He toured with and performed for widely recognized musicians throughout his career and one of his more memorable jobs, as he recounted in 2025, was touring with Chuck Berry.

By 1974, times had become hard, and he was forced to sell his drums. He found work stacking bricks as they came out of a kiln and his hands "became calloused and scarred". He acquired a new drum kit, auditioned in London, and joined Squeeze in 1976 after responding to an advertisement in Melody Maker. Lavis "proved to be the perfect drummer for the group's sophisticated, tightly structured songs", but by 1982, before the band's initial break up, he was drinking excessively. Squeeze broke up in 1982, at which time Lavis was reported to have been drinking heavily and "was becoming increasingly dysfunctional". He enrolled with Alcoholics Anonymous, vowed never to play the drums again and became a cab driver. Although he did drive a cab for a few years, he also did play drums for Graham Parker on his 1983 LP The Real Macaw, and for Jools Holland on his 1984 EP Jools Holland Meets Rock-A-Boogie Billy.

In 1985, Lavis received an invitation from Glenn Tilbrook to play with a reformed Squeeze in a one-off charity show. This led to another seven years playing with Squeeze after the band decided to get back together full-time. Lavis recorded four more albums with Squeeze before being dismissed from the group after an American tour in 1992. He said later that he had just separated from his first wife and had thought that "having a drink would be a good idea". His relapse into drinking led to continuing dysfunction and unreliability. Lavis moved to Lincolnshire and bought a derelict cottage, intending to "get out of the business, live in the country and give drum lessons". He also worked on remaining sober.

He was contacted by former Squeeze bandmate Jools Holland, who had employed Lavis on his solo albums of the 1980s, and invited him to play a gig. Lavis "said he would rather not, but his arm was twisted". The two started out as a musical duo in the mid-1980s, and in 1987 the Jools Holland Big Band was formed which included Lavis. This line-up eventually became Jools Holland and his Rhythm & Blues Orchestra. After 30 years of touring with Holland, Lavis retired from the music business in November 2024.

Lavis was also a portrait artist. He specialised in black and white acrylic portraits and painted numerous fellow musicians, including Eric Clapton, Amy Winehouse, Paul McCartney and The Rolling Stones, with his work being displayed at exhibitions in London and New York. He had cited Marvel Comics as an inspiration for his style.

== Discography ==
=== Studio albums with Squeeze ===
- Squeeze (1978)
- Cool for Cats (1979)
- Argybargy (1980)
- East Side Story (1981)
- Sweets from a Stranger (1982)
- Cosi Fan Tutti Frutti (1985)
- Babylon and On (1987)
- Frank (1989)
- Play (1991)

== Personal life and death ==
Lavis was active through Alcoholics Anonymous (AA) after becoming sober and he supported others through the process.

Lavis was married secondly, for 35 years, to Nicky, who was working as Jools Holland's personal assistant when they met. They had one son.

Lavis died at his home in Pinchbeck, Lincolnshire, on 5 November 2025, at the age of 74.

His death was announced on social media by Jools Holland, who described Lavis as a "dear friend" while also highlighting his support work with the "AA fellowship." Among others who paid tribute to him was singer Gregory Porter, who said Lavis was "a beautiful man and soulful performer."
