= Mike Kellie =

English rock drummer (1947–2017)

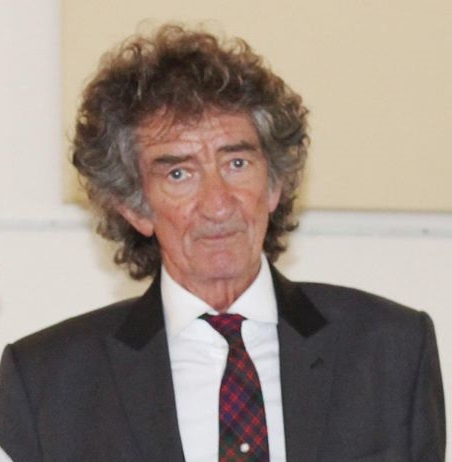
- Kellie in 2015

Background information
- Born: Michael Alexander Kellie; 24 March 1947; Birmingham, England
- Died: 18 January 2017 (aged 69)
- Occupations: Musician; composer; record producer
- Instruments: Drums; percussion; vocals
- Years active: 1966–1985; 1999–2017
- Formerly of: Locomotive; The V.I.P.'s; Spooky Tooth; The Only Ones
- Website: mikekellie.com

Michael Alexander Kellie (24 March 1947 – 18 January 2017) was an English musician, composer and record producer.

During a career spanning more than 50 years, Kellie was a member of the rock bands the V.I.P.s, Spooky Tooth, and the Only Ones. As a session musician, he contributed to the film soundtrack of The Who's Tommy and worked with various artists, including George Harrison, Joe Cocker, Traffic, Jerry Lee Lewis, and Peter Frampton. His additional credits as a collaborator include recordings with Maurice Gibb, Gary Wright, Johnny Thunders, Luther Grosvenor, and Neil Innes, among others

In 2014, Kellie released his debut solo album Music from The Hidden, while still a member of the Only Ones. He died on 18 January 2017, following a short illness.

== Early career ==
Kellie was born in Birmingham, England, into a non-musical family. As a child, he showed an early interest in rhythm, practising on a coal scuttle with hearth brushes to simulate a snare drum. In his teen years, he joined St. Michaels Youth Club band as a drummer. He later played at "The Track" at Tudor Grange Sports Centre in Solihull. On the basis of this work, he was invited by Brian "Monk" Ffinch to play with Wayne and the Beachcombers in Birmingham, which started his career as a professional musician.

In 1966, Kellie played in Birmingham in a band called the Locomotive with Chris Wood of Traffic, and later with the V.I.P.'s (later Art) in Carlisle.

Manager Chris Blackwell found a singer and organist from New Jersey named Gary Wright, added him to the line-up of Art and launched the band Spooky Tooth, with Kellie, Greg Ridley, Luther Grosvenor and Mike Harrison. They recorded four albums before the members left to join other bands or release solo projects.

After the initial decline of Spooky Tooth, Kellie joined Johnny Hallyday's band for a summer tour of France in 1974, before forming The Only Ones in 1976 with Peter Perrett, Alan Mair and John Perry. The Only Ones, best known for the single "Another Girl, Another Planet", recorded three albums for CBS, although over time, their catalogue has contained many compilations and other releases, which now outnumber their studio albums.

In February 1978, Johnny Thunders moved to London with his family, and began playing with a loose revue dubbed the Living Dead. Kellie became part of this floating line-up (that also included Perrett along with Sex Pistols Steve Jones and Paul Cook) and recorded Thunders' So Alone album, which featured his signature song "You Can't Put Your Arms Around a Memory".

Following the Only Ones' farewell in 1981 at London's Lyceum, Kellie moved to the countryside north of Toronto, Canada, where he spent four years away from performing. He used this time to learn the piano and write songs.

== Break from music and later career ==
Returning to Britain in 1985, Kellie spent several years hill farming in North Wales and Scotland where he became a shepherd. In 1999 Kellie reunited with Mike Harrison, Luther Grosvenor and Greg Ridley under the Spooky Tooth moniker. Together they released the Cross Purpose album.

In 2004, Kellie reunited with Mike Harrison and Gary Wright to play dates in Germany as a new incarnation of Spooky Tooth. The band later released the DVD Nomad Poets with live performances from Worpswede and Hamburg, Germany.

In 2007, the Only Ones reformed, touring the UK, Europe and Japan as well as performing on BBC TV's Later... with Jools Holland.

In 2010, with the Only Ones undergoing another sabbatical, Kellie began recording his own collection of music which become his first solo album. Entitled Music from The Hidden, the album was produced by Kellie who also played drums, organ, bass and acoustic guitars, percussion and sang lead vocals. There are also contributions from Gordon Jackson (acoustic guitar), Finley Barker and Tony Kelsey (guitars), Steve Winwood (organ, mandolin and bass), Bill Hunt, Levi French and Tony Ariss (pianos), Rob Harrison (bass) Steve Gibbons (backing vocals) and Greg Platt Lake (guitar and vocals).

Kellie was prominent among the musicians featured on the six-CD Jess Roden Anthology, presented by Hidden Masters.

He contributed to the 2011 sessions for the Distractions re-union album, The End of the Pier, which was released on Occultation Records in 2012.

== Discography ==
Studio album

- Music from The Hidden (2014)
