= The Only Ones =

English rock band

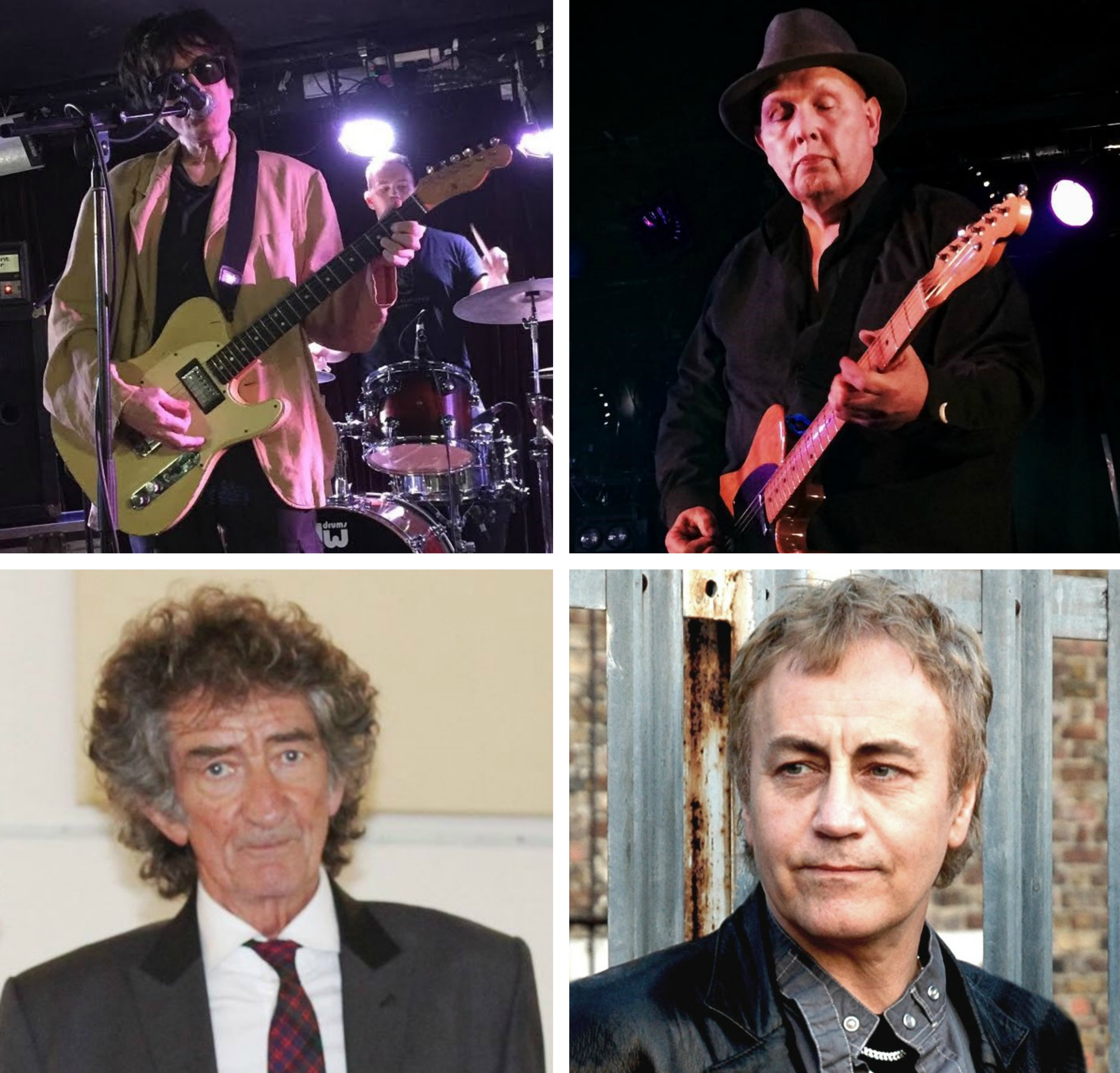
- Classic lineup of the Only Ones. Clockwise, from top left: Peter Perrett (vocals), John Perry (guitar), Alan Mair (bass), Mike Kellie (drums)

Background information
- Origin: London, England
- Genres: Power pop; new wave; punk rock; indie rock
- Years active: 1976–1982; 2007–2017; 2023–present
- Labels: Vengeance; CBS; Epic
- Spinoffs: The One; The Living Dead
- Spinoff of: England's Glory; Spooky Tooth; The Beatstalkers
- Members: Peter Perrett; Alan Mair; John Perry
- Past members: Mike Kellie

The Only Ones are an English rock band formed in London in 1976, whose original band members are Peter Perrett, Alan Mair, John Perry and Mike Kellie, they first disbanded in 1982. They were associated with punk rock, yet straddled the musical territory amidst punk, power pop and hard rock, with noticeable influences from psychedelia.

The Only Ones reformed in 2007 after their biggest hit "Another Girl, Another Planet" experienced a resurgence of public interest. The band completed a comeback UK tour in June 2007, and continued touring throughout 2008 and 2009. New material was recorded in 2009 and played live, but was never released. In 2023, they reformed for the first time in nine years to play concerts in London, and Hebden Bridge.

== History ==
The Only Ones were originally formed in August 1976 in South London by Peter Perrett. Perrett had been recording demos since 1972, and in late 1975 he was looking for a bassist. He was introduced to John Perry as a possible candidate, but Perry wanted to concentrate on playing guitar instead. By August 1976, Perry and Perrett had found drummer Mike Kellie, formerly of Spooky Tooth, and bassist Alan Mair, who previously had huge success with the Scottish beat band the Beatstalkers. Their first single, "Lovers of Today", self-released on the Vengeance record label, was immediately made "record of the week" by three of the four main music papers. A year later they signed a recording contract with CBS. Their next single "Another Girl, Another Planet" became a popular and influential song, and remains the band's best-known song. It is often featured on various musical box-sets featuring a punk rock or new wave theme. After its inclusion on the compilation album The Sound of the Suburbs (1991), it was re-released as a single and reached no. 57 in the UK Singles Chart.

The Only Ones released their eponymous debut studio album The Only Ones in April 1978, produced by the band themselves, with the assistance of Robert Ash. It was well received by both reviewers and fans, albeit it is their lowest charting album, peaking at No. 56 on the UK Albums Chart. Steve Lillywhite who had started his career the year before the album was released, was credited for various engineering on the album. Lillywhite would later go on to become a Grammy Award-winning record producer. Mick Gallagher, known for his work with Ian Dury and the Blockheads, provided keyboards on the album.

The band's follow-up studio album, Even Serpents Shine, was released the following year in March 1979, and was produced by Perrett and Mair. It features John "Rabbit" Bundrick on keyboards, who is best known for his work with the Who. The album charted higher than their debut but was still not a Top 40 hit however, peaking just outside at No. 42 in the UK.

In 1980, they released their third and final studio album, Baby's Got a Gun, which was produced by Colin Thurston, best known for his work with Duran Duran, Talk Talk, the Human League, Kajagoogoo, and Bow Wow Wow.

Guesting on the album would be Penetration's lead vocalist Pauline Murray, who sang a duet with Peter Perrett on the Johnny Duncan cover song "Fools", and also provided backing vocals for "Me and My Shadow". The studio album marked the only time that the band had released a cover version with the aforementioned "Fools", which was later released as a single, and Baby's Got a Gun also marked the only time that a guitarist other than the band members Perrett and Perry had been credited, with Barrie Evans providing rhythm guitar, in addition to playing percussion. Koulla Kakoulli who had sung backing vocals on the band's first two studio albums also returns, making her the only unofficial member of the band to be on all of their studio albums.

Baby's Got a Gun peaked at No. 37 on the UK Albums Chart, becoming their best selling studio album.

In the summer of 1980, they were the opening act for the Who on their tour of the United States, and in 1982 the band officially disbanded.

In June 1984, the rarities compilation album Remains was released by Closer Records. The collection combines pre-Only Ones recordings from November 1975 with Only Ones demos, many from August 1976. The 1975 titles — "Watch You Drown", "My Rejection", "Don't Hold Your Breath" and "I Only Wanna Be Your Friend" — also feature the contributions of Squeeze's Glenn Tilbrook, Gordon Edwards, drummer Alan Platt, and John Perry playing bass guitar. These demos pre-date the recording of the first Only Ones single, "Lovers of Today". Subsequent tracks all feature the regular Only Ones line-up.

In subsequent years, the Only Ones retained a following and their posthumously released records – live performances, BBC Television and radio shows, and compilation albums – now outnumber their studio albums. Unusually, the Only Ones' discs were never deleted from the CBS catalogue and remain in-print.

== Reunions ==
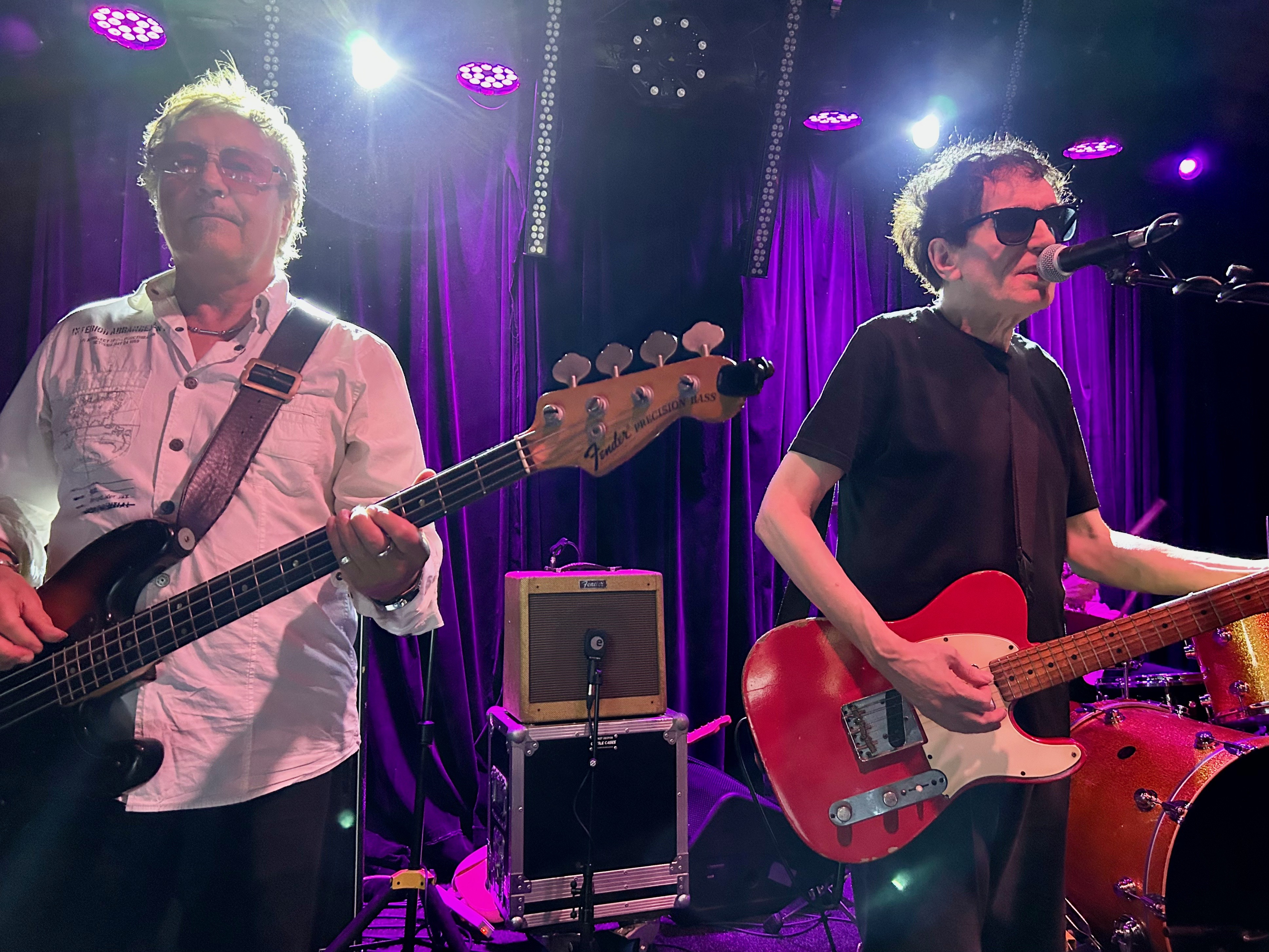
The Only Ones performing at the Trades Club in Hebden Bridge, 2023, left to right: Alan Mair (bass guitar), and Peter Perrett (vocals)

In an interview published in the 10 November 2006 issue of the tabloid newspaper, the Daily Record, Alan Mair commented that he was set to reform the Only Ones after "Another Girl, Another Planet" was used in a Vodafone ad campaign in 2006, and picked up as the introduction theme to Irish DJ Dave Fanning's radio show. On 21 February 2007, Perry confirmed via his MySpace page that the band would reform for a five-date UK tour in June. Besides these dates, they played a number of festivals, debuting at All Tomorrow's Parties festival in Minehead, England, on 27 April. During the summer, they also played at the two-part Wireless Festival in Hyde Park, London, Harewood House, (near Leeds), and the Connect Music Festival at Inveraray Castle in Scotland on 1 September.

News of the tour prompted coverage in several UK national newspapers and the dates were met with positive reviews. During these gigs, the band played a new song called "Dreamt She Could Fly".

The press also reported that three of the band were keen to record a new studio album following the tour, but that Perrett seemed hesitant. In April 2008, the band were seen on Later... with Jools Holland performing their song, "Another Girl, Another Planet", and a new song entitled "Black Operations". The band also played other new songs including "Is This How Much You Care" and "Magic Tablet" live on a Canal+ TV special in Paris and an acoustic/unplugged session for Radio 6 Queens of Noize. A live DVD of the Shepherd's Bush Empire show was released in March 2008. Other rumoured releases included DVDs from a show on the band's last US tour, and a re-release of Faster Than Lightning, which was released on VHS in 1991 and on DVD in 2012.

All three CBS studio albums, remastered by Alan Mair, were re-released with bonus tracks in February 2009. "Another Girl, Another Planet" was used in the film D.E.B.S. (2004), as well as in the 2010 hit film Paul. Sony BMG announced a January 2012 release date for an Only Ones box set in the "Original Album Classics" series. The set comprised all three of their studio albums remastered, plus various B-sides and out-takes. The Only Ones topped the bill at the 2012 Rebellion Festival in Blackpool on 4 August of that year.

In late 2014, the Only Ones (minus Mike Kellie) played some gigs in Tokyo, co-headlining with the Flamin' Groovies. In August 2014, Perrett began playing solo shows (Felipop Festival, Spain) using his sons' band Strangefruit, followed by more dates in 2015 (Hebden Bridge, Bristol, London etc.) with the same formation.

The band ceased activity after the death of drummer Mike Kellie, but Perrett, Mair and Perry reunited to play a three-song set in the summer of 2019. The band officially reformed as the Only Ones to perform at the Rebellion Festival in Blackpool in August 2023, after playing gigs in London, and Hebden Bridge.

== Influence ==
Perrett and Kellie were noticed by Johnny Thunders, founding member of the New York Dolls and the Heartbreakers, and worked as sidemen on Thunders' debut solo studio album, So Alone, notably appearing together on the classic "You Can't Put Your Arms Around a Memory". However, drug addiction, particularly heroin use, derailed their career, and Perrett had only sporadically been heard from since the band broke up in 1982. He briefly resurfaced in the mid 1990s with the studio album, Woke Up Sticky, and released his debut solo studio album, How the West Was Won in 2017.

Lead guitarist Perry went on to play as a session guitarist for artists including the Sisters of Mercy, Evan Dando and Marianne Faithfull. More recently, he has written several well received music biographies on the Who's seminal hits compilation Meaty Beaty Big and Bouncy, the Rolling Stones' double album Exile on Main Street and in 2004, Jimi Hendrix's Electric Ladyland. During 2005–2006, he played and recorded with singer-songwriter Freddie Stevenson.

The Only Ones have been influential on the indie rock and alternative rock scenes ever since their initial success, on bands such as the Replacements, Blur, Nirvana, and more recently the Libertines. Several bands have covered their song "Another Girl, Another Planet", including the Libertines (at London Forum with Perrett guesting), The Replacements and Blink-182. Their song "The Whole of the Law" was covered by Yo La Tengo on their sixth studio album, Painful (1993).

== Discography ==
Studio albums

- The Only Ones (1978)
- Even Serpents Shine (1979)
- Baby's Got a Gun (1980)
