= John Perry (musician) =

English musician, songwriter, and author

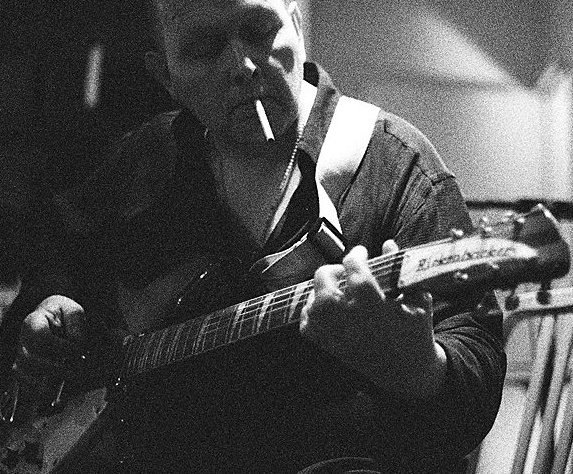
- John Perry recording in Cambridge, Mass.

Background information
- Born: John M. Perry; 4 June 1952 (age 74); Bristol, England
- Genres: Rock; new wave; post-punk
- Occupations: Musician; author; composer
- Instruments: Guitar; piano; bass guitar
- Years active: 1971–present
- Labels: CBS; Epic; Sony

John M. Perry is an English musician, songwriter, and author. He came to prominence in the mid-1970s as the guitarist for the English rock band the Only Ones.

The Only Ones came out of London during the first wave of punk (1976–77). Their songs have been covered by groups such as Blink 182, Belle and Sebastian, and the Libertines.

Perry's guitar style is noted for a combination of attack and melody, a mixture that the UK music magazine Sounds described as being "very superb".

== Music career ==
John Perry was born in Bristol, England, and began to play the guitar at the age of 12. In his early teens he played roles in BBC Radio Drama and for the Bristol Old Vic Theatre School. Well paid - in those days the BBC still paid in guineas - and a Beach Boys fan, he was torn between buying a surfboard or a guitar. He chose the latter and started his music career with local bands in Bristol. At 19 he joined a loose bunch of musicians centred on the Pink Fairies, Hawkwind and other UK Underground bands. After appearing at the 1971 Glastonbury Festival (the first with the pyramid stage), he played in a series of British and European tours and festivals in Pilton, Oxford, Trentishoe, Holland etc. His bands include the Ratbites from Hell (pre-Only Ones) and Decline and Fall (post-Only Ones). He has also worked with Johnny Thunders, Marianne Faithfull, Grateful Dead lyricist Robert Hunter, Alejandro Escovedo, the Sisters of Mercy, Mick Green (of The Pirates), Robert Palmer, Evan Dando of The Lemonheads, Martin Stephenson and the Daintees, Wayne Kramer, Screaming Lord Sutch, James Williamson, Nick Kent & The Subterraneans, Michael Nyman, JC Carroll, The Members, Freddie Stevenson, Heidi Berry, and Jayne County. He acted as musical director on the Johnny Thunders and Patti Palladin album Copycats.

In late 1975, Perry hooked up with Peter Perrett, recording demos in South London. Over the next twelve months this collaboration evolved into the band the Only Ones. After a self-produced single, "Lovers of Today/Peter and the Pets," the Only Ones signed a recording contract with CBS in January 1978. The band also received offers from Sire, Anchor and Island. According to reliable sources Island owner Chris Blackwell made several impassioned pleas to the band, culminating in a helicopter dash to a Midlands gig where he made a final appeal for the band sign to Island.

The band's first major label single, "Another Girl, Another Planet," appeared on CBS to immediate and almost universal critical acclaim but crawled no higher than the lower reaches of the Top 60, achieving only #56 UK. Despite frequent re-releases over three decades in various formats, sizes, and coloured vinyls the record never became a chart hit, even after frequent appearances in films and in a major European TV and cinema advertising campaign for Vodafone. The single appears in several critical volumes such as Paul Williams' Rock and Roll: The 100 Best Singles but has remained a "turntable hit". Working with producer Colin Thurston, the band later achieved a top forty album with Baby's Got a Gun (#37 UK).

Between 1976 and 1980, the band recorded three studio LPs for CBS Records (Epic Records in the US) and also made sufficient appearances on BBC Radio and TV to release two albums: The John Peel Sessions and a double CD, Darkness & Light: The Complete BBC Recordings. John Perry cites The Peel Sessions as his favourite of all the bands' releases. "We were a great live band and the Peel recordings represent that. In bigger studios some band-members went overboard, filling all 48 tracks 'because they were there'; the Peel Sessions were live performances recorded on 8 track. Four songs in an afternoon. Less piddling around." The Only Ones split in 1980 during an eventful US tour supporting the Who, which saw the arrests of several band members in separate events in California.

In late February 2007, the Only Ones reformed, appearing at All Tomorrow's Parties and a sold-out show at the Shepherd's Bush Empire. That summer they played huge outdoor festivals; they were second on the bill in London's Hyde Park to The White Stripes, and appeared at Harewood House in Yorkshire, and Inveraray Castle in Scotland where they played with Big Star, Primal Scream, Johnny Marr and many others.

Between 2008 and 2010 they played France, Spain, Holland, Norway, Sweden and twice in Japan. They returned to play Japan for a third time in November 2014. Despite packed concerts and great reviews, sources close to the band confirmed that the new songs heard in concert were not scheduled for release. These 2014 shows in Tokyo mark the band's final appearance.

Perry, who played lead guitar on the Lemonheads' album Varshons, joined Evan Dando onstage at the Ben & Jerry's Summer Sundae festival at Clapham Common, London on 27 July 2008.

More recently, Perry has played live and recorded with Martin Stephenson and the Daintees, The Members frontman JC Carroll, Mark Keds' East London band Deadcuts, and Texan singer Alejandro Escovedo. Perry and Perrett appear on Alejandro Escovedo's album The Crossing and, in January 2019, Perry joined guests Wayne Kramer (MC5), James Williamson (Stooges), and Joe Ely for the tour's opening night at The Paramount in Austin, Texas.

== Books ==
Perry has written three books of musicology. First Meaty Beaty Big and Bouncy on the Who's classic singles; and second an account of the making of The Rolling Stones' double album Exile on Main St. His third book, on Jimi Hendrix's Electric Ladyland, was one of the earliest titles commissioned for the 33⅓ series of music books. John's books have been translated into Spanish, Portuguese and Chinese language editions.

He contributed an article on the influential acoustic guitarist Bert Jansch to a collection of 33.3 authors published in 2019 by Bloomsbury.

- The Who: Meaty Beaty Big and Bouncy (1998), ISBN 978-0028647739
- The Rolling Stones: Exile on Main Street (22 December 2000), ISBN 978-0825671807
- Jimi Hendrix's Electric Ladyland (33⅓) (31 March 2004), ISBN 978-0826415714
- The 33⅓ B-sides (33⅓) (5 September 2019). ISBN 978-1501342943
