= Peter Perrett =

English singer, songwriter, musician and record producer (born 1952)

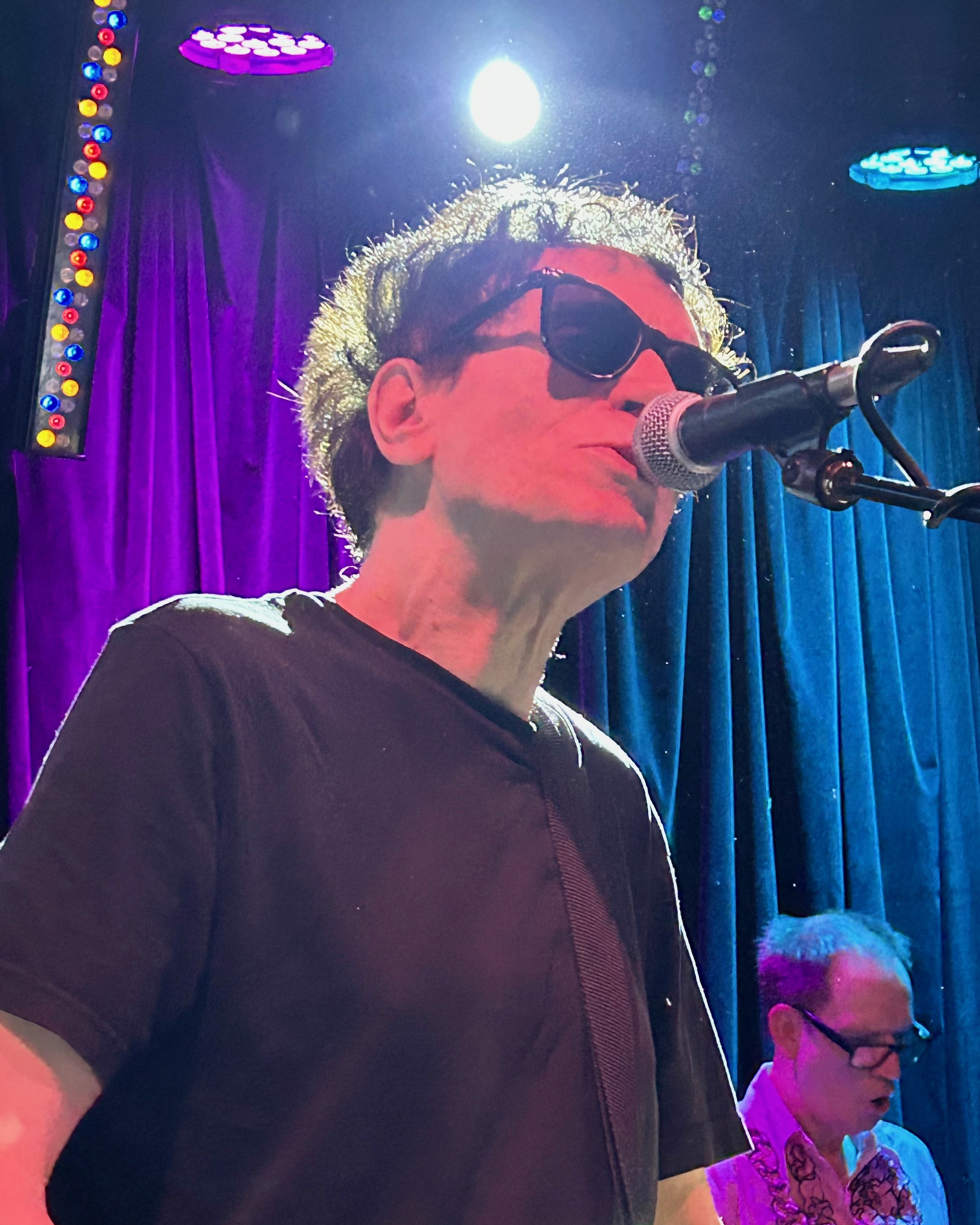
- Perrett performing with the Only Ones at the Trades Club in Hebden Bridge, 2023

Background information
- Born: Peter Albert Neil Perrett; 8 April 1952 (age 74); Camberwell, South London, England
- Genres: Power pop; new wave; punk rock; indie rock
- Occupations: Singer; songwriter; musician; record producer
- Instruments: Vocals; guitar
- Labels: Demon; Dwarf; Domino
- Member of: The Only Ones
- Formerly of: England's Glory; The One; The Living Dead
- Website: peterperrett.com

Peter Albert Neil Perrett (born 8 April 1952) is an English singer, songwriter, musician and record producer. He is the lead vocalist, rhythm guitarist and principal songwriter for the rock band the Only Ones.

Prior to forming the Only Ones, who were initially active between 1976 and 1982, Perrett formed England's Glory, whose recordings were finally released in 1987. Following the break-up of the Only Ones, Perrett retreated from public life before forming the One in 1994. The Only Ones reformed in 2007, and Perrett released his debut solo studio album, How the West Was Won, in 2017. Humanworld, his second solo studio album, was released on 7 June 2019. His third studio album, The Cleansing, was released in 2024.

== Early years ==
Peter Albert Neil Perrett was born on 8 April 1952 in Camberwell, south London. Perrett's father was first a police officer in post-war Palestine and then a builder, and his mother was an Austrian Jew. Perrett boarded at Bancroft's School, from which he was expelled at the age of 15 for rebellious behaviour. He was again expelled from his next school, Haberdashers' Aske's Hatcham College, at age 16. He left home after that and learned how to support himself within the London drug scene.

Prior to forming the Only Ones, Perrett had recorded material with England's Glory in 1973. At that time, his singing style was so similar to Lou Reed's that it nearly led NME journalist Nick Kent to believe that he was listening to unreleased Velvet Underground material. Although the band did not officially release any material at the time, an album of demos was released in 1987 due to interest in Perrett's next band, the Only Ones.

== Career ==
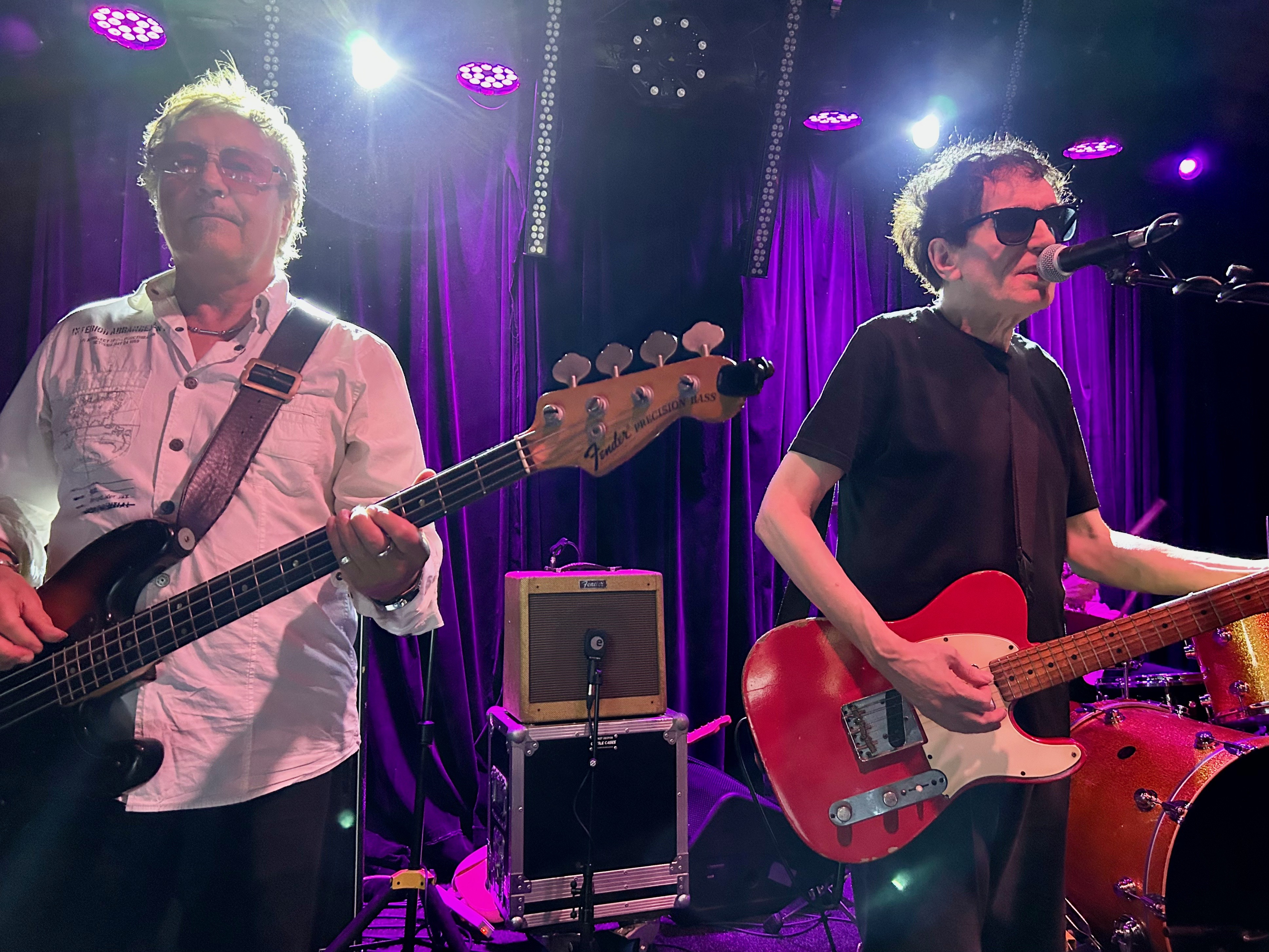
The Only Ones performing in 2023, left to right: Alan Mair (bass), and Perrett

Perrett formed the Only Ones in 1976 with his wife Zena as manager. After self-releasing their debut single, "Lovers of Today", the band signed a recording contract with CBS Records and released three studio albums: The Only Ones (1978), Even Serpents Shine (1979), and Baby's Got a Gun (1980), and were the opening act for the Who on their tour of the United States, before breaking up in 1982.

In 1993, Perrett was referenced by name in the song “Seein’ Her” by Paul Westerberg.

Perrett re-emerged in 1994 with a new band called the One. The band released their debut extended play (EP), Cultured Palate, via their manager's record label Dwarf Records, before signing to Demon Records and releasing their debut album, Woke Up Sticky, in 1996. The band split up that same year, with Perrett disappearing again until April 2004, when he made an appearance on stage with the Libertines. He also appeared on stage with his sons Jamie and Peter Jr.'s band Love Minus Zero. Long hiatuses in his music career have been ascribed to his enduring struggles with heroin and crack cocaine addictions.

The Only Ones reunited in 2007, following the use of "Another Girl, Another Planet" in a Vodafone advertising campaign and a subsequent request to perform at the All Tomorrow's Parties festival in Minehead. The band first played a brief UK tour in April and June of that year, and then continued performing as far afield as Japan through 2009. Despite reports that the band was working on a new album and performing new songs live, including "Dreamt She Could Fly" and "Black Operations" (which the band played on Later... with Jools Holland), the band went on hiatus again without releasing any new material.

After the Only Ones performed in Japan in 2014 without their drummer Mike Kellie, a press release announced that Perrett would play a one-off solo date at the Trades Club in Hebden Bridge, West Yorkshire in January 2015. Perrett played the gig to good reviews with his two sons performing as the backing band.

In April 2017, Perrett announced his debut solo studio album, How the West Was Won, which was released on 30 June by the Domino label. Also on Domino, a second solo studio album was released on 7 June 2019, titled Humanworld. The album was preceded by two official music videos, "Once Is Enough" and "I Want Your Dreams", in April 2019 and an audio-only track titled "Heavenly Day" in May of the same year.

The release of Humanworld was accompanied by a UK tour, which included a reunion of the three remaining members of the Only Ones when Perrett appeared at Somers Town Festival in July 2019.

In 2023, the Only Ones reformed for the first time in nine years to play the Rebellion Festival in Blackpool and shows at Hebden Bridge.

== Personal life ==
At age 16, Perrett ran away with his girlfriend, Xenoulla "Zena" Kakoulli (whose sister was Koulla Kakoulli). They married in 1970. Zena is a clothing designer and was manager of the Only Ones from 1977 to 1981. Both she and Perrett suffer from chronic obstructive pulmonary disease (COPD) as a result of drug abuse.

Perrett now lives in North London.

In August 2025, he was arrested in central London, for being part of a Palestine Action protest. Palestine Action are a proscribed terrorist group in the UK.

== Discography ==
Solo

- How the West Was Won (2017)
- Humanworld (2019)
- The Cleansing (2024)

The Only Ones

- The Only Ones (1978)
- Even Serpents Shine (1979)
- Baby's Got a Gun (1980)

The One

- Woke Up Sticky (1996)
