= Another Girl, Another Planet =

1978 new wave song by The Only Ones

Single by the Only Ones

from the album The Only Ones
- B-side: "Special View"
- Released: 1978
- Recorded: April 1978
- Studio: Escape Studios (Egerton, Kent); Basing Street Studios (London)
- Genre: New wave; power pop
- Length: 3:02
- Label: Columbia
- Songwriter: Peter Perrett
- Producers: The Only Ones; Robert Ash

The Only Ones singles chronology
"Lovers of Today" (1977)	"Another Girl, Another Planet" (1978)	"The Whole of the Law" (1978)

Official audio
- "Another Girl, Another Planet" on YouTube

"Another Girl, Another Planet" is a song by the English rock band the Only Ones. It is the second track on their debut studio album, The Only Ones, released in 1978. The song is the band's most successful and has since been covered by several other performers.

== Recording ==
It was recorded on a 16-track analogue Studer tape machine and an ex-Steve Marriott Helios mixing console at Escape Studios, a residential facility in Egerton, Kent, by engineer and producer John Burns, assisted by Ian Maidman, and later worked on and mixed at Basing Street Studios by Robert Ash.

== Chart performance ==
The track was not a chart hit upon its initial release in 1978. Its first chart appearance was 7 June 1981, at No. 44, for one week, on the New Zealand chart. It was re-released in the UK in January 1992, backed with "Pretty in Pink" by the Psychedelic Furs to promote the compilation album, Sound of the Suburbs, and appeared in the UK Singles Chart for two weeks, peaking at No. 57.

== Recognition ==
Andy Claps of AllMusic describes it as "Arguably, the greatest rock single ever recorded".

The song was placed at number 18 in John Peel's all-time Festive Fifty millennium edition. Playing it in 1980's Festive Fifty, he introduced it as an "artful little caprice". In March 2005, Q magazine placed the song at number 83 in its list of the 100 Greatest Guitar Tracks.

The song is widely believed to be about heroin. "A fantastic song with an amazing guitar line," enthused Tim Wheeler of Northern Irish rock band Ash. "It took me a long time to figure out that it's about drugs – not a girl from another planet – and that space travel is a metaphor for being high. It was Peter Perrett's heroin-heavy drawl that eventually gave it away". In an interview in 2015 Perrett declared that the song has been actually inspired by a girl and that it is not about heroin, nevertheless admitting that he always enjoyed "writing ambiguous lyrics that could be taken on two or three different levels".

== Blink-182 cover ==
"Another Girl Another Planet"

Promotional single by Blink-182

from the album Greatest Hits
- Released: October 31, 2005
- Recorded: Late 2004
- Studio: Larrabee Sound Studios (Los Angeles, California)
- Genre: Pop-punk
- Length: 2:42
- Label: Universal
- Songwriter: Peter Perrett
- Producers: Mark Hoppus; Tom DeLonge; Travis Barker

The American rock band Blink-182 recorded a cover version of this song for the opening track of Travis Barker's MTV reality show Meet the Barkers. It was later released in 2005 as the closing track on their Greatest Hits album.

Chart (2005)	Peak position
US Pop 100 (Billboard)	99
