= Squeeze discography =

- Studio albums: 16
- Extended plays: 1
- Live albums: 4
- Compilation albums: 14
- Singles: 48
- Music videos: 34

Squeeze are a British rock band active from 1974 to 1982, from 1985 to 1999, and from 2007 to the present date. Founded by Glenn Tilbrook (guitar, vocals), Chris Difford (guitar, vocals), Jools Holland (keyboards) and Paul Gunn (drums), the group have released 16 studio albums, 14 compilation albums, 4 live albums, 1 extended play, 48 singles and 34 music videos. All Squeeze's hits are written by Glenn Tilbrook and Chris Difford.

== Albums ==
=== Studio albums ===
Title	Album details	Peak chart positions							Certifications
Title	Album details	UK	AUS	CAN	NZ	SCO	SWE	US	Certifications
Squeeze	Released: March 1978; Label: A&M	—	—	—	—	—	—	—	
Cool for Cats	Released: 4 April 1979; Label: A&M	45	18	—	32	—	—	—	ARIA: Gold; BPI: Silver
Argybargy	Released: February 1980; Label: A&M	32	—	26	—	—	—	71	CAN: Gold
East Side Story	Released: 15 May 1981; Label: A&M	19	—	29	—	—	25	44	BPI: Silver
Sweets from a Stranger	Released: 30 April 1982; Label: A&M	20	—	26	—	—	23	32	
Cosi Fan Tutti Frutti	Released: 26 August 1985; Label: A&M	31	97	—	—	—	—	57	
Babylon and On	Released: 7 September 1987; Label: A&M	14	84	95	—	—	—	36	BPI: Silver
Frank	Released: 24 August 1989; Label: A&M	58	—	—	—	—	—	113	
Play	Released: July 1991; Label: Reprise	41	—	—	—	—	—	—	
Some Fantastic Place	Released: 14 September 1993; Label: A&M	26	—	—	—	—	—	182	
Ridiculous	Released: 13 November 1995; Label: A&M/Ark 21/I.R.S.	50	—	—	—	87	—	—	
Domino	Released: November 1998; Label: Quixotic	—	—	—	—	—	—	—	
Spot the Difference	Released: 3 August 2010; Label: XOXO	—	—	—	—	—	—	—	
Cradle to the Grave	Released: 2 October 2015; Label: Virgin EMI/Love	12	—	—	—	18	—	— (Note: Cradle to the Grave did not enter the Billboard 200, but it peaked at number 34 on the Billboard Top Rock Albums chart.)	
The Knowledge	Released: 13 October 2017; Label: Love	25	—	—	—	21	—	—	
Trixies	Released: 6 March 2026; Label: BMG/Love	15	—	—	—	3	—	—	

=== Live albums ===
Title	Album details	Peak chart positions			Certifications
Title	Album details	UK	CAN	US	Certifications
A Round and a Bout	Released: 1990; Label: I.R.S./Deptford Fun City	50	— (Note: A Round and a Bout did not enter the RPM Album Chart, but the accompanying video album peaked at number 10 on the RPM Long-Form Music Videos chart.)	163	
Live at the Royal Albert Hall	Released: 1997; Label: A&M	—	—	—	
Five Live: On Tour in America	Released: 2007; Label: Love	—	—	—	
Live at the Fillmore	Released: 2012; Label: Anchor & Hope	—	—	—	

=== Compilation albums ===
Title	Album details	Peak chart positions			Certifications
Title	Album details	UK	AUS	US	Certifications
Singles – 45's and Under	Released: 22 October 1982; Label: A&M	3	76	47	BPI: Platinum; RIAA: Platinum
Greatest Hits	Released: 11 May 1992; Label: A&M	6	—	—	BPI: Platinum
Piccadilly Collection	Released: 1996; Label: A&M	—	—	—	
Excess Moderation	Released: 1996; Label: A&M				
Big Squeeze: The Very Best of Squeeze	Released: 2002; Label: A&M	8	—	—	BPI: Gold
Essential Squeeze	Released: 2007; Label: Love	25	—	—	BPI: Silver

== Extended plays ==
Title	Album details	Peak chart positions	Certifications
Title	Album details	UK	Certifications
Packet of Three	Released: July 1977; Label: Deptford Fun City	—	
Food for Thought	Released: 4 November 2022; Label: Love Records	—	

== Singles ==
Title	Year	Peak chart positions								Certifications	Album
Title	Year	UK	AUS	CAN	IRE	NL	NZ	US	US Main. Rock	Certifications	Album
"Cat On A Wall" (Packet Of Three EP)	1977	—	—	—	—	—	—	—	—		Non-album single
"Take Me, I'm Yours"	1978	19	—	—	—	—	—	—	x		Squeeze
"Bang Bang"	1978	49	—	—	—	—	—	—	x		Squeeze
"Goodbye Girl"	1978	63	—	—	—	—	—	—	x		Cool for Cats
"Cool for Cats"	1979	2	5	—	8	33	11	—	x	BPI: Gold	Cool for Cats
"Up the Junction"	1979	2	—	—	3	—	—	—	x	BPI: Silver	Cool for Cats
"Slap And Tickle"	1979	24	—	—	—	—	—	—	x		Cool for Cats
"Christmas Day"	1979	—	—	—	—	—	—	—	x		Non-album single
"Another Nail In My Heart"	1980	17	—	56	10	—	—	—	x		Argybargy
"If I Didn't Love You"	1980	—	—	—	—	—	—	—	x		Argybargy
"Pulling Mussels (From The Shell)"	1980	44	—	—	—	—	—	—	x		Argybargy
"Farfisa Beat"	1980	—	—	—	—	—	—	—	x		Argybargy
"Is That Love"	1981	35	—	—	25	—	—	—	—		East Side Story
"Tempted"	1981	41	95	45	—	—	—	49	8		East Side Story
"Labelled with Love"	1981	4	—	—	2	46	—	—	—	BPI: Silver	East Side Story
"Messed Around"	1981	—	—	—	—	—	—	—	—		East Side Story
"Black Coffee in Bed"	1982	51	—	—	—	—	—	103	26		Sweets from a Stranger
"When the Hangover Strikes"	1982	—	—	—	—	—	—	—	—		Sweets from a Stranger
"I've Returned"	1982	—	—	—	—	—	—	—	—		Sweets from a Stranger
"Annie Get Your Gun"	1982	43	52	—	16	—	—	—	40		Singles – 45's and Under
"Last Time Forever"	1985	45	—	—	—	—	—	—	—		Cosi Fan Tutti Frutti
"No Place Like Home"	1985	83	—	—	—	—	—	—	—		Cosi Fan Tutti Frutti
"Hits of the Year"	1985	—	—	—	—	—	—	—	39		Cosi Fan Tutti Frutti
"Heartbreaking World"	1985	—	—	—	—	—	—	—	—		Cosi Fan Tutti Frutti
"By Your Side"	1985	—	—	—	—	—	—	—	—		Cosi Fan Tutti Frutti
"King George Street"	1986	—	—	—	—	—	—	—	—		Cosi Fan Tutti Frutti
"Hourglass"	1987	16	90	23	24	65	—	15	22		Babylon and On
"Trust Me to Open My Mouth"	1987	72	—	—	—	—	—	—	50		Babylon and On
"The Waiting Game"	1987	—	—	—	—	—	—	—	—		Babylon and On
"853-5937"	1988	91	—	50	—	—	—	32	37		Babylon and On
"Footprints"	1988	—	—	—	—	—	—	—	—		Babylon and On
"If It's Love"	1989	—	—	—	—	—	—	—	—		Frank
"Love Circles"	1990	—	—	—	—	—	—	—	—		Frank
"Annie Get Your Gun (Live)"	1990	—	—	—	—	—	—	—	—		A Round and a Bout
"Sunday Street"	1991	87	—	—	—	—	—	—	—		Play
"Satisfied"	1991	132	—	47	—	—	—	—	49		Play
"Crying in My Sleep"	1991	—	—	—	—	—	—	—	—		Play
"Cool for Cats" (UK re-issue)	1992	62	—	—	—	—	—	—	—		Non-album single
"Third Rail"	1993	39	—	—	—	—	—	—	—		Some Fantastic Place
"Everything in the World"	1993	—	—	—	—	—	—	—	—		Some Fantastic Place
"Some Fantastic Place"	1993	73	—	—	—	—	—	—	—		Some Fantastic Place
"Loving You Tonight"	1993	80	—	—	—	—	—	—	—		Some Fantastic Place
"It's Over"	1994	89	—	—	—	—	—	—	—		Some Fantastic Place
"This Summer"	1995	36	—	—	—	—	—	—	—		Ridiculous
"Electric Trains"	1995	44	—	—	—	—	—	—	—		Ridiculous
"Heaven Knows"	1996	27	—	—	—	—	—	—	—		Ridiculous
"This Summer (Remix)"	1996	32	—	—	—	—	—	—	—		Ridiculous
"Down in the Valley"	1998	—	—	—	—	—	—	—	—		Non-album single
"Happy Days"	2015	—	—	—	—	—	—	—	—		Cradle to the Grave
"Innocence in Paradise"	2017	—	—	—	—	—	—	—	—		The Knowledge
"Trixies" (Parts 1 & 2)	2025	—	—	—	—	—	—	—	—		Trixies
"—" denotes releases that failed to chart | "x" denotes that the chart did not exist at the time.

== Music videos ==
Year	Title	Director	Album
1978	"Take Me I'm Yours"		Squeeze
1979	"Cool for Cats" (Version 1)	Derek Burbridge	Cool for Cats
1979	"Cool for Cats" (Version 2)	Derek Burbridge	Cool for Cats
1979	"Up the Junction"	Derek Burbridge	Cool for Cats
1979	"Christmas Day"	Brian Grant	Non-album single
1980	"Another Nail in My Heart"	Derek Burbridge	Argybargy
1980	"Pulling Mussels from a Shell"		
1981	"Is That Love?"	Barney Bubbles & Chalkie Davis	East Side Story
1981	"Tempted" (Version 1)		East Side Story
1981	"Tempted" (Version 2)		East Side Story
1981	"Messed Around"		East Side Story
1982	"Black Coffee in Bed"	Steve Barron	Sweets from a Stranger
1982	"I've Returned"		Sweets from a Stranger
1985	"Last Time Forever"	Geoff Wonfor	Cosi Fan Tutti Frutti
1985	"Hits of the Year"		Cosi Fan Tutti Frutti
1987	"Hourglass"	Adrian Edmonson	Babylon and On
1987	"Trust Me to Open My Mouth"		Babylon and On
1988	"853-5937"	Adrian Edmonson	Babylon and On
1988	"Footprints"	Carlos Grasso	Babylon and On
1989	"If It’s Love"		Frank
1990	"Annie Get Your Gun (Live)"		A Round and a Bout
1991	"Sunday Street"	Enrique Badulescu	Play
1991	"Satisfied"		Play
1993	"Third Rail"		Some Fantastic Place
1993	"Everything in the World"		Some Fantastic Place
1993	"Some Fantastic Place"	Peter Orton	Some Fantastic Place
1993	"Loving You Tonight"		Some Fantastic Place
1995	"This Summer"	Lloyd Stanton	Ridiculous
1995	"Electric Trains"	Lloyd Stanton	Ridiculous
1996	"Heaven Knows"		Ridiculous
2015	"Happy Days"		Cradle to the Grave
2015	"Cradle to the Grave"		Cradle to the Grave
2015	"Nirvana"		Cradle to the Grave
2017	"Patchouli"		The Knowledge
