= Heaven Knows (Squeeze song) =

Single by Squeeze

from the album Ridiculous
- Released: 27 May 1996 (UK)
- Recorded: 1995
- Genre: Rock
- Length: 3:45
- Label: A&M
- Songwriter(s): Glenn Tilbrook; Chris Difford
- Producer(s): Squeeze; Peter Smith

Squeeze singles chronology
"Electric Trains" (1995)	"Heaven Knows" (1996)	"This Summer" (1996)

"Heaven Knows" is a song by Squeeze, released as the third single from their eleventh album, Ridiculous. The single version differs significantly from the original album mix, as most of Chris Difford's vocals have been erased and replaced by new vocals from Glenn Tilbrook. The single reached number 27 in the UK Singles Chart.

Three versions of the single were released, each with a different set of live B-sides. The live tracks are the same as those found on the Live at the Royal Albert Hall CD, released in 1997.

A third mix of "Heaven Knows", which was similar but not identical to the single mix, was featured prominently in the 1995 film Hackers. This unique mix was finally made available in 2020 on the 25th Anniversary Edition release of the CD soundtrack.

== Track listing ==
CD 1

1. "Heaven Knows" (3:45)
2. "Goodbye Girl (live)" (3:46)
3. "Labelled with Love (live)" (4:51)
4. "Is That Love (live)" (2:33)

CD 2

1. "Heaven Knows" (3:45)
2. "Tempted (live)" (4:27)
3. "Walk Away (live)" (4:45)
4. "Some Fantastic Place (live)" (5:32)

CD 3

1. "Heaven Knows" (3:45)
2. "Take Me I'm Yours (live)" (3:43)
3. "Annie Get Your Gun (live)" (4:04)
4. "Slap And Tickle (live)" (4:20)
