= Singles – 45's and Under =

Compilation album by Squeeze
- Released: 22 October 1982
- Recorded: 1977 – 1982
- Genre: New wave; power pop; post-punk
- Length: 44:02; 43:42 (US version)
- Label: A&M
- Producer: various

Squeeze chronology
Sweets from a Stranger (1982)	Singles – 45's and Under (1982)	Difford & Tilbrook (1984)

Singles from Singles – 45's and Under
- 1. "Annie Get Your Gun" Released: 8 October 1982

Singles – 45's and Under is a compilation album by Squeeze, released on the A&M Records label on 22 October 1982. The album consisted of all their singles from 1978 to 1982 in chronological order, with the exception of "Bang Bang", "Christmas Day" and "When the Hangover Strikes", and included a new song, "Annie Get Your Gun", which was released as a single ahead of the album. It was the band's biggest selling album, having been certified platinum in both the UK and the US.

The US version of the album substituted "If I Didn't Love You" for "Labelled with Love." The lyrics of 'Goodbye Girl' are changed for the US version. Wallet is changed to Billfold and Guernsey to Boston.

== Reception ==
Professional ratings
Review scores
Source	Rating
AllMusic	5/5 stars
Robert Christgau	A-

AllMusic gave the album five stars, and their reviewer Chris Woodstra praised the collection as proof that Squeeze were "a great singles act – among the finest of the era".

== Track listing ==
All tracks written and composed by Chris Difford and Glenn Tilbrook.

Side one

1. "Take Me I'm Yours" – 2:48
2. "Goodbye Girl" – 3:05
3. "Cool for Cats" – 3:12
4. "Up the Junction" – 3:08
5. "Slap and Tickle" – 4:16
6. "Another Nail in My Heart" – 2:57
7. "Pulling Mussels (from the Shell)" – 4:00

Side two

1. "Labelled with Love" – 4:32 / "If I Didn't Love You" (US) – 4:12
2. "Is That Love" – 2:31
3. "Tempted" – 4:00
4. "Black Coffee in Bed" – 6:11
5. "Annie Get Your Gun" – 3:22

== Charts ==
Chart (1982/83)	Peak position
Australia (Kent Music Report)	76
UK Albums (Official Charts)	3
US Billboard 200	47

== Certifications ==
Region	Certification	Certified units/sales
United Kingdom (BPI)	Platinum	300,000^{^}
United States (RIAA)	Platinum	1,000,000^{^}
^{^} Shipments figures based on certification alone.
