= Sweets from a Stranger =

Studio album by Squeeze
- Released: 30 April 1982
- Recorded: 1981–1982
- Studio: Ramport, London
- Genre: Pop rock; new wave; power pop; sophisti-pop
- Length: 46:24
- Label: A&M
- Producer: Squeeze; Phil McDonald

Squeeze chronology
East Side Story (1981)	Sweets from a Stranger (1982)	Singles – 45's and Under (1982)

Singles from Sweets from a Stranger
- 1. "Black Coffee in Bed" Released: 9 April 1982; 2. "When the Hangover Strikes" Released: July 1982; 3. "I've Returned" Released: 1982 (Netherlands only)

Sweets from a Stranger is the fifth studio album by the British new wave group Squeeze, released April 30, 1982 through A&M. The album peaked at number 20 in the UK Albums Chart. The band split up soon after a world tour for the record, and the two main songwriters went on to record 1984's Difford & Tilbrook. Squeeze reunited and released Cosi Fan Tutti Frutti in 1985. As with all Squeeze albums, Chris Difford wrote the words first and Glenn Tilbrook would write the music afterwards often editing Difford's material to create a streamlined narrative. Tilbrook would record a demo afterwards and play it for Difford.

== Background and recording ==
Sweets from a Stranger was recorded during a period of tumult for the band, with tensions exacerbated by the band's continued touring and the pressures on the Difford–Tilbrook songwriting team from being compared to Lennon–McCartney. Tilbrook explained, "The band was not in a happy place on the year from East Side Story to Sweets from a Stranger. There were some great songs on Sweets from a Stranger, but the band itself did not feel great; there was dark cloud above us. It was just hard work being on the road then, and it was an odd time. Really, when you're having that sort of success, no manager is going to say, 'You need to stop for a while.' And no one did, so we had to."

Paul Carrack had left the band to work on his solo career and work as a studio musician. He was replaced by Don Snow. Snow would later appear with Procol Harum and Tina Turner on their respective albums and tours. Snow would later change his name to Jonn Savannah.

Within a year after the release of this album, Squeeze broke up. Difford and Tilbrook carried on releasing an album under both of their names before reforming Squeeze with the band's original drummer Gilson Lavis and keyboardist Jools Holland. Keith Wilkinson who had toured with Difford and Tilbrook replaced John Bentley for the reunion album Cosi Fan Tutti Frutti.

In 1997, the CD was released in the UK with two bonus tracks, as part of the Six of One... box set. The set included the band's first six studio albums, each digitally remastered. These CDs were made available for individual purchase in 1998.

A 2008 reissue included the two 1997 bonus tracks, and added a further seven tracks.

== Music ==
Detailing the stylistic direction of Sweets from a Stranger, Stephen Thomas Erlewine opined that Squeeze "wound up largely ditching the pop classicism of East Side Story for a gangly new wave experimentalism". "I've Returned" has been likened to Bruce Springsteen in sound, while Erlewine detailed "Onto the Dance Floor" to be "wannabe Bowie".

== Reception ==
=== Critical reception ===
Professional ratings
Review scores
Source	Rating
AllMusic	2.5/5 stars
Robert Christgau	B+
Rolling Stone	4/5 stars

Billboard highlighted the contributions of Don Snow, saying that he "restores some of the quirky rhythms and electronic accents from the quintet's earliest records." AllMusic's Stephen Thomas Erlewine gave a mixed and predominantly critical summary of Sweets from a Stranger. Despite noting "connections" to the band's acclaimed East Side Story and speaking positively of songs including "I've Returned" and the "sublime" peak "Black Coffee in Bed", Erlewine wrote-off much of the effort as "new wave clatter".

=== Artist's reflection ===
In retrospect both composers were critical of the album stating feeling that the songwriting and the production weren't up to par compared to what they did before. The American edition of the album featured praise for Difford and Tilbrook songs which both felt created additional pressure to create a classic with every single song. Difford commented "You just write to please yourself first of all...if other people like it, that's a bonus."

== Track listing ==
All songs written by Chris Difford and Glenn Tilbrook.

Side one

1. "Out of Touch" – 3:50
2. "I Can't Hold On" – 3:34
3. "Points of View" – 4:12
4. "Stranger Than the Stranger on the Shore" – 3:19
5. "Onto the Dance Floor" – 3:37
6. "When the Hangover Strikes" – 4:29

Side two

1. "Black Coffee in Bed" – 6:12
2. "I've Returned" – 2:34
3. "Tongue Like a Knife" – 4:10
4. "His House Her Home" – 3:23
5. "The Very First Dance" – 3:17
6. "The Elephant Ride" – 3:22

Bonus tracks (1997 & 2008 reissues)

13. "I Can't Get Up Anymore" – 3:55
14. "When Love Goes to Sleep" – 3:44

Bonus tracks (2008 reissue only)

15. "Annie Get Your Gun" – 3:25
16. "I'm At Home Tonight" – 3:23
17. "Elephant Girl" – 3:38
18. "Spanish Guitar" – 2:46
19. "Tomorrow's World (His House Her Home)" (Glenn Tilbrook demo) – 3:09
20. "Whenever We Meet" (demo version) – 2:58
21. "Last Call For Love" – 3:28

== Personnel ==
Squeeze

- Chris Difford – rhythm guitars, backing vocals, lead vocals on "His House Her Home"
- Glenn Tilbrook – lead guitars, keyboards, lead and backing vocals
- Don Snow – keyboards, backing vocals
- John Bentley – bass guitar, backing vocals
- Gilson Lavis – drums

Additional personnel

- Del Newman – string arrangements
- Elvis Costello – backing vocals on "Black Coffee in Bed"
- Paul Young – backing vocals on "Black Coffee in Bed"

Production

- Squeeze – producers, cover design
- Phil McDonald – producer, engineer
- Butch Yates – assistant engineer
- Frank DeLuna – mastering at A&M Mastering Studios (Hollywood, California, US)
- Simon Ryan – cover design
- Michael Putland – cover photography
