= A Round and a Bout =

Live album by Squeeze
- Released: 1990
- Recorded: 11 & 16 January 1990
- Genres: New wave, power pop
- Length: 68:46
- Labels: I.R.S. Deptford Fun City
- Producers: Steve Forward; Glenn Tilbrook

Squeeze chronology
| Frank (1989) | A Round and a Bout (1990) | Play (1991) |

Singles from A Round and a Bout
- 1. "Annie Get Your Gun (live)" Released: April 1990 (US only)

Professional ratings
Review scores
| Source | Rating |
|---|---|
| Allmusic | 2/5 stars |

A Round and a Bout is a live album by the British new wave group Squeeze, released in 1990 by I.R.S. Records and Deptford Fun City Records. A concert video was released with the same title, and contained mostly the same performances from the LP. The album spent one week at number 50 in the UK Albums Chart in April 1990.

== Track listing ==
All songs written by Chris Difford and Glenn Tilbrook except as indicated.

=== CD ===
1. "Footprints" – 5:33
2. "Pulling Mussels (From the Shell)" – 4:04
3. "Black Coffee in Bed" – 8:29
4. "She Doesn't Have to Shave" – 3:47
5. "Is That Love?" – 2:36
6. "Dr. Jazz" (Jools Holland) – 5:35
7. "Up the Junction" – 2:54
8. "Slaughtered, Gutted and Heartbroken" – 4:20
9. "Take Me I'm Yours" – 4:01
10. "If It's Love" – 4:59
11. "Hourglass" – 4:05
12. "Labelled with Love" – 4:17
13. "Annie Get Your Gun" – 3:26
14. "Tempted" – 5:34
15. "By Your Side" – 5:06

=== LP ===
1. "Footprints"
2. "Pulling Mussels (From the Shell)"
3. "Black Coffee in Bed"
4. "Slaughtered, Gutted and Heartbroken"
5. "Annie Get Your Gun"
6. "Hourglass"
7. "She Doesn't Have to Shave"
8. "By Your Side"
9. "Tempted"
10. "Labelled with Love"

=== Cassette ===
1. "Footprints"
2. "Pulling Mussels (From the Shell)"
3. "Black Coffee in Bed"
4. "She Doesn't Have to Shave"
5. "Is That Love?"
6. "Dr. Jazz"
7. "Up the Junction"
8. "Hourglass"
9. "Slaughtered, Gutted and Heartbroken"
10. "If It's Love"
11. "Labelled with Love"
12. "Annie Get Your Gun"
13. "Tempted"
14. "By Your Side"

== Personnel ==
Squeeze

- Chris Difford – guitar, vocals
- Jools Holland – keyboards, vocals
- Matt Irving – keyboards, accordion, backing vocals
- Gilson Lavis – drums
- Glenn Tilbrook – guitars, vocals
- Keith Wilkinson – bass, backing vocals
