= Difford & Tilbrook =

Songwriting team of Chris Difford and Glenn Tilbrook

Difford & Tilbrook are the songwriting team of Chris Difford and Glenn Tilbrook, known for their work as the principal writers for the new wave rock band Squeeze. In addition to playing guitar for the band, they are responsible for the group's many hits, including "Cool for Cats", "Up the Junction", "Another Nail in My Heart", "Pulling Mussels (From the Shell)", "Tempted" and "Annie Get Your Gun". They have both written independently outside the band, and together wrote the music for the British sitcom Girls on Top starring Dawn French, Jennifer Saunders, Ruby Wax and Tracey Ullman.

Difford & Tilbrook was also the name under which the pair recorded and toured following the temporary break-up of Squeeze in 1982. That band reunited in 1985 after one self-titled album had been released from the pair. By 1993, Difford and Tilbrook were the only original members left in Squeeze. Difford left Squeeze in 1999, and the band toured without him before breaking up later that year. Both Difford and Tilbrook then established independent solo careers beginning in 2000, and have maintained those solo careers even after reforming Squeeze in 2007. Squeeze now consists of a rotating band membership assembling around the two songwriters.

Beginning in the summer of 2014 and continuing into 2015, Difford & Tilbrook began touring as a duo, playing Squeeze hits in smaller venues in the UK. Squeeze, still operating as a full band, continued to play occasional festival shows during this time.

== Discography ==
=== Albums ===
- Difford & Tilbrook (1984)

=== Singles ===
- 1984: "Love's Crashing Waves" No. 57 UK
- 1984: "Hope Fell Down"
- 1984: "Picking Up the Pieces"
- 2018: "Take Me I'm Yours" (with Robert Glasper and Questlove)
