= Ridiculous (album) =

Studio album by Squeeze
- Released: 13 November 1995
- Studios: Chipping Norton Recording Studios (Chipping Norton, Oxfordshire); 45 RPM Studios (Blackheath, London); Nomis Studios (London)
- Genre: Rock
- Length: 55:51
- Labels: A&M; IRS (US)
- Producers: Peter Smith and Glenn Tilbrook

Squeeze chronology
Some Fantastic Place (1993)	Ridiculous (1995)	Domino (1998)

Singles from Ridiculous
- 1. "This Summer" Released: 21 August 1995; 2. "Electric Trains" Released: 30 October 1995; 3. "Heaven Knows" Released: 27 May 1996; 4. "This Summer (Remix)" Released: 12 August 1996

Ridiculous is an album by the British new wave group Squeeze. It was the band's eleventh studio album, and it introduced their latest drummer Kevin Wilkinson (no relation to bassist Keith Wilkinson). As on the previous album, Some Fantastic Place, the band recorded one song penned by Keith Wilkinson. This time, however, Wilkinson did not perform the lead vocals. That song, "Got to Me", is the last Wilkinson would write with Squeeze. Chris Difford sang lead on two songs, "Long Face" and "Fingertips". He had not performed lead on an album cut since "Slaughtered, Gutted and Heartbroken" and "Love Circles" on the 1989 album Frank. This record was produced by Glenn Tilbrook and Peter Smith.

The album spent one week at number 50 in the UK Albums Chart.

== Music ==
A clear distinction, noted by Stephen Thomas Erlewine, between Ridiculous and predecessors such as Play and Some Fantastic Place was a "stripped-down, matter of fact production", giving the record a "crisper and livelier" feel. Erlewine compared the "jangling" style of "Grouch of the Day" with that of the 1965 Beatles album Rubber Soul.

The editors for both the Washington Post and The Hamilton Spectator described "This Summer" as a "buoyant" song. The Independent stated the song was "an odd reverse homage which seeks to reclaim Squeeze's rightful place in the Cockney Brit-pop hierarchy", but also "the best track here". Newsday stated the single "is tailor-made for pop radio".

== Release ==
To promoted the album, the band released their first single, "This Summer", on 21 August 1995. Two versions of the single were released, each with entirely different B-sides. Disc 1 contained a live cover of Britpop group Blur's song "End of a Century". The single peaked at number 36 in the UK Singles Chart in September 1995. Almost a year later, on 12 August 1996, Squeeze released a remix version of "This Summer". The remix is extremely similar to the original mix, essentially just with a slightly more prominent drum track. This version charted marginally better than the original, peaking at #32; to date, this represents Squeeze's final appearance on any singles chart in any country. Three versions of the single were released, each with a different set of B-sides.

The second single, "Electric Trains", was released on 30 October 1995. It peaked at number 44 in the UK Singles Chart. Two versions of the single were released, each with entirely different B-sides. Chris Difford later recorded a stripped-down version of the song titled "Playing With Electric Trains" on his 2002 solo album I Didn't Get Where I Am.

== Reception ==
Professional ratings
Review scores
Source	Rating
AllMusic	3/5 stars

Stephen Thomas Erlewine of AllMusic gave a primarily praising summary of Ridiculous, commenting that it "stands as a testament to the enduring quality of their craft" and was "every bit as enjoyable" as their other post-reunion efforts.

In August 1996, Alex Diamond of PopEntertainment.com proclaimed Ridiculous to possibly be "the band's best overall album since 1981's East Side Story".

== Track listing ==
All songs written by Chris Difford and Glenn Tilbrook except as indicated.

1. "Electric Trains" – 4:03
2. "Heaven Knows" – 4:34
3. "Grouch of the Day" – 3:27
4. "Walk Away" – 4:43
5. "This Summer" – 3:39
6. "Got to Me" (Keith Wilkinson) – 3:45
7. "Long Face" – 4:31
8. "I Want You" – 4:03
9. "Daphne" – 3:44
10. "Lost for Words" – 1:59
11. "Great Escape" – 3:27
12. "Temptation for Love" – 3:37
13. "Sound Asleep" – 4:38
14. "Fingertips" – 5:40
15. "This Road" – 3:09 *
16. "This Summer", remix – 3:33 *
17. "Cappuccino Lips (Fingertips)" – 4:06 *
18. "Electric Trains", live acoustic – 3:37 *
19. "I Want You", live acoustic – 3:41 *
20. "Grouch Of The Day", live acoustic – 3:10 *

Tracks 15–20 are bonus tracks on the 2007 Expanded Edition

== Personnel ==
Squeeze

- Chris Difford – guitars, backing vocals, lead vocals on "Long Face" and "Fingertips"
- Glenn Tilbrook – keyboards, guitars, lead and backing vocals
- Keith Wilkinson – bass, backing vocals
- Kevin Wilkinson – drums, cymbals

with:

- Chris Braide – backing vocals
- Cathy Dennis – co-lead vocals on "Temptation for Love"
- Jon Savannah – keyboards on "Walk Away"

Production

- Glenn Tilbrook – producer
- Peter Smith – producer, arrangements
- Squeeze – arrangements
- Barry Hammond – engineer
- Ben Darlow – assistant engineer
- Mark "Spike" Stent – mixing
- Alan Douglas – mix assistant
- Jegs – mix assistant
- Kevin Shaw – design
