= Some Fantastic Place =

Studio album by Squeeze
- Released: 14 September 1993
- Recorded: 1993, London
- Genre: Pop rock
- Length: 48:17
- Label: A&M
- Producer: Squeeze, Peter Smith

Squeeze chronology
Play (1991)	Some Fantastic Place (1993)	Ridiculous (1995)

Singles from Some Fantastic Place
- 1. "Third Rail" Released: 12 July 1993; 2. "Everything in the World" Released: 1993 (US only); 3. "Some Fantastic Place" Released: 30 August 1993; 4. "Loving You Tonight" Released: 18 October 1993; 5. "It's Over" Released: 28 February 1994

Some Fantastic Place is the tenth studio album by the British new wave group Squeeze, released in 1993 by A&M Records. Their first album since the departure of original Squeeze drummer Gilson Lavis, it features Pete Thomas and the brief return of keyboardist/vocalist Paul Carrack, who had previously appeared on East Side Story (1981). "Loving You Tonight" became only the second Squeeze song cut in thirteen years to feature Carrack singing a lead part. Additionally, bassist Keith Wilkinson wrote and sang "True Colours (The Storm)", the first song on a Squeeze album not written by Glenn Tilbrook, Chris Difford, Jools Holland, or any combination of those three.

The album features a pop rock style and was produced by Squeeze and Peter Smith. Recorded in Tilbrook's recently built personal studios, the recording sessions involved a larger deal of debate concerning song structures, which the band said helped contribute towards the album's passionate sound. Unusually, Glenn Tilbrook and Chris Difford wrote songs together rather than apart, which they suggested helped revitalise their working relationship. The album was released to critical acclaim, and the title track remains Difford and Tilbrook's favourite Squeeze song. The album reached number 26 in the UK Albums Chart.

== Background ==
A&M Records had dropped Squeeze following the commercial disappointment of Frank (1989), and they subsequently signed to Reprise Records for the release of Play (1991). However, the album was another sales failure and the band, who were then dropped again and subsequently resigned to A&M for Some Fantastic Place. Around this period, drummer Gilson Lavis, who had played on all of Squeeze's albums up until this point, left the band. Glenn Tilbrook reflected: "He just got tired of being in the band, and it was time for him to move on. It's bound to be emotional when you've worked with somebody for that long, but I think it was the right decision for Gil to make, and it's not tempered with any bitterness." Lavis later elaborated on this -- while not disputing Tibrook's overall account, he claimed he was fired from the band rather than leaving entirely of his own accord: "I was kicked out after an American tour. I’d just separated from my wife and I was in a bit of a state. I’d been sober for seven years and I decided that having a drink would be a good idea. So on this tour I was a bit of a mess, and very depressed. When we got back there was a band meeting and I was told I wasn’t needed any more."

Squeeze, at the time consisting of songwriters Chris Difford and Glenn Tilbrook and bassist Keith Wilkinson, originally intended to record Some Fantastic Place as a trio with the addition of programmed drum and keyboard instruments, but ultimately opted to add several members. When Difford and Tilbrook were performing an acoustic show, they noticed Paul Carrack, who had been with the band in 1981 (playing keyboards on East Side Story and also singing its hit single "Tempted"), was nearby. They asked him to open live for them, thinking it would be unlikely, but nonetheless he agreed. When the band were rehearsing for Some Fantastic Place, Difford suggested the band readmit Carrack into the band, which they put "to the test". Difford later said "it's worked out marvellously."

Meanwhile, the band line-up was completed by drummer Pete Thomas, previously of Elvis Costello's backing band The Attractions. Tilbrook said that Thomas gave the album a "very different rhythmical approach" to other Squeeze albums, explaining: "Pete is a song-orientated drummer. He listens to the song and decides what's needed from him -- which is great for us, as we're also song-orientated."

== Writing and recording ==
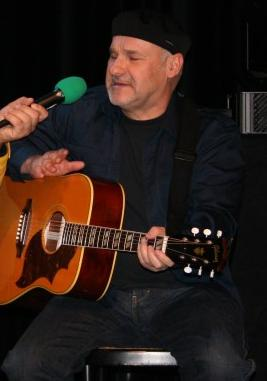
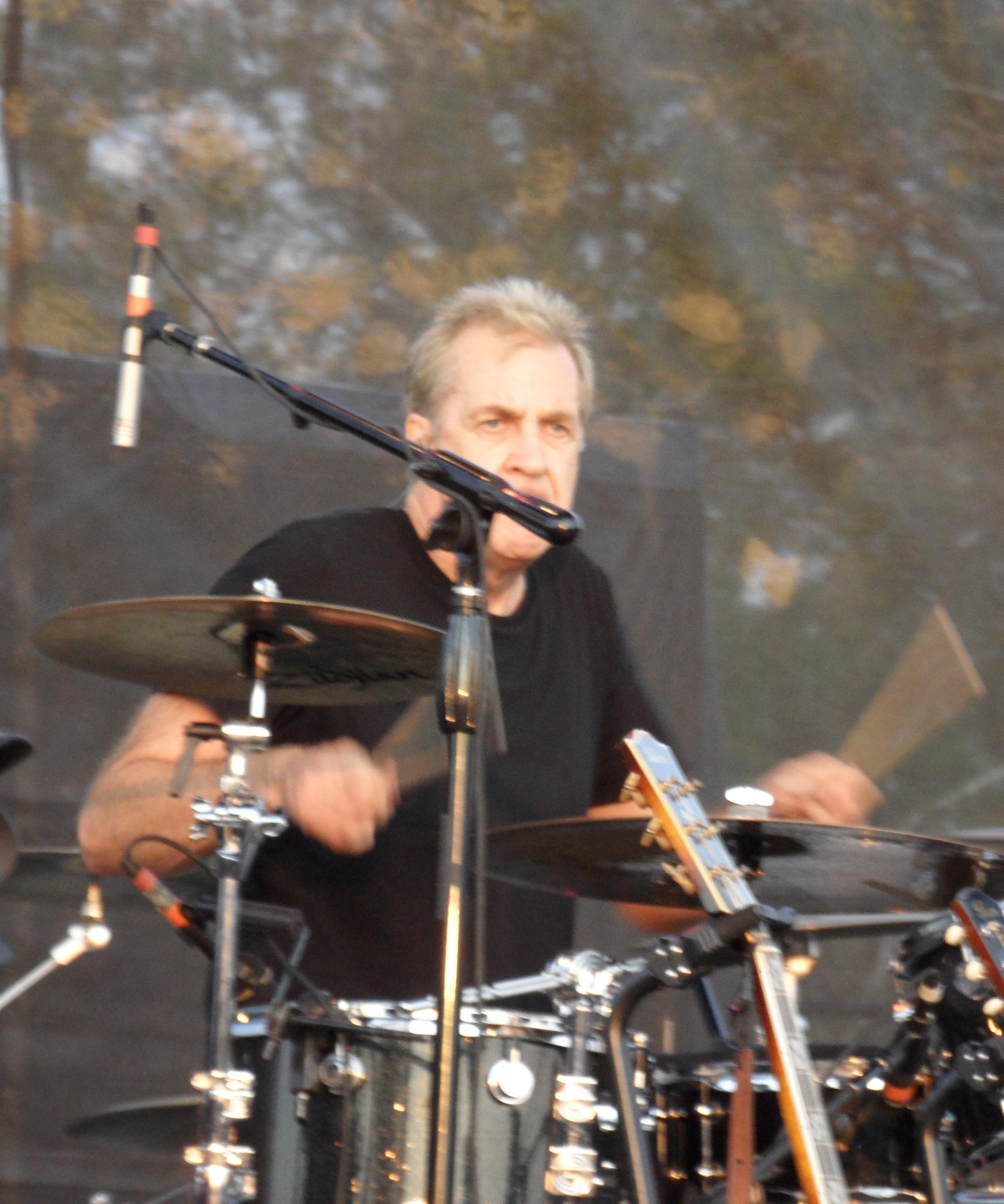
Paul Carrack and Pete Thomas, who joined the band prior to Some Fantastic Place.

Some Fantastic Place marked another change for the band, in that Difford and Tilbrook, who typically write lyrics and music separately (with Difford usually giving Tilbook completed lyrics to write the music for), went for a relatively simplistic approach, sitting down together and writing the majority of the album as a team. The duo credited this approach with revitalising their working relationship, bringing about a "big jump" in their creativity level. Tilbrook commented: "It was like discovering a new partnership, because suddenly we were able to bounce ideas back and forth off each other."

Tilbrook had recently built a recording studio near his London home, so the band visited the studio everyday, both rehearsing and recording the record there. The studio was allegedly located in Blackheath above a welder's shop. The writing took approximately two months, and "for two or three of the songs, [the band] sat in the same room with each other." Difford explained: "Glenn created an environment, and to leave our homes and go and work together was something new. It was good to sit in the same room and be inventive. It makes things simpler; you don't have to wait for the results. It's quite inspirational." The studio was relatively small, which Tilbrook felt worked for the band just as he hoped it would, noting the "really good vibe."

Compared to previous albums, more open debate concerning the song arrangements occurred between members than on any previous Squeeze album, which Difford called "a lot of to-ing and fro-ing" and believed helped make Some Fantastic Place one of the band's better albums. Each band member had strong ideas on how they wanted the songs to be, and they stood on firm ground when they believed they were right. Difford enjoyed this experience "because it showed that people really cared."

== Music and lyrics ==
Some Fantastic Place maintains a mix of "emotionally complex storytelling and uplifting songcraft," in the words of Harold Dumuir of Pulse. Difford felt Some Fantastic Place would be ideal for reintroducing the band into the public consciousness: "In some respects, we really need to reeducate people about Squeeze, and remind them that we're here, and I think that this is a good album to do that with, because it contains all the best elements of what Squeeze has always been. It's got a good balance of optimism and pessimism, light and dark, up and down, yin and yang." Most songs are sung by Tilbrook, with Difford sticking to background harmonies. Musically, the album is warm, simplistic and lively, featuring the band's signature pop rock sound, as exemplified throughout the record with songs as varied as the melodic power pop of "Third Rail" and blue-eyed soul of "Loving You Tonight".

Failed and failing relationships are a recurring theme on the album. Mat Snow of Q noted the bittersweet kitchen sink style of the lyrics, while Gary Leboff of Vox felt the album was less offbeat than previous Squeeze albums, with fewer East End characters in the band's lyrics than usual, though nonetheless maintaining a quirkiness, citing "Cold Shoulder" and "Jolly Comes Home", which he described as "a 'Labelled with Love'-esque reflection on suburban mundanity." Trouser Press noted "sharply noted details" in the lyrics: "[T]he initialed 45s left behind in 'Images of Loving,' an attempted rapprochement in 'It's Over,' a cat flap in the kitchen door that provides a dog's-eye view in 'Cold Shoulder'."

The album's title track, with its balanced themes of loss and acceptance, is a tribute to Maxine Barker, a longtime friend of the band who had been responsible for first introducing Tilbrook and Difford in the early 1970s and who succumbed to leukemia in 1992. The song was described by Tilbrook as "one of those songs that wrote itself; it was done straight off in about 10 minutes." The singer incorporated a guitar solo in the song which he wrote when he and Difford met in 1973. "Jolly Come Home" – a quietly intense song – and "Cold Shoulder", which was penned by Difford during a 65-mile car drive, inject mordant humour into themes of domestic dysfunction. Music critic Gary Leboff said of the latter song: "'Cold Shoulder' does everything right: an opening image of our love-battered and locked-out hero peering through the cat-flap at the missus's feet, a wistful tune counterpointed by a sardonic guitar line, every detail poignant in its starkness. In this mode, Squeeze kill you softly every time."

Among other melodic songs that document stalled romances, "Third Rail" uses an electric railway for an emotional metaphor, while "Everything in the World" was influenced by Motown music and uses a conspicuous beat which drowns out the vocals and melody, drawing comparison to the Vandellas. Carrack's "Loving You Tonight" is in a mellow soul style, while Wilkinson makes his vocal and songwriting debut with "True Colours (The Storm)", a tropical and calypso flavoured song. He had brought several songs to Squeeze throughout his tenure with the band and "we'd figured he'd waited in line long enough," according to Tilbrook. "Pinocchio" is an ambitious song with forthright lyrics, described by one critic as "a tale of Jack the Laddish deceit."

== Release and reception ==
Professional ratings
Review scores
Source	Rating
Allmusic	2.5/5 stars
Chicago Tribune	3/4 stars
Q	4/5 stars
Vox	7/10

"Third Rail" was released as a single ahead of the album on 12 July 1993, reaching number 39 in the UK Singles Chart, while "Everything in the World" was released in the United States only, reaching number 9 on the American US Modern Rock charts. A&M Records released Some Fantastic Place on 14 September 1993, where it was a modest hit, reaching number 26 on the UK Albums Chart. The subsequent singles from the album were less successful; "Some Fantastic Place", issued in August 1993, reached number 73, while October's "Loving You Tonight" single did not chart. The final single, February 1994's "It's Over", reached number 89. Squeeze went on a nationwide tour of Britain in promotion of the album, where both older and new songs were well received by audiences. As of 1996, Some Fantastic Place had sold 67,800 copies.

Some Fantastic Place was released to positive reviews from music critics. Mat Snow of Q rated the album four stars out of five and called it "another fine Squeeze album [...] with the usual complement of perfectly realised songs and bittersweet kitchen sinkery." Gary Leboff of Vox called the album "another collection stuffed with melodic treats and lyrical wit, for consumption by an audience significantly smaller than they deserve." He highlighted the last two songs as the best on the album. Despite a score of two and a half stars out of five, Chris Woodstra of AllMusic was favourable, saying "the classic sound is still there" and concluding that it was "[a]nother in a series of commercial sleepers, but definitely worth a listen."

Mark Caro of the Chicago Tribune hailed the album for "[providing] room and reason to dig" compared to the band's previous few albums, writing that Tilborok and Difford "have brightened up musically while maintaining the crown as pop-rock's most tuneful and trenchant observers of romantic breakdowns." He described Difford's protagonists as "still getting into awkward positions" while Tilbrook "provides snaky pop", whereas "Jolly Comes Home" is "as incisive and beautiful a ballad as the band has recorded." Phoenix New Times reflected that the album was "an adult, yet considerably bouncier, work" than prior Squeeze albums. Trouser Press criticised the writing, finding too many songs to talk of romantic break-ups, but nonetheless felt the album was "lively and unpretentious."

In The Rough Guide to Rock, Nick Dale highlights it as one of Squeeze's four most essential albums and their "most successful release since Babylon and On, and for good reason." He wrote the band showed "no signs of flagging" and noted the growing sophistication and sensitivity on the title track and "Loving You Tonight," while also highlighting the title track, "Cold Shoulder" and "Third Rail" as the best songs on the album. Elton John bought twenty copies of the album for his numerous homes and cars. The album's title track remains one of the band's favourite Squeeze songs. After the release of the album, Carrack and Thomas left the band on amicable terms.

== Track listing ==
All songs written by Chris Difford and Glenn Tilbrook except as indicated.

1. "Everything in the World" – 4:30
2. "Some Fantastic Place" – 4:32
3. "Third Rail" – 3:39
4. "Loving You Tonight" – 4:49
5. "It's Over" – 3:45
6. "Cold Shoulder" – 5:48
7. "Talk to Him" – 3:46
8. "Jolly Comes Home" – 5:00
9. "Images of Loving" – 4:10
10. "True Colours (The Storm)" (Keith Wilkinson) – 3:39
11. "Pinocchio" – 4:42

== Personnel ==
Squeeze

- Paul Carrack – keyboards, backing vocals; lead vocal on 4
- Chris Difford – backing vocals; guitar on 3, 5, 6, 7, 9
- Glenn Tilbrook – lead and backing vocals, guitars, keyboards, sitar, balalaika, percussion
- Pete Thomas – drums, percussion
- Keith Wilkinson – bass, backing vocals; ukulele and lead vocal on 10

with:

- Chris Braide – backing vocals on 1, 3, 5, 7, 9
- Marilyn McFarlane – backing vocals on 1
- Pete Smith – backing vocals on 10
- Frank Mead, Martin Drover, Neil Sidwell, Nick Pentelow – horns on 4
- Catherine Martin, Lucy Griffith, Rebecca Jones, Tanera Dawkins – strings on 8
