= Sunday Street =

Sunday Street may refer to:

- "Sunday Street" (song), a 1991 song by Squeeze
- Sunday Street (album), a 1976 album by Dave Van Ronk
