= This Summer (disambiguation) =

"This Summer" is a 1995 song by Squeeze.

This Summer may refer to:

- This Summer, 2019 EP by Alessia Cara

== See also ==
- "This Summer's Gonna Hurt like a Motherfucker", a song by Maroon 5, 2015
- "This Summer I", a song by Vitamin C from More, 2001
