= Loving You Tonight =

Single by Squeeze

from the album Some Fantastic Place
- Released: 18 October 1993 (UK)
- Genre: Blue-eyed soul
- Length: 4:49
- Label: A&M
- Songwriter(s): Glenn Tilbrook; Chris Difford
- Producer(s): Squeeze; Peter Smith

Squeeze singles chronology
"Some Fantastic Place" (1993)	"Loving You Tonight" (1993)	"It's Over" (1994)

"Loving You Tonight" is the fourth single released from English rock band Squeeze's tenth album, Some Fantastic Place. Lead vocals on the song are by Paul Carrack. The only other time Carrack sang lead on a Squeeze track was in 1981, on the better-known "Tempted."

Squeeze also re-recorded the song for their 2010 CD Spot the Difference. For that version, Squeeze member Glenn Tilbrook sang lead vocal. The singles listings below all refer to the Carrack-sung version from 1993.

== Song details ==
=== Musical style ===
A blue-eyed soul effort, the similarities to the previous Squeeze hit "Tempted" have been noted, Chris Woodstra of AllMusic calling the song "nearly a rewrite" of the 1981 single.

== Track listing ==
=== 7" vinyl and cassette ===
1. "Loving You Tonight" (4:49)
2. "Loving You Tonight (7" edit)" (4:03)

=== 12" vinyl ===
1. "Loving You Tonight" (4:49)
2. "Loving You Tonight (radio mix)" (?:??)
3. "Loving You Tonight (7" edit)" (4:03)
4. "Loving You Tonight (instrumental)" (?:??)

=== CD (digipak) ===
1. "Loving You Tonight" (4:49)
2. "Loving You Tonight (7" edit)" (4:03)
3. "Tempted (Virgin radio session)" (4:12)
4. "Third Rail (Virgin radio session)" (3:37)

=== CD (promo) ===
1. "Loving You Tonight (Bob Jones Radio Remix)" (4:01)
