= Separate Beds =

Separate Beds may refer to:

- "Separate Beds", the third track on Squeeze's 1980 album, Argybargy
- "Separate Beds", a song by New Found Glory appearing on the deluxe edition of their 2011 album, Radiosurgery
- Separate Beds, a 1968 Iranian film by director Iraj Ghaderi
