= It's Over (Squeeze song) =

Single by Squeeze

from the album Some Fantastic Place
- Released: 28 February 1994 (UK)
- Recorded: 1993 (London)
- Genre: Rock
- Length: 3:45
- Label: A&M
- Songwriters: Glenn Tilbrook and Chris Difford
- Producers: Squeeze & Peter Smith

Squeeze singles chronology
"Loving You Tonight" (1993)	"It's Over" (1994)	"This Summer" (1995)

"It's Over" is a song by Squeeze, released as their fifth and final single from their tenth album, Some Fantastic Place (which had been issued in 1993).

Squeeze wrote and recorded another song called "It's Over" on their 2026 album Trixies. Despite having the same title and performer, the two songs are unrelated.

== Track listing ==
=== 7" vinyl and cassette ===
1. "It's Over" (3:45)
2. "Is That Love (live)" (2:45)

=== CD ===
1. "It's Over" (3:45)
2. "Is That Love (live)" (2:45)
3. "Pulling Mussels (From the Shell) (live)" (3:55)
4. "Goodbye Girl (live)" (5:24)
