= Electric train =

An electric train is a train powered by electricity, and may refer to:

- Electric locomotive
- Electric multiple unit
- Battery electric multiple unit
- Railway electrification system
- Tram

== Other uses ==
- "Electric Trains", a 1995 song by Squeeze
