= I've Returned =

Single by Squeeze

from the album Sweets from a Stranger
- Released: 1982 (Netherlands)
- Recorded: 1981
- Genre: Rock, new wave
- Length: 2:36
- Label: A&M
- Songwriter(s): Glenn Tilbrook and Chris Difford
- Producer(s): Squeeze & Phil McDonald

Squeeze singles chronology
"When the Hangover Strikes" (1982)	"I've Returned" (1982)	"Annie Get Your Gun" (1982)

"I've Returned" is a single in the Netherlands, released from Squeeze's fifth album, Sweets from a Stranger.

== Background ==
Glenn Tillbrook said of the song, "It's slightly grandiose-sounding, which is not my cup of tea really. On the whole it's not a bad version. It's a bit like Bruce Springsteen's 'Born to Run'. And yet another song about drinking." Chris Difford said, "'I've Returned' could have been on East Side Story. It's a lyric that reflects our early writing, so I suppose we were beginning to repeat ourselves. We were cocooned in a web of touring and it was suffocating our skills. We didn't have any time to observe".

The song also was a popular live number at the time. Tillbrook said, "We used to do this as the first number in the set, to replace 'In Quintessence'."

== Reception ==
Cash Box praised its " sheer playfulness," calling it a "quick 'n clever slab of wry pop/rock."

== Track listing ==
1. "I've Returned" (2:36)
2. "When the Hangover Strikes" (4:31)
