= If I Didn't Love You =

If I Didn't Love You may refer to:

- "If I Didn't Love You" (Jason Aldean and Carrie Underwood song)
- "If I Didn't Love You" (Steve Wariner song)
- "If I Didn't Love You" (Tina Arena song)
- "If I Didn't Love You" (Squeeze song)

== See also ==
- If I Loved You
