= Down in the Valley =

Down in the Valley may refer to:

- "Down in the Valley" (folk song) ("Birmingham Jail"), American folk song
- Down in the Valley (film), film directed by David Jacobson (2005)
- Down in the Valley (opera), Kurt Weill opera (1948)
- "Down in the Valley" (Solomon Burke song), rhythm and blues song (1962)
- "Down in the Valley" (Squeeze song), rock single (1998)
- Down in the Valley: Barn Aid Benefit Concert, live album (2001)
- Down in the Valley, a song by The Head and The Heart, from the album The Head and the Heart
- Down in the Valley (album), album by The Handsome Family
- Down in the Valley, a docuseries inspired by P-Valley (2024)
