= When the Hangover Strikes =

Single by Squeeze

from the album Sweets from a Stranger
- Released: July 1982 (UK)
- Recorded: 1981
- Genre: Pop rock, blue-eyed soul
- Length: 4:31
- Label: A&M
- Songwriter(s): Chris Difford and Glenn Tilbrook
- Producer(s): Squeeze & Phil McDonald

Squeeze singles chronology
"Black Coffee in Bed" (1982)	"When the Hangover Strikes" (1982)	"I've Returned" (1982)

"When the Hangover Strikes" was the second single released from Squeeze's fifth album, Sweets from a Stranger.

== Background ==
Glenn Tillbrook has said that the track was subconsciously inspired by Frank Sinatra. "I'd started listening to the albums Frank Sinatra made for Capitol in the '50s, which he recorded primarily with producer Nelson Riddle. The instrumentation on those albums was fantastic and contained a certain mood and direction to them that had nothing to do with the record that had come before. ... I wasn't thinking this consciously when i wrote 'Hangover'. It's just that when I listen to any sort of music some of it trickles out in one way or other."

Chris Difford said of the song, "Lyrically this was the finest song on the album for me. All the imagery is so correct and goes beautifully with the music." Tillbrook said, "This is the first track that I'm proud of on [Sweets from a Stranger]."

== Release ==
"When the Hangover Strikes" was released as the follow-up single to "Black Coffee in Bed" in July 1982, backed with the track "Elephant Girl." However, unlike its predecessor, it failed to chart at all. Glenn Tillbrook said on the single's release, "I was convinced it would be a smash hit, which just goes to show what Mr 'Finger on the Pulse' Tillbrook knew. I thought, 'The kids'll love this. They'll go crazy for it.' But it was about blokes getting hangovers, which was totally unsexy." Chris Difford said, "The fact that the record company would endorse it is amazing. It wouldn't happen now."

It was the first UK single culled from one of the band's albums not to achieve a position on the Singles Chart ("Christmas Day" also had not charted, but that was not an album cut).

== Track listing ==
1. "When the Hangover Strikes" (4:31)
2. "Elephant Girl" (3:30)
