= If It's Love (Squeeze song) =

Single by Squeeze

from the album Frank
- Released: September 1989 (UK)
- Recorded: 1989 (London)
- Genre: Pop rock
- Length: 4:02
- Label: A&M
- Songwriters: Glenn Tilbrook and Chris Difford
- Producers: Eric "ET" Thorngren & Glenn Tilbrook

Squeeze singles chronology
"Footprints" (1988)	"If It's Love" (1989)	"Love Circles" (1990)

"If It's Love" is the first single released from Squeeze's eighth album, Frank.

"If It's Love" started as demo titled "If I'm Dead". Tilbrook recalled, "It was about being dead. It was a completely different song; the tune was the same, but in a very florid, dreamy atmosphere, and the words were about being dead. We demo-ed it for the Babylon and On album, and it wasn't a particularly popular choice with anyone, including ourselves." The band then revisited the song for Frank because Tilbrook "thought that there were possibilities there." Tilbrook concluded, "Chris came up with another lyric for it, and I (redid the demo). So it ended up being a reggae song."

"If It's Love" reached number seven on the U.S. Modern Rock Tracks chart in 1989. It additionally appeared in live form on A Round and a Bout, featuring an audience singalong portion.

Spin Magazine commented, "'If It's Love' beautifully captures the anxious optimism of a new relationship, topped off with a hint of Tilbook's fluttering falsetto." Phoenix New Times dubbed the song "D&T's answer record to their own 'Is That Love' and their most infectious single in many a moon in June." Popdose described the song as a "lost classic." uDiscoverMusic called it a "sterling 45."

In 2010 the song was featured in a television advertisement for eHarmony.

== Track listing ==
7" vinyl

1. "If It's Love" (Chris Difford, Glenn Tilbrook, Julian Holland, Gilson Lavis, Keith Wilkinson) — 4:02
2. "Frank's Bag" — 3:42

12" vinyl and CD

1. "If It's Love" — 4:02
2. "Frank's Bag" (Difford, Tilbrook, Holland, Lavis, Wilkinson) — 3:42
3. "Vanity Fair (piano version)" — 3:08
