= Love's Crashing Waves =

Single by Difford & Tilbrook

from the album Difford & Tilbrook
- Released: June 1984 (UK)
- Genre: New wave
- Length: 3:03
- Label: A&M
- Songwriters: Chris Difford, Glenn Tilbrook
- Producer: Tony Visconti

Difford & Tilbrook singles chronology
"Love's Crashing Waves" (1984)	"Hope Fell Down" (1984)

"Love's Crashing Waves" is a song written by Difford & Tilbrook and released on their 1984 self-titled debut album.

== Background ==
Released as the first single from Difford & Tilbrook, "Love's Crashing Waves" saw moderate commercial success. Though considered the most commercial song on the album, it saw limited chart success: it was the act's only charting single in the UK (reaching number 57), and by 1985 Chris Difford and Glenn Tilbrook had re-formed their previous (and more popular) band, Squeeze. Difford recalled,

Musically, Glenn did a masterful job of arranging [the songs on Difford and Tilbrook], because they were complicated. "Love's Crashing Waves" was about as commercial as we got on the whole album. And that pissed everybody off, particularly [manager Shep Gordon], who wanted us to be as big as Squeeze.

And the house that we filmed [the video] in, is now owned by Adele. It's the only link I have to her, apart from seeing her in Waitrose once . . . .

Difford & Tilbrook created a music video for the song, which was filmed in Brighton.

Squeeze have, on a few occasions, played this song live. Difford has since cited the song as one he would like Squeeze to revisit in its live set, commenting, "It was from a time when Glenn and I weren’t getting on particularly well, but we were still able to write some fantastic songs".

Salon's Annie Zaleski described the song as a "sophisto-pop gem".

== Track listing ==
7"

1. "Love's Crashing Waves" (3:03)
2. "Within These Walls of Without You" (2:59)

12"

1. "Love's Crashing Waves" (3:03)
2. "Within These Walls of Without You" (2:50)
3. "Love's Crashing Waves (Extended Remix)" (4:50)
