= The Elephant Ride =

1982 song performed by Squeeze

Song by Squeeze

from the album Sweets from a Stranger
- Released: May 1982
- Recorded: 1981
- Genre: Rock, new wave
- Length: 3:22
- Label: A&M
- Songwriter(s): Chris Difford, Glenn Tilbrook
- Producer(s): Squeeze; Phil McDonald

"The Elephant Ride" is a song by the British new wave band Squeeze. It was written by Chris Difford and Glenn Tilbrook, and it appeared on their 1982 album Sweets from a Stranger.

== Background ==
Glenn Tilbrook said, "This is one of my favorite songs. It's beautiful and very much influenced by The Beach Boys in its arrangement, if not the tune. I'd been listening to Pet Sounds an awful lot at the time and this was one of the songs where rather than oppose the mood of the lyric, I tried to reflect it."

Chris Difford said, "This comes from a set of songs with "elephant" in the title. It was a story I came up with about a skinhead who had fallen in love with an Indian girl in Charlton. They couldn't hang out with each other because their parents wouldn't go along with the cross-pollination of their relationship. I thought it would make a good musical, because it was a racial story."

== Reception ==
AllMusic critic Stephen Thomas Erlewine said in his review of Sweets from a Stranger that "The Elephant Ride" was "shimmering" and "gorgeous."
