= Heartbreaking World =

Single by Squeeze

from the album Cosi Fan Tutti Frutti
- Released: October 1985 (UK)
- Recorded: 1985
- Genre: Pop rock, new wave
- Length: 5:07
- Label: A&M
- Songwriters: Jools Holland and Chris Difford
- Producer: Laurie Latham

Squeeze singles chronology
"Hits of the Year" (1985)	"Heartbreaking World" (1985)	"By Your Side" (1985)

"Heartbreaking World", released Oct. 1985, is the third UK single released from Squeeze's sixth album, Cosi Fan Tutti Frutti. While every other Squeeze single was written by the team of Chris Difford and Glenn Tilbrook, this one was penned by Difford and keyboardist Jools Holland. This is also the only Squeeze single to feature a lead vocal by Holland. Holland's younger brother Chris Holland also plays emulator on this track.

The 1987 single "Angel Eyes (Home and Away)", a UK #5 hit by Wet Wet Wet, lifted a large portion of its lyric from "Heartbreaking World" word-for-word, initially without crediting lyricist Chris Difford. After Difford and his publisher threatened legal action, Difford's name was added to the writing credits for all subsequent releases of "[Angel Eyes (Home and Away)".

== Track listing ==
=== 7" ===
1. "Heartbreaking World" (5:07)
2. "Big Beng" (4:02)

=== 10" ===
1. "Heartbreaking World" (5:07)
2. "Big Beng" (4:02)
3. "By Your Side (live)" (4:32)
4. "Tempted (live)" (4:16)
