= If I Didn't Love You (Squeeze song) =

Single by Squeeze

from the album Argybargy
- B-side: "Pretty One"
- Released: 12 March 1980
- Recorded: 1979
- Genre: New wave; post-punk; pop
- Length: 4:11
- Label: A&M
- Songwriters: Chris Difford, Glenn Tilbrook
- Producers: John Wood, Squeeze

Squeeze singles chronology
"Another Nail in My Heart" (1980)	"If I Didn't Love You" (1980)	"Pulling Mussels (from the Shell)" (1980)

"If I Didn't Love You" is the ninth track from Squeeze's album Argybargy. The song, written by Glenn Tilbrook and Chris Difford, features lyrics about the early stages of a relationship and the insecurity that comes with it. The song has vocals and a slide guitar solo by Tilbrook.

The track was released as a single in the United States, where it received heavy radio play despite failing to chart. It has since seen positive critical reception and has appeared on the band's compilations and live setlists.

== Background ==
Glenn Tilbrook said of the song, "This is a really storming lyric from Chris [Difford] and was chosen as a different single in America. It was a massive radio hit there, particularly on the East Coast, whereas it was just an album track in Britain. The lyric caught a lot of people's imaginations because of that thing Chris does so well, picking up on small, almost irrelevant details. What he wrote here rang absolutely true to me and was all the more powerful for it." Tilbrook continued, "The line 'The record jumps on a scratch' was such a gift that I had to use it, so we sang 'If I, If I, If I, If I, If I.'"

Chris Difford said of his lyrics:

"Lyrically it has to be my proudest moment from [Argybargy] and it takes me back to New York when I was living there and writing lyrics. It's about the early cosy part of a relationship, which I call the nesting stage. It's a lovely place to be, somewhere where I think people only go two or three times in their life. At the same time it has that juxtaposition of emotions saying 'If I didn't love you I'd hate you,' because at the back of your mind you've got that insecurity about your inability to have a proper relationship with somebody."

Difford also praised Tilbrook's guitar solo, saying, "I also love Glenn's slide guitar solo. When he first did it I thought 'This guy's out of his tree. What's he doing?,' but it's brilliant." Tillbrook summed up his solo as "one of the most rock solos I've done, with an extra touch of new wave weirdness thrown in."

== Release ==
"If I Didn't Love You" was released in the USA as the second single from Argybargy, following "Another Nail in My Heart". The B-side of the single was the non-album track "Pretty One". A "Tiny Collectors Edition" with "Another Nail in My Heart" as the B-side was released after the initial single. Neither single was released in Britain.

"If I Didn't Love You" was released on Argybargy in 1980. In the United States, "If I Didn't Love You" was moved to the beginning of side two of Argybargy, while the UK release featured the song as the penultimate track on the album. The song has since appeared on Squeeze compilation albums, such as the American version of Singles – 45's and Under (in the UK, the album instead featured the East Side Story track "Labelled with Love"). The song was also a live favorite for the band; Difford said of performing the track, "I used to love playing this song live. Glenn and I sang it together as a duet, an octave apart."

The song has also appeared on the sixth season of the American television series Breaking Bad; Tilbrook said of the show's use of Squeeze songs, "It was really lovely."

== Reception ==
=== Critical opinion ===
AllMusic's Stephen Thomas Erlewine called the song "wonderfully wry", but the same site's Stewart Mason considered the track dated and as more of an experiment than a great single. BBC writer Chris Jones described "If I Didn't Love You" as "a song which encaspulates the double-edged pleasures of sexual advances" and stated that the line "'if I didn't love you I'd hate you' [is] able to sum up a universe in a couplet". Serene Dominic of the Phoenix New Times said the song "cement[s] the band's image as goofy, stay-at-home malcontents", while Annie Zaleski of Salon called the song "nervy". Josh Jackson of Paste Magazine said that the song "is full of dry wit but still manages to hint at some of the mushy stuff with lines like 'singles remind me of kisses/albums remind me of plans'". Cash Box called it an "adventuresome, yet quite palatable, pop single" that was influenced by the Beatles. Record World said that there is "a hint of Beatles in the harmony" and that "the lyrics are at once funny & off -beat while the rhythm asks for a dance."

=== Chart performance ===
When "If I Didn't Love You" was released as a single, it did not chart. Despite this, the song received popular radio play in the US and has since been described as a "fan favorite" for the band. Chris Difford reflected on this in an interview, saying, "'If I Didn't Love You' is a big song in America and not so big in the UK[.] ... [It] was a bit of a surprise when it suddenly got played on the radio over here."
