= Last Time Forever =

Single by Squeeze

from the album Cosi Fan Tutti Frutti
- Released: June 1985 (UK)
- Length: 4:15 / 6:23
- Label: A&M
- Songwriter(s): Glenn Tilbrook and Chris Difford
- Producer(s): Laurie Latham

Squeeze singles chronology
"Annie Get Your Gun" (1982)	"Last Time Forever" (1985)	"No Place Like Home" (1985)

"Last Time Forever" is the first single released from Squeeze's sixth album, Cosi Fan Tutti Frutti, and the band's first since 1982 (though main songwriters Chris Difford and Glenn Tilbrook had since recorded music as Difford & Tilbrook). The 12" version of the song, like the album version, contains brief samples from the film The Shining; the 7" version edits them out. The single reached number 45 on the UK Singles Chart.

The b-side "Suites From Five Strangers" actually consists of five separate songs, each approximately one minute in length, and each written, performed and produced by one of Squeeze's five members. In order, the songs are listed on the record sleeve and label as follows:

- A: Jools Holland – Rock 'N Roll (That's)
- B: Gilson Lavis – Proxy Rock
- C: Chris Difford – The Practising Clarinet
- D: Glenn Tilbrook – Spideey Goes To Tobago
- E: Keith Wilkinson – Who Wants To Be A Legionnaire?

Selections B, D and E are instrumentals.

== Track listing ==
=== 7" ===
1. "Last Time Forever" (4:15)
2. "Suites From Five Strangers" (5:24)

=== 12" ===
1. "Last Time Forever" (6:23)
2. "Suites From Five Strangers" (5:24)
