= I Think I'm Go Go =

Song by Squeeze

from the album Argybargy
- Released: February 1980
- Recorded: 1979
- Genre: Rock, new wave
- Length: 4:18
- Label: A&M
- Songwriter(s): Chris Difford, Glenn Tilbrook
- Producer(s): John Wood, Squeeze

"I Think I'm Go Go" is a 1980 song by the British new wave band Squeeze, released on their third album Argybargy. The lyrics were written by Chris Difford and the music was written by Glenn Tilbrook.

== Background ==
Chris Difford said about the lyrics, "This was a song about touring, which could be a very strange experiences. It would get to the stage where I'd think 'I don't know where I am, I don't know which county I am in, what time we're onstage, or who I'm sleeping with.' 'I think I'm go go' was the turn of phrase in the band at the time." Difford continued, "This song was very popular in America. The first verse is about being in Amsterdam because a lot of our early gigs were in Holland. Glenn's dad lived out there and he used to arrange gigs for us. It was always good fun playing there. The second verse is about New York and mentions liquor stores, rodeos and PIX, which was an American radio station. The last verse is about London."

Glenn Tilbrook said of the song, "This was a step forward in our imaginations. It was influenced lyrically by the fact we have been whopped around the head and rendered bewildered by the amount of traveling we'd been doing. We all found it bewildering, but I had the sense that Chris probably felt this more so than the rest of us." Tilbrook also said, "It's very Beatles-like and also has a similar sound to our song, 'The Knack'. There's a direct through line from 'The Knack' to 'I Think I'm Go Go', with that sense of other-worldness. The use of strings added to that feeling. I wanted to contrast real strings with synth strings and change the feel between the verses. This meant the listener got a sense of being jolted out of one mood or another."

== Critical opinion ==
AllMusic critic Stephen Thomas Erlewine said that "the group stretches into some spacy territory on "I Think I'm Go Go[.]"
