= Messed Around =

Single by Squeeze

from the album East Side Story
- Released: 1981 (US)
- Recorded: 1980
- Genre: Rock, new wave
- Length: 2:40
- Label: A&M
- Songwriter(s): Chris Difford, Glenn Tilbrook
- Producer(s): Roger Bechirian, Elvis Costello

Squeeze singles chronology
"Labelled with Love" (1981)	"Messed Around" (1981)	"Black Coffee in Bed" (1982)

"Messed Around" is a US single released from Squeeze's fourth album, East Side Story.

== Background ==
Author Jim Drury posed that the song was one which ex-Squeeze member Jools Holland may have enjoyed playing on, to which Glenn Tilbrook said, "Yeah. There was definitely a feeling of 'See what you're missing out on, Jools. Look at all the fun you could be having.' Paul [Carrack] did a great job on it and we recorded it virtually live in the studio." Tillbrook also said that the "song showed what a great band we had at the time, one of Squeeze's strongest line-ups."

Chris Difford said "it actually sounds like Jools [Holland] playing on it. It's a breathtaking solo by Paul. Piano playing does not get any better than that. When we recorded this I felt as though I'd finally arrived, that I was in a proper band with real men. Glenn's guitar sounds very Scotty Moore, with a distant amplifier. It's reminiscent of one of Glenn's earlier solos from when we were younger and a great way to end an album."

Tilbrook also claimed that the song was inspired by the Stray Cats.

Record World said that "Glenn Tilbrook's ultra-cool rockabilly inflections are supported by the band's tasteful piano sprinkles and guitar licks, creating an authentic late-'50s sound."

== Track listing ==
1. "Messed Around" (2:40)
2. "Yap Yap Yap" (4:13)
