= Satisfied (Squeeze song) =

Single by Squeeze

from the album Play
- Released: July 1991 (US promo), 4 November 1991 (UK)
- Genre: Rock
- Length: 4:33
- Label: Reprise
- Songwriters: Chris Difford and Glenn Tilbrook
- Producer: Tony Berg

Squeeze singles chronology
"Sunday Street" (1991)	"Satisfied" (1991)	"Crying in My Sleep" (1991)

"Satisfied" is the second single released from Squeeze's ninth album, Play, in the United Kingdom. It was released as a promotional single in the United States, where it reached number three on the Billboard Modern Rock Tracks chart. In the band's homeland, a full commercial single release failed to chart at all.

== Track listing ==
=== US promo CD ===
1. "Satisfied" (4:33)
2. "Satisfied (album version)" (5:09)

=== 7" vinyl and cassette ===
1. "Satisfied" (4:33)
2. "Happiness Is King" (4:01)

=== 12" vinyl and 5" CD ===
1. "Satisfied" (4:33)
2. "Happiness Is King" (4:01)
3. "Laughing in My Sleep" (4:07)
