= Christmas Day (Squeeze song) =

Single by Squeeze
- Released: 23 November 1979 (UK)
- Recorded: 1979
- Genre: New wave, holiday
- Length: 3:50
- Label: A&M
- Songwriter(s): Glenn Tilbrook and Chris Difford
- Producer(s): John Wood & Squeeze

Squeeze singles chronology
"Slap and Tickle" (1979)	"Christmas Day" (1979)	"Another Nail in My Heart" (1980)

back cover

"Christmas Day" was a holiday single released by Squeeze in 1979. The single was released only in the United Kingdom and failed to chart. The song itself was not included on an album, but appeared between the releases of Cool for Cats and Argybargy. It can, however, be found on the Japanese 2007 remaster of Cool for Cats along with its B-side.

== Track listing ==
1. "Christmas Day" (3:50)
2. "Going Crazy" (2:25)
