= Hits of the Year =

Single by Squeeze

from the album Cosi Fan Tutti Frutti
- Released: 1985 (US)
- Genre: Pop rock, new wave
- Length: 3:03
- Label: A&M
- Songwriter(s): Glenn Tilbrook and Chris Difford
- Producer(s): Laurie Latham

Squeeze singles chronology
"No Place Like Home" (1985)	"Hits of the Year" (1985)	"Heartbreaking World" (1985)

"Hits of the Year" is a U.S. single released from Squeeze's sixth album, Cosi Fan Tutti Frutti. The song describes a holiday flight interrupted by a hijacking. It charted only on the Billboard Top Rock Tracks chart, peaking at number 39.

Cash Box said it has "a straight ahead rhythm groove and typically elastic musical shadings."

== Track listing ==
1. "Hits of the Year" (3:03)
2. "The Fortnight Saga" (2:38)
