= Frank (Squeeze album) =

Studio album by Squeeze
- Released: 24 August 1989
- Studio: The Chocolate Factory and Nomis Studios (London, UK)
- Genre: Post-punk
- Length: 45:19
- Label: A&M
- Producer: Eric "ET" Thorngren; Glenn Tilbrook

Squeeze chronology
Babylon and On (1987)	Frank (1989)	A Round and a Bout (1990)

Singles from Frank
- 1. "If It's Love" Released: September 1989; 2. "Love Circles" Released: 15 January 1990

Professional ratings
Review scores
Source	Rating
AllMusic	3.5/5 stars
The Encyclopedia of Popular Music	3/5 stars
Hi-Fi News & Record Review	A:1
MusicHound Rock: The Essential Album Guide	1.5/5 stars
The Rolling Stone Album Guide	3.5/5 stars

Frank is a studio album by new wave group Squeeze, released in 1989. The album sold poorly, and Squeeze was dropped by A&M Records while on tour. Forced to take offers from different major labels for the first time in their career, the band soon signed with Reprise Records and began working on their next studio album, Play.

Frank peaked at number 58 in the UK Albums Chart. It peaked at No. 113 on the Billboard 200.

== Style ==
Susan Whitall of The Honolulu Advertiser described Frank as having a "typically Squeezian diversity of songs". The album was described as post-punk.

== Production ==
Frank was recorded live in the studio with producer Eric "E.T." Thorngren.

== Critical reception ==
Trouser Press called the album the band's best since Argybargy, writing: "Relocating its original magic with memorably inventive material and spirited delivery, Squeeze here seems exuberantly youthful, as if music-making had suddenly become fun again." Phoenix New Times wrote that Squeeze went "for a live garagey sound that finally gives [Gilson] Lavis' powerhouse drumming center-stage placement." The Rolling Stone Album Guide called the album "well-crafted" but "only occasionally involving."

== Track listing ==
All songs written by Chris Difford and Glenn Tilbrook except as indicated.

1. "Frank" (Public domain, no author) – 0:15
2. "If It's Love" – 4:02
3. "Peyton Place" – 4:08
4. "Rose I Said" – 3:36
5. "Slaughtered, Gutted and Heartbroken" – 4:37
6. "(This Could Be) The Last Time" – 3:49
7. "She Doesn't Have to Shave" – 3:27
8. "Love Circles" – 5:34
9. "Melody Motel" – 3:51
10. "Can of Worms" – 4:47
11. "Dr. Jazz" (Jools Holland) – 4:04
12. "Is It Too Late" – 3:12

=== Bonus tracks on 2007 CD reissue ===
13. "Red Light" (b-side of "Love Circles") (Merrill E. Moore) – 4:23
14. "Frank's Bag" (b-side of "If It's Love") (Chris Difford, Glenn Tilbrook, Julian Holland, Gilson Lavis, Keith Wilkinson) – 3:43
15. "Good Times Bring Me Down" (previously unreleased) – 5:14
16. "Any Other Day" (previously unreleased) – 3:42
17. "Who's That" (demo, b-side of "Love Circles") – 2:41
18. "If I'm Dead" (Glenn Tilbrook demo) – 2:14
19. "She Doesn't Have to Shave" (live, BBC Radio 1 Acoustic Session 19/10/1989) – 3:11
20. "Melody Motel" (live, BBC Radio 1 Acoustic Session 19/10/1989) – 3:52

== Personnel ==
Squeeze

- Chris Difford – guitars, backing vocals, lead vocals (5, 8)
- Glenn Tilbrook – keyboards, guitars, lead and backing vocals
- Jools Holland – acoustic piano, organ, backing vocals, lead vocals (11)
- Keith Wilkinson – basses, backing vocals
- Gilson Lavis – drums

Additional personnel

- Matt Irving – accordion (3, 9)
- Karen Beany, Monique Dyan and Barrie St. Johns – backing vocals (2)

Production

- Squeeze – arrangements
- Glenn Tilbrook – producer
- Eric "ET" Thorngren – producer, engineer, mixing
- Paul Tipler – assistant engineer
- Mark Willie – assistant engineer
- Stylorouge – design
- Chris Difford, Gilson Lavis, Glenn Tilbrook and Keith Wilkinson – portrait photography
- Trevor Rogers – front cover and inner sleeve photography
