= Crying in My Sleep =

Single by Squeeze

from the album Play
- Released: 1991
- Genre: Rock
- Length: 4:07
- Label: Reprise
- Songwriters: Glenn Tilbrook and Chris Difford
- Producer: Tony Berg

Squeeze singles chronology
"Satisfied" (1991)	"Crying in My Sleep" (1991)	"Cool for Cats" (1992)

"Crying in My Sleep" is the second single released from Squeeze's ninth album, Play, in the U.S. It was released only as a single-track, promotional CD, and reached number 14 on the Modern Rock Tracks chart.

== Track listing ==
1. "Crying in My Sleep" (4:07)
