= In Quintessence =

Song by Squeeze

from the album East Side Story
- Released: 15 May 1981
- Recorded: 1980–1981 Eden Studios, Chiswick, London
- Genre: Rock, new wave
- Length: 2:55
- Label: A&M
- Songwriter(s): Chris Difford, Glenn Tilbrook
- Producer(s): Dave Edmunds, assisted by Neil King

"In Quintessence" is the first song on Squeeze's 1981 album East Side Story. The lyrics were written by Chris Difford and the music by Glenn Tilbrook.

== Background ==
Chris Difford said, "The lyric is autobiographical in some ways, another song that mentions masturbation." When discussing the lyrics, Glenn Tilbrook said, "The bloke who the lyric was about is now a very responsible teacher working just outside Liverpool. I saw him a couple of months ago and he said how perfectly this described his life at the time. Chris was spot on in analysing him as someone who liked smoking joints and shagging birds, but what's wrong with that?"

Tilbrook stated, "Musically it was my tip of the hat to Elvis [Costello]. He'd borrowed the riff from 'Time Is Tight' and used it on a song called 'Temptation'. I thought it would be funny to use that riff again for 'In Quintessence' and expand it." The song also features a solo from Tilbrook, who recalled "working that solo out in the bathroom in the studio."

Although the rest of East Side Story was produced by Elvis Costello, this track was produced instead by Dave Edmunds. This is because East Side Story was originally intended to be a double album, with each side produced by a different producer; others intended for the task included Nick Lowe and possibly Paul McCartney.

== Live history ==
"In Quintessence" was often played live by Squeeze. Chris Difford said: "'In Quintessence' was in our set for quite a while and we used to segue it into 'Time Is Tight', which was a Booker T. & the M.G.'s song."

== Critical opinion ==
AllMusic critic Stephen Thomas Erlewine described it as "the almost ideal opener" and said that it "strangely enough sounds like [Elvis] Costello's 1981 album, Trust (it really was an incestuous scene)[.]" Another AllMusic critic, Stewart Mason, opined: "A quintessential (sorry) Squeeze song, 'In Quintessence' kicks off the band's masterpiece, 1981's East Side Story, in grand style." He went on to say that "[a]s in many of the best Squeeze songs, Glenn Tilbrook's choirboy chirp and Chris Difford's dry croak are used simultaneously throughout the song, a vocal trademark that's one of the group's most unique assets."
