= Farfisa Beat =

Single by Squeeze

from the album Argybargy
- B-side: "Here Comes That Feeling"
- Released: September 1980 (Denmark/Germany), February 1981 (Switzerland)
- Recorded: 1979
- Genre: Rock, new wave, power pop
- Length: 2:56
- Label: A&M
- Songwriter(s): Glenn Tilbrook and Chris Difford
- Producer(s): John Wood & Squeeze

Squeeze singles chronology
| "Pulling Mussels (From the Shell)" (1980) | "Farfisa Beat" (1980) | "Is That Love" (1981) |

"Farfisa Beat" is a song recorded and released by British new-wave band Squeeze. It was released as a single in Denmark and Germany in 1980, and Switzerland in 1981. The song appears on the band's third album, Argybargy.

== Background ==
Farfisa refers to the manufacturer of the electronic organ that gives this song its distinct sound. Musically, the song revolves around a guitar riff that Glenn Tilbrook composed. He said of the riff, "I was particularly pleased with that guitar riff, which is a minor point in its favor." Chris Difford compared the song's music to "a kind of B-52s, American club sound."

The band's opinion of the song was not high. In an interview, Tilbrook conceded that the song was a filler track. Chris Difford concluded that "the song's crap," explaining, "It's an album filler at best and one of the few which I don't remember recording at all. It was probably just stuck on the album because it was up-tempo."

== Reception ==
In his review of Argybargy Stephen Thomas Erlewine of AllMusic wrote, that Squeeze "can kick out agreeable throwaways like 'Farfisa Beat' without missing a step" and cited the song as an example of the band having "not yet left their rock & roll roots behind". Writer Jim Drury called it "filler."

== Track listing ==
1. Farfisa Beat (2:56)
2. Here Comes That Feeling (2:05)
