= This Summer =

1995 single by Squeeze

Single by Squeeze

from the album Ridiculous
- Released: 21 August 1995 (UK)
- Recorded: 1995
- Genre: Rock
- Length: 3:39
- Label: A&M
- Songwriters: Chris Difford and Glenn Tilbrook
- Producers: Squeeze & Peter Smith

Squeeze singles chronology
| "It's Over" (1994) | "This Summer" (1995) | "Electric Trains" (1995) |

"This Summer" is a song by Squeeze released as the first single from their eleventh album, Ridiculous.

Two versions of the single were released, each with entirely different B-sides. Disc 1 contained a live cover of Britpop group Blur's song "End of a Century". The single peaked at number 36 in the UK Singles Chart in September 1995. A remix reached number 32 in the UK Chart in August 1996.

== Critical reception ==
The editors for both the Washington Post and The Hamilton Spectator described "This Summer" as a "buoyant" song. The Independent stated the song was "an odd reverse homage which seeks to reclaim Squeeze's rightful place in the Cockney Brit-pop hierarchy", but also "the best track here". Newsday stated the single "is tailor-made for pop radio".

== Track listing ==
CD #1

1. "This Summer" (3:39)
2. "End of a Century (live)" (2:44)
3. "Periscope" (3:54)

CD #2

1. "This Summer" (3:39)
2. "Goodbye Girl (live)" (2:35)
3. "All the King's Horses" (4:08)

== 1996 remix and re-release ==
"This Summer (remix)"

Single by Squeeze

from the album Ridiculous
- Released: 12 August 1996 (UK)
- Recorded: ?
- Genre: Rock
- Length: 3:37
- Label: A&M
- Songwriters: Chris Difford and Glenn Tilbrook
- Producers: Peter Smith & Glenn Tilbrook

Squeeze singles chronology
| "Heaven Knows" (1996) | "This Summer (remix)" (1996) | "Down in the Valley" (1998) |

The remix was released as a UK single in 1996, almost a year after the original. The remix is extremely similar to the original mix, essentially just with a slightly more prominent drum track. This version charted marginally better than the original, peaking at #32; to date, this represents Squeeze's final appearance on any singles chart in any country.

Three versions of the single were released, each with a different set of B-sides.

=== Track listing ===
CD #1

1. "This Summer (remix)" (3:37)
2. "Electric Trains (Narrow Gauge mix)" (4:51)
3. "Heaven Knows" (3:42)
4. "This Summer" (3:38)

CD #2

1. "This Summer (remix)" (3:37)
2. "Cool for Cats" (3:12)
3. "Up the Junction" (3:11)
4. "Black Coffee in Bed" (6:09)

CD #3

1. "This Summer (remix)" (3:37)
2. "Sweet as a Nut" (3:41)
3. "In Another Lifetime" (3:35)
4. "Never There" (3:04)
