= Everything in the World =

Single by Squeeze

from the album Some Fantastic Place
- Released: 1993 (US)
- Recorded: 1993 (London)
- Genre: Rock
- Length: 4:30
- Label: A&M
- Songwriters: Glenn Tilbrook and Chris Difford
- Producers: Squeeze & Peter Smith

Squeeze singles chronology
"Third Rail" (1993)	"Everything in the World" (1993)	"Some Fantastic Place" (1993)

"Everything in the World" is a song by Squeeze. It was released in 1993 as the first single from their tenth album, Some Fantastic Place, in the United States and featured prominent falsetto vocals by British artist Chris Braide. "Third Rail" was the first single issued in most other countries. It was a hit in the U.S. on alternative rock radio, peaking at number nine on the Hot Modern Rock Tracks chart.

== Track listing ==
1. "Everything in the World" (4:30)
2. "Melody Motel" (live) (4:25)
3. "The Truth" (live) (5:05)
4. "Walk a Straight Line" (live) (4:11)
