= Difford & Tilbrook (album) =

Studio album by Difford & Tilbrook
- Released: July 1984
- Recorded: 1984
- Studio: Good Earth (London, UK); Solid Bond (London, UK)
- Genre: New wave
- Length: 38:12
- Label: A&M
- Producer: Tony Visconti, E.T. Thorngren, Difford & Tilbrook

Squeeze chronology
| Singles – 45's and Under (1982) | Difford & Tilbrook (1984) | Cosi Fan Tutti Frutti (1985) |

Singles from Difford & Tilbrook
- 1. "Love's Crashing Waves" Released: June 1984; 2. "Hope Fell Down" Released: September 1984; 3. "Picking Up the Pieces" Released: 1984 (US only)

Professional ratings
Review scores
| Source | Rating |
|---|---|
| AllMusic | 2.5/5 stars |
| Number One | 3/5 stars |
| The Rolling Stone Album Guide | 3/5 stars |
| Smash Hits | 6/10 |

Difford & Tilbrook is the only studio album released by Difford & Tilbrook. Chris Difford and Glenn Tilbrook were the main songwriters in the new wave band Squeeze until their 1982 breakup. The duo continued to write songs together, and in 1984 released this self-titled effort.

Because Chris Difford and Glenn Tilbrook have always been the songwriters and only constant members of Squeeze, Difford & Tilbrook is often considered to be a Squeeze album in all but name. Several remastered tracks from this album have been included on Squeeze compilations such as Piccadilly Collection and Excess Moderation (both released in 1996), and tracks "Hope Fell Down" and "Love's Crashing Waves" have regularly been included in Squeeze setlists since 2010. Tony Visconti produced the album, but A&M rejected his mix, and brought in Eric Thorngren to do a new mix.

== Background ==
Glenn Tilbrook had recently married Pam Baker who Difford disliked, and had become overly involved with certain aspects of the Difford & Tilbrook project; Difford reported that Baker had requested that she approve and amend his lyrics before she passed them on to Tilbrook. Both men also struggled with illegal substance abuse at the time, with Difford using cocaine and Tilbrook heroin.

== Track listing ==
All songs written by Difford and Tilbrook.

Side one

1. "Action Speaks Faster" – 4:50
2. "Love's Crashing Waves" – 3:08
3. "Picking Up the Pieces" – 3:18
4. "On My Mind Tonight" – 4:08
5. "Man for All Seasons" – 2:35

Side two

6. "Hope Fell Down" – 4:22
7. "Wagon Train" – 3:36
8. "You Can't Hurt the Girl" – 3:01
9. "Tears for Attention" – 4:50 (Produced by Eric "ET" Thorngren, Chris Difford and Glenn Tilbrook)
10. "The Apple Tree" – 4:24

== Personnel ==
- Chris Difford – guitar, backing vocals
- Glenn Tilbrook – guitar, keyboards, lead & backing vocals
- Keith Wilkinson – bass
- Debbie Bishop – backing vocals
- Andy Duncan – drums, percussion
- Guy Fletcher – keyboards, backing vocals
- Larry Tollfree – percussion
