= Third Rail (song) =

Single by Squeeze

from the album Some Fantastic Place
- Released: 12 July 1993 (UK)
- Recorded: 1993 (London)
- Genre: Power pop
- Length: 3:39
- Label: A&M
- Songwriters: Chris Difford and Glenn Tilbrook
- Producers: Squeeze & Peter Smith

Squeeze singles chronology
"Cool for Cats" (1992)	"Third Rail" (1993)	"Everything In The World" (1993)

"Third Rail" is the first single released from British rock band Squeeze's tenth album, Some Fantastic Place (1993). Released in July 1993 by A&M Records, it was the first Squeeze single to crack the Top 40 in the UK since 1987's "Hourglass", peaking at number 39.

== Track listing ==
- 7" vinyl and cassette
1. "Third Rail" (3:39)
2. "Cool For Cats (live medley)" (6:21)
- CD
1. "Third Rail" (3:39)
2. "Take Me I'm Yours (Paul Dakeyne remix)" (6:47)
3. "Cool For Cats (live medley)" (6:21)
- CD (digipak)
1. "Third Rail" (3:39)
2. "The Truth [live London, March 1993]" (5:05)
3. "Melody Motel [live London, March 1993]" (4:25)
4. "Walk A Straight Line [live London, May 1992]" (4:10)

== Charts ==
Chart (1993)	Peak position
UK Singles (OCC)	39
UK Airplay (Music Week)	36
