= Some Fantastic Place (song) =

Single by Squeeze

from the album Some Fantastic Place
- Released: 30 August 1993 (UK)
- Genre: Rock
- Length: 4:29
- Label: A&M
- Songwriters: Chris Difford and Glenn Tilbrook
- Producers: Squeeze & Peter Smith

Squeeze singles chronology
"Everything in the World" (1993)	"Some Fantastic Place" (1993)	"Loving You Tonight" (1993)

"Some Fantastic Place" is the third single released from Squeeze's tenth album of the same name, Some Fantastic Place. It peaked at number 73 on the UK Singles Chart.

The song is a tribute to Maxine Barker, a long-time friend of the band who had been responsible for first introducing Glenn Tilbrook and Chris Difford in the early 1970s and who died of leukemia in 1992. The song was described by Tilbrook as "one of those songs that wrote itself; it was done straight off in about 10 minutes." Tilbrook incorporated a guitar solo in the song that he wrote when he and Difford met in 1973. Both songwriters have stated multiple times that it is their favorite Squeeze song. The song shares some unusual chord changes with Roxy Music's mid-1970s hit, "Both Ends Burning". Tilbrook later claimed that the guitar solo was inspired by Jimi Hendrix.

The video for the song was filmed at Scotney Castle in Kent.

== Track listing ==
7" vinyl and cassette

1. "Some Fantastic Place" (4:29)
2. "Jumping" (4:18)

CD

1. "Some Fantastic Place" (4:29)
2. "Jumping" (4:18)
3. "Dark Saloons" (3:16)
4. "Discipline" (5:05)

CD (digipak)

1. "Some Fantastic Place" (4:29)
2. "Is That the Time?" (3:24)
3. "Don't Be a Stranger" (4:55)
4. "Stark Naked" (3:47)
