= Annie Get Your Gun (song) =

1982 single by Squeeze

Single by Squeeze

from the album Singles – 45's and Under
- Released: 8 October 1982 (UK)
- Recorded: 1982
- Genre: New wave
- Length: 3:22
- Label: A&M
- Songwriters: Chris Difford, Glenn Tilbrook
- Producer: Alan Tarney

Squeeze singles chronology
"I've Returned" (1982)	"Annie Get Your Gun" (1982)	"Last Time Forever" (1985)

"Annie Get Your Gun" is a single released by Squeeze in 1982. It was not featured on any studio album, but has been included on a number of compilations, including Singles – 45's and Under. "Annie Get Your Gun" (which borrows its title from a popular musical) was the last single released by the band before they broke up, though they reunited in 1985.

== Background ==
After the failure of the band's previous album, Sweets from a Stranger, Squeeze's record company, A&M, asked them to make a new single. Glenn Tilbrook already had put together two songs, "Action Speaks Faster" and "Annie Get Your Gun". He then asked the rest of the band to pick the one to be recorded, resulting in "Annie Get Your Gun" being unanimously chosen. The band was then sent to producer Alan Tarney, for whom Tilbrook played the song. When the band was brought back by Tarney they found the producer had already completed the backing track to the song, only needing Tilbrook and Chris Difford's vocals.

Glenn Tilbrook reflected on the song's recording, "It was like we were in The Monkees. Alan did a very good job, but it was devastating for us because we could all play so well, although I didn't mind as much as the others because I was singing the lead vocal." Drummer Gilson Lavis, however, was insistent that he record a drum track.

The song reached number 43 in the UK Singles Chart, but the song later gained fame as part of Squeeze's live set. The group performed "Annie Get Your Gun" on Saturday Night Live on 20 November 1982.

Difford said that he did not know what the song was about and was "not sure [he] care[s] about it very much either". He concluded, "It's not a great song, but a good vocal performance". The Los Angeles Times described the song as being "about the boisterous pleasures of rocking out". Cash Box said that "it’s the devil-may-care rhyme schemes of masters Difford and Tilbrook that make this song.

== Track listing ==
1. "Annie Get Your Gun" (3:22)
2. "Spanish Guitar" (2:38)

== Charts ==
Chart (1982–83)	Peak position
Australia (Kent Music Report)	52
United Kingdom (Official Charts Company)	43

== Live version ==
"Annie Get Your Gun (live)"

Single by Squeeze

from the album A Round and a Bout
- Released: April 1990 (US)
- Recorded: January 1990
- Genre: Rock
- Length: 3:24
- Label: I.R.S. & Deptford Fun City
- Songwriters: Chris Difford, Glenn Tilbrook
- Producers: Steve Forward & Glenn Tilbrook

Squeeze singles chronology
"Love Circles" (1990)	"Annie Get Your Gun (live)" (1990)	"Sunday Street" (1991)

"Annie Get Your Gun" (live) was released as a single in the US from Squeeze's live album, A Round and a Bout. The CD included the band's entire debut EP, Packet of Three, as bonus tracks.

== Track listing ==
1. "Annie Get Your Gun" (live) (3:24)
2. "Is It Too Late" (live) (3:22)
3. "Back Track" (2:21)
4. "Night Ride" (3:03)
5. "Cat on a Wall" (3:13)
