= Love Circles =

Single by Squeeze

from the album Frank
- Released: 15 January 1990 (UK)
- Recorded: 1989
- Genre: Pop rock
- Length: 4:25
- Label: A&M
- Songwriters: Chris Difford, Glenn Tilbrook
- Producers: Eric "ET" Thorngren & Glenn Tilbrook

Squeeze singles chronology
"If It's Love" (1989)	"Love Circles" (1990)	"Annie Get Your Gun (live)" (1990)

"Love Circles" is the second and final single released from Squeeze's eighth album, Frank. It featured a rare lead vocal turn by Squeeze lyricist Chris Difford – the only other Squeeze single on which Difford sang lead throughout the entire track was 1979's "Cool for Cats".

== Track listing ==
=== 7" vinyl ===
1. "Love Circles" — 4:25
2. "Red Light" (Merrill E. Moore) — 4:19

=== 12" vinyl and CD ===
1. "Love Circles" — 4:25
2. "Red Light" (Moore) — 4:19
3. "Who's That?" — 2:39

== Charts ==
Chart (1990)	Peak position
Italy Airplay (Music & Media)	8
