= Sunday Street (song) =

Single by Squeeze

from the album Play
- Released: July 1991 (UK)
- Recorded: ?
- Genre: Rock
- Length: 4:19
- Label: Reprise
- Songwriters: Chris Difford and Glenn Tilbrook
- Producer: Tony Berg

Squeeze singles chronology
"Annie Get Your Gun (live)" (1990)	"Sunday Street" (1991)	"Satisfied" (1991)

"Sunday Street" is a song by English rock band Squeeze, released by Reprise Records as the first single from their ninth album, Play (1991). Although the song was never a hit, the single's B-side, "Maidstone," remains extremely popular among fans and was a frequent live request. "Maidstone" was even included on the 1996 Squeeze compilation Excess Moderation, while "Sunday Street" has not appeared on any compilation album to date.

== Track listing ==
- 7" vinyl and cassette
1. "Sunday Street" (4:19)
2. "Maidstone" (3:35)
- 12" vinyl and CD
1. "Sunday Street" (4:19)
2. "Maidstone" (3:35)
3. "Mood Swings" (3:02)

== Charts ==
Chart (1991)	Peak position
UK Singles (OCC)	87
UK Airplay (Music Week)	40
