= Another Nail in My Heart =

Single by Squeeze

from the album Argybargy
- B-side: "Pretty Thing"
- Released: January 1980
- Recorded: 1979
- Genre: New wave; pop rock; post-punk; progressive pop
- Length: 2:55
- Label: A&M
- Songwriters: Chris Difford, Glenn Tilbrook
- Producers: John Wood, Squeeze

Squeeze singles chronology
| "Christmas Day" (1979) | "Another Nail in My Heart" (1980) | "If I Didn't Love You" (1980) |

Audio sample
- file; help

"Another Nail in My Heart" is a 1980 song by new wave band Squeeze. Written by Chris Difford and Glenn Tilbrook, it was released on the album Argybargy. Notable for Tilbrook's guitar solo right after the first verse, the song features marimba in its opening at the suggestion of newly acquired bassist John Bentley. Difford has expressed disappointment with his lyrics on the song, though he praised Tilbrook's solo.

The song has since received positive critical reviews, and charted in the United Kingdom and Canada. Squeeze has since included the song in their concert setlists and compilation albums.

== Background ==
"Another Nail in My Heart," according to Squeeze singer and guitarist Glenn Tilbrook, began as "another slow number" where he "had the melody line to start with and the band fleshed it out." Among these contributions was bassist John Bentley's suggestion to dub a marimba onto the song's intro. Bentley recalled, "I turned to Glenn and I said, 'That riff would sound really good if you overdubbed a marimba.' ... He just kinda looked at me and didn't say anything, ...so I didn't think any more about it. The next day, we came into the studio and I walked in and there was a classical set of marimbas!" Tilbrook claimed the song would have been "very ordinary" without the band's assistance.

The song is notable for its guitar solo, which is performed after the first verse. Tilbrook explained, "It took a whole afternoon to get the solo right and John Wood was very patient with me. I had a definite idea of how I wanted it to sound and he could see what I was after, although there was a lot of groping around in the dark." Difford praised Tilbrook's solo as "stunning" and "really thought through." Tilbrook also performs the Moog synthesizer on the song. Keyboardist Jools Holland's only contribution was the final piano arpeggio; in the official music video, he can be seen hauling his piano cross town while the band is already going, only to arrive at the studio just in time to make his "performance".

Chris Difford was dismissive of his contribution to the song, stating, "I don't think the lyric is much cop." He elaborated in his autobiography, "It was written quickly and has its roots in the constant flow of verses and choruses I was forced to produce, rather than in me unearthing any deep emotional thoughts."

== Music and lyrics ==
"Another Nail in My Heart" is two minutes and fifty-five seconds long. It was written by Squeeze members Chris Difford and Glenn Tilbrook, and it was produced by John Wood and Squeeze. AllMusic's Stephen Thomas Erlewine called it a "nervy breakup tune." In his review of the song, Stewart Mason wrote, "The topic, as usual, is a cocktail of lost love and heavy drinking, culminating in the memorable chorus 'And here in the bar, the piano man's found another nail for my heart.'"

Interestingly, the title "Another Nail in My Heart" is never directly used in the song's lyrics. Every time the main chorus appears, the word "in" is supplemented with the word "for."

== Release ==
The song was released as a single in January 1980 with the b-side "Pretty Thing." Later that year, it was released as the second track on Squeeze's full-length album, Argybargy. It has also been included on several of Squeeze's compilation albums, such as Singles – 45's and Under, Greatest Hits, and The Big Squeeze – The Very Best of Squeeze. The band re-recorded the song for the album Spot the Difference.

A music video for the song was also produced, featuring the band miming the song. Because Jools Holland does not perform on the song until its final piano flourish, Holland is featured in the video pushing a piano towards the building where the rest of the band is performing. At the end of the video, he reaches the building and plays the final arpeggio.

== Reception ==
=== Critical reception ===
"Another Nail in My Heart" received positive reviews from music critics. Cash Box called it a "upbeat, fresh pop/rock," with "witty lyrics, excellent pop ensemble playing (with a nod to the Beatles) and great vocals." Stephen Thomas Erlewine of AllMusic called the track a "pop classic of the new wave era", while the same site's Stewart Mason wrote that "it's one of Squeeze's finest singles, marrying one of Glenn Tilbrook's most memorably McCartneyesque melodies to a typically wry and clever Chris Difford lyric."

Robert Palmer of The New York Times described the song as an "ingenious pop-rock confection" John M. Borack wrote that it "made great use of Difford and Tilbrook's signature high register / low register harmonies." and fellow New York Times writer Jon Pareles cited it as one of Squeeze's "catchiest" songs. The Rough Guide to Rock called the song a "piece of pop mastery".

=== Chart performance ===
The song entered the UK Singles Chart at #65 on 1 March 1980. It stayed on the chart for nine weeks, peaking at number 17 on 29 March. In Canada, it was on the singles chart for 11 weeks and peaked at #56 on 28 June. In the United States, it was a hit on college radio but did not appear on the charts.

== Live performances ==
Squeeze performed the song at their concerts throughout the 1980s and 1990s. Glenn Tilbrook played the song at solo concerts in 2009 and 2011.

== Track listing ==
7"

1. "Another Nail in My Heart"
2. "Pretty Thing"

== Charts ==
| Chart (1980) | Peak position |
|---|---|
| UK Singles | 17 |
| Canadian Singles | 56 |
| US Dance Club Songs | 76 |
