= Argybargy =

Studio album by Squeeze
- Released: February 1980
- Recorded: August 1979–January 1980
- Studios: Olympic, London
- Genres: Power pop; new wave; pub rock; jangle pop
- Length: 36:14
- Label: A&M
- Producers: John Wood, Squeeze

Squeeze chronology
| Cool for Cats (1979) | Argybargy (1980) | East Side Story (1981) |

Singles from Argybargy
- 1. "Another Nail in My Heart" Released: January 1980; 2. "If I Didn't Love You" Released: March 1980 (US); 3. "Pulling Mussels (from the Shell)" Released: April 1980; 4. "Farfisa Beat" Released: September 1980 (DK/DE), February 1981 (CH)

Argybargy is the third studio album by the English new wave band Squeeze. Written and recorded after the band's successful sophomore release, Cool for Cats, the album's lyrics were written by Chris Difford while living with his wife in New York City. The band reunited with Cool for Cats producer John Wood and, after Glenn Tilbrook composed music for Difford's new lyrics, recorded the album in late 1979.

Argybargy was a commercial and critical success, reaching number 32 in the UK and becoming the first Squeeze album to chart in the US. The album has since been recognized as a classic of new wave and features multiple of the band's most famous songs, including "Another Nail in My Heart," "Pulling Mussels (from the Shell)," and "If I Didn't Love You." This would be the final Squeeze studio album to feature founding member Jools Holland until Cosi Fan Tutti Frutti (1985). Holland would leave in early 1981 to pursue a solo career.

== Background ==
Following the commercial success of the band's previous album, Cool for Cats, as well as a successful international tour, Squeeze reached its highest level of success to that point. This level of fame and recognition began to take its toll; Glenn Tilbrook worried of becoming "too big for [his] boots" and struggled with being recognized in public. He recalled,

"I was standing in [a pub] in Blackheath with my mates when I became conscious of the fact that a lot of people were looking at me. ... I had to get out. I'd never experienced anything like it before and it was a horrible feeling. As much as I wanted to be successful and famous, I wasn't as comfortable with fame as I'd thought."

Following the Cool for Cats tour, Chris Difford married and spent the summer of 1979 in the US with his wife. There he wrote over 40 new lyrics, inspired by his new marriage and his time spent in Greenwich Village. He recalled, "I would sit in the flat all day while [wife] Cindy went to work and this fluidity of lyricism came gushing forth. The whole of the Argybargy album came in one fell swoop and lots more besides that never saw the light of day."

== Recording ==
When asked by A&M Records to produce a third album, the band brought back Cool for Cats producer John Wood and Tilbrook composed music for the best of Difford's new lyrics. The album was recorded during the tail end of 1979.

Argybargy would be the last Squeeze album featuring founding member Jools Holland until Squeeze's first reunion album, 1985's Cosi Fan Tutti Frutti. Difford recalled, "He was becoming less and less involved at this time. I think he was getting frustrated that he wasn't getting more of a shout in the band, but by then he was spending less time thinking about being in the band and more about his career." Holland would release a solo album before moving to a television career.

== Title ==
The album was titled Argybargy, a British expression that Difford said "sums up succinctly what our lives were like at the time. We were in each other's pockets, travelling in a minibus and on Freddie Laker planes. It was getting tiring, but we lived on the adrenalin of it."

Because the titular expression is not used in America, band manager Miles Copeland opposed the album name. Difford recalled, "Miles told us no one would know what it meant but we didn't give a shit and were in a belligerent, young Englishmen's mood, so we kept it."

== Reception ==
Professional ratings
Review scores
| Source | Rating |
|---|---|
| AllMusic | 5/5 stars |
| Christgau's Record Guide | B− |
| Encyclopedia of Popular Music | 4/5 stars |
| Mojo | 4/5 stars |
| Record Collector | 4/5 stars |
| Record Mirror | 3/5 stars |
| The Rolling Stone Album Guide | 4/5 stars |
| Smash Hits | 9/10 |
| Sounds | 4.5/5 stars |
| Uncut | 9/10 |

Argybargy was released in February 1980. It spent 15 weeks on the UK Albums Chart, peaking at number 32. Argybargy was the first Squeeze album to chart in the US, reaching number 71 on the Billboard 200. On the Billboard dance chart, all cuts from Argybargy jointly peaked at number 76, and spent 6 weeks on that listing, in the summer of 1980.

Argybargy has seen critical acclaim from music writers. Chris Jones of BBC Music called the album "their crowning achievement" and "a masterpiece of kitchen sink pop," concluding, "If you're going to own at least one Squeeze album, this has to be the one." Stephen Thomas Erlewine of AllMusic wrote, "Argybargy doesn't stay in one place; it's restless and crackling with colors... with Argybargy it was clear that Squeeze were at the top of the pack among new wave popsters, and that their sardonic yet lively voice was unique among any pop group before or since."

=== Accolades ===
Paste listed Argybargy as the 20th best new wave album, calling it the band's "first truly great" album and concluding, "Clever, infectious, with genuine emotion lying just below the surface—it's everything a great New Wave record should be." Music journalist John M. Borack ranked Argybagy at number 58 on his list of "The 200 Greatest Power Pop Albums" in his book Shake Some Action: The Ultimate Guide to Power Pop.

== Track listing ==
The track listing below is from the original UK LP release. On the American release, the song order was changed slightly, with "If I Didn't Love You" moved up to the first track of the second side, but the order otherwise remaining the same.

All tracks are written by Chris Difford and Glenn Tilbrook, except where noted.

Side one
| No. | Title | Length |
|---|---|---|
| 1. | "Pulling Mussels (from the Shell)" | 3:58 |
| 2. | "Another Nail in My Heart" | 2:56 |
| 3. | "Separate Beds" | 3:21 |
| 4. | "Misadventure" | 2:56 |
| 5. | "I Think I'm Go Go" | 4:18 |

Side two
| No. | Title | Writer(s) | Length |
|---|---|---|---|
| 1. | "Farfisa Beat" | | 2:57 |
| 2. | "Here Comes That Feeling" | | 2:12 |
| 3. | "Vicky Verky" | | 3:12 |
| 4. | "If I Didn't Love You" | | 4:11 |
| 5. | "Wrong Side of the Moon" | Jools Holland, Difford | 2:25 |
| 6. | "There at the Top" | | 3:46 |

Bonus tracks (1997 reissue)
| No. | Title | Length |
|---|---|---|
| 1. | "Funny How It Goes" | 3:49 |
| 2. | "Go" | 4:12 |

=== 2008 deluxe edition ===
Argybargy was re-issued in 2008 as a two disc deluxe edition. The first disc includes the original album, the two bonus cuts from the 1997 reissue, and seven additional bonus tracks.

1. "What the Butler Saw" ("Pulling Mussels" b-side) – 2:46
2. "Someone Else's Heart" (Previously Unreleased Version) – 2:55
3. "Pretty One" ("Another Nail in My Heart" b-side) – 2:46
4. "Going Crazy" ("Christmas Day" b-side) – 3:56
5. "Farfisa Beat" (Previously Unreleased Alternate Version) – 2:58
6. "Library Girl" (Demo) – 3:17
7. "If I Didn't Love You" (Glenn Tilbrook Demo) – 3:39

The second disc contains a concert recorded at the Hammersmith Odeon on 9 March 1980, plus a US radio commercial for the album.

1. Radio Commercial – 1:05
2. "Slap and Tickle" – 3:54
3. "Touching Me Touching You" – 2:07
4. "Slightly Drunk" – 2:40
5. "Pulling Mussels (From the Shell)" – 3:44
6. "Hop Skip and Jump"
7. "Funny How It Goes" – 3:18
8. "Another Nail in My Heart" – 2:55
9. "Cool for Cats" – 3:46
10. "Mess Around" – 2:37
11. "I Think I'm Go Go" – 4:55
12. "Take Me I'm Yours"
13. "If I Didn't Love You" – 3:54
14. "Strong in Reason" – 4:06
15. "Misadventure"
16. "It's So Dirty" – 3:02
17. "Goodbye Girl" – 4:14
18. "Up the Junction" – 3:03
19. "There at the Top"
20. "Going Crazy" – 4:59

== Personnel ==
Squeeze

- Chris Difford – rhythm guitars, vocals, lead vocals on "Here Comes That Feeling", co-lead vocals on "If I Didn't Love You" & "I Think I'm Go Go"
- Glenn Tilbrook – keyboards, lead guitars, lead vocals
- Jools Holland – keyboards, vocals, lead vocals on "Wrong Side of the Moon"
- John Bentley – bass
- Gilson Lavis – drums

with:

- Del Newman – string arrangements

Production

- John Wood – producer, mixing
- Andrew Lumm – engineer
- Squeeze – mixing
- Frank DeLuna – mastering at A&M Studios (Hollywood, California, USA)
- Michael Ross – art direction, design
- Mike Laye – front cover photography

== Certifications ==
Certifications for Argybargy
| Region | Level | Date |
|---|---|---|
| Canada (CRIA) | Gold | 1 October 1981 |
