= Cosi Fan Tutti Frutti =

Studio album by Squeeze
- Released: 26 August 1985
- Recorded: 1985
- Studio: ICP Studios, Brussels; The Power Plant, North London; The Workhouse, South London
- Genre: New wave, post-punk
- Length: 44:06
- Label: A&M
- Producer: Laurie Latham

Squeeze chronology
Difford & Tilbrook (1984)	Cosi Fan Tutti Frutti (1985)	Babylon and On (1987)

Singles from Cosi Fan Tutti Frutti
- 1. "Last Time Forever" Released: June 1985; 2. "No Place Like Home" Released: September 1985; 3. "Hits of the Year" Released: 1985 (US only); 4. "Heartbreaking World" Released: October 1985; 5. "By Your Side" Released: 1985; 6. "King George Street" Released: April 1986

Cosi Fan Tutti Frutti is the sixth studio album by the British new wave group Squeeze, and the first recorded since their breakup in 1982. It reunited songwriters Glenn Tilbrook and Chris Difford with drummer Gilson Lavis and keyboardist Jools Holland (now credited as "Julian"). Keith Wilkinson, who played bass on the 1984 Difford & Tilbrook album, joined Squeeze for the first time. He would stay with the band for over a decade, making him the longest-lasting bassist in Squeeze's history. Laurie Latham produced the album. The album peaked at number 31 on the UK Albums Chart.

The album's title is a play on words, combining the name of the Mozart Italian-language opera Così fan tutte with the name of the Italian confection tutti-frutti (also the name of a Little Richard song). The album's cover art expands this into a visual pun, with a picture of a tea cozy (cosi), a fan, and a tutti-frutti dessert.

In 1997, the CD was released in the UK with two bonus tracks, as part of the Six of One... box set. The set included the band's first six studio albums, each digitally remastered. These CDs were made available for purchase in 1998.

== Reception ==
Professional ratings
Review scores
Source	Rating
AllMusic	3/5 stars
Smash Hits	9/10 stars

Chris Woodstra of AllMusic summarised Cosi Fan Tutti Frutti as "flawed but worthwhile," commenting that although "history and a dated production style haven't been particularly kind to the album," the end result was "not without its merits".

In Smash Hits, Ian Cranna said the production introduced "harsh crashing rhythms, lot of echoes" to create "a highly unorthodox, aggressive musical challenge. The killer touch is Difford's unsparingly detailed lyrics about drink, violence and other emotional problems which make a grimly powerful complement for the music."

== Track listing ==
All songs written by Chris Difford and Glenn Tilbrook except as indicated. The time listed in parentheses indicates the version used on the 1997 remaster.

1. "Big Beng" – 4:04 (4:03)
2. "By Your Side" – 4:24 (4:24)
3. "King George Street" – 3:48 (3:48)
4. "I Learnt How to Pray" – 4:47 (4:24)
5. "Last Time Forever" – 6:26 (5:41)
6. "No Place Like Home" – 4:27 (4:27)
7. "Heartbreaking World" (Difford, Jools Holland) – 5:27 (5:07)
8. "Hits of the Year" – 3:03 (3:03)
9. "Break My Heart" – 4:52 (4:34)
10. "I Won't Ever Go Drinking Again (?)" – 5:07 (4:38)

=== Bonus tracks (1997 reissue) ===
11. "Love's a Four Letter Word" – 3:41
12. "The Fortnight Saga" – 2:41

== Personnel ==
Squeeze

- Chris Difford – guitars, backing vocals, lead vocals (9)
- Glenn Tilbrook – guitars, tambourine, lead and backing vocals
- Jools Holland – keyboards, backing vocals, lead vocals (7)
- Keith Wilkinson – bass, backing vocals
- Gilson Lavis – drums, electronic drums, backing vocals

Additional personnel

- Ian Kewley – E-mu Emulator (7)
- Christopher Holland – organ (7)
- Hearts of Soul – backing vocals (4)

Production

- Laurie Latham – producer, engineer
- Erwin Autrique – additional engineer
- Michel Dierickx – additional engineer
- Frank DeLuna – remastering at A&M Mastering Studios (Hollywood, California, US)
- Rob O'Connor – art direction, design
- Michael Ross – art direction
- Simon Fell – illustration
- Nick Knight – group photography
- Trevor Rogers – inner sleeve photography

== Charts ==
Chart performance for Cosi Fan Tutti Frutti
Chart (1985–1986)	Peak position
Australian Albums (Kent Music Report)	97
UK Albums (OCC)	31
