= Pulling Mussels (from the Shell) =

"Pulling Mussels (From the Shell)"

Single by Squeeze

from the album Argybargy
- B-side: "What The Butler Saw"
- Released: 9 May 1980
- Recorded: 1979
- Genre: Power pop; jangle pop; new wave
- Length: 3:58
- Label: A&M
- Songwriters: Chris Difford, Glenn Tilbrook
- Producers: John Wood, Squeeze

Squeeze singles chronology
"If I Didn't Love You" (1980)	"Pulling Mussels (From the Shell)" (1980)	"Farfisa Beat" (1980)

Audio sample
- file; help

"Pulling Mussels (From the Shell)" is a song by the British band Squeeze. First released on the 1980 album Argybargy, it received positive critical reviews, peaked at No. 44 on the UK Singles Chart, and became one of Squeeze's most popular songs. The song is about singer and guitarist Chris Difford's experiences at a holiday camp.

== Background ==
The song "Pulling Mussels" was written by band members Chris Difford and Glenn Tilbrook.

The song's chorus was partly inspired by The Tubes, with whom Squeeze had toured throughout 1979. Tilbrook has stated that "The end part of the chorus has an unusual turnaround, and that’s the culmination of hearing White Punks on Dope, which is quite grandiose. The Tubes didn’t play the sort of rock that we would do, but their approach sunk in subconsciously."

The song features a piano solo by keyboardist Jools Holland. This is preceded by a guitar solo from Glenn Tilbrook, who said of this solo, "I think that's an obstinate (sic) solo—just to stick on one note for half the solo. That’s my personality all over. ... It's like a series of false starts."

The lyrics are based on Difford's own experiences. Rob Sachs interviewed Difford and wrote that the song "is about a memory he has from his time spent at a British holiday camp in, a budget resort type of place that includes basic accommodations, entertainment, and other facilities." Difford came up with the song title "one fine day writing the words in a New York apartment". According to critic Chris Woodstra, it is an "observation of the British working class" and "offers a series of detailed snapshots of the different walks of life on a seaside holiday in Leysdown-on-Sea."

The lines "They do it down on Camber Sands / They do it at Waikiki" refer to a dune system in East Sussex, England, and the Honolulu, Hawaii beach, respectively. The phrase "pulling mussels" was created by Difford and refers to the use of fingers to stimulate the female sexual organs.

== Release ==
"Pulling Mussels" was the first track on Squeeze's album Argybargy, released in February 1980. The 7" single was released in April 1980 with the B-side "What the Butler Saw."

The song has also been included on several of Squeeze's compilation albums, such as Singles – 45's and Under, Greatest Hits, and The Big Squeeze – The Very Best of Squeeze. It was re-recorded for the 2010 album Spot the Difference. A live version was included on A Round and a Bout.

== Reception ==
=== Critical reception ===
"Pulling Mussels" received positive reviews from music critics. It has been variously described as "a timeless cult classic", "a brilliant slice of pop genius", "a pop classic of the new wave era", and "a piece of pop mastery". In 2007, Anna Borg wrote, "The build up before the chorus always gets me, even 25 years later." AllMusic's Stephen Thomas Erlewine described the song as "a vivid portrait of a seaside vacation where Difford's vignettes are made all the more vivid by Tilbrook's bright, invigorating pop." Cash Box called it "one of the most refreshing pop tunes to come out in some time." Record World called it a "challenging yet totally consumable pop-rock [tune]...with stunning guitar/keyboard breaks." It is regarded as one of Squeeze's catchiest songs.

=== Chart performance ===
The single debuted on the UK chart at No. 52 on 10 May 1980. It stayed on the chart for six weeks, peaking at No. 44 on 24 May.

Though the song did not chart in the United States, it became a hit on the country's college radio stations and in new wave clubs.

== Live performances ==
"Pulling Mussels" is a "crowd favorite" at Squeeze concerts, and as of September 2020, it is the band's most played song in concert. The band performed the song on Saturday Night Live on 20 November 1982. In 2001, it was the finale of a Glenn Tilbrook show in Cambridge, Massachusetts, United States. Squeeze performed "Pulling Mussels" as their encore on their 2010 tour.

== Track listing ==
7-inch vinyl

1. "Pulling Mussels (From the Shell)"
2. "What the Butler Saw"

== Charts ==
Chart (1980)	Peak position
UK Singles	44
