= Slap and Tickle =

"Slap And Tickle"

Single by Squeeze

from the album Cool for Cats
- Released: 31 August 1979 (UK)
- Recorded: 1978
- Genre: New wave
- Length: 4:19
- Label: A&M
- Songwriter(s): Chris Difford and Glenn Tilbrook
- Producer(s): John Wood & Squeeze

Squeeze singles chronology
"Up the Junction" (1979)	"Slap And Tickle" (1979)	"Christmas Day" (1979)

"Slap And Tickle" was the fourth and final single released from Squeeze's second album, Cool for Cats. Co-written by Chris Difford and Glenn Tilbrook, the song took influence lyrically from the crowd that the band had been associating with at the time. Its synth-heavy arrangement was inspired by Kraftwerk and Giorgio Moroder.

"Slap and Tickle" was released as the fourth single from Cool for Cats, reaching number 24 in the UK.

== Background ==
"Slap and Tickle" was co-written by Chris Difford and Glenn Tilbrook. On "Slap and Tickle", Difford took lyrical inspiration from the "seedy crew" that the band had become friendly with when they became successful. Difford explained, "I loved being with them because they were the kind of people I'd shied away from at school. Now I had the authority of being in a successful band, I was hanging out with them." Difford also cited the lyrical style of Ian Dury and future Squeeze producer Elvis Costello as influences in developing the song's rhythmic metre. "Slap and tickle" is a British euphemism for sexual activity.

Musically, Tilbrook cited Kraftwerk and Giorgio Moroder as inspirations on "Slap and Tickle", though his inexperience with sequencers made it difficult to replicate the sound. He noted, "I played it all by hand. There's a clip of me on the Old Grey Whistle Test prodding away manfully at the keyboard." Tilbrook played keyboard on the song, which he later noted was him "encroaching on Jools [Holland]'s territory."

== Release ==
"Slap and Tickle" appeared as the opening track on 1979's Cool for Cats. The track was released as the fourth single from the album in the UK. The single peaked at number 24 in the UK Singles Chart.

The song has since appeared on compilation albums, such as 1982's Singles – 45's and Under. A rerecorded version of "Slap and Tickle" also appeared on the 2010 album Spot the Difference.

== Track listing ==
1. "Slap And Tickle" (4:19)
2. "All's Well" (2:25)
