= Play (Squeeze album) =

Studio album by Squeeze
- Released: July 1991
- Studio: Real World (Box, UK); Helicon Mountain (Blackheath, London); Zeitgeist (Los Angeles, California); Ocean Way (Hollywood, California)
- Genre: Pop rock
- Length: 52:25
- Label: Reprise
- Producer: Tony Berg

Squeeze chronology
A Round and a Bout (1990)	Play (1991)	Some Fantastic Place (1993)

Singles from Play
- 1. "Sunday Street" Released: July 1991; 2. "Satisfied" Released: July 1991 (US Promo), 4 November 1991 (UK); 3. "Crying in My Sleep" Released: 1991

Play is a 1991 album by the British new wave group Squeeze. It is the band's ninth album, and their only released by Reprise Records. It is the first LP in the Squeeze discography to feature only four official members instead of five (Steve Nieve took on many of the keyboard duties that would have gone to Jools Holland in the past). Tony Berg produced the album. In the liner notes to the 1996 Squeeze compilation Excess Moderation, Glenn Tilbrook stated that he considers Play the beginning of Squeeze's "renaissance period." The album spent one week at number 41 in the UK Albums Chart in September 1991.

The liner notes to the album are, appropriately, in the form of a play that incorporates the lyrics of the songs in a script that also references the plays Our Town by Thornton Wilder and Waiting for Godot by Samuel Beckett.

== Recording ==
Play was recorded in Greenwich, London at WoodWharf Studios.

== Critical reception ==
Professional ratings
Review scores
Source	Rating
AllMusic	4/5 stars
NME	7/10

Play received some positive reception from critics. Stewart Mason of AllMusic proclaimed the record to be "probably Squeeze's best post-reunion album", naming the tracks "The Truth" and "Walk a Straight Line" as "particular highlights".

== Track listing ==
All songs written by Chris Difford and Glenn Tilbrook.

1. "Satisfied" – 5:10
2. "Crying in My Sleep" – 5:03
3. "Letting Go" – 5:01
4. "The Day I Get Home" – 4:50
5. "The Truth" – 4:12
6. "House of Love" – 3:23
7. "Cupid's Toy" – 4:31
8. "Gone to the Dogs" – 3:54
9. "Walk a Straight Line" – 3:50
10. "Sunday Street" – 4:16
11. "Wicked and Cruel" – 4:14
12. "There Is a Voice" – 4:01

== Personnel ==
Squeeze

- Chris Difford – guitars, backing vocals
- Glenn Tilbrook – keyboards, acoustic guitar, electric guitar, lead and backing vocals
- Keith Wilkinson – bass, backing vocals
- Gilson Lavis – drums, percussion

Additional musicians

- Tony Berg – keyboards, guitars
- Bruce Hornsby – accordion
- Matt Irving – acoustic piano, organ, accordion
- Steve Nieve – acoustic piano, organ, harpsichord
- Dan Higgins, Larry Williams, Bill Reichenbach Jr., Gary Grant and Jerry Hey – horns
- John Acevedo, Bob Becker, Larry Corbett, Joel Derouin, Armen Garabedian, Berj Garabedian, Suzie Katayama and Sid Page – strings
- Claudia Fontaine – backing vocals (4, 10)
- Beverly Skeete – backing vocals (4, 10)
- Laurence Johnson – backing vocals (7)
- Paul Lee – backing vocals (7)

Choir on "The Day I Get Home"

- Blanche Black, Mary Jo Braun, Wendie Colter, Christopher Guest, Gabriele Morgan, Michael McKean, Michael Penn, Betsy Petrie and Steven Soles

Production

- Squeeze – arrangements
- Tony Berg – producer, arrangements
- Chris Lord-Alge – basic track recording
- Ken Jordan – overdub recording
- Steve Reincoff – overdub recording
- Bob Clearmountain – mixing
- Ronnie Box – recording assistant
- Chris Lawson – recording assistant
- Terry Medhurst – recording assistant
- Kim Champagne – art direction
- Jeff Gold – art direction
- Enrique Badulescu – photography
- Miles Copeland III – management
- John Lay – management
