= Black Coffee in Bed =

Single by Squeeze

from the album Sweets from a Stranger
- Released: 9 April 1982 (UK)
- Recorded: 1981
- Genre: Blue-eyed soul
- Length: 6:12
- Label: A&M
- Songwriters: Chris Difford and Glenn Tilbrook
- Producers: Squeeze & Phil McDonald

Squeeze singles chronology
"Messed Around" (1981)	"Black Coffee in Bed" (1982)	"When the Hangover Strikes" (1982)

"Black Coffee in Bed" is the first single released from Squeeze's fifth album, Sweets from a Stranger. It peaked at number 51 in the UK Singles Chart in April 1982.

== Background ==
Chris Difford stated, "[t]he lyric was inspired by my picking up my notebook one day and seeing a coffee stain on it, which inspired the first line. It was a very vivid image for me and inspired this song of loss and regret." Difford also said that "lyrically it was attractive to [a country] kind of metre. The fact that Glenn put a soul melody to it shows the unique quality of our writing."

A music video, which Difford said showed the band "look[ing] totally out of place and not credible at all," was directed by Steve Barron (notable for directing Michael Jackson's "Billie Jean" video). The video for the song implies that Difford played the guitar solo, when it was in fact performed by Glenn Tilbrook. The video also implies that the backing vocals were performed by members of Squeeze, but backing vocals on "Black Coffee in Bed" were actually performed by guests Paul Young and Elvis Costello. Tillbrook stated that "[t]he backing vocals by Elvis [Costello] and Paul Young were the icing on the cake."

Of the song's guitar solo, Tilbrook stated, "It’s sort of a very 1960s, Motown-influenced solo. But I love the idea of a key change for the solo. And also for it to be quite jazzy, which the song wasn't."

== Reception ==
=== Critical reception ===
AllMusic critic Stephen Thomas Erlewine said that Sweets from a Stranger peaked "with the sublime "Black Coffee in Bed"—a post-breakup tune that could have easily slid onto East Side Story." Trouser Press wrote that the band's "upbeat overhaul" had transformed the "plodding 'Black Coffee in Bed' into a marvelous jolt of pop soul."

Chris Difford stated, "We always thought we recorded [the song] too slow," and Glenn Tillbrook said, "It could never be a fast song, but it certainly had the opportunity to be slightly perkier."

=== Chart performance ===
When the song was released as a single, it peaked at number 51 on the UK Singles Chart, as well as number 103 on the US Bubbling Under the Hot 100 chart and number 26 on the US Mainstream Rock Chart. The single was the only one from Sweets from a Stranger to chart.

== Track listing ==
1. "Black Coffee in Bed" (6:12)
2. "The Hunt" (3:52)
