= Labelled with Love =

Single by Squeeze

from the album East Side Story
- Released: 25 September 1981 (UK)
- Recorded: 1980
- Genre: Country; new wave
- Length: 4:44
- Label: A&M
- Songwriters: Glenn Tilbrook, Chris Difford
- Producers: Roger Bechirian, Elvis Costello

Squeeze singles chronology
"Tempted" (1981)	"Labelled with Love" (1981)	"Messed Around" (1981)

Music video
- "Labelled With Love" at TopPop on YouTube

"Labelled with Love" is a song by Squeeze, released as the third single from the band's fourth album, East Side Story. It was the last Squeeze single to reach the top 10 on the UK Singles Chart, peaking at number 4 in 1981. The song was written by Glenn Tilbrook and Chris Difford. Live versions of the track appeared on the live albums, A Round and a Bout (1990) and Live at the Royal Albert Hall (1999).

Difford and Tilbrook used the title in a 1983 musical.

The B-side "Squabs on Forty Fab" is a medley of previous Squeeze hits.

== Critical reception ==
Bryan Wawzenek of Diffuser compiled a list of country songs by alternative, indie and punk artists. He proclaimed "Labelled with Love" to adorn both musical and lyrical "country hallmarks", with themes pertaining to "drinking and heartbreak" and instrumentation of "moseying beat and Nashville piano."

== Track listing ==
1. "Labelled with Love" (4:44)
2. "Squabs on Forty Fab" (4:45)

== Charts ==
Chart (1981)	Peak position
Ireland (IRMA)	2
Netherlands (Single Top 100)	46
UK Singles (OCC)	4
