= East Side Story (Squeeze album) =

Studio album by Squeeze
- Released: 15 May 1981
- Recorded: 1980–1981
- Studio: Eden, London
- Genre: Pop rock; new wave; art pop; power pop; progressive pop; sophisti-pop
- Length: 49:03
- Label: A&M
- Producer: Elvis Costello; Roger Béchirian

Squeeze chronology
Argybargy (1980)	East Side Story (1981)	Sweets from a Stranger (1982)

Singles from East Side Story
- 1. "Is That Love" Released: 1 May 1981; 2. "Tempted" Released: 10 July 1981; 3. "Labelled with Love" Released: 25 September 1981; 4. "Messed Around" Released: 1981 (US only)

East Side Story is the fourth studio album by new wave group Squeeze. The album peaked at number 19 in the UK Albums Chart, spending 26 weeks in the listing.

The album marked a shift from the new wave sound of their earlier work, as it contained songs influenced by rockabilly, R&B, blue-eyed soul, Merseybeat, and psychedelia among other genres. It also contained Squeeze's last top 10 UK single, "Labelled with Love". It was the first album to feature new keyboardist Paul Carrack formerly of Ace, replacing Jools Holland who had departed in early 1981. He sang lead on the track "Tempted", which became Squeeze's first U.S. chart hit. Shortly after the release of this album, Carrack left the band for a solo career, but he returned to Squeeze for a time in the early 1990s, playing and singing on the Some Fantastic Place album.

In the UK, East Side Story was reissued on CD in 1997 with two album outtakes, as part of the band's Six of One... box set. The set included the band's first six studio albums, all digitally remastered. A year later, each separate CD (including the expanded East Side Story) was made available for individual purchase. In 2007, the album was digitally remastered and released in Japan. It contained two extra bonus tracks, both taken from B-sides from the album's singles; "Trust" and "Yap, Yap, Yap".

== Recording ==
The initial concept for the album, proposed by manager Jake Riviera, was for Squeeze to record a double album with one side produced by Elvis Costello, another by Dave Edmunds, a third by Nick Lowe and the fourth by Paul McCartney. Although all producers were willing, the logistical difficulty of assembling the four producers ultimately made the plan impossible. In the end, the album was narrowed down to a single disc and was largely produced by Costello and Roger Bechirian, though Dave Edmunds produced the opening track, "In Quintessence".

In the studio, Costello, in the line of his longtime producer Nick Lowe, served more as a creative advisor while Bechirian handled the technical aspect of production. Bechirian explained, "Elvis sat there and pontificated a lot about this, that, and the other and I got on with getting the stuff down and rallying the band. I mean, Elvis did have an influence to some extent, but it wasn't that great". Chris Difford spoke glowingly of Costello's influence, saying, "I was in complete awe of working with him. It was a great challenge to come in every day with a lyric that would be better than the one he might come up with. ... I could tell which were the weak ones just by looking at his face". Costello later recorded a version of the album's "Someone Else's Heart" for a yet-to-be-compiled Squeeze tribute album in the 2010s.

The album was halfway completed when John Lennon was assassinated on 8 December 1980. The band were in the studio at the time; Difford recalled, "We went into the studio and a dozen or so musicians just dropped in. We cracked some beers and just played John Lennon songs the whole day. It was highly emotional".

== Music ==
Simru Sonmez-Erbil opined that East Side Story was "more blended with their post-punk sound" and that it "demonstrated the band's ability to make any musical styling work". The album saw the band diverging from their traditional new wave sound and integrating elements of progressive rock, psychedelia, rockabilly, soul and Western.

== Reception ==
Professional ratings
Review scores
Source	Rating
AllMusic	5/5 stars
Encyclopedia of Popular Music	5/5 stars
Record Mirror	5/5 stars
Rolling Stone	4/5 stars
The Rolling Stone Album Guide	4/5 stars
Smash Hits	9/10
Uncut	10/10
The Village Voice	B+

Upon its release, East Side Story was praised by contemporary critics in the British music press. Smash Hits Ian Cranna gave the album a 9 out of 10 rating, praising the songwriting partnership of Chris Difford and Glenn Tilbrook and the musical diversity, and Record Mirror's Mike Nicholls was similarly impressed, giving it a full five star rating. Colin McEnroe of the Hartford Courant called East Side Story a "fun" album that "eludes complete comprehension after 15 or 20 listens."

In 1989, the Toronto Star music critics took a look over the albums they had reviewed in the past four years to include in a list based on "commercial impact to social import, to strictly musical merit." East Side Story was placed at number 2 on the list, only being beaten by Thriller by Michael Jackson. The Toronto Star went on to note that "songwriters Chris Difford and Glenn Tilbrook hit their creative peak in 1981, grafting Motown rhythms, country melodies and close harmonies onto a nervy New Wave soundtrack. At once ironic and sentimental, East Side Story is a masterpiece of kitchen-sink drama, from the shattered war bride in "Labelled With Love" to the harried housewife of "Woman's World"." The New York Times praised the album as an "exceptionally satisfying pop record".

Bechirian later said of the album, "I think the sound they got was amazing on that record. I'm really, really pleased with it. I think it's one of the best works that I've been involved with". Difford named the LP one of the two great albums that Squeeze ever made.

== Track listing ==
All tracks are written by Chris Difford and Glenn Tilbrook, except where noted. All tracks produced by Roger Béchirian and Elvis Costello, except "In Quintessence", produced by Dave Edmunds with assistance from Neil King, and "Lookin' for a Love", produced by Nick Lowe.

Side one
No.	Title	Vocals	Length
1.	"In Quintessence"	Difford and Tilbrook	2:55
2.	"Someone Else's Heart"	Difford with Paul Carrack and Tilbrook	3:00
3.	"Tempted"	Carrack with Tilbrook and Elvis Costello	4:00
4.	"Piccadilly"	Tilbrook with Carrack, Difford and John Bentley	3:26
5.	"There's No Tomorrow"	Tilbrook with Carrack and Costello	3:27
6.	"Heaven"	Difford with Bentley and Tilbrook	3:49
7.	"Woman's World"	Tilbrook	3:42

Side two
No.	Title	Vocals	Length
1.	"Is That Love"	Tilbrook with Difford and Bentley	2:31
2.	"F-Hole"	Tilbrook	4:41
3.	"Labelled with Love"	Tilbrook	4:44
4.	"Someone Else's Bell"	Tilbrook with Difford	3:08
5.	"Mumbo Jumbo"	Tilbrook with Difford	3:13
6.	"Vanity Fair"	Tilbrook	3:09
7.	"Messed Around"	Tilbrook	2:42

Bonus tracks (1997 reissue)
No.	Title	Writer(s)	Length
15.	"The Axe Has Now Fallen"		3:51
16.	"Lookin' for a Love"	James Alexander; Zelda Samuels	3:00

== Personnel ==
=== Squeeze ===
- Glenn Tilbrook – lead vocals, lead guitars
- Chris Difford – rhythm guitars, backing vocals, lead vocals on "Someone Else's Heart" and "Heaven"
- Paul Carrack – keyboards, backing vocals, lead vocals on "Tempted"
- John Bentley – bass, backing vocals
- Gilson Lavis – drums

=== Additional personnel ===
- Del Newman – orchestra arrangements
- Elvis Costello – additional vocals on "Tempted", backing vocals on "There's No Tomorrow"

=== Production ===
- Dave Edmunds – producer (1)
- Neill King – assistant producer (1)
- Roger Bechirian – producer (2–15)
- Elvis Costello – producer (2–15)
- Nick Lowe – producer (16)
- Bob Bromide – photography

== Charts ==
=== Album ===
Chart performance for East Side Story
Chart (1981)	Peak position
UK Albums (OCC)	19
US Billboard Pop Albums	44

=== Singles ===
Year	Single	Chart	Peak position
1981	"In Quintessence"	Billboard Mainstream Rock	39
1981	"Tempted"	Billboard Mainstream Rock	8
