= Is That Love =

Single by Squeeze

from the album East Side Story
- Released: 1981
- Recorded: 1980
- Genre: Rock, new wave
- Length: 2:34
- Label: A&M
- Songwriters: Chris Difford, Glenn Tilbrook
- Producers: Roger Bechirian, Elvis Costello

Squeeze singles chronology
"Farfisa Beat" (1980)	"Is That Love" (1981)	"Tempted" (1981)

"Is That Love" is a new wave song by Squeeze that was released in 1981 on the band's fourth album, East Side Story. Written by Glenn Tilbrook and Chris Difford, the song features lyrics about Difford's marriage and features a quick tempo with a piano-based ending.

Released as the first single from the album, the song saw commercial success in the UK. It has since become a live favorite for the band and has seen positive reception from critics.

== Background ==
"Is That Love" was inspired by Squeeze lyricist Chris Difford's then-recent marriage; he explained, "This was written around the time I got married. I remember being in the bathroom and seeing Cindy's wedding ring next to the soap, which inspired me to write the lyric. I don't think it was particularly about our marriage, but it started off a sequence of ideas in my head." Difford also went on to say, "I'm not strapped to the song emotionally but it was a great live number and sums up being on the road and having fun. It's a comfortable pair of jeans as a song."

Glenn Tilbrook stated that the track was originally recorded in mid-tempo but was not coming together, "so we sped it up and it made more sense like that[.]" Tilbrook also said, "I was influenced quite consiously by The Beatles here." Tilbrook noted that the "ending was [Elvis Costello's] idea, and he played the piano part accompanying it."

== Reception ==
=== Critical reception ===
AllMusic critic Stephen Thomas Erlewine said that Squeeze's "barbed, bouncy pop" is "best heard on the single 'Is That Love'" and he cited the track as a highlight from East Side Story. Tom Jackson of the Sandusky Register praised the song's "zingers", such as "Beat me up with your letters, your walk out note" and "My assets froze while yours have dropped". Lyndsey Parker of Yahoo Music named the song as one of Squeeze's tracks that are "as clever, tuneful, and instant-classic as anything recorded by the Beatles".

Difford himself was complimentary of the song, saying, "Yes I love this one, great song, wonderful melody and attack, a band on its hind legs".

=== Chart performance ===
When the song was released as a single, it peaked at number 35 on the UK Singles Chart, as well as 25 in Ireland. The song also became Squeeze's only number one single, as it topped the charts in Israel.

== Covers ==
In 2007, Scottish group Travis covered the song on their single "Selfish Jean".

== Track listing ==
1. "Is That Love" (2:34)
2. "Trust" (1:45)
