= Tempted (Squeeze song) =

- Artwork for original UK vinyl single

Single by Squeeze

from the album East Side Story
- Released: 10 July 1981 (UK)
- Recorded: 1981
- Genre: Blue-eyed soul; R&B; new wave; power pop
- Length: 4:04 (album version); 3:53 (US single edit); 4:07 (Tempted '94)
- Label: A&M
- Songwriters: Glenn Tilbrook; Chris Difford
- Producers: Roger Béchirian; Elvis Costello

Squeeze singles chronology
"Is That Love" (1981)	"Tempted" (1981)	"Labelled with Love" (1981)

"Tempted" is a song by the British rock band Squeeze. Written by the Squeeze songwriting team of Glenn Tilbrook and Chris Difford, the song features lyrics inspired by Difford's experiences on an American tour and an arrangement inspired by the Temptations. "Tempted" is one of a few Squeeze songs with Paul Carrack as lead vocalist, at the suggestion of producer Elvis Costello.

"Tempted" was released as the second single from their fourth album, East Side Story, in 1981. The single was only a moderate chart hit at the time; however, it has since become one of the band's most famous songs, appearing in movies, TV shows, video games, and commercials. It has also seen critical acclaim and has become a mainstay of the band's live setlist, often being sung by Tilbrook.

== Background ==
"Tempted" was cowritten by Glenn Tilbrook and Chris Difford. Difford wrote the lyrics while the band was taking a taxi to Heathrow Airport. The descriptions of the city and airport sights are interspersed with the narrator's ruminations on a relationship that is failing, or has failed, due to his own infidelities. As Difford recalled,

The original story behind "Tempted" is we're going on another American tour. I got on a taxi and I started writing down what I saw lyrically. I don't know the course of time of how long it took, but then I gave Glenn the lyrics and then Glenn put the music to it. It's an extraordinary song. It's one of the most played songs that we have in our catalog.

Unlike most other Squeeze songs, which are sung usually by Tilbrook or Difford, the song's lead vocal is sung by newly recruited keyboardist Paul Carrack. According to Carrack, this was the result of a suggestion by co-producer Elvis Costello:

They’d actually recorded a version of that song before I was on board. Dave Edmunds produced it, and it was completely different. The song was in the can, and we were recording the other songs from East Side Story when we had some downtime and played 'Tempted' but in that slow, soulful, Motown groove. Elvis Costello, who was producing, ran in and said, 'Let's put this down on tape!' So, we did, and Elvis said 'Paul, you should sing it.'

Costello noted that, while Tilbrook initially took offence to ceding lead vocal duties to Carrack, the personnel change benefitted the song: "Guess what, we had a hit with it, so I guess I was right in that respect. I heard Paul putting it over to a broader audience." Tilbrook similarly recalled, "[Carrack] did a remarkable job [although] my ego was bruised initially." Though the original arrangement, according to Tilbrook, "sounded like ELO," the final version song instead features a Temptations-style performance that featured Tilbrook and Costello performing parts of the song's second verse.

Tilbrook considers this one of his favourite songs: "It was our first song. It was when we grew up, really, as a band. When we finished it I couldn't quite believe it was us." Difford also named the song as a favourite, saying "I do love 'Tempted'. It's so visual and again floats me back to that time when youth was a cloud I drifted around on from day to day". Squeeze bassist John Bentley ranked it his fourth favorite Squeeze song.

== Release ==
"Tempted" was released as the second single from the band's 1981 album East Side Story. The single was only a moderate success on the charts, reaching number 41 in the UK, number 45 in Canada, number 49 in the US, number 90 in Australia. Over the years it has become one of Squeeze's best-known songs; as Stewart Mason of AllMusic remarked, "Although its increasing ubiquity on '80s hits radio and on television (it was used in a successful clothing commercial in 2003) would suggest otherwise, Squeeze's 'Tempted' was not actually a hit single."

In 1994, Squeeze remixed and overdubbed the original recording to create a 'new' version of the song for the soundtrack to the film Reality Bites. This version received some radio airplay and was dubbed "Tempted '94". It can also be heard in the TV show Ashes to Ashes and The Office.

In 2010, the song appeared in re-recorded form on Spot the Difference, a retrospective of Squeeze hits performed by the 2010 edition of the band. Though Carrack was no longer a member of Squeeze at this point, he sat in as a guest and sang lead vocals on this re-recorded track.

== Reception ==
Record World said that Squeeze provides a "somewhat novel approach" to the common pop music theme of temptation.

Stewart Mason of AllMusic lauded the track "a blue-eyed soul classic like no other". Rolling Stone praised Carrack's singing on the song, commenting, "Paul Carrack's soulful crooning, a highlight of the blue-eyed R&B strut 'Tempted,' is a welcome addition." American Songwriter similarly praised the song, calling it the "centerpiece" of East Side Story and stating, "Difford and Tilbrook, with a big assist from Carrack, sure captured Beatlesque pop perfection with 'Tempted.'"

== Other notable versions ==
In 1997, original Squeeze keyboardist Jools Holland covered the song on his album Lift the Lid, which was a nod to his history with the band.

In 2019, critically acclaimed R&B singer Erykah Badu released her own jazz-influenced cover of the song.

== Personnel ==
- Paul Carrack – lead vocals, organ, piano, marimba
- Glenn Tilbrook – lead guitar, vocals
- Chris Difford – rhythm guitar, backing vocals
- John Bentley – bass guitar, backing vocals
- Gilson Lavis – drums
- Elvis Costello – vocals

== Track listing ==
=== 7" ===
1. "Tempted" (4:04)
2. "Yap Yap Yap" (4:13)

=== 7" (US release) ===
1. "Tempted" (3:53)
2. "Trust" (1:45)

== Charts ==
Chart (1981–1982)	Peak position
Australia (Kent Music Report)	95
Canada Top Singles (RPM)	45
UK Singles (Official Charts)	41
US Billboard Hot 100	49
US Rock Top Tracks (Billboard)	8

Chart (1994)	Peak position
Iceland (Íslenski Listinn Topp 40)	32
