= Jools' Annual Hootenanny =

British New Year's Eve music television show

- Also known as: Jools Holland's Annual Hootenanny
- Genre: Light entertainment
- Directed by: Janet Fraser Crook
- Presented by: Jools Holland
- Starring: Jools Holland's Rhythm and Blues Orchestra; Various guests
- Country of origin: United Kingdom
- Original language: English
- No. of episodes: 33

Production
- Production locations: Television Centre (1994–2012); Riverside Studios (2021); The Maidstone Studios (2013–2020, 2022–2024); Versa London Studios (2025-)
- Camera setup: Multi-camera
- Running time: 60–120 minutes
- Production companies: BBC Studios; BBC Music

Original release
- Network: BBC Two
- Release: 1 January 1994 – present

Related
- Later... with Jools Holland (1992–present)

Jools' Annual Hootenanny is a British New Year's Eve music television show broadcast by BBC Two in the United Kingdom since 1994. Its presenter, Jools Holland, and his 19 piece big band, Jools Holland's Rhythm and Blues Orchestra, both perform and accompany many of the guest stars. His show Later... with Jools Holland, which began two years earlier, is similar in format but nowadays rarely include his big band.

From the show's inception until 1996/97, it began at midnight, preceded by a BBC Two alarm clock ident, and going straight into Auld Lang Syne played by the Pipes and Drums of the Scots Guards. Since 1997/98, the show has begun before midnight, nowadays around 11:30 p.m., with Holland himself inviting the audience and viewers to join in a countdown. It usually lasts around 2 hours, ending at approximately 1:30 a.m. "Hootenanny" is a term of Appalachian origin referring to a rowdy musical party.

The pre-recorded show features a Hogmanay party atmosphere with all the guests (drawn from across the world of showbusiness) and other guest audience members present, and the artists themselves getting involved alongside a variety of musical acts by the artists from various genres who perform both before and after midnight. There is a countdown to the midnight start of the New Year, followed by a traditional rendition of "Auld Lang Syne", normally with the Pipes and Drums of the Scots Guards. Among the regular events of the evening is the spot where Holland asks actors and comedians Rowland Rivron and Vic Reeves their predictions for the year ahead/their New Year's resolutions. Editions also feature a white-suited man with a clock for a face named Father Time or Clockman.

== Production ==
The show is pre-recorded (usually in early to mid-December in recent years), but is presented as if live, with a countdown to midnight and references to the new calendar year. The BBC has described the show as "an idealised New Year's Eve party with a line-up that would surely be impossible to deliver on 31 December".

== 2006/07 edition ==
Acts that appeared in 2006/07 included the Zutons and Seasick Steve. Comedian Adrian Edmondson, a regular on the show, was joined by Jools and his band to perform a swing version of the Sex Pistols song "Anarchy in the U.K." Also appearing on the show was Amy Winehouse collaborating with Paul Weller on two tracks, "I Heard It Through the Grapevine" and "Don't Go to Strangers", originally recorded by Etta Jones.

Kate Rusby sang "Fare Thee Well" as midnight struck, accompanied by the 1st Battalion Scots Guards.

== 2007/08 edition ==
=== Artists who performed on the 2007/08 show ===
- Adele
- Duffy
- Eddie Floyd
- Kaiser Chiefs
- Lulu
- Madness
- Paul McCartney
- Mika
- Kylie Minogue
- Kate Nash
- Ruby Turner
- Seasick Steve

=== Playlist of the 2007/08 show ===
These are the songs that were performed during the 2007 show:

- "Jumping at the Jubilee" (performed by Ruby Turner and the Jools Holland & His Rhythm & Blues Orchestra)
- "634-5789" (performed by Eddie Floyd and the Jools Holland Rhythm & Blues Orchestra)
- "Everything Is Average Nowadays" (performed by Kaiser Chiefs)
- "Where Have All The Good Guys Gone" (performed by Lulu and the Jools Holland Rhythm & Blues Orchestra)
- "NW5" (performed by Madness)
- "The First Cut Is the Deepest" (performed by Duffy and the Jools Holland Rhythm & Blues Orchestra)
- "Mouthwash" (performed by Kate Nash)
- "Come on Strong" (performed by Kylie Minogue and the Jools Holland Rhythm & Blues Orchestra)
- "My Donny" (performed by Seasick Steve)
- "Ain't Got No, I Got Life" (performed by Mika and the Jools Holland Rhythm & Blues Orchestra)
- "House of Fun" (performed by Madness)
- "Dance Tonight" (performed by Paul McCartney, Kylie Minogue and the Jools Holland Rhythm & Blues Orchestra)
- "Auld Lang Syne" (performed by The Pipers of the Regimental Scots Guards and the Jools Holland Rhythm & Blues Orchestra)
- "Knock on Wood" (performed by Eddie Floyd and the Jools Holland Rhythm & Blues Orchestra)
- "Ruby" (performed by Kaiser Chiefs)
- "2 Hearts" (performed by Kylie Minogue and the Jools Holland Rhythm & Blues Orchestra)
- "Baggy Trousers" (performed by Madness)
- "Got to Get You into My Life" (performed by Paul McCartney and the Jools Holland Rhythm & Blues Orchestra)
- "Foundations" (performed by Kate Nash)
- "Grace Kelly" (performed by Mika and the Jools Holland Rhythm & Blues Orchestra)
- "I Should Be So Lucky" (performed by Kylie Minogue and Jools Holland)
- "The Angry Mob" (performed by Kaiser Chiefs and The Drums of the Regimental Scots Guards)
- "Cut My Wings" (performed by Seasick Steve)
- "Bring It On Home to Me" (performed by Eddie Floyd, Duffy and the Jools Holland Rhythm & Blues Orchestra)
- "Our House" (performed by Madness)
- "Pumpkin Soup" (performed by Kate Nash)
- "Up Above My Head" (performed by Ruby Turner, Paul McCartney, Eddie Floyd, Kylie Minogue, Mika, Seasick Steve, Duffy, Lulu and the Jools Holland Rhythm & Blues Orchestra)

== 2008/09 edition ==
=== Playlist of the 2008/2009 Edition ===
- "The Informer" (performed by Ruby Turner and the Jools Holland Rhythm & Blues Orchestra)
- "Rockferry", "Mercy" and "Rain on Your Parade" (performed by Duffy)
- "Chasing Pavements" and "I Just Want to Make Love to You" (performed by Adele with Jools Holland & His Rhythm & Blues Orchestra)
- "Black and Gold" (performed by Sam Sparro with Jools Holland & His Rhythm & Blues Orchestra)
- "Dance wiv Me" (performed by Dizzee Rascal with Calvin Harris)
- "Sequestered in Memphis" and "Stay Positive" (performed by The Hold Steady)
- "That's Not My Name", "Great DJ" and "Shut Up and Let Me Go" (performed by The Ting Tings)
- "Dancing in the Street", "(Love Is Like A) Heat Wave" and "Jimmy Mack" (performed by Martha and the Vandellas)
- "I Hear You Knocking" (performed by Dave Edmunds)
- "Why" (performed by Annie Lennox with Jools Holland & His Rhythm & Blues Orchestra)
- "The Lady Is a Tramp" (performed by Lily Allen with Jools Holland & His Rhythm & Blues Orchestra)
- "L-O-V-E" (performed by Rico Rodriguez)
- "Kua Kua Kome Kiki?" (performed by Sväng)
- "My Girl" and "Handbags and Gladrags" (performed by Kelly Jones)
- "Peace in the Valley" (performed by Ruby Turner with Adele, Sam Sparro, Martha and the Vandellas, Dave Edmunds and Jools Holland & His Rhythm & Blues Orchestra)

== 2009/10 edition ==
=== Artists who performed on the 2009/10 show ===
- Tom Jones
- Boy George
- Dizzee Rascal
- Florence + the Machine
- Paolo Nutini
- Dave Edmunds
- Kasabian
- Rodrigo y Gabriela
- Ruby Turner
- Paloma Faith
- Shingai Shoniwa
- Rico Rodriguez
- Kelly Jones
- White Rabbits

(Source: BBC)

=== Playlist of the 2009/10 edition ===
- "10/10" performed by Paolo Nutini
- "Rabbit Heart (Raise It Up)" performed by Florence + the Machine
- "Pentonville Blues" performed by Boy George
- "Hanuman" performed by Rodrigo y Gabriela
- "This Train" performed by Ruby Turner
- "TV Is the Thing This Year" performed by Paloma Faith
- "Underdog" performed by Kasabian
- "Mama Told Me Not To Come" performed by Tom Jones and Kelly Jones
- "Church of the Poison Mind" performed by Boy George
- "Holiday" performed by Dizzee Rascal and Shingai Shoniwa
- "Pencil Full of Lead" performed by Paolo Nutini
- "Sabre Dance" performed by Dave Edmunds
- "Auld Lang Syne" performed by everyone
- "In the Midnight Hour" performed by Tom Jones
- "Fire" performed by Kasabian
- "Don't Upset the Rhythm" performed by Shingai Shoniwa
- "Bonkers" performed by Dizzee Rascal
- "Karma Chameleon" performed by Boy George
- "Dog Days Are Over" performed by Florence + the Machine
- "Green Green Grass of Home" performed by Tom Jones
- "Lovin' Machine" performed by Paolo Nutini
- "Buster Voodoo" performed by Rodrigo y Gabriela
- "New York" performed by Paloma Faith
- "Stand Up Tall" performed by Dizzee Rascal
- "I've Got You Under My Skin" performed by Rico Rodriguez
- "My Baby Just Cares For Me" performed by Florence Welch
- "Empire" performed by Kasabian
- "Down by the Riverside" performed by Paloma Faith, Ruby Turner, Paolo Nutini, Florence + the Machine, Boy George, Shingai Shoniwa, Kelly Jones, Dave Edmunds and Tom Jones

== 2010/11 edition ==
=== Artists who performed on the 2010/11 show ===
- Wanda Jackson
- Vampire Weekend
- Toots Hibbert
- Bellowhead
- Alison Moyet
- Cee Lo Green
- The Secret Sisters
- Rico Rodriguez
- Rumer
- Plan B
- Ruby Turner
- Kylie Minogue
- BJ Cole
- Roger Daltrey
- Henry Dagg

(in order of performance)

=== Playlist of the 2010/11 edition ===
- "Sally Suzas" performed by Jools Holland & His Rhythm & Blues Orchestra
- "Rip It Up" performed by Jools Holland & His Rhythm & Blues Orchestra with Wanda Jackson
- "Run" performed by Vampire Weekend
- "Funky Kingston" performed by Jools Holland & His Rhythm & Blues Orchestra with Toots Hibbert
- "Whiskey Is The Life of Man" performed by Bellowhead
- "Love Letters" performed by Jools Holland & His Rhythm & Blues Orchestra with Alison Moyet
- "I Want You" performed by Jools Holland & His Rhythm & Blues Orchestra with Cee Lo Green
- "The One I Love Is Gone" performed by The Secret Sisters
- "What a Wonderful World" performed by Jools Holland & His Rhythm & Blues Orchestra with Rico Rodriguez
- "Aretha" performed by Jools Holland & His Rhythm & Blues Orchestra with Rumer
- "Stay Too Long" performed by Plan B
- "Roll Out of This Hole" performed by Jools Holland & His Rhythm & Blues Orchestra with Ruby Turner
- "Better than Today" performed by Jools Holland & His Rhythm & Blues Orchestra with Kylie Minogue
- "Auld Lang Syne" performed by everyone
- "Let's Have a Party" performed by Jools Holland & His Rhythm & Blues Orchestra with Wanda Jackson
- "She Said" performed by Plan B
- "Monkey Man" performed by Jools Holland & His Rhythm & Blues Orchestra with Toots Hibbert
- "Holiday" performed by Vampire Weekend
- "Love at First Sight" performed by Jools Holland & His Rhythm & Blues Orchestra with Kylie Minogue
- "New York Girls" performed by Bellowhead
- "Forget You" performed by Jools Holland & His Rhythm & Blues Orchestra with Cee Lo Green
- "Walkin' After Midnight" performed by The Secret Sisters feat. BJ Cole
- "Mannish Boy" performed by Jools Holland & His Rhythm & Blues Orchestra with Roger Daltrey
- "Cousins" performed by Vampire Weekend
- "Boom Boom" performed by Jools Holland & His Rhythm & Blues Orchestra with Alison Moyet
- "You Know I'm No Good" performed by Jools Holland & His Rhythm & Blues Orchestra with Wanda Jackson
- "Love Goes Down" performed by Plan B
- "Try Your Wings" performed by Kylie Minogue and Jools Holland
- "Pressure Drop" performed by Jools Holland & His Rhythm & Blues Orchestra with Toots Hibbert
- "Over The Rainbow/The Dambusters March" performed by Henry Dagg
- "Reet Petite" performed by Jools Holland & His Rhythm & Blues Orchestra with Cee Lo Green
- "Enjoy Yourself (It's Later Than You Think)" performed by Jools Holland & His Rhythm & Blues Orchestra with Wanda Jackson, Toots Hibbert, Alison Moyet, Cee Lo Green, The Secret Sisters, Rico Rodriguez, Rumer, Kylie Minogue and Roger Daltrey

== 2011/12 edition ==
=== Artists who performed on the 2011/12 show ===
- Betty Wright
- Aloe Blacc
- James Morrison
- Pokey LaFarge And The South City Three
- Cyndi Lauper
- Gregory Porter
- The Vaccines
- Caro Emerald
- Ruby Turner
- Imelda May
- Sandie Shaw
- Buddy Greco
- Jessie J
- Rico Rodriguez

(in order of performance)

=== Playlist of the 2011/12 edition ===
- "Double O Boogie" performed by Jools Holland & His Rhythm & Blues Orchestra
- "In The Middle of the Game (Don't Change The Play)" performed by Jools Holland & His Rhythm & Blues Orchestra with Betty Wright
- "Loving You Is Killing Me" performed by Aloe Blacc
- "In My Dreams" performed by Jools Holland & His Rhythm & Blues Orchestra with James Morrison
- "Drinkin' Whiskey Tonight" performed by Pokey Lafarge and the South City Three
- "Shattered Dreams" performed by Jools Holland & His Rhythm & Blues Orchestra with Cyndi Lauper
- "Let The Good Times Roll" performed by Jools Holland & His Rhythm & Blues Orchestra with Gregory Porter
- "Norgaard" performed by The Vaccines
- "A Night Like This" performed by Jools Holland & His Rhythm & Blues Orchestra with Caro Emerald
- "Get Away Jordan" performed by Jools Holland & His Rhythm & Blues Orchestra with Ruby Turner
- "Girls Just Want To Have Fun" performed by Jools Holland & His Rhythm & Blues Orchestra with Cyndi Lauper and Charlie Musselwhite
- "Mayhem" performed by Imelda May
- "Shoorah! Shoorah!" performed by Jools Holland & His Rhythm & Blues Orchestra with Betty Wright
- "I Need A Dollar" performed by Aloe Blacc
- "Always Something There To Remind Me" performed by Jools Holland & His Rhythm & Blues Orchestra with Sandie Shaw
- "If You Wanna" performed by The Vaccines
- "Fly Me to the Moon" performed by Jools Holland & His Rhythm & Blues Orchestra with Buddy Greco
- "Price Tag" performed by Jools Holland & His Rhythm & Blues Orchestra with Jessie J
- "Johnny Got a Boom Boom" performed by Imelda May
- "I Was Made To Love Her" performed by Jools Holland & His Rhythm & Blues Orchestra with James Morrison
- "Work Song" performed by Jools Holland & His Rhythm & Blues Orchestra with Gregory Porter
- "Wreckin' Bar (Ra Ra Ra)" performed by The Vaccines
- "Clean Up Woman" performed by Jools Holland & His Rhythm & Blues Orchestra with Betty Wright
- "La La Blues" performed by Pokey Lafarge and the South City Three
- "Long Live Love" performed by Jools Holland & His Rhythm & Blues Orchestra with Sandie Shaw
- "Mad About the Boy" performed by Jools Holland & His Rhythm & Blues Orchestra with Caro Emerald
- "Hey Brother" performed by Aloe Blacc
- "Time After Time" performed by Jools Holland & His Rhythm & Blues Orchestra with Cyndi Lauper
- "Inside Out" performed by Imelda May
- "I'm in the Mood for Love" performed by Jools Holland & His Rhythm & Blues Orchestra with Rico Rodriguez
- "In The Evening by the Moonlight" performed by Jools Holland & His Rhythm & Blues Orchestra with Aloe Blacc, Betty Wright, Buddy Greco, Caro Emerald, Cyndi Lauper, Gregory Porter, Imelda May, James Morrison, Jessie J, Ruby Turner and Sandie Shaw

== 2012/13 edition ==
=== Artists who performed on the 2012/13 show ===
- Ruby Turner
- The Hives
- Bettye LaVette
- Adam Ant
- Lianne La Havas
- Bobby Womack
- The Dubliners
- Petula Clark
- Emeli Sandé
- Roland Gift
- Paloma Faith
- Dexys Midnight Runners
- Professor Green
- Jake Bugg

(in order of performance)

=== Playlist of the 2012/13 edition ===
- "Maiden's Lament" performed by Jools Holland & His Rhythm & Blues Orchestra
- "Abel Mabel" performed by Jools Holland & His Rhythm & Blues Orchestra with Ruby Turner
- "Go Right Ahead" performed by The Hives
- "Let Me Down Easy" performed by Jools Holland & His Rhythm & Blues Orchestra with Bettye Lavette
- "Vince Taylor" performed by Adam Ant
- "Cow Cow Boogie" performed by Jools Holland & His Rhythm & Blues Orchestra with Lianne La Havas
- "Love Is Gonna Lift You Up" performed by Jools Holland & His Rhythm & Blues Orchestra with Bobby Womack
- "Whiskey in the Jar" performed by The Dubliners
- "I Couldn't Live Without Your Love" performed by Jools Holland & His Rhythm & Blues Orchestra with Petula Clark
- "Heaven" performed by Emeli Sandé
- "Good Thing" performed by Jools Holland & His Rhythm & Blues Orchestra with Roland Gift
- "I'm a Midnight Mover" performed by Jools Holland & His Rhythm & Blues Orchestra with Bobby Womack
- "Stand and Deliver" performed by Adam Ant
- "Something's Got a Hold on Me" performed by Jools Holland & His Rhythm & Blues Orchestra with Paloma Faith
- "Hate to Say I Told You So" performed by The Hives
- "Come on Eileen" performed by Dexys Midnight Runners
- "Read All About It" performed by Emeli Sandé and Professor Green
- "Downtown" performed by Jools Holland & His Rhythm & Blues Orchestra with Petula Clark
- "The Irish Rover" performed by The Dubliners
- "Suspicious Minds" performed by Jools Holland & His Rhythm & Blues Orchestra with Roland Gift
- "Antmusic" performed by Adam Ant
- "Geno" performed by Jools Holland & His Rhythm & Blues Orchestra with Dexys
- "Lightning Bolt" performed by Jake Bugg
- "Love Me Or Leave Me" performed by Jools Holland & His Rhythm & Blues Orchestra with Emeli Sandé
- "Crazy" performed by Jools Holland & His Rhythm & Blues Orchestra with Petula Clark
- "Tick Tick Boom" performed by The Hives
- "Age" performed by Jools Holland & His Rhythm & Blues Orchestra with Lianne La Havas
- "She Got A Wiggle" performed by Jools Holland & His Rhythm & Blues Orchestra with Dexys
- "The Black Velvet Band" performed by The Dubliners
- "I'm Not The One" performed by Jools Holland & His Rhythm & Blues Orchestra with Bettye Lavette
- "Just Be" performed by Paloma Faith
- "Next To Me" performed by Emeli Sandé
- "Lookin' For A Love" performed by Jools Holland & His Rhythm & Blues Orchestra with Bobby Womack
- "Enjoy Yourself (It's Later Than You Think)" performed by Jools Holland & His Rhythm & Blues Orchestra with Ruby Turner, Bobby Womack, Rico Rodriguez, Roland Gift, Bettye Lavette, Emeli Sandé, Paloma Faith, Lianne La Havas and Dexys

== 2013/14 edition ==
=== Artists who performed on the 2013/14 show ===
- Lisa Stansfield
- Haim
- Charlie Wilson
- Rudimental
- John Newman
- Ruby Turner
- Ray Davies
- Ella Eyre
- Melanie C
- Laura Mvula
- The Lumineers
- The Proclaimers
- Dawn Penn
- Lee Thompson
- Emeli Sandé

(in order of performance)

=== Playlist of the 2013/14 edition ===
- "That's Not What You Said Last Night" performed by Jools Holland & His Rhythm & Blues Orchestra
- "Carry On" performed by Jools Holland & His Rhythm & Blues Orchestra with Lisa Stansfield
- "Don't Save Me" performed by Haim
- "There Goes My Baby" performed by Jools Holland & His Rhythm & Blues Orchestra with Charlie Wilson
- "Feel the Love" performed by Rudimental and John Newman
- "Jumpin' in the Morning" performed by Jools Holland & His Rhythm & Blues Orchestra with Ruby Turner
- "All Day and All of the Night" performed by Jools Holland & His Rhythm & Blues Orchestra with Ray Davies
- "Waiting All Night" performed by Rudimental and Ella Eyre
- "I Wish" performed by Jools Holland & His Rhythm & Blues Orchestra with Melanie C
- "Green Garden" performed by Jools Holland & His Rhythm & Blues Orchestra with Laura Mvula
- "Ho Hey" performed by The Lumineers
- "Love Me Again" performed by Jools Holland & His Rhythm & Blues Orchestra with John Newman
- "Oops Upside Your head" performed by Jools Holland & His Rhythm & Blues Orchestra with Charlie Wilson
- "I'm Gonna Be (500 Miles)" performed by The Proclaimers
- "Lola" performed by Jools Holland & His Rhythm & Blues Orchestra with Ray Davies
- "All Around The World" performed by Jools Holland & His Rhythm & Blues Orchestra with Lisa Stansfield
- "Forever" performed by Haim
- "You Don't Love Me (No, No, No)" performed by Jools Holland & His Rhythm & Blues Orchestra with Dawn Penn, Lee Thompson & Darren Fordham
- "Free" performed by Rudimental and Emeli Sandé
- "Outstanding" performed by Jools Holland & His Rhythm & Blues Orchestra with Charlie Wilson
- "Letter From America" performed by The Proclaimers
- "See Line Woman" performed by Jools Holland & His Rhythm & Blues Orchestra with Laura Mvula
- "Never Be The Same Again" performed by Jools Holland & His Rhythm & Blues Orchestra with Melanie C
- "Classy Girls" performed by The Lumineers
- "Bangarang 2" performed by Jools Holland & His Rhythm & Blues Orchestra with Lee Thompson, Darren Fordham and Dawn Penn
- "A Fool For You" performed by Jools Holland & His Rhythm & Blues Orchestra with John Newman
- "Oh Well" performed by Haim
- "Wagner's Tannhăuser (Pilgrim's Chorus)" performed by Jools Holland & His Rhythm & Blues Orchestra
- "Skin and Bone" performed by Jools Holland & His Rhythm & Blues Orchestra with Ray Davies
- "Enjoy Yourself (It's Later Than You Think)" performed by Jools Holland & His Rhythm & Blues Orchestra with Dawn Penn, Lee Thompson, Ruby Turner, Melanie C, Charlie Wilson, Lisa Stansfield, Laura Mvula and John Newman

== 2014/15 edition ==
=== Artists who performed on the 2014/15 show ===
- William Bell
- Clean Bandit
- Paloma Faith
- Jess Glynne
- Ellie Goulding
- Hayseed Dixie
- Wilko Johnson
- Paolo Nutini
- Boz Scaggs
- Ed Sheeran
- Ronnie Spector
- Joss Stone
- Ruby Turner

=== Playlist of the 2014/15 edition ===
- "Sweethearts on Parade" performed by Jools Holland & his Rhythm and Blues Orchestra
- "Letting Me Down" performed by Joss Stone & Jools Holland & his Rhythm and Blues Orchestra
- "Going Back Home" performed by Wilko Johnson
- "I'm a Fool to Care" performed by Boz Scagges & Jools Holland & his Rhythm and Blues Orchestra
- "Master Blaster (Jammin')" performed by Ed Sheeran & Jools Holland & his Rhythm and Blues Orchestra
- "Ready for the Good Life" performed by Paloma Faith & Jools Holland & his Rhythm and Blues Orchestra
- "Everyday will be like a Holiday" performed by William Bell & Jools Holland & his Rhythm and Blues Orchestra
- "Peace in the Valley" performed by Ruby Turner & Jools Holland & his Rhythm and Blues Orchestra
- "Be My Baby" performed by Ronnie Spector & Jools Holland & his Rhythm and Blues Orchestra
- "Scream (Funk My Life Up)" performed by Paolo Nutini
- "Lido Shuffle" performed by Boz Scaggs & Jools Holland & his Rhythm and Blues Orchestra
- "River Deep – Mountain High" performed by Paloma Faith & Jools Holland & his Rhythm and Blues Orchestra
- "Happy" performed by William Bell & Jools Holland & his Rhythm and Blues Orchestra
- "Sing" performed by Ed Sheeran
- "Baby, I Love You" performed by Ronnie Spector & Jools Holland & his Rhythm and Blues Orchestra
- "Anything Could Happen" performed by Ellie Goulding & Jools Holland & his Rhythm and Blues Orchestra
- "All Through the City" performed by Wilko Johnson
- "Rather Be" performed by Clean Bandit & Jess Glynne
- "Pencil Full of Lead" performed by Paolo Nutini
- "Private Number performed by William Bell, Joss Stone & Jools Holland & his Rhythm and Blues Orchestra
- "Blame It on the Boogie" performed by Ellie Goulding & Jools Holland & his Rhythm and Blues Orchestra
- "Eye of the Tiger" performed by Hayseed Dixie
- "Thinking Out Loud" performed by Ed Sheeran & Jools Holland & his Rhythm and Blues Orchestra
- "Lowdown" performed by Boz Scaggs & Jools Holland & his Rhythm and Blues Orchestra
- "Take Me" performed by Paloma Faith & Jools Holland & his Rhythm and Blues Orchestra
- "Bei Mir Bistu Shein" performed by Joss Stone & Jools Holland & his Rhythm and Blues Orchestra
- "No Other Way" performed by Paolo Nutini
- "Walking in the Rain" performed by Ronnie Spector & Jools Holland & his Rhythm and Blues Orchestra
- "Hit the Road Jack" performed by Jools Holland & his Rhythm and Blues Orchestra and ensemble

== 2015/16 edition ==
=== Artists who performed on the 2015/16 show ===
- James Bay
- Jeff Beck
- Future Islands
- Rhiannon Giddens
- Jess Glynne
- Beth Hart
- Hozier
- Sir Tom Jones
- The Selecter
- KT Tunstall
- Ruby Turner
- Paul Weller

=== Playlist of the 2015/16 edition ===
- "Early in the Morning" performed by Jools Holland & his Rhythm and Blues Orchestra
- "Pray Have Mercy" performed by Ruby Turner & Jools Holland & His Rhythm and Blues Orchestra
- "Hold My Hand" performed by Jess Glynne
- "Take My Love" performed by Jools Holland & His Rhythm and Blues Orchestra
- "Back in the Tall Grass" performed by Future Islands
- "Train to Skaville" performed by The Selecter & Jools Holland & His Rhythm and Blues Orchestra
- "Waterboy" performed by Rhiannon Giddens
- "Take Me to Church" performed by Hozier & Jools Holland & His Rhythm and Blues Orchestra
- "Saturn's Pattern" performed by Paul Weller
- "St. James Infirmary Blues" performed by Tom Jones, Rhiannon Giddens & Jools Holland & His Rhythm and Blues Orchestra
- "Night and Day" performed by KT Tunstall & Jools Holland & His Rhythm and Blues Orchestra
- "Nutbush City Limits" performed by Beth Hart, Jeff Beck & Jools Holland & His Rhythm and Blues Orchestra
- "Start" performed by Paul Weller
- "Hold Back the River" performed by James Bay & Jools Holland & His Rhythm and Blues Orchestra
- "Right Here" performed by Jess Glynne
- "Kiss" performed by Tom Jones & Jools Holland & His Rhythm and Blues Orchestra
- "On My Radio" performed by The Selecter & Jools Holland & His Rhythm and Blues Orchestra
- "Seasons (Waiting on You)" performed by Future Islands
- "Domino" performed by Hozier & Jools Holland & His Rhythm and Blues Orchestra
- "White Sky" performed by Paul Weller
- "Sex Bomb performed by Tom Jones & Jools Holland & His Rhythm and Blues Orchestra
- "Up Above My Head" performed by Rhiannon Giddens & Jools Holland & His Rhythm and Blues Orchestra
- "Tell Her You Belong To Me" performed by Beth Hart, Jeff Beck & Jools Holland & His Rhythm and Blues Orchestra
- "Count Me In" performed by Ruby Turner & Jools Holland & His Rhythm and Blues Orchestra
- "Hallelujah, I Love You So" performed by Paul Weller, Tom Jones & Jools Holland & His Rhythm and Blues Orchestra
- "Love Me" performed by Jess Glynne
- "Proud Mary" performed by James Bay & Jools Holland & His Rhythm and Blues Orchestra
- "Enjoy Yourself (It's Later than You Think)" performed by Jools Holland & His Rhythm and Blues Orchestra and ensemble

== 2016/17 edition ==
=== Artists who performed on the 2016/17 show ===
- ABC
- Gregory Porter
- Chaka Khan
- Roy Wood
- Seasick Steve
- Rag'n'Bone Man
- Christine and the Queens
- Ruby Turner
- UB40
- Caravan Palace
- Imelda May
- John Porter

=== Playlist of the 2016/17 edition ===
- "Midnight Special" performed by Jools Holland & His Rhythm & Blues Orchestra
- "Same Old Heart" performed by Ruby Turner & Jools Holland & His Rhythm & Blues Orchestra
- "Gypsy Blood" performed by Seasick Steve
- "Don't Lose Your Steam" performed by Gregory Porter & Jools Holland & His Rhythm & Blues Orchestra
- "Help Me" performed by Chaka Khan & Jools Holland & His Rhythm & Blues Orchestra
- "Saint Claude" performed by Christine and the Queens
- "(Reach Out) I'll Be There" performed by Rag and Bone man Jools Holland & His Rhythm & Blues Orchestra
- "Bumble Boogie" performed by Jools Holland & His Rhythm & Blues Orchestra
- "Let the Good Times Roll" performed by Ruby Turner, Jools Holland & His Rhythm & Blues Orchestra
- "See My Baby Jive" performed by Roy Wood, Jools Holland & His Rhythm & Blues Orchestra
- "Black Betty" performed by Caravan Palace
- "I'm Every Woman" performed by Chaka Khan & Jools Holland & His Rhythm & Blues Orchestra
- "Look of Love" performed by ABC
- "Red Red Wine" performed by UB40 & Jools Holland & His Rhythm & Blues Orchestra
- "Black tears" performed by Imelda May & Jools Holland & His Rhythm & Blues Orchestra
- "Tilted" performed by Christine and the Queens
- "Sunny" performed by Gregory Porter & Jools Holland & His Rhythm & Blues Orchestra
- "That's all" performed by Seasick Steve
- "Human" performed by Rag n Bone Man & Jools Holland & His Rhythm & Blues Orchestra
- "Poison Arrow" performed by ABC
- "Ain't Nobody" performed by Chaka Khan & Jools Holland & His Rhythm & Blues Orchestra
- "Blackberry Way" performed by Roy Wood, Jools Holland & His Rhythm & Blues Orchestra
- "Lone Digger" performed by Caravan Palace
- "Black Tears" performed by Imelda May, Jools Holland & His Rhythm & Blues Orchestra
- "I Got You Babe" performed by Ali Campbell and his Daughter Kaya & Jools Holland & His Rhythm & Blues Orchestra
- "Thunderbird" performed by Seasick Steve
- "Way Down Yonder in New Orleans" performed by Dr John Cooper Clarke & Hugh Cornwell & Jools Holland & His Rhythm & Blues Orchestra
- "Viva Love" performed by ABC
- "Sign Your Name" performed by Christine and the Queens & Jools Holland & His Rhythm & Blues Orchestra
- "Bring It On Home to Me" performed by Gregory Porter and Rag n Bone man
- "Enjoy Yourself" performed by guest artists & Jools Holland & His Rhythm & Blues Orchestra

== 2017/18 edition ==
=== Artists who performed on the 2017/18 show ===
- Ed Sheeran
- Mavis Staples
- Trombone Shorty
- Jessie Ware
- Soul II Soul
- Beth Ditto
- The Beat starring Dave Wakeling
- George McCrae
- José Feliciano
- Ruby Turner

=== Playlist of the 2017/18 edition ===
- "Happy New Year" performed by Jose Feliciano & Jools Holland & His Rhythm & Blues Orchestra
- "Hit the road Jack" performed by Jose Feliciano, Ruby Turner & Jools Holland & His Rhythm & Blues Orchestra
- "Where it At ?" performed by Trombone Shorty & Orleans Avenue
- "Alone" performed by Jessie Ware & Jools Holland & His Rhythm & Blues Orchestra
- "Hands Off Shes Mine" performed by The Beat featuring Dave Wakeling
- "Fire" performed by Beth Ditto & Jools Holland & His Rhythm & Blues Orchestra
- "Castle on the Hill" performed by Ed Sheeran
- "Light my Fire" performed by Jose Feliciano & Jools Holland & His Rhythm & Blues Orchestra
- "Midnight Special" performed by Jose Feliciano, Jools Holland & His Rhythm & Blues Orchestra & Trombone Shorty
- "Mirror in the Bathroom" performed by The Beat featuring Dave Wakeling
- "If You're Ready (Come go with me)" performed by Mavis Staples & Jools Holland & His Rhythm & Blues Orchestra
- "Shape of You" performed by Ed Sheeran
- "Rock you Baby" performed by George McCrae & Jools Holland & His Rhythm & Blues Orchestra
- "Back to Life" performed by Soul II Soul
- "Young Hearts Run Free" performed by Beth Ditto & Jools Holland & His Rhythm & Blues Orchestra
- "Here Comes the Girls" performed by Trombone Shorty & Orleans Avenue
- "Layla" performed by Ed Sheeran & Jools Holland & His Rhythm & Blues Orchestra
- "Do Nothin' Till You Hear From Me" performed by Jessie Ware & Jools Holland & His Rhythm & Blues Orchestra
- "Tears of a Clown" performed by The Beat featuring Dave Wakeling
- "On Revival Day" performed by Ruby Turner & Jools Holland & His Rhythm & Blues Orchestra
- "Love" performed by George McCrae & Jools Holland & His Rhythm & Blues Orchestra
- "Keep on Movin" performed by Soul II Soul
- "If All I Was Was Black" performed by Mavis Staples & Jools Holland & His Rhythm & Blues Orchestra
- "Perfect" performed by Ed Sheeran & Jools Holland & His Rhythm & Blues Orchestra
- "How Can You Stand There" performed by The Beat featuring Dave Wakeling
- "As You See Me Now" performed by Jose Feliciano, Jools Holland & His Rhythm & Blues Orchestra
- "The Weight" performed by Mavis Staples & Jools Holland & His Rhythm & Blues Orchestra
- "Enjoy Yourself" performed by guest artists & Jools Holland & His Rhythm & Blues Orchestra

== 2018/19 edition ==
=== Artists who performed on the 2018/19 show ===
As listed on the BBC Two show website:

- Marc Almond
- Michael Bublé
- George Ezra
- Hot 8 Brass Band
- Junior Giscombe
- Jess Glynne
- Nile Rodgers & Chic
- The Record Company
- Rudimental
- Ruby Turner
- Yola

The programme also featured, as usual, Jools Holland & His Rhythm & Blues Orchestra and the 1st Battalion Scots Guards Pipes and Drums.

=== Playlist of the 2018/19 edition ===
As listed on the BBC Two show website:

- "You Done Me Wrong" performed by Jools Holland & His Rhythm & Blues Orchestra
- "Don't Matter Now" performed by George Ezra
- "Faraway Look" performed by Yola and Jools Holland & His Rhythm & Blues Orchestra
- "Life to Fix" performed by The Record Company
- "I'll Be There" performed by Jess Glynne and Jools Holland & His Rhythm & Blues Orchestra
- "Get Up" performed by The Hot 8 Brass Band
- "Sun Comes Up" performed by Rudimental and James Arthur
- "When You're Smiling" performed by Michael Buble and Jools Holland & His Rhythm & Blues Orchestra
- "Time is Winding up" performed by Ruby Turner and Jools Holland & His Rhythm & Blues Orchestra
- "Auld Lang Syne" performed by The 1st Battalion Scots Guards & Louise Marshall
- "Good Times" performed by Jools Holland & His Rhythm & Blues Orchestra, Nile Rodgers & Chic
- "Paradise" performed by George Ezra
- "Tainted Love" performed by Jools Holland & His Rhythm & Blues Orchestra & Marc Almond
- "These Days" performed by Rudimental (feat. Jess Glynne & Dan Caplen)
- "Such A Night" performed by Jools Holland & His Rhythm & Blues Orchestra & Michael Bublé
- "Mama Used To Say" performed by Jools Holland & His Rhythm & Blues Orchestra & Junior Giscombe
- "I'm Getting Better (And I'm Feeling It Right Now)" performed by The Record Company
- "Slow Train / Long Walk To DC" performed by Yola and Jools Holland & His Rhythm & Blues Orchestra
- "Shotgun" performed by George Ezra
- "Le Freak" performed by Jools Holland & His Rhythm & Blues Orchestra, Nile Rodgers & Chic
- "Love Will Tear Us Apart" performed by The Hot 8 Brass Band
- "I Only Have Eyes For You" performed by Jools Holland & His Rhythm & Blues Orchestra & Michael Bublé
- "Gipsy Rover" performed by Jools Holland & His Rhythm & Blues Orchestra & Marc Almond
- "Sweet Love" performed by Rudimental (feat. Bridgette Amofah)
- "Enjoy Yourself" performed by Jools Holland & His Rhythm & Blues Orchestra & Ruby Turner

== 2019/20 edition ==
Whilst Series 54 of Later... was recorded at Television Centre, the 2019/20 Hootenanny was recorded at The Maidstone Studios.

=== Artists who performed on the 2019/20 show ===
As listed on the BBC Two show website:

- Ruby Turner
- Stereophonics
- Brittany Howard
- Stormzy
- Rick Astley
- Joseph
- YolanDa Brown
- The Selecter (Arthur 'Gaps' Hendrickson and Pauline Black)
- Eddi Reader
- Melanie
- La Roux
- Tom Walker

The programme also featured, as usual, Jools Holland & His Rhythm & Blues Orchestra and the 1st Battalion Scots Guards Pipes and Drums.

=== Playlist of the 2019/2020 Edition ===
- "Jumpin at the Woodside" performed by Jools Holland & His Rhythm & Blues Orchestra
- "Come on In" performed by Jools Holland & His Rhythm & Blues Orchestra with Ruby Turner
- "Bust This Town" performed by Stereophonics
- "Stay High" performed by Jools Holland & His Rhythm & Blues Orchestra with Brittany Howard
- "Crown" performed by Stormzy
- "Every One of Us" performed by Jools Holland & His Rhythm & Blues Orchestra with Rick Astley
- "Without You" performed by Joseph
- "I Put a Spell on You" performed by Jools Holland & His Rhythm & Blues Orchestra with Kelly Jones & YolanDa Brown
- "Too Much Pressure" performed by Jools Holland & His Rhythm & Blues Orchestra with Pauline Black & Arthur 'Gaps' Hendrickson
- "Auld Lang Syne" performed by The 1st Battalion Scots Guards & Eddi Reader
- "Perfect" performed by Eddi Reader
- "Dakota" performed by Stereophonics
- "Never Gonna Give You Up" performed by Jools Holland & His Rhythm & Blues Orchestra with Rick Astley
- "Vossi Bop" performed by Stormzy
- "(Your Love Keeps Lifting Me) Higher and Higher" performed by Jools Holland & His Rhythm & Blues Orchestra with Brittany Howard
- "Look What They've Done to My Song, Ma" performed by Jools Holland & His Rhythm & Blues Orchestra with Melanie
- "In for the Kill" performed by La Roux
- "Just You and I" performed by Jools Holland & His Rhythm & Blues Orchestra with Tom Walker
- "White Flag" performed by Joseph
- "La Vie En Rose" performed by Jools Holland & His Rhythm & Blues Orchestra & Eddi Reader
- "Don't Let The Devil Take Another Day" performed by Stereophonics
- "Ain't Too Proud to Beg" performed by Jools Holland & His Rhythm & Blues Orchestra with Rick Astley & YolanDa Brown
- "Do Better" performed by Stormzy
- "Brand New Key" performed by Jools Holland & His Rhythm & Blues Orchestra with Melanie
- "International Woman of Leisure" performed by La Roux
- "Secret Love" performed by Jools Holland & His Rhythm & Blues Orchestra with Pauline Black & Arthur 'Gaps' Hendrickson
- "Enjoy Yourself" performed by Jools Holland & His Rhythm & Blues Orchestra with Kelly Jones, Eddi Reader, Ruby Turner, Rick Astley, Joseph, La Roux, Brittany Howard and Tom Walker

== 2020/21 edition ==
The 2020/21 Hootenanny was recorded at The Maidstone Studios, according to the credits of the programme.

=== Artists who performed on the 2020/2021 show ===
As listed on the BBC Two show website:

- Ruby Turner
- Celeste
- Sir Tom Jones
- Michael Kiwanuka
- Róisín Murphy
- Rick Wakeman
- Chris Difford

The programme also featured, as usual, Jools Holland & His Rhythm & Blues Orchestra and the 1st Battalion Scots Guards Pipes and Drums. In addition to the studio performances, there was also a look back through the Hootenanny archive at some of the best performances over the years, and Holland chatted to comedian Vic Reeves via video conference.

=== Playlist of the 2020/2021 Edition ===
- "Morning, Noon & Night" performed by Jools Holland & His Rhythm & Blues Orchestra with Ruby Turner
- "Think" performed by Jools Holland & His Rhythm & Blues Orchestra with Tom Jones
- Archive Performance from 2004/05: "Take Me Out" by Franz Ferdinand
- "Love is Back" performed by Jools Holland & His Rhythm & Blues Orchestra with Celeste
- Archive Performance from 1999/00: "Virtual Insanity" by Jamiroquai
- "Morris Dance" performed by Jools Holland & His Rhythm & Blues Orchestra
- "You Ain't the Problem" performed by Jools Holland & His Rhythm & Blues Orchestra with Michael Kiwanuka
- Archive Performance from 2017/18: "Here Comes the Girls" performed by Trombone Shorty & Orleans Avenue
- "Cool for Cats" performed by Jools Holland & His Rhythm & Blues Orchestra with Chris Difford
- "Auld Lang Syne" performed by The 1st Battalion Scots Guards with Louise Marshall
- "Well Alright" performed by Jools Holland & His Rhythm & Blues Orchestra with Ruby Turner
- Archive Performance from 2013/14: "Waiting All Night" performed by Rudimental and Ella Eyre
- "Flip, Flop and Fly" performed by Jools Holland & His Rhythm & Blues Orchestra with Tom Jones
- Archive Performance from 2007/08: "Baggy Trousers" performed by Madness
- "Let's Dance performed by Jools Holland & His Rhythm & Blues Orchestra with Róisín Murphy
- Archive Performance from 2009/10: "Bonkers" performed by Dizzee Rascal
- "It's All Right" performed by Jools Holland & His Rhythm & Blues Orchestra with Celeste
- Archive Performance from 2016/17: "The Look of Love" performed by ABC
- "Whispering Grass" performed by Jools Holland and Tom Jones
- "Lean On Me" performed by Jools Holland & His Rhythm & Blues Orchestra with Michael Kiwanuka
- Archive Performance from 2016/17: "Tilted" performed by Christine and the Queens
- "Rockin' the Boogie" performed by Jools Holland & His Rhythm & Blues Orchestra with Rick Wakeman
- Archive Performance from 2011/12: "I Need A Dollar" performed by Aloe Blacc
- "Incapable" performed by Jools Holland & His Rhythm & Blues Orchestra with Róisín Murphy
- Archive Performance from 2006/07: "Dog House Boogie" performed by Seasick Steve
- "Blue Moon" performed by Jools Holland & His Rhythm & Blues Orchestra with Tom Jones and Celeste
- "Peace in the Valley" performed by Jools Holland & His Rhythm & Blues Orchestra with Ruby Turner

== 2021/22 edition ==
The 2021/22 Hootenanny was recorded at Riverside Studios.

=== Artists who performed on the 2021/22 show ===
- Ed Sheeran
- Gregory Porter
- Lulu
- Joy Crookes
- Rag'n'Bone Man
- Yola
- Vic Reeves
- Ruby Turner

=== Archive Performances ===
- Craig David
- Madness
- Soul II Soul
- Lily Allen
- Supergrass
- Primal Scream

=== Playlist of the 2021/2022 Edition ===
- "Unchain My Heart (song)" performed by Jools Holland & His Rhythm & Blues Orchestra with Lulu
- "All I Gotta Do" performed by Jools Holland & His Rhythm & Blues Orchestra with Ruby Turner
- "Mr Holland" performed by Jools Holland & His Rhythm & Blues Orchestra with Gregory Porter
- "LDN (song)" Archive performance of originally performed in 2006 by performed by Jools Holland & His Rhythm & Blues Orchestra and Lily Allen
- "Do the Boogie" performed by Jools Holland & His Rhythm & Blues Orchestra
- "All You Ever Wanted" performed by Jools Holland & His Rhythm & Blues Orchestra and Rag 'n' Bone Man
- "Auld Lang Syne" performed by The 1st Battalion Scots Guards and Louise Marshall
- "Dizzy (Tommy Roe song)" performed by Jools Holland & His Rhythm & Blues Orchestra and Vic Reeves
- "Diamond Studded Shoes" performed by Jools Holland & His Rhythm & Blues Orchestra and Yola
- "House Of Fun" originally performed by Madness in 2007
- "Shout (Isley Brothers song)" performed by Jools Holland & His Rhythm & Blues Orchestra with Lulu
- "Shivers (Ed Sheeran song)" performed by Ed Sheeran
- "7 Days (Craig David song)" originally performed by Craig David in 2000
- "This old heart of Mine" performed by Jools Holland & His Rhythm & Blues Orchestra and Rag 'n' Bone Man
- "Alright (Supergrass song)" originally performed by Supergrass in 1995
- "My Babe" performed by Jools Holland & His Rhythm & Blues Orchestra with Gregory Porter
- "When You Were Mine" performed by Jools Holland & His Rhythm & Blues Orchestra with Joy Crookes
- "Back to Life (However Do You Want Me)" originally performed by Soul II Soul in 2017
- "The Joker and the Queen" performed by Ed Sheeran
- "Sunshine of your Love" performed by Jools Holland & His Rhythm & Blues Orchestra and Yola
- "Love Will Tear Us Apart originally performed by Hot 8 Brass Band in 2018
- "I'm a modern day apprentice for your love" performed by Jools Holland & Gregory Porter
- "Raglan Road" performed by Jools Holland & His Rhythm & Blues Orchestra, Ed Sheeran and Joy Crookes
- "Movin' on Up originally performed by Primal Scream in 2003
- "The Piano" performed by Jools Holland & His Rhythm & Blues Orchestra and Ruby Turner
- "I'm a Believer" performed by Jools Holland & His Rhythm & Blues Orchestra and Vic Reeves

== 2022/23 edition ==
The 2022/23 Hootenanny was recorded at Maidstone Studios.

=== Artists who performed on the 2022/23 show ===
- Andy Fairweather Low
- Cat Burns
- Gabrielle
- George Ezra
- Louise Marshall
- Rachael and Vilray
- Roland Gift
- Ruby Turner
- Self Esteem
- The Real Thing
- Tom Odell

=== Playlist of the 2022/2023 Edition ===
- "Good Rockin' Tonight" performed by Jools Holland & His Rhythm & Blues Orchestra
- "Roll Out Of This Hole" performed by Jools Holland & His Rhythm & Blues Orchestra with Ruby Turner
- "Children Of The Ghetto" performed by The Real Thing
- "Young And Crazy" performed by Jools Holland & His Rhythm & Blues Orchestra with Gabrielle
- "People Pleaser" performed by Cat Burns
- "Got Me A Party" performed by Jools Holland & His Rhythm & Blues Orchestra with Andy Fairweather Low
- "Auld Lang Syne" performed by The 1st Battalion Scots Guards and Louise Marshall
- "Suspicious Minds" performed by Jools Holland & His Rhythm & Blues Orchestra with Roland Gift
- "Green Green Grass" performed by Jools Holland & His Rhythm & Blues Orchestra with George Ezra
- "You To Me Are Everything" performed by The Real Thing
- "I'm Coming Out" performed by Jools Holland & His Rhythm & Blues Orchestra with Self Esteem
- "(If Paradise Is) Half as Nice" performed by Jools Holland & His Rhythm & Blues Orchestra with Andy Fairweather Low
- "Go" performed by Cat Burns
- "Dreams" performed by Jools Holland & His Rhythm & Blues Orchestra with Gabrielle
- "Do Friends Fall In Love?" performed by Rachael & Vilray
- "Good Thing" performed by Jools Holland & His Rhythm & Blues Orchestra with Roland Gift
- "Afraid To Feel" performed by Jools Holland & His Rhythm & Blues Orchestra with Louise Marshall
- "Another Love/Best Day Of My Life" performed by Tom Odell
- "Can't Get By Without You" performed by The Real Thing
- "One O'Clock Boogie" performed by Jools Holland & His Rhythm & Blues Orchestra
- "Crazy Love" performed by Jools Holland & His Rhythm & Blues Orchestra with George Ezra
- "Is A Good Man Real?" performed by Rachael & Vilray
- "The 345" performed by Jools Holland & His Rhythm & Blues Orchestra with Self Esteem
- "Stay With Me Baby" performed by Jools Holland & His Rhythm & Blues Orchestra with Ruby Turner
- "Enjoy Yourself (It's Later Than You Think)" performed by Jools Holland & His Rhythm & Blues Orchestra and guests

== 2023/24 edition ==
=== Artists who performed on the 2023/24 show ===
- Joss Stone
- Olivia Dean
- P. P. Arnold
- Paul Jones
- Raye
- Rod Stewart
- Ruby Turner
- Spider Stacy
- Sugababes
- The Mary Wallopers
- Muireann Bradley

=== Playlist of the 2023/24 Edition ===
- "Bauhaus Boogie" performed by Jools Holland & His Rhythm & Blues Orchestra
- "Them There Eyes" performed by Rod Stewart with Jools Holland & His Rhythm & Blues Orchestra
- "When the Rain Comes" performed by Sugababes
- "Blueberry Hill" performed by Ruby Turner with Jools Holland & His Rhythm & Blues Orchestra
- "The Holy Ground" performed by The Mary Wallopers
- "Pretty Flamingo" performed by Paul Jones with Jools Holland & His Rhythm & Blues Orchestra
- "Auld Lang Syne" performed by Louise Marshall and the 1st Battalion Scots Guards
- "Ain't Misbehavin'" performed by Rod Stewart with Jools Holland & His Rhythm & Blues Orchestra
- "The First Cut Is the Deepest" performed by P. P. Arnold with Jools Holland & His Rhythm & Blues Orchestra
- "Push the Button" performed by Sugababes
- "You Can't Hurry Love" performed by Olivia Dean with Jools Holland & His Rhythm & Blues Orchestra
- "Super Duper Love" performed by Joss Stone with Jools Holland & His Rhythm & Blues Orchestra
- "Bould O'Donoghue" performed by The Mary Wallopers
- "Escapism" performed by Raye with Jools Holland & His Rhythm & Blues Orchestra
- "Almost Like Being in Love" performed by Rod Stewart with Jools Holland & His Rhythm & Blues Orchestra
- "Overload" performed by Sugababes
- "Do Wah Diddy Diddy" performed by Paul Jones with Jools Holland & His Rhythm & Blues Orchestra
- "Let's Stay Together" performed by P. P. Arnold with Jools Holland & His Rhythm & Blues Orchestra
- "Candyman" performed by Muireann Bradley
- "Some Kind of Wonderful" performed by Joss Stone with Jools Holland & His Rhythm & Blues Orchestra
- "Dive" performed by Olivia Dean with Jools Holland & His Rhythm & Blues Orchestra
- "Streams of Whiskey" performed by The Mary Wallopers with Spider Stacy
- "Night Train" performed by Rod Stewart with Jools Holland & His Rhythm & Blues Orchestra
- "Mad About the Boy" performed by Raye with Jools Holland & His Rhythm & Blues Orchestra
- "Enjoy Yourself (It's Later than You Think)" performed by Jools Holland & His Rhythm & Blues Orchestra with guests

== 2024/25 edition ==
The show was recorded at The Maidstone Studios in Kent on December 18.

=== Artists who performed on the 2024/25 show ===
As per the BBC's programme page:

- The Boomtown Rats
- CMAT
- Jade Thirlwall
- Jungle
- Kathy Sledge
- Marc Almond
- Paul Carrack
- Roger Taylor
- Ruby Turner
- Toby Lee
- The Dead South

=== Playlist of the 2024/25 Edition ===
- "T−hem That Speak Don't Know" by Jools Holland & His Rhythm & Blues Orchestra
- "Let's Go Back" performed by Jungle
- "Promise Me" performed by Kathy Sledge with Jools Holland & His Rhythm & Blues Orchestra
- "Have Fun!" performed by CMAT with Jools Holland & His Rhythm & Blues Orchestra
- "She's So Modern" performed by The Boomtown Rats
- "Blow Top Blues" performed by Ruby Turner with Jools Holland & His Rhythm & Blues Orchestra
- "Auld Lang Syne" performed by Louise Marshall and the 1st Battalion Scots Guards
- "We Are Family" performed by Kathy Sledge with Jools Holland & His Rhythm & Blues Orchestra
- "Keep A-Knockin'/Tutti Frutti" performed by Roger Taylor with Jools Holland & His Rhythm & Blues Orchestra
- "Rat Trap" performed by The Boomtown Rats
- "Hot Stuff/Knock on Wood" performed by Jade Thirlwall with Jools Holland & His Rhythm & Blues Orchestra
- "Back on 74" performed by Jungle
- "Over My Shoulder" performed by Paul Carrack with Jools Holland & His Rhythm & Blues Orchestra
- "House on Fire" performed by Toby Lee with Jools Holland & His Rhythm & Blues Orchestra
- "Say Hello, Wave Goodbye" performed by Marc Almond with Jools Holland & His Rhythm & Blues Orchestra
- "A Little Devil/20 Mile Jump" performed by The Dead South
- "Under Pressure" performed by Roger Taylor and Louise Marshall with Jools Holland & His Rhythm & Blues Orchestra
- "Thinking of You" performed by Kathy Sledge with Jools Holland & His Rhythm & Blues Orchestra
- "I'm Gonna Move to the Outskirts of Town" performed by Paul Carrack with Jools Holland & His Rhythm & Blues Orchestra
- "Busy Earnin'" performed by Jungle
- "Fantasy" performed by Jade Thirlwall with Jools Holland & His Rhythm & Blues Orchestra
- "Elusive Butterfly" performed by Marc Almond with Jools Holland & His Rhythm & Blues Orchestra
- "I Don't Like Mondays" performed by The Boomtown Rats
- "Without You" performed by CMAT with Jools Holland & His Rhythm & Blues Orchestra
- "Enjoy Yourself (It's Later than You Think)" performed by Jools Holland & His Rhythm & Blues Orchestra and Ruby Turner with guests

== 2025/26 edition ==
The 2025/26 edition was recorded at Versa London Studios.

=== Artists performing on the 2025/26 show ===
As per the BBC's programme page:

- Ronnie Wood
- Olivia Dean
- Lulu
- Jessie J
- Craig David
- Heather Small
- The Kooks
- Imelda May
- Joe Webb
- David Hermlin
- Ruby Turner

=== Playlist of the 2025/26 Edition ===
- "'Tain't What You Do (It's the Way That You Do It)" performed by Jools Holland and his Rhythm & Blues Orchestra
- "Mother of Pearl" performed by Ronnie Wood and Imelda May with Jools Holland and his Rhythm & Blues Orchestra
- "Sunny Baby" performed by The Kooks
- "Living My Best Life" performed by Jessie J with Jools Holland and his Rhythm & Blues Orchestra
- "Nice to Each Other" performed by Olivia Dean
- "Flip, Flop and Fly" performed by Ruby Turner with Jools Holland and his Rhythm & Blues Orchestra
- "Auld Lang Syne" performed by Louise Marshall and the 1st Battalion Scots Guards
- "Relight My Fire" performed by Lulu with Jools Holland and his Rhythm & Blues Orchestra
- "Now or Never" performed by Imelda May with Jools Holland and his Rhythm & Blues Orchestra
- "Naïve" performed by The Kooks
- "Moving On Up" performed by Heather Small with Jools Holland and his Rhythm & Blues Orchestra
- "Fill Me In/7 Days" performed by Craig David with Fraser T. Smith
- "This Will Be (An Everlasting Love)" performed by Olivia Dean with Jools Holland and his Rhythm & Blues Orchestra
- "Jeepers Creepers" performed by David Hermlin with Jools Holland and his Rhythm & Blues Orchestra
- "Ooh La La" performed by Ronnie Wood and Jools Holland
- "She Moves in Her Own Way" performed by The Kooks
- "The Man Who Sold the World" performed by Lulu with Jools Holland and his Rhythm & Blues Orchestra
- "Big Bad Handsome Man" performed by Imelda May with Jools Holland and his Rhythm & Blues Orchestra
- "Search for the Hero" performed by Heather Small with Jools Holland and his Rhythm & Blues Orchestra
- "Man I Need" performed by Olivia Dean
- "My Way" performed by Jessie J with Jools Holland and his Rhythm & Blues Orchestra
- "Black Eyes" performed by Joe Webb and Jools Holland
- "Rain" performed by Craig David with Fraser T. Smith
- "You're So Fine" performed by Ronnie Wood and Imelda May with Jools Holland and his Rhythm & Blues Orchestra
- "Enjoy Yourself (It's Later than You Think)" performed by Jools Holland and his Rhythm & Blues Orchestra and Ruby Turner with guests

== Reception ==
A 2010 episode of the sitcom Peep Show showed the protagonists on New Year's Eve worrying about ageing out of the party lifestyle, saying "No, not the Hootenanny. Never the Hootenanny. We're better than that!".

In 2025, Emily Baker wrote in the i that "the Hootenanny has lost its cool. It can’t pull in the big stars it once used to and now has to rely on the has-beens who are already over-exposed."
