= Swing Fever (album) =

2024 studio collab album by Rod Stewart with Jools Holland

Studio album by Rod Stewart with Jools Holland
- Released: 23 February 2024
- Studios: Helicon Mountain; Durrington House; Red Cottage
- Genre: Swing
- Length: 38:17
- Label: Warner
- Producers: Phil Manzanera; Nitin Sawhney

Rod Stewart chronology
The Tears of Hercules (2021)	Swing Fever (2024)	Ultimate Hits (2025)

Jools Holland chronology
Pianola. Piano & Friends (2021)	Swing Fever (2024)

Swing Fever is a collaborative album by British singer Rod Stewart and English composer Jools Holland, released on 23 February 2024. It features Holland's Rhythm and Blues Orchestra, and contains covers of songs from the big band era.

== Critical reception ==
Professional ratings
Review scores
Source	Rating
AllMusic	4/5 stars
Hot Press	7.5/10
i	2/5 stars
The Telegraph	4/5 stars
The Clinch Review	(Positive)

Stephen Thomas Erlewine of AllMusic described it as "a record steeped in jump blues, boogie woogie, and other manners of swinging R&B. In form, it's not far removed from Stewart's Great American Songbook albums, generally relying on songs written prior to the onset of rock & roll". Neil McCormick of The Telegraph found that "together Stewart and Holland tackle these classic tunes as if they are trying to set fire to the ballroom and burn the old folk's home to the ground" as "while there's nothing radical or new here, joy always sounds fresh, and Stewart sounds like he's having the time of his life".

Jackie Hayden of Hot Press stated that "Stewart's age-worn and smoky voice can still deliver, as these 13 covers of classic big band numbers prove", writing that Holland "is no slouch either" with his contributions to "Sentimental Journey", "Them There Eyes" and "Frankie and Johnny". Ed Power of i felt that "to take the attention away from Rod Stewart without once opening your mouth is quite an achievement. That's what Holland does throughout a vigorous yet subtly deficient collection."

== Commercial performance ==
On the UK Albums Chart dated 1 March 2024, the album debuted at number one, which made it Holland's first number-one album and Stewart's 11th.

== Track listing ==
Swing Fever track listing
No.	Title	Writer(s)	Arranger(s)	Length
1.	"Lullaby of Broadway"	Harry Warren; Al Dubin	Derek Nash	5:02
2.	"Oh Marie"	Eduardo di Capua; Vincenzo Russo; Louis Prima; Alfredo Mazzuchi	Nash	2:33
3.	"Sentimental Journey"	Les Brown; Bud Green; Ben Homer	Fayyaz Virji	2:54
4.	"Pennies from Heaven"	Johnny Burke; Arthur Johnston	Nash	2:58
5.	"Night Train"	Oscar Washington; James R. Forrest; Lewis C. Simpkins	Jonathan Scott	2:56
6.	"Love Is the Sweetest Thing"	Ray Noble; Charles Wilmott	Jools Holland; Phil Veacock	2:55
7.	"Them There Eyes"	Maceo Pinkard; Doris Tauber; William G. Tracey	Nash	2:24
8.	"Good Rockin' Tonight"	Roy Brown	Scott	2:50
9.	"Ain't Misbehavin'"	Andy Razaf; Harry Brooks; Thomas Fats Waller	Holland; Veacock	2:26
10.	"Frankie and Johnny"	Traditional	Rod Stewart; Veacock	3:02
11.	"Walkin' My Baby Back Home"	Roy Turk; Fred E. Ahlert	Veacock	2:18
12.	"Almost Like Being in Love"	Alan Jay Lerner; Frederick Loewe	Nash	2:39
13.	"Tennessee Waltz"	Pee Wee King; Redd Stewart	Nash	3:20
Total length:				38:17

== Personnel ==
Musicians

- Rod Stewart – vocals
- Jools Holland – acoustic piano
- Christopher Holland – organ
- Mark Flanagan – guitar
- Gary Potter – guitar (3, 6, 12)
- Dave Swift – bass
- Gilson Lavis – drums
- Oli Savill – percussion (1, 2, 5, 7–9)
- Lya Reis Guerrero – percussion (3, 6, 12)
- Karl Vanden Bossche – percussion (4, 10, 11, 13)
- Matt O'Connor – congas (13), tambourine (13)
- Nick Lunt – baritone saxophone
- Michael Rose – saxophone
- Phil Veacock – saxophone
- Anna Brooks – saxophone (1, 3–7, 9–13)
- Derek Nash – saxophone (1, 3–5, 7–11, 13)
- Lisa Grahame – saxophone (2, 8)
- Pete Long – saxophone (3, 6, 12)
- Courtney Brown – trombone
- Roger Goslyn – trombone
- Winston Rollins – trombone
- Alistair White – trombone (1, 5, 7, 9)
- Fayyaz Virji – trombone (2–4, 6, 8, 10–13)
- Jason McDermid – trumpet
- Jonathan Scott – trumpet
- Chris Storr – trumpet (1–3, 5–9, 12)
- Enrico Tomasso – trumpet (1, 2, 4, 5, 7–11, 13)
- Danny Marsden – trumpet (3, 6, 12)
- Nathan Bray – trumpet (4, 10, 11, 13)
- Holly Brewer – backing vocals (1, 3–9, 11, 12)
- Gemma Mewse – backing vocals (1, 3–9, 11, 12)
- Amanda Miller – backing vocals (1, 4, 7, 11, 12)
- Ollie Furness – backing vocals (2)
- John H. Fitch Jr. – backing vocals (2)
- Richard Taylor – backing vocals (2)
- Joanne Harper – backing vocals (3, 5, 6, 8, 9)

Tap dancing on "Lullaby of Broadway"

- Genevieve Bennett
- Michael Burr
- Toria Ford
- Molly Goodman
- Courtney Jackson
- Lucy Mancinetti
- Amanda Miller
- Lucy Parsons
- Liam Tistell

Music arrangements

- Rod Stewart – BGV arrangements (1–9, 11, 12)
- Derek Nash – arrangements (1, 2, 4, 7, 12, 13)
- Fayyaz Virji – arrangements (3)
- Jonathan Scott – arrangements (5, 8)
- Jools Holland – arrangements (6, 9)
- Phil Veacock – arrangements (6, 9–11)

== Production ==
- Phil Manzanera – producer (1, 3, 5, 6, 9, 12)
- Nitin Sawhney – producer (4, 10, 11, 13)
- Kevin Savigar – vocal production, mixing
- James Stewart – lead recording engineer
- Michael Boddy – mixing (1–10, 12, 13)
- Harry Timson – engineer (4, 10, 11, 13), orchestra mixing (11)
- George Latham – assistant engineer
- Patrick Logue – assistant engineer
- Alex Wharton – mastering at Abbey Road Studios (London, UK)
- Penny Lancaster – photography production and direction
- Jonas Mohr – photography
- Salvador Design – artwork
- Stephen Taylor – tour manager
- Elena Bello and Paul Losby for One Fifteen – management for Jools Holland
- Lotus Donovan – management for Rod Stewart

== Charts ==
Chart performance for Swing Fever
Chart (2024)	Peak position
Australian Albums (ARIA)	19
Austrian Albums (Ö3 Austria)	4
Belgian Albums (Ultratop Flanders)	26
Belgian Albums (Ultratop Wallonia)	139
Croatian International Albums (HDU)	30
German Albums (Offizielle Top 100)	4
Hungarian Albums (MAHASZ)	20
Irish Albums (Official Charts)	45
Japanese Albums (Oricon)	48
Japanese Hot Albums (Billboard Japan)	73
Portuguese Albums (AFP)	63
Scottish Albums (Official Charts)	2
Spanish Albums (Promusicae)	63
Swiss Albums (Schweizer Hitparade)	5
UK Albums (Official Charts)	1

== Certifications ==
Region	Certification	Certified units/sales
United Kingdom (BPI)	Silver	60,000^{‡}
^{‡} Sales+streaming figures based on certification alone.
