= Christopher Holland =

English keyboardist, singer, songwriter

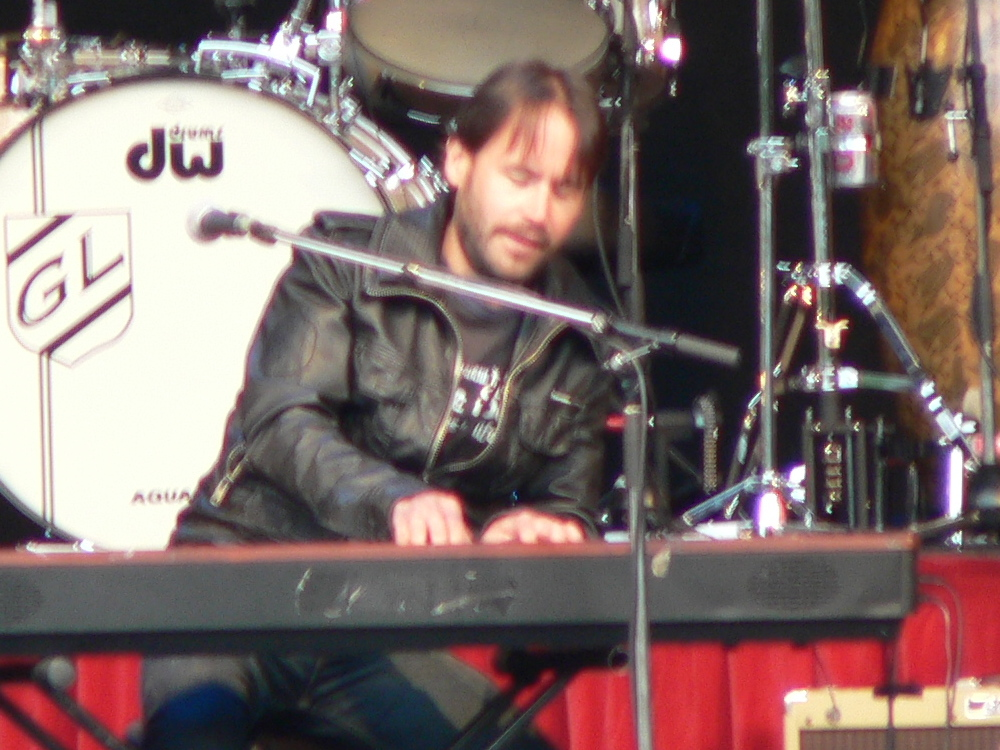
- Holland playing as support act to Jools Holland in Thetford Forest (2009)

Background information
- Born: Christopher William Holland
- Genres: Pop; blues; R&B
- Occupations: Musician; singer; songwriter
- Instruments: Piano; keyboards; vocals
- Years active: 1982–present

Christopher William Holland is an English keyboard player, singer and songwriter. He is the younger brother of pianist and band-leader Jools Holland.

== Career ==
Holland left school at 16 to concentrate on his first band, B Sharp, with twin brother Richard on drums and school friend Lisa Covington on guitar. They were signed to Miles Copeland's label I.R.S. Records in the early 1980s, toured the UK and released two singles with producers Pascal Gabriel and Dennis Herring before going their separate ways. In between working on his own music, Holland has also toured and recorded with Green On Red, Squeeze, Paul Weller, Stereophonics, Ray Davies and performed with his elder brother Jool's Rhythm and Blues Orchestra.

His first solo album, Cosmic Harmony Companion (on Beautiful Records BT003CD), was released in 1999 in limited numbers to sell at shows and contains some of his earliest compositions, featuring various guest musicians including Pino Palladino and Rico Rodriguez. A follow-up studio album Brother Sun Sister Moon (BT004CD), was issued in the summer of 2003 part produced with Laurie Latham and featuring Sam Brown on backing vocals and Ash Soan on drums.

Continuing to tour throughout 2004 with his band Cosmic Harmony, as well as playing solo shows, he released a one-off project with ex-B sharp member Lisa Covington, using a range of vintage keyboards, moog wurlitzer clavinet mellotron entitled Butterfly Effect and was released in (2005).

During 2006 and 2007, Holland was in the recording studio again, working on thirteen new songs featuring Edwina Hayes on vocals and Melvyn Duffy on lap–pedal steel guitar and Ash Soan on drums. The ensuing Everything You Can Imagine Is Real was released in 2007.

Between 2008 and 2012 while continuing to perform with the Rhythm and Blues orchestra and with the help of sound engineer Ron Box, Chris worked away on a double album titled 'Corner Green' which was released in 2012 on Holland's own Cosmic Harmony Records label.

During 2017 and 2018 Chris was in the studio again working on 14 new self penned/produced songs, including a co -write with Chris Difford and featuring guest vocalists Sumudu Jayatilaka Siobhan Parr and Katy Shotter with Ash Soan and Jim Kimberley on drums Dave Swift and Ron Box guitars and mixing duties Golden Hour was released in 2019 with photography by Christie Goodwin.

In 2020 Chris wrote and recorded a new charity single for Songs of Isolation album raising money for NHS Heroes, titled Great Awakening raising thousands of pounds for NHS frontline workers.

2021 saw the release of a second 'lockdown' song and single dedicated to the passing of his mother titled "Thank You for the Love" with proceeds being donated to Alzheimer's Research UK.

== Discography ==
This is a list of the albums Holland has appeared on:

- Squeeze – Cosi Fan Tutti Frutti (1985)
- Green On Red – Live at the T and C (1989)
- Green On Red – Too Much Fun (1992)
- Jools Holland R & B Orchestra – Live Performance (1994)
- Jools Holland R & B Orchestra – Sex & Jazz & Rock & Roll (1996)
- Jools Holland R & B Orchestra – Lift The Lid (1997)
- Jools Holland R & B Orchestra – Best Of (1998)
- Squeeze – Domino (1998)
- Jools Holland R & B Orchestra – Sunset Over London (1999)
- 'Christopher Holland' – 'Cosmic Harmony Companion' (1999)
- Sam Brown – ReBoot (2000)
- Jools Holland R & B Orchestra – Hop The Wag (2000)
- Paul Weller (DVD) Live at Albert Hall (2000)
- Glenn Tilbrook – The Incomplete (2001)
- Jools Holland – The Swing Album (2001)
- Christopher Holland – Hoopatasso (2001)
- Jools Holland R & B Orchestra – Small World Big Band (2001)
- Stereophonics – "Handbags and Gladrags" (2002)
- Jools Holland R & B Orchestra – SWBB Volume Two: More Friends (2002)
- Squeeze – Big Squeeze: The Very Best Of Squeeze (2002)
- Christopher Holland – Brother Sun Sister Moon (2003)
- Jools Holland R & B Orchestra – Jack O The Green (SWBB Friends 3) (2003)
- Christopher Holland's Cosmic Harmony – Butterfly Effect (2004)
- Jools Holland – Tom Jones and Jools Holland (2003)
- Jimmy Scott – Someone To Watch Over Me (2004)
- The Fields – Down The Wire (2004)
- Jools Holland R & B Orchestra' – Swinging the Blues, Dancing the Ska (2005)
- 'Sam Brown' – Best Of (2005)
- Ray Davies – "Thanksgiving Day" (2005)
- 'Chris Difford' – Songs from the Weald (2006)
- 'Jools Holland R & B Orchestra' – Moving Out to the Country (2006)
- 'Christopher Holland' – Everything You Can Imagine Is Real (2007)
- 'Jools Holland' – 'Best of Friends' (2007)
- 'Jools Holland' – 'The informer' – (2008)
- 'Ruby Turner' – 'I'm travelling on' – (2009)
- 'Tom Jones' – 'Praise and Blame' – (2010)
- 'Jools Holland' – 'Rocking Horse' – (2011)
- 'Christopher Holland' – 'Corner Green' – (Aug 2012)
- 'Jools Holland' – 'Golden Age Of Song' Dec (2012)
- 'Ethan Johns' – 'If Not Now When' (Feb 2013)
- 'Christopher Holland'- 'Golden Hour'(Nov 2019)
