= Toby Lee =

Toby Lee may refer to:

- Toby Lee (guitarist), British guitarist
- Toby Lee (actor), Taiwanese actor
- Toby Lee, a brand of shirts, sponsors of Toby Lee Series, an Australian motor racing series
