= Nørgaard =

Nørgaard [ˈnœɐ̯kɒː] is a Danish surname, literally meaning north farm. Note that the double a is equivalent of å in common nouns and is retained from the pre-1948 orthography in proper nouns only. A parallel form is Nørregaard.

Nørgaard or Nørregaard may refer to:

- Asta Nørregaard, Norwegian artist
- Bjørn Nørgaard, Danish artist
- Carsten Norgaard, Danish actor
- Chloe Nørgaard, Danish and American model
- Christian Nørgaard, Danish footballer
- Hjalte Nørregaard, Danish footballer
- Kari Norgaard, American sociologist
- Lise Nørgaard (1917–2023), Danish journalist
- Per Nørgård, Danish composer
- Richard B. Norgaard, Retired Prof. of Ecology & Economics at UC Berkeley
