= Sharpsichord =

Musical instrument

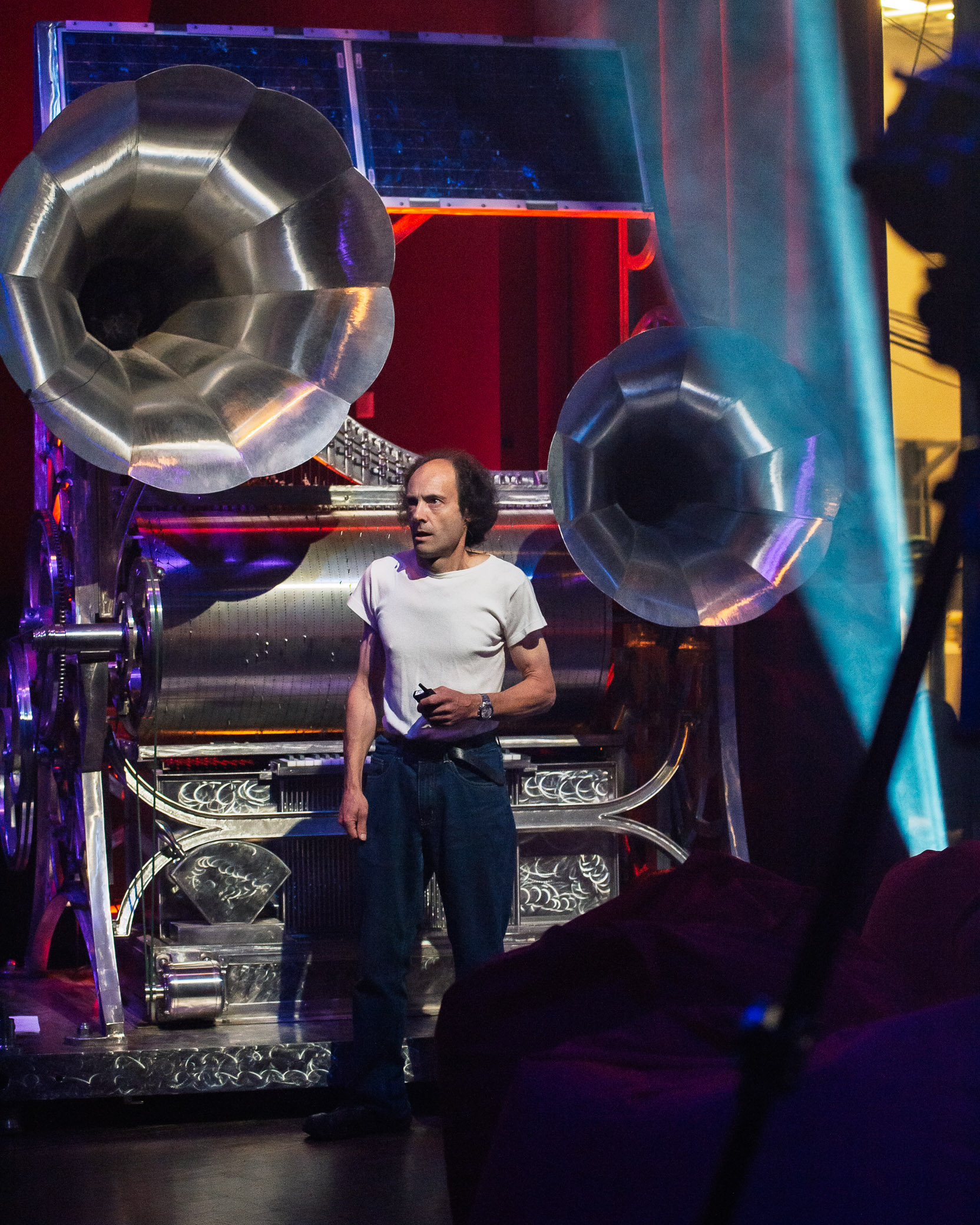
- Henry Dagg and the Sharpsichord at TEDxArendal, Norway, 2016; Photo: Birgit Fostervold

String instrument
- Classification: Chordophone
- Inventor: Henry Dagg
- Developed: 21st century

Musicians
- Björk

The Sharpsichord is a musical instrument created by Henry Dagg in Faversham, Kent. It is a pin-barrel harp or Stroh Harpsichord that plays music using a system of pegs, like a music box. The pegs slot into a grid of 11,520 holes to program songs onto a 46-string harp using a chromatic scale of almost 4 octaves from C2 to A5 (the 47th Lever activates dampers for the lowest strings when changing Chords). The harp is then amplified by a pair of large horns very akin to a Stroh violin which also uses Horns to amplify its sound. The instrument can also be played more traditionally using a keyboard. The Sharpsichord is solar-powered and can play 90 seconds of music at a time. It is made of stainless steel and weighs 2,500 kilograms (5,500 lb) altogether. Dagg has stated that the Sharpsichord is intended as a tribute to Cecil Sharp, a collector of folk music.

It took around four years for Dagg to create the Sharpsichord after he was enabled to do so following a commission from the English Folk Dance and Song Society in 2006. The society asked Dagg to create a trio of instruments to use in a "sound garden" following a grant from the Big Lottery Fund. Dagg only produced one instrument: the Sharpsichord. Due to the Sharpsichord being perishable it was not able to be used in the garden and Dagg later had to refund the money. The instrument took a total of £90,000 to build. The Sharpsichord was used by Björk on her Biophilia tour for the song Sacrifice.
