= Derek Nash (musician) =

British jazz saxophonist

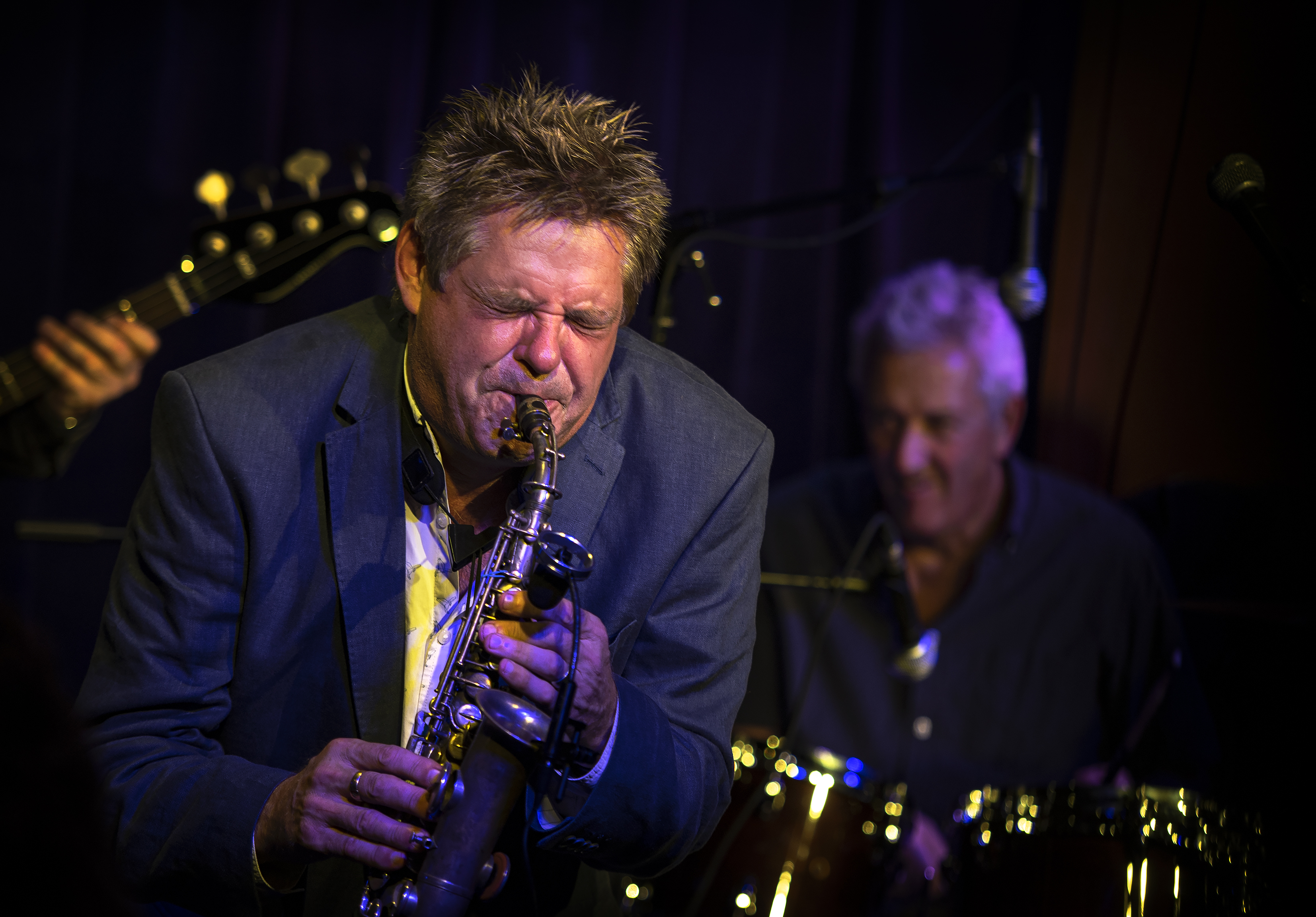

Background information
- Born: July 28, 1961 (age 65); Stockport, England
- Genres: Jazz
- Occupations: Saxophonist, recording engineer
- Instrument: Saxophone
- Years active: circa 1982–present

Derek Nash (born 28 July 1961) is a British jazz saxophonist, band leader, arranger and recording engineer.

For over forty years, Nash has led Sax Appeal, which won the John Dankworth Award for Ensemble in the 1998 B.T. Jazz Awards, and subsequently the British Jazz Award for best small group in 2000. He Leads the Derek Nash Acoustic Quartet that features David Newton on piano, Geoff Gascoyne on bass and Sebastiaan de Krom on drums ( British Jazz award for best CD in 2012). He also leads the funk/fusion band Protect the Beat and Latin band PICANTE.

Nash has been a member of the Jools Holland Rhythm and Blues Orchestra since 2004. He has arranged big band charts for many artists including Nile Rogers, Jamie Cullum, Jose Feliciano, Van Mossison, Lulu, Gregory Porter, Chaka Khan, Boz Scaggs, and Paloma Faith, and he arranged six of the tracks on the No.1 album "Swing Fever" featuring Sir Rod Stewart released in 2024 including the Radio 2 Playlisted "Pennies from Heaven" and "Almost like Being in Love".

He is a member of the Ronnie Scotts Blues Explosion, and has performed regularly at the venue for over 20 years.

This band became the touring and recording band for Jack Bruce and he features on the album Silver Roads and Jack Bruce and his Big Blues Band.

He co-leads "The Wonder of Stevie" show, a celebration of the music of Stevie Wonder with vocalist Noel McCalla, and released an album Some Kinda Wonderful - The music of Stevie Wonder in 2021.

After studying electroacoustics at Salford University, Nash became a sound engineer at the BBC in 1982, leaving in 2002 to become a full-time musician and to set up his own Clowns Pocket Recording Studio.

Derek Nash's Clowns Pocket Recording Studio has been used by many British musicians to record, mix and master albums including Jamie Cullum, George Melly, Stan Tracey, Tony Remy, Georgie Fame, Dave O'Higgins, Evelina De Lain, Geoff Gascoyne and many others.

Nash has performed with David Sanborn, Sir Rod Stewart, John Dankworth, Dick Morrissey, Spike Robinson, Humphrey Lyttelton, Sir Paul McCartney, Eric Clapton, Solomon Burke, Annie Lennox, Eddie Floyd, Madeleine Peyroux, Roger Daltrey, Eddi Reader, Tom Jones, Don Grusin, Dave Grusin, John Etheridge, Russell Ferrante, Nelson Rangell, Snake Davis, Bob Dorough, Oscar Castro Neves, Clare Teal, Jamie Cullum, Alan Barnes, Axel Zwingenberger, Dave Green, Charlie Watts, George Melly, Bob Dorough, Shakatak, Lulu, India Arie, Alison Moyet, Clark Tracey, Alec Dankworth, Ben Waters, Digby Fairweather and Jools Holland.

The album he recorded with Spike Robinson, Young Lions, Old Tigers (2000), was named Best Jazz CD of the Year, a feat repeated in 2012 with his Joyriding album by the Derek Nash Acoustic Quartet. Both albums are released on JAZZIZIT Records and Nash is a co-director of the label.

== Awards ==
- Best Jazz CD of the Year for Joyriding with the Derek Nash Acoustic Quartet (2012)
- Best Jazz CD of the Year for Young Lions, Old Tigers with Spike Robinson (2002)
- British Jazz Award (Small Group) for Sax Appeal (2000)
- John Dankworth Award for Ensemble in the B.T. Jazz awards (1998)

=== Nominations ===
- Nominated for British Jazz Award Alto Saxophone 2019 (3rd)
- Nominated for British Jazz Award Alto Saxophone 2017 (4th)
- Nominated for British Jazz Award Alto Saxophone 2016 (4th)
- Nominated for British Jazz Award Alto Saxophone 2015 (4th)
- Nominated for British Jazz Award Alto Saxophone 2014 (5th)
- Nominated for Jazz Musician of the Year by the Global Music Foundation and voted in the Top 3 Alto Saxophonists in the 2010 British Jazz Awards.

== Discography ==
=== As leader/co-leader ===
- 2019: Down On Frenchmen Street – with Dave Newton, Geoff Gascoyne and Sebastiaan de Krom (Plus guest Martin Shaw)
- 2015: You've Got To Dig It To Dig It, You Dig? – with Dave Newton, Geoff Gascoyne and Sebastiaan de Krom (Plus guest Martin Shaw)
- 2012: Joyriding with Dave Newton, Geoff Gascoyne and Sebastiaan de Krom (Plus guests Martin Shaw and Winston Rollins)
- 2009: Snapshot – with Jan Lundgren, Geoff Gascoyne and Steve Brown
- 2000: Young Lions, Old Tigers – with Spike Robinson, Pete Cater, Nick Weldon, Rob Rickenberg
- 1998: Setting New Standards – with Clark Tracey, Alec Dankworth and Graham Harvey

With Sax Appeal

- 2018: Big Bad Trouble
- 2014: Funkerdeen
- 2006: The Flatiron Suite
- 2000: Take No Prisoners
- 1997: Outside In
- 1994: Let's Go
- 1991: Flat Out

With Protect the Beat

- 2007: Intrepid - with Darby Todd, Winston Blissett, Tim Cansfield, Arden Hart
- 2002: It Ain't Dinner Jazz - with Darby Todd, Winston Blissett, Tony Smith, Pete Adams

With PICANTE

- 2019: Bim Bam Bom - with Dominic Ashworth, NeiL Angilley, Andy Staples, Marc Cecil, Chris Storr, Robin Jones, Satin Singh, Noel McCalla and Louise Marshall
- 2015: Five Note Salsa - with Dominic Ashworth, Neil Angilley, Geoff Gascoyne, Marc Cecil, Chris Storr and Louise Marshall

With SOME KINDA WONDERFUL

- 2021: The Music Of Stevie Wonder - with Noel McCalla, Neil Angilley, Tim Cansfield, Jonathan Noyce and Nic France

=== As sideman ===
With the Jools Holland Rhythm and Blues Orchestra

- "Swing Fever" 2024 (with Sir Rod Stewart)
- "Pianola" 2021
- "A Lovely Life To Live" 2018 (with Marc Almond)
- "As You See Me Now" 2017
- "Piano" 2016
- "Jools and Ruby" 2015 (with Ruby Turner)
- "Sirens of Song" 2014
- "The Golden Age of Song" 2012
- "Rockinghorse" 2010
- "The Informer" 2008
- "Best of Friends" 2007
- "Moving Out to the Country" 2006
- "Swinging the Blues, Dancing the Ska" 2005
- "Tom Jones and Jools Holland" 2004

With Ben Waters

- Shakin' in the Makin'
- Hurricane
- Boogie for Stu

With Shakatak

- Eyes of the World 2024
- In The Blue Zone 2019
