= Them There Eyes =

1930 popular music song

Single by Louis Armstrong
- B-side: "When You're Smiling"
- Published: 1930
- Released: 1931
- Genre: Jazz
- Length: 3:09
- Label: Odeon
- Songwriters: Maceo Pinkard; Doris Tauber; William Tracey

"Them There Eyes" is a jazz song written by Maceo Pinkard, Doris Tauber, and William Tracey that was published in 1930. One of the early recorded versions was performed by Louis Armstrong in 1931. It was made famous by Billie Holiday, who recorded her version in 1939 for Vocalion Records.

== Notable versions ==
- Bing Crosby (recorded November 20, 1930, as the Rhythm Boys with Gus Arnheim and his Cocoanut Grove Orchestra.) This was popular and reached the charts of the day in 1931.
- A version by Emile Ford & the Checkmates reached number 18 on the UK Singles Chart in 1960.
- Rod Stewart released a cover version of the song together with Jools Holland on the album Swing Fever in 2024.
