= Jools Holland and his Rhythm & Blues Orchestra =

Jools Holland's backing band

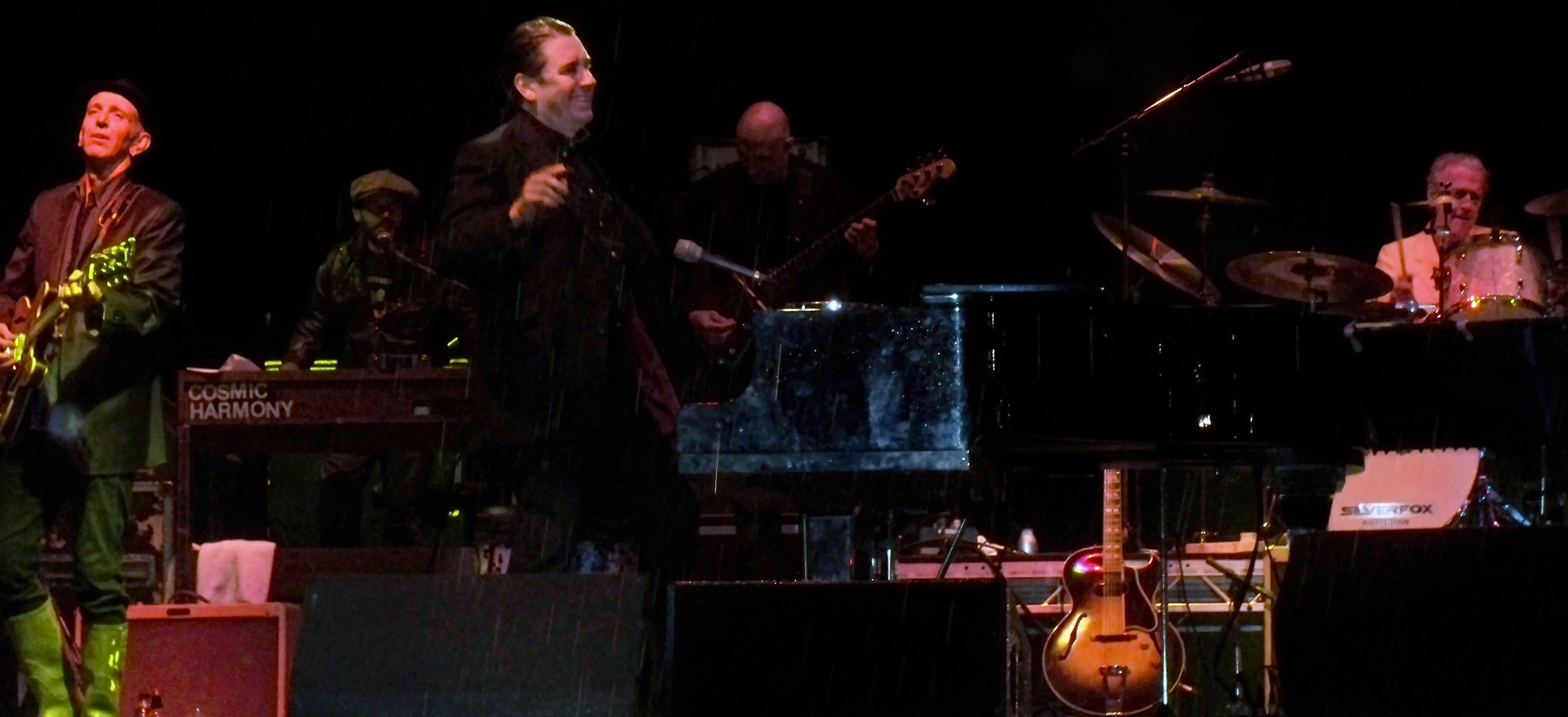
- Jools Holland's R&B Orchestra performing at GuilFest 2012

Background information
- Origin: London, England
- Genres: Rhythm and blues; jump blues; swing revival; ska
- Years active: 1987–present
- Spinoff of: Squeeze
- Members: Jools Holland; Ruby Turner; Louise Marshall; Mabel Ray; Mark Flanagan; Dave Swift; Christopher Holland; Phil Veacock; Michael Rose; Derek Nash; Nick Lunt; Roger Goslyn; Fayyaz Virji; Winston Rollins; Jason McDermid; Jon Scott
- Past members: Sam Brown; Lisa Grahame; Gilson Lavis; Pete Long; Rosie Mae; Rico Rodriguez; Chris Storr
- Website: joolsholland.com/orchestra.htm

Jools Holland and his Rhythm & Blues Orchestra (also known as Jools Holland's Rhythm and Blues Orchestra) is an English rhythm and blues band led by boogie-woogie and former Squeeze pianist and television personality Jools Holland.

== History ==
Holland formed the band in 1987. In May 2022, the 17-piece band consisted of piano, organ, drums, female vocals, electric guitar, bass guitar, alto saxophones, tenor saxophones, baritone saxophones, trumpets, and trombones.

== Current members ==
- Jools Holland—piano, guitar, vocals
- Ruby Turner—vocals
- Louise Marshall—vocals
- Mabel Ray—vocals, backing vocals
- Ed Richardson—drums, percussion
- Mark Flanagan—guitar, backing vocals
- Dave Swift—bass
- Christopher Holland—organ, piano, backing vocals
- Phil Veacock—saxophone, backing vocals
- Michael "Bammi" Rose – saxophone, backing vocals
- Derek Nash—saxophone, backing vocals
- Nick Lunt—baritone saxophone, backing vocals
- Roger Goslyn—trombone, backing vocals
- Fayyaz Virji—trombone, backing vocals
- Winston Rollins—trombone, backing vocals
- Jason McDermid—trumpet, backing vocals
- Jon Scott—trumpet, backing vocals

=== Previous members ===
- Gilson Lavis–drums (1987–2024)
- Rico Rodriguez–trombone, vocals and backing vocals (1996–2012)
