= Toby Lee (guitarist) =

British guitarist

- Born: 27 January 2005 (age 21); Warwickshire, England
- Genres: Blues; soul; R&B; pop rock; blues rock; rock and roll
- Occupation: Musician
- Instruments: Guitar
- Years active: 2010–present
- Website: toby-lee.com

Toby Lee (born 27 January 2005) is a British guitarist. He appeared on the television shows Little Big Shots and The Ellen Show, and he starred in the musical School of Rock. At eight years old he taught himself how to play. He became a global sensation after playing guitar at B.B. King's Blues Club in 2015, when he was ten years old.

== Career ==
Toby Lee posted a tribute video to B.B. King when he was 10 years old. The video went viral and Lee developed a following. After he gained a following on YouTube and on Facebook his career began to take shape. Toby Lee has had 350 million views on YouTube. Lee is now sponsored by Gibson Guitars.

In 2016, he played Zack in School Of Rock at the New London Theatre. In 2017 he performed the blues with Ronnie Baker Brooks at the Blues Heaven Festival in Denmark, and the video amassed over 115 million views on Facebook within a year. In 2019, Lee played with Joe Bonamassa at the Royal Albert Hall. Lee is playing on an upcoming Peter Frampton album.

Joe Bonamassa has called Toby Lee "a future superstar of the blues". Some refer to him as the "future of the blues". He performed on the 2024/25 edition of Jools' Annual Hootenanny.

== Awards ==
- Young Blues Artist of the Year at the UK Blues Awards (2018)
- Bob Harris Emerging Artist Award at the UK Americana Music Awards (2025)

== Albums ==
- EP "10" (2017)
- Aquarius (2021)
- Icons Vol. 1 (2022) – covers album
- House on Fire (2024)
