= Henry Dagg =

British musician

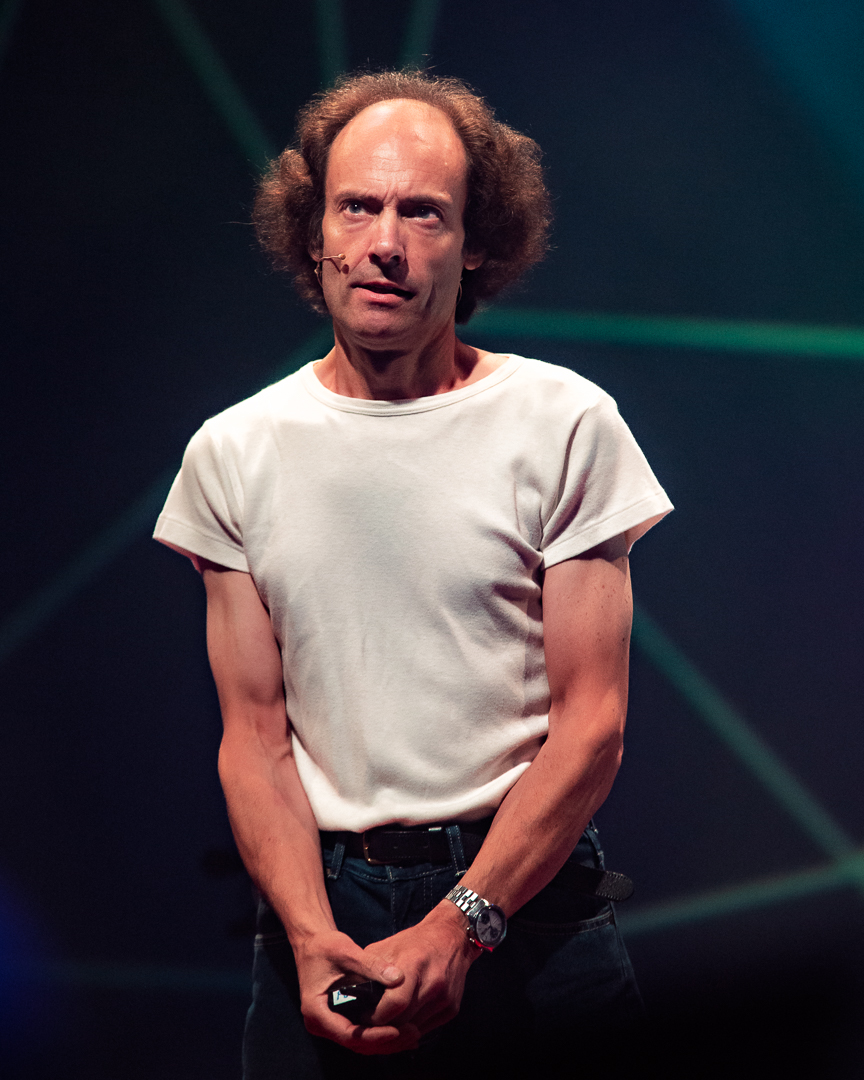
Henry Dagg at TEDxArendal, Norway, 2016

Henry Dagg is a sound sculptor and builder of experimental musical instruments who formerly worked as a sound engineer for the BBC. His works include a pin barrel harp or sharpsichord which was commissioned for the English Folk Dance and Song Society, a pair of steel sculptural musical gates for Rochester Independent College and an artificial "cat organ" (using squeaky toys in place of actual cats), which he played to the amusement of an audience of celebrities at a garden party hosted by Prince Charles.
