= Dave Swift =

British bassist (born 1964)

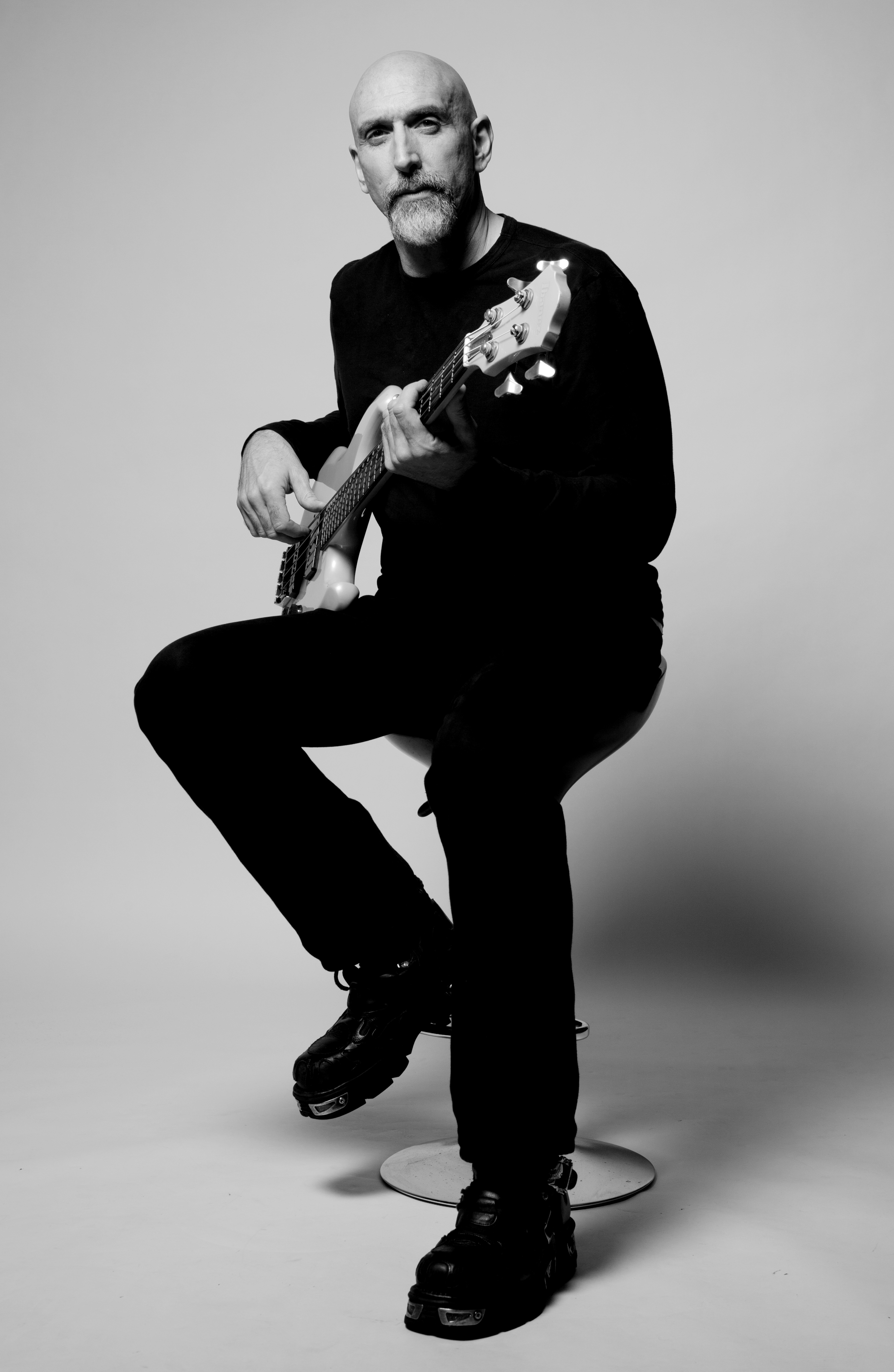

Background information
- Born: 11 January 1964 (age 62); Wolverhampton, England
- Genres: Jazz, Ska, Reggae, Funk, Rock, Pop, Blues, R&B, Soul
- Occupations: Musician, Multi-instrumentalist, music educator
- Instruments: Double bass, tuba, bass guitar, trombone, bass trombone, guitar
- Years active: 1982–present
- Website: daveswiftbass.com
- Known for: Later… with Jools Holland (on BBC2) & The Jools Holland Show (on BBC Radio 2)

Dave Swift (born 11 January 1964) is a British multi-instrumentalist. He is best known for his work on the BBC2 Television programme Later... with Jools Holland as part of Jools Holland's Rhythm and Blues Orchestra.

== Early life and education ==
Born in Wolverhampton, England, Swift's musical experience began in the local school choir and church as a singer. Throughout his childhood Swift was exposed to the acoustic guitar, which both of his brothers played in the trio's childhood home. His musical interest piqued, Swift started off on Euphonium but ultimately, at the age of fourteen, settled on trombone & Tuba. Under the tutelage on two peripatetic brass teachers at his school Alwyn Manley & Phil Johnson. In his hometown, the demand for bassists was on the rise, and Swift volunteered to join local bands. Along his brass playing Swift began teaching himself bass guitar. Swift's trombone teacher saw how quickly he progressed on bass guitar and encouraged him to also pursue the double bass, knowing that Swift would benefit from the ability to play both instruments as a professional musician.

Swift turned professional aged 18. As a highly skilled sight-reader, and being well acclimatised to each of his three instruments, he became a session bassist in and around the Midlands. In 1988 Swift moved to London and quickly became involved in the session and jazz scene.

== Professional career ==
In 1991 Swift heard that Jools Holland, ex-Squeeze keyboardist and TV presenter, was searching for a bassist who played both double bass and bass guitar. With the renowned bassist Pino Palladino then holding the “bass chair” in Holland's band, this was a bold move on the young bassist's part. The advantage from Swift's position was that he also played double bass and was already skilled in sight-reading. Swift auditioned, was hired on the spot, and has been Holland's bassist ever since.

Thanks to his talent and growing popularity, Swift is often invited at shows and camps. Recently, Swift was invited to appear at the annual Warwick Bass Camp in Germany in 2016 as a VIP guest, along with numerous popular bass luminaries from all over the world. The 2016 Warwick Bass Camp was held in Markeneukirchen, Germany, and had a roster of outstanding bassists. Attending professors included Alphonso Johnson, Felix Pastorius, Anthony Wellington and Steve Bailey. Swift was also a guest lecturer at the March 2016 Bass Guitar Show at Earls Court Olympia that filled the room to capacity.

Swift is still an in-demand session musician outside of Holland's band and has also played double bass for American soul singer Gary U.S. Bonds, Ben E. King and on ex-Kinks frontman Ray Davies's album, Other People's Lives.

As one of the leading bassists in the UK, Swift is part of many projects. He had a notable appearance in Thomas Solomon Gray's debut album called New Beginnings which was released in 2015 and featured Ivo Neame (piano) and Mike Outram (guitar).

Swift has played with Alexander Armstrong and his Band, who toured the UK in late 2013. In January and February 2016, they completed another tour.

Swift has made a number of TV appearances throughout the years, including on ITV's This Morning show. He is an active online educator.

Since joining Jools Holland and His Rhythm and Blues Orchestra, Swift has played at many prestigious events, including the North Sea Jazz Festival, Dubai International Jazz Festival, Blue Note Tokyo, Amnesty International, the Montreux Jazz Festival, Glastonbury Festival and the G8 conference for world leaders including Tony Blair and Bill Clinton. Swift has notably played for Her Majesty the Queen at the Millennium Night celebration, Millennium Dome. The orchestra also played a sold-out gig at the Sydney Opera House during their 2008 tour of Australia and New Zealand.

== Radio, film and television ==
Swift was the house bassist for the primetime Saturday night Chris Evans's TV show Don't Forget Your Toothbrush, Name That Tune on Channel 5. Since 1991 he has featured as house bassist on Later… with Jools Holland on BBC2. The band continues to tour both nationally and internationally.

Swift currently performs on The Jools Holland Show, a BBC Radio 2 program. Swift and Holland appeared on the front cover in the June 2016 issue of the British publication Bass Guitar magazine. This feature was Swift's fourth interview in the magazine and his second cover feature.

During his time with Holland, Swift has played on several British movie soundtracks including: Secret Friends (Dennis Potter), MILK (Dawn French), Kevin and Perry Go Large (Harry Enfield, Cathy Burke), and Hunting Venus (Martin Clunes).

Most recently, Swift played bass on the soundtrack to the period drama Me & Orson Welles (starring Zac Efron, Christian McKay and Claire Danes). The period drama, set in 1937, features Swift and the Rhythm & Blues Orchestra making an on-screen appearance as a dance band in the ballroom scene.

The band have both played on and appeared in several TV commercials, including two for Bell's whisky. Swift was also the house bassist on the Johnny Vaughan Tonight series on BBC Three.

== Current projects ==
Since August 2016, Swift has been supporting up and coming UK artist Georgia Crandon, whose music is best categorised as retro jazz and swing. Swift continues to be an in-demand session musician, bass clinician and music educator.

== Discography ==
- The A-Z Geographer's Guide to the Piano (1992)
- Solo Piano (1994)
- Live Performance (1994)
- Sex & Jazz & Rock & Roll (1996)
- Lift The Lid (1997)
- Best Of (1998)
- Sunset Over London (1999)
- Hop The Wag (2000)
- Small World Big Band (2001)
- SWBB Volume Two: More Friends (2003)
- Jack O the Green (SWBB Friends 3) (2003)
- Tom Jones & Jools Holland (2004)
- Beatroute (2005)
- Swinging the Blues, Dancing the Ska (2005)
- Moving Out to the Country (2006)
- Ray Davies: Other People's Lives (2006)
- Best of Friends (2007)
- The Collection (2008)
- The Informer feat. Ruby Turner (2008)
- Me and Orson Welles (2009)
- Rockinghorse (2010)
- Finding the Keys: The Best of Jools Holland (2011)
- The Golden Age of Song (2012)
- Sirens of Song (2014)
- Jools & Ruby feat. Ruby Turner (2015)
- Thomas Solomon Gray: New Beginnings (2015)
