= Chloe Nørgaard =

American-Danish model (born 1990)

- Born: Chloe Melissa Nørgaard; June 25, 1990 (age 35); Los Angeles, California U.S.
- Occupations: Model; DJ Sustainability Director Founder
- Modeling information
- Height: 5 ft 10 in (1.78 m)
- Hair color: Multicolor (dyed); Brown (natural)
- Eye color: Blue
- Agency: One Management (New York); Monster Management (Milan); Premier Model Management (London); IZAIO Management (Berlin); 2pm Model Management (Copenhagen); Model Management (Hamburg); Photogenics LA (Los Angeles); Stockholmsgruppen (Stockholm)
- Website: Wildflowerboom

Chloe Melissa Nørgaard is an American-Danish model. She is well known for her colorful hair. She has a wildflower initiative called Wildflower Boom. She spoke on a panel at the United Nations in September 2017 on The Sustainable Development Goals during Climate Week.

== Early life ==
Chloe Nørgaard was born in Los Angeles in 1990 to a Danish father and American mother. She grew up on Long Island. In first grade, she spray-painted her hair blue.

== Career ==
At age 19, she was noticed and sent to Tokyo. There, she trained in modeling but she also became a DJ.

In 2012, she posed for several magazines including Vice, Nylon, Metal and Harper's Bazaar. She was also featured in a spread for webzine Contributor in which she was dressed by Courtney Love and photographed by Magnus Magnusson.

In February 2013, she walked exclusively for Rodarte during New York Fashion Week. The same year, she advertised Uniqlo, Forever 21 and Philipp Plein.
