= Mark Flanagan (musician) =

British musician

Mark Flanagan (born in Liverpool) is a blues guitarist who plays with Jools Holland's band, The Rhythm and Blues Orchestra. He also fronts the trio "Flanagan", which currently includes himself, Adam Double and George Double. He is also fronting the band The Fields.

He is also a frequent session musician for live television appearances, having worked with Chaka Khan, Paul Weller, Barry White, Eric Clapton and George Harrison.

== Early life ==
He attended St Edwards College, Liverpool.

== Recordings ==
As Flanagan he released Like a Fool in 2000 the UK under the United Notions Productions label, with Alajih Malik and Gary Foote. In 2002, as Flanagan again, he released The Chosen Few in the UK, under Swashbuckle Records. On The Chosen Few Flanagan consisted of himself, Willoughby and Foote. With The Fields, he released Down the Wire in August 2005, The Fields being himself, Jimmy Bergin and Barnes Goulding.
