= Jools Holland =

English musician and television personality (born 1958)

Jools Holland OBE DL
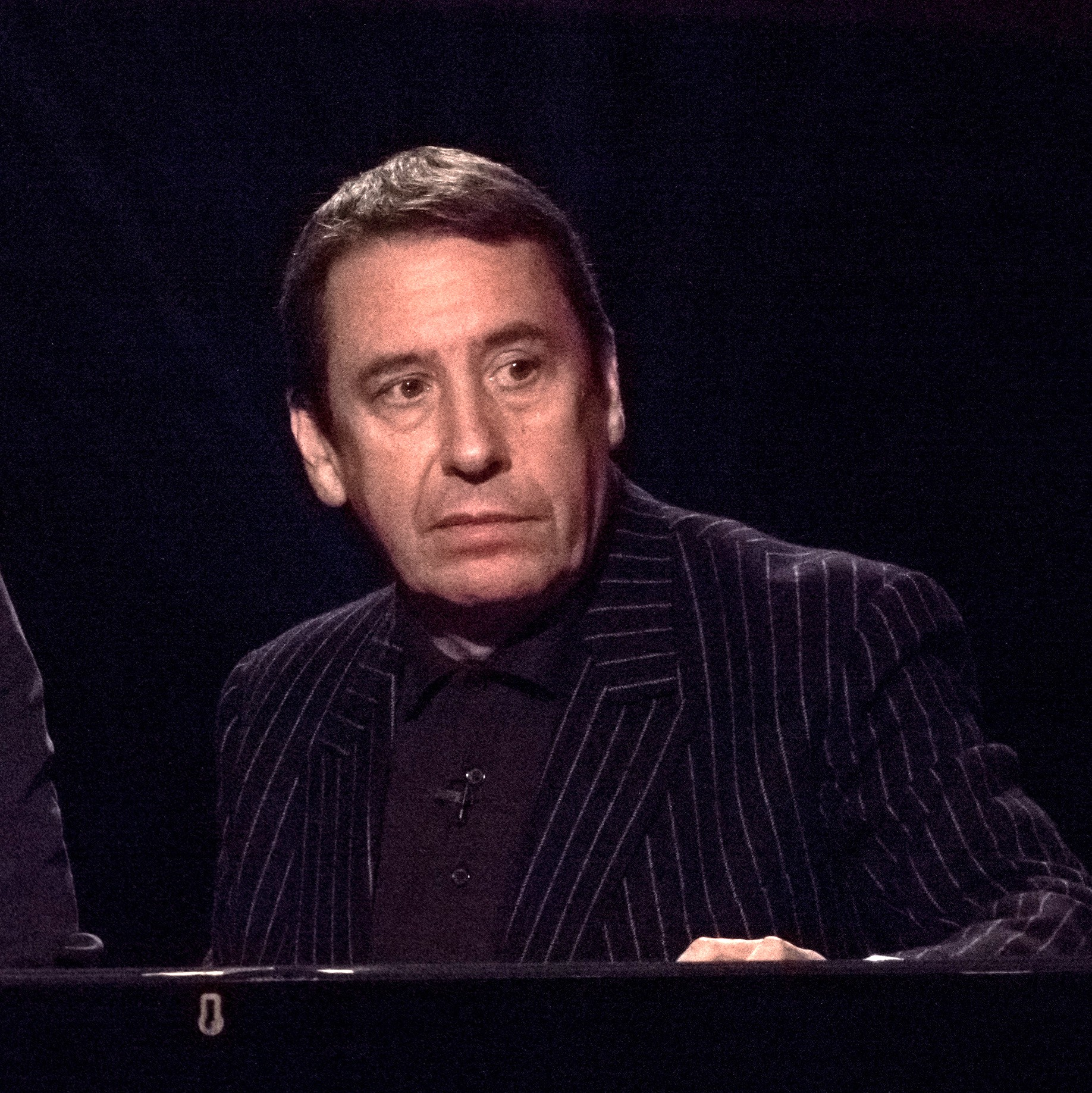
- Holland in 2018
- Born: Julian Miles Holland; 24 January 1958 (age 68); Blackheath, London, England
- Occupations: Musician; composer; television presenter; bandleader
- Years active: 1974–present
- Spouse: Christabel McEwen (m. 2005)
- Children: 3
- Relatives: Christopher Holland (brother)
- Musical career
- Genres: Boogie-woogie; jazz; blues; R&B; new wave; ska
- Instruments: Piano; keyboards; vocals; guitar
- Labels: EastWest, I.R.S.
- Member of: Jools Holland's Rhythm and Blues Orchestra; The Barnestormers
- Formerly of: Squeeze

YouTube information
- Channel: Jools Holland
- Genre: Music
- Subscribers: 51.6 thousand
- Views: 14.3 million
- Last updated: January 2026
- Website: joolsholland.com

Julian Miles Holland (born 24 January 1958) is an English pianist, bandleader, singer, composer and television presenter. He was an original member of the rock band Squeeze, formed in 1974. From 1982 until 1987, he co-presented the Channel 4 music programme The Tube.

In 1987 he created his 19-piece big band Jools Holland and his Rhythm & Blues Orchestra, which has included vocalist Ruby Turner. Since 1992 he has hosted Later... with Jools Holland, a music show aired on BBC2, and in 1994 the BBC2 New Years Eve show Jools' Annual Hootenanny was added. Holland is a published author and appears on television shows besides his own. He regularly hosted the programme Jools Holland on BBC Radio 2.

In 2004 Holland collaborated with the Welsh singer Tom Jones on an album of traditional R&B music. He achieved his first UK number one album in 2024 with Swing Fever, a collaboration with Rod Stewart. He and his band have worked with many other artists, including Marc Almond, Beverley Knight, Jayne County, José Feliciano, Sting, Eric Clapton, Mark Knopfler, George Harrison, David Gilmour, Ringo Starr, Dr. John, Bono, The The, Ruby Turner, and Amy Winehouse.

== Early life and education ==
Holland was born on 24 January 1958 in Blackheath, southeast London. At the age of eight, he could play the piano fluently by ear. By his early teens he was appearing regularly in many of the pubs in southeast London and the East End Docks.

Holland was educated at Shooters Hill Grammar School in southeast London, from which he was expelled for damaging a teacher's Triumph Herald.

== Career ==
Holland began his career as a session musician. His first studio session was with Wayne County & the Electric Chairs in 1976 on their track "Fuck Off".

Holland was a founding member of the rock band Squeeze, formed in London in March 1974, in which he played keyboards until 1980. He played on their first three albums, the eponymous Squeeze, Cool for Cats and Argybargy, before pursuing his solo career.

Holland began issuing solo records in 1978, his first EP being Boogie Woogie '78. He continued his solo career through the early 1980s, releasing an album and several singles between 1981 and 1984. He branched out into TV, co-presenting the Newcastle-based TV music show The Tube with Paula Yates. Holland used the phrase, "be there, or be an ungroovy fucker" in one early evening TV trailer for the show, live across two channels, causing him to be suspended from the show for six weeks. He referred to this in his sitcom The Groovy Fellers with Rowland Rivron.

In 1983 Holland played an extended piano solo on The The's re-recording of "Uncertain Smile" for their album Soul Mining. In 1985, Squeeze (which had continued in Holland's absence through to 1982) unexpectedly regrouped including Holland as their keyboard player. Holland remained in the band until 1990, at which point he again departed to resume his solo career as a musician and a TV host.

In 1987 Holland formed the Jools Holland Big Band, which consisted of himself and Gilson Lavis from Squeeze, plus a number of session musicians. The band grew and was soon renamed as Jools Holland and his Rhythm & Blues Orchestra. In May 2022, it was a 17-piece orchestra and included singers Louise Marshall, Ruby Turner and Holland's daughter Mabel Ray, as well as his younger brother, singer-songwriter and keyboard player, Christopher Holland.

Between 1988 and 1990 Holland performed and co-hosted along with David Sanborn during the two seasons of the music performance programme Sunday Night on NBC late-night television. Since 1992, he has presented the music programme Later... with Jools Holland, plus an annual New Year's Eve Hootenanny on BBC Two.

In 1992 he interviewed the surviving Beatles as part of the Beatles Anthology documentary series.

In 1996 Holland signed a recording contract with Warner Bros. Records, and his records are now marketed through Rhino Records.

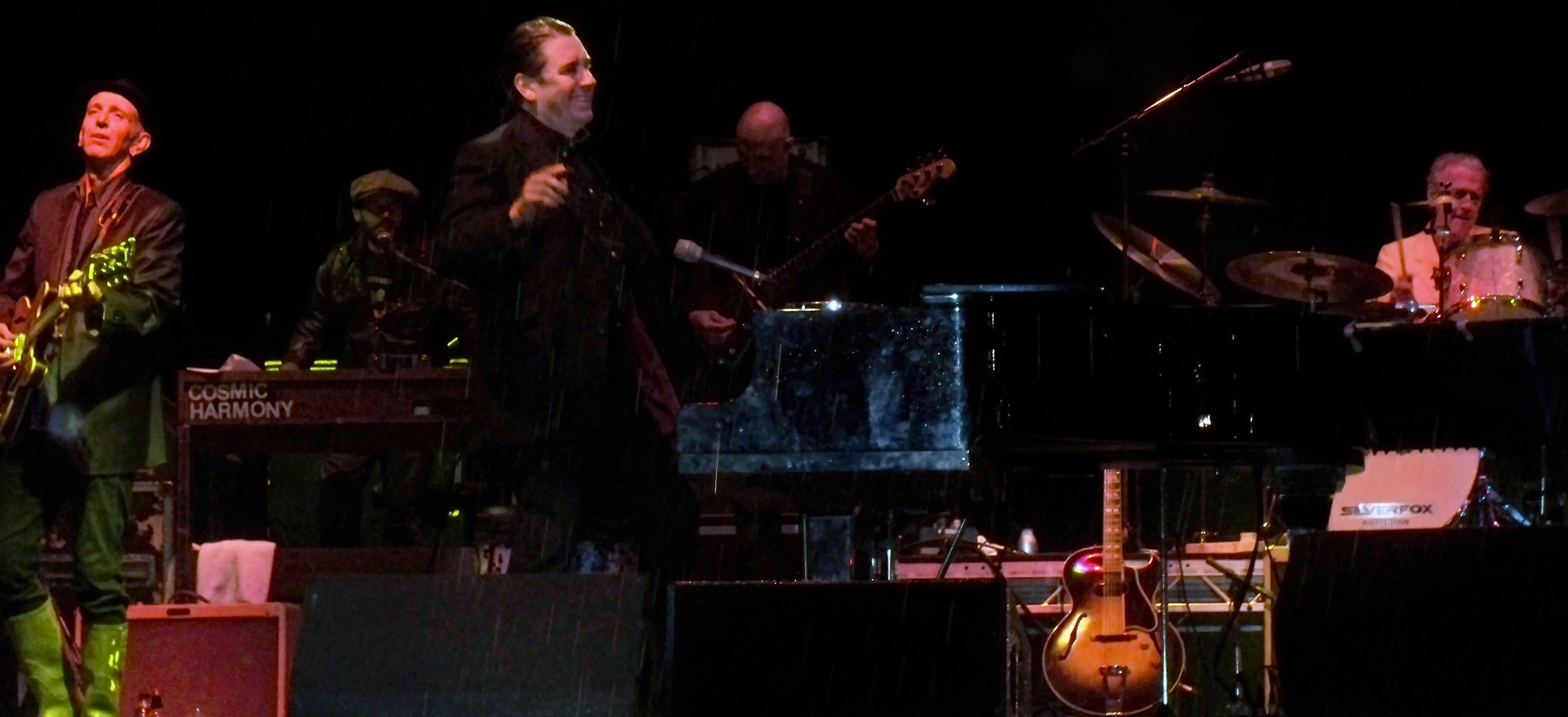
Holland and his R&B Orchestra performing at GuilFest 2012

On 29 November 2002, Holland was in the ensemble of musicians who performed at the Concert for George, which celebrated the music of George Harrison. In January 2005, Holland and his band performed with Eric Clapton as the headline act of the Tsunami Relief Cardiff.

In 2004 he collaborated with the Welsh singer Tom Jones on an album of traditional R&B music.

On BBC Radio 2 Holland regularly hosted the programme Jools Holland, a mix of live and recorded music and general chat, featuring studio guests, along with members of his orchestra. Holland currently hosts the music magazine programme Earlier with Jools Holland on BBC Radio 3 at 12.00 - 13.00 on Saturdays.

In March 2023, Jimmy Barnes announced the formation of supergroup the Barnestormers, featuring Barnes, Holland, Chris Cheney, Slim Jim Phantom, and Kevin Shirley. A self-titled album was released on 26 May 2023.

Holland achieved his first UK number one album in 2024 with Swing Fever, a collaboration with Rod Stewart.

== Personal life ==
As a teenager, Holland lived with his grandparents, which he mentioned anecdotally in a 2020 episode of Rhod Gilbert's Growing Pains.

Holland has a son, George, and daughter, Rose, with his former partner Mary Leahy. On 30 August 2005, Holland married Christabel McEwen at St James' Church, Cooling, his girlfriend of 15 years and daughter of artist Rory McEwen. The couple have a daughter, Mabel, and McEwen has a son, Frederick Lambton, Viscount Lambton, by her former marriage to Ned Lambton, the 7th Earl of Durham.

Holland lives in Westcombe Park, southeast London. He also owns a manor house near the medieval Cooling Castle in Kent.

Holland appeared on the cover of Railway Modeller magazine in January 2019. In the attic of his house, Holland has spent ten years building a 100-foot (30 m) model railway. It is full of miniature buildings and landscapes that stretch from Berlin to London. He started with photographs and paintings from early 1960s London. According to The Daily Telegraph, "In the evenings, he builds some trains and buildings before switching on some music, pouring a glass of wine and switching on the trains to watch them move around the room."

Holland received an OBE in 2003 in the Queen's Birthday Honours list, for services to the British music industry as a television presenter and musician. In September 2006, Holland was appointed a Deputy Lieutenant for Kent. Holland was appointed an honorary fellow of Canterbury Christ Church University at a ceremony held at Canterbury Cathedral on 30 January 2009. On 1 February 2011, he was appointed honorary colonel of 101 (City of London) Engineer Regiment. Holland has been the President of the British Watch & Clock Makers Guild since 2018, and an honorary liveryman of the Worshipful Company of Plumbers since 2019.

In June 2006, Holland performed in Southend for HIV/AIDS charity Mildmay, and in early 2007 he performed at Wells and Rochester Cathedrals to raise money for maintaining cathedral buildings. He is also patron of Drake Music.

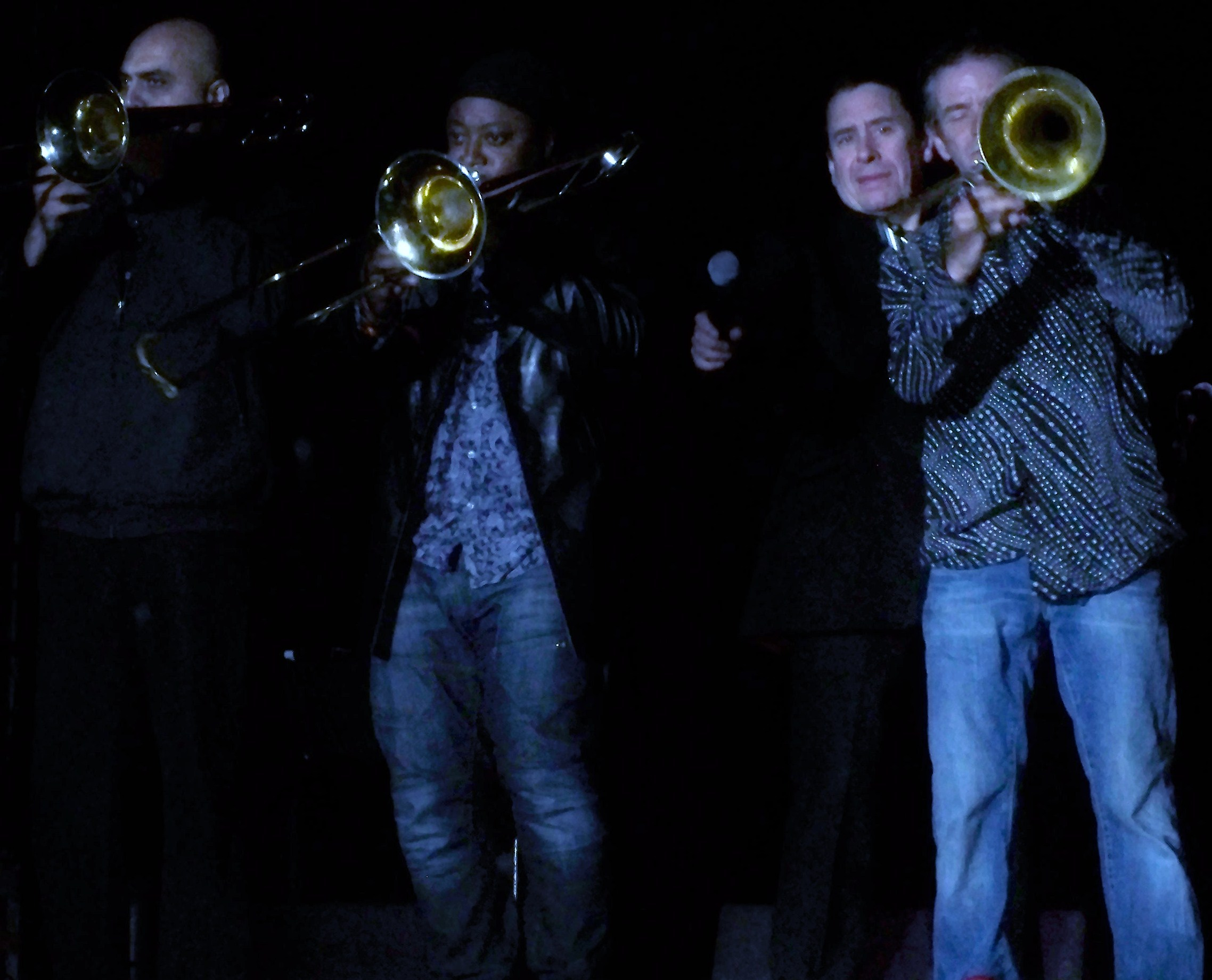
Jools Holland's Rhythm and Blues Orchestra at Guilfest 2012

A fan of the 1960s TV series The Prisoner, in 1987 Holland demonstrated his love of the series and starred in a spoof documentary, The Laughing Prisoner, with Stephen Fry, Terence Alexander and Hugh Laurie. Much of it was shot on location in Portmeirion, the setting for The Prisoner, with archive footage of Patrick McGoohan. It featured musical selections by Siouxsie and the Banshees, Magnum and XTC. Holland performed a number towards the end of the programme. He had his own studio complex, Helicon Mountain, built to his design and inspired by Portmeirion.

Holland was an interviewer for The Beatles Anthology TV project, and appeared in the 1997 film Spiceworld as a musical director.

In 2009 Holland commissioned TV series Bangla Bangers (Chop Shop) to create a replica of the Rover JET1 for personal use.

== Writing ==
Holland's 2007 autobiography, Barefaced Lies and Boogie-Woogie Boasts, was BBC Radio 4's "Book of the Week" in the week beginning 8 October 2007 and was read by Holland.

== Discography ==
=== Charting and certified albums ===
Year	Album	Peak chart positions		Certifications (sales thresholds)
Year	Album	UK	NZ	Certifications (sales thresholds)
1996	Sex & Jazz & Rock & Roll	38	–	
1998	The Best Of	90	–	UK: Silver
2000	Hop the Wag	–	–	UK: Silver
2001	Small World Big Band	8	23	UK: 2× Platinum
2002	SWBB Volume Two: More Friends	17	44	UK: Platinum
2003	Jack o the Green (SWBB Friends 3)	39	–	UK: Silver
2004	Tom Jones & Jools Holland	5	–	UK: Gold
2005	Swinging the Blues, Dancing the Ska	36	–	
2007	Best of Friends	9	–	UK: Silver
2011	Finding the Keys – The Best Of	127	–	
2012	The Golden Age of Song	11	–	UK: Silver
2015	Jools & Ruby	39	–	
2017	As You See Me Now (with José Feliciano)	24	–	
2018	A Lovely Life to Live (with Marc Almond)	61	–	
2024	Swing Fever (with Rod Stewart)	1	–	UK: Silver

=== Releases ===
- 1978 "Boogie Woogie '78" (EP)
- 1981 Jools Holland and His Millionaires
- 1984 Jools Holland Meets Rock 'A' Boogie Billy (US release only)
- 1990 World of His Own
- 1991 The Full Complement
- 1992 "Together Again" (single with Sam Brown)
- 1992 The A–Z Geographer's Guide to the Piano
- 1994 Solo Piano
- 1994 Live Performance
- 1996 Sex & Jazz & Rock & Roll
- 1997 Lift the Lid
- 1998 Best Of
- 1999 Sunset Over London
- 2000 Hop the Wag
- 2001 Small World Big Band
- 2001 Jools Holland's Big Band Rhythm & Blues
- 2002 SWBB Volume Two: More Friends
- 2003 Jack O the Green (SWBB Friends 3)
- 2004 Tom Jones & Jools Holland
- 2005 Beatroute
- 2005 Swinging the Blues, Dancing the Ska
- 2006 Moving Out to the Country
- 2007 Best of Friends
- 2008 The Collection
- 2008 The Informer (with Ruby Turner)
- 2008 "The Informer" (single with Ruby Turner)
- 2009 "I Went By" (single with Louise Marshall)
- 2010 Rockinghorse
- 2011 Finding the Keys: The Best of Jools Holland
- 2012 The Golden Age of Song
- 2014 Sirens of Song (UK No. 25)
- 2015 Jools & Ruby (with Ruby Turner)
- 2016 Piano
- 2017 As You See Me Now (with José Feliciano)
- 2018 A Lovely Life to Live (with Marc Almond)
- 2021 Pianola. Piano & Friends
- 2024 Swing Fever (with Rod Stewart)

=== Guest appearances ===
Year	Album	Artist	Details	Ref.
1977	The Count Bishops	The Count Bishops	Piano	
1977	The Electric Chairs	Wayne County & the Electric Chairs	Keyboards	
1978	The Image Has Cracked	Alternative TV	Piano on "Viva La Rock 'n' Roll", Moog synthesizer on "Alternatives"	
1979	Dilemma	Streetband	Keyboards	
1979	Thriller	Eddie and the Hot Rods	Keyboards	
1983	Soul Mining	The The	Piano on "Uncertain Smile"	
1985	Black and White	Terraplane	Organ	
1986	Deep in the Heart of Nowhere	Bob Geldof	Keyboards	
1988	Angst	Chrome Molly	Keyboards	
1988	The Raw & the Cooked	Fine Young Cannibals	Piano on "Good Thing"	
1988	Wolf	Hugh Cornwell	Piano on"Cherry Rare", organ on "Dreaming Again"	
1992	Mirmama	Eddi Reader	Piano, Hammond organ	
1994	Jewel	Marcella Detroit	Piano on "Detroit", Hammond organ on "James Brown"	
1996	Guilty	Ruby Turner	Piano	
1996	Homage	The Blues Band	Piano, organ	
1996	A Night in London	Mark Knopfler	Piano	
1997	Deuces Wild	B. B. King	Piano	
1997	Heavy Soul	Paul Weller	Wurlitzer on "Golden Sands"	
1998	Anutha Zone	Dr. John	Hammond organ	
1999	Straight Up	Leo Green	Hammond organ	
2000	ReBoot	Sam Brown	Piano on "In Light of All That's Gone Before"	
2002	Brainwashed	George Harrison	Piano on "Between the Devil and the Deep; Blue Sea"	
2003	Frank	Amy Winehouse	Deluxe edition Piano on "Teach Me Tonight" (live)	
2004	Roll the Dice	Big Town Playboys	Piano	
2004	Thank You Brother Ray	The Blues Band	Keyboards	
2005	A Hyperactive Workout for the Flying Squad	Ocean Colour Scene	Piano and Hammond organ on "Waving Not Drowning"	
2006	On an Island	David Gilmour	Piano on "The Blue"	
2007	Stardom Road	Marc Almond	Piano on "Backstage (I'm Lonely)"	
2011	Hold On Tight	Solomon Burke and De Dijk	Piano on "What a Woman"	
2015	Making Life Rhyme	Lulu	Piano	
2015	Rattle That Lock	David Gilmour	Piano on "The Girl in the Yellow Dress"	
2015	Suddenly I Like It	Paul Jones	Piano, Hammond organ	
2016	Soulsville	Beverley Knight	Featured on "Hound Dog"	
2017	Daylight	The Selecter	Piano on "Daylight"	
2017	Life Love Flesh Blood	Imelda May	Piano on "When It's My Time"	
2020	Gospel	Mica Paris	Piano on "Take My Hand, Precious Lord"	
2020	Royal Tea	Joe Bonamassa	Co-composer, piano on "Lonely Boy"	

=== Studio albums with Squeeze ===
- Squeeze (1978)
- Cool for Cats (1979)
- Argybargy (1980)
- Cosi Fan Tutti Frutti (1985)
- Babylon and On (1987)
- Frank (1989)

=== Studio albums with The Barnestormers ===
- The Barnestormers (2023)

== Film and television ==
- 1981 Otway & Barrett Live
- 1981 Urgh! A Music War
- 1982 Police: Around the World
- 1982–1987 The Tube (Host for 121 editions)
- 1983 Rebellious Jukebox: Compere
- 1984 The Young Ones: punk (episode entitled "Cash")
- 1985 Walking to New Orleans (Jools Holland in New Orleans)
- 1987 Eat the Rich: Sun Reporter
- 1987 Filthy Rich & Catflap: Strip Show Pianist (Episode No. 1.3)
- 1987 The Laughing Prisoner: No. 7
- 1987 French and Saunders (Episode 1.5)
- 1987 Mister Corbett's Ghost as Defrocked Priest
- 1988 Sunday Night: Host (unknown episodes)
- 1989–1990 Juke Box Jury: Host (all episodes)
- 1989 The Groovy Fellers Himself, 6 episodes
- 1990–1992 Jools Holland's Happening (Noel Gay Productions 37 episodes (BSB 1990–1991); 12 episodes (Channel 4, 1991–1992). Entire series believed lost.
- 1991 Mr Roadrunner (Jools Holland in Memphis)
- 1994 There's No Business...: Pianist (uncredited)
- 1994–1995 Don't Forget Your Toothbrush
- 1995 The Beatles Anthology
- 1997 Spice World: Musical Director
- 1997 Name That Tune: Host and Pianist
- 1998 Beat Route: Round the World with Jools Holland: Host and Pianist
- 2001 Astley's Way: Tribute to composer Edwin Astley
- 2003 Jools' History of the Piano: Presenter
- 2007 Fairport@Forty: Interview
- 2007 Top Gear: Star in a reasonably priced car.
- 2009 Chop Shop Rover Concept: The Jet 1 Car : Customer
- 2012 Jools Holland – London Calling: Presenter
- 2014 The Life of Rock with Brian Pern as himself
- 2023 Little Trains & Big Names with Pete Waterman as himself

=== Current television programmes ===
- 1992–present Later... with Jools Holland
- 1993–present Hootenanny
- 2020–present Celebrity Gogglebox with Vic Reeves

== Books ==
- "Rolling Stones": A Life on the Road (with Dora Loewenstein), Viking/Allen Lane (1998) (ISBN 0-670-88051-5)
- Beat Route: Journeys Through Six Counties, Weidenfeld & Nicolson (1998) (ISBN 0-575-06700-4)
- Ray Charles: Man and Music, (with Michael Lydon), Payback Press (1999) (ISBN 0-86241-929-8)
- Hand That Changed Its Mind, International Music Publications (2007) (ISBN 1-84328-645-9)
- Barefaced Lies and Boogie-woogie Boasts, Penguin Books (2007) (ISBN 9780718149154)
