= Man discography =

A discography of the Welsh rock band Man.

== Contemporary albums ==
This includes studio albums and those live albums that were released contemporaneously. For live albums that were issued much later, see Archive albums below. The 2007/2008 re-issues were remastered, and included bonus tracks and/or bonus CDs.

=== Studio albums ===
Year	Title	UK Chart Peak	Label, Cat.No.	Musicians
1969	Revelation		Pye	Micky Jones, Deke Leonard, Clive John, Ray Williams, Jeff Jones
1969	2 Ozs of Plastic with a Hole in the Middle		Dawn	Jones, Leonard, John, R. Williams, Jones
1971	Man		Liberty	Jones, Leonard, John, Martin Ace, Terry Williams
1971	Do You Like It Here Now, Are You Settling In?		United Artists	Jones, Leonard, John, M. Ace, T. Williams
1972	Be Good to Yourself at Least Once a Day		United Artists	Jones, John, T. Williams, Phil Ryan, Will Youatt
1973	Back into the Future [disc 1]	23	United Artists	Jones, T. Williams, Ryan, Youatt, Tweke Lewis
1974	Rhinos, Winos and Lunatics	24	United Artists	Jones, Leonard, T. Williams, Malcolm Morley, Ken Whaley
1974	Slow Motion		United Artists	Jones, Leonard, T. Williams, Whaley
1976	The Welsh Connection	40	MCA	Jones, Leonard, T. Williams, Ryan, John McKenzie
1992	The Twang Dynasty		Road Goes on Forever	Jones, Leonard, M. Ace, John Weathers
1995	Call Down the Moon		Hypertension HYCD 200 154	Jones, Leonard, M. Ace, Weathers
2000	Endangered Species		Evangeline GEL 4001	Jones, Leonard, M. Ace, Ryan, Bob Richards
2002	Undrugged		Point PNTVP 121CD	Jones, Leonard, M. Ace, T. Williams, Richards, Gareth Thorrington
2006	Diamonds and Coal		Point PNTVP 134 CD	M. Ace, Richards, Thorrington, Josh Ace, George Jones
2009	Kingdom of Noise		Point PNTVP 135 CD	M. Ace, J. Ace, Ryan, James Beck, Rene Robrahn
2015	Reanimated Memories		Cherry Red EANTCD1046	M. Ace, J. Ace, Ryan, Beck, Robrahn
2019	Anachronism Tango		Point PNTGZ109 CD	M. Ace, J. Ace, Beck, Robrahn

=== Live albums ===
Year	Title	UK Chart Peak	Label, Cat.No.	Musicians
1972	Greasy Truckers Party [various artists]		United Artists UDX 203/4	Jones, Leonard, M. Ace, T. Williams
1972	Live at the Padget Rooms, Penarth		United Artists USP1000	Jones, Leonard, M. Ace, T. Williams
1973	Christmas at the Patti [various artists]		United Artists	Jones, T. Williams, Ryan, Youatt, John with Dave Edmunds, Stan Pfeiffer
1973	Back into the Future [disc 2]	23	United Artists	Jones, T. Williams, Ryan, Youatt, Lewis
1975	Maximum Darkness	25	United Artists	Jones, Leonard, M. Ace, T. Williams, John Cipollina
1977	All's Well That Ends Well		MCA MCF2815	Jones, Leonard, T. Williams, Ryan, McKenzie
1984	Friday 13th			Jones, Leonard, M. Ace, Weathers
1998	1998 at the Star Club		LC5768/LD5768	Jones, Leonard, M. Ace, Ryan, Richards
2002	Down Town Live		Altrichter Music AM 310559	Jones, Leonard, M. Ace, Richards

== Archive albums ==
These Man albums were compiled and released retrospectively from previously unissued archive tapes.
Some were issued as bootlegs, before being "ripped off" by the band and issued officially.

- Greasy Truckers Party (Recorded 1972) CD (1997) Point PNTVP104CD

Micky Jones, Deke Leonard, Martin Ace, Terry Williams (the 2 Man tracks from the various-artists Greasy Truckers Party)

- To Live For To Die (Recorded 1970) CD issued as The Honest One (1992) CD (1997) Point PNTVP108CD

Micky Jones, Deke Leonard, Martin Ace, Terry Williams, Clive John

- Live at the Rainbow 1972 CD (1998) Point EAMCD060

Micky Jones, Clive John, Will Youatt, Terry Williams, Phil Ryan

- The 1999 Party Tour (Recorded 1974) CD (1998) Point EAMCD069

Micky Jones, Deke Leonard, Malcolm Morley, Ken Whaley, Terry Williams (Morley is credited in the booklet, but not on the back cover)

- Live in London 1975 CD (1998) Eagle Records EAMCD061

Micky Jones, Deke Leonard, Ken Whaley, Terry Williams

- Live at Reading '83 (Recorded 1983) CD (1993) Raw Fruit FRSCD 010

Micky Jones, Deke Leonard, Martin Ace, John Weathers

- The Official Bootleg (Recorded 1994) CD (June 2001) Point PNTVP109CD

Micky Jones, Deke Leonard, Martin Ace, John Weathers

- Live at Crosskeys Institute 25th May 1984: Official Bootleg Series, Vol 1 CD - Effigy Music

Micky Jones, Deke Leonard, Martin Ace, John Weathers

- Live at the Keystone Berkeley, 9th August 1976: Official Bootleg Series, Vol 2 Double CD - Effigy Music

Micky Jones, Deke Leonard, John McKenzie, Terry Williams, Phil Ryan + John Cippolina on 4 tracks

- Live at Hebden Bridge Trades Club 11th December 2004: Official Bootleg Series, Vol 3 CD - Effigy Music

Micky Jones, George Jones, Martin Ace, Bob Richards, Gareth Thorrington

== Compilation albums ==
- Golden Hour of Man Golden Hour Records LP (1973)

Album on the Pye Golden Hour series: tracks from Revelation and 2 Ozs of Plastic with a Hole in the Middle

- Green Fly Cherry Red Records LP (1986) D Late 1

Double LP with 11 Tracks from Be Good to Yourself..., Back into the Future, Rhinos, Winos and Lunatics, Slow Motion, and Maximum Darkness

- Perfect Timing – The U.A. Years EMI LP (1991) 7 96542 1 CD (1991) CDP 7 96542 2 / CDEMS 1403

12 Tracks (11 studio & 1 live) from Man, Do You Like It Here Now..., Be Good to Yourself..., Back into the Future, Rhinos, Winos and Lunatics, Slow Motion, and Maximum Darkness

- The Dawn of Man CD (1997) Recall SMD CD 124

All of Revelation and 2 Ozs of Plastic with a Hole in the Middle plus the bonus singles

- The Definitive Collection CD (1998) Castle CCSCD 832

All of Revelation and 2 Ozs of Plastic with a Hole in the Middle plus the Bystanders singles

- 3 Decades of Man CD (2000) Point EAMCD099

From:- Do You Like It …? 1999 Party, Live in London, Welsh Connection, All’s Well…, Friday 13th, Twang Dynasty, and Live Official Bootleg

- Rare Man CD (June 2001) Point PNTVP120CD

Singles, cassette-only tracks, outtakes etc.

- Man Alive CD (2003) Snapper Music SMDCD 478

From:- Greasy Truckers, Rainbow 1972, 1999 Party, BBC In Concert, All’s Well…, Friday 13th, and Glastonbury 1994

- And in the Beginning (The Complete Early Man 1968-69) Double CD (December 2004) Castle Music CCDCD 921

All of Revelation and 2 Ozs of Plastic with a Hole in the Middle, the Pye singles, and 2 unreleased tracks from the 2 Ozs... session

- Keep on Crinting (The Liberty/UA Years Anthology 1971–1975) Double CD (2006) EMI 94636066028

Album selections from Man through Slow Motion, plus live version of "The Storm" and the single "I'm Dreaming"

- Sixty Minutes With Man CD (April 2007) Voiceprint VP6001CD

From:- Man, Do You Like It...?, Twang Dynasty, Call Down The Moon, "Diamonds & Coal & Bananas" single

== Tribute album ==
- Man We're Glad We Know You (2000) Pete Gifford Records PGRSCD
