= Hux Records =

British record label

- Parent company: Digiview Entertainment
- Founded: 1998
- Founder: Warner Music Group
- Distributor: Universal Music Group (United States)
- Genre: Various
- Country of origin: United Kingdom
- Location: London, England
- Official website: huxrecords.com

Hux Records is a British record label based in England, which was launched in 1998. They specialise in releasing old material, especially in unreleased BBC recordings such as John Peel Sessions and BBC Radio 1 concerts. Hux has gained a reputation as an excellent independent record label, offering an eclectic selection of classic archive recordings. Hux has also re-released recordings by such artists as Malcolm Morley's Sam Apple Pie and Help Yourself; and Man's debut album, which was recorded in 1976 but not released latterly (the master tapes were lost and only discovered recently).

== Artists ==
- Atomic Rooster
- Auto Da Fé
- Back Door
- Barefoot Jerry
- Be-Bop Deluxe
- Billie Jo Spears
- Blodwyn Pig
- Bridget St John
- Brinsley Schwarz
- Caravan
- Clint Black
- Connie Smith
- Ducks Deluxe
- Duffy Power
- Dr. Strangely Strange
- Dreamtime
- Eggs over Easy
- Elton Dean
- Elton Dean and Sophia Domancich
- Equip Out (Pip Pyle's band)
- Ernie Graham
- Family
- Focus
- Formerly Fat Harry
- Gay and Terry Woods
- Gene Vincent
- Gene Watson
- Gentle Giant
- Graham Parker
- Grease Band
- Grimms
- Gryphon
- Gypsy
- Harold McNair
- Help Yourself
- Heron
- Ian Gomm
- Iceberg (Deke Leonard's band)
- Isotope
- Jan Akkerman
- John Martyn
- John Sebastian
- Kevin Ayers
- Kokomo
- Lew Lewis
- Malcolm Morley
- Matching Mole
- McGuinness Flint
- Mick Softley
- Mickey Jupp
- Neil Innes
- Nils Lofgren
- Nucleus
- Pentangle
- Peter Ivers
- Psychic Warrior
- Rick Wakeman
- Robyn Hitchcock
- Roger Morris
- Skid Row
- Soft Machine
- Soft Mountain (Elton Dean and Hugh Hopper band)
- Stoney Edwards
- Terry Edwards
- The Blues Band
- The Edgar Broughton Band
- The Higsons
- The Incredible String Band
- The Only Ones
- The Rumour
- The Tubes
- Tír na nÓg
- Tom T. Hall
- Violent Femmes
- Wizz Jones
- Wreckless Eric
