= Bob Richards (musician) =

Bob Richards is a Welsh-born drummer, best known for his tenures in the bands Man and Asia. In the early 1990s, Richards played in Adrian Smith's solo band during his time out of Iron Maiden. Richards later had Smith record a guitar solo on his current cover band's first album. Richards is endorsed by Paiste cymbals and Agner drum sticks from his time with Smith.

From 1997 to 2008, he played with Man and appeared on five albums: Endangered Species, Down Town Live, Undrugged, Diamonds and Coal and Kingdom of Noise. In 2014, Richards worked with AC/DC when he filled in for the long-term drummer Phil Rudd during his trial and appeared in several music videos. Richards currently tours and records with the Welsh rock band, Buck & Evans. The guitarist Chris Buck, from Caerphilly, has collaborated with Slash, joining him on stage as well as being picked up by former Guns N' Roses manager Alan Niven.

Richards also plays in "Son of Man", with the guitarist George Jones (former Man member and son of Micky Jones), Richie Galloni (vocals), Marco James (keyboards) and Ray Jones (bass guitar) from the Welsh band Sassafras and Glenn Quinn (guitar) from Tigertailz. Richards has also worked with Dave Edmunds, Andy Fairweather Low, Paul Chapman (UFO), Mikel Japp (KISS), Tony Mills (TNT), Carl Sentence (Krokus, Geezer Butler, Don Airey) and played on the title track of the MGM film, Agent Cody Banks 2: Destination London..

Additionally Richards plays with Classic Rock band Atack with Keith Atack (Child), Lee Small (Sweet), Chris Childs (Thunder) and Nick Foley (Handsome Beasts).
