= Maximum Darkness =

Live album by Man
- Released: July 1975
- Recorded: 26 May 1975
- Venue: The Roundhouse
- Studio: The Manor Mobile
- Length: 50:15
- Label: United Artists
- Producer: Man

Man chronology
Slow Motion (1974)	Maximum Darkness (1975)	The Welsh Connection (1976)

Professional ratings
Review scores
Source	Rating
AllMusic	3/5 stars

Maximum Darkness is the tenth album by the Welsh rock band Man and was released on the United Artists Records label July 1975. It was the second live album released by the band, excluding contributions to two "various artists" live albums, and featured John Cipollina as special guest. Rumours that Micky Jones had to over-dub Cipollina’s guitar, as it was out of tune, before the album could be released, are greatly exaggerated. Only one track, "Bananas", had to have his playing removed/replaced, per Deke Leonard: "Everything ... which sounds like Cipollina is Cipollina." The album spent two weeks in the UK album chart, peaking at No 25. It was the band's last release on United Artists, before moving to MCA Records.

== Track listing ==
Side one
No.	Title	Writer(s)	Length
1.	"7171-551"	Deke Leonard	11:05
2.	"Codine"	Buffy St. Marie	7:40
3.	"Babe I'm Gonna Leave You"	Darling, Bennett, Anne Bredon	6:30

Side two
No.	Title	Writer(s)	Length
1.	"Many Are Called But Few Get Up"	Martin Ace, Clive John, Micky Jones, Deke Leonard, Terry Williams	13:40
2.	"Bananas"	Micky Jones, Phil Ryan, Terry Williams, Clive John	11:20

Bonus tracks on Esoteric Recordings ECLEC 2061 CD-release (2008)
No.	Title	Writer(s)	Length
6.	"C'Mon"	Micky Jones, Phil Ryan, Terry Williams, Clive John	23:56
7.	"Romain"	Martin Ace, Clive John, Michael Jones, Deke Leonard, Terry Williams	5:00

Both tracks recorded live at The Keystone, Berkeley, California in April 1975.

== Personnel ==
- Micky Jones – guitar, vocals
- Deke Leonard – guitar, vocals
- Martin Ace – bass, guitar, vocals
- Terry Williams – drums, vocals

=== Guest ===
- John Cipollina – guitar

=== Credits ===
- Rick Griffin – lettering, logo design
- Vic Maile – recording & mixing
- Keith Morris – front cover photograph, inside photos
- Edmund Shea – inside photos
- Rick Lefrak – stage lighting
