= Rhinos, Winos and Lunatics =

Studio album by Man
- Released: May 1974
- Recorded: February 1974
- Studio: Morgan Studios, Willesden; Trident Studios, Wardour Street
- Length: 37:48
- Label: United Artists
- Producer: Roy Thomas Baker

Man chronology
Back into the Future (1973)	Rhinos, Winos and Lunatics (1974)	Slow Motion (1974)

Professional ratings
Review scores
Source	Rating
AllMusic	4.5/5.0 stars
Christgau's Record Guide	B+

Rhinos, Winos and Lunatics (stylized on the cover as man: rhinos, winos + lunatics) is the eighth album by the Welsh rock band Man and was released May 1974 on the United Artists Records label. It was produced by Roy Thomas Baker, noted for his work with Queen, and spent 4 weeks in the UK album chart, peaking at No 24. The album marked the return of Deke Leonard and the introduction of two members from Help Yourself.

== Track listing ==
All tracks composed by Jones, Leonard, Morley, Whaley and Williams except where noted.

Side one
No.	Title	Writer(s)	Length
1.	"Taking the Easy Way Out Again"		4:22
2.	"The Thunder and Lightning Kid"		5:18
3.	"California Silks and Satins"	Leonard, Morley	4:38
4.	"Four Day Louise"		6:02

Side two
No.	Title	Length
1.	"Intro"	0:44
2.	"Kerosene"	6:29
3.	"Scotch Corner"	9:03
4.	"Exit"	1:12

== Personnel ==
- Micky Jones – guitar, vocals
- Deke Leonard – guitar, vocals
- Malcolm Morley – guitar, keyboards, vocals
- Ken Whaley – bass
- Terry Williams – drums, vocals

=== Credits ===
- Producer – Roy Thomas Baker
- Engineers – Peter Kelsey, Martin Levan
- Liner Notes – Michael Heatley
- Art Direction, Design – Pierre Tubbs
- Front and back cover photography – Keith Morris
- Inside photography – David Redfern International

== Release history ==
Original LP released on United Artists in May 1974 - Catalogue Nos UAG 29631 (UK) and LA 247G (US)
Released as CD on Beat Goes On Records (BGO Records) in 1993 - Catalogue Nos BGOCD 208 (UK)
Remixed and re-issued with bonus tracks on Esoteric Recordings in 2007 - Catalogue No ECLEC 2020

Bonus track on Esoteric re-issue (2007):
No.	Title	Length
9.	"Taking The Easy Way Out Again" (Single Version)	3:19

Bonus CD Recorded Live At The Whiskey A Go Go:
No.	Title	Length
1.	"American Mother" (Live)	14:21
2.	"7171 551" (Live)	12:25
3.	"A Hard Way To Live" (Live)	3:40
4.	"Romain" (Live)	19:04
5.	"Bananas" (Live)	19:39
