= The Twang Dynasty =

Studio album by Man
- Released: 14 November 1992
- Recorded: Scarf Studios, London
- Genre: Pub rock; prog
- Length: 60:16
- Label: Voiceprint
- Producer: Peter Ker

Man chronology
Friday 13th (1984)	The Twang Dynasty (1992)	Call Down The Moon (1995)

Professional ratings
Review scores
Source	Rating
AllMusic	2.5/5 stars

The Twang Dynasty is the tenth studio album by the Welsh rock band Man, but the first to be released after their reformation in 1983.

Man had recorded an album of new material in Germany, the year they reformed, but fell out with the producer, who was also the album's promoter, so the album was never issued. The Twang Dynasty was recorded over two weeks in August and two weeks in September 1992, and released on 14 November 1992, sixteen years after their previous studio album. The album includes the track "Fast and Dangerous" which was used on trailers for Paul Whitehouse’s Fast Show, although the band were not paid for this.

It was the first studio album by Man to feature drummer John "Pugwash" Weathers, formerly of Gentle Giant, although he had appeared on the live album Friday 13th released in 1984.

In 2011 Deke Leonard reused the name for his book The Twang Dynasty (From Memphis to Merthyr; guitarists that rocked the world) (Northdown Publishing).

== Track listing ==
1. "A Feather on the Scales of Justice" (Man) – 7:28
2. "Mad on Her" (Man) – 6:59
3. "Jumpin' Like a Kangaroo" (Ace) – 4:46
4. "The Chimes at Midnight" (Man) – 5:25
5. "The Price (Ellis, Man) – 5:57
6. "Circumstances" (Leonard, Simmons) – 4:45
7. "Women" (Man) – 4:29
8. "The Chinese Cut" (Man) – 3:54
9. "Out of the Darkness" (Man) – 5:36
10. "Fast and Dangerous" (Man) – 5:33
11. "The Wings of Mercury" (Man) – 5:24

== Personnel ==
- Micky Jones – guitar and vocals
- Deke Leonard – guitar and vocals
- Martin Ace – bass and vocals
- John Weathers – drums and vocals

=== Credits ===
- Julie Sheldon – photography
- Phil Smee – cover design
