= Slow Motion (Man album) =

Studio album by Man
- Released: October 1974
- Recorded: July and September 1974
- Studio: Rockfield Studios near Monmouth
- Length: 39:33
- Label: United Artists
- Producer: Man with Anton Matthews

Man chronology
| Rhinos, Winos and Lunatics (1974) | Slow Motion (1974) | Maximum Darkness (1975) |

Professional ratings
Review scores
| Source | Rating |
|---|---|
| AllMusic | 4/5 stars |
| Christgau's Record Guide | B+ |
| DPRP | (8/10) |

Slow Motion is the ninth album by the Welsh rock band Man and was released on the United Artists Records label. It was the only album recorded by this line-up, Malcolm Morley (guitar, keyboards, vocals) having left the day before recording was due to start. He was not replaced, so the album was recorded by the remaining four members. Unlike the previous and subsequent albums (Rhinos, Winos and Lunatics and The Welsh Connection) Slow Motion failed to make the UK top 40 album chart.

The album title was chosen to challenge sleeve designer Rick Griffin, who painted Alfred E. Neuman shaking a fish, but Mad magazine objected, so the final image concentrated on the fish. The band name "Man" was also written in a font resembling the Mad logo.

== Track listing ==
All songs composed by Micky Jones, Deke Leonard, Ken Whaley and Terry Williams.

Side one
| No. | Title | Length |
|---|---|---|
| 1. | "Hard Way to Die" | 5:21 |
| 2. | "Grasshopper" | 5:13 |
| 3. | "Rock and Roll You Out" | 3:52 |
| 4. | "You Don't Like Us" | 4:33 |

Side two
| No. | Title | Length |
|---|---|---|
| 1. | "Bedtime Bone" | 5:54 |
| 2. | "One More Chance" | 4:27 |
| 3. | "Rainbow Eyes" | 6:07 |
| 4. | "Day and Night" | 4:06 |

== Release history ==
Original LP released on United Artists in 1974 - Catalogue Nos UAG 29675 (UK) and LA 345G (US)
Released as CD on Beat Goes On Records (BGO Records) in 1993 - Catalogue Nos BGOCD 209 (UK) and BGT 209 (US)
Remixed and re-issued with bonus tracks on Esoteric Recordings in 2008 - Catalogue No ECLEC 2062

Bonus tracks on Esoteric re-issue (2008):
| No. | Title | Length |
|---|---|---|
| 9. | "Rock and Roll You Out" (1st mix) |
| 10. | "Hard Way to Live" (Live) |
| 11. | "Hard Way to Die" (Live at the Keystone, Berkeley April 1975) |
| 12. | "Someone Is Calling" (Live at the Keystone, Berkeley April 1975) |
| 13. | "Many Are Called But Few Get Up" (Live at the Keystone, Berkeley April 1975) |
| 14. | "Hard Way to Live" (Live at the Keystone, Berkeley April 1975) |

For information about releases in other countries, singles, cassettes, 8 track cartridges etc., see The Manband Archive

== Personnel ==
Man

- Micky Jones – guitar, vocals
- Deke Leonard – guitar, keyboards, vocals
- Ken Whaley – bass
- Terry Williams – drums, vocals

Additional musicians

- Mountain Fjord Orchestra – strings on "Grasshopper"
- Chris Mercer – saxophone on "Rock and Roll You Out"
- Stuart Gordon – strings on "Rainbow Eyes"
- James Matthews – harmonica, jaw's harp, vocals
- Anton Matthews – vocals
- David Hamilton-Smith – vocals

Production

- Producer – Man and Anton Matthews
- Production & Special Assistance – David Charles
- Mixing – David Hamilton-Smith, David Charles, Robin Black, Anton Matthews
- Design – Rick Griffin
- Liner Notes – Michael Heatley
