= Christmas at the Patti =

Live album by Various Artists
- Released: July 1973
- Recorded: Patti Pavilion, Swansea; 19 December 1972
- Genre: Rock
- Length: 55:03
- Label: United Artists – UDX/205/6
- Producer: Sheer Luck

Man chronology
Be Good to Yourself at Least Once a Day (1972)	Christmas at the Patti (1973)	Back into the Future (1973)

Christmas at the Patti is a live album, recorded at Man's Christmas party, held at the Patti Pavilion, Swansea, on 19 December 1972. The album features Man and Help Yourself with guests Deke Leonard, Dave Edmunds and B J Cole, together with appearances by Ducks Deluxe, The Jets, The Flying Aces and Plum Crazy.

The concert started at 6.00 PM and was closed by the police at midnight, so Man's set was truncated and, despite being the hosts, they have only 11'30" on the album, compared to Help Yourself's 25'43". The six bands appearing on the album were all linked in some way, and several performers appeared in more than one band, some of which were old bands, reformed just for the night. Those appearing on the album were all "conveniently" UA labelmates.

Originally released as a limited edition double 10" album, with a recommended retail price of £1.43, this topped the budget album chart. It was subsequently released on CD, and, unusually, re-released on 10" vinyl in Italy in 2001

== Artists ==
=== The Flying Aces ===
Martin and George Ace, a husband and wife duo, backed by members of Help Yourself. Martin Ace had previously played in Dream and Man with Deke Leonard, who had been playing with Help Yourself since he had been fired by Man earlier in the year. The song had been written earlier that day and was only performed on this one night. Although opening the album, they were the penultimate act on the night.

- Martin Ace – guitar and vocals
- George Ace – bass and vocals
- Dave Charles – drums
- Deke Leonard – guitar
- Malcolm Morley – guitar

=== Ducks Deluxe ===
The first recording of pub rock band Ducks Deluxe ever released. The band had been formed earlier in the year by former Help Yourself roadie Sean Tyla, and bassist Ken Whaley. Whaley had already left by the time of this recording and would rejoin Help Yourself about 6 weeks later.

- Sean Tyla – guitar and vocals
- Martin Belmont – guitar and vocals
- Tim Roper – drums
- Nick Garvey – bass

=== The Jets ===
There have been numerous bands called The Jets. This version had been a Swansea band 1964-65, and was later known as "The Smokeless Zone" who had played the Top Ten Club in Hamburg where Tony Sheridan played with them. Having had minimal rehearsal time, they chose two standards.

- Tony "Plum" Hollis – vocals
- Deke Leonard – guitar
- Martin Ace – bass
- Terry Williams – drums

=== Plum Crazy with Dave Edmunds ===
Plum Crazy were a later (1968–69) reincarnation of the Jets, with Mickey Gee replacing Leonard. They were joined by Dave Edmunds. Because of the fluidity of groups in South Wales, this line up could equally have been called Love Sculpture with Plum Hollis.

- Tony "Plum" Hollis – vocals (Omitted from the credits on both the LP & Point CD)
- Mickey Gee – guitar (Called Micky Lee on the Point CD)
- Martin Ace – bass
- Terry Williams – drums
- Dave Edmunds – guitar

=== Help Yourself with Deke Leonard and BJ Cole ===
Help Yourself had toured with Man on the Good Clean Fun tour of Switzerland. When Man fired Leonard, earlier that year, he moved into Help Yourself's house, and they played on his first solo album Iceberg. Malcolm Morley then suffered from depression, so Leonard temporarily joined, as a replacement, but stayed when Morley returned. On this evening, they were joined by legendary pedal steel guitar player B J Cole. The two tracks are "testament to the band's own magnificent powers of improvisation, too seldom heard on its regular albums".

- Malcolm Morley – guitar and vocal
- Richard Treece – guitar and vocal
- Paul Burton – bass
- Dave Charles – drums
- Deke Leonard – guitar and vocal
- B J Cole – pedal steel guitar

=== Man with Dave Edmunds and Stan Pfeiffer ===
Man's line up had recently undergone a major upheaval. After the successful Greasy Truckers Party (Recorded February 1972) and Live at the Padget Rooms, Penarth (Recorded April 1972) Martin Ace had left and Deke Leonard had been fired (although both were invited to this party). Clive John had rejoined, bringing with him Phil Ryan and Will Youatt, who had been playing together as Iorwerth Pritchard and the Neutrons. This new line up had just released Be Good to Yourself at Least Once a Day, and were joined by Dave Edmunds and Stan Phifer.

- Micky Jones – guitar and vocal
- Will Youatt – bass and vocal
- Clint Space (Clive John) – guitar
- Phil Ryan – organ
- Terry Williams – drums
- Dave Edmunds – guitar
- Stan Pfeiffer – Spontaneous vocal (called Stan Phifer on the original LP)

== Reception ==
Professional ratings
Review scores
Source	Rating
Allmusic	4.5/5 stars
DPRP	(6/10)

== Track listing ==
Side one

1. The Flying Aces - "Welcome to the Party" (Martin Ace, George Ace) 2.20
2. Ducks Deluxe - "Boogaloo Babe" (Sean Tyla) 2.45
3. The Jets - "My Way" (Jerry Capehart, Eddie Cochran) – 4:05
4. The Jets - "Jambalaya" (Hank Williams) – 4.31

Side two

1. Plum Crazy with Dave Edmunds - "Jingle Bells" (James Lord Pierpont) – 0:31
2. Plum Crazy with Dave Edmunds - "Run, Run, Rudolph" (Johnny Marks, Marvin Brodie) – 2:17
3. Help Yourself with Deke Leonard and BJ Cole - "Mona" (Ellas McDaniel) – 11:40

Side three

1. Help Yourself with Deke Leonard and BJ Cole - "Eddie Waring" (Leonard) – 14:03

Side four

1. Man with Dave Edmunds and Stan Pfeiffer - "Life on the Road" (Jones, Williams, Youatt, Ryan, John) – 6.30
2. Man with Dave Edmunds and Stan Pfeiffer - "Shuffle (improvisation)" (Jones, Williams, Youatt, Ryan, John) – 5.00

== Credits ==
- Sleeve notes – "Android Laser" (Andrew Lauder)
- Engineer – Vic Maile
- Producer – "Sheer Luck"
- Sleeve design – Jet Power
- Photographs – Nevis Cameron & Pierre Tubbs

== Release history ==
Double 10" LP (1973) United Artists: UDX/205/6
CD (1997) Point PNTVP110CD
Double 10" LP (2001) Akarma (Italy) AK2020/2
CD re-mix (2007) Esoteric ECLEC 2018

== Reviews ==
There are 2 Allmusic reviews of this album:-
The first, by Dave Thompson, is of the 10" vinyl and gave it four out of five stars.
The second, by Jo-Ann Greene, is of the CD re-release and gave it four and a half stars out of five.
Head Heritage publish Valve's review
