= Call Down the Moon =

Studio album by Man
- Released: March 1995
- Recorded: November 1994
- Studio: Egg Studios, Seattle
- Length: 63:04
- Label: Hypertension Music
- Producer: Man, Ron Sanchez

Man chronology
The Twang Dynasty (1992)	Call Down the Moon (1995)	1998 at the Star Club (1998)

Professional ratings
Review scores
Source	Rating
AllMusic	3.5/5 stars

Call Down the Moon was the eleventh studio album released by the Welsh rock band Man, and only the second since they had reformed in 1983. It was also their first American release in 20 years. It was recorded during November 1994 and released in 1995.

== Track listing ==
All tracks by Man

1. "Call Down the Moon" – 9:25
2. "If I Were You" – 7:33
3. "Dream Away" – 6:04
4. "Blackout" – 5:27
5. "The Man with the X-Ray Eyes" – 7:06
6. "Heaven and Hell" – 8:08
7. "The Girl Is Trouble" – 4:03
8. "Drivin' Around" – 12:20
9. "Burn My Workin' Clothes" – 2:58

== Personnel ==
- Micky Jones – guitar and vocals
- Deke Leonard – keyboard, guitar and vocals
- Martin Ace – bass and vocals
- John Weathers – drums, guitar and vocals
