= Man (Man album) =

Studio album by Man
- Released: March 1971
- Recorded: October 1970
- Studio: Olympic Studios, Barnes, London
- Length: 47:26
- Label: Liberty
- Producer: Mel Baister

Man chronology
2 Ozs of Plastic with a Hole in the Middle (1969)	Man (1971)	Do You Like It Here Now, Are You Settling In? (1971)

Professional ratings
Review scores
Source	Rating
AllMusic	4/5 stars

Man is the third studio album by the Welsh rock band Man and was released March 1971. It was the first album by this line-up, Terry Williams having replaced Jeff Jones on drums, while Martin Ace replaced Ray Williams on bass.

As well as a change in personnel, the album also represented a change in record label from Pye Records to United Artists (released under the UA stable "Liberty" imprint) with whom the band would remain until 1976. Reviews were mixed, particularly regarding the long tracks "Would the Christians...." and "Alchemist" which were an attempt to recreate some of the longer improvised jams that the band performed on stage, but which did not have the same impact on vinyl.

== Music ==
The music of Man contains elements of country rock and heavy metal.

The album contained three shorter tunes: "Country Girl" that showed a clash of direction but showcases some fine Welsh harmonies. "Daughter of the Fireplace", a Leonard-penned rocker, which became a stage favourite (and highlight of Man's 1972 live LP Live at the Padget Rooms, Penarth) while "Romain", a bluesy-shuffle, was written as a reaction to Martin Ace's treatment by a Belgian police officer of the same name when he attempted to intervene in a situation at a music festival; the song remains in the Man live set to the present day.

== Track listing ==
Side one
No.	Title	Writer(s)	Length
1.	"Romain"	Martin Ace, Clive John, Michael Jones, Roger Leonard, Terry Williams	6:11
2.	"Country Girl"	Ace, Leonard	3:08
3.	"Would the Christians Wait Five Minutes? The Lions Are Having a Draw"	Ace, Jones	12:52

Side two
No.	Title	Writer(s)	Length
1.	"Daughter of the Fireplace"	Leonard	5:11
2.	"Alchemist"	Ace, John, Jones, Leonard, Williams	20:41

== Personnel ==
- Michael "Micky" Jones – electric guitar, acoustic guitar, vocals
- Roger "Deke" Leonard – electric guitar, acoustic guitar, piano, steel guitar, vocals
- Clive John – organ, piano, electric guitar, harpsichord, vocals
- Martin Ace – bass guitar, acoustic guitar, vocals
- Terry Williams – drums, percussion; liberty bell on "Daughter"

=== Production ===
- Produced – Mel Baiser for Gem Production
- Engineer – George Chkiantz & Rik ??

== Re-issues ==
The original album was re-issued on CD in 1998 (Point PNTVP117CD)

The album was remastered and re-issued on CD in 2007 (Esoteric eclec 2012) including two bonus tracks:

1. "Daughter of the Fireplace" (Single Version)
2. "Alchemist" (First Version)
