= Revelation (Man album) =

Studio album by Man
- Released: 24 January 1969
- Recorded: December 1968
- Studios: Langland Hotel, Swansea; Pye Studios, London
- Genre: Psychedelic rock
- Length: 42:40
- Label: Pye
- Producer: John Schroeder

Man chronology
Revelation (1969)	2 Ozs of Plastic with a Hole in the Middle (1969)

Professional ratings
Review scores
Source	Rating
AllMusic	4.5/5 stars
Hi-Fi News & Record Review	B:3

Revelation is the debut studio album by the Welsh rock band Man and was released in January 1969. It was noted for the simulated orgasm on "Erotica", which was banned in the United Kingdom.

== Track listing ==
Side one
No.	Title	Writer(s)	Length
1.	"And in the Beginning....."	Roger Leonard	4:22
2.	"Sudden Life"	Leonard, Clive John	4:40
3.	"Empty Room"	John, Ray Williams	3:44
4.	"Puella! Puella! (Woman! Woman!)"	Mike Jones	3:34
5.	"Love"	Leonard	2:52
6.	"Erotica"	Leonard, John, Mike Jones, Jeff Jones, Williams	4:10

Side two
No.	Title	Writer(s)	Length
1.	"Blind Man"	Leonard	4:17
2.	"And Castles Rise in Children's Eyes"	Mike Jones	3:21
3.	"Don't Just Stand There (Come in Out of the Rain)"	Mike Jones	4:15
4.	"The Missing Pieces"	Leonard, John, Martin Ace, Clive Reynolds	1:55
5.	"The Future Hides Its Face"	Leonard	5:30

=== Reissues ===
Revelation was remixed and re-released on CD in May 2009 (Esoteric Eclec 2127) including four bonus tracks:

1. "Erotica" (First Version)
2. "Sudden Life" (Mono Single Mix)
3. "Love" (Mono Single Mix)
4. "Erotica" (Mono Single Mix)

The original album has also been re-released on two CD compilations:

- The Dawn of Man (1997) Recall SMD CD 124
- The Definitive Collection (1998) Castle CCSCD 832.

Both these compilations also include the follow-up album 2 Ozs of Plastic with a Hole in the Middle and bonus singles.

== Personnel ==
- Deke Leonard (credited as Roger Leonard) – guitar, harp, piano, percussion, vocals
- Clive John – organ, piano, guitar, vocals
- Mike "Micky" Jones – lead guitar, vocals
- Jeff Jones – drums, percussion
- Ray Williams – bass (uncredited in original artwork)

Production

- Production and supervision – John Schroeder
- Engineer – Alan Florence
- Sound Effects – Malcolm Eade
