= Down Town Live =

Live album by Man
- Released: 7 November 2002
- Recorded: at the Downtown Blues Club in Hamburg on 23 May 2001
- Label: Altrichter-Music

Man chronology
Endangered Species (2000)	Down Town Live (2002)	Undrugged (2002)

Professional ratings
Review scores
Source	Rating
Allmusic	(not yet rated)

Down Town Live is a live album of the Welsh rock band Man. The album was recorded at the Downtown Blues Club in Hamburg on 23 May 2001. According to the manband-archive, the recording was originally not intended for the general public. But after several months Hans-Werner Altrichter persuaded the band that "It was great music, and deserved its place in the pantheon of the performing arts", so the album was released on 7 November 2002. The recording does not feature the full band line-up at that time, as keyboard player, Gareth Llewelyn Thorrington, had been held up at the airport because of a bomb scare.

== Track listing ==
1. "The Ride and the View" (Leonard)
2. "Love Isn't Love" (Ace, Jones, Leonard, Ryan)
3. "C'mon" (Jones, Ryan, Williams, John)
4. "Hanging' On" (Ace, Jones, Leonard, Ryan)
5. "Conflict of Interest" (Ace, Jones, Leonard, Ryan)
6. "Popemobile" (Ace, Jones, Leonard, Ryan)

== Personnel ==
- Micky Jones - guitar and vocals
- Deke Leonard - guitar, piano and vocals
- Martin Ace - bass guitar and vocals
- Bob Richards - drums
