= Do You Like It Here Now, Are You Settling In? =

Studio album by Man
- Released: November 1971
- Studios: Rockfield Studios, Monmouth, Wales
- Length: 39:11
- Label: United Artists
- Producer: Man

Man chronology
Man (1971)	Do You Like It Here Now, Are You Settling In? (1971)	Greasy Truckers Party (1972)

Do You Like It Here Now, Are You Settling In? is the fourth album by the Welsh rock band Man and was released in November 1971. The album was recorded in August at Rockfield Studios in Monmouthshire, Wales. Sessions took place soon after the band's 'All Good Clean Fun' tour of Switzerland, although a brief break in their German tour schedule during the late spring had resulted in two tracks being written at a studio in Swansea. The album title is apparently a Swansea saying, usually directed at pub landlords of exceptionally long standing.

== Reception ==
Critical reaction to the new album was positive, with some suggesting that the band may break into the big time.

Professional ratings
Review scores
Source	Rating
AllMusic	3/5 stars
DPRP	(8/10)

== Track listing ==
All titles composed by Man.

Side one
No.	Title	Length
1.	"Angel Easy"	4:57
2.	"All Good Clean Fun"	4:31
3.	"We're Only Children"	8:18

Side two
No.	Title	Length
1.	"Many Are Called but Few Get Up"	7:22
2.	"Manillo"	5:26
3.	"Love Your Life"	8:37

== Personnel ==
- Michael "Micky" Jones – electric guitar, acoustic guitar, vocals
- Roger "Deke" Leonard – electric guitar, acoustic guitar, vocals
- Clive John – organ, piano, vocals
- Martin Ace – bass guitar, acoustic guitar, vocals
- Terry Williams – drums

Production

- Engineers – Kingsley "Bass Drum" Ward, Rip van Ralph (Ralph Down), Edmundo Razz (Dave Edmunds)
- Mixing engineer – George Chkiantz
