= Malcolm Morley =

Malcolm Morley may refer to:

- Malcolm Morley (artist) (1931-2018), British-American visual artist and painter
- Malcolm Morley (musician) English rock singer and musician
