= Greasy Truckers Party =

Live album by Various artists
- Released: 28 April 1972
- Recorded: 13 February 1972
- Venues: Roundhouse, London
- Genre: Rock
- Length: 1:27:30
- Label: United Artists – UDX 203/4

Greasy Truckers chronology
| Greasy Truckers Party (1972) | Greasy Truckers Live at Dingwalls Dance Hall (1973) |

Man chronology
| Do You Like It Here Now, Are You Settling In? (1971) | Greasy Truckers Party (1972) | Live at the Padget Rooms, Penarth (1972) |

Greasy Truckers Party is a 1972 live album by various artists recorded at a February 1972 Greasy Truckers concert at the Roundhouse in London. The concert featured three bands, Man, Brinsley Schwarz, and Hawkwind, and musician Magic Michael. Originally a double vinyl album, in a limited edition of 20,000 and sold at just £1.50, it rapidly sold out, and became a collector's item.

In the world of British underground rock, the Greasy Truckers Party ... ... looms about as large as the Monterey International Pop Festival does in American rock lore; it wasn't the biggest gig ever played by the bands involved, but for reasons of exposure, and resulting word-of-mouth, and the excerpted live album that followed, it came to define what they were capable of.

— Bruce Eder, Allmusic

Greasy Truckers (their name being a parody of the D'Oyly Carte Opera Company) were "a loose organisation of individuals whose ideals were based on those of the Diggers in San Francisco, recycling money into worthwhile causes." This album was the first of two albums recorded at concerts in London organised by Greasy Truckers, the second being Greasy Truckers Live at Dingwalls Dance Hall (1974). All proceeds from the concert and LP sales went to Greasy Truckers' project to build a hostel in Notting Hill Gate.

The concert was due to run from 3 p.m. until midnight and include performances by Byzantium and others, but wage disputes between the unions and the government had led to frequent power cuts, one of which occurred in the early evening, giving an unusual album track "Power cut".
The fire brigade asked the audience to leave, but when power was resumed, and the audience re-admitted, hundreds more people came in. In defiance of the Fire Brigade, many people stayed inside, temporary lighting was set up, and the audience was entertained by eccentric folk band Skinner's Rats who did not require amplification. They started with the opening of Richard Strauss's "Also Sprach Zarathustra" before breaking into a medley of reels and being joined on stage by a troop of Morris dancers - the Blackheath Foot and Death Men.

The power cut had affected Hawkwind's synthesisers, which were very temperamental, leading to their apologies, and having to restart their act after a breakdown.

== Reception ==
Professional ratings
Review scores
| Source | Rating |
|---|---|
| Allmusic | 3/5 stars |

== Track listing ==
Side one (22:00)

1. Man – "Spunk Rock" (Ace/Jones/Leonard/Williams)

Side two (22:00)

1. Man – "Angel Easy" (Ace/John/Jones/Leonard/Williams)
2. DJ Andy Dunkley – Speech
3. DJ Andy Dunkley – Power cut
4. Brinsley Schwarz – "Wonder Woman" (Toussaint)
5. Brinsley Schwarz – "Its Just My Way of Saying Thank You" (Lowe)
6. Brinsley Schwarz – "I'm Ahead If I Can Quit While I'm Behind" (Ford)

Side three (22:00)

1. Brinsley Schwarz – "Midnight Train" (trad. arranged Brinsley Schwarz)
2. Brinsley Schwarz – "Surrender to the Rhythm" (Lowe)
3. Magic Michael – "Music Belongs to the People" (Michael)

Side four (21:30)

1. Hawkwind – "Master of the Universe" (Turner/Brock)
2. Hawkwind – "Born to Go" (Calvert/Brock)

== Releases and re-issues ==
- The original vinyl album was also released in Germany (Gamma 3265) and Japan (Liberty LLP-93075).
- The Hawkwind tracks were included on the 1997 remastered version of Space Ritual (EMI).
- The Man tracks were released in 1997 as Greasy Truckers Party (Voiceprint, June 2001, PNTVP104CD).
- The complete recording of the concert was released as a triple-CD box set on 15 October 2007, with all the tracks being new mixes (EMI) - 0999 503235 2 4.
- The complete Hawkwind performance was issued as a double vinyl album in a gatefold sleeve by Banquet Records for Record Store Day in 2021 - RSD21-86.

== 2007 box set release ==
This box set includes the original take of Hawkwind's "Silver Machine" single, although this was remixed and overdubbed in the studio, with Robert Calvert's original lead vocal being replaced by one sung by Lemmy.

Disc one

1. Man – "Spunk Rock" (Jones/Williams/Ryan) – 22.22
2. Man – "Many Are Called But Few Get Up" (Ace/Jones/Leonard/Williams/John) - 10.13
3. Man – "Angel Easy" (Ace/Jones/Leonard/Williams/John) – 5.50
4. Man – "Bananas - Early Instrumental Version" (Jones/Ryan/Williams/John) – 14.46
5. Man – "Romain" (Ace/Jones/Leonard/Williams/John) – 11.29

Disc two

1. Brinsley Schwarz – "Intro" – 1.05
2. Brinsley Schwarz – "Country Girl" (Lowe) – 3.12
3. Brinsley Schwarz – "One More Day" (Gomm) – 3.02
4. Brinsley Schwarz – "Unknown Number" (Lowe) – 2.46
5. Brinsley Schwarz – "She's Got to Be Real" (Robinson/White)– 3.34
6. Brinsley Schwarz – "Home Work" (Clark/Perkins) – 2.54
7. Brinsley Schwarz – "Nervous on the Road (But Can't Stay at Home)" (Lowe) – 5.11
8. Brinsley Schwarz – "Range War" (Gomm) – 2.25
9. Brinsley Schwarz – "Silver Pistol" (Lowe) – 3.38
10. Brinsley Schwarz – "Going Down the Road" (Trad Arranged Brinsley Schwarz) – 6.02
11. Brinsley Schwarz – "Midnight Train" (Trad Arranged Brinsley Schwarz) – 4.22
12. Brinsley Schwarz – "Private Number" (Jones/Bell) – 3.52
13. Brinsley Schwarz – "It's Just My Way of Saying Thank You" (Lowe) – 6.34
14. Brinsley Schwarz – "Wonder Woman" (Toussaint) – 4.22
15. Brinsley Schwarz – "I'm Ahead If I Can Quit While I'm Behind" (Ford) – 4.25
16. Brinsley Schwarz – "Surrender to the Rhythm" (Lowe) – 4.03
17. Magic Michael – "Music Belongs to the People" (Magic Michael) – 9.44

Disc three

1. Hawkwind – "Announcement/Apology" – 1.57
2. Hawkwind – "This is Your Captain Speaking (Breakdown)" (Robert Calvert) – 1.37
3. Hawkwind – "This is Your Captain Speaking" (Robert Calvert) – 2.42
4. Hawkwind – "You Shouldn't Do That" (Nik Turner/Dave Brock) – 10.12
5. Hawkwind – "The Awakening" (Robert Calvert) – 6.07
6. Hawkwind – "Master of the Universe" (Nik Turner/Dave Brock) – 8.35
7. Hawkwind – "Paranoia" (Hawkwind/Dave Brock) – 5.01
8. Hawkwind – "Earth Calling" (Robert Calvert) – 3.23
9. Hawkwind – "Silver Machine" (Dave Brock/Robert Calvert) – 4.26
10. Hawkwind – "Welcome to the Future" (Robert Calvert) – 3.35
11. Hawkwind – "Born to Go" (Dave Brock/Robert Calvert) – 9.07
12. Hawkwind – "Brainstorm (Jam)" (Nik Turner) – 9.51
13. DJ Andy Dunkley – "End Announcement" – 1:49

The songwriting credits on the re-release sleeve notes have several anomalies e.g. different credits to the vinyl album, and listing full names for Hawkwind tracks, whilst two of Man's track credits include Ryan, although he did not join the band until several months later.

== Personnel ==
=== Man ===
- Micky Jones — guitars, vocals
- Deke Leonard — guitars, vocals
- Martin Ace — bass, vocals
- Terry Williams — drums

=== Brinsley Schwarz ===
- Brinsley Schwarz — guitar, piano
- Ian Gomm — guitar, bass, vocals
- Billy Rankin — drums
- Bob Andrews — piano, organ, vocals
- Nick Lowe — bass, guitar, vocals

=== Magic Michael ===
- Magic Michael (Michael Cousins) — acoustic guitar, vocals

=== Hawkwind ===
- Dave Brock – guitars, vocals
- Nik Turner – saxophone, flute, vocals
- Lemmy (Ian Kilmister) – bass guitar, vocals
- Dik Mik (Michael Davies) – Audio Generator,
- Del Dettmar – synthesizer
- Simon King – drums
- Robert Calvert – vocals

=== Production ===
- Vic Maile — audio engineer, mixing
- Paschal Byrne & Mark Powell — mixing
- Jet Power — design (Original LP)
- Phil Smee — design (2007 CD re-release)
- Mark Powell — liner notes

== Charts ==
| Chart (2021) | Peak position |
|---|---|
| Scottish Albums (Official Charts) | 64 |
| UK Rock & Metal Albums (Official Charts) | 5 |
