= Sean Tyla =

English musical artist (1947–2020)

- Born: John Michael Kenneth Tyler; 3 August 1947; Barlow, West Riding of Yorkshire, England
- Died: 17 May 2020 (aged 72)
- Genres: Rock; rock and roll; pub rock
- Occupations: Musician; songwriter
- Instruments: Guitar; keyboards
- Years active: 1971–2020
- Website: seantyla.com

Sean Tyla (born John Michael Kenneth Tyler, 3 August 1947 – 17 May 2020) was an English rock guitarist, keyboardist, vocalist and songwriter, sometimes known as the "Godfather of Boogie". Best known for his work with Ducks Deluxe and Tyla Gang, he also played with Help Yourself, Joan Jett, and Deke Leonard, and appeared solo.

== Early career ==
He initially toured with Geno Washington & The Ram Jam Band, but made his first record "Miracles" with a band called Third World (not the reggae band Third World formed in 1973) which was released on CBS in 1970, He also recorded an unreleased album with Maynard Ferguson.

== Help Yourself ==
In 1971, Tyla became a roadie with Help Yourself, who based their psychedelic instrumental number "All Electric Fur Trapper" on a fantasy tale Tyla was writing, part of which appeared in the sleeve of their Strange Affair album. He played on Help Yourself's Sounds of the Seventies broadcast and co-wrote "American Mother" on their Beware the Shadow album. He also recorded part of their fifth album, recorded in 1973, but the album was shelved until it was finally completed and released as 5 in 2004.

== Ducks Deluxe ==
In February 1972, Tyla formed Ducks Deluxe, initially with Help Yourself's bassist, the late Ken Whaley, guitarist Martin Belmont and percussionist Michael Cousins. Cousins was replaced by drummer Tim Roper and Nick Garvey also joined. Ducks Deluxe were one of the founding acts of the Pub rock circuit, with more up-tempo, energetic performances than many other pub rock acts. They recorded three albums, made one appearance on The Old Grey Whistle Test and recorded two Peel Sessions. Ducks Deluxe split in 1975.

== Tyla Gang ==
Following the break-up of Ducks Deluxe, Sean Tyla formed Tyla Gang in late autumn of 1975 with his brother Gary, Phil Nedin (drums) and Peter O'Sullivan (bass) from Welsh band Jack Straw. In the spring of 1976, Richard Treece from Help Yourself joined the band. Within a few months Gary Tyler and Treece left the band and Welshman Tweke Lewis, formerly of Man, became the new guitarist. They went into Pebble Beach studio in Worthing, and under the guidance of producer Tony Platt recorded 6 tracks including "Suicide jockey" and "Cannons of the Boogie Night" as well as "Styrofoam" and "Texas Chainsaw Massacre Boogie". These latter two tracks were released as the "double B-side" 4th single on the legendary pub rock proto punk early punk rock Stiff Records label. Tyla also produced Stiff's eighth single Plummet Airlines' "Silver Shirt" / "This Is The World".

In April 1977, two further tracks from that session were released ("Cannons of the Boogie Night" and "Suicide Jockey") on Skydog Records. In 1977 the second Tyla Gang band were formed consisting of guitarist Bruce Irvine, bassist Brian Turrington and drummer Mike Desmarais; Turrington and Desmarais having played together in The Winkies, including during their stint as a backing band for Brian Eno, and Turrington had also appeared on a number of Eno’s albums as a bassist and co-writing the widely covered track "Third Uncle".

Although unsigned, the Gang attracted critical attention and played two Peel Sessions in 1977 (30 May and 4 October). They eventually signed a contract with the California-based Beserkley label in 1977 and released their first album, Yachtless in 1978. Reviewing the LP in Christgau's Record Guide: Rock Albums of the Seventies (1981), Robert Christgau wrote: "Punk has not been good for former Duck Deluxe Sean T. because it's meant urbanization. I have nothing against the slick, hooky power chords his pub-rock has evolved into, not in theory. But when his charming if overly mythic tales of fireballs and West Texas running boards evolve into 'The Young Lords' (give me a break, Bruce Springsteen) and 'On the Street' (give me a break, Bob Geldof), I begin to crave recognizable human detail."

Part way through recording their next album Moonproof, Turrington left and Whaley joined to finish the album; this line-up recorded a Peel Session on 9 August 1978. Richard Treece also rejoined but Beserkley's UK operation went bankrupt in 1979, and Tyla disbanded the Gang shortly after.

In 2010, the Tyla Gang reformed in their original line-up, touring Sweden during the fall. In 2013, they added John McCoy of Gillan and Mammoth fame to replace original member, Brian Turrington, who had taken a leave of absence for personal reasons. The Gang have released two albums since their reformation, 2010's "Rewired", a compilation of lost studio and live recordings and as of 18 March 2013, a new studio album, Stereo Tactics. In 2015 The Tyla Gang released a live set, Live In Stockholm recorded at the Akkurat Bar in Stockholm, Sweden in 2013 on Angel Air Records and will be releasing a 3-CD anthology, Pool Hall Punks through Cherry Red Records in May 2016 to coincide with Sean's 70th Birthday Tour.

== Solo career ==
Tyla embarked on a solo career, encouraged by Roger Daltrey who allowed him use of The Who's Ramport Studio. He recorded in California with Mike Nesmith and signed a five-album deal with Polydor, although he only released three albums. The first album, Just Popped Out, was recorded with assistance from many musicians, including several former bandmates such as Nick Garvey, Micky Groome, Malcolm Morley, Tim Roper and Pete Thomas. Just Popped Out included Tyla's first US hit single, "Breakfast in Marin", which also became a top ten single in Germany in 1980, but the single had to be withdrawn after Tyla was sued "for supposedly plagiarising the title from a play."

Tyla guested on Joan Jett's eponymous 1980 album, re-released as Bad Reputation in 1981, and I Love Rock 'n' Roll in 1981.

Tyla's second solo album, Redneck in Babylon (1981), was critically less acclaimed than the first, and used a smaller band comprising Tyla, Paul Simmons, Gerald Moffett, Micky Groome, John Earle, Carlene Carter and Rebop Kwaku Baah, whilst his third album, Rhythm of the Swing, was released in 1983.

== The Force ==
In 1981, in addition to recording his solo albums, and guesting with Joan Jett, Tyla and Man guitarist Deke Leonard formed The Force, together with Micky Groome (bass) and Paul Simmons (drums). After extensive touring, they recorded an eponymous album, The Force, recorded and released in Germany, and the single "Close to a Headline".

In 1982, Tyla suffered severe stage fright at Dingwalls in Camden "in the middle of the set Sean shuffled up to me and whispered in my ear, 'I'm just going off'... When we got backstage Sean was a real mess, said he couldn't face it any more." Tyla stopped performing live and The Force mutated into another Deke Leonard's Iceberg.

Tyla retired from the music business in 1985, and became a web-designer.

== Return ==
In 2007, Tyla resumed public performances with a new Gang comprising Vaughan Lonsdale and Mick Yarre (guitars), Dave Rickaby (bass) and Ken Ward (drums). They recorded a CD Back in the Saddle which was released in 2008 on Tyla's own label; Hawkhead Records.

Following a move south, another Tyla Gang line up was formed from Bournemouth-based band Relentless, consisting of Howard Gillespie on Lead Guitar and Vocals, Gary Gahan on Bass Guitar and Vocals and Dave Ironside on Drums. This line up performed a limited number of gigs with the intention of touring but it wasn't long before Sean was offered the opportunity to work once more with his former bandmates from Ducks Deluxe. The band also co-wrote two new tunes with Sean. A riff driven comment on modern life called Runaway and a classic Tyla call to arms Lock and Load. There is a live recording of this line up at Mr Kyps taken from the mixing desk and the show was recorded in HD video.

Tyla also played with Ducks Deluxe, when they reformed in October 2007, to celebrate the 35th anniversary of their original formation. Tyla rejoining Martin Belmont, Micky Groome and Billy Rankin. The success of this anniversary gig led to further concerts in France and Spain in 2008 and a tour of Sweden in 2009, by when the line up was Tyla and Belmont with bassist Kevin Foster (of Hank Wangford and The Lost Cowboys) and drummer Jim Russell (of Stretch and The Inmates) They released a mini CD of new tracks Box of Shorts in 2009 and a full album, Side Tracks And Smokers in 2010, comprising a mixture of unreleased early recordings and current material. They then released a live set recorded in 2009 in Monte Carlo entitled Riviera Shuffle but this was only available through eBay. A live album, Rockin' At The Moon recorded at the Half Moon in London in September 2012 was released in May 2013 on Mystic Records.

Tyla toured with both Tyla Gang and Ducks Deluxe in 2013, but Ducks Deluxe were disbanded "for good" that Christmas. Tyla, Billy Bremner and 2 Swedish musicians, were founder members of Stockholm-based band Trouble Boys, who released an album Bad Trouble in September 2012, and toured extensively throughout 2013 and 2014. Tyla left the band in 2015.

== Death ==
Tyla died on 17 May 2020. According to an appreciation by British music journalist Will Birch, Tyla had chronic liver disease.

== Book ==
Sean Tyla's autobiography Jumpin' in the Fire (ISBN 9780956642004) was published by Soundcheck Books on 20 October 2010. It features jacket artwork by the famous Stiff Records designer Tobbe Stuhre, and a foreword by Will Birch. The final volume of the autobiography was available in 2016.

== Album discography ==
With Ducks Deluxe

- Ducks Deluxe (1974) RCA
- All Too Much (1975)
- Jumpin' (EP) (1975) Skydog
- Taxi to the Terminal Zone (1975) RCA
- Don't Mind Rockin' Tonite (1978) RCA
- Last Night of a Pub Rock Band (1981)
- John Peel Sessions (2007) Hux
- Box of Shorts (2009) Hawkhead
- Side Tracks & Smokers (2010) Hawkhead

With Little Bob Story

- Off the Rails (1977)
- Living in the Fast Lane (1977) Crypto
- Vacant Heart (1983) RCA

With Tyla Gang

- Yachtless (1977) Beserkley
- Moonproof (1978) Beserkley
- Stereo Tactics (2013) Ball & Chain Records

Sean Tyla

- Just Popped Out (1980) Polydor
- Redneck in Babylon (1981) RCA
- Rhythm of the Swing (1983) RCA
- Back in the Saddle (2007) Hawkhead

With Joan Jett

- Bad Reputation (1981)
- I Love Rock 'n' Roll (1981)

With Help Yourself

- Strange Affair (1971)
- 5 (2004)

With Deke Leonard

- The Force (1981) DGG/Polydor
- Freedom and Chains (2005) Angel Air

With Martin Belmont

- Guest List (2009) Gold Top

With Trouble Boys

- Bad Trouble (2012) Ball and Chain Records

Various artist compilations

- Christmas at the Patti (1973) UA
- A Bunch of Stiff Records (1976) Stiff
- Hits Greatest Stiffs (1977) Stiff
- Spitballs (1978) Beserkley
- Beserk Times – Live over Germany (1978) Beserkley
- Beserkley's Back (1978) Beserkley
- Hope & Anchor Front Row Festival (1978) Warner
- Stiff Records Box Set (1992) Demon
- Naughty Rhythms: The Best of Pub Rock (1996) EMI
- Beserkley's Best (1998) Blackheart
- Glitterbest: 20 Pre Punk 'n' Glam Terrace Stompers (2004)
- The Big Stiff Box Set (2007)
