= 2 Ozs of Plastic with a Hole in the Middle =

Studio album by Man
- Released: September 1969
- Recorded: 1969
- Studios: Pye Studios, London
- Length: 37:52
- Label: Dawn
- Producer: John Schroeder

Man chronology
Revelation (1969)	2 Ozs of Plastic with a Hole in the Middle (1969)	Man (1971)

Professional ratings
Review scores
Source	Rating
AllMusic	3/5 stars
Hi-Fi News & Record Review	A/B:1

2 Ozs of Plastic with a Hole in the Middle is the second studio album by the Welsh rock band Man and was released in September 1969.

== Track listing ==
Source: Discogs

Side one
No.	Title	Writer(s)	Length
1.	"(a) Prelude" (1:49) "(b) The Storm" (10:29)	Deke Leonard, Micky Jones; Leonard, M. Jones	12:18
2.	"It Is As It Must Be (Note: Originally intended to be titled "Shit on the World".)"	Clive John, Ray Williams	8:27

Side two
No.	Title	Writer(s)	Length
1.	"Spunk Box (Note: Originally intended to be titled "Spunk Rock".)"	M. Jones, John	5:45
2.	"My Name Is Jesus Smith"	Leonard, M. Jones (incorrectly credited as G. Jones)	4:03
3.	"Parchment and Candles"	Leonard	1:51
4.	"Brother Arnold's Red and White Striped Tent"	Leonard, M. Jones	5:04

== Personnel ==
- Michael "Micky" Jones – lead guitar, vocals
- Roger "Deke" Leonard – guitar, harp, piano, harpsichord, percussion, vocals
- Clive John – organ, piano, guitar, vocals
- Ray Williams – bass, vocals
- Jeff Jones – drums, percussion
- "Plug" – drums on "parchment and candles"

=== Production ===
- Producer – John Schroeder
- Engineers – Howard Barrow, Alan Florence & Brian Humphries
- Liner notes – Dinnes Cruickshank

== Re-releases ==
2 Ozs of Plastic with a Hole in the Middle was re-released on CD in May 2009 (Esoteric Eclec 2128) including 3 bonus tracks:-

1. "My Name Is Jesus Smith" (Alternative version)
2. "A Sad Song" (Grasshopper)
3. "Walkin' the Dogma" ("Spunk Box" demo)

The original album has also been re-released on two CD compilations:-

- The Dawn of Man (1997) Recall SMD CD 124
- The Definitive Collection (1998) Castle CCSCD 832.

Both these compilations also include Man's previous album Revelation and bonus singles.
