= Undrugged =

Studio album by Man
- Released: April 2002
- Length: 49:12
- Label: Point Records

Man chronology
Endangered Species (2000)	Undrugged (2002)	Diamonds and Coal (2006)

Professional ratings
Review scores
Source	Rating
AllMusic	2.5/5 stars

Undrugged is a studio album by the Welsh rock band Man and was released in April 2002. The album was recorded in two separate sessions, five years apart and with different line-ups. The first recording session is from Lampeter in 1996. The album was then completed in a second session 2001 in Hendrefoilans Studios in Swansea. The Lampeter session was engineered by Al Cotton and the line-up consisted of Micky Jones, Deke Leonard, Martin Ace and Terry Williams. The line-up in 2001 consisted of Micky Jones, Deke Leonard, Martin Ace, Bob Richards and Gareth Thorrington.

== Track listing ==
1. "Scotch Corner" (Micky Jones, Deke Leonard, Morley, Ken Whaley, Terry Williams) – 6:33
2. "Babe, I'm Gonna Leave" (Bennett, Anna Bredon, Darling) – 4:33
3. "I Always Thought the Walrus Was Protected" (Martin Ace) – 4:09
4. "Dream Away" (Leonard) – 6:03
5. "Manillo" (Ace) – 4:32
6. "Asylum" (Jones) – 5:03
7. "Trying to Get to You" (Rose Marie McCoy, Charlie Singleton) – 3:25
8. "Listen to Me, Sister" (Leonard) – 2:52
9. "Georgia on My Mind" (Hoagy Carmichael, Stuart Gorrell) – 3:44
10. "Sail on Sailor" (Tandyn Almer, Ray Kennedy, Van Dyke Parks, Jack Rieley, Brian Wilson) – 3:35
11. "Day and Night" (Jones, Leonard, Ken Whaley, Terry Williams) – 4:43

== Personnel ==
- Micky Jones – guitar, vocals
- Deke Leonard – guitar, keyboards, vocals, liner notes
- Gareth Thorrington – piano, organ, synthesizer (3, 7–10)
- Martin Ace – bass, vocals
- Terry Williams – drums (1, 2, 4–6, 11)
- Bob Richards – drums (3, 7–10)
