= 1998 at the Star Club =

Live album by Man
- Released: Summer 1998
- Recorded: 27 March 1998
- Venue: the Star Club Oberhausen in Germany.
- Length: 141:00
- Label: Krucker

Man chronology
Call Down The Moon (1995)	1998 at the Star Club (1998)	Endangered Species (2000)

1998 at the Star Club is a live album by the Welsh rock band Man recorded on 27 March 1998 at the Star Club in Oberhausen in Germany. The recordings of the full gig were issued as double CD in the summer of 1998.

== Track listing ==
=== Disc one ===
1. "The Ride and the View" – 12:45
2. "C'mon" – 26:22
3. "Do It" – 9:42
4. "(Something In My Heart Says) No" – 6:20
5. "Drivin Around" – 17:20

=== Disc two ===
1. "Band Intro" – 2:01
2. "Many Are Called But Few Get Up/The Storm" – 13:48
3. "Bananas" – 16:05
4. "Romain" – 5:36
5. "Spunk Rock" – 22:33

== Personnel ==
- Martin Ace – bass, tuba, vocals
- Micky Jones – guitar, vocals
- Deke Leonard – guitar, piano, vocals
- Bob Richards – drums
- Phil Ryan – keyboards
