= Sassafras (band) =

Welsh rock band

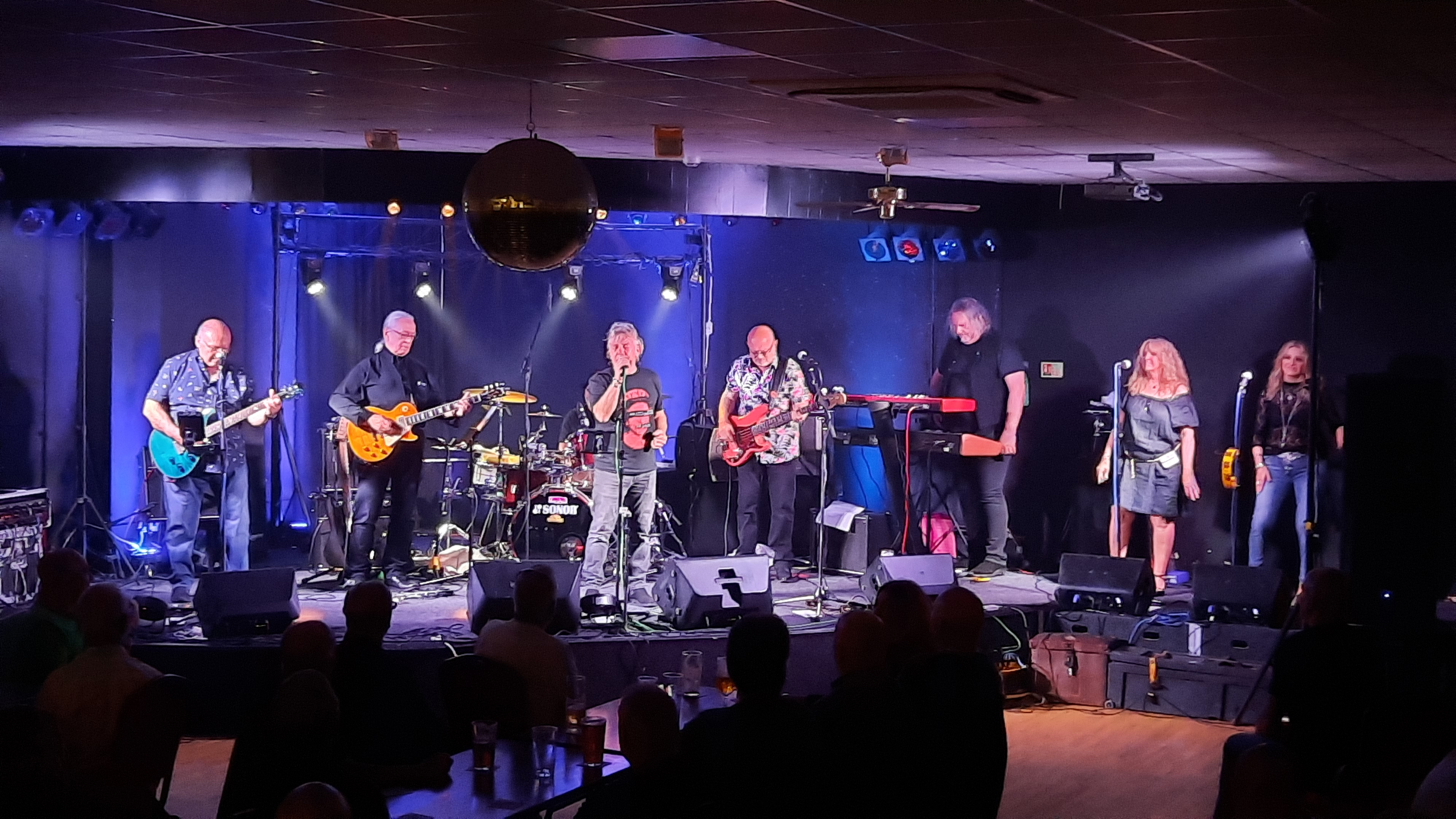
- Sassafras playing at the Earl Haig, Cardiff in June 2022

Background information
- Origin: South Wales
- Genres: Rock; progressive rock; country rock
- Years active: 1970–2022
- Labels: Polyfor; Chrysalis; Iberico; Esoteric
- Members: Dai Shell; Rob Reynolds; Garry Davis; Marco James; Ralph Evans; Ray Jones; Ricky John Holt; Robert Jones; Terry Bennett; Chris Sharley

Sassafras are a rock band from South Wales first formed in 1970. They play a mix of rock and roll, progressive rock and country rock with the emphasis on vocal harmony. The use of twin guitar solos, played by original members Dai Shell and Ralph Evans, continues to be a distinctive feature of their music. The band holds the UK record for the group performing the greatest number of live gigs in a year.

== History ==
The band was formed in South Wales in 1970 with guitarist Ralph Evans, bassist Ricky John Holt and drummer Rob Reynolds. David (Dai) Shell, a noted Cardiff guitarist, joined soon afterwards.

The band signed to George Martin's AIR Productions in 1972 with a line-up completed by Terry Bennett on vocals and Robert 'Congo' Jones on drums. The band released their debut album, Expecting Company, on Polydor in 1973.

The band toured America's larger venues with such headlining groups as Ten Years After, Fleetwood Mac and Peter Frampton, played at festivals and achieved good press coverage, but never found real commercial success.

The band has been described as "a sort-of Welsh Fleetwood Mac/Eagles hybrid, with soaring west-coast melodies and a real roadtrip rock feel". In the early 1970s they held the record for highest number of gigs in a single year, with their 332 beating Slade by one. The band were still performing in 2022,

Galloni, James and Ray Jones later joined Son of Man, led by George Jones, who play music by Man, as well as their own compositions.

== Personnel ==
- Dai Shell – guitars
- Ralph Evans – guitars, backing vocals
- Rob Reynolds – drums
- Ricky John Holt – bass
- Terry Bennett – lead vocals, percussion
- Steve Finn – bass, backing vocals
- Robert 'Congo' Jones – drums
- Ray Jones – bass guitar, vocals
- Richard Galloni – vocals
- Garry Davis – drums
- Marco James – keyboards, violin, mandolin
- Chris Sharley – drums, backing vocals
- Andy Coles – drums

== Discography ==
=== Singles ===
- "Oh My (Don't It Make You Want To Cry)", 1974, Polydor: 2058 497
- "Wheelin' 'N' Dealin'", 1975, Chrysalis: CHS 2063

=== Albums ===
- Expecting Company, 1973, Polydor: 2383 245 (reissued on CD, 2014, Esoteric Recordings)
- Wheelin' 'N' Dealin', 1975, Chrysalis: CHR 1076
- Riding High, 1976, Chrysalis: CHR 1100
- Sassafras Live, 2002, Iberico Records: IB89001
- Wheelin' 'N' Dealin' / Riding High, 2005, Gott Discs: GOTTCD026
- Expecting Company, 2014, CD re-issue, Esoteric Recordings, plus two bonus tracks

=== DVDs ===
- Sassafras Live DVD, 2002, Iberico Records
