= Ken Whaley =

- Born: Kenneth John Whaley; 5 November 1946; Vienna, Austria
- Died: 8 May 2013 (aged 66) London, England
- Genres: Rock; Rock and roll Psychedelic rock Progressive rock
- Occupations: Musician, songwriter
- Instrument: Bass guitar
- Years active: 1967–2012
- Formerly of: Help Yourself, Ducks Deluxe, Deke Leonard's Iceberg, Man, The Tyla Gang, The Archers, The Green Ray

Ken Whaley (5 November 1946 – 8 May 2013) was an Austrian-born bass guitar player, best known as a founding member of Help Yourself and Ducks Deluxe, and as a member of Deke Leonard's Iceberg, Man, and The Tyla Gang. He also played with The Archers and The Green Ray.

== Early career ==
Whaley was born in Vienna to a British serviceman and a local girl, who raised him in Epping, Essex. His father became a newspaper photographer, which led to him becoming a local newspaper reporter, rising to be a sub-editor of the Islington Gazette in the early 1970s. He was, at the same time, playing bass in bands such as "Black Cat Bones" in the 1960s before joining "Growth". In January 1970, he was living in Golborne Road, Portobello, where he knew Paul Burton, a roadie, who knew that Malcolm Morley was looking for a bass player for his new band, Help Yourself, to which he suggested Whaley for the role.

He played on Help Yourself's eponymous first album, and on the Downhome Rhythm Kings package with Ernie Graham and Brinsley Schwarz, which led to him appearing on Ernie Graham's eponymous album, before he was sacked from Help Yourself in April 1971 "a sad tale that is probably best glossed over" .

Whaley moved in with former Help Yourself roadie Sean Tyla and, together with ex Brinsley Schwarz roadie Martin Belmont on guitars, and Magic Michael (Michael Cousins) on percussion, formed Ducks Deluxe in February 1972. Cousins was soon replaced by drummer Tim Roper, and former Flamin' Groovies roadie, Nick Garvey, also joined. Playing more energetic music than most others on the London pub-rock circuit, the Ducks soon had a twice weekly booking at the Tally Ho in Kentish Town, and a manager, Dai Davies.

Whaley left before Ducks Deluxe recorded anything.

Although it has been stated that Whaley left Ducks Deluxe to rejoin Help Yourself, in December 1972, both bands performed at the Christmas at the Patti concert, but Whaley was in neither band.

In 1973, Help Yourself proposed touring with Roger Ruskin Spear, the Flying Aces and Vivian "Spiv" Morris, in a vaudeville show called "Happy Days", which was to be held in a circus tent. They started recording material for this in January, but their bassist, Paul Burton was unhappy with the proposed theatrical tour, so he left. Whaley returned and the band started recording their new album in February, finishing the Happy Days album in March and the Help Yourself album in April, when they also recorded their second Peel Session. After a two-month "Happy Days" tour, the fourth album, The Return of Ken Whaley, was released, with the Happy Days album included free with the first 5,000 copies.

The Happy Days tour included Roger Ruskin Spear which led to Whaley performing on Ruskin Spear's 1973 album Unusual

Help Yourself started recording their fifth album in July 1973, with a line-up augmented by Sean Tyla. The album was to be called 5 and a cover was commissioned from Rick Griffin. They only had "half formed ideas" and although they eventually laid down 8 tracks, they gave up recording and disbanded in August 1973. They reformed for "The Amazing ZigZag Concert" on 28 April 1974 with a core line up of Morley, Treece, Whaley and Charles with Burton and Leonard guesting.

Being incomplete, 5 was not issued, the album was finally completed in 2002/2003 by Morley, Treece and Whaley, with Kevin Spacey on drums, as Charles had other commitments. The album was eventually released in 2004.

Later in 1973, Whaley recorded with Deke Leonard's Iceberg; although he did not perform with Iceberg on that autumn's "Up for the Day" tour with Man, he joined them in November 1973. Leonard was invited to rejoin Man in January 1974 and agreed to take Whaley and Morley with him.

Also in 1974, Whaley recorded the album Fish with Barry Melton, formerly of Country Joe and The Fish, which was released in 1975

Whilst with Man, Whaley recorded Rhinos, Winos and Lunatics which became Man's highest-charting album, at No24 in the UK, and toured USA on The 1999 Party tour with Hawkwind. He then recorded Slow Motion and toured the US again. The tour was extended, but Whaley had had enough and left the band, so he did not play the final concerts with John Cipollina.

Shortly after returning to England, Whaley joined The Tyla Gang, led by Sean Tyla, appearing on the albums Moonproof (1978) and Just Popped Out (1980). He took up journalism again, and in 1982 returned to the Izlington Gazette where he was a sub-editor until 1992.

== The Archers and The Green Ray ==
In 1987, Whaley, Simon Haspeck (guitar) and former Yachts drummer Bob Bellis supported US Singer/Guitarist Rene Miller on a UK tour. After Miller left, they continued as a trio before recruiting guitarist Richard Treece (who had played with Whaley in Help Yourself, Iceberg and The Tyla Gang) in 1988, and calling themselves The Archers.

After recording a demo, Bellis left, so Whaley's brother Simon became the drummer. After seeing The Archers at a Man convention, Nigel Cross released a vinyl LP on his own Shagrat label in October 1993, but shortly after, Haspeck had a motorbike accident, which prevented concerts to promote the album.

In 1994, Slithy Tove guitarist Simon Burgin joined. They composed some songs in a different style to The Archers so changed their name to The Green Ray to avoid confusion with the old band. In 1995 The Green Ray, recorded the album Sighs, Whales and Trees (a play on names:- Simon's Whaley and Burgin, Whaley's, Ken and Simon, and Richard Treece) which was also released on the Shagrat label.

In 1995, Whaley and Richard Treece also started a collaboration with Ron Sanchez of US-based band Donovans Brain.

1996 saw the eponymous second album – The Green Ray, on the Father Yod/Soft Cloud label. Many gigs followed, including concerts with Man, and performing at Terrastock 3 in 1999.

In 2000, Burgin died of a brain haemorrhage and original guitarist Simon Haspeck rejoined. After extensive concerts, they recorded Fragile World, which was released on CD in December 2004

Whaley continued to play with The Green Ray until 2012, when lung cancer forced him to stand down. Whaley died in London, on 8 May 2013, aged 66. The Green Ray continue to this day with Jeff Gibbs on bass guitar and vocals.

== Discography ==
With Help Yourself

- Help Yourself (1971)
- The Return of Ken Whaley (1973)
- Happy Days (1973)
- 5 (2004)
- The Amazing ZigZag Concert (2010)

With Man

- Rhinos, Winos and Lunatics (1974)
- Slow Motion (1974)
- 1999 Party Tour (1998)
- Live in London 1975 (1988)
- Rare Man (1999)
- Man Alive (2003)
- History of Man: Evolution of the Legendary Welsh Rock Band (2005)
- Keep on Crinting: The Liberty/UA Years Anthology (2006)

With The Tyla Gang

- Moonproof (1978)
- Just Popped Out (1980)

With Donovan's Brain

- Eclipse & Debris (1999)
- Tiny Crustacean Light Show (2000)

With The Green Ray

- Sighs, Wales and Trees (1995)
- The Green Ray (1996)
- Fragile World (2004)

With other artists

- Ernie Graham Ernie Graham (1971)
- Roger Ruskin Spear Unusual (1973)
- Deke Leonard Kamikaze (1974)
- Barry Melton Fish (1975)
- The Flying Aces Seashell (2002)
- Various Artists Naughty Rhythms: The Best of Pub Rock (1996)
