= Kingdom of Noise =

Studio album by Man
- Released: 9 June 2009
- Length: 41:31
- Label: United States Of Distribution LTD.
- Producer: Man

Man chronology
Diamonds and Coal (2006)	Kingdom of Noise (2009)	Reanimated Memories (2015)

Kingdom of Noise is a studio album by the Welsh rock band Man and was released 9 June 2009.

This is the second of studio releases not to feature any of the original members and the first to feature drummer Rene Robrahn.

== Track listing ==
1. "Shadow of the Hand" (Ace) – 5:53
2. "Steal the World" (Ace, Josh Ace) – 4:18
3. "Iceflowers" (Ace, Engel) – 4:46
4. "Russian Roulette" (Ace, Engel) – 7:04
5. "Kingdom of Noise" (Ace, Josh Ace) – 3:52
6. "Standing in the Rain" (Ace) – 4:47
7. "Speak" (Ace, Josh Ace) – 3:55
8. "Chuffin' Like a Muffin" (Ace, Engel) – 4:43
9. "Dissolve into Despair" (Ace, Josh Ace) – 4:13

== Personnel ==
- Josh Ace – guitar, vocals
- Allan Murdoch – guitar, engineer
- Phil Ryan – keyboards, producer
- Martin Ace – bass, vocals
- René Robrahn – drums
- Bob Richards – percussion, drums, background vocals

== Reception ==
Professional ratings
Review scores
Source	Rating
AllMusic	4/5 stars

AllMusic said although Kingdom of Noise had a different sound from previous albums, the album could become of their favourite albums by Man.
