= Phil Ryan (musician) =

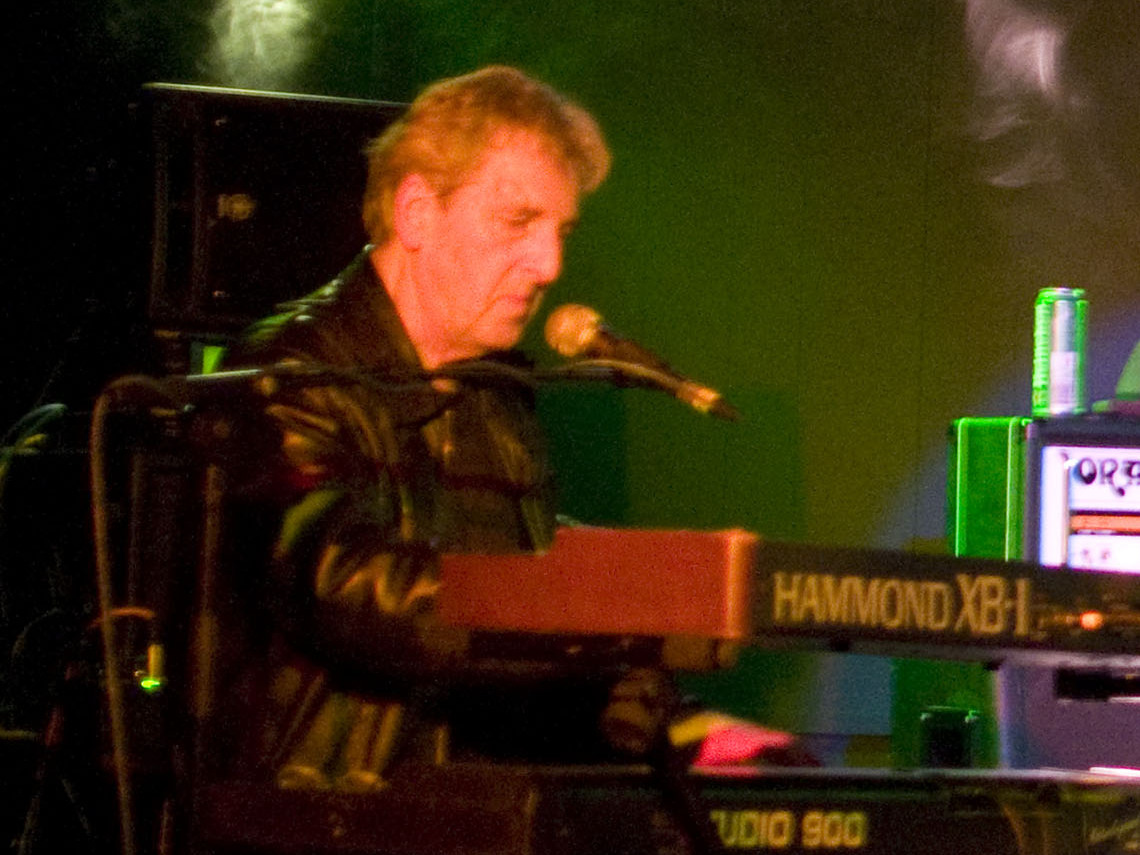
- Ryan in 2008

Background information
- Born: Philip Ryan; 21 October 1946; Port Talbot, Wales
- Died: 30 April 2016 (aged 69)
- Genres: Rock, psychedelic rock, progressive rock
- Occupations: Musician, composer
- Instruments: Keyboards, trombone
- Years active: 1964–2016

Phil Ryan (21 October 1946 – 30 April 2016) was a Welsh keyboardist and composer known for his work with Man and Pete Brown.

== Early career ==
Born in Port Talbot, Ryan played trombone in the National Youth Orchestra, but his rock career started in 1964 when he formed the Port Talbot/Neath band The Smokestacks, with John Hockin, Gary Pickford-Hopkins, Peter Randal and Gerald Trolley.

== Career ==
=== Eyes of Blue ===
In 1966 Ryan and Hopkins – together with the drummer John Weathers – joined The Eyes of Blue, who then turned professional. They won the 1966 Melody Maker Beat Contest, winning a one-year record contract, but had to record songs chosen for them, rather than their own material, and neither of their singles, "Heart Trouble" / "Up And Down" and "Supermarket Full of Cans" / "Don't Ask Me To Mend Your Broken Heart", sold well.

The Eyes moved from Decca to Mercury Records and recorded their first album Crossroads of Time in 1968, which was produced by Lou Reizner. The album included two tracks written by Graham Bond's wife Diane Stewart "Crossroads of Time" and "Love is the Law", who was a major influence on Ryan. Graham Bond also wrote the album sleeve notes. Despite poor sales, the album was "acknowledged as a major influence on the nascent Yes" Reizner then used The Eyes as the backing band for American singer-songwriter Buzzy Linhart's album Buzzy. They collaborated with Quincy Jones on the score of the movie Toy Grabbers, some tracks of which appear on their second album In Fields of Ardath (1969), and they also appeared in the movie Connecting Rooms.

Through producer Lou Reizner, Ryan began getting work as an arranger, and wrote the string arrangements on Caetano Veloso's third self-titled album called either his 1971 album or A Little More Blue.

The Eyes of Blue's third and final album, Bluebell Wood, was released under the pseudonym Big Sleep, and the band broke up shortly afterwards.

In 1970, Ryan and Weathers joined Pete Brown & Piblokto! playing on one single, "Flying Hero Sandwich" / "My Last Band". When bassist Steve Glover broke his wrist, he was replaced by Michael "Will" Youatt, and when Piblokto disbanded Ryan and Youatt, together with Clive John, who had just left Man, formed the first incarnation of Iorworth Pritchard and the Neutrons.

=== Man ===
In April 1972, Ryan and Youatt joined Man, Clive John re-joining at the same time. The band recorded Be Good to Yourself at Least Once a Day which received good reviews. A party on 19 December 1972, with Dave Edmunds, Help Yourself and others, was issued as Christmas at the Patti, a double 10" album, which topped the "budget" album chart. Man then recorded the double album Back into the Future, half in the studio, and half live at The Roundhouse. The album initially sold well, rising to No 23, and was tipped to be album that would make the band, but pressing was restricted by a lack of plastic during the 1973 oil crisis.

=== Neutrons ===
Ryan and Youatt left Man in 1973 to re-form the Neutrons. Andrew Lauder, head of A&R at United Artists put the duo in Rockfield Studios where they began recording the first Neutrons album, Black Hole Star. To record the album, Ryan and Youatt assembled several friends and former bandmates, including drummers John "Pugwash" Weathers (then with Gentle Giant) and Dave Charles; guitarists Martin Wallace and Ray "Taff" Williams, who had been in Eyes of Blue and Piblokto!, violinist Stuart Gordon (ex Incredible String Band) and vocalist Caromay Dixon.

The initial recordings were made at Rockfield Studios – "Snow Covered Eyes" and "Living In The World Today". The rest of the album was recorded in April 1974 at Chipping Norton Recording Studios. Released in September 1974 Black Hole Star featured Neutrons' logo, designed by Rick Griffin, whilst the track "Mermaid And Chips" features the lyrics of Pete Brown. The album spawned one single "Dance of the Psychedelic Lounge Lizard"/"Suzy and the Wonder Boy", The A-side being dedicated to Graham Bond, whilst the B side was not on the album, although it features Dave Edmunds on slide guitar.

The second album Tales From The Blue Cocoons was released in April 1975. The performers were similar to the first album, except Weathers was replaced by Stuart Halliday and Stuart Gordon did not play.

Ryan and Youatt were having musical differences, so, unlike the first album, none of the tracks on the second were jointly written by the pair, whilst the uncredited "Welsh R Blunt" dates from when Ryan was in Piblokto! and had also been played, but not recorded, by Man.

Neutrons toured to promote the album, but Taff Williams left shortly after the start of the tour, so former Help Yourself guitarist Richard Treece stood in, but Neutrons had disbanded by July 1975.

=== Man again ===
Ryan played on Clive John's solo album You Always Know Where You Stand With a Buzzard, and briefly started a solo project Road of Cobras, before rejoining Man in September 1975, along with bassist John McKenzie. One of the Road of Cobras tracks "Something is Happening" ended up on the next Man album The Welsh Connection which reached No 40 in the UK Album Chart. Towards the end of the US tour to promote the album, Man's manager, Barrie Marshall, announced that he would be discontinuing his role as the band's manager, and adopting all rights to the name Man. On the farewell tour of Europe, differences arose amongst the band who agreed to call it a day. The MCA record deal was for 3 albums, but MCA eventually agreed to a live farewell album, All's Well That Ends Well recorded at the Roundhouse on 11–13 December, although the final gig was in Slough on 16 December 1976.

=== Pete Brown ===
After Man's breakup, Ryan did the music for the BBC Play For To Day Red Shift, started working with Pete Brown again and also toured with Gallagher and Lyle, including a 1978 BBC "In Concert" session.

Ryan moved to Denmark in 1980, where he met and married the writer and director Bolette Bernild. Although now living in Denmark, Ryan continued a productive songwriting partnership with Pete Brown, producing two Ryan/Brown albums, Ardours of the Lost Rake and Coals to Jerusalem. They began touring in 1993, and a compilation of the two albums was issued on CD as The Land That Cream Forgot. Ryan worked as a musical director and composer for many of the top Danish Theaters, eventually becoming house composer for Comedievogen and the B&U department of Denmark's Radio (TV). His long association with Pete Brown produced two more albums, Road Of Cobras (2010) and Perils Of Wisdom (2014).

=== Man yet again ===
Ryan rejoined Man in 1996, playing on the albums 1998 at the Star Club (1998) and Endangered Species (2000), before leaving again in 2001, to look after his wife, who was terminally ill. Ryan rejoined Man in 2007, remaining with the 'core' band when it split in two in 2008 and playing on the albums Kingdom of Noise (2009) and Reanimated Memories (2015). Despite suffering three heart attacks and a stroke, he continued playing and remained in Man until his death in Denmark on 30 April 2016.

== Discography ==
With The Eyes of Blue

- Crossroads of Time (1968) (reissued on CD by Cherry Red in November 2015)
- In Fields of Ardath (1969)
- Bluebell Wood (1971) (issued under the pseudonym Big Sleep)

With Buzzy Linhart

- Buzzy (1969)

With Ancient Grease

- Women and Children First (1970)

With Pete Brown

- "Flying Hero Sandwich" / "My Last Band" Pete Brown & Piblokto!
- My Last Band (1977) Pete Brown & Piblokto
- Land That Cream Forgot (1996) Pete Brown & Phil Ryan
- Coals to Jerusalem (2003) Pete Brown & Phil Ryan
- Ardours of the Lost Rake (2003) Pete Brown & Phil Ryan
- Road of Cobras (2010) Pete Brown & Phil Ryan
- Perils of Wisdom (2014) Pete Brown & Phil Ryan

With John St. Field (Jackie Leven)

- Control (1971)

With Man

- Be Good to Yourself at Least Once a Day (1972)
- Christmas at the Patti (1973)
- Back into the Future (1973)
- The Welsh Connection (1976)
- All's Well That Ends Well (1977)
- Rare Man (1999)
- Live at the Rainbow 1972 (1999)
- 1998 at the Star Club (1999)
- Endangered Species (2000)
- Keep on Crinting: The Liberty/UA Years Anthology (2006)
- Live at the Keystone Berkeley, 9 August 1976 (2008)
- Kingdom of Noise (2009)
- Reanimated Memories (2015)

With Neutrons

- Black Hole Star (1974) (United Artists UAG 29652)
- Tales From the Blue Cocoons (1975) (United Artists UAG 29726) (reissued as a pair (BGOCD 598) in 2003)

With Clive John

- You Always Know Where You Stand with a Buzzard (1975)

With The Flying Aces

- Seashell (2002)
