= Michael Heatley =

British writer

Michael Heatley (born 29 October 1955) is the author or editor of over thirty biographies, including Backstreet Boys: The Unofficial Book, Bon Jovi: In Their Own Words and Rolf Harris: The Most Talented Man In The World. In 1995, he wrote the liner notes to Rolf's best-selling album Rolf Rules OK!

Since 1977 he has written more than a hundred music, sport and TV books.

He has written for magazines including Privileged View (for viewers of UK Gold and UK Living), 442 and Fultime (Fulham FC), Music Week, Billboard, Goldmine (US record collecting magazine), Radio Times, Daily Record and the Mail on Sunday colour supplement.

In addition, Michael runs a fanzine in honour of legendary Welsh psychedelic rock band Man called The Welsh Connection which is circulated to a small but fervent fanbase on a bi-monthly basis.

Michael Heatley co-wrote the Encyclopedia of Singles with Philip Dodd, Eithne Farry and Martin Noble.

== Selected bibliography ==
- Michael Heatley Rolf Harris: The Most Talented Man in the World , (Twisterella Books), (1997) ISBN 1-901483-01-0
- Michael Heatley The Immortal John Lennon, 1940-1980
- Michael Heatley The Complete Deep Purple
- Michael Heatley John Peel - A Life In Music
- Heatley, Michael (1997). Neil Young: in his own words. London, New York: Omnibus Press. ISBN 978-0-7119-6161-6. OCLC 38727767.
- Heatley, Michael (17 July 2009). Michael Jackson: Life of a Legend. Headline. p. 192. ISBN 978-0-7553-6053-6.
