= Back into the Future =

Studio album / Live album by Man
- Released: September 1973
- Recorded: May–July 1973, 24 June 1973
- Venue: Roundhouse (Side 3 & 4)
- Studio: Rockfield (Monmouth); Chipping Norton; Olympic (London) (Side 1 & 2)
- Length: 76:03
- Label: United Artists
- Producer: Man & Vic Maile

Man chronology
Be Good to Yourself at Least Once a Day (1972)	Back into the Future (1973)	Rhinos, Winos and Lunatics (1974)

Professional ratings
Review scores
Source	Rating
AllMusic	4.5/5.0 stars

Back into the Future is the seventh album by the Welsh rock band Man. Released in September 1973, it was the first Man album recorded following the departure of Clive John. Back into the Future was originally issued as a double LP. LP 1 was recorded at Rockfield Studios, Chipping Norton Recording Studios, and Olympic Studios in London between May and July 1973, initially by the remaining four band members, but they felt an additional guitarist was needed, so Wild Turkey guitarist Alan "Tweke" Lewis joined for the final studio recordings. Lewis also played on LP 2, which was recorded live by Pye Mobile at The Roundhouse in London on 24 June 1973.

The album spent three weeks in the UK album chart, peaking at No 23, the highest album chart position of any Man album.

== Track listing ==
LP 1, Side one
No.	Title	Writer(s)	Length
1.	"A Night in Dad's Bag"	Michael Jones, Phil Ryan, Terry Williams	4:04
2.	"Just for You"	Jones, Ryan, Williams	5:13
3.	"Back into the Future"	Jones, Ryan, Williams	4:06
4.	"Don't Go Away"	Jones, Ryan, Williams	4:00

LP 1, Side two
No.	Title	Writer(s)	Length
1.	"Ain't Their Fight"	Jones, Ryan, Williams	7:40
2.	"Never Say Nups to Nepalese"	Jones, Ryan, Williams	7:32

LP 2, Side three
No.	Title	Writer(s)	Length
1.	"Sospan Fach"	trad. arranged by Gwalia Male Choir	3:33
2.	"C'mon"	Clive John, Jones, Ryan, Williams	19:02

LP 2, Side four
No.	Title	Writer(s)	Length
1.	"Jam Up Jelly Tight / Oh No Not Again (Spunk Rock '73)"	Jones, Ryan, Williams	21:04

== Personnel ==
=== Side one ===
- Michael "Micky" Jones – guitar, vocals
- Phil Ryan – keyboards, vocals
- Will Youatt – bass, vocals
- Terry Williams – drums, vocals

=== Side two, three & four ===
- Michael "Micky" Jones – guitar, vocals
- Alan "Tweke" Lewis – guitar
- Phil Ryan – keyboards, vocals
- Will Youatt – bass, vocals
- Terry Williams – drums, vocals

=== Credits ===
- Engineering – Anthony Matthews
- Front photography – Ruan O'Laughran
- Art direction and photography inside – Pierre Tubbs
