= Help Yourself (band) =

Early 1970s English rock band

- Origin: London, England
- Genres: Pub rock, country rock, psychedelic rock
- Years active: 1970–1973, 2002–2003
- Labels: Liberty, United Artists, Hux
- Past members: Malcolm Morley; Richard Treece; Dave Charles; Ken Whaley; Paul Burton; Ernie Graham; Jonathan "Jo Jo" Glemser; Sean Tyla; Deke Leonard; Kevin Spacey

Help Yourself, known to their fans as "The Helps", were an English rock band of the early 1970s. Originally formed as a backing band for Malcolm Morley, they evolved into a pub rock band with psychedelic-influences. Releasing four studio albums before their break-up, and one 31 years later, they are possibly best known for the number of notable musicians that passed through their ranks.

== History ==
Help Yourself formed in London in 1970, originally as a backing band for singer-songwriter Malcolm Morley, who had been signed as a solo act by Famepushers. The band was assembled by John Eichler who, as well as working for Famepushers, was production manager at Strand Cosmetics, where he hired people either for 'musical ability' or 'strangeness'.

The eponymous debut album, Help Yourself, was recorded from late 1970 to early 1971. Malcolm Morley (vocals, guitars, keyboards) wrote all the songs on this album, which was recorded with former Sam Apple Pie member Dave Charles (drums, percussion, vocals), ex member of Monday Morning Glory Band, Richard Treece (lead guitar, harmonica, vocals) and former Growth member Ken Whaley (bass).

The album was recorded before the band had played a gig, having been signed to Liberty Records by Andrew Lauder, head of A&R. The band toured on the Downhome Rhythm Kings package with Brinsley Schwarz & Ernie Graham (ex Eire Apparent), who were all managed by Famepushers. After the tour, Ken Whaley departed but no other bass player was recruited to replace him.

Help Yourself, Ernie Graham (vocals, guitar) and his guitarist Jonathan "Jojo" Glemser, moved into Headley Grange in 1971, shortly after Led Zeppelin IV had been recorded there. The line-up was amalgamated to include both Graham (who had just released his eponymous solo album backed by Help Yourself and Brinsley Schwarz) and Glemser, both of whom were guitarists, so Treece switched to bass. The band played the 1971 Glastonbury Festival. "Street Songs", from their first album, was issued on a United Artists double album sampler All Good Clean Fun. A tour was arranged to promote this album, so Help Yourself joined Man and Leicester band Gypsy, on a tour of Switzerland. The second album Strange Affair was recorded at Rockfield Studios, initially with Richard Treece still on bass, and adding his guitar parts later, until Paul Burton, their then Road Manager and former Sam Apple Pie roadie, joined on bass, guitar and vocals, to complete the album. Strange Affair was released in early 1972, by which time both Graham and Glemser had also departed.

The new line-up of Morley, Treece, Charles and Burton appeared on their first Peel Session in April 1972 and recorded the next album Beware The Shadow almost immediately. Sean Tyla, who had been the band's roadie, helped with some of the songwriting during this period, notably "American Mother," and "All Electric Fur Trapper" on "Strange Affair" which was based on a fairy tale he had written. Shortly after completing the album, the band left Headley Grange, Tyla moved in with ex member Ken Whaley, and they formed Ducks Deluxe.

Just as the Helps were due to start a tour to promote Beware The Shadow, Morley suffered a bout of depression ("The Shadow" referred to in the album title). Rather than cancel the tour, Deke Leonard, who had just been fired by Man, stood in. Leonard stayed with the band after Morley had recovered, whilst Help Yourself backed Leonard on his first solo album Iceberg

In December 1972, Help Yourself with Leonard and B. J. Cole, played at Man's Christmas Party. The double 10" album, Christmas at the Patti recorded at this concert, contains far more of their performance (24’) than their hosts (11’30’’). Ducks Deluxe also played this concert, but Whaley had already left.

Beware The Shadow was released in late 1972, but none of the first three albums sold well. The Helps appealed to a hippie audience such as fans of Grateful Dead and Quicksilver Messenger Service so they were moderately successful in the U.S. but never toured there.

In 1973, the band proposed touring with Roger Ruskin Spear, the Flying Aces and Vivian "Spiv" Morris, in a vaudeville show called "Happy Days", which was to be held in a circus tent. They started recording material for this in January, but Burton was unhappy with the proposed theatrical tour, so he left. Whaley returned and the band started recording their new album in February, finishing the Happy Days album in March and the Helps album in April, when they also recorded their second Peel Session. After a two-month "Happy Days" tour, the fourth album, The Return of Ken Whaley, was released, with the Happy Days album included free with the first 5,000 copies.

The fourth album did not sell well either, and the band were not getting many gigs, so they were surprised when United Artists asked them to record another album, which they started recording in July 1973, with a line-up augmented by Sean Tyla. The album was to be called 5 and a cover was commissioned from Rick Griffin. They only had "half formed ideas" and although they eventually laid down 8 tracks, they gave up recording and disbanded in August 1973. They re-formed for "The Amazing ZigZag Concert" on 28 April 1974 with a core line-up of Morley, Treece, Whaley and Charles with Burton and Leonard guesting.

Being incomplete, 5 was not issued, although a few years later some fans tried, unsuccessfully, to persuade the band to complete the album. After Morley released his solo album Aliens in 2001, the suggestion re-arose, and the album was finally completed in 2002/2003 by Morley, Treece and Whaley, with Kevin Spacey on drums, as Charles had other commitments. The album was eventually released in 2004.

== Musical style ==
Help Yourself played pub rock with a psychedelic-influenced sound. Ned Raggett of AllMusic wrote, "Call the band a more down-to-earth Pink Floyd or Hawkwind set somewhere in the English countryside without specifically owing anything to either band." Dave Thompson of AllMusic said that "familial comparisons to Man notwithstanding, [Help Yourself] was always closer to the British pub rock ideal than many of the movement's better-feted icons ever could be. Raggett described Help Yourself as "a bar band for those who liked to spend their days baking in the sun".

== Personnel ==
- Malcolm Morley – keyboards, guitar, vocals (1970–1973 & 2002–2003)
- Richard Treece – guitar, bass, vocals (1970–1973 & 2002–2003)
- Dave Charles – drums, percussion, vocals (1970–1973)
- Ken Whaley – bass (1970–1971, 1973 & 2002–2003)
- Paul Burton – bass, guitar, vocals (1971–1973)
- Jonathan "Jojo" Glemser – guitar (1971)
- Ernie Graham – guitar, vocals (1971)
- Sean Tyla – guitar, vocals (1972 & 1973)
- Deke Leonard - guitar (1972)
- Kevin Spacey – drums (2002–2003)

== Subsequent careers ==
=== Richard Treece ===
Richard Treece briefly joined Deke Leonard's Iceberg and later re-joined George and Martin Ace in The Flying Aces. He briefly joined The Splendid Humans, before joining former Man members Phil Ryan and Will Youatt in The Neutrons. In 2000, he issued a solo album, Dream Arena East (Treece 1), and then joined Ken Whaley in 'The Archers', which evolved into 'The Green Ray'.

The Green Ray comprised Richard Treece (guitar and vocals), Ken Whaley (bass and Vocals), his brother Simon Whaley (drums) and Simon Haspeck (guitar and vocals). They issued three albums: Soft Cloud (2002) SC001/FYPC15, Back from the Edge (2006) Gray 11 with Aaron Liddard, and the live Classic Rock Club, Cheshunt, 5 January 2008 with Nick Saloman of The Bevis Frond (Effigy 2008), and a DVD with Barry "The Fish" Melton guesting. They played at the Glastonbury Festival (Green Stage) in 2007. Treece died on 26 May 2015.

=== Paul Burton ===
Paul Burton joined Deke Leonard's Iceberg after playing on the first album. He toured Republic of Ireland with them. He left after that tour and worked for Manticore Records (Emerson, Lake & Palmer), running their rehearsal studio in Fulham Broadway. He worked as a tour manager for Baker Gurvitz Army (Ginger Baker, Paul and Adrian Gurvitz) until January 1975. Having been newly married, he took a job as a chauffeur and ended up running a UK subsidiary of a Swiss electronics company as managing director for more than 25 years. He retired in 2007 and lived in Devon with his second wife. Burton died on 12 July 2023.

== Discography ==
=== Albums ===
- Help Yourself (1971) Liberty ((UK Cat No) LBS 83484)) ((US Cat No) LBS 5583) Allmusic
- Strange Affair (1972) United Artists ((UK Cat No) UAS 29287) ((US Cat No) UAS 5591) Allmusic
- Beware The Shadow (1972) United Artists (UAS 29413) Allmusic
- The Return of Ken Whaley (1973) United Artists (UAS 29487) Allmusic
- Happy Days (with the Flying Aces and Spiv) (1973) United Artists (UA Free 1) free with the first 5,000 copies of The Return of Ken Whaley as a box set (UDG4001)
- 5 (8 unreleased 1973 recordings & 3 recorded in 2002/2003) (2004) Hux Records (HUX054)

=== Live albums ===
- Christmas at the Patti (with Man, Ducks Deluxe, Flying Aces and others) (1973) United Artists (UDX 203/4): CD Re-release (1997) Point (PNTVP110CD): CD Re-master (2007) Esoteric (ECLEC 2018) Allmusic
- The Amazing ZigZag Concert (2010) Road Goes on Forever (RGF/ZZBOX1974) Disc 4 of 5-CD Box set also featuring Starry Eyed and Laughing, Chilli Willi and the Red Hot Peppers, John Stewart and Michael Nesmith

=== Singles ===
- "Running Down Deep" / "Paper Leaves" (1971) Liberty (LBF15459)
- "Heaven Row" / "Brown Lady" (1972) United Artists (UP 35355)
- "Mommy Won’t Be Home for Christmas" / "Johnny B. Goode" (1972) United Artists (UP 35466)

=== Compilations ===
- Strange Affair and Beware The Shadow (the second and third albums), were re-released on one double LP (UA 29796/97 XB) in 1997 in Germany as part of the series The Classic British Rock Scene
- Help Yourself and Beware The Shadow (the first and third albums), were re-released on one CD (BGO CD 385) in 1998
- Strange Affair, The Return of Ken Whaley and Happy Days were re-released on a double CD (BGO CD452) in 1999 Allmusic
- Reaffirmation, "An anthology 1971-73" Remastered, selected tracks from the first 4 albums, Happy Days & Christmas at the Patti, plus the Christmas single - (Esoteric ECLEC 22459) 2014
- Passing Through, "The Complete Studio Recordings" Remastered, including the first 4 albums, Happy Days & Christmas at the Patti live tracks, plus the Christmas single, the single version of Heaven Row, a previously unreleased BBC Bob Harris session, an unreleased 1972 demo and Malcolm Morley's solo album Lost and Found - (Esoteric QECLEC 62766) 2021

=== Samplers ===
- All Good Clean Fun One track ("Street Songs") appears on the original 1971 double album (UDX 201/2)
- All Good Clean Fun Three tracks ("Street Songs", "Eddie Waring" and "Re-affirmation") appear on the 2004 triple CD re-release (Liberty 8660902)
- Naughty Rhythms: The Best of Pub Rock Includes one Helps track "Alabama Lady" (1996) EMI Premier (37968)
