= Man (band) =

Welsh rock band

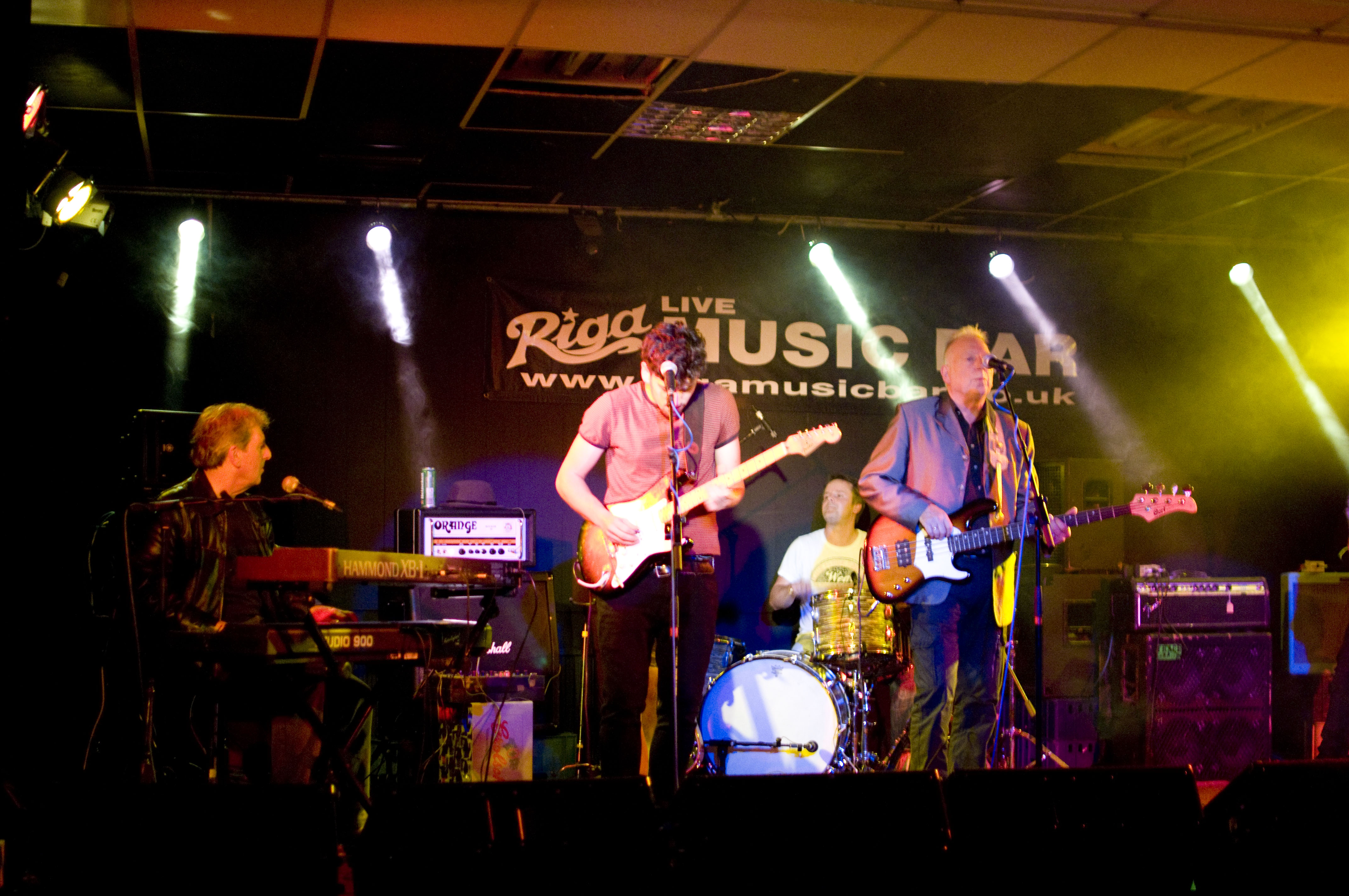
- Man in 2009

Background information
- Origin: Merthyr Tydfil, Wales
- Genres: Progressive rock; psychedelic rock; jam band; space rock
- Years active: 1968–1976; 1983–present
- Members: Martin Ace; Josh Ace; James Beck; Shane Dixon; Malcolm Morley
- Past members: Micky Jones; Deke Leonard; Clive John; Ray Williams; Jeff Jones; Terry Williams; Phil Ryan; Will Youatt; Alan "Tweke" Lewis; Ken Whaley; John Cipollina; John McKenzie; John Weathers; Rick Martinez; Bob Richards; Gareth Llewellyn Thorrington; George Jones; Rene Robrahn
- Website: manband.co.uk

Man (also known as The Manband) are a Welsh rock band. The group were formed in November 1968 by Micky Jones (guitar and vocals), Deke Leonard (guitar and vocals), Clive John (guitar, keyboards and vocals), Ray Williams (bass guitar) and Jeff Jones (drums), in Merthyr Tydfil, out of previous local band the Bystanders. They were active through to 1976 with an ever-changing personnel, the last line-up consisting of Jones and Leonard with John McKenzie (bass), Terry Williams (drums) and Phil Ryan (keyboards). Amongst others, Martin Ace (guitar and bass) had a significant spell with group.

They released nine studio albums, including the UK charting albums Back into the Future (No. 23), Rhinos, Winos and Lunatics (No. 24) and the live album Maximum Darkness (No. 25). Their musical style is rock encompassing elements of psychedelia and progressive, and they are noted for their extended live improvisations.

The group reformed in 1983 with Jones, Leonard and Ace being joined by new drummer John Weathers. The band remains active, with Ace being the only ever-present member after further personnel changes. They have released a further eight studio albums.

== The Bystanders ==
Man evolved out of the Bystanders, a successful close harmony pop group from Merthyr Tydfil who played in numerous club residencies in Wales, often playing at several clubs a night. The Bystanders issued eight singles, including "98.6" (No. 45 in UK Singles Chart in February 1967) which was played in the 2009 film The Boat That Rocked (although Keith's version was the bigger hit, reaching No. 24 in the UK) and "When Jesamine Goes", written by their manager Ronnie Scott and Marty Wilde under the pseudonyms of Frere Manston and Jack Gellar, which was later covered by the Casuals as "Jesamine" and got to No. 2 on the UK chart. They also recorded sessions of cover versions for the BBC, as rules restricting needle time required "live" performances between the records during the 1960s; they became regulars on the Jimmy Young Show, the David Symonds Show and others.

When formed in 1962, the Bystanders included Owen Money, then known as Gerry Braden, but he was replaced by Vic Oakley, giving the classic line-up of Vic Oakley (vocals), Micky Jones (guitar), Clive John a.k.a. Clint Space (keyboards), Ray Williams (bass guitar) and Jeff Jones (drums). By 1968, the other members wanted to change musical direction to a more psychedelic/American west-coast guitar sound, so Oakley left, to be replaced by Deke Leonard, and the band changed its name to Man.

== Pye years ==
Man were initially signed to Pye Records, for which they recorded their first two albums with John Schroeder producing: Revelation (January 1969), noted for the simulated orgasm on "Erotica", which received a UK ban, and 2 Ozs of Plastic with a Hole in the Middle (September 1969). While mixing the second album, Leonard left and was replaced by Martin Ace from Leonard's previous band, Dream. At this time, Man were recording three demo sessions a week for Leeds Music, including "Down the Dustpipe", which was taught to Status Quo.

Man then toured Europe, predominantly Germany, supporting Chicago, but on the band's return, they were stopped as suspected terrorists, then jailed for drugs offences in Belgium. Leonard then rejoined, but Ace stayed on as a multi-instrumentalist. Shortly after, the bass guitarist Ray Williams and the drummer Jeff Jones were fired, with Terry Williams joining on drums and Ace moving to bass guitar. Leonard, Ace and Terry Williams having been together in Dream, this was seen by some as a take-over.

A bootleg of the first gig by this line-up, in October 1970 in Hamburg, was issued as To Live for to Die (recorded 1970, CD issued as The Honest One in 1992 and 1997) and was later re-bootlegged by the band. Despite good reviews in Britain, Two Ounces of Plastic ... was more popular in Germany, so the band spent a year in Germany, where, having to play 4–5 hours a night, most numbers became extended jams.

== United Artists years ==
The band's manager, Barrie Marshall, obtained a new record contract with Andrew Lauder of United Artists Records, for whom the band recorded the album Man (March 1971), which received mixed reviews. The band's media break came when outperforming Soft Machine, Yes and Family at a concert in Berlin, but Man continued to play on the continent. Having appeared on the United Artists double sampler album All Good Clean Fun (1971), Man undertook a tour of Switzerland to promote the album, with Help Yourself and the Leicester band Gypsy.

The next album, Do You Like It Here Now, Are You Settling In? (November 1971), recorded at Rockfield Studios by Kingsley Ward, received good reviews, and the band appeared on German TV and in Iceland with Badfinger. Constant touring was creating internal pressures and, in January 1972, the keyboard player Clive John left the band to form Iowerth Pritchard and the Neutrons with Phil Ryan and Will Youatt (1950-2017).

The new four-piece supported Hawkwind and Brinsley Schwarz at a charity gig at The Roundhouse on 13 February 1972, recorded and issued as Greasy Truckers Party (with other artists, April 1972), a limited-edition double album which rapidly became a collector's item. United Artists' A&R man, Andrew Lauder, persuaded them to follow this with a live album. Live at the Padget Rooms, Penarth was recorded on 8 April 1972. It was sold at a reduced price and only 8,000 copies were pressed, which sold out in a week, making it No 1 in the "budget" album chart.

The band then tried to write a new studio album, but lacked inspiration. Ace left, to form The Flying Aces, with his wife George, so Micky Jones and Terry Williams sacked Leonard, and Clive John rejoined with his new band members, Ryan (keyboards) and Youatt (bass guitar). The new band recorded the first of Man's three Peel Sessions on 29 August 1972, (the others being on 18 September 1973 and 31 October 1974). Man then recorded Be Good to Yourself at Least Once a Day (November 1972), which received good reviews. A party on 19 December 1972, with Dave Edmunds, Help Yourself, The Flying Aces and others, was issued as Christmas at the Patti (July 1973), a double 10" album, which again topped the "budget" album chart, but on tour Clive John fell out with Micky Jones and left again.

The four-piece started to record Back into the Future (September 1973), but felt the need for a second guitarist, so Alan "Tweke" Lewis joined from Wild Turkey. On 24 June 1973 they recorded the live half of this double album at Man's spiritual London home, The Roundhouse, backed by the Gwalia Male Choir, who had previously sung with Man at The Oval, when they supported Frank Zappa. The album initially sold well, rising to No 23, and again, this was tipped to be the album that would make the band, but pressing was restricted by a lack of plastic during the oil crisis. The follow-up tour had Deke Leonard's Iceberg as support. During the tour, Micky Jones and Leonard discussed a new Man line-up, so when Ryan and Youatt left to form The Neutrons in December 1973, Leonard disbanded Iceberg and rejoined Man along with two former members of Help Yourself: Malcolm Morley (keyboards) and Ken Whaley (bass guitar), who had also played in Iceberg.

The next album, Rhinos, Winos and Lunatics (May 1974), was produced by Roy Thomas Baker, noted for his work with Queen, and spent four weeks in the UK album chart, peaking at No 24. In March/April 1974, Man supported Hawkwind on The 1999 Party, a five-week US tour. At the Los Angeles Whisky a Go Go on 12 March, Jim Horn joined on saxophone, which was included as a bonus disc with the reissue of Rhinos, Winos and Lunatics in 2007. The 21 April gig in Chicago was recorded for radio and issued on CD in 1997 as The 1999 Party Tour, but omits Morley from the credits, although he is on the recording.

Morley left the day before recording started on the next album, Slow Motion (October 1974). Before the album was released, the band toured the UK (again with Badfinger) and USA in August–October 1974, and returned to the US in March 1975, to promote the album by touring with REO Speedwagon and New Riders of the Purple Sage, but the tour collapsed on the first night. A new US tour, with REO Speedwagon and Blue Öyster Cult broke up two-thirds of the way through. Additional dates were arranged, but most were cancelled when Micky Jones developed pneumonia, so the final gigs were at the San Francisco Winterland. These were a great success, and the promoter Bill Graham paid them a bonus, and rebooked them, but Whaley had had enough and left.

Ace flew out as a stand in and the band met and rehearsed with John Cipollina of Quicksilver Messenger Service, who played with them at Winterland and agreed to play a UK tour. On this tour, the Roundhouse gig was recorded for commercial release and, although Buckley and Ellingham said that it is rumoured that Micky Jones had to over-dub Cipollina's guitar, it was only the track "Bananas" on which his playing was replaced: "Everything on Maximum Darkness which sounds like Cipollina is Cipollina", per Deke Leonard. The album Maximum Darkness (September 1975) reached no 25 in the UK album chart and Ace continued as a "stand in" bass guitarist until the end of a French tour, with Hawkwind, Gong and Magma, when he returned to the Flying Aces.

== MCA ==
The band changed label to MCA Records, Phil Ryan rejoined on keyboards, but as no bass players they knew were available, the band had to audition for the first time in their history. Auditions went badly, until the final audition, of John McKenzie of Global Village Trucking Company, who was immediately offered the job. They then recorded The Welsh Connection (March 1976) which reached No 40 in the UK Album Chart and was toured in March/April 1976 in Britain and June/July in the US. During the US tour differences arose again, and on the subsequent European tour keyboardist Phil Ryan and bassist John McKenzie announced they would be leaving, and the rest of the band agreed to call it a day. The MCA record deal, however, was for three albums, but nobody was willing to contribute new material, and their attempts at covers were poor, so MCA eventually agreed to a live farewell album. All's Well That Ends Well (November 1977) was recorded at the Roundhouse on 11–13 December, although the final gig was in Slough on 16 December 1976. The band agreed that they "would never, ever, be one of those bands who reformed in a futile attempt to recapture past glories ...".

== Interval ==
After the 1976 break up, band members undertook numerous projects, often with other former members.

=== Martin Ace ===
Bassist/guitarist Martin Ace left Man before The Welsh Connection to reform The Flying Aces with his wife George (guitar), Mickey Gee (guitar), Phil Ryan (keyboards) and Stuart Halliday (drums). Ryan returned to Man and Halliday joined Alkatraz, being replaced first by Dave Charles (ex–Help Yourself) and then Mike Gibbins (ex-Badfinger).

In the 1980s Ace and Micky Jones occasionally backed Welsh Elvis impersonator Peter Singh in The Screaming Pakistanis, and Ace also played with guitarist David Tipton with John 'Pugwash' Weathers (ex–Gentle Giant) on drums.

=== Micky Jones ===
Shortly after the break-up, guitarist Micky Jones recorded some demos with John McKenzie (bass), Malcolm Morley (guitar & keyboards) and Derek Ballard (drums). In 1978 he formed the Micky Jones Band, with Tweke Lewis (guitar), Steve Dixon (drums), Al McLaine (bass) and Steve Gurl (ex–Wild Turkey and Babe Ruth) (keyboards).

Lewis and Gurl left, so Jones, Dixon and McLaine continued as three-piece Manipulator, occasionally known as The Acidtones. In 1981 Jones disbanded Manipulator and formed The Flying Pigs with Mick Hawksworth (bass) and Phil Little (drums).

=== Deke Leonard ===
Guitarist Deke Leonard reformed Iceberg, with Lincoln Carr (bass) and Terry Williams (when not playing with Rockpile). He still had a record contract and initially recorded with Martin Ace and Terry Williams, but needed two attempts to complete the album Before Your Very Eyes (1979), release of which was delayed for five years, when EMI took over United Artists. A later line-up included two musicians Leonard had played with in Help Yourself: Richard Treece (guitar & bass) and B.J. Cole (pedal steel guitar), plus Reg Isadore (drums). Leonard took up writing, and briefly moved to the US, where he worked on a Walter Egan album.

Leonard formed The Force with Sean Tyla (ex–Ducks Deluxe) (guitar), Micky Groome (bass) and Paul Simmons (drums). Their album Force's First (1982) also included Terry Williams and Martin Ace. The Force disbanded after Tyla suffered severe stage fright in 1982, and Leonard reformed the band as another Iceberg.

=== John McKenzie ===
Bassist John McKenzie initially joined Ryan and Pete Brown, before joining Steve Hillage appearing on some tracks of the Live Herald (1979) album. He then became a session/backing musician, touring with Dr John, Albert Lee, Davy Spillane, the Christians, Seal, Alison Moyet and Everything but the Girl and recording with Bob Dylan, the Pretenders, Eurythmics, David Bowie, Mary Coughlan, Paul Brady, Moya Brennan, Andrea Corr, Damien Rice, and Wham!

=== Phil Ryan ===
Keyboardist Phil Ryan rejoined his former Piblokto partner Pete Brown and briefly formed the Brown & Ryan Band with McKenzie (bass), Taff Williams (ex-Neutrons) (guitar) and Steve Jones (drums). A second line-up of Pete Brown, Phil Ryan, Taff Williams, Dill Katz (bass) and Jeff Seopardie (drums) known as both 'Pete Brown and the Interoceters' and 'Ray Gammond and the Interoceters' recorded some tracks issued on Pete Brown's 1984 album Party in the Rain. He also played a few gigs with the Flying Aces.

Ryan then moved to Denmark, where his wife Bolette came from, and wrote music for films and TV. He died in April 2016.

=== Terry Williams ===
On the breakup of Man, drummer Terry Williams immediately joined Rockpile with Dave Edmunds, Nick Lowe and Billy Bremner. They continued until 1981, issuing several successful albums & singles and touring the US and Europe. Williams then briefly worked with Meat Loaf, before receiving an offer to join Dire Straits in 1982, with whom he was still working when Man reformed. He left Dire Straits in 1988.

== Reformed ==
The band reformed in 1983, with a line-up of Micky Jones and Deke Leonard on guitars, Martin Ace on bass and John "Pugwash" Weathers (formerly of Gentle Giant) on drums. This line-up was to stay constant until 1996, except from a short spell, when Weathers was unwell, and Rick Martinez temporarily took over.

After rehearsals, their first gig was on All Fools Day at the Marquee Club in London, and in June 1983 they recorded Friday 13th (January 1984, Picasso PIK 001) at The Marquee, but this comprised old numbers, not new material. Not having a recording contract to promote them, albums were issued on several labels, e.g. Friday 13th was also issued as Live at the Marquee (Great Expectations PIPCD 055) and Talk about a Morning (Dressed to Kill DRESS 600). Later that year, they played the Reading Festival, which was recorded for Tommy Vance's Friday Rock Show and released as Live at Reading '83 in 1993.

In 1983, they also recorded an album of new material in Germany, but fell out with the producer, who was also the album's promoter, so the album was never issued. The first studio album to be issued, The Twang Dynasty, was issued in 1992 and included the track "Fast and Dangerous", which was used on trailers for Paul Whitehouse's Fast Show, although the band were not paid for this.

Their performance at 1994's Glastonbury Festival was issued as Live 1994 - Official Bootleg (and reissued as Live Official Bootleg), and in 1995 they recorded Call Down the Moon (May 1995) issued on the Hypertension label, and produced by the band and Ron Sanchez – a US musician and DJ, who had long championed their cause.

Weathers left in 1996, allegedly because Gentle Giant were about to reform, and was replaced by returning drummer Terry Williams, who in the interim, had served in bands such as Dire Straits. Williams recorded some tracks, later released on the Undrugged (May 2002) album, and then Leonard suffered a minor stroke, so the band played a few gigs as a three-piece. When Leonard returned in 1997, Williams left, to be replaced by drummer Bob Richards, formerly of The Wild Family and The Adrian Smith Band.

Former keyboardist Phil Ryan returned in 1998, taking the band back to the classic five-piece line-up, which recorded a live double album 1998 at the Star Club (1998) at The Star Club, Oberhausen, Germany, in March that year. Ryan played a major role in producing Endangered Species (June 2000), but then had to withdraw from the band for personal reasons. Ryan was replaced by Gareth Llewellyn Thorrington, who missed the recording of Down Town Live (2002) at the Down Town Blues Club, Hamburg, in May 2001, as his flight was cancelled due a bomb scare, but appeared on part of the Undrugged (May 2002) album (an "unplugged" album with a twist in the title), which had been started in 1996, and was finally issued in 2002. Undrugged has some classic covers, including "Sail on, Sailor" by the Beach Boys and Ray Charles's "Georgia on My Mind", both lead vocals being by Micky Jones.

In 2002, Micky Jones was diagnosed with a brain tumour and had to take time off for treatment. Jones's place was temporarily taken by his son George Jones, but when Micky had recovered enough to rejoin, in 2004, Leonard decided to leave, again, so George became a permanent member of the band. In 2005, Micky Jones' health deteriorated due to the re-occurrence of his brain tumour and he was replaced by Martin Ace's son Josh Ace.

In November 2006, the album Diamonds and Coal was released, after which Thorrington was sacked, and the band continued as a four-piece. The 40th anniversary tour in 2008 saw the return of Ryan on keyboards, giving a multi-generational line-up, with two early members (bassist Martin Ace and keyboardist Phil Ryan), two sons of early members (guitarists George Jones and Josh Ace) and drummer Bob Richards, who had been in the band since 1997. This line-up also recorded a studio album, but before it was mixed, the band split. Josh Ace, Martin Ace and Phil Ryan recruited James Beck (guitar, vocals) and Rene Robrahn (drums, vocals) to the new line-up and wiped parts of the album to replace George Jones. Bob Richards's parts were kept on as they were unable to record over them, due to the lack of a click track. This album, Kingdom of Noise, was finally released in June 2009.

George Jones and Bob Richards formed a new band, Son of Man, with Richie Galloni (vocals), Marco James (keyboards) and Ray Jones (bass) from Welsh band Sassafras and Glenn Quinn (guitar) from Tigertailz. As of 2020 they are continuing to play Man's music at gigs around England and Wales, having released Son of Man, an album of new material in October 2016. Their second album, State Of Dystopia, was released in March 2020.

A new album, Reanimated Memories, was launched at a gig at The Half Moon, Putney, on 22 February 2015, the band's first performance in the UK since October 2011.

In 2015 Swansea Museum mounted an exhibition, The Evolution of Man 1965-2014, Acid Rock from Wales, displaying Man memorabilia from the last 50 years, from the collection of local fan John Bannon.

Since 2011 Man have been based in Germany, where they still perform occasionally, including autumn tours in 2012 and 2013, and a short UK tour in 2019.

For their 50th anniversary tour in 2018, Shane Dixon joined the band as the new drummer and Malcolm Morley returned to play keyboards. Their latest album, Anachronism Tango, was released in October 2019.

== Deaths ==
After leaving Man, Micky Jones continued to perform for a while, but was then diagnosed with another tumour; he spent the next year and a half in and out of hospital; his health meant he remained at a care home in Swansea for the next three years until he died peacefully, at the age of 63, on 10 March 2010.

Clive John, AKA Clint Space, died after a long fight against emphysema on 24 August 2011 in Hanover Street, Swansea, aged 66.

Ken Whaley died from lung cancer on 8 May 2013, aged 66.

Phil Ryan remained in the band until his death on 30 April 2016, aged 69.

Deke Leonard died on 31 January 2017 at the age of 72.

Will Youatt died peacefully in his sleep on 13 September 2017.

John McKenzie died on 10 May 2020 at the age of 64.

== Musical style ==
Man's style combined elements of psychedelia, space rock and progressive music. With their debut album, Revelation, Man "positioned themselves between the space prog of Nektar and the acid-fried rock of Quicksilver Messenger Service". According to AllMusic, "Man were one of the most promising rock bands to come out of Wales in the early '70s. Along with Brinsley Schwarz, they helped establish the core of the pub rock sound, but they played louder and also had a progressive component to their work that separated them from many of their rivals." Member Martin Ace has denied that Man are a pub rock band, saying, "We ended up playing in pubs, but it would be completely false to lump us in with that scene. Dire Straits were a pub rock band, not us. Terry [Williams, a former member of Man] went on to join Rockpile, who were the definitive pub rock band, but we sounded nothing like them." The BBC called Man a progressive rock band and "psych-prog titans". Classic Rock magazine called Man a jam band. Frank Zappa was an admirer of Man's music, and once described Man guitarist Micky Jones as "one of the 10 best guitarists in the world".

== Members ==
=== Current members ===
- Martin Ace – bass, vocals, guitar (1969–1972, 1975, 1983–present)
- Malcolm Morley – keyboards, guitar, vocals (1974, 2018–present)
- Josh Ace – rhythm guitar, vocals, keyboards (2005–present)
- James Beck – lead guitar (2009–present)
- Shane Dixon – drums (2018–present)

=== Former members ===
- Micky Jones – lead guitar, vocals (1968–1976, 1983–2002, 2004–2005; died 2010)
- Clive John – keyboards, guitar, vocals (1968–1972, 1972–1973; died 2011)
- Jeff Jones – drums (1968–1970)
- Ray Williams – bass, vocals (1968–1970)
- Deke Leonard – guitar, keyboards, percussion, vocals (1968–1969, 1970–1972, 1974–1976, 1983–1996, 1997–2004; died 2017)
- Terry Williams – drums, vocals (1970–1976, 1987–1988, 1990, 1996–1997)
- Phil Ryan – keyboards, vocals (1972–1973, 1975–1976, 1996–2000, 2008–2016; his death)
- Will Youatt – bass, vocals (1972–1973; died 2017)
- Tweke Lewis – guitar (1973)
- Ken Whaley – bass (1974–1975; died 2013)
- John Cipollina – lead guitar (guest 1975; died 1989)
- John McKenzie – bass, vocals (1975–1976; died 2020)
- John "Pugwash" Weathers – drums, vocals, guitar (1983–1986, 1988–1989, 1990–1995)
- Rick Martinez – drums (1990)
- Bob Richards – drums, percussion, backing vocals (1997–2008)
- Gareth Thorrington – keyboards (2000–2006)
- George Jones – guitar, vocals (2002–2008)
- Rene Robrahn – drums (2009–2018)

== Discography ==
- Revelation (1969)
- 2 Ozs of Plastic with a Hole in the Middle (1969)
- Man (1971)
- Do You Like It Here Now, Are You Settling In? (1971)
- Be Good to Yourself at Least Once a Day (1972)
- Back into the Future (1973)
- Rhinos, Winos and Lunatics (1974)
- Slow Motion (1974)
- Maximum Darkness (1975)
- The Welsh Connection (1976)
- The Twang Dynasty (1992)
- Call Down the Moon (1995)
- Endangered Species (2000)
- Undrugged (2002)
- Diamonds and Coal (2006)
- Kingdom of Noise (2009)
- Reanimated Memories (2015)
- Anachronism Tango (2019)
