= Malcolm Morley (musician) =

- Genres: Psychedelic rock; progressive rock; pub rock
- Occupations: Musician, songwriter
- Instruments: Keyboards, guitar, vocals
- Years active: 1969–early 1980s; 2000–present
- Website: malcolm-morley.co.uk

Malcolm Morley is an English rock singer, guitarist and keyboard player who came to fame in the 1970s. Best known as a founder of Help Yourself and as a member of Man, he continues to perform to this day.

== Early career ==
Morley's first played with the Hoodoo Blues Band in 1965, having been invited to join by his childhood friend, drummer Dave Charles. Morley's earliest recorded release was on the eponymous debut album by the rock/blues band Sam Apple Pie in 1969.

He was then signed as a solo act by Famepushers, and gathered musicians around him to record his first album. Rather than just being backing musicians, they all formed the band Help Yourself. Their first album, Help Yourself, was recorded in late 1970 and early 1971. Morley, (guitars/keyboards/vocals) wrote all the songs on the album, which was recorded before the band had played a gig. Morley and the other members of Help Yourself toured on the Downhome Rhythm Kings package with Brinsley Schwarz & Ernie Graham (ex Eire Apparent), who shared the same management.

Morley then helped Ernie Graham record his eponymous solo album in 1971, before Graham and his guitarist Jonathan "Jojo" Glemser, joined Help Yourself who then played the 1971 Glastonbury Festival. Help Yourself's second album Strange Affair was recorded at Headley Grange and released in early 1972, by which time both Graham and Glemser had left.

The new line up appeared on their first Peel Session in April 1972 and recorded the next album Beware of the Shadow almost immediately. Just as the band was due to start a tour to promote Beware of The Shadow, Morley suffered one of his bouts of depression, ("The Shadow" referred to in the album title). Rather than cancel the tour, Deke Leonard, who had just been fired by Man, stood in, and stayed with the band after Morley had recovered, whilst Help Yourself also backed Leonard on his first solo album Iceberg

In December 1972, Help Yourself with Leonard and BJ Cole, played at Man's Christmas Party; Christmas at the Patti. In 1973, Help Yourself toured in a vaudeville show called "Happy Days", which was accompanied by the fourth Help Yourself album The Return of Ken Whaley and Happy Days an album from the show. They also recorded their second Peel Session later that year. Although United Artists asked them to record another album, they only had "half formed ideas" and gave up recording and finally disbanded in August 1973.

After the break-up of Help Yourself, Morley briefly joined pub-rock band Bees Make Honey and also played with Leonard in his band Iceberg

When Leonard rejoined Man in 1974 Morley also joined, but only stayed for one studio album Rhinos, Winos and Lunatics although he also appears (uncredited) on a retrospective live album The 1999 Party, and in a live bonus disc issued with the 2007 re-issue of Rhinos .... Finding touring difficult, especially Man's long US tours, Morley left the band the day before they were due to record their next album Slow Motion.

He moved into the attic of pub-rock venue the Hope and Anchor, Islington where he met Plummet Airlines, and in 1976 he recorded an album with Ian Gomm and Plummet Airlines as backing musicians. The album was not released at the time, and the tapes were believed lost.

He became "musical advisor" to Wreckless Eric and recorded two albums with him, but did not join his touring band. He also worked as a studio musician on albums by Kirsty MacColl, Deke Leonard and Ian Gomm, but left the music industry in the early 1980s.

== Later career ==
In 2000, encouraged by Ron Sanchez, Morley played on the Donovan's Brain album Tiny Crustacean Light Show along with former Help Yourself bandmates Richard Treece and Ken Whaley. In 2001, he released a solo album Aliens, which contained only original compositions. This prompted the search for the tapes of his unreleased 1976 album, which were rediscovered and issued as the album Lost and Found in 2002. The release of Aliens also revived interest in Help Yourself's fifth album, and the album was finally completed in 2002/2003 by Morley, Treece and Whaley, with Kevin Spacey on drums, as Charles had other commitments. The album was eventually released in 2004.

Morley still plays occasional live gigs, usually in the Walthamstow/Essex area, as support to The Green Ray.

== Discography ==
With Sam Apple Pie

Sam Apple Pie (1969)

With Ernie Graham

Ernie Graham (1971)

With Help Yourself

Help Yourself (1971)
Beware of the Shadow (1972)
Strange Affair (1972)
Christmas at the Patti (1973)
The Return of Ken Whaley (1973)
5 (2004)

With Man

Rhinos, Winos, and Lunatics (1974) (The 2007 re-issue includes a live bonus CD featuring Morley)
The 1999 Party 1974 (1998) (Morley is credited in the booklet, but not on the back cover)

With Wreckless Eric

The Wonderful World of Wreckless Eric (1978)
Big Smash! (1980)

With The Tyla Gang

Just Popped Out (1980)

With Ian Gomm

What a Blow (1980) "Come On" (1997)

With Deke Leonard

Iceberg (1973)
Kamikaze (1974)
Before Your Very Eyes (1981)

With Kirsty MacColl

Desperate Character (1981)

With Donovan's Brain

Tiny Crustacean Light Show (2000)
Great Leap Forward (2003)

Solo

Aliens (2002)
Lost and Found (2002) (With Plummet Airlines)

With The Flying Aces

Seashell (2002)
