= Deke Leonard =

Welsh musician (1944–2017)

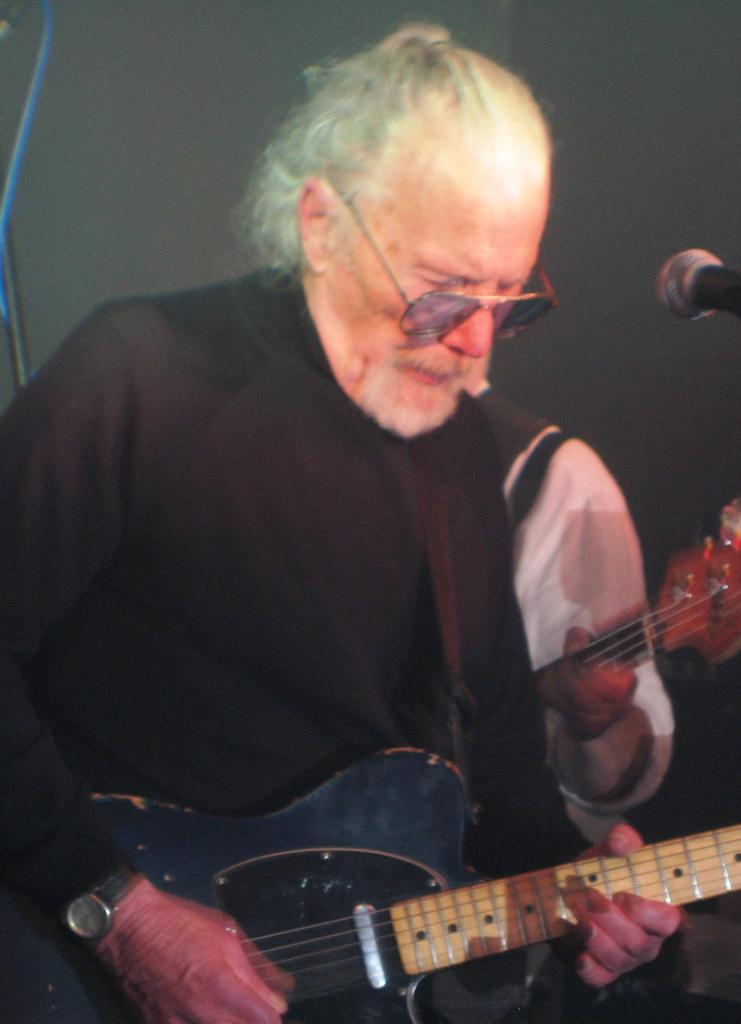
- Deke Leonard playing with Son of Man at Dagenham on 12 September 2015

Background information
- Born: Roger Arnold Leonard; 18 December 1944; Llanelli, South Wales
- Died: 31 January 2017 (aged 72)
- Genres: Rock; Rock and Roll; Psychedelic rock Progressive rock
- Occupations: Musician, songwriter, author, raconteur
- Instruments: Guitar, keyboards, vocals
- Years active: 1962–2016
- Website: www.dekeleonard.com

Roger Arnold "Deke" Leonard (18 December 1944 – 31 January 2017) was a Welsh rock musician, best known as a member of the progressive rock band Man, which he joined and left several times, and for fronting his own rock and roll band Iceberg, which he formed and disbanded several times. He was also an author, raconteur and television panelist.

== Early life ==
Leonard was born in Llanelli, South Wales. He formed his first band, Lucifer and the Corncrackers, with Mike Rees (vocals), Geoff Griffiths (drums) and Clive "Wes" Reynolds (bass), in 1962, whilst still at Llanelli Grammar School, taking his stage name from "Deke" Rivers, the character played by Elvis Presley in his second film Loving You. Leonard left school to work for a building contractor, which he left to avoid being fired, so became a full-time musician.

The Corncrackers ran their own club, the "L" Club, featuring themselves and other local musicians, whilst also playing support to acts such as Johnny Kidd & The Pirates and The Hollies at a rival venue. When Rees left they continued as a trio; Keith Hodge then replaced Griffiths, but when Reynolds left to join the South Wales band The Jets, The Corncrackers broke up.

Leonard also joined The Jets, on keyboards, but preferred playing guitar, so reformed The Corncrackers with additional guitarist Brian Breeze, before replacing Vic Oakley as bass player in The Blackjacks, with whom he toured US bases in Europe. On his return, he rejoined The Jets, with Tony "Plum" Hollis on vocals, Martin Ace (bass) and Beau Adams (drums). There were other bands named The Jets on the circuit, so they changed their name to The Smokeless Zone and took residencies in Germany, including one at Hamburg's Top Ten Club where Tony Sheridan played with them. Adams was replaced by Terry Williams, but after more European residencies, they disbanded.

When Breeze left the Corncrackers, Leonard rejoined, playing London residences and recording demos for EMI & CBS. When Hodge left, Terry Williams joined on drums and Martin Ace as a multi-instrumentalist. The band changed its style to psychedelia and its name to Dream; not sure what a "freak-out" was, they invented their own with shaving foam and confetti.

In November 1968, Leonard joined The Bystanders, to replace Vic Oakley (again), just as the band changed their musical direction, from close harmony pop to a psychedelic/American west coast style, and their name to Man.

== Man ==
Leonard initially stayed with Man until they were mixing their second album 2 Ozs of Plastic with a Hole in the Middle, then left to join his wife in Llanelli. He became productivity manager in a piano factory, but quit after supporting a wild-cat strike, and was accepted back into the band, whilst Man's original bass player and drummer were replaced by Leonard's former Dream colleagues, Martin Ace and Terry Williams. Some saw this as a take-over.

When Ace left in 1972, Leonard was fired by Micky Jones and Williams, but was immediately offered a solo record deal by Man's A&R man, Andrew Lauder. He joined Help Yourself to avoid them having to cancel a tour, as Malcolm Morley was ill, but stayed on after Morley rejoined, recording Christmas at the Patti on 19 December 1972, as support to Man.

== Iceberg ==
Leonard recorded his first 'solo' album Iceberg, with Mike Gibbins (Badfinger), Byron Berline (The Flying Burrito Brothers), Tommy Riley, Martin Ace, Beau Adams and all of Help Yourself.

Needing a band to tour and promote the album, he formed the band Iceberg, with former Corncrackers Brian Breeze (guitar) and Keith Hodge (drums), and ex-Help Yourself Paul Burton (bass). The album received good review; the single "Hard Way to Live" was on the BBC playlist and was promoted by John Peel, for whom Iceberg recorded a session on 14 May 1973

After touring the album, Martin Ace replaced Burton, and after another tour, Dave Charles replaced Hodge. This line-up recorded the Kamikaze album, with help from Dave Edmunds, but the album was seen as "a big disappointment".

They recorded another Peel session on 26 November 1973, before Ace was replaced by Help Yourself's Ken Whaley. They toured supporting Man, during which Micky Jones and Leonard arranged a new Man line-up; when Man split in December 1973, Leonard disbanded Iceberg.

== Man again ==
Leonard rejoined Man in January 1974, bringing Malcolm Morley and Ken Whaley with him. He stayed until Man disbanded in December 1976, playing on all the albums from Rhinos, Winos, and Lunatics to All's Well That Ends Well.

== Iceberg again ==
When Man disbanded, Leonard still had a solo record contract, so recorded Before Your Very Eyes, with Martin Ace, Terry Williams and others. According to Deke Leonard's sleeve notes, recording commenced around late 1977 although only one track, "Bad Luck", from then was included on the album. The remainder was recorded around April 1979. Produced by Martin Rushent, the album release was delayed until 1981, when EMI took over United Artists.

He briefly played with Sean Tyla (ex-Ducks Deluxe) in the Tyla Gang, appearing on their 1977 album Yachtless, then reformed Iceberg, initially with Lincoln Carr (bass) and Terry Williams. A later line up of Richard Treece (ex Help Yourself) (guitar & bass), B.J. Cole (pedal steel guitar) and Reg Isadore (drums) evolved into Leonard, Howard Hughes (piano) and Anthony Stone (drums) who performed another Peel Session on 15 February 1978

Also in 1978, Leonard, Big George and Pete Thomas helped Larry Wallis record an album, to be called Leather Forever, but the album was shelved, although some tracks were later released on "Pink Fairies and Deviants" compilation albums Hams (Vol 2) and Hogwash.

Leonard briefly moved to the US in 1981, where he worked on Walter Egan's album The Last Stroll, before rejoining Sean Tyla to form The Force with Micky Groome (bass) and Paul Simmons (drums). After extensive touring, they recorded an eponymous album, The Force but Tyla suffered severe stage fright and left the band, which became another Iceberg.

== Man reform ==
In 1983 Leonard disbanded Iceberg again, to join the reforming Man, playing with them until 1996, when he suffered a minor stroke. Man played as a trio until he recovered, and rejoined them in 1997.

In 2002 Leonard issued Unfinished Business a CD of demos, rejects and out-takes. Later that year Micky Jones had several operations on a brain tumour, but in 2004, when Jones had recovered enough to rejoin, Leonard decided to leave Man again.

== Later Icebergs ==
In 2004, Leonard formed another Iceberg, with former Man bassist Will Youatt, guitarist Clive "Snob" Roberts and Bob Richards (who continued drumming with Man). Roberts was diagnosed with lung cancer after their first gig, and died shortly after, being replaced by Brian Breeze, who was in turn replaced by Ray "Taff" Williams (not Ray Williams, the original Man bass player, who died in 1993).

In 2004, Leonard also recorded a solo album Freedom and Chains, the studio time being sponsored by 56 "Angels" who are credited in the sleeve-notes; and in 2005, a collection of Iceberg recordings for 1970s radio shows, including John Peel, was released as Wireless.

As of 2012 Iceberg were still performing, with Will Youatt (bass), Bob Richards (drums) and James Beck (guitar) backing Leonard.

== Writer and raconteur ==
Leonard started his writing career with sleeve notes for the 1970s Man albums. After Man disbanded he wrote articles and reviews for Vox, Studio Week and other music magazines. His first autobiographical book Rhinos, Winos & Lunatics (1996) had limited sales, but his second book Maybe I Should've Stayed in Bed? (2000) received good reviews, prompting a second edition of the first book, which has since been translated into German. In 2003, The Fiction Factory acquired the film rights to both books.

Leonard read extracts from the books for a series of BBC radio programmes It's Crazy Man which won "Best Radio Documentary" at the 2006 Celtic Film and Television Festival and were nominated for a Sony Radio Academy "Special Music Award" in 2006. He has also toured a one-man show, retelling selections of his rock'n'roll anecdotes, interspersed with songs, and has regularly appeared at the Dylan Thomas Literary Weekend in Laugharne.

Leonard has also appeared as panellist, commentator and narrator on several television and radio programmes including: Pub Rock Quiz, Rock of Ages, Dragons Breath (a history of Welsh rock music), Tales of the Road and Juke Box Heroes.

His third book The Twang Dynasty – From Memphis to Merthyr, guitarists that rocked the world. was launched at an Iceberg gig on 15 December 2011 although officially published in January 2012.

His fourth book, the third in his autobiographical series, Maximum Darkness: Man on the Road to Nowhere was launched at Micky Jones' 4th Memorial Jam on 13 December 2014, although officially published in January 2015. Also in 2015, a collection magazine articles, Deke Speaks: A collection of musings and diary notes from "The Welsh Connection", was published for Kindle.

== Death ==
Leonard died on 31 January 2017, aged 72. According to his obituary in the April 2017 edition of the magazine Classic Rock, the cause of death was heart failure.

== Discography ==
=== Man ===
See Man discography for the 25 + albums Leonard made with Man

=== Iceberg and solo albums ===
- Iceberg (1973) LP United Artists UAG 29464 – CD (Re-issued as double CD with Kamikaze) BGO Records, BGOCD288
- Kamikaze (1974) LP United Artists UAG 29544 – UK No. 50 CD (Re-issued as double CD with Iceberg) BGO Records, BGOCD288
- Before Your Very Eyes (1979) lp United Artists UAG 30240, BGO CD 14
- Unfinished Business (2002) Northdown Records, RGF DL501
- Wireless (2005) (Radio shows recorded in the 1970s) CD Hux HUX064
- Freedom and Chains (2005) Angel Air SJPCD197

=== With others ===
Help Yourself

- Christmas at the Patti (1973)
- The Amazing ZigZag Concert (recorded 1974, released 2010)

The Tyla Gang

- Yachtless (1977)

Walter Egan

- The Last Stroll (1981)

The Force

- The Force (1982) Zilch Records (Germany) 2374 195

The Flying Aces

- Seashell (2002)

Larry Wallis

- Hams (Vol 2) (2000) (Pink Fairies and Deviants Compilation)
- Hogwash (2003) (Pink Fairies and Deviants Compilation)

== Bibliography ==
- Rhinos, Winos & Lunatics. (The legend of Man a rock'n'roll band) – Northdown Publishing (1996 & Rev 2001) – ISBN 1-900711-00-1
- Maybe I Should've Stayed in Bed? (The Flip Side of the Rock'n'Roll Dream) – Northdown Publishing (2000) – ISBN 1-900711-09-5
- The Twang Dynasty (From Memphis to Merthyr; guitarists that rocked the world) – Northdown Publishing (2012) – ISBN 978-1-900711-18-0
- Maximum Darkness: Man on the Road to Nowhere – Northdown Publishing (2015) – ISBN 978-1-900711-19-7
- Deke Speaks: A collection of musings and diary notes from "The Welsh Connection" – Northdown Publishing (2015) – Kindle Edition only
