= Micky Jones =

Welsh guitarist and singer (1946–2010)

- Born: 7 June 1946; Merthyr Tydfil, Wales
- Died: 10 March 2010 (aged 63) Swansea, Wales
- Genre: Prog rock
- Instruments: Guitar, vocals
- Years active: 1960s–2002, 2004–2005
- Formerly of: Man

Charles Michael "Micky" Jones (7 June 1946 – 10 March 2010) was a Welsh guitarist and singer. He was a guitarist for the band Man from 1968 to 2002. Jones formed Man in 1968. Jones was the lead singer for the band and was known for his tenor singing voice, often compared to Frankie Valli. From the band forming until he left the band in 2002, he had been the only constant member of the band. Man had four UK top 40 albums in the 1970s and were admired by Frank Zappa.

== Personal life ==
Jones was born in the Welsh town of Merthyr Tydfil. He started playing guitar in the late 1950s when he was inspired by rock and roll artists. Jones originally played drums until he changed to guitar when he was thirteen. His first guitar, a Höfner club 40, was given to him by his parents. His father, George, played Hawaiian guitar and taught him how to play guitar. Jones' first job was as a hairdresser.

Micky met his wife, Jenny, at United Artists Records in the 1970s. They had a son, George, born in 1982. George followed in his father’s footsteps and was in Man from 2002 to 2008.

Jones was diagnosed with a brain tumour in 2002 and left the band while he had treatment. Micky briefly came back in 2004—2005 but had to leave after only a few months when his health deteriorated more. He died at a carehome in Swansea on 10 March 2010 aged 63.
