= List of multi-instrumentalists =

This is a list of multi-instrumentalists, musicians notable for a professional level of proficiency with two or more musical instruments.

== A ==
- Adam Levine
- Adam Young
- Adiescar Chase
- Adrian Rollini
- Al Jardine
- Alan Stivell
- Alan Wilder
- Alanis Morissette
- Alex James
- Alexander Gradsky
- Andrew Bird
- Andrew VanWyngarden
- Andre 3000
- Andy Summers
- Anna Calvi
- Anthony Cedric Vuagniaux
- Anthony Newman
- Anton Newcombe
- AR Rahman
- Arjen Anthony Lucassen
- Arlo Guthrie
- Atticus Ross
- Atilla Özdemiroğlu
- Aphex Twin

== B ==
- Barbara Mandrell
- Beck
- Ben Folds
- Ben Goldwasser
- Ben Kenney
- Ben Watt
- Benmont Tench
- Benny Carter
- Benny Gallagher
- Bill Evans
- Bill Nelson
- Billie Joe Armstrong
- Billy Corgan
- Billy Preston
- Billy Sherwood
- Björk
- Bob Casale
- Bob Cooper
- Booker T. Jones
- Bootsy Collins
- Brant Bjork
- Brendon Urie
- Brent Fitz
- Bret Autrey
- Brian Eno
- Brian Jones
- Brian Landrus
- Brian May
- Brian Tichy
- Brian Transeau
- Brian Wilson
- Bruce Springsteen
- Bruno Mars
- Bryan Ferry
- Bud Shank
- Buckethead
- Butch Walker

== C ==
- Carl Wilson
- Carwyn Ellis
- Cat Power
- Cat Stevens
- Catfish the Bottleman
- Charles Kelley
- Charles Mingus
- Charlie Parker
- Chris Carmichael
- Chris Cornell
- Chris Joss
- Chris Martin
- Christopher North
- Chris Potter
- Chris Thile
- Chris Wolstenholme
- Cosmo Sheldrake
- Cui Jian
- Cyndi Lauper

== D ==
- D'Angelo
- Damien Rice
- Damon Albarn
- Dan Swano
- Daniel Chorzempa
- Daniel Gildenlöw
- Daniel Johns
- Daron Malakian
- Darren Criss
- Dave Dobbyn
- Dave Grohl
- Dave Mason
- David Bedford
- David Bowie
- David Byrne
- David Gilmour
- David Hidalgo
- David Lindley
- David Munrow
- Dean Ween
- Dennis Wilson
- Denny Laine
- Derek Shulman
- Devin Townsend
- Dhani Harrison
- Dido
- Dimash Kudaibergen
- Dolly Parton
- Don Moye
- Doug Sahm
- Doug Kershaw
- Duff McKagan
- Dwele

== E ==
- Eddie Van Halen
- Eddie Vedder
- Edgar Winter
- Egon Petri
- Elfriede Jelinek
- Elliott Smith
- Elvis Costello
- Elvis Presley
- Emitt Rhodes
- Enya
- Eric Dolphy
- Eric Gillette
- Erkan Oğur
- Espen Lind

== F ==
- Feist
- Fela Anikulapo Kuti
- Ferenc Fricsay
- Flea
- Frank Zappa
- Freddie Mercury
- French Kiwi Juice

== G ==
- G.T. Moore
- Gareth Sager
- Garth Hudson
- Gary Green
- Gary Husband
- Gary Numan
- Geddy Lee
- P-Orridge
- George Harrison
- George Michael
- Gerald Casale
- Gethin Davies
- Giulio Carmassi
- Grace Slick
- Graham Bond
- Graham Lyle
- Gunhild Carling
- Gustavo Cerati
- Guy Berryman
- Gylve Nagell
- Greg Ham

== H ==
- Hank Williams Jr.
- Hans Rosbaud
- Hayley Williams
- Henry Lau
- Herbie Hancock
- Hermeto Pascoal
- Howie Epstein

== I ==
- Ian Anderson
- Ian McDonald
- Ian Underwood
- Ilan Rubin
- Imogen Heap
- Ira Sullivan
- Iva Davies

== J ==
- Jack White
- Jack Antonoff
- Jacob Collier
- Jaki Byard
- James Morrison
- James Murphy
- James Reyne
- James Taylor
- Jamie-Leigh Schultz
- Jamie Cullum
- Jason Castro
- Jeff Buckley
- Jeff DaRosa
- Jeff Fairbanks
- Jeff Lynne
- Jeff Mangum
- Jeremy Enigk
- Jerry Garcia
- Jim Sturgess
- Jimmy Page
- Joe Becker
- Joe Walsh
- John Cale
- John Deacon
- John Entwistle
- John Fernandes
- John Fogerty
- John Frusciante
- John Lennon
- John Mayer
- John Paul Jones
- John Weathers
- John Williamson
- John Zorn
- Johnny Depp
- Jon Brion
- Jon Walker
- Jonathan Davis
- Jonny Buckland
- Jonny Greenwood
- Jordan Rudess
- Joseph Jarman
- Josiah Leming
- Josh Homme
- Josh Klinghoffer
- Josh Ramsay
- Julian Gallagher
- Julius Schultz
- Justin-Lee Schultz
- Junie Morrison
- J Dilla

== K ==
- KT Tunstall
- Kabir Suman
- Karl Wallinger
- Kate Bush
- Keith Jarrett
- Keith Richards
- Ken Hensley
- Kerry Livgren
- Kerry Minnear
- Kevin Parker
- Kiko Loureiro
- Kitaro
- Klayton
- Krist Novoselic

== L ==
- Laurie Anderson
- Lenny Kravitz
- Les Claypool
- Lester Bowie
- Levent Yüksel
- Levon Helm
- Lindsey Buckingham
- Lionel Hampton
- Lisa Lopes
- Liz Phair
- Louis Cole
- Lowell George
- Lucy Kaplansky
- Luis Alberto Spinetta
- Laufey

== M ==
- M. Shadows
- Maddie Poppe
- Madlib
- Marko Hietala
- Marc Mann
- Marco Restrepo
- Marcus Mumford
- Mark Mothersbaugh
- Mark Ronson
- Mark Salling
- Martin Irigoyen
- Marvin Gaye
- Matt Bellamy
- Matt Hsu's Obscure Orchestra
- Matt Sharp
- Matt Mahaffey
- Matthew Thiessen
- Maurice Gibb
- Maynard Ferguson
- Michael Angelakos
- Michael Jackson
- Michael Monroe
- Michael Gira
- Michelle Branch
- Mick Jagger
- Mick Karn
- Mike Brown
- Mike Campbell
- Mike Dirnt
- Mike Mills
- Mike Oldfield
- Mike Patton
- Mike Portnoy
- Mike Rutherford
- Mike Shinoda
- Miles Jaye
- Mitski Miyawaki
- Myleene Klass

== N ==
- Natasha Khan
- Neal Morse
- Neil Finn
- Neil Young
- Nick Cave
- Nick Drake
- Nick Jonas
- Nick Oliveri
- Nils Lofgren
- Nobunny
- Noel Gallagher
- Norah Jones
- Nuno Bettencourt

== O ==
- Ornette Coleman

== P ==
- Owen Pallett
- PJ Harvey
- Pat Sansone
- Patrice Rushen
- Patrick Stump
- Paul McCandless
- Paul McCartney
- Paul Weller
- Pekka Pohjola
- Pete Townshend
- Pete Trewavas
- Peter Gabriel
- Peter Green
- Peter Steele
- Pharrell Williams
- Phil Collins
- Phil Shulman
- Phil Elverum
- Prince

== Q ==
- Quan Yeomans

== R ==
- Raghav Sachar
- Rahsaan Roland Kirk
- Ray Charles
- Ray Davies
- Ray Parker Jr.
- Ray Shulman
- Regina Spektor
- Regine Chassagne
- Rhiannon Giddens
- Ric Grech
- Richard Bona
- Richard Marx
- Richard Reed Parry
- Rick Wright
- Rick van der Linden
- Ringo Starr
- Rob Swire
- Robert Wyatt
- Roger Daltrey
- Roger Hodgson
- Roger Taylor
- Roger Waters
- Ron Geesin
- Ron "Pigpen" McKernan
- Ron Wood
- Rory Gallagher
- Roscoe Mitchell
- Roy Clark
- Roy Wood
- Ruth Underwood
- Ryan Ross
- Ryan Tedder
- RZA
- Ren Gill

== S ==
- Sammy Davis Jr.
- Sananda Maitreya
- Sarah Cutts
- Scott Thurston
- Serj Tankian
- Shakira
- Shavo Odadjian
- Shawn Lane
- Sidney Bechet
- Sie7e
- Siouxsie Sioux
- Skinny Hightower
- Solveig Heilo
- Squarepusher
- Stéphane Grappelli
- Stephen Stills
- Steve Hogarth
- Steve Lieberman
- Steve Winwood
- Steven Tyler
- Steven Wilson
- Stevie Wonder
- Stewart Copeland
- Sting
- Sufjan Stevens
- Sully Erna
- Synyster Gates

== T ==
- Taylor Hawkins
- Taylor Hicks
- Taylor Swift
- Taylor York
- Terry Edwards
- Terry Kath
- The Rev
- Thijs van Leer
- Thom Yorke
- Thomas Dolby
- Thomas Lang
- Tim Blake
- Tim Finn
- Tim Rice-Oxley
- Tim Smith
- Tim Weed
- Tinashe Kachingwe
- Todd Rundgren
- Tom Petty
- Tom Scholz
- Tom Waits
- Tomas Forsberg
- Tommy Lee
- Tony Banks
- Toto Cutugno
- Tracy Chapman
- Trent Reznor
- Trevor Rabin
- Troy Donockley
- Troy Van Leeuwen
- Tré Cool
- Tuomas Holopainen
- Turgun Alimatov
- Tyler Joseph

== V ==
- Van Morrison
- Vangelis
- Varg Vikernes
- Ville Valo
- Visitante

== W ==
- Walter "Junie" Morrison
- "Weird Al" Yankovic
- Will Champion
- Win Butler

== X ==
- Xavier Rudd

== Y ==
- Yusef Lateef

== Z ==
- Zach Hill
- Zedd
- Željko Joksimović
