= Three Friends (album) =

Studio album by Gentle Giant
- Released: 14 April 1972
- Recorded: December 1971
- Studios: Advision; Command Studios, London
- Genre: Progressive rock
- Length: 35:24
- Labels: Vertigo (UK); Columbia (US/Canada)
- Producer: Gentle Giant

Gentle Giant chronology
| Acquiring the Taste (1971) | Three Friends (1972) | Octopus (1972) |

Professional ratings
Review scores
| Source | Rating |
|---|---|
| AllMusic | 4.5/5 stars |
| The Daily Vault | A |

Three Friends is the third studio album by British progressive rock band Gentle Giant, released in April 1972. It was the band's first release to chart in America, peaking at No. 197 on the Billboard 200. The band gained popularity in Italy at the time, where they supported Jethro Tull during their European tour in early 1972. The album reached No. 25 on the Italian Charts. It is the only album by Gentle Giant to feature drummer Malcolm Mortimore following the departure of Martin Smith.

A concept album, Three Friends deals with three childhood friends whose lives take them very different places. However, each of the three friends are unsatisfied with their new lives. The closing song ends the story on a cliffhanger; whether or not the three friends ever reunite is never revealed.

== Production ==
Three Friends was the band's first self-produced album. The two former albums were produced by Tony Visconti, who had previously worked with David Bowie and T.Rex.

Gary Green's guitar solo on "Peel the Paint" uses an echoplex belonging to Mike Ratledge that Green's brother Jeff, a roadie with Ratledge's band Soft Machine, had borrowed.

The song "Schooldays" starts off with the sounds of a schoolyard playground in England. Ray Shulman told Songfacts about the song: "We started off using the sound effects of the schoolyard so it would be very nostalgic, and that's a whole song about being at school together, and how these friends went their own different ways. One goes into manual labour, one goes into white-collar work, and one is an artist."

== Release ==
For the U.S. and Canadian edition, on Columbia Records, the album cover was changed to a modified version of the design from the self-titled UK debut Gentle Giant. The album title and band name were added over the forehead of the giant image and the colour tinting of the cover was changed.

The US edition on Columbia also has the marker for track 6 in the wrong place. On this version, track number 5 ends early at 3:23 instead of 5:51 while incorrectly extending the length of track six from 3:04 to 5:32. This mistake remained in place on US releases of the album for decades, being carried over to the CD releases and even to online digital music distributors such as iTunes and Spotify. It has since been corrected.

== Track listing ==
All tracks are written by Kerry Minnear, Derek Shulman, Phil Shulman, and Ray Shulman.

Side one
| No. | Title | Length |
|---|---|---|
| 1. | "Prologue" | 6:14 |
| 2. | "Schooldays" | 7:37 |
| 3. | "Working All Day" | 5:12 |

Side two
| No. | Title | Length |
|---|---|---|
| 1. | "Peel the Paint" | 7:31 |
| 2. | "Mister Class and Quality?" | 5:51 |
| 3. | "Three Friends" | 3:04 |

== Personnel ==
=== Gentle Giant ===
- Gary Green – electric guitar, mandolin (track 2), tambourine (tracks 2, 5)
- Kerry Minnear – Hammond organ (tracks 1, 3–6), piano (tracks 1, 2, 5), electric piano (tracks 2, 3, 5), Mellotron (tracks 2, 6), Minimoog (tracks 1, 4, 6), Moog Modular (track 4), Clavinet (track 3), Baldwin spinet electric harpsichord (track 2, 3), vibraphone (track 2), bongos (track 2), triangle (track 2), lead vocals (2, 6)
- Malcolm Mortimore – drums, concert snare (track 2), hi-hat (track 2), bass drum (track 2)
- Derek Shulman – lead vocals (3–6)
- Phil Shulman – tenor saxophone (tracks 1, 3, 4), alto saxophone (track 3), baritone saxophone (track 3), lead vocals (1, 2, 4, 6)
- Ray Shulman – bass, fuzz bass (track 1), violins (track 4), electric violin (track 5), twelve-string guitar (track 1), vocals (track 6)

=== Additional personnel ===
- Boy's voice on "Schooldays" – Calvin Shulman
- Engineer – Martin Rushent
- Sleeve Design – Rick Breach
- Publisher – Excellency Music
- Phonographic Copyright (p) – Malibu Record Productions, Inc.

== Charts ==
| Chart (1972) | Peak position |
|---|---|
| US Billboard 200 | 197 |

| Chart (2020) | Peak position |
|---|---|
| UK Independent Albums (Official Charts) | 45 |
