= In a Glass House =

- Cover and insert pictures by Martyn Dean

Studio album by Gentle Giant
- Released: 21 September 1973
- Recorded: July 1973
- Studios: Advision, London
- Genre: Progressive rock
- Length: 38:08
- Label: Vertigo/WWA
- Producers: Gentle Giant, Gary Martin

Gentle Giant chronology
Octopus (1972)	In a Glass House (1973)	The Power and the Glory (1974)

Singles from In a Glass House
- 1. "In A Glass House b/w An Inmates Lullaby" Released: January 1974

Professional ratings
Review scores
Source	Rating
AllMusic	3.5/5 stars
Hippyland	5/5 stars

In a Glass House is the fifth album by the British progressive rock band Gentle Giant, released on 21 September 1973. The album is a loosely realised concept project based on the aphorism "Those who live in glass houses shouldn't throw stones". The record begins and ends with the sound of breaking glass. It is the first album released by the band following the departure of Phil Shulman.

The album reached No. 23 on the Italian charts in November 1973.

== Release ==
One of Gentle Giant's most popular albums (although the band themselves were not happy with it at the time, having to work under the pressure of Phil Shulman's departure), it was only available in the United States and Canada as a high priced import until 1992 when a reissued CD was released. This was because their US label Columbia Records rejected the album as uncommercial. As a result, Columbia dropped the band from the label which contractually allowed the band to take ownership of the original master recording and all rights to it. This cleared the way for the first "official" release of the title in the United States on compact disc on the band's own Alucard label.

The 2004 release had two live recordings from the tour as bonus tracks. The album was reissued in 2005 and distributed by Derek Shulman's DRT label with 1 bonus live track as part of the 35th Anniversary reissue series of the band's back catalogue. In 2009, In a Glass House became available for the first time as a digital download with bonus live recordings (these recordings differed from the original 2004 and 2005 release of the album) remastered by Fred Kervorkian under the supervision of Ray Shulman. In a Glass House received a physical release on CD as part of a 40th Anniversary series of reissues this time without any bonus tracks with plans to release vinyl versions of all the band's albums from In a Glass House through Giant for a Day in late 2010.

The final track of the album is hidden. Following the song "In a Glass House", there is a delay then a brief recapitulation of every other track on the album. The song is named "Index" in LP releases but not marked in the cover of the CD releases. The album cover had a black and white lithograph of the group covered with clear plastic ("glass") on a die-cut.

== Track listing ==
All tracks are written by Derek Shulman, Ray Shulman, and Kerry Minnear.

Side one
No.	Title	Length
1.	"The Runaway"	7:15
2.	"An Inmates Lullaby"	4:39
3.	"Way of Life"	8:04

Side two
No.	Title	Lead vocals	Length
4.	"Experience"		7:50
5.	"A Reunion"	Minnear	2:11
6.	"In a Glass House" "Index" ( (Note: On CD-pressings this small song including samples from each of the album's other songs is included in the end of In a Glass House.))		8:09

Bonus tracks on remastered CD
No.	Title	Length
7.	"The Runaway/Experience" (Live 23 September 1976 at the Philipshalle in Düsseldorf, West Germany)	10:01
8.	"In a Glass House" (Live 5 April 1974, at the Münsterlandhalle, Münster, West Germany)	9:49

- 35th anniversary disc contains only "The Runaway/Experience" bonus track with a length of 9:43

== Personnel ==
=== Musicians ===
- Derek Shulman – vocals, alto and soprano saxophones, recorder
- Gary Green – six and twelve-string guitars, mandolin, percussion, alto recorder
- Kerry Minnear – keyboards, tuned percussion, recorder, vocals
- Ray Shulman – bass guitar, violin, acoustic guitar, percussion, backing vocals
- John Weathers – drums, percussion

=== Production ===
- Arranged by Gentle Giant
- Produced by Gentle Giant and Gary Martin
- Recorded and engineered by Gary Martin
- Mixed by Dan Bornemark

== Charts ==
Chart performance for In a Glass House
Chart (2026)	Peak position
Norwegian Physical Albums (IFPI Norge) Remixed and Remastered version	5
Scottish Albums (Official Charts)	12
Swedish Physical Albums (Sverigetopplistan)	7
UK Albums Sales (Official Charts)	11
UK Independent Albums (Official Charts)	3
UK Rock & Metal Albums (Official Charts)	1
