= The Power and the Glory (Gentle Giant album) =

Studio album by Gentle Giant
- Released: September 1974
- Recorded: December 1973 – January and June 1974 ("The Power and the Glory" single)
- Studios: Advision, London
- Genre: Progressive rock
- Length: 37:11
- Labels: WWA (UK); Capitol (US)
- Producer: Gentle Giant

Gentle Giant chronology
In a Glass House (1973)	The Power and the Glory (1974)	Free Hand (1975)

Singles from The Power and the Glory
- 1. "The Power and the Glory" Released: November 1974

Professional ratings
Review scores
Source	Rating
AllMusic	3/5 stars
Sea of Tranquility	4.5/5 stars

The Power and the Glory is the sixth studio album by the British progressive rock group Gentle Giant, released in 1974. Contrary to popular belief, the title of the album and its many lyrical themes were not inspired by author Graham Greene's novel of the same name, although Derek Shulman was aware of Greene's novel. Guitarist Gary Green has cited this album as his favourite by the band.

The album was originally released in the US and Canada by Capitol Records, as would all Gentle Giant's albums until Civilian. The original LP cover was diecut, with rounded upper corners.

== Background ==
A loose concept was hatched for the album prior to recording. "At the time, the Watergate scandal was happening," recalls Derek. "The Cold War issues were coming to a head. The concept for the album was based on the corruption of power and how people on the bottom are affected by the people on top. Money and power will win no matter what and the people that are hoping for the best won’t usually get the best. The label we were on at that time, WWA, was an imprint of Vertigo. Vertigo was a fully owned company of Phonogram which is Polygram which is now Universal which will probably be GE in a week which is going to be the government soon enough. So there’s the corruption of power right there! The power and the glory! Again! Still to this day!"

== Cover art ==
The cover art, depicting a King of Spades, is taken from the 1926–1933 "Prinz-Karte-402" deck painted by Austrian Artist Hans Printz (1865–1925) and produced by the German playing card company Bernhard Dondorf Gm.b.H.

== Animated film ==
In a 2010 interview Derek Shulman announced that the band are working at creating an animated film based around the themes, characters and songs of the album. The animations subsequently became available in the album's Blu-ray release, of July 2014, which also features a remix (both in stereo and 5.1 surround format) by Steven Wilson. The new edition was released by Alucard, the company that managed Gentle Giant material.

== In popular culture ==
The second verse from "Proclamation" was sampled in Travis Scott's "Hyaena" from his album Utopia.

== Track listing ==
All tracks are written by Kerry Minnear, Derek Shulman, and Ray Shulman.

Side one
No.	Title	Lead vocals	Length
1.	"Proclamation"	D. Shulman (verses); Ensemble (interlude)	6:47
2.	"So Sincere"	Minnear (verses, chorus); D. Shulman (chorus)	3:51
3.	"Aspirations"	Minnear	4:40
4.	"Playing the Game"	D. Shulman (verses); Minnear (bridge)	6:46

Side two
No.	Title	Lead vocals	Length
5.	"Cogs in Cogs"	D. Shulman	3:07
6.	"No God's a Man"	Ensemble (verses); D. Shulman (chorus)	4:27
7.	"The Face"	D. Shulman	4:12
8.	"Valedictory"	D. Shulman (verses); Ensemble (interlude)	3:21

Bonus tracks on remastered CD
No.	Title	Lead vocals	Length
9.	"Proclamation" (Live) (bonus track on 35th anniversary CD edition)		4:54
10.	"The Power and the Glory" (Single A-side; bonus track available on certain editions only)	D. Shulman	2:53

== Personnel ==
Gentle Giant

- Gary Green – electric guitar (tracks 1, 2, 4, 5, 6, 7, 8), acoustic guitar (tracks 3, 4, 6), vocals (tracks 1, 6, 8)
- Kerry Minnear – Hammond organ (tracks 1, 2, 4, 5, 6, 8), piano (tracks 1, 2, 5, 6, 7, 8), RMI Electra-Piano (1, 4), Fender Rhodes (1), Minimoog (tracks 2, 4, 5, 8), Clavinet (tracks 2, 4, 6, 7, 10), Wurlitzer (tracks 1, 3, 4), marimba (track 4), vibraphone (track 6), cello (track 2), lead vocals on tracks 2–4
- Derek Shulman – lead vocals on tracks 1, 2 and 4–8, tenor saxophone (track 2)
- Ray Shulman – bass guitar, violin (tracks 2, 4, 7), electric violin (track 7), acoustic guitar (track 6), vocals (tracks 1, 6, 8)
- John Weathers – drums, tambourine (tracks 2, 5, 7), sleigh bells (track 6), cymbals (track 1), vocals (track 6)

== Charts ==
Chart (1974–1975)	Peak position
Canada Top Albums/CDs (RPM)	91
US Billboard 200	78

Chart (2014)	Peak position
German Albums (Offizielle Top 100)	79
