= The Missing Piece (album) =

Studio album by Gentle Giant
- Released: 26 August 1977
- Recorded: May 1977
- Studios: Relight Studios, Hilvarenbeek, The Netherlands
- Genre: Progressive rock
- Length: 36:28
- Labels: Chrysalis (UK); Capitol (US)
- Producer: Gentle Giant

Gentle Giant chronology
Playing the Fool – The Official Live (1977)	The Missing Piece (1977)	Giant for a Day! (1978)

Singles from The Missing Piece
- 1. "I'm Turning Around" Released: 29 July 1977; 2. "Two Weeks in Spain" Released: October 1977; 3. "Mountain Time" Released: 1977 (Ger.)

The Missing Piece is the ninth studio album by British progressive rock band Gentle Giant, released in 1977. After the Interview tour this return to the studio marked a change of direction for the band with the first side of the album exploring different musical directions than the band was previously known for, including pop music and punk rock, while the second side was more in the vein of their signature progressive rock style. This was the last Gentle Giant album to chart in the United States.

== Packaging ==
The front cover of the album shows a puzzle piece that fits to an uncompleted puzzle shown on the back cover of the album. The puzzle, when completed, shows a picture of the front cover of their debut album. The Unburied Treasure box set includes a replica of the uncompleted puzzle from the back cover of the album.

== Critical reception ==
Professional ratings
Review scores
Source	Rating
AllMusic	2/5 stars

The Globe and Mail wrote that "Gentle Giant has become more listenable by becoming more commercial... With The Missing Piece, the band devours mainstream and burps up a polished bit of formula recording."

== Track listing ==
All lead vocals by Derek Shulman, except "As Old as You're Young", sung by Kerry Minnear and Derek Shulman.

All tracks are written by Kerry Minnear, Derek Shulman, and Ray Shulman.

Side one
No.	Title	Length
1.	"Two Weeks in Spain"	3:07
2.	"I'm Turning Around"	3:59
3.	"Betcha Thought We Couldn't Do It"	2:25
4.	"Who Do You Think You Are?"	3:35
5.	"Mountain Time"	3:20

Side two
No.	Title	Length
6.	"As Old as You're Young"	4:21
7.	"Memories of Old Days"	7:18
8.	"Winning"	4:18
9.	"For Nobody"	4:05

Bonus track
No.	Title	Length
10.	"For Nobody" (Live, exclusively on the 35th anniversary release)	4:31

== Personnel ==
Gentle Giant

- Derek Shulman – lead vocals on all tracks
- Gary Green – electric guitar, acoustic guitar (track 7)
- Ray Shulman – bass, 12-string guitar (track 7), percussion (track 8)
- Kerry Minnear – Hammond organ (tracks 1, 2, 5–9), electric piano (tracks 1, 2, 5, 7), piano (tracks 4–6, 8), synthesizer (tracks 1, 4, 7), Minimoog (tracks 3, 6, 8), Clavinet (track 6), percussion (track 8), vocals (track 6)
- John Weathers – drums (track 1–6, 8, 9), tambourine (tracks 1, 5, 6, 8, 9), cymbal crash (track 7), percussion (track 8), drum machine (track 8)

There are no official instrument credits listed on the album.

== Charts ==
Chart (1977)	Peak position
Canada Top Albums/CDs (RPM)	81
Swedish Albums (Sverigetopplistan)	50
US Billboard 200	81

== Release history ==
- 1977, UK, Chrysalis Records CHR-1152, release date August 26, 1977, LP
- 1977, UK, Chrysalis Records CHR-1152, release date ? ? 1977, Cassette
- 1977, US, Capitol Records ST-11696, release date September 12, 1977, LP
- 1977, US, Capitol Records ST-11696, release date ? ? 1977, Cassette
- 1977, Brazil, Chrysalis Records 6307 604, release date ? ? 1977, LP
- 1981?, US, Capitol Records SN-16046, release date ? ? ?, LP (re-release)
- ?, US, Capitol Records 18742, release date ? ? ?, CD
- 1994, UK, Terrapin Trucking TRUCKCD006, release date 15 July 1994, CD (re-master)
- 1996, US, One Way CD 18469, release date 16 March 1996, CD
- 1999, UK, Beat Goes On BGOCD435, release date 16 April 1999, CD (2× CD with Giant for a Day!)
- 2005, UK, DRT Entertainment/Pinnacle RTE356, release date 5 September 2005, CD (35th anniversary enhanced re-master)
