= Derek Shulman =

Scottish musician (born 1947)

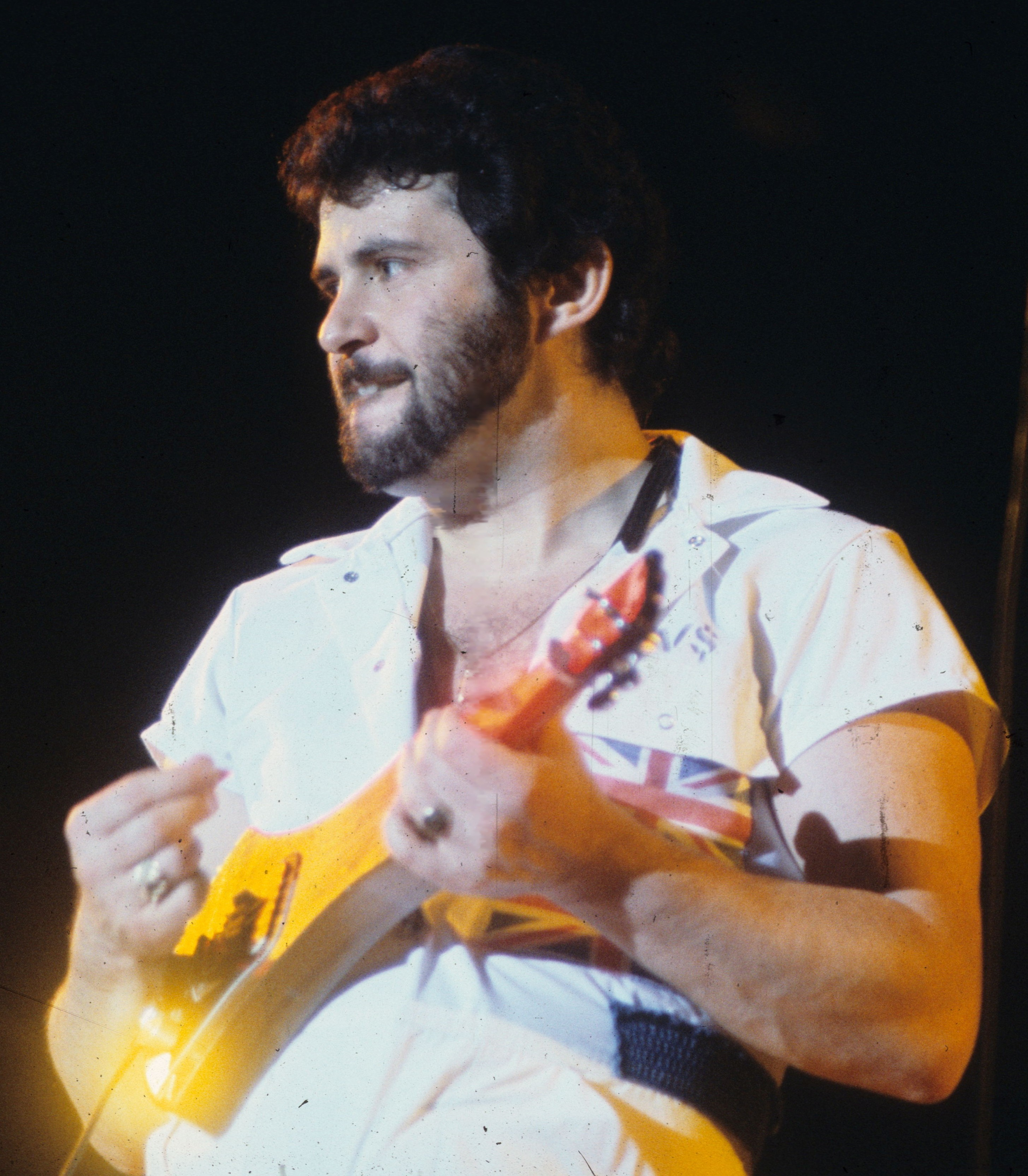
- Shulman playing the Shulberry with Gentle Giant at Yale University

Background information
- Born: Derek Victor Shulman; 11 February 1947 (age 79); Glasgow, Scotland
- Genre: Progressive rock
- Occupations: Musician; singer; music executive; songwriter; record producer
- Instruments: Vocals; Shulberry; saxophone; recorder; bass; percussion; keyboards
- Years active: 1966–present
- Formerly of: Simon Dupree and the Big Sound; Gentle Giant

Derek Victor Shulman (born 11 February 1947) is a Scottish musician and singer, multi-instrumentalist, and record executive. From 1970 to 1980, he was lead vocalist for the band Gentle Giant.

== Career ==
=== Simon Dupree and Gentle Giant ===
Born in the Gorbals, Glasgow. Shulman began his recording career as the singer of British pop band Simon Dupree and the Big Sound, with Pete O'Flaherty, Eric Hine, Tony Ransley, and his brothers Phil Shulman and Ray Shulman. Recording in the late 1960s for Parlophone Records, the band struggled with creative difficulties after experiencing some commercial success with several top 40 hits, including the top 10 hit "Kites". The band finally dissolved in 1969.

The three brothers went on to form progressive rock band Gentle Giant with guitarist Gary Green, keyboardist Kerry Minnear, and drummer Martin Smith (later replaced by Malcolm Mortimore, who was himself replaced by John "Pugwash" Weathers). In Gentle Giant, Shulman became known as a dynamic frontman in the live environment and recorded twelve albums with the band over ten years. While the band secured a loyal following of devout fans, they never experienced wide commercial success and, with their popularity waning slightly in the late 1970s, they disbanded after the release of the 1980 album Civilian. Like his band members, Shulman was adept on several instruments, including saxophone, recorder, bass, clavichord and their own Shulberry, an electric 3-stringed ukulele.

=== Record executive ===
Following his recording career, Shulman became a prominent record executive. Starting as an A&R representative at PolyGram Records, where he rose to the ranks of senior vice president, he signed Bon Jovi, Dan Reed Network, Cinderella, Kingdom Come, and Enuff Z'nuff among many others. In 1988, he became president and CEO of Atco Records, where his first signing was blues rock band Tangier, followed by progressive metal band Dream Theater and Pantera. He also re-established the careers of AC/DC and Bad Company, both of whom sold multi-platinum albums under his watch. He then went on to become president of Roadrunner Records overseeing signings like Slipknot and Nickelback. He also ran the independent label DRT Entertainment from 2003 to 2009, along with Ron Urban and Theodore "Ted" Green.

In March 2010, Shulman established a new venture with international music impresario Leonardo Pavkovic called 2PLUS Music & Entertainment.

== Discography ==
=== Albums ===
With Simon Dupree and the Big Sound

- Without Reservations (1967 Parlophone PMC 7029 or PCS 7029) – UK #39
- Amen (compilation album: 1982, See for Miles/Charly CM 109)
- Part of My Past (compilation album: 2004)

With Gentle Giant

- Gentle Giant (1970)
- Acquiring the Taste (1971)
- Three Friends (1972) (#197 US)
- Octopus (1972) (#170 US)
- In a Glass House (1973)
- The Power and the Glory (1974) (#78 US)
- Free Hand (1975) (#48 US)
- Interview (1976) (#137 US)
- The Missing Piece (1977) (#81 US)
- Giant for a Day (1978)
- Civilian (1980) (#203 US)

=== UK singles ===
With Simon Dupree and the Big Sound

- "I See the Light" / "It Is Finished" (1966 Parlophone R 5542)
- "Reservations" / "You Need A Man" (1967 Parlophone R 5574)
- "Day Time, Night Time" / "I've Seen It All Before" (1967 Parlophone R 5594)
- "Kites" / "Like The Sun Like The Fire" (1967 Parlophone R 5646) – UK #9
- "For Whom the Bells Toll" / "Sleep" (1968 Parlophone R 5670) – UK #43
- "Part of My Past" / "This Story Never Ends" (1968 Parlophone R 5697)
- "Thinking About My Life" / "Velvet and Lace" (1968 Parlophone R 5727)
- "We Are The Moles, Part 1" / "We Are the Moles, Part 2" (1968, Parlophone R 5743, as The Moles)
- "Broken Hearted Pirates" / "She Gave Me The Sun" (1969 Parlophone R 5757)
- "The Eagle Flies Tonight" / "Give It All Back" (1969 Parlophone R 5816)

With Gentle Giant

- "The Power and The Glory" / "Playing the Game" (1974)
- "I'm Turning Around" / "Just the Same" (1977)
- "Two Weeks in Spain" / "Free Hand" (1977)
- "Thank You" / "Spooky Boogie" (1978)
- "Words From the Wise" / "No Stranger" (1978)
