= Interview (album) =

Studio album by Gentle Giant
- Released: 23 April 1976
- Recorded: February–March 1976
- Studios: Advision, London
- Genre: Progressive rock
- Length: 36:47
- Labels: Chrysalis (UK); Capitol (US/Canada)
- Producer: Gentle Giant

Gentle Giant chronology
Free Hand (1975)	Interview (1976)	Playing the Fool – The Official Live (1977)

Singles from Interview
- 1. "Give It Back" Released: 1976 (Ger.)

Professional ratings
Review scores
Source	Rating
AllMusic	3.5/5 stars

Interview (stylized ĭn′terview) is the eighth album by the British progressive rock band Gentle Giant, released in 1976.

A concept album, it was critically and commercially less successful than their previous album Free Hand. Despite this, it has charted more than any other Gentle Giant album.

In addition to the usual stereo version the album was also mixed in 4-channel quadraphonic sound in 1976. The 4-channel mix was not used until 2012 when it finally appeared on DVD with encoding in multichannel LPCM, DTS and Dolby Digital surround sound formats.

== Music ==
It is a concept album conceived as a notional radio interview. Three of the tracks integrate brief "interview" sections, which were staged in the studio. The title song has lyrics derived from the type of question-and-answer dialogue they had encountered while talking to the music press. The music is as complex and intricate as the group's previous work, with a somewhat larger sound due to keyboard fireworks of Kerry Minnear. The song "Give It Back" has a reggae feel, an indication that prog rock had begun to pass out of style.

== Track listing ==
All tracks are written by Kerry Minnear, Derek Shulman and Ray Shulman.

Side one
No.	Title	Length
1.	"Interview"	6:54
2.	"Give It Back"	5:12
3.	"Design"	5:00

Side two
No.	Title	Length
4.	"Another Show"	3:29
5.	"Empty City"	4:23
6.	"Timing"	4:52
7.	"I Lost My Head"	6:57

Bonus track – 35th Anniversary reissue
No.	Title	Length
8.	"Interview" (recorded on 3 July 1976 at Calderone Theater, Hempstead, NY)	6:31

== Personnel ==
Gentle Giant

- Derek Shulman – vocals, saxes
- Gary Green – guitars
- Kerry Minnear – keyboards
- Ray Shulman – bass, violin
- John Weathers – drums

Additional personnel

- Phil Sutcliffe – interviewer

Production

- Paul Northfield – engineer
- Ken Thomas – assistant
- Geoff Allman – cover concept
- Chris Clover – airbrush

== Charts ==
Chart (1976)	Peak position
Canada Top Albums/CDs (RPM)	56
Norwegian Albums (VG-lista)	19
Swedish Albums (Sverigetopplistan)	39
US Billboard 200	137

Chart (2023)	Peak position
Scottish Albums (Official Charts)	79
UK Independent Albums (Official Charts)	29
UK Rock & Metal Albums (Official Charts)	11

== Release details ==
- 1976, UK, Chrysalis Records CHR-1115, release date 23 April 1976, LP
- 1976, U.S., Capitol Records ST-11532, release date 4 May 1976, LP
- 1976, U.S., Capitol Records ST-11532, release date ? April 1976, Cassette
- ?, U.S., Capitol Records SN-16047, release date ? ? ?, LP (reissue without picture sleeve)
- ?, U.S., Capitol Records CD 18732, release date ? ? ?, CD
- 1994, UK, Terrapin Trucking TRUCKCD005, release date ? July 1994, CD (re-master)
- 1996, U.S., One Way CD 18467, release date ? ? 1996, CD
- 1999, UK, BGO BGOCD421, release date 1 October 1999, CD (2 x CD with Free Hand) (This version is missing a few seconds of dialogue at the end of the "Interview" album.)
- 2005, UK, DRT Entertainment RTÉ 00357, release date 13 September 2005, CD (35th Anniversary Enhanced Re-Master)
- 2012, UK, EMI/Chrysalis Records CHRDX 1115, CD + DVD (DVD contains audio enhanced tracks of the album)
