= Giant for a Day! =

Studio album by Gentle Giant
- Released: 11 September 1978
- Recorded: April–May 1978
- Studio: Ramport, London; Maison Rouge, Fulham; Scorpio Sound, Euston
- Genre: Art rock, pop
- Length: 35:33
- Label: Chrysalis (UK); Capitol (US)
- Producer: Gentle Giant

Gentle Giant chronology
The Missing Piece (1977)	Giant for a Day! (1978)	Civilian (1980)

Singles from Giant for a Day!
- 1. "Thank You" Released: September 1978; 2. "Words from the Wise" Released: January 1979

Giant for a Day! is the tenth album by the British band Gentle Giant, released in 1978. The album features a pop rock sensibility, instead of their usual progressive rock sound. The band did not perform live to support this album.

== Critical reception ==
Professional ratings
Review scores
Source	Rating
AllMusic	1.5/5 stars
Philadelphia Daily News	A
Rolling Stone	unfavourable

The Philadelphia Daily News noted that "each piece works well as a distinct pop song."

== Track listing ==
All tracks are written by Kerry Minnear, Derek Shulman, and Ray Shulman, except where noted.

Side one
No.	Title	Writer(s)	Length
1.	"Words from the Wise"		4:14
2.	"Thank You"		4:50
3.	"Giant for a Day"		3:49
4.	"Spooky Boogie"		2:55
5.	"Take Me"	Derek Shulman, John Weathers	3:39

Side two
No.	Title	Writer(s)	Length
1.	"Little Brown Bag"		3:26
2.	"Friends"	Weathers	2:00
3.	"No Stranger"		2:29
4.	"It's Only Goodbye"		4:19
5.	"Rock Climber"		3:52

== Personnel ==
- Derek Shulman – vocals
- Ray Shulman – bass
- Kerry Minnear – keyboards
- Gary Green – guitars
- John Weathers – drums
