= Civilian (Gentle Giant album) =

Studio album by Gentle Giant
- Released: 3 March 1980
- Recorded: August–November 1979
- Studios: Sound City, Van Nuys
- Genre: Hard rock
- Length: 32:41
- Labels: Chrysalis (UK); Columbia (US)
- Producer: Gentle Giant

Gentle Giant chronology
Giant for a Day! (1978)	Civilian (1980)	Under Construction (1997)

Singles from Civilian
- 1. "All Through the Night" Released: 1980 (Ger.)

Professional ratings
Review scores
Source	Rating
AllMusic	2/5 stars
The Encyclopedia of Popular Music	2/5 stars
MusicHound Rock: The Essential Album Guide	2/5 stars

Civilian is the eleventh and final studio album by the British band Gentle Giant, released in 1980. It was recorded at Sound City Studios in the Van Nuys neighborhood of Los Angeles with the former Beatles engineer Geoff Emerick. Consisting mostly of short rock songs, it is closer to a traditional rock sound than the progressive style for which the band is best known. The album also marked a return to Columbia Records in the U.S. and Canada after an eight-year hiatus; the band's last album released with Columbia had been 1972's Octopus.

The album peaked at No. 203 on the Billboard 200. Soon after the album's release, Gentle Giant played a final tour and then split up.

A previously unreleased track, "Heroes No More", has been included on some CD reissues of the album. Another track from the same period, "You Haven't a Chance", appeared on the compilation album Under Construction 17 years later.

== Critical reception ==
Reviewing the 2006 Gentle Giant reissues, The Village Voice deemed Civilian "bland" and a bomb "that destroyed the band."

== Track listing ==
All tracks are written by Kerry Minnear, Derek Shulman and Ray Shulman except where noted.

Side one
No.	Title	Writer(s)	Length
1.	"Convenience (Clean and Easy)"	Derek Shulman, Gary Green	3:13
2.	"All Through the Night"		4:20
3.	"Shadows on the Street"		3:18
4.	"Number One"		4:38

Side two
No.	Title	Length
1.	"Underground"	3:47
2.	"I Am a Camera"	3:32
3.	"Inside Out"	5:51
4.	"It's Not Imagination" "That's... All... There... Is...." ( (Note: This sentence was created from music that appeared in four different songs on the album. The words were extracted from the songs and then spliced together. Some CD and vinyl releases are missing this ending.))	4:03

Bonus track
No.	Title	Writer(s)	Length
9.	"Heroes No More" ( (Note: Available on later CD re-release from One Way, plus listed as Heroes on the 1994 Terrapin Trucking UK re-issue using audio from a cassette.))	On CD-versions including the song all tracks are credited as written by Gentle Giant	4:38

== Personnel ==
Gentle Giant

- Derek Shulman – vocals
- Gary Green – electric guitars
- Kerry Minnear – keyboards, vocals
- Ray Shulman – bass, acoustic guitar, backing vocals
- John Weathers – drums, backing vocals

== Charts ==
Chart (1980)	Peak position
Canada Top Albums/CDs (RPM)	91
