= Acquiring the Taste =

Studio album by Gentle Giant
- Released: 16 July 1971
- Recorded: January–April 1971
- Studios: Advision (London); AIR (London)
- Genre: Progressive rock
- Length: 39:26
- Labels: Vertigo (UK) and (US)
- Producer: Tony Visconti

Gentle Giant chronology
Gentle Giant (1970)	Acquiring the Taste (1971)	Three Friends (1972)

Professional ratings
Review scores
Source	Rating
AllMusic	4.5/5 stars

Acquiring the Taste is the second album by British progressive rock band Gentle Giant, released in 1971 on the Vertigo label. It was the final album by the band to feature original drummer Martin Smith.

== Background ==
The album was recorded at Advision Studios in London, with engineers Martin Rushent, Big A and Garybaldi, and at AIR Studios in London, with engineer Bill Price.

== Artwork ==
The album cover artwork shows a giant tongue performing what appears to be anilingus. When the album gatefold sleeve is opened completely, however, it shows that the tongue is actually licking a peach.

== Track listing ==
All tracks are written by Kerry Minnear, Derek Shulman, Phil Shulman, and Ray Shulman; arranged by Gentle Giant, except where noted.

Side one
No.	Title	Lead vocals	Length
1.	"Pantagruel's Nativity"	Minnear (verses); D. Shulman (bridge)	6:53
2.	"Edge of Twilight" ( (Note: Percussion section written and arr. by Minnear))	Minnear (verses); Ensemble (bridge)	3:51
3.	"The House, the Street, the Room"	D. Shulman (verses); Minnear (chorus)	6:05
4.	"Acquiring the Taste" ( (Note: Arr. by Minnear))	(instrumental)	1:39

Side two
No.	Title	Lead vocals	Length
5.	"Wreck"	D. Shulman & P. Shulman (verses); Minnear (bridge)	4:39
6.	"The Moon Is Down"	D. Shulman, P. Shulman & Minnear	4:49
7.	"Black Cat"	P. Shulman	3:54
8.	"Plain Truth"	Ensemble (verses); D. Shulman (chorus)	7:36

== Personnel ==
=== Gentle Giant ===
- Gary Green – 6-string electric guitar (tracks 1, 3, 5, 6, 8), 12-string electric guitar (track 1), 12 string electric wah-wah guitar (track 7), mandolin (track 3), bass guitar (track 3), donkey's jawbone (track 7), cat calls (track 7), voice on track 8
- Kerry Minnear – Minimoog (tracks 1–5), piano (tracks 3, 5, 6, 8), Hammond organ (tracks 1–3), Mellotron (tracks 1, 5, 6), harpsichord (tracks 2, 5, 6), electric piano (tracks 2, 6), celeste (track 3), clavichord (track 3), xylophone (tracks 2, 3), vibraphone (tracks 1, 7), tympani (track 2), cello (tracks 2, 3, 7), maracas (track 7), tambourine (track 7), lead vocals (tracks 1, 2), vocals (tracks 3, 5, 6, 8)
- Derek Shulman – alto saxophone (tracks 1, 6), clavichord (track 3), cowbell (track 3), lead vocals (tracks 3, 5, 6), vocals (tracks 1, 2, 7, 8)
- Phil Shulman – clarinet (track 2), trumpet (tracks 1, 3), alto (track 6) and tenor saxophone (tracks 1, 6), piano (track 3), claves (track 7), maracas (track 8), lead vocals (track 7), vocals (tracks 1–3, 5, 6, 8)
- Ray Shulman – bass (tracks 1–3, 5–8), violin (tracks 2, 3, 5, 7), viola (track 7), electric violin (track 8), Spanish guitar (tracks 2, 3), 12 string guitars (track 6), tambourine (track 5), skulls (track 7), organ bass pedals (track 6), vocals (tracks 1–3, 6)
- Martin Smith – drums (tracks 1–3, 5–8), tambourine (track 1), gong (track 2), side drum (track 2)

=== Guest musicians ===
- Paul Cosh – trumpet (track 3), organ (track 3)
- Tony Visconti – descant recorders (track 5), treble recorder (tracks 3, 5), tenor recorder (track 5), bass drum (track 7), triangle (track 7)
- Chris Thomas – Moog programmer (tracks 1–5)

== Release details ==
- 1971, UK, Vertigo 6360 041, release date July 16, 1971, LP
- 1971, UK, Vertigo 6360 041, release date ? ? 1971, Cassette
- 1971, US, Vertigo VEL 1005, release date August 1971, LP (with gatefold cover)
- 1971, US, Vertigo VEL 1005, release date ? ? 1971, Cassette
- 1997, UK, Vertigo 842 917-2, release date ? February 1997, CD
- 1997, US, Polydor 8429172, release date ? February 1997, CD
- 2004, Russia, Somewax 189-2, release date ? ? 2004, CD
- 2005, UK, Repertoire REPUK1072, release date 28 November 2005, CD (limited edition reissue)
- 2005, UK, Repertoire REPUK1111, release date ? ? 2005, CD (digital remaster)
- 2012, UK, BGO Records BGOCD1095, release date ? ? 2012, CD (digital remaster 2CD with self-titled)

== Charts ==
Chart (2020)	Peak position
UK Independent Albums (Official Charts)	46

== Literature ==
- Lundberg, Mattias (8 April 2014). "Motivic cohesion and parsimony in three songs from Gentle Giant's Acquiring the Taste (1971)". Popular Music. 42 (2). Cambridge University Press: 269–292. doi:10.1017/S0261143014000257. (Textual analysis of three songs of the album)
