= Octopus (Gentle Giant album) =

Studio album by Gentle Giant
- Released: 1 December 1972
- Recorded: 24 July – 5 August 1972
- Studios: Advision, London
- Genre: Progressive rock
- Length: 34:09
- Labels: Vertigo (UK); Columbia (US/Canada)
- Producer: Gentle Giant

Gentle Giant chronology
Three Friends (1972)	Octopus (1972)	In a Glass House (1973)

Alternative cover
- US and Canadian release.

Octopus is the fourth album by British progressive rock band Gentle Giant, released in 1972 through Vertigo in Europe and though Columbia in North America. It was the band's last album in which all the Shulman brothers were involved, as Phil left the band after the release. It was also the first album with new drummer John Weathers, who remained with the band until their dissolution in 1980. Octopus remains a highly regarded example of the progressive rock genre.

== Background and release ==
Octopus was named as a pun on "octo opus" (eight musical works, reflecting the album's eight tracks).

On 30 October 2015, a Steven Wilson remix was released on CD/Blu-ray via the band's Alucard label. Three tracks (1, 2 & 5) could not be discretely remixed since one multi-track reel was missing. Instead, those three tracks were upmixed to 5.1 surround using the Penteo surround software. The remaining five tracks were remixed to 5.1 by Steven Wilson.

== Music and lyrics ==
Octopus maintained Gentle Giant's trademark of broad and challenging integrated styles. The album's tracks have been described as "stylistically and sonically all over the place but always in control." One of the highlights was the intricate madrigal-styled vocal workout "Knots". The album's lyrics are generally based on literature and philosophy: "The Advent of Panurge" is inspired by the books of Gargantua and Pantagruel by François Rabelais; "A Cry for Everyone" is inspired by the work and beliefs of the French writer Albert Camus, while the song "Knots" is inspired by the book Knots by the Scottish psychiatrist R. D. Laing.

== Artwork ==
The UK release by Vertigo featured art by Roger Dean. Dean's logo appears inside the lyrics booklet.

US and Canadian releases were released by Columbia and used a different cover by Charles White.

== Critical reception and legacy ==
Professional ratings
Review scores
Source	Rating
AllMusic	4.5/5 stars

Later reviews about the album have remained positive. AllMusic said that Octopus is "an album that has withstood the test of time a lot better than anyone might have expected."

In the Q & Mojo Classic Special Edition Pink Floyd & The Story of Prog Rock, the album came #16 in its list of "40 Cosmic Rock Albums". In The 100 Greatest Prog Albums Of All Time, by ProgMagazine, Octopus stands at number 65.

In 2013, progressive death metal band Witherscape covered the track "A Cry for Everyone", and issued it for release on their The Inheritance album.

The 2015 reissue of the album, mixed by Steven Wilson, entered the BBC Rock Chart at No. 34.

In 2023, John Cunningham of WhatCulture wrote: "While some may argue Acquiring the Taste is the group's magnum opus, Octopus was the trailblazer. An unwieldy but incredibly catchy and creative installment in the genre's mid '70s boom period."

== Track listing ==
All tracks are written by Kerry Minnear and Ray Shulman (music); lyrics jointly written by Derek Shulman and Phil Shulman.

Side one
No.	Title	Music	Lead vocals	Length
1.	"The Advent of Panurge"	Minnear	main: Kerry; other: Derek and Phil	4:41
2.	"Raconteur Troubadour"	Minnear	Derek	4:01
3.	"A Cry for Everyone"	R. Shulman	Derek	4:04
4.	"Knots"	Minnear	Phil, Kerry, Derek & Ray	4:11

Side two
No.	Title	Music	Lead vocals	Length
5.	"The Boys in the Band"	R. Shulman	instrumental	4:34
6.	"Dog's Life"	R. Shulman	Phil	3:11
7.	"Think of Me with Kindness"	Minnear	Kerry	3:34
8.	"River"	R. Shulman	main: Derek, other: Phil	5:53

The Steve Wilson Mix has the same tracks and order as the original album with one addition track:

No.	Title	Music	Length
9.	"Excerpts from Octopus" (Live)	Kerry Minnear and Ray Shulman	15:40

== Personnel ==
Gentle Giant

- Kerry Minnear – keyboards, Moog synthesizer, vibraphone, cello, percussion, lead and backing vocals
- Ray Shulman – bass, violin, guitar, percussion, vocals
- Gary Green – guitars, percussion
- Derek Shulman – lead vocals, alto saxophone
- Phil Shulman – trumpet, saxophones, mellophone, lead and backing vocals
- John Weathers – drums, xylophone, percussion

Production

- Gentle Giant – production
- Martin Rushent – engineering, laughter, coin spin
- Mike Viccars – Moog operator
- Cliff Morris – mastering
- Geoff Young – tape operator
- Murray Krugman – American supervision

Design

- Roger Dean – illustration and art (UK)
- John Berg – cover concept & design
- Fluid Drive – art (US)
- Charles White III – illustration (US)
- Kenny Kneitel – design
- Michael Doret – lettering

== Charts ==
Chart (1972)	Peak position
US Billboard 200	170

Chart (2015)	Peak position
UK Rock & Metal Albums (Official Charts)	34

== Release history ==
Region	Date	Label
United Kingdom	1 December 1972	Vertigo Records
United States	February 1973	Columbia Records

== Literature ==
- Sivy, Robert Jacob (2016). Philippe Gonin (ed.). "Interwoven Patterns and Mutual Misunderstandings: Binding R.D. Laing's Psychology with Gentle Giant's Knots". Prog Rock in Europe: Overview of a persistent musical style. Dijon: Éditions universitaires de Dijon: 131–143. ISBN 9782364411753. (Conference journal. Analysis of the song Knots)
