= Gentle Giant (album) =

Studio album by Gentle Giant
- Released: 27 November 1970
- Recorded: August 1970
- Studios: Trident Studios, London
- Genre: Progressive rock
- Length: 37:00
- Label: Vertigo
- Producer: Tony Visconti

Gentle Giant chronology
Gentle Giant (1970)	Acquiring the Taste (1971)

Professional ratings
Review scores
Source	Rating
AllMusic	4/5 stars
The Encyclopedia of Popular Music	3/5 stars

Gentle Giant is the debut album by the British progressive rock band Gentle Giant, released in 1970.

== Releases ==
Since the LP was not originally released in the United States, the cover illustration was instead used for the Three Friends album.

== Track listing ==
All tracks are written by Kerry Minnear, Derek Shulman, Phil Shulman, and Ray Shulman.

Side one
No.	Title	Lead vocals	Length
1.	"Giant"	D. Shulman	6:24
2.	"Funny Ways"	P. Shulman (verses, chorus); D. Shulman (chorus, bridge)	4:23
3.	"Alucard"	Ensemble	6:01
4.	"Isn't It Quiet and Cold?"	P. Shulman	3:53

Side two
No.	Title	Lead vocals	Length
5.	"Nothing at All"	P. Shulman (verses, chorus); D. Shulman (verses, chorus, bridge)	9:08
6.	"Why Not?"	D. Shulman (verses, chorus); Minnear (bridge)	5:31
7.	"The Queen"	(instrumental)	1:40

== Personnel ==
=== Musicians ===
- Gary Green – lead guitar, 12 string guitar (2, 4 & 5), backing vocals
- Kerry Minnear – Hammond organ (1–3 & 5–7), Minimoog (3, 5 & 7), Mellotron (1, 3, 6 & 7), electric (5), acoustic (2 & 5) and honky-tonk (4) piano, tympani (tracks 1 & 3), xylophone (4), cello (2), bass guitar (2), backing and lead (3 & 6) vocals
- Derek Shulman – lead (1–3, 5 & 6) and backing vocals, bass (4)
- Phil Shulman – trumpet (1–3 & 7), alto (3) and tenor (5 & 6) saxophones, descant (6), treble (6) and tenor (6) recorder, backing and lead (2–5) vocals
- Ray Shulman – bass guitar (1–3 & 5–7), electric (5–7) and acoustic (5) guitar, violin (1), violins (2 & 4), triangle (2), backing vocals
- Martin Smith – drums (tracks 1–3 & 5–7), brushed snare drum (track 4)

=== Additional musicians ===
- Paul Cosh – tenor horn (1)
- Claire Deniz – cello (4)

=== Production ===
- Roy Baker – recording engineer
- George Underwood – cover artist
- Tony Visconti – producer

== Charts ==
=== Weekly charts ===
Chart (2024)	Peak position
Greek Albums (IFPI)	62
