= Azrael's Tear =

1996 video game

- Developer: Intelligent Games
- Publisher: Mindscape
- Designers: Ken Haywood, Richard Guy
- Programmer: Martin Fermor
- Composers: Kerry Minnear, Ray Shulman
- Platform: MS-DOS
- Release: EU: August 26, 1996; NA: October 4, 1996
- Genre: Adventure
- Mode: Single player

Azrael's Tear is a 1996 first-person adventure game that presents an eschatological conspiracy fiction narrative about a futuristic Grail Quest. It was published by Mindscape and developed by Intelligent Games.

== Plot ==
The game is set in the period from early December 2012 to Christmas Day 2015. The player assumes the role of a highly skilled professional grave robber/archaeologist known as a "raptor", who has come to raid a massive 12th-century underground complex recently found in Wick, Caithness, Scotland. The existence of the cavern is not publicly known. The player character has come in response to rumors, spreading within their criminal community, to the effect that the site may conceal the Holy Grail. The player character's history is not detailed in the game. This could be said to echo the Abrahamic message that God will accept any firm and sincere repentance, regardless of the petitioner's origin or past.

== Development ==
Ken Haywood produced the original concept for the game and worked with Intelligent Games's own Richard Guy on the final design. The original design called for a Myst-style pre-rendered environment. As development progressed, the team switched to real-time 3D. The game features music written by Ray Shulman and Kerry Minnear, both former members of Gentle Giant.

As well as implementing proper real-time 3D in both environments and actors with full texture mapping, a major feat that was achieved back when most adventure games were exclusively two-dimensional or used pre-rendered elements for its backgrounds, Azrael's Tear is also the first adventure game to employ this technology, only preceded by Under a Killing Moon (1994) by two years, although the latter had its digital characters portrayed in full-motion video.

== Reception ==
Reception

Review scores
Publication	Score
GameSpot	5.6/10
Next Generation	3/5
Arcane	7/10
Just Adventure	A−
PC Games	A

Both GameSpot and Next Generation commented that the control interface is highly counterintuitive, especially the inverted cursor movement, and cannot be changed. GameSpot reviewer Tal Blevins opined that the game is otherwise well-worth playing, citing the atmospheric music, entertaining story, and good integration of the puzzles into the plot. He was particularly pleased with the graphic design, remarking that "the game is steeped in shadow that hides a subtle richness; it may take several game sessions for you to truly appreciate the brilliant artistic design included." The Next Generation reviewer agreed that the story is gripping but was somewhat less impressed, summarizing, "Azrael's Tear brings adventure, high-resolution graphics, and a smattering of action to what is essentially a Myst clone, adding a little life - just a little - to a genre that sorely needs it." Nicholas Petreley of InfoWorld wrote, "Azrael's Tear is not a crowd-pleaser, and I'm grateful for it. It is for those people who like to lose themselves in an entirely different world. If you're among that camp, prepare to enter the world of Azrael's Tear and rarely come up for air."

Andy Butcher reviewed Azrael's Tear for Arcane magazine, rating it a 7 out of 10 overall. Butcher comments that "If you take the time to get into it [...] Azrael's Tear is atmospheric and extremely satisfying."

In a 2002 retrospective review for Just Adventure, Michael Necasek commented, "The story of Azrael's Tear revolves around props far from unusual in adventure games: the Holy Grail, the Knights Templar, secret conspiracies to rule the world. These all are almost clichés. But like other good games (Gabriel Knight 3 comes to mind), Azrael's Tear manages to explain them with unexpected twists."

Azrael's Tear was not a commercial success. However, project leader Matthew Stibbe said in a presentation on the history of games that it is the only game he produced that got fan mail.
