= Panurge =

Character from Gargantua and Pantagruel by François Rabelais

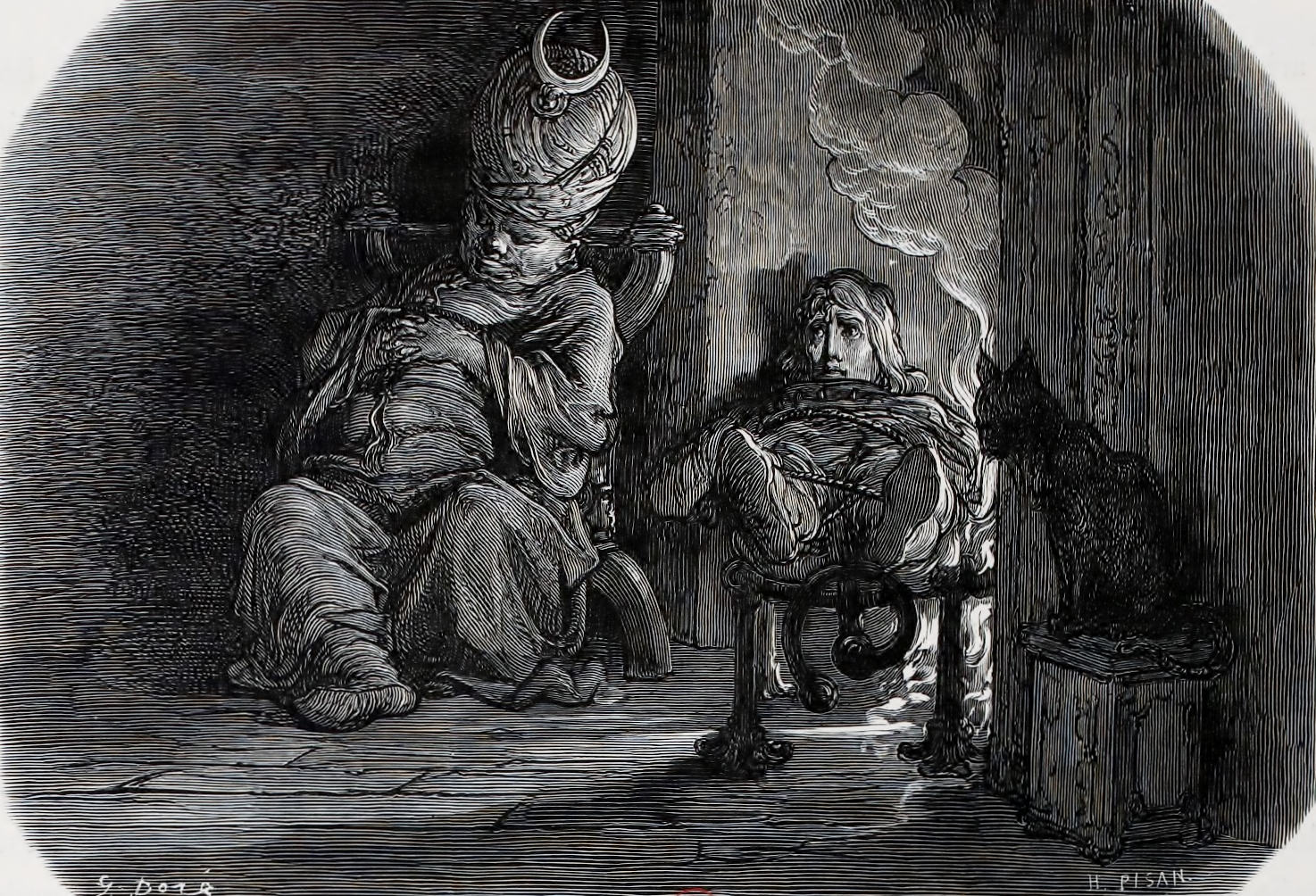
Panurge captured by the Turcs. (etching by Gustave Doré)

Panurge (from Koine Greek: πανοῦργος, romanized: panóùrgos, lit. 'ready for anything', used to mean "knave, rogue") is one of the principal characters in Gargantua and Pantagruel, a series of five novels by François Rabelais. Especially important in the third and fourth books, he is an exceedingly crafty knave, libertine, and coward.

In Chapter 9 of the second book, he shows that he can speak many languages (German, Italian, Scottish, Dutch, Spanish, Danish, Hebrew, Greek, Latin and French), including some of the first examples of a constructed language.

In French, reference to Panurge occurs in the phrase mouton de Panurge, which describes an individual who will blindly follow others regardless of the consequences. This is after a story in which Panurge buys a sheep from the merchant Dindenault and then throws the sheep into the sea as revenge for being overcharged. The rest of the sheep in the herd follow the first over the side of the boat despite the best efforts of the shepherd.

Suddenly, I do not know how, it happened, I did not have time to think, Panurge, without another word, threw his sheep, crying and bleating, into the sea. All the other sheep, crying and bleating in the same intonation, started to throw themselves in the sea after it, all in a line. The herd was such that once one jumped, so jumped its companions. It was not possible to stop them, as you know, with sheep, it's natural to always follow the first one, wherever it may go.

— Francois Rabelais, Quart Livre, chapter VIII

== Other uses ==
- ⲡⲁⲛⲟⲩⲣⲅⲟⲥ (πανοῦργος) occurs in the Nag Hammadi Library (350 CE), among others in Codex I, Tripartite Tractate, leaf 107 line 11, anachronistically translated with "And he is more cunning than all the evil powers.".
- Panurge is also the title of an opera by Jules Massenet, based on the character.
- Panurge is an alternative electronica trio from Vancouver, British Columbia
- "The Advent of Panurge" is a song by Gentle Giant.
- "Le mouton de Panurge" is a song by Georges Brassens (1964).
- Les Moutons de Panurge is a piece by composer Frederic Rzewski (1969).
