= Jacqui Chan =

Trinidad and Tobagonian dancer, actress and singer (1934–2026)

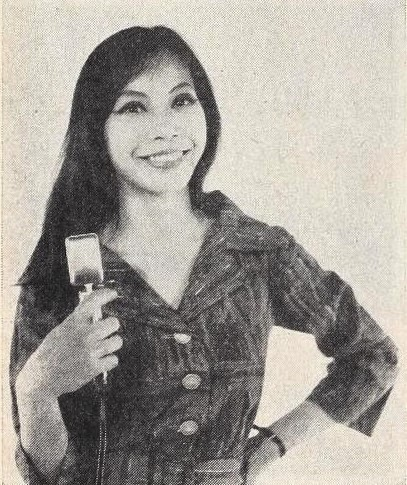
- Chan in 1961
- Born: Jacqueline Chan; 15 July 1934; Port of Spain, Trinidad and Tobago
- Died: 19 May 2026 (aged 91)
- Occupations: Actress; dancer; singer
- Years active: 1954–2023

Jacqueline Chan (15 July 1934 – 19 May 2026) was a Chinese Trinidadian dancer, actress, and singer.

== Early life and education ==
Chan was born in Port of Spain, Trinidad and Tobago, on 15 July 1934, to a Chinese mother and a Chinese-Russian father. Her parents had both migrated to British Guiana as indentured laborers to work on a sugar cane plantation. Her father's cousin was the mother of the artist Carlisle Chang. She moved to England at age 16 and studied at the Elmhurst Ballet School. She enrolled in a three-year teaching course at the Royal Academy of Dancing, but abandoned it after a year and was cast successively in two productions of Teahouse of the August Moon.

== Acting career ==
Chan became a principal dancer in the London West End production of The King and I, and was soon placed in the London stage production of The World of Suzie Wong. In the immensely successful film version of the play, she played, against type, the rather plain Gwennie earning appreciative notice. Subsequently she performed the leading role in the 1961 stage production in Australia. Chan's other acting roles included parts in Dixon of Dock Green, Armchair Theatre, Ghost Squad, The Saint, The Main Chance, and Marco Polo. Chan also appeared in the films Cleopatra and Krakatoa: East of Java.

== Singing ==
She released one single in 1960 on the Pye Records label called "But No One Knows". She also performed a spoken interlude in Mandarin Chinese on the recording of the 1967 psychedelic song "Kites" by the British band Simon Dupree and the Big Sound, which reached number 9 on music charts in the United Kingdom in late 1967. According to the later testimony of the group's then-bassist, Peter O'Flaherty, he did not know the meaning of the Chinese words that Chan was saying, and neither did she.

== Death ==
Chan died on 19 May 2026, at the age of 91.

== Popular culture ==
In the Netflix series The Crown, Chan is played by Chinese-born British actress Alice Hewkin. In the series, Chan is depicted having a brief sexual relationship with Antony Armstrong-Jones before his marriage to Princess Margaret. Her portrayal in the series has led to criticism, with Hanna Flint of Yahoo! Movies suggesting her depiction played into orientalist stereotypes.
