= Gary Green (musician) =

English musician (born 1950)

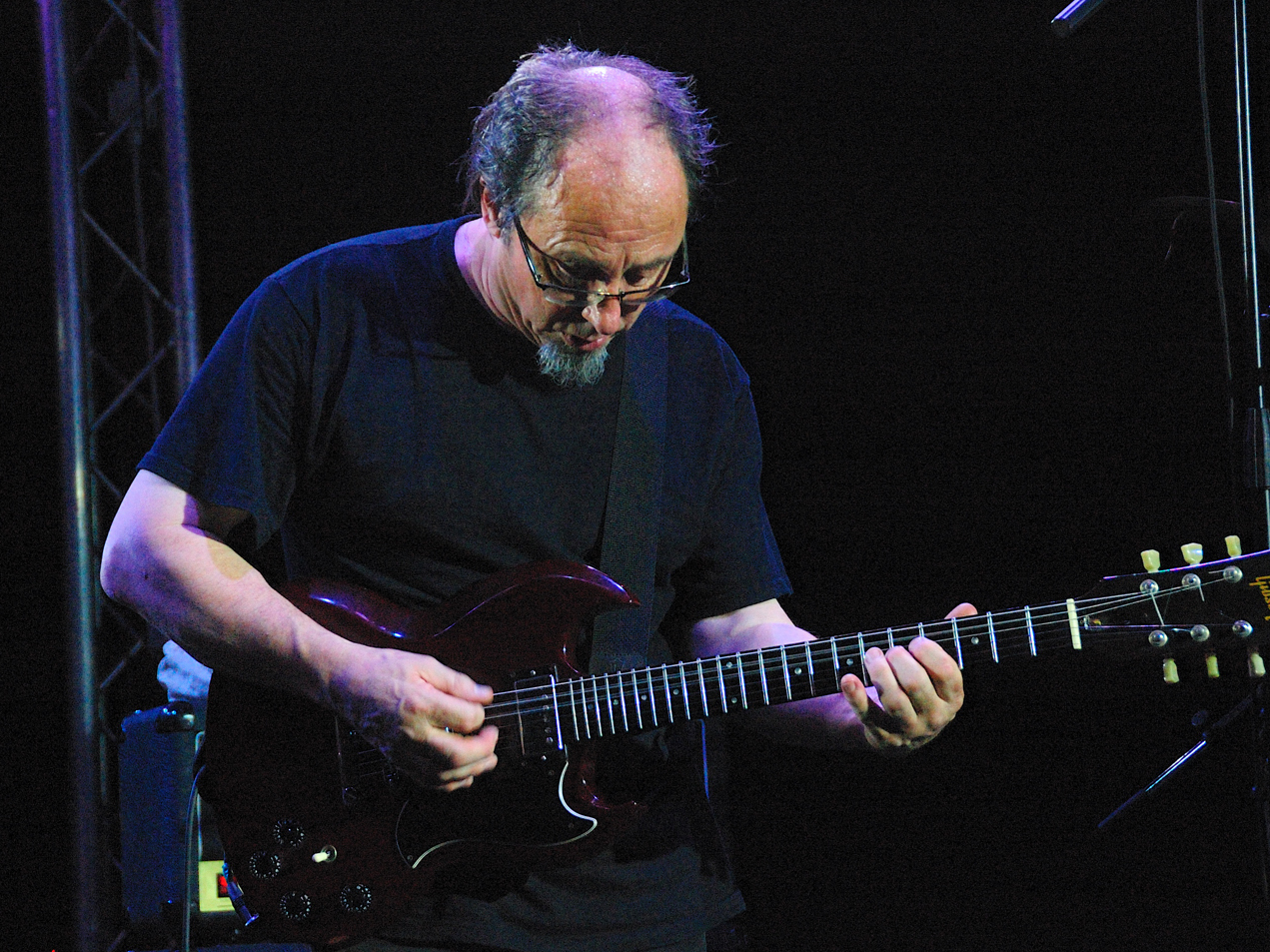
- Green in 2010

Background information
- Born: Gary William Green; 20 November 1950 (age 75); Stroud Green, North London, England
- Genres: Progressive rock; blues rock
- Occupation: Musician
- Instruments: Guitar; mandolin; bass; recorder
- Years active: 1970s–present

Gary William Green (20 November 1950 in Stroud Green, North London, England) is an English musician. During the 1970s, he was the guitarist for the progressive rock band Gentle Giant. Green was with the band throughout their recording career. Green's style was different from most of his peers, being a more blues-based guitarist. Like his fellow band members, Green was also adept at other instruments, including mandolin and recorder. According to a 2008 interview, founding member Phil Shulman said that, despite Green's blues influences, he fit in well with the band's progressive style since Green was "quick on the up-take."

Later on, he was a member of the band Mother Tongue, and also recorded on The Green Album with Eddie Jobson and Zinc. Green has worked with Billy Sherwood on a number of projects, including Back Against The Wall (2005) and Return to the Dark Side of the Moon (2006). He is now a member of a band called Three Friends with fellow Gentle Giant member Malcolm Mortimore.

Green lives in Illinois, United States, with his wife, Judy.

Gary Green's brother, Jeff Green, is a jazz guitarist who has played and toured with Stephane Grapelli, Nigel Kennedy, Elton Dean and several others, and was, briefly, a roadie for Soft Machine in the early 1970s.

== Discography with Gentle Giant ==
- Gentle Giant (1970)
- Acquiring the Taste (1971)
- Three Friends (1972)
- Octopus (1972)
- In a Glass House (1973)
- The Power and the Glory (1974)
- Free Hand (1975)
- Interview (1976)
- Playing the Fool (live) (1977)
- The Missing Piece (1977)
- Giant for a Day! (1978)
- Civilian (1980)
