= John Weathers =

Welsh musician

John "Pugwash" Weathers
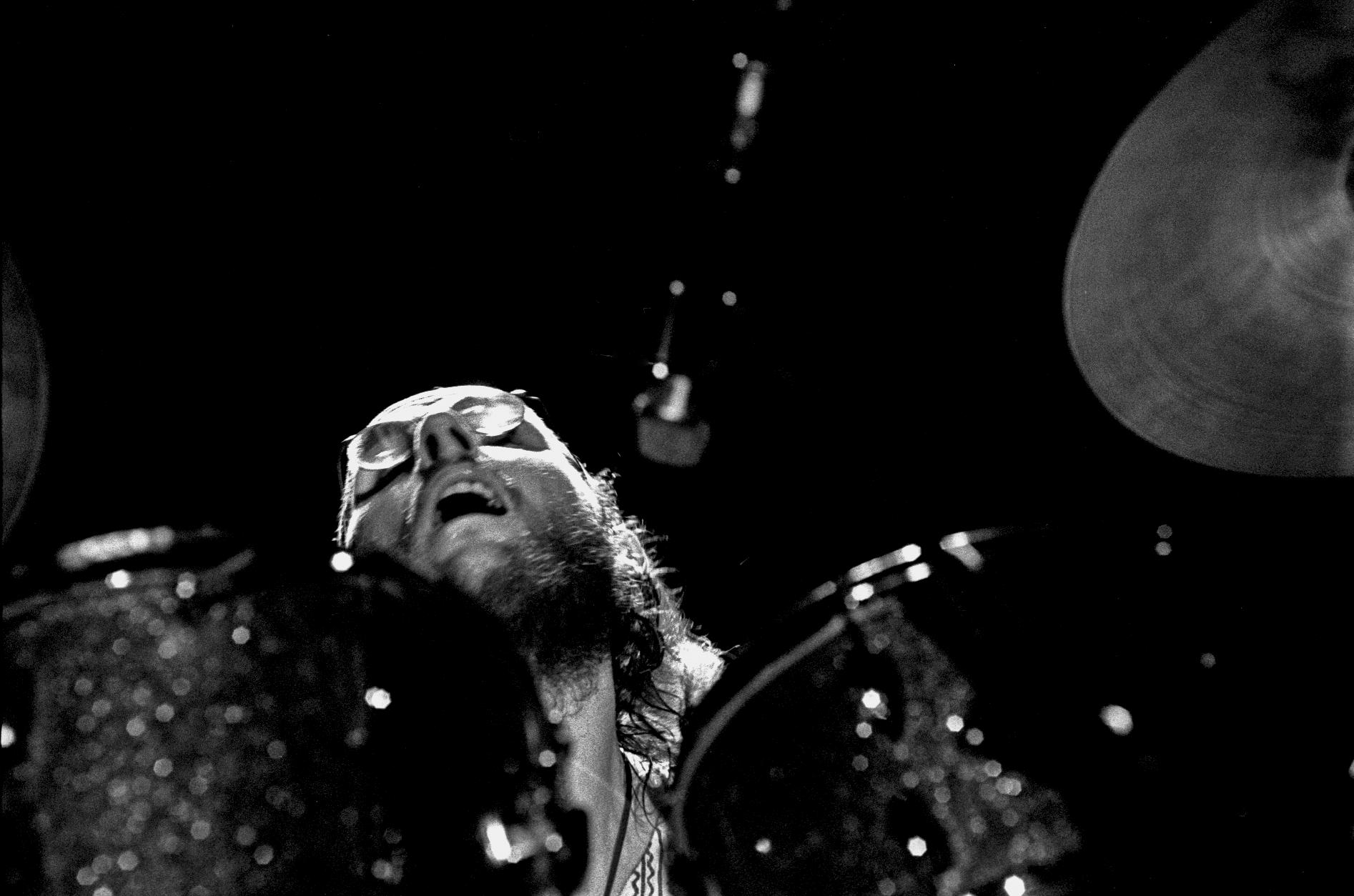
- John Weathers, 1974

Background information
- Born: John Patrick Weathers; 7 February 1947 (age 78); Carmarthen, Carmarthenshire, Wales
- Genres: Progressive rock; psychedelic rock; rock; blues
- Occupation: Musician
- Instruments: Drums; percussion; vocals; vibraphone; xylophone; guitar
- Years active: 1966–2006
- Formerly of: Pete Brown & Piblokto!, Wild Turkey, Gentle Giant, Man

John Patrick 'Pugwash' Weathers (born 7 February 1947) is a retired Welsh rock drummer, best known for playing with the progressive rock band Gentle Giant.

== Early life ==
Born in Carmarthen, Carmarthenshire, Wales, he moved to Swansea until, aged 15, he went to live with his aunt in Liverpool, just as the Merseybeat scene exploded. Weathers had had a drum-kit as a child, so took up drumming again, playing in several local bands. Returning to Wales in 1964, his experience on the Mersey scene got him into several local bands, including The Vikings (1964) and The Brothers Grimm (1965).

== Eyes of Blue ==
In 1966 Weathers joined a Neath band The Eyes of Blue, along with Phil Ryan (keyboards) and Gary Pickford-Hopkins (vocals) from The Smokestacks. The band turned professional, and won the 1966 Melody Maker Beat Contest. The prize was a one-year record contract, but they had to record songs chosen for them, rather than their own material and neither of their singles, "Heart Trouble" / "Up And Down" and "Supermarket Full of Cans" / "Don't Ask Me To Mend Your Broken Heart", sold well.

The Eyes of Blue changed label from Decca to Mercury Records and recorded their first album Crossroads of Time in 1968. They then recorded an album Buzzy, as the backing band for American singer-songwriter Buzzy Linhart, before recording their second album In Fields of Ardath in 1969.

The band Strawberry Dust supported The Eyes, and impressed Weathers, who persuaded Lou Reizner to commission an album, which Weathers produced and wrote/co-wrote 6 songs. Women & Children First was released in 1970, but Reizner renamed the band Ancient Grease, without telling them, and credited himself as co-producer.

The Eyes of Blue's third album, Bluebell Wood, released under the pseudonym Big Sleep, was their last, as the band broke up shortly afterwards. Weathers briefly played with Strawberry Dust, until they also broke up, later reforming as Racing Cars. After this break up he played drums on the final appearance of the Swansea Soul band the John Smith Committee.

In 1970 Weathers and Phil Ryan joined Pete Brown & Piblokto! playing on one single, "Flying Hero Sandwich" / "My Last Band", before Piblokto also disbanded. Weathers then joined an embryonic Wild Turkey with Glenn Cornick (ex-Jethro Tull), Gary Pickford-Hopkins (ex Eyes of Blue) and Graham Williams (ex Strawberry Dust), but Weathers and Williams left to join Graham Bond's Magick before Wild Turkey recorded any material. He appeared on Graham Bond's 1971 album, We Put Our Magick on You, and later that year joined The Grease Band.

== Gentle Giant ==
(For details of Weathers' work in this period see Gentle Giant)

Weathers joined Gentle Giant in 1972, as a temporary stand in for their drummer Malcolm Mortimore, who had been injured in a motorcycle accident. He first played on Gentle Giant's Octopus album, and his position soon became permanent, remaining with them until they broke up, after their last album Civilian (1980). He was well liked by fans for his distinctive hard-bashing drum style, and also played vibes and xylophone, among other percussion instruments. He also added his vocals in both studio and live performances more and more frequently as time went on, even singing lead on the song "Friends", which he also composed.

Whilst with Gentle Giant, Weathers occasionally played with Phil Ryan's band The Neutrons, including their 1974 album, Black Hole Star.

== Man and recent years ==
After Gentle Giant disbanded in 1980, Weathers played a number of temporary positions, until he joined the psychedelic/progressive rock band Man when they reformed in 1983. Apart from a short spell, when he was unwell and Rick Martinez temporarily took over, he stayed with Man until 1996, recording 2 studio albums and 3 live albums, and becoming their longest serving drummer, allegedly leaving because Gentle Giant were planning to reform. He left Man shortly before Phil Ryan re-joined the band. Weathers was featured in the 1986 S4C TV programme Rocking with a Sikh, backing the Sikh Elvis impersonator Peter Singh, along with Martin Ace and Micky Jones.

Weathers was variously reported to have been suffering from RSI or arthritis, but according to him was actually "diagnosed with a condition called Spinocerebellar ataxia, which is akin to M.S". The unpublished memoirs of his time spent in Morriston Hospital – Two Weeks in Pain – Under the Knife, document the trials of an NHS in-patient in post-op recovery.

Weathers has appeared on several Welsh TV soundtracks, and in 2006 rejoined Wild Turkey, to record their album You & Me in the Jungle and tour Europe.

Weathers is also a keen ornithologist.

== Discography ==
=== with Eyes of Blue ===
- Crossroads of Time (1968)
- In Fields of Ardath (1969)

=== with Buzzy Linhart ===
- Buzzy (1969)

=== with Big Sleep ===
- Bluebell Wood (1971)

=== with Graham Bond with Magick ===
- We Put Our Magick On You (1971)

=== with Gentle Giant ===
- Octopus (1972)
- In a Glass House (1973)
- The Power and the Glory (1974)
- Free Hand (1975)
- Interview (1976)
- Playing the Fool (1977, live)
- The Missing Piece (1977)
- Giant for a Day! (1978)
- Civilian (1980)

=== with The Neutrons ===
- Black Hole Star (1974) (some tracks)

=== with Man ===
- Friday 13th (1984, live)
- The Twang Dynasty (1992)
- Call Down The Moon (1995)

=== with Peter Welch ===
- Just For The Crack (1986)

=== with Huw Chiswell ===
- Rhywbeth O'i Le (1986)
- Rhywun Yn Gadael (1989)

=== with Wild Turkey ===
- You and Me in the Jungle (2006)
