= Simon Dupree and the Big Sound =

British psychedelic band

Simon Dupree and the Big Sound was a British psychedelic band formed in 1966 by the brothers Derek (vocals), Phil (vocals, saxophone, trumpet), and Ray Shulman (guitar, violin, trumpet, vocals); also known for their later prog rock band, Gentle Giant.

== Career ==
They started as The Howling Wolves and then became The Road Runners, playing R&B around the Portsmouth area, home of the Shulman brothers, becoming Simon Dupree and the Big Sound in early 1966. Making up the rest of the group were Peter O'Flaherty (bass guitar) (born 8 May 1944, in Gosport, Hampshire), Eric Hine (keyboards) (born Eric Raymond Lewis Hines, 4 September 1944, in Portsmouth, Hampshire), and Tony Ransley (drums) (born Anthony John Ransley, 17 May 1944, in Portsmouth, Hampshire). Those early group names aside, their repertory was focused a lot more on the songs of Wilson Pickett, Don Covay, and Otis Redding, than on Howlin' Wolf or Bo Diddley. 'Simon Dupree and the Big Sound' came about in the course of their search for a flashy name.

The group were signed to EMI's Parlophone label, under producer Dave Paramor. Their first few singles, including "I See The Light" (1966), failed to chart, then in October 1967, the group's management and their record label decided to try moving Simon Dupree and the Big Sound in the direction of psychedelia.

They broke through at the end of 1967 with the psychedelic "Kites", a Top 10 hit in the UK Singles Chart. Regarding themselves as blue-eyed soul brothers, they hated it as it was so unrepresentative of their usual style. The follow-up, "For Whom The Bell Tolls", was only a minor hit, and a subsequent single "Broken Hearted Pirates", featuring an uncredited Dudley Moore on piano, made no headway at all.

A then unknown keyboard player by the name of Reginald Dwight was hired to fill in for an ill Eric Hine and he joined them on a 1967 tour in Scotland. They were asked to allow him to stay on, and he was almost recruited as a permanent member. They politely rejected the chance to record any of his compositions (although they did ultimately record "I'm Going Home" as the B-side of their final (contractually obligated) single), and were amused when he told them he was adopting the stage name of Elton John.

The group released one studio album; Without Reservations, on Parlophone Records (1967), and a compilation Amen (1980). A more recent set, Part of My Past (2004), includes all their singles, album tracks and previously unreleased material prepared for their second album, release of which was cancelled at the time.

In November 1968, they released a single "We Are The Moles (Part 1)/(Part 2)" under the moniker The Moles; by this point, Martin Smith had replaced Ransley on drums. Released on the Parlophone label, the single did not give any hint of the identity of the artists, with both songs credited as written, performed and produced by The Moles. Rumours spread that it was an obscure release by The Beatles, who also were under contract at Parlophone, with Ringo Starr on lead vocals.

Frustrated as being seen as one-hit wonders being pushed by their record label as a pop group rather than the soul band they had always intended to be, they disbanded in 1969 and the Shulman brothers went on, along with Martin Smith, to form the progressive rock group Gentle Giant.

== Discography ==
=== Albums ===
- Without Reservations (June 1967 Parlophone PMC 7029 or PCS 7029) – UK No. 39

=== Compilations ===
- Kites (also known as 'Amen') (compilation album: 1982, See for Miles/Charly CM 109)
- Part of My Past (compilation album: March 2004)

=== Singles ===
- "I See the Light" / "It Is Finished" (2 December 1966 Parlophone R 5542) – UK No.53 (Note: Chart position is from the official UK "Breakers List".)
- "Reservations" / "You Need a Man" (24 February 1967 Parlophone R 5574) – UK No.54
- "Day Time, Night Time" / "I've Seen It All Before" (5 May 1967 Parlophone R 5594) – UK No.58
- "Kites" / "Like the Sun Like the Fire" (27 October 1967 Parlophone R 5646) – UK No.9
- "For Whom the Bell Tolls" / "Sleep" (8 March 1968 Parlophone R 5670) – UK No.43
- "Part of My Past" / "This Story Never Ends" (27 May 1968 Parlophone R 5697) – UK No.62
- "Thinking About My Life" / "Velvet and Lace" (20 September 1968 Parlophone R 5727)
- "We Are the Moles, Part 1" / "We Are the Moles, Part 2" (15 November 1968, Parlophone R 5743, as The Moles)
- "Broken Hearted Pirates" / "She Gave Me the Sun" (7 February 1969 Parlophone R 5757)
- "The Eagle Flies Tonight" / "Give It All Back" (14 November 1969 Parlophone R 5816)

== See also ==
- List of performances on Top of the Pops
