= Phil Shulman =

- Born: 27 August 1937 (age 88); Gorbals, Glasgow, Scotland, U.K.
- Genres: Progressive rock
- Occupation: Musician
- Instruments: Saxophone; clarinet; trumpet; mellophone; recorder; piano; percussion; vocals
- Formerly of: Simon Dupree and the Big Sound; Gentle Giant

Philip Arthur Shulman (born 27 August 1937, in The Gorbals, Glasgow, Scotland), is a Scottish musician who was a member of the progressive rock group Gentle Giant from 1970 to 1973.

== Career ==
The eldest brother of Derek and Ray Shulman, the three brothers were members of the sixties psychedelic group Simon Dupree and the Big Sound, who scored a 1967 hit with Kites. In 1970, Simon Dupree and the Big Sound formed the seminal progressive rock group Gentle Giant.

During his time in Gentle Giant, he performed on their albums Gentle Giant, Acquiring the Taste, Three Friends, and Octopus. Shulman left Gentle Giant in 1973.
