= Gentle Giant =

British progressive rock band (1970–1980)

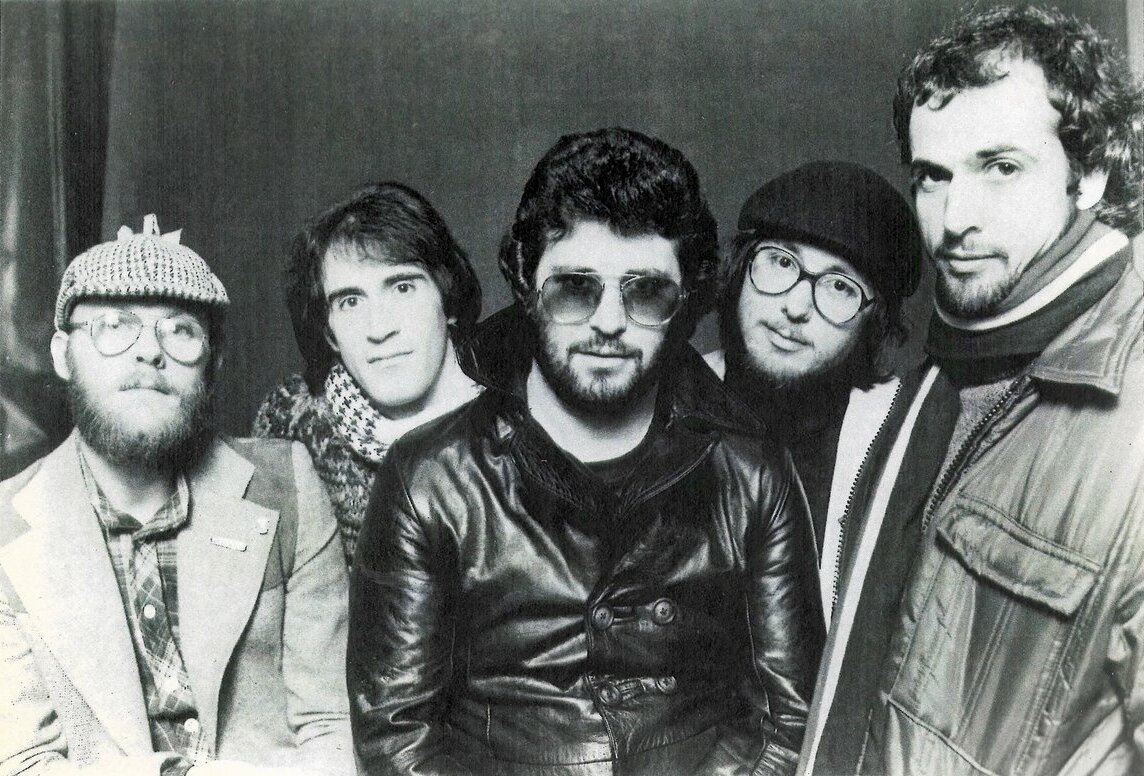
- (l-r): John Weathers, Ray Shulman, Derek Shulman, Gary Green and Kerry Minnear, in 1977

Background information
- Origin: Portsmouth, England
- Genres: Progressive rock
- Years active: 1970–1980
- Labels: Chrysalis (UK), Vertigo (UK, US), Columbia (US), Capitol (US), One Way Records, Alucard Music, DRT Entertainment, Major League Productions (MLP), Road Goes On Forever (UK), Terrapin Trucking (UK)
- Past members: Gary Green; Kerry Minnear; Derek Shulman; Phil Shulman; Ray Shulman; Martin Smith; Malcolm Mortimore; John Weathers
- Website: gentlegiantband.com gentlegiantmusic.com

Gentle Giant were a British progressive rock band active between 1970 and 1980. They were known for the complexity and sophistication of their music and for the varied musical skills of the members. All of the band members were multi-instrumentalists. Although not commercially successful, the band achieved a cult following.

The band stated that their aim was to "expand the frontiers of contemporary popular music at the risk of becoming very unpopular", although this stance was to alter significantly with time.

Gentle Giant's music was considered complex even by progressive rock standards, drawing on a broad swathe of music including folk, soul, jazz, and classical music. Unlike many of their progressive rock contemporaries, their "classical" influences ranged beyond the Romantic and incorporated medieval, baroque, and modernist chamber music elements. The band also had a taste for broad themes for their lyrics, drawing inspiration not only from personal experiences but from philosophy and the works of François Rabelais and R. D. Laing. In 2015 they were recognised with the lifetime achievement award at the Progressive Music Awards.

== Band history ==
=== Prehistory (including Simon Dupree and the Big Sound) ===
The core of what was to become Gentle Giant comprised three brothers: Phil Shulman (born 1937), Derek Shulman (born 1947) and Ray Shulman (1949–2023). The brothers were of Scottish-Jewish descent. Phil and Derek were born in the Gorbals, which was then a notorious slum area of Glasgow, Scotland. The family moved to Portsmouth, England, where Ray was born. Their father was an army musician turned jazz trumpeter, who continued his musical work in Portsmouth. He encouraged his sons to learn various instruments; and Phil, Derek, and Ray all became multi-instrumentalists. During the early 1960s, Derek and Ray became interested in playing rhythm-and-blues and formed a band together. Phil – originally acting as a manager figure in order to look after his much younger brothers – eventually became a band member himself.

[It was a] house full of musicians and instruments... I started learning trumpet when I was five just because it was there and then took up violin when I was seven. We were made to practise for an hour a day at least, when we really wanted to go out and play. ... Eventually I wanted to do it anyway... I wasn't formally taught at all.

— Ray Shulman on the musical upbringing of the Shulman brothers

By 1966, the Shulmans' band – initially called the Howling Wolves, then the Road Runners – had taken on the name of Simon Dupree and the Big Sound and were pursuing more of a soul/pop direction. As lead singer and frontman, Derek Shulman took on the 'Simon Dupree' pseudonym while Phil played saxophone and trumpet, and youngest brother Ray played guitar and violin. (Both Ray and Phil also played trumpet and sang backing vocals for the group which, during its lifetime, briefly featured the future Elton John as pianist as well as recording a single with Dudley Moore as guest). Signing to the EMI record label, Simon Dupree and the Big Sound produced several non-charting singles before being pushed by their management and label in the direction of psychedelia. This resulted in the UK Top 10 hit "Kites" in the autumn of 1967 (and the release of the Without Reservation album later in the year).

Success only served to frustrate the Shulman brothers, who considered themselves to be blue-eyed soul singers and felt that their change of style was insincere and insubstantial. Derek Shulman was later to describe "Kites" as "utter shit". The Shulmans' opinion was confirmed, in their eyes, by the successive failure of follow-up singles to "Kites". Attempting to escape their new image, they released a pseudonymous double A-side single in late 1968 as the Moles – "We Are the Moles (parts 1 & 2)". This compounded their identity crisis as the single was subsequently caught up in a rumour that the Moles were, in fact, the Beatles recording under a different name and with Ringo Starr as lead singer. The rumour was eventually debunked by Pink Floyd leader Syd Barrett, who outed Simon Dupree and the Big Sound as the band behind the record.

In 1969, the Shulman brothers finally dissolved the group in order to escape the pop music environment that had frustrated them. They did not return directly to rhythm and blues or soul, but instead chose to pursue a more complicated direction. Ray Shulman later stated, "We knew we couldn't continue with the musicians we'd had before. We weren't interested in the other musicians in the band — they couldn't contribute anything. We had to teach them what to do. It got rather heavy when we could play drums better than the drummer, and even on record we were doing more and more of it with overdubs. It got stupid having a band like (that). The first thing was to get some musicians of a higher standard."

=== Formation of Gentle Giant ===
Gentle Giant was formed in 1970 when the Shulman brothers teamed up with two other multi-instrumentalists, Gary Green (guitar, mandolin, recorder etc.) and Kerry Minnear (keyboards, vibraphone, cello, etc.), plus drummer Martin Smith, who had previously drummed for Simon Dupree and the Big Sound. The classically trained Minnear had recently graduated from the Royal College of Music with a degree in composition, and had played with the band Rust. Green was essentially a blues player and had never worked with a band above the semi-professional level, but adapted readily to the demanding music of the new band. The Shulman brothers, meanwhile, settled into typically multi-instrumental roles of their own — Derek on saxophone and recorder; Ray on bass and violin; and Phil on saxophone, trumpet, and clarinet (with all three brothers playing other instruments as and when required).

It was like this big funnel, really. We all had these varied influences, whether it be pop, classical, rock, jazz, or whatever, and we just came together and created what we did. A lot of the bands who were doing prog rock back then were doing long songs that in many cases were just filler, but we never tried to impress anyone with our talents, maybe we were just trying to impress each other! What to us just seemed like some clever songs really touched a lot of people it seems, which never fails to amaze me.

— Derek Shulman on Gentle Giant's writing approach

The new band also featured three lead vocalists. Derek Shulman sang in a tough rhythm-and-blues style and generally handled the more rock-oriented vocals; Phil Shulman handled the more folk-or-jazz-influenced songs; and Kerry Minnear (who had a particularly delicate voice) sang the lighter folk and chamber-classical lead vocals. Minnear did not sing lead vocals at live concerts, because of his inability to support and project his voice at a level suitable for live amplification (Derek and Phil Shulman handled Minnear's lead vocal parts when the band played live).

According to a booklet that was included in their first album, the band's name was a reference to a fictional character, a "gentle giant" that happens upon a band of musicians and is enthralled with their music. The character is reminiscent of those from the Renaissance tales of François Rabelais.

From the start, Gentle Giant was a particularly flexible band because of the exceptionally broad musical skills of its members. One Gentle Giant album would list a total of forty-six instruments in the musician credits — all of which had been played by group members — and five of the six members sang, enabling the band to write and perform detailed vocal harmony and counterpoint. The band's approach to songwriting was equally diverse, blending a wide variety of ideas and influences whether they were considered commercial or otherwise.

=== Early Gentle Giant: the debut album, Acquiring the Taste and Three Friends ===
The band's first album was the self-titled Gentle Giant in 1970, produced by Tony Visconti. Combining the collective band members' influences of rock, blues, classical, and 1960s British soul, it was an immediately challenging effort, although it has sometimes been criticised for having a slightly disappointing recording quality.

Gentle Giant was followed in 1971 by Acquiring the Taste. This second album showcased a band who were developing rapidly. Far more experimental and dissonant than its predecessor, Acquiring the Taste was shaped primarily by Kerry Minnear's broad classical and contemporary classical music training. It also showed the band expanding their instrumental palette (although many years later Derek Shulman would admit "we recorded [Acquiring the Taste] without any idea of what it would be like before we got into the studio. It was a very experimental album and we still didn't have an ultimate direction".)" The band's sense of challenge was made evident in the liner notes to Acquiring the Taste, which contained a particularly lofty statement of intent even by progressive rock standards. Producer Tony Visconti has claimed authorship of this liner note as well as the "giant" story accompanying the first album.

After Acquiring the Taste, Martin Smith left the band, apparently because of disagreements with both Ray and Phil Shulman. He was replaced by Malcolm Mortimore.

Gentle Giant's next recording was Three Friends (1972). This was the band's first concept album, and was based around the theme of three boys who are "inevitably separated by chance, skill, and fate" as they become men. Over the course of the album, the three friends travel on from being childhood schoolfriends to becoming, respectively, a road digger, an artist, and a white-collar worker. In the process, they lose their ability to relate to each other or understand each other's lifestyles. The development and fate of each character is musically represented by separate yet integrated styles, from hard rhythm-and-blues-edged rock to symphonic classical stylings.

In March 1972, Malcolm Mortimore injured himself in a motorcycle accident. To fulfil tour obligations in April, Gentle Giant hired John "Pugwash" Weathers (born 7 February 1947) (ex-Grease Band/Wild Turkey/Graham Bond's Magic). Weathers was a harder-hitting player who also sang and played melodic percussion and guitar, further expanding Gentle Giant's instrumental performance options. Because of Mortimore's extended convalescence, the band opted to formally replace him with Weathers at the end of the 1972 April tour.

=== Octopus and the departure of Phil Shulman ===
At a show at the Hollywood Bowl in Los Angeles, we went on stage and the Sabbath fans were shouting “get off, we want Sabbath” and we were just getting set to play ‘Funny Ways’. We pulled out the cellos and violins, and the crowd starting heckling immediately, but we were gradually starting to get past it, when someone threw a cherry bomb on stage. [Phil Shulman] made sure we all stopped playing and said we needed to get off the stage. As we were leaving the stage, Phil grabbed the mic and said to the crowd, “You guys are a bunch of fucking cunts!”, and the boo that went up after that was enormous! To this day I'll never forget it! We were sort of vindicated later on, as we thought we were never going to play Los Angeles again after the cherry bomb incident, but later on the Octopus tour we were able to sell out consistently there, so something clicked with the fans.

— Derek Shulman on Gentle Giant's failure to win over Black Sabbath's audience on 15 September 1972

The new line-up of Gentle Giant released the Octopus album later in 1972. The band's hardest-rocking album to date, Octopus was allegedly titled by Phil Shulman's wife Roberta as a pun on "octo opus" (eight musical works, reflecting the album's eight tracks). It maintained Gentle Giant's distinctively broad and challengingly integrated style, one of the highlights being the intricate madrigal-styled vocal workout "Knots" (whose lyrics are taken from various verses of poetry from R. D. Laing's book of the same title).

The release of Octopus is generally considered to herald the start of Gentle Giant's peak period. In 2004, Ray Shulman commented "[Octopus] was probably our best album, with the exception perhaps of Acquiring the Taste. We started with the idea of writing a song about each member of the band. Having a concept in mind was a good starting point for writing. I don't know why, but despite the impact of the Who's Tommy and Quadrophenia, almost overnight concept albums were suddenly perceived as rather naff and pretentious."

Before embarking on the Octopus tour, the band played a gruelling set of dates supporting Black Sabbath, during which they proved to be very unpopular with the majority of the headlining band's fans. Derek Shulman recalled, "It was perhaps the most ridiculous pairing of groups ever in the history of show business. For the most part we got booed off the stage". Following the tour, Gentle Giant underwent their most significant line-up change when a burnt-out and discouraged Phil Shulman left the band following disagreements with his brothers. Derek Shulman took over all lead vocals for live concerts, becoming Gentle Giant's de facto lead singer (although Kerry Minnear continued to sing his own share of lead vocals on records).

Growing up, family, two sons, lovely little daughter, a wife who was getting lonelier and lonelier… No decision really, it was a foregone conclusion. My brothers, in fact, quite frankly wouldn't speak to me for years afterwards because I said, "That's it, I'm going. I've got to go back to my family and I've got to go back and be a normal man...." I'm not saying how important (or not important) I was to the group, or anything like that, but my brothers thought that that was the end of the band. And that's absurd. When five-sixths of the band are still there, [and] I go - no trouble. And they did: they carried on for seven more years, folks, and that was touring the world and getting great acclaim as a very fine five-piece outfit. But for me it was the only thing to do. It obviously took something away because I wasn't able to listen to music for a few years afterwards.

— Phil Shulman on his reasons for leaving Gentle Giant, 2008

Gary Green later recalled "As I remember it, when Phil announced it at the end of an Italian tour, he said he would leave the band. He couldn't continue on. There was too much stress being on the road and the family. Plus the brothers were having a bit of a difficult time. They're brothers and they argued like hell, sometimes to the point where you thought they were going to hit each other. But I guess it was brotherly love [laughs]. But when Phil said he was going to leave, we were all like stumped, 'Oh! What are we going to do? All right we'll buy a Moog synthesizer!' That's kind of trite; I don't mean it quite like that. We had to do something".

"John [Weathers] and I really pushed for the band to continue at that point because it looked like we were going to fold. And that seemed just ludicrous – I mean we had Kerry at full strength and Ray writing great. We were really strong live and we were about to get stronger. I think we became a stronger band after Phil left. And that's nothing against Phil. We had just been just hitting our stride as players".

Over thirty years later, Phil Shulman expanded on his reasons for departure in a 2008 podcast interview conducted by his son Damon and grandson Elliot. In the interview he stated that his main motivation for leaving was because he had realised that the lifestyle of a touring musician was damaging his family life. The two factions of Shulman brothers - with Phil on one side and Ray and Derek on the other would eventually resolve their differences and heal their relationship, although Phil never rejoined the band or returned to music as a career. Ray Shulman has subsequently assisted Phil's son Damon Shulman with his own music.

=== In a Glass House and The Power and the Glory ===
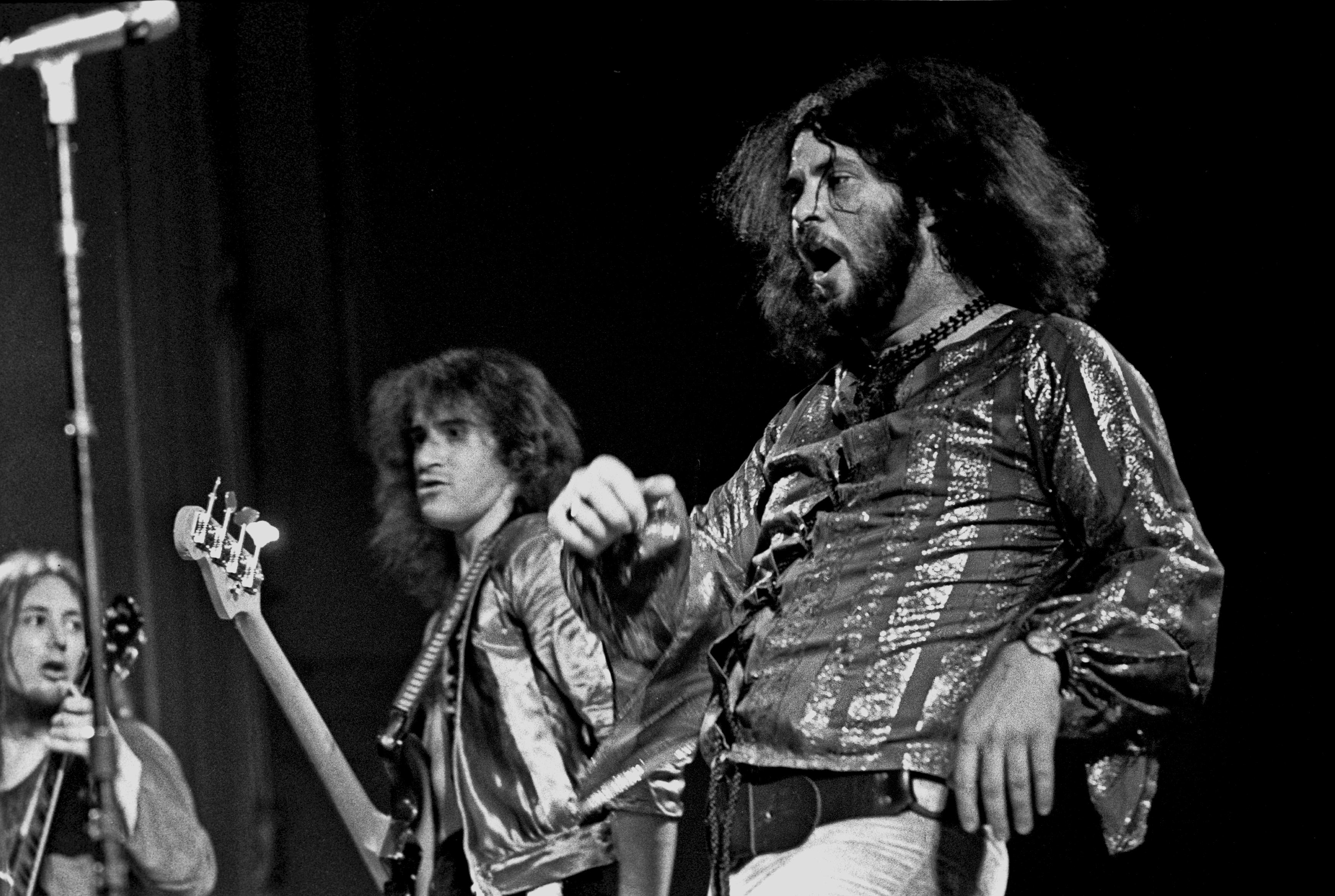
Gentle Giant at the Musikhalle, Hamburg, April 1974

The remaining quintet regrouped to record the harder-rocking In a Glass House, which was released in 1973. They played their first gig as a five-piece at King Alfred's College, Winchester. In a Glass House is a complex and determined concept album - named after the aphorism that "people who live in glass houses shouldn't throw stones"—it was the band's most directly psychological effort to date. The album was also notable for its three-dimensional cover, using a cellophane overlay (replicated using the CD jewel case on the Terrapin CD reissue, and via a custom digipak for the later Alucard CD reissue). In a Glass House was never released in the US, but was in great demand as an import.

The Power and the Glory followed in 1974. This was Gentle Giant's third concept album, this time taking power and corruption as the linking theme. The band also wrote a separate single with the same title which was later added to CD reissues of the album.

=== The Chrysalis years, part 1: Free Hand, Interview and Playing the Fool ===
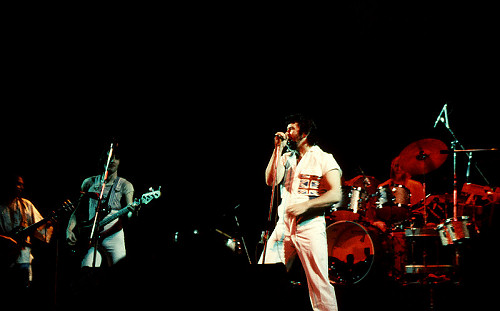
Gentle Giant at the Chateau Neuf, Oslo, September 1976

Dissatisfied with their deal with WWA, Gentle Giant signed a new deal with Chrysalis Records, with whom they would stay for the rest of their career. Although the band were still writing and performing some of the most complex rock music of the period, it was at this point that they began to polish and slightly simplify their songs for accessibility, in order to reach a wider audience (in particular an American one). Their efforts seemed successful enough to get 1975's Free Hand into the Top 50 of the album chart in the USA. Strongly influenced by the music of the Renaissance and Middle Ages as well as jazz-rock the album's songs reflected on lost love and damaged relationships, including the breakdown of the band's relationship with their former manager. It became one of the band's most popular and accessible releases.

Gentle Giant's next release was 1976's Interview - another concept album, this time based around an imaginary interview with the band. The music pointedly poked fun at the state of the music industry and at the silly questions that rock stars are repeatedly asked in order to project an image for marketing. Ironically, this more satirical and subversive approach ultimately proved to be a symptom of the undermining of the band's work and artistic integrity. Derek Shulman later admitted, "I think Interview was the start of the erosion. I think the creative juices were starting to wane a little bit... I think Interview was the start of the slide towards the realization that this is a business now, and that's also a part of what the business had become. I was managing the band at the time and music business became a major business"." Despite this approach, the album did not repeat its predecessor's American chart success, peaking at No. 137.

By this time, Gentle Giant had established themselves as a prominent live act in both America and Europe, touring extensively and appearing alongside artists ranging from Sha Na Na to progressive rock contemporaries such as Jethro Tull and Yes. Their live performances, which featured frequent instrument changes between band members and rearranged versions of their studio material, were noted for their technical complexity. A 1975 concert at Detroit's Cobo Hall saw them perform on the same bill as Gary Wright who was debuting his Dream Weaver album) and Rick Wakeman, who was headlining with the touring production of The Myths and Legends of King Arthur and the Knights of the Round Table). In 1976, this aspect of the band's work was documented on the live album Playing the Fool - The Official Live, recorded during the European tour for Interview.

=== The Chrysalis years, part 2: The Missing Piece and Giant for a Day! ===
Gentle Giant in 1977

Affected by changes in popular style (including the growth of punk rock), the band made a mutual decision to refine their writing and performance style in pursuit of a broader market, particularly in America. Over the next two years, the band gradually jettisoned many of their complicated stylings in order to attempt to write simpler pop music and attempt to create hit singles.

The Missing Piece (recorded in the Netherlands and released in 1977) was a transitional album reflecting this new approach. While the second side featured longer and more eclectic songs reminiscent of the band's earlier work, the first side featured outright examples of pop-rock, blue-eyed soul and even an attempt at punk. Three singles ("Two Weeks in Spain", "Mountain Time" and "I'm Turning Around") were released from the album, but failed to become hits: the album itself performed disappointingly in the marketplace, failing to win new fans or find favour with the band's existing fanbase.

Despite this setback, the band pursued their course to its conclusion on 1978's Giant for a Day! on which all former progressive rock stylings were purged in favour of radio-friendly soft rock and further (unsuccessful) attempts at creating hit singles. In order to present a more straightforward group identity, Derek Shulman now handled all lead vocals and the band abandoned their conventional battery of string instruments, wind instruments, tuned percussion and vocal interplay in favour of a straightforward guitar/bass/keyboards/drums/lead singer set-up. Giant for a Day! was another poor seller, later adjudged by the band as being a creative mistake. Derek Shulman eventually remembered it as being "real contrived" while Kerry Minnear would confess to having felt unsure as to whether he had anything to contribute to the album (although he did make an attempt to write a commercial single, "It's Only Goodbye").

=== The Chrysalis years, part 3: Civilian ===
In 1979, Gentle Giant relocated their centre of operations to Los Angeles in order to record their eleventh album, Civilian. This was a record of short rock songs with a strong new wave influence. While keeping the reduced instrumental approach of Giant for a Day!, the band allowed themselves far more freedom of arrangement and vocal work than they had for the previous album, and despite its relative simplicity the songwriting and execution were more reminiscent of earlier Gentle Giant work.

While Kerry Minnear would pronounce himself far more satisfied with this album and its songs, Ray Shulman would eventually state, "I hated making [that] last record, I hated being involved with it". In 2005, Derek Shulman reflected, "Civilian was done with less passion than some of the other albums. As it turns out we as a band were just not good at being rock or pop stars. We would have loved to be as popular as a Genesis or Rush or Yes. In hindsight, I sometimes think that Gentle Giant was wrongfully put into the progressive rock category. Much of what we did was very clever, but we certainly didn't do these long complex tunes like Yes or Genesis did".

=== Split ===
We had a meeting in New York when we started the tour over here. We met in New York to get together and see it as a launch-off place. Kind of had a talk about what we were going to do. At that meeting Kerry and Derek said this was going to be the last tour and they didn't want to be on the road anymore. And you understand it; they had families. Kerry had just had a baby and Derek was just getting married. But having said that, I was married and so was John. You can change things like that; there are ways to work around that. You don't have to tour. I don't think we really toured an awful lot as Giant. I think we could have worked a lot harder at touring. We toured perhaps five or six months of the year. The rest of the year we didn't tour, which seemed a bit silly if you really want to make it or break the market. So let's go ahead and do it and capitalize on this rush we got. So it all seemed a little odd to me. It was sad.

— Gary Green reflects on the final Gentle Giant split

In the summer of 1980, the group disbanded. In 2005, Derek Shulman recalled that "the creative juices just weren't flowing. I was living in Los Angeles at the time when we broke up. We weren't really sure what direction to take. I don't regret the decision we made to disband, and I'd do it again if we were to do the whole thing all over again". Ray Shulman has commented: "There was definitely the decision that the last tour would be the last tour. Once we knew that, we enjoyed ourselves. We decided to quit then rather than let it go on too long"." In an interview with Mojo in 2000, Kerry Minnear asserted that the split "wasn't because of punk; it was because we had lost our way musically".

Gary Green's opinion of the split differs. In 2003 he commented: "My own personal opinion is that the band broke up because Derek really wanted a hit album, and I think Ray did too, and they were fed up. They had been musicians longer than I had, and they had tasted it pretty good when they were with Simon Dupree, at least in Britain. And they were looking for some of that in Giant too. My feeling is that we could have continued on as PFM did, or Yes, and still continue. If we had adhered to the statement we started out with, we could still be playing that, and still be earning a reasonable living. That's all water under the bridge and that's fine now. It seemed a bit silly to cut off your creativity for that kind of thing".

Gentle Giant played their last gig at the Roxy Theatre in West Hollywood, California on 16 June 1980.

=== Post-split ===
Following the dissolution of the band, Derek Shulman went on to a successful career in the organisational side of the music business (initially promotion and artist development for PolyGram, followed by A&R at Mercury Records, becoming president of Atco Records, after which he became President of Roadrunner Records. He is now the owner of new music company 2Plus Music & Entertainment).

Ray Shulman moved into soundtrack work for television and advertising before becoming a successful record producer (working with, among others, Echo & the Bunnymen, the Sundays, and the Sugarcubes). He wrote soundtracks for computer games, as well as producing DVDs for artists such as Genesis and Queen. He died on 30 March 2023.

John Weathers went on to drum for Man (an association that lasted until 1996) and later played in Glenn Cornick's Wild Turkey. Gary Green (having settled in America, near Chicago) went on to play with various Illinois bands (including Blind Dates, the Elvis Brothers, Big Hello, and Mother Tongue) and guest on recordings and at concerts by Eddie Jobson and Divae. Gary also played guitar on the album Deeper Imaginings by Paul Adams and Australian Elizabeth Geyer that was nominated best New Age album of 2019 by the Independent Music Awards. Kerry Minnear returned to the UK and settled in Cornwall, spending many years working in gospel music. He now runs Alucard Music, the organization supervising the legal and royalty issues regarding Gentle Giant's music.

Following his time in Gentle Giant, Phil Shulman retired entirely from the music business. He subsequently worked as a teacher, in retail, and ran a gift shop in Gosport, Hampshire, UK before his retirement. He was briefly in a band with his son Damon Shulman and recorded several pieces with him. Several of these (under the collective title of Then) were spoken-word pieces in which he reminisced about his upbringing in the Glasgow slums. One of these pieces, "Rats", appeared on Damon Shulman's solo album In Pieces (2003) and can be heard as an audio stream on Damon Shulman's homepage and MySpace page (made available in April 2008).

Original Gentle Giant drummer Martin Smith settled in Southampton and drummed with various bands there – he died on 2 March 1997. Second Gentle Giant drummer Malcolm Mortimore has continued to work as a successful sessions drummer in the rock, jazz, and theatre fields.

=== Reunions ===
Despite having seen many of their progressive rock contemporaries reunite for tours, Gentle Giant are notable for having consistently refused to reunite as a full band. In 1997, the Gentle Giant fanbase unsuccessfully attempted to persuade the members to perform a reunion concert. Reasons cited by members for their rejection include busy schedules, health problems, lack of practice on instruments, and other personal reasons. Asked about a possible reunion in 1995, Phil Shulman replied: "We lead such disparate lives now and different lifestyles, different attitudes... I think it's impossible".

There have been two collaborative efforts featuring between two and four of the band members, neither of which has been identified as a formal reunion of Gentle Giant. The first was a collaboration between four former Gentle Giant members – Kerry Minnear, John Weathers, Gary Green, and Phil Shulman (who only participated as a lyricist). This group recorded three new songs based on old Kerry Minnear demos for the 2004 Scraping the Barrel box set ("Home Again", "Moog Fugue", and "Move Over"). The band members recorded their parts separately and never reunited in person.

In 2008, a partial reunion of Gentle Giant involved the creation of a new band called Rentle Giant, in order to play Gentle Giant material. This band featured former members guitarist Gary Green and drummer Malcolm Mortimore. They recruited three noted jazz-fusion musicians to complete the band, with Roger Carey on bass and vocals, Andy Williams on guitar, and John Donaldson on piano and keyboards. Green contributed lead vocals to some of the songs.

In March 2009, Green and Mortimore were joined by a third Gentle Giant member in the form of Kerry Minnear and Rentle Giant consequently changed its name to Three Friends. Also at this time, the band recruited vocalist Mick Wilson as dedicated lead singer. After a short tour, it was announced that Minnear was leaving the band for personal reasons, and that Three Friends planned to continue as a six-piece. In due course, by 2011, Carey, Williams and Donaldson had left the band, to be replaced by Lee Pomeroy on bass and Gary Sanctuary on keyboards. Charlotte Glasson joined in 2012, adding violin, baritone sax, alto sax and recorder, enabling the band to create a live sound closer to the original recordings. This line-up toured Italy, Canada and the United States in 2012. In 2015, the band consisted of Green, Mortimore, Glasson, Neil Angilley and Jonathan Noyce. They have not performed live since then.

A fan video of "Proclamation" was posted on YouTube on 15 July 2020. The video featured appearances from Gentle Giant members Gary Green, Kerry Minnear, Derek Shulman, Ray Shulman (his last band-related appearance before his death), Phil Shulman, John Weathers and Malcolm Mortimore. Additional musicians included Jakko Jakszyk, Billy Sherwood, Yes/Steve Hackett bassist Lee Pomeroy, Rachel Flowers, Dan Reed (Dan Reed Network), Richard Hilton (Chic) and Mikey Heppner (Priestess) among others. The video was directed and edited by Noah Shulman and mixed by his uncle Ray.

== Reissues ==
There has been renewed interest in Gentle Giant since 1990, with new fan clubs, new releases of live concerts and previously unreleased material, and several tribute albums. The rights of the band's catalogue are scattered among many companies, not all of which are keen on re-releasing the albums properly. In particular, the first four albums have yet to receive definitive CD releases. For example, the title track on Acquiring the Taste begins with an obvious defect, possibly from a damaged master tape, on all current CD and vinyl releases. The 1996 compilation Edge of Twilight includes a corrected version of the song. Conflicting evidence sometimes reports that this defect exists on the original 1971 vinyl release of the album, with the opening note bending up as the tape comes up to speed – probably an engineering error.

In July 2004, the first eponymous album was re-released by Repertoire; in December 2005, they released Acquiring the Taste; in December 2006, Octopus in a mini-sleeve with the original design of Roger Dean was released, and in December 2007, German label Repertoire released Three Friends in a mini-sleeve with the original British release design. Although not widely distributed, these re-issues have been praised for their production quality and remastering. Before that, all first four albums have been re-released on Universal Japan label.

In 2005, to celebrate the band's 35th anniversary, a series of digitally remastered and specially packaged CDs of their later albums were released by Derek Shulman's company, DRT Entertainment. They all featured unreleased live tracks (of varying quality) as bonuses. Many of these albums (most notably In a Glass House) were previously difficult to purchase in North America without resorting to imports. The re-released albums are: In a Glass House, The Power and the Glory, Free Hand, Interview, The Missing Piece, the live album Playing the Fool, and Giant for a Day.

A reissue series on CD and, with bonus tracks, as digital downloads was begun in 2009/2010. In a 2009 interview Derek Shulman also indicated that plans were in the works to put out an animated film based on The Power and the Glory (this has yet to come to fruition). In 2011 the original mastertapes for Three Friends and Octopus were located and Alucard Music reissued each album with a bonus live performance of material from each respective album. Each album was remastered by Ray Shulman and Francis Kervorkian (both of whom worked on the 2009 remasters).

Free Hand and Interview both get re-issued in 2012 on CD/DVD & Vinyl. The CD/DVD features a previously unreleased lost quadraphonic mix. The special 4.1 Surround Sound mix (audiophiles note it's DTS 96/24 and Dolby Digital 48 kHz/24bit) has been adapted from the original Quad mixes. The band members have written new sleevenotes for both albums.

2012's I Lost My Head - The Chrysalis Years is a 4-CD set rounding up all of Gentle Giant's Chrysalis albums with bonus tracks including John Peel sessions, 7" mixes, live tracks & 'b' sides etc.

In 2014, The Power and the Glory was re-released as a CD/DVD set with new mixes by Steven Wilson (of Porcupine Tree) from the multitrack masters. The DVD contains new 48 kHz/24-bit Stereo LPCM, DTS 96 kHz/24-bit 5.1, and Dolby AC3 5.1 mixes, as well as a 96 kHz/24-bit LPCM transfer of the original 1974 studio mix.

In 2017, Three Piece Suite was released, and focused on tracks from their first three albums (Gentle Giant, Acquiring the Taste, and Three Friends). These tracks were re-mixed by Steven Wilson from the available multi-track tapes. Some songs from the first three albums were not included in the set as the multi-tracks for those specific songs have been lost. The set was available as a CD of the re-mixed songs and a Blu-Ray disk. The Blu-ray disk had 96/24 Stereo LPCM and DTS-HD 5.1 Surround Sound versions of the re-mixed tracks, additional bonus tracks, instrumental versions of some tracks, and Original Album Mixes from Flat Transfers of Mint Condition Original LPs. There were also new video animations included on the 5.1 Surround tracks. This release came packaged as a single Digipack with the two disks, a 16-page booklet, new artwork and was approved by the band for release.

Their final album, Civilian, was scheduled to be reissued on CD and available to stream on 20 May 2022.

== Musical style ==
Gentle Giant's music was mostly composed by Kerry Minnear and Ray Shulman, with additional musical ideas contributed by Derek Shulman (who was also known to contribute entire songs). Lyrics were mostly written by Phil Shulman and Derek Shulman (Kerry Minnear wrote some lyrics) up until Phil's departure following the release of Octopus (1972) – subsequent lyrics were mostly written by Derek Shulman, with help from Kerry Minnear. It shares several aspects with that of other progressive rock bands, including:

- multi-part vocal harmonies
- complex lyrics
- organisation into concept album form (on occasion)
- frequent changes in tempo
- frequent use of syncopation and non-standard time signatures, including polymeters (two or more different time signatures played simultaneously)
- use of complex melodies, frequently contrasting harmonies with dissonance
- extensive use of instrumental and vocal counterpoint
- use of musical structures typically associated with classical music (for example, madrigal form on "Knots", fugal exposition in "On Reflection", occasional Early Music stylings and the consistent use of stated, exchanged and recapitulated musical themes exchanged between instruments)
- use of classical, brass band and percussion-section instrumentation not generally associated with rock music

However, it has been noted that in spite of the comparatively complex initial sound, Gentle Giant's music is in fact fairly traditional in terms of harmony and features relatively few complex chords. In common with most 1970s progressive rock, Gentle Giant compositions are closer to early 20th century neoclassicism than to contemporary classical music (some Gentle Giant songs, such as "Black Cat", "Experience" and "So Sincere", do utilise more complicated modernist harmonics). In general, the band relied on sudden and unexpected compositional twists and turns to stimulate their audience, including:

- polyphony
- hocketing
- unusual chord progressions
- breaking up and tonally re-voicing patterns of initially simple chords (with the chords subtly altering from repetition to repetition)
- accelerating and decelerating duration of musical themes
- rapid and frequent key changes (sometimes within a single bar)
- division of vocal lines between different singers (including staggered rhythms)
- clever handling of transitions between sections (such as a hard-rock guitar riff being immediately substituted by a medieval choral)

== Personnel ==
=== Members ===
- Gary Green – guitar, mandolin, vocals, recorder, bass guitar, percussion (1970–1980)
- Kerry Minnear – keyboards, vocals, cello, vibraphone, xylophone, recorder, guitar, bass guitar, percussion (1970–1980)
- Derek Shulman – lead and backing vocals, saxophone, recorder, bass guitar, percussion, "Shulberry" (3-string custom electric ukulele) (1970–1980)
- Ray Shulman – bass guitar, violin, guitar, vocals, viola, trumpet, percussion, recorder (1970–1980; died 2023)
- Phil Shulman – backing and lead vocals, saxophone, trumpet, mellophone, clarinet, recorder, percussion (1970–1973)
- Martin Smith – drums, percussion (1970–1971; died 1997)
- Malcolm Mortimore – drums, percussion (1971–1972)
- John "Pugwash" Weathers – drums, percussion, vibraphone, xylophone, vocals, guitar (1972–1980)

=== Lineups ===
| February 1970 – October 1971 | October 1971 – March 1972 | March 1972 – January 1973 | January 1973 – June 1980 |
|---|---|---|---|
| Gary Green – guitar, mandolin, vocals; Kerry Minnear – keyboards, vocals, cello, vibraphone, xylophone, percussion; Derek Shulman – lead vocals, saxophone, bass guitar; Phil Shulman – lead vocals, saxophone, trumpet, recorder; Ray Shulman – bass guitar, violin, guitar, viola, vocals; Martin Smith – drums, percussion | Gary Green – guitar, mandolin, vocals; Kerry Minnear – keyboards, vocals, cello, vibraphone, xylophone, percussion; Derek Shulman – lead vocals, saxophone, bass guitar; Phil Shulman – lead vocals, saxophone, trumpet, recorder; Ray Shulman – bass guitar, violin, guitar, viola, vocals; Malcolm Mortimore – drums, percussion | Gary Green – guitar, mandolin, vocals; Kerry Minnear – keyboards, vocals, cello, vibraphone, xylophone, percussion; Derek Shulman – lead vocals, saxophone, bass guitar; Phil Shulman – lead vocals, saxophone, trumpet, recorder; Ray Shulman – bass guitar, violin, guitar, viola, vocals; John "Pugwash" Weathers – drums, percussion, vibraphone, xylophone, vocals | Gary Green – guitar, mandolin, recorder, vocals; Kerry Minnear – keyboards, vocals, cello, vibraphone, xylophone, recorder, percussion; Derek Shulman – lead vocals, saxophone, recorder, bass guitar, "Shulberry"; Ray Shulman – bass guitar, violin, guitar, viola, vocals; John "Pugwash" Weathers – drums, percussion, vibraphone, xylophone, vocals |

=== Member instrumentation ===
Table of Players & Instruments
| | Derek Shulman | Ray Shulman | Kerry Minnear | Gary Green | Phil Shulman | John Weathers | |
|---|---|---|---|---|---|---|---|
| Vocals | ✓ | ✓ | ✓ | ✓ | ✓ | ✓ | 6 |
| Guitars | | ✓ | ✓ | ✓ | | ✓ | 4 |
| Mandolin | | | | ✓ | | | 1 |
| Bass | ✓ | ✓ | ✓ | ✓ | | | 4 |
| Keyboards | ✓ | | ✓ | | ✓ | | 3 |
| Drums | ✓ | ✓ | ✓ | ✓ | | ✓ | 5 |
| Percussion | ✓ | ✓ | ✓ | ✓ | ✓ | ✓ | 6 |
| Glockenspiel | | | ✓ | ✓ | | ✓ | 3 |
| Xylophone | | | ✓ | | | ✓ | 2 |
| Vibraphone | | | ✓ | | | ✓ | 2 |
| Marimba | | | ✓ | | | | 1 |
| Theremin | | | ✓ | | | | 1 |
| Trumpet | | ✓ | | | ✓ | | 2 |
| Mellophone | | | | | ✓ | | 1 |
| Soprano saxophone | ✓ | | | | | | 1 |
| Alto saxophone | ✓ | | | | ✓ | | 2 |
| Tenor saxophone | ✓ | | | | ✓ | | 2 |
| Baritone saxophone | | | | | ✓ | | 1 |
| Clarinet | | | | | ✓ | | 1 |
| Recorder | ✓ | ✓ | ✓ | ✓ | ✓ | | 5 |
| Violin | | ✓ | | | | | 1 |
| Viola | | ✓ | | | | | 1 |
| Cello | | | ✓ | | | | 1 |
| | 9 | 9 | 13 | 8 | 10 | 7 | 56 |
Not shown in this table: Martin Smith, Malcolm Mortimore – drums, percussion.

== Discography ==
=== Studio albums ===
- Gentle Giant (1970)
- Acquiring the Taste (1971)
- Three Friends (1972)
- Octopus (1972)
- In a Glass House (1973)
- The Power and the Glory (1974)
- Free Hand (1975)
- Interview (1976)
- The Missing Piece (1977)
- Giant for a Day! (1978)
- Civilian (1980)

=== Live albums ===
- Playing the Fool - The Official Live (1977) Chrysalis, Capitol; recorded (au naturel) on European tour, September to October 1976
- In Concert (1994, recorded at the Golders Green Hippodrome, London, 5 January 1978)
- The Last Steps (1996, re-released in 2003, recorded at the Roxy Theatre, Los Angeles, 16 June 1980)
- Live on the King Biscuit Flower Hour (1998, recorded at the Academy of Music, New York City, 18 January 1975)
- In a Palesport House (1999, recorded at Palazzo dello Sport, Rome, 3 January 1973)
- Live Rome 1974 (2000, recorded at the PalaEur in Rome, Italy, 26 November 1974)
- In'terview in Concert (2000, recorded at Hempstead, New York, 3 July 1976)
- Endless Life (2002, recorded at Music Hall, White Plains, New York, 3 October 1975 and at Community Theatre, Berkeley, California, 28 October 1975)
- Prologue (2002, recorded at Halle Münsterland, Münster, Germany, 5 April 1974 and at the Spectrum, Philadelphia, Pennsylvania, 10 October 1975)
- Playing the Cleveland (2003, recorded at the Agora Ballroom, Cleveland, 27 January 1975 and at Academy of Music, New York City, 5 November 1975)
- Artistically Cryme (2003, recorded at Olympen, Lund, Sweden, 19 September 1976)
- The Missing Face (2003, recorded at the Ballroom, Cleveland, Ohio, November 1977)
- Live in Santa Monica 1975 (2005)
- Live in New York 1975 (2005, recorded at Music Hall, White Plains NY, 3 October 1975)
- GG at the GG - Sight And Sound In Concert (2006)
- Live in Stockholm '75 (2009, recorded at Club Kåren (Kårhuset), Stockholm University, 12 November 1975)
- King Alfred's College, Winchester 1971 (2009)
- Live at the Bicentennial (2014, recorded at Calderone Theatre, 3 July 1976; Hempstead, New York)

=== Compilation albums ===
- The Original Studio Gentle Giant - Vol. 1 (1974)
- The Original Studio Gentle Giant - Vol. 2 (1974)
- Giant Steps – The First Five Years (1976)
- Pretentious – For the Sake of It (1977)
- Circling Round the Gentle Giant (1981)
- Edge of Twilight (1996, 2CD)
- Out of the Woods: The BBC Sessions (1996)
- Champions of Rock (1996)
- Out of the Fire: The BBC Concerts (1998, 2CD)
- The Essential of Gentle Giant (1999)
- Totally out of the Woods: The BBC Sessions (2000, re-release of 'Out of the Woods' with bonus material)
- Way of Life (2003, 2CD)
- Giant on the Box (2004, CD/DVD)
- Three Piece Suite (2017, CD/Blu-Ray)

=== Boxsets ===
- Under Construction (1997, 2-CD boxset of unreleased material, demos, outtakes and odd live recordings)
- Scraping the Barrel (2004, 4-CD boxset of unreleased material, demos, outtakes and odd live recordings)
- I Lost My Head – The Chrysalis Years (2012, 4-CD boxset of all officially released albums from the period of 1975 to 1980 plus bonus material)
- Memories of Old Days (2013, 5-CD box, a compendium Of curios, bootlegs, live tracks, rehearsals and demos)
- Unburied Treasure (2019, 29CD/1 Blu-ray boxset of all 11 studio albums and 18 live albums)
- Front Row Center (2022, U.S. Dates 1976 - 1980, 10-LP set of live recordings, some previously unreleased, sourced from Gary Green's personal collection)

=== EPs ===
- Playing the Fool - Gentle Giant on Tour (1977)

=== UK singles ===
- "The Power and the Glory" / "Playing the Game" (1974)
- "I'm Turning Around" / "Just the Same" (1977)
- "Two Weeks in Spain" / "Free Hand" (1977)
- "Thank You" / "Spooky Boogie" (1978)
- "Words from the Wise" / "No Stranger" (1979)
- "The Power and the Glory" / "Proclamation - Live 1977" (2010)

=== Bootlegs ===
- Playing the Foole (A Stake in the Heart - The 1975 American Tour) recorded live on 18 January 1975, at the Academy Of Music in New York City. Released on The Amazing Kornyfone Record Label TAKRL 1943 in 1975. The record sleeve listed the venue as "Utland Communicable Concourse", which was false information.

The album achieved such fame, however, that the band decided to adopt the title for their official live double album Playing the Fool (omitting the final "e"), released two years later.

- Playing the Foole in Wonderland recorded live on 18 January 1975, at the Academy Of Music in New York City. Released on the Wizardo Records label WRMB 309 in September 1975. This release included an additional fake recording "March Of The Trolls", which the bootleggers had recorded themselves.
- Amongst the Darkers recorded live on 7 October 1975, at Ultra-Sonic Recording Studios, Hempstead, New York. Released on The Amazing Kornyfone Record Label TAKRL 1983 in 1975, following broadcast on WLIR Radio in New York City. TAKRL reissued the record again in 1976 with the same catalogue number using a revised title, Amongst the Darkers (Behind the Few - The 1975 American Tour).

== Alucard Music ==
Alucard Music
- Founder: Kerry Minnear, Lesley Minnear
- Distributor: Soulfood
- Genre: Progressive rock
- Country of origin: England
- Location: West Midlands

Alucard Music is a British music label that releases CDs and DVDs of Gentle Giant. It was founded by Kerry and Lesley Minnear.

=== CD releases ===
- Under Construction (1997, 2CD box set of unreleased material, demos, outtakes and odd live recordings)
- In a Glass House (1973 album, remastered CD in 2000)
- Scraping the Barrel (2004, 4CD box set of unreleased material, demos, outtakes and odd live recordings)

=== DVD releases ===
- Giant on the Box (2004)
- Giant on the Box – Deluxe Edition (DVD + CD, 2005)
- GG at the GG – Sight and Sound in Concert (DVD + CD, 2006)

== Filmography ==
- Giant on the Box (DVD, 2004)
- Giant on the Box – Deluxe Edition (DVD + CD, 2005)
- GG at the GG – Sight and Sound in Concert (DVD + CD, 2006)

== Literature ==
- Stone, Dominic (2016). Gentle Giant: The Missing Piece in Rock's Academia (PDF) (Thesis). Leeds: School of Music, University of Leeds.
- Neef, Martin (2019), Rock Music Lyrics as Postmodern Poetry: Gentle Giant Realization, Braunschweig: Technical University Braunschweig (Transcription of a lecture held in German language in 2005)
- Sivy, Robert Jacob (2016). Philippe Gonin (ed.). "Interwoven Patterns and Mutual Misunderstandings: Binding R.D. Laing's Psychology with Gentle Giant's Knots". Prog Rock in Europe: Overview of a Persistent Musical Style. Dijon: Éditions universitaires de Dijon: 131–143. ISBN 9782364411753. (Conference journal. Analysis of the song Knots of album Octopus)
- Sivy, Robert Jacob (2019). Exposing Corruption in Progressive Rock: A Semiotic Analysis of Gentle Giant's The Power and the Glory (Thesis). University of Kentucky. doi:10.13023/etd.2019.459.
- Lundberg, Mattias (8 April 2014). "Motivic cohesion and parsimony in three songs from Gentle Giant's Acquiring the Taste (1971)". Popular Music. 42 (2). Cambridge University Press: 269–292. doi:10.1017/S0261143014000257. (Textual analysis of three songs of album Acquiring the Taste)
- Shulman, Derek (2025), Giant Steps: My Improbable Journey From Stage Lights To Executive Heights, London: Jawbone Press (Derek Shulman's memoirs of being in Simon Dupree & the Big Sound, Gentle Giant, and as a music executive)
