= Kites (song) =

Single by Simon Dupree and the Big Sound
- B-side: "Like the Sun Like the Fire"
- Released: October 27, 1967
- Genre: Psychedelic pop
- Label: Parlophone
- Songwriters: Hal Hackady; Lee Pockriss
- Producer: David Paramor

Simon Dupree and the Big Sound singles chronology
"Day Time, Night Time" (1967)	"Kites" (1967)	"For Whom the Bell Tolls" (1968)

"Kites" is a ballad written by Hal Hackady and Lee Pockriss. It was first recorded by American country folk-singing trio the Rooftop Singers as their last single in 1967.

The song then became a hit for the British psychedelic band Simon Dupree and the Big Sound, featuring the three Shulman brothers who later formed the progressive rock band Gentle Giant. Their first releases had not been successful and they looked to their manager, John King, for inspiration. He suggested "Kites", which he had obtained from Robbins' Music. It was not their preferred style but King insisted.

The song was recorded at Abbey Road in London using unconventional instruments such as a wind machine and included a spoken interlude in Chinese, composed of "sweet nothings" and performed by the Chinese-Trinidadian actress Jacqui Chan, a friend of the band. The spoken words are in Cantonese, a language which she did not usually speak. One translation is: "I love you, I love you, My love is very strong. It flies high like a kite before the wind, Please do not let go of the string."

The single reached number 8 in the UK singles chart in late 1967 and, as an example of the early psychedelic rock style, it has since appeared on many compilations, especially those themed around psychedelia. Music historian Paul Stump called it "one of the first pop singles to employ a bank of keyboards simultaneously for melodic and colouristic purposes". The specific keyboards featured are organ, Mellotron, piano, and vibraphone.

The Associates, under the name of 39 Lyon Street, released a cover version of "Kites" as a single in 1981, with Christine Beveridge on lead vocals, a re-recorded version exclusive to the 12" version of the single "Breakfast" was released as its B-side under their own name in 1985.

Israeli rock band Nikmat HaTraktor had a hit with a Hebrew version of the track, taken from their 1990 self-titled debut studio album. Finnish musician Kirka had a similar local hit in 1968.
