= Malcolm Mortimore =

English drummer and percussionist (born 1953)

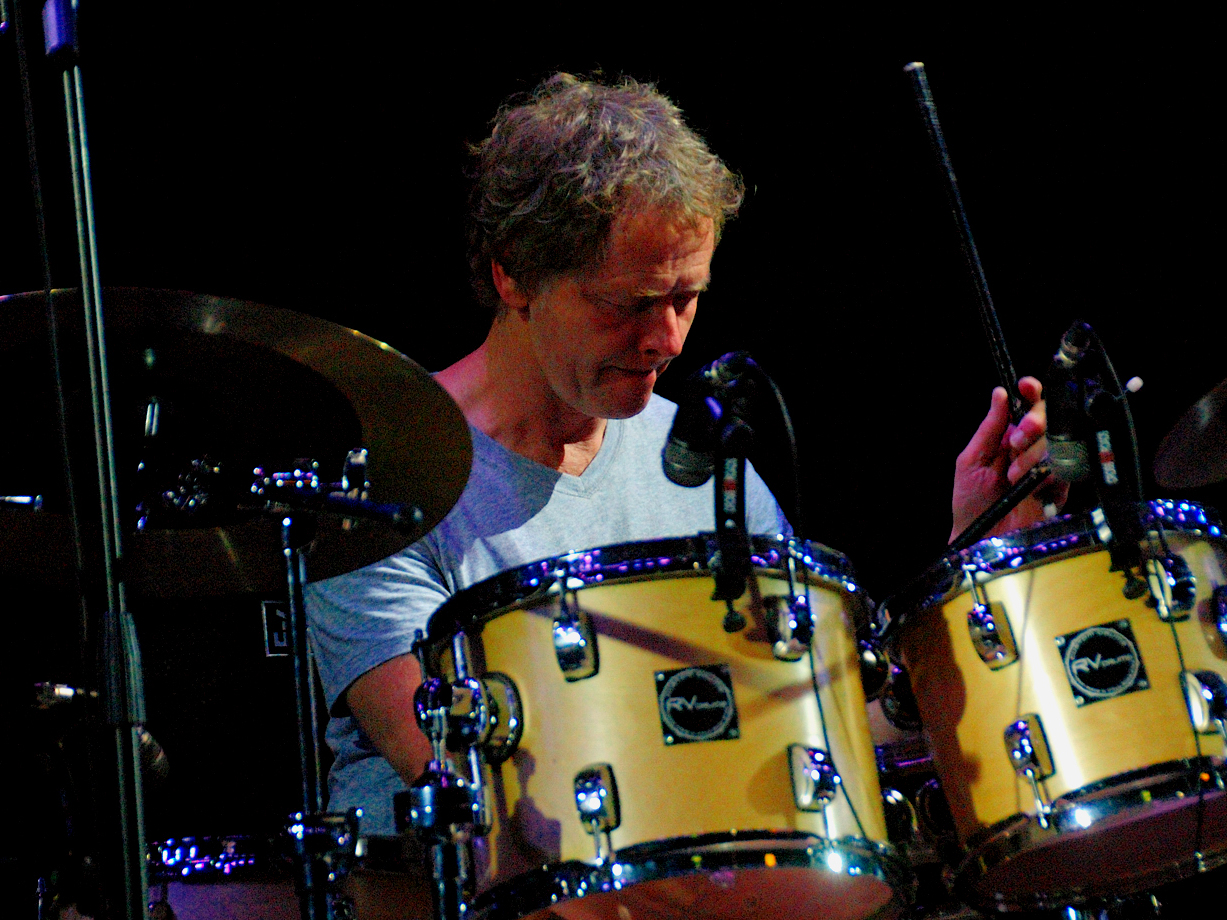
Mortimore performing in 2010

Malcolm Paul Mortimore (born 16 June 1953 in Wimbledon, London, England) is an English drummer and percussionist who has played with Arthur Brown, Ian Dury, Herbie Flowers, Gentle Giant, Spike Heatley, Tom Jones, G.T. Moore, Mick and Chris Jagger, Oliver Jones and Barney Kessel, Frankie Miller, Chris Spedding and Troy Tate.

In the 2000s, he has toured with the Gentle Giant spin-off band Three Friends, Us (Derek Austin, Herbie Flowers, Chris Spedding), and Chris Jagger's Atcha. In 2020, he joined Colosseum, replacing the late Jon Hiseman.
