= Ray Shulman =

English musician (1949–2023)

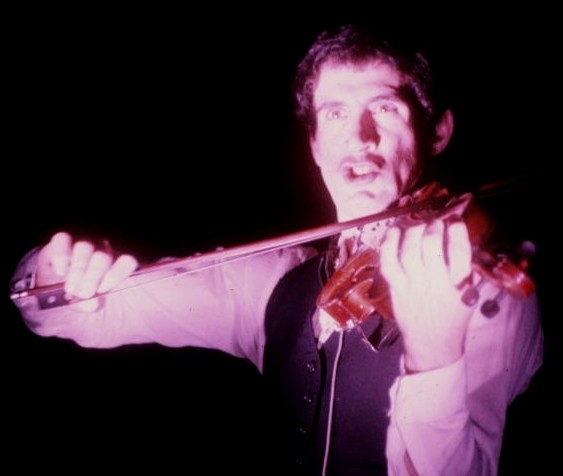
- Shulman performing in 1977

Background information
- Born: Raymond Shulman; 8 December 1949; Portsmouth, Hampshire, England
- Died: 30 March 2023 (aged 73) London, England
- Genres: Progressive rock
- Occupations: Musician; songwriter; record producer
- Instruments: Bass guitar; vocals; violin; viola; guitar; trumpet; recorder; keyboards; drums; percussion
- Years active: 1960s–2023
- Formerly of: Simon Dupree and the Big Sound; Gentle Giant

Raymond Shulman (8 December 1949 – 30 March 2023) was a British musician, songwriter, multi-instrumentalist, and record producer. With his brothers Derek and Phil, he co-founded the progressive rock band Gentle Giant. Shulman also worked as record producer in the late 1980s and early 1990s for alternative rock artists such as The Sundays and The Sugarcubes.

== Early life ==
Ray Shulman was born in Portsmouth to Lewis Shulman and Rebecca Laufer. He was a student at Portsmouth Technical high school. In 1966 joined his brother Derek Shulman's group, Simon Dupree and the Big Sound.

== Career ==
=== Simon Dupree and Gentle Giant ===
After many years of learning how to play the violin and guitar, he was primed for the National Youth Orchestra of Great Britain as a violinist, but his brother Derek convinced him to join his band Simon Dupree and the Big Sound, with their eldest brother Phil. They scored a hit in 1967 with Kites. Simon Dupree and the Big Sound later evolved into Gentle Giant in 1970. Shulman was in Gentle Giant from the beginning in 1970 to the last tour in 1980.

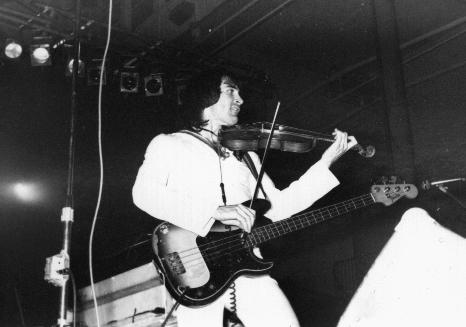
Ray Shulman at the Palais Rameau, Lille, France, on 25 May 1976

Primarily playing bass guitar, Shulman was quite adept at other instruments as well, sometimes doubling on violin, recorder, trumpet, and guitar. Shulman and keyboardist-bandmate Kerry Minnear composed or co-wrote much of the music for Gentle Giant.

=== Producing ===
He went on to become a record producer in the late 1980s and 1990s, working with the Sugarcubes, the Sundays, the Trash Can Sinatras, Ian McCulloch and the Defects, among others. He also created music for several video games, such as Privateer 2: The Darkening and Azrael's Tear and released two trance EPs under the pseudonym Head-Doctor.

== Death ==
Shulman died in London on 30 March 2023, at the age of 73. He was said to have been suffering from a long illness. He was survived by his wife, Barbara Tanner, and his two elder brothers, Derek and Phil Shulman. His death was announced via Gentle Giant's social media on 1 April 2023.
