= Kerry Minnear =

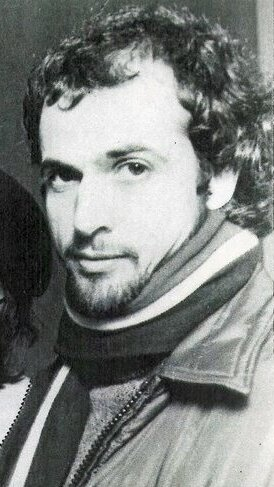
- Minnear in 1977

Background information
- Born: Kerry Churchill Minnear; 2 January 1948 (age 78)
- Genre: Progressive rock
- Occupations: Multi-instrumentalist; composer
- Instruments: Keyboards; vocals; cello; vibraphone; recorder; guitar; bass guitar; drums; percussion

Kerry Churchill Minnear (born 2 January 1948) is a multi-instrumentalist musician and composer. He is known primarily for his work with the progressive rock band Gentle Giant from 1970 to 1980.

He graduated from the Royal Academy of Music in London with a major in musical composition and minor in piano and classical percussion. As a member of Gentle Giant, he contributed to all 11 albums over the 10 years life of the band. Though he is adept at several instruments, he primarily played keyboards and provided back up and lead vocals. In addition to keyboard, he also played a multitude of other instruments such as the cello, recorder, guitar, and classical percussion (including vibraphone, marimba, xylophone, timpani and snare drum).

He also composed the original musical soundtrack for the 1996 video game Azrael's Tear along with Ray Shulman.

In the years following the dissolution of Gentle Giant, Minnear was a member of a Christian music band, The Reapers, in the 1980s. He was also a teacher and church organist. He also played occasionally with the group Three Friends, which reproduced Gentle Giant songs in concert.
