= The Amazing ZigZag Concert =

Live album by Various artists
- Released: 11 October 2010
- Recorded: Roundhouse, London, 28 April 1974
- Genre: Rock, pub rock, country rock
- Length: 4:08:01
- Label: Road Goes on Forever Records – RGF/ZZBOX1974
- Producer: Vic Maile (1974) Tony Poole (2010)

The Amazing Zig Zag Concert was a rock concert held at The Roundhouse on 28 April 1974 to celebrate the fifth anniversary of Zig Zag Magazine. Described as "one of the gigs of the decade", the concert "has taken on legendary proportions over the years" and featured Michael Nesmith with Red Rhodes, John Stewart, Help Yourself, Chilli Willi and the Red Hot Peppers and Starry Eyed and Laughing. The concert was recorded, but was not issued until 2010, when it was released as a 5-CD boxed set.

== Arrangement ==
The Concert was underwritten by Tony Stratton Smith, founder of Charisma Records, who had just taken over Zig Zag Magazine from its founder Pete Frame, although Frame remained with the magazine as a writer. The selected acts were favourites of Frame and the other ZigZag journalists; John Tobler, Andy Childs, and Connor McKnight. Andrew Lauder arranged and paid for Vic Maile to record the concert. In addition to the 5 acts featured on the CD release, Bristol folksinger Aj Webber, also played, but his performance was not recorded. Originally Chris Darrow and Kilburn and the High Roads were also slated to appear, but Darrow was out of the country, and Kilburn canceled their appearance due to a scheduling conflict.

== Reception ==
Professional ratings
Review scores
Source	Rating
Record Collector	5/5 stars

In Ptolemaic Terrascope, Phil McMullen described the recordings as "a vitally important document in the overall scheme of things" and "unashamedly" admitted that the Terrastock festivals "were directly influenced and inspired by the now legendary Zig Zag Benefit Concert" and concluded "It doesn’t get any better than this”.

In Record Collector, Kris Needs said the 5CDs "capture rapturously-received sets" "The sound is immaculate, that amazing atmosphere dripping from every whoop, holler and pin-dropped hush" and gave it a 5-star rating

== CD boxed set ==
The recording of the concert remained unreleased until 2010 when Tony Poole (formerly of Starry Eyed and Laughing) edited and remixed the tapes. The 5 CD boxed set was issued on Tobler's Road Goes on Forever Records label, October 11, 2010.

== CD1 - Starry Eyed and Laughing ==
This is the earliest released recording of Starry Eyed and Laughing, featuring their original drummer, Nick Brown, who left the band only a few weeks after this concert. Eight of the songs performed at the concert appeared on their eponymous debut album with new drummer Michael Wackford, released in October, 1974. ZigZag's Pete Frame was later to become their manager.

Track listing Excluding song introductions, which the CD lists as separate tracks

1. "Going Down" (McGeeney)
2. "Nobody Home" (Poole)
3. "Never Say Too Late" (Whitmore)
4. "Down the Street" (McGeeney)
5. "Money is no Friend of Mine" (Poole)
6. "Everybody" (McGeeney)
7. "Oh What" (Poole)
8. "Chimes of Freedom" (Dylan)
9. "50/50 (Better Stop Now)" (Whitmore)
10. "Living in London" (McGeeney/Poole)

Personnel

- Tony Poole - Guitar, Vocals
- Ross McGeeney - Guitar, Vocals
- Iain Whitmore - Bass, Vocals
- Nick Brown - Drums, Vocals

== CD2 - Chilli Willi and the Red Hot Peppers ==
Chilli Willi and the Red Hot Peppers were well known on the London pub-rock circuit, but it is felt that they never captured "the magical ambiance of their best live shows on record". This, their only officially released live recording, was made shortly before they recorded the album Bongos Over Balham. Having met the band at this concert, Michael Nesmith produced five tracks at the Bongos recording session, although only two tracks appeared on the released album.

Track listing Excluding song introductions, which the CD lists as separate tracks

1. "I'll Be Home" (Philip Charles Lithman)
2. "The Streets of Baltimore" (Tompall Glaser, Harlan Howard)
3. "Papa and Mama Had Love" (Doug Kershaw)
4. "Midnight Bus" (Jesse Winchester)
5. "Older Guys" (Gram Parsons, Chris Hillman, Bernie Leadon)
6. "Desert Island Woman" (Philip Charles Lithman)
7. "Friday Song" (Philip Charles Lithman)
8. "Goodbye Nashville, Hello Camden Town" (Philip Charles Lithman)
9. "Walkin' Blues" (Robert Johnson)
10. "Just Like the Devil" (Traditional; arranged by Martin Stone)
11. "Boppin' the Blues" (Carl Perkins, Howard "Curly" Griffin)
12. "Choo Choo Ch'Boogie" (Vaughn Horton, Denver Darling, Milt Gabler)
13. "Fire on the Mountain" (Traditional; arranged by Chilli Willi)
14. "Drunken Sunken Redneck Blues"(Philip Charles Lithman)
15. "Six Days on the Road" (Earl Green, Carl Montgomery)

Personnel

- Phil "Snakefinger" Lithman - Guitar, Steel Guitar, Vocals
- Martin Stone - Guitar, Vocals
- Paul "Bassman" Riley - Bass, Vocals
- Paul "Dice Man" Bailey - Guitar, Banjo, Sax, Vocals
- Pete Thomas - Drums, Percussion
- Will Stallibrass - Harmonica

== CD3 - John Stewart ==
John Stewart and his bass player Arnie Moore flew in from the US for the concert and borrowed Chilli Willi's drummer Pete Thomas. Stewart had recorded The Phoenix Concerts the previous month, although this had yet to be released. Many songs appear on both albums, but with a stripped-down sound on this album, as The Phoenix Concerts had a larger band.

Track listing Excluding song introductions, which the CD lists as separate tracks

All tracks were written by John Stewart

1. "Wheatfield Lady"
2. "Daydream Believer"
3. "You Can't Look Back"
4. "California Bloodlines"
5. "Armstrong"
6. "Road Away"
7. "Last Campaign Trilogy"
8. "July You're a Woman"
9. "Runaway Fool of Love"
10. "Lady and the Outlaw"
11. "Cops"
12. "Mother Country"
13. "Never Goin' Back (to Nashville Anymore)"
14. "Let The Big Horse Run"

Personnel

- John Stewart - Guitar
- Arnie Moore - Bass
- Pete Thomas - Drums

== CD4 - Help Yourself ==
Help Yourself had disbanded in August 1973 and reformed to appear at this concert; Morley, Whaley and Leonard flying in from Switzerland where Man, who they were all then with, were on tour. Whaley, their original bass player, started off the set, with Burton, who replaced him, playing the later numbers, along with Leonard, who had briefly been a member in 1972.

Track listing Excluding song introductions, which the CD lists as separate tracks

1. "Running Down Deep" (Morley)
2. "Reaffirmation" (Burton/Treece/Morley)
3. "American Mother" (Tyla/Morley)
4. "Blown Away" (Morley)

Personnel

- Malcolm Morley - Guitar, Keyboards, Vocals
- Richard Treece - Guitar
- Ken Whaley - Bass (Tracks 1–2)
- David Charles - Drums
- Paul Burton - Bass (Tracks 3–4)
- Deke Leonard - Guitar, Keyboards, Vocals (Tracks 3–4)

== CD5 - Michael Nesmith with Red Rhodes ==
Michael Nesmith brought his pedal steel guitarist Red Rhodes with him and quickly established a rapport with the audience, playing "the storytelling troubadour" with thoughts, asides, and introductions. Tony Stratton Smith tempted Nesmith to travel to the UK for the concert by asking him to produce Bert Jansch's album L.A. Turnaround, on which Nesmith and Rhodes also play.

Track listing Excluding song introductions, which the CD lists as separate tracks

All tracks are credited to Michael Nesmith on the CD slipcase, although "Wax Minute" was actually written by Richard Stekol

1. "Joanne"
2. "Some of Shelly's Blues"
3. "Silver Moon"
4. "Different Drum"
5. "Propinquity"
6. "Grand Ennui"
7. "Wax Minute"
8. "Tomorrow and Me"
9. "Upside of Goodbye"
10. "Roll with the Flow"
11. "Marie's Theme"

Personnel

- Michael Nesmith - Guitar, Vocals
- Red Rhodes - Pedal Steel Guitar

== Credits ==
- Pete Frame and John Tobler - Concept
- Tony Stratton Smith - Promoter
- Vic Maile - Recording Engineer (1974)
- Paul Conroy - Organization
- Tony Poole - Editing and Mastering (2010)
