= Starry Eyed and Laughing =

English rock band of the 1970s

- Also known as: Starry Eyed
- Origin: London, England
- Genres: Rock, folk rock, pub rock, country rock
- Years active: 1973–1976
- Labels: CBS; Aurora Records; Road Goes On Forever Records
- Past members: Tony Poole; Ross McGeeney; Steve Hall; Nick Brown; Iain Whitmore; Mick Wackford; Roger Kelly
- Website: starryeyedandlaughing.com

Starry Eyed and Laughing were an English rock band of the 1970s. Formed in 1973, they released two albums on CBS, recorded three Peel Sessions and undertook a US tour, before briefly evolving into Starry Eyed, and finally disbanding in 1976.

== History ==
Tony Poole and Ross McGeeney were friends from the age of six, and formed a band whilst they were still at school in Bedford. "The Chymes", comprised McGeeney and Pete Warren on guitars, Poole on bass and Mick Roope on drums. On leaving school they separated, but reunited in London, and formed an acoustic duo, playing original numbers between covers of songs by Bob Dylan, The Beatles and The Byrds.

They became an electric duo in May 1973, and adopted the name Starry Eyed and Laughing, from a line in Dylan's song "Chimes of Freedom", which they regularly performed. The band's first gig under that name was on 28 May 1973 at the Duke of Clarence pub in Shepherd's Bush, London. They recorded some songs at a studio owned by Steve Hall, who joined on bass, and then recruited drummer Nick Brown. They became early performers on the London pub rock circuit, before Hall left and Iain Whitmore, who had been in Patches with Leo Sayer, took over on bass. They appeared at ZigZag fifth anniversary concert at The Roundhouse on 28 April 1974, which was recorded, but not released until 2010. Brown left and was replaced by Michael Wackford, just prior to their being signed in May 1974 by CBS Records, who released a single "Money is no Friend of Mine" followed by their first album Starry Eyed and Laughing, mostly written by Poole and McGeeney and noted for its Byrds like sound - Poole playing a Rickenbacker 12string, and McGeeney a Fender Telecaster in a style similar to that of Clarence White. The album, released in October 1974, also featured B. J. Cole, Peter Wood, Ray Jackson, Russ Ballard and Jeff Bannister, who had been in The Alan Bown Set. They recorded three Peel Sessions; in July 1974, February 1975 and July 1975.

Their second single "Nobody Home", was followed by their second album Thought Talk, in a heavier style and featuring guest appearances from Frank Ricotti, Pete Zorn and Jeff Bannister. A single "Good Love" was released from this album and they toured as support to Kevin Coyne and headlined numerous gigs in London. ZigZag magazine founder Pete Frame became their manager, and the band were supposed to undertake a 110 date US tour, organised by Columbia Records to promote their new acts, but this instead became a 37-date ten-week US tour, supporting a diverse range of bands including Weather Report, J Geils, Toots and the Maytals and Flo and Eddie. Soon after their return to the UK, their management went bust and McGeeney parted company with the band, to be replaced by Roger Kelly for a UK tour, before appearing on German TVs Rockpalast for which McGeeney rejoined, forming a three-guitar quintet, which continued until their final gig in April 1976.

Poole and McGeeney, together with Wackford, released two singles on CBS Records as Starry Eyed, produced by Flo & Eddie, "Song on the Radio" and "Saturday", before finally disbanding in 1976.

== Later careers ==
- Ross McGeeney played on the Tigers album Savage Music and moved into ska music.
- Roger Kelly joined Streetband with Paul Young but left when they evolved into Q-Tips.
- Michael Wackford formed Roses, and later went into astrology.
- Iain Whitmore initially formed Kites and then joined Violinski (as Ian Whitmore). He also released a solo album War Cries
- Tony Poole went into production, including albums by Danny and the Champions of the World, Maddy Prior, Steeleye Span, Giles Lewin, Pentangle (band) and The Men They Couldn't Hang as well as the Danish bands Janes Rejoice, with whom he also played electric 12 string/acoustic guitar and Sharing Patrol. He also produced and backed Katie Humble on True to Your Soul and Peter O'Brien on Junked Cars & Beat Up Guitars.
- Whitmore and Poole recorded Fallen as The Falcons and Start The Countdown as The Sun, with Kinks drummer Nick Trevisick.

== Discography ==
=== Studio albums ===
- Starry Eyed and Laughing (1974) CBS (CBS 80450)
- Thought Talk (1975) CBS (CBS 80907)
- Bells of Lightning. (2021) self-released

=== Live albums ===
- The Amazing ZigZag Concert (2010) Road Goes on Forever (RGF/ZZBOX1974) Disc 1 of 5CD Box set
  Also features Chilli Willi and the Red Hot Peppers, Help Yourself, John Stewart and Michael Nesmith

=== Compilation albums ===
- That Was Now and This Is Then (2002) Aurora (2CD containing both albums in full and all singles)
- All Their Best... (2009) Broadside (1CD compilation taken from both albums, the singles and a radio show)
