= Forgotten Songs of Some Old Yesterday =

Compilation album by John Stewart
- Released: March 1980
- Genre: Folk
- Length: 47:23
- Label: RCA
- Producer: Nikolas Venet, David Kershenbaum

John Stewart chronology
John Stewart In Concert (1980)	Forgotten Songs of Some Old Yesterday (1980)	Dream Babies Go Hollywood (1980)

Professional ratings
Review scores
Source	Rating
Allmusic	2.5/5 stars

Forgotten Songs of Some Old Yesterday is a compilation album released in 1980 by folk musician John Stewart, former member of The Kingston Trio. This album was only released in Great Britain and includes the otherwise unavailable "Rodeo Mary".

== Track listing ==
All compositions by John Stewart except where noted.

- Side one
1. "Wheatfield Lady" (John Stewart, David Kershenbaum) – 2:13
  - From a single released in 1974. Produced by David Kershenbaum
2. "You Can't Look Back" – 1:43
  - From the album The Phoenix Concerts 1974
3. "July, You're a Woman" – 3:29
  - From the album The Phoenix Concerts 1974
4. "Let the Big Horse Run" – 4:01
  - From the album John Stewart in Concert 1980
5. "Cody" – 3:13
  - From the album The Phoenix Concerts 1974
6. "California Bloodlines" – 4:40
  - From the album The Phoenix Concerts 1974
7. "Mother Country" – 5:30
  - From the album The Phoenix Concerts 1974
- Side two
1. "All Time Woman" – 3:18
  - From the album Cannons in the Rain 1973
2. "Anna on a Memory" – 3:05
  - From the album Cannons in the Rain 1973
3. "Armstrong" – 2:33
  - From the album Cannons in the Rain 1973
4. "Cannons in the Rain" – 3:21
  - From the album Cannons in the Rain 1973
5. "Hung on a Heart (Of a Man Back Home)" – 3:51
  - From the album Wingless Angels 1975
6. "Road Away" – 3:03
  - From the album Cannons in the Rain 1973
7. "Rodeo Mary" (John Stewart, Michael Cannon) – 3:23
  - Previously unreleased track. Outtake from the Wingless Angels sessions.
