= Roundhouse (venue) =

Performing arts venue in London, England

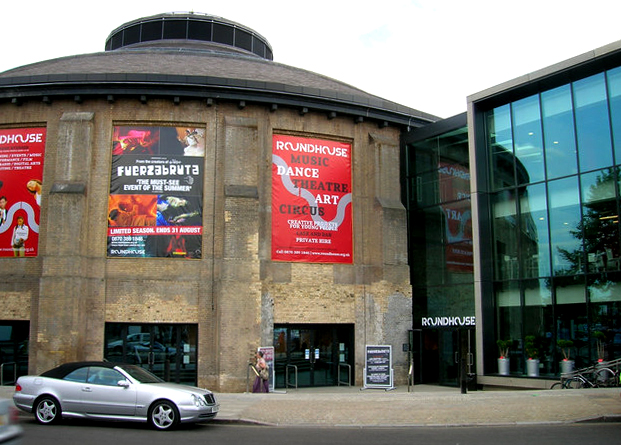
- Main entrance to the Roundhouse
- Interactive map of Roundhouse
- Location: Chalk Farm, London, England
- Coordinates: 51.5432°N 0.1519°W
- Capacity: 1,700 seated; 3,300 standing
- Public transit: Chalk Farm

Construction
- Built: 1846–1847
- Renovated: 2004–2005
- Architects: Robert Stephenson, Robert B. Dockray (original); John McAslan & Partners (renovation)

Website
- Roundhouse.org.uk

The Roundhouse is a performing arts and concert venue at the Grade II* listed former railway engine shed in Chalk Farm, London, England. The building was erected in 1846–1847 by the London & North Western Railway as a roundhouse, a circular building containing a railway turntable, but was used for that purpose for only about a decade. After being used as a warehouse for a number of years, the building fell into disuse just before World War II. It was first made a listed building in 1954.

It reopened after 25 years, in 1964, as a performing arts venue, when the playwright Arnold Wesker established the Centre 42 Theatre Company and adapted the building as a theatre. The large circular structure has hosted various promotions, such as the launch of the underground paper International Times in 1966, one of only two UK appearances by The Doors with Jim Morrison in 1968, and the Greasy Truckers Party in 1972.

The Greater London Council ceded control of the building to Camden Council in 1983. By that time, Centre 42 had run out of funds and the building remained unused until a local businessman purchased the building in 1996 and performing arts shows returned. It was closed again in 2004 for a multi-million pound redevelopment. On 1 June 2006, the Argentine show Fuerzabruta opened at the new Roundhouse.

Since 2006, the Roundhouse has hosted the BBC Electric Proms and numerous iTunes Festivals, as well as award ceremonies such as the BT Digital Music Awards and the Vodafone Live Music Awards. In line with the continuing legacy of avant-garde productions, NoFit State Circus performed the show Tabú during which the audience were encouraged to move around the performance space.

== History ==
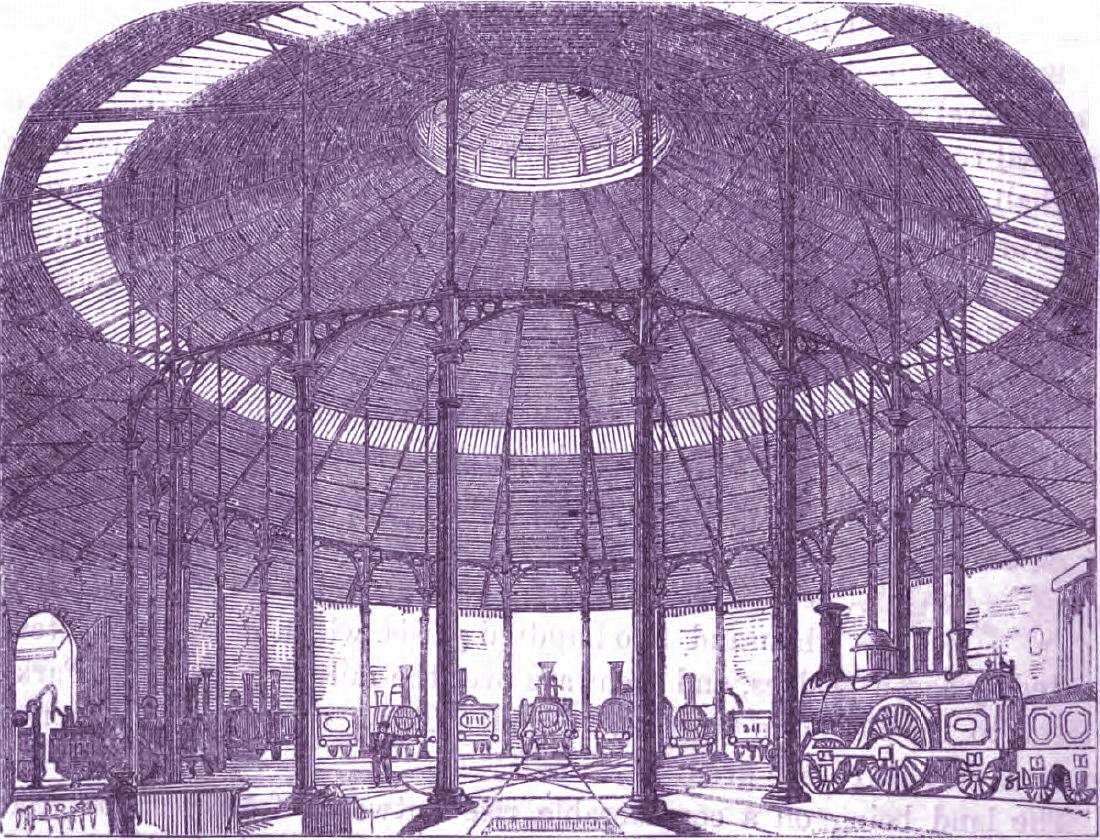
The Great Circular Engine House, or the Luggage Engine House, c. 1850

The Roundhouse was built as a turntable engine shed (or roundhouse) for the London & Birmingham Railway. Known as the Great Circular Engine House, or the Luggage Engine House, it was built by Branson & Gwyther, using designs by architects Robert B. Dockray and Robert Stephenson. Construction started in 1846 and the building opened in 1847.

Within ten years locomotives became too long for the building to accommodate, and the Roundhouse was used for various other purposes. The longest period of use (50 years, beginning in 1871) was as a bonded warehouse for gin distillers W & A Gilbey Ltd.

In 1964 the premises were transferred to Centre 42, which prepared a scheme to convert the building into "a permanent cultural centre with a theatre, cinema, art gallery and workshops, committee rooms for local organisations, library, youth club and restaurant dance-hall". This was estimated to cost between £300,000 and £600,000 (£7.1 million–£14.2 million in 2024 worth), and was supported by "well-known actors, playwrights, authors, musicians and others". In 1966 the Roundhouse became an arts venue, after the freehold was taken up by the then new Greater London Council. The opening concert was the 15 October 1966 All Night Rave, in which Soft Machine and Pink Floyd appeared at the launch of the underground newspaper International Times. The first major concert took place on New Year's Eve 1966, when a night called Psychadelicamania was headlined by The Who. During the next decade the building became a significant venue for UK Underground music events Middle Earth and Implosion. Many of these were hosted and promoted by Jeff Dexter. Other bands playing at the Roundhouse during this period included Gass, The Rolling Stones, Jeff Beck, The Yardbirds, Zoot Money's Dantalian's Chariot, David Bowie, Jimi Hendrix, Pink Floyd, Led Zeppelin, The Incredible String Band, Fleetwood Mac, Third World War, The Doors with Jefferson Airplane, the Ramones, The Clash with The Jam, Elvis Costello, Elkie Brooks, Otis Redding, and Motörhead, who appeared at the Roundhouse on 20 July 1975. In 1978, Television Personalities referenced the venue on their EP 'Part Time Punks' with the song 'Posing at the Roundhouse'.

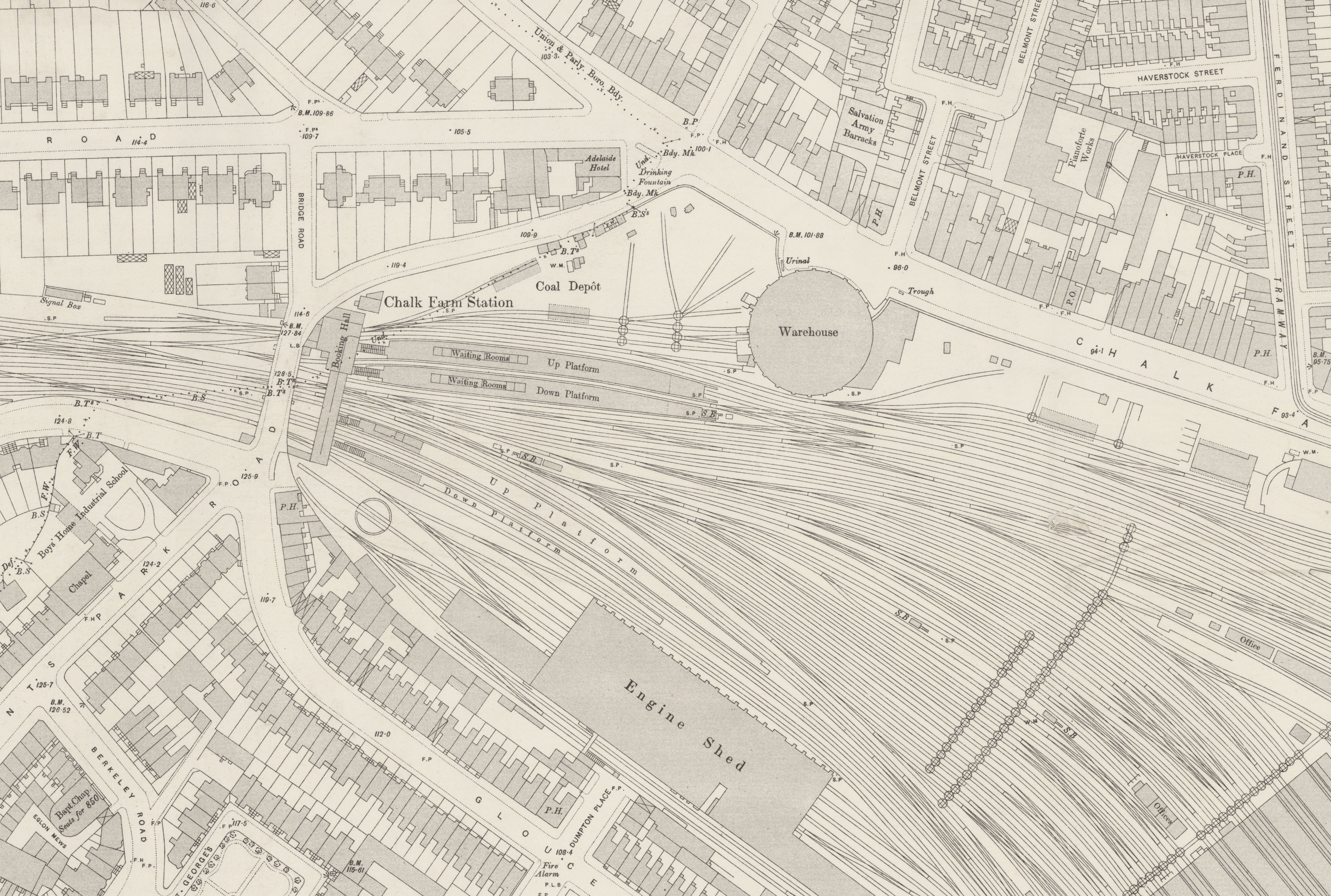
The Roundhouse, labelled as "Warehouse", on an 1895 Ordnance Survey map.

While lying in a state of general abandonment in the 1980s, the Roundhouse was used as the main location for the science fiction horror film Hardware by Richard Stanley. Sets were built inside the structure, although the lack of proper soundproofing meant all of the dialogues had to be re-recorded.

The building was used again in 1996 to film the promotional video for the Manic Street Preachers' single "A Design for Life" prior to the start of redevelopment. Promotional videos for the singles "No Matter What" by Boyzone (1998) and "Handbags & Gladrags" by Stereophonics (2001) were also filmed there. A scene from the comedy film Smashing Time set in the revolving restaurant at the top of the GPO Tower was filmed there in 1967. In July that year the Roundhouse hosted the "Dialectics of Liberation" with (among others) R. D. Laing, Herbert Marcuse and Allen Ginsberg.

The Roundhouse has also been used for theatre, and has had two periods of theatrical glory, with musicals such as Catch My Soul (1969). Under administrator George Hoskins, the first phase also featured experimental theatre productions, such as the Living Theatre production of 1776 and other plays directed by Peter Brook. The once controversial nude revue Oh! Calcutta! opened in July 1970, and started a run of nearly four thousand performances in London, and the anarchic "Evening of British Rubbish" with professor Bruce Lacey and The Alberts had one performance in 1967.

The Greater London Council passed the building to the Camden London Borough Council in 1983, and attempts were made to establish it as a Black Arts Centre programming music, theatre and community projects; however, it was closed as a venue due to lack of funds. During this time, on New Year's Eve 1991/92, Spiral Tribe held a week-long party in the venue. During the party the generators cut out, so power had to be sourced from nearby British Rail train lines.

=== Restoration ===
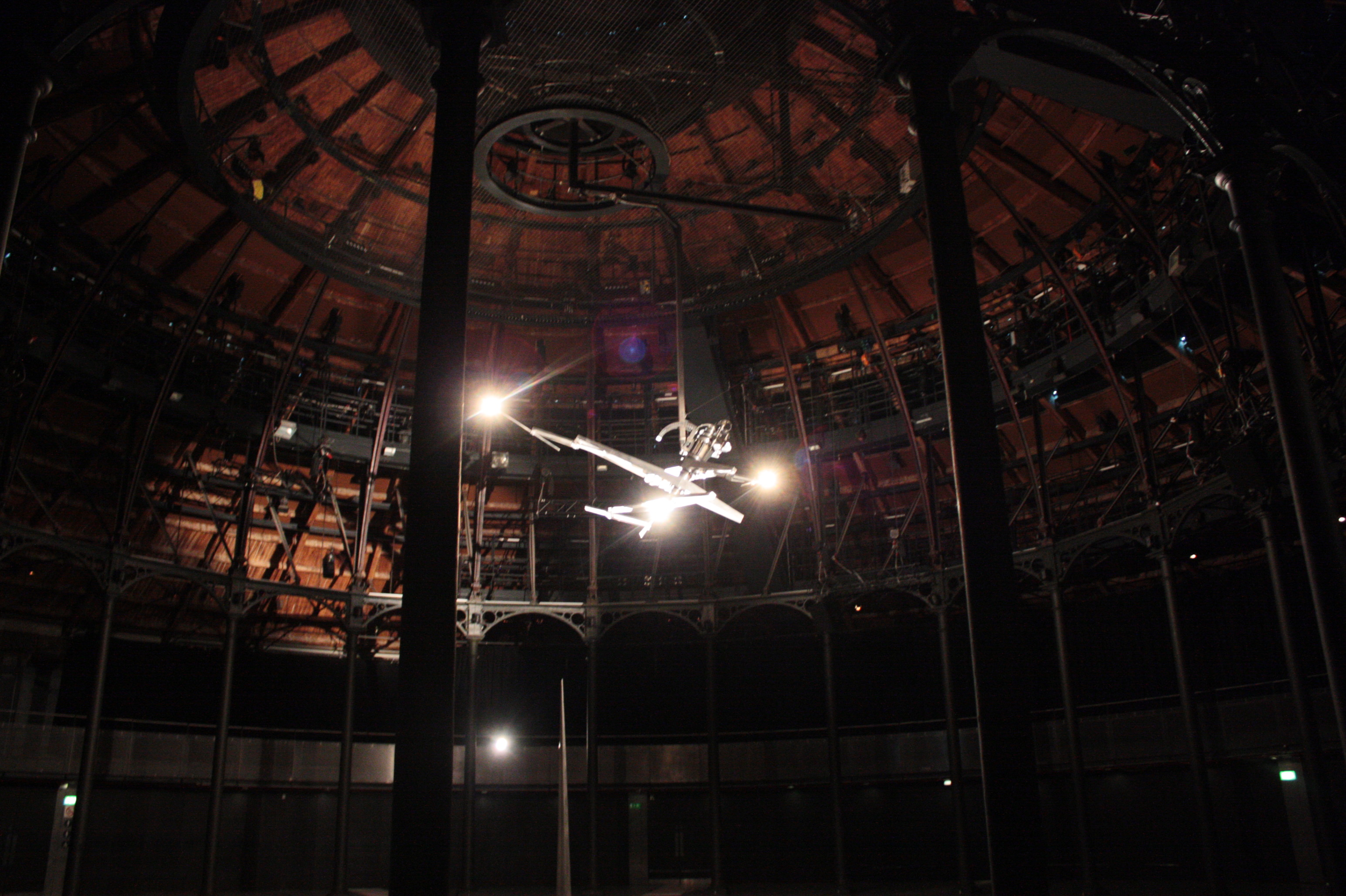
Interior of Camden Roundhouse in 2013

The building lay largely empty until it was purchased for £6m in 1996 by the Norman Trust led by the philanthropist Torquil Norman. In 1998 he set up the Roundhouse Trust and led its redevelopment, with a board of trustees which included musicians Bob Geldof and Suggs, and filmmaker Terry Gilliam.

The venue opened for a two-year period to raise awareness and funds for a redevelopment scheme, with former Battersea Arts Centre director Paul Blackman as its director. Shows promoted at this time included the Royal National Theatre's Oh, What a Lovely War!, dancer Michael Clark's comeback performance, percussion extravaganza Stomp, Ken Campbell's 24-hour-long show The Warp and the Argentine De La Guarda's Villa Villa which ran for a year, becoming the venue's longest running show, ending when the building was closed for redevelopment.

The website dance.com, commenting on the redevelopment project, said:

The redeveloped Roundhouse will house up to 3,300 people standing or up to 1,700 seated. It will provide a highly flexible and adaptable performance space that will give artists and audiences opportunities and experiences they cannot find elsewhere. It will accommodate a programme of work that reflects the excitement and diversity of twenty-first-century culture. It will include a wide range of the performing arts including, music, theatre, dance, circus and digital media.

The renovated Roundhouse, designed by architects John McAslan & Partners in association with engineering company Buro Happold, reopened on 1 June 2006, promoting Fuerzabruta. Since 1996 the renovations had cost £27m.

On 20 December 2006, George Michael held a free concert for NHS nurses as a thank you for the care given to his mother Lesley, who died of cancer in 1997.

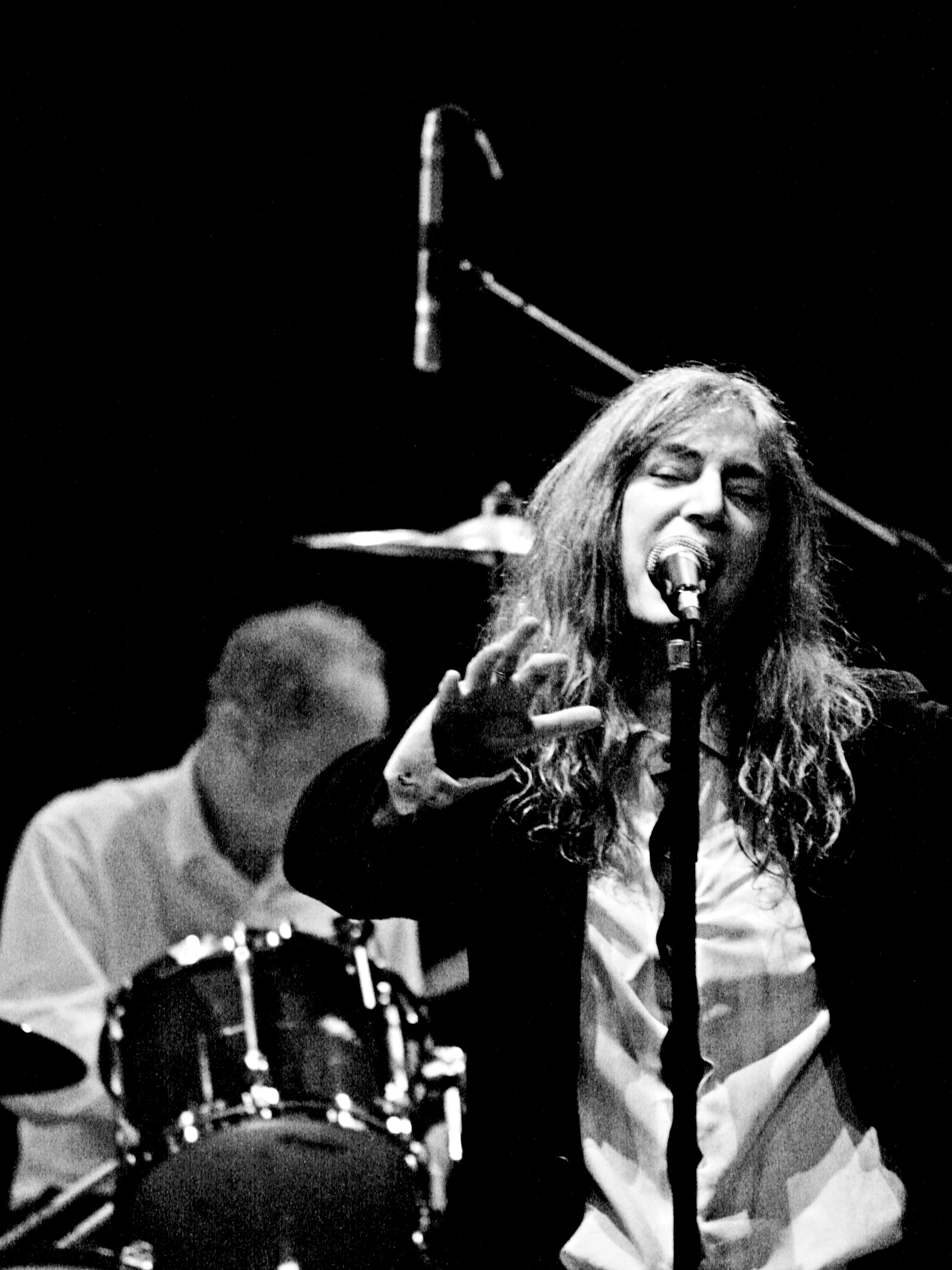
Patti Smith performing at Roundhouse, 17 May 2007

In 2008, Michael Boyd, artistic director of the Royal Shakespeare Company, transferred his RSC Histories Cycle to the Roundhouse, rearranging the performing space to match the Courtyard Theatre in Stratford upon Avon, where the cycle had first been staged.

On 31 March 2009, the charitable circus group NoFit State began presenting Tabu, using the open space at the Roundhouse. On 26 April 2009, Bob Dylan and his band performed at the Roundhouse as part of his 2009 UK tour, and in July 2009 the iTunes Music Festival (supported by Apple Computer) was held at the venue.

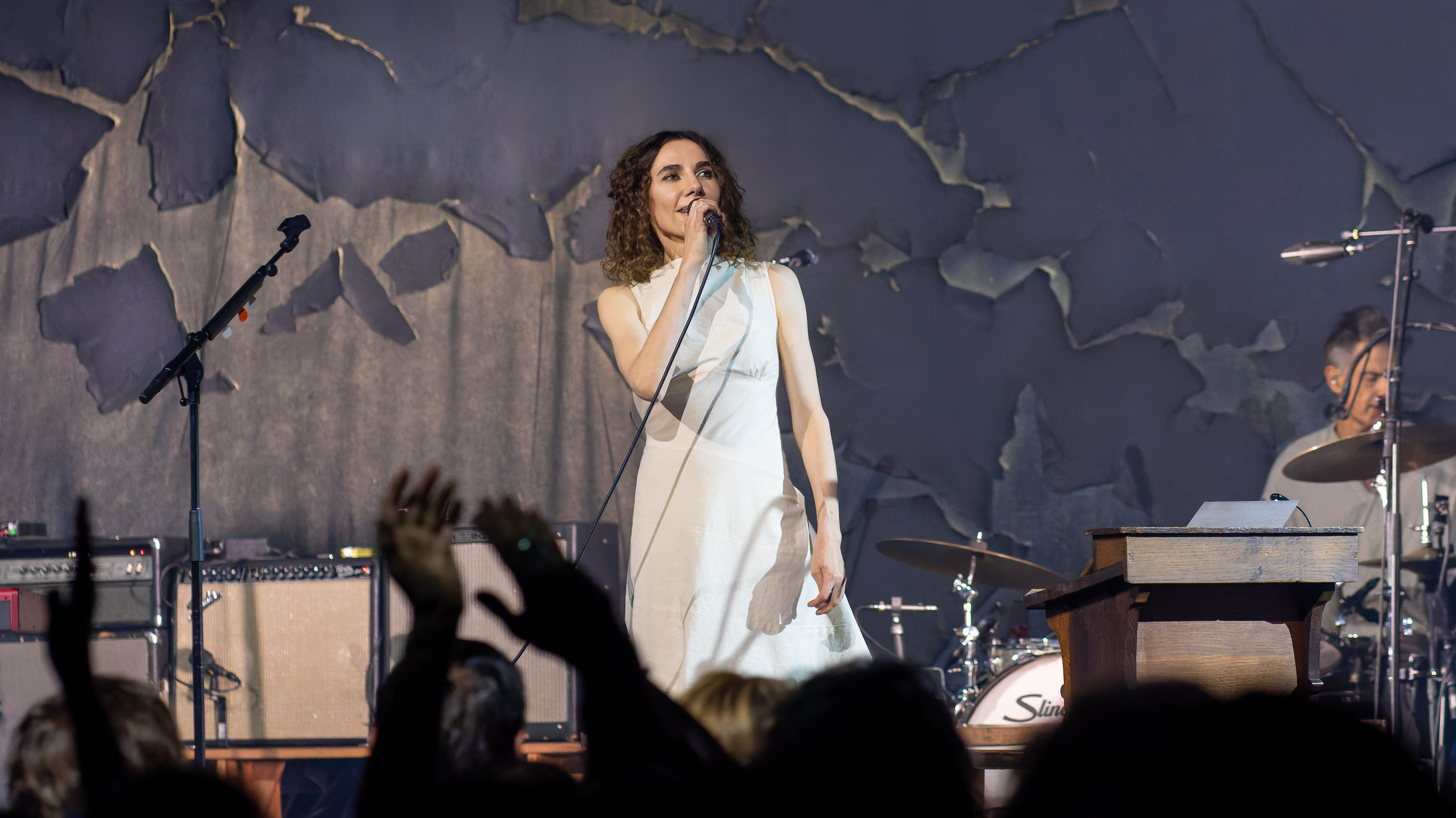
PJ Harvey performing at the Roundhouse, 2023

In January 2010, the Roundhouse introduced contemporary classical music to its events repertoire when it hosted the Reverb festival, which included performances by the London Contemporary Orchestra, the Orchestra of the Age of Enlightenment, The Magnets, Nico Muhly, Sam Amidon and the Britten Sinfonia.

For the September 2015 Apple Music Festival, Apple announced an environmental makeover gift for the venue: "making major upgrades to the lighting, plumbing, and HVAC systems; installing recycling and composting bins… offering reusable water bottles instead of plastic ones… to reduce the Roundhouse's annual carbon emissions by 60 tons, save 60,000 gallons of water a year, and divert more than 1,600 kilograms of waste from landfills".

== Roundhouse Trust ==
Alongside its role as an arts venue, the Roundhouse is also a registered charity and runs a creative programme for 11–25s through the Roundhouse Trust.

From 2006 to 2012 the Trust taught over 13,000 11- to 25-year-olds in live music, circus, theatre and new media. Courses are held in the Roundhouse Studios, which include a music recording suite, film production rooms, TV and radio studios and rehearsal rooms, all located underneath the Main Space.

== Architecture ==
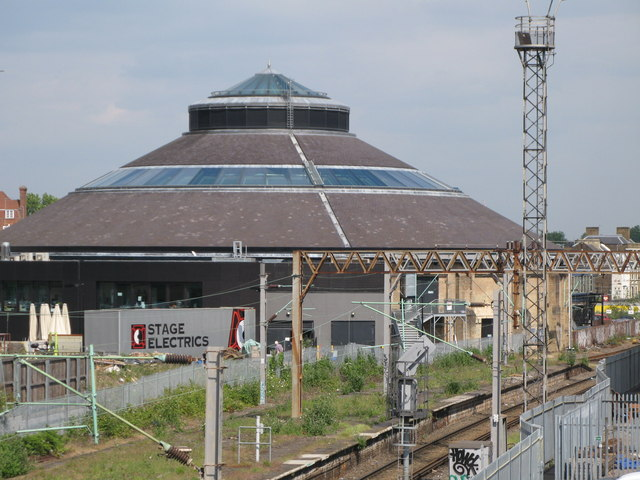
The Roundhouse in 2007

The Roundhouse is Grade II* listed. It was declared a National Heritage Site in 2010, when a Transport Trust Heritage Plaque was presented by Prince Michael of Kent. It is regarded as a notable example of mid-19th century railway architecture. The original building, 48 metres (157 ft) in diameter, is constructed in yellow brick and is distinctive for its unusual circular shape and pointed roof. The conical slate roof has a central smoke louvre (now glazed) and is supported by 24 cast-iron Doric columns (arranged around the original locomotive spaces) and a framework of curved ribs. The interior has original flooring and parts of the turntable and fragments of early railway lines.

The 2006 renovation was supported with conservation advice and funding from English Heritage and with grants from the Heritage Lottery Fund and the Arts Council England. The project added seven layers of soundproofing to the roof, reinstated the glazed roof-lights, and added the steel and glass New Wing, which curves around the north side of the main building, to house the box office, bar and café, an art gallery foyer and offices.

== Bibliography ==
- Bane, M., White Boy Singin' the Blues, London: Penguin, 1982, ISBN 0-14-006045-6
- Bob Brunning, Blues: The British Connection, London: Helter Skelter Publishing, 2002, ISBN 1-900924-41-2 – First edition 1986; Second edition 1995, Blues in Britain
- Bob Brunning, The Fleetwood Mac Story: Rumours and Lies, London: Omnibus Press, 1990 and 1998, ISBN 0-7119-6907-8
- Martin Celmins, Peter Green – Founder of Fleetwood Mac, London: Sanctuary, 1995, foreword by B. B. King, ISBN 1-86074-233-5
- Fancourt, L., British Blues on Record (1957–1970), Retrack Books, 1989
- Dick Heckstall-Smith, The Safest Place in the World: A personal history of British Rhythm and blues, Quartet Books Limited, 1989, ISBN 0-7043-2696-5 – Second Edition: Blowing The Blues – Fifty Years Playing The British Blues, Clear Books, 2004, ISBN 1-904555-04-7
- Christopher Hjort, Strange Brew: Eric Clapton and the British blues boom, 1965–1970, foreword by John Mayall, Jawbone, 2007, ISBN 1-906002-00-2
- Paul Myers, Long John Baldry and the Birth of the British Blues, Vancouver GreyStone Books, 2007, ISBN 1-55365-200-2
- Harry Shapiro Alexis Korner: The Biography, London: Bloomsbury Publishing PLC, 1997, Discography by Mark Troster, ISBN 0-7475-3163-3
- Schwartz, R. F., How Britain got the Blues: The transmission and reception of American blues style in the United Kingdom, Ashgate, 2007, ISBN 0-7546-5580-6
- Mike Vernon, The Blue Horizon Story 1965–1970 vol. 1, notes of the booklet of the box set (60 pages)

== Discography ==
- Alex Korner's Breakdown Group Featuring Cyril Davis: Blues From The Roundhouse (1957)
- The Beatles: Carnival of Light (1967)
- The Rolling Stones: Deluxe edition bonus disc of Sticky Fingers, recorded 1971, released 2015 (5 tracks)
- Greasy Truckers: Greasy Truckers Party (1972) (Hawkwind, Man, Brinsley Schwarz and Magic Michael)
- Hawkwind: "Silver Machine" (recorded 1972)
- Mott the Hoople: "Saturday Gigs" (recorded 1974) contains the line "Float up to the Roundhouse on a Sunday afternoon".
- Man: Back into the Future (recorded 1973)
- Nektar: Sunday Night at London Roundhouse (recorded 1973, released 1974)
- The Amazing ZigZag Concert (recorded 1974, released 2010) Michael Nesmith with Red Rhodes, John Stewart, Help Yourself, Chilli Willi and the Red Hot Peppers and Starry Eyed and Laughing.
- Pink Fairies: Live at the Roundhouse 1975 – released in 1982
- Man: Maximum Darkness (recorded 1975)
- UFO Lights Out 1976 (bonus tracks only)
- Man: All's Well That Ends Well (recorded 1977)
- The Damned: The Captain's Birthday Party recorded 1977 – released 1986
- Motörhead: What's Words Worth? (recorded 1978)
- M People: "One Night in Heaven" 1993
- Opeth: The Roundhouse Tapes (recorded 2006)
- The Dresden Dolls: Live at the Roundhouse (recorded 2006)
- The Stranglers: Rattus at the Roundhouse (recorded 2007)
- Fat Freddy's Drop: Live at Roundhouse (recorded 2008)
- Shpongle: Live in Concert (2008)
- David Gray: Draw the Line 2009 (bonus CD only)
- Oasis: Time Flies... 1994–2009 (Disc 4: iTunes Live: London Festival, recorded 2009)
- Ultravox: Return to Eden Live at the Roundhouse (13 April 2010)
- The King Blues: Live at the Roundhouse (recorded 2011)
- Linkin Park: iTunes Festival: London 2011 (EP) (recorded 2011)
- Adele: iTunes Festival: London 2011 (recorded 2011)
- City and Colour: City and Colour: Europe 2011 (Live in London) [The Roundhouse 18.10.11] (recorded 2011)
- Ed Sheeran: iTunes Festival Day 2 2012
- Devin Townsend: The Retinal Circus (recorded 2012)
- Lady Gaga: Live at iTunes Festival (Artpop: Disc 2, recorded 2013)
- Sam Smith: Sam Smith Live from the Roundhouse (released 2014)
- Franz Ferdinand: Live 2014 at the London Roundhouse (recorded 2014)
- Status Quo: Aquostic! Live at the Roundhouse (recorded 2014)
- Europe: The Final Countdown: 30th Anniversary Show (Live at the Roundhouse) (recorded 2016)
- Biffy Clyro: MTV Unplugged (Live at Roundhouse, London) (recorded 2017)
- Skids: Live in London (2017)
- Nick Mason's Saucerful of Secrets: Live at The Roundhouse (2020)
- Ben Böhmer: Live at The Roundhouse, London (2022)
- Tinlicker: Live at The Roundhouse (2023)
