= Chuck McDermott =

American singer

Charles McDermott
- Also known as: Chuck McDermott
- Genres: Country, rock
- Occupations: Singer, songwriter, politician
- Years active: 1970–present
- Labels: Sunstorm Records; Polydor; Back Door Records

Charles McDermott, better-known by his stage name Chuck McDermott, is an American singer, songwriter and lyricist with a side history in political activism. He is known for writing and contributing to a variety of vinyl records and Spotify albums, for contributing two songs to the soundtrack for the 1982 Canadian horror film The Rats, and for his collaborations with musician John Stewart.

== Personal life ==
McDermott's date of birth and age are unknown. Born in the city of Chicago but raised in Dubuque, Iowa, he attended Yale University for two years before branching out into a professional music career that began in Boston, Massachusetts. Much of his early music was based in country and folk rock influences. McDermott lives in Cohasset, Massachusetts as of 2022. Other notable life events include McDermott's brief work on Ted Kennedy's presidential campaign. He is politically involved in environmentalism, finance and energy issues, which he prioritized over his musical career for the most part between the 1980s and 2010s. Although he had dropped out of Yale before completing a university career, McDermott was able to find work as a staff member in the US House of Representatives.

== 1970s ==
McDermott's 1970s period of work was largely with his first band, a country group called "Chuck McDermott and Wheatstraw". The band focused on mostly live performances contained to venues in the United States, mainly in Boston. While McDeromtt was met with acclaim, the band itself was criticized for lacking the general charisma that McDermott carried. Despite this, Chuck McDermott and Wheatstraw released three vinyl records through label Back Door Records, one of which was a 7" single, and the other two of which were LP albums. The band ceased to be active in the late 1970s.

During the disbanding of Chuck McDermott and Wheatstraw, McDermott worked as a political staffer for the Kennedy Family during a presidential campaign. McDermott described his involvement in politics as fulfilling, stating that "all that work has been very gratifying and I'm proud of it. But nothing I've ever done touches me in the place that my music does." McDermott went on to describe how the satisfaction of song writing, and the feeling community arising from live performances, rang "the louder bell".

== 1980s ==
McDermott toured in the United States and the Canadian province of Quebec in the 1980s with his new band, The Chuck McDermott Band. While in Canada, the group contributed two songs that were featured in the soundtrack of Robert Clouse's horror film The Rats (known in America as Deadly Eyes). One of these songs, a slow romantic rock song titled "So Right", was later featured on the B-side of McDermott's album The Turning Of The Wheel, which was released in 1986. The other song featured in the film, a faster party rock song titled "Lolita", was never released on any commercially available album. The only known existing version of the song is that which is featured in a scene of The Rats, during which the film's characters speak heavily over it.

Alongside McDermott's contributions to The Rats soundtrack, he also began collaborating extensively in the 1980s with fellow musician John Stewart. They released an album together, titled Blondes, that was released in 1982 by Polydor. The album was praised by Billboard for its innovative style.

== Later career ==
McDermott collaborated with John Stewart on a second album, a recording of an earlier concert, released in 2011 under the title Illinois Rain - In Concert June 22, 1984. By the 2010s, McDermott had become a solo artist, releasing two separate albums titled Gin & Rosewater (2017) and 38 Degrees and Raining (2021). Unlike his previous albums, these albums were never released on vinyl, but were made available on CD, Spotify and SoundCloud.

Chuck was an inductee into the Massachusetts Country Music Hall of Fame in 2015.

== Discography ==
=== Solo albums ===
Year	Title	Format
1986	The Turning of the Wheel	Vinyl
2017	Gin & Rosewater	CD, MP3, digital streaming
2021	38 Degrees and Raining	CD, MP3, digital streaming

=== Chuck McDermott and Wheatstraw ===
Year	Title	Format
1976	Last Straw	Vinyl
1976	I Can't Appreciate Automobiles (7", Single)	Vinyl
1977	Follow The Music	Vinyl

=== Collaborations with John Stewart ===
Year	Title	Format
1982	Blondes	Vinyl
2011	Illinois Rain - In Concert June 22, 1984	CD

=== The Chuck McDermott Band (single songs) ===
- "Lolita" (1982) - unreleased
- "So Right" (1982) - vinyl (see The Turning of the Wheel)

== See also ==
- John Stewart (musician)
