= John Stewart in Concert =

John Stewart In Concert

Live album by John Stewart
- Released: February 1980
- Recorded: March 1974
- Genre: Rock, pop
- Length: 32:17
- Label: RCA
- Producer: Nikolas K. Venet

John Stewart chronology
Bombs Away Dream Babies (1979)	John Stewart In Concert (1980)	Forgotten Songs of Some Old Yesterday (1980)

Professional ratings
Review scores
Source	Rating
Allmusic	link

John Stewart In Concert is a 1980 remixed reissue of eight tracks from the John Stewart 1974 live album The Phoenix Concerts plus two unreleased live tracks from the same concerts.

== Track listing ==
All compositions by John Stewart
Side one

1. "Wheatfield Lady" – 2:15
2. "Kansas Rain" – 2:33
3. "You Can't Look Back" – 1:35
4. "Kansas" – 3:35
5. "California Bloodlines" – 3:36

Side two

1. "Mother Country" – 5:38
2. "Oldest Living Son" – 2:50
3. "July, You're a Woman" – 3:30
4. "Freeway Pleasure" (previously unreleased) – 2:45
5. "Let the Big Horse Run" (previously unreleased) – 4:00

== Personnel ==
- John Stewart – electric guitar, acoustic guitar
- Arnie Moore - bass
- Jonathan Douglas - organ, congas, piano
- Loren Newkirk - piano, organ
- Jim Gordon - drums
- Michael Stewart - rhythm guitar
- Dan Dugmore - pedal steel guitar, electric guitar
- Mike Settle - vocals
- Denny Brooks - vocals
- Buffy Ford - vocals

=== Additional personnel ===
- Nikolas Venet - producer
- Tim Bryant - art direction
- Paul Gross - album design
- Marge Meoli - A&R coordinator
