= Dream Babies Go Hollywood =

Studio album by John Stewart
- Released: March 1980
- Genre: Folk, pop, rock
- Length: 36:00
- Label: RSO
- Producer: John Stewart

John Stewart chronology
| Forgotten Songs of Some Old Yesterday (1980) | Dream Babies Go Hollywood (1980) | Blondes (1982) |

Professional ratings
Review scores
| Source | Rating |
|---|---|
| Allmusic | 4/5 stars |

Dream Babies Go Hollywood is a studio album released in 1980 by folk musician John Stewart, former member of The Kingston Trio. This was Stewart's first studio album since Bombs Away Dream Babies, his biggest commercial success as a solo musician.

== Track listing ==
All compositions by John Stewart

- Side one
1. "Hollywood Dreams" – 2:50
2. "Wind on the River" – 4:16
3. "Wheels of Thunder" – 3:25
4. "Monterey" – 3:23
5. "(Odin) Spirit of the Water" – 4:35
- Side two
1. "Lady of Fame" – 4:13
2. "The Raven" – 4:45
3. "Love Has Tied My Wings" – 3:17
4. "Nightman" – 3:28
5. "Moonlight Rider" – 1:48

== Personnel ==
- John Stewart – vocals, guitar, percussion
- Chris Whelan – bass guitar, vocals
- Joey Carbone – keyboards
- Henry Diltz – vocals
- Phil Everly – vocals
- Sydney Fox – vocals
- Jo Ann Harris – vocals
- Nicolette Larson – vocals
- Linda Ronstadt – vocals
- Blaise Tosti – vocals
- Wendy Waldman – vocals
- Russ Kunkel – drums, percussion
- David Platshon – drums
- Steve Ross – percussion

== Charts ==
| Chart (1980) | Peak position |
|---|---|
| Australia (Kent Music Report) | 86 |
