= Buffy Ford Stewart =

American singer-songwriter

- Genres: Folk music
- Occupation: Musician
- Instruments: Guitar, vocals
- Years active: 1968–present
- Labels: Neon Dreams Music, Global Recording Artists
- Website: buffyfordstewart.com

Buffy Ford Stewart is an American singer, guitarist, and songwriter. She is best known for her solo work, and her work with John Stewart.

== Biography ==
=== Buffy Ford and John Stewart ===
Buffy and John met in 1967 when John left the Kingston Trio and sought a female singing partner. After George Yanuk told John about Buffy, John saw her perform in a musical comedy show at the Festival Theatre in San Anselmo, California. He then offered her the job. Jefferson Airplane was also interested in her as a vocalist, but she chose to work with John.

John and Buffy were a part of Robert F. Kennedy's 1968 presidential campaign. At each stop, they would sing songs before Kennedy gave a talk.

In 1968, Buffy and John recorded the album Signals Through the Glass. This album included the song "July, You're a Woman," which John also recorded for his 1969 album California Bloodlines.

John and Buffy married in 1975. John considered Buffy to be his muse and inspiration for many of his songs. He called her "Angel Rain".

Together, John and Buffy recorded and released Live at the Turf Inn, Scotland in 1996, with four of Buffy's solo performances. It was initially released as The Essential John and Buffy.

They also recorded John Stewart & Darwin's Army in 1999 with Dave Crossland and John Hoke, an album of acoustic traditional music with drum accompaniment.

=== Solo career ===
Buffy's 2012 album Same Old Heart, produced by Craig Caffall, featured the final vocal performance by the late Davy Jones on John Stewart's song "Daydream Believer" which had been originally recorded by The Monkees. Other guests included Peter Tork, Rosanne Cash, Maura Kennedy, Kris Kristofferson, Eliza Gilkyson, Timothy B Schmit, Dan Hicks, and Nanci Griffith. Henry Diltz shot the album cover photographs.

Her 2015 EP Angel Rain was co-produced by Buffy and Ari Rios, and contains four original songs as well as her version of John's song "Little Road and a Stone to Roll."

=== Other projects ===
Buffy has recently finished writing a children’s book: The Blanket and the Bear.

Buffy is also working on a documentary about John's life, titled The Ghost of Daydream Believer: John Stewart's American Spirit.

=== Personal life ===
Buffy has battled cancer and brain tumors, and experienced hip and knee replacements over the years.

John Stewart died in San Diego in 2008. John and Buffy had one son Luke, and three children from John's previous marriage: Jeremy, Amy, and Mikael (a sound technician).

== Discography ==
=== Solo albums ===
- 2013: Same Old Heart (CD Baby)
- 2013: Buffy's Christmas Album (Global Recording Artists)
- 2015: Angel Rain EP (Global Recording Artists)
- 2017: Once Upon a Time (CD Baby)

=== Buffy Ford and Nirmala Kate Heriza ===
- 2004: Hearts Together (Neon Dreams)

=== With John Stewart ===
- 1968: Signals Through The Glass (Capitol) as John Stewart and Buffy Ford
- 1970: Willard (Capitol)
- 1971: The Lonesome Picker Rides Again (Warner Bros.)
- 1972: Sunstorm (Warner Bros.)
- 1973: Cannons in the Rain (RCA Victor)
- 1974: The Phoenix Concerts (RCA Victor) - reissued in different configuration in 1980 as John Stewart in Concert and in 1990 by Bear Family as The Complete Phoenix Concerts
- 1977: Fire In The Wind (RSO)
- 1979: Bombs Away Dream Babies (RSO)
- 1987: Punch the Big Guy (Cypress)
- 1984: Trancas (Affordable Dreams)
- 1992: Bullets in the Hour Glass (Shanachie)
- 1995: Airdream Believer (Shanachie)
- 1996: Live At The Turf Inn, Scotland (Folk Era) John Stewart and Buffy Ford - originally issued in 1994 as The Essential John & Buffy
- 1996: An American Folk Song Anthology (Laserlight)
- 1996: American Journey (Laserlight)
- 1997: Rough Sketches (Folk Era)
- 2002: The Last Campaign (Laserlight)
- 2003: Havana (Appleseed)
- 2006: The Day the River Sang (Appleseed)

=== Also appeared on ===
- 1974: John Denver - Back Home Again (RCA Victor)
