= Middle Earth (club) =

Countercultural music venue in 1960s London

Coordinates: 51.5121°N 0.1239°W

Middle Earth (formerly Electric Garden Club) was a hippie club in London, England, in the mid-to-late 1960s. It was a successor to the UFO Club, which had closed down due to police pressure and the imprisonment of its founder John Hopkins.

Middle Earth was located in a large cellar at 43 King Street, in Covent Garden. It was a competitor to the Roundhouse at Chalk Farm, and after the King Street closure in 1968 it relocated there.

== Events ==
Nights at Middle Earth were normally hosted and arranged by the DJ and promoter Jeff Dexter. Groups that played there included Pink Floyd, The Who, the Jimmy Page-era Yardbirds, Roy Harper, The Crazy World of Arthur Brown, July, The Bonzo Dog Doo-Dah Band, David Bowie's folk trio Feathers, The Move, The Pretty Things, Fairport Convention and Jefferson Airplane, Eric Burdon and Captain Beefheart. The Byrds also played here twice with Gram Parsons. The main groups playing on a regular basis were Soft Machine, Tomorrow, Sam Gopal's Dream, Tyrannosaurus Rex with Marc Bolan and Steve Peregrin Took (whose 23 September 1967 concert at the venue was released as the 2000 live album There Was A Time), Social Deviants, the pre-Yes Mabel Greer's Toyshop and the Graham Bond Organisation who was a regular visitor and performer. Others included The Exploding Galaxy dance group, and The Tribe of the Sacred Mushroom, who, headed by Lin Darnton, had performed a play based on the Tibetan Book of the Dead. John Peel was a disc jockey at the club on Saturday nights until mid-1968.

The club saw several drug raids by the police during which underage revelers were arrested. During two raids on the club, one of which occurred during a performance of the play based on the Tibetan Book of the Dead, two girls were arrested for being underage, and a member of The Graham Bond Organization was arrested for possession. Sam Gopal's Dream was due to perform on the night of one of the raids, and were in the dressing room with Graham Bond when the police raided the club. A device called the "Trip Machine" was also dismantled and taken away by the police.

== Relocation ==
The club was closed down in mid-1968 and after holding events at a few venues settled at the Roundhouse where it put on The Doors and Jefferson Airplane for four performances over two nights in September 1968. Led Zeppelin played their first public performance there on Saturday 9 November 1968.
