= Signals Through the Glass =

Studio album by John Stewart and Buffy Ford
- Released: September 1968
- Genre: Folk, rock
- Length: 32:16
- Label: Capitol
- Producer: Voyle Gilmore

John Stewart chronology
Signals Through the Glass (1968)	California Bloodlines (1969)

Professional ratings
Review scores
Source	Rating
Allmusic	4/5 stars

Signals Through the Glass is the first solo album by John Stewart, recorded with his future wife Buffy Ford, originally issued on LP in September 1968 and reissued in September 1975 with a different version of "July, You're A Woman". It has since also been released on CD. "July, You're A Woman" was re-recorded by Stewart on his next album, California Bloodlines.

== Track listing ==
All compositions by John Stewart.

=== Side one ===
1. "Lincoln's Train" – 2:57
2. "Holly on my Mind" – 3:01
3. "Mucky Truckee River" – 3:24
4. "Nebraska Widow" – 3:41
5. "July, You're a Woman" – 3:15

=== Side two ===
1. "Dark Prairie" – 4:13
2. "Santa Barbara" – 2:48
3. "Cody" – 2:57
4. "Signals To Ludi" – 3:05
5. "Draft Age" – 2:55
