= Revenge of the Budgie =

Revenge of The Budgie

Studio album by Nick Reynolds and John Stewart
- Released: November 1983
- Recorded: Shangri-La Studios, Malibu, Calif.
- Genre: Folk
- Length: 22:50
- Label: Takoma
- Producer: The Puppy Bros.

John Stewart chronology
Blondes (1982)	Revenge of The Budgie (1983)	Trancas (1984)

Professional ratings
Review scores
Source	Rating
Allmusic	2/5 stars

Revenge of The Budgie is an album released in 1983 by Nick Reynolds and John Stewart, both former members of The Kingston Trio.

This album was later made available as songs 11 through 17, combined with the Trio Years cassette in 1993 on a CD by Folk Era, called Chilly Winds.

== Track listing ==
All compositions by John Stewart, except where indicated.

- Side one
1. "Buddy Won't You Roll Down the Line" (Traditional; arranged by Nick Reynolds & John Stewart) – 3:46
2. "Dreamers on the Rise" – 2:40
3. "Cheyenne" – 2:46
- Side two
1. "Living on Easy" (Traditional; arranged by Nick Reynolds & John Stewart) – 2:36
2. "Hiding in the Shadows" (Lindsey Buckingham, John Stewart) – 4:08
3. "Angel on the Road Shoulder" – 2:49
4. "Same Old Heart" – 4:05

== Personnel ==
- John Stewart – vocals, guitars, bass, keyboards
- Nick Reynolds – vocals, 8 string tenor guitar, congas
- Lindsey Buckingham – slide guitar ("Living On Easy"), various guitars ("Same Old Heart"), all guitars & percussion ("Hiding In The Shadows"), vocals ("Buddy Won't You Roll Down The Line")
- Gary Busey – vocals ("Buddy Won't You Roll Down The Line")
