= Blondes (John Stewart album) =

Studio album by John Stewart
- Released: 1982
- Recorded: 1981
- Genre: Folk
- Length: 40:17
- Label: Allegiance (US release); Polydor (Swedish release)
- Producer: John Stewart

John Stewart chronology
Dream Babies Go Hollywood (1980)	Blondes (1982)	Revenge of the Budgie (1983)

Professional ratings
Review scores
Source	Rating
Allmusic	2/5 stars

Blondes is a studio album released in 1982 by folk musician John Stewart, a former member of The Kingston Trio. The LP was released with slightly different US and Swedish track listings.

The liner notes of the US release state:

"This record is dedicated to John S. Stewart"

The Swedish album was released on Polydor and is credited to "John Stewart with Chuck McDermott." The Swedish release contains remixes of all the songs from the US release except "Angeles," which is not included. It also contains the following additional songs: "All the Desperate Men," "Same Old Heart," and "When the Night Was Ours."

== Track listing (US release) ==
All compositions by John Stewart.

- Side one
1. "Tall Blondes" – 3:02
2. "The Queen of Hollywood High" – 4:03
3. "Girl Down the River" – 4:35
4. "The Eyes of Sweet Virginia" – 3:52
5. "Judy in G Major" – 3:57
- Side two
1. "You Won't Be Going Home" – 3:52
2. "Jenny was a Dream Girl" – 3:45
3. "Blonde Star" – 4:02
4. "Golden Gate" – 3:46
5. "Angeles (City of The Angels)"* – 5:23

Running time: 40:17

(* denotes track not released on the Swedish release)

== Track listing (Swedish release) ==
All compositions by John Stewart.

- Side one
1. "All the Desperate Men"* – 3:37
2. "Tall Blondes" – 3:05
3. "The Queen of Hollywood High" – 4:03
4. "Girl Down the River" – 4:38
5. "The Eyes of Sweet Virginia" – 4:04
6. "Judy in G Major" – 3:55
- Side two
1. "You Won't Be Going Home" – 3:55
2. "Jenny was a Dream Girl" – 4:11
3. "Same Old Heart"* – 3:55
4. "When The Night was Ours"* – 3:06
5. "Golden Gate" – 4:26
6. "Blonde Star" – 4:07

Running time: 47:02

(* denotes tracks not released on the US release)

== The Complete Blondes ==
In 2003, John Stewart reissued all the tracks from both the US and Swedish releases on a CD on his own label, Neon Dreams.

1. "Tall Blondes"
2. "The Queen of Hollywood High"
3. "Girl Down the River"
4. "The Eyes of Sweet Virginia"
5. "Judy in G Major"
6. "You Won't Be Going Home"
7. "Jenny Was a Dream Girl"
8. "Blonde Star"
9. "Golden Gate"
10. "Angeles (The City of the Angels)"
11. "All the Desperate Men"
12. "Same Old Heart"
13. "When the Night Was Ours"

== Personnel ==
- John Stewart – vocals, lead guitar, bass guitar
- Chuck McDermott – vocals, rhythm guitar
- Chris Whalen – bass guitar
- Roy Ohari – bass guitar
- Bill Mutter – drums, percussion
- Larry Greenstein – percussion
- Dennis Kenmore – percussion
- Lindsey Buckingham – background vocals on "Jenny was a Dream Girl"
- Linda Ronstadt – background vocals on "The Queen of Hollywood High"

Additional personnel

- Chuck McDermott – production assistant
- Larry Greenstein – recording
- Kim Harwood – front and back cover photographs
