= Willard (album) =

Studio album by John Stewart
- Released: July 1970
- Genre: Folk
- Length: 40:24
- Label: Capitol
- Producer: Peter Asher

John Stewart chronology
California Bloodlines (1969)	Willard (1970)	The Lonesome Picker Rides Again (1971)

Professional ratings
Review scores
Source	Rating
Allmusic	5/5 stars

Willard is the third studio album by folk artist John Stewart, former member of The Kingston Trio. It was released in 1970 on Capitol Records. The album was recorded at Crystal Sound, Hollywood, California and Woodland Studios, Nashville, Tennessee.

== Track listing ==
All compositions by John Stewart.

=== Side one ===
1. "Big Joe" – 3:11
2. "Julie, Judy, Angel Rain" – 2:58
3. "Belly Full of Tennessee" – 2:43
4. "Friend of Jesus" – 2:19
5. "Clack Clack" – 2:18
6. "Hero From the War" – 2:19
7. "Back in Pomona" – 2:21

=== Side two ===
1. "Willard" – 3:29
2. "Golden Rollin' Belly" – 3:04
3. "All American Girl" – 2:13
4. "Oldest Living Son" – 3:12
5. "Earth Rider" – 2:46
6. "Great White Cathedrals" – 1:57
7. "Marshall Wind" – 5:34

Royalties for track 1:5 go to the Robert F. Kennedy Memorial Foundation.

== Personnel ==
- John Stewart – acoustic guitar (tracks 1:1, 1:7, 2:2, 2:3, 2:4, 2:5), guitar (tracks 1:2, 1:3, 1:4, 1:5, 2:1, 2:6, 2:7), 12-string guitar (track 1:6), auto harp (track 1:6), boxes (track 1:7)
- James Taylor - acoustic guitar (tracks 1:1, 1:5, 2:3, 2:4), background vocals (track 1:1)
- Joel Bishop O'Brien - drums (tracks 1:1, 2:7), conga (track 1:7)
- Russ Kunkel - knees (tracks 1:1, 2:1), drums (tracks 1:2, 1:4, 1:5, 1:7, 2:2, 2:3, 2:4, 2:7), boxes (track 1:7)
- Bill Mumy - cow bell (track 1:1)
- Peter Asher - background vocals (tracks 1:1, 1:4, 1:5, 1:7, 2:2, 2:3, 2:4), tambourine (track 1:4), bass (track 1:5), auto harp (track 2:6)
- Bryan Garofalo - bass (tracks 1:1, 1:2, 1:4, 2:1, 2:2, 2:3, 2:7), background vocals (tracks 1:1, 1:4, 1:7, 2:2, 2:3)
- Carole King - piano (tracks 1:2, 2:7)
- Mike Stewart - guitar (track 1:2)
- Doug Kershaw - fiddle (track 1:3), background vocals (track 1:3)
- Kenneth "Down wind" Buttrey – drums (track 1:3), knees (track 2:5)
- Norbert "Home town" Putnam – bass (tracks 1:3, 2:5)
- Bobby Thompson - banjo (track 1:3)
- Ralph Schuckett - piano (track 1:4), harmonium (track 1:4)
- Buffy Ford - background vocals (track 1:4)
- Abigale Haness - background vocals (track 1:4)
- Danny Kooch - electric guitar (tracks 1:7, 2:2, 2:7)
- Chris Darrow - fiddle (tracks 2:1, 2:2)
- Fred "The Flash" Carter - acoustic guitar (track 2:5)
- "Goodtime" Charlie McCoy – harp (track 2:5)
- The People - background vocals (track 2:7)

=== Additional personnel ===
- Peter Asher - producer
- John Andrew Tartaglia - orchestration
- James Wyeth - cover drawing
- Henry Diltz – insert photos
- Richard Sanford Orshoff - engineer
- Robert Paull - second engineer
