= John Tobler =

British music journalist

John Hugen Tobler (born 9 May 1943) is a British rock music journalist, writer, occasional broadcaster, and record company executive.

With Pete Frame, he was one of the founders of ZigZag magazine in April 1969. The magazine focused on the "underground" music scene of the time and featured Tobler's interviews with many of the leading rock and folk musicians of the period, both American and British. He continued to write for ZigZag until the 1980s, and for many other music magazines since then.

His books include 25 Years of Rock (1980, with Pete Frame), The Record Producers (1982, with Stuart Grundy), MTV Music Television: Who's Who in Rock Video (1984), The Buddy Holly Story (1989), The Rock Lists Album (1989, with Alan Jones), Who's Who in Rock and Roll (1991), 100 Great Albums of the Sixties (1994), and Brian Wilson and the Beach Boys: A Complete Guide (2004: with Andrew G. Doe). He has also written innumerable liner notes for record reissues and compilations.

He currently runs the Road Goes On Forever (RGF) record label, based in Washington, Tyne and Wear, England.
