= Gold (John Stewart song) =

Single by John Stewart

from the album Bombs Away Dream Babies
- B-side: "Comin' Out of Nowhere"
- Released: May 1979 (U.S.)
- Genre: Blues rock
- Length: 4:25
- Label: RSO
- Songwriter: John Stewart
- Producer: John Stewart

John Stewart singles chronology
"Armstrong" (1969)	"Gold" (1979)	"Midnight Wind" (1979)

Alternative cover

"Gold" is a song written and recorded by John Stewart in 1979. It was the lead single and biggest hit among three Top 40 singles released from his LP, Bombs Away Dream Babies. The song was Stewart's first US Top 40 hit, as well as his first chart single in a decade (since "Armstrong" which peaked at #74 in 1969). Stevie Nicks is featured on backing vocals.

"Gold" became a top-five hit in the United States, Canada and Australia. It also charted in the UK and New Zealand although not as high.

== Background ==
Stewart wrote the song some time after he left the folk group Kingston Trio. The song is from the album Bombs Away Dream Babies, to which Nicks and Lindsey Buckingham contributed. (Although the guitar solo in "Gold" is similar in style to Buckingham's, it was actually played by Stewart.) The song has a smooth funk/pop rhythm.

The song takes a light-hearted but cynical view of the recording industry in Los Angeles; in time, Stewart would feel the same way about the song itself. He would eventually stop performing "Gold" in concert, calling it "vapid" and "empty" and meaning nothing to him, having done it for the money and to please his record company.

== Personnel ==
- John Stewart – vocals, guitar
- Lindsey Buckingham – guitar
- Bryan Garofalo - bass
- Joey Carbone - keyboards
- Mike Botts - drums
- Stevie Nicks – additional vocals
- Mary Torrey – additional vocals

== Chart history ==
=== Weekly charts ===
Chart (1979)	Peak position
Australia (Kent Music Report)	5
Canada RPM Top Singles	4
New Zealand (Recorded Music NZ)	13
UK Singles (Official Charts)	43
US Billboard Hot 100	5
US Adult Contemporary (Billboard)	42
US Cash Box Top 100	6

=== Year-end charts ===
Chart (1979)	Rank
Australia (Kent Music Report)	38
Canada	24
US Billboard Hot 100	51
US Cash Box	35

== See also ==
- List of 1970s one-hit wonders in the United States
