= Fire in the Wind =

Studio album by John Stewart
- Released: 1977
- Genre: Folk
- Length: 32:02 (LP)
- Label: RSO
- Producer: John Stewart, Mentor Williams

John Stewart chronology
Wingless Angels (1975)	Fire in the Wind (1977)	Bombs Away Dream Babies (1979)

Professional ratings
Review scores
Source	Rating
Allmusic	2/5 stars

Fire in the Wind is the ninth studio album by the folk artist John Stewart, former member of The Kingston Trio. It was released in 1977 on RSO Records. The album was re-released on CD on the Wrasse label in 2001 with five bonus tracks.

== Track listing ==
All compositions by John Stewart except where noted.
Side one

1. "Fire in the Wind" – 3:40
2. "Rock It in My Own Sweet Time" – 3:55
3. "On You Like the Wind" – 3:04
4. "The Runner" – 3:37
5. "Morning Thunder" – 3:21

Side two

1. "Promise the Wind" – 2:28
2. "Boston Lady" – 3:08
3. "18 Wheels" – 2:43
4. "The Last Hurrah" – 2:28
5. "The Wild Side of You" – 3:38
- Tracks 1-2, 1-4, 2-1, 2-5 produced by Mentor Williams
- Tracks 1-1, 1-3, 2-3 produced by Mentor Williams with John Stewart
- Tracks 1-5, 2-2, 2-4 produced by John Stewart
- Mixed by Michael Stewart with John Stewart and Rick Ruggieri at Producers Workshop, Los Angeles, California

=== CD bonus tracks ===
1. "Where the Wind Can't Find Me" – 3:23
2. "The Old Gunfighter" – 3:07
3. "The Sun Flies Shining" – 2:50
4. "Zapata's Own Comrades" – 3:02
5. "Auld Lang Syne" (Robert Burns, Traditional) – 3:58

== Personnel ==
- John Stewart - guitar
- Jon Woodhead - guitar
- Troy Seals - guitar
- Reggie Young - guitar
- Joey Harris - guitar, background vocals
- Dave Kirby - guitar
- Shane Keister - keyboard
- David Briggs - keyboard
- Bill Cuomo - keyboard
- Mickey Raphael - harmonica
- Gary Weisberg - percussion, drums
- Kenneth Buttrey - drums
- Chris Whalen - bass, background vocals
- John Williams - bass
- Buffy Ford Stewart - background vocals
- Herb Pederson - background vocals
- Denny Brooks - background vocals

=== Additional personnel ===
- John Stewart - producer
- Mentor Williams - producer
- Arthor von Blomberg - executive producer
- Susan Herr - art direction
- Tom Nikosey - design
- Norman Seeff - photography
- Gene Eichelberger - engineer (Quadrafonic Studios)
- Rick Porter - engineer (A&M Recording Studios)
- Stuart Taylor - engineer (The Enctron Truck)
- Tony McCashen - engineer (Quad Teck Recording Studios)
- Steven Barncard - engineer (The Village Recorders)
