= Departure (Pat Boone album) =

Studio album by Pat Boone
- Released: 1969
- Genre: Pop
- Length: 41:14
- Label: Tetragrammaton

Pat Boone chronology
Look Ahead (1968)	Departure (1969)	Songs for Jesus Folk (1970)

Singles from Departure
- 1. "July, You're a Woman" Released: March 1969

Professional ratings
Review scores
Source	Rating
AllMusic	2.5/5 stars
Billboard	positive ("Spotlight" pick)

Departure is the 39th studio album by Pat Boone, released in 1969 on the short-lived Tetragrammaton Records.

== Reception ==
Billboard picked the album for its "Album Reviews" section, noting that it was a commercial package.

Arthur Rowe on AllMusic wrote "...There's no problem with the material, per se, but the finished sound does not really sound finished."

== Track listing ==
Side one
No.	Title	Writer(s)	Length
1.	"What's Gnawing at Me"	Biff Rose	3:50
2.	"July, You're a Woman"	John C. Stewart	3:05
3.	"Within My Own Time"	Roger Dollarhide	3:12
4.	"Song of the Siren"	Tim Buckley	3:04
5.	"Molly"	Biff Rose	4:03
6.	"Never Goin' Back"	John C. Stewart	3:07

Side two
No.	Title	Writer(s)	Length
1.	"Long Distance"	Mike McRae	3:15
2.	"No Playing in the Snow"	John D. Loudermilk	3:14
3.	"I've Got a Secret"	Fred Neil	3:22
4.	"Bad News"	John D. Loudermilk	3:34
5.	"Break My Mind"	John D. Loudermilk	3:57
6.	"Friends"	Roger Dollarhide	3:31
