= California Bloodlines =

Studio album by John Stewart
- Released: May 1969
- Recorded: February 1969
- Genre: Folk, alternative country
- Length: 41:31
- Label: Capitol
- Producer: Nik Venet

John Stewart chronology
Signals Through the Glass (1968)	California Bloodlines (1969)	Willard (1970)

Professional ratings
Review scores
Source	Rating
Allmusic	link

California Bloodlines is the second album by folk musician John Stewart, former member of The Kingston Trio. This record, which was considered by many to be Stewart's signature album, was recorded in Nashville. Stewart used some of the same musicians who performed on Bob Dylan's Nashville Skyline, which was recorded at the same studio. The album was ranked number 36 among the top 200 albums of all time by rock critics in 1978.

Originally issued on Capitol in May 1969 as an LP, the album was reissued several times. It was re-released on CD by Bear Family Records (paired with the album Willard) in 1989 under the title California Bloodlines/Willard minus 2. An LP, entitled California Bloodlines Plus..., which contains additional tracks taken from Willard, also was issued.

The song "Mother Country" was played during the space flight of the Apollo 11 mission and was thus featured in the 2019 documentary Apollo 11.

== Track listing ==
All compositions by John Stewart.

=== Side one ===
1. "California Bloodlines" – 3:11
2. "Razor-Back Woman" – 2:25
3. "She Believes in Me" – 2:34
4. "Omaha Rainbow" – 3:06
5. "The Pirates of Stone County Road" – 4:50
6. "Shackles and Chains" – 2:53

=== Side two ===
1. "Mother Country" – 4:48
2. "Some Lonesome Picker" – 3:11
3. "You Can't Look Back" – 1:59
4. "Missouri Birds" – 3:25
5. "July, You're a Woman" – 3:12
6. "Never Goin' Back" – 4:57

== Personnel ==
- John Stewart – guitar
- Kenneth A. Buttrey – drums
- Fred Carter Jr. – guitar
- Norbert Putnam – bass
- Charlie McCoy – harmonica
- Lloyd Green – pedal steel
- Hargus "Pig" Robbins – piano
- John "Bucky" Wilkin - guitar
- Beegie Cruzer Adair - piano

=== Additional personnel ===
- Nik Venet - producer
- Rick Rankin - cover photo
- Henry Diltz – liner photo
