= The Lonesome Picker Rides Again =

Studio album by John Stewart
- Released: November 1971
- Genre: Folk
- Length: 39:30
- Label: Warner Bros.
- Producer: Michael Stewart

John Stewart chronology
Willard (1970)	The Lonesome Picker Rides Again (1971)	Sunstorm (1972)

Professional ratings
Review scores
Source	Rating
Allmusic	4.5/5 stars

The Lonesome Picker Rides Again is the fourth album by the folk musician John Stewart, a former member of The Kingston Trio, released in 1971. The album contains Stewart's own recording of "Daydream Believer", a song he wrote for The Monkees. Their version was released as a single and reached the number one in the U.S. Billboard Hot 100 chart in December 1967, remaining there for four weeks.

== Track listing ==
All compositions by John Stewart.

=== Side one ===
1. "Just an Old Love Song" – 3:15
2. "The Road Shines Bright" – 2:35
3. "Touch of the Sun" – 3:06
4. "Bolinas" – 3:18
5. "Freeway Pleasure" – 3:14
6. "Swift Lizard" – 3:22

=== Side two ===
1. "Wolves in the Kitchen" – 3:25
2. "Little Road and a Stone to Roll" – 2:52
3. "Daydream Believer" – 3:28
4. "Crazy" – 3:27
5. "Wild Horse Road" – 2:50
6. "All the Brave Horses" – 4:38

Recorded at Western Recorders and Crystal Sound in Hollywood, except for tracks 1:6 and 2:1 which were recorded live at Chuck's Cellar in Los Altos, California, on 29 May 1971 by Wally Heider. The location engineer was Ray Thompson. The album was mixed at Independence Recorders in Studio City, California.

== Personnel ==
- John Stewart – vocals, guitar
- Russ Kunkel – drums
- Peter Asher – vocals
- Bryan Garofalo – bass guitar
- Michael Stewart – vocals
- Jennifer Warnes - vocals
- Buffy Ford – vocals
- Chris Darrow – banjo, electric dobro
- Fred Carter Jr. – guitar
- Henry Diltz – harmonica
- Buddy Emmons – steel guitar
- Glen Hardin – piano
- King Errisson – conga
- Leland Sklar – bass

=== Production personnel ===
- Mike Stewart - producer
- Ron Malo - productions engineer, mixdown engineer
- Richard Sanford Orshoff - productions engineer
- Jimmie Haskell - orchestration
- Henry Diltz - photography
- David Clarke - art direction
