= Punch the Big Guy =

Studio album by John Stewart
- Released: 1987
- Genre: Folk, folk rock
- Label: The Ship/Cypress

John Stewart chronology
| The Last Campaign (1985) | Punch the Big Guy (1987) | The Complete Phoenix Concerts (1990) |

Punch the Big Guy is an album by the American musician John Stewart, released in 1987. The album title was suggested by Stewart's son. Stewart supported the album with a North American tour. Punch the Big Guy was a commercial disappointment, selling around 25,000 in its first six months of release.

== Production ==
Recorded in Malibu, Nashville, and Denver (on a Fostex B-16), Stewart spent $50,000 on the sessions. He wrote the album's songs to appeal specifically to baby boomers. Most of the songs deal with societal and personal problems; Stewart decided not to include songs with a lighter tone. He was backed by members of New Grass Revival on several tracks. Rosanne Cash contributed backing vocals on "Angels with Guns" and "Price of the Fire".

== Critical reception ==
Professional ratings
Review scores
| Source | Rating |
|---|---|
| AllMusic | 4.5/5 stars |
| MusicHound Rock: The Essential Album Guide | 3/5 stars |

The Washington Post wrote that "the songs are doomed by their liberal breast-beating and vacuous mysticism." The Los Angeles Times concluded that "this record is generally so humorless that Stewart often reminds you of a door-to-door proselytizer who won't go away." The Chicago Tribune deemed the album "gentle folk songs with hard-bitten lyrics."

The Advocate opined that "parts of the album have a certain charm, but it's unlikely to provide any excitement for those who haven't kept up with his previous music." The Denver Post labeled Punch the Big Guy "one of the finest folk-rock albums of the 1980s, an overlooked gem of evocative lyrics and striking melodies." The Arizona Republic praised the "odd mixture of '50s/'60s folk, '70s sensibilities and righteous back beat."

AllMusic wrote that "Stewart achieves a genuine merger of the personal, the spiritual, and the political on Punch the Big Guy and wraps it all up in a darkly colored but accessible package."

== Track listing ==
| No. | Title | Length |
|---|---|---|
| 1. | "Angels with Guns" |
| 2. | "Strange Rivers" |
| 3. | "Hunters of the Sun" |
| 4. | "Price of the Fire" |
| 5. | "Midnight of the World" |
| 6. | "Night of a Distant Star" |
| 7. | "Botswanna" |
| 8. | "Ticket to the Stars" |
| 9. | "Runaway Train" |
| 10. | "Children of the New Frontier" |
