= July, You're a Woman =

"July You're a Woman"

Single by Pat Boone

from the album Departure
- B-side: "Break My Mind"
- Released: 1969
- Recorded: 1969
- Genre: Pop
- Length: 3:01
- Label: Dot
- Songwriter(s): John C. Stewart
- Producer(s): Jerry Yester, Zal Yanovsky

Pat Boone singles chronology
"September Blue" (1968)	"July You're a Woman" (1969)	"What's Gnawing at Me" (1969)

"July, You're a Woman" is a song written by John Stewart and originally released as a duet with Buffy Ford on their 1968 album Signals Through the Glass.

Pat Boone's cover entered the Billboard Hot 100 at number 100 for one week in April 1969.

== Track listing ==
7" single (Dot 45-16122, 1960)
No.	Title	Writer(s)	Length
1.	"July You're a Woman"	John C. Stewart	3:01
2.	"Break My Mind"	John D. Loudermilk	3:57

== Charts ==
Chart (1969)	Peak position
US Billboard Hot 100	100
US Adult Contemporary (Billboard)	23
