= Sunstorm (John Stewart album) =

Studio album by John Stewart
- Released: April 1972
- Genre: Folk
- Length: 30:47
- Label: Warner Bros.
- Producer: Michael Stewart

John Stewart chronology
The Lonesome Picker Rides Again (1971)	Sunstorm (1972)	Cannons In The Rain (1973)

Professional ratings
Review scores
Source	Rating
Allmusic	3/5 stars

Sunstorm is the fifth album by folk musician John Stewart, former member of The Kingston Trio, released in 1972. It is the second of two albums released by Warner Bros. The album features Stewart’s signature lyrical style drawing inspiration from his teenage rock’n’roll days and gospel music, particularly the Staple Singers, whom he discovered through fellow Kingston Trio member Dave Guard. Stewart belts out two rockers; "Bring It On Home” and "Drive Again" but the album mostly centers on ballads with gospel undertones especially prominent on the track "Light Come Shining". The album’s sessions brought together an impressive lineup of musicians, including Glen D. Hardin, James Burton, and Jerry Scheff—all part of Elvis Presley’s band at the time. This star-studded ensemble added depth and polish to Stewart’s folk-rock vision, making Sunstorm a quietly ambitious entry in his discography.

== Track listing ==
All compositions by John Stewart except where noted.

=== Side one ===
1. "Kansas Rain" – 2:30
2. "Cheyenne" – 3:35
3. "Bring It On Home" – 2:06
4. "Sunstorm" – 2:35
5. "Arkansas Breakout" – 3:35

=== Side two ===
1. "An Account of Haley's Comet" (John Stewart, John S. Stewart) – 3:55
2. "Joe" – 3:05
3. "Light Come Shine" – 3:28
4. "Lonesome John" – 2:39
5. "Drive Again" – 3:19

Recorded at Amigo Studios, North Hollywood, and Independence Recorders, Studio City.

"An Account of Haley's Comet" features the voice of John Stewart's father, the horse trainer John S. Stewart.

== Personnel ==
- John Stewart – vocals, acoustic guitar, handclaps
- Russ Kunkel - drums
- Ron Tutt - drums
- David Kemper - drums
- Jerry Scheff - bass
- Arnie Moore - bass
- Bryan Garofalo - bass, background vocals
- Glen Hardin - piano
- Larry Knechtel - piano
- Loren Newkirk - piano
- Michael Stewart - shakers, acoustic guitar, background vocals, handclaps
- Buffy Ford - guido, background vocals
- James Burton - electric guitar, electric sitar, dobro
- Bill Cunningham - fiddle
- Henry Diltz - harmonica, background vocals
- Buddy Emmons - pedal steel
- Mike Deasy - electric guitar
- Larry Carlton - electric guitar
- King Errisson - congas, percussion
- Bill Mumy - handclaps
- Gary David - handclaps
- James Horn - horns
- Chuck Findley - horns
- Paul Hubinon - horns
- Jack Carone - background vocals
- Laura Creamer - background vocals

=== Additional personnel ===
- Michael Stewart - producer
- Ron Malo - engineer
- Glen D. Hardin - working arrangements
- Jimmie Haskell - string arrangements
- Henry Diltz - photography
- David Clarke - art direction
