= Trancas (album) =

Studio album by John Stewart
- Released: June 1984
- Recorded: Shangri-La Studios, Malibu, California
- Genre: Folk
- Length: 33:18 (LP); 41:04 (CD)
- Label: Affordable Dreams
- Producer: John Stewart

John Stewart chronology
Revenge of the Budgie (1983)	Trancas (1984)	Centennial (1984)

Professional ratings
Review scores
Source	Rating
Allmusic	2.5/5 stars

Trancas is a studio album by the folk artist John Stewart, former member of The Kingston Trio. It was released in 1984 on Affordable Dreams. This album is produced by Stewart and he also plays all the instruments except for a set of electronic Oberheim DMX drums. The album was reissued on CD in 1988 with two extra tracks recorded in April 1988.

== Track listing ==
All compositions by John Stewart, except where indicated.

- Side one
1. "It Ain't the Gold" – 2:57
2. "Reasons to Rise" – 3:29
3. "Pilots in Blue" – 3:16
4. "Chasing Down the Rain" – 3:12
5. "'Til the Lights Come Home" – 2:46
- Side two
1. "Bringing Down the Moon" – 3:03
2. "All the Lights" – 3:26
3. "Rocky Top" (Felice and Boudleaux Bryant) – 2:32
4. "The American Way" – 4:08
5. "The Chosen" – 3:37

=== CD Bonus Tracks ===
1. "Heart of a Kid" – 3:25
2. "Irresistible Targets"– 4:18

== Personnel ==
- John Stewart - vocals, all instruments
- Buffy Ford Stewart - background vocals
- Chuck McDermott - background vocals
- Teresa Tate - background vocals
- Nick Reynolds - background vocals

=== Additional personnel ===
- John Stewart - producer
- Carla Fredricks - engineer
- Fred Koch - second engineer
- Henry Diltz - photography
