= Centennial (album) =

Studio album by John Stewart
- Released: June 1984
- Recorded: Shangri-La Studios, Malibu, California
- Genre: Folk
- Length: 34:38
- Label: Homecoming Records
- Producer: John Stewart

John Stewart chronology
Trancas (1984)	Centennial (1984)	The Last Campaign (1985)

Centennial is an instrumental LP released in 1984 by John Stewart, a former member of The Kingston Trio. This album is produced by Stewart and he also plays all instruments. The album was released on Stewart's own label Homecoming Records. It is also the first part of his "American Journey" series, the others being The Last Campaign, The Trio Years and An American Folk Song Anthology.

The album was reissued on the CD label Laserlight in 1991 as "American Sketches" using different cover art. Two titles from this album were also released in different versions on the 1984 Homecoming Records sampler The Gathering.

== Track listing ==
All compositions by John Stewart

- Side one
1. "The Plains" – 10:32
  - "Distant Wagons" – 2:31
  - "Witchita Cross Winds" – 4:17
  - "Betsy From Pike" – 2:09
  - "Indian Springs" – 1:35
2. "The Wilderness" – 10:02
  - "Grand Canyon Summer" – 2:09
  - "The Hooliann" – 1:50
  - "Montana Crossing" – 2:19
  - "After The Rain" – 2:28
  - "The Launch of Apollo 11" – 1:16
- Side two
1. "Behind The Wheel" – 8:20
2. "The Gold Rush" – 5:44

== Personnel ==
- John Stewart - all instruments

=== Additional personnel ===
- John Stewart - producer
- Fred Koch - engineer
- Stephen Marcussen - mastering
- Dean Comvell - cover: original artist
- Marci Wilson - painter
- Henry Diltz - photo
