= Janes Rejoice =

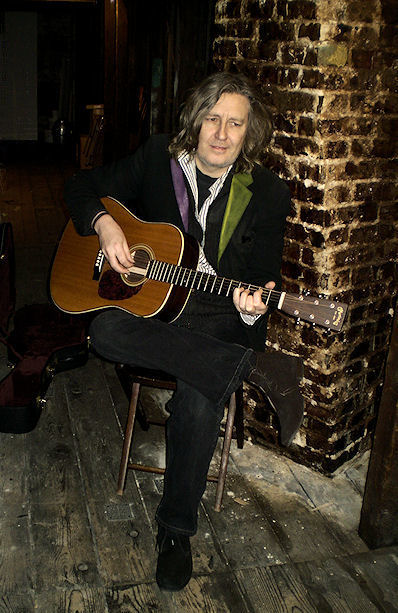
Søren Nørregaard – Founder of Janes Rejoice. Attic session.

Janes Rejoice is a Danish-based group, formed in 1987–88 around the pop rock folk songs of singer-songwriter Søren Nørregaard.

== Albums ==
- Views to Keep – 1988
- Flaming Flamingo – 1989
- Spins – 1992
- Afterglow – 1999
- Totem – 2006
- Eleven Rhymes – 2012
- Sky Six Shack Seven – 2019
- Jupitor Irontower - 2025
