= ZigZag (magazine) =

UK rock music magazine

- February 1978 cover, featuring Debbie Harry of Blondie
- Categories: Music
- Frequency: Monthly
- First issue: 16 April 1969
- Final issue: January 1986
- Country: United Kingdom
- Language: English

ZigZag was a British rock music magazine. It was started by Pete Frame and the first edition was published on 16 April 1969. The magazine was noted for its interviews, articles, innovative "rock family trees" by Frame, and support for American songwriters such as Michael Nesmith, Mickey Newbury, Gene Clark, etc. It lasted in various forms through to 1986.

== History ==
It was edited by Pete Frame for the first 29 issues, up to February 1973. Frame later said: "None of the English music papers wrote about the music I liked. They all concentrated on popular acts, but I was interested in the Underground scene. So I decided to start a magazine for people who liked the same kind of music I did. I called it Zigzag after the Captain Beefheart track "Zigzag Wanderer" and also the cigarette papers, which were used for rolling joints."

Pete Frame's "rock family trees" first appeared in ZigZag. Very basic examples appeared in issue #14 The Byrds (August 1970) and issue #17 John Mayall (Dec 1970 – Jan 1971). The first "rock family tree" to be presented in the format that Frame would become well known for was in issue #21 Al Kooper (July 1971).

John Tobler joined immediately after the start-up and wrote for ZigZag from issue #2 onwards under the name John HT (his full name being John Hugen-Tobler). He wrote under the name John Tobler from issue #16 (October 1970) onwards.

After dying a first time, the magazine was taken over by Tony Stratton Smith, founder of Charisma Records, and became a regular monthly from January 1974 with even some colour inside. Smith also financed The Amazing ZigZag Concert on 28 April 1974, to celebrate the magazine's fifth birthday. Issues #30 (March 1973) to #40 (April 1974) were edited by Connor McKnight, with Andy Childs becoming editor from issue #42 (June 1974) for about 18 months. Andy Childs originally had his own fanzine, Fat Angel.

== Punk rock years ==
Mid 70s ZigZag was marked by more musical British influence such as pub rock and early punk rock band (Dr. Feelgood, The Stranglers). Pete Frame became editor again from issue #58 (March 1976) to issue #74 (July 1977) – with the exception of three of those issues where Paul Kendall was editor.

Appointed as editor in August 1977, a major revolution was led by Kris Needs which saw ZigZag going through a third period where the magazine was totally devoted to punk. Around this time Pete Frame distanced himself and published the first book of his famous series of 'rock trees' tracing changing personnel line-ups in the rock music world. Late 70s, ZigZag poll introduced Ian Dury, Buzzcocks, Sex Pistols, The Clash, Blondie, and minor artists such as Patrick Fitzgerald and Gruppo Sportivo.

ZigZag continued to be published in London and edited by Needs until the end of 1981 when Mick Mercer took over editorial duties. In April 1982, the ZigZag Club live music venue was opened at 22-24 Great Western Road, London W9. By the end of the year it had closed. The magazine ceased publication for a period during 1983 and was then re-launched for a fourth period, in October 1983, with Mick Mercer as editor, covering post-punk and early goth. It ceased publication with its final issue in January 1986, having published approximately 140 issues.

There was a failed attempt to relaunch the magazine in June 1990, with just one issue being published. ZigZag was purchased in July 1988 from Northern & Shell, who had amalgamated it with music equipment title "one two testing". Jim Maguire, who had been business manager of ZigZag in the 1970s, persuaded Richard Desmond (Northern & Shell) to sell him the title. Jim Maguire had a sound publishing deal with EMAP. But EMAP closed ZigZag after just one issue (May 1990) and then produced Mojo, a new rock monthly, some months later.
