= Cannons in the Rain =

Studio album by John Stewart
- Released: March 1973
- Genre: Folk
- Length: 36:05
- Label: RCA
- Producer: Nik Venet

John Stewart chronology
Sunstorm (1972)	Cannons in the Rain (1973)	The Phoenix Concerts (1974)

Professional ratings
Review scores
Source	Rating
Allmusic	4/5 stars

Cannons in the Rain is the sixth album by folk musician John Stewart, former member of The Kingston Trio. It is his first album on RCA Records.

== Track listing ==
All compositions by John Stewart except where noted.

=== Side one ===
1. "Durango" – 2:51
2. "Chilly Winds" (John Stewart, John Philips)– 3:35
3. "Easy Money" – 3:23
4. "Anna On a Memory" – 3:02
5. "All Time Woman" – 3:15
6. "Road Away" – 3:10

=== Side two ===
1. "Armstrong" – 2:35
2. "Spirit" – 3:54
3. "Wind Dies Down" – 3:31
4. "Cannons in the Rain" – 3:20
5. "Lady and the Outlaw" – 3:29

== Personnel ==
- Guitar: Fred Carter Jr., Kelso Herston, John Stewart, Waddy Wachtel, John Buck Wilkin, Chip Young. Pedal Steel: Pete Drake
- Mandolin: Chris Darrow
- Banjo: Bobby Thompson
- Bass: Arnie Moore
- Piano: Hargus "Pig" Robbins
- Drums: Buddy Harman, Russ Kunkel
- Percussion: Charlie McCoy, Farrell Morris
- Harmonica: Charlie McCoy
- Backing Vocals: Buffy Ford, Linda Hargrove, The Nashville Edition, Bergen White
