= Wingless Angels =

Studio album by John Stewart
- Released: April 1975
- Studio: Burbank Studios, Burbank, California
- Genre: Folk
- Length: 40:48
- Label: RCA
- Producer: Nikolas Venet

John Stewart chronology
The Phoenix Concerts (1974)	Wingless Angels (1975)	Fire in the Wind (1977)

Professional ratings
Review scores
Source	Rating
Allmusic	3/5 stars

Wingless Angels is an album released in 1975 and it is the eighth album by folk musician John Stewart, former member of the Kingston Trio.

== Track listing ==
All compositions by John Stewart except where noted.

Side one

1. "Hung on the Heart (Of a Man Back Home)" – 3:53
2. "Rose Water" – 3:11
3. "Wingless Angels/Survivors II" (John Stewart, Michael Cannon/John Stewart) – 5:25
4. "Some Kind of Love" – 3:56
5. "Survivors" – 4:02

Side two

1. "Summer Child" (John Stewart, Michael Cannon) – 4:51
2. "Josie" – 2:57
3. "Ride Stone Blind" – 4:33
4. "Mazatlan/Adelita" (John Stewart/Public Domain) – 4:11
5. "Let the Big Horse Run" – 3:49

== Personnel ==
- John Stewart – electric guitar, acoustic guitar
- Joe Osborn - bass
- Ron Tutt - drums
- Peter Jameson - guitar
- Waddy Wachtel - electric guitar, slide guitar
- Tom Keene - piano, Fender Rhodes
- Dan Dugmore - pedal steel
- Arnie Moore - bass on "Let The Big Horse Run"
- Jonathan Douglas - piano on "Some Kind Of Love"
- Russ Kunkel - drums on "Some Kind Of Love"
- Mike Settle - background vocals
- Denny Brooks - background vocals
- Stephanie Ford - background vocals
- Daniel Moore - background vocals
- Marti McCall - background vocals
- Jackie Ward - background vocals
- Lisa Freeman Roberts - background vocals

=== Additional personnel ===
- Nikolas Venet - producer
- Perry Botkin, Jr. - string arrangements, conductor
- Pete Abbott - recording engineer
- Andy McDonald - second
- Sergio Reyes - second
- Henry Diltz - photos
- Frank Murvey - art direction
- Gary Burdon - art direction
- Gribbitt - graphics
- Dave Guard - arrangements on "Ride Stone Blind"
- Mike Settle - vocal arrangements on "Let The Big Horse Run"
- Jon Douglas - arrangements on "Some Kind Of Love"
- John Denver - Backing vocals on "Survivors"
