= Kris Needs =

British journalist and author (born 1954)

Kris Needs (born 3 July 1954) is a British journalist and author, known for writings on music from the 1970s onwards. He became editor of proto-punk and early punk rock ZigZag magazine in August 1977 at 23 and has since written biographies of musicians and rock stars, including Primal Scream, Joe Strummer and Keith Richards.

== Early life ==
In 1972, Needs became the secretary of the Mott The Hoople fan club, the Sea Divers, which he ran from his home in Aylesbury, Buckinghamshire. His contact details at the time appear on the sleeve of the band's sixth studio album, Mott.

In the late 1970s, he fronted a band The Vice Creems, appearing in John Otway's Aylesbury Market Square free concert and also recorded a single with The Clash's Mick Jones and Topper Headon in the same studio that The Rolling Stones used to record their late 1960s peaks. Billy Idol contributed percussion and backing vocals for the band.

== Career ==
Needs started in journalism on the Thame Gazette, a weekly newspaper in Oxfordshire, went on to The Bucks Advertiser and then took over editing ZigZag, the UK's first monthly music mag, in 1977.

Needs and Wonder Schneider formed the band Secret Knowledge and recorded the 1992 club hit "Sugar Daddy" on Andrew Weatherall's Sabres of Paradise label. The track appeared on their 1996 electronic album So Hard. Kris and Wonder also recorded with Leftfield as Delta Lady.

Needs started DJing at college in 1970, continuing at 70s punk rock events, the Batcave in London during the 1980s and for Primal Scream and Prodigy in the 90s while spinning at the world's clubs, including Ibiza's infamous Manumission.

In 2014, he completed the biographical work on George Clinton: George Clinton: The Cosmic Odyssey of Dr Funkenstein. In 2015 he wrote the authorised biography of Suicide; Dream Baby Dream: Suicide; A New York Story.

In 2022, he was writing for various UK music magazines, including MOJO, Record Collector, Classic Rock, Prog, Electronic Sound, Vive Le Rock and Shindig!. In May 2017, he launched No More Big Wheels with author Helen Donlon, an online outlet for cultural essays beyond the remits of the magazines.
