= Jeff Dexter =

British DJ, promoter & record producer (born 1946)

- Born: Jeffery Dexter Bedwell; 15 August 1946 (age 79); Lambeth, South London, England
- Genres: Mod
- Occupations: DJ; club promoter; record producer; dancer
- Years active: 1960s–present

Jeff Dexter (born Jeffery Dexter Bedwell, 15 August 1946) is a British disc jockey (DJ), club promoter, record producer, and former dancer, who rose to prominence in the mid-1960s as the resident DJ at the influential London club Middle Earth. He is closely associated with the mod scene and popularising the twist dance in England.

== Early life ==
Dexter was born 15 August 1946 in Lambeth, South London, and his upbringing was in Newington Butts, close to Elephant and Castle, moving to Camberwell Road when he was ten years old.

Dexter has said that the first record he ever bought was a 78 of "Sixteen Tons" by Tennessee Ernie Ford in 1955 or '56, which he had to visit friends to play as his family didn't have a gramophone.

He has been interested in clothing and style from a young age, influenced by his mother and brother, and as a boy, joined the Sea Scouts and the Boys' Brigade so that he could wear the uniform. He did dressmaking and tailoring which made him popular with girls, which he enjoyed. Often, he was the only boy at some of the places where he mixed.

== The Lyceum ==
When he was fourteen years old, some of the girls that Dexter knew asked him to go to the Lyceum Theatre (in London), but Dexter later recalled, "I was 4′ 8-1/2″ at the time, and probably looked about 11. How could I [have] got to the Lyceum? I had all the clothes; I had every piece of equipment to look like I was a grown up, but I had this tiny little face and tiny little frame." Finally, he managed to become a member in August 1961, aged 14, by saying that he was 16. It was there that he first met the DJ Ian Samwell, and they soon became firm friends.

In 1959, Dexter became friends with a 12-year-old Mark Feld, who later became known as Marc Bolan, and they used to visit the Lyceum together. Both had trouble gaining admission due to being small for their age, which they made up for with plenty of "front" and nice clothes. Neither could afford to buy expensive suits, so they would visit the children's department of high street shops like Woolworths and C&A and adapt the clothes themselves with help from friends.

== The twist ==
In September 1961, Dexter was banned from the Lyceum for dancing the twist, which had just arrived in England. According to Dexter, the management thought the dance obscene. Two weeks later, he managed to get back in by promising not to do the dance, but two weeks later, ironically, the twist was then demonstrated by the Arthur Murray School of Dancing at the Lyceum. Dexter's dancing was filmed and included in the Pathé newsreels shown in cinemas. As a result, he was hired by the Lyceum as a dancer, aged fifteen, even though under sixteens were officially blocked from admission to the club. He dropped his tailoring and music studies to take the job and later said, "The thought of being paid to dance with women was just phenomenal!"

Dexter has commented on the number of French-run clubs in London in the early 1960s, such as La Discothèque and La Poubelle, which may have been London's first discothèque. He recalls that the French became obsessed with the twist, and the dance even became known as the "French Twist". In early 1962, Dexter made a record, written by Ian Samwell, with the songs "Let Me Teach You How to Dance" and "Twistin' Like the French Kids Do!"

== DJing ==
Dexter was the resident DJ at the Middle Earth club in Covent Garden, along with John Peel. This was a bigger club than the UFO in Tottenham Court Road where Dexter was also the resident DJ. Dexter also DJ'ed at the 1971 Glastonbury Fair, a precursor to the current Glastonbury Festival.

== Career in the music industry ==
In 1970, he became the manager of America, the American folk rock band formed in London earlier that year, consisting of Gerry Beckley, Dewey Bunnell, and Dan Peek. He also co-produced their first album, America (1972) and got them their first gig. They went on to have number one hits in 1972 including "A Horse with No Name".
