= Bombs Away Dream Babies =

Studio album by John Stewart
- Released: May 1979
- Studio: Filmways and Wally Heider Recording, Hollywood; Larrabee Sound Studios; Village Recorder, Los Angeles
- Genre: Rock, pop
- Length: 35:36
- Label: RSO
- Producer: John Stewart, Lindsey Buckingham

John Stewart chronology
Fire in the Wind (1977)	Bombs Away Dream Babies (1979)	John Stewart in Concert (1980)

Professional ratings
Review scores
Source	Rating
Allmusic	4.5/5 stars

Bombs Away Dream Babies is an album by John Stewart that was released by RSO Records in 1979. The album peaked at No. 10 on the Billboard album chart and yielded three Top 40 singles: "Gold" (No. 5), "Midnight Wind" (No. 28), and "Lost Her in the Sun" (No. 34). This was the bestselling album of Stewart's career.

Lindsey Buckingham and Stevie Nicks, both of Fleetwood Mac, appeared on the album. Nicks sang background vocals. Buckingham sang, played guitar, and co-produced.

== Track listing ==
All compositions by John Stewart.

1. "Gold" – 4:26
2. "Lost Her in the Sun" – 3:51
3. "Runaway Fool of Love" – 2:32
4. "Somewhere Down the Line" – 2:52
5. "Midnight Wind" – 4:30
6. "Over the Hill" – 3:13
7. "The Spinnin' of the World" – 1:42
8. "Comin' Out of Nowhere" – 2:03
9. "Heart of the Dream" – 3:21
10. "Hand Your Heart to the Wind" – 3:55

== Personnel ==
- John Stewart – vocals, guitar, kalimba
- Lindsey Buckingham – guitar, vocals
- Stevie Nicks – vocals
- Joey Harris – guitar, vocals
- Joey Carbone – keyboards
- Wayne Hunt – keyboards, vocals
- Bryan Garofalo – bass guitar, vocals
- David Jackson – bass guitar
- Chris Whelan – bass guitar, vocals
- Buffy Ford Stewart – vocals
- Mary Kay Place – vocals
- Croxey Adams – vocals
- Dave Guard – vocals
- Catherine Guard – vocals
- Christine DeLisle – vocals
- Deborah Tompkins – vocals
- Mary Torrey – vocals
- Russ Kunkel – drums
- Mike Botts – drums
- Rick Shlosser – drums
- Gary Weisberg – drums

== Charts ==
Chart (1979)	Peak position
Australia (Kent Music Report)	10
