= Pete Frame =

English music journalist and historian

Peter Frame (born 10 November 1942 in Luton, Bedfordshire, England) is an English music journalist and historian of rock music.

He has produced outlines of the history of rock bands for various magazines, such as Sounds, NME, Melody Maker and Rolling Stone. In 1969, Frame founded the English alternative rock magazine ZigZag. He was its editor, from its beginning until February 1973, and again from March 1976 until July 1977. He was also an A&R man for B&C Charisma Records, and the manager of the band, Starry Eyed and Laughing.

Five volumes of his Rock Family Trees have been published; the first two were joined as The Complete Rock Family Trees. He is also author of Rockin' Around Britain.

In October 2007, his 500-page book, The Restless Generation - How rock music changed the face of 1950s Britain, was published by Rogan House.

== Television series ==
The Rock Family Trees books were used as the basis for the BBC Television series Rock Family Trees in the 1990s, narrated by John Peel.

=== Series one ===
- The Fleetwood Mac Story - broadcast 24 June 1995. Featuring the formation and spin offs of Fleetwood Mac.
- The Birmingham Beat - broadcast 1 July 1995. Featuring The Moody Blues, The Move and Electric Light Orchestra
- Deep Purple People - broadcast 8 July 1995. Featuring the formation and spin offs of Deep Purple.
- New York Punk - broadcast 22 July 1995. Featuring The New York Dolls, Blondie, The Ramones, Talking Heads, Television, Jayne County and Patti Smith.
- The British R&B Boom - broadcast 29 July 1995. featuring British R&B acts Manfred Mann, Cream, Graham Bond Organisation, The Yardbirds and John Mayall's Bluesbreakers.
- The New Merseybeat - broadcast 5 August 1995. Featuring Echo & The Bunnymen, Teardrop Explodes, Big in Japan, Frankie Goes to Hollywood, OMD and Ian Broudie.

=== Series two ===
- California Dreamin' - broadcast 4 September 1998. Featuring American folk rock of the 1960s including The Lovin' Spoonful, The Mamas and Papas and Barry McGuire.
- Sabbath, Bloody Sabbath - broadcast 11 September 1998. Featuring the formation and spin offs of Black Sabbath.
- The Mersey Sound - broadcast 18 September 1998. Featuring Merseybeat acts The Beatles, Billy J. Kramer and the Dakotas, Gerry and the Pacemakers and The Searchers.
- Banshees and Other Creatures - broadcast 25 September 1998. Featuring bands to evolve from the English Punk scene including Siouxsie and the Banshees, the Sex Pistols, Public Image Ltd, Adam and the Ants and The Cure.
- The Prog Rock Years - broadcast 2 October 1998. Featuring Yes, Emerson, Lake and Palmer and Asia.
- And God Created Manchester - broadcast 9 October 1998. Featuring The Buzzcocks, Joy Division, New Order and Happy Mondays.

== Bibliography ==
- The Complete Rock Family Trees. Omnibus Press 1993. ISBN 978-0-7119-0465-1
- The Beatles and Some Other Guys. Omnibus Press 1997. ISBN 978-0-7119-3665-2
- More Rock Family Trees. Omnibus Press 1998. ISBN 978-0-7119-6879-0
- Rockin' Around Britain. Omnibus Press 1999. ISBN 978-0-7119-6973-5
- The Restless Generation. Rogan House 2007. ISBN 978-0-9529540-7-1
- Even More Rock Family Trees. Omnibus Press 2011. ISBN 978-1-8444900-7-3
