= The Phoenix Concerts =

Live album by John Stewart
- Released: June 1974
- Recorded: March 1974
- Genre: Folk
- Length: 63:37
- Label: RCA
- Producer: Nikolas Venet

John Stewart chronology
Cannons in the Rain (1973)	The Phoenix Concerts (1974)	Wingless Angels (1975)

Professional ratings
Review scores
Source	Rating
Allmusic	4.5/5 stars

The Phoenix Concerts is a live album released in 1974, and it is the seventh solo album by folk musician John Stewart, former member of The Kingston Trio. It was recorded live at Phoenix Symphony Hall in Phoenix, Arizona, March 1974, and it was Stewart's first live album release. It was originally released as a double album.

== Track listing ==
All compositions by John Stewart.

=== Original LP release ===
- Side one
1. "Wheatfield Lady" – 2:25
2. "Kansas Rain" – 2:33
3. "You Can't Look Back" – 1:35
4. "The Pirates of Stone County Road" – 5:30
5. "The Runaway Fool of Love" – 2:18
- Side two
1. "Roll Away the Stone" – 2:44
2. "July, You're a Woman" – 3:30
3. "The Last Campaign Trilogy" [Containing "All The Brave Horses"] – 8:15
- Side three
1. "Oldest Living Son" – 2:50
2. "Little Road and a Stone to Roll" – 2:15
3. "Kansas" – 3:35
4. "Cody" – 3:11
5. "California Bloodlines" – 4:45
- Side four
1. "Mother Country" – 5:38
2. "Cops" – 3.20
3. "Never Goin' Back (to Nashville Anymore)" – 9:13

=== Addition tracks on CD release ===
1. Freeway Pleasure -
2. Let the Big Horse Run -

== Personnel ==
- John Stewart – electric guitar, acoustic guitar
- Arnie Moore - bass
- Jonathan Douglas - organ, congas, piano
- Loren Newkirk - piano, organ
- Jim Gordon - drums
- Michael Stewart - rhythm guitar
- Dan Dugmore - pedal steel guitar, electric guitar
- Mike Settle - vocals
- Denny Brooks - vocals
- Buffy Ford - vocals

=== Additional personnel ===
- Nikolas Venet - producer
- Pete Abbott - record and remix engineer
- Eddie Brennen - remix technician
- Ken Caillat - recording crew
- Jack Crymes - recording crew
- Biff Dawes - recording crew
- Ron Monzo - road equipment manager
- Dick Goldstein - road equipment manager
- Frank Mulvey - art direction
- Elbinger & Sun - cover photo
- Fred Valentine - inside photos
