= John Stewart (musician) =

American singer-songwriter (1939–2008)

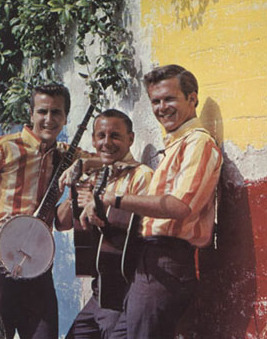
- John Stewart (left) as part of the Kingston Trio in 1963

Background information
- Born: John Coburn Stewart; September 5, 1939; San Diego, California, U.S.
- Died: January 19, 2008 (aged 68) San Diego, California, U.S.
- Genres: Folk, pop
- Instruments: Guitar, banjo
- Labels: Capitol, Decca, Warner Bros., RCA, RSO, Polydor
- Formerly of: The Cumberland Three; The Kingston Trio

John Coburn Stewart (September 5, 1939 – January 19, 2008) was an American songwriter and singer. He is known for his contributions to the American folk music movement of the 1960s while with the Kingston Trio (1961–1967) and as a popular music songwriter of songs performed by the Monkees, as well as his own No. 5 hit "Gold" during a solo career spanning 40 years that included almost four dozen albums and more than 600 recorded songs.

== Early life ==
Born in San Diego, Stewart was the son of horse trainer John S. Stewart and spent his childhood and adolescence in Southern California, living mostly in the cities of Pasadena and Claremont. He graduated in 1957 from Pomona Catholic High School, which at the time was a coeducational school. Following graduation from high school, Stewart went on to attend Mt. San Antonio Junior College in Walnut, California, during 1957–1958, when he was active in its music and theater programs.

Stewart demonstrated an early talent for music, learning the guitar and banjo. He composed his first song, "Shrunken Head Boogie," when he was ten years old. In an interview in Michael Oberman's 'Music Makers' column (The Washington Star) on 30 October 1971, Stewart said, "I bought a ukulele when I was in Pasadena. I would listen to Sons of the Pioneers records. Tex Ritter really turned me on to music. 'I Love My Rooster' was Top Ten as far as I was concerned." John Stewart was a friend of Frank Zappa in the late 1950s. They both attended Pomona High School in California, where Zappa taught Stewart the chords to "The Streets of Laredo".

== Musical career ==
Stewart's first venture into popular music was with a high school garage band known as Johnny Stewart and the Furies. Influenced by the reigning icons of the day, Elvis Presley and Buddy Holly, the Furies toured southern California colleges and coffee houses, releasing one single in 1957, "Rockin' Anna," which was a minor regional hit.

Following the breakup of the Furies and a short time as a member of the Woodsmen, Stewart teamed with Gil Robbins (father of actor Tim Robbins) and John Montgomery to form the Cumberland Three, a group patterned after and heavily influenced by the increasingly popular Kingston Trio. The major accomplishment of the Cumberland Three was a two-LP set of Songs from the Civil War, with the albums containing a compilation of songs from the Confederacy and the Union, respectively. In all, the Cumberland Three released three albums after which Stewart left the group to join the Kingston Trio, replacing Trio founder Dave Guard in 1961.

=== Kingston Trio years ===
The Kingston Trio had emerged from the relatively crowded San Francisco folk music culture in 1957, using a mixture of calypso, pop, and folk styles along with several forms of comedy in their act. Relying on new pop-oriented arrangements of folk music classics as well as some original compositions, the Trio earned their first gold record with "Tom Dooley" and thereby launched a major revival in folk music that led to and influenced the careers of Bob Dylan, Peter, Paul, & Mary, and John Denver, among others. The group had become one of the best-known and best-selling acts on the folk music scene and were enjoying a lucrative recording and touring contract with Capitol Records, having ten albums under their collective belts when Dave Guard departed the group in 1961 to explore other musical directions. Stewart was selected by the remaining members Nick Reynolds and Bob Shane as Guard's successor, bringing with him his respected skills as a musician, composer, and performer.

Reynolds, Shane, and Stewart recorded a dozen albums together, taking the music of the Trio into new directions, including more original material, and performing songs by relative newcomers Tom Paxton, Mason Williams and Gordon Lightfoot.

The pop-folk era began to wane as the music of groups such as the Beatles, the Rolling Stones, and fellow Californians the Beach Boys increasingly dominated the charts, and in 1967 the members of the Kingston Trio decided to disband.

=== Solo career, the post-Trio years ===
Stewart continued to write songs and record for Capitol while touring as a solo act. It was during this time that he composed the hit "Daydream Believer" which was picked up and recorded by the Monkees, and which was also later a hit for Anne Murray as well, and the closest Stewart came to writing a "standard". He also wrote "Never Goin' Back" for the Lovin' Spoonful, which he recorded on his own 1969 album California Bloodlines. He later toured with Robert F. Kennedy's ill-fated 1968 presidential campaign and met and married in 1975 fellow folk singer Buffy Ford (with whom he remained until his death). He recorded a string of albums, including his signature LP, California Bloodlines, as well as Willard, Cannons in the Rain, and Wingless Angels.

Though usually successful with critics and a core group of fans, Stewart's albums were not considered commercial successes; he left Capitol after only two solo releases and was signed by Warner Bros. Records, where he also recorded just two albums before moving on to RCA Records, with whom he released three LPs, including a live performance album, The Phoenix Concerts). Stewart followed his separation from RCA with a contract at the Robert Stigwood Organisation (RSO), the same label that released recordings by Eric Clapton, the Bee Gees, and several other disco performers. It was at RSO Records that Stewart enjoyed his most commercially successful years as a solo artist. Teaming with Stevie Nicks and Lindsey Buckingham, both then in Fleetwood Mac, Stewart recorded and released Bombs Away Dream Babies, which reached #10 on Billboard's principal album chart and included the #5 hit "Gold" in 1979. Stewart later stopped performing "Gold" in concert, calling it "vapid" and "empty".

Two other tracks from Bombs Away, "Midnight Wind" and "Lost Her in the Sun", also hit the Top 40, making Stewart a sudden pop star at the age of 40. However, the follow-up album Dream Babies Go Hollywood (1980) proved to be a commercial disappointment, reaching only #85 on the album chart. None of the singles from that LP or any of his subsequent albums made the Billboard Hot 100, though Stewart continued to perform right up to the time of his death.

=== Later years ===
Stewart's most significant success was as a songwriter. Several of his songs were recorded by a number of popular acts, including Nanci Griffith ("Sweet Dreams Will Come"), Rosanne Cash ("Runaway Train", "Dance with the Tiger"), and Joan Baez ("Strange Rivers"). He also continued to record new material, producing CDs on his own "Neon Dreams" label in between commercial releases. They usually coincided with one of his tours. His last album was The Day the River Sang in 2006.

In his later years, Stewart teamed with former Kingston Trio member Nick Reynolds to offer fans the chance to perform with Stewart and Reynolds. In 2005 and 2006 Bob Shane attended and performed a few songs with Stewart and Reynolds at the "Trio Fantasy Camp", which was held annually in Scottsdale, Arizona.

A tape recording of Stewart's 1969 song "Mother Country" from California Bloodlines was heard playing in the Apollo 11 spacecraft while in orbit around the Moon. The production team of CNN's 2019 film Apollo 11 heard the song while listening to archival footage of the flight and included a blend of the astronaut's tape with the original studio recording of the tune in the soundtrack as the craft approached the Earth's atmosphere.

In 2001, Stewart was awarded the Lifetime Achievement Award by the World Folk Music Association.

== Personal life ==
Stewart had a passion for painting, doing art shows and covers for his recordings and books. He continued to be a prolific songwriter and toured the United States and Europe regularly. He married Julie Koehler in 1960, having three children with her and resided in Marin County, California. He met his second wife, Buffy Ford Stewart, through music and married her in 1975. Stewart's brother Mike, who died in 2002, founded the folk-rock group We Five in the mid-1960s. He was the uncle of Jamie Stewart of the band Xiu Xiu.

== Death ==
In 2007, Stewart was diagnosed with the early stages of Alzheimer's disease, but resolved to continue performing for as long as he was able. On January 19, 2008, at the age of 68, he died from a stroke at a San Diego hospital, ten days before a scheduled performance in Scottsdale, Arizona.

In addition to his wife, Buffy, he was survived by their son Luke, along with three children from his first marriage: Amy, Jeremy, and Mikael (a sound technician).

== Discography ==
=== The Cumberland Three ===
- Folk Scene U.S.A., 1960
- Civil War Almanac - "Yankees" Vol. 1, 1960
- Civil War Almanac - "Rebels" Vol. 2, 1960

=== Solo ===
- Signals Through the Glass, John Stewart and Buffy Ford, 1968
- California Bloodlines, 1969 #193
- Willard, 1970
- The Lonesome Picker Rides Again, 1971
- Sunstorm, 1972
- Cannons in the Rain, 1973 #202
- The Phoenix Concerts, 1974
- Wingless Angels, 1975
- Fire in the Wind, 1977
- Bombs Away Dream Babies, 1979
- Gold, 1979 (compilation)
- John Stewart in Concert, version of Phoenix Concerts, 1980
- Forgotten Songs of Some Old Yesterday, 1980
- Dream Babies Go Hollywood, 1980
- Blondes, 1982
- Revenge of the Budgie, John Stewart and Nick Reynolds, 1983
- Trancas, 1984
- Centennial, 1984
- The Last Campaign, 1985
- Punch the Big Guy, 1987
- The Complete Phoenix Concerts, 1990
- American Sketches (re-release of Centennial), 1990
- Deep in the Neon, 1991
- Neon Beach, 1991
- Bullets in the Hour Glass, 1992
- American Originals, 1992
- Chilly Winds, 1993
- Airdream Believer, 1995
- Bandera, 1995
- Turning Music into Gold - The Best of John Stewart, 1995
- American Journey [box: The Last Campaign, The Trio Years, An American Folk Song Anthology], 1996
- The Trio Years, 1996
- An American Folk Song Anthology, 1996
- Live at The Turf Inn, Scotland, John Stewart and Buffy Ford, 1996
- Rough Sketches, 1997
- Teresa and the Lost Songs, 1998
- One Night in Denver, 1998
- Gold, 1999
- John Stewart & Darwins Army, 1999
- Rocket Roy in the Real World, 1999
- Way Too Much Fun, 2000
- Buster, 2000
- Wires from the Bunker, 2000
- Savannah, 2000
- Johnny Moonlight, 2000
- Front Row Music: Before the War, 2001
- Armstrong, 2001
- The Americans, 2002
- A Night at Jimmy Duke's - Johnny and the Nasty Britches, 2002
- The Runner, 2002
- Secret Tapes, 2002
- Ballads, 2003
- Havana, 2003
- Tanforan, 2003
- Earth Rider, 2003
- Songs to Drive By, 2003
- The Complete Blondes, 2003
- The Day the River Sang, 2006
- An Introduction to John Stewart (California Bloodlines + Willard), 2006
- Bite My Foot, 2009
- The Amazing ZigZag Concert, 2010 (Disc 3 of 5-CD box set, recorded in April, 1974)
- Summer's Child, 2012 (Radio show broadcast live from Ebbet's Field, Denver, Colorado, 1975)
- One Night in Prescott, 2016
- Old Forgotten Altars: The 1960s Demos, 2020
