= Escala (album) =

Studio album by Escala
- Released: 25 May 2009
- Recorded: 2008–09; Sarm West London, Sarm West Coast Los Angeles, Angel Recording Studios
- Genre: Classical/Pop Crossover Rock Orchestra
- Length: 39:35
- Label: Syco
- Producer: Trevor Horn

Escala chronology
Escala (2009)	Quadrasonic (2016)

Professional ratings
Review scores
Source	Rating
Digital Spy	3/5 stars

Escala is the self-titled debut album by British quartet Escala, who appeared on the ITV talent contest Britain's Got Talent. It was released on 25 May 2009 in the United Kingdom.

== Release ==
Escala revealed their debut album to an audience of about 400 media at Whitehall Palace, London on 23 September 2008. The album release was pushed back numerous times, to 1 June 2009. Then the album's release was brought forward by one week to 25 May 2009.

== Recording ==
The album was produced by Trevor Horn and recorded mainly at Sarm West London. Parts of "Kashmir" recorded at Sarm West Coast, Los Angeles, and the orchestra for the album was recorded at Angel Recording Studios, London.

== Album analysis ==
The album begins with "Requiem for a Tower", which is a re-orchestrated version of "Lux Aeterna" from the 2000 film, Requiem for a Dream. The piece will be familiar to viewers of Britain's Got Talent, as it is frequently used on the show. Another group's version of the piece is used by Sky Sports for their News, for whom Escala had been included as a part of an advertising campaign with the second track on the album, "Palladio", a version of "Palladio I, Allegretto" from Karl Jenkins' Diamond Music. It was performed by the group when they were on Britain's Got Talent. The third track is the Led Zeppelin cover, "Kashmir", and features guitarist Slash of hard rock bands Guns N' Roses and Velvet Revolver. In 2009 Escala returned to Britain's Got Talent to perform their version of "Kashmir" un-competitively on the second live semi-final.

The fourth track is "Finding Beauty", originally composed by Scot Craig Armstrong for his As If to Nothing album. The fifth track is a mellow cover of the popular Robert Miles dance track "Children". The sixth track is Wings cover, "Live and Let Die", it was performed by the group when they were on Britain's Got Talent. The seventh track is a cover of film composer Ennio Morricone's "Chi Mai". The eighth track is "Feeling Good", which was originally written by Anthony Newley and Leslie Bricusse for their 1965 musical The Roar of the Greasepaint—the Smell of the Crowd, but resembling the cover by the band Muse. The ninth track is a rendition of George Frideric Handel's "Sarabande". The tenth track is "Clubbed to Death", which was originally from Rob Dougan's debut album Furious Angels. The album ends with a traditional style version Samuel Barber's "Adagio for Strings".

The album features four songs which fellow British quartet Bond had recorded in a similar style: "Adagio for Strings", "Kashmir", "Palladio", and "Children" (which Bond performed under the title "Homecoming") on their Shine, Remixed and Classified albums.

Many Bond enthusiasts claimed Escala were mimicking the contemporary style of Bond which currently have substantial holding in the classical musical industry. Escala rebuked the claims. The Guardian newspaper in the UK stated, "a would be classical hit however the covers are endless [...] a lack of new original material".

According to media reports a cover of Snow Patrol's "Chasing Cars" was originally meant to appear on the album, but did not end up on the final release.

== Track listing ==
No.	Title	Writer(s)	Length
1.	"Requiem for a Tower"	Clinton Mansell	1:59
2.	"Palladio"	Karl Jenkins	3:55
3.	"Kashmir" (featuring Slash)	Robert Plant / Jimmy Page / John Bonham	3:25
4.	"Finding Beauty"	Craig Armstrong	3:21
5.	"Children"	Roberto Concina	4:28
6.	"Live and Let Die"	Paul McCartney / Linda McCartney	2:55
7.	"Chi Mai"	Ennio Morricone	3:40
8.	"Feeling Good"	Anthony Newley / Leslie Bricusse	4:02
9.	"Sarabande"	Handel	2:38
10.	"Clubbed to Death"	Rob Dougan	4:56
11.	"Adagio for Strings"	Samuel Barber	4:16

== Charts ==
The album reached number 2 on the UK Albums Chart (31 May) and number 49 in the Republic of Ireland (28 May).

=== Weekly charts ===
Chart (2009)	Peak position
UK Albums Chart	2
Irish Albums Chart	10
US Classical Albums	3

=== Year-end charts ===
Chart (2009)	Position
US Classical Albums	49

"Palladio" also made No. 39 in the UK Singles Chart (31 May), and No. 49 in Ireland (28 May).

== Personnel ==
- Trevor Horn – producer, guitar, programming, piano, bass
- Tim Weidner – recording engineer, mixer, programming
- Gary Langan – recording engineer
- Sam Farr – assistant engineer
- Graham Archer – assistant engineer, programming
- Smit – assistant engineer
- Mark Lewis – Pro Tools engineer
- Ash Soan – drums, percussion
- Pete Murray – programming, arranger, conductor, piano, Hammond organ, Wurlitzer
- Isobel Griffiths – orchestral contractor and fixer
- Perry Montague-Mason – orchestra leader
- Magnus Johnstone – assistant of string production
- Thomas Carroll – Cello
- Fiona Winning – Viola
- Robert Orton (Hit Mixer) – mixer
- Chris Elliot – arranger, piano, harpsichord
- Earl Harvin – drums
- Jason Perry – drum ideas
- Jamie Muhoberac – guitar samples
- Jenny O'Grady – choirmaster
- Metro Singers – choir
- Jeremy Wheatley – mixer
- Steve Robson – mixer
- Richard Edgeler – assistant mixer
- Simon Hale – arranger
- Steve MacMillan – recording engineer
- Slash – lead guitar
- John Shanks – guitar
- Jeff Rothschild – drums
- Tom Norris – violin
- Everton Nelson – orchestra leader
- Phil Palmer – guitar
- Steve Lipson – guitar
- Lol Creme – guitar
- Ian Thomas – drums
