= Wild (band) =

UK musical group

Wild was a five-piece classical female group. It was often compared to Bond because of the very similar makeup and style of both groups.

Although most of the band was English, Iva Cojic and Andjelka Ristic were born in Serbia.

== History ==
Wild played a range of different genres on their debut album Time, and their music ranged from Latin beats to Celtic inspired. Wild also played the main theme of the TV Show, 'Robinson Crusoe', exclusively at their concerts. Their album, Time, featured a version of the song "The Eve of the War" from Jeff Wayne's Musical Version of The War of the Worlds, which was produced by Wayne himself.

Wild made their debut in 2005, when they were the ambassadors for the Spring Racing Carnival in Melbourne, Australia. Their music was used on Channel 7.

The band also toured Malaysia in 2005.

The group has since split up. Two of the members are now part of Escala, a similar four-piece classical group who supported McFly in 2005 and appeared on Britain's Got Talent in 2008. Iva Cojic continued her career as a solo artist under the name Iva Ikon (singer/ pianist / songwriter).

=== Ex-Members ===
- Iva Cojic (Piano & Vocalist) (now a solo artist under the name Iva Ikon www.ivaikon.com)
- Katie Fenner (Violin)
- Izzy Johnston (Violin) (now a member of Escala)
- Chantal Leverton (Viola)(now a member of Escala)
- Andjelka Ristic (Keyboard)

== Discography ==
Time

Studio album by Wild
- Released: 17 January 2004
- Recorded: 2003
- Genre: Classical Crossover
- Length: 52:14
- Label: EMI Records
- Producer: Mel Bush

=== Albums ===
- Time

Time is the only album released by Wild. It contains 12 tracks with five of them composed by Tonči Huljić, who has composed tracks for Bond. It was released on 17 January 2004 in the UK.

==== Track listing ====
1. "Hipnotic"
2. "Fiesta"
3. "Time & Silence"
4. "The Eve Of The War
5. "Sun Forest"
6. "Ave Maria"
7. "Running Free"
8. "No More"
9. "The Thunder Anthem"
10. "Princess Ashani"
11. "String Fever"
12. "Reload"
13. "Living In The Land"
- Japanese release includes "Hipnotic" (Promo video)Youth Mc

=== DVD ===
- Wild - The World Premiere Performance (DVD)

This DVD contains a concert performed by Wild in London, England, at the London Hippodrome. The quintet played all the songs from their album Time, including an extra song called "Robinson Crusoe".
