= Escala (group) =

Electronic string quartet from England

- Also known as: Scala
- Origin: London, England
- Genres: Classical, pop, crossover
- Years active: 2006–present
- Labels: Syco, Sony
- Spinoff of: Wild
- Members: Victoria Lyon; Honor Watson; Stephanie Benedetti; Helen Nash
- Past members: Izzy Judd; Nastasya Hodges; Chantal Abel
- Website: escalamusic.com

Escala (formerly known as Scala) is an electronic string quartet from London, England who rose to fame when they performed on and reached the final of the second series of Britain's Got Talent on ITV1 in May 2008 finishing in fourth place overall.

== Background ==
Two of the four members of Escala, Izzy Johnston and Chantal Leverton, were part of Wild, a similar five-piece classical group who were signed to EMI and released an album with the label in 2005. The four members of the group met in 2005 when they were part of the string section on an arena tour with McFly. Three of them, Victoria Lyon, Chantal Leverton and Tasya Hodges, performed with Jeff Wayne on his War of the Worlds Tour in 2006.

== Britain's Got Talent ==
Escala entered Britain's Got Talent in 2008. In the first round of the show, Escala performed a "techno version" of Palladio by the Welsh composer Karl Jenkins, and were put through to the semi-finals by judges Simon Cowell, Amanda Holden and Piers Morgan. At the semi-final, they performed an instrumental version of "Live And Let Die" by Paul McCartney and Wings, receiving a positive reaction from the judges, with Piers Morgan describing it as "the best performance of the week". They won the public vote to win the semi-final and secure a place in the final with nine other acts.

In the final, they once again performed "Palladio", but did not get enough public votes to make the top three acts and the show was won by street dancer George Sampson.

=== Controversy ===
The group was alleged to have been invited to audition for Britain's Got Talent by Simon Cowell after they supposedly played the X Factor wrap party in late 2007. However, ITV refused claims that this was unfair, stating "Escala went through the same application and audition process as everyone else. Britain's Got Talent is open to any performer be it professional or amateur, with any talent."

The members of Escala denied that they played at the X Factor wrap party, but on 18 November 2009 on This Morning with Phillip Schofield and Holly Willoughby they admitted that they played at the wrap party that one of Escala's family members had arranged. They were told it could help their career.

=== Name change ===
The quartet changed their name from Scala to eScala during Britain's Got Talent after it was discovered that there was already a Belgian choir using the name Scala – Scala & Kolacny Brothers. They changed the name to eScala after EMI threatened to sue, despite having used the name Scala for two years. After the show they put a lower case 'e' on the beginning to eScala but have since then reverted to Escala.

== After Britain's Got Talent ==
On 6 June 2008 Escala performed at the first night of the nationwide Britain's Got Talent tour in London and on 8 June it was revealed that they had signed a £1.5million contract deal with Sony BMG.

In July 2008 they were signed to perform as part of a new promotional campaign for Sky Sports coverage of the 2008–09 football season. The high-profile campaign began airing on 19 July with Escala performing "Palladio", was filmed at the Royal Horticultural Halls in London and featured them performing with clips from football matches. The promotion campaign was also used to promote other upcoming sports events on the channel.

Escala performed at the 2008 FA Community Shield on 11 August at Wembley Stadium, and accompanied Hayley Westenra when she sang the national anthem.

On 20 September 2008, Escala performed at the Help for Heroes rugby union challenge match at Twickenham Stadium, London in aid of wounded British servicemen and women. On 11 May 2009, Escala made their American debut on The Oprah Winfrey Show as part of her World's Got Talent show with Simon Cowell.

On 25 May 2009, Escala performed as guests, non-competitively, on the second semi-final of the third series of Britain's Got Talent. They performed Led Zeppelin's "Kashmir."

Escala performed on BBC Radio 2's Friday Night is Music Night on 12 June 2009 and followed it up with a performance at Lord's during a charity match between Middlesex and the Rajasthan Royals on 6 July 2009.

On 1 August 2009, Escala played in concert with Anastacia at Osborne House on the Isle of Wight.

On 1 November 2009, Escala performed "Palladio", "Children" and "Kashmir" at the Women of Rock event in London's Royal Albert Hall in aid of the Caron Keating Foundation.

On 25 November 2009, Escala were guests on the afternoon live Alan Titchmarsh Show, on ITV. They were individually interviewed by the eponymous presenter and then performed the Karl Jenkins' composed track "Palladio", from their current CD.

On 4 December 2009, Escala performed "Palladio" at the NASCAR Sprint Cup Awards Ceremony in Las Vegas, Nevada.

The quartet also features on "Louder than Words", from Pink Floyd's The Endless River (2014)

=== Debut album ===
Escala revealed their debut album, aree a They Escala, to an audience of about 400 media at Whitehall Palace, London on 23 September 2008. Produced by Trevor Horn, it was set for release on 25 May 2009. On 29 October 2008 they performed the soundtrack for the premiere of the James Bond film Quantum of Solace at the Odeon Leicester Square during the London Film Festival.

In late March and April 2009, Escala began a regional promotional tour of the United Kingdom. In March 2009, it was also revealed that Escala were to collaborate with Slash on a cover of Led Zeppelin's "Kashmir" for their album; previously, Bond had covered the song in a similar style for their Shine album. Other songs on the album included covers of Robert Miles's "Children" and Wings' "Live and Let Die". Escala also performed at the 250th anniversary of George Frideric Handel in front of Queen Elizabeth II on 5 June 2009 and were met by the Foundling choir and Thomas Coram Middle school Choir.

== Members ==
=== Victoria Lyon ===
Lyon plays violin. She is the great-great-granddaughter of the Swedish opera singer Jenny Lind, went to Wells Cathedral School and graduated from the Royal College of Music before joining the Royal Philharmonic Orchestra where she was the youngest member. She has toured with Simply Red, and performed with Jeff Wayne on his War of the Worlds Tour in 2006. She has also performed with the City of Birmingham Symphony Orchestra and the Philharmonia.

=== Honor Watson ===
Watson enjoys performing internationally as a violinist of electric string quartet Escala, which she became a member of in January 2012.

An experienced performer, Honor has also recorded, performed and toured with many artists. Most recently, Mark Ronson, Ariana Grande, Miley Cyrus, Michael Bublé, Jess Glynne, Ellie Goulding, Pink Floyd, The Sex Pistols, Seal, Elbow, Bastille, Sam Smith, Tom Odell, Beverley Knight, Paloma Faith, Dermot Kennedy, Sarah Connor, Roger Sanchez, Jessie J, Diversity, Bryn Terfel, Michael Ball, Alfie Boe, James McCartney, Jason Donovan, Alexander Armstrong and Ronan Keating.

=== Helen Nash ===
Helen Nash plays the cello, comes from Cornwall, and studied cello at the Royal Welsh College of Music and Drama. She has appeared at Kensington Palace, The Royal Albert Hall, O2 arena, The Royal Variety Performance 2012 and 2013, and others.

=== Stephanie Benedetti ===
Benedetti plays the viola. She was born in West Kilbride, North Ayrshire, to an Italian father and a Scottish mother. She started learning the viola at the age of eight. She played in the RaVen Quartet from 2007 to 2014. She has a younger sister named Nicola who is a violinist. She also toured with multiplatinum selling string quartet Bond as part of their Latin American tour leg in 2014 to cover Elspeth Hanson in viola, as well as Clean Bandit as violinist, starting in 2016.

== Former members ==
=== Chantal Abel (née Leverton) ===
Abel played the viola. She was born in London and started to learn the violin when she was seven. After violin lessons at school, she studied at the Trinity College of Music in Greenwich for five years, where at the age of 13 years she won the "Henry Wood Prize for most promising string player". When she was 14, she played at Wigmore Hall, London in a masterclass with the Vienna Piano Trio. She was a member of the National Youth Orchestra of Great Britain. When she was 17, Abel switched from the violin to the viola following a recommendation from her music teacher. She then joined her music teacher at the Royal Academy of Music on Marylebone Road in London, where she won a scholarship. Before joining Escala, she was a member of Wild with Izzy Judd in 2005. She performed with Jeff Wayne on his War of the Worlds Tour in 2006 and has also performed solo viola at the launch of the new Baldessarini Boutique in Dubai where she was featured in the Middle East OK! magazine. She has also performed with Aled Jones and the boy band Blue.

=== Izzy Judd (née Johnston) ===
Judd plays violin and comes from a family of professional musicians. Her parents run a music school in Hertfordshire and her three older brothers Rupert, Magnus and Guy were all musicians. She started playing the violin at the age of five and appeared in the musical Annie in a school production, playing the title role. She also played Fiddler in the musical Fiddler on the Roof. As a dancer she attended the Royal Ballet Summer School at White Lodge, Richmond Park. She studied the violin at the junior department of the Royal College of Music in London, and then at Chetham's School of Music in Manchester where she won the Ida Caroll String Prize. She then gained a full scholarship to the Royal College of Music where she studied with Howard Davis. She also spent two summers studying at prestigious music schools in the United States. Judd was a member of Wild with Chantal Abel in 2005. She performed an arrangement of the Four Seasons at the 2005 Proms with her brother Magnus, at the Royal Albert Hall. In 2007 she was a guest soloist with Michael Ball.

In 2005, she played in the strings section backing band McFly and the following year began dating McFly drummer Harry Judd. They eventually married on 21 December 2012.

On 27 December 2011, Escala announced on their homepage, that Judd had parted ways with the quartet, stating that she felt she could not commit to a relatively busy year. They held auditions for a new violinist in January. On 7 July 2012, Honor Watson was announced as her replacement.

Since leaving Escala, Judd has been involved in charity work, mainly through the Eyes Alight Appeal, which she and her family set up to raise funds for the Brain Injury Rehabilitation Trust. Her eldest brother Rupert suffered a serious brain injury in 1997 and his long rehabilitation process inspired them to set up the appeal to raise funds for long-term rehab programmes catering to brain injury patients such as Rupert.

Judd has three children with husband Harry, a girl born 2016, and a boy born in 2017 and another boy born in 2021.

=== Nastasya "Tasya" Hodges ===
Hodges played the cello. Born in London, she is half-Croatian and spent her early life living in Croatia and Belgium. She returned to England when she won a scholarship to study at the Yehudi Menuhin School in Surrey. She then spent four years at the Guildhall School of Music and Drama where she won a prize to perform with the London Symphony Orchestra for three months. She graduated from the Guildhall in 2004. She has also performed with the National Youth Orchestra of Great Britain and performed with Jeff Wayne on his War of the Worlds Tour in 2006 then toured with Take That in 2007. She has also recorded with the Arctic Monkeys and The Streets. She was a member of The Heritage Orchestra, who recorded their first album at Abbey Road Studios, which was released on 14 August 2006. She has also performed at the Montreux, and London Jazz Festivals. In 2014 she left the group to go to New York with her husband.

== Discography ==
=== Albums ===
Year	Album details	Chart peak positions		Certifications	Sales
Year	Album details	UK	IRE	Certifications	Sales
2009	Escala: Released: 25 May 2009; Label: Sony BMG, Syco; Format: CD, digital download	2	10	BPI: Gold	UK: 100,000+
2016	Quadrasonic: Released: 15 January 2016; Label: Arctic Poppy; Format: CD, digital download	—	—		
"—" denotes releases that did not chart

=== Charting songs ===
- The following songs from the group's self-titled album charted but were not released as singles.

Year	Single	Chart positions			Album
Year	Single	UK	IE	EU	Album
2009	"Kashmir"	78	—	—	Escala
2009	"Palladio"	39	49	—	Escala
"—" denotes releases that did not chart

== See also ==
- Bond
