= International Film Music Critics Association Award for Best Original Score for a Drama Film =

International fim music award

The International Film Music Critics Association Award for Best Original Score for a Drama Film is an annual award given by the International Film Music Critics Association, or the IFMCA. The award is given to the composer of a film score for a dramatic film deemed to be the best in a given year. The award was first given in 1998, before going a six-year hiatus. It has been awards every year since 2004.

== Winners and nominations ==
=== 1990s ===
Year	Film	Composer(s)
1998	Saving Private Ryan	John Williams
1998	Dangerous Beauty	George Fenton
1998	Ever After	George Fenton
1998	The Horse Whisperer	Thomas Newman
1998	Pleasantville	Randy Newman

=== 2000s ===
Year	Film	Composer(s)
2004	The Aviator	Howard Shore
2004	Being Julia	Mychael Danna
2004	Finding Neverland	Jan A. P. Kaczmarek
2004	The Passion of the Christ	John Debney
2004	A Very Long Engagement	Angelo Badalamenti
2005	Memoirs of a Geisha	John Williams
2005	Fateless	Ennio Morricone
2005	Munich	John Williams
2005	The New World	James Horner
2005	Pride & Prejudice	Dario Marianelli
2006	The Black Dahlia	Mark Isham
2006	The Departed	Howard Shore
2006	The Good German	Thomas Newman
2006	The Nativity Story	Mychael Danna
2006	The Painted Veil	Alexandre Desplat
2006	The Queen	Alexandre Desplat
2007	Atonement	Dario Marianelli
2007	Angel	Philippe Rombi
2007	Eastern Promises	Howard Shore
2007	Lust, Caution	Alexandre Desplat
2007	The Kite Runner	Alberto Iglesias
2008	The Curious Case of Benjamin Button	Alexandre Desplat
2008	The Boy in the Striped Pajamas	James Horner
2008	Che	Alberto Iglesias
2008	Defiance	James Newton Howard
2008	Milk	Danny Elfman
2009	A Single Man	Abel Korzeniowski
2009	Agora	Dario Marianelli
2009	Baarìa	Ennio Morricone
2009	Creation	Christopher Young
2009	Mao's Last Dancer	Christopher Gordon

=== 2010s ===
Year	Film	Composer(s)
2010	The King's Speech	Alexandre Desplat
2010	Amália	Nuno Malo
2010	Black Swan	Clint Mansell
2010	The Karate Kid	James Horner
2010	True Grit	Carter Burwell
2011	War Horse	John Williams
2011	The Artist	Ludovic Bource
2011	Jane Eyre	Dario Marianelli
2011	Soul Surfer	Marco Beltrami
2011	W.E.	Abel Korzeniowski
2012	Lincoln	John Williams
2012	Anna Karenina	Dario Marianelli
2012	The Impossible	Fernando Velázquez
2012	Life of Pi	Mychael Danna
2012	There Be Dragons	Robert Folk
2013	Romeo & Juliet	Abel Korzeniowski
2013	The Best Offer	Ennio Morricone
2013	The Book Thief	John Williams
2013	Copperhead	Laurent Eyquem
2013	Summer in February	Benjamin Wallfisch
2014	The Homesman	Marco Beltrami
2014	The Imitation Game	Alexandre Desplat
2014	The Liberator	Gustavo Dudamel
2014	The Monuments Men	Alexandre Desplat
2014	The Theory of Everything	Jóhann Jóhannsson
2015	Wolf Totem	James Horner
2015	Carol	Carter Burwell
2015	Creed	Ludwig Göransson
2015	Far from the Madding Crowd	Craig Armstrong
2015	The Hateful Eight	Ennio Morricone
2016	Nocturnal Animals	Abel Korzeniowski
2016	The Handmaiden	Jo Yeong-wook
2016	High Rise	Clint Mansell
2016	The Light Between Oceans	Alexandre Desplat
2016	Moonlight	Nicholas Britell
2017	Phantom Thread	Jonny Greenwood
2017	All the Money in the World	Daniel Pemberton
2017	Darkest Hour	Dario Marianelli
2017	Murder on the Orient Express	Patrick Doyle
2017	The Post	John Williams
2018	Mary Queen of Scots	Max Richter
2018	First Man	Justin Hurwitz
2018	If Beale Street Could Talk	Nicholas Britell
2018	Up Among the Stars	Iván Palomares
2018	Vice	Nicholas Britell
2019	Little Women	Alexandre Desplat
2019	A Hidden Life	James Newton Howard
2019	Joker	Hildur Guðnadóttir
2019	Motherless Brooklyn	Daniel Pemberton
2019	The Professor and the Madman	Bear McCreary

=== 2020s ===
Year	Film	Composer(s)
2020	Fukushima 50	Tarō Iwashiro
2020	Da 5 Bloods	Terrence Blanchard
2020	Fanny Lye Deliver'd	Thomas Clay
2020	News of the World	James Newton Howard
2020	The Trial of the Chicago 7	Daniel Pemberton
2021	The Curse of Turandot	Simon Franglen
2021	Buckley's Chance	Christopher Gordon
2021	The Last Duel	Harry Gregson-Williams
2021	The Power of the Dog	Jonny Greenwood
2021	Spencer	Jonny Greenwood
