= As If to Nothing =

Studio album by Craig Armstrong
- Released: 19 February 2002
- Genre: Electronic music Orchestral music
- Label: EMI / Astralwerks

Craig Armstrong chronology
The Space Between Us (1998)	As If to Nothing (2002)	Piano Works (2004)

Professional ratings
Aggregate scores
Source	Rating
Metacritic	71/100
Review scores
Source	Rating
Allmusic	3.5/5 stars
Pitchfork Media	2.2/10

As If to Nothing is the second independent album by Scottish composer Craig Armstrong, featuring collaborations with Bono of U2, Mogwai, Photek, Evan Dando, King Crimson, and former Big Dish vocalist Steven Lindsay. It was released on 19 February 2002, on the EMI label in the United Kingdom, and Astralwerks in the United States.

The song "Finding Beauty" was also covered by the band Escala on their album Escala.

The song "Ruthless Gravity" was prominently featured in the 2004 film Layer Cake. The song was also used in an episode of Top Gear when the presenters were racing from Surrey to Monte Carlo in an Aston Martin DB9 and the TGV. "Stay (Faraway, So Close!)" is a cover version of the U2 song from their 1993 album Zooropa, and contains a vocal performance recorded by Bono in 2001 while the band was on its Elevation Tour.

== Track listing ==
1. "Ruthless Gravity" - 5:53
2. "Wake Up in New York" with Evan Dando - 3:30
3. "Miracle" with Mogwai - 3:21
4. "Amber" - 5:10
5. "Finding Beauty" - 3:40
6. "Waltz" with Antye Greie-Fuchs - 5:17
7. "Inhaler" - 4:59
8. "Hymn 2" with Photek - 4:49
9. "Snow" with David McAlmont - 3:54
10. "Starless II" with a sample from "Starless" (King Crimson - Red) - 4:37
11. "Stay (Faraway, So Close!)" with Bono - 6:02
12. "Niente" - 4:49
13. "Sea Song" with Wendy Stubbs - 6:14
14. "Let It Be Love" with Steven Lindsay - 3:49
15. "Choral Ending" - 2:49
