= Play (Bond album) =

Studio album by Bond
- Released: 26 June 2011
- Recorded: 2008–2010
- Genre: Classical crossover, electronic, synthpop
- Length: 46:44
- Label: Universal Music

Bond chronology
| Explosive: The Best of Bond (2005) | Play (2011) |

Play is Australian/British classical-electropop band Bond's fourth studio album. It was released on 26 June 2011. The album's release was revealed in an interview with Tania Davis in the Birmingham Mail, in which Davis stated that the band were then currently working on their next studio album. She also noted that the album would have gypsy, folk and Eastern European influences. In late 2010, the band were performing material from their new album Play at concerts in Mexico, including the single "Diablo".

The album was released in Mexico in June 2011 before being released in Korea in August 2011 and Japan in late September 2011. It was released on 13 January 2012 in Australia, and charted at #94 on the albums chart, and in the US on August 7, 2012.

Songs on the album include their first single "Diablo". The string quartet also showcases "Jai Ho", a huge hit from the movie Slumdog Millionaire. The album also features a few more recognizable hits. The song "Pump It" is a version of the song popularised by The Black Eyed Peas, which samples the Dick Dale and the Del-Tones' hit song "Misirlou", featured in the opening credits of Pulp Fiction. The song "Last Time" is an interpretation of "The Last Time" by The Rolling Stones, heavily sampled in "Bitter Sweet Symphony" by the band The Verve, per the alternate naming of the song. Then they re-released "The Last Time" as a remastered single for their upcoming remaster album on January 20, 2023. Then on February 17, 2023, they release a new track titled "Me and You" as their second single, taking off "Bond Goes GaGa" from the album. The remaster album was released in mid 2023.

== Track listing ==
| No. | Title | Writer(s) | Length |
|---|---|---|---|
| 1. | "Diablo" | Magnus Fiennes, Michael Lowley | 3:59 |
| 2. | "Jai Ho" | A. R. Rahman, Gulzar, Tanvi Shah | 3:38 |
| 3. | "Elysium" | Magnus Fiennes, Michael Lowley | 4:05 |
| 4. | "Pump It" | Nicholas Roubanis, William Adams, Allan Pineda, Stacy Ferguson, Thomas Van Musser | 3:40 |
| 5. | "Beatroot" | Gay-Yee Westerhoff | 2:39 |
| 6. | "Last Time" (aka Bittersweet) | Mick Jagger, Keith Richards | 3:43 |
| 7. | "Summer" | Antonio Vivaldi, arr. BOND | 3:16 |
| 8. | "Winter" | Antonio Vivaldi, arr. BOND | 4:02 |
| 9. | "Apasionada" | Magnus Fiennes, Michael Lowley | 3:41 |
| 10. | "West with the Night" | Eos Chater | 3:11 |
| 11. | "Road to Samarkand" | BOND, Magnus Fiennes, Ric Featherstone | 3:26 |
| 12. | "Victory 10" | Tonči Huljić | 3:11 |
| 13. | "Diablo" (vs. Young Offenders – bonus track) | Magnus Fiennes, Michael Lowley | 4:23 |

Asian bonus track
| No. | Title | Length |
|---|---|---|
| 14. | "Bond Go Gaga" (Lady Gaga Medley: "Alejandro", "Born This Way", "Poker Face", "Bad Romance", "Judas") | 3:54 |

== Release history ==
| Country | Date | Format | Label |
|---|---|---|---|
| Mexico | 28 June 2011 | CD, digital download | City Road Entertainment/Sony México |
| Korea | 16 August 2011 | CD, digital download | Universal Korea |
| Japan | 21 September 2011 | CD, SHM-CD+DVD | Universal Japan |
| United States | August 7, 2012 | digital download | City Road Entertainment/X5 Music Group |
