= Far from the Madding Crowd (soundtrack) =

2015 film soundtrack album

Far from the Madding Crowd (Original Motion Picture Soundtrack)

Film score by Craig Armstrong
- Released: 28 April 2015
- Venues: London; Dorset; Exeter
- Studios: Angel Recording Studios; Studio A; The Church Studios; Strongroom Music Studios; Sound Gallery Studios; St Osmund's Church
- Genre: Film score
- Length: 56:19
- Labels: Sony Classical; Fox Music
- Producers: Craig Armstrong; Kate St. John; Neill MacColl

Craig Armstrong chronology
The Great Gatsby (2013)	Far from the Madding Crowd (2015)	Victor Frankenstein (2015)

Far from the Madding Crowd (Original Motion Picture Soundtrack) is the film score composed by Craig Armstrong to the 2015 film Far from the Madding Crowd directed by Thomas Vinterberg and starred Carey Mulligan, Matthias Schoenaerts, Tom Sturridge, Michael Sheen, and Juno Temple. The album featured 24 tracks from Armstrong's original score as well as cast recordings and performances from folk musicians. The album was released through Sony Classical Records and Fox Music on 28 April 2015.

== Background ==
Craig Armstrong composed the musical score for Far from the Madding Crowd. Armstrong added that the music for the film accompanied folk music and hymns, from the late 19th and 20th century, something significant in Thomas Hardy's period. But instead of revisiting that period of early folk music, he built the soundscape of the score based on English composers Frederick Delius, Edward Elgar and Ralph Vaughan Williams, as he felt the Englishness would suit the film. Though despite focusing on the period music from Hardy's time, the soundscape still captured the sense of English Romanticism. The album further featured contributions from folk musicians and also songs performed by Carey Mulligan and Michael Sheen.

== Release ==
The soundtrack was released through Sony Classical Records and Fox Music on 28 April 2015.

== Reception ==
Jonathan Broxton of Movie Music UK wrote "Far From the Madding Crowd is a superb score in the great classical tradition; although it has no action sequences, and maintains a generally consistent tone throughout, the emotions that come flowing from the score are effortlessly beautiful, and the violin solos are worth the price of the purchase alone." Sean Wilson of Mfiles wrote "one of the most pleasurable aspects of Armstrong's score is how it pays homage to beloved romantic composers: it's sweeping when it needs to be yet also subtle when necessary, placing just as much emphasis on the inter-personal relationships as it does on capturing the Dorset landscape. Armstrong has always been a sensitive composer, pitching his music on the fine line between sentimentality and sincerity, and Far from the Madding Crowd finds him at the top of his game. Anchored by a selection of strong central themes, the score has a clear reverence for Thomas Hardy's text whilst also being emotionally accessible enough for a 21st century audience. Like Bathsheba herself, the score is fulsome, tentative, decisive and beautiful by turns, sure to be one of the highlights of the year."

Pete Simons of Synchrotones wrote "Far From the Madding Crowd is a wonderful score with lyrical themes and pastorale orchestrations. It's almost relentless in its beauty and use of strings [...] [it] is lush, romantic, dramatic, virtuous; and yet it's suitably restraint, making you feel the heart aches. One of Armstrong's finest scores to date, and one of this year's best so far." James Southall of Movie Wave wrote "Far From the Madding Crowd is very different from anything heard from the composer before and it's just gorgeous, one of the best things he's ever done. Romantic and beautiful but much more substantial than the Rachel Portman template usually applied to these things, it's a serious work and deserves a very wide audience. Certainly one of the scores of the year."

Scott Foundas of Variety wrote "Composer Craig Armstrong's richly orchestrated but sparingly used score does its best to articulate the bottled-up emotions the characters themselves can not." A. O. Scott of The New York Times wrote "the musical score (by Craig Armstrong) swells with melodramatic portent". Critic based at Classic FM wrote "All the drama and passion of the story is captured in Armstrong's warm, pastoral strings and orchestration. There are also nods to traditional British ballads, as well as the expected romantic cues." Alonso Duralde of TheWrap wrote that the film is "scored to a soaring fare-thee-well by Craig Armstrong". Dayna Papaleo of City called it a "gorgeously evocative score". Alison Rowat of The Herald said that Armstong "provides a suitably epic score".

== Track listing ==
No.	Title	Artist(s)	Length
1.	"Opening"	Craig Armstrong	4:39
2.	"Jerusalem the Golden" (based on a poem written by Bernard of Cluny which was adapted and composed by Alexander Ewing)	The Dorset Singers and Yeovil Chamber Choir	1:55
3.	"Corn Exchange"	Craig Armstrong	1:26
4.	"The Great Misunderstanding"	Craig Armstrong	2:24
5.	"Spring Sheep Dip"	Craig Armstrong	2:18
6.	"Oak Returns"	Craig Armstrong	2:17
7.	"Let No Man Steal Your Thyme"	Carey Mulligan and Michael Sheen	2:05
8.	"Never Been Kissed"	Craig Armstrong	3:01
9.	"Hollow in the Ferns"	Craig Armstrong	3:38
10.	"Bathsheba and Troy Wedding"	Craig Armstrong	3:05
11.	"Dribbles of Brandy"	The Eliza Carthy Band and Saul Rose	1:10
12.	"Swiss Boy"	The Eliza Carthy Band and Saul Rose	1:50
13.	"Fanny and Troy"	Craig Armstrong	4:04
14.	"Troy Swims Out"	Craig Armstrong	1:16
15.	"O Come, o come, Emmanuel"	The Dorset Singers and Yeovil Chamber Choir	2:47
16.	"Boldwood Variation"	Craig Armstrong	2:31
17.	"Michael Turner's Waltz"	The Eliza Carthy Band	1:47
18.	"Jenny Lind Polka"	The Eliza Carthy Band and Saul Rose	1:51
19.	"Time Moves On"	Craig Armstrong	1:08
20.	"Oak Leaves"	Craig Armstrong	1:10
21.	"Bathsheba and Oak Unite"	Craig Armstrong	1:35
22.	"End Credits"	Craig Armstrong	2:08
23.	"Let No Man Steal Your Thyme"	Carey Mulligan	2:32
24.	"Love Theme"	Craig Armstrong	3:42
Total length:			56:19

== Personnel ==
Credits adapted from liner notes:

- Music composer, producer and arranger – Craig Armstrong
- On-set music producers – Kate St. John, Neill MacColl
- Programmer – Scott Fraser
- Dorset music research – Virginia Astley
- Additional music research – Eliza Carthy
- Engineer – Chris Parker
- Recording – Rupert Coulson
- Mixing – Andy Bradfield
- Assistant mixing – Aaron Butler
- Mastering – Simon Francis
- Music editor – Yann McCullough
- Additional music editor – Michael Connell, Paul Chandler
- Musical assistance – Emma Ford
- Copyist – Dakota Music Service
- Liner notes – Craig Armstrong, Kate St. John, Neill MacColl
- Booklet editor and design – WLP Ltd

Musicians

- Folk musicians – Bethany Porter, Eliza Carthy, James Delarre, John G. Smith, Laurence Hunt, Nic Hurst, Simon Richie
- Folk musicians' recording and mixing – Ian Dowling
- Organ – Reverend Graham Perryman
- Piano – Craig Armstrong, Dave Arch, Simon Chamberlain
- Cast vocals – Carey Mulligan, Michael Sheen
- Cast vocals recording – Duncan Chave
- Solo violin – Clio Gould

Orchestra

- Orchestrators – Craig Armstrong, Dave Foster, Rob Sneddon
- Orchestra conductor – Cecilia Weston
- Orchestra contractor – Isobel Griffiths
- Assistant orchestra contractor – Lucy Whalley
- Orchestra leader – Perry Montague-Mason

Choir

- Choir – Dorset Singers, Yeovil Chamber Choir
- Choirmaster – Helen Brind
- Choir recording – Paul Sanderson, Steve Wright

Management

- Business and legal affairs (Fox Music) – Tom Cavanaugh
- Music clearance (Fox Music) – Ellen Ginsburg
- Licensing (Sony Classical Records) – Mark Cavell
- Executive in charge of music (Fox Music) – Danielle Diego
- Product development (Sony Classical Records) – Guido Eitberger
- Production supervisor (Fox Music) – Rebecca Morellato
- Music supervisor (Fox Music) – Anton Monsted

== Accolades ==
Award	Category	Recipient(s)	Result	Ref.
International Film Music Critics Association	Best Original Score for a Drama Film	Craig Armstrong	Nominated	
