= There Be Dragons (soundtrack) =

2012 film soundtrack album

There Be Dragons: Secretos De Pasion (Original Motion Picture Soundtrack)

Film score by Robert Folk
- Released: 7 February 2012
- Recorded: 2011
- Genre: Film score
- Length: 52:10
- Label: Varèse Sarabande

Robert Folk chronology
Havana Heat (2011)	There Be Dragons (2012)	The Secret Village (2013)

There Be Dragons: Secretos De Pasion (Original Motion Picture Soundtrack) is the film score to the 2012 film There Be Dragons directed by Roland Joffé. The album featured the film score for the recut version, composed by Robert Folk, while the original cut was scored by Stephen Warbeck. The original score was released through the Varèse Sarabande record label on 7 February 2012.

== Background ==
The initial edit of There Be Dragons had a score composed by Stephen Warbeck. Since Joffé felt dissatisfied with the edit, with much of the technicalities, including the musical score was not the way he intended especially in terms of the pacing of the score. Robert Folk was brought in to compose the re-edited version. Though Folk liked Warbeck's original score, he understood the shortcomings of the film and what Joffé had intended. One of the most important aspects that Joffé wanted is the sense of movement in the pacing of the score from the beginning to end, and a lot of work resulted on the editing. Folk also agreed the music being the central character and part of the revamp was regarded on how Joffé and the executive producer James intended to aim the international audiences.

Folk was asked to write five different themes for the film specifically linked to various characters and emotions in the film. Folk described it as similar to watching an operatic performance. Folk considered Joffé to be an incredibly dynamic filmmaker considering his high energy and charisma, as well as his proficiency as a writer, despite him being 60-year-old. Folk went ahead with Joffé and James in terms of the specific approach that they had in mind, for the new version of the film. James had a central role in the reworking of the new version. The replacement of the music came with strong ideas which resulted in his contribution to come up with those themes the crew members were looking for. Folk was considered as an interpreter on the filmmaker's design for this particular score.

== Release ==
Varèse Sarabande released a soundtrack album for the re-cut's score on 7 February 2012.

== Reception ==
Though Stephen Warbeck's music for the original version received much positive response, with Variety's Peter Debruge and SFGate's Susan Granger calling it "rousing" and "stirring". Robert Folk's score has been raved by music critics. James Southall of Movie Wave wrote "The only minor flaw which stops it being on that level is that literally everything is made to sound big and important [...] but I'm sure that most won't be overly concerned with that. What a wonderful surprise and true joy this album is." Thomas Glorieux of Maintitles wrote "There be Dragons is unbelievably powerful, and UN-Hollywood like bombastic and thematic, but it also lacks originality and development after a while (just like a Brian Tyler effort). And something tells me, it would have made this the release of the year, if it followed a more streamlined approach. But that doesn't stop me from recommending this if you want one sheer emotional powerhouse piece after another.. Because every track is big for some apparent reason." Cinematic Sound Radio ranked it at number third of one of the best film scores of 2012.

== Track listing ==
No.	Title	Length
1.	"Main Titles"	1:57
2.	"Battle Begins"	1:04
3.	"Romance"	2:35
4.	"More Dad"	1:17
5.	"Killing Priests"	3:53
6.	"Love & War Finale"	2:52
7.	"Robert's Investigation"	3:36
8.	"Change Plans"	2:43
9.	"Hanging Bridge Battle"	0:53
10.	"Manolo Starts His Story"	1:32
11.	"Pray For Him"	2:29
12.	"Kidnap & Kill"	2:41
13.	"Priest's Calling"	2:29
14.	"Battle For Madrid"	2:10
15.	"Franco's Government Files"	1:57
16.	"Oriol Is Dead"	2:38
17.	"Manolo Meets Generals"	1:36
18.	"Lord Open My Eyes"	1:30
19.	"Idilko By The Lake"	1:42
20.	"Train Station Patriots"	0:40
21.	"The Priest, I Knew Him"	0:57
22.	"Who To Kill"	3:17
23.	"Factory Strike"	1:02
24.	"At First Sight"	0:46
25.	"Sitting Ducks"	1:04
26.	"A Baby Is Born"	0:47
27.	"Then God Is Just"	0:40
28.	"An Epic Story"	1:23
Total length:		52:10

== Accolades ==
Awards	Category	Recipient(s)	Result	Ref.
International Film Music Critics Association	Best Original Score for a Drama Film	Robert Folk	Nominated	
