= Explosive: The Best of Bond =

Greatest hits album by Bond
- Released: 28 June 2005
- Recorded: 2000–2004
- Genre: Classical crossover, electronic
- Length: 41:44
- Label: Decca
- Producer: Mel Bush

Bond chronology
Classified (2004)	Explosive: The Best of Bond (2005)	Play (2011)

Explosive: the Best of Bond is a compilation album by the crossover classical string quartet Bond. As well as the audio CD, the album also contains a DVD which has three music videos, a photo gallery, their complete discography, and all the tracks on Dolby Digital 5.1 Surround Sound or 48 kHz/16 bit PCM Stereo. The CD also contains three previously unreleased tracks. There is also a DualDisc edition of the album.

== Track listing ==
1. "Victory" (Mike Batt mix) – 3:25
2. "Explosive" – 3:10
3. "Fuego" – 2:59
4. "Viva!" – 3:15
5. "Shine" (Dubshakra mix) – 3:56
6. "Wintersun" – 3:27
7. "Scorchio" – 3:31
8. "Duel" – 4:13
9. "Gypsy Rhapsody" – 3:35
10. "Caravan" – 3:44
11. "Sugarplum" – 2:21
12. "Carmina" – 4:20

iTunes bonus track

13. "Innocent" – 3:17

=== DVD ===
- "Explosive" (promo video)
- "Fuego" (promo video)
- "Victory" (promo video)
- Photo gallery
- Discography
- Tracks in 5.1 Dolby Surround

== Charts ==
Chart performance for Explosive: The Best of Bond
Chart (2024)	Peak position
Austrian Albums (Ö3 Austria)	48
UK Albums (OCC)	88
