= Dalziel + Scullion =

Scottish artist duo

- Known for: Photography; Video; Sound; Sculpture
- Movement: Environmental art and land art
- Website: dalzielscullion.com

Matthew Dalziel (born 1957) and Louise Scullion (born 1966), known professionally as Dalziel + Scullion, are a Scottish artist duo. Dalziel and Scullion have worked in collaboration since 1993. Their studio creates artworks in photography, video, sound, and sculpture that explore new artistic languages surrounding the subject of ecology.

== Biography ==
Matthew Dalziel was born in Irvine, Scotland in 1957. He studied sculpture at Duncan of Jordanstone College of Art and graduated in 1988, continuing on to study documentary photography on the then-singular course of its type in the UK, established by Magnum photographer David Hurn at Newport College of Further Education in Newport. Matthew completed his education with a Post Graduate diploma, jointly in Fine Art Photography and Sculpture, at Glasgow School of Art and was awarded a merit of high distinction in both subjects. He has exhibited in numerous shows including the 1990 British Art Show and was a founding member of the Glasgow artist group Image & Installation; he served on various Scottish Arts Council Visual Arts Awards Panels and was on the board of directors for Photofeis, International Festival of Photography.

Louise Scullion was born in Helensburgh, Scotland in 1966. She studied Fine Art at Glasgow School of Art in the Environmental Art Department, graduating in 1988 with first-class honours. She then exhibited in numerous shows including the 1990 British Art Show; she has served on various boards and committees including the board of directors of the CCA Glasgow, The Scottish Arts Council Visual Arts Awards Panel, and The Creative Scotland award panel.

Since 1993, when Matthew Dalziel and Louise Scullion began a collaborative practice, Dalziel + Scullion have produced several artworks shown nationally and internationally including the Venice Biennale; Young British Art in Rome; The Scottish National Gallery of Modern Art, Edinburgh; The Australian Centre for Contemporary Art, Melbourne; Madison Square Park, New York; The National Maritime Museum, London and at The Meguro Museum of Modern Art, Tokyo. Their practice is currently based within the University of Dundee where they also teach in the School of Fine Art.

== Artwork ==
Film & video

- Endlessly – 1997 – Video Installation comprising two large architecturally influenced constructions with back projected video.
- The Pressure of Spring – 1999 – A video work that looks at a series of young people who lives are at transitional phases: between school and work place, between teenage and adulthood. With sound by Howie B.
- Another Place – 2000 – A video work consisting of a series of location-based portraits filmed in the north east of Scotland in the village of St. Combs.
- Water Falls Down – 2002 – Video work constructed in three parts, with sound by Geir Jenssen.
- In the Open Sea – 2002 – The piece presents aspects of the wilder habitats we inhabit and how we access and control these spaces.
- Raptor – 2002 – A video piece where a bird of prey inhabits the interior of a contemporary office space.
- Genus – 2003 – A large scale 7 screen combined video projection. Genus was the culmination of Dalziel + Scullions 2-year Fellowship with the National Media Museum, during which hundreds of images from the museums archive were collected to create this work.
- Earthdom – 2005 – A twin-screen video work that looks at the expansive landscape of the Fenlands and its liquid topography.
- One Minute – 2005 – This work consisted of a series of 15 one-minute studies of cloud formations filmed over specific geographic locations within Scotland, presented alongside the premier of musician and composer Craig Armstrong's symphonic work.
- Some Distance from the Sun – 2006 – An evolution of plant types, observing the major 'steps' that have taken place as plants evolved out of water to land, with sound by Mark Vernon.
- The Earth Turned to bring Us Closer – 2006 – A three screen video installation shows over 240 video portraits shot in the city of Glasgow and is accompanied Craig Armstrong's composition Memory Takes My Hand.
- Source – 2007 – In this video work, a journey within a landscape is experienced through the senses of a young boy; his eyes and ears become portals that sights and sound flow through.

Sculpture

- The Horn – 1997 – An outdoor work in Polkemmet Country Park, commissioned for the midpoint of the M8 Motorway running between Scotland's largest cities, Glasgow and Edinburgh.
- Modern Nature – 2000 – The work consists of six tall (varying between 5 and 6 metres high) aluminium structures, grouped like a glade of trees, which house solar panels powering a sound system.
- Rain – 2000 – A temporary architectural structure that looked at the phenomenon of wet rainy weather.
- Voyager – 2000 – Three full size expedition tents cast in aluminium.
- Ontological Garden – 2003 – The work was made as a permanent outdoor piece for the Royal Aberdeen Children's Hospital.
- Latitude – 2006 – Video installation comprising a steel tripod structure on which a projector and screen slowly rotate in a rising and dipping 360° arc.
- Catalyst – 2008 – Catalyst is a permanent work sited in the cultural quarter of Dundee in Scotland.

Photography

- Aura A – 2002 – Consisting of four photographic images that combine contemporary images of landscapes with archive images documenting influential human activity on the land from the mid-1800s.
- Drift – 2001 – An installation comprising four large-scale photographic images, each image portrays different aspects of the animated forces that created the glacial valley of Jostedalsbreen in Norway.
- Storm – 2003 – The installation takes the form of a 5m x 7.5m back-projection screen onto which a series of 26 different photographic images are projected each day.
- More Than Us – 2008 – This work explores the habitat of the rare day flying moth, the slender Scotch burnet and examines the interconnected ecology vital for the moth's existence, this tiny moth can be found on just four colonies on the west coast of Scotland.
- Unknown Pines – 2007 – A series of six 'studio portraits' of pine trees, focusing only on their bark surface, in each, different evolutionary variations are revealed, whilst other information such as leaf structure, scale and location are withheld.
- Breath Taking – 2003 – A photographic Billboard Project in cities throughout the UK including Aberdeen, Birmingham, Dundee, Edinburgh, Glasgow, Liverpool, London, Newcastle and Manchester.

== Awards ==
- 1997 – Scottish Arts Council National Lottery Award.
- 2000 – BAFTA Nomination (Best director, New Talent)
- 2001 – Scottish Arts Council (Major Bursary) Visual Artist Award
- 2002 – Carnegie Award, PESCA Award
- 2002–03 – Fellowship, Museum of Photography, Film and television, Bradford
- 2004 – Royal Incorporation of Architects Creativity Award
- 2005 – The Eco Prize For Creativity, Creative Scotland Award, The Saltire Award For Art in Architecture
- 2007 – The Saltire Award for Art in Architecture
- 2008 – Short listed for the international Artes Mundi Prize

== Publications ==
- Collier, Caroline; McRae, Lesley; South Bank Centre.; et al. (1990). The British Art Show (exhibition catalogue). London: South Bank Centre. ISBN 978-1-85332-054-5. OCLC 187437833.
- Gallagher, Ann; Roberts, James; British Council; et al. (1995). General release : young British artists at Scuola di San Pasquale, Venice, 1995 (exhibition catalogue). London: British Arts Council. OCLC 34030820.
- Codognato, Mario (1996). Artiste Britannica a Roma. Stanze della memoria. [Torino]: Umberto Allemandi. ISBN 978-88-422-0625-5. OCLC 271098797.
- Dalziel, Matthew; Scullion, Louise; Fruit Market Gallery; et al. (2001). Dalziel + Scullion : Home (exhibition catalogue). Edinburgh: Fruitmarket Gallery. ISBN 978-0-947912-08-6. OCLC 49238117.
- Oliveira, Nicolas De; Oxley, Nicola; Petry, Michael (2003). Installation art in the new millennium : the empire of the senses. New York: Thames and Hudson. ISBN 978-0-500-23808-0. LCCN 2003100799. OCLC 53466997.
- Lowenstein, Oliver; Ingram, Hugh; Dalziel + Scullion.; Aberdeen Art Gallery (Aberdeen) (2007). Dalziel + Scullion : some distance from the sun (exhibition catalogue). Aberdeen: Peacock Visual Arts. ISBN 978-0-9543574-8-1. OCLC 501415616.
- Tufnell, Ben (2007). Land Art. London: Tate. ISBN 978-1-85437-604-6. LCCN 2007390964. OCLC 70128580.
- Garraud, Colette (2007). L'artiste contemporain et la nature : parcs et paysages européens (in French). Paris: Ed. Hazan. ISBN 978-2-85025-987-6. LCCN 2008359226. OCLC 421680186.
- The Earth Turned to Bring Us Closer. Hagamle Prestegard. 2008.
- Jackson, Tessa; Artes Mundi (Organization) (2008). Artes Mundi. 3 : gwobr ac arddangosfa gelf weledol ryngwladol Cymru 2008 [Wales international visual art exhibition and prize 2008] (in English and Welsh). Cardiff: Artes Mundi Prize. ISBN 978-0-9552379-1-1. OCLC 312624656.
- Best, Suky; Sinclair, Iain; Willmoth, Simon; et al. (2008). Silicon Fen. London: Film and Video Umbrella. ISBN 978-1-904270-27-0. OCLC 319587781.
- Elwes, Catherine; Ball, Steven (2008). Figuring landscapes, artist's moving image from Australia and the UK. [London]: International Centre for Fine Art Research Camberwell College of Arts, University of the Arts London. ISBN 978-1-84638-047-1. LCCN 2009512931. OCLC 327342082.
- Dalziel + Scullion (2009). More Than Us, conversations between humanity, the arts & ecology. [S.I.]: Scottish Natural Heritage. ISBN 978-1-85397-580-6. OCLC 727107030.
