= The Space Between Us (album) =

Studio album by Craig Armstrong
- Released: February 24, 1998
- Length: 58:23
- Label: Melankolic; Caroline Records

Craig Armstrong chronology
The Space Between Us (1998)	As If to Nothing (2002)

Professional ratings
Review scores
Source	Rating
Allmusic	4/5 stars

The Space Between Us is the debut solo album by Craig Armstrong, originally released in 1998 on Melankolic Records. Elizabeth Fraser of Cocteau Twins contributes vocals to the track "This Love", and The Blue Nile's Paul Buchanan appears on "Let's Go Out Tonight", which is a rework of the song of the same name by Blue Nile. The first track, "Weather Storm", is a reworking of a song by the same name which appears on Massive Attack's 1994 album, Protection, to which Armstrong contributed. Both versions of "Weather Storm" use a phrase taken from "Autumnal", a 1972 work by Anthony Phillips, to be found on his 1979 album Private Parts & Pieces. Similarly, "Sly II" is a reworked version of Massive Attack's "Sly", also from Protection. "Balcony Scene" is a reworked version of "Time Stands Still," from the score of the 1996 film Romeo + Juliet; it contains elements of "Kissing You" by Des'ree, as well as a quote from the film.

== Track listing ==
1. "Weather Storm" – 6:03
2. "This Love" – 6:26
3. "Sly II" – 5:17
4. "After the Storm" – 5:08
5. "Laura's Theme" – 5:26
6. "My Father" – 2:03
7. "Balcony Scene (Romeo and Juliet)" – 5:17
8. "Rise" – 4:24
9. "Glasgow" – 5:19
10. "Let's Go Out Tonight" – 5:58
11. "Childhood" – 5:42
12. "Hymn" – 1:20
