= Piano Works (Craig Armstrong album) =

Studio album by Craig Armstrong
- Released: October 5, 2004
- Genre: Ambient downtempo neo-classical
- Length: 67:22
- Label: Sanctuary Records

Craig Armstrong chronology
As If to Nothing (2002)	Piano Works (2004)	Film Works 1995-2005 (2005)

Professional ratings
Review scores
Source	Rating
Allmusic	link
Music Box	link

Piano Works is the third album of Craig Armstrong, containing solo piano pieces from different soundtracks played by himself.

== Track listing ==
All tracks are written by Craig Armstrong.

No.	Title	Length
1.	"In My Own Words"	2:44
2.	"Heatmiser 2"	4:01
3.	"Hidden"	1:50
4.	"Gentle Piece"	2:55
5.	"Weather Storm"	3:50
6.	"Diffuse"	1:17
7.	"Leaving Paris"	2:40
8.	"Fugue"	2:53
9.	"Theme From Orphans"	1:46
10.	"1st Waltz"	2:48
11.	"Satine's Theme"	0:33
12.	"Morning Breaks"	1:37
13.	"Laura's Theme"	2:37
14.	"Glasgow Love Theme"	2:02
15.	"Delay"	2:09
16.	"Hymn 3"	4:55
17.	"Angelina"	1:53
18.	"Childhood 2"	5:31
19.	"Sunrise"	2:20
20.	"Be Still My Soul" (Bonus Track)	5:50
