= Classified (Bond album) =

Studio album by Bond
- Released: 15 June 2004
- Recorded: December 2003 – March 2004
- Genre: Classical crossover, electronic, synthpop
- Length: 47:44
- Label: Decca
- Producer: Mel Bush

Bond chronology
| Remixed (2003) | Classified (2004) | Explosive: The Best of Bond (2005) |

Professional ratings
Review scores
| Source | Rating |
|---|---|
| AllMusic | link |

Classified is the third studio album and fourth overall album released through Decca Records by the classical crossover string quartet Bond. Lead single "Explosive" was released as a double A-side with a different version of "Highly Strung". This updated version featured on the special edition of Classified.

Popular worldwide, Classified found success in Australia where it went double platinum. "Explosive" was also picked to be the Australian theme for the 2004 Athens Olympic Games.

"Explosive" is also used regularly during New York Rangers ice hockey games at Madison Square Garden as the intermission music prior to a shootout, should the game reach that phase.

In Japan, a special edition with different artwork was released. It features three bonus tracks ("Caravan", "Carmina" and "Sugarplum"), which were later featured on their greatest hits album Explosive: The Best of Bond.

== Track listing ==
| Title | US | Hong Kong, Taiwan, UK | Japan | Latin America | Length |
|---|---|---|---|---|---|
| "Explosive" | 1 | 1 | 1 | 1 | 3:12 |
| "Scorchio" | 5 | 2 | 2 | 5 | 3:31 |
| "Midnight Garden" | 3 | 3 | 3 | 3 | 4:07 |
| "Fly Robin Fly" | 4 | | | 4 | 3:09 |
| "Lullaby" | 6 | 4 | 4 | 6 | 3:48 |
| "Samba" | 2 | 5 | 5 | 2 | 3:35 |
| "Hungarian" | 7 | 6 | 6 | 7 | 3:00 |
| "I'll Fly Away" | 8 | 7 | 7 | 8 | 3:10 |
| "Dream Star" | 9 | 8 | 8 | 9 | 4:38 |
| "Highly Strung" | 10 | 9 | 9 | 10 | 3:30 |
| "Adagio For Strings" | 11 | 10 | 10 | 11 | 4:24 |
| "Señorita" | 12 | 11 | 11 | 12 | 4:27 |
| "Explosive" (Ed Leal Mix) | 13 | 12 | 12 | 13 | 3:10 |
| "Sugarplum" | | | 13 | | 2:21 |
| "Carmina" | | | 14 | | 4:20 |
| "Caravan" | | | 15 | | 3:44 |

=== Bonus videos ===
- "Explosive" (Promo video)
- Making of "Explosive"
- "Samba" (Promo video)

== Charts ==
| Chart (2004) | Peak position |
|---|---|
| Australian Albums (ARIA) | 1 |
| Austrian Albums (Ö3 Austria) | 26 |
| Belgian Albums (Ultratop Wallonia) | 85 |
| French Albums (SNEP) | 95 |
| Swiss Albums (Schweizer Hitparade) | 73 |
| UK Albums (OCC) | 32 |
| US Billboard 200 | 76 |
| US Top Classical Albums (Billboard) | 2 |

== Certifications ==
| Region | Certification | Certified units/sales |
|---|---|---|
| Australia (ARIA) | Platinum | 70,000^{^} |
^{^} Shipments figures based on certification alone.
