= Born (Bond album) =

Studio album by Bond
- Released: 2 October 2000
- Recorded: May 2000
- Genres: Classical crossover, electronic, synthpop
- Length: 61:26
- Label: Decca Records
- Producers: Magnus Fiennes, Gareth Cousins

Bond chronology
Born (2000)	Shine (2002)

Born is the first album released by the classical crossover string quartet Bond, and was produced by Magnus Fiennes and Gareth Cousins. The album was a worldwide success, reaching the top twenty in charts across Europe. The album reached number 16 in the UK charts, spending six weeks in the top 40, and was also number one in the UK Classical charts, but it was subsequently removed from these charts for not meeting all the 'rules' of classical music.

The album was re-released in 2001 with an additional track.

== Track listing ==
All tracks are written by Tonči Huljić, except where noted.

=== 2000 release ===
No.	Title	Writer(s)	Length
1.	"Quixote"	Magnus Fiennes	4:44
2.	"Winter"	Yoad Nevo, Gil Brown	5:42
3.	"Victory"		4:40
4.	"Oceanic"	Magnus Fiennes	6:42
5.	"Kismet"	Gay-Yee Westerhoff	5:12
6.	"Korobushka"	Traditional, arr. Magnus Fiennes, Brian Gascoigne	4:48
7.	"Alexander the Great"		2:57
8.	"Duel"		4:20
9.	"Bella Donna"	Eos Chater	3:15
10.	"The 1812"	Pyotr Ilyich Tchaikovsky, arr. Gareth Cousins, Julian Kershaw	6:37
11.	"Dalalai"		4:06
12.	"Hymn"	Magnus Fiennes	4:50
13.	"Victory (Mike Batt Mix)"		3:25

=== 2001 re-release ===
No.	Title	Writer(s)	Length
14.	"Viva!"	Antonio Vivaldi, arr. Del!	3:14

Track 2 renamed "Wintersun", shortened to 3:26.

== Charts ==
=== Weekly charts ===
Chart (2000–01)	Peak position
Australian Albums (ARIA)	14
Austrian Albums (Ö3 Austria)	19
Belgian Albums (Ultratop Wallonia)	8
Danish Albums (Hitlisten)	12
Dutch Albums (Album Top 100)	45
French Albums (SNEP)	15
German Albums (Offizielle Top 100)	59
Hungarian Albums (MAHASZ)	15
Italian Albums (FIMI)	10
New Zealand Albums (RMNZ)	10
Norwegian Albums (VG-lista)	12
Swedish Albums (Sverigetopplistan)	7
Swiss Albums (Schweizer Hitparade)	38
UK Albums (Official Charts)	16
US Billboard 200	108
US Top Classical Albums (Billboard)	1

=== Year-end charts ===
Chart (2000)	Position
UK Albums (OCC)	87

Chart (2001)	Position
Belgian Albums (Ultratop Wallonia)	29
French Albums (SNEP)	64
UK Albums (OCC)	187

== Certifications ==
Region	Certification	Certified units/sales
Australia (ARIA)	Gold	35,000^{^}
United Kingdom (BPI)	Gold	100,000^{^}
^{^} Shipments figures based on certification alone.
