= Craig Armstrong (composer) =

Scottish composer (born 1959)

Craig Armstrong OBE

Background information
- Born: Craig Mackenzie Armstrong; 29 April 1959 (age 67)
- Origin: Shettleston, Glasgow, Scotland
- Genres: Classical; Contemporary classical Electronic; Alternative rock
- Occupations: Musician, composer
- Years active: 1977–present
- Website: www.craigarmstrong.com

Craig Mackenzie Armstrong OBE (born 29 April 1959) is a Scottish composer of modern orchestral music, electronica and film scores. He graduated from the Royal Academy of Music in 1981, and has since written music for the Royal Shakespeare Company, the Royal Scottish National Orchestra and the London Sinfonietta.

Armstrong's score for Baz Luhrmann's Romeo + Juliet earned him a BAFTA for Achievement in Film Music and an Ivor Novello. He would collaborate with Luhrmann again on his next two films, Moulin Rouge! and The Great Gatsby. His score for the former earned him the 2001 American Film Institute's composer of the Year award, a Golden Globe Award for Best Original Score and a BAFTA. Armstrong was awarded a Grammy Award for Best Original Score in 2004 for the biopic Ray. His other feature film scoring credits include Love Actually, Oliver Stone's World Trade Center, Elizabeth: The Golden Age and The Incredible Hulk.

== Life and career ==
Armstrong was born in Shettleston, Glasgow, Scotland.

He studied musical composition, violin and piano at the Royal Academy of Music from 1977 to 1981, where his teachers included Cornelius Cardew and Malcolm MacDonald He was awarded the Charles Lucas prize and the Harvey Lohr scholarship for composition, the FTCL Fellowship in composition, and also won the GLAA Young Jazz Musician of the Year in 1982. Upon completing his studies, Armstrong served as music and dance specialist at the Strathclyde Regional Council in 1984. In 1985 Armstrong toured with Midge Ure on his Gift World Tour, and with Ultravox on their european U-Vox Tour winter 1986. Between 1994–2002 he was commissioned by the Royal Shakespeare Company to write music for The Broken Heart and The Tempest, both directed by Michael Boyd.

He sees no difference in credibility between popular and classical forms and this respect for the pop genre was cemented in 1994 with a one-off collaboration with the Bristol band Massive Attack on their album Protection, after which the band formed their Melankolic vanity record label releasing his first two solo albums.

In 2001, Armstrong received BAFTA, Golden Globe, and American Film Institute Award, as well as World Soundtrack Award and a Golden Satellite Award for Moulin Rouge!. In 2002 he wrote the meditative piece Visconti, commissioned by Barbican Centre Elektronika festival for the London Sinfonietta. In 2004 Armstrong collaborated with visual artists Dalziel + Scullion on One Minute to celebrate the opening of Perth's Horsecross Hall. In 2005 he received a Grammy Award for Best Score Soundtrack album for the film Ray, directed by Taylor Hackford. In 2008 his first classical release, Memory Takes My Hand, featuring a violin concerto for Clio Gould, was released on EMI Classics. Armstrong has had many collaborations including recording and performing the album Dolls with the Berlin laptop artist AGF and Vladislav Delay. He has worked with a wide variety of more well-known musical artists, including U2, Tina Turner, Madonna, Texas, and Luciano Pavarotti.

Armstrong has written several classical commissions for the Royal Scottish National Orchestra, the London Sinfonietta, the Hebrides Ensemble and the Scottish Ensemble. In 2006, Armstrong collaborated with the visual artists Dalziel + Scullion for the reopening of the Kelvingrove Art Gallery in Glasgow with a joint exhibition called Once. In 2007 Armstrong's first opera was premiered as part of the Scottish Opera, titled '5:15 – Opera's made in Scotland', a 15min opera with a libretto by Ian Rankin. In 2020, The Edge of the Sea, a collaboration with Calum Martin of music inspired by Gaelic psalm was released. Armstrong had experienced the tradition from church services at Hilton, on visits to his mother's family in Balintore in Easter Ross.

== Honours ==
OBE ribbon

Armstrong was appointed Officer of the Order of the British Empire (OBE) in the 2010 New Year Honours for his contribution to music.

== Key works ==
- 1994: Slow Movement (strings)
- 1998: 20 Movements (orchestra)
- 1999: If Time Must Pass (violin, strings)
- 1999: Escape (orchestra, vocal).
- 2000: When Morning Turns to Light (mezzo-soprano, orchestra)
- 2002: Northern Sounds ... Islands (orchestra)
- 2005: One Minute (orchestra)
- 2007: Immer (violin concerto no. 1) (violin, orchestra)
- 2012: The Lady from the Sea (opera)

== Recordings ==
Armstrong has released two solo records on Massive Attack's label Melankolic, followed by Piano Works on Sanctuary in 2004 and Film Works on Universal in 2005. In 2007 Armstrong recorded his first classical record, "Memory Takes My Hand", for EMI Classics with the BBC Symphony Orchestra. It was released in 2008 and includes a violin concerto "Immer" for Clio Gould.

Rosebud was released from a new co written and co produced project of Craig Armstrong and Scott Fraser – Winona. September 2009: "Without You (Deal Soul Brothers Remix)" – Format: 12" Vinyl single

- 1998: The Space Between Us
- 2002: As If to Nothing
- 2004: Piano Works
- 2005: Film Works 1995–2005
- 2005: The Dolls by the Dolls (Armstrong with Antye Greie and Vladislav Delay)
- 2008: Memory Takes My Hand
- 2014: It's Nearly Tomorrow
- 2018: Sun On You

== Film scores ==
His score to William Shakespeare's Romeo + Juliet (with Baz Luhrmann) earned him a BAFTA for Achievement in Film Music and an Ivor Novello. Armstrong's score for Baz Luhrmann's groundbreaking musical Moulin Rouge! earned him AFI's Composer of the Year award, a Golden Globe Award for Best Original Score of the Year and a BAFTA for Achievement in Film Music. His score for Phillip Noyce's The Quiet American garnered him the Ivor Novello Award for Best Original Film Score. His other feature film scoring credits include the Oliver Stone drama World Trade Center, the Oscar-winning bio-pic Ray for which Armstrong was awarded a Grammy Award for Best Original Score and the ensemble comedy Love Actually. His scores can also be heard in The Magdalene Sisters, Kiss of the Dragon, The Bone Collector, The Clearing, Best Laid Plans, Orphans, Elizabeth: The Golden Age and The Incredible Hulk.

=== Escape ===
One of the most popular tracks composed by Armstrong is "Escape" from Plunkett & Macleane. The composition was used in the pilot of the 2000 science fiction series Dark Angel', as well as having been used in various film trailers and sports broadcasts due to the emotional buildup caused by its rising crescendo and choir.

It was used in the trailer for the BBC's Euro 2012 coverage (the BBC had already used 'Balcony Scene' from the Romeo + Juliet soundtrack for their Euro 2004 trailer), and has often been used in the BBC's Top Gear series at the climax of the season finale "epic challenges". Armstrong lists the songs which Top Gear has used on his web site. "Escape" has been used in a number of action film trailers, including Spider-Man 2 and Daredevil.

"Escape" has also been used as entrance music by various sports teams, including the professional wrestling stable Team Vision, Premier League football team Aston Villa when playing at their home ground Villa Park, as well as fellow Premier League team Wigan Athletic when at the DW Stadium. It has also been used as entrance music for the England rugby union team at Twickenham stadium, Premiership rugby union team Leeds Carnegie before home games, and Kent County Cricket Club in Twenty20 matches.

=== Filmography ===
- 1995: Close (Short)
- 1995: Fridge (Short)
- 1995: Good Day for the Bad Guys
- 1996: Romeo + Juliet – BAFTA and Ivor Novello awards.
- 1997: Orphans
- 1998: The Negotiator – Opening credit track ("Rise")
- 1999: Plunkett & Macleane
- 1999: Best Laid Plans
- 1999: The Bone Collector
- 2000: Romeo Must Die
- 2001: Moulin Rouge! – Golden Globe Award for Best Original Score
- 2001: Kiss of the Dragon
- 2002: The Magdalene Sisters
- 2002: The Quiet American
- 2003: Love Actually
- 2003: Lara Croft: Tomb Raider – The Cradle of Life – Track ("Lab Scene")
- 2004: The Clearing
- 2004: Ray – Grammy Award for Best Original Score
- 2004: Layer Cake – Track ("Ruthless Gravity")
- 2005: Fever Pitch
- 2005: Must Love Dogs
- 2006: World Trade Center
- 2007: Elizabeth: The Golden Age (with A. R. Rahman)
- 2008: The Incredible Hulk
- 2010: Wall Street: Money Never Sleeps
- 2010: Neds
- 2011: In Time
- 2013: The Great Gatsby
- 2015: Far from the Madding Crowd
- 2015: Victor Frankenstein
- 2016: Me Before You
- 2016: Snowden
- 2016: Bridget Jones's Baby
- 2019: Mrs Lowry & Son
- 2019: The Burnt Orange Heresy
- 2020: The One and Only Ivan
- 2021: The Most Reluctant Convert
- 2023: The Great Escaper
