= Shine (Bond album) =

Studio album by Bond
- Released: 15 October 2002
- Recorded: Spring 2002
- Genre: Classical crossover, electronic
- Length: 57:08
- Label: Decca
- Producer: Magnus Fiennes/Various

Bond chronology
Born (2000)	Shine (2002)	Remixed (2003)

Shine is the second album released by the classical crossover string quartet Bond. It peaked at No. 26 on the UK Albums Chart, and went Gold in six countries. While it peaked at No. 61 on the US Billboard 200 albums chart, it spent five consecutive weeks at No. 1 on the Classical Crossover charts. Bond described the album as having "slightly more ethnic undertones" than their first album.

== Track listing ==
UK, Japan	US	Title	Composed by	Length
1	1	"Allegretto"	Karl Jenkins, arr and Produced: The Beatmasters	3:54
2	2	"Shine"	Magnus Fiennes	3:58
3	3	"Fuego"	Tonči Huljić	2:59
4	4	"Strange Paradise"	Magnus Fiennes	4:29
5	5	"Speed"	Stuart Crichton, arr. Stuart 7" mix	3:40
6	6	"Big Love Adagio"	Tomaso Albinoni, arr. Magnus Fiennes/Stuart Crichton/bond	4:58
7	7	"Kashmir"	Robert Plant/Jimmy Page. arr and Produced: The Beatmasters	5:08
8	8	"Gypsy Rhapsody"	Tonči Huljić. arr and Produced: The Beatmasters	3:35
9	9	"Libertango"	Ástor Piazzolla	3:43
10	10	"Sahara"	Haylie Ecker	5:21
11	11	"Ride"	Eos Chater	4:10
12	12	"Space"	Martin Glover/Paul Carter/Amanda Glanfield. arr and Produced:The Beatmasters	4:56
13		"Odyssey"	Tania Davis arr. by Tania Davis and Brian Gascoigne	4:38
14	13	"Bond On Bond"	Monty Norman (adapted from the James Bond Theme), arr. Adapted Wherry	3:03

== Charts ==
Chart (2002)	Peak position
Austrian Albums (Ö3 Austria)	35
French Albums (SNEP)	35
Hungarian Albums (MAHASZ)	6
New Zealand Albums (RMNZ)	24
Swedish Albums (Sverigetopplistan)	58
Swiss Albums (Schweizer Hitparade)	74
UK Albums (OCC)	26
US Billboard 200	61
US Top Classical Albums (Billboard)	1
