= Bond (string quartet) =

Australian/British string quartet

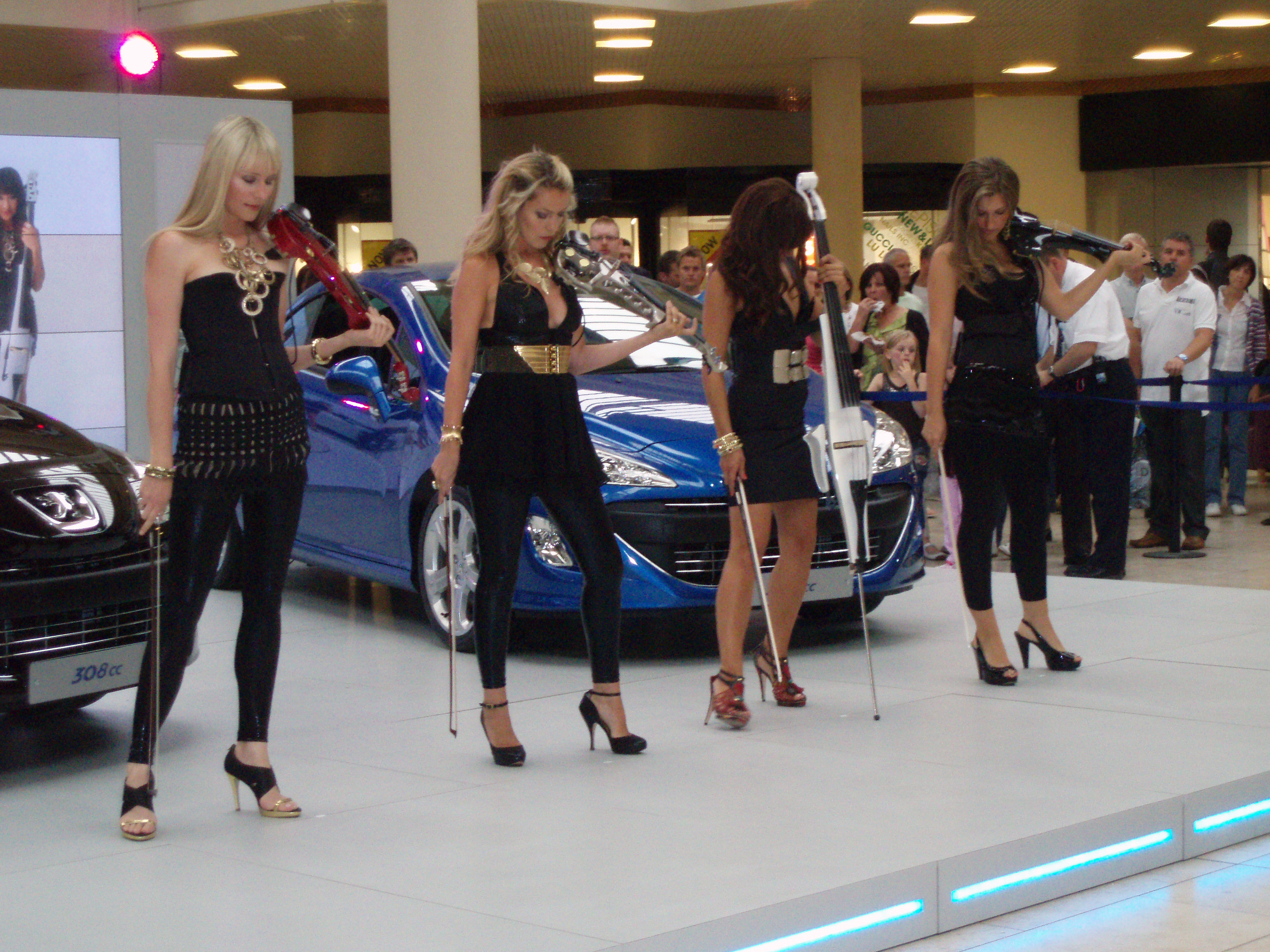
- Bond performing at the Metrocentre, Gateshead in promotion of the Peugeot 308CC

Background information
- Origin: London, United Kingdom
- Genres: Classical crossover; synth-pop; electronica
- Years active: 2000–present
- Labels: MCA; Decca
- Members: Tania Davis; Eos Counsell; Elspeth Hanson; Gay-Yee Westerhoff
- Past members: Haylie Ecker
- Website: bondquartet.com

Bond (stylised as BOND; formerly often typeset as bond in deference to the owners of the 007 trademark) is an Australian/British string quartet that specialises in classical crossover and synth-pop music. The quartet has sold five million albums.

== Creation ==
Bond was formed following initial conversations between Vanessa-Mae composer and record producer Mike Batt and her manager, promoter Mel Bush, after Batt suggested to Bush that the two of them should put together a quartet consisting of "four beautiful, talented musicians" Auditions were held at Baden Powell House in London, and violinist (Eos) and Cellist (Gay Yee) and a viola player were "cast" at that point, using as an audition piece "Contradanza" that Batt had written for Vanessa Mae. It was agreed between them that all was then required was to find the ideal first violinist. Some time later, Bush pushed ahead without Batt, recruiting Batt's former engineer Gareth Cousins. This resulted in an initial four recordings the band made, leading to Bond being signed by Decca. Three of those original recordings, "Duel", "The 1812" and "Dalalai", were the backbone of the first album, Born, with producer Magnus Fiennes providing additional tracks and Mike Batt adding a re-arrangement and remix of "Victory", which became the first single.

The quartet currently consists of Tania Davis (first violin, formerly viola, from Sydney, Australia), Eos Counsell (second violin, from Cardiff, Wales), Elspeth Hanson (viola, from Upper Basildon, England) and Gay-Yee Westerhoff (cello, from Hull, England). Hanson replaced original band member Haylie Ecker (formerly first violin and from Perth, Australia), who left in 2008 to have a child.

=== Genre and success ===
Their début album Born was removed from the UK classical chart, apparently owing to its "sounding too much like pop music". Born later rose to #1 on 21 charts around the world. Shine, their second album, went gold in six countries. Remixed featured remixes from their first two albums as well as three new pieces. Their third studio album Classified went double platinum in Australia, reaching the number one spot on both the classical and pop charts. Explosive: The Best of Bond is a "Best of" that, again, included three unreleased pieces.

== Appearances and recent work ==
The quartet spent much of 2003 touring, particularly throughout Asia, and participating in the Miss Universe 2003 held in Panama City, Panama. They also fitted in performing and filming a TV commercial for American department store chain Marshall Field's and made a commercial in Los Angeles for the Japanese karaoke manufacturer Daiichi Kosho. The group made their movie debut playing themselves in a scene in Rowan Atkinson's James Bond spoof Johnny English for which they also contributed the track "Kismet" (composed by Westerhoff) and played on the Main Theme. They also appeared as themselves in the film XXX: State of the Union, performing "Victory".

The classical violinist André Rieu and the Johann Strauss Orchestra performed live on New Year's Eve in Vienna in a set that includes many Strauss favorites, as well as an appearance from Bond performing "Victory".

In 2009, Peugeot commissioned Bond to record Vivaldi's "Four Seasons" to advertise the 308CC. All four members of the band helped arrange these tracks. The tracks were available for download from Peugeot's website free of charge, with "Summer" and "Winter" also appearing on Bond's album Play.

In a 2009 interview with the Birmingham Mail, Davis revealed that Bond were currently working on their next studio album. She also noted that the next album would have Gypsy, folk, and Eastern European influences. In late 2010 the band started to perform new material from their new album Play at concerts in Mexico, including the new single "Diablo", which was included on the album. It is characterized by an up-tempo beat, and features Bond's own Eos Counsell as vocalist in the song. The string quartet also showcases Jai Ho, a huge hit from the movie Slumdog Millionaire. The album also features a few more recognizable hits, such as the song "Pump It", a version of the Dick Dale and His Del Tones' hit song "Miserlou", featured in the opening credits of Pulp Fiction. The song "Last Time" is an interpretation of the song Bitter Sweet Symphony by the band The Verve. Members of Bond have also written their own tracks on the album. Gay-Yee Westerhoff wrote the song "Beatroot", which is strongly Russian influenced (noticeable by a clarinet improvising over the strings).

According to the band's webpage, the group recorded a medley of Lady Gaga hits at the request of its Japanese label. The Lady Gaga medley was available initially by phone download and was released digitally, soon after, as part of a special Japanese album release.

Bond also performed "I Am the Walrus" alongside Russell Brand at the 2012 Olympics Closing Ceremony. They returned to the Olympic Stadium in London in July 2013 to perform at The National Lottery Anniversary Run event.

A team consisting of the 4 remaining members of Bond, and composer David Arnold (included, according to the BBC, because he has composed music for James Bond movies), competed in and won an episode of Celebrity Eggheads first aired on BBC2 on Thursday 1 June 2017, winning a £20,000 prize for charity as a result.

Bond performed the Australian National Anthem at the Australia versus New Zealand match of the 2013 Rugby Championship in Sydney, 17 August.

Bond performed "Married Life" from Up alongside the Cinematic Sinfonia at the Royal Albert Hall as part of Michael Giacchino At 50: A Birthday Gala Celebration on 20 October 2017.

In October 2024, they played in Hanoi in aid of Typhoon Yagi survivors.

== Personnel ==
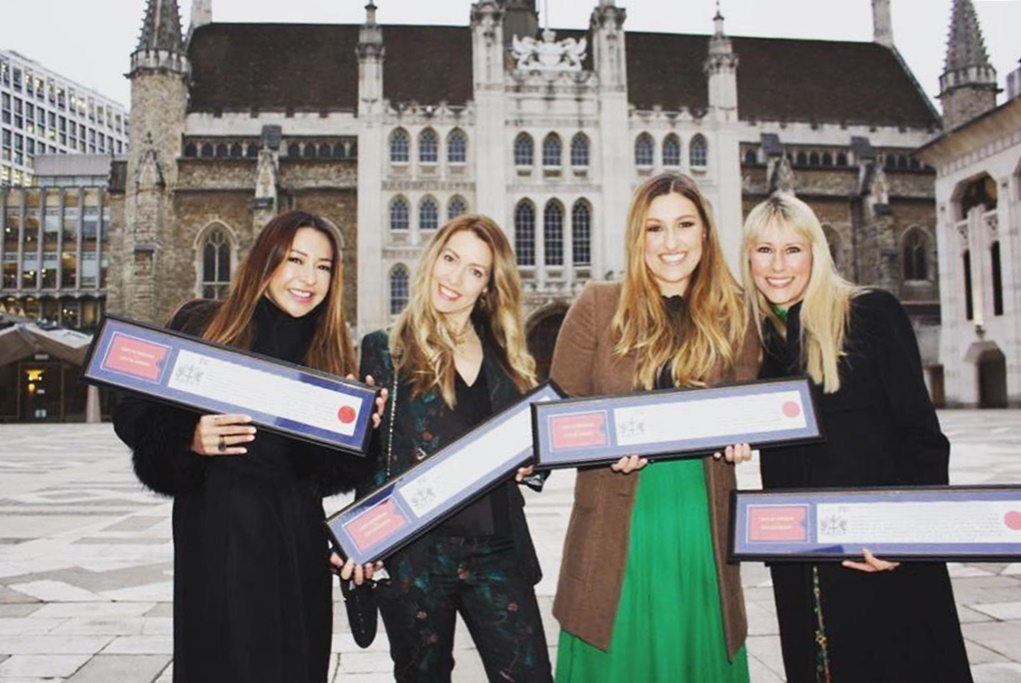
The Bond members in January 2018

=== Current members ===
- Tania Davis – viola (2000–2008), first violin (2008–present)
- Eos Counsell (née Chater) – second violin (2000–present)
- Elspeth Hanson – viola (2008–present)
- Gay-Yee Westerhoff – cello (2000–present)

=== Former members ===
- Haylie Ecker – first violin (2000–2008)

== Discography ==
=== Studio albums ===
- Born (2000)
- Shine (2002)
- Classified (2004)
- Play (2011)

=== Compilations ===
- Remixed (2003)
- Explosive: The Best of Bond (2005)

=== EPs ===
- The Collection (2020)

=== Promotional records ===
- Raymond Weil (2001)
- Fab Field's Mix (2003)

=== Soundtracks ===
- Johnny English

=== Singles ===
- "Victory"
- "Wintersun"
- "Viva!/Wintersun"
- "Shine"
- "Fuego"
- "Speed"
- "Atlanta/Time"
- "Viva!/Victory"
- "Explosive/Adagio for Strings"
- "Fly Robin Fly"
- "I Can't Wait" (2019)
- "Panthera" (2019)
- "Zadok the Priestess" (2020)
- "Come Home" (2020)
- "Artemis" (2020)
- "Alone" (2020)
- "Experience" by Ludovico Einaudi (2021)
- "Cease and Desist" (2021)
- "Rise of the Phoenix" (2022)
- "Me and You" (2023)

=== DVDs ===
- Live at the Royal Albert Hall
- Bond: Video Clip Collection

== Image gallery ==
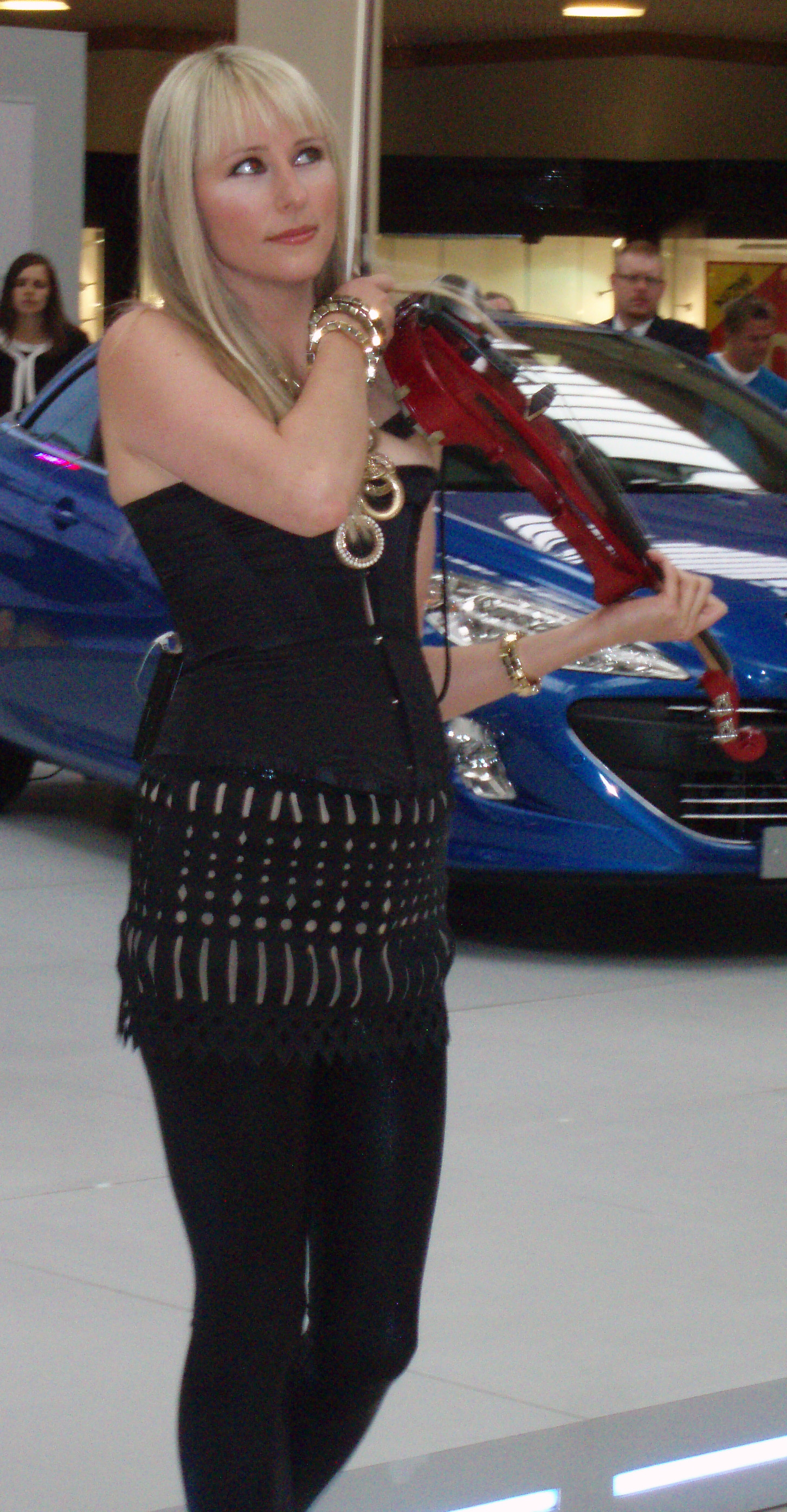
Tania Davis in 2009.

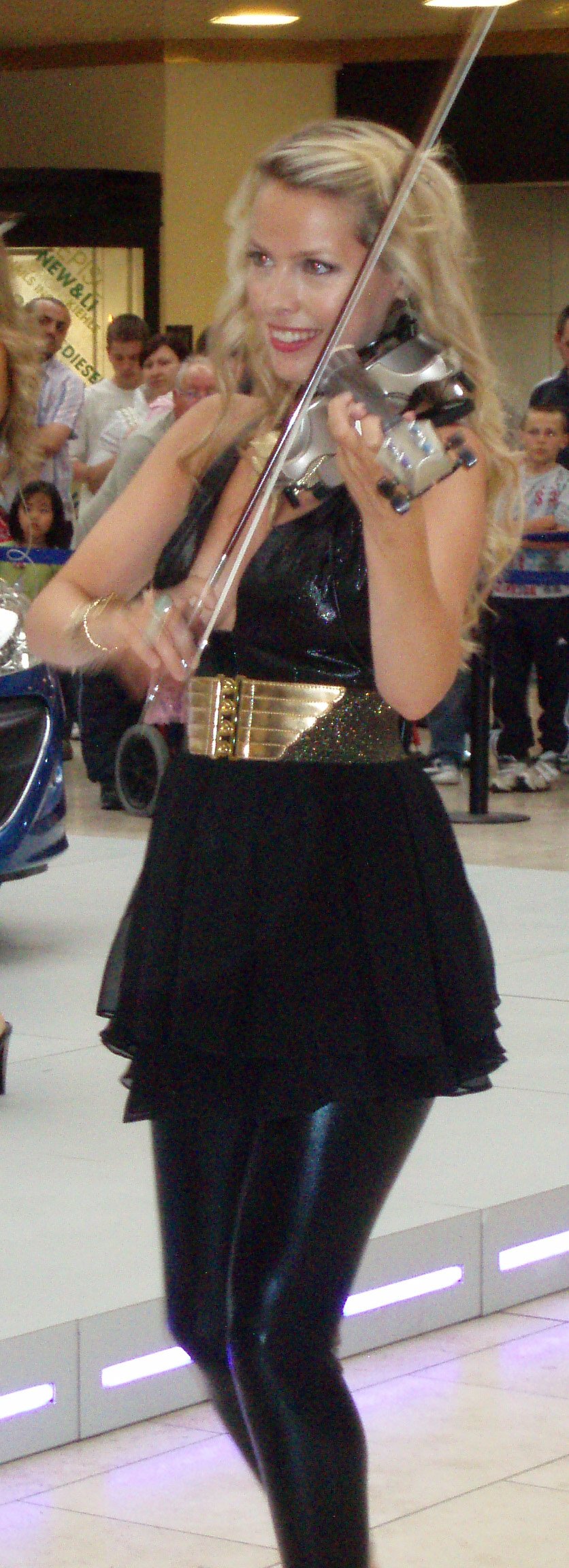
Eos Counsell in 2009.

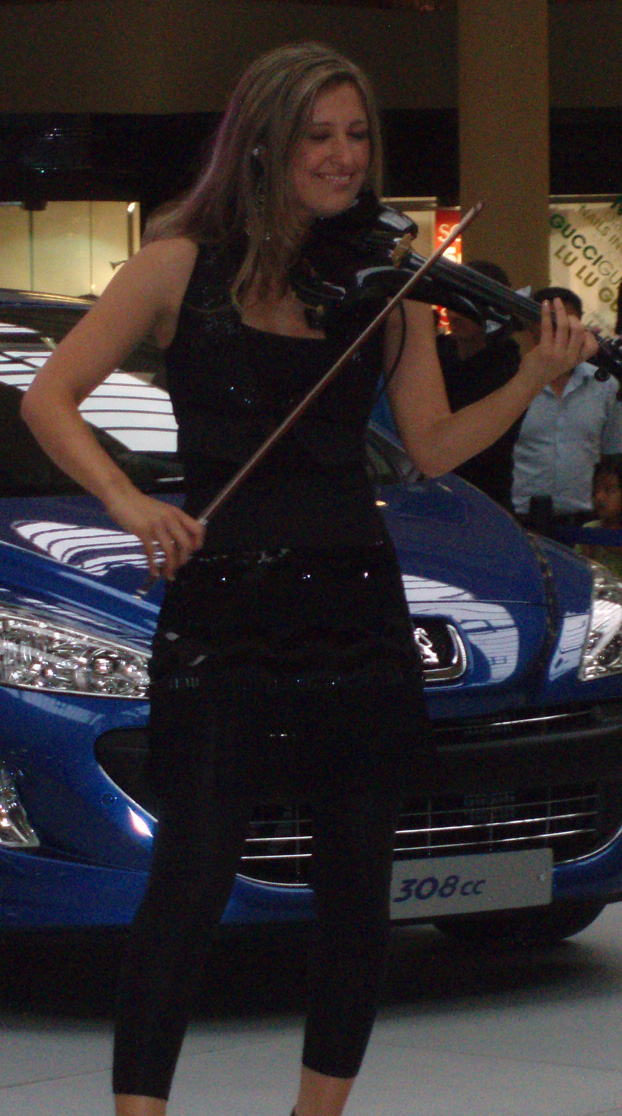
Elspeth Hanson in 2009.

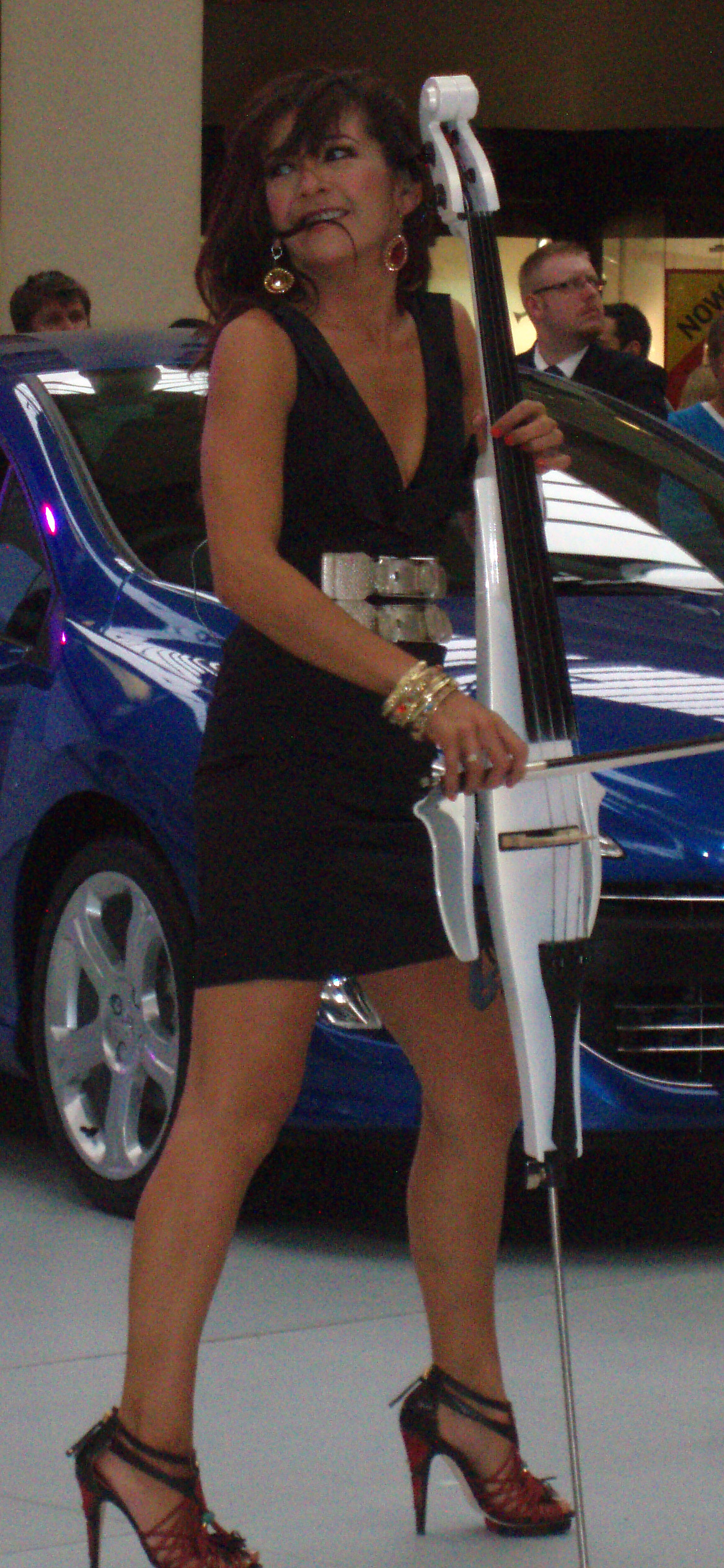
Gay-Yee Westerhoff in 2009.
