= John McKenzie (musician) =

British musical artist (1955–2020)

- Born: John Michael McKenzie; 10 November 1955; Paddington, London, England
- Died: 10 May 2020 (aged 64)
- Occupations: Musician, songwriter
- Instruments: Bass guitar, fretless bass, guitar, backing vocals
- Years active: 1970 – 2020
- Labels: MCA, Columbia, RCA, Warner Music Vision, EMI Records

John Michael McKenzie (10 November 1955 – 10 May 2020) was a British bass guitarist who was a member of bands such as Global Village Trucking Company and Man. He played on numerous singles, notably for Eurythmics, The Pretenders and Alison Moyet; and was a touring musician with acts as diverse as Lionel Richie, Dr. John and the Royal Philharmonic Orchestra.

== Career ==
McKenzie started his career in 1970 as a member of the Global Village Trucking Company, who all lived together in an old farm house in Sotherton, Suffolk, with their families, and became a well-known live act by playing extended jams at numerous benefit concerts and free festivals. Their first recording was as part of Greasy Truckers Live at Dingwalls Dance Hall, a benefit album recorded at Dingwalls and released in 1973. The same year, the BBC made and broadcast a documentary about the band, their commune, and their shunning of record companies. In 2008 the BBC made a follow-up documentary for their What Happened Next series, which included the band performing a reunion gig, their first in over 30 years, which led to Global Village gigs at Glastonbury 2008 and other festivals. In 1975 they recorded an eponymous album, but broke up shortly afterwards.

McKenzie came to prominence as the bass player of the rock band Man, which he joined in 1975, having auditioned for the role. He recorded The Welsh Connection for which he also wrote one track, and which reached No 40 in the UK Album Chart. During a US tour to promote the album, including performances with John Cipollina, in July/August 1976, differences between the band members arose, and on the next European tour McKenzie and Phil Ryan announced they would be leaving. However, they remained together for a farewell tour, on which a live album, All's Well That Ends Well, was recorded at the Roundhouse in December 1976.

He then played on records of artists like Annette Peacock, Steve Hillage and Noel McCalla.

The 1980s saw him playing on records by Bob Young, Shusha Guppy, Wham!, Deke Leonard, Morrissey-Mullen, Claire Hamill, Space Monkey, Jim Diamond, Bob Dylan, Al Corley, The Pretenders, Jeffrey Lee Pierce, Microdisney, Five Star, Endgames (with Mel Gaynor), Atomic Rooster's John Mizarolli. He played on three Eurythmics hit singles "Thorn in My Side", "When Tomorrow Comes" and "The Miracle of Love". He also was featured on the soundtrack of the movie La Boum 2 and on albums including Gary Moore, Ian Paice, Jaki Graham, Don Airey, Richard Bailey, Peter Auty, Billy Bremner, Terry Stannard, Simon Kirke, Earl Slick, Graham Lyle and Chris Thompson. He also produced singles along with Candy McKenzie and Mel Gaynor. In 1984, he produced the LP Spell It Out, songs recorded by his father Mike McKenzie, and mother, the actress Elizabeth McKenzie.

In 1990, he played on The Pretenders' hit single "Hold a Candle to This", Alison Moyet's "It Won't Be Long" (and the album Hoodoo) and played on records by Patti Austin, Latin Quarter, Roxy Music's Phil Manzanera, Moyet's Essex, Matt Bianco, Pete Brown, Helen Watson and Kevin Rowland which later led to McKenzie playing for Dexys Midnight Runners. He also played on the UK hit single "You Better Believe It" by Sid Owen and Patsy Palmer for Children in Need.

McKenzie also produced the record Rattlesnake Guitar: The Music of Peter Green featuring Ian Anderson, Arthur Brown, Rory Gallagher, Gregg Bissonette, Stuart Hamm, Luther Grosvenor, Dick Heckstall-Smith, Ken Hensley, Max Middleton, Zoot Money, Billy Sheehan, Bob Tench, Snowy White, Roy Z, John "Rabbit" Bundrick, Savoy Brown and many more. His 1991 performance with Seal was released on DVD, entitled Live at the Point, in 2004. In 2005 he was featured on Roots Manuva's "The Falling". He also played on records by Bond, Antigone Foster, Jim Diamond, Kokomo, Paddy Casey, Louis Philippe, Wet Wet Wet's Marti Pellow and on East 17's UK hit single "Secret of My Life" in 2011.

He toured the world as a musician for Lionel Richie, Shakira, David Bowie, Tina Turner, Eric Burdon, Kajagoogoo, Dr. John, Johnny Mathis, Everything But The Girl, Todd Sharpville, Branford Marsalis, Rui Veloso, Tim Finn, Ive Mendes, Tom Scott, David Dundas, Danny Tenaglia, The Christians, Phenix Horns, Duran Duran's Andy Taylor, Jimmy Iovine, Dave Stewart, Wild, Leon Ware, Eternal, James Ingram, Francis Rossi, Soft Machine's Karl Jenkins, Albert Lee, Barbara Dickson, Davy Spillane, Charles Aznavour, Raw Stylus, Linda Taylor, Blair Cunningham, Andy Newmark, Teresa Teng, Annabel Lamb, Nadirah X, Bob Clearmountain, Mitchell Froom, Arthur Louis, as well as Royal Philharmonic Orchestra and Reggae Philharmonic Orchestra.

In 2012, he toured with Dexys Midnight Runners including an appearance on Later with Jools Holland. In December 2013 McKenzie toured with classical crossover pianist Maksim Mrvica.

He died on 10 May 2020.

== Discography ==
- 1973 – Global Village Trucking Company – Greasy Truckers Live at Dingwalls Dance Hall
- 1976 – Global Village Trucking Company – Global Village Trucking Company
- 1976 – Man – The Welsh Connection
- 1977 – Man – All's Well That Ends Well
- 1978 – Iona – Cuckoo
- 1979 – Annette Peacock – The Perfect Release
- 1979 – Philip Rambow – Shooting Gallery
- 1979 – Oxendale and Shepard – Put Your Money Where Your Mouth Is
- 1979 – Steve Hillage – Open
- 1979 – Noel McCalla – Night Time Emotion
- 1979 – Steve Hillage – Live Herald
- 1980 – Bob Young – In Quo Country
- 1980 – Shusha – Here I Love You
- 1981 – Deke Leonard – Before Your Very Eyes
- 1982 – John Mizarolli – Message from the 5th Stone
- 1982 – Morrissey–Mullen – Life on the Wire
- 1983 – Royal Philharmonic Orchestra – Arrested
- 1983 – Chris Thompson – Out of the Night
- 1983 – Wham! – Fantastic
- 1983 – Paul Brady – True For You
- 1984 – Claire Hamill – Touch Paper
- 1984 – Microdisney – Everybody Is Fantastic
- 1985 – Five Star – Luxury of Life
- 1985 – Jim Diamond – Double Crossed
- 1985 – Jeffrey Lee Pierce – Wildweed
- 1985 – Endgames – Natural
- 1985 – Space Monkey – On The Beam
- 1986 – Eurythmics – Revenge
- 1986 – Bob Dylan – Knocked Out Loaded
- 1986 – Al Corley – Riot of Colour
- 1986 – Jim Diamond – Desire For Freedom
- 1986 – The Pretenders – Get Close
- 1986 – Wham! – Music from the Edge of Heaven
- 1987 – Pulling Faces – Dance of Ghosts
- 1989 – Tyrone Berkeley – To Touch You
- 1989 – Phil Manzanera – Manzanera & McKay
- 1990 – Mary Coughlan – Uncertain Pleasures
- 1990 – The Pretenders – Packed!
- 1991 – Alison Moyet – Hoodoo
- 1991 – Steve Hillage – Ggggong-Go_Long
- 1992 – Helen Watson – Companion Gal
- 1992 – Faubert – Faubert
- 1993 – Latin Quarter – Long Pig
- 1994 – Patti Austin – That Secret Place
- 1994 – Alison Moyet – Essex
- 1995 – Matt Bianco – Gran Via
- 1996 – Pete Brown – The Land That Cream Forgot
- 1997 – Latin Quarter – Bringing Rosa Home
- 1999 – Darkstar – Heart of Darkness
- 1999 – Kevin Rowland – My Beauty
- 2000 - David French – All the difference
- 2001 – Jim Diamond – Jim Diamond
- 2002 – Bond – Shine
- 2002 – Adam Snyder – Across The Pond
- 2002 – Pete Brown & Phil Ryan – Ardours of the Lost Rake
- 2003 – Louis Philippe – My Favorite Part of You
- 2003 – Everything but the Girl – Like the Deserts Miss the Rain
- 2004 – Kokomo – To Be Cool
- 2004 – Paddy Casey – Living
- 2005 – Danny Seward – Where My Heart Is
- 2005 – Marti Pellow – Smile
- 2005 – Roots Manuva – Awfully Deep
- 2007 – Virginia Constantine – The Bumpy Road To Love
- 2008 – The Explorers – Live at the Palace
- 2009 – Antigone – AntigoneLand
- 2010 – Pete Brown – Road of Cobras
- 2010 – Cold River Lady – Better Late Than Never
- 2012 – Amandine Bourgeois – Sans Amour Mon Amour

=== Compilation albums ===
- 1994 – Steve Hillage – BBC Radio 1 Live
- 1995 – Phil Manzanera – Manzanera Collection
- 1999 – Man – Rare Man
- 2004 – Steve Hillage – Live at Deeply Vale Festival '78
- 2005 – Eurythmics – Boxed
- 2005 – Man – Live at the Keystone, Berkeley, 9 August 1976
- 2006 – The Pretenders – Pirate Radio
- 2008 – The Gun Club – The Life & Times of Jeffrey Lee Pierce & The Gun Club
- 2013 – Man – Many Man Are Called
- 2013 – Bob Dylan – The Complete Audio Collection Vol. 1

=== Others ===
- 1982 – La Boum 2
- 1995 – Rattlesnake Guitar: The Music of Peter Green
- 2000 – Peter Green Songbook
- 2001 – Arabesque Zoudge

=== DVDs ===
- 2001 – Bond – Live at the Royal Albert Hall
- 2003 – Everything but the Girl – Like the Deserts Miss the Rain
- 2003 – David Bowie – Inside Bowie & The Spiders
- 2004 – Seal – Live at the Point
- 2007 – Steve Hillage – Live in England 1979
