= Cold River Lady =

English rock band

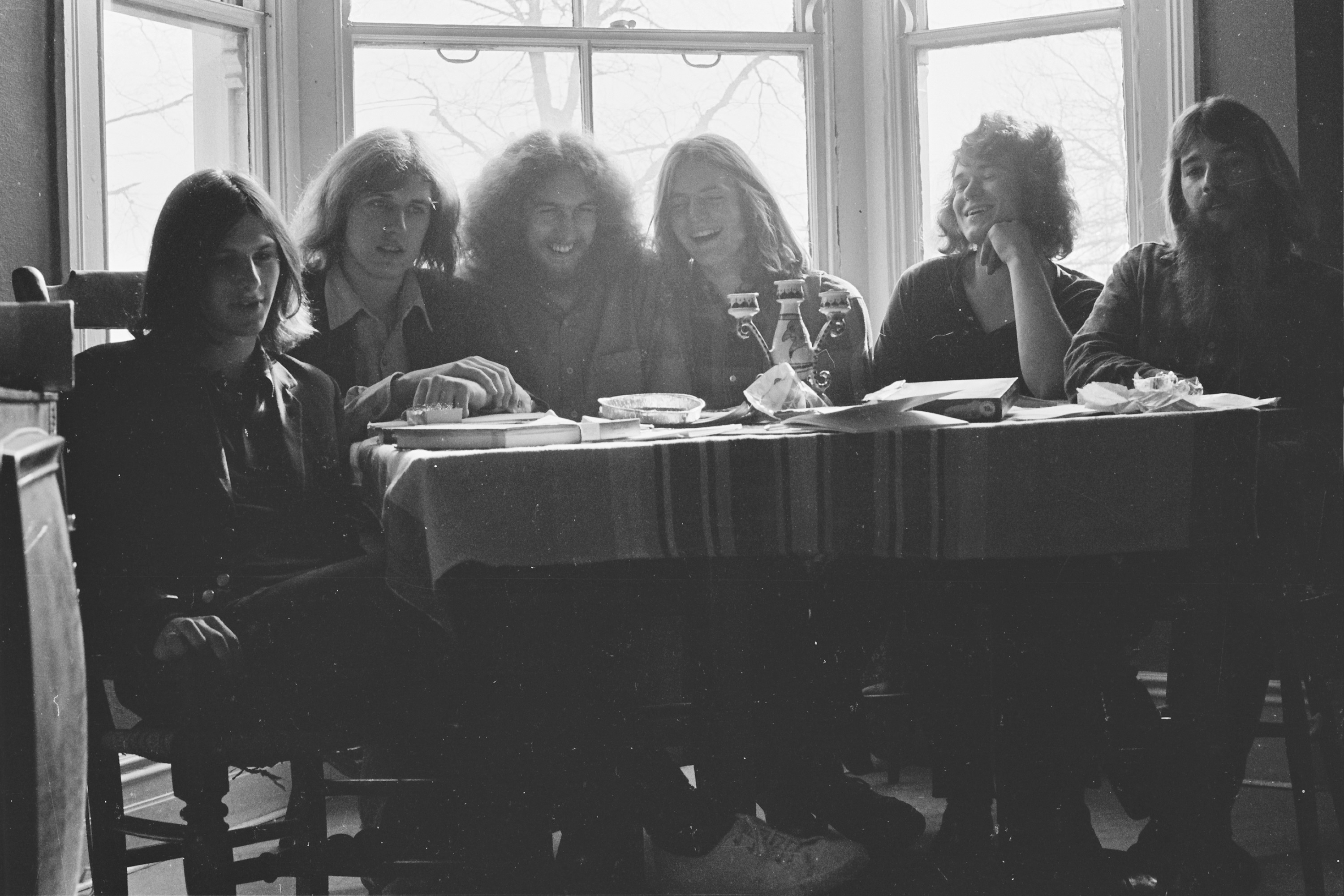
- Original band lineup, London, March 1973 (left to right) Phil Weaver, Mike Lawley, Paul Cheshire, Paul Griffiths, Will Wright, Pedro Brown

Background information
- Origin: Hereford, England
- Genres: Rock
- Years active: 1970–1992
- Label: Angel Air
- Past members: Will Wright; Phil Weaver; Pedro Brown; Mike Lawley; Paul Griffiths; Paul Cheshire; Helen Hardy; Pete Farndon; Tic Taylor; John Clarke; John McKenzie; Bob Jenkins

Cold River Lady ("CRL") was a rock band that was formed in 1970 in Hereford in the Welsh Marches of England. Their music however drew on far wider influences. With its eclectic mix of acoustic guitar, lazy rural rhythms and a sharp electric edge and strong melodies and lyrics, it combined rock, folk and blues influences, with sophisticated flavours from the likes of Arthur Lee, Tim Buckley and Caravan. The music of the band developed with the various changes of personnel and evolving musical times, whilst keeping its unique "Hereford" feel, until it finally wound up in 1976 when the punk era took a grip. The final twist in the life of this band was that forty years after it was formed its first album Better Late Than Never was released in 2010.

== History ==
=== Formation ===
CRL was formed initially by Phil Weaver, Will Wright and Mike Lawley, when they were all together at Hereford Cathedral School in 1970. Will and Mike had also been in the same primary school (Tupsley VA School). Phil had played in one band previously called Carcass on rhythm guitar, with brothers Kevin Williams (vocals) and Ian "Ernie" Williams (lead guitar), Pete Farndon (bass) (much later of The Pretenders) and Paul "Jazz" Jones (drums), playing mostly covers of contemporary rock bands. Kevin, Ian and Pete were all also at the Cathedral School. After this band Phil started writing original material on 12 string acoustic and his infamous "cocklecaster guitar" with Will playing a variety of recorders. Mike had been persuaded to take up bass and started to contribute lyrics to complement Phil's strong melody lines. The first rehearsals were carried out at their homes. With two final recruits being made from the thriving and hip Hereford scene of the early 70's, Paul "Griff" Griffiths (6 string acoustic) and Pedro Brown (Drums and percussion), the line up started formal rehearsing.

Rehearsals took place at the local YMCA on Aylestone Hill where there happened to be an old harmonium lying around. Will, as the only one having had a few brief piano lessons incorporated this into the band, amplifying it with a microphone fed through a wah-wah peddle, and also commenced providing material writing on piano. Pedro had played in a few local bands and was the most experienced musician amongst the band at that time. Early influences on the song writing side were US West Coast bands such as Arthur Lee and Love, Tim Buckley and Spirit, and from England, Caravan and folk music generally. The style of music also reflected the rural environment and would possibly fall into the "folk rock" genre. The name Cold River Lady was taken from a poem by Paul "Jazz" Jones the drummer from Carcass.

The first gig took place at Brown's Club of Clubs, a converted cinema in Knighton on the Welsh border in spring 1971 supporting Pete Brown and Piblokto! and local Hereford band Sam Gamgee. Pete Brown, (who was a poet and had written many of the lyrics for Cream with Jack Bruce) and Phil Ryan (Pete's then organist and song writing partner, later of Welsh band Man) both enjoyed CRL's set with Pete volunteering to help in bringing the band to the notice of record companies. The band at that stage was in a loose form and Phil, Will and Mike all went off to University, only all to give up within the year with a view to taking the band more seriously.

1972 was the start of the main song writing period of the band based on the core output from Phil and Mike. Will had kept in contact with Pete Brown who wanted little excuse to leave London for the odd weekend in Hereford. Pete persuaded Polydor Records to make the first demos of the band with Pete producing. Four songs were recorded of which, from this session, "Far in the Fields" and "Sauna Bath Blues" are included on the 2010 release Better Late than Never. Also present on this session was Paul "Chesh" Cheshire (from the band Sam Gamgee) who added some electric guitar on three of the songs. Paul had been in Hunderton primary school with Griff and had recommended Griff for the band to Phil Will and Mike. Sam Gamgee was Chesh (guitar & vocals), Kelvin Wilson (bass & vocals), Tic Taylor (drums) and Ian "Ernie" Williams (guitar) (former member of Carcass). Chesh, Kelvin and Tic had all previously been members of the young schoolboy band, The Phantoms, who had made winning TV appearances at the age of 12 on Stubby Kaye’s Silver Star Show (ATVs ‘60s equivalent of Opportunity Knocks / X-Factor) as well as gigging regularly on the local village hall circuit - a circuit also frequented by the Silence and Doc Thomas Band who were later to mutate into Mott the Hoople.

=== 1973-1974 ===
After Ian "Ernie" Williams left Sam Gamgee, Chesh, Kelvin and Tic joined forces with the remnants of Karakorum (a well-respected Hereford progressive rock band), James Williams (guitar & vocals), Richard Edwards (guitar) and Martin Chambers (drums) (later of the Pretenders) to form Karakorum Mk III, which lasted only briefly. Chesh then joined up with CRL as lead guitarist and vocalist as well as becoming the third songwriter in the band, while Martin and Kelvin hooked up with Verden Allen, Mott The Hoople's recently departed organist, to form Cheeks, the line up of which was completed by James Honeyman-Scott (also later of The Pretenders).

During this period CRL played gigs locally and increasingly worked further a field in the Midlands and occasionally London. The regular rehearsal venue was Will and Mike's old school at Tupsley where the headmaster Wally Davies, whose house was on the school site, stoically put up with highly amplified music three nights a week. CRL with the six piece line up, then recorded more demos at Pathway Studios in London. From these four songs, Soft Spot Rest and Something are included on Better Late than Never.

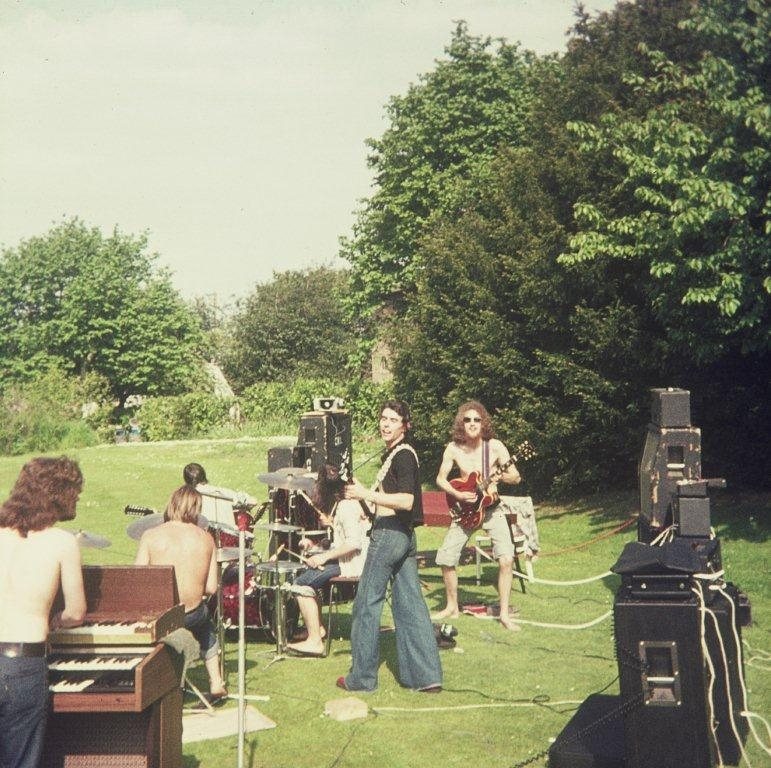
Band Lineup, Hereford, May 1974 (left to right) Will Wright, Pedro Brown, Phil Weaver, Tic Taylor, Pete Farndon, Paul Cheshire

Helen Hardy also provided backing vocals on the Pathway sessions. Helen had moved from Dorset to Hereford in 1972 and started singing with another local band, Helen Heavens, also featuring Chesh on lead guitar. CRL by then used the same rehearsal space in Hereford - Norman Rose's Bridge Street Studios. Despite interest from various record companies CRL remained unsigned. Their most notable gig of this period was the Windsor Free Festival where Pete Farndon roadied and the CRL set on the main stage was played to the accompaniment of police helicopters buzzing the running skirmishes between the police and the hippies.

=== 1974-1976 ===
In the summer of 1974 Mike and Griff after some soul searching left CRL to go to Reading University and Sussex University respectively, although Mike continued to contribute lyrics for Phil's melodies for the next few years. The obvious choice for replacement bass player was Pete Farndon who, after playing with Phil in Carcass and hanging out on the London and Hereford scene, had been inspired to take up playing bass again after seeing both Thin Lizzy and the Sensational Alex Harvey Band at Malvern Winter Gardens. Consequently, his choice of bass was a Rickenbacker. Pete was playing in a band with Tic and Chesh and also joined forces with Chesh, Geoff Townsend and Mark Anderson in a band called the Dingos (Chesh's services in Hereford as a lead guitarist frequently being in demand). So logic suggested taking both Pete and Tic into CRL to beef up the sound with two drummers and turn CRL into a more electric rock band. The final recruit into this line-up was Helen who was prised away from Helen Heavens.

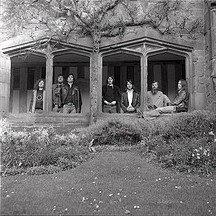
Band Lineup, Hereford Cathedral Cloisters, 1974 (left to right) Will Wright, Paul Cheshire, Pete Farndon, Phil Weaver, Tic Taylor, Pedro Brown, Helen Hardy

Pete Brown had been acting as a part-time manager for the band but was glad to hand over this role to the redoubtable Duncan Ferguson, who ran the Greyhound in Fulham, a famed music venue of the time, where Pete had got the band a residency. Duncan finally turned them professional and sent them off to Europe. This the most active line up of the band in terms of gigging and with the first professional management allowing the band to turn pro. Many one nighters throughout England and Wales followed as well as tours of the Netherlands and Germany. Most weeks found the band playing in London at one of the many gigs which still existed in this era such as the Marquee, Dingwalls and the Greyhound and positive reviews appeared in the music press. This line up recorded both the Travellers and Routing in the Quagmire as a single at Dennis Weinreich's studio, Scorpio Sound, but still, despite getting very close to a record deal especially with Island Records, nothing was released.

=== 1976 ===
By early 1976 CRL was running out of steam and Phil decided that life on the road was not really his favourite occupation, preferring just to write songs for the band. Pedro and Tic also left. Chesh, Pete, Will and Helen decided to give it one more go using John Clarke from Kirkaldy in Scotland whom Pete Brown suggested to CRL. There was a real feeling of renewed energy initially but after rehearsals, a couple of new songs, a couple of gigs and failed new management auditions, there was a general consensus that the band had run its course and it was time to call it a day in 1976.

== 1992 studio recording & 2010 release ==
This could have been the end of CRL except that Pete Brown still had faith and a fondness for the CRL songs and in 1992 suggested he would like to finance and make an album with Phil, Will Chesh and Helen. The rhythm section used for this recording John MacKenzie, one of the UKʼs top session bassists who had become a good friend of both Helen and Will (as well as having worked with Pete Brown many times) and Bob Jenkins (also a top UK drummer) who was a friend of Helenʼs as well as a regular session partner of Johnʼs. The rhythm tracks were recorded in Stoke-on-Trent, with over-dubs at Pete Kerrʼs studio in east London and mixed in Stoke by Pete Kerr, Pete Brown and Will Wright. Pete Brown produced the album and Pete Kerr engineered.

The music business being what it is, 1992 was still the wrong time for the release of the album and nobody wanted to know. Then in 2009 Pete Brown still with the tapes of the 1992 session met Peter Purnell of Angel Air records and told him about the record. Pete Purnell loved it and came on board to release in August 2010 the CRL album Better Late Than Never.

== After breakup ==
After CRL Chesh, Phil, Pedro and Tic all remained living in or around Hereford. Chesh and Phil continued to write together and played in two bands along with Pedro - The Banque with Richie Downes on bass, and Friends featuring Paul Cobbold (bass) (who was also at the Cathedral School and went on to be a noted recording engineer and producer at Rockfield Studios) and James Williams (guitar, piano and vocals), both ex Karakorum, plus Mark Thompson of Buzz Music (sax). Chesh and Pedro worked together in several other bands including Manyana and The John Shane Band. Chesh also played with a band called Red Sails including the talented young drummer Clive Jenner who later became drummer with Groove Armada and The Proclaimers. Chesh continues to play regularly and ply his craft in many bands as well as writing songs and doing sessions. Phil, in addition to the Banque and Friends also formed a duo called Double Trouble with Richie Downes and then followed that with another duo 'The Meanies' with Ian Clifford (guitar and vocals, and ex-Cluster and Alvin Stardust drummer). For the past ten years Phil has gigged regularly as a solo artist and continues to write and record.

Pedro Brown continues to work full-time as a percussionist, and play drums with many bands. He has also released three solo albums featuring his saxophone playing as well as his drumming - Windswept, Long Journey and Out of the Storm. Pedro is also an accomplished photographer who has had several exhibitions. Tic Taylor went on to play drums in several bands including Love Manoeuvres and The Cruise.

Will moved to London in 1976 and after some years as a full-time player, eventually used the financial side of his skills to become a successful banker. He gigged regularly in London with various bands till the late 1990s, including Lee Fardon's Legionnaires, Cheap Perfume, and providing the material for an instrumental band including brothers, bassist Steve Lewinson and drummer Pete Lewinson who went on to form Simply Red's rhythm section as well as being much in demand session players. Will now lives in Italy.

On leaving CRL Helen became professional and joined Pete Brown's Back to the Front between 1976 and 1977 and then Roger Chapman's Shortlist, with whom she continues to work. She has also toured the UK, Japan and Australia with Gilbert O'Sullivan. She has also worked with the Arthur Louis band (along with John McKenzie and Blair Cunningham) providing backing vocals with Noel McCalla and also sings on Pete Brown and Phil Ryan's new album due for release in 2010 as well as doing regular session work.

Pete Farndon joined Bushwackers, an Australian country music band, while they were in London and followed them back to Australia for a year then joined up with the first line up of the Pretenders with Chrissie Hynde and Tom Edwards on drums (another Hereford Cathedral School friend). Pete was then instrumental in persuading James Honeyman-Scott and Martin Chambers to join the Pretenders. Pete attained considerable success with The Pretenders before his tragically premature death in April 1983.

Paul Griffiths and Mike Lawley maintain an active interest in music but ceased performing in bands after CRL. Paul lives in Neath and is a talented watercolourist and painter. Mike lives in Cardiff.

== Personnel ==
- Will Wright - descant, treble & tenor recorders, organ, harmonium, piano, electric piano, synthesiser (1971–1976, 1992)
- Phil Weaver - vocals, 12 string acoustic/electric guitar & cocklecaster (1971–1976, 1992)
- Pedro Brown - drums, percussion (1971–1976)
- Mike Lawley - bass (1971–1974)
- Paul Griffiths - 6 string acoustic guitar, backing vocals (1971–1974)
- Paul Cheshire - lead guitar, electric piano, vocals (1973–1976, 1992)
- Helen Hardy vocals (1974–1976, 1992)
- Pete Farndon - bass (1974–1976; died 1983)
- Tic Taylor - drums (1974–1976)
- John Clarke - drums (1976)
- John McKenzie - bass (1992)
- Bob Jenkins - drums (1992)

== Discography ==
- Better Late Than Never (2010) (CD, Angel Air)
