= Under the Influence (Mary Coughlan album) =

Studio album by Mary Coughlan
- Released: 1987
- Studio: Lansdowne Studios, Dublin, Ireland
- Length: 49:46
- Label: Warner Music
- Producer: Eric Visser

Mary Coughlan chronology
Tired and Emotional (1985)	Under the Influence (1987)	Uncertain Pleasures (1990)

Under the Influence is the second album by Irish singer Mary Coughlan. It was first released in 1987 by Warner Music (at the time called WEA).

== Reception ==
The album received a 4 and a half star rating on AllMusic. The single "Ride On" reached number 5 on the Irish Pop Charts in 1987.

== Track listing ==
1. "Laziest Girl" (Cole Porter)
2. "Ice Cream Man" (Johnny Mulhern)
3. "Ice Cream Van" (D. Murphey)
4. "Parade of Clowns" (R. Crispijn, H. Van Veen, E. Van Der Wurff)
5. "My Land Is Too Green" (Antoinette Hensey, Erik Visser)
6. "Ride On" (Jimmy MacCarthy)
7. "Good Morning Heartache" (Ervin Drake, Dan Fisher, Irene Higginbotham)
8. "Fifteen Only" (Wedekind Dress)
9. "AWOL" (H. Visser, L. Geuens, Antoinette Hensey)
10. "The Dice" (Antoinette Hensey, Erik Visser)
11. "Don't Smoke in Bed" (Willard Robison)
12. "Blue Surrender" (D. Long)
13. "Sunday Mornings" (Molly McAnally Burke)
14. "Coda" (Antoinette Hensey, Erik Visser)

== Personnel ==
- Mary Coughlan - vocals
- Connor Barry - acoustic guitar, electric guitar
- Jerome Rimson - bass
- Robbie Brennan - drums
- Noel Eccles - percussion
- Raoul Eurlings - piano on "My Land Is Too Green"
- Trevor Knight - piano, synthesizer
- Davy Spillane - Uilleann pipes
- Theo van Tol - accordion
- Richie Buckley - tenor and soprano saxophone
- Helen Walsh, Rita Connolly, Valerie Armstrong - backing vocals
- Arthur De Groodt - cello
- Pleun Van Der Linden, Sylvia Houtzager - violin
- Coen Van Der Heide - viola
- André Vulperhorst - tuba
- Peter Williams, Erik Visser - Fairlight programming
