= Better Late Than Never =

Better Late Than Never may refer to:

== Film and television ==
- Better Late Than Never, a 1922 film starring Sid Smith
- Better Late Than Never (1979 film), an American TV film directed by Richard Crenna
- Better Late Than Never (1983 film), a British comedy film directed by Bryan Forbes
- Better Late Than Never (TV series), a 2016–2018 American travel-reality show
- "Better Late Than Never" (Thomas & Friends), a 1986 TV episode

== Music ==
=== Albums ===
- Better Late Than Never (Romeo Santos and Prince Royce album), 2025
- Better Late Than Never (Anderson Ponty Band album), 2015
- Better Late Than Never (Cold River Lady album), 2010
- Better Late Than Never (Eddie and the Hot Rods album), 2004
- Better Late Than Never (The Slackers album), 1996
- Better Late Than Never (Trife Diesel album) or the title song, 2009
- Better Late Than Never, by Bobby Breen, or the title song, 1964
- Better Late Than Never, by Craig Goldy, 1995
- Better Late Than Never, by Gil Coggins, 2003
- Better Late Than Never!, by the Greenbriar Boys, 1966
- Better Late Than Never, by Lange, 2007
- Better Late Than Never, by Rosie, 1976
- Better Late Than Never, by Yung L, 2017
- Better Late Than Never: In Memory of Paul C, by Mikey D and LA Posse, 2006

=== Songs ===
- "Better Late Than Never", by CeeLo Green from Heart Blanche, 2015
- "Better Late Than Never", by FM, 2013
- "Better Late Than Never", by the Nolans from Making Waves, 1980
- "Better Late Than Never", by Tanya Tucker from Tear Me Apart, 1979

== Other uses ==
- Better Late Than Never: From Barrow Boy to Ballroom, a 2008 book by Len Goodman with Richard Havers
- "Better Late Than Never", a 1986 Thomas the Tank Engine story from More About Thomas the Tank Engine
- Better Late Than Never, a 2022–2025 stand-up comedy tour by Peter Kay

== See also ==
- Procrastination
