= Promiscuity (disambiguation) =

Promiscuity may refer to:

- Promiscuity, the practice of making relatively casual and indiscriminate choices, most commonly applied to sexual behaviour and referred to as Sexual promiscuity
- "Promiscuity," a song by Samuel Barber, from his 1953 song cycle Hermit Songs
- "Promiscuity," a song by Manu Chao from his 2000 album Próxima Estación: Esperanza
- "Promiscuity," a song by Antigone from her 2009 debut album AntigoneLand

== See also ==
- Promiscuous mode
