= Live in Galway =

Live album by Mary Coughlan
- Released: 1996
- Recorded: 1995
- Venue: Roisin Dubh, Galway, Ireland
- Length: 60:44
- Label: Avex Trax
- Producer: Erik Visser

Mary Coughlan chronology
Love for Sale (1992)	Live in Galway (1996)	After the Fall (1997)

Live in Galway is a live album by Irish singer Mary Coughlan that was released in 1996.

== Track listing ==
1. "The Laziest Gal in Town" (Cole Porter) – 3:10
2. "The Beach" (Erik Visser, A. Hensey) – 3:37
3. "Hearts" (Jacques Brel) – 3:14
4. "Country Fair Dance" (Gerry O'Beirne) – 3:44
5. "I Want to Be Seduced" (Gary Tigerman, Graceland McCollough Tigers) – 2:56
6. "Ancient Rain" (J. McCarthy) – 7:01
7. "Sweet Victim" (J. McCarthy) – 4:40
8. "Not up to Scratch" (de Groot, Nijgh) – 4:29
9. "Just a Friend" (Lambrecht, Schoovaerts, Schoufs) – 3:28
10. "Blue Surrender" (D. Long) – 4:30
11. "Magdalen Laundry" (Johnny Mulhern) – 6:47
12. "My Land Is Too Green" (Erik Visser, A. Hensey) – 3:53
13. "Delaney" (Johnny Mulhern) – 4:28
14. "Nobody's Business (Tango)" (Porter Grainger, Everett Robbins) – 4:47
