= Justin Shave =

Australian music producer

Shave
- Born: Justin George Shave; Sydney, New South Wales, Australia
- Known for: Music Producing and Sonic Technology

Justin Shave, better known as Shave, is an Australian music producer/composer and sonic technologist. He also works across the TV, record and advertising industries.

Shave has a degree in music, computing science | pure mathematics from the University of Sydney. He has performed around the world from Wembley to Moscow, consulted for music tech companies like Native Instruments [Berlin], Fairlight Instruments [Australia] and developed my own software synthesizers.

Shave's initial foray into production was as one half of Sydney's [love] Tattoo, penning Fat Boy Slim favourite Drop Some Drums and ARIA-nominated club classic The Bass has Got Me Movin’. He then went on to form pop dance act Etherfox, releasing Latin house anthem "The Whirled You Live" through Ministry of Sound, before he relocated to Europe in 2005. Based primarily in London, he collaborated with (and was signed by) the UK's Shapeshifters, breakbeat pioneer Stanton Warriors and ex-Sugababes Mutya Buena.

Shave's work on four Top 10 UK and Top 5 Billboard dance productions for the Hed Kandi label drew the attention of French disco magnate Cerrone, for whom he produced two platinum selling tracks featuring house diva Katherine Ellis of Freemasons fame.

During 2008, Shave co-wrote & produced Darren Hayes’ (of Savage Garden) 3rd solo album This Delicate Thing We’ve Made. Shave toured extensively with Hayes as a musical director, performing keytar onstage from Moscow to Chicago. His expertise in the technical field led him to Berlin, where he played his custom-built machine, the Okkam 01.

Shave has worked closely with Australian band the Potbelleez. He was the producer and co-writer of the Potbelleez Album “Destination Now”, which featured the Gold Single “Hello” and the Platinum single “From the Music”, which won the 2011 APRA award for Dance Work of the Year.

In 2010 Shave partnered with music, tech and commerce specialist Charlton Hill, to establish Uncanny Valley - a music and sonic branding company.

== Discography ==
Albums

- Etherfox - Etherfox (2004)
- Antigone - Antigoneland (2008)
- Darren Hayes - This Delicate Thing We’ve Made (2008)

Singles

- Etherfox - The Whirled You Live (2004)
- Antigone - More Man than Man (2008)
- The Potbelleez - Hello (2010)
