= All's Well That Ends Well (Man album) =

Live album by Man
- Released: November 1977
- Recorded: 10–12 December 1976
- Venue: The Roundhouse, Chalk Farm
- Length: 40:25 (original album); 132:02 (re-release)
- Label: MCA
- Producer: Doug Bennett

Man chronology
The Welsh Connection (1976)	All's Well That Ends Well (1977)	Friday 13th (1984)

Professional ratings
Review scores
Source	Rating
AllMusic	3/5 stars

All's Well That Ends Well is the twelfth album by the Welsh rock band Man and their final album before splitting up for the first time at the end of 1976. It was recorded live at London's Roundhouse and is the band's third live album.

== Track listing ==
Side one
No.	Title	Writer(s)	Length
1.	"Let the Good Times Roll"	Sam Theard, Fleecie Moore	3:00
2.	"The Welsh Connection"	Mickey Jones, Phil Ryan	7:59
3.	"The Ride and the View"	Deke Leonard	6:01
4.	"Hard Way to Live"	Leonard	3:14

Side two
No.	Title	Writer(s)	Length
1.	"Born With a Future"	Jones, Leonard, Ryan	7:22
2.	"Spunk Rock"	Jones, Leonard, Terry Williams, Ryan	8:31
3.	"Romain"	Martin Ace, Jones, Leonard	4:58

== Re-Release 2014 ==
In 2014 Esoteric Records released a completely remastered issue of All's Well That Ends Well. It is the original album release remastered from the original 24-track tapes and select recordings of the shows from 10 and 11 December 1976 of the three night stint at the Roundhouse. The recordings are a mix of the in-house recordings done by the Roundhouse sound team and the Manor Mobile recordings who also did the gig. This was the last line up until the band reformed in 1984, and captures most of the consistent members who played in Man, other than Micky Jones who never left it.

CD 1 - Original Album Remastered
No.	Title	Length
1.	"Let the Good Times Roll"	3:03
2.	"The Welsh Connection"	8:01
3.	"The Ride and the View"	6:04
4.	"Hard Way to Live"	3:08
5.	"Born with a Future"	7:45
6.	"Spunk Rock"	8:37
7.	"Romain"	5:03

CD 2 - The Roundhouse 10th & 11th December 1976
No.	Title	Writer(s)	Length
1.	"Let the Good Times Roll"		2:47
2.	"7171 551"	Leonard	5:18
3.	"The Welsh Connection"		8:14
4.	"Babe, I'm Gonna Leave You"	Anne Bredon, Edward Darling, Paul Bennett	5:02
5.	"The Ride and the View"		6:16
6.	"C'Mon"	Jones, Ryan, Willams, Clive John	16:25

The Tracks 2–6 are from the 10th and track 1 is from the 11th shows.

CD 3 - The Roundhouse 10th & 11th December 1976
No.	Title	Writer(s)	Length
1.	"Born with a Future"		7:25
2.	"Many Are Called, but Few Get Up"	Ace, John, Jones, Leonard, Williams	10:32
3.	"A Hard Way to Live"		3:29
4.	"Bananas"	John, Jones, Ryan	11:55
5.	"Spunk Rock"	John, Jones	7:41
6.	"Romain"		5:17

The tracks 1–3 are from the 10th and tracks 4–6 are from the 11th shows.

== Personnel ==
- Micky Jones – vocals & guitar
- Deke Leonard – vocals & guitar
- Phil Ryan – vocals & keyboards
- John McKenzie – vocals & bass
- Terry Williams – vocals & drums

=== Credits ===
- Mixing – Doug Bennett, Jeffrey Hooper
