= Sentimental Killer =

Studio album by Mary Coughlan
- Released: March 1992
- Recorded: July–August 1991
- Studio: Westland Studios, Dublin, Ireland
- Genre: Pop, rock, New age
- Length: 42:40
- Label: Warner Music
- Producer: Eric Visser

Mary Coughlan chronology
Uncertain Pleasures (1988)	Sentimental Killer (1992)	Love for Sale (1992)

Sentimental Killer is an album by Irish Mary Coughlan that was released by East West Records, a subsidiary of Warner Music Group.

The song "Magdalene Laundry", written by Johnny Mulhern, refers to the Magdalen Asylums run by the Roman Catholic Church in which Irish prostitutes, unmarried mothers, developmentally-challenged women, and abused girls were incarcerated indefinitely.

== Track listing ==
1. "There is a Bed" (Marc Almond)
2. "Hearts" (Jacques Brel)
3. "Magdalen Laundry" (Johnny Mulhern)
4. "Francis of Assisi" (Johnny Mulhern)
5. "Love in the Shadows" (D. Long)
6. "Ain't no Cure for Love" (Leonard Cohen)
7. "Handbags and Gladrags" (Mike d'Abo)
8. "Just a Friend of Mine" (Lambregt, Schoufs, Schoovanerts, Francois)
9. "Ballad of a Sad Young Man" (Fran Landesman, Tommy Wolf)
10. "Not up to Scratch" (Nijgh, De Groot)
11. "Sentimental Killer" (Johnny Mulhern)

== Personnel ==
- Mary Coughlan – vocals
- Conor Barry – acoustic guitar, electric guitar
- James Delaney – organ, piano
- Allan Murray – accordion
- Davy Spillane – uilleann pipes
- Paul Moore – bass, double bass
- Peter McKinney – drums
- Noel Eccles – percussion
- Richie Buckley, Ciaran Wilde - saxophone
- Bas Kleine - mouth organ
- Karen Coleman, Rob Strong, Shelly Buckspan - backing vocals
