= Tired and Emotional =

Studio album by Mary Coughlan
- Released: 1985
- Studio: Greenfields, Headford, County Galway, Ireland
- Length: 34:05
- Label: Warner Music
- Producer: Erik Visser

Mary Coughlan chronology
Tired and Emotional (1985)	Under the Influence (1987)

Tired and Emotional is the debut album by Irish singer Mary Coughlan, released in 1985 by East West Records, a subsidiary of Warner Music Group (at the time known as WEA).

== Reception ==
The album sold an unexpected 100,000 copies in Ireland, partly because of a memorable appearance on The Late Late Show. It also received a B+ rating from rock critic Robert Christgau.

== Track listing ==
1. "Double Cross" (Fintan Coughlan)
2. "The Beach" (Antoinette Hensey, Erik Visser)
3. "Meet Me Where They Play the Blues" (Sammy Gallup, Steve Allen)
4. "Delaney's Gone Back on the Wine" (Johnny Mulhern)
5. "Sense of Silence (S.O.S.)" (Antoinette Hensey, Erik Visser)
6. "Nobody's Business/The Tango" (Erik Visser, Everett Robbins, Porter Grainger)
7. "Mama Just Wants to Barrelhouse All Night Long" (Bruce Cockburn)
8. "Country Fair Dance (The Cowboy Song)" (Gerry O'Beirne)
9. "Lady in Green" (Antoinette Hensey, Erik Visser)
10. "Seduced"

== Personnel ==
- Mary Coughlan - vocals
- Erik Visser - guitar, percussion
- Declan Gibbons - guitar
- Gerrard Coffey - guitar, executive producer
- Greg 'Curly' Keranen - double bass
- Micky Belton - drums
- Tony Maher - accordion, synthesizer
- Gerald O'Donoghue - percussion, engineer
- Carl Hession - piano, synthesizer
- Pat MacNamara - accordion
- Johnny "Ringo" McDonagh - bones
- Keith Donald, Tony Chambers - saxophone
- Jimmy Higgins, Snr. - trumpet
