= After the Fall (Mary Coughlan album) =

Studio album by Mary Coughlan
- Released: 1997
- Label: Big Cat/V2
- Producer: Erik Visser

Mary Coughlan chronology
Live in Galway (1996)	After the Fall (1997)	Long Honeymoon (1999)

After the Fall is an album by the Irish musician Mary Coughlan, released in 1997. It followed a tumultuous period in her life, after which she embraced sobriety.

After the Fall was Coughlan's first studio album to be widely distributed in the United States. A video was produced for "When I Am Laid in Earth", which was shot at Neil Jordan's former house.

== Production ==
Recorded in Ireland, the album was produced by Erik Visser. The lyrics to "Dilemma" were based on a poem by Dorothy Parker. "Saint Judy" was written by Marc Almond. "Poison Words" is about domestic violence. "When I Am Laid in Earth" is based on the composition by Henry Purcell.

== Critical reception ==
Professional ratings
Review scores
Source	Rating
AllMusic	4.5/5 stars
The Buffalo News	5/5 stars
Robert Christgau	(choice cut)
The Encyclopedia of Popular Music	3/5 stars
MusicHound Rock: The Essential Album Guide	4.5/5 stars
The State	5/5 stars

New Internationalist called "Woman Undone" "a stunningly well-wrought take on the lapsarian fable... Powered along by plucked strings and an airy, expansive feel, it's both wry and angry." The Morning Call determined that Coughlan weaves "this chronicle of bouts with addiction and depression and the pain of divorce with coal-black humor." Robert Christgau praised "Sunburn".

Newsday stated: "A quietly smoldering singer whose authoritative voice is tinged with smoky traces of blues and jazz, Coughlan makes adult pop music about adult problems." The Guardian concluded that "the enervated piano/sax backing is classic torch." The St. Paul Pioneer Press deemed After the Fall "a stunning album that should be heard by anyone who thinks that the music industry doesn't have time for quality anymore and that 'women's music' is relegated to airbrushed pop and video-friendly babes."

AllMusic wrote: "Inflected with whimsy, wonder and cynicism, Coughlan wends her way through torch songs and laments of women undone, men unemployed and the world in confusion."

== Track listing ==
No.	Title	Length
1.	"Woman Undone"
2.	"Sunburn"
3.	"Still in Love"
4.	"Lucy's Dream"
5.	"John Fell Off the Work Around"
6.	"Dilemma"
7.	"Poison Words"
8.	"Run Away Teddy"
9.	"That Face"
10.	"Nobody"
11.	"The Black Crow"
12.	"Saint Judy"
13.	"When I Am Laid in Earth"
