= Love for Sale (Mary Coughlan album) =

Live album by Mary Coughlan
- Released: 27 July 1995
- Recorded: 22–24 February 1993
- Venue: Mean Fiddler, London
- Length: 51:19
- Label: Demon
- Producer: Erik Visser

Mary Coughlan chronology
Sentimental Killer (1992)	Love for Sale (1995)	Live in Galway (1996)

Love for Sale is an album by Irish singer Mary Coughlan that was released in July 1995 by Demon Records.

== Track listing ==
1. "A Thrill's a Thrill" (Long John Baldry)
2. "Moon Over Bourbon Street" (Sting)
3. "Baby Plays Around" (Elvis Costello, Cait O'Riordan)
4. "You Go to My Head" (J. Fred Coots, Haven Gillespie)
5. "Love for Sale" (Cole Porter)
6. "A Fine Romance" (Dorothy Fields, Jerome Kern)
7. "Damn Your Eyes" (Steve Bogard, Barbara Wyrick)
8. "To Love a Man" (Mary Coughlan, Antoinette Hensey)
9. "Drinking the Diamonds" (D. Long)
10. "Upon a Veil of Midnight Blue" (Elvis Costello)
11. "These Boots Are Made for Walkin'" (Lee Hazlewood)
12. "You Send Me" (Sam Cooke)

== Personnel ==
- Mary Coughlan – vocals
- Richie Buckley – saxophone
- James Delaney – keyboard
- Dick Farrelly – guitar
- Paul Moore – double bass
- Robbie Casserly – drums
- Erik Visser – producer
