= The Welsh Connection =

Studio album by Man
- Released: March 1976
- Recorded: December 1975 – February 1976
- Studio: Olympic Studios, Barnes
- Length: 41:05
- Label: MCA
- Producer: Man

Man chronology
Maximum Darkness (1975)	The Welsh Connection (1976)	All's Well That Ends Well (1977)

Professional ratings
Review scores
Source	Rating
AllMusic	2/5 stars
Christgau's Record Guide	C+

The Welsh Connection (stylized on the cover as Welsh-Connection) is the eleventh album by the Welsh rock band Man and was released on the MCA Records label 1976. It was their first MCA release, and the first after a change of line-up that saw John McKenzie take over on bass from Martin Ace, and Phil Ryan rejoin. Ryan had worked with Pete Brown in the interim, and arranged for Brown to play on two tracks.

The track "Something is Happening" was sampled on "Break the Bank" a 2014 single by rapper Schoolboy Q.

== Track listing ==
Side one
No.	Title	Writer(s)	Length
1.	"The Ride and the View"	Deke Leonard	5:01
2.	"Out of Your Head"	Leonard	4:04
3.	"Love Can Find a Way"	John McKenzie	5:13
4.	"The Welsh Connection"	Phil Ryan, Micky Jones	7:18

Side two
No.	Title	Writer(s)	Length
1.	"Something is Happening"	Ryan	6:21
2.	"Car Toon"	Leonard, Ryan	6:01
3.	"Born with a Future"	Jones, Leonard, Ryan	7:07

Bonus track
No.	Title	Writer(s)	Length
8.	"(I'm a) Love-Taker" (b-side "Out of Your Head" single)	Leonard	2:47

== Personnel ==
- Micky Jones – vocals, guitar
- Deke Leonard – vocals, guitar
- Phil Ryan – vocals, keyboards
- John McKenzie – vocals, bass
- Terry Williams – vocals, drums

=== Credits ===
- Doug Bennett – engineer
- Nigel Brooke-Heart – tape operation and vocal on "Car Toon"
- Caromay Dixon – vocal on "Something is Happening"
- Jeffrey Hooper – vocal on "Out of Your Head"
- Anton Matthews – vocal on "Out of Your Head"
- Pete Brown – African talking drums on "The Welsh Connection" and "Something is Happening"
- Andrew Lauder – mixing
- Joe Petagno – cover design
