= Greasy Truckers Live at Dingwalls Dance Hall =

Live album by various artists
- Released: 1973
- Recorded: 8 October 1973
- Venue: Camden Town, London
- Studio: The Manor Mobile
- Genre: Progressive rock
- Length: 84:00
- Label: Caroline (UK) GT 4997
- Producer: Richard Elen

Greasy Truckers chronology
Greasy Truckers Party (1972)	Greasy Truckers Live at Dingwalls Dance Hall (1973)

Greasy Truckers Live at Dingwalls Dance Hall is a 1973 live double album by various artists recorded at an October 1973 Greasy Truckers concert at the Dingwalls Dance Hall at Camden Lock in Camden Town, London. The concert featured four bands, Camel, Henry Cow, Global Village Trucking Company and Gong, and was recorded with Virgin Records' The Manor Mobile recording truck.

Notwithstanding its title, not all the tracks on the album are from the Dingwalls Dance Hall concert. Due to delays in starting the event and a 2am curfew, Henry Cow's set (billed last) was curtailed to 10 minutes, and their contribution here was recorded a week later at Virgin's Manor Studio. An outtake from this session, "Bellycan" was released on the first (re-mixed) CD-release of their album, Legend. The first Gong track was recorded at an open-air festival at Tabarka, Tunisia in June 1973, and the second was recorded live at Sheffield City Hall in Sheffield, England in October 1973.

Greasy Truckers was "a loose organisation of individuals whose ideals were based on those of the Diggers in San Francisco, recycling money into worthwhile causes." This album was the second in a series of two albums recorded at concerts in London organised by Greasy Truckers, the first being Greasy Truckers Party (1972), released via United Artists. All proceeds from the concert and LP sales went to Greasy Truckers.

== Track listing ==
Side one: Camel (19:10)

1. "God of Light Revisited (parts one, two & three)" (Bardens)

Side two: Henry Cow (21:30)

1. "Off the Map"
  - "Solo Piano" (Hodgkinson)
  - "Trio" (Hodgkinson, Cutler, Frith)
2. "Cafe Royal" (solo guitar) (Frith)
3. "Keeping Warm in Winter" (Frith, Greaves)
4. "Sweet Heart of Mine" (Henry Cow)

Side three: Global Village Trucking Company (23:05)

1. "Look Into Me"
2. "Earl Stonham (The Gunslinger)"
3. "You're a Floozy Madame Karma (But I Love Your Lowdown Ways)"
4. "Everybody Needs a Good Friend"

Side four: Gong (20:15)

1. "General Flash of the United Hallucinations"
2. "Part 32 Floating Anarchy"

== Personnel ==
=== Camel ===
- Peter Bardens – organ, vocals
- Doug Ferguson – bass guitar
- Andrew Latimer – guitar, vocals
- Andy Ward – drums

=== Henry Cow ===
- Chris Cutler – drums, vocals
- Fred Frith – guitar, violin, vocals
- John Greaves – bass guitar, piano, vocals
- Tim Hodgkinson – piano, organ, clarinet, alto saxophone, vocals
- Geoff Leigh – tenor and soprano saxophone, flute, clarinet, recorder

=== Global Village Trucking Company ===
- Jon Owen – vocals, 12-string guitar
- John McKenzie – bass guitar
- Mike Medora – guitar
- Jimmy Lascelles – organ, piano
- Simon Stewart-Richardson – drums

=== Gong ===
- Daevid Allen ("Dingo Virgin") – local vocals, glissando guitar
- Steve Hillage ("Stevie Hillside-Village") – kundali guitar, submarine spiral
- Gilli Smyth ("Shakti Yoni") – "away at the Bananamoon Observatory keeping the bulge warm and studying new spells"
- Mike Howlett ("Mr T Being") – fingerbass
- Tim Blake ("Hi T Moonweed") – Cynthia size A, crystal machine
- Didier Malherbe ("Bloomdido Bad De Grass") – saxophone, gnomophone
- Pierre Moerlen ("Pierre De Strasbourg") – drums, overdrive

The album was mixed and produced at Island Records' Basing Street Studios by Richard G Elen, later a magazine editor, noted alternative technology guru and green activist among other occupations alongside that of sound engineer/producer. His name appeared wrongly as "Elan" on the cover.

Sources: Discogs, liner notes.

== Re-issues ==
- The Henry Cow tracks on this album were re-issued on the CD release of their Concerts album.
- The Camel tracks on this album were re-issued on their 2000 "official bootleg" CD Gods of Light '73-'75.
- The second Gong track was included on the "Live In Sheffield" CD on Mantra Records.
