= Better Late Than Never (Cold River Lady album) =

Studio album by Cold River Lady
- Released: 2010
- Recorded: 1992
- Genre: Rock
- Label: Angel Air
- Producer: Pete Brown

Better Late Than Never is the first studio album by Cold River Lady. It was recorded in 1992, produced by Pete Brown, and mixed by Pete Kerr.

The recording comprised original band members Phil Weaver (vocals, 12 string acoustic guitar, six string electric guitar), Will Wright (descant and tenor recorders, Hammond C3 organ, electric piano, synthesiser), Paul Cheshire (lead guitar, vocals) and Helen Hardy (vocals).

The rhythm section used for this recording was John MacKenzie, one of the UK's top session bassists who had become a good friend of band members Hardy and Wright (as well as having worked with producer Pete Brown many times) and Bob Jenkins (also a top UK drummer) who was a friend of Hardy's as well as a regular session partner of MacKenzie's.

The rhythm tracks were recorded in Stoke-on-Trent, with over-dubs at Pete Kerr's studio in east London and mixed in Stoke by Pete Kerr, Pete Brown and Will Wright.

The album was released in August 2010 by Angel Air Records.

== Track listing ==
1. English Graffiti (music: Phil Weaver / lyrics: Mike Lawley)
2. The Promise (music and lyrics: Phil Weaver)
3. Something (music and lyrics: Paul Cheshire)
4. Soft Spot Rest (music: Phil Weaver, Will Wright, Paul Cheshire / lyrics: Mike Lawley)
5. Routing Through The Quagmires (music: Paul Cheshire, Will Wright / lyrics: Paul Cheshire)
6. Hereford Girls (music: Phil Weaver / lyrics: Pete Brown)
7. Sauna Bath Blues (music: Phil Weaver, Will Wright / lyrics: Mike Lawley)
8. The Travellers (music: Phil Weaver / lyrics: Mike Lawley)
9. October Love (music: Paul Cheshire / lyrics: Mike Lawley)
10. Far In The Fields (music: Phil Weaver, Will Wright / lyrics: Mike Lawley)
11. Living The Lazy Way (music: Phil Weaver, Will Wright / lyrics: Mike Lawley)
