= Uncertain Pleasures =

Studio album by Mary Coughlan
- Released: 1990
- Studio: Townhouse 3, London; Terminal, London
- Length: 40:12
- Label: East West
- Producer: Pete Glenister, Kevin Moloney, Mark E Nevin

Mary Coughlan chronology
Ancient Rain (1988)	Uncertain Pleasures (1990)	Sentimental Killer (1992)

Uncertain Pleasures is an album by the Irish singer Mary Coughlan. It was released in 1990 by East West Records. Coughlan did not like the album as she felt that too much content was dictated by her record label.

== Track listing ==
1. "Man of the World" (Pete Glenister)
2. "I Can Dream Can't I" (Irving Kahal, Sammy Fain)
3. "Whiskey Didn't Kill the Pain" (John Duhan)
4. "Leaf from a Tree" (Mark E. Nevin)
5. "The Little Death" (Bob Geldof, Pete Briquette)
6. "Invisible to You" (Pete Glenister, Scott Wilk)
7. "I Get Along Without You Very Well" (Hoagy Carmichael)
8. "Heartbreak Hotel" (Elvis Presley, Mae Boren Axton, Tommy Durden)
9. "Red Ribbon" (Mark E. Nevin)
10. "Mother's Little Helper" (Mick Jagger, Keith Richards)

== Personnel ==
- Mary Coughlan – vocals
- Guy Barker – trumpet (5)
- Conor Barry – guitar (2,3,5,8)
- Pete Glenister – guitar (1–3,5–7,9,10); bass programming (1)
- Christian Marsac – guitar (6,10)
- Mark E Nevin – guitar (4,9)
- Bob Andrew – keyboards (1–3,5,6,8,10)
- Richie Buckley – soprano saxophone (8)
- Gavin Povey – accordion (9)
- Roger Beaujolais – glockenspiel (4)
- Helen O'Hara – violin (9)
- Pat Collins – violin (1,10)
- Simon Edwards – double bass (4,9)
- John McKenzie – bass (3,5,6,10)
- Danny Thompson – bass (1,2,7,8)
- Neil Conti – drums (tracks 1,6,8,10); brushes (5)
- Blair Cunningham – drums (3)
- Roy Dodds – drums (4,9)
- Jeff Dunn – drums (5)
- Phil Overhead – percussion (1,3,5,6,9,10); drums (2)
- Frank Collins – backing vocals (1)
- Fran Kapelle – backing vocals (5,9,10)
- Kirsty MacColl – backing vocals (6)
- Ebo Ross – backing vocals (1)
- Nigel Rush – backing vocals (1)
- Violet Williams – backing vocals (5,9,10)
