= Mary Coughlan (singer) =

Irish singer

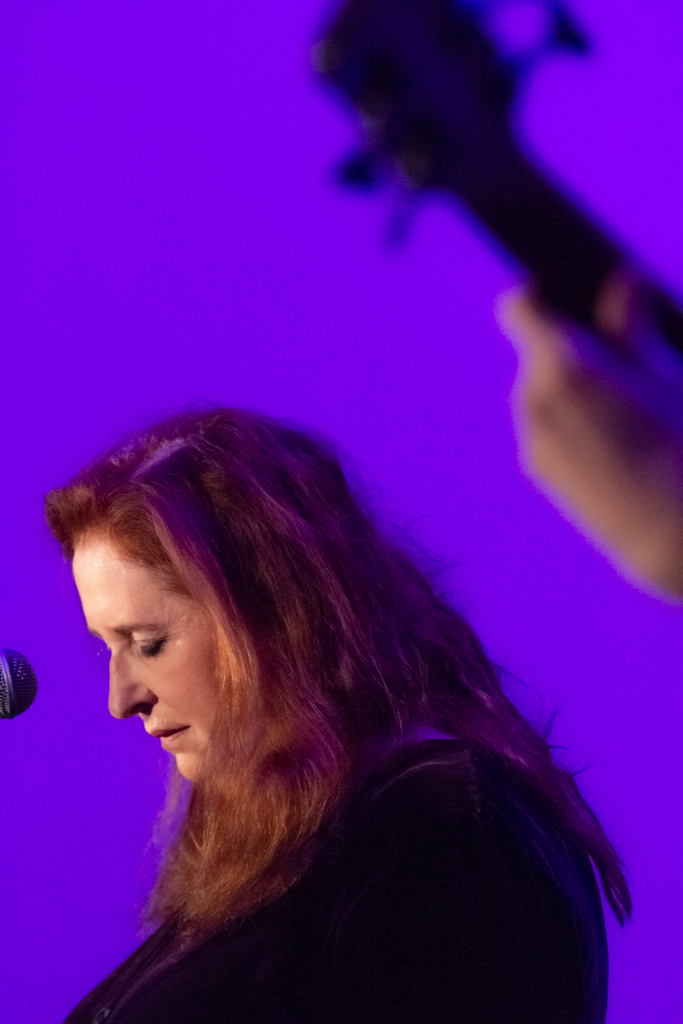
- Coughlan at The Met in Bury, April 2019

Background information
- Born: Mary Doherty; 5 May 1956 (age 69); Galway, Ireland
- Genres: Jazz; soul; blues
- Occupations: Singer; writer; actress
- Years active: 1984–present
- Labels: WEA; East West; Tradition & Moderne; Hail Mary
- Website: marycoughlan.ie

Mary Coughlan (born 5 May 1956) is an Irish singer.

== Background ==
Mary Coughlan was born in Galway, Ireland. Her father was a soldier from County Donegal. She was the eldest of five and had endured an erratic youth. She left convent school and started drinking alcohol and taking other drugs when she was fifteen. At this age she spent time in a mental hospital. After time in hospital and a belated graduation, Coughlan decided to leave home. In the mid-1970s, she moved to London, England, where she married Fintan Coughlan and had three children. In 1981, she left her husband and took custody of her children. In 1984, she moved back to her hometown of Galway. On her return to Ireland, when she started to perform in public, she was noticed by Dutch musician and producer Erik Visser.

== Musical career ==
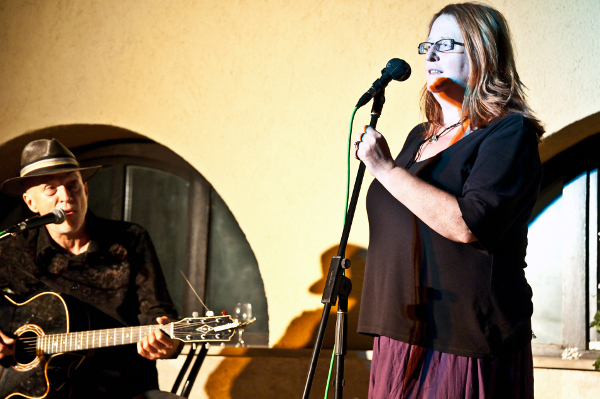
Vlado Kreslin and Mary Coughlan

Visser, whose band Flairck was popular in Europe, helped Coughlan record her first album, Tired and Emotional. Visser went on to become her long-term collaborator. The album sold an unexpected 100,000 copies in Ireland, partly because of an appearance on The Late Late Show. Despite problems, Coughlan continued to reap praise for her recording output on WEA. On Under the Influence (1987) she sang the 1948 Peggy Lee hit "Don't Smoke in Bed" and the Billie Holiday ballad "Good Morning Heartache", as well as Jimmy McCarthy's "Ride On", which reached number 5 on the Irish pop chart in 1987. In 1988 she made her acting debut in Neil Jordan's High Spirits.

In 1990, she signed with East West Records, which released her third album, Uncertain Pleasures, recorded in the UK and produced by Pete Glenister, former music director for Terence Trent D'Arby. It included compositions by Mark Nevin and cover versions of the Rolling Stones' "Mother's Little Helper" and Elvis Presley's "Heartbreak Hotel." Sentimental Killer (1992) and Love for Sale (1993) were received well. In 1994, she lent her vocals to A Woman's Heart Vol.2 album with Mary Black and Dolores Keane. She released Live in Galway and in 1997 After the Fall, which became her American debut.

In June 2000, Coughlan took another turn in her career when she presented a series of multimedia shows in Dublin and London celebrating Billie Holiday, a singer whose life had parallels to Coughlan's. Material from these shows was collected on Mary Coughlan Sings Billie Holiday. In April 2001 Long Honeymoon was released, and in 2002 Red Blues. She appeared on the RTÉ reality television charity show Celebrity Farm. The House of Ill Repute was released in 2008. She participated in the album Sanctuary with Moya Brennan.

== Woman Undone ==
In 2018, Coughlan collaborated with the Brokentalkers and Valgeir Sigurðsson, to create Woman Undone, a fusion of theatre, music and dance to re-imagine her life and childhood. It tells the story of a young woman who endured abuse, addiction and mental illness and whose discovery of art and music was her redemption.

The premiere took place at Projects Art Centre, Dublin, featuring Mary Coughlan alongside female quartet Mongoose performing an original score by Valgeir Sigurðsson which fuses electronic music with live instrumentation and a haunting vocal score. Woman Undone was nominated in two categories for the Irish Times Theatre Awards: Best Sound for Mary Coughlan, Mongoose and Valgeir Sigurðsson; Best Movement: Eddie Kay.

== Personal life ==
After Tired and Emotional, Coughlan faced mismanagement of her career. She lost her car, house, and recording contract with Warner Music. She drank alcohol excessively and was hospitalized more than thirty times. She recovered in 1994 and had two children with Frank Bonadio. A public spat with singer Sinéad O'Connor ensued over Bonadio's affections.

Coughlan has spoken about the role of women in Irish society. In September 2017, she walked out of an interview with Newstalk presenter George Hook in response to comments made by the presenter about rape victims.

== Awards ==
In 2020, Mary received a lifetime achievement award by the Mayor of Galway in recognition of her impact on the cultural life of the city.

== Discography ==
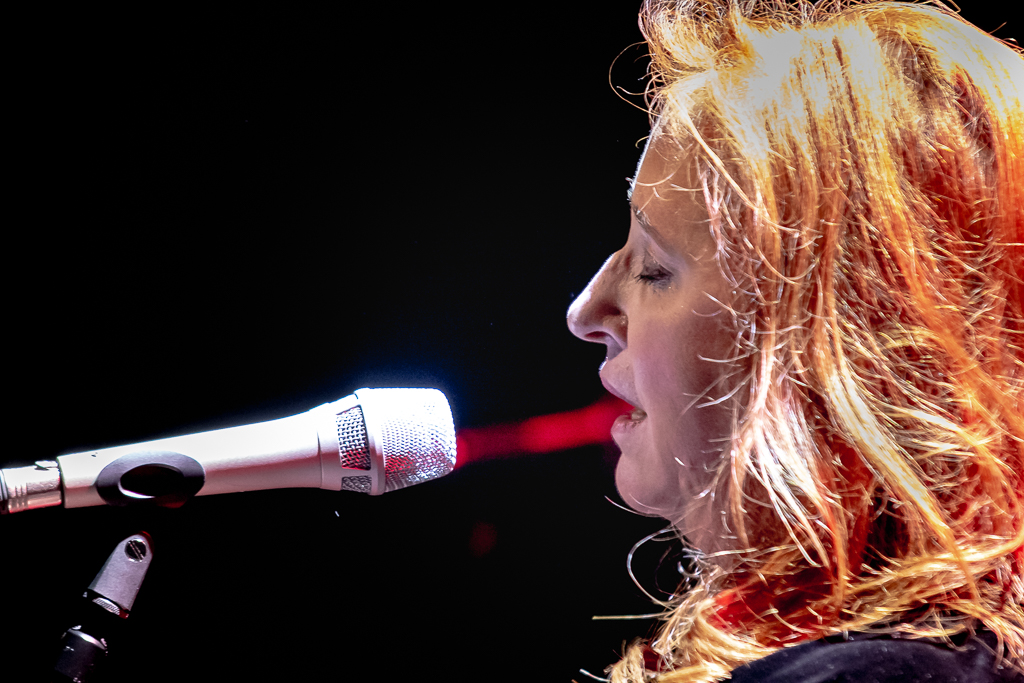

- Tired and Emotional (Mystery, 1985)
- Under the Influence (Mystery, 1987)
- Uncertain Pleasures (East West, 1990)
- Sentimental Killer (East West, 1992)
- Love for Sale (Demon, 1993)
- Love Me or Leave Me: The Best of Mary Coughlan (WEA International, 1994)
- Live in Galway (Big Cat, 1995)
- After the Fall (Big Cat/V2, 1997)
- Long Honeymoon (Evangeline 1999)
- Mary Coughlan Sings Billie Holiday (Evangeline, 2000)
- Red Blues (Cadiz/Pinnacle, 2002)
- Live at the Basement (Hail Mary, 2003)
- The House of Ill Repute (Rubyworks, 2008)
- The Whole Affair: The Very Best of Mary Coughlan (Celebrating 25 Years) (Hail Mary Records, 2012)
- Scars on the Calendar (Hail Mary, 2015)
- Live & Kicking (Hail Mary Records, 2018)
- Life Stories (Hail Mary Records, 2020)
- Repeat Rewind (Strange Brew Rekkids, 2024)
