= Space Monkey (band) =

British pop group

Space Monkey was a British pop group from the mid-1980s, led by singer–songwriter and guitarist Paul Goodchild. The group's sole album was 1985's On the Beam, issued in the UK by Innervision Records and in the US by MCA. A previous charting single release, "Can't Stop Running", was issued in 1983 on Innervision Records. It peaked at number 53 in the UK Singles Chart in October 1983.

== History ==
Space Monkey was not a "group" per se; Goodchild was the only person to appear on every one of On the Beam's tracks. Various session musicians were used, including Wham!'s backup band and members of Bow Wow Wow. Also contributing was keyboard player Adrian Lee, who would later join Mike + the Mechanics.

== Discography ==
=== Studio albums ===
- On the Beam (1985)

=== Singles ===
- "Can't Stop Running...." (1983)
- "Come with Me" (1984)
- "One More Shot" (1985)
- "Only the Night" (1986)
