= Dingwalls =

Music and comedy venue in Camden, London

Dingwalls Dancehall
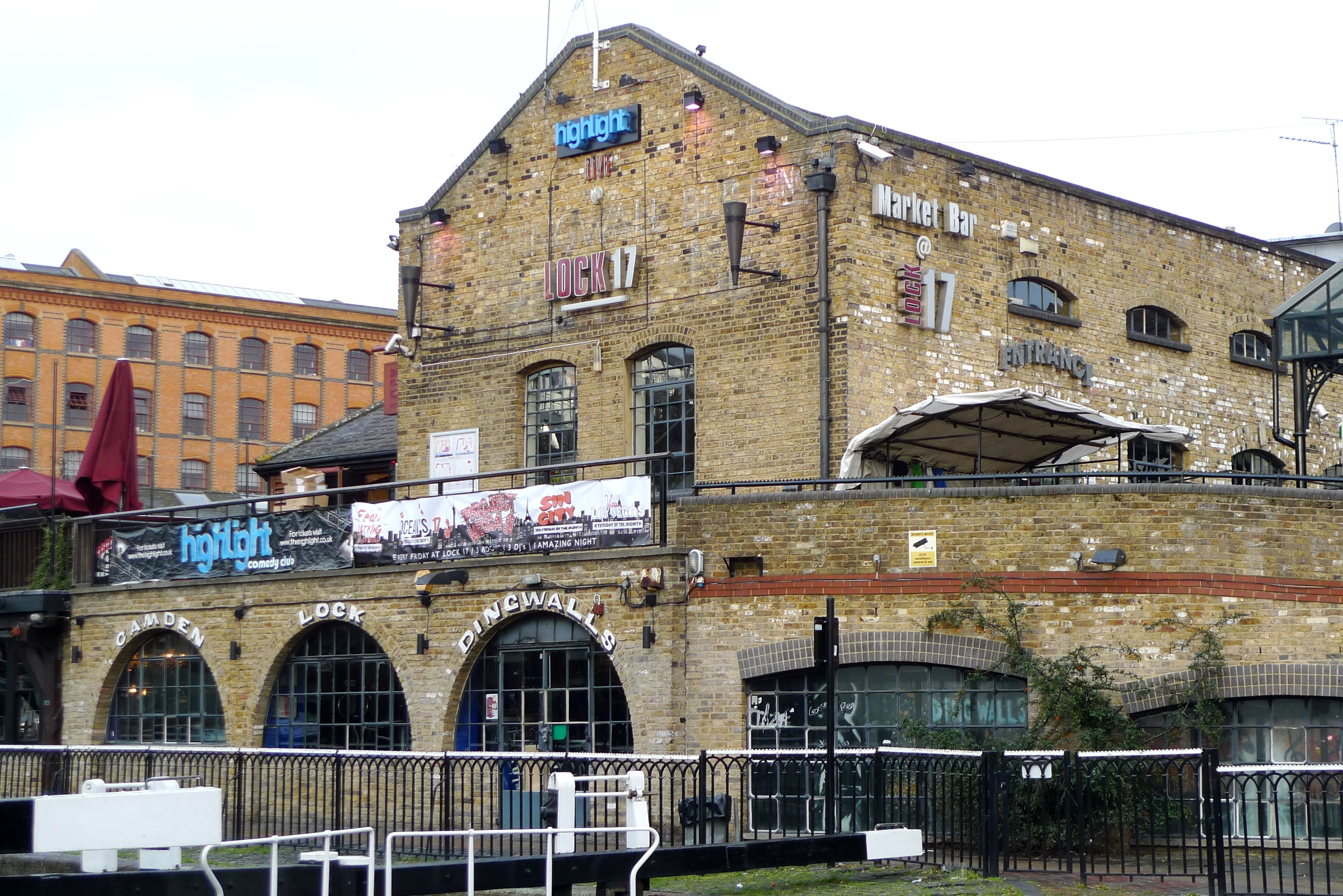
- Lock 17, a bar connected to Dingwalls
- Interactive map of Dingwalls Dancehall
- Address: East Yard, 11 Camden Lock Pl; London; United Kingdom
- Coordinates: 51.5413°N 0.1458°W
- Capacity: 500

Construction
- Opened: 1973

Website
- dingwalls.com

Dingwalls Dancehall (original name at time of opening) is a live music and comedy venue adjacent to Camden Lock, Camden in London. The building itself is one of many industrial Victorian buildings which were put to new use in the 20th century. The original owner of the building, T.E. Dingwall, had his name painted on to the outside wall of the building, which was a common practice by businesses in Camden Town during the late Victorian era. The paint is still visible to this day, hence the venue's name.

The 500-capacity venue was bought by promoter Vince Power in June 2020 and continues to host gigs of contemporary music. It was renamed and reopened as The PowerHaus after a copyright issue blocked the use of its original name. Power now has use of the name again and the building has returned to being Dingwalls. There is a smaller 100 capacity intimate live music venue in the canal bar which regularly puts on unsigned artists.

== History ==
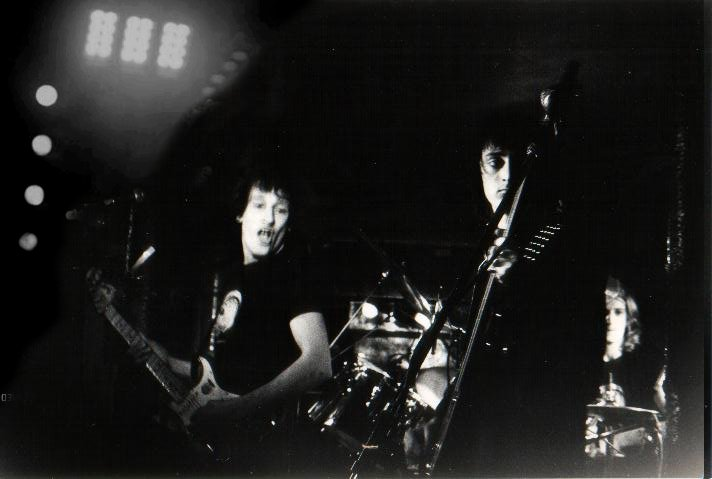
Killerhertz performing at Dingwalls in 1981

First launched as the newly developed Camden Lock's flagship venue in the summer of 1973. The Natural Acoustic Band performed five times between July and November 1973. Dingwalls Dancehall was open to all, "reasonably priced at half a bar for entry", providing the longest bar in London (at the time), near-pub price drinks, and New York-style burgers and chickpeas. It wasn't a club, yet stayed open till 2 am, hosting acts such as funk band Gonzalez, and pub rockers Kilburn and the High Roads. Reviewed in one music paper the first summer, it was immediately recognised as plugging the "vast gap in the social and financial standings of various venues", where you can "eat, drink, boogie and listen to a live set during an evening which lasts till two"... "late enough for most people" (those were the days!) - and "excellent bands are to be found there".

Music was first managed by former Hendrix road manager Howard 'H' Parker. Following Parker's death, Dave 'The Boss' Goodman, who also doubled as chef and DJ, took over from the mid 1970s to mid 1980s.

In 1989, it ceased to present live shows - the premises were taken over by the Lock market.

By the early 1990s, the original Dingwalls Dancehall had been converted into a venue for the jazz dance club 'Talkin Loud and Saying Something', run by Gilles Peterson and Patrick Forge. Since the 2000s, the pair returned to Dingwalls with 'Another Sunday afternoon at Dingwalls', afternoon sessions that present live artists and DJs.

== Notable performances ==
Dingwalls became a prominent and popular London live music venue in the pub rock and Punk rock era of the mid to late 1970s. Nevertheless, the booking policy was eclectic, finding time for visiting US acts such as Etta James and Blondie in 1978 and The Drifters and R.E.M. in 1983.

In the 21st century artists performing at Dingwalls have included: James Bay, You Me At Six, Modestep, Noel Gallagher, The Posies, Imagine Dragons, Red Hot Chili Peppers, Sigma, Stereophonics, George Ezra, Ellie Goulding, The Darkness, Gallows, Foo Fighters, American Blues singer Beth Hart and, in 2011, 'Venison' (a pseudonym of The Strokes, for the purposes of a 'secret' comeback show). On 9 October 2025, Robbie Williams played the smallest ticketed concert of his career to date at the venue to promote his 13th studio album, Britpop, performing both his debut album Life thru a Lens and Britpop in their entirety.

On 6 December 2011, Coldplay played the venue as part of BBC Radio 2's 'Live in Concert' series.

On 15 April 2023, Kaiser Chiefs did a special benefit show at the venue in aid of Amnesty International in conjunction with Richer Unsigned.

== Recordings ==
- Greasy Truckers Live at Dingwalls Dance Hall recorded on 8 October 1973.
- Steve Marriott: Packet of Three (recorded on 6 July 1984)
- Desmond Dekker: Officially Live and Rare. Recorded 1989.
