= Antigone Foster =

Antigone (Tiggy) Foster, professionally known as Antigone, is a London-based Australian recording artist and songwriter.

Antigone's debut single "More Man Than Man" was released in 2008. Her second single "Promiscuity" was released on 6 April 2009. The song received mainly positive reviews. Blog Popjustice said about "Promiscuity": "A surefire hit for anyone whose two favourite genres are pop music that sounds like dance music and dance music that sounds like pop music."

Antigone's first album AntigoneLand was released on 20 April 2009, and is produced by Justin Shave. Shave invented his own soft instrument, the Okkam 01, from Native Instruments' Reaktor for the album, and then manufactured a custom-built correlating MIDI box. Native Instruments were so impressed they now commission him for sound design.

== Discography ==
=== Albums ===
- AntigoneLand (2009)

=== Singles ===
- "More Man Than Man" (2008)
- "Promiscuity" (2009)
