= Adriana Breukink =

Dutch recorder maker (died 2022)

Adriana Breukink (born 27 May 1957 in Rotterdam, died 6 October 2022) was a Dutch recorder maker and player from Enschede, Netherlands, who made Renaissance, baroque and modern instruments.

== Life and career ==
Breukink was introduced to the recorder by an aunt when she was nine years old. She attended the Royal Conservatory of The Hague where she worked with Frans Brüggen and Ricardo Kanji. The recorder maker Fred Morgan offered classes at the Conservatory, and Breukink worked with him to make a Ganassi recorder. By the time she had completed her solo exam in 1980, she had decided to become an instrument maker.

Breukink became a leader in the development of new recorders. In 1997, she developed a Ganassi-based recorder with a chin-controlled dynamic slide extension for Moeck. In an effort to develop a Renaissance style recorder for use by beginners she developed the Adri's Dream recorder in collaboration with Mollenhauer in 1999. She later expanded this line to include Dream Edition recorders for more advanced players. In conjunction with Küng, she introduced the Eagle Recorder for professional players in 2007.

Breukink was a member of the Bassano Quartet, who perform on a variety of her instruments up to three meters tall.

Breukink died on 6 October 2022.

== Documentaries ==
Some video documentaries have been published about Adriana Breukink and the recorders she developed.

- In 2026 a documentary by Daniël Brüggen about the life and inventions of Breukink was published under the title Dream
- In 2022 Sarah Jeffery published this tribute on video channel Team Recorder: Tribute to Adriana Breukink
