= Küng Blockflöten GmbH =

Küng Blockflöten GmbH is a recorder making business in Schaffhausen, Switzerland.

== History ==
Franz Küng (November 11, 1906 – 1983) started a music store and piano tuning business in 1933 after completing a piano maker apprenticeship in Germany and the Netherlands. He began working on recorders in 1938 due to a ban on imports of these instruments from Germany and began to manufacture them in the 1940s. His sons, Thomas and Andreas Küng, became involved in the firm in the 1960s, and were appointed his successors in 1974. Thomas' son Stefan became CEO in 2015.

Working with Adriana Breukink, they introduced the Eagle Recorder for professional players in 2007.
