= Bogenhauser Künstlerkapelle =

The Bogenhauser Künstlerkapelle was a German recorder consort. It was founded 1890 in Munich and existed until World War II.

Members were the sculpturers Georg Petzold and professor Heinrich Düll, the architect Sedlmaier, the Drs. Rentsch and Aichinger as well as the musician Josef Wagner. The consort played on original recorders, supplemented by a guitar and kettledrums. The Kapelle performed in the Residenztheater and the Deutsches Museum in Munich. Their music was broadcast by radio. The consort was probably the first German recorder consort of modern time.

== Literature ==
- Hermann Moeck: Zur Nachgeschichte und Renaissance der Blockflöte
- Windkanal 2006 Nr. 3: Peter Harlan im Spiegel der Geschichte
- Monika Lustig: Die Holzblasinstrumente der Bogenhauser Künstler-Kapelle. (Michaelsteiner Konferenzberichte.)
- Fritz Buek: Die Gitarre und ihre Meister

Video of the first concert with the repertory of the Bogenhauser Künstlerkapelle in the original cast. ensemble arcimboldo, 2011

Video of the recording of the Bogenhauser Künstlerkapelle repertory in the original cast. ensemble arcimboldo, 2017
