= Thomas Stanesby =

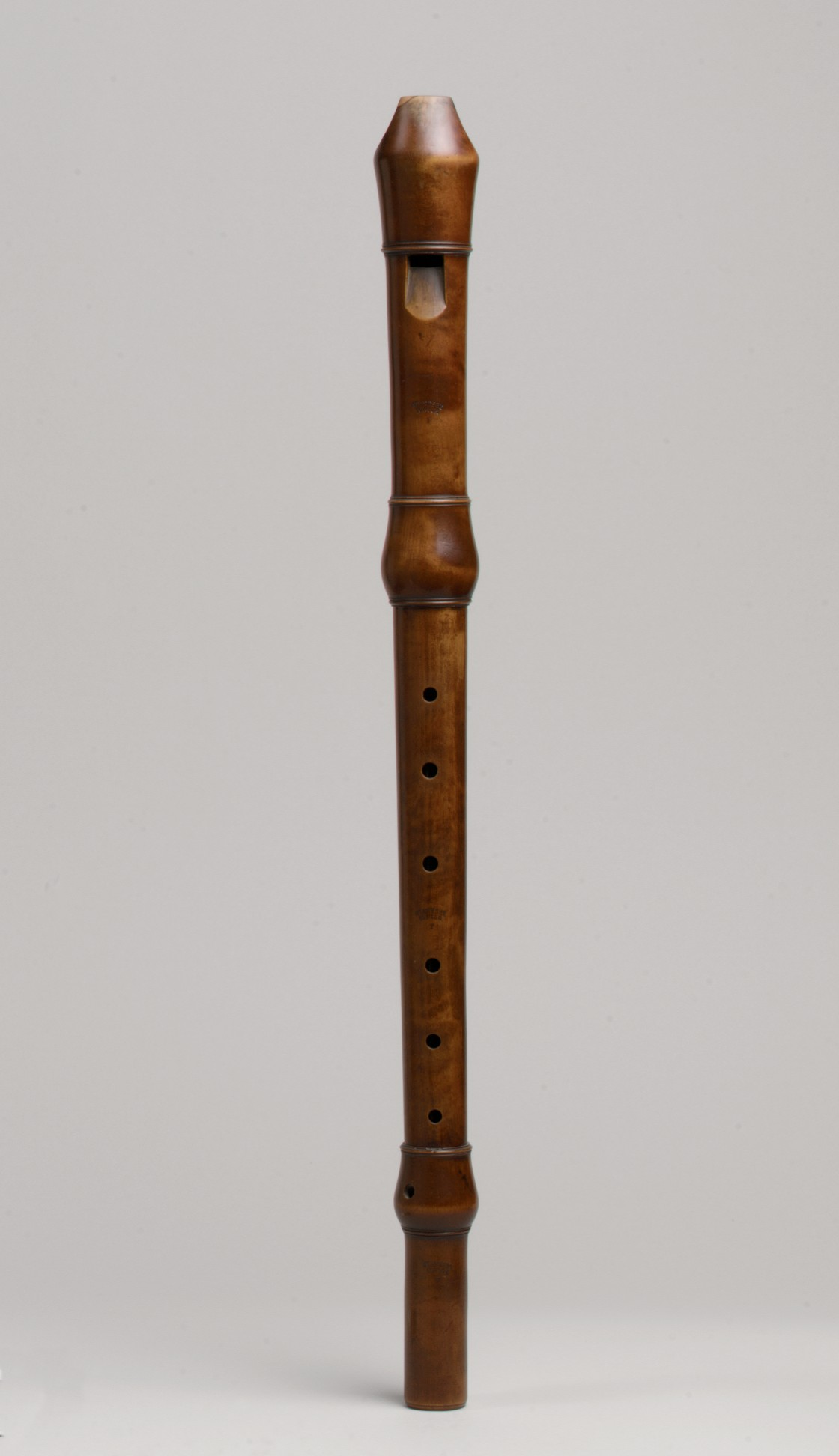
Alto recorder in F by Thomas Stanesby Jr. (mid-18th century, The Metropolitan Museum of Art, London).

Thomas Stanesby Sr. (c.1668–1734) and Thomas Stanesby Jr. (1692–1754) were English oboe, flute, bassoon and recorder-makers of the 18th century. Many of their instruments survive in museum collections around the world, and are widely copied by instrument makers of the present day.
