= Fred Morgan (recorder maker) =

Australian recorder maker

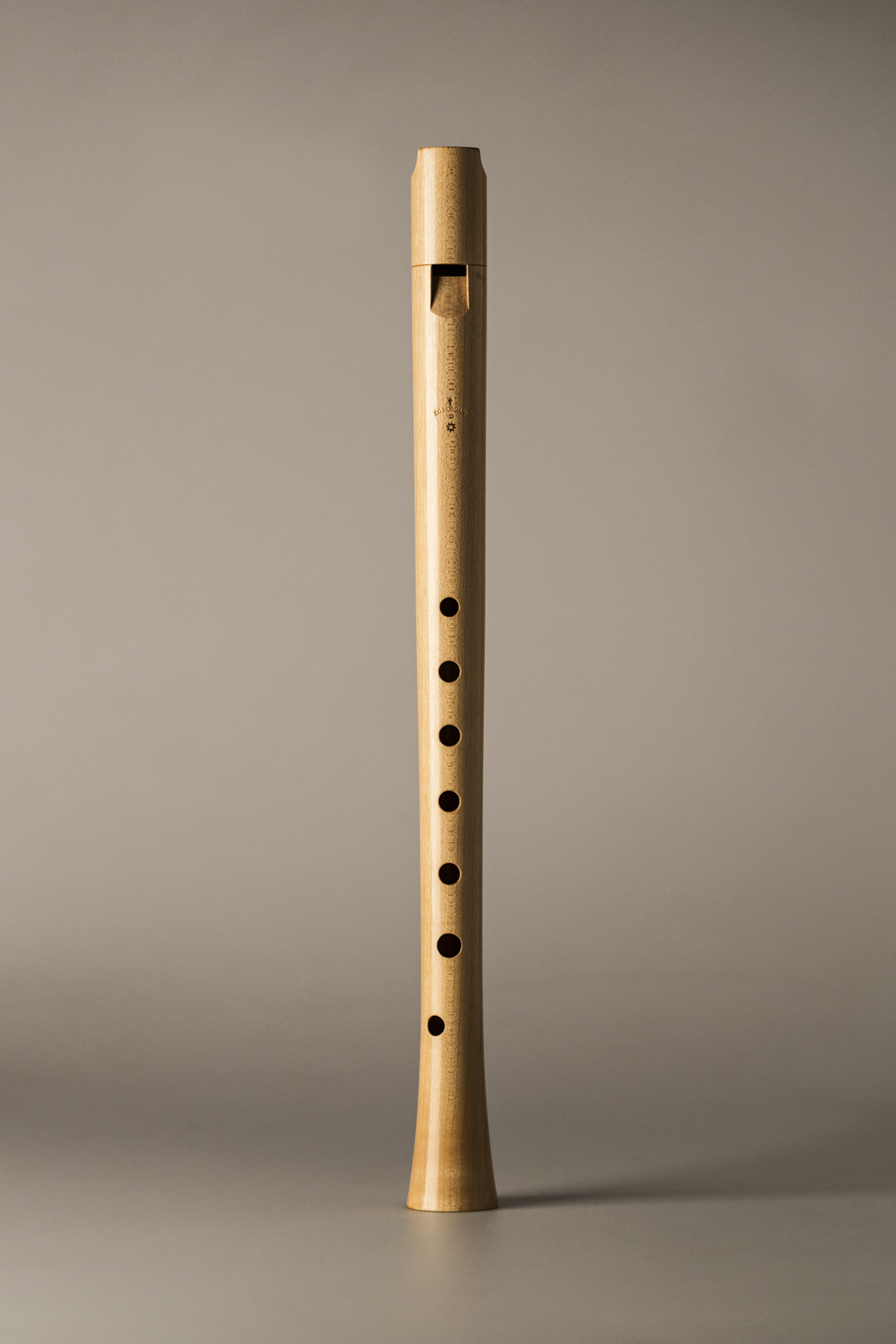
- Ganassi type alto recorder by Morgan
- Born: 8 April 1940
- Died: 16 April 1999 (aged 59)
- Occupation: Recorder maker
- Spouse(s): Jan Morgan (nee Wright), Ann Murphy
- Children: Sally, Ben and Finn
- Parent(s): Frank and Violet Morgan

Frederick G. Morgan (8 April 1940 - 16 April 1999) was an Australian recorder maker.

== Life and career ==
Morgan first played recorder at age 12 in the family's home in Mentone, Victoria, Australia. After studying commercial art at Melbourne Technical College in 1959, he went to work at the Pan Recorder factory where he became enamored with the recorder.

The Frederick Morgan Recorder Consort performed between 1964 and 1969, often accompanied on keyboard by his first wife, Jan. He appeared in the Melbourne Bach Festival, with the Tudor Choristers and the Melbourne Chorale. With Carl Dolmetsch and the Paul McDermott String Quartet, he performed Bach's Fourth Brandenburg Concerto in 1966 at Wilson Hall, Melbourne University. He continued to perform into 1970s with his second wife Ann Murphy, a harpsichordist.

He won a Churchill Fellowship to study Recorder Manufacture and Usage in Europe in 1970. There he studied instruments in museums and private collections and met the recorder virtuoso Frans Brüggen, who purchased a Morgan recorder in 1973. When Frans toured Australia with his Orchestra of the Eighteenth Century in 1985, they performed on original instruments from the 17th and 18th centuries, except for Frans who performed on his Morgan recorder.

Morgan set up a workshop in Amsterdam in 1978, but returned to Daylesford, Victoria in 1980. His instruments became much sought after and treasured by performers around the world. He is particularly noted for his role in developing the Ganassi recorder, and documenting the 17th century recorders found in the Rosenborg Castle in Denmark.

Morgan died in a car accident in 1999, but his workshop continues to produce partially finished bodies to be finished by other recorder makers, including Nikolaj Ronimus and Jacqueline Sorel. Mollenhauer has licensed the name to be used with their Morgan Denner series of altos.
