= Recorder (musical instrument) =

Woodwind instrument

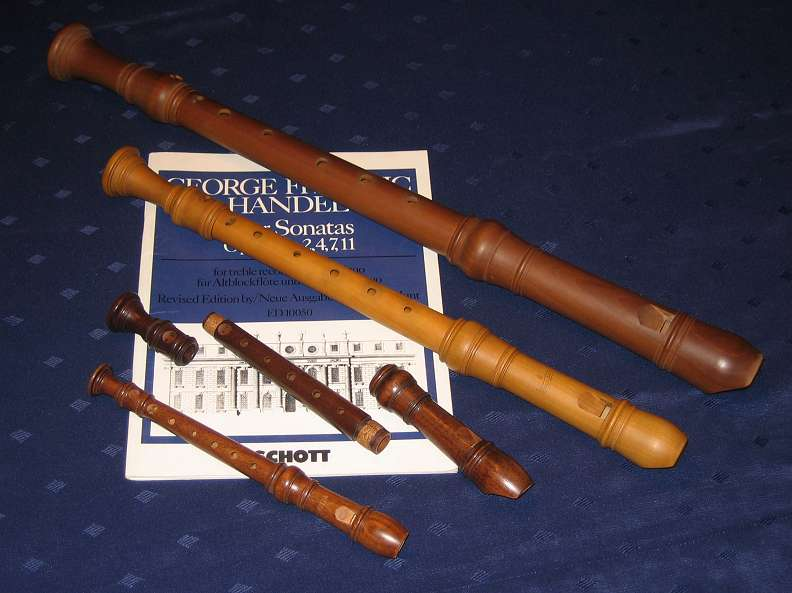
- Various recorders (second from the bottom disassembled into its three parts)

Woodwind instrument
- Other names: See § Other languages
- Classification: Wind; Woodwind; Aerophone
- Hornbostel–Sachs classification: 421.221.12 (Flute with internal duct and finger holes)

Playing range
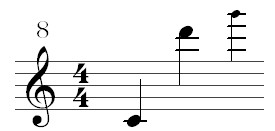
- Soprano recorder: C_{5}–D_{7}(G_{7})

Related instruments
- Tin whistle; Flageolet; Csakan; Three-hole pipe

Musicians
- Recorder players

The recorder is a family of woodwind musical instruments and a member of the family of duct flutes that includes tin whistles and flageolets. It is the most prominent duct flute in the western classical tradition. A recorder can be distinguished from other duct flutes by the presence of a thumb-hole for the upper hand and holes for seven fingers: three for the upper hand and four for the lower.

Recorders are made in various sizes and ranges. The sizes most commonly in use today are the soprano (also known as descant, lowest note C_{5}), alto (also known as treble, lowest note F_{4}), tenor (lowest note C_{4}), and bass (lowest note F_{3}). Recorders were traditionally constructed from wood or ivory. Modern professional instruments are wooden, often boxwood; student and scholastic recorders are commonly made of moulded plastic. The recorders' internal and external proportions vary, but the bore is generally reverse conical (i.e. tapering towards the foot) to cylindrical, and all recorder fingering systems make extensive use of forked fingerings.

The recorder is first documented in Europe in the Middle Ages, and continued to enjoy wide popularity in the Renaissance and Baroque periods, but was little used in the Classical and Romantic periods. It was revived in the twentieth century as part of the historically informed performance movement, and became a popular amateur and educational instrument. Composers who have written for the recorder include Monteverdi, Lully, Purcell, Handel, Vivaldi, Telemann, Bach, Hindemith, and Berio. There are many professional recorder players who demonstrate the full solo range of the instrument, and a large community of amateurs.

The sound of the recorder is often described as clear and sweet, and has historically been associated with birds and shepherds. It is notable for its quick response and its corresponding ability to produce a wide variety of articulations. This ability, coupled with its open finger holes, allow it to produce a wide variety of tone colours and special effects. Acoustically, its tone is relatively pure and, when the edge is positioned in the centre of the airjet, odd harmonics predominate in its sound (when the edge is decidedly off-center, an even distribution of harmonics occurs).

== Name ==
The instrument has been known by its modern English name since the fourteenth century. David Lasocki reports the earliest use of "recorder" in the household accounts of the Earl of Derby (later King Henry IV) in 1388, which register i. fistula nomine Recordour (1. a pipe called a 'Recorder').

By the fifteenth century, the name had appeared in English literature. The earliest references are in John Lydgate's Temple of Glas (c. 1430): These lytylle herdegromys Floutyn al the longe day..In here smale recorderys, In floutys. ('These little shepherds fluting all day long ... on their small recorders, on flutes.') and in Lydgate's Fall of Princes (c. 1431–1438): Pan, god off Kynde, with his pipes seuene, / Off recorderis fond first the melodies. ('Pan, god of Nature, with his pipes seven, / of recorders found first the melodies.')

=== Etymology ===
Appending the name recorder to the instrument itself is uniquely English: In Middle-French there is no equivalent noun sense of recorder referring to a musical instrument. The English verb record (from Middle-French recorder, early thirteenth century) meant "to learn by heart, to commit to memory, to go over in one's mind, to recite"; but the term did not refer to playing music until the sixteenth century. It was long after the English recorder was so-named that it gained two additional meanings: "silently practicing a tune", or "sing or render in song"—both referring almost-exclusively to songbirds.

Partridge indicates that the use of the instrument by jongleurs led to its association with the verb: Recorder the minstrel's action, a recorder the minstrel's tool. The reason is uncertain why this flute instrument—rather than some other instrument played by the jongleurs—is known as the recorder.

=== Flute and recorder ===
The introduction of the Baroque recorder to England by a group of French professionals in 1673 popularised the French name for the instrument, flute douce, or simply flute, a name previously (and subsequently) reserved for the transverse instrument. Until about 1695, the names recorder and flute overlapped, but from 1673 to the late 1720s in England, the word flute always meant recorder. In the 1720s, as the transverse flute overtook the recorder in popularity, English adopted the convention already present in other European languages of qualifying the word flute, calling the recorder variously the "common flute", "common English flute", or simply "English flute", while the transverse instrument was distinguished as the "German flute" or simply "flute". Until at least 1765, some writers still used flute to mean recorder.

=== Other languages ===
Until the mid-eighteenth century, musical scores written in Italian refer to the instrument as flauto, whereas the transverse instrument was called flauto traverso. This distinction, like the English switch from recorder to flute, has caused confusion among modern editors, writers and performers.

Indeed, in most European languages, the first term for the recorder was the word for flute alone. In the present day, cognates of the word flute, when used without qualifiers, remain ambiguous and may refer to either the recorder, the modern concert flute, or other non-western flutes. Starting in the 1530s, these languages began to add qualifiers to specify this particular flute.

== Nomenclature ==
Since the fifteenth century, a variety of sizes of recorder have been documented, but a consistent terminology and notation for the different sizes was not formulated until the twentieth century.

=== Modern recorders ===
Today, recorder sizes are named after the different vocal ranges. This is not, however, a reflection of sounding pitch, and serves primarily to denote the pitch relationships between the different instruments. Groups of recorders played together are referred to as "consorts". Recorders are also often referred to by their lowest sounding note: "recorder in F" refers to a recorder with lowest note F, in any octave.

The table in this section shows the standard names of modern recorders in F and C and their respective ranges. Music composed after the modern revival of the recorder most frequently uses soprano, alto, tenor, and bass recorders, although sopranino and great bass are also fairly common. Consorts of recorders are often referred to using the terminology of organ registers: 8′ (8 foot) pitch referring to a consort sounding as written, 4′ pitch a consort sounding an octave above written, and 16′ a consort sounding an octave below written. The combination of these consorts is also possible.

Ranges of the modern recorder family
In C	Written	Sounding	In F	Written	Sounding
Garklein flutlein or sopranissimo or piccolo in C_{6} (c‴)			Sopranino in F_{5} (f″)		
Soprano or descant in C_{5} (c″)			Alto or treble in F_{4} (f′)		
Tenor in C_{4} (c′)			Bass or basset in F_{3} (f)		
(Great) bass or quart-bass in C_{3} (c)			Contrabass or great bass or sub-bass in F_{2} (F)		
Sub-great bass or contra-great bass or contrabass in C_{2} (C)			Subcontrabass or double contrabass (Octocontrabass) in F_{1} (FF)		
Sub-sub-great bass in C_{1} (CC)					

As a rule of thumb, the tessitura of a baroque recorder lies approximately one octave above the tessitura of the human voice type after which it is named. For example, the tessitura of a soprano voice is roughly C_{4}–C_{6}, while the tessitura of a soprano recorder is C_{5}–C_{7}.

Modern variations include standard British terminology, due to Arnold Dolmetsch, which refers to the recorder in C_{5} (soprano) as the descant and the recorder in F_{4} (alto) as the treble. As conventions and instruments vary, especially for larger and more uncommon instruments, it is often practical to state the recorder's lowest note along with its name to avoid confusion.

==== Notation ====
Modern recorder parts are notated in the key they sound in. Parts for alto, tenor and contrabass recorders are notated at pitch, while parts for sopranino, soprano, bass, and great bass are typically notated an octave below their sounding pitch. As a result, soprano and tenor recorders are notated identically; alto and sopranino are notated identically; and bass and contrabass recorders are notated identically. Octave clefs may be used to indicate the sounding pitch, but usage is inconsistent.

Rare sizes and notations include the garklein flutlein, which may be notated two octaves below its sounding pitch, and the sub-contrabass, which may be notated an octave above its sounding pitch.

=== Historical recorders ===
The earliest known document mentioning "a pipe called Recordour" dates from 1388. Historically, recorders were used to play vocal music and parts written for other instruments, or for a general instrument. As a result, it was frequently the performers' responsibility to read parts not specifically intended for the instrument and to choose appropriate instruments. When such consorts consisted only of recorders, the pitch relationships between the parts were typically preserved, but when recorders were combined with other instruments, octave discrepancies were often ignored.

Recorder consorts in the sixteenth century were tuned in fifths and only occasionally employed tuning by octaves as seen in the modern C, F recorder consort. This means that consorts could be composed of instruments nominally in B♭, F, C, G, D, A and even E, although typically only three or four distinct sizes were used simultaneously. To use modern terminology, these recorders were treated as transposing instruments: consorts would be read identically to a consort made up of F_{3}, C_{4}, and G_{4} instruments. This is made possible by the fact that adjacent sizes are separated by fifths, with few exceptions. These parts would be written using chiavi naturali, allowing the parts to roughly fit in the range of a single staff, and also in the range of the recorders of the period. (see Renaissance structure)

Transpositions ("registers"), such as C_{3}–G_{3}–D_{4}, G_{3}–D_{4}–A_{4}, or B♭_{2}–F_{3}–C_{4}, all read as F_{3}–C_{4}–G_{4} instruments, were possible as described by Praetorius in his Syntagma Musicum. Three sizes of instruments could be used to play four-part music by doubling the middle size, e.g. F_{3}–C_{4}–C_{4}–G_{4}, or play six-part music by doubling the upper size and tripling the middle size, e.g. F_{3}–C_{4}–C_{4}–C_{4}–G_{4}–G_{4}. Modern nomenclature for such recorders refers to the instruments' relationship to the other members of consort, rather than their absolute pitch, which may vary. The instruments from lowest to highest are called "great bass", "bass", "basset", "tenor", "alto", and "soprano". Potential sizes include: great bass in F_{2}; bass in B♭_{2} or C_{3}; basset in F_{3} or G_{3}; tenor in B♭_{3}, C_{4} or D_{4}; alto in F_{4}, G_{4} or A_{4}; and soprano in C_{5} or D_{5}.

The alto in F_{4} is the standard recorder of the Baroque, although there is a small repertoire written for other sizes. In seventeenth-century England, smaller recorders were named for their relationship to the alto and notated as transposing instruments with respect to it: third flute (A_{4}), fifth flute (soprano; C_{5}), sixth flute (D_{5}), and octave flute (sopranino; F_{5}). The term flute du quart, or fourth flute (B♭_{4}), was used by Charles Dieupart, although curiously he treated it as a transposing instrument in relation to the soprano rather than the alto. In Germanic countries, the equivalent of the same term, Quartflöte, was applied both to the tenor in C_{4}, the interval being measured down from the alto in F_{4}, and to a recorder in C_{5} (soprano), the interval of a fourth apparently being measured up from an alto in G_{4}. Recorder parts in the Baroque were typically notated using the treble clef, although they may also be notated in French violin clef (G clef on the bottom line of the staff).

In modern usage, recorders not in C or F are alternatively referred to using the name of the closest instrument in C or F, followed by the lowest note. For example, a recorder with lowest note G_{4} may be known as a G-alto or alto in G, a recorder with lowest note D_{5} (also "sixth flute") as a D-soprano or soprano in D, and a recorder in G_{3} as a G-bass or G-basset. This usage is not totally consistent. Notably, the baroque recorder in D_{4} is not commonly referred to as a D-tenor nor a D-alto; it is most commonly referred to using the historical name "voice flute".

== Structure ==
=== Materials ===
Some hardwoods used to make recorders
- maplewood (Acer pseudoplatanus, specific gravity 0.63)
- pearwood (Pyrus communis, specific gravity 0.65),
- plumwood (Prunus domestica, specific gravity 0.79),
- Castello "boxwood" (Calycophyllum multiflorum, specific gravity 0.8),
- Zapatero "boxwood" (Gossypiospermum praecox, specific gravity 0.8),
- olivewood (Olea europaea, specific gravity 0.85),
- European boxwood (Buxus sempervirens, specific gravity 0.95),
- rosewood (including tulipwood (Dalbergia decipularis, specific gravity 0.95),
- palisander (Dalbergia retusa, specific gravity 1.05),
- kingwood (Dalbergia cearensis, specific gravity 1.2), etc.),
- ebony (Diospyros perrieri, specific gravity 1.1), or
- grenadilla (Dalbergia melanoxylon, specific gravity 1.2)

Recorders have historically been constructed from hardwoods and ivory, sometimes with metal tone keys. Since the modern revival of the recorder, plastics have been used in the mass manufacture of recorders, as well as by a few individual makers.

Today, a wide variety of hardwoods are used to make recorder bodies. Relatively fewer varieties of wood are used to make recorder blocks, which are often made of red cedar, chosen because of its rot resistance, ability to absorb water, and low expansion when wet. A recent innovation is the use of synthetic ceramics in the manufacture of recorder blocks. Instruments fitted with this device were marketed by Moeck in the 1970s.

=== Larger recorders ===
Some recorders have tone holes too far apart for a player's hands to reach, or too large to cover with the pads of the fingers. In either case, more ergonomically placed keys can be used to cover the tone holes. Keys also allow the design of longer instruments with larger tone holes. Keys are most common in recorders larger than the alto. Instruments larger than the tenor need at least one key so the player can cover all eight holes. Keys are sometimes also used on smaller recorders to allow for comfortable hand stretch, and acoustically improved hole placement and size.

When playing a larger recorder, a player may not be able to simultaneously reach the keys or tone holes with the fingers and reach the windway with the mouth. In this case, a bocal may be used to allow the player to blow into the recorder while maintaining a comfortable hand position. Alternatively, some recorders have a bent bore that positions the windway closer to the keys or finger holes so the player can comfortably reach both. Instruments with a single bend are known as "knick" or bent-neck recorders.

=== Modern developments ===
Some newer designs of recorder are now being produced. Recorders with a square cross-section may be produced more cheaply and in larger sizes than comparable recorders manufactured by turning. Another area is the development of instruments with a greater dynamic range and more powerful bottom notes. These modern designs make it easier to be heard in concertos. Finally, recorders with a downward extension of a semitone are becoming available; such instruments can play a full three octaves in tune.

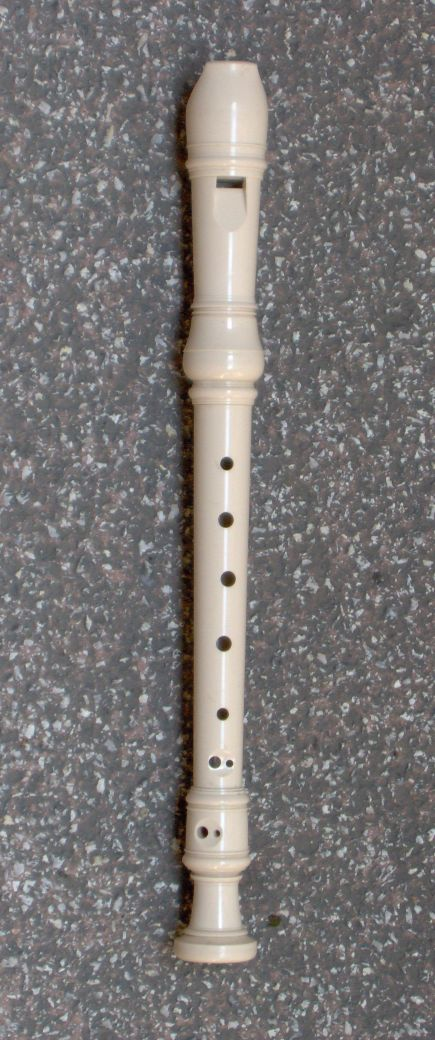
Recorder with German fingering. Note that the 4th finger-hole is larger than the 5th.

=== German fingering ===
In the early twentieth century, Peter Harlan developed a recorder with apparently simpler fingering, called German fingering. A recorder designed for German fingering has a hole five that is smaller than hole four, whereas baroque and neo-baroque recorders have a hole four that is smaller than hole five. The immediate difference in fingering is for F (soprano) or B♭ (alto), which on a neo-baroque instrument must be fingered 0 123 4–67. With German fingering, this becomes a simpler 0 123 4 – – –. Unfortunately, however, this makes many other chromatic notes too out of tune to be usable. German fingering became popular in Europe, especially Germany, in the 1930s, but rapidly became obsolete in the 1950s as people began to treat the recorder more seriously, and the limitations of German fingering became more widely appreciated. Recorders with German fingering are today manufactured exclusively for educational purposes.

=== Pitch ===
Modern recorders are most commonly pitched at A=440 Hz, but among serious amateurs and professionals, other pitch standards are often found. For the performance of baroque music, A=415 Hz is the de facto standard, while pre-Baroque music is often performed at A=440 Hz or A=466 Hz. These pitch standards are intended to reflect the broad variation in pitch standards throughout the history of the recorder. In various regions, contexts, and time periods, pitch standards have varied from A=~392 Hz to A=~520 Hz. The pitches A=415 Hz and A=466 Hz, a semitone lower and a semitone higher than A=440 Hz respectively, were chosen because they may be used with harpsichords or chamber organs that transpose up or down a semitone from A=440. These pitch standards allow recorder players to collaborate with other instrumentalists at a pitch other than A=440 Hz.

Some recorder makers produce instruments at pitches other than the three standard pitches above, and recorders with interchangeable bodies at different pitches.

== Acoustics ==
Cross-section of the head of a recorder. A) block B) windway C) labium

=== Basic sound production ===
The recorder produces sound in the manner of a whistle or an organ flue pipe. In normal play, the player blows into the windway (B), a narrow channel in the head joint, which directs a stream of air across a gap called the window, at a sharp edge called the labium (C). The air stream alternately travels above and below the labium, exciting standing waves in the bore of the recorder, and producing sound waves that emanate away from the window. Feedback from the resonance of the tube regulates the pitch of the sound.

In recorders, as in all woodwind instruments, the air column inside the instrument behaves like a vibrating string, to use a musical analogy, and has multiple modes of vibration. These waves produced inside the instrument are not travelling waves, like those the ear perceives as sound, but rather stationary standing waves consisting of areas of high pressure and low pressure inside the tube, called nodes. The perceived pitch is the lowest, and typically loudest, mode of vibration in the air column. The other pitches are harmonics, or overtones. Players typically describe recorder pitches by the number of nodes in the air column. Notes with a single node are in the first register, notes with two nodes in the second register, etc. As the number of nodes in the tube increases, the number of notes a player can produce in a given register decreases because of the physical constraint of the spacing of the nodes in the bore. On a Baroque recorder, the first, second, and third registers span about a major ninth, a major sixth, and a minor third respectively.

=== Harmonic profile ===
The recorder sound, for the most part, lacks high harmonics and odd harmonics predominate in its sound with the even harmonics being almost entirely absent, although the harmonic profile of the recorder sound varies from recorder to recorder, and from fingering to fingering. As a result of the lack of high harmonics, writers since Praetorius have remarked that it is difficult for the human ear to perceive correctly the sounding octave of the recorder.

==== Air ====
As in organ flue pipes, the sounding pitch of duct type whistles is affected by the velocity of the air stream as it impinges upon the labium. The pitch generally increases with velocity of the airstream, up to a point.

Air speed can also be used to influence the number of pressure nodes in a process called over blowing. At higher airstream velocities, lower modes of vibration of the air column become unstable, resulting in a change of register.

The air stream is affected by the shaping of the surfaces in the head of the recorder (the "voicing"), and the way the player blows air into the windway. Recorder voicing is determined by physical parameters such as the proportions and curvature of the windway along both the longitudinal and latitudinal axes, the bevelled edges (chamfers) of the windway facing towards the labium, the length of the window, the sharpness of the labium (i.e. the steepness of the ramp) among other parameters. The player is able to control the speed and turbulence of the airstream using the diaphragm and vocal tract.

==== Fingers ====
The finger holes, used in combination or partially covered, affect the sounding pitch of the instrument.

At the most basic level, the sequential uncovering of finger holes increases the sounding pitch of the instrument by decreasing the effective sounding length of the instrument, and vice versa for the sequential covering of holes. In the fingering 01234567, only the bell of the instrument is open, resulting in a low pressure node at the bell end of the instrument. The fingering 0123456 sounds at a higher pitch because the seventh hole and the bell both release air, creating a low pressure node at the seventh hole.

Besides sequential uncovering, recorders can use forked fingering to produce tones other than those produced by simple sequential lifting of fingers. In the fingering 0123, air leaks from the open holes 4,5,6, and 7. The pressure inside the bore is higher at the fourth hole than at the fifth, and decreases further at the 6th and 7th holes. Consequently, the most air leaks from the fourth hole and the least air leaks from the seventh hole. As a result, covering the fourth hole affects the pitch more than covering any of the holes below it. Thus, at the same air pressure, the fingering 01235 produces a pitch between 0123 and 01234. Forked fingerings allow recorder players to obtain fine gradations in pitch and timbre.

A recorder's pitch is also affected by the partial covering of holes. This technique is an important tool for intonation, and is related to the fixed process of tuning a recorder, which involves the adjustment of the size and shape of the finger holes through carving and the application of wax.

One essential use of partial covering is in "leaking", or partially covering, the thumb hole to destabilise low harmonics. This allows higher harmonics to sound at lower air pressures than by over-blowing alone, as on simple whistles. The player may also leak other holes to destabilise lower harmonics in place of the thumb hole (hole 0). This technique is demonstrated in the fingering tables of Ganassi's Fontegara (1535), which illustrate the simultaneous leaking of holes 0, 2, and 5 to produce some high notes. For example, Ganassi's table produces the 15th (third octave tonic) as the fourth harmonic of the tonic, leaking holes 0, 2 and 5 and produces the 16th as the third harmonic of the fifth, leaking holes 0 and 2. On some Baroque recorders, the 17th can be produced as the third harmonic of the sixth, leaking hole 0 as well as hole 1, 2 or both.

== Technique ==
Although the design of the recorder has changed over its 700-year history, notably in fingering and bore profile (see History), the technique of playing recorders of different sizes and periods is much the same. Indeed, much of what is known about the technique of playing the recorder is derived from historical treatises and manuals dating from the sixteenth to eighteenth centuries. The following describes the commonalities of recorder technique across all time periods.

=== Playing position ===
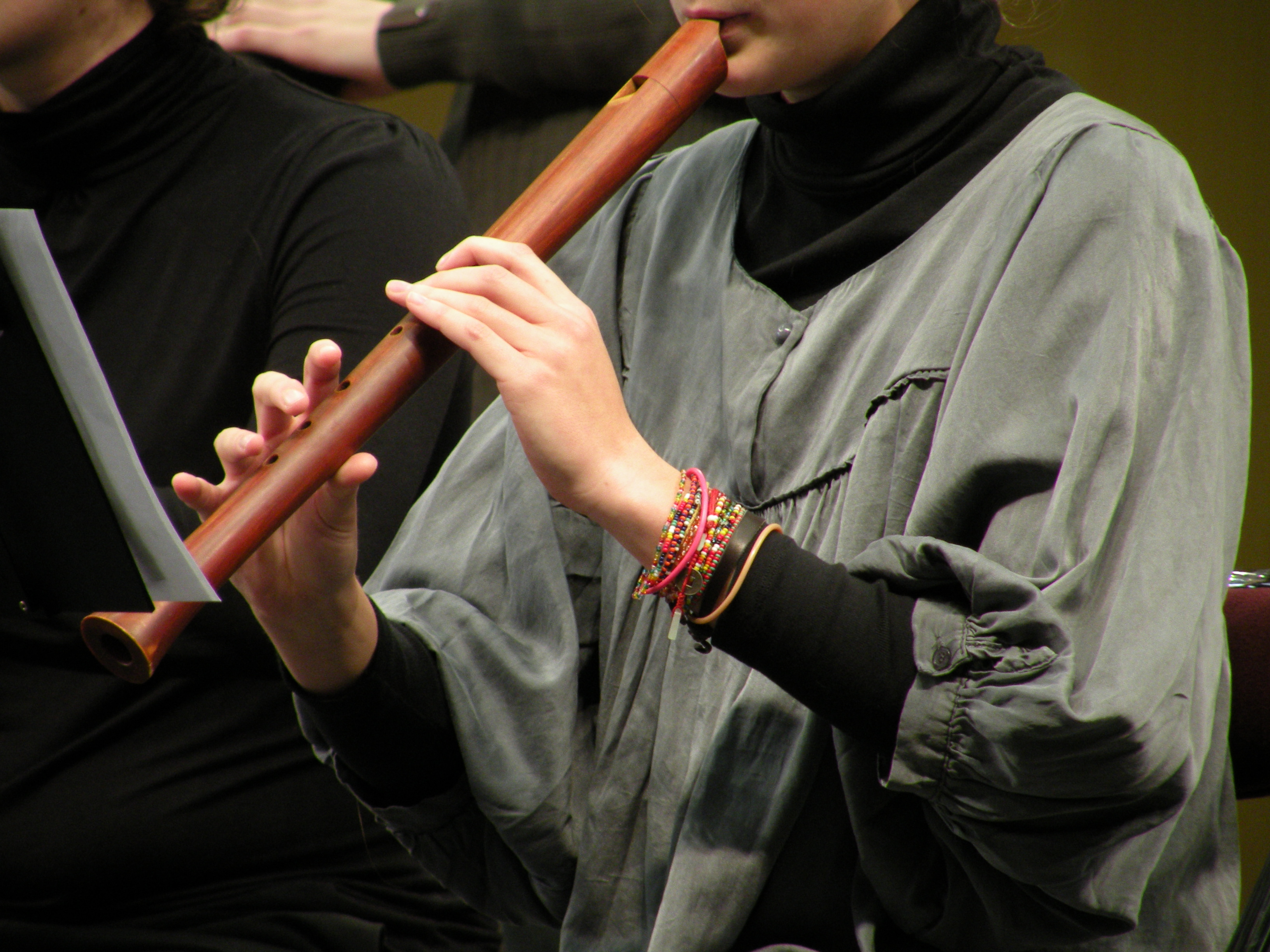
A musician playing a recorder.

In normal playing position, the recorder is held with both hands, covering the finger holes or depressing the keys with the pads of the fingers: four fingers on the lower hand; and the index, middle, and ring fingers and thumb on the upper hand. In standard modern practice, the right hand is the lower hand, while the left hand is the upper hand, although this was not standardized before the modern revival of the recorder.

The recorder is supported by the lips, which loosely seal around the beak of the instrument, the thumb of the lower hand, and, depending on the note fingered, by the other fingers and the upper thumb. A practice documented in many historical fingering charts is the use of finger seven or eight to support the recorder when playing notes for which the coverage of this hole negligibly affects the sounding pitch (e.g., notes with many holes uncovered). Larger recorders may have a thumb rest, or a neck strap for extra support, and can use a bocal to direct air from the player's mouth to the windway.

Recorders are typically held at an angle between vertical and horizontal, the attitude depending on the size and weight of the recorder, and personal preference.

=== Fingers ===
How the fingers and holes are numbered
Fingers	Holes

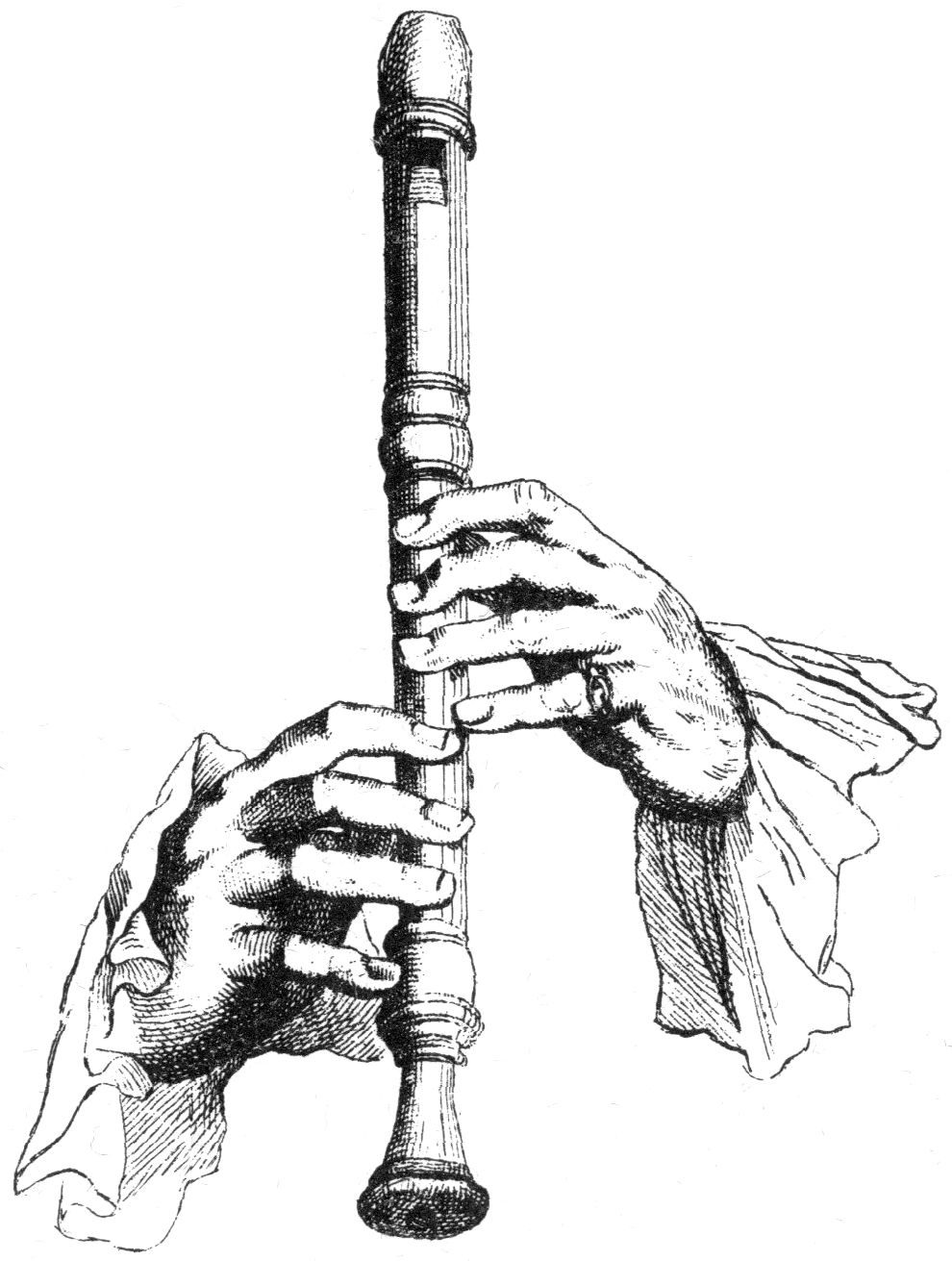
Illustration of a man playing a recorder, from Jacques Hotteterre, Principes de la Flute Traversiere, de la Flute a Bec, et du Haut-bois(1707).

Pitches are produced on the recorder by covering the holes while blowing into the instrument. Modern terminology refers to the holes on the front of the instrument using the numbers 1 through 7, starting with the hole closest to the beak, with the thumbhole numbered hole 0. At the most basic level, the fingering technique of the recorder involves the sequential uncovering of the holes from lowest to highest (i.e., uncovering 7, then uncovering 7 and 6, then uncovering 7, 6, and 5, etc.) producing even higher pitches. In practice, however, the uncovering of the holes is not strictly sequential, and the half covering or uncovering of holes is an essential part of recorder technique.

==== Forked fingerings ====
A forked fingering is a fingering in which an open hole has covered holes below it: fingerings for which the uncovering of the holes is not sequential. For example, the fingering 0123 (G_{5}) is not a forked fingering, while 0123 56 (F♯_{5}) is a forked fingering because the open hole 4 has holes covered below it – holes 5 and 6. Forked fingerings allow for smaller adjustments in pitch than the sequential uncovering of holes alone would allow. For example, at the same air speed the fingering 0123 5 sounds higher than 01234 but lower than 0123. Many standard recorder fingerings are forked fingerings. Forked fingerings may also be used to produce microtonal variations in pitch.

Forked fingerings have a different harmonic profile from non-forked fingerings, and are generally regarded as having a weaker sound. Forked fingerings that have a different tone colour or are slightly sharp or flat can provide so-called "alternate fingerings". For example, the fingering 0123 has a slightly sharper forked variant 012 4567.

==== Partial covering of holes ====
Partial covering of the holes is an essential part of the playing technique of all recorders. This is variously known as "leaking", "shading", "half-holing", and in the context of the thumb hole, "pinching".

The primary function of the thumbhole is to serve as an octaving vent. When it is leaked, the first mode of vibration of the air column becomes unstable: i.e., the register changes. In most recorders, this is required for the playing of every note higher than a ninth above the lowest note. The player must adjust the position of the thumb for these notes to sound stable and in tune.

The partial opening of the thumbhole may be achieved by sliding or rolling the thumb off the hole, or by bending the thumb at the first knuckle. To partially uncover a covered hole, the player may slide the finger off the hole, bend or roll the finger away from the hole, gently lift the finger from the hole, or a combination of these. To partially cover an open hole, the reverse is possible.

Generally speaking, the partial opening of covered finger holes raises the pitch of the sounding note while the partial closure of open finger holes lowers the pitch.

==== Holes 6 and 7 ====
On most models of "baroque" modern recorders, the lower two fingers of the lower hand actually cover two holes each (called "double holes"). Whereas on the vast majority of baroque recorders and all earlier recorders these two fingers covered a single hole ("single holes"), double holes have become standard for baroque modelled modern recorders.

By covering one or both of these two, smaller holes, a recorder player can play the notes a semitone above the lowest note and a minor third above the lowest note, notes that are possible on single holed recorders only through the partial covering of those holes, or the covering of the bell.

==== Covering the bell ====
The open end of the bore facing away from the player (the "bell") may be covered to produce extra notes or effects. Because both hands are typically engaged in holding the recorder or covering the finger holes, the covering of the bell is normally achieved by bringing the end of the recorder in contact with the leg or knee, typically achieved through a combination of bending of the torso and/or raising of the knee. Alternatively, in rare cases instruments may be equipped with a key designed to cover the bell ("bell key"), operated by one of the fingers, typically the pinky finger of the upper hand, which is not normally used to cover a hole. Fingerings with a covered bell extend the recorder's chromatic playable range above and below the nominal fingered range.

=== Air ===
The pitch and volume of the recorder sound are influenced by the speed of the air travelling through the windway, which may be controlled by varying the breath pressure and the shape of the vocal tract. The sound is also affected by the turbulence of the air entering the recorder. Generally speaking, faster air in the windway produces a higher pitch. Thus blowing harder causes a note to sound sharp whereas blowing the note gently causes it to sound flat. Knowledge of this fact and the recorder's individual tonal differences over its full range will help recorders play in tune with other instruments by knowing which notes will need slightly more or less air to stay in tune. As mentioned above at Harmonic profile, blowing much harder can result in overblowing.

==== Breath ====
The technique of inhalation and exhalation for the recorder differs from that of many other wind instruments in that the recorder requires very little air pressure to produce a sound, unlike reed or brasswind instruments.

Thus, it is often necessary for a recorder player to produce long, controlled streams of air at a very low pressure. Recorder breathing technique focuses on the controlled release of air rather than on maintaining diaphragmatic pressure.

==== Tongue, mouth and throat ====
The use of the tongue to stop and start the air is called "articulation". In this capacity, the tongue has two basic functions: to control the start of the note (the attack) and the end, or the length of the note (legato, staccato). Articulations are roughly analogous to consonants. Practically any consonant that may be produced with the tongue, mouth, and throat may be used to articulate on the recorder. Transliterations of common articulation patterns include "du du du du" (using the tip of the tongue, "single tonguing"), "du gu du gu" (alternating between the tip and the back of the tongue, "double tonguing"), and "du g'll du g'll" (articulation with the tip and the sides of the tongue, "triple tonguing"). The attack of the note is governed by such factors as the pressure buildup behind the tongue and shape of the articulant, while the length of the note governed by the stoppage of the air by the tongue. Each articulation pattern has a different natural pattern of attack and length, and recorder technique seeks to produce a wide variety of lengths and attacks using these articulation patterns. Patterns such as these have been used since at least the time of Ganassi (1535).

Mouth and throat shapes are roughly analogous to vowels. The shape of the vocal tract affects the velocity and turbulence of the air entering the recorder. The shape of the mouth and vocal tract is closely related to the consonant used to articulate.

=== Coordination ===
The player must coordinate fingers and tongue to align articulations with finger movements. In normal play, articulated attacks should align with the proper fingering, even in legato passages or in difficult finger transitions and the fingers move in the brief silence between the notes (silence d'articulation) created by the stoppage of the air by the tongue.

Both fingers and the breath can be used to control the pitch of the recorder. Coordinating the two is essential to playing the recorder in tune and with a variety of dynamics and timbres. On an elementary level, breath pressure and fingerings must accord with each other to provide an in-tune pitch. As an example of a more advanced form of coordination, a gradual increase in breath pressure combined with the shading of holes, when properly coordinated, results in an increase in volume and change in tone colour without a change in pitch. The reverse is possible, decreasing breath pressure and gradually lifting fingers.

=== Basic fingering ===
Recorder fingerings (English): Lowest note through the nominal range of 2 octaves and a sixth
Note		First octave								Second octave								Third octave								
Tuned (Note: See the section Types of recorder concerning recorders in C or in F.) in F	Tuned in C	Hole 0	Hole 1	Hole 2	Hole 3	Hole 4	Hole 5	Hole 6	Hole 7	Hole 0	Hole 1	Hole 2	Hole 3	Hole 4	Hole 5	Hole 6	Hole 7	Hole 0	Hole 1	Hole 2	Hole 3	Hole 4	Hole 5	Hole 6	Hole 7	End hole 8
F	C	●	●	●	●	●	●	●	●	●	○	●	○	○	○	○	○	◐	●	○	○	●	●	○	○	○
F♯/G♭	C♯/D♭	●	●	●	●	●	●	●	◐	○	●	●	○	○	○	○	○	◐	●	○	●	●	○	●	●	●
G	D	●	●	●	●	●	●	●	○	○	○	●	○	○	○	○	○	◐	●	○	●	●	○	●	● (Note: Some recorders may need this hole closed (●), half closed (◐), or open (○) to play the note in tune.)	○
G♯/A♭	D♯/E♭	●	●	●	●	●	●	◐	○	○	○	●	●	●	●	●	○	◐	○	●	●	○	●	●	○	○
A	E	●	●	●	●	●	●	○	○	◐	●	●	●	●	●	○	○	◐	○	●	●	○	●	●	○	●
A♯/B♭	F	●	●	●	●	●	○	●	●	◐	●	●	●	●	○	●	○	◐	●	●	○	●	●	○	○	●
B	F♯/G♭	●	●	●	●	○	●	●	○	◐	●	●	●	○	●	○	○	◐	●	●	○	●	●	○	○	○
C	G	●	●	●	●	○	○	○	○	◐	●	●	●	○	○	○	○	◐	●	○	○	●	○	○	○	○
C♯/D♭	G♯/A♭	●	●	●	○	●	●	◐	○	◐	●	●	○	●	○	○	○	◐	●	○	●	○	○	●	●	●
D	A	●	●	●	○	○	○	○	○	◐	●	●	○	○	○	○	○	◐	●	○	●	○	●	○	○	○
D♯/E♭	A♯/B♭	●	●	○	●	●	○	○	○	◐	●	●	○	●	●	●	○									
E	B	●	●	○	○	○	○	○	○	◐	●	●	○	●	●	○	○									

● means to cover the hole. ○ means to uncover the hole. ◐ means half-cover.

The range of a modern "baroque" model recorder is usually considered two octaves and a tone. See the table above for "English" fingerings for the standard range. The numbers at the top correspond to the fingers and the holes on the recorder. The vast majority of recorders manufactured today are designed to play using these fingerings, with slight variations. Nonetheless, recorder fingerings vary widely between models and are mutable even for a single recorder: recorder players may use three or more fingerings for the same note along with partial covering of the holes to achieve proper intonation, in coordination with the breath or in faster passages where some fingerings are unavailable. This chart is a general guide, but by no means a definitive or complete fingering chart for the recorder, an impossible task. Rather, it is the basis for a much more complex fingering system, which is still being added to today.

Some fonts show miniature glyphs of complete recorder fingering charts in TrueType format. Since Unicode does not have values for complete recorder fingering charts, these fonts are custom encoded.

== History ==
=== General ===
Duct flutes and recorders are found in almost every musical tradition around the world. The earliest extant duct flutes date to the Neolithic period. While classifying early instruments has proved controversial, recorders are typically distinguished from other duct flutes by the thumb hole—used as an octaving vent—and seven finger holes. The playing of the recorder in its earliest history is not well documented owing to the lack of surviving records from the time.

=== Middle Ages ===
==== Structure ====
Our present knowledge of the shape and structure of recorders in the Middle Ages is based on the few instruments now preserved, and on artworks, including iconography, from the period.

===== Surviving instruments =====
Recorders surviving from the Middle Ages are heterogeneous. The first instrument discovered is the "Dordrecht recorder". Made of fruitwood, it was excavated in 1940 from a well (not a moat) in the ruin of the Huis te Merwede ("House on the Merwede"), near the town of Dordrecht in the Netherlands. As the house was inhabited only from 1335 to 1418, and the site was not disturbed until the modern excavation, so the recorder has been dated to the period of occupation.

The instrument itself presents a cylindrical bore of diameter about 11 mm (0.43 in); and it is about 300 mm (12 in) long with a vibrating air column of about 270 mm (11 in). The block has survived but the labium is damaged, making the instrument unplayable. There are tenons on both ends of the instrument, suggesting the presence of ferrules (or turnings), now lost. Uncertainty about details of these fittings has hindered reconstruction of the instrument's original state.

A structurally different instrument (the "Göttingen recorder") was discovered in 1987 in an archaeological excavation of the latrine of a medieval house dated to between 1246 and 1322 in Göttingen, Germany. It is fruitwood of one piece with turnings measuring about 256 mm (10.1 in) long. It presents a cylindrical bore growing to 13.6 mm (0.54 in) at the second highest measurable point, then progressively narrowing to the seventh finger hole, before flaring again to 14.5 mm (0.57 in) at the bottom of the instrument, which has a bulbous foot. Unusually, the finger holes taper conically outwards, the opposite of the undercutting found in later Baroque recorders.

The top of the instrument is damaged; only a cut side of the windway survives and the block has been lost. A reconstruction model by Hans Reiners produces a strident, penetrating sound rich in overtones, and has a range of two octaves. With the thumb hole and the first three finger holes covered, the reconstruction produces a pitch of ca. 450 Hz.

More instruments and fragments dated to the medieval period have come to light in the 21st century. These include: a 14th century headjoint fragment excavated in Esslingen, Germany (the "Esslingen fragment"); a birch instrument dated to the second half of the 14th century, unearthed in Tartu, Estonia (the "Tartu recorder"); and the "Elbląg recorder", a fruitwood instrument dated to the 15th century, as found in Elbląg, Poland.

Common features of surviving instruments include: a narrow cylindrical bore (except the Göttingen recorder); a doubled seventh hole for the little finger of the lower hand, (except the Tartu recorder), which feature allows for both right- or left-handed playing; a flat or truncated head instead of the narrow beak found on later instruments; and a seventh hole that produces a semitone instead of a tone. Additionally, the Esslingen fragment has turnings similar to the Göttingen recorder. No complete instrument longer than 300 mm (12 in) has been uncovered, although the Esslingen fragment may represent a larger recorder.

The widely-spaced doubled seventh hole was problematic, and persisted into later instruments and later periods—the hole not used was plugged with wax, according to Virdung (1511). It was during the Baroque period that instruments with adjustable footjoints were developed, rendering the doubled holes obsolete.

Classifying duct flute instruments is further complicated by recorders with seventh holes that produce a semitone instead of a tone. Chromatic fingerings then are difficult, requiring extensive "half-holing". Such instruments share similarities with the six-holed flageolet, which used three fingers on each hand, but with no thumb hole. Anthony Rowland-Jones suggested the recorder's thumb hole was (intended as) an improvement over the flageolet, providing stronger fingering for the note one octave above the tonic, while the seventh finger hole provided a leading tone to the tonic. As a result, he suggests describing these flutes instead as improved flageolets, and proposes that true recorders should produce a full tone (rather than a semitone) when the seventh finger is lifted.

Controversies aside, these instruments very likely are, at least, precursors to later instruments that indisputably are duct flute recorders. Consensus is unlikely as there is sparse documentary evidence from the earliest history of the instrument. That maybe so; and yet, if you let the surviving half-dozen or so surviving medieval recorders speak for themselves you will observe that the lowest interval of most of them was a semitone. Historically, there was no need for an all-inclusive definition that encompassed every form of the instrument past and present. But we may find it useful to make such distinctions, today.

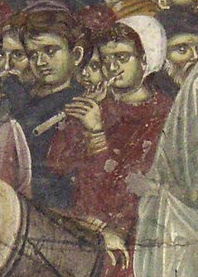
Detail of "The Mocking of Christ" painting in the Church of St. George in Staro Nagoričane, showing a recorder player.

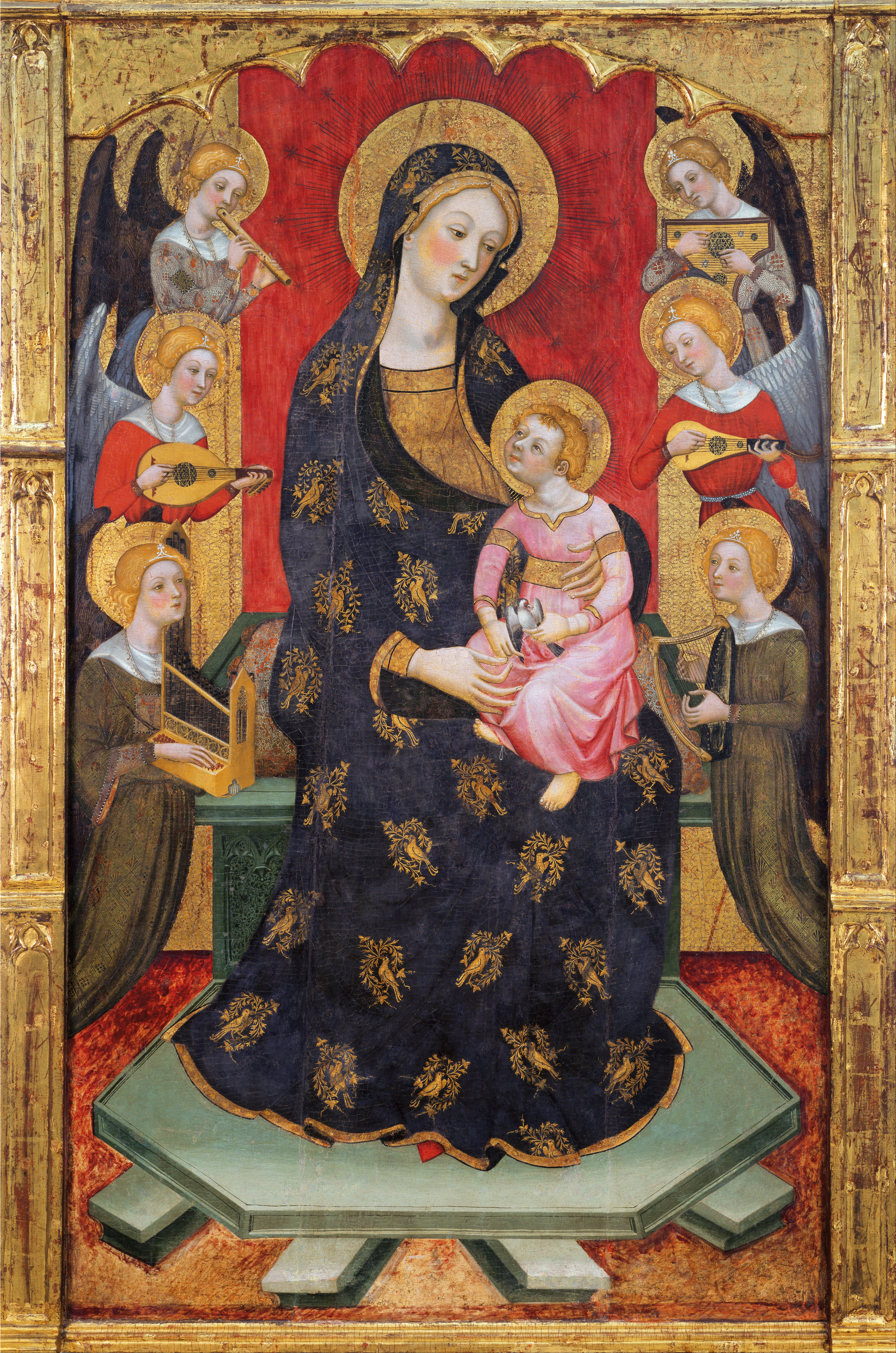
Pedro (Pere) Serra's "Virgin of the Angels"; the angel at the top left is playing a recorder.

===== Iconography =====
Recorders with a cylindrical profile are depicted in many medieval paintings; however, their representations appear stylised, and do not easily correspond to surviving instruments. The earliest depiction of the recorder is probably in "The Mocking of Christ", a painting from the monastery Church of St. George in Staro Nagoričane near Kumanovo, Macedonia, in which a man is playing a cylindrical recorder. (The painting of the church began in 1315.) And there is the "Virgin of the Angels" centre panel, attributed to Pedro (Pere) Serra (c. 1390), as painted for Tortosa Cathedral, Tortosa, Spain and now in the Museu Nacional d'Art de Catalunya, Barcelona—a group of angels gathered around the Virgin Mary, playing musical instruments, one of them playing a cylindrical recorder.

Starting in the Middle Ages, angels have frequently been depicted as playing one or more recorders, often grouped around the Virgin; and, in several notable paintings, trios of angels play recorders. Such is perhaps a sign of the Trinity, although perhaps of the music itself, which also was typically in three parts.

==== Repertoire ====
No music marked for the recorder survives from prior to 1500. Groups, particularly trios, of flutists playing recorders and of angels playing recorders, are depicted in paintings from the 15th century, indicating the recorder was used in these configurations and with other instruments. Some of the earliest music must have been vocal repertory.

Modern recorder players have taken up playing instrumental music, some anachronistically, from the period—such as the monophonic estampie works from the Chansonnier du Roi (13th century), the British Library's Add MS 29987 (14th or 15th century), or the Codex Faenza (15th century). And they have arranged keyboard music of the period for recorder ensembles, including the estampies from the Robertsbridge codex (14th century), or the vocal works of composers Guillaume de Machaut, Johannes Ciconia, and others.

=== Renaissance ===
In the sixteenth century, the structure, repertoire, and performing practice of the recorder is better documented than in prior epochs. The recorder was one of the most important wind instruments of the Renaissance, and many instruments dating to the sixteenth century survive, including some matched consorts. This period also produced the first extant books describing the recorder, including the treatises of Virdung (1511), Agricola (1529), Ganassi (1535), Cardano (c.1546), Jambe de Fer (1556), and Praetorius (1619). Nonetheless, understanding of the instrument and its practice in this period is still developing.

==== Structure ====
In the sixteenth century, the recorder saw important developments in its structure. As in the recorders of the Middle Ages, the etiology of these changes remains uncertain, development was regional and multiple types of recorder existed simultaneously. Our knowledge is based on documentary sources and surviving instruments.

===== Surviving instruments =====
Far more recorders survive from the Renaissance than from the Middle Ages. Most of the surviving instruments from the period have a wide, cylindrical bore from the blockline to the uppermost fingerhole, an inverted conical portion down to around the lowest finger hole (the "choke"), then a slight flare to the bell. Externally, they have a curved shape similar to the bore, with a profile like a stretched hourglass. Their sound is warm, rich in harmonics, and somewhat introverted. Surviving consorts of this type, identified by their makers marks, include those marked "HIER S•" or "HIE•S" found in Vienna, Sibiu and Verona; and those marked with variations on a rabbit's footprint, designated "!!" by Adrian Brown, which are dispersed among various museums. The pitch of these recorders is often generally grouped around A = 466 Hz, however little pitch standardisation existed in the period. This type of recorder is described by Praetorius in De Organographia (1619). A surviving consort by "!!" follows the exact size configuration suggested by Praetorius: stacked fifths up from the basset in F_{3}, and down a fifth then a fourth to bass in B♭_{2} and great bass in F_{2}. Instruments marked "HIER S•" or "HIE•S" are in stacked fifths from great bass in F_{2} to soprano in E_{5}. Many of these instruments are pitched around A = 440 Hz or A = 466 Hz, although pitch varied regionally and between consorts.

The range of this type is normally an octave plus a minor 7th, but as remarked by Praetorius (1619) and demonstrated in the fingering tables of Ganassi's Fontegara (1535), experienced players on particular instruments were capable of playing up to a fourth or even a seventh higher (see #Documentary evidence: treatises). Their range is more suitable for the performance of vocal music, rather than purely instrumental music. This type is the recorder typically referred to as the "normal" Renaissance recorder, however this modern appellation does not fully capture the heterogeneity of instruments of the sixteenth century.

Another surviving Renaissance type has a narrow cylindrical bore and cylindrical profile like the medieval exemplars but a choke at the last hole. The earliest surviving recorders of this type were made by the Rafi family, instrument makers active in Lyons in Southern France in the early sixteenth century. Two recorders marked "C.RAFI" were acquired by the Accademia Filarmonica, Bologna in 1546, where they remain today. A consort of recorders of similar make, marked "P.GRE/C/E", was donated to the Accademia in 1675, expanding the pair marked "C.RAFI". Other recorders by the Rafi family survive in Northern Europe, notably a pair in Brussels. It is possible that Grece worked in the Rafi workshop, or was a member of the Rafi family. The pitch of the Rafi/Grece instruments is around A = 440 Hz. They have a relatively quiet sound with good pitch stability favouring dynamic expression.

In 1556, French author Philibert Jambe de Fer gave a set of fingerings for hybrid instruments such as the Rafi and Grece instruments that give a range of two octaves. Here, the 15th was now produced, as on most later recorders, as a variant of the 14th instead of as the fourth harmonic of the tonic, as in Ganassi's tables.

===== Documentary evidence: treatises =====
The first two treatises of the sixteenth century show recorders that differ from the surviving instruments dating to the century: these are Sebastian Virdung's (b. 1465?) Musica getutscht (1511), and Martin Agricola's (1486–1556) similar Musica instrumentalis deudsch (1529), published in Basel and Saxony respectively.

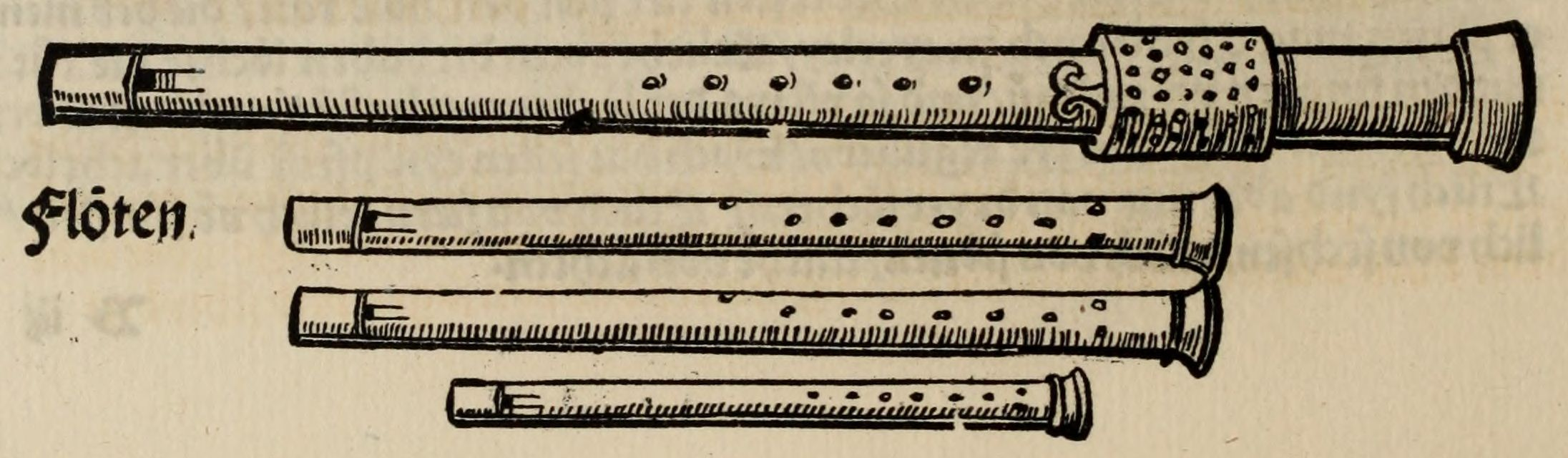
Recorders in Sebastian Virdung's Musica getutscht (1511). From top to bottom: a bass, two tenors, and an alto.

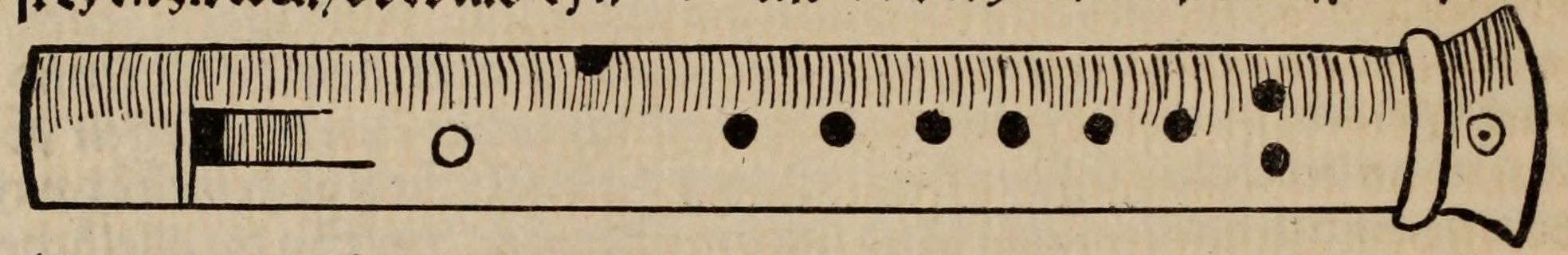
Another recorder in Virdung's Musica getutscht (1511).

Musica Getutscht, the earliest printed treatise on western musical instruments, is an extract of an earlier, now lost, manuscript treatise by Virdung, a chaplain, singer, and itinerant musician. The printed version was written in a vernacular form of Early New High German, and was aimed at wealthy urban amateur musicians: the title translates, briefly, as "Music, translated into German ... Everything there is to know about [music] – made simple." When a topic become too complex for Virdung to discuss briefly, he refers the reader to his lost larger work, an unhelpful practice for modern readers. While the illustrations have been called "maddeningly inaccurate" and his perspectives quirky, Virdung's treatise gives us an important source on the structure and performing practice of the recorder in northern Europe in the late fifteenth and early sixteenth centuries.

The recorders described by Virdung have cylindrical profiles with flat heads, narrow windows and long ramps, ring-like turnings on the feet, and a slight external flare at the bell (see illustrations to right). Virdung depicts four recorders together: a baßcontra or bassus (basset) in F_{3} with an anchor shaped key and a perforated fontanelle, two tenors in C_{4} and a discantus (alto) in G_{4}. According to Virdung, the configurations F–C–C–G or F–C–G–G should be used for four-part music, depending on the range of the bass part. As previously mentioned, the accuracy of these woodcuts cannot be verified as no recorders fitting this description survive. Virdung also provides the first ever fingering chart for a recorder with a range of an octave and a seventh, though he says that the bass had a range of only an octave and sixth. In his fingering chart, he numbers which fingers to lift rather than those to put down and, unlike in later charts, numbers them from bottom (1) to top (8). His only other technical instruction is that the player must blow into the instrument and "learn how to coordinate the articulations ... with the fingers".

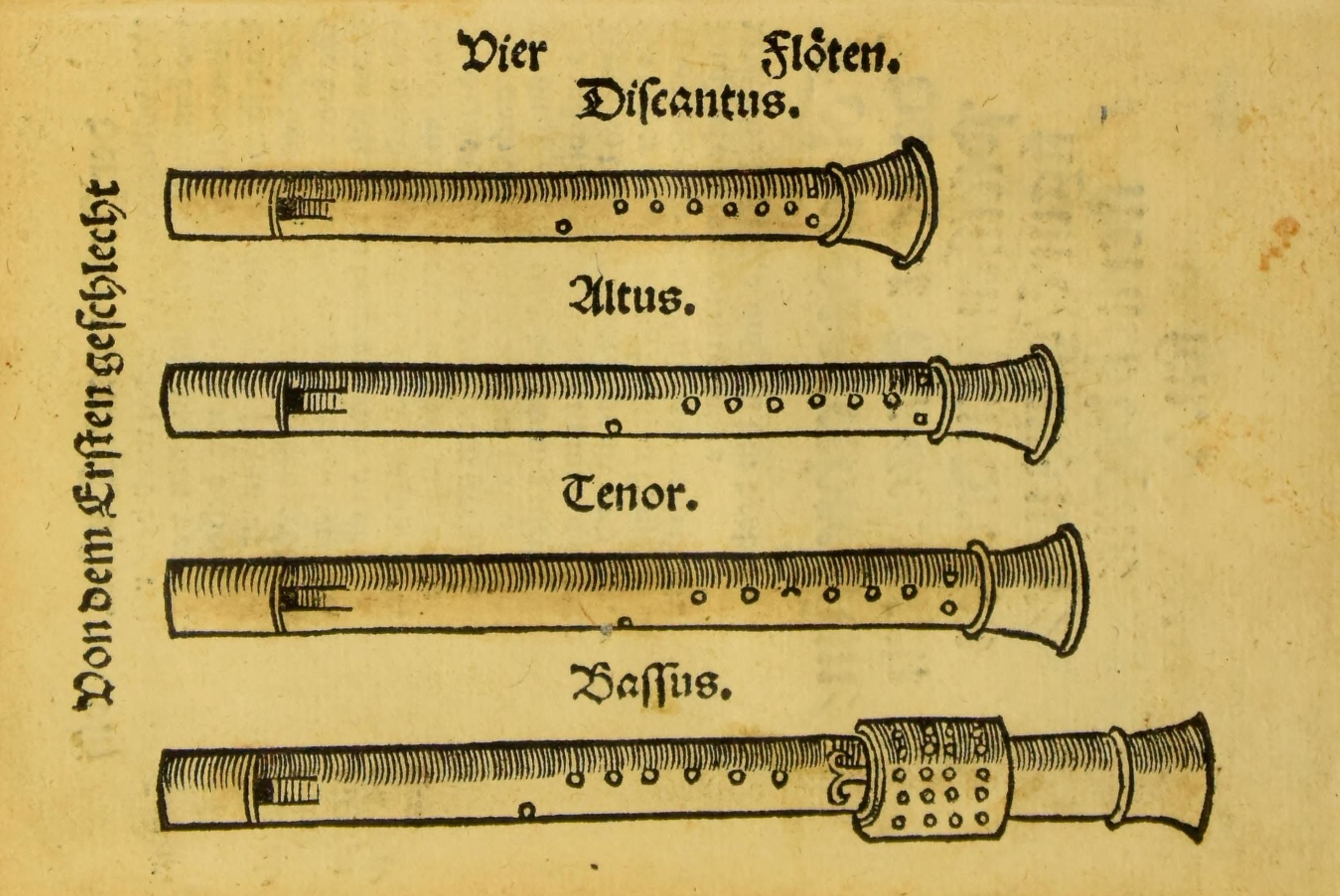
Recorders shown in Martin Agricola's Musica instrumentalis deudsch (1529). From top to bottom: a Discantus (soprano/descant), an Altus (alto), a tenor, and a Bassus (bass).

Martin Agricola's Musica instrumentalis Deudsch ("A German instrumental music, in which is contained how to learn to play ... all kinds of ... instruments"), written in rhyming German verse (ostensibly to improve the understanding and retention of its contents), provides a similar account and copies most of its woodcuts directly from Getutscht. Agricola also calls the tenor "altus", mistakenly depicting it as a little smaller than the tenor in the woodcut (see illustration to right). Like Virdung, Agricola takes it for granted that recorders should be played in four-part consorts. Unlike Getutscht, which provides a single condensed fingering chart, Agricola provides separate, slightly differing, fingering charts for each instrument, leading some to suppose that Agricola experimented on three different instruments, rather than copying the fingerings from one size to the other two. Agricola adds that graces (Mordanten), which make the melody subtil, must be learned from a professional (Pfeiffer), and that the manner of ornamentation (Coloratur) of the organist is best of all. A substantial 1545 revision of Musica Instrumentalis approvingly mentions the use of vibrato (zitterndem Wind) for woodwind instruments, and includes an account of articulation, recommending the syllables de for semiminims and larger, di ri for semiminims and smaller, and the articulation tell ell ell ell el le, which he calls the "flutter-tongue" (flitter zunge) for the smallest of note values, found in passagi (Colorirn).

The next treatise comes from Venice: Silvestro Ganassi dal Fontego's (1492–mid-1500s) Opera Intitulata Fontegara (1535), which is the first work to focus specifically on the technique of playing the recorder, and perhaps the only historical treatise ever published that approaches a description of a professional or virtuoso playing technique. Ganassi was a musician employed by the Doge and at the Basilica di San Marco at the time of the work's publication, an indication of his high level of accomplishment, and later wrote two works on the playing the viol and the violone, although he does not mention being employed by the Doge after Fontegara.

Fontegara can be broadly divided into two parts: the first concerns the technique of playing the recorder, the second demonstrated divisions (regole, passagi, ornaments), some of great complexity, which the player may use to ornament a melody or, literally, "divide" it into smaller notes. In all aspects, Ganassi emphasises the importance of imitating the human voice, declaring that "the aim of the recorder player is to imitate as closely as possible all the capabilities of the human voice", maintaining that the recorder is indeed able to do this. For Ganassi, imitation of the voice has three aspects: "a certain artistic proficiency", which seems to be the ability to perceive the nature of the music, prontezza (dexterity or fluency), achieved "by varying the pressure of the breath and shading the tone by means of suitable fingering," and galanteria (elegance or grace), achieved by articulation, and by the use of ornaments, the "simplest ingredient" of them being the trill, which varies according to the expression.

Ganassi gives fingering tables for a range of an octave and a seventh, the standard range also remarked by Praetorius, then tells the reader that he has discovered, through long experimentation, more notes not known to other players due to their lack of perseverance, extending the range to two octaves and a sixth. Ganassi gives fingerings for three recorders with different makers' marks, and advises the reader to experiment with different fingerings, as recorders vary in their bore. The maker's mark of one of the recorders, in the form of a stylised letter "A", has been associated with the Schnitzer family of instrument makers in Germany, leading Hermann Moeck to suppose that Ganassi's recorder might have been Northern European in origin. (see also Note on "Ganassi" recorders)

Ganassi uses three basic kinds of syllables te che, te re, and le re and also varies the vowel used with the syllable, suggesting the effect of mouth shape on the sound of the recorder. He gives many combinations of these syllables and vowels, and suggests the choice of the syllables according to their smoothness, te che being least smooth and le re being most so. He does not, however, demonstrate how the syllables should be used to music.

Most of the treatise consists of tables of diminutions of intervals, small melodies and cadences, categorised by their meter. These several hundred divisions use quintuplets, septuplets, note values from whole notes to 32nd notes in modern notation, and demonstrate immense variety and complexity.

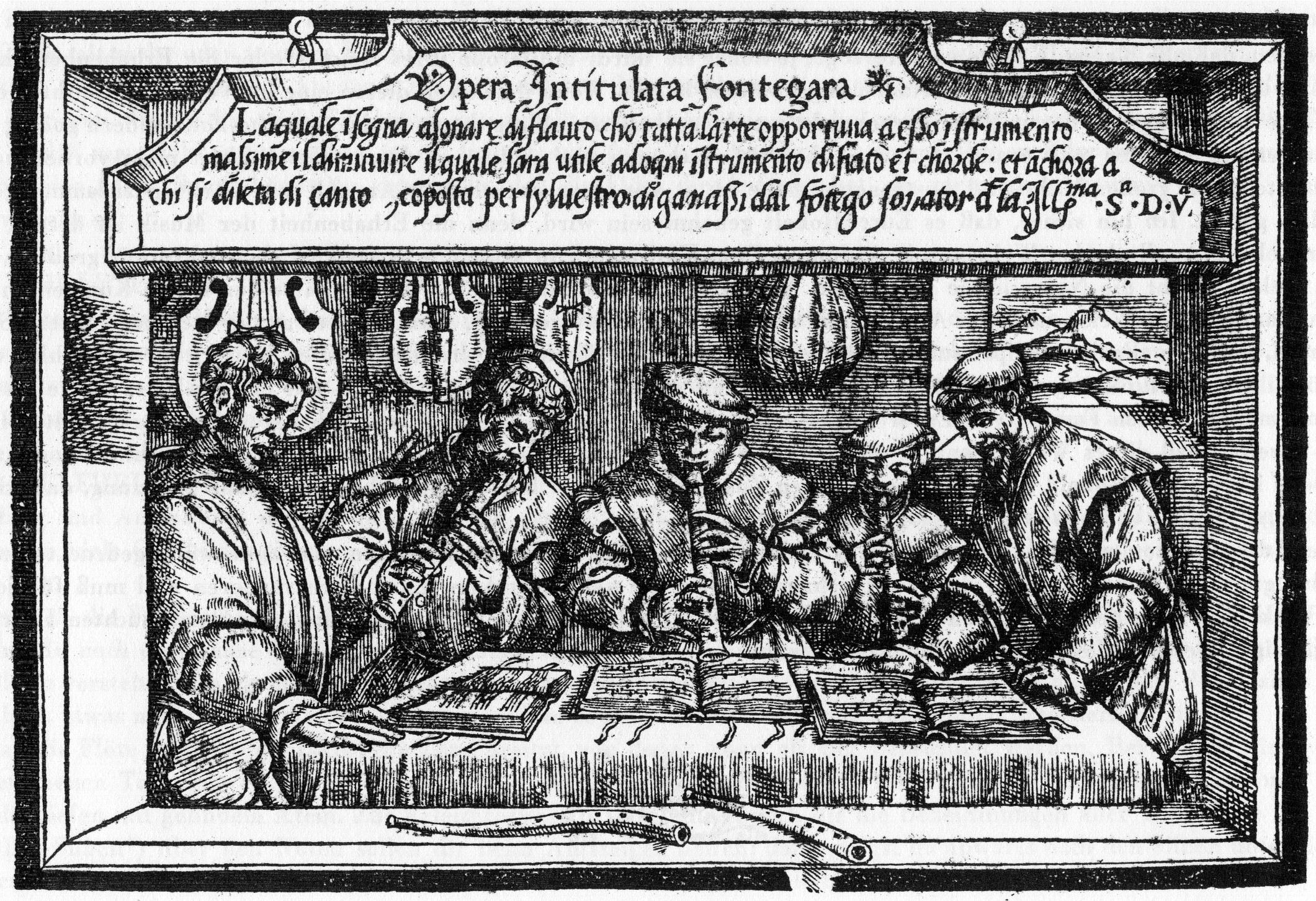
Frontispiece to Silvestro Ganassi dal Fontego's Opera Intitulata Fontegara (1535), showing an ensemble of three recorder players and two singers.

The frontispiece to Fontegara shows three recorder players play together with two singers. Like Agricola and Virdung, Ganassi takes for granted that recorders should be played in groups of four, and come in three sizes: F_{3}, C_{4} and G_{4}. He makes a distinction between solo playing and ensemble playing, noting that what he has said is for solo players, and that when playing with others, it is most important to match them. Unfortunately, Ganassi gives only a few ornamented examples with little context for their use. Nonetheless, Ganassi offers a tantalising glimpse at a highly developed professional culture and technique of woodwind playing that modern players can scarcely be said to have improved upon.

Gerolamo Cardano's De Musica was written around 1546, but not published until 1663 when it was published along with other works by Cardan, who was an eminent philosopher, mathematician and physician as well as a keen amateur recorder player who learned from a professional teacher, Leo Oglonus, as a child in Milan.

His account corroborates that of Ganassi, using the same three basic syllables and emphasising the importance of breath control and ornamentation in recorder playing, but also documents several aspects of recorder technique otherwise undocumented until the twentieth century. These include multiple techniques using the partial closing of the bell: to produce a tone or semitone below the tonic, and to change semitones into dieses (half semitones), which he says can also be produced by "repercussively bending back the tongue". He also adds that the position of the tongue, either extended or turned up towards the palate, can be used to improve, vary, and colour notes. He is the first to differentiate between the amount of the breath (full, shallow, or moderate) and the force (relaxed or slow, intense, and the median between them) as well as the different amount of air required for each instrument, and describes a trill or vibrato called a vox tremula in which "a tremulous quality in the breath" is combined with a trilling of the fingers to vary the interval from anything between a major third and a diesis. He is also the first writer to mention the recorder in D_{5} ("discantus"), which he leaves unnamed.

Composer and singer Philibert Jambe de Fer (c. 1515 – c. 1566) was the only French author of the sixteenth century to write about the recorder, in his Epitome musical. He complains of the French name for the instrument, fleutte à neuf trouz ('flute with nine holes') as, in practice, one of the lowermost holes must be plugged, leaving only eight open holes. He prefers fleute d'Italien or the Italian flauto. His fingering chart is notable for two reasons, first for describing fingerings with the 15th produced as a variant on the 14th, and for using the third finger of the lower hand as a buttress finger, although only for three notes in the lower octave. (See also Renaissance structure.)

Aurelio Virgiliano's "Il dolcimelo" (c. 1600) presents ricercars intended for or playable on the recorder, a description of other musical instruments, and a fingering chart for a recorder in G_{4} similar to Jambe de Fer's.

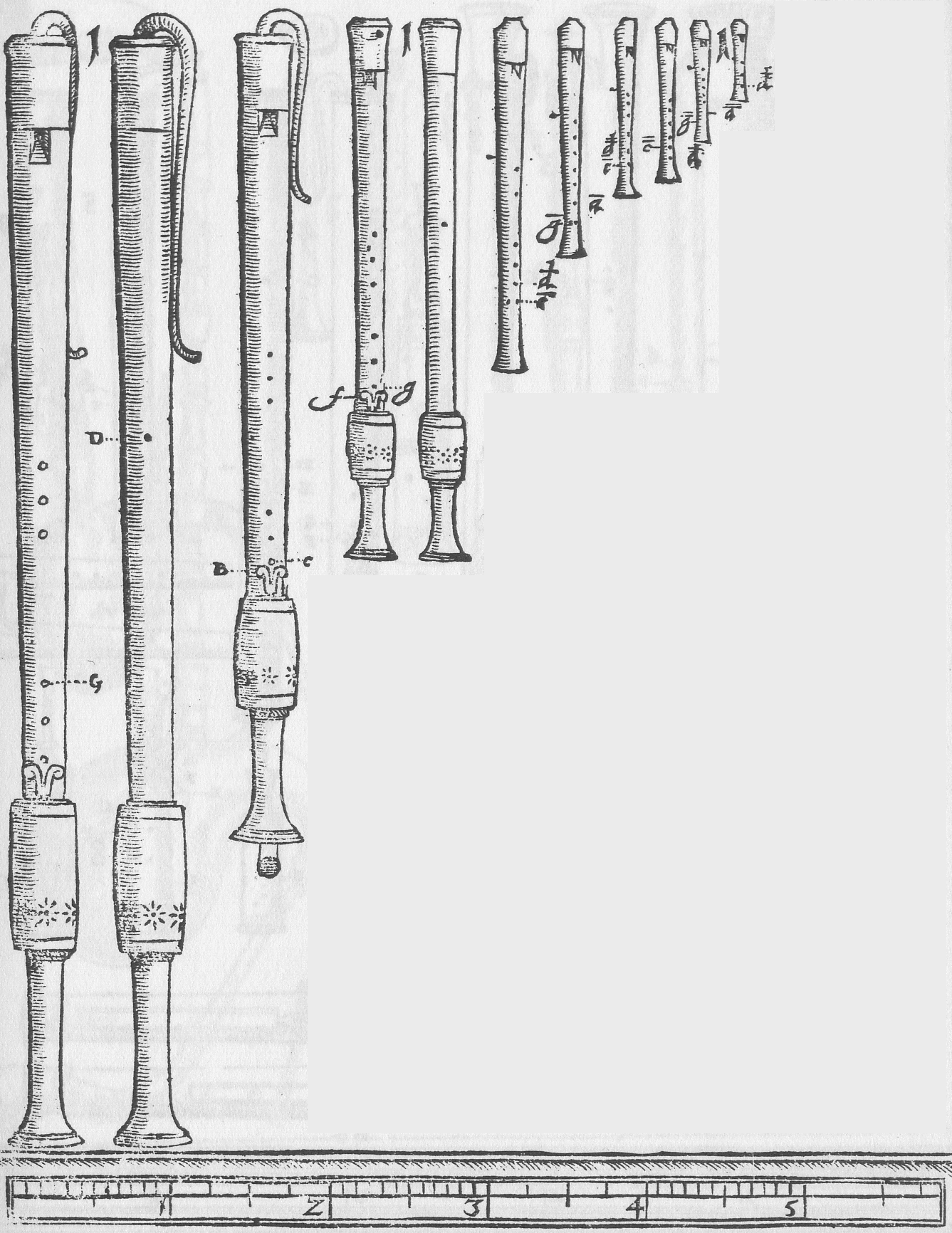
Recorders shown in Michael Praetorius's Syntagma Musicum (1629). From left to right: grossbass (2 views), bass, basset (2 views), tenor, alt, discant in C_{5} and D_{5}, klein Flötlein or exilent, and gar kleine Plockflötlein. At the bottom is a scale bar in feet and inches.

The Syntagma musicum (1614–20) of Michael Praetorius (1571–1621) in three volumes (a fourth was intended but never finished) is an encyclopaedic survey of music and musical instruments. Volume II, De Organographia (1619) is of particular interest for its description of no fewer than eight sizes of recorder (klein Flötlein or exilent in G_{5}, discant in C_{5} or D_{5}, alt in G_{4}, tenor in C_{4}, basset in F_{3}, bass in B♭_{2}, and grossbass in F_{2}) as well as the four-holed gar kleine Plockflötlein.

Praetorius was the first author to explain that recorders can confuse the ear into believing that they sound an octave lower than pitch, which phenomenon has more recently been explained in relation to the recorder's lack of high harmonics. He also shows the different "registers" of consort possible, 2′ (discant, alt, and tenor), 4′ (alt, tenor, and basset), and 8′ (tenor, basset, and bass) (see also Nomenclature). Additionally, he proposed cutting the recorder between the beak and the first finger hole to allow for a kind of tuning slide to raise or lower its pitch, similar to the Baroque practice of adjusting a recorder's pitch by "pulling out" the top joint of the recorder.

The recorders described in Praetorius are of the "stretched hourglass" profile (see illustration to right). He gives fingerings like those of Ganassi, and remarks that they normally have a range of an octave and a sixth, although exceptional players could extend that range by a fourth.

===== "Double recorder" =====
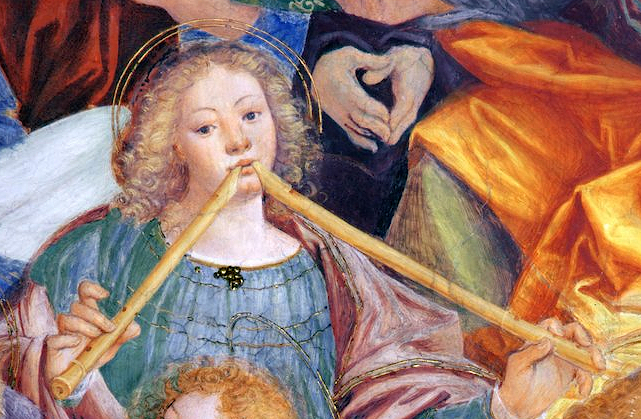
Circa 1534—1536, Italy. Double fipple flute played like aulos, detail from a painting The Concert of Angels by Gaudenzio Ferrari.

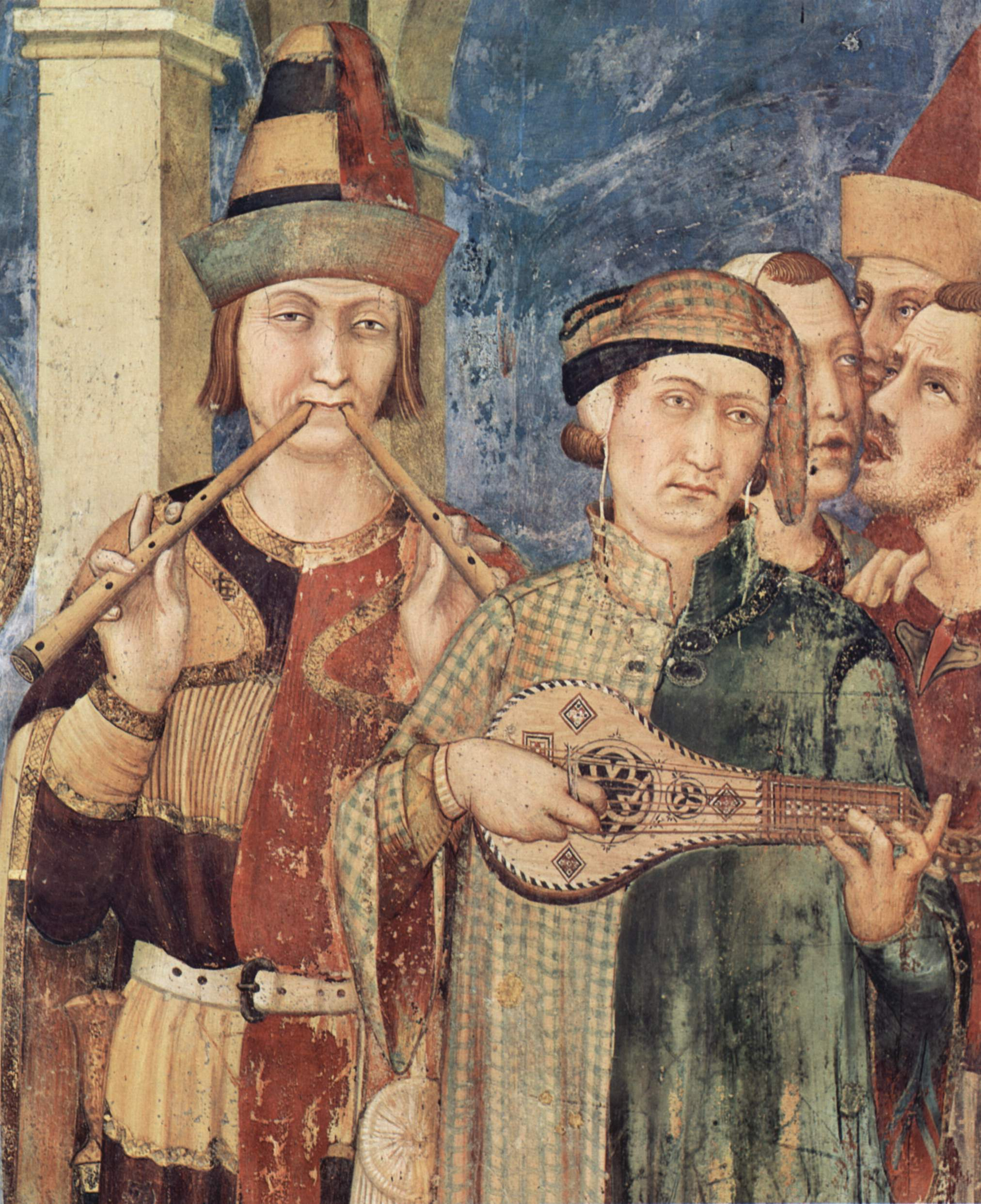
Circa 1312—1317, Italy. Flutes and gittern, from scenes from the life of St. Martin of Tours, by Simone Martini.

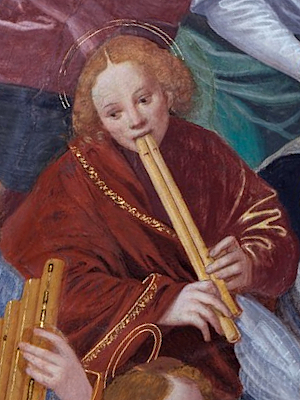
Circa 1534—1536, Italy. Double fipple flute played side-by-side, detail from a painting The Concert of Angels by Gaudenzio Ferrari.

Some paintings from the fourteenth and fifteenth centuries depict musicians playing what appear to be two end-blown flutes simultaneously. In some cases, the two flutes are evidently disjoint, separate flutes of similar make, played angled away from each other, one pipe in each hand. In others, flutes of the same length have differing hand positions. In a final case, the pipes are parallel, in contact with each other, and differ in length. While the iconographic criteria for a recorder are typically a clearly recognisable labium and a double handed vertical playing technique, such criteria are not prescriptive, and it is uncertain whether any of these depictions should be considered a single instrument, or constitute a kind of recorder. The identification of the instrument depicted is further complicated by the symbolism of the aulos, a double piped instrument associated with the satyr Marsyas of Greek mythology.

An instrument consisting of two attached, parallel, end-blown flutes of differing length, dating to the fifteenth or sixteenth century, was found in poor condition near All Souls College in Oxford. The instrument has four holes finger-holes and a thumb hole for each hand. The pipes have an inverted conical "choke" bore (see Renaissance structure). Bob Marvin has estimated that the pipes played a fifth apart, at approximately C_{5} and G_{5}. The instrument is sui generis. Although the instrument's pipes have thumb holes, the lack of organological precedent makes classification of the instrument difficult. Marvin has used the terms "double recorder" and the categorisation-agnostic flauto doppio (double flute) to describe the Oxford instrument.

Marvin has designed a flauto doppio based on the Oxford instrument, scaled to play at F_{4} and C_{5}. Italian recorder maker Francesco Livirghi has designed a double recorder or flauto doppio with connected, angled pipes of the same length but played with different hand positions, based on iconographic sources. Its pipes play at F_{4} and B♭_{4}. Both instruments use fingerings of the makers' design.

===== Note on "Ganassi" recorders =====
In the 1970s, when recorder makers began to make the first models of recorders from the sixteenth and seventeenth centuries, such models were not always representative of the playing characteristics of the original instruments. Especially notable is Fred Morgan's much copied "Ganassi" model, based loosely on an instrument in the Vienna Kunsthistorisches museum (inventory number SAM 135), which was designed to use the fingerings for the highest notes in Ganassi's tables in Fontegara. As Morgan knew, these notes were not in standard use; indeed Ganassi uses them in only a few of the hundreds of diminutions contained in Fontegara. Historically, such recorders did not exist as a distinct type, and the fingerings given by Ganassi were those of a skilled player particularly familiar with his instruments. When modern music is written for 'Ganassi recorders' it means this type of recorder.

==== Repertoire ====
Recorders were probably first used to play vocal music, later adding purely instrumental forms such as dance music to their repertoire. Much of the vocal music of the fifteenth, sixteenth and seventeenth centuries can be played on recorder consorts, and as illustrated in treatises from Virdung to Praetorius, the choice appropriate instruments and transpositions to play vocal music was common practice in the Renaissance. Additionally, some collections such as those of Pierre Attaingnant and Anthony Holborne, indicate that their instrumental music was suitable for recorder consorts. This section first discusses repertoire marked for the recorder, then briefly, other repertoire played on recorder.

In 1505 Giovanni Alvise, a Venetian wind player, offered Francesco Gonzaga of Mantua a motet for eight recorders, however the work has not survived.

Pierre Attaingnant's (fl. 1528–1549) Vingt & sept chansons musicales a quatre parties a la fleuste dallement...et a la fleuste a neuf trous (1533) collects 28 (not 27, as in the title) four-part instrumental motets, nine of which he says were suitable for performance on flutes (fleustes dallement, German flutes), two on recorders (fleuestes a neuf trous, nine-holed flutes, "recorders"), and twelve suitable for both. Of the twelve marked for both, seven use chiavi naturali, or low-clefs typically used for recorders, while the others use the chiavette clefs used in the motets marked for flutes. Hence, the seven notated in chiavi naturali could be considered more appropriate for recorders. Vingt et sept chansons is the first published music marked for a recorder consort. Earlier is a part for Jacobus Barbireau's song "Een vrolic wesen", apparently for recorder, accompanying the recorder fingering chart in Livre plaisant et tres utile... (Antwerp, 1529), a partial French translation of Virdung's Musica getutscht.

Jacques Moderne's S'ensuyvent plusieurs basses dances tant communes que incommunes published in the 1530s, depicts a four-part recorder consort such as those described in Virdung, Agricola, Ganassi and others, however the dances are not marked for recorders. His Musique de joye (1550) contains ricercares and dances for performance on "espinetes, violons & fleustes".

In 1539–40, Henry VIII of England, also a keen amateur player (see Cultural significance), imported five brothers of the Bassano family from Venice to form a consort, expanded to six members in 1550, forming a group that maintained an exceptional focus on the recorder until at least 1630 when the recorder consort was combined with the other wind groups. Most wind bands consisted of players playing sackbutts, shawms, and other loud instruments doubling on recorder. Some music probably intended for this group survives, including dance music by Augustine and Geronimo Bassano from the third quarter of the sixteenth century, and the more elaborate fantasias of Jeronimo Bassano (c. 1580), four in five parts and one in six parts. Additionally, the Fitzwilliam wind manuscript (GB-Cfm 734) contains wordless motets, madrigals and dance pieces, including some by the Bassano family, probably intended for a recorder consort in six parts.

The English members of the Bassano family, having originated in Venice, were also probably familiar with the vocal style, advanced technique, and complex improvised ornamentation described in Ganassi's Fontegara, and they were probably among the recorder players whom Ganassi reports having worked and studied with: when they were brought to England, they were regarded as some of the best wind players in Venice. While most of the music attributed to the consort uses only a range of a thirteenth, it is possible that the Bassano's were familiar with Ganassi's extended range.

Recorders were also played with other instruments, especially in England, where it was called a mixed consort or "broken consort".

Other sixteenth-century composers whose instrumental music can be played well on recorder consorts include:

- Anthony Holborne (c. 1545 – 1602)
- Tielman Susato (c. 1510 – c. 1570)

Other notable composers of the Renaissance whose music may be played on the recorder include:

- Guillaume Dufay (1397 – 1474)
- Johannes Ockeghem (1410/1425 – 1497)
- Josquin des Prez (1450/1455 – 1521)
- Heinrich Isaac (1450 – 1517)
- Ludwig Senfl (1486 – c. 1542)
- Orlando di Lasso (c. 1530 – 1594)
- William Byrd (c. 1539 – 1623)
- John Dowland (1563 – 1626)

==== Cultural significance ====
The recorder was widely used in the sixteenth century, and was one of the most common instruments of the Renaissance. From the fifteenth century onwards, paintings show upper-class men and women playing recorder, and Virdung's didactic treatise Musica getutscht (1511), the first of its kind, was aimed at the amateur (see also Documentary evidence). Henry VIII was a recorder player; at his death in 1547 an inventory of his possessions included 76 recorders in consorts of various sizes and materials. Some Italian paintings from the sixteenth century show aristocracy of both sexes playing the recorder, however many gentlemen found it unbecoming to play because it uses the mouth, preferring the lute and later the viol.

Shakespeare mentions the recorder in Hamlet, written at the turn of the seventeenth century, as does Milton in Paradise Lost published in 1667, in which fallen angels in Hell "move / in perfect phalanx to the Dorian mood / of flutes and soft recorders".

=== Baroque recorders ===
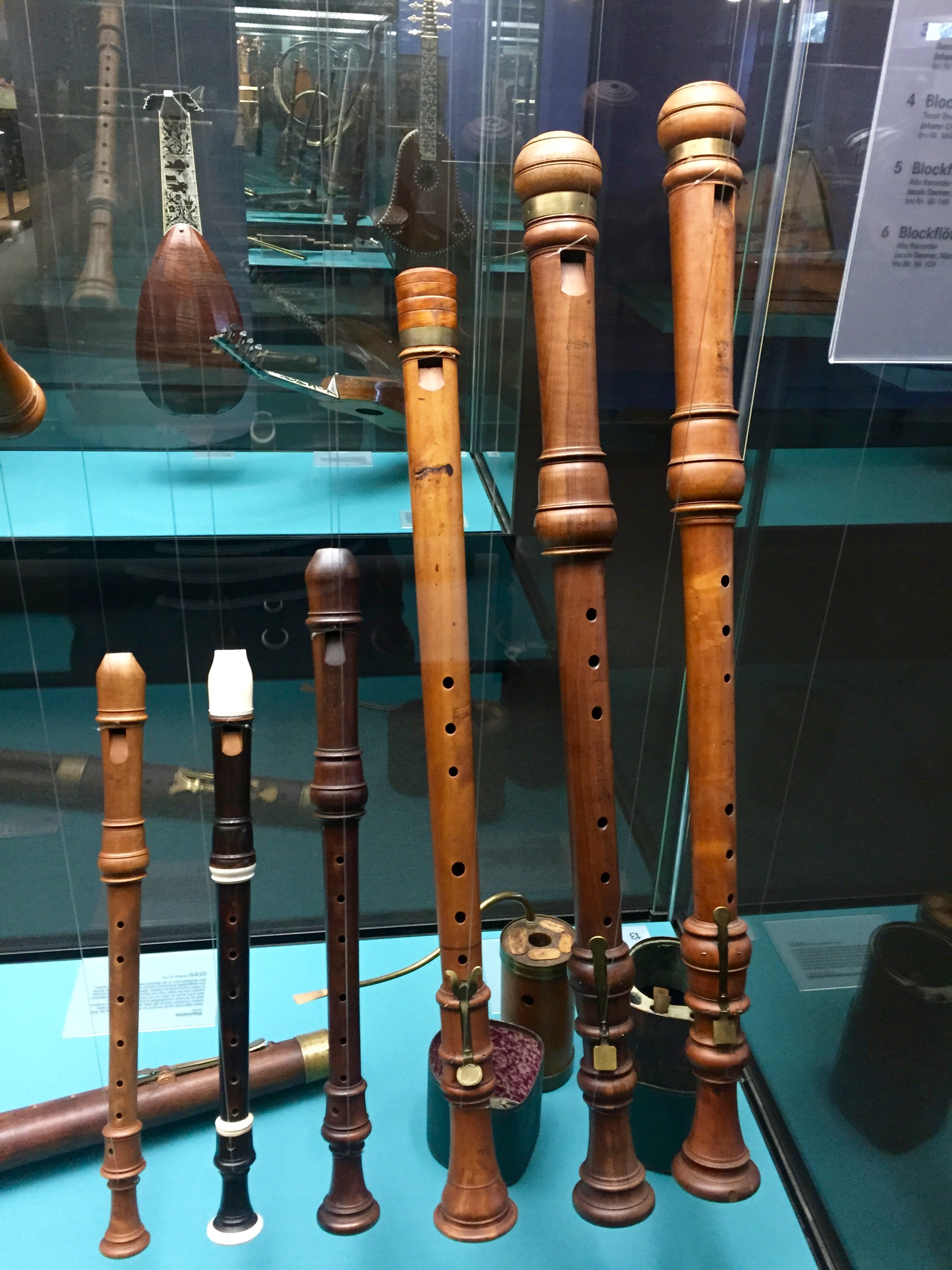
Early 18th century recorders made by Jacob and Johann Christoph Denner: (left to right) two altos in F, a "voice flute" (tenor in D), a bass in G, and two bass in F. Exhibit at the Germanisches Nationalmuseum, Nuremberg.

==== Structure ====
Several changes in the construction of recorders took place in the seventeenth century, resulting in the type of instrument generally referred to as Baroque recorders, as opposed to the earlier Renaissance recorders. These innovations allowed baroque recorders to possess a tone regarded as "sweeter" than that of the earlier instruments, at the expense of a reduction in volume, particularly in the lowest notes.

The evolution of the Renaissance recorder into the Baroque instrument is generally attributed to the Hotteterre family, in France. They developed the ideas of a more tapered bore, bringing the finger-holes of the lowermost hand closer together, allowing greater range, and enabling the construction of instruments in several jointed sections. The last innovation allowed more accurate shaping of each section and also offered the player minor tuning adjustments, by slightly pulling out one of the sections to lengthen the instrument.

The French innovations were taken to London by Pierre Bressan, a set of whose instruments survive in the Grosvenor Museum, Chester, as do other examples in various American, European and Japanese museums and private collections. Bressan's contemporary, Thomas Stanesby, was born in Derbyshire but became an instrument maker in London. He and his son (Thomas Stanesby junior) were the other important British-based recorder-makers of the early eighteenth century.

In continental Europe, the Denner family of Nuremberg, including Johann Christoph and his son Jacob, were the most celebrated makers of this period.

The baroque recorder produces a most brilliant and projecting sound in the second octave, which is more facile and extended than that of earlier recorders, while the lowest notes in its range are relatively weak. Composers such as Bach, Telemann and Vivaldi exploit this property in their concertos for the instrument.

Measured from its lowest to its highest playable note, the baroque alto recorder has a range of at most two octaves and a fifth with many instruments having a smaller range. Even the most developed instruments of the period, however, cannot produce the augmented tonic, third and fourth of the third octave. Notably, Georg Philipp Telemann's concerto TWV 51:F1 makes use some of these notes in the third octave, posing significant technical challenges to the player, perhaps requiring the covering of the bell or other unusual techniques.

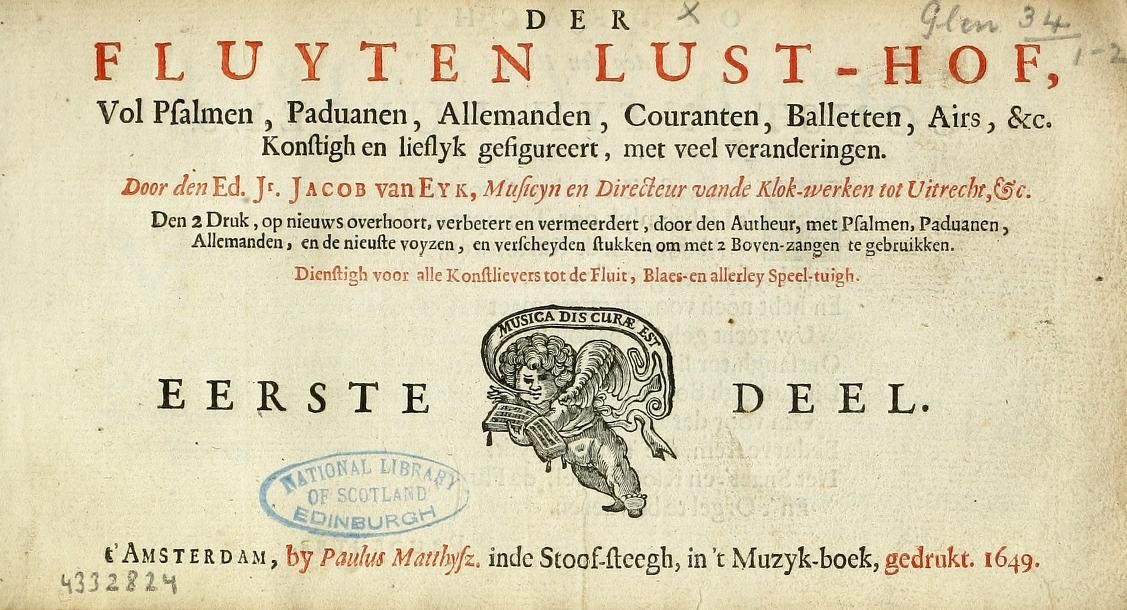
Title page of the first volume of Der Fluyten Lust-hof, 1649 edition.

==== Repertoire ====
Jacob van Eyck composed a collection of about 140 melodies, each with a number of diminutions or variations, for solo soprano recorder. This was published in two volumes as Der Fluyten Lust-hof.

During the baroque period, the recorder was traditionally associated with pastoral scenes, miraculous events, funerals, marriages, and amorous scenes. Images of recorders can be found in literature and artwork associated with all of these. Purcell, J. S. Bach, Telemann, and Vivaldi used the recorder to suggest shepherds and imitate birds in their music.

Although the recorder achieved a greater level of standardisation in the Baroque than in previous periods, indeed it is the first period in which there was a "standard" size of recorder, ambiguous nomenclature and uncertain organological evidence have led to controversy regarding which instruments should be used in some "flute" parts from the period.

===== Fourth Brandenburg Concerto BWV 1049 =====
The concertino group of Bach's fourth Brandenburg Concerto in G major, BWV 1049, consists of a violono principale, and due fiauti d'echo, with ripieno strings. His later harpsichord transcription of this concerto, BWV 1057, lowers the key by a tone, as in all of Bach's harpsichord transcriptions, and is scored for solo harpsichord, two fiauti à bec and ripieno strings. The desired instrument for the fiauti d'echo parts in BWV 1049 has been a matter of perennial musicological and organological debate for two primary reasons: first, the term fiauto d'echo is not mentioned in dictionaries or tutors of the period; and second, the first fiauto part uses F♯_{6}, a note which is difficult to produce on a Baroque alto recorder in F_{4}.

The instrumentation of BWV 1057 is uncontroversial: fiauti à bec unambiguously specifies recorders, and both parts have been modified to fit comfortably on altos in F_{4}, avoiding, for example, an unplayable E♭_{4} in the second fiauto that would have resulted from a simple transposition of a tone.

For the first and last movements of the concerto, two opinions predominate: first, that both recorder parts should be played on alto recorders in F_{4}; and second, that the first part should be played on an alto recorder in G and the second part on an alto in F. Tushaar Power has argued for the alto in G_{4} on the basis that Bach uses the high F♯_{6}, which can be easily played on an alto in G_{4}, but not the low F_{4}, a note not playable on the alto in G_{4}. He corroborates this with other alto recorder parts in Bach's cantatas. Michael Marissen reads the repertoire differently, demonstrating that in other recorder parts, Bach used both the low F_{4} and F♯_{6}, as well as higher notes. Marissen argues that Bach was not as consistent as Power asserts, and that Bach would have almost certainly had access to only altos in F. He corroborates this with examinations of pitch standards and notation in Bach's cantatas, in which the recorder parts are sometimes written as transposing instruments to play with organs that sounded as much as a minor third above written pitch. Marissen also reads Bach's revisions to the recorder parts in BWV 1057 as indicative of his avoidance of F♯_{6} in BWV 1049, a sign that he only used the difficult note when necessary in designing the part for an alto recorder in F_{4}. He posits that Bach avoided F♯_{6} in BWV 1049, at the cost of inferior counterpoint, reinstating them as E_{6} in BWV 1057.

In the second movement, breaking of beaming in the fiauto parts, markings of f and p, the fermata over the final double bar of the first movement, and the 21 bars of rest at the beginning of the third have led some musicologists to argue that Bach intended the use of "echo flutes" distinct from normal recorders in the second movement in particular. The breaking of beaming could be an indication of changes in register or tonal quality, the rests introduced to allow the players time to change instruments, and the markings of f and p further indicative of register or sound changes. Marissen has demonstrated that the f and p markings probably indicated tutti and solo sections rather than loud and soft ones.

A number of instruments other than normal recorders have been suggested for the fiauto d'echo. One of the earliest proposed alternatives, by Thurston Dart, was the use of double flageolets, a suggestion since revealed to be founded on unsteady musicological grounds. Dart did, however, bring to light numerous newspaper references to Paisible's performance on an "echo flute" between 1713 and 1718. Another contemporary reference to the "echo flute" is in Etienne Loulié's Elements ou principes de musique (Amsterdam, 1696): Les sons de deux flutes d'echo sont differents, parce que l'un est fort, & que l'autre est foible (The sounds of two echo flutes are different, because one is strong and the other is weak). Loulié is unclear on why one would need two echo flutes to play strongly and weakly, and on why it is that echo flutes differ. Perhaps the echo flute was composed in two halves: one which plays strongly, the other weakly? On this we can only speculate.

Surviving instruments which are candidates for echo flutes include an instrument in Leipzig which consists of two recorders of different tonal characteristics joined at the head and footjoints by brass flanges. But this particular instrument consists of two soprano recorders in d’. There is also evidence of double recorders tuned in thirds, but these are not candidates for the fiauto parts in BWV 1049.

===== "Concerti per flautino" RV 443, 444, 445 =====
Vivaldi wrote three concertos for the flautino, possibly for performance by students at the Ospedale della Pietà in Venice, where he taught and composed in the early eighteenth century. They feature virtuosic solo writing, and along with his concerto RV 441 and trio sonata RV 86 are his most virtuosic recorder works. They each survive a single hastily written manuscript copy, each titled Con.to per Flautino (Concerto for little flute) with the additional note Gl'istrom.ti trasportati alla 4a (The instruments transpose by a fourth) in RV 443 and Gl'istrom.ti alla 4ta Bassa (The instruments lower by a fourth) in RV 445. The three concertos RV 443, 444, and 445 are notated in C major, C major and A minor respectively. Also of note is the occasional use of notes outside the normal two octave compass of the recorder: the range of the solo sections is two octaves from notated F_{4} to notated F_{6}, however there is a single notated C_{4} in the first movement of RV 444, a notated E_{4} in a tutti section in the first movement of RV 443 and low E_{4} in multiple tutti sections of RV 445.

A number of possible flautini have been proposed as the instrument intended for the performance of these concertos. The first suggestion was the use of the one keyed piccolo, or another small transverse flute, however such instruments had fallen out of use in Venice by the generally accepted time of composition of these concertos in the 1720s, and this opinion is no longer considered well supported. Another suggestion, first proposed by Peter Thalheimer, is the "French" flageolet (see Flageolets below) in G_{5}, which was notated in D_{4}, appearing a fourth lower, possibly explaining the note in the margins of RV 443 and RV 445 (Gl'istromti transportati alla 4a) and supported by Bismantova (1677 rev. 1694) and Bonanni (1722) which equate flautino to the flageolet. However this suggestion has been opposed by the presence of notated F_{4} and F♯_{4} which are not within the typical compass of the flageolet, although they may be produced through the covering of the bell, sometimes combined with underblowing, as attested by theorists as early as Cardano (c. 1546) and as late as Bellay (c. 1800).

Two instruments are conventionally accepted today for the performance of these concertos, the sopranino recorder, notated like an alto but sounding an octave higher, and the soprano recorder, following the instruction to transpose the parts down by a fourth. Winfried Michel was first to argue in favour of the soprano recorder in 1983, when he proposed to take Vivaldi at his word and transpose the string parts down a fourth and play the flautino part on a soprano recorder in C_{5} (also "fifth-flute") using the English practice of notating such flutes as transposing instruments using the fingerings of an alto recorder. Michel notes that this transposition allows for the use of the violins' and viola's lowest strings (in sections where they provide the accompaniment without bass) and the lowest two notes of the 'cello. He attributes the presence of notes not in the recorder's normal compass to Vivaldi's haste, noting that these notes do not appear in the solo sections. He has edited editions of RV 443 and RV 445 for soprano recorder in G major and E minor respectively. Federico Maria Sardelli concurs with Michel in supposing that the margin note was intended to allow the performance of the concertos on the soprano recorder on a specific occasion, however concludes that they were probably written for the sopranino recorder in F_{5}, noting that small transverse flutes had fallen out of use in Italy by Vivaldi's time, the paucity of flageolets in Italy, the range of the parts, and uses of the flautino in vocal arias.

=== Classical and Romantic ===
The recorder was little used in art music of the Classical and Romantic periods. Researchers have long debated why this change occurred, and to what extent the recorder remained use in the late eighteenth century, and later the nineteenth century. A significant question in this debate is which, if any, duct flutes of this period are recorders or successors to recorders.

==== Repertoire ====
The recorder work of the latter half of the eighteenth century most known today is probably a trio sonata by C. P. E. Bach, Wq.163, composed in 1755 – an arrangement of a trio sonata for two violins and continuo, scored for the unusual ensemble of viola, bass recorder and continuo. This work is also notable for being perhaps the only significant surviving historical solo work for bass recorder. Also of note are the works of Johann Christoph Schultze (c. 1733–1813), who wrote two concertos for the instrument, one in G major and another in B♭ major, written around 1740. The last occurrences of the recorder in art music are apparently by Carl Maria von Weber in Peter Schmoll und seine Nachbarn (1801) and Kleiner Tusch (1806). Hector Berlioz may have intended "La fuite en Egypte" from L'enfance du Christ (1853) for the instrument. Donizetti owned three recorders. Rossini owned two.

==== Decline ====
Many reasons supporting the conventional view that the recorder declined have been proposed. The first significant explanation for the recorder's decline was proposed by Waitzman (1967), who proposed six reasons:

1. The recorder lacked a significant class of professional players
2. The recorder's true nature was not appreciated
3. The high tessitura of the instrument discouraged composers from writing idiomatically for the instrument
4. The exploitation of the highest registers posed special problems for makers and players
5. Interest in clarino (4′ pitch) instruments was waning
6. As a result of the first five factors, the recorder had a bad reputation, which discouraged students from studying the instrument

In the Baroque, the majority of professional recorder players were primarily oboists or string players. For this reason, the number of professional exponents of the recorder was smaller than that of other woodwinds.

Others attribute the decline of the recorder in part to the flute innovators of the time, such as Grenser, and Tromlitz, who extended the transverse flute's range and evened out its tonal consistency through the addition of keys, or to the supposedly greater dynamic range and volume of the flute. Similar developments occurring in many other orchestral instruments to make them louder, increase their range, and increase their tonal consistency did not simultaneously occur in the case of the recorder.

A complementary view recently advanced by Nikolaj Tarasov is that the recorder, rather than totally disappearing, evolved in similar ways to other wind instruments through the addition of keys and other devices, and remained in use throughout the nineteenth century, with its direct descendant's popularity overlapping with the late nineteenth- and early twentieth-century recorder revival. Support for this view rests on the organological classification of some nineteenth century duct flutes as recorders. For more on this question, see "Other duct flutes".

==== Other duct flutes ====
Duct flutes remained popular even as the recorder waned in the eighteenth century. As in the instrument's earliest history, questions of the instrument's quiddity are at the forefront of modern debate. The modification and renaming of recorders in the eighteenth century in order to prolong their use, and the uncertainty of the extent of the recorder's use the late eighteenth and early nineteenth centuries have fuelled these debates. Some recent researchers contend that some nineteenth-century duct flutes are actually recorders. This article briefly discusses the duct flutes presented as successors to the recorder: the English flageolet and the csakan, which were popular among amateurs in the second half of the eighteenth century, and the whole of the nineteenth.

===== Flageolets =====
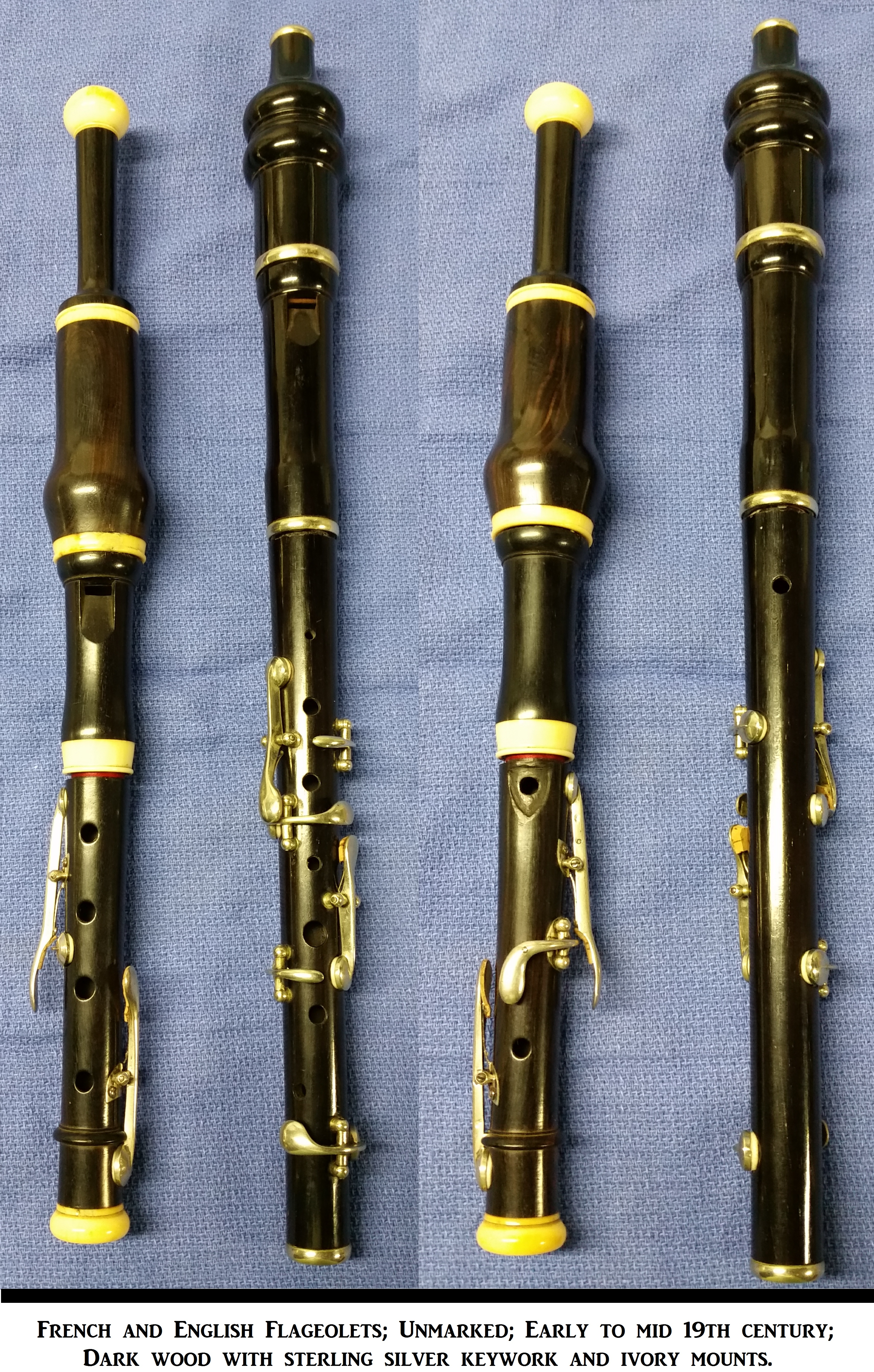
French flageolet, left; English flageolet, right. Mid-nineteenth c. Note the seven finger holes and single thumb hole of the English flageolet

The word flageolet has been used since the sixteenth century to refer to small duct flutes, and the instrument is sometimes designated using general terms such as flautino and flauto piccolo, complicating identification of its earliest form. It was first described by Mersenne in Harmonie universelle (1636) as having four fingers holes on the front and two thumb holes on the back, with a lowest note C6 and a compass of two octaves. Like the recorder, the upper thumb hole is used as an octaving vent. Flageolets were generally small flutes; however, their lowest note varies. They were initially popular in France, and it is from there that the flageolet first arrived in England in the seventeenth century, becoming a popular amateur instrument, as the recorder later did. Indeed, when the recorder was introduced to England, it was presented as an easy instrument for those who already played the flageolet, and the earliest English recorder tutors are notated in the flageolet tablature of the time, called "dot-way". Notably, the diarist and naval administrator Samuel Pepys (1633–1703) and his wife were both amateur players of the flageolet, and Pepys was later an amateur recorder player.

Starting in the early 1800s, a number of innovations were introduced to the flageolet, including the addition of keys to extend its range and allow it to more easily play accidentals. They also included solutions to the problem of condensation: most commonly, a sea sponge was placed inside the wind chamber (the conical chamber above the windway) to soak up moisture. More novel solutions such as the insertion of a thin wooden wedge into the windway, the drilling of little holes in the side of the block to drain condensation, and a complex system for draining condensation through a hollowed-out block were also developed. Around 1800 in England, the recorder ("English flute", see Name) came to be called an "English flageolet", appropriating the name of the more fashionable instrument. From at least this time to the present, the flageolet in its first form has been called the French flageolet to differentiate it from the so-called English flageolet.

From around 1803, when the London instrument maker William Bainbridge obtained a number of patents for improvements to the English flageolet, instruments were often referred as "improved" or "patent" flageolets with little reference to how they actually differed from their predecessors. In this period, the instrument had six finger holes and single thumb hole, and had as many as six keys. Tarasov reports that the English flageolets of the late eighteenth century had six finger holes and no thumb hole, and later regained the thumb hole and seventh finger hole (see above, right). The English flageolet never reached the level of popularity that the "French" flageolet enjoyed in the nineteenth century, possibly because the latter instrument was louder. Both remained popular until the beginning of the twentieth century.

A significant amount of music was written for the flageolet in the nineteenth century, such as the etudes of Narcisse Bousquet, although much of it was directed at amateurs.

English flageolets that may qualify as recorders are of two types: those early instruments, called "English flageolets", which were actually recorders, and nineteenth-century instruments with seven finger holes and a thumb hole. These instruments are not typically regarded as recorders; however, Tarasov has argued for their inclusion in the family.

===== Csakan =====
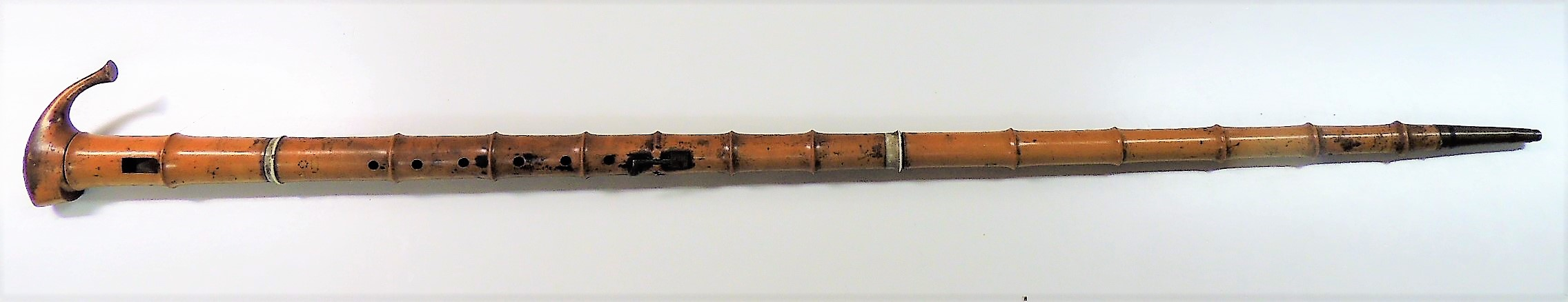
A csakan in the Österreichisches Blasmusikmuseum in Oberwölz, Styria, Austria.

The csakan (from Hung. csákány 'pickaxe'), also known by the recorder's old French name flute douce, was a duct flute in the shape of a walking stick or oboe popular in Vienna from about 1800 to the 1840s. The csakan was played using the fingerings of a recorder in C, and was typically pitched in A♭ or G and played as a transposing instrument. The first documented appearance of the csakan was at a concert in Budapest on 18 February 1807 in a performance by its billed inventor, Anton Heberle (fl. 1806–16). Tarasov has contested Heberle's status as the inventor of the instrument, and has argued that the csakan grew out of a Hungarian war hammer of the same name, which was converted into a recorder, perhaps for playing military music. Around 1800, it was highly fashionable for make walking sticks with additional functions (e.g., umbrellas, swords, flutes, oboes, clarinets, horns) although the csakan was the most popular of these, and the only one that became a musical instrument in its own right.

The earliest instruments were shaped like a walking stick with a mouthpiece in the handle and had no keys, although they could eventually have up to thirteen keys, along with a tuning slide and a device for narrowing the thumb hole. In the 1820s a csakan "in the pleasing shape of an oboe" was introduced in a "simple" form with a single key and a "complex" form with up to twelve keys like those found on contemporaneous flutes. Well-known makers of the csakan included Johann Ziegler and Stephan Koch in Vienna, and Franz Schöllnast in Pressburg. According to accounts left by Schöllnast, the csakan was primarily an amateur instrument, purchased by those who wanted something simple and inexpensive, however there were also accomplished professionals, such as Viennese court oboist Ernst Krähmer (1795–1837) who toured as far afield as Russia, playing the csakan with acclaimed virtuosity.

Around 400 works for the csakan were published in the first half of the nineteenth century, mainly for csakan solo, csakan duet or csakan with guitar or piano. The csakan's repertoire has not yet been fully explored. Notable composers for the instrument include Heberle and Krähmer, and Tarasov notes that piano works by Beethoven were arranged for csakan and guitar (Beethoven is reported to have owned a walking-stick csakan). Modern recorder makers such as Bernhard Mollenhauer and Martin Wenner have made csakan copies.

Similarities in fingering and design make the csakan at least a close relative of the recorder. Accounts of Krähmer's playing, which report his "diminishing and swelling the notes, up to an almost unbelievable loudness" imply a developed technique using shading and alternate fingerings, far beyond a purely amateur culture of house music. Additionally, Tarasov reports that some recorders by Baroque makers were modified, around 1800, through the addition of keys, including a J. C. Denner (1655–1707) basset recorder in Budapest and an alto by Nikolaus Staub (1664–1734) with added G♯ keys, like the D♯ key on a baroque two-key flute. Another modification is the narrowing of the thumb hole, by way of an ivory plug on the J. C. Denner basset and an alto by Benedikt Gahn (1674–1711), to allow it to serve purely as an octaving vent, as found on many flageolets and csakans. These changes may be archetypal to those found on csakans and flageolets, and constitute an inchoate justification for the continuous development of the Baroque recorder into its nineteenth-century relatives.

=== Modern revival ===
==== The "revival" ====
The concept of a recorder "revival" must be considered in the context of the decline of the recorder in the eighteenth and nineteenth centuries. The craft of recorder making was continued in some form by a number of families, such as the Berchtesgaden Fleitl produced by the Oeggle family, which traces its lineage to the Walch family of recorder makers the careers of the Schlosser family of Zwota. Heinrich Oskar Schlosser (1875–1947) made instruments sold by the firm of Moeck in Celle and helped to design their Tuju series of recorders. The firm Mollenhauer, currently headed by Bernhard Mollenhauer, can trace its origins to historical instrument makers.

The recorder, if it did persist through the nineteenth century, did so in a manner quite unlike the success it enjoyed in previous centuries, or that it would enjoy in the century to come in. Among the earliest ensembles to begin use of recorders in the twentieth century was the Bogenhauser Künstlerkapelle (Bogenhausen Artists' Band) which from 1890 to 1939 used antique recorders and other instruments to play music of all ages, including arrangements of classical and romantic music. Nonetheless, the recorder was considered primarily an instrument of historical interest.

The eventual success of the recorder in the modern era is often attributed to Arnold Dolmetsch. While he was responsible for broadening interest in the United Kingdom beyond the small group of early music specialists, Dolmetsch was not solely responsible for the recorder's broader revival. On the continent his efforts were preceded by those of musicians at the Brussels Conservatoire (where Dolmetsch received his training), and by the German Bogenhauser Künstlerkapelle. Also in Germany, the work of Willibald Gurlitt, Werner Danckerts and Gustav Scheck proceeded quite independently of the Dolmetsches.

==== Players ====
Carl Dolmetsch, the son of Arnold Dolmetsch, became one of the first virtuoso recorder players in the 1920s; but more importantly he began to commission recorder works from leading composers of his day, especially for performance at the Haslemere festival which his father ran. Initially as a result of this, and later as a result of the development of a Dutch school of recorder playing led by Kees Otten, the recorder was introduced to serious musicians as a virtuoso solo instrument both in Britain and in northern Europe.

Among the influential virtuosos who figure in the revival of the recorder as a serious concert instrument in the latter part of the twentieth century are Ferdinand Conrad, Kees Otten, Frans Brüggen, Roger Cotte, Hans-Martin Linde, Bernard Krainis, and David Munrow. Brüggen recorded most of the landmarks of the historical repertoire and commissioned a substantial number of new works for the recorder. Munrow's 1975 double album The Art of the Recorder remains as an important anthology of recorder music through the ages.

Among late twentieth-century and early 21st-century recorder ensembles, the trio Sour Cream (led by Frans Brüggen), Flautando Köln, the Flanders Recorder Quartet, Amsterdam Loeki Stardust Quartet and Quartet New Generation have programmed mixtures of historical and contemporary repertoire. Soloists such as Piers Adams, Dan Laurin and Dorothee Oberlinger, Michala Petri, Maurice Steger.

In the 2012 Charlotte Barbour-Condini became the first recorder player to reach the final of the biennial BBC Young Musician of the Year competition. Recorder player Sophie Westbrooke was a finalist in the 2014 competition.

==== Structure ====
The first recorders to be played in the modern period were antique instruments from previous periods. Anecdotally, Arnold Dolmetsch was motivated to make his own recorders after losing a bag containing his antique instruments. Recorders made in the early twentieth century were imitative of baroque models in their exterior form, but differed significantly in their structure. Dolmetsch introduced English fingering, the now standard fingering for "baroque" model instruments, and standardised the doubled 6th and 7th holes found on a handful of antique instruments by the English makers Stanesby and Bressan. Dolmetsch instruments generally had a large rectangular windway, unlike the curved windways of all historical instruments, and played at modern pitch.

==== Repertoire ====
Nearly twice as many pieces have been written for the recorder since its modern revival as were written in all previous epochs. Many of these were composed by avant-garde composers of the latter half of the twentieth century who used the recorder for the variety of extended techniques which are possible using its open holes and its sensitivity to articulation.

Etherea (Colin Ross, 1995)
New-age music performed on the recorder. 03:08 minutes

Modern composers of great stature have written for the recorder, including Paul Hindemith, Luciano Berio, Jürg Baur, Markus Zahnhausen, Josef Tal, John Tavener, Michael Tippett, Benjamin Britten, Leonard Bernstein, Gordon Jacob, Malcolm Arnold, Steven Stucky, Sean Hickey, and Edmund Rubbra.

Owing to its ubiquity as a teaching instrument and the relative ease of sound production, the recorder has occasionally been used in popular music by groups such as The Beatles; the Rolling Stones (see, for example, "Ruby Tuesday"); Yes, for example, in the song "I've Seen All Good People"; Jefferson Airplane with Grace Slick on Surrealistic Pillow; Led Zeppelin ("Stairway to Heaven"); Jimi Hendrix; Siouxsie and the Banshees; Judy Dyble of Fairport Convention; Dido (e.g. "Grafton Street" on Safe Trip Home).

== Manufacture ==
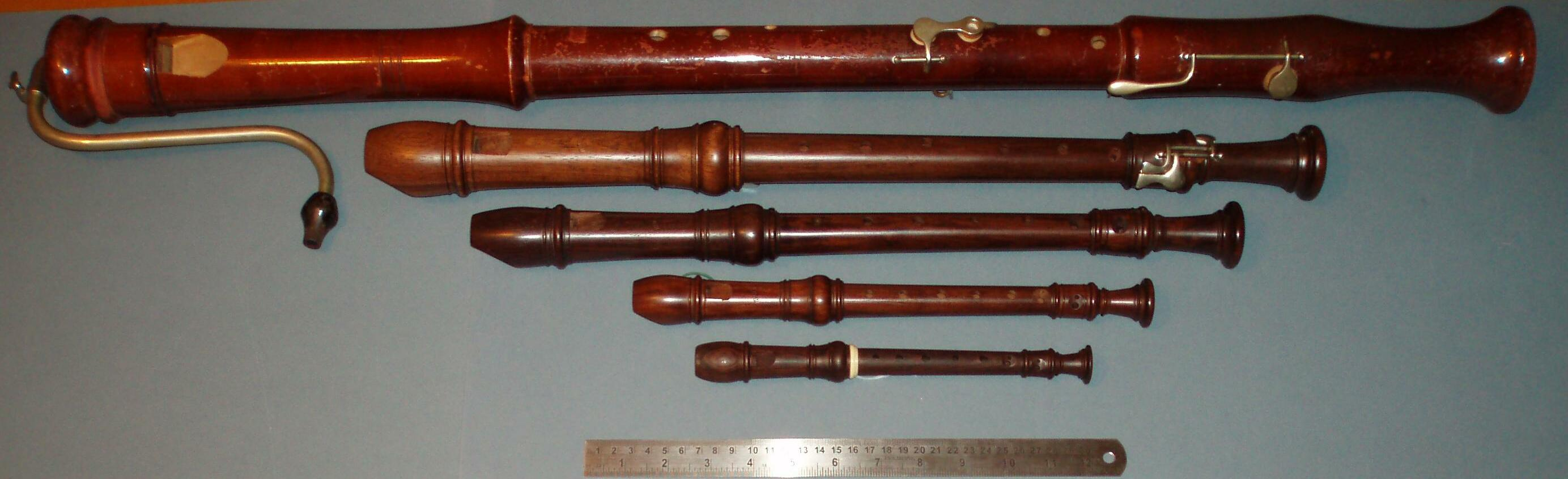
From top to bottom: bass, tenor, alto/treble, soprano/descant and sopranino recorders

The trade of recorder making was traditionally transmitted via apprenticeship. Notable historical makers include the Rafi, Schnitzer and Bassano families in the renaissance; Stanesby (Jr. and Sr.), J.C. and J. Denner, Hotteterre, Bressan, Haka, Heitz, Rippert, Rottenburgh, Steenbergen and Terton. Most of these makers also built other wind instruments such as oboes and transverse flutes. Notably, Jacob Denner is credited with the development of the clarinet from the chalumeau.

Recorder making declined with the instrument's wane in the late eighteenth century, essentially severing the craft's transmission to the modern age. With few exceptions, the duct flutes manufactured in the nineteenth and late eighteenth centuries were intended for amateur or educational use, and were not constructed to the high standard of earlier epochs.

Arnold Dolmetsch, the first to achieve commercial production in the twentieth century, began to build recorders in 1919. While these early recorders played at a low pitch like that of the available originals, he did not strive for exactitude in reproduction, and by the 1930s the Dolmetsch family firm, then under the direction of Arnold's son Carl Dolmetsch, was mass-producing recorders at modern pitch with wide, straight windways, and began to produce bakelite recorders shortly after the Second World War. Nonetheless, the Dolmetsch models were innovative for their time and proved influential, particularly in standardising the English fingering system now standard for modern baroque-style instruments and doubled 6th and 7th holes, which are rare on antique instruments.

In Germany, Peter Harlan began to market recorders provided by various makers in the 1920s, primarily for educational use in the youth movement. Contrary to popular belief, he never made recorders himself. Following Harlan's success, numerous makers such as Adler and Mollenhauer began commercial production of recorders, fuelling an explosion in the instrument's popularity in Germany. These recorders shared little in common with antiques, with large straight windways, anachronistically pitched consorts, modified fingering systems and other innovations.

In the latter half of the twentieth century, historically informed performance practice was on the rise and recorder makers increasingly sought to imitate the sound and character of antiques. The German-American maker Friedrich von Huene was among the first to research recorders held in European collections and produce instruments intended to reproduce the qualities of the antiques. Von Huene and his Australian colleague Frederick Morgan sought to connect the tradition of the historical wind-makers to the modern day with the understanding that doing so creates the best instruments, and those most suited to ancient music.

Today, makers maintaining individual workshops include Ammann, Blezinger, Bolton, Boudreau, Breukink (dead), Brown, Coomber (discontinued), Cranmore, de Paolis, Ehlert, Holmblat, Meyer (dead), Musch, Netsch, Prescott (discontinued), Rohmer, Takeyama, von Huene, Wenner and Willman. French maker Philippe Bolton created an electroacoustic recorder and is among the last to offer mounted bell-keys and double bell-keys for both tenor and alto recorders. Those bell-keys extend easily the range of the instrument to more than three octaves. A bell key as such was probably first made in 1953 by John W.F. Juritz, a physics lecturer and bassoonist in Cape Town, whose invention was not patented. It was reinvented by Carl Dolmetsch in 1957 who first used the bell-key system publicly in 1958.

== Use in schools ==
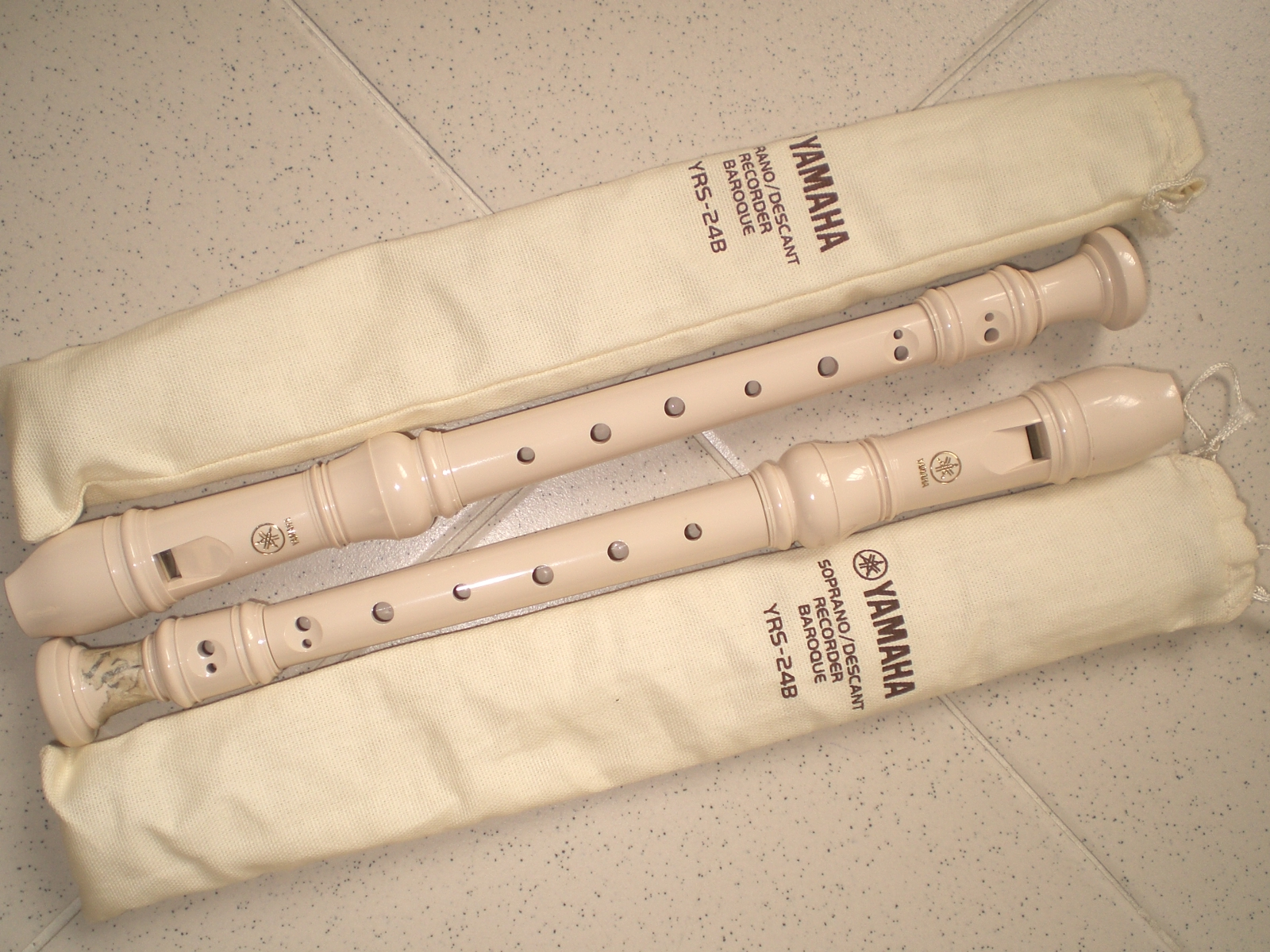
Plastic recorder (Yamaha).

In the 20th century, Carl Orff used the recorder as part of his Orff-Schulwerk didactic approach. His five-volume Musik für Kinder, published between 1950 and 1954, contains pieces for recorders, often in combination with other instruments.

Manufacturers have made recorders out of bakelite and other more modern plastics; they are thus easy to produce, hence inexpensive. Because of this, recorders are popular in schools, as they are one of the cheapest instruments to buy in bulk.

In the 1940s and 1950s, the mid-20th century recorder revival was driven in part by manufacturers utilizing plastic injection molding to mass produce recorders, which were sold to schools for a US dollar each (equivalent to $13 in 2025).

Recorders are also relatively easy to play at a basic level because sound production needs only breath, and pitch is primarily determined by fingering (although excessive breath pressure will tend to drive the pitch sharp).

Most Japanese students are taught to play the recorder.

== Recorder ensembles ==
The recorder is a very social instrument. Many recorder players participate in large groups or in one-to-a-part chamber groups, and there is a wide variety of music for such groupings including many modern works. Groups of different sized instruments help to compensate for the limited note range of the individual instruments. Four part arrangements with a soprano, alto, tenor and bass part played on the corresponding recorders are common, although more complex arrangements with multiple parts for each instrument and parts for lower and higher instruments may also be regularly encountered. A recorder carved from a carrot is a regular instrument in the London Vegetable Orchestra.

== See also ==
- List of recorder music
- List of recorder players
- Voice flute
