= Chiavette =

Chiavette (plural of Italian: chiavetta, [kjaˈvetta] "little clefs") is a system of standard combinations of clefs used in polyphonic music of the 16th through 18th centuries, differing from the usual chiavi naturali (the combination of soprano, alto, tenor, and bass clefs.) Typically, these clefs place each staff line a third lower than usual. (A second possible set of clefs, in contrabasso, places each staff line a third higher; this is less common outside of Franco-Flemish compositions.)

The first author to mention a standard set of high clefs is Silvestro Ganassi dal Fontego, in his 1543 Regula Rubertina, chapter 22, which instructs the musician to transpose such music down a fifth. Other theorists, such as Adriano Banchieri (1601) and Picerli (1631), indicate to transpose down a fifth if there is no key signature, and a fourth if there is a flat indicated. By mid-century, Italian commentators only mention a transposition down a fourth, and still later the practice seems to have been to transpose downward by a third to account for the high pitch of Italian organs. The Austrian theorist Johann Baptist Samber (1707), meanwhile, gave as his rule to transpose downward by a fourth if the bass is notated in F3, but a fifth if it is notated in C4.

The practice of transposition does not seem to have been universal; Thomas Morley implies that music ought to be sung in the key in which it was written while Michael Praetorius indicates the choice to transpose or not depends on the ensemble. Banchieri (1609) indicates that instrumental music should be read at pitch, in the higher clefs, while singers use the chiavi naturali at the written pitch.

This set of higher clefs was only given the name chiavette in the eighteenth century, by Girolamo Chiti (1718), by which time the practice itself had largely disappeared; by the mid-seventeenth century, most composers had adopted more flexible notational practices. It continued to linger in Rome, however, and was used at the papal chapel into the nineteenth century.

Performance of pieces written in chiavette approximately a fourth lower than notated often results in a more consistent set of ranges across a given collection, although this is not always reflected in modern performing editions and recordings.
