= Conrad Mollenhauer GmbH =

German recorder manufacturer

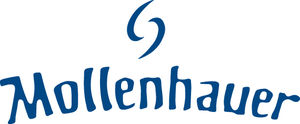
Conrad Mollenhauer GmbH logo

Conrad Mollenhauer GmbH (commonly called simply Mollenhauer) is a leading German manufacturer of recorders.

The company was founded in 1822 by Johann Andreas Mollenhauer (1798–1871) in Fulda. In 1961, Bernhard Mollenhauer took over the business.

The company produces recorders for beginners and handmade instruments for soloists. In an effort to develop a renaissance-style recorder for use by beginners, Adriana Breukink developed the Adri's Dream recorder in collaboration with Mollenhauer in 1999. This line was later expanded to include Dream Edition recorders for more advanced players.
