= List of recorder players =

A recorder player is a musician who plays the recorder, a woodwind musical instrument. The recorder is used as a teaching instrument and has a large amateur following. Because of its ubiquity in these regards, the number of people who can play it in some capacity is enormous.

This article consists of four alphabetical lists of people whose notability is established by reliable sources in other Wikipedia articles: first, professional recorder players notable for their playing; second, professional ensembles of recorder players; third, people who have played the recorder in notable works; and fourth, amateur players of the recorder who are otherwise notable.

== List of professional recorder players ==
- Aldo Abreu
- Piers Adams (born 1963)
- Giovanni Antonini (born 1965)
- Rachel Begley
- Vicki Boeckman (born 1955)
- Kees Boeke (born 1950)
- Erik Bosgraaf (born 1980)
- Adriana Breukink
- Drora Bruck (born 1966)
- Daniël Brüggen (born 1958)
- Frans Brüggen (1934–2014)
- Jacob van Eyck (c. 1590–1657)
- Capilla Flamenca
- Arnold Dolmetsch (1858–1940)
- Bertho Driever (born 1953)
- Horacio Franco (born 1963)
- Walter van Hauwe (born 1948)
- Peter Holtslag (born 1957)
- Lucie Horsch (born 1999)
- Friedrich von Huene (1929–2016)
- Edgar Hunt (1909–2006)
- Jorge Isaac (born 1974)
- Ricardo Kanji (born 1948)
- Erich Katz (1900–1973)
- Jill Kemp (born 1979)
- Hans Maria Kneihs (born 1943)
- Bernard Krainis (1924–2000)
- Barthold Kuijken (born 1949)
- Genevieve Lacey (born 1972)
- Dan Laurin (born 1960)
- Paul Leenhouts (born 1957)
- Hans-Martin Linde (born 1930)
- Matthias Maute (born 1963)
- Fred Morgan (1940–1999)
- David Munrow (1942–1976)
- Dorothee Oberlinger (born 1969)
- Michala Petri (born 1958)
- Philip Pickett (born 1950)
- Barnaby Ralph (born 1969)
- Gwyn Roberts
- Pete Rose (1942–2018)
- Tali Rubinstein (born 1984)
- Michael Schneider (born 1953)
- Ashley Solomon
- Hans Ulrich Staeps (1909–1988)
- Karel van Steenhoven (born 1958)
- Maurice Steger (born 1971)
- Stefan Temmingh (born 1978)
- Linda Turbett
- John Turner (born 1943)
- Marion Verbruggen (born 1950)

== List of professional recorder ensembles ==
- Amsterdam Loeki Stardust Quartet
- B-Five Recorder Consort
- Flanders Recorder Quartet
- The Royal Wind Music
- Sour Cream
- Quartet New Generation
- Seldom Sene

== List of musicians who have used the recorder ==
- Gary Brooker and Matthew Fisher of Procol Harum played the recorder on the track "Boredom" on their third album, "A Salty Dog".
- Emma Christian, native Manx Gaelic singer and folk artist plays the recorder in place of the more traditional tin whistle.
- Dido studied recorder at the junior department of London's Guildhall School of Music & Drama and most famously plays it on the track Thank You from her debut album No Angel
- Jimi Hendrix played soprano recorder in some of his studio recordings
- Richard Harvey (of Gryphon originally)
- Bob Homme used the recorder as part of his children's TV show, The Friendly Giant
- Keith Jarrett played recorder on his album The Survivors' Suite
- Billy Joel played the recorder on Cold Spring Harbor.
- Brian Jones (Rolling Stones) notably played the recorder in the song Ruby Tuesday
- John Paul Jones (Led Zeppelin) played several recorders in the studio recording of Stairway to Heaven
- Rahsaan Roland Kirk featured the recorder on several of his recordings.
- Terry Kirkman of the Association frequently played recorder on Windy, "Along Comes Mary", etc.
- Sarah Martin (of Belle and Sebastian)
- Paul McCartney (The Beatles) occasionally uses the recorder in his music (e.g. The Fool on the Hill)
- Chisato Moritaka plays the recorder solo on her song "Watarasebashi"
- Carlos Núñez Muñoz
- Steve Page of the Barenaked Ladies played the recorder on "Helicopters" on their album "Maroon (album)"
- Les Penning played recorders on Mike Oldfield's album Ommadawn, the singles "Portsmouth", "In Dulce Jubilo" and "Cuckoo Song" and also on the track "Argiers"
- Mick Ronson, glam-rock guitarist, producer and arranger played multi-tracked recorders on David Bowie's "Life on Mars?" and on Lou Reed's "Satellite of Love"
- Bon Scott played recorder during his pre-AC/DC career in the band Fraternity
- Pete Seeger would occasionally play recorder, ofter in his improvisations.
- Grace Slick from Jefferson Airplane played the recorder on the albums Surrealistic Pillow (most notably in "Comin' Back to Me" and "How Do You Feel"), After Bathing at Baxter's and Volunteers.
- Bruce Springsteen plays recorder on some of his tracks
- Sufjan Stevens
- Roy Wood from The Move would play recorder frequently on The Move's albums.

== List of notable amateur recorder players ==
- James Dean apparently learnt to play Bach on the recorder
- Umberto Eco, Italian novelist, author of The Name of the Rose
- Rasmus Fleischer
- Paul Hindemith
- Imogen Holst
- Samuel Pepys
- Jef Raskin, 'Father of the Macintosh'
- George Bernard Shaw
- Richard Stallman
- Patrick Troughton, who often played while in character as the Second Doctor in Doctor Who
- Sarah Vowell
- Rainn Wilson who also plays the recorder while in character as Dwight Schrute in The Office
- Bonnie Wright
