= List of women classical flautists =

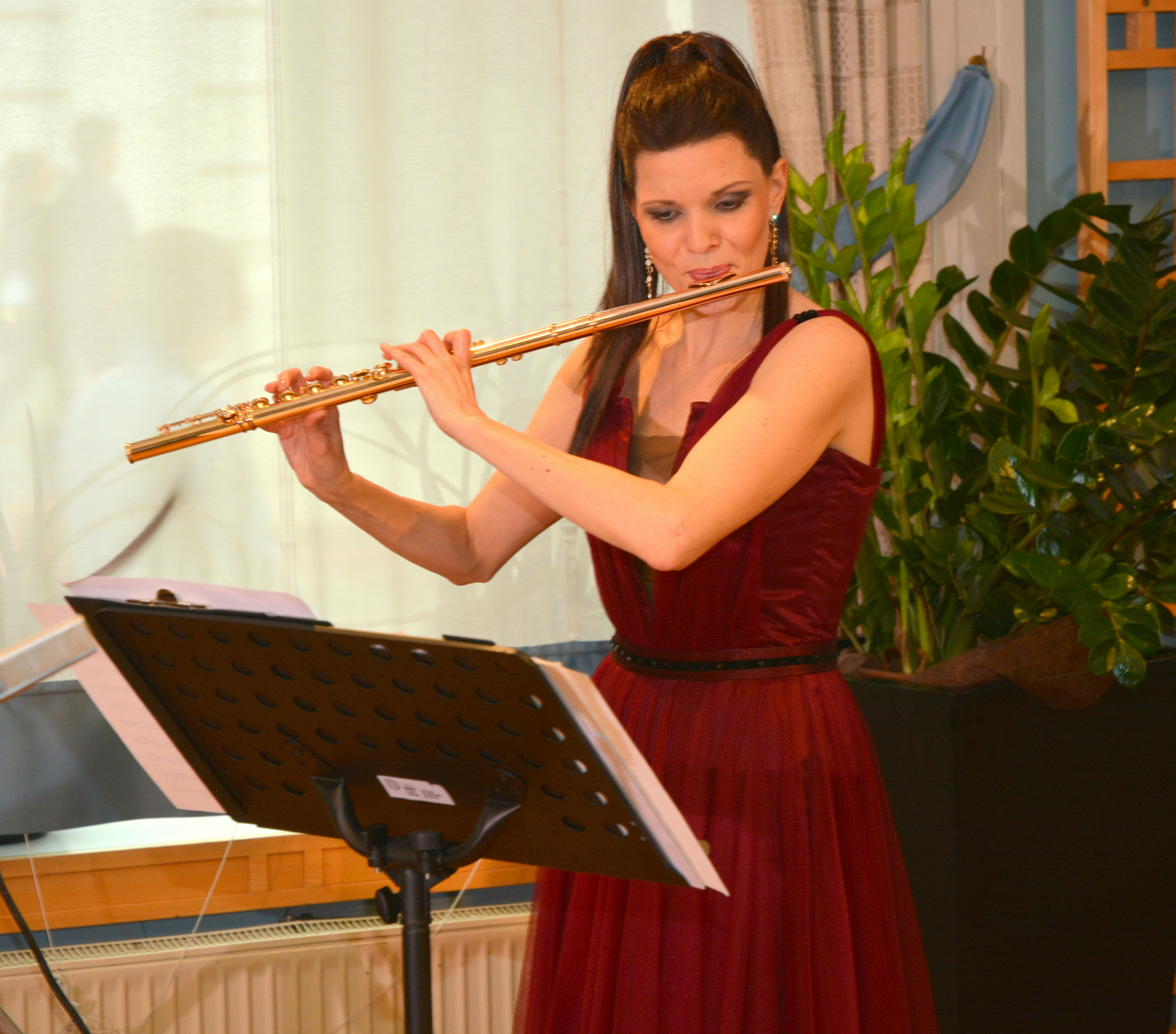
Anja Burnik playing in 2016

The following is a list of women classical flautists by nationality – notable women who are well known for their work in the field of classical music.

== Australia ==
- Jane Rutter (born 1958), classical and jazz flautist, chamber musician
- Linda Vogt (1922–2013), classical and jazz flautist, educator

== Chile ==
- Viviana Guzmán (born 1964), prominent soloist, composer and recording artist

== Denmark ==
- Ulla Miilmann (born 1972), principal flautist of the Danish National Symphony Orchestra
- Michala Petri (born 1958), recorder virtuoso, broadcaster and recording artist

== France ==
- Patricia Lavail (born 1962), recorder player and educator
- Sarah Louvion (born 1976), award-winning classical flautist, soloist and chamber musician

== Germany ==
- Dorothee Oberlinger (born 1969), recorder player, soloist, chamber musician, recording artist and educator
- Dorothea Winter (1949–2012), recorder player, chamber musician and educator

== Hungary ==
- Noémi Győri (born 1983), soloist, chamber musician, recording artist and educator

== India ==
- Rasika Shekar (born 1989), Indo-American flautist who plays the classical Indian bansuri

== Israel ==
- Drora Bruck (born 1966), recorder player, soloist, chamber musician and educator
- Tamar Lalo (born 1984), recorder player specializing in early music, now based in the Netherlands
- Sharon Bezaly (born 1972), flute player, soloist, now based in Sweden

== Japan ==
- Ayako Takagi (born 1977), soloist, recitalist, recording artist and academic

== Korea ==
- Jasmine Choi (born 1983), Korean-born, educated in the U.S., living currently in Austria; soloist and recording artist

== Mexico ==
- Elena Duran (born 1949), Mexican-American flautist, concerto appearances and recordings with major orchestras

== Netherlands ==
- Eleonore Pameijer (born 1960), soloist, recitalist and artistic director
- Kathinka Pasveer (born 1959), classical flautist and educator
- Abbie de Quant (born 1946), soloist, recording artist and educator
- Marion Verbruggen (born 1950), leading recorder soloist, chamber musician and conductor

== Norway ==
- Ingrid Søfteland Neset (born 1992), award-winning classical flautist
- Gro Sandvik (born 1942), soloist and chamber music performer

== Poland ==
- Jadwiga Kotnowska (born 1957), soloist, recitalist, recording artist and chamber musician

== Serbia ==
- Sanja Stijačić (born 1965), soloist, chamber musician and academic

== Slovenia ==
- Irena Grafenauer (born 1957), soloist, chamber musician and educator

== Switzerland ==
- Caroline Charrière (1960–2018), composer, conductor, flautist, chamber musician and educator

== Turkey ==
- Şefika Kutluer (born 1961), award-winning soloist and Baroque specialist

== United Kingdom ==
- Rachel Begley (fl. 1990s), recorder and Baroque bassoon virtuosi now based in New York
- Lisa Beznosiuk (born 1956), flautist specializing in Baroque and historical works
- Laura Cannell (fl. 2000s), composer, recorder player, violinist and broadcaster
- Marianne Davies (1743 or 1744 – c. 1818), flutist, singer, harpsichordist, and glass harmonica player
- Lorna McGhee (born 1972), Scottish flutist and educator, chamber musician
- Susan Milan (born 1947), classical performer, composer and academic
- Hilary du Pré (born 1942), flautist and memoirist

== United States ==
- Jeanne Baxtresser (born 1947), recitalist, concerto soloist, chamber musician, educator and recording artist
- Frances Blaisdell (1912–2009), early American professional flautist and educator
- Vicki Boeckman (born 1955), recorder player, performer and educator
- Claire Chase (born 1978), recitalist, recording artist and arts entrepreneur
- Valerie Coleman (fl. 1997), flautist and composer contributing to chamber music
- Elena Duran (born 1949), Mexican-American flautist, concerto appearances and recordings with major orchestras
- Cynthia Folio (born 1954), composer, flutist, music theorist and academic
- Jeanne Galway (born 1955), American-born flautist and educator now based in Switzerland
- Marianne Gedigian (fl. 1990s), recitalist, principal flute of major orchestras
- Katherine Hoover (1937–2018), composer, flutist, music theorist and educator
- Catherine Ransom Karoly (fl. 1990s), principal flute and soloist, chamber musician
- Anne La Berge (born 1955), flutist and composer now based in Amsterdam
- Anne McGinty (born 1945), flutist, composer and music publisher
- Marina Piccinini (born 1968), Italian-American virtuoso flautist specializing in Mozart and Bach
- Amy Porter (fl. 1990s), soloist, chamber musician and educator
- Gwyn Roberts (fl. 1990s), recorder and traverso soloist, chamber musician and educator
- Paula Robison (born 1941), soloist and music educator
- Mindy Rosenfeld (fl. 1980s), flautist, piper and harpist
- Elaine Shaffer (1925–1973), principal flautist, soloist and chamber musician
- Mimi Stillman (fl. 2000s), concert flutist, chamber musician and educator
- Carol Wincenc (born 1949), soloist, chamber musician and academic
- Eugenia Zukerman (born 1944), flute virtuoso, writer and journalist

== See also ==
- Lists of women in music
- Women in classical music
