= Jill Kemp =

British recorder player (born 1979)

Jill Kemp (born 24 November 1979, Yorkshire) is a British recorder player.

== Early life ==
Kemp attended Honley High School and took her A-levels at Greenhead College in Huddersfield. She studied at the Guildhall School of Music and Drama; Goldsmiths College, University of London and with Michala Petri and Piers Adams.

== Career ==
Kemp is a professional classical recorder player who holds the distinction of being the only recorder player to have won the Royal Over-Seas League's wind and brass competition in its 58-year history. In 2009 she made her Carnegie Hall debut as an IBLA Grand Prizewinner. She performs as a recitalist with harpsichord and piano accompaniment throughout the UK, Europe, the US and South Africa. She has performed with Baroque ensemble Red Priest. She is a panel member on the annual IBLA Grand Prize jury, has delivered masterclasses at venues throughout Europe and the US, and gives concerts and workshops for the Concordia Foundation. Kemp features on the soundtrack of the 2009 20th Century Fox release Fantastic Mr, Fox, Harry Potter and the Deathly Hallows - Part 1 and Part 2, and The Grand Budapest Hotel. Kemp's debut CD of 20th-century British recorder works including repertoire by Gordon Jacob, York Bowen and Malcolm Arnold, with the pianist Aleksander Szram and the Brodowski quartet, was released in 2013. She has appeared on television in Italy, Poland and the US, and has broadcast on Classic FM and the BBC. She has featured in Classic FM, Muso, Classical Music and Music Teacher magazines. Kemp has given masterclasses at Dartington International Summer School, Wroclaw School of Music, the University of North Dakota and Keiskamma Trust in the Eastern Cape. In 2004 she launched an interactive education project Recorder Revolution. Kemp has also worked as an actor-musician, including notably with the Manchester-based company Feelgood Theatre Productions, when she played Hermia in A Midsummer Night's Dream, Mina in Dracula and Nimue in Arthur – King of the Britons. She appeared in the 2009 Eloquent Protest concert at London's Duke of York's Theatre, alongside Samuel West, Janie Dee and Clive Rowe.

== Discography ==
- The Grand Budapest Hotel - Original Soundtrack (ABKCO, 2014)
- Jill Kemp & Aleksander Szram/Brodowski Quartet: English Recorder Works (MMC Records, 2013)
- Harry Potter and the Deathly Hallows Part 1 (WaterTower Music, 2010)
- The Fantastic Mr Fox - Original Soundtrack (ABKCO, 2009)
