= Aldo Abreu =

Venezuelan recorder player

Aldo Abreu is a Venezuelan recorder player currently residing in the United States.

== Life and career ==
Born in Caracas, Venezuela to famous harpsichordist Abraham Abreu and Janet Foxton, Abreu holds the Performer's and Teacher's Diplomas from the Royal Conservatory in The Hague, and a master's degree from Indiana University in Bloomington. His teachers have included Ricardo Kanji, Michael Barker, and Scott Martin Kosofsky. He lives in the Boston area and is a member of the faculties of the New England Conservatory, the Boston Conservatory, Boston University, and the Amherst Early Music Festival.

== Awards ==
He is the First Prize Winner of the 1992 "Concert Artists Guild Competition" (New York), as well as a laureate of the competition Musica Antiqua Bruges and the "Premio Flauto Dolce" (Germany).

== Performances ==
Abreu has toured throughout the United States, Europe, New Zealand, Central America, and his native Venezuela, and has been featured at the 1993 and 1996 Spoleto Festivals in the United States and Italy, the OK Mozart Festival, the Boston Early Music Festival, and the Festival Music Society in Indianapolis. He has appeared as a concerto soloist and chamber musician with both modern and historical instruments, with many orchestras throughout the United States. Abreu has also explored the rich, but rarely heard, music by Latin American composers of the Baroque and Contemporary periods. He is a frequent guest of the American Bach Soloists in California, both on stage and in their recordings for the Koch International label. Abreu frequently performs contemporary works for the recorder, among them:

- The Kid from Venezuela, by composer Pete Rose
- Echoes and Shadows, by Christopher Cook
- Concerto for Recorder and Orchestra, commissioned from Ricardo Lorenz by Concert Artists Guild
- Concerto for Recorders and Orchestra, by Lawrence Weiner
