= Derek Simpson =

Derek Simpson may refer to:

- Derek Simpson (cellist) (1928–2007), English cellist
- Derek Simpson (trade unionist) (born 1944), British trade union leader
