= Richard Stone (lutenist) =

American performer of early music

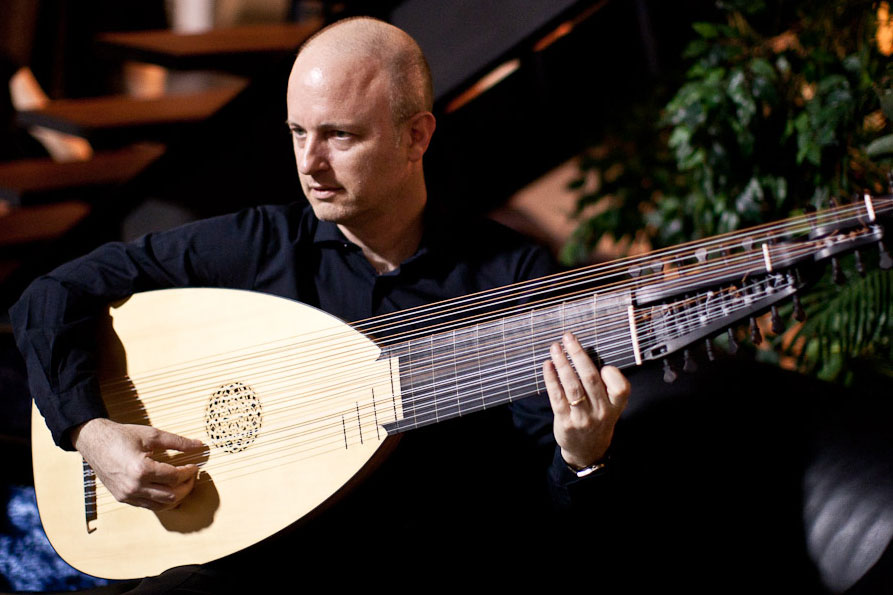

Background information
- Born: 1960 (age 65–66); Greenfield, Massachusetts
- Genres: Baroque
- Occupations: Musician, music director, educator
- Instruments: Lute, theorbo
- Years active: 1984–present
- Labels: Titanic; Chandos
- Spouse: Gwyn Roberts (m. 1994)

Richard Stone is an American lutenist, music director, educator and music editor. He performs on lute and theorbo as a soloist and accompanist; he and Gwyn Roberts co-founded and co-direct Tempesta di Mare Philadelphia Baroque Orchestra; his musical editions are published by AR Editions and Prima la Musica; and he lectures and teaches lute, theorbo, continuo and performance practice for singers and instrumentalists at the Peabody Conservatory of The Johns Hopkins University.

== Early life and studies ==
Richard Stone was born in Greenfield, Massachusetts in 1960. He began classical guitar lessons in his hometown with composer Joseph Marchello starting at age 14. He attended the Conservatory of Music at the State University of New York at Purchase to study guitar with David Starobin and lute with Patrick O’Brien, while being mentored by pianist Seymour Bernstein. In 1984 he was awarded a Fulbright Lusk Memorial Fellowship to begin theorbo and pursue further lute studies with Nigel North at the Guildhall School of Music and Drama in London, in which city he began his early professional career. Stone resettled in New York City in 1989, resuming lessons with Patrick O’Brien while receiving mentoring from musician and scholar Paul C. Echols. In 1994 he married recorder player and baroque flutist Gwyn Roberts, and moved to Philadelphia, Pennsylvania, where the two have resided since.

== Career ==
As performer, Stone has continued giving solo lute and theorbo recitals and collaborating in other artists’ and organizations’ projects since the move to Philadelphia. Highlights of these activities include two-seasons performing the complete Bach solo lute suites and engagements as concerto soloist with Apollo’s Fire, Les Idées Heureuses, and the Handel and Haydn Society; performances with vocal artists Christine Goerke, Lorraine Hunt, Julianne Baird, Christine Brandes, Jeffrey Thomas and Drew Minter; and freelance projects with the Philadelphia Orchestra, the Boston Symphony Orchestra, Orpheus Chamber Orchestra, New York Collegium and the Mark Morris Dance Group.

As music director, Stone served as Acting Music Co-Director of NYSBaroque in Ithaca, New York in the 2000–2001 season and has guest-directed projects for other organizations. Afterwards he co-founded the Tempesta di Mare Philadelphia Baroque Orchestra, together with Gwyn Roberts, which launched its series in the 2002–2003 season and continues to the present. He and Roberts co-direct the ensemble.

As educator, Stone serves on the Conservatory faculty at the Peabody Institute of the Johns Hopkins University in Baltimore, Maryland as Professor of Lute and Theorbo, a post he has held since 2007. He was the 2014 Patrick O’Brien Lecturer for the Lute Society of America, focusing on the operation of classical rhetorical principles in lute music of the baroque era. He was guest lecturer at the 2009 forum Perspectivas: Simposio sobre renacimiento y barroco at the Universidad de los Andes, Bogotá, Colombia, on approaches to reconstructing music that survives in fragmentary condition. Stone led the baroque ensemble at Swarthmore College from 1999 to 2005 has taught for Amherst Early Music and the Lute Society of America.

As music editor, Stone’s edition of the complete Weiss lute concerti, which he reconstructed based on the surviving lute parts, is published by A-R Editions, Middleton, Wisconsin. His editions of orchestral music by Johann Friedrich Fasch are published by Prima la Musica, Abroath, Scotland, United Kingdom, and Ortus Musikverlag, Berlin, Germany, has published an edition of music by Johann Gottlieb Janitsch edited by Stone.

== Recordings ==
Stone’s performances with Tempesta di Mare are carried regularly on National Public Radio’s Performance Today. Recording and broadcast credits include Deutsche Grammophon, Chandos, Lyrichord, PGM, Musical Heritage, Polygram, Vienna Modern Masters, ATMA, Eklecta, Centaur, Bis, Chesky, NPR, Czech Radio 3-Vltava and the BBC.

Title	Release details
Lute Works of Silvius Leopold Weiss	1993, Titanic, TI-213
Veracini: The Recorder Sonatas, vol. 1	November 1996, PGM
Weiss: Lute Concerti	May 2004, CHAN 0707
Handel: Flaming Rose	July 2007, CHAN 0743
Fasch: Orchestral Music, vol.1	April 2008, CHAN 0751
Scarlatti: Cantatas and Chamber Music	April 2010, CHAN 0768
Fasch: Orchestral Music, vol.2	October 2011, CHAN 0783
Fasch: Orchestral Music, vol.3	September 2012, CHAN 0791
Mancini: Solos for a Flute	March 2014, CHAN 801
Bach: Six Trio Sonatas	May 2014, CHAN 0803
Comédie et Tragédie, vol. 1	January 2015, CHAN 805
Comédie et Tragédie, vol. 2	TBA 2016, CHAN
