= List of honorary graduates of the University of Chichester =

List of notable people who have received an honorary degree from the University of Chichester.

== 2010s ==
Name	Degree	Year	Ref.
Chi-chi Nwanoku	Doctor of Music	2018	
Hope Powell	Doctor of Sport	2018	
Herbie Blash	Doctor of Business Administration	2018	

== 2020s ==
Name	Degree	Year	Ref.
Donna Ockenden	Doctor of Science	2024	
Hugh Bonneville	Doctor of Theatre	2024	
Sue Campbell	Doctor of Sport	2024	
David Sedaris	Doctor of Literature	2025	
Piers Adams	Doctor of Music	2025	
Russ Cook	Master of Sport	2025	
