= Deutscher Musikwettbewerb =

Classical music competition

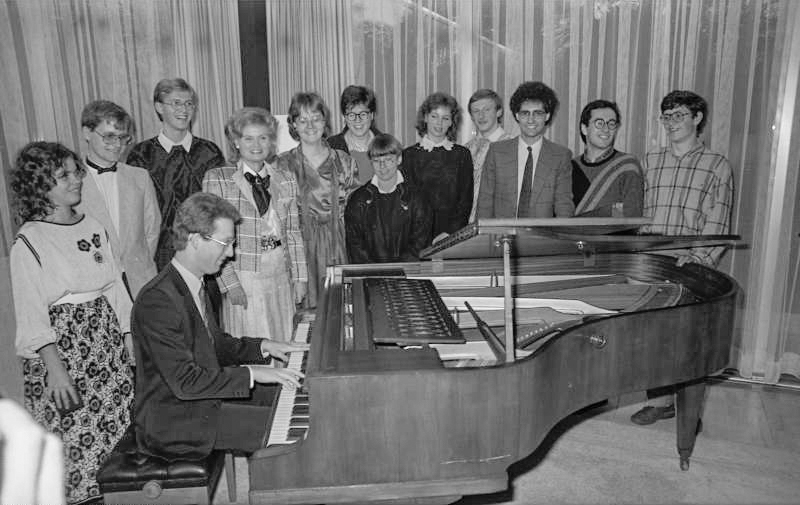
Award winners from 1986 and Hannelore Kohl in the office of the German chancellor

The Deutscher Musikwettbewerb (German music competition; German: [ˈdɔʏtʃɐ muˈziːkvɛtbəˌvɛrp]) is a national music competition in Germany for classical soloists and chamber music ensembles held annually by the Deutscher Musikrat (German Music Council). It was first held in 1975 and is considered the most important competition for young musicians in Germany. The instrumental categories vary, and an extra prize is given for compositions. In even years the competition takes place in Bonn, where the Musikrat is based, and in the other years in a different German town.

Award winners not only receive monetary awards but also long-term sponsorship and support through the Musikrat, including the opportunity to perform in concerts, record CDs and recommendations to perform with orchestras as soloists.

== Recipients (selection) ==
1980

- Michael Tröster (guitar)

2002

- ensemble amarcord

2006

- Nils Mönkemeyer (viola)
- Nicholas Rimmer (piano accompanist)
- Quartet New Generation (recorder quartet)

2007

- Johannes Fischer (percussion)

2008

- Sonic.art

2009

- Byol Kang (violin)
- Boris Kusnezow (accompanist)

2011

- Miao Huang (piano)
- Lars Karlin (trombone)
- Trombone Unit Hannover (trombone octet)
- Julian Lembke, Benjamin Scheuer (composition)

2012

- Tobias Feldmann (violin)
- Rie Koyama (bassoon)
- Koryun Asatryan, Asya Fateyeva (saxophone)
- Duo Gerassimez (duo cello/piano)
- Daniel Moreira, Sascha Thiele (composition)

2013

- Jonas Palm, Janina Ruh (cello)
- Rubén Durá de Lamo (tuba)
- Sabrina Ma (percussion)
- Dominik Susteck, Kathrin Denner (composition)

2014

- Frank Dupree (piano)

2015

- Wies de Boevé (double bass)
- Bettina Aust (clarinet)
- Damian Scholl (composition)

2016

- Katharina Konradi (soprano)
- Raphaela Gromes, Valentino Worlitzsch (cello)
- Simon Höfele (trumpet)
- Constantin Hartwig (tuba)
- Tobias Klich, Tamon Yashima (composition)

2017

- Tillmann Höfs (French horn)
- Juri Schmahl (oboe)
- Elias Jurgschat, Steven Heelein (composition)

2018

- Ioana Cristina Goicea (violin)
- Theo Plath (bassoon)
- Maciej Frąckiewicz (accordion)
- Eliot Quartett (string quartet)
- Francesco Ciurlo, Ling-Hsuan Huang (composition)

2019

- Konstantin Krimmel (baritone)
- Sebastian Fritsch (cello)
- Friedrich Thiele (cello)

2021

- Max Volbers (recorder)
- Trio E.T.A. (piano trio)
- Trio Klangspektrum, Ensemble für Neue Musik
- Martín Donoso Vera (composition)
- Alireza Khiabani (composition)

2022

- Aurel Dawidiuk (organ)
- Lyuta Kobayashi (clarinet)
- Anne Luisa Kramb (violin)
- Marc L. Vogler (composition – Preis des Deutschlandfunks)
- Taehyun Ha (composition – Preis des DMW)

2023

- Philipp Schupelius (cello)
- Eva Zalenga (soprano)
- Patrick Schäfer (composition – Preis des Deutschlandfunks)
- Arwen Campbell (composition – Preis des DMW)

2024

- Amelio Trio (piano trio)

2025

- Julian Emanuel Becker (organ)
- Moë Dierstein (violin)
- Benjamin Günst (violin)
- Robert Neumann (piano)

2026

- Constantin Heise (cello)
- Joscha Kremsler (clarinet)
- Pedro Rosenthal Campuzano (composition – Preis des Deutschlandfunks)
