= Turbett =

Turbett may refer to:

- Turbett Township, Pennsylvania, a township in Juniata County, Pennsylvania, United States.
- Philip Turbett, the British bassoonist and clarinetist.
- Linda Turbett, the British recorder player and oboist
