= Howard Beach (harpsichordist) =

British musician

Howard Beach (born 10 December 1966) is a British harpsichord player and previously a member of baroque group Red Priest.

Howard has performed and recorded extensively on both harpsichord and piano as a continuo player and concerto soloist. He has performed with artists including Les Arts Florissants, the Apollo Chamber Orchestra and the London Mozart Players at concert halls throughout Europe, Canada, and the Far East, as well as many UK venues.

Beach has been working with Piers Adams, recorder player from Red Priest since 1989. As well as giving recitals, they hold "Recorder Roadshows" around the country which include master classes and workshops for children, combined with a concert performance of specially written works.

Beach broadcasts frequently on radio, and has been consultant and performer for programmes on UK's Channel 4.
