= Tempesta di Mare Philadelphia Baroque Orchestra =

American symphony orchestra

- Orchestra
- Short name: Tempesta di Mare
- Founded: 1996; 30 years ago
- Location: Philadelphia, Pennsylvania, U.S.
- Concertmaster: Emlyn Ngai
- Website: tempestadimare.org
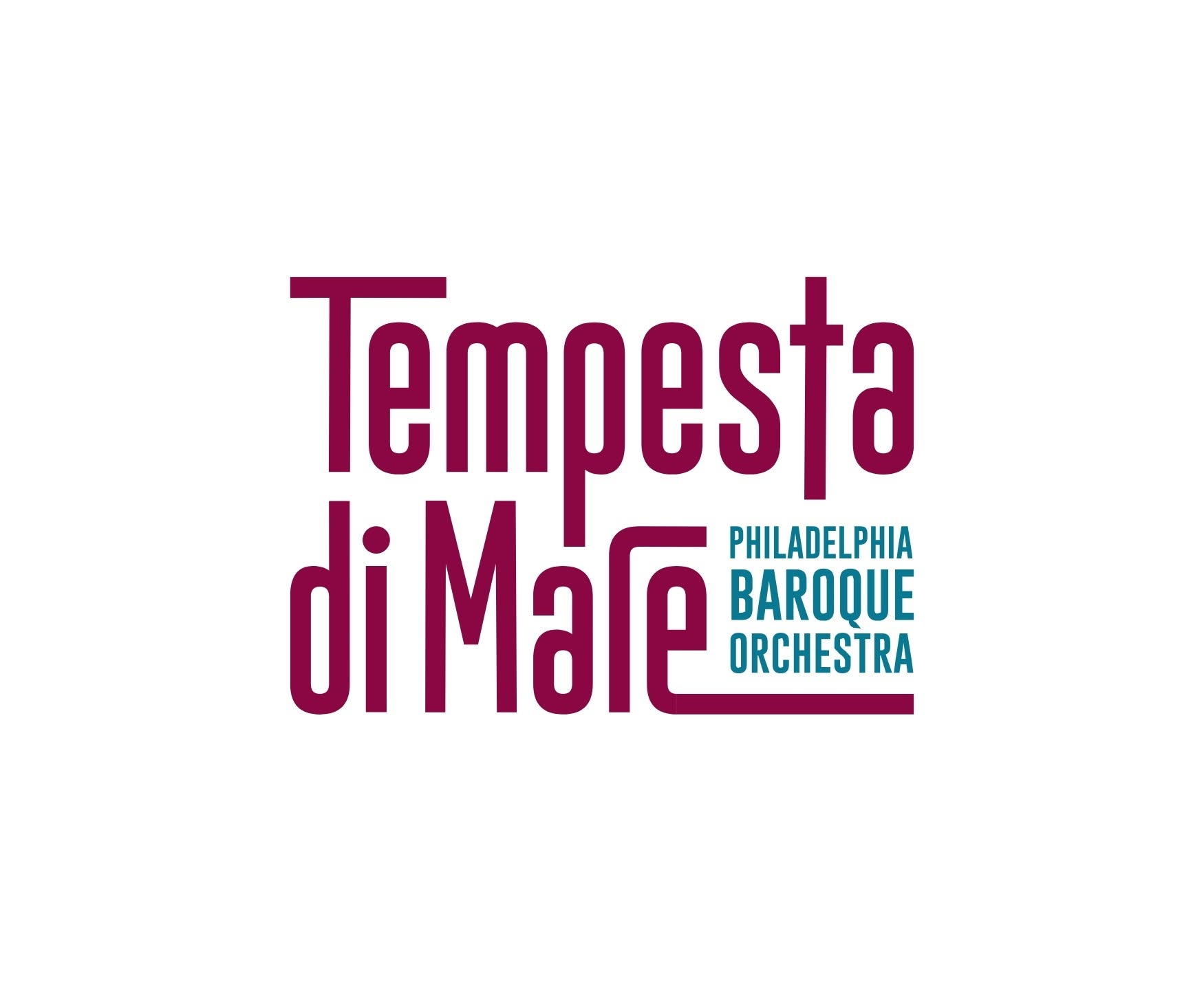

The Tempesta di Mare Philadelphia Baroque Orchestra is an American symphony orchestra based in Philadelphia, Pennsylvania, United States.

Founded in 1996 by Gwyn Roberts and Richard Stone, and re-established in 2006 as an exclusively baroque orchestra. It specializes exclusively in Baroque music, and the orchestra only has Baroque instruments.

The Philadelphia Baroque Orchestra Tempesta di Mare has received international acclaim. It has been featured in several BBC broadcasts. Its recordings have also received excellent reviews from BBC Music Magazine. The orchestra has a recording agreement with the British record label Chandos Records.

The orchestra directors are Gwyn Roberts and Richard Stone, and the concertmaster is Emlyn Ngai. Juan Gallastegui is the executive director.

== History ==
The orchestra was founded in 1996 by musicians Gwyn Roberts and Richard Stone, as co-founders and currently co-directors of the orchestra. In 2006 the orchestra was re-founded as an orchestra exclusively dedicated to European baroque music. Tempesta di Mare specializes exclusively in Baroque music, and the orchestra only has Baroque instruments. The ensemble performs baroque repertoire ranging from staged opera to chamber music. The orchestra was named in honor of the flute concerto La tempesta di mare by Italian composer Antonio Vivaldi.

In 2017 backed by consecutive grants from the Pew Center for Arts & Heritage, the orchestra executes the Reclaiming Telemann initiative, a multidisciplinary exploration designed to re-contextualize Georg Philipp Telemann's contributions to orchestral music. In 2021, co-director Gwyn Roberts receives the national Thomas Binkley Award from Early Music America for excellence in early music leadership.

In 2023 the Philadelphia Baroque Orchestra Tempesta di Mare traveled to Germany to open the 17th International Fasch Festival in Zerbst. In recognition of the ensemble's role in the rediscovery and promotion of Johann Friedrich Fasch's work, Tempesta di Mare was awarded the city's Fasch Prize at the event. It was the first time that the award was awarded to a non-European ensemble.

In 2026, on the occasion of the 250th Anniversary of the independence of the United States, as a baroque orchestra, Tempesta di Mare was the orchestra in charge of performing the Soundtrack of Independence at the national anniversary event throughout the Greater Philadelphia area.

Philadelphia Baroque Orchestra Tempesta di Mare live performances have been broadcast nationally on programmes such as NPR Performance Today, SymphonyCast or Sunday Baroque. Live concert recordings are distributed worldwide via the European Broadcasting Union.

The orchestra has collaborated and recorded with acclaimed and award-winning artists such as ensembles like the multiple Grammy-winning The Crossing chamber choir, orchestral instrumentalists such as Grammy-winning violinist Mandy Wolman or opera singers such as Grammy-winning tenor James Reese, soprano Rebecca Myers, Grammy-winning mezzo-soprano Maren Montalbano, baritone Randall Scarlata or mezzo-soprano Meg Bragle.

The orchestra has a recording agreement with the British record label Chandos Records, being the only American baroque music group to record for the British label.

Tempesta di Mare supporters include the Pew Charitable Trusts, William Penn Foundation, Presser Foundation, and National Endowment for the Arts.

The orchestra directors are Gwyn Roberts and Richard Stone, and the concertmaster is Emlyn Ngai. The current executive director of the orchestra is Juan Gallastegui since 2026, taking over from Ulrike Shapiro who was in charge of the executive direction for more than twenty years, until her appointment as director of Concerto Köln.

== Executive director ==
- Juan Gallastegui (2026–present)
- Ulrike Shapiro (2006–2026)

== Recordings ==
- Lute concerti by Silvius Leopold Weiss (2004)
- Nine German Arias and other works by Handel (Flaming Rose, 2007)
- Cantatas and chamber music by Alessandro Scarlatti (2010)
- Orchestral works by Johann Friedrich Fasch (2008, 2011, and 2012)
- Sonatas by Francesco Mancini (2013)
- Trio sonatas by J.S. Bach (2013)
- Comédie et Tragédie of French baroque orchestral music for the theatre (2015 and 2016)
- Works by Johann Gottlieb Janitsch (2018)

== Awards ==
- 2023, Fasch Prize (City of Zerbst, Germany)
- National Endowment for the Arts Award
- BBC Music Magazine 5-Star Award

== See also ==
- Philadelphia Orchestra
- Yannick Nézet-Séguin
