= Jon Pareles =

American journalist (born 1953)

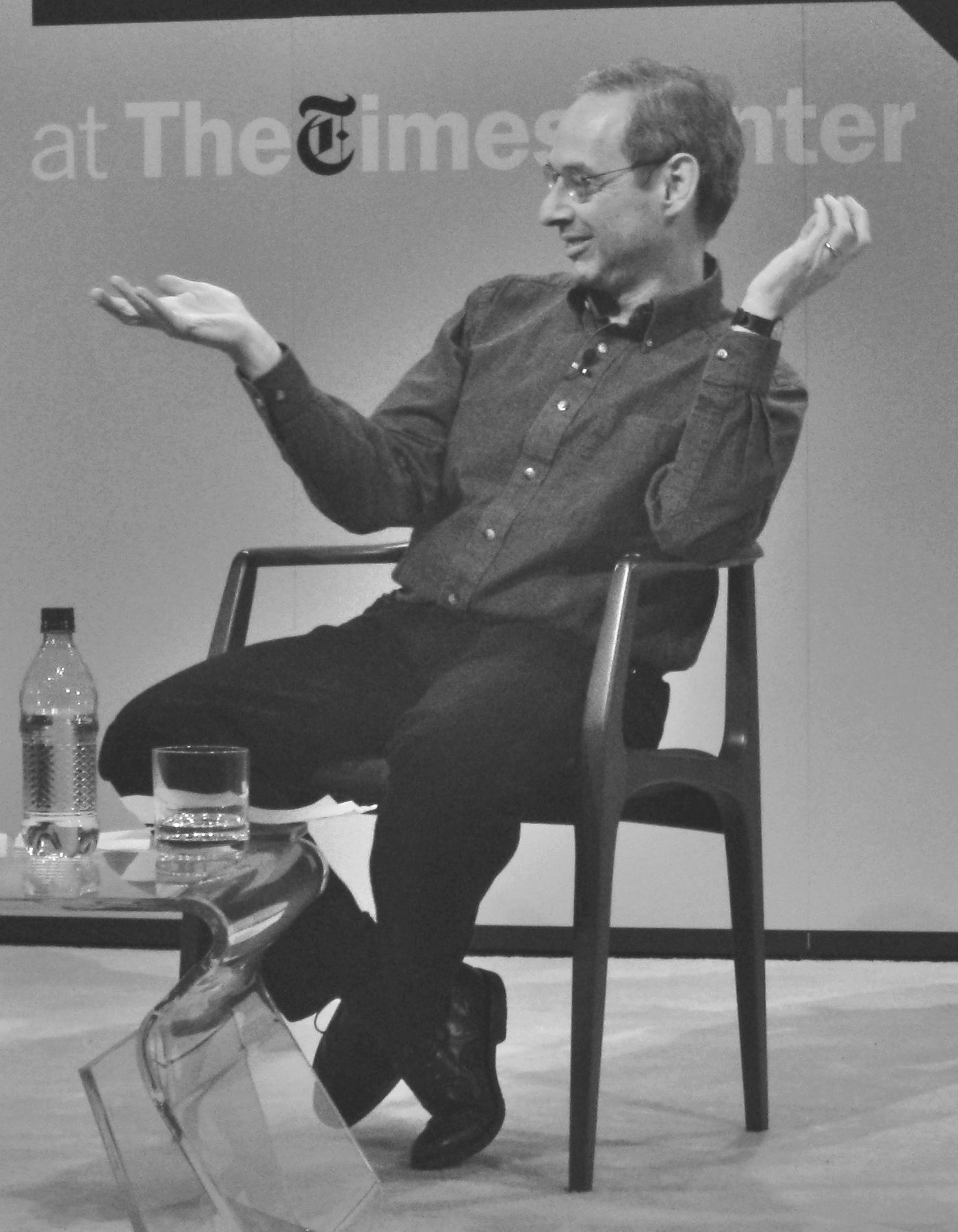
- Pareles in 2008
- Born: 1953 (age 72–73); Connecticut, U.S.
- Education: Yale University
- Occupation: Journalist

Jon Pareles (born 1953) is an American journalist. He was chief popular music critic in the arts section of The New York Times from 1988 to 2025.

== Early life and education ==
Pareles was born in Connecticut. He played jazz flute and piano, and graduated from Yale University in 1974 with a degree in music. While at Yale, he wrote on music for the newspaper, played the Harkness Tower carillon, and DJed for the radio station.

== Career ==
Pareles began working as a music critic in 1977. In the 1970s, he was an associate editor of Crawdaddy!, where he published his first works (outside school publications); and in the 1980s, an associate editor at Rolling Stone and the music editor at The Village Voice. He started contributing to The Times in 1982. He reviews popular music in the arts section of The Times, where from 1988 to 2025, he was chief pop music critic. In 2025, The Hollywood Reporter described him as "one of the most influential reviewers of the music business."

== Personal life ==
In 1994, Pareles married Mary Anne Cartelli, a lecturer in Chinese at Hunter College.

== Publications ==
- Pareles, Jon; Romanowski, Patricia, eds. (1983). The Rolling Stone Encyclopedia of Rock & Roll. London: Rolling Stone. ISBN 978-0-718-12400-7.
