= Barnaby Ralph =

British academic and virtuoso recorder player

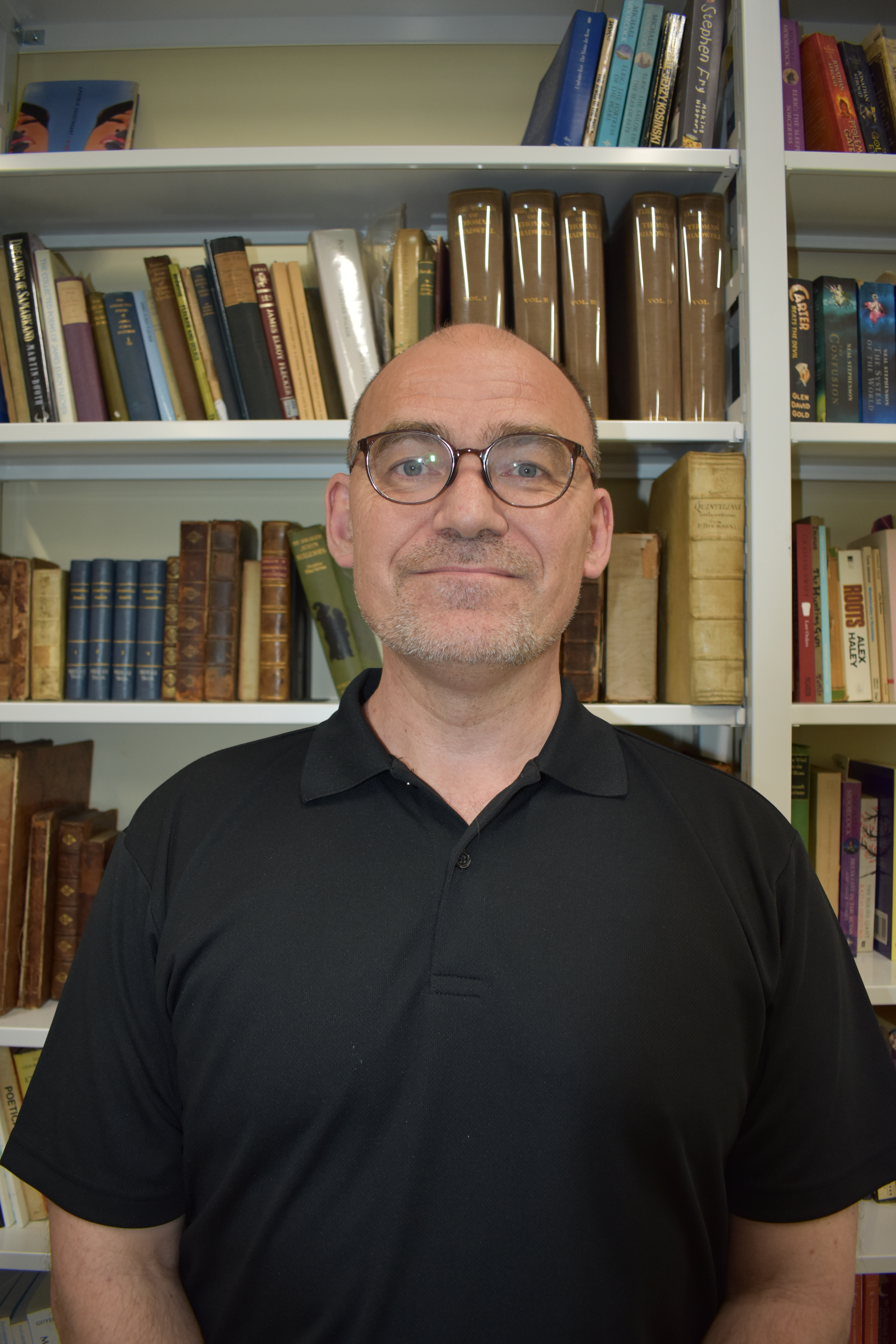
- Ralph in 2025
- Born: 14 October 1969 (age 56); London, England
- Education: University of Queensland
- Occupations: Musician; academic

Barnaby Ralph (born 14 October 1969 in London) is a British academic and professional recorder player.

Ralph has performed music in a wide range of styles, from medieval and baroque to post-avant garde. He has had contemporary works written for him by a number of well-known composers, including Betty Beath, Masturneh Nazarian, and Anika Mittendorf. His recording of Beath’s ‘Night Song’ appears on the disc 'American Dream' and the piece itself was dedicated to Barnaby Ralph.

== Academic career ==
Ralph studied with a number of teachers, including Rosalind Kelly and John Martin in Australia and Hans Maria Kneihs in Vienna. He received a Ph.D. from the University of Queensland. He is currently a professor in the Graduate School of Humanities and Sociology at the Hongo campus of the University of Tokyo, where he teaches English literature. Previously, he was a professor at Seikei University, Japan, where he taught British literature and culture.

In 2000, he was awarded the Postgraduate Association Medal of Excellence as the top Masters graduate from the Queensland Conservatorium of Music. Ralph has appeared worldwide on the concert stage as a soloist in chamber recitals, in orchestras, as well as on radio and television. His ongoing partnership with the Belgian harpsichordist Huguette Brassine has produced a recording of the sonatas of Francesco Barsanti that was released internationally by Naxos Records in 2006. The recording gained favourable reviews, and excerpts were played on Australian radio.

== Publications ==
With harpsichordist Huguette Brassine, Barnaby Ralph edited the score of Barsanti's Complete Original Recorder Sonatas, published by Dolce.

Ralph's review of harpsichordist Elizabeth Anderson's The Convict Harpsichordist was published in the journal, Early Music.

Ralph's teaching article "Modern recorder music, techniques and classroom applications" was published in Australian journal, Bulletin (Kodaly Music Education Institute of Australia).

With Kei Hibino and Henry Johnson, Ralph co-edited the book Music in the Making of Modern Japan (Palgrave, 2021).
