= Patricia Lavail =

French recorder player (born 1962)

Patricia Lavail (born 1962) is a French recorder player.

== Biography and career ==
Born in 1962, Patricia Lavail graduated from the Conservatoire de Strasbourg where she studied with Alain Sobczak. In 1987, she was the first French laureate of the Early Music International Competition of the MAfestival Brugge in the instrumental solo category.

She began teaching the recorder at the Conservatory of Saint-Cloud in her late teens, before directing the early music department.

As an instrumentalist, she collaborated with ensembles such as Capriccio Stravagante, Suonare Cantare, Opera Fuoco and Sesquitercia, exploring a repertoire from the Middle Ages to Baroque. She also has numerous contemporary world premieres to her credit, performing and recording for the first time works of Konstantin Miereanu, Daniel Tosi, Akira Tamba.

She is a founding member of Fuoco E Cenere with Jay Bernfeld and has appeared in every season of the ensemble since its creation

== Discography ==
=== With Fuoco E Cenere ===
- Fantasy in Blue, Purcell & Gershwin (2001)
- Boismortier – Suites, Sonatas & Concerto for Viola da Gamba (2002)
- Gentil Mia Donna – Petrarca e la musica (2004)
- Canta Napoli (2006)
- La Dafne – Marco da Gagliano (2008)
- Umana E Inumana – Alessandro Scarlatti, Francesco Durante (2010)
- Judith & Esther (2014)

=== With Suonare e Cantare ===
- Charpentier : Trois leçons de ténèbres pour basse-taille (1998)
- Madrigali e Altre Musiche Concertate, Tarquinio Merula (2000)

=== With Capriccio Stravagante ===
- Monteverdi e il suo Tempo (1991)
- Venezia Stravagantissima (2002)

=== With Opera Fuoco ===
- Jephtha, Haendel (2007)
