= Katharina Konradi =

Kyrgyzstani operatic soprano

- Born: Bishkek, Kyrgyz SSR, Soviet Union
- Education: Universität der Künste Berlin; Hochschule für Musik und Theater München
- Occupation: Operatic soprano
- Organizations: Hamburg State Opera
- Awards: Deutscher Musikwettbewerb
- Website: www.katharina-konradi.com

Katharina Konradi is a Kyrgyzstani/German operatic soprano based in Germany. She has performed at major opera houses, especially Sophie (Der Rosenkavalier), Gilda (Rigoletto) and Susanna (Le Nozze di Figaro). She is also known as a lieder singer with a broad repertoire including contemporary music, performed at Wigmore Hall in London among others, and has released multiple recordings.

== Career ==
Born in Bishkek, Konradi grew up in Kyrgyzstan, speaking Russian. She moved to Hamburg at age 15, not speaking any German and obtained her Abitur at the Johannes-Brahms-Schule in Pinneberg in 2009. She took singing lessons with Katja Pieweck, and then studied from to 2013 at the Universität der Künste Berlin, voice with Julie Kaufmann, contemporary Lied with Axel Bauni, and Lied interpretation with Eric Schneider, graduating with a Bachelor of Arts degree. She studied for her Master of Arts from 2014 to 2016 at the Hochschule für Musik und Theater München, voice with Christiane Iven and Lied with Donald Sulzen. She took masterclasses with Helmut Deutsch and Klesie Kelly-Moog. She first appeared on stage with the Kammeroper München from 2013, and at the Theater Hof from the 2014/15 season, where she first portrayed Anne Frank in Grigory Frid's mono-opera Das Tagebuch der Anne Frank.

Konradi was a member of the Hessisches Staatstheater Wiesbaden from 2015 to 2018, where she appeared in leading roles of the lyric soprano repertoire, including Pamina in Mozart's Die Zauberflöte, Gretel in Humperdinck's Hänsel und Gretel, Adele in Die Fledermaus by Johann Strauss, Susanna in Mozart's Le nozze di Figaro, Zerlina in Don Giovanni, and Nannetta in Verdi's Falstaff. After her performance as Ännchen in Weber's Der Freischütz at the Hamburg State Opera in 2017, she was engaged at the house from 2018. The same year, she first performed at the Semperoper in Dresden, as Zdenka in Arabella by Richard Strauss. The BBC has supported her from 2018 with the New Generation Artists scheme.

Konradi made her debut at the Bayreuth Festival in 2019 as Young Shepherd in Tannhäuser, directed by Tobias Kratzer, and a Flower Girl in Parsifal. In March 2019, she was presented in Rolando Villazón's television series for Arte, Stars von morgen (Stars of tomorrow). She first appeared at the Bavarian State Opera in 2021 as Sophie in Der Rosenkavalier by R. Strauss, directed by Barrie Kosky.

Konradi is focussed on lied repertoire from the classical period to contemporary, often collaborating with pianist Eric Schneider. She first performed at Wigmore Hall in London with pianist Joseph Middleton in 2020. Her solo CDs are dedicated to the art of lied. Her debut CD, after winning the Deutscher Musikwettbewerb, was a collection of songs by eight composers, accompanied by Gerold Huber. Titled Gedankenverloren (Lost in thought), it includes songs by Lili Boulanger, and three settings by Lori Laitman of children's poems written in Terezin ghetto.

In concert, she appeared in the opening concert of the 2017/18 season at the Elbphilharmonie, performing Beethoven's Lieder des Clärchens from his incidental music Egmont, with the NDR Elbphilharmonie Orchester conducted by Thomas Hengelbrock. In 2019, she performed the soprano solo in Mahler's Resurrection Symphony with the Bavarian Radio Symphony Orchestra and Chorus, conducted by Daniel Harding.

In the 2024/25 season, Katharina Konradi expands her operatic and concert activities with several engagements. She appeared as Oscar in a new production of Verdi's Un ballo in maschera at the Opernhaus Zürich, returned to the Bayerische Staatsoper in Munich as Adele in Die Fledermaus, and made her role debut as Gilda in Rigoletto at the Hamburg State Opera. She also appeared as Susanna in Mozart’s Le nozze di Figaro at Hamburg. On the concert stage, she performs Beethoven's Ninth Symphony with the Berliner Philharmoniker under Kirill Petrenko at the Easter Festival in Baden-Baden. In addition to these performances, she continues her recital work with multiple recitals throughout Europe.

In September of 2025, she joined Harrison Parrott for general management, and ended her fest contract with the Staatsoper Hamburg.

In her 2025/26 season, Konradi returns to the Semperoper Dresden as Pamina in Mozart’s Die Zauberflöte, sings Sophie in Der Rosenkavalier and Susanna in Le nozze di Figaro with the Wiener Staatsoper on tour in Japan, and reprises Sophie in concert at the Festspielhaus Baden-Baden. Her concert highlights include the London Symphony Orchestra’s season opener at the Barbican with Bernstein’s Symphony No. 3, Kaddish under Antonio Pappano; Bach’s Matthäus-Passion with the Tokyo Symphony Orchestra; Mahler’s Symphony No. 4 with the Deutsches Symphonie-Orchester in Berlin and Hamburg; Haydn’s Nelsonmesse with the Wiener Symphoniker; and Die Schöpfung with the Accademia Nazionale di Santa Cecilia. Konradi also presents recitals at Les Arts Valencia and the Concertgebouw in Amsterdam.

Her recording, “Un Cycle Imaginaire,” a collection of Lieder by Liszt with pianist Daniel Heide, was released by Universal Music in November 2025. Her latest recording, "Mahler ... Lieder der Jugend: Songs of youth and awakening" with pianist Joseph Middleton, mezzo-soprano Sophie Rennert, tenor Mauro Peter, and baritone Sir Simon Keenlyside was released on Signum Records in July 2026.

In June 2026, Konradi received her first Opus Klassik Award, winning the Solo Vocal Recording of the Year category for her album "Un Cycle Imaginaire", recorded with pianist Daniel Heide on CAvi Classics.

== Awards ==
- 2016: Deutscher Musikwettbewerb
- 2026: Opus Klassik Solo recording singing of the year

== Recordings ==
Year	Title	Repertoire / Description	Ensemble / Accompaniment	Label / Catalogue No.
2018	Gedankenverloren	Songs by Franz Schubert, Ernst Krenek, Richard Strauss, Manfred Trojahn, Claude Debussy, Lili Boulanger, Sergei Rachmaninoff, Lori Laitman	Gerold Huber (piano), Andreas Lipp (clarinet)	Genuin Classics — GEN 18490
2021	Liebende	Songs by Mozart, Strauss, Schubert	Daniel Heide (piano)	CAvi-Music — AVI 8553495
2022	Russian Roots	Russian chamber music & songs by Weinberg, Gubaidulina, Shostakovich, Rachmaninoff, etc.	Trio Gaspard	Chandos Records — CHAN 20278
2022	Mozart: Coronation Mass & Vesperae solennes de Dominica	Mozart sacred works including Krönungsmesseand Vesperae	Chor des Bayerischen Rundfunks, Akademie für Alte Musik Berlin, Howard Arman (conductor)	BR-Klassik — 900341
2022	Haydn: Die Schöpfung (The Creation)	Haydn’s oratorio The Creation	Gaechinger Cantorey, Hans-Christoph Rademann (conductor)	Accentus Music — ACC30580
2023	Insomnia	Schubert songs, exploring the theme of sleeplessness	Ammiel Bushakevitz (piano)	Berlin Classics — 0303049BC
2024	Echoes: Duets for Soprano, Mezzo-Soprano & Piano	Duets and songs by Brahms, Fauré, Chausson, Viardot, Saint-Saëns, Schumann, etc.	Catriona Morison (mezzo-soprano), Ammiel Bushakevitz (piano)	CAvi-Music — AVI 8553547
2024	Solitude	Songs by Hugo Wolf, Franz Schubert, Robert Schumann, György Kurtág, Eduard Toldrà, among others	Cosmos Quartet	Berlin Classics — 0303315BC
2025	Un Cycle Imaginaire	Songs by Franz Liszt	Daniel Heide (piano)	CAvi-music — 00028948680245
2026	Mahler ... Lieder der Jugend: Songs of youth and awakening	Gustav Mahler's early songs featuring works from his youthful Lieder alongside the complete Lieder eines fahrenden Gesellen.	Sophie Rennert (mezzo-soprano), Mauro Peter (tenor), Sir Simon Keenlyside (baritone), Joseph Middleton (piano)	Signum Classics – 635212100622

=== DVDs / Blu-rays ===
- Johann Strauss II: Die Fledermaus — Adele Bayerische Staatsoper; Vladimir Jurowski (cond.), Barrie Kosky (dir.). BSO Recordings, cat. BSOREC1005 — released 13 Sep 2024 on DVD (2 discs) and Blu-ray.
