= Julia Bishop =

English violinist

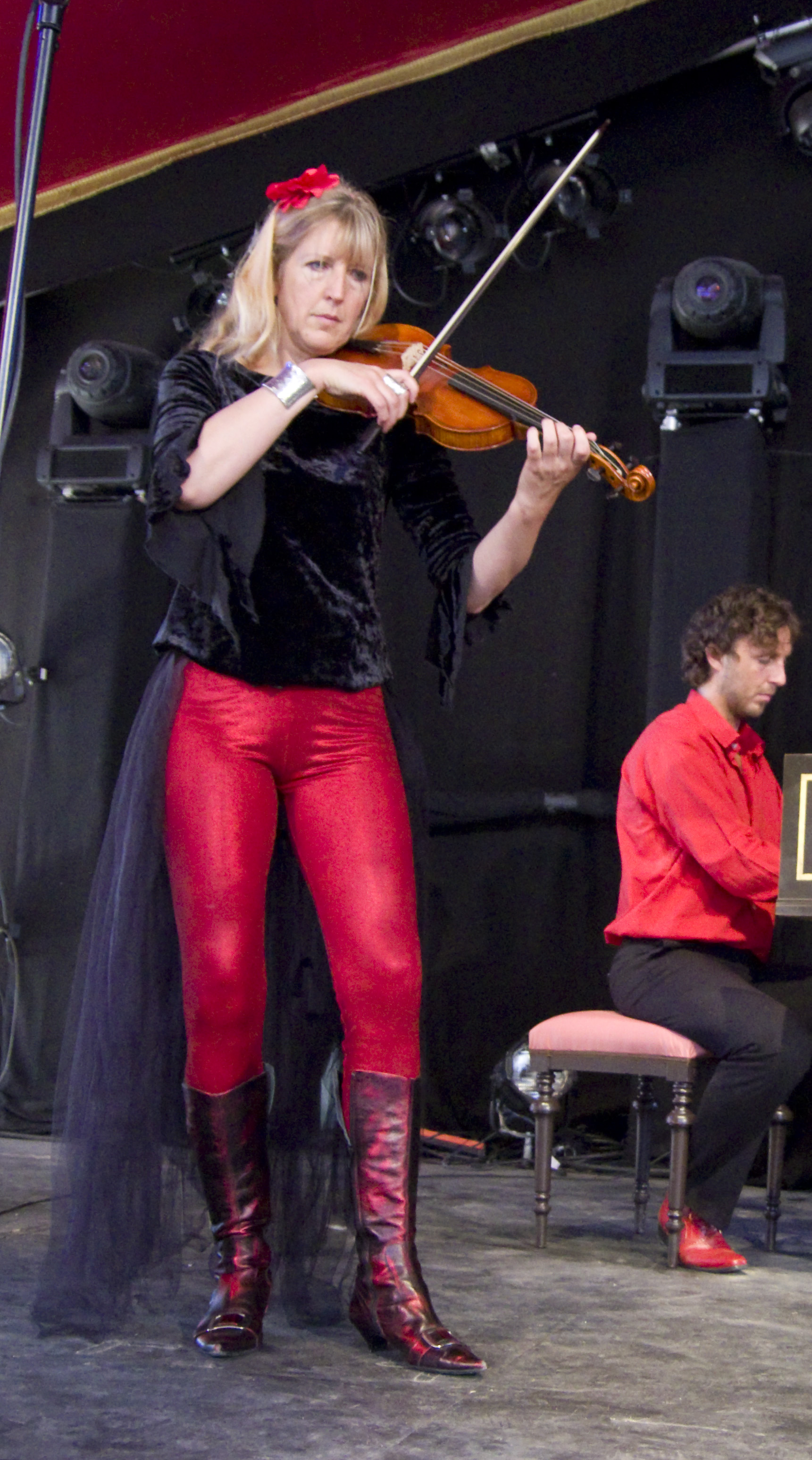
Red Priest (2015)

Julia Bishop is an English Baroque violin specialist. She was a member of The English Concert for six years, and has toured the world with most of the UK's leading period instrument orchestras. She has appeared as an orchestral leader and concerto soloist with the Gabrieli Consort, Brandenburg Consort, Florilegium early music ensemble and the Hanover Band. Bishop has taught baroque violin techniques at the Royal Academy of Music, London.

Bishop was a member of the Baroque group Red Priest. She was interviewed on the BBC Radio 4 program Woman's Hour in January 2006.
