= Angela East =

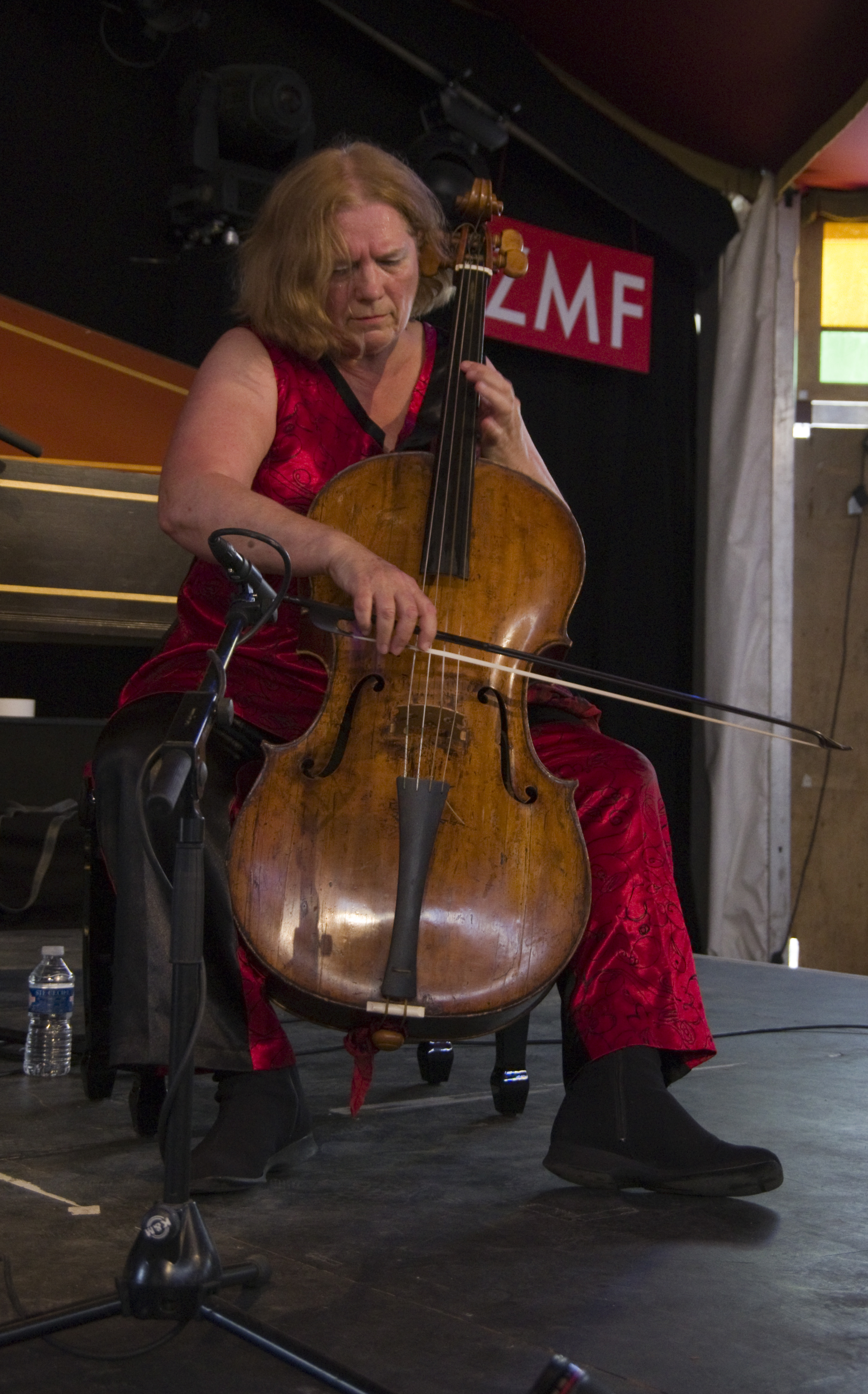
- East performing with Red Priest in 2015

Background information
- Genre: Baroque
- Occupation: Musician
- Instrument: Cello
- Website: www.angelaeast.co.uk

Angela East is a British cellist and member of baroque group Red Priest.

East won the Arts Council's Suggia Award at the age of 14 and continued her studies at the Royal Academy of Music under Derek Simpson and later with André Navarra and Christopher Bunting.

East's list of concert credits include La Scala, Milan, Sydney Opera House, Versailles and Glyndebourne as well as regular tours to Europe, Japan and USA with Red Priest.

She has given numerous concerto performances in London's Wigmore Hall and Queen Elizabeth Hall, and has performed as soloist and continuo cellist with many of Europe's leading baroque orchestras. In 1991 Angela formed "The Revolutionary Drawing Room" which performs chamber works from the revolutionary period in Europe on original instruments. The first eight CDs received glowing reviews worldwide.

== Discography ==
Solo

- Baroque Cello Illuminations - 2009
- Bach: The Cello Suites - 2009
