= Matthias Maute =

German Composer

Matthias Maute (born 1963) is a virtuoso recorder player and composer.

Maute was born in Ebingen, Germany and studied in Freiburg and Utrecht with Baldrick Deerenberg and Marion Verbruggen. In 1990 he won first prize in the soloist category of the competition Musica Antiqua Bruges, Belgium. He subsequently won the Dutch Impressariat Chamber Music Competition.

He has played with several chamber music groups, including REBEL Baroque Orchestra, and has made a number of recordings. He is the artistic director of Ensemble Caprice, which includes his wife and duo partner, Sophie Lariviere, who plays the recorder and traverso flute.

He is a professor at McGill University in Montreal and a member of Vox Saeculorum, a society of composers working in early historical styles.

Matthias Maute is artistic director and conductor of the professional choir Ensemble ArtChoral, artistic director of the Bach Society of Minnesota and co-artistic director of Montreal Baroque Festival.

Matthias Maute was Mécénat Musica Composer in residence from 2014 to 2018, composing 57 movements of Mécénat Musica Compositions for 113 emerging artists, featuring solo music, chamber music for ensembles and orchestral music with choir. 78 movements of Maute compositions are broadcast on the Mécénat Musica videoclip channel on YouTube

Matthias Maute was Mécénat Musica Ambassadeur en résidence from 2013 – 2022. Mécénat Musica Ambassador-in-Residence presents Mécénat Musica in the cultural community and helps cultural organizations join Mécénat Musica. The Ambassador encourages organizations to expand the circle of donors and to collaborate to create an in-perpetuity culture in the community. Matthias Maute's collaborative efforts have resulted in 15 cultural organizations joining Mécénat Musica.
