= Linda Vogt =

Linda Vogt AM
- Also known as: Linda Vogt Evans
- Born: Linda Caprice Vogt; 28 September 1922; Melbourne, Australia
- Died: 2 April 2013 (aged 90) Camperdown, Sydney, Australia
- Genres: Classical, jazz flute
- Instrument: Flute
- Years active: 1940–2012

Linda Caprice Vogt AM (28 September 1922 – 2 April 2013) was an Australian flautist.

Vogt was born in 1922 in Melbourne, and began to learn the flute under Melbourne Symphony Orchestra second flute, Leslie Barklamb, in 1938. She joined the MSO in 1940 as "extra flute"—an unusual appointment due to her lack of conservatorium training. In 1942, she joined the ABC Sydney Studio Orchestra, which would later become the Sydney Symphony Orchestra.

In 1952, she married Colin Evans, the SSO's third flute and piccolo, and subsequently left the orchestra to start a family, although she gained a reputation as a soloist with Musica Viva Australia and the Australian Broadcasting Corporation, and also crossed over from classical to jazz flute, joining Charlie Munro's jazz quintet and acquiring the nickname "Hot Lips".

In the 1970s and 1980s, Vogt taught music, and was involved in the establishment of several flute organisations, including the Sydney Flute Society (1973), as executive director of the Australian Flute Conventions in 1973 and 1983, and as a member of the steering committee for the foundation of the Australian Flute Association (1981). She also instigated the creation of the Register of Historic Flutes with Robert Brown. In 1976, she founded Zephyr Music, a sheet music supply company which became a successful family business.

Vogt was made a Member of the Order of Australia in the Australia Day honours in 1989, for service to music.
