= Abraham Abreu =

Venezuelan harpsichordist and pianist (born 1939)

Abraham Abreu (born 1939, Caracas) is a Venezuelan harpsichordist and pianist .

== Biography ==
He earned a Masters of Music from Yale University in harpsichord and piano performance before becoming an internationally celebrated concert performer.

He has made appearances throughout Europe and the Americas, including performances in England, Scotland, France, Italy, Germany, Austria, Switzerland, Norway, the Netherlands, the United States, Colombia, Argentina, Mexico, Guatemala, Chile and Brazil. He has been a faculty member at the Universidad Simón Bolívar, the Universidad Central de Venezuela and the Escuela Experimental de Música Manuel Alberto López. He has recorded several solo albums and has made numerous appearances on radio and television.

His son is recorder player Aldo Abreu.

== Sources ==
- Biography of Abraham Abreu at bach-cantatas.com
