= Peter Bucknell =

Filmmaker and violist

Peter Wentworth Bucknell (born 1967) is a filmmaker, author and classical violist residing in Barcelona.

== Film ==
Peter Bucknell is a commercial and documentary filmmaker who has worked also as an underwater camera operator on projects including the short film *Gasp!* (2011) and the television series *Bizarre Foods with Andrew Zimmern* (2016, Season 8, "The Bronx"). In 2014, he wrote *The Underwater GoPro Book*, a manual on the use of GoPro cameras for underwater filming. He also produced, filmed and edited the documentary *Mist of the Perfume River* (2019), which follows comedian Hung Le revisiting Vietnam for the tenth anniversary of his father’s death. Bucknell has filmed in locations such as New York's shipwrecks and Mexico's caves.

== Performing arts ==
Author of Violin is Easy, a pedagogical book for teachers and students, Bucknell began in the performing arts as a classical musician. He performed the Australian premiere, broadcast live by the Australian Broadcasting Corporation, of Chaconne for Viola and Orchestra by Michael Colgrass. He performed and recorded as solo violist with Apollo's Fire, the Los Angeles Baroque Orchestra, Les Concerts du Monde, and Los Angeles Musica Viva. He was guest principal viola in the Barcelona Symphony Orchestra and National Orchestra of Catalonia. He was the principal violist with the Rebel Baroque Orchestra from 1998 - 2009. He appeared as a guest on Jim Henson's The Ghost of Faffner Hall as a member of the Como String Quartet in 1988.

As a member of the Danel Quartet, specialising in the string quartets of Dmitri Shostakovich, Bucknell has appeared at Wigmore Hall and in many other European halls, and on Radio France. As a member of the Stradivari Sextet, Bucknell was loaned the "Mahler Stradivarius."

He was a founding member of the Raw Fish Quartet performing at the George Crumb Festival in New York, concerts in Taiwan and La Jolla and at the Santa Fe Chamber Music Festival, playing George Crumb's Black Angels and Steve Reich's Different Trains. He was a member of the Munich Chamber Orchestra, he recorded with Concerto Köln, and performed with Musica Antiqua Köln.

== Background ==
A documentary film maker, Bucknell is known for his factual short films and environmental films shot underwater and a documentary film shot in Vietnam about artist Le Thanh Nhon.

A classical viola player, Bucknell was for several years the Professor of viola at the Crane School of Music, State University of New York at Potsdam.

Bucknell's early studies on violin were with Russian pedagogue Nelli Shkolnikova. In 1991 he won the Auckland International Viola Congress Competition and the Queen Elizabeth II Silver Jubilee Award. His Quartet won the Interpretation Prize in the Osaka International Chamber Music Competition.

He studied music in Melbourne at the Victorian College of the Arts with Nathan Gutman; in Los Angeles, California with violist Donald McInness; in Siena, Italy at the Accademia Musicale Chigiana with Yuri Bashmet; and in Cologne, Germany with Rainer Moog, a student of Walter Trampler at the Juilliard School, the principal violist of the Berlin Philharmonic Orchestra under Herbert von Karajan.

Bucknell holds a Bachelor of Economics and Commerce degree from the University of Melbourne and a Doctor of Music degree from the State University of New York at Stony Brook where he studied with professor Mitchell Stern.

Bucknell is the son of Tasmanian-born painter Toni Bucknell of Melbourne, Australia. He is married to mezzo-soprano Rinat Shaham.

== Discography ==
Recordings include two chamber music CDs on the classical music label, Musica Omnia, with the Atlantis Trio and the Atlantis Ensemble:

- Felix Mendelssohn's Piano trio No. 1, Op.49 and Piano sextet, Op. 110
- Robert Schumann's Piano Quintet Op. 44, Franz Schubert's Trout Quintet and song "Die Forelle." (Eighth release in "The Romantics" series.)

== See also ==
- Early music
- Baroque music
- Historically informed performance
