= Fuoco E Cenere =

French early music ensemble

Fuoco E Cenere (Italian for 'Fire and Ash') is an early music ensemble based in Paris and directed by Jay Bernfeld.

== Biography ==
The ensemble was founded in 2002 by Jay Bernfeld, viola da gamba, and Patricia Lavail, recorder. Its name refers to the rebirth of the Phoenix and illustrates the ensemble’s desire to revive forgotten scores, often in original juxtapositions.

Fuoco E Cenere is singled out by its repertoire ranging from the Middle Ages to the beginning of the 20th century. More than a thousand years of music that have been recorded on 10 discs. The ensemble appears in various forms, both instrumental and vocal, ranging from 2 to 10 artists.

The adventure began in 2002 with "Fantasy in Blue", a program featuring works by Purcell and Gershwin, with mezzo-soprano Rinat Shaham. The CD was hailed by Le Monde as "a real knockout". Petrarch’s 700th birthday (2004) was marked by a tribute program with Guillemette Laurens. In 2006, Canta Napoli was a journey through 400 years of Neapolitan songs and its great singers.

In 2007, Fuoco E Cenere’s interpretation of Marco da Gagliano’s La Dafne was awarded an Orphée d'Or by the Académie du Disque Lyrique.

The ensemble first theatrical endeavor Je Suis Ton Labyrinthe was staged by David Lippe in 2008, during a residence at the International Institute of Puppetry of Charleville-Mézières. A mix of live music and object theater, the production starred Isabelle Poulenard and Guillemette Laurens and was recorded on the Arion label as Umana e Inumana. Pulcinella was created in 2009 in collaboration with the Neapolitan puppeteer master Bruno Leone, and allowed the music of Pergolese to meet the art of burattinaio. This program was presented at the International Museum of Puppetry in Sicily and at the Cité de la Musique in Paris.

Complètement Toqué was created in 2013 during a residence at the Théâtre de Saint-Quentin-en-Yvelines and has been performed more than 35 times in Europe and North America. This musico-culinary fantasy staged by Véronique Samakh was conceived as a nod to the recognition of the culinary and gastronomic know-how of France, raised to the rank of World Heritage by Unesco. The CD Judith & Esther, divine destinies (2014) highlights the universal stories of two biblical heroines. The concert performances benefit from the on stage participation of illustrator Fred Bayle.

In 2015, Fuoco E Cenere began a collaboration with Canal + for its original creation, the TV series Versailles, featuring the ensemble’s musicians both on screen and on the soundtrack for the three seasons. This collaboration inspired a program of the same name, reflecting the omnipresence of music at the Court of Louis XIV.

In 2017, Jay Bernfeld paid tribute to a comrade of four decades with a CD covering 25 years in the life of Marin Marais.

Fuoco E Cenere performs both in France and internationally with appearances under the auspices of Early Music Vancouver, Froville Festival, Montreal Baroque Festival, Music at St Paul's in Delray, Festival Via Stellae, La Dame des Aulnes, Music and Beyond in Ottawa, Montansier Theater in Versailles, Riches Musicales de la Rotonde, Musik + in Austria, Festival Midis Minimes in Belgium, St Michel en Thiérache Festival, Reims Opera, Folles Journées de Nantes... and others.

Several of the premieres of its shows were given at the Tropical Baroque Music Festival of the Miami Bach Society.

== Discography ==
- Fantasy in Blue, Purcell & Gershwin – ATMA Classique (2001)
- Suites, Sonatas & Concerto for Viola da Gamba, Boismortier – OGAM (2002)
- Salmi di Davide, Benedetto Marcello – ATMA Classique (2004)
- Gentil Mia Donna, Petrarca e la musica – Arion (2004)
- Pièces de violes, Louis de Caix d’Hervelois – Arion (2005)
- Canta Napoli – Arion (2006)
- La Dafne, Marco da Gagliano – Arion (2008)
- Umana E Inumana, Alessandro Scarlatti et Francesco Durante – Arion (2010)
- Judith & Esther – Cordes & Âmes (2014)
- Folies d'Espagne & Pièces de viole, Marin Marais - Paraty (2017)
