= Rinat Shaham =

Operatic mezzo-soprano

- Born: Haifa, Israel
- Genres: Opera
- Occupation: Operatic mezzo-soprano
- Instrument: Vocals
- Labels: Pentatone (record label); ATMA Classique
- Spouse: Peter Bucknell
- Education: Curtis Institute of Music
- Awards: ARPA Award; Opernwelt's Singer of the Year

Rinat Shaham is a mezzo-soprano who has received numerous accolades for her international operatic, concert and recital performances.

== Life and career ==
Shaham was born into a musical family. She developed an interest in theatre after attending an arts school. Shaham completed her Bachelor of Music and Master of Music degrees at the Curtis Institute of Music in Philadelphia, Pennsylvania in the United States.

Rinat Shaham has sung leading roles with the New York City Opera, the Berlin State Opera, the Vienna State Opera, the Aix-en-Provence Festival, the Glyndebourne Festival, the Théâtre des Champs-Élysées, Opera Australia, The Royal Opera House and many more.

Shaham has performed as soloist with symphony orchestras including the Berlin Philharmonic, the Chicago Symphony, the New York Philharmonic, the London Philharmonic, the San Francisco Symphony, the Los Angeles Philharmonic, the Philadelphia Orchestra, the Israel Philharmonic Orchestra, the Boston Symphony and the Minnesota Orchestra among others. She has performed with some of the most eminent conductors of today, including Seiji Ozawa, Simon Rattle, André Previn, Christoph Eschenbach, Leonard Slatkin, Daniel Barenboim, Simone Young, Antonio Pappano, William Christie, David Robertson, Dan Ettinger, Christian Thielemann, and Eiji Oue.

Rinat Shaham's many roles include the title role in Bizet's Carmen, a role for which she is most famous and has sung internationally hundreds of performances, Charlotte in Massenet's Werther, Dorabella in Mozart's Così fan tutte, Mélisande in Debussy's Pelléas et Mélisande, Cherubino in Mozart's The Marriage of Figaro, Zerlina and Donna Elvira in Mozart's Don Giovanni, Rosina in Rossini's The Barber of Seville, Blanche in Poulenc's Dialogues of the Carmelites, Cendrillon (by Massenet), Ottavia in the coronation of Poppea, and Judit (Bluebeard's castle).

Shaham is an alumna of the Music Academy of the West where she attended the summer conservatory program in 1995, 1996 and 1997.

Shaham regularly appears in recitals and concerts, among her operatic assignments.

She is married to Australian-born violist and filmmaker Peter Bucknell. Her brother is violinist Hagai Shaham.

== Recording and other media ==
Opera DVDs with Rinat Shaham have been produced for Carmen, The Barber of Seville and The Marriage of Figaro.

She sings the role of Judith in the 2025 recording of Béla Bartók’s opera Bluebeard’s Castle, conducted by Karina Canellakis with the Netherlands Radio Philharmonic Orchestra. The recording was awarded “Opera Choice” by BBC Music Magazine.

She has recorded excerpts from operas by Jean-Baptiste Lully for Erato and Deutsche Grammophon with William Christie, and Maurice Ravel's L'enfant et les sortilèges with André Previn.

Shaham's solo CD of songs by George Gershwin and Henry Purcell, Fantasy in Blue with Fuoco E Cenere ("Fire and Ashes"), was published by ATMA Classique, as well as a CD of the same group performing Psalms of David by Benedetto Marcello.

Shaham made her feature film debut as "The Jazz Singer" in the 2001 István Szabó film, Taking Sides, with Harvey Keitel.
