= Vicki Boeckman =

- Born: September 1, 1955 (age 70); Los Angeles, California
- Genres: Early music, Baroque music
- Instrument: Recorder
- Website: www.VickiBoeckman.com

Vicki Boeckman (born 1955) is an American recorder artist, performer, and educator.

== Life and career ==
Originally from Los Angeles, California, Vicki was introduced to the recorder while studying flute at California State University, Northridge. In 1981, she moved to Denmark to continue her studies with Eva Legêne, Marion Verbruggen and Walter van Hauwe. She taught at the Royal Danish Academy of Music, returning to the United States for performance and workshops beginning 1991. In 2004 she relocated to Seattle, Washington where she continues to teach and perform. She has served as music director of the Portland Recorder Society and is the music director of the Seattle Recorder Society.

== Ensembles ==
Vicki has performed with the following groups:

- Los Angeles Baroque Orchestra
- The Medieval Women’s Choir.
- Philharmonia Northwest Orchestra
- Portland Baroque Orchestra Principal Recorder.
- Royal Danish Academy of Music
- Seattle Baroque Orchestra

She is a founding member of the following groups:

- Ensemble Electra
- Opus 4
- Wood’N’Flutes Recorder trio with Pia Brinch Jensen, and Gertie Johnsson

== Discography ==
- (1988) The Six Recorder Sonatas Georg Philipp Telemann with Finn Hansen and Lars Ulrik Mortensen. Kontrapunkt.
- (1990) Early Italian Baroque with Finn Hansen and Lars Ulrik Mortensen. Kontrapunkt.
- (199x) Flute Music from the Baroque with Opus 4. Primavera Music.
- (2000) Telemann: Trio Sonatas with Recorder with John Holloway, Jaap ter Linden, and Lars Ulrik Mortensen. Classico.
- (2001) Journey with Wood’N’Flutes. Scoop Entertainment Group.
- (2004) A DUO Recorder duets with Dorte Lester Nauta. Classico.
- (2007) Woodworks with Wood’N’Flutes. DaCapo.
- (2010) Francesco Barsanti Recorder Sonatas with Ensemble Electra.
- (2011) Musicke for a King with Wood’N’Flutes.
