= Elena Durán =

American flautist

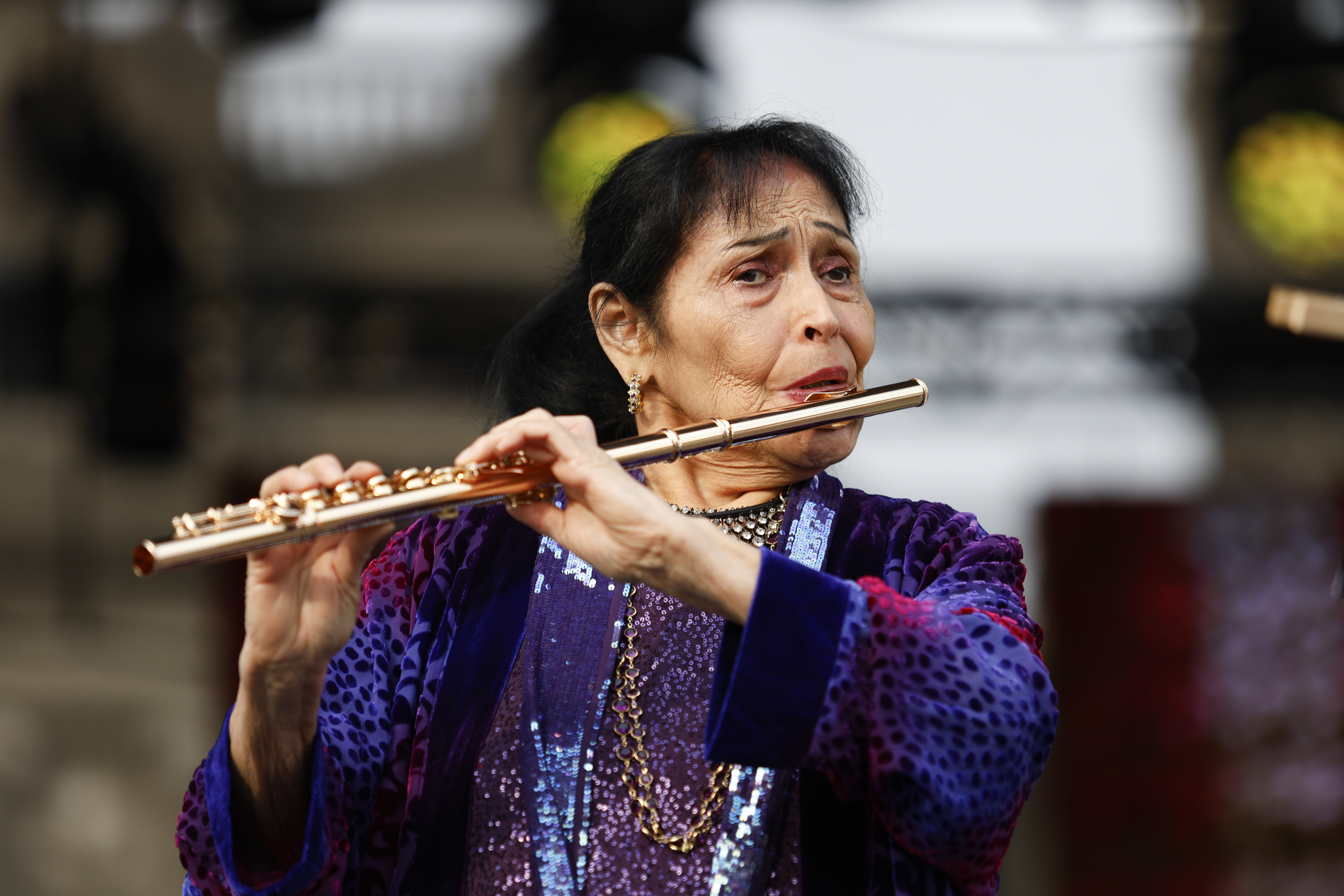
Durán in 2024

Elena Duran (born February 21, 1949, East Oakland, California) is an American flautist.

Duran's parents were from Aguascalientes, Mexico. She has made concerto appearances and recordings with many major orchestras including the Royal Philharmonic Orchestra, the English Chamber Orchestra, Bournemouth Sinfonietta, the Moscow Virtuosi, many orchestras in the U.S. and virtually every orchestra in Mexico. She has also played regularly for members of the British royal family including two televised Royal Galas from the Royal Albert Hall in London. She has twice had the honour of appearing before Queen Elizabeth II.

Since the 1990s Duran has been artistic director of the International Flute Festival in Stratford-upon-Avon, the largest annual flute festival in Europe.
