= Rachel Begley =

American musician

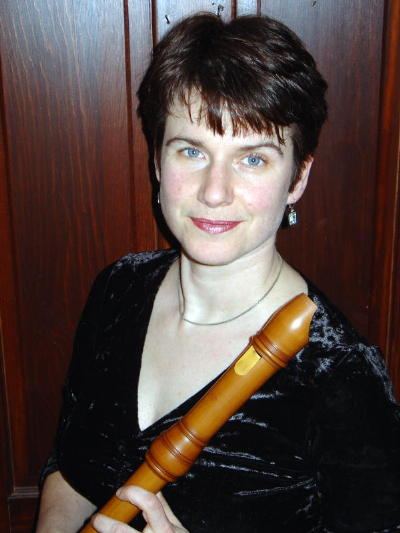
Rachel J. Begley

Rachel J. Begley is a professional recorder and baroque bassoon virtuoso from England, now based in Long Island, New York, United States. She has performed and interacted with many of the leading recorder players of this generation, including the Flanders Recorder Quartet. She is a founding member of the New Amsterdam Recorder Trio (NewART) and Sympatica. She has performed as a soloist at the Boston Early Music Festival and the Berkeley Early Music Festival.
