= Derek Simpson (cellist) =

British cellist (1928–2007)

Derek Simpson (29 March 1928 – 22 June 2007) was an English cellist, known primarily from his work with the Aeolian Quartet, and as the teacher of many contemporary cellists.

== Career ==
Simpson was born in Worksop, Nottinghamshire, to musician parents, and started playing the cello at 10 years old. At 19 he moved to London to study at the Royal Academy of Music. In 1952 he won the Suggia Prize, which gave him the chance to study in Paris for a year, with the famous cellist Pierre Fournier. On his return to England, Simpson soon got work both for the Brighton Philharmonic, the London Chamber Orchestra, and as a solo performer.

In 1956 he received an offer to join the very prestigious Aeolian String Quartet. He remained with the quartet until it disbanded in 1981. The ensemble, among other things, made a complete recording of Haydn's string quartets – a project that took six years to complete. Simpson also had time for other projects, however, and his playing can be heard on the Beatles' singles "Strawberry Fields Forever".

He taught at the Royal Academy of Music, where several of his many pupils took part in memorial tribute concerts in January and February 2008 (see External links). He was among the teachers of Raphael Wallfisch. Among his active pupils are: Angela East, Benedict Rogerson, Mary Pells, Justin Pearson, Hafliði Hallgrímsson, Robert Ibell, Susan Sheppard, Sebastian Comberti and Alasdair Strange. Many of his students share an interest in historically informed performance.

Simpson was married three times; his last wife was his colleague in the Aeolian Quartet, Margaret Major. His first wife, Fiona Cameron, was the daughter of his teacher Douglas Cameron, and a concert pianist with whom he would occasionally perform. With Fiona he had two children. He also had a third son who died in a car accident in 1972.

== Selected recordings ==
- Monteverdi, Il ballo dell'ingrate (London Chamber Players/Ambrosian Singers cond. Alfred Deller, with various instrumentalists) (Vanguard CD)
- Purcell Instrumental works (Yehudi Menuhin/Roy Jesson/Ambrose Gauntlett/Cecil Aronowitz/Derek Simpson/Albert Lysy/Robert Masters/Walter Gerhard.)
- Handel Concerti Grossi, Water music, Firework music (Ambrose Gauntlett/Colin Tilney/Derek Simpson/George Malcolm)
- J.S. Bach, Trio Sonata from The Musical Offering, BWV 1079 (Yehudi Menuhin/Elaine Schaffer/Derek Simpson/Ronald Kinloch Anderson) (EMI 5744392 (2 CDs))
- Brahms String sextets nos 1 & 2 (Yehudi Menuhin/Robert Masters/Cecil Aronowitz/Derek Simpson/Ernst Wallfisch/Maurice Gendron) (Encore CD B00005RHIA)
- John Ireland, G minor sonata for cello & piano (Derek Simpson/Leonard Cassini) (Revolution RCB 5)
- Michael Tippett, Fantasia Concertante on a theme of Corelli (Derek Simpson/Robert Masters/Yehudi Menuhin, Bath Festival Orchestra cond. Tippett, rec. 1964) (EMI Classics CD 63522)
- Lennox Berkeley, Alan Rawsthorne and Alan Bush, Chamber music (Music Group of London/Margaret Major/Derek Simpson/Thea King)
- Nikos Skalkottas, Variations on a Greek folk tune for piano trio (Robert Masters/Derek Simpson/Marcel Gazelle) (HMV ASD 2289 (Argo ZRG 753))

and recordings with the Aeolian Quartet.

- The Beatles, Strawberry Fields Forever
