= Red Priest =

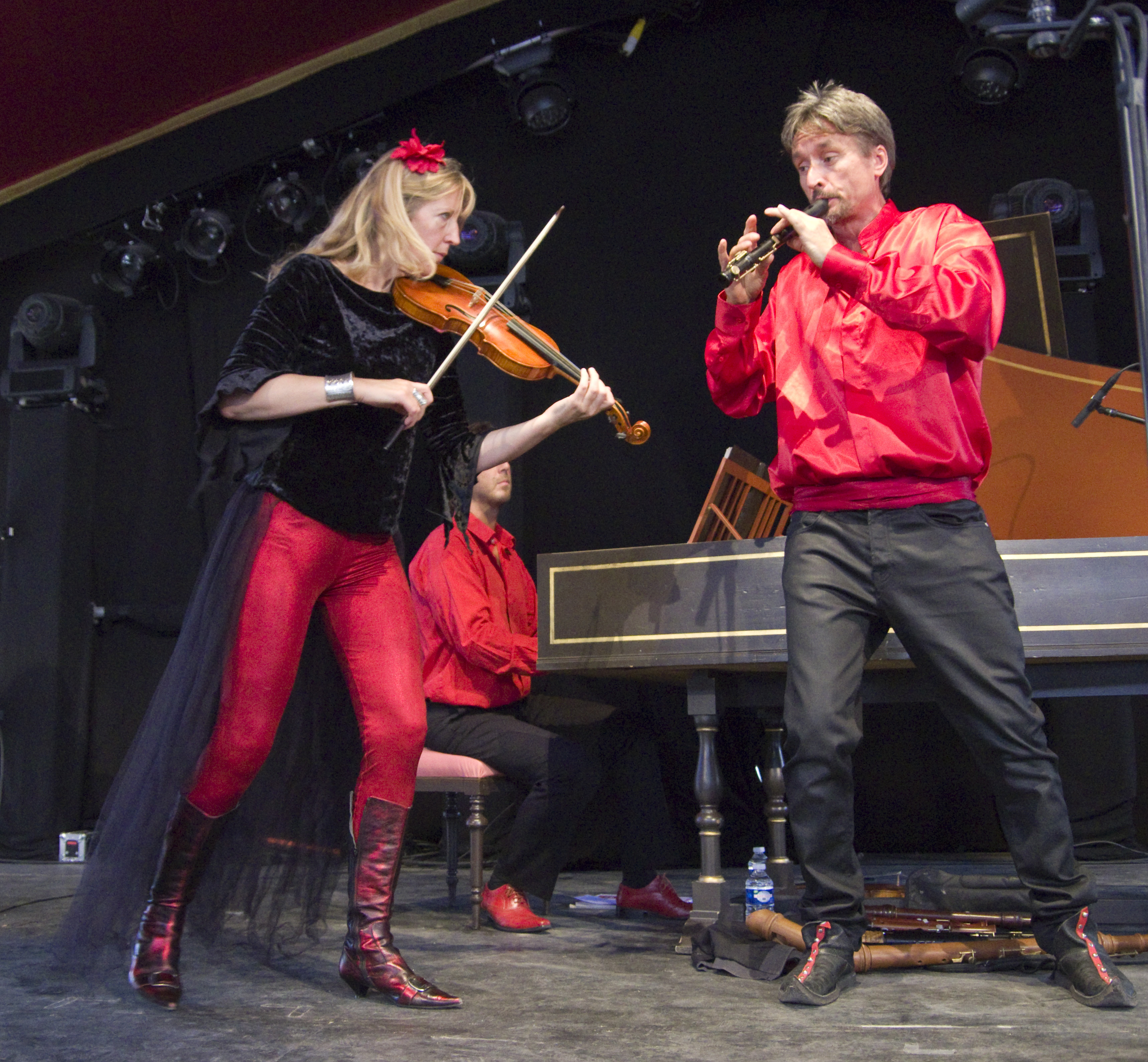
- Red Priest performing in 2015

Background information
- Years active: 1997–present
- Website: redpriest.bandzoogle.com

Red Priest is a British Baroque instrumental group that was formed in 1997 by Piers Adams. Currently it is composed of four performers: Adams on recorder, Julia Bishop on violin, Angela East on cello and David Wright on harpsichord. The group is named after the red-haired Italian priest and Baroque composer, Antonio Vivaldi.

The quartet plays in a flamboyant, theatrical and virtuosic style making use of props, costumes, dramatic lighting and other effects. The pieces they perform are generally their own arrangements, though based very closely on the original music by Vivaldi, Bach, et al.

In addition to touring all over the world, Red Priest are a frequent guest on BBC Radio 3's In Tune programme. They have released several albums, including a contemporary take on Vivaldi's The Four Seasons.

== Discography ==
- Priest On The Run – 1998
- Nightmare In Venice – 2002
- The 4 Seasons – 2003
- Pirates Of The Baroque – 2008
- Johann, I'm Only Dancing – 2009
- Handel In The Wind – 2014
- The Baroque Bohemians – 2017

== Lineup history ==
1997–2001	2001–2011	2011–2015
Piers Adams – recorder; Julia Bishop – violin; Angela East – cello; Julian Rhodes – harpsichord	Peirs Adams – recorder; Julia Bishop – violin; Angela East – cello; Howard Beach – harpsichord	Piers Adams – recorder; Julia Bishop – violin; Angela East – cello; David Wright – harpsichord
2015–2023	2023–present
Piers Adams – recorder; Adam Summerhayes – violin; Angela East – cello; David Wright – harpsichord	Piers Adams – recorder; Julia Bishop – violin; Angela East – cello; David Wright – harpsichord
