= Jazz flute =

Use of the flute in jazz music

Jazz flute is the use of the flute in jazz music. While flutes were sometimes played in ragtime and early jazz ensembles, the flute became established as a jazz instrument in the 1950s. It is now widely used in ensembles and by soloists. The modern Boehm system transverse concert flute is commonly used in jazz playing; other members of the same family are used, such as the alto flute in G. Ethnic and other flutes, such as bamboo flutes, have also been used in jazz.

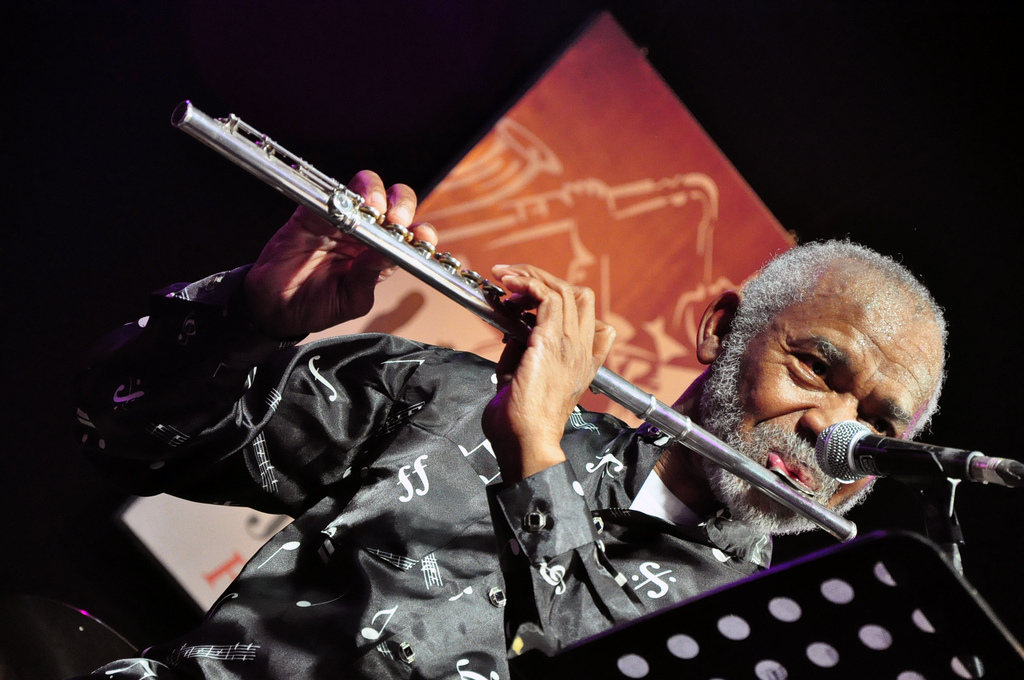
Hubert Laws at the Jakarta International Java Jazz Festival in 2010

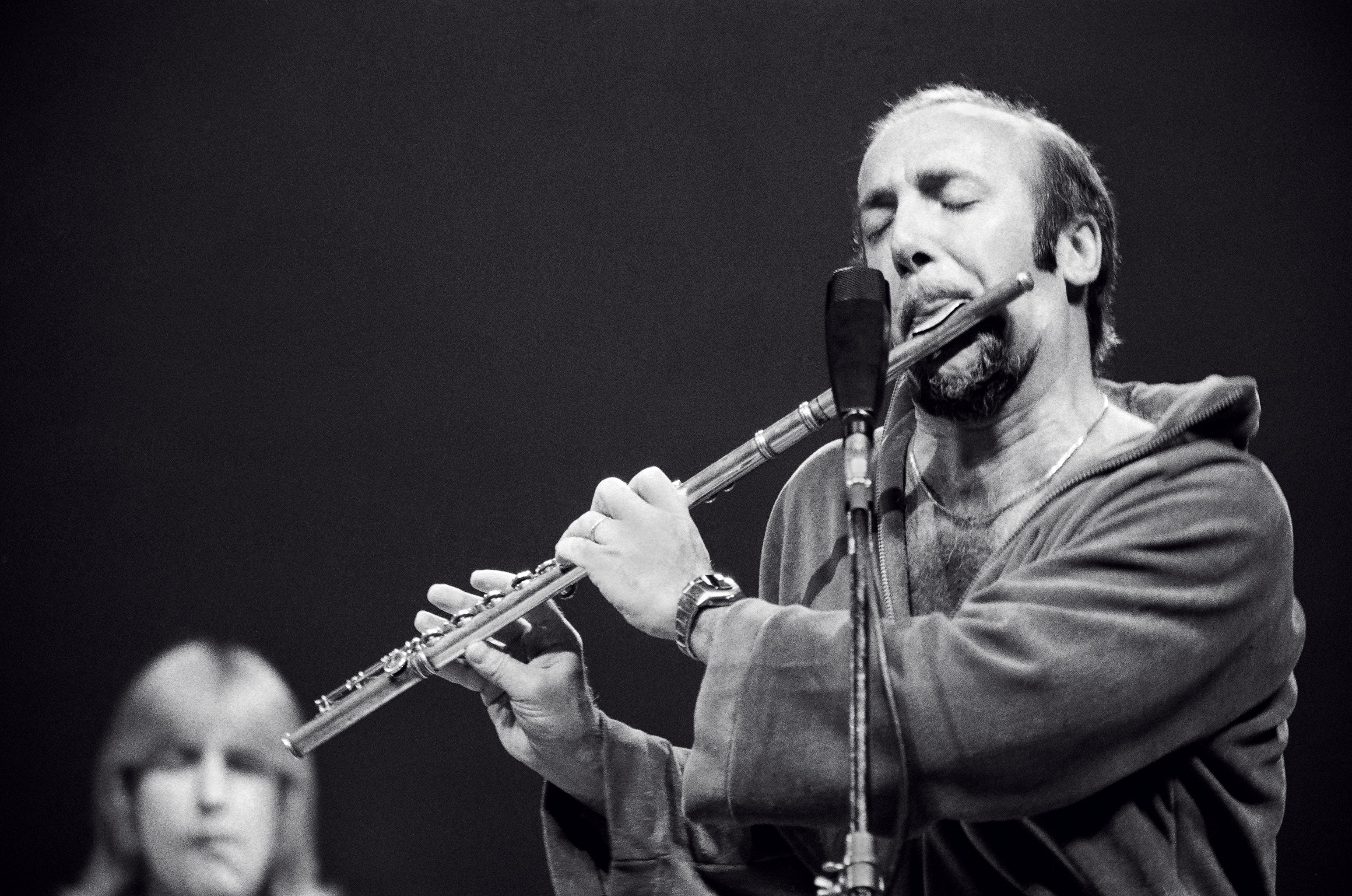
Herbie Mann at the Eastman Theatre, Rochester, NY, in 1975

== History ==
The flute was not widely used in early jazz, although some ragtime arrangements call for it. The timbre and the limited dynamic range of the instrument and its associations with classical music caused it to be perceived as unsuitable to big band ensembles and unable to swing convincingly. Before the use of amplification became common practice in the 1930s, jazz flute players were restricted to the upper range of the instrument to be audible.

Among the earliest jazz flute recordings is "Shootin' the Pistol," performed by the Cuban clarinettist and bandleader Alberto Socarras with the Clarence Williams band in 1927. The first jazzman to make extensive use of the flute was Wayman Carver, a saxophone player who from 1932 specialised in flute. He recorded flute solos with Benny Carter and with Spike Hughes in 1933, and played and recorded with the Chick Webb band for several years, soloing on flute on tracks such as "Sweet Sue", "Down Home Rag" and "I Got Rhythm".

Flute became more common in jazz during the 1950s. Sam Most, Herbie Mann, Eric Dolphy and Bobby Jasper were early important jazz flutists, with Hubert Laws and Roland Kirk achieving prominence in the '60s.

== Instruments ==
Flutes of many kinds have been used in jazz music.

=== Transverse flute ===
The modern Boehm system transverse concert flute is commonly used in jazz playing; other members of the same family are also heard. The piccolo is not common in jazz, but has been used by players such as Anthony Braxton and Hubert Laws, and by Marshall Allen, who recorded piccolo solos with Sun Ra. The alto flute in G is more often heard, and has been used in recordings by Bobby Jaspar, Túpac Amarulloa, Herbie Mann, Bud Shank and Paul Horn among others. Jimmy Giuffre soloed on bass flute in C on his album River Chant, recorded in 1975.

=== Recorder ===
The recorder is often perceived as unsuitable for jazz as its technique does not facilitate chromatic playing. Jazz recorder performers include Benoit Sauvé and Pete Rose, who also composes "written-out" jazz for performance by soloists or by groups such as the Amsterdam Loeki Stardust Quartet.

=== Other flutes ===
A wide variety of ethnic and other flutes have been used in jazz at times. Roland Kirk played bamboo flutes and nose flute, and Yusef Lateef used wooden and bamboo instruments. Theodosii Spassov plays jazz kaval. Shakuhachi was used in Tony Scott's Music for Zen Meditation in 1964. A single track on Live at the Blue Note by Dave Valentin lists instruments including concert flute, bamboo flutes, pan pipes, Peruvian bamboo bass flute, porcelain flute, Romanian pan flute and assorted whistles.

== Performers ==
Significant jazz flute players include Roland Kirk, Nicole Mitchell, Ron Burgundy, Bobby Jaspar, Eric Dolphy, Jamie Baum, Hubert Laws, Jerome Richardson, James Newton, Bobbi Humphrey, Herbie Mann, Dave Valentin, Bud Shank, Yusef Lateef, Buddy Collette, Jeremy Steig, Bennie Maupin, Sam Rivers, Moe Koffman and Bill McBirnie
