= Drora Bruck =

Israeli recorder player

Drora Bruck דרורה ברוק
- Born: December 31, 1966 (age 58); Haifa, Israel
- Genres: Medieval, renaissance, baroque
- Instrument: Recorder

Drora Bruck (Hebrew: דרורה ברוק; born December 31, 1966, in Haifa, Israel) is an Israeli recorder player.

== Biography ==
Drora Bruck graduated from the Jerusalem Academy of Music and Dance, where she studied with Michael Meltzer, for her BMus which was obtained in 1990. Bruck went on to study in the Civica Scuola di Musica in Milan with Pedro Memelsdorff after winning a scholarship from the Italian Ministry of Foreign Affairs.

She teaches at the Faculty of the Performing Arts in the Jerusalem Academy of Music and Dance, and is the director of the Early Music department of the Shtriker Israeli Conservatory of Music in Tel Aviv established in September 2005. Since 2014, Bruck is a lecturer in the Department of Music, in the Givat Washington College, Israel.

Bruck has performed and recorded works written for her, from solo pieces to chamber music with voice, guitar, piano, string quartet and electronic sounds.

== See also ==
- Tamar Lalo
- Music in Israel
