= Gwyn Roberts =

American recorder and traverso soloist

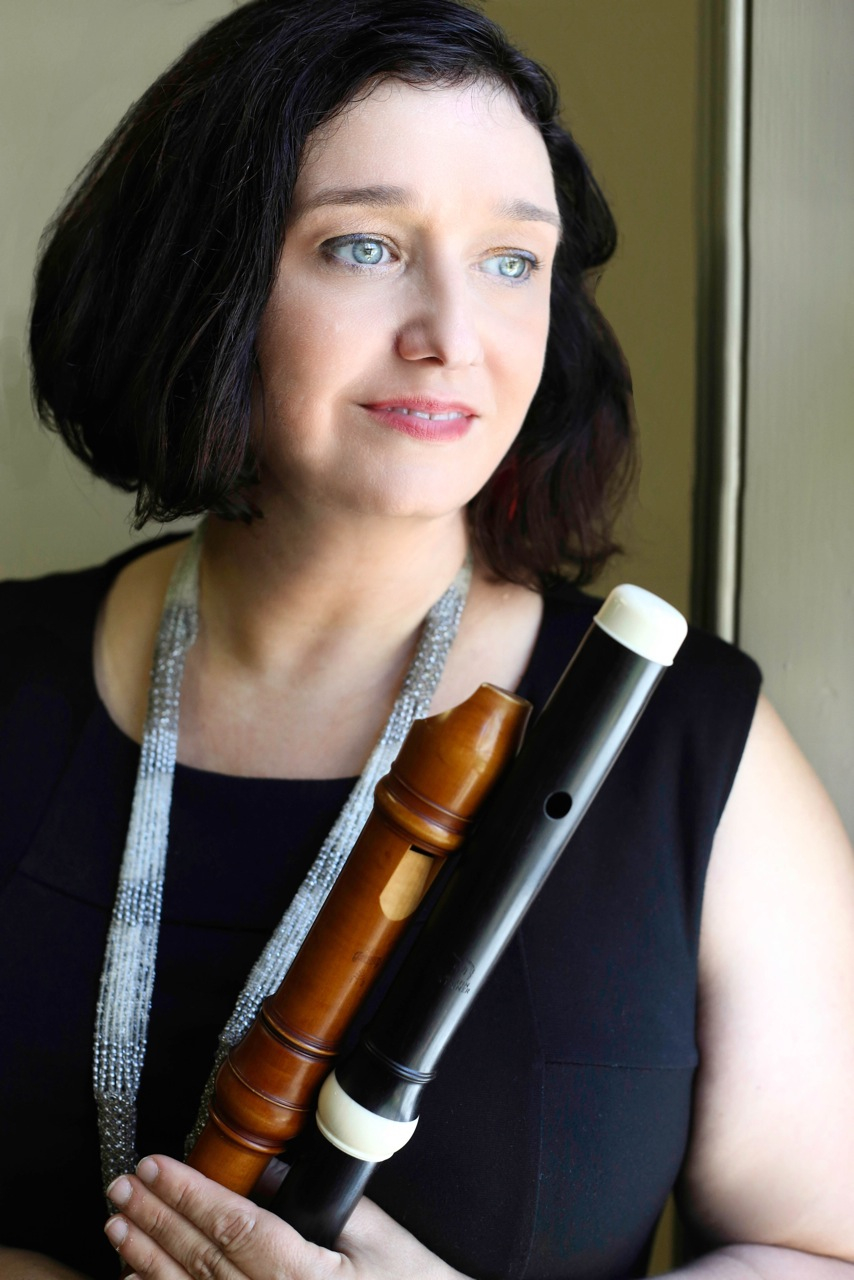
Gwyn Roberts

Gwyn Roberts, an American recorder and traverso soloist, and educator. She is a founding co-director of the Tempesta di Mare Philadelphia Baroque Orchestra with Richard Stone. Roberts also serves as the Director of Early Music at the University of Pennsylvania and is on faculty at the Peabody Conservatory of Johns Hopkins University.

== Education ==
Gwyn Roberts earned her AB from Bryn Mawr College and her performer's certificate from Utrecht Conservatory in the Netherlands, where she studied recorder with Leo Meilink and Marion Verbruggen and baroque flute with Marten Root.

== Career ==
Roberts has performed worldwide, with solo engagements including the Concerto Soloists Chamber Orchestra, Philomel Baroque Orchestra, Recitar Cantando (Tokyo), Prague Spring Festival (New York and Prague), Piffaro, Washington Bach Consort, and Philadelphia Classical Symphony. Her recordings include Chandos, Deutsche Grammaphon, PGM, Dorian, Sony, Vox, Polygram, Newport, Radio France. In addition to her other faculty positions, Roberts is also a popular workshop leader across the U.S. with such organizations as the Amherst Early Music Festival.

== Recordings ==
| Title | Release details |
|---|---|
| Veracini: The Recorder Sonatas, vol. 1 | November 1996, PGM |
| Weiss: Lute Concerti | May 2004, CHAN 0707 |
| Handel: Flaming Rose | July 2007, CHAN 0743 |
| Scarlatti: Cantatas and Chamber Music | April 2010, CHAN 0768 |
| Fasch: Orchestral Music, vol.1 | April 2008, CHAN 0751 |
| Fasch: Orchestral Music, vol.2 | October 2011, CHAN 0783 |
| Fasch: Orchestral Music, vol.3 | September 2012, CHAN 0791 |
| Mancini: Solos for a Flute | March 2014, CHAN 801 |
| Bach: Six Trio Sonatas | May 2014, CHAN 0803 |
| Comédie et Tragédie, vol. 1 | January 2015, CHAN 805 |
| Comédie et Tragédie, vol. 2 | TBA 2016, CHAN |

== Reception ==
Roberts has been called a “a world-class virtuoso” by American Record Guide.

The Washington Post remarked, “with her sparkling technique and sensitive attention to musicality, she infused the music with operatic drama.”

Her recording of Veracini Recorder Sonatas earned a five-star rating from BBC Music Magazine.

Michael Caruso has commented on "her sweet recorder playing," calling it "elegant and energetic, intimate and expansive."
