= Ricardo Kanji =

Brazilian musician, conductor and luthier (1948–2025)

- Kanji, c. 2008
- Born: 1 March 1948; São Paulo, Brazil
- Died: 24 February 2025 (aged 76); São Paulo, Brazil
- Education: Peabody Institute of Music; Royal Conservatory of The Hague
- Occupations: Recorder player; Flutist; Conductor; Luthier
- Organizations: Royal Conservatory of The Hague

Ricardo Kanji (1 March 1948 – 24 February 2025) was a Brazilian recorder player, flutist, conductor and luthier. For 12 years, he was a professor at the Royal Conservatory of The Hague. He was a founding member of the Orchestra of the Eighteenth Century. Back in Brazil, he promoted historically informed performance there as a teacher and as director of Vox Brasiliensis choir and orchestra. He was artistic director of a project History of Brazilian Music, to explore the music of colonial Brazil.

== Life and career ==
Kanji was born in São Paulo on 1 March 1948. He began piano lessons with Tatiana Braunwieser at age seven, and three years later studied with Lavinia Viotti who introduced him to the recorder. At age fifteen he began studying flute with João Dias Carrasqueira and two years later joined the Philharmonic Orchestra São Paulo (now defunct) and the Municipal Symphony Orchestra of São Paulo. In 1966, after a period of study in the United States, he founded the group Musikantiga.

In 1969 Kanji began to study flute at the Peabody Institute of Music in Baltimore, but when he met Frans Brüggen, he moved to the Netherlands, to specialise on the interpretation of Baroque and Classical music, studying at the Royal Conservatory of The Hague with Brüggen and Frans Vester between 1970 and 1972. In 1970 he won the First International Recorder Competition in Bruges. He was a founding member of both the conservatory's orchestra and in 1980 the Orchestra of the Eighteenth Century. He was a professor at the Royal Conservatory from 1973 to 1995, succeeding Bruggen. He was also artistic director of the Concerto Amsterdam from 1991 to 1996. He participated in important ensembles playing period instruments in the Netherlands and created the Ensemble Philidor.

Kanji returned to Brazil in 1995, continuing to work as a performer, conductor, teacher, and luthier. In 1997, he founded and directed the ensemble Vox Brasiliensis, recording Brazilian and European music. He promoted historically informed performance in Brazil, teaching it at Curitiba Music Workshop and teaching recorder at the São Paulo State Music School. His students included Clea Galhano, and Hanneke van Proosdij.

Kanji was artistic director of the project History of Brazilian Music, which produced a series of television programs and CDs on the rich and little-known music of colonial Brazil. For this work he received an award from the Art Critics Association of São Paulo in 1999.

Kanji spread the colonial music of Brazil and the Americas, serving as guest conductor in Brazil and Europe In November 2006 he conducted Donizetti's Don Pasquale in the Netherlands, Belgium and Poland, with stage direction by Walter Neiva, a production of the Opera Krakowska. The CD "Neukomm in Brazil," directed by Kanji and Rosana Lanzelotte received the Premio Bravo award in 2009 as best conductor the year; it was also nominated for the Latin Grammy. He recorded with the cellist Antônio Meneses. In 2023 he played with the Orchestra of the Eighteenth Century for the last time, as recorder soloist in a piece that Louis Andriessen had written in memory of Bruggen. In 2024 Kanji conducted the Camerata Antiqua of Curitiba in a concert for their 50th anniversary at the Teatro Colón in Buenos Aires.

Kanji was diagnosed with a brain tumor in January 2025. He died in São Paulo on 24 February 2025, at the age of 76.
