= Christopher Cook (composer) =

American composer

Christopher Cook (born 1962 in Louisville, Kentucky) is an American composer of contemporary classical music.

Cook received the Doctor of Music degree from Indiana University where he served as assistant director of the Center for Electronic and Computer Music. He has received awards and honors from the Fromm Music Foundation at Harvard University, the National Endowment for the Arts, ASCAP, MTNA, and the National Assembly of Local Arts Agencies. He has been composer-in residence for Amherst College, the University of Evansville, Monroe County Community Schools Corporation (Indiana) and for the city of Somerset, Pennsylvania. He is Director of Music Theory and Composition at Christopher Newport University in Newport News, Virginia.

His compositions are widely performed in university and festival settings, including June in Buffalo, Music of Our Time, the Indiana State University Contemporary Music Festival, The Society of Composers Inc., the Annual American Music Week (Sofia, Bulgaria), and the Utrecht Music Festival (The Netherlands). His Electro-acoustic works have been presented at conferences and festivals including the International Computer Music Conference, Society for Electro-acoustic Music in the United States, Florida Electro-acoustic Music Festival, Electronic Music Midwest, and the InterMedia Manifold TechArt exhibit.
