= Johann Gottlieb Janitsch =

German Baroque composer

Johann Gottlieb Janitsch (19 June 1708 – c. 1763) was a German Baroque composer who wrote in the galant style, transitional between the Baroque and Classical periods.

== Life ==
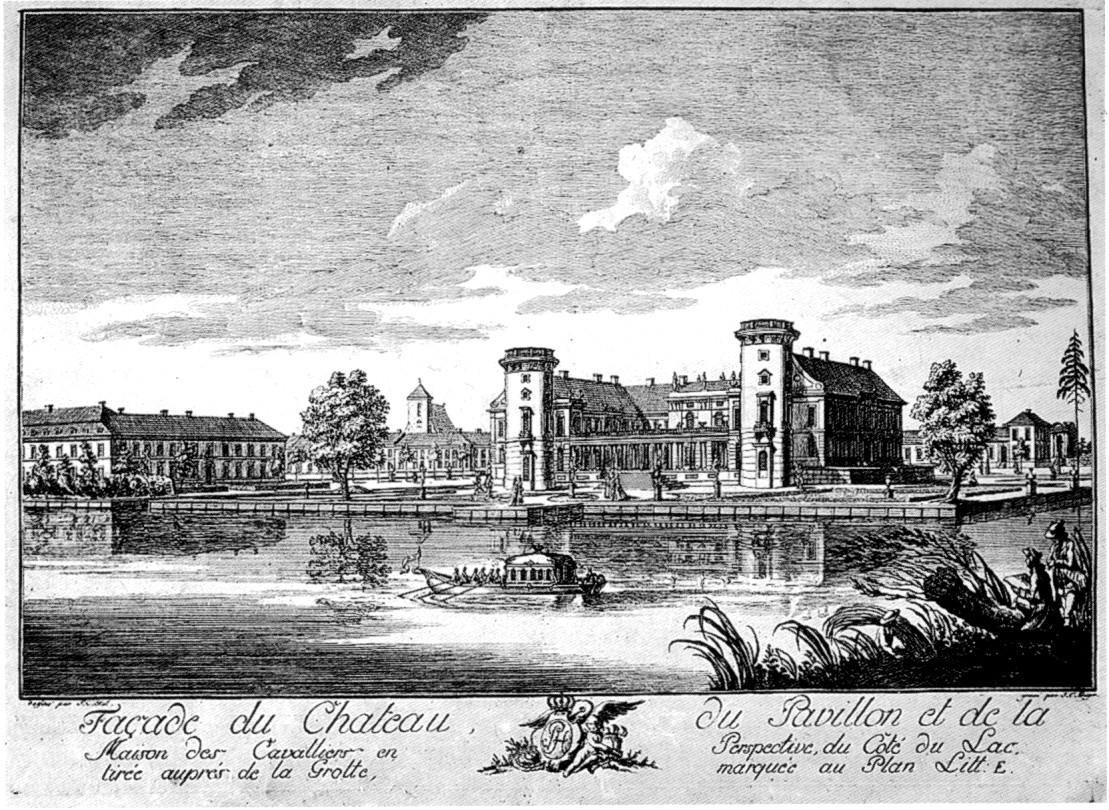
The Rheinsberg Palace where Janitsch performed

Janitsch was born in Schweidnitz, Silesia (today Świdnica, Poland). His father was a local merchant and later a Royal Tobacco importer for Schweidnitz and Jauer (today Jawor). His mother was the daughter of a well respected surgeon. He received his first musical education at the Latin school of the Holy Trinity in his hometown. His special inclination towards music led him to undertake a brief period of study in Breslau (today Wrocław) with the court musicians who were under the employment of the Archbishop of Breslau. In 1729 his father sent him to Frankfurt an der Oder, where he studied law at the Alma Mater Viadrina until 1733. During this time he received his first commissions to write large scale musical works for festive occasions.

In 1733 Janitsch moved to Berlin for three years as secretary to the Prussian state and war minister Franz Wilhelm von Happe. In 1736, the then Crown Prince, Frederick offered him a position as a "Contraviolinist" in his ensemble in Ruppin and a year later, in Rheinsberg, where Janitsch's home was destroyed in the great fire in 1740. During his time in Rheinsberg, with the permission of the Crown Prince, he founded the circle "Freitagsakademien" (Friday academies), in which music was performed by professional and amateur musicians alike.

From 1740, when Frederick ascended to the Prussian throne, Janitsch's position as Contraviolinist was transferred to the newly founded Berlin Court Orchestra, where he was awarded a salary of 350 thalers. The Friday academies continued in Berlin in his home in the form of weekly concerts open to the public. This musical association was the first in a long line of similar organisations which arose in Berlin after 1750. From 1743, Janitsch was required to compose and organise "Redutenmusik" for the annual court balls held at carnival time by Frederick. The music was performed by 24 oboists, specially selected from various regiments of the Prussian army.

In 1749 Janitsch married Johanna Henriette Eymler, the adoptive daughter of the civil servant and mayor Albrecht Emil Nicolai. Janitsch died in Berlin around 1763, although the exact date of his death is unknown. Some years after Janitsch's death, the composer Johann Wilhelm Hertel remarked He was a good contrapuntist and his Quartets are even now the best models of their kind.

Janitsch's compositional style is typical of the galant and the empfindsamer Stil of the first half of the 18th century. Although several of Janitsch's works were already published by Breitkopf during his lifetime, most of his surviving output exists in manuscript form. The largest repository of Janitsch's surviving works is the archive of the Sing-Akademie zu Berlin, which was thought to have been destroyed during World War II until it was rediscovered in the Kyiv Conservatory in 2000. There are also many other manuscripts in libraries across Europe.

== Works ==
=== Vocal ===
- Cantata "Che debbo rimirar" for soprano, strings and basso continuo
- Beati Omnes performed at the coronation of Adolf Frederick, King of Sweden, 1751
- Several Lieder for voice and keyboard
- Serenata, performed in Frankfurt an der Oder by the students of the University, 14. November 1729 when his Royal Majesty, Frederick William I of Prussia visited Mass. (Lost)
- Serenata, performed in Frankfurt an der Oder on 26. December 1731 when his Royal Majesty, Frederick William I of Prussia spent a few days there with the Crown Prince, Frederick II. (Lost)
- Serenata, performed in Frankfurt an der Oder in March 1732, when the reigning Holy Roman Emperor, the Count of Lothringen, travelled through Frankfurt. (Lost)
- Trauermusik for Professor Samuel Strimesius, 1730 (Lost)
- Trauermusik performed at the burial for State minister Knyphausen at the Komturei of Lietzen, 1731 (Lost)
- Abendmusik for Rector Professor Heinecius, ca.1731 (Lost)
- Wedding Cantata for the wedding of the Margrave of Bayreuth to Princess Wilhelmine of Prussia, 1731 (Lost)
- Te deum laudamus, for the laying of the foundation stone of St. Hedwig's Cathedral in Berlin, 1747 (Lost)

=== Instrumental ===
- Approximately 35 surviving Trio sonatas and approximately 40 Quadro sonatas in the form of Sonatas da chiesa and Sonatas da camera. Several other chamber works are lost.
- Around 30 Sinfonias for strings and continuo, some with horns and other wind instruments. Several are also attributed to other contemporaneous composers.
- 16 dances for the carnival ball of 1756.
- 2 harpsichord concerti. Other lost concerti include one for harpsichord and one for viola.
- Sonatas for Harpsichord and Organ.
