= Flanders Recorder Quartet =

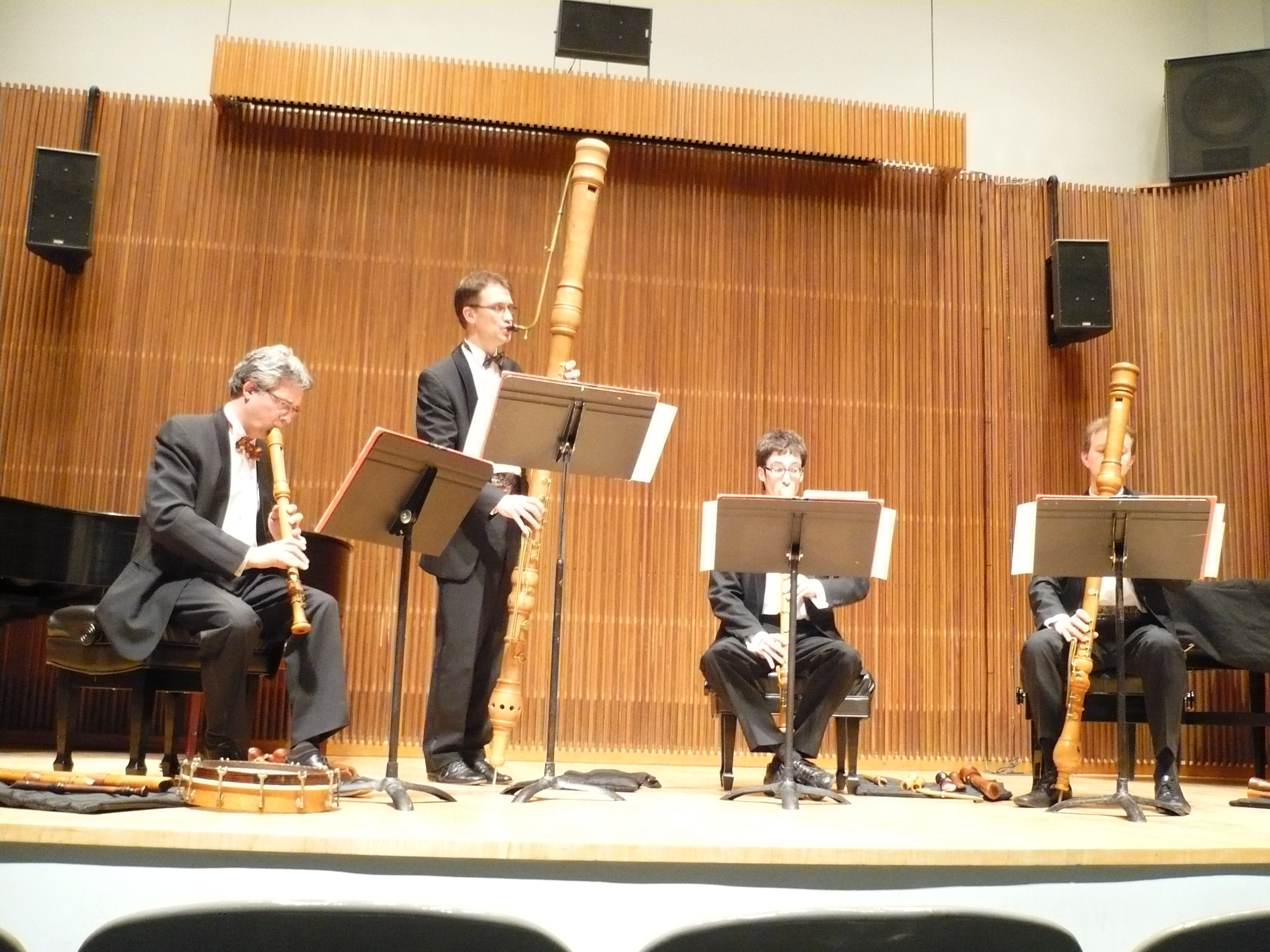
- The Flanders Recorder Quartet

Background information
- Origin: Belgium
- Years active: 1987–2018
- Members: Bart Spanhove, Tom Beets, Joris van Goethem, Paul van Loey
- Past members: Geert Van Gele, Fumiharu Yoshimine, Peter Van Heyghen, Han Tol
- Website: www.flanders-recorder-quartet.be

The Flanders Recorder Quartet was a professional recorder group based in Belgium.

== History ==
The group initially formed in 1987 and became more well known upon winning the 1990 competition Musica Antiqua Bruges, Belgium.

== Active members ==
- Bart Spanhove
- Tom Beets
- Joris van Goethem
- Paul van Loey

Previous Members: Geert Van Gele, Fumiharu Yoshimine, Peter Van Heyghen, Han Tol

== Reception ==
Reviews for the Flanders Recorder Quartet have been positive, with The New York Times praising the band's performance. The Columbia Spectator also positively reviewed the group, citing the flexibility of the recorders as a highlight. The Flanders Recorder Quartet has also received positive reviews from the Milwaukee Express and CultureMap Houston.

Of a 1998 performance of The Four Seasons, the Pittsburgh Post-Gazette wrote that the band was "brilliant" but that "for maintaining rhythmic vitality" the band "couldn't match good string playing".
