= Linda Turbett =

Linda Turbett is an English recorder player.

After graduating with a fellowship from Trinity College of Music in London, Turbett continued her studies with Peter Holtslag. She has performed throughout the United Kingdom and abroad with various ensembles and orchestras. As a soloist she has given numerous concerto performances, many under the direction of Peter Holman, at venues such as Finchcocks and the Purcell Room. She has performed at the Proms and has appeared on BBC Television and Classic FM radio. Turbett is a member of the Baroque Collective.
