= Quartet New Generation =

- Genres: recorder quartet
- Members: Andrea Guttmann, Petra Wurz (since 2010 instead of Hannah Pape), Heide Schwarz (since 2003), Susanne Fröhlich
- Website: www.quartetnewgeneration.com/

Quartet New Generation (QNG) was a group of four female recorder players. Andrea Guttmann, Petra Wurz (replacing Hannah Pape in 2010), Heide Schwarz (since 2003) and Susanne Fröhlich performed on recorder instruments of many different kinds and shapes and combined Early and Contemporary music.

The quartet was founded in September 1998 at the Amsterdam Conservatoire with a main interest in contemporary music. Since then they worked together with composers. Many new works were written for the quartet. In April 2014 the quartet performed its jubilee concert (15 years QNG) at BKA theater in Berlin, which was also its last concert. The group has disbanded.

== Prizes and awards ==
- 2002 Stipendienpreis German Music Award, Bonn
- 2002 Musicprize of the Union Deutscher ZONTA-Clubs.
- 2002 1st Prize at the 13ème Concours international de Musique de Chambre in Illzach, France
- 2003 1st Prize in the Category Quartett/Quintett, Gaudeamus Preis for the best interpretation of a work by a composer from the Netherlands and Grand Prix at the "7th International Competition for Contemporary Music" in Kraków, [oland
- 2004 1st Prize at the "International Concert Artists Guild Competition 2004" in New York.
- 2006 Preisträger German Music Award, Bonn
- 2010 Winner of the competition Göttinger Reihe Historischer Musik, Performance Prize at the 2010 Göttingen International Handel Festival.

== Discography ==
- Ethereal, 2006, Edition Zeitklang
- in vain – von der Vergänglichkeit, 2008, Edition Genuin
- Fantasy 'n' Symmetry, 2012, Genuin Classics
