= Hans Maria Kneihs =

Austrian musician

Hans Maria Kneihs (born 1943) is a leading performer and teacher of the recorder. He was born in Vienna and studied at the Music Academy, later to become the Universität für Musik und Darstellende Kunst. Originally, he studied the violoncello and played with the ORF Symphony Orchestra. He also edited the Eulenberg mini-score of the CPE Bach Violoncello Concerto. During this time, he became interested in historically informed performance and turned increasingly to playing the recorder. In 1964, he was appointed as Professor of Recorder at the Vienna Hochschule, a post which he has held since. In addition, he has lectured all over the world and held a number of other positions, such as President of the Linz Musikhochschule. His extensive solo recordings include several of the concertos of Vivaldi and Telemann and a significant amount of Baroque chamber repertoire. He is also a noted performer of contemporary repertoire, and has recorded a number of the major twentieth century works for the instrument.

In 1972, Kneihs and five of his former students formed the Wiener Blockflöten Ensemble. This group, playing for the most part on instruments by the maker Bob Marvin, recorded a number of LPs and CDs. For thirteen years, they performed internationally, including most major European cities, Japan, the US and Canada.

Kneihs has also been active as an academic and editor. He has lectured and published extensively on interpretation and performance practice and, in addition to the CPE Bach score, has produced editions of Hotteterre and Telemann. As a tutor, he has taught internationally, including a number of appearances on Japanese television. Camerata, who are his main record label for CD recordings, are based in Japan.
