= Pete Rose (musician) =

American classical composer

Pete Rose (1942-2018) was an American recorder player, composer, and critic. He was the foremost interpreter of contemporary classical music for recorder, and one of the few recorder players to play jazz on the instrument.

As a performer, his repertoire included the music of Daniel Goode, Ryohei Hirose, Luciano Berio, and Benjamin Thorn. His many published works are enumerated on his web page.

Rose also penned a number of comprehensive articles documenting the use of the recorder in contemporary classical music, and numerous reviews of recorder music for the American Recorder magazine and others.

Pete Rose resided in Bridgewater, New Jersey where he also gave lessons to new and advancing recordists.

Following his death in 2018, American Recorder magazine, in its Winter 2018 issue, printed four pages of eulogies for Pete Rose (pp. 6-9).

== Discography ==
- 2004 - Recorderist Pete Rose (Pitch)
- Daniel Goode - Eight Thrushes in New York (Frog Peak Music)
