= Piers Adams =

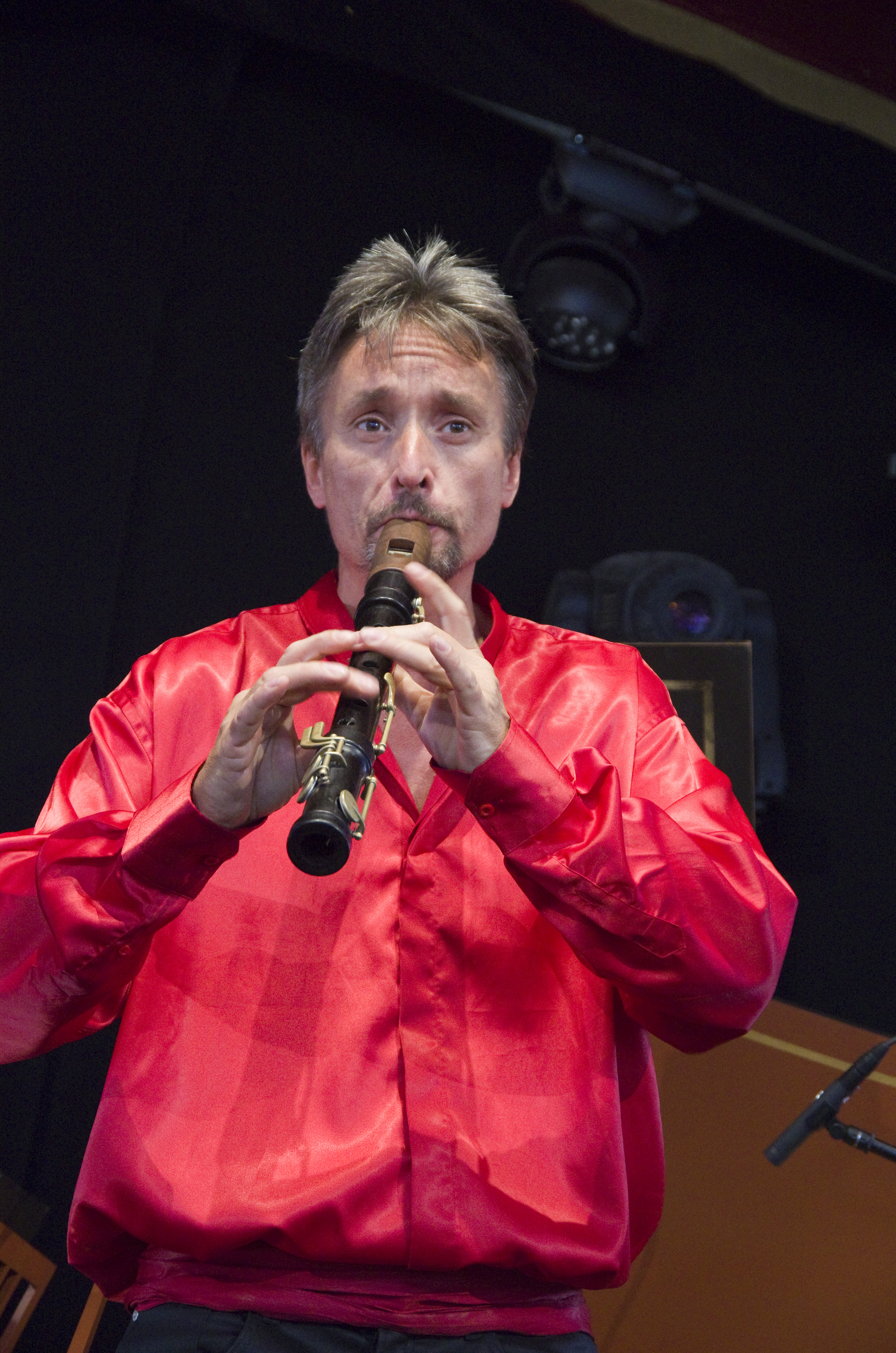

Background information
- Born: 21 December 1963 (age 61)
- Occupation: Recorder player
- Instrument: Recorder

Piers Adams (born 21 December 1963) is a British recorder player and member of baroque group Red Priest.

After attending Reading Blue Coat School Adams trained as a physicist at the University of Bristol, but turned professionally to the recorder at age 21.

Adams has received awards for his recorder playing, including first prize in the inaugural Moeck International Recorder Competition (1985) which led to debuts in London venues such as the Wigmore Hall and Royal Festival Hall.

As a concert soloist, Adams performs with orchestras including the BBC Symphony Orchestras, the Philharmonia, the Academy of Ancient Music, Guildhall Strings, the English Sinfonia, the City of London Sinfonia, London Musici and the Singapore Symphony Orchestra.

CD recordings range from his debut of Vivaldi Concertos (Cala) to David Bedford's Recorder Concerto (NMC). CDs include Recorder Bravura (romantic showpieces), Shine and Shade (20th century sonatas) and seven Red Priest CDs: Priest on the Run, Nightmare in Venice, The Four Seasons, Pirates of the Baroque, Johann, I'm Only Dancing, Handel in the wind and Baroque Bohemians, which reached No.1 in the UK Specialist Classical Charts in October 2018. In 2019 Adams recorded a baroque new-age crossover album, Bach Side of the Moon, which reached No. 5 in the international New Age Music charts.
