= Marion Verbruggen =

Dutch recorder player and teacher (born 1950)

Marion Verbruggen (born 1950) is a Dutch recorder player and teacher.

Verbruggen was born in Amsterdam and studied with Kees Otten at the Amsterdam Conservatory. She then studied at the Royal Conservatory of The Hague with Frans Brüggen. Upon completing her diplomas cum laude, she was invited to join the faculty at the Royal Conservatory. She is now a guest teacher there, and gives master-classes and workshops throughout the world.

Marion Verbruggen is one of the world's leading soloists on the recorder. Her discography ranges from 17th-century Spanish songs and theatre music to her own transcriptions of the cello suites by J.S. Bach. She is an ardent advocate of contemporary music.

Verbruggen made her conducting debut recently with the Portland Baroque Orchestra in Portland, Oregon.
