= Musical instrument classification =

Musical Instruments Around the World

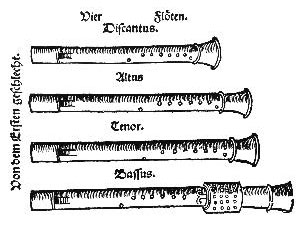
Variety of recorders from Martin Agricola's 1529 Musica instrumentalis deudsch (English: German Instrumental Music)

In organology, the study of musical instruments, many methods of classifying instruments exist. Most methods are specific to a particular cultural group and were developed to serve the musical needs of that culture. Culture-based classification methods sometimes break down when applied outside that culture. For example, a classification based on instrument use may fail when applied to another culture that uses the same instrument differently.

In the study of Western music, the most common classification method divides instruments into the following groups:

- String instruments (often subdivided between plucked and bowed instruments);
- Wind instruments (often subdivided between woodwinds and brass);
- Percussion instruments; and
- Electronic instruments

== Classification criteria ==
The criteria for classifying musical instruments vary according to point of view, time, and place. The many different approaches consider aspects such as the physical characteristics of the instrument (shape, construction, material composition, physical condition, etc.), the manner in which the instrument is played (plucked, bowed, etc.), the means by which the instrument produces sound, the quality or timbre of the sound produced by the instrument, the tonal and dynamic range of the instrument, the musical function of the instrument (rhythmic, melodic, etc.), and the place of the instrument in an orchestra or other ensemble.

== Classification systems by their geographical and historical origins ==
=== European and Western ===
2nd-century Greek grammarian, sophist, and rhetorician Julius Pollux, in the chapter called De Musica of his ten-volume Onomastikon, presented the two-class system, percussion (including strings) and winds, which persisted in medieval and postmedieval Europe. It was used by St. Augustine (4th and 5th centuries), in his De Ordine, applying the terms rhythmic (percussion and strings), organic (winds), and adding harmonic (the human voice); Isidore of Seville (6th to 7th centuries); Hugh of Saint Victor (12th century), also adding the voice; Magister Lambertus (13th century), adding the human voice as well; and Michael Praetorius (17th century).

The modern system divides instruments into wind, strings and percussion. It is of Greek origin (in the Hellenistic period, prominent proponents being Nicomachus and Porphyry). The scheme was later expanded by Martin Agricola, who distinguished plucked string instruments, such as guitars, from bowed string instruments, such as violins. Classical musicians today do not always maintain this division (although plucked strings are grouped separately from bowed strings in sheet music), but distinguish between wind instruments with a reed (woodwinds) and those where the air is set in motion directly by the lips (brass instruments).

Many instruments do not fit very neatly into this scheme. The serpent, for example, ought to be classified as a brass instrument, as a column of air is set in motion by the lips. However, it looks more like a woodwind instrument, and is closer to one in many ways, having finger-holes to control pitch, rather than valves.

Keyboard instruments do not fit easily into this scheme. For example, the piano has strings, but they are struck by hammers, so it is not clear whether it should be classified as a string instrument or a percussion instrument. For this reason, keyboard instruments are often regarded as inhabiting a category of their own, including all instruments played by a keyboard, whether they have struck strings (like the piano), plucked strings (like the harpsichord) or no strings at all (like the celesta).

It might be said that with these extra categories, the classical system of instrument classification focuses less on the fundamental way in which instruments produce sound, and more on the technique required to play them.

Various names have been assigned to these three traditional Western groupings:

- Boethius (5th and 6th centuries) labelled them intensione ut nervis, spiritu ut tibiis ("breath in the tube"), and percussione;
- Cassiodorus, a younger contemporary of Boethius, used the names tensibilia, percussionalia, and inflatilia;
- Roger Bacon (13th century) dubbed them tensilia, inflativa, and percussionalia;
- Ugolino da Orvieto (14th and 15th centuries) called them intensione ut nervis, spiritu ut tibiis, and percussione;
- Sebastien de Brossard (1703) referred to them as enchorda or entata (but only for instruments with several strings), pneumatica or empneousta, and krusta (from the Greek for hit or strike) or pulsatilia (for percussives);
- Filippo Bonanni (1722) used vernacular names: sonori per il fiato, sonori per la tensione, and sonori per la percussione;
- Joseph Majer (1732) called them pneumatica, pulsatilia (percussives including plucked instruments), and fidicina (from fidula, fiddle) (for bowed instruments);
- Johann Eisel (1738) dubbed them pneumatica, pulsatilia, and fidicina;
- Johannes de Muris (1784) used the terms chordalia, foraminalia (from foramina, "bore" in reference to the bored tubes), and vasalia (for "vessels");
- Regino of Prum (1784) called them tensibile, inflatile, and percussionabile.

==== Mahillon and Hornbostel–Sachs systems ====
Victor-Charles Mahillon, curator of the musical instrument collection of the conservatoire in Brussels, for the 1888 catalogue of the collection divided instruments into four groups and assigned Greek-derived labels to the four classifications: chordophones (stringed instruments), membranophones (skin-head percussion instruments), aerophones (wind instruments), and autophones (non-skin percussion instruments). This scheme was later taken up by Erich von Hornbostel and Curt Sachs who published an extensive new scheme for classification in Zeitschrift für Ethnologie in 1914. Their scheme is widely used today, and is most often known as the Hornbostel–Sachs system (or the Sachs–Hornbostel system).

The original Sachs–Hornbostel system classified instruments into four main groups:

1. idiophones, such as the xylophone, which produce sound by vibrating themselves;
2. membranophones, such as drums or kazoos, which produce sound by a vibrating membrane;
3. chordophones, such as the piano or cello, which produce sound by vibrating strings;
4. aerophones, such as the pipe organ or oboe, which produce sound by vibrating columns of air.

Later Sachs added a fifth category, electrophones, such as theremins, which produce sound by electronic means. Modern synthesizers and electronic instruments fall in this category. Within each category are many subgroups. The system has been criticized and revised over the years, but remains widely used by ethnomusicologists and organologists. One notable example of this criticism is that care should be taken with electrophones, as some electronic instruments like the electric guitar (chordophone) and some electronic keyboards (sometimes idiophones or chordophones) can produce music without electricity or the use of an amplifier.

In the Hornbostel–Sachs classification of musical instruments, lamellophones are considered plucked idiophones, a category that includes various forms of jaw harp and the European mechanical music box, as well as the huge variety of African and Afro-Latin thumb pianos such as the mbira and marimbula.

==== André Schaeffner ====
In 1932, comparative musicologist (ethnomusicologist) André Schaeffner developed a new classification scheme that was "exhaustive, potentially covering all real and conceivable instruments".

Schaeffner's system has only two top-level categories which he denoted by Roman numerals:

- I: instruments that make sound from vibrating solids:
  - I.A: no tension (free solid, for example, xylophones, cymbals, or claves);
  - I.B: linguaphones (lamellophones) (solid fixed at only one end, such as a kalimba or thumb piano);
  - I.C: chordophones (solid fixed at both ends, i.e. strings such as piano or harp); plus drums
- II: instruments that make sound from vibrating air (such as clarinets, trumpets, or bull-roarers.)

The system agrees with Mahillon and Hornbostel–Sachs for chordophones, but groups percussion instruments differently.

The MSA (Multi-Dimensional Scalogram Analysis) of René Lysloff and Jim Matson, using 37 variables, including characteristics of the sounding body, resonator, substructure, sympathetic vibrator, performance context, social context, and instrument tuning and construction, corroborated Schaeffner, producing two categories, aerophones and the chordophone-membranophone-idiophone combination.

André Schaeffner has been president of the French association of musicologists Société française de musicologie (1958–1967).

==== Kurt Reinhard ====
In 1960, German musicologist Kurt Reinhard presented a stylistic taxonomy, as opposed to a morphological one, with two divisions determined by either single or multiple voices playing. Each of these two divisions was subdivided according to pitch changeability (not changeable, freely changeable, and changeable by fixed intervals), and also by tonal continuity (discontinuous (as the marimba and drums) and continuous (the friction instruments (including bowed) and the winds), making 12 categories. He also proposed classification according to whether they had dynamic tonal variability, a characteristic that separates whole eras (e.g., the baroque from the classical) as in the transition from the terraced dynamics of the harpsichord to the crescendo of the piano, grading by degree of absolute loudness, timbral spectra, tunability, and degree of resonance.

==== Steve Mann ====
In 2007, Steve Mann presented a five-class, physics-based organology elaborating on the classification proposed by Schaeffner. This system is composed of gaiaphones (chordophones, membranophones, and idiophones), hydraulophones, aerophones, plasmaphones, and quintephones (electrically and optically produced music), the names referring to the five essences, earth, water, wind, fire and the quintessence, thus adding three new categories to the Schaeffner taxonomy.

Elementary organology, also known as physical organology, is a classification scheme based on the elements (i.e. states of matter) in which sound production takes place. "Elementary" refers both to "element" (state of matter) and to something that is fundamental or innate (physical). The elementary organology map can be traced to Kartomi, Schaeffner, Yamaguchi, and others, as well as to the Greek and Roman concepts of elementary classification of all objects, not just musical instruments.

Elementary organology categorizes musical instruments by their classical element:

	Element	State	Category	
1	Earth	solids	gaiaphones	the first category proposed by Andre Schaeffner
2	Water	liquids	hydraulophones	
3	Air	gases	aerophones	the second category proposed by Andre Schaeffner
4	Fire	plasmas	plasmaphones	
5	Quintessence/Idea	informatics	quintephones	

Musical instrument classification in physics-based organology.

=== Other Western classifications ===
==== Classification by tonal range ====
Instruments can be classified by their musical range in comparison with other instruments in the same family. These terms are named after singing voice classifications:

- Higher-than-sopranino instruments: the garklein recorder in C (also known as the sopranissimo recorder, or piccolo recorder), soprillo saxophone, piccolo, piccolo clarinet, piccolo trumpet
- Sopranino instruments: sopranino recorder, sopranino saxophone, treble flute, sopranino clarinet, violino piccolo
- Soprano instruments: concert flute, soprano clarinet, basset clarinet, soprano recorder, violin, trumpet, oboe, soprano saxophone, soprano sarrusophone, glockenspiel, celesta
- Alto instruments: alto flute, alto recorder, viola, French horn, natural horn, alto horn, alto clarinet, alto saxophone, alto sarrusophone, English horn, xylophone, vibraphone
- Tenor instruments: trombone, euphonium, tenor violin, tenor flute, basset horn, tenor saxophone, tenor sarrusophone, tenoroon, tenor recorder, bass flute, tenor drum, harpsichord, harp, guitar, marimba
- Baritone instruments: cello, baritone horn, bass clarinet, bassoon, baritone saxophone, baritone sarrusophone
- Bass instruments: bass recorder, bass oboe, bass tuba, bass saxophone, bass sarrusophone, bass trombone, bass guitar, bass drum
- Lower-than-bass instruments: contrabass tuba, double bass, contrabassoon, contrabass clarinet, contrabass saxophone, contrabass sarrusophone, subcontrabass saxophone, tubax, octobass

Some instruments fall into more than one category: for example, the cello may be considered either tenor or bass, depending on how its music fits into the ensemble, and the trombone may be alto, tenor, or bass and the French horn, bass, baritone, tenor, or alto, depending on which range it is played. In a typical concert band setting, the first alto saxophone covers soprano parts, while the second alto saxophone covers alto parts.

Many instruments include their range as part of their name: soprano saxophone, alto saxophone, tenor saxophone, baritone saxophone, baritone horn, alto flute, bass flute, bass guitar, etc. Additional adjectives describe instruments above the soprano range or below the bass, for example: sopranino recorder, sopranino saxophone, contrabass recorder, contrabass clarinet.

When used in the name of an instrument, these terms are relative, describing the instrument's range in comparison to other instruments of its family and not in comparison to the human voice range or instruments of other families. For example, a bass flute's range is from C_{3} to F♯_{6}, while a bass clarinet plays about one octave lower.

==== Classification by function ====
Instruments can be categorized according to typical use, such as signal instruments, a category that may include instruments in different Hornbostel–Sachs categories such as trumpets, drums, and gongs. An example based on this criterion is Bonanni (e.g., festive, military, and religious). He separately classified them according to geography and era.

Instruments can be classified according to the role they play in the ensemble. For example, the horn section in popular music typically includes both brass instruments and woodwind instruments. The symphony orchestra typically has the strings in the front, the woodwinds in the middle, and the basses, brass, and percussion in the back.

==== Classification by geographical or ethnic origin ====
Jean-Benjamin de la Borde (1780) classified instruments according to ethnicity, his categories being Black, Abyssinian, Chinese, Arabic, Turkish, and Greek.

=== West and South Asian ===
==== Indian ====
An ancient system of Indian origin, in the Natya Shastra, a theoretical treatise on music and dramaturgy by Bharata Muni composed between about 200 BC and AD 200, divides instruments (vadya) into four main classification groups: instruments where the sound is produced by vibrating strings (tata vadya, "stretched instruments"); instruments where the sound is produced by vibrating columns of air (susira vadya, "hollow instruments"); percussion instruments made of wood or metal (Ghana vadya, "solid instruments"); and percussion instruments with skin heads, or drums (avanaddha vadya, "covered instruments").

==== Persian ====
Al-Farabi, Persian scholar of the 10th century, distinguished tonal duration. In one of his four schemes, in his two-volume Kitab al-Musiki al-Kabir (Great Book of Music) he identified five classes, in order of ranking, as follows: the human voice, the bowed strings (the rebab) and winds, plucked strings, percussion, and dance, the first three pointed out as having continuous tone.

Ibn Sina, Persian scholar of the 11th century, presented a scheme in his Kitab al-Najat (Book of the Delivery), made the same distinction. He used two classes. In his Kitab al-Shifa (Book of Soul Healing), he proposed another taxonomy, of five classes: fretted instruments; unfretted (open) stringed, lyres and harps; bowed stringed; wind (reeds and some other woodwinds, such as the flute and bagpipe), other wind instruments such as the organ; and the stick-struck santur (a board zither). The distinction between fretted and open was in classic Persian fashion.

==== Turkish ====
Ottoman encyclopedist Hadji Khalifa (17th century) recognized three classes of musical instruments in his Kashf al-Zunun an Asami al-Kutub wa al-Funun (Clarification and Conjecture About the Names of Books and Sciences), a treatise on the origin and construction of instruments. This was exceptional for a Near Eastern writer, most of whom, like Near Eastern culture traditionally and early Hellenistic Greeks, ignored the percussion instruments because it regarded them as primitive.

=== East and South-East Asian ===
==== Chinese ====
The oldest known scheme of classifying instruments is Chinese and may date as far back as the second millennium BC. It grouped instruments according to the materials they are made of. Instruments made of stone were in one group, those of wood in another, those of silk are in a third, and those of bamboo in a fourth, as recorded in the Yo Chi (record of ritual music and dance), compiled from sources of the Chou period (9th–5th centuries BC) and corresponding to the four seasons and four winds.

The eight-fold system of eight sounds or timbres (八音, bā yīn), from the same source, occurred gradually, and in the legendary Emperor Shun's time (3rd millennium BC) it is believed to have been presented in the following order: metal (金, jīn), stone (石, shí), silk (絲, sī), bamboo (竹, zhú), gourd (匏, páo), clay (土, tǔ), leather (革, gé), and wood (木, mù) classes, and it correlated to the eight seasons and eight winds of Chinese culture, autumn and west, autumn-winter and NW, summer and south, spring and east, winter-spring and NE, summer-autumn and SW, winter and north, and spring-summer and SE, respectively.

However, the Chou-Li (Rites of Chou), an anonymous treatise compiled from earlier sources in about the 2nd century BC, had the following order: metal, stone, clay, leather, silk, wood, gourd, and bamboo. The same order was presented in the Tso Chuan (Commentary of Tso), attributed to Tso Chiu-Ming, probably compiled in the 4th century BC.

Much later, Ming dynasty (14th–17th century) scholar Chu Tsai Yu recognized three groups: those instruments using muscle power or used for musical accompaniment, those that are blown, and those that are rhythmic, a scheme which was probably the first scholarly attempt, while the earlier ones were traditional, folk taxonomies.

More usually, instruments are classified according to how the sound is initially produced (regardless of post-processing, i.e., an electric guitar is still a string-instrument regardless of what analog or digital/computational post-processing effects pedals may be used with it).

==== Indonesian ====
Classifications done for the Indonesian ensemble, the gamelan, were done by Jaap Kunst (1949), Martopangrawit, Poerbapangrawit, and Sumarsam (all in 1984). Kunst described five categories: nuclear theme (cantus firmus in Latin and balungan ("skeletal framework") in Indonesian); colotomic (a word invented by Kunst, meaning "interpunctuating"), the gongs; countermelodic; paraphrasing (panerusan), subdivided as close to the nuclear theme and ornamental filling; agogic (tempo-regulating), drums.

R. Ng. Martopangrawit has two categories, irama (the rhythm instruments) and lagu (the melodic instruments), the former corresponds to Kunst's classes 2 and 5, and the latter to Kunst's 1, 3, and 4.

Kodrat Poerbapangrawit, similar to Kunst, derives six categories: balungan, the saron, demung, and slenthem; rerenggan (ornamental), the gendèr, gambang, and bonang); wiletan (variable formulaic melodic), rebab and male chorus (gerong); singgetan (interpunctuating); kembang (floral), flute and female voice; jejeging wirama (tempo regulating), drums.

Sumarsam's scheme comprises

- an inner melodic group (lagu)(with a wide range), divided as
  - elaborating (rebab, gerong, gendèr (a metallophone), gambang (a xylophone), pesindhen (female voice), celempung (plucked strings), suling (flute));
  - mediating ( between the 1st and 3rd subdivisions (bonang (gong-chimes), saron panerus(a loud metallophone); and
  - abstracting (balungan, "melodic abstraction")( with a 1-octave range), loud and soft metallophones (saron barung, demung, and slenthem);
- an outer circle, the structural group (gongs), which underlines the structure of the work;
- and occupying the space outside the outer circle, the kendang, a tempo-regulating group (drums).

The gamelan is also divided into front, middle, and back, much like the symphony orchestra.

An orally transmitted Javanese taxonomy has 8 groupings:

- ricikan dijagur ("instruments beaten with a padded hammer," e.g., suspended gongs);
- ricikan dithuthuk ("instruments knocked with a hard or semihard hammer," e.g., saron (similar to the glockenspiel) and gong-chimes);
- ricikan dikebuk ("hand-beaten instruments", e.g., kendhang (drum));
- ricikan dipethik ("plucked instruments");
- ricikan disendal ("pulled instruments," e.g., genggong (jaw harp with string mechanism));
- ricikan dikosok ("bowed instruments");
- ricikan disebul ("blown instruments");
- ricikan dikocok ("shaken instruments").

A Javanese classification transmitted in literary form is as follows:

- ricikan prunggu/wesi ("instruments made of bronze or iron");
- ricikan kulit ("leather instruments", drums);
- ricikan kayu ("wooden instruments");
- ricikan kawat/tali ("string instruments");
- ricikan bambu pring ("bamboo instruments", e.g., flutes).

This is much like the pa yin. It is suspected of being old but its age is unknown.

Minangkabau musicians (of West Sumatra) use the following taxonomy for bunyi-bunyian ("objects that sound"): dipukua ("beaten"), dipupuik ("blown), dipatiek ("plucked"), ditariek ("pulled"), digesek ("bowed"), dipusiang ("swung"). The last one is for the bull-roarer. They also distinguish instruments on the basis of origin because of sociohistorical contacts, and recognize three categories: Mindangkabau (Minangkabau asli), Arabic (asal Arab), and Western (asal Barat), each of these divided up according to the five categories. Classifying musical instruments on the basis sociohistorical factors as well as mode of sound production is common in Indonesia.

The Batak of North Sumatra recognize the following classes: beaten (alat pukul or alat palu), blown (alat tiup), bowed (alat gesek), and plucked (alat petik) instruments, but their primary classification is of ensembles.

==== Philippines ====
The T'boli of Mindanao use three categories, grouping the strings (t'duk) with the winds (nawa) together based on a gentleness-strength dichotomy (lemnoy-megel, respectively), regarding the percussion group (tembol) as strong and the winds-strings group as gentle. The division pervades T'boli thought about cosmology, social characters of men and women, and artistic styles.

=== African ===
==== West African ====
In West Africa, tribes such as the Dan, Gio, Kpelle, Hausa, Akan, and Dogon, use a human-centered system. It derives from 4 myth-based parameters: the musical instrument's nonhuman owner (spirit, mask, sorcerer, or animal), the mode of transmission to the human realm (by gift, exchange, contract, or removal), the making of the instrument by a human (according to instructions from a nonhuman, for instance), and the first human owner. Most instruments are said to have a nonhuman origin, but some are believed invented by humans, e.g., the xylophone and the lamellophone.

The Kpelle of West Africa distinguish the struck (yàle), including both beaten and plucked, and the blown (fêe). The yàle group is subdivided into five categories: instruments possessing lamellas (the sanzas); those possessing strings; those possessing a membrane (various drums); hollow wooden, iron, or bottle containers; and various rattles and bells. The Hausa, also of West Africa, classify drummers into those who beat drums and those who beat (pluck) strings (the other four player classes are blowers, singers, acclaimers, and talkers),

== See also ==
- Classification of percussion instruments
- Organology
- List of musical instruments
- Signal instrument
