= Sub-contrabass recorder =

Very low pitched instrument in recorder family

Subcontrabass recorder
Woodwind instrument
- Classification: Wind; Woodwind; Aerophone
- Hornbostel–Sachs classification: 421.221.12 (Flute with internal duct and finger holes)

Related instruments
- Bass recorder; Contrabass recorder; Great bass recorder; Tenor recorder

The sub-contrabass recorder is a member of the recorder family with a low note of FF (or F_{1} in SPN). It is manufactured with a square or rectangular cross-sectional design, which was first patented in 1975 by Joachim and Herbert Paetzold. They are made from plywood and have a doubled-back bore like a bassoon, which reduces the exterior length of the instrument. They also have wooden keys. Through this special and proprietary design, the instrument can be played with a very short bocal.

== See also ==
- Sub-great bass recorder for an image
