= Playing the Fool =

Playing the Fool – The Official Live

Live album by Gentle Giant
- Released: 18 January 1977
- Recorded: 23 September – 7 October 1976
- Venues: Düsseldorf, Paris, Brussels and Munich
- Genre: Progressive rock
- Length: 78:06 (original album); 103:13 (2025 complete edition)
- Labels: Chrysalis (UK); Capitol (US)
- Producer: Gentle Giant

Gentle Giant chronology
Interview (1976)	Playing the Fool – The Official Live (1977)	The Missing Piece (1977)

Professional ratings
Review scores
Source	Rating
Allmusic	link
Babyblaue Seiten	14.33/15 link
Sea of Tranquility	link

Playing the Fool – The Official Live is a live album by the British progressive rock band Gentle Giant which was released in 1977. Its release and title were prompted in part by the circulation of live bootlegs in the preceding year, most notably Playing the Foole – A Stake in the Heart. The original UK LP was issued with a 12-page booklet. The track "Sweet Georgia Brown" was an on-the-spot performance, played while Kerry Minnear's keyboards were being repaired during a concert.

In 2025, the band issued an expanded and remixed edition as a double CD, triple LP and Dolby Atmos Blu-ray mix (including song visuals). This version restored the songs to their original running order and included additional material from the band's most recent studio album at the time, Interview.

== Track listing ==
All tracks are written by Kerry Minnear, Derek Shulman, and Ray Shulman except where noted. The songwriting credits are taken from the studio albums the songs originally appeared on, which are noted for each track; this live album release excised all songwriting credits for Phil Shulman, who had left Gentle Giant on bad terms in 1973.

Side one
No.	Title	Notes	Length
1.	"Just the Same/Proclamation" (from Free Hand / The Power and the Glory)	Düsseldorf, 1976-09-23	11:13
2.	"On Reflection" (from Free Hand)	Düsseldorf, 1976-09-23	6:20

Side two
No.	Title	Writer(s)	Notes	Length
3.	"Excerpts from Octopus (The Boys in the Band/Raconteur Troubadour/Acquiring the Taste/Knots/Organ Bridge/The Advent of Panurge)" (from Octopus / Acquiring the Taste)	Minnear, Shulman, Shulman, Phil Shulman	Paris, 1976-10-05	15:35
4.	"Funny Ways" (from Gentle Giant)	Minnear, Shulman, Shulman, Shulman	Munich, 1976-09-25	8:35

Side three
No.	Title	Notes	Length
5.	"The Runaway/Experience" (from In a Glass House)	Paris, 1976-10-05	9:31
6.	"So Sincere" (from The Power and the Glory)	Paris, 1976-10-05	10:22

Side four
No.	Title	Writer(s)	Notes	Length
7.	"Free Hand" (from Free Hand)		Brussels, 1976-10-07	7:40
8.	"Sweet Georgia Brown"	Ben Bernie, Maceo Pinkard	Brussels, 1976-10-07	1:15
9.	"Peel the Paint/I Lost My Head" (from Three Friends / Interview)	Minnear, Shulman, Shulman, Shulman ("Peel the Paint")	Paris, 1976-10-05	7:35

=== 35th Anniversary Edition ===
Disc one
No.	Title	Length
1.	"Just the Same"	5:57
2.	"Proclamation/Valedictory"	5:18
3.	"On Reflection"	6:20
4.	"Excerpts from Octopus"	15:39
5.	"Funny Ways"	8:30
Total length:		41:44

Disc two
No.	Title	Length
6.	"The Runaway"	3:56
7.	"Experience"	5:36
8.	"So Sincere"	10:20
9.	"Free Hand"	7:40
10.	"Sweet Georgia Brown (Breakdown in Brussels)"	1:21
11.	"Peel the Paint/I Lost My Head"	7:32
Total length:		36:25

The track listing and times differ depending on the specific release.

=== The Complete Live Experience (2025 LP) ===
Disc one
No.	Title	Notes	Length
1.	"Intro"		1:24
2.	"Just the Same / Proclamation"	(°)	11:32
3.	"On Reflection"		6:32
4.	"Interview"	(§)	7:19
Total length:			26:47

Disc two
No.	Title	Length
5.	"The Runaway / Experience"	9:40
6.	"Sweet Georgia Brown (Breakdown in Brussels)"	1:54
7.	"So Sincere"	10:42
8.	"Excerpts from Octopus"	16:00
9.	"Band Introduction"	1:32
Total length:		39:48

Disc three
No.	Title	Notes	Length
10.	"Funny Ways"	(°)	8:51
11.	"Timing / Violin Solo"	(§)	11:40
12.	"Free Hand"		8:13
13.	"Peel the Paint / I Lost My Head"		8:01
Total length:			36:45

(§) track not included in the original release

(°) different live performances than the original release

== Personnel ==
Gentle Giant

- Derek Shulman – vocals, alto saxophone, descant recorder, bass and percussion
- Ray Shulman – bass, violin, acoustic guitar, descant recorder, trumpet, vocals and percussion
- Kerry Minnear – all keyboards, cello, vibes, tenor recorder, vocals and percussion
- Gary Green – electric, acoustic and 12-string guitars, alto and descant recorders, vocals and percussion
- John Weathers – drums, vibes, tambourine, vocals and percussion

== Charts ==
Year	Chart	Position
1977	US Billboard 200	89
