= Kleine Flöte =

Kleine Flöte (German for "small flute") can refer to:

- piccolo
- Sopranino recorder, in use of Michael Praetorius
- Alto recorder, in usage of Sebastian Virdung
