= The Royal Wind Music =

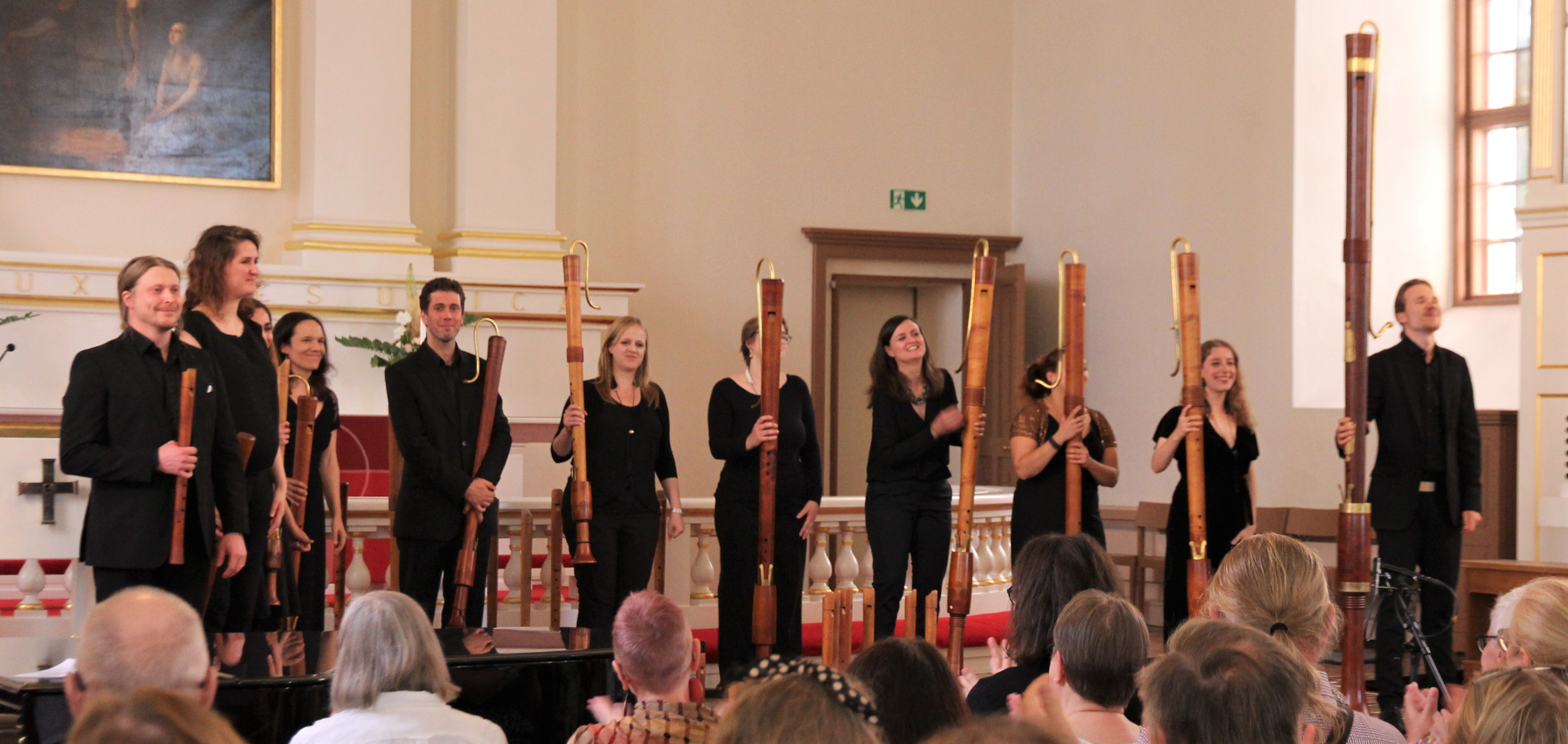
- The Royal Wind Music - a Dutch recorder consort - during a concert in Kuopio cathedral, July 21, 2019.

Background information
- Origin: The Netherlands
- Years active: 1997–present
- Label: Lindoro
- Members: Stephanie Brandt, Francesca Clements, Hester Groenleer, Marco Paulo Alves Magalhães, María Martínez Ayerza, Filipa Margarida da Silveira Pereira, Anna Stegmann, Paul J.W. Schauenburg, Kristy van Dijk, Juho Myllylä, Daniel Scott, Irene Sorozábal Moreno, Johanna Boehm
- Past members: Petri Arvo, Kamala Bain, Verena Barié, Alana Blackburn, Andreas Böhlen, Erik Bosgraaf, Ruth Dyson, Belén Nieto Galán, Eva Gemeinhardt, Arwieke Glas, Karin Hageneder, Dianne Heijstee, Sarah Jeffery, Dorottya Kis, Matthijs Lunenburg, Amy Power, Monika Ruusmaa, Yi-Chang Liang, Hidehiro Nakamura
- Website: www.royalwindmusic.org

The Royal Wind Music is a Dutch recorder consort.

Founded by Paul Leenhouts in 1997, The Royal Wind Music is a consort of thirteen former students of the Amsterdam Conservatoire. They use a large range of Renaissance recorders by Adriana Breukink and Bob Marvin, from a 15 cm sopranino to a three-meter-long (9.8 ft) sub-contrabass. They have performed throughout Europe and the United States, including the Festival Oude Muziek Utrecht and Boston Early Music Festival. Since 2010, they have performed without a conductor.

With the goal of bringing Renaissance music to life, they perform arrangements of music originally composed for other instruments from the period 1520-1640 and have become one of the leading examples of the recorder orchestra movement.

In 2006, they won the Noorderkerk prize at the Vriendenkrans concours, jointly organized by the Concertgebouw Amsterdam and the Concertgebouw Orchestra. In 2012, they organized the a four-day festival and competition Open Recorder Days Amsterdam, as well as a second festival in 2015.

== Recorded music ==
They record for Lindoro, including:

- Sweete Musicke of Sundrie Kindes (2015)
- En Er Mundo (2014)
- Angeli, Zingare & Patori (2013)
- A Noble Noyse of Musicke (2013)
- Del Canto Figurado (2012)
- The Flute-Heaven of the Gods (2009)
- Alla dolce ombra (2002)
