= Voice flute =

Musical instrument

The voice flute (also the Italian flauto di voce and the French flûte de voix are found in English-language sources) is a recorder with the lowest note of D_{4}, and is therefore intermediate in size between the alto and tenor recorders.

Although sometimes regarded as a small tenor, a tone higher than the usual one in C_{4},) it was treated historically and is most often in modern times described as a large alto.( Though it has been speculated that the name might refer to the instrument's range, which is roughly equivalent to that of the soprano voice, the origin of the term "voice flute" is obscure.)

Revived in the early twentieth century along with other sizes of recorder, it is used today as it was in the eighteenth century—as a substitute for the transverse flute—though it also has a small repertoire of music composed specially for it, from both the Baroque and modern periods.

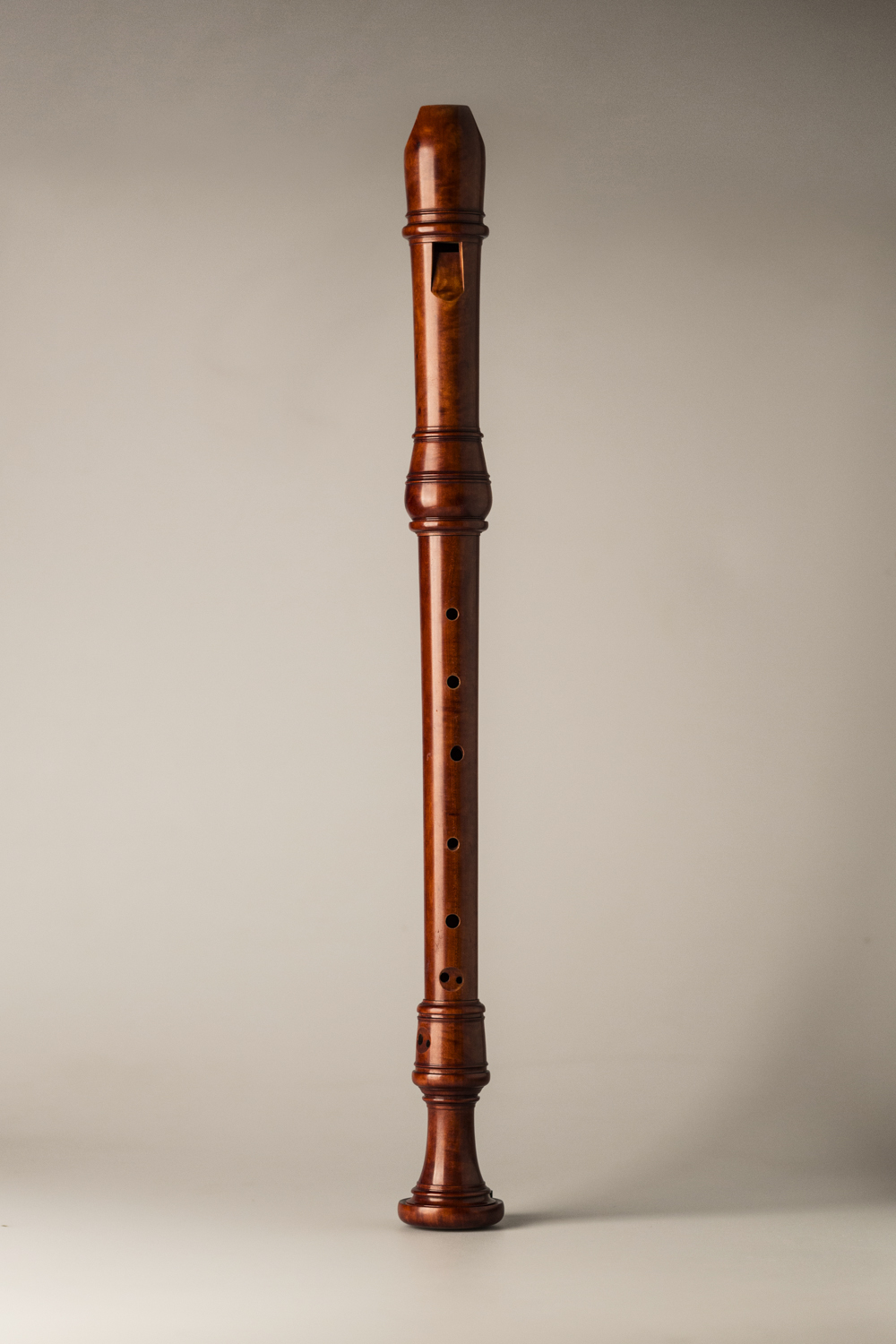
A Baroque voice flute after Bressan

== History ==
The voice flute was a popular size of recorder in the eighteenth century, especially in England. It offered an alternative instrument for amateurs to play music written for the transverse flute, since both instruments are at the same pitch. The usual clef used for recorder parts was the French violin clef, with G on the bottom line of the staff. Imagining this clef in place of the treble clef and using the normal F-alto fingerings on a voice flute renders music composed for flute or violin in the original key. Although the rather large number of surviving eighteenth-century voice flutes suggests this may have been a common practice at that time, there is little documentary evidence to support the idea. Parts intended for this instrument were also often written in transposed notation, so the player could imagine he was playing an ordinary alto in F.

== Baroque repertoire ==
Important Baroque works composed specifically for the voice flute include the first four suites (in A major, D major, E minor, and B minor) from a set of six with accompaniment of archlute and viola da gamba, published in 1701 by Francis (Charles) Dieupart, a Quintet in B minor for the unusual combination of two voice flutes and two transverse flutes with continuo, attributed to one of the Loeillets in a Rostock manuscript, and the two obbligato recorder parts in Bach's cantata Komm, du süße Todesstunde, BWV 161. It is also probable that the voice flute is the type of recorder Bach intended for the obbligato part in Cantata 152, Tritt auf die Glaubensbahn, where the pitch of Bach's organ (the Chorton or choir pitch) was a minor third higher than the Cammerton (chamber pitch) of the other instruments.

== Eighteenth-century instruments and makers ==
A significant number of historical voice flutes survive in museums and private collections. The largest number by a single maker are the 15 (or 16) voice flutes (at a conservative count) by the London maker P. I. (Peter) Bressan, accounting for a fifth of the total of 76 (to 78) surviving recorders from his workshop. A more liberal count, including instruments possibly but not certainly by Bressan puts the number of voice flutes at sixteen, out of a total of 77 surviving recorders. At least two of these instruments appear to be "left handed"—that is, they are meant to be played with the right hand uppermost. There are other surviving English voice flutes from Thomas Stanesby Sr., Joseph Bradbury, Thomas Cahusac, and a very late example by (probably) Valentine Metzler, as well as one by the Dublin maker John Neale.Montagu 2002, 152

Continental examples also exist, from the Nuremberg families of Denner (one each by Jacob and Johann Christoph Denner) and Oberlender, and three instruments by one or the other of the father-and-son Amsterdam makers Willem Beukers Sr. and Jr. French instruments are scarcer, but one voice flute survives from the Paris workshop of Pierre Naust, and an instrument in the Bate collection in Oxford, which formerly belonged to Edgar Hunt, bears the maker's name Hail, who may have been French. Italian instruments are also infrequent, but three surviving voice flutes from Venice bear the maker's name "Castel", all with the initial "N".

== Modern use ==
The revival of interest in the recorder in the twentieth century was stimulated by Arnold Dolmetsch, who began making copies of surviving early recorders in 1919. Shortly after founding the Haslemere Festival in 1925, he put his son Carl (then aged 15) in charge of recorder development. In addition to the descant (soprano), treble (alto), tenor, and bass sizes of recorders (usually tuned at A = 415 Hz) he produced for the needs of the Festival low alto recorders in E♭ for Bach's cantata Gottes Zeit ist die allerbeste Zeit, BWV 106, sixth flutes for concertos by Woodcock and other eighteenth-century English composers, and voice flutes. The latter were used to play parts written for transverse flutes since, before 1930, there was no one in the Haslemere circle who had mastered the embouchure of the Baroque one-keyed flute.

In Germany between the two world wars both soprano and alto recorders were made in different sizes, in part because of the difficulty of playing the cross-fingered flats and sharps on instruments using so-called German fingering, but also to exploit differences in timbre and response. In addition to the soprano in C_{5}, there were instruments made in D_{5}, B_{4}, B♭_{4}, and A_{4}; in addition to the usual alto in F_{4}, there were also instruments in G_{4}, E_{4}, E♭_{4} and D_{4}, the last corresponding to the 18th-century voice flute. A conference to discuss these differences in size, held in 1931, concluded that the larger instruments in A and D were to be preferred, though this position was later partially countermanded by the Hitler Youth leadership, who permitted the D and A instruments "only for the purposes of chamber music; for folk music, for the sake of uniformity throughout the German Reich, it considers only the pitches C and F".

Music was composed specifically for the alto in D, such as Johann Nepomuk David's Variations on an Original Theme for recorder and lute, Op. 32, No. 2 (1943), which is also cited as a rare pre-1960 example of the use of flutter-tongue on the recorder. A much better-known piece is the Trio from Paul Hindemith's Plöner Musiktag (1932), which originally was for one soprano in A and two altos in D, though when eventually published it was transposed (with the composer's blessing) by the editor, Walter Bergmann, for soprano in C and two altos in F.

The first notable avant-garde work for the tenor recorder, Makoto Shinohara's Fragmente (1968), has come to be performed by many players on the voice flute by preference.

More recently, Australian composer Zana Clarke has written two works for the instrument: Cold Honey (1997) for either voice flute or tenor recorder, and Gentle Walker (1998) for both voice flute and tenor recorder, composed for and dedicated to Ben Ayre.

In 2022 Israeli composer Gilad Hochman added "By These Rivers" to the Voice flute's repertoire, exploring new modal expressions of the instrument in connection to the textual source of Psalm 137 ("By the rivers of Babylon").
