= Denner =

Denner is a name. Notable people with the name include:

== Given name ==
- Denner (footballer, born 1993), Denner Paulino Barbosa, Brazilian football left-back
- Denner (footballer, born 1999), Denner Fernando Melz, Brazilian football midfielder
- Denner (footballer, born 2008), Denner Alves Evangelista Pereira, Brazilian football left back

== Surname ==
- Balthasar Denner (1685–1749), German painter
- Charles Denner, French actor
- Jacob Denner, woodwind instrument maker, son of Johann
- Johann Christoph Denner, (1655–1707), woodwind instrument maker
- Pat Denner, American neon sign maker

== See also ==
- Denner (supermarkets), Swiss supermarket chain
