= Garklein recorder =

Smallest size of the recorder family

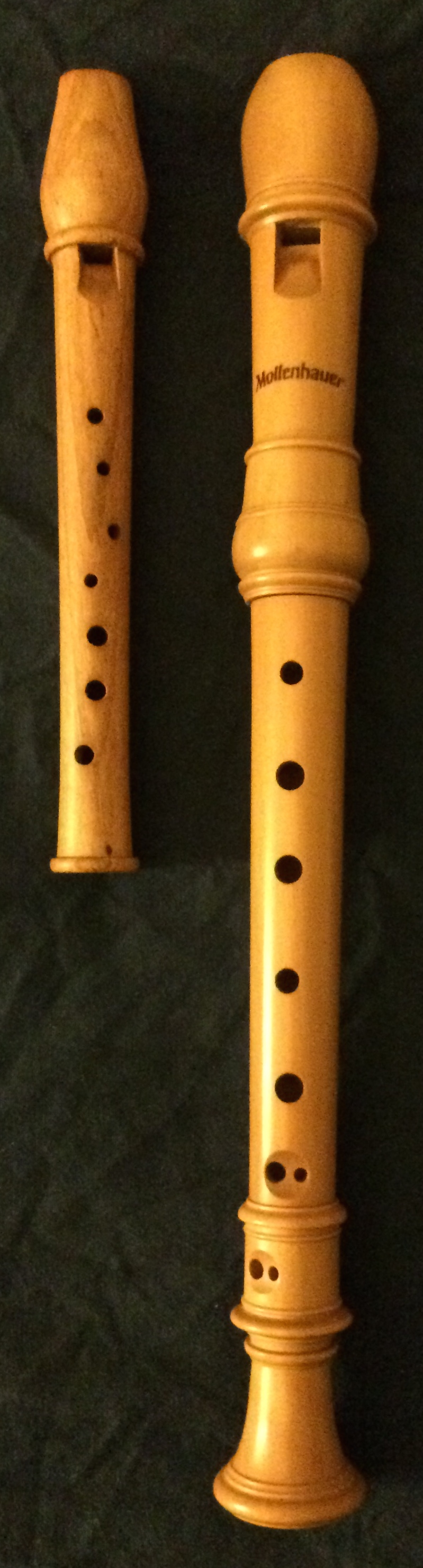
One-piece garklein recorder, next to a three-piece soprano recorder

The garklein recorder in C, also known as the sopranissimo recorder or piccolo recorder, is the smallest size of the recorder family. Its range is C_{6}–A_{7} (C_{8}). The name garklein is German for "quite small", and is also sometimes used to describe the sopranino in G. Although some modern German makers use the single-word form Garkleinflötlein, this is without historical precedent. Double holes for the two lowest notes (used on the larger recorders to achieve a fully chromatic scale) are uncommon. The instrument is usually notated in the treble clef two octaves lower than its actual sound. The garklein recorder is only about 16 to 18 cm long and is different from larger recorders in that it is usually made in one piece due to its size.

This very small recorder was unknown before the Baroque era, but a one-handed zuffolo with three front finger holes and one thumb hole is described by Michael Praetorius in his Syntagma Musicum, where it is called gar kleine[s] Plockfloetlein (a very small little recorder). Praetorius says it is about three to four Brunswick inches long. Praetorius's descriptive expression is the source of the name given by modern makers to their recorders in C_{6}. Correctly describing Praetorius's gar klein Flötlein as der höchsten Schnabelflötenart mit nur vier Grifflöchern (the highest type of fipple flute, with only four finger holes), Curt Sachs equated this instrument with the flauto alla vigesima seconda specified by Claudio Monteverdi in the 1607 score of his opera L'Orfeo. Because Praetorius gives the sounding pitch of the instrument's lowest note as C_{6} in Plate IX of the supplement to Syntagma Musicum 2, Sachs associated the name with gar klein as used by organ builders to refer to the so-called "one-foot" or "third-octave" register. Today, Monteverdi's instrument is generally assumed to be the sopranino in G_{5}, the smallest true recorder described by Praetorius, which he calls exilent (topmost) in Latin and klein flöttlein (small little flute) in German. Adding to the confusion, however, he also uses the expression klein flöttlein for the one-handed zuffolo.)

The earliest-known example of a true recorder in C_{6} is an ivory instrument by a Nuremberg maker identified by the mark "M", dating from about 1670.

In comparison to larger recorders, the fingering is relatively difficult because of the very tight hole spacing.

Frans von Twaalfhoven produced an even smaller piccolino recorder in F. The experimental piccolino plays a fourth higher than the garklein. Designed as jewellery (brooch and necklet pendant), there is an even smaller recorder, available from the Mollenhauer company in castello boxwood, rosewood, tulipwood, or grenadilla, that is actually playable.
