= Contrabass recorder =

Wind instrument

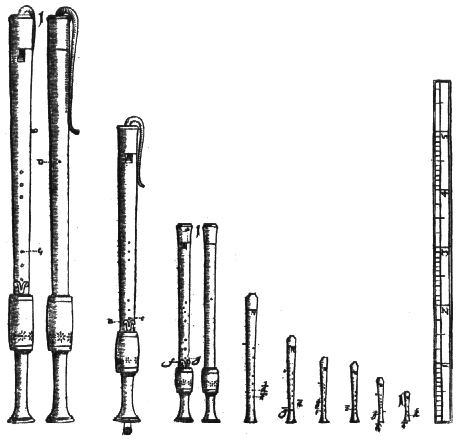
Recorders from Michael Praetorius's Syntagma Musicum (1619), with front and back views of the contrabass ("great bass") recorder at the left

The contrabass recorder is a wind instrument in F_{2} that belongs to the family of recorders.

The contrabass recorder plays an octave lower than the ordinary bass (or "basset") recorder. Until recently, it was the largest instrument in the recorder family, but since 1975 has been exceeded by the sub-great bass recorder (also called "contra-great bass" or simply "contrabass" recorder) in C_{2} and the sub-contrabass recorder in F_{1}.

Due to the length of the instrument, the lowest tone, F, requires a key. On modern instruments, keys may also be provided for low F♯, G, and G♯, and sometimes for C and C♯ as well.

Occasionally, this size of instrument may be equipped with so-called "diapason" keys, which extend its range downward by a perfect fourth to low C_{2}.

In the early 17th century, Michael Praetorius used the diminutive term "basset" (small bass) to describe the recorder that served as the lowest member of the "four-foot" consort, in which the instruments sound an octave higher than the corresponding human voices. Praetorius calls the next-lower instrument (bottom note B♭_{2}) a "bass", and the instrument an octave lower than the basset (with bottom note F_{2}) a Großbaß, "great" or "large bass".

Because Praetorius's term "great bass" today is often applied to the next-smaller size of instrument in C_{3}, the low-F bass is often designated "contrabass" by modern writers and instrument makers in a (largely futile) attempt to avoid confusion. However, the name "contrabass" is sometimes used for the next-larger size (in C_{2}), instead. The modern notation for this instrument is usually in the bass clef at sounding pitch, unlike most other sizes of recorders which are notated an octave lower than they sound.

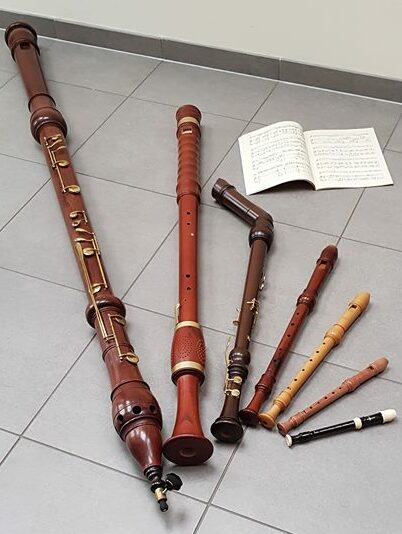
Family of neo-baroque recorders, contrabass at left

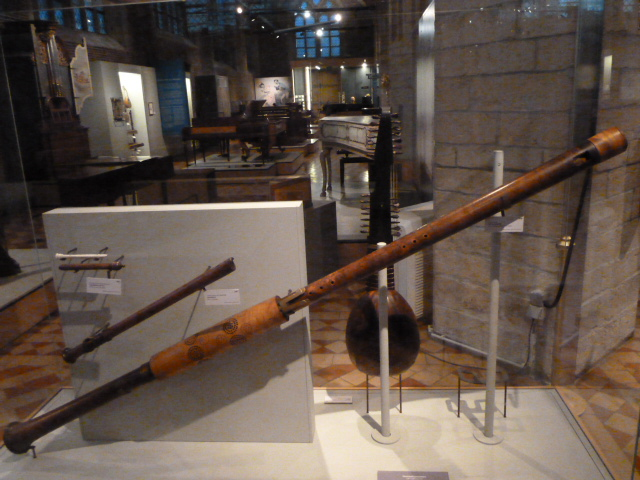
The only surviving medieval contrabass recorder, 250 centimetres (8.2 ft) long. Vleeshuis Museum, Antwerp.
