= Karel van Steenhoven =

Dutch recorder player and composer (born 1958)

- Born: November 1958 (age 67–68); Voorburg, Netherlands
- Genres: Early music, Baroque music
- Occupation: Composer
- Instrument: Recorder
- Member of: Amsterdam Loeki Stardust Quartet

Karel van Steenhoven (born November 1958 in Voorburg) is a Dutch recorder player and composer.

== Biography ==
Starting with a green plastic instrument when he was four years old, Steenhoven began to study recorder with a guitar and mandolin teacher. Later, he studied recorder with Kees Boeke at the Sweelinck Conservatory in Amsterdam. After completing his graduate recital in 1983, he studied composition with Robert Heppener and Tristan Keuris.

== Career ==
He was a founding member of the Amsterdam Loeki Stardust Quartet in 1978, along with Daniël Brüggen, Bertho Driever and Paul Leenhouts. Steenhoven has also worked with the Musica Antiqua Köln, The Academy of Ancient Music, the Cologne Chamber Orchestra and the Leipzig Gewandhaus Orchestra.

Steenhoven was appointed professor of recorder at the Hochschule für Musik Karlsruhe in 1995, Visiting International Professor at the Guildhall School in 2013, and a visiting professor at other schools. He was a jury member at the International Moeck Recorder Competition in 1997, the American Recorder Society Composition Contest in 2006, and the European Recorder Teachers' Association (ERTA) Composition Competition in 2011.

He is currently working with Mollenhauer and Adriana Breukink on the development of recorders with new fingering systems and lives in Karlsruhe, Germany.

== Sources ==
- Guildhall School of Music & Drama accessed March 15, 2015.
- Schott Hochschule für Musik Karlsruhe accessed May 17, 2015.
- Schott Music accessed May 17, 2015.
