= On Reflection =

Song by Gentle Giant

from the album Free Hand
- Released: July 1975
- Recorded: April 1975
- Genre: Progressive rock
- Length: 5:43
- Label: Chrysalis (UK)
- Songwriters: Kerry Minnear, Derek Shulman, Ray Shulman
- Producer: Gentle Giant

Official audio
- "On Reflection" on YouTube

"On Reflection" is a song by the progressive rock band Gentle Giant. It was released on their 1975 album Free Hand.

== Composition ==
"On Reflection" is in the key of B-flat major. It features a four_{or five} part Polyphony of voices.

Bruce Eder of AllMusic wrote that the song had "medieval-style a cappella vocals", while The Great Rock Bible described the song as a "folk rocker".

== Reception ==
Robert Taylor of AllMusic wrote that "On Reflection" was revolutionary for its time, due to the band's vocal approach. Taylor also wrote that the song was one of prog-rock's defining moments.

uDiscoverMusic also commented on the song positively, writing that the song's opening four-part fugue remains one of Gentle Giant's and the progressive rock genre's defining moments.

Paul Stump in the 2005 book Acquiring the Taste wrote that the song was an example of the band's "mastery of writing and performing intensely complex contrapuntal music", and that it was an instant hit when they performed live.

== Other appearances ==
A live performance of the song (recorded in 1976) is also included on the 1977 album Playing the Fool.

In July 2026, an orchestral version of the song was included in a BBC Proms concert at the Royal Albert Hall. Arranged by Sam Gale, it was performed by the BBC Concert Orchestra as part of the Proms' Prog Rock: A Fanfare for the Common Man night.

== Personnel ==
- Gary Green – electric guitar, soprano recorder, co-lead vocals
- Kerry Minnear – piano, Hammond organ, Minimoog, harpsichord, celesta, glockenspiel, vibraphone, marimba, timpani, harp, cello, lead vocals
- Derek Shulman – lead vocals
- Ray Shulman – bass guitar, violin, co-lead vocals
- John Weathers – drums, bass drum, snare drum, triangle, cymbal, percussion
