= Daniël Brüggen =

- Born: 5 April 1958 (age 66); Haarlem
- Genres: Early music, Baroque music
- Instrument: Recorder

Daniël Brüggen (born 1958) is a Dutch recorder player.

He is the nephew of Frans Brüggen and studied with Kees Boeke at the Sweelinck Conservatory in Amsterdam. In 1978 he founded, together with Bertho Driever, Paul Leenhouts, and Karel van Steenhoven, the Amsterdam Loeki Stardust Quartet, which was disbanded in 2007. He teaches at the Royal Conservatory of The Hague and the Royal Academy of Music.

He lives in Bussum, Netherlands.
