= Paul Leenhouts =

- Born: 1957 (age 67–68)
- Genres: Early music, Baroque music
- Instrument: Recorder

Paul Leenhouts is a Dutch recorder player, composer and conductor.

Leenhouts studied music at the Sweelinck Conservatory in Amsterdam. Together with Daniël Brüggen, Bertho Driever, and Karel van Steenhoven, he founded the Amsterdam Loeki Stardust Quartet in 1978. He is a composer and arranger of several works for recorder. In 1986 he started the Holland Open Recorder Festival in Utrecht, and has been director of the International Baroque Institute in Boston. He has taught recorder at the Sweelinck Conservatory, is the Director of Early Music Studies at the University of North Texas, and holds master classes in different countries. His interest in music of the Renaissance led him to collaborate with different ensembles recorders, including being the founder and artistic director of The Royal Wind Music from 1997 to 2010.

Working with Walter van Hauwe, he developed the "Catalogue for Contemporary blockflute Music".
