= Jacob Denner =

German woodwind instrument maker (1681–1735)

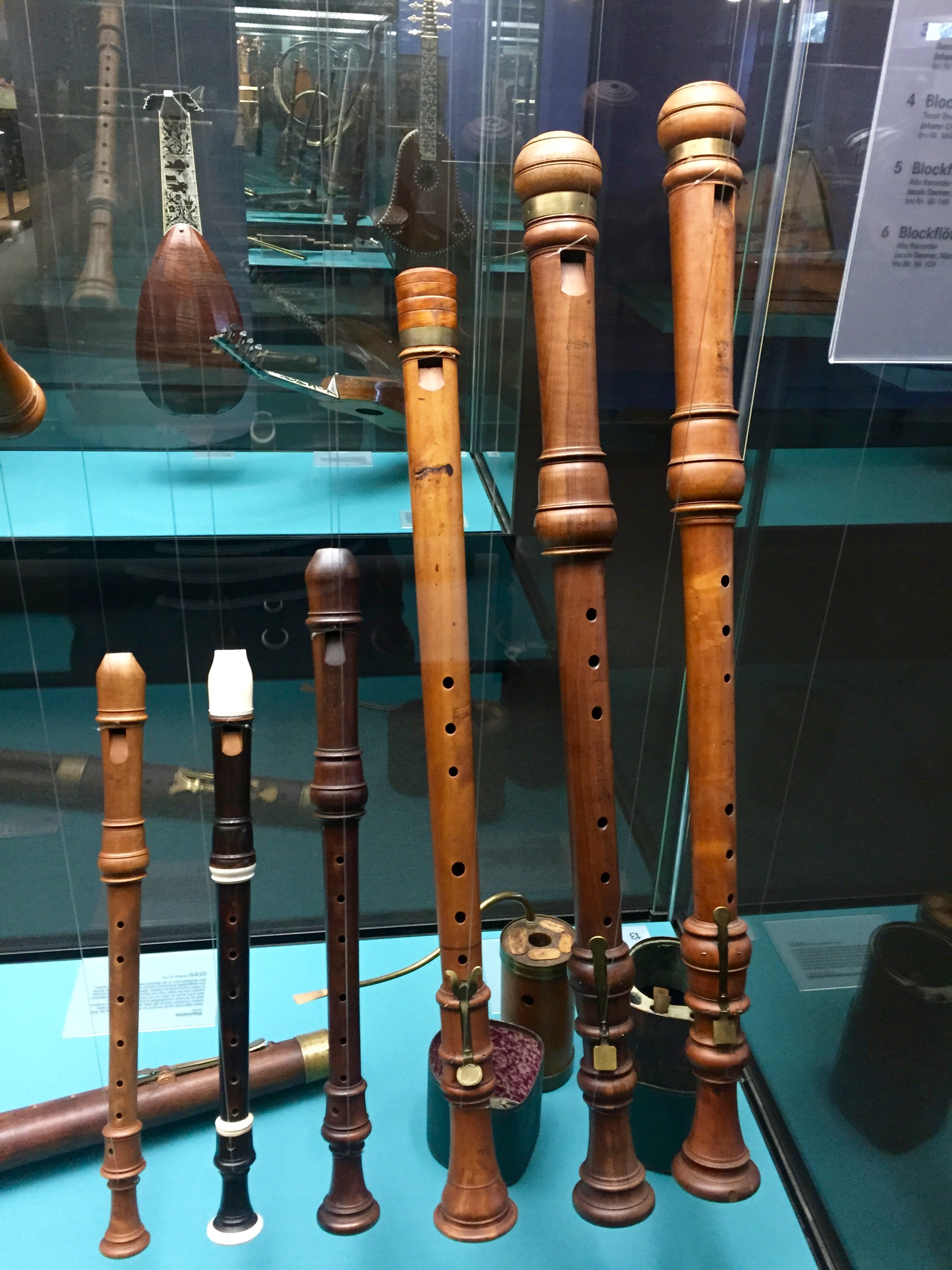
Early 18th century recorders made by Jacob and Johann Christoph Denner: (left to right) two altos in F, a "voice flute" (tenor in D), a bass in G, and two bass in F. Exhibit at the Germanisches Nationalmuseum, Nuremberg.

Jacob Denner (1681 – 1735) was a woodwind instrument maker of Nuremberg.

He was the son of Johann Christoph Denner, improver of the chalumeau and credited with the invention of the clarinet. Jacob is also well known for his recorders which have become the model for many modern instruments. He is reported to have worked for the Medici court in Florence in 1708.

Jacob was also a performer and member of the Nuremberg Stadtpfeiferei (town pipers).
