= Walter van Hauwe =

Dutch recorder player (born 1948)

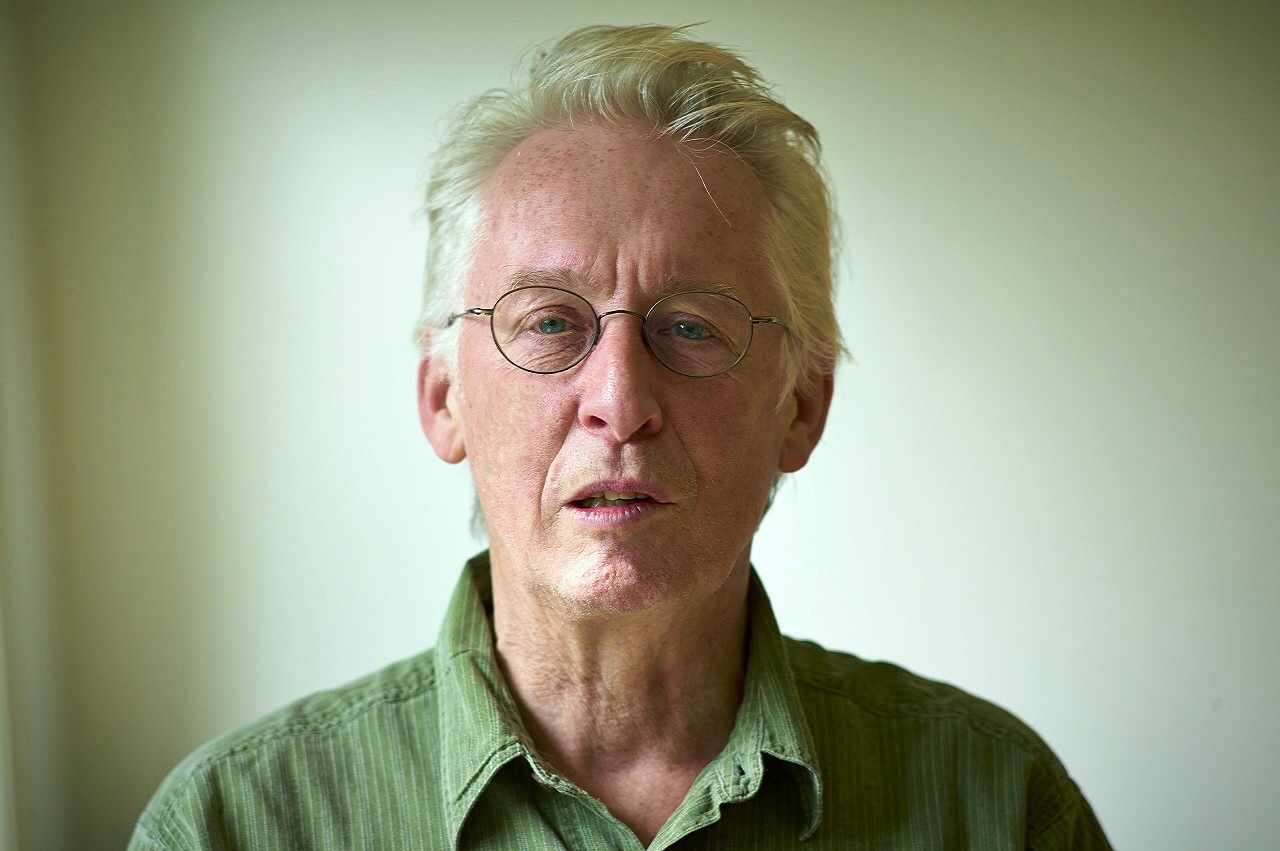

Background information
- Born: 16 November 1948 (age 77); Delft
- Genres: Early music, Contemporary music, Education
- Instrument: Recorder

Walter van Hauwe (born 16 November 1948) is a Dutch recorder player.

== Biography and career ==
After lessons at the music school of Delft – where his father was Pierre van Hauwe was the director – van Hauwe studied recorder with Frans Brüggen at the Royal Conservatory of The Hague. Working with Kees Boeke he developed a controversial education system called the BLOK (block) system. He has been a professor of recorder at the Sweelinck Conservatory since 1971, and also teaches historical performance at the Royal College of Music in London.

In 2002 he received the Dutch Prins Bernard Music Award.

van Hauwe has performed or worked with Quadro Hotteterre, Little Consort, Sour Cream, Maarten Altena Ensemble and the marimba player Keiko Abe. He has recorded for Telefunken, Vanguard, Columbia-Denon, RCA, CBS, Attacca and Channel Classics/Moeck.

He is the author of The Modern Recorder Player (3 volumes), published by Schott, translated in several languages.
