= Kunath =

- Industry: Recorder making
- Headquarters: Fulda, Germany

Kunath is a recorder maker in Fulda, Germany.

Joachim Kunath, who formerly worked for Mollenhauer, offers several lines of school recorders and reed instruments as well as the Paetzold by Kunath square recorders. Around 1975, Herbert Paetzold began to offer a square contrabass recorder made out of plywood that had been invented by his uncle Joachim Paetzold. In 1977 Frans Brüggen ordered three of these instruments for his trio Sour Cream, and they soon became popular among performers for their strength in low consorts. The line has expanded to include great bass, basset and subcontrabass instruments. Herbert Paetzold merged his workshop with Kunath in 2011.
