= Great bass recorder =

Recorder larger than the bass recorder

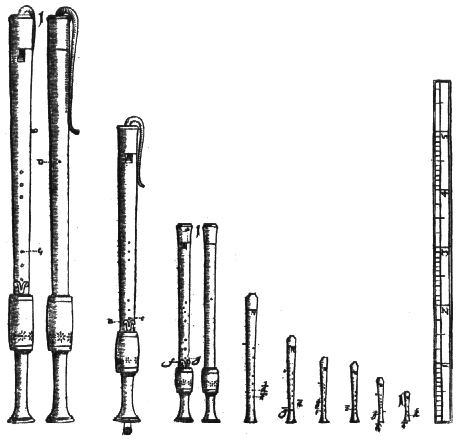
Recorders from Michael Praetorius's Syntagma Musicum (1619): great bass in F (contrabass, two views) at the left, quint bass (great bass) in B♭, bass (basset, two views), etc.

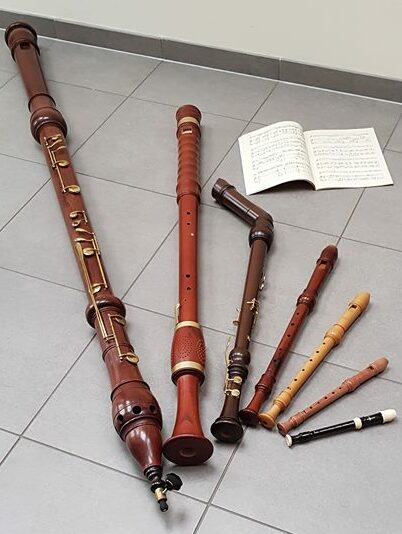
Baroque recorders. From left to right: contrabass, great bass, basset, tenor, alto, soprano, sopranino

The great bass recorder is a member of the recorder family. With the revival of the recorder by Arnold Dolmetsch, who chose Baroque music and the corresponding recorder types as a fixed point, consideration was given to the design of recorder types larger than the bass recorder. The great bass recorder has up to seven keys, which serve to facilitate access to the finger holes. For modern large bass recorders woods like maple or African Bubinga are used. The term usually applies to an instrument with range is c–d2 (g2), but has also been used to describe an instrument descending to B♭ or else to the low bass recorder in F, alternatively known as a contrabass. When "great bass" is used for the instrument in low F, the instruments in C and B♭ are referred to as "quart-bass" and "quint-bass", respectively, because they are a fourth and fifth below the ordinary small bass, or "basset". The prefixes "great" and "contra" refer to the registers from C to B and from ͵C to ͵B, respectively, in Helmholtz pitch notation.

== History ==
In the Germanisches Nationalmuseum in Nuremberg are two famous great bass recorders. Both are of the Renaissance type, despite the fact that the instrument of Hieronymus F. Kynseker (1636–1686) is provided on the head piece with high baroque ornaments. This recorder is part of an ensemble set that is made of plum wood. For larger recorders pear wood is usually used, for reasons of cost.

The great bass recorder requires a key for the bottom note, which was protected by a so-called fontanelle. An S-shaped bocal or crook is used to make it somewhat more comfortable to play the instrument.

Because the finger holes are not covered with keys, some of the tone holes are placed in acoustically unfavorable locations to accommodate the hand. The relatively large finger-span distance reduces fluency of playing.

As an authentic instrument, the great bass recorder has a short history of about 100 to 120 years. The instrument is only described in the Syntagma Musicum of Michael Praetorius (1619) and Marin Mersenne (L'Harmonie Universelle, Paris 1637). The earliest great bass recorder is probably that in the collection of Venetian Catajo Palace. It is now in the Kunsthistorisches Museum in Vienna. The great bass recorder is given the name "BassFlöt" (bass recorder) by Michael Praetorius, and described by him as an instrument in B♭, a perfect fifth lower than the basset, or "small" bass in F.

Marin Mersenne describes a great bass recorder with a very delicate carved double key for the lowest tone and the overlying semitone. The problem of the minor second above the bass tone, which can be achieved only by half-holing and which not every recorder player can get used to, is not solved by Mersenne's innovation by analogy to other instruments.

The Kynseker instrument from the Germanisches Nationalmuseum is both the highpoint and the endpoint of development. It lags behind Mersenne's ideas. It is possible that it was already conceived as historicizing.
