= Sour Cream (band) =

Sour Cream was a Dutch recorder trio.

The group was formed by Frans Brüggen in 1972 and consisted of Brüggen, Kees Boeke and Walter van Hauwe with the intent to perform avant-garde work for the recorder. They were involved in the Dutch counterculture movement, which resulted in some unusual performances:

The concluding piece of one of their Boston concerts featured a Keystone Kops-style chase around the stage. A year or two later, with the ensemble playing Telemann trios again in Boston, Brüggen wandered on to the stage, donned a pair of dark sunglasses, stretched himself out on a chaise longue and proceeded to read the newspaper.

== Discography ==
- Henry VIII & La Musica Speculativa LP 1980 (reissued DHM)
- The Passion of Reason made as a reunion in June 1993 (reissued Glossa 2016).
