= Frans Brüggen =

Dutch conductor, recorder player and baroque flautist (1934–2014)

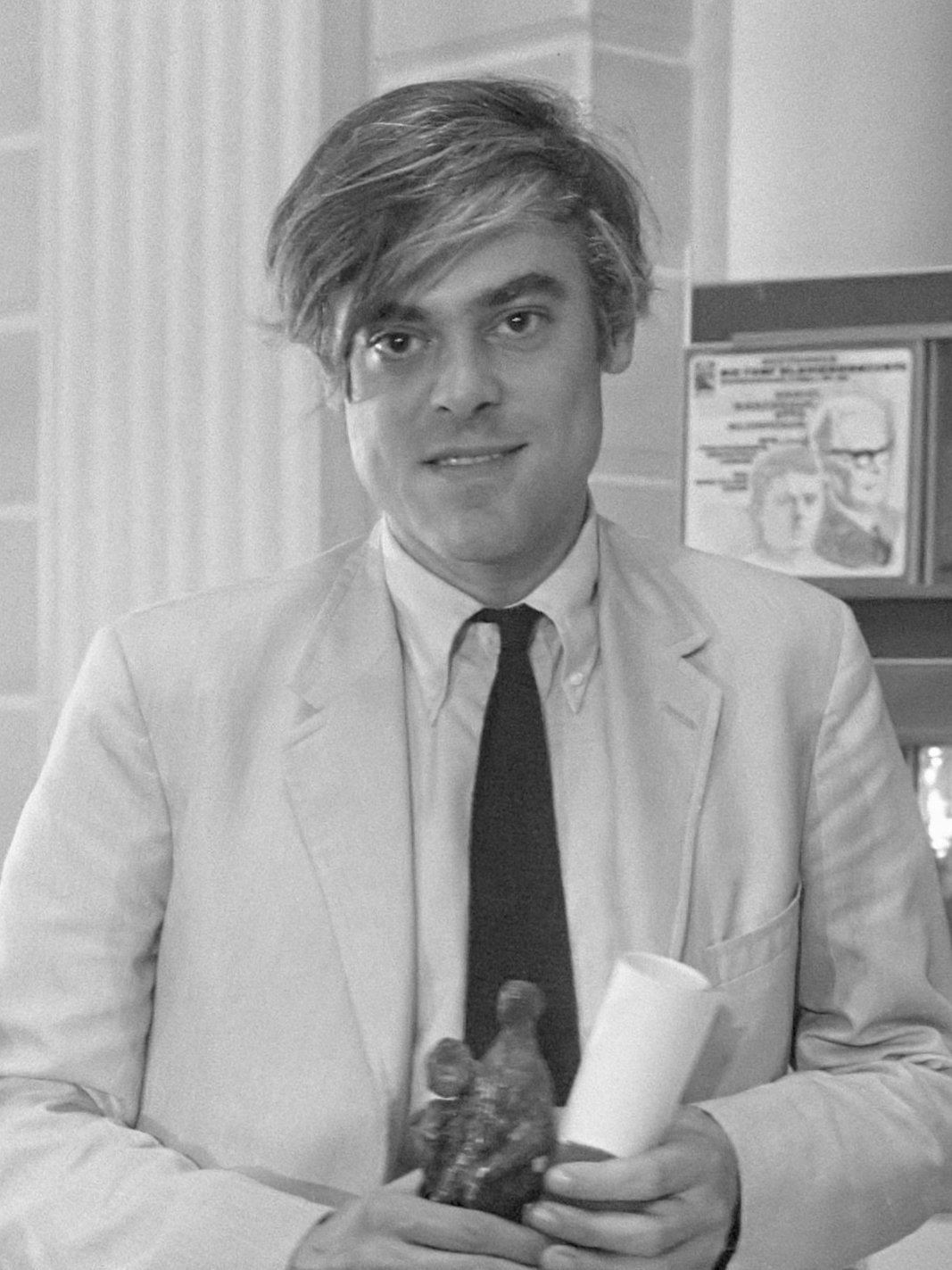
- Brüggen in 1969
- Born: 30 October 1934; Amsterdam, Netherlands
- Died: 13 August 2014 (aged 79)
- Education: University of Amsterdam
- Occupations: Recorder player; Flutist; Conductor
- Organizations: Royal Conservatory of The Hague

Franciscus ("Frans") Jozef Brüggen (30 October 1934 – 13 August 2014) was a Dutch conductor, recorder player and baroque flautist.

== Biography ==
Born in Amsterdam, Brüggen was the youngest of the nine children of August Brüggen, a textile factory owner, and his wife Johanna (née Verkley), an amateur singer. He studied recorder and flute at the Amsterdam Muzieklyceum. He also studied musicology at the University of Amsterdam. In 1955, at the age of 21, he was appointed professor at the Royal Conservatory of The Hague. His reputation was initially as a recorder and Baroque flute virtuoso, and he commissioned several works for recorder including Luciano Berio's Gesti (1965). In 1972, he co-founded recorder ensemble Sour Cream with Kees Boeke and Walter van Hauwe.

Brüggen introduced a flexibility of tone and rhythm to solo recorder playing that was novel to historically informed performance practice at the time. Notes in slow passages would be slightly bent for emotional affect, tone warmed and cooled, messa di voce employed, alongside considerable use of rubato. Such approaches provoked some controversy at the time, but in part due to his use of them, have since become more commonplace.

In 1981, Brüggen co-founded with Sieuwert Verster the Orchestra of the Eighteenth Century (Orkest van de Achttiende Eeuw). Although he did not have a formal title with the orchestra, he was its de facto chief conductor until his death. The Orchestra of the Age of Enlightenment (OAE) named Brüggen its co-principal guest conductor, in parallel with Simon Rattle, in 1992. The OAE later gave him the title of Emeritus Conductor in 2007. He was the conductor of the Radio Kamerorkest in the Netherlands from 1991 to 1994, and joint chief conductor of the orchestra, alongside Péter Eötvös, from 2001 until the dissolution of the orchestra in 2005. Brüggen conducted the final concert of the successor to the Radio Kamerorkest, the Netherlands Radio Chamber Orchestra, on 14 July 2013.

Brüggen was a visiting professor at Harvard University and the University of California, Berkeley.

His recordings include, as a flautist, selections from the Pièces de Clavecin en Concerts of Jean-Philippe Rameau, and as a conductor, Instrumental Suites of Rameau's operas (Dardanus, Les Boréales, Castor & Pollux, Les Indes galantes, Naïs, Zoroastre, Les Fêtes d'Hébé, Acante et Céphise), symphonies of Ludwig van Beethoven, Joseph Haydn, Wolfgang Amadeus Mozart and Franz Schubert.

== Personal life ==
Brüggen was married twice. His first marriage to Ineke Verwayen produced two daughters, Laura and Alicia. His second marriage was to the art historian Machtelt Israëls; they had two daughters, Zephyr and Eos. Brüggen was the uncle of recorder soloist and Amsterdam Loeki Stardust Quartet member, Daniël Brüggen.

== Honours and awards ==
- The Honorary medal for Arts and Science of the Order of the House of Orange (22 September 2010)
- Knight of the Order of the Netherlands Lion (28 April 2003)
