= Syntagma =

Syntagma (σύνταγμα), a Greek word meaning "arrangement" in classical Greek and "constitution" in modern Greek, may refer to:

- The Constitution of Greece
- Ottoman Empire Constitution of 1876
- Syntagma Square in Athens
- Syntagma station of the Athens Metro
- A military unit of 256 men in the Ancient Macedonian army
- Syntagma (linguistics), a linguistic term related to syntagmatic structure
- a genetically encoded sensor to tag active synapses
- In biology, especially in dated works: synonymous with Tagma (biology) or an assembly of tagmata.

== Books ==
- Syntagma, a lost work of Hippolytus
- a 5th-century work by Gelasius of Cyzicus, ecclesiastical writer
- a 6th-century work by Athanasios of Emesa, Byzantine jurist
- a 9th-century medical work by Theodosius Romanus, Syriac Orthodox patriarch of Antioch
- a 12th-century religious work by Theodore Balsamon, Greek Orthodox patriarch of Antioch
- a 14th-century religious work by Matthew Blastares, Byzantine writer
- Syntagma Canonum, a 14th-century law compendium
- Syntagma Musicum, a 17th-century work of organology by Michael Praetorius
- Syntagma Anatomicum, a 17th-century text book for medical students by Johann Vesling
