= Sub-great bass recorder =

Wind instrument in the recorder family

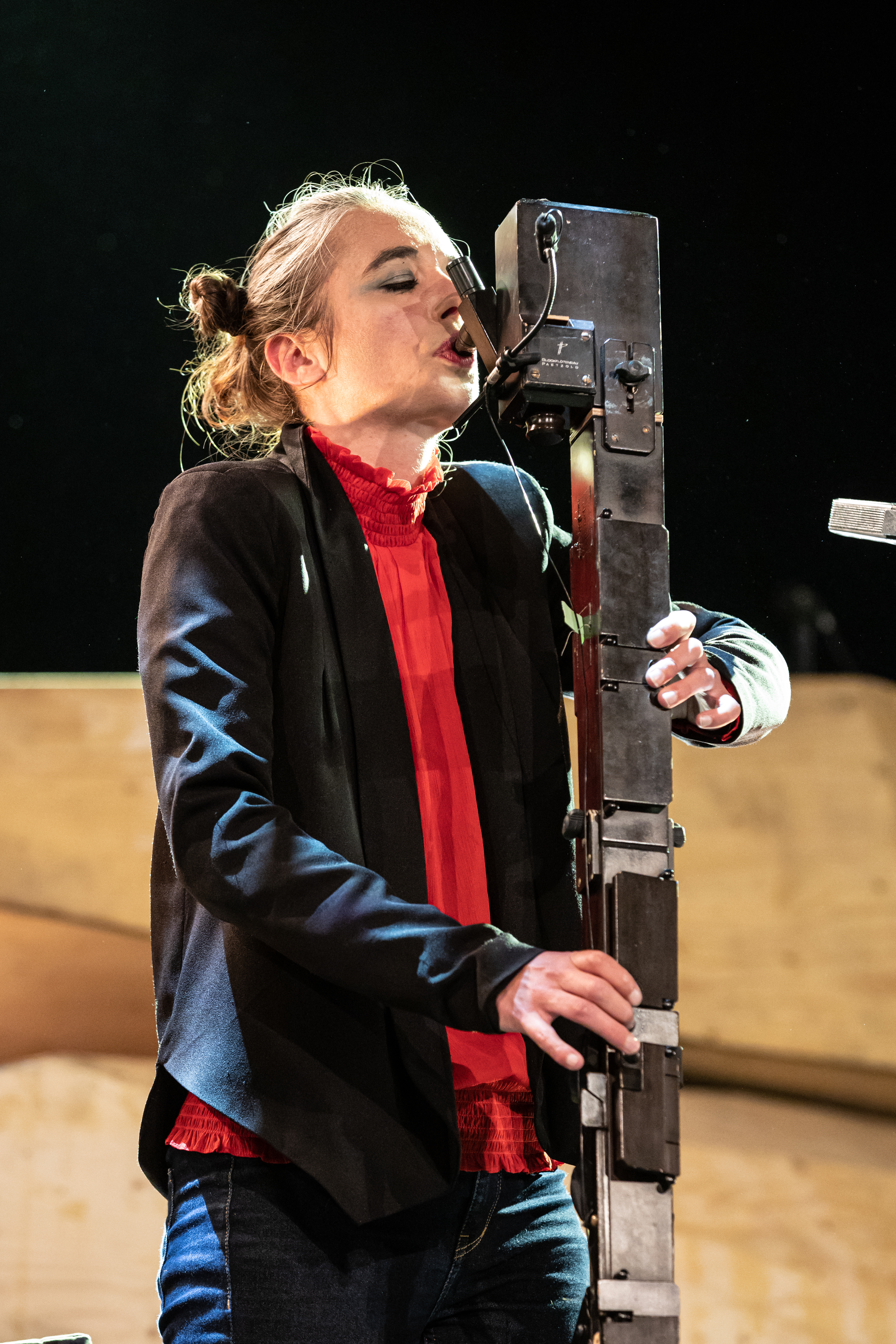

The sub-great bass recorder is a large recorder in the key of C. Larger still is the sub-sub great bass, also in the key of C. Additional large recorders include the contra bass and sub contra bass, both of which are in the key of F. They are primarily manufactured in both bent ("knick") and square designs. The design with a square or rectangular cross-sections was first patented in 1975 by Joachim and Herbert Paetzold. They are made from plywood or resin and have a doubled-back bore like a bassoon, which reduces the exterior length of the instrument. They also have wooden or resin keys. Through this special and proprietary design, the instrument can be played with a very short bocal.

The American recorder player Michael Barker has combined a Paetzold contrabass recorder with two computer-controlled synthesizers to create what he calls a "midified blockflute".

The sub-great bass recorder was developed by Herbert Paetzold in Ebenhofen. Today, this recorder size is produced and distributed by the workshop Kunath under the brand name "Paetzold by Kunath".
