= Leadpipe =

Part of a brass instrument that receives the mouthpiece

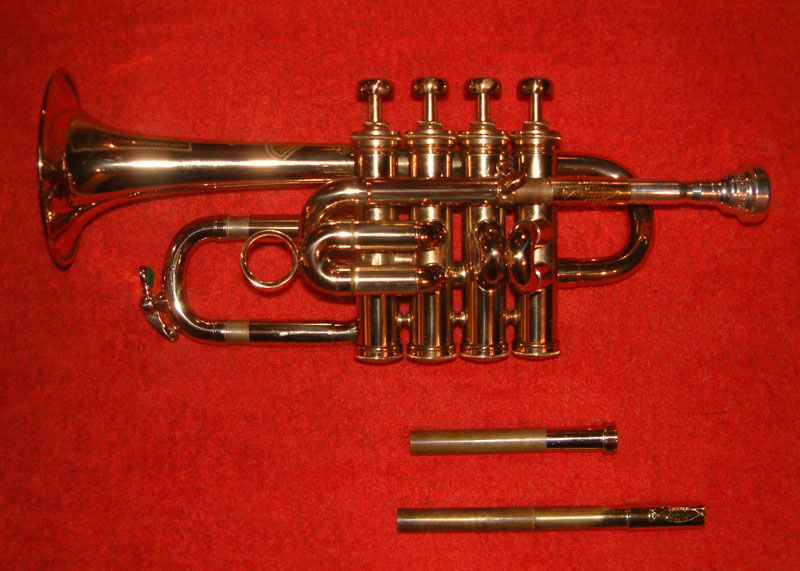
Piccolo trumpet in B♭, with swappable leadpipes to tune the instrument to B♭ (shorter) or A (longer).

Basic trombone anatomy
1. tuning slide 2. counterweight 3. mouthpiece 4. slide lock ring 5. bell 6. knob/bumper 7. water key/spit valve 8. main slide 9. second slide brace/stay 10. first slide brace/stay 11. bell lock nut

Scheme of a French horn (view from underneath). #2: Leadpipe.

In a brass instrument, a leadpipe or mouthpipe is the pipe or tube into which the mouthpiece is placed.

For example, on the illustration of a trombone, the leadpipe would be between #3 and #4, the mouthpiece and the slide lock ring. In the illustration of a French horn, the leadpipe is #2.

== Detachable leadpipes ==
Most leadpipes are permanently fixed in the instrument, though aftermarket changes, usually carried out by a repairer, are quite common. Some instruments have a detachable leadpipe to allow changing key; to permit the player to easily select different playing and tonal characteristics; or simply to act as the instrument's main tuning slide where the shape, or other design issues, make this the best place for it. The use of the leadpipe as the main tuning slide is particularly common in flugelhorns and piccolo trumpets though not unknown in other instruments. For example, in the Selmer piccolo trumpet in the photograph, the leadpipes are used for all three functions: the aftermarket Blackburn pipes shown have different playing characteristics from those of the stock Selmer pipe; the choice of leadpipe determines whether the instrument is in A or B♭; it is also the main tuning slide.

== See also ==
- Bocal
- Venturi effect
