= Soprano (disambiguation) =

Soprano is the highest female singing voice or the highest voice part in a singing group.

Soprano(s) may also refer to:

== People ==
- Soprano (rapper) (b. 1979), stage name of French rapper Saïd M'Roumbaba

== Arts, entertainment, and media ==
- The Sopranos (1998 novel), by Scottish writer Alan Warner
- The Sopranos, an American crime-drama television series
  - "The Sopranos" (The Sopranos episode), the 1999 pilot episode of The Sopranos

== Musical instruments ==
- Soprano clarinet
- Soprano recorder
- Soprano saxophone

== Other uses ==
- Soprano, a software library in KDE
