= Bertho Driever =

- Born: 1953; Wageningen
- Genres: Early music, Baroque music
- Instrument: Recorder
- Formerly of: Amsterdam Loeki Stardust Quartet

Bertho Driever (born 1953) is a recorder player.

He studied physics at the Utrecht University and music at the Sweelinck Conservatory in Amsterdam. In 1978, together with Daniël Brüggen, Paul Leenhouts, and Karel van Steenhoven, he founded the Amsterdam Loeki Stardust Quartet . He currently teaches at Boswell-Bèta and worked at Radboud University Nijmegen.
