= Sopranino =

Sopranino indicates a tonal range higher than soprano, and can refer to:

== Music ==
- Sopranino clarinet or E-flat clarinet
- Sopranino recorder
- Sopranino saxophone
- Sopranino voice, with a range higher than soprano

== Other ==
- Sopranino, a 1950 ultralight sailboat, the pattern for later classes, now preserved at the Classic Boat Museum at Cowes, Isle of Wight

== See also ==
- Soprano (disambiguation)
