= Free Hand =

Studio album by Gentle Giant
- Released: August 1975
- Recorded: April 1975
- Studios: Advision, London
- Genre: Progressive rock
- Length: 36:50
- Labels: Chrysalis (UK); Capitol (US)
- Producer: Gentle Giant

Gentle Giant chronology
The Power and the Glory (1974)	Free Hand (1975)	Interview (1976)

"On Reflection"
- sample of the song: file; help

Free Hand is the seventh studio album by British progressive rock band Gentle Giant, released in 1975. It was Gentle Giant's first album with Chrysalis Records in the UK and internationally, except for the USA and Canada where it was released by Capitol Records. It is noted for having a less dissonant and more commercial sound than the previous album The Power and the Glory. It was their highest-charting album in the US, reaching number 48 on the Billboard 200.

== Releases ==
In addition to the usual stereo version, the album was also mixed in 4-channel quadraphonic sound in 1976. The 4-channel mix was not used until 2012 when it finally appeared on DVD with encoding in multichannel LPCM, DTS and Dolby Digital surround sound formats.

A 1990 CD re-issue in the US by One Way Records used an alternate stereo mix. This version revealed some different details in the musical and vocal parts. However, this edition may have actually been a reduction or variation of the 4-channel mix.

Alucard Music/EMI Records re-released the CD in 2009, "from the original 1/4-inch tapes through 24bit 96k Hi-Resolution transfer."

On 25 June 2021 a new remix by musician and producer Steven Wilson was released in Dolby Atmos & 5.1 surround sound, accompanied by custom animated visuals for each track on Blu-ray. In addition, a flat transfer of the original mix, the 1976 quad mix and an instrumental mix were all included in a digipack CD. A double vinyl album was also released with both the same transfer of the original mix and Steven Wilson remixed versions.

Two versions of the album cover were issued with the hand in slightly different positions. UK copies show the thumb curved, while US copies have a straight thumb.

== Reception ==
Professional ratings
Review scores
Source	Rating
AllMusic	4.5/5 stars
Sea of Tranquility	4.5/5 stars
Music Week	(fair)

The Great Rock Bible described the album:

Duly signing a new deal in Britain with Chrysalis Records, their seventh album Free Hand (1975), again only found a paying audience (and Top 50 status) across the water. However, it did contain impressive vocal gymnastics, much in evidence on jewels in the crown, "Just The Same" and the renaissance/retro, part a cappella/part folk-rocker "On Reflection"; the latter combining four pieces of group scribed fugue. Minnear's un-medieval meanderings on the ivories for the pure-prog title track was just the ticket for a group still going strong despite others such as ELP and the aforementioned Genesis and King Crimson were collapsing under rock's evolution. Although at times exquisitely off-kilter, tracks such as "Time to Kill", the beautiful "His Last Voyage", the folkie "Mobile" and Tudor-esque instrumental ditty "Talybont", gave the set an aura of accessibility – a classic!

In turn, Music Week assessed:

One of the more unusual albums to be released this static summer, Free Hand lives up to the promise in the accompanying blurb of being "a melting pot of styles". The ingredients here arc, as in previous [Gentle] Giant offerings a mix of jazz, classical, folk, round-singing and rock. There are seven long tracks, some tuneful beaty numbers, and others broken up into songlets of different styles which manage to be different without being computerised.

== Track listing ==
All tracks are written by Kerry Minnear, Derek Shulman, and Ray Shulman.

Side one
No.	Title	Length
1.	"Just the Same"	5:33
2.	"On Reflection"	5:43
3.	"Free Hand"	6:14

Side two
No.	Title	Length
4.	"Time to Kill"	5:08
5.	"His Last Voyage"	6:26
6.	"Talybont"	2:43
7.	"Mobile"	5:03

Bonus Track
No.	Title	Length
8.	"Just the Same" (Live; on the 35th anniversary CD edition)	4:50

6 extra tracks added on 'I Lost My Head – The Chrysalis Years 1975–1980' LP
No.	Title	Length
8.	"1976 Intro Tape" (previously unreleased)	1:39
9.	"Just the Same" (BBC session John Peel)	6:05
10.	"Free Hand" (BBC session John Peel)	6:08
11.	"On Reflection" (BBC session John Peel)	5:42
12.	"Give It Back" (International 7" mix)	3:48
13.	"I Lost My Head" (7" mix)	3:29

== Personnel ==
Credits taken from liner notes. There are no instrument credits listed.

=== Gentle Giant ===
- Derek Shulman
- Ray Shulman
- Kerry Minnear
- Gary Green
- John Weathers

=== Technical ===
- Engineer – Gary Martin
- Assistant engineer – Paul Northfield
- Cover design – Gentle Giant
- Graphics – Richard Evans

== Charts ==
Chart (1975)	Peak position
Canada Top Albums/CDs (RPM)	49
US Billboard 200	48

Chart (2021)	Peak position
German Albums (Offizielle Top 100)	43
Scottish Albums (Official Charts)	24
UK Independent Albums (Official Charts)	20
UK Rock & Metal Albums (Official Charts)	7
