= Amsterdam Loeki Stardust Quartet =

- Origin: Amsterdam, Netherlands
- Years active: 1978 – Nov, 2007
- Members: Daniël Brüggen, Bertho Driever, Paul Leenhouts, Karel van Steenhoven
- Past members: Daniel Koschitzki, Andrea Ritter

The Amsterdam Loeki Stardust Quartet is a professional Dutch recorder quartet.

== History ==
The quartet was founded in 1978 by Daniël Brüggen, Bertho Driever, Paul Leenhouts and Karel van Steenhoven, four students of Frans Brüggen at the Sweelinck Conservatory Amsterdam. Following its formation, the ensemble's reputation grew quickly and was further strengthened at the 1981 Musica Antiqua Bruges competition where, challenging the competition rules, it performed an unusual arrangement of a Stevie Wonder song and emerged with second prize.

The long name of the group is explained in the following:

The quartet was founded in Amsterdam, hence Amsterdam and Quartet. LOEKI was the name of a little lion-puppet on Dutch television who appeared in between commercials with a short funny act. The appearance of the lion was always accompanied by a short melody, which everyone in Holland knew and could whistle. We arranged this melody for four recorders and played it as a joke in a concert. Hence Loeki. STAR was the name of the company which broadcast the commercials, hence Stardust (we liked the dust).

The Amsterdam Loeki Stardust Quartet has enjoyed an international career. They have appeared at many early music festivals including those in Berlin, Utrecht, London and Sapporo, and regularly tour throughout Europe, the USA and Japan. They also perform separate from festivals in concert halls. In 1998, 2001, 2004, 2009, Queen Beatrix of the Netherlands requested the quartet to perform for her during official festivities. Since its formation, the quartet has continually explored the boundaries of the recorder consort, playing a mix of recorder music from all ages of music, especially from the Renaissance, Baroque and twentieth-century. A number of composers have been inspired to write for the Quartet, which has helped create a new repertoire that demonstrates the recorder to be an important voice of our time.

A few years ago, both Bertho Driever and Paul Leenhouts left Loeki Stardust in order to pursue other careers in music. They were replaced by Daniel Koschitzki and Andrea Ritter. After internal struggle, it was decided to end the ensemble which led to a farewell concert in November 2007. After seeing each other in private, the four founding members of the group decided to regroup in order to celebrate their 30th anniversary in 2008, but not to make plans after that since they do not wish to re-establish an ensemble. At present, about 50 concerts are planned all over the world.

== Recorded music ==
The Amsterdam Loeki Stardust Quartet has made a wide range of recordings on CD of recorder music throughout the ages. Two of them were awarded with an Edison Award.

- The Loeki Files (2008)
- Fade Control (2007)
- Nocturne (2005)
- Fugue around the clock (2003)
- Fantazia (2001)
- Time Signals (2001)
- Die Kunst der Fuge (1998)
- Dutch Masters volume 40 (1998)
- Pictured Air (1995)
- The Image of Melancolly (1991)
- Extra Time (1991)
- Italian Recorder Music (1991)
- Baroque Recorder Music (1987)
- Virtuoso Recorder Music (1985)
- La Spagna
- Consort Songs
- Concerti di Flauti
- Capriccio di Flauti
- A Concorde of Sweete Sound
- Alte Musik im Linzer Schloß
