= Tenor recorder =

Wind instrument in the recorder family

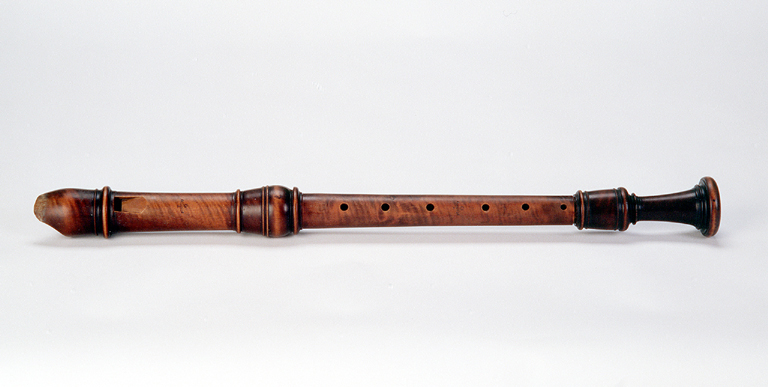
Recorder, tenor (AM 1998.60.41-1)

The tenor recorder is a member of the recorder family. It has the same form as a soprano (or descant) recorder and an alto (or treble) recorder, but it produces a lower sound than either; a still lower sound is produced by the bass recorder and great bass recorder.

The tenor recorder, like the soprano recorder, is tuned in C, but is pitched an octave lower. Because of its larger size, many tenors have keys to make it easier to play the lowest C and C♯, and occasionally D and D♯.

In modern notation, the tenor is written at sounding pitch, unlike most of the other recorder sizes, which (except sometimes the alto) are written an octave lower or higher than they sound.

== History ==
In the Baroque there was a notable lack of the tenor recorder in C, which featured in consort music of the Renaissance, and which forms an important part of the modern recorder playing movement. Instead there existed an alto recorder in D, or "Voiceflute", which was said to be the instrument closest in character to the human voice. In the 18th century, in German-speaking countries, the tenor recorder was named Quartflöte (fourth flute), after the interval it forms below the ordinary recorder (alto) in F. Confusingly, the same name was used for the soprano recorder in C, apparently because it forms the same interval above the alto in G. At the same time, the English and French equivalents, "fourth flute" and "flute du quatre", meant a recorder a fourth higher than the alto in F—that is, an instrument with B♭ as its lowest note.

== Innovations ==
More recently, the tenor recorder has become the subject of experimentation into modern "harmonic" recorders, so called because of their in-tune harmonics. Nick Tarasov and Joachim Paetzold started experimenting with "harmonic" recorders in the 1930s, with the goal to "strengthen the original characteristics of the recorder and minimize the weakness of standard models". Contemporary models such as the Helder Tenor manufactured by Mollenhauer and the Ehlert Tenor produced by Moeck are harmonic recorders as well. The tenor recorder has also been subject to other variations such as the Breukink-Slide-Recorder, and the moveable-block systems of the Helder Tenor and Strathmann-flute.

== Repertoire ==
Much of the repertoire of the Baroque traverso is commonly adapted onto the tenor recorder. Additionally the tenor recorder has been included in many contemporary ensemble works, such as Hindemith: Abendkonzert aus Plöner Musiktag for SAT ensemble, and the "Music for Recorders" as edited by Benjamin Britten, among other contemporary works.
