= Bass recorder =

Wind instrument in the recorder family

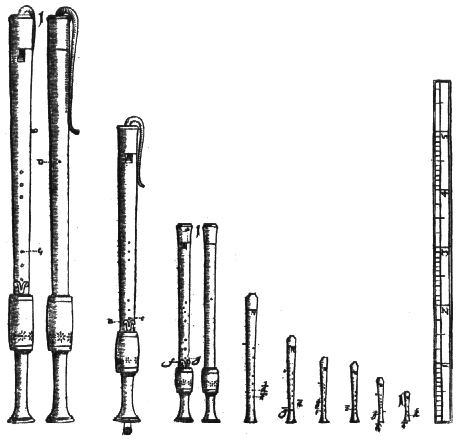
Recorders from Michael Praetorius's Syntagma Musicum (1619), the fourth and fifth from the left show front and back view of an F bass (basset)

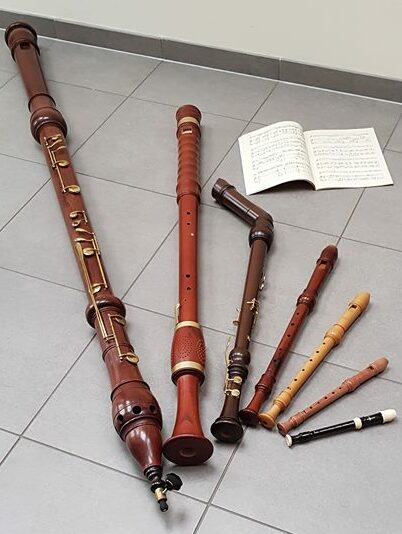
Baroque recorders. From left to right: contrabass, great bass, basset, tenor, alto, soprano, sopranino

A bass recorder is a wind instrument in F_{3} that belongs to the family of recorders.

The bass recorder plays an octave lower than the alto or treble recorder. In the recorder family it stands in between the tenor recorder and C great-bass (or quart-bass) recorder.

Due to the length of the instrument, the lowest tone, F, requires a key. On modern instruments, keys may also be provided for low F♯, G, and G♯, and sometimes for C and C♯ as well.

In the early 17th century, Michael Praetorius used the diminutive term "basset" (small bass) to describe this size of recorder as the lowest member of the "four-foot" consort, in which the instruments sound an octave higher than the corresponding human voices. Praetorius calls the next-lower instrument (bottom note B♭_{2}) a "bass", and the instrument an octave lower than the basset (with bottom note F_{2}) a Großbaß, or "large bass".

The bass is usually the lowest instrument of the recorder consort, but it may be used as an alto in "eight-foot" register in the so-called "great consort" or grand jeux, in which case two larger sizes of bass recorder take the lower parts and a tenor may be used as an optional descant.

== In popular music ==
In the recording of Led Zeppelin's song "Stairway to Heaven" that appears on their untitled fourth studio album, John Paul Jones played four overdubbed bass recorders.

Composer Ludwig Göransson employed a bass recorder for the opening melody of the TV series The Mandalorian. The melody features prominently throughout the series, as well as in the 2026 film The Mandalorian and Grogu.
