= Johann Christoph Denner =

German woodwind instrument maker

- Born: 13 August 1655; Leipzig, Germany
- Died: 26 April 1707 (aged 51)
- Occupation: Instrument maker
- Known for: Inventor of the clarinet

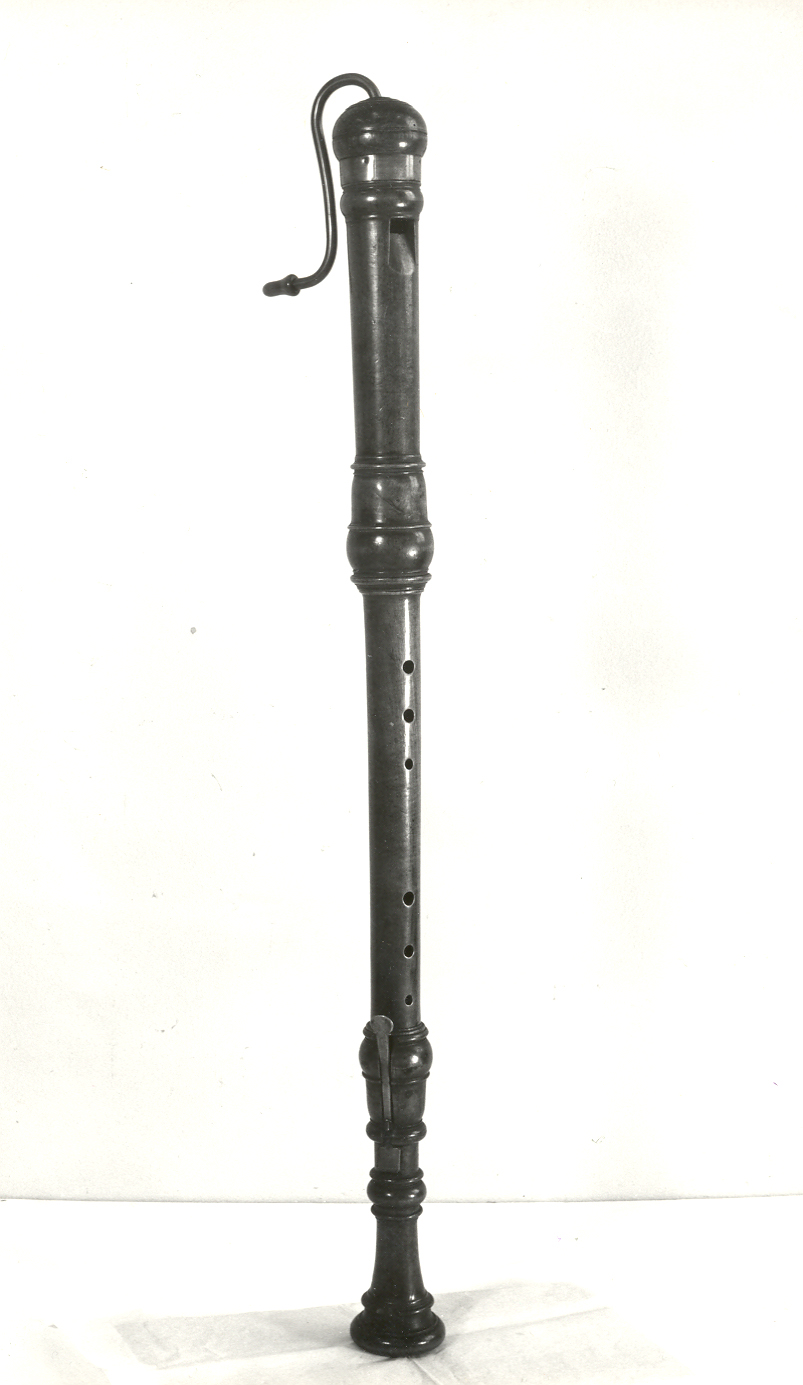
A bass (basset) recorder in F made by Johann Christoph Denner, from the Berlin Musical Instrument Museum.

Johann Christoph Denner (13 August 1655 – 26 April 1707) was a German woodwind instrument maker of the Baroque era, to whom the invention of the clarinet is attributed.

Denner was born in Leipzig to a family of horn-tuners. With his father, Heinrich Denner, a maker of game whistles and hunting horns, he moved to Nuremberg in 1666. J. C. Denner went into business as an instrument maker in 1678 and was granted rights for the “manufacture of French musical instruments consisting chiefly of oboes and recorders [flandadois]” in 1697. Two of his sons, Jacob and Johann David, also became instrument builders. At least sixty-eight instruments attributed to J. C. Denner have survived to the present day, although the surviving instruments with his name are believed to have come from his sons' workshops. Denner died in 1707 and was buried in Nuremberg.

In 1730, Johann Gabriel Doppelmayr wrote of Denner:

At the beginning of the current century, he invented a new kind of pipe-work, the so-called clarinet... and at length presented an improved chalumeau.

On the basis of this passage, Denner has been credited by many with the improvement of the chalumeau and the invention of the clarinet. Despite the words "At the beginning of the current century" he is often said to have developed the clarinet in 1690; there is no evidence for this. In fact, J. C. Denner may have built no clarinets at all. Only one extant clarinet, owned by the University of California, Berkeley has been attributed to him, and this attribution has been challenged. Another instrument possibly made by Denner was destroyed in World War II. The earliest known reference to the clarinet is an invoice from Jacob Denner dated 1710, three years after J. C. Denner's death.
