= Bocal =

Neck feature of certain woodwind instruments

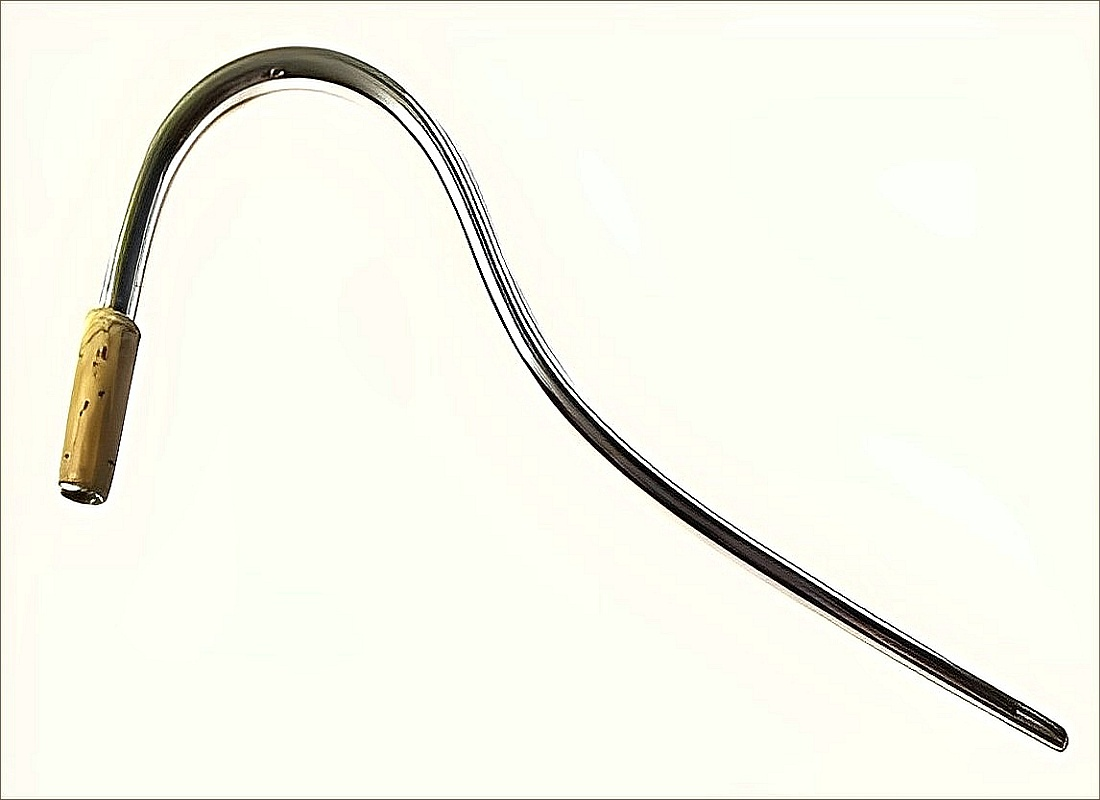
A bassoon bocal: The bocal is used by inserting the cork-end into the instrument (in this case, a bassoon); the prepared reed is then placed on the other end of the bocal.

Detail of a cor anglais, showing its bocal inserted

A bocal or crook is a curved, tapered tube, which is an integral part of certain woodwind instruments. These include double-reed instruments such as the bassoon, contrabassoon, cor anglais, and oboe d'amore, as well as the larger recorders. In the double-reed instruments, the bocal connects the reed to the rest of the instrument; in the case of larger recorders, the bocal directs air from the player's mouth to the fipple. Bocals can be made from a variety of metals, including nickel silver, brass, sterling silver, or even gold, and are covered at the lower end with a cork sleeve, allowing the it to fit tightly in the socket at the top of the instrument. More recently, at least one maker is producing bocals made of hardwood. The

reed either fits directly on to the tapered end of the bocal (as with the bassoon) or is tied to a metal tube which fits to the bocal (as with the cor anglais).

Some low-pitched single-reed instruments have crooks that connect the mouthpiece to the neck or connect the neck to the main body of the instrument. The term "crook" can also be used to describe the curve of the neck itself. Examples of low single-reed instruments with neck crooks include the tenor saxophone and bass clarinet.

== See also ==
- Leadpipe
