= Sopranino recorder =

Wind instrument in the recorder family

The sopranino recorder is the second smallest recorder of the modern recorder family, and was the smallest before the 17th century.

This modern instrument has F_{5} as its lowest note, and its length is 20 cm. It is almost always made from soft European or tropical hardwoods, though sometimes it is also made of plastic.

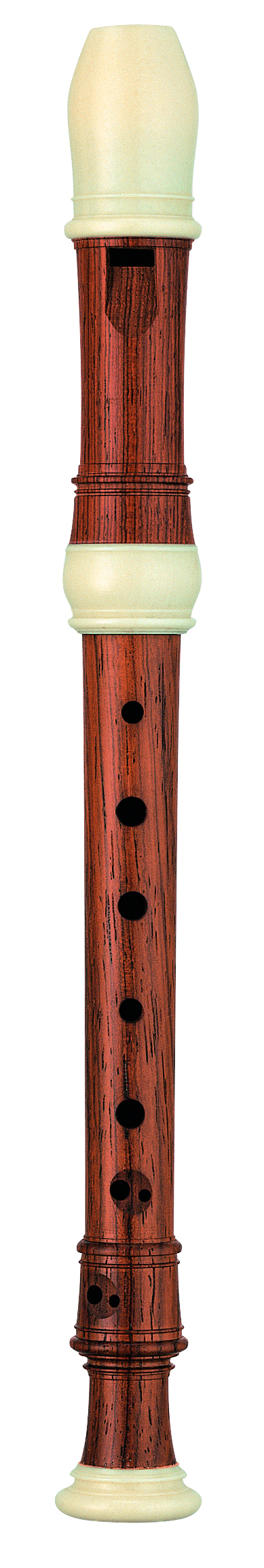
A Baroque style sopranino recorder

Historically there were several sizes of recorder in this register, named differently in different periods and in different languages. In his Syntagma Musicum (1619), Michael Praetorius describes this size of recorder, only a whole tone higher, with G_{5} as its lowest pitch. He calls it exilent (highest) in Latin, and kleine Flöte (small flute), klein Flötlein (small little flute), or gar klein (really small) in German. According to Praetorius, it is the smallest of eight sizes of recorder in a complete "Accort oder Stimmwerk" (set of all voices), and sounds a quintadecima (a fifteenth—that is, two octaves) higher than a cornett. Such a complete set includes a total of twenty-one instruments, including a pair of exilents, and two each of the two next larger sizes, Discantflöten in D_{5} and C_{5}. However, Praetorius recommends restricting recorder ensembles to the five deepest sizes, because "die kleinen gar zu starck und laut schreien"—"the small ones scream so".

The sopranino in G is most probably the instrument Claudio Monteverdi calls for in L'Orfeo (1607), by the name flautino alla vigesima seconda (little flute at the third octave).

In 18th-century England, the sizes of recorder smaller than the treble in F (which was called simply "flute") were named according to their interval above it, and often were notated as transposing instruments. The descant (or soprano) on C was called a "fifth flute", the instrument a whole tone higher still was the "sixth flute" (on D), and what is known today as sopranino was the "octave flute".
