= Alto recorder =

Wind instrument

Treble recorder made by Van Heerde, Amsterdam, c. 1720

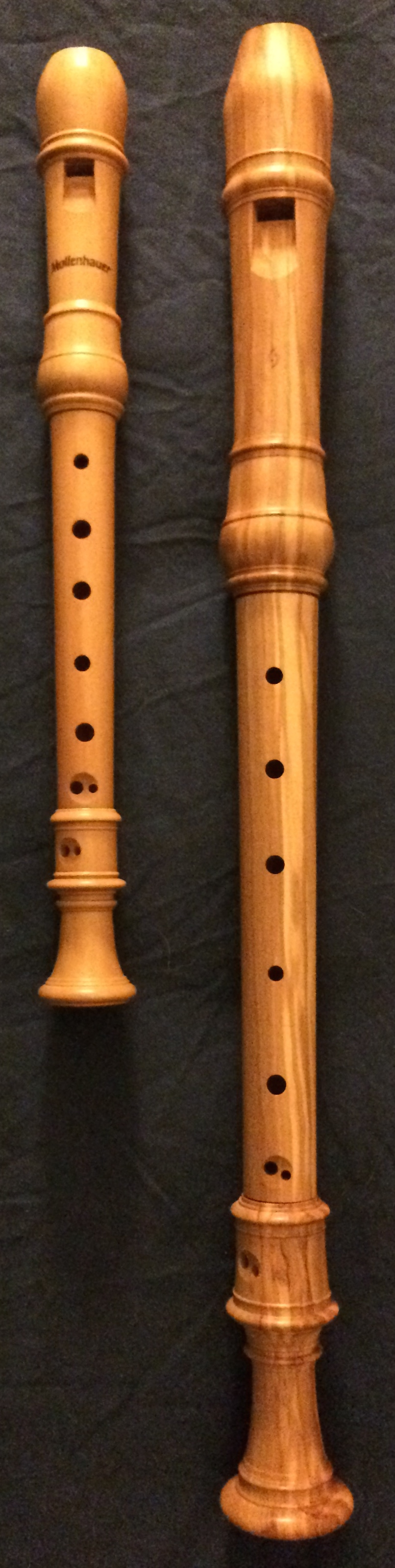
Modern three-piece alto recorder, next to a modern three-piece soprano recorder

The alto recorder in F, also known as a treble (and, historically, as consort flute and common flute) is a member of the recorder family. Up until the 17th century the alto instrument was normally in G_{4} instead of F_{4}. Its standard range is F_{4} to G_{6}.

The alto is between the soprano and tenor in size, and is correspondingly intermediate in pitch. It has the same general shape as a soprano, but is larger in all dimensions, resulting in a lower pitch for a given fingering.

The F alto is a non-transposing instrument, though its basic scale is in F, that is, a fifth lower than the soprano recorder and a fourth higher than the tenor (both with a basic scale in C). So-called F fingerings are therefore used, as with the bassoon or the low register of the clarinet, in contrast to the C fingerings used for most other woodwinds. (Note: To standardize fingerings across different sizes of recorders (sopranino, soprano, alto, tenor, bass), one can treat the recorders in F (sopranino, alto and bass) as transposing instruments. The method involves transposing their sheet music up by a perfect fifth and replacing F fingerings with C fingerings, as used on the soprano or tenor recorder.) Its notation is usually at sounding pitch, but sometimes is written an octave lower than it sounds.

== History ==
Recorders are known to have been made in different sizes since at least the 15th century, but a consistent terminology did not exist until the 20th-century revival of the instrument. In the early 16th century, books were published by Virdung, Agricola, and Ganassi, all of which describe the smallest of three sizes of recorder (tuned in fifths) as an instrument with the bottom note G. Appropriate to the highest instrument of the set, it is given a name used for the highest vocal part in music from that time: discant, Virdung also calls it clain flöte—"small flute", kleine Flöte in modern German) and sopran or soprano. At this time, recorders were made in a single piece. This type of instrument continued to be produced through the 17th century and into the early 18th, though around 1650 it began to be made in three separate parts. It was sometimes called the flauto italiano, particularly after about 1670 when a new type of recorder appeared in France, called flûte douce (sweet flute), what today would be called an alto (treble) in F. In contrast to the bright-toned flauto italiano, which was easy to play in the high register, the flüte douce was full and resonant in the low register, but was weak on the upper notes. This new version of recorder (first depicted in a painting from 1672) was first made in Paris and, shortly later and under French influence, in London. The redesign is traditionally attributed to the Hotteterres, particularly to Jean Hotteterre, though the evidence is rather tenuous. In 1696, Johann Christoph Denner and Johann Schell applied for permission to make the French type of instrument in Nuremberg, and it quickly became the dominant type of instrument across Europe. In most languages, this was the instrument meant by the word for flute alone: German Flöte, Dutch fluyt, Italian flauto, Spanish flauta. In England, it was usually simply "flute", but when necessary to differentiate from the transverse flute or other sizes of recorder, it was called "common flute" or "consort flute".
