= Kees Boeke (musician) =

Dutch recorder player and composer

- Born: 28 January 1950 (age 75); Amsterdam
- Genres: Early music, Baroque music, Contemporary music
- Instrument: Recorder

Kees Boeke (born January 1950) is a Dutch recorder player and composer.

== Biography and career ==
Kees Boeke was born in Amsterdam. After studying at the Royal Conservatory in The Hague (recorder with Frans Brüggen and cello with Anner Bijlsma), from which he graduated with honors, he founded the ensemble Quadro Hotteterre. He was for many years a member of the medieval and Renaissance Ensemble Syntagma Musicum (Kees Otten) and co-founder of Sour Cream (1972), Little Consort Amsterdam (1978) and the Ensemble Mala Punica (1989). In 2001 he formed the medieval ensemble Tetraktys.

In 1970 Kees Boeke began teaching at the Royal Conservatory of The Hague and in 1975 at the Sweelinck Conservatorium in Amsterdam. Since 1990 he has taught recorder and Early Music at the University of Music and Theatre in Zurich. From 2006 to 2014 he was professor of Medieval and Renaissance music at the Institute of Ancient Music in Trossingen (Germany).

He has held seminars and master classes for recorder and early music all over the world – among which the Deller Academy (Lacoste, France, 1972–1982), the International Early Music Courses (Urbino, Italy, from 1975 to 1982), and the Festival of Early Music Vancouver – and was responsible as artistic director for the Settimana Musicale di Pitigliano (1982–1986), as well as the International Courses of Early Music San Floriano (Polcenigo, Italy, 1983–1993). Since 1989 he has collaborated with the Accademia Musicale Chigiana in Siena, for which in 1994 he produced The Vespers (Psalmi a 4 Cori / Psalms for four choirs, 1612) by Ludovico da Viadana. Recently (2016) he established the Settimana Musicale del Trecento Settimana Musicale del Trecento, a summer course specializing in music of the fourteenth century, in the town of Arezzo in Tuscany.

In 1996, Kees Boeke began work as musical director for the ensemble Cantica Symphonia with whom he made recordings of motets by Costanzo Festa and masses of Guillaume Dufay. He was invited as a guest conductor by the vocal and instrumental ensemble "L'Homme Arme" in Florence and the ensemble Ars Nova Copenhagen for concerts in Holland, Belgium and Denmark. Over the years, he has collaborated with the Hilliard Ensemble in concerts and recordings of music by Heinrich Isaac, Orlando di Lasso, and Philippe de Monte, and with Philippe Pierlot's Ricercar Consort and the Concerto delle Viole of Roberto Gini.

Kees Boeke has recorded more than 70 records and CDs for Teldec, Das Alte Werk, EMI, RCA, New Age, Channel Classics, Arcana, Symphonia, Attack, Erato, Philips, Stradivarius, Glossa, Aiming and his own label Olive Music. In the field of contemporary music, he and Antonio Politano formed Duix, a duo that specializes in contemporary music for (contra)bass recorders and live electronics. In addition, Kees Boeke is active as a composer (Donemus, Amsterdam, Sheetmusicnow.com) and editor of early and contemporary music (Zen-On, Tokyo, Schott, London)

Since 2001 he has worked closely with Professor Laurenz Lütteken (University of Zurich) in projects and seminars in the field of medieval, renaissance and baroque music. In 2003, he started his CD label Olive Music, along with his wife, singer Jill Feldman. In addition, the two founded a new ensemble "Tetraktys" for medieval music. The Tetraktys programs include, among other things, the Tuscan Trecento, Chansons by Dufay and contemporaries, the Squarcialupi Codex, the complete recording of the Chantilly Codex, works by Ciconia, sacred and secular works by Matteo da Perugia, the song book of Johannes Heer etc.

He has lived in Tuscany since 1980, and is a producer of extra virgin olive oil. In 2019, he co-edited a complete edition of the Modena Codex.

== Compositions ==
- 1970 "4 in 3 in 2 in 1"
- 1971 "Tombeau de Hotteterre "
- 1974 "The history dump 2351"
- 1979 "The Chain"
- 1983 "Eclipse"
- 1985 "The Circle"
- 1986 "Eclipse" orchestral version
- 1992 "The Song"
- 1993 "'The unfolding"
- 1997 "VCS 7"
- 2003 "Susanna's Dream"
- 2003 "AHP (Aer)"

== Sources ==
- O'Kelly, Eve (1990). The Recorder Today. Cambridge: Cambridge University Press. ISBN 0521366607.
- The Image of Melancolly, Amsterdam Loeki Stardust Quartet and Kees Boeke, 1991, Channel Classics.
