= Syntagma Musicum =

Early 17th century music treatise

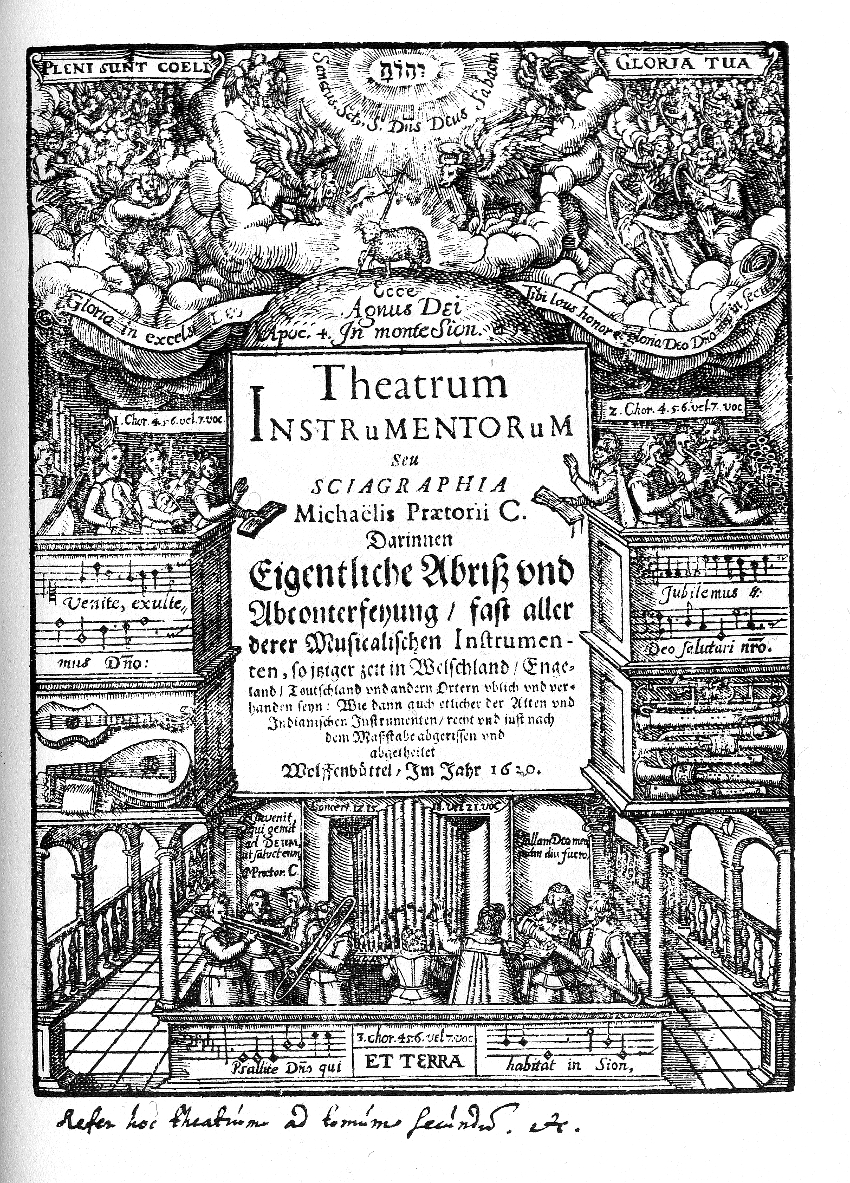

Syntagma Musicum (1614-1620) is a musical treatise in three volumes by the German composer, organist, and music theorist Michael Praetorius. It was published in Wittenberg and Wolfenbüttel. It is one of the most commonly used research sources for seventeenth-century music theory and performance practice. The second volume, De Organographia, illustrates and describes musical instruments and their use; this volume in particular became a valuable guide for research and reconstruction of early instruments in the twentieth century, and thus an integral part of the early music revival. Though never published, Praetorius intended to write a fourth volume on musical composition.

The three extant volumes are:

- I: Musicae Artis Analecta
- II: De Organographia
- III: Termini musicali

== Contents ==
=== Volume One: Musicae Artis Analecta ===
The first volume was written in Latin and divided into two parts, published separately. The first part, "on sacred or ecclesiastical music," shows Praetorius the biblical scholar, and comprises four sections that explore the music of the early church, uses of psalmody, the form of the Mass and liturgy, and the role of musical instruments as described in the Bible. This final section concludes with an argument for the continued use of instruments, and especially the organ, in the liturgy of the modern church. The second part, "a history of music outside the church," details classical examples (both historical and mythological) for various secular uses of music, from its use in times of war, in courtly ceremony or at banquets, to the response of animals to music, all topics that might be of particular interest to the educated nobility. The breadth of classical references is typical of commonplace books of the period, and Praetorius acknowledges his use of such reference works as Theodor Zwinger's Theatrum humanae vitae. The volume then continues with a discussion of vocal music, and concludes (again) with a section on musical instruments, this time from the perspective of classical sources.

=== Volume Two: De Organographia ===
The second volume is dedicated to the study of musical instruments, most especially the organ. Praetorius writes here in German, which he does in order to make his work accessible to craftsmen and instrument-makers. He opens with various methods for classifying instruments into families (part i), and then moves on to detailed descriptions of musical instruments of his own day (part ii), which vary in detail somewhat arbitrarily, dependent on Praetorius's personal interest and expertise. Parts iii and iv are dedicated to the organ, which Praetorius sees as the "instrument of instruments." Part iii is an attempt to write a history of the early organ, whilst part iv describes different styles of pipe within the contemporary organ, functioning in symmetry to the descriptions of individual instruments in part ii. Part v is a list of specifications of celebrated organs, including instruments such as the Compenius Organ and David Beck's organ for Groningen chapel, both instruments built for Praetorius's employers.

The final portion of De Organographia is the celebrated "Theater of Instruments," published separately the following year. This collection of woodcuts is celebrated for its detailed and accurate depictions of contemporary musical instruments of all sorts.

=== Volume Three: Termini musicali ===
The final published volume, also in German, is a mine of information on performance practice of Praetorius's day. It opens with a catalog of terms used for various genres of music (toccata, concerto, madrigal etc.), and then moves on to discuss elements of notation, mensuration, transposition and mode. Praetorius also includes detailed information on the new Italianate style, including instructions on figured bass for organists, and the means of its performance with instrumentalists and singers. Many of his ideas have formed the basis for today's "historically informed" performance of the music of his contemporaries, including Monteverdi.

== See also ==
- Syntagma (disambiguation)
- Organology
