= Soprano recorder =

Small woodwind instrument commonly used in schools

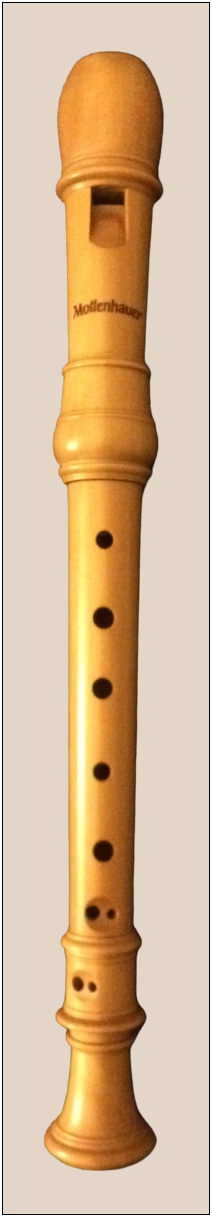
- Three-part soprano recorder in castello or zapatero "boxwood"
- Hornbostel–Sachs classification: 421.221.12 (Flute with internal duct and finger holes)

Playing range

The soprano recorder in C, also known as the descant, is the third-smallest instrument of the modern recorder family and is usually played as the highest voice in four-part ensembles (SATB = soprano, alto, tenor, bass). Since its finger spacing is relatively small, it is often used in music education for children first learning to play an instrument.

== Voice ==
The soprano recorder is an octave above the level of the human soprano voice. Its lowest note is C_{5}, and the normal range is C_{5}–D_{7}, but expert players achieve notes up to G_{7}. Compositions for soprano recorder are usually notated an octave lower than they sound. The timbre is similar to the sound of the flue pipes of an organ, which is why some organ stops sound similar to a recorder. These registers are called then block-flute or forest-flute.

== Fingerings ==
In addition to the traditional "Baroque" (or "English") fingering, which was created in Haslemere in 1919 by Arnold Dolmetsch, soprano recorders have been made that make use of "German" fingering, which was introduced by Peter Harlan around 1926. In German fingering the note f^{2} is playable with a simpler fingering than the Baroque technique's forked (or cross-) fingering. However, German fingering has been described as a "step backwards ... made on the false assumption that the instrument would be easier for schoolchildren". The disadvantage is that other, unavoidable cross-fingerings become more difficult.

== Material ==
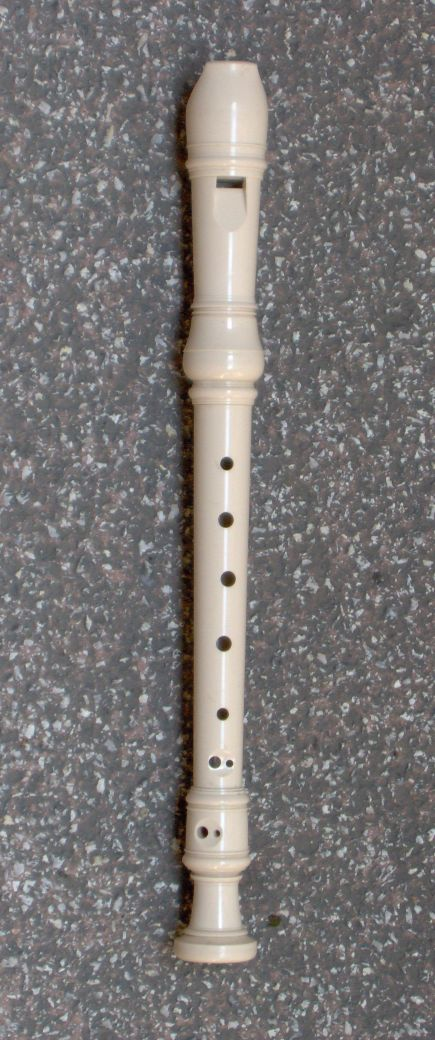
Soprano recorder entirely made out of plastic. Recorder with German fingering. Note that the 4th finger-hole is larger than the 5th.

Recorders with a plastic head joint or made completely of plastic are widely used. Soprano recorders are made from various woods such as maple, pear, boxwood, rosewood, olive, African blackwood, "rosewood", or ebony.

== Repertoire ==
Notably, the soprano recorder has the largest work for a solo wind instrument in European history, Der Fluyten Lust-hof composed by Jacob van Eyck.
