= Rottenburgh family =

The Rottenburgh family was a Belgian family of instrument makers and musicians who created a highly regarded collection of instruments in Brussels in the 18th century. The Rottenburgh family was the leading provider of wind instruments to the Belgian market in the 1700s, supplying the Royal Palace of Brussels and all of the city's cathedrals. They also made string instruments for these institutions.

The patriarch of the family, Herman-Arnold Rottenburgh (d. 1711), was a violinist in the royal chapel at the Palace of Coudenberg. His son, Jean-Hyacinth Rottenburgh (1672–1756), was the most important member of the Rottenburgh family. Jean-Hyacinth made woodwind and string instruments which are still valued today for use in early music ensembles; particularly recorders, flutes, oboes, bassoons, violins and cellos. As a woodwind maker Jean-Hyacinth used techniques of the French heritage of instrument making; utilizing a narrow bore that created instruments very similar to the designs and proportions of those made by Jacques-Martin Hotteterre. As a string instrument maker, Rottenburgh followed Flemish and German convention of construction, while simultaneously being influenced by Italian practices and preferences in proportion and timbre.

Jean-Hyacinth's son Godfroid-Adrien Rottenburgh (1703–68) and his grandson François-Joseph Rottenburgh (1743–1803) continued the family business of instrument making, and faced little competition in the Belgian market of the 18th century. Several instruments created by the family are part of the collection at the Musical Instrument Museum, Brussels.

Stefaan Ottenbourgs is the leading historian on the family and their instruments. In 1986 he published his doctoral dissertation "De familie Rottenburgh: Een muzikale dynastie te Brussel in de achttiende eeuw"; completing his degree at KU Leuven. This was followed by journal articles on the family published in Musica antiqua : actuele informatie over oude muziek (November 1988 and February 1989).

American music instrument maker Friedrich von Huene developed a model line of recorders for Moeck Musikinstrumente + Verlag named for the Rottenburgh family and inspired by the designs of their instruments which are still in production. The Rottenburgh line of recorders developed for Moeck were funded through a Guggenheim Fellowship given to Heine in 1966.
