= Paul Saintenoy =

Belgian architect, teacher, architectural historian, and writer

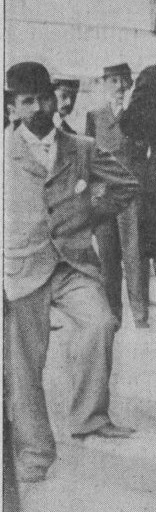
- Bruxelles, 1897
- Born: Paul Saintenoy; 19 June 1862; Ixelles, Belgium
- Died: 18 July 1952 (aged 90); Ixelles, Belgium
- Education: Royal Academy of Fine Arts
- Occupation: Architect
- Awards: Order of Leopold (1932)
- Buildings: Brussels-North railway station, Old England

Paul Saintenoy (19 June 1862 – 18 July 1952) was a Belgian architect, teacher, architectural historian, and writer.

== Family ==
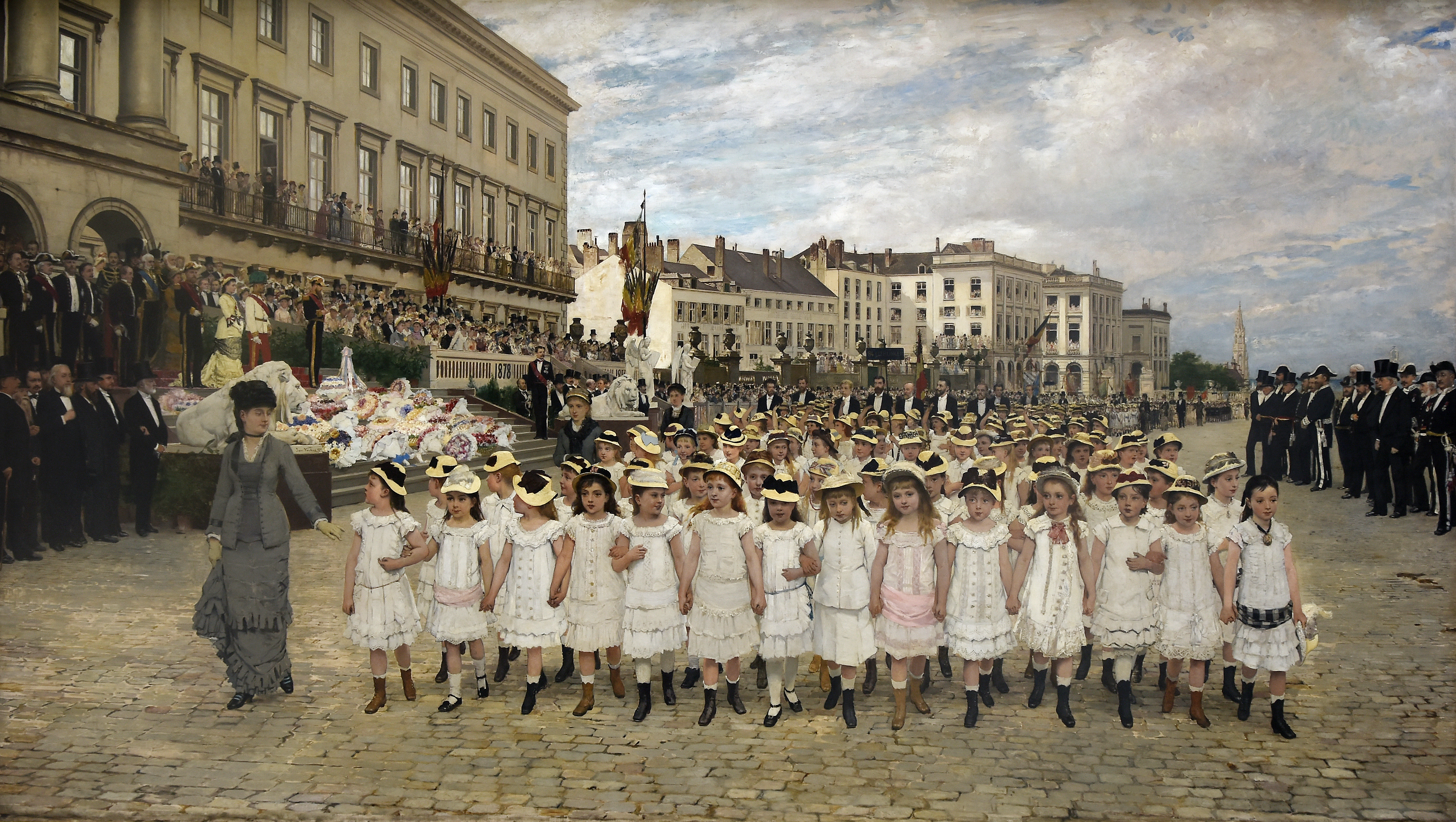
Louise Verhas-Saintenoy painted by her uncle Jan Verhas. She is the 8th girl from the left.

Born in 1862 in Ixelles, a municipality of Brussels, Belgium, Saintenoy was the son of the architect Gustave Saintenoy and Adele Cluysenaar, as well as the grandson of the famous architect Jean-Pierre Cluysenaar. The family's residence in Brussels was the Hôtel Saintenoy, which became a listed monument in 1992.

== Career ==
Beginning in 1881, Saintenoy studied architecture at the Royal Academy of Fine Arts in Antwerp, where he received training under the Antwerp architect Joseph Schadde. There he became interested in archaeology and the restoration of monuments from the Middle Ages, an activity in which Schadde was occupied.

He returned to Brussels to complete his training, and in the 1890s, became strongly influenced by the architecture of Victor Horta, Paul Hankar, and the rationalist architectural theories of Eugène Viollet-le-Duc, also famous for his work restoring Gothic buildings. Horta and Hankar's buildings laid the groundwork for the widespread development of the style called Art Nouveau in Belgium and France. Horta's buildings in particular made free and conspicuous use of industrialised methods of construction, with steel frames and large-scale glass panels as infill, allowing for interiors to be bathed in light and in large measure dissolving the boundary between interior and exterior. This became a preferred technique for the construction of retail shop windows and department stores, to encourage the practice of window-shopping.

Though Saintenoy was not nearly as famous as Horta, Hankar, Henry van de Velde or Gustave Serrurier-Bovy, the four most noteworthy practitioners of Art Nouveau in and from Belgium, he was well known at the turn of the century for his numerous buildings that use the style, most notably several smaller townhouses around Brussels, most of which still survive today and form part of the city's important heritage centred around the style. With his interest in archaeology, from the time he served as the general secretary of the Royal Society of Archaeology, he embarked upon a teaching career in 1910, as a professor of the history of architecture at the Académie Royale des Beaux-Arts in Brussels, a position he occupied for some thirty years.

At the end of World War I, Saintenoy was appointed a member of the Royal Commission of Monuments and Sites where he played an important role in the reconstruction of Belgium following the devastation of the war. Saintenoy's house in Brussels became a protected historic monument in 1992. One of his children, Jacques Saintenoy (1895–1947), also became an architect.

== Personal life ==
Saintenoy married Louise Ponselet, who is the niece of Jan Verhas. The little Louise figured in several of her uncle's paintings. They had two children:

- Jacques Saintenoy (1895–1947), architect
- Jacqueline Saintenoy (1900–1978), married to the French executed minister Pierre Pucheu

He died in 1952 and was interred in Ixelles Cemetery, his son Jacques was buried in 1947 in the same grave.

== Honours ==
- 1932: Commander of the Order of Leopold
- Member of the Royal Academy of Science, Letters and Fine Arts of Belgium

== Works ==
Saintenoy's works include:

- Renovation of the Hôtel Ravenstein, Brussels (1894)
- Renovation of the Hôtel Saintenoy (private house of the architect), Ixelles, Brussels (1897)
- Palace of the City of Brussels (Brussels International Exposition), Brussels (1897)
- Old England department store, Brussels (1898–99)
- Former Delacre Pharmacy, Brussels (1898)
- Hôtel Baron Lunden, Brussels (1898)
- Maison Losseau, Mons (1899)
- House of J. Van Ophem, Brussels (1900)
- Château Le Fy, Esneux (1904–05)
- Brussels-North railway station: clock tower and ticket hall (1952–1956)
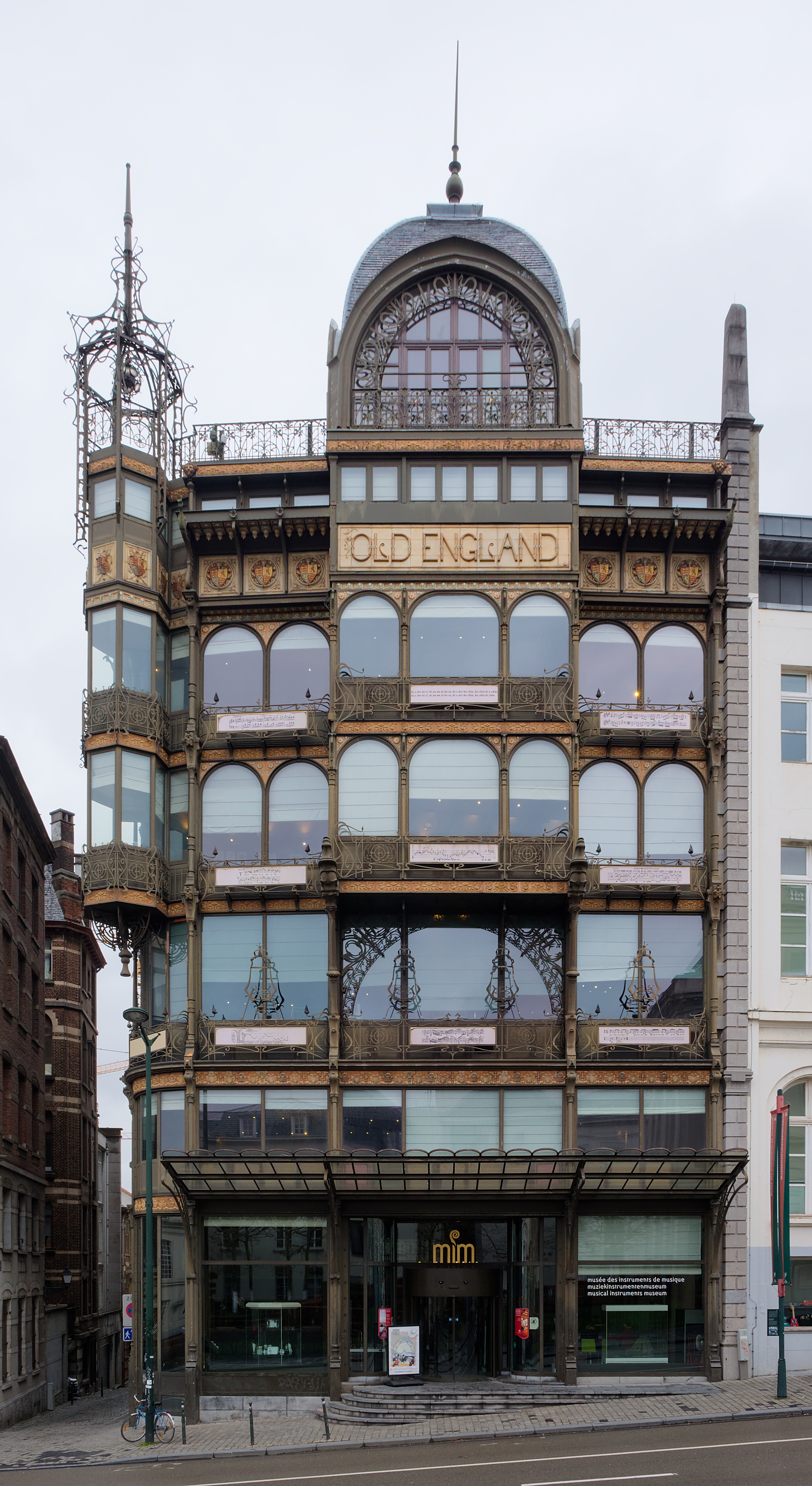
Old England department store, Brussels (1898–99)

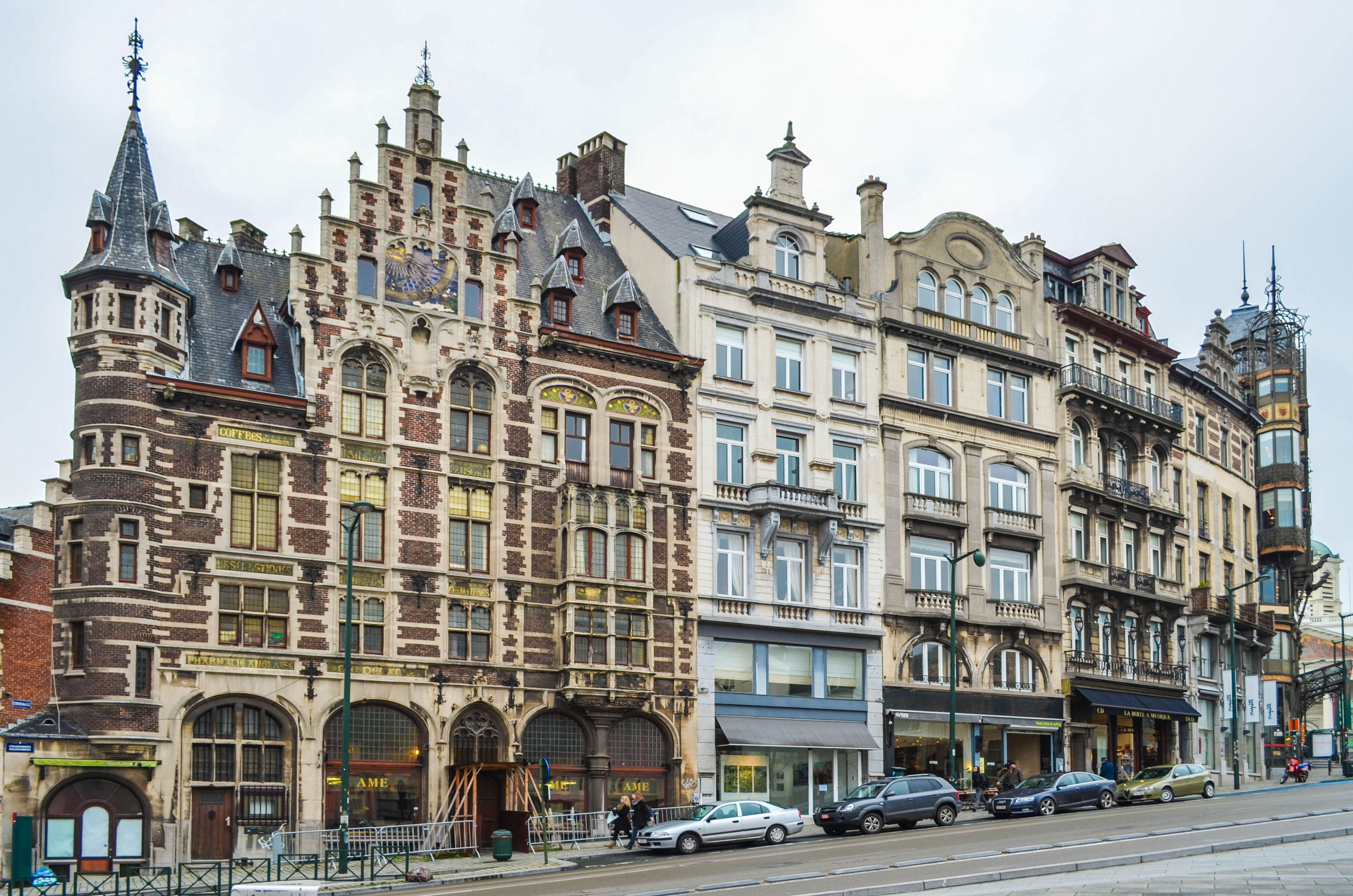
Former Delacre Pharmacy (on the left), Brussels (1898)

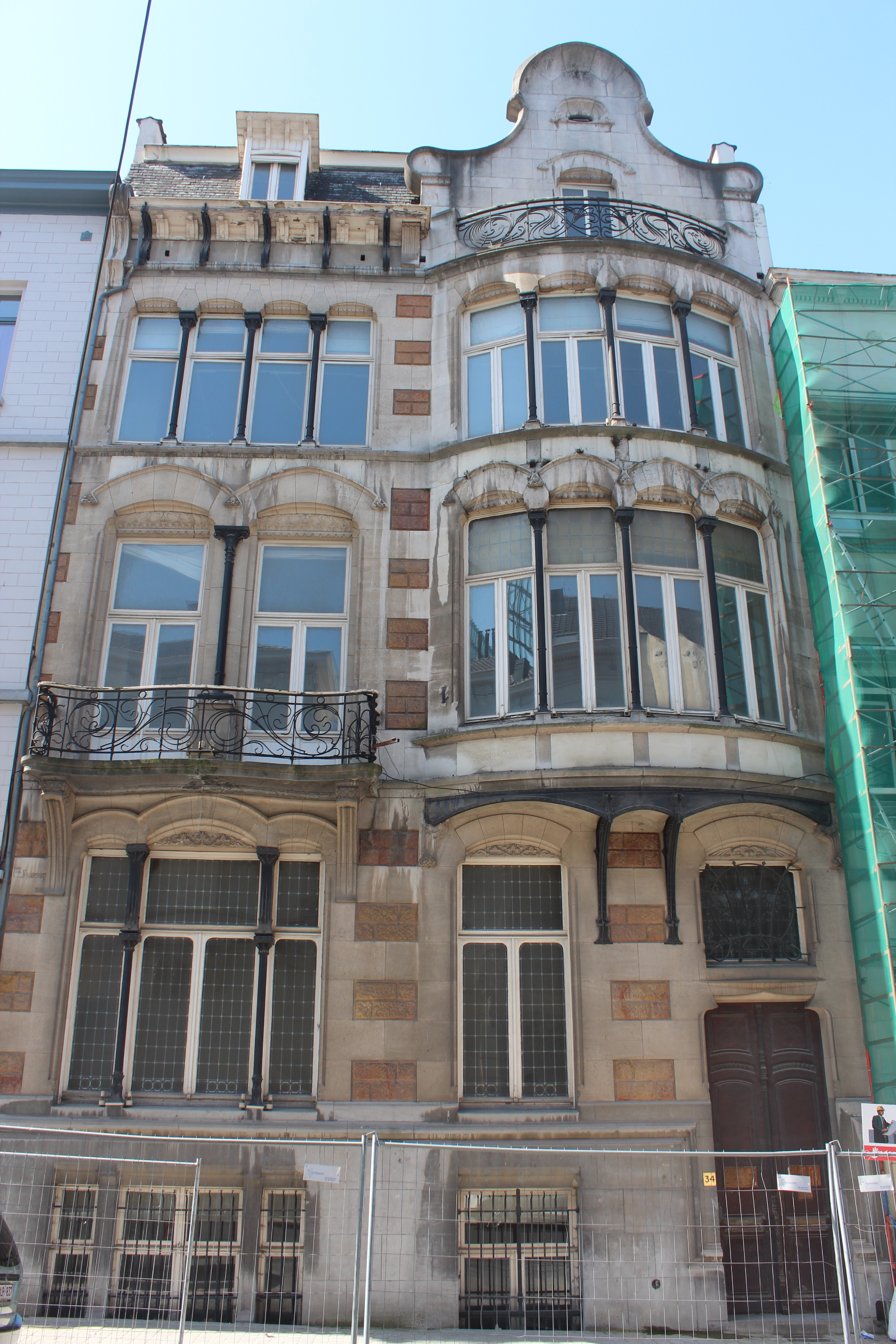
House of J. Van Ophem, Brussels (1900)

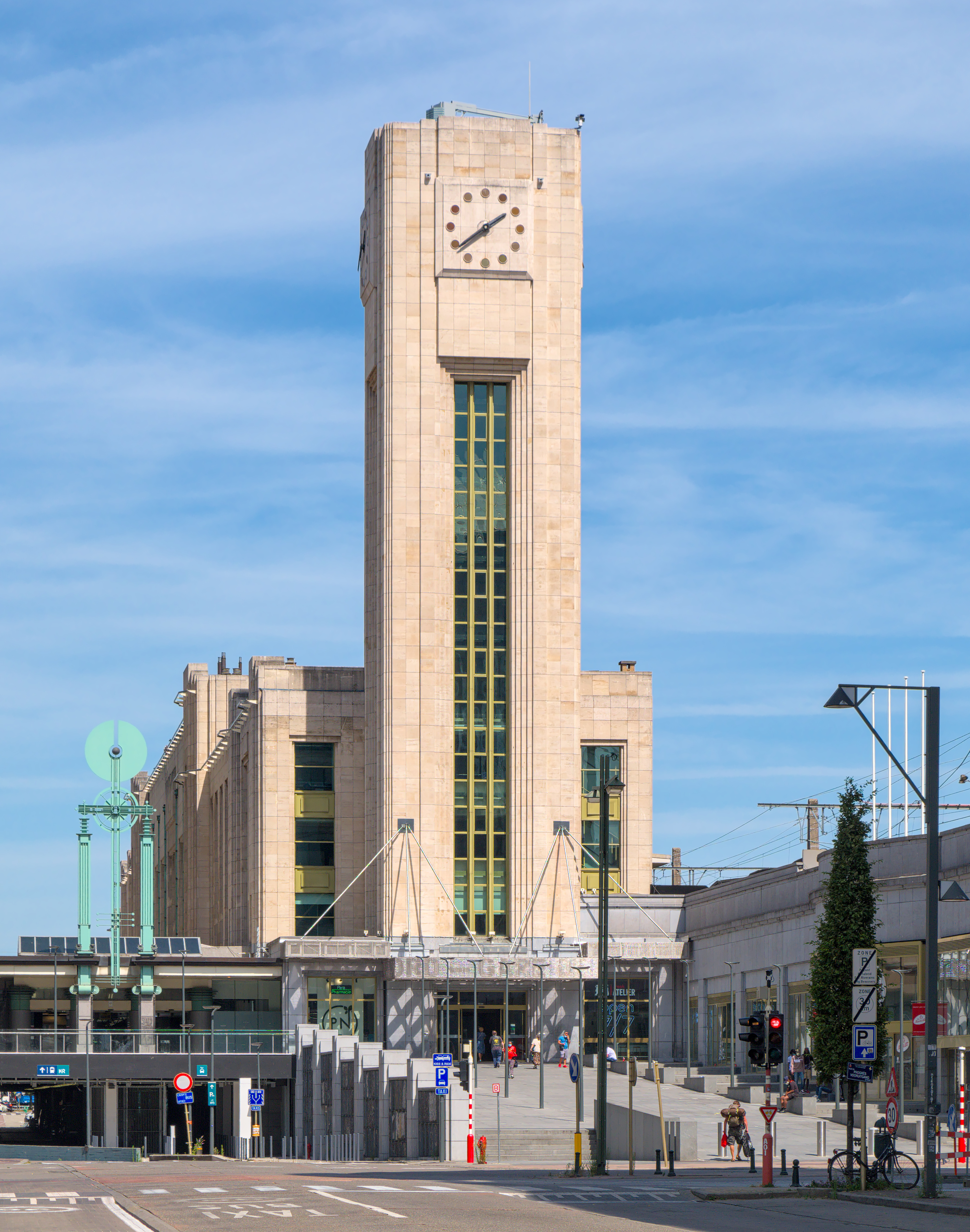
Clock tower of Brussels-North railway station (1952–1956)

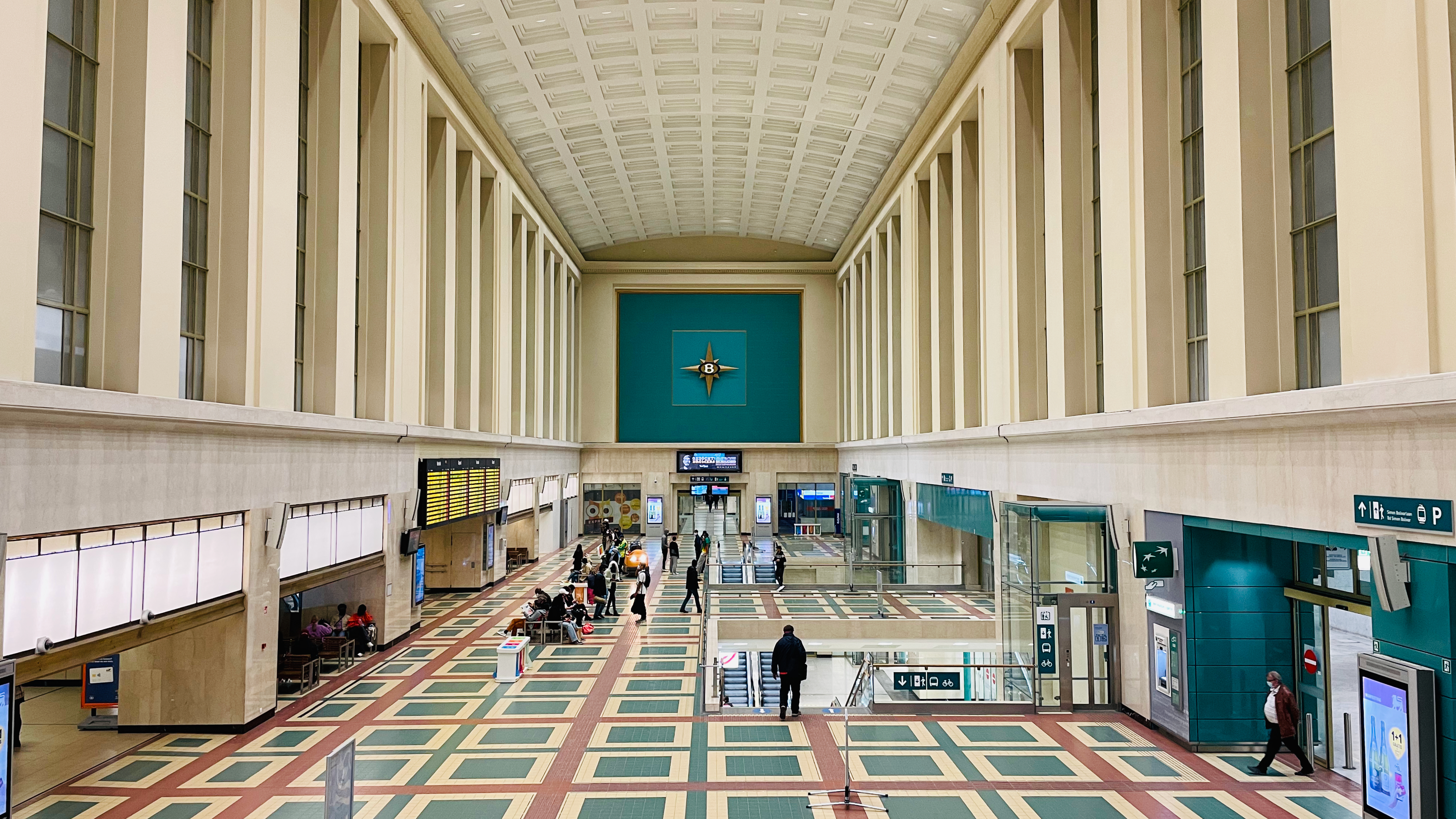
Ticket hall of Brussels' North Station (1952–1956)
