= Old England (department store) =

Former department store in Brussels, Belgium

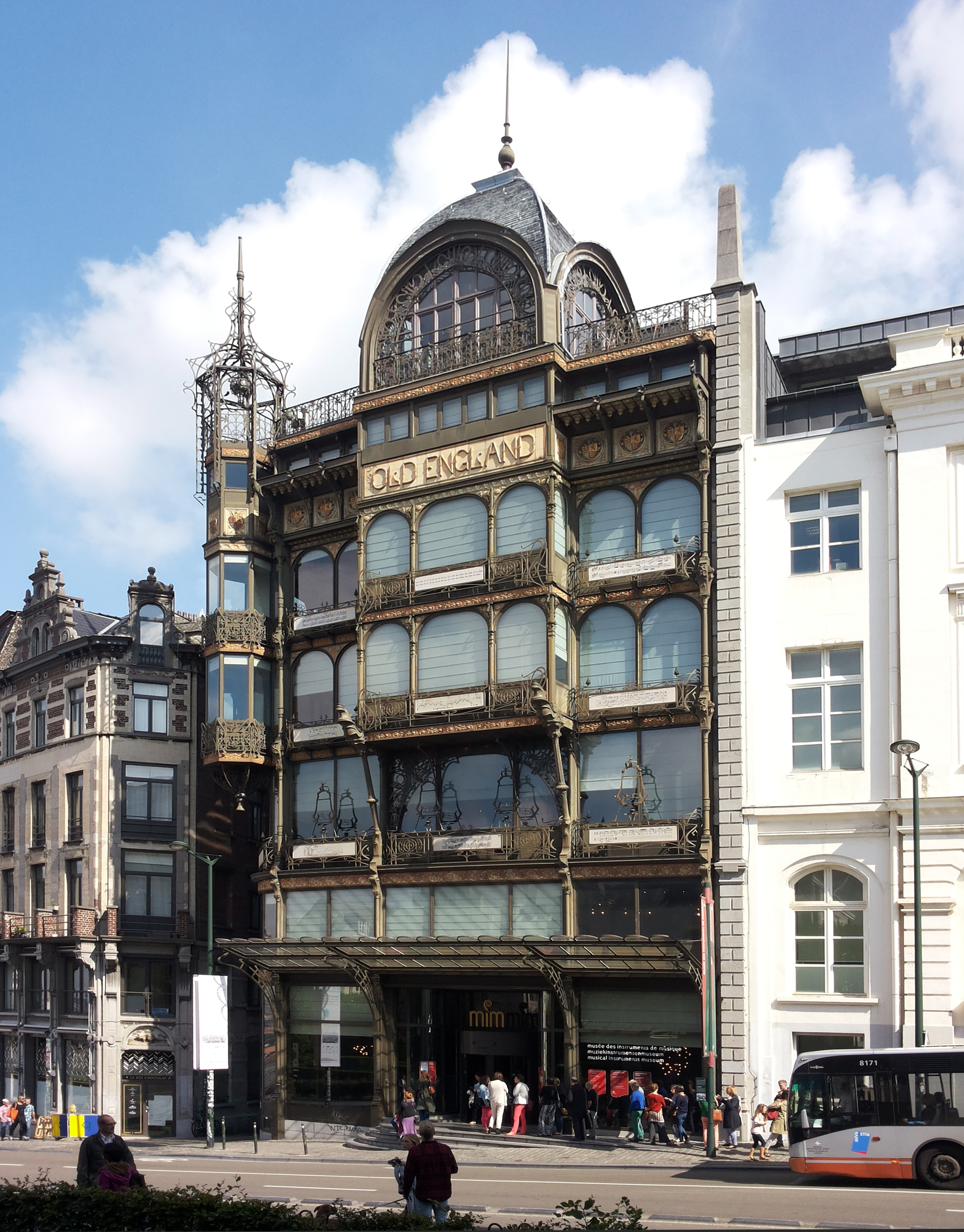
- Façade of the Old England department store, now the Musical Instruments Museum (MIM)
- Interactive map of the Old England area

General information
- Location: Rue Montagne de la Cour / Hofberg 2, 1000 City of Brussels, Brussels-Capital Region, Belgium
- Coordinates: 50°50′34″N 4°21′32″E

The Old England department store was a large retailer in central Brussels, Belgium, partially housed in an Art Nouveau building constructed in 1899 by Paul Saintenoy out of girded steel and glass. Nowadays, its former buildings house the Musical Instruments Museum (MIM), founded in 1877, which forms part of the group of Royal Museums for Art and History (RMAH).

Located at 2, rue Montagne de la Cour/Hofberg on the Mont des Arts/Kunstberg, the building stands next to the Place Royale/Koningsplein and across the street from the Magritte Museum.

== History ==
From 1886 onwards, the company's primary location was actually in the main building of the former Hôtel de Spangen, a complex of residences built mostly by Corneille Juste Philibert Philippe, Count of Spangen, between 1775 and 1782 on the Place Royale/Koningsplein in central Brussels. The property was eventually sold and partitioned to several different enterprises, including a hotel, and eventually the Old England company, which successively acquired more of the complex in stages in 1905, 1909, and 1911. In 1913, Old England completed renovations that demolished the 18th-century interiors in order to better accommodate its retail functions.

== Paul Saintenoy ==
The building was designed by the architect Paul Saintenoy, who was strongly influenced by the architecture of Victor Horta, Paul Hankar, and the rationalist architectural theories of Eugène Viollet-le-Duc, also famous for his work restoring Gothic buildings. Horta and Hankar's buildings laid the groundwork for the widespread development of the style called Art Nouveau in Belgium and France. Horta's buildings in particular made free and conspicuous use of industrialised methods of construction, with steel frames and large-scale glass panels as infill, allowing for interiors to be bathed in light and in large measure dissolving the boundary between interior and exterior. This became a preferred technique for the construction of retail shop windows and department stores, to encourage the practice of window-shopping.

Though Saintenoy was not nearly as famous as Horta, Hankar, Henry van de Velde or Gustave Serrurier-Bovy, the four most noteworthy practitioners of Art Nouveau in and from Belgium, he was well known at the turn of the century for his numerous buildings that use the style, most notably several smaller town houses around Brussels, most of which still survive today and form part of the city's important heritage centred around the style.

== Art Nouveau branch of Old England ==
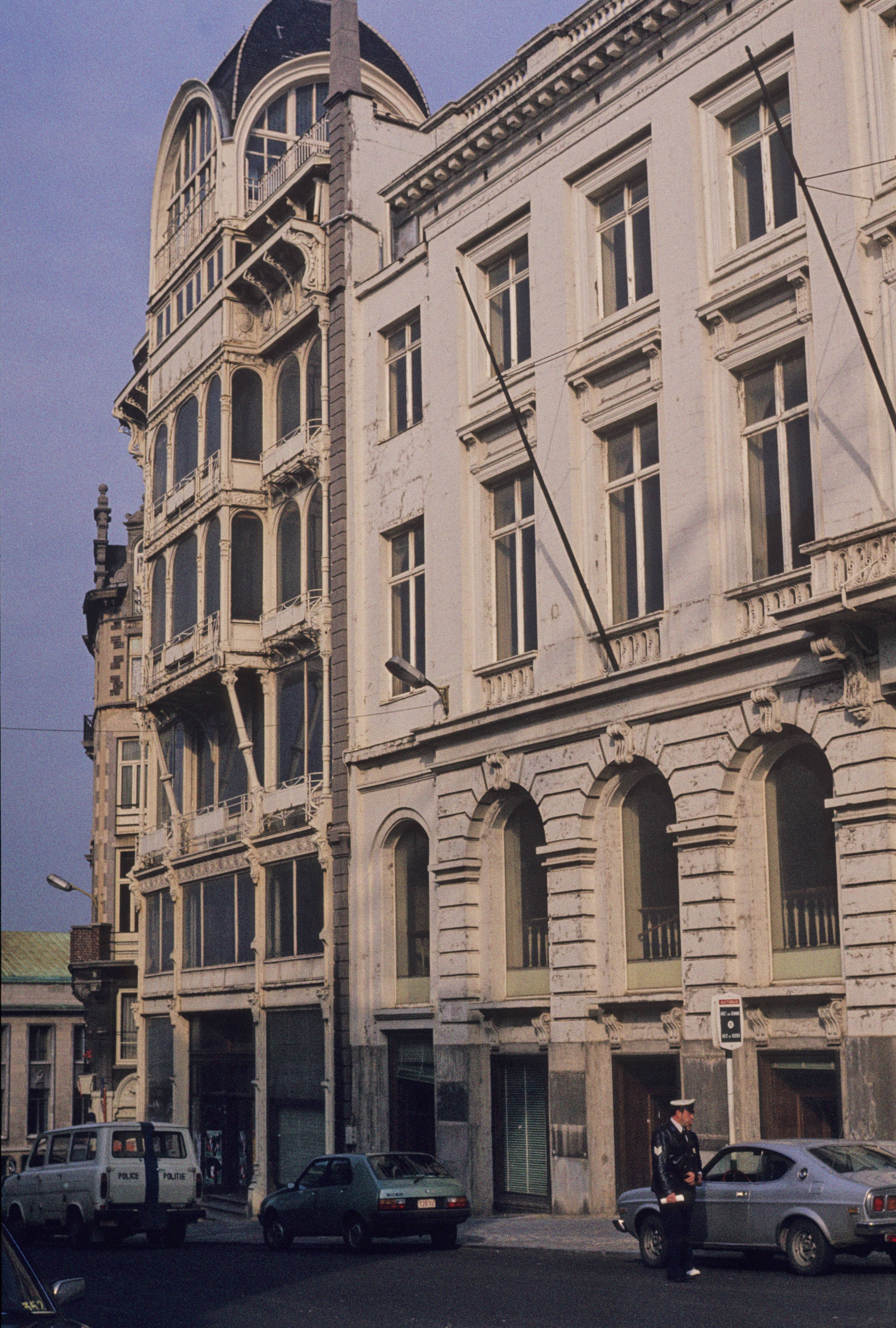
The Old England department store in 1981, after having been bought by the Belgian state and before restoration

The Old England department store opened a new branch location not far from its original building on the Place Royale in 1899, designed by Saintenoy in collaboration with the engineer Emile Wyhowski de Bukanski. Using a steel superstructure, he negotiated the rather narrow lot that sloped significantly and curved along the line of the street, designing a six-storey building that used a main façade balanced around a projecting central oriel bay, itself crowned by a high arched attic. The building's expansive curtain walls of glass over the entire façade maximise the influx of natural light, which is accented by the octagonal oriel tower at the north-west corner of the building that begins on the fourth floor and terminates in a lacy steel pergola that uses the structural frame of a cupola's spire. Its ornament, painted a dark green like the rest of the structure, curves around the frame to create supporting brackets that mimic the forms of vines and tendrils of plants, hallmarks of the "industrial" type of Art Nouveau design.

The structure thus constitutes an essay in the structural properties of iron and steel, which maximises its utility as a department store. The vibrant green colour, accented by the yellow and orange enamelled signage proclaiming the store's name, set it off from the light masonry and stucco structures around it, functioning thus as a landmark in the streetscape. The large expanses of glass for the exterior envelope allowed potential customers to easily and casually peruse the items from the street, ultimately drawing them inside to shop more aggressively, and providing a modicum of transparency in the process of selling by declaring implicitly that the company had nothing to hide from consumers.

None of these architectural strategies were new for the department store or retail shop as a building type, but Saintenoy's Old England store is one of the earliest examples of the bare iron/steel-and-glass curtain-wall façade being employed on such a large scale (most earlier department stores had clad their metal frame in some kind of masonry, at least on the façade). Horta would employ the same strategy on his À L'Innovation store in Brussels, completed in 1901, as would Henry Gutton on his Grand Bazar de la rue de Rennes in Paris, a branch of the Magasins Réunis department store chain, finished in 1907.

== Subsequent history and transformation ==
The building was bought by the Belgian government in 1978 after Old England moved out in 1972. It took over fifteen years to complete restoration and renovation work on the structure, which really began in 1989, and was in fairly bad shape. The same year, it was listed as a protected monument by the Monuments and Sites Directorate of the Brussels-Capital Region. The Musical Instruments Museum (MIM) moved into the structure between 1989 and 1994. Its exhibits include significant sections on Brussels' role in the history of manufacturing musical instruments, including the birthplace of the saxophone as the home of Adolphe Sax.

== See also ==
- Art Nouveau in Brussels
- History of Brussels
- Culture of Belgium
- Belgium in the long nineteenth century
