= London International Festival of Early Music =

English music festival

The London International Festival of Early Music (LIFEM) is an English music festival which is devoted mainly to Baroque and Renaissance music. It takes place each November in Blackheath, London, at Blackheath Halls.

== History ==
The festival was founded in 1973 and initially took place at the Royal College of Music before moving to the Old Royal Naval College, Greenwich, and taking on the name Greenwich Early Music Festival. Each year, the Festival invites performers and exhibitors from across the world to perform concerts and exhibit their goods. As well as Baroque music, LIFEM commissions new works for performance by the visiting ensembles (in 2020, they commissioned John Paul Jones to write The Tudor Pull for Fretwork).

The festival has been known by several names in its history. It operated as the Greenwich Early Music Festival until 2016, when it made what was expected to be a temporary move to Blackheath. Throughout its history it has had a close relationship with The Early Music Shop, which supports and runs the Festival.

During the COVID-19 pandemic in 2020 a series of recorded concerts under the name LIFEM: Digital replaced in-person events. The festival also became a registered charity in 2020, and appointed its first artistic director, Gill Graham. The trustees are Susannah Simons, Tony Millyard, Caro Barnfield and Chris Butler.

Festival Review of LIFEM 2020

== Competitions ==
Since the competition was established in 1985, LIFEM has hosted the final of the Society of Recorder Players / Moeck Competition for solo recorder performance. Winners of the biennial competition receive cash prizes and perform a solo recital at LIFEM in the year following their win.

Previous winners have included Tabea Debus, Piers Adams, Robert Ehrlich, Ashley Solomon and Chris Orton.

The LIFEM Young Ensemble Award is a biennial competition for ensembles specialising in historical performance practise and was established in 2018.

Previous winners:

• 2018: Palisander & Pypker/Muskens Duo

• 2020: Ensemble Pro Victoria & Ensemble Hesperi.

== Past performers/exhibitors at LIFEM ==
- Chetham's Early Music Ensemble
- Elizabeth Kenny (lute)
- Fretwork (viol consort)
- His Majestys Sagbutts & Cornetts
- Mahan Esfahani (harpsichord)
- Tabea Debus (Recorder)
- Palisander (Recorder Quartet)
- Olwen Foulkes (recorder)
- Eric Moulder from PIVA – The Renaissance Collective (maker of and performer on renaissance wind instruments)
- Klop (makers of early keyboard instruments)
- Red Priest
- Sarah Jeffery (recorder: performer / visiting tutor)
- Solomon's Knot (vocal consort)
- Stile Antico
- The Early Music Shop (organisers of the festival)
- The Lute Society
- Thomas Tallis Choir
- Tinka Pypker-Anders Muskens (soprano/fortepiano duo)

== See also ==
- Historically informed performance
- Lute
- Harpsichord
- Recorder (musical instrument)
