= Friedrich von Huene (musician) =

American recorder maker

Friedrich Alexander von Huene
- Born: Friedrich Freiherr von Hoyningen, genannt Huene; February 20, 1929; Breslau, Germany
- Died: May 8, 2016 (aged 87); Bath, Maine, U.S.
- Citizenship: American
- Education: Bowdoin College
- Occupation: Recorder maker
- Years active: 1960-2015
- Notable work: Moeck Rottenburgh recorders
- Spouse: Ingeborg Reiser
- Children: Andreas, Patrick, Nikolaus, Thomas, and Elisabeth
- Parents: Heinrich A.N. von Hoyningen genannt Huene (father); Aimée Freeland Corson Ellis (mother)

Friedrich Freiherr von Hoyningen, genannt Huene (February 20, 1929 – May 8, 2016), known professionally as Friedrich Alexander von Huene, was an American recorder maker.

== Life and career ==
Friedrich was born in Breslau, a community that was then part of Germany and is now in Poland, the day after his parents attended a harpsichord recital by Wanda Landowska. He was the oldest of six children. His father, Heinrich A.N. von Hoyningen genannt Huene, was from a Baltic German baronial family, and his mother, Aimée Freeland Corson Ellis, was from Connecticut. His father died during the war, and family emigrated to the United States in 1948. He entered Bowdoin College, left to join the U.S. Air Force where he played flute and piccolo in a military band, then returned to Bowdoin to complete his degree in 1953. He became an American citizen and in 1954, and married Ingeborg Reiser, whom he had met in Germany. They had five children. In addition, he had an extra-marital child with the Dutch painter Machteld Kuijpers, descendant of a long line of Dutch painters. Turning down an offer of a stipend to attend Harvard University, he began to work for flute maker Verne Q. Powell. Inspired by a Telemann concert in 1955, he began to make recorders. Bernard Krainis, founder of New York Pro Musica, purchased one of von Huene's recorders, and he soon obtained enough orders for more instruments to open his own shop in Waltham, Massachusetts. He was awarded a Guggenheim Fellowship in 1966,which allowed him to work with Moeck to develop their Rottenburgh model line (named after the Rottenburgh family of instrument makers) of Baroque recorders. He also helped Zen-On develop a line of high-quality plastic recorders. In 1980, he and his wife opened a retail division, The Early Music Shop of New England, to sell other brands of instruments. Their store and workshop is now operated by their son Patrick von Huene. They were involved in the founding of the Boston Early Music Festival and were charter members of the Boston Camerata.

He died of complications from Parkinson’s disease in Bath, Maine (May 8, 2016), aged 87 years old.

== Awards ==
In addition to his Guggenheim Fellowship, Friedrich received the American Recorder Society’s first Distinguished Achievement Award in 1987, the Curt Sachs award from the American Musical Instrument Society in 2003, an achievement award from the National Flute Association in 2004, the Howard Mayer Brown award from Early Music America in 2005, and an honorary doctorate from Bowdoin College in 1984.
