= Robert Ehrlich (musician) =

British musician (born 1965)

Robert Ehrlich (born in 1965 in Belfast) is a Northern Irish recorder player and university professor. From October 2015 until 2019, he was rector of the Hochschule für Musik Hanns Eisler Berlin. Previously, he was rector of the University of Music and Theatre Leipzig from 2006 to 2015.

== Life ==
Ehrlich was born in Belfast. He initially studied musicology at King's College, Cambridge. In 1990, he obtained a master's degree in ethnomusicology (M.Phil.). He then studied recorder with Walter van Hauwe at the Conservatorium van Amsterdam.

He performs worldwide as a soloist and in ensembles, including with the Academy of Ancient Music, the Leipzig Gewandhaus Orchestra and The English Concert. His CD recordings include recordings of Bach's Brandenburg Concertos in three different pitches with Riccardo Chailly (A_{4}=443 Hz), Trevor Pinnock (A_{4}=415 Hz) and Richard Egarr (A_{4}=392 Hz). The latter two recordings won Gramophone Awards in the categories "Best Baroque Instrumental" and "Editor’s Choice".

From 1990 to 1993, Ehrlich taught recorder and teaching methodology part time at the Hochschule für Musik Karlsruhe. He was also a guest lecturer for performance practice at the University of Southampton. Since 1993 he has been professor of recorder at the University of Music und Theatre Leipzig and since 1998 visiting professor at the Guildhall School of Music and Drama in London. In 2006, Ehrlich was elected rector of the University of Music and Theatre Leipzig, where he was re-elected by a large majority for a second term by the Extended Senate in 2010.

In 2015, he was elected rector of the Hochschule für Musik Hanns Eisler Berlin by the Extended Academic Senate. In 2019, following the end of his period of office at the HfM Hanns Eisler Berlin, he resumed his tenure as professor in Leipzig. From 2019 to 2024 he was a member of the University Senate and was designated special representative of the Department of Composition and Music Theory in 2021.

== Functions, public offices and honorary offices ==
- 2012-2015 Vice-Chairman of the Landesrektorenkonferenz Saxony
- 2014 Patron Christopher Street Day Leipzig
- 2014-2019 Member of the Board of the Rectors' Conference of the German Universities of Music

== Awards ==
- 1987: Schott Chamber Music Competition in London (Ensemble The Cambridge Musick with Robert Ehrlich – recorder, Andrew Manze – violin, Mark Levy – viola da gamba, and Richard Egarr – Harpsichord)
- 1988: ARD International Music Competition in Munich
- 1989: Moeck/SRP Competition in cooperation with London International Festival of Early Music (LIFEM)

== Writings (selection) ==
- "Du mußt dich nicht fürchten; diese Insel ist voll von Getöse: Rede anlässlich der feierlichen Investitur in das Rektorenamt" (PDF). MT-Journal, issue 22 (2006), Sonderbeilage, 2–8.
- "Festrede zur Gründung der Stiftung der Hochschule für Musik und Theater" (PDF). MT-Journal, issue 28 (2010) Sonderbeilage, 2–7.
- "Serendipität" (PDF). Denkströme. Journal der Sächsischen Akademie der Wissenschaften, issue 5 (2010), 9–17.
- "Die verlorenen Hanns Eisler-Bilder von Prof. Roland Paris". Essay in the programme book Akademischer Festakt der Hochschule für Musik Hanns Eisler, Berlin 2016.
- "Germany National Overview; Overview of Higher Music Education System", ed. AEC (Association Européenne Conservatoires, Académies de Musique et Musikhochschulen) 2017.
- "Wiedergefundene Fragmente eines Hochschularchivs". Essay in the programme book Akademischer Festakt der Hochschule für Musik Hanns Eisler, Berlin 2018.
- The Great German Recorder Epidemic: Reinventing the Recorder, 1925–1950. (Instant Harmony Essay Series, vol. 1) Portland 2021.
- The Recorder, co-authored with David Lasocki. (Yale University Press Musical Instrument Series) London & New York 2022. (Further contributions by Nikolaj Tarasov and Michala Petri.) ISBN 9780300118704.
