= Musical Instruments Museum, Brussels =

Music museum in Brussels, Belgium

Musical Instruments Museum (MIM)
- Musée des instruments de musique (French); Muziekinstrumentenmuseum (Dutch)
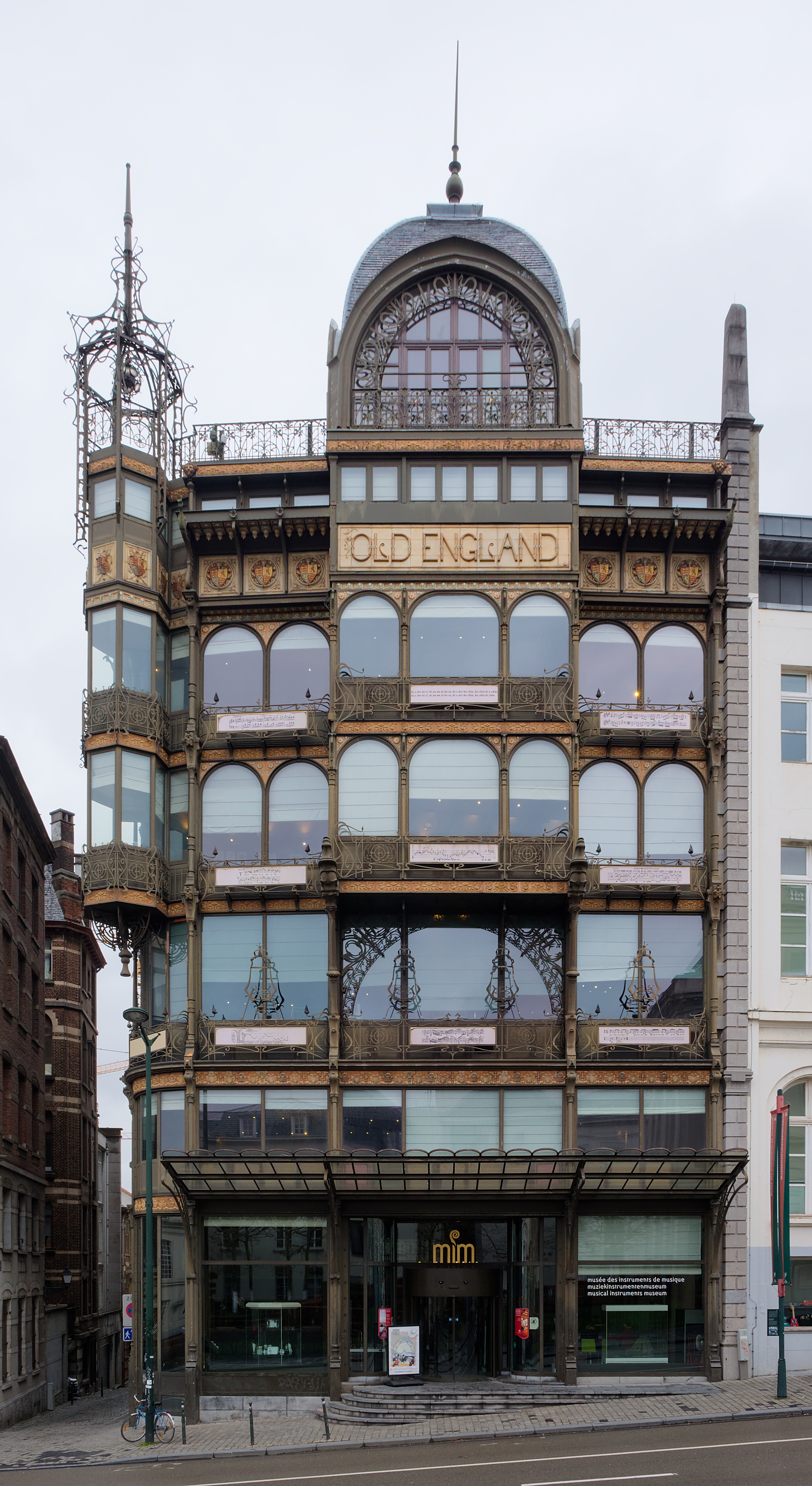
- Exterior of the Musical Instruments Museum (MIM)'s Old England building
- Interactive fullscreen map
- Established: 1877; 149 years ago
- Location: Rue Montagne de la Cour / Hofberg 2, 1000 City of Brussels, Brussels-Capital Region, Belgium
- Coordinates: 50°50′34″N 4°21′32″E
- Type: Music museum
- Public transit access: Brussels-Central; 1 5 Gare Centrale/Centraal Station and Parc/Park
- Parking: No
- Website: www.mim.be/en

The Musical Instruments Museum (MIM) (French: Musée des instruments de musique; Dutch: Muziekinstrumentenmuseum) is a music museum in the Royal Quarter of Brussels, Belgium. It is part of the Royal Museums of Art and History (RMAH) and is internationally renowned for its collection of next to 10,000 instruments.

Since 2000, the museum has been housed in the former Old England department store, built in 1899 by Paul Saintenoy in Art Nouveau style, as well as the adjoining 18th-century neoclassical building designed by Barnabé Guimard. It is located at 2, rue Montagne de la Cour/Hofberg on the Mont des Arts/Kunstberg, next to the Place Royale/Koningsplein and across the street from the Magritte Museum.

== History ==
=== Early history ===
The Musical Instruments Museum (MIM)'s collection was created in 1877 and was originally attached to the Royal Conservatory of Brussels with the purpose of demonstrating early instruments to students. It consisted of a hundred Indian instruments given to King Leopold II by Raja Sourindro Mohun Tagore in 1876, as well as the collection of the musicologist François-Joseph Fétis, purchased by the Belgian government in 1872, and put on deposit in the Conservatory, where Fétis was the first director. Its first curator, Victor-Charles Mahillon, greatly expanded the already impressive collection, and by the time of his death in 1924, the museum consisted of some 3,666 articles, among which 3,177 were original musical instruments. He was noted for his astute judgement in obtaining these large collections by calling on philanthropists, mixing with erudite amateurs who sometimes became generous donors, and through friendly relations with Belgian diplomats in foreign posts, who sometimes brought back instruments from beyond Europe.

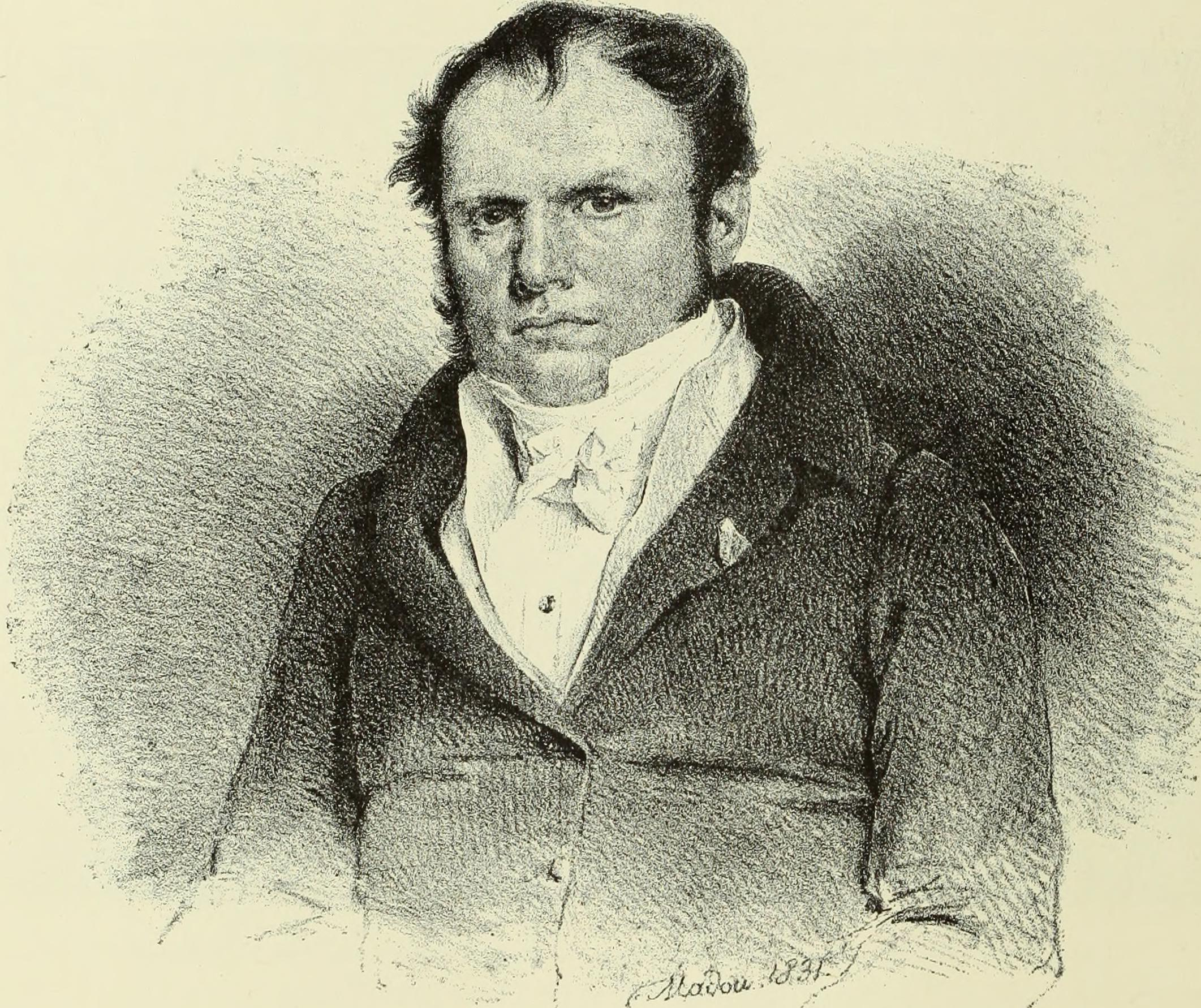
François-Joseph Fétis, first director of the Royal Conservatory of Brussels

The monumental five-volume catalogue of the Mahillon collection, commissioned between 1880 and 1922, also included four versions of his essay on the methodical classification of both ancient and modern instruments, which was to serve as the basis for the Hornbostel-Sachs classification systems, still used in organology today. Beginning in 1877, Mahillon also established a restoration workshop at the museum, where he employed and trained a worker, Franz de Vestibule, to restore damaged instruments and make copies of unique pieces from other public collections. Mahillon's successor at the Conservatory, François-Auguste Gevaert, organised several concerts of professors and students playing early instruments, in the 1880s.

=== 20th and 21st centuries ===
After the First World War, donors and philanthropists, as well as Belgium's famed instrument makers, started becoming scarcer. As a result, only around a thousand instruments were added to the collections between 1924 and 1968. Until 1957, the curators at the head of the museum—Ernest Closson (from 1924 to 1936), his son Herman (from 1936 to 1945), and René Lyr (from 1945 to 1957)—limited themselves to preserving the already collected instruments, in not always satisfactory conditions. Ernest is notable for editing several articles on Belgian makers for the National Biography and devoting a long monograph to La facture des instruments de musique en Belgique, which appeared at the Brussels International Exposition of 1935.

With the arrival of the Latinist Roger Bragard, curator between 1957 and 1968, larger budgets became available from the Ministry of Culture, as exhibits were renovated, new personnel were hired, concerts were again organised, and new rare pieces were collected. Between 1968 and 1989, René de Mayer continued the momentum initiated by Bragard, assisted by a team of specialised scientists. It was not until the beginning of the 1990s, however, that the MIM's revival really began, when Nicolas Meeùs took over its management (from 1989 to 1995) on an interim basis. He started to design the layout of the museum in the former Old England department store, bought since 1978 by the Belgian state. The building's restoration lasted until 1994, when it won the Quartier des Arts prize for the quality of the renovation of the façades. The MIM moved under the direction of Malou Haine (from 1994 to 2009). In 1998, the MIM became the building's official occupant, and after two years of development, the museum, renovated and resolutely modern, opened its doors to the general public. Haine remains honorary curator of the museum.

== Exhibits ==
With over 7,000 pieces from all around the world, this museum houses one of the largest collections of musical instruments on the planet. Mechanical instruments are shown in the basement, traditional instruments on the ground floor, the development of modern orchestral instruments on the first floor, and keyboard and stringed instruments on the second floor. Among the collection's notable pieces are the Rottenburgh Alto recorder, instruments invented by Adolphe Sax, a unique set of giant Chinese stone chimes, and the only existing copy of the luthéal, an instrument used by Ravel.

The museum's collection presents Belgian musical history, including Brussels' importance in the production of recorders and various obscure proto-synthesizers (Ondes Martenot, Theremin, etc.) in the 18th and 19th centuries, as well as the home of the instrument inventor Adolphe Sax in the 19th century. The collection also showcases European musical traditions and non-European instruments. Visitors are given infrared headphones in order to listen to almost 300 musical extracts of the instruments on display.

Besides exhibiting the permanent collection, the museum occasionally also hosts temporary exhibitions and concerts of influential contemporary inventors such as the Baschet Brothers, Pierre Bastien, Yuri Landman, Logos Foundation, and others.

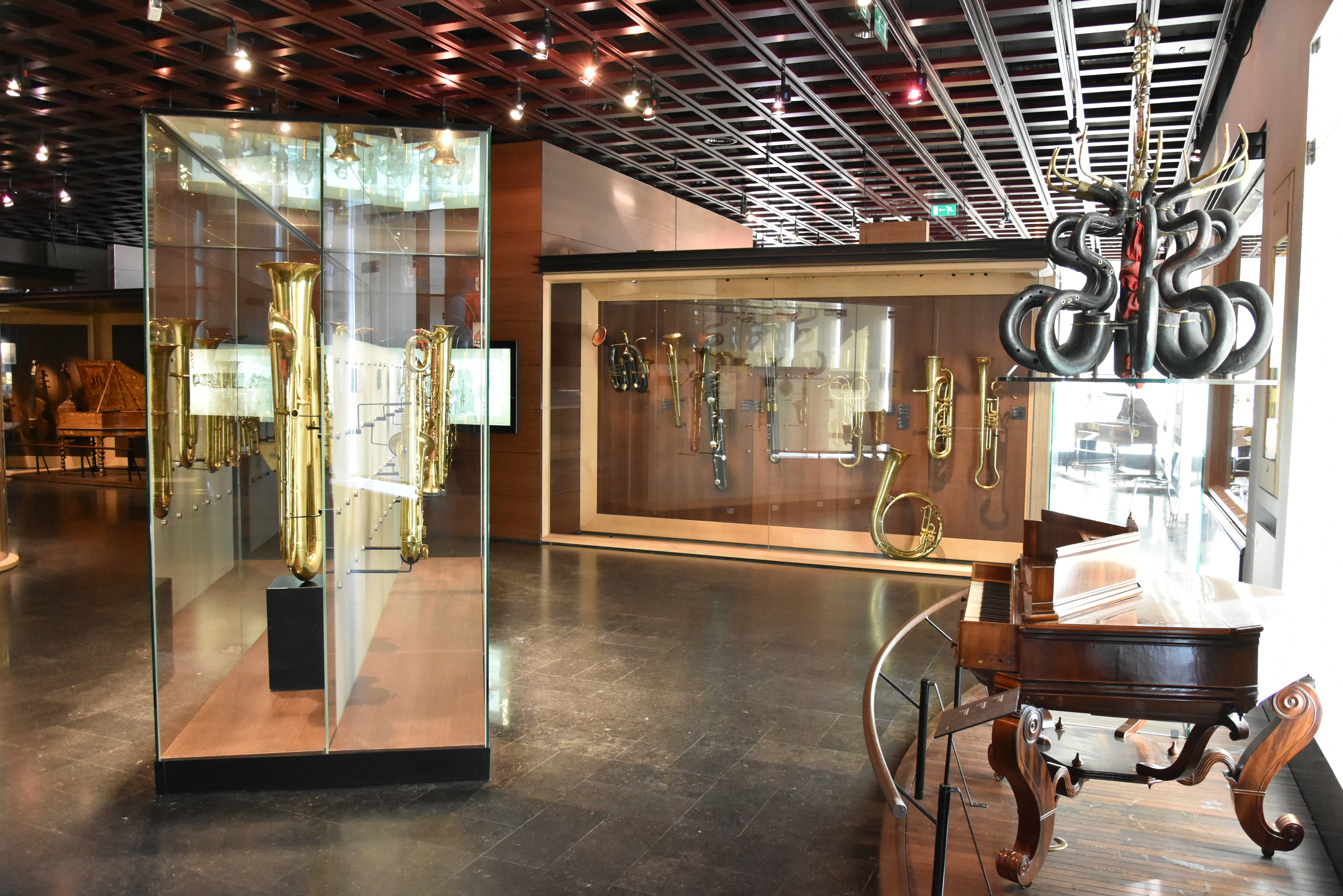
Exhibition space

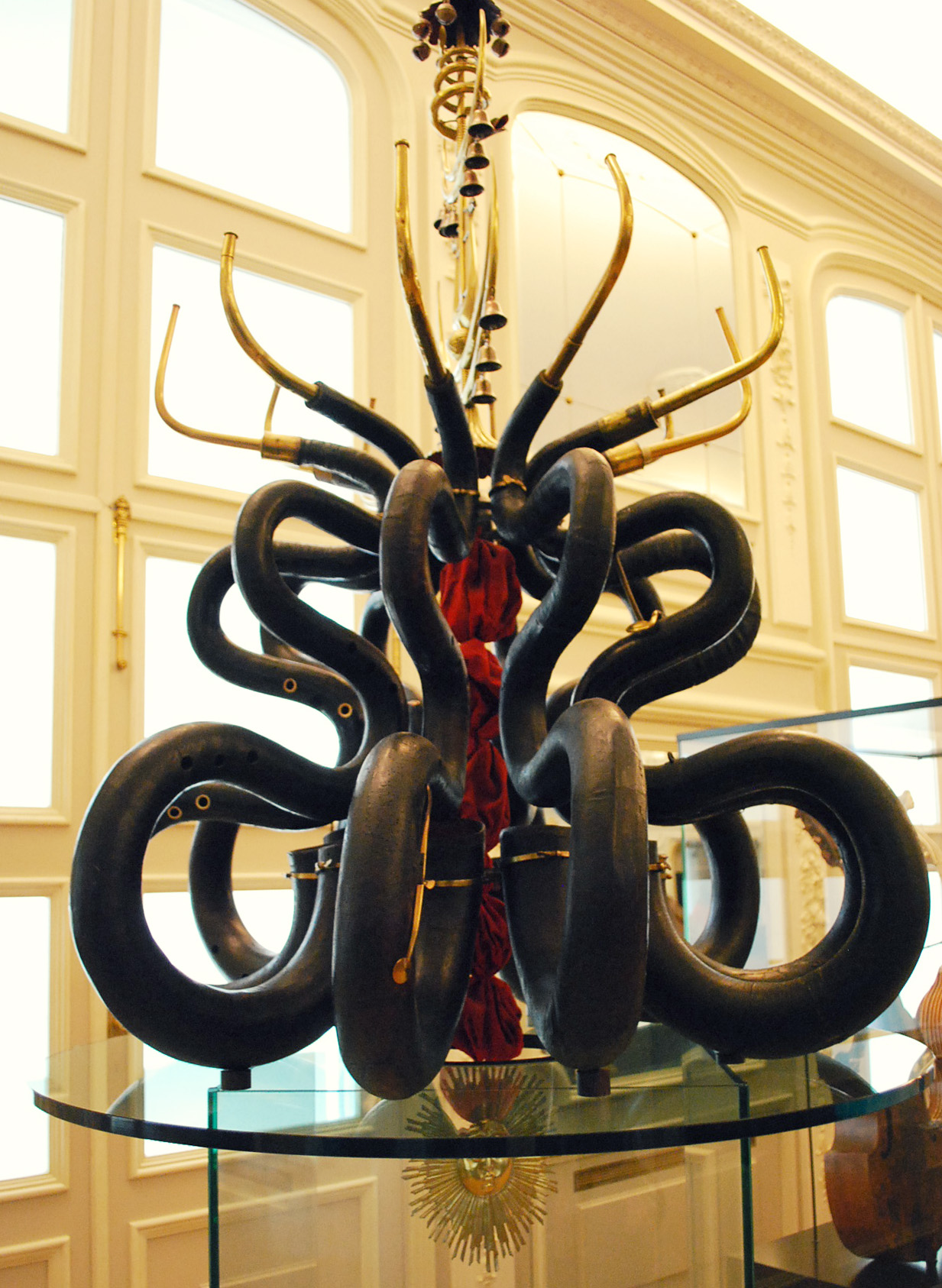
Antique instruments (serpents)

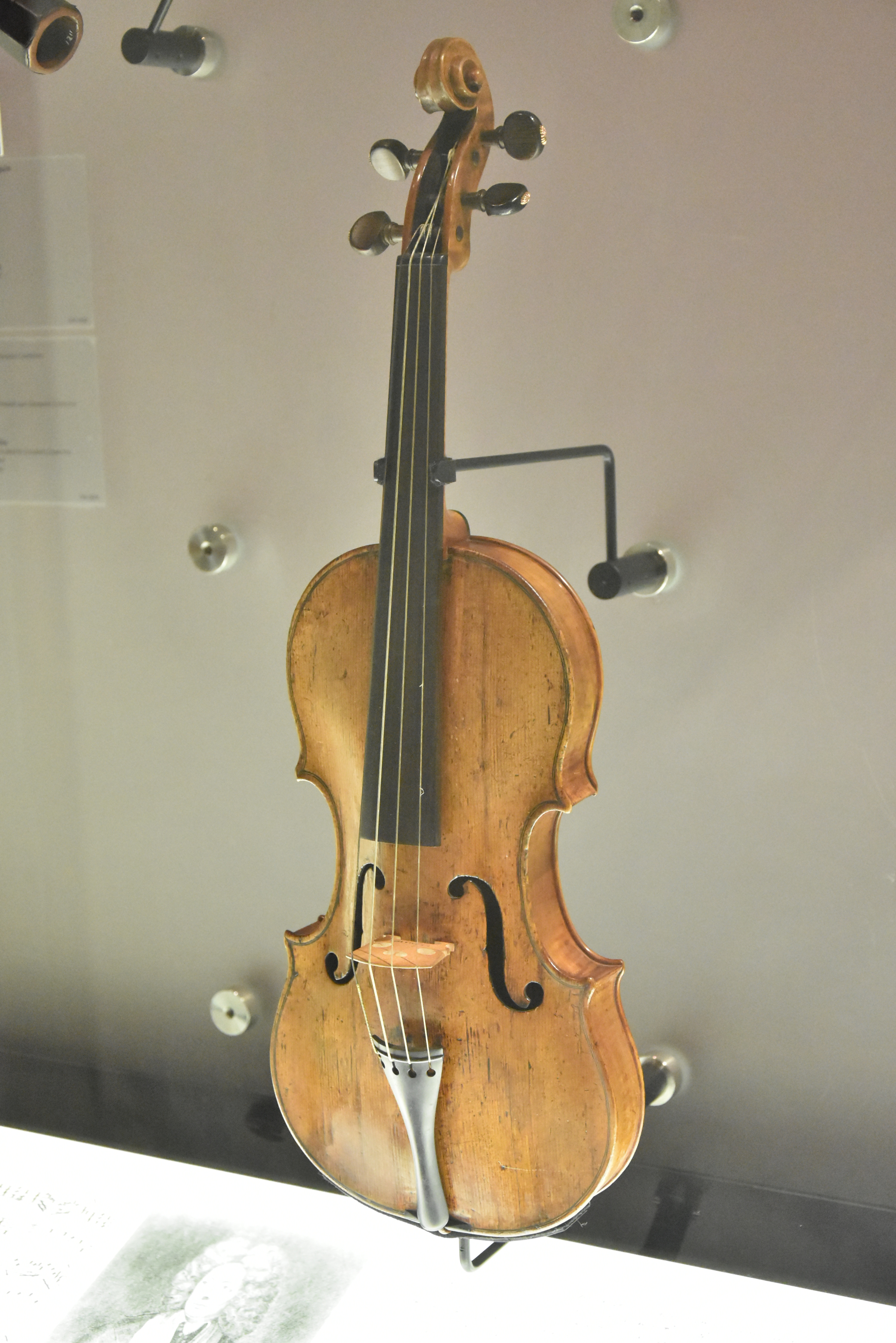
Violin by Girolamo Amati (1611, Cremona)

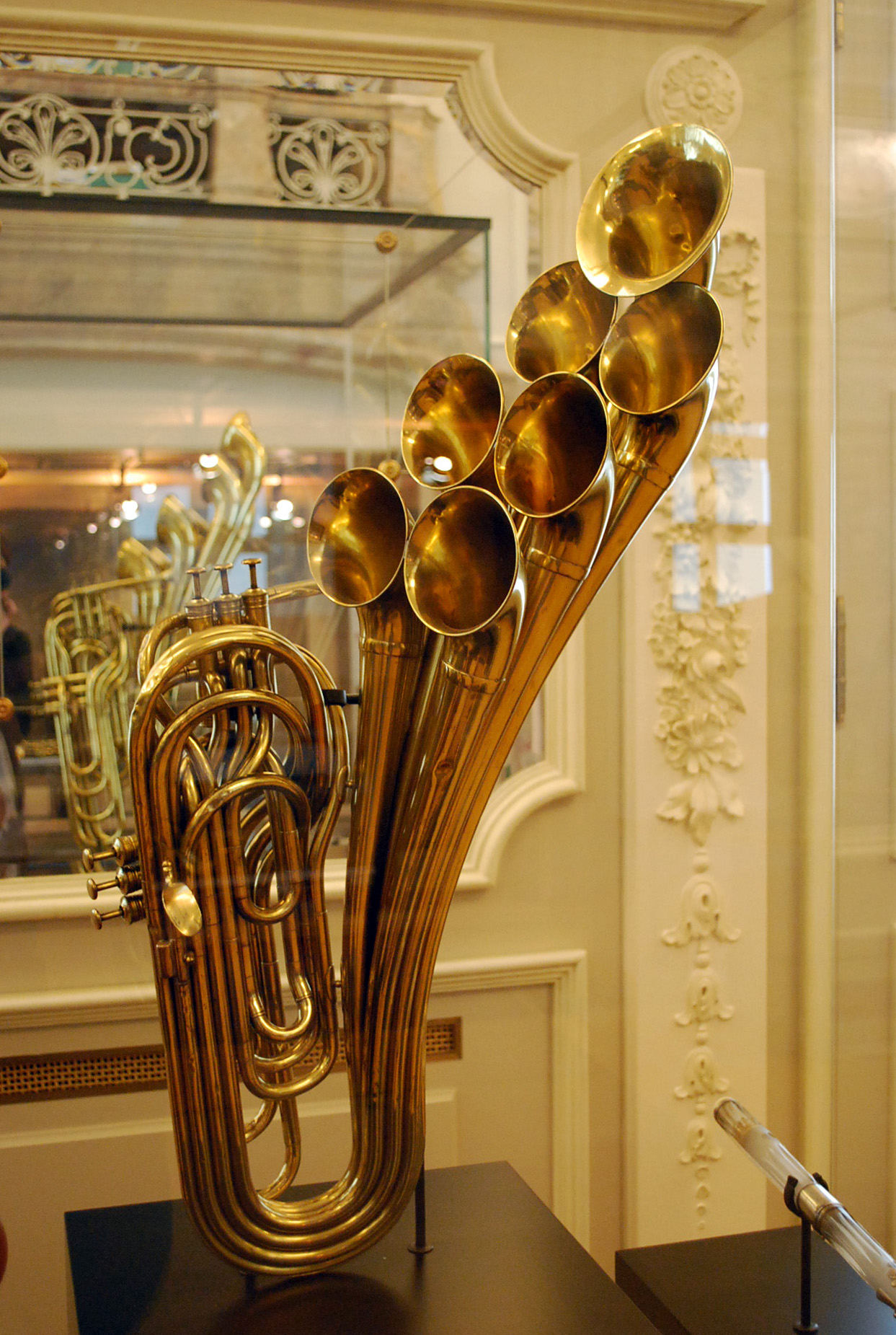
Trombone with seven bells by Adolphe Sax (1876, Paris)

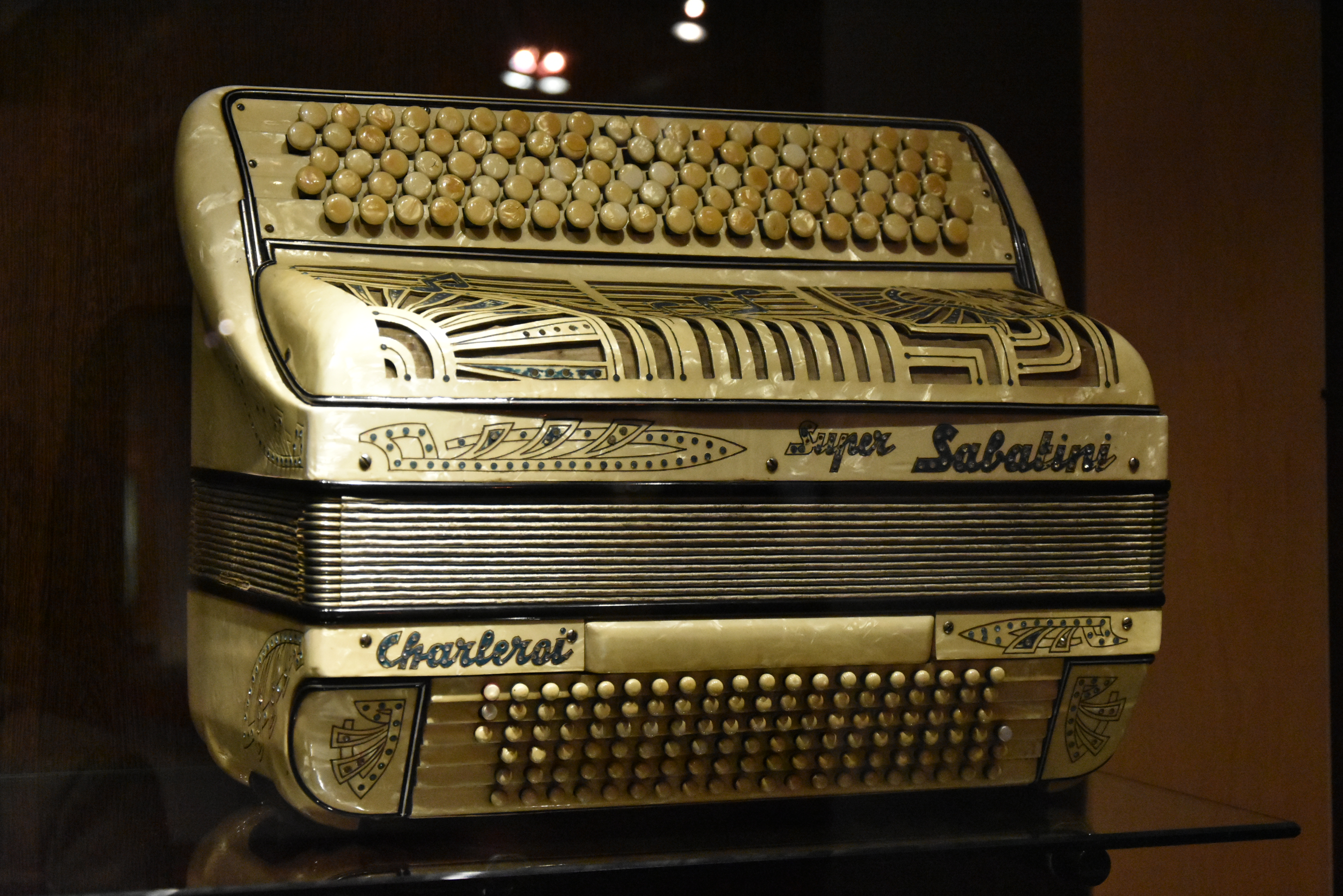
Unison accordion by Enrico Sabatini (1950)

== See also ==
- List of museums in Brussels
- List of music museums
- Art Nouveau in Brussels
- History of Brussels
- Culture of Belgium
- Belgium in the long nineteenth century
