= Hermann Alexander Moeck =

German musicologist and publisher

Hermann Alexander Moeck (16 September 1922 – 9 July 2010) was a German musicologist and publisher.

== Life ==
Born in Lüneburg, after attending Gymnasium in Celle, Moeck obtained his university entrance qualification in 1942, served in the Kriegsmarine until 1945 and studied musicology, philosophy, art history and ethnology in Göttingen and Münster until 1948. In 1951 he was awarded a doctorate at the Georg-August-Universität Göttingen with the dissertation Ursprung und Tradition der Kernspaltflöten der europäischen Folklore und die Herkunft der musikgeschichtlichen Kernspaltflötentypen (Origin and tradition of the core fission flutes of European folklore and the origin of the music-historical core fission flute types). In 1960 Moeck took over the company of his father Hermann Moeck, which was renamed Moeck Musikinstrumente + Verlag in 1965. At the end of 2002 he retired from the company management.

Moeck died in Celle at the age of 87.

== Work ==
as author

- Ursprung und Tradition der Kernspaltflöten der europäischen Folklore und die Herkunft der musikgeschichtlichen Kernspaltflötentypen. Edition Moeck, Celle 1996, ISBN 3-87549-062-2.
- Zur „Nachgeschichte“ und Renaissance der Blockflöte. Edition Moeck, Celle 1980 (Sonderdruck aus: Tibia. Magazin für Holzbläser, vol. 3 (1978)).
- Typen europäischer Kernspaltflöten. Edition Moeck, Celle 1987, ISBN 3-87549-006-1.

as publisher

- Fünf Jahrhunderte deutscher Musikinstrumentenbau. Edition Moeck, Celle 1987 (2 vols).

== Literature ==
- Nikolaus Delius (ed.): Sine musica nulla vita. Festschrift Hermann Moeck zum 75. Geburtstag. Edition Moeck, Celle 1997, ISBN 3-87549-064-9 (in German, English and Italian languages).
