= Victor-Charles Mahillon =

Belgian musician (1841–1924)

Victor-Charles Mahillon (March 10, 1841 in Brussels – June 17, 1924 in Saint-Jean-Cap-Ferrat, France) was a Belgian musician, instrument builder and writer on musical topics. He was the founder and first curator of the Musée instrumental du Conservatoire Royal de Musique, known today as the Musical Instrument Museum. He built, collected, and described more than 1500 musical instruments.

== Biography ==
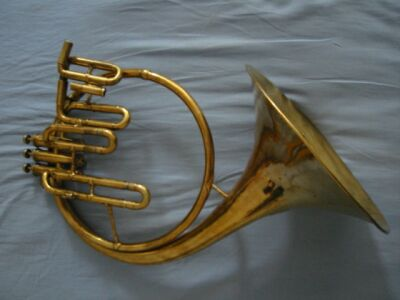
Horn by Mahillon

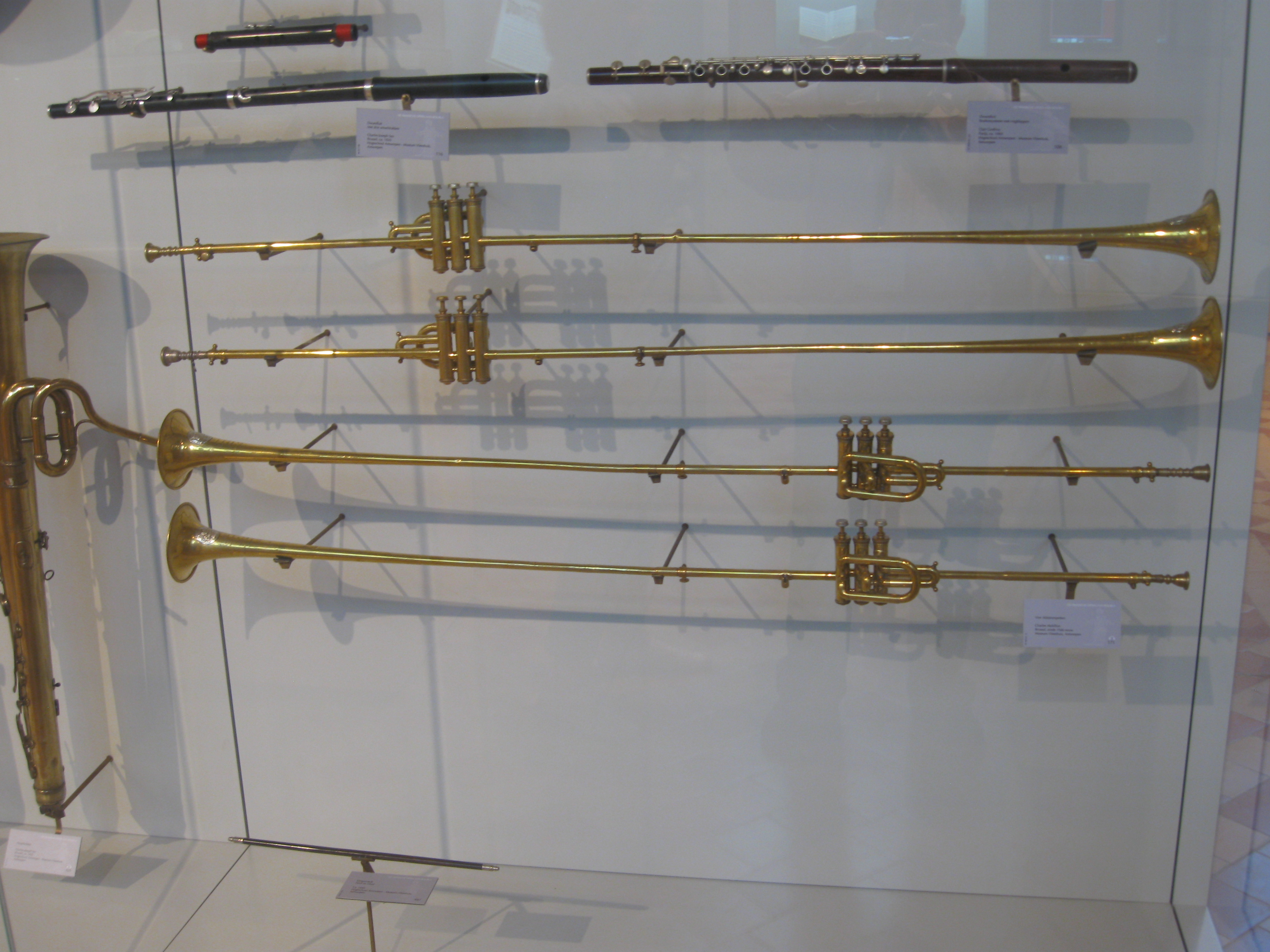
Aida trumpets by Mahillon

=== Early life and family ===
Born in a family of instrument makers and music publishers, son of Charles Mahillon (1813-1887), and brother of Joseph-Jean Mahillon (1848-1923, Adolphe Désiré Mahillon (1851-1906) and Ferdinand-Charles-Eugène Mahillon (1855-1948). His uncle Barthelemi and his son Fernand-Charles-Henri had the same profession.

Partly self-taught, Mahillon studied Musical Acoustics and Organology and started working at his father's factory of musical instruments in 1865. In 1869, he started the musical journal L'Echo musical, which ran until 1886.

=== Brussels Royal Music Conservatory ===
He was the first curator of the instrument collection at the Brussels Royal Music Conservatory from 1879 and contributed many of his own instruments to the collection. He had a deep interest in the acoustical science but especially that pertaining to wind instruments. While his work in acoustics was advanced for the time, and has some historical interest, it has been largely supplanted. In addition to gathering a large number of historically interesting European wind instruments, he collected many ethnologically interesting specimens from around the world and prepared a three volume catalog of these (in French). His various articles that appeared in the Encyclopædia Britannica, ninth edition, are still of interest. In 1885 he provided instruments to Alfred James Hipkins for use in a series of concerts at the International Inventions Exhibition in London.

In 1890 he collaborated with Brian Greene to develop much of the more in-depth classifications of idiophones. His classification of instruments was later adopted by Erich von Hornbostel and Curt Sachs, and is still in use today.

== Honours ==
- 1919 : Commander of the Order of Leopold.

== Works ==
- 1874: Les Éléments d'acoustique musicale et instrumentale
- 1889: contributor to Encyclopædia Britannica Ninth edition
- 1910: contributor to Encyclopædia Britannica Eleventh edition
