= Moeck Musikinstrumente + Verlag =

Coordinates: 52.5951°N 10.1131°E

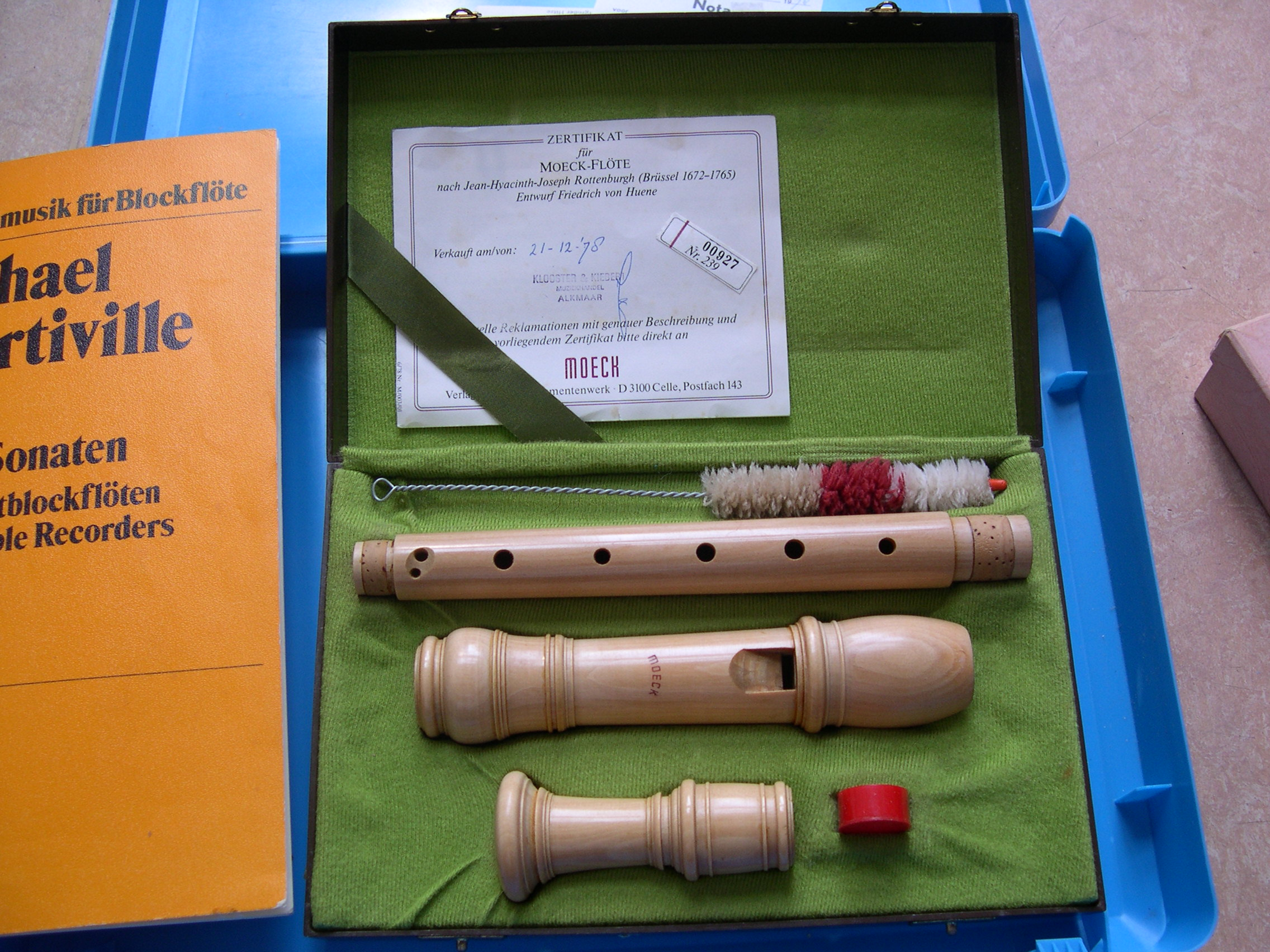
Moeck recorder flute

Moeck Musikinstrumente + Verlag is a leading German manufacturer of recorders and a music publisher.

The company was founded in 1925 by Hermann Moeck (1896-1982) in Celle. In 1960 his son Hermann Alexander Moeck (1922-2010) took over the business. The current owner is Sabine Haase-Moeck.

The company produces recorders for beginners and handmade instruments for soloists. They began as a publisher in 1929/30 as part of the youth movement in Germany, later adding recorders manufactured by Markneukirchen, and began manufacturing their own instruments in 1949. Beginning in 1966, during the revival of early music, they worked with Friedrich von Huene to develop their Rottenburgh model line. Moeck formerly manufactured historical instruments such as crumhorn, rauschpfeifes, shawms, cornetts, and dulcians designed by Otto Steinkopf, but the Renaissance and Baroque Woodwind Instruments division was closed in December 2008.

The publishing division specialized in recorder music, and publishes Tibia, a woodwind periodical.

For the past 40 years, Moeck has had a commercial relationship with The Early Music Shop, the largest music store worldwide specialising in renaissance instruments, which serves as one of its official exclusive UK distributors and agents. Moeck is now one of the most recognised recorder makes in the world.
