= The Early Music Shop =

Retailer of reproduction medieval, renaissance and baroque musical instruments

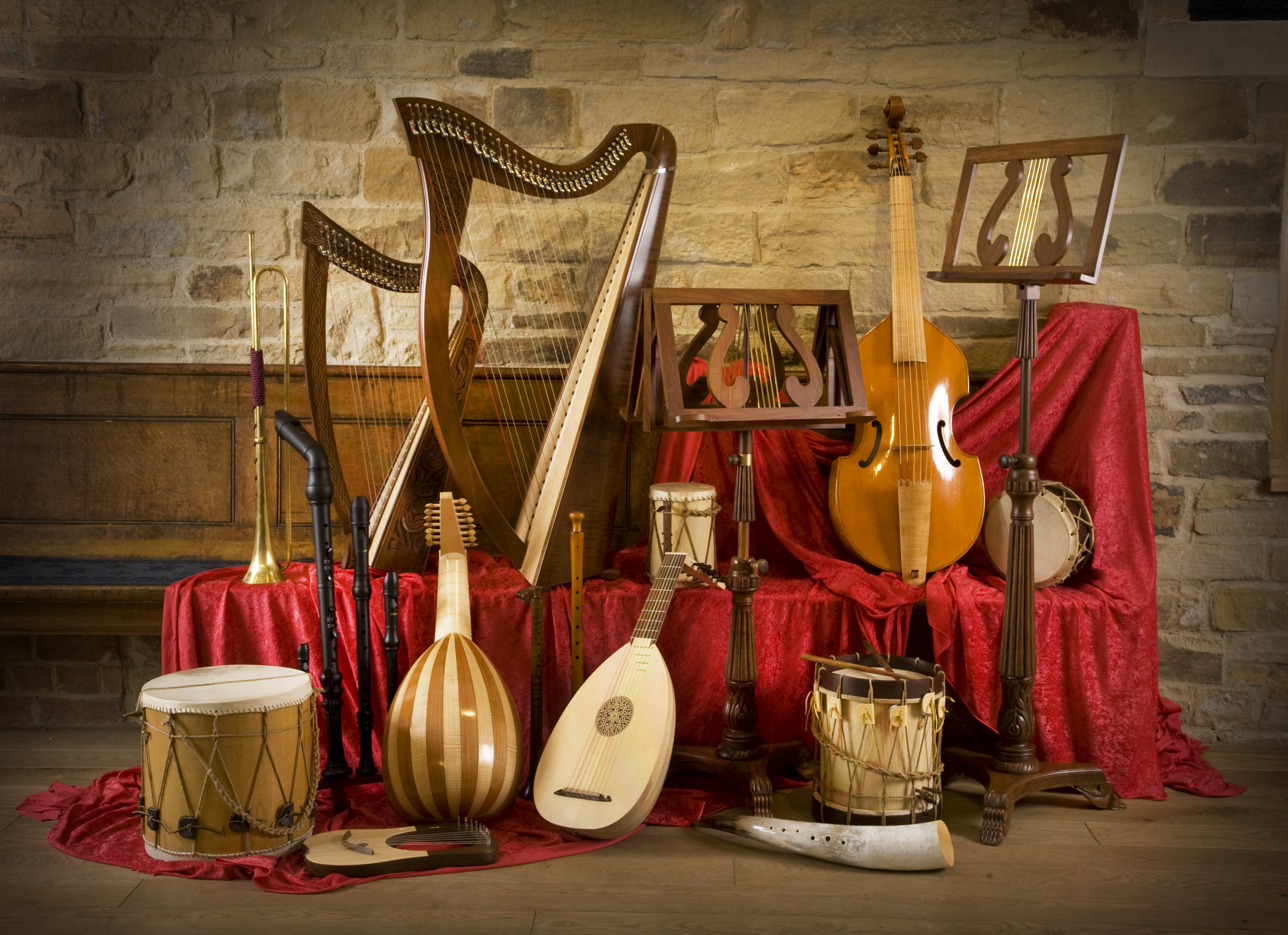
- A selection of renaissance instruments on display at The Early Music Shop.
- Type: Privately-owned company
- Industry: Music
- Founded: 1968; 58 years ago in the United Kingdom
- Founder: Richard Wood
- Headquarters: Salts Mill, Saltaire, West Yorkshire, United Kingdom
- Owners: Chris Butler (2018-present); Music Sales (2007-2018); J Wood & Sons Ltd. (1968-2007)

The Early Music Shop is an early music store specialising in the sale and distribution of reproduction Renaissance and medieval musical instruments, with two showrooms situated in Saltaire and Snape Maltings, United Kingdom. It was founded by Richard Wood in 1968 and has become the largest supplier of early musical instruments worldwide.

== History ==
=== J Wood & Sons Ltd. ===
The Early Music Shop is the trading name of J Wood & Sons Ltd., a family firm that was incorporated in 1850 by Joseph Wood, with its original business name 'J Wood Music'. In 1877, the business expanded and moved to Bradford, where it became J Wood & Sons Ltd. Almost 100 years later, during the revival of early music, J Wood & Sons Ltd. received some unusual historical instruments as part of an education order. Intrigued, Richard Wood, the founder's great-great-grandson, researched these instruments by attending a music fair in Frankfurt – the Musikmesse Frankfurt – during which he met Otto Steinkopf, a pioneer in the reconstruction of early instruments, at a Moeck stand, and speculatively bought a collection of recorders, crumhorns and string instruments. Local enthusiasts immediately took to the new stock, which quickly sold out, and subsequently J Wood & Sons Ltd. formed a separate department within their business specialising in early music. This was henceforth known as 'The Early Music Shop', and is now considered to be the "centre of the early music universe".

=== Revival of the Early Music Movement ===
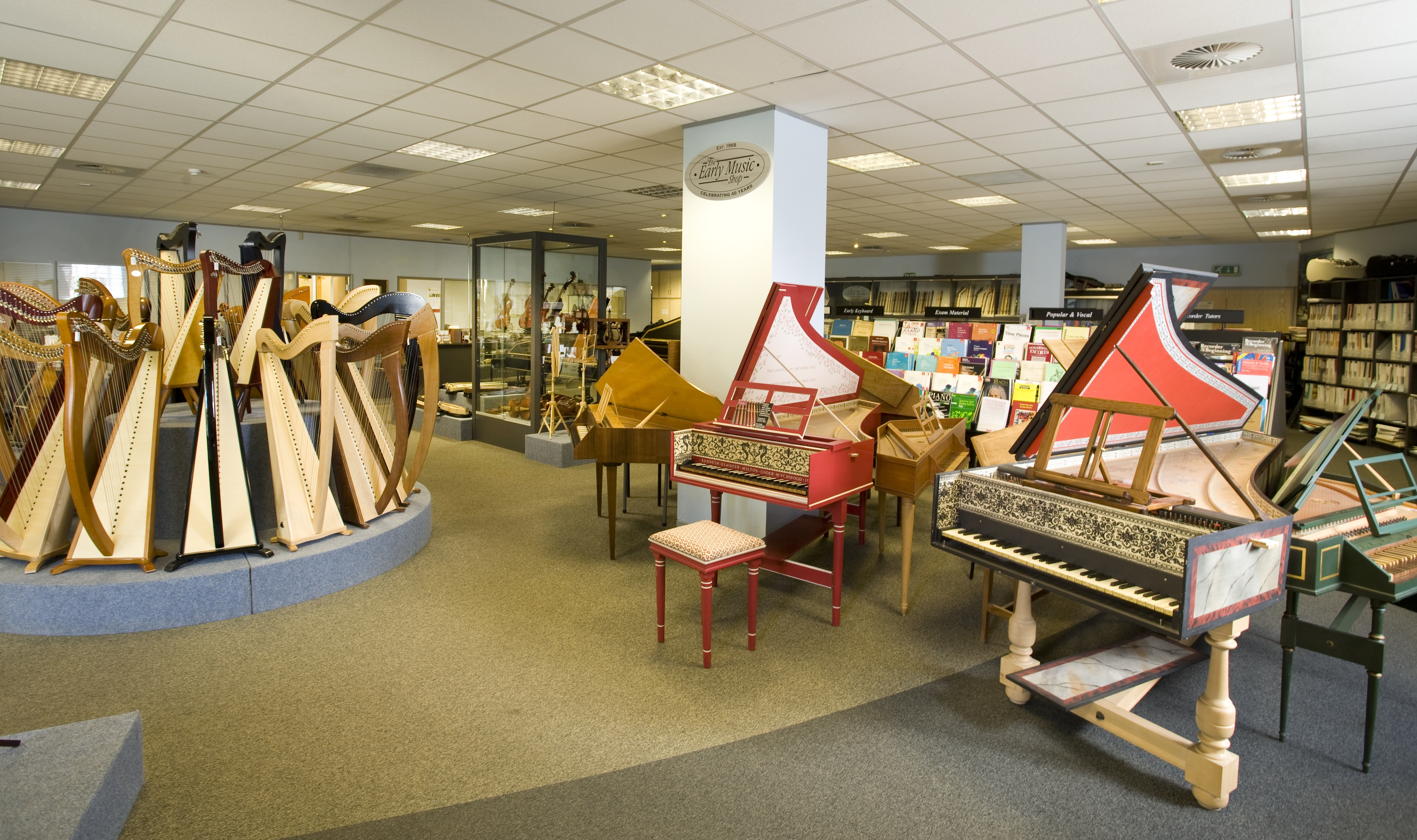
The birth of the early music revival attracted musicians to a variety of unique historical instruments.

Interest in early music and historical instruments increased following David Munrow's success, particularly in the music he produced for the TV series The Six Wives of Henry VIII in 1971. Munrow's score for this series featured authentic music performed using only historical instruments, thus generating much enthusiasm for early musical instruments and music from the renaissance period across audiences worldwide. Munrow himself was a loyal and enthusiastic customer of J Wood & Sons Ltd., having enthusiastically encouraged Richard Wood to start up a business specialising in these historical instruments, and even helped devise the name of "The Early Music Shop".

Consequentially, demand for renaissance instruments increased, and so The Early Music Shop began trading with other businesses in the same field, such as Moeck and Mollenhauer, and began holding an exhibition in London for all makers and publishers involved in early music in order to generate publicity. As a result, the business continued to grow, and moved to Manningham Lane in Bradford in 1987 as part of Wood's Music Shop, where it continued to produce historical instruments and kits in its workshops until 1999.

== The Early Music Shop today ==
=== Move to Salts Mill ===
In 2007, following its acquisition by Music Sales, the headquarters for The Early Music Shop moved premises from Wood's Music Shop in Bradford, and the main showroom is now situated in the renowned Salts Mill, in the centre of Saltaire, a village in West Yorkshire. Saltaire has World Heritage Site status; thus the new location for The Early Music Shop has benefitted from the many visitors drawn to the Victorian model village.

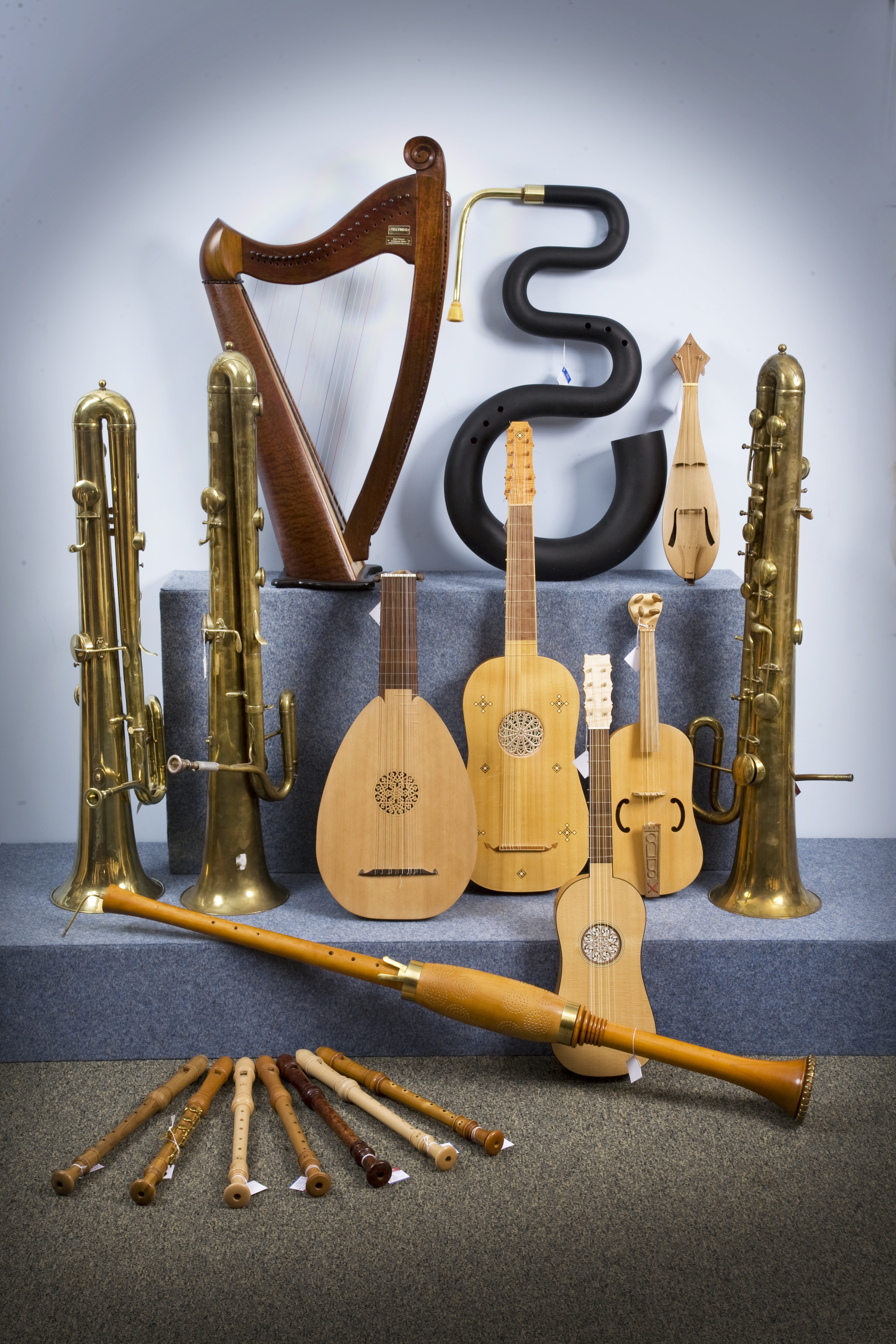
The main showroom in Saltaire features many different historical instruments.

Salts Mill has been used to host many Early Music Concerts since the business moved to Saltaire, such as a concert and workshop led by renowned early musicians Rachel Podger and Pamela Thorby, performances by Leeds Baroque Choir & Orchestra, and on regular occasions concerts led by Red Priest, a British Baroque instrumental band.

After the move, the firm began offering regular tuition in its main showroom, and hosts regular recorder, viol, harp and lute lessons for students of all standards. It also includes an agency for second-hand instruments, and a repair workshop. The new showroom for The Early Music Shop has been described as "an Aladdin's Cave of affordable early music instruments", and the business serves as the exclusive UK distributor for Moeck recorders, and a UK agent for: Küng recorders, Mollenhauer recorders, Bizzi harpsichords, Lu Mi viols, Camac harps and many others. Demand for historical instruments has kept increasing since the move to the new premises and the business in general has been referred to as 'a treasured national institution'.

A second showroom was located in Denmark Street, long-established as London's "Tin Pan Alley".

Both branches of The Early Music Shop frequently attend a variety of Early Music courses and Festivals, involving pop-up stands and workshops, across the United Kingdom. In recent years, the business has also supplied musical instruments and props for a variety of TV and film projects, including Harry Potter and the Goblet of Fire, Alexander, Kingdom of Heaven, The Other Boleyn Girl, Wolf Hall, House Of The Dragon, The Gilded Age and many others.

=== New Ownership and 50th Anniversary ===
After 10 years of ownership by Music Sales, The Early Music Shop was acquired in August 2018 by Chris Butler, a career music industry executive and long-term supporter of the business. The acquisition coincided with the launch of a new website and a commitment from the new owner to consolidate The Early Music Shop's position as the largest source of historical instruments worldwide.

=== London International Festival of Early Music ===
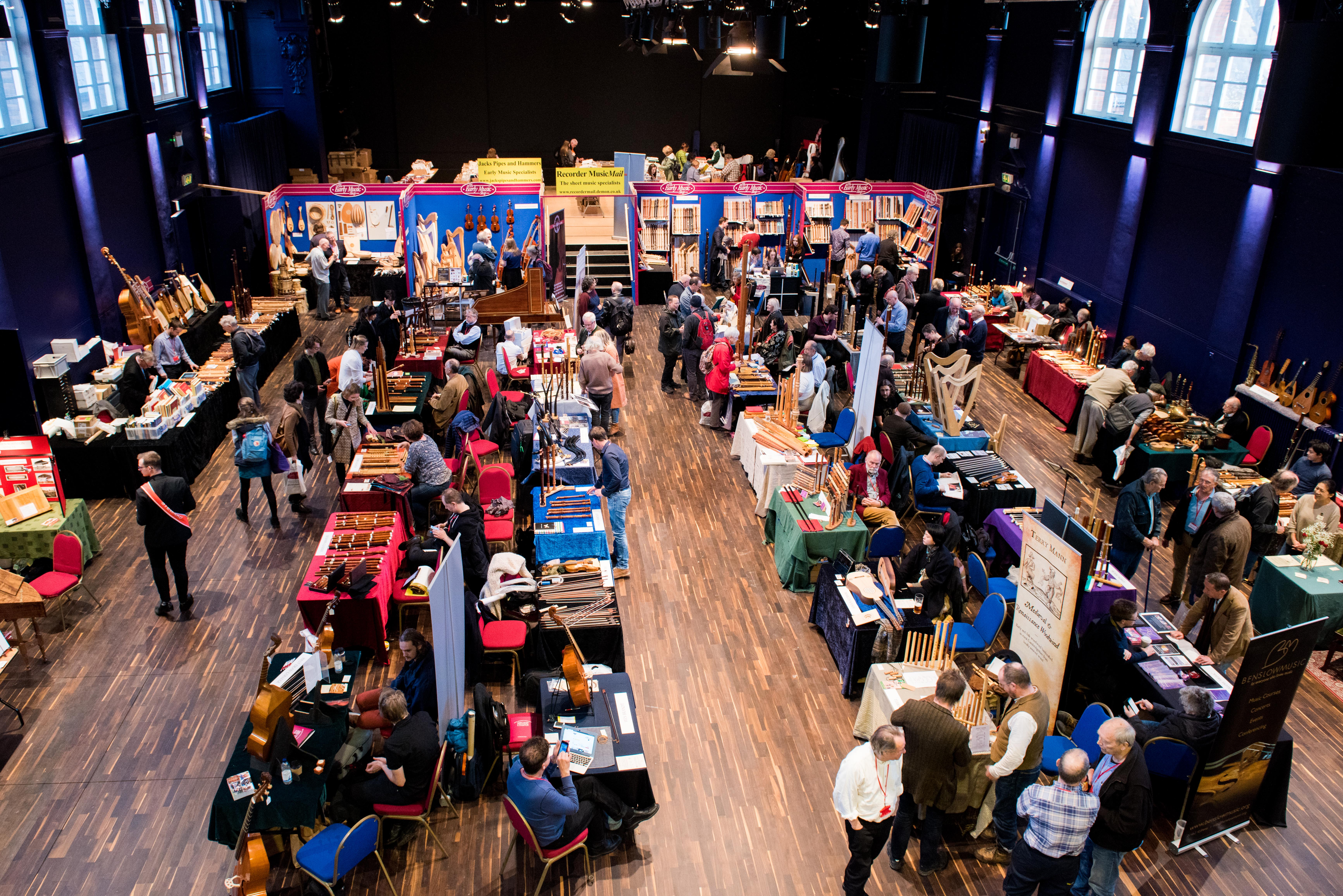
The London International Festival of Early Music taking place at Blackheath Halls in November 2018.

Since 1973, The Early Music Shop has hosted an international festival of early music in London, which includes various concerts, instrumental performance competitions and an exhibition. It is attended by approximately 100 exhibitors from the UK and overseas.

The exhibition features a vast display of early musical instruments, music publishers and societies, and is said to reflect "the constantly growing interest in performing early music".

First hosted at the Royal College of Music, the event moved to the Royal Horticultural Halls before moving back to the Royal College of Music, where it became an annual event. In 2002 the festival moved to Greenwich, but now takes place at Blackheath Halls, London's oldest surviving purpose-built cultural venue.
