= Gustave Serrurier-Bovy =

Belgian architect and furniture designer

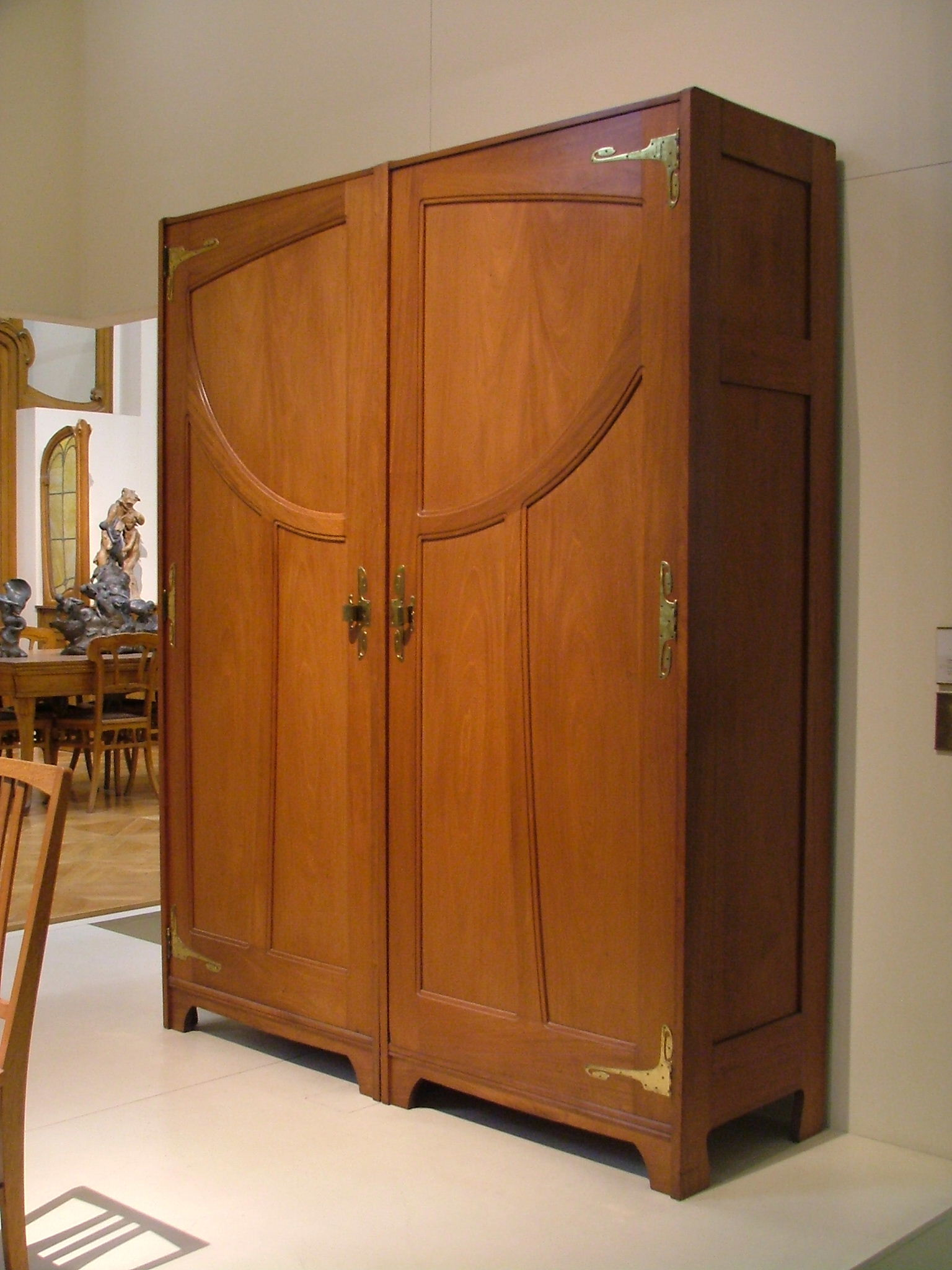
Mahogany armoire designed in 1899 by Serrurier-Bovy, on display at the Musée d'Orsay, Paris.

Gustave Serrurier-Bovy was a Belgian architect and designer (born in Liège 27 July 1858, died in Liège 19 November 1910). With Paul Hankar, Victor Horta and Henry van de Velde, he was one of the leading Belgian representatives of Art Nouveau.

== Biography and main works ==
Gustave Serrurier belonged through his father to a family traditionally engaged in construction. His grandfather was a mason, his father a building contractor. From 1871 to 1879, he was enrolled at the Académie Royale des Beaux-Arts in Liège where he studied drawing, archaeology and architecture. At the same time, from 1874 onwards, he contributed to his father's construction works. Having qualified as an architect, he built several houses in Liège. Still a student, he took a critical attitude towards the education he had received at the Académie Royale des Beaux-Arts. In contrast to this education, he subscribed to the theories of Eugène Viollet-le-Duc, considering that they laid the foundations of modern architecture. He advocated the search for forms specific to the 19th century and the use of all available materials and construction methods. After having qualified as an architect, he designed several houses in Liège.

During his studies, he became friends with Armand Rassenfosse, a future painter, draughtsman and engraver. In 1884, Gustave Serrurier married Maria Bovy who worked as a saleswoman in the artwork store of Rassenfosse's parents. The couple's only daughter was born in 1885. After her marriage, Maria Serrurier-Bovy founded her own shop, selling exotic objects imported from Asia, while Gustave Serrurier pursued his career as an architect. In 1887, he produced a project for the university hospital in Liège, which was finally not selected.

In 1888, Gustave Serrurier abandoned architecture and founded in Liège the firm Serrurier-Bovy. It offered complete interior designs as well as a wide variety of furniture and decorative objects. His aesthetic vision as an interior designer is summed up in one sentence in a booklet entitled Album d'Intérieurs: "To be beautiful, a set of furniture and decoration needs above all simplicity in the lines, harmony in the colours and consistency in the proportions".

From 1892 onwards, Gustave Serrurier designed his own furniture which was manufactured in his workshops in Liège.

His growing interest for decorative arts brought him close to the Arts and Crafts movement initiated by William Morris in England. This movement promoted to use art for the embellishment of utilitarian domestic objects. Gustave Serrurier was highly receptive to this revival of the applied arts, which concerned all aspects of interior design: furniture, wallpaper, tapestries, hangings and metalwork. In 1893, he went to the exhibition organized by the Arts and Crafts movement in London and was most impressed by the exhibits. He was to maintain close relationships with several of the artists of this movement, most notably with Arthur Mackmurdo, Charles-F. Annesley Voysey and Walter Crane. His suppliers will include the London store Liberty.

In 1894, at the invitation of Octave Maus, he presented a Cabinet de Travail at the Salon de La Libre Esthétique in Brussels. It was a complete ornamental ensemble: the furniture was displayed in a room whose walls were decorated with red poppies. This Cabinet de Travail was a great success and established Gustave Serrurier as a key contributor to the revival of home design.

In 1895, he exhibited a Chambre d'Artisan at the Salon de la Libre Esthétique. The term artisan implied that the furniture was intended for a modest home. The simplicity of the Chambre d’Artisan reflected Gustave Serrurier's wish for popularizing a sense of aesthetics. That same year, he founded a group called L'Oeuvre Artistique, which organised in Liège an international exhibition devoted mainly to applied arts. The organisation of this event conveyed his very global approach to art. Lectures on designers and contemporary subjects, as well as concerts and a play by Henrik Ibsen, broadened the scope of the exhibition. The Glasgow Four (Charles Rennie Mackintosh, Margaret MacDonald Mackintosh, James Herbert MacNair, Frances MacDonald) made their first joint presentation there. For Hector Guimard, it was an opportunity to travel to Belgium and discover the work of Victor Horta, which was to have a major influence on his future projects.

Gustave Serrurier presented in 1896 a complete set of mantelpiece ornaments at the Salon de la Libre Esthétique, a Cabinet de travail at the Salon National des Beaux-Arts in Paris, and a bookcase at the Arts and Crafts movement exhibition in London.

In 1897, he furnished and decorated the house of the notary Albert Bauwens in Brussels. For the dining room, he designed a sideboard featuring a beautiful set of entrelacing, curved line compositions that characterised many of his creations of that period. That same year, at the Tervuren Colonial Exhibition, he presented an original composition consisting of large arches, the ends of which formed bench seats. He also opened a store in Brussels.

As of 1898, Serrurier's activity extended outside Belgium, mainly in Paris where he created the smoking-room furniture for the Chatham Hotel. In 1899, he exhibited a dining room at the Salon des Beaux-Arts in Paris. He established a partnership with the Parisian architect René Dulong. His workshops in Liège were extended to include a forge for metalwork.

In 1900, Gustave Serrurier opened in Paris L'art dans l'habitation, both an exhibition and a sales house, with René Dulong as concessionaire. The furniture and decorative objects on display continued to be made in Liège. At the 1900 Paris Universal Exhibition, Gustave Serrurier collaborated with René Dulong to build and decorate a restaurant at the foot of the Eiffel Tower, Le Pavillon Bleu. The building's architecture was characterised by tautened curves reminiscent of Gustave Serrurier's furniture style. At this period, the violinist Eugène Ysaÿe ordered a desk and Gustave Serrurier created a model with a music rack. This design was later to be used in the furnishing of the composer Alexandre Scriabin's studio in Moscow.

In 1901, Gustave Serrurier renovated the Château de la Chapelle-en-Serval, located in a wooded park north of Paris. The house contained a large number of reception rooms and bedrooms. The setting he created was inspired by country life, with a particularly refined harmony of colours. That same year, Gustave Serrurier presented a bedroom at the Salon National des Beaux-Arts in Paris. He also saw the exhibition "Ein Dokument Deutscher Kunst" in Darmstadt. Although very interested in this event, he was rather critical of the architecture and design of the German Jugendstil and, in contrast, advocated the simple lines and shapes that would increasingly characterise his creations.

Advocating art for all, Gustave Serrurier designed in 1902 a furniture model called Campagne, which was mass-produced mechanically. This furniture was simple, aesthetic, functional and moderately priced. 1902 was also the year in which the plans for L'Aube were first conceived. This villa became the residence of his family from 1904 onwards and also served as a meeting place for representatives of the decorative arts. The living space was designed to harmonize with nature. The reception rooms include a sitting room, a dining room and a music room but also a small indoor garden and an aviary for birds. The living room furniture consisted of prototypes of the Liszt model which was to be manufactured later (1903-1904). At this time, Gustave Serrurier designed the Perle simple furniture, remarkable for its sober lines. He also designed the furniture for the music room of the Château de la Chapelle-en-Serval, decorated by Emile Berchmans and opened a shop in The Hague.

In January 1903, Gustave Serrurier became president of L'Avant-Garde, a literary and artistic circle. In line with his convictions, the circle defended socially progressive ideas. It also addressed the relationship between art and society. In March 1903, the firm Serrurier & Cie was founded, involving Gustave Serrurier and two partners. One of them was René Dulong who shared the artistic responsibility. The activity concentrated on the mass production of furniture and decorative objects, and especially light fittings. The company employed 60 cabinetmakers and existed until 1907. In 1903, Gustave Serrurier and René Dulong undertook the transformation and decoration of the Château de La Cheyrelle, an estate located in the Cantal region. The work took until 1905 to be completed. The first step was to create a large living room, remarkable for its three bays and its "snowdrop" frieze. The Silex furniture was designed for the bedrooms of La Cheyrelle. It will be mass-produced from 1905 onwards. New models of dining room furniture named after flowers date from 1903: Marguerite, Réséda, Tulipe. The small sitting room pieces of Bach furniture were also created at that time.

In 1904, Gustave Serrurier and René Dulong opened a new store in Paris offering not only furniture and decorative objects but also wallpapers, textiles and embroidery. Serrurier was present at the Universal Exhibition of Saint-Louis (Missouri, USA), where he won a gold and a silver medal. From 1904 until 1906, he participated in the Salon de l'Automobile in Paris. In 1904, he took part in a competition to furnish guest rooms for the Automobile Club de France. At the end of the year, he filed three patents for office furniture: an American office Sigma, a revolving bookcase Gamma as well as modular bookcases.

In 1905, a concession was opened in Nice and the store in The Hague was closed. This period saw the mass-production of Silex furniture. These were very simple pieces of poplar furniture decorated with stencils. In a very different style, a mahogany living room furniture of essentially rectilinear shape was created, bearing the name of Saint-Saëns. The decoration featured small plates of Loetz glass, a material that was to be used on several pieces of furniture and objects created at that time. Gustave Serrurier took part in the 1905 Universal Exhibition in Liège in several sectors (furniture, textiles, lighting, embroidery, ironwork, etc.). He was awarded two gold medals, two silver medals and two bronze medals. Serrurier & Cie also sold a set of gold-plated silver jewellery with semi-precious stones. They were characterised by their simplicity and geometric shapes.

In 1906, Serrurier & Cie offered a wide range of furniture and decorative items in four locations: Liège, Brussels, Paris and Nice. Gustave Serrurier created a dining room design in elm with inlays, called Magnolia.

In July 1907, the Serrurier & Cie company was dissolved, and the Paris store was closed. The sales activity continued under the name of Serrurier-Bovy.

In 1910, Gustave Serrurier designed and built his own pavilion at the Brussels Exhibition. A prominent exhibit was a bookcase bench in mahogany decorated with stylised flowers in inlaid marquetry and named after Wagner. In the autumn of 1910, Gustave Serrurier drew up plans for the decoration of a villa in Mar del Plata, Argentina, the Villa Ortiz Basualdo. Gustave Serrurier never completed the decoration and the furnishings for the villa. He died suddenly on 19 November 1910.

The Serrurier-Bovy manufacturing and sales activity, run by Gustave Serrurier's wife and daughter, continued for a few years. The company closed in 1921.

== Bibliography ==
Jacques-Grégoire Watelet, Serrurier-Bovy, De l’Art nouveau à l’Art déco, Edition du Perron, Liège, 1986.

Graciela Di Lorio et Jacques-Grégoire Watelet, Villa Ortiz Basualdo, Mar del Plata, Serrurier-Bovy, Éditions du Perron, Liège, 1994.

Françoise Bigot du Mesnil du Buisson et Etienne du Mesnil du Buisson, Gustave Serrurier-Bovy. Origines et destins de la firme Serrurier-Bovy, Bulletin de l’Institut Archéologique Liégeois, CX (1999), p. 271-383.

Jacques-Grégoire Watelet, L’œuvre d’une vie, Gustave Serrurier-Bovy, Architecte et décorateur Liégeois, 1858-1910, Edition du Perron, Liège, 2000.

Françoise Bigot du Mesnil du Buisson et Etienne du Mesnil du Buisson, Serrurier-Bovy, un créateur précurseur 1858-1910, Editions Faton, 2008. (English version : Serrurier-Bovy, a visionary designer 1858-1910)

Muriel De Groef et Isabel Wets, Art Nouveau, Villa Ortiz Basualdo, Mar del Plata, Serrurier-Bovy, Husson Editeur, 2008.

Marie-Amélie Tharaud, Un joyau éphémère de l’Art nouveau : le Pavillon Bleu à l’Exposition Universelle de 1900, Livraisons de l’histoire et de l’architecture, 19|2010.
